= Our Fighting Forces =

DC Comics war comics anthology

- Cover to Our Fighting Forces #29 (Jan. 1958), art by Joe Kubert.

Publication information
- Publisher: DC Comics
- Schedule: Bimonthly: #1–11, #53–64, #104–153, #167–181; Monthly: #12–52, #154–166; Eight times a year: #65–103
- Format: Ongoing series
- Publication date: October–November 1954 – September–October 1978
- No. of issues: 181
- Main character(s): Gunner, Sarge and Pooch; Larry Rock the Fighting Devil Dog; Capt. Hunter; Lt. Hunter's Hellcats; The Losers

Creative team
- Written by: List: Sam Glanzman, Archie Goodwin, France Herron, Robert Kanigher, Jack Kirby
- Artist: List: Jack Abel, Ross Andru, Ken Barr, Gene Colan, Ed Davis, Mort Drucker, Mike Esposito, Ric Estrada, George Evans, Sam Glanzman, Jerry Grandenetti, Russ Heath, Bruce Jones, Jack Kirby, Joe Kubert, Irv Novick, John Severin, Tom Sutton, Frank Thorne, Alex Toth, Wally Wood
- Editor: List: Robert Kanigher (#1–113) Joe Kubert (#114–143) Archie Goodwin (#144–150) Jack Kirby (#151–162) Murray Boltinoff (#163–181)

Collected editions
- Jack Kirby's The Losers: ISBN 1-4012-2165-3

Our Fighting Forces is a war comics anthology series published by DC Comics for 181 issues from 1954 to 1978.

== Publication history ==
Our Fighting Forces began with an October-November 1954 cover date. Writer-editor Robert Kanigher's work appeared in most issues of the title. Artist Alex Toth worked with writer/editor Archie Goodwin on the story "Burma Sky" in Our Fighting Forces #146 (Dec. 1973–Jan. 1974) and Goodwin praised Toth's art in a 1998 interview: "To me, having Alex Toth do any kind of airplane story, it's a joy for me. If I see a chance to do something like that, I will. He did a really fabulous job on it". "Burma Sky" was reprinted in black-and-white decades later in Genius Illustrated: The Life and Work of Alex Toth. Jack Kirby wrote and drew issues #151 to 162 featuring The Losers. Other contributors include artists Jack Abel, Ross Andru, Ken Barr, Gene Colan, Ed Davis, Mort Drucker, Mike Esposito, Ric Estrada, George Evans, Jerry Grandenetti, Russ Heath, Bruce Jones, Joe Kubert, Irv Novick, John Severin, Tom Sutton, Frank Thorne, and Wally Wood, some of whom would also script. The series was cancelled as part of the DC Implosion with issue #181 (September–October 1978).

An Our Fighting Forces one-shot was published in November 2010.

== Recurring features ==
Features published in Our Fighting Forces include:

- Gunner and Sarge (from issue #45 [May 1959] to issue #94 [August 1965]) — two "Mud-Marines" and their white German Shepherd dog Pooch on a small island in the Pacific.
- The Fighting Devil-Dog Lt. Larry Rock (the brother of Our Army at War's Sgt. Rock) (from issue #95 [October 1965] until #98 [February 1966]) — Marine wounded at the Battle of Corregidor by shrapnel in his head that literally makes him see red on a Pacific island.
- Capt. Phil Hunter (from issue #99 [April 1966] until #105 [January–February 1967]) — Green Beret in the Vietnam War searching for his twin brother Nick, a pilot shot down by the Viet Cong.
- Lt. Hunter's Hellcats (from #106 [March–April 1967] until #123 [January–February 1970])— Capt. Hunter's father Ben in World War II who formed a unit of military prisoners (a comics copy of The Dirty Dozen).
- The Losers (issues #123 [January–February 1970] to #181 [September–October 1978]) — DC Comics war heroes who had lost their own features:
  - Capt. Storm of the Navy who appeared in his own series Capt. Storm which lasted 18 issues.
  - Johnny Cloud of the Army Air Forces who appeared in All-American Men of War.
  - Gunner & Sarge of the Marines who appeared in their own feature in Our Fighting Forces.

== Collected editions ==
- America at War includes Our Fighting Forces #49: "Blind Gunner!" by Robert Kanigher and Jerry Grandenetti and Our Fighting Forces #102: "Cold Steel for a Hot War!" by Kanigher and Jack Abel, 247 pages, July 1979, ISBN 978-0671249533
- Showcase Presents: The Losers collects G.I. Combat #138 and Our Fighting Forces #123–150, 456 pages, April 2012, ISBN 1-4012-3437-2
- U.S.S. Stevens: The Collected Stories includes "U.S.S. Stevens" stories from Our Fighting Forces #125–128, 132, 134, 136, 138–141, 143, and 148, 424 pages, July 2016, ISBN 978-0486801582
- The Losers by Jack Kirby collects Our Fighting Forces #151–162, 240 pages, March 2009, ISBN 1-4012-2165-3

== See also ==
- Jack Kirby bibliography
