= The War that Time Forgot =

Comic book

- Showcase Presents The War that Time Forgot by Ross Andru and Mike Esposito with Joe Kubert.

Publication information
- Publisher: DC Comics
- Publication date: April/May 1960

Creative team
- Created by: Robert Kanigher; Ross Andru

The War that Time Forgot is a comic book feature published by DC Comics beginning in 1960 in the title Star Spangled War Stories, created by Robert Kanigher, Ross Andru and Mike Esposito. It ran for eight years, ended in 1968, and returned as a limited series in 2008.

Featuring a combination of science fantasy and World War II comic motifs, the stories featured a group of American soldiers, stranded on an uncharted island during the Pacific War which they discover is populated by dinosaurs. This location was later named Dinosaur Island.

== Publication history ==
The War that Time Forgot was created by writer/editor Robert Kanigher and artists Ross Andru and Mike Esposito in Star Spangled War Stories #90 (May 1960). They continued to compose most of the stories during the comic's run. During its time, it was the main feature of the title.

The title and some of the premises might have been influenced by Edgar Rice Burroughs's The Land That Time Forgot, in which soldiers and sailors of World War I are stranded on a dinosaur-filled island near Antarctica.

The protagonists of the early adventures were not usually recurring, but a few of them appeared more than once. Among them are two soldiers named Larry and Charlie (Star Spangled War Stories #90, 92), the airborne brothers Henry, Steve and Tommy Frank a.k.a. "The Flying Boots" (Star Spangled War Stories #99–100, 104–105), early prototypes of the G.I. Robot (Star Spangled War Stories #101–103, 125) members of the original Suicide Squad (Star Spangled War Stories #110–111, 116–121, 125, 127–128), sailors PT and Prof (Star Spangled War Stories #110–111) and the flying ace called "The Brother with No Wings" (Star Spangled War Stories #129, 131).

The series ran in Star Spangled War Stories from issues #90–137 (although issues #91, 93 and 126 did not feature The War That Time Forgot stories). The final story was in the Feb.–March 1968 issue of Star Spangled War Stories; afterwards, the Enemy Ace, a German World War I pilot, became the focus of the book and the dinosaur storyline was retired. In 1973, some of these stories were reprinted in Four Star Battle Tales #3 and G.I. War Tales #1 and 2. The War That Time Forgot re-appeared in the October 1976 issue (#195) of G.I. Combat, featuring the Haunted Tank.

In the 1980s, DC briefly revisited The War that Time Forgot in a run as one of the features in Weird War Tales (#100). During the series run in Weird War Tales, Dinosaur Island was visited by the Creature Commandos and the G.I. Robot. This was the World War II version of the Commandos.

Dinosaur Island was also featured in Tim Truman's 1998 four-issue miniseries, Guns of the Dragon. The 1920s set miniseries provided a sort of origin story for the island.

In Darwyn Cooke's 2003 alternate-universe mini-series DC: The New Frontier, Dinosaur Island was revisited yet again as part of its opening prelude. Here, it is visited by the military team known as The Losers.

In May 2008, Bruce Jones launched The War that Time Forgot as a 12-issue limited series, featuring Enemy Ace, Firehair, and Tomahawk on one side and the Golden Gladiator, Viking Prince, and G.I. Robot on the other.

== Collections ==
A DC Showcase Presents black and white trade paperback collection, The War that Time Forgot, was published in 2007. It reprints the complete original run of stories published between 1960 and 1968.

The 2008 series was collected in two volumes:

- The War That Time Forgot Vol. 1 (collects The War That Time Forgot #1-6)
- The War That Time Forgot Vol. 2 (collects The War That Time Forgot #7-12)

== In other media ==
=== Television ===
- Dinosaur Island appears in Batman: The Brave and the Bold. This version is located in the Caribbean.
- A variation of Dinosaur Island appears in the Justice League Action episode "Booster's Gold". This version is an island located in the Bermuda Triangle that Booster Gold built a theme park on. Green Arrow inspires him to erase the park from existence via time travel.
- Dinosaur Island appears in DC Showcase: The Losers In the animated short, set during WW2, The Losers, a team of misfits consisting of US Navy PT Boat Captain Bill Storm, US Army Air Force Captain Johnny Cloud, US Marines Gunner, Sarge, Henry "Mile a Minute" Jones with their war dog Pooch. They were on a mission with Nationalist Chinese Army Intelligence Special Agent Fan Long

=== Film ===
The Centre, a character inspired by Dinosaur Island, appears in Justice League: The New Frontier, voiced by Keith David. It is a monstrous creature born from the Earth that has the appearance of a floating island, possesses psychic abilities, and can transform its body to extrude tentacles and spawn dinosaur minions. Having observed the evolution of Earth, it came to view humanity as a threat and settled in the Pacific, gaining a reputation as an omnipresent spirit with no beginning or end. Eventually, the Justice League work together to trap the Centre and hurl it into space, where its body implodes.
