= The Losers (comics) =

Comic book by Robert Kanigher

- The first issue of The Losers serial in Our Fighting Forces #123 (January–February 1970). Art by Joe Kubert.

Publication information
- Publisher: DC Comics
- First appearance: G.I. Combat #138 (October/November 1969)
- Created by: Robert Kanigher

In-story information
- Leader(s): Captain William Storm
- Member(s): Johnny Cloud; Sarge Clay; Gunner Mackey

The Losers

Collected editions
- Showcase Presents: The Losers: ISBN 1-4012-3437-2
- Jack Kirby's The Losers: ISBN 1-8485-6194-6

The Losers is the name of a war comic book feature published by DC Comics. The name was later given to a reimagined comic book series for DC's Vertigo imprint.

The first Losers comic was a war comics feature set during World War II. It was created by Robert Kanigher and became a regular feature in DC's long-running war comic book series Our Fighting Forces beginning with issue #123, dated January/February 1970.

== The Losers ==
Prior to the formation of the group, each character had his own adventures in DC's war anthology comics. Captain Johnny Cloud, a Navajo pilot who always destroyed his planes after a mission, had appeared in All-American Men of War #82–115 (1960–1966); the two-man team of Gunner and Sarge had first appeared in issue #67 of the same title (March 1959) before transferring to Our Fighting Forces for a fifty-issue run, #45–94 (May 1959–August 1965). Captain Storm, a PT boat commander, had his own title, which lasted 18 issues from 1964 to 1967.

Their first appearance as a group was with the Haunted Tank crew in G.I. Combat #138 (October–November 1969) in a story titled "The Losers". The tank crew had failed to destroy a Nazi radar station and collected the 'Losers'. The men were on their own after surviving separate disastrous battles. The eight-man strong group rallied and returned to the site of the Nazi radar station, demolishing it. Prior to that, Captain Storm, Gunner and Sarge (along with Fighting Devil Dog) had teamed together once before to fight some Japanese naval officers in Captain Storm #13. They got their own series a few months later (January/February 1970), as the main feature of Our Fighting Forces, beginning with issue #123. Their stories as a team were written by Robert Kanigher and illustrated by a variety of artists, most notably Sam Glanzman, Russ Heath, John Severin, and Joe Kubert.

The group served in Europe, Africa, and the Pacific, meeting other DC World War II characters such as the Haunted Tank and Sergeant Rock. The team briefly had a female member named Ona Tomsen who was part of the Norwegian resistance movement, who joined the team in issue #135. At the same time, the team briefly lost Captain Storm, who suffered amnesia (and lost an eye) due to a bomb blast. They reunited in issue #141, when Capt. Storm reappeared as a one-eyed, peg-legged pirate. Gunner's pet dog Pooch also joined the team for some missions.

=== Series authors ===
Robert Kanigher was the original writer for the series, and he emphasized the group's bad luck. They were anti-heroes, and the stories emphasized negative aspects of war. During the Vietnam War, Kanigher added this philosophy to many of the DC war books. Also in common with most DC war books of the time were spectacular cover illustrations by Joe Kubert. Ken Barr did the art chores for the first issue, with Ross Andru and Mike Esposito participating beginning with issue #124. John Severin, a veteran of Marvel Comics' Sgt. Fury and his Howling Commandos, began doing the art chores by issue #132. This series lasted until Jack Kirby became artist/writer with issue #151 during the autumn of 1974. While Kirby enjoyed working with the series, he changed the story's philosophy in a manner that was often disfavored by fans, judging by comments in the book's letter pages. There have been favorable comments about his series in recent years and DC released it in collected form.

With issue #163 Bob Kanigher was back writing the book with Jack Lehti doing the art. For issue #164, Ric Estrada penciled and George Evans inked, and Evans did all of the artistic duties by issue #166. He continued with the series until the final issue, #181 (September/October 1978). A story that was originally set to feature in issue #182, written by Kanigher and drawn by Evans and entitled "Young Losers - Young Lions", was finally printed four years later in The Unknown Soldier #265 (July 1982).

=== The end ===
According to Crisis on Infinite Earths, the team ended in Markovia during the spring of 1944. Along with powered beings, such as Geo-Force and Doctor Polaris, they were defending the towers created by the Monitor. The Anti-Monitor's shadow demon minions touched each one, destroying them.

The re-ordering of the DC Universe resulted in a different ending for the team. In The Losers Special #1, written by Kanigher and illustrated by Glanzman, the Losers (along with Pooch) died in action during 1945 while destroying a German missile site: Sarge was bayoneted, Captain Storm fell on a grenade, and the remainder were strafed by aircraft bullets. The Special was published during 1985, during the Crisis' initial printing, and remained the definitive ending of the group for several years.

In 2000, a short-lived revival of the Creature Commandos resurrected Gunner as a cyborg warrior member of the new team. Gunner and Sarge are found alive and out of their own time in an issue of Birds of Prey, trapped in a POW camp in the time-fluctuating Dinosaur Island, now with a "Pooch" that is a trained Velociraptor. It is not known if they somehow went back in time to conclude their lives or if this brings them into the present.

In the backup story "Snapshot: Remembrance" in the retrospective mini-series DC Universe: Legacies #4, set during a reunion on July 4, 1976, it is revealed that the Losers did survive the end of the war. Storm works for the Bureau of Disabled Veterans Affairs, Gunner is a veterinarian in memory of the now-dead Pooch, Sarge owns a string of service stations along the East Coast and Johnny Cloud is a third-term congressman. The other attendees are Jeb Stuart of the Haunted Tank, Gravedigger, Mademoiselle Marie and possibly the Unknown Soldier.

An alternative ending was presented in the out-of-continuity 2004 miniseries DC: The New Frontier. In it, the group was sent to Dinosaur Island during December 1945 to rescue Rick Flag and important war-time information. Once they go on the island, one by one, they are killed due to the dangers of the island. Gunner is smashed by a Tyrannosaurus rex, Storm is snatched by flying beasts, Sarge vanishes while trying to kill the same T. rex and is presumed dead. Pooch is hit by a booby trap set by a marooned Rick Flag. Johnny Cloud, after ensuring Flag can conclude the mission, sacrifices himself in a revenge mission on the same T. rex by falling down its throat with live hand grenades. Their epitaph, of sorts, was written by Johnny Cloud: "Ask my family and they'll tell you I was a Navajo. Ask the Army Air Force and they'll say I was an American. But if you ask my brothers, they'll set you straight. John Cloud was a Loser".

== The Losers (Vertigo series) ==
A new The Losers series began during 2004, created by writer Andy Diggle and artist Jock and published under DC's Vertigo imprint. The new series, set in the present, concerns a team of special forces soldiers who declare war on the Central Intelligence Agency after their Agency handler tries to assassinate them. It was initially inspired by and intended to be a continuation of the original series, with the unit having survived their final mission and getting back together in the 1950s for a caper story.

== Our Fighting Forces #1 (2010 one-shot) ==
In 2010 DC published five one-shots featuring characters and titles revived from their "classic" war comics line, including Our Fighting Forces, featuring The Losers. The one-shot was written by B. Clay Moore and drawn by Chad Hardin and Wayne Faucher. The story featured the "classic" team of Johnny Cloud, Captain Storm and Gunner & Sarge.

== Other versions ==
- An alternate timeline version of Gunner appears in the Flashpoint tie-in Lois Lane and the Resistance #2. This version was a member of Grifter's Team 7 before they are killed during a botched attack on a terrorist training camp.
- An alternate universe version of Gunner appears in E.V.E. Protomecha (1997). Originally a human soldier, he was converted into a giant robot to stop the titular character from killing three angels who had lived among humans for centuries. However, Gunner disobeys orders and leaves with Eve to see the world.

== Collected editions ==
- The Losers by Jack Kirby (collects Our Fighting Forces #151-162, 240 pages, hardcover, March 2009, ISBN 1-4012-2165-3)
- Showcase Presents: The Losers (collects G.I. Combat #138, Our Fighting Forces #123-150, 456 pages, softcover, April 2012, ISBN 1-4012-3437-2)

== In other media ==
=== Film ===
- The original Losers make a cameo appearance in a newspaper photograph in Justice League: The New Frontier.
- The Losers appear in a self-titled DC Showcase short, consisting of Captain William Storm (voiced by Dean Winters), Gunner, Sarge (both voiced by Dave B. Mitchell), Johnny Cloud (voiced by Martin Sensmeier), and original character Henry "Mile a Minute" Jones (voiced by Eugene Byrd).
- A time-displaced incarnation of the Losers make a cameo appearance in Justice League: Crisis on Infinite Earths – Part Three, with Captain William Storm voiced again by Dean Winters.

=== Video games ===
The Losers appear as character summons in Scribblenauts Unmasked: A DC Comics Adventure.

== See also ==
- Jack Kirby bibliography
