= Unknown Soldier (DC Comics) =

Fictional character from the DC Universe

- Tim Bradstreet's front cover of Unknown Soldier #4 (1997)

Publication information
- Publisher: DC Comics/Vertigo
- First appearance: Our Army at War #168 (June 1966)
- Created by: Joe Kubert, Robert Kanigher, Irv Novick

In-story information
- Species: Human
- Team affiliations: U.S. Army; Suicide Squad
- Abilities: Weapons expert, master of disguise, and expert combatant.

Unknown Soldier is a fictional war comics character in the DC Comics Universe. The character was created by Joe Kubert, Robert Kanigher and Irv Novick, first appearing in Our Army At War #168 (June 1966).

The original character is an American military intelligence agent of uncertain identy, whose face was severely disfigured and who becomes a master of disguise. He named after The Tomb of the Unknown Soldier at Arlington National Cemetery, Virginia (which occasionally makes appearances in the series). Subsequent versions of the Unknown Soldier have used different origin stories.

== Publication history ==
=== First ongoing series ===
The Unknown Soldier's first appearance in Our Army At War #168 was in a Sgt. Rock story, "I Knew The Unknown Soldier!", written by Robert Kanigher and drawn by Joe Kubert. Kubert, who also edited the DC Comics line of war comics at the time, decided the character was interesting enough to be featured in his own series, which began some years later in Star Spangled War Stories, running from issues #151 (June–July 1970) to 204 (February 1977). Eventually, Star Spangled War Stories began featuring the Soldier exclusively. With issue #205 (May 1977), the book changed its title to The Unknown Soldier, continuing the numbering and running for another 64 issues, ending with #268 (October 1982).

The series takes place during World War II, and focuses on the missions of a United States intelligence agent code-named "The Unknown Soldier", whose head and face are so severely disfigured that he typically has it completely wrapped in heavy bandages. Despite this, he is a master of disguise who can assume the identity of almost any man using latex masks and make-up. However, his disguises occasionally itch where they meet the scar tissue of his face, forcing him to be conscious not to give himself away by scratching. He is also prone to loss of temper at enemy atrocities and has been seen to blow his cover in this manner.

Other writers contributing stories to the original run included Bob Haney, Frank Robbins, Archie Goodwin and David Michelinie. Artists also included Dick Ayers, Doug Wildey, Dan Spiegle, Jack Sparling and Gerry Talaoc. Back-up features included "Enemy Ace" by Robert Kanigher and John Severin, and "Captain Fear" by David Michelinie and Walt Simonson.

The character of the Unknown Soldier is symbolic of the nameless soldiers who have fought in United States wars; as stated in his first featured story "They Came From Shangri-La!" (Star Spangled War Stories #151, June–July 1970), he is the "man who no one knows — but — is known by everyone!" Another nickname used in the series is "The Immortal G.I."

=== 1988 12-issue limited series ===
In 1988 and 1989, DC published a 12-issue limited series, also titled The Unknown Soldier, written by Jim Owsley and drawn by Phil Gascoine. Its depiction of this Soldier is radically different from the original one, with him being literally immortal and more cynical about the United States than the patriotic character of the original series. Unknown Soldier was a top vote-getter for the Comics Buyer's Guide Fan Award for Favorite Limited Series for 1988.

=== 1997 4-issue limited series ===
In 1997 Garth Ennis wrote Unknown Soldier, a four-issue mini-series under the Vertigo imprint, featuring art by Kilian Plunkett. A much darker portrayal of the Soldier, the story is about a CIA agent tracing the post-war activities of the Soldier and the Soldier searching for a replacement for himself. This story appeared to ignore the 1988–89 limited series, and was collected into a trade paperback in 1998.

=== Second ongoing series ===
A new Unknown Soldier series from Vertigo, set in Uganda, was written by Joshua Dysart, with art by Alberto Ponticelli. It began publication in October 2008. In 2009 this run was nominated for an Eisner Award for "Best New Series of the Year". The series started in October 2008, planned as an ongoing series, but was canceled in May 2010 due to low readership. Writer Dysart had this to say on the cancellation:

"The gig is, literally, up. Since Rich Johnston posted the news yesterday that Unknown Soldier will end with #25 I've been swamped with ... loving emails from readers. The outpouring of affection and praise has been amazing. Thank you. The book may not have moved "enough" of ... you to keep it alive, but it moved enough of you for me. Thank you. I promise the book will end in an awesome, natural way and that when ... read in trades, will feel like it was always meant to conclude this way. I've been preparing for this cancellation for a while and have ... had plenty of time to sing it out right. I actually really, really like the way the series is going to end and feel like it should end ... This way. Keep reading! Five more issues!"

In total, the series ran for two years and 25 issues. Issues #13-14 were given a 2010 Glyph Comics Award for "Story of the Year". In addition, issues #1 (cover illustrated by Igor Kordey) and 5 (cover illustrated by Dave Johnson) were given Glyph Comics Awards for "Best Cover".

=== Later appearances ===
A figure similar in appearance to the original Unknown Soldier appears to exit the Tomb of the Unknown Soldier in Blackest Night #3 and is seen again in issue #4 battling Wonder Woman.

The New 52 iteration of the Unknown Soldier appeared in back-up stories in G.I. Combat from its launch in 2012 to its cancellation in 2013. He was also the focus of the series' issue #0 in November 2012. He later appeared in issues of Suicide Squad.

== Fictional character biography ==
=== Eddie Ray ===
In Star Spangled War Stories #153 (reprinted from issue #36 with a new framing sequence), by Robert Kanigher and Irv Novick, a soldier named Eddie Ray is introduced. His Serial Number is 32891681 which can be read on pages 5–6. Although he is not confirmed as the identity of the Unknown Soldier, it is strongly hinted at because his face is never shown. The origin story in Star Spangled War Stories #154 (December–January 1970 – 1971) reveals the Unknown Soldier is an unnamed young man who joins the United States Army together with his brother Harry less than two months before the Japanese attack on Pearl Harbor. Assigned to the Philippines when the Pacific War breaks out, he and Harry are present when the Japanese sweep across the islands. In their foxhole, Harry tells his brother not to lose hope even though they are outnumbered, because "one guy can affect the outcome of a whole war! One guy in the right place... at the right time..."

The two are fighting off invading Japanese soldiers when a hand grenade lands near their foxhole. Harry throws himself on the grenade and is killed instantly, but the explosion also injures the unnamed soldier's face. In a rage, the soldier defeats the remaining Japanese single-handedly, but his face has been obliterated by the grenade and doctors are unable to restore it. Turning down a Medal of Honor for his actions, the soldier instead volunteers to be that "one man in the right place" that Harry spoke of. His previous identity is erased and he undergoes intensive training to become an intelligence operative code-named "The Unknown Soldier".

The series was not published in a straightforward chronology, has individual stories scattered throughout all the years of the war and in various theaters. Over the course of the series, the Unknown Soldier also builds up a supporting cast, including Sergeant Chat Noir, an African American soldier and former French Resistance leader whom the Soldier first encounters a few days prior to D-Day. The Soldier also occasionally uses the services of an informant known only as Sparrow, who works behind enemy lines.

The last issue of the first series, The Unknown Soldier #268, "A Farewell to War" relates how during the Battle of Berlin, the Unknown Soldier is sent on a mission to stop a Nazi super-weapon, vampiric octopuses called "Nosferatu". During the course of the story both Sparrow and Chat Noir are killed. On April 29, 1945, the Soldier infiltrates Adolf Hitler's bunker, killing him and assuming the dictator's identity to call off the weapon's deployment. He then makes Hitler's death look like a suicide so people will assume Hitler took the coward's way out. As the Soldier makes his way to the Allied lines, he saves the life of a civilian girl from a bomb blast, apparently being killed himself. However, the last panel, taking place on May 7, 1945 after the city's surrender, shows an American staff sergeant scratching his face in the Soldier's distinctive manner, suggesting that he survived.

In DC Comics Presents #42 (February 1982), "The Specter of War!", Superman's alter-ego Clark Kent receives a mysterious note from an unidentified soldier, which leads him to uncover a plan by a renegade Army officer to cause a nuclear holocaust. Throughout, Superman is assisted at key moments by the mysterious soldier, whom he later believes could be the legendary immortal G.I. It is left ambiguous if the Unknown Soldier is still alive or a ghost. At the end of the story, Kent visits the Tomb of the Unknown Soldier, while a gardener in the background is seen scratching his face as the Soldier used to do.

In Swamp Thing #82 (January 1989), "Brothers In Arms Part Two", it is revealed that the Soldier did survive World War II, but his continued existence is kept top secret, having been officially declared dead by his superiors.

During the Blackest Night event, the Soldier is depicted as one of the Black Lanterns, attacking his tomb in Washington proclaiming "I have a name". The Unknown Soldier appears in the Arlington National Cemetery, alongside the Black Lantern Maxwell Lord, and is attacked by Wonder Woman. Wonder Woman uses her Lasso to reduce Unknown Soldier, Max, and the soldiers to dust. However, as she leaves, the dust begins to regenerate.

In the backup story "Snapshot: Remembrance" in the retrospective mini-series DC Universe: Legacies #4, set during a reunion on July 4, 1976, it is implied that the Soldier did survive the war, when the bartender at the reunion vanishes, leaving behind a mask. The other attendees are Jeb Stuart of the Haunted Tank, the Losers, Gravedigger and Mademoiselle Marie.

=== Jack Helfer ===
This modern version of the Unknown Soldier, created by Christopher Priest and Phil Gascoine, is a bitter soldier, who has made a career of doing what he was told, that has changed, becoming disillusioned. He is the benefactor of a bio-restorative formula that increases muscle density and accelerates the healing process, giving him immunity to most poisons and diseases. The Soldier claims to be immortal, and is believed that he may in fact be, because it also retards his aging process.

=== Moses Lwanga ===
Unknown Soldier was re-imagined by writer Joshua Dysart in 2008, under DC's Vertigo imprint. This new version moves the story to Africa, set against the backdrop of the ongoing Lord's Resistance Army insurgency of Uganda in 2002. The series features artwork by Alberto Ponticelli, Pat Masioni, Oscar Celestini, José Villarrubia, Dave Johnson; and lettering by Clem Robins.

Dr. Moses Lwanga is a philanthropic-minded doctor. Born in Uganda, his family fled to the United States when he was a child, escaping the rule of Idi Amin. A born pacifist, Moses excelled academically in America, eventually becoming a medical doctor in Harvard with his parents' support. In 2000, Moses returned to Uganda to work with the disadvantaged people of his native land. There, he met his wife, Sera, a Christian doctor from the Ganda people. Moses and Sera work together to help the Acholi people of northern Uganda, refugees caught in the middle of the Lord's Resistance Army insurgency in Acholiland. As the series progresses, Moses continues struggling to do what is right, his two personalities constantly battling. While he wants to do good and protect the innocent from those who would seek to exploit and harm them, he cannot repress his violent thoughts upon seeing how low mankind can sink.

Moses is constantly haunted by dreams of him killing the people around him easily and brutally, including his wife. Disturbed by these nightmares, the violence surrounding the field hospital and his treatment of various injuries caused by the fighting strip away his deteriorating moral compass. He finally breaks, running from a hospital camp in response to the alleged rape of a girl, where he comes in to contact with child rebel fighters. He disarms and kills one, finally shattering his pacifist beliefs, which causes him to take a rock and self-mutilate his face in a violent delirium. He is taken in by a local Catholic convent that is attempting to shelter girls from rebel groups that come to take them as wives, and his face is bandaged. As he is coming to grips with his violent killing, the convent is attacked and the girls are all captured, with the rebel leader only giving up ten to the convent's Australian nun who comes begging for their freedom. Moses takes it upon himself to rescue the remaining twenty, and ends up murdering even more child militants in the process, using some innate combat skills that he fails to understand the source of. These events attract the attention of the CIA, who coerce an AWOL operative in the area, Jack Lee Howl, to track him down.

The convent is ultimately destroyed despite Moses' efforts, and the nun returns to her home country. Moses' violent alter ego comes to light as a violent man that is highly deft at using close combat and modern firepower to kill scores of enemy forces, and manifests itself as a voice in his head, which he eventually self-diagnoses as multiple personality disorder. Despite his alter ego's influence on his actions, it can not do anything Moses himself does not want to do. Moses' rage at the corrupt systems at play in Uganda cause him to seek to destroy the Lord's Resistance Army and kill Joseph Kony, and the alter ego seizes upon this as a war for him to fight. He begins carrying out one-man raids and directs all child soldiers that give up their arms to rehabilitation centers across the country—one of whom is Paul, a child conscripted in to the LRA as a pack mule and radio operator. Moses does manage to return to his old camp once to Sera, and they are able to spend a night together. However, rebels attack and the two are separated in the chaos.

Jack, despite running in to Moses a couple times and establishing a connection with Moses' now estranged wife Sera, is unable to manipulate him for the CIA. It is only when a group seeking to assassinate a famous American actress and humanitarian, Margaret Wells, reaches Moses through Jack do the two finally cooperate. Moses, despite acknowledging her good intentions, agrees to carry out the assassination "for the greater good", but his use of landmines ends up killing a convoy of innocent herders. In the confusion, Wells' UN escort intercept Moses, who was injured in his attempt to stop the convoy. Moses discovers that Wells is coordinating a benefit dinner "in the memory of Moses Lwanga", and eventually is exiled from the group due to his angry outburst when he accuses Wells of trying to use rich people's money to solve Uganda's problems. Meanwhile, his failure to assassinate her convinces the group to do it themselves at the benefit dinner. Moses, realizing the group's twisted actions would not pin the blame and thus the world's attention on the LRA, thwarts the assassination with Jack's help and connections to the would-be assassins. Though Moses' operation is successful, he is unable to reconcile his killing of innocent civilians with Sera and his past life, and leaves her behind once again to continue his battle against the LRA.

Moses finds Paul waiting for him at one of his old campsites, where he reveals that the center he was sent to is not free of the effects of the war. Moses finally agrees to take the child back to his home village, which turns out to have turned in to a refugee camp. There, Moses undergoes a traditional ritual that he thinks has cleaned him of his sins, and thus his "alter ego". Right after their arrival, the local doctor is murdered—through an investigation in to an elaborate arms deal for stolen medicine plot, Moses finds that it was his alter ego who murdered the doctor due to his own subconscious desire to take the doctor's place and be "Dr. Lwanga" once again. Moses kills the local garrison's corrupt army official and his soldiers, thwarts the official's arms deal plot, and finds the stolen medicine, which his alter ego had hidden away from the reaches of the army. To escape the wrath of the herders, who had expected the weapons in the deal, he leaves Paul and the village, entrusting the medicine to the next village doctor.

After smuggling out a family besieged by raiders from their hiding spot on a hill, Moses makes a last stand there, fighting against scores of armed herders. He is rescued by American forces in helicopters, who are finally able to capture him and return him to the CIA, which wishes to use him as a supersoldier.

In a flashback, it is revealed that the persona of Dr. Moses Lwanga is a fabrication resulting from an unknown psychological experiment overseen by the original Unknown Soldier. The man who would assume the identity of Moses Lwanga is a Ugandan-American man who came to the United States at the age of six, orphaned at thirteen, raised in foster care, and later served in the military to avoid prison, experiencing combat in South America and the Middle East. "Lwanga", who has been brainwashed of all these experiences, is shown speaking with the original Unknown Soldier in a secret government facility. The Unknown Soldier tells "Lwanga" his story, detailing his exploits as a black operations operative for over a fifty-year period after a tortured service in the Pacific front of World War 2. He goes on to tell "Lwanga" that there have been numerous psychological experiments conducted in order to recreate the perfect soldier but none have been successful; all of the candidates went insane, except for "Lwanga". He then announces that instead of creating another operative whose sole purpose is to fight, he wishes to do the opposite; take a man who has known conflict for most of his life and make him an instrument of peace, dedicated to doing good for the rest of his life. "Lwanga" agrees, becoming Dr. Moses Lwanga. However, Moses' exposure to violence in his medical camp effective triggered his combat conditioning, and his alter ego emerged as the next "Unknown Soldier", discarding morality to engage in eternal warfare. This Unknown Soldier, seeing parallels in his past life as a 20th-century black ops operative to Kony's actions in orchestrating the suffering of millions, seizes on the opportunity to kill Kony as a form of redemption. Upon discovering his alter ego is indeed no less false than his "true" one, Moses gives the Unknown Soldier full reign over his body. He is able to escape the CIA with the help of Jack, who tips off Sera to his location. The Unknown Soldier, still locked in to war with Joseph Kony, confronts Sera once last time, finally telling her the man that she knew as Moses was completely gone.

In the final issue, the Unknown Soldier infiltrates Kony's camp, intending to kill him once and for all. Although a child soldier guarding Kony's personal tent shoots him, he shrugs off the bullets and enters the tent. After he finally plants his knife in Kony's eye, the dead man's subordinates and wives celebrate his demise. Sera appears, telling the Soldier/Moses that no matter who he is, she always loved him, and the two embrace; however, this pleasant vision is a dream, and it is shown that he had actually been shot in the head before ever reaching Kony. In a symbolic conclusion of his morality arc, it turns out that he didn't kill a single person in Kony's camp, instead throwing its garrison of child soldiers in to disarray, who assume there is a much larger force due to a huge amount of diversionary gunfire and explosives. In a pacifistic bliss, he is only killed in a standoff after he refuses to shoot the child soldier guarding Kony's tent. Though his final mission is a failure, he dies at peace reunited with Sera, finally taking on his previous identity as Moses Lwanga.

In the epilogue, Sera remarries to a Muslim journalist who had covered the exploits of her husband as the Unknown Soldier: the two have several children and live as a family. Jack continues to live in Africa, finally having escaped the CIA's grasp on him. Kony, true to events at the end of the story's publishing in 2010, is shown to have been pushed out of northern Uganda, but still active in certain areas in Africa. The story then cuts to Tumbura, Sudan in 2010, where several child soldiers are gearing up for combat against Kony's LRA. One of the children wraps his face in bandages like the Unknown Soldier.

=== The New 52 ===
In 2011, "The New 52" rebooted the DC universe. The Unknown Soldier has appeared in the comic GI Combat written by Justin Gray and Jimmy Palmiotti where he is in Afghanistan and is fighting for the Americans. After the cancellation of GI Combat in 2012, The Unknown Soldier appeared in the Suicide Squad, brought in by Amanda Waller to be a new team leader.

In the series JSA, the Unknown Soldier appears in a flashback to 1945, where he helps Hourman, Wildcat, and Doctor Fate stop Wotan and Johnny Sorrow from using the Spear of Destiny to summon the Unnamed Ones. Sorrow states that it will take another 80 years before the ritual can be done again.

== Collected editions ==
Each of the Unknown Soldier series has been collected in the following trade paperbacks:

Title	Material collected	Publication date	ISBN
Showcase Presents: The Unknown Soldier Vol. 1	Unknown Soldier stories from Star Spangled War Stories #151-190 (1970–1975)	November 2006	978-1401210908
Haunted House	Unknown Soldier (2008 series) issues #1-6	August 2009	978-1401223113
Easy Kill	Unknown Soldier (2008 series) issues #7-14	March 17, 2010	978-1401226008
Dry Season	Unknown Soldier (2008 series) issues #15-20	November 11, 2010	978-1401228552
Beautiful World	Unknown Soldier (2008 series) issues #21-25	May 25, 2011	978-1401231767
Unknown Soldier	Unknown Soldier vol. 3 (1997 limited series) #1-4	March 2014	978-1401244170
Showcase Presents: The Unknown Soldier Vol. 2	Star Spangled War Stories #191-204, Unknown Soldier #205-216	January 2015	978-1401240813

== In other media ==
The Unknown Soldier makes a cameo appearance in the Stargirl television series, via a film poster.
