= Mademoiselle Marie =

Publication information
- Publisher: DC Comics
- First appearance: Star Spangled War Stories #84 (August 1959)
- Created by: Robert Kanigher (writer); Jerry Grandenetti (artist)

In-story information
- Alter ego: (original) Marie (current) Josephine Tautin
- Team affiliations: (original) French Resistance (current) Checkmate
- Abilities: Markswoman

Mademoiselle Marie (often shortened to Mlle. Marie) is the name of two fictional characters appearing in comic books published by DC Comics. She first appeared in Star Spangled War Stories #84 (August 1959), and was created by Robert Kanigher and Jerry Grandenetti. She was based in part on several actual members of the French resistance, most notably Simone Segouin.

== Fictional character biography ==
=== Original ===
The original Mademoiselle Marie was introduced in Star Spangled War Stories #84, created by Robert Kanigher and Jerry Grandenetti. Marie (last name unknown) was a French farm girl who joined the French Resistance during World War II. The red beret-wearing character is notable as being the only love interest of Sgt. Rock.

In Pre-Crisis continuity it was revealed that Marie had a daughter named Julia Remarque. The father of her child was Batman's butler Alfred Pennyworth, who was an intelligence agent in France during the war.

=== Legacy ===
At some point following World War II the name of Mademoiselle Marie became a code name awarded to agents of the French intelligence agency, the DGSE. Josephine Tautin, introduced in Checkmate Vol. 2 #5, uses the name in her capacity as the member of Checkmate known as the Black Queen's Knight. Relatively little has been revealed of Tautin's background as yet, save that she was the only Knight candidate able to pass Checkmate's admission tests by displaying sufficient cold-bloodedness.

A retcon in Checkmate Vol. 2 #21 reveals that the Madmoiselle Marie codename in fact dates to before World War II. Flashbacks in this story show earlier characters using the name rescuing nobles from the French Revolution in 1791, and defending Louis-Philippe from assassins during the July Revolution of 1830 and that the various Maries were, themselves, assassins. Another flashback reveals that there were a number of Madmoiselle Maries during World War II, one of whom (Sabine Roth) later trained Josephine Tautin.

In Checkmate Vol. 2 #22, Tautin goes on a one-woman mission to rescue Madeleine Desmarais (the daughter of her former supervisor and lover) from a terrorist camp. She shows her cool efficiency and ruthlessness as a killer, poisoning a contact that tries to betray her by dosing him with a neurotoxin, then destroying the antidote after extorting the required information. She also kills everyone in the terrorist camp in the process of rescuing Madeleine. Her actions cause Checkmate to be criticized by the Secretary-General of the United Nations because one killing occurred in front of a news camera. He demands that Tautin be disciplined, but the Black Queen secretly commends her for her actions.

== Known Mademoiselle Maries ==
- Lady Elisabeth Saint-Marie who protected the nobility during the French Revolution. She appears in Checkmate #21 and 22.
- Countess Margaux de Mortain (c. 1830) guarded the life of Louis-Phillipe during the July Revolution and saved his life at the expense of her own, killed while saving the new King and General Gilbert du Motier, marquis de La Fayette at the Hôtel de Ville, Paris on July 31, 1830. She appears in Checkmate #21 and 22.
- Marie Salomon (c. 1916) was an actress and model who defended the Sacred Road during the Battle of Verdun. She appears in a gatefold page of other Maries in Checkmate #22.
- Zoe Magnier (c. November 1940) was a mother of two who was part of the forces of General Charles de Gaulle during the Battle of Gabon. She appears in a gatefold page of other Maries in Checkmate #22.
- Simone Michel-Levy (c. late 1940) was a member of the Brotherhood of Notre Dame during the early stages of World War II. She was crucial to the French victory at Bruneval. She later encountered the Unknown Soldier while he posed as a German officer, though the exact circumstances of that adventure are unknown. She appears in a gatefold page of other Maries in Checkmate #22.
- Anais Guillot is the name of the most well known World War II-era Mademoiselle Marie. She undertook several missions for the French Resistance and had a romantic relationship with Sgt. Rock of Easy Company. She was also one of the French Maquis who fought Germans at the Vercors Plateau. She was captured by Nazi forces and executed at Fontevraud Abbey on October 7, 1944, while attempting to assassinate Colonel Burkel. She is briefly shown in Checkmate #22, but in the backup story "Snapshot: Remembrance" in the retrospective mini-series DC Universe: Legacies #4, set during a reunion on July 4, 1976, it is revealed that she did survive the war. She is an ambassador and has a son who is a soldier and who the others at the reunion think resembles Sgt. Rock. The other attendees are Jeb Stuart of the Haunted Tank, the Losers, Gravedigger and possibly the Unknown Soldier.
- Sabine Roth (c. 1944 until the end of World War II) was just a schoolgirl when she took over the position of Mademoiselle Marie following the execution of Anais Guillot at Fontevraud. She was responsible for killing the Nazi Colonel Burkel, the Butcher of Fontevraud, Guillot's final mission. She appears in Checkmate #21 and 22.
- Josephine Isabel Tautin (c. 1998 to present) is the current incarnation.

== Alternate versions ==
Mademoiselle Peggy, an amalgamation of Mademoiselle Marie and Marvel Comics character Peggy Carter, appears in the Amalgam Comics one-shot Super-Soldier: Man of War #1.

== In other media ==
An unidentified Mademoiselle Marie makes a minor non-speaking appearance in Justice League: The New Frontier. This version works for King Faraday.
