= G.I. Combat =

American war comic (1952-87; 2012)

- G.I. Combat #168 (January 1974), cover art by Neal Adams.

Publication information
- Publisher: Quality Comics (1952–56); DC Comics (1957–1987, 2012–2013)
- Schedule: Monthly: #1–78, #158–170 #175–200, #221–277; Bimonthly: #79–157, #171–175 #201–220, #278–288
- Format: Ongoing series
- Genre: War
- Publication date: Vol. 1: October 1952–March 1987; Vol. 2: July 2012– February 2013
- No. of issues: Vol. 1: 288; Vol. 2: 8 (#1–7 plus issue numbered 0)
- Main character: The Haunted Tank

Creative team
- Written by: List: Vol. 1: Archie Goodwin, Robert Kanigher, George Kashdan Vol. 2: Justin Gray, J. T. Krul, Jimmy Palmiotti, Peter Tomasi
- Penciller: List: Vol. 1: Neal Adams, Ross Andru, Sam Glanzman, Jerry Grandenetti, Joe Kubert Vol. 2: Howard Chaykin, Staz Johnson, Ariel Olivetti, Dan Panosian
- Inker: List: Vol. 1: Mike Esposito
- Editor: List: Robert Kanigher (#44–129) Joe Kubert (#130–157) Archie Goodwin (#158–173) Murray Boltinoff (#174–288)

G.I. Combat is an American comics anthology featuring war stories. It was published from 1952 until 1956 by Quality Comics, followed by DC Comics until its final issue in 1987. In 2012 it was briefly revived.

== Publication history ==
The focus was on stories about American soldiers or G.I.s. Initially, the stories involved Cold War adventures with strong anti-Communist themes, but over time the focus shifted to tales from World War II, and most of the stories after Quality ceased publishing the title were set during this period. As with other media, the World War II setting was sometimes used to discuss themes pertinent to contemporary conflicts such as the Vietnam War.

The first issue of G.I. Combat was published in October 1952. When DC Comics acquired the rights to the Quality Comics characters and titles, they continued publishing the series starting with issue #44 (January 1957). G.I. Combat and Blackhawk were the only Quality titles which DC continued publishing. Many notable writers and artists worked on G.I. Combat during its run, including Robert Kanigher, who also edited the title, Joe Kubert, Jerry Grandenetti and Neal Adams.

Each issue of G.I. Combat contained several short comic stories, a format that continued throughout its run. There were several recurring features in the DC Comics version of the title, including most notably "The Haunted Tank", which first appeared in issue #87 (May 1961) and ran until 1987. The Losers' first appearance as a group was with the Haunted Tank crew in issue #138 (Oct.-Nov. 1969), in a story titled "The Losers". Other recurring features included "The Bravos of Vietnam" (about U.S. Marines in the Vietnam War) and late in its run, a return to Cold War themes with a short-lived recurring feature about 1980s mercenaries. Beginning with issue #201 (April–May 1977), G.I. Combat was DC's only war comic to be upgraded to its "Dollar Comics" line, with additional pages of content beyond the then-standard 32-page format. The Dollar Comic format was used through issue #259 (November 1983). The series continued in a 52-page giant-sized format through issue #281 (January 1986) before returning to a standard 32 page size with #282 (March 1986).

The Monitor's first full appearance was in G.I. Combat #274 (February 1985). By the 1980s, war comics grew less marketable and Sgt. Rock, The Unknown Soldier, and Weird War Tales were discontinued. G.I. Combat's final issue was #288 (March 1987).

=== 2012 series ===
DC launched a new G.I. Combat ongoing series (cover dated July 2012) as part of The New 52. Featured stories included "The War that Time Forgot" by writer J. T. Krul and artist Ariel Olivetti, with back up stories starring the Unknown Soldier by writers Justin Gray and Jimmy Palmiotti with art by Dan Panosian. The Haunted Tank feature began in issue #5. The new series was canceled as of issue #7 on sale in December 2012 and cover dated February 2013.

== Collected editions ==
- Sgt. Rock Archives Vol. 1 includes G.I. Combat #68, 240 pages, May 2002, ISBN 978-1-56389-841-9
- America at War includes G.I. Combat #87: "Introducing -- the Haunted Tank" by Robert Kanigher and Russ Heath, 247 pages, July 1979, ISBN 978-0671249533
- Showcase Presents: Haunted Tank
  - Volume 1 collects G.I. Combat #87-119, 560 pages, May 2006, ISBN 1-4012-0789-8
  - Volume 2 collects G.I. Combat #120-157, 560 pages, June 2008, ISBN 978-1-4012-1793-8
- DC Through the 80s: The End of Eras collects G.I. Combat #288, 520 pages, December 2020, ISBN 978-1779500878
- G.I. Combat Vol. 1: The War That Time Forgot collects G.I. Combat vol. 2 #0-7, 224 pages, April 2013, ISBN 978-1-4012-3853-7
