= Tor (comics) =

Prehistoric human character

Tor, art by Joe Kubert.

Tor is an American comic book series, created by Joe Kubert and Norman Maurer in the story 1,000,000 Years Ago! (Sept. 1953), published by St. John Publications. The series' protagonist, Tor, is a prehistoric cave man who has fantasy adventures set in a realistically drawn setting. The original series only ran for five issues and ended in 1954. Tor was revived by DC Comics in June 1975 for six issues. In June 1993, Marvel Comics released new adventures of Tor.

== Concept ==
Tor is a prehistoric warrior. He is a loner whose only true friend is his pet monkey, Chee-Chee. Despite being drawn in a realistic style the stories were full with notable fantasy elements, including humans and dinosaurs living together in the same era and many animals being portrayed as prehistoric monsters, even ones who actually were herbivores.

== Backup stories ==
In addition to the stories about Tor, there were also stories about other characters, such as the humorous Wizard of Ugghh, by Norman Maurer, or Danny Dreams, where a teenage boy named Danny Wakely is always transported back to prehistoric times in his dreams.

== Publication history ==
Tor makes his first appearance as he rushes to aid his monkey Chee-Chee from the attack of a Brontosaurus-like carnivorous Dinosaur. From 1,000,000 Years Ago! #1 (1953) published by St. John Comics. Cover art by Joe Kubert.

After his debut in 1,000,000 Years Ago (St. John, September 1953), Tor immediately went on to become one of the first comic book characters to star in 3-D comic books. The second issue of that series was renamed 3-D Comics before being renamed Tor with issue #3 in May 1954. At this point the series was once again in the traditional two-dimensional format. This series lasted until issue #5 (October 1954).

In an interview, Kubert said: "Certainly in a superficial sense, Tor was my Tarzan. Of course, Tor wasn't raised by apes. He was raised by other primitive men and women. I suppose Tarzan and Tor are similar in that they are superior to the others of their clan. But with Tor, I chose to emphasize that he had an extra spark of humanity, and was instinctively striving for a better, more civilized way of life than that of his brothers".

In 1959, Kubert and inker Carmine Infantino unsuccessfully attempted to sell Tor as a newspaper comic strip. The samples consisted of 12 daily strips, reprinted in six pages in Alter Ego #10 (1969) and later expanded to 16 pages in DC Comics' Tor #1. DC Comics would publish the Tor series for 6 issues from 1974–1975.

Eclipse Comics reprinted the two 3-D Comics featuring Tor, both in 3-D and non-3-D versions in 1986. As well, the magazine Sojourn featured new Tor stories by Kubert, and in 1993, Marvel Comics' Epic imprint published the four-issue miniseries Tor, with new stories by Kubert, who had acquired and maintained rights to the character.

Alter Ego #77 (May 2008) has a long article on St. John comics by noted comic historian Ken Quattro. The cover reprints the cover of Tor #3 from the original artwork and there is a Roy Thomas interview with Joe Kubert about his experiences at St. John.

Between 2001 and 2003, DC Comics published a three volume hardcover reprint series called Tor, while in 2008, they published a new six issue miniseries. In 2009, DC published a hardcover collection called Tor: A Prehistoric Odyssey, while in 2010 they published it in the softcover format.

A two-page story drawn by comics legend Lou Fine in a toy company's custom one-shot, Wham-O Giant Comics (1967), starred a prehistoric man named Tor, but this character is unrelated to the same-name Kubert creation.

== Reception ==
In The Dinosaur Scrapbook, Donald F. Glut wrote about Tor: "Thanks to the work and obvious love that went into the series, what might have become a standard adventure strip, with man battling monster within the usual prehistoric-world settings, and situations, was elevated to art".

== Bibliography of the original publication ==
The first six comic books starring Tor were published under three different titles — the second of these in multiple 3-D editions:

- 1,000,000 Years Ago (Sept. 1953)

Tor in "Dawn", 11 pages + 1 extra page, 11-page reprint in DC's Tor #2; "Danny Dreams", 7 pages, reprinted in DC's Tor #2.

- 3-D Comics #2 (Oct. 1953)

"Tor" 8 pages; "Fire", 6 pages; "Imagine", 3 pages, both reprinted in DC's Tor #6.

- 3-D Comics #2 (Nov. 1953)

"Killer Man", 6 pages, reprinted in DC's Tor #4; "Giant-One", 10 pages + 2 extra pages, reprinted in DC's Tor #5; "The Run-Away".

- Tor #3 (May 1954)

"Isle of Fire", 11 pages reprinted in DC Tor 3; "Black Valley", 9 pages. reprinted in DC's "Tor" #4 with 1 extra page; "Danny Dreams", by Alex Toth.

- Tor #4 (July 1954)

"Red Death", 10 pages; "Last Chance", 4 pages; "Great Wolf", 7 pages.

- Tor #5 (Oct. 1954)

"Falling Fire", 10 pages; "Murder", 4 pages; "Man-Beast", 7 pages.

== Collected editions ==
Three hardback books published as the "DC Comics Joe Kubert Library" reprints the St. John comics from the 1950s, the stories of DC's 1975 Tor #1-6, and the 1993 Marvel/Epic miniseries Tor #1-4:

- Tor, Volume One - ISBN 1-56389-781-4
- Tor, Volume Two - ISBN 1-56389-830-6
- Tor, Volume Three - ISBN 1-56389-998-1
- Tor: A Prehistoric Odyssey

== Other similarly named cavemen ==
In 1941 Willy Vandersteen already drew a gag-a-day comic about a caveman named Tor. Later Johnny Hart had a caveman named Thor appearing in his gag-a-day series B.C., named after a friend whose name was Thornton Kinney.
