= Lou Ferstadt =

American painter (1900–1954)

Louis Ferstadt
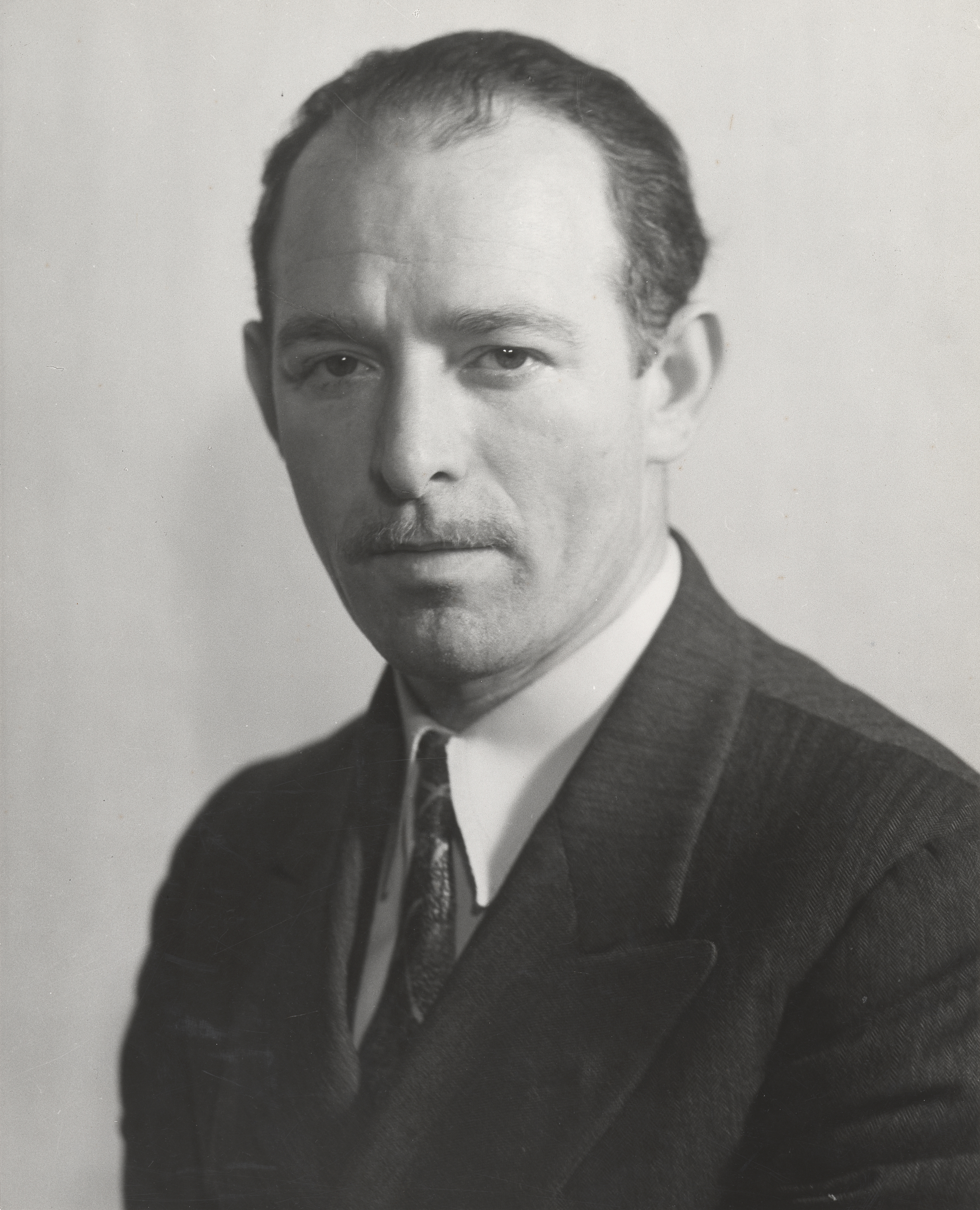
- Louis Goodman Ferstadt, from the Archives of American Art
- Born: 1900
- Died: 1954 (aged 53–54); New York City
- Known for: Painting, muralist, comics

Louis Goodman Ferstadt (7 October 1900 – August 1954) was an American muralist and comics artist.

== Biography ==
Louis Goodman Ferstadt was born in Berestechko in the Russian Empire on 7 October 1900. His early childhood coincided with a pogrom and in 1910, his family emigrated to Chicago in the United States. Louis studied at Hull House, The School of the Art Institute of Chicago from 1918 to 1922 and worked as an artist for the Chicago Tribune for a time.

He was a member of the Art Students League of Chicago in 1923. Ferstadt later won a scholarship to the Art Students League of New York at the age of 23 and moved to New York City. He later studied at The Educational Alliance art school after his scholarship funds were depleted. In 1926–1927, Ferstadt did a comic strip called The Kids on Our Block in the New York Evening Graphic.

He painted murals at the RCA Building and the Eighth Street Subway station in New York City on the occasion of the 1939 World's Fair. He drew comics, including "Chuck", "Mr. Risk", and "The Bouncer". Ferstadt identified as a communist and regularly contributed comic strips for the Daily Worker newspaper.

Ferstadt died of a heart attack at a campsite in Phoenicia, New York, in August 1954. His collection of art lie in the New York Public Library, Whitney Museum of American Art, the Tel Aviv Museum and the Jewish museum of Birobidzhan.

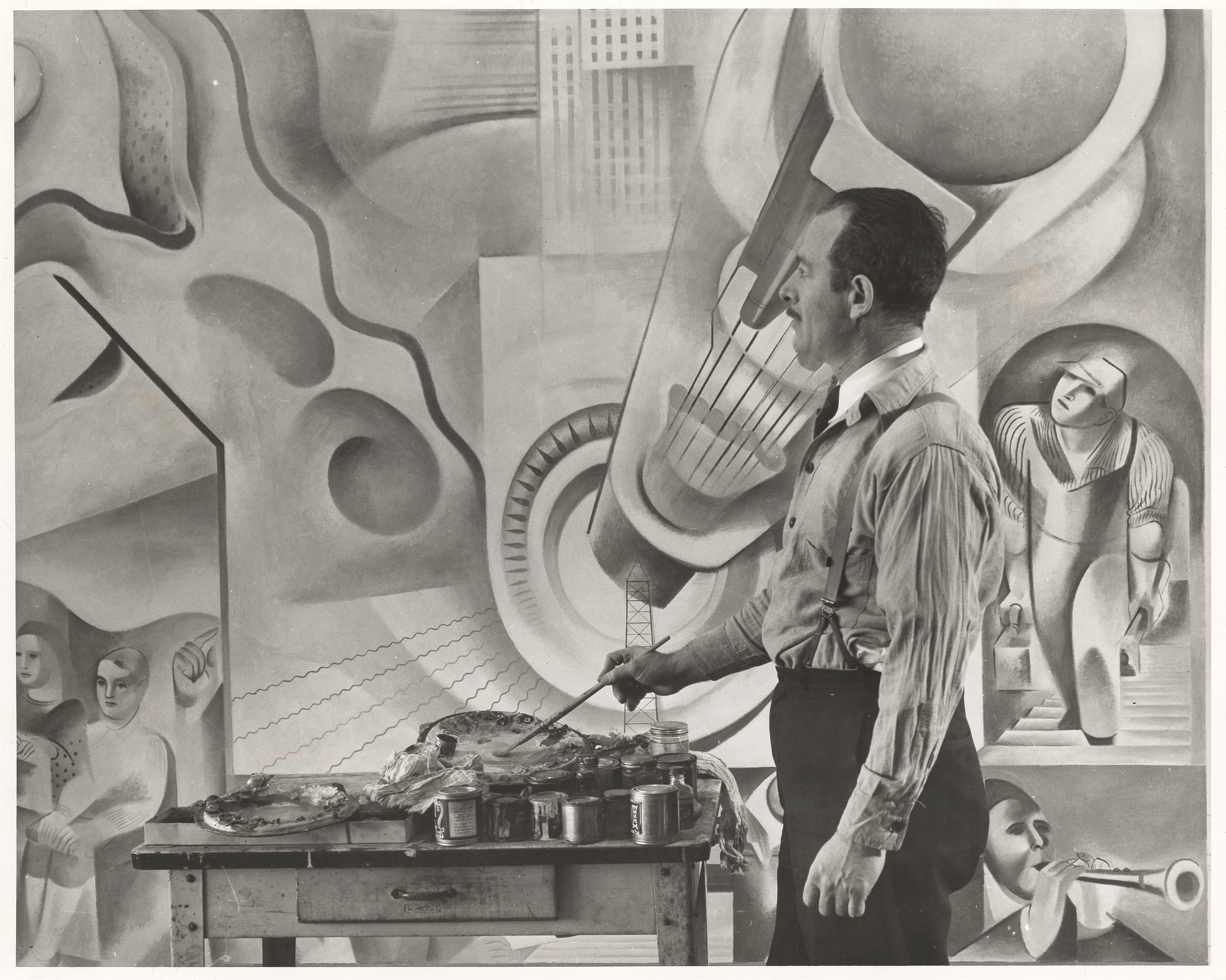
Ferstadt working as part of the New Deal
