= Bouncer (Fox Feature Syndicate) =

The Bouncer
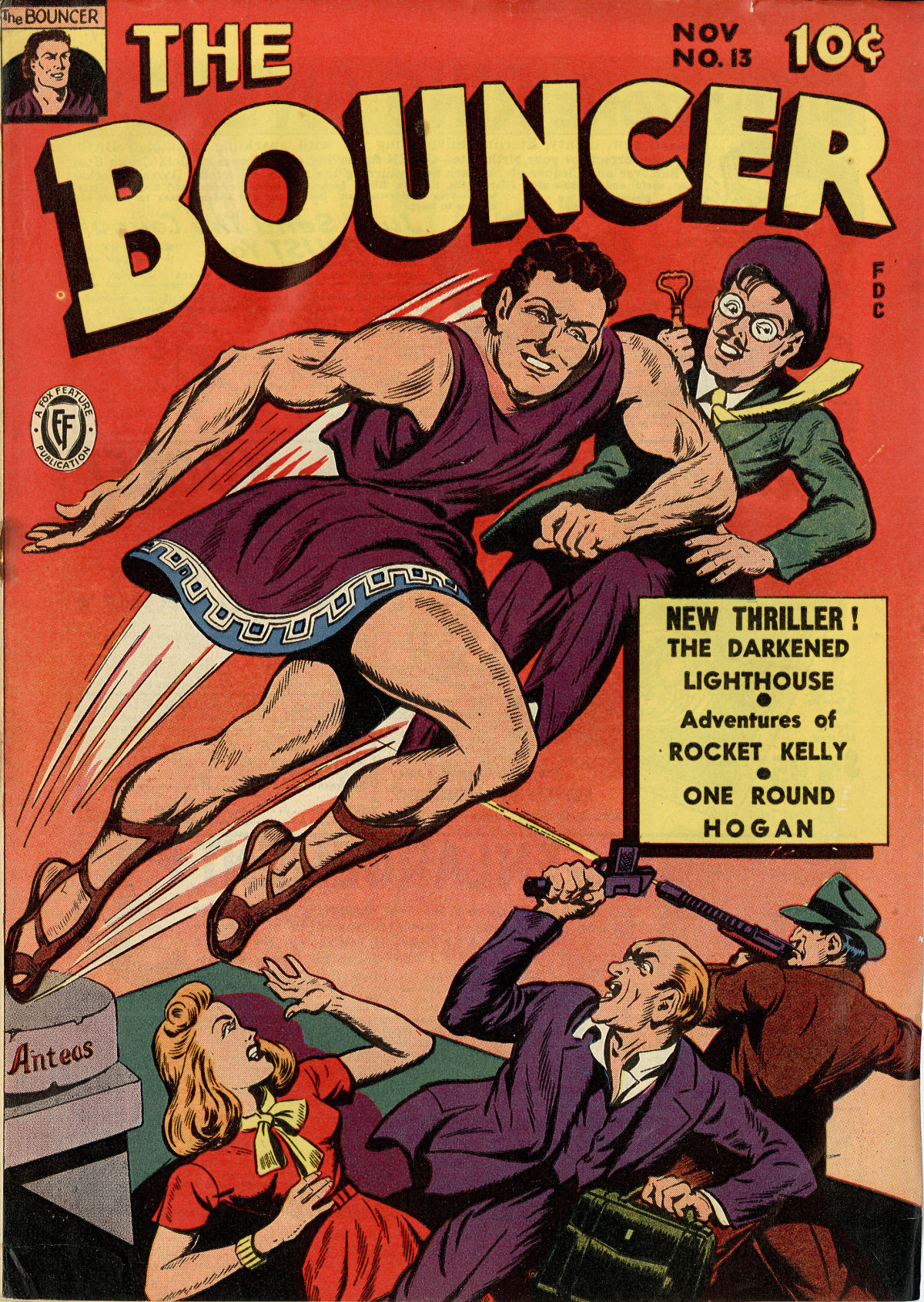
- The Bouncer, on the cover of issue #13; Adam Anteas, Jr. is on the right.

Publication information
- Publisher: Fox Feature Syndicate
- First appearance: The Bouncer (1944)
- Created by: Robert Kanigher (writer); Louis Ferstadt (artist)

In-story information
- Species: Animated statue
- Abilities: Superhuman strength Great leaping

The Bouncer is a superhero who appeared in comic books published by Fox Feature Syndicate. The Bouncer had no secret identity, but was in reality a statue of the Greek mythological figure Antaeus (spelled Anteas in the comics). The statue had been sculpted by Adam Anteas, Jr., a descendant of the very same legendary figure. Like his Greek ancestor, Anteas Jr. gained power when in contact with the earth. Anteas Jr.'s power was that he bounced back whenever he struck the ground; the harder he hit, the higher he bounced. Like his ancestor, he lost his power when out of contact with the ground.

The Bouncer appeared in five issues of his self-titled comic. The first issue (1944) didn't have an issue number; the other four were numbered #11 to 14 (Sept 1944 - Jan 1945). It's possible that the numbering was intended to be a continuation of The Green Mask. He is the first comic book character created by writer Robert Kanigher.

== Biography ==
At first Anteas Jr. had no interest in superheroics, and generally wanted to be left alone with his statues. But whenever he was threatened, the spirit of his ancestor would animate the statue, and drag its creator off on an adventure. Eventually Anteas Jr. began to seek out criminals, and fight them with the aid of the Bouncer. One of his foes is a clown who claims to be Satan. He also fought gangsters trying to access a vein of gold buried underneath a cemetery, as well as a villain called the Gold Bug.

== Powers and abilities ==
The Bouncer was an inanimate statue until animated by the spirit of Anteas. During that time, the Bouncer had superhuman strength and the ability to leap great distances. Adam Anteas Jr. has the ability to summon the Bouncer to his current location. When Adam does so, the Bouncer appears in a puff of smoke.
