= Our Army at War =

American comic book series

- Cover to Our Army at War #1 (August 1952), art by Carmine Infantino and Joe Giella.

Publication information
- Publisher: DC Comics
- Schedule: Monthly
- Format: Ongoing series
- Genre: War
- Publication date: August 1952 – February 1977
- No. of issues: 301
- Main character(s): Sgt. Rock and Easy Company

Creative team
- Written by: List: Hank Chapman, Sam Glanzman, Bob Haney, France Herron, Robert Kanigher, Howard Liss
- Penciller: List: Neal Adams, Ross Andru, Sam Glanzman, Joe Kubert, John Severin, Alex Toth
- Inker: Mike Esposito
- Editor: List: Robert Kanigher (#1–193) Joe Kubert (#194–301)

Our Army at War is an American comic book anthology published by DC Comics that featured war-themed stories and featured the first appearances of Sgt. Rock and Enemy Ace. The series was published from August 1952 to February 1977, then was renamed Sgt. Rock in March 1977, continuing the numbering sequence of Our Army at War.

== Publication history ==
Our Army at War was launched in August 1952 as part of a wave of war comics. The stories were often followed by tag lines such as "Explosive Battle Action". One of the main characters was Sgt. Rock, who appeared in #81 (April 1959) as Sgt. Rocky along with his team, Easy Company. The character got his final name in issue #83. Writer Robert Kanigher and artist Joe Kubert introduced Enemy Ace in #151 (February 1965). Artist Neal Adams made his DC Comics debut with the story "It's My Turn to Die", written by Howard Liss, in issue #182 (July 1967). Writer/artist Sam Glanzman began his series of biographical war stories about his service aboard the U.S.S. Stevens in issue #218 (April 1970). Three issues of the series, #242 (February 1972), #269 (June 1974), and #275 (December 1974), were published in the 100 Page Super Spectacular format. The series' title was changed to Sgt. Rock with issue #302 (March 1977). An Our Army at War one-shot was published in November 2010.

== Collected editions ==
- Showcase Presents: Our Army at War collects Our Army at War #1–20, 512 pages, December 2010, ISBN 1-4012-2942-5
- America at War includes Our Army at War #67: "Push-Button War" by France Herron and John Severin; #83: "The Rock and the Wall!" by Robert Kanigher and Joe Kubert; #160: "What's the Color of Your Blood?" by Kanigher and Kubert; #235: "The Glory Boys" by Kanigher and Alex Toth; #233: "Head-Count" by Kanigher and Kubert; and #235: "Kamikaze" by Sam Glanzman, 247 pages, July 1979, ISBN 978-0671249533
- Sgt. Rock Archives
  - Volume 1 collects Our Army at War #81–96, 240 pages, May 2002, ISBN 978-1-56389-841-9
  - Volume 2 collects Our Army at War #97–110, 216 pages, December 2003, ISBN 978-1-4012-0146-3
  - Volume 3 collects Our Army at War #111–125, 224 pages, August 2005, ISBN 978-1-4012-0410-5
  - Volume 4 collects Our Army at War #126–137 and Showcase #45, 248 pages, October 2012, ISBN 978-1-4012-3726-4
- Showcase Presents: Sgt. Rock
  - Volume 1 collects Our Army at War #81–117, 544 pages, November 2007, ISBN 978-1-4012-1713-6
  - Volume 2 collects Our Army at War #118–148, 544 pages, November 2008, ISBN 1-4012-1984-5
  - Volume 3 collects Our Army at War #149–180, 512 pages, August 2010, ISBN 1-4012-2771-6
  - Volume 4 collects Our Army at War #181–216, 520 pages, February 2013, ISBN 1-4012-3811-4
- DC Finest
  - War: The Big Five Arrive collects Our Army at War #54–57, Star Spangled War Stories #53–56, G.I. Combat #44–47, Blackhawk #108–111, Our Fighting Forces #17–20, and All-American Men of War #41–44, 632 pages, November 2025, ISBN 978-1-7995-0324-8
  - Sgt. Rock: The Rock of Easy Co. collects Our Army at War #81–122 and G.I. Combat #68, 616 pages, May 2026, ISBN 978-1-7995-0809-0
- DC Universe Illustrated by Neal Adams Vol. 1 includes Our Army at War #182: "It's My Turn to Die" and Our Army at War #183: "Invisible Sniper" both by Howard Liss and Neal Adams; Our Army at War #186: "My Life for a Medal" by Hank Chapman and Adams; and Our Army at War #240: "Another Time Another Place" by Bob Haney and Adams, 192 pages, January 2009, ISBN 1-4012-1917-9
- U.S.S. Stevens: The Collected Stories includes "U.S.S. Stevens" stories from Our Army at War #218, 220, 222–223, 225, 227, 230–232, 235, 238, 240–242, 244–245, 247–248, 256–259, 261–262, 265–267, 269, 275, 281–282, 284, 293, 298, 424 pages, July 2016, ISBN 978-0486801582
