= Robert Kanigher =

American comic books editor (1915–2002)

- Born: Robert Kanigher; June 18, 1915 New York City, U.S.
- Died: May 7, 2002 (aged 86) Fishkill, New York, U.S.
- Areas: Writer, Editor
- Pseudonyms: Bart Regan; Dion Anthony; Jan Laurie; Robert Starr; Jed Corby
- Notable works: All-American Men of War; The Flash; G.I. Combat; Metal Men; Our Army at War; Our Fighting Forces; Sgt. Rock; Star Spangled War Stories; Wonder Woman

Robert Kanigher (/ˈkænɪɡər/; June 18, 1915 – May 7, 2002) was an American comic book writer and editor whose career spanned five decades. He was involved with the Wonder Woman franchise for over twenty years, taking over the scripting from creator William Moulton Marston. In addition, Kanigher spent many years in charge of National Periodical Publications's war titles and created the character Sgt. Rock. Kanigher scripted what is considered the first Silver Age comic book story, "Mystery of the Human Thunderbolt!", which introduced the Barry Allen version of the Flash in Showcase #4 (Oct. 1956).

== Early life ==
Kanigher was born in New York City, the third of Ephraim and Rebecca (née Herman) Kanigher's three children. Kanigher's parents were Romanian Jewish immigrants.

Kanigher started working part-time when 12 years old to help support his family. "My father was destroyed in the Great Depression". He quickly started working full-time. "I supported them in their own flat (without their asking me), paying for everything from chewing gum to (their) coffins, 28 years later".

== Career ==
=== Early work ===
Kanigher's career as a writer started early, with his short stories and poetry being published in magazines. He won The New York Times Collegiate Short Story Contest in 1932. In the late 1930s and early 1940s, Kanigher also wrote for radio, film, and authored several plays.

In 1943 Kanigher wrote How to Make Money Writing, which included a section on comics, making it one of the earliest works on the subject.

== Comic books ==
=== The Golden Age ===
Kanigher's earliest comics work was in such titles as Fox Feature Syndicate's Blue Beetle (where he created the Bouncer), MLJ/Archie Comics's Steel Sterling and The Web, and Fawcett Comics Captain Marvel Adventures.

Kanigher joined All-American Comics, a precursor of the future DC Comics, as a scripter in 1945, and was quickly promoted to editor. He wrote the "Justice Society of America" feature in All Star Comics, the "Hawkman" feature in Flash Comics, and Green Lantern. Kanigher edited Wonder Woman starting in 1948 to issue #176 (May–June 1968). A year after Wonder Woman creator William Moulton Marston died in 1947, Kanigher became the title's writer as well. Kanigher wrote "The Black Canary", a six-page Johnny Thunder story which introduced the Black Canary character in Flash Comics #86 (August 1947). This was also artist Carmine Infantino's first published work for DC. Other new characters created by Kanigher during this time included Rose and Thorn and the Harlequin.

Starting in 1952, Kanigher began editing and writing the "big five" DC Comics' war titles: G.I. Combat, Our Army at War, Our Fighting Forces, All-American Men of War, and Star Spangled War Stories. His creation of Sgt. Rock with Joe Kubert is considered one of his most memorable contributions to the medium. Comics historian Bill Schelly noted that "Kanigher's scripts were built on well-orchestrated dramatic sequences, with the story's objects not war-time danger and violence, but the impact these events had on the men of Easy Company."

=== The Silver Age ===
In 1956, DC editor Julius Schwartz assigned Kanigher and Infantino to the company's first attempt at reviving superheroes: an updated version of the Flash that would appear in issue #4 (Oct. 1956) of the try-out series Showcase. The eventual success of the new, science-fiction-oriented Flash heralded the wholesale return of superheroes, and the beginning of what fans and historians call the Silver Age of comics.

Artist Ross Andru began a nine-year run on Wonder Woman, starting with issue #98 (May 1958), where he and Kanigher reinvented the character, introducing the Silver Age version and her supporting cast.

Kanigher and Andru had several other notable collaborations. The "Gunner and Sarge" feature introduced in All-American Men of War #67 (March 1959) was one of the first war comics to feature recurring characters. Andru drew an early appearance of Kanigher's Sgt. Rock character in Our Army at War #81 (April 1959) The creative team co-created the original version of the Suicide Squad in The Brave and the Bold #25 (September 1959). Another innovation was the melding of war comics with science-fiction in "The War that Time Forgot", a feature created by Kanigher and Andru in Star Spangled War Stories #90 (May 1960). The Kanigher-Andru pairing co-created the Metal Men in Showcase #37 (March–April 1962).

Kanigher also created other popular action series features, such as "Enemy Ace", "The Losers", and The Unknown Soldier. He and artist Russ Heath created the "Haunted Tank" feature and the Sea Devils series. Several of Kanigher's characters were combined into a single feature titled "The Losers". Their first appearance as a group was with the Haunted Tank crew in G.I. Combat #138 (Oct.–Nov. 1969). In the late 1950s and 1960s, Kanigher had a hand in creating many other characters, including the Viking Prince, Balloon Buster, and the Batman villain Poison Ivy.

Among fellow comic creators, Kanigher was as well known for his unstable personality and violent temper as he was for his brilliance as a writer, and collaborators such as Gene Colan and John Romita Sr. have commented on the difficulty of working with him. Romita recounted:

I worked on a series with Kanigher — he wrote two series for me in the romance dept. One about an airline stewardess, and one about a nurse. He used to compliment me whenever he'd see me in the bullpen. "Like the stuff ... like the stuff ..." That was about the amount of conversation we had. Then one day we were in the elevator together, and he said, "Like the stuff." I, like an innocent fool ... I used to do some adjustments to his pages. If he had a heavy-copy panel, I might take a balloon from one panel and put it in the next. Just because I was distributing space. I was so stupid and naive, I said to him, "It doesn't bother you, does it, that I sometimes switch some of the panels around and move some of the balloons from one panel to another?" He started to chew me out in the elevator! "Who the hell do you think you are, changing my stuff? Where do you come off changing my stuff? You don't know anything about this business!"

=== The Bronze Age ===
Reuniting with Andru, Kanigher co-created the "Rose & The Thorn" backup feature in Superman's Girl Friend, Lois Lane #105 (October 1970). Kanigher wrote two stories for Marvel Comics: "Weep for a Lost Nightmare" in Iron Man #44 (Jan. 1972) and "Running for Love" in Our Love Story #19 (Oct. 1972). Kanigher returned as writer-editor of the Wonder Woman title with issue #204 (Jan.–Feb. 1973) and restored the character's powers and traditional costume. In 1974, drawing on a classic novel, he introduced Rima the Jungle Girl to the DC Universe in her own title. Kanigher and Kubert created Ragman in the first issue (Aug.–Sept. 1976) of that character's short-lived ongoing series.

Around 1977, Kanigher taught for a year at the Joe Kubert School of Cartoon and Graphic Art.

Kanigher was still working for DC into the early 1980s, most notably on the Creature Commandos feature in Weird War Tales. When told the comic was being canceled, Kanigher wrote a one-page Creature Commandos story where the team of military superhumans and himself were rocketed off into space. In 1986, he returned at Marvel to write Death is a Dutchman! in Savage Tales #7 (Oct. 1986).

== Tributes and awards ==
In 1985, DC Comics named Kanigher as one of the honorees in the company's 50th anniversary publication Fifty Who Made DC Great.

Streets and buildings have been named in his honor in several of DC Comics' fictional cities, including Central City and Keystone City. The hometown of Nate Banks in the comic book themed kids' series of novels, The Amazing Adventures of Nate Banks, is named Kanigher Falls.

In 2014, Kanigher was posthumously recognized with the Bill Finger Award.

== Publications ==
- Kanigher, Robert (1943). Where And How to Sell Your Manuscripts. New York: Cambridge House.
- Kanigher, Robert (1943). How to Make Money Writing for Comics Magazines. New York: Cambridge House.
- Kanigher, Robert (1943). How to Make Money Writing for Radio. New York: Cambridge House.
- Kanigher, Robert (1943). How to Make Money Writing for the Stage. New York: Cambridge House.

== Bibliography ==
=== Archie Comics ===
- Blue Ribbon Comics #3 (1983)
- Lancelot Strong, the Shield #2 (1983)
- Shield – Steel Sterling #3 (1983)
- Steel Sterling #4–7 (1984)
- Zip Comics #25 (1942)

=== DC Comics ===
- 1st Issue Special #4 (1975)
- Action Comics #391–392 (1970)
- Adventure Comics #383, 386, 389, 391–396, 399, 425–426 (1969–1973)
- Adventures of Rex, the Wonder Dog#3–27, 30, 33, 35, 37, 39–44 (1952–1959)
- All American Men of War #41–50, 52–64, 66–87, 89–93 (1957–1962)
- All Out War #1 (1979)
- All Star Western #60–64, 67–75, 80–98, 100–116 (1951–1960)
- All-American Comics 89–96, 98, 100–102 (1947–1948)
- All-American Men of War #1–40, 94–117 (1952–1966)
- All-American Western #103–126 (1948–1952)
- All-Flash #24–32 (1946–1947)
- All-Out War #2–6 (1979–1980)
- All-Star Comics #36–38 (1947)
- All-Star Western #2–5, 7, 10 (1970–1972)
- Arak, Son of Thunder #8–11 (1982)
- Atom & Hawkman #39, 43–44 (1968–1969)
- Batman #178–181, 183, 229 (1966–1971)
- Batman Gotham Knights (Batman Black and White) #11 (2001)
- Big Town #4, 13 (1951–1952)
- Blitzkrieg #1–5 (1976)
- The Brave and the Bold #1–22, 24–27, 37–39, 52, 188–189, 196 (1955–1983)
- Capt. Storm #1–18 (1964–1967)
- Challengers of the Unknown #64–65, 67 (1968–1969)
- Comic Cavalcade #20–29 (1947–1948)
- Danger Trail #1–5 (1950–1951)
- DC 100 Page Super Spectacular #5–6 (1971)
- DC Special #3 (1969)
- DC Special Series #3, 13, 21–22 (1978–1980)
- DC Super-Stars #15 (1977)
- Detective Comics #348, 350, 385 (1966–1969)
- Elvira's House of Mystery 1–3, 5–6, 10 (1986)
- Falling in Love #57, 59, 130, 139–141 (1963–1973)
- Flash #161, 192, 195, 197–204, 206, 208, 214 (1966–1972)
- Flash Comics #81–104 (1947–1949)
- G.I. Combat #44–46, 48–57, 59–60, 62–65, 67–71, 73–75, 78–127, 129–139, 141–151, 153–158, 162, 165, 174–288 (1957–1987)
- Ghosts #60, 66, 76, 104–107, 112 (1978–1982)
- Girls' Love Stories #2–3, 27, 95, 97–98, 106–109, 111–113, 159, 170, 176–180 (1949–1973)
- Girls' Romances #91–94, 130, 160 (1963–1972)
- Green Lantern #29–38 (1947–1949)
- House of Mystery #181–183, 186–187, 189–190, 192, 203, 208, 214, 226, 228–229, 240, 249–250, 255–256, 277, 288 (1969–1981)
- House of Secrets #87, 137, 144–145, 151 (1970–1978)
- Justice League of America #84 (1970)
- Korak, Son of Tarzan #50, 52–57 (1973)
- Losers Special #1 (1985)
- Love Stories #150–152 (1973)
- Men of War #1–3, 8–10, 12–14, 19–20 (1977–1979)
- Metal Men #1–29, 33–36 (1963–1969)
- My Greatest Adventure #50 (1961)
- Mystery in Space #1–8 (1951–1952)
- Our Army at War #1–8, 10–12, 15–17, 19–29, 31–35, 37–47, 49–57, 59–64, 66–97, 99–163, 165–172, 174–176, 178–189, 191–193, 195, 197–202, 206–213, 215, 218, 220, 228, 231–233, 235–239, 241, 243, 245–301 (1952–1977)
- Our Fighting Forces #1-4, 6-15, 18-20, 22-24, 26-28, 30-31, 33-34, 37-38, 40-43, 45-150, 163-181 (1954–1978)
- Phantom Stranger vol.2 #4–5, 7, 12–13, 15, 20 (1969–1972)
- Ragman #1–5 (1976–1977)
- Rex the Wonder Dog #1–2 (1952)
- Rima, the Jungle Girl #2–7 (1974–1975)
- Romance Trail #1, 6 (1949–1950)
- Sea Devils #1, 3–11 (1961–1963)
- Secret Hearts #101–106, 143–144, 146 (1965–1970)
- Secrets of Haunted House #1–2, 19, 45 (1975–1982)
- Secrets of Sinister House #6, 9, 11 (1972–1973)
- Sensation Comics #41–42, 44–45, 48–49, 51, 58, 60–63, 65, 71, 77–80, 83–107, 109–116 (1945–1953)
- Sgt. Rock #302–317, 319–394, 397–403, 405–422, Annual #2–4 (1977–1988)
- Sgt. Rock Special #1 (1992)
- Showcase #2–4, 8, 13–14, 27, 29, 37–40, 45, 50, 57–58, 104 (1956–1978)
- Star Spangled War Stories #21–26, 28–29, 31–51, 53–55, 57–61, 63, 66, 68–69, 72–76, 78–80, 82–92, 94–95, 97–128, 130, 132–145, 147–149, 164, 173, 181–183, 204 (1954–1977)
- Strange Adventures #214 (1968)
- Supergirl #6 (1973)
- Superman #216, 224 (1969–1970)
- Superman's Girlfriend Lois Lane #93, 98–100, 102–103, 105–112, 114–121, 123, 125–126, 130, 132 (1969–1973)
- Tarzan #230–234 (1974)
- Tarzan Family #60–65 (1975–1976)
- Teen Titans #25–27 (1970)
- Tomahawk #119–140 (1968–1972)
- Unexpected #127, 218, 222 (1971–1982)
- Unknown Soldier #209–210, 214, 216, 220, 227, 243–247, 249, 251–253, 257–267 (1977–1982)
- Weird Mystery Tales #8–9, 17–20, 22 (1973–1975)
- Weird War Tales #2, 8–9, 12, 17, 29, 31, 34, 36, 52, 54, 59, 61, 80, 87, 89, 94–96, 98–99, 101, 103, 105–106, 108–124 (1971–1983)
- Wonder Woman #29–176, 204–205, 207–211, 286 (1948-1981)
- World's Finest Comics #64, 185–187 (1953–1969)
- Young Love #60, 81, 104, 123–124 (1967–1977)
- Young Romance #126–127, 129, 131–133, 163, 171, 194–195 (1963–1973)

=== Fawcett Comics ===
- Captain Marvel Adventures #29 (1943)

=== Fox Comics ===
- All Good Comcis (1944)
- All Your Comics (1944)
- Big 3 #3–4 (1941)
- Blue Beetle #35, 38 (1944–1945)
- Book of All-Comics (1945)
- The Bouncer #11–14 (1944–1945)
- Everybody's Comics (1944)
- Fantastic Comics #15, 20 (1941)
- Mystery Men Comics #30 (1942)

=== Marvel Comics ===
- Iron Man #44 (1972)
- Our Love Story #19 (1972)
- Savage Tales vol. 2 #7 (1986)

=== Skywald ===
- Heap #1 (1971)
- Nightmare #6 (1971)
- Psycho Annual #1 (1972)

| Preceded by William Moulton Marston | Wonder Woman writer 1947–1968 | Succeeded by Dennis O'Neil |
| Preceded by n/a | The Brave and the Bold writer 1955–1961 | Succeeded by Bob Haney |
| Preceded by Bob Haney | All-American Men of War writer 1959–1966 | Succeeded by Bob Haney |
| Preceded by John Broome | The Flash writer 1969–1971 | Succeeded by Cary Bates |
| Preceded by Cary Bates | Superman's Girl Friend, Lois Lane writer 1970–1972 | Succeeded by Cary Bates |
| Preceded by Bob Haney | Teen Titans writer 1970 | Succeeded by Steve Skeates |
| Preceded by Dennis O'Neil | Justice League of America writer 1970 | Succeeded by Mike Friedrich |
