= Sgt. Rock =

Character from DC Comics

- Sgt. Rock as depicted in The Brave and the Bold #200 (July 1983). Art by Joe Kubert.

Publication information
- Publisher: DC Comics
- First appearance: Our Army at War #83 (June 1959)
- Created by: Robert Kanigher (writer); Joe Kubert (artist)

In-story information
- Full name: Franklin John Rock
- Species: Human
- Place of origin: Earth
- Team affiliations: United States Army; Easy Company; Suicide Squad; Creature Commandos
- Abilities: Trained marksman and U.S. military combatant

Sergeant Franklin John Rock, also known as simply Sgt. Rock, is a fictional character appearing in American comic books published by DC Comics. Sgt. Rock first appeared in Our Army at War #83 (June 1959), and was created by Robert Kanigher and Joe Kubert. The character is a World War II soldier who served as an infantry non-commissioned officer.

== Publication history ==
Sgt. Rock's debut in Our Army at War #83 (June 1959). Cover by Joe Kubert.

Sgt. Rock's prototype first appeared in G.I. Combat #68 (January 1959). His rank is not given in this story; instead, he is merely called "The Rock". The Rock returned as a sergeant in Our Army at War #81 (April 1959) named "Sgt. Rocky" with his unit, Easy Company (the precise US Army infantry regiment to which Easy belonged was never identified during the history of the character). This second prototype story was written by Bob Haney, but the character's creator, Robert Kanigher, was the editor. Kanigher would go on to create the bulk of the stories with Joe Kubert as the artist. In issue #82 (May 1959), he is called "Sgt. Rock" (name only) and by issue #83 (June 1959), he makes his first full appearance as Sgt. Rock.

Our Army at War steadily gained popularity, until, in 1977, the name of the comic was changed to Sgt. Rock. The comic ran until Sgt. Rock #422 (July 1988). In addition to the semi-regular comic, several "digests" were sold, under the DC Special Blue Ribbon Digest banner, reprinting stories from Our Army at War or Sgt. Rock. Some were subtitled as OAAW or Sgt. Rock, some as Sgt. Rock's Prize Battle Tales (the Prize Battle Tales title was also used on earlier 80-page annual specials). The digest format was 4 13/16" × 6 5/8", softcover, with 98 full-color pages and no advertisements.

A 21-issue run of reprints followed from 1988 to 1991, and two Sgt. Rock Specials with new content saw publication in 1992 and 1994. A Christmas-themed story appeared in DCU Holiday Bash II in 1997, again featuring new content.

According to John Wells, in Fanzing 36 (July 2001), an online fan magazine:

Sgt. Rock's complex family tree comes by way of creator Robert Kanigher, who added new (and often conflicting) branches throughout the character's original 29 year run. Rock's father was variously described as having died in a mine cave-in (OAAW #231), in World War I (#275 and 419) or in a Pittsburgh steel mill (#347). Robin Snyder (in a letter mistakenly attributed in #353 to Mike Tiefenbacher) suggested that one of the deaths occurred to Rock's stepfather and his existence was confirmed in #400. As things currently stand, it was father John Rock who died in combat and stepfather John Anderson who perished in a cave-in. The third death, as theorized above, probably occurred to a father figure that Frank Rock worked with at the steel mill.

In at least one Sgt. Rock comic book published in the late 1960s, it was revealed that Sgt. Rock had a brother who was an infantry officer in the U.S. Marine Corps, fighting in the Pacific Theater. In this episode, Sgt. Rock told his fellow soldiers about a weird combat incident that his brother had taken part in on a Pacific island, shown in the comic in a "flashback" style. Larry Rock became an aide to general Douglas MacArthur and was kidnapped by the Nazis and tortured for information on the planned re-taking of the Philippines. Sgt. Rock attempted to rescue him but Larry was presumed dead when he fell from a mountain cable car (Sgt. Rock Annual #2). One of the last Kanigher Sgt. Rock issues showed Larry living as a peaceful amnesiac in neutral Switzerland. Rock never reported his survival, figuring Larry had earned his peace.

A Viet Nam soldier by the name of Adam Rock appears in Swamp Thing #16 (May 1975), though it is never specifically stated if he is intended to be a relative of Frank Rock.

DC Comics published Sgt. Rock: The Lost Battalion, written and drawn by William Tucci, starting in November 2008. The story places Rock and Easy Company with the 1st Battalion, 141st Infantry, which was surrounded by German forces in the Vosges Mountains on October 24, 1944, and eventually rescued by the Japanese-American 442nd Regimental Combat Team.

The Lost Battalion also revives other World War II–era DC characters, such as the Haunted Tank, and "Navajo Ace" Johnny Cloud, and the story itself is mainly narrated by combat journalist William J. Kilroy, and German General Friedrich Wiese.

== Fictional character biography ==
During World War II, Sgt. Rock fought in the infantry branch of the U.S. Army in the European Theatre and eventually rose to authority within his unit, Easy Company. The unit was a collection of disparate individuals who managed to participate in every major action in the European war. Rock's dog-tag number was 409966, which had been, it was claimed, Robert Kanigher's own military serial number.

Robert Kanigher mused in letters columns in the 1970s and 1980s that Rock probably belonged to "The Big Red One" (First US Infantry Division) given his appearance on battlefields in North Africa, Italy, and Northwest Europe. Rock's backstory was fleshed out in different comics over the years; generally he is considered to have come from Pittsburgh, Pennsylvania, where he worked in a steel mill. Enlisting after the attack on Pearl Harbor, he went to North Africa as a private but promotion came quickly as his superiors were killed, to assistant squad leader, squad leader, and then platoon sergeant. During the main series, his unit is only ever given as "Easy Company", but no regiment or division is named nor is unit insignia ever shown. Rock is shown to have two siblings (Sgt. Rock #421): Larry, a Marine fighting in the Pacific and Amy, a nun.

In the 2003 graphic novel Sgt. Rock: Between Hell & A Hard Place, "Easy Company" is mentioned as being part of the 22nd Infantry Regiment, 4th Infantry Division, during the Battle of Hürtgen Forest.

In the 2009 six-issue miniseries Sgt. Rock: The Lost Battalion Rock's unit is still referred to as "Easy Company" but is of the 141st Infantry Regiment. However, in the closing pages of the last issue, the narration states that, following the end of the story, "as usual, Sgt. Rock's 'Combat-Happy Joes' moved out to fill the ranks of another Easy Company left fractured by war", moving them to the 15th Infantry Regiment, 3rd Division, under 2nd Lieutenant Audie Murphy. A famous tagline of Rock's is: "Nothin's easy in Easy Company".

Rock also usually wears the chevrons and rockers of a Master Sergeant on his uniform and also applied, oversize, to the front of his helmet.

=== Fate ===
The ultimate fate of Sgt. Frank Rock is complicated. There were initially two versions of the character, one residing on Earth-One and the other residing on Earth-Two. According to a number of stories, he was killed on the last day of the war by the last enemy bullet fired. However, DC has also published a number of stories that depict Rock as surviving into the modern age of superheroes, including appearances alongside Batman, Superman, and the Suicide Squad. Following this, Rock appeared as a general and a chief of staff for Lex Luthor's presidential administration.

Robert Kanigher planned a conclusion to Rock's wartime adventures, which went uncompleted before Kanigher's death in 2002. Len Wein and Joe Kubert's 2010 back-up story "Snapshot: Remembrance" from the retrospective miniseries DC Universe: Legacies reveals that Sgt. Rock did die at the close of WWII. Flashbacks illustrate Rock being killed on the last day of the war in Europe while protecting a child who had wandered into crossfire.

== Powers and abilities ==
Rock is a crack shot, able to shoot down several German fighter planes with a single submachine gun, and able to throw hand grenades with amazing accuracy. Rock is a highly effective close combat fighter, mostly shown using a style of street fighting mixed with boxing and judo. Rock seems to have close to superhuman endurance and strength, surviving a large number of gunshot wounds, fragments from hand grenades, exposure to freezing water and other hazards. Rock's level of endurance is downplayed in Robert Kanigher's stories. Rock's "Combat Antenna" is what he calls a kind of sixth sense to warn him of impending enemy attack. This usually allows him at least some time to warn Easy Co. even if it rarely allows them to get out of harm's way entirely. With very few exceptions, Rock maintains complete calm and determination under fire, even when the odds are stacked high against his and Easy Co.'s success.

== Equipment ==
The classic Rock was usually dressed in olive drab fatigues, with a .45-caliber M1A1 Thompson submachine gun (although sometimes he is shown using an M50 Reising instead) and .45-caliber Colt M1911A1 semi-automatic pistol as his armament. Oddly, the classic artwork almost always depicts Rock with an M1 Garand cartridge belt which would be useless to him, as well as two belts of .50-caliber ammunition (drawn as .30 caliber fabric belted for M1917 Browning machine gun), which Rock considers lucky charms. Artists John Severin and Russ Heath sometimes attempted a more realistic portrayal of Rock's equipment, but the .50-caliber ammunition remained a personal trademark. Rock is always shown with a number of hand grenades secured to his equipment.

== Other versions ==
An alternate universe version of Sgt. Rock appears in Flashpoint. This version is a member of Team 7 before being killed during an attack on a terrorist camp.

== Reception ==
Sgt. Rock was ranked as the 183rd-greatest comic book character of all time by Wizard magazine. IGN also listed Sgt. Rock as the 78th-greatest comic book hero of all time, stating that Rock represents the epitome of DC's often overlooked World War II comics.

== In other media ==
=== Television ===
- Sgt. Rock appears in the Justice League three-part episode "The Savage Time", voiced by Fred Dryer.
- Sgt. Rock appears in the teaser for the Batman: The Brave and the Bold episode "The Plague of the Prototypes!", voiced by Fred Tatasciore.
- A soldier implied to be Sgt. Rock appears in the Legends of Tomorrow episode "Legendary", portrayed by Blair Penner. Series co-executive producer Marc Guggenheim said that Rock was intended to appear later in the series, though this never came to pass.

=== Film ===
- In the late 1980s and early 1990s, Arnold Schwarzenegger was attached to play Sgt. Rock in a film produced by Joel Silver, with screenplays written by David Peoples (1987), Steven E. de Souza (1988), John Milius (1993), and Brian Helgeland (1996) depicting Rock as German-American because of Schwarzenegger's heritage before John Cox wrote a new screenplay unrelated to the previous drafts. Other writers attached also included Jeffrey Boam, Danny Bilson and Paul De Meo. Eventually, Cox stated that Schwarzenegger was no longer attached to star in the project. In April 2007, David Gambino, VP of Silver Pictures said, "The good news is we have a fantastic screenplay and everybody's really happy with it. It's really just about trying to attach cast right now and really decide what the movie is going to be, how we're going to make it". Bruce Willis was reportedly in consideration for the role and Guy Ritchie rumored to direct. However, in December 2008, Ritchie said that while the film was shelved due to his work on Sherlock Holmes and budget issues, he mentioned that he had an actor in mind for the role and confirmed that the Sgt. Rock film would be set during World War II and include the Easy Company. In November 2009, it was announced that the film would be written by Chad St. John and directed by Francis Lawrence and produced by Joel Silver and Akiva Goldsman for Warner Bros as well as Andrew Rona and Kerry Foster. However, the project's setting would be shifted to the near future due to box office problems for World War II films and the negative image of the ongoing war on terror. The film's draft was finished in late January 2010.
- Sgt. Rock appears in DC Showcase: Sgt. Rock, voiced by Karl Urban.
- Sgt. Rock makes a non-speaking appearance in Justice League: Crisis on Infinite Earths – Part Three.

=== DC Universe ===
Sgt. Rock appears in media set in the DC Universe (DCU).

- Sgt. Rock appears in a flashback in the Creature Commandos episode "Cheers to the Tin Man", voiced by Maury Sterling.
- On September 3, 2024, it was reported that Luca Guadagnino was attached to direct a Sgt. Rock film, with Justin Kuritzkes writing. On November 19, 2024, it was announced that the studio and Guadagnino were seeking Daniel Craig to play the titular role. In February 2025, Craig was reported to never have been attached to the film and Colin Farrell entered talks to star as Rock by mid-March 2025. Filming was expected to begin in late 2025. However, on April 30, 2025, the film was revealed to have halted production with the intention of starting in the summer of 2026 instead. While the film was still in development, previous Guadagnino collaborators Mike Faist and Taylor Russell were approached to potentially star in supporting roles, as well as Mikey Madison.

=== Video games ===
- Activision confirmed at E3 1997 that they were developing a Sgt. Rock game for the PlayStation, set for release in 1998, but the game was never mentioned again.
- Sgt. Rock appears in Sgt. Rock: On the Frontline for the Game Boy Color.
- Sgt. Rock appears in DC Universe Online.
- Sgt. Rock appears as a character summon in Scribblenauts Unmasked: A DC Comics Adventure.

== Merchandise and collectibles ==

- A line of 3 3/4" action figures bearing the Sgt. Rock name was released in the 1980s by Remco Toys, likely as a result of the popularity of Hasbro's G.I. Joe toy line. The figures had little resemblance to the World War II characters of the comic books. The Sgt. Rock figure was depicted in Vietnam-era fatigues and gear and had an M16 rifle instead of a Thompson submachine gun. Other generic figures were sold, with no other characters recognizable from the comics. These US troops also had Vietnam-era equipment and helmets/helmet covers or berets, and were collectively referred to as "Tough Action Soldiers". "Enemy" soldiers were simply toys produced from the same molds used to make the US soldiers, painted black with blue helmets. Each figure came with a plastic dog tag on which purchasers could ink their name and rank. A serial number was printed on a paper sticker affixed to the plastic tag, which also came with a silver-colored string to suspend the tag around the neck. Playsets included plastic machine gun and mortar bunkers. The quality of these toys was very low; soft plastic was used, and joints had limited movement, especially compared to the G.I. Joe line of 3 3/4" action figures.
- There was also a range of diecast metal vehicles, produced by Universal Toys for Azrak-Hamway of New York. These were packaged on cards similar to the Remco Action Figures. The range included two tanks, a Jeep, a staff car and an ambulance.

- In 2002, a limited edition of 12" Sgt. Rock figures was released by Hasbro, as part of the 12" G.I. Joe line, including four other characters from the comic book series; Bulldozer, Little Sure Shot, Jackie Johnson and Wildman. The figures wore World War II-era fatigues and mostly carried the same weapons as in the comic books (though the Bulldozer figure carries an M-1 rifle instead of an air-cooled Browning .30-calibre machine gun). A female figure was also released, portraying French Resistance fighter Mademoiselle Marie, Sgt. Rock's only love interest during the comic book series. A number of playsets were also produced by Dreams and Visions in 2003.
- Sgt. Rock received a figure in the HeroClix line as part of the "Cosmic Justice" expansion. Additionally, a limited edition tournament prize figure of "General Frank Rock" was released as well.

== Collected editions ==
The series has been collected into a number of trade paperbacks:

Title	Material collected	Pages	ISBN
Sgt. Rock Archives Volume 1	Our Army at War #81–96, G.I. Combat #68	228	1-56389-841-1
Sgt. Rock Archives Volume 2	Our Army at War #97–110	207	1-4012-0146-6
Sgt. Rock Archives Volume 3	Our Army at War #111–125	228	1-4012-0410-4
Sgt. Rock Archives Volume 4	Our Army at War #126–137, Showcase #45	246	978-1-4012-3726-4
Sgt. Rock's Combat Tales Volume 1	Star Spangled War Stories #72, G.I. Combat #56, 68, Our Army at War #83–84, 87–90	128	1-4012-0794-4
Showcase Presents: Sgt. Rock Volume 1	G.I. Combat #68, Our Army at War #81–117	544	978-1-4012-1713-6
Showcase Presents: Sgt. Rock Volume 2	Our Army at War #118–148	520	978-1-4012-1984-0
Showcase Presents: Sgt. Rock Volume 3	Our Army at War #149–163, 165–172 and 174–180	496	978-1-4012-2771-5
Showcase Presents: Sgt. Rock Volume 4	Our Army at War #181–216	544	978-1-4012-3811-7
Sgt. Rock: The Prophecy	Sgt. Rock: The Prophecy #1–6	144	978-1-4012-1248-3
Sgt. Rock: Between Hell and a Hard Place	Sgt. Rock: Between Hell and a Hard Place #1–6	144	1-4012-0054-0
Sgt. Rock: The Lost Battalion	Sgt. Rock: The Lost Battalion #1–6	160	978-1-4012-2533-9
DC Through the 80s: The End of Eras	Sgt. Rock #345, 347, 368, 387	520	978-1779500878

== See also ==
- Sergeant York
- Nick Fury
