= Joe Kubert =

Polish-American comic book artist (1926–2012)

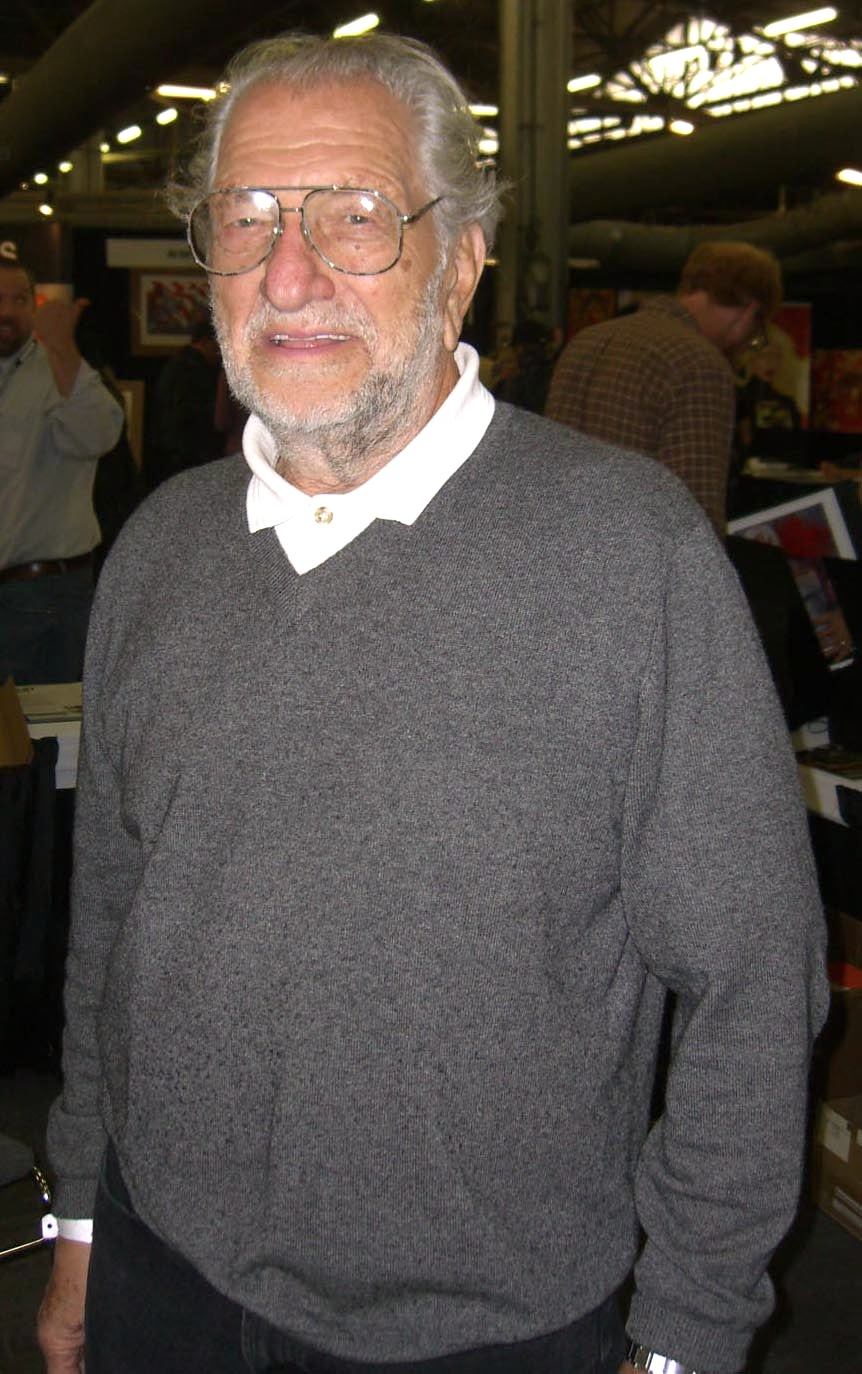
- Kubert in 2009
- Born: September 18, 1926 Jezierzany, Poland (now Ozeriany, Ternopil Region, Ukraine)
- Died: August 12, 2012 (aged 85) Morristown, New Jersey, U.S.
- Areas: Writer, Artist
- Notable works: Fax From Sarajevo; Sgt. Rock; Hawkman; The Punisher: War Zone; Tarzan; Yossel: April 19, 1943
- Awards: Alley Award (1962, 1963, 1969); National Cartoonists Society Awards (1974, 1980); Eisner Award (1977); Harvey Award (1997); Inkwell Awards Joe Sinnott Hall of Fame (2015).
- Spouse: Muriel Fogelson (1951–2008)
- Children: 5

Joseph Kubert (/ˈkjuːbərt/; September 18, 1926 – August 12, 2012) was a Polish-born American comic book artist, art teacher, and founder of The Kubert School. He is best known for his work on the DC Comics characters Sgt. Rock and Hawkman. He is also known for working on his own creations, such as Tor, Son of Sinbad, and the Viking Prince, and, with writer Robin Moore, the comic strip Tales of the Green Beret.

Two of Kubert's sons, Andy Kubert and Adam Kubert, themselves became recognized comic book artists, as did Andy's daughter Emma Kubert, and many of Kubert's former students, including Stephen R. Bissette, Amanda Conner, Rick Veitch, Eric Shanower, Steve Lieber, and Scott Kolins. Kubert's other granddaughter, Katie Kubert, became an editor for both DC and Marvel Comics.

Kubert was inducted into the Harvey Awards' Jack Kirby Hall of Fame in 1997, and the Will Eisner Comic Book Hall of Fame in 1998.

== Early life ==
Kubert was born September 18, 1926 to a Jewish family in Jezierzany in southeast Poland (now Ozeriany in Ukraine). He was the son of Etta (née Reisenberg) and Jacob Kubert. He immigrated to Brooklyn, New York City, United States, at age two months with his parents and his two-and-a-half-year-old sister Ida. Raised in the East New York neighborhood, the son of a kosher butcher, Kubert started drawing at an early age, encouraged by his parents.

In his introduction to his graphic novel Yossel, Kubert wrote, "I got my first paying job as a cartoonist for comic books when I was eleven-and-a-half or twelve years old. Five dollars a page. In 1938, that was a lot of money". Another source, utilizing quotes from Kubert, says in 1938, a school friend who was related to Louis Silberkleit, a principal of MLJ Studios (the future Archie Comics), urged Kubert to visit the company, where he began an unofficial apprenticeship and at age 12 "was allowed to ink a rush job, the pencils of Bob Montana's [teen-humor feature] Archie". Author David Hajdu, who interviewed Kubert and other comics professionals for a 2008 book, reported, however, that, "Kubert has told varying versions of the story of his introduction to the comics business at age ten, sometimes setting it at the comics shop run by Harry "A" Chesler, sometimes at MLJ; however, MLJ did not start operation until 1939, when Kubert was thirteen".

Kubert attended Manhattan's High School of Music and Art. During this time he and classmate Norman Maurer, a future collaborator, would sometimes skip school in order to see publishers. Kubert began honing his craft at the Chesler studio, one of the comic-book packagers that had sprung up in the medium's early days to supply outsourced comics to publishers.

== Career ==
=== Early career ===
Kubert's first known professional job was penciling and inking the six-page story "Black-Out", starring the character Volton, in Holyoke Publishing's Catman Comics #8 (March 1942; also listed as vol. 2, #13). He would continue drawing the feature for the next three issues, and was soon doing similar work for Fox Comics' Blue Beetle. Branching into additional art skills, he began coloring the Quality Comics reprints of future industry legend Will Eisner's The Spirit, a seven-page comics feature that originally ran as part of a newspaper Sunday supplement.

=== 1940s and 1950s ===
Kubert's first work for DC Comics, where he would spend much of his career and produce some of his most notable art. Throughout the decade, Kubert's art would appear in comics from Fiction House, Avon, and Harvey Comics, but he worked primarily for All-American and DC. Kubert's long association with the Hawkman character began with the story "A Hot Time in the Old Town" in the one-shot publication The Big All-American Comic Book (1944). Kubert continued to draw Hawkman stories as a back-up feature in Flash Comics. He and Irwin Hasen drew the debut of the Injustice Society in All Star Comics #37 (Oct. 1947) in a tale written by Robert Kanigher. The Kanigher/Kubert team created the Thorn in Flash Comics #89 (Nov. 1947).

In the 1950s, he became managing editor of St. John Publications, where he, his old classmate Norman Maurer, and Norman's brother, Leonard Maurer, produced the first 3-D comic books, starting with Three Dimension Comics #1 (Sept. 1953 oversize format, Oct. 1953 standard-size reprint), featuring Mighty Mouse. According to Kubert, it sold a remarkable 1.2 million copies at 25 cents apiece at a time when comics cost a dime.

At St. John, writer Norman Maurer and artist Kubert created the enduring character Tor, a prehistoric-human protagonist who debuted in the comic 1,000,000 Years Ago (Sept. 1953). Tor immediately went on to star in 3-D Comics #2-3 (Oct.-Nov. 1953), followed by a titular, traditionally 2-D comic-book series, written and drawn by Joe Kubert, that premiered with issue #3 (May 1954). The character has since appeared in series from Eclipse Comics, Marvel Comics' Epic imprint, and DC Comics through at least the 1990s. Kubert in the late 1950s unsuccessfully attempted to sell Tor as a newspaper comic strip. The Tor samples consisted of 12 daily strips, reprinted in six pages in Alter Ego vol. 3 #10 and later expanded to 16 pages in DC Comics' Tor #1. He contributed work to Avon Periodicals, where he did science-fiction stories for Strange Worlds and other titles.

For EC Comics, Kubert drew a few stories for Harvey Kurtzman's Two-Fisted Tales alongside EC stalwarts Wally Wood, Jack Davis, and John Severin.

=== DC Comics and Sgt. Rock ===
Beginning with Our Army at War #32 (March 1955), Kubert began to freelance again for DC Comics, in addition to Lev Gleason Publications and Atlas Comics, the 1950s iteration of Marvel Comics. By the end of the year he was drawing for DC exclusively. DC editor Julius Schwartz assigned Kubert, Robert Kanigher, and Carmine Infantino to the company's first attempt at reviving superheroes: an updated version of the Flash that would appear in Showcase #4 (Oct. 1956). The eventual success of the new, science fiction-oriented Flash heralded the wholesale return of superheroes, and the beginning of what fans and historians call the Silver Age of Comic Books. In the coming years, Kubert would work on such characters as the medieval adventurer the Viking Prince and features starring Sgt. Rock and The Haunted Tank in the war comic G.I. Combat. He and writer Gardner Fox created a new version of Hawkman in The Brave and the Bold #34 (Feb.–March 1961) with the character receiving his own title three years later. Kubert's work on Hawkman and Sgt. Rock would become known as his signature efforts. Kubert's main collaborator on the war comics was writer/editor Kanigher. Their work together on Sgt. Rock is considered a memorable contribution to the comics medium. They introduced Enemy Ace in Our Army at War #151 (Feb. 1965).

From 1965 through 1967 he collaborated with author Robin Moore on the syndicated daily comic strip Tales of the Green Beret for the Chicago Tribune.

Kubert served as DC Comics' director of publications from 1967 to 1976. He made the Unknown Soldier the lead feature of Star Spangled War Stories with issue #151 (June–July 1970) and initiated titles based on such Edgar Rice Burroughs properties as Tarzan and Korak. Comics historian Les Daniels noted that Kubert's "scripts and artwork ranked among the most authentic and effective ever seen." DC Comics writer and executive Paul Levitz stated in 2010 that "Joe Kubert produced an adaptation that Burroughs aficionados could respect." Kubert edited a number of comic books for DC, including taking over as editor of Sgt. Rock and other military titles and editing Tarzan and other books based on Burroughs' characters. While performing supervisory duties he continued to draw for some books, notably Tarzan from 1972 to 1975 and drew covers and layouts for Rima the Jungle Girl from 1974 to 1975. He edited Limited Collectors' Edition #C–36 which features stories from the Book of Genesis adapted by writer Sheldon Mayer and artist Nestor Redondo. Kubert and Kanigher created Ragman in the first issue (Aug.–Sept. 1976) of that character's short-lived ongoing series.

=== The Kubert School ===
The Joe Kubert School of Cartoon and Graphic Art was founded in September 1976 by Kubert and his wife Muriel in Dover, New Jersey's old Baker mansion on 45 Lehigh Street; then, from 1984, in the former Dover high school, whose tall windows offered optimal lighting. Its first graduating class of 1978 included Stephen R. Bissette, Thomas Yeates, and Rick Veitch. Kubert taught a number of students who later became notable professionals, including Amanda Conner, Eric Shanower, Steve Lieber, and Scott Kolins.

In addition to The Kubert School, in the late 1990s, Kubert was offering "Joe Kubert's World of Cartooning" correspondence courses to prospective students.

=== Later career ===
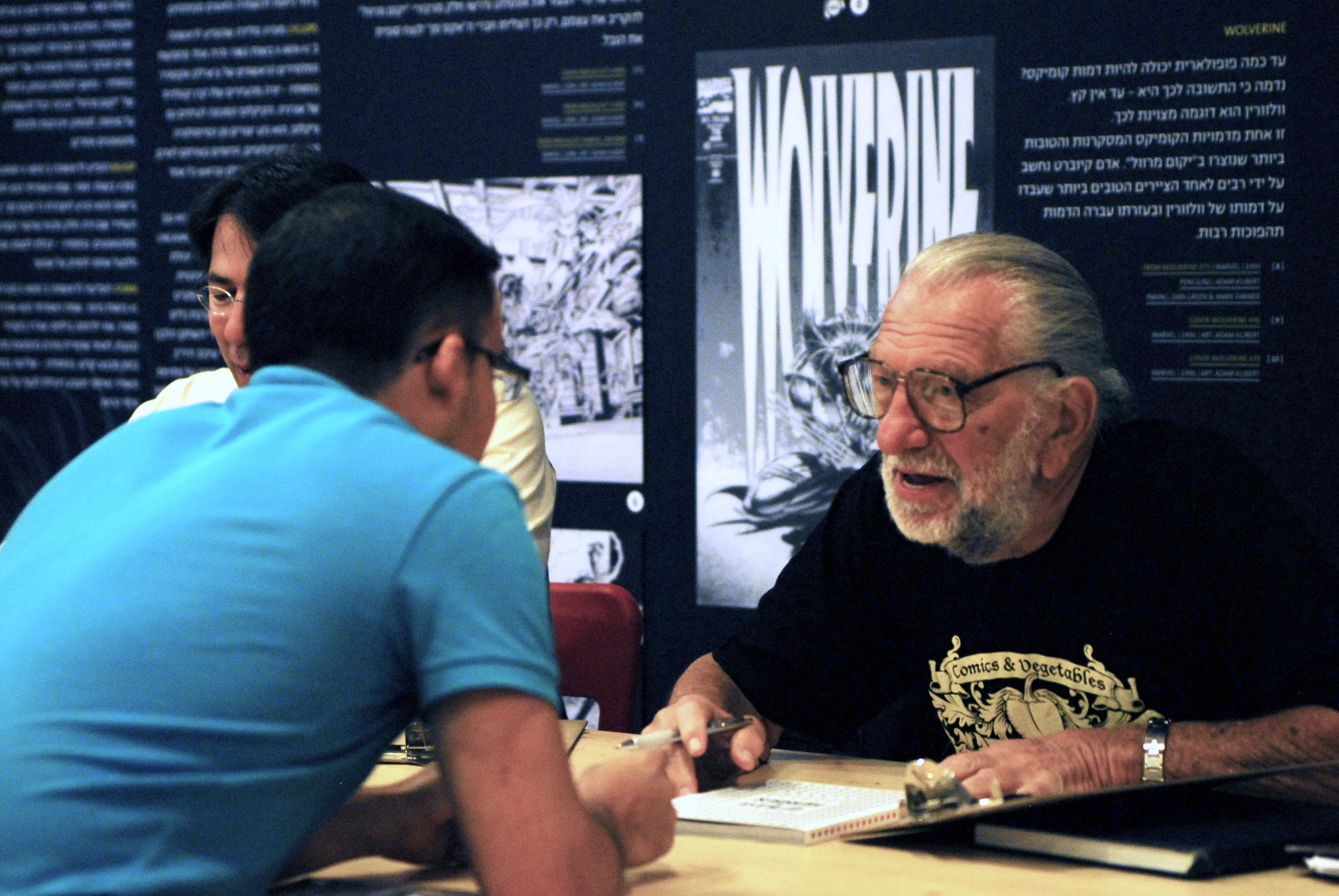
Joe Kubert at the Exhibition: Joe, Adam and Andy Kubert, Heroes, The Israeli Cartoon Museum, Holon, Israel, 2011

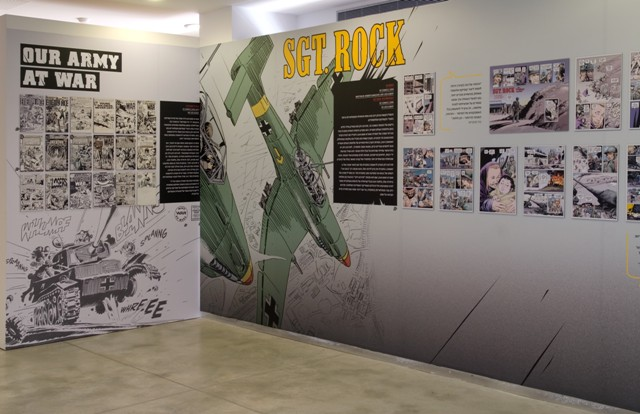
Joe, Adam and Andy Kubert, Heroes, The Israeli Cartoon Museum, Holon, Israel, 2011, Display View

Kubert provided art for several anniversary issues of key DC titles. He and writer Paul Levitz crafted a Hawkman story in Detective Comics #500 (March 1981). Kubert was one of the artists on the double-sized Justice League of America #200 (March 1982) as well as Batman #400 (Oct. 1986).

He wrote and drew a collection of faith-based comic strips beginning in the late 1980s for Tzivos Hashem, the Lubavitch children's organization, and Moshiach Times magazine. The stories, "The Adventures of Yaakov and Isaac", were based on biblical references but were not Bible stories.

Kubert made a return to writing and drawing in 1991 with the Abraham Stone graphic novel Country Mouse, City Rat for Malibu Comics' Platinum Editions. He returned to the character for two more stories, Radix Malorum and The Revolution published by Epic Comics in 1995.

Also for Epic Comics, he delivered the four-issue Tor miniseries in 1993. Fax from Sarajevo, initially released as a 207-page hardcover book in 1996 and two years later as a 224-page trade paperback was published by Dark Horse Comics. The non-fiction book originated as a series of faxes from European comics agent Ervin Rustemagić during the Serbian siege of Sarajevo. Rustemagić and his family, whose home and possessions in suburban Dobrinja were destroyed, spent two-and-a-half years in a ruined building, communicating with the outside world via fax when they could. Friend and client Kubert was one recipient. Collaborating long-distance, they collected Rustemagić's account of life during wartime, with Kubert and editor Bob Cooper turning the raw faxes into a somber comics tale.

Kubert drew the first issue of Stan Lee's Just Imagine... limited series (2001) and two pencil-illustrated graphic novels, Yossel: April 19, 1943 (2003) and Jew Gangster (2005), for IBooks. In 2003, Kubert returned to the Sgt. Rock character, illustrating Sgt. Rock: Between Hell and a Hard Place, a hardcover graphic novel written by Brian Azzarello. Kubert drew Tex, The Lonesome Rider, written by Claudio Nizzi and published by SAF Comics in 2005, and then wrote and drew Sgt. Rock: The Prophecy, a six-issue miniseries in 2006. In the mid-2000s, he was the artist for PS, The Preventive Maintenance Monthly, a United States Army magazine with comic-book elements that stresses the importance of preventive maintenance of vehicles, arms, and other ordnance. In 2008, Kubert returned to his Tor character with a six-issue limited series published by DC Comics entitled Tor: A Prehistoric Odyssey. In 2009, Kubert contributed a new Sgt. Rock story for Wednesday Comics, published by DC. His son, Adam, wrote the story, his first foray at scripting. In 2011, Joe Kubert wrote the introduction and drew the lenticular 3-D front cover for Craig Yoe's Amazing 3-D Comics! Kubert inked his son Andy's pencils on the first two issues of DC Universe: Legacies, a 10 issue series chronicling the history of the DC Universe. and the Before Watchmen: Nite Owl limited series. The first two issues of Before Watchmen: Nite Owl were released before Kubert's death. The other two were released posthumously. In 2012 Kubert and the Joe Kubert school produced a syndicated comic strip, "Hans Brinker and the Silver Skates", reprinted in Comics Revue. DC Comics published Joe Kubert Presents (Dec. 2012-May 2013) edited by Kubert and featuring stories by Kubert (Hawkman, Spit and The Redeemer), Sam Glanzman (U.S.S. Stevens), and Brian Buniak (Angel and the Ape).

== Personal life ==
Kubert married Muriel Fogelson on July 8, 1951. In the early 1960s, the Kuberts moved to Dover, New Jersey where they raised their five children: David, the eldest, followed by Danny, Lisa, and comic book artists Adam and Andy Kubert. Kubert's granddaughter Katie Kubert works as a comics editor. She worked at DC Comics for five years as an editor on the Batman titles, and left to work on the X-Men titles at Marvel Comics in June 2014. Kubert's grandson and graduate of The Kubert School, Orion Zangara, is also a comic-book artist who is currently working on a graphic novel trilogy for the Lerner Publishing Group. HIs granddaughter, Emma Kubert, is a comic book writer and artist.

=== Death ===
Kubert died of multiple myeloma on August 12, 2012, a month short of his 86th birthday. He was predeceased by his wife Muriel in 2008.

== Awards and recognition ==
Kubert's several awards and nominations include:

- the 1962 Alley Award for Best Single Comic Book Cover for The Brave and the Bold #42.
- a 1963 write-in Alley Award for "Artist Preferred on Sea Devils.
- a special 1969 Alley Award "for the cinematic storytelling techniques and the exciting and dramatic style he has brought to the field of comic art".
- The 1974 and 1980 National Cartoonists Society Awards in the category "Story Comic Book". plus a 1997 nomination for Best Comic Book.
- The 1977 Inkpot Award
- The 1997 Eisner Award for "Best Graphic Album: New", for Fax from Sarajevo.
- The 1997 Harvey Award for "Best Graphic Album of Original Work," for Fax from Sarajevo.
- September 2011 Inkwell Awards Ambassador (September 2011–August 2012)

Kubert was inducted into the Harvey Awards' Jack Kirby Hall of Fame in 1997, and Will Eisner Comic Book Hall of Fame in 1998. In 2009, Kubert received the Milton Caniff Lifetime Achievement Award from the National Cartoonists Society.

Kubert was awarded the Inkwell Awards Joe Sinnott Hall of Fame Award in 2015. His acceptance speech was given by Orion Zangara, his grandson and graduate of The Kubert School, on behalf of the Kubert Estate.

== Archive ==
Kubert's drafting table is on permanent exhibit in the Kubert Lounge and Gallery, which opened in September 2023 at the Cary Graphic Arts Collection in Rochester, NY. Adam Kubert donated his father's archive to the Cary Collection at his alma mater, the Rochester Institute of Technology, where archivists recreated Joe Kubert's work surface from photographs of his office at the Kubert School.

== Bibliography ==
=== DC Comics ===
- 9-11: The World's Finest Comic Book Writers & Artists Tell Stories to Remember, Volume Two (2002)
- Action Comics #66–69 (inks over Mort Meskin), 126–127, 136, 138, 141 (1943–1950)
- Action Comics Annual #10 (2007)
- All-American Comics #70 (1946)
- All-American Men of War #20, 22–24, 28–29, 33–34, 36–39, 41–43. 47–50, 52–53, 55–56, 59, 63–65, 69, 71, 73, 103, 114 (1955–1966)
- All-American Western #103–116, 121, 125 (1948–1952)
- All Star Comics #21, 24–30, 33–37, 56–57 (Justice Society of America) (1944–1951)
- Atom and Hawkman #40–41 (1968–1969)
- Batman #400 (1986)
- Batman Black and White #1 (1996)
- Before Watchmen: Nite Owl #1–3 (inks over Andy Kubert) (2012)
- Big All-American Comic Book #1 (1944)
- The Brave and the Bold #1–24 (Viking Prince); #34–36, 42–44 (Hawkman); #40 (Cave Carson); #52 (Sgt. Rock/Johnny Cloud/Haunted Tank) (1955–1964)
- Captain Storm #3, 6 (1964–1965)
- DC Comics Presents #66 (Superman and the Demon) (1984)
- DC Special #5 (1969)
- DC Universe: Last Will and Testament #1 (inks over Adam Kubert) (2008)
- DC Universe: Legacies #1–2 (inks over Andy Kubert), #4 (2010)
- Detective Comics #500 (Hawkman backup story) (1981)
- Dong Xoai, Vietnam 1965 HC (2010)
- Flash Comics #62–76, 85–86, 88–90, 92–104 (Hawkman); #86 (inks over Lee Elias) (1945–1949)
- From Beyond the Unknown #13 (cover)(1971)
- Frontier Fighters #1–8 (1955–1956)
- Ghosts vol. 2 #1 (2012)
- G.I. Combat #44–45, 52–54, 56, 59, 62, 64–65, 67–70, 76–77, 79–80, 86, 99–100, 102–113, 133 (full art); #46 (inks over Ross Andru) (1957–1968)
- Heroes Against Hunger #1 (among other artists) (1986)
- House of Mystery #96 (1960)
- House of Secrets #29–30, 39 (1960)
- Jew Gangster SC (2011)
- Jimmy Wakely #3, 12, 14 (1950–1951)
- Joe Kubert Presents #1–6 (2012–2013)
- Just Imagine Stan Lee with Joe Kubert Creating Batman #1 (2001)
- Justice League of America #200 (among other artists) (1982)
- Korak, Son of Tarzan #49, 51, 58–59 (writer) (1972–1975)
- Leading Comics #8 (Seven Soldiers of Victory) (1943)
- More Fun Comics #97 (inks over Mort Meskin) (1944)
- Mystery in Space #35, 113 (1956–1980)
- Our Army at War #32–33, 38, 43, 46, 51, 54, 57, 59, 61, 64–65, 67–68, 73, 75, 79, 81, 83, 85–87, 90–105, 107, 109–112, 114–117, 119–122, 124, 126–163, 165–171, 174, 176, 179, 184, 188–189, 191–196, 198–202, 206–207, 217, 220–225, 227–228, 230, 233–234, 238, 289, 300 (full art); #282 (inks over Ric Estrada) (1955–1977)
- Our Fighting Forces #7, 9, 11–13, 15, 17–19, 22–25, 29, 33, 40, 43, 51–53, 64, 66, 69, 74, 76–77, 90 (full art); #104 (inks over Irv Novick) (1955–1966)
- Ragman #4–5 (1977)
- Sea Devils #13 (1963)
- Sensation Comics #35–36, 56–57, 66, 94 (1944–1949)
- Sgt. Rock #302–304, 306, 328, 368, 422 (1977–1988)
- Sgt. Rock Special #1 (1992)
- Sgt. Rock: Between Hell and a Hard Place HC (2003)
- Sgt. Rock: The Prophecy #1–6 (2006)
- Showcase #2, 25–26, 45, 57–58, 85–87 (full art); #4 (inks over Carmine Infantino) (1956–1969)
- Star-Spangled Comics #50–51 (1945)
- Star Spangled War Stories #33, 39, 43–46, 53–58, 60, 67, 69, 71, 74, 87, 98, 108, 124, 126, 137–143, 145, 147–152, 154–156, 158–160, 200 (full art); #144 (inks over Neal Adams) (1955–1976)
- Strange Adventures #55 (1955)
- Tarzan #207–225, 227–235 (writer/artist); #236, 239–249 (writer) (1972–1976)
- Tomahawk #124 (inks over Frank Thorne), 131–135 (cover), 136 (cover and Firehair story), 137 (cover), 140 (cover) (1969–1971)
- Tor vol. 2 #1–6 (1975–1976)
- Tor vol. 4 #1–6 (2008)
- Wednesday Comics #1–12 (Sgt. Rock) (2009)
- Weird War Tales #1–2, 7 (1971)
- World's Finest Comics #40–44, 54 (1949–1951)
- Yossel SC (2011)
- Young All-Stars Annual #1 (1988)

=== Marvel Comics ===
- Abraham Stone #1–2 (1995)
- Apache Kid #13 (1955)
- Battle #37, 41 (1955)
- Best Love #33 (inks over Hy Rosen) (1949)
- Captain America #16 (inks over Andy Kubert) (1999)
- Ghost Rider #28–31 (inks over Andy Kubert) (1992)
- Ghost Rider/Blaze: Spirits of Vengeance #4 (inks over Adam Kubert), 7–8, 13 (1992–1993)
- Girl Comics #2 (inks over Hy Rosen) (1950)
- Joe Kubert's Tor #1–4 (1993)
- Journey into Mystery #21 (1955)
- Journey into Unknown Worlds #34 (1955)
- Kid Colt Outlaw #48 (1955)
- Loveland #2 (inks over Hy Rosen) (1950)
- Lovers #25 (inks over Hy Rosen), 30 (1949–1950)
- Marines in Battle #7-8 (1955)
- Marvel Tales #122 (inks over Al Gordon), 134 (1954–1955)
- My Love #3 (inks over Hy Rosen) (1950)
- Our Love #2 (inks over Hy Rosen) (1950)
- The Punisher War Journal #31 (inks over Andy Kubert) (1991)
- The Punisher War Zone #31–36 (1994–1995)
- Uncanny Tales #28 (1955)
- War Comics #38 (1955)
- Western Outlaws #9 (1955)

=== Collected editions ===
- Tarzan: The Joe Kubert Years (Dark Horse Comics)
  - Volume 1 collects Tarzan #207–214, 200 pages, November 2005, ISBN 1593074042
  - Volume 2 collects Tarzan #215–224, 208 pages, March 2006, ISBN 1593074166
  - Volume 3 collects Tarzan #225–235, 216 pages, July 2006, ISBN 1-59307-417-4 (omits one page Kubert story "Tarzan's Animal Encyclopedia").
- Enemy Ace Archives (DC Comics)
  - Volume 1 collects Enemy Ace stories from Our Army at War #151, #153, #155; Showcase #57–58; Star Spangled War Stories #138–142, 224 pages, December 2002, ISBN 978-1563898969
  - Volume 2 collects Enemy Ace stories from Star-Spangled War Stories #143–145, #147–150, #152, #181–183, #200, 196 pages, September 2006, ISBN 978-1401207762 (Omits two Kubert stories from Star-Spangled War Stories #146).
- Hawkman Archives (DC Comics)
  - Volume 1 includes The Brave and the Bold #34–36 and #42–44, 240 pages, May 2000, ISBN 978-1563896118
- Sgt. Rock Archives (DC Comics)
  - Volume 1 collects Sgt. Rock stories from G.I. Combat #68; Our Army at War #81–96, 240 pages, May 2002, ISBN 978-1563898419
  - Volume 2 collects Sgt. Rock stories from Our Army at War #97–110, 216 pages, December 2003, ISBN 978-1401201463
  - Volume 3 collects Sgt. Rock stories from Our Army at War #111–125, 224 pages, August 2005, ISBN 978-1401204105
  - Volume 4 collects Sgt. Rock stories from Our Army at War #126–137 and Showcase #45, 248 pages, October 2012, ISBN 978-1401237264
- Tor (DC Comics)
  - Volume 1 144 pages, July 2001, ISBN 978-1563897818
  - Volume 2 144 October 2002, ISBN 978-1563898303
  - Volume 3 168 pages, September 2004, ISBN 978-1563899980
- Wednesday Comics DC Comics, 200 pages, June 2010, ISBN 1-4012-2747-3
- Joe Kubert's Tarzan of the Apes: Artist's Edition IDW Publishing, 156 pages, September 2012, ISBN 1613774494
