= Ken Barr =

Scottish artist

- Born: 17 March 1933; Glasgow, Scotland
- Died: 25 March 2016 (aged 83); Scotland
- Occupation: Artist

Kenneth Barr (17 March 1933 – 25 March 2016) was a Scottish artist who drew and painted DC and Marvel comics and magazines, Doc Savage magazine covers, science fiction and fantasy novel and magazine covers. His style evolved into powerful "photo-realism" depictions of heroes similar to the paintings of James Bama.
