= Haunted Tank =

Fictional DC comics feature

The Haunted Tank
- The Haunted Tank as depicted in G.I. Combat #114 (November 1965). Art by Russ Heath.

Publication information
- Publisher: DC Comics/Vertigo
- First comic appearance: G.I. Combat #87 (May 1961)
- Created by: Robert Kanigher; Russ Heath

In-story information
- Team affiliations: Team 13

The Haunted Tank is a comic book feature that appeared in the DC Comics anthology war title G.I. Combat from 1961 through 1987.

== Publication history ==
The Haunted Tank was created by writer and editor Robert Kanigher and artist Russ Heath in G.I. Combat #87 (May 1961). The feature centers on the ghost of 19th-century Confederate general J. E. B. Stuart, who is sent by the spirit of Alexander the Great to act as a guardian over his two namesakes, Lieutenant Jeb Stuart (named Jeb Stuart Smith in the early stories, eventually shortened to Jeb Stuart) and the M3 Stuart he commands.

The Haunted Tank was often the cover feature of G.I. Combat and was second only to Sgt. Rock as DC Comics' longest-running war series.

== Fictional character biography ==
An origin story in G.I. Combat #114 reveals that, at the time of the ghost's arrival, Jeb is a sergeant in the United States Army who commands an M3 Stuart tank fighting with the Allies in the North African Campaign. Jeb is a "Northerner" who met his crew at the Fort Nelson Tank Training Center in the South. Initially, the crew is upset that Jeb has the same name as the Confederate General Jeb Stuart and they demand that the Northerner change his name. After showing his quality by fighting all the men individually, the crew decide he has "earned" the name. The original crew consists of Jeb as tank commander; Arch Asher, loader; Rick Rawlins, gunner; and Slim Stryker, driver.

General Stuart's ghost does not initially care for his assignment, but is impressed with the fighting spirit of Jeb and his crew. Jeb flies a Confederate rather than a Union flag on his "haunted" tank. Jeb, however, is the only one who can see or hear the General. His crew thinks he is crazy, but continue to follow his leadership as he has solid tactical expertise (brought about through his consultations with the General, who usually gives him cryptic hints of future events) and rarely fails in his missions.

As the Haunted Tank fights from Africa to the European Theater of Operations, the crew goes through several M3 tanks. When their latest M3 is destroyed, the crew scavenge spare parts and wreckage from a "tank graveyard" to build themselves a new tank, known as the "Jigsaw Tank", which serves them from that point. This tank has a modified Russian T-34 hull, a Christie suspension system and a Russian Y2 12-cylinder diesel engine of 500 H.P. The nearly 15-foot track gives this rolling jigsaw puzzle excellent traction and it is capable of speeds up to 21 m.p.h.

Following a disastrous mission engineered to rescue the son of their commanding officer, General Norton, from a German administrated POW camp (based on the Task Force Baum incident), the crew of the Haunted Tank find themselves stranded behind enemy lines and spend several issues fighting their way back to the front. During this, they pick up Gus Gray, an African American soldier who had escaped from the same POW camp. Days later, Arch dies saving them from an exploding suicidal German tank and Gus takes his place in the crew.

A new M3 tank is eventually replaced by an M4A1 Sherman tank that sees them through to the end of the war. Despite a story that involves the ghost of General William T. Sherman being assigned to the tank after the crew switches to the Sherman, General Stuart's ghost continues to watch over the crew until war's end.

Later in the war, Slim is also killed in action and older veteran, Bill Craig, replaces him. Craig's son Eddie also joins the crew a few issues later, taking over the loader's position and allowing Gus to act as a second gunner.

The feature ended when G.I. Combat was cancelled with issue #288.

== Post G.I. Combat appearances ==
Secret Origins #14 (1987), featuring the Suicide Squad, reveals that Jeb Stuart is promoted to general after the war, but no mention is made of what happened to the others. The story also revealed that Stuart becomes the godfather of Richard Rodgers Flag, whose father led the World War II version of the Squad. Rick Flag subsequently leads the second and third incarnations of the Squad, and Stuart is instrumental in helping Amanda Waller in the formation of the Squad's third incarnation in the 1980s. The now-elderly General Stuart next appears in Suicide Squad #49–50, seeking the Squad's help to rescue Flag's only son, who has been kidnapped. Since Flag has been revealed in 2007's miniseries Suicide Squad: Raise the Flag to have been a false identity implanted in a soldier named Anthony Miller, Stuart's true role in Flag's background has become unclear.

In Hawk and Dove Annual #1 (1990), the General's ghost helps out the heroes Hawk and Dove and their team Titans West to escape Hell and a team of deceased supervillains.

The tank and its original crew briefly appear in #46–47 of The Demon, although Stuart's crew members are inexplicably given the names of Arch Stanton, Rick Parsons and Slim Kilkenny. The crew and the Demon retrieve the tank from a military warehouse and it is restored via magic. They work together to stop demonic Nazis that are rampaging through Texas. All the enemy forces are destroyed and the tank is left covered in the desert sands. The Haunted Tank and its original crew also appear in the 1999 supernatural "Day of Judgment" crossover in Anarky. In this issue, they fight demonic forces in the form of historical entities who wish to overthrow the President. The story ends before the battle does.

=== Jeb Stuart ===
Jeb Stuart lies between life and death, becoming a spirit guide to his granddaughter, Lieutenant Jennifer Stuart. Jen Stuart operates an advanced tank, the Cyber-Command Assault Vehicle, which becomes the new Haunted Tank. Jeb reflects on how his situation compares to the ghost of the General. The two assist the superhero group The Power Company in defeating an inter-dimensional menace that had been planning to conquer the earth with murder, mayhem and corporate mergers. During the mission, Jen is overcome by severe doubts as she is unsure if her grandfather's tactical advice is real or some sort of hallucination. The advice, like General Sherman's before him, proves sound and the menace is defeated. Jeb is able to talk to General Stuart, ghost to ghost, then recovers, meeting his granddaughter in the hospital room. He plans to reassure her all she experienced was really his advice.

The Haunted Tank appears in the 2006 incarnation of the Tales of the Unexpected comic. They assist Doctor Thirteen and other heroic characters in rescuing Traci Thirteen from Nazi gorillas. The General's ghost is mainly featured, becoming involved in a sword fight with the pirate ghost Captain Fear. Since both entities are deceased, the damage they deal to each other is ineffectual.

In the backup story "Snapshot: Remembrance" in the retrospective miniseries DC Universe: Legacies #4, set during a reunion on July 4, 1976, Jeb Stuart is teaching American History at Calvin College (where the Golden Age Atom studied) and says he has not spoken to the General in years. This story reveals Jeb has maintained a friendship with several other World War II veterans.

A G.I. Combat one-shot was published in 2010, featuring the Haunted Tank. In this story, set in 1944 during the liberation of France, Jeb Stuart and his team have a friendly rivalry with Lieutenant Billy Sherman, who commands an M4 Sherman. Sherman is killed by German snipers and Jeb, with the general's advice, uses the Sherman's gun to take them down. At the end of the story, it is revealed that Lt. Sherman was himself being guided by William T. Sherman and the two ghost generals discuss the situation.

Another G.I. Combat relaunch features a story where Jeb Stuart, now a grandfather, tries to rescue his grandson, Scott Stuart, and Scott's fellow soldiers, from armed captors.

=== Jamal Stuart ===
The Haunted Tank returned in 2008 as a five-issue miniseries from Vertigo, written by Frank Marraffino, with art by Henry Flint. The new series is set during Operation Iraqi Freedom, and features General J.E.B. Stuart becoming the guardian of an M1 Abrams, commanded by the General's descendant, the African-American Sergeant Jamal Stuart, who (at least initially) does not take kindly to the ghost's outmoded attitudes and language concerning his race.

The original Haunted Tank makes a guest appearance in the 2008 Vertigo miniseries Sgt. Rock: The Lost Battalion, set in October 1944, with Rick, Slim and Jeb (named as Jeb Stuart Smith once more). Arch is still alive at this point, but is said to be wounded and does not appear. The Haunted Tank was called "This here genuine piece of modern American firepower" to the Narrator, William J. Kilroy, who draws some "Kilroy was Here" graffiti.

A "DC Showcase" black and white trade paperback collection Haunted Tank Volume One, reprinting stories from between 1961 and 1965, was published in 2006. Haunted Tank Volume Two, reprinting stories from 1966 to 1972, was published in May 2008.

== In other media ==
- The Haunted Tank appears in the Batman: The Brave and the Bold episode "Menace of the Madniks!", with J.E.B. Stuart is voiced by Dee Bradley Baker.
- The Haunted Tank appears in a self-titled episode of Teen Titans Go!. This version is an unusually small unmanned tank associated with a ghost named General Tucker.
- In the Stargirl episode "Stars & S.T.R.I.P.E. Part Two" (2020), a poster for the film The Haunted Tank can be seen in the Blue Valley theater.
