= Showcase Presents =

American comic book series

Showcase Presents is a line of black-and-white paperback books that were published by DC Comics (from 2005 - 2016) at an average rate of two per month. Much like Marvel Comics' Essential Marvel volumes, each book usually included over 500 pages of reprints, primarily from the Silver Age. Like the Essential line, a Showcase Presents volume carried the suggested retail price of US$16.99 (increased to $17.99 in September 2009) and was usually devoted to one character, "reprint[ing] all of their adventures in sequential order via cover date", or occasionally to a specific title rather than individual. The reprint line started in October 2005 with the releases of Showcase Presents: Green Lantern, Vol. 1 and Showcase Presents: Superman, Vol. 1, both offered at the lower introductory retail price of US$9.99.

== Overview ==
=== Name ===
The name "Showcase" comes from a 1956–1970 DC anthology series often used to try out new characters. Showcase featured the first appearances of the Silver Age Flash (Barry Allen), Green Lantern (Hal Jordan), and the Atom (Ray Palmer), among other characters. That series was revived briefly in 1977–1978 and its name was used again in 1984–1985 (for New Talent Showcase and Talent Showcase) and 1993–1996 (for 12-issue anthologies, Showcase '93 et al.). The title was also used to reintroduce characters in the Action Comics Weekly series in 1988.

=== Focus and other collections ===
The Showcase Presents line was designed primarily to focus on the Silver Age DC stories, specifically — according to then-collected editions editor Bob Greenberger — "the rich era from the mid-1950s through the early 1970s", which is widely regarded as "one of DC's most fertile and creative periods".

"While Julie Schwartz was reviving the super-hero genre, his success allowed editors like George Kashdan and Murray Boltinoff [to] try more offbeat approaches to heroics with characters like Metamorpho and the Doom Patrol. It was also during this time that Mort Weisinger really began to explore the entire Superman mythos, adding not only to his family, but his rogues gallery as well. Thus, it was the most logical starting point since it offered us a chance to explore a variety of characters and approaches".

Greenberger noted that DC's collections department had already determined when Superman's Silver Age began for the purposes of the Man of Tomorrow Archive editions. Greenberger further clarified that the Showcase Presents volumes were specifically targeted — in the short term, at least — on the Silver Age, writing that "the Golden Age is not currently in ou[r] plans. The Modern is a fuzzier dividing line and again, should the line be wildly successful, we can figure this out".

DC's Showcase volumes complemented their Archive Editions, which reprinted in more expensive, color hardback volumes, primarily Golden Age and Silver Age comics, although some Archives presented Modern Age comics as well.

Six months prior to the debut of the Showcase volumes, DC also began to reprint Golden Age stories (initially only for Batman and Superman) previously presented in Archive format in more affordable color paperbacks, such as the DC Chronicles titles. While the Archives tended to focus on specific comics titles (e.g., largely separate volumes for stories presented in the pages of Batman and Detective Comics), the Chronicles and Showcase volumes took a more chronological approach, mingling the titles to present the stories in (roughly) the order they were initially printed.

Since the mid 2010s, the Showcase line is replaced by the DC Omnibus books.

=== Production ===
In contrast to the higher-quality and more expensive paperstock used for both the Archives and Chronicles volumes, the Showcase Presents books were, according to Greenberger, presented on "newsprint to maintain a traditional look and feel as well as to help keep the collections affordable".

The books were assembled largely from DC's extensive film archive (believed largely complete from the mid-1950s onward), with little need for extensive restoration. Occasionally, by virtue of the age of some of the film, Greenberger noted that "sometimes you find scratches that need cleaning", and even "[i]n some cases, you find odd missing pages". Other titles (such as the Teen Titans volumes) that had previously seen print in DC's Archives line even had the preliminary work done, leaving the Showcase columns with "nice, clean film or digital files to work from". According to the production staff, "[they scanned] in the photostats made from the film and then [scanned] in the stats. Then, on screen, [they cleaned] up scratches or blotches, correcting some punctuation and the usual work required to ready older stories for new readers".

The book design was by "Louis Prandi, one of our fine art directors", intended to be "faithful to the Showcase titles that have come before this as well as versatile for the wide range of genres [DC] hopes to present" in the Showcase format.

=== Possible reprint exceptions ===
Initially, Showcase Presents volumes were limited to a specific time period (roughly 1955–1975), limited not just by the Silver Age scope and availability of film, but by differences in contracts signed between creators and DC between the years 1976 and 1997.

As explained by Greenberger, "DC pays a royalty based on a percentage of the cover price to writers, pencillers, and inkers to all material published prior to 1976 and after 1997. For the period in between, the vouchers that were in use called for a set reprint fee to be paid. In some cases, the amount of contractually obligated reprint fees makes the budget for a proposed collection unprofitable".

In effect, this meant that the low retail price of the Showcase volumes could not easily cover the contractually-required reprint fee that any republication would require. However, as Greenberger goes on to note, although this precluded some volumes from being produced under such contractually-stipulated guidelines, since not reprinting issues necessarily results in no reprint fee or royalty payments, in most cases DC will be able to negotiate with "the talent involved to waive the reprint fee in lieu of the standard royalty arrangement", since "[i]f the parties agree, then everyone benefits". Thus, as with pre-1976 comics, royalty payments based on sales, rather than a flat single fee, can easily be factored into the cost-structures of the Showcase volumes.

Affected volumes included the solicited Suicide Squad, Captain Carrot and His Amazing Zoo Crew!, The Great Disaster featuring the Atomic Knights, The Secret Society of Super Villains, and Jonah Hex Vol. 2, as well as the not-officially-solicited but announced Who's Who in the DC Universe.

In April 2008, Paul Levitz referred to such contractual issues in a post on his Newsarama blog, writing (emphasis added):

When we introduced that first talent contract, it had a flat guaranteed reprint fee per page. In the pre-royalty days, that was an important step forward... but in the royalty era, it turned out to be cumbersome and uneconomical for some projects (most talent would rather receive a royalty stream than have a project not get published).

He goes on to note specifically that "this is the situation that's limited our ability to [produce] a few Showcase projects we planned last year, and we've successfully amended many of the relevant agreements since, so hopefully some of those projects will see the light of day".

== See also ==
- List of comic books on CD/DVD
