= Brushstroke (disambiguation) =

Brushstroke is a sculpture by Roy Lichtenstein in Madrid and Washington, D.C.

Brushstroke, Brushstrokes or Brush Strokes may also refer to:

== Film and television ==
- Brushstrokes (film), 1982
- Brush Strokes, a British sitcom (1986–1991)

== Visual arts ==
- Brushstrokes, a painting by Roy Lichtenstein
- Brushstrokes (sculpture), by Roy Lichtenstein, in Portland, Oregon
- Brushstrokes series, a painting series by Roy Lichtenstein

== Other uses ==
- Brushstroke (restaurant), a defunct restaurant in New York City
- Brush Strokes Image Editor, a bitmap graphics editor
- The Rhodesian Brushstroke, a camouflage pattern

== See also ==
- Five Brushstrokes
