= Big Painting No. 6 =

1965 painting by Roy Lichtenstein

- Artist: Roy Lichtenstein
- Year: 1965
- Movement: Pop art
- Dimensions: 235 cm × 330 cm (92.5 in × 129 in)
- Location: Kunstsammlung Nordrhein-Westfalen; Düsseldorf

Big Painting No. 6 (sometimes Big Painting or Big Painting VI) is a 1965 oil and Magna on canvas painting by Roy Lichtenstein. Measuring 235 cm × 330 cm (92.5 in × 129 in), it is part of the Brushstrokes series of artworks that includes several paintings and sculptures whose subject is the actions made with a house-painter's brush. It set a record auction price for a painting by a living American artist when it sold for $75,000 in 1970. The painting is in the Kunstsammlung Nordrhein-Westfalen collection.

As with all of his Brushstrokes works, it is in part a satirical response to the gestural painting of Abstract Expressionism. Like most of Lichtenstein's Ben-Day dots works it is a depiction of mechanical reproduction via painterly technique. In this case, the satire comes from the depiction of the graphical depiction of the spontaneous painting motion in painstaking painterly detail.

== History ==
In early 1970, Andy Warhol established the record auction price for a painting by a living American artist with a $60,000 (US$497,429 in 2025 dollars) sale of Big Campbell's Soup Can with Torn Label (Vegetable Beef) (1962), which is part of the Campbell's Soup Cans series, in a sale at Parke-Bernet, the preeminent American auction house of the day (later acquired by Sotheby's). This record was broken in November 1970 by Lichtenstein's Big Painting No. 6 with an auction sale for $75,000 (US$621,787 in 2025 dollars) to German art dealer Rudolf Zwirner.

The source for the entire Brushstrokes series was Charlton Comics' Strange Suspense Stories 72 (October 1964) by Dick Giordano. Big Painting No. 6 is in the Kunstsammlung Nordrhein-Westfalen collection in Düsseldorf.

== Description ==
This painting has a Ben-Day dots background with four layered vigorous brushstrokes atop them in white, yellow, green, and red. The focal point is the topmost central red brushstroke that depicts dripping paint. The black contours contribute a dynamic effect to the two-dimensional work. The subject of the painting is the process of Abstract Expressionist painting via sweeping brushstrokes and drips, but the result of Lichtenstein's simplification that uses a Ben-Day dots background is a representation of the mechanical/industrial color printing reproduction. Big Painting No. 6 is depicts imitations of what could be typical Abstract Expressionist brushstrokes on an extremely large scale. Since it is depicted as a reproduction of an imitation the painting is two steps removed from an original. While each Abstract Expressionist brushstroke is an instantaneous effort, the satire includes the fact that Lichtenstein took a great deal of time to achieve the complicated reproduction.

== Reception ==
Big Painting No. 6. is a prime example of his works that both turned a mundane household task into a planned artistic operation and made a time-consuming task appear as if it was produced mechanically in an instant. The painting is regarded as an example of his subtle humor expressed as "gestural swathes rendered in commercial harshness as a parody of action painting."

According to Robert Rosenblum, by confronting the state of the art world, Lichtenstein reinforces its vitality: "...the vocabulary of Abstract Expressionism, attacked implicitly in Lichtenstein's earlier work, now becomes the explicit subject. With disarming paradox, the impulsive, athletic smears and spatterings of the 1950s are here impersonally hardened and industrialized by being seen through Lichtenstein's lens of commercial imagery. The results are not only witty in their use of art to comment about art, but even revive, most ironically, the pictorial energy and boldness of the style being parodied."

He uses overlapping forms rather than a single form or distinct adjacent forms, which seems to create a more dynamic feel to the shallow space. However, since Lichtenstein does not uses shading or contrast, the monochromatic strokes with just bold black outlines are void of certain elements of depth. Big Painting No. 6 and Yellow and Green Brushstrokes go one step further in terms of canvas size and dynamic activity that was presented earlier in Little Big Painting.

Big Painting No. 6 is the result of producing "...whiplash, abstract expressionist works with his quasi-mechanical means..." Lichtenstein's form of Abstract Expressionism uses a "quasi-mechanical" method to conform "the spontaneous, loaded brushstroke to his own comic-strip and Ben Day formula". One critic considers that Lichtenstein has converted the wide dripping brush strokes into a tidy work representing mass production.

== See also ==
- 1965 in art
