= Little Big Painting =

Painting by Roy Lichtenstein

- Artist: Roy Lichtenstein
- Year: 1965
- Medium: Oil and Magna on canvas
- Movement: Pop art
- Dimensions: 172.7 cm × 203.2 cm (68 in × 80 in)
- Location: Whitney Museum of American Art; New York

Little Big Painting is a 1965 oil and Magna on canvas pop art painting by the American artist Roy Lichtenstein. It is part of the Brushstrokes series of artworks that include several paintings and sculptures. It is located at the Whitney Museum of American Art in New York City. As with all of his Brushstrokes works, it is in part a satirical response to the gestural painting of abstract expressionism.

== Background ==
The source for the entire Brushstrokes series was Charlton Comics' Strange Suspense Stories "The Painting" #72 (October 1964) by Dick Giordano.

Measuring 172.7 cm × 203.2 cm (68.0 in × 80.0 in), Little Big Painting is part of the collection of the Whitney Museum of American Art. It was acquired by purchase. The source for the entire Brushstrokes series was Charlton Comics' Strange Suspense Stories 72 (October 1964) by Dick Giordano. Like the rest of the 1960s elements of the series, this work is a response to the Abstract Expressionism of the prior two decades and was interpreted as a "wry commentary" in the Whitney Museum's accompanying statement plaque for its inaugural exhibition (America Is Hard to See) at its new location in 2015.

== Details ==
Little Big Painting is quite attentive to the "physical qualities of the brushstroke" relative to other Brushstrokes series works. It is an example of the use of overlapping forms rather than a single form or distinct adjacent forms, which seems to create a more dynamic feel to the shallow space. However, since Lichtenstein does not uses shading or contrast, the monochromatic strokes with just bold black outlines are void of certain elements of depth. However, the thick solid black lines surrounding the various uses of color resemble a comic strip style. The carefully orchestrated paint drips mimick the spontaneous results of the gestures of preceding style. The work contains no narrative, leaving just the comic book form of Benday dots presented according to a plotted outline. Later Brushstrokes works such as Big Painting No. 6 and Yellow and Green Brushstrokes go one step further in terms of canvas size and dynamic activity that was presented earlier in Little Big Painting.

Lichtenstein presents work that resembled the abstract expressionism that the contemporaneous viewing audience had become accustomed to seeing, however, his result is completely flat, without any trace of the brushstroke or the artist's hand. Meanwhile, the work references mechanical printing with the Ben-Day dots background, which enables Lichtenstein to parody his predecessors and make a "powerful abstract composition". Although Abstract Expressionists in general considered their style as opposing popular culture, Lichtenstein's juxtaposition of the Brushstrokes against the mechanical process links the style to popular culture and results in a statement of the importance of mass media in the promotion of the style.

== See also ==
- 1965 in art
