= Yellow and Green Brushstrokes =

Painting by Roy Lichtenstein

- Artist: Roy Lichtenstein
- Year: 1966
- Medium: Oil and Magna on canvas
- Movement: Pop art
- Dimensions: 213.4 cm × 457.2 cm (84 in × 180 in)
- Location: Museum für Moderne Kunst; Frankfurt

Yellow and Green Brushstrokes is a 1966 oil and Magna on canvas pop art painting by Roy Lichtenstein. It is part of the Brushstrokes series of artworks that includes several paintings and sculptures. It is located at the Museum für Moderne Kunst in Frankfurt, Germany. As with all of his Brushstrokes works, it is in part a satirical response to the gestural painting of Abstract Expressionism. It is in the collection of the Museum für Moderne Kunst.

== Background ==
The source for the entire Brushstrokes series was Charlton Comics' Strange Suspense Stories "The Painting" #72 (October 1964) by Dick Giordano.

Yellow and Green Brushstrokes is located at the Museum für Moderne Kunst in Frankfurt, Germany. The museum acquired the work from the collection of Karl Ströher in 1981. The source for the entire Brushstrokes series was Charlton Comics' Strange Suspense Stories 72 (October 1964) by Dick Giordano.

According to the Lichtenstein Foundation, Lichtenstein produced two distinct 1966 oil and Magna on canvases by the title Yellow and Green Brushstrokes. The second one is smaller at 36 by 68 inches (91 by 173 centimetres). It involved much straighter brushstrokes.

The painting depicts two brushstrokes magnified to cover the entire vast canvas. This is one of several such Brushstrokes series representations that seem "absurd".

== Details ==
Measuring 213.4 cm × 457.2 cm (84.0 in × 180.0 in), Yellow and Green Brushstrokes is regarded as quite notable for its ability to imply perceptible movement although his works is limited to a single image on a canvas with finite space. The movement is considered similar to the explosive actions evident in earlier works such as Whaam! and As I Opened Fire. He uses overlapping forms rather than a single form or distinct adjacent forms, which seems to create a more dynamic feel to the shallow space. However, since Lichtenstein does not use shading or contrast, the monochromatic strokes with just bold black outlines are void of certain elements of depth. Big Painting No. 6 and Yellow and Green Brushstrokes go one step further in terms of canvas size and dynamic activity that was presented earlier in Little Big Painting. At 15 feet (4.57 m) wide, the magnitude of the work is exceptional for Lichtenstein. Edward F. Fry described the work in the October 1969 ARTnews as "The heroic brushstroke of Abstract-Expressionism mocked by objective treatment in comic-strip idiom". This work is regarded as a rare example of Lichtenstein performing as a "virtuoso painter" and using "bravura technique".

== See also ==
- 1966 in art
