= Dick Giordano =

American comic book artist and editor (1932-2010)

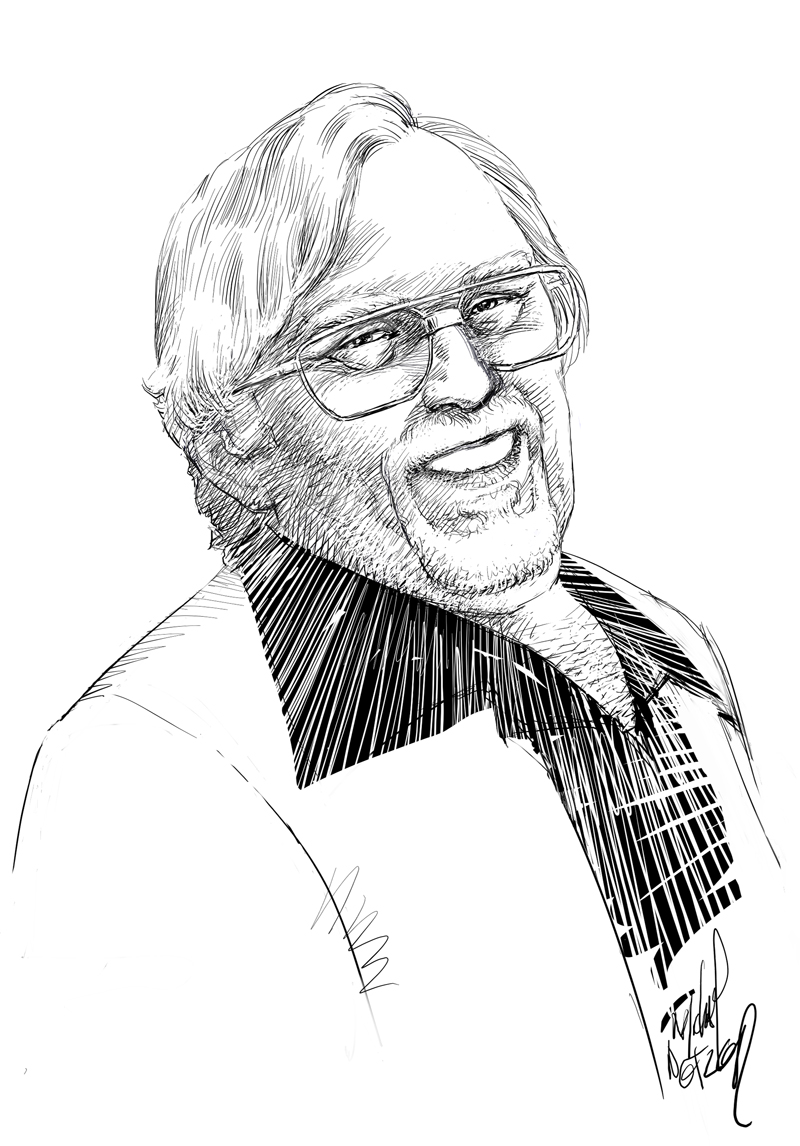
- Dick Giordano by Michael Netzer
- Born: Richard Joseph Giordano; July 20, 1932 New York City, U.S.
- Died: March 27, 2010 (aged 77) Ormond Beach, Florida, U.S.
- Areas: Penciller, Inker, Editor
- Notable works: Action Comics (Human Target); Batman; Detective Comics; Wonder Woman
- Awards: Alley Award: Best Editor (1969); Shazam Award: Best Inker (Dramatic Division) (1970, 1971, 1973, and 1974); Inkwell Awards: Joe Sinnott Hall of Fame (2009)

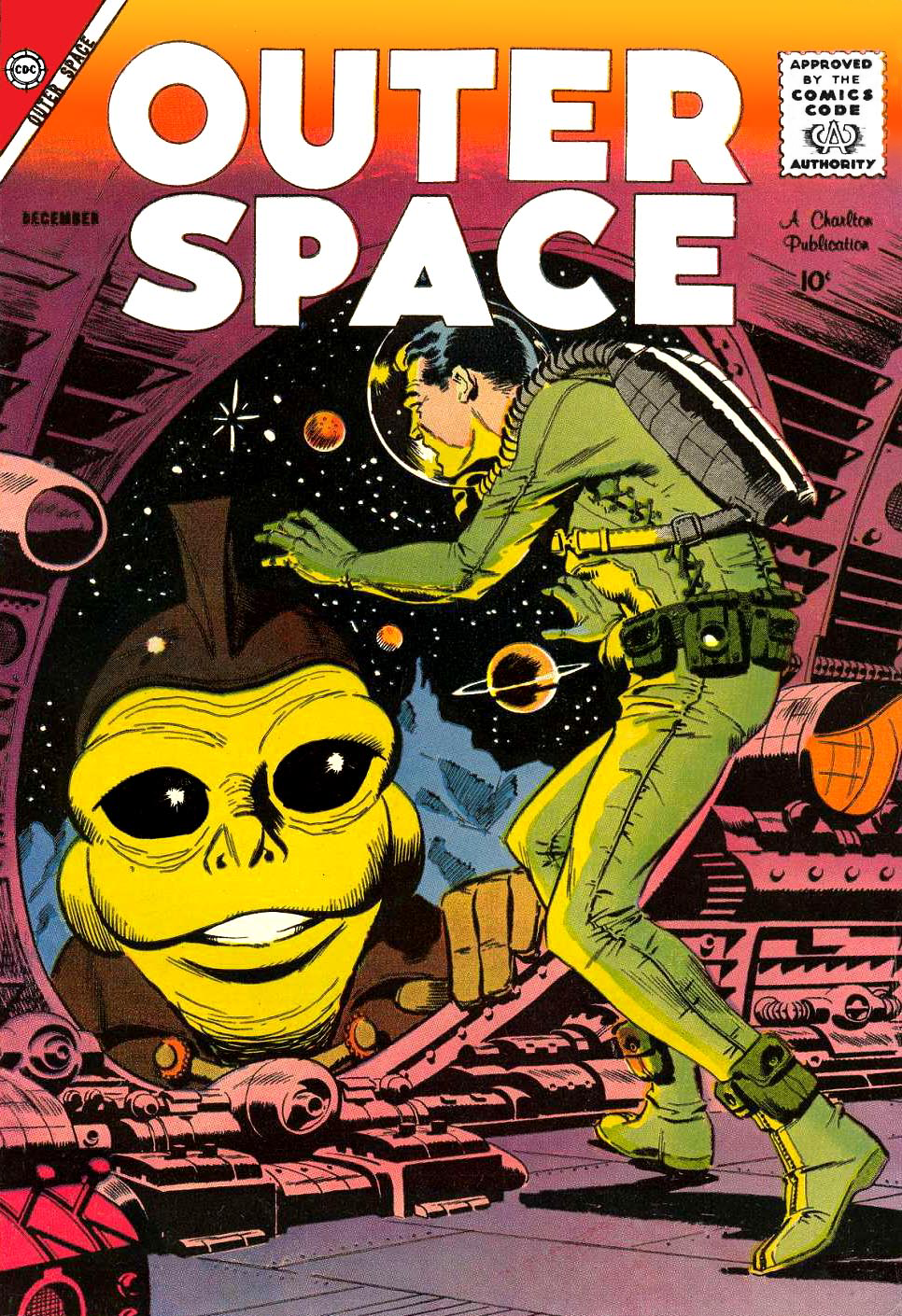
Dick Giordano cover for Outer Space no. 20 (Charlton, Dec. 1958).

Richard Joseph Giordano (/dʒɔːrˈdɑːnoʊ/; July 20, 1932 – March 27, 2010) was an American comics artist and editor whose career included introducing Charlton Comics' "Action Heroes" stable of superheroes and serving as executive editor of DC Comics.

== Early life ==
Dick Giordano, an only child, was born in New York City on July 20, 1932, in the borough of Manhattan to Josephine Labruzzi and Graziano "Jack" Giordano. He was "sickly as a child" and spent a significant amount of his childhood in bed. After his father brought him a copy of Famous Funnies, he became hooked on comics and, by age seven, began to draw his own stories on brown paper grocery bags. In elementary school, he played baseball and began writing and drawing sports stories and adaptations of pulp adventures.

He attended New York's vocational high school, the School of Industrial Art, and began reading EC Comics, becoming inspired by cartoonists Al Feldstein and Harvey Kurtzman.

== Career ==
=== Charlton Comics ===
Beginning as a freelance artist at Charlton Comics in 1952, Giordano contributed artwork to dozens of the company's comics, including such Western titles as Annie Oakley, Billy the Kid, and Wyatt Earp, the war comic Fightin' Army, and scores of covers.

Giordano's artwork from Charlton's Strange Suspense Stories was used as inspiration for artist Roy Lichtenstein's 1965/1966 Brushstroke series, including Brushstroke, Big Painting No. 6, Little Big Painting and Yellow and Green Brushstrokes.

By the mid-1960s a Charlton veteran, Giordano rose to executive editor, succeeding Pat Masulli, by 1965. As an editor, he made his first mark in the industry, overseeing Charlton's revamping of its few existing superheroes and having his artists and writers create new such characters for what he called the company's "Action Hero" line. Many of these artists included new talent Giordano brought on board, including Jim Aparo, Dennis O'Neil, and Steve Skeates.

=== DC Comics ===
DC Comics vice president Irwin Donenfeld hired Giordano as an editor in April 1968, at the suggestion of Steve Ditko, with Giordano bringing over to DC some of the creators he had nurtured at Charlton. Giordano was given several titles such as Teen Titans, Aquaman and Young Love, but none of DC's major series. He launched the horror comics series The Witching Hour in March 1969. and the Western series All-Star Western vol. 2 in September 1970.

He continued to freelance for DC as a penciler and inker. As an artist, Giordano was best known as an inker. His inking was particularly associated with the pencils of Neal Adams, for their run in the early 1970s on the titles Batman and Green Lantern/Green Arrow. Comics historian Les Daniels observed that "The influential Adams style moved comics closer to illustration than cartooning, and he brought a menacing mood to Batman's adventures that was augmented by Dick Giordano's dark, brooding inks."

=== Continuity Associates ===
By 1971, frustrated by what he felt was a lack of editorial opportunities, Giordano had left DC to partner with fellow artist Neal Adams for their Continuity Associates studios, which served as an art packager for comic book publishers, including such companies as Giordano's former employer Charlton Comics, Marvel Comics, and the one-shot Big Apple Comix. Several comics artists began their careers at Continuity and many were mentored by Giordano during their time there.

He had a brief run as penciler of the Wonder Woman series which included a two-issue story in issues #202–203 (October and December 1972) written by science-fiction author Samuel R. Delany. Giordano drew several backup stories in Action Comics featuring the Human Target character as well as the martial arts feature "Sons of the Tiger" in Marvel's black-and-white comics magazine The Deadly Hands of Kung Fu. He was a frequent artist on Batman and Detective Comics and he and writer Denny O'Neil created the Batman supporting character Leslie Thompkins in the story "There Is No Hope in Crime Alley" in Detective Comics #457 (March 1976). Giordano inked the large-format, first DC/Marvel intercompany crossover, Superman vs. the Amazing Spider-Man (1976), over the pencils of Ross Andru. Giordano inked Adams on the one-shot Superman vs. Muhammad Ali in 1978. Throughout the late 1970s and the early 1980s, Ross Andru and Giordano were DC's primary cover artists, providing cover artwork for the Superman titles as well as covers for many of the other comics in the DC line at that time.

=== Return to DC ===
In 1980, DC publisher Jenette Kahn brought Giordano back to DC. Initially the editor of the Batman titles, Giordano was named the company's new managing editor in 1981, and promoted to vice president/executive editor in 1983, a position he held until 1993. DC Comics writer and executive Paul Levitz observed in 2010 that "Giordano held the respect of talent as one of their own, and kept their affection with his reassuring calm and warmth."

Giordano provided art for several anniversary issues of key DC titles. He and television writer Alan Brennert crafted the story "To Kill a Legend" in Detective Comics #500 (March 1981). Giordano was one of the artists on the double-sized Justice League of America #200 (March 1982) as well as Wonder Woman #300 (Feb. 1983). He was promoted to Vice-President/Executive Editor in 1984, and with Kahn and Levitz, oversaw the relaunch of all of DC's major characters with the Crisis on Infinite Earths limited series in 1985. This was followed by Frank Miller's Batman: The Dark Knight Returns and Alan Moore and Dave Gibbons' Watchmen in 1986. Giordano inked several major projects during this time such as George Pérez's pencils on Crisis on Infinite Earths and John Byrne's pencils on The Man of Steel and Action Comics, though during this period he always employed assistants for inking backgrounds, filling in large black areas, and making final erasures.

From 1983 to 1987, Giordano wrote a monthly column published in DC titles called "Meanwhile..." which much like Marvel's "Bullpen Bulletins" featured news and information about the company and its creators. Unlike "Bullpen Bulletins," which was characterized by an ironic, over-hyped tone, Giordano's columns ". . . were written in a relatively sober, absolutely friendly voice, like a friend of your father's you particularly liked and didn't mind sitting down to listen to." Giordano closed each "Meanwhile..." column with the characteristic words, "Thank you and good afternoon."

The Vertigo imprint was launched in early 1993 built upon the success of several titles edited by Karen Berger including Swamp Thing, Hellblazer, Sandman, Doom Patrol, Animal Man, and Shade, the Changing Man. Giordano inked six issues of The Sandman in 1991–1993.

=== Creators' rights ===
Beginning in 1987, Giordano was in the middle of an industry-wide debate about the comics industry, ratings systems, and creators' rights. Veteran writers Mike Friedrich, Steven Grant, and Roger Slifer all cited Giordano in particular for his hard-line stance on behalf of DC. This debate led in part to the 1988 drafting of the Creator's Bill of Rights.

=== Later career ===
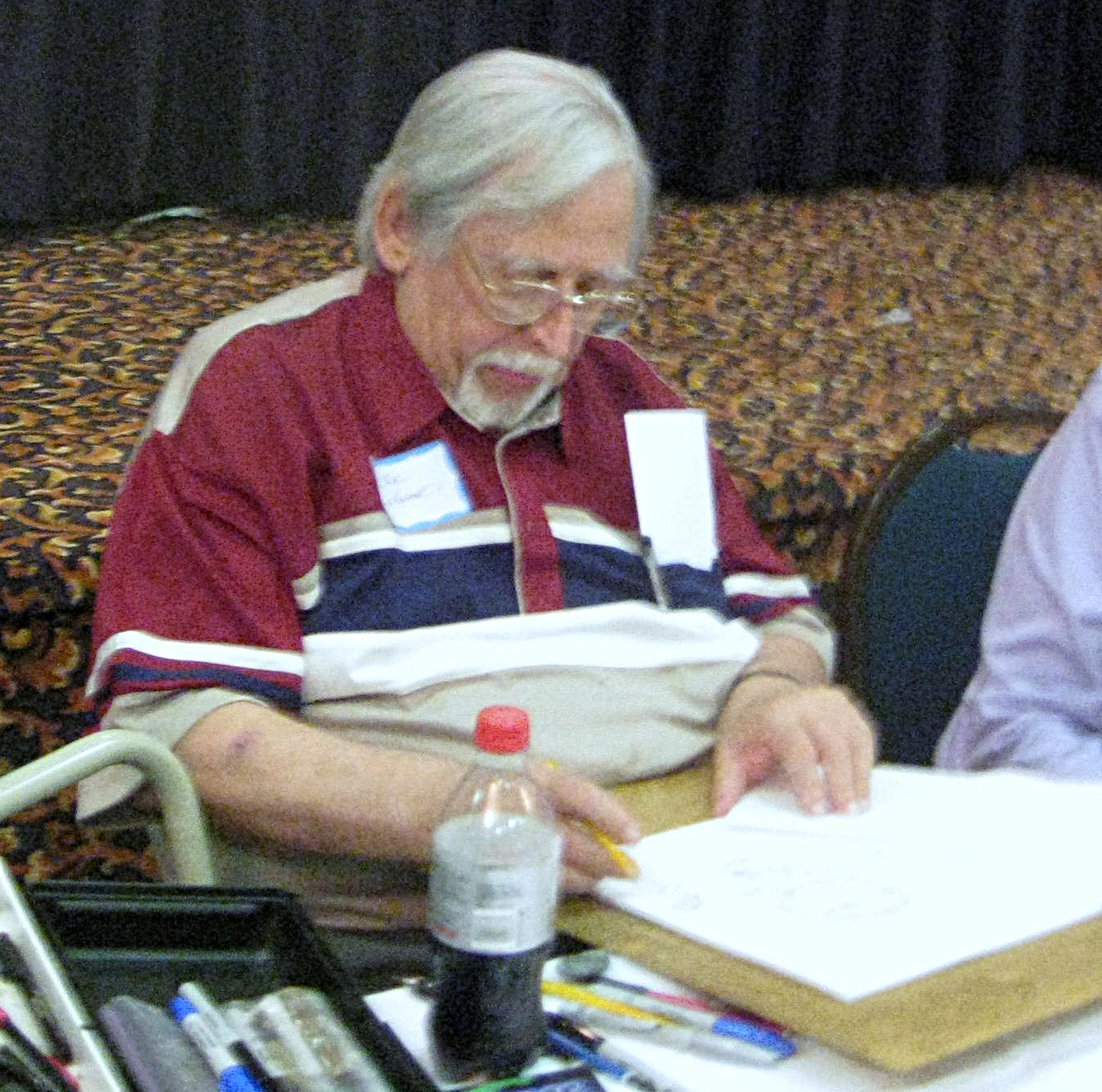
Giordano signing at a comic convention, August 2008.

Giordano left DC in 1993, and still did the occasional inking job, but later returned to freelancing full-time. In 1994 Giordano illustrated a graphic novel adaptation of the novel Modesty Blaise released by DC Comics, with creator/writer Peter O'Donnell. He was one of the many artists who contributed to the Superman: The Wedding Album one-shot in 1996 wherein the title character married Lois Lane.

In 2002, Giordano launched the short-lived Future Comics with writer David Michelinie and artist Bob Layton. Since 2002, Giordano had drawn several issues of The Phantom published in Europe and Australia. In 2004, Giordano and writer Roy Thomas completed an adaptation of Bram Stoker's Dracula novel. They had begun the project in 1974 but the cancellation of many of Marvel's black and white magazines put it into limbo. The finished story was collected into a hardcover edition in 2005 and a colorized hardcover edition in 2010. In 2005, F+W Publications Inc. published the instructional art book Drawing Comics with Dick Giordano, which he wrote and illustrated. His last mainstream work appeared in Jonah Hex vol. 2, #51 (March 2010) for which he drew the interior art and the cover. His last comics work was pencilling and editing Baron Five, published by Hound Comics.

== Personal life ==
Giordano married Marie Trapani, sister of fellow comics artist Sal Trapani, on April 17, 1955. She died from complications of her second stomach cancer surgery in February 1993. They had three children together; Lisa, Dawn, and Richard Jr. Marie's death, combined with Giordano's increasing hearing loss, hastened his decision to retire from DC. Following the death of his wife, Giordano split time between homes in Florida and Connecticut. In 1995, he moved to Palm Coast, Florida, where he continued to work full-time freelancing, until his death. Giordano had suffered from lymphoma and later from leukemia, secondary to the chemotherapy. He died on March 27, 2010, due to complications of treatment for leukemia.

== Legacy ==
Giordano served as mentor or inspiration to a generation of inkers, including Terry Austin, Mike DeCarlo, and Bob Layton.

Shortly after Giordano's death in 2010, The Hero Initiative created "The Dick Giordano Humanitarian of the Year Award", which debuted at the 2010 Harvey Awards ceremony held at the Baltimore Comic-Con. The award recognizes one person in comics each year who demonstrates particular generosity and integrity in support of the overall comic book community.

== Awards ==
Giordano received recognition in the industry for his work, including the Alley Award for Best Editor in 1969. He won the Shazam Award for Best Inker (Dramatic Division) in 1970 (for Green Lantern), 1971, 1973 (for Justice League of America), and 1974. He won the 1971 Goethe Award for "Favorite Pro Editor." Giordano received an Inkpot Award in 1981. In 2009 he was awarded the Inkwell Awards Joe Sinnott Hall of Fame Award.

== Bibliography ==
Comics work (interior full art – pencils and inks, except where noted) includes:

=== Archie Comics ===
- Archie's Super Hero Comics Digest Magazine (Black Hood) #2 (inks over Neal Adams) (1979)
- Chilling Adventures in Sorcery #4 (1973)

=== Charlton Comics ===
- Battlefield Action #55 (1964)
- Billy the Kid #10 (inks over Maurice Whitman) (1957)
- Brides in Love #1 (1956)
- Cowboy Western #48–50, 55–56 (1954–1955)
- Crime and Justice #9, 12, 14, 16 (full art); #8 (inks over Albert Tyler) (1952–1953)
- Eh #1 (1953)
- Frank Merriwell at Yale #1–4 (1955–1956)
- Hot Rods and Racing Cars #8–17, 19–24 (full art); #12 (inks over Art Cappello) (1953–1955)
- Judomaster #91–92, 95–98 (full art); #93–94 (inks over Bill Montes) (Sarge Steel backup stories) (1966–1967)
- Lawbreakers Suspense Stories #11–15 (1953)
- Love Diary #1–3 , 6, 10, 21, 23–24, 31–32 (1958–1964)
- Racket Squad in Action #4–6, 14–17 (full art); #1, 16 (inks over Albert Tyler) (1952–1955)
- Rocky Lane Western #56–64 (1954)
- Sarge Steel #1–4, 7 (1964–1966)
- Secret Agent #10 (Sarge Steel backup story) (1967)
- Six-Gun Heroes #25–30 (1954)
- Space Adventures #2–10, 12, 19 (full art); #1 (inks over Albert Tyler); #4, 9 (inks over Art Cappello); #11 (inks over Joe Shuster)
- Strange Suspense Stories #16–22, 31 (1954–1957)
- Tex Ritter Western #26 (1954)
- Thing #6 (full art); #3 (inks over John Belfi) (1952–1953)
- This Is Suspense #23–25 (1955)
- True Life Secrets #8 (inks over Albert Tyler) (1952)
- Wild Frontier #3, 7 (1956–1957)

=== DC Comics ===
- 'Mazing Man #2 (inks) (1986)
- Action Comics (Human Target) #420, 422–423, 426, 428–429, 432 (full art); #419 (inks over Carmine Infantino), #425 (inks over Neal Adams), #641 (inks over Curt Swan); (Green Arrow) #428 (full art); #421 (inks over Sal Amendola), #424, 426, 431 (inks over Dick Dillin); (Atom) #427, 430, 433, 435 (inks over Dick Dillin); (Green Lantern) #605 (inks over Gil Kane); (Superman) #509 (inks over Jim Starlin pencils), #584–590, 600 (inks over John Byrne), #723 (inks over various pencilers), #836 (pencils, among other artists) (1972–2006)
- Action Comics Annual #1 (inks over Arthur Adams) (1987)
- Adventure Comics (Supergirl) #405, 408–409 (inks over Mike Sekowsky); (Zatanna) #419; (Deadman) #462, 465 (inks over José Luis García-López); (Aquaman) #475–478 (1971–1980)
- Adventure Comics 80-Page Giant #1 (Captain Marvel, inks over Craig Rousseau) (1998)
- Adventures in the DC Universe Annual (Rose and Thorn and Zatanna) #1 (1997)
- Adventures of Superman #431 (inks over Erik J. Larsen), #466 (inks over Dan Jurgens), #536 (inks), #Annual 2 (inks over Kerry Gammill), 3 (inks over Bryan Hitch) (1987-1996)
- All New Collectors' Edition #C-56 (inks over Neal Adams), C-58 (inks over Rich Buckler) (1978)
- All-Star Western #5, 7 (inks over Alan Weiss (1971)
- American Century #7 (2001)
- Animal Man #39 (inks over Tom Mandrake) (1991)
- Aquaman #Annual 5 (inks over M. D. Bright) (1999)
- Armageddon: Inferno miniseries (JSA) #4 (1992)
- Armageddon: The Alien Agenda miniseries, (Captain Atom) #4 (1992)
- Atari Force #1–5 (inks over Ross Andru) (1982–1983)
- Batman (Batman backup stories) #247, 250; (Batman and Robin backup story) #327; (Batman) #421 (full art); #219–222, 224–227, 235–236, 239–242, 246, 249–250, 252–254, 256–261, 266, 310 (inks over Irv Novick); #232, 234, 237, 243–245, 255 (inks over Neal Adams); #248 (inks over Bob Brown); #262–264, 267 (inks over Ernie Chan); #298–299, 302 (inks over John Calnan); #300, 312, 321 (inks over Walt Simonson); #359 (inks over Dan Jurgens); Annual #9 (inks over Dan Jurgens); #409 (inks over Ross Andru); #497 (inks over Jim Aparo); #509 (inks over Mike Manley) (1973–1994)
- Batman and the Outsiders #12 (inks over Jim Aparo) (1984)
- Batman: Catwoman Defiant (inks over Tom Grindberg) (1992)
- The Batman Chronicles #13 (inks over Sal Buscema), 21 (1998–2000)
- Batman: Dark Knight of the Round Table, miniseries, #1–2 (1998)
- Batman: Gordon of Gotham, miniseries, #1–4 (1998)
- Batman: Gotham Knights #19, 28 (2001–2002)
- Batman: Gotham Nights II #1–4 (inks over Mary Mitchell) (1995)
- Batman: Hollywood Knight #1–3 (2001)
- Batman: Legends of the Dark Knight #79 (inks over Steve Yeowell) (1996)
- Batman: Shadow of the Bat #6 (inks over Dan Jurgens); Annual #1 (inks over Trevor Von Eden) (1992-1993)
- Batman: Turning points #3 (2001)
- Birds of Prey #11–12, 18 (full art), #95 (inks over Joe Prado) (1999–2006)
- Birds of Prey: Wolves graphic novel (1997)
- Black Canary: New Wings miniseries #1–4 (over Trevor Von Eeden layouts) (1991–1992)
- Black Orchid #17 (inks over Rebecca Guay) (1995)
- Books of Magic #Annual 1 (inks over Mark Buckingham) (1997)
- The Brave and the Bold (Flash and Doom Patrol) #65; (Human Target) #143–144; (Batman and Black Lightning) #163; (Batman and Black Canary) #166 (full art); #80–81, 102 (inks over Neal Adams); #87 (inks over Mike Sekowsky); (1966–1980)
- Camelot 3000 #6 (inks over Brian Bolland (1983)
- Captain Action #3 (1968)
- Catwoman #1–7, 25 (inks over Jim Balent) #31–32 (1993–1996)
- Celebrate the Century Super Heroes Stamp Album #1–5 (full art); #2 (inks over Chris Batista); #5 (inks over Peter Krause) (1998–1999)
- Christmas with the Super-Heroes (Deadman) #2 (1988)
- Crisis on Infinite Earths #1–3, 7 (inks over George Pérez) (1985)
- Daring New Adventures of Supergirl (Lois Lane) #8, 10 (inks over Bob Oksner)
- DC Challenge #8 (inks over Rick Hoberg) (1986)
- DC Comics Presents #12, 33–34 (inks over Rich Buckler); #13–14 (inks over Dick Dillin); #26 (inks over George Pérez); #27 (inks over Jim Starlin); #31 (inks over García-López) (1979–1981)
- DC Special Series #8 (inks over Ric Estrada); #15 (inks over Michael Golden); #21, 27 (inks over García-López) (1978–1981)
- DC Super Stars #18 (inks over Romeo Tanghal); (1978)
- DC Universe Holiday Bash #1 (inks over Paul Ryan) (1997)
- Demolition Man, miniseries, #1–4 (inks over Rod Whigham) (1993)
- Detective Comics (Elongated Man) #426, 430, 436, 449; (Batman) #457; (Human Target) #484, 486, 493; (Batgirl) #487; (Batman and Robin) #500 (full art); (Batman) #395, 397, 400, 402, 404, 407–408, 410 (inks over Neal Adams); #414–415, 418–419, 425, 427, 434–435 (inks over Irv Novick); #439–440 (inks over Sal Amendola); #411–413, 417, 422–424, 428 (inks over Bob Brown); #433 (inks over Dick Dillin); #447–448 (inks over Ernie Chan); #478–479 (inks over Marshall Rogers); #524 (inks over Don Newton); #525 (inks over Dan Jurgens); #529–530 (inks over Gene Colan); #572 (inks over Terry Beatty); #598–600 (inks over Denys Cowan); Annual #2 (inks over Dan Jurgens); #618 (inks over Norm Breyfogle); #665 (inks over Graham Nolan) (1972–1993)
- Doom Link #1 (inks over Eduardo Barreto) (1995)
- Dreaming #7, 32 (inks over Steve Parkhouse) (1996-1999)
- Elvira's House of Mystery #3 (inks over Stan Woch) (1986)
- Falling in Love #106 (inks over Ric Estrada), #131 (inks over Mike Sekowsky) (1969–1972)
- Fanboy #6 (inks) (1999)
- The Flash (Elongated Man) #206, 208, 210, 212; (Kid Flash) #207, 209, 211, 216 (inks over Dick Dillin); (The Flash) #209–212, 215–216, 222–226 (inks over Irv Novick); (Green Lantern) #220–221, 223–224 (full art); #217–218, 226 (inks over Neal Adams), #227, 233–234 (inks over Dick Dillin) (1971–1973)
- The Flash Annual vol. 2 #10 (1997)
- Flash Special #1 (inks over Irv Novick) (1990)
- The Fury of Firestorm #61–63 (inks over Joe J. Brozowski) #Annual 4 (among other artists) (1986-1987)
- Gemini Blood #8–9 (inks over Tommy Lee Edwards) (1997)
- Green Arrow Vol 1 #1–4 (inks over Trevor Von Eeden) (1983)
- Green Arrow Vol 2 #1–6 (inks over Ed Hannigan), #7 (inks over Eduardo Barreto), #8 (inks over Paris Cullins), #9–12 (inks over Ed Hannigan), #13–14 (inks over Dan Jurgens), #15–16 (inks over Ed Hannigan), #17–18 (inks over Dan Jurgens), #19–20 (inks over Ed Hannigan), #21–24, 27–30 (inks over Dan Jurgens), #117 (inks over William Rosado), Annual #2 (1988–1997)
- Green Lantern #80–83, 86–87 (inks over Neal Adams), #94 (inks over Mike Grell), #123 (inks over Joe Staton), #176 (inks over Dave Gibbons) (1970–1984)
- Hawk and Dove vol 3 #20 (inks over Kevin Maguire), #25 (among other artists) (1991)
- Hawk and Dove vol 4 #1–5 (inks over Dean Zachary) (1997–1998)
- Hot Wheels #1–2 (inks over Alex Toth), #2–3, 5 (inks over Ric Estrada) (1970)
- House of Mystery #258 (inks over George Ruppert) (1978)
- House of Secrets #83 (inks over Bill Draut), #87 (inks over Dick Dillin) (1969–1970)
- Human Target Special #1 (inks over Rick Burchett) (1991)
- Huntress #1 (inks over Joe Staton) (1989)
- Infinity Inc. #24, Annual #1 (inks) (1985)
- Invasion #3 (inks over Bart Sears) (1989)
- The Invisibles #22–24 (inks over Steve Yeowell) (1996)
- JLA Showcase 80-Page Giant #1 (inks over Gordon Purcell) (2000)
- Joker #1 (inks over Irv Novick) (1975)
- Joker: Last Laugh Secret Files (inks over Peter Krause) (2001)
- Jonah Hex #11 (inks over Rich Buckler) (1978)
- Jonah Hex vol. 2 #51 (2010)
- Jonni Thunder a.k.a. Thunderbolt, miniseries, #1–4 (1985)
- Just Imagine Stan Lee and Dave Gibbons Creating Green Lantern (inks over Dave Gibbons) (2001)
- Justice League America #27 (inks over Ty Templeton), Annual 1 (inks over Bill Willingham) (1987-1989)
- Justice League of America #102–116 (inks over Dick Dillin), #193 (inks over Rich Buckler), #224 (inks over Chuck Patton) Annual #1 (inks over Rick Hoberg) (Wonder Woman/Zatanna) #200 (1972–1984)
- Justice League of America, vol. 4, #0 (one page only) (2006)
- Justice League Task Force #4 (inks over Gabriel Morrisette) (1993)
- Kobra #3 (inks over Keith Giffen) (1976)
- L.A.W., miniseries, #1–6 (1999–2000)
- League of Justice #1–2 (inks over Ed Hannigan (1996)
- Legends of the DC Universe #7–9 (inks over Greg Land) (1998)
- Legion of Super-Heroes #45 (inks) (1988)
- Lobo: A Contract on Gawd #1–4 (inks over Kieron Dwyer (1994)
- Lords of the Ultra-Realm Special #1 (inks over Pat Broderick) (1987)
- The Man of Steel, mini-series, #1–6 (inks over John Byrne) (1986)
- Modesty Blaise, graphic novel (1994)
- Mythos: The Final Tour #3 (inks) (1997)
- Nevada #5 (inks over Phil Winslade) (1998)
- Nightwing: Alfred's Return, one-shot (1995)
- New Gods #26 (inks over Rick Hoberg) (1991)
- The New Teen Titans vol. 1 #27 (inks over Ross Andru) vol. 2 Annual #4 (inks), (Tales of Tamaran) #16 (1983–1986)
- Power of Shazam #28; #29–36, 38–41 (inks over Peter Krause); #37 (inks over Mike Manley); #42–46, 1,000,000 (inks over Jerry Ordway) (1997–1999)
- Question #21 (inks over Denys Cowan) (1988)
- Robin #15 (inks over Tom Grummett) #30 (inks over Frank Fosco) (1995-1996)
- Sandman #27 (inks over Kelley Jones), #29 (inks over Stan Woch), #34 (inks over Colleen Doran), #47 (inks over Jill Thompson), #53 (inks over Michael Zulli), #56 (inks) (1991–1993)
- Scarlett #11 (inks over Jim Fern) (1993)
- Secret Hearts #133, 136 (inks over Win Mortimer), #142 (inks over Ric Estrada), #149 (inks over Alex Toth) (1969–1971)
- Secret Origins vol. 2 (Halo) #6, (Deadman, inks over Kevin Maguire) #15, (Batgirl, inks over Rick Leonardi) #20, (Legion of Super Heroes, inks over Rick Stasi) #25, (Green Arrow, inks over Hannibal King) #38, (Johnny Thunder, inks over Alan Weiss; Black Canary, inks over Joe Staton) #50, #Special (Two Face, inks over Pat Broderick), Annual #3 (inks) (1986–1990)
- Secret Origins of the World's Greatest Super-Heroes (Batman) (1989)
- Secrets of Sinister House #5 (inks over Mike Sekowsky) (1972)
- Shade, the Changing Man #53 (inks over Sean Phillips) (1994)
- Shadowdragon Annual #1 (1995)
- Shazam! #12, 25 (1974–1976)
- Showcase #82 (inks over Jerry Grandenetti), #88 (inks over Mike Sekowsky), #98–99 (inks over Joe Staton) (1969–1978)
- Showcase '93 #5–6 (inks over Kieron Dwyer) (1993)
- Showcase '94 #2–4 (inks over Patrick Rolo) (1994)
- Showcase '95 #9 (inks over Sal Velluto) (1995)
- Showcase '96 #12 (inks over Stuart Immonen) (1996)
- Silver Age: Showcase (Seven Soldiers of Victory) #1 (2000)
- Spiral Zone #1 (inks over Pablo Marcos), #2 (inks over Carmine Infantino), #3–4 (inks over Don Heck) (1988)
- Steel #33 (inks over Jim Aparo) (1996)
- Steel: The Official Comics Adaptation (inks over Jon Bogdanove) (1997)
- Strange Sports Stories #2–3 (full art); #1, 3 (inks over Curt Swan), #2, 4 (inks over Irv Novick) (1973–1974)
- Super DC Giant #26 (inks over Sal Amendola) (1971)
- Superboy #173 (inks over Bob Brown) (1971)
- Superboy & the Legion of Super-Heroes #246 (inks over Joe Staton) (1978)
- Supergirl (Zatanna) #1 (inks over John Rosenberger) (1972)
- Supergir Annual #1 (1996)
- Superman (Fabulous World of Krypton) #236, 255, 271 (full art); #257 (inks over Dick Dillin); (Superman) #240, 258, 273 (inks over Curt Swan) #358 (inks over Denys Cowan); #393 (inks over Irv Novick) (1971–1984)
- Superman vol. 2 #96 (inks over Dan Jurgens); #114 (inks); Annual #3 (inks over Dusty Abell) (1991–1996)
- Superman For the Animals (inks over Tom Grummett) (2000)
- Superman Forever one-shot (among other artists) (1998)
- Superman IV Movie Special (inks) (1987)
- Superman Meets the Quik Bunny (inks over Carmine Infantino) (1987)
- Superman's Girl Friend, Lois Lane (Rose and Thorn) #112, 115–116 (full art); #117–119 (inks over Rich Buckler) (1971–1972)
- Superman: The Man of Steel #51–53 (inks over Jon Bogdanove); #58 (inks) (1995–1996)
- Superman: The Wedding Album (1996)
- Swordquest #1–3 (inks over George Perez) (1982–1983)
- Tailgunner Jo #5 (inks over Tom Artis) (1988)
- Tales of the Teen Titans #42–44, 50, Annual #3 (inks over George Perez); #54 (inks over Rich Buckler) (1984–1985)
- Teen Titans vol. 2 #12 (inks over Gil Kane) (1997)
- Teen Titans Spotlight #1–2 (inks over Denys Cowan); #5 (inks over Ross Andru) (1986)
- Thriller #5–6 (inks over Trevor Von Eden) (1984)
- Time Warp #1, 3 (full art); #1 (inks over Rich Buckler) (1979–1980)
- Total Justice #1 (inks over Ramon Bernado); #2 (inks over Tom Morgan); #3 (inks over Denys Cowan) (1996)
- Transmetropolitan #3 (inks over Darick Robertson) (1997)
- Unknown Soldier #234 (inks over Howard Chaykin) (1979)
- V #17–18 (inks over Denys Cowan) (1986)
- Vertigo Rave (inks over Gary Amaro) (1994)
- Vigilante #1 (inks over Keith Pollard); #11 (inks over Ross Andru); #27 (inks over Denys Cowan) (1983–1986)
- War of the Gods #4 (inks over George Perez) (1991)
- Wild Dog #1–4 (inks over Terry Beatty) (1987)
- Witching Hour #2–3 (inks over Alex Toth); #5 (inks over Stanley Pitt); #6 (inks over Mike Sekowsky); #6 (inks over John Celardo) (1969)
- Who's Who in the DC Universe #4, 6, 9–10 (1990–1991)
- Who's Who: The Definitive Directory of the DC Universe #2, 10–11, 20 (1985–1986)
- Wonder Woman #178–194, 196 (inks over Mike Sekowsky); #199, 204 (inks over Don Heck); #241 (inks over Joe Staton); #300 (inks over Ross Andru); #200–203, 220, 300 (Note: In this issue, Giordano provided the art on two stories, one as inker only and the other as full artist) (full art) (1972–1983)
- Wonder Woman: The Secret of the Magic Thiara (inks over Rich Buckler) (book set and record, 1978)
- Wonder Woman Secret Files & Origins #1 (1998)
- World of Metropolis #1–4 (inks over Win Mortimer) (1988)
- World's Finest Comics #175–176 (inks over Neal Adams); #248 (inks over Mike Vosburg); #258 (inks over Jose Luis Garcia-Lopez); #259–261, 263–264, 267 (inks over Rich Buckler); #262 (inks over Joe Staton); #265 (inks over Ric Estrada)
- Young Love #52 (inks over Gene Colan); #122 (inks over John Tartaglione) (1965–1976)
- Young Romance #163–164 (inks over Alex Toth) (1969–1970)

=== Marvel Comics ===
- Battle #56 (1958)
- Battleground #20 (1957)
- The Avengers vol. 3 #24, 29 (inks over George Pérez) (2000)
- Bizarre Adventures #28 (inks over Larry Hama) (1981)
- Conan the Barbarian #48–51 (inks over John Buscema) (1975)
- Deadly Hands of Kung Fu (Sons of the Tiger) #1, 3 (1974)
- Doctor Strange #1–2, 4–5 (inks over Frank Brunner) (1974)
- Dracula Lives #1 (inks over Alan Weiss); #2 (inks over Gene Colan); #5–8, 10–11 (full art) (1974–1975)
- Howard the Duck #16 (1977)
- The Incredible Hulk, vol. 3, #24 (inks over John Romita Jr.) (2001)
- Legion of Monsters (Dracula) #1 (1975)
- Love Romances #53–54, 61, 64, 75–76, 86–92, 104, 106 (1955–1963)
- Love Tales #68–69 (1956)
- Lovers #83 (1957)
- Marvel Feature vol. 2 (Red Sonja) #1 (1975)
- Marvel Premiere #14 (inks over Frank Brunner); #15 (inks over Gil Kane); #16–19 (inks over Larry Hama) (1974)
- Marvel Team-Up vol. 2 #5 (inks over Tom Grindberg) (1998)
- Marvel Two-in-One #15 (inks over Arvell Jones) (1976)
- My Love #16 (inks over Gene Colan) (1972)
- My Own Romance #75–76 (1960)
- Mystery Tales #53 (1957)
- Nova #14 (inks over Sal Buscema) (1977)
- Savage Sword of Conan #25 (1977)
- Six-Gun Western #4 (1957)
- Spider-Man Team-Up #7 (inks over Sal Buscema) (1997)
- Spider-Man/Punisher: Family Plot #1 (1996)
- Stoker's Dracula #1–4 (2004–2005)
- Strange Tales #61 (full art); 172–173 (inks over Gene Colan) (1958–1974)
- Thor #231–232 (inks over John Buscema) (1975)
- Thor vol. 2 #18, 23–25 (inks over John Romita Jr.) (1999–2000)
- Two Gun Western #11 (1957)
- Unknown Worlds of Science Fiction #4 (1975)
- Untold Tales of Spider-Man #16 (inks over Pat Olliffe) (1996)
- Vampire Tales #5 (inks over Alan Kupperberg) (1974)
- Western Trails #1 (1957)
- World of Fantasy #14 (1958)
- Worlds Unknown #4 (inks over John Buscema) (1973)

=== Valiant Comics ===
- Bloodshot #0 (inks over Kevin Vanhook); #27–29, 32–33, 38–39 (inks over Sean Chan) (1994–1995)
- Dr. Tomorrow #6 (full art); #5 (inks over Kevin Kobasic)
- Ninjak #0, #00 (inks over Mark A. Moretti); #19 (inks over Mike Manley) (1995)
- Psi Lords #1–3, 5–7 (inks over Michael Leeke); #6 (inks over David Wong) (1994–1995)
- Solar, Man of the Atom #46–50 (inks over Dan Jurgens); #51–54 (inks over Tom Grindberg); #55–56, 59 (inks over Aaron Lopresti) (1995–1996)
- Visitor Vs. the Valiant Universe #1–2 (inks over Bryan Hitch) (1995)

=== Warren Publishing ===
- Creepy #94 (full art); #84, 87, 93, 98 (inks over Carmine Infantino) (1976–1978)
- Eerie #88 (full art); #81, 83 (inks over Carmine Infantino) (1977)
- Vampirella #57–58, 62 (inks over Carmine Infantino) (1977)

=== Other publishers ===
- Star Reach #2 (Star Reach, 1975)
- Cadillacs and Dinosaurs #1–3 (Topps, 1994)

=== Books ===
- Drawing Comics with Dick Giordano (F+W Publications Inc., 2005)

Preceded by George Kashdan	Aquaman editor 1968–1971	Succeeded by Paul Levitz (in 1977)
Preceded by George Kashdan	Teen Titans editor 1968–1971	Succeeded by Murray Boltinoff
Preceded by Paul Levitz	Batman editor 1981–1982	Succeeded by Len Wein
Preceded by Paul Levitz	The Brave and the Bold editor 1981–1982	Succeeded by Len Wein
Preceded by Paul Levitz	Detective Comics editor 1981–1982	Succeeded by Len Wein
Preceded by Kurt Schaffenberger	Action Comics inker 1987	Succeeded by Keith Williams
Preceded by Joe Orlando	DC Universe Executive Editor; 1983–1993	Succeeded by Mike Carlin
