= Five Brushstrokes =

Five Brushstrokes may refer to

- Five Brushstrokes (Lichtenstein, New Orleans), a sculpture by Roy Lichtenstein installed at the entrance of the New Orleans Museum of Art
- Five Brushstrokes (Lichtenstein, Indianapolis), a sculptural series by Roy Lichtenstein installed at the entrance of the Indianapolis Museum of Art
