= Brushstrokes =

Painting by Roy Lichtenstein

- Artist: Roy Lichtenstein
- Year: 1965
- Medium: Oil and Magna on canvas
- Movement: Pop art
- Dimensions: 122.5 cm × 122.5 cm (48.25 in × 48.25 in)
- Location: Private collection

Brushstrokes is a 1965 oil and Magna on canvas pop art painting by Roy Lichtenstein. It is the first element of the Brushstrokes series of artworks that includes several paintings and sculptures. As with all of his Brushstrokes works, it is in part a satirical response to the gestural painting of Abstract Expressionism.

== Background ==
The source for the entire Brushstrokes series was Charlton Comics' Strange Suspense Stories "The Painting" #72 (October 1964) by Dick Giordano.

Prior to producing his first Brushstrokes work, Lichtenstein spun his upcoming work as a "satirical send-up of Abstract Expressionism" by saying: "I'm thinking now of doing something on Abstract Expressionism...The problem there will be to paint a brush stroke, a picture of a brush stroke...Purposely dripped paint and things, you know, where the drips are actually drawn drips that look like drops of water drawn by a commercial artist."

Despite the initial objective of parodying Abstract expressionism, the source for the first Brushstrokes work was a comic strip. Measuring 122.5 cm × 122.5 cm (48.25 in × 48.25 in), Brushstrokes was the first element of the Brushstrokes series. The source for the entire Brushstrokes series was Charlton Comics' Strange Suspense Stories 72 (October 1964) by Dick Giordano. According to the Lichtenstein Foundation, in addition to this painting named Brushstrokes, there are also both a sculpture and a screenprint by the same name. There is also "Brushstrokes 1970". The Lichtenstein Foundation website also notes that he began creating the Brushstrokes painting in the autumn of 1965 and presented the Brushstroke series at Castelli's gallery from November 20 through December 11.

== Detail ==
As with many comics-based works, the connection to the source is evident in Brushstrokes. This work depicts a cropped derivation of the source image. In Brushstrokes, as in its source, a hand holds a house painter's paintbrush in the lower left hand corner of the image, while in the upper right a few strokes of paint as well as spatterings of paint are presented. Lichtenstein selected this source because he "...liked the summary rendering of the hand holding the brush and the way in which the cartoonist indicated paint". The three strokes in the upper right are the dominant imagery, while the partial view of the hand in the lower left limited by the edges of the canvas shows paint dripping from the brush. This is an example of Lichtenstein humorously presenting a subject that might be crowded out in a newspaper via a parody that relies on the difference between art and the rest of the world.

== See also ==
- 1965 in art
