= Brushstrokes (sculpture) =

Sculpture by Roy Lichtenstein in Portland, Oregon, U.S.

Coordinates: 45°31′00″N 122°40′59″W

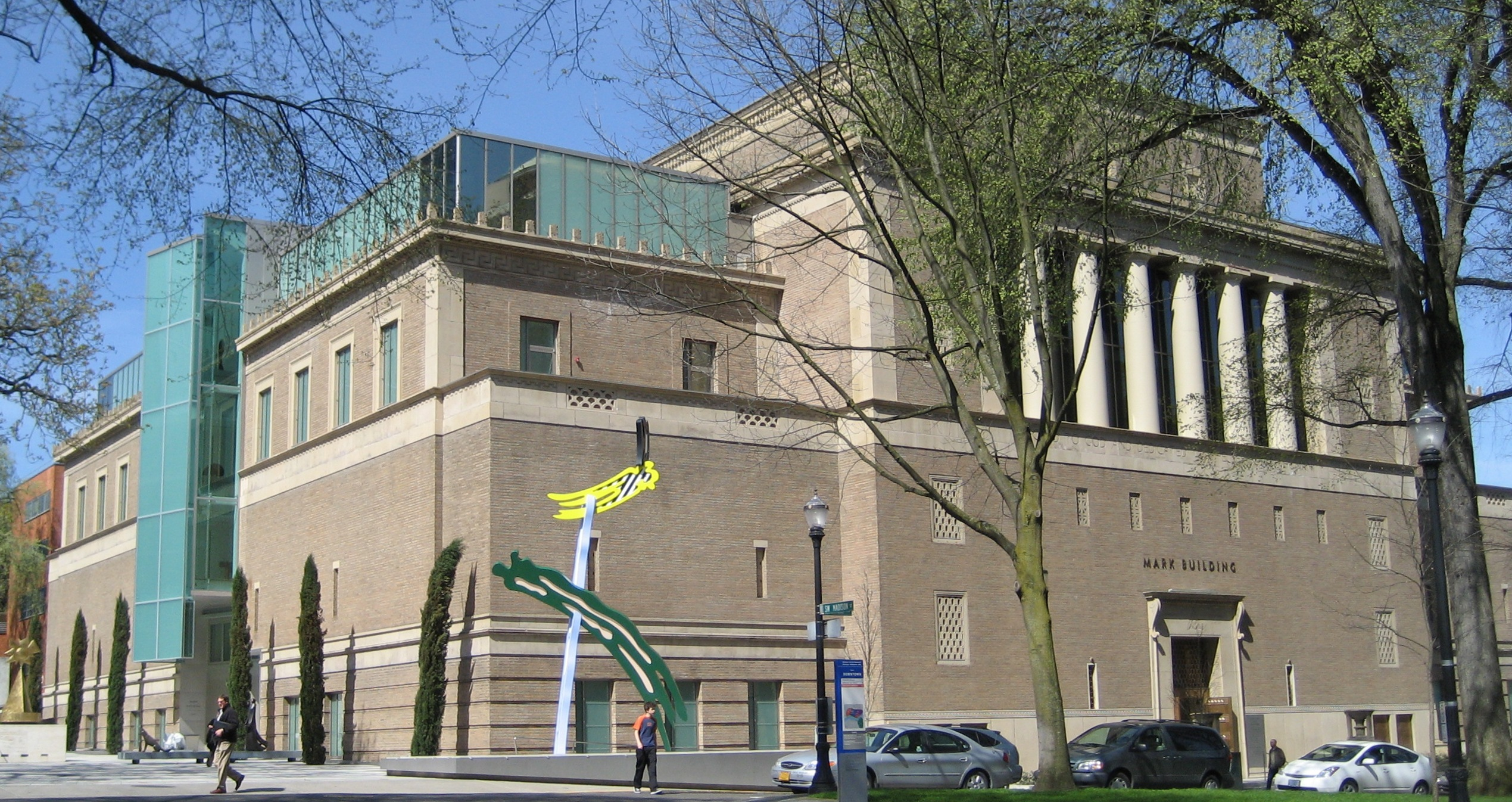
- Brushstrokes in front of the Portland Art Museum's Mark Building in 2007
- Artist: Roy Lichtenstein
- Year: 1996
- Type: Sculpture
- Dimensions: 8.973 m × 4.1 m × 2.3 m (353.25 in × 162 in × 90 in)
- Location: Portland Art Museum; Portland, Oregon

Brushstrokes is a 1996 sculpture by Roy Lichtenstein, installed outside the Portland Art Museum's Mark Building, in Portland, Oregon. It is part of the Brushstrokes series of artworks that includes several paintings and sculptures whose subject is the actions made with a house-painter's brush.

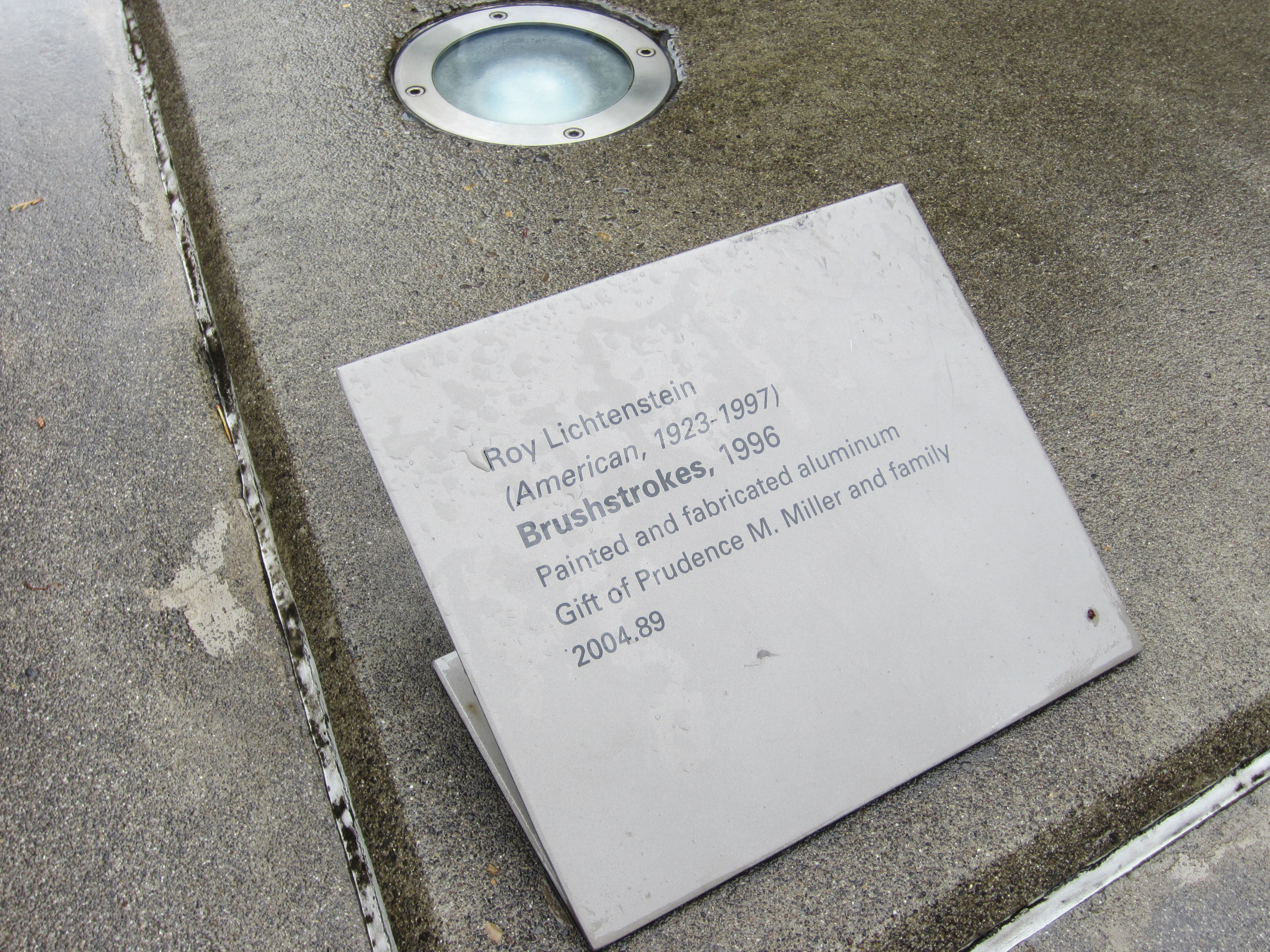
Plaque

== See also ==
- 1996 in art
