= Sal Amendola =

Italian American artist

- Born: March 8, 1948 (age 78) Cosenza, Italy
- Areas: Writer, Penciller, Inker, Editor, Letterer, Colourist

Sal Amendola (born 1948) is an Italian American comics artist and teacher primarily known for his association with DC Comics.

== Career ==
Amendola artwork from Detective Comics #439 (Feb.–March 1974). Inks by Dick Giordano

Sal Amendola graduated from the School of Visual Arts in 1969 with the school's then-offered three-year certificate. He eventually returned, with Robert McGinnis as his thesis adviser, to earn his MFA in illustration.

Amendola started his comics career in 1969, drawing stories for editor Dick Giordano's The Witching Hour, and becoming Giordano's assistant editor in 1970. At DC, Amendola worked in the production department, where he did coloring, inking, lettering, and page headings. He provided artwork on such features as "Green Arrow" in Action Comics and "John Carter, Warlord of Mars" in Weird Worlds. He drew spot illustrations for an Aquaman text story in Super DC Giant #S-26 (July–August 1971).

Amendola left DC for Marvel Comics in 1972, where, as an associate editor, he worked on letters pages, coloring, and backgrounds. Unhappy at Marvel, Amendola soon returned to DC. He plotted and pencilled the Batman story "Night of the Stalker!" based on an idea by Neal Adams, but the story was rejected by Batman editor Julius Schwartz. Several years later, Schwartz was succeeded by Archie Goodwin, who asked Amendola to show him the story, and accepted it. It was finally published in Detective Comics #439 (Feb.–March 1974), with dialogue and captions by Steve Englehart, and inks by Dick Giordano. It is considered one of the greatest Batman short stories ever.

In 1976, Amendola was part of the Crusty Bunkers, a group of comic book inkers who assisted Neal Adams on various projects.

Amendola eventually became an editor and talent coordinator at DC, where he stayed until 1986. He edited the New Talent Showcase and Elvira's House of Mystery titles. He inked Curt Swan's pencils on the comic book adaptation of Superman III in 1983 and was one of the artists on World's Finest Comics #300 (Feb. 1984).

In the mid–1970s, Amendola wrote and drew for Archie Comics and did storyboard art for movies. He began teaching at New York's School of Visual Arts in 1974, and later at the Joe Kubert School of Cartoon and Graphic Art. In 1988, he joined the faculty of the Fashion Institute of Technology.

== Bibliography ==
Amendola's comics work (interior art) includes:

=== Archie Comics ===
- Archie & Friends Double Digest Magazine #15 (2012)
- Archie Double Digest #237, 243, 271 (2013–2016)
- Archie's Double Digest Magazine #111 (1999)
- B&V Friends Double Digest Magazine #237 (2014)
- Everything's Archie #53 (1976)
- Jughead and Archie Double Digest #6 (2014)
- Jughead's Double Digest #199 (2014)
- Mad House #96 (1974)
- World of Archie Double Digest #15, 22, 55 (2012–2016)
- Laugh #300 “Ski-cart Catastrophe” (1975) (Note: Source, Sal Amendola ledger, 1975 - 1983. Dates in parentheses indicate when artwork was completed, not necessarily publishing dates.)
- Pep #312 Dilton in “Switch Hitter” (1975)
- Laugh #304 Archie in “The Promise” (1976)
- Mad House “Jungle Jangle” (1976)
- Laugh #303 Archie in: “Lost and Found” (1976)
- Archie and the Gang Presents: “Childhood Snaps” (1976)
- Reggie and Me in: “No Contest” (1976)
- Laugh #310 Betty and Me in: “Freebie Jeebies” (1976)
- Archie and Jughead in: “Tweet Heat” (1976)
- Laugh #306 Betty and Veronica in: “A Fella for Cinderella” (1976)
- Laugh #305 Archie in: “Anything to Help” (1976)
- Pep #317 Archie in: “The Great Deal” (1976)
- Laugh #310 Reggie in: “Once Upon a Time” (1976)
- Laugh #306 Archie in: “All Worked Out” (1976)
- Laugh # 310 Archie in: “The Allergy” (1976)
- Archie in: “Another Man’s Shoes” (1976)
- Pep #317 Archie in: “Extra Special Evening” (1976)
- Mad House Mad House Presents: “Colonial Calamity” (1976)
- Mad House Mad House Presents: “Still More Wasted T.V. Commercials” (1976)
- Mad House “Professor Transistor Presents: The Discovery of the Mouth” (1976)
- Archie’s Pals and Gals #110 Dec. Chuck in: “The Fishy Facts” [pencil and inks by Amendola, one panel inked by Jack Abel]
- Archie in: “The Collection” (1976)
- Archie in: “Hairpiece Hassles” (1976)
- Pep #321 Archie in: “Partners” (1976)
- Pep #342 Archie in: “The Specialty” (1976) [written by Jim Ruth and Amendola, pencilled and inked by Amendola]
- Archie in: “The Last Ride” (1976)
- Archie and the Gang in: “Soccer Rocker” (1976)
- Pep #327 Archie in: “The Part Owner Partnership” (1976)
- Everything’s Archie #73 Archie in: “Try This One” (1976)
- Archie in: “Slave Trade” (1976)
- Archie’s Pals and Gals #113 Chuck in: “Minority Gripe” (1976)
- Everything’s Archie #71 Archie in: “Coach Reproach”
- Everything’s Archie #63 Archie in: “Big Fuss”
- Pep #325 Archie in: “Busy Bee”
- Archie’s Pals and Gals #120 Archie in: “Just Like That” (1976)
- Pep #332 Archie in: “To Be or Not” (1976)
- Everything’s Archie #63 Archie in: “Special Date” (1976)
- Archie and Me in: “Slave Knave” (1976)
- Archie and Me in: “Surprise Prize” (1976)
- Chuck in: “Training Session” (1976)
- Archie’s Pals and Gals #113 Betty and Me in: “Inflation Jubilation” (1976)
- Pep #333 Archie in: “English Lesson” (1976)
- Archie in: “The Latest Thing” (1976)
- Archie in: “The Hunt” (1976)
- Archie’s Pals And Gals #117 Archie in: “Double Trouble” (1977)
- Pep #333 Archie in: “One Day Last Summer” (1976)
- Archie in: “Determined Man” (1976)
- Archie in: “Giving In” (1976)
- Archie’s pals and Gals #119 Archie in: “Too Good to Be True” (1976)
- Pep #327 Archie in: “What Did You Bring?” (1976)
- Archie’s Pals and Gals #128 Dec. 78 Archie in: “The Other One” (1977)
- Mad House #110 Mad House Presents: “Transistor Mister” (1977)
- Archie’s Pals and Gals #119 Archie in: “Zoo Stew” (1977)
- Everything’s Archie #70 Archie in: “Very Impractical” (1977)
- Everything’s Archie #66 Jul. 78 Archie in: “The Substitute” (1977)
- Archie’s Pals and Gals #135 Archie in: “Popular Choice” (1977)
- Everything’s Archie #68 Archie in: “The Foul Ball” (1977)
- Betty in: “Common Cause” (1987) [written and penciled by Amendola]
- Everything’s Archie #134, Mar. Archie in: “Twin Turmoil” (1987)
- Archie in: “Mood Food” (1987)

=== Atlas/Seaboard Comics ===
- Phoenix #1–3 (1975)

=== DC Comics ===
- Action Comics (Green Arrow) #421 (1973)
- Adventure Comics (Doctor Mid-Nite) (Note: Amendola inked an unfinished story from the Golden Age of Comics.) #418 (1972)
- Batman #296 (1978)
- Detective Comics (Batman) #439–440 (1974)
- Elvira's House of Mystery #4 (one-page foreword) (1986)
- Forbidden Tales of Dark Mansion #14 (one-page foreword) (1974)
- Heroes Against Hunger #1 (two-page story, among other artists) (1986)
- House of Mystery #200 (one-page story with Joe Orlando) (1972)
- Star Trek #5–6 (1984)
- Super DC Giant #S–26 (Aquaman) (1971)
- Superman ("Map of Krypton", two-page illustration) #239 (1971)
- Superman III The Official Adaptation of the Movie! #1 (inks over Curt Swan) (1983)
- Superman's Pal Jimmy Olsen #153 (three-page story) (1972)
- Weird Worlds #4–7 (1973)
- Who's Who: The Definitive Directory of the DC Universe (Johnny Cloud character profile, one page) #11 (1986)
- The Witching Hour #27 (1973)
- World's Finest Comics (Black Canary and Green Arrow) #247; (Superman and Batman) #298, 300 (1977–1984)

=== Other publications ===
- Tarzan of the Apes/The Return of Tarzan by Edgar Rice Burroughs (2012), full color cover, black & white interiors
- A Pack of Trouble by James Gauthier (2011), full color cover, black & white interiors
- Witnessed, the True Story of the Brooklyn Bridge UFO Abductions by Budd Hopkins (1996) selected interior artwork
- Left at East Gate by Larry Warren and Peter Robbins (1997) cover illustration
- Streetwise edited by Jon B. Cooke and John Morrow, TwoMorrows Publishing; entry: “My Heroes Have Always Been Super”, written, pencilled, inked by Amendola
- Leonard Starr’s Mary Perkins On Stage volume seven, Classic Comics Press (2010); Introduction
- Draw Comics with Dick Giordano (2005) Impact Books; Perspective drawing pages
- The Illustrated Comic Art Workshop (1982) the pages on perspective, and some pages on figure drawing and hands

== Notes ==
Preceded by Jim Aparo	Detective Comics penciller 1974	Succeeded by Howard Chaykin
Preceded by Karen Berger	New Talent Showcase editor 1985	Succeeded by n/a
Preceded by n/a	Elvira's House of Mystery editor 1986	Succeeded by Ed Hannigan
