= Brushstrokes series =

Painting series by Roy Lichtenstein

Brushstrokes (1965) was the first element of the Brushstrokes series.

Brushstrokes series is the name for a series of paintings produced in 1965–1966 by Roy Lichtenstein. It also refers to derivative sculptural representations of these paintings that were first made in the 1980s. In the series, the theme is art as a subject, but rather than reproduce masterpieces as he had starting in 1962, Lichtenstein depicted the gestural expressions of the painting brushstroke itself. The works in this series are linked to those produced by artists who use the gestural painting style of abstract expressionism made famous by Jackson Pollock, but differ from them due to their mechanically produced appearance. The series is considered a satire or parody of gestural painting by both Lichtenstein and his critics. After 1966, Lichtenstein incorporated this series into later motifs and themes of his work.

== Background ==
The source for the entire Brushstrokes series was Charlton Comics' Strange Suspense Stories "The Painting" #72 (October 1964) by Dick Giordano.

In the early 1960s, Lichtenstein reproduced masterpieces by Cézanne, Mondrian and Picasso before embarking on the Brushstrokes series in 1965. The Brushstrokes were contemporaneous with abstract painting that no longer emphasized the gestural aspect, with non-demonstrative modes carrying the day. Lichtenstein was identified with some such modes by critics and found himself linked to both Frank Stella and Kenneth Noland. Brushstrokes was the first element of the Brushstrokes series.

Prior to producing his first Brushstroke work, Lichtenstein spun his upcoming work as a satire of abstract expressionism. He stated that he intended to draw drips of paint and depictions of brushstrokes. Years after the series was completed, Lichtenstein claimed the source for the series was Renaissance artist Frans Hals, a painterly artist whose brushstrokes descended from hallowed examples of European art as an inspiration to abstract expressionism.

According to the Lichtenstein Foundation's website, he began creating Brushstroke painting in the autumn of 1965 and presented the Brushstroke series at Castelli's gallery from November 20 through December 11. A 1967 painting entitles Brushstrokes was produced for the Pasadena Art Museum's 1967 Lichtenstein exhibition. Later he produced an eight-print Brushstroke Figures series using collage elements. The series is described as an "instance of Abstract Expressionism recycled through conventions taken from the mass media." He began making sculptural renditions of his Brushstrokes paintings in the early 1980s in a wide variety of shapes and sizes. Many of these were painted bronzes.

The inspiration for the series was Charlton Comics' Strange Suspense Stories 72 (October 1964) by Dick Giordano which depicted an artist who was worn out emotionally after completing a painting. However, only the original directly references the comic strip. Although the Brushstrokes series had a brief timespan, the motif served as a theme in Lichtenstein's works for the final 32 years of his career.

In the 1960s, Lichtenstein characterized his inspiration as follows: "Although I had played with this idea before, it started with a comic book image of a mad artist crossing out, with a large brushstroke 'X,' the face of a friend that was haunting him. ... Then I went on to do paintings of brushstroke alone. I was very interested in characterizing or caricaturing a brushstroke." He has also described this series as follows: "[I]t's taking something that originally was suppose [sic] to mean immediacy and I'm tediously drawing something that looks like a brushstroke. ... I want it to look as though it were painstaking." In the 1990s, he described his inspiration in more artistic terms

It [the Brushstroke] was the way of portraying this romantic and bravura symbol in its opposite style, classicism. The Brushstroke plays a big part in the history of art. Brushstroke almost means painting or art. I did isolated Brushstrokes in 1965 and used cartoon brushstrokes to depict subject matters in the 1980s. I also did Brushstroke sculptures in bronze and wood to make them more palpable. ... the Brushstroke, it is just an idea to start with, and painting it makes it more concrete, but when you do it in bronze sculpture, it becomes real and has weight and is absurd, contradictory and funny.

— Sources,

Lichtenstein has also described the effect of depicting a single artificial brushstroke sculpturally with hundreds of small brushstrokes: "My recent sculpture of a Brushstroke is an attempt to give strong form to something that is a momentary occurrence, to solidify something ephemeral, to make it concrete."

In 1981, Lichtenstein return to the brushstroke and introduced complexity to the simple element of the painter's brushstroke and added free hand strokes to his "decoy ones".

== Details ==
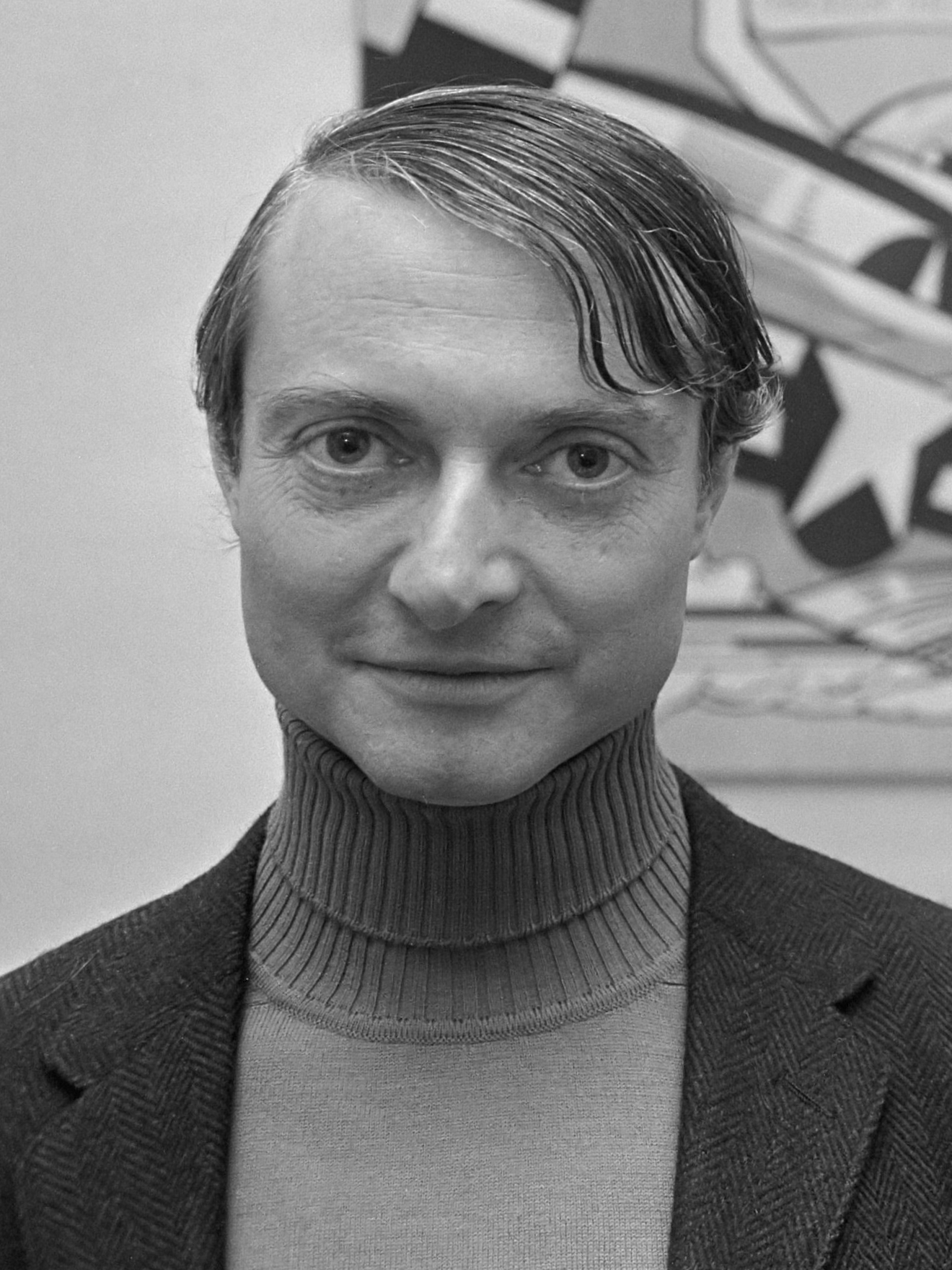
Lichtenstein in 1967

Works in the Brushstrokes series depict brushstrokes as their subject. However, rather than present the use of the delicate artist paint brush, Lichtenstein created the strokes of the broad house-painter's brush. His works both turned a mundane household task into a planned artistic operation and made a time-consuming task appear as if it were produced mechanically in an instant. The Brushstroke series paintings "contain the clear outline, process colors, and Benday-dot screen of the comic strip, but like the landscapes, they exchew narrative in favor of reducing a subject (in this case, painting) to its most basic symbol (the brushstroke)." The satirical element of the Brushstroke is obvious to many because it is a calculated presentation of the spontaneous gestural works of its day.

Although both the Cubists and the Futurists conveyed movement and speed within the two dimensions of a painting, it was Pollock who brought dynamic movement to the canvas in the 1950s with his form of abstract expressionism known as gestural painting in works such as Autumn Rhythm, 1950. In Little Big Painting and subsequently even more so in Big Painting No. 6 and Yellow and Green Brushstrokes, for example, dynamic activity was a prominent feature of the series. Lichtenstein's loops and depiction of sweeping gestures all resemble Pollock's gestural painting. As a result of this series, Lichtenstein was able to present works to the viewing audience that resembled what they had become accustomed to seeing, however, his result is completely flat without any trace of the brushstroke or the artist's hand. Meanwhile, the work references mechanical printing with the Ben Day dots background, which enables Lichtenstein to parody his predecessors and make a "powerful abstract composition". The effort to make the painting appear mechanically produced by flattening the brushstroke also gives the illusion that the brushstroke is floating freely.

The works in the series are considered ironic mechanical representations of gestural techniques. They depict the brushstroke directionality beginning with the full beginning, gradual fraying and ragged ending laid out over a field of Ben Day dots. Additionally, the series is an expression of the dealings of commercial art with its remote interaction. The significance of Lichtenstein's choice of the brushstroke as a subject is expressed by analogy: "the Ben-Day dots are to the painting of Lichtenstein what the brushstroke is to Abstract Expressionism: an image of process." The brushstroke remained a part of his works for the remainder of his career. He produced painted bronze sculptural versions of his brushstrokes throughout his career.

In 2001 a large show of his work from his estate entitled "Brushstrokes: Four Decades" was held in New York City at the Mitchell-Innes and Nash gallery. Prominent public works from the series include the Five Brushstrokes sculpture in the fountain in front of the main entrance of the New Orleans Museum of Art and the Five Brushstrokes sculptural series on the lawn in front of the main building of the Indianapolis Museum of Art.

== Critical response ==
Brushstroke (1996) is sculptural part of the series.

According to Diane Waldman of ARTnews, the works "spoofed the bravura brushstroke, replete with drips, of the Abstract Expressionists. Issues of vital importance to them, such as gesture and the involvement of the whole body in the act of painting, were reduced to a single brushstroke." She interprets this as a criticism of the corruption of Abstract Expressionism by uncreative painters. Though not described as abstract art, the brushstrokes forms are considered to be invented. The series was part of Lichtenstein's 1960s slant towards reductive, economical work.

The works in this series are regarded as having "dense abstract complexity" to blur the clarity of his earlier references while emphasizing "the bravura of the brushstroke" rather than the subject that it is used to depict. The use of the artist's paintbrush to create enormous renditions of house-painter brushstrokes in the quasi-mechanical Lichtenstein style is a commentary on his own painting actions. The series was a response to the Pop Art critics of the day, who were mostly abstract expressionist. He expropriated the most basic element of expressionism in his own style both in painting and in sculpture. The series of Brushstroke canvases is regarded as a group of works that parody gestural painting by commenting on the normal individual relationship between the artist and his tools.
