= Space Adventures (comics) =

American comic book series

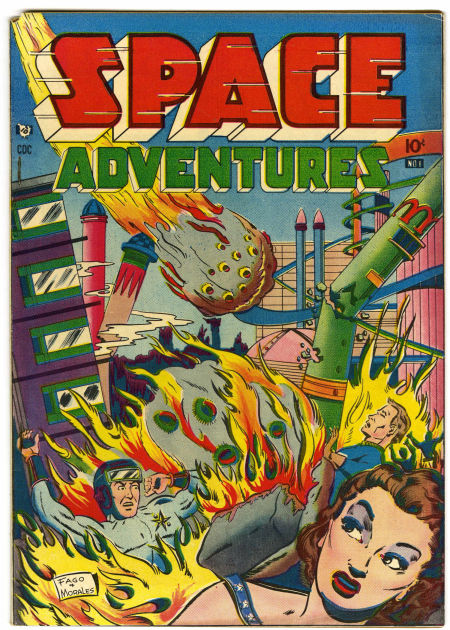
- Issue #1 (July 1952)

Publication information
- Publisher: Charlton Comics
- Schedule: Several runs spread throughout the years.
- Format: Ongoing series
- Genre: Science fiction
- Publication date: July 1952 – March 1979
- No. of issues: 70 plus one-shot spin-off.

Space Adventures (sometimes cover-titled Science Fiction Space Adventures, Space Adventures Presents Rocky Jones and other variations for particular issues) is an American science-fiction anthology comic book series that was published sporadically by Charlton Comics from 1952 to 1979. Its initial iteration included some of the earliest work of industry notables Steve Ditko, Dick Giordano, and Tony Tallarico, and at least one story by EC Comics mainstay Bernard Krigstein.

In 1960, a second iteration introduced the superhero Captain Atom by writer Joe Gill and artist Ditko, shortly prior to Ditko's work on Spider-Man for Marvel Comics.

== Publication history ==
=== First series ===
Space Adventures, a science-fiction anthology comic book from the Derby, Connecticut-based Charlton Comics, was initially published for 21 issues (cover-dated July 1952 - Aug. 1956). Issues #9-12 (Winter 1954 - Aug. 1954) were cover-titled Science Fiction Space Adventures. The following two issues were cover-billed Space Adventures Presents The Blue Beetle, and featured reprints of the defunct publisher Fox Comics' superhero, from 1939. Issues #15-18 (March-Sept. 1955) carried the rubric Space Adventures Presents Rocky Jones, and featured that children's television character in licensed TV spin-off stories. These were primarily illustrated by penciler Ted Galindo and inked by, variously, Dick Giordano, Ray Osrin, or Galindo himself. Giordano penciled at least one "Rocky Jones" story, "Gravity-Plus", inked by Jon D'Agostino, in issue #18. Issues #19 and #21 reverted to Space Adventures, interspersed with another licensed tie-in, Space Adventures Presents First Trip to the Moon — a retitled reprint of writer Otto Binder, penciler Dick Rockwell and inker Sam Burlockoff's adaptation of the movie Destination Moon, from Fawcett Comics' 1950 one-shot of that name.

Space Adventures #10-11 (Spring-June 1954) contained two of Steve Ditko's first half-dozen comic-book covers. Issue #16 (May 1955) features a six-page story, "Jealousy on Kano", by artist Bernard Krigstein, one of EC Comics' acclaimed creators in one of his small handful of non-EC stories during that publisher's 1954-55 heyday.

=== Second series ===
The numbering for Space Adventures was taken over by the Charlton war comics series War at Sea, which ran from #22-42 (cover-dated Nov. 1957 - June 1961). Space Adventures began again with issue #23, skipping the number #22, after taking over the numbering of the Charlton version of the former Fawcett series Nyoka the Jungle Girl.

This second series ran 37 issues (#23-59, May 1958 - Nov. 1964). The first issue only was cover-titled Space Adventures Presents Space Trip to the Moon and contained a second reprinting of Fawcett's 1950s movie adaptation Destination Moon, this time with the first page deleted. Subsequent issues showcased much work by artist Steve Ditko, and at least one story by EC Comics veteran John Severin, as well as by such Charlton Comics regulars as Vince Alascia, Rocke Mastroserio, Charles Nicholas, and Sal Trapani.

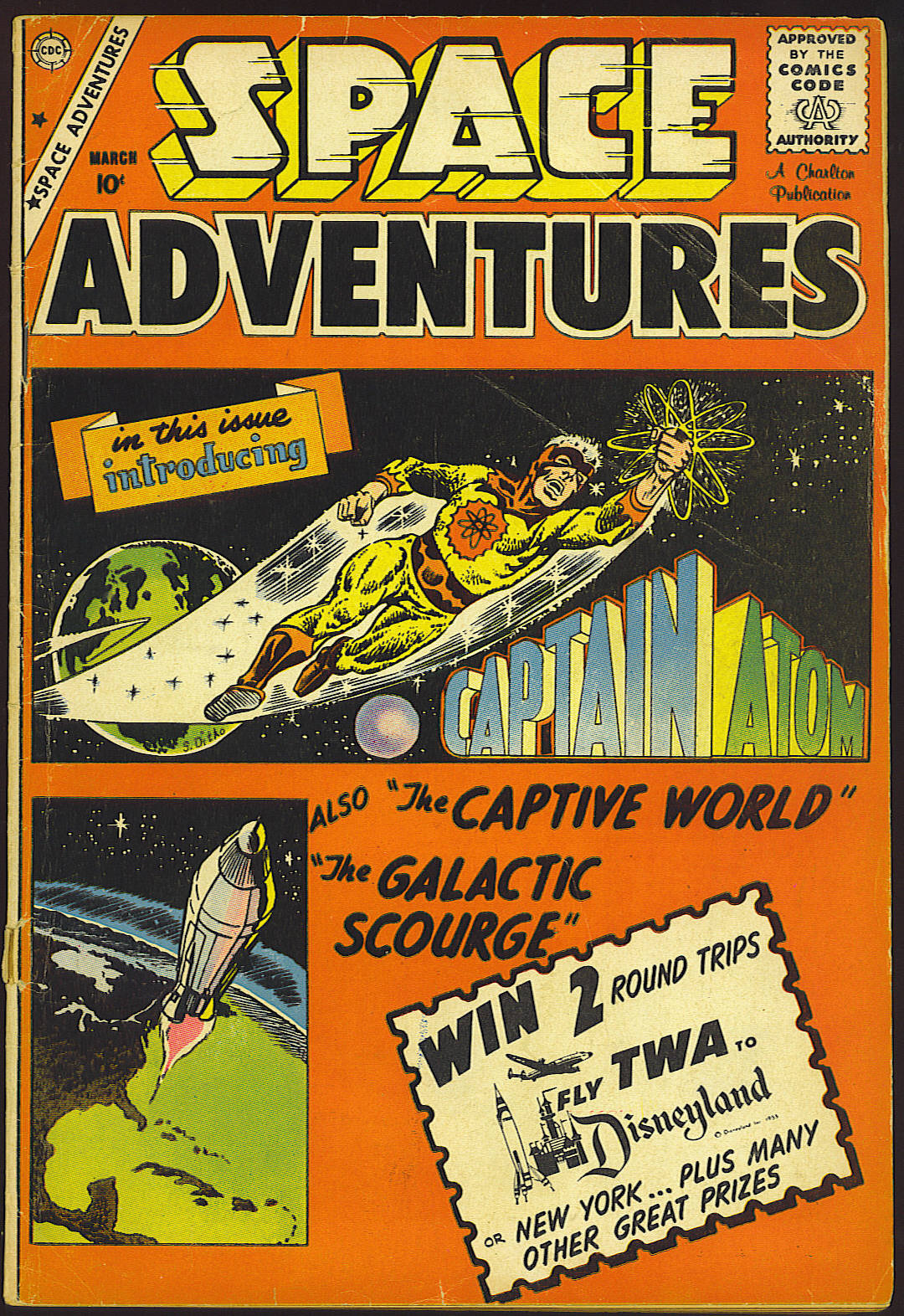
Space Adventures #33 (March 1960), the debut of Captain Atom, cover art by Steve Ditko.

Writer Joe Gill and artist Ditko introduced the space-age superhero Captain Atom in a nine-page story in issue #33 (March 1960). The character starred through issue #42 (Oct. 1961), except for skipping #41, with all stories drawn by Ditko except for two of the three in that final issue. The character would return later in the decade, and eventually be sold to DC Comics after Charlton's 1980s bankruptcy; the version continues as a DC superhero as of 2010.

Space Adventures, which had continued all through the superhero's run to include anthological science-fiction stories, reverted to all-anthology for issues 43-59 (Dec. 1961 - Nov. 1964) — all without Ditko, who by now freelanced exclusively for at Marvel Comics, where from 1956 he had become an established presence on that company's science fiction/fantasy comics, and would, in 1963, co-create the popular superhero Spider-Man.

=== One-shot publication ===
The title returned as a one-shot science-fiction anthology that continued the old series numbering and was published as Space Adventures Presents U.F.O. issue #60 (Oct. 1967). This featured early work by such later notables as writer Denny O'Neil (using the pseudonym Sergius O'Shaughnessy), and artists Jim Aparo and Pat Boyette.

=== Third series ===
The next version began again with an issue #2, with Charlton considering the previous one-shot as the first issue of a relaunch. Space Adventures vol. 2, #2-8 (July 1968 - July 1969) featured work by writer O'Neil (again as O'Shaughnessy), and artists Alascia, Aparo, Boyette, Mastroserio, Nicholas, and a returning Steve Ditko who by now had left Marvel Comics and was concurrently freelancing for both Charlton and DC Comics. Artists Sanho Kim and Sam Glanzman each contributed at least one story.

The series returned for five reprint issues, #9-13 (May 1978 - March 1979), the first four of which were all-Ditko reprints of, primarily, Captain Atom stories. The final issue reprinted Charlton's Outer Space vol. 2, #1 (Nov. 1968), featuring Ditko and other artists.

== Other publishers ==
The British publisher L. Miller & Son reprinted an uncertain number of stories/issues in the U.K. in the 1950s.
