= Five Brushstrokes (Lichtenstein, New Orleans) =

Sculpture by Roy Lichtenstein

Five Brushstrokes is a 1984 sculpture from the Brushstrokes series by Roy Lichtenstein that was fabricated in 2010 and acquired by the New Orleans Museum of Art in 2013. It was installed in a fountain at the entrance of the museum in City Park. The painted and fabricated aluminum sculpture is a gift of Sydney and Walda Besthoff and Partial Gift of the Roy Lichtenstein Foundation.

== See also ==
- 1984 in art
