= Five Brushstrokes (Lichtenstein, Indianapolis) =

Sculpture series by Roy Lichtenstein

Five Brushstrokes is a 1983–84 sculpture series from the Brushstrokes series by Roy Lichtenstein that was fabricated in 2012 and acquired by the Indianapolis Museum of Art in 2013. It was installed in front of the entrance of the main building of the museum. The painted and fabricated aluminum and steel sculptural series is a gift of the Robert L. and Marjorie J. Mann Fund and partial gift of the Roy Lichtenstein Foundation. The first showing of Element E of the series was displayed in the rotunda of the Tweed Courthouse in 2003 as part of a Lower Manhattan public art exhibit.
