= Captain Atom =

DC Comics character

- The Nathaniel Adam incarnation of Captain Atom as depicted in Secret Origins #34 (December 1988), art by Ty Templeton and Jerry Ordway.

Publication information
- Publisher: Original: Charlton Comics; Current: DC Comics
- First appearance: Allen; Space Adventures #33 (March 1960); Nathaniel; Captain Atom vol. 2 #1 (March 1987)
- Created by: Allen; Joe Gill (writer); Steve Ditko (artist); Nathaniel; Cary Bates (writer); Pat Broderick (artist)

In-story information
- Full name: Nathaniel Christopher "Nate" Adam
- Team affiliations: (Both); United States Air Force (Nathaniel); Justice League International; L.A.W. Justice League; Extreme Justice; Justice League Europe; Justice League Task Force; United States Army
- Partnerships: (Nathaniel); Nightshade; Plastique; Forerunner
- Notable aliases: (Nathaniel); Cameron Scott, Monarch
- Abilities: (Allen): Superhuman strength, speed, stamina, and reflexes; Anti-magic; Time manipulation; Time travel; Teleportation; Atomic manipulation; Atomic transmutation; Quantum field manipulation; Fundamental-forces control; Energy projection; Energy absorption; Reality alteration; Flight; Immortality; Invulnerability; Matter manipulation; Matter generation; Matter absorption; Regeneration; Bio-fission; Size alteration; Self-sustenance; Space vacuum adaptation; Power augmentation; Power distribution (Nathaniel) See: Powers and abilities
Captain Atom
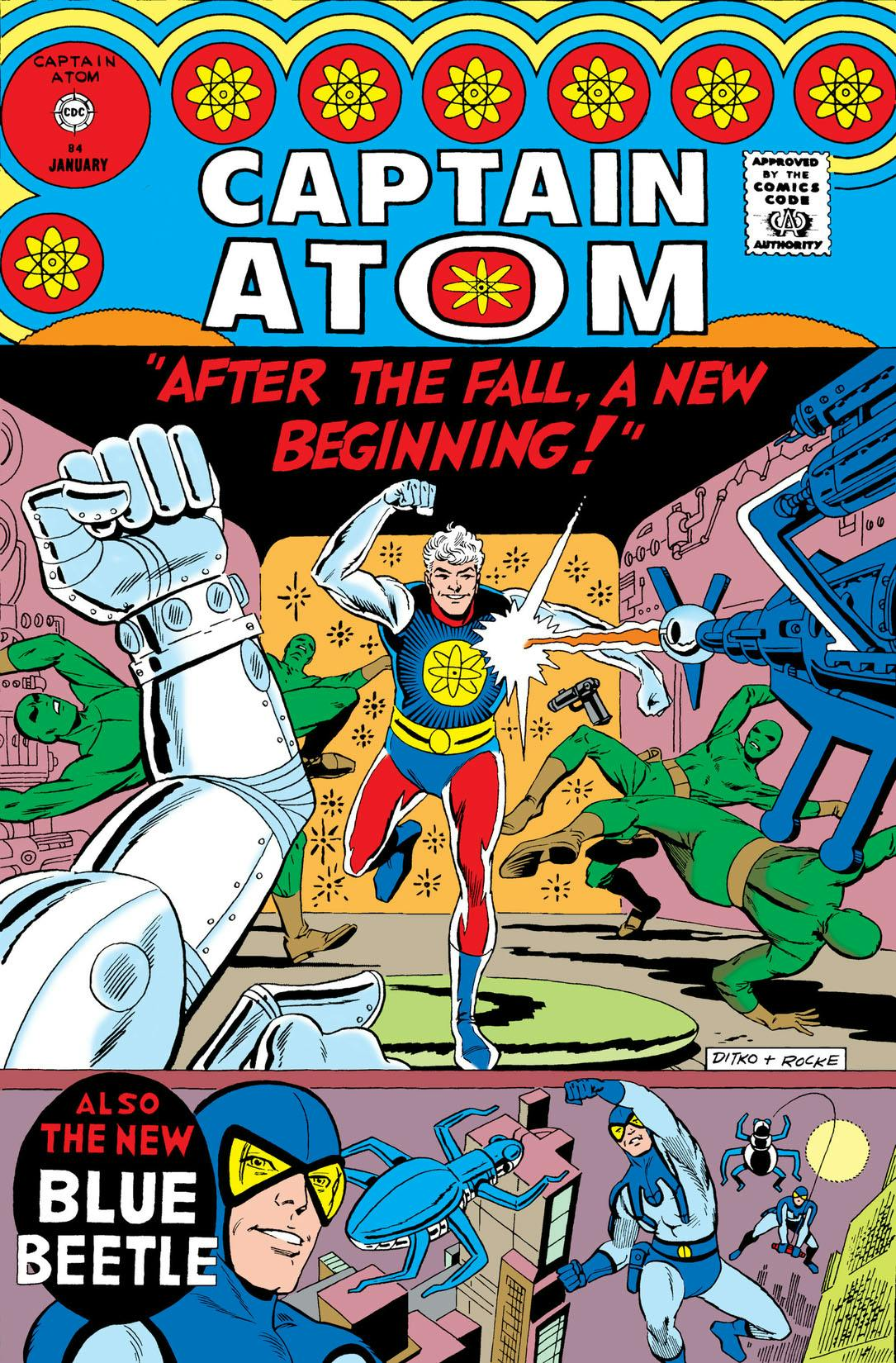
- Cover of Captain Atom #84 (Jan. 1967), art by Steve Ditko and Rocke Mastroserio
Publication information
- Publisher: Vol. 1 Charlton Comics; Vols. 2 and 3 DC Comics
- Schedule: Monthly
- Format: Ongoing series
- Genre: Superhero
- Publication date: Vol. 1 December 1965 – December 1967; Vol. 2 March 1987 – September 1991; Vol. 3 September 2011 – September 2012
- No. of issues: Vol. 1; 12; Vol. 2; 57, plus 2 Annuals; Vol. 3; 12, plus a #0 issue
Creative team
- Written by: Vol. 1 Joe Gill; Vol. 2 Cary Bates, Greg Weisman; Vol. 3 J.T. Krul
- Artist(s): Vol. 3 Freddie Williams II
- Penciller(s): Vol. 1 Steve Ditko; Vol. 2 Pat Broderick, Rafael Kayanan

Captain Atom is the name of several superheroes appearing in American comic books, initially owned by Charlton Comics before being acquired in the 1980s by DC Comics. All possess some form of energy-manipulating abilities, usually relating to nuclear fission and atomic power.

Originally created by Joe Gill and Steve Ditko during the Silver Age of Comic Books to occupy a Superman-like role in Charlton Comics' line-up, the character became part of the DC Universe in 1985 after DC's purchase of Charlton in 1983. The character's similarities to Superman led to DC making numerous attempts to find a distinctive niche for the character within its own stories. As a result, he has played varied roles in the DC Universe, many short-lived, including a period as the supervillain Monarch and the attempted reboot series Breach. Notably, DC's decision not to give Alan Moore permission to use the character in his critically and commercially successful Watchmen (1986) series led to the creation of the popular character Doctor Manhattan. Modern depictions of Captain Atom have instead emphasised, rather than de-emphasise, his similarities to Manhattan.

Captain Atom has appeared in several animated television and film adaptations of Justice League and other DC storylines since the mid-2000s. Chris Cox, Michael T. Weiss, and Brian Bloom, Craig Boot, among others, have voiced the character in animation.

== Publication history ==
Captain Atom was created by writer Joe Gill and artist/co-writer Steve Ditko, and first appeared in Space Adventures #33 (March 1960). Captain Atom was initially created for Charlton Comics, but was later acquired by DC Comics and revised for DC's post-Crisis continuity. In 2011, DC Comics relaunched its superhero comics and rewrote the histories of some characters from scratch, including Captain Atom, giving him a new origin, appearance and slightly altered powers. Captain Atom was the inspiration for Doctor Manhattan, who was featured in the miniseries Watchmen, which would be connected to the DC Universe in the miniseries Doomsday Clock.

Throughout the years, the character has been featured in several moderate-to-short-lived eponymous series, and has been a member of several different versions of DC's flagship superhero team, the Justice League. In all incarnations, the character initially served for the military. In the Charlton Comics continuity, he was a scientist named Allen Adam and gained his abilities by accident when he was seemingly "atomized" and then reformed himself as an atomic-powered being. In both DC Comics incarnations, he is an Air Force pilot named Nathaniel Adam, who was a test subject in a scientific experiment who seemingly disintegrated in the process, only to reappear later as the super-powered Captain Atom. Over the years, DC has attempted to reinvent the character several times. For a period, the character assumed the mantle of the supervillain Monarch, and in 2005 DC attempted to retell the Captain Atom story with an entirely new character, Breach, who was subsequently discarded. In the new continuity following DC's 2011 relaunch, Captain Atom has never been a member of the Justice League and the team views him with distrust; his character origin and abilities were also revised.

== Fictional character biography ==
=== Charlton Comics (Silver Age) ===
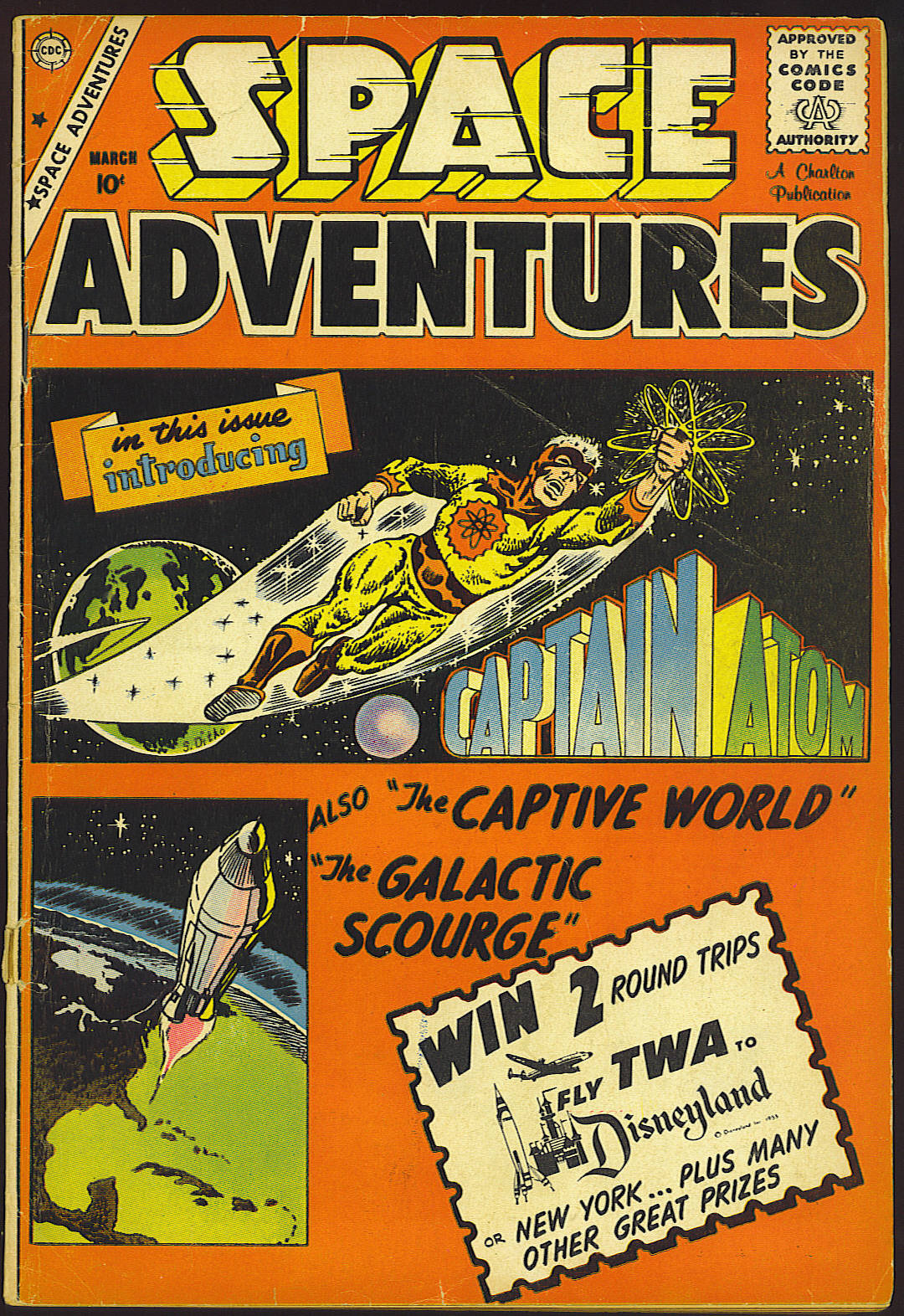
Space Adventures #33 (March 1960), Captain Atom's debut, cover art by Steve Ditko.

The Charlton Comics version of Captain Atom was Allen Adam. The character's origin had Adam working as a technician in a special experimental rocket when it accidentally launched with him trapped inside. Adam was atomized when the rocket exploded while entering the upper atmosphere. However, he gained superpowers that allowed him to reform his body safely on the ground. Adam was outfitted in a red and yellow costume that was designed to shield people from his radiation. When he powered up, his hair became silvery-white.

Captain Atom was first published in a series of short stories in the anthology series Space Adventures #33–40 (March 1960 – June 1961) and #42 (October 1961). Charlton began reprinting his short adventures in the anthology Strange Suspense Stories beginning with issue #75 (June 1965), renaming the title Captain Atom with issue #78 (December 1965) and giving the hero full-length stories and supervillain antagonists such as Dr. Spectro (previous stories involved Cold War anti-Communist missions or dealing with aliens). Captain Atom later teamed with the superhero Nightshade, with whom he shared a mutual attraction. The superhero Blue Beetle starred in the initial back-up feature, later replaced by a Nightshade back-up series.

While primarily referred to as Allen Adam in stories, the fanzine title Charlton Bullseye, published in cooperation with Charlton Comics, gives the character's name as N. Christopher Adam. A later issue of a showcase comic book series published by Charlton also by the name of Charlton Bullseye gave the character's name as John Adam.

DC Comics acquired Captain Atom, among other characters, following the bankruptcy of Charlton Comics. In Crisis on Infinite Earths, the Charlton characters are revealed to originate from Earth-Four and are integrated into DC's continuity. A profile for the Charlton version of the character in Who's Who: The Definitive Directory of the DC Universe identifies him as Nathaniel Christopher Adam, building off the name listed in Charlton Bullseye, which would go on to become the name of the post-Crisis version of the character.

=== DC Comics (Post-Crisis) ===
A new Post-Crisis version of the character was introduced in March 1987 with the launch of a monthly comic, written by Cary Bates and Greg Weisman and drawn by Pat Broderick.

This modern captain's name is established as Nathaniel Christopher Adam, a United States Air Force officer and Vietnam War veteran. Adam had been framed for a crime and was, under military justice, condemned to death; this taking place under the purview of Colonel Wade Eiling in the year 1968. As an alternative to execution, Adam was "asked" to participate in 'Project: Captain Atom', a military experiment with a slim chance of survival. He agreed to this in exchange for a pardon. The experiment involved testing the hull of a crashed alien ship's durability by placing Adam within the metal craft and then exploding an atomic weapon under it. The weapon went off and Adam was seemingly disintegrated. Eighteen years later, Adam suddenly reappeared. The alien metal, now bonded around his body, afforded him incredible abilities far beyond that of a mere mortal. Bonded with the metal, Nathaniel Adam now had powers that resulted from the metal's ability to tap into the "Quantum Field".

Flung into the year 1986, Adam becomes literally a "man out of time". Wade Eiling is now a military general and the second husband of Adam's now-deceased wife Angela. Everyone had assumed that Nathaniel Adam died the day of the experiment, so his presidential pardon was never issued and the current government refused to acknowledge the previous pardon. Seizing the opportunity at hand, Eiling uses the outstanding murder/treason charges against Adam to blackmail him into acting as a military-controlled, government-sanctioned superhero codenamed Captain Atom. Early conflicts involve him coming to terms with the lost time he missed with his now grown children, the death of his wife, her marriage to Eiling, and the overall ramifications of his newly acquired powers. Later, he learns that Project Atom, a secret government funded group that used new experimental machines to harness powerful energies had repeated the same process and created the supervillain Major Force.

Captain Atom joins the Justice League at the request of the U.S. government, eventually serving as leader of Justice League Europe. During his career, he has a brief romance with Catherine Cobert, develops a friendly rivalry with Firestorm, and becomes involved with and eventually marries Plastique.

Later in 2003, writer Jeph Loeb returns Captain Atom to his roots as he went back to work for the government, this time for President Lex Luthor in the first story arc of the Superman/Batman series. Atom seemingly sacrifices his life to save Superman and Earth by piloting a starship to destroy a kryptonite meteor. It is later revealed that Atom had been transported to the WildStorm universe.

==== Monarch ====
Captain Atom's ultimatum, art by Dan Jurgens.

In Infinite Crisis, Captain Atom returns when Superboy-Prime punctures Breach, who wields similar energy-manipulating abilities. The end of Armageddon has him reappear in the devastated Blüdhaven, where he is used to administer radiation treatments. Atom later escapes from Blüdhaven and kills Major Force. After being fitted with an updated version of the Monarch armor to contain his radiation, the Captain awakens. Seeming to be mentally unstable, he breaks free, apparently kills the rampaging Major Force, and then releases a vast amount of energy, obliterating what is left of Blüdhaven. He remains missing until Kyle Rayner, then known as Ion, discovers him in the Bleed, a place between dimensions.

===== Countdown =====
In Countdown to Final Crisis, Captain Atom assumes the Monarch name and battles heroes throughout the multiverse. In the series Countdown: Arena, Monarch lures his 51 alternate universe counterparts to murder them and absorb their power.

During a fight against Superman-Prime, Atom's suit is damaged, releasing a chain reaction that destroys Earth-51. It is later revealed that the Monitor Solomon attacked Atom in Blüdhaven, rupturing his skin and facilitating his transformation into Monarch.

==== Project 7734 ====
During Jimmy Olsen's investigation about Project 7734, the secret black-op commanded by Sam Lane to fight extraterrestrial menaces on Earth (including Kryptonians), it is discovered that an amnesiac and brainwashed Captain Atom is in his possession.

==== Generation Lost ====
Captain Atom appears as one of the central characters in Justice League: Generation Lost, a maxi-series that takes place during the wider Brightest Day event. At the start of the series, Captain Atom is recruited as part of a massive group of superheroes tasked with hunting down Maxwell Lord, who had murdered Ted Kord. During an encounter with Lord at the Justice League's former New York headquarters, Captain Atom is rendered unconscious alongside Fire, Ice, and Booster Gold. The former Justice League members awake to discover that Lord has used his mental abilities to erase his existence from the minds of every single human on the planet, save for those present at the embassy.

During a battle against the new OMAC known as OMAC Prime, Captain Atom allows OMAC Prime to absorb his energy, before reabsorbing the energy and overloading his powers, resulting in him being thrown into the time stream once again. Before being transported through time, Captain Atom threatens to pull Maxwell Lord into the time stream as well unless he undoes the global mindwipe of his existence. Lord complies and restores everyone's memories of him before Captain Atom is pulled away to a time and space unknown.

=== The New 52 ===
In The New 52 reboot of DC's continuity, Captain Atom is reintroduced with altered powers, appearance and origin. He is still USAF pilot Nathaniel Adam. In the new reality, Adam volunteers to participate in an experiment conducted by a research facility called the Continuum. At this facility, Dr. Megala's research is focused on the quantum field and on "dimensional transfer through M Theory". Adam is asked to pilot the dimensional-transfer vessel by Dr. Megala, who is now presented as a particle physicist working out of Colorado, but is seemingly atomized during the experiment. Soon afterwards, he reappears, now an energy-based life form. According to Dr. Megala, Captain Atom's abilities are largely nuclear in nature and involve tapping into the strong nuclear force, the energy that binds protons and neutrons in the nucleus. Adam's physical atoms are constantly splitting apart, giving him incredible power. His body maintains integrity by instantly re-merging these atoms, but extreme use of his powers can interfere with this process and cause Captain Atom's form to become unstable. This leads to a fear that at some point Captain Atom's brain might lose its molecular stability and he will not be able to fix it before it impairs his consciousness or causes him to suffer some form of brain death.

During a fight with Dr. Megala, who has taken control of Firestorm's body, Atom absorbs a massive amount of energy, which disperses his molecules across the timestream. One of these pieces becomes a separate entity named Nathaniel Adym and joins the Science Police in the 31st century.

=== DC Rebirth: The Fall and Rise of Captain Atom ===
Captain Atom (Nathaniel Adam) lost control of his powers and caused a devastating accident in this six-issue series set in 2012. Needing to contain his unstable abilities, he went into Dr. Megala's Subterranean Suppression Dome but seemingly exploded. The world believed Nathaniel Adam was killed in a blast; However, Adam took a subatomic trip through time and ended up without powers, 20 years in the past. It is revealed that the quantum blowback sent him back in time to 1994 as a normal man. Adam's wound distorted after being shot during an attempted car robbery, and his body was encased in liquid metal. As a result of the time stream correcting itself, he was thrown back to 2017.

=== DC All In ===
In Absolute Power, Captain Atom loses his powers to Amanda Waller's Amazo army. Atom (Ray Palmer) and Atom (Ryan Choi) use him to test a device that can retrieve powers and restore them to the correct superhero. This leads to Adam's powers returning at full strength, along with those of other "Atom Project" subjects. In the series Jenny Sparks (2024), the titular character works with the Justice League in an attempt to stop Captain Atom after he starts to think of himself as a god, using his powers to heal diseases for some while coldly killing others at his whim. The revised depiction is heavily influenced by Doctor Manhattan.

In Jenny Sparks #5, Atom's original DC Comics backstory is confirmed as canon. A willing army recruit famed for making "unheard of" numbers of kills, Adam was arrested for "brutal" behaviours in the jungle in 1968 (potentially having been framed). To avoid hanging, he participated in an experiment to test whether a recovered alien ship could withstand a nuclear attack. The molten ship appeared to kill Adam, but he reappeared decades later as Captain Atom – true to form, he promptly enlisted again in the U.S. army and later the Justice League, where "no one gave him much thought" and he was viewed as "generic". More recently, he checked himself into a mental hospital, before leaving with a god complex. After being captured by Gorilla Grodd's Legion of Doom and having his powers partially drained in the "We are Yesterday" crossover story, Captain Atom is saved by Ryan Choi and has an epiphany that he should use his powers once again to do good.

== Powers and abilities ==
Captain Atom's body is coated in the alien metal Dilustel, which enables him to generate vast amounts of nuclear energy and makes him virtually immortal. This energy gives Atom immense strength, durability, speed, and the ability to survive in space. He commonly manipulates his energy into force field bubbles, or explosive "bombs", but the most common form is a simple energy blast. Atom has been shown to be capable of manipulating even exotic energies such as magic, and has a high degree of resistance to such attacks. Atom's skin is highly durable and can only be damaged by the X-Ionizer, a device designed to cut through it. Cracking or rupturing his skin causes Atom to leak radiation at an uncontrollable rate, which causes him to run the risk of atomic detonation.

If Atom absorbs too much energy at once, the energy transports him uncontrollably through time. Depending on the type of energy absorbed, he either goes forward or backward in time, though he also possesses the ability to voluntarily move forward in the time-stream. Captain Atom states that through concentration, he can briefly travel ahead in time ("about a week or so"). The process is exhausting and the period he can interact in the future appears to be limited to a few minutes before he returns to the present. In the case of involuntary quantum jumping, he is typically shown as being stuck in the time-stream for as long as it takes his body to process any absorbed energy.

In addition to his superhuman abilities, Nathaniel Adam is also an experienced United States Air Force pilot. He is especially skilled in combat piloting, is trained in military weaponry, strategy, and hand-to-hand combat, and speaks multiple languages, including Russian. Adam also has strong survival instincts derived from his experiences during the Vietnam War.

At other times and storylines, Captain Atom has had different or greatly increased powers. During his Monarch era, his powers significantly increased, making him a multiversal level threat. The short-lived New 52 version of the character was an "energy-based life form" whose control over physics meant he could transform lava into snow and manipulate time.

== Rogues gallery ==
Captain Atom has his own enemies:

- Bolt (Larry Bolatinsky): An assassin and mercenary sporting an electrokinetic suit hired by General Eiling for a number of militia hero sales schemes. Often came in conflict with Captain Atom over the course of his military career while under contract in another of many government staged publicity stunts.
- Doctor Spectro (Tom Emery): A scientist driven mad by his emotion-altering prisms, Dr. Spectro gained the ability to affect emotions directly. Post-Crisis, Spectro was a small-time crook General Wade Eiling used to create a cover story for Captain Atom. Very bright costumes were a characteristic of Dr. Spectro. Doctor Spectro first appeared in Captain Atom #79 as the first supervillain antagonist of the titular hero, and was created by Steve Ditko and Joe Gill. The character first appeared in Charlton Comics, later in DC Comics. James Sandy counted Doctor Spectro among the many comic characters that were introduced in the Silver Age of Comic Books and disappeared again after a short run, but authors of The Superhero Book found him a unique supervillain.
- Fiery-Icer: A mercenary with a suit that unleashes intense fire from his right gauntlet and frigid cold from the left, the mysterious Fiery-Icer fought Captain Atom on several occasions.
- General Wade Eiling: Once his commanding officer in the military who even in his new identity Nathaniel Adam often butted heads with due to his unscrupulous means of promoting America's new military assets. Unknown to the Captain for the longest time, it was the corrupt general who had Adam framed for killing a senior officer which, in turn, subjected him to the Atom Project years ago.
- The Ghost (Alec Rois): A physicist who developed a teleportation device that he used to become a millionaire, Alec Rois took on the persona of the Ghost and became Captain Atom and his partner Nightshade's Pre-Crisis nemesis. Post-Crisis, he was a cult leader nicknamed the Faceless One, a disgruntled weapons developer and a former CIA operative who sought revenge against an unscrupulous employer. Having been trapped in the Quantum Field by his own Stealthray tech, he is released as an energy being who controls teletranslocation through it and has connections to Atom's past conviction while enlisted five years ago.
- Iron Arms: A mercenary that employs a backpack that powers powerful cybernetic arms.
- The Cambodian (Rako): An arms dealer and personal enforcer of the Post-Crisis Ghost. A survivor of a U.S. bombing raid during the Vietnam War, this Cambodian refugee was taken into Rois' services while he was a government agent. Acting as the Green Elite's hitman, Rako framed Nathaniel Adam for treason under Rois' orders, resulting in his drafting into Project: Atom. As the Cambodian, he would clad himself in armor and weaponry tempered by the X-Ionizer, wielding a skein sharp enough to pierce Captain Atom's Dilustel armor.
- Major Force (Clifford Zmeck): A rapist/murderer exposed to the same experiment that created Captain Atom, he would regularly betray the U.S. government or go back to work for their more clandestine, i.e., crooked, organizations, becoming a regular as Captain Atom's Post-Crisis nemesis.
- Monarch (Hank Hall): In an alternate future, Hank Hall goes mad and kills Earth's heroes to conquer the world. When the hero Waverider comes back in time to prevent this, he instead creates the paradox that made his future possible. When Monarch goes back in time to retrieve his past self, it was Captain Atom that failed to stop him. Captain Atom battled the villain through time to quell the guilt of his failure to stop him earlier.
- Plastique (Bette Sans Souci): A French-Canadian terrorist with explosive-based powers and intense separatist designs, first came in contact with Captain Atom during an assassination attempt at a Canadian/American peace delegation. The two frequently clash with one another, eventually falling in love and entering into a whirlwind marriage, albeit a short-lived one.
- Punch and Jewelee: A husband and wife team of villains who work as thieves and mercenaries. Post-Crisis, they instead fought King Faraday and Nightshade.
- Thirteen: In reality a federal agent from Earth's future, Thirteen travels back in time with his partner Faustus, a talking cat, to prevent the Ghost from stealing an experimental missile and end up facing Captain Atom. He appears to be a sorcerer but it is unknown if he employs true magic or just sufficiently advanced science.
- Ultramax: Former assassin turned death row inmate in the early 2000s, when Atom had his meltdown and was catapulted into the Q-Field. Max Thrane, as he was facing the electric chair at the time, was bathed in the fallout during his execution. About a decade later, Captain Atom would return and undo his predicament, only for him to awake finding he had gained similar Quantum Powers due to the hero's blowback years ago, to which, now going by the name Ultramax, Thrane set out on a path of revenge against the one who slated him for his death sentence.

== Other versions ==
- An alternate universe version of Captain Atom appears in Armageddon 2001.
- An alternate universe version of Captain Atom who was killed by Parasite appears in Kingdom Come.
- Several alternate universe versions of Captain Atom appear in Countdown to Final Crisis: Quantum Storm from Earth-37, the leader of the Atomic Knights from Earth-38, Brigadier Atom from Earth-13, a Hulk-like version named Attum, the robotic Quantum Mechanix, Captain Adamma, Quantum Boy, an anthropomorphic wolf version, a Soviet Atom from Earth-30, a Doctor Manhattan-lookalike, and a giant-sized anthropomorphic atom.
- An alternate universe version of Captain Atom from Earth-4, amalgamated with Doctor Manhattan and Marvel Comics character Reed Richards, appears in Final Crisis and The Multiversity.
- An alternate universe version of Nathaniel Adam who never became Captain Atom appears in Flashpoint.

== In other media ==
=== Television ===
- The Nathaniel Adam incarnation of Captain Atom appears in Justice League Unlimited, voiced initially by George Eads and subsequently by Chris Cox. This version is a member of the Justice League, speaks with a slight Texan accent, and is a disembodied mass of energy contained in a special suit with a limit to how much energy he can absorb, which will cause him to explode like a nuclear bomb if exceeded.
- The Nathaniel Adam incarnation of Captain Atom appears in Batman: The Brave and the Bold, voiced by Brian Bloom. This version, also known as Allen Adams and Cameron Scott, is an arrogant and egocentric member of Justice League International who is fond of making public service announcements and looks down on heroes without superpowers.
- The Nathaniel Adam incarnation of Captain Atom appears in Young Justice, voiced by Michael T. Weiss. This version is a member of the Justice League. In the second season, he becomes the leader of the League before handing over the position to Black Canary by the season finale.

=== Film ===
- The Nathaniel Adam incarnation of Captain Atom appears in Superman/Batman: Public Enemies, voiced by Xander Berkeley. This version works for the U.S. government under President Lex Luthor and leads a group of government-sanctioned heroes.
- The Nathaniel Adam incarnation of Captain Atom makes a cameo appearance in Justice League: The Flashpoint Paradox, voiced by Lex Lang. This version is a member of the Justice League. Additionally, the Flashpoint incarnation of Captain Atom makes an appearance, during which he was captured by the Atlanteans and forced to power Aquaman's doomsday device.
- The Nathaniel Adam incarnation of Captain Atom appears in Injustice, voiced by Fred Tatasciore.
- The Allen Adam incarnation of Captain Atom appears in DC Showcase: Blue Beetle, voiced by Jeff Bennett.
- The Allen Adam incarnation of Captain Atom appears in Justice League: Crisis on Infinite Earths, voiced by Brett Dalton.

=== Video games ===
The Allen Adam and Nathaniel Adam incarnations of Captain Atom appear as character summons in Scribblenauts Unmasked: A DC Comics Adventure.

=== Miscellaneous ===
Captain Atom appears in the Injustice: Gods Among Us prequel comic. He joins Batman's Insurgency to combat Superman's growing Regime before being mortally wounded by Wonder Woman while retrieving an enhancement pill from the Fortress of Solitude. Captain Atom then drags Superman to the atmosphere in an attempt to kill him, with the resulting explosion leaving the former dead and Wonder Woman comatose.

== Collected editions ==
Title	Material collected	Published date	ISBN
Action Heroes Archive Volume 1	Space Adventures (vol. 2) #33-42, Captain Atom (vol. 1) #78-82	November 2004	978-1401203023
Action Heroes Archive Volume 2	Captain Atom (vol. 1) #83–89, Charlton Bullseye #1–2, 5, Mysterious Suspense #1, Blue Beetle (vol. 5) #1-5	May 2007	978-1401213466
Captain Atom: Armageddon	Captain Atom: Armageddon #1-9	November 2006	978-1401211066
Captain Atom Vol. 1: Evolution	Captain Atom (vol. 4) #1–6	December 2012	978-1401237158
Captain Atom Vol. 2: Genesis	Captain Atom (vol. 4) #0, 7-12	August 2013	978-1401240998
Captain Atom: The Rise and Fall of Captain Atom	Captain Atom: The Rise and Fall of Captain Atom #1-6	January 2018	978-1401274177
