= 1996 in art =

Events from the year 1996 in art.

== Events ==
- 8 January – Shortly after publication of the Italian edition of his book The Art Forger's Handbook, English-born art forger Eric Hebborn is found lying in a street in Rome, his skull crushed with a blunt instrument; he dies in hospital on 11 January.
- 15 March – Arken Museum of Modern Art in Copenhagen, designed by Søren Robert Lund, opens.
- November – Museum für Gegenwart (contemporary art museum) in former Hamburger Bahnhof in Berlin, converted by Josef Paul Kleihues, opens.
- Gallery of Modern Art in Glasgow opens.
- Museum Tinguely in Basel, designed by Mario Botta, opens.
- For an exhibition at the de Appel Arts Center in Amsterdam, Maurizio Cattelan steals the entire contents of another artist's show from a nearby gallery with the idea of passing it off as his own work, Another Fucking Readymade, until the police insist he return the items on threat of arrest.

== Awards ==
- Archibald Prize – Wendy Sharpe, Self Portrait as Diana of Erskineville
- Jan Amos Comenius Medal (UNESCO) – Yaacov Agam, for the "Agam Method" for visual education of young children
- The Inaugural Hugo Boss Prize – Matthew Barney
- Turner Prize – Douglas Gordon
- Wynne Prize – William Robinson, Creation landscape – earth and sea

== Exhibitions ==
- British Art Show 5 – various venues in Manchester
- Sol LeWitt Prints: 1970–1995 – travelling exhibition by the Museum of Modern Art, New York.
- Vermeer – nearly complete exhibition of 25 works, The Hague and Metropolitan Museum of Art, New York.

== Works ==
- Stephen Antonakos – The Room Chapel (mixed media sculpture)
- George Beasley – Five Points Monument (Atlanta)
- Robert Calvo – Ascension (sculpture, Portland, Oregon)
- Maurizio Cattelan – Bidibidobidiboo (sculpture)
- Angela Conner – Rising Universe (water sculpture)
- Paul DiPasquale – The Arthur Ashe Monument on Monument Avenue in Richmond, Virginia
- Raymond Kaskey – Gateway of Dreams (Atlanta)
- David LaChapelle – "Alexander McQueen and Isabella Blow"
- Roy Lichtenstein – Brushstrokes (sculpture, Portland, Oregon)
- Liza Lou – Kitchen (completed)
- Ron Mueck – Big Baby, Mongrel and Pinocchio (sculptures
- Alexander Stoddart – Ossian: in memoriam James Macpherson 1736–96 (bronze head)

== Films ==
- Basquiat

== Deaths ==
=== January to June ===
- 3 January – Terence Cuneo, English railway and military painter (b. 1907).
- 6 January – Duane Hanson, American sculptor (b. 1925).
- 9 January – Félix González-Torres, Cuban artist (b. 1957).
- 11 January – Eric Hebborn, English-born art forger (b. 1934).
- 11 February – Pierre Edouard Leopold Verger, French photographer and ethnographer (b. 1902).
- 18 January – Leonor Fini, Argentine-born surrealist painter (b. 1908).
- 28 January – Jerry Siegel, American comic book artist (b. 1914).
- 11 February – Pierre Edouard Leopold Verger, French photographer and ethnographer (b. 1902).
- 15 February – Sybren Valkema, Dutch glass artist, founder of the European Studio Glass Movement. (b. 1916)
- 20 February – Audrey Munson, American actress and artist's model (b. 1891).
- 5 March – Joshua Compston, British gallerist (b. 1970).
- 15 March – Helen Chadwick, British artist (b. 1953).
- 14 April – Mervyn Levy, Welsh-born art critic and artist (b. 1914).
- 25 April – Saul Bass, American graphic designer and Academy Award-winning filmmaker (b. 1920).
- 7 May – William Copley, American artist (b. 1919).
- 10 June – Marie-Louise von Motesiczky, Austrian painter (b. 1906).

=== July to December ===
- 17 July - Rico Puhlmann, German photographer (b. 1934).
- 28 July – Roger Tory Peterson, American naturalist, ornithologist, artist and educator (b. 1908).
- 27 August – Abram Games, English poster artist (b. 1914).
- 24 October – Lin Onus, Scottish-Aboriginal Koori artist (b. 1948).
- 22 November – Edmund Teske, American photographer (b. 1911).
- 26 November – Paul Rand, American graphic designer (b. 1914).
- 29 November – Dan Flavin, American minimalist artist (b. 1933).
- 3 December – Jean Tabaud, French artist (b. 1914).
- 11 December – Willie Rushton, English cartoonist, satirist, comedian, actor and performer (b. 1937).
- 16 December – Quentin Bell, English art historian and author (b. 1910).
- 25 December – Gabriel Loire, French stained glass artist (b. 1904).
