= Brushstroke =

Sculpture by Roy Lichtenstein

- Artist: Roy Lichtenstein
- Year: 1996
- Type: Aluminum
- Dimensions: 980 cm × 670 cm × 180 cm (387 in × 262 in × 72 in)
- Location: Museo Nacional Centro de Arte Reina Sofía, Hirshhorn Museum and Sculpture Garden; Madrid, Spain and Washington, D.C., United States
- Owner: Museo Nacional Centro de Arte Reina Sofía, Smithsonian Institution

Brushstroke is a sculpture by Roy Lichtenstein. There are two copies. The original was created in 2001 for the Museo Nacional Centro de Arte Reina Sofía in Madrid, Spain. The second was delivered to the Hirshhorn Museum and Sculpture Garden in Washington, DC, on September 16, 2003, and dedicated on October 25, 2003.

== See also ==
- 1996 in art
- List of public art in Washington, D.C., Ward 2
