= Strange Suspense Stories =

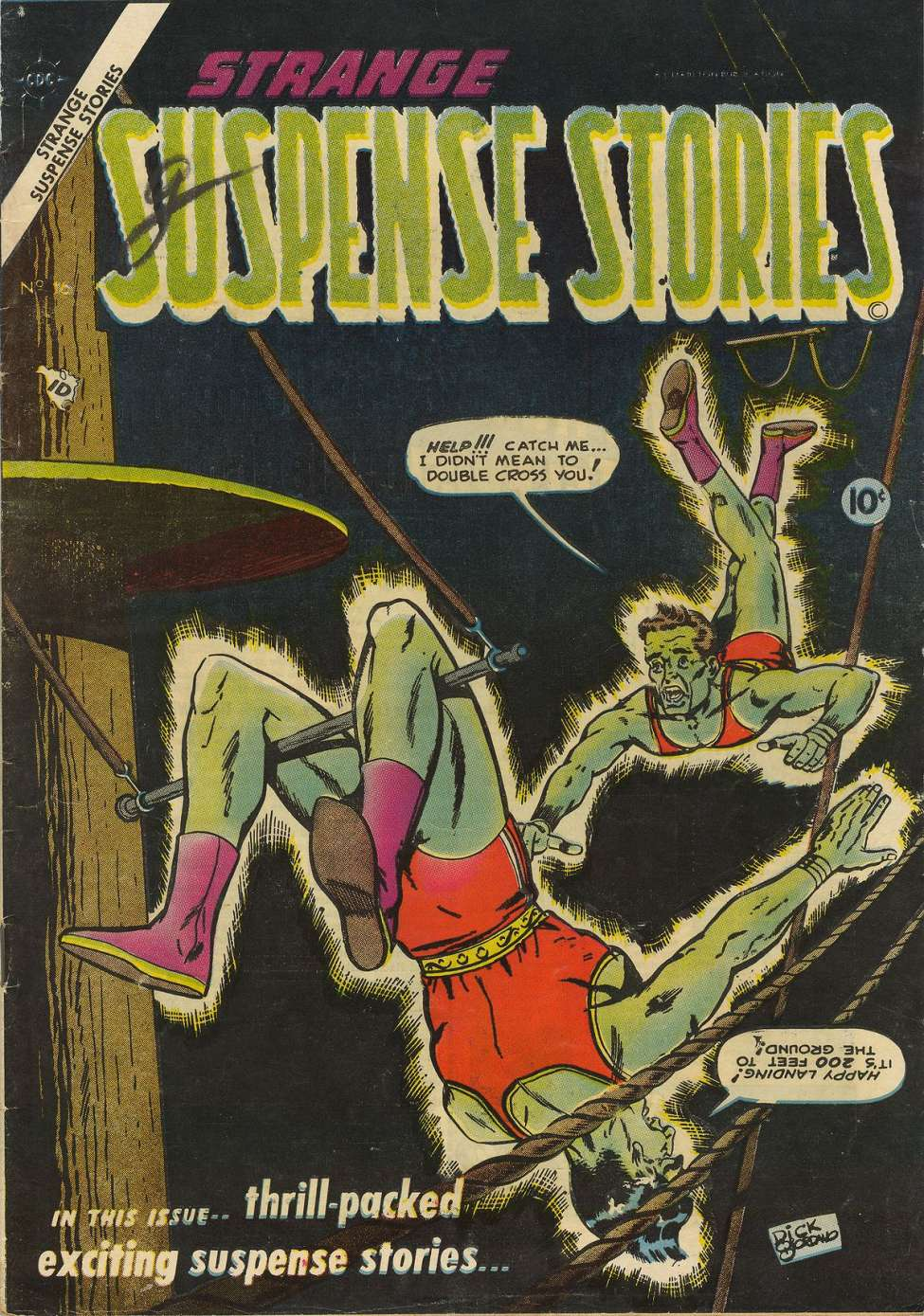
- Cover of Strange Suspense Stories #16 (Jan./Feb. 1954), the first issue of the title published by Charlton Comics. Cover art by Dick Giordano.

Publication information
- Publisher: Fawcett Comics; Charlton Comics
- Schedule: Bi-monthly
- Format: Anthology
- Genre: Suspense; Science fiction Horror; Fantasy
- Publication date: vol. 1: June 1952 – Feb. 1953 (Fawcett); Jan./Feb. – Nov. 1954 (Charlton); Oct. 1955 – Oct. 1965 (Charlton) vol. 2: Oct. 1967 – Sept. 1969
- No. of issues: vol. 1: 63 vol. 2: 9

Creative team
- Written by: Joe Gill, Steve Skeates, Denny O'Neil
- Artist(s): Steve Ditko, Jim Aparo, Pat Boyette, Rocke Mastroserio, Frank McLaughlin, Bill Molno, Sheldon Moldoff, Joe Shuster
- Penciller(s): George Evans, Charles Nicholas
- Inker(s): Vince Alascia, Sal Trapani
- Editor(s): Pat Masulli, Sal Gentile

Strange Suspense Stories is a comic book that was published in two volumes by Fawcett Comics and Charlton Comics in the 1950s and 1960s. Starting out as a horror/suspense title, the first volume gradually moved toward eerie fantasy and weird science fiction, before ending as a vehicle for the superhero Captain Atom. The title's second volume was more in the horror/suspense vein. Altogether, 72 issues of Strange Suspense Stories were published.

Notable contributors included Steve Ditko, Vince Alascia, Jim Aparo, Pat Boyette, George Evans, Joe Gill, Frank McLaughlin, Bill Molno, Rocke Mastroserio, Sheldon Moldoff, Charles Nicholas, Denny O'Neil, Joe Shuster, and Steve Skeates.

== Publication history ==
=== Vol. 1 ===
Fawcett Comics debuted Strange Suspense Stories in June 1952, featuring artwork by (among others) George Evans and Sheldon Moldoff. The title ran for five issues under Fawcett. In 1954–55, Charlton acquired a stable of comic book properties from Fawcett Publications, which was shutting down its comics division. Charlton continued publishing two of Fawcett's horror books—This Magazine Is Haunted and Strange Suspense Stories, initially using unpublished material from Fawcett's inventory.

In a quirk common to the publisher, Charlton's Strange Suspense Stories started not with issue #6 (continuing the Fawcett numbering) nor with issue #1, but with issue #16, continuing the numbering of a cancelled crime/horror series, Lawbreakers Suspense Stories, which itself had continued the numbering of the crime comic Lawbreakers. Both of those earlier titles were decidedly pre-Comics Code books, featuring murders, gruesome covers, and scantily-clad women.

Artistic chores were then handed to Steve Ditko, whose moody, individualistic touch came to dominate Charlton's supernatural line.

Charlton's Strange Suspense Stories ran seven issues to #22 (Nov. 1954) before being temporarily retitled This is Suspense! After four issues under that name, the title reverted to Strange Suspense Stories, picking up with issue #27 (Oct. 1955).

Artwork from Strange Suspense Stories was used as inspiration for artist Roy Lichtenstein's 1965/1966 Brushstroke series, including Brushstroke and Big Painting No. 6. The panels in question came from the story "The Painting", with art by Dick Giordano, in issue #72 (Oct. 1964).

As the industry moved into the Silver Age, Charlton shifted Strange Suspense Stories to a more heroic vein, reprinting short Captain Atom adventures beginning with issue #75 (June 1965). With issue #78 (Dec. 1965), Charlton renamed the title Captain Atom. The Captain Atom title lasted until issue #89 (Dec. 1967) before being cancelled.

=== Vol. 2 ===
In Oct. 1967, Charlton revived the title for another run, this time with a more straight-ahead horror focus. Stories were written by Steve Skeates and Denny O'Neil, and the book was edited by Sal Gentile. Strange Suspense Stories vol. 2 lasted nine issues until Sept. 1969.
