= France Herron =

American comic book writer and editor (1917-1966)

- Herron on the cover of Gang Busters #10 (June–July 1949)
- Born: Francis Edward Herron; July 23, 1917 Lee County, Virginia, U.S.
- Died: September 2, 1966 (age 49) New York, New York, U.S.
- Areas: Writer, Editor
- Pseudonyms: Eddie Herron; Ed "France" Herron; France E. Herron
- Notable works: Captain Marvel Jr. Red Skull; Tomahawk; Green Arrow
- Awards: Bill Finger Award 2020 (posthumously)

Francis Edward Herron (July 23, 1917 – September 2, 1966) was an American comic book writer and editor active in the 1940s–1960s, mainly for DC Comics. He is credited with co-creating Captain Marvel Jr. and the Red Skull, as well as such characters as Cave Carson, Nighthawk, and Mr. Scarlet and Pinky the Whiz Kid. Herron spent the bulk of his time in the comics industry writing for such characters as Green Arrow, Superman, and the Western character Tomahawk.

== Biography ==
=== Early life and career ===
Herron was born in 1917 in Ohio farm country. Claiming to be of partial Cherokee descent, he grew up in West Virginia.

Herron got his start in comics while still a teenager, with the Harry "A" Chesler "packaging" studio in 1937, writing and editing for such Centaur Comics' titles as Star Comics and Star Ranger Funnies. In 1939, Herron joined Fox Features Syndicate, where he first met Joe Simon and Jack Kirby. In 1940–1941, Simon and Kirby hired Herron to write stories for their new creation Captain America, published by the Marvel Comics forerunner Timely Comics. Herron and artists Joe Simon and Jack Kirby co-created the Red Skull in Captain America Comics #1 (March 1941).

Beginning in 1940 and continuing throughout the decade, Herron wrote various features for the publisher Quality Comics. From 1942 to 1944, Herron wrote the Captain Midnight strip for the Chicago Sun Syndicate.

=== Fawcett Comics ===
Herron joined Fawcett Comics in 1940, eventually becoming the company's executive editor by 1942. With artist Mac Raboy, he created Captain Marvel Jr. in Whiz Comics #25 (Dec. 1941), and with Jack Kirby he created Mr. Scarlet in Wow Comics #1 (Winter 1940–1941) and Pinky the Whiz Kid in Wow Comics #4 (Spring 1942). It was in the Mr. Scarlet story in Wow Comics #1 that the name "Gotham City" first appeared in the comics. Comics historian Greg Theakston notes that this pre-dates its name as such in DC Comics' Batman #4. During this period, Herron wrote for such Fawcett titles as Captain Marvel Adventures and Captain Marvel Jr..

=== World War II ===
Herron joined the U.S. Army in 1942, where he wrote for the military newspaper Stars and Stripes during his tour of duty. While at Stars and Stripes, Herron met artist Curt Swan, who later became the definitive Superman artist. According to Swan, it was Herron who first directed him to DC Comics.

=== DC Comics ===
Herron began writing for DC Comics in 1945, initially on Green Arrow stories in Adventure Comics and World's Finest Comics. Herron was Green Arrow's lead writer throughout the 1950s, staying with the character until 1963. Other superhero titles Herron worked on included Superman, which he wrote many stories for throughout the 1950s, and Challengers of the Unknown, which Herron was the lead writer for from 1959 until 1966. He wrote a number of Batman and Robin stories for Detective Comics and Batman in the mid-1950s and mid-1960s. Herron was one of the lead writers on Batman during the overhaul of the character and the introduction of his "New Look." Throughout the 1950s and the 1960s, Herron partnered with artist Fred Ray as the creative team on DC's Tomahawk and the Tomahawk stories which appeared in World's Finest Comics during this period. In the mid-1950s, Herron wrote the features Pow Wow Smith and Nighthawk for DC's Western Comics omnibus; he continued to write spot stories for the title until 1961. Herron wrote mystery comics titles including House of Mystery, Mystery in Space, Strange Adventures, and Tales of the Unexpected. From 1953 to 1959, he wrote many stories for such DC war comics as All-American Men of War, Our Army at War, Our Fighting Forces, and Star Spangled War Stories; returning to such work in 1963–1964.

With artist Dick Sprang, Herron co-created Firefly in Detective Comics #184 (June 1952) and the Batman of Zur-En-Arrh in Batman #113 (Aug. 1958). Artist Lee Elias and Herron co-created the Clock King in World's Finest Comics #111 (Aug. 1960). With artist Bruno Premiani, Herron co-created Cave Carson in The Brave and the Bold #31 (Aug. 1960).

=== Harvey Comics ===
In 1966 Herron moved to Harvey Comics, hired by his old associate Joe Simon. During that year, Herron was the lead writer for the publisher's short-lived Harvey Thriller superhero line, working on characters such as Dynamite Joe, Glowing Gladiator, Jack Q. Frost, and Lone Tiger, in the titles Robot Parade and Spyman.

=== Syndicated newspaper strips ===
In addition to his work in the comic book field, Herron wrote syndicated newspaper comic strips for Columbia Features. Beginning in 1955, he wrote the daily strips Davy Crockett, Frontiersman and Nero Wolfe—staying on the Davy Crocket strip until 1959, when he became the writer of the Bat Masterson and Rip Tide strips, which he wrote until his death in 1966.

=== Death ===
Herron died from cancer in September 1966.

=== Awards ===
Herrin was posthumously awarded the Bill Finger Award in 2020 along with fellow honorees Virginia Hubbell, Nicola Cuti, Leo Dorfman, Gaylord DuBois, and Joe Gill.

== Bibliography ==
=== Centaur Publications ===
- The Arrow #3 (1941)
- Detective Eye #2 (1940)
- Masked Marvel #3 (1940)

=== DC Comics ===
- Action Comics #128–130, 137, 145, 147 (Vigilante) (1949–1950)
- Adventure Comics #118, 152, 174–175, 221, 248, 256 (Green Arrow) (1947–1959)
- All-American Men of War #7, 9, 11, 13–17, 20–25, 27–29, 41, 47–48, 51–52, 54, 57, 68–69, 71, 103 (1953–1964)
- All-Star Western #73–75, 80–89, 91, 93, 96, 99 (1953–1958)
- Batman #86, 105, 113, 164–166, 168–169, 174 (1954–1965)
- Big Town #1–2, 24–27, 31–32, 40 (1951–1956)
- Blackhawk #181, 196, 200, 212, 218–221, 223–227 (1963–1966)
- Boy Commandos #11, 20, 22, 24–25, 29, 32, 34–35 (1945–1949)
- The Brave and the Bold #1 (Golden Gladiator); #31–33 (Cave Carson) (1955–1960)
- Challengers of the Unknown #11, 14, 29, 34, 37–38, 40–43, 47, 50, 52–54 (1959–1967)
- Danger Trail #1–2 (1950)
- Detective Comics #184, 208–209 (1952–1954)
- G.I. Combat #47, 49–53, 59, 72, 103 (1957–1963)
- Hopalong Cassidy #97–111, 113, 115–116, 118, 122 (1955–1957)
- House of Secrets #19, 59 (1959–1963)
- My Greatest Adventure #61, 70, 76 (1961–1963)
- Mystery in Space #23–24, 27, 32, 36, 38, 41–42 (1954–1958)
- Our Army at War #16–17, 20, 22, 24–32, 35–39, 41–43, 57, 61, 63–65, 67–69, 74–75, 134, 138 (1953–1964)
- Our Fighting Forces #1–5, 15, 18, 23–25, 27–32, 37–38, 83 (1954–1964)
- Robin Hood Tales #12–13 (1957–1958)
- Sea Devils #12–15 (1963–1964)
- Star-Spangled Comics #60, 123–126, 128 (1946–1952)
- Star Spangled War Stories #14–25, 27–28, 30–37, 39–42, 45–46, 51, 58–59, 62–64, 67, 74 (1953–1958)
- Strange Adventures #49, 51, 53, 59–61, 78–79, 81–84, 87–89, 154, 157, 160–163, 182, 189 (1954–1966)
- Superboy #1, 22 (1949–1952)
- Superman #98 (1955)
- Tales of the Unexpected #13, 84, 103 (1957–1967)
- Tomahawk #81, 83–103, 106–108, 111, 118–119 (1962–1968)
- Western Comics #43–60 (1954–1956)
- World's Finest Comics #28–29, 36, 71–72, 91, 95, 97–98, 100–102, 104–112, 114–116, 120, 124–125, 129, 131–134, 136, 138 (Green Arrow); #39 (Boy Commandos); #72, 79 (Tomahawk); #126, 129 (Superman and Batman) (1947–1963)

=== Fawcett Comics ===
- Whiz Comics #25 (1941)
- Wow Comics #1 (1940)

=== Harvey Comics ===
- Double-Dare Adventures #1–2 (1966–1967)
- Spyman #2–3 (1966–1967)

=== Timely Comics ===
- Captain America Comics #1, 7 (1941)
- Mystic Comics #2 (1940)

Preceded by Dave Wood	"Green Arrow" feature in World's Finest Comics writer 1957–1963	Succeeded by Bill Finger
Preceded by Joseph Samachson	Tomahawk writer 1962–1968	Succeeded by Robert Kanigher
Preceded by Bob Haney	Blackhawk writer 1966	Succeeded by Bob Haney
