= Batman and Superman: Battle of the Super Sons =

- Promotional poster
- Directed by: Matt Peters
- Screenplay by: Jeremy Adams
- Based on: Super-Sons by: Bob Haney; Dick Dillin
- Produced by: Rick Morales; Jim Krieg
- Starring: Jack Dylan Grazer; Jack Griffo
- Music by: Kristopher Carter; Michael McCuistion; Lolita Ritmanis
- Production companies: Warner Bros. Animation; DC Entertainment; Studio Mir (animation services)
- Distributed by: Warner Bros. Home Entertainment
- Release dates: October 7, 2022 (NYCC); October 18, 2022 (Video)
- Running time: 79 minutes
- Country: United States
- Language: English

Batman and Superman: Battle of the Super Sons is a 2022 American animated direct-to-video superhero film produced by Warner Bros. Animation and based on the comic books of the same name. It is the 50th installment in the DC Universe Animated Original Movies and the first fully-CGI animated film from DC Entertainment. The film was written by Jeremy Adams and directed by Matt Peters, and stars Jack Dylan Grazer and Jack Griffo as Jonathan Kent and Damian Wayne respectively. It premiered on October 7, 2022 at New York Comic Con, and was released to home video on October 18. It received generally positive reviews from critics.

== Plot ==
As the planet Krypton is on the verge of exploding, Jor-El and Lara put their newborn son Kal-El in a spaceship bound for Earth. An alien parasite named Starro escapes his containment in Jor-El's lab and stows away on the ship before it is sent to Earth, but falls off the ship partway through its journey. The spaceship lands in Kansas where Kal-El is raised by Jonathan and Martha Kent, and named Clark. Clark discovers he has superhuman abilities and becomes Superman. He meets Batman and reveals his identity to Lois Lane; the two marry and have a son named Jon.

Years later, the Kents are living in Smallville. Jon is frustrated by his father's frequent absences, unaware that Clark is Superman. One night, Superman saves the Justice League Watchtower from falling out of orbit after it is impacted by space debris. Superman has to leave to save Japan from a tsunami. On the Watchtower, Green Arrow, who investigates what hit the Watchtower, is attacked by a creature.

The next day, on his birthday, Jon develops heat vision. Clark reveals that he is Superman and takes Jon to Gotham City to see Batman for advice on when or if the rest of Jon's powers could emerge. Jon meets Batman's son Damian Wayne aka Robin, who is initially rude to him. Batman reveals to Superman that he has lost contact with the Watchtower and the two depart to see what is going on after Superman drops Jon off back in Smallville. When Batman and Superman arrive at the Watchtower, a possessed Martian Manhunter infects them with Starro spores.

Returning to the Batcave, the possessed Batman attempts to infect Damian, who slices the spore apart. After Damian tricks Batman's spore into thinking that it has successfully killed him, he overhears that Starro has been able to infect both the Justice League and Teen Titans and intends to infect Jon next. Damian travels to Smallville where he and Jon escape an infected Lois. Jon uses his heat vision on the Starro spore infecting Lois, freeing her from Starro's control. Damian and Jon travel to the Fortress of Solitude to use its Kryptonian technology to analyze a fragment of the Starro spore intended for Damian. After being mistaken for intruders by Krypto, they meet a holographic copy of Jor-El's consciousness. Jor-El explains that the Starro spores are being controlled by a central hive-mind Starro. Jon and Damian realize that Starro is on the Watchtower and if they take it out it will free everyone who is under control by a spore.

Jon and Damian travel to the Watchtower in the same ship that brought Kal-El to Earth. On the Watchtower, they are apprehended by possessed members of the Justice League and the Teen Titans. Starro explains that he intends to drain the Earth of life after securing control over everyone. Jon's invulnerability manifests when he jumps in front of an arrow fired by the possessed Green Arrow at Damian, and the duo is able to subdue the possessed heroes attacking them. Lois is able to contact Jon from President Lex Luthor's office and tells Jon that Starro is vulnerable to heat. They discover that Starro has grown stronger and Jon's heat vision is no longer enough to destroy him. They resolve to knock the Watchtower out of orbit in the hopes that Starro will burn up with it on re-entry.

After evacuating all of the subdued heroes on a spacecraft back to Earth, they are able to set the Watchtower on a course for re-entry. They are attacked by Starro, but he is injured as the Watchtower begins to burn up on re-entry, causing all Starro spores on Earth to die. Unable to escape from the Watchtower, Damian and Jon admit their respect for each other. Freed from Starro, Superman intercepts the falling Watchtower and rescues Jon and Damian. Starro survives the fall to Earth where he is defeated by Jon, Damian, Batman, and Superman working together.

Afterwards, Damian and Bruce visit the Kent family in Smallville. Jon and Damian discuss a name for themselves before settling on Super-Sons.

== Voice cast ==
- Jack Dylan Grazer as Jonathan Kent / Superboy
- Jack Griffo as Damian Wayne / Robin
- Troy Baker as Bruce Wayne / Batman
- Travis Willingham as Kal-El / Clark Kent / Superman
- Laura Bailey as Lois Lane
- Darin De Paul as Lex Luthor, Starro
- Tom Kenny as Oliver Queen / Green Arrow, The Penguin, Principal Cunningham
- Nolan North as Jor-El
- Zeno Robinson as Jimmy Olsen, Melvin Masters
- Myrna Velasco as Cassie Sandsmark / Wonder Girl, Lara Lor-Van

== Production ==
At the 2021 DC FanDome, DC Entertainment announced that it was working on its first fully-CGI animated film Battle of the Super Sons. Matt Peters directed the film from a screenplay written by Jeremy Adams. The voice cast stars Jack Dylan Grazer, Jack Griffo, Troy Baker and Travis Willingham and features additional voices from Laura Bailey, Darin De Paul, Tom Kenny, Zeno Robinson, Nolan North, and Myrna Velasco.

== Release ==
The film premiered at New York Comic Con on October 7, 2022, and the wide direct-to-video release followed shortly after on October 18, 2022.

== Reception ==
On review aggregator Rotten Tomatoes, the film has been positively reviewed in 100% of nine critic reviews, with an average rating of 7.9/10. Jesse Schedeen at IGN found the film to be fairly predictable yet successful in showing the enjoyable relationship between the young heroes.
