= Jon Kent (DC Comics) =

Comic book superhero

- Jon Kent on the cover of Superman: Son of Kal-El #10 (June 2022). Art by Travis Moore.

Publication information
- Publisher: DC Comics
- First appearance: Convergence: Superman #2 (July 2015)
- Created by: Dan Jurgens

In-story information
- Full name: Jonathan Samuel Kent
- Species: Human/Kryptonian hybrid
- Team affiliations: Legion of Super-Heroes; Superman Family; Justice League; Secret Six; New Titans
- Partnerships: Robin; Superman; Teen Titans
- Notable aliases: Superboy; Superman; Tomorrow Man
- Abilities: Superhuman strength, hearing, speed, stamina, breath and vision; Accelerated healing; Invulnerability; Heat vision; X-ray vision; Freezing breath; Flight

Jon Kent is a superhero appearing in American comic books published by DC Comics. He is the son of the superhero Superman and Daily Planet reporter Lois Lane. Created by Dan Jurgens, the character first appeared in Convergence: Superman #2 (July 2015). Jon is the newest character in the DC Universe who assumed the superhero persona of Superboy, and later taking on the mantle of Superman and Tomorrow Man.

The character has appeared in other media, including the animated film Batman and Superman: Battle of the Super Sons, the TV series Superman & Lois, and the animated series My Adventures with Superman.

== Publication history ==
The character was created by writer/artist Dan Jurgens and first appeared in DC's "Convergence" event in the miniseries Convergence: Superman #2 (July 2015). Half Kryptonian and half-human, Jon is the biological son of post-Crisis Clark Kent / Superman and Lois Lane and the couple's child in DC Comics canon. His parents named him in honor of his grandfathers, Jonathan Kent and Samuel Lane. On the character, Dan Jurgens said: "The way I describe him is that he looks like Clark but has Lois' spitfire attitude and inquisitiveness." Jurgens also explains: "Lots of people might expect Jon to be something like his dad's younger self, but it would be a bit of a mistake. His parents are not Jonathan and Martha Kent. It's Lois and Clark. They're different people with different ways of parenting."

Following "Convergence", he appeared in the eight-issue comic book series Superman: Lois and Clark as a child who begins to develop superpowers of his own. In the DC Rebirth (a continuity established by DC's company-wide relaunch of its comics books in 2016), Jon appears with his parents in Action Comics and Superman when his father becomes the new Superman in DC Comics. Jon's origins are retconned in the story arc "Superman Reborn". In the four-part story, two different versions of Superman and Lois Lane (the New 52 and post-Crisis) are merged into one complete version, creating a new DC Universe and a new origin story for Jon.

Jon is the most recent character in DC Comics to assume the mantle of Superboy. He was officially introduced as Superboy in Superman vol. 4 #6 (Nov. 2016). He co-stars with Damian Wayne in the Super Sons comic books as Superboy and Robin. In 2019, the character joined the Legion of Super-Heroes in the 31st century in the comic book series Legion of Super-Heroes by writer Brian Michael Bendis and artist Ryan Sook.

In 2021, Jon began starring as the protagonist in the comic book series Superman: Son of Kal-El, which temporarily replaced the Superman monthly title. The series, written by Tom Taylor, features Jon protecting the Earth as the new Man of Steel in the DC Universe. Following the conclusion of the series, Taylor wrote the six-issue miniseries Adventures of Superman: Jon Kent in 2023, with art by Clayton Henry.

In October 2021, DC Comics revealed that the character is bisexual and began a romantic relationship with a male friend, Jay Nakamura, a superhero and online activist. On the creative decision, series writer Tom Taylor said: "It's not a gimmick. When I was offered this job, I thought, 'Well, if we're going to have a new Superman for the DC Universe, it feels like a missed opportunity to have another straight white savior.' So, well, this isn't everything to do with them. And there's a reason this is, this is coming in issue five and not issue one. We didn't want this to be 'DC Comics creates new queer Superman,' we want this to be 'Superman finds himself, becomes Superman and then comes out.' And I think that's a really important distinction there." Taylor also stated: "I've always said everyone needs heroes and everyone deserves to see themselves in their heroes and I'm very grateful DC and Warner Bros. share this idea. Superman's symbol has always stood for hope, for truth and for justice. Today, that symbol represents something more. Today, more people can see themselves in the most powerful superhero in comics."

In the series Superman Unlimited, Jon took on a new identity of Tomorrow Man. Following the conclusion of the Kingdom of Zod storyline, Jon as Tomorrow Man began headlining Superman Unlimited from issue #18 onwards. In 2026, Jon joined the superhero team Titans and began starring in the comic book series New Titans.

== Age and appearance ==
Like his father, Superman, Jon has a civilian disguise, which includes a pair of glasses and a baseball cap. He first appeared in his Superboy attire in Superman vol. 4 #2 (Sept. 2016). His Superboy outfit consists of red sneakers, blue jeans, zippered jacket with the "S-shield", and a cape attached to the back.

On designing Jon's Superboy costume, artist Jorge Jimenez said: "I started trying out some of the more classic designs as a mini homage to the classic Superman, but the guys at DC wanted to experiment with something more casual, as those are the designs that have been working better recently. We are also looking at an incomplete "Superboy;" he's not super yet, so it's reasonable to say that if he's only half super, that he should have clothing that's half super. So we started to play around with clothing that I see as popular right now with teenagers. For example, tight ripped jeans, at least in Spain, are very popular right now and I think they give a lot of mobility to the character when I draw him on the page. I've also used a popular shoe design. I must mention that I like putting effort into what I wear personally, so this way I was able to add a bit of myself to the character. The short length of the cape gives it a younger look, and the zipped hoodie... I did that thinking they might make a real version for people to wear. I also think that this aesthetic could make a connection with the younger readers."

It was stated that Jon is 10 years old in Superman vol. 4 #9 (Dec. 2016). During the 2019 story arc "The Unity Saga: The House of El", Jon was aged up to 17 years old and given a new Superboy Kryptonian suit of armor.

== Fictional character biography ==
=== Convergence ===
The birth of Jon in Convergence: Superman#2. Art by Dan Jurgens.

In the 2015 DC Comics "Convergence" storyline, Brainiac gains access to Vanishing Point, which allows him to gain the ability to look back into the histories of the DC Universe. He collects cities and inhabitants from various timelines that have ended, trapping them in domes on a planet outside of time and space. When Flashpoint resets the DC continuity, Superman and Lois from the post-Crisis continuity have been trapped on the planet Telos in Gotham City, with the city being among those sealed in a dome. The couple is trapped in the city for almost nine months, and as Superman's powers are suppressed during this time, he and Lois conceive a child. During the event, Superman manages to get Lois out of danger and into safety and helps her with the birth of their son Jonathan, after she was kidnapped by a mentally unstable Flashpoint Superman. At the end of the Convergence story arc, Superman, Lois, and Jon travel across time and dimensions along with Parallax, the pre-Crisis versions of Supergirl and the Flash, where they can prevent the events of Crisis on Infinite Earths and save the original multiverse. Afterward, with their world no longer existing, Brainiac offers to send Superman and Lois to a universe of their choosing.

=== Superman: Lois and Clark ===
In the series Superman: Lois and Clark, after Convergence, the Kent family arrive during the beginning of the New 52. Superman and his family live in secrecy for many years. Moving to California and adopting new identities, taking the surname "White" (a tribute to Perry White) and keeping a low profile, they stay out of the lives of this world's superheroes, with Lois becoming an anonymous author, while Superman continues his superhero duty quietly behind the scenes. Jon grows up in a normal life with his parents and is unaware of their real identities and secret activities. He begins noticing contradictions in his parents' stories and begins to suspect that his parents are more than they claim. Jon is eventually shown starting to develop superpowers of his own similar to those of his father, Superman. After he and his mother were kidnapped and almost killed by Intergang, his parents finally reveal their true origin to him.

=== DC Rebirth ===
Jon as a child, in his Superboy outfit. Art by Jorge Jimenez.

In June 2016, DC Comics relaunched its entire line of comic books series with DC Rebirth. DC once again re-established the Post-Crisis Superman as the Superman in DC Comics, along with his wife, Lois Lane, and their son Jonathan.

In the "Son of Superman" story arc, the Kent family relocate from California to a farm in Hamilton County. At the farm, Jon tries to save the family cat from a hawk but accidentally kills both animals. Clark decides to take Jon on a mission. Arriving in the Arctic together with his father's encouragement, Jon successfully helps Superman rescue a submarine attacked by an Enteroctopus. Afterward, father and son have a long conversation about superhero responsibilities and that soon Jon will have to embrace the superhero mantle himself.

Back at home, Jon falls off a tree and becomes unconscious. Clark and Lois decide to take him to the Fortress of Solitude. At the Fortress, the Kent family is met by the Eradicator, who informs Superman that he is one of a series of robots created by General Zod to seek out and arrest Kryptonian criminals, extract their life force and transfer them to a Phantom Zone projector, where they will await trial with their bodies placed in cryo-chambers. The Eradicator witnessed the destruction of Krypton. Part of his protocol is finding Kryptonian survivors; he eventually found Superman in the Earth solar system, including his son. The Eradicator tells Superman he can rebuild Krypton, but because his son is half human, his human genome will have to be eradicated for Krypton to stay true and pure. He attempts to ingest Jon, and Superman fights the Eradicator. After some reassurance from his mother (that he has the best of both worlds and has the ability to do great things), Jon joins his father in the fight against the Eradicator. With the combined forces of Superman and son, the Eradicator's outer shell is shattered, releasing the Kryptonian souls he has captured and causing a massive explosion in the Fortress.

Superman and his family are teleported into a bar in Metropolis. The Kryptonian spirits decide to help Superman and allow themselves to be reabsorbed by the Eradicator, while Superman puts Lois and Jon inside a fully equipped submersible and escapes with his family to Batman's secret Batcave on the Moon. The Eradicator soon arrives in the Batcave and continues his battle with Superman. During the battle, the Eradicator absorbs Superman and begins to search for Jon in the cave. Lois finds and puts on Batman's Hellbat armor and battles the Eradicator with Jon joining the fight. Superman eventually escapes the Eradicator. The entire Kent family fight the Eradicator, who is finally destroyed. Later, after returning to the family farm, Clark gives Jon a pair of glasses and a hat as Jon's new civilian disguise. He takes Jon to the Watchtower and officially introduces him as Superboy to the Justice League.

Jon's origins are retconned in the four-part story "Superman Reborn". Jon is kidnapped by Mister Mxyzptlk and taken to the Fifth Dimension. As Superman and Lois race to his rescue, Jon encounters the spirits of the deceased New 52 versions of Superman and Lois and begs them to help. Taking their power in his hands, Jon attacks Mxyzptlk and accidentally transforms his parents into their New 52 counterparts. Though they no longer remember him, Jon manages to get them to remember who they truly are and their love for each other. The two versions of Superman and Lois merge, forming a new, complete version of Superman and Lois and rewriting the DC Universe's history. In this new reality, Clark and Lois conceived Jon shortly after they got married after the death of Superman. Lois ran afoul of a ring of arms smugglers who blew up the Kents' apartment in an attempt on her life. Fearing for Lois's life, the couple left Metropolis, and Lois gave birth to Jon in the Fortress of Solitude. Clark and Lois then took sabbaticals and moved to California to raise Jon. They eventually moved to Hamilton County and went back to work at the Daily Planet.

Jon's return as a teenager in Superman vol.5 #6, art by Ivan Reis.

When Jon's grandfather Jor-El visits the Kent family, he offers to take Jon on a trip to better educate him about the known universe. Lois and Clark initially refuse, but Jon reveals his fears and insecurities to his parents as this could be an opportunity to understand himself better. Lois agrees to go with them. While Lois soon returns to Earth, Jon and Jor-El travel through space for some time until their ship suddenly falls into a black hole. Jon is transported to Earth-3, where he is captured by Ultraman. After being imprisoned in a volcano for years, Jon is eventually rescued by Jor-El and sent back to Earth, finding that while years have passed for him, only a few weeks have passed on Earth since he left.

=== Super Sons ===
Jon and Damian Wayne, the son of Batman, are a dynamic duo in the "Super Sons" comic book series: Super Sons, the 12-issue miniseries Adventures of the Super Sons, and the digital-first series Challenge of the Super Sons. The duo first met in the Superman two-part story "In the Name of the Father" and was described as a prologue to the Super Sons series.

"In the Name of the Father", when Christmas break starts, Jon explores the Dead Man's Swamp. He encounters Maya Ducard and Goliath (sent by Damian to spy on Superboy) and is taken to Gotham City sedated and restricted by Damian, who distrusts him. Batman finds them and orders Damian to release Superboy before an enraged Superman arrives. After a brief confrontation, Batman takes them to the Batcave and runs a diagnosis on Jon's DNA for further analysis. Jon tries to befriend Damian, but Damian taunts him for incinerating the family cat, instigating a fight between them that destroys the genetics lab. Batman and Superman send them to a mountain boot camp where Jon and Damian have to face several tests and challenges. After some initial conflict, the duo eventually learns to work together.

=== Legion of Super-Heroes ===
Following the battle against Rogol Zaar, the last survivors of Krypton, the Houses of El and General Zod gather all the alien political factions in the galaxy to bring an end to their destructive wars and discuss an idea that could ensure lasting peace and safety for the people in the galaxy. When Jon suggests forming a United Planets to maintain peace and stability, much like the United Nations on Earth, the Legion of Super-Heroes appears from a time portal. They have come to the present to ask the creator of the United Planets, Jon Kent, to join the Legion in the 31st century. Initially hesitant, after consulting with Damian, Jon accepts the invitation and goes to the future with Saturn Girl. After spending some time in the 31st century in the Legion of Super-Heroes comic book series, Jon eventually returns to the present day in the Action Comics story arc "The House of Kent".

=== Superman: Son of Kal-El ===
Jon is the protagonist in the comic book Superman: Son of Kal-El, which began publication in July 2021 and ended in December 2022, with 18 issues and one annual. Written by Tom Taylor and art by John Timms, the series features Jon taking over his father's mantle as Superman and being entrusted with the protection of Earth while his father (whose stories take place in Action Comics) is away from Earth. The series premise has been described as "Truth, Justice, and a Better World."

In the series, Jon gives up his secret identity in order to save a group of college students from a school shooter. One of the students, Jay Nakamura, reveals to Jon that he covertly runs a news site known as "The Truth" which exposes secrets that the mainstream media will not report, including the plight of the refugees of Gamorra, an island nation under the dictatorship of president Henry Bendix. Jon becomes an ally of Jay and eventually begins a relationship with him. The series was nominated for the GLAAD Media Award for Outstanding Comic Book at the 34th GLAAD Media Awards.

=== Adventures of Superman: Jon Kent ===
Jon stars in the six-issue miniseries Adventures of Superman: Jon Kent. The comic features Jon crossing over into the world of the Injustice franchise.

=== DC All In ===
Jon appears in the Secret Six limited series. After the "Absolute Power" storyline, Jon, Dreamer, Jay and others are recruited to form a new Secret Six team. At the end of the series, Jon breaks up with Jay Nakamura due to Jay's trauma and desire to avenge his devastated home country of Gamorra, which Jon refuses to assist him in.

Following the events of DC K.O., Jon takes on the identity of Tomorrow Man after an encounter with the time-traveling demon Txyz, intending to forge an identity separate from Superman. Txyz intended to prevent his own death, but inadvertently sets in motion the events that will lead to him being killed in battle with Jon. After Jon beats him in battle, Txyz rewards him by freeing a younger doppelgänger of Jon from the volcano on Earth-3. This younger Jon is later revealed to be the son of Superwoman and Ultraman of Earth-3.

== Powers and abilities ==
The first superpower Jon developed was super hearing. Other powers, invulnerability and superhuman strength began to manifest when Jon and his mother were in mortal danger. Due to Jon's young age, his powers and control often fluctuate with his emotions. It is revealed in Superman vol. 4 #3, because of Jon's unique human and Kryptonian genomes, his powers are still developing and adapting, resulting in a lack of consistency. He can be vulnerable to injury even if all of his other powers are active. Jon's power instability is later revealed to be the manipulation of Manchester Black. Jon's powers are restored to normal after Black is defeated. According to Batman, Jon's mixed biology could have the potential of him becoming more powerful than his father, Superman.

He is shown to have developed: heat vision in Superman vol. 4 #1, X-ray vision in Trinity vol. 2 #1, freezing breath in Superman vol. 4 #10, super speed and enhanced vision in Action Comics #966, super breath in Super Sons #4, flight in Superman vol. 4 #25 and super flare in Super Sons #11. Other powers include superhuman stamina, telescopic vision, microscopic vision, electro-magnetic spectrum vision and accelerated healing. Like his father, Jon is vulnerable to magic and kryptonite.

== Other versions ==
- In the two-part story, Superman: Whatever Happened to the Man of Tomorrow? which told the final story of the Silver Age Superman. After his last battle, Superman removed his powers using gold kryptonite, he settled down and married Lois and lived an anonymous normal life under the alias, Jordan Elliot. He and Lois had a son named Jonathan, who inherited his father's superpowers.
- In the Elseworlds graphic novel Son of Superman, Jon Kent is a 15-year-old boy who never knew his father Clark Kent or that he was the superhero, Superman, as his father disappeared before he was born. When a solar storm's radiation triggers his Kryptonian powers, he learns the truth about his father from his mother Lois Lane. Jon dons a costume inspired by his father's, and later successfully rescues his father from a secret facility where he is being held as a prisoner. Superman reunites with his family. When it's revealed that Lex Luthor was responsible for Superman's capture, Jon teams up with his father to stop Luthor. After a prolonged battle, Luthor is defeated. Superman decides to temporarily retire from being a superhero and focus more on his family. This leaves Jon to be the first of a new generation of superheroes.
- In the New 52 Batman Beyond book, Jon is the Superman of the future, who was put into captivity for study by Brother Eye with the rest of the future Justice League. It is unknown what happened to his father. Jon's costume and role are the same as his father's from his appearance in the Batman Beyond animated series, though Jon is younger than his father was in the series.
- In the 2006 film Superman Returns after Superman returns to Earth after five years, he learns that Lois is engaged to Richard White (the nephew of editor-in-chief Perry White) and the two share a young son, Jason White. When the boy begins to exhibit superpowers, he is revealed to be the son of Superman.
- In John Byrne's Elseworlds comic book series Superman & Batman: Generations, Superman and Lois have two children, Joel and Kara Kent. When Lois was pregnant with her son, Joel, Lex Luthor and the Joker exposed her to gold kryptonite, causing Joel to be born without powers. Their daughter Kara, began developing superpowers at age 6 and eventually took on the superhero identity of Supergirl. Joel gains powers from a formula created by Luthor, and is manipulated into killing his sister before dying from the formula's side effects, leaving his own son to be raised by Batman's son Bruce Wayne Jr.
- In the Elseworlds series JLA: Created Equal, Adam Kent is the son of Lois and Superman and was born shortly after a mysterious plague which nearly kills the entire male population. Adam possesses the same superpowers as his father Superman.
- Clark Kent Jr. first appeared in World's Finest #154 (Dec. 1965). The character has appeared in various stories in DC comics as the son of Superman and Lois Lane.
- Jon Lane Kent is the son of Superman and Lois Lane, born in an alternate New 52 future. He is the genetic template for the New 52 version of the clone Superboy, Kon-El. The character becomes a supervillain and briefly, just before his death, a superhero.
- Boyzarro, the son of Bizarro and Loiz is the mirror image of Superboy. He first appeared in the four-part story "Boyzarro Re-Death". After the destruction of Bizarro World, Boyzarro and other characters in the Bizarroverse, including Robzarro (the mirror image of Robin) relocated to Earth. The character was originally named Bizarro Boy, but creator Patrick Gleason changed his name due to fan suggestions on social media. This allowed for the Super Sons counterpart to later be named Bizarro Boyz.
- On Earth-11, where all characters are gender-flipped, Supergirl Laurel Kent is the daughter of Superwoman and journalist Louis Lane. The character first appeared in DC's Very Merry Multiverse (Dec. 2020). Supergirl, a member of the Teen Justice, stars in the miniseries Multiversity: Teen Justice.
- In the DCeased comic book series set in an alternate Earth, a corrupted version of the Anti-Life Equation has infected most of Earth's inhabitants with a zombie-like virus. When Superman became infected with the virus, Jon became the new Superman. At the end of the first miniseries, the remaining heroes and civilians of Earth, including Jon and his mother Lois, relocate to a new planet. In the sequel series, Jon leads the New Justice League back to Earth to rescue Cyborg and to save the Anti-Living by searching for a cure.

== Graphic novel ==
In a three-part graphic novel series by author Ridley Pearson and artist Ile Gonzalez, Jon Kent and Damian "Ian" Wayne have to work together to save their city from global climate disaster. The first book, Super Sons: The Polarshield Project, was released in April 2019. Book two, Super Sons: The Foxglove Mission, was released in November 2019. The third book, Super Sons: Escape to Landis, was released in October 2020. The novel series is part of the DC Graphic Novels for Kids.

== Picture book ==
An official DC picture book featuring Jon Kent, Who Is Superboy?: An Adventure In Finding Your Way, by Robb Pearlman and illustrated by Ivan Barrera, was released in October 2024.

== Webcomic ==
Beginning in July 2025, a DC webcomic, Jon Kent: This Internship Is My Kryptonite, is published on DC Universe Infinite. An original webcomic for DC GO!, the series is written by Sam Camp and art by Daimon Hampton and Seraji.

== In other media ==
=== Live action ===
==== Arrowverse ====
In the 2019 Arrowverse crossover event "Crisis on Infinite Earths", Clark Kent and Lois Lane have a baby boy named Jonathan, who is born on Krypton's Argo City. Following the Crisis, which reboots the multiverse, Clark and Lois now have two sons.

==== Superman & Lois ====
In the television series Superman & Lois, Clark and Lois have twin sons, Jonathan Kent and Jordan Kent. Jonathan was played by Jordan Elsass for the first two seasons, with Michael Bishop playing the character from season three. Alex Garfin played Jordan in the series. The show is set on an alternate Earth and portrays a different version of the characters that appeared in the Arrowverse.

Jonathan is described as modest and kind-hearted, while Jordan is wildly intelligent with social anxiety. The twins were named after Clark's adoptive and biological fathers, Jonathan Kent and Jor-El. At the start of the series, Jonathan and Jordan are 14-year-old teenagers in high school. After Clark's adoptive mother Martha dies, Clark and Lois move the family from Metropolis to Smallville, where the brothers learn that their father is Superman.

In the first three seasons, Jordan is the only one shown to have their father's superpowers. He has so far developed: heat vision, x-ray vision, freezing breath, accelerated healing, superhuman strength, hearing, speed and durability, the power to expel solar radiation from his body similar to his dad's solar flare ability and the ability to fly. Jordan can also survive without oxygen in the harsh vacuum of space with freezing temperatures and cosmic radiation without the need for protection. It's discovered after being shot with kryptonite that due to being half human, Jordan is not affected by kryptonite the same way full Kryptonians are, with Clark speculating that Jordan's potential might even surpass his own power.

In season 4, Jonathan gains his own superpowers. He seemingly gains all of his Kryptonian powers at once and quickly gets the hang of his new abilities, although he seems to be slightly less skilled in using them more acutely than to Jordan due to his inexperience compared to Jordan's years of practice and training. This combined with failing to save their father from Doomsday leads Jordan to pause his superheroics for a bit, but is forced back into it with the impending threat of Lex Luthor from the family. Though they are not as strong as Clark, the family figures out that the two can be a serious threat if they work together, which allow Clark and John Henry Irons to defeat Doomsday. After Lex is arrested, Clark gives Jordan and Jonathan their own superhero suits to assist him in protecting the world with him and the Irons. The twins grow up, marry, and have several children of their own, and were present during both of their parents' deaths.

In the Bizarro World, first featured in the episode "Bizarros in a Bizarro World", Superman's family are celebrities and a family of heroes. Jonathan has powers instead of Jordan and is known to the world as Jon-El, son of Kal-El, and saving the world with his father. His superhero outfit consists of a black leather jacket and boots, red pants and leather gloves, and a black T-shirt with the "S-shield". However, Jonathan eventually turns against his parents and allies with his uncle Tal-Rho and the cult leader Ally Allston in their effort to take over the world. Jonathan later travels to prime Earth to merge with his other self. After attacking Superman, his family and friends, Bizarro Jonathan is eventually beaten by Jordan. He later escapes prison with the help of Bizarro Lana, but is sent back into government custody when Jordan and Natalie Irons defeat them.

In the Bizarro World, located in an inverse dimension, Jonathan's powers and weaknesses are different from Jordan's. While they have some similar powers, other powers and weaknesses are the complete opposite. Jonathan gains strength and powers from a red sun and kryptonite, while a yellow sun weakens him, and having freeze vision and fire breath instead of heat vision and freezing breath. Although due to being only half-Kryptonian, unlike his father Bizarro, Jon-El does not appear to be weakened by X-kryptonite.

=== Animations ===
==== Teen Titans Go! ====
Jon Kent makes a cameo appearance in the Teen Titans Go! episode "Chicken in the Cradle".

==== Young Justice ====
Jon Kent appears in Young Justice, voiced by Grey DeLisle. He first appears in the third season episode "Home Fires" when his mother Lois brings him to the home of Iris West for a playdate with the children of other superheroes. In the fourth season episode "I Know Why the Caged Cat Sings", Jon is at the Kent farm in Smallville for a family gathering while his parents explain the death of Conner Kent. In the series finale, "Death and Rebirth", Jon reunites with Conner, who is revealed to have survived, and serves as a ring-bearer at his wedding to Miss Martian.

==== Batman and Superman: Battle of the Super Sons ====
Jack Dylan Grazer voiced Jonathan Kent in the animated film Batman and Superman: Battle of the Super Sons (2022). An 11-year-old Jon, the son of Superman, discovers he has superpowers and is thrust into the world of superheroes and supervillains and joins forces with Damian Wayne (Jack Griffo), the son of Batman, to save the planet by becoming the Super Sons they were destined to be.

==== My Adventures with Superman ====
Jon Kent as Superboy in My Adventures with Superman

Jon Kent appears in the animated series My Adventures with Superman, voiced by Darren Criss. The character first appears in season 3. Jon initially came from a dystopian future dominated by Cyborg Superman and is sent back in time by Lex Luthor to change the future and save the world. After helping his family defend Metropolis and defeating Cyborg Superman, Jon returns to the future, only to discover that the new future has been taken over by Luthor.

He returns to the past for the second time (now known as Jonathan Lane) along with his sister Lara Lane. They join forces with Supergirl and Amanda Waller to confront Luthor's biological weapon, the Eradicator. After defeating the Eradicator, Jonathan and Lara return to the future.

=== Video games ===
- Jon Kent appears as a playable character in DC Legends.
- Superboy appears as a playable character in Lego DC Super-Villains, voiced by Yuri Lowenthal.
- Superboy appears as a playable character in DC Worlds Collide.
- Superboy appears in DC Heroes & Villains.

=== Merchandising ===
- Jonathan Kent and Krypto are featured in Kotobukiya ARTFX+ series.
- Superboy and Robin (Super Sons) are part of the DC Icons action figure lines.
- Prime 1 Studio released a Superboy & Robin statue from its DC Comics series.
- McFarlane Toys DC Multiverse line released an action figure based on the Future State Superman (Jon Kent).
- Funko released a Jonathan Kent pop figure from its DC Comics vinyl figures.

== Collected editions ==
Title	Material collected	Published date	ISBN
The Truth	Superman: Son of Kal-El Vol.1 #1-6	May 31, 2022	978-1779515322
The Rising	Superman: Son of Kal-El Vol.1 #7-10, Annual #1	November 29, 2022	978-1779517388
The Battle for Gamorra	Superman: Son of Kal-El Vol.1 #11-15	May 9, 2023	978-1779520074
Superman: Kal-El Returns	Superman: Son of Kal-El #16-18, Action Comics #1047-1049, Superman: Kal-El Returns Special #1	September 5, 2023	978-1779520586
Adventures of Superman: Jon Kent	Adventures of Superman: Jon Kent #1-6	November 14, 2023	978-1779520760
