= Recalled comics =

Comic books have been recalled for various reasons, including simple printing errors, stories or images which were deemed inappropriate, and to avoid potential lawsuits. The rarest of these books is probably The League of Extraordinary Gentlemen, volume 1, issue #5, published by an imprint of DC Comics, which was recalled due to the inclusion of a vintage advertisement for Marvel Douche. Other notable recalled comics are the Elseworlds 80-Page Giant, which originally contained a depiction of baby Superman in a microwave, and Marvel Knights' Elektra issue #3, which contained tame nude images of the title character.

As well as comics with evidence of a genuine recall, there have been a number of comics which the publishers (or distributors) have not recalled, but have allowed to be returned. Comic books have been categorized below, with supporting references, as recalled, returnable, or neither.

All Star Batman & Robin, the Boy Wonder #10, recalled edition

== Verified recalls ==
This section lists notable comics verified by the CGC Collectors Society as having been recalled. They are listed in the Society's Recalled Editions competitive comic book set.

=== Action Comics #869 ===
November 2008, DC Comics: Action Comics #869 is the penultimate issue of the "Brainiac" story arc. The original cover shows Superman and Jonathan Kent outside the Kent farmhouse, drinking from bottles, which could be seen as containing beer, because their labels are unclear. DC issued a statement to retailers that the issue was recalled, and any copies featuring the initial cover should be destroyed. DC reprinted the issue the following week, with the labels on the bottles changed to read SODA POP.

=== All Star Batman & Robin, the Boy Wonder #10 ===
August 2008, DC Comics: All Star Batman & Robin, the Boy Wonder was intended for mature readers. Street thugs use profanity in the comic; in the production process, the curse words were included in the speech balloons, but then blacked out. In the original version of issue #10, the ink used to obscure the objectionable words is a slightly different shade from the ink used to print the words themselves, resulting in the profanity being marginally legible. Series writer Frank Miller commented, "I have no idea how this awful thing happened. It's just one of those terrible and glorious things that happen time to time in publishing .... And my first reaction is simple: I want at least three copies".

=== Elektra, vol. 3, #3 ===
November 2001, Marvel Comics: As printed initially, this comic contained nude images of Elektra, though the panels were carefully drawn to show nothing untoward. Marvel recalled the issue and printed a replacement with underwear drawn on the character. Some 2,000 to 5,000 copies of the recalled version are believed to have survived.

=== Elseworlds 80-Page Giant ===
August 1999, DC Comics: One of the stories in this comic, "Letitia Lerner, Superman's Babysitter", by Kyle Baker and Liz Glass, depicts the super-toddler climbing into a microwave, which spurred DC president Paul Levitz to order a recall of the issue. However, the story was subsequently printed in DC's Bizarro Comics collection. DC reprinted the entire comic, including the story to which Levitz had objected, as DC Comics Presents: Elseworlds 80-Page Giant #1, which went on sale on December 28, 2011.

=== Halle the Hooters Girl #1 ===
January 1998, Cabbage Comics: This tie-in with a national tour of Hooters models was not authorized by the restaurant chain, and Hooters forced Cabbage to recall the comic. The print run was only 2,000 copies. The CGC lists a "Gold Foil Edition" of the issue in addition to a standard version.

=== The League of Extraordinary Gentlemen, vol. 1, #5 ===
June 2000, America's Best Comics: An actual, early 20th-century advertisement for a douche manufactured by the Marvel Co. was reprinted in this issue. America's Best Comics had been acquired by DC, and Paul Levitz worried that the comic could expose the company to litigation from rival Marvel. He ordered the issue recalled, and it was reprinted with the word MARVEL changed to AMAZE. Two hundred copies of the original version are estimated to have escaped the recall. League's writer, Alan Moore, would later reference the episode in Top 10 issue #9 with a newspaper headline reading "Miracle Douche Recall".

=== The Matrix: Comic Book Preview ===
March 1999, Warner Bros.: This promotional comic was intended to be given away to audience members at American showings of The Matrix, but was withdrawn "due to mature content" (despite the film itself being rated R). Quite a few copies seem to have survived, however, and the comic is lower in value than others that have been recalled.

=== Millennium Edition: Mad #1 ===
February 2000, DC Comics: At the beginning of the 21st century, DC reprinted 62 notable issues from the company's history under the umbrella title Millennium Edition. One of these reprints was the first issue of Mad, which was published originally by EC Comics. The initial version of Millennium Edition: Mad #1 (also known as Millennium Edition: Tales Calculated to Drive You Mad #1) only listed DC and its staff, omitting credit to EC and the creators of Mad #1, including William M. Gaines and Harvey Kurtzman. The issue was recalled and the credits corrected.

=== Phonogram: The Singles Club #5 ===
October 2009, Image Comics: This comic was originally printed with a barcode for issue #4. It is estimated that 200 copies of the recalled version exist.

=== Tangled Web #1 ===
June 2001, Marvel Comics: The cover of the first issue of the anthology series Tangled Web (later Spider-Man's Tangled Web) was erroneously printed on matte card stock. The comic was recalled and reprinted with a glossy cover.

=== Universe X: Spidey #1 ===
January 2001, Marvel Comics: In this one-shot, (Note: Despite being a one-shot, this comic is usually referred to as issue #1.) part of the Universe X series, inker Al Milgrom worked into the spines of books on a shelf a message referring to former Marvel editor-in-chief Bob Harras: "Harras—ha ha, he's gone—good riddance to bad rubbish—he was a nasty S.O.B." An editor caught and removed Milgrom's hidden (and potentially libelous) insults, but they were inadvertently restored during the production process. When retailers discovered the message in advance copies, Marvel recalled the comic and reprinted it. Marvel also fired Milgrom, but allowed him to work for the company as a freelancer on the condition that he cover the cost of the recall and reprinting. There are three cover variants of the recalled comic. The offending message was reprinted in the collection Universe X Volume 1, due to what was characterized as an archiving error, but the book was not recalled.

=== Wolverine #131 ===
November 1998, Marvel Comics: Todd DeZago was slated to write three issues of Wolverine, issue #131 being the third. However, he took exception to editor Mark Powers's numerous changes to his script for issue #130, and pulled out of issue #131. DeZago was replaced by Brian K. Vaughan. On one page of Vaughan's script that referred to Sabretooth, Powers crossed out what Vaughan had written and wrote in the word killer, so that Powers's intended phrase was "the killer known as Sabretooth". The script was then faxed to the letterer at Comicraft, who had difficulty reading Powers's handwriting in the fax. As a result, the letterer put in the word kike instead of killer, unaware that the former was an antisemitic slur. The issue was behind its production schedule due to the change in writers, and was not proofread properly before printing. The recalled version of this comic is not particularly rare.

== Returnable comics ==
Publishers have chosen not to recall certain comics, but have issued notices that voluntary returns would be accepted.

=== The Adventures of Superman #596 ===
November 2001, DC Comics: The "Our Worlds at War" storyline depicts the DC Universe facing an existential threat from Imperiex, beginning with an attack on Earth. "Our Worlds at War" spans a large number of titles and one-shots, including The Adventures of Superman issues #593 through #596. In the last of these four comics, Superman surveys the damage done by Imperiex's invasion, and one panel shows the pair of LexCorp skyscrapers in Metropolis burning. The day before the issue was scheduled to ship to retailers, the September 11 attacks occurred. The resemblance between the damaged LexCorp buildings and the Twin Towers of the World Trade Center was unmistakable, and DC announced that it would accept returns of the comic.

=== Conan and the Demons of Khitai #3 ===
December 2005, Dark Horse Comics: As a joke, Tony Harris submitted a cover for Conan issue #24 that featured a woman almost completely nude. In issue #3 of the limited series Conan and the Demons of Khitai, however, editor Scott Allie used Harris's cover as an advertisement for Conan #24. As with previous occasions of nudity in Conan, some retailers objected. Dark Horse chose to print a second run of Conan and the Demons of Khitai #3 with a bikini painted onto the woman in the advertisement, and informed stores that the first printing would be returnable. Conan #24 was printed with the sanitized cover, and also in a limited run of 4,000 with Harris's original cover.

=== Death: The High Cost of Living #3 ===
May 1993, DC Vertigo: Two pages intended to create a spread did not face each other in the initial printing of this issue, so Vertigo corrected and reprinted it.

=== Spider-Man: Reign #1 ===
December 2006, Marvel Comics: Spider-Man: Reign is a four-issue series set three decades into the future, on Earth-70237. The initial printing of the first issue, rated T+ (Teens and Up), includes a panel that depicts an elderly, naked Peter Parker with his genitalia visible, though not in detail. Along with the shipment of this comic, Marvel issued a "content advisory", warning retailers that it "contains an image that may be misinterpreted by some readers as inappropriate", and apologizing "for any inconvenience". Marvel also made the issue returnable. The first printing has two cover variants. For the second printing, shadow was drawn onto Parker in the panel, hiding his body.

=== Venom: Lethal Protector #1 ===
February 1993, Marvel Comics: The cover of issue #1 of the limited series Venom: Lethal Protector, the first title to feature Venom as the main character, shows him in front of red foil webbing over a black background. On a small number of copies, the foil did not adhere properly to the paper, resulting in a solid black background (sometimes with traces of foil). Marvel accepted returns of these comics. The erroneously printed copies are now quite valuable. There is also a very rare variant cover with a white background. Marvel printed an additional, limited run of the issue with gold foil on the covers instead of red, and the white error variant is thought to be a result of the gold foil not sticking to the paper.

== Problems that did not result in recalled or returnable comics ==
=== Action Comics #309 ===
February 1964, DC Comics: The cover story of this issue, "The Superman Super-Spectacular!", features a cameo appearance by President John F. Kennedy. Shortly before the comic's release, Kennedy was assassinated.

=== Doctor Strange: Sorcerer Supreme #15 ===
March 1990, Marvel Comics: The character of Voodoo priestess Marie Laveau (based on the historical figure) appears in several issues of Doctor Strange: Sorcerer Supreme. To depict her on the cover of issue #15, artist Jackson Guice drew from the photograph of Christian singer Amy Grant on the cover of her album The Collection. When the comic was published, Grant objected to implicitly being associated with the occult, and sued Marvel for using her likeness without permission. Marvel and Grant settled out of court.

=== Ka-Zar the Savage #12 ===
March 1982, Marvel Comics: In his June 1982 "Bullpen Bulletins", Marvel editor-in-chief Jim Shooter gave a "Shooter Award" to Chemical Color for "Worst Engraver's Error". According to Shooter, in the story "Belasco...!" in Ka-Zar the Savage issue #12, "an entire panel, a color-hold, was dropped out"; in other words, the panel was blank.

=== Marvel Comics Super Special #27 ===
May 1983, Marvel Comics: Marvel Comics Super Special is a series of high-priced one-shots, mostly film adaptations, published in the 1970s and 1980s. Issue #27 is an adaptation of Return of the Jedi, by Archie Goodwin, Al Williamson, and Carlos Garzón. The comic was scheduled to be put on sale in May 1983 (the exact date has been lost to time), the same month as the film premiere. Return of the Jedi actor Mark Hamill, a comics fan, was surprised to find the issue on sale before the movie's release, and reported this to Lucasfilm. Marvel quickly put a stop to sales until after the premiere, preventing—to some extent—premature disclosure of plot details.

=== The Sandman #18 ===
August 1990, DC Vertigo: A small number of copies were erroneously printed with blue ink instead of yellow in the upper three panels of the first page.

=== The Sandman #19 ===
September 1990, DC Vertigo: In the original printing of this issue, two pages are transposed.
