= Fred Ray =

- Born: Frederic E. Ray, Jr. February 4, 1920 Harrisburg, Pennsylvania, U.S.
- Died: January 23, 2001 (aged 80)
- Areas: Penciller, Inker
- Notable works: Superman

Frederic E. "Fred" Ray, Jr. (February 4, 1920 – January 23, 2001) was an American comic book artist and commercial illustrator best known as the primary Superman cover-artist of the 1940s, whose work helped shape the defining look of the iconic superhero character, and for his more than two decades as artist of the DC Comics feature "Tomahawk". His cover of Superman #14 (Feb. 1942) is one of comics' most famous.

== Biography ==
=== Early career ===
Superman #14 (Feb. 1942). The cover, drawn by Ray, is one of comics' most famous.

Fred Ray was born in Harrisburg, Pennsylvania, to a Jewish family, and began his career while still in high school, influenced by the works of such artists as Howard Pyle, W. H. D. Koerner, Frederick Gruger, and N.C. Wyeth. He later studied at the Pennsylvania Academy of Fine Arts.

At 20, he broke into National Comics, the future DC Comics, with illustrations for two-page text features in Detective Comics #45 and More Fun Comics #61 (both Nov. 1940). He penciled and inked his first feature with the six-page Radio Squad story "Murder in the Street", by writer Jerry Siegel, in More Fun Comics #62 (Dec. 1940). He continued with that detective feature in most issues through #72 (Oct. 1941).

Ray debuted as the Superman cover artist with the one-shot promotional giveaway Superman's Christmas Adventure (1940). Shortly afterward, he drew Superman alongside fellow superheroes Batman and Robin on the cover of the anthology World's Best Comics #1 (undated; released early 1941), and almost simultaneously took over the cover-art duties for DC's two Superman starring titles, beginning with Superman #9 (April 1941) and Action Comics #34 (March 1941). His redesign of the "S" symbol on Superman's costume became one of the defining features of the character's look during the 1930s to 1940s period fans and historians call the Golden Age of Comic Books. Ray drew only one Superman story, the 12-page "I Sustain the Wings", in Superman #25 (Dec. 1943), written by Mort Weisinger while he and Ray were doing their World War II military service. It was reprinted as the lead feature in DC 100 Page Super Spectacular #DC-18 (July 1973). His cover of Superman #14 (Feb. 1942) is one of comics' most famous.

Superman's Christmas Adventure (1940), Ray's first Superman cover

Ray also drew occasional Batman covers for Detective Comics and Batman, and various heroes for covers of the anthology titles Star Spangled Comics and World's Finest Comics.

Ray wrote and drew the jungle-adventure feature "Congo Bill" in DC's Action Comics, beginning with # 39 (Aug. 1941), as well as the Revolutionary War-era feature "Tomahawk", starting with Star Spangled Comics #72 (Sept. 1947). Ray also drew the feature in the solo series Tomahawk that began running simultaneously in late 1950. As well, for a time in 1946, he briefly drew the Sunday edition of the Batman newspaper comic strip distributed by the McClure Syndicate.

=== Later career ===
Ray continued drawing Tomahawk tales for more than two decades, through at least Tomahawk #119 (Dec. 1968), with incidental work appearing in some issues afterward. In 1969, he also began drawing and occasionally scripting anthological war-comics stories in DC's G.I. Combat, Our Fighting Forces, and Our Army at War. Ray's last known comics work was the eight-page anthological story "The Lost Battle", written by Bob Haney, in Tomahawk #139 (April 1972).

Ray, an authority on military uniforms of the Revolutionary War and a consultant to the Smithsonian Institution, also wrote books on American history, including Oh, Say, Can You See (1970), and Alfred R. Waud, Civil War Artist (1974), and additionally wrote, illustrated and published historical booklets on Fort McHenry and "The Star-Spangled Banner"; Fort Niagara; Fort Ticonderoga; Fort William Henry, Lake George, NY; the Alamo; Antietam; the Gettysburg Address, and other topics. He drew covers and interior art for magazines including Civil War Times Illustrated, American History Illustrated, where he served as Art Director for Historical Times, Inc., and for True Frontier, The West and Yank, and designed historical medals and figurines for the Danbury Mint. He was living in Harrisburg, Pennsylvania, at the time of his death at age 80.
