= Bill Finger Award for Excellence in Comic Book Writing =

American comic book award

- Awarded for: Excellence in comic book writing
- Sponsored by: DC Comics, Heritage Auctions, Maggie Thompson
- Country: United States
- Hosted by: San Diego Comic-Con
- First award: 2005
- Website: www.comic-con.org/awards/other/bill-finger-award/

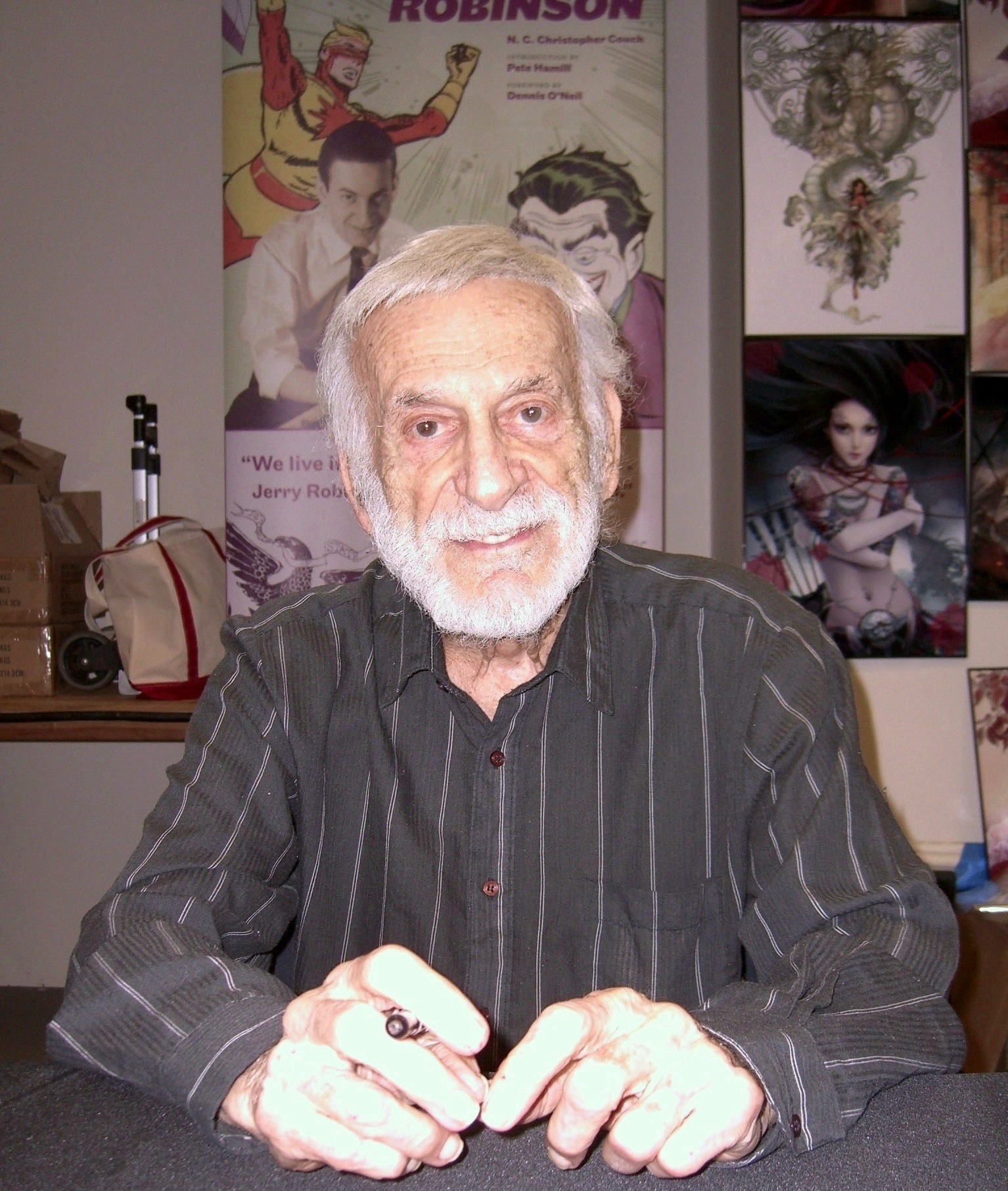
Jerry Robinson (pictured 2011) created the award.

The Bill Finger Award for Excellence in Comic Book Writing is an American award for excellence in comic book writing, presented each year at ComicCon in San Diego. The awards committee, chaired by Mark Evanier, is charged each year with selecting two recipients, one living and one deceased. In 2020 and 2021, when the awards could not be presented in person due to the COVID-19 pandemic there were six deceased honorees each year and no living ones.

The award, along with the Eisner Awards, is presented in July of each year at the annual San Diego Comic-Con. It was established by Bill Finger's colleague and fellow writer Jerry Robinson.

Evanier in 2003 said the premise of the award was "to recognize writers for a body of work that has not received its rightful reward and/or recognition. That was what Jerry Robinson intended as his way of remembering his friend, Bill Finger. Bill is still kind of the industry poster boy for writers not receiving proper reward or recognition."

== Recipients ==
| Year | Living Recipient | Deceased Recipient | Ref. |
|---|---|---|---|
| 2005 | Arnold Drake | Jerry Siegel | |
| 2006 | Alvin Schwartz | Harvey Kurtzman | |
| 2007 | George Gladir | Gardner Fox | |
| 2008 | Larry Lieber | Archie Goodwin | |
| 2009 | Frank Jacobs | John Broome | |
| 2010 | Gary Friedrich | Otto Binder | |
| 2011 | Del Connell | Bob Haney | |
| 2012 | Steve Skeates | Frank Doyle | |
| 2013 | Don Rosa | Steve Gerber | |
| 2014 | Bill Mantlo and Jack Mendelsohn | Robert Kanigher | |
| 2015 | Don McGregor | John Stanley | |
| 2016 | Elliot S. Maggin | Richard E. Hughes | |
| 2017 | William Messner-Loebs | Jack Kirby | |
| 2018 | Joye Hummel Murchison Kelly | Dorothy Roubicek Woolfolk | |
| 2019 | Mike Friedrich | E. Nelson Bridwell | |
| 2020 | None | Virginia Hubbell, Nicola Cuti, Leo Dorfman, Gaylord DuBois, Joe Gill, France Herron | |
| 2021 | None | Robert Bernstein, Audrey "Toni" Blum, Vic Lockman, Robert Morales, Paul S. Newman, Robert "Bob" White | |
| 2022 | Bob Bolling | Don Rico | |
| 2023 | Barbara Friedlander | Sam Glanzman | |
| 2024 | Jo Duffy | Ralph Newman | |
| 2025 | Don Glut | Sheldon Mayer | |
| 2026 | Jenny Blake Isabella | Martin Pasko | |
