= Gaylord DuBois =

American writer (1899–1993)

- Gaylord Du Bois
- Born: Gaylord McIlvaine Du Bois; August 24, 1899 Winthrop, Massachusetts, U.S.
- Died: October 20, 1993 (aged 94) Orange City, Florida, U.S.
- Area: Writer
- Notable works: Western comics Tarzan comics
- Awards: Bill Finger Award 2020 (posthumously)

Gaylord McIlvaine Du Bois (/duːˈbwɑː/; sometimes written DuBois; August 24, 1899 – October 20, 1993) was an American writer of comic book stories and comic strips, as well as Big Little Books and juvenile adventure novels. Du Bois wrote Tarzan for Dell Comics and Gold Key Comics from 1946 until 1971, and wrote over 3,000 comics stories over his career.

An avid outdoorsman, Du Bois had a true affinity for writing stories with natural settings. His forte was in Westerns, as well as jungle comics and animal reality comics. He created many original second features for Western Publishing (e.g., "Captain Venture: Beneath the Sea", "Leopard Girl", "Two Against the Jungle", etc.), but most of his work for the company was in writing stories with licensed characters.

== Comic strips and comic books ==
Among the various genres for which he wrote comic book scripts, most were of the outdoor adventure variety, particularly Westerns, including Red Ryder Comics (for which he wrote "Little Beaver" text pages, The Fighting Yanks WWII feature, and, particularly, the "Kyotee Kids" Western series, 31 scripts, the first being sent to his editor 12/23/1946, the last being sent 3/19/1949, that ran from about issue #43 ending with #72; Du Bois had previously been one of the ghostwriters for the Red Ryder newspaper comic strip drawn by Fred Harman. Before its format change to all-new Red Ryder material, Red Ryder Comics featured Red Ryder newspaper strip reprints.

He also wrote stories for Gene Autry Comics, Roy Rogers Comics (1944–1956, 1959–1960, all of the first run in the Four Color Comics series, and, under its own numbering, Roy Rogers Comics #1 through about #108, and approximately #134 through #143), Zane Grey's King of the Royal Mounted (Du Bois had previously been one of the ghost-writers for the King of the Royal Mounted newspaper comic strip drawn by illustrator Jim Gary), Sergeant Preston of the Yukon, Bat Masterson (adapting Bat Masterson (TV series)), Tales of Wells Fargo / Man from Wells Fargo, Wanted: Dead or Alive, The Rebel, Bonanza and Hotel de Paree Sundance. Gaylord Du Bois also wrote comic book script adaptations of Zane Grey's western novels for the Dell Four Color Series' "Zane Grey's" issues, which achieved its own numbering with #27 as "Zane Grey's Stories of the West." Du Bois wrote the first issue. In total, he wrote 31 of the series' 39 issues.

Du Bois excelled writing animals: he wrote the entire run of The Lone Ranger's Famous Horse Hi-Yo Silver, the entire run of National Velvet under both the Dell and Gold Key imprints, the first 9 issues of Roy Rogers' Trigger, sixty issues of Lassie, plus nine Lassie issues of March of Comics, the last issue of Gene Autry's Champion, as well as the animal adventure back-up features Bullet the dog, Lotor the raccoon, Yukon King the dog, Grey Wolf, Blaze the horse, et al.. He also adapted Owd Bob for Four Color Comics #729.

Du Bois created several American Indian features: "Young Hawk" ran as a back-up feature in Dell's The Lone Ranger #11-#145 (1949–1962). It had first begun in The Funnies, and then appeared in New Funnies, both in 1942. Since Du Bois's pre-1943 Account Books were lost in a house fire, we can only guess that he created Young Hawk. Turok, Son of Stone was created by Du Bois, originally as a Young Hawk one-shot, but Young Hawk and Little Buck were renamed to be Turok and Andar. (Du Bois wrote the first 8 issues.) He also created the American Indian feature The Chief, the first issue of which debuted in Four Color #290, August, 1950. It assumed its own numbering with #2, April, 1951. The title changed to Indian Chief with #3, August, 1951. Gaylord Du Bois wrote all or nearly all the stories for the first four issues. (His stock of remaining scripts were used in at least three later issues (#12,13, and one other), but they mostly appeared in "Indian Chief" issues of March of Comics.) In Hi-Yo Silver, the recurring human character is Keenay, an American Indian.

Du Bois's early comic-book -writing career included many cartoon characters, including Raggedy Ann, Andy Panda, Our Gang, Tom and Jerry and Uncle Wiggily. Additionally he wrote scripts for Dell Junior Treasury (2,3,4,5,6,8), Santa Claus Funnies, Frosty the Snowman, Walt Scott's Little People, The Littlest Snowman, Jungle Jim, Space Family Robinson (which spawned Lost in Space TV show) (Gaylord Du Bois became the sole writer of Space Family Robinson once he began chronicling the Robinsons' adventures with Peril on Planet Four in issue #8. He had already begun the Captain Venture second feature beginning with Situation Survival in issue #6.) Du Bois also chronicled the adventures of his own creations, e.g. Turok, Son of Stone, Brothers of the Spear, and Jungle Twins.

Gaylord Du Bois wrote script adaptations to comic book form of motion pictures, for the Dell Four Color Series "Movie Classics" issues. His movie adaptations included: Robin Hood (Disney-Movie) (Four Color #413, 1952), Quentin Durward (Four Color #672, 1956), The Animal World (Four Color #713, 1956), Around the World in Eighty Days (Four Color #784, 1957), The Story of Mankind (Four Color #851, 1958), Seventh Voyage of Sinbad (Four Color #944, 1958), Last Train from Gun Hill (Four Color #1012, 1959), The Horse Soldiers (Four Color #1048, 1959), Solomon and Sheba (Four Color #1070, 1959), Spartacus (Four Color #1139, 1960), The Story of Ruth (Four Color #1144, 1960), North to Alaska (Four Color #1155, 1960), Master of the World (Four Color #1157, 1961), Dondi (Four Color #1176, 1962), Pepe (Four Color #1194, 1961); and Lord Jim (Gold Key #10156-509, 1965). Additionally, he wrote adaptations to comic book form of the TV series Marlin Perkins' Zoo Parade, and Lowell Thomas' High Adventure.

He also wrote many one-shot comics, including the Dell Giant comics Abraham Lincoln, Moses and the Ten Commandments, and The Treasury of Dogs that won him the Thomas Alva Edison Award in 1956.

A devout Christian, Du Bois co-authored Biblical Cartoons from Daily Life! with Phil Saint in 1981. Du Bois came out of retirement to co-create and write the Christian comic character Bukki in Aida-Zee #1, published in 1990, and in Christian Comics & Games Magazine #0 in 1995, both by The Nate Butler Studio. The latter magazine was noted for containing "the last completed comic-book script of Gaylord DuBois, one of the most prolific comics writers of all time."

== Books ==
Du Bois wrote The Lone Ranger (the first novel adapting the popular radio character), 35 Big Little Books, five Little Blue Books, at least eight boys' adventure novels and several other ghost-written novels and biographies. The Little Blue Books penned by Du Bois in the late 1920s include #997 Simple Recipes for Home Cooking, #1105 Pocket Dictionary Spanish-English English Spanish, #1109 Spanish Self Taught, #1207 French Self Taught, #1222 Easy Readings in Spanish, and an article in #1270. Little Blue Books Indexed by Author, Corvallis Oregon, 2006.

Big Little Books included Tailspin Tommy (under the name Hal Forrest, the cartoonist who originally co-created the character), Tom Mix, Gene Autry, The Lone Ranger, Pilot Pete, Buck Jones, Clyde Beatty and many others under his own name and using pen name Buck Wilson.

Adventure novels included the Don Winslow of the Navy series ghostwritten for Frank V Martinek, based on Martinek's comic strip, Barry Blake, The Lone Rider, and The Lone Ranger. A series of books co-written with Oskar Lebeck includes Hurricane Kids on the Lost Island; Rex, King of the Deep; and Stratosphere Jim.

Du Bois wrote several adaptations of well known titles such as Tom Sawyer, Huckleberry Finn, Little Women, Kidnapped for his editor at Western Publishing; and The Pony Express, a series of historical word sketches, with color illustrations.

Two Golden Press adaptations appeared in 1960: Kidnapped, based on the novel by Robert Louis Stevenson (Golden Press. 1960. 58 pages). A Golden Reading Adventure. #378. Nomads of the North. Based on the book by James Oliver Curwood. Story adapted from the 1961 Walt Disney film Nikki, Wild Dog of the North (Golden Press. 1960. 60 pages. # 379:100).

== Poetry ==
DuBois published several books of his spiritual poems and biographical material in the 1980s:

- Walk Among the Poems of Gaylord Du Bois (1982, Eyrie Publications)
- The Shining Path: Highlights of a Christian Pilgrimage (1983) — Christian poems
- Reflections on the Eyrie (1984) — poems
- A Walk Around Whallons Bay, New York With Gaylord Du Bois (1984, Eyrie Publications) — letters from Du Bois to friend Glenn Morris (the editor) who arranged the correspondence into a narrative form presenting Du Bois' memories and recollections of people, places and events in the Whallons Bay area where he grew up.

== Awards ==
DuBois was posthumously awarded the Bill Finger Award in 2020 along with fellow honorees Virginia Hubbell, Nicola Cuti, Leo Dorfman, Joe Gill, and France Herron.
