= Virginia Hubbell =

Virginia Hubbell Bloch (March 23, 1914 – April 15, 2006) was a writer for Lev Gleason Publications, MLJ Comics, and Dell Comics during the Golden Age of Comics.

== Career ==
After attending Boston University and New York University, she settled in Woodstock in 1943 with her first husband, Carl Hubbell, and they worked in the comics industry for years. Under the name Virginia Hubbell she wrote much of the later content of Charles Biro's Daredevil and Boy Comics, as well as the notorious Crime Does Not Pay.

After the war, she wrote for the Good Comics (1953), Marvel Comics (1955) and St. John Publications (1955). From 1957, she wrote the series Little Lulu for Dell Comics as the successor to John Stanley.

In recent years, she is known to have written an award-winning play, and several children's books, including Georgie Gray Mouse with Helen Fletcher, under the name Virginia Hubbell.

Virginia Bloch died on April 15, 2006, aged 92. Bloch was posthumously awarded the Bill Finger Award in 2020 along with fellow honorees Leo Dorfman, Nicola Cuti, Gaylord DuBois, Joe Gill, and France Herron.
