= Tomahawk (character) =

American comic book character

- Tomahawk #15 (Jan./Feb. 1953), cover art by Bob Brown.

Publication information
- Publisher: DC Comics
- First appearance: Star Spangled Comics #69 (June 1947)
- Created by: Joe Samachson; Edmond Good

In-story information
- Full name: Tom Hawk (also given as Thomas Hawk, Tom Hawkins and Tom Haukins)
- Species: Human
- Place of origin: Earth
- Team affiliations: Tomahawk's Rangers
- Abilities: Tomahawk is well versed in American Indian languages and customs from many tribes. He is an excellent hand-to-hand fighter, and well versed in the weapons of the era. He has a keen deductive ability and is an excellent horseman.
Tomahawk
Publication information
- Publisher: DC Comics
- Schedule: Bimonthly: #1-20, #57-140; Eight Times a Year: #21-56
- Format: Ongoing series
- Genre: Western
- Publication date: Sept./Oct. 1950 – May/June 1972
- No. of issues: 140
- Main character: Tomahawk
Creative team
- Written by: Ed France Herron
- Artist: Fred Ray

Tomahawk is an American comic book character whose adventures were published by DC Comics from the late 1940s to the early 1970s, first as a backup feature in Star Spangled Comics and World's Finest Comics and later in his own eponymous series. He was created by writer Joe Samachson and artist Edmond Good, and first appeared in Star-Spangled Comics #69 (June 1947). The Tomahawk series is set during the American Revolutionary War.

== Publication history ==
Tomahawk was a backup feature in Star Spangled Comics from his first appearance, issue #69 (June 1947) to issue #130 (July 1952), and in World's Finest Comics from issue #33 (Mar. 1948) until issue #101 (May 1959).

The Tomahawk series premiered in September 1950, and lasted 140 issues, until June 1972. Most stories during this period were by writer France Herron and artist Fred Ray. The last ten issues of Tomahawk were titled Son of Tomahawk, featuring the character's son, Hawk Haukins, but the change did not slow the dropping sales which led to the book's cancellation.

== Fictional character biography ==
Known as either Tom Hawk or Thomas Haukins, Tomahawk was a soldier who served under George Washington in the warfare between the British, French and Iroquois forces during the decades prior to the American Revolutionary War. He acquired his nickname due to the resemblance between his birth name and the tomahawk, a weapon used by the Iroquois. He is assisted by a young white friend, Dan Hunter.

Tomahawk achieved further fame as one of Washington's most capable operatives during the Revolutionary War, leading a band of soldiers under the informal nickname of "Tomahawk's Rangers". In issues #35 and #36, Tomahawk met a young Davy Crockett. This was an anachronism, as the real Crockett was not born until after the Revolutionary War.

Issue #81 introduced Miss Liberty (Bess Lynn), a patriotic-themed superhero who would make several more appearances in the series. The World War II era superheroine Liberty Belle is her descendant.

In the Time Masters mini-series, it was established that Dan Hunter is Rip Hunter's cousin. Dan traveled back in time to stop the Illuminati during the Revolutionary War and decided to stay in the past.

In 1998, Tomahawk appeared in a Vertigo Visions one-shot, written by Rachel Pollack. This issue retold his origin.

In 2008, he is featured in Bruce Jones' The War that Time Forgot.

During his quest to find a special stone, Haukins met and married an Apache princess named Moon Fawn, with whom he had two sons; Hawk and Small Eagle.

A new version of Tomahawk appeared in All-Star Western, Vol. 3, #13.

== In other media ==
- A character based on Tomahawk appears in Swamp Thing, voiced by Harvey Atkin. This version is a Native American ally of the eponymous character.
- Tomahawk appears in Justice League: Crisis on Infinite Earths.
