= Super-Sons =

DC Comics characters

Super Sons
- Cover of World's Finest Comics #215 (January 1973).

Publication information
- Publisher: DC Comics
- First appearance: World's Finest Comics #215 (January 1973)
- Created by: Bob Haney; Dick Dillin

In-story information
- Alter ego: Clark Kent Jr. Bruce Wayne Jr.
- Species: Human/Kryptonian; Human
- Place of origin: Earth-One (Pre-Crisis computer simulations); Earth-216; Earth-154 (Infinite Crisis); Earth-16 (Post-Infinite Crisis)
- Abilities: Clark Kent Jr.: Abilities equivalent to those of Superman, but at half the power level Bruce Wayne Jr.: No superhuman powers; highly trained fighter and athlete, armed with Batman-type gadgets

The Super-Sons are a pair of superheroes appearing in American comic books published by DC Comics. The characters were created by Bob Haney and Dick Dillin and first appeared in World's Finest Comics #215 (January 1973). The characters were featured in stories about the sons of Superman and Batman.

In 2017, DC Comics launched a Super Sons monthly comic book series featuring new versions of the characters, going by the names Superboy (Jonathan Kent, the son of Superman and Lois Lane), and Robin (Damian Wayne, the son of Batman and Talia al Ghul).

== Publication history ==
The Super-Sons first appeared together in World's Finest Comics #154 (December 1965). Batman's imaginary son was seen first in Batman #131 (April 1960), Batman #145 (February 1962) and Batman #163 (May 1964). The Super-Sons, Superman Jr. (Clark Kent Jr.) and Batman Jr. (Bruce Wayne Jr.), were college-aged versions of their superhero fathers. Their mothers are never referred to by name, nor are their faces ever shown. The Super-Sons look almost exactly like their fathers and wear identical costumes. The characters spoke with a slightly exaggerated version of the slang popular in the late 1960s and early 1970s. They regard each other as brothers since both understand the pressures involved in being the son of a living legend. Like his father, Batman Jr. has no superhuman powers and relies on athletic prowess and gadgets. Superman Jr., who is only half-Kryptonian, has power levels of only half that of his father.

Although the very first Super-Sons appearance stated that these were actual stories in the lives of Superman and Batman, the final story in World's Finest #263, "Final Secret of the Super-Sons", written by Dennis O'Neil, revealed that the Sons were computer simulations and never existed.

They later inspired the characters Joel Kent and Bruce Wayne Jr. in the three Superman & Batman: Generations comic book series.

A Super-Sons story by Bob Haney was published in the comic special Elseworlds 80-Page Giant (1999). In "Elseworlds" tales, "heroes are taken from their usual settings and put into strange times and places – some that have existed, and others that can't, couldn't or shouldn't exist". Eventually, the Super-Sons reality would be named Earth-216 and designated a Hypertime reality unaffected by the Crisis.

The Earth-154 variant of the Super-Sons (and their fathers) appear briefly during the Infinite Crisis limited series, during which time Alexander Luthor Jr. of Earth-Three warps reality in an attempt to restore the multiverse. Their planet and countless other Earths later contract into a single "New Earth". In the limited series 52, it is revealed that 52 identical parallel universes were created. During his attempt to consume the multiverse, Mister Mind alters each of the parallel worlds, creating distinct histories for each. According to DC Nation #89, one of these worlds is Earth-16, home of the Super-Sons.

In September 2011, The New 52 rebooted DC's continuity. In this new timeline, the Super-Sons (Chris Kent as Superman and Damian Wayne as Batman) reside on Earth-16 as members of the Just—the sons and daughters of the classic JLA who have inherited a crimeless, utopian universe and so live as idle celebrities.

== Publication history ==
Title	Issue	Date	Writer	Artist(s)
Superman and Batman: Saga of the Super Sons	World’s Finest Comics #215	January 1973	Bob Haney	Dick Dillin, Henry Scarpelli
Superman, Batman and their Super-Sons: Little Town with a Big Secret	World’s Finest Comics #216	March 1973	Bob Haney	Dick Dillin, Murphy Anderson
(Part One is untitled); Part Two: "The People Without Shadows"; Part Three: Children of the Universe
Cry Not For My Forsaken Son	World’s Finest Comics #221	February 1974	Bob Haney	Dick Dillin, Murphy Anderson
Part 1: Sharper Than A Serpent’s Tooth; Part 2: Rendezvous on Massacre Island; Part 3: Just an Ordinary Hero
Superman Junior and Batman Junior: Evil in Paradise	World’s Finest Comics #222	April 1974	Bob Haney	Dick Dillin, Vince Colletta
(Part 1 is untitled); Part 2: The Human Test Tube; Part 3: Who the Killer, Who the Prey?
Superman and Batman: The Shocking Switch of the Super Sons	World’s Finest Comics #224	June/July 1974	Bob Haney	Dick Dillin, Vince Colletta
Part 1: A Chasm So Wide...! Part 2: The Mighty Marauder; Part 3: The Breath of Death
Superman, Batman and their Sons, co-starring Robin: Crown for a New Batman	World’s Finest Comics #228	March 1975	Bob Haney	Dick Dillin, Tex Blaisdell
Part 1: Avenge Thy Father; Part 2: The Riddle of Smoke Island; Part 3: Tomb of Ice
Superman and Batman and their Sons: The Girl Whom Time Forgot	World’s Finest Comics #230	May 1975	Bob Haney	Curt Swan, Tex Blaisdell
Part 1: What the Satellite Saw; Part 2: The Silent City; Part 3: Sins of the Fathers
Superman, Batman and their Super Sons: Hero is a Dirty Name	World’s Finest Comics #231	July 1975	Bob Haney	Dick Dillin, Tex Blaisdell
Part 1: Fathers on Trial; Part 2: Unwelcome Allies; Part 3: The Weather Bomb
Superman & Batman and their Super-Sons: World Without Men	World’s Finest Comics #233	October 1975	Bob Haney	Dick Dillin, John Calnan
Part 1: Big Sister is Watching You; Part 2: The Greatest Hate
Superman, Batman and their Super Sons: The Angel with a Dirty Name	World’s Finest Comics #238	June 1976	Bob Haney	Dick Dillin, John Calnan
Part One: Those Who Play the Puppets; Part Two: The Plague Giants; Part 3: Between Two Worlds
The Super Sons of Superman and Batman: Town of the Timeless Killers	World’s Finest Comics #242	December 1976	Bob Haney	Ernie Chan, John Calnan
Part 1: Trio of Fear; Part 2: He Whom Evil Fights; Part 3: The Epitaph that Saved a Superman
Superman and Batman: Final Secret of the Super Sons	World’s Finest Comics #263	July 1980	Dennis O'Neil	Rich Buckler, Dick Giordano
Superman Jr. is no More!	Elseworlds 80-Page Giant #1	June 1999	Bob Haney	Kieron Dwyer

=== Collected edition ===
In December 2007, DC Comics published a trade paperback collection of the series entitled Superman/Batman: Saga of the Super Sons. It collects the stories from: World's Finest Comics #215–216, 221–222, 224, 228, 230, 231, 233, 238, 242, and 263 and Elseworlds 80-Page Giant #1. The story in World's Finest Comics #263 is written by Dennis O'Neil, all the others by Bob Haney. ISBN 1-4012-1502-5

== Super Sons (2017) ==
Superboy and Robin on the cover of Super Sons #10, art by Jorge Jimenez.

DC Comics presented a new version of the Super Sons in 2017. The two central characters are Damian Wayne, son of Bruce Wayne and Talia al Ghul, and Jonathan Kent, son of Clark Kent and Lois Lane. Damian is 13 years old, while Jonathan is initially 10 years old. The advance releases describe them as "best frenemies forever" who will save the world together "if they don't kill each other first". The series was launched in February 2017 and ended in May 2018 with 16 issues and one Annual.

Adventures of the Super Sons, a 12-issue miniseries serves as a continuation of the Super Sons series, with Peter Tomasi as the writer and art by Carlo Barberi and Art Thibert. The first issue was released in August 2018, while the final issue was released in July 2019.

DC Comics released a digital-first series, Challenge of the Super Sons, from December 2020 to April 2021.

They were also featured in four one-shot stories: Superman & Robin Special (2022), "Back to School" (DC's Saved by Belle Reve anthology) (2022), "Trick or Treat" (DC's Terrors Through Time anthology) (2022), and Flash #797 (2023). Damian and Jon appear as adults in Tom King's Wonder Woman (2023), in a series of back up stories that take place many years in the future.

Superman (2018) issue #16 features the reunion of the Super Sons. This issue marks their first meeting since Jon spent five years on Earth-Three and aged into a teenager, significantly altering their dynamic. Superman #16 is later collected in the trade paperback Superman Vol. 3: The Truth Revealed.

Bizarro versions of the Super Sons named Robzarro and Boyzarro, collectively known as the Bizarro Boyz, appear in the four-part story "Boyzarro Re-Death". Both the team name and character names were influenced by fans on social media.

Another alternate version appeared in the DCeased comic book series, in a world where a corrupted version of the Anti-Life Equation has infected most of Earth's inhabitants with a zombie-like virus.

Adventures of Superman: Jon Kent also featured a version of the Super Sons, where Prime Earth's Jon Kent teamed up with Damian Wayne from the world of Injustice.

=== Collected editions ===
Title	Material collected	Pages	Publication date	ISBN
Super Sons Vol. 1: When I Grow Up	Super Sons #1–5	128	October 17, 2017	978-1401274016
Super Sons Vol. 2: Planet of the Capes	Super Sons #6–10	121	March 13, 2018	978-1401278465
Super Sons of Tomorrow	Super Sons #11–12, Superman (vol. 4) #37–38, Teen Titans (vol. 6) #15	124	July 3, 2018	978-1401282394
Super Sons Vol. 3: Parent Trap	Super Sons #13–16, Annual #1	135	October 2, 2018	978-1401284466
Super Sons Omnibus	Super Sons #1–16, Annual #1; Superman (vol. 4) #10–11, 37–38; Teen Titans (vol. 6) #15; DC Rebirth Holiday Special #1	608	December 24, 2018	978-1401285579
Adventures of the Super Sons Vol. 1: Action Detectives	Adventures of the Super Sons #1–6	144	April 16, 2019	978-1401290580
Adventures of the Super Sons Vol. 2: Little Monsters	Adventures of the Super Sons #7–12	144	November 26, 2019	978-1401295073
Super Sons Omnibus: Expanded Edition	Super Sons #1–16, Annual #1; Superman (vol. 4) #10–11, 37–38; Teen Titans (vol. 6) #15; DC Rebirth Holiday Special #1; Adventures of the Super Sons #1–12	888	November 24, 2020	978-1779506665
Challenge of the Super Sons	Challenge of the Super Sons #1-7	168	March 29, 2022	978-1779515100
Super Sons Omnibus Super Duper Edition	Super Sons #1-16, Annual #1; Super Sons/Dynomutt Special #1; Adventures of the Super Sons #1-12; Challenge of the Super Sons #1-7; Superman (vol. 4) #10–11, 37–38; Teen Titans (vol. 6) #15; and "My Best Friend", a story from Robin 80th Anniversary 100-Page Super Spectacular #1	1056	October 31, 2023	978-1779524065
Super Sons: The Complete Collection Book One	Super Sons #1-14, Annual #1, Super Sons/Dynomutt #1, Superman (vol.4) #10-11, #37-38, Teen Titans (vol. 6) #15, and a story from DC Rebirth: Holiday Special #1.	552	June 18, 2024	978-1779525963
Super Sons: The Complete Collection Book Two	Super Sons #15-16, Adventures of Super Sons #1-12, Challenge of the Super Sons #1-7, and "My Best Friend", a story from Robin 80th Anniversary 100-Page Super Spectacular #1	504	November 11, 2025	978-1799503200

== Graphic novel ==
The Super Sons, Jon Kent and Damian "Ian" Wayne, are featured in a three-part graphic novel series by author Ridley Pearson and artist Ile Gonzalez. The first book, Super Sons: The Polarshield Project was released in April 2019. Book two, Super Sons: The Foxglove Mission was released in November 2019. The third book Super Sons: Escape to Landis was released in October 2020.

== In other media ==
- A reimagining of the "Super Sons" appears in the television series Superman & Lois, in which Lois and Clark's teenage sons, Jonathan Kent and Jordan Kent, are played by Jordan Elsass and Alex Garfin.
- Batman and Superman: Battle of the Super Sons (2022) is a CG-animated film starring Jack Dylan Grazer as Jonathan Kent and Jack Griffo as Damian Wayne, who join forces to save the planet by becoming the Super Sons that they were destined to be. Part of the DC Universe Animated Original Movies, it was released by Warner Bros. Animation in October 2022.
