= Leo Dorfman =

American comic book writer (1914–1974)

- Dorfman being interviewed on the game show Two for the Money
- Born: February 17, 1914 New York City. U.S.
- Died: July 9, 1974 (aged 60)
- Area: Writer
- Pseudonyms: Geoff Brown, David George
- Notable works: Action Comics; Superboy; Superman; Superman's Girl Friend, Lois Lane; Superman's Pal Jimmy Olsen
- Awards: Bill Finger Award 2020 (posthumously)

Leo Dorfman (February 17, 1914 – July 9, 1974) (also credited as Geoff Brown and David George) was an American writer of comic books throughout the Silver Age. Although the majority of his work was for DC Comics, he also wrote for Dell Comics and Gold Key Comics.

== Early life ==
Dorfman grew up on New York City's Lower East Side in the southeastern part of Manhattan.

== Career ==
Leo Dorfman began working for National Periodical Publications, the predecessor to DC Comics, in the 1950s. Comics historian Mark Evanier has estimated that Dorfman may have been "the most prolific scripter" for Superman during the 1960s.

Dorfman's work included the creation of the Superman supporting character Pete Ross in 1961 as well as writing the "Superman Red/Superman Blue" story in Superman #162 (July 1963), which inspired a year-long plot arc in 1998. As the writer of Superman's Girl Friend, Lois Lane, he and artist Kurt Schaffenberger crafted Catwoman's first appearance in the Silver Age of Comic Books in issue #70 (Nov. 1966) and updated Lois Lane's fashions to a then-more contemporary look in #80 (Jan. 1968). Dorfman also modernized Jimmy Olsen, making him a more independent figure who solved crimes as "Mr. Action", with less help from Superman. Dorfman wrote World's Finest Comics #175 (May 1968) which featured Neal Adams' first Batman story. In 1971, Dorfman created the Ghosts anthology series for DC.

He produced stories for Gold Key Comics' supernaturally-themed The Twilight Zone, Ripley's Believe It or Not!, Boris Karloff Mystery and Grimm's Ghost Stories. One of Gold Key's editors at the time told Mark Evanier "Leo writes stories and then he decides whether he's going to sell them to DC [for Ghosts] or to us. He tells us that if they come out good, they go to us and if they don't, they go to DC. I assume he tells DC the opposite."

Leo Dorfman died unexpectedly on July 9, 1974, at the age of 60 while still writing for Ghosts. Editor and longtime friend Murray Boltinoff replaced Dorfman with Carl Wessler as the series' primary writer. Dorfman's final comics stories were published posthumously in The Superman Family #170 (April–May 1975), The Unexpected #170 (November–December 1975), and DC Special Series #7 (1977).

== Awards ==
Dorfman was posthumously awarded the Bill Finger Award in 2020 along with fellow honorees Virginia Hubbell, Nicola Cuti, Gaylord DuBois, Joe Gill, and France Herron.

== Bibliography ==
=== DC Comics ===
- Action Comics #288–289, 292–325, 327–333, 335, 337, 340, 345–346, 348–350, 354–359, 362–366, 369–372, 374–376, 379–382, 389, 393–404, 406, 411, 413, 417–418 (1962–1972)
- Adventure Comics #313 (Superboy), 387–388, 392, 396 (Supergirl) (1963–1970)
- DC Special Series #7 (1977)
- Ghosts #1–10, 13, 17–20, 25–30, 32, 34, 36–37, 40 (1971–1975)
- Limited Collectors' Edition #C–32 (1975)
- Secrets of Sinister House #18 (1974)
- Superboy #111, 118–119, 122–124, 132, 134, 137, 139, 146, 148, 173, 175–184, 186–192, 194, 196 (1964–1973)
- Superman #152, 160–162, 168, 171, 173, 176–182, 185–186, 203, 210, 218–219, 221, 225–226, 228–229 (1962–1970)
- The Superman Family #164, 167, 170 (Jimmy Olsen) (1974–1975)
- Superman's Girl Friend, Lois Lane #31–32, 35–38, 40–43, 50, 53–55, 57, 61–64, 66–67, 69–71, 73–76, 78, 80–82, 84–85, 87, 89, 94, 96, 101 (1962–1970)
- Superman's Pal Jimmy Olsen #52, 59–64, 66–69, 74–76, 78–79, 81–84, 86, 91–94, 96–98, 100, 102–103, 106, 108, 115, 119–121, 123–127, 129–130, 132, 154–163 (1961–1974)
- The Unexpected #149, 157, 170 (1973–1975)
- The Witching Hour #36, 45 (1973–1974)
- World's Finest Comics #160, 164, 171, 175, 183 (1966–1969)

=== Dell Comics ===
- Four Color #794, 800, 831, 910, 1173, 1288 (1957–1962)
- Lone Ranger #78 (1954)
- Roy Rogers Comics #84 (1954)
- The Twilight Zone #01860–207, #12–860–210 (1962)

=== Fawcett Comics ===
- Fawcett Movie Comic #20 (1952)
- Motion Picture Comics #105, 109–110 (1951–1952)

=== Gold Key Comics ===
- Boris Karloff Tales of Mystery #4–5 (1963)
- Boris Karloff Thriller #1 (1962)
- Doc Savage #1 (1966)
- G-8 and His Battle Aces #1 (1966)
- Gunsmoke #1 (1969)
- Judge Colt #2–4 (1970)
- Lassie #65–66 (1966)
- M.A.R.S. Patrol Total War #1–10 (1965–1969)
- Mystery Comics Digest #2, 6, 18–19, 23–24 (1972–1975)
- Ripley's Believe It or Not! #22, 25, 27 (1970–1971)
- The Twilight Zone #1–2, 5, 12, 14–18, 20 (1962–1967)
- UFO Flying Saucers #1 (1968)

Preceded by Robert Bernstein	Superman's Pal Jimmy Olsen writer 1961–1970	Succeeded by Jack Kirby
Preceded by n/a	Ghosts writer 1971–1975	Succeeded by Carl Wessler
Preceded by John Albano	Superman's Pal Jimmy Olsen writer 1972–1974	Succeeded by n/a
Preceded by n/a	"Jimmy Olsen" feature in The Superman Family writer 1974–1975	Succeeded by Cary Bates
