= Dick Dillin =

American comics artist (1928–1980)

- Dick Dillin from The Amazing World of DC Comics #11 (March 1976)
- Born: Richard Allen Dillin; December 17, 1928 Watertown, New York, U.S.
- Died: March 1, 1980 (aged 51)
- Area: Penciller
- Notable works: Blackhawk; Justice League of America; World's Finest Comics

Richard Allen Dillin (December 17, 1928 – March 1, 1980) was an American comics artist best known for a 12-year run as the penciler of the DC Comics superhero-team series Justice League of America. He drew 115 issues from 1968 until his death in 1980.

== Early life and career ==
Blackhawk #74 (March 1954). Cover art by Dillin (pencils) and Chuck Cuidera (inks)

Dick Dillin was born in Watertown, New York. Determined since childhood to draw for comics, Dillin graduated from Watertown High School to become an art student at Syracuse University on the G.I. Bill, following his military service with the 8th U.S. Army in Tokyo, Yokohama, and Okinawa.

Dillin eventually did art for Fawcett Comics (on features including "Lance O'Casey" and "Ibis the Invincible" in Whiz Comics) and Fiction House ("Buzz Bennett", "Space Rangers") led to drawing for Quality Comics, beginning in 1952. He worked particularly on the popular title Blackhawk but also on G.I. Combat, Love Confessions, and Love Secrets. When Quality went out of business, Dillin, searching for new work, eventually tried DC Comics where he saw one or more issues of Blackhawk on the desk as he was being interviewed, and to his relief was told, "We've been trying to get in touch with you."

== DC Comics ==
Justice League of America #64 (Aug. 1968), penciller Dillin's first issue. Inking by Joe Giella.

Dillin returned to Blackhawk, now a DC property, and when the book's initial run ended, was assigned Justice League of America, a superteam series featuring, at the time, Superman, Batman, the Flash, Green Lantern, Wonder Woman, Green Arrow, and the Atom. Dillin penciled the series from #64–183 (Aug. 1968–Oct. 1980), except for the planned reprint issues #67, 76, 85 and 93; issue #153 which was pencilled by George Tuska; and issue #157 where he provided the intro and epilogue pages while Juan Ortiz pencilled the main story. He had completed the first 2½ pages of #184 when he died; penciler George Pérez and inker Frank McLaughlin took over the title, starting that issue from scratch.

Dillin's tenure on JLA included the reintroduction of Red Tornado. He and writer Dennis O'Neil made several changes to the membership of the JLA by removing founding members Wonder Woman and the Martian Manhunter. They also oversaw the migration of the Black Canary from Earth-2 to Earth-1; and the introduction of the JLA satellite. Dillin and writer Len Wein produced the return of the Seven Soldiers of Victory in issues #100–102 and the introduction of the Quality Comics characters to the DC continuity as the Freedom Fighters in issues #107–108.

In late 1972, Dillin drew the DC chapter of a metafictional unofficial crossover crafted by writers Wein, Steve Englehart, and Gerry Conway spanning titles from both major comics companies. Each comic featured Englehart, Conway, and Wein, as well as Wein's first wife Glynis, interacting with Marvel or DC characters at the Rutland Halloween Parade in Rutland, Vermont. Beginning in Amazing Adventures #16 (by Englehart with art by Bob Brown and Frank McLaughlin), the story continued in Justice League of America #103 (by Wein, Dillin and Dick Giordano), and concluded in Thor #207 (by Conway and penciler John Buscema).

Wein and Dillin created the supervillain Libra in Justice League of America #111 (June 1974), who would play a leading role in Grant Morrison's Final Crisis storyline in 2008. Dillin drew the return of Wonder Woman to the team in issues #128–129 (March–April 1976). He and writer Steve Englehart crafted a new origin story for the JLA in issue #144 and inducted Hawkgirl into the team two issue later. Other highlights of Dillin's tenure included the 1976 integration of the defunct and newly acquired Fawcett Comics heroes in issues #135–137, and the murder of the original Mister Terrific in issue #171. Dillin and writer Bob Haney created the Super-Sons, Superman Jr. and Batman Jr., in World's Finest Comics #215 (Jan. 1973). He drew several Green Lantern backup stories in The Flash from 1974 to 1977. In 1975, Dillin drew the framing chapters for a 1940s Seven Soldiers of Victory script in Adventure Comics #438 and 443.

He was living in Peekskill, New York, at the time of his death. As per the letters page of Justice League of America #184, Dillin suffered a heart attack.

== Animation ==
Dillin drew animation storyboards for the Trans-Lux/Joe Orolio syndicated TV series Johnny Zero (c. 1962), and The Mighty Hercules (1963), among other shows.

== Bibliography ==
Comics work (interior pencil art) includes:

=== DC Comics ===
- Action Comics (Green Arrow) #424, 426, 431, 434, 436; (The Atom): #425, 427, 430, 433, 435, 438–439, 448; (Private Life of Clark Kent): #477 (1973–1977)
- Adventure Comics (Seven Soldiers of Victory): #438, 443 (1975–1976)
- Atom and Hawkman #40–45 (1968–1969)
- Batman #246 (with Irv Novick); (Robin): #252, 254 (1972–1973)
- Blackhawk #108–241 (1957–1968)
- Challengers of the Unknown #72–73 (1970)
- DC Comics Presents #7, 13–14, 18, 22, 25 (1979–1980)
- DC Special Series (Aquaman): #1 (1977)
- DC Super-Stars #10 (1976)
- Detective Comics (Batman) #433, 483; (Hawkman): #428 (1972–1978)
- The Flash (Kid Flash) #202, 204, 207, 209, 211, 216 (1970–72); (Green Lantern): #227–228, 230–231, 233–234, 245–246 (1974–1977)
- Green Lantern vol. 2 #67, 71 (1969)
- Hawkman #22–27 (1967–1968)
- House of Mystery #197 (1971)
- House of Secrets #82, 84, 87–88, 92, 96 (1969–1972)
- Justice League of America #64–66, 68–75, 77–84, 86–92, 94–152, 154–183 (1968–1980)
- Spectre (Hourman) #7 (1968)
- Superman (Terra-Man): #249; (Fabulous World of Krypton): #257, 263, 266, 268 (1972–1973)
- The Unexpected #121–123, 126, 131, 133, 163, 165 (1970–1975)
- The Witching Hour #26 (1972)
- Wonder Woman #217 (1975)
- World's Finest Comics (Superman team-ups): #198–205, 207–228, 231–233, 235–236, 238, 240, 257; (Green Arrow): #256 (1970–1979)

=== Quality Comics ===
- Blackhawk #37, 40, 64–65, 67–107 (1951–1956)
- Plastic Man #45 (1954)

== Collected editions ==
- Justice League of America Archives
  - Volume 8 collects Justice League of America #64–66, 68–70 ISBN 978-1563899775
  - Volume 9 collects Justice League of America #71–80 ISBN 978-1401204020
  - Volume 10 collects Justice League of America #81–93 ISBN 978-1401234126
- Showcase Presents Justice League of America
  - Volume 4 collects Justice League of America #64–66, 68–75, 77–83 ISBN 978-1401221843
  - Volume 5 collects Justice League of America #84, 86–92, 94–106 ISBN 978-1401230258
  - Volume 6 collects Justice League of America #107–132 ISBN 978-1401238353
- Crisis on Multiple Earths
  - Volume 2 collects Justice League of America #64–65, 73–74, and 82–83 ISBN 978-1401200039
  - Volume 3 collects Justice League of America #91–92, 100–102, 107–108, and 113 ISBN 978-1401202316
  - Volume 4 collects Justice League of America #123–124, 135–137, and 147–148 ISBN 978-1401209575
  - Volume 5 collects Justice League of America #159–160, 171–172, and 183 ISBN 978-1401226237
- Superman/Batman: The Greatest Stories Ever Told includes World’s Finest Comics #207 ISBN 978-1401212278
- Tales of the Batman: Len Wein includes World’s Finest Comics #207 ISBN 978-1401251543

Preceded by Reed Crandall	Blackhawk artist 1951–1968	Succeeded by Pat Boyette
Preceded by Mike Sekowsky	Justice League of America artist 1968–1980	Succeeded by George Pérez
Preceded by Curt Swan	World's Finest Comics artist 1970–1976	Succeeded by Pablo Marcos
