= Elseworlds 80-Page Giant =

1999 collection by DC Comics

- Cover to Elseworlds 80-Page Giant; art by Ty Templeton, featuring the Super-Sons

Publication information
- Publisher: DC Comics
- Format: One-shot
- Genre: see below
- Publication date: August 1999
- No. of issues: 1

Creative team
- Written by: Chuck Dixon; Mark Waid; Tom Peyer; Kyle Baker; Bob Haney; Dan Curtis Johnson; Bronwyn Carlton
- Artist(s): Various, inc. Ty Templeton, Kyle Baker, Kieron Dwyer and Aaron Lopresti, et al.
- Editor: Dan Raspler with Tony Bedard

Elseworlds 80-Page Giant is an 80-page collection of Elseworlds stories published by DC Comics. The collection was withdrawn and pulped after DC became concerned about a scene in one of the stories.

== Publication history ==
This comic included the stories "Superman Jr. Is No More!", featuring the Super-Sons, and "Letitia Lerner, Superman's Babysitter", among others. DC Comics President Paul Levitz deemed the Letitia Lerner story inappropriate (for featuring scenes depicting the baby Superman in a microwave, among others) and ordered the press run halted and the printed issues destroyed. Despite this, around 2,000 copies of the issue had already been shipped to the UK. Although DC attempted to recall these copies, they quickly became a highly sought after collector's item, and estimates of available copies range between 700 and 2,000.

The Letitia Lerner story earned two Eisner Awards, and was later republished in the pages of Bizarro Comics (a collection originally devised as a vehicle to showcase the feature).

The Super-Sons story was republished in Batman/Superman: Saga of the Super Sons.

== Contents ==
The following stories were included:

- The Reaching Hand: A Lovecraftian gothic horror tale about detective Bruce Wayne's investigation into the murder of Elongated Man and other stretching characters. By Dan Curtis Johnson and Aaron Lopresti.
- Rockumentary: Reporter Bonnie Firestein gives the behind-the-scenes history of the most famous music producer of all time, Lex Luthor. By Bronwyn Carlton, Greg Luzniak, and Anibal Rodriguez.
- Letitia Lerner, Superman's Babysitter: Ma and Pa Kent decide to finally risk a night out, leaving their super-powered baby with a baby-sitter who is unaware of how difficult he is to control. By Kyle Baker and Elizabeth Glass.
- The Vigilantes of Apartment 3-B: A daily comic strip version of the Birds of Prey, based on Apartment 3-G. Sexy roommates Dinah Drake and Barbara Gordon are Black Canary and Batgirl, and when they are not dealing with crime they are dealing with their love lives. By Chuck Dixon and Enrique Villagran.
- Superman Jr. Is No More!: The Super-Sons, Batman Jr. and Superman Jr., return in a tale that puts their friendship, and their lives, on the line. By Bob Haney and Kieron Dwyer.
- Scandalgate: President Superman is in crisis. The story is a satire of Bill Clinton's impeachment with Superman's enemies interrogating press secretary Jimmy Olsen. By Tom Peyer and Ty Templeton.
- Worlds Apart: Baby Kal-El's rocketship accidentally crashes into the Wayne family, causing young Bruce to declare a never-ending war against "that damn baby". By Chuck Dixon, Trevor Von Eeden, and Josef Rubinstein.
- Silver Age Elseworlds: A series of gag covers for Elseworlds tales, done in the style of the Silver Age, created by Mark Waid and Ty Templeton, including:
  - Superman in President Abraham (Brainiac) Lincoln vs. Clark Kent, Metallo: Kal-El is found by the Booth family and tries to kill the president.
  - Luthor's Daughter, Wonder Woman: Lex Luthor goes back in time and becomes Wonder Woman's father.
  - Batman with Robin, the Squid Wonder: Batman fights crime under the sea.
  - The Golden Age Teen Titans in Zoot Suit Riot!: Dr. Fate Jr., Kid Spectre, Li'l Atom, the Amazon Prince, the Golden Age Arsenal, and Stripesy go up against Zoot Alores, the haberdasher of hate.
  - Legion of Super-Heroes in The Revenge of Young Darkseid: Young Darkseid is rejected by the Legion of Super-Heroes.
  - Menace of the Gorilla-Explorer: Christopher Grodd Columbus of Gorilla City discovers America.
  - Liberté, Egalité, Metallica: The Metal Men fight for the people during the French Revolution.
  - Batman with Eve in The Garden of Evil: Batman protects Eve from a Joker-faced serpent in the Garden of Eden. Eve begins to notice that Adam is never around when Batman appears.
- Dark Night of the Golden Kingdom: A parody of the famous Elseworlds tale Kingdom Come, Batman is dead and Superman left the Earth twenty years ago, partially because he is tired and he cannot stand the beeping of Jimmy Olsen's watch. It is now up to Aquahawk, Martian Manhuntress, Negative Woman, and Green Canary to fight against the composite Joker-Luthor. By Tom Peyer and Ariel Olivetti.

== 2012 reissue ==
The entire issue was reprinted as DC Comics Presents: Elseworlds 100-Page Spectacular #1 (indicia title: DC Comics Presents: Elseworlds 80-Page Giant #1) with a cover date of January 2012 and a cover price of $7.99 US. It went on sale December 28, 2011. This reissue included one story not included in the original 1999 edition: The Berlin Batman by Paul Pope (story and art), a tale of a Jewish Batman in 1939 Berlin. This story originally appeared in The Batman Chronicles #11, winter 1998.

== See also ==
- List of Elseworlds publications
- Recalled comics
