= Letitia Lerner, Superman's Babysitter =

Comic book by Kyle Baker and Liz Glass

- Panel from "Letitia Lerner, Superman's Babysitter"
- Publisher: DC Comics
- Publication date: June 1999
- Genre: Humor/comedy, superhero

Creative team
- Writer(s): Kyle Baker; Liz Glass
- Artist: Kyle Baker
- Colorist: Kyle Baker
- Bizarro Comics: ISBN 1-56389-779-2

"Letitia Lerner, Superman's Babysitter" is a comic book story by Kyle Baker, co-written with Liz Glass.

== Publication history ==
The story originally appeared in DC Comics' parallel universe anthology Elseworlds 80-Page Giant #1 (June 1999). Baker drew, colored, lettered and, with Elizabeth Glass, wrote the 10-page story. In the story, the super-toddler climbs into a microwave oven. As a result, most copies were recalled and pulped. DC destroyed all copies of the issue intended for the North American market, though copies were still distributed in Europe.

== Collected editions ==
In May 2001, the story was reprinted in the Bizarro Comics hardcover (ISBN 1-56389-779-2). A softcover edition of Bizarro Comics (ISBN 1-56389-958-2) followed in April 2003.

== Awards ==
The story won Eisner Award in 2000 for Best Short Story.

Also that year, Baker won the Eisner Award for Best Writer/Artist: Humor based on both "Letitia Lerner, Superman's Babysitter" and the DC Comics/Vertigo graphic novel I Die at Midnight.
