= Bob Haney =

American comic book writer (1926–2004)

- Haney in 2003, reading a Teen Titans Archive Edition
- Born: Robert Gilbert Haney, Jr. March 15, 1926 Philadelphia, Pennsylvania, U.S.
- Died: November 25, 2004 (aged 78) La Mesa, California, U.S.
- Area: Writer
- Notable works: Aquaman; Blackhawk; The Brave and the Bold; Metamorpho; Teen Titans; Unknown Soldier
- Awards: Alley Award; Inkpot Award; Bill Finger Award

Robert Gilbert Haney, Jr. (March 15, 1926 – November 25, 2004) was an American comic book writer, best known for his work for DC Comics. He co-created the Teen Titans as well as characters such as Lance Bruner, Black Manta, Metamorpho, Eclipso, Cain, and the Super-Sons.

== Biography ==
=== Early life and career ===
Haney grew up in Philadelphia, where he read popular newspaper comic strips such as Prince Valiant and Flash Gordon, and was a regular listener of radio dramas. Haney attended Swarthmore College. During World War II, he served in the Navy and saw action during the Battle of Okinawa. After the war, he earned a Master's degree from Columbia University and then embarked on a writing career, publishing a number of novels under a variety of assumed names.

In 1948, Haney entered the comic book industry. His first published comics story was "College for Murder" in Black Cat #9 (January 1948). From 1948 to 1955 Haney wrote crime and war comics for a number of publishers, including Fawcett, Standard, Hillman, Harvey, and St. John.

=== DC Comics ===
In large part due to the anti-comic book campaign launched by Fredric Wertham's Seduction of the Innocent and the United States Senate Subcommittee on Juvenile Delinquency in 1953, most of Haney's publishers went out of business in the 1950s. In 1955 he connected with DC Comics and his first DC credit was the story "Frogman's Secret!" in All-American Men of War #17 (January 1955). Thus began a long association with DC, which lasted almost thirty years, with Haney scripting just about every sort of comic DC published.

Haney was the writer of the story "The Rock of Easy Co.!" in Our Army at War #81 (April 1959), the first appearance of Sgt. Rock. Haney and artist Lee Elias created the supervillain Eclipso in House of Secrets #61 (August 1963).

Haney frequently claimed to have co-created the Doom Patrol with Arnold Drake and worked with him on the first few issues, but Drake insisted that Haney worked on the first issue only, and that his only role in creating Doom Patrol was co-creating the character Negative Man.

In 1964, Haney created the Teen Titans with artists Bruno Premiani and Nick Cardy. Robin, Kid Flash, and Aqualad teamed up in The Brave and the Bold #54 (July 1964) to defeat a weather-controlling villain known as Mister Twister. They subsequently appeared under the name "Teen Titans" in The Brave and the Bold #60 in July 1965, joined by Wonder Woman's younger sister Wonder Girl in her first appearance. After next being featured in Showcase #59 (Dec. 1965), the team was spun off into their own series with Teen Titans #1 (February 1966).

The Metamorpho character was created by Haney and artist Ramona Fradon in The Brave and the Bold #57 (January 1965). Haney stated in 1995 that "The most creative single thing I ever did was Metamorpho". The character was featured in his own title, also written by Haney, from 1965 to 1968. Metamorpho later appeared in a series of back-up stories in Action Comics #413–418 and World's Finest Comics #218–220 and #229.

Haney and artist Howard Purcell created the supernatural character the Enchantress in Strange Adventures #187 (April 1966). The Enchantress appears in the 2016 live-action movie Suicide Squad, portrayed by actress Cara Delevingne.

Haney was the writer of many of the issues of The Brave and the Bold including #59 (April–May 1965) which featured Batman's first team-up in the title. Haney scripted issue #85 (Aug.-Sept 1969) wherein artist Neal Adams updated Green Arrow's visual appearance by designing a new costume for the character. Haney frequently disregarded continuity by scripting stories which contradicted DC's canon or by writing major heroes in an out-of-character fashion. Haney himself, along with artist Jim Aparo, appeared as a character in The Brave and the Bold #124 (January 1976). Haney's final story of the series was a Batman and Kamandi team-up in issue #157 (Dec. 1979).

Among his contributions to the Aquaman mythos are the characters Tula introduced in Aquaman #33 (May–June 1967) and Nuidis Vulko in The Brave and the Bold #73 (Aug.–Sept. 1967). He also co-created Black Manta who first appeared in Aquaman #35 (September 1967).

The Super-Sons, Superman Jr. and Batman Jr., were co-created by Haney and Dick Dillin in World's Finest Comics #215 (January 1973). Haney introduced Batman's older brother, Thomas Wayne Jr., in World's Finest Comics #223 (May–June 1974). This story was used a basis for a plot detail in the "Court of Owls" story arc in 2012. The House of Mystery's host Cain, a character modeled on writer Len Wein, was created by Haney with artist Jack Sparling and editor Joe Orlando.

His later war comics work included the four-page "Dirty Job," illustrated by Alex Toth, for Our Army at War #241 (February 1972), which has been described as Haney's "true masterpiece". He wrote the "Unknown Soldier" feature in Star Spangled War Stories in 1971 and 1972. He returned in 1977 and oversaw the series being renamed after the character. He wrote the retitled series until its cancellation with #268 (October 1982).

Haney's stories in the 1960s and 1970s, especially with the Teen Titans and the Super-Sons, often dealt with youth culture and current issues, but by the late 1970s and early 1980s, Haney struggled to produce material that DC's editors considered timely or contemporary. This led to clashes with the DC editorial staff and ultimately to his departure from the comics industry.

=== Animation ===
In the 1960s Haney contributed scripts to The New Adventures of Superman and The Superman/Aquaman Hour of Adventure cartoon shows; and in the 1980s, after leaving DC, wrote for several Rankin/Bass animated shows, including ThunderCats, Silverhawks and Karate Kat.

=== Later life ===
When comics and animation work petered out in the late 1980s, Haney turned to other forms of writing, including a book on carpentry. He wrote a few additional comics scripts for DC including Elseworlds 80-Page Giant #1 (August 1999); Silver Age: The Brave and the Bold #1 (July 2000); and the posthumously published Teen Titans Lost Annual #1 (March 2008). His last few years were spent in San Felipe, Baja California, Mexico. Haney died at age 78 on November 25, 2004, in La Mesa, California. He is interred at Fort Rosecrans National Cemetery, San Diego, California.

== Awards ==
Haney's industry recognitions included the 1968 Alley Award for Best Full-Length Story ("Track of the Hook" in The Brave and the Bold #79, drawn by Neal Adams) and a 1997 Inkpot Award at San Diego Comic-Con. He was awarded the Bill Finger Award posthumously in 2011.

== Family ==
Haney's brother-in-law was Ned Chase, the father of actor Chevy Chase.

== Bibliography ==
=== DC Comics ===
- 1st Issue Special #3 (1975)
- Action Comics #413–418 (1972)
- Adventure Comics #228 (1956)
- Adventures of Rex, the Wonder Dog #28–29, 31, 34, 36 (1956–1957)
- All American Men of War #42–43, 45, 47–56, 58–60, 62–75, 77–86, 88–93 (1957–1962)
- All Star Western #99 (1958)
- All-American Men of War #17, 26–28, 30–32, 34–36, 38–40, 94–95 (1955–1963)
- All-Out War #3 (1980)
- Aquaman #25–39 (1966–1968)
- Blackhawk #204–205, 207–209, 216–217, 228–243 (1965–1968)
- The Brave and the Bold #4, 6–15, 17–24, 50–51, 53–60, 63–86, 88–92, 94–146, 148–152, 154–155, 157 (1956–1979)
- DC Special #23 (1976)
- DC Special Series #7–8 (1977–1978)
- Detective Comics #492 (1980)
- Elseworlds 80-Page Giant (1999)
- G.I. Combat #45–49, 51–52, 54–56, 58–88, 91–93, 95, 97–102, 139, 142, 152, 174, 177, 217, 220, 225, 231, 260 (1957–1983)
- Ghosts #91, 105 (1980–1981)
- Hawkman #22–23, 25 (1967–1968)
- Hopalong Cassidy #112 (1956)
- House of Secrets #23, 61–80 (1959–1966)
- Metamorpho #1–17 (1966–1968)
- My Greatest Adventure #73, 80–81 (1962–1963)
- Our Army at War #40, 42, 44–48, 50–55, 58–63, 65–66, 68, 70–74, 76–110, 112–115, 118–120, 122–123, 125, 129–131, 200, 237, 240–241, 250 (1955–1972)
- Our Fighting Forces #7–22, 24–31, 33–36, 39–61, 63, 67–72, 77–78, 82 (1955–1964)
- Robin Hood Tales #7–11, 14 (1957–1958)
- Sea Devils #1–4, 22–26, 28–29 (1961–1966)
- Secrets of Haunted House #35 (1981)
- Showcase #48–49, 52, 59, 66–67 (1964–1967)
- Silver Age: The Brave and the Bold (2000)
- Star Spangled War Stories #38, 40, 42–43, 46–48, 50, 53–62, 64–73, 75–99, 102, 104, 107–109, 111, 114, 155–156, 158–161, 163–166, 204 (1955–1977)
- Strange Adventures #167, 187, 191, 200 (1964–1967)
- Superboy #180 (1971)
- Superman #226, 228 (1970)
- Superman's Pal Jimmy Olsen #130, 132 (1970)
- Tales of the Unexpected #91, 93–94 (1965–1966)
- Teen Titans #1–17, 23–24, 32–43 (1966–1973)
- Time Warp #4 (1980)
- Tomahawk #139 (1972)
- Unknown Soldier #251–253, 259–268 (1981–1982)
- Weird War Tales #78, 90–91 (1979–1980)
- Western Comics #55–56 (1956)
- Witching Hour #18, 38 (1971–1974)
- World's Finest Comics #103, 122, 192–196, 215–249, 251–255, 263–267, 269–270, 272–273 (1959–1981)

=== Pacific Comics ===
- Pacific Presents #4 (1984)

Preceded by Robert Kanigher	All-American Men of War writer 1955–1963	Succeeded by Robert Kanigher
Preceded by France Herron	The Brave and the Bold writer 1956–1979	Succeeded by Gerry Conway
Preceded by Jack Miller	Aquaman writer 1966–1968	Succeeded by Steve Skeates
Preceded by n/a	Teen Titans writer 1966–1970	Succeeded by Robert Kanigher
Preceded by Steve Skeates	Teen Titans writer 1971–1973	Succeeded by Bob Rozakis
Preceded by Steve Skeates and Dennis O'Neil	World's Finest Comics writer 1972–1979	Succeeded by Dennis O'Neil
