= World's Finest Comics =

Comic book series by DC Comics

- Cover of World's Best Comics #1 (spring 1941).

Publication information
- Publisher: DC Comics
- Schedule: Quarterly #1–20; Bimonthly #21–95 and #244–269; Monthly #96–243 and #270–323
- Format: Ongoing series
- Genre: Superhero
- Publication date: Spring 1941 – January 1986
- No. of issues: 323
- Main character(s): Superman; Batman; Robin

Creative team
- Written by: List: Mike W. Barr, Joey Cavalieri, Gerry Conway, Leo Dorfman, Mike Friedrich, Bob Haney, David Anthony Kraft, Elliot S. Maggin, Dennis O'Neil, Alvin Schwartz, Steve Skeates, Roy Thomas, Len Wein, Marv Wolfman
- Penciller: List: Neal Adams, Sal Amendola, Ross Andru, Rich Buckler, José Delbo, Dick Dillin, George Pérez, Curt Swan, Mark Texeira, George Tuska, Stan Woch
- Inker: List: Alfredo Alcala, Murphy Anderson, Vince Colletta, Joe Giella, Stan Kaye, Frank McLaughlin

Collected editions
- World's Finest Archives Volume 1: ISBN 1-56389-488-2
- World's Finest Archives Volume 2: ISBN 1-56389-743-1
- World's Finest Archives Volume 3: ISBN 1-4012-0411-2

World's Finest Comics is an American comic book series published by DC Comics from 1941 to 1986. The series was initially titled World's Best Comics for its first issue; issue #2 (Summer 1941) switched to the more familiar name. Michael E. Uslan has speculated that this was because DC received a cease and desist letter from Better Publications, Inc., who had been publishing a comic book entitled Best Comics since November 1939. Virtually every issue featured DC's two leading superheroes, Superman and Batman, with the earliest issues also featuring Batman's sidekick, Robin.

== Publication history ==
The idea for World's Best Comics #1 originated from the identically formatted 1940 New York World's Fair Comics featuring Superman, Batman, and Robin with 96 pages and a cardboard cover. The year before there was a similar 1939 New York World's Fair Comics featuring Superman but without Batman and Robin because Bob Kane and Bill Finger had not yet created them.

The series was initially a 96-page quarterly anthology, featuring various DC characters – always including Superman and Batman – in separate stories. Comics historian Les Daniels noted that "pairing Superman and Batman made sense financially, since the two were DC's most popular heroes". When superheroes fell out of vogue in the early 1950s, DC shortened the size of the publication to that of the rest of its output, leaving only enough space for one story; this led to Superman and Batman appearing in the same story together starting with World's Finest Comics #71 (July 1954). The title often depicted Batman gaining superpowers as a way to avoid having him be overshadowed by Superman. Lex Luthor and the Joker first joined forces in issue #88 (June 1957). A new supervillain, the Composite Superman, was introduced in #142 (June 1964). The story "The Clash of Cape and Cowl", by writer Edmond Hamilton and artist Curt Swan, in World's Finest Comics #153 (Nov. 1965) is the source of an Internet meme in which Batman slaps Robin. Noted Batman artist Neal Adams first drew the character in an interior story in "The Superman-Batman Revenge Squads" in issue #175 (May 1968).

The title briefly featured Superman teaming with heroes other than Batman in the early 1970s beginning with issue #198 (November 1970). That issue featured the first part of a two-issue team-up with the Flash. Other characters to appear in the next two years included Robin, Green Lantern, Aquaman, Wonder Woman, the Teen Titans, Doctor Fate, Hawkman, Green Arrow, the Martian Manhunter, the Atom, and the Vigilante. Nick Cardy was the cover artist for World's Finest Comics for issues #212–228. Metamorpho was the backup feature in issues #218–220 and #229 after the character had a brief run as the backup in Action Comics.

The series reverted to Superman and Batman team-ups after issue #214, initially with a unique twist, featuring the children they might one day have: Superman Jr. and Batman Jr. These characters, billed as the Super-Sons, were co-created by writer Bob Haney and artist Dick Dillin in issue #215 (January 1973). Super-Sons stories alternated with tales of the original Superman and Batman through issue #263, with issues #215–216, 221–222, 224, 228, 230, 231, 233, 238, 242, and 263 featuring the sons. Haney frequently disregarded continuity by scripting stories which contradicted DC's canon or by writing major heroes in an out-of-character fashion. He introduced Batman's older brother, Thomas Wayne Jr., in World's Finest Comics #223 (May–June 1974). This story was used as a basis for a plot detail in the "Court of Owls" story arc in 2012. Issues #223 (May–June 1974) to #228 (March–April 1975) of the series were in the 100 Page Super Spectacular format.

With issue #244 (April–May 1977), World's Finest Comics became one of the first 80-page Dollar Comics. It featured the Superman and Batman team with back-up features. The number of pages was reduced from 80 to 64 starting with issue #253 (October–November 1978) and reduced to 48 pages with issue #266 (December 1980 – January 1981) which lasted until issue #282 (August 1982).

First feature	Second feature	Third feature	Fourth feature
the Green Arrow #244–259, 261–270, 272–284	the Vigilante #244–248	Wonder Woman of Earth-Two #244–250	the Black Canary #244–256
the Atom #260	the Creeper #249–255	Wonder Woman #251–252	Black Lightning #257–261
	Hawkman #256–259, 261–262, 264–270, 272–277, 279–282	Shazam! #253–270, 272–282	Aquaman #262–264
	Adam Strange #263		the Red Tornado #265–270, 272
			Plastic Man #273
Zatanna #274–278
no fourth backup feature #260, 279–282

Issue #250 (April–May 1978) combined Superman and Batman with the Green Arrow, the Black Canary, and Wonder Woman into the World's Finest Team in a 56-page story. Writer Roy Thomas wrote a book-length story for issue #271 (September 1981) which pieced together all the "first meetings" of Superman and Batman. This issue did not have any backup features. The Hawkman story "Drive Me to the Moon!" in #272 (October 1981) featured Hawkgirl changing her title to Hawkwoman. As of issue #283 (September 1982), the series reverted to a standard format title again featuring only Superman and Batman team-ups, which continued until the series' cancellation with issue #323 (January 1986). The series reached issue #300 in February 1984. This double-sized anniversary issue was a "jam" featuring a story by writers David Anthony Kraft, Mike W. Barr, and Marv Wolfman with art by Ross Andru, Mark Texeira, Sal Amendola, and George Pérez. David Mazzucchelli, the artist of the "Batman: Year One" story arc in 1987, first drew Batman in a backup story in World's Finest Comics #302 (April 1984). Issue #314 (April 1985) was the last Pre-Crisis issue and the first Crisis on Infinite Earths appearances of the Monitor and (Lyla) the Harbinger. The series ended with issue #323 (January 1986) by writer Joey Cavalieri and artist José Delbo.

== Titles ==
A number of World's Finest titles have since appeared:

- A three-issue miniseries in 1990 by Dave Gibbons, Steve Rude and Karl Kesel. In the series, Superman and Batman battle their archenemies Lex Luthor and the Joker, and for that, they temporarily exchange their places in their home cities. Superman goes to Gotham City, and Batman goes to Metropolis.
- A three-issue Legends of the World's Finest miniseries in 1994 by Walt Simonson and Dan Brereton.
- A two-issue Superboy/Robin: World's Finest Three miniseries in 1996.
- Elseworld's Finest – a two-issue miniseries that reimagines Superman and Batman in a 1920s style pulp adventure.
- World's Finest: Parts I-III (also known as The Batman/Superman Movie) and Batman/Superman Adventures: World's Finest, a 1997 three-part episode of Superman: The Animated Series and its comics adaptation, respectively.
- Elseworld's Finest: Supergirl & Batgirl, a one-shot in 1998.
- Superman and Batman: World's Funnest, featuring Mr. Mxyzptlk and Bat-Mite.
- A 10-issue miniseries in 1999 written by Karl Kesel and illustrated by Dave Taylor. This series explored the Post-Crisis history of the two with each of the 10 issues taking place one year after the other.
- William Morrow and Company released a World's Finest novel in 2009, titled Enemies and Allies by novelist Kevin J. Anderson. The story is about the first meeting between the Dark Knight and the Man of Steel during the Cold War.
- A four-issue World's Finest miniseries written by Sterling Gates was published in late 2009 and early 2010. In the series, Superman has relocated to New Krypton and Batman (Bruce Wayne) is presumed dead. Thus, it falls to various members of the Superman and Batman families to battle Toyboy, Mr. Freeze, the Penguin and the Kryptonite Man. Protagonists include Superman Family members Nightwing (Chris Kent), the Guardian and Supergirl, along with Batman Family members the Red Robin (Tim Drake), Robin (Damian Wayne), the Oracle and Batgirl (Stephanie Brown). Superman and Batman (Dick Grayson) appear in the final issue.
- While not released under the name World's Finest, the series Superman/Batman fulfilled much the same function as its predecessor. It was published from 2003 to 2011.
- A new monthly team-up series titled Batman/Superman was launched in 2013.
- A new ongoing series with a similar name but a differently-placed apostrophe, Worlds' Finest, began in May 2012. It starred Power Girl and the Huntress. In this incarnation, the two are natives of Earth-2, where they used the codenames Supergirl and Robin, respectively. With issue #29 the series began to feature the Superman and Batman of Earth 2 as the main characters.
- Batwoman: World's Finest – in October 2012, the Batwoman title's third storyline featured Batwoman fighting alongside Wonder Woman in a five-issue story arc.
- Batgirl: World's Finest - in March 2017, the first Annual of Batgirl (vol. 5) saw Batgirl team with Supergirl for a special mission.
- Batman/Superman: World's Finest – an ongoing series released in March 2022, with Mark Waid writing and Dan Mora serving as illustrator.

== Collected editions ==
Title	Volume	Material collected	Publication date	ISBN
World's Finest Archives	1	World's Finest Comics #71–85 and Superman #76	March 1999	978-1563894886
World's Finest Archives	2	World's Finest Comics #86–101	January 2002	978-1563897436
World's Finest Archives	3	World's Finest Comics #102–116	September 2005	978-1-4012-0411-2
Batman: The World's Finest Comics Archives	1	Batman stories from World's Finest Comics #1–16 and New York World's Fair Comics #2	October 2002	978-1563898198
Batman: The World's Finest Comics Archives	2	Batman stories from World's Finest Comics #17–32	January 2005	978-1-4012-0163-0
Superman: The World's Finest Comics Archives	1	Superman stories from World's Finest Comics #1–16 and New York World's Fair Comics #1–2	September 2004	978-1-4012-0151-7
Superman: The World's Finest Comics Archives	2	Superman stories from World's Finest Comics #17–32	November 2009	978-1-4012-2470-7
Showcase Presents World's Finest	1	World's Finest Comics #71–111 and Superman #76	October 2007	978-1-4012-1697-9
Showcase Presents World's Finest	2	World's Finest Comics #112–145	October 2008	978-1-4012-1981-9
Showcase Presents World's Finest	3	World's Finest Comics #146–160, #162–169, #171–173	March 2010	978-1-4012-2585-8
Showcase Presents World's Finest	4	World's Finest Comics #174–178, #180–187, #189–196, #198–202	November 2012	978-1-4012-3736-3
Batman in the Fifties	1	Batman #59, 62–63, 81, 92, 105, 113–114, 121–122, 128; Detective Comics #156, 168, 185, 187, 215–216, 233, 235–236, 241, 244, 252, 257, 269; World’s Finest Comics #81, 89	September 2021	978-1779509505
Superman/Batman: The Greatest Stories Ever Told	1	Superman #76, World’s Finest Comics #88, 142, 159, 176, 207; The Man of Steel #3, Batman & Superman: World’s Finest #7; Superman/Batman Secret Files 2003, Annual 1	March 2007	978-1-4012-1227-8
The Greatest Batman Stories Ever Told	1	Detective Comics #31-32, 211, 235, 345, 404, 429, 437, 442, 457, 474, 482, 500; Batman #1, 25, 47, 61, 156, 234, 250, 312; 1001 Umbrellas of the Penguin, Star-Spangled Comics #124, World’s Finest Comics #94, DC Special Series #15, The Brave and the Bold #197	1988	0930289-39-0
Showcase Presents Green Arrow	1	Green Arrow stories from World's Finest Comics #95–140	January 2006	978-1-4012-0785-4
Showcase Presents Aquaman	2	Aquaman stories from World's Finest Comics #130–133, 135, 137 and 139	January 2008	978-1-4012-1712-9
Superman: The Bottle City of Kandor	1	Action Comics #242, 245; Superman’s Girl Friend, Lois Lane #21, 76, 78; Superman’s Pal Jimmy Olsen #53, 69; Superman #158, 338; The Superman Family #194, World’s Finest Comics #143	October 2007	978-1-4012-1465-4
DC's Greatest Imaginary Stories	1	Captain Marvel Adventures #66, Batman #127, 151; Superman’s Girl Friend, Lois Lane #19, 51; Superman #149, 166; Superman’s Pal Jimmy Olsen #57, The Flash #128, World’s Finest Comics #172	September 2005	978-1-4012-0534-8
DC's Greatest Imaginary Stories	2	Batman #122, 131, 135, 145, 154, 159, 163, 300; World's Finest Comics #153, Superman's Girl Friend, Lois Lane #89	June 2010	978-1-4012-2725-8
Superman vs. the Flash	1	Superman #199, The Flash #175, World's Finest Comics #198–199, and DC Comics Presents #1–2	May 2005	978-1-4012-0456-3
World's Finest: Guardians of Earth	1	Superman team-up stories from World's Finest Comics #198-214	March 2020	978-1-77950-178-3
Tales of the Batman: Len Wein	1	Detective Comics #408, 444–448, 466, 478–479, 500, 514; Batman #307-310, 312–319, 321–324, 326–327; World's Finest Comics #207, The Untold Legend of the Batman #1-3, DC Retroactive: Batman - The '70s, Batman Black and White (vol. 2) #5	December 2014	978-1-4012-5154-3
Superman/Batman: Saga of the Super Sons	1	Super Sons stories from World's Finest Comics #215–216, 221–222, 224, 228, 230–231, 233, 238, 242, 263, and Elseworlds 80-Page Giant #1	December 2007	978-1-4012-1502-6
Deadman Omnibus	1	Strange Adventures #205-216, The Brave and the Bold #79, 86, 104, 133; Aquaman #50-52, Challengers of the Unknown #74, 84–87; Justice League of America #94, World's Finest Comics #223, 227; The Phantom Stranger #33, 39–41; The Superman Family #183, DC Super Stars #18, DC Special Series #8, Adventure Comics #460-466, DC Comics Presents #24, Detective Comics #500, covers from Deadman #1-7, Deadman (vol. 2) #1-4, Secret Origins (vol. 2) #15	December 2020	978-1-77950-488-3
Legends of the Dark Knight: José Luis García-López	1	Batman #272, 311, 313–314, 318, 321, 336–337, 353; Batman '66: The Lost Episode #1, Batman Confidential #26-28, Batman Family #3, Batman: Gotham Knights #10, DC Comics Presents #31, 41; DC Special Series #21, Detective Comics #454, 458–459, 483, 487; The Best of the Brave and the Bold #1-6, The Brave and the Bold #164, 171; The Joker #4, The Untold Legend of the Batman #1-3, World's Finest Comics #244, 255, 258	November 2021	978-1-77950-580-4
The Creeper by Steve Ditko	1	Creeper stories from World's Finest Comics #249–255	April 2010	978-1-4012-2591-9
Tales of the Batman: Gerry Conway	1	Man-Bat #1, Detective Comics #463-464, 497–499, 501–504; Batman #295, 305–306; Batman Family #17, World's Finest Comics #250, 269	July 2017	978-1-4012-7255-5
Tales of the Batman: Gerry Conway	2	Detective Comics #505-513, Batman #337-346, 348; World's Finest Comics #270	August 2018	978-1-4012-8163-2
Batman Arkham: Poison Ivy	1	Batman #181, 339; Batman: Legends of the Dark Knight #42-43, Batman: Poison Ivy, Batman: Shadow of the Bat Annual #3, Detective Comics #23.1, Gotham City Sirens #8, Joker's Asylum: Poison Ivy #1, Secret Origins (vol. 2) #36, The Batman Chronicles #10, back-up story from World's Finest Comics #251-252	September 2016	978-1-4012-6445-1
Shazam: The World's Mightiest Mortal	3	Captain Marvel stories from World's Finest Comics #253-270, 272-282 and Adventure Comics #491-492	May 2021	978-1779509468
Tales of the Batman: Marv Wolfman	1	Batman #328-335, 436–439; Detective Comics #408, The Brave and the Bold #167, The New Teen Titans #37, Batman and the Outsiders #5, World's Finest Comics #288	March 2020	978-1-4012-9961-3
Batman and Superman in World's Finest: The Silver Age Omnibus	1	World's Finest Comics #71–116 and Superman #76	March 2016	978-1-4012-6112-2
Batman and Superman in World's Finest: The Silver Age Omnibus	2	World's Finest Comics #117–158	April 2019	978-1-4012-8905-8
Green Arrow Golden Age Omnibus	1	World's Finest Comics #7–28; More Fun Comics #73–107 and Adventure Comics #103–117	January 2018	978-1-4012-7720-8
Superman/Batman: Saga of the Super Sons	1	World's Finest Comics #215-216, 221–222, 224, 228, 230, 231, 233, 238, 242, 263; Elseworlds 80-page Giant #1	5 December 2007	
Superman/Batman: Saga of the Super Sons	1	World's Finest Comics #215-216, 221–222, 224, 228, 230, 231, 233, 238, 242, 263; Elseworlds 80-page Giant #1	25 January 2017 (new edition)	1-4012-6968-0/978-1-4012-6968-5

== In other media ==
- "World's Finest" is the name of a 1997 three-part episode of Superman: The Animated Series which involves Superman and Batman working together to fight Lex Luthor and the Joker. In 2002, the three parts of the episode were combined and released as a direct-to-video film titled The Batman Superman Movie.
- In the 2009 direct-to-video animated film Superman/Batman: Public Enemies (an adaptation of "The World's Finest", the opening story arc of Superman/Batman), the Man of Steel and the Dark Knight team up to prevent a meteoroid from striking Earth and to take down Lex Luthor, who has been elected President of the United States and has framed Superman for murder. DCAU cast members Kevin Conroy, Tim Daly, Clancy Brown and CCH Pounder reprised their respective roles as Batman, Superman, Luthor and Amanda Waller. Additionally, Allison Mack voiced the role of Power Girl.
- In 2010, a sequel was released titled Superman/Batman: Apocalypse which is an adaptation of Jeph Loeb and Michael Turner's second story arc, "The Supergirl from Krypton". DCAU cast members Kevin Conroy, Tim Daly, Susan Eisenberg, and Ed Asner reprised their respective roles as Batman, Superman, Wonder Woman and Granny Goodness. Additionally, Summer Glau voiced Supergirl and Andre Braugher voiced Darkseid.
- The eighteenth episode of the first season of Supergirl is titled "Worlds Finest". The episode is a crossover with The Flash and features a team-up of the title characters of both series. Kara Danvers gains a new ally when the Flash suddenly appears from an alternate universe and helps Kara battle Silver Banshee and Livewire in exchange for her help in finding a way to return him home.

== See also ==
- Superman/Batman
- Superman & Batman: Generations
