= Józseffalva, Hungary =

Józseffalva Josephdorf (German)
- Former municipality
- Location within Hungary
- Country: Hungary
- Regions: Northern Hungary
- County: Borsod-Abaúj-Zemplén County
- District: Sárospatak District
- Foundation: 1785
- Time zone: UTC+1 (CET)
  - Summer (DST): UTC+2 (CEST)
- Postal code: 3950
- Area code: (+36) 47
- Website: www.jozseffalva.hu

Józseffalva (German: Josephdorf) or Újpatak was a village in Borsod-Abaúj-Zemplén County, northern Hungary. Now it is part of the town of Sárospatak.

== Geography ==
The settlement was located south of the historic center of Sárospatak, between the town and Bodroghalász, on the right bank of the Bodrog. The old main street of Józseffalva is now called Szent József Street.

== History ==
Around 1750, John Leopold Trautson settled Swabians in two newly established villages in Zemplén (Hercegkút and Károlyfalva). During the reign of Joseph II, a third Swabian settlement, Józseffalva was established on the outskirts of Sárospatak in 1785. Based on the surviving records, the village was likely founded by 32 serf families. Most of them were young married couples with few children or none at all. Only a few settlers were over the age of 30.

The village's Catholic kindergarten opened on September 6, 1846. Already in its first school year, more than 150 children attended the kindergarten. The kindergarten operated in the village for six years until it moved to Sárospatak in October 1852. However, the village never had its own school; from the very beginning, the local schoolchildren attended the Catholic school in Sárospatak. This clearly played a role in the Magyarization of the population: although the first Hungarian wife moved to the originally purely German village in 1789, the language shift among the residents of Józseffalva was complete in less than a century. By 1900, there was not a single local resident left who was not recorded as a native Hungarian speaker.

The village was merged with Sárospatak on March 16, 1911.

== Name ==
The settlement was named Újpatak because of its location, as it was separated from Sárospatak by only one street. The name Józseffalva preserves the name of Emperor Joseph II, who settled the Swabian population here. However, over time, the name of Saint Joseph became the namesake in the tradition of the Catholic Swabians.
