= Alex Toth =

American cartoonist (1928–2006)

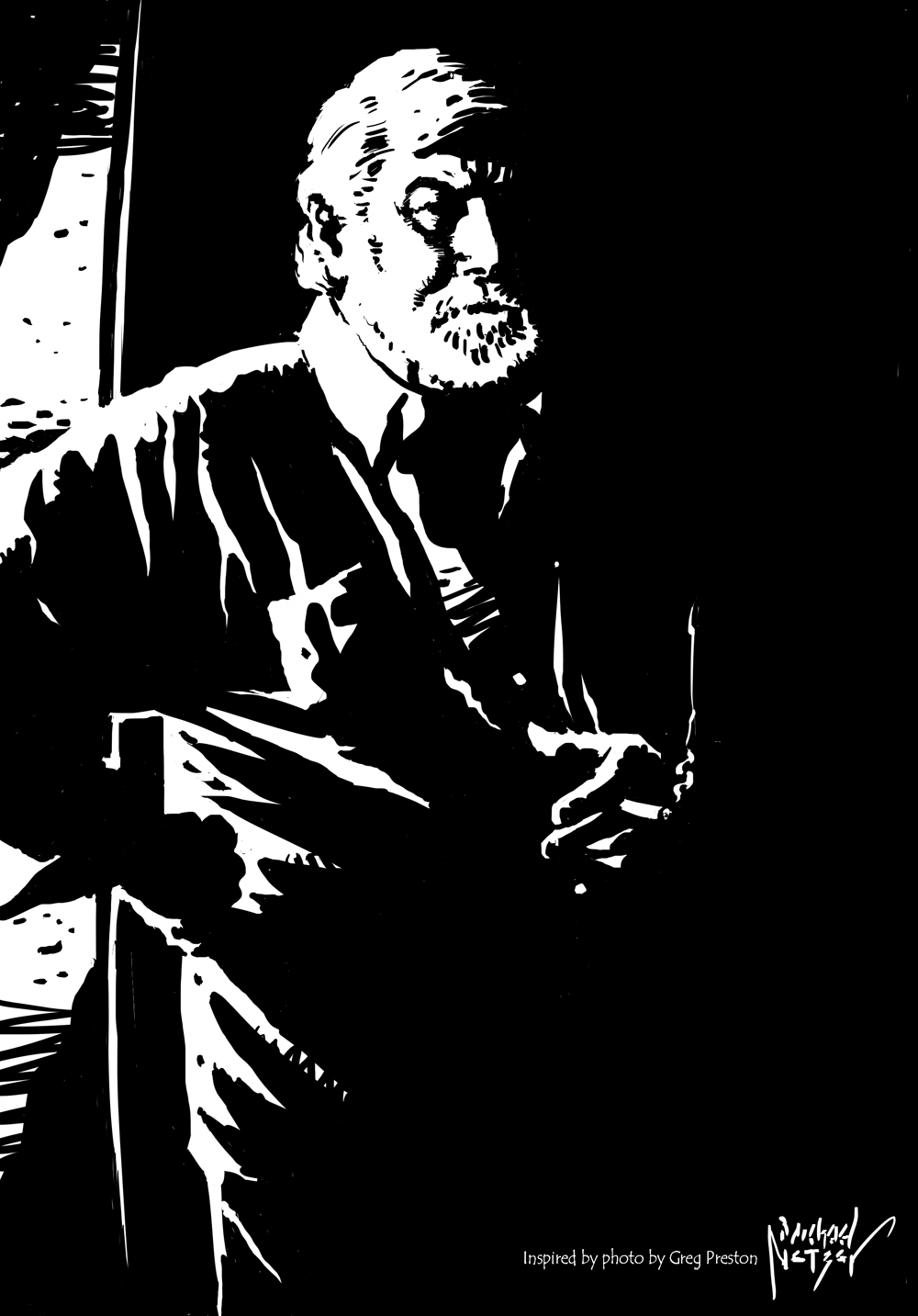
- Alex Toth by Michael Netzer
- Born: June 25, 1928 New York City, U.S.
- Died: May 27, 2006 (aged 77) Burbank, California, U.S.
- Areas: Artist, animator
- Notable works: Space Ghost; Birdman and the Galaxy Trio; The Herculoids; Jonny Quest; Moby Dick and Mighty Mightor; The Fantastic Four; Scooby-Doo, Where Are You!; Super Friends; Thundarr the Barbarian
- Children: 4

Alexander Toth (/toʊθ/; June 25, 1928 – May 27, 2006) was an American cartoonist active from the 1940s through the 1980s. Toth's work began in the American comic book industry, but he is also known for his animation designs for Hanna-Barbera throughout the 1960s and 1970s. He came to Hanna Barbera in 1964 to do designs for Jonny Quest and his work included Super Friends, Fantastic Four, Space Ghost, Sealab 2020, The Herculoids and Birdman. Toth's work has been resurrected in the late-night, adult-themed spin-offs on Cartoon Network's late night sister channel Adult Swim: Space Ghost Coast to Coast, Sealab 2021 and Harvey Birdman, Attorney at Law.

He was inducted into the comic book industry's Jack Kirby Hall of Fame in 1990.

== Biography ==
=== Early life and career ===
Alex Toth was born in 1928 to immigrants from Hungary. His father was Sandor Toth, a coal miner, and also musician of Calvinist religion who hailed from Bodroghalász, Hungary, and his mother was the Roman Catholic Mary Elizabeth Hufnagel, who hailed from Budapest. His parents, Alexander Tóth and Mary Hufnagel, married in Hamilton, Ontario, on October 27, 1924, and afterward moved to Manhattan, where Alex Toth was born. His paternal grandparents were Sámuel Tóth, a wine and grape farmer in Bodroghalász, and Erzsébet Menyhért; his maternal grandparents were József Hufnagel a farmer from Torontál County and Mária Kroppa.

Toth's talent was noticed early, and a teacher from his poster class in junior high school urged him to devote himself to art. Enrolling in the School of Industrial Art, Toth studied illustration. He began his career when he sold his first freelance art at the age of 15, subsequently illustrating true stories for Heroic magazine through a comic book packager named Steve Douglas. Although he initially aimed to do newspaper strips ("It was my dream to do what Caniff, Raymond, and Foster had done"), he found the industry "dying" and instead moved into comic books.

After graduating from the School of Industrial Art in 1947, Toth was hired by Sheldon Mayer at National/DC Comics. Green Lantern #28 (Oct.–Nov. 1947) was one of the first comics he drew for the company. He drew four issues of All Star Comics including issues #38 and #41 in which the Black Canary first met the Justice Society of America and then joined the team. A canine sidekick for Green Lantern named Streak was introduced in Green Lantern #30 (Feb.–March 1948) and the dog proved so popular that he became the featured character on several covers of the series starting with #34. He worked at DC for five years, drawing the Golden Age versions of the Flash, Doctor Mid-Nite, and the Atom. In addition to superheroes, Toth drew Western comics for DC including All-Star Western. He was assigned to the "Johnny Thunder" feature in All-Star Western because editor Julius Schwartz considered him to be "my best artist at the time." Toth and writer Robert Kanigher co-created Rex the Wonder Dog in 1952.

For a brief time in 1950, Toth was able to realize his dream of working on newspaper comic strips by ghost illustrating Casey Ruggles with Warren Tufts. In 1952 Toth ended his contract with DC Comics and moved to California. It is during that time that he worked on crime, war and romance comics for Standard Comics. In 1954, Toth was drafted into the U.S. Army and stationed in Tokyo, Japan. While in Japan, he wrote and drew his own weekly adventure strip, Jon Fury, for the base paper, Depot Diary. He served in the Army until 1956.

=== Animation and later career ===
Space Ghost, one of Toth's most famous designs

Returning to the United States in 1956, Toth settled in the Los Angeles area and worked primarily for Dell Comics until 1960. In that year, Toth became art director for the Space Angel animated science fiction show. This led to his being hired by Hanna-Barbera, where he created the character Space Ghost for the animated series of the same name. His other creations include The Herculoids, Birdman and the Galaxy Trio, and Dino Boy in the Lost Valley. He worked as a storyboard and design artist until 1968 and then again in 1973 when he was assigned to Australia for five months to produce the TV series Super Friends.

He continued to work in comic books, contributing to Warren Publishing's magazines Eerie, Creepy and The Rook. For DC Comics, he drew the first issue of The Witching Hour (February–March 1969) and introduced the series' three witches. Toth illustrated the comic book tie-in to the Hot Wheels animated series based on the toy line. His collaboration with writer Bob Haney on the four page story "Dirty Job" in Our Army at War #241 (Feb. 1972), has been described as a "true masterpiece". Toth worked with writer/editor Archie Goodwin on the story "Burma Sky" in Our Fighting Forces #146 (Dec. 1973 – Jan. 1974) and Goodwin praised Toth's art in a 1998 interview: "To me, having Alex Toth do any kind of airplane story, it's a joy for me. If I see a chance to do something like that, I will. He did a really fabulous job on it." The two men crafted a Batman story for Detective Comics #442 (Aug.–Sept. 1974) as well. Toth and E. Nelson Bridwell produced a framing sequence for the Super Friends feature in Limited Collectors' Edition #C-41 (Dec. 1975 – Jan. 1976). Toth's final work for DC was the cover for Batman Black and White #4 (Sept. 1996).

=== Personal life ===
Alex Toth was the father of four children, sons Eric and Damon and daughters Dana and Carrie. His marriage to Christina Schaber Hyde ended in divorce in 1968, and his second wife, Guyla Avery, died in 1985.

=== Death ===
Toth died of heart failure at his drawing table on May 27, 2006, four weeks shy of his 78th birthday.

== Legacy ==
Toth did much of his comics work outside superhero comics, concentrating instead on such subjects as hot rod racing, romance, horror, and action-adventure. His work on Disney's Zorro has been reprinted in trade paperback form several times. Also, there are two volumes of The Alex Toth Reader, published by Pure Imagination, which focuses on his work for Standard Comics and Western Publishing. Brian Bolland has cited Toth as one of his idols.

Journalist Tom Spurgeon wrote that Toth possessed "an almost transcendent understanding of the power of art as a visual story component", and called him "one of the handful of people who could seriously enter into Greatest Comic Book Artist of All-Time discussions" and "a giant of 20th-century cartoon design".

Toth was known for his exhaustive study of other artists and his outspoken analysis of comics art past and present. For example, in a 2001 interview he criticized the trend of fully painted comics, saying "It could be comics if those who know how to paint also knew how to tell a story! Who knew what pacing was, and didn't just jam a lot of pretty pictures together into a page, pages, and call it a story, continuity! It ain't!" Toth lamented what he saw as a lack of awareness on the part of younger artists of their predecessors, as well as a feeling that the innocent fun of comics' past was being lost in the pursuit of pointless nihilism and mature content.

In the 1990s and 2000s, he contributed to the magazines Comic Book Artist and Alter Ego, writing the columns "Before I Forget" and "Who Cares? I Do!", respectively. In 2006, James Counts and Billy Ingram compiled personal anecdotes, hundreds of unseen sketches from famous Alex Toth comic and animated works combined with correspondence with friend and comics dealer John Hitchcock in the book Dear John: The Alex Toth Doodle Book (Octopus Press). Launched at ComicCon 2006, the first printing sold out within weeks of first publication.

Film director Michael Almereyda said Toth was a formative influence on his youth, and credits Toth's long interest in Nikola Tesla as the catalyst for Almereyda's biographical drama Tesla:

... part of my fascination came from a great comic book artist, a guy who within his own framework is called a genius, named Alex Toth. He's a visual storyteller that I'll always be learning from, and anyone who cares about narrative through pictures: he's a brilliant man. But he was illustrating really stupid stories. Alex befriended me when I was a teenager and I would go over to his house and chain smoke ... and he would talk about Nikola Tesla. That's how I learned about Tesla, through Alex Toth.

DC Comics will publish a collection of Toth's work titled DC Universe by Alex Toth: The Deluxe Edition in 2026.

== Awards and recognition ==
- Inkpot Award from San Diego Comic-Con, 1981
- Inducted into the comic book industry's Jack Kirby Hall of Fame in 1990.

== Bibliography ==
=== DC Comics ===
- Adventure Comics #418–419 (Black Canary); #425, 431, 495–497 (1972–1983)
- Adventures of Rex the Wonder Dog #1–3 (1952)
- All-American Comics #88 (Doctor Mid-Nite); #92, 96, 98–99 (Green Lantern); #100–102 (Johnny Thunder) (1947–1948)
- All-American Western #103–125 (Johnny Thunder) (1948–1952)
- All Star Comics #37–38, 40–41 (Justice Society of America) (1947–1948)
- All-Star Western #58–61, 63 (1951–1952)
- Blackhawk #260 (1983)
- The Brave and the Bold #53 (the Atom and the Flash team-up) (1964)
- Comic Cavalcade #26–28 (Green Lantern) (1948)
- Dale Evans Comics #1–11 (1948–1950)
- Danger Trail #1–5 (1950–1951)
- DC Comics Presents #84 (Superman and the Challengers of the Unknown team-up) (1985)
- Detective Comics #174 (Roy Raymond); #442 (Batman) (1951–1974)
- Flash Comics #102 (1948)
- Girls' Love Stories #1–2, 4 (1949–1950)
- Girls' Romances #2, 13, 120 (1950–1966)
- Green Lantern #28, 30–31, 34–38 (1947–1949)
- Green Lantern vol. 2 #171 (1983)
- Hot Wheels #1–5 (1970)
- House of Mystery #109, 120, 149, 182, 184, 187, 190, 194 (1961–1971)
- House of Secrets #48, 63–67, 83, 123 (1961–1974)
- Jimmy Wakely #1–15 (1949–1952)
- Limited Collectors' Edition #C-41 (Super Friends) (1975)
- My Greatest Adventure #58, 60–61, 77, 81, 85 (1961–1964)
- Mystery in Space #1, 7 (1951–1952)
- Our Army at War #235, 241, 254 (1971–1973)
- Our Fighting Forces #134, 146 (1971–1973)
- Plop! #11 (1975)
- Rip Hunter... Time Master #6–7 (1962)
- Romance Trail #1–4, 6 (1949–1950)
- Secret Hearts #114, 141–143, 149 (1966–1971)
- Sensation Comics #91–92, 107 (1949–1952)
- Sensation Mystery #114 (1953)
- Sinister House of Secret Love #3 (1972)
- Star Spangled War Stories #164 (1972)
- Strange Adventures #8–9, 12–13, 17–19 (1951–1952)
- Superman Annual #9 (1983)
- Weird War Tales #5, 6, 10 (1972-1973)
- Weird Western Tales #14 (1972)
- The Witching Hour #1, 3, 8, 10–12 (1969–1970)
- World's Finest Comics #54, 66 (1951–1953)
- Young Love #74, 78–79 (1969–1970)
- Young Romance #163–164 (1969–1970)

=== Dell Comics ===
- Colt .45 #6 (1960)
- The Flying A's Range Rider #17 (1957)
- Four Color #790, 822, 845–846, 877, 882, 889, 907, 920, 914, 933, 951, 960, 976, 992, 1003, 1018, 1014, 1024, 1041, 1069, 1066, 1071, 1085, 1105–1106, 1134, 1159, 1180, 1265 (1957–1962)
- The Frogmen #5 (1963)
- Hugh O'Brian, Famous Marshal Wyatt Earp #10, 13 (1960–1961)
- Jace Pearson's Tales of the Texas Rangers #15–16 (1957)
- Lawman #4 (1960)
- Maverick #10, 13 (1960)
- Rex Allen #24 (1957)
- The Rifleman #3, 6 (1960–1961)
- Rin Tin Tin and Rusty #34, 36 (1960–1961)
- Roy Rogers and Trigger #111, 119–124 (1957–1958)
- Voyage to the Deep #3 (1963)
- Wagon Train #5 (1960)
- Western Roundup #18 (1957)
- Zorro #9, 12 (1960–1961)

=== Gold Key Comics ===
- Boris Karloff Tales of Mystery #5 (1963)
- Darby O'Gill and the Little People #1 (1970)
- Mystery Comics Digest #3, 5, 12, 21 (1972–1975)
- Twilight Zone #3–4, 25 (1963–1968)
- Walt Disney Comics Digest #9, 35, 39, 52 (1969–1975)
- Walt Disney Presents Zorro #1–2, 4–5, 7–9 (1966–1968)
- Walt Disney Showcase #34 (1976)

=== Marvel Comics ===
- Justice #41 (1953)
- Love Romances #49, 53 (1955)
- Lovers #67 (1955)
- My Love Story #7 (1957)
- My Own Romance #55 (1957)
- Rawhide Kid #46 (1965)
- TV Stars #3 (Space Ghost) (1978)
- Western Gunfighters #24 (1957)
- X-Men #12 (1965)

=== Standard Comics ===
- Adventures into Darkness #5, 8–9 (1952–1953)
- Battlefront #5 (1952)
- Best Romance #5 (1952)
- Crime Files #5 (1952)
- Exciting War #8 (1953)
- Fantastic Worlds #5–6 (1952)
- Intimate Love #19, 21–22, 26 (1952–1954)
- Jet Fighters #5, 7 (1952–1953)
- Joe Yank #5–6, 8, 10, 15 (1952–1954)
- Lost Worlds #5–6 (1952)
- My Real Love #5 (1952)
- New Romances #10–11, 14, 16–20 (1952–1954)
- Out of the Shadows #5–6, 10–12 (1952–1954)
- Popular Romance #22–27 (1953–1954)
- This Is War #5–6, 9 (1952–1953)
- Thrilling Romances #19, 22–24 (1952–1954)
- Today's Romance #6 (1952)
- The Unseen #5–6, 12–13 (1952–1954)

=== Warren Publishing ===
- Blazing Combat #1–4 (1965–1966)
- Creepy #5, 7, 23, 75–80, 91, 114, 122–125, 139, Annual #1 (1965–1982)
- Eerie #2–3, 14, 16, 51, 64–65, 67, Annual #1 (1966–1975)
- The Rook Magazine #3–4 (1980)
- U.F.O. and Alien Comix #1 (1977)
- Vampirella #90, 108, 110 (1980–1982)
- Warren Presents #3 (1979)
