= Secret Origins =

US comic book

- Brian Bolland's cover to the 1989 Secret Origins collection.

Publication information
- Publisher: DC Comics
- Schedule: Monthly
- Format: Ongoing series
- Genre: Superhero
- Publication date: One-shot: Summer 1961; Vol. 1 February–March 1973; October–November 1974; Vol. 2: April 1986 – August 1990; Vol. 3: June 2014 – May 2015
- No. of issues: One-shot: 1 Vol. 1: 7 Vol. 2: 50, plus 3 Annuals and 1 Special; Vol. 3: 11
- Editor(s): Roy Thomas; Mark Waid

Collected editions
- Secret Origins: ISBN 0-930289-50-1

Secret Origins is the title of several comic book series published by DC Comics which featured the origin stories of the publisher's various characters.

== Publication history ==
Secret Origins was first published as a one-shot in 1961 and contained only reprinted material. The title became an ongoing reprint series in February–March 1973 which ran for seven issues and ended in October–November 1974. The title was used on various compilations of origin stories, including Limited Collectors' Edition #C-39: Secret Origins Super-Villains (October–November 1975) and #C-45: More Secret Origins Super-Villains (June–July 1976) as well as DC Special Series #10 (1978) and 19 (Fall 1979). Its most well-known incarnation was a 50-issue series that ran from April 1986 to August 1990, plus three Annuals and one Special. Typically, an issue would clarify the post-Crisis origins of a number of characters, usually two as most of the issues were double-sized, i.e. 48 pages. Roy Thomas was the initial writer/editorial consultant on the series; later issues were overseen by Mark Waid. Two more Specials followed in 1998 and 1999. In 2004, it returned to the all-reprint format with a Weird Secret Origins special featuring Doctor Fate, the Spectre, Animal Man, Enchantress, Metamorpho, Congorilla, El Diablo, and Bizarro World.

A new monthly incarnation focusing on characters in The New 52, launched in April 2014 with a June cover date. The first issue featured the origins of Superman, Supergirl and the Dick Grayson version of Robin. This series was cancelled as of issue #11 (May 2015).

== Characters featured in the 1986–1990 series ==
- #1 (April 1986): The Golden Age Superman; this was intended as a tribute to the original version of the character, as the latter-day version of Superman was being concurrently introduced by John Byrne in The Man of Steel miniseries; art by Golden Age Superman artist Wayne Boring and Jerry Ordway.
- #2 (May 1986): The Blue Beetle, both the Dan Garrett and Ted Kord versions; art by Gil Kane.
- #3 (June 1986): Captain Marvel credited by the Shazam! title; a retelling of the story from WHIZ Comics #2, albeit updated to the modern day. Much of this was changed in the Legends crossover. Thomas himself would retcon this some months later in SHAZAM! The New Beginning, all of which was changed again by Jerry Ordway in his graphic novel The Power of Shazam!.
- #4 (July 1986): Firestorm (Ronnie Raymond).
- #5 (August 1986): the original Crimson Avenger; art by Gene Colan.
- #6 (September 1986): Halo of the Outsiders; the Golden Age Batman. This was the first double-sized issue.
- #7 (October 1986): Guy Gardner; the Golden Age Sandman
- #8 (November 1986): Shadow Lass; Doll Man.
- #9 (December 1986): The original Star-Spangled Kid (Skyman) and Stripesy; the Golden Age Flash.
- #10 (January 1987): The Phantom Stranger. This was a Legends tie-in that related four possible origins for the character; one by Mike Barr and Jim Aparo was a variation on the Wandering Jew myth, while another by Alan Moore and Joe Orlando postulated that the Stranger was a fallen angel.
- #11 (February 1987): the Golden Age Hawkman; Power Girl. Both stories presented have since been retconned, with Power Girl's backstory being redefined by Geoff Johns in the pages of JSA Classified, which served as part of the buildup to Infinite Crisis.
- #12 (March 1987): The Challengers of the Unknown; Fury.
- #13 (April 1987): Nightwing (art by Erik Larsen); Johnny Thunder and Thunderbolt; the Whip.
- #14 (May 1987): Suicide Squad. Another Legends tie-in, it served as a prequel to the later series and was written by that series' writer, John Ostrander.
- #15 (June 1987): The Spectre; Deadman.
- #16 (July 1987): Hourman; the Warlord; 'Mazing Man.
- #17 (August 1987): Adam Strange; Doctor Occult.
- #18 (September 1987): The Golden Age Green Lantern (Alan Scott); Creeper.
- #19 (October 1987): Uncle Sam; the Guardian.
- #20 (November 1987): Batgirl; Doctor Mid-Nite.
- #21 (December 1987): Jonah Hex; Black Condor.
- #22 (January 1988): Manhunters. This was a tie-in with Millennium as was the subsequent issue, and aligned the various histories of the characters with the Manhunter name together.
- #23 (February 1988): the Guardians of the Universe written by Todd Klein; the Floronic Man written by Rick Veitch.
- #24 (March 1988): Doctor Fate; Blue Devil. Mark Waid became editor beginning with this issue.
- #25 (April 1988): The Legion of Super-Heroes (now apocryphal); the Golden Age Atom.
- #26 (May 1988): Black Lightning; Miss America.
- #27 (June 1988): Zatanna, her father Zatara, and Doctor Mist.
- #28 (July 1988): Midnight art by Gil Kane; Nightshade art by Rob Liefeld. Nightshade's origin doubled as an introduction/backdrop to a three-issue Suicide Squad story arc where she returned to her place of origin to save her brother.
- #29 (August 1988): The Atom; the Red Tornado (Ma Hunkel; this was Sheldon Mayer's last comic book story); Mr. America (a.k.a. the Americommando).
- #30 (September 1988): Plastic Man; Elongated Man.
- #31 (October 1988): The Justice Society of America. A full-length story, and Roy Thomas' last contribution to the series, excluding the Grim Ghost story in #42.
- #32 (November 1988): The Justice League. In a full-length story by Keith Giffen and Peter David, the Justice League is formed by Green Lantern (Hal Jordan), the Flash (Barry Allen), Aquaman, the Martian Manhunter and the Black Canary. Superman and Batman were not founding members, and Wonder Woman's revised continuity precluded her from the same. The events depicted were later expanded upon in JLA: Year One and JLA: Incarnations.
- #33 (December 1988): Fire, Ice and Mister Miracle. This and the subsequent two issues dealt with the members of Justice League International.
- #34 (Winter 1988): Captain Atom, G'nort and Rocket Red.
- #35 (Holiday 1988): Booster Gold, Maxwell Lord, and the Martian Manhunter rendered apocryphal by events and revelations in J'onn J'onnz' later solo series.
- #36 (January 1989): Green Lantern (Hal Jordan) story by Jim Owsley; Poison Ivy story by Neil Gaiman.
- #37 (February 1989): The Legion of Substitute Heroes; the original Doctor Light.
- #38 (March 1989): The Green Arrow and Speedy.
- #39 (April 1989): Animal Man story by Grant Morrison; the Man-Bat.
- #40 (May 1989): Congorilla, Detective Chimp, and Gorilla Grodd.
- #41 (June 1989): The Rogues - the Weather Wizard, Heat Wave, the Trickster, the Pied Piper, Captain Boomerang, and Captain Cold.
- #42 (July 1989): Phantom Girl; the Gay Ghost/Grim Ghost.
- #43 (August 1989): The original Hawk and Dove; Cave Carson; Chris KL-99.
- #44 (September 1989): Clayface I, II, III and IV. This issue gave background information for a story arc that appeared in Detective Comics #604-607 entitled The Mud Pack.
- #45 (October 1989): Blackhawk; El Diablo.
- #46 (December 1989): The headquarters of the Silver Age Justice League of America (story by Grant Morrison), the New Titans' Titans Tower, and the 'rocketship clubhouse' of the Legion of Super Heroes. Arm Fall Off Boy makes his first appearance.
- #47 (February 1990): Ferro Lad, Karate Kid, and Chemical King.
- #48 (April 1990): Ambush Bug, Stanley and His Monster, Rex the Wonder Dog, and the Trigger Twins.
- #49 (June 1990): Bouncing Boy, the Newsboy Legion, and the Silent Knight.
- #50 (August 1990): a 96-page last issue. This consisted of a prose retelling of Dick Grayson's first encounter with Batman by Dennis O'Neil and George Pérez; the first meeting of the Golden and Silver Age Flashes story by Grant Morrison; how Johnny Thunder (the western hero) came to be; the definitive history of Black Canary; and the stories behind the Dolphin and the Space Museum.

=== Annuals and Specials ===
- Annual #1 (1987): the Doom Patrol art by John Byrne; Captain Comet.
- Annual #2 (1988): The second and third Flashes (Barry Allen and Wally West).
- Annual #3 (1989): the Teen Titans. This was an anniversary tribute with contributions from George Pérez, Tom Grummett, Irv Novick, Dave Cockrum, Kevin Maguire, and Colleen Doran. It also included five pages of Who's Who entries on Flamebird, the Golden Eagle, Bumblebee, Herald, the Antithesis and the Gargoyle.
- Special #1 (1989): the Penguin by Alan Grant and Sam Kieth, the Riddler by Neil Gaiman, Matt Wagner and Bernie Mireault, and Two-Face by Mark Verheiden and Pat Broderick.

Additionally, there was a belated Secret Origins 80-Page Giant issued in 1998 (ISBN 1-56389-440-8), that focused on the members of Young Justice.

== Secret Origins collected edition ==
Some issues of the second series were collected in a trade paperback along with other material and some original work in 1989 called Secret Origins, but the official title, as stated in the book's indicia, is given as Secret Origins of The World's Greatest Super-Heroes (ISBN 0930289501). The focus was on DC's major characters: the origins of the Justice League of America (from #32), the Flash (Barry Allen, from Secret Origins Annual #2); Green Lantern (Hal Jordan, from #36); J'onn J'onnz, the Martian Manhunter (from #35); and Superman (from The Man of Steel #6). There was also an all-new retelling of Batman's origins, Batman: The Man Who Falls, by Dennis O'Neil and Dick Giordano; this story later served as a cited inspiration for the 2005 film Batman Begins.

- Showcase Presents: Blue Beetle includes Secret Origins #2 (Blue Beetle: Echoes Of Future Past!). 590 pages. January 2015. 9781401251475
- Batman: The Greatest Stories Ever Told Vol. 2 includes Secret Origins #6 (The Secret Origin Of Batman). 208 pages. February 2007. 9781401212148
- Batman: Legends Of The Dark Knight - Marshall Rogers includes Secret Origins #6 (The Secret Origin Of Batman). 484 pages. November 2011. 9781401232276
- Last Days Of The Justice Society Of America includes Secret Origins #7 (The Secret Origin Of The Golden Age Sandman), #9 (The Secret Origin Of The Star-Spangled Kid And Stripesy & The Secret Origin Of The Golden Age Flash), #11 (The Secret Origin Of The Golden Age Hawkman), #13 (The Secret Origin Of Johnny Thunder), #15 (The Secret Origin Of The Spectre), #16 (The Secret Origin Of The Golden Age Hourman), #18 (The Secret Origin Of The Golden Age Green Lantern), #20 (The Secret Origin Of Dr. Mid-Nite), #24 (The Secret Origin Of Dr. Fate), #25 (The Secret Origin Of The Golden Age Atom) and #31 (The Secret Origin Of The Justice Society Of America). 336 pages. May 2017. 9781401267339
- The Phantom Stranger Omnibus includes Secret Origins #10 (The Secret Origin Of The Phantom Stranger). 1248 pages. August 2023. 9781779506030
- DC Universe by Alan Moore includes Secret Origins #10 (Footsteps). 464 pages. April 2013. 9781401233402
- Nightwing: Old Friends, New Enemies includes Secret Origins #13 (The Secret Origin Of Nightwing). 156 pages. August 2013. 9781401240455
- Suicide Squad: Trial By Fire includes Secret Origins #14 (The Secret Origin Of The Suicide Squad). 229 pages. February 2011. 9781401230050
- Deadman Omnibus includes Secret Origins #15 (Death Like A Crown). 944 pages. December 2020. 9781779504883
- Doom Patrol: The Bronze Age Omnibus includes Secret Origins Annual #1 (The Secret Origin Of The Doom Patrol). 1056 pages. November 2019. 9781401298838
- The Flash: A Celebration Of 75 Years includes Secret Origins Annual #2 (The Unforgiving Minute). 480 pages. April 2015. 9781401251789
- Justice League International Omnibus Vol. 3 includes Secret Origins #33, 34 and 35. 1448 pages. May 2024. 9781779525642
- DC Universe by Neil Gaiman includes Secret Origins #36 (Pavane) and Secret Origins Special. 224 pages. October 2016. 9781401264888
- Green Arrow: The Longbow Hunters Saga Omnibus Vol. 1 includes Secret Origins #38 (Sometimes A Fool Notion). 1527 pages. September 2020. 9781779502568
- Animal Man: Origin Of The Species includes Secret Origins #39 (The Myth Of The Creation). 224 pages. July 2002. 9781563898907
- JLA by Grant Morrison Omnibus includes Secret Origins #46 (Ghosts Of Stone). 1486 pages. November 2020. 9781779504999
- Showcase Presents: Ambush Bug includes Secret Origins #48 (The Secret Origin Of Ambush Bug). 488 pages. March 2009. 9781401221805
- Tales Of The Batman: Alam Brennert includes Secret Origins #50 (Unfinished Business). 187 pages. July 2016. 9781401263492

== Characters featured in the 2014–15 series ==
- #1 (June 2014): Superman, Robin (Dick Grayson), Supergirl
- #2 (July 2014): Batman, Aquaman, Starfire
- #3 (August 2014): Green Lantern (Hal Jordan), Batwoman (Kate Kane), Red Robin (Tim Drake)
- #4 (September 2014): Harley Quinn, Green Arrow, Damian Wayne
- #5 (October 2014): Cyborg, Red Hood (Jason Todd), Mera
- #6 (December 2014): Wonder Woman, Deadman, Sinestro
- #7 (January 2015): Flash, Huntress, Superboy
- #8 (February 2015): Dick Grayson, Animal Man, Katana
- #9 (March 2015): Swamp Thing, Power Girl, Green Lantern (John Stewart)
- #10 (April 2015): Batgirl, Firestorm, Poison Ivy
- #11 (May 2015): Black Canary, Green Lantern (Guy Gardner), John Constantine

=== Collected editions 2014–15 series ===
- Secret Origins Volume 1 - collects Secret Origins (vol. 3) #1-4 (Feb. 2015)
- Secret Origins Volume 2 - collects Secret Origins (vol. 3) #5-11 (Aug. 2015)

== Secret Origins of Super-Heroes ==
During 52, Weeks 12 through 51 featured two-page origins of various superheroes, written by Mark Waid. The origins featured were:

- Week 12: Wonder Woman
- Week 13: Elongated Man
- Week 14: Metamorpho
- Week 15: Steel
- Week 16: Black Adam
- Week 17: Lobo
- Week 18: Question
- Week 19: Animal Man
- Week 20: Adam Strange
- Week 22: Green Lantern
- Week 23: Wildcat
- Week 24: Booster Gold
- Week 25: Nightwing
- Week 26: Hawkman and Hawkgirl
- Week 27: Black Canary
- Week 28: Catman
- Week 30: Metal Men
- Week 31: Robin
- Week 32: Blue Beetle
- Week 33: Martian Manhunter
- Week 34: Zatanna
- Week 36: Power Girl
- Week 37: Firestorm
- Week 38: Red Tornado
- Week 39: Mr. Terrific
- Week 41: Starfire
- Week 42: Green Arrow
- Week 43: Plastic Man
- Week 46: Batman
- Week 47: Teen Titans
- Week 48: Birds of Prey
- Week 49: Justice Society of America
- Week 51: Justice League

== Secret Origins of Super-Villains ==
Beginning with #37, each issue of Countdown featured the origins of a supervillain, written by Scott Beatty. The origins are:

- #37: Poison Ivy
- #36: Deathstroke
- #35: Parallax
- #34: Lex Luthor
- #33: Riddler
- #32: Eclipso
- #31: Joker
- #30: General Zod
- #29: Penguin
- #28: Trickster and the Pied Piper
- #27: Two-Face
- #25: Killer Frost
- #24: DeSaad
- #23: Mister Mxyzptlk
- #22: Deadshot
- #21: Granny Goodness
- #20: Mister Mind
- #19: Scarecrow
- #18: Dr. Light
- #17: The Monarch
- #16: Sinestro
- #15: Doomsday
- #14: Gorilla Grodd
- #13: The Cyborg Superman
- #12: Circe
- #11: Solomon Grundy
- #10: Harley Quinn
- #9: Black Manta
- #8: Bizarro
- #7: Bane
- #6: Felix Faust
- #5: Mr. Freeze
- #4: Ra's al Ghul
- #3: Amazo
- #2: Darkseid

== See also ==
- Secret Files and Origins
