= All-Star Western =

American comic book series

- Cover to All-Star Western #58 (Apr-May 1951), art by Gil Kane and Frank Giacoia.

Publication information
- Publisher: DC Comics
- Schedule: Bi-monthly
- Format: Ongoing series
- Publication date: (vol. 1): May 1951 – July 1961 (vol. 2): Sep. 1970 – May 1972 (vol. 3): Sep. 2011 – Aug. 2014
- No. of issues: (vol. 1): 62 (vol. 2): 11 (vol. 3): 34 + 0
- Main character(s): (vol. 1); Super-Chief; Johnny Thunder; Trigger Twins (vol. 2); Jonah Hex; Bat Lash; El Diablo; Outlaw; Pow-Wow Smith (vol. 3); Jonah Hex; Amadeus Arkham

Creative team
- Written by: (vol. 1); Gardner Fox; Robert Kanigher; David Wood (vol. 2) John Albano (vol. 3); Justin Gray; Jimmy Palmiotti
- Penciller(s): (vol. 1); Gil Kane; Carmine Infantino; Alex Toth (vol. 2); Tony DeZuniga (vol. 3); Moritat; Staz Johnson; Cliff Richards

All-Star Western is the name of three American comic book series published by DC Comics, each a Western fiction omnibus featuring both continuing characters and anthological stories. The first ran from 1951 to 1961, the second from 1970 to 1972 and the third was part of The New 52 and ran from September 2011 to August 2014.

== Publication history ==
=== Vol. 1 ===
The original All-Star Western began with #58 (May 1951), having taken over the number of its predecessor title, All Star Comics — a superhero omnibus that years before had introduced the enduring team the Justice Society of America. With the postwar decline in the popularity of superheroes, publisher DC Comics changed the series format and title. All-Star Western ran 62 bimonthly issues through #119 (July 1961). The cover logo did not include a hyphen until issue #108 (Sept. 1959), when it was much reduced in size and placed above the much larger logo for what was then the title feature, "Johnny Thunder". Johnny Thunder remained on the cover until the final issue, #119, occasionally sharing it with Madame .44, "the masked outlaw queen".

The first issue contained the features "The Trigger Twins", created by writer Robert Kanigher and penciler Carmine Infantino and running through #116; "Don Caballero", drawn by Gil Kane, and "Roving Ranger", penciled by Alex Toth, the writer-creator uncredited; and "Strong Bow", created by writer David Wood and artist Frank Giacoia. Other features that appeared through the years included "Super-Chief", by writer Gardner Fox and artist Infantino; and, beginning with #67 (Nov. 1952), "Johnny Thunder", featuring the masked, vigilante persona of a schoolteacher in an Old West Mormon settlement. The character had been created by writer Kanigher and artist Toth in DC's All-American Comics in 1948.

=== Vol. 2 ===
Cover to All-Star Western vol. 2 #1 (Aug-Sept. 1970), art by Carmine Infantino and Joe Giella.

The series was revived in the following decade, and ran 11 bimonthly issues (Sept. 1970 – May 1972) before changing its title and, slightly, its format to become Weird Western Tales. All-Star Western vol. 2, #1 starred Pow-Wow Smith, scripted by John Broome, with art by Carmine Infantino. The next four starred the characters Outlaw and El Diablo. With issue #5, the character Outlaw was dropped, with the cover logo "Outlaw" now referring to the replacement-feature star, Billy the Kid. The Western "all-stars" now included such historical characters as Wild Bill Hickok, Buffalo Bill and Davy Crockett, in a mix of new stories and reprints, as well as DC stalwarts Pow-Wow Smith, El Diablo and Bat Lash.

Issue #10 (February–March 1972) introduced the enduring and popular character Jonah Hex, created by writer John Albano and artist Tony DeZuniga. Hex continued as the star of the comic when it changed its name to Weird Western Tales with issue #12 (July 1972), and he continued into issue #38 (Feb. 1977) of the 59-issue series.

=== Vol. 3 ===
The series was revived as part of the line-wide The New 52 relaunch in September 2011, written by Justin Gray and Jimmy Palmiotti with art by Moritat. The series followed the adventures of Jonah Hex and Amadeus Arkham in an Old West-version of Gotham City, with back-up tales featuring other Western characters such as:

- El Diablo - issues #2-3
- The Barbary Ghost - issues #4-6
- Nighthawk & Cinnamon - issues #7-9
- Bat Lash - issue #10
- Doctor Thirteen - issues #11-12, 18, and 20
- Tomahawk - issues #13-16
- Stormwatch - issues #17-21

After issue #21 the backup features stopped. Beginning with issue #21 the comic was about Jonah Hex and his adventures in the present. He meets the heroes of the present. Characters met in the present:

- Booster Gold - issue #19 before traveling to the present
- Batwing - issue #21
- Batman & Jeremiah Arkham - issue #22
- John Constantine - issue #24
- Swamp Thing - issue #25
- Superman - issue #26

The series was discontinued with issue #34 (released in August 2014).

== Collected editions ==
Vol. 2 of All-Star Western has been collected into Showcase Presents Jonah Hex:

- Showcase Presents Jonah Hex Vol. 1 (Billy the Kid Outlaw stories, "The Night of the Snake" feature and Jonah Hex stories from All-Star Western Vol. 2 #2-8, 10-12)

Vol. 3 of All-Star Western has been collected into the following trade paperbacks:

Title	Material collected	ISBN
Vol. 1: Guns and Gotham	All-Star Western Vol. 3 #1-6	1-4012-3709-6
Vol. 2: The War of Lords and Owls	All-Star Western Vol. 3 #7-12	1-4012-3851-3
Vol. 3: The Black Diamond Probability	All-Star Western Vol. 3 #0, #13-16	1-4012-3851-3
Vol. 4: Gold Standard	All-Star Western Vol. 3 #17-21	1-4012-4626-5
Vol. 5: Man Out Of Time	All-Star Western Vol. 3 #22-28	978-1-4012-4993-9
Vol. 6: End of the Trail	All-Star Western Vol. 3 #29-34	1-4012-5413-6
