= Rudabányácska =

Coordinates: 48°24′46″N 21°36′38″E

Rudabányácska Baňačka (Slovak)
- Former municipality
- Greek Catholic Church

- Location within Hungary
- Country: Hungary
- Regions: Northern Hungary
- County: Borsod-Abaúj-Zemplén County
- District: Sátoraljaújhely District

Area
  - Total: 12.31 km^{2} (4.75 sq mi)

Population (2022)
  - Total: 252
  - Density: 20.5/km^{2} (53.0/sq mi)
- Time zone: UTC+1 (CET)
  - Summer (DST): UTC+2 (CEST)
- Postal code: 3945
- Area code: (+36) 47

Rudabányácska (Slovak: Baňačka) also known as Bányácska was a village in Borsod-Abaúj-Zemplén County, northern Hungary. It is part of the town of Sátoraljaújhely since 1981.

== Geography ==
It lies in one of the south-eastern valleys of the Zemplén Mountains, along Route 3718.

The neighboring settlements are: Széphalom to the northeast, Sátoraljaújhely to the southeast, Kácsárd and Károlyfalva to the south, Sárospatak to the west, and Vágáshuta to the northwest.

== History ==
From the 14th century, gold and silver were mined in the area. In the 14th century, Italian miners were settled here, followed by Germans, and in the 1700s, Rusyns and Slovaks. Its Greek Catholic church was built in 1788.

Since 1959, a regular bus service has connected the village with the downtown of Sátoraljaújhely. Electricity was introduced in 1962.

The people here still speak the local Slovak dialect, which contains Slovak and Rusyn and Hungarian elements.
