= Mike Parobeck =

American comic artist (1965–1996)

- Parobeck in the 1990s
- Born: Michael J. Parobeck; July 7, 1965
- Died: July 2, 1996 (aged 30) Key West, Florida, U.S.
- Area: Penciller
- Notable works: Batman Adventures

Michael J. Parobeck (July 7, 1965 – July 2, 1996) was an American comics artist best known for his work on the Batman Adventures comic book. His artwork featured a fluid animation-inspired drawing style coupled with clear, clean layouts well-suited to the book.

== Early life ==
Mike Parobeck, one of six siblings, grew up in Lancaster, Ohio. He studied at the Central Academy of Commercial Art in Cincinnati.

== Career ==
Parobeck got to know DC Comics editor Brian Augustyn, to whom he repeatedly sent photocopies of his sample artwork. Augustyn eventually contacted Parobeck to give him a job penciling a few pages of a Doctor Light story in Secret Origins #37. This led to his first regular series work on El Diablo, with writer Gerard Jones, which lasted sixteen issues. Other important series on which he worked were The Fly for DC's short-lived Impact Comics imprint, as well as the 1992 Justice Society of America series, on both of which he worked together with writer Len Strazewski, and the Elongated Man mini-series, also from 1992.

His big breakthrough toward both critical and commercial success came with his work on Batman Adventures, a comic book tie-in to the animated TV series Batman: The Animated Series, on which he took over from Ty Templeton with issue 7. Parobeck was the regular artist until his death. Parobeck named issue 14 as his favorite issue to have drawn due to the issue focusing on Robin, who was Parobeck's favorite character to draw.

== Personal life ==
By 1995, Parobeck was living in Chicago. Halfway through his run on Batman Adventures, Parobeck was diagnosed with type one diabetes, which can be controlled by taking insulin. According to his friends, however, he was somewhat lackadaisical in this regimen, which ultimately led to his death in Key West.
