= Rawhide Kid (comic book) =

Western comic book title

- Issue #145: New cover art by Gene Colan and Steve Leialoha.

Publication information
- Publisher: Atlas Comics; Marvel Comics
- Schedule: Bimonthly
- Format: Ongoing series
- Genre: Western
- Publication date: (Atlas); Mar. 1955 – Sept. 1957 (Marvel); Aug. 1960 – May 1979
- No. of issues: 151
- Main character: Rawhide Kid

Creative team
- Written by: Stan Lee, Larry Lieber, Ron Zimmerman
- Artist(s): Bob Brown, Jack Davis
- Penciller(s): Jack Kirby, Larry Lieber
- Inker(s): Dick Ayers, John Tartaglione

Collected editions
- Marvel Masterworks: Rawhide Kid vol. 1: ISBN 0-7851-2117-X
- Marvel Masterworks: Rawhide Kid vol. 2: ISBN 0-7851-2684-8

Rawhide Kid is a comic book series featuring the character Rawhide Kid originally published by Atlas Comics, and later by Marvel Comics. It ran from 1955 to 1979, with a hiatus during the late 1950s.

== Publication history ==
The Rawhide Kid debuted in a 16-issue series (March 1955-Sept. 1957) from Marvel Comics's 1950s predecessor, Atlas Comics. Most of the covers from the series were produced by Joe Maneely or John Severin, though a handful were done by Russ Heath or Fred Kida. Interior art for the first five issues was by Bob Brown, with Dick Ayers at the reins thereafter.

After a hiatus, the Rawhide Kid was revamped for what was now Marvel Comics by writer Stan Lee, penciler Jack Kirby and inker Ayers. Continuing the Atlas numbering with issue #17 (Aug. 1960), the title now featured a diminutive yet confident, soft-spoken fast gun constantly underestimated by bullying toughs, varmints, owlhoots, polecats, and crooked saloon owners.

Kirby continued as penciler through #32 (Feb. 1963). He drew covers through issue #47. Issues #33-35 (featuring the Raven) were drawn by EC Comics veteran Jack Davis — some of the last color comics he would draw before gaining fame at the black-and-white satirical comics magazine Mad. After several issues by Ayers, followed by a single issue by long-time Kid Colt artist Jack Keller, Larry Lieber, Lee's writer brother, began his nine-year run as the series' writer-artist, which lasted over 75 issues from 1964–1973. Lieber said in 1999,

I don't remember why I wanted to do it, particularly. I think I wanted a little more freedom. I didn't do enough of the superheroes to know whether I'd like them. What I didn't prefer was the style that was developing. It didn't appeal to me. ... Maybe there was just too much humor in it, or too much something. ... I remember, at the time, I wanted to make everything serious. I didn't want to give a light tone to it. When I did Rawhide Kid, I wanted people to cry as if they were watching High Noon or something. ... I'm a little unclear about leaving the superheroes and going to Rawhide Kid. I know that at the time I wanted — what's the expression? — a little space for myself or something, and I wanted to do a little drawing again.

By 1973, as superheroes became increasingly ascendant, The Rawhide Kid became primarily a reprint title, though often bearing new covers by such prominent artists as Gene Colan, Gil Kane and Paul Gulacy. It ended publication with issue #151 (May 1979). This initial volume of the series included a single annual publication, cover-titled Rawhide Kid King-Size Special (Sept. 1971). As well, reprints, including many Jack Kirby-drawn stories, appeared in the 1968-1976 title The Mighty Marvel Western.

The Rawhide Kid later appeared as a middle-aged character in a four-issue miniseries, The Rawhide Kid (vol. 2)(Aug.-Nov. 1985), by writer Bill Mantlo and penciler Herb Trimpe.

A controversial five-issue miniseries, Rawhide Kid (vol. 3) (April–June 2003), titled "Slap Leather" was published biweekly by Marvel's mature-audience MAX imprint. Here, the character was depicted as homosexual, with a good portion of the dialogue dedicated to innuendo to this effect. The series, which was written by Ron Zimmerman, and drawn by artist John Severin, was labeled with a "Parental Advisory Explicit Content" warning on the cover. Series editor Axel Alonso said, "We thought it would be interesting to play with the genre. Enigmatic cowboy rides into dusty little desert town victimized by desperadoes, saves the day, wins everyone's heart, then rides off into the sunset, looking better than any cowboy has a right to." The camp portrayal of a gay Rawhide Kid was criticized for being largely a string of gay stereotypes that invited laughter even as the Kid played the role of the hero in the series.

A sequel miniseries, The Rawhide Kid (vol. 4) (Aug.-Nov. 2010), was rendered with a subtitle on covers as Rawhide Kid: The Sensational Seven. The sequel was again written by Zimmerman, with Howard Chaykin taking over as artist.

== Collected editions ==
- Marvel Masterworks: Rawhide Kid (hardcover, Marvel Comics):
  - Volume 1 (collects Rawhide Kid #17-25, (Marvel Comics 2006) ISBN 0-7851-2117-X)
  - Volume 2 (collects Rawhide Kid #26-35, (Marvel Comics 2007), ISBN 0-7851-2684-8)
- Essential Rawhide Kid Volume 1 (collects Rawhide Kid #17-35, trade paperback (Marvel Comics 2011), ISBN 0-7851-6394-8)
- Rawhide Kid: Slap Leather (collects Rawhide Kid: Slap Leather #1-5, trade paperback (Marvel Comics 2003), ISBN 0-7851-1069-0; hardcover (Marvel Comics 2010), ISBN 0-7851-4362-9)
