= Kácsárd =

Coordinates: 48°22′52″N 21°35′28″E

- Former municipality
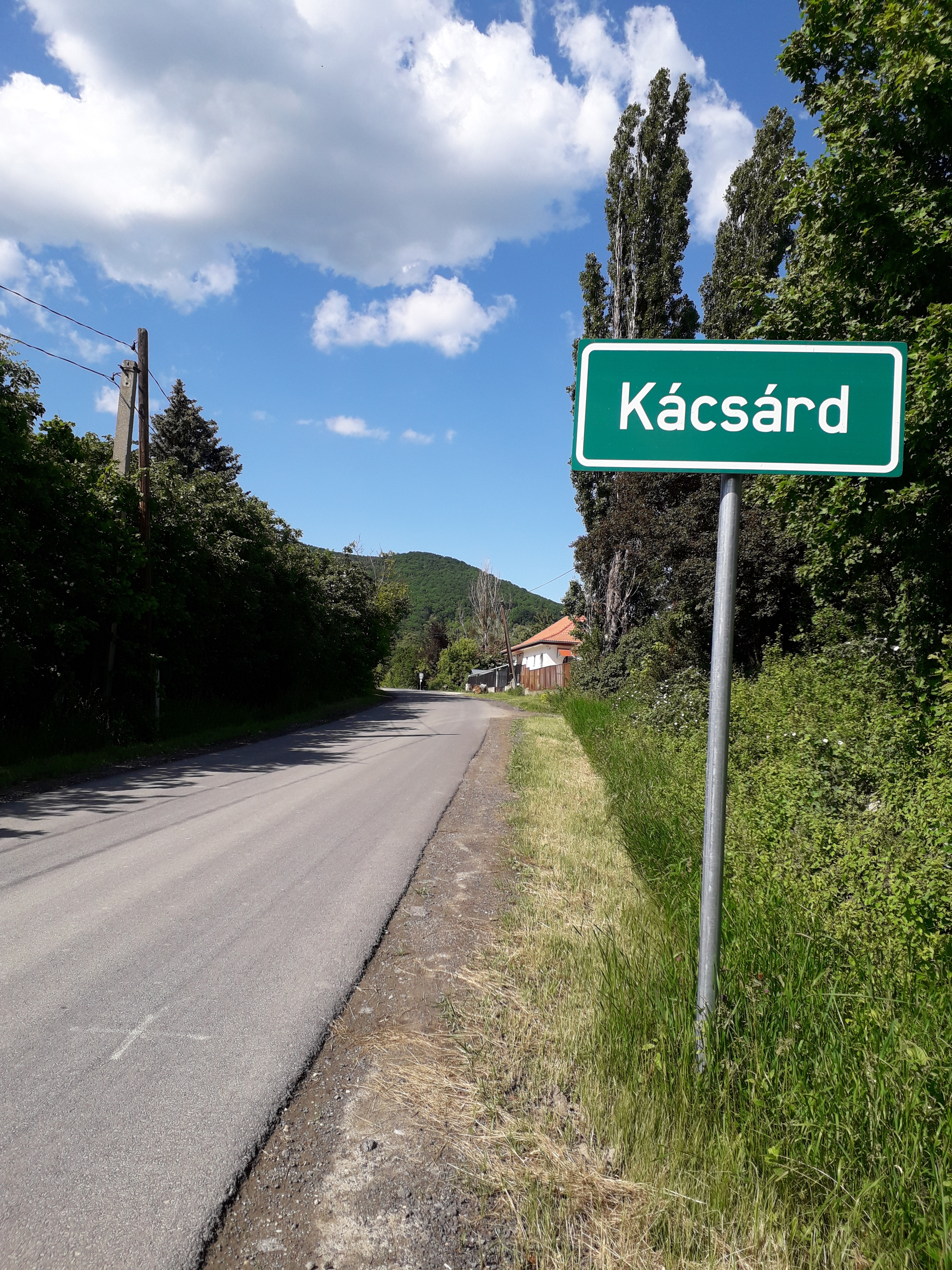
- Kácsárd town sign

- Location within Hungary
- Country: Hungary
- Regions: Northern Hungary
- County: Borsod-Abaúj-Zemplén County
- District: Sátoraljaújhely District
- Time zone: UTC+1 (CET)
  - Summer (DST): UTC+2 (CEST)
- Postal code: 3945
- Area code: (+36) 47

Kácsárd (Slovak: Kačard) was a village in Borsod-Abaúj-Zemplén County, northern Hungary. Now it is part of the town of Sátoraljaújhely.

== Geography ==
It lies in one of the south-eastern valleys of the Zemplén Mountains, along Route 3718.

The neighboring settlements are: Rudabányácska to the north, Sátoraljaújhely to the east, Károlyfalva to the south, Sárospatak to the west.

Bus 3909 stops in the village, providing a direct connection to the downtown of Sátoraljaújhely and its train station.

== History ==
Its name was first mentioned in 1580 as Kaczad.

In 1947, the village had 650 residents, a store, a school, and a kindergarten. The school was built in 1929 and operated until 1978; since then, it has been used as children's camp.

== Gallery ==
Cemetery of Kácsárd

Mountains in Sátoraljaújhely
