= Blackmark =

Publication

- The original 1971 Bantam paperback Blackmark. Cover art by Gil Kane.
- Date: January 1971
- Main characters: Blackmark
- Page count: 128 pages
- Publisher: Bantam Books

Creative team
- Writers: Archie Goodwin
- Artists: Gil Kane
- Creators: Gil Kane
- ISBN: 978-0552658713

Blackmark is a paperback book (Bantam S5871) published by the American company Bantam Books in January 1971. It is one of the first American graphic novels, predating works such as Richard Corben's Bloodstar (1976), Jim Steranko's Chandler: Red Tide (1976), Don McGregor and Paul Gulacy's Sabre (Sept. 1978), and Will Eisner's A Contract with God (Oct. 1978). It was conceived and drawn by comic book artist Gil Kane, and scripted by Archie Goodwin from an outline by Kane.

The term "graphic novel", while seen in print as early as 1964 in an obscure fan publication, was not in mainstream use in 1971 when Blackmark, a science fiction/sword-and-sorcery adventure, was first published; the back-cover blurb of the 30th-anniversary edition published in 2002 calls the book, retroactively, "the very first American graphic novel."

A 119-page story of comic-book art, with captions and word balloons, published in a traditional book format, Blackmark is the first graphic novel with an original heroic-adventure character conceived expressly for this form. It originally sold for 75 cents, comparable to other paperbacks at the time.

== Publication history ==
Detail from Blackmark (1971) by scripter Archie Goodwin and artist-plotter Gil Kane

Gil Kane — an established comics artist who helped usher in the Silver Age of comic books with his part in revamping the DC Comics characters Green Lantern and the Atom, and who drew The Amazing Spider-Man during a historically notable 1970s run — had experimented with the graphic novel form with his 1968 black-and-white comics magazine His Name is... Savage, a 40-page espionage thriller scripted by Archie Goodwin from an outline by Kane.

According to Kane in a 1996 interview, Bantam Books CEO Oscar Dystel had personally taken Kane's pitch after Kane's attorney had secured him an appointment through a mutual friend of the attorney's and Dystel's. Kane went on to say Bantam contracted for four books, and increased the order to eight after Dystel saw and liked the completed pages of the first. Kane said Bantam paid him $3,500 for 120 pages (including the cover) all written, drawn and lettered in "camera-ready" form, i.e., in completed form suitable to go immediately to the printing press. Kane recalled having to draw "30 pages in one week. Then I'd have to knock off for a week or two to make some additional money" drawing comic-book stories and, mainly, covers.

Goodwin recalled that he came in at "the 11th hour":

...Gil and I would talk about working together. ... And then Gil would get into a situation where he was ready to begin a project. I would find myself in other situations so I couldn't work on the project. He would begin getting other people to do stuff. It wouldn't work out totally to his satisfaction. He would ask me, "Gee, can you come in on this thing?" And on both [His Name is...]Savage and Blackmark, I came in on them after they were started. [After the synopsis was written], Gil and I would get involved in the breaking-down and the layout-out of the stuff and reshaping it. But we would always be reshaping it as we would go along, because by then the deadline was on us.

The 2002 reissue, in its afterword, credits cartoonist and Mad magazine founder Harvey Kurtzman as laying out a small number of pages, and another major comics artist, Neal Adams, as inking some of Kane's pencil work, both doing so as a favor to help Kane meet his deadlines. Adams' own website, however, states that Adams did not ink but rather "penciled pages 80/81/82/92/98-107 / (total of 14pgs.)" and "Neal penciled 14 pages with Gil Kane inks (pages 80,81,82,92,98-107)".

Though Bantam had envisioned a series of eight books, the publisher halted plans after the first sold less well than expected. Kane maintained that,

...they didn't do what they said they would do, which was originally to put two or three of them out at once so that they could be noticed on that stand.... I finished the second one, and I was almost finished with the pencils on the third one, when the whole thing ran out of steam because the first one came out and the original plan was to turn out two of them at one time, and a third one the following month, so that they would have a place on the rack. But when they turned out one by itself, nobody knew where to put it, whether it was science fiction, cartoons.... So Dystel said [after the first book's sales figured had come in], 'OK, we'll do it your way. We'll turn out the books in a sequence.'

Kane also partly blamed Tarzan comic strip writer-artist Burne Hogarth, an influential figure in the field, for the series' demise:

Then Burne came up and started to say that the pages were too small. So I get a call from Dystel who says, 'You've got to make fewer pictures on a page so that they're not so small.' ... And they didn't have a trade book size in those days. ... But once the criticism started to come from Burne and everybody else, despite the fact that Oscar Dystel was crazy about it, the fact was that about 60 days later I couldn't get him on the phone and then beyond that it was all a dead issue. And the contract didn't stand because I never could get the books in on time since I was underpaid [for] them anyhow.

The planned sequel eventually premiered in Marvel Preview #17. Cover art by Romas Kukalis.

By this time Kane had already completed The Mind Demons, which eventually premiered — with its contents intact but its panel-layout reconfigured — as the 62-page Marvel Comics magazine Marvel Preview #17 (Winter 1979). In an early use of the term, it was called a graphic novel on the cover.

The first Blackmark book had already been reprinted by then — similarly with its contents intact but its panel-layout reconfigured — in Marvel's black-and-white comics-magazine omnibus The Savage Sword of Conan #1-4 (Aug. 1974 - Feb. 1975), as the 15-page "Blackmark" and the 14-page "Blackmark (Chapter 2)", "The Testing of Blackmark", and "Blackmark Triumphant!" The 2002 reissue did not include the original's one-paragraph biography of Kane.

The 30th-anniversary edition (ISBN 1-56097-456-7) includes both the original book and the 117-page sequel The Mind Demons; an eight-page historical afterword; and the original paperback's double-page frontispiece. It does not include the original final page: a full-body shot of Blackmark with sword, and a Kane floating-head self-portrait and one-paragraph biography / afterword.

Blackmark is unrelated to the music company Black Mark at blackmark.net, or to the fictional insurgent group Blackmark in the TV series Babylon 5.

== Plot ==
Old Earth is dead, devastated by nuclear holocausts. New Earth lives on as a shadow world, inhabited by the vestiges of humanity, divided into tyrannical petty kingdoms, wracked by fear, superstition, barbarism and poverty. Strange, fearsome mutated beasts roam the blasted lands and waters, while any followers of science are hunted. On the cold northern frontiers, a race of malformed men with strange mental powers plots the eventual conquest of the planet from the fortress of Psi-Keep.

Zeph the Tinker travels with his young wife Marnie from Country Clayro through Country McCall and the Demon Waste. While Zeph is hunting game, Marnie is startled by two riders fleeing pursuers. The riders — the dying wizard-king Amarix and his companion Balzamo — make the barren woman a deal to not only transfer the pre-holocaust knowledge in his head to Marnie, but to make it possible for that information to be passed onto her unborn child.

That child, Blackmark, is raised by Zeph and Marnie for years, before their home is attacked by a local warlord and his soldiers, who kills both parents while leaving Blackmark alive as a lesson. The child swears to get revenge by taking over the whole planet. He grows up and eventually becomes a gladiator slave and notorious outlaw. King Kargon, who years earlier had overthrown Amarix, puts Blackmark in his gladiator arena which contains a pre-war rocket in the middle, which Amarix had worked on restoring before his overthrow. Lyllith, the queen, attempts to seduce Blackmark, but he refuses, and in the process of escaping, kills his overseer before being captured and thrown in a dungeon.

In the dungeon, Blackmark meets Balzamo, who has also been held prisoner so Kargon can learn more about old sciences, and the two talk about the power Amarix gave Blackmark. The next day, Blackmark and Balzamo are made to fight in the arena against a mutant "flame lizard". He also recognizes the warlord who killed his parents sitting next to Kargon, but focuses on saving Balzamo by killing the mutant. Victorious, Blackmark demands Kargon give Balzamo his freedom and himself the warlord, but Kargon refuses and orders Blackmark's execution, only hesitating due to the crowd cheering for Blackmark.

Balzamo convinces Blackmark to try and use the rocket to start a revolution, with Blackmark challenging Kargon that he can move it, which Kargon accepts due to the crowd. Blackmark manages to open the rocket and enters, finding controls which he remembers from Amarix's transferred knowledge, and launches the rocket out of the arena. The crowd witnesses this in amazement and declare Blackmark the new king, looking to overthrow Kargon. Meanwhile on the rocket, Blackmark finds an encased sword with a sonic-powered blade. The rocket lands as the people in the arena launch a rebellion, and Kargon retreats to his palace.

Blackmark cuts through Kargon's soldiers, reaching the palace interior and killing the king's personal guard, demanding to know where Lyllith and the warlord are. Kargon does not know, and when asked the warlord's name instead mocks Blackmark's parents, causing Blackmark to kill him. Blackmark finds Lyllith and the warlord surrounded by a crowd while escaping and throws his sword to try and stop the warlord, only to hit Lyllith instead. The warlord escapes, while Balzamo finds Blackmark and tells him to speak to the people shouting his name.

Blackmark speaks before the crowd and swears that he will take over and unify the world. A winged mutant circles overhead and then flies away after Blackmark fires an arrow at it. The creature returns to the Psi-Keep in the North. Meanwhile, Blackmark is hailed as a hero and the new king by the crowd, while Blackmark thinks of his inner desire for vengeance.

== Awards ==
The book won its creator, Gil Kane, a Shazam Award for Special Recognition in 1973 "for Blackmark, his paperback comics novel."

== Critical assessments ==
Associate Professor Rachel Thorn of the School of Cartoon & Comic Art, Kyoto Seika University, in Japan, said of the 1971 paperback: "[I]t's a great read, beautifully illustrated. ... I found the separation of text and images to be no obstacle, and was soon absorbed in the story and art. And speaking of art, this is truly Kane at his finest. Here I think he approaches his own ideal of portraying 'life in motion'. Melodramatic? Cheesy? Maybe. Blackmark is pulp entertainment at its best".

Critic Randy Lander, in a review of the reissue, said Blackmark "started to push the boundaries of what comics could do. The book does not look particularly revolutionary in 2002, but when you consider that it was created over 30 years ago, this illustrated novel that is a mixture of science-fiction and fantasy genres and is unquestionably aimed at an adult audience, starts to look a lot more impressive. ...Goodwin and Kane take a fairly predictable plot and stock characters and make it a fascinating and twisted ride. ... The material sometimes features cheesy dialogue or veers into melodrama, but mostly it holds up remarkably well. It's hard to argue against the merits of Blackmark. It's a piece of comic-book history, a solidly produced book and an example of work from two of the finest creators to grace the medium".

Comics historian R. C. Harvey notes that "several sequences ... gain enormous power from the juxtaposition of pictures and prose." Breaking down a four-page scene in which the mother of a six-year-old Blackmark is raped as the child is forced to look on, Harvey observes that,

Upon first examination, it would appear that the pictures add nothing to the story that is not present in the words. In fact, in some instances, the pictures repeat information given us in the text. That sort of verbal-visual double exposure normally signals inept use of the medium. But a careful reading ... suggests that Kane's visual treatment has contributed a dimension of horror to the incident that is but hinted at in the accompanying words. ... As scripted by Archie Goodwin, the prose is spare, almost flat: It narrates the action in nearly emotionless, descriptive language.... Kane handles the accompanying visuals with similar restraint. [All but one panel] on the first two pages are closeups ... where the emotional consequences of the action are registered. [The mother's] staring but unseeing eyes and her silent scream convey in an instant all the horror, revulsion, and sense of violation that the otherwise restrained sequence only suggests ... [and] derives a good deal of its power from its contrast to the emotionless context in which it appears."
