= Raven (Marvel Comics) =

Fictional character

Raven is a fictional character appearing in American comic books published by Marvel Comics. The character first appeared in Rawhide Kid #35 (August 1963).

== Fictional character biography ==
Thorn Trask, also known as the Raven, is an Old West criminal who fought the Rawhide Kid.
