= His Name Is... Savage =

- His Name Is... Savage #1. Cover art by Robert Foster
- Date: June 1968
- Page count: 40 pages
- Publisher: Adventure House Press (1968); Fantagraphics (1982 reprint)

Creative team
- Creator: Gil Kane; Archie Goodwin

His Name Is... Savage is a 40-page, magazine-format comics novel released in 1968 as a precursor to the modern graphic novel. Created by the veteran American comic book artist Gil Kane, who conceived, plotted and illustrated the project, and writer Archie Goodwin, who scripted under the pseudonym Robert Franklin, the black-and-white magazine was published by Kane's Adventure House Press, and distributed to newsstands.

== Publication history ==
His Name Is... Savage #1 (June 1968), the sole issue published, was the first full-length comics story in a non-comic book format since 1950, when St. John Publications issued the digest-sized hardboiled detective novellas It Rhymes with Lust and The Case of the Winking Buddha. Like them, Savage was also sold on newsstands rather than in book stores. Marvel Comics, shortly after Savage appeared, published the first of a two-issue comics magazine, The Spectacular Spider-Man, starring that titular superhero. Like the similar, anthological comics magazines of the time, such as Creepy, Eerie and Vampirella, both His Name Is... Savage and The Spectacular Spider-Man cost 35¢, whereas a typical comic book cost 12¢ and double-size issues 25¢.

Splash panel. Art by Kane.

Gil Kane in the 1960s was a well-established comic-book artist who had co-created the modern versions of the DC Comics superheroes Green Lantern and the Atom. He was additionally an early and outspoken advocate of creators' rights in an industry that at the time did not offer character ownership or royalties. Circa 1963, Kane set up a studio on East 63rd Street in Manhattan, New York City, New York, and for five years worked sporadically on both His Name Is... Savage and a project that would become the paperback comics novel Blackmark. Kane in 1996 said the actual drawing of Savage "was done, from beginning to end, in 30 days. That last page was inked at the printer while they were getting the book ready".

Kane conceived the character Savage, an espionage agent and troubleshooter, and developed the story and art. He based his protagonist visually on actor Lee Marvin, whom Kane had seen in the movie Point Blank. The resemblance was much more pointed on Robert Foster's photo-referenced painted cover, which was replaced by a new Kane illustration for the 1982 Fantagraphics reprint. Kane said in 1996, "We never had any trouble from Lee Marvin — obviously he never saw the goddamn thing. We never had any trouble from anybody".

During this process, he brought in Archie Goodwin, a writer-editor then at the black-and-white horror-magazine publisher Warren Publishing, to script. Goodwin did so under the pseudonym Robert Franklin; in the 1982 reprint, Gil Kane's Savage, Goodwin, under his own name, is credited alongside Kane for "Story." Larry Koster handled production, with artist Robert Foster contributing a painted cover. Manny Stallman, a comic-book artist and Kane colleague, introduced Kane "to printers and sales representatives, and it was through Manny that I met the people who ultimately allowed me to turn out His Name Is... Savage," Kane said.

Kane entered into an arrangement with the large newsstand-distribution company Kable News, who jointly published the magazine with Kane under Kane's imprint, Adventure House Press, Inc.. Kane said in 1996 that Kable paid the printing and manufacturing costs but no art or editorial fees.

I've forgotten the percentage the publisher took out, but it was something like a 60-40 thing, and they took the larger percentage. ... The chief administrator at Cable [sic] didn't want to give me [distribution], and while he was talking, the head of the company came in, [and] saw the material. I talked to him for about a half-hour. And I walked out of there dazed. We had a reasonable deal, and they did the best they could. They gave us a contract and were going to pay for three books....

The project encountered production difficulties, with Kane having difficulty finding a printer willing to risk alienating the large mainstream comics publishers.

Spartan took us on right away.... The next day they call us us up and say, 'Look, we hear there's a mistake, and that you might be publishing some kind of pornography, and we really don't want to get into problems.' I tried to assure the [company], I showed them some of the stuff! We went to the printer who printed [the satirical, black-and-white comics magazine] Mad, a New York printer — perfect guy to do it. He took us on. ... Called us the next day [to cancel]. ... Finally somebody recommended the [political] magazine Ramparts, and we found out who the printer was. They were on Long Island. I called them, and they didn't give a shit; they would do it. ... We got a very good price from them — a better price than anybody else — and they did it".

Difficulties continued at the distribution level. Adventure House Press printed 200,000 copies, but only approximately one-tenth reached newsstands, per Kane's private estimate. Local distributors, who took magazines on consignment from national distributor Kable, chose for unknown reasons not to carry the magazine, and returned their copies for credit. "We started to get all these boxes of comics back", Kane said. Though planned as a continuing series, with Kane having completed cover art for issues #2-3, only this initial issue was produced.

== Synopsis ==
The sole story, "The Return of the Half-Man", is a science-fiction spy thriller concerning a cyborg renegade retired general, Simon Mace, who kidnaps the U.S. president and impersonates him at a United Nations assembly in an attempt to ignite a world war. The story and art were more graphically violent than comic books and movies of the day, with one panel showing a pulped and bloody crushed hand and another showing a metal gun-barrel smashing through a man's teeth and sending teeth flying.

"Savage depends on only two things: guts and his .357 magnum, which he has no compunction about using," one critic wrote of the 1982 reissue. "Broken noses, splintering teeth, and splattering brains are all depicted in lurid detail. They are part and parcel of Savage's obdurate attempts to stop a madman from instigating World War III. Although this is an old theme, Kane and Goodwin present a tale that is riveting and upsettingly believable."

== Reprint ==
Fantagraphics' 1982 reprint, Gil Kane's Savage! Kane altered the protagonist's features to avoid the original edition's unauthorized use of actor Lee Marvin's likeness.

Fantagraphics Books reprinted His Name Is... Savage in 1982 under the title Gil Kane's Savage, rendered as Gil Kane's Savage! on its cover logo. It had new cover art by Kane to replace the original painted cover.

Other alterations for the 68-page, black-and-white comics magazine, cover-priced $2.50, also included what one critic described as "a more esthetic typeface (to supplant the older, which was shabby, uneven, and contained many typos);a foreword by comics journalist R. C. Harvey; and two ... interviews with Kane (one dealing specifically with Savage, the other concerned primarily with technique)." The latter, conducted by Will Eisner, was reprinted from Kitchen Sink Press' The Spirit #28 (April 1981), originally published as "Shop Talk: Gil Kane".

== Legacy ==
The character returned in a four-page vignette titled "Gil Kane's Savage" in the benefit publication Anything Goes #1 (1986, Fantagraphics Books). Kane also drew the cover, featuring Savage.
