= El Diablo (character) =

Comic character

- El Diablo (Rafael Sandoval) from the cover of El Diablo vol. 2 #16 by Mike Parobeck.

Publication information
- Publisher: DC Comics
- First appearance: (Lazarus Lane); All-Star Western #2 (October 1970) (Rafael Sandoval); El Diablo vol. 2 #1 (August 1989) (Chato Santana); El Diablo vol. 3 #1 (September 2008)
- Created by: (Lazarus Lane); Robert Kanigher (writer); Gray Morrow (artist) (Rafael Sandoval); Gerard Jones (writer); Mike Parobeck (artist) (Chato Santana); Jai Nitz (writer); Phil Hester (artist); Ande Parks (artist)

In-story information
- Alter ego: Lazarus Lane; Rafael Sandoval; Chato Santana
- Team affiliations: (Lazarus Lane); Rough Bunch; Justice Riders (Rafael Sandoval); Justice League (Chato Santana); Suicide Squad; Checkmate
- Abilities: (Rafael Sandoval); Olympic level boxer and athlete (Chato Santana); Pyrokinesis

El Diablo is a name shared by several characters appearing in media published by DC Comics: Lazarus Lane, Rafael Sandoval, and Chato Santana. Santana appears in the 2016 Suicide Squad film, set in the DC Extended Universe.

== Publication history ==
The Lazarus Lane incarnation of El Diablo first appeared in All-Star Western #2 (October 1970), and was created by Robert Kanigher and Gray Morrow. The character starred in a four-issue miniseries published by DC Comics through their Vertigo imprint as a mature readers title; El Diablo #1 (March 2001) was written by Brian Azzarello and drawn by Danijel Zezelj.

The Rafael Sandoval incarnation of El Diablo first appeared in El Diablo #1 (August 1989), and was created by Gerard Jones and Mike Parobeck.

The Chato Santana incarnation of El Diablo first appeared in El Diablo #1 (September 2008) and was created by Jai Nitz, Phil Hester and Ande Parks.

== Fictional character biography ==
=== Lazarus Lane ===
Lazarus Lane is the original iteration of El Diablo, operating in the later half of the 19th century in the American Old West. Lane was originally a bank teller who is nearly killed by a gang of thieves and put in a coma after being struck by lightning. After being revived by Native American shaman "Wise Owl", Lane becomes the vigilante El Diablo. The name "El Diablo" means "the devil" in Spanish.

According to Jonah Hex vol. 2 #11 (November 2006) and #24 (December 2007), Lazarus Lane is cursed to be the host of a minor demon which acts as a Spirit of Vengeance. Lane's body slumbers in a coma while "El Diablo" roams the Earth. His fate is similar to that of the current Crimson Avenger. In Swamp Thing vol. 2 #85 (April 1989), Wise Owl is shown in a more villainous light, with Lane/El Diablo his unwilling servant. In that story, set in 1872, a number of DC's western heroes (including the aforementioned Hex, Bat Lash, Johnny Thunder (John Tane), and Madame .44) were employed by Otto Von Hammer and Jason Blood to defeat Wise Owl and recover from him an object of great power, which turned out to be a crystal containing the spirit of Swamp Thing, who had become lost in time. When the group killed Wise Owl, Lane's comatose body woke up, and El Diablo apparently vanished forever.

In The New 52 (a 2011 reboot of the DC Comics universe), Lazarus Lane appeared in a backup feature in All-Star Western. In this iteration, he was once again cursed by Wise Owl to become the host of a demon. Rather than being in a coma, Lazarus remains awake. However, El Diablo arises from his body whenever he is unconscious.

=== Rafael Sandoval ===
The concept for the character was initiated by editor Brian Augustyn, who wanted to come up with a new angle on the name El Diablo. He stated, "Forget the old west setting and the paralysis gimmick of the old El Diablo, make up a new character in the new west a city in Texas, and play off the Spanish name by making him Mexican American. He'll be a councilman, because all of his Anglo cohorts treat him like just a token Hispanic, So he decides what he can do for the underdogs of the city in his own time, under an assumed name, and a mask".

Rafael Sandoval was the second iteration created in 1989 by writer Gerard Jones and artist Mike Parobeck as a title set in the modern DC Universe. This title lasted 16 months. As created by Jones and Parobeck, Sandoval is a rookie member of the city council of Dos Rios, Texas, who creates his version of El Diablo (from a festival costume and an old boxing persona and local legends surrounding the Devil) after being stymied by officials while trying to pursue the case of a serial arsonist. Subsequent efforts involved battles with illicit drug smugglers using maquiladora covers for their activities, a hunt for a serial killer, conflicts with human-smuggling operations, and Sandoval's conscience over how to serve the people of Dos Rios.

Rafael Sandoval's character has subsequently made guest appearances in one of the Justice League titles, in which he is possessed by the spirit of an Aztec god-emperor and takes on an appearance reminiscent of Lazarus Lane. He also appears in the Villains United Special when he is pulled out of retirement by Oracle to serve in her de facto Justice League, whereupon he is attacked by a member of the Royal Flush Gang during a battle at the Enclave M prison in the Sonora Valley, Mexico. He is wounded in the battle, but rescued by the warden of the facility.

=== Chato Santana ===
The current iteration of El Diablo is Chato Santana, an ex-criminal who after being hospitalized, meets a still living comatose Lazarus Lane. It is written by Jai Nitz, pencilled by Phil Hester, with inks by Ande Parks.

In The New 52 reboot of DC's continuity, Santana's El Diablo is a member of the Suicide Squad. He joins Checkmate under the leadership of Uncle Sam, until he realizes that he is being lied to and abandons them in search of the truth.

== In other media ==
=== Television ===
- The Lazarus Lane incarnation of El Diablo appears in the Justice League Unlimited episode "The Once and Future Thing Part One: Weird Western Tales", voiced by Néstor Carbonell.
- The Chato Santana incarnation of El Diablo appears in the Teen Titans Go! episode "TV Knight 2". This version's design is based on the DCEU incarnation (see below).

=== Film ===
Chato Santana / El Diablo as he appears in Suicide Squad.

The Chato Santana incarnation of El Diablo appears in Suicide Squad, portrayed by Jay Hernandez. This version was previously a gang leader before accidentally destroying his family home in a moment of anger, killing his wife and two children in the process. Guilt-ridden, he is incarcerated in Belle Reve Penitentiary and vows to never use his powers again. Despite being forced into Amanda Waller's Task Force X program, Diablo maintains his vow until Deadshot goads him into helping defend the squad from the Enchantress' forces. El Diablo later helps his squad-mates resist the Enchantress' illusions before sacrificing himself to kill her brother Incubus.

=== Video games ===
- The Chato Santana incarnation of El Diablo appears in Lego Batman 3: Beyond Gotham via "The Squad" DLC.
- The Chato Santana incarnation of El Diablo appears as a playable character in Suicide Squad: Special Ops.

=== Miscellaneous ===
The Chato Santana incarnation of El Diablo makes cameo appearances in DC Super Hero Girls as a student of Super Hero High.
