= Trigger Twins =

The Trigger Twins are the names of two sets of fictional Western themed characters appearing in American comic books published by DC Comics.

== Fictional character biography ==
=== Walter and Wayne Trigger ===
Trigger Twins

Publication information
- Publisher: DC Comics
- First appearance: All-Star Western #58 (May 1951)
- Created by: Robert Kanigher (writer); Carmine Infantino (artist)

In-story information
- Alter ego: Walter and Wayne Trigger
- Team affiliations: Justice Riders
- Abilities: Excellent marksmen and hand-to-hand combatants

The Trigger Twins first appear in All-Star Western #58 (May 1951), the first issue of that title under its new name (previously known as All Star Comics), and was one of the features that replaced the previous stars, the Justice Society of America. The series was created by Robert Kanigher and Carmine Infantino.

The series feature the adventures of a pair of twin brothers, Walt and Wayne Trigger. Walt is a sheriff, while Wayne is a civilian, but is more accurate and faster on the draw with firearms than his brother. Wayne impersonates Walt on various adventures as needed, through secretly wearing identical clothes and using a twin of Walt's horse, so that no one suspects that Wayne was covering for Walt.

The series ran through All Star Western #116 (1961) after which they were replaced by another feature, and were unseen until Showcase #72 (February 1968) when a story was reprinted under the banner, "Top Gun", a oneshot filler issue. In 1973 they were given a short-lived title. The Twins appeared in All-Star Squadron during Crisis on Infinite Earths, at which point it is revealed they reside on Earth-Two.

=== Tom and Tad Trigger ===
Trigger Twins

Publication information
- Publisher: DC Comics
- First appearance: Detective Comics #667 (October 1993)
- Created by: Chuck Dixon (writer); Graham Nolan (artist)

In-story information
- Alter ego: Tom and Tad Trigger
- Team affiliations: The Society; Black Lantern Corps

A modern pair of Trigger Twins are introduced in Detective Comics #667 (October 1993). They are Tom and Tad Trigger, a pair of criminals who resemble their Old West counterparts, although it is unknown if they are actually related. They first meet when they both decide, separately, to rob the same bank at the same time. Though shocked and confused at seeing how they look alike, they decide to work together in finishing the robbery and escaping.

During the Infinite Crisis storyline, the twins join the Secret Society of Super Villains. As part of an army, they are sent to destroy the city of Metropolis. During the Battle of Metropolis, the twins are shot and killed by a group of vigilantes that includes Vigilante and Wild Dog.

During the Blackest Night crossover, the Trigger Twins are among the many deceased villains who receive a black power ring, reanimating them as members of the Black Lantern Corps.

== Other versions ==
Alternate universe variants of the Trigger Twins from Earth-18 appear in The Multiversity as members of the Justice Riders.

== In other media ==
In the Arrowverse crossover "Elseworlds", John Deegan rewrites reality, turning Barry Allen and Oliver Queen into the Trigger Twins before they eventually defeat Deegan and restore reality.
