= Károlyfalva =

Coordinates: 48°22′02″N 21°35′07″E

Károlyfalva Karlsdorf (German)
- Former municipality
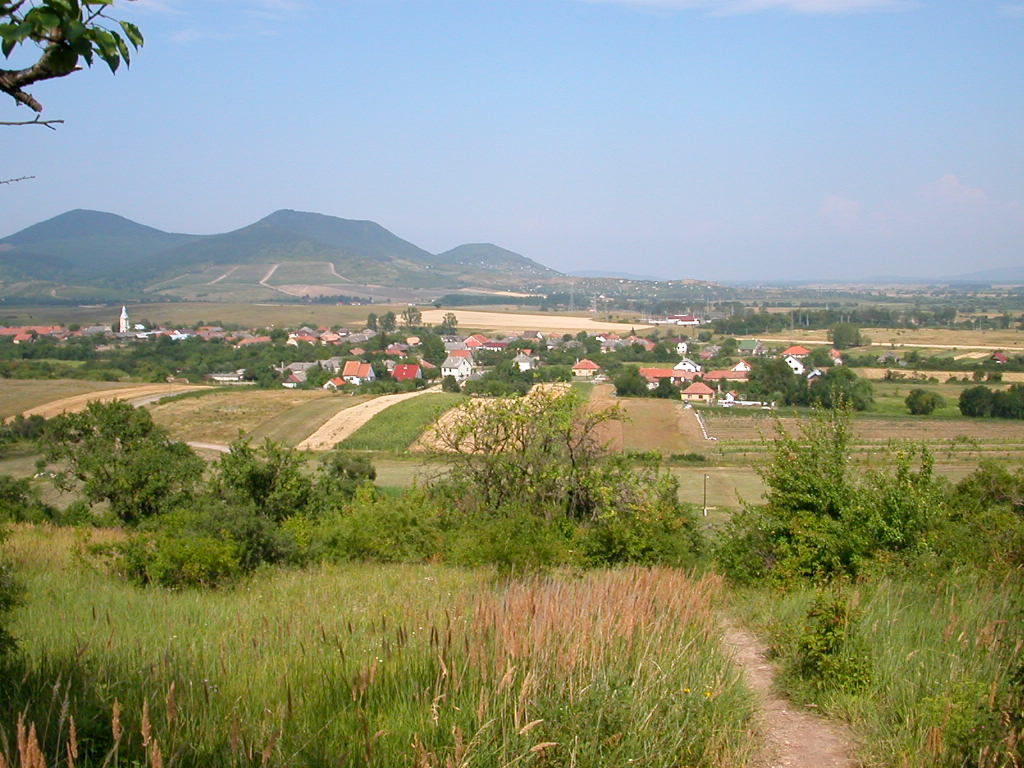
- View of the village

- Coat of arms

- Location within Hungary
- Country: Hungary
- Regions: Northern Hungary
- County: Borsod-Abaúj-Zemplén County
- District: Sátoraljaújhely District

Population (2022)
  - Total: 307
- Time zone: UTC+1 (CET)
  - Summer (DST): UTC+2 (CEST)
- Postal code: 3944
- Area code: (+36) 47

Károlyfalva (German: Karlsdorf) was a village in Borsod-Abaúj-Zemplén County, northern Hungary. It is part of the town of Sátoraljaújhely since 1985.

== Geography ==
It lies at the southeastern foot of the Zemplén Mountains, near Main road 37, along Road 3718, between Sárospatak and Sátoraljaújhely, 6.3 kilometers southwest of the center of Sátoraljaújhely.

The neighboring settlements are: Kácsárd to the north, Sátoraljaújhely to the east, Sárospatak to the south and the west.

== History ==
In the first half of the 1700s, the son of John Leopold Trautson seeing the severe depopulation and the lack of labour, settled Swabians in the area from his estates in Germany. The settlers established three villages in the area: Rátka (Ratkau), Hercegkút (Trautsondorf), and Károlyfalva (Karlsdorf).

The independent municipality council dissolved in 1985, and the village became part of the town of Sátoraljaújhely.

== Gallery ==
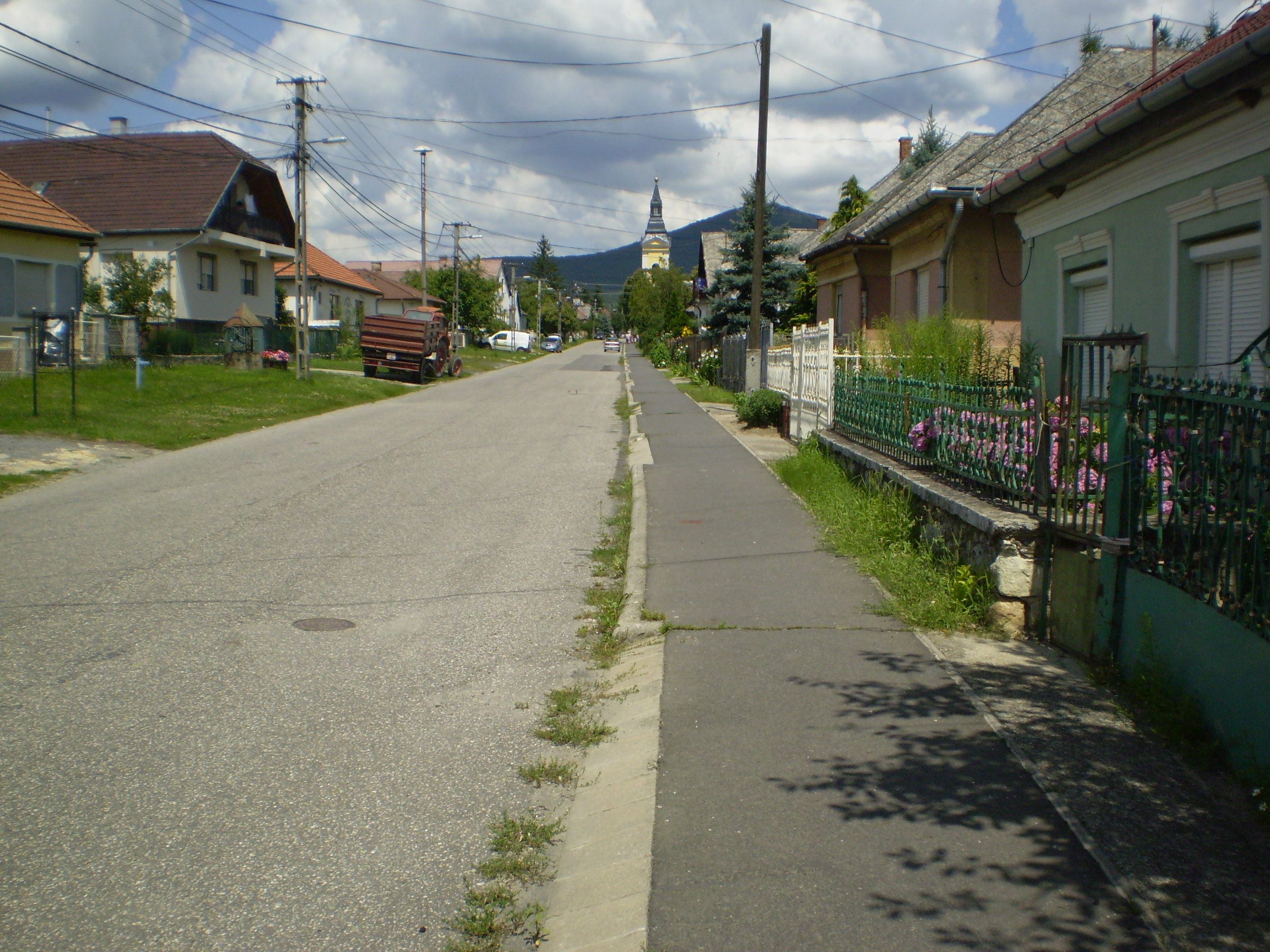
Main street

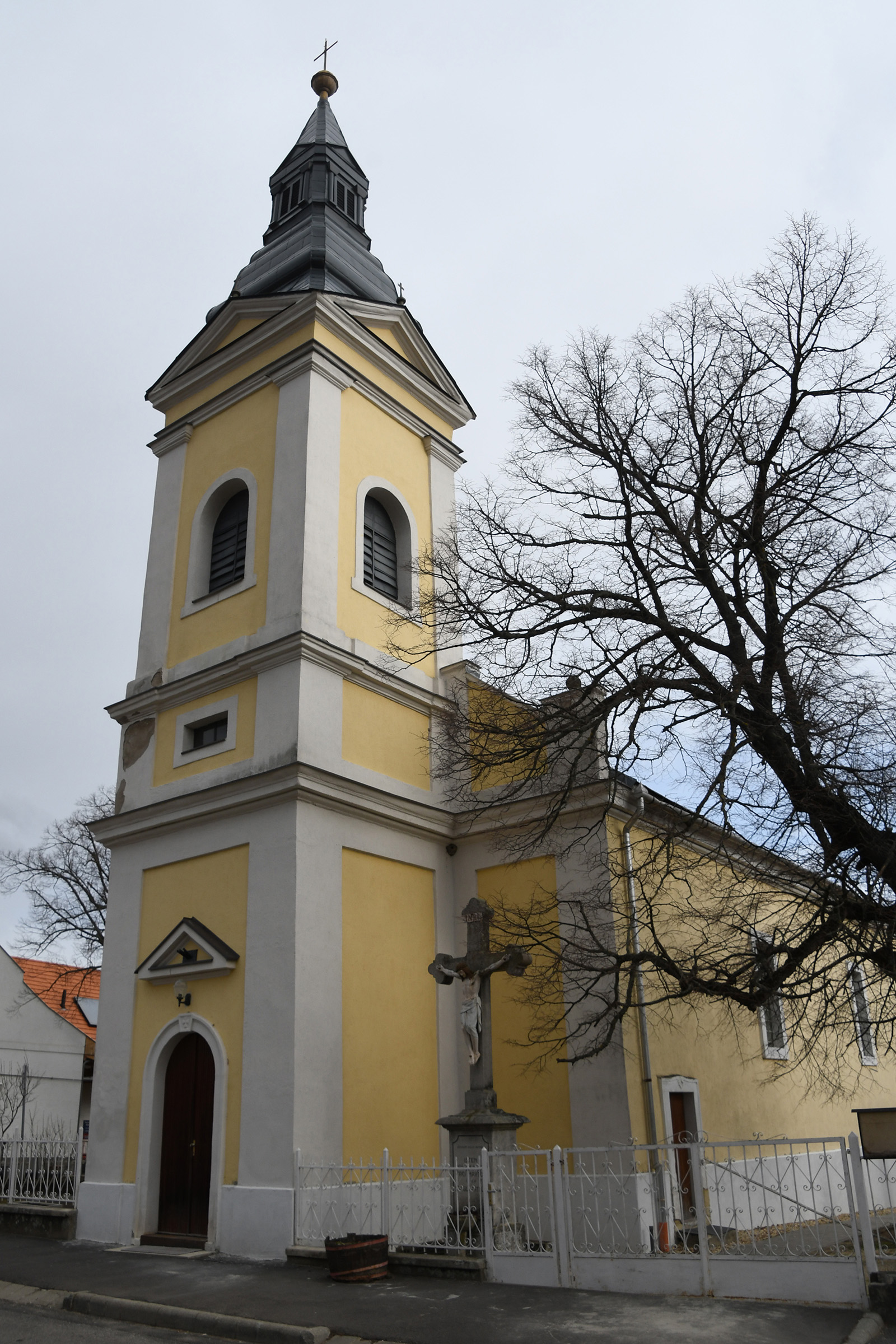
Roman Catholic church

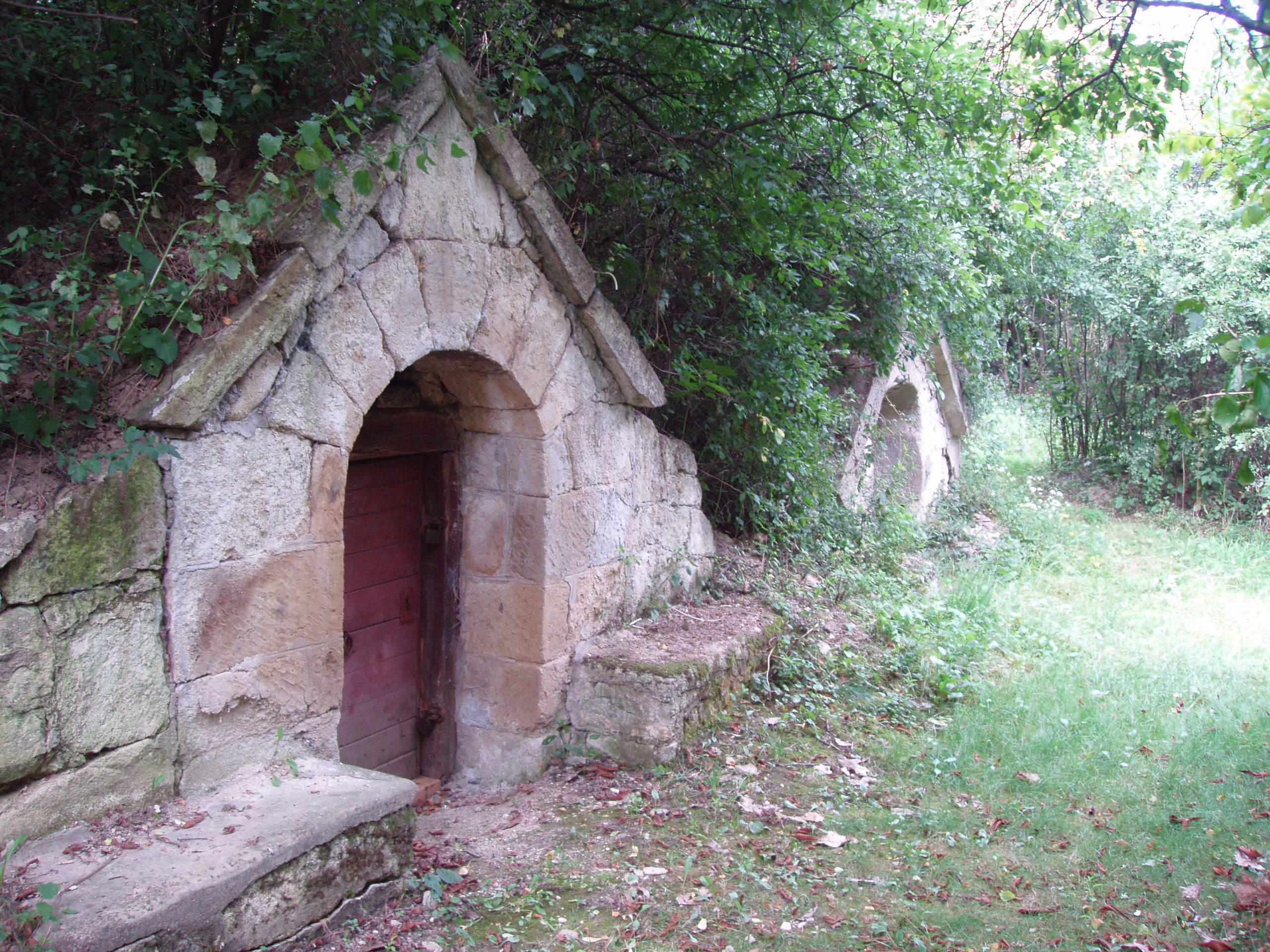
Cellars

World War II Memorial

Bust of Saint John of Nepomuk
