= Bodroghalász =

- Former municipality
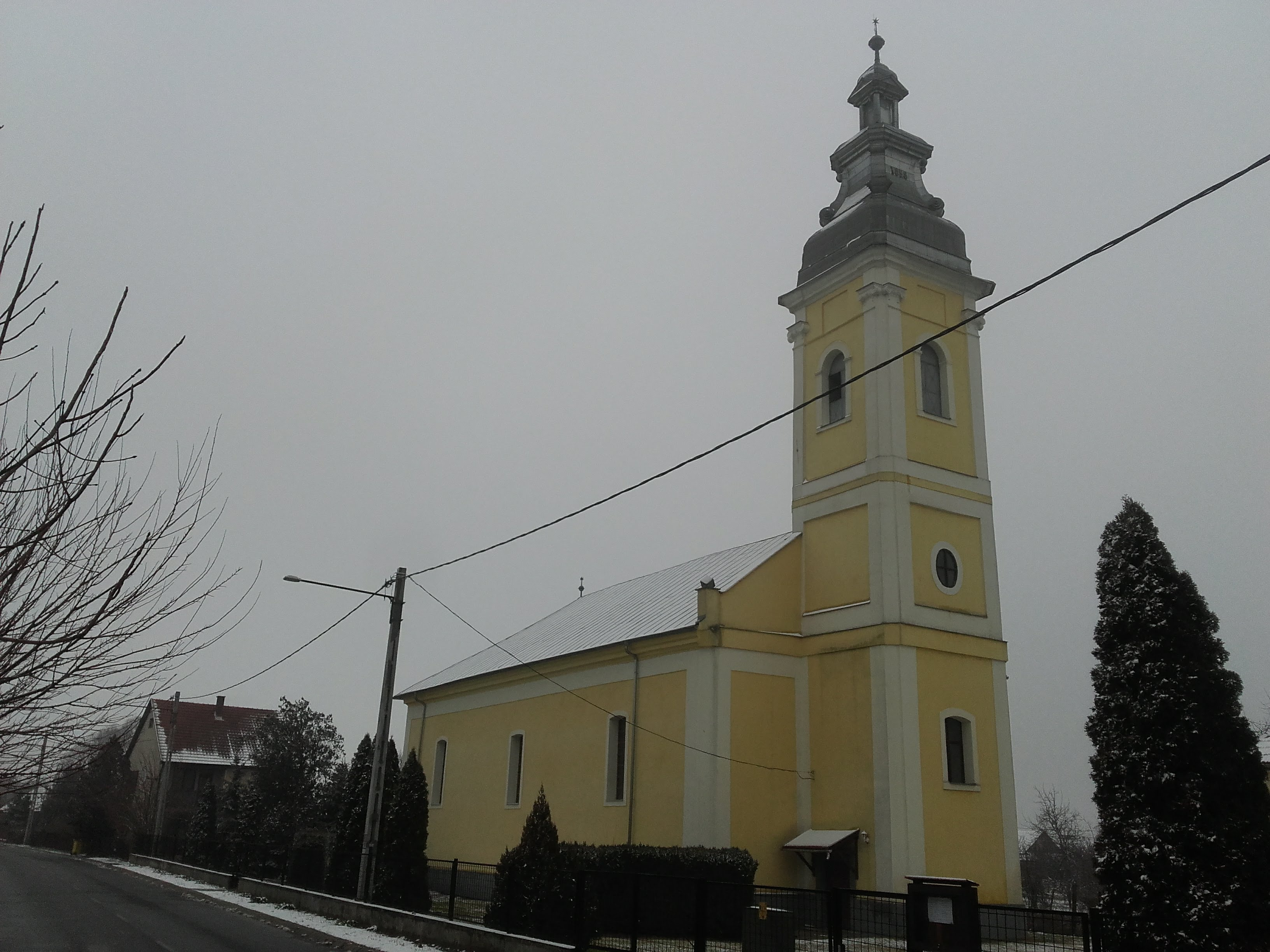
- Reformed Church

- Location within Hungary
- Coordinates: 48°19′8.29″N 21°33′58.9″E
- Country: Hungary
- Regions: Northern Hungary
- County: Borsod-Abaúj-Zemplén County
- District: Sárospatak District
- Time zone: UTC+1 (CET)
  - Summer (DST): UTC+2 (CEST)

Bodroghalász, formerly Petrahó was a village in Borsod-Abaúj-Zemplén County in northeastern Hungary. In 1950, it became part of the town of Sárospatak.

== Geography ==
It lies on the bank of the Bodrog, along Road 3801, southwest of the downtown of Sárospatak.

== History ==
It was first mentioned in 1248 under the name Petrahó; after the Mongol invasion, it was settled by Italians. In 1896, the name of the village was Hungarianized to Bodroghalász.

Its Reformed church was built between 1823 and 1826 in late Baroque style.
