= Johnny Thunder (John Tane) =

Publication information
- Publisher: DC Comics
- First appearance: All-American Comics #100 (August 1948)
- Created by: Alex Toth; Robert Kanigher

In-story information
- Alter ego: John Tane
- Team affiliations: Rough Bunch; Justice Riders
- Partnerships: Hank Brown
- Abilities: Skilled detective, forensic specialist, bush tracker, expert marksman

Johnny Thunder (John Tane) is a fictional Western character from DC Comics. He first appeared in All-American Comics #100 in 1948.

== Publication history ==
The character was debuted in All-American Comics in issue #100 in 1948 by Alex Toth and Robert Kanigher. The series would then be renamed All-American Western and feature Johnny Thunder on the covers of the comic book series.

== Fictional character biography ==
John Stuart Mill Tane lived in the Mormon settlement of Mesa City, Arizona. The son of a sheriff and a schoolteacher, Johnny's mother makes him promise never to use guns and to instead follow in her footsteps. Johnny became a schoolteacher, but he soon found himself in a situation where violence was required. In order to keep his vow, Johnny created the identity of Johnny Thunder by changing clothes and darkening his hair to black.

Johnny Thunder would go on to be a member of the group the Rough Bunch.

In Impulse Annual #2 (1997), a backup story revealed that Johnny Tane was inspired to create a secret identity by Max Mercury. As revealed in DC Comics Presents #28 (1980), Johnny eventually retired from action, marrying the similarly-retired outlaw Madame .44 (Jeanne Walker). Johnny and Jeanne have a daughter, Rebecca, and a son, Chuck. This was an intentional nod by writer Mike Tiefenbacher to the character Chuck Taine (Bouncing Boy), though the characters are not related in-universe.
