= Doctor Fate (disambiguation) =

Doctor Fate is a superhero appearing in American comic books published by DC Comics.

Doctor Fate or Fate may also refer to:

== Characters ==
- Doctor Fate (Kent Nelson)
- Doctor Fate (Kent V. Nelson)
- Doctor Fate (Khalid Nassour)
- Hector Hall
- Alternative versions of Doctor Fate

== Print media ==
- Doctor Fate (comic book): various comic books focusing on incarnations of Doctor Fate
