= Arion (character) =

DC Comics sword and sorcery character

- Arion, Lord of Atlantis. Art by Scott Kolins.

Publication information
- Publisher: DC Comics
- First appearance: Warlord #55 (March 1982)
- Created by: Paul Kupperberg; Jan Duursema

In-story information
- Alter ego: Ahri'ahn
- Species: Deity (demigod, cosmic being, demon)
- Place of origin: Ancient Atlantis
- Team affiliations: Lords of Order; Justice League; Atlantean Pantheon; Justice League Blue
- Partnerships: Wyynde; Lady Chian; Aquaman`
- Supporting character of: Aquaman; Power Girl
- Notable aliases: Arion, Lord of Atlantis; Arion the Immortal; Sorcerer Supreme; Sorcerer Supreme of Atlantis; Son of Order; God-King of Atlantis; Aristotle Ronalds; Vicomte Jean-Simon Giscard D'Arion
- Abilities: Nearly limitless magical power and mastery in Atlantean-based magic; Genius-level intellect; gifted scientist, explorer, and engineer.; Expert hand-to-hand combatant and skilled swordsman

Altered in-story information for adaptations to other media
- Alter ego: Orm Marius

Arion, also referred to as Arion, Lord of Atlantis, Arion the Immortal, is a sword and sorcery superhero and antihero appearing in American comic books published by DC Comics. He debuted in Warlord #55 (March 1982), created by Paul Kupperberg and Jan Duursema. The character is commonly associated within Aquaman and Power Girl, his stories and history having retroactively been connected to the former's version of Atlantis.

An immortal wizard and demigod from ancient Atlantis, Ahri'ahn served as its ancient protector, the era's Sorcerer Supreme, and a ranked member among the Lords of Order. Unlike conventional DC Lords, Arion is one of the few (alongside Amethyst) to possess a natural human form. The character's magical exploits, scientific discoveries and heroism in the fictional mythology of Atlantis makes him a revered figure and the cultural progenitor of the Homo magi race and their descendants. Surviving into the modern day, he is the ancestor of several notable heroes and villains such as Zatanna, Aquaman, and Ocean Master. The character was also once retroactively a relative to Power Girl, until this change was later also reversed, and has acted as both a hero and villain.

Arion appears in Young Justice, voiced by David Kaye.

== Creation ==
In 1978, while working for Charlton Comics, Paul Kupperberg created a proposal for an ongoing series entitled Atlantis, based on Plato's metaphorical concept of Atlantis. Kupperberg stated, "I really tried to make my version of Atlantis as close to his idea as I could, although I changed plenty." When developing the plot of the series Kupperberg drew inspiration from Larry Niven's The Magic Goes Away, stating "When I steal I steal from the best." This proposal laid dormant until editor Laurie Sutton was looking for a new backup feature for Warlord. Once artist Jan Duursema got involved she suggested changing the hero's name of Tynan to Arion, with Paul Kupperburg commenting that "Tynan sucked! it was always intended to be a placeholder name"

== Publication history ==
Cover of Arion, Lord of Atlantis #1 (November 1982). Art by Jan Duursema.

Arion began as a back-up feature in the DC Comics book Warlord with issue #55, in which ran until issue #62 when Arion gained his own series, Arion Lord of Atlantis, beginning with #1 (November 1982). The series lasted for 35 issues plus a special which wrapped up the original storyline, running from November 1982 to September 1985 with the special shipping in November 1985. Concurrently between April 1985 - March 1986, Arion was one of the many characters involved in the Crisis on Infinite Earths crossover title, with his history of Atlantis inserted into the main DC continuity. Arion also appeared in DC Comics Presents in a crossover with Superman.

Years later in 1991, Kupperburg sent in a proposal for what would eventually be Arion the IMMORTAL, a sequel to his original series. Originally titled Arion: Darkworld and Arion, Lord of Order, due to elements similar to characters presented in Doctor Fate and Sandman titles, the draft was reworked as to make the characters involved in the book independent of the Lords of Chaos and Order and the concept of Arion's magic different from the framework established in these other two DC Comic titles, as to not interfere with their direction and depiction. In 1992, Arion starred in a miniseries that established him in the modern era and he would also make appearances in several Aquaman, Wonder Woman and Justice League crossovers.

=== Modern stories ===
During the early 2000s, despite the efforts to ensure the characters and concepts in the series were dissimilar to both titles, many references books and encyclopedias later connected Arion's character, supporting cast, and villains to the same Lords of Chaos and Order characters referenced in other titles. Arion's character would play a role in the JSA title, where the character is involved in a conflict connected to the other characters involved in Lords of Order and Chaos and is killed off in the fiftieth issue of the series. Despite the character's death, a past version of the character hailing from the 1600s would appear in 2006 in the "Camelot Falls" storyline in the Superman title and is depicted as an antagonist to the story. Concurrently, a new incarnation of Arion appeared whose real name was William Knightly.

==== New 52 & Rebirth-onward ====
Eventually, a new version of the character was introduced in the Secret Six 2014 run by Gail Simone; while making a silhouetted appearance, the character's children, Uvian and his unnamed sons, formed a cult known as the Children of Arion and appeared in one of the main antagonists in the Gauntlet storyline in the series. The character would eventually make a full appearance in the Blue Beetle series, acting as the main antagonist. The book connects Blue Beetle's mythos with other magical characters and concepts such as Arion and implies his scarab Khaji Da to be magical in nature.

== Fictional character biography ==
=== Origin ===
In Arion's original origin told to him by Calculha, Arion was a cosmic being born from energies coalesced into form. Because of his standing as a cosmic being, he is capable of affecting the balance between both order and chaos and because of that, is chosen as an unwitting agent. He is found by his aged mentor and Sorcerer Supreme, Calculha, and is tutored in the art of magic and spell-casting. Through their training, they form a familial bond.

In his revised origin, elements from the former remain with some changes; Arion (referred to then as Ahri'ahn) is the son of deities Calculha and Majistra, the former Sorcerer Supreme and the latter his equal with a connection to Egyptians as well as the younger twin brother of Garn Daanuth. Due to the couple's differences in alignment from embodying light and darkness respectively, the pair separate and the two brothers are unaware of their connection until later in life. A prophesized hero, Calculha trained Ahri'ahn in white magic in preparation for his destiny. When near of age, he meets Majistra and Garn during a conclave with other wizards and the family later battles for supremacy when Majistra plots to empower herself with the Zodiac Crystals, artifacts of great magical power, to usher in an age of dark magic. While she manages to gain the upper hand with Calculha, Arion's intervention and sacrifice of usurping control of the crystals displaced her, mystically seared Garn's skin, granting him an albino-esque appearance, and also displaces Calculha when he tries to save his son from magically disintegrating. He sets his converted body into a star and his soul to the Darkworld dimension to be recalled at a later time although the family feud tiled the Earth's axis slightly, inadvertently causing an Ice Age. Ahri'ahn's soul is later recalled thanks to blinded warrior Wyynde's 10,000 years later after guided by Calculha's spirit, christened "Arion", a corruption of his name. He is taken to Atlantis and is made Lord High Mage for the King of Atlantis, D'Tilluh. Eventually, he is re-taught magic he had forgotten by Calculha and becomes one of Atlantis's foremost protectors, aided by Wyynde, Atlantean lieutenant guardsman, and Lady Chian, Captain of D'Tilluh's royal guard and lover.

Later additions to his origin expand on the time in which his soul existed in a state of intangibility in Darkworld as he was raised by sorceress Jheryl and befriended the imp Ghy. Also teaching him magic, she created the red gemstone he uses and serves as his motherly figure in place of Majistra. When called back to the land of the living by his father, the sudden departure from one realm to another blocked his memory of his time in the Darkworld. Owing to its unique regard to time, only twenty years passed in the realm while 100,000 years passed on Earth.

==== Arion, Lord of Atlantis (1982–1985) ====
Throughout his life as Lord High Mage, Arion would have many adventures; he would encounter and be pitted against various gods of the Atlantean pantheon, ended the Ice Age at the cost of his own magical power, and sought ways to reclaim his former might. He would also encounter Garn and learn of their true connections as well as gain a new ally: Mara. Eventually, Arion defeated Garn by sealing him away in Darkworld. Arion would also reclaim his magical power when he was lured into Darkworld by his mother in a plot to gain more power through a connection to Darkworld like its respective denizens. With his soul re-worked by the deity known only as the Weaver, Arion gains his former might but is unable to stop the destruction of Atlantis when Chaon, one of the Atlantean dark gods, led an alien race (later revealed to be descendants of Atlanteans that ventured into space) against Atlantis and sunk it himself. With the empire fractured, the remaining Atlanteans venture to other corners of the globe to rebuild.

==== Crisis on Infinite Earths ====
Arion would appear in the Crisis on Infinite Earth crossover as being among the heroes taken in by Harbinger and aids the heroes.

=== Post-Crisis ===
Owing to the events of Crisis on Infinite Earths, Arion's universe now exists in the same DC Multiverse with a few changes; Arion's version of Atlantis took place in the distant past, roughly around 500,000 years before the main DCU timeline and is explained that despite Arion's belief, Atlantis as a whole was not destroyed. He was also made part of Power Girl's backstory, being his great-granddaughter jettisoned into the future, her powers said to originate from Arion's experimentation in genetic manipulation and an ancestor of Zatanna Zatara through her mother's side. Eventually, Arion and characters from within his series would be connected to DC's homo magi and the Lords of Chaos and Order, the aforementioned sorcerer being among the Lords of Order. Affiliated characters, like his father and mother, would also be retconned into being deities themselves, making him an actual being of divine origin. Later, an aged Arion is revealed to be immortal and to have lost his magic and is living in Greenwich Village along with several former Atlantean gods and goddesses, including Chaon, Deedra, Gemimn, and the Weaver. His companion, Mara, was trapped in canine form when the magic was lost. Arion renews his old rivalry with his brother, Garn Daanuth, and works to stop the return of Atlantean magic by preventing Darkworld, revealed to be a sentient being, from slumbering.

In the Time Masters mini-series, Rip Hunter and his allies travel back in time to Atlantis where Arion assists them while trying to convince Hunter to not use violence.

After Zero Hour: Crisis in Time!, Arion aided the Justice League of America against Scarabus. He eventually turned up in the present day, where his body was taken over by Mordru and his spirit imprisoned in Gemworld. His spirit was finally released and allowed to go to the afterlife by Power Girl and Hawkgirl (along with a recently awakened Dove) to weaken Mordru. Before his soul departed, Arion revealed to Power Girl that she was not his granddaughter and thus not an Atlantean.

Arion seemingly reappeared in Infinite Crisis as one of the mystics gathered in Atlantis to keep the Spectre at bay, and later in the Day of Vengeance tie-in special as one of several magical beings summoned to rebuild the Rock of Eternity. It was later revealed that this Arion was an imposter named Bill Knightley who used Arion's reputation to bolster his own.

In the "Camelot Falls" Superman storyline, a past and depowered version of Arion appears from 1659 after learning of a cataclysmic future centered around the presence of Superman. Using vestiges of magical power from artifacts collected over the millennia, he time travels to the modern era and reveals to Superman and his friends his vision, believing that alien interference has a hand in creating apocalyptic situations for humanity in the long-term, and tells him to quit. When he refuses despite escalating present situations supporting his point, he actively opposes Superman and nearly discredits him. He also kidnaps a "pretender" to his name, William Knightley, to understand his fate in the modern era. He battles Superman once more, who eventually prevails due to Phantom Stranger's protections but manages to slip back to his proper time by using Knightley as a decoy due to long-lasting disguise spells and Knightley possessing mystical powers.

=== The New 52 onward (2011 - current) ===
Although he did not make a full appearance, Arion would make a brief cameo and was mentioned in the 2014 Secret Six relaunch; it is revealed that millions of years ago, he was the wizard responsible for sealing away elder gods known as the "Dark Giants", who appear to be both based on and a reference to Cthulhu Mythos deities and are the central antagonists that threaten the world in the modern-day from being released due to Black Alice's condition of siphoning magic around the world, undoing the very seals that kept them in place. His children are also the antagonist as they work to help undo the seal, having formed a cult named the "Children of Arion". The four members remain nameless save seemingly the leader, Uvian.

Following the company-wide rebranding in DC Rebirth, Arion is reintroduced in Blue Beetle. In this continuity, he shares similarities to his previous version such as being a former king of Atlantis and is stated to be a Lord of Order manifested in the physical form of an Atlantean demigod. He is also indirectly mentioned alongside his brother by the newer version of Calculha and Dark Majistra, this revised history making him an ancestor of Aquaman, Ocean Master, Atlan, and Atlanna. In the "Hard Choices" storyline, a villainous version of Arion appears. Thousands of years ago, Arion was believed to have been turned into an insane villain from exposure to the Blue Beetle scarab and gains a more demonic appearance from the usage of more malevolent magic. After being sealed away by Doctor Fate long ago, he uses his apprentice Mordecai Cull to lure Doctor Fate. Jaime Reyes, and the Blue Beetle scarab into undoing his sealing, stealing the scarab for himself to use its power to destroy the world. With the help of Doctor Fate and his allies, Jaime Reyes manages to defeat the sorcerer and his Atlantean demons created by his magic. Arion is then sealed in a crystal of absolution by Doctor Fate for 10,000 years.

In the "Drowned Earth" crossover storyline, Arion is mentioned in passing and appears in flashbacks, revealing Atlantis and Themyscira once held an alliance as they once sought space exploration, with his close confidante being Asteria, a past Amazon champion, and Arion being one of the few men respected in Amazon history. In his youth, he was also protege to Poseidon and learned the existence of the Life Force through him. Eager to share and unaware of Poseidon's envious and selfish nature, he believes Poseidon's lies when he frames the sea gods who claimed interest in the Life Force as conquerors, a guilt-ridden Arion instead using his magic and technology to invert the Life Force into Death Force, creating the Tear of Extinction and banishing them to the Graveyard of Gods, an afterlife for dead gods, at the cost of his sanity. and seemingly life. This incident, according to a guilt-ridden Poseidon much latter, inspired isolationist foreign policies despite Arion's policies promoting the opposite while making enemies out of the alien gods (known as the Triumvirate of Sea Gods or Ocean Lords), whom were innocent and later attacked Earth thousands of years later while bearing a grudge against Atlantis. However, Queen Mera, the ruling monarch of Atlantis, would fulfill Arion's intents by using the Clarion to broadcast her intentions of connecting her kingdom with interested, oceanic alien worlds.

Both the Hardline Choices and Drowned Earth storylines conflicted in some accounts, with the former suggesting that Arion he became insane due to Khaji Da while the latter through the use of the Tear of Extinction led to his death, with a skeleton displaced. This discrepancy is addressed in the 2021 edition of the DC Comics Encyclopedia, explaining that he was driven insane due to the Tear of Extinction but disappeared, with Atlantean authorities obfuscated details of his fall by claiming he perished. The entry still implied the former storyline still took place alongside the previous Camelot Falls.

In the 2018 Justice League backup issues of Justice League Dark, the famous sorcerer of Arthurian legends, Merlin, plots to conquer all of the magic under his control. His quest pits him against Justice League Dark, Aquaman, and Atlantis's Silent School. Wanting to control the extra-dimensional wellspring of Atlantean magic known as Darkworld without doing so personally, he uses his magical knowledge to resurrect Arion, who has a natural connection to Darkworld and puts him under mind control as one of his Sapphire Knights and is prophesized to destroy Doctor Fate's Tower of Fate.

Arion makes a major appearance in the 2025 Aquaman series, having since found himself in the extradimensional realm of the "Blue", an oceanic counterpart of Swamp Thing's "Green". Imprisoned by its new malevolent ruler, Dagon, and made to nourish oceanic life through his blood in place of water. Aquaman happens upon him and re-introduces himself, having met him previously during the 80th Anniversary issue. Using his new hydrokinetic powers, Aquaman frees him and Vivienne, confirming a prophecy Arion once foretold of an eventual new Avatar of the Blue. With her assistance, Arion helps forge Aquaman a new weapon and works to unseat Dagon with newfound allies as Aquaman searches for the displaced Atlantis. Eventually, he witnesses Aquaman become the new Avatar and defeat Dagon, freeing the Blue from his malignant influence.

== Characterization ==
=== Description ===
In his original debut, Arion was first defined as a cosmic being. His ongoing series, however, retroactively cast him as a bircaial demigod whose parents are both gods; while his father hails from an extradimensional realm, his mother originates from Earth with undefined connections although her dark-skinned appearance and rulership over Mu, featuring architecture based upon depictions of Egypt, hints a pre-history connection to Egyptians. Both aspects were eventually merged, making him a Lord of Order of divine heritage with a natural human form. He is also a distant ancestor of Zatanna from Sindella's line and ancestor to the royal Atlantean line, including Aquaman, Ocean Master, Atlan, Atlanna, and Andrina Curry. In modern settings, he is a ally to Aquaman in mystical matters.

Arion was first characterized as the "Lord High Mage" during the times of ancient Atlantis, a senior government post held by sorcerers that makes him a designated expert in the mystic matters and grants leadership only surpassed by the monarch and their aide. He is also portrayed as a revered, influential figure and monarch of Atlantis, his fame similar to King Arthur to nations above Atlantis. The character has described as a powerful sorcerer whose heritage and centuries of study makes among the most powerful in any era, which makes him arrogant. He has also been referred to as the Sorcerer Supreme of Atlantis.

=== Powers and abilities ===
Afforded powerful magical abilities and immortality due to his heritage, Arion is considered both an "archmage" and "sorcerer", allowing for abilities originating from enchanted objects that safeguards him against the perils of magic while he himself is simultaneously an enchanted and/or higher-dimensional being himself, allowing for magical powers. Arion chiefly use a white magic variant of "Atlantean magic" originating from his connection to the extradimensional Darkworld; at his peak, his powers are considered limitless and has a wide array of abilities, including the capacity to alter his size, cast illusions, and unleash natural disasters. When depowered or severely limited due to circumstances, Arion can only utilize magic from tapping into sources of magic from anything, including unconventional ones (ex. fires and earthquakes) and can project illusions from existing water vapor or dust. According to Paul Kupperburg, this brand of magic differs from those used by other sorcerers such as Doctor Fate.

Alongside his magical abilities, Arion possesses heightened senses that acts as a danger sense, psychic abilities, and the gift of prophecy, enabling him to perceive disturbances in both the present and the future. While favoring magical solutions, Arion is also a skilled hand-to-hand combatant, swordsman and is a scam artist, particularly a dealer of the three-card monte. Having a genius-level intellect, he is a technological and scientific expert responsible for the advanced technology Atlantis possess in the modern era. As a sorcerer and genius, Arion also has a vast amount of resources; from his father, he inherited the Citadel of Sorcery, a large structure, decorated with Atlantean and Egyptian-esque designs, acting as a sanctum and Arion's base of operations, possesses a large collection of knowledge and artifacts, and is a source of magical power which can awaken other's abilities. His typical wear includes the Mantle of the Savior, A magical robes with mystic properties weaved by his father with mystical threads. Complimenting his robe is the mystic gem of Ahri'ahn, a gem from Darkworld that powers magic by converting solar energy into mystic energy. He also carries crystals from his father's shattered crystal ball, imbued with a portion of his father's divine power and magic. As a limited and finite source, he uses them only in emergencies. He also constructed the Staff of Arion, a conduit of Atlantean magic he can summon at will. The staff is also owned by Traci 13. Among his most deadly creation is the Tear of Extinction, a fusion of magic and technology that takes the form of a liquid substance infused with the "Death Force" a cosmic force capable of killing gods and sends them to the afterlife known as the Graveyard of the Gods but its usage can drive the user insane.

While a powerful Lord of Order, Arion possess several weaknesses. Much of Arion's magical powers originates from a source, be it the extradimensional Darkworld or arcane objects to act from such as his mystic gem and crystals. When acting with the latter, arcane objects limited the true capacity of his powers. Arion's magical power has also been limited from strain, be it from grand feats of magic or being injured for a prolonged period of time.

== Supporting casts ==
His first series included various supporting characters who primarily resided in an era of ancient Atlantis before it sunk, with many characters having characteristics stemmed from different races while predating all known civilizations: his chief allies and friends include Wyynde, a lieutenant royal guard and royal prince of the people of Khe-Wannantu (who resemble Native Americans) who is fiercely loyal to him following Arion's resurrection curing his blindness he garnered in battle. Chian, a noblewoman-turned mercenary, captain of the Atlantean royal guard, and Wyynde's superior who resembles an East Asian, serves as his love interest. Mara was a street-wise ancient Atlantean from Thamuz with shapeshifting powers based in Atlantean magic. The character would return in his second series in the form of a dog, having been stuck in the form due to being her last transformation before the magic of Atlantis disappeared for a millennia, retaining only immortality. Calculha appeared in the first series and is often mentioned posthumously in the second, being a god and the Sorcerer Supreme of his era responsible for fathering and teaching Arion the mystic arts. He was also summoned for a time through crystals.

His civilian cast included King D'Tilluh, the non-magically powers homo magi king with an appearance befitting an African who he serves loyally and seen as a second father-figure, and monarch adviser Wing whose appearance is also East Asian. The Atlantean pantheon of deities also serve being among his cast, counted among the Lords of Chaos and Order retroactively; this includes Deedra, who was a goddess rivaling Calculha and responsible for maintaining a magic chain that represented sorcery bound to Atlantis. Gemimn was a goddess in ancient Atlantean times that represented a force of order and sanity. In modern settings, Gemimn took form as a African-American. Former enemies such as Weaver and Chaon, the former a trickster god who created magical threats that granted magical power and the latter once the reigning god of darkness and chaos respectively, eventually served as reluctant allies and friends alongside the other mentioned god in the modern era akin to retired elders.His second series introduced Amanda Crowley, a human neighbor whose loyalty, care for him, and tenacity over the years creates complicated feelings with him beyond platonic, in which he considers bizarre and inappropriate.

Beyond his series, the character has taken several lovers over the course of his immortal lifetime. In the Emperor Aquaman series, fellow supporting cast member Vivienne (an adaptation of the Lady of the Lake) is also hinted to harbor romantic feelings for Arion.

=== Villains and enemies ===
The character's most reoccurring enemy is Garn Daanuth, a rival sorcerer, Lord of Chaos, and master of black magic later revealed to be his twin brother. While the pair share similar features, Garn is instead depicted as being slightly more toned and originally having darker skin like their mother (with features like Nubians) until he is mystically scarred by Arion, appearing similarly to those afflicted with albinism. Garn is supported by underling S'Net, a cunning humanoid jackal mercenary who served as his lieutenant and possess a bionic arm built by Garn's scientific expertise. Dark Majistra also serves as a chief enemy, being his mother who raised Garn as her acolyte and favored son. Sharing Garn's physical characteristics and rival to Calculha, her opposite and husband, she is a force of strife and darkness seeing to bring a dark age of magic to Atlantis, believing it will lead to a golden age. Unlike the other deities, she is not a goddess originating from Darkworld.

Also enemies with the Lords of Chaos, other foes includes Chaon, sibling of Tynan and Gemimn who acts as the chief god of evil, madness, and chaos. He would later serve as a reluctant ally in the modern era, having retired. Minor foes includes Thalas, a Lord of Chaos Garned once summoned and a rival of Deedra. The Weaver also served as a complicated enemy due to his connection to Jheryll, Arion's adoptive mother, and also was a foe of Power Girl.

When acting as an antagonist, the character is a significant foe to some incarnations Doctor Fate and Blue Beetle respectively; both Nabu and Kent Nelson once aided Jaime Reyes in battling the foe, with the former responsible for sealing him prior. Khalid Nassour would come into conflict while under Merlin's mental control as "Sapphire Knight", both involving in a premonition of the Tower of Fate's destruction at one interval. As a foe, Arion is supported by his demonic apprentice and underling, Mordecai Cull.

== Other versions ==
- A alien-like version of Arion appears in the Aquaman: Andromeda Black Label series.
- Arion also appears as a character in the Aquaman: Yo-Ho-Hold Onto Your Hook webseries.
- William "Bill" Knightley is a sorcerous superhero debuting in Day of Vengeance #1 (June, 2005), created by Bill Willingham and Justiniano. A hero inspired by the legends of Arion, he took his name in hopes of jump starting his career and was present as among the heroes assisting in battling a maddened and host-less Spectre. Later, he encounters a time-travelled version of Arion from the 15th century, who considers him a fraudulent imitator and captures him despite his pleas to act as advisor. After battling Superman in a bid to make him give up his "alien interference" to stave potential, catastrophic dark futures and is defeat, he used Bill and places a long-lasting disguise spell to take his place in custody.

== In other media ==
- Arion appears in Young Justice, voiced by David Kaye. This version is the grandson of Vandal Savage, the first king of Atlantis, an agent of the Lords of Order, and ancestor of the Atlanteans and Homo Magi whose magic was derived from his crown. After learning Vandal's intention to sink Atlantis and further the Atlantean and Homo Magi, Arion died opposing him while Klarion the Witch Boy fulfilled Vandal's plot. In the present, Vandal attempts to obtain Arion's crown by creating a clone of him inhabited by Ocean Master's mind, who is eventually killed by the Lords of Order.
- Arion appears as a character summon in Scribblenauts Unmasked: A DC Comics Adventure.
