= Magno (character) =

DC Comics character

- Magno as depicted in Legionnaires #43 (December 1996). Art by Jeff Moy.

Publication information
- Publisher: DC Comics
- First appearance: Legionnaires #43 (December 1996)
- Created by: Roger Stern; Tom McCraw; Jeff Moy

In-story information
- Alter ego: Dyrk Magz
- Species: Braalian
- Place of origin: Braal
- Team affiliations: Science Police; Legion of Super-Heroes
- Abilities: None, formerly magnetism manipulation

Magno (Dyrk Magz) is a superhero in the post-Zero Hour future of the DC Comics universe, and a former member of the Legion of Super-Heroes. He first appeared in Legionnaires #43 (December 1996), and was created by Roger Stern, Tom McCraw, and Jeff Moy.

== Fictional character biography ==
Like Legion founder Cosmic Boy, Dyrk Magz is a Braalian who possesses power over magnetism. He is the first candidate to distinguish himself at the tryouts held by the Legion. Although acting leader Live Wire is reluctant to recruit a replacement for Cosmic Boy, who is stranded in the 20th century, Dyrk's quick thinking and willingness to take action earn him a place in the Legion and the codename Magno.

His service in the Legion is short-lived. After successfully deterring several rejected applicants' attempt at re-opening the newly filled membership slots, Magno and the other two new recruits, Sensor and Umbra, join the rest of the Legion in battling Mordru. In the following battle with Mordru, Magno loses his powers for unknown reasons.

Dyrk returns home to Braal, but is unable to cope with the loss of his powers. Eventually, Live Wire convinces Dyrk to return to the Legion by offering the newly finished Outpost Allon as a neutral ground that he can stay on. After the time-lost Legionnaires return from the 20th century, Dyrk joins the Outpost's support staff, handling monitor duty and administration.

=== Science Police ===
Upon the disbanding of the Legion after the Blight and the loss of Outpost Allon, Dyrk joins the Science Police, following in the footsteps of his older brother Omar. He is assigned to patrol his home planet Braal and unwittingly becomes involved in an operation of the re-forming Legion when he attempts to arrest Cosmic Boy for vigilantism, which had been outlawed by the United Planets. Upon learning that Cosmic Boy had intentionally gotten himself arrested to steal a faster-than-light ship, Dyrk agrees to cover for him on the condition that he be brought in on everything when circumstances allowed.

== Powers and abilities ==
Currently none, formerly the ability to generate and control magnetic fields.

== In other media ==
Magno appears as a character summon in Scribblenauts Unmasked: A DC Comics Adventure.
