= Alternative versions of Doctor Fate =

Through the publication history of DC Comics, several alternative versions of Doctor Fate have been created with usage of the codename in DC Comics. A legacy hero within the DC Universe, Kent Nelson is the original version of the character while the modern incarnation is Khalid Nassour. In addition to the pair, several other characters have adopted the codename in mainstream continuities and also simultaneously exist within the DC Multiverse.

== Other mainstream versions ==
=== Eric and Linda Strauss ===
Eric and Linda Strauss are a pair of superheroes appearing in American comic books published by DC Comics. Debuting in Doctor Fate #1 (July 1987) and created by J. M. DeMatteis and Keith Giffen, both characters are the original successors of Doctor Fate and agents of order advised by Nabu in Kent's deceased body whom could merge as one entity known as "Doctor Fate". When merged into a singular entity known as "Doctor Fate", the pair possess similar powers to Nelson's own, potentially surpassing the other in raw power. The pair could also split into two separate entities, although their complete power is halved. Due to being novice sorcerer(s), the incarnation lacked knowledge in the supernatural compared to Kent and were considered unremarkable retroactively.

Born to wealthy billionaire Henry Strauss and Rebecca Strauss, the former abusive to both his son and wife, ten year old Eric grew up with a keen awareness for the Lords of Order and exhibited a abnormal personality that made him incompatible with children at his age. Conversely, Linda was Henry's second wife (and Eric's step-mother) following Rebecca's suicide and married him for his wealth but comes to regret it upon finding his abusive tendencies but found herself fond of Eric. Nabu and an aged, reluctant Kent selects Eric as the next Doctor Fate, aging up the boy in a similar manner to Nelson before although his mind did not mature. Faced against Typhoon, a Lord of Chaos, the pair discovered they merged to form Doctor Fate and defeat the threat as Kent passes on. A merging pair to become Doctor Fate, Nabu would supplant Kent's corpse as his own to advise them. The three of them are soon joined by a friendly demon called Petey and lawyer Jack C. Small. In the Cosmic Odyssey miniseries, they assist Darkseid, Highfather, and other heroes and villains in battling a sentient being made up of Anti-Life energies.

Over time, despite Eric's mind being similar to a child of ten years old, Linda developed romantic feelings for her stepson while Eric reciprocated such feelings. Eric is eventually killed on Apokolips during a battle with DeSaad (disguised as Darkseid), forcing Linda to become Doctor Fate on her own and Eric's spirit discovers his soul alongside Linda and his parents were part of a reincarnation cycle with varying dynamics, explaining their connection and attraction. Linda is killed soon afterward by the Lords of Chaos. Eric and Linda's souls are reincarnated in the bodies of Eugene and Wendy DiBellia while Nabu reincarnates in Eugene and Wendy's unborn child. In their place, Kent and Inza Nelson are revived in younger bodies.

=== Inza Cramer ===
Inza Cramer as Doctor Fate. Art by Scot Eaton and Peter Gross.

Kent Nelson's wife, Inza Cramer, later adopted. Succeeding Eric and Linda, Inza is inadvertently empowered by the Lords of Chaos. A spell-caster more talented than Kent and once a user of chaos magic from her patronage, she could also merge into a singular entity with Kent to gain more power. Due to having not undergone Nabu's training, Inza's mental state was at risk over time when performing magic. Inza's magic also had limitations, unable to conventionally cure ailments such as cancer and revive others without repercussions.

As Doctor Fate, Inza's role in the 1988 Doctor Fate ongoing series has her a protector of an impoverish section in New York City with a focus on social class issues in addition to battling supernatural entities. She also appears in the War of the Gods storyline to aid Wonder Woman and other heroes to thwart Circe's efforts to destroy Earth. During the "Zero Hour: Crisis in Time!" storyline in 1994, Kent and Inza merge to become Doctor Fate, but are defeated by Extant, and are rapidly aged with the loss of their artifacts, leaving them powerless. In the original Fate series, the married coupled are killed after having hired smuggler Jared Stevens to retrieve Fate's artifacts from demons. With the pair dead, circumstances also leads Stevens to claim the mantle, albeit in his own unique manner as "Fate". When Stevens' origin was rebooted in 1997 by Keith Giffen, circumstances differ with Kent and Inza, the latter whose mental health were compromised in her brief time as Doctor Fate. Kent manages to trick Stevens into the role, allowing the both of them to ascend into the afterlife while Stevens is burdened with the mantle.

=== Fate (Jared Stevens) ===
Jared Stevens as Fate. Art by Anthony Williams, Andy Lanning, and James Sinclair.

- First appearance: Fate #0 (1994)
- Created by: John Francis Moore, Anthony Williams
- Teams: Lords of Balance; Institute for Phenomenological Study
- Abilities: Mystically enhanced physiology, acclerated healing, resistance to magic, and telepathic control of darts. Can sense other's futures from ankh tattoo; skilled hand-to-hand combatant, weaponry, and thievery skills. Magical knife can damage magical foes and virtually impervious
- Aliases: Fate; Repairman of Reality

Jared Stevens, also known as Fate, is a superhero appearing American comic books published by DC Comics created as the fifth incarnation of Doctor Fate, debuting in Fate #0 in 1994, and created by John Francis Moore and Anthony Williams. An often-thought unpopular revision, Fate is an unpopular (with both the superhero and mystic community alike) demon-hunter with no spell-casting powers and agent for the Lords of Balance investigating supernatural matters. Some revisions have omitted this versions' history in main continuity.

In his original Fate series, he is the son of an account and criminal mother raised in Boston by the former until he moves to Europe at sixteen but distances himself from his mother by going to law school as an adult. Wanting a more exciting life, he joins the Institute for Phenomenological Study as an adventurer and is caught in a race for a magical artifact, leading to his first supernatural experience he dismisses as a hallucination. Now a smuggler for artifacts, he finds himself seeking the artifacts of Doctor Fate but when the Nelsons are killed by demons led by Kingdom, his status as the next incarnation is revealed but resists Nabu's control with the Amulet of Anubis's power, causing a mystic explosion that brands an ankh tattoo over his eye and grants him powers and cripples his arm, held together by the Cloak of Destiny outfitted as a makeshift bandage. Becoming the demon hunter Fate, he works with Scare Tactics, Etrigan the Demon, and other forces to combat threats from the realm of Gemworld.

In the rebooted Book of Fate series, he is instead assisted by Arnold's sibling, Vera Burnsteel. Both Burnsteels are accomplished hackers and conspiracy theorists who seek to help him understand his role through occult research. Jared is later murdered by Mordru, who attempts to kill all the agents of the Lords of Chaos and Order and claim Fate's artifacts for himself. Jared's equipment reverts to its original forms and returns to the Tower of Fate upon his death. His tenure is defined later to have lasted at least over a year before he was succeeded by Hector Hall.

=== Hector Hall ===
- First appearance: Countdown to Mystery #1 (November, 2007)
- Created by: As Doctor Fate: JSA #3 (October 1999)
- Species: Human
- Teams: Justice Society of America; Sentinels of Magic; Lords of Chaos and Order
- Abilities: Connection to Helmet of Fate grants various magical powers.
- Aliases: Earth's Mightiest Sorcerer

Hector Hall's Doctor Fate. Art by John Cassaday, Mark Lewis, and David Baron

Hector Hall is the fifth incarnation of the Doctor Fate. In his original iteration, the character was son of Hawkman (Carter Hall) and Hawkgirl (Shiera Halls) whom served as the hero, Silver Scarab. Inheriting his parents' reincarnation powers, he undergoes his own reincarnation cycle shortly after Jared Steven's death, being born as the son of Hawk and Dove (Hank Hall and Dawn Granger, the former with no relation to Carter Hall), the latter sexually assaulted by the former under Mordru's mind control to create a child he believes possess powers of order and chaos.

Shortly after his birth, Mordru accelerates Hector's aging process to adulthood, intending to usurp his power as Doctor Fate. However, he succeeds in becoming Doctor Fate. As a member of the Justice Society, he is considered less aloof and potentially great but struggles with continuing the Fate legacy and both he and his teammates question if he can balance his responsibilities while having an ordinary life. On a later adventure in Kahndaq, Hector and Nabu clash as the latter argues the legitimacy of Black Adam's current agenda and accuses him of blindly following his father. Nabu later takes control of Hector and imprisons his spirit in the Amulet of Anubis. Within the Amulet, he is reunited with the previous incarnations of Doctor Fate: Kent Nelson, Eric Strauss, and Linda Strauss, who help him trap Nabu inside the Amulet. Lyta and Hector return to the Tower of Fate and live happily until they are trapped in Hell by the Spectre, who is on a rampage to destroy all magic. Near death, Lyta and Hector enter a portal to the Dreaming as their physical bodies die.

A novice sorcerer, Hector wielded a vast array of spells and "eldritch formulae", his source of power is from both Nabu's suggestions while his spirit inhabits the helm and the ability to cast spells verbally. He is considered potentially among the most powerful of incarnations. Hall's spell-craft is borrowed from a variety of cultures (Mayans, the Picts, ancient Egyptians,) and his magical power can be derived from several white, dark, order, and chaos magics. However, his powers are tied to using the Helmet of Fate as a focal point of his magic and can be disrupted if he is unable to speak.

=== Kent V. Nelson ===
Kent V. Nelson as Doctor Fate. Art by Jesús Merino and Allen Passalaqua.

- First appearance: Countdown to Mystery #1 (November, 2007)
- Created by: Steve Gerber, Justiniano
- Species: Human
- Teams: Justice Society of America
- Abilities: Extensive medical knowledge in psychiatry, magical powers via Helmet of Fate, and supernatural knowledge
- Aliases: Sorcerer Supreme, Mystic Maven

Kent V. Nelson is a superhero in American comic books published by DC Comics. Created by writer Steve Gerber and artist Justiniano, he first appeared in Countdown to Mystery #1 (November 2007) as the seventh character to use the Doctor Fate codename. Succeeding the Hector Hall incarnation, the character was created in order to simplify the Doctor Fate character, featuring several departures.

The grand-nephew of Kent Nelson (his namesake), Kent V. Nelson is a former psychiatrist whose life falls apart when his wife learns of his infidelity and he loses his license to practice from malpractice stemming from his depression. Kent dons the Helmet of Fate and assumes the role prior to the Final Crisis. During the Reign in Hell storyline, he battles Lady Blaze and assists other supernatural heroes in an intervention in Hell's affairs due to a civil war waged by Satanus and Blaze herself. Inexperienced, he manages to defeat Blaze but both siblings managed to secure the throne, ultimately going to Blaze. Later joining the JSA, he helps the team battle Mordru.

Similar to Marvel Comics' Doctor Strange, the helm provides spell-casting powers that allows the younger Nelson to utilize a consistent set of spells and charms. Among his spell-craft includes those within the helm, in which has a library of spells for Nelson to use and could utilize basic magical spells. Unlike prior versions, however, Gerber imposed limitations such as the Helmet for this iteration no longer conferring a mastery of magic and being a novice sorcerer, making his knowledge limited. With his powers originating from the helm, Nelson was depowered without it.

=== Temporary incarnations ===
Several characters briefly came into possession of the Helmet of Fate due to circumstances, allowing them to become Doctor Fate temporarily:

- Superman was briefly given the helm by Khalid Nassour to help battle the mystical supervillain Xanadoth.
- When Nezha gained the Helmet of Fate by defeating Nassour, Batman later usurped it and briefly became Doctor Fate.
- Detective Chimp was briefly chosen as Doctor Fate but relinquished it due to the overbearing information it placed in his mind.
- Sand briefly used the helm to confer with Nabu and explain his Hector Hall's disappearance.
- Okeontis was an alien freedom fighter possessed by an alien fungus whom gained the Helmet of Fate. The helm's significant power caused the Presence to send Zauriel to intervene.
- Black Alice was a candidate, but the helm rejected her in part due to her intentions and forceful nature.

== Alternate versions ==
Several other versions of the character exist in alternate versions of the DC Universe often to as the Multiverse. Within these fictional parallel universes, each of these characters appear within their own continuity and stories, often differing from versions depicted within the mainstream comic books. These versions of the character specifically are different characters and incarnations typically disassociated with the mainstream bearers (i.e. Strangefate) and/or possess varying different characteristics despite sharing aspects (i.e. Doc Fate).

Alter ego	Creator(s)	First appearance	Description
Khalid Ben-Hassin	James Robinson, Nicola Scott	Earth 2 #9 (April, 2013)	Khalid Ben-Hassin is an Egyptian-American archaeologist and expert on the occult and magic on Earth-2 who encounters the famed Helmet of Fate, a Mother Box containing the essence of the wizard Nabu, and dons it to become the superhero known as Doctor Fate, a member of the Wonders of the World.
Richard John "Dick" Grayson	J.T. Krul, Mikel Janin	Flashpoint: Deadman and the Flying Graysons #1 (August, 2011)	In the Flashpoint timeline, Richard John "Dick" Grayson becomes Doctor Fate following Kent Nelson's death and being hunted by Starfire and the Amazons seeking the helm. He is assisted by Deadman.
Unknown	Marc Andreyko, Kevin Maguire	Supergirl Vol 7 #33 (November, 2019)	This unnamed Doctor Fate resides in an alternate future based upon a new future taking place adjacent to "Prime Earth". A six-armed male alien, this version is a member of the Legion of Super-Heroes and a revered sorcerer known to the United Planets.
Charles Xavier / Doctor Strangefate	Ron Marz José Luis García-López Kevin Nowlan	Marvel Versus DC #1 (1996)	Charles Xavier of Earth-9602/Earth-1996 is a mutant and telepath who learns the mystic arts through Nabu the Ancient One. Taking the Helmet of Strangefate and mantle of Sorcerer Supreme, he becomes a powerful but unconventional hero who often assists the Judgement League of Avengers and employs others at his steed despite his power. He is assisted by his servant, Myx. This character is an amalgamation of Doctor Strange and Professor X from Marvel Comics alongside Doctor Fate.

=== Sofie ===
- First appearance: New Golden Age #1 (2022)
- Created by: Geoff Johns
- Teams: Justice Society (31st Century); Terrific Ten
- Abilities: Helmet of Fate and Learned Bracers grants magical powers and abilities.

An alternate version originating alternate future based upon the original version appearing in the 1958 Legion of Super-Heroes, this futuristic Doctor Fate of the 31st Century (or simply Doctor Fate), whose real name is Sofie, is a founding member of the 31st-century iteration of the Justice Society. She first appeared in New Golden Age #1 (November, 2022), created by Geoff Johns (writer), Steve Lieber, and Jerry Ordway (artists). Like Khalid Nassour, Sofie is a dark-skinned Egyptian-American and sports a similar helmet design.

She first appears as among Per Degaton's casualties as he seeks to kill Doctor Fate and the JSA across history, targeting the former due to the helm's ability to block his precognition and manages to kill her. Sofie's existence is later saved by Nassour, who pulls her from her moment of death to help the past and 2020s JSA iteration seal away Degaton. In her own distant future, it is stated that she would eventually be succeeded by her granddaughter as Doctor Fate. A time-displaced version of the character appeared as a member of Mister Terrific's Terrific Ten team.

== Villain counterparts ==
Name		Creator(s)	First appearance	Fictional biography
Doctor Chaos	Burt Belker	Martin Pasko Kurt Schaffenberger	The New Adventures of Superboy #25 (1982)	Burt Belker is a wealthy, college student studying archaeology and an assistant of Lewis Lang (father of Lana Lang) who briefly dated his daughter. Discovering a "Sumerian" helm revealed to be the Helmet of Chaos, he dons it and is taken over by the personality within it and comes into conflict with Superboy.
Doctor Chaos	Unknown	Steve Orlando Hugo Petrus	Justice League of America (2017) #18	A new unnamed version of Doctor Chaos serves a protector of Chaos Realm, home of the Lords of Chaos. He is ambushed and seemingly killed by the Queen of Fables.
Anti-Fate	Dr. Benjamin Stoner	J. M. DeMatteis Keith Giffen	Doctor Fate #1 (1987)	Dr. Benjamin Stoner is a lead doctor in Arkham Asylum driven insane by Typhon, a Lord of Chaos. Targeting an aged Kent Nelson, Typhon uses him to battle Kent and his successor, Eric and Linda Strauss, with a dark variant of the Helmet of Fate as the adversary, Anti-Fate.
Doctor Hate	Rachel Roth / Raven	Joshua Williamson Howard Porter	Knight Terrors: Night's End #1 (August 2023)	Raven is the daughter of Trigon and a superhero often portrayed with empathic and sorcerous powers. Sometime after the aftermath of "Lazarus Planet", the dark counterpart of the Helmet of Fate, the Helmet of Hate, is created. Raven's demonic self separates from her and becomes independent, donning the helm and the Nightmare Stone. As Doctor Hate, she has powers comparable to Doctor Fate and the power to manipulate minds.

== Reception ==
While the Hector Hall version was considered a fan-favorite during the 1999 JSA run, the Jared Stevens incarnation was panned due to his design and departure from the common elements of the character. The Eric and Linda Strauss' version has also been panned due to the characters' dynamic being that of lovers despite the age gap and relation between older Linda and child Eric whom was aged up physically, the former view as a pedophile and unnecessarily sexualized compared to her male counterpart.

== See also ==
- Doctor Fate
- Doctor Fate (Khalid Nassour)
