= Lords of Chaos and Order =

Fictional supernatural powers in DC comics

- The Avatars of the Lords of Chaos (right) and the Avatars of the Lords of Order as seen in Fate #22.

Publication information
- Publisher: DC Comics
- First appearance: 1st Issue Special #9 (December 1975) (alluded to); DC Special Series #10 (1978) (actual appearance)

Characteristics
- Place of origin: Various (includes Cilia, Realm of Chaos, Realm of Order, Cilia, and Darkworld)
- Notable members: Lords:Nabu, Mordru, Klarion the Witch Boy, Wizard Shazam, Arion, Amethyst; Agents: Doctor Fate (various), Phantom Stranger, Eclipso, Hawk and Dove
- Inherent abilities: Immense magical powers and cosmic influence; representatives/embodiments of the concepts relating to of order and chaos and affiliated aspects.

The Lords of Chaos and Order (or separately the Lords of Order and Lords of Chaos) are a fictional group of contemporary, supernatural entities featured in American comic books published by DC Comics. Although alluded to in 1st Issue Special #9 (December 1975), their physical appearance was first showcased in DC Special Series #10 (1978). Typically associated with the Doctor Fate character and comic books, they are also featured across other titles and associated with other characters.

As magical beings created by the ultimate creator of the DC Universe embodying various concepts or relate to order and chaos respectively and employ other beings as agents to act in their stead, these two groups are locked in a cosmic struggle for supremacy against one another; a focal point in their struggle includes the Lords of Chaos' attempts to invoke a period characterized by the dominance of chaos in existence (described in Hindu cosmology known as the Kali Yuga), whereas the Lords of Order strive to prevent this invocation and maintain balance. Among the most notable of the Lords of Order includes Nabu, whose radical and fierce personality marks him a dissident among his brethren but is also the progenitor of Order's most powerful agent and mystic defender, Doctor Fate. At times, the two are aided by the Lords of Balance (or Lords of Eternal Balance), whose roles includes preventing the pair's struggle causing the complete destruction of one another or existence as collateral from their struggle.

The Lords of Chaos and Order have been adapted in various media, including the Young Justice animated series and the Injustice 2 video game. They play significant roles in these adaptations, with the Young Justice series featuring several characters affiliated with the group, and Injustice 2 heavily referencing their influence in the game's narrative.

== Publication history ==
The Lords of Chaos and Order would first be alluded to in 1st Issue Special #9 (December 1975). Later, the group would make a physical appearance in DC Special Series #10 (1978).

== Fictional group history ==
=== Creation ===
Both elemental forces were born during the creation of the universe; those who affiliated with serving "order" are known as the Lord of Order and Light (or simply the Lords of Order) and those who affiliated with serving "chaos" being known as the Lords of Chaos and Darkness (or simply Lords of Chaos). Some respective early agents and lords originate from a myriad of places, including Darkworld and Cilia, the former being home to those who would later identify with the pantheon of ancient Atlantean deities.

According to Hindu philosophy, the age of the universe and mankind is divided into four different cycles of ages in which the first age marks order ruling with perfection. In the second age, chaos begins to spread its subtle influence so that in the third age, chaos can go to war with order. In the final era, chaos triumphs and ushers in an age known as the Kali Yuga. After this age, the cycle restarts when the age ends and the universe itself also ends, resulting in a rebirth of a new universe in which Order rules once more.

=== Pre-history ===
In 500,000 BC, long after the agents and Lords of Chaos and Order from Darkworld established themselves as a pantheon existing within Atlantis, demigods Arion and Garn Daanuth were born to Calculha and Dark Majistra, agents of order and chaos respectively. The pair would later create the Zodiac Crystals, powerful objects patterned after the zodiac signs in which directed and amplified the magic on Earth. With the pair suffering marital problems due to their conflicting divine natures and their children prophesied to eternally battle for the fate of Atlantis and end the Ice Age (caused by their family feud). Arion and Garn would eventually fulfill the prophecy thousands of years later around 45,000BC with Arion recognized as Atlantis's savior when he ended the Ice Age with his magic. Despite this, Arion was unable to ultimately save his iteration of Atlantis as its king in his later years, his city eventually suffering a decline due to a combination of events: the waning magic on Earth, Garn's alliance with the immortal Vandal Savage creating the proto-Illuminati, and its actual destruction by the Lord of Chaos and God of Evil, Chaon. Although the homo magi kingdom in which Arion ruled was destroyed, contrary to his belief, other remnants of Atlantis survived.

Later, the Gemworld dimension was once among the domains controlled and owned by the Lords of Chaos until a deal was struck with sorceress Citrina when magic began to fade due to an alignment of the stars. Intending to find and populate a land where homo magi, faerie, and other magical creatures alike can live and thrive in a magical rich environment, the deal was made and the arrangement was kept secret from the history of Gemworld.

=== Modern age ===
In the 2005 Day of Vengeance crossover, Eclipso seduces the Spectre into slaughtering most of Earth's magic users after she claimed that magic was the source of all of Earth's evil. Nabu organizes a team of magical beings to stop the Spectre and seal the Seven Deadly Sins. Nabu confronts the Spectre, and the Presence binds the Spectre to a new host, Crispus Allen. Although Nabu dies, his helmet is left with its significant powers. The deaths of the Lords of Order and Chaos caused magic to break down into its basic raw state, which marks the end of the Ninth Age of Magic within the DC Universe, and the beginning of the Tenth. Amethyst and Mordru are the only known Lords to have survived into the Tenth Age.

=== DC Rebirth ===
In post-DC Rebirth continuity, the Lords of Chaos and Order are presented with a new origin; they were among the first mages on Earth and stole magic from the goddess Hecate. Unlike the classical Greek mythology stories, Hecate was a primordial spirit of magic and predates most, if not, all other godly pantheons and once settled to be affiliated with the Greek pantheon. As their power rose, they ascended to a higher plane of existence and became the Lords of Chaos and Order and began controlling the magic in the known universe. However, conflicting origins have risen within DC's canonical universe; while some stories utilize the newly revised origin, other stories utilize an origin similar to the previous one. In this origin, the Lords of Chaos and Order were created from the Source as one of the first cosmic forces in the universe before the likes of both Old Gods (gods of both fantasy and real-world inspired pantheons) and New Gods. The Darkworld also exists in this revised universe, the entity and its body that makes up the dimension having been explained to be a piece of the Great Darkness, the true embodiment and source of evil and darkness in the universe.

Several Lords of Order appear in the Blue Beetle storyline "Hard Choices". Insane Arion battled Nabu thousands of years ago, having sought Khaji-Da to save Atlantis after receiving a vision from the future where he learns of the eventual destruction of Atlantis and the scarab falsely promised him the ability to save it. Nabu succeeds in sealing away Arion and sets him in a tomb located in a dimension parallel to what would be El Paso, Texas. Arion later frees himself through his lackey, Mordecai Cull, and he is initially successful in defeating Doctor Fate and overpowering Khaji-Da's will. Jaime Reyes narrowly defeats Arion by using his connection to the scarab against him, draining him of most of his magical power before Doctor Fate arrives and seals him away. Although the initial story claimed that Arion was driven insane by exposure to Khaji-Da centuries ago, a later story clarified Arion was driven mad from being exposed to his Tear of Extinction and the Death Force as a side effect of using it against alien sea gods on Poseidon's behest.

Both the Lords of Order and Chaos would make an appearance in the "Trials of Harley Quinn" storyline, seeking a new agent to act as a galactic angel of retribution, a title bestowed to a being to act as one of the balancing agents between order and chaos and tasked Mirand'r (the spirit of a dead Tamaranean originating from seventy years prior) to fill the position. She recommends the former supervillain, Harley Quinn, as she possesses traits associated with both order and chaos. While Harley passes the trials, she betrays the Lords of Chaos and Order moments after receiving their power after mistakenly concluding her mother's death was among the trials they orchestrated. The Lord of Order and Chaos representatives explain that their trials are woven into events naturally occurring and thus her mother was destined to die. While Harley rejects the position, she appeals to the Lords of Chaos and Order by recommending Mirand'r, who understood the role. The Lords of Chaos and Order accept her proposition and revive Mirand'r, making her an agent of balance.

In the Justice League Dark storyline "Lords of Order", when the Source Wall cracks, the law and forces surrounding magic begin to change. Nabu senses the risks it would bring: a race of magical beings known the Otherkind would be unleashed. Nabu and the other Lords of Order plot to destroy the Sphere of the Gods, the source of magic. While this act would kill all magical beings, this radical plan would ensure the multiverse's continual survival with many Lords of Order content with this plan. In doing so, they force upon mystical objects to notable wizards and sorceresses including Madame Xanadu, Mark Merlin and Prince Ra-Man, and Extraño. Controlling Kent Nelson himself, Nabu would imprison both Kent's apprentice and nephew, Khalid Nassour, and later the Phantom Stranger. Coming into conflict with Justice League Dark, the team seeks out Mordru, who reveals more of their origin and his role as the one who tortured Hecate personally. Using an artifact known as the Ruby of Life, he temporarily turns the members of Justice League Dark into Lords of Chaos to enable them to battle the Lords of Order. Eventually, Nabu and the other Lords of Order are defeated and the team reverts to their original form.

== Membership ==
=== Reoccurring members ===
Character	First appearance
Lords of Order
Arion	Warlord #55 (March 1982)
Amethyst	Legion of Super-Heroes #298 (April 1983)
Kismet	Adventures of Superman #494 (September 1992)
Nabu	More Fun Comics #67 (May 1941)
Agents of Order
Kent Nelson (Doctor Fate)	More Fun Comics #55 (May 1940)
Khalid Nassour (Doctor Fate)	Convergence: Aquaman #2 (May 2015)
Phantom Stranger	Phantom Stranger #1 (August/September 1952)
Dove	Showcase #75 (June 1968)
Lords of Chaos
Garn Daanuth	The Warlord #62 (July 1982)
Klarion the Witch Boy	The Demon #7 (March 1973)
Mordru	Adventure Comics #369 (June 1968)
Wizard Shazam	Whiz Comics #2 (February 1940)
Agents of Chaos
Dark Opal	Legion of Super-Heroes Vol 2 #298 (April 1983)
Hawk	Showcase #75 (June 1968)
Eclipso	House of Secrets #61 (August 1963)
Note: Wizard Shazam was characterized as a Lord of Order prior to Flashpoint.

=== Lesser known and other members ===
==== Lords of Order ====
- Gemimn: A divine being hailing from Darkworld and the sibling of Tynan and Chaon. She holds the title of the Atlantean Goddess of Order and serves as a Lord of Order. While typically depicted as a female entity, Gemimn assumes the mortal form of an elderly African American male.
- Kilderkin: A manifestation of order, Kilderkin was dispatched in order to negotiate with Dream and secure Hell after Lucifer's unexpected abdicating of the throne. Kilderkin's manifestation in the mortal plane is in the form of a cardboard box and speaks through printed messages. He also has a servant that acts as his means of mobility.
- Myrath / Lord Structure: Manifesting through the arcane object known as the "Gauntlets of Myrath", those who act as his host become "Lord Structure", an Agent of Order. He forcibly once took Mark Merlin (Prince Ra-Man) as his host.
- Hoku / Master Pattern: Manifested through the arcane object of lore called the "Breastplate of Hoku", those who act as his host turn into one of the Agents of Order, "Master Pattern". Cyra took Ibis the Invincible as his host by force.
- Cyra / Sister Symmetry: Manifested through a host bearing the "Cloak of Cyra", they're possessed and turn into an agent for the Lord of Order, Cyra. Cyra focibly took Madame Xanadu as her host.
- Ohrmazd: A fictional depiction of Ahura Mazda, among the deities invoked by Doctor Fate who has membership in the Lords of Order.
- Osiris: A fictional depiction based on the ancient Egyptian deity of the same name. He is among the characters Doctor Fate invokes who has membership of the Lords of Order.
- Pantagones: He was initially designated as the guardian of Gemworld, despite being considered the weakest among the Lords of Order. Despite his limited power, Pantagones developed strong feelings of love towards Lady Amethyst, the wife of Lord Amethyst. In a complex turn of events, Pantagones and Lady Amethyst consummated their relationship while Pantagones inhabited Lord Amethyst's body. As a consequence of their union, the child Amethyst inherited Pantagones' formidable powers and is considered her true father.
- Shat-Ru: A Lord of Order who initially sought vengeance against Doctor Fate but was subsequently trapped in the body of Kent Nelson. Over time, Shat-Ru becomes an unwilling ally of Doctor Fate and eventually undergoes a rebirth. He is among the rare Lords of Order to have an intimate relationship with a human.
- Terataya: A cosmic entity that takes the form of a medallion when procuring for hosts. Unusual among her brethren, both Tertaya and T'Charr come to form a truce with one another, having fallen in love. To prove chaos and order can co-exist with one another, the pair secretly created Hawk and Dove, with Terataya empowering the latter.

==== Agents of Order ====
- Calculha: Also known as the "Ancient One", he is an esteemed figure in the Atlantean pantheon who assumes the roles of father to both Arion and Garn Daanuth and the spouse of Dark Majistra, his cosmic counterpart and equal. Despite his designation as an Agent of Order, Calculha predates the creation of many other Lords of Order and Chaos, making him significantly older and powerful. He holds the prestigious positions of the Sorcerer Supreme of Earth and the chief deity of his pantheon, surpassing all others in power. As a wise and influential figure, Calculha serves as a mentor and guide to Arion on his path as a Lord of Order (originally an agent prior to subsequent revisions). However, in his old age, Calculha meets his demise at the hands of his eldest, Garn.
- Lord Amethyst: The biological father of Amethyst, he had a crucial role as the conduit through which Pantagones possesses his body to safeguard the realm and combat the forces of evil. Although he harbors suspicions about his wife's close interactions with Pantagones, the influence of the Lord's power renders him unaware of the fact that Pantagones utilized his body to engage in an intimate relationship with Lady Amethyst.

==== Lords of Balance ====
- Tynan: Known as the "Cosmic Balancer," he is a powerful deity and sibling to the Lords of Order and Chaos, Gemimn and Chaon, respectively. Hailing from Darkworld, Tynan's role is to maintain balance by preventing the destructive forces of Order and Chaos from causing harm to the universe through physical contact. As a prominent god within the Atlantean pantheon, Tynan engaged in a conflict with Arion as part of a test orchestrated by the latter.

==== Agents of Balance ====
- Doctor Fate / Fate (Jared Stevens, Hector Hall): Some iterations of the Doctor Fate lineage served primarily acted as agents of balance, their role being to prevent the conflict between these factions and their members from causing irreparable damage to the universe.

==== Lords of Chaos ====
- Chaon: A divine entity from Darkworld, Chaon is the sibling of Tynan and Gemimn. Serving as the chief Lord of Chaos and an Atlantean God of Evil and Madness, he posed a significant threat to Arion and was considered one of his most formidable adversaries. However, over time, their relationship evolved, and Chaon transformed into a reluctant confidante of Arion.
- Chaos: Served as Inza Nelson's patron during her time as Doctor Fate. Despite his association with chaos, Chaos held the belief that the Lords of Chaos are often misunderstood as purely evil entities. He advocated for certain approaches that he believed could impede the Lords of Chaos from achieving their goals when influenced by evil forces.
- Child: A ruthless magic wielder, Child's appearance as a young boy hides his sadistic and malevolent nature. He is an enemy of Amethyst, sent to claim Gemworld in the aftermath of Dark Opal's failure to secure control for the Lords of Chaos. He is served by Flaw, a crystal golem allegedly created by a being known as the Cutter.
- Malferraze: A fictional depiction based on the Aztec deity Xipe Totec. Totec is the name given to Malferrazae by the Aztecs who were unaware of his true name and affiliation, making him their God of War. After losing his power derived from the Aztec's worship upon their decimation at the hands of the Conquistadors, he existed as a statue within his shrine, using his limited powers to compel others to sacrifice in his name until he gained enough power to free himself. Malferrazae would come into conflict with the Kent Nelson incarnation of Doctor Fate.
- Shivering Jemmy: A childlike Lord of Chaos, she instead prefers to be called a "Princess of Chaos" and was "sent" to secure Hell for the Lords of Chaos and is willing to threaten the Dream to achieve this. However, this was revealed to be a ruse with her intent to ensure the Lords of Order did not secure Hell.
- T'Charr: A cosmic entity that often takes the form of a dragon. He eventually came to have a truce with Terataya and eventually fell in love with her. The pair would work secretly to prove that order and chaos are able to peacefully co-exist and created the Hawk and Dove pair, empowering Hawk, and use as an experiment to eventually appeal to the Lords of Chaos and Order.
- Vandaemon: The Lord of Chaos who watched over the realm years before Child and Amethyst would take over the respective duties. He was responsible for killing Pantagones, depriving the realm of its chief protector for years. He later appears as an enemy of both Amethyst and Doctor Fate.
- Weaver: A Lord of Chaos hailing from the dimension of Darkworld, he is renowned as a trickster deity and an ancient Atlantean patron of madness. Notably, the Weaver has emerged as a formidable adversary of both Arion and Powergirl, engaging in conflicts with these heroic characters.
- Xanadoth: Similar to Mordru, Xanadoth is considered among the most powerful of the Lords of Chaos and a being that inhabits physical hosts, once being a ruler among them until her hunger for power and direction were held in disagreement with both the Lords of Chaos and Order, both groups fearing her and combining their might to seal her away.

==== Agents of Chaos ====
- Dark Majistra: The cosmic counterpart and wife of Calculha in the Atlantean pantheon, she stands apart from the other deities as the only one not originating from Darkworld. Within the ancient sect of gods, she played a pivotal role in raising Garn as a Lord (originally an agent prior to subsequent revisions) of Chaos. Majistra harbored ambitions to seize control of Atlantis and the Earth's magical energies from Arion and Calculha. However, her plans were thwarted when Arion ultimately killed her, intensifying Garn's deep-seated animosity towards Arion.
- Doctor Chaos: A malevolent counterpart of the Doctor Fate sorcerous lineage. The original incarnation of Doctor Chaos engaged in conflicts with Superboy (Clark Kent). However, in the current continuity, the character has undergone a revamp, now portrayed as one of the guardians of the Chaos Realm, which serves as the central hub for the activities of the Lords of Chaos.
- Doctor Fate (Inza Cramer): Inza, the fourth individual to assume the mantle of Doctor Fate, was unwittingly an agent of chaos. She possessed a unique power set primarily rooted in chaos magic, which remained unknown to both her and Kent for much of their tenure. However, despite this unconventional aspect, she valiantly took on the role of a heroic figure and dedicated her efforts to nurturing a small community within New York City.
- Doctor Hate - The demonic half of Raven who became its own being and wields the Helmet of Hate, the opposite of the Helmet of Fate.

== In other media ==
=== Television ===
- The Lords of Chaos and Order appear in the Batman: The Brave and the Bold episode "The Fate of Equinox!", with Typhon voiced by John DiMaggio and Nabu by James Arnold Taylor. Series original character Equinox (voiced by Oded Fehr) also appears, acting as a balancer between the two.
- The Lords of Chaos and Order are both featured in the Young Justice television series:
  - Nabu (voiced by Kevin Michael Richardson) was originally the mortal son of Vandal Savage from ancient Babylon who was killed by Klarion the Witch Boy via Starro. Seeking a means to combat the Lords of Chaos following their sinking of Atlantis, the Lords of Order elevate Nabu's soul to their plane of existence and bind him to the Helmet of Fate.
  - Klarion the Witch Boy (voiced by Thom Adcox-Hernandez) is a prominent member of the Light and has a history with Vandal Savage.
  - Child (voiced by Erika Ishii) is depicted as female and created Flaw herself using an Atlantean gemstone. After Klarion falls out of favor with the other Lords of Chaos, Child is sent to dispose of him.
  - Arion (voiced by David Kaye) was the grandson of Vandal Savage, the first king of Atlantis, and ancestor of the Atlanteans and Homo Magi whose magic was derived from his crown. After learning of Savage's intention to sink Atlantis and further the Atlantean and Homo Magi, Arion died opposing him while Klarion fulfilled Savage's plot. In the present, Savage creates a clone of Arion inhabited by Ocean Master's mind to retrieve his crown, who is ultimately killed by the Lords of Order.

=== Film ===
- Nabu makes non-speaking appearances in flashbacks in Suicide Squad: Hell to Pay.
- Sister Symmetry appears on a Mural at the Hall of Justice in Superman.

=== Video games ===
The Lords of Order appear in Injustice 2. Having decided that humanity is only capable of chaos, they aid Brainiac in his campaign to conquer Earth, forcing Doctor Fate to do their bidding. Eventually, Superman frees Fate by destroying his helmet before the latter is killed by Brainiac.
