= Klarion the Witch Boy =

Comic book supervillain

Klarion the Witch-Boy
- Klarion the Witch Boy and Teekl. Art by Amancay Nahuelpan.

Publication information
- Publisher: DC Comics
- First appearance: The Demon #7 (March 1973)
- Created by: Jack Kirby

In-story information
- Alter ego: Klarion Bleak
- Species: Croatoan
- Place of origin: Limbo Town
- Team affiliations: Lords of Chaos; Injustice League Dark; Suicide Squad Black; Seven Soldiers
- Partnerships: Teekl (familiar); Solomon Grundy
- Notable aliases: Klarion the Witch Boy
- Abilities: Nearly limitless magical powers (flight, teleportation, energy projection, etc.) and extensive knowledge of the supernatural; also possess a psychic link to Teekl and is a capable trickster.

Klarion the Witch Boy is a fictional character appearing in American comic books published by DC Comics, having first appeared in The Demon #7 (March 1973) and was created by Jack Kirby. The character serves as a recurring adversary to various other mystical characters and teams alike.

Originating from an other-worldly dimension, Klarion Bleak is a mischievous and immature warlock who flees from his home to Earth, crossing paths with various heroes. He is typically assisted by his gender-fluid cat familiar, Teekl. Often erring towards villainy or being portrayed as an anti-hero, the character is a trickster, clashing with young heroes such as Young Justice and becoming a reoccurring foe of several mystical heroes in the DC Universe, including Etrigan the Demon. Following DC Rebirth, several revisions to the character were introduced, making him an adversary of Nabu (and by extension, the modern Doctor Fate) as one of the Lords of Chaos.

Klarion has been adapted in media, having made several appearances, notably in animated television series. Most notably, the character appeared as a recurring antagonist in Young Justice, voiced by Thom Adcox-Hernandez, depicted as a powerful and immortal Lord of Chaos who frequently feuds with Doctor Fate. Elements of this portrayal were later incorporated into the comics incarnation, with Klarion becoming a Lord of Chaos. Klarion also made appearances in The New Batman Adventures and Justice League Action, voiced by Stephen Wolfe Smith and Noel Fisher respectively.

== Fictional character biography ==
Klarion as he originally appeared in The Demon #7 (March 1973). Art by Jack Kirby.

=== Kirby's Klarion ===
Klarion is a young practitioner of the dark arts from "Witch World", an otherworldly dimension where everyone has some degree of aptitude in magic. A child prodigy, Klarion is constrained and limited by the adults in his life who consider him too immature for the natural talents he possesses. Frustrated, Klarion uses a ritual to permanently cross over to Earth with his cat familiar Teekl to practice magic freely. He attracts the attention of the demon Etrigan, who attempts to send him back to Witch World several times and becomes his rival.

=== David's Klarion ===
Klarion appears in the 2000 event Young Justice: Sins of Youth, in which he is involved in a plot by the Agenda to turn the public against the metahuman community, targeting juvenile super-heroes as the weakest link in the chain. He increases distrust and confusion at a rally for young heroes by casting a spell that swaps the ages of the teenage and adult heroes in attendance.

Peter David's version of Klarion also appears in July–June 2000's Young Justice #20- "Time Out" and #21 "Young, Just Us Too". In these issues, he expresses loneliness after turning various villains into children during the "Sins of Youth" storyline and wishes for a playmate of his own age before eventually befriending Ariella Kent, the Supergirl of the 853rd century.

=== Morrison's Klarion ===
In 2005, a new version of Klarion starred in his own mini-series as one of the seven main characters in Grant Morrison's Seven Soldiers. Morrison described this character as a return to the original Kirby version with some updates, including the return of Klarion's original overall look and the removal of changes made to the character's personality by David. Klarion's backstory is retconned to have him instead be an inhabitant of "Limbotown", an underground community beneath New York City whose citizens are descended from Puritan witches and the Sheeda-King Mr. Melmoth. Klarion attempts to leave Limbotown and stops Melmoth from pillaging it.

=== Countdown ===
In Countdown to Final Crisis, Klarion encounters Mary Marvel, who has been given Black Adam's powers and is struggling to control them. As Mary is unaware of Klarion's chaotic nature, he tricks her into transferring to him some of her new power, claiming that he can teach her to control it. Despite his magic being greatly augmented, Mary is able to defeat Klarion.

In Brightest Day, Klarion is possessed by Alan Scott's Starheart power and driven insane. After wreaking havoc throughout an urban area, he is tracked down and defeated by Jade and Donna Troy.

=== Superman/Batman Sorcerer Kings ===
Klarion plays a major role in the events of the Sorcerer Kings three-issue storyline in Superman/Batman. He appears on the final page of issue #82, and in issue #83 he leads the current-timeline Batman, Doctor Occult and Detective Chimp to the "witches' road". In addition, Klarion's future self appears as a member of the Justice League on a magic-controlled Earth.

=== Batgirl (vol. 3) ===
Klarion's last appearance before The New 52 was in Chalk (heart) Outline, a Valentine's Day themed story in Batgirl volume 3, #18. Klarion and Stephanie Brown as Batgirl must stop Teekl's rampage, which involves a trip to Limbotown.

=== New 52 onwards ===
Following the New 52 reboot towards DC's mainstream continuity, Klarion was reintroduced in a self-titled solo series in 2014. Now high-schooled aged (between 14 and 16 years old), the teen warlock attempts to escape an abusive upbringing in the hidden dimension of Limbotown, and winds up stranded in New York City. He joins a group of fellow runaways living in a museum under the care of an older sorceress, Piper. She agrees to help mentor Klarion in magic so he can defeat a tech-wizard.

In DC Rebirth, Klarion would also later join the Night Force alongside Raven, Traci Thirteen, and Zach Zatara under Baron Winters to battle supernatural threats, including the magic-hunting Shadow-Riders. Eventually, he becomes corrupted by his vast powers and joins Circe's Injustice League Dark, battling the Justice League Dark as Circe attempts to gather the remaining pieces of Hecate's magic and using her newfound magical power to shift the hierarchy of the mystical cosmology in her favor. Partnered with Solomon Grundy, Klarion bewitches Man-Bat as part of a covert strike against the JLD and briefly battled Khalid Nassour. When Circe's plan begins to fall apart from Wonder Woman's intervention and Eclipso's presence. Klarion is later captured by Amanda Waller and A.R.G.U.S. and is drafted into Waller's Suicide Squad Black using Teekl's captivity to coerce him. Alongside the members, he is pitted against Sebastian Faust, warlock and former A.R.G.U.S. director of its mystic counterpart who embraced extremism and seeks to destroy magic to cure his dryad wife of a magical disease.

Klarion later appears during the events of Dark Crisis, having allied with Deathstroke's Dark Army and become a Lord of Chaos.

== Characterization ==
A supernatural character, Klarion is considered one of the most dangerous magic users in creation and eventually ascended to being a Lord of Chaos. He is also characterized by a dark yet childish sense of humor, whose antics can be considered as alternatively being whimsical, spiteful, malevolent, petulant, and unpredictable, enjoying causing others pain and discomfort. Alternatively, he has been portrayed with more heroic or anti-heroic traits stemming from his abusive treatment from his mentors in Limbotown.

As an adversary for various superheroes in the DC Universe, Klarion is chiefly an antagonist of Etrigan. Following DC Rebirth and influenced by his media portrayals, he is also an adversary of the modern Doctor Fate and Nabu due to their affiliation with the Lords of Order. He also has several love interests; Zell, a witch whose powers revolved around her hair (in reference to Rapunzel) and serves him as well as Raven, whom she met previously in the Night Force.

=== Design and appearance ===
Klarion's appearance has also changed over time; his appearances in stories such as The Demon and Young Justice comic resembles a young, light-skinned human child . Over time, this appearance later changes, giving him an otherworldly dark-blue skin tone. After the New 52 reboot, the character showcased the power to shift between appearance, the latter being his true form and the other to blend in with humanity. Klarion is also stated to be high-school aged as opposed to a child in older appearances, being between fourteen and sixteen years old in age.

== Powers and abilities ==
Klarion possess nearly limitless magical abilities such as being able to transform himself, travel into other dimensions, energy projection, shapeshifting, divination, telekinesis, etc. He also has a plethora of knowledge of various magic and spells. Over time, his magical powers have been tied to both wicca and black magic, which utilize specific hand-gestures and voice pitch when performing magic. He also eventually ascended as a practitioner of chaos magic. His powers are tied to his cat familiar Teekl, who possesses a psychic link with him, links him to the physical plane, and can transform into an anthropomorphic form.

His reliance on Teekl is also his primary weakness; as he genuinely cares for her, his opponents often resort to threatening or attacking Teekl to best him. His remarkable abilities are also limited by youth and inexperience, and he has been defeated by older, more powerful magic wielders (i.e. Sebastian Faust).

== Other versions ==
- Klarieene, a heroic gender-swapped version of Klarion, appears in The Multiversity.
- An alternate universe version of Klarion appears in Flashpoint. He is a member of the Secret Seven before seemingly killing himself, though it is suspected that Shade, the Changing Man killed him while under the M-Vest's control.
- Klarion appears in Batman: Lil Gotham.

== In other media ==
=== Television ===
Klarion as he appears in The New Batman Adventures.

- Klarion the Witch Boy and Teekl appear in The New Batman Adventures episode "The Demon Within", with the former voiced by Stephen Wolfe Smith.
- Klarion the Witch Boy and Teekl appear in Young Justice, voiced by Thom Adcox-Hernandez and Dee Bradley Baker respectively. This version is a Lord of Chaos and member of the Light who has a history with Vandal Savage.
- Klarion the Witch Boy and Teekl appear in Justice League Action, with the former voiced by Noel Fisher.

=== Video games ===
- Klarion the Witch Boy appears in DC Universe Online, voiced by Pablo Thiel.
- Klarion the Witch Boy appears in Young Justice: Legacy, voiced again by Thom Adcox-Hernandez.
- Klarion the Witch Boy appears as a character summon in Scribblenauts Unmasked: A DC Comics Adventure.
- Klarion the Witch Boy appears as a playable character in Lego DC Super-Villains, voiced again by Thom Adcox-Hernandez.

=== Miscellaneous ===
- Klarion the Witch Boy appears in Cartoon Monsoon, voiced by Tara Strong.
- Klarion the Witch Boy appears in All-New Batman: The Brave and the Bold #12.
- Klarion the Witch Boy appears in the Injustice: Gods Among Us prequel comic. Batman and John Constantine recruit him to join their "Insurgency" against High Councilor Superman's Regime. Klarion is subsequently killed by Sinestro while tracking Regime member Raven.
- Klarion the Witch Boy appears in Justice League Beyond. He joins forces with several magic-users to assist the Justice League in fighting Brainiac.
