= Doctor Fate (comic book) =

American comic book series

- Logo used in the 2015 Doctor Fate series.

Publication information
- Publisher: DC Comics
- Schedule: Monthly
- Format: Limited series Ongoing series
- Genre: Superhero; Supernatural
- No. of issues: Main series: 3 (Immortal Dr. Fate limited series); 4 (1988 limited series); 42 (1988 ongoing series); 5 (2004 limited series); 18 (2015 ongoing series); Spin-offs: 22 (Fate ongoing series); 12 (Book of Fate ongoing series)
- Main character(s): Doctor Fate (Kent Nelson); Doctor Fate (Khalid Nassour); Nabu the Wise

Doctor Fate (also known as Dr. Fate, Immortal Doctor Fate, and Fate) is a series of American comic books published by DC Comics, featuring the superhero of the same name. Since its debut in 1985, various series introduced different incarnations of the character and has undergone multiple relaunches throughout its publication history, aiming to reinvent the character for contemporary audiences.

== Publication history ==
Starting in 1985, DC Comics compiled various Doctor Fate stories into a three-issue limited series titled "The Immortal Doctor Fate" The collection included the Doctor Fate back-up stories from The Flash, which featured a retelling of Doctor Fate's origin by Paul Levitz, Joe Staton, and Michael Nasser. The series also included the Pasko/Simonson Doctor Fate story from 1st Issue Special #9, as well as a Doctor Fate tale from More Fun Comics #56, originally published in June 1940. This limited series served as a compilation of these diverse Doctor Fate stories, providing readers with a comprehensive exploration of the character's history and adventures.

In 1988, the first limited series of Doctor Fate was released. The series was written by J. M. DeMatteis and illustrated by Keith Giffen and Dave Hunt, introducing the characters Eric and Linda Strauss. In the story, they were chosen to take up the mantle of Doctor Fate following the apparent death of Kent Nelson, the previous Doctor Fate, despite Eric's initial hesitation and Nabu's insistence on Linda's suitability. The series marked the first attempt to revitalize the character by introducing the concept of legacies, exploring the idea of passing on the mantle of Doctor Fate to a new generation, which involved the demise of the Kent Nelson character.

After the release of the limited series in 1989, an ongoing series was launched, continuing the narrative from the previous limited series. Initially, the series focused on the incarnations of Eric and Linda Strauss, the successors of Doctor Fate, until their characters were killed off in the storyline leading up to the 23rd issue. Following their departure, the series shifted its focus to Inza Cramer and Kent Nelson, who returned from the dead within the story. Inza primarily assumed the role of Doctor Fate for the remainder of the series until its cancellation. The latter half of the series explored Inza's unique approach to being a superhero, as both characters faced the challenges of rebuilding their social lives in rejuvenated bodies.

Between 1994 and 1996, DC Comics released the Fate series as part of the Zero Hour: Crisis in Time! event. The character of Doctor Fate, portrayed by Jared Stevens in this iteration, underwent a significant redesign. He abandoned the "Doctor" title and acquired new weapons crafted from previous artifacts associated with Doctor Fate. Instead of being a traditional sorcerer, the character was reimagined as a demon hunter. Both Kent Nelson and Inza Cramer were killed off in the series. This reinterpretation of Doctor Fate received negative feedback from readers and critics. As a result, the series was canceled after 23 issues in September 1996. Subsequently, the character appeared in the twelve-issue series called The Book of Fate, written by Keith Giffen. Published from February 1997 to January 1998 under DC's "Weirdoverse" imprint, The Book of Fate provided a rebooted origin and new adventures for the character. Following the cancellation of The Book of Fate in 1998, Doctor Fate underwent yet another reimagination with the revival of the Justice Society in JSA. In the title, Jared Stevens was killed off.

In 2003, a new Doctor Fate limited series was launched, featuring the Hector Hall version of the character, who had previously made his debut in the JSA series. The storyline followed Hector as he embraced his role as the new Doctor Fate under the guidance of Nabu. Set in Salem, Hector faced off against a formidable adversary named "The Curse," an ancient and powerful sorcerer who posed a threat to the Doctor Fate legacy. The Curse resurfaced in the modern world through a host named Justin Guilder, who also competed for the affections of Caitlin, Hector's love interest. Throughout the limited series, Hector also receives support from a Wicca coven in his battle against The Curse.

Following the conclusion of the Convergence limited series in June 2015 and the launch of DC's "DC You" line, a new Doctor Fate ongoing series was introduced. Written by Paul Levitz and illustrated by Sonny Liew, the series centered around the latest incarnation of Doctor Fate, Khalid Nassour, an Egyptian-American medical student. Levitz explained that DC wanted to provide a fresh perspective on the character compared to the original iteration created by Gardner Fox during the Golden Age, as per the vision of Dan DiDio and Jim Lee. The series ran for 18 issues from June 2015 to November 2016.

In 2022, Tom King and Mitch Gerads initially proposed a new Doctor Fate series. However, DC Comics decided against the idea and instead encouraged them to concentrate on projects related to Batman.

== Print media ==
=== Ongoing comic book series ===
==== Doctor Fate (1988-1992) ====
Issue	Publication date	Plot
#1-#24, Annual #1	Dec, 1988 - Jan, 1991	After Eric and Linda Strauss become Doctor Fate, the pair is trained in the mystic arts by Nabu, who has since inhabit the deceased body of Kent Nelson to learn more about humanity. With assistance from sidekicks, lawyer Jack C. Small and Petey the Demon (disguised as an "ugly dog"), the Strauss family and Nabu engage in strange adventures that pits them against powerful adversaries of the Lords of Chaos and Wotan, odd foes such as minor sorcerer Joachim Hesse, finds the mantle of Doctor Fate falling out of favor with the Lords of Order, and the pair must contend with the trauma inflicted on them by Eric's deceased father. During a battle with Darkseid (revealed to be a disguised DeSaad in retroactive stories), Eric is killed in battle but learns of his reincarnation cycle and connection with Linda. The strain of being Doctor Fate weighs in on Linda, eventually killing her but Eric and Linda live on in new lives while Kent Nelson and Inza Cramer are brought from the dead in younger bodies.
#25-41	Feb, 1991 - Jun, 1992	Due to unusual circumstances, Inza Cramer becomes the sole Doctor Fate. While grappling with her sorcerous powers for the betterment of their local neighborhood in New York City, the pair contends with renegade Lord of Order, Shat-Ru, who has since taken residence in Kent Nelson's old body used previously by Nabu. Kent works to re-establish himself as an Archeology Teaching Assistant and advises Inza while she not only battles various mystic foes but also the potential moral ramifications of her usage of magic, which also causes friction between the pair. It is later Inza was unwittingly an agent for the Lords of Chaos, supplying her with the chaos magic. Inza is also thrusted into a conflict with Congress following the Lords of Chaos outing their identities and Nelson is re-empowered with a different helm, the pair now working alongside one another.

==== Fate (1994 - 1996) ====
Issue	Publication date	Plot
#0-22	Aug, 1994 - July, 1996	Jared Stevens, a former smuggler, finds himself chosen unwittingly as the new incarnation of Doctor Fate while hunting for the famed artifacts of Fate. After the deaths of Kent Nelson and Inza Cramer following an encounter with demons representing the demonic entity known as Kingdom. Rejecting Nabu's attempt to supplant his will, he suffers horrific injuries that grants him powers over the forces of order and chaos. Radically re-defining the role, he opts to call himself "Fate", reconfigures the Helmet of Fate into a golden knife, and operates as a demon hunter and an agent of balance. As he navigates his new role in fighting demonic forces with the help of occultism and computer expert Arnold Burnsteel, he also becomes a person of interest in the magical community, represented in the form of "The Conclave".
Creative team
John Francis Moore, Steven Grant, Len Kaminski (writers)Anthony Williams (illustrator), Andy Lanning, Martin Griffiths, Sean Hardy, Anthony Williams (inkers), Mike Danza (colorist)

==== Doctor Fate (2015-2016) ====
Issue	Publication date	Plot
Sneak Peak: Doctor Fate #1, #1-7	May, 2015 - Dec, 2015	Khalid Nassour, a Brooklyn-born Egyptian-American and medical student, is selected by the goddess Bastet to assume the mantle of Doctor Fate. Endowed with magical powers from the Helmet of Fate, Khalid is guided by Nabu and the gods to battle Anubis, who seeks to reshape the world according to his whims. Struggling to accept his newfound powers and responsibilities as Earth's mystic defender, Khalid is hesitant but embraces his role to safeguard the world from destruction.
#8-12	Jan, 2016 - May, 2–2016	Following his victory over Anubis, Khalid continues to face the ongoing challenge of balancing his dual life, guided by both the gods and archangels alike. However, a confrontation with the United Nations and an Egyptian general whom is secretly a necromancer draws the new, younger incarnation to his family's ancestral homeland, where he also battles the ghost of Julius Caesar brought back by the aforementioned general. At the conclusion of the story, Khalid also meets Kent Nelson, who is revealed to be his great-uncle.
#13-18	Jun, 2016 - Nov, 2016	Khalid begins being mentored by his granduncle. Together, the pair thwarts various threats from afreets, the undead in the form of mummies, and the vengeful Osiris who seeks Khalid for disrupting Anubis's place within the cosmic hierarchy, unaware of the god's deceitful plan. In another challenge, Khalid battles the being known as Clothorus, a supernatural creature with power over the fates of others despite lacking a divine mandate, setting her sights on Akila.
Creative team
Paul Levitz (author), Inaki Miranda (illustrator), Brendan McCarthy (illustrator), Ibrahim Moustafa (illustrator), Sonny Liew (illustrator),

=== Limited comic book series ===
==== Doctor Fate (1987) ====
Issue	Publication date	Plot
#1-#4	July, 1987 - October, 1987	Kent Nelson, who had been Doctor Fate for four decades, wanes due to his aging body. Kent and Nabu chooses ten-year-old Eric Strauss, who is magically matured and becomes the new Doctor Fate, tasked with battling the Lords of Chaos and their agent, Benjamin Stoner. Eric and Linda, Eric's stepmother who was also chosen as a vessel of Doctor Fate, confront Anti-Fate, secure the Helmet of Fate, and emerge victorious. Kent discovers that the original Doctor Fate role involved two merging vessels, but this requirement was abandoned by Nabu for better control over him. Kent dies, leaving Linda and Eric as the new Doctor Fate.
Creative team
Christopher Golden (writer), Don Kramer (penciler)_{,} John Kalisz, Heroic Age (colorists), Kurt Hathaway (letterer), Peter Tomasi, Stephen Wacker (editors)

==== Doctor Fate (2003) ====
Issue	Publication date	Plot
#1-5	Oct, 2003 - Feb, 2004	An age-old adversary of Nabu, The Curse, reappears for revenge and chooses a new vessel in the form of Justin Guilder, an envious criminal who seeks to kill the newly chosen Hector Hall to secure the affections of a woman both men share feelings for. As Hector battles the Curse, his demonic forces, and is assisted by a Wicca coven, he sets to prove himself to his doubtful mentor who believes the Curse to be too powerful of an opponent for him to handle.
Creative team
Christopher Golden (writer), Don Kramer (penciler)_{,} John Kalisz, Heroic Age (colorists), Kurt Hathaway (letterer), Peter Tomasi, Stephen Wacker (editors)

=== Collected editions ===
Title	Material collected	Release date	ISBN	Ref.
Dr. Fate: Countdown to Mystery	Countdown to Mystery (2007 - 2008) #1-4	September 3, 2008	1401218407	
Doctor Fate Vol. 1: The Blood Price	Doctor Fate (2015) #1-7, DC Sneak Peek: Doctor Fate #1	October 3, 2017	978-1401261214	
Doctor Fate Vol. 2: Prisoners of the Past	Doctor Fate (2015) #8-12	June 26, 2018	978-1401264925	
Doctor Fate Vol. 3: Fateful Threads	Doctor Fate (2015) #13-18	June 26, 2018	978-1401272418	

==== Immortal Doctor Fate (1985) ====
Title	Materials collected	Publication date	ISBN	Plot
The Immortal Doctor Fate	1st Issue Special #9, The Flash #306-313, Dr. Fate #1-4 and DC Challenge #11	March 29, 2016	140125876X	Containing various stories and adventures taking place after Kent Nelson becomes Doctor Fate, Nelson battles various adversaries such as Wotan, Totec, Khalis, Vandaemon, and Ynar. Meanwhile, Nelson also struggles as Nabu's control over him strains his marriage of Inza, who becomes increasingly lonely and frustrated with his dual life and Nabu. In his older years, his power wanes and must select a new successor: Eric and Linda Strauss.
Creative team
Martin Pasko, J.M. DeMatteis (author), Keith Giffen, Dave Hunt (illustrators), Anthony Tollin (colorist)

== Reception ==
The Immortal Doctor Fate series, which included the original re-printing of the comics (not to be confused with the collected edition), is highly regarded as one of the character's most popular runs, as noted by Wizard Magazine. Charli Snow of CBR ranked the 1987 Dr. Fate limited series 10th in the "10 Best DC Comics Starring Doctor Fate". The 2015 Doctor Fate series starring Khalid Nassour also received positive reception, in particular to the character legitimatizing Doctor Fate's connection to Egyptian mythology due to his heritage, being the first Muslim character to star in a solo series in DC Comics, and being regarded as the longest running title under the DC You imprint. CBR also praised the series for its storytelling, visuals, accessibility, characterization of both Khalid and Nabu, and ranked second in the "10 Best DC Comics Starring Doctor Fate".

=== Criticisms ===
Throughout its publication years, the Doctor Fate comic book series has faced various criticisms, which have contributed to its tendency to experience early cancellations and poor sales. According to a Wizard Magazine article, the late writer Steve Gerber expressed his retrospective belief that previous Doctor Fate series suffered from a lack of clear definition regarding the character's abilities and the source of his power. Gerber also noted that the character had been taken in numerous directions and undergone multiple incarnations, resulting in confusion for readers. Additionally, writer William Messner-Loebs mentioned that despite his enjoyment of writing for the series, it experienced limited sales. The Fate series is generally regarded as the least popular run of the Doctor Fate character. This particular iteration of Doctor Fate, featuring the Jared Stevens incarnation and a significant redesign that leaned towards a demon hunter archetype, received negative reviews. The departure from traditional elements associated with the character necessitated a reboot of the character's background, origin, and abilities the Book of Fate series.

== See also ==
- Countdown to Mystery
- List of Justice Society titles
- New Talent Showcase
- 1st Issue Special
