= Nabu (DC Comics) =

- Nabu as depicted in Justice League (vol. 4) #73 (May 2022). Art by Szymon Kudranski, Emanuela Lupacchino, Wade Von Grawbadger, and Scott Hanna.

Publication information
- Publisher: DC Comics
- First appearance: More Fun Comics #67 (May 1941)
- Created by: Gardner Fox; Howard Sherman

In-story information
- Alter ego: Nabu
- Species: Cosmic being
- Place of origin: Cilia
- Team affiliations: Lords of Order
- Partnerships: Thoth; Hawkman; Black Adam; Doctor Fate (various)
- Notable aliases: Nabu the Wise; Doctor Fate; Kent Nelson
- Abilities: Immortality; Mastery of magic and supernatural knowledge

Altered in-story information for adaptations to other media
- Team affiliations: Justice League; Justice Society of America
- Partnerships: Zatara; Zatanna; Khalid Nassour; Traci Thurston
- Notable aliases: Doctor Fate; Earth's Sorcerer Supreme

Nabu (also known as Nabu the Wise) is a fictional deity in American comic books published by DC Comics. An adaptation of the eponymous Mesopotamian patron god, the character was adapted by Gardner Fox and Howard Sherman, first appearing in More Fun Comics #67 (May, 1941). Featuring various departures from Babylonian mythology, Nabu is a major supporting and recurring character in Doctor Fate titles.

A cosmic entity among the Lords of Order with varying origins, he is often a dissident and fierce personality among his brethren with an obsession with defeating chaos at any costs. He is the creator of the Helmet of Fate and progenitor of the sorcerous Doctor Fate line in the 20th century after tiring his human form fighting evil and aiding ancient Egyptian deities. His first agent was archaeologist Kent Nelson whom he manipulated, often supplanting his agency and will with his own. Nabu would continue being a significant presence among several incarnations of Doctor Fate such as Eric and Linda Strauss, Hector Hall, and Khalid Nassour.

The character has appeared in various incarnations across multiple forms of media.

== Publication history ==
Nabu first appeared in More Fun Comics #67 (May 1941) and was created by Gardner Fox and Howard Sherman.

== Fictional character biography ==
=== Pre-Crisis on Infinite Earths ===
==== Kent Nelson: Doctor Fate I ====
In 1920, archaeologist Sven Nelson and his son Kent go on an expedition to the Valley of Ur. While exploring a temple discovered by his father, Kent opens the tomb of Nabu the Wise and revives him from suspended animation, accidentally releasing a poisonous gas which kills Sven. Nabu takes pity on Kent, telling him of his origin from Cilia and teaches him the skills of a sorcerer over the next twenty years before giving him a mystical helmet, amulet, and cloak.

Several revisions would changed aspects of Nabu's connection to Kent's origin: More details are later revealed, with Nabu having erased twelve year old Kent's grief over his father's death to make him more controllable in learning the mystic arts from him. A much later revision by Paul Levitz's in 1978 alternatively depicting Nabu as a callous cosmic being who sought to use young Kent, aging him to adulthood and imparted into him his mystical knowledge in the process.

Over the course of fifteen years since Kent Nelson became the sorcerous hero Doctor Fate, Nabu had supplanting control of his body and will with his own while Kent bore the helm, a fact caught by Inza Cramer, his host's girlfriend and later wife. While battling foes such as Khalis and requiring Inza's aid at times, a martial rift forms between Kent and Inza due to the latter's frustration with Nabu's presence and envy of Kent's Doctor Fate duties taking precedent. After a one villain weaponizes her envy and two others, being renegades Lords of Chaos and Order, requires her presence and the rift between the pair nearly causes infidelity on her part, Nabu allows the pair to begin mending their marriage and initiates a merge between him, Kent, and Inza to formulate a powerful new Doctor Fate transformation that both defeats the renegade Lords and grants Inza a higher understanding of the role of Doctor Fate.

In 1985, Doctor Fate (with Nabu influence) later appears in the Marv Wolfman and George Pérez's Crisis on Infinite Earths crossover series, merging both Earth-1 and Earth-2 realities within the multiverse altering event, with all past definitive histories having been said to happen on this composite universe ("Earth").

=== Post-Crisis on Infinite Earths ===
Following Crisis on Infinite Earths, Nabu's characterization and history is revised, having Doctor Fate's earlier appearances (More Fun Comics #55), his origin story (More Fun Comics #67, 1st Issue Special #9, DC Special Series #10), and all his backup stories in The Flash (#306-313) are considered definitive adventures and stories for the character whereas Silver Age stories were no longer considered canonical to his new universe. Nabu's origins and early history is also revised throughout titles, now a cosmic being among his brethren created by ultimate creator of the DC Universe, the Presence.

==== Revised background and origin ====
Haling from Cilia, he developed a fierce and a obsessive personality against the forces of chaos, he is exiled to Earth and has used a human host body since the dawn of human civilization. Becoming more prominent during the emergence of Sumer and the subsequent ancient Egypt civilization, Nabu was a chief wielder of magic and protector whose exploits centered on battling the forces of chaos and evil while laying the foundations for what would eventually cumulate to the foundation of Doctor Fate.

In ancient Egypt, Nabu served as a prominent wielder of magic while posing as an Egyptian court magician and adviser for pharaohs; In 2578 BC, he helps Time Master Bonnie Baxter seal away the Pharaoh Khafre, an identity of Vandal Savage. During the rule of Ramses II he encountered the Spectre, whom utterly defeated him and unleashed what was later known as the Plagues of Egypt detailed in the Books of Exodus despite his best efforts. Eventually wounded from centuries of combat in his human form, Nabu places himself in suspended animation to heal in an ancient tomb for thousands of years.

==== Doctor Fate II: Eric and Linda Strauss ====
Shortly after Kent becomes a founding member of the Justice League International and assists in defeating the Gray Man, Nabu selects a new successor as Doctor Fate when an aged Kent becomes less capable in dealing with threats originating from the Lords of Chaos due to his advanced aging. Selecting Eric Strauss and aging him to adulthood, Kent learns of Nabu's manipulation in ensuring mental compliance when he finds out Doctor Fate was meant to be merging of two vessels into one, powerful sorcerous being which eclipsed him in power. Eric and Linda eventually defeat usurper Dr. Benjamin Stone, enthralled by the Lord of Chaos Typphon, and assumes the Doctor Fate mantle. Nabu goes on to possess Kent's corpse in order to personally advise them while learning to understand human life, exiled once again by his brethren when he revealed his intentions in experiencing a human life. The three of them are soon joined by a friendly demon called Petey and lawyer Jack C. Small.

The three of them are soon joined by a friendly demon called Petey and lawyer Jack C. Small. Eventually, Eric is killed on Apokolips during a battle with DeSaad, forcing Linda to become Doctor Fate on her own for a brief tenure. Linda is killed shortly afterwards by the Lords of Chaos. Eric and Linda's souls are reincarnated in the bodies of Eugene and Wendy DiBellia while Nabu reincarnates in Eugene and Wendy's unborn child.

==== Encounter with Jared Stevens ====
In 1994, the Fate series introduces Jared Stevens as a chosen successor of Doctor Fate. Unlike Kent, Jared explicitly rejects Nabu's attempt to control him and circumstances leads to the artifacts reconfiguring themselves. Due to Jared's absorption of the Amulet of Anubis's power, he is unable to control him. He is later tried for his actions as a Lord of Order and treatment of his previous bearers by the Lords of Chaos and Order, the latter faction having found his extremism ironically aiding chaos and thus punished him by making him a Lord of Chaos, an act Nabu believed to be humiliating.

When Stevens' origin was rebooted in 1997 by Keith Giffen, Doctor Fate's history was revised once more with Inza having now been a incarnation of Doctor Fate under Nabu at some undefined point of time after the original Doctor Fate ongoing series ended. Also holding a brief tenure, Inza's mental state was compromised due to a lack of training and the Nelsons resolved to trick the new incarnation, Jared Stevens, into the role of Doctor Fate so he they ascend to the afterlife. Like prior, Jared rejects Nabu and similarly reconfigures the artifacts into a knife, bandaged arm, and has a ankh tattoo before using the codename "Fate".

==== Hector Hall: Doctor Fate IV ====
In the 2003 Doctor Fate series, Nabu becomes the patron of Hector Hall, a reincarnation of Hawkman's son chosen as the new bearer of the Doctor Fate mantle. Guiding the novice sorcerer, a foe from Nabu's past, the Curse, re-emerges and takes Justin Guilder as his host. Although doubting Hector's abilities to be sufficient to battle him, he continuously goads at Hector in an attempt to get him to rebuke his criticisms, which cumulates for Hector to gain enough confidence to battle and defeat the Curse.

Later, during the "Princes of Darkness" storyline, as Mordru's manipulations of Hector surface following the reveal of Dawn Granger was enchanted to appear as Fury and comatose mystically, Nabu appears in the Amulet of Anubis alongside the other "spirits" of past Doctor Fates within it, revealing them to be facsimiles created by Hector's imagination as a result of yearning to be accepted as a legitimate inheritor of the Doctor Fate legacy. He witness Hector later defeat Mordru and imprison him within the Rock of Eternity.

==== Death ====
Eventually, Nabu came into conflict with the Spectre when he began hunting down and killing other Lords of Chaos and Order. In Infinite Crisis, Alexander Luthor Jr. revealed that he had sent Superboy-Prime to recover the black diamond and that the Psycho-Pirate delivered it to Jean Loring on Alex's orders and had Eclipso-Loring manipulate the Spectre by convincing him magic was an abomination to God and into breaking down magic into its more raw energy form, in which doing so killed the Lords of Chaos and Order in the process. In doing so, Alexander could use them for his own ends. After killing other Lords of Order including the Wizard Shazam, Nabu was the last one to face him. Nabu put up a valiant fight against the Spectre but knew he would lose this battle and instead, opted to fight at a level for the Presence to take notice. Fatally injured but ultimately stopping the Spectre. Nabu, in his final act, passed his Helm of Fate to Detective Chimp and tasked him to find one worthy of the mantle. With his death, the 9th Age of Magic had ended and the 10th Age of Magic begun.

=== New 52 onward ===
In 2011, "The New 52" rebooted the DC universe. This new iteration of Nabu featured more alterations to his origin story, characterization, and background in an attempt to revitalize the Doctor Fate character once more in preparation for a newer incarnation of the Doctor Fate character.

==== Revised background and origins ====
In the Doctor Fate series, Nabu's earlier history attributed him to being a servant of Thoth, who created the Helmet of Fate and designated Nabu as the spirit within. The reasons behind this choice are unknown, but Nabu's role was to assist the chosen champion of the Egyptian pantheon, Doctor Fate. However, an alternative origin was later presented for Nabu in this revised continuity. It depicted his rise to becoming a member of the Lords of Order from a mortal existence. This transformation occurred as a result of his interactions with Hecate, a deity who had suffered abuse from fellow sorcerers, including the notable future practitioner of dark magic, Mordru. As a consequence of the inherent dangers of magic, Nabu's spirit eventually came to reside within the Helmet of Fate as his body deteriorated. While this alternative origin restores his status as the Helm's primary intelligence, it diverges from the traditional depiction of the Lords of Order as ancient energy beings.

In the early history of ancient Egypt, champions were chosen by Egyptian deities to act as supernatural defenders and were gifted the Helmet of Fate, whom Nabu possessed as a human host body. Over time, however, Nabu's power were eventually consolidated into the helm itself.^AUsing one of his champion hosts, he once had a confrontation with Khaji-Da, who was in league with Arion. Defeating the technological scarab, it escapes and Nabu battles the insane Arion and defeats him before sealing him away.

==== Khalid Nassour: All-New Doctor Fate ====
In the Doctor Fate series, Nabu assumes a new role as a guide and mentor to Khalid Nassour, the new Doctor Fate. Nabu assists the inexperienced Khalid in his battles against various adversaries, including Anubis, a necromancer, and the spirit of Julius Caesar. Additionally, Nabu imparts crucial information to Khalid, as well supports Kent Nelson when he resurfaces in Khalid's life after discovering Khalid's destiny as the next Doctor Fate. Nabu is portrayed as a deceased spirit who often communicates in cryptic ways, which frustrates the young Doctor Fate. At times, Khalid dismisses Nabu, likening him to an annoying Jinn. For a period, Kent Nelson resumed the Doctor Fate mantle while training Khalid Nassour, but Nabu trapped Kent in mystic stasis. Nabu then assumed the role of Doctor Fate, using Kent's connection to manifest through the Helm of Fate. Nabu clashed with Blue Beetle and his scarab Khaji-Da, orchestrated by their shared adversary, Arion. Kent eventually regained control, defeated Arion, and continued training Khalid.

In Justice League Dark, Nabu betrays Kent Nelson, taking control of his body and imprisoning Khalid Nassour. Nabu's goal is to eradicate magic and sacrifice the magical community to eliminate the threat of the Upside-Down Man and Hecate. Khalid, Kent, and the Justice League Dark unite to counter Nabu and Hecate, ultimately leading to Nabu giving the mantle of Doctor Fate to Khalid. With Nabu's help, Khalid battles Circe, the Injustice League Dark, restores balance to the elemental Parliaments, and faces the Upside-Down Man. Both Nabu and Kent make sacrifices to aid the team. Though surviving, Nabu is no longer the primary intelligence in the Helmet of Fate. Throughout the series, Nabu's manipulative nature is evident, but he gradually learns from his mistakes and gains respect from Khalid. Kent becomes cautious about trusting Nabu, while supporting Khalid as Doctor Fate. Some time before the battle with Upside-Down Man, Nabu assists Khalid and Superman in battling Xanadoth, a former leader of the Lords of Chaos. After parting ways with Khalid following the fight with Upside-Down, Nabu reappears briefly to help defeat Xanadoth once more alongside the Justice League and Justice League Dark.

Eventually, Hauhet replaces Nabu as the patron spirit of the Helmet of Fate. Future State hints at a connection between Nabu and Hauhet, with Hauhet being an older being who considers herself wiser.

== Characterization ==
The spiritual guide and power source of Doctor Fate residing in the Helmet of Fate, Nabu is a major supporting character whom is considered among the most powerful of the Lords of Order. He is characterized as often being the catalyst of the original versions' most reoccurring conflict of the gradual eroding of his personal agency, impacting his social life and marriage, and is considered an overbearing presence. A variation of this characterization continues with incarnation Hector Hall, alternatively using the disappearance of his wife (whom Nabu himself secretly imprisoned) to exert a level of influence with manipulation without outright supplanting his will.

He is also alternatively given the role of a mentor with versions such as Hector Hall and Eric/Linda Strauss. This role is especially apparent with Khalid Nassour's incarnation in the 2015 series, whose characterized as a spiritual guide described as a "combination of a GPS system and the movie version of Iron Man's J.A.R.V.I.S.", advising Nassour in mystical situations but his vagueness forces him to figure out the situation for himself. In later stories, Nabu's advisory capacities are conventional through unlike prior incarnations, the character favors Nassour and willingly chooses to cede his power to him while letting him retain his agency.

== Powers and abilities ==
Nabu is a powerful wielder of power, possessing an array of super powers such as telepathy, projecting mystical bolts of energy, teleportation, immortality, and more when he is in physical form. As a spiritual guide within the Helmet of Fate, Nabu can commune with incarnations of Doctor Fate, produce visions, levitate, flight, and can use his powers to access computers. He can also possess others at will to use their bodies and bestow a high level of supernatural knowledge derived from his own.

Despite his great level of power, his abilities are explicitly inferior to beings such as the Spectre, whose powers originates from the same force that created the Lords of Chaos and Order. Entities such as Thoth and an chaos-empowered Justice League Dark have also been able to limit his powers and influence on the bearers; the latter imposed a limitation that rendered him unable to utilize a human host without their consent.

== Cultural impact ==
Loosely based on the eponymous major deity in Mesopotamian and Assyrian mythology, Nabu within the DC Universe is typically a supernatural, supporting character known for his manipulative nature in securing hosts through the Helmet of Fate and strict commitment to safeguarding the universe as a Lord of Order, even resorting to morally ambiguous methods. Aspects of this characterization has been criticized by the late Steve Gerber, who opined that it hindered the Doctor Fate's ability to form meaningful connections while Nabu lacked human contact, making him uninteresting to readers.

== In other media ==
- Nabu appears in the Batman: The Brave and the Bold episode "The Fate of Equinox!", voiced by James Arnold Taylor.
- Nabu makes a cameo appearance in flashbacks depicted in Suicide Squad: Hell to Pay.
- Nabu appears in Young Justice, voiced by Kevin Michael Richardson. This version was originally the mortal son of Vandal Savage from ancient Babylon who was killed by Klarion the Witch Boy. Seeking a means to combat the Lords of Chaos following their sinking of Atlantis, the Lords of Order elevate Nabu's soul to their plane of existence and bind him to the Helmet of Fate. Following this, he must anchor himself to Earth via a physical host, completely controlling their bodies in the process.
- Nabu appears as a character summon in Scribblenauts Unmasked: A DC Comics Adventure.
- Nabu appears in Injustice 2, voiced by David Sobolov. He forces Kent Nelson not to interfere with Brainiac's conquest of Earth to maintain balance between order and chaos on the Lords of Order's behalf until Superman crushes the Helmet of Fate.

== Notes ==
The DC Comics Encyclopedia: New Edition states that the champions were known as "Doctor Fate". However, the DC Universe Infinite Encyclopedia also states that those whom possess the helm during the times of ancient Egypt were merely hosts and centuries later, they are named Doctor Fate. This coincides with the 2022 Justice Society of America series with Kent Nelson stating he is the first Doctor Fate although the helm's responsibilities existed for centuries.
