= Mordru =

DC Comics character

- Mordru's design during his appearance in 2018 Justice League Dark series. Design by Pete Woods.

Publication information
- Publisher: DC Comics
- First appearance: Adventure Comics #369 (June 1968)
- Created by: Jim Shooter (writer); Curt Swan (artist)

In-story information
- Alter ego: Wrynn (original); Mordru (current)
- Species: Cosmic entity
- Place of origin: Gemworld
- Team affiliations: Horde; Sons of Anubis; Demon Knights; Legion of Super-Villains; Lords of Chaos
- Partnerships: Eclipso; Obsidian; Child and Flaw
- Notable aliases: The Dark Lord; The Dark Nobleman; Mordru the Merciless; Legionnaire; Prince of Chaos; Golden Age Legionnaire
- Abilities: Extremely powerful practitioner of black magic and chaos magic able to perform virtually any magical feat and possesses extensive knowledge on the supernatural.; Nigh-omnipotence; Nigh-omniscience; Dimensional manipulation; Telepathy; Telekinesis; Superhuman strength, endurance, possession of others, and immortality

Mordru, also known as Mordru the Merciless, is a supervillain featured in American comic books published by DC Comics. Created by writer Jim Shooter and artist Curt Swan, Mordru made his first appearance in Adventure Comics #369 (June 1968).

Originally Wrynn, a scion of a notable family in Gemworld who sought power through black magic, released an entity whom served the Lords of Chaos, Wrynn's mind was overtaken and replaced with a different being who christened himself as Mordru. In later stories, Mordru is revealed to be a parasitic-like cosmic entity who possess hosts. A sorcerer who often seeks to conquer and amplify his already overwhelming level power, he is frequently recognized as one of the most potent evil wielders of magic in the DC Universe, making him an adversary of many characters and teams, including the Justice Society, Amethyst, Doctor Fate, Justice League Dark, and most notably, the futuristic Legion of Super-Heroes.

Mordru's character has been adapted in various media, including television series such as Legion of Super-Heroes and Justice League Unlimited.

== Fictional character biography ==
=== Gemworld ===
Mordru was originally an energy being who possessed Wrynn, one of the twin sons of Lord Topaz and Lady Turquoise. As Wrynn, Mordru studies black magic and accidentally resurrects the golem Flaw, a golem and servant of the Lords of Chaos who chooses him to assist them in retaking Gemworld. Over time, Mordru takes over Wrynn's mind and body and banishes him to his subconscious. After killing Wrynn's brother Donal during a battle with Amethyst, Princess of Gemworld, Mordru is banished from Gemworld and imprisoned inside the planet. Mordru develops taphophobia (the fear of being buried alive), which becomes his "Achilles' heel".

Infinite Crisis erases the Gemworld origin and continues Mordru's post-Crisis battles with Doctor Fate and other super heroes. Instead of possessing Wrynn, Mordru controls the form of sorcerer Arion, and was previously imprisoned in the Rock of Eternity.

=== Pre-Crisis (20th century) ===
Chronologically (in DC Universe time), Mordru's first battle with costumed superheroes occurs during a meeting between Earth-One's Justice League of America and Earth-Two's Justice Society of America. Mordru (who inhabits the Earth-One universe) captures members of the JLA and JSA from the 20th century and forces them to retrieve artifacts to free the Demons Three. During the battle, the Justice League and the Justice Society ally with the Legion of Super-Heroes. His plan fails. There is some loss of continuity following Crisis on Infinite Earths, the battle is restored to continuity by the events of Infinite Crisis, where the Justice League and the Justice Society reside in the same universe.

=== Post-Crisis (20th and 21st centuries) ===
After Crisis on Infinite Earths, Mordru is reimagined as a Lord of Chaos. When the Justice Society face him in the present day, Jack Knight (the current Starman) mentions that he knows of Mordru from his visits to the 30th century, and the android Hourman reveals that he attempted to use his time-manipulation to revert Mordru to a less powerful state but found that Mordru's timeline had no beginning or end, suggesting that he is immortal. Mordru attempts to steal the body and power of Doctor Fate (Hector Hall), but is imprisoned in Fate's amulet. After escaping, Mordru overpowers Fate and steals his collar and amulet. With the aid of Eclipso and Obsidian, Mordru tries to conquer the world, but is defeated by Fate and the Justice Society. Fate imprisons Mordru within the Rock of Eternity, where he is overseen by the wizard Shazam.

After escaping from the Rock of Eternity, Mordru seeks revenge on Fate and the Justice Society. As Mordru and Fate battle, they encounter different timelines, such as the "Kingdom Come" timeline. Fate mocks Mordru, suggesting he is a 'cosmic fluke' and a cancer and that no other versions of him exist. Mordru is defeated by Jakeem Thunder, who places him "somewhere where none of us will see him again".

Mordru battles the JSA and the hostless Nabu in JSA #80, art by Don Kramer.

=== Pre-Zero Hour (30th Century) ===
In the 30th century, Mordru appears on Zerox, the planet of sorcerers, and takes control in a coup. In doing so, he steals the sorcerers' powers, but his apprentice, Mysa Nal (the White Witch) escapes.

Mordru, now known as the "Dark Lord", founds a galactic empire by conquering nearby planets. He combines the technology of the conquered planets with his sorcery. For example, he can jam an enemy's weapons before a space battle. However, Brainiac 5 notices that Mordru is choosing his conquests carefully "as if selecting baubles from a jeweller's tray", suggesting his power has wavered. In a large space battle, the Legion defeats Mordru's armada. Mordru fights back by appearing as a hundred-foot armored giant. After he defeats the Legion, he reverts to his normal stature to rejoice in his victory, failing to notice that Mon-El and Superboy were not present during the fight. The two seal him in an airless vault which is placed beneath Legion Headquarters.

While exploring the headquarters, Shadow Lass finds Mordru's vault and opens the outer door. While trying to open the main door, she is interrupted by Mon-El, who warns Shadow Lass and shuts the vault. He opens an outer glass window which lets them see safely inside, but they see Mordru is revived and coming thru the vault side. Mon-El sounds the alarm and Superboy tries to reach him but is rendered unconscious by Mordru, who has not yet regained his full strength. The Legion flee through a Time Bubble. The Legion have no time to set the bubble and arrive at its last setting, Smallville in Superboy's time. They hide the bubble and aided by Clark Kent (Superboy) they assume secret identities. Through Lana Lang and the Smallville townsfolk, Mordru finds the Legion. They battle and again, Mordru is left imprisoned and comatose.

=== Earthwar ===
Mordru manipulated the Resource Raiders, the Khunds, the Dark Circle and events on Weber's World (a diplomatic conference between the United Planets and the Dominion) to take over Earth and defeat the Legion, but is defeated. In the aftermath of the crisis, the Khunds and the Dark Circle are driven out of United Planets territory. The United Planets and the Dominion sign an extended peace treaty.

=== Legion of Super-Heroes, volume 4 ===
Mordru is fated to rule the universe for a thousand years. The Time Trapper tries to use the Legion to stop Mordru's rise to power, but in "The Great Darkness Saga", the Legion become more powerful than expected. The Time Trapper realizes the Legion is a potential threat. When Mon-El destroys the Time Trapper, it disrupts the space-time continuum and reveals a universe in which Mordru does come to power. The villain Glorith casts a spell at the expense of her own life. With this spell, she goes back in time and becomes responsible for the creation of the Legion.

In the new timeline, Glorith orchestrates a battle between Mordru and the Legion. Glorith plans to have Mordru and the Legion destroy each other so she can come to power. Ultra Boy discovers her plan and coerces Mordru to attack Glorith. At this point, the sorcerers of Zerox remove Mordru's powers and cure his mind. He then marries Mysa Nal and moves to the planet Tharn.

Following the Magic Wars, there is a galactic economic collapse and Tharn faces destruction by the Khund. To protect the planet against the Khund starships, the Sorcerers' Council restores Mordru's powers, even though they know the power will corrupt him. Mordru defeats the Khunds and becomes Emperor, allying with Glorith.

=== Relations with other villains (Pre-Zero Hour) ===
Due to Mordru's power, other would-be conquerors of the 30th century consider Mordru (and hence the Legion) in their plans. For example, Pulsar Stargrave masquerades as Brainiac 5's father and sends his real father on a series of missions to gather artifacts that could defeat Mordru. Stargrave enlists the aid of the Time Trapper, a "time manipulator". Stargrave orders the Time Trapper to prove his worth by killing the Legion. When the Time Trapper fails, Stargrave tries to enlist the Legion themselves. Later on, the alien sorcerer Sden tries to trick the Legion into retrieving yet another artifact, again with the goal of defeating Mordru.

=== Post-Zero Hour (30th and 31st centuries) ===
After Zero Hour: Crisis in Time!, the future of the DC Universe is rebooted. Instead of an established Legion, a new Legion with younger heroes had just been formed, and the history between the 21st and 30th centuries had changed. The story after Zero Hour has Mordru establishing a large empire in the 28th and 29th centuries before being imprisoned by Mysa (now his daughter rather than his apprentice) in a vault on the Yuen asteroid. In the battle, Mysa's allies are killed and she is severely aged.

Mordru is released by a mining project on the Yuen asteroid controlled by a group of disgruntled Legion rejects. The new Legion consisting of Sensor, Umbra and Magno investigates unusual events on the asteroid. Mordru searches for his lost talismans which hold his power such as the Emerald Eye of Ekron. The owner of the Eye defends the relic until the Legion defeats Mordru and imprisons him in an airtight sphere.

=== Legion of 3 Worlds ===
In Legion of 3 Worlds, a tie-in to the Final Crisis storyline, Mordru is one of Superboy-Prime's Legion of Super-Villains. Mordru rules the Sorcerers' World and holds the White Witch hostage. After killing Glorith, Dragonmage, and Prince Evillo, Mordru holds the remaining magic of the universe. He also receives the power of Kinetix (killed by Superboy-Prime) and that of the other sorcerers of "Universe-247". However, the White Witch absorbs Mordru. Due to Mordru's evil in doing, so she becomes the "Black Witch".

=== The New 52 ===
In 2011, "The New 52" rebooted the DC universe. In Demon Knights, Mordru and Questing Queen work together to find a specific artifact, and come into conflict with Etrigan the Demon.

== Powers and abilities ==
Mordru is recognized as an ultimate-level magic wielder capable of performing virtually any feat by manipulating forces within the universe according to his own will and possessing exceptional endurance surpassing superhuman limitations, superhuman strength, and immortality. Throughout the character's depiction, his powers were initially connected to his mastery of black magic. In later portrayals, Mordru's powers are instead derived from "chaos magic", which requires no systems (pentagrams, sigils, grimoires, incantations, etc.) to produce the desired outcome.

=== Weaknesses ===
Despite his immense power, Mordru has claustrophobia and cannot properly perform magic when methods such as burial or entrapment are employed. Mordru's overconfidence in his abilities often proves to be a hindrance, making him underestimate opponents or overlook potential threats in which creates opportunities for his opponents to exploit. Furthermore, Mordru is also somewhat limited by the boundaries of his imagination and requires a physical vessel and host to use his magical powers.

== Other versions ==
=== Legionnaire ===
The Legionnaire (also known as the Golden Age Legionnaire) is a younger version of Mordru who operated as a hero and sought to prevent himself from becoming a villain in the future. He aided Atom, Ma Hunkel, and the All-Star Squadron before mysteriously vanishing. By "Flashpoint Beyond", Legionnaire was among the thirteen missing Golden Age superheroes held in the Time Masters' capsules. When the capsules failed, the sidekicks were returned to their own times, with history rebuilding around them.

Legionnaire appears before Power Girl, Hawkman, Salem the Witch Girl, and Stargirl, stating that he wants to join the JSA. They eventually allow him to join on a provisional basis after he tells them his background. After Icicle accidentally summons Surtur, Legionnaire borrows Hawkman's life force resurrects Gentleman Ghost from his undead state, causing Surtur to explode. Legionnaire goes on to join the JSA despite Hawkman's objections. The JSA is then confronted by the Legion of Super-Heroes, who believe that Legionnaire still has the capacity for evil and want to imprison him.

In the ensuing battle, Legionnaire senses that something is wrong as Doctor Fate and the Legion of Substitute Heroes show to warn them that there is a traitor among them. Just then, Eclipso rips himself out of Wildcat's body and starts eclipsing everyone. Legionnaire enchants one of Huntress' arrows and shoots Eclipso with it, trapping Eclipso in the Black Diamond. To appease all parties, Rainbow Girl arranges for Legionnaire and Huntress to join the 31st-century version of the JSA.

== In other media ==
=== Television ===
- Mordru appears in Legends of the Superheroes, portrayed by Gabriel Dell. This version is the leader of the Legion of Doom.
- Mordru makes a non-speaking appearance in the Justice League Unlimited episode "The Greatest Story Never Told".
- Mordru appears in the Legion of Super Heroes episode "Trials", voiced by Jim Ward. This version was previously banished from Zerox and stripped of his magic.

=== Video games ===
- Mordru appears in DC Universe Online.
- Mordru appears as a character summon in Scribblenauts Unmasked: A DC Comics Adventure.

=== Miscellaneous ===
Mordru appears in Legion of Super Heroes in the 31st Century #18.
