= List of DC Comics characters: X =

== X ==
Name	Alter ego(s)	First appearance	Year	Date	Writer	Artist
X' Hal		The New Teen Titans #24	1982	October	Marv Wolfman	George Pérez
X-21	Superwoman Robot	Action Comics #333	1966	February	Leo Dorfman	Jim Mooney
X-2-Y	Dick Malvin	Action Comics #344	1966	December	Jim Shooter	Jim Mooney
X-5 Super Agent	G-5	Hit Comics #1	1940	July	Will Eisner	Charles Sultan
X		Military Comics #1	1942	March	Vernon Henkel	Vernon Henkel
Doctor Xadu		Adventure Comics #283	1961	April	Robert Bernstein	George Papp
Xanna		Empire #1	2000	May	Mark Waid	Barry Kitson
Xanthi		New Titans #51	1989	January	Marv Wolfman and George Pérez	George Pérez
Xardo		Action Comics #325	1965	June		Curt Swan
Xasnu		Action Comics #278	1961	July	Jerry Coleman	Curt Swan
Charles Xavier	Doctor Strangefate	DC Versus Marvel Comics #3	1996	February	Ron Marz and Peter David	Dan Jurgens and Claudio Castellini
Xax (I)	Green Lantern of Space Sector 3500	Green Lantern (vol. 2) #9	1961	December	John Broome	Gil Kane
Xax (II)	Green Lantern of Space Sector 3500	52 #31	2006	December	Grant Morrison, Geoff Johns, Mark Waid and Greg Rucka	Freddie Williams II
X-Bomb Betty		Legionnaires #2	1993	May	Mary Bierbaum and Tom Bierbaum	Chris Sprouse
Xebel		Aquaman #11	1963	September	Jack Miller	Nick Cardy
Xenofobe		Superman #295	1976	January	Curt Swan	Elliot S. Maggin
Xeo		Detective Comics #260	1958	October		Sheldon Moldoff
Xera	Xera Kharindot	Legion of Super-Heroes (vol. 3) #32	1987	March	Paul Levitz	Greg LaRocque
Xiuhtecutli		Justice League International (vol. 2) #63	1994	April	Gerard Jones and Will Jacobs	Chuck Wojtkiewicz
XL Terrestrial		Teen Titans episode: "Deception"	2004	August		
Xolotl		52 #21	2006	September	Geoff Johns, Grant Morrison, Greg Rucka and Mark Waid	Keith Giffen and Joe Bennett
Xov		Action Comics #242	1958	July		Howard Sherman
Xylpth	Green Lantern of Space Sector 151	Green Lantern (vol. 2) #151	1982	April	Paul Kupperberg	Carmine Infantino

== Xadu ==
Xadu (later spelled Xa-Du) is a Kryptonian scientist who conducted experiments in suspended animation.

=== Xadu in other media ===
Xadu appears in DC Universe Online.

== Xanadoth ==
- First appearance: Superman (vol. 5) #23 (July 2020)
- Created by: Brian Michael Bendis; Kevin Maguire; John Timms
- Teams: Lords of Chaos
- Abilities: Immense cosmic and magical powers
- Aliases: Lord of All Chaos

Xanadoth is a supervillain appearing in American comic books published by DC Comics. The character was created by writer Brian Michael Bendis and depicted by artists Kevin Maguire and John Timms, first appearing in Superman (vol. 5) #23 (July 2020). Although appearing in a Superman title, the character serves as a reoccurring adversary for Doctor Fate (Khalid Nassour).

During Khalid Nassour's psychotherapy with Superman following the outing of his secret identity to the public, Xanadoth is accidentally awakened by an agent of the Department of Extranormal Operations (DEO) and assaults the Tower of Fate to claim the Helmet of Fate's power and add to her already overwhelming power. Nabu first reveals her origins as a Lord of Chaos so extreme both the Lords representing order and chaos banded together to seal her away. With Nabu's guidance and the timely intervention of the Justice League Dark, Superman and Doctor Fate manage to banish Xanadoth. Later, she reappears with intents to hijack Black Adam's body for her own means. Confident, she sends visions to Nassour and Zatanna, the top "mystic warriors" on Earth of a possessed Adam before achieving her goal and pilfers the Helmet of Fate. Regrouping, the Justice League and Justice League Dark combine their efforts to combat Xanadoth. Doctor Fate regains his helm, the team frees Adam of his possession, and a combined attack from Doctor Fate, Zatanna, Madame Xanadu, Adam, and newcomer Naomi McDuffie (whose powers amplify magic) defeats Xanadoth.

== Xeen Arrow ==
Xeen Arrow was a vigilante hailing from Dimension Zero, an alternate world inhabited by telepathic giants. A scientist by day, he had a secret identity as the vigilante Xeen Arrow, being a counterpart of Green Arrow, whom he met when he was accidentally transported to Prime Earth.

== Xiang-Fa ==
Minister Xiang-Fa was the ruler of the trading city of Chao-Tzu in Chinese Empire during the 10th century. In order to ensure China's Westward expansion, Xiang-Fa created an army known as the Yellow Warriors and a wall around the city. The army under Xiang-Fa's command opposed renegade Green Lantern Yalan Gur, who was then weakened by the Guardians of the Universe to become vulnerable to wood, and therefore, even the peasants could hurt him with their wooden clubs.

== Xylon ==
Xylon is a Fleet Admiral of the Dominators army, who joined Vril Dox and the R.E.B.E.L.S. team to defeat Starro the Conqueror, and eventually took an individual name for the first time in his race.
