= Doctor Fate (Khalid Nassour) =

- Khalid Nassour's design as Doctor Fate. Art by Amancay Nahuelpan.

Publication information
- Publisher: DC Comics
- First appearance: Convergence: Aquaman #2 (May 2015)
- Created by: Paul Levitz; Sonny Liew

In-story information
- Alter ego: Dr. Khalid Kent Nassour, M.D.
- Species: Metahuman (comics); Homo Magi (select media)
- Place of origin: Brooklyn, New York
- Team affiliations: Justice League; Justice League Dark; Justice Society of America; Lords of Order
- Partnerships: Stitch; Nabu; Doctor Fate (Kent Nelson); Salem the Witch Girl; Hauhet
- Notable aliases: Fate, Young Fate, Son of Pharaohs, Khalid Nelson, Kent, Heir of the Pharaohs
- Abilities: List: Immortality; Mastery in magic and supernatural knowledge; High-level intellect; Extensive knowledge in medicine; Skilled hand-to-hand combatant; Via Helmet of Fate; Enhanced magical manipulation and spell-casting; Enhanced intellect; Enhanced superhuman strength; Fourth wall awareness; Probability manipulation; Precognition; Elemental control

Dr. Khalid Nassour (Arabic: خالد نصور) is a superhero featured in American comic books published by DC Comics. Created by Paul Levitz and artist Sonny Liew, Nassour first appeared in Aquaman: Convergence #2 (May, 2015) and is the eighth version of Doctor Fate. Unlike prior versions, the character has profound ties to the ancient Egyptian aesthetic of the Doctor Fate moniker, being both of Egyptian origin and powers connected to Egyptian mythology, and is the first Muslim character in DC Comics to headline a solo series.

Debuting as a mixed Egyptian-American and chosen by ancient Egyptian deities to be Doctor Fate, a legacy hero and sorcerer tasked with safeguarding the universe against supernatural menaces as one of DC Universe's foremost supernatural defenders, the character is grand-nephew of the original Doctor Fate and is supported by archangels in relation to his faith and Nabu, one of the Lords of Order. Unlike past versions of Fate, Nassour has agency in the role as Doctor Fate, and Nabu is characterized as a spiritual guide. The character began as a medical student but later status quo changes led to him being a physician, the sole incarnation of Doctor Fate in modern stories, and is alternatively supported by the goddess Hauhet in place of Nabu.

First featured in his own Doctor Fate solo title, he is often a reoccurring character in Justice League Dark and Justice Society of America comic book titles.The second longest-running incarnation as Doctor Fate to be published continually, Nassour's version has been considered generally mixed to positive, with critics suggesting the version to be a positive step towards representation in comics and believed incorporating an Egyptian-born character as Doctor Fate to make sense. However, criticism levied at the Nassour version has cited concern over the character's age compared to the original. Other concerns include elements of orientalism, inconsistent artistic depictions, and both reductive roles in comics and exclusion within media.

Thus far, the character has made few appearances in media. He would make his first media appearance in the animated series Young Justice, voiced by Usman Ally. He would also appear as a DLC summon character in Scribblenauts Unmasked: A DC Comics Adventure.

== Publication history ==
=== Creation and development ===
At the conclusion of the Convergence limited series in June 2015 and the launch of the "DC You" line, DC Comics introduced a new ongoing Doctor Fate series written by Paul Levitz and illustrated by Sonny Liew. This series featured Khalid Nassour, an Egyptian-American medical student, as the newest Doctor Fate. Levitz noted that Dan DiDio and Jim Lee aimed for a different approach compared to the original incarnation created by Gardner Fox during the Golden Age of Comic Books, with Levitz expressing particular fascination with the Egyptian connection of the character:

So looking at the kinds of diversity we have today, and remembering a bunch of my conversations with Egyptian Americans, I just thought, what if a person who gets the helmet this time, in this world, is an Egyptian American young man? And for a visual look, the guys really wanted something fresh - not the standard superhero approach that's been going on for the last few years. I liked Sonny Liew's work years ago on My Faith in Frankie, and ran into him in Singapore a few years ago when I got the chance to be the guest of honor at a convention there. And I've watched his work and stayed aware of it in the years since.

=== Comic book appearances ===
First appearing in Convergence: Aquaman #2 as part of a sneak peek preview in May 2015, the first issue of the Doctor Fate series was released in June 2015 and ran until its cancellation in November 2016, surrounding the character's origin story and early adventures, which included his connection to the original Doctor Fate (Kent Nelson), who made his New 52 debut within the same series. The character also made minor appearances in other titles in between 2015 and 2016. Afterwards, the character was absent for nearly two years and Kent Nelson's character returned to the role for a time.

In June 2018, Nassour was revealed to be a major character in the second Justice League Dark series written by James Tynion IV starring a new roster led by Wonder Woman and first appeared in the second issue of the series in August 2018. The character would become a reoccurring support character throughout the run, culminating to him adopting the Doctor Fate mantle officially from the Kent Nelson character officially and was redesigned with a new Doctor Fate costume. While the original 2018 series was cancelled in 2020, the Justice League Dark series was instead re-purposed as a backup issue to the mainstream Justice League title, the backup issue written by Ram V featuring a new storyline with Khalid remaining a reoccurring member of the Justice League Dark subdivision. The character also made notable appearances in several title crossovers and Bendis's run on the Justice League title.

In late 2022, Nassour was revealed to be among the cast of characters in Geoff Johns' upcoming Justice Society of America limited comic book series, which would include the exploration of the character as a legacy hero and continue the story established from V's backup issues of Justice League Dark. The title addresses timeline discrepancies, noting events like "Zero Hour" occurred eight years earlier and the 2015 Doctor Fate series is set one year prior. However, Khalid's appearances in other titles and in the series suggest a tenure longer than four years, as he is depicted as a first-year resident physician. The character would later appear in several other company crossovers, including Dark Crisis alongside its spin-offs. In 2023, the character made several appearances in Knight Terrors. In the same year, the previous histories of Doctor Fate was later restored, retroactively making the character the eighth person within the DC Universe to adopt the mantle, whereas past stories imply he is the second succeeding Nelson.

In 2024, the character appears in the Absolute Power crossover. Coinciding with the DC All In initiative, a new JSA series was announced in July with writer Jeff Lemiere and illustrator Diego Olortengui as part of the creative team. Lemiere revealed Nassour as an important character within the series. Nassour also appeared in the event DC K.O., featured in variant covers and previews for the crossover event and previews.

== Characterization ==
=== Fictional character biography ===
The characters' history is subjected to varying inconsistencies; originally the direct successor of Kent Nelson, Nassour has been placed as the eight successor of Doctor Fate (after Kent V. Nelson) and recently, he is considered the fourth successor. His origin story was also clarified to take place during the "Darkseid War" and "Dark Nights: Metal" storylines.

Born to Mohammend Nassour and Elizabeth Nassour (nee Nelson), Khalid Nassour is a second-generation Egyptian-American and Muslim whose paternal family lineage is connected to ancient Egyptian pharaohs. By age twenty-two, Nassour is a former EMT and summa cum laude college graduate with aspirations to become a physician. Just before starting medical school, he is chosen by Bastet as the newest incarnation of Doctor Fate due to his pharaoh bloodline awakening magical powers and is granted the Helmet of Fate. With the aid of Nabu, the spiritual guide of the Helmet of Fate, he is tasked with overcoming Anubis, who threatens to destroy the world and testable a new hierarchy of power. While initially reluctant to take the role, he accepts the role and manages to defeat the god. While balancing his superhero and ordinary life, he battles various foes and encounters great uncle Kent Nelson, who reveals himself as the original Doctor Fate and before mentoring him in the mystic arts.

Khalid Nassour's redesign as Doctor Fate depicted in Batman vs. Robin #3 (February 2023). Art by Simone Di Meo.

Sometime later, his apprenticeship is interrupted for when he is imprisoned by Nabu in a vase, whom hijacked Nelson's body and turns to extreme methods to battle the Otherkind, who feed on magic, and removes Nassour to deter him. He is freed by Man-Bat, a new member of Wonder Woman's incarnation of the Justice League Dark team studying magic in a humanoid hybrid form that allows him to retain intelligence. Aiding the team, he is instrumental in stopping Nabu and the Lords of Order's plans to destroy all magic to starve the Otherkind, which would include countless magical dimensions and beings connected to magic as causalities. Nabu is sealed into the Helmet of Fate once more, unable to be used without a willing host, and Nassour joins the Justice League Dark alongside Kent Nelson as an advisor but rejects Kent's insistence on Khalid being the next Doctor Fate. He rescinds his decision a short time afterwards when the sorceress supervillain Circe founds the Injustice League Dark and strikes at the team with her newfound power, possessing Hecate's mystical power. When the villains gain the upper-hand, Nassour convinces Nabu to let him don the helm with agency and cede his power successfully, and helps defeat the villains and officially succeeds Nelson as Doctor Fate. He would become a trusted member of the Justice League and Justice League Dark, aiding the team in balancing the elemental forces and was pivotal in opposing Upisde-Down Man (leader of the Otherkind) but was knocked out during the battle. Kent would step in his place and sacrificed himself to deal a blow but depletes the helm in the process and Zatanna ultimately defeats the magical being. Nassour would partner with Man-Bat to aid in restoring his helm's power and finds it inhabited by a new Egyptian spirit, the deity Hauhet and warns him of his impending defeat and destruction of the Tower of Fate at a evil Merlin's hands. He aids the Justice League Dark in fending off Merlin's agents (including a resurrected Arion) but he escapes.

He also helps various heroes (Flash, Superman, Naomi, etc.) with both his mystical and medical expertise while taking in Stitch, a teenaged, animated, non-binary ragdoll as his apprentice and sent them to Teen Titans Academy to learn the values of heroism. While the Justice League and Justice League Dark banded together to battle Xanadoth, whom possessed Black Adam, Nabu temporarily returns to aid them. Following the supposed demise of core Justice League members, Nassour joins the Justice Society of America and helps in efforts to defeat Pariah and the Great Darkness. Some time after Nezha's reemergence, it is deduced by Batman that Khalid would have been bested by the demon, explaining his possession of the Helmet of Fate and his disappearance. Batman would enlist new hero Dreamer to track him down and rescue him in a bid to track the Helmet of Fate.

Now a medical school and intern physician, he becomes entangled in Per Degaton's scheme to destroy the JSA through a ritual by murdering them with an elevated level of power as a anomaly and meets a version of Helena Wayne (Huntress), who is his teammate in the future. Degaton underestimates Khalid and during a battle with the JSA and various Degatons, he rescues JSA members across time moments before their deaths and with the aid of two other Doctor Fates, he seals the original Degaton. He later meets Salem the Witch Girl, Kent's original displaced and arrogant sidekick who is hostile due to his inheritance of the Fate legacy and he places her in the JSA's custody before being taken to the future to help Legion of Substitute Heroes. He arrives months later and reveals Eclipso's hand in manipulating a battle between the Justice Society and Legion and Super-Heroes and reconciles with Salem. When Amanda Waller manages to disenfrances heroes from the public and de-power them, Nassour's helmet is depleted and he is captured by Amazo robots. Some time later, Nassour is a member of the Justice League Unlimited, the team's imitative having a larger roster and fostering closer relations, and is among the many heroes who assist battling Darkseid, who bonded with the Spectre. However, the League inadvertently helps the villain create the Absolute Universe in defeating him. A insecure Nassour and the Justice Society would then battle a new iteration of the Injustice Society, who steal Nassour's helmet. Regaining his confidence, he rescues Jakeem Thunder and alongside the second Wildcat and Justice Society, he defeats Wotan, Johnny Sorrow, and the Unnamed Ones, lovecraftian-esque creatures worshiped by the villains.

=== Character description and design ===
Khalid Nassour unmasked. Art by Amancay Nahuelpan.

The character was created to emphasize aspects of ancient Egypt often incorporated in Doctor Fate in which was not possible with the original Doctor Fate character. A mixed Egyptian-American, Nassour's maternal line connects him to Kent Nelson and his family, who are of Swedish and British ancestry. Conversely, his paternal line makes him a family of ancient pharaohs in Egypt, granting him mystical potential. In lieu with other Doctor Fates, the character can be described as a respected member in superhero teams, a mystic consultant, and uniquely a therapist at select times. His prowess as a has also varied; he was first noted in his earlier publication to be less powerful than past versions of Doctor Fate. Other times, he is comparable to the original Doctor Fate and Zatanna, stated to being among the most powerful sorcerers and agent for the Lords of Order.

==== Physical and costume design ====
Khalid Nassour's designs throughout his publication history. The first three images depict the character's distinctive designs exclusive to him. The last image showcase a design shared with Kent Nelson.

When designing the character for the first time, artist Sony Liew first drew the character with a focus on representing his heritage through physical attributes (hair, nose shape, and skin tone) while depicting him with a more average physique, diverging from the muscular physiques often associated with superhero characters. Official profile sources also cite the character to be 5'5". Nassour was also as a young man older than typical college-aged superheroes to make him more distinguishable. Like the original version, Nassour's magic visual system employs the Egyptian ankh motif and typography, using letters and geometric forms such as circles and spirals as design elements to create a distinctive visual system. In some storylines, the visual system has also been accompanied by Egyptian hieroglyphs, the runic alphabet, and the Arabic alphabet.

As Doctor Fate, the character has been depicted wearing distinctive costumes. In his debut title, the character initially wore contemporary clothing comprising a blue hoodie and jeans while donning the Helmet of Fate and Amulet of Thoth. While the original intent was for the character to gradually acquire pieces of the original Doctor Fate costume, positive reception of the contemporary design led to an editorial decision to maintain the appearance. From the Justice League Dark series forward, he received a revised costume which depicts Nassour in a dark blue coverall scrub combined with a golden/yellow belt and loin cloth, a golden cape secured by the Amulet of Anubis, and golden/white-colored sneakers. This design is notable for incorporating the classic elements associated with Doctor Fate while blending elements of Egyptian aesthetics with contemporary American attire.

Despite the character's distinctive design and costume, he is occasionally depicted wearing the same outfits and accessories associated with modern costume variation of Kent Nelson and other associated Doctor Fates and sometimes has a more toned appearance and taller build. A variation of Nelson's design, similar but also unique to Nassour, includes a muscular build with a blue bodysuit, yellow sun-disk belt that extends all around, a golden Usekh collar able to house the amulet, and a yellow cloak connected to it. Similar elements from the variation are invoked in alternate, future versions of the character.

==== Age discrepancies ====
While originally twenty-two years old in his debut according to Paul Levitz, subsequent appearances features various inconsistencies despite various stories implying a passage of time such as his graduation of medical school, a process that takes three to four years on average, and involvement in storylines over time. Geoff John's timeline and placement made the character twenty-three in age. Conversely, despite his appearances chronologically taking place after both aforementioned series, Jeff Lemire's 2025 JSA and the writer himself had stated the character's age to be early twenties (twenty-one specifically).

=== Personality and motivations ===
Within comics, Khalid Nassour has been portrayed as a knowledgeable and responsible but more relatable version of Doctor Fate, retaining full personal agency while Nabu (and future spiritual guides) acts akin to a combination between a GPS and the MCU's J.A.R.V.I.S, contrasting with previous portrayals as a overbearing presence. Less distant and foreboding than his predecessors, Khalid has a more charismatic personality and serves as a hopeful and optimistic presence among his teams. He is also influenced by different religious traditions derived from his mother's Christianity, his father's Islamic beliefs, and the ancient Egyptian pantheon influence present in Doctor Fate titles. Alternatively, he has been characterized as an inexperienced young hero whose age and continual learning distinguish him from other versions of Doctor Fate. While he struggles with self-doubt and the responsibility of the Helmet of Fate, Khalid remains compassionate and determined as he embraces the role of Doctor Fate.

=== Powers and abilities ===
With his pharaonic heritage affording natural magical abilities, his powers includes flight, telekinesis, time manipulation, immortality, and senses that allows him to see souls (as a ba) and sense the impending death of others. His training also grants extensive supernatural knowledge and knowledge of several different languages. Nassour is also highly intelligence, graduating with highest Latin honor and is trained medical professional, giving him a considerable degree of knowledge in emergency medicine, chemistry, organic chemistry, and psychology. He also has some combat training from the original Wildcat.

His magical powers are bolstered by various artifacts as Doctor Fate, using them to amplifiy his magical power and protects him against the inherent risks of magic. Wielding the Helmet of Fate, his powers bestows elemental manipulation and magical powers powered by his will and the elements, having been granted such blessing by Thoth in his stories. With Hauhet as his guiding spirit, he can see into eternity, allowing him to see into the past, future, and break the fourth wall. Khalid also possesses the Amulet of Anubis and Cloak of Destiny, the former deriving magical powers from distilled essence of past Doctor Fate and the latter being fire-proof and resistant to chaos magic tradtiionally. Unique to him, he uses the Staff of Power, an artifact gifted to him by Thoth, allows for energy manipulation and its complete power is only able to be used by those with the pharaoh bloodline. He also carries the Eternity Book, a grimoire containing Merlin's most powerful spells.

While powerful, Nassour limitations of his powers damages his sight when peering into the future, makes him vulnerable to injuries of divine and ghostly origin as he cannot self-heal them, and his confidence and faith impacts his abilities. Earlier accounts once describe him as the weakest version of Doctor Fate and like other versions, is inferior to Spectre in power.

== Themes ==
Inspired by Doctor Strange and Spider-Man, the character's stories followed Nassour as a Khalid as young man burdened with significant responsibilities, embarking on a journey of self-discovery within a world reminiscent of Doctor Strange's mystical realm. His earlier stories are described as a mix of a mystical coming-of-age storyline mixed with a modern youth slice of life. Sika A. Dogbovie-Mullins believes Khalid's heroic journey is linked to his lineage and the concept of a "divine right of kings," aligning with Chosen One narrative trope. Unlike iconic American superheroes like Batman or Superman who fight for truth, justice, and the American way, Khalid is chosen to fight for truth, justice, and the "(ancient) Egyptian ways."

== Supporting cast ==
The character's primary supporting cast in the 2015 Doctor Fate series, consists of; Muhammed and Elizabeth Nassour (née Nelson), Nassour's parents aware of his dual life whom are of respectively an Egyptian Muslim and Christian archaeologist. The family cat, Puck, is a vessel for the goddess Bastet, whom supports Nassour. Kent Nelson, his maternal granduncle, is his mentor. Nabu served as his spiritual guide and advises him but is often vague, making him figure out certain situations. Thoth and various arch-angels also support Nassour (the former's power vested in the helm in the series) while following the edicts of DC Comics' depiction of Allah, the character known as the Presence. The Egyptian deities within the series are contextualized as angels believing themselves deities. Nassour also has a extended cast who appear in various stories outside his series; after succeeding Nelson, Nassour adopted, jovial, non-binary animated ragdoll Stitch as both his child and apprentice. After Nabu's disappearance, Hauhet replaces him as the Helmet of Fate's guide and patron. Time-displaced and former apprentice of Nelson, Salem the Witch Girl, also serves as a complicated ally.

The character also has several love interests; the 2015 depicts Shaya Helim, a fellow aspiring physician with interest in neurology, as his girlfriend in the series. The 2015 series also introduced Akila, Khalid's childhood best friend who encourages him towards activism and is unaware of his heroic identity, also has romantic feelings for him. In Justice Society-related titles, a future version of Power Girl hints a romantic implication with his future counterpart.

=== Enemies ===
Having several re-occurring adversaries, Anubis served as a chief antagonist and his first adversary due to the Nassour's bloodline aligning with the pharaohs, able to invoke influence over him. While usually an ally and confidante who favors him, Nabu has also served in antagonistic roles. Nassour is also enemies with Wotan, a shared arch-rival of the original Doctor Fate and Nabu. In team settings, he frequently encounters Eclipso and was enemies with a rogue Merlin.

Character	First appearance
Anubis	1st Issue Special #9 (December, 1975)
Arion	Warlord #55 (March 1982)
Clothorus	Doctor Fate #17 (October, 2016)
Wotan	More Fun Comics #55 (May, 1940)
Xanadoth	Superman #23 (September, 2020)
Upside-Down Man	Justice League Dark #1 (September, 2018)
Nabu	More Fun Comics #67 (May, 1941)
Eclipso	House of Secrets #61 (August 1963)
Merlin	New Comics #3 (February, 1936)

== Other versions ==
Nassour's character has appeared in various other Elseworld titles such as a cameo appearance in DC Black Label series Batman: Full Moon, a teenage version kown as Kid Fate in DC's Misfits, and has two variations from possible futures in the DC Multiverse: The Future State event showcased a older Nassour (years after the events of the Great Wickedness storyline mending the broken Helmet of Fate and lived through several timelines to learn how to defeat Merlin. Found in a disguise as a blind old man, he reveals himself and strikes a deal with Merlin but reminds Etrigan of a demon's perception of time differing. Another possible future showcased Nassour as one of the last legacies of the JSA active and de-facto team leader. Approving of Helena Wayne's direction of rehabitated former JSA advesaries, he is killed by an empowered Per Degaton seeking to destroy the team across all time. While Degaton's efforts is thwarted by his present self, the future version of Nassour is erased due to Helena Wayne's actions in the present time alongside all her teammates and reality.

=== Khalid Ben-Hassin ===
In 2013, a new incarnation of the Doctor Fate character, Khalid Ben-Hassin, was created, appearing in the Earth 2 comic book series by James Robinson. Predating Nassour by two years, Robinson created the character as Egyptian-American. Robinson made this decision, making Khalid Egyptian-American rather than purely Egyptian, to avoid making him a racial caricature. Khalid is characterized as an archaeologist who is reluctant in the role of Doctor Fate. Unlike prior versions, the characters' powers are directly tied into invoking ancient Egyptian deities.

In his debut storyline "The Tower of Fate", it is revealed that two years prior, Khalid and Kendra Saunders-Munoz were sent to uncover the Tomb of Nabu, the dwelling of a powerful mage, by the World Army, the ordeal in which gave Kendra her wings and revealed Khalid as being Nabu's chosen vessel. Instead of accepting its power, Khalid sent the helmaway with the remnant of power he gained after bearing the Helm for a brief time. Hesitant on accepting himself as Nabu's vessel since, he is later coerced when Wotan kidnaps him, Flash (Jay Garrick), and Jay's mother to force Khalid to retrieve the helm within the Tower of Fate, which cannot be accessed by anyone else other than himself and those in his proximity. Inspired by Flash's heroism and bravery, he chooses to become Nabu's agent of order and chaos, christening himself "Doctor Fate". He battles Wotan and eventually prevails with the help of Nabu's deceased spirit and using his knowledge of Egyptian deities to banish Wotan. Later, Doctor Fate appears as among the many heroes repelling against Darkseid's invasion of Earth 2 although Nabu attempts to abandon him for a new host, only for it to be trapped. Khalid reclaims the helm and reprimands Nabu, stating his intentions to destroy the helm once Darkseid has been defeated.

== Reception and critical impact ==
=== Positive impact ===
Nassour's character has been generally well received by critics; Book Riot's Jessica Plumber noted similarities between Khalid and Marvel Comics' Kamala Khan, both of whom represent important additions to the underrepresented demographic and praised the character's design and significance of diverse representation in the comic book industry, commending the creators for addressing the gap. IGN writer Levi Hunt viewed the character as a positive step in establishing diversity within DC Comics and appreciated the incorporation of Egyptian mythology, which deviates from the commonly used Greek and Roman mythological themes prevalent in comics. Charli Snow of CBR also positively viewed Khalid's character in several storylines pertaining to both the 2015 Doctor Fate and 2018 Justice League Dark comic book series, also noting the character's heritage in relation to Doctor Fate's Egyptian connections, more accessible storylines, and noted his ascension to leadership in the latter series.

Noah Sharma, for Comicon, praised the character's role and importance in throughout the series and James Tynion IV's use of the character, opining in issue #12 that "Zatanna and Wonder Woman have too much importance to the story to turn away from them now, but it's Khalid that invests you and Khalid who succeeds in infusing the moment with hope and heroism.". In his guest appearances such as the 2018 Superman series, one reviewer noted how Nassour's version is "less omnipotent and foreboding and much more relatable and understanding." She also noted how the dialoague and character's down to earth "makes for a very magnetic personality."

=== Criticisms ===
Ashley Hurt of CBR expressed the character's age diminishing the struggles of Nelson's Doctor Fate and believed the character being older and a design reminiscent of a traditional Doctor Fate costume would help the character. Although Hurt's assessment of the character stated him to be of college age, the character's age slightly older during his debut, thus deviating from her statement.

==== Elements of orientalism ====
In Mixed Race Superheroes, Adrienna Resha, a researcher for Comic Studies Societies, notes numerous elements of Orientalism within Nassour's 2015 Doctor Fate series: She critiques Nassour's relationship as Doctor Fate in comparison to his white counterpart (Kent Nelson), noting how in issue #9, he worries about intervening in a massive demonstration gone awry within the United Nations plaza without being labelled "some kind of super-villain or costumed terrorist" and asserts how Nelson's incarnation likely wouldn't have worried about being labelled a terrorist (and only a super-villain at worst), Nassour is aware he would not be afforded the same level of protections as a person of color. She criticizes this approach due to his powers have repercussion practicing Egyptian mysticism despite his heritage compared to Kent, who faces none for his practices.

Resha also noted how the series presents a "false binary" between his identity as an American and Arabic ethnic identity, portrayed as having Arab exceptionalism and ethnicity incompatible with American exceptionalism and citizenship. Noting how the Helmet of Fate seemingly micro-socially prioritizing his Egyptian heritage and love triangle involving Akila and Shaya (love interests) representing the respective identities as he prefers the later but often becomes Fate to save the former. She asserts that Nassour's identity as a citizen should not narratively require him to prove more for him to belong due to being an American citizen through his mother, and asserts Khalid fails to "reconcile his Egyptian/immigrant and American/citizen identity" due to this.

==== Usage critiques ====
Throughout his publication, several concerns were raised from Nassour's roles in several other titles; Plummer believed that the Doctor Fate comic featuring Khalid did not feel innovative or culturally authentic and suggested the need for a Muslim-led writer to bring a more genuine perspective. She was also critical of the character's storyline early in James Tynion IV's run in Justice League Dark, where Khalid's fate involved being trapped within a vase by Nabu. She interpreted this plot development as an unintentional metaphor, considering Khalid, an Egyptian-born character, being reduced to a hieroglyphic confined within an ancient vase. Resha also pointed out inconsistencies in how the character was drawn, characterized, and colored, particularly in relation to his age and skin tone. The researcher also noted that Khalid was often sidelined in favor of other characters, including his predecessor Kent Nelson, despite being the only clearly identifiable person of color in the team also criticized the character for frequently invoking Egypt's ancient past instead of exploring its modern history.

Comic historian Tim Hanley highlighted Nassour's character as having a short-lived ongoing series before being regulated into a secondary character in team books since the series conclusion, arguing that characters of colors existing within DC Comics and Marvel Comics are frequently sidelined, exist as backlist team members, or fade into obscurity.

=== Critical response ===
- CBR included Khalid Nassour in their list of the "10 Most Powerful Golden Age DC Legacy Heroes".
- Gizmodo featured Khalid Nassour's comic and Young Justice versions in an article highlighting other Muslim heroes.
- Egyptian Streets featured the Khalid Nassour version of Doctor Fate in a list of Egyptian comic book superheroes.
- Motivate Media Group's Whats On highlights Khalid Nassour's Doctor Fate in a list of Arab superheroes.
- David Harth of CBR included Khalid Nassour in "10 B-List DC Heroes Who Deserve Better".
- Looper ranked Khalid Nassour's "Blood Price" storyline as #1 in "DC's Doctor Fate: The 12 Most Memorable Comic Moments Ranked".

== In other media ==
- Khalid Nassour appears in the fourth season of Young Justice, voiced by Usman Ally. This version is a homo magi, protégé of Zatanna, and a member of her Sentinels of Magic. Additionally, he can perform magic by speaking his intent in a combination of Latin, Ancient Greek, and Arabic. Over the course of his time as a Sentinel, he and his peers are tested as and would later become Doctor Fate as part of a rotational agreement between Nabu and Zatanna.
- Khalid Nassour appears as a character summon in Scribblenauts Unmasked: A DC Comics Adventure.

== Collections ==
Title	Material collected	Publication date	ISBN	Ref
Doctor Fate Vol. 1: The Blood Price	Doctor Fate (2015) #1-7, DC Sneak Peek: Doctor Fate #1	October 3, 2017	978-1401261214	
Doctor Fate Vol. 2: Prisoners of the Past	Doctor Fate (2015) #8-12	June 26, 2018	978-1401264925	
Doctor Fate Vol. 3: Fateful Threads	Doctor Fate (2015) #13-18	June 26, 2018	978-1401272418	

== See also ==
- Zachary, Brandon (26 September 2019). "Khalid Nassour: What Happened to DC's Last Doctor Fate?". CBR.
- Harth, David (16 August 2022). "10 B-List DC Heroes Who Deserve Better". CBR. Retrieved 11 November 2023
