= List of Justice League enemies =

This is a list of fictional characters from DC Comics who are or have been enemies of the Justice League. In chronological order (with issue and date of first appearance).

== Silver Age ==
Villain	First appearance	Description
Ultra-Humanite	Action Comics #13 (June 1939)	He was originally the first recurring nemesis to the Golden Age Superman and possibly the first comic book supervillain. Ultra-Humanite went on to battle the Justice Society of America before setting his sights on the Justice League with the Secret Society of Super Villains.
Lex Luthor	Action Comics #23 (April 1940)	Superman's nemesis; when the Man of Steel joined the League, Luthor saw it as a direct challenge to him and formed two Injustice Gangs. Pre-Crisis, he was a mad scientist; Post-Crisis, a corrupt billionaire.
Funhouse Aliens	Justice League of America #7 (November 1961)	Aliens that lost a war in a distant solar system 100,000 years ago. Their weapons were taken away, but they sent a probe through the Universe to record all weapons, enabling them to find one that was able to defeat their foes. They placed themselves in suspended animation for 100,000 years. Their ship instead landed on Earth. Assuming human form, they set up a Funhouse in a newly opened fair and abducted people, including Snapper Carr (the Justice League's mascot), to another planet. The League rescues Carr. Green Lantern sends the aliens back into their ship and into another 100,000-year sleep.
Joker	Batman #1 (Spring 1940)	Batman's nemesis; conned Snapper Carr into turning over his key to League headquarters and ambushed the team with the weapons of their greatest foes, fighting the group to a standstill. Later, believing himself to be dying of cancer, the Joker plunged the world into anarchy by enslaving Earth's villains with his Joker venom in the crossover storyline Joker: Last Laugh.
Vandal Savage	Green Lantern #10 (Winter 1943)	A caveman who was exposed to a meteorite that gave him immortality, and who has manipulated history, such as being a Pharaoh in Egypt and assisting the murder of Julius Caesar; he faced Alan Scott and then the Justice Society, becoming a founding member of the Injustice Society of the World, Savage turned his attention to the League in the wake of the former group's retirement. He gathered Clayface, Thorn, Eclipso, and Solomon Grundy against the team during its first year.
Solomon Grundy	All-American Comics #61 (October 1944)	A super-strong zombie risen from a swamp where Cyrus Gold had died many years earlier, who battles Green Lantern and is resistant to his ring due to the wood in his body. A frequent sparring partner to the Justice Society and often drafted in battles with the League, Grundy returned in one of his incarnations with greater intelligence, seeking true immortality by transferring his brain into Amazo's body.
Wizard	All Star Comics #34 (March 1945)	A dangerous magician who learned many spells such as illusions from a Tibetan monk whom he would later murder. He gathered the first two Injustice Societies. A frequent opponent of the Justice Society, the Wizard would lead the Secret Society of Super Villains against the League, switching bodies with them and learning their identities, only to have his memory wiped afterwards. With his memories restored by Despero, he led his fellow villains against Superman for revenge.
Per Degaton	All Star Comics #35 (June–July 1947)	Generally an enemy to the Justice Society, Degaton organized the Crime Syndicate to steal atomic missiles bringing the United States and Russia to near-war. The combined efforts of the Justice League, the Justice Society, and the All-Star Squadron stopped him.
Circe	Wonder Woman #37 (September–October 1949)	A powerful witch who gained her powers from Hecate, the Greek goddess of witchcraft, and who has a talent for transforming humans into beasts. Usually an enemy of Wonder Woman, Circe would come into conflict with the League on several occasions, including during War of the Gods, a bid to claim the Spear of Destiny, and during Amazons Attack!.
King Kull	Captain Marvel Adventures #125 (October 1951)	Ruler of the Submen who ruled Earth until humanity overthrew them thousands of years ago, killing most of them. Kull was a frequent foe to Captain Marvel due to his superhuman strength, advanced technology and desire to wipe out humanity.
Brainiac	Action Comics #242 (July 1958)	One of Superman's greatest enemies, the alien genius Brainiac faces the League on several occasions, such as "Panic in the Sky" and Brainiac 13's Y2K.
Getaway Mastermind	Detective Comics #259 (November 1958)	An enemy of the Martian Manhunter who organized a prison break and led Captain Cold, the Clock King, the Electric Man, the Puppet Master, and Professor Menace against the League.
Gorilla Grodd	The Flash #106 (May 1959)	One of a race of intelligent gorillas with mental powers. Primarily an enemy of the Flash, Grodd would face the League on several occasions, such as when he led the Secret Society of Super Villains, in the crossover event JLApe: Gorilla Warfare!, and when he enslaved the International Ultramarine Corps.
Starro	Brave and the Bold #28 (February - March 1960)	A large alien starfish who creates smaller copies of itself that attach themselves to others and bring them into the thrall of the original. First foe that the League fought as the League.
Weapons Master	Brave and the Bold #29 (May 1960)	A criminal from the 120th century, Xotar went back in time with a cache of weapons to battle the League, believing that the one to defeat them would be invincible and able to battle the Intersolar Police, due to a book written by Wonder Woman which seemed to indicate that he had defeated the League. He was defeated, however (as the book had been damaged where it recorded his defeat), and sent back to his time period. He would later appear again seeking to obtain Green Lantern's power ring and again as a leader of a cult that worshiped the League.
Amazo	The Brave and the Bold #30 (June 1960)	Built by Professor Ivo, Amazo has the powers and equipment of Wonder Woman, Green Lantern, the Flash, the Martian Manhunter, and Aquaman with the ability to copy the powers of any metahumans that it comes into contact with.
Professor Ivo	The Brave and the Bold #30 (June 1960)	Ivo constructed Amazo in pursuit of immortality. Ivo and his creations are responsible for the deaths of Vibe and Commander Steel.
Despero	Justice League of America #1 (October 1960)	The tyrant of Kalanor, Despero was a frequent opponent to the League with his hypnotic abilities. His abilities were upgraded by the Flame of Py'tar.
Saturna	Justice League of America #2 (December 1960)	The Lord of Misrule, Saturna aligns with Simon Magus to conquer Magic-Land.
Simon Magus	Justice League of America #2 (December 1960)	The evil magician Simon Magus, in his bid to conquer Magic-Land, aligns with Lord Saturna and the Troll King to steal scientific devices from Earth to defeat the realm's ruler Merlin. When artificial devices stop working on Earth due to Magus' efforts, the Justice League become involved in Magus' war.
Troll King	Justice League of America #2 (December 1960)	Attempting to overthrow the wizard Merlin, the Troll King aligns with Simon Magus to conquer Magic-Land.
Hyathis	Justice League of America #3 (February 1961)	Ruler of Alstai, Hyathis was at war with three other planets until Kanjar Ro enslaved the League to defeat Hyathis and the other planets once and for all. In the end, the League toppled all of the warlords. She could breathe underwater and control plant life.
Kanjar Ro	Justice League of America #3 (February 1961)	Using his Gamma Gong to enslave the League, Ro, as the despot of Dhor, sought to conquer neighboring planets that he was consistently at war with, threatening to leave all of Earth in a paralyzed state. He would return to face the League many times.
Kromm	Justice League of America #3 (February 1961)	Ruler of the planet Mosteel; deposed by the Justice League.
Sayyar	Justice League of America #3 (February 1961)	Ruler of the planet Llarr; deposed by the Justice League.
Hector Hammond	Green Lantern #5 (March–April 1961)	Primarily an enemy of Green Lantern, Hammond repeatedly fought the League over the years due to a meteor that evolved him, giving him psionic powers, though it left him unable to walk.
Phantom Zone Villains	Adventure Comics #283 (April 1961)	Criminals trapped in a vast prison discovered by Kryptonian scientists where they are able to see and hear within the universe, but generally unable to interact with it. While largely a problem for Superman, prisoners of the Zone have been known to escape and bring Earth's heroes against them.
Matter Master	The Brave and the Bold #35 (April–May 1961)	A Hawkman foe drafted to battle the Justice League alongside other villains on several occasions, the Matter Master would battle the League when he tried to eliminate the Golden Eagle.
Doctor Destiny	Justice League of America #5 (June 1961)	First impersonated Green Lantern using anti-gravity discs to try to capture the League. Later with the Materioptikon, Destiny was able to turn dreams into reality under his will.
Sinestro	Green Lantern #7 (July–August 1961)	Nemesis to Hal Jordan and rogue Green Lantern, Thaal Sinestro would frequently battle the League as a part of various villainous groups, until forming the Sinestro Corps (who used yellow power rings) and going to war with Earth and its flagship team, the Justice League.
Amos Fortune	Justice League of America #6 (August–September 1961)	A frequent sparring partner of the League who is able to manipulate his own luck, Fortune formed the original Royal Flush Gang.
Qwsp	Aquaman #1 (January–February 1962)	A reality-warping imp of the 5th dimension like Mister Mxyzptlk or Bat-Mite, Qwsp was Aquaman's fan and accompanied him. Later, when Aquaman become rougher and more rugged, Qwsp followed suit, in turn becoming a menace.
Appellaxians	Justice League of America #9 (February 1962)	When the heirs to the Appellaxian kingdom fought on Earth to decide who would rule, they inadvertently brought the Justice League together for its first time in order to stop them. They would return on several occasions to enslave the Earth.
Demons Three	Justice League of America #10 (March 1962)	Abnegazar, Ghast, and Rath are three demon brothers who ruled the galaxy one billion years ago until they were banished by the Timeless Ones. They have made repeated attempts to escape since.
Felix Faust	Justice League of America #10 (March 1962)	A centuries-old mage obsessed with power who sold his soul several times and even sold the soul of his son Sebastian Faust, only to be defeated repeatedly by the League.
Lord of Time	Justice League of America #10 (March 1962)	A time traveler from the year 3786 who consistently comes to the present to menace the League hoping to invade their century, now going by the name Epoch.
Doctor Light	Justice League of America #12 (June 1962)	A scientist turned villain, he went on to fight the League repeatedly before menacing the Teen Titans and reached an all-time low when he was trounced by Little Boy Blue and the Blue Boys. It was revealed after raping Sue Dibny, Zatanna, under League orders, lobotomized the villain. During the events of Identity Crisis, Light's memory was restored and he took Black Adam's seat on the Society.
Sonar	Green Lantern #14 (July 1962)	Primarily a Green Lantern foe, Sonar became a global threat when he laid claim to the Soviet Union leading an army of brainwashed metahumans, such as the Global Guardians, the Royal Flush Gang, Eurocrime and Justice League Antarctica, against Justice League Europe, the Justice Society and a small army of allies.
Zedd Brann	Justice League of America #13 (August 1962)	An alien from the planet Skarn who uses a device that will drain the life force of the universe. Brann also employs a device that makes perfect robot duplicates of his enemies to use against his foes.
Maestro	Justice League of America #16 (December 1962)	Using a gang equipped with musical instruments that compel those in earshot to dance, the Maestro tried to defeat the Justice League by encasing them in indestructible bubbles.
Spaceman X	Justice League of America #20 (June 1963)	A gigantic android bent on destroying Earth.
Crime Champions	Justice League of America #21 (August 1963)	When the Justice Society and the Justice League teamed together, their enemies banded together to oppose them, using a device that the Fiddler had discovered to travel between worlds.
Eclipso	House of Secrets #61 (August 1963)	The original Wrath of God, Eclipso was trapped in the Heart of Darkness and went on to live through those that happened upon shards of the large jewel. Eclipso has fought Earth's heroes several times, including during the crossover event Eclipso: The Darkness Within.
Shark	Green Lantern #24 (October 1963)	Generally an enemy of Green Lantern, Shark would join groups of villains against the Justice League on several occasions. He would then go on to battle the League using three other animals that he had evolved and brought under his control, calling them the Princes of Pery.
Queen Bee	Justice League of America #23 (November 1963)	Zazzala, queen of Korll, fought the League multiple times in trying to expand her empire.
Queen Bee	Justice League International #16 (August 1988)	Ruler of Bialya, she brainwashed the Global Guardians and fought the League.
Queen Bee	JLA: Incarnations #6 (December 2001)	Beatriz took over her sister's rule of Bialya and used the robotic Extremists that crossed swords with Extreme Justice.
Kraad the Conqueror	Justice League of America #25 (February 1964)	An alien from the planet Kraanal, Kraad followed three Sfarlians across the universe destroying planets that they visited.
T. O. Morrow	The Flash #143 (March 1964)	A brilliant scientist who created both the Red Tornado and the Tomorrow Woman and would menace both the Justice Society and the Justice League.
I	Justice League of America #27 (May 1964)	A cosmic entity who was being made inert by the efforts of the Justice League. Making its members unable to work together, the League was able to activate Amazo as a loophole to I's powers, defeating the entity.
Headmaster Mind	Justice League of America #28 (June 1964)	Criminal mastermind and inventor that drafted supervillains the Matter Master, the Tattooed Man, and the Top into his plots.
Crime Syndicate of America	Justice League of America #29 (August 1964)	An evil version of the Justice League on a parallel Earth called Earth-Three.
Super-Duper	Justice League of America #31 (November 1964)	Hoodlum Joe Parry gets a hold of a machine called the Panacomputer that makes an android named Super-Duper with the abilities of Hawkman, Green Lantern, the Flash, Wonder Woman, and Batman to do his bidding.
Brain Storm	Justice League of America #32 (December 1964)	Axel Storm developed a helmet that absorbed stellar energy and when worn allowed him the ability to develop virtually any technological device or mechanism, limited only by his imagination. However, the helmet would drive him mad and he sought the Justice League to witness him murder the man that he believed killed his brother, Fred. Later, even after learning that his brother (who would temporarily become Brain Storm in the future) was alive and that the helmet had distorted his perception, Brain Storm would still return occasionally to menace the League.
Alien-Ator	Justice League of America #33 (February 1965)	A conqueror able to turn humans into aliens under his thrall.
Key	Justice League of America #41 (December 1965)	Through use of psycho-chemicals, the Key expanded his mind and developed a key-theme for his criminal operations while facing the League.
Warlock of YS	Green Lantern #42 (January 1966)	A powerful wizard who switched bodies with Green Lantern and defeated the Justice League.
The Unimaginable	Justice League of America #42 (February 1966)	A being of incalculable power who roamed the universe wielding its might for its amusement, such as capturing alien beings. Happening upon the League during their battle with Kraad the Conqueror, he followed and observed them, inspired by their fight for justice. When they offered membership to Metamorpho, it battered the hero and demanded League membership for itself. When refused, it would return to menace the League as an enemy.
Royal Flush Gang	Justice League of America #43 (March 1966)	Several incarnations of a group based on a playing card theme that have faced the League many times.
Shaggy Man	Justice League of America #45 (June 1966)	The name of several artificial beings made from a plastalloy that makes them virtually indestructible.
Anti-Matter Man	Justice League of America #46 (August 1966)	A powerful entity from the Anti-Matter Universe who destroyed all matter that it touched. The combined power of the Justice Society and the Justice League defeated him.

== Bronze Age ==
Villain	First appearance	Description
Commander Blanx	Justice League of America #71 (May 1969)	A White Martian dictator who followed the Martian Manhunter to Earth in order to destroy him, but was repelled. He then sought genocide on his world, which brought the League to his doorstep.
Aquarius	Justice League of America #73 (August 1969)	A living star who tries to destroy Earth-Two's universe and battles the Justice League and Justice Society. The heroes manage to destroy him, but at a price.
Norch Lor	Justice League of America #80 (May 1970)	A Thanagarian who believes that the universe is ending and is trying to collect souls in his Ghenna Box in order to survive the event.
Jest-Master	Justice League of America #81 (June 1970)	Causing those that are sane to go mad in his vicinity, the Jest-Master travels to other worlds to spread insanity.
Darkseid	Superman's Pal Jimmy Olsen #134 (December 1970)	The despotic ruler of Apokolips and its evil New Gods, his search for the Anti-Life Equation brought him to Earth and into conflict with its heroes many times.
Ra's al Ghul	Batman #232 (June 1971)	An international terrorist, Ra's came into conflict with Batman after the hero turned down his offer to take his place in death. During the events of JLA: Tower of Babel, Ra's' conflict escalated to the Justice League.
Merlyn	Justice League of America #94 (November 1971)	When members of the League are on the trail of the League of Assassins, the Sensei assigns Merlyn to begin eliminating its members. Merlyn would return to face the Justice League as part of the Anti-Justice League and the Killer Elite.
Funky Flashman	Mister Miracle #6 (January–February 1972)	A con man, Flashman managed to take control of the Secret Society of Super Villains as the Wizard's puppet and has returned numerous times as a thorn in the side of Earth's heroes.
Starbreaker	Justice League of America #96 (February 1972)	An adult Sun-Eater, Starbreaker is an energy vampire of immense strength who consumes planets to sustain himself.
Nebula Man	Justice League of America #100 (August 1972)	The adult version of the universe of Qwewq, Neh-Buh-Loh has immense power, with his fate entwined with the Seven Soldiers of Victory as the lackey to Sheeda queen Gloriana Tenebrae. The League would enter Qwewq during its larval form and would face the adult version along with the Justice Society when it hurled the Seven Soldiers across time.
Morgaine le Fey	The Demon #1 (September 1972)	Primarily a foe to Etrigan the Demon, Morgaine would try to usurp Wonder Woman's role in the Trinity beside Enigma and Konvict who sought Batman and Superman's roles, respectively. Earth's heroes, led by the League, tried to stop her before and after their transformation.
Klarion the Witch Boy	The Demon #7 (March 1973)	Frequent sparring partner of Etrigan, Klarion joined with the Contessa during Young Justice: Sins of Youth to create distrust of young heroes and turned adult heroes (and some villains) into children and teenage heroes into adults.
Injustice Gang	Justice League of America #111 (May–June 1974)	The first group of the League's enemies to come together against them that has returned repeatedly, often led by Lex Luthor.
Libra	Justice League of America #111 (May–June 1974)	The original mastermind of the Injustice Gang, Libra would later become the prophet of Darkseid and organized Earth's villains during Final Crisis.
Anti-Justice League	Action Comics #443 (January 1975)	A group of the League's worst individual enemies organized by the Queen Bee that captured the entire League save for Superman, who outsmarted Brainiac and saved his allies.
Equalizer	Justice League of America #117 (April 1975)	Employing a plague that travels through being in the vicinity of someone infected, the Equalizer makes all those afflicted equal in power and ability.
Cary Bates	Justice League of America #123 (October 1975)	A comic book writer on Earth Prime who is transported to Earth-Two by the Cosmic Treadmill. Gaining mental powers from the transition, Bates falls under the thrall of the Wizard where he defeats the Justice Society, makes them appear as the Injustice Society, and has the heroes die at the hands of the Justice League.
Kobra	Kobra #1 (February 1976)	A vast, ancient criminal organization that crossed swords with Earth's heroes, targeting the League when they captured their headquarters on one occasion and shuffled their minds between their bodies on another.
Nekron	Justice League of America #128 (March 1976)	A fear parasite who destroyed entire worlds to feed on the fear that living creatures experience at their deaths.
Nekron	Tales of the Green Lantern Corps #1 (May 1981)	One of several embodiments of death, Nekron become aware of the main universe due to the machinations of Krona and sought to make it part of his realm of the dead. Originally stopped by the Green Lantern Corps, he would return during the events of Blackest Night.
Secret Society of Super Villains	Secret Society of Super Villains #1 (May 1976)	An ever-changing alliance of supervillains under several leaders during its existence that often blended major villains with lower-tier contemporaries.
Super Foes	Super Friends #1 (November 1976)	A group inspired by the Justice League and their mentorship of Wendy and Marvin to bring young people into the supervillain experience as a mentorship. Membership featured Poison Ivy, the Penguin, the Toyman, the Cheetah, the Human Flying Fish, and their sidekicks.
Manhunters	Justice League of America #140 (March 1977)	Former agents of the Guardians of the Universe, the Manhunters sought to discredit their Green Lantern Corps by framing Hal Jordan for destroying an inhabited planet, but are foiled by the Justice League. The Manhunters would return during the events of Millennium.
The Construct	Justice League of America #142 (May 1977)	An artificial intelligence born from the Earth's communication transmissions that tried to conquer Earth several times.
The Manhunter/the Privateer/the Star-Tsar	1st Issue Special #5 (August 1975) (as the Manhunter); Justice League of America #143 (June 1977) (as the Privateer); Justice League of America #149 (December 1977) (as the Star-Tsar)	One of the Terrans assimilated into the Manhunters, Mark Shaw battled the Justice League for his master's degree. However, he would turn on his order and became the hero the Privateer, infiltrating the Justice League. In reality, he was working under orders from the Key and was really the Star-Tsar (though a brainwashed Snapper Carr would also assume the identity). The Star-Tsar identity would later be adopted by astronomer Richard Rigel.
Menagerie Man	Super Friends #6 (August 1977)	Employing the same white dwarf star shrinking technology as the Atom, Wilson Gable trains animals, shrinks them, and carries them around to use in robberies.
Antithesis	Teen Titans #53 (February 1978)	Energy creature that feeds on negative emotion captured by the League that escaped later to dominate their minds. The group's teen sidekicks were forced to battle their mentors, exile Antithesis to Limbo, and afterward officially formed the Teen Titans.
Luck League	Justice League of America #151 (February 1978)	A group of individuals empowered by Professor Amos Fortune with similar powers to the Justice League that siphon the heroes' powers. Membership includes Acrobat, Racer, Strongman, Crier, Cyclone, Shrinking Man, and Water King.
Fiend with Five Faces	Justice League of America #156 (July 1978)	An amalgamation of five deities of Oceania (Rongo the Jester, Dangora the Wise, Ku the War God, Mauri the Love Goddess, and Tane the Nature God) four of which rise to cause anarchy on Earth.
Siren	Justice League of America #156 (July 1978)	An ancient love goddess of Oceania, Mauri enslaves the male members of the Justice League on the eve of Ray Palmer's nuptials to Jean Loring, forcing them to battle female contemporaries assembled for the event.
Legion of Doom	Challenge of the Super Friends (September 9, 1978)	Created for the Super Friends animated TV series, the Legion of Doom was composed of some of the League's worst individual nemeses. The team would make its canonical appearance under Brainwave Jr. against Extreme Justice, but the original line-up was an influence in stories like Justice, Injustice League Unlimited and Scott Snyder's Justice League series.
Anton Allegro	Justice League of America #163 (February 1979)	After being deafened by one of Green Arrow's sonic arrows, Russian musician the Amazing Allegro used a book of spells to make his synthesizer create demons when played to menace the Justice League of America. General Anton Gorki would later capture Allegro and employ his synthesizer against the Justice League.
Satin Satan	Justice League of America #179 (June 1980)	Operating out of the Studio, a local disco, Satin Satan is possessed by the demon Sataroth that has been kidnapping young people.
Garn Daanuth	Warlord #59 (July 1982)	Brother of Atlantean wizard Arion, he placed himself in suspended animation and fought the League, inevitably being destroyed by the team.

== Modern Age ==
Villain	First appearance	Description
Maximus Rex	Justice League of America #221 (December 1983)	Rex Rogan's company Repli-Tech Industries was going bankrupt and in a radical move he had himself and his board of directors turned into man-animal hybrids called the Ani-Men. Establishing a venue called the Arena, the Ani-Men slaughtered combatants for the amusement of the ultra-rich. When the League went to shut the operation down, its members were trounced by Rex and his forces. In a second battle, the League learned the process that transformed the Ani-Men was ongoing and inevitably the hybrids turned completely into mindless beasts.
Paragon	Justice League of America #224 (March 1984)	Able to duplicate and magnify the metahuman abilities of organic creatures in close vicinity of him, Joel Cochin sought to destroy all those he viewed as being inferior.
Fiatlux	Justice League of America #225 (April 1984)	Cult bent on world domination so far as to summon the demon Hellrazer, the deity Set, and genetically engineered dragons. Former leaders include Lords Gravesend, Arsenic, and Claw.
Hellrazer	Justice League of America #225 (April 1984)	A demon summoned by the cult of Fiatlux towards world domination that possessed Zatanna.
Marshal	Justice League of America #228 (July 1984)	Leader of the Mars II settlement; upon learning the Earth vessel Viking II had landed on Mars (which he observed as trying to steal Martian resources), the Marshal declared war on Earth.
Cadre	Justice League of America #235 (February 1985)	Formed by the powerful and malevolent Overmaster, they were his puppets to test a world's worthiness to exist. The group would later be called the Cadre of the Immortal.
Anti-Monitor	Crisis on Infinite Earths #6 (September 1985)	The force behind Crisis on Infinite Earths, the Anti-Monitor watched over the Anti-Matter Universe as the Monitor did with the multiverse created when Krona broke the taboo of watching the universe's creation. It would try to conquer the multiverse, but meet defeat and return due to the efforts of Alexander Luthor Jr. during Infinite Crisis and later become the Guardian of the Sinestro Corps and fuel for the Black Central Power Battery.
General Wade Eiling	Captain Atom #1 (March 1987)	An important figure in the Atom Project and Task Force X, Wade Eiling would actively engage the League after the Ultramarine Corps assisted him in obtaining one of the Shaggy Man bodies. Transplanting his brain successfully into it, he became the villainous General and faced the heroes repeatedly.
Maxwell Lord	Justice League #1 (May 1987)	A high level leader in Checkmate, Lord would have his mind controlled by Kilg%re to form a new version of the Justice League. He would stay on in his managerial capacity to make the team weak so that his plans to eliminate Earth's metahumans could be hastened. His efforts with the OMAC Project and having Superman slaughter his League teammates was interrupted when Wonder Woman murdered him.
Gray Man	Justice League #2 (June 1987)	A sorcerer given the power to collect the dream energy of those near death by the Laws of Order, but over time began to attack the living and caught the ire of Doctor Fate and his League colleagues.
Gray Man	Justice League America #31 (October 1989)	Replacing the original after his death, the second Gray Man decided to initiate suicide on a global scale with the help of Dr. Irwin Teasdale and savor the dream energy for himself to conquer the world and the cosmos. While the League tried to stop him, inevitably it was the intervention from the Lords of Chaos and Order and the Spectre that were able to defeat him. The Lords lobotomized the servant, who would now mindlessly attend to his duties.
Kilg%re	The Flash #3 (August 1987)	A mechanical alien lifeform who sought to dominate Earth's electrical systems. When this failed, it controlled Maxwell Lord's mind and sought to dominate the world through cunning by forming and controlling the Justice League.
Manga Khan	Justice League International #14 (June 1988)	An intergalactic trader who kidnapped Mister Miracle to open up trade with Apokolips and faced the Justice League who sought their friend.
Macrolatts	The Weird #1 (July 1988)	A race of malevolent beings who enslave and openly feed on the energy of the Zarolatts. When they seek to enter other realms for the purpose of conquest, a Zarolatt escapes, comes to Earth, and animates the dead body of Walter Langley. Dubbed the Weird, he seeks to warn the Justice League; however, two Macrolatts possess Superman and Nuklon, increasing and expanding their already significant powers. With the Weird, the League is able to triumph over the invaders and free their comrades.
Injustice League	Justice League International #23 (January 1989)	Historically, a group of D-list villains led by Major Disaster, but chronologically, a villainous group formed by the alien tyrant Agamemno and made up of some of the League's greatest individual nemeses. The group would later resurface led by Luthor, the Joker, and the Cheetah as a virtual army of villains.
Conglomerate	Justice League Quarterly #1 (Winter 1990)	A version of the Crime Syndicate for the Justice League at the time. Membership included Fiero, Frostbite, Elasti-Man, the Element Man, the Scarab, and Slipstream (analogies for Fire, Ice, Elongated Man, Metamorpho, Blue Beetle, and the Flash, respectively).
Mr. Nebula	Justice League America #36 (March 1990)	A parody of Galactus (even including a parody of Galactus' Herald the Silver Surfer called the Scarlet Skier), Nebula fancies himself an artist and redesigns entire worlds with his Nebulamobile.
Extremists	Justice League Europe #15 (June 1990)	A powerful group of villains from the planet Angor based on Doctor Doom, Magneto, Dormammu, Doctor Octopus, and Sabretooth. After their demise, Mitch Wacky built robotic duplicates of them for a theme park that became self-aware and traveled to Earth to battle their enemies Silver Sorceress and Blue Jay, who had joined the League. They would return repeatedly to face the League (once as part of the Cadre).
Doomsday	Superman: The Man of Steel #18 (November 1992)	An artifact of Krypton predating its society, Doomsday is the ultimate weapon that seeks Kryptonians and their demise at his hands. Arriving on Earth, he faces the League and defeats them chiefly. He would return on several occasions, sometimes against the League, much to their chagrin.
Doctor Destiny's Justice League	Justice League America #72 (March 1993)	An alternate reality Justice League created by Doctor Destiny that was ruthless in their pursuit of justice and featured the Martian Manhunter, Green Lantern, Hawkman, Flash, Atom, Red Tornado, Black Canary, Firestorm, and Green Arrow (who questioned the League's tactics). Batman was a member, but resigned when he saw the direction that the group was taking.
Aryan Nation	Justice League Task Force #10 (March 1994)	A team of white supremacists who faced the League and were later folded into the Cadre.
League Busters	Justice League International #65 (June 1994)	A United Nations sanctioned group composed mostly of villains, not unlike the Suicide Squad, formed in case the government needed to defeat the Justice League. Membership featured the Peacemaker, Ultraa, Mirror Master, Chromax, and Spellbinder.
Contessa	Superman: The Man of Tomorrow #1 (July 1995)	Erica Alexandra del Portenza is the ex-wife of Lex Luthor and mother to his daughter Lena Luthor. She claims to be over 1,900 years old, and the director of the Agenda, a clandestine organization for cloning and DNA modification that absorbed Darkseid's Evil Factory and rivals Project Cadmus. Originally an enemy to Superboy, they became a consistent threat to Young Justice and the Contessa sought to turn the public against the superhero community during Young Justice: Sins of Youth.
Killer Elite	Justice League America #105 (November 1995)	A grouping of some of the greatest assassins on Earth. The membership included Deadshot, Merlyn, Bolt, Deadline, and Chiller.
Neron	Underworld Unleashed #1 (November 1995)	A demon who largely acts in the role of the Biblical devil. His machinations, such as those during Underworld Unleashed, have brought him into conflict with the League.
Magog	Kingdom Come #1 (May 1996)	Harbinger of a new breed of dark heroes that murdered, he was the target of the reformation of the Justice League formed when Superman returned from retirement.
Know Man	Justice League: Midsummer's Nightmare #2 (October 1996)	An enigmatic alien who used Doctor Destiny to make the Justice League forget their past, while activating the metagenes of people on Earth at a rampant rate.
White Martians	JLA #1 (January 1997)	A warlike people of Mars; a group of them survived the devastation of Mars and arrived on Earth known as the Hyperclan to usurp the League's status and conquer Earth. Later, the race was revived by the Id and banished to the Phantom Zone, where Fernus slew them. Other White Martians emerged, such as hybrids made by A'monn A'mokk with the DNA of metahumans from Earth, several from some enemies of the League.
Asmodel	JLA #7 (July 1997)	Formerly the leader of the Bull-Host of the angels of Heaven, he has allied himself with Neron and faced the League several times.
Gog	New Year's Evil: Gog #1 (February 1998)	A man empowered by the Quintessence who traveled to parallel Earths and slayed the Superman therein, generally battling the League as well.
Prometheus	New Year's Evil: Prometheus #1 (February 1998)	When his sociopathic parents were gunned down at the end of a car chase before his eyes, the man who became Prometheus dedicated his life to crime, not unlike Bruce Wayne to law in the wake of a similar tragedy. With his Ghost Key to the Phantom Zone and a helmet storing the top 20 martial artists' skills, Prometheus would battle the League several times, including engineering the murder of Lian Harper. For a time, Chad Graham (trained as Prometheus' sidekick) took over his mentor's mantle when he was incapacitated and was murdered by the villain when he returned.
Julian September	JLA #18 (May 1998)	A quantum physicist and probability mathematician who discovered how to manipulate luck and used it to become President of the United States, a Nobel Peace Prize recipient, and other such accolades that sowed chaos on Earth in response.
Bedlam	JLA: World Without Grown-Ups #1 (July 1998)	An ancient power that feeds on dreams and wishes that possessed Matthew Stuart and would alter Earth to suit its will.
Superman	Tangent Comics: The Superman #1 (September 1998)	Harvey Dent developed phenomenal powers on an alternate Earth and uses his abilities to conquer his world and rule it as a tyrant to protect it from disorder and crime. When he learned of the League's Earth, he sought to conquer it as well and crossed swords with its heroes.
Ma'alefa'ak	Martian Manhunter #0 (October 1998)	The malevolent twin brother of Martian Manhunter, he was perverted by Darkseid into becoming his herald and engineered the plague known as H’Ronmeer's Curse that wiped out most of the Martians. When he arrived on Earth, he impersonated his sibling and attacked the League.
Solaris	DC One Million #1 (November 1998)	An artificial sun destined to be the nemesis to the Superman Dynasty who was the mastermind behind DC One Million, which teamed the Justice League with their future contemporaries in Justice Legion A.
Harm	Young Justice #4 (January 1999)	William "Billy" Hayes is a teenage psychotic empowered by the demon Buzz who aspired to be the greatest killer on Earth. To this end, he targeted Young Justice.
The Disciple	JLA: Primeval (1999)	Jerome Cox is allergic to the modern world and worships ancient powers, seeking to bring these Elder Gods to Earth. As the League tried to stop him, they were devolved to early versions of their species.
Mageddon	JLA #37 (January 2000)	A weapon of the Old Gods, it uses spores to engineer weakness in a world that it targets for destruction before using anti-sun technology to destroy the surrounding galaxy.
Imperiex	Superman (vol. 2) #153 (February 2000)	The embodiment of entropy, Imperiex controls an army of drones and seeks to destroy the universe and recreate it in his image. He forced an alliance among several worlds, including Earth and Apokolips.
Point Men	Young Justice #18 (March 2000)	A group of teenagers who the Agenda made from genetic material and cloned to destroy Young Justice. Membership includes the Gray Lady, Serpenteen, Blockade, Short Cut, the Blank Slate, and Groundswell.
Nergal	Green Lantern Annual #9 (September 2000)	An Oan who came to Earth, married his sister Ereskigal, and led an army of abominations crafted by his mother Tiamat. Worshiped as a god in ancient Babylon, he was banished to Kurnugi by the Oan Istar and the Terran Ninurta's army and remained until Istar's descendant Sala Nisaba unwittingly opened the door to the dimension with help from Kyle Rayner. She became trapped, but managed to free Kyle, who returned with the League to defeat Nergal and save Sala.
Queen of Fables	JLA #47 (November 2000)	Powerful sorceress from another dimension trapped in the Book of Fables by Snow White. Freed in modern times, the Queen transforms Manhattan and targets Wonder Woman (who bears a resemblance to Snow White) leading the League to battle the sorceress, trapping her again, but in a book on the United States tax code.
Baron Agua Sin Gaaz	Young Justice #24 (October 2000)	The grandfather of Young Justice member Empress, Gaaz murdered the heroine's parents, prompting an invasion by the Young Justice League into Zandia, haven for supervillains, to bring him to justice.
Centurion	JLA 80-Page Giant #3 (October 2000)	Accidentally created by the 100, the Centurion controlled a ghost army of soldiers throughout history and the Erasure Weapon, which would erase something and its entire history. However, when the former turned on him, he and his nemesis the Moon Maiden were wiped from history. The pair would return working together and garnered intergalactic armies to their cause, until the Moon Maiden's memories of her fellow Leaguers shocked her into defeating Centurion again.
Jadeth	JLA: Seven Caskets (2000)	An ancient, evil ruler of great mystic power who betrayed seven monstrous kings and went into hibernation for millions of years. Her return was stopped when the Justice League merged with the spirits of the evil kings and Superman took her power, splitting it among his teammates. The act proved shocking to Jadeth, seeing evil power used in such an opposing manner, and she returned to her sleep.
Advance Man	Justice Leagues: JL? #1 (March 2001)	An alien being who is commissioned to prepare planets for invasion by weakening its defenses. Using Hector Hammond, he attempted to make the people of Earth forget the existence of the Justice League. However, Hammond caught on to his scheme and left a suggestion of a 'Justice League of A...' in the minds of the group's charter members. This led to numerous Justice Leagues of different As (Aliens, Arkham, Amazons, Atlantis, Apostles, Anarchy, Adventure, and Air) which inconvenienced the Advance Man until their memories returned and they toppled the alien.
Manchester Black	Action Comics #775 (March 2001)	Originally an antihero who formed the Elite, Black's failure to pervert Superman and his ideals led him to suicide. However, perhaps as being a powerful psionic, his mind survived and retreated to his sister Vera Black's mind. He would begin to subvert Vera, until during a mission of the Justice League Elite he took over her body and enslaved the powerful being Eve. Only the combined efforts of the two Justice Leagues were able to defeat him.
Diablos	JLA: Black Baptism #1 (May 2001)	A host of demons who pattern themselves after the Mafia and seek to go up in rank among the demons of Hell. Led by the Enchantress (in the guise of succubus Anita Soulfeeda), they are manipulated by Hermes Trismegistus (in possession of Felix Faust's body) into stealing the magic energies of denizens on Earth in order to cleanse the world of humanity. Membership includes Nicky the Fork, Big Luci, Deuce, Scratch, and Samhein Diablo.
Cathexis	JLA #52 (May 2001)	The Cathexis are an advanced and powerful race from the sixth dimension. Wishing to expand their power, they create Id, a sentient energy field capable of modifying reality to grant wishes.
Id	JLA #53 (June 2001)	A sentient energy created by the Cathexis able to turn wishes into reality. Id was unleashed on Earth granting wishes in ironic, malevolent ways including making a wish of Superman materialize as separating the League between their dual identities in physical manifestations.
Anathema	Haven: The Broken City #1 (February 2002)	A geneticist on Competalia who developed a process to give people superpowers and used it to become their ruler and developed a super army. Her enemies were placed in a prison called Haven, who transformed the facility into a starship and escaped to Earth, where they were given asylum. Anathema followed and began empowering humans to become a power source for a teleportation device to bring her legions to Earth, but her plans were foiled by the League and the Alliance of Haven and she was destroyed by one of her former associates.
Rama Khan	JLA #62 (March 2002)	Title to the ruler and protector of Jarhanpur, Rama Khan can bend the elements of the land to his every whim. When an infant was chosen as the successor to the position and kidnapped, the League battled Khan to reclaim the child.
Gamemnae	JLA #69 (September 2002)	Born to Atlantis with blond hair, a taboo due to the Curse of Kordax, she was exiled and returned as a powerful sorceress who came to rule her people. She had planned to conquer the world until Aquaman and the people of present-day Atlantis arrived in her time, sent to the past by Tempest during Our Worlds at War to save them from Imperiex. Imprisoning Aquaman and enslaving the future Atlanteans, she formed a League of Ancients to destroy the Justice League in a preemptive strike for when they tried to save their comrade. When the League comes to the past to face her, she does battle in the present with a reserve League established by Batman.
League of Ancients	JLA #70 (October 2002)	Inspired by the Justice League, Gamemnae assembled Rama Khan, Manitou Raven, the Anointed One, the Whaler, Tezumak, and Sela under the false pretense of a peacekeeping force, but really to destroy the League. All of the members except for Raven were absorbed by Gamemnae.
Cold Warriors	Justice League Adventures #12 (December 2002)	A grouping of cold-themed villains, including Mr. Freeze, Captain Cold, Killer Frost, Minister Blizzard, Icicle, Snowman, Cryonic Man, and Polar Lord. A similar group appeared in Justice League of America #139 (February 1977), made up of Captain Cold, Icicle, and Minister Blizzard. Another group called the Ice Pack appeared in Super Friends #16 (August 2009) featuring Mister Freeze, Captain Cold, Killer Frost, Minister Blizzard, the Icicle and Blue Snowman.
Lady Zand	Young Justice #50 (December 2002)	Believed to be over 800 years old, Lady Zand claims to have founded the nation of Zandia. She can become the very soil of her country and manipulate the land to her whim.
Axis Amerika	JLA #81 (July 2003)	Created by the Clockwatchers, this group of fascists operated out of the Safe Haven Children's Home. They were used by Manson in an attempt to reclaim Faith and discredit the League.
Fernus	JLA #85 (November 2003)	A genetic backdoor in Martian DNA to their previous experience as the Burning. When the Martian Manhunter overcame his fear of fire, it set free the Fernus persona present in every one of his race's DNA. Nihilistic and seeking to reproduce asexually, Fernus sought to bathe the Earth in fire and death.
Crucifer	JLA #94 (May 2004)	Leader of a vampire coven called the Tenth Circle that abducted children from around the globe and came into conflict with the Justice League and the Doom Patrol.
Red King	JLA Secret Files and Origins 2004 (November 2004)	Darrin Profitt absconded with Doctor Destiny's Materioptikon, created multiple realities, observed the outcomes to provide himself a direct path to all of his desires (including a technologically advanced suit of armor) and developed metahuman abilities. Seeking to defeat the League and conquer Earth, he maintained three realities of himself to give him good odds, with a fourth dubbed Fallback should all others fail.
Aftermath	Justice League Elite #6 (February 2005)	Leader of an intergalactic drug gang of the same name, Aftermath sought power in the Source Wall, but was instead absorbed, freeing Eve.
Eve	Justice League Elite #8 (April 2005)	A mysterious being of great power able to alter reality. It was sealed in the Source Wall, released when Aftermath entered it and her mind controlled by Manchester Black (who had possessed his sister Vera). The pair went to Earth and created global havoc, laying waste to the JLA. Eve destroyed herself when Vera was able to regain control of her own mind.
Void Hound	JLA #111 (April 2005)	An ancient weapon of Qward built on the legend of the dark god Erdammeru, the Void Hound was so advanced that no crew of Qwardians could pilot it. Instead, when a sentient mind emerged from Qward's vast communication web, they were able to capture it and use it to give their weapon an intellect able to control it, but it proved too powerful for the Weaponers of Qward to tame and was sealed away. After being awakened, the Void Hound merged with Enigma's deceased daughter to become a force for good on the Anti-Matter Earth.
Power Posse	JLA Classified #8 (August 2005)	Similar to the Crime Syndicate, the Power Posse was an evil version of the Super Buddies based out of a strip club. The group included a gigantic monstrous G'nort, Mary Marvel as a dominatrix named Mistress Mary and her submissive brother Billy, Ice as a sociopathic stripper named Tiffany, bartender Booster Gold, ticket taker Oberon, and bouncer Metamorpho, led by the sleazy Max Lord and his moll Sue (née Dibny).
Hypothetical Army	JLA Classified #16 (March 2006)	Led by General Dvory Tuzik and created by Sybil the Hypothetical Woman, the group defeated the Chinese army and trounced the Justice League until the timely arrival of Superman and the Martian Manhunter. Membership included Ghost Lion, Marieke, Soldat, Jin Si, Dybbuk, and Velocista.
Kid Amazo	JLA Classified #37 (June 2007)	The next evolutionary step in Amazo, Ivo created a new model of the android that combined his best-known creation with the DNA of his daughter Sara. Sending the creation to live with human parents as Frank Halloran, Amazo would reclaim his 'progeny', only for the boy to be conflicted with the sudden change in his life. Able to mimic both powers and minds, Kid Amazo was defeated when the League openly bickered and he exploded from the contention.
Titus	JLA Classified #51 (March 2008)	A self-styled god who travels between planets seeking out other 'gods' to battle, kill, and earn worship from his triumph.
Anansi	Justice League of America #24 (October 2008)	The African spider trickster god residing in Vixen's Tantu Totem able to change reality by weaving stories at his own discretion. Beyond this, he can manipulate those that drawn power from the Red.
Titans	Titans: Villains for Hire Special #1 (July 2010)	Mercenaries led and organized by Deathstroke. After assassinating the Atom (Ryan Choi) on behalf of Dwarfstar, the group is targeted by Ray Palmer and the Justice League. Membership includes Cheshire, the Tattooed Man, Osiris, Cinder, and Arsenal.
Omega Man	Justice League of America #50 (December 2010)	A leftover device of Alexander Luthor Jr. is spewing dark energy damaging the multiverse, including the Anti-Matter Earth and Earth-9, and the Crime Syndicate hire Doctor Impossible to hijack a Resurrection Machine and return Alexander to life in order to stop it. Instead, he tries to bring back Darkseid, but the machine instead gives the dark energy substance, possessing the body of the Hunter (an evil version of Orion) and creating the Omega Man. With an insatiable thirst for energy, the Omega Man has no choice but to feed on all before him.

== The New 52 ==
Villain	First appearance	Description
Peraxxus	Justice League International #2 (December 2011)	The leader of the Signal Men and destroyer of worlds.
David Graves	Justice League #6 (April 2012)	David Graves was a historian and published author, interested in fringe history. He wrote a series of books, on subjects such as Atlantis, the miracles of Fatima, the Nazca Lines, and how they could affect the modern world. During the very first adventure of the Justice League, David, his wife Jennifer, and his two children, Jason and Emma, came under attack by Darkseid's forces. Accepting what he believed to be his fate, and covering his children's eyes for their inevitable death, Graves and his family are saved by the superheroes who would eventually become the Justice League. However, they all are affected by an unknown disease; as the only one still alive he holds the Justice League responsible and seeks revenge on them.
Nick Necro	Justice League Dark (vol. 1) #0 (November 2012)	Once a mentor to John Constantine and also Zatanna's lover, Nick Necro was the world top magician before his obsession with the Books of Magic led to a dark path. After discovering Constantine and Zatanna are romantically involved he tries to kill them, but ends up having his soul sent to Hell. Necro is resurrected through a pact with Felix Faust and resumes both the search for the books and revenge against the ones who betrayed him.
Grail	Forever Evil #8 (May 2014)	Darkseid's daughter, born to Amazonian assassin Myrina on the same day as Wonder Woman's birth. She is prophesied to cause great destruction at the behest of the Anti-Monitor.

== DC Rebirth/DC Universe ==
Villain	First appearance	Description
Barbatos	Dark Days: The Casting #1 (September 2017)	An ancient God-Monster from the Dark Multiverse. He had first noticed Bruce Wayne when he slipped through time and now has finally arrived in the DC universe.
Omega Titans	DC Nation (vol. 2) #0 (May 2018)	The Omega Titans are eons-old entities believed to have created life in the Prime Universe, only to consume it at the end of the Universe, to determine which of their nature had had the most impact on the Universe: their names are Mystery, Entropy, Wisdom and Wonder.
Umbrax	Justice League (vol. 4) #3 (July 2018)	A sentient black sun powering the Ultraviolet Invisible Spectrum. It was discovered by Sinestro, who became the first Ultraviolet Lantern.
Perpetua	Justice League (vol. 4) #8 (October 2018)	The first creator and the mother of the Monitor, Anti-Monitor, and World Forger. She was sealed in the Source Wall and forced to watch as her children grew weak without her guiding hand. Perpetua is the most feared being in the greater Omniverse, out of all her brothers and sisters tending the infinite Multiverses.
Triumvirate of Sea Gods	Justice League (vol. 4) #10 (December 2018)	Ocean deities from other galaxies with an ancient grudge against Poseidon and Arion; composed of Captain Gall, Commander Drogue and Fleet Admiral Tyyde.
World Forger	Justice League (vol. 4) #21 (April 2019)	The first son of Perpetua, brother to the Monitor and the Anti-Monitor. He was the one who creates form from idea and hammers everything into existence. He would later help the Justice League in their fight against Perpetua.
Frost King	Justice League: Endless Winter #1 (February 2021)	A being from the 10th century with cryogenic powers who was defeated by Black Adam, Hippolyta, the Swamp Thing and the Viking Prince. He then returned many years in the future with the use of Kryptonian crystal remains from the Fortress of Solitude and set out to find his family.

== See also ==
- List of Batman family enemies
- List of Superman enemies
- List of Wonder Woman enemies
- List of Flash enemies
- List of Green Lantern enemies
- List of Aquaman enemies
