= Major Disaster =

- Major Disaster in his classic costume as depicted in Justice League International #23 (March 1989). Art by Kevin Maguire

Publication information
- Publisher: DC Comics
- First appearance: Green Lantern #43 (March 1966)
- Created by: Gardner Fox; Gil Kane

In-story information
- Alter ego: Paul Booker
- Species: Metahuman
- Team affiliations: Army of Crime; Justice League Antarctica; Injustice League; Suicide Squad; SKULL; Justice League Elite; Justice League
- Notable aliases: Bennett Brodsky
- Abilities: Probability manipulation; Force field generation; Chaos sensing; Chaos manipulation; Disaster inducement

Major Disaster (Paul Booker) is a fictional character appearing in American comic books published by DC Comics. He started out as an enemy of Green Lantern and the Justice League before reforming and becoming a superhero.

== Publication history ==
Major Disaster first appeared in Green Lantern (volume 2) #43, and was created by Gardner Fox and Gil Kane.

== Fictional character biography ==
Paul Booker is a low-level crook who accidentally discovers the secret identities of Green Lantern (Hal Jordan) and the Flash after finding Thomas Kalmaku's casebook. He then becomes a criminal using devices that can create natural disasters and protect him from them. After Major Disaster is defeated, Green Lantern uses his ring to erase the memory of the Flash's secret identity and placed a mental block stopping him from telling anyone else about the Green Lantern's own identity. Major Disaster continues to battle Green Lantern and allies with Epoch.

Major Disaster's debut. Art by Murphy Anderson.

Major Disaster later learns that he has gained his device's power innately, but his powers are growing in magnitude and slowly destroying him. For a time, he serves as an operative of the international crime cartel SKULL.

While in prison, Major Disaster meets Mighty Bruce, a computer wizard who steals money from corporations to give to charity. Bruce and Disaster form the Injustice League alongside Multi-Man, Cluemaster, Big Sir, and Clock King and obtain a Thanagarian warship left over from a recent invasion. Guy Gardner intercepts the group's radio transmission, destroys the warship, and takes the League into custody.

Once free, the League decides to move to Paris, but is confronted by Justice League Europe and quickly deported. Their next mission involves breaking into the League's casino on the island Kooey Kooey Kooey. While the operation is a success, they are unable to spend their winnings; Kooey Kooey Kooey is revealed to be sentient and drifts into the ocean. Recruited by the JLA, Disaster helps Aquaman anchor Kooey Kooey Kooey to an underground volcano. He chooses to stay and face justice rather than flee, despite having the opportunity to do so.

Attempting to go legit, the Injustice League are sent to the South Pole to form the Justice League Antarctica, along with G'nort and the Scarlet Skier. After inadvertently devastating Times Square during a battle with Despero, Major Disaster leaves the League.

The Injustice League team receives an offer from the government to work on the Suicide Squad. They are sent to a small island off the coast of Iceland to deal with a terrorist situation and an out-of-control genetic experiment, during which Big Sir is killed and Multi-Man, Clock King, and Cluemaster are injured.

After the Justice League are lost in time and presumed dead, Batman recruits Major Disaster into a substitute Justice League group consisting of Nightwing, Green Arrow, Atom, Hawkgirl, Firestorm, Jason Blood, and Faith. Major Disaster later joins the Justice League Elite, a covert-ops arm of the Justice League led by Vera Black. Major Disaster is revealed to be alcoholic; during a battle with the Justice Society of America, he uses his powers while drunk, resulting in Hawkgirl being severely injured and Manitou Raven killed. At the end of the Justice League Elite series, Major Disaster resigns from the League.

In Infinite Crisis, Major Disaster is killed by Superboy-Prime. He is later resurrected as a Black Lantern during the Blackest Night event and attempts to seek revenge before Prime kills him using a black ring.

In 2011, The New 52 rebooted the DC universe. Major Disaster returned in Superman/Wonder Woman confronting the heroes alongside the Atomic Skull.

In 2016, DC Comics implemented a relaunch of its books called "DC Rebirth" which restored its continuity to a form much as it was prior to "The New 52". Major Disaster is revealed to have a daughter named Penny who debuted as Minor Disaster in the Harley Quinn comic, utilizing a H-Dial-resembling device called the Disaster Dial and teaming up with her neglectful father.

== Powers and abilities ==
Major Disaster's powers originally came from a set of weapons he used to cause natural disasters. Over time, exposure to these weapons made the powers internalize and now Disaster can cause chaos at will. Disaster later makes a deal with Neron that greatly enhances his powers, enabling him to see the strands of chaos around him. The disasters he can now control theoretically range from being able to command asteroid showers without breaking a sweat to causing heart attacks, nose bleeds, and even making people trip up. He appears to have no real limitations, though he lacks fine control. He has devised a force field for himself, using his powers to redirect attacks, though he seems not to use it much. While Major Disaster is adept at creating chaos, it takes him great effort to stop disasters, whether his own or natural.

== In other media ==
- Major Disaster makes non-speaking cameo appearances in Justice League Unlimited as a member of Gorilla Grodd's Secret Society before being killed by Darkseid.
- Major Disaster appears in Batman: The Brave and the Bold, voiced by James Arnold Taylor.
- Major Disaster appears as a character summon in Scribblenauts Unmasked: A DC Comics Adventure.
