= Alliance (comics) =

Alliance, in comics, may refer to:

- Alliance (DC Comics), a group of fictional aliens
- The Alliance (Image Comics), a 1995 3-issue mini-series from Image Comics

It may also refer to:

- Alliance of Evil, a group of Marvel Comics supervillains
- Hero Alliance, a series that have been published by a number of companies include Innovation Publishing
- Rebel Alliance, a group from Star Wars that have appeared in the comic book adaptations

== See also ==
- Alliance (disambiguation)
- ComicsAlliance, a website devoted to comic books
