= Aquarius =

Aquarius may refer to:

== Astrology ==
- Aquarius (astrology), an astrological sign
- Age of Aquarius, a time period in the cycle of astrological ages

== Astronomy ==
- Aquarius (constellation)
- Aquarius in Chinese astronomy

== Arts and entertainment ==
=== Film and television ===
- Aquarius (film), a 2016 Brazilian–French drama film
- Aquarius (British TV series), a British arts television series
- Aquarius (American TV series), an American period crime drama television series

=== Music ===
- Aquarius (opera), by Karel Goeyvaerts
- Aquarius (Aqua album), 2000
- Aquarius (Haken album), 2010
- Aquarius (Nicole Mitchell album), 2013
- Aquarius (Tinashe album), 2014
- Aquarius (EP), by Boards of Canada, 1998
- "Aquarius", song from the 1967 musical Hair
- "Aquarius/Let the Sunshine In", 5th Dimension medley of two songs from the musical Hair, 1969
- "Aquarius", a song by Within Temptation from the 2004 album The Silent Force
- "Aquarius (equalty is right)", a song by Gary Fane, 1980

==== Other uses in music ====
- Aquarius Musikindo, an Indonesian music company

=== Other uses in arts and entertainment ===
- Aquarius (game), a card game published by Looney Labs
- Aquarius (Marvel Comics), various Marvel Comics characters
- Aquarius (DC Comics), a DC Comics character
- Aquarius Festival, Australian alternative festival in early 1970s
- Aquarius (sculpture), a 1969–1970 sculpture by Jerome Kirk

== Places ==
- Aquarius Casino Resort, Laughlin, Nevada, U.S.
- Aquarius Mountains, Arizona, U.S.

== Science and technology ==
- Aquarius (bug), a genus of aquatic bug
- Aquarius (plant), a genus of aquatic plants
- Aquarius Reef Base, an underwater laboratory located in the Florida Keys National Marine Sanctuary
- Aquarius (SAC-D instrument), on board the SAC-D spacecraft
- Aquarius (rocket), a low-cost launch vehicle concept
- Aquarius, the lunar module of Apollo 13
- Mattel Aquarius, an early brand of home computers

== Watercraft ==
- Aquarius 21, an American sailboat design
- Aquarius 23, an American sailboat design
- Aquarius Dignitus, formerly Aquarius 2 and Aquarius, a 1977-built dual-flagged search and rescue vessel
- Aquarius (yacht), a 92 m (302 ft) luxury yacht (superyacht)
- MS Pearl Seaways (MS Aquarius in 2001), a cruiseferry owned by DFDS Seaways
- SuperStar Aquarius, a cruise ship owned and operated by Star Cruises
- USS Aquarius (AKA-16), an Andromeda-class attack cargo ship in the service of the United States Navy
- pl:ORP Wodnik, a training ship in the Polish navy

== Other uses ==
- Aquarius (drink)
- Aquarius, penname of Lewis H. Morgan (1818–1881), American anthropologist and social theorist

== See also ==
- Age of Aquarius (disambiguation)
- Aquarium (disambiguation)
- Aquarian (disambiguation)
- Aquarii, name given to the Christians who substituted water for wine in the Eucharist
- Water carrier
