= Age of Aquarius (disambiguation) =

Age of Aquarius is the current or forthcoming astrological age.

Age of Aquarius or The Age of Aquarius may refer to:

- The Age of Aquarius (album), by The 5th Dimension, 1969
  - "The Age of Aquarius", an alternative title of "Aquarius/Let the Sunshine In"
- Age of Aquarius (Perturbator album), 2025
- Age of Aquarius (Revolution Renaissance album), 2009, and the title track
- "Age of Aquarius", 2019 single by Cake (band)

== See also ==
- Aquarius (disambiguation)
- Aquarian Age (disambiguation)
