= Aquarian =

Aquarian may refer to:

- Aquarius (astrology), a sign of the zodiac
- Aquarian Tabernacle Church, a Wiccan church in Index, Washington, U.S.
- The Aquarian Weekly, a weekly newspaper in New Jersey, U.S.
- Aquarii, Christians who substituted water for wine in the eucharist
- The Aquarians, a 1970 American television action film
- The Aquarians, an alternate title for the 1970 film Ghetto Freaks
- The Aquarians, a band with Razzy Bailey

== See also ==
- Aquarian Age (disambiguation)
- Aquarius (disambiguation)
- The Aquarian Gospel of Jesus the Christ, a 1908 book by Levi H. Dowling
- Aquarian illusion, a metamorphosis (illusion)
- Soulquarians, a band
- Wundarr the Aquarian, a fictional character in Marvel comics
