= Aquarius (comics) =

Aquarius, in comics, may refer to:

- Aquarius (Marvel Comics), a Marvel Comics character
- Aquarius (DC Comics), a DC Comics villain
