= Big Sir (character) =

- Big Sir as depicted in Who's Who: The Definitive Directory of the DC Universe #2 (April 1985). Art by Carmine Infantino (penciler) and Klaus Janson (inker).

Publication information
- Publisher: DC Comics
- First appearance: The Flash #338 (October 1984)
- Created by: Cary Bates, Carmine Infantino

In-story information
- Full name: Dufus P. Ratchett
- Species: Metahuman
- Team affiliations: Injustice League; Justice League Antarctica; Suicide Squad
- Abilities: Superhuman strength; Wields powered armor

Big Sir (Dufus Ratchett) is a fictional DC Comics character. He first appeared in The Flash #338 (October 1984).

Big Sir appears in the fourth season of The Flash, portrayed by Bill Goldberg.

== Fictional character biography ==
Dufus P. Ratchett was born with a malformed pituitary gland that caused him to grow to incredible proportions, but left him mentally handicapped. Ratchett is hired by the Rogues, who give him a high-tech suit of armor created by the Monitor that renders him susceptible to telepathic suggestion. Big Sir is told that the Flash had attacked the Rogues and hurt a mouse. Enraged, Big Sir ambushes the Flash and strikes him in the head with his energy flail, injuring his face. With the last of his strength, Flash runs to Gorilla City, where his injuries are healed by Solovar and a medical team. Returning to Central City, the Flash subdues Big Sir and takes him to Gorilla City, where his mental deficiencies are corrected.

Big Sir's mind later inexplicably returns to its previous state, and he joins the Injustice League, led by Major Disaster. The League later briefly becomes Justice League Antarctica before their base is destroyed in a battle with flesh-eating penguins. Big Sir is fired by Maxwell Lord, but is given financial compensation.

Big Sir joins the Suicide Squad in return for a pardon, along with most of his Injustice League teammates. They are sent to deal with a hostage situation on a small island in Iceland. During the battle, Big Sir encounters a genetically engineered biological form in shape of a small child. He picks the creature up, believing it to be a real child, but it explodes in his arms, killing him instantly.

Big Sir is resurrected following The New 52 and DC Rebirth relaunches.

== Powers and abilities ==
Due to his size, Big Sir possesses physical power greater than that of a normal human being. He has an electronic flail that emits energy and enables him to fly via propulsion.

== In other media ==
Big Sir appears in The Flash, portrayed by Bill Goldberg. This version is David P. Ratchett, a human inmate of Iron Heights Penitentiary of normal intelligence who was indebted to Henry Allen before saving his son Barry from the other inmates. After discovering that Ratchett was framed by Sylbert Rundine, Barry works to free him before transporting him to Jiaju, China.
