= The Aquarians =

1970 American television

- Written by: Alan Caillou; Winston Miller
- Starring: Leslie Nielsen
- Country of origin: United States
- Original language: English

Original release
- Network: NBC
- Release: October 24, 1970

The Aquarians is a 1970 American television action film directed by Don McDougall. It stars Ricardo Montalbán, José Ferrer and Leslie Nielsen.
