= Etrigan the Demon =

Fictional character

- Etrigan as depicted in Action Comics Weekly #638 (February 1989). Art by Jack Kirby.

Publication information
- Publisher: DC Comics
- First appearance: The Demon #1 (September 1972)
- Created by: Jack Kirby

In-story information
- Alter ego: Etrigan; Jason Blood
- Species: Demon (Etrigan); Human (Jason Blood)
- Place of origin: Hell (Etrigan); Camelot (Jason Blood)
- Team affiliations: Justice League Dark; Demon Knights; Justice League United; Justice League
- Partnerships: Madame Xanadu
- Notable aliases: The Demon (Etrigan); Jason Blood, Jason of Norwich (Jason Blood)
- Abilities: Demon physiology; Superhuman strength, speed, stamina, durability, agility, and senses; Immortality; Regenerative healing factor; Energy blasts; Pyrokinesis; Hellfire projection; Flame breath; Precognition; Magic; (Etrigan): Expert in witchcraft and maleficium; Telepathy; Master martial artist and swordsman; (Jason Blood)

Etrigan the Demon is a superhero appearing in American comic books published by DC Comics. Created by Jack Kirby, Etrigan is a demon from Hell who, despite his violent tendencies, usually finds himself allied with the forces of good, mainly because of the alliance between the heroic characters of the DC Universe and Jason Blood, a human to whom Etrigan is bound. Etrigan is commonly depicted as a muscular humanoid creature with orange or yellow skin, horns, red eyes, and pointed, webbed ears, who frequently speaks in rhymes. The character was originally based in Gotham City, leading to numerous team-ups with Batman.

Since his conception, Etrigan has been adapted into several forms of media outside of comics, including animated series, films, and video games. He is voiced by Michael T. Weiss in the DC Animated Universe, Dee Bradley Baker in Batman: The Brave and the Bold, Patrick Seitz in Justice League Action, and Ray Chase in the DC Animated Movie Universe.

== Creation ==
Kirby's former assistant, Mark Evanier, said that Carmine Infantino asked Jack Kirby to create a new monster hero. Kirby or Infantino mentioned a demon, and Kirby from that point worked on creating a demonic character. Evanier said that he was with Kirby and several others during a dinner at a restaurant, and Kirby came up with Etrigan's name, back story, and motivations on the spot. Kirby intended to create the character but pass him off to others to write and draw. However, Infantino convinced him to make the first issue and made the decision final by suspending Kirby's unprofitable Fourth World comics series. Kirby then moved full-time to the Demon series.

== Publication history ==
Etrigan first appeared in The Demon #1 (September 1972) and was created by Jack Kirby. He created him at the behest of DC, who saw it as likely to be more commercially successful than the Fourth World and cancelled New Gods and Forever People to facilitate work on the new title. According to Evanier, Kirby had no interest in horror comics, but created Etrigan in response to DC's demand for a horror character. Kirby was annoyed that Etrigan's popularity forced him to abandon the Fourth World titles before he was done with them.

Etrigan returned for a four-issue miniseries in 1987, written and illustrated by Matt Wagner. Alan Grant followed this with an Etrigan feature in Action Comics Weekly #636-641 and a second ongoing title in 1990. The 1990 series lasted 58 issues, two Annuals and one #0 issue. Garth Ennis took over the title beginning with issue #40. Ennis' run included the first appearance of his character Hitman. This series was followed by a miniseries, Driven Out. Following this, John Byrne's Blood of the Demon lasted 17 issues, and ignored much of the continuity that took place after Kirby's initial run.

While his first monthly comic book series was short-lived, and his second was canceled after five years, Etrigan remains a popular supporting character with occasional additional miniseries. Series in which Etrigan has appeared include Alan Moore's Swamp Thing, Neil Gaiman's The Sandman, Kevin Smith's Green Arrow and Batman: The Widening Gyre, Garth Ennis's Hitman, and Cosmic Odyssey by Jim Starlin and Mike Mignola.

=== The New 52 ===
In The New 52 rebooted continuity, DC Comics launched a new series featuring Etrigan titled Demon Knights, which debuted on September 14, 2011. It was written by Paul Cornell and drawn by Diógenes Neves.

On October 11, 2025, it was announced that Etrigan would receive a new ongoing series as part of the "DC Next Level" publishing initiative. In July 2026, at San Diego Comic-Con, The Demon was announced to be written by James Harren and debut on October 7, 2026.

== Fictional character biography ==
=== Pre/Post-Crisis ===
Etrigan, son of the demon Belial, is summoned by the wizard Merlin, his half-brother. Unable to gain the creature's secrets, he binds the demon to Jason Blood, an arrogant knight in King Arthur's Camelot. This renders Jason immortal, which he alternately considers either a penance or a curse.

In modern times, Jason Blood resurfaces as a prominent demonologist in Gotham City. He is called to the crypt of Merlin and discovers a poem that causes him to switch places with Etrigan (appearing to transform him into Etrigan). To his misfortune, he is followed by the long-lived Morgaine le Fey, who lusts for Merlin's secrets. Over the years, Etrigan both clashes with and occasionally aids Earth's heroes, guided by his own whims and Blood's attempts to use his power for good.

Some time after his first appearance, Etrigan begins speaking in rhyme due to a promotion in Hell, though he is not limited to rhyme. He leads the forces of Hell in a battle against the Great Evil Beast and is in brief contact with the entity in its questions about its nature - he barely survives the attempt. His high rank would also see him guide Dream of the Endless from Hell's gates to Lucifer.

Some time after this, Jason Blood and Glenda Mark attempt to separate Blood and Etrigan, an event which leads to Blood's ally, Harry Matthews, being devoured, and later turned into a pillow, by Belial. At the end of these events, Etrigan and Blood are separated. However, both begin to age rapidly without Blood's curse to sustain them. During the Cosmic Odyssey event, Blood and Etrigan are reunited.

After the remerging, the relationship between Blood and Etrigan becomes even more contentious. Drawn to Hell by the Archfiend Asteroth, Etrigan stops Asteroth's attempt to sacrifice Glenda Mark, Randu Singh, Merlin and Blood himself (in Hell, Blood and Etrigan were, at the time, separated). Etrigan followed these events by overthrowing the triumvirate of leaders in Hell (Lucifer, Belial and Beezlebub) and taking the symbol of authority in Hell, the Crown of Horns, for himself. Separated from Blood via the Crown's power and about to destroy him, Merlin reminded Blood of his own power. Jason Blood speaks the incantation and remerges with Etrigan, with both returning to Earth. There, he fought Lobo, Klarion the Witch Boy and his gang and was drawn into the Realm Beyond, where he met the Thing-That-Cannot-Die and was reunited with his older brother, Lord Scapegoat.

Upon escape from the Realm Beyond, Etrigan and Blood agree to work together and team with Batman and Robin against the Howler. Soon after, Etrigan is chosen as a political candidate for President of the United States and nearly succeeds in securing the Republican nomination from George H. W. Bush. During his political run, he attempts to gain Superman's endorsement, but is denied it.

Blood and Mark later have a daughter named Kathryn. Knowing Etrigan will not tolerate such a distraction, Blood hires hitman Tommy Monaghan to kill the demon. After a battle against both Merlin and Etrigan, the two of them rescue Kathryn and Blood steals Etrigan's heart, essentially neutralizing him and binding him to Blood's will. At the end of the battle, Blood leaves Kathryn with her mother, hoping that she never meets him. Following these events, Etrigan becomes listless and ceases to rhyme. When Monaghan needs an edge against the demon Mawzir, he cons Blood into returning to Gotham and using Etrigan to retrieve the Ace of Winchesters, an anti-demon rifle, from Hell, all while preparing to force Blood to return Etrigan to Earth. Despite the risk of Etrigan killing him in vengeance, Monahgan trades Etrigan his heart for the Ace of Winchesters, once more forcing Blood to have the full burden of their merging and returning Etrigan to his full strength.

When the Justice League vanishes during their attempt to rescue Aquaman from the past, Batman's emergency program — designed to assemble a substitute Justice League in the event that the originals were ever killed — selects Jason Blood as the team's magic expert. Batman creates a pre-recorded message assuring Blood that he will not give Etrigan the keys to the Watchtower unless he is certain that he can be controlled. During the subsequent fight with Gamemnae, Blood sacrifices himself to free Zatanna from her control. However, he escapes Gamemnae's quagmire spell thanks to Martian Manhunter telepathically prompting his transformation into Etrigan. The crisis resolved, Blood passes his duties as the League's magic expert to Manitou Raven before departing.

The series Blood of the Demon, plotted and drawn by John Byrne and scripted by Will Pfeifer, began in May 2005. Etrigan apparently loses the restrictions imposed upon him by the wizard Merlin which turned him from evil, caused by his "murder" at the exact moment he was transforming from Jason Blood into his demon self. The incident resulted in Blood being able to exert some will over Etrigan's violent nature, whereas previously the two remained separate. Blood of the Demon ended with issue #17 in July 2006.

Etrigan later attempts to use the Trident of Lucifer to take control of Hell. A makeshift Shadowpact team successfully takes the Trident from him and flees to the supernatural Oblivion Bar. Etrigan follows and battles the team inside the bar. He is turned into stone via magical pistols and is used as a hat rack. The pistols' magic would return Etrigan to normal at sunrise, which never happens within the bar.

Etrigan takes part in the war for control of Hell on behalf of Neron, duelling Blue Devil. Later, due to the effects of a magical drug Satanus had infested Hell with, he is transformed into a soulless duplicate of Jason Blood. Blood takes steps as to interfere with any possible attempts of Etrigan's to re-merge.

Etrigan briefly appears in the prelude to the JLA/JSA crossover during the Brightest Day event. Etrigan travels to Germany to find a crashed meteorite that contains an unconscious Jade and is drawn into a confrontation with the Justice League after attacking a squad of German superheroes. He mocks the League by claiming they are an inferior team of substitutes, but is ultimately defeated when Donna Troy uses her Lasso of Persuasion to force him back into his Jason Blood form. Blood apologizes for the trouble he caused and departs from the scene, but not before warning Batman and his teammates that the meteorite possesses supernatural qualities. The meteor is later revealed to be the Starheart, a legendary entity that has the power to possess metahumans with magical or elemental abilities.

Etrigan is shown aiding the JLA during their mission into Hell, where he helps Hawkman defeat a demonic beast. He also was the guide to the Secret Six in their trip to Hell and led Catman to see the fate of his father, all the while amused by the confusion and pain they were suffering as a result of their visit.

=== The New 52 ===
In The New 52, the 2011 reboot of the DC Comics universe, Etrigan's past and origins are largely changed. Before the Dark Ages, Etrigan was a Rhyming Demon who served Lucifer before leading a rebellion against him. Jason of Norwich had been sent to Camelot as a scribe to Merlin and was growing frustrated with life, believing he was meant for greater things and suffering from rages. A prophecy showed that if Jason did not have some sort of quest to force him to heal himself, his rage would grow and cause him to kill his lover, Madame Xanadu. During the fall of Camelot, Merlin bonded Etrigan to Jason in an attempt to provide this quest.

Now immortal, Jason and Etrigan came to an agreement and shared their existence. Madame Xanadu began traveling with Jason, only to find Etrigan had now begun falling for her as well and would kill innocents if he thought she and Jason were happy together. To placate the demon, she pretended to be in love with him and cuckolding Jason.

Over the centuries, Jason became known as Jason o' the Blood and Etrigan continued to practice his rhymes. By the Dark Ages, he and Etrigan became the centre of a rag-tag team of adventurers, the "Demon Knights": Jason/Etrigan, Xanadu, Vandal Savage, Shining Knight, the Horsewoman, Saracen inventor Al Jabr (The Numbers in Arabic) and the Amazon Exoristos (The Exile in Greek). They first fought Mordru and the Questing Queen's army to a standstill before being tasked by the city of Alba Sarum to return Merlin to life at Avalon. Etrigan plotted to betray his teammates' souls and Avalon itself to Lucifer to curry his favour. While he successfully manipulated the Knights into letting Hell invade Avalon (and secretly felt guilty about his treatment of Xanadu), he was captured and used by the Questing Queen to gain access as well. Lucifer believed Etrigan had done this deliberately and condemned him; outraged, the demon refused to serve anyone again. At the end of the battle, Jason was tasked as a member of Avalon's Stormwatch, but neither he nor Xanadu wanted to serve Merlin after having Etrigan forced on them again. Jason vowed to not let the demon out so often.

In the present, Etrigan's body lies buried in London; it is explained that he was sealed there by his own friends because of his betrayal of them, but magic emanating from it is able to possess persons above, eventually freeing the demon, who promptly attacks Midnighter and Apollo. The entire Stormwatch battles Etrigan, but after being defeated, he is able to possess a host and flees.

During Trinity War, Etrigan is among the superheroes who feel the disturbance in the magical plane when Shazam picks up Pandora's box. In the timeline of The New 52: Futures End, Zatanna is romantically involved with Etrigan.

Following the storyline "Absolute Power", Etrigan returns to the Justice League as part of the group's expanded lineup. He later appears in the storyline DC K.O., where he is among the participants in the eponymous tournament to combat Darkseid. In a three-match battle against Lex Luthor, Etrigan wins the first fight, but loses the second and third. Luthor magically separates Etrigan and Jason Blood, then kills them both. Etrigan and the tournament's other participants are resurrected by Superman after he wins the tournament and becomes King Omega.

== Characterization ==
=== Transformation incantation ===
To transform into Etrigan, Blood must recite the poem from Merlin's crypt (though usually he only recites the last two lines). The poem does not have to be spoken for it to work. For instance, in one adventure, Blood is magically transformed into a fly by the warlock Shahn-Zi. Unable to speak, Blood triggers the change by writing out the poem in the dust.

Change! Change! O form of man!
Free the prince forever damned!
Free the might from fleshy mire!
Boil the blood in the heart for fire!
Gone! Gone! O form of man
[And] rise the demon Etrigan!!

To return to human form, a couplet must be recited, either by Etrigan or someone else in his hearing, but there are several versions of it:

Begone, begone, O Etrigan
Resume once more the form of man!

Gone now, O Etrigan
And rise again (or rise once more) the form of man!

In other media such as Justice League Dark, a different poem is used to return Etrigan to human form:

Since the battle's fought and won.
Jason Blood with me is done.

== Powers and abilities ==
=== Etrigan ===
Even among demons, Etrigan is considered to be extremely powerful. He has mystically enhanced superhuman strength, to the degree that he can stand against other powerhouses such as Superman, Wonder Woman, and Lobo. He has a high degree of resistance to injury and can project hellfire from his body, usually from his mouth. He has a very high command of magic. Other powers include mystically enhanced fangs and claws, enhanced senses, super speed, agility, telepathy, energy blasts, and precognition. His sadomasochistic nature allows him to enjoy pain as if it were pleasure, making him generally fearless in the face of combat and torture. His healing factor can handle an incredible amount of damage, allowing him to recover from wounds that have removed large sections of his body. He also has pyrokinesis and cryokinesis enabling him to manipulate fire and ice.

=== Jason Blood ===
Jason Blood is a highly skilled hand-to-hand combatant, including mastery in swordsmanship. Jason is adept at magic, and is often called upon to act as an advisor or investigator in occult matters. He has limited precognition and telepathy. Jason is technically immortal due to his connection to the demon Etrigan. He has the combined experiences of Etrigan since he was bonded to the demon. Jason shares all of Etrigan's weaknesses.

=== Weaknesses ===
Etrigan has all the limitations usually associated with a demon, including a weakness towards holy powers, holy water and iron. While his command of magic is strong, it is considered to be less than his father, Belial, and half-brother, Merlin. Additionally, Belial granted the "power of Etrigan" to both Merlin and another son, Lord Scapegoat. He is also helpless against those with magic strong enough to control him, such as Morgaine le Fey. He is also said to have a strong frailty for certain sounds as well.

== Other versions ==
Many alternate universe versions of Etrigan have appeared throughout the character's publication history. Blaze Allen, a composite character based on Etrigan, the Flash, and Ghost Rider, appears in the Amalgam Comics universe. In Batman/Demon: A Tragedy, Etrigan was bonded to Bruce Wayne one thousand years prior and primarily takes over his body at night, targeting and killing criminals due to being influenced by his personality. In the Tangent Comics universe, Etrigan is a human necromancer and member of the Dark Circle. On Earth-17, Etrigan is an alien from the planet Kamelot who was sent to Earth by Merlin shortly before its destruction. In the Flashpoint universe, Etrigan is part of Grifter's resistance movement against the Amazons. In Batman: Damned, Jason Blood is an underground rap artist. In Batman: Curse of the White Knight, Blood is a priest and member of the Order of St. Dumas. In Future State, Blood and Etrigan were separated by Merlin amidst his campaign to eradicate magic, with Blood joining Merlin's cause while Etrigan bonded with Detective Chimp.

== Collected editions ==
Title	Material collected	Year	ISBN
Jack Kirby's The Demon	The Demon #1–16	2008	ISBN 978-1401219161
The Demon: From the Darkness	The Demon vol. 2 #1–4 and vol. 3 #22	2014	ISBN 978-1401242503
The Demon: Hell's Hitman	The Demon vol. 3 #40, 42–49 and Annual #2	2015	ISBN 978-1401258214
The Demon: The Longest Day	The Demon vol. 3 #0, #50–58	2016	ISBN 978-1401260996

== In other media ==
=== Television ===
- Jason Blood and Etrigan appear in Batman: The Brave and the Bold, voiced by Dee Bradley Baker.This version of Etrigan previously served Merlin and worked with him to seal Astaroth in the Underworld.
- Jason Blood and Etrigan appear in Justice League Action, voiced by Patrick Seitz.This version is a member of the Justice League who is able to summon Merlin by speaking his name.
- Jason Blood and Etrigan appear in Young Justice, voiced by David Shaughnessy.This version of the duo are associates of Zatanna, with Blood having been born around the year 500.
- Etrigan appears in the Harley Quinn episode "A Very Problematic Valentine's Day Special", voiced by John Stamos. This version owns a sex shop.
- Etrigan makes a cameo appearance in the Kite Man: Hell Yeah! episode "Mother/Daughter Day, Hell Yeah!", voiced by James Adomian.

==== DC Animated Universe ====
Jason Blood and Etrigan appears in TV series set in the DC Animated Universe (DCAU):

- They first appear in The New Batman Adventures, voiced by Billy Zane.
- Blood and Etrigan appear in the Justice League episode "A Knight of Shadows", voiced by Michael T. Weiss. Here, it is revealed that Merlin bound Blood to Etrigan and gave him immortality as punishment for betraying Camelot to his secret lover Morgaine Le Fey.
- Blood and Etrigan appear in Justice League Unlimited, voiced by Dee Bradley Baker as a child in the episode "Kid's Stuff", Kevin Conroy as an adult in "Kid's Stuff", and again by Michael T. Weiss in the episode "The Balance". As of this series, they have joined the Justice League.

=== Film ===
- Etrigan appears in films set in the DC Animated Movie Universe:
  - The Flashpoint incarnation of Etrigan appears in Justice League: The Flashpoint Paradox, voiced again by Dee Bradley Baker.
  - Jason Blood and Etrigan appears in Justice League Dark, voiced by Ray Chase. In flashbacks to the medieval period, it is revealed that Merlin bound the two to save Blood's life after he was mortally wounded fighting Destiny. In the present, Etrigan and Blood help found the titular Justice League Dark to defeat Destiny, during which he separates them and Blood dies from old wounds.
  - Etrigan appears in Justice League Dark: Apokolips War, voiced again by Ray Chase. Following Blood's death, Etrigan lapsed into severe depression, causing him to no longer speak in rhyme. Out of boredom, he joins Raven, John Constantine, Superman, and other survivors of Darkseid's invasion of Earth to stop him, during which he is killed by a brainwashed Wonder Woman.
- Etrigan appears in DC Showcase: Constantine - The House of Mystery, voiced again by Ray Chase.
- Jason Blood and Etrigan appear in Batman: The Doom That Came to Gotham, voiced by Matthew Waterson.

=== Video games ===
- Etrigan appears as a boss in DC Universe Online's villain campaign, voiced by Christopher S. Field.
- Etrigan and Jason Blood appear as character summons in Scribblenauts Unmasked: A DC Comics Adventure.
- Etrigan appears as a playable character in Lego Batman 3: Beyond Gotham, voiced by Liam O'Brien.
- Etrigan makes a cameo appearance in Raiden's ending in Injustice 2 as a member of the Justice League Dark.
- Etrigan appears as a playable character in Lego DC Super-Villains via the "Justice League Dark" DLC pack.

=== Miscellaneous ===
- In Super Friends #28 (January 1980), Felix Faust enchants a costume party guest dressed as Etrigan, granting him the real demon's powers, to battle Wonder Woman. However, she uses her Lasso of Truth to break the spell.
- Jason Blood and Etrigan appear in The Batman Adventures Annual #2.
- Jason Blood and Etrigan appear in the Batman Beyond tie-in comic book.
- Etrigan appears in The Batman Strikes! #50.
- Etrigan appears in the Injustice: Gods Among Us prequel comic. Following Jason Blood's death, Etrigan makes a deal with Batman to make the latter his new host before attacking High Councilor Superman and putting him into an enchanted coma.

== See also ==
- Jack Kirby bibliography
