= Rama Khan =

Publication information
- Publisher: DC Comics
- First appearance: JLA #62 (March 2002)
- Created by: Joe Kelly; Doug Mahnke

In-story information
- Species: Atlantean
- Team affiliations: League of Ancients
- Abilities: Magic manipulation Can turn Jarhanpur soil into fire, earth, or wine

Rama Khan is a fictional character appearing in American comic books published by DC Comics. He first appeared in JLA #62 and was created by Joe Kelly and Doug Mahnke.

Khan is an ancient magician from the fictional country of Jarhanpur, which is described as "living land" and possesses a form of life. Khan later left Jarhanpur, becoming the co-ruler of Atlantis alongside Gamemnae.

== Fictional character biography ==
Rama Khan was originally from the country Jarhanpur before he journeyed to Atlantis from the faraway land of Jarhanpur and became its ruler alongside Gamemnae. However, Manitou Raven learned that Gamemnae had manipulated the League of Ancients to stop the Justice League ruining her own vision of the future, Gamemnae killing the rest of the League of Ancients after the Justice League's apparent death and absorbing Khan and others into herself.

In the 21st century, Rama Khan reappears in Jarhanpur as its elemental defender. When he kidnaps a boy and separates him from his mother because the child is his spiritual successor, Khan finds himself in conflict with the Justice League. He breaks Wonder Woman's Lasso of Truth, resulting in reality rewriting itself as it is defined by belief rather than truth. Although Jarhanpur's nature as living land protects it, the League resolve to stop the chaos before the world becomes defined by the beliefs of every individual person on the planet. They confront Khan once again, during which Wonder Woman accepts why the Lasso had broken: when she confirmed that Khan was telling the truth about the need for a successor to his position, her denial of this truth caused the lasso to break. With this self-discovery, Diana repairs the Lasso, restoring reality. Jarhanpur rejects Khan, who has become focused more on preserving his position than respecting the wishes of the land.

== Powers and abilities ==
Rama Khan's abilities are largely based on his birthplace, Jarhanpur. With the aid of magic, Khan can turn a handful of its soil into fire, granite, or wine. Khan is also super strong, immortal, and a skilled magician.

== In other media ==
Rama Khan appears in the fifth season of Supergirl, portrayed by Mitch Pileggi. This version is a high-ranking operative of Leviathan from Krypton's sister planet Jarhanpur. He first arrived on Earth during the Mesozoic and caused a number of cataclysmic events, such as the biblical flood, the eruption of Mount Vesuvius, the 526 Antioch earthquake, the Yellow River Flood, and the 1970 Bhola cyclone.
