= Justice League Elite =

Comic book

- The cover to Justice League Elite #1, art by Doug Mahnke and Tom Nguyen.

Publication information
- Publisher: DC Comics
- Schedule: Monthly
- Format: Limited series
- Genre: Superhero
- Publication date: September 2004 – August 2005
- No. of issues: 12
- Main character(s): Sister Superior; Coldcast; Menagerie; Manitou Raven; Green Arrow; Flash; Major Disaster; Kasumi; Naif al-Sheikh

Creative team
- Written by: Joe Kelly
- Artist: Doug Mahnke

Collected editions
- Volume 1: ISBN 1-4012-0481-3
- Volume 2: ISBN 1-4012-1556-4

Justice League Elite is a twelve-issue comic book limited series published monthly by DC Comics in 2004 and 2005. The title was created by writer Joe Kelly and penciller Doug Mahnke. The limited series is a spin-off from the JLA title.

The Justice League Elite was formed to attempt black ops that would not be acceptable for the JLA to "sully their hands" with.

"The Justice League Elite are a not-exactly-sanctioned, don't-ask-don't-tell, covert operations unit-- newly formed to hunt and eliminate extra-normal threats to the earth before they go public". (JLA Secret Files and Origins 2004)

The team was formed at the end JLA #100 from most of the second incarnation of The Elite (only missing Hat), members of the JLA and a couple of spies/assassins. They operated out of Somerset, New Jersey.

== Membership ==
- Sister Superior, sister of the Elite's first leader Manchester Black, sees the Elite as a means of atoning for her brother's actions.
- Coldcast, the only original member of the Elite in the JLE, and inspired by Superman to fight for right after his earlier actions in the Elite.
- Menagerie, joined with an alien weapon crèche (formerly bonded to her comatose sister) which drove her insane, now in a metahuman prison facility.
- Manitou Raven and his wife Dawn (who later becomes Manitou Dawn after her husband's death), serving as the team's magical expert.
- Green Arrow (Oliver Queen), serving as the team's tactical expert and left-winger, commonly coordinating their battles from the base; has a brief affair with Dawn.
- Flash (Wally West), working in the Elite after recent events caused him to question the League's policy of only reacting to threats; he was a member of both teams simultaneously, but used a new, dark costume for his time with the Elite.
- Major Disaster, a former supervillain who reformed and went on to join the Justice League.
- Kasumi, supposedly an assassin who killed two hundred men before she was sixteen, but actually an undercover Batgirl (Cassandra Cain), sent by Batman to monitor the Elite.
- Naif al-Sheikh, an Arab expert in international espionage who was brought in by Vera Black because she believed his dislike of metahumans would keep the team in check.

== Collected editions ==
The group's appearances have been collected in two trade paperbacks:

- Justice League Elite:
  - Volume 1 (collects: Action Comics #775, JLA #100, JLA Secret Files 2004, and Justice League Elite #1–4, 208 pages, 2005, Titan ISBN 1-84576-191-X, DC ISBN 1-4012-0481-3)
  - Volume 2 (collects Justice League Elite #5–12, 192 pages, 2007, Titan ISBN 1-84576-632-6, DC ISBN 1-4012-1556-4)
