= Aquarian Age (disambiguation) =

Aquarian Age is a Japanese collectible trading card game.

Aquarian Age may also refer to:

- Age of Aquarius, an astrological term denoting either the current or forthcoming astrological age
- Aquarian Age: Sign for Evolution a television anime series based on the card game

== See also ==
- Aquarian (disambiguation)
