= List of DC Comics characters: B =

== Baby Boom ==
Baby Boom was among the children who were experimented on by Doctor Love while they were still in their mother's womb, causing her to develop the ability to generate accelerate matter and generate explosions with her mind while stunting her growth and leaving her physically stuck at the age of five. Love raised the six children in isolation until they learned of their origins, upon which they killed Love and struck out on their own as the group Helix.

== Bad Samaritan ==
The Bad Samaritan (alias Zviad Baazovi) is an enemy of the Outsiders who first appeared in The Outsiders #3 (January 1986). He is a former Soviet spymaster and eventually becomes the second White Queen's Bishop of Checkmate. After the fall of the Soviet Union, Baazovi is loyal to his native country of Georgia and shows a great deal of distrust for Russia. While working with a Russian White Queen and White Queen's Knight, Baazovi has shown to be cooperative despite their different political ideologies.

=== Bad Samaritan in other media ===
- The Bad Samaritan appears as a character summon in Scribblenauts Unmasked: A DC Comics Adventure.
- Zviad Baazovi appears in Young Justice, voiced by Yuri Lowenthal. This version is a psychic metahuman, a member of the Light, and Markovia's ambassador at the United Nations.

== Balloon Man ==
Balloon Man is a size-shifting supervillain of indeterminate origin who fought the Metal Men.

=== Balloon Man in other media ===
- An unrelated version of Balloon Man appears in the Gotham episode "The Balloonman", portrayed by Dan Bakkedahl. This version is a social worker named Davis Lamond who secretly uses weather balloons to target corrupt people.
- Balloon Man appears in Teen Titans Go! To the Movies, voiced by Greg Davies.

== Barrage ==
Barrage (Phillip Karnowski) is a criminal who originally fought Maggie Sawyer and lost his right arm in the process. While incarcerated at Stryker's Island, he builds high-tech armor and a prosthetic arm. Using his technology, Karnowski attacks the Metropolis Police Department's Special Victims Unit to get revenge on Sawyer before being defeated by Superman.

Barrage later escapes and joins Morgan Edge's Superman Revenge Squad.

=== Barrage in other media ===
- Phillip Karnowski appears in the Supergirl episode "The Darkest Place", portrayed by Victor Zinck Jr. This version is a former Navy SEAL who became a vigilante after his wife Julie was murdered. He frames Guardian for the attacks, but is defeated by him and arrested by the National City Police Department.
- Phillip Karnowski appears in the Superman & Lois episode "The Ties That Bind", portrayed by Shaw Madsen. This version is an arms and drug dealer.

== Javier Basualdo ==
Javier Basualdo was created by Josh Trujillo and Adrián Gutiérrez, and first appeared in Blue Beetle vol. 10 #1 (November 2023). He is possessed by Kha-Ef-Re as Blood Scarab in order to antagonize Ted Kord and Jaime Reyes until his control is restored by Madame Xanadu and Traci Thirteen as atonement.

== Batman Jones ==
Batman Jones is a fictional character appearing in American comic books published by DC Comics. The character, created by Jack Schiff and Bill Finger, first appeared in Batman #108 (June 1957).

Jones' parents were rescued by Batman shortly before Jones was born and they named him "Batman" as thanks. The boy grew up idolizing Batman and tried to become a crimefighter before he began collecting stamps. As an adult, he is an expert on Batman.

A rebooted version of the character appeared in the storyline Battle for the Cowl, where he was interviewed by Vicki Vale.

== Beard Hunter ==
Beard Hunter (Ernest Franklin) is a disturbed and closeted gay assassin of bearded men who is hired by the Bearded Gentlemen's Club of Metropolis to kill the Chief because he will not sell his beard to them. He cannot grow a beard due to a male hormone deficiency, as stated by his mother when she is visited by the police.

=== Beard Hunter in other media ===
- Beard Hunter appears in Doom Patrol, portrayed by Tommy Snider. This version is a bounty hunter with the ability to track down individuals by consuming their facial hair.
- Beard Hunter appears in a self-titled episode of Teen Titans Go!, voiced by Fred Tatasciore. This version is Australian.

== Beast Girl ==
Beast Girl is the name of two characters in DC Comics.

=== Beast Girl ===
Beast Girl is a member of the Doomed, an Indian superhero team. She was established to exist during the Doomsday Clock storyline, but was not seen in person.

=== Kareli ===
Kareli first appeared in Unstoppable Doom Patrol #1 (May 2023), and was created by writer Dennis Culver and artist Chris Burnham.

Kareli is a girl whose metagene was activated after she was attacked by coyotes during a hike, giving her an animalistic, purple-furred appearance and the ability to manipulate the minds of others by affecting their amygdala. Kareli was rejected by her father, who saw her as a monster, and chased by a group of civilians who she accidentally enraged with her powers. After being rescued by the Doom Patrol, Kareli was taken in and mentored by Niles Caulder and Flex Mentallo, who taught her to control and utilize her powers. Eventually, she was inducted into the Doom Patrol by the Chief, who was impressed with her performance.

In the storyline Absolute Power, Beast Girl is attacked by the Amazo android Depth Charge, losing her powers while retaining her altered appearance. After the Amazos are destroyed, Beast Girl regains her original powers while gaining the ability to transform into animals. The series Titans reveals that Beast Girl's new powers originate from Zookeeper and were inadvertently transferred to her after the Amazos were destroyed. Beast Boy, a fellow member of the Doom Patrol, befriends Beast Girl, offering to train her in the use of her powers.

=== Powers and abilities of Beast Girl ===
Beast Girl is a metahuman with the ability to manipulate the amygdala, a part of the brain that controls emotion. She is able to activate "primal instincts" in others, which allows her to induce extreme anger, fear, or calm. Additionally, Beast Girl possesses an animal-like appearance with purple fur, horns, claws, and fangs, as well as increased agility. Following the events of "Absolute Power", Beast Girl inadvertently received Zookeeper's powers while retaining her original abilities. She is able to transform into any animal, normal or extraterrestrial, while retaining her purple coloration.

== Behemoth ==
Behemoth (Taro Raiden) was a champion sumo wrestler who naturally possessed enhanced speed. When he willingly joined up with Mento and became a member of the Hybrid, he gained superhuman strength from Mento's experimentation.

In the DC Rebirth relaunch, Behemoth appears as part of Task Force Y, a group working under Amanda Waller.

== Billy Numerous ==
Billy Numerous is a character created for the Teen Titans animated series, voiced by Jason Marsden. Numerous first appears as a student of the H.I.V.E. Academy who possesses the ability to clone himself. After H.I.V.E. is destroyed during Cyborg's confrontation with Brother Blood, Numerous and most of the other students become freelance villains.

At some point, Numerous joins Jinx's H.I.V.E. Five and the Brotherhood of Evil. When the Brotherhood executes a worldwide strike against the Titans and their allies, Numerous and Gizmo are sent to capture Kole and Gnarrk, but are unsuccessful. Beast Boy and the remaining members of the Titans attack the Brotherhood's headquarters, with Numerous being subdued by Kid Flash.

Billy Numerous is introduced into the main comics continuity in the third volume of Cyborg (2023).

=== Billy Numerous in other media ===
- Billy Numerous appears in the Teen Titans Go! tie-in comic.
- Billy Numerous appears in Teen Titans Go!, voiced by Scott Menville.

== Bird ==
Bird is a character appearing in American comic books published by DC Comics. He debuted in Batman: Vengeance of Bane #1 and was created by Chuck Dixon, Doug Moench, and Graham Nolan.

Birdy Colossimo is a Santa Prisca inmate who became Bane's second-in-command and closest confidant among his lieutenants Zombie and Trogg. He owns a pet falcon named Talon. They all escaped one day and went to Gotham City to begin Bane's master plan at the start of the "Batman: Knightfall" storyline.

Bird is later transferred to a Florida prison. Sometime later, Bane frees Bird from prison and develops a new version of the Venom drug. When Azrael attacks, Bane injects Bird with the sample of Venom. Bird was defeated and the Venom drug wore off.

=== Bird in other media ===
- A character based on Birdy Colossimo named Angel "Bird" Vallelunga appears in the fifth season of Gotham, portrayed by David Carranza.
- Bird appears in the Kite Man: Hell Yeah! episode "Prison Break, Hell Yeah!".
- A character based on Birdy Colossimo named Angel "Bird" Vallelunga appears in Batman: Arkham Origins, voiced by Christian Lanz.

== Bison-Black-as-Midnight-Sky ==
Bison-Black-as-Midnight-Sky is a Native American shaman in the DC Universe.

The character, created by Gerry Conway and Pat Broderick, first appeared in The Fury of Firestorm #1 (June 1982).

Bison-Black-as-Midnight-Sky is the great-grandfather of Black Bison and the last great shaman of the Bison Cult. He resents his great-grandson's disrespect for the cult's traditions. When he is killed by muggers in Central Park, he binds his spirit to a magical amulet that allows his spirit to influence his great-grandson when worn. (Note: Gerry Conway (w), Pat Broderick (p). "Day of the Bison" The Fury of Firestorm, no. 1 (June 1982). DC Comics.)

== Black Arrow ==
Black Arrow is a character appearing in American comic books published by DC Comics. The character was created by Otto Binder and George Papp, first appearing in Adventure Comics #143 (August 1949). He is a leader of a criminal gang, who creates the identity as part of a robbery scheme to outwit the Green Arrow.

=== Black Arrow in other media ===
An original incarnation of Black Arrow appears in Freedom Fighters: The Ray, voiced by Matthew Mercer. This version is a member of the New Reichsmen from Earth-X.

== Black Beetle ==
Black Beetle is a character appearing in the DC Universe, commonly as an enemy of Blue Beetle and Booster Gold.

Black Beetle was created by Geoff Johns, Jeff Katz and Dan Jurgens, and first appeared in Booster Gold vol. 2 #5 (February 2008).

Originally posing as a version of Blue Beetle from the future, he offers Booster Gold a chance to go back in time to alter despite Rip Hunter's claims, recruiting Dan Garrett and Jaime Reyes for saving Ted Kord from death by Maxwell Lord. After their return to the present, however, they learn that the timeline has been altered where Lord has taken over the world with an OMAC army. Booster and Kord attempt to fix the timeline, but are attacked by Black Beetle, who reveals his affiliation with the Time Stealers. Kord willingly returns to the past to be killed to restore the timeline.

DC Rebirth revealed Black Beetle to be the Earth 3 counterpart of Michael Carter.

=== Black Beetle in other media ===
- Black Beetle appears in Young Justice, voiced by Kevin Grevioux. This version is an enforcer of the Reach.
- Black Beetle, based on the Young Justice incarnation, appears as a playable character in Lego DC Super-Villains via the Young Justice DLC.

== Black Bison ==
- Further reading: Black Bison at the Comic Book DB (archived from the original); Black Bison at the Grand Comics Database

Black Bison is the name of two supervillains in the DC Universe.

The character, created by Gerry Conway and Pat Broderick, first appeared in The Fury of Firestorm #1 (June 1982).

=== John Ravenhair ===
Black-Cloud-In-Morning is a Native American who was raised in the modern world and legally renamed himself John Ravenhair. After being possessed by his ancestor, Bison-Black-as-Midnight-Sky, Ravenhair sets about avenging the wrongs committed against the Native American people. When removed from Bison's spirit, he occasionally acts for good, but is frequently a threat to Firestorm.

During the Day of Vengeance event, Black Bison is killed by the Spectre during his crusade against magic. Black Bison was resurrected following The New 52 continuity reboot.

=== Powers and abilities of Black Bison ===
Black Bison is armed with a coup-stick that allows him to bring inanimate objects to life and manipulate weather. He is also trained in martial arts.

=== Black Bison in other media ===
- An unidentified incarnation of Black Bison appears in the Injustice: Gods Among Us prequel comic.
- The John Ravenhair incarnation of Black Bison appears as a character summon in Scribblenauts Unmasked: A DC Comics Adventure.
- A female incarnation of Black Bison named Mina Chaytan appears in The Flash, portrayed by Chelsea Kurtz. This version acquired the ability to bring effigies to life after the Thinker tricked the Flash into exposing her to dark matter. The Thinker later kills Chaytan, among other metahumans, to steal their powers.
- Black Bison makes a cameo appearance in Superman via a mural at the Hall of Justice.

== Black Spider ==
Black Spider is the name of several characters appearing in American comic books published by DC Comics. The primary version, Eric Needham, was created by Gerry Conway and Ernie Chua and first appeared in Detective Comics #463 (September 1976). Needham is an enemy of Batman as well as a member of the Suicide Squad following The New 52.

Eric Needham is a small-time crook and drug addict who accidentally killed his father. Overcoming his addiction in grief and for the sake of his family, he gains an intense hatred of drug dealers and criminals before receiving training and a costume from a mysterious benefactor. As the lethal assassin and vigilante Black Spider, he clashes with Batman and becomes one of his adversaries due to their differences in ideology, particularly in using lethal force against criminals. Needham is an early member of the Suicide Squad, being one of the few handpicked by Amanda Waller as a willing operative.

=== Black Spider in other media ===
- Black Spider appears in Young Justice, voiced by Josh Keaton. This version is a member of the League of Shadows who wields wrist-mounted web-shooters.
- Black Spider appears in Batman: Assault on Arkham, voiced by Giancarlo Esposito. This version is a vigilante responsible for killing several gangsters across the United States. He is recruited into Amanda Waller's Suicide Squad to retrieve sensitive information from the Riddler and implanted with a nano-bomb in his neck to keep him in line. However, the squad encounters Batman, who secretly knocks out Black Spider and disguises himself as him to investigate the squad. After the squad discovers the Riddler knows how to deactivate their bombs, they allow him to do so. Waller learns of their treachery and attempts to detonate their bombs before then, but succeeds in killing Black Spider and King Shark while the rest of the squad survive and discover Batman's ruse.
- Black Spider, based on his New 52 appearance, appears as a character summon in Scribblenauts Unmasked: A DC Comics Adventure.

== Vera Black ==
- Further reading: Vera Black at the Comic Book DB (archived from the original)

Vera Black, also known as Sister Superior, is a British psionic cyborg in the DC Universe.

The character, created by Joe Kelly and Doug Mahnke, first appeared in JLA #100 (August 2004). The storyline set up the limited series Justice League Elite which consisted of 12 issues published between 2004 and 2005.

Vera Black is the sister of Manchester Black. As children, their parents would often fight and Manchester would take her out to play to avoid them. As his idea of "play" became killing sprees, Vera's perspective became twisted. When her brother dies after attempting to destroy Superman, she has her damaged arms replaced with malleable cybernetic prostheses, initially contemplating revenge on Superman before she decides to be better than her brother.

Her new abilities result in her leading the remnants of the Elite and tacitly working with the Justice League. This leads to the League, encouraged by the Flash, asking her to lead a new team with the intention that she will handle black ops missions that the League cannot due to what they represent to the public, primarily involving hunting down and eliminating metahuman threats before they go public. Starting with Coldcast and Menagerie, she adds Flash, Manitou Raven, Major Disaster, Green Arrow, and Kasumi to the team. She also enlists Naif al-Sheikh to keep the team in check and serve as a liaison to the governments of the world.

=== Powers and abilities of Vera Black ===
Vera's cybernetic arms can transform into various melee, projectile and beam weapons. They also incorporate camouflage technology relying on optics, as well as altering sense perception in others.

=== Vera Black in other media ===
- Vera Black appears in Superman vs. The Elite, voiced by Marcella Lentz-Pope as an adult and Tara Strong as a child.
- Vera Black as Sister Superior appears as a character summon in Scribblenauts Unmasked: A DC Comics Adventure.

== Blackbriar Thorn ==
Blackbriar Thorn is an ancient druid and the last survivor of his sect who can manipulate and transform into plants. When his entire sect is massacred by attacking Roman forces, Thorn flees to the surrounding forest. Attempting to escape capture, he transforms himself into solid wood, but is buried underground. Millennia later, Blackbriar Thorn's body is unearthed by an archaeologist and subsequently displayed at the Gotham City Museum of History. When moonlight strikes the statue on the night of its unveiling, Thorn is revived and begins to wreak havoc on the Museum and its patrons. Superman and Etrigan drive Thorn to retreat into the city, where he later attempts to procure a new body—-that of Superman. Together, Etrigan and Superman defeat Thorn, rendering him incorporeal.

Blackbriar Thorn appears in human form during Crisis on Infinite Earths. He, Etrigan, and other assembled mystics lend their combined energies-—channeled through Doctor Occult and Alan Scott—-to fend off the Anti-Monitor's Shadow Demons.

As part of Johnny Sorrow's version of the Injustice Society, Thorn and his teammates are defeated by Wildcat as they invade the JSA's headquarters. Thorn's defeat leaves his body splintered into pieces, one shard of which is kept on display in JSA Headquarters. Thorn lies dormant until the Injustice Society's next attack.

=== Powers and abilities of Blackbriar Thorn ===
Blackbriar Thorn has exhibited a plethora of abilities, including manipulation of the weather, extensive control over vegetation—either living or dead, the ability to regenerate from even a sliver of his physical form, and the creation of illusions. Thorn can draw strength and abilities though physical contact with the Earth.

=== Blackbriar Thorn in other media ===
- Blackbriar Thorn appears in the Young Justice episode "Misplaced", voiced by Kevin Michael Richardson.
- Blackbriar Thorn appears as a character summon in Scribblenauts Unmasked: A DC Comics Adventure.

== Blackguard ==
Blackguard (Richard Hertz) is a man who works for the 1,000, serving as their enforcer under the codename Blackguard. When the 1,000 tried to kill Blackguard in their mission to kill Booster Gold, Blackguard was saved by Booster Gold.

In Underworld Unleashed, Blackguard gives his soul to Neron in exchange for superhuman strength, enhanced intellect, and special equipment. He joins Cheetah and Earthworm in attacking the Warriors bar.

In both the original and DC Rebirth continuities, Blackguard is killed while serving in the Suicide Squad.

=== Blackguard in other media ===
Blackguard appears in The Suicide Squad, portrayed by Pete Davidson. This version is recruited into the eponymous team for a mission in Corto Maltese, but betrays the group by warning the military of their arrival. He tries to surrender upon making landfall, but he is shot and killed.

== Blackout ==
- Further reading: Blackout at the Grand Comics Database

Blackout (Farooq) is a metahuman who can harness electricity. He makes his first appearance in Flashpoint (vol. 2) #1 (July 2011). In the alternate timeline created by the events of Flashpoint, Blackout is recruited by Cyborg to help end the Amazon-Atlantean war, which has devastated Europe and killed millions of people.

Another new recruit, the Outsider, revealed during a meeting with Batman that he had been hunting Blackout so he could use his abilities to power India. This manhunt resulted in the loss of Blackout's girlfriend and his departure from school. Blackout has since voiced his reluctance to be part of the same team with his worst enemy.

=== Blackout in other media ===
Farooq Gibran / Blackout appears in The Flash episode "Power Outage", portrayed by Michael Reventar. This version acquired his abilities after being electrocuted amidst the explosion of S.T.A.R. Labs' particle accelerator and sought revenge against the head of S.T.A.R. Labs, Harrison Wells. In pursuit of this goal, Farooq is confronted by the Flash, who eventually overcharges and kills him.

== Blackrock ==
Blackrock is a supervillain appearing in American comic books published by DC Comics. Blackrock is a recurring enemy of Superman first appearing in Action Comics #458 (April 1976).

Peter Silverstone is a doctor who creates Blackrock to increase ratings for the United Broadcasting television network. He eventually becomes Blackrock himself, using a powerful stone that can metabolize electromagnetic energy into energy to achieve flight, energy blasts and superhuman strength, and fought Superman several times. In post-Crisis continuity, the Blackrock is a symbiotic alien.

Overuse of the Blackrock's powers blinds Silverstone and leaves him insane. He is killed by ex-convict Samuel Benjamin, who takes the Blackrock for himself. Despite its power, his inexperience with the Blackrock leads to his defeat. Superman takes the stone and throws it into the Sun.

After Silverstone is defeated, Alexander Luthor Jr. retrieves the Blackrock and gives it to South American drug smuggler and revolutionary Lucia.

Batman later obtains the Blackrock and uses it to stop Despero. Superman forces Blackrock to leave Superman by threatening to kill it.

In The New 52 continuity reboot, Blackrock is Bradley Glenn, an ex-con who is hired to star in the reality television series Badass Nation.

=== Blackrock in other media ===
The Lucia incarnation of Blackrock appears as a character summon in Scribblenauts Unmasked: A DC Comics Adventure.

== Blackwing ==
Blackwing (Charles "Charlie" Bullock) is a superhero appearing in American comic books published by DC Comics. He was created by Paul Levitz, Joe Staton, and Joey Cavalieri.

The character was chronologically introduced in Adventure Comics #464 (April 1979), but was unnamed in that comic. He was, however, named in his next appearance in Wonder Woman #281 (April 1981) and later, became Blackwing in Wonder Woman #297 (August 1982). Also, worth to note, the original story in Adventure Comics was intended for All Star Comics #75. Charlie was drawn as a teen in that story, but his next appearance (only three years later) depicts him as a young adult who graduated from law school.

In his mid-teens, Charles Bullock was searching for a direction in life. The teenager found it after he helped fight off street punks alongside Wildcat and was invited to join him at his gym. Charlie attended law school and later became a junior partner and top-notch researcher to the law firm called Cranston, Grayson and Wayne. When a criminal named Karnage broke into the office looking for his boss Arthur Cranston, this, and another event, led him to become the costumed hero Blackwing. Although his first outing as a crime fighter proved unsuccessful when he was captured by the costumed villain Boa's gang, Blackwing managed to contribute in freeing the Huntress from Boa's giant snake and recorded some evidence that was used to put the mastermind and his men away.

Since then, Blackwing has never appeared again in any other published story.

== Blaze and Satanus ==
Blaze and Satanus are a pair of demonic supervillains demonic siblings appearing in American comic books published by DC Comics. Blaze debuted in Action Comics #655 (July 1990), and was created by Roger Stern, Brett Breeding, and Bob McLeod. Satanus was created by Brett Breeding, Jerry Ordway, and Tom Grummett, and debuted in The Adventures of Superman #493 (August 1992). Blaze and Satanus were originally depicted as enemies of Superman; they were later revealed to be the children of the Wizard Shazam and an unidentified hellhound, becoming associated with Captain Marvel.

== Blitzkrieg ==
Blitzkrieg is a character appearing in American comic books related to DC Comics. The character was created by Geoff Johns and Dale Eaglesham and first appeared in Justice Society of America (vol. 3) #2 (March 2007) as Baroness Blitzkrieg. An apparent descendant of Baron Blitzkrieg, she is a speedster, member of the Fourth Reich, and enemy of the Justice Society of America.

Additionally, two alternative equivalents of the character appear as inhabitants of Earth-10:

- The first, a male speedster identified as the Flash appears in the stories 52, Countdown and Countdown to Final Crisis as a member of the JSAxis before he is recruited by the Monarch.
- The second, a female speedster identified as Blitzen appears in The Multiversity as a member of the New Reichsmen.

=== Blitzkrieg in other media ===
Two characters inspired by Blitzkrieg appear in media set in the Arrowverse:

- Blitzkrieg appears in Freedom Fighters: The Ray, voiced by Scott Whyte. This version is a male speedster from Earth-X and a member of the New Reichsmen.
- Eobard Thawne appears as a similar character, the Dark Flash, in the crossover "Crisis on Earth-X" as a general of the New Reichsmen within Earth-X.

== Block ==
Block is a young Maori woman living in Melbourne, Australia, who was once inexplicably struck by lightning and survived the incident. Unknown to her, this similar event had happened to many other individuals throughout time and was caused by the Speed Force. In her then-present time—1957—Block works as a side show attraction in a carnival, the prize of $1,000 going to whoever could move her, which proves difficult due to her ability to manipulate her body density. One drunken man staggered onto the stage to accept her challenge, making her move by insulting her Maori heritage rather than physically moving her. Angered, Block strikes out and instigated a small brawl. Zoom rescues Block and recruits her into his forces. Unknown to Block, Zoom is actually the one to have orchestrated her joining him to begin with, appearing to the drunk man who challenged her, while convincing him that the way to make her move was to attack her heritage, as he had been keeping close watch on her for some time.

=== Powers and abilities ===
Being imbued with the Speed Force, Block has the unique ability to slow down her atoms. In doing this, they become denser than steel and grant her invulnerability, superhuman strength and immobility. She can possibly slow down other speedsters, if not other people as well, through physical touch, as she stopped the Top's ability to spin and was able to hold Zoom in place in a headlock. After training centuries with Zoom, she is a deadly fighter.

=== Block in other media ===
Vanessa Jansen / Block appears in The Flash episode "Blocked", portrayed by Erin Cummings. This version was a weapons dealer who worked for the East Street Skulls gang until she was betrayed and sent to Iron Heights Penitentiary for four years. After becoming a metahuman with the ability to create boxes of dense air and getting out of Iron Heights, both by unknown means, she seeks revenge on her former gang until she is stopped by the Flash and XS. Before the heroes can re-incarcerate Jansen, she is attacked and mortally wounded by Cicada. XS rushes her to the hospital, but Jansen dies of her injuries off-screen.

== Blok ==
Blok is a superhero appearing in American comic books published by DC Comics. He has a massive, stony body, as well as incredible strength and endurance. He is introduced as a member of the League of Super-Assassins, where he is manipulated by the Dark Man, a clone of Tharok, into attacking the Legion of Super-Heroes and believing that they are attempting to destroy his home planet of Dryad. After learning the truth, Blok turns on the Assassins and eventually joins the Legion.

Blok is relatively slow to acclimate to life in the Legion, though he forms a close bond with teammates Timber Wolf and White Witch. He remains with the team for several years before leaving after the catastrophic Black Dawn affair. He eventually moves to the Puppet Planetoid, where he spends several years in isolated contemplation. Blok is later tracked down and killed by Roxxas on the Dominators' orders.

Blok returns to continuity in Superman and the Legion of Super-Heroes and Final Crisis: Legion of 3 Worlds, with the latter series revealing him to be in a relationship with the White Witch. After the White Witch absorbs Mordru's magic and becomes the Black Witch, Blok convinces her to remain on the side of good.

=== Blok in other media ===
- Blok makes a non-speaking appearance in the Justice League Unlimited episode "Far From Home".
- Blok makes non-speaking appearances in Legion of Super Heroes.

=== Reception ===
Jesse Murray of Syfy placed Blok as the 33rd greatest Legion member of all time, describing him as "once a misguided bad guy who saw the light". Warner Bros. producer James Tucker cited the character as a favorite of his.

== Bloodwork ==
Bloodwork (Ramsey Rosso) is a character appearing in American comic books published by DC Comics. The character, created by Joshua Williamson, Paul Pelletier, and Howard Porter, first appeared in The Flash (vol. 5) #28 (October 2017). An enemy of Barry Allen / Flash, he possesses the metahuman ability to manipulate blood, which he gave himself in an attempt to cure his hemophilia.

=== Bloodwork in other media ===
Bloodwork appears in The Flash, portrayed by Sendhil Ramamurthy. This version is former colleague of Caitlin Snow / Killer Frost.

== Blue Bowman ==
Blue Bowman is an alias utilized by characters in the DC Universe.

=== Phil Cobb ===
Phillip "Phil" Cobb, commonly known as Signalman, temporarily took on the Blue Bowman identity as a copycat of Green Arrow while opposing Batman.

=== Humanoid version ===
A humanoid archer simply called Bowman is a member of the Champions of Angor (also known as the Assemblers or Justifiers), first appearing in Justice League Europe #16 (July 1990), is a pastiche of Marvel Comics' Hawkeye. Additionally, an Earth-8 version is part of the Meta-Militia as Secretary of Security for Tin Man and Americommando.

=== Earth 3 version ===
An Earth 3 counterpart of Oliver Queen, commonly known as Deadeye, is a member of the Crime Society.

==== Blue Bowman in other media ====
Blue Bowman appears in the Batman: The Brave and the Bold episode "Deep Cover for Batman!", voiced by James Arnold Taylor.

== Mackenzie Bock ==
Mackenzie "Hardback" Bock is a character appearing in American comic books published by DC Comics. Mackenzie Bock was a detective in the Gotham City Police Department.

=== Mackenzie Bock in other media ===
Mackenzie Bock appears in media set in The Batman franchise, portrayed by Con O'Neill. This version is the Gotham City Police Department's chief of police. He first appears in the film The Batman (2022) and makes subsequent appearances in the spin-off miniseries The Penguin (2024).

== Bolphunga ==
- Further reading: Bolphunga at the Comic Book DB (archived from the original); Bolphunga at the Grand Comics Database

Bolphunga the Unrelenting is an extraterrestrial bounty hunter in the DC Universe.

The character, created by Alan Moore and Dave Gibbons, first appeared in Green Lantern (vol. 2) #188 (May 1985).

Bolphunga has a love of destruction and plots to make a name for himself by challenging the most feared and mysterious beings in creation, fixating on Green Lanterns. This has led to his defeat by Mogo, (Note: Green Lantern (vol. 2) #188 (May 1985)) Kilowog, (Note: Green Lantern Corps: Recharge #4 (February 2006)) and Guy Gardner. (Note: Green Lantern Corps (vol. 2) #5 (December 2006))

=== Bolphunga in other media ===
Bolphunga appears in Green Lantern: Emerald Knights, voiced by Roddy Piper.

== Bolt ==
Bolt is the name of several characters appearing in American comic books published by DC Comics, appearing as both villains and superheroes.

=== Larry Boltainsky ===
- First appearance: Blue Devil #6 (November 1984)
- Species: Human
- Abilities: High-tech suit grants: Energy blasts; Fight; Teleporation

The original version of Bolt, Larry Boltainsky first appeared in Blue Devil #6 (November 1984) and was created by Gary Cohn, Dan Mishkin, Paris Cullins, and Ernie Colón. A special effects artist and assassin, he designed a special suit that gives him the power to teleport and project energy blasts.

Bolt appears in Suicide Squad #63–66 (1992) as part of a more villainous version of the Squad supporting a dictatorship in the island of Diabloverde. Amanda Waller and the Squad take out him and his colleagues while attempting to remove the dictator. He joins a sub-group of assassins that call themselves the Killer Elite. One of their many battles puts them up against the Body Doubles. Bolt is hospitalized in an off-panel battle. He joins the third incarnation of the Suicide Squad and is killed by mutant ants on his first mission.

Bolt later turns up alive again in the pages of Identity Crisis #1 and is badly injured by two street kids, suffering a punctured lung and two punctured kidneys. He has since joined the Society.

Bolt is a member of Lex Luthor, Joker and Cheetah's Injustice League Unlimited and is one of the villains featured in Salvation Run. He is one of the villains sent to retrieve the Get Out of Hell free card from the Secret Six. Bolt is killed by his son Dreadbolt, who uses his own suit's teleporting ability to send him into a brick wall.

Bolt returns following the "Infinite Frontier" relaunch, where he appears as a member of the Suicide Squad. He is killed by an unstable Talon of the Court of Owls the team was meant to rescue.

=== Alinta ===
Bolt (Alinta) was created by Tim Sheridan and Rafa Sandoval. Alinta is an Australian metahuman speedster similar to the Flash who lost her legs to pay off her parents' debts. With specialized prosthetic running blades and a connection to the Speed Force, Alinta becomes a student at the Teen Titans Academy. Alinta was introduced in the Future State event and incorporated into the main continuity shortly afterward in Infinite Frontier.

=== Malik White ===
- First appearance: Black Adam #1 (August, 2022)
- Created by: Christopher Priest and Rafa Sandoval
- Abilities: Divine empowerment by Black Adam grants: Immortality; Superhuman attributes: speed, strength, durability, and stamina; Self-healing and healing of others; Magical affinity; Knowledge of medicine
- Aliases: White Adam, Malik-Adam

Bolt (Malik Adam White) was created by Christopher Priest and artist Rafa Sandoval. He is an African-American of Egyptian/Kahndaqi descent and the descendant of Black Adam. Malik was initially codenamed White Adam before settling on Bolt.

In the eponymous Black Adam series, Malik is introduced as a medical student and aspiring surgeon who sometimes works as a doctor illegally and is flunking medical school. When Adam contracts a dangerous disease, he seeks out his descendant to grant him his powers and pass on a legacy in an attempt for atone for his crimes, making Malik his heir and successor. Malik resolves to understand the plague infecting Adam, but ends up catching it himself, later learning that he and Adam are allergic to Nth Metal and suffering from metal toxicity. Malik also navigates his normal life possessing superhuman powers and works alongside Adam in battling the Akkad pantheon resurrected through alien bacteria assuming their forms, Ibac, and the Oni Grace, who has connections with the old Circle of Crow and seeks to usurp Teth's rulership. Malik assists Mary Marvel in the Lazarus Planet event, with the pair learning of Shazam's dilemma with the Rock of Eternity becoming one with him and resolving the problem.

== Bombshell ==
Bombshell (Amy Sue Allen) is a superheroine appearing in American comic books published by DC Comics. She first appeared in Teen Titans vol. 3, #38, and was created by Geoff Johns and Tony Daniel.

Bombshell was a member of the Teen Titans during the one-year gap after Infinite Crisis. She has similar powers to Captain Atom, having been bonded with the same alien metal as him at the insistence of her father, the head of Project Quantum. Bombshell is later revealed to be a traitor to the Titans; she threatens to kill Raven and attacks several members of the team, but is stopped by Ravager.

== Boom ==
Boom is the name of two characters in DC Comics.

=== First version ===
The first Boom is a rock-skinned alien who was previously locked into combat with another alien of his species named Thoom. They were recruited into the Poglachian Green Lantern Corps as part of a plot by the Weaponers of Qward to discredit the real Green Lantern Corps.

=== Judy Garrick ===
The New Golden Age reveals that Jay Garrick and Joan Garrick had a daughter, Judy Garrick, who inherited her father's superhuman speed and served as his sidekick before being kidnapped by the Time Masters and Childminder. When Red Arrow and Stargirl end up on Orphan Island, Red Arrow is captured by the Child Collectors and imprisoned along with Boom. Boom is among the Lost Children who are brought to the present day by Hourman, as returning them to their own time would cause a time paradox.

== Sy Borgman ==
Sy Borgman is a retired scooter-bound U.S. agent with cybernetic enhancements and an ally of Harley Quinn. He first appeared in Harley Quinn (vol. 2) #2 (March 2014) as part of The New 52.

Sy Borgman is a retired U.S. agent formerly called Syborg who was rendered scooter-bound and got cybernetic enhancements after stopping a terrorist plot. When Harley Quinn heads to her nursing home appointment, Sy Borgman recognizes her causing Harley to close the door behind her. He explains his history to her and states how he must use a scooter due to the weight of the cybernetics affecting his aged body. Sy wants to help Harley by targeting the gang that was responsible for his current cybernetic state.

=== Sy Borgman in other media ===
Sy Borgman appears in Harley Quinn, voiced by Jason Alexander. This version is a cyborg landlord, former CIA fixer, and member of Harley Quinn's crew. Additionally, he has a scientist sister named Mirielle, who was transformed into an octopus creature while trying to fuse a monkey and octopus to assist him in the field.

== Bork ==
Bork (Carl Bork) is a character. Introduced by Bob Haney and Neal Adams in The Brave and the Bold #81 (December 1968), the character was initially a criminal dockworker in Gotham City, but was imprisoned and later re-introduced as a member of the Power Company. Bork is a human transformed by a magical statue into a super-strong, durable monster.

=== Bork in other media ===
Carl Bork appears in The Flash episode "Seeing Red", portrayed by Andre Tricoteux.

== Boruka ==
Boruka is a character appearing in American comic books published by DC Comics. The character was created by writer Mark Waid and artist Dan Mora, and made her first appearance in Batman/Superman: World's Finest #21 (November 2023). Boruka was originally introduced as being from the alternative universe of Earth-22, the setting of Kingdom Come; her mainline counterpart was introduced shortly afterward in the series Justice League Unlimited.

Boruka is a jaguar-themed vigilante from Costa Rica whose mask allows her to control plants and animals. She assists the Justice League when the group Inferno threatens to destroy the Amazon rainforest, later joining the Justice League proper.

== Bouncer ==
- First appearance: Detective Comics #347 (January 1966)
- Created by: Gardner Fox; Carmine Infantino

Bouncer is an enemy of Batman who constructed a special suit out of alloy that gave him enhanced bouncing abilities. In their first encounter, he shot and killed Batman, who is replaced by the Batman of Earth-Two.

He later returned as a henchman for the Monarch of Menace. When Batman was missing, the Monarch of Menace hired various Batman villains to commit crimes for him, including the Bouncer, however he was once again defeated when Batman returned.

=== Bouncer in other media ===
Bouncer makes a non-speaking cameo appearance in the Batman: The Brave and the Bold episode "Joker: The Vile and the Villainous!".

== Bounder ==
Bounder is a Cairnian police officer who joined the Vril Dox and his R.E.B.E.L.S. team, to escape his corrupt world dedicated to galactical production of drugs.

== Sam Bradley Jr. ==
Sam Bradley Jr. is the son of Slam Bradley and a detective in the Gotham City Police Department. He was approved to work undercover as a costumed villain, taking the armor of Smart Bomb, who had recently been shot by Bradley's partners, in order to get close to Black Mask and also within Alexander Luthor Jr.'s Secret Society of Super Villains.

== Brainiac 3 ==
Brainiac 3 (Lyrl Dox) is a Coluan who is the son of Brainiac 2 (Vril Dox) and the Gryxian Stealth. Lyrl was born after Stealth went into heat and raped Vril Dox before killing him. Stealth becomes pregnant with Dox's child and gives birth in isolation on another planet, afraid of Dox's influence.

Even as a child, Lyrl demonstrates an advanced twelfth-level intelligence, leading his father to promote him to a senior position within L.E.G.I.O.N. However, Lyrl takes over L.E.G.I.O.N. utilizing his father's charisma program to brainwash the organization's members. Dox later gives Lyrl drugs that suppress his intelligence, making it average. During the Blackest Night storyline, Starro restores Lyrl's intelligence and exploits his abilities for his own use.

=== Brainiac 3 in other media ===
Brainiac 3 appears in Legion of Super-Heroes (2023), voiced by Zeno Robinson. This version is a clone of Brainiac and member of the Dark Circle who was created to steal the Miracle Machine. After his failure to do so, Brainiac fuses him into himself before Brainiac 5 manipulates Brainiac 3 and his fellow clones into fighting and killing one another from the inside.

== Breathtaker ==
Breathtaker is a name of two supervillains in DC Comics.

=== First version ===
The first Breathtaker is an unnamed assassin and the leader of the Assassination Bureau. He first appeared in Firestorm (vol. 2) #29 (November 1984), and was created by Joey Cavalieri and Rafael Kayanan.

Ostracized throughout his adolescence for being an albino dwarf, Breathtaker constructed a powerful exoskeleton and formed the Assassination Bureau.

=== Second version ===
The second Breathtaker is an unnamed female assassin who first appeared in Titans #21 (November 2000), and was created by Jay Faerber and Paul Pelletier. She specializes in murdering people by sucking away the air from their lungs, making it look like a natural death. She later contacted other people with similar abilities to form the team Hangmen. Breathtaker and her team are later killed by Crispus Allen as the Spectre.

=== Breathtaker in other media ===
- The second incarnation of Breathtaker appears in the Supergirl episode "In Plain Sight", portrayed by Luisa D'Oliveira. This version is an operative of Leviathan.
- An unidentified incarnation of Breathtaker appears in DC Universe Online.

== Anthony Bressi ==
Anthony "Tough Tony" Bressi was a mid-level mob boss in Gotham City, who was able to maintain his operations following the appearance of Batman, until he was ousted by Bane.

=== Anthony Bressi in other media ===
Anthony Bressi was intended to appear in Batgirl, portrayed by Jacob Scipio, prior to its cancellation.

== Brimstone ==
Brimstone is the name of several characters in DC Comics.

=== Artificial construct ===
Brimstone is an artificial construct created by Darkseid during the Legends storyline as a part of his plot to turn the population of Earth against their superheroes. Darkseid created Brimstone by implanting a nuclear reactor with a "techno-seed" which modifies it to create a giant, Brimstone. The heroes speculate that it is composed of superheated plasma.

=== Chris King ===
Brimstone is one of many identities used by Chris King, a wielder of the H-Dial who can transform into various heroes. In one mission, he uses the name Brimstone who has the powers of possession and gadgetry.

=== Nicholas Lucien ===
Nicholas Lucien is a criminal who lives on Earth-Two and has the ability to sense his Earth-One counterpart. His resentment of this unseen counterpart leads Lucien to a life of crime. By 1955, Lucien establishes himself as "Brimstone the Modern Mephistopheles", a criminal themed after Satan who possesses pyrokinesis. A fight with Earth-Two's Batman leaves Lucien in a coma for 28 years. While Lucien is comatose, he is imprisoned in Gotham State Penitentiary and his body atrophies. After awakening in 1983, Lucien possesses his Earth-One counterpart, who is a respected businessman, in a bid to kill the Earth-One Batman. After Batman defeats Lucien, he is forced back into his own body and paralyzed as a side effect of his mental projection across the dimensional barrier.

=== Joseph Chamberlain ===
Joseph Chamberlain originates from York Hills, a small but semi-prosperous town profiting from coal mining. Eventually, the coal mines of York Hills dry up and many of its residents leave. Joseph leaves town, but his car breaks down and he is picked up by a good Samaritan. The Samaritan introduces himself as "the Salesman" and tells Joseph that he intends to help him renovate York Hills. Joseph agrees and shakes the Salesman's hand in agreement. However, he is transformed into a fiery creature known as Brimstone. The Salesman reveals that he is a powerful entity from the Dark Multiverse who plans to put York Hills on the map by killing all of its inhabitants, an act that Brimstone will carry out. Joseph attempts to battle the Salesman and prevent him from destroying York Hills, but loses control of his powers after the Salesman kills his father, destroying York Hills in a burst of fire. Joseph and his sister Annie obtain a ledger containing the Salesman's plans and go on a road trip to stop him from committing further destruction.

=== Brimstone in other media ===
- Brimstone appears in Superboy, portrayed by Philip Michael Thomas.
- Brimstone appears in the Justice League Unlimited episode "Initiation".
- Brimstone makes a non-speaking cameo appearance in the Harley Quinn episode "So You Need a Crew?".
- Brimstone appears in Superman/Batman: Public Enemies.

== Casey Brinke ==
Casey Brinke is a comic book character from the comic series Space Case where she operates under the alias of the titular comic. Her father Richard became the villainous Torminox after contracting the Torminox virus. Danny the Street later gained the ability to bring her to life from her comic book. In her secret identity, Casey is an EMT.

=== Casey Brinke in other media ===
- Casey Brink appears in Doom Patrol, portrayed by Madeline Zima.
- Casey Brinke appears in the Young Justice episode "Nightmare Monkeys", voiced by Tara Strong.

== Brother Night ==
Brother Night (Eldon Peck) is a character appearing in American comic books published by DC Comics. Created by writer Paul Dini and artist Stéphane Roux, and first appearing in Zatanna (vol. 2) #1 (July 2010), the character is a San Francisco-based sorcerer and enemy of Zatanna who bargained with evil spirits to gain extended life in exchange for serving them. Zatanna defeats him by forcing him to renounce his powers, leading him to be tortured by the spirits for breaking his bargain with them.

=== Brother Night in other media ===
Brother Night appears in Justice League Action, voiced by Dan Donohue. This version is the owner of a nightclub that is primarily frequented by demons and offers power to those who desire it.

== Crystal Brown ==
Crystal Brown is a nurse who is the ex-wife of Arthur Brown and the mother of Stephanie Brown, and struggles with pain pill addiction.

=== Crystal Brown in other media ===
Crystal Brown appears in the Gotham Knights episode "Daddy Issues", portrayed by Sunny Mabrey.

== Bruno ==
Bruno is a Neo-Nazi criminal and gang leader operating in Gotham City who possesses distinctive swastika tattoos. Created by Frank Miller, she first appeared in The Dark Knight Returns #3 (August 1986).

=== Bruno in other media ===
Bruno appears in Batman: The Dark Knight Returns, voiced by Tress MacNeille.

== Brutale ==
Brutale (Guillermo Barrera) is a supervillain who first appeared in Nightwing (vol. 2) #22. He was created by Chuck Dixon and Scott McDaniel.

Brutale is an expert with all forms of knives and blades, utilizing a variety of scalpels, throwing knives, and other blades.

=== Brutale in other media ===
- Guillermo Barrera appears in the Arrow episode "Dead to Rights", portrayed by George Tchortov.
- Brutale makes a non-speaking cameo appearance in Superman/Batman: Public Enemies.
- Brutale appears as a character summon in Scribblenauts Unmasked: A DC Comics Adventure.

== Bud and Lou ==
Bud and Lou are a pair of spotted hyenas. The characters, created by Paul Dini and Bruce Timm, first appeared in the Batman: The Animated Series episode "The Man Who Killed Batman" and are officially named in The New Batman Adventures episode "Joker's Millions" before officially appearing in the main DC Universe in Harley Quinn #4 (March 2001). Their names are references to the comedy duo Abbott and Costello.

Bud and Lou are spotted hyenas who are the pets of Harley Quinn that were initially owned by the Joker, but they bonded to Harley because she was usually the one who fed them. When Harley Quinn wanted to go solo and formed her gang, their first mission was to free Bud and Lou from the Gotham City Zoo. At some point, white collar criminals stole Bud and Lou from Harley Quinn so that they can auction them off as exotic pets. Upon locating the place of the auction, Harley Quinn reclaimed her hyenas and had Poison Ivy wreck the place.

In The New 52 reboot of DC's continuity, Bud and Lou are still featured as Harley Quinn's pets. In the "Death of the Family" storyline, the Joker gives them rabies in an attempt to drive Harley mad and sics them on her, forcing Harley to (apparently) kill them in self-defense. In Harley Quinn's solo series, it is revealed that Bud and Lou survived the ordeal and recovered at a zoo, where they sired puppies with several of the zoo's female hyenas.

=== Bud and Lou in other media ===
- Bud and Lou appear in Krypto the Superdog, voiced by Peter Kelamis and Lee Tockar respectively. This version of the duo are enemies of Ace the Bat-Hound and are depicted with red fur.
- Bud and Lou appear in the Justice League Action episode "Garden of Evil".
- Bud and Lou appear in season two of Harley Quinn.
- Lou appears in the Teen Titans Go! episode "Jam".
- Bud and Lou appear in Injustice 2 as support characters for Harley Quinn.

== Bug ==
Bug is the name of several characters appearing in American comic books published by DC Comics.

=== Bug ===
The first Bug is a criminal who wears a helmet that enables him to control insects and rides around in a spider-like vehicle.

=== Bernard Bonner ===
Bernard Bonner is an electrokinetic supervillain in an insect-like suit who is the brother of Blythe Bonner / Byte. Byte is able to interface with technology, while Bug is able to transform into living electricity.

During the "Infinite Crisis" storyline, Bug and Byte appear as members of Alexander Luthor Jr.'s Secret Society of Super Villains.

=== Steel villain ===
This Bug is an insect-themed henchman of White Rabbit.

=== Maximums version ===
This version of Bug is a member of the Maximums, who were created by Joker using the powers of Mister Mxyzptlk. He is a pastiche of Spider-Man.

=== Bug in other media ===
The Bernard Bonner incarnation of Bug appears in The Flash episode "Godspeed", portrayed by an uncredited actor.

== Byte ==
Byte is a character appearing in American comic books published by DC Comics.

Blythe Bonner is an electrokinetic supervillain and the sister of Bernard Bonner. Byte is able to interface with technology, while Bug is able to transform into living electricity. They try to target a friend of Martin Stein, only to be defeated by Firestorm.

During the "Infinite Crisis" storyline, Bug and Byte appear as members of Alexander Luthor Jr.'s Secret Society of Super Villains.

In The New 52 continuity reboot, Blythe Bonner is a classmate of Jason Rusch.

=== Byte in other media ===
Byte appears in The Flash episode "Godspeed", portrayed by an uncredited actress.

== Byth Rok ==
Byth Rok is a supervillain appearing in American comic books published by DC Comics, and who is commonly known as a recurring enemy of the Silver Age Hawkman (Katar Hol). He is a scientist who stole a pill from the Thanagarian scientist Krotan, gaining shapeshifting abilities.

In the Hawkworld miniseries, Byth is a corrupt Wingman commander and Katar Hol's superior. He manipulated a drug-induced Katar into killing his father, aiding his rise to power. Now Administrator of Protection, he gains his shapeshifting powers from a new drug called Krotan. Katar Hol, with the help of Shayera Thal, uncovers his schemes but Byth escapes arrest.

In The New 52 continuity reboot, Byth creates Ultra the Multi-Alien by combining the DNA of several alien prisoners.

=== Byth Rok in other media ===
- Byth Rok appears in Green Lantern: The Animated Series, voiced by Tom Kenny. This version is the leader of a band of Thanagarian outlaws.
- Byth Rok appears in The All-New Batman: The Brave and the Bold #9.
