= Alliance (DC Comics) =

Fictional group of comic book extraterrestrials

The Alliance

Publication information
- Publisher: DC Comics
- First appearance: JLA/Haven: The Arrival #1 (January 2002)
- Created by: Ashley-Jayne Nicolaus (writer); Matthew P. Schuster (writer); Ariel Olivetti (artist)

In-story information
- Base(s): Competalia
- Member(s): Amon; Hank Velveeda; Ignetia; Katalia; Mavaar Lin; Nia; Siv; Tamlick Soffick; Valadin

The Alliance is a group of comic book extraterrestrials published by DC Comics. They first appeared in JLA/Haven: The Arrival #1 (January 2002), and were created by Ashley-Jayne Nicolaus, Matthew P. Schuster, and Ariel Olivetti.

== Publication history ==
The Alliance debuted in the JLA/Haven: The Arrival #1 one-shot which ended with the Competalians stranded on Earth. Their story was told over the course of a nine issue mini-series called Haven: Broken City which ran from February–October 2002. The story was wrapped up in JLA/Haven: Anathema (November 2002), the concluding one-shot which returned the Competalians to their homeworld.

== Fictional history ==
=== Competalia ===
The Alliance are a group of aliens from a planet called Competalia whose goal is the eradication of "Anathema", a geneticist who created a process which granted super powers to every living inhabitant of Competalia. Originally Anathema used her knowledge to uplift the Competalian people by discovering their equivalent of the metagene. Those whose powers were unlocked eventually lost their individuality and became known as the "Empowered". Anathema then built an army of these "Super-Competalians". Anyone who resisted was sent to the prison city of Haven.

=== Haven ===
Two million inhabitants resisted Anathema's control, however, and were forcibly placed in a massive penal colony called "The Haven". Haven was where Anathema sent political prisoners, regular criminals and the mentally ill, in preparation for a genocidal purge. Not long afterward, a rebel alliance was formed by the Competalian war hero Valadin and his brother Amon, who transformed Haven from a gulag into a habitable city. The rebel Alliance inside Haven duplicated Anathema's mutagenic "Empowerment Process" and used it to transform all of Haven's prisoners. Due to the inherent instability of Anathema's process, most of those treated experienced physical mutations, and some were driven insane. Most Havenites gained simple or useless talents. The empowerment process created by Siv is similar in concept to the Terrigen Mists that empower Marvel Comics' Inhumans. Siv had worked with Anathema to develop the original Competalian Empowerment Program.

=== Escape ===
The Competalians transformed the city into a starship and set course for a distant inhabitable planet. Certain volunteers were chosen to serve as the city's power source. The ship was sabotaged by a traitor inside Haven and crashes to Earth destroying the town of Lamont, California. The Justice League of America helped the Alliance restore the crippled Haven ship. The Haven ship remained in the state of California, while President of the United States Lex Luthor signed a bill formally recognizing it as a city of the United States. Meanwhile General Eugene Norville was stealing technology from Haven at President Luthor's request.

=== Anathema ===
One Competalian, a member of the Alliance named Maavar Lin, betrayed the Alliance's location to Anathema. Anathema hid the truth of her arrival and secretly began empowering and dominating humans, using her process to build a new army which she intended to use as a living power source which would enable her to activate the city's teleporter, and allow her to bring the Competalian army to Earth. Anathema was ultimately destroyed after Siv forced her body to revert to its original pre-empowerment Competalian form.

== Roster ==
- Amon - brother of Valadin who sacrificed his life for the city.
- Hank Velveeda - Havenite with innate knowledge of the inner workings of things.
- Ignetia - scientist and member of the Alliance.
- Katalia - telepath and member of the Alliance.
- Mavaar Lin - ex-chancellor of Haven turned traitor.
- Nia - member of the Alliance with super strength and endurance, flight.
- Siv - a genius engineer in control of an army of nanites, helped develop the Empowerment process.
- Tamlick Soffick - a member of the Alliance with minor control over gravity.
- Valadin - war hero with the ability to shoot bolts of energy from his body, leader of the Alliance.
