= Gamemnae =

Publication information
- Publisher: DC Comics
- First appearance: JLA #69 (September 2002)
- Created by: Joe Kelly; Doug Mahnke

In-story information
- Species: Atlantean
- Team affiliations: League of Ancients
- Abilities: Powerful magic wielder

Gamemnae is a fictional character appearing in American comic books published by DC Comics. She was an enemy of the Justice League. Gamemnae first appeared in JLA #69 and was created by Joe Kelly and Doug Mahnke.

Gamemnae appeared in live-action in the fifth and sixth seasons of the Arrowverse television series Supergirl portrayed by Cara Buono.

== Fictional character biography ==
Born over three thousand years ago, Gamemnae was an Atlantean, exiled at birth from Atlantis for having blonde hair - considered a curse in Atlantean culture. Surviving her exile, Gamemnae went on to learn powerful magic, which she later used to not only raise Atlantis from the seas, but turn the entire population into air-breathers as opposed to the water-breathing race they had been for centuries. Convinced that it was her destiny to lead the people of Atlantis in conquest of the world, Gamemnae established herself as ruler of her people, gradually learning further spells to increase her power.

However, Gamemnae learns that her efforts would be for nothing when Aquaman and the Atlanteans of the twenty-first century are banished to the past. Outraged to learn that Atlantis would return to being water-breathers in the future, Gamemnae seduces Aquaman, tricks him into drinking a potion that turns him into a water spirit, and traps him in a pool of water. After reading Aquaman's mind, Gamemnae learns of the Justice League of the future. Determined to defeat them, Gamemnae founds the League of Ancients.

Gamemnae gives false visions of the future to Rama Khan, causing him to believe that he had foreseen a future where Earth is threatened by a seven-headed hydra destroyer — the remaining members of the Justice League — and that a team would have to be assembled to defeat the threat posed by this destroyer. The Justice League arrive in the past to rescue Aquaman and the Atlanteans, but are killed in battle with Rama Khan and Gamemnae. Manitou Raven uses the souls of the deceased Justice League members to trap Gamemnae in Atlantis.

Awakened in the present, Gamemnae drains the water from the entire world to force humanity to submit to her, only to be opposed by a "reserve League" created by Batman in the event the original League was killed or defeated. Unable to defeat Gamemnae in the present, Nightwing, Hawkgirl, Zatanna, and Firestorm travel back in time to disrupt Gamemnae's connection to Atlantis in the past. They free Aquaman, who sinks Atlantis.

In the present, the remaining Leaguers confront Gamemnae with the aid of the resurrected corpses of the League she had already killed. Unable to absorb the dead, Gamemnae is forced to resurrect the League. As Gamemnae vows to banish the water and send Earth into the sun, the League keeps Earth's orbit stable as the water drained by Gamemnae returns. As the past Atlantis collapses, the Atlanteans return to the present with Manitou Raven. The destruction of Atlantis in the past ends Gamemnae's attempt to conquer Earth, leaving her for dead.

== Powers and abilities ==
Gamemnae is an expert magic wielder. Her demonstrated spells were capable of physically manipulating large numbers of people, ranging from turning the entire population of Atlantis into air-breathers to converting Aquaman into a water wraith. She was also shown to be capable of using a quagmire spell to absorb the bodies of others into herself; few people would risk using such a spell on more than two or three people, yet Gamemnae was able to absorb half a dozen people and remain relatively stable. She was even shown to be capable of reviving the dead; when the dead Justice League were reanimated to fight her, Gamemnae was able to bring them back to life (with the goal of killing them properly).

== In other media ==
- Gamemnae appears in Supergirl, portrayed by Cara Buono. This version is a member of Leviathan who originates from the planet Jarhanpur.
- Gamemnae appears as a character summon in Scribblenauts Unmasked: A DC Comics Adventure.
