= Manitou (DC Comics) =

- The current Manitou, Manitou Dawn. Art by Doug Mahnke, Tom Nguyen, and David Baron.

Publication information
- Publisher: DC Comics
- First appearance: Manitou Raven: JLA #66 (July 2002); Maniou Dawn: JLA #75 (January 2003)
- Created by: Joe Kelly; Doug Mahnke

In-story information
- Alter ego: Raven; Dawn
- Species: Homo Magi
- Place of origin: North America (11th century BC)
- Team affiliations: Justice League; Justice League Elite; League of Ancients; Sisterhood of the Sleight Hand
- Abilities: Both versions of the character are experts in magic drawn from Native American shamanism, other magical practices, and from various artifacts.

The Manitou is the codename and title of Native American superheroes appearing in American comic books published by DC Comics. With the original version of the character was created by Joe Kelly and Doug Mahnke and debuted in JLA #66 (July 2002), the second version debuted later in JLA #75 (January 2003). Inspired by Apache Chief, the characters are among notable Native American superheroes. They have been criticized as a caricature due to being an amalgamation of different tribes, common regulation of having supernatural powers, and confusion of different indigenous cultures.

A legacy hero role rooted within ancient Native Americans, Raven is a mystic master from the ancestral people who would become the Apache and inherited his role. Assisted by his wife, he was member of the a coalition of super-powered champions until an encounter with the 21st century Justice League, wherein he and his wife move into the future. Eventually killed, he is succeeded by his wife. Dawn, beginning as her rebellious woman who first challenged traditional norms and later wedded Raven despite a turbulent start, acts as his assistant as the pair settle in the future before she succeeds him. As the Manitou, she inherit his powers and becomes a philanthropist.

Thus far, the Manitou Raven version has only appeared as a playable character in Scribblenauts Unmasked: A DC Comics Adventure.

== Fictional character biographies ==
=== Manitou Raven ===
Manitou Raven, the predecessor of Manitou Dawn.

==== Earlier background and history ====
Within the DC Universe, the Manitou role is a legacy hero originally passed down in Raven's family. By 1000 BCE, the role had passed down to Raven, homo magi whom were ancestors to the future Apache people. Raven had first met his future wife, Dawn, in a turbulent time when she exiled from her clan due to her free-spirited personality. Although she had fought his dog, sold his horses, and burned down his home, he came to both forgive and fall in love with Dawn. The rulers of Atlantis, Rama Khan and Gamemnae, recruit the two to become founding members of the League of Ancients.

==== Justice League Elite and onwards ====
Unbeknownst to Raven, Gamemnae manipulates him into battling the Justice League in a bid to take over the world. After helping the League defeat her, Raven joins the group, replacing Jason Blood as a magic specialist, and is transported to the present day. Vera Black recruits Raven and Dawn into Justice League Elite, a black ops team. A hardliner in his work, his neglect for his wife culminates to her having an affair with Green Arrow, a fact he mystically learns and blames himself for the ordeal. Despite this, Raven sacrifices himself to save Green Arrow and returns as a spirit, forgiving Dawn despite her grief and continued guilt of the affair before granting her his mantle and power, defying traditional norms of the Manitou, and urging her to accept her destiny as such while employing the form of a raven to act as her spiritual guide.

=== Manitou Dawn ===
==== Early history and background ====
Originating from homo magi clan and one of the ancestors of the future Apache, she was known to be a more free-spirited woman who defied traditional norms in her clan as a teenager. When she was intended to be paired with her tribe's chief, who intended to rape her, she killed him and was exiled. Stumbling into his home, she had killed his dog, sold his horses, and had a turbulent relationship with his initially that led to her burning down his home. Despite this, the pair fell in love. As a wife and sorceress, she often assisted him as he became a founding member of the League of Ancients.

==== Life in the future and the new Manitou ====
After Raven and Dawn help the Justice League thwart Gamemnae's plans of world domination, they agree to join the group in the present day, becoming their primary mystic consultants following the resignation of Jason Blood. While she navigates the different cultural norms, advancement of technology, and learning the English language, she befriends several members of the League such as Firestorm. When Raven is recruited into the Justice League Elite, he become more neglectful of his attention to her, resulting in a rift formulating from his superhero work and accumulates into her having an affair with Green Arrow despite initially resisting his advances, which he magically discovers. Holding no animosity despite the affair and blaming himself, he sacrifices his life to save Green Arrow and his spirit imparts his mantle and power to Dawn, whom is grieving and doubts being worthy of his forgiveness. As the new Manitou, she assists the Elite in concluding their final case and plays a crucial role in uncovering the team's traitor, Menagerie.

Dawn has since taken a semi-active role in the Justice League; she is present for Aquaman's ceremony that disbands the JLA. There, she meets Black Canary, who pieces together Dawn's former affair with Green Arrow and critiques him for taking advantage of her due to her being younger. During Infinite Crisis, Dawn is a key player in stopping the Key, who had developed powerful telepathy. In Reign of Doomsday, Dawn works with Zatanna to find Supergirl after Doomsday kidnaps her.

==== DC Rebirth ====
The "DC Rebirth" relaunch initiative reintroduces Manitou Dawn with an updated backstory as a philanthropist whose possess magic derived from Hecate's power, making her among the "witchmarked". Hecate compels Dawn to attack Nanda Parbat and Rama Kushna before Zatanna and John Constantine free her.

== Characterization ==
=== Raven ===
Raven is a North American shaman originating from around 1000B.C, his people and clan predating the Apache people as their ancestor, and is described as being known for his humility, sensitivity, and "quiet strength", rivaling Gamemnae's mystical prowess. Despite this, however, he is derogatorily considered "savage" by his fellow ancients due to his ethnic background. In his debut storyline, Raven foresees Gamemnae's sinister personalities and succeeds Jason Blood as the Justice League's mystical expert.

=== Dawn ===
The wife of Raven, Dawn is described as being more rebellious, free-spirit, and defied traditional norms from their clan, having been nicknamed the "Goat" as a result. A sorceress, she often aided her husband in his magic although their martial rift following his inclusion in the Justice League was a reoccurring problem, stemming from the intense focus required in using their variant of magic. Dawn eventually succeeds her husband as Manitou. As Manitou, she is given her husband's responsibilities although as a newcomer in the League, her confidence in the role is challenged. In DC Rebirth, the character is more experienced, acting as a philanthropist based New Mexico while also a member of the Sisterhood of the Sleight Hand, a society founded to help female practitioners learn magic.

== Powers and abilities ==
Both versions of the character are shamans possessing powers rooted in Native American shamanism; also classified as sorcerers, the pair use enchanted objects to amplify their abilities and safeguard themselves from the risks associated with magic. Manitou Raven's abilities includes extensive supernatural knowledge of both his own and outside cultures and a broad range of powers, such as traversing the astral plane through rituals, manipulating time, and necromancy. Conversely, Dawn held supernatural powers on own but upon assuming the role of Manitou, these powers were enhanced from inheriting her husband's energies. Her repertoire of powers includes scrying, empathy, and mystic energy manipulation.

Both Manitou also held several magical artifacts, such as a magical hatchet, originating from Raven's father, which harms evildoers. Others include a dreamcatcher, created by Raven's mother, that houses historical knowledge, a magical headdress that grants knowledge of past Manitou holders, a ferret-like totem animal companion known as Po-Pokta that can move at high speeds, and a magical medicine stick acting as a manifestation of Raven's spirit, which is nigh-indestructible. Dawn later uses the weapon herself.

== Cultural impact ==
With both characters recognized as one of DC's prominent Native American superheroes, the characters have been examined in context of representation of Native American characters in fictional settings. Aspects of Manitou Raven's character has been criticized much in part due to the character being a mishmash depiction of several Native American tribes; the character's codename originates from Algonquian peoples rather than the Apache, the magical phrase "Inuchuk" having Inuit connections, his powers derived from supernatural sources, and his namesake and theme originating from other tribes geographically differing from the Apache. Expert in Native American studies Michael A. Sheyahshe echoed similar sentiments and inaccuracies while he spoke on misrepresentation of First Nations people. He critiques the character due to his portrayal as a pre-Columbian Indigenous figure, his design blending elements from different Native cultures inaccurately, his use of "Inuchuk" to use his powers, and outdated gender attitudes contributing to a stereotypical depiction and creating a "shell identity" that lacked authenticity while continuing a "Dead Indian" trope, where Native culture is frozen in the past, erasing the reality of living Indigenous peoples today while falsely suggesting authenticity.

== In other media ==
Manitou Raven appears as a character summon in Scribblenauts Unmasked: A DC Comics Adventure.
