= Newsboy Legion =

Fictional kid gang in the DC Comics Universe

- The original Newsboy Legion (from left to right: Gabby, Bigwords, Tommy, and Scrapper) in Star Spangled #7 (April 1942). Art by Jack Kirby.

Publication information
- Publisher: DC Comics
- First appearance: Star-Spangled Comics #7 (April 1942)
- Created by: Joe Simon; Jack Kirby

In-story information
- Member(s): Tommy Tompkins; Big Words; Gabby; Scrapper; Flippa Dippa

The Newsboy Legion is a teenage vigilante group in the DC Comics Universe. Created by Joe Simon and Jack Kirby, they appeared in their own self-titled feature which ran from Star-Spangled Comics #7 (April 1942) to #64 (January 1947). In 1970, Jack Kirby introduced a new Newsboy Legion, made up of the sons of the original Golden Age characters.

== Fictional character biography ==
=== Pre-Crisis version ===
The Newsboy Legion is a group of orphans, living on the streets of Suicide Slum, selling newspapers to make a living. They were also frequently in trouble with the law, although local policeman Jim Harper had a soft spot for them. In their first appearance, Harper, shortly after becoming Guardian, also becomes the Newsboys' legal guardian. A recurring theme in their stories was that the boys suspected Harper was the Guardian but were unsure.

The Newsboy Legion consisted of Tommy Tompkins (the leader); Big Words (the team genius); Gabby (an excitable kid who never stopped talking); and Scrapper (the tough guy).

The Newsboy Legion were reintroduced in Superman's Pal Jimmy Olsen #133 (October 1970) as part of Jack Kirby's Fourth World story arc. The members of this Legion are the sons of the originals, who now work at a government genetics project. A new addition to the team was Walter Johnson (nicknamed Flip), an African-American boy and excellent swimmer.

During their first mission, the villainous Morgan Edge develops the Whiz Wagon for the unsuspecting boys. He attempts to use it and them (and by extension, Jimmy Olsen) to kill the Hairies, an underground, technologically advanced society. Assisting the Legion in fighting the Factory was a clone of Scrapper called 'Scrapper Trooper', who was designed for military support of the Project.

The boys would become affected by the Project in other ways, such as befriending an experiment from the 'Evil Factory'. They called this large, pink, humanoid entity 'Angry Charlie'. He was the only survivor from the Factory. The police authorities from Scotland, where the Factory had been hiding, allowed the Legion to maintain custody of the entity.

=== Post-Crisis version ===
Members of the Newsboy Legion as drawn in "Superman - Funeral for a Friend".

Post-Crisis, the Newsboy Legion's 1940s history was unchanged, as was their later involvement with the DNA Project (now called Project Cadmus). Instead of having identical sons, however, the new Newsboy Legion were now said to be clones created by the same technology that recreated the Guardian as part of an Apokolips plot that went wrong. Like the Guardian clone, they shared their "father's" memories, at least up to their current age, meaning that they were sometimes unfamiliar with the modern world. They first appeared in this form in Superman (vol. 2) Annual #2 (1988), written by Roger Stern, and were extensively featured in Karl Kesel's run on The Adventures of Superman, including breaking Kon-El out of Cadmus.

The post-Crisis Newsboys were also given real names: Big Words was Anthony Rodriguez; Gabby was Johnny Gabrielli and Scrapper was Patrick MacGuire. They were briefly joined by the Guardian's niece "Famous" Bobby Harper, but she subsequently went to stay with another relative.

In Superman's Pal Jimmy Olsen (2008), the original Newsboy Legion members are killed by Codename: Assassin as part of a conspiracy headed by Sam Lane to kill all Kryptonians.

=== Seven Soldiers version ===
In Grant Morrison's new take on the Guardian in Seven Soldiers: The Guardian, the Manhattan Guardian newspaper has a citywide network of volunteer reporters called the "Newsboy Army".

Later in that same series, a group called the Newsboy Army was active during the forties in an area of New York called Nowhere Street. This group consisted of Captain 7 (an African-American boy in a football uniform), Ali Ka-Zoom (a young stage magician), Vincenzo 'Kid Scarface' Baldi (an Italian boy in an impeccable suit), Chop Suzi (an Asian girl, the team's mechanic), Edward 'Baby Brain' Stargard (an infant prodigy), Little Miss Hollywood (an impressionist, the daughter of Irish immigrants) and Millions (the world's richest dog). In their final mission as a team, they are cursed by the Terrible Time Tailor to be given horrible fates to prevent them from stopping his plans for the Harrowing.

Millions "dies" shortly thereafter. It is widely assumed that Cap impregnates Suzi, as his designation after the encounter with the Terrible Time Tailor is "child molester". However, the crossword puzzle included in Seven Soldiers #1 implies that Suzi may have given birth to twins, fathered by Baby Brain - despite obvious physical obstacles. Cap is subsequently killed by the others. Hollywood becomes an alcoholic 'super-impressionist'. Ali Ka-Zoom masters genuine magic, goes mad, and dies, and Kid Scarface became Vincenzo the Undying Don, the leader of the L.A. underworld and is killed by the Sheeda. Baby Brain survives to found the Manhattan Guardian newspaper. Ali Ka-Zoom has shown up alive in 52. In Seven Soldiers #1, it is revealed that Kid Scarface/Don Vincenzo actually bathed Millions in the Cauldron of Rebirth, and Millions inherited Vincenzo's property after his death, becoming the "Dogfather".

=== The New Golden Age ===
In the storyline "Stargirl: The Lost Children", the Newsboy Legion are among the lost sidekicks on Orphan Island. After escaping the island, the Newsboy Legion are brought to the present, as returning them to their time would cause a time paradox.

== Collections ==
DC has published two hardback collections:

- The Newsboy Legion v1, 2010, ISBN 1-4012-2593-4 (reprints Star Spangled Comics #7-32).
- The Newsboy Legion v2, 2017, ISBN 978-1-4012-7236-4 (reprints Star Spangled Comics #33-64).

== Other versions ==
In Elseworld's Finest, the Legion is a small sub-group of Newsboys which includes a young Jimmy Olsen.

== In other media ==
- The Newsboy Legion make a cameo appearance in the Justice League Unlimited episode "Patriot Act".
- A genderbent incarnation of the Newsboy Legion called the Newsgirl Legion appear in the Young Justice episode "First Impressions", consisting of Tommi Thompkins (voiced by Mae Whitman), Gabi Gabrielli (voiced by Grey Griffin) and Antonia "Big Words" Rodriguez (voiced by Zehra Fazal). This version of the Legion is a social media-inspired group based in Brooklin, Maine.
- The Newsboy Legion, renamed the Newskid Legion, appears in My Adventures with Superman, consisting of Big Words and female incarnations of Scrapper (renamed Patty), Gabby, and Flip Johnson (voiced by Azuri Hardy-Jones). Following minor appearances in the first season, they become interns at the Daily Planet in the second season.
