= Nebula Man =

Publication information
- Publisher: DC Comics
- First appearance: Justice League of America #100 (August 1972)
- Created by: Len Wein (writer); Dick Dillin (artist)

In-story information
- Species: Sentient universe
- Notable aliases: Neh-Buh-Loh; Qwewq

Nebula Man is a character in DC Comics. He first appeared in Justice League of America #100–101 (1972).

Originally a villain responsible for the disappearance of the Seven Soldiers of Victory, he has since reappeared as Neh-Buh-Loh, the primary antagonist in the 2005–2006 series Seven Soldiers by Grant Morrison. Prior to this reappearance, Morrison built up the character's backstory, starting in 1997 with more extensive appearances in JLA: Classified (2005).

== Fictional character biography ==
Nebula Man first appears in Justice League of America #100, described as a cosmic being "whose touch has the power of 20 atomic bombs". He was supposedly created by a villain known as the Hand to defeat the original Seven Soldiers of Victory. Nebula Man scatters the Soldiers through time, a fate from which they are saved by the Justice League and Justice Society. The Nebula Man is defeated when the sidekick of the Crimson Avenger, Wing, sacrifices himself to deliver the final blow with a cosmic device.

In the storyline "Rock of Ages", Metron sends the Flash, Aquaman, and Green Lantern through time and space, with the three landing on Wonderworld. During a tour of Wonderworld's Omnitropolis and its museum district by Mote, the three are shown a growing larval universe called Qwewq.

Nebula Man appears once more in Stars and S.T.R.I.P.E., before reappearing in JLA: Classified #1–3, working with Gorilla Grodd and announcing the end of the world. At the same time, the Justice League are in the universe of Qwewq, unaware that it is Nebula Man's larval form.

In the Seven Soldiers series, Nebula Man is revealed to be an ally of the Sheeda, a humanoid species from one billion years in the future. He serves as the personal huntsman of Sheeda queen Gloriana Tenebrae. Nebula Man is killed by Frankenstein, who exploits a flaw placed in him as an infant by the Ultramarine Corps.

== Other versions ==
In All-Star Superman #10, Superman uses the infant universe of Qwewq to create an Earth without a Superman that he dubs Earth Q.
