= Endless Winter =

2020 DC Comics crossover event

- Publisher: DC Comics
- Publication date: December 1 – December 29, 2020
- Genre: Superhero
Title(s)
Justice League: Endless Winter; The Flash (Vol. 1); Justice League (Vol. 4); Aquaman (Vol. 8); Justice League Dark (Vol. 2)
- Main character(s): Justice League; Justice League Dark; Teen Titans; Black Adam; Swamp Thing; Viking Prince; Hippolyta; Frost King

Creative team
- Writer(s): Andy Lanning and Ron Marz
- Artist(s): Howard Porter, Phil Hester, Jess Merino, Brandon Peterson, and Carmine Di Giandomenico

"Endless Winter" is a 2020 crossover event in DC Comics publications. Written by Andy Lanning and Ron Marz, the story follows the Frost King's efforts to cause an eternal global winter and the Justice League's efforts to stop him. Taking place in the New Justice relaunch, the story appeared in nine issues spread across five comic titles published over five weeks in December 2020.

== Publication history ==
DC first announced the storyline in July 2020. Initially planned to last two months as part of a major relaunch/rebranding effort by the publisher, by September it had been compressed to a five-week event. DC further advertised the story in a special 6-page section of their comics released on November 17.

The crossover was spread across nine issues of various comic book titles, beginning and ending with the two-issue limited series titled Justice League: Endless Winter. Additional chapters appeared in issues of the ongoing series Flash, Aquaman, Justice League, and Justice League Dark and in three one-shot specials focused on the characters of Superman, Teen Titans, and Black Adam. The comics were all released between December 1 and 29, 2020.

At a panel discussion during the October 2020 New York Comic Con, writer Ron Marz said the story came together around "Justice League Viking", a 10th-century version of the modern superhero team.

== Plot ==
In the distant past, there was a man named Edwald Olaffson who developed ice powers after saving his son from a polar bear attack in Greenland in the 10th century. He attempted to use his powers for good, but accidentally caused famine and eventually became a being known as the Frost King.

In the 10th century, Hippolyta, Swamp Thing, and Viking Prince free Black Adam to deal with the Frost King when he threatens to destroy the world. Adam discovers Frost King's identity and uses his family as bait to distract the Frost King, but the Frost King accidentally kills his family and escapes.

In the present, the Justice League (Batman, Superman, Wonder Woman, Flash, Green Lantern, Martian Manhunter, and Aquaman) thwarts an attempted bank robbery by Multiplex, Icicle, and Catman. Meanwhile in Greenland, Simon Stagg's son Sebastian discovers a new ice strain that can achieve cold fusion. The workers on the Snow Crawler inform Sebastian that a storm will hit in an hour and he orders them to pick up the pace despite their reluctance. The Justice League arrives to help deal with the ice beings, but the Frost King emerges and attacks the heroes.

Flash runs around the world trying to help everyone while the other heroes deal with the Frost King's monsters. Flash passes out after being ambushed by the monsters, but Black Adam rescues him and Flash saves Iris West.

In the present, Jimmy Olsen and Lois Lane are about to be killed by ice monsters on top of the Daily Planet building when Superman saves them. After making sure they are safe, Superman goes out to help people, but is soon overwhelmed. In Gotham City, Sebastian Stagg and his research team are still trying to uncover the secrets of the ice sample taken from the Arctic Circle. They have discovered that the ice contains Kryptonian crystals and a mysterious energy signature. They have also discovered that there are people buried underneath the ice and they are still alive.

Meanwhile, the Teen Titans allow children to stay in Titans Tower to wait out the snowstorm. The Teen Titans decide to go to Brooklyn to deal with ice monsters and help a metahuman named Summer Zahid deal with an ice monster. While recovering, Flash, Cyborg, and Starfire travel to Titan Tower to check on the heroes. Donna Troy realizes the Frost King is the story that Hippolyta told her when she was in Themiscyra and tells Cyborg to teleport her and Flash there to help the Amazons.

Zatanna tells Wonder Woman that they need to go to New Myria to find Swamp Thing. They succeed, but learn that the Frost King is weakening Swamp Thing's powers. Back on Earth, Hippolyta summons the spirit of the Viking Prince, who explains that they need to find Frost King's family to find him. Wonder Woman and Zatanna arrive holding an empty vessel of Swamp Thing that possesses the Viking Prince.

Silver Banshee, Icicle, Catman, Rampage, Black Adam, and the Frost King arrive at Stagg Enterprises to take the frozen Frost King's family. Multiplex tries helping Adam, but is killed by Frost King. Adam threatens to kill Frost King's family. Before Adam can be killed, Superman, Wonder Woman, Flash, Batman, and Green Lantern arrive.

Batman reveals that he let Sebastian Stagg be used as bait to find the Frost King, the heroes start fighting against him. Batman and Hippolyta find the Frost King's true body in the Fortress of Solitude. Black Adam nearly kills Frost King, but Superman stops him and they both fight while the Frost King regains his strength. Aquaman arrives with Fire Trolls to help turn the tide, ultimately defeating the Frost King. In the aftermath, Sebastian Stagg is arrested, the Viking Prince returns to the afterlife, Swamp Thing finds a new avatar, and Superman rebuilds the Fortress. It is revealed that the Frost King is still alive, but has entered stasis until his family is freed.

== Critical reception ==
The story received positive reviews from critics for its action and art style, but there was criticism of the underdeveloped plot. According to review aggregator Comic Book Roundup, the crossover received a score of 7.7 out of 10 based on 52 reviews.

The second chapter appeared in The Flash #767. Bleeding Cool criticized it for not revealing new information nor moving the plot along, and found it lackluster compared to previous work by the writers and art team.

== Collected edition ==
Title	Material collected	Published date	ISBN
Justice League: Endless Winter	Justice League: Endless Winter #1-2, The Flash #767, Superman: Endless Winter Special #1, Aquaman #66, Justice League #58, Teen Titans: Endless Winter Special #1, Justice League Dark #29, Black Adam: Endless Winter Special #1	November 2021	978-1779511539
