= Shining Knight (Ystina) =

- Artwork for the cover of Seven Soldiers: Shining Knight #2 (2005) by Simone Bianchi

Publication information
- Publisher: DC Comics
- First appearance: Seven Soldiers: Shining Knight #1 (August 2005)
- Created by: Grant Morrison (writer); Simone Bianchi (artist)

In-story information
- Alter ego: Ystin
- Team affiliations: Seven Soldiers; Knights of the Broken Table; Demon Knights; Council of Immortals; Justice League Queer; Justice League
- Abilities: Unusually strong and resilient to damage, swordplay, can fly on winged horse "Vanguard".

Shining Knight (Ystina) is a fictional character from DC Comics. They are the third character named Shining Knight and appears as a major character from Seven Soldiers. In The New 52 reboot, the character is reimagined as intersex.

== Publication history ==
Ystin was originally created by Grant Morrison and Simone Bianchi as a modern female version of the original Sir Justin within the Seven Soldiers miniseries.

When writing about The New 52 version of the character in Demon Knights, Paul Cornell admitted to Newsarama, that "he wants the reader to make up their own mind on Ystin" but also noting that "in the case of something as fundamental as identity, I think some level of clarity is essential, especially if it's a marginalized identity where the average reader might not know what conclusion they're jumping to, or any attendant misconceptions about sex and gender they may have". Demon Knights writer Paul Cornell was deliberately ambiguous about the character's gender until the fourteenth issue, where Ystin says: "I'm both [genders]... I was born this way". Cornell later called Ystin transgender on social media and asked for more detail by Newsarama, Cornell said: "I think that's down to what each individual reader wants from that exchange, or most identifies with. Why shut down any of the possibilities?" Ystin's torture in Hell was to be forced to display his gender publicly.

== Fictional character biographies ==
=== Seven Soldiers ===
In 2005, a new Shining Knight debuted in Grant Morrison's Seven Soldiers megaseries. This new DC Comics version is a creation of Grant Morrison and Simone Bianchi, based on original Shining Knight.

This new Shining Knight is also named Sir Justin (in the story, the knights of Camelot speak Welsh, so sometimes the Welsh equivalent "Ystin" is used) and has a winged horse, but it seems much more out of place in the modern age.

Ystin is clearly a Celtic mythology version of the original Shining Knight (who was based more on the quasi-medieval setting of Sir Thomas Malory). The story explains that Camelot is a recurring archetype. Ystin comes from about 8,000 BC, before the 6th century Camelot of Sir Justin.

Ystin, a long-haired 'schoolboy' of Camelot, is knighted and dubbed the Shining Knight by Sir Galahad, just before the fall of Camelot. Unbeknownst to Galahad, Ystin is actually a girl who is in love with him. Ystin and her winged horse Vanguard confront Gloriana Tenebrae, the Sheeda-Queen, who takes them to Castle Revolving, the floating fortress of the Sheeda. Gloriana casually informs the young knight that she has stolen the sword Excalibur, one of the Seven Imperishable Treasures. Ystin breaks free, steals Excalibur, and escapes from the Castle - only to fall to earth in modern Los Angeles, some 10,000 years later. There, she is confronted by Guilt, a Sheeda Mood 7 Mind Destroyer, who 'kills with words'.

Guilt informs her that the Sheeda broke Camelot and created a nightmare kingdom in its place, ruled by the undead King Mordredd. Without the goodness of Camelot to inspire them, the kingdoms of Avalon (which took up all the world) committed suicide. Guilt taunts Ystin, saying that the war might have been won if Ystin had not run away. When Ystin saves a homeless man (implied to be Ali Ka-Zoom), from some thugs, Guilt evaporates. Ystin, newly enlightened, seeks out the police.

The police contact two women: Agent Helen Helligan, a metahuman specialist for the FBI, and Doctor Gloria Friday, an expert on pre-Atlantean civilization. With Friday's uncanny grasp of ancient Welsh, they learn of Ystin's predicament. Suddenly, as the clock strikes midnight, Friday reveals that she is the Sheeda-Queen, and promptly incapacitates Ystin before poisoning Helligan.

Back at Castle Revolving, Gloriana reveals that Ystin is not the last of the Knights. In the final days of the Age of Camelot, the Sheeda kidnapped Galahad and broke his spirit, remaking him as a degenerate brute. For the Sheeda-Queen's twisted amusement, Ystin and Galahad are made to duel each other. Ystin attempts to reason with Galahad, but he is beyond her reach and mercilessly attacks her. Just then, the Queen gets a whiff of Ystin's menstrual blood and reveals that Ystin is a girl. Gloriana then leaves Galahad to torture Ystin into joining the Sheeda side. Ystin pleads with Galahad one last time, before resolving that her mentor and the man she loves is truly gone. With one mighty strike, Ystin kills Galahad. With tears in her eyes, Ystin vows to come after Gloriana and exact revenge.

There is a subplot concerning Vincenzo the Undying Don, the leader of the Los Angeles underworld, who acquires Vanguard from the police. He also owns the second of the Seven Imperishable Treasures, the Cauldron of Rebirth and Plenty. Ne-Bu-Loh and Spyder, servants of the Sheeda-Queen, kills Vincenzo in the hopes that he will lead them to the Cauldron. He does, remarking when he emerges that 'these are the end times, when we make peace with what we are'. Vincenzo and his servitors all die, but Vanguard escapes to Gorias to get reinforcements for the final battle.

Seven Soldiers #1 reveals that Ystin's original name is Justina (or more accurately, Ystina). Following the defeat of the Sheeda, Justina abandons her facade of being a boy and enrolls in a 21st-century school. She laments being stranded in our era and failing her king and fellow knights. Ystina is informed by the magician Ali Ka-Zoom of sketchy records of a great queen called "Ystina the Good" who helped restore the Sheeda-ravaged world centuries ago. Whether she returns to the past and assumes this role remains to be seen.

Ystina is also seen in the battle for Metropolis in Infinite Crisis #7 attacking the Riddler.

Ystina makes a brief appearance in week 50 of the maxi-series 52, helping dozens of heroes battle Black Adam. Fellow 'Soldier' Manhattan Guardian assists in the battle. This fight is also detailed in the fourth issue of the "World War III" tie-in series.

She later appeared in the "New Deal" arc of the Teen Titans. After losing various members due to events such as Battle for the Cowl and Terror Titans, Cassie Sandsmark tasks Kid Devil with recruiting new heroes for the team. He approaches Ystina with the intent of asking her to join, only to be chased off after she mistakes him for a demon.

=== New 52 ===
In The New 52 (a 2011 reboot of the DC Comics universe), Ystin is either a trans man or nonbinary. Ystin lived in a Celtic incarnation of Camelot as a squire, under Artus the Bear King. The Daemonites, ravagers of every attempt at Camelot, destroyed it and left Ystin for dead; Merlin fed him from the Grail and granted him immortality. With his horse Vanguard, the Shining Knight subconsciously searched Earth for the Grail so Merlin could resurrect Camelot. When immortality was too much, they took long slumbers under hillsides. Ystin was unaware of the later Camelot that Madame Xanadu and Jason Blood lived in and used to believe they were lying.

In Dark Ages Europe, Ystin joined the 'Demon Knights' at the town of Little Spring and joined them on a quest to Avalon. Ystin and his comrade Exoristos formed a relationship during their time together. During an early battle against the Questing Queen, Ystin had a vision of Merlin giving him the option to cease searching for the Grail, as the search would bring "great sorrow"; he decided to continue. At Avalon, Ystin was knighted by King Arthur as part of the realm's agents on Earth: the original Stormwatch. He departed with Exoristos to continue searching for the Grail.

Thirty years later, the Demon Knights are brought together again by an aged Al Jabr to fight the vampire Cain. Sir Ystin had been aware from his visions that he would one day become a vampire and while the team defeated Cain, the Knight was bitten and temporarily turned into a vampire.

== Other versions ==
=== Titans Tomorrow ===
An older version of Ystina appears in Teen Titans #52 as a member of the Titans Army from the Titans Tomorrow future.

== Reception ==
Charlotte Finn of ComicsAlliance felt that Ystin is not a particularly complex character, but has potential, clarifying that he "could be a sterling, if somewhat blood-soaked, representative of whatever expression Sir Ystin is", and that transgender characters deserve to be seen in the mirrors of "ourselves".

The character was acknowledged by The Advocate as someone who would be great to see in a Justice League film as an example of a modern, positive outlook on intersex superheroes.
