= Justice League Dark =

Fictional superhero team appearing in DC Comics

- Textless cover of Justice League Dark #9 (July 2012), art by Ryan Sook

Publication information
- Publisher: DC Comics
- First appearance: Justice League Dark #1 (2011)
- Created by: Peter Milligan

In-story information
- Base(s): House of Mystery; Dark Quarters
- Member(s): See below

Justice League Dark, or JLD, is a superhero team appearing in American comic books published by DC Comics. The team made their debut in Justice League Dark #1 (September 2011). The team features some of the more supernatural characters in the DC Universe, handling mystical threats and situations deemed outside the scope of the traditional Justice League. Similarly to the Justice League title, the team features well-known characters such as John Constantine, Zatanna, Swamp Thing, Doctor Fate, and Wonder Woman while also bringing exposure to lesser-known supernatural characters. Two animated films were produced based on the team: Justice League Dark (2017) and Justice League Dark: Apokolips War (2020).

== Publication history ==
=== The New 52 ===
Justice League Dark was announced on May 31, 2011, as a First Wave title of The New 52. The title and team was created by Peter Milligan, with art by Mikel Janín. The title launched on September 28, 2011. The title brought several of DC Comics' occult and offbeat characters, something which had been a trait of sister imprint Vertigo, back into the main DC Universe following Vertigo's editorial change to publish purely new, creator-owned content.

The Search for Swamp Thing, a three part miniseries released between June and August 2011 which led up to The New 52 relaunch, and followed the events of the Brightest Day maxiseries, follows John Constantine's search for the resurrected Alec Holland as the new Swamp Thing, involving the cooperation of Batman, Zatanna, and Superman. In addition, the Flashpoint: Secret Seven miniseries, written by Milligan as part of the "Flashpoint" crossover story line, included the Enchantress and Shade, the Changing Man and introduced the character Mindwarp in the lead-up to the start of the series.

Peter Milligan stated in an interview that he got the job for the book from his work on the 2011 Flashpoint: Secret Seven miniseries, and that he hoped to write something "emotionally dark" set in the DC Universe, comparing his characters to detectives, who struggle to cope with the things they see and have to do. The initial anticipation for this title has been good, with critics celebrating the fact that DC was willing to bring back some of the darker elements which had moved over to Vertigo in the 1990s.

The opening story line involves the Enchantress' defeat of the Justice League, leading to the necessity of a more supernatural team to assist in these events, and detailing how they have come together. There is also a minor crossover story with I...Vampire. From issue #9, Jeff Lemire became the principal writer on the series. In his first story arc, Justice League Dark took residence in their new base, at the House of Mystery, and have started to show their links with the wider DC Universe, dealing with Steve Trevor and A.R.G.U.S.

In August 2013, it was announced that J. M. DeMatteis would take over as series writer from Lemire in November 2013, after a solo issue by Ray Fawkes in October. The series ended publication in March 2015.

=== New Justice (2018–2021) ===
In March 2018, a new volume of Justice League Dark was announced. Spinning out of the "Justice League: No Justice" story line, the title debuted in July 2018, written by James Tynion IV and drawn by Alvaro Martinez, Raul Fernandez, and Brad Anderson. The team features Zatanna, Swamp Thing, Man-Bat, and Detective Chimp, and is led by Wonder Woman. Additional magical characters from the DC Universe appeared in the series, like John Constantine and Doctor Fate, although initially not as members of the League.

=== Infinite Frontier (2021–2023) ===
The second volume ran regularly for 29 issues from July 2018 to February 2021. The team would continue to appear as a back-up feature in the mainline Justice League series from issue #59 in May 2021 to issue #71 in March 2022 with guest appearances throughout issues #72 to 74.

=== Dawn of DC (2023–2024) ===
In the 2023 storyline Knight Terrors, the team members fall victim to the spells of Insomnia, becoming trapped within his Knightmare Realm. Remaining awake through the chaos, Zatanna and Robotman team up to defend the unconscious Detective Chimp against Insomnia's Sleepless Knights and the Sleeping Queen. The third volume of the Justice Society of America included supporting appearances from the Justice League Dark, with Deadman and Madame Xanadu returning to the team. The series also introduces a predecessor to the Justice League Dark known as the Justice Society Dark, consisting of Zatara and Thaddeus Brown.

== Collected editions ==
=== New 52 (2011–2016) ===
Title	Page count	Material collected	Publication date	ISBN	Ref
Justice League Dark Vol. 1: In the Dark	144	Justice League Dark (vol. 1) #1–6	October 10th, 2012	978-1401237042	
Justice League Dark Vol. 2: The Books of Magic	224	Justice League Dark (vol. 1) #0, 7–13	July 10th, 2013	978-1401240240	
Justice League Dark Vol. 3: The Death of Magic	192	Justice League Dark (vol. 1) #14–21	January 29th, 2014	978-1401242459	
Justice League Dark Vol. 4: The Rebirth of Evil	208	Justice League Dark (vol. 1) #22–29	August 20th, 2014	978-1401247256	
Forever Evil: Blight	400	Justice League Dark (vol. 1) #24–29; Constantine #9–12; Trinity of Sin: Pandora #6–9; Trinity of Sin: Phantom Stranger #14–17	September 24, 2014	978-1401250065	
Justice League Dark Vol. 5: Paradise Lost	160	Justice League Dark (vol. 1) #30–34; Justice League Dark: Futures End #1	February 25th, 2015	978-1401250072	
Justice League Dark Vol. 6: Lost in Forever	176	Justice League Dark (vol. 1) #35–40; Justice League Dark Annual #2	August 26th, 2015	978-1401254810	
Justice League Dark: The New 52 Omnibus	1624	Justice League Dark (vol. 1) #0–40; Justice League Dark Annual #1–2; Justice League Dark: Futures End #1; Constantine #5, #9–12; I, Vampire #7–8; Justice League #22–23; Justice League of America #6–7; The New 52: Free Comic Book Day Special Edition #1; Trinity of Sin: Pandora #1–3, #6–9; Trinity of Sin: Phantom Stranger #11, #14–17;	November 9, 2021	978-1779513137	

=== DC Rebirth (2016–2017) ===
Title	Page count	Material collected	Publication date	ISBN	Ref
Wonder Woman and Justice League Dark: The Witching Hour	160	Wonder Woman (vol. 5) #56–57; Wonder Woman/Justice League Dark: The Witching Hour #1; Justice League Dark (vol. 2) #4; Justice League Dark/Wonder Woman: The Witching Hour #1	May 1st, 2019	978-1401290733	

=== New Justice (2018–2021) ===
Title	Page count	Material collected	Publication date	ISBN	Ref
Justice League Dark Vol. 1: The Last Age of Magic	160	Justice League Dark (vol. 2) #1–3, 5–6	March 6th, 2019	978-1401288112	
Justice League Dark Vol. 2: Lords of Order	184	Justice League Dark (vol. 2) #8–12; Justice League Dark Annual #1	October 16th, 2019	978-1401294601	
Justice League Dark Vol. 3: The Witching War	144	Justice League Dark (vol. 2) #14–19	May 12th, 2020	978-1779500342	
Justice League Dark Vol. 4: A Costly Trick of Magic	216	Justice League Dark (vol. 2) #20–28	January 26th, 2021	978-1779507143	
Future State: Justice League	296	Future State: Justice League #1–2; Future State: Justice League Dark #1–2; Future State: Aquaman #1–2; Future State: Green Lantern #1–2; Future State: The Flash #1–2	June 22nd, 2021	978-1779510655	
Justice League: Endless Winter	232	Justice League: Endless Winter #1–2; The Flash #767; Superman: Endless Winter Special #1; Aquaman #66; Justice League #58; Teen Titans: Endless Winter Special #1; Justice League Dark #29; Black Adam: Endless Winter Special #1	November 16th, 2021	978-1779511539	
Justice League Dark: The Great Wickedness	184	Justice League Dark 2021 Annual #1; material from Justice League (vol. 4) #59–71	July 19th, 2022	978-1779515513	

== Overview ==
=== Headquarters ===
In the original run by Peter Milligan, the Justice League Dark team first operated out of the House of Mystery, first owned by John Constantine. Due to the nature of the house and his manipulations, the team could be called at any time by Constantine until its acquisition by Zatanna. In the second series onward, the team's headquarters is changed to the Dark Quarters, located half a mile underneath the Hall of Justice and built upon Wonder Woman's request of spearheading an official division of the Justice League dedicated to dealing with mystical threats.

=== Members ===
Typically consisting of supernatural-related heroes of the DC Universe, the team's original creative direction involved minimal contact with the mainstream Justice League, operating in secrecy. First organized by Madame Xanadu to prevent a horrific future, the first iteration's reoccurring conflict involved various rivalries and problems concerning team dynamics, especially those stemmed from Constantine's leadership including coercion and manipulation. In the second iteration founded by Wonder Woman, the team is cast as an official Justice League-sponsored subgroup dedicated to handling mystical matters. Among its re-occurring conflict includes Wonder Woman's navigating the difficulties of mystical matters, Zatanna's reluctance in a leadership role, and the team's relationship with the reluctant mystical community of the DC Universe.

Character	Joined in	Description
Team leads and chairmen
**John Constantine**	Justice League Dark (2011) #1	A working class Liverpudlian magician whom is a founding member of the first formation and former team leader after issue #9 of the first series due to manipulative tactics. Acts in an advisory capacity following the second formation as an on-and-off consultant in the second series and its backup.
Madame Xanadu	Justice League Dark (2011) #1	A mystic and fortune teller who is a founding member and organizer of the first formation of the team. Xanadu is a reoccurring member and while appearing as an official team member in the first series, she occasionally appears in the second series.
**Wonder Woman**	Justice League Dark (2018) #1	The daughter of legendary warrior-queen Hippolyta and trained demigoddess Amazon, she is the founding member of the second formation and its chairman until her supposed death following Dark Nights: Death Metal. She later returns to the team following the Justice League Unlimited initiative.
**Zatanna Zatara**	Justice League Dark (2011) #2	A stage magician and genuine sorceress whom is a founding member of the first formation of the team and takes lead after ousting Constantine from the role in issue #30 of the first series. In the second series, she joins Wonder Woman's formation in issue #2 and is later promoted as the current chairman in the backup JLD feature in the mainline Justice League book. Among the team, she is among the most powerful of magic users.
Major and reoccurring members
Deadman	Justice League Dark (2011) #1	The ghost of an assassinated acrobat who can possess the bodies of the living. A re-occurring member, Deadman appears as a member of the roster of the first formation and is featured in the second formation, albeit as an auxiliary member.
**Detective Chimp**	Justice League Dark (2018) #2	An intelligent chimpanzee with a genius-level intellect, the ability to talk, and was gifted the Sword of the Night, making him both the Nightmaster and owner of neutral dimension Oblivion Bar. Serving as the team's resident detective, he joins the second formation of the team and is a confidante of both Wonder Woman and Doctor Fate.
**Doctor Fate (Khalid Nassour)**	Justice League Dark (2018) #13	The current incarnation of Earth's mystic defender, he first joined without use of the moniker as a consultant alongside Kent as his apprentice and assistant. He later elevated as an important member in issue #18 of the second series, corresponding with his succession of Kent as Doctor Fate and further legitimizing the team with a renowned sorcerer to the supernatural community.
Swamp Thing (Alec Holland)	Justice League Dark (2011) #19	A plant elemental manifesting as a swamp monster and a protector of nature, Swamp Thing joins the team in its first formation and later in the second formation within issue #2 of the second series. Within the team, he is considered a powerhouse and among the most powerful in the team. He is killed off and while resurrected in outside books, he is replaced by Levi Kamei.
Newer members, consultants, temporary, former, and other members
Amethyst, Princess of Gemworld	Justice League Dark Annual #1	A princess from the world of Nilaa. She is summoned to Earth in an effort to reconnect Tim Hunter with magic in Justice League Dark Annual #1 for the first formation of the team. Last seen with the team in issue #14. Afterwards, she returned to Nilaa. After DC Rebirth, this version of the characters' history is altered to fit her prior origin, making her standing in the team unknown.
Black Orchid (Alba Garcia)	Justice League Dark (2011) #9	A new shapeshifting version of Black Orchid and A.R.G.U.S. agent who worked under Col. Steve Trevor in the first formation. Joined in issue #9. leaves the team in issue #30.
Doctor Mist	Justice League Dark (2011) #9	Immortal sorcerer and founder of African empire, Kor. In modern times, he was a A.R.G.U.S. supernatural expert and consultant tasked with watching Constantine within the first formation but is revealed to be a spy coerced by Felix Faust before trying to redeem himself. Joined in issue #9 and left the team after it was revealed he was working for Faust in issue #11 of the first series.
Eternal Knight	Justice League #69 (2021)	Dark-skinned immortal knight and former member of the Knights of the Round Table tasked with guarding Excalibur. Betrayed by a Merlin secretly manipulated towards evil by Yuga Khan, she is eventually recruited by Doctor Fate (Khalid Nassour) to assist in fighting Merlin, granted Nth metal weaponry by Batman. She is an original character created in the storyline in the JLD backup.
**Etrigan / Jason Blood**	Justice League #60 (2021)	A powerful demon from Hell and skilled sorcerer whom was apprenticed under Merlin. Sharing a body, the pair work as a supernatural duo battling dark threats. He is accepted into the team by Justice League members and chairman Zatanna in the JLD backup series to help battle Merlin.
Frankenstein's Monster	Justice League Dark (2011) #14	An erudite creature created by Viktor Frankenstein, Frankenstein first assists the first formation of the team in Justice League Dark Annual #1. He chooses to stay with the team in issue #14 of the first series but leaves in issue #30.
I, Vampire	Justice League Dark (2011) #9	A powerful and immortal vampire. He becomes becomes a member of the first formation as a favor to Constantine and is forcibly induced. Appearing in the first series, the team in issue #14, rejoined in issue #35. He is not present in the second formation.
Kent Nelson	Justice League Dark (2018) #13	The original Doctor Fate and Khalid Nassour's mentor. While invited to the team as a full member by Wonder Woman in its second formation, Neslon opts to operate as a consultant and "behind-the-scenes", rejecting the use of the Doctor Fate moniker. He later leaves the team in issue #24 of the second series with intents of retiring but is killed in action while helping the team battle Upside-Down Man.
Man-Bat	Justice League Dark (2011) #1	A gifted scientist whose formula while researching a cure to deafness causes him to turn into a bat-like hybrid or a giant bat while gaining an addiction to his serum. A former adversary of Batman, he is recruited by Wonder Woman for a chance of rehabilitation in the second formation. Some-time after freeing Khalid Nassour and his ascension as Doctor Fate, Langstrom acted as his assistant and partner.
Mary Marvel	Wonder Woman (2023-) #11	A heroine and contemporary of Shazam whom was first empowered by her foster brother before ultimately being patroned by six Greek goddesses. She joins the team prior to the events of Absolute Power.
Mindwarp	Justice League Dark (2011) #3	A supernatural being recruited by Madame Xanadu introduced in issue #3 and left in issue #5. He is killed in Trinity of Sin: The Phantom Stranger #15 by Felix Faust and Nick Necro during testing of Project Thaumaton.
Nightmare Nurse	Trinity of Sin: The Phantom Stranger #9	A demonic healer capable of healing even the most grievous mystical or supernatural wounds and with a past history with Constantine. She is recruited to the team to help fight Blight during "Forever Evil".
Randhir Singh	Justice League Dark 2021 Annual #1 (2021)	A South Asian psychic and long-time friend of Jason Blood with experience of the supernatural. Imprisoned during Merlin's campaign to control magic on Earth, he joins forces with the JLD for a time.
**Ragman**	Justice League #61 (2021)	Jewish vigilante and book store own who bears the Suit of Souls, a magical rag suit capable of absorbing the souls of evil people, appropriating their skills, and grants supernatural powers. Joins the second team formation to help Zatanna and the team in the battle Merlin.
Raven	Dark Crisis: The Deadly Green #1	A half-demon sorceress and heroic daughter of cosmic demon, Trigon. Following the supposed deaths of founders Zatanna and Wonder Woman, she is recruited by John Constantine and Doctor Fate to help stop the Great Darkness and is a part-time member following Justice League Unlimited initiative although she acts mainly as a member of the Titans.
Shade, the Changing Man	Justice League Dark (2011) #1	A hero with the power to warp reality. He is tasked with bringing the team together at the behest of Madame Xanadu. Shade leaves the team in issue #8 after losing control of the M-Vest.
Shazam	Wonder Woman (2023-) #11	A teenaged hero empowered by a magical wizard to transform into an adult with powers derived from gods and a Champion of Magic. He joins the team prior to the events of Absolute Power.
**Swamp Thing (Levi Kamei)**	Dark Crisis on Infinite Earths #4 (2022)	The South Asian successor of Alec Holland as the Swamp Thing and elemental guardian of nature. A gifted scientist with expansive knowledge of botany and chemistry, he joins the team to help JLD stop the Great Darkness. He is a present member following the creation of the Justice League Unlimited initiative.
Timothy Hunter	Justice League Dark #11 (September, 2012)	A boy-sorcerer destined to unlock the Books of Magic, he is brought into JLD under protection in the first formation.
Note: **Bold** indicate current member status. "Major and re-occurring" denotes characters whom appeared in at least two of the Justice League Dark titles.

=== Enemies ===
Character	First appearance
Anton Arcane	Swamp Thing #2 (January 1973)
Arion (Sapphire Knight)	Warlord #55 (March,1982)
Blight	Justice League Dark #24 (December, 2013)
Cain	The House of Mystery #175 (July–August 1968)
Doctor Destiny	Justice League of America #5 (June 1961).
Drakul Karfang	JLA: A League of One (January, 2001)
Eclipso	House of Secrets #61 (1963)
Enchantress	Strange Adventures #187 (April 1966)
Felix Faust	Justice League of America #10 (1962)
Hecate	Wonder Woman Vol 4 #37 (February, 2015)
Merlin	New Comics #3 (February, 1936)
Mordru	Adventure Comics #369 (June 1968)
Nick Necro	Justice League Dark #12 (2012)
Nabu	More Fun Comics #67 (1940)
Upside-Down Man	Justice League Dark #1 (September, 2018)
Xanadoth	Superman #23 (September, 2020)
Zonzu / Yuga Khan	New Gods Vol #17 (June, 1990)

==== Team-related adversaries ====
**Injustice League Dark**
Circe	Wonder Woman #37 (September/October 1949)
Floronic Man	The Flash #245 (November 1976)
Klarion the Witch Boy & Teekl	The Demon #7 (March 1973)
Papa Midnite	Hellblazer #1
Solomon Grundy	All-American Comics #61
**Lords of Order (Nabu's group)**
Brother Pattern (Hoku)	Justice League Dark #8 (April, 2019)
Count Control (Dalphi)	Justice League Dark #8 (April, 2019)
Lord Structure (Myrath)	Justice League Dark #8 (April, 2019)
Sister Symmetry (Cyra)	Justice League Dark #8 (April, 2019)

== Other versions ==
- An alternate universe incarnation of Justice League Dark appears in The New 52: Futures End, consisting of Zatanna, Etrigan, Cassandra Craft, Black Orchid, the Nightmare Nurse, Madame Xanadu, Frankenstein, John Constantine, Amethyst, Blue Devil, Deadman, and Andrew Bennett.
- The Secret Seven, a team similar to Justice League Dark, appears in Flashpoint, consisting of Shade the Changing Man, Abra Kadabra, Amethyst, the Enchantress, Mindwarp, Raven, Zatanna, Black Orchid, Klarion the Witch Boy, Miss X, Simon Magus, Stiletto, and Trigon.
- An alternate universe incarnation of Justice League Dark appears in DC Comics Bombshells, consisting of Zatanna, John Constantine, Raven, the Enchantress, Killer Croc, and Ravager.
- An alternate universe incarnation of Justice League Dark appears in Superman/Batman, consisting of Batman, the Scream Queen, Traci Thirteen, Klarion, Stanley and His Monster; Aquaman, and Etrigan.
- The League of Shadows, a group from Earth-13 inspired by Justice League Dark, appears in The Multiversity, consisting of Etrigan, Annataz, Deadman, the Enchantress, Fate, the Hellblazer, the Ragman, the Swamp-Man, and the Witchboy.
- The League of Shamans, a group from Earth-33, appears in Countdown to Adventure, consisting of Bat-Mage, Super-Mage, Green Lantern, the Black Bird, Terra, Lady Flash, the Shade, and Kara Zor-El.
- An alternate timeline incarnation of Justice League Dark appears in Future State, consisting of John Constantine, Zatanna, Madame Xanadu, Doctor Fate (Khalid Nassour), and Detective Chimp, the last becoming Etrigan's host after Merlin separated him from Jason Blood.

== In other media ==
=== Television ===
- Justice League Dark was scheduled to appear in an episode of Constantine prior to its cancellation.
- Justice League Dark was planned to appear in Swamp Thing and star in a spin-off series prior to the former's cancellation.
- In January 2020, Warner Media and Bad Robot were working to create a Justice League Dark universe in film and television. In April 2020, a television series centered on the Justice League Dark characters was moving forward for HBO Max, with J. J. Abrams and Ben Stephenson serving as executive producers. It was no longer moving forward by February 2023.

=== Film ===
==== Animated ====
Justice League Dark appear in films set in the DC Animated Movie Universe, consisting of Zatanna, Deadman, Etrigan the Demon, and Black Orchid.

==== Live action ====
Rumors in November 2012 suggested that Guillermo del Toro was working on a Justice League Dark film titled Heaven Sent. It would feature Deadman, the Spectre, the Swamp Thing, John Constantine, the Phantom Stranger, Zatanna, Zatara, Sargon the Sorcerer, and Etrigan. Del Toro later confirmed in January 2013 that he was working on such a film, with the working title, Dark Universe, and was hiring a screenwriter. Del Toro revealed the Swamp Thing, Constantine, the Spectre, Deadman, Zatanna and Zatara were characters in the story.

In March 2013, del Toro gave an update on the film at WonderCon 2013, while talking about his film Pacific Rim. He revealed that the story bible was complete and he hoped to start the screenplay soon. Production would begin after his next project, Crimson Peak. The film's story would center around John Constantine recruiting the Swamp Thing, Etrigan, Deadman, the Spectre, and Zatanna. The film would not be an origin story, with each character already established and elements of their backstory coming into play throughout the film. Del Toro also revealed that the Floronic Man would be in the film. In May 2013, del Toro revealed that his script featured Constantine, the Swamp Thing, Madame Xanadu, Deadman and Zatanna as the team, with others "in the mix". He also revealed that he was still waiting for the go-ahead from Warner Bros. Pictures. Del Toro revealed in July 2013 that he hoped that the DC Extended Universe, which started with Man of Steel, would become as cohesive as the Marvel Cinematic Universe, and he added that if there was any correlation to that universe and this film, he would honor it.

In October 2013, del Toro stated he felt his film would be able to coexist with the television series Constantine and reiterated that the film was still active and in the writing process. In July 2014, del Toro once again stated he was working on the film, and stated it would be independent from the universe established with Man of Steel, saying, "DC and Warners have been very clear that they are trying to keep [this film and Sandman] separate so when the time comes they can unite them, once they know they’re quantifiable." Del Toro also added that his Constantine would not adhere to the continuity established in the television series, but he would consider incorporating elements from it, and even think about casting the same actor (Matt Ryan). In November 2014, del Toro confirmed that the script was complete and handed it in to Warner Bros. to be reviewed. In December 2014, he hinted that the film would be part of the DC Extended Universe.

In April 2015, del Toro said the script revision has been handed in and if there was availability in his schedule, he would direct it; if not, "somebody else will do it... [The film] needs to fall into the plan of the shared universe." In June 2015, the film was confirmed to still be in development at Warner Bros., with some of their other Vertigo Comics film adaptions moving to New Line Cinema. The Hollywood Reporter stated that del Toro was no longer attached to the project. In July 2016, Swamp Thing test footage was released directed by Joseph Kahn. In August 2016, it was announced that Doug Liman would direct the film with del Toro and Scott Rudin producing and Michael Gilio writing, with the film being titled Dark Universe. By May 2017, Liman left the film to focus on directing Chaos Walking. At San Diego Comic-Con in July 2017, the film's title was announced to be Justice League Dark. In January 2020, Deadline reported that WarnerMedia and Bad Robot are working to create a Justice League Dark universe in film and TV. The initiative has stalled by 2023.

=== Video games ===
- Justice League Dark appears in Raiden's ending for Injustice 2, consisting of Raiden, the Swamp Thing, Zatanna, John Constantine, Etrigan the Demon, and Deadman.
- Justice League Dark appears in a self-titled DLC pack for Lego DC Super-Villains, consisting of John Constantine, Zatanna, Etrigan, Deadman, the Swamp Thing, and the Spectre. Additionally, the Enchantress and Frankenstein are stated to be members as well.

== See also ==
- Justice League of Apostles
- Sentinels of Magic
- Shadowpact
- The Trenchcoat Brigade
- Injustice League Dark
