= Yanick Paquette =

Canadian comic book artist

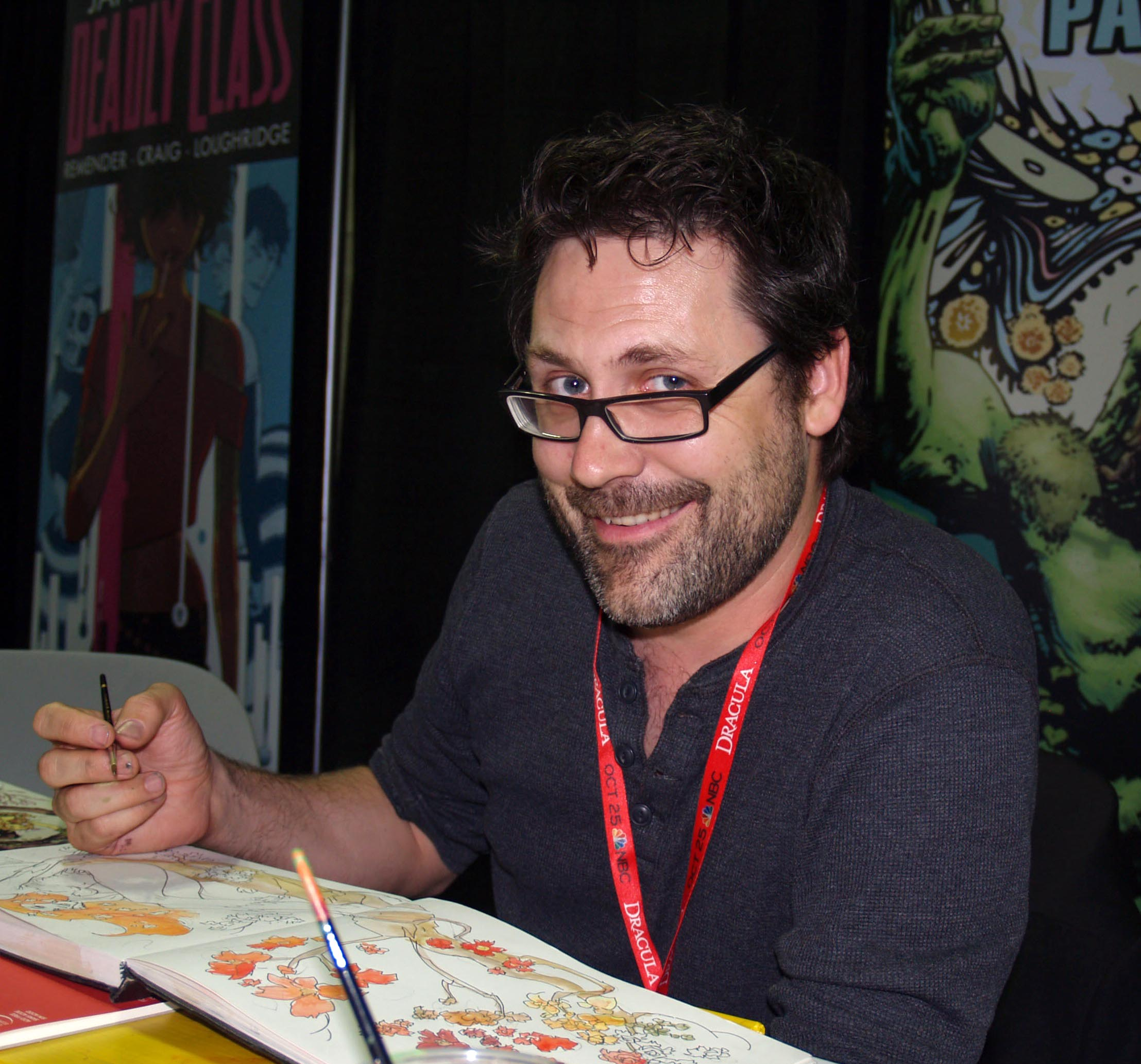
- Paquette sketching at the 2013; New York Comic Con in Manhattan
- Areas: Penciller, Artist, Inker
- Notable works: Seven Soldiers: Bulleteer; Batman Incorporated; Swamp Thing; Wonder Woman: Earth One

Yanick Paquette is a Canadian comic book artist. He has worked for Antarctic Press, Topps, Marvel, and DC Comics and since 1994.

== Career ==
In 1996, Paquette drew two miniseries adapted from the TV series Space: Above and Beyond, written by Roy Thomas, for Topps Comics. The following year he and Thomas reunited to draw Xena: Warrior Princess for Topps.

In 1997, Paquette drew two issues of JLA Secret Files, his first work on the Justice League of America. He would return to those characters in 1998 with JLA: Tomorrow Woman and "Madmen and Mudbaths", one of the stories in the 1999 anthology book JLA 80-Page Giant #2. From 1998 to 1999, Paquette drew nine issues of Wonder Woman for DC Comics.

Clément Sauvé was his assistant on background on a wide number of issues from 2000 to 2002. From 2000 to 2001, Yanick drew ten issues of Gambit.

Paquette was the regular artist on Ultimate X-Men from February 2007 to January 2008, and for the first five issues of Young X-Men in 2008.

He drew first five issues of Young X-Men in 2008. He later supplied the art for Batman: The Return of Bruce Wayne #3 (August 2010), and launched Batman Incorporated, which was written by Grant Morrison.

== Awards and nominations ==
Year	Award	Category	Work	Result	Ref.
2019	Shuster Award	Outstanding Artist	Wonder Woman: Earth One Vol. 2	Nominated	
2019	Eisner Award	Best Penciller/Inker or Penciller/Inker Team	Wonder Woman: Earth One Vol. 2	Nominated	
2017	Shuster Award	Outstanding Artist	Batman #49-50, Nightwing Rebirth #1, Wonder Woman: Earth One Vol. 2	Won	
2017	Shuster Award	Outstanding Cover Artist	JLA, Wonder Woman: Earth One	Nominated	
2013	Shuster Award	Outstanding Artist	Swamp Thing	Nominated	
2013	Shuster Award	Outstanding Cover Artist	Swamp Thing	Nominated	

== Bibliography ==
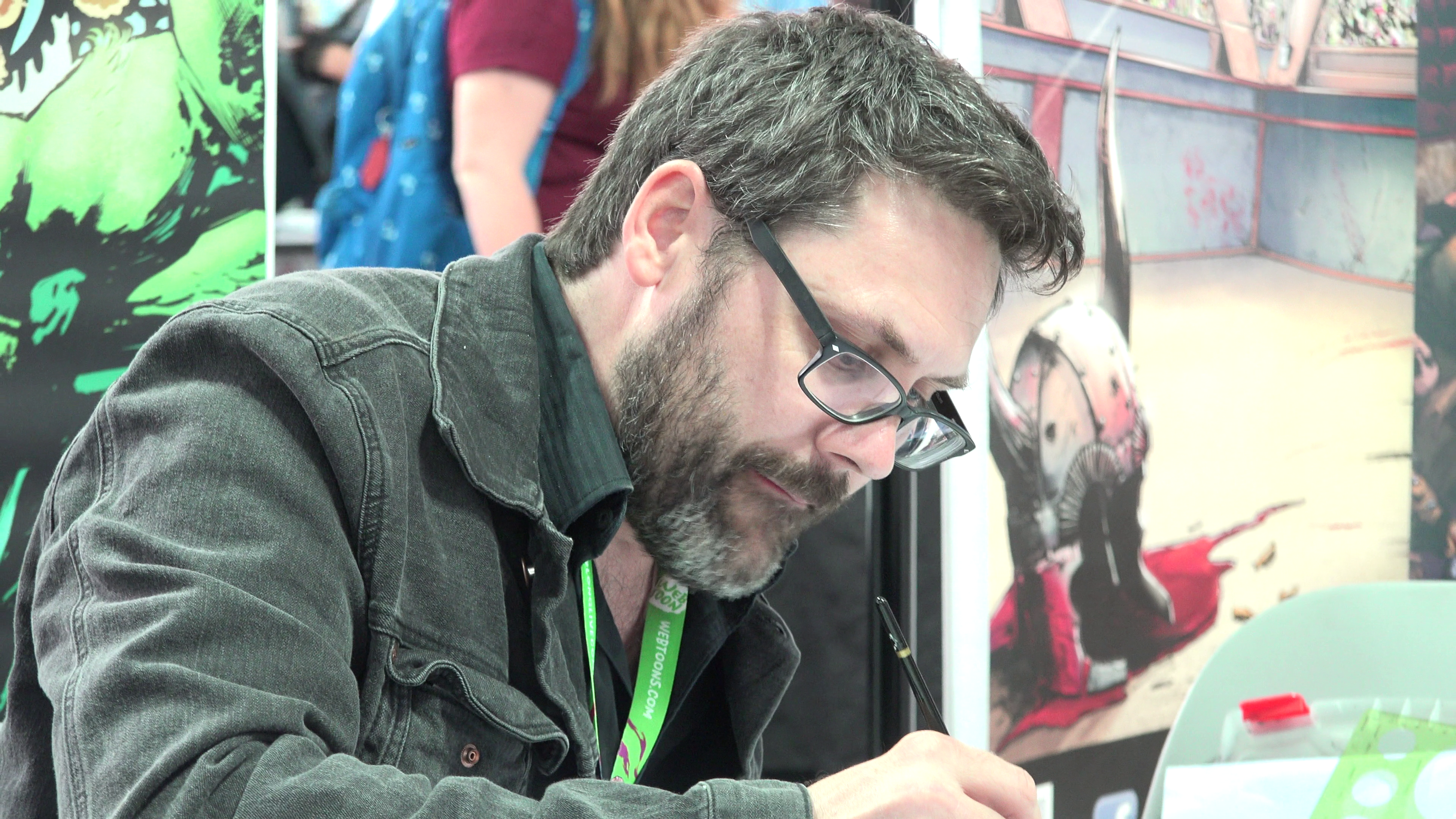
Yanick Paquette in Artists' Alley at New York Comic Con 2015

=== Interior work ===
- Blood Childe: Portrait of a Surreal Killer #3–4 (with Faye Perozich, Millennium Publications, 1995)
- Space: Above and Beyond (with Roy Thomas, Topps):
  - Space: Above and Beyond #1–3 (1996)
  - Space: Above and Beyond: Gauntlet #1–2 (1996)
- Xena: Warrior Princess: Year One (with Roy Thomas, Topps, 1997)
- Warrior Nun Areala #4–5: "Holy Man, Holy Terror" (with Barry Lyga, Antarctic Press, 1998)
- JLA: Tomorrow Woman: "Tomorrow Never Knows" (with Tom Peyer, DC Comics, 1998)
- JLA Secret Files #2: "Heroes" (with Christopher Priest, DC Comics, 1998)
- Wonder Woman #139–144, 146–148 (with Eric Luke, DC Comics, 1998–1999)
- Eros Graphic Albums #39: "Harem Nights" (script and art, with Michel Lacombe, Eros Comix, 1999)
- Day of Judgement Secret Files #1: "Which Witch?" (with Mark Millar, DC Comics, 1999)
- JLA 80-Page Giant #2: "Madmen and Mudbaths" (with Jason Hernandez-Rosenblatt, DC Comics, 1999)
- Adventures of Superman (DC Comics):
  - "A Night at the Opera" (with Mark Millar and Stuart Immonen, in #575, 2000)
  - "A Tale of Two Cities" (with Jay Faerber and Stuart Immonen, in #577, 2000)
- Gambit #15–19, 21–24 (with Fabian Nicieza, Marvel, 2000–2001)
- Superman: The Man of Steel #112: "Krypto!" (with Mark Schultz and Olivier Coipel, DC Comics, 2001)
- Superman: Our Worlds at War Secret Files #1: "Resources" (with Dan Curtis Johnson and J. H. Williams III, DC Comics, 2001)
- Codename: Knockout #4, 7–8, 10–12 (with Robert Rodi, Vertigo, 2001–2002)
- Gen^{13} #68–69: "Failed Universe" (with Adam Warren, Wildstorm, 2001)
- 9-11 Volume 2: "9 a.m. EST" (with Dan Abnett and Andy Lanning, DC Comics, 2002)
- Avengers #56: "Lo, There Shall Come... an Accounting!" (with Kurt Busiek, Marvel, 2002)
- Negation #11: "Baptism of Fire" (with Tony Bedard, CrossGen, 2002)
- Terra Obscura (with Alan Moore and Peter Hogan, America's Best Comics):
  - Volume 1 #1–6 (2003–2004)
  - Volume 2 #1–6 (2004–2005)
- Seven Soldiers: Bulleteer #1–4 (with Grant Morrison, DC Comics, 2006)
- Civil War: X-Men #1–4 (with David Hine, Marvel, 2006)
- Ultimate X-Men #77, 79–80, 84–88 (with Robert Kirkman, Marvel, 2007–2008)
- Young X-Men #1–5 (with Marc Guggenheim, Marvel, 2008)
- X-Men: Manifest Destiny #3: "Abomination" (with Marc Guggenheim, Marvel, 2009)
- Wolverine: Origins #31–32: "The Family Business" (with Daniel Way, Marvel, 2009)
- Uncanny X-Men #512: "The Origins of the Species" (with Matt Fraction, Marvel, 2009)
- The Amazing Spider-Man #605: "Red-Headed Stranger: Epilogue — Chapter Three: Match.con" (with Brian Reed, Marvel, 2009)
- Wolverine: Weapon X #6–9: "Insane in the Brain" (with Jason Aaron, Marvel, 2009–2010)
- X-Men: Legacy #234: "The Telltale Heart" (with Mike Carey, Marvel, 2010)
- Batman: The Return of Bruce Wayne #3: "The Bones of Bristol Bay" (with Grant Morrison, DC Comics, 2010)
- Batman Incorporated v1 #1–3, 5 (with Grant Morrison, DC Comics, 2010–2011)
- Swamp Thing #1–3, 5, 7–9 13–14, 16, 18(with Scott Snyder and Marco Rudy, DC Comics, 2011–2013)
- Batman vol. 2 #49–50 (with Scott Snyder, DC Comics, 2016)
- Nightwing: Rebirth #1 (with Tim Seeley, DC Comics, 2016)
- Wonder Woman: Earth One Vol. 1 (with Grant Morrison, DC Comics, 2016)
- Wonder Woman: Earth One Vol. 2 (with Grant Morrison, DC Comics, 2018)
- Action Comics #1003 (with Brian Michael Bendis, DC Comics, 2018)
- Batman vol. 3 #69 (with Tom King, DC Comics, 2019)
- Superman: Leviathan Rising Special #1 (with Brian Michael Bendis, DC Comics, 2019)
- Wonder Woman: Earth One Vol. 3 (with Grant Morrison, DC Comics, 2021)
- The Incal: Psychoverse (with Mark Russell and Dave McCaig, Humanoids, 2022)

=== Cover work ===
- Gambit #20 (Marvel, 2000)
- Marvel Comics Presents #10 (Marvel, 2008)
- Ultimate X-Men #81–83, 89 (Marvel, 2008)
- Marvel Spotlight: Dark Reign (Marvel, 2009)
- Uncanny X-Men Annual #2 (Marvel, 2009)
- New Mutants #3 (Marvel, 2009)
- Dark X-Men: The Confession (Marvel, 2009)
- Age of Heroes #3 (Marvel, 2010)
- Dark Wolverine #90 (Marvel, 2010)
- Knight and Squire #1–6 (DC Comics, 2010–2011)
- Superman v1 #705 (DC Comics, 2011)
- Batman Incorporated v1 #1–5 (DC Comics, 2011)
- Swamp Thing #1–18 (DC Comics, 2012)
