= Demon Knights =

DC Comics series

- Front cover of Demon Knights #1 (September 2011).

Publication information
- Publisher: DC Comics
- Publication date: September 2011 - August 2013
- Main characters: Etrigan; Madame Xanadu; Vandal Savage; Shining Knight; The Horsewoman; Al Jabr; Exoristos

Creative team
- Written by: Paul Cornell; Robert Venditti
- Artists: Diogenes Neves; Michael Choi; Robson Rocha; Benard Chang; Chad Hardin; Phil Winslade

Demon Knights is a DC Comics title launched in 2011 as part of that company's line-wide title relaunch, The New 52. It is a team title featuring Etrigan, Madame Xanadu, Shining Knight and others. Its main difference to other team titles, such as the Justice League, is that this team is based in the Medieval period of the DC Universe history. Its initial writer is Paul Cornell, with art by Diogenes Neves.

== Publication history ==
In the planning stages of The New 52, Paul Cornell was asked to write an Etrigan title. At his request this became a team title set in medieval times as this was of more interest to him, and a more fitting period for Etrigan to operate. Cornell also stated that a love of the film The Magnificent Seven is an influence on the title, and that it is a team title as he is more interested in the interactions between characters, rather than any scene or period. It has been confirmed that this team is the ancestral version of Stormwatch.

== Characters ==
- Etrigan - A demon who Merlin bonded to human sorcerer Jason Blood. The character was originally created by Jack Kirby.
- Lucifer - A fallen angel and ruler of Hell.
- Madame Xanadu - A powerful magician with ties to Merlin.
- Vandal Savage - An immortal man, and regular villain in the DC Universe.
- Shining Knight - a knight called Sir Ystin, from fallen Camelot.
- The Horsewoman - a mysterious woman never seen off her horse.
- Al Jabr - a Middle Eastern fighter and tactician, with a good knowledge of mathematics.
- Exoristos - a strange woman with ties to the Amazons.

== Plot ==
Jason Blood and Madame Xanadu arrive in the town of Little Spring and encounter Vandal Savage, Sir Ystin, Al Jabr, and Exoristos. Outside the town, a horde led by the Questing Queen and Mordru is heading towards the town. To save Little Spring from an oncoming fireball, Xanadu creates a magical barrier that seals it until sunrise. The Horsewoman gets through the barrier and heads to warn Alba Sarum and bring reinforcements. As the heroes and villagers prepare for the battle to come, Sir Ystin receives a vision from Merlin. He reveals to Ystin the source of his immortality and his yearning to seek the holy grail. Merlin also explains that Camelot itself is a city which is reincarnated over the centuries, meaning to be the best of humanity but always falling before its time. Vandal defects to the Queen, escaping Little Spring through an underground passage, and is made general for her forces. Finally day breaks, and Xanadu's barrier falls, leading the villains to massacre its residents. Vandal reveals his real intentions were to capture the horde's supply lines for himself but is discovered by the Queen. She opens fire on her own forces which causes routing and chaos. The forces of Alba Sarum arrive and force the Questing Queen to retreat but Little Spring and its people are devastated.

After the battle, the group is summoned by the Princesses Alba and Sarum. They have built their city in the hopes of creating a new Camelot and even had Merlin aiding them. Yet Merlin himself was mysteriously murdered and without his help, the princesses are unable to fulfill their promise of creating a new Camelot and will be unable to marry. Xanadu explains that the only means of resurrecting Merlin is to retrieve his soul from Avalon. The princesses give them a ship and weapons to travel to Britain and find a way into Avalon. Meanwhile, Etrigan plans with his master, Lucifer, to take Avalon for themselves. After a battle with pirates while crossing the English Channel, the heroes arrive in Britain which has been recently plagued by ravenous animals. They track the source of the monsters to the abandoned ruins of Camelot. The only remaining structure is now a tower that emanates a green light. The heroes are then attacked by an undead incarnation of King Arthur as the light turns the Demon Knights into monsters. The undead Arthur leads them to a cave, where he returns them to normal and helps them attack the tower. As they enter, it is revealed that the dark magic around the ruins is the work of Morgaine le Fey. Morgaine captures Arthur and the Demon Knights and explains that she plans to use them to possess Merlin's body. After escaping, the heroes confront Morgaine, but she uses her magic to possess Arthur instead. With last of his strength, Arthur destroys the tower's center and brings it crumbling down. While Morgaine is stopped, the knights are unable to enter Avalon and Etrigan sends them to Hell.

In hell, the Demon Knights are tormented as Lucifer and Etrigan plan their next move. Exoristos is chained to the shores of Themyscira before being freed by Lucifer in exchange for bringing a black diamond to Earth. This leaves Jason Blood behind in the ruins of Camelot, and he prepares to enter Hell to save Xanadu until he is interrupted by the Questing Queen, who makes a deal with him to help rescue her. Meanwhile, Ystin escapes and rescues the Demon Knights while the Questing Queen and Lucifer plan to invade Avalon. A massive battle between the forces of Earth, Heaven, and Hell erupts as Arthur appears with his knights from across the ages. The Demon Knights are victorious, but disband after returning to Earth.

Thirty years later, Al Jabr reunites the Demon Knights to stop Cain, who is conquering Europe with his vampire army and plans to turn the warriors of Themyscira into an undead army. Though they manage to defeat Cain, Ystin is bitten and transformed into a vampire before being healed by the Holy Grail.

== Reception ==
The first issue was the 72nd best selling comic by units in September 2011. The series opened to positive reviews, with scores around 8 or 9 from IGN's comics section for the first few issues, with writer Erik Norris' entreating readers to read this title: "People, Demon Knights is awesome. Please join the bandwagon and give this fun book a shot if you haven't already. You won't regret it. A series like this needs all the support it can get to keep it from getting the axe". Popmatters compared Paul Cornell's retro-modern style to a DJ, mixing RZA and Miles Davis.

== Collected editions ==
- Demon Knights Vol. 1: Seven Against the Dark (collects Demon Knights #1-7)
- Demon Knights Vol. 2: The Avalon Trap (collects Demon Knights #8-12 and #0)
- Demon Knights Vol. 3: The Gathering Storm (collects Demon Knights #13-23)

== See also ==
- Etrigan the Demon
