= Manhattan Guardian =

The Manhattan Guardian
- The Manhattan Guardian by Cameron Stewart.

Publication information
- Publisher: DC Comics
- First appearance: Seven Soldiers: Guardian #1 (May 2005)
- Created by: Grant Morrison; Cameron Stewart

In-story information
- Alter ego: Jake Jordan
- Team affiliations: Seven Soldiers of Victory; Newsboy Army; Justice League
- Abilities: Skilled hand to hand combatant Excellent physical condition Carries a golden helmet and shield

The Manhattan Guardian (Jake Jordan) is a superhero appearing in media published by DC Comics. Created by Grant Morrison and Cameron Stewart and based on the character Guardian, he first appeared in Seven Soldiers: Guardian #1 (2005), part of the Seven Soldiers "megaseries".

== Publication history ==
The character originally appeared in the Manhattan Guardian mini-series. The inspiration came from the British newspaper The Guardian which gave Morrison the idea for a tabloid-sponsored superhero, translated to America.

The Manhattan Guardian series is set in "Cinderella City" (to separate it from the ugly sisters Metropolis and Gotham) which is New York City but with unrealised architectural projects including an idea for the Hotel Attraction proposed by Paul Laffoley, Hans Hollein's "Rolls-Royce Building" concept for 28 Liberty Street, Robert Moses' Mid-Manhattan Expressway and Frank Lloyd Wright's "Ellis Island Key". The original idea came from Paul Laffoley's suggestion to reference Antoni Gaudí's architecture for inspiration in rebuilding Ground Zero. Morrison said: "I want it to be a more exalted New York, where things that were dreamed of were finally brought into reality".

In 2009, Superman writer James Robinson expressed a desire to have Manhattan Guardian team up with the original Guardian at some point in the near future.

== Fictional character biography ==
Jake Jordan is an unemployed former police officer who left the force after killing a young boy who he mistakenly believed to have killed his partner. On the suggestion of his fiancee's father Larry, Jordan applies for a job at the Manhattan Guardian tabloid. After passing a series of trials, he is confronted by Guardian owner Ed Stargard, who has him become the superhero Manhattan Guardian. His codename is derived from the newspaper and the original Guardian.

Manhattan Guardian participates in a series of battles, with his fiancee Carla's father being killed during a battle with pirates. Jordawn confronts Stargard, intent on quitting his job, but finds that Stargard is an elderly man who never physically developed beyond babyhood. Stargard explains that he is a former member of the Newsboy Army. Shortly afterward, the Sheeda attack the Guardian building, intent on killing Stargard. Manhattan Guardian, Stargard, and his secretary set off to find Carla and fight the Sheeda. Manhattan Guardian manages to defeat the Sheeda and rescue Carla, reconciling with her.

Manhattan Guardian appears in the storyline Infinite Crisis as one of hundreds of combatants in the "Battle for Metropolis", protecting the city from the Secret Society of Super Villains. Manhattan Guardian is later seen attending the memorial service for Superboy, who was killed during the events of Infinite Crisis.

== Powers and abilities ==
The Manhattan Guardian has no superpowers but is a skilled hand-to-hand combatant in excellent physical condition, having been trained in the police force. Like the original Guardian, he wears a golden helmet and carries a golden shield as a weapon.

== Other versions ==
An alternate universe version of Manhattan Guardian from Earth-23 appears in The Multiversity and Action Comics as a member of the Justice League.
