= Madame Xanadu =

Fictional character in DC Comics

- Madame Xanadu as depicted in promotional art for Day of Vengeance #1 (June 2005). Art by Walt Simonson.

Publication information
- Publisher: DC Comics
- First appearance: Doorway to Nightmare #1 (February 1978)
- Created by: David Michelinie; Michael William Kaluta

In-story information
- Alter ego: Nimue Inwudu
- Species: Homo magi
- Place of origin: Earth
- Team affiliations: Sentinels of Magic; Demon Knights; Justice League Dark; Justice League
- Partnerships: Spectre
- Abilities: Precognition, sense and interpret magical forces: Occultism; Spell Casting; Eldritch Blasts; Elemental Control; Divination; Conjuration; Transmutation; Summoning; Binding; Atmokinesis; Photokinesis; Chronokinesis; Clairvoyance; Astral projection; Hypnotism; Telepathy; Telekinesis; Teleportation; Invulnerability; Levitation; Flight; Immortality

Madame Xanadu (Nimue Inwudu) is a fictional character published by DC Comics. The character is identified with Nimue, the sorceress from Arthurian mythology made popular by Sir Thomas Malory's Le Morte d'Arthur.

Jeryl Prescott portrays Xanadu in the television series Swamp Thing.

== Publication history ==
Madame Xanadu debuted in Doorway to Nightmare #1 (February 1978). The character was designed by cover artist Michael William Kaluta at the request of editor Joe Orlando, based on Kaluta's unnamed host character (later known as Charity in the pages of Starman) from the DC Comics mystery title Forbidden Tales of Dark Mansion (seen only on that title's indicia page) and the person of Cathy Ann Thiele. The original storyline was developed by writer David Michelinie.

Doorway to Nightmare #1

Doorway to Nightmare, introduced in 1978, was the last of the DC "Mystery" line of titles in the 1970s that became the forerunner of Vertigo. It did not have a consistent creative team - the intent was to create writer-artist pairings that had never occurred before, except for the cover art of Michael Kaluta. Madame Xanadu, the star of the series, was not a host but an active participant, albeit never the main character in her stories. The Phantom Stranger was criticized heavily in letter columns for taking a similar approach. The Doorway to Nightmare strip lasted for ten issues: five in its own series, four in The Unexpected issues #190, #192, #194 and #195, and one issue of Madame Xanadu, which was DC's second direct sales only comic. Madame Xanadu was the first DC Comics publication exclusive to the direct market but the second overall due to a Superboy Spectacular release a year earlier. As explained by Paul Levitz: "In a further effort to find new distribution, a Superboy Spectacular was produced for Random House's in-school book club program and offered to comic shops but not newsstands". The first issue of Madame Xanadu bore little difference from an issue of Doorway to Nightmare. There were several requests to reprint it in letter columns of The Spectre, but they were refused because that issue gave little background as to her character, although it did introduce Ishtar to the DC Universe, who dated Destruction.

Madame Xanadu was a regular supporting cast member in volumes 2 and 3 of The Spectre, those versions written by Doug Moench (31 issues, 1987–1989) and John Ostrander (62 issues, 1993–1998).

A Madame Xanadu ongoing series from Vertigo was announced at the 2007 San Diego Comic-Con and started in 2008. It was written by Matt Wagner, with art by Amy Reeder Hadley. The series also featured art stints by Kaluta, Joëlle Jones, Marley Zarcone, Laurenn McCubbin, Chrissie Zullo, Celia Calle, and Marian Churchland. The series was concluded after 29 issues, the final one dated January 2011. The series dealt with Madame Xanadu's early life from Arthurian times until the 1960s. Starting with issue #9, the book coincided with the events of the Golden Age DC Universe.

== Story structure ==
The Doorway to Nightmare stories were typically structured around a protagonist stumbling upon Madame Xanadu's shop (stated to be on "Christy Street" in the East Village) (changed to Greenwich Village in The Unexpected #192) and deciding to enter. She (usually) or he would tell a story of romance that was frustrated by an outside element. Xanadu, through a tarot reading, always determined this element to be of an occult nature, then sent the protagonist to do some task in which she would intervene with the use of her powers. Upon concluding the story, the occult element would wind up in a mason jar in her back room. In the first issue, she apparently became trapped in a burning building. The central couple returns to her shop for nostalgia's sake and discovers her to be quite alive. This was a hint at the extent of her powers. The primary variation in the stories was what the occult threat actually was, be it demonic forces, Asian mummies, vampires, incubi, or other supernatural threats. In one story, she fought Azazel, but he looked nothing like in The Sandman.

When the title was moved from its own series to a revamped, 68 page and ad-free version of The Unexpected (the stories were actually expanded from 17 to 22 pages with the move, part of the DC Implosion), she was shown to be friendly with Abel in the inside front covers, which may or may not have been in continuity. She never met Abel in an actual story until DC Special Series #21, when she and the Phantom Stranger arrive at the House of Mystery with Christmas presents.

== Fictional character biography ==
=== Origin ===
Madame Xanadu's origins were explored in the first few arcs of her Vertigo series. According to these stories, her full name was once Nimue Inwudu and she is the youngest sister of Morgana (to become Morgaine Le Fay) and Vivienne, the Lady of the Lake. The sisters are descendants of the Elder Folk, survivors of Atlantis who evolved into the race known as the Homo magi.

Xanadu is the same Nimue who casts an imprisoning spell on her former lover Merlin, blaming him for manipulating Camelot and the course of history for his own gain. Merlin has the last laugh, though, as he succeeds in stripping her magic away from her, forcing her to use potions to maintain her immortality. The mysterious Phantom Stranger influences her betrayal of Merlin and the two continue to meet throughout the centuries, sharing an ambivalent relationship. Shortly after this, either she or the Lady of the Lake (regardless, called "Nimue") bore a son to Kon-Sten-Tyne, an ancestor of John Constantine. The child was left with Kon-Sten-Tyne, who sacrificed the boy as a teenager to Eve.

Nimue wanders around the world for some time, becoming an advisor to many great rulers. She spends time in Kublai Khan's court at Xanadu, leading to her assumed name of "Madame Xanadu". While at the court, she came into contact with a mystical artifact, resulting in some of her magical powers returning to her. Again she meets the Phantom Stranger. It does not go as expected, for she learns the Stranger walks outside of the timestream. During the French Revolution, she attempts to advise Marie Antoinette. During this era, she is able to regain her immortality by besting Death in a card game. Other incidents in her long years of life include a doomed lesbian love affair during the Spanish Inquisition.

In the 1940s, she has a sexual relationship with John Zatara, who wishes to marry her, but she foresees his true love, and the later existence of his daughter, Zatanna, "a love with whom she could never compete". Despite this, she uses Zatara to trap and ensnare the Phantom Stranger, preventing him from witnessing, and affecting, the supernatural origins of the Spectre. This, in turn, prevents Madame Xanadu from interfering, despite having foreseen the potential menace the unchecked Spectre would have brought on Earth. It is revealed that Xanadu's later behavior stems from this earlier fault, her magic parlor being devised as a way to control the supernatural being, ultimately hoping to restrain and quell his rage.

Eventually, Xanadu decides that she wants to atone for her sins and begins operating the fortune-telling parlor out of "the Village". She, however, possesses limited real magic abilities of her own, but her mastery of the mystic arts has led her to manipulate various forces to gain great power. Having developed herself as an advisor, she now meets clientele plagued by supernatural problems. Although she can advise them, some force prevents her from directly interfering in solving their troubles. If one of her clients manages to conquer a supernatural force, she can contain that entity in jars within her fortune parlor to prevent it from causing any further trouble.

=== Later history ===
Madame Xanadu #1 (1981) cover, art by Michael Kaluta.

When the Spectre is destroyed by the Anti-Monitor, Xanadu performs a magic ritual that brings him back to existence. From that day forward she acts as the Spectre's spiritual advisor while he is bound to the soul of Jim Corrigan. At first, Xanadu tries to lead Corrigan astray to use the Spectre-Force for her own agendas. She is depicted in a nude love scene with the Spectre in the form of mist, although readers in the letters column did not find this clear and Xanadu's nudity gratuitous. Subsequent issues made clear that this was a romantic relationship, but no more nudity was used.

Over the course of their affiliation however, a strange form of friendship grows between Jim Corrigan and Madame Xanadu. Over time, she is instrumental in ensuring the safety of Corrigan's soul, stopping the various rampages of the Spectre, and ultimately shows up at Corrigan's funeral not as an advisor or enemy, but as his friend. She even sheds a tear as Corrigan's soul leaves the mortal plane to go to Heaven.

She is also consulted by the Suicide Squad about the increasing difficulty of dealing with Enchantress. She provides the Squad with a ring and necklace that can harm the Enchantress if she tries to use her powers against the ring-bearers' wishes.

Madame Xanadu also gives Timothy Hunter a reading, helping him along his path as an emerging sorcerer. She also confronts Tim's companion John Constantine, whom she believes stole a magic artifact called the Wind's Egg from her.

Although Xanadu, among others, has no great love for or trust in the Phantom Stranger, she is a member of the Sentinels of Magic, a loose group of mages and mystics that are called upon to thwart Asmodel's uprising in Hell. Nonetheless, she prefers to operate alone and is one of the few heroes who outright refuses to ally herself with the Stranger.

To gain more power, Xanadu bartered her soul to the demon Neron, who gave her three loyal demons named Bathopet, Maw and Atopeh to do her commands. At first, the demons responded to her every whim and almost raged out of her control. Over time, as she controlled her own emotions, she became able to control the demons as well.

=== Day of Vengeance ===
In Day of Vengeance #2, an Infinite Crisis tie-in, the Spectre, then unstable and believing that magic equaled evil, disabled Madame Xanadu and took her eyes.

In the Day of Vengeance special it is revealed that Xanadu is still blind. She has regrown her eyes 14 times, only for them to be burned out again, because the Spectre's powers are beyond hers. However, Xanadu's abode would be the rallying point of the offense against the Spectre, gathering the Phantom Stranger, Zatanna, and Nabu.

Xanadu has also found a way around the Spectre's curse by training an adept, Daena, to read the cards for her. Through Daena, she sees the destruction of the world with the Spectre winning and destroying everything. It is at her place that Nabu begins his offense against the Spectre as well as the strategy for restoring the Rock of Eternity.

=== One Year Later ===
Madame Xanadu's standing in the new magic order has yet to be explored in detail, but it is known that she is still trying to cure her blindness. She assists the Shadowpact when members of their team were temporarily blinded by the mystical powers of the villains known as 'the Congregation'. It is the mystical aspect that allows her to help, though some of the group are able to heal the blindness on their own.

Madame Xanadu appears in Countdown #50, operating out of "Hokus & Pokus Occult Curiosities" in Greenwich Village. She is unable to help Mary Marvel locate Captain Marvel Jr. She does advise Mary to avoid Gotham City, because "it isn't safe for magic".

=== The New 52 ===
In The New 52, Madame Xanadu has resurfaced as the result of Barry Allen's unintentional tampering with the timestream and the merging of the Vertigo, WildStorm and DC Universes.

In the new continuity, Xanadu is no longer blind and despite her past as Nimue still applying, she seems to have taken a more proactive stance during the Fall of Camelot. Instead of quietly observing like she did in her core miniseries, she staunchly opposed the surrendering of Excalibur to the Lady of the Lake, and then started traveling with Jason Blood, meeting other Dark Ages–based heroes and villains such as Vandal Savage and Shining Knight. The Dark Ages Xanadu is seen in a relationship with Blood and Etrigan.

The present-day Madame Xanadu is featured in the DC Universe reboot, in Justice League Dark, resuming her role as the keystone and supporter of the magical community in the DCU. Xanadu assists the 'Dark League' in various incidents, such as Zatanna vanishing and the House of Mystery letting loose demonic threats in Manhattan. She is later revealed to be the mother of the supervillain Doctor Destiny.

National Comics, a revival of the anthology title, was launched in July 2012. The title expanded upon the New 52 universe by presenting single-issue stories about different DC characters, each by a different creative team. This includes Madame X #1 by Rob Williams and drawn by Trevor Hairsine and Fiona Staples.

=== Dawn of DC ===
In the series "The New Golden Age", Deadman and Detective Chimp bring the snow globe that was with the Huntress from an alternate future to Xanadu to get a reading off of it. Xanadu advises Deadman and Detective Chimp to get the snow globe back to Huntress, as Per Degaton will kill her if she does not have it with her. After Degaton is repelled, Xanadu appears at the Justice Society of America's headquarters with Deadman and Detective Chimp. She states that Degaton has made a deal with the Lords of Chaos and that he must be imprisoned soon or else the Justice Society will be erased. Xanadu, Deadman, and Detective Chimp accompany the JSA in catching up to Huntress who had met up with Batman. It is revealed that the snow globe is keeping Huntress alive and contains the Flashpoint universe.

== Powers and abilities ==
Madame Xanadu has a supernatural sensitivity to occult activities and mystic phenomena. She uses tarot cards to interpret what she senses, and is also able to tell the future of others. Xanadu can levitate objects, teleport herself, and banish demons. Xanadu's parlor is full of magical books and objects, as well as jars containing the essences of malevolent entities. She rarely uses these objects of power, merely acting as a guardian of them.

Xanadu is immortal, never aging and unable to die of natural causes thanks to her deal with Death. In the 2005 story Day of Vengeance, not even the Spectre could kill her, and instead blinded her to make her harmless.

== Other versions ==
- In the Tangent Comics series Joker's Wild, Madame Xanadu is one of three women who masquerade as Tangent's heroic version of the Joker.
- An alternate universe version of Madame Xanadu appears in Flashpoint.

== In other media ==
=== Television ===
- Madame Xanadu appears in Young Justice, voiced by Cree Summer. This version is a New Orleans–based con artist.
- Madame Xanadu appears in Swamp Thing, portrayed by Jeryl Prescott.
- Madame Xanadu was intended to appear in a self-titled DC Extended Universe series prior to its cancellation.

=== Film ===
Madame Xanadu was intended to appear in Guillermo del Toro's adaptation of the Justice League Dark comics prior to its cancellation.

=== Video games ===
Madame Xanadu appears as a character summon in Scribblenauts Unmasked: A DC Comics Adventure.

== Collected editions ==
- Madame Xanadu Vol. 1 Disenchanted (240 pages, collects Madame Xanadu #1-10)
- Madame Xanadu Vol. 2 Exodus Noir (128 pages, collects Madame Xanadu #11-15)
- Madame Xanadu Vol. 3 Broken House of Cards (200 pages, collects Madame Xanadu #16-21)
- Madame Xanadu Vol. 4 Extra-Sensory (collects Madame Xanadu #22-29)

== Awards ==
- Madame Xanadu vol. 2 was nominated for a number of 2009 Eisner Awards: "Best New Series", "Best Penciller/Inker or Penciller/Inker Team" (Amy Reeder Hadley and inker Richard Friend) and "Best Cover Artist" (Hadley).
- Eisner Award 2010 Nominee: "Best Penciller/Inker or Penciller/Inker Team" (Michael Kaluta), Madame Xanadu #11–15: "Exodus Noir" (Vertigo/DC).
