= Whip (character) =

Name for several DC Comics characters

The Whip is the alias used by different characters in American comic books published by DC Comics with four of them being superheroes. The third one made his first appearance in Flash Comics #1 (January 1940). The fourth Whip appeared in 2005 and was created by Grant Morrison. The fifth Whip appeared in 2011 and was created by Fabian Nicieza.

== Fictional character biography ==
=== Fernando Suarez (El Castigo) ===
Whip

Publication information
- Publisher: DC Comics
- First appearance: Flash Comics #1 (January 1940)
- Created by: Grant Morrison; Fabian Nicieza

In-story information
- Alter ego: Rodrigo "Rodney" Gaynor
- Team affiliations: Unnamed assassin: League of Assassins
- Notable aliases: Fernando Suarez (El Castigo); Johnny Lash; Shelly Gaynor; Unnamed assassin
- Abilities: Agility; Enhanced weaponry; Hand to hand combat

The first Whip was Don Fernando Suarez. In 1840s Mexico, Fernando was the protector of the poor in a small Mexican town. His name was El Castigo, which was incorrectly translated from Spanish as The Whip (it should be "The Punishment"). The Whip was the first Latin American superhero in mainstream American comic books.

=== Johnny Lash ===
The second Whip had no relation to Don Fernando. His name was Johnny Lash, and he appeared in Crack Western #70, published by Quality Comics.

=== Rodrigo Gaynor ===
Rodrigo "Rodney" Elwood Gaynor is a descendant of Don Suarez who assumes the Whip mantle to battle land barons who tax the poor. He becomes an ally of Vigilante and a member of the All-Star Squadron.

=== Shelly Gaynor ===
Shelly Gaynor is the granddaughter of Rod Gaynor and a columnist for the Daily Recorder. She becomes the fourth Whip and a member of the Seven Soldiers before being killed by the Sheeda.

=== Unnamed assassin ===
Another female Whip, unconnected to any of the previous versions, appears as a member of the League of Assassins.

== In other media ==
An original incarnation of the Whip appears in the My Adventures with Superman episode "Mobile Suit Toyman", voiced by Melanie Minichino. This version is a Russian thief who wields kryptonite-powered whips.
