= Bulleteer =

- Seven Soldiers: The Bulleteer #4, art by Yanick Paquette.

Publication information
- Publisher: DC Comics
- First appearance: Seven Soldiers: Bulleteer #1 (November 2005)
- Created by: Grant Morrison (writer); Yanick Paquette (artist)

In-story information
- Alter ego: Alix Harrower
- Species: Human
- Place of origin: Earth
- Team affiliations: Seven Soldiers; Justice League
- Abilities: Superhuman strength and durability Flight

Bulleteer (Alix Harrower) is a fictional character and DC Comics superheroine, a member of the Seven Soldiers. She debuted in Seven Soldiers: The Bulleteer #1 (November 2005), and was created by Grant Morrison and Yanick Paquette. The character is based in part on the Fawcett Comics character Bulletgirl.

== Fictional character biography ==
27-year-old Alix Harrower is married to Lance, a research scientist who has developed a thin metal skin that can bond with collagen, turning tissue indestructibly hard. When this "smartskin" is applied to a living being, the subject gains superhuman strength. Though the potential military applications are obvious, Lance dreams of using it on himself, modeling a superhero career after the WWII superheroes Bulletman and Bulletgirl. After testing it on himself, Lance begins to suffocate; when he touches Alix, the smartskin bonds to her. Alix is saved thanks to medics gaining access to bare skin covered by her wedding ring. Lance is not wearing his and suffocates to death.

Alix spirals into depression as her new appearance forces her to quit her job teaching autistic children. Another emotional blow comes at the discovery that Lance's superhero dreams stemmed from a fixation on superhero-based pornography and an online affair with Sally Sonic, an immortal superhuman porn star. Distraught, Alix attempts suicide. While trying to find a structure hard enough to kill her on impact, she comes across a train wreck and saves the people still inside. After those she saved call her a superhero, she decides to live up to the title, taking the name Bulleteer.

Alix is attacked by Sally Sonic, who is revealed to be a 1940s superheroine with the body of a superpowered teenager. After outliving her friends and family and being forced to live in an abusive orphanage, Sally Smart met "Vita-Man", a superhuman who manipulated her into a sexual relationship and a role in a pornographic film. Sally was pulled into the seedy underworld of superhuman sex work and drug abuse, and eventually goaded Lance into the experiment that killed him and transformed Alix. Alix refuses to let Sally take her grief out on her and manages to knock Sally out with a car engine, despite a broken arm. Afterwards, a ghostly Greg Saunders approaches Alix and attempts to recruit her to 'save the world'. Though she is not even sure that Saunders is real, she rejects him and the entire superhero role.

Bulleteer made later appearances in 52 as a member of an interim JLA group, and in Birds of Prey as one of Oracle's potential recruits for the team. After leaving the Justice League, Bulleteer keeps the communicator given to her by Firestorm.

In the 2024 series The Question: All Along the Watchtower, Bulleteer returns to the Justice League as part of the group's expanded roster. She is entrusted with overseeing the Justice League Watchtower's armory, which contains dangerous devices and weaponry.

== Powers and abilities ==
Alix Harrower was originally a normal human with no superhuman abilities. After bonding with "Smartskin" created by her husband, Alix's skin was coated in a virtually indestructible metal shell, though it is implied that her bones and organs are mostly unaltered. This metal coating grants Alix a degree of superhuman strength and nigh-invulnerability. In her appearances after Seven Soldiers, Alix also seems to have developed the power of flight.

== Reception ==
Bulleteer's design has been criticized as an example of the "male gaze", a concept where women are oversexualized from the perspective of men. Her self-titled series, Seven Soldiers: Bulleteer, was described as "a meta-narrative about the process of creating and promoting a superhero... the reader follows Alix's rise to celebrity status as Bulleteer, witnessing her continuing discomfort with the processes by which she is effectively packaged and put on display".

Bulleteer and related series in the Seven Soldiers storyline focus on characters who are either unaging or seek to slow their own aging. Most prominently, Lance Harrower created the smartskin in a bid to gain eternal youth, while Bulleteer's enemy Sally Sonic appears younger than she is due to her powers transforming her into a younger, unaging form.
