= Zatanna =

DC Comics superheroine

- Various incarnations of Zatanna, as depicted in Zatanna: Bring Down The House #4 (2024). Art by Nicola Scott.

Publication information
- Publisher: DC Comics
- First appearance: Hawkman #4 (November 1964)
- Created by: Gardner Fox (writer); Murphy Anderson (artist)

In-story information
- Alter ego: Zatanna Zatara
- Species: Homo magi
- Place of origin: San Francisco, California
- Team affiliations: Justice League Dark; Justice League; Sentinels of Magic; Seven Soldiers; Lords of Chaos
- Partnerships: Doctor Fate (various); John Constantine; Batman; Wonder Woman; Black Canary; Swamp Thing; The Flash; Raven; Jacob zatara
- Notable aliases: Mistress of Magic; Princess of Prestidigitation; Sorceress Supreme; Prime Magus; Magic Maid; Emilia Humina; Evig "Eve" Doolb; Tetrakis-Megistos
- Abilities: Mastery of various forms of magic; primarily commands magical energies, cosmic forces, and spell-casting through speaking commands backwards, although not required; Occult and demonology expert; Master stage magician and escape artist; Skilled hand-to-hand combatant; Telekinesis & Flight; Telepathy & Memory Manipulation; Teleportation & Dimensional Travel; Time Manipulation (Chronokinesis); Healing & Resurrection; Illusion Creation & Invisibility; Multilingualism

Altered in-story information for adaptations to other media
- Notable aliases: Doctor Fate

Zatanna Zatara (/zəˈtænə zəˈtɑːrə/), known mononymously as Zatanna, is a superhero appearing in American comic books published by DC Comics. The character was created by Gardner Fox and Murphy Anderson, and first appeared in Hawkman #4 (November 1964). Throughout the character's history, Zatanna is depicted as one of DC Comics' most well-regarded supernatural superheroes.

The character is depicted as a renowned sorceress belonging to the fictional Homo magi race, a subset of humans endowed with innate potential to manipulate magic. She is also the daughter of Giovanni Zatara and Sindella, the former a renowned stage magician and sorcerer after whom she models herself, and the latter whose lineage connects her to the royal line of Atlantis. In the future, Zatanna has a son in another universe named Jacob Zatara. Zatanna balances her life as an international celebrity stage magician and superhero who often fights against the forces of evil and serves as both a mystic consultant and a notable member of several teams such as the Justice League, Justice League Dark, and the Sentinels of Magic. Within the DC Universe, she is regarded as one of the most powerful magic users.

Zatanna has appeared in several different media adaptations, including appearing in several television series in the DC Animated Universe, notably voiced by Julie Brown and Jennifer Hale. She has also appeared as a recurring character in the final three seasons of Smallville, portrayed by Serinda Swan. Younger versions of the character appears in Young Justice and Justice League Action, voiced by Lacey Chabert, and DC Super Hero Girls, voiced by Kari Wahlgren.

== Publication history ==
Created by writer Gardner Fox and artist Murphy Anderson, Zatanna first appeared in Hawkman #4 (November 1964). When she is introduced, she is on a quest to find her father Zatara who made his first appearance in Action Comics #1 but had not been published regularly for several years. The storyline crossed multiple comics published by DC at the time, culminating in issues of Justice League of America, also written by Fox.

In 2026, a new Zatanna ongoing series was announced written and drawn by Jamal Campbell. The series explores her role as "Prime Magus", a role that makes her an overseer and guide in the supernatural world.

== Fictional character biography ==
=== Pre-Crisis on Infinite Earth ===
==== Original origin ====
Zatanna, as she appeared during her debut on a splash page of Hawkman #4 (November 1964). Art by Murphy Anderson.

In her original origin, Zatanna was born to human Giovanni Zatara and Homo magi Sindella, inheriting her mother's natural affinity for magical powers. Six months after her birth, her mother disappeared and was presumably dead, leading her to be raised by her father. Growing up to be a stage magician with genuine magical powers and modelling herself similarly to her father, Zatara later mysteriously disappears, leading her to travel abroad to perfect her magical craft while searching for her father. Unknown to her, the details of her parents' disappearance were revealed over time; her mother would later return to her people, a clan of Homo magi known as the "Hidden Ones" and her father was cursed by evil sorceress Allura that would kill both himself and his daughter should he see her again, leading him to reluctantly distance himself from her.

==== Zatara Quest and the JLA ====
In her debut, she is introduced during her quest to find her father, first encountering Hawkman and Hawkgirl. During her quest, she encounters various other superheroes such as Batman and Robin (wherein she was disguised as a witch under the control of villain the Outsider) and teams up with others including the Atom, Green Lantern, and the Elongated Man. Eventually, she learns her father's fate and finds him in the mystic dimension of Kharma and encounters the evil Allura, where her good counterpart forces her to lift the curse, reuniting father and daughter after two decades.

Not long after, she is elected to become a valued member of the Justice League of America, although in her tenure her powers were originally diminished, allowing her only to control natural forces. Both her mother and her true background is later revealed to her, when Zatanna learns the cause of her mother's disappearance and reason for faking her death: possessing a "medula jewel" within her brain, it acted as a source of power for her clan of the Hidden Ones. Fearing her clan would hunt down her daughter, who also inherited a medulla jewel, she telepathically warns her, with Sindella's magic having the odd side-effect of transforming her costume to one resembling her own. With her father and JLA, they meet Sindella, where she explains her disappearances and sacrifices herself to save Zatanna and Zatara from captivity.

=== Post Crisis on Infinite Earths ===
==== Revised background ====
After the Crisis on Infinite Earths crossover event, much of Zatanna's history remained the same although several changes came about to her background; her new history reinforced her father's disappearance to have taken place when she was eighteen years old. At some point prior to her father's death, a young Zatanna also met John Constantine, with whom she once engaged in tantric sex. Her father later became aware of their relationship, disapproving of Constantine.

The 1998 DCU Heroes Secret Files reveals her birth to be thirty years ago, placing her birth year at around 1968. Other key events for the character is referenced to having taken place, including her becoming a superhero and stage magician nine years prior (1989) and her attempt to rescue her mother alongside her father and the JLA five years prior. It is also eventually revealed she is childhood friends with Bruce Wayne (the future Batman), who came to be trained in escape artistry under her father in his training.

==== Death of Zatara and Timothy Hunter ====
In the "Murder of Crows" storyline, John Constantine, Zatara, Mento, Sargon the Sorcerer, and Zatanna hold a seance to combat the entity known as the Great Evil Beast alongside demonic and divine forces at Wintersgate Manor, the home of Baron Winters in Georgetown, Washington D.C., which is a temporal threshold to other planes of reality. Due to her past history with Constantine, Giovanni is unusually more protective against Constantine. During the seance, the Beast becomes aware of the seance and after Sargon's death, targets Zatanna by attempting to burn her to death. Giovanni sacrifices himself by taking the effects instead, killing him but sparing his daughter's life. In Neil Gaiman's The Books of Magic limited series, for a time, Zatanna looks after Timothy Hunter, a young boy who is destined to become the most powerful wizard in the world, and his girlfriend Molly, who was cursed by the Queen of Fairies to be unable to touch anything in the human world.

==== Come Together, JLA, and the Sentinels of Magic ====
In her 1993 limited series titled Zatanna: Come Together, she battles the dark sorcerer Tannarak while her mother's spirit, Sindella, encourages her to battle the demon Xaos. Within the series, her lineage is revealed to be connected to the royalty of Atlantis (particularly the Lord of Order, Arion) and the Xaos demon was responsible for its sinking. She also undergoes a change in costume and opt out of using logomancy in favor of amplifying her magical powers with her mother's artifacts and traditional spell-casting.

In the 1999 "Days of Judgement" storyline and mini-series, Zatanna is among numerous mystic superheroes who gathered to battle the demon Asmodel, who plotted to usurp the powers of the Spectre. With Earth's superheroes unable to properly contend with a significant mystical threat, the Sentinels of Magic is formed with Zatanna as a founding member. The team eventually prevails and is trusted with the Spear of Destiny as a contingency against Hal Jordan's Spectre should he ever lose control of himself. The next challenge to the Sentinels appears in the 2001 "Black Baptism" storyline, where mobster demons, the Diablos, targets the Sentinels to drain them of their souls and power. Zatanna is one of the first members to be felled to "Anita Soulfeeda", a "succubus" seeking to ascend their ranks. Due to efforts from Sebastian Faust and the Justice League, despite the former's negative reputation, Anita is revealed to be a disguised, vengeful Enchantress and is put under the control of Felix Faust, who himself also been possessed by the spirit of Hermes Trismegistus. In the "Obsidian Age", Zatanna and the Sentinels appears when the Justice League vanishes in the past searching for Aquaman. An emergency protocol created by Batman assembles a contingency League, with Jason Blood acting as the team's magical expert. When Gamemnae, ancient Atlantean sorceress and would-be conqueror, is identified, she uses a quagmire spell to absorb Zatanna and Tempest into herself. When Nightwing, the leader in the new league, asks for Blood to use Etrigan against Gamemnae, Blood instead insists Zatanna is the one needed and sacrifices himself in her quagmire spell to free Zatanna. She joins the others in travelling back to ancient Atlantis, where Aquaman has been trapped in a pool of water as a water wraith, Firestorm creating a channel between the pool and the sea before Zatanna casts a spell that allows the water-based Aquaman to control the entire ocean as his body, allowing him to sink Atlantis in the past and present and disrupt Gamemnae's power.

In her 2003 solo one-shot Zatanna: Everyday Magic, she battles Nimue Ravensong, a magic-user jealous of Zatanna's ability to use magic naturally and without committing sacrifices. Nimue seduced and cursed John Constantine, leading Zatanna into conflict with the sorceress.

==== Identity Crisis and the aftermath ====
During the 2004 Identity Crisis storyline, it was revealed that Doctor Light had years earlier raped the now-murdered Sue Dibny, the wife of hero Elongated Man. Opting for a magical lobotomization of Light due to threatening other JLA members' family. When Batman appears in the middle of the process and tries to stop it, Zatanna also erases his memories. In the present time, Light becomes a suspect as his memories return, prompting the League towards a manhunt but Zatanna's role in mind-wiping others is revealed. While Jean Loring's role in Sue's murder alongside implicating other villains is revealed, Zatanna's role in erasing various villain's memories throughout the years causes a moral rift within the League as her reputation deteriorates and her trustworthiness is called into questioned, especially by longtime friends such as Batman. In storylines exploring the aftermath such as "Crisis of Conscience", Catwoman and the Secret Society of Super Villains are among those mind-wiped in earlier years, the former done to force her towards a more righteous path.

A 2005 four-issue Zatanna limited series was published as part of Grant Morrison's Seven Soldiers event. In it, at a support group for superheroes, she recounts a failed magical ritual to search for her father's tomes, during which one of her past spells summons a shapeshifter named Gwydion, who kills her companions. This trauma, combined with her guilt from her former mind-wipes, robs her of her powers. With the help of her new apprentice, Misty Kilgore, she captures Gwydion to use as her own. She eventually regains her confidence and powers, and uses them to defeat Zor, a rogue Time Tailor who released the Sheeda as a plague to infect and degrade the universe. As a reward, the other Time Tailors allow her one last meeting with her father, who reveals that his books were written for her, his "greatest spell and gift to the world". In the final battle against the Sheeda, Zatanna casts a spell to move time and space, retroactively positioning the Seven Soldiers to overthrow the Sheeda.

In Detective Comics #833 (August 2007), it is stated that Zatanna's father was a friend of Thomas Wayne. Zatara trained Bruce Wayne in the art of escape, and Bruce and Zatanna were childhood friends, although Batman believes that he has never met her in Justice League of America #51, and her only memory of meeting him is while she was disguised. Bruce helps Zatanna investigate the death of one of her former assistants; all clues point to performer Ivar Loxias. Loxias is revealed to be the Joker in disguise; he shoots Zatanna in the throat and incapacitates Batman. Zatanna is able to heal herself by writing a curing spell in her own blood, and she is instrumental in foiling the Joker's scheme, driving Joker insane in the process. Bruce puts Zatanna's betrayal behind him, allowing the two to renew their friendship.

On the "Roll Call" of Justice League of America #22 (August 2008), Zatanna is listed as a part of the team. Called upon to help with Red Tornado's restoration in his android form, she aids the League when they are attacked by a new, powerful iteration of Amazo. During the battle, Zatanna has her mouth magically removed with her spells, and once again uses her blood to write out spells and restore it. After that Wonder Woman throws off Amazo's concentration and free Zatanna. Zatanna then defeats Amazo once and for all by using the Red Tornado's soul. Following this battle, Zatanna rejoins the team.

Zatanna accompanies the second Firestorm (Jason Rusch), Black Lightning, and Batman to Metropolis after they come to believe Kimiyo Hoshi has been kidnapped by agents of the Shadow Cabinet. After a brief conflict, Zatanna and the others are informed by teenage superheroine Rocket that Kimiyo's perceived abduction was actually a misunderstanding caused by the Shadow Cabinet's mission to seek out her help in dealing with Starbreaker. With assistance from Hardware and Icon, Zatanna and her comrades are able to defeat Starbreaker in a battle in the Himalayas.

In the 2009 Gotham City Sirens series, Zatanna is visited and restrained by Poison Ivy, who interacts via a tree and asks her if her encounter with Catwoman changed Selina in any way. She later a leave of absence from the JLA, only to reappear during a battle with Despero. Once he is defeated, Zatanna informs the League of the apocalyptic events of the Blackest Night taking place across the globe. After taking the team to the Hall of Justice to find Firestorm, she is forced to fight the undead form of her father, continually pitting the black magic he wields against her own. it is implied while she was successful in banishing the Black Lantern, she was left psychologically scarred from having to kill her father again. In the aftermath, Kimiyo mentions that Zatanna is one of the members who has left the team.

In her self-titled solo series in 2010, no longer an active member of the JLA, Zatanna is asked by officer Dale Colton to help solve a murder case at a restaurant frequented by mobsters. Zatanna informs Dale that the murderer was the sorcerer Brother Night, who rules the supernatural crime scene in San Francisco. After Zatanna shows up at Night's demonic nightclub and threatens him, he responds by summoning a demon, but Zatanna defeats and imprisons the demon to aid her later. A crooked casino owner who had made a deal for eternal youth with the demon of avarice by selling the souls of his brides to the demon attempts to use a love potion to win Zatanna's soul. When her cousin Zachary Zatara breaks the spell, the casino owner begs Zatanna to turn him into a soulless lump of gold in order to escape torment in Hell. Aside from Brother Night, Zatanna faces other threats, such as Oscar Hample, a man who tried to murder her when she was a child and was turned into a puppet by her father. The Zatanna series ended with issue #16 (October 2011).

The Black Canary and Zatanna graphic novel Bloodspell written by Paul Dini and drawn by Joe Quinones was to be released in 2012, but was delayed until May 2014. The story centered around a 16-year-old Black Canary's first meeting with Zatanna.

=== The New 52 onward ===
==== Revised background ====
Within the new continuity following Flashpoint and The New 52, details of Zatanna's past were altered; her birth years was established to be around 1987, making her younger than her previous depictions. The appearance of her mother also differed and aspects of her past were seemingly changed. Among those changes included a new love interest, Nick Necro, whom she started dating years before she would meet her future teammate, John Constantine. The trio were in a polyamorous relationship until Necro's obsession with the Book of Magic drove a wedge between their relationship, causing Constantine and Zatanna to become exclusive to one another for a time.

==== Justice League Dark (2011-2015) ====
In the new continuity following the Flashpoint event, Zatanna joins the Justice League Dark, a supernatural off-shoot of the Justice League dedicated to battling the arcane forces led by John Constantine. She teams up with various superheroes such as Etrigan, Swamp Thing, Nightmare Nurse, Madame Xanadu, and others. Based in Constantine's House of Mystery, the team first battled a wild Enchantress and then Felix Faust, Nick Necro, and reluctant turncoat Doctor Mist as Necro works to acquire the mythical Books of Magic, a source of obsession since his shared history with Zatanna and John Constantine.

==== DC Rebirth ====
Zatanna made her first Rebirth appearance in Detective Comics #958, assisting Bruce Wayne in taking out a robot chasing after a cult member. Later on, Zatanna shows Bruce magic. Later Bruce sees her again and asks her to teach him more about magic. Ultimately she declines and wipes his memory. After the conclusion of the main storyline of the DC Rebirth Batwoman series, Zatanna is implied to be an outpatient therapist of sorts for Beth Kane.

In 2018, a new Justice League Dark series began, with a redesigned Zatanna being part of the team. Zatanna travels to Northern Italy to bind a group of demons called Il Osservatori in a story called Zatanna: Sleight of Hand, published in the DC New Talent Showcase 2018 #1.

== Characterization ==
=== Description and personality ===
The character is portrayed as a stage magician and genuine superheroine sorceress that battles the forces of evil with her magical powers, which is performed by speaking the desired results backwards, and balances time between acting in both role. She has adopted various roles in her publication history, being a premier mystic consultant, a leader of superhero teams, and owns her own side business that provides services for magical and multiverse matters confidentially. Most recently, the character was elevated to "Prime Magus", becoming a guide and overseer of magic within the supernatural aspect of the DC Universe. Her reputation as a sorceress also evolved and changed over time; depictions during the 1980s featured her as formidable despite not being among the most powerful. Eventually, she rose to be credited as the "Sorceress Supreme" on occasion. Both herself and the modern incarnation of Doctor Fate have been stated to be the powerful magic warriors on Earth.

Some of her personality traits describe her as being confident, intelligent, and self-assured in nature. Zatanna was also originally stated to be half human and half homo magic, the former from her paternal side but is later depicted as solely a homo magi. Her paternal side makes her a descendant of Leonardo da Vinci and related to Alessandro Cagliostro, Nicolas Flamel, and Evan Fulcanelli, granting her of French and Italian ancestry. Her maternal line also ties to the Hidden One magi clan and ancient Atlantean royal, which includes demigod and Lord of Order, Arion.

=== Powers and abilities ===
Zatanna, as she appeared on the cover of Superman Vol. 6 (2024)

The character's heritage grants her command over mystic and cosmic forces, allowing her to manipulate them; her most preferred method includes performing magic by saying phrases or spells backwards. This variation ("Logomancy"), requires focus and can be alternatively cast via written form or using sign language in a backwards formation. Zatanna is also well versed in black magic, tarot reading for insight or divination, and can draw power from a collection of mystic artifacts similarly to other magic practitioners. In a diminished state, her magical powers only allowed her to manipulate natural forces (earth, air, water, wind) and objects. Zatanna also possesses a "medula jewel", an unnatural source of magic developed within the brain of royals in the Hidden Ones clan that can act as a source of magic. It appears within one person per generation, with Sindella being the previous one prior to Zatanna. In addition to her powers, Zatanna is also a talented stage magician, a trained hand-to-hand combatant, escape artist, and is versed in several different languages including Spanish and ASL.

Having a diverse collection of artifacts from both sides of her family from past generations, Zatanna inherited the Shadowcrest Manor, the ancestral home of the Zatar family that relocates to different places periodically and is invisible to most. Access to it is strict, requiring special keys or voice recognition. The manor includes the collection of artifacts, a private library, a pocket space closet, and bestiary. Some artifacts includes the Talisman of Atlantis and a magical staff owned by her father. When using both artifacts in tandem, it offers easier control and usage over magic. The Demongraphy is a book offering a comprehensive, encyclopedic entries on demonic entities and is updated magically in real-time. The Gnosis Sphere, able to answer any questions posed directly to it, is regarded as the most dangerous object protected by the Zatara family. She also appropriated the Sleepless Queen's sword, an enchanted blade capable of transforming those damaged by it into nightmarish forms of themselves.

While powerful, the character has some limitations; due to logomancy's reliance of vocal commanders, she has been incapacitated by being gagged and her mouth restrained, forcing her to alternate to other methods to channeling her magic. Her magic can also have aspects of instability, with it increasing when not used and excessive use can deplete her, straining her physical well-being. Her powers are also linked to her self-confidence, with significant physiological problems once rendering her powerless stemming from a lower level of confidence and self-esteem. Her powers has also been surpassed by other such as Enchantress.

== Other versions ==
- Conjura, a character based on Zatanna, appears in DC Super Dictionary.
- An alternate universe version of Zatanna appears in Batman: Holy Terror. This version is an agent of the Privy Council, a totalitarian religious group that rules North America.
- Wanda Zatara / White Witch, a composite character based on Zatanna and Marvel Comics character Scarlet Witch, appears in the Amalgam Comics universe.
- An alternate universe version of Zatanna appears in JLA: Another Nail.
- Annataz Arataz, Zatanna's evil Earth-3 counterpart, appears in Countdown to Final Crisis #23.
- Besides Zatara II, Zatanna has another child named Jacob Zatara—but that’s for another universe.with whom he/she maintains a relationship of respect and affection
- An alternate universe version of Zatanna appears in the Flashpoint storyline. This version is a member of the Secret Seven and part of a motorcycle gang.
- An alternate universe version of Zatanna appears in DC Comics Bombshells. This version is of Jewish and Romani descent and was previously forced to aid the Nazis, during which she befriended Raven before eventually escaping.
- An alternate universe version of Zatanna appears in Mystik U. This version is a student of the titular academy and girlfriend of Sebastian Faust.
- Zatanna appears in the web comic Zatanna and the Ripper, co-published by DC Comics and Webtoon.
- Zatanna appears in the graphic novel Zatanna and the House of Secrets. This version lives in the titular house with her father Zatara and rabbit Pocus.
- Zatanna appears in the graphic novel Zatanna: The Jewel of Gravesend.
- An alternate universe of Zatanna appears in Absolute Wonder Woman. This version is a captive of Veronica Cale and is forced to join the Suicide Squad to destroy Wonder Woman.

== Supporting cast ==
Since the characters' inception, she has garnered a supporting cast over the years; Zatara is the most re-occurring character within her series, being their father who appears posthumously and in flashbacks, having raised and taught her the mystic arts, stage magic, and defending herself in perilous situations. Her mother, Sindella, is frequently mentioned and appears posthumously. A descendant of Arion, she is of the Magi clan, the Hidden Ones. with recent stories reveal her as the archmage, a protector role. Her younger cousin, Zach Zatara, is a fellow stage magician with similar powers and uses the "Zatara" name, but is characterized to be more condescending and partygoing. Several other superheroes have also served as cast members: fortune-teller Madame Xanadu and Blue Devil appear often as supernatural friends and allies alongside the Justice League Dark. Outside her series, Misty Kilgore once served as her apprentice.

The character also has a civilian cast; as a stage magician, Zatanna's crew includes tomboy Mikey Dowling, whose sex was irreversibly changed to female and acts as her carpenter, creating props for her shows. She also has several male assistants, including manager Arnie, whom is also in a relationship with crew member Andre, and sword dancer Adam Aesford. Kasim is an Indian man who serves as majordomo of her residence, the Shadowcrest. Hassan the Mummy serves as the Shadowcrest's bodyguard.

=== Love interests ===
Her most significant love interest in both comics and media is John Constantine, whose affiliation has been characterized as turbulent in various stories,with them meeting early into her adulthood and once practiced tantric sex. Following the New 52, their relationship originally was polyamorous involving Nick Necro before becoming exclusive. Other love interests include Josh, the African-American son of a cove witch leader, Dale Colton, San Francisco detective fathered by one of her most notorious enemies, Brother Night, and Batman, the last whom has been depicted as both a childhood friend and late dating partner prior to becoming a vigilante. The character has also been mentioned to have dated Doctor Thirteen and Cyborg. She also had a flirtatious relationship with Flash (Barry Allen) and Blue Devil.

== In other media ==
=== Television ===
- Zatanna appears in series set in the DC Animated Universe (DCAU):
  - She first appears in a self-titled episode of Batman: The Animated Series, voiced by Julie Brown. This version befriended Batman as a youth and developed a crush on him while he was training under her father Zatara. In the present, while working as a magician, she reunites with Batman while foiling criminal magic debunker Montague Kane's plans.
  - Zatanna makes a non-speaking cameo appearance in The New Batman Adventures episode "Chemistry".
  - Zatanna makes a cameo appearance in a photograph depicted in the Batman Beyond episode "Out of the Past".
  - Zatanna appears in Justice League Unlimited, voiced by Jennifer Hale in "This Little Piggy" and by Juliet Landau in "The Balance". As of this series, she has joined the Justice League while continuing her stage magician career. Additionally, she is capable of reciting spells without speaking and while speaking normally.
- Zatanna appears in Smallville, portrayed by Serinda Swan.
- Zatanna appears in the teaser for the Batman: The Brave and the Bold episode "Chill of the Night!", voiced again by Jennifer Hale.
- Zatanna appears in Young Justice, voiced by Lacey Chabert. This version is initially a teenager and member of the Team who becomes romantically involved with Robin. After donning the Helmet of Fate to defeat Klarion the Witch Boy, Nabu refuses to release her until Zatara offers to take her place. Ever since, she works to free her father. In the second season, an adult Zatanna joins the Justice League. In the fourth season, Zatanna trains the Sentinels of Magic to help her free Zatara by convincing Nabu to rotate between all of them.
- Zatanna appears in Teen Titans Go!, voiced by Kari Wahlgren.
- Zatanna appears in Justice League Action, voiced again by Lacey Chabert as an adult and by Dayci Brookshire as a child.
- Zatanna appears in DC Super Hero Girls, voiced again by Kari Wahlgren. This version, also known by her first name "Zee", is a dramatic fashionista and student at Metropolis High.
- Zatanna makes non-speaking cameo appearances in Harley Quinn as an associate of the Justice League. As of "A Very Problematic Valentine's Day Special", she has entered a relationship with the Flash.
- Zatanna appears in Batwheels, voiced again by Kari Wahlgren. This version is a member of the Justice League and drives a sentient car named Presto (voiced by Kailey Snider).

=== Film ===
==== Live-action ====
- In 2005, screenwriter Hadley Davis announced that she had written an action-comedy featuring a teenage version of Zatanna.
- Zatanna appears in a proposed Guillermo del Toro film project based on the Justice League Dark, which was meant to be part of the DC Extended Universe.
- A live-action Zatanna film, developed by Warner Bros. Discovery and Bad Robot and with Emerald Fennell serving as a writer, was in production before it was cancelled as of March 2021.

==== Animation ====
- An unnamed alternate universe version of Zatanna makes a non-speaking cameo appearance in Justice League: Crisis on Two Earths as a minor member of the Crime Syndicate.
- The Young Justice incarnation of Zatanna makes a non-speaking cameo appearance in Scooby-Doo! WrestleMania Mystery.
- Zatanna appears in the DC Animated Movie Universe (DCAMU) films Justice League Dark and Justice League Dark: Apokolips War, voiced by Camilla Luddington. This version is a member of Justice League Dark.
- Zatanna appears in Lego DC Comics Super Heroes: The Flash, voiced by Kate Micucci.
- Zatanna makes a cameo appearance in Teen Titans Go! To the Movies.
- Zatanna appears in Justice League: Crisis on Infinite Earths.

=== Video games ===
- Zatanna appears as a playable character in Justice League Heroes, voiced by Kari Wahlgren.
- Zatanna appears as a non-playable character (NPC) in DC Universe Online, voiced by Claire Hamilton.
- Zatanna appears as a downloadable playable character in Lego Batman 2: DC Super Heroes, voiced again by Kari Wahlgren.
- Zatanna appears as a playable character in Young Justice: Legacy, voiced again by Lacey Chabert.
- Zatanna appears as a downloadable playable character in Injustice: Gods Among Us, voiced again by Lacey Chabert.
- Zatanna appears as a playable character in Lego Batman 3: Beyond Gotham, voiced again by Kari Wahlgren.
- Zatanna appears as a playable character in Infinite Crisis.
- Zatanna makes non-speaking cameo appearances in Doctor Fate and Raiden's endings in Injustice 2. In the latter, she serves as a founding member of Justice League Dark.
- Zatanna appears as a playable character in DC Unchained.
- Zatanna appears as a playable character in Lego DC Super-Villains via the "Justice League Dark" DLC pack.
- Zatanna appears in DC Super Hero Girls: Teen Power, voiced again by Kari Wahlgren.

=== Miscellaneous ===
- Zatanna appears in Gotham Girls, voiced by Stacie Randall.
- A teenage Zatanna appears in the Zatanna: Trial of the Crystal Wand segment of Cartoon Monsoon, voiced by Tara Strong. This version takes inspiration from Sabrina, the Teenage Witch and Buffy Summers and has an older brother named Damon.
- The Smallville incarnation of Zatanna appears in Smallville: Harbinger.
- The Injustice incarnation of Zatanna appears in the Injustice: Gods Among Us prequel comic.
- The DC Super Hero Girls incarnation of Zatanna appears in the franchise's tie-in novel Spaced Out.

== Collected editions ==
Title	Material collected	Pages	Publication date	ISBN
Other collections
JLA: Zatanna's Search	The Atom #19, Hawkman #4, Green Lantern #42, Detective Comics #335 and #355, Justice League of America #51	128	February 2004	978-1401201883
Black Canary and Zatanna: Bloodspell	Black Canary and Zatanna	144	June 2015	978-1401201883
Zatanna: Bring Down The House	Zatanna: Bring Down The House #1-5	176	March 2025	978-1799500803
Volume 2 (2010–2011)
Zatanna: The Mistress of Magic	Zatanna #1–6	144	March 2011	978-1401230074
Zatanna: Shades of the Past	Zatanna #7–12	232	November 2011	978-1401233006
Zatanna by Paul Dini	Zatanna #1–16, Zatanna: Everyday Magic, DC Universe Rebirth Holiday Special, DC Infinite Halloween Special	440	March 2017	978 1779525833
Graphic novels
Zatanna and the House of Secrets	All chapters 1–6	160	February 2020	978-1401290702
Zatanna: The Jewel of Gravesend	All chapters 1–8	200	July 2022	978-1401296384
Webtoon
Zatanna & The Ripper Vol. 1	Zatanna & The Ripper original material	200	October 2023	978-1401201883
Zatanna & The Ripper Vol. 2	Zatanna & The Ripper original material	200	December 2023	978 1779522962
Zatanna & The Ripper Vol. 3	Zatanna & The Ripper original material	208	May 2024	978-1779526953
Zatanna & The Ripper Vol. 4	Zatanna & The Ripper original material	208	September 2024	978-1779528179
