= Seven Soldiers =

2005–2006 comic book series published by DC Comics

- Cover to Seven Soldiers of Victory Vol. 4 (2007, TPB), art by Doug Mahnke

Publication information
- Publisher: DC Comics
- Schedule: Monthly
Title(s)
Seven Soldiers #0–1
Seven Soldiers: The Bulleteer #1–4
Seven Soldiers: Frankenstein #1–4
Seven Soldiers: The Guardian #1–4
Seven Soldiers: Klarion the Witch Boy #1–4
Seven Soldiers: Mister Miracle #1–4
Seven Soldiers: Shining Knight #1–4
Seven Soldiers: Zatanna #1–4
- Formats: Original material for the series has been published as a set of limited series.
- Genre: Superhero
- Publication date: April 2005 – December 2006
- Number of issues: 30
- Main character(s): Shining Knight; Manhattan Guardian; Zatanna; Klarion the Witch Boy; Mister Miracle; Bulleteer; Frankenstein; Sheeda

Creative team
- Writer(s): Grant Morrison
- Artist(s): J. H. Williams III; Simone Bianchi; Cameron Stewart; Ryan Sook; Frazer Irving; Pascal Ferry; Yanick Paquette; Doug Mahnke; Freddie Williams II

Reprints
- Collected editions
- Volume 1: ISBN 1-4012-0925-4
- Volume 2: ISBN 1401209750
- Volume 3: ISBN 1401209769
- Volume 4: ISBN 1401209777

Seven Soldiers is a 2005–2006 comic book metaseries written by Grant Morrison and published by DC Comics. It was published as seven interrelated mini-series and two bookend issues. The series features a new version of the Seven Soldiers of Victory fighting to save Earth from the Sheeda. The series has been interpreted as "an extended metafictional treatise on the writing and reading of comic books in general and the superhero genre in particular".

== Publication history ==
Seven Soldiers started off as a different project which evolved over time. According to Morrison:

I started off in 2002 with the idea to do a JLA spin-off called JL8, which featured a bunch of C-list characters getting together as a DC analogue of the Avengers or Ultimates. Guardian was in from the start as my Captain America guy, Mister Miracle was Thor, the Demon was the Hulk, Zatanna was the Scarlet Witch and so on.... I worked on the material for the next two years to turn it into the Seven Soldiers concept as it finally emerged.

The metaseries is bookended by Seven Soldiers #0 and #1, with art by J. H. Williams III. The rest was made up of seven mini-series: Shining Knight with art by Simone Bianchi, Manhattan Guardian with art by Cameron Stewart, Zatanna with art by Ryan Sook, Klarion with art by Frazer Irving, Mister Miracle with art by Pascal Ferry and Freddie Williams II, Bulleteer with art by Yanick Paquette, and Frankenstein with art by Doug Mahnke.

== Plot summary ==
In the first issue of this story (which was part of a two-issue framework for the project), the Vigilante gathers together a new Spider (called "I, Spyder" and apparently the son of the original), Gimmix (the estranged daughter of Merry, the Girl of a Thousand Gimmicks), a new Boy Blue, Dyno-Mite Dan (owner of two "working fakes" imitations of the explosive rings of T.N.T. and Dan the Dyna-Mite), and the Whip (granddaughter of the Golden Age Whip). The team sets out to battle the Buffalo Spider (later on, the Sheeda are betrayed by Spyder in Seven Soldiers of Victory #1 in another nod to the original), only to be killed during an event known as the Harrowing.

The seven miniseries follow seven other characters with indirect connections to the first group, each with their own art styles, genres, and character arcs. A central part of Morrison's idea for the current series is that, although the seven characters in question are each a part of the same struggle, they never actually meet (although there are references to each other in the various titles). Thus, the team is actually not a team.

An explanation for this is presented in Manhattan Guardian and Zatanna. In the first, a man named Ed Starsgard (Baby Brain) tells Guardian that the Sheeda have been attacking humanity in periodic waves, taking everything of value (physical and mental) and leaving behind just enough for the survivors to rebuild for next time. It is prophesied that the Sheeda will eventually be stopped by seven soldiers, so they target teams of seven, including the Ultramarine Corps and the Justice League of America (JLA: Classified #1–3). However, because the Seven Soldiers have never met, they stand a chance of doing the job.

In Zatanna, a ghost remarks that there are too many coincidences in the story and it feels like there is a "mystery string tying it all together". It eventually emerges that the Seven Unknown Men of Slaughter Swamp are driving the Seven Soldiers to stop the Sheeda.

In an interview, Morrison remarked that this series of stories (which he calls a "megaseries", also known as a metaseries), takes place after Infinite Crisis. After careful consultation with Morrison, Dan DiDio decided that the series instead takes place a week before the events of Infinite Crisis.

The comic Seven Soldiers of Victory #1 was originally scheduled for release on April 1, 2006, but was delayed and eventually released on October 25.

=== The last battle ===
After undergoing various trials and tribulations in their own miniseries, the soldiers eventually take part in the climactic battle against the Queen of the Sheeda in New York, each affecting different parts of the battle without having any idea of the larger picture.

The climactic sequence is initiated by Zatanna casting a spell: "Seven Soldiers Strike!" This is the final push the universe required to move the soldiers into position.

After travelling into the future kingdom where the Sheeda live, Frankenstein takes Castle Revolving, the Queen's time-travelling floating kingdom, to present-day New York so that the Queen can be brought to justice by the paranormal special ops group S.H.A.D.E. Once Castle Revolving arrives, the Shining Knight—who had chased the queen to the future—successfully attacks the Queen, severely injuring her and leaving her open to an attack by supporting character I, Spyder, who shoots an arrow into her and knocks her down to the New York streets below.

There, the Manhattan Guardian has rounded up thousands of New Yorkers into a militia that is successfully fighting off the Sheeda invasion. At approximately the same time, Bulleteer comes tearing down the street in her car, hoping to take her critically ill nemesis, Sally Sonic, to a hospital. Sally, utterly insane, attacks Bulleteer, who loses control of her vehicle and crashes into the Queen. Guardian arrives on the scene, but Bulleteer is the only survivor.

Prior to all of this, Klarion, who had drilled up into New York from hidden caves beneath the city, had stolen a magic die from Misty, Zatanna's sidekick. Together with his own die, the two dice comprise Fatherbox, one of the lost treasures of the ancient superhero Aurakles. Klarion had then traveled up to Castle Revolving. With the Sheeda Queen dead, Klarion uses a binding spell on Frankenstein, forcing him to pilot the ship back into the future. Thus, Klarion becomes the "traitor" that was prophesied. However, by doing so, he also stopped Misty, the Sheeda princess, from becoming the new Queen and being obligated to continue the cycle of destruction to save her people.

Finally, Mister Miracle confronts Dark Side in his club. There, Dark Side explains that he gave Earth to the Sheeda in return for them giving him Aurakles, the primordial superhero. Mister Miracle offers himself in exchange for Aurakles' freedom and Dark Side accepts. Once Aurakles is freed and Mister Miracle is shackled, Dark Side shoots him through the head, thus making him the soldier that was prophesied to die. Mister Miracle is later seen emerging alive from his own grave, "escaping death".

=== Character endings ===
- Shining Knight is shown attending the H.S. Johnson School for Heroes, where Ali Ka-Zoom (Zatanna's ghostly friend) promises that he will give her the advice she needs, and that she can continue to fight evil with Horsefeathers on weekends. He gives her Aurakles' sword and hints that she may yet return to her period of time and become Queen Ystina the Good.
- Guardian survives the attack on New York, after raising an army to fight off the Sheeda. He wins back the heart of his estranged girlfriend (to whom he had previously proposed).
- Bulleteer is briefly arrested after the accident, but later told that she is free to go. Although she questions if she really is free, because she played right into what destiny had in store for her.
- Klarion is shown cackling madly as Sheeda women crawl at his heels. He reappears in Countdown to Final Crisis where he attempts to absorb Mary Marvel's powers only to be defeated.
- Frankenstein is last seen under the control of Klarion, although he still seems to have retained his mind. He is then shown in Final Crisis #3 assisting S.H.A.D.E. in capturing Renee Montoya.
- Zatanna is almost run over by Guardian's wife and subsequently vanishes. The most famous of the soldiers, she survives, appearing in stories set "One Year Later", though her newly acquired apprentice Misty Kilgore has yet to appear.
- Mister Miracle is buried in a grave engraved only with his stage name. It is visited by Dark Side, who deposits a black flower on the grave and leaves. Once he is gone, however, Mister Miracle's hands burst out of the ground. He has since turned up in Final Crisis #2, having escaped death. His escape from the grave is mentioned.

== Members ==
=== First group ===
- Vigilante (Greg Saunders)
- I, Spyder (Thomas Ludlow Dalt II)
- Gimmix (Jacqueline Pemberton)
- Boy Blue
- Dyno-Mite Dan (Harris D. Ledbetter)
- The Whip (Shelly Gaynor)
- Bulleteer (dropped out before the group went on its first mission)

=== Second group ===
- Shining Knight (Sir Ystin/Ystina/Justina)
- Manhattan Guardian (Jake Jordan)
- Zatanna (Zatanna Zatara)
- Klarion the Witch Boy (Klarion Bleak)
- Mister Miracle (Shilo Norman)
- Bulleteer (Alix Harrower)
- Frankenstein

== Awards ==
The series won the 2006 Eisner Award for "Best Finite/Limited Series".

== Collected editions ==
The series has been collected into four trade paperbacks:

#	Title	Publisher	Year	ISBN	Reprints
1	Volume 1	DC Comics	2006	ISBN 1-4012-0925-4	Collects The reprinted material is, in whole or in part, from: Seven Soldiers #0; Shining Knight #1–2; The Guardian #1–2; Zatanna #1–2; Klarion #1
1	Credits and full notes: Writer(s) / Grant Morrison; Penciller(s) / J. H. Williams III; Simone Bianchi; Cameron Stewart; Ryan Sook; Frazer Irving; A British edition was published by Titan Books (ISBN 1-8457-6236-3)				Collects The reprinted material is, in whole or in part, from: Seven Soldiers #0; Shining Knight #1–2; The Guardian #1–2; Zatanna #1–2; Klarion #1
2	Volume 2	DC Comics	2007	ISBN 1-4012-0975-0	Collects The reprinted material is, in whole or in part, from: Klarion #2–3; Shining Knight #3–4; The Guardian #3–4; Zatanna #3
2	Credits and full notes: Writer(s) / Grant Morrison; Penciller(s) / Frazer Irving; Simone Bianchi; Cameron Stewart; Ryan Sook; A British edition was published by Titan Books (ISBN 1-8457-6237-1)				Collects The reprinted material is, in whole or in part, from: Klarion #2–3; Shining Knight #3–4; The Guardian #3–4; Zatanna #3
3	Volume 3	DC Comics	2006	ISBN 1-4012-0976-9	Collects The reprinted material is, in whole or in part, from: Mister Miracle #1–2; Zatanna #4; Klarion #4; Bulleteer #1–2; Frankenstein #1
3	Credits and full notes: Writer(s) / Grant Morrison; Penciller(s) / Pascal Ferry; Ryan Sook; Frazer Irving; Yanick Paquette; Doug Mahnke; A British edition was published by Titan Books (ISBN 1-8457-6288-6)				Collects The reprinted material is, in whole or in part, from: Mister Miracle #1–2; Zatanna #4; Klarion #4; Bulleteer #1–2; Frankenstein #1
4	Volume 4	DC Comics	2007	ISBN 1-4012-0977-7	Collects The reprinted material is, in whole or in part, from: Frankenstein #2–4; Mister Miracle #3–4; Bulleteer #3–4; Seven Soldiers #1
4	Credits and full notes: Writer(s) / Grant Morrison; Penciller(s) / Doug Mahnke; Pascal Ferry; Yanick Paquette; J. H. Williams III; A British edition was published by Titan Books (ISBN 1-8457-6294-0)				Collects The reprinted material is, in whole or in part, from: Frankenstein #2–4; Mister Miracle #3–4; Bulleteer #3–4; Seven Soldiers #1

Note: The full title of all volumes listed here start with "Seven Soldiers of Victory: ".

In 2010-11, the series was collected into two hardcover volumes, the first of which contains the same content as the first two trade paperbacks, while the second contains the same content as the latter two paperbacks. In 2018, all thirty issues were compiled into a single, 792-page omnibus.
