= Frankenstein (DC Comics) =

DC Comics character

- Frankenstein, as he appeared on the cover of Seven Soldiers: Frankenstein #2 (March 2006). Art by Doug Mahnke.

Publication information
- Publisher: DC Comics
- First appearance: Detective Comics #135 (May 1948)
- Created by: Edmond Hamilton; Bob Kane

In-story information
- Full name: Frankenstein
- Team affiliations: Creature Commandos; Seven Soldiers; S.H.A.D.E. Justice League Dark; Justice League
- Abilities: Superhuman strength; Immortality

Frankenstein is a fictional character appearing in American comic books published by DC Comics. He is based on the Frankenstein's monster character created by Mary Shelley.

Eric Frankenstein is played by David Harbour in the DC Universe, beginning with the animated series Creature Commandos.

== Publication history ==
Frankenstein, based upon Mary Shelley's character from the novel Frankenstein; or, the Modern Prometheus (1818), was created in 1948 by Edmond Hamilton and Bob Kane in Detective Comics #135.

A later reworking was developed by Len Wein as the Spawn of Frankenstein concept. The monster fell under the thrall of Count Dracula. They often battled against Superman, Batman, or the Phantom Stranger. He appeared in The Phantom Stranger (vol. 2) #23-30 (February 1973-May 1974), Action Comics #531 (May 1982), and The Young All-Stars #18-19 (November–December 1988).

A third Frankenstein Monster appears in Superman #344 (February 1980), along with Count Dracula. These both come from "The World of Nightmare" and battle Superman, the Phantom Stranger, and Cassandra Craft.

Frankenstein's latest revamping was created by Grant Morrison and Doug Mahnke in 2005 and is similar to Doc Frankenstein. He is one of the Seven Soldiers, and bears a resemblance to the creature as portrayed by Boris Karloff in the 1931 film directed by James Whale.

== Fictional character biography ==
Frankenstein is an undead body composed of parts from several corpses stitched together, created by Victor Frankenstein some time in the 19th century. He was assumed dead in the Arctic when he sank beneath the ice, but he survived and swam to America, having "many adventures". He was revived by Victor Adam. Frankenstein vowed vengeance against Adam for restoring him to life, successfully killing him, but accidentally bringing about a coma for Doctor Thirteen's wife Maria in the process. In particular, Frankenstein became a frequent enemy of Melmoth, whom he referred to as the Ringmaster of the Circus of Maggots. In a climactic battle in 1870, Frankenstein faced Melmoth and stopped him from destroying a town with maggot-hominids. The fight took place on a moving train, which was derailed during the conflict, and Frankenstein's fate was unknown.

In 2005, a high school student, called 'Uglyhead' by all the other children, acquires telepathic abilities through contact with the Sheeda, which he uses to torment his peers. At the senior prom, the now-docile students are killed by the Sheeda maggot-hominids. This causes the return of Frankenstein, who had survived in a state of hibernation underneath the town, who makes short work of the maggot-hominids and the boy, before burning down the school to cover the bodies. Afterwards, Frankenstein tracks down Melmoth and makes his way to Mars. On Mars, Frankenstein confronts Melmoth once again. Frankenstein frees the children Melmoth has enslaved to work in his gold mines, and feeds Melmoth to the flesh-eating, praying mantis-like horses of Mars. Before he is consumed, Melmoth reveals that it was not lightning that brought the monster to life, but several drops of his own immortal blood, sold to Frankenstein's creator, that still course through Frankenstein's veins.

In the third issue of the series, Frankenstein meets an old acquaintance greatly resembling the "Bride" in Bride of Frankenstein, albeit with two extra arms grafted onto her by the Red Swami, a supervillain who brainwashed her into thinking she was the reincarnation of an assassin goddess. She is now an agent of the Super Human Advanced Defense Executive (S.H.A.D.E.), a secret government agency, which temporarily drafts Frankenstein as well. Of their previous relationship, she says "It's nothing personal, but you were never my type".

In the final issue, he stows away on a time-ship which brings him to the Sheeda realm in the distant future. There, he destroys their world-destroying fleet, kills the Sheeda-Queen's time-yacht's steersman, and hijacks her ship to the present. Once in the present, though, Klarion the Witch Boy gains control of Frankenstein using a witch-brand and forces him to take the castle back to the future.

He appears briefly in Infinite Crisis #7, which takes place one week after the Frankenstein miniseries. He is seen fighting against General Wade Eiling. Frankenstein is armed with a three-foot-long sword, which he claims once belonged to the Archangel Michael, and a large antique pistol, which he calls his 'steam-gun'.

A character called Young Frankenstein has appeared in Teen Titans as a member of the team during the "Lost Year" covered by 52. Young Frankenstein is apparently killed by Black Adam during World War III, but actually survives. (Note: As shown in the Infinite Halloween Special and Countdown to Mystery #2)

Frankenstein and S.H.A.D.E appear in Final Crisis #3, also written by Grant Morrison. He again appears two issues later, leading a squad of superheroes against Darkseid's forces, who are led by Kalibak. He is also seen in the final issue fighting in humanity's last stand before Superman gets the Miracle Machine working. Frankenstein is immune to Darkseid's weapon, the Anti-Life Equation, because he is already dead.

Frankenstein confronts Solomon Grundy in the latter's current limited series, and again during the Blackest Night. Grundy, having been transformed into a Black Lantern, rips out Frankenstein's heart. Due to having an extra one in his chest, Frankenstein survives this attack.

A version of the character appears in a spinoff of the 2011 alternate-timeline crossover event Flashpoint. The three-issue series was titled Flashpoint: Frankenstein & the Creatures of the Unknown.

As part of The New 52 (a 2011 reboot of the DC Comics universe), a new ongoing series Frankenstein, Agent of S.H.A.D.E. was released, based on the Seven Soldiers version of Frankenstein. It was initially written by Jeff Lemire and drawn by Alberto Ponticelli. Matt Kindt replaced Lemire with issue #10 and stayed with the book until it was cancelled with issue #16. The character later joins the Justice League Dark.

The character appears next in seven issues of both the New 52 Batman and Robin and the DC Rebirth Superman, both written by Peter Tomasi and drawn by Patrick Gleason. Later in 2018, the Seven Soldiers briefly reunite in Sideways, then in 2019 Frankenstein forms a team of fellow monsters to once again stop Melmoth in Gotham City Monsters. His DC Rebirth history with the Bride revealed that they had a son that went homicidal and their relationship was strained when Frankenstein was forced to kill it. In the present, Father Time of S.H.A.D.E. reanimated the Spawn of Frankenstein and it was traced to Castle Frankenstein by Frankenstein and Bride of Frankenstein. As it begged for death, the Bride put her child out of his misery and left S.H.A.D.E. afterwards.

== Powers and abilities ==
Frankenstein is undead, composed of assorted body parts taken from dozens of different sources. Frankenstein has superhuman strength, does not need to eat or sleep, and is functionally immortal. He has mental access to the S.H.A.D.E. database via a surgical implant. Because of his undead nature, Frankenstein can replace damaged or missing limbs with grafts taken from individuals of similar build and adapt it to his unique physiology.

== Other versions ==
=== Earth-276 ===
An alternate universe version of Frankenstein appears in Superman #276 as a member of the Monster League of Evil.

=== Earth-Two ===
Professor Carter Nichols sent Batman and Robin back in time to the 19th Century where they contended with Victor Frankenstein and his reanimated giant servant Ivan. After Ivan killed himself and Victor Frankenstein's cousin Count Mettern, Mary Shelley visited the area and used the information of what transpired to write her novel Frankenstein.

=== Earth-S ===
On Earth-S, Kid Eternity summoned Frankenstein's Monster, among other literary characters, to deal with the Mackey Musclers.

=== Flashpoint ===
An alternate timeline version of Frankenstein appears in Flashpoint: Frankenstein and the Creatures of the Unknown. This version is the leader of the Creature Commandos who saved Lt. Matthew Shrieve following his awakening during World War II. After being recruited by Project M to join the Creature Commandos, Frankenstein led them in defeating Nazi forces and personally killed Adolf Hitler. After the end of the war, Project M was shut down and the Commandos were captured and placed in stasis. Nonetheless, they would be revived and escape to discover their origins before Frankenstein leaves the group to join his Bride and Matthew's granddaughter Miranda in participating in the Atlantean/Amazon war.

== In other media ==
=== Television ===
- Frankenstein appears in the Challenge of the Superfriends episode "The Rise and Fall of the Superfriends", voiced by Vic Perrin.
- Frankenstein appears in The World's Greatest Super Friends episode "The Super Friends Meet Frankenstein", voiced by Stanley Ralph Ross. This version was created by Dr. Frankenstein, the great-great-grandson of Victor Frankenstein.
- Frankenstein appears in Teen Titans Go!.
- Eric Frankenstein appears in Creature Commandos, voiced by David Harbour. This version displays an obsessive attraction towards the Bride, having murdered Victor Frankenstein and pursued her across the world for two centuries despite her continuously rejecting him.

=== Video games ===
- Frankenstein appears as a playable character in Lego Batman 3: Beyond Gotham, voiced by Fred Tatasciore.
- Frankenstein appears as an unlockable playable character in Lego DC Super-Villains.

== Collected editions ==
Title	Material collected	Published date	ISBN
Showcase Presents: Phantom Stranger Vol. 2	Frankenstein stories from Phantom Stranger (vol. 2) #22-30 and Phantom Stranger (vol. 2) #22-41, DC Super-Stars #18, House of Secrets #150, Justice League of America #103, The Brave and the Bold #89, 98	March 2008	978-1401217228
Seven Soldiers of Victory Vol. 3	Seven Soldiers: Frankenstein #1 and Seven Soldiers: Mister Miracle #1-2, Seven Soldiers: Zatanna #4, Seven Soldiers: Klarion the Witchboy #4, Seven Soldiers: Bulleteer #1-2	August 2006	978-1401209766
Seven Soldiers of Victory Vol. 4	Seven Soldiers: Frankenstein #2-4 and Seven Soldiers: Mister Miracle #3-4, Seven Soldiers: Bulleteer #3-4, and Seven Soldiers of Victory #1.	January 2007	978-1401209773
Seven Soldiers of Victory: Book Two	Seven Soldiers: Frankenstein #1-4 and Seven Soldiers: Mister Miracle #1-4, Seven Soldiers: Bulleteer #1-4, Seven Soldiers: Zatanna #4, Seven Soldiers: Klarion #4, Seven Soldiers of Victory #1	March 2011	978-1401229634
Flashpoint: The World of Flashpoint Featuring Green Lantern	Flashpoint: Frankenstein and the Creatures of the Unknown #1-3 and Flashpoint: Hal Jordan #1-3, Flashpoint: Abin Sur #1-3, Flashpoint: Green Arrow Industries #1.	March 2012	978-1401234065
Frankenstein, Agent of S.H.A.D.E. Vol. 1: War of the Monsters	Frankenstein, Agent of S.H.A.D.E. #1-7	June 2012	978-1401234713
Frankenstein, Agent of S.H.A.D.E. Vol. 2: Secrets of the Dead	Frankenstein, Agent of S.H.A.D.E. #0, 8-16	April 2013	978-1401238186
