= Sheeda =

Fictional race in DC Comics

- One Sheeda as seen in Seven Soldiers of Victory #0 (April 2005).

Publication information
- Publisher: DC Comics
- First appearance: Seven Soldiers #0 (April 2005)
- Created by: Grant Morrison (writer); J.H. Williams III (artist)

Characteristics
- Place of origin: Earth
- Notable members: Gloriana Tenebrae; Melmoth; Neh-Buh-Loh; Misty Kilgore

The Sheeda is a fictional race created in comics published by DC Comics. They first appear in Seven Soldiers #0 (April 2005), and were created by Grant Morrison and J.H. Williams III. Their first DC Universe appearance was in Morrison's introductory run on the JLA: Classified series in 2004.

== History ==
The Sheeda are a blue-skinned species originating from Earth roughly one billion years in the future. Earth now orbits a dying sun, and mismanagement of the planet by the Sheeda has reduced it to a wasteland. Sheeda are masters of both science and magic, existing in a variety of sizes. The smallest Sheeda can control the bodies of others by attaching to the back of their neck.

Using their technology, they travel back through time, come to a certain era, and lay waste to other civilizations, taking their resources and enslaving most of the populace. In an interview with Comicon.com, Grant Morrison stated the following:

"[These soldiers] are recruited into an apocalyptic battle with some ancient Enemies of Humanity, a race of beings called the Sheeda, who are familiar to us from folk tale and legend as 'the Unseelie Court', or the people of 'Faerie' among many other names. Periodically, these Sheeda arrive like locusts in their millions in huge floating 'Castles' they use to 'harvest' civilizations which have reached their peak. The Sheeda ransack these cultures and take away their treasures, their achievements, their learning to enrich their own burned-out culture".
"The name is from the Irish Sidhe, pronounced 'Shee', as in banshee. The Sidhe were the Fairy Folk, the strange ones from the hills who haunt the old legends of so many cultures. I had a wild idea about what these legends might REALLY be describing and realized I'd found the perfect villains for this story. I based my portrayal of the Sheeda civilization itself on a dark, inverted Goth image of Queen Elizabeth 1's England. They're very evil, decadent and corrupt but as I say we don't reveal their TRUE nature and who they really are until later in the series. In FRANKENSTEIN! issue 4 in fact, 'Frankenstein vs. Fairyland'".

The Sheeda are tied to Seven Imperishable Treasures, based on Celtic myth's Four Treasures, such as the Foundation Stone of Manhattan (Lia Fáil), the Hammer of Bors (Mjolnir), the Cauldron of Rebirth, the Gwydion (a homunculus made of 'living language', based on Merlin) and the sword Excalibur (possibly the counterpart of the sword of Nuada). Seven Soldiers of Victory #1 lists the seven treasures as Gwydion the Merlin, the Undry Cauldron (Dagda's Cauldron), Pegasus, Excalibur, a Father Box, the Hammer, and the Spear whose name is both love and vengeance (the progeny of Aurakles).

In the representation of Sheeda's language depicted in Shining Knight #4, Morrison used the Ogham alphabet.

== Sheeda characters ==
- Melmoth is the former king of the Sheeda. His throne was usurped by his wife and he was sent back in time to the first fall of Camelot, where he assumed the role of Mordredd the Undead. Desperate, he found the Cauldron of Rebirth, achieved immortality, and has been plotting revenge ever since. Melmoth was killed by Frankenstein.
- Gloriana Tenebrae, Melmoth's second wife and Queen of the Sheeda, seeks to retrieve the Seven treasures before the Harrowing. She is apparently the basis of the evil queen in the "Snow White" legend, since she has made several references to wanting to be "the fairest of them all". Gloriana is killed after being injured by Shining Knight and I, Spyder, then crushed by the Bulleteer's car.
- Neh-Buh-Loh, whose official title is Celestial Huntsman, is a sentient universe taking a humanoid form who serves Gloriana. He is also known as Nebula Man - a being who battled the original Seven Soldiers of Victory.
- Misty Kilgore, a young girl currently in the care of Zatanna, is Melmoth's child by his first wife. Using her "magic die", Misty can use magic similar to Zatanna's. Her name among the Sheeda is "Arriachnon" or "Rhiannon", which is the name of a traditional Celtic goddess.
- The people of Limbo Town, including Klarion the Witch Boy, are all Sheeda-descended half-breeds.

=== Allies ===
- The Terrible Time Tailor: The Tailor is the rogue eighth "Time Tailor", from a race of beings who weave history and the future. He is also known as Zor, a twisted magician and former enemy of the Spectre. Zor decided to cause mischief in setting the scene for the Sheeda to launch the Harrowing, but is ultimately defeated by Zatanna, and given over to the other Time Tailors. Zor is forced to take on the life of Cyrus Gold just before Gold was lynched by an angry mob.
- Darkseid: Darkseid is an incredibly powerful evil New God who seeks the Anti-Life Equation, which can dominate a person's mind by showing them that life, hope, and freedom are meaningless. He granted permission for the Sheeda to harrow Earth in exchange for giving him Aurakles.
