= Doctor Fate =

DC Comics superhero

- An image of Kent Nelson as Doctor Fate in Blue Beetle (2016) #9. Art by Scott Kolins.

Publication information
- Publisher: DC Comics
- First appearance: More Fun Comics #55 (May 1940)
- Created by: Gardner Fox (writer); Howard Sherman (artist)

In-story information
- Alter ego: Dr. Kent Nelson, Ph.D.
- Species: Metahuman
- Team affiliations: Lords of Order; Justice Society of America; Justice Society Dark; Justice League Dark; Justice League; Justice League International; All-Star Squadron
- Partnerships: Nabu; Shat-Ru; Doctor Fate (Inza Cramer); Doctor Fate (Khalid Nassour); Salem the Witch Girl
- Supporting character of: Blue Beetle (Jaime Reyes); Doctor Fate (Khalid Nassour)
- Notable aliases: Fate, Immortal Doctor Fate, Ageless Archmage, Golden Age Doctor Fate
- Abilities: List: Mystically enhanced physiology which grants: Immortality; Telepathy; Telekinesis; Peak human condition; Innate supernatural knowledge; Expert in archaeology.; Genius-level intellect.; Skilled hand-to-hand combatant; Via Helmet of Fate; Magical manipulation and spell-casting; Mystic augmentation; Cosmic awareness; Clairvoyance; Chronokinesis; Ectokinesis; Necromancy; Reality manipulation; Elemental control; Weather control; Superhuman strength; Superhuman durability; Bio-fission; Teleportation; Dimensional travel; Probability manipulation; Precognition

Altered in-story information for adaptations to other media
- Notable aliases: Earth's Sorcerer Supreme

Doctor Fate (also known as Fate) is a superhero who appears in American comic books published by DC Comics. Created by Gardner Fox and Howard Sherman, the character first appeared in More Fun Comics #55 (May, 1940) during the Golden Age of Comic Books. Since his creation, several other characters have served as successor incarnations of the character within the mainstream DC Universe as legacy heroes, with each new version attempting to reinvigorate the character for contemporary audiences.

The original version is archaeologist Kent Nelson, whose encounter with Nabu, a cosmic being affiliated with the Lords of Order, transformed him into the sorcerous superhero, Doctor Fate, by granting him the famous Helmet of Fate. First training him out of pity of Kent following father's death during an excavation, various retellings reconceptualize Nabu's intents and method of training. As Doctor Fate, Kent became a founding member of the Justice Society of America and served in other superhero teams like the Justice League International. As the original (sometimes referred to as Golden Age Doctor Fate), Kent's most reoccurring conflict is his gradual loss of personal agency to Nabu and its effects on his interpersonal relationships, especially with his love interest, Inza Cramer. Since the 1980s, the original version has been subjected to various comic book deaths, with several other successors taking the role at times and Kent either eventually returning to the role in after revivals, making posthumous appearances in storylines, or being in supporting roles to other versions. After being killed off in a 2019 Justice League Dark storyline, he is permanently succeeded by the modern incarnation, Egyptian-American and medical practitioner Khalid Nassour.

While not reaching the same levels of cultural recognition as Batman, Superman, or Wonder Woman, Doctor Fate remains as one of DC Comic's most enduring and long-standing characters, known for their distinctive name and design. Being one of the earliest heroes created by DC Comics, the original's Immortal Doctor Fate remain as one of the character's most popular runs. However, creators and critics alike have been critical of aspects of the characters, including elements of orientalism, Nabu's characterization in regards to Nelson's agency, and the character's immense powers posing challenges in creating credible adversaries. Despite this, the original Doctor Fate has made many appearances in adaptations. Nelson first made his live-action debut in the television series Smallville, portrayed by Brent Stait. He also appears in the DC Extended Universe film Black Adam (2022), portrayed by Pierce Brosnan. The character appeared in the DC Animated Universe, voiced by George DelHoyo in the Superman: The Animated Series and Oded Fehr in Justice League and Justice League Unlimited. Several alternate versions of the character have also been adapted in media, including original creations and those based on other published DC Comics characters.

== Creation ==
In a 1987 interview, Fox recalled the genesis behind Fate, stating, "Doctor Fate (I originally called him Doctor Droon, but the name was editorially changed) was one of my favorites. I created him and even sketched out the original costume he would wear – but that costume was changed by artists over the years, for one reason or another. To my knowledge, I wrote all the Dr. Fate yarns that appeared, up until 1968, when I left comic book writing to a great degree. I always liked the supernatural; I read Lovecraft, Derleth, Sax Rohmer, Howard, Clark Ashton Smith, Whitehead, all the others, Fate was a derivation from my imagination influenced by those writings"

== Publication history ==
=== Golden, Silver, and Bronze Age of Comics (1940–1985) ===
Cover to More Fun Comics #61 (November 1940), showing Kent Nelson as Doctor Fate. Cover art by Howard Sherman.

The original version of the character, Kent Nelson, first appeared in a self-titled six-page strip in More Fun Comics No. 55 (May 1940), during the Golden Age of Comic Books, created by writer Gardner Fox and artist Howard Sherman, who produced the first three years of monthly Doctor Fate stories. Soon after, the character's origin was shown in More Fun Comics No. 67 (May 1941). Stories during the Golden Age included his love interest, Inza, who was known variably throughout the Golden Age as Inza Cramer, Inza Sanders, and Inza Carmer. When the Justice Society of America (JSA) was created for All Star Comics No. 3 (Winter 1940), Doctor Fate was one of the characters National Comics used for the joint venture with All-American Publications. He made his last appearance in that book in issue No. 21 (Summer 1944), virtually simultaneously with the end of his own strip in More Fun Comics No. 98 (July–August 1944).

The character later appeared in book such as the annual JSA/Justice League of America (JLA) team-ups in Justice League of America that began in 1963; in World's Finest Comics No. 201 (March 1971 and No. 208, December 1971); an appearance with Batman in The Brave and the Bold No. 156 (November 1979); and a solo story in 1st Issue Special No. 9 (December 1975), written by Martin Pasko and drawn by Walt Simonson. Doctor Fate and the rest of the JSA returned to All-Star Comics in 1976 in issue No. 58, beginning a two-year run that ended with issue No. 74 and Adventure Comics #461–462 in 1978. Adventure Comics No. 466 related the untold tale of the Justice Society's 1951 disbanding. During this period, Inza Cramer's name as such was amended.

During the Bronze Age, the character's origin was retold in DC Special Series No. 10, and Doctor Fate again teamed up with Superman in DC Comics Presents No. 23 (July 1980). He later featured in a series of back-up stories running in The Flash from No. 306 (February 1982) to No. 313 (September 1982) written by Martin Pasko (aided by Steve Gerber from No. 310 to No. 313) and drawn by Keith Giffen. In 1981, DC's All-Star Squadron elaborated upon the adventures of many World War II-era heroes, including Doctor Fate and the JSA. Doctor Fate made occasional modern-day appearances in Infinity, Inc. throughout 1984, the same year which witnessed the 22nd and final annual JSA/JLA team-up. In 1985, DC collected the Doctor Fate back-up stories from The Flash, a retelling of Doctor Fate's origin by Paul Levitz, Joe Staton, and Michael Nasser originally published in Secret Origins of Super-Heroes (January 1978) (DC Special Series No. 10 in the indicia), the Pasko/Simonson Doctor Fate story from 1st Issue Special No. 9, and a Doctor Fate tale from More Fun Comics No. 56 (June 1940), in a three-issue limited series titled The Immortal Doctor Fate.Doctor Fate later appeared in several issues of Crisis on Infinite Earths, joining various heroes from the DC Multiverse in battle against the Anti-Monitor and, later, Amethyst. Despite the significant alterations to various histories resulting from the crisis, much of Kent Nelson's personal history remained largely unaffected, although some of the character's earlier stories during the Golden Age were retconned out.

=== Modern Age (1985–2011) ===
In 1987, the Doctor Fate limited series was released, featuring the debut of Eric and Linda Strauss. The characters would replace Kent Nelson, who is killed off in this series, as Doctor Fate. A subsequent ongoing series focusing on Eric and Linda followed in the winter of 1988, with the first 24 issues written by J.M. DeMatteis and drawn by Shawn McManus. The series' premise featured the pair under the guidance of Nabu, who had inhabited Kent Nelson's body and taken his identity. The series also established a supporting cast for the characters and the concept of Kali Yuga among the Lords of Chaos and Order, a period where chaos reigns and order is defeated. It further established that the incarnations of Fate are the result of reincarnation cycles. During DeMatteis's run, the series experienced limited sales. Doctor Fate would also appear in several other crossovers and miniseries at the time, including Millennium and Cosmic Odyssey. Both characters are killed off halfway into the series, replaced by resurrected Inza and Kent Nelson from issue No. 25 onward in 1991. The series ended with issue No. 41, and following Zero Hour, both Kent and Inza were killed off.

Fate No. 1 (November 1994) featuring Jared Stevens. Cover art by Anthony Williams and Andy Lanning.

A new incarnation, Jared Stevens, was introduced in a series called Fate, launched in the wake of Zero Hour in 1994. The Doctor Fate character went through a radical redesign, dropping the "Doctor" title and gaining new weapons made from the previous related artifacts of Doctor Fate. Unlike prior depictions of the Doctor Fate character as a sorcerer, the character was instead a demon hunter. Considered an unpopular reimagining of the character, the series was canceled after 23 issues in September 1996. The character then starred in The Book of Fate, written by Keith Giffen, which ran from February 1997 to January 1998 for 12 issues as part of DC's "Weirdoverse" imprint, and which rebooted the character's origins and adventures.

However, the revival of the JSA title in 1999 allowed an opportunity for the Doctor Fate character to be reworked, with Jared Stevens subsequently killed off.

The next incarnation of Doctor Fate would come in the form of Hector Hall, the son of the Golden Age Hawkman and Hawkgirl, who is reincarnated due to the machinations of Mordru. A fan-favorite incarnation, the character was featured in the JSA title and a five-issue Doctor Fate limited series in 2003. Hector Hall was killed in the Day of Vengeance limited series in 2005 as part of the lead-in to the 2005 company-wide event crossover, Infinite Crisis.

In early 2007, DC published a bi-weekly run of one-shots depicting the search for a new Doctor Fate. These were intended to be followed by a new Doctor Fate ongoing series in April 2007, written by Steve Gerber and illustrated by Paul Gulacy, featuring the new Doctor Fate. However, the series was delayed due to extended production and creative difficulties. Gerber said in an interview for Newsarama that the story intended for the first arc of the Doctor Fate ongoing series had been reworked to serve as the main story for Countdown to Mystery, a dual-feature eight-issue miniseries with Eclipso as the second feature. The first issue of Countdown to Mystery, with art by Justiniano and Walden Wong rather than Gulacy, was released in November 2007. Following Gerber's death, the seventh issue was written by Adam Beechen using Gerber's notes. The final issue was written by Beechen, Gail Simone, Mark Waid, and Mark Evanier, who each wrote a different ending to the story. The character then appeared in the Reign in Hell miniseries and in Justice Society of America (vol. 3) #30 (August 2009), featuring in the book until its cancellation with #54 in August 2011. During the series, writer Marc Guggenheim described Doctor Fate's role as a powerhouse but intended to flesh out the character.

=== The New 52 and beyond (2011–present) ===
Textless cover of Doctor Fate #13 depicting both Kent Nelson and the newly created incarnation, Khalid Nassour, as Doctor Fate.

Following the events of the Flashpoint mini-series in 2011, DC's continuity was rebooted. As part of The New 52 initiative, an alternate version of Doctor Fate named Khalid Ben-Hassin was created by writer James Robinson and artist Brett Booth. The character was featured in the Earth 2 ongoing series from No. 9 (February 2013) onwards.

After the conclusion of the Convergence limited series in June 2015, DC launched a new Doctor Fate ongoing series, written by Paul Levitz and drawn by Sonny Liew as part of the DC You initiative, which saw an emphasis on "story over continuity", loosening the restrictions of continuity to allow for a diverse range of genres while some characters underwent status quo changes. The title focused on the newest and most recent incarnation of Doctor Fate, Egyptian-American medical student Khalid Nassour. Created with an emphasis on diversity and inspired by Marvel Comics heroes Spider-Man and Doctor Strange, the series also rebooted the Kent Nelson character, depicting him as a previous Doctor Fate, a mentor figure with some of his old history intact. The series ran for 18 issues, from June 2015 to November 2016.

In 2018, DC launched a second Justice League Dark series written by James Tynion IV starring a new roster led by Wonder Woman. In this roster, Khalid and Kent Nelson were revealed to be eventual new members of the Justice League, originally acting as "advisors" in the team and becoming recurring characters. Khalid would eventually permanently become the new Doctor Fate instead of Kent Nelson in the "Lords of Order" storyline. Khalid would also receive a new redesign as Doctor Fate. Kent Nelson would be later killed off in the "A Costly Trick of Magic" storyline, leaving Khalid Nassour as the sole Doctor Fate incarnation in mainstream comics. However, Nelson continued making posthumous appearances. In late 2023 and 2024, Kent would make appearances in various titles such as Green Lantern: Alan Scott and Jay Garrick: The Flash, which take place decades prior to the character's death in Justice League Dark.

== Characterization ==
Doctor Fate is a sorcerous hero empowered by the Lords of Order to fight the forces of evil, chiefly the Lords of Chaos. Known for their limitless power, the character is officially regarded as one of the most powerful magic wielders in the DC Universe dependent on the incarnation. In particular, the original has sometimes been stated to be the most powerful version, although this has varied.

=== Description and personality ===
Young and old versions of Kent Nelson.

Within mainstream comics, Kent Nelson has been described as a kind academic and is of Swedish and American ancestry. A physician and archaeologist early in his history, later stories made him exclusively the latter. Kent is portrayed as a man distinct from Nabu, a detached being whose influence upon Kent negatively affects his relation with love interest, Inza Cramer. Writer Martin Pasko explains that while Kent was not insensitive to Inza's plights, he is powerless to ignore the call of service from Nabu in the helm, presumably (later confirmed) being one of the many people serving as "host vessels" of Nabu.

In his physical design, the character has been depicted as a blonde or white-haired man (dependent on age). Drawn with a muscular build, the character is portrayed as being 6'2" with blue eyes. As Doctor Fate, his default attire includes a tight-fitting suit blue bodysuit with yellow boots, cape, gloves, and trunks. Frequently, he also possess a circular amulet below the neck and a yellow cloak. His attire has changed over time; his modern appearance depict a similar appearance with his body suit, gloves, cape, and boots of similar color scheme (blue/yellow) although the underpants is absent, replaced with a golden Egyptian sun-disk belt buckle. Nelson's Helmet of Fate design has differed throughout publication; modelled after a corinthian helmet, the helm is traditionally designed as a smooth, full-face golden helm with a prominent vertical fin running along the top, narrow eye slits. In modern settings, the helm appears similar although at times with glowing eye slits and appears more angular with sharper edges. With the half-helmet, his appearance retains his traditional appearance but the bottom of his face is visible, making him visually similar to a traditional superhero.

In visualizing Doctor Fate's magic within mainstream comic books, artist Walt Simonson explained in an interview he sought to establish a structured visual language similar to Steve Ditko's approach on Doctor Strange. Inspired by Ditko's use of vectors and circles to give magic a coherent system, Doctor Fate's design instead employed the Egyptian ankh as a recurring symbol. This was combined with typographic experimentation — using letters and geometric forms such as circles and spirals as design elements—to create a distinctive visual system. Since its creation, the ankh has since remained a consistent motif for the character and the later incarnations. Within the DC Extended Universe, Doctor Fate's magical effects were alternatively depicted through refractive and crystalline visuals developed by Wētā FX and other studios; according to VFX supervisor Bill Westenhofer, the team emphasized a "refractive crystalline structure" to make the magic interact with scene lighting, while incorporating the Egyptian ankh motif. Fate's abilities also included the creation of crystalline force fields, glass-like clones that shatter on impact, and geometric constructs to giving the character's magic a distinct and structured visual identity.

=== Fictional character biography ===
Having existed since 1940, the characters' history has been subjected to numerous revisions and retroactive changes over time. Additionally, the Doctor Fate character became a legacy hero in 1987, with numerous incarnations succeeding the character, his history told in post-humorous appearances, and being subjected to comic book deaths and revivals.

==== Pre-Crisis on Infinite Earth ====
Originally, the character was claimed to have no childhood and was created by elder gods to battle evil. Later, Doctor Fate was retroactively revealed as Kent Nelson, son of archaeologist Sven Nelson who is chosen by Nabu after accidentally killing his father with poisonous gas. He explains he is an immortal alien from Cilia and pities the boy, teaching "secrets of the universe" and raising him into adulthood to become Doctor Fate. Retroactive revisions would reveal Nabu altered young Kent's mind to erase his grief and pain and gradually possess him as an adult. Another would have Nabu as a cosmic being of the Lords of Order who sought to use young Kent, aging him to adulthood instantly and imparted into him his mystical knowledge in the process. One of his earliest adversaries was archnemesis Wotan. who kidnapped his love interest Inza Cramer and tries to kill her to defeat the hero. Fate prevails, trapping him suspended animation, Fate buries him deep within the Earth. A native of Earth-Two, Nelson meets with the Justice League of Earth-1, a superhero team of a parallel world. Throughout his life, Nelson battled foes such as mummy sorcerer Khalis while dealing with a frustrated Inza and struggling marriage, whom he has married fifteen years after. The Lord of Chaos Totec once weaponized Inza's envy against Fate and Inza once contemplated infidelity, leading Nabu to allow Inza to join Kent in defeating a foe, gain an understanding of the efforts of Doctor Fate, and allow them to mend their marriage. After years of retirement, Doctor Fate becomes semi-active and helps the teams.

==== Post-Crisis on Infinite Earths ====
In 1985, the character later appears in the Marv Wolfman and George Pérez's Crisis on Infinite Earths crossover series, merging both Earth-1 and Earth-2 realities within the multiverse altering event, with all past definitive histories having been said to happen on this composite universe ("Earth"). The stories from his first appearances (More Fun Comics #55), his origin story (More Fun Comics #67), 1st Issue Special #9, DC Special Series #10, and all his backup stories in The Flash #306-313 are considered definitive adventures and stories for the character in which were reprinted whereas older Golden Age and Silver Age stories were no longer considered canonical to his new universe. Unlike other characters, most of his history was intact.

In the late 1980s, an older Kent Nelson becomes a founding member of Justice League International but when his advance age yields issues, he reluctantly helps Nabu choose a successor in Eric and Linda Strauss while learning of Nabu's deception over the decades, as Doctor Fate was intended to be a merging between him and Inza but the cosmic being withheld it to better control Doctor Fate, as a merged pair was too powerful for Nabu to control. Following Kent's death, his body and identity are usurped by Nabu, who intended to learn how to be human and advises the second incarnation of Doctor Fate.

Both Kent and Inza are eventually revived into younger bodies, the former becoming the incarnation succeeding the Strauss pair as they move into a district in New York. With the roles reversed and a rogue Lord of Order, Shat-Ru, inhabiting his old body in place of Nabu after his disappearance following Eric and Linda's death, Nelson poses as his own grandson whom inherited his likeness and interest in archaeology, convincing the elderly dean (whom he once taught decades ago) for an opportunity in becoming a college teaching assistant despite lacking credentials, claiming they were destroyed. Eventually, his identity and history is outed by the Lords of Chaos but with Shat-Ru's patronage, he re-gains his powers as Doctor Fate and works con-currently with Inza in the role as the pair also merge occasionally. Eventually, Nelson is killed once more although details differ; the original account had them killed off by demons hunting for the helm after being wounded by Extant but witness their future successor Jared Stevens and are granted into heaven with Spectre's appeal. A later account has Nelson trick Stevens into the role so Nabu can release their souls.

During Hall's tenure as Doctor Fate, the spirit of Nelson seemingly aids him in his first defeat of Mordru and informs him he can advise him from the Amulet of Anubis if he wishes. However, that instance proved to be false, as Nabu reveals him and other spirits he had conversed to be figments of Hector's imagination created from a need to prove himself a legitimate incarnation of Doctor Fate as he is also emotionally distraught from his wife being seemingly comatose and his magical powers unable to help her. Ultimately, it is revealed his "wife" was Dawn Granger, his biological mother in his current reincarnation enchanted with her appearance by Mordru and that his wife, Fury, was instead secretly imprisoned in Amulet of Anubis at some point alongside the spirits of other incarnations, including Kent Nelson. When Nabu usurps Hector's body to assist Black Adam, Kent alongside the others combined their powers to rest control back to Hector. Kent Nelson's spirit from the distant past (during the ordeal with Grey Man) to help Hal Jordan (Green Lantern) in more recent times while the latter is stuck on a planet with no way to escape. Kent learns of his future death but chooses to save Hal, instead, despite Hal's protests.

==== New 52 onwards (2011 - Present) ====
Kent Nelson's modern design in appearances within the present day prior to his death. Art by Amancay Nahuelpan.

Since the characters' re-appearance in 2015, numerous revisions to the characters' background has kept intact some histories while changing others; Kent's history remains similar to his post-Crisis history, his marriage with Inza Cramer, and his connection with the Justice Society. Nelson also has a brother who fathers his niece, Elizabeth Nelson, and is a source of inspiration in her life to become an archaeologist.

During his earlier years as Doctor Fate, he was a member of the Justice Society Dark, a magical off-shoot of the Justice Society, and had a sidekick named Salem Nader (Salem the Witch Girl), an arrogant witch from Limbo Town who was cursed to negatively affect those she becomes close to. However, she disappeared following her cruise nearly killing Inza (his girlfriend at the time) and despite his and the team's efforts; unbeknownst to him, she was displaced from time and gradually forgotten about her.

In a time-related incident involving Per Degaton's time manipulations, he has several instances his life where he vaguely remembers, has visions of the death of the JSA across different points in time, and would aid the modern Justice Society. During his lifetime, he would originally warn Catwoman of the eventual targeting of her future daughter years before his death but aspects of this is adverted due to the involvement of a future Doctor Fate. Eventually, he is succeeded by Eric and Linda Strauss as Doctor Fate, the pair having teamed up with Darkseid, Highfather, and others to help to stop the Anti-Life entity. After their death, Hector Hall becomes the third Doctor Fate during the founding of a new JSA iteration by Wesley Dodds.

Eventually, Nelson reappears and reveals himself to Khalid Nassour, his grand-nephew, as the previous Doctor Fate and begins mentoring him, helping him in various cases such as stopping an Ifrit set to destroy New York and Osiris, who unleashes the undead and seeks retribution for Anubis's defeat by Nassour sometime prior to Nelson's revelation towards Khalid. Nelson eventually takes precedent within the role, with Nabu also briefly usurping it to battle Arion and assist the Blue Beetle (Jaime Reyes). Sometime later, they are trapped by Nabu, who uses Nelson's body and conspires with other Lords of Order to destroy the source of magic following the piercing of the Source Wall. Their plans are interrupted by Wonder Woman's newly created Justice League Dark and their allies. Enlisting the power of chaos magic from Mordru, Kent is freed of Nabu's control and the team prevails in defeating the Lords of Order. Wonder Woman asks Nelson to don the helmet once more, who refuses due to his disillusionment and recommends Khalid, who then declines. The pair enlist themselves as consultant members of Justice League Dark but when the team is pitted against Circe's Injustice League Dark, Khalid becomes the sole Doctor Fate and assists in their defeat, prompting a concerned Kent. With Nassour now the new Doctor Fate, Nelson leaves the team with intent to retire once more and believes himself unable to train Nassour further. Nelson later appears for the final time as Doctor Fate during the team's battle with Upside-Down Man, when Nabu summons him. Nelson sacrifices himself when the pair unleash a critical blow at the villain, killing him and depleting the helm of its power. As Nassour sees his death as a personal failure, Detective Chimp asserts he made the sacrifice with high hopes in his grandnephew's abilities.

Now deceased, Nelson's spirit continues to influence the living; when a girl calling herself Kid Eternity follows Wildcat into the afterlife after he is killed by Lady Eve, Nelson is among the dead JSA members who tell Kid Eternity that the JSA is in danger and that they need her help.

=== Powers and abilities ===
Doctor Fate's powers in early stories were of scientific origin, convering matter to energy and vice versa to perform feats while being a skilled in jujutsu and a trained physician. This was later changed to having genuine supernatural powers. The bulk of Doctor Fate's powers originated from various artifacts, granting god-level knowledge, magical power, and are nearly unmatched spell-casting powers. They are also protected against inherent risks associated with practicing magic. While possessing those traits when empowered, Kent on his own has a level of invulnerability, an extended lifespan, and peak human capabilities due to mystical enhancement from Nabu. He can cast minor spells or draw power from artifacts indirectly. Separate from his powers, he is an archaeologist with a doctorate, specializing in Egyptology, and a capable teacher in both the mystic arts and archaeology, the latter at college level.

Doctor Fate has several weaknesses, being unable to cast counter spells against him due to the rules of magic. Nelson's full powers (alongside other incarnations) is also inferior to the Spectre in power. Finally, Nelson's advanced age has affected his performance over time to his detriment even with his longevity to the point of later requiring successors.

==== Mystical artiacts and resources ====
While empowered through various artifacts, he has many powers at his disposal such as flight, teleportation, precognition, and illusion casting. The Amulet of Anubis is a powerful artifact created by the aforementioned deity before being appropriated by Nabu or was created from the remains of Cilia. The amulet has its own pocket dimension and offers protection against astral probing, mind control, and can trap souls. The Cloak of Destiny grants invulnerability, superhuman strength, flight, and protection from fire and chaos magic. Doctor Fate's base of operations, the Tower of Fate, is a nexus point of magic and reality on Earth. The tower is only accessible through magic and lacks doors or windows. Inside, it appears as a twisted maze of stairways and hallways where the laws of physics do not apply. The Tower of Fate houses a vast personal library containing arcane texts, including materials salvaged from the Library of Alexandria, and is fortified with mystical defenses. The tower also houses the Orb of Nabu, a crystal ball that seeks hidden threats by reacting to Doctor Fate's brainwaves. Although not explicitly magical, it provides valuable insights.

===== Helmet of Fate =====
The Helmet of Fate is a powerful artifact possessing baseline abilities which allows a bearer to see the destiny ("fate") of others or potential futures. The wearer cannot be predicted from others with precognition abilities and is immune to probability-related powers. One story also asserted it possess near infinite power that surpasses Darkseid. Whether guided by the residing spirit within the helm or through the helm's own intelligence, the artifact is typically accessible only to individuals deemed worthy. Its construction has also been altered over time; originally constructed from gold, later revisions have instead made it constructed of Nth Metal, giving it unique properties which includes selectively negate magical forces, defy gravity, enhance physical abilities, bond with given bearers, and heal quickly. Despite its durable nature, the Helmet of Fate is not impervious to damage. It has shown vulnerability to abilities originating from powerful entities, some of which included potent forms of Atlantean magic, power from higher beings such as the Spectre, and advanced applications of the Firestorm matrix, requiring regeneration. It can also experience overload, resulting in temporary limitations and the inertness.

While possessing baseline powers, aspects of the helm also has different powers depending on the bearer. When wielded by Nelson, the helm allows him to embody the essence of the Lords of Order and wield magic similarly to them powered by imagination, and allow him to perform virtually any magical feat. Alternatively, he can draw upon Egyptian-based magic and even other sources like those used by Merlin. Nelson can also merge with a chosen female bearer into a more powerful entity.

== Other versions ==
Mainstream incarnations of Doctor Fate: Eric and Linda Strauss, Inza Cramer, Jared Stevens, Hector Hall, Kent V. Nelson, and Khalid Nassour. (left to right)

Since the character's debut, stories has established that past incarnations similarly served as host vessels for Nabu, originally Egyptian champions selected by the ancient Egyptian deities. These champions used either the title "Pharaoh" or "Lord". Various versions of Doctor Fate, be it alternate versions of Kent Nelson or alternate variants, also exist in the DC Multiverse.

Following Nelson's first comic book death in 1987, several other versions succeeded the character; Originally, Kent's successors were Eric and Linda Strauss, who merged to become a singular entity that was called Doctor Fate. Kent's love interest, Inza Cramer, would briefly become Doctor Fate before going to Jared Stevens, depicted as a much different version. Following his death a few years later, a resurrected Hector Hall assumed the role but was killed off and succeeded by Kent V. Nelson, the grand-nephew of the original Kent Nelson and namesake. Following The New 52, changes to continuity would replace the mainstream version of Doctor Fate with Khalid Nassour. Unlike the original, all subsequent versions differ due to retaining agency as Doctor Fate.

Since the New 52 reboot in 2011, the characters' histories has undergone numerous revisions; Khalid Nassour was originally the successor of Kent Nelson within earlier versions of the newer continuity, establishing himself as the modern incarnation. This has since been altered in some comic book stories, with the Geoff John's 2022 Justice Society of America run re-establishing the prior versions of Doctor Fate into the new mainstream continuity. Later, within Mark Waid's 2025 New History of the DC Universe mini-series, Doctor Fate's revised history omits Inza, Jared, and Kent V. Nelson. Eric and Linda Strauss are vaguely alluded to, while Hector Hall is cited as the third Doctor Fate, making Nassour the fourth incarnation.

=== Khalid Nassour ===
Created by Paul Levitz and Sonny Liew, Khalid Nassour serves as the modern incarnation of the character. Both of the Nelson bloodline and of Egyptian ancestry (paternally), he is introduced as an Egyptian-American Muslim and medical student who inherits the role of Doctor Fate. Unlike Nelson, he is among the subsequent versions with agency as Doctor Fate. Partially inspired by Marvel Comics' Spider-Man and Doctor Strange, he is initially a twenty-two year medical student burdened with a significant responsibility and interacts in a mystical world similarly to Strange. Since his inception, the character is both a physician and sole Doctor Fate incarnation. Well-received among critics, this version is compared to Marvel Comics' Kamala Khan as representing an underrepresented demographic while also praising his design and incorporation of Egyptian elements compared to Greek/Roman.

== Supporting cast ==
In both More Fun Comics and Immortal Doctor Fate (backup issues from Flash), Doctor Fate has a small cast of characters; Inza Cramer, whom acts as his love interest, acts as his partner and confidante whom later becomes his wife. Nabu, his patron, is also a reluctant ally whom is responsible for gradually eroding his personal agency as Doctor Fate. Vern Copeland is a fellow archaeologist whom is also smitten with Inza and noted to have similarities to Kent. The second half of the 1988 Doctor Fate series featured a larger supporting cast: Tooly and Tildly Wilson, an African-American couple and supporter of Doctor Fate with three children. Debby Niles, a police officer and niece of the Wilsons, was Inza's best friend and a close confidante whom was aware of their dual life. Another included corrupt billionaire-turned-ally Thomas Bridge, Shat-Ru, a renegade-turned-friend and Lord of Order who posed as Kent's grandfather and spouted nihilistic ideals, and his eccentric girlfriend, Dorothea.

=== Enemies ===
Doctor Fate also has numerous enemies of his own, featured in his limited series or significant with him from other appearances. Out of all his villains, Wotan is the most reoccurring villain whom is considered both his rival and arch-enemy as well as also battling other incarnations. Others, such as Negal, have also been reoccurring with other incarnations. Although Arion is typically a hero, the character has been listed as his adversary due to appearances in other titles wherein he was under mystical influence.

Character	First appearance
Wotan	More Fun Comics #55 (May 1940)
Negal	More Fun Comics #67 (May 1941)
Ian Karkull	More Fun Comics #69 (August 1941)
Khalis	1st Issue Special #9 (December 1975)
Mango the Mighty	More Fun Comics #57 (July 1940)
Kulak	All-Star Comics #2 (September 1940)
Totec / Malferrazae	The Flash #306 (backup feature)
Arion	Warlord #55 (March 1982)
Ynar	The Flash #310 (June 1982)
Gray Man	Justice League #2 (June 1987)
Non-mystical villains
Mister Who	More Fun Comics #73 (November 1941)
The Dude	More Fun Comics #75 (January 1942)
Clock	More Fun Comics #81 (July 1942)
Groups
Lords of Chaos	Retcon: More Fun Comics #55 (May 1940) Actual: DC Special Series #10 (January 1978)
Anti-Fate Group	Doctor Fate v2 #35 (November 1991)

== Cultural impact and legacy ==
=== Positive reception ===
As a character, Doctor Fate has established himself as one of DC Comics' enduring figures, although not reaching the same level of cultural recognition as iconic characters like Batman, Superman, Wonder Woman or the Flash. According to Wizard Magazine, Doctor Fate's notable strengths lie in his name, distinctive design, and the recurring motif of the Helmet of Fate. While the character has experienced various cancellations over time, they have also been the focus of multiple miniseries and ongoing series. The character's portrayal by Pierce Brosnan in Black Adam was also received well and was once slated to eventually appear again in the DC Extended Universe due to his popularity prior to James Gunn's appointment as creative head for DC Studios.

=== Criticisms ===
==== Orientalist portrayal ====
The original character's connection to Egypt has been subjected to various criticisms due to Nelson's usage of the Egyptian mysticism, In Mixed Race Superheroes, Resha critiques Kent Nelson's incarnation as the archetypal white Western hero who freely accesses Egyptian mysticism without repercussions, contrasting it to Nassour. In a noted example within issue #9 of the 2015 Doctor Fate series, she points out Nassour's worry about intervening in a massive demonstration gone awry within the United Nations plaza without being labelled "some kind of super-villain or costumed terrorist" and asserts how while Nelson's incarnation likely would not have worried about being labelled a terrorist (and only a super-villain at worst), Nassour's incarnation is aware he would not be afforded the same level of protections as a person of color. Within media portrayals such as Black Adam, Doctor Fate is among the characters cited within the Justice Society where their intervention in the fictional Arab nation of Kahndaq is critiqued as reinforcing "Orientalist stereotypes through the male imperial gaze" and exemplifies how Western superhero narratives "reproduc[e] a colonial vision where Western 'knowledge' of ancient civilizations 'rescues' the past from oblivion," exotifying and objectifying Arab figures while erasing their agency.

Within mainstream comic books, Paul Levitz created the Khalid Nassour version of the character to address similar concerns, believing Nelson's connection to Egypt to be a by-product of a time when writers could not write in detail about ethnicity and religion. James Robinson's creation of Khalid Ben-Hassin years earlier (featured in an Elseworld universe) was also made to avoid an offensive characterization, opting to make the character Egyptian-American to allow him to have Western traits.

==== Portrayal of abilities ====
Steve Gerber was critical of the character's abilities prior to 2007 pointing out the character's inconsistent power level, which posed challenges for writers in defining the character effectively. Moreover, Gerber expressed reservations about the recurring element of the Nabu entity controlling Doctor Fate, as he believed it hindered the character's ability to form meaningful connections. Additionally, Gerber advocated for an original interpretation of magic, akin to the approach taken with Marvel's Doctor Strange, rather than Doctor Fate's association with Egyptian mythology and believed the character's history to be among the most convoluted. He sought to address this with the Kent V. Nelson incarnation of the character. James Robinson also stated how despite the reoccurring theme of a "cost" to magic, Doctor Fate's magical powers "feels and certainly looks no different than a blast of energy from Green Lantern's ring. It's just energy that gets fired."

=== Critical response ===
- ScreenRant included Doctor Fate in their "The 10 Most Powerful Wizards".
- Doctor Fate was included in CBR's "Top 50 DC Characters".
- Ashley Land of CBR included Doctor Fate in their "Greatest Supernatural DC Heroes".
- In 1998, Wizard Magazine published an article in which included Doctor Fate in their "All-Wizard Team", which consisted of a list of the most powerful, versatile heroes in a respective field.

== In other media ==
=== Television ===
==== Live action ====
- Doctor Fate and his wife Inza Nelson appear in the Smallville two-part episode "Absolute Justice", portrayed by Brent Stait and Erica Carroll respectively. Additionally, the Helmet of Fate appears in the episode "Lazarus", where Chloe Sullivan uses it to locate Green Arrow.
- The Helmet of Fate makes a cameo appearance in the Constantine episode "Non Est Asylum".
- Doctor Fate appears in Stargirl, portrayed by an uncredited actor. This version is a member of the Justice Society of America who was killed by the Injustice Society a decade prior to the series.

==== Animation ====
- Doctor Fate appears in series set in the DC Animated Universe (DCAU), voiced initially by George DelHoyo in Superman: The Animated Series and later by Oded Fehr in Justice League and Justice League Unlimited.
- Doctor Fate appears in Batman: The Brave and the Bold, voiced by Greg Ellis.
- Doctor Fate appears in Mad, voiced by Kevin Shinick.
- Doctor Fate appears in Justice League Action, voiced by Erica Luttrell as a child.
- Doctor Fate appears in DC Nation Shorts.
- Several incarnations of Doctor Fate appear in Young Justice.
  - Kent Nelson (voiced by Ed Asner) is a retired member of the Justice Society of America and mentor to Giovanni Zatara who ceased being Nabu's host due to its effects on Nelson's marriage. Klarion later kills Nelson, with his spirit inhabiting the Helmet of Fate.
  - Nabu (voiced by Kevin Michael Richardson) was originally a son of Vandal Savage who was regarded in Mesopotamian mythology as Marduk and a god of wisdom before he was killed by Klarion the Witch Boy and became a Lord of Order. Following this, Nabu must anchor himself to Earth via a physical host, whom he completely overwrites as a requirement for those who bear his helm, and has taken many hosts over the succeeding millennia.
  - The Team later obtains the Helmet of Fate, which is used by members Aqualad and Kid Flash in certain situations. After Zatanna dons the helmet to fight Klarion, Nabu refuses to relinquish her until Zatara convinces Nabu to take him instead. In season four, Zatanna forms the Sentinels of Magic, which includes Khalid Nassour (voiced by Usman Ally) and Traci Thurston (voiced by Lauren Tom), to free Zatara and convince Nabu to alternate between all of them.

=== Film ===
- Doctor Fate appears in the opening credits of Justice League: The New Frontier.
- An evil, unnamed, alternate universe variant of Doctor Fate makes a cameo appearance in Justice League: Crisis on Two Earths as a minor member of the Crime Syndicate.
- Doctor Fate appears in Lego DC Comics Super Heroes: The Flash, voiced by Kevin Michael Richardson.
- An original incarnation of Doctor Fate named Steel Maxum appears in Suicide Squad: Hell to Pay, voiced by Greg Grunberg. He was chosen by Nabu for his fitness until Scandal Savage and Knockout stole a "Get Out of Hell Free" card from him. In response, Nabu ousted Maxum from the Tower of Fate for his recklessness and irresponsibility and replaced him with "some chick" according to Maxum. In the present, Maxum joins a male strip club as the "Pharaoh" before he is simultaneously confronted by the Suicide Squad and Professor Zoom and his henchmen, Silver Banshee and Blockbuster. While Silver Banshee knocks him unconscious, the squad retrieves and escapes with Maxum. After regaining consciousness, he explains how the card works before the squad leave him on the streets, where Zoom's henchmen catch him.
- An Earth-2 variant of Doctor Fate appears in Justice Society: World War II, voiced by Keith Ferguson.
- Doctor Fate appears in Black Adam, portrayed by Pierce Brosnan.

=== Video games ===
- The Kent Nelson incarnation of Doctor Fate appears as a NPC, later a playable DLC character, in DC Universe Online.
- Doctor Fate appears as a support card in the mobile version of Injustice: Gods Among Us.
- The Kent Nelson incarnation of Doctor Fate appears as a playable character in Lego Batman 3: Beyond Gotham.
- The Kent Nelson incarnation of Doctor Fate appears as a playable character in Injustice 2, voiced by David Sobolov.
- The Kent Nelson incarnation of Doctor Fate appears as a playable character in Lego DC Super-Villains.
- The Kent V. Nelson and Khalid Nassour incarnations of Doctor Fate appears as character summons in Scribblenauts Unmasked: A DC Comics Adventure.

=== Other ===
- Doctor Fate appears in the DC Heroes United interactive streaming series. This version's Doctor Fate is a guardian of the balance between fate and chaos and is alternatively supported by the entities known as the Moirai, the personification of fate in Greek mythology.
