= Red Ryan (comics) =

Matthew "Red" Ryan

Publication information
- Publisher: DC Comics
- First appearance: Showcase #6 (February 1957)
- Created by: Jack Kirby

In-story information
- Species: Human
- Team affiliations: Challengers of the Unknown

Matthew "Red" Ryan is a fictional character and member of the adventure team Challengers of the Unknown, published by DC Comics. He was created by Jack Kirby, and debuted in Showcase #6 (February 1957).

In 1967, the character was killed in a story called "Taps for Red" (Challengers of the Unknown #55, April 1967), but his death was undone after six issues.

== Fictional character biography ==
An accomplished stunt man and daredevil performer, Red Ryan is known for his athletic ability and fearless attitude towards extreme sport. He was scheduled to appear on a radio program with pilot Ace Morgan, scientist Walter "Prof" Haley, and boxer Rocky Davis. After their plane crashes in the Rocky Mountains, the four men emerge from the wreckage alive and unscathed. Deciding to band together, they form the Challengers of the Unknown and embark on a career of adventuring and exploration.

During one of their adventures, Red appears to be killed off, and his younger brother, pop star Marty "Tino Manarry" Ryan, joins the team in his absence. However, Red soon returns to the team, and Marty leaves after receiving injuries that render him blind.

Years later, a middle-aged Red is still affiliated with the Challengers and living in Challenger Mountain. When Multi-Man sabotages the team's generator, the resulting explosion destroys their base and the nearby town, killing thousands of people. Although Prof and June are supposedly deceased, Red, Ace and Rocky survive the blast and are charged with criminal negligence. Despite being found not guilty, they are ordered to disband as a team. Following the split, Red becomes a vigilante mercenary. His activities take him to Gotham City, where he is dissuaded by Batman to leave. Later, he rejoins Ace and Rocky to reform the Challengers.

== Alternate versions ==
- Red Ryan appears prominently with the rest of the Challengers in Darwyn Cooke's miniseries DC: The New Frontier. This version of the character is portrayed as a James Dean-type rebel who struggles with the near-fatal plane crash. Unable to get the memory out of his mind, he goes to the crash site and meets up with Morgan, Haley and Davis, who resolve to seek adventure and explore the mysterious. They participate in the attempted space rescue of Rick Flag and the defence against The Centre.
- As part of The New 52's DC Comics Presents, Red is one of eight people scheduled to appear on a reality show.

== In other media ==
- Matthew "Red" Ryan makes a non-speaking cameo appearance in Justice League: The New Frontier.
- Matthew "Red" Ryan appears in Batman: The Brave and the Bold, voiced by Ioan Gruffudd.
