= Red Ryan =

Red Ryan may refer to:

- Norman J. Ryan, Canadian gangster
- Red Ryan (baseball), American baseball player
- Red Ryan (comics), fictional character
