= Scare tactics (disambiguation) =

Scare tactics may refer to:

- Scare tactics, or fear mongering, the tactical use of fear, fright, or terror
- Scare Tactics, a 2003–2013 American hidden-camera pranks television series
- Scare Tactics (comic), a 1996–1998 DC Comics mini-series.
