= Howard Sherman =

Howard Sherman may refer to:

- Sherman Howard (Howard Lee Sherman, born 1949), American actor
- Howard Sherman (cricketer) (born 1943), former English cricketer
- Howard Sherman (comics), co-creator of Tommy Tomorrow
