= Weirdoverse =

Comic book series

The Weirdoverse is a group of semi-related comic book series published from late 1996 to 1998 by DC Comics. The idea of Dan Thorsland (the editor of all four series), the Weirdoverse titles were connected by the fact that they all fell into the mystery/occult genre. Despite the name making it sound like the four series were set in their own universe, all were connected to DC's main shared universe, the DC Universe.

The four books that made up the Weirdoverse were:

- The Book of Fate (12 issues, February 1997 – January 1998)
- Challengers of the Unknown (18 issues, February 1997 – July 1998)
- Night Force (12 issues, December 1996 – November 1997)
- Scare Tactics (12 issues, December 1996 – March 1998)

== Convergence ==
The Weirdoverse books were involved in one single crossover. The story was titled "Convergence" and took place in all four series' July 1997 dated issues.

== See also ==
- Convergence, an unrelated event tied to the DC multiverse
