= King Faraday =

- King Faraday on the cover of Danger Trail vol. 2 #4. Art by Paul Gulacy.

Publication information
- Publisher: DC Comics
- First appearance: Danger Trail #1 (August 1950)
- Created by: Robert Kanigher; Carmine Infantino

In-story information
- Alter ego: King Faraday
- Species: Human
- Team affiliations: Suicide Squad; Checkmate; Central Bureau of Intelligence
- Partnerships: Nightshade
- Notable aliases: White Queen's Bishop
- Abilities: Experienced espionage agent

King Faraday is a fictional secret agent featured in DC Comics. Faraday first appeared in Danger Trail #1 (August 1950), and was created by Robert Kanigher and Carmine Infantino.

Faraday's last appearance in the 1950s was in World's Finest Comics #64 (May–June 1953). He was picked up again after more than twenty-five years, in Batman #313 (July 1979).

== Fictional character biography ==
Danger Trail #1, art by Carmine Infantino.

He is named "King" by his father as a joke, a play on the phrase "King for a day".

An ex-soldier, he takes a position as a counter-espionage agent for the U.S. government and engages in a variety of standard spy-type capers. Some of his Danger Trail adventures are reprinted in Showcase #50 (May–June 1964) under the title "I-Spy". Faraday is later incorporated into the DC Universe as a member of the Central Bureau of Intelligence. He is also Nightshade's mentor, and recruited her and Bronze Tiger into Task Force X.

In One Year Later, Faraday is a member of Checkmate, serving as the Bishop for White Queen Amanda Waller.

In The New 52: Futures End, Faraday works with Grifter to investigate alien and cross-dimensional spies on Earth.

== Skills and abilities ==
Faraday possesses no superhuman abilities but is a trained espionage agent and an expert hand-to-hand fighter and marksman.

== Other versions ==
- An alternate universe variant of King Faraday appears in the Tangent Comics one-shot Green Lantern. This version is a Moldavan exile and detective who died in a plane crash before Green Lantern temporarily resurrects him to solve his last unfinished case.
- An alternate universe variant of King Faraday appears in DC: The New Frontier. This version is the leader of Project Flying Cloud, a movement to capture metahumans. However, he befriends Martian Manhunter and later sacrifices himself to save him from The Centre.

== In other media ==
=== Television ===
- King Faraday appears in Justice League Unlimited, voiced by Scott Patterson. This version is the Justice League's liaison with the U.S. government.
- King Faraday appears in the Young Justice episode "Performance", voiced by Clancy Brown. This version is an agent of Interpol.

=== Film ===
- The New Frontier incarnation of King Faraday appears in Justice League: The New Frontier, voiced by Phil Morris.
- King Faraday appears in Catwoman: Hunted, voiced by Jonathan Frakes. This version is an agent of Interpol.
- King Faraday appears in Justice League: Warworld, voiced by Frank Grillo.

=== Video games ===
King Faraday appears as a character summon in Scribblenauts Unmasked: A DC Comics Adventure.

=== Miscellaneous ===
King Faraday appears in Smallville Season 11. This version is an agent of Checkmate who bonded with a captive White Martian named Megan, treating her as a daughter. He is later killed during General Zod's attack on the Castle, one of Checkmate's bases.
