= Challengers of the Unknown =

Group of fictional characters in comic books published by DC Comics

- Challengers of the Unknown #1 (1958), cover art by Jack Kirby.

Publication information
- Publisher: DC Comics
- First appearance: Showcase #6 (February 1957)
- Created by: Jack Kirby (possibly with Joe Simon or Dave Wood)

In-story information
- Base(s): Challengers Mountain
- Member(s): Kyle "Ace" Morgan; Matthew "Red" Ryan; Leslie "Rocky" Davis; Walter Mark "Prof" Haley; June Robbins

The Challengers of the Unknown is a fictional group of adventurers appearing in comic books published by DC Comics. The quartet of adventurers explored paranormal occurrences while facing several fantastic menaces.

The characters' provenance is uncertain. Various sources credit the group as the sole creation of artist and storyteller Jack Kirby, a co-creation with writer Dave Wood or a co-creation with Kirby's former partner Joe Simon. Following the end of the Challengers comic, DC has revived the characters in different incarnations over the years.

Some have claimed that Kirby reworked the basic concept of the series with Stan Lee in 1961 to create The Fantastic Four, the first creation that marked the rise of Marvel Comics.

== Publication history ==
The adventuring quartet the Challengers of the Unknown debuted in Showcase #6 (February 1957), in an uncredited story attributed to Jack Kirby for art and to Kirby and Dick Wood for script, under editor Jack Schiff.

The series continued in the bimonthly Showcase for three more appearances (#7, 11–12, April 1957, December 1957 – February 1958) then moved to its own title, starting with issue #1 (May 1958). Kirby moved on after issue #8 (July 1959), with Bob Brown succeeding him as artist. The title continued through issue #75 (September 1970), followed by two reprint issues. The series was canceled with issue #77 in 1971 (January 1971). In 1973, three reprint issues were published (#78–80). The team's lineup was briefly enhanced with the inclusion of the paranormal sensitive Corrina Stark toward the end of this run.

=== Revivals ===
The Challengers had a short-lived 1976–77 revival in Super-Team Family #8–10. The group then returned to its own title continuing the number with #81. During this period, they were joined by Deadman and Swamp Thing, and associate June Robbins got a uniform and official status. No explanation was given for Corinna Stark's departure, nor June's joining the team. The revived series was canceled with issue #87 in 1978. Adventure Comics Digest #493–497 (1982) featured an expanded version of the team's origin.

The Challengers returned in a limited series, Challengers of the Unknown (vol. 2) (1991), by writer Jeph Loeb and artist Tim Sale. It ran eight issues and was reprinted in trade paperback as Challengers of the Unknown Must Die! (2004). This series depicted the Challengers in middle age, breaking up after a tragic accident and coming back together as a team. Loeb hoped for a monthly title, and planned at least a second limited series, but neither volume materialized. Elements of this revival later appeared in several Superboy stories around the turn of the millennium, as a second, unrelated group had a title in the late 1990s as part of the Weirdoverse line.

In 2000, DC published a one-shot, Silver Age: Challengers of the Unknown, done in the style of the original Silver Age of Comic Books Challengers.

The fifth volume of Challengers of the Unknown, a five-issue limited series, was published from December 2024 to April 2025 as part of the DC All In publishing initiative. The series is written by Christopher Cantwell, with art by Sean Izaakse. The original team, Ace Morgan, June Robbins, Prof Haley, Red Ryan, and Rocky Davis, is featured, collaborating with the Justice League to address threats to the galaxy. A mysterious foe from their past, connected to Darkseid's Omega energy, plays a significant role in the narrative.

== Fictional group history ==
The roster included Ace Morgan, Prof Haley, Rocky Davis and Red Ryan, with their occasional companion June Robbins. Ryan was killed and briefly replaced by his younger brother Marty, a pop singer who used the anagram ID of Tino Manarry. Ryan returned from the dead and Tino was written out after suffering an injury that left him blind. Toward the end of the original series, a woman with an occult background named Corinna Stark acted as a fifth member of the team.

=== Countdown to Final Crisis ===
Prepublication solicitations for various Countdown to Final Crisis tie-ins referred to the group of Donna Troy, Jason Todd, Kyle Rayner, and "Bob" (a nefarious, renegade "purist" Monitor), as "Challengers from Beyond". This group went on a quest through the newly formed multiverse to find Ray Palmer, whom Bob claimed was essential to the survival of the universe. Eventually the Earth heroes were betrayed by Bob, who sought to kill Palmer, rather than protect him or acquire his aid. Palmer, Troy, Todd, and Rayner found themselves involved in a war between the Monitors and Monarch's forces. Later they traveled to Apokolips, where they teamed up with Jimmy Olsen, Forager, Karate Kid and Triplicate Girl. After returning to Earth, Troy, Rayner, Forager, and Palmer decided to team up again. They traveled to the Monitors' headquarters, where they informed the shocked beings that they would be watching over them as a sort of interdimensional border guards.

=== The Brave and the Bold ===
The 2007 revival of The Brave and the Bold series features a storyline involving the Challengers. Destiny of the Endless reveals to Supergirl and Lobo that his Book of Destiny has changed because there appeared to be men who existed, but were not recorded in the book, and their undocumented actions made the book unreliable. Destiny cast the book away, and it was eventually recovered by Batman and Green Lantern with the help of the Challengers, the men in question, who become the new holders of the book. Destiny later reclaims the book.

Leslie "Rocky" Davis appears regularly in Doom Patrol, in which he serves as something of a counselor to the members of that team, and resides on Oolong Island.

=== Post-Flashpoint ===
In 2011, the DC Universe was dramatically altered, giving very different back stories to many of its heroes and villains. This version of the Challengers incorporates elements of the original and 1990s lineups.

The Challengers were formed for a reality television contest, when several notable people were assembled by archaeologist presenter Clay Brody for his "Challengers" program. Clay, the contestants, producer June, and pilots Ace and Maverick, were lost in the Himalayas when their plane crashed under mysterious circumstances. All but one of them showed up weeks later, remembering a recuperation in Nanda Parbat, in which the city's elder told them to beware the unknown, but also to challenge it. Returning to civilization, the group found a talisman that had led Clay to pick them, and a note explaining that it was one of a set.

The Challengers program was retooled to take advantage of the quest. With their home base on a Metropolis soundstage dubbed Challengers Mountain, the group sought out the talismans in far-flung corners of the world, usually accompanied by some oddity, like warrior statues or giant-ant-spewing portals. Their greatest initial challenge came when in a short period their show was cancelled and they were attacked by their dead friend, "Ace" the pilot. Though he killed two of them, they managed to defeat him, and the survivors vowed to find the rest of the talismans and save the world.

=== Rebirth ===
The original Challengers Prof, Ace, Red, and Rocky were on a mission on an Earth in the Dark Multiverse when Prof was badly wounded. He figured out how to use the dark energy to heal himself. In doing so he inadvertently sent his dark multiverse counterpart to the multiverse. The Dark Prof created a new Challengers that he could use to collect the remains of an ancient god whose remains were flung through time and space when the Source Wall was destroyed. The Dark Prof recruits Trina Alvarez, Moses Barber, Krunch, and Bethany Hopkins as the most current incarnation of the team. They soon discover his evil intentions and send him back to the Dark Multiverse, saving Ace, Red, Rocky and Prof in the process.

=== Alternative versions ===
DC published two other series, also titled Challengers of the Unknown, featuring the original Challengers' concept combined with a new set of characters.

The Challengers were revamped by writer Steven Grant in vol. 3 (1997); this iteration had a totally new group of characters and was one of four series making up the Weirdoverse group of titles. This ongoing series ran 18 issues, through 1998. This team of paranormal investigators met the original Challengers and even had Rocky agree to advise them.

One more revamp was done by Howard Chaykin in a six-issue miniseries (vol. 4, 2004–2005). This series had another new group of characters and was entirely unrelated to the previous two incarnations.

== Fictional character biographies ==
When acquaintances miraculously survive a plane crash unscathed, they conclude that since they are "living on borrowed time" they should band together for hazardous adventures. The four—pilot Kyle "Ace" Morgan, daredevil Matthew "Red" Ryan, strong and slow-witted Leslie "Rocky" Davis, and scientist Walter Mark "Prof" Haley—became the Challengers of the Unknown.

Soon famous, the Challengers accept many "unknown challenges" from The Pentagon, mad scientists, and people with a problem. Over time the "Challs" establish the hollowed-out Challengers Mountain as headquarters. Later they adopt an hourglass logo to symbolize time running out. They encounter genies, common and sophisticated thieves, rocs, aliens and robots good and bad. Their adventures later veer toward superheroics, and take in everything from occult menaces to Bermuda Triangle mysteries. The Challengers travel through space, time, and other dimensions. They encounter the likes of the Doom Patrol, Deadman, Swamp Thing, Jonny Double, and the Sea Devils, with whom they fight the criminal group Scorpio. June Robbins, a computer genius and archaeologist, joined the Challengers for many adventures as an "honorary" or "girl" Challenger. June first officially joins the team after the rogue robot Ultivac seemingly kills one of the original Challengers. However that man returns thanks to heroic efforts of modern medical science.

When Red is killed, a teen rock star/engineering genius immediately wages a vendetta against the three-man team. "Tino Mannaray" turns out to be Martin Ryan, Red's kid brother, who blames the team for his death. Red eventually returns; though blown up, he had been dosed with shape-changing Liquid Light and rendered amnesiac, but still nearly conquered the Pacific as a Tiki god.

As the team's challenges become more occult, Red's brother Tino is blinded. Red donates an eye to his brother and dons an eye patch. Eventually Red receives an eye transplant. Prof becomes possessed by an evil spirit and is shot by a villain. While he recovers, Corinna Stark, a mysterious blonde with mystical knowledge, invites herself onto the team. The Challengers fight occult alien-monsters in backwoods villages and dark dreams, and Rocky and Red fight for Corinna's affection.

=== Challengerville ===
The Challs are later semi-retired, their mountain a theme park, and their adventures disregarded as cooked-up articles in a tabloid, The Tattletale. The nearby town has renamed itself Challengerville, managing to thrive on the team's name. A cosmic entity, which prides itself as "the personification of all evil", influences the entity Multi-Man to blow up the mountain. The town is destroyed. Hundreds die, including, seemingly, Prof and June. The surviving Challengers are placed on trial, but eventually freed with the testimony of Superman. However, they are ordered to disband.

A tabloid reporter, Moffet, becomes involved with the group after several unexplained incidents. Moffet begins to piece together many seemingly unrelated massacres. Red became a violent, vigilante mercenary. Ace becomes an addled mystic, losing new-found friends due to inattention and incompetence. Rocky becomes lost in a life of luxury and ends up in an insane asylum.

Eventually the three reunite, and with Moffet's aid, find a strange portal near what was once Challengerville. They discover Prof and June, pregnant, "alive" in a strange "phantom zone". The dark demon confronts them and the final battle comes down to Moffet and a neutron bomb. Multi-Man sacrifices himself to destroy the demon.

"The New Challengers of the Unknown", including the ghosts of Prof and June, are poised to take on menaces in the dark corners of the world.

Later, four new Challengers pursue X-Files-like horrors. They are Clay Brody, NASCAR driver; Brenda Ruskin, physicist; Kenn Kawa, radical games designer; and Marlon Corbet, commercial pilot, who also miraculously survived a plane crash. They stopped sacrificial wackos, drug-juiced zombies, vengeful ghosts, Amazon cults, Lovecraftian monsters, mass suicides, humming buildings, and other oddities. They were advised by Rocky Davis, older and grayer and alone. It was eventually revealed that the original Challengers were dematerialized by a mad scientist's ray-weapon. The same ray caused both plane crashes, as well as others. Soon the original Challengers reappeared, helped the young Challs defeat the madman, then walked back into oblivion (minus a wounded Rocky) to shut down a runaway Tesla field. The young Challengers vowed to fight on.

Superboy discovers the missing Challengers—Ace, Red, Prof, and June—in Hypertime. The team was waging guerrilla war against Black Zero (an alternate universe version of Superboy). With Black Zero defeated, the team returns to Earth, but loses Red along the way. Reunited with Rocky in Metropolis, hosted by Rip Hunter, the original Challengers vow to explore Hypertime to find Red.

Later, on a world without superheroes, a blogger, a hip hop artist, an eco-terrorist, and two others discovers they had been genetically enhanced and chip-programmed to be soldier-pawns by the Hegemony, a cabal of billionaires who secretly run that world. Made slaves on a Moon base, three Challengers blow up the base, escape to Earth, and declare war on the Hegemony until (like the obliquely mentioned earlier Challengers) their "borrowed time" runs out.

In DC All In, the Challengers of the Unknown join the Justice League as maintenance workers on the Watchtower. The Justice League and the Challengers collaborate to investigate what happened to the universe after Darkseid's apparent death.

== Other versions ==
The Challengers make a brief appearance in the Elseworlds miniseries Conjurers, set in an alternate universe where magic is a part of mainstream society. These are the "Volume 3" Challengers, but given the nicknames of the originals: Kenn is Prof, Clay is Rocky, Brenda is Red, and Marlon is Ace.

During Superboy's trip through Hypertime, he briefly visits an Elseworld in which the Challengers were Ace, Guardian, Dubbilex, and an alternate Superboy. The June who arrives in the DCU at the end of that story is also an Elseworlds version, coming from a universe where she was a full Challenger from the beginning.

The Challengers also made brief appearances in JLA: Another Nail and The Adventures of Superman Annual #7.

They were prominently featured in Darwyn Cooke's DC: The New Frontier miniseries (2003–2004). Various members were essential in many battles against menaces that arose throughout the series.

In the 1996 crossover series Amalgam Comics, the Challengers were merged with the Fantastic Four to become Challengers of the Fantastic.

=== 1996 series (volume 3) ===
Challengers of the Unknown
- Cover of issue #4, art by John Paul Leon and Shawn Martinbrough.

Publication information
- Publisher: DC Comics (Weirdoverse)
- Schedule: Monthly
- Format: Ongoing series
- Genre: Adventure
- Publication date: February 1997 – July 1998
- No. of issues: 18
- Main character(s): Kenn Kawa, Clay Brody, Brenda Ruskin, Marlon Corbet

Creative team
- Written by: Steven Grant
- Penciller: John Paul Leon
- Inker: Shawn Martinbrough

Started as a part of DC's Weirdoverse group of titles, the 1996 series was published for a total of eighteen issues, cover dated February 1997 to July 1998. The characters were a mix of races and were, like the original group, the only survivors of a plane crash:

- Kenn Kawa: A man of Japanese heritage and originally a game designer.
- Clay Brody: A white male, originally a race car driver.
- Brenda Ruskin: A white woman, originally a physicist.
- Marlon Corbet: An African American man, originally the pilot of the plane that crashed.

The 1996 series was originally conceived as the basis for a television series that never materialized. Writer Steven Grant revealed in 2000:

COTU (as I took to calling it, to distinguish it from the Jack Kirby's original Challengers of the Unknown, nicknamed "The Challs") actually started a year earlier, when I was brought in to create a new COTU for a TV pitch DC wanted to make to Warners. Yes, it can now be told, and I freely admit, that we threw out the original team because, Space Cowboys aside, trying to pitch a concept built around four aging white guys to a TV market focused on a youth audience and pushing a veneer of multiculturalism (plenty of activist groups argue it's a pretty thin, even invisible, veneer, and they make a good case) would have been flat-out stupid, a waste of everyone's time and money. So: out with Ace, Rocky, Red and Prof; in with Brenda, Kenn, Marlon and Clay.

This team investigates paranormal disturbances across America as they are hunted by Saxon, a mystical being who also survived the plane crash that led to the team's formation. Though the series is generally unrelated to superhero conventions and the broader DC Universe, the group participated in the Superman storyline Millennium Giants and later had original Challengers member Rocky Davis as a mentor. After the comic was canceled, the characters did not appear in any comics until 2011's New 52 event that rebooted all DC Comics titles. When the Challengers appear in this new comic universe, it includes characters from the original and 1990s versions.

=== 2004 series (volume 4) ===
Challengers of the Unknown
- Cover to issue #1, art by Howard Chaykin.

Publication information
- Publisher: DC Comics
- Schedule: Monthly
- Format: Limited series
- Genre: Adventure
- Publication date: 2004
- No. of issues: 6
- Main character(s): Zach Dyamond, Tessa Crowne, Rydell Starr, Kendra Harte, Holden Crosse

Creative team
- Created by: Howard Chaykin
- Written by: Howard Chaykin
- Artist: Howard Chaykin

Collected editions
- Challengers of the Unknown: Stolen Moments, Borrowed Time: ISBN 1-4012-0941-6

The 2004 series was a six-issue limited series, written and drawn by Howard Chaykin. Unlike the other two versions, this group didn't originate in a plane crash. Instead, it was made up of survivors of a large scale terrorist attack in Long Beach, California:

- Zach Dyamond
- Tessa Crowne
- Rydell Starr
- Kendra Harte
- Holden Crosse

== Villains ==
The Challengers of the Unknown have faced an array of villains:

- Amenothoth – An ancient Egyptian villain.
- Brainiex – A sentient computer/spaceship, allied with Villo.
- Burt Langdon – A criminal who competed against the Challengers of the Unknown to obtain a wizard's deadly device.
- Chang – An Asian mastermind.
- Dakyab – An alien tyrant.
- Dane Cary – A criminal who was sabotaging the filming of Connie Baylor's latest movie.
- Darius Tiko – A scientist who discovers a time cube that lets him travel to the past and future.
- Dekkar – A villain who once used a machine to steal the memories of the Challengers of the Unknown.
- Dimension Man (D-Man) – A criminal scientist who had the ability to teleport and access other dimensions.
- Dr. Fenton – A scientist who once kidnapped June Robbins.
- Dr. Heathcliff Monroe – A scientist who worshipped M'nagalah.
- Dr. Heller – A neo-fascist who the Challengers of the Unknown encounter on a deserted island.
- Dr. Manning – A scientist who transforms into a giant caveman.
- FX-1 – A robot who became evil after being electrocuted.
- Gargoyle – "Gary Doyle" is a roof-climbing villain who meets a blind girl and planned to pay for her surgery through whatever way he can.
- General Tolek – A Tyran who led his kind to invade Earth.
- Gurk – A criminal collector who once hired Multi-Man to help find a golden turtle statuette.
- Hillary Mycroft – A criminal who sought to reassemble a sorcerer's apparatus.
- Iron Dictator – An other-dimensional version of Adolf Hitler recruited by the Dimension Man.
- Jacquard – A criminal that once challenged the Challengers of the Unknown.
- Karnak – A criminal who used potions to create monsters.
- Korba – A "man without a country" who enslaves people on an island to build his "world".
- Krager – A criminal mastermind with a hook for a left hand.
- Kubagy – An alien criminal who came to Earth to steal chlorine to power his robot.
- League of Challenger-Haters – A group of enemies that each fought the Challengers of the Unknown before joining as this group.
  - Drabny – A villain who steals inventions from the future to take over the present.
  - Kra the Living Robot – A tyrannical robot who enslaved the planet Zuna.
  - Multi-Man – A supervillain who gains a different form every time he dies.
  - Multi-Woman – A giant robot created by Multi-Man.
  - Villo – The "world's vilest villain".
  - Volcano Man – A lava monster.
- Legion of the Weird
- Malvolio – A criminal who possesses an ancient genie named Ahmed.
- Mastermind – An Earth criminal who cons Cosmo's alien master into believing that the Challengers are controlling him.
- Morlean – A sorcerer who was the first villain the Challengers of the Unknown encountered.
- Mr. Dimension – A vagrant who stole a dimensional weapon from a timeship from the far future.
- Mr. Murlin – An alchemist that unleashed a plague that turns ordinary humans into violent zombies.
- Mr. Tic-Tac-Toe – Dr. Bradford is a criminal who uses traps with a tic-tac-toe motif.
- Neutro – Starrett is an element-transmuting villain.
- Olan Tagorian – A criminal scientist whose machine can teleport monsters from other dimensions.
- Ooze – Killer Stark was accidentally changed into the Ooze during his encounter with the Challengers of the Unknown.
- Power Man – An energy-absorbing villain.
- Raymond – A robot that was given to the Challengers of the Unknown as a gift, but had ulterior motives.
- Roc – A criminal who obtained a mind-over-matter machine.
- Roney – A criminal who obtained a stone that enables him to control two creatures.
- Seekeenakee – A stone "god" and alter-ego of Multi-Man.
- Seth Gross – A wicked magician.
- Sir Rodford – A criminal who lives in a world within a mirage.
- Suboku – An alien who tricks the Challengers of the Unknown into helping him invade Earth.
- Tartan – An alien ringmaster who once captured the Challengers of the Unknown for his intergalactic circus.
- Torbert – A criminal who stole a "life liquid" from an ages-old pharaoh.
- Tukamenon – An ancient mummy who fought the Challengers of Evil on behalf of the Legion of the Weird.
- Ultivac – A giant computer robot built by an ex-Nazi scientist.
- Volcano Men – Anthropomorphic giants made of fiery lava.
- Wizard Welles – A criminal who once enlarged Rocky's cranium.
- Zardok – A criminal mystic who gained telekinesis from a meteorite.
- Zarxes – A dimensional villain who plotted to conquer Earth.
- Zog – An alien criminal.

== In other media ==
=== Television ===
- The Challengers of the Unknown appear in Batman: The Brave and the Bold, with Walter Mark "Prof" Haley voiced by Armin Shimerman, Matthew "Red" Ryan by Ioan Gruffudd, Kyle "Ace" Morgan by Armin Shimerman, and Leslie "Rocky" Davis by James Arnold Taylor.
- The Challengers of the Unknown appear in the Teen Titans Go! episode "TV Knight 4", with Kyle "Ace" Morgan voiced by Dave Stone while the other members are silent.

=== Film ===
- The Challengers of the Unknown appear in Justice League: The New Frontier, with Kyle "Ace" Morgan voiced by John Heard while the other members are silent.
- The Challengers of the Unknown appear in Teen Titans Go! To the Movies, with Kyle "Ace" Morgan voiced by Dave Stone while the other members are silent.
- The Challengers of the Unknown appear in Justice League: Crisis on Infinite Earths, with all members being silent.

=== Video games ===
The Challengers of the Unknown appear as character summons in Scribblenauts Unmasked: A DC Comics Adventure.

=== Miscellaneous ===
- A parody of the Challengers of the Unknown called the "Explorers of the Unknown" appear in Archie Comics.
- The Challengers of the Unknown appear in a self-titled novel penned by Ron Goulart. (Dell Books, ISBN 0-440-11337-7)
- The Challengers of the Unknown are referenced in The New Pornographers' song "Challengers".

== Awards ==
The 1950–1960s series won the 1967 Alley Awards for Best Non-Super-Powered Group Title and Best Normal Adventure Group.

== Collected editions ==
=== Silver Age ===
Collections of Silver Age Challengers of the Unknown comics
Title	Material collected	Year	ISBN
Challengers of the Unknown Archive Volume 1	Showcase #6–7, 11–12, Challengers of the Unknown (vol 1) #1–2	2003	978–1563899973
Challengers of the Unknown Archive Volume 2	Challengers of the Unknown (vol. 1) #3–8	2004	978-1401201531
Showcase Presents: Challengers of the Unknown, Vol. 1	Showcase #6–7, 11–12, Challengers of the Unknown (vol. 1) #1–17	2006	978-1401210878
Showcase Presents: Challengers of the Unknown, Vol. 2	Challengers of the Unknown (vol. 1) #18–37	2008	978-1401217259
Challengers Of The Unknown Omnibus by Jack Kirby	Showcase #6–7, 11–12, Challengers of the Unknown (vol. 1) #1–8	2012	978-1401234744

=== Bronze Age ===
Collections of Bronze Age Challengers of the Unknown comics
Title	Material collected	Year	ISBN
Swamp Thing: The Bronze Age Vol. 2	Swamp Thing (vol. 1) #14–24, Challengers of the Unknown (vol. 1) #81–87, DC Comics Presents #8, The Brave and the Bold (vol. 1) #122,176	2020	978-1401294229

=== Modern Age ===
Collections of Modern Age Challengers of the Unknown comics
Title	Material collected	Year	ISBN
Challengers of the Unknown Must Die!	Challengers of the Unknown (vol. 2) #1–8	2004	978-1401203740
Challengers of the Unknown: Stolen Moments, Borrowed Time	Challengers of the Unknown (vol. 4) #1–6	2006	978-1401209414
DC Universe Presents Vol. 1 featuring Deadman & Challengers of the Unknown	DC Universe Presents #1–8	2012	978-1401237165
New Challengers	New Challengers #1–6	2018	978-1401283445
