= DC: The New Frontier =

Comic book limited series by Darwyn Cooke

- Front cover of Absolute DC: The New Frontier, with art by Darwyn Cooke.

Publication information
- Publisher: DC Comics
- Schedule: monthly
- Format: Limited series
- Publication date: 2004
- No. of issues: 6
- Main character(s): Green Lantern; Martian Manhunter; Superman; Wonder Woman; Flash; Batman

Creative team
- Created by: Darwyn Cooke

DC: The New Frontier is an Eisner, Harvey, and Shuster Award-winning six-issue comic book limited series written and drawn by Darwyn Cooke, and published by DC Comics in 2004. The series was collected into two trade paperback volumes in 2004 and 2005, an Absolute Edition in 2006 and a deluxe edition in 2015. The story was adapted into an animated film, Justice League: The New Frontier, which was released on February 26, 2008.

The series was influenced by both DC Comics' long history and series like Kingdom Come, The Golden Age, Watchmen and The Dark Knight Returns. Much like The Golden Age, New Frontier is set primarily in the 1950s and depicts Golden Age superheroes Superman, Batman and Wonder Woman meeting Silver Age characters The Flash, Green Lantern and Martian Manhunter. The story bridges the gap between the end of the Golden Age and the beginning of the Silver Age in the DC Universe.

== Setting ==
The New Frontier is set between 1945 and 1960, tracing the decline of the so-called Golden Age and the beginning of the Silver Age of comic books. Golden Age characters such as Superman, Wonder Woman and Batman meet Silver Age characters, such as Martian Manhunter, Green Lantern and The Flash. Cameo appearances by President Dwight D. Eisenhower and Vice President Richard Nixon and references to the Korean War, atomic testing, the civil rights movement and the Soviet Union provide historical context. The storyline is inspired by comic books and films of the period, including the novel and film versions of Tom Wolfe's The Right Stuff. The series attempts to re-imagine and pay homage to the era of culture and political turmoil which ushered in the presidency of John F. Kennedy. The title of the comic evokes Kennedy's "New Frontier" speech.

== Plot ==
In 1945, the Losers rescue Rick Flag from an island populated by dinosaurs at the cost of their own lives. Before he dies fighting a Tyrannosaurus rex, Johnny Cloud etches a final message in a cave wall, warning those who would find it that the island is "a living thing".

After the end of World War II, McCarthyism forces various Golden Age superheroes, including the Justice Society of America, into retirement or exile. Heroes like Superman and Wonder Woman continue to operate as government agents, while Batman manages to evade capture.

Hours after the end of the Korean War, fighter pilots Hal Jordan and Kyle "Ace" Morgan clash with North Korean forces unaware of the war's end. Jordan is forced to kill a Korean soldier in self-defense, and his traumatized reaction to the ordeal makes him marked as a coward by his peers.

In 1955, Martian J'onn J'onzz is accidentally transported to Earth by scientist Saul Erdel, who suffers a fatal heart attack after seeing him. Using his shapeshifting abilities, J'onzz becomes a detective under the identity John Jones. In 1957, Jones and Slam Bradley stop a cult from sacrificing a young boy with help from Batman. Intrigued by the book the cult had been using, Jones confiscates it as evidence.

Shortly after the Flash stops a Las Vegas robbery by Captain Cold, Morgan tells Jordan about a job offer from Ferris Aircraft, which Jordan accepts. During his job interview with Carol Ferris, the two begin a relationship. Later, Morgan, Matthew Ryan, Rocky Davis, and Walter Haley survive a devastating plane crash, inspiring them to form the Challengers of the Unknown. In Knoxville, a black man named John Wilson survives a lynching by the Ku Klux Klan, taking the vigilante identity of "John Henry" to avenge his murdered family and combat the Klan.

Jordan is accepted by King Faraday to join a NASA expedition to Mars, a response to detection of Jones's arrival to Earth. Meanwhile, Jones is confronted by Batman, who gives him a medallion that the cult leader was wearing. Using the medallion to unlock the cult's book, Jones discovers the presence of an alien entity known as "The Centre", which is pulling humanity's psyche into its thrall. Jones later discovers that a rocket to Mars is being constructed, and is tempted to return home after witnessing humanity's fear and hate towards different races.

Later, John Henry is captured, tortured, and murdered by the Klan. Soon after, the Flash, having survived an attempted capture by Faraday, publicly announces his retirement out of disillusionment. These events convince Jones to accept that he will never have a place among humans, making him decide to return home via the rocket.

As the rocket prepares launch, Jones is caught by Faraday when he attempts to board. Faraday is knocked unconscious in the struggle and Jones is forced to abandon his chance to return to Mars to save him. As Jones is captured by Faraday, Superman and the Challengers attempt to rescue Flag, but the nuclear payload on board explodes, killing Flag. Abin Sur, who was mortally wounded in the explosion, declares Jordan his successor as Green Lantern and gives him his ring before dying from his injuries.

Themyscira is attacked by the Centre as it travels towards the American east coast. Lois Lane unveils the Centre to the world in a broadcast, prompting many to gather in an attempt to help defeat the creature, including Green Arrow, Adam Strange, Ray Palmer, the Blackhawks, the Sea Devils, Hal Jordan, and Barry Allen, who comes out of retirement.

Jones is overwhelmed by the psychic attack from the Centre and briefly falls under its control, but Faraday sacrifices himself by absorbing the mental strain and is killed. The Flash uses Ray Palmer's white dwarf lens to shrink the Centre by rapidly running across its surface. Jordan uses his ring to contain the Centre in a bubble and throws it into orbit, where it is destroyed.

The book ends with a montage of a new age of heroes narrated with the eponymous "New Frontier" speech by John F. Kennedy, as well as the formation of the Justice League of America as it battles Starro.

== Continuity ==
New Frontier includes elements of the Golden and Silver Ages which did not appear until the 1970s. Many characters appeared as they did when they were created, and were not retconned to fit the era and story. Barry Allen becomes the Flash in 1956 (the year of his first appearance in the comics) and Hal Jordan acquires the power ring and becomes Green Lantern in 1959, the same year that story was published.

Although Cooke said that New Frontier took place in the pre-Crisis on Infinite Earths continuity, he did not use the period-accurate Earth-One and Earth-Two Multiverse concepts; he used a post-Crisis continuity variant, where Golden and Silver Age heroes exist in a unified timeline rather than separate realities. The New Frontier universe was one of the 52 Earths in the DC multiverse (Earth-21).

== Style ==
The New Frontier's style has several influences: Jack Kirby's squared fingers, muscles and jaws; the clean lines of Golden Age-era comics; the Fleischer Superman cartoons; Batman: The Animated Series, and other shows in the DC Animated Universe; Cooke was an artist on many of the latter. His style resembles that of Bruce Timm.

== Awards ==
The series received Eisner Awards for Best Limited Series, Best Coloring and Best Publication Design, Harvey Awards for Best Artist, Best Colorist and Best Continuing or Limited Series and received the Shuster Award for Outstanding Canadian Comic Book Cartoonist (Writer-Artist). In 2007, when the series was released as an Absolute Edition, it received an Eisner Award for Best Graphic Album (Reprint) and a Harvey Award for Best Graphic Album of Previously Published Work.

== In other media ==
The story was adapted as a direct-to-video animated film called Justice League: The New Frontier, written by Stan Berkowitz and produced by Bruce Timm with Darwyn Cooke as story and visual consultant. Rated PG-13, it was released in the United States on February 26, 2008 on DVD, HD DVD, Blu-ray and pay-per-view.

== Collections ==
As of January 2026, the series has been collected in two softcover collections, an Absolute Edition, a deluxe edition, a DC Black Label Edition, and a DC Compact Comics Edition:

- DC: The New Frontier: Volume One (#1-3; ISBN 1401203507)
- DC: The New Frontier: Volume Two (#4-6; ISBN 1401204619)
- DC: The New Frontier: Absolute Edition (#1-6; ISBN 1401210805)
- DC: The New Frontier Absolute Edition: 15th Anniversary Edition (#1-6, behind-the-scenes material, material from Solo #5, and the Justice League: The New Frontier Special; ISBN 978-1779501394
- DC: The New Frontier: Deluxe Edition (#1-6, material from DC The New Frontier: Absolute Edition, and the Justice League: The New Frontier Special; ISBN 1401248888)
- DC: The New Frontier (DC Black Label Edition) (#1-6, behind-the-scenes material, and the Justice League: The New Frontier Special; ISBN 1401290922)
- DC: The New Frontier (DC Compact Comics Edition) (#1-6; ISBN 9781799502340)

== Merchandise ==
DC Direct first released a line of action figures based on the series in July 2006:

- Wave 1 - Blackhawk, Green Arrow, Green Lantern, Superman, and Wonder Woman (July 2006)
- Wave 2 - Batman, Dr. Fate, Martian Manhunter and The Flash (December 12, 2007)

A box set of Batman, Superman, Green Lantern and Wonder Woman (with a new head), including a reprint of Justice League: The New Frontier Special, was released in April 2009.

== Sequels ==
- Solo #5 (2005), written and drawn by Darwyn Cooke, included a short story ("Triangulation: A New Frontier Thriller", also known as "King of America") with King Faraday set in pre-revolutionary Cuba.
- Justice League: The New Frontier Special was released in May 2008 as a follow-up to the Justice League: The New Frontier DVD. Stories included Batman vs. Superman, a post-New Frontier story where Robin teams up with Kid Flash for the first time and a Mad Magazine-style story with Wonder Woman and Black Canary.
