= Scare Tactics (comics) =

1996 DC Comics series

- Cover of issue #1; art by Anthony Williams and Andy Lanning.

Publication information
- Publisher: DC Comics
- Publication date: December 1996 – March 1998
- No. of issues: 12

Creative team
- Written by: Len Kaminski

Scare Tactics is a comic book series published by DC Comics. A total of twelve issues were published, dated from December 1996 to March 1998. The series, written by Len Kaminski, was a part of DC's Weirdoverse group of titles.

== Fictional biography ==
The series focused on the band Scare Tactics, teenage monsters who escaped from government custody and decided to hide in plain sight by becoming traveling rock and roll musicians, trying to escape their pasts while encountering supernatural adventures on the road.

The band members consisted of:

- Arnold Burnsteel (manager/bus driver) - A conspiracy theorist who rescued the rest of the cast from the top secret R-Complex facility in New Mexico with the help of his friend Jared Stevens.
- Fang (lead guitarist Jake Ketchum) - A hard-rocking hillbilly werewolf originating from the Appalachian Mountains. He fled from an arranged marriage meant to end his family's long-running feud with the rival Knightsbridge family.
- Gross-Out (drummer Philbert Hoskins) - A bullied fat kid obsessed with astronomy who was mutated by meteorite radiation into a grey sludge monster. Despite his revolting appearance and inability to talk clearly, he is intelligent, goodhearted and extremely loyal to his bandmates. Philbert eventually evolves into a god-like being and flies off to be among the stars.
- Scream Queen (lead singer Nina Skorzeny) - A cynical vampire from Markovia who came to the United States to escape the "ethnic cleansing" of her kind. She can transform into a black cat.
- Slither (bass guitarist James Tilton) - A human-reptile hybrid who was transformed by his father, a biochemist, as part of his medical experiments. He secretly has a crush on Nina, but fears hurting her and his friends.

== Promotion ==
In an attempt to promote the series, Kaminski planned to organize a "real-life ST fan club package", which would've included, among other things, a cassette recording of a song by the fictional band. Though he went as far as hiring a band and producing cassettes out-of-pocket, DC put a stop to his unlicensed plan before distribution took place.

DC Comics promoted the book in the middle of the series’ run through their "Plus" line, a series of one-shots that paired the characters with other notable DC characters:

- Catwoman Plus #1 (featuring Scream Queen)
- Impulse Plus #1 (featuring Gross-Out)
- Robin Plus #2 (featuring Fang)
- Superboy Plus #2 (featuring Slither)
