= Howard Sherman (cricketer) =

English cricketer

Personal information
- Full name: Howard Richard Sherman
- Born: 15 June 1943 (age 83); Seven Kings, Essex, England
- Batting: Right-handed
- Bowling: Right-arm off break

Domestic team information
- Years: Team
- 1967–1969: Essex

Career statistics
Competition	First-class	List A
Matches	13	1
Runs scored	448	2
Batting average	24.88	2.00
100s/50s	–/4	–/–
Top score	66	2
Balls bowled	42	–
Wickets	–	–
Bowling average	–	–
5 wickets in innings	–	–
10 wickets in match	–	–
Best bowling	–	–
Catches/stumpings	4/–	–/–
- Source: Cricinfo, 25 October 2011

Howard Richard Sherman (born 15 June 1943) is a former English cricketer. Sherman was a right-handed batsman who bowled right-arm off break. He was born at Seven Kings, Essex.

Sherman made his first-class debut for Essex against Cambridge University in 1967. He made twelve further first-class appearances for the county, the last of which came against Surrey in the 1969 County Championship. In his thirteen first-class appearances, he scored 448 runs at a batting average of 24.88, with a high score of 66. This score, which was one of four half centuries he made, came against Nottinghamshire in 1967. He also made a single List A appearance against Somerset at Johnson Park in the 1969 Player's County League. He scored 2 runs in this match before being dismissed by Peter Robinson, with Somerset winning by 2 wickets.
