= Multi-Man =

- Multi-Man as seen in Joker: The Last Laugh, Secret Files and Origins (December 2001).

Publication information
- Publisher: DC Comics
- First appearance: Challengers of the Unknown #14 (June–July 1960)

In-story information
- Alter ego: Duncan Pramble
- Species: Metahuman
- Team affiliations: Injustice League; Justice League Antarctica; League of Challenger-Haters; Suicide Squad
- Notable aliases: Mister Voodoo
- Abilities: Resurrection; Genius-level intellect

Multi-Man (Duncan Pramble) is a fictional character that has been both a superhero and a supervillain in DC Comics comic books, primarily as a villain for the Challengers of the Unknown. His first appearance was in Challengers of the Unknown #14 (July 1960), and the character quickly became a recurring enemy. He appeared in at least one issue a year through 1968. In 1965, Multi-Man brought several of the Challengers' enemies together to form the League of Challenger-Haters.

== Fictional character biography ==
Originally an enemy of the Challengers of the Unknown, Duncan Pramble consumes a substance known as "Liquid Light" found in an ancient temple. The effect of this substance is that whenever he dies, he resurrects with a different, random superpower, often becoming an energy being or monster. The side effect of this is that his head grows disproportionately large (with pointed ears and large eyes) and his body becomes small and weak. For years, he is one of the Challengers' most persistent foes, the founder of the League of Challenger-Haters and the creator of the giant android Multi-Woman. With the Challenger-Haters, he also battles the Doom Patrol on one occasion.

With several other villains, Multi-Man becomes a member of the Injustice League, a team of out-of-luck supervillains who, when banding together, become even less successful than in their individual careers. During this time, he reveals that his many deaths and resurrections have left him with a form of bipolar disorder. Trying to reform, the Injustice League's members later become the core of the equally laughable hero team Justice League Antarctica. Like his compatriots, Multi-Man becomes an ardent supporter of Maxwell Lord, partly because he is the only one willing to hire them.

=== Death and redemption ===
Multi-Man drifts away from the League and becomes a supermarket bagger. During the 1991 Challengers of the Unknown mini-series, he is prompted by the seeming 'personification of all evil' to destroy Challenger Mountain with a bomb. This bomb, combined with the energies of the evil entity, kills hundreds of civilians and two of the Challengers themselves. As the Challengers and their ally Moffet are confronting the entity, Multi-Man takes a neutron bomb from Moffet's hands and dives into the creature's mouth, apparently killing them both.

Multi-Man, now taller and fitter, is eventually 'volunteered' for the Suicide Squad by his former Injustice League ally, Major Disaster. On their first mission, he is shot dead during a battle against a mad scientist and his biologically created servants.

Later, he has returned to life and was a part of the Joker: Last Laugh crossover in which the Joker killed him hundreds of times until he possesses the power required to break his collar and give the villains the chance to reach Doctor Polaris. The Slab's two surviving guards are forced to repeat the process after the villain Black Mass is killed after shifting the entire Slab into an alternate dimension in the hopes that Multi-Man would manifest an ability that could be used to undo Black Mass's actions. Multi-Man eventually gains the ability to reanimate dead tissue, restoring Black Mass to life to reverse the process. Multi-Man is subsequently given light duties in the Slab for his assistance.

== Powers and abilities ==
Multi-Man consumed a Liquid Light serum that gave him the power to be instantly resurrected after dying, each time with extraordinary new abilities. These powers he have obtained include (but are not limited to) the following:

- Telepathy
- Empathy for others' pain
- Super conductive skin
- Blood turns metal to acid
- Body can become two-dimensional
- Involuntary shrinking
- Reanimating dead tissue
- Enlarged cranium
