= Justice League: The New Frontier =

2008 animated superhero film by Dave Bullock

- DVD cover
- Directed by: Dave Bullock
- Written by: Stan Berkowitz; Darwyn Cooke (additional material)
- Based on: DC: The New Frontier by: Darwyn Cooke
- Starring: David Boreanaz; Miguel Ferrer; Neil Patrick Harris; John Heard; Lucy Lawless; Kyle MacLachlan; Phil Morris; Kyra Sedgwick; Brooke Shields; Jeremy Sisto
- Edited by: Elen Orson
- Music by: Kevin Manthei
- Production companies: Warner Premiere; DC Comics; Warner Bros. Animation (Note: Animation outsourced to Dong Woo Animation)
- Distributed by: Warner Home Video
- Release date: February 26, 2008
- Running time: 75 minutes
- Country: United States
- Language: English

Justice League: The New Frontier is a 2008 American animated superhero film both based on DC: The New Frontier, an Eisner, Harvey, and Shuster Award-winning six-issue limited series published by DC Comics and the superhero team the Justice League. The film was written by Stan Berkowitz, with Darwyn Cooke providing additional material.

The film received a rating of PG-13 for violent content and images, and was released on February 26, 2008. It is the second film of the DC Universe Animated Original Movies by Warner Bros. Animation.

The film had its broadcast premiere on October 18, 2008 on Cartoon Network. It was broadcast again on December 20, 2020 on Cartoon Network's nighttime Adult Swim programming block through Toonami, as a celebration for the then-upcoming release of Wonder Woman 1984.

== Plot ==
An unknown entity, named "The Centre," is born from the Earth itself and witnesses the evolution and extinction of the dinosaurs, and human evolution. Due to humanity's capacity for war and violence, the Centre concludes that they must be eradicated.

At the end of the Korean War, United States Air Force pilot Hal Jordan and his wingman, Kyle "Ace" Morgan, are attacked by enemy pilots but survive. In Gotham City, Saul Erdel accidentally teleports J'onn J'onzz, the last surviving Green Martian, to Earth, and dies from fright after seeing him. Unable to return, J'onn disguises himself as Erdel, learning about Earth from television. In Las Vegas, Barry Allen – also known as the Flash – is at a casino when Captain Cold arrives to commit a robbery; he races from Central City to confront Cold. Flash finds Cold's bombs and captures him, before the latter is possessed by an entity.

Two years later, J'onn has taken on the identity of John Jones and become a detective with the Gotham City Police Department, investigating a doomsday cult that worships the "Centre" and has kidnapped a child for a human sacrifice ritual. J'onn and his partner Slam Bradley join Batman in battling the cult, but a fire briefly incapacitates the former. The cult leader is possessed by the entity, and warns of impending judgment. Meanwhile, Hal is training under Rick Flag at Ferris Aircraft for a government project to build a spacecraft for travel to Mars, overseen by special agent King Faraday.

Batman, having deduced J'onn's alien nature, approaches him and suggests that they work together to investigate the cult. After being attacked and nearly subdued by the US government, a disillusioned Flash announces his retirement. J'onn interrogates former Ferris employee Harry Leiter, apprehended for murder while under The Centre's influence, who mentions the launch to Mars. Seeing the jubilant albeit contemptuous response to the Flash's retirement, J'onn gives his research to Batman and plans to return to Mars on the rocket. However, he is confronted by Faraday on the launchpad, as the rocket is damaged and malfunctions. Hal wants to attempt a landing but Flag reveals weapons of mass destruction are on board, intended to destroy all life on Mars. Hal is ejected from the cockpit and saved by Superman; Flag detonates the rocket as J'onn is imprisoned after having saved Faraday from the rocket's exhaust and getting incapacitated again by the fire.

On Paradise Island, Wonder Woman is training with Mala when the Centre attacks. As a result of Flag's rocket explosion, a fatally wounded Abin Sur crash-lands on Earth, gives his ring to Hal, and mentions the Centre. Meanwhile, Superman and Batman review J'onn's research. Wonder Woman's invisible jet crashes at Cape Canaveral and she warns Superman that the Centre is coming. J'onn decides to help save Earth after his hope for humanity is renewed, as the Centre, a flying island guarded by an army of mutant dinosaurs, begins its attack on America. The Flash, Green Arrow, Adam Strange, the Challengers of the Unknown, and the Blackhawks join forces to defend the Cape, as Superman is seemingly killed. The heroes eventually plan a frontal assault to provide cover for Hal and Ace while they fly a bombing mission into the Centre. At the same time, the Flash will use Ray Palmer's reduction ray to shrink it.

The aerial assault is nearly outmatched, and as dinosaurs ambush Faraday's ground forces, the Centre's psychic force briefly overwhelms J'onn. Faraday is captured by a dinosaur, and sacrifices himself to kill it with a grenade. Hal and Ace shoot their way into the Centre's core but a hallucinogenic attack disorients them; Ace detonates his payload as Hal finally becomes Green Lantern and rescues him. The Flash leaps onto the Centre's surface and covers it on foot, shrinking the island before Hal brings it into space, where it explodes. As the team celebrates their victory, Aquaman emerges from a submarine carrying Superman. The world celebrates the Centre's defeat with a ceremony. The Justice League is later born.

== Cast ==
- David Boreanaz as Hal Jordan / Green Lantern
- Miguel Ferrer as J'onn J'onzz / John Jones / Martian Manhunter
- Neil Patrick Harris as Barry Allen / The Flash
- John Heard as Ace Morgan
- Lucy Lawless as Diana Prince / Wonder Woman
- Kyle MacLachlan as Kal-El / Clark Kent / Superman
- Lex Lang as Rick Flag, Arthur Curry / Aquaman
- Phil Morris as King Faraday
- Kyra Sedgwick as Lois Lane
- Brooke Shields as Carol Ferris
- Jeremy Sisto as Bruce Wayne / Batman
- Joe Alaskey as Bugs Bunny (cameo)
- Jeff Bennett as Sportscaster
- Corey Burton as Abin Sur, Ray Palmer
- Townsend Coleman as Dr. Magnus
- Keith David as The Centre
- Sean Donnellan as Haley
- Robin Atkin Downes as The Guardian
- Shane Haboucha as Dick Grayson / Robin
- David Hunt as Harry
- Vicki Lewis as Iris West
- Joe Mantegna as Crooner
- Vanessa Marshall as Amazon Woman
- Jim Meskimen as Slam Bradley
- James Arnold Taylor as Captain Cold
- Alan Ritchson as Aquaman (uncredited)
- John F. Kennedy as himself (archival audio)

== Production ==
=== Music ===
Justice League: The New Frontier (Soundtrack from the DC Universe Animated Original Movie)

Film score by Kevin Manthei
- Released: March 18, 2008
- Genre: Score
- Length: 56:53
- Label: La-La Land Records
- Producer: Kevin Manthei

Like Superman: Doomsday, Justice League: The New Frontier had a soundtrack released by La-La Land Records on March 18, 2008. The music was composed by Kevin Manthei, the track listing is as follows.

No.	Title	Length
1.	"Main Titles"	2:01
2.	"The Centre / Hal Shot Down"	2:50
3.	"J'onn J'onzz Arrives"	0:51
4.	"Wonder Woman Recounts / J'onzz Watches TV"	2:11
5.	"The Flash Saves Las Vegas"	3:32
6.	"J'onn Becomes John / Church Brawl"	3:12
7.	"Carol & Hal Banter"	0:22
8.	"Driving to Ferris / The Real Ferris"	1:34
9.	"Hal's Mission Revealed / Batman Surprises J'onzz / The Flash Fights Gorilla"	2:52
10.	"Crazy Scientist"	1:37
11.	"J'onzz Contemplates / J'onzz Is Leaving"	1:18
12.	"To Space"	1:27
13.	"Mars Mission Mess"	4:13
14.	"New Green Lantern"	3:56
15.	"Superman Ties It Up / J'onzz Bonds"	2:41
16.	"Island Revealed / Superman Down"	5:22
17.	"Plan to Action"	2:35
18.	"Thick of Battle"	4:32
19.	"The Flash vs. Centre / Last Bit of Business"	3:37
20.	"Victory"	3:09
21.	"End Credits"	3:01

== Home media ==
Justice League: The New Frontier is available from Warner Bros. Home Entertainment on Digital and in single and two-disc editions. The DVD cover of the single disc includes the panoramic image from the film, while the two-disc, DVD Special Edition, HD DVD and Blu-ray commemorative editions have an image of Superman, Batman and Wonder Woman above the title logo with other characters below it. Best Buy had an exclusive deal which included a Green Lantern action figure from DC Direct with the DVD package. Wal-Mart had an exclusive single DVD package with "The New Frontier Green Lantern" CD-ROM Comic Book inside. The single, two-disc and Blu-ray editions were released on February 26, 2008, with the HD DVD edition released on March 18, 2008. In October 2017 WBHE released the Commemorative Edition of the film on Blu-ray combo pack, Blu-ray steelbook and DVD.

The special features include a documentary on the 47-year history of the Justice League, commentaries, a documentary on the early mythological villain archetypes in the Justice League stories, a featurette on the themes, elements from the comic to film versions of New Frontier, three episodes of Justice League Unlimited and a 10-minute preview of the animated film; Batman: Gotham Knight. Variety said that pre-orders for The New Frontier were greater than expected at that time.

== Tie-in Media ==
On March 5, 2008, a one-shot called Justice League: The New Frontier Special was published. Written by Darwyn Cooke and penciled by Cooke, Dave Bullock, and J. Bone, the comic is an anthology consisting of various tales set within the events of the film. In the comic, Batman goes to war with Superman after the latter is ordered by King Faraday and President Eisenhower to arrest him for his vigilante activities, Robin and Kid Flash team up to prevent Soviet saboteurs from harming the President, while Wonder Woman and Black Canary look to calm the sexist natures of various male patrons within a new Gotham club.

== Reception ==
Justice League: The New Frontier received mostly positive reviews. Screener copies were sent to website reviewers a month before the DVD's official release. Most of the reviews were positive. Newsarama reviewed the film, saying that it was "one of the best things to ever come out of [Bruce] Timm's stable", and said that the acting was exceptional. The World's Finest, a fansite dealing with DC Animations, said that it was "the first animated feature in a long time that I've felt completely satisfied while walking away from." A reviewer from Ain't It Cool News said that it was "my favorite film of 2008", and that it was "everything I had hoped for." Mainstream websites made similar comments; IGN gave the film and DVD a total score of 7.0, ENI said it was enjoyable, and DVDTalk.com said it was "recommended".

The film earned $5,737,302 from domestic DVD sales.

=== Awards and nominations ===
Award	Category	Recipients	Result
Annie Awards	Best Home Entertainment Production	Justice League: The New Frontier	Nominated
Golden Reel Awards	Best Sound Editing – Direct to Video	Timothy J. Borquez, Thomas Syslo, Mark Keatts, Kevin Manthei, Diane Greco, Sean Rowe, Eric Freeman, Doug Andham, Keith Dickens, Tony Orozco, Daisuke Sawa, Kelly Ann Foley, Mike Garcia and Mark Keefer	Nominated
Primetime Emmy Awards	Outstanding Animated Program (for Programming One Hour Or More)	Bruce Timm, Sander Schwartz, Michael Goguen, Dave Bullock, Stan Berkowitz, Darwyn Cooke and James T. Walker	Nominated
