= Star Hawkins =

- Star Hawkins and Ilda, art by Vince Colletta.

Publication information
- Publisher: National Comics (DC Comics)
- First appearance: Strange Adventures #114 (March 1960)
- Created by: John Broome (writer); Mike Sekowsky (artist)

In-story information
- Abilities: A seasoned detective.

Star Hawkins is a science fiction detective character appearing in media published by DC Comics, primarily their flagship science-fiction anthology title Strange Adventures. He and his ever-present robot assistant Ilda first appeared in Strange Adventures #114 (March 1960) and featured in 21 issues of the title, but after that only made four other appearances in other DC Comics before he was killed off in Mystery In Space vol 2 #2 (December 2006). The characters were created by John Broome and Mike Sekowsky.

== Publication history ==
Star Hawkins appeared in 21 issues of Strange Adventures, first in the story "The Case of the Martian Witness" in Strange Adventures #114 (March 1960), written by creator John Broome and drawn by co-creator Mike Sekowsky and Bernard Sachs under the editorship of Julius Schwartz. A series of 8/9-page stories was then published in rotation with two other series, The Atomic Knights and Space Museum, and appeared in every third issue of Strange Adventures from #119 - 158 (August 1960 - November 1963), all by the Broome-Sekowsky-Sachs team, and #162 (March 1964), written by France Herron. After Jack Schiff took up the editorial reins on Strange Adventures he brought Star Hawkins back in issue #173 (February 1965), featuring him again in every third issue until #185 (February 1966), this time all written by Dave Wood and drawn by Gil Kane. Star Hawkins never featured on the cover of Strange Adventures.

He later appeared in "Whatever will Happen to Star Hawkins" in DC Comics Presents #33 (May 1981), an 8-page tale by Mike Tiefenbacher (a freelance writer who was then editor of comics magazine The Comic Reader (TCR)), with artists Alex Saviuk and Vince Colletta. Star Hawkins' only other appearances were in the non-canonical mini-series Twilight (1990) by Howard Chaykin and his death in the mini-series Mystery in Space vol 2 #2 (December 2006), written by Jim Starlin.

== Fictional character biography ==
Star Hawkins is a down-at-heel private investigator living in New City, Earth, in the 21st century. He is first shown in 2079, with a robot receptionist, cleaner and general dogsbody, Ilda (Robot F2324), bought from the Super-Secretary Robot Factory. Because Star is always short of money, Ilda is regularly pawned (although Star always promises that was the last time). Although a sharp detective with athletic skills, it is normally Ilda who exhibits the intelligence and power to solve the crime or is critical to defeating the "zips" (criminals), using low-powered telepathic ability as a standard equipment in all models the year of Ilda's manufacture or other robot powers.

His first known case comes when he is paid to hunt for a Martian who had been paid to go into hiding to avoid being a witness over the ownership of a jewel mine, which he solves on his own. However, for his next cases it is Ilda who accidentally cracks a betting and forgery scam, and uncovers a robot theft scam when pawned once again, then steps in and takes the next job when Star is injured while fighting the Metal Men of Andromeda. Eventually Star's reputation gets work from the National Science Center, Earth's law-enforcement agency, although it does not solve his perennial money problems.

Star Hawkins cases often have a humorous edge to them - once Ilda accidentally cleans the wrong apartment (in 2079 everyone has an identical apartment with the same furniture and accessories in the same place) and breaks up an alien invasion plan being plotted in the flat above - apartment upstairs. She diagnoses a robot criminal as mad because he literally falls in love with a robot that is part of an alien invasion plan, and attempts a film career (as Scarlet O'Toole in 'Gone With the Rust' - with a robot that looks like Cary Grant), although she was only being duped for her information on Star.

Ilda cracks another case when, jealous of Star's attention to a stunning blonde, accidentally discovers an interplanetary spy ring, although her 'Intuition Tubes' were wrong for once - the blonde was not one of the gang but an undercover agent for the government who had infiltrated them. Shortly afterwards Ilda gets a massive electric shock which scrambles her circuits into thinking she's the criminal The Slinker from Saturn. They come up against one group of space terrorists, the League of Five Planets, more than once; thwarting a plan to steal security codes and attack Earth's outer planetary bases and then defeating them again in their last ever case more than fifteen years later.

On three occasions, by blind luck Star Hawkins and Ilda become catalysts for significant changes to robot rights. Ilda is saved from being scrapped, having reached the end of her robot model's life, reprieved by the Government in recognition of her usefulness in crime solving. Both her and Star receive a Medal of Valor and incidentally save all other robots of her model from the obsolescence law. Star and Ilda are also instrumental in changing apartheid-style rules when solving a case in a resort hotel in the asteroid belt. Prior to this case, robots were classed as servants and not allowed in hotels but forced to stay outside. After Ilda smuggles herself into the hotel and Star and her prevent a crime, the law is repealed. Their third piece of legal history comes when Star retires and all robots are given their freedom and the right to 'life-pairing' because of Ilda's heroism.

Star Hawkins retires in 2092, after defeating the 'League of Five Planets' again and earning 250 million credits reward. He marries Stella Sterling, a girl he had been guarding during this last case, and a descendant of Prof. Miller Sterling, the creator of Automan, while Ilda marries Automan. They open the 'Hawkins-Sterling Academy of Robot Detection', and Automan and Ilda become Head of Faculty, training robots as private detectives.

At some stage after this Star is transported back to the 20th century, although how and why is unknown. Eventually he takes up living on Hardcore Station, a corrupt commercial satellite station with a population of several million in a free space zone between a number of trading civilisations. Now a tragic figure, he lives near the Stardocks an old man watching ships take off and land. Star has lost his private investigator license, is down on his luck again and a drunk - Captain Comet is his only known friend. Nobody is sure who or what he was, Comet describes him as "more than a bit crazy, always claiming he was from the future whenever he got drunk". Ilda hangs broken in his room like a puppet; although Comet offers to help fix her, Star won't because "we'd never be able to get the ol' gal the way she was - and the Star Hawkins she knew is ancient history. Wouldn't want her to see me ... like ..." Star Hawkins is murdered shortly afterwards by a rogue telepath.

== Powers and abilities ==
Star Hawkins has no powers, he is an ordinary human. On the other hand, he does have a sharp mind and a keen eye, and is athletic and physically quick, and carries a ray gun. He is known to use an instant disguise spray to look like an old man.

Ilda is highly intelligent, and able to use a range of robot abilities - strength, supersonics, and can shoot electric bolts and use heat powers by overloading her transistors or using an Infra-Red beam (normally used for emergency cooking). She has Super-X vision, which enables her to see through walls, a certain measure of telepathic ability and "Intuition tubes" which warn her of danger (mainly from other females). She is immune to ray-shots and can forensically analyze soil samples.

== Other versions ==
A version of Star Hawkins appears in the 1990 miniseries Twilight, by Howard Chaykin and José Luis García-López. In this version his real name is Axel Starker, the estranged brother of Jon Starker, Manhunter 2070. He is bitter and twisted, with a deep resentment of Ilda, telling her he would have junked her years ago if he'd been allowed to. Eventually Jon merges with Ilda, and is killed on an attack on the crazed dictator Tommy Tomorrow.

Hawkins also appears in a backup feature for DC's 2013 Threshold comic by Keith Giffen. Working on the planet Tolerance as a private investigator, Hawkins is accompanied by Ilda - a multi-function robot servant and bodyguard (described as a 'Gal Friday'), who is implanted with the personality of Hawkins' ex-wife Ilda. Ilda is destroyed multiple times throughout the comic, which is implied to be a regular occurrence - Hawkins simply orders a new robot and implants it with a fresh copy of Ilda's personality. Again down on his luck, Hawkins continually narrates his adventures to the audience - and occasionally out-loud.

== Reprints ==
One Star Hawkins story is reprinted in the trade paperback anthology Pulp Fiction Library: Mystery in Space. DC Comics. 1999. ISBN 1-56389-494-7..

A Star Hawkins story is reprinted in the trade paperback anthology Mysteries in Space: The Best of DC Science Fiction Comics. Simon and Schuster, New York. 1980. ISBN 0-671 24775 1..
