= Star Rovers =

Scienc fiction comic book

- The three Star Rovers, art by Sid Greene.

Publication information
- Publisher: DC Comics
- First appearance: Mystery in Space #66 (March 1961)
- Created by: Gardner Fox (writer); Sid Greene (artist)

In-story information
- Member(s): Homer Glint; Rick Purvis; Karel Sorensen

"Star Rovers" is a science fiction American comic book feature published by DC Comics between 1961 and 1964. The feature first appeared in seven issues of DC's science-fiction anthology comic Mystery in Space, followed by two issues of DC's companion science-fiction title Strange Adventures. The characters were created by writer Gardner Fox and artist Sid Greene, who were responsible for all nine stories.

== Publication history ==
Mystery in Space was an anthology comic book that featured short science fiction stories together with a number of ongoing features. The first Star Rovers story, "Who Caught the Loborilla?" (Mystery in Space #66, March 1961) is not bannered as a Star Rovers story as such. In an editorial in the reprint title DC Super-Stars '#8 (Oct. 1976), titled DC Super-Stars Of Space, DC editor Jack C. Harris states that the Star Rovers were not at that point designed as a series, and "Who Caught the Loborilla?" was written as a standalone story. However, the characters returned three issues later in "What Happened on Sirius-4?" (Mystery In Space #69, Aug. 1961), and then due to public demand became a regular series under the "Star Rovers" title. The team appeared a further five times in Mystery in Space, every third issue, before switching to DC's other science fiction anthology title, Strange Adventures, for "Will the Star Rovers Abandon Earth?" (Strange Adventures #159, Dec. 1963) and one last appearance in that title, "How Can Time Be Stopped?" (Strange Adventures #163, April 1964), after which the series ended. The first two stories were eight-page tales; this was extended to 10 pages from the third story onward.

DC later reprinted the first four Star Rovers stories in Strange Adventures #232-236 (Oct. 1971 - June 1972). The last five stories were reprinted in DC's science fiction reprint title From Beyond the Unknown #18-22 Sept. 1972 - May 1973). The fifth story, "Who Saved the Earth?", from Mystery in Space #80, was later issued in another reprint title, DC Super-Stars #8.

The characters played a critical part in the three-part comic-book miniseries Twilight by Howard Chaykin and José Luis García-López (Twilight, Books I-III, Dec. 1990 - Feb. 1991) and the associated graphic novel Ironwolf, Fires of the Revolution (1992). The team has since made only one further appearance, in Starman vol. 2, #55 (July 1999), by writers James Robinson and David S. Goyer, with penciler Peter Snejbjerg.

In The New 52 reboot of DC's continuity, the Star Rovers are re-introduced as smugglers, first appearing in Green Lantern: New Guardians Annual #1 (March 2013). The characters have retained their original names, with a new addition to the team, Chuddu. In their first appearance, they are tasked with smuggling Carol Ferris, Arkillo, and Saint Walker into Lady Styx' Tenebrian Dominion. However, they decide to sell them to scouts, for the Hunted, a game show competition. The Star Rovers next appear in the backup feature of Threshold from #2 (April 2013) to #5 (July 2013), starring Larfleeze. They are hired by Larfleeze, to help him find his missing treasures.

== Characters ==
The lead characters in Star Rovers were three 22nd century adventurers named Homer Glint, a novelist and sportsman, Karel Sorensen, a former Miss Solar System winner who was now a space-adventurer, and playboy Rick Purvis. These three characters were not depicted as a team; instead, they would meet under varied circumstances, usually competing for a prize or award, and encounter difficulties in their individual efforts. The hook of most of the Star Rover stories was that each character would have a different viewpoint on the problem and come up with his or her own solution; sometimes none of them are right, while sometimes they all are. The characters then get together and pool their experiences and resources to win the day, often saving Earth or some other planet or civilization as a result.

Sorensen is unusual in early 1960s comics as she is depicted as a strong, intelligent female on an equal footing with the male characters. Otherwise, there is little character development in the stories, with the exception of "Where Was I Born - Venus? Mars? Jupiter?", in Mystery in Space #77 (Aug. 1962), which gives some information on the Star Rovers' individual backgrounds.

== Other appearances ==
After 1964, other than a one-panel appearance in The History of the DC Universe (Book 2, 1986), and an entry in Who's Who: The Definitive Directory Of The DC Universe #22 (Dec. 1986), no further mention of the Star Rovers was made until a new reading of the trio played a critical part in the three-part comic-book miniseries Twilight by Howard Chaykin and José Luis García-López (Twilight, Books I-III, Dec. 1990 - Feb. 1991).

A makeover for most of DC's 1950s and 1960s science fiction characters, Twilight depicts a savage, relentlessly militaristic universe for these hapless characters, far removed from their simple 1960s universes. The characters are significantly twisted (physically and psychologically) from their heroic earlier incarnations. Beginning with the wars between humans and a resistance formed by robotics-augmented animals and mutant cyborgs, man's future history is narrated (in framing sequences for each issue) by an ancient Homer Glint, once of the Star Rovers, who is quickly established as a former spin-doctor for the human government. Glint tells how Rick Purvis double-crossed and killed a gorilla leader of the animal/automaton matrix live on an intergalactic broadcast, and, through Glint's engineering of the story, became a figurehead for massed human hatred of the non-human alliance. Glint also worked for an intergalactic news agency. Furthermore, he also manipulated the image of the fascist military ruler Tommy Tomorrow image in a similar way earlier during the war, and that Purvis and Karel Sorenson also worked as journalists.

== Julius Schwartz cameos ==
Artist Sid Greene was fond of drawing DC Comics editor Julius Schwartz into his stories whenever he could. The following is a list of the Star Rovers tales in which Schwartz is identifiable:

- "Who Caught the Loborilla?" (Mystery in Space #66) - page 2, panel 5, p7, panel 5 (observer)
- "What Happened on Sirius-4?" (Mystery in Space #69) - page 2, panels 3/4 (radio astronomer)
- "Where is the Paradise of Space?" (Mystery in Space #74) - page 2, panel 2 (in restaurant)
- "Where Was I Born - Venus? Mars? Jupiter?" (Mystery in Space ) - pages 4/5 (man in green hat)
- "Who went where -- and why?" (Mystery in Space) - page 2, panel 3 (in restaurant)
- "When Did Earth Vanish?" (Mystery in Space #86) - page 7, panel 1 (in crowd)
- "Will the Star Rovers Abandon Earth?" (Strange Adventures #159) - page 8, panel 5 ("specialist")
