= George Kashdan =

American comic book writer and editor

- Born: May 17, 1928 The Bronx, New York City, New York
- Died: June 3, 2006 (aged 78)
- Areas: Writer, Editor
- Notable works: Aquaman; The Mighty Hercules; The Superman/Aquaman Hour of Adventure; Tommy Tomorrow

George Kashdan (May 17, 1928 – June 3, 2006) was an American comic book writer and editor, primarily for DC Comics, who co-created such characters as Tommy Tomorrow, Mysto the Magician Detective, and others. He was a screenwriter for such animated television series as The Mighty Hercules and The Superman/Aquaman Hour of Adventure.

== Biography ==
=== Early life ===
Kashdan was born in The Bronx, New York City, New York, and received a Bachelor of Arts degree from the University of Chicago.

=== Comics ===
In 1947, after having written two comic book scripts for DC Comics, he was hired as an editor at that publishing company, where his brother, Bernard Kashdan, was a business executive who had joined the company in 1940. George Kashdan's first two recorded comic-book credits, appearing the same month, are writing the "Congo Bill" backup feature in Action Comics #105 (Feb. 1947), and co–creating the Tommy Tomorrow character with co–writers Bernie Breslauer and Jack Schiff and artist Howard Sherman in DC's Real Fact Comics #6 (Feb. 1947).

He became a story editor on Action Comics beginning with #106 (March 1947), mostly editing and rewriting the backup features on that anthology title, which headlined Superman, helmed by fellow story editor Mort Weisinger. As Kashdan recalled his start at the company, "There was a small emergency there. One of the editors with whom I had worked was Bernie Breslauer. ... He was in the hospital briefly and Mort called me. He said, 'Hey, we need an editor here.' Bernie came back and I remained, basically as a copy editor. I wasn't buying stories or giving out plots, or giving out assignments of any sort. Bernie died a year or two later, I guess — around 1950. I moved into his desk.

In 1962, Kashdan and artist Nick Cardy launched the Aquaman ongoing series for DC. Later in the 1960s, he devised the concept of Metamorpho, an idea fleshed out by writer Bob Haney and artist Ramona Fradon. Kashdan primarily wrote for DC's mystery and war comics series including G.I. Combat, House of Mystery, House of Secrets, The Unexpected, Weird War Tales, and The Witching Hour. A "Johnny Peril" story written by Kashdan for The Unexpected series in 1969 was put into inventory and finally published ten years later in the APA-I fanzine. A rare example of Kashdan working for another comic book publisher is the seven–page story "Who Toys with Terror" in Atlas/Seaboard Comics' Weird Tales of the Macabre #2 (March 1975). His final comics work was "Strange Rescue", a single-page story drawn by Dick Ayers and published in Sgt. Rock #421 (April 1988).

=== Animation ===
From 1963 to 1966, Kashdan was one of the writers of The Mighty Hercules series for Adventure Cartoon Productions. He worked on Filmation Associates' The Superman/Aquaman Hour of Adventure in 1967–1968.

== Bibliography ==
=== Atlas/Seaboard Comics ===
- Weird Tales of the Macabre #2 (1975)

=== DC Comics ===
- Action Comics #105–106, 113, 116, 131, 135, 145 (1947–1950)
- Adventure Comics #114, 120–122, 124, 137, 150, 154, 160, 162, 164, 168–170, 172–175, 224, 487–488 (1947–1981)
- Bomba, the Jungle Boy #1–5 (1967–1968)
- DC Special Series #4, 7 (1977)
- Detective Comics #125, 130, 132, 203, 205, 211, 295 (1947–1961)
- Forbidden Tales of Dark Mansion #12 (1973)
- Ghosts #17, 36, 59–63, 68, 75, 78, 81, 84–92, 94–101, 109 (1973–1982)
- G.I. Combat #207, 211, 218–219, 221, 223–224, 227, 229–230, 232, 234–235, 237, 240, 243–245, 247, 250–253, 256–262, 266, 268, 270–272, 275–278, 285, 287–288 (1978–1987)
- House of Mystery #215, 224–225, 244, 251, 277, 280, 282–283, 289–290, 296–298, 311, 313, 318, 320 (1973–1983)
- House of Secrets #108, 115, 119, 124, 128, 137–139, 142, 148 (1973–1977)
- Mystery in Space #112–113 (1980)
- Plop! #2–3, 5 (1973–1974)
- Rip Hunter...Time Master #24–29 (1965)
- Secrets of Haunted House #2, 4, 7, 18–19, 21–24, 26, 30–31, 33, 37, 42–43 (1975–1981)
- Secrets of Sinister House #16–18 (1974)
- Sgt. Rock #411–417, 421 (1986–1988)
- Tales of the Unexpected #72 (1962)
- Time Warp #1–5 (1979–1980)
- Tomahawk #118, 122, 128, 130 (1968–1970)
- The Unexpected #107–114, 117–122, 124–128, 130–140, 143, 145–151, 153–154, 157–164, 166–179, 181–200, 205, 207, 209–210, 212–214, 218–219 (1968–1982)
- Weird Mystery Tales #6, 13–14 (1973–1974)
- Weird War Tales #13, 23, 25, 28, 32–36, 38–40, 43, 45–49, 55, 62, 81–84, 89–90, 92–96, 98–99, 101–102, 104–106, 109, 112 (1973–1982)
- The Witching Hour #15, 17–20, 23, 28, 32–37, 39–40, 42–47, 49–53, 55–61, 63–70, 72–79, 81–85 (1971–1978)
- World's Finest Comics #26–28, 31, 33–38, 40–45, 49, 79, 127 (1947–1962)
- Young Love #123 (1977)
- Young Romance #171, 194 (1971–1973)

Preceded by Jack Schiff	Aquaman editor 1962–1968	Succeeded by Dick Giordano
Preceded by Murray Boltinoff	Blackhawk editor 1964–1968	Succeeded by Dick Giordano
Preceded by Murray Boltinoff	The Brave and the Bold editor 1964–1968	Succeeded by Murray Boltinoff
Preceded by Jack Miller	Rip Hunter...Time Master writer 1965	Succeeded by n/a
Preceded by n/a	Teen Titans editor 1966–1968	Succeeded by Dick Giordano
