= Nick Cardy =

American comic book artist

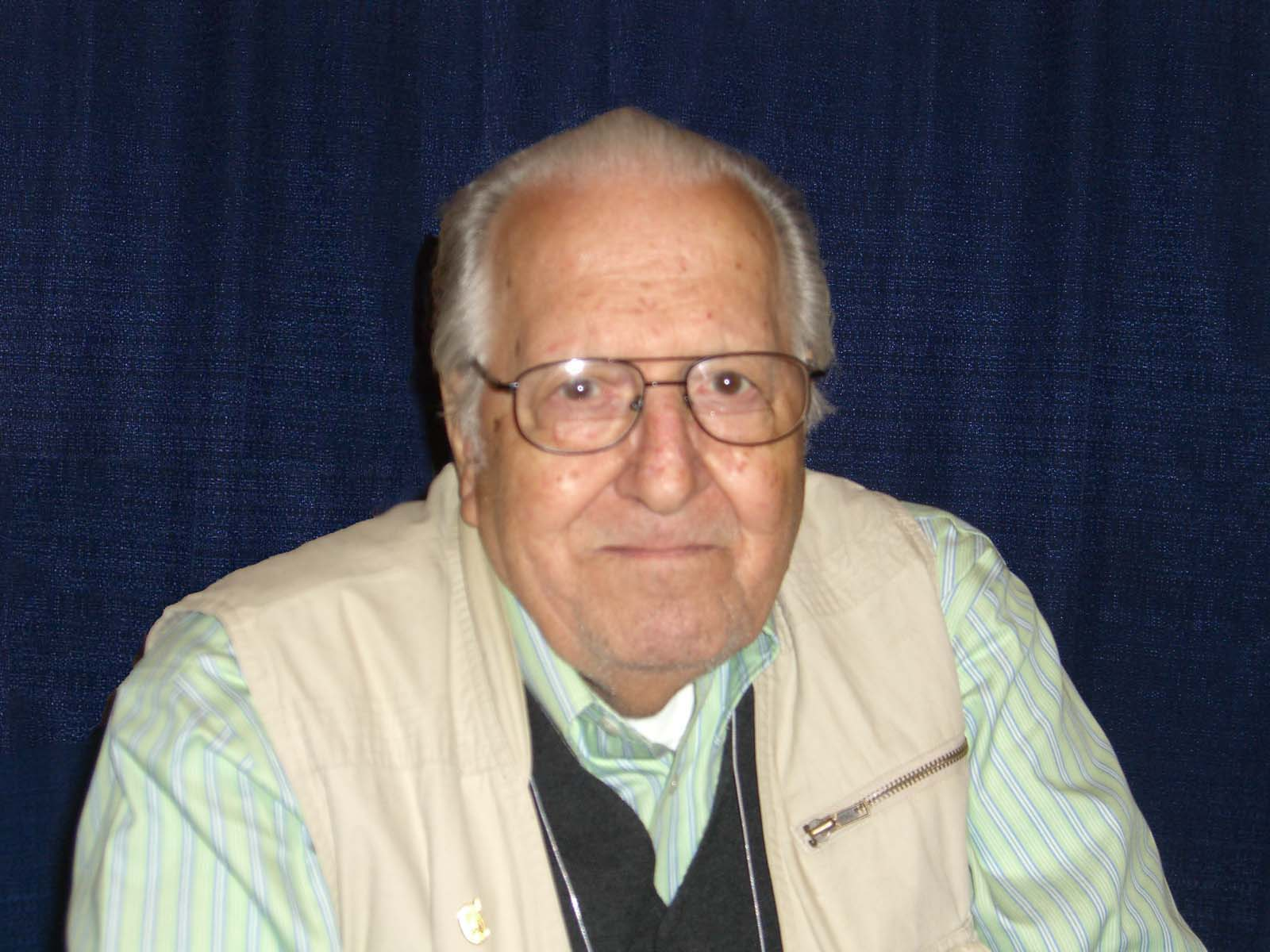
- Nick Cardy at the 2008 New York Comic Con.
- Born: Nicholas Viscardi; October 20, 1920 New York City, New York, U.S.
- Died: November 3, 2013 (aged 93) Florida, U.S.
- Areas: Penciller, Inker
- Pseudonym: Nick Cardi
- Notable works: Aquaman; Bat Lash; Teen Titans
- Awards: Inkpot Award, 1998; Will Eisner Comic Book Hall of Fame, 2005

Nicholas Viscardi (October 20, 1920 – November 3, 2013), known professionally as Nick Cardy and Nick Cardi, was an American comics artist best known for his DC Comics work on Aquaman, the Teen Titans and other major characters. Cardy was inducted into the Will Eisner Comic Book Hall of Fame in 2005.

== Early life ==
Nick Cardy was born Nicholas Viscardi on October 20, 1920, in New York City. He began drawing when he was very young, telling one interviewer that some paintings he had done for his school were "published in the [New York] Herald-Tribune or one of those early papers. The teachers wanted one on sports. It was a 4 × 8 panel. ... So that was published and quite a bit of the stuff was published. ... " He also provided artwork for the Boys Club of America, and attended the Art Students League of New York, studying life drawing.

== Career ==
=== Early career ===
As did many early comics professionals, Cardy entered the comics field working for Eisner & Iger, a company founded by Will Eisner and Jerry Iger, that was one of a handful of comic book "packagers" creating comics on demand for publishers testing the waters of the emerging medium. Joining the studio circa 1940, he worked on Fight Comics, Jungle Comics, Kaanga Comics, and Wings for Fiction House Publications. He wrote and drew the four-page backup feature "Lady Luck" in Will Eisner's 16-page, newspaper Sunday-supplement comic book colloquially called "The Spirit Section", from the May 18, 1941 strip through February 22, 1942. Though his Lady Luck stories were credited under the house pseudonym Ford Davis, Viscardi would subtly work in the initials "NV" somewhere into each tale. He used both his birth name and the pen name "Nick Cardy" concurrently for a time, he eventually adopted Nick Cardy for his comic-book work.

Cardy recalled of his start at Eisner & Iger that he worked alongside

... Lou Fine, George Tuska, [and] Charlie Sultan. Bob Powell came in later when I was doing "Lady Luck" [after Eisner had split from Iger to concentrate on 'The Spirit Section']. He was sitting behind me. He would help a kid around the block – tell a newcomer to take it easy and that sort of thing. When I worked on 'Lady Luck', Will Eisner had rented an apartment at [the Manhattan complex] Tudor City. ... He had one room where he worked, and the other room took up all the rest of the paraphernalia. I sat next to Will's door, Bob Powell sat next to me; Tex Blaisdell used to come in, and Chuck Cuidera (who was doing Blackhawk) was there. ... It was a learning experience. Watching Lou Fine work – his work was like a fine painting; it took a long time to do it but it was a brilliant piece of work. In my opinion, for drawing, you couldn't beat Lou Fine; he was terrific. I think Will Eisner had a coarser line but his work was more dramatic and he told a better story.

=== Military and return to civilian life ===
Cardy did World War II military service from 1943 to 1945, earning two Purple Hearts for wounds suffered as a tank driver in the armored cavalry. He began his Army career with the 66th Infantry Division, during which time he won a competition to design its patch, creating its snarling black panther logo. His art talent led to his being assigned an office job at division headquarters. This lasted, Cardy recalled in an interview, because a general who had seen Cardy's cartoons in an Officers Club had Cardy assigned to his own corps. As the artist tells it, the only opening was for a corporal in the motor pool, so Cardy was promoted and assigned to that duty. This, he said, led in turn, upon his being shipped to the European theater, to Cardy's assignment as an assistant tank driver for the Third Armored Division, under General Courtney Hodges. Later, between the end of the war and his discharge, Cardy said he worked for the Army's Information and Education office in France. Cardy documented his time in the military in a series of intricate sketches and watercolors.

Back in civilian life, Cardy begin doing advertising art as well as covers for crossword puzzle magazines and other periodicals. In 1950, he began drawing the black-and-white daily Tarzan comic strip of writer-artist Burne Hogarth. From 1952 to 1953, Cardy assisted Warren Tufts on Tufts' comic strip Casey Ruggles.

=== DC Comics ===
Teen Titans #23 (Oct. 1969), Art by Cardy.

In 1950, Cardy began his decades-long association with DC Comics, starting with the comic book Gang Busters, based on the dramatic radio show. He began developing his breakout reputation with Tomahawk, his most prominent series at the time, which starred a white American colonist fighting the British undercover as an Iroquois Indian during the American Revolutionary War.

From 1962 to 1968, he drew the first 39 issues of Aquaman, whose character had previously starred in a backup feature in Adventure Comics, and all its covers through the final issue (#56, April 1971). He recalled that, "Ramona Fradon had been drawing the character but was moving on for some reason. I remember being in [editor] Murray's [Boltinoff] office with Ramona during the transition. ... Anyway, they must have liked my work because when the character got his own series, they made me the artist". Among the Aquaman stories which Cardy drew were issue #18 which featured the wedding of Aquaman and Mera and #23 which saw the birth of the couple's son. Aquagirl was introduced in issue #33 (June 1967) by Cardy and writer Bob Haney, while Black Manta was created for issue #35 (September 1967).

Cardy first drew the Teen Titans on the cover of The Brave and the Bold #60 (July 1965), where the superhero sidekicks Robin, Kid Flash, and Aqualad were joined by Wonder Woman's younger sister Wonder Girl in her first appearance. After next being featured in Showcase #59 (Dec. 1965) - Cardy's first issue drawing the group's interior pages - the team was spun off into their own series with Teen Titans #1 (Feb. 1966). From 1966 to 1973, Cardy penciled or inked – sometimes both – all 43 issues of the series. Neal Adams was called upon to rewrite and redraw a Cardy-drawn Teen Titans story which had been written by Len Wein and Marv Wolfman. The story, titled "Titans Fit the Battle of Jericho!", would have introduced DC's first African American superhero but was rejected by publisher Carmine Infantino. The revised story appeared in Teen Titans #20 (March–April 1969). New members of the team, psychic Lilith Clay and Mal Duncan, were created by Cardy and writer Robert Kanigher. In 1968–69, Cardy drew the fondly remembered but short-lived Western series Bat Lash, about an expert gunslinger who was nonetheless a dandy, and who, in a nod to the 1960s counterculture, wore a flower in his hat. Cardy during this time also assisted artist Al Plastino, a childhood friend, on the Batman comic strip.

Cardy became the primary DC cover artist from the early to mid-1970s.

A popular but apocryphal anecdote, told by DC editor Julius Schwartz, concerned Cardy being fired by Carmine Infantino for not following a cover layout, only to be rehired moments later when Schwartz praised the errant cover art. Cardy said in 2005,

[A]t one of the conventions ... I said, 'You know, Carmine, Julie Schwartz wrote something in [his autobiography] that I don't remember at all and it doesn't sound like you at all'. And I told him the incident ... and he said, 'That's crazy. You know I always loved your work. Gee, you were one of the best artists in the business. The guy's crazy'. So I said, 'Okay, come on'. We went over to Julie Schwartz's table and we told him what our problem was. And Carmine and I said, 'We don't remember the incident'. So Julie said, 'Well, it's a good story, anyway'. [laughs] And that was it. He let it go at that. [laughs] He just made it up.

=== Later career ===
Cardy left the comics industry in the mid-1970s for the more lucrative field of commercial art. There, under the name Nick Cardi, he did magazine art and ad illustrations, including movie advertising art (though not necessarily the "one-sheet" posters) for films including The Street Fighter (1974), The Night They Robbed Big Bertha's (1975), Neil Simon's California Suite (1978), Stanley Donen's Movie Movie (1978), Martin Ritt's Casey's Shadow (1978), and Francis Ford Coppola's Apocalypse Now (1979).

In 1996, Cardy was one of the many creators who contributed to the Superman: The Wedding Album one-shot wherein the title character married Lois Lane. Other late-career comics work included a one-page illustration for Wonder Woman vol. 2 #120 (April 1997), the cover of Silver Age: Teen Titans #1 (July 2000), two pages for Titans #25 (March 2001), and the cover of Teen Titans Lost Annual #1 (March 2008).

== Personal life ==
Following his World War II discharge from the U.S. Army, Cardy met and married Ruth Houghtby. In 1955 they had a son, Peter, who died in 2001. The couple remained married through 1969. Cardy died of congestive heart failure in Florida on November 3, 2013.

== Awards ==
Nick Cardy received an Inkpot Award in 1998. On July 15, 2005, Cardy was one of four professionals inducted that year into the comics industry's Will Eisner Comic Book Hall of Fame.

Viscardi earned two Purple Hearts for wounds suffered as a tank driver while serving with the 3rd Armored Division in WWII. He designed the patch for the 66th Infantry Division after winning a competition.

== Bibliography ==
=== Interior work ===
==== DC Comics ====
- Action Comics #229–232 (Congo Bill) (1957)
- The Adventures of Alan Ladd #1, 4–7 (1949–1950)
- Aquaman #1–39 (1962–1968)
- Bat Lash #1–7 (1968–1969)
- Batman #80 (1953)
- The Brave and the Bold #91–92, 94–96 (full art); #97, 99 (inks over Bob Brown) (1970–1971)
- Challengers of the Unknown #71 (1969)
- Congo Bill #1–7 (1954–1955)
- Detective Comics #293–296, 298–300 (Aquaman); #430 (inks over Bob Brown) (Batman) (1961–1972)
- Falling in Love #79, 95 (1965–1967)
- Gang Busters #6–8, 10, 13–16, 20–21, 23, 38, 41, 56, 61–62, 65, 67 (1948–1958)
- Ghosts #4 (inks over George Tuska) (1972)
- Girls' Love Stories #130 (1967)
- House of Mystery #19–22, 28, 57, 60, 63–64, 71–72, 76, 78–80, 84, 87, 92–94, 96–97, 107–108, 111, 128–129, 198 (1953–1972)
- House of Secrets #2, 6, 10–11, 14, 16, 19, 24, 26, 29, 40, 113 (1957–1973)
- Legends of Daniel Boone #1–8 (1955–1956)
- Mr. District Attorney #5, 14 (1948–1950)
- My Greatest Adventure #3, 12–13, 15, 17, 22, 24, 26, 29–31, 34–35, 39, 43–49, 51 (1955–1961)
- Phantom Stranger vol. 2 #5 (inks over Curt Swan) (1970)
- Plop! #2 (1973)
- Rip Hunter ... Time Master #4–5 (1961)
- Secret Hearts #145 (inks over John Celardo) (1970)
- Showcase #31–33 (Aquaman); #59 (Teen Titans); #76 (Bat Lash) (1961–1968)
- Strange Adventures #167 (1964)
- Superman: The Wedding Album (among other artists) (1996)
- Tales of the Unexpected #7, 11–13, 18–20, 26–27, 30, 33, 38–39, 41, 43, 45, 47, 52–55, 58 (1956–1961)
- Teen Titans #1–8, 11, 13–14, 16–17, 25–26, 28–30, 32, 36 (full art); #9–10, 12 (inks over Irv Novick); #15 (inks over Lee Elias); #20–22 (inks over Neal Adams); #22–24 (inks over Gil Kane); #27 (inks over Carmine Infantino); #27, 31, 33–39 (inks over George Tuska); #40–43 (inks over Art Saaf) (1966–1973)
- Titans #25 (among other artists) (2001)
- Tomahawk #138 (1972)
- The Unexpected #165 (inks over Dick Dillin) (1975)
- The Witching Hour #8 (1970)
- Wonder Woman vol. 2 #120 (one page only) (1997)
- World's Finest Comics #68–72, 87 (Tomahawk); 125–126 (Aquaman) (1954–1962)
- Young Romance #173 (1971)

==== Eclipse Comics ====
- True Love #1–2 (1986)

==== NL Communications, Inc. ====
- National Lampoon #54 (1974)

==== Quality Comics ====
- Crack Comics #7–8 (1940)
- Feature Comics #32, 40–42 (1940–1941)
- Hit Comics #5–11 (1940–1941)
- National Comics #6–12, 14–20 (1940–1942)

==== Standard Comics ====
- Adventures in the Unknown #7 (1952)
- Adventures into Darkness #5, 11 (1953)
- Intimate Love #20 (1952)
- Lost World #5 (1952)
- New Romances #13 (1952)

=== Cover work ===
==== DC Comics ====
Aquaman #39 (June 1968). Cover art by Cardy.

- Action Comics #409–418, 420–445 (1972–1975)
- Aquaman #1–56 (1962–1971)
- Bat Lash #1–7 (1968–1969)
- Bat Lash: Guns & Roses trade paperback (2009)
- Batman #208, 247, 252, 254–261 (1969–1975)
- The Brave and the Bold #60, 91–92, 94, 96–98, 100–104, 110 (1965–1973)
- Challengers of the Unknown #71, 73, 80 (1969–1973)
- Congo Bill #1–7 (1954–1955)
- Dark Mansion of Forbidden Love #4 (1972)
- DC Special #3, 10 (1969–1971)
- DC 100 Page Super Spectacular #DC–4, DC–11, DC–12, DC–14, DC–15, DC–17, DC–18, DC–19, DC–20, DC–21, DC–22 (1971–1973)
- Detective Comics #429, 436 (1972–1973)
- Falling in Love #79, 112–113, 117, 119–120, 137 (1965–1972)
- The Flash #214, 216–219, 221, 222–232 (1972–1975)
- Forbidden Tales of Dark Mansion #5, 10, 12, 14–15 (1972–1974)
- From Beyond the Unknown #20–21, 23–25 (1972–1973)
- Gang Busters #15–16, 18 (1950–1951)
- Ghosts #1–6, 8–36 (1971–1975)
- Girls' Love Stories #139, 143, 145, 148, 151, 166 (1968–1971)
- Girls' Romances #120, 144, 147–148, 153–154 (1966–1971)
- Heart Throbs #121–122, 138 (1969–1972)
- House of Mystery #93, 171, 174, 198, 208, 220 (1959–1973)
- House of Secrets #6, 95, 104, 109, 111, 113–114 (1957–1973)
- Justice League of America #99–104, 106–116 (1972–1975)
- The Legend of Daniel Boone #1–8 (1955–1956)
- Legion of Super-Heroes #1–2 (1973)
- Limited Collectors' Edition #C–23, C–32, C–34 (1973–1975)
- My Greatest Adventure #24, 26 (1958)
- Phantom Stranger #27–28 (1973–1974)
- Rip Hunter ... Time Master #4–6 (1961–1962)
- Secrets of Sinister House #5, 8, 10, 13, 16–18 (1972–1974)
- Secret Origins #1–7 (1973–74)
- Secret Six #2 (1968)
- Shazam! #1 (1973)
- Showcase #32, 59, 76 (1961–1968)
- Silver Age: Teen Titans #1 (2000)
- Spectre #8–10 (1969)
- Spirit #31 (2009)
- Strange Adventures #239, 241, 243 (1972–1973)
- Strange Sports Stories #1–6 (1973–1974)
- Super DC Giant #S–17 (1970)
- Superboy #182–198, 200–206 (1972–1975)
- Superman #253–262, 264–285 (1972–1975)
- The Superman Family #164–169 (1974–1975)
- Superman's Pal, Jimmy Olsen #154–163 (1972–1974)
- Tales of the Unexpected #20 (1957)
- Teen Titans #1–43 (1966–1973)
- Teen Titans Annual #1 (1999)
- Teen Titans Lost Annual #1 (2008)
- Tomahawk #20–21, 24–27, 31–32, 36–37, 120 (1953–1969)
- The Unexpected #111, 116–117, 119–120, 123, 125–139, 141–162 (1969–1975)
- Wanted, the Most Dangerous Villains #2, 4–9 (1972–1973)
- Weird Mystery Tales #3, 7 (1972–1973)
- Weird War Tales #9–11 (1972–1973)
- Weird Western Tales #16 (1972)
- Weird Worlds #9 (1974)
- The Witching Hour #1–6, 11–12, 15–16, 18–52, 60 (1969–1975)
- Wonder Woman #205–206, 211, 216 (1973–1975)
- World's Finest Comics #212–228 (1972–1975)
- Young Love #74, 107 (1969–1974)
- Young Romance #157, 163, 187 (1968–1972)

==== Marvel Comics ====
- Crazy Magazine #7–8, 10, 12–13, 15–16 (1974–1976)
- Deadly Hands of Kung Fu #15, 18 (1975)
- Marvel Movie Premiere #1 (The Land That Time Forgot adaptation) (1975)
- Marvel Premiere #28 (Legion of Monsters) (1976)

Preceded by n/a	Aquaman artist 1962–1968	Succeeded by Jim Aparo
Preceded by n/a	Teen Titans artist 1966–1973	Succeeded by Pablo Marcos (in 1976)
Preceded by Ross Andru	The Brave and the Bold artist 1970–1971	Succeeded by Jim Aparo
