= Space Ranger =

Fictional comic book character

- Cover of Showcase #15 (July 1958), art by Bob Brown.

Publication information
- Publisher: DC Comics
- First appearance: Showcase #15 (July 1958)
- Created by: Edmond Hamilton (writer); Gardner Fox (writer); Bob Brown (artist)

In-story information
- Alter ego: Rick Starr
- Species: Human
- Place of origin: Earth
- Team affiliations: Justice League
- Abilities: Expert pilot, marksman, scientist and detective armed with vast variety of futuristic weapons and gadgets. Sidekick is an extraterrestrial shapeshifter.

Space Ranger (Rick Starr) is a science fiction hero who was published by American company DC Comics in several of their 1950s and 1960s anthology titles. He first appeared in Showcase #15 (July 1958) and was created by writers Edmond Hamilton and Gardner Fox and artist Bob Brown. The character has notable similarities to a preceding character named David "Lucky" Starr, created by novelist Isaac Asimov in his 1952 novel David Starr, Space Ranger. After appearing in Showcase #15 and 16, the Space Ranger was given a cover-starring series in Tales of the Unexpected, starting with issue #40 and lasting until #82 (1959–64). Afterward, he moved to Mystery in Space.

== Publication history ==
In 1957, DC Comics editorial director Irwin Donenfeld held a meeting with editors Jack Schiff and Julius Schwartz in his office, asking them each to create a new science fiction hero: one from the present, and one from the future. Given first choice, Schiff chose to create one from the future.

After a successful tryout in Showcase #15 and 16, the Space Ranger was given a slot in Tales of the Unexpected as of issue #40 (August 1959). He moved to Mystery in Space for issues #92–99, 101, 103 (1964–65).

== Fictional character biography ==
Set in the 22nd century, Space Ranger is really Rick Starr, a seemingly shiftless executive at his gruff, cigar-chomping father Thaddeus's Allied Solar Enterprises. He takes on the role of the superheroic interplanetary troubleshooter to battle space pirates, alien invaders, evil scientists and other futuristic threats both cosmic and criminal, hiding his true identity beneath a transparent blue helmet and operating out of a hidden asteroid base via his spaceship, the Solar King.

Possessing no powers other than his highly developed brain and brawn, the crew cut, yellow and red spacesuit-clad "Guardian of the Solar System" (later "Guardian of the Universe") armed himself with various super-scientific gadgets, namely a multi-purpose pistol.

Space Ranger is assisted by the only two people who knew his secret, his loyal and highly efficient beautiful blonde secretary/girlfriend Myra Mason and Cryll, a pink shapeshifting alien who he discovered in suspended animation beyond the orbit of Pluto.

Space Ranger and Cryll have visited the 20th century on occasion, working with contemporary heroes such as Green Lantern Hal Jordan and the Justice League, and in their own time have had adventures with a red-headed 22nd century descendant of Adam Strange.

=== Starman ===
Space Ranger makes an appearance in Starman #55 (July 1999), in which Space Ranger, Ultra the Multi-Alien, and Space Cabbie attempt to find Starman's cosmic staff for the Space Museum. Each regales the other with different interpretations of Jack and Mikaal Tomas rescuing Starfire from a space pirate.

=== Trinity ===
Space Ranger made regular appearances in Trinity, a weekly series published from 2008 to 2009. In an alternate reality created by the absence of Superman, Batman, and Wonder Woman, Space Ranger is a member of the League, a group of vigilantes hunted by Earth's registered superhumans. When the League goes public during a crisis, Space Ranger reveals himself to be a disguised Martian Manhunter.

== Other versions ==
In the "Without You I'm Nothing" short story written by Evan Dorkin and drawn by Steven Weissman, Cryll is one of a number of ex-sidekicks living on Skid Row.

Starr also appears in DC's 2013 Threshold comic by Keith Giffen.

== In other media ==
Space Ranger makes a non-speaking cameo appearance in the Batman: The Brave and the Bold episode "The Siege of Starro!".
