= Bob Brown (illustrator) =

American comic book artist

- Born: William Robert Brown; August 22, 1915
- Died: January 1977 (aged 61)
- Area: Penciller
- Notable works: The Avengers, Challengers of the Unknown; Daredevil, Detective Comics, Space Ranger, Superboy, Tomahawk

William Robert Brown (August 22, 1915 – January 1977) was an American comics artist with an extensive career from the early 1940s through the 1970s. With writers Edmond Hamilton and Gardner Fox, Brown co-created the DC Comics hero Space Ranger, drawing the character's complete run from his debut in the try-out comic Showcase #15 (Aug. 1958) through Mystery in Space #103 (July 1965).

Brown also penciled the DC title Challengers of the Unknown, taking over from Jack Kirby, from 1959 to 1968.

== Early life ==
Brown was born in Syracuse, New York, to a father who managed a vaudeville theater and a mother who worked as a pianist. He attended the Hartford Art School and the Rhode Island School of Design. Following his parents into show business, he performed as a youth in a song-and-dance act with his sister and younger brother, starting around 1927. They worked together into the early 1930s. After graduating from high school, Brown and his sister worked in night clubs and theaters as a duo. By the latter 1930s, Brown was a solo dancer while his sister worked with the Tommy Dorsey Band.

In 1940, he enlisted and served in the Army Air Corps as an aircraft radio operator at Scott Field, Illinois. Later, Brown became an aviation cadet at Kelly Field in San Antonio, Texas. After crashing a plane in pilot training, Brown, a commissioned officer, trained in Hondo, Texas, as a bombardier and a navigator, and taught navigation to flight cadets before serving on a B-29 bomber in the Pacific theater of World War II. He flew 35 missions over Japan in the 877th Squadron of General Curtis LeMay's 20th Bomber Command. Brown earned six Air Medals and a Distinguished Flying Cross.

== Career ==
Brown began his career in comics during the 1940s, with his earliest known credit as both writer and artist of the "Criss Cross" backup feature in Fox Comics' teen-humor title Meet Corliss Archer. After some early work on titles from Marvel Comics precursor Timely Comics as it was transitioning into the 1950s iteration, Atlas Comics, he became regular artist of the feature "Vigilante" in DC Comics' Action Comics, drawing it in issues #152–185 (cover-dated Jan. 1951 – Oct. 1953).

In addition to his work on DC Comics' "Vigilante" feature during this time, Brown drew sporadic stories for Atlas Comics and St. John Publications, as well as for such DC supernatural titles as House of Mystery and The Phantom Stranger. He began working exclusively for Atlas sometime in 1954, with the supernatural story "The Time Is Now" in Mystery Tales #25 (Jan. 1955), signed W. R. Brown, the first of many he would draw in genres including Westerns and jungle adventures. With an unknown writer, tentatively identified as Atlas editor-in-chief Stan Lee, Brown produced the first version of the Rawhide Kid (related in name only to the more long-running character Lee and artist Jack Kirby created in 1960) in Rawhide Kid #1 (March 1955). Because another artist, Joe Maneely, drew the cover, often done before a comic's interior art, it is unclear whether Brown or Maneely created the character design. Brown continued on the title through issue #7 (March 1956), then freelanced for both Atlas and DC before becoming regular artist on the latter's American Revolutionary War series Tomahawk with issues #39 (March 1956). He would continue on that title, also doing other work for DC, through #52 (Dec. 1959).

With plotter Gardner Fox and scripter Edmond Hamilton, Brown co-created the feature "Space Ranger" in Showcase #15 (Aug. 1958). He would continue drawing that science fiction adventure after it became a feature in Tales of the Unexpected and Mystery in Space, through issue #103 (July 1965) of the latter. He took over Challengers of the Unknown from that adventuring team's co-creator, artist Jack Kirby, beginning with issue #9 (Sept. 1959). He would continue on it through #63 (Sept. 1968), with the comic becoming his best-known, signature work. He and writer Arnold Drake created the Beast Boy character in Doom Patrol #99 (Nov. 1965). Brown drew stories as well for DC's The Brave and the Bold, House of Secrets, Superboy, and World's Finest Comics. With writer Dennis O'Neil, he crafted Batman's first encounter with the League of Assassins in Detective Comics #405 (Nov. 1970) and co-created the character Talia in Detective Comics #411 (May 1971) as a recurring romantic interest for Batman.

Brown first drew for the modern Marvel Comics as co-penciler of the feature "The Beast" in Amazing Adventures vol. 2, #16 (Jan. 1973). After a little more work for DC, he penciled issues #6–8 (June–Oct. 1973) of the short-lived superhero title Warlock, and became regular penciler of the long-running superhero-team series The Avengers, penciling most issues between #113–126 (July 1973 – Aug. 1974). He and Sal Buscema drew the "Avengers-Defenders Clash" storyline in 1973. Brown's last few years were devoted to a run on Marvel Comics' Daredevil from 1974 to 1977. New adversaries for the title character introduced during his tenure include the Silver Samurai in issue #111 (July 1974) and Bullseye in #131 (March 1976). One of his series collaborators, writer Tony Isabella, said Brown "was very much underappreciated" by comic-book fans, In addition, comics historian Mark Evanier recounted that by this point, Brown

...found his work regarded as "old-fashioned". It wasn't so much that Brown couldn't take a more modern approach to his work as that he just plain didn't understand what that meant. Editors kept showing him the work of new artists, he told me. They'd say, "This is what we want now," but Brown couldn't grasp just what it was he was supposed to learn from the examples, which often struck him as displaying weak anatomy, poor perspective and other fundamental errors. It was almost like they were telling him that, "Kids relate to crude artwork," and he knew it wasn't that.

One of Brown's last published pieces, a fill-in story written by Bill Mantlo and drawn a couple of years earlier, was published posthumously in Uncanny X-Men #106 (Aug. 1977).

== Personal life ==
Brown married a student nurse, Dot, from the St. Louis area when he was posted at Scott Field. Sometime after returning from World War II in September 1945, Brown and Dot married and had three daughters, Marilyn Kay, Constance and Virginia Lou.

Brown was living in Manhattan at the time of his death in 1977 at age 61 from leukemia. He had just signed on as the new artist on Wonder Woman with #231 (May 1977) but completed only a single issue, released two weeks after his death. He was eulogized in the August 1977 cover dated issues of Marvel's titles, with special mention given to his fostering ". . . better communication between American and European cartoonists."

== Bibliography ==
Brown's comics work (interior pencil art) includes:

=== DC Comics ===
- Action Comics (Vigilante) #152–157, 159–185 (1951–53)
- All-American Men of War #39, 41 (1956–1957)
- Batman #248–249 (1973)
- Batman Family (Batgirl) #10 (1977)
- Boy Commandos #34 (1949)
- The Brave and the Bold #78, 97, 99, 103 (1968–1972)
- Challengers of the Unknown #9–63 (1959–1968)
- Detective Comics #378–394, 396, 398–399, 401, 403, 405–406, 409, 411–413, 415, 417, 422–424, 428, 430, 432, 436 (1968–1973)
- Doom Patrol #94, 98–99 (1965)
- Frontier Fighters #8 (1956)
- Gang Busters #25, 36, 55, 62, 67 (1951–1958)
- Ghosts #2, 9, 11, 13, 27, 40 (1971–1975)
- House of Mystery #1, 3, 6, 10–11, 14, 67, 69, 74, 88, 95 (1951–1960)
- House of Secrets #16, 26 (1959)
- My Greatest Adventure #28, 30, 32–33, 41 (1959–1960)
- Our Army at War #42 (1956)
- Showcase (Space Ranger) #15–16 (1958)
- Star Spangled War Stories #131 (1952)
- Star Spangled War Stories vol. 2 #3, 7, 15, 39–40, 50 (1952–1956)
- Superboy #150–155, 157–164, 166–173, 175–184, 186–197 (1968–1973)
- Superman (World of Krypton) #243, 260 (1971–1973)
- The Superman Family (Supergirl) #183 (1977)
- Tales of the Unexpected #19, 21, 30–32, 47–48, 50–77, 98 (1957–1966)
- Teen Titans #41, 47 (1972–1977)
- Tomahawk #39–57, 60–62, 98, 101, 103, 105–106, 110–111, 113, 120 (1956–1969)
- The Unexpected #105, 128, 131, 158, 159 (1968–1974)
- The Witching Hour #9, 18, 22, 38 (1970–1974)
- Wonder Woman #231 (1977)
- World's Finest Comics #52–58, 83–84, 86, 91, 96, 100–101 (1951–1959)

=== Marvel Comics ===
- Amazing Adventures (Beast) #16 (1973)
- Apache Kid #6, 12 (1951–1955)
- Astonishing #54 (1956)
- The Avengers #113–120, 122–123, 126 (1973–1974)
- Daredevil #107–109, 111, 113–115, 117, 119–123, 125–135, 142–143 (1974–1977)
- Dracula Lives #10–11 (1975)
- Fantastic Four #154 (1975)
- Frankenstein #11 (1974)
- Frontier Western #4 (1956)
- Ghost Rider #15 (1975)
- Girl Comics #3 (1950)
- Journey into Mystery #26, 29 (1955)
- Journey into Unknown Worlds #42 (1956)
- Lorna the Jungle Girl #13 (1955)
- Love Romances #8 (1949)
- Lovers #28, 50, 72 (1950–1955)
- Man Comics #3 (1950)
- Marines in Action #1, 3 (1955)
- Marines in Battle #8, 13–14 (1956)
- Marvel Premiere (Torpedo) #39–40 (1977–1978)
- Marvel Preview #12 (1977)
- Marvel Tales #147 (1956)
- Marvel Two-in-One #10–11 (1975)
- My Own Romance #45 (1955)
- Mystery Tales #25, 37, 39 (1955–1956)
- Mystic #36, 44 (1955–1956)
- Power Man #38–39 (1976–1977)
- The Rampaging Hulk (Bloodstone) #2 (1977)
- Rawhide Kid #1–5 (1955)
- Spellbound #13 (1953)
- Strange Tales #16, 43, 49 (1953–1956)
- Strange Tales of the Unusual #1 (1955)
- Tales of Justice #58 (1956)
- True Secrets #37 (1956)
- Vampire Tales #6 (1974)
- War Comics #18, 39 (1953–1956)
- Warlock #6–8 (1973)
- Western Outlaws #12 (1955)
- X-Men #106 (1977)

| Preceded by Fred Ray | Tomahawk artist 1956–1969 | Succeeded by Frank Thorne |
| Preceded by Jack Kirby | Challengers of the Unknown artist 1959–1968 | Succeeded by Jack Sparling |
| Preceded by Frank Springer | Detective Comics artist 1968–1973 | Succeeded by Jim Aparo |
| Preceded by Al Plastino | Superboy artist 1968–1973 | Succeeded by Dave Cockrum |
| Preceded by Don Heck | The Avengers artist 1973–1974 | Succeeded by Sal Buscema |
| Preceded by Don Heck | Daredevil artist 1974–1977 | Succeeded by Lee Elias |
