= From Beyond the Unknown =

American comic

- From Beyond the Unknown #1 (Oct.-Nov. 1969), art by Joe Kubert.

Publication information
- Publisher: DC Comics
- Schedule: Bi-monthly
- Format: Ongoing series
- Publication date: October–November 1969 – November–December 1973
- No. of issues: 25

From Beyond the Unknown is the title of an American science fiction comic book series published by DC Comics from 1969 to 1973.

== Publication history ==
From Beyond the Unknown was published as a bi-monthly comics anthology series for 25 issues, from October–November 1969 to November–December 1973. There was an extra month's gap in mid–1973, between issues #22 and #23, and the series was cancelled at the end of that year.

From Beyond the Unknown was an anthology series, whose tagline promised to provide "Stories that Stagger the Imagination". The series reprinted stories from earlier DC Comics anthologies, including Strange Adventures and Mystery in Space. Covers featured such imaginative settings as an alien auctioneer preparing to sell the Earth, or an ape-man trying to conquer the world.

The title was revived in March 2020, as part of the DC 100-Page Giant comic Line.

== Creators ==
Writers

- Otto Binder
- John Broome
- Gardner Fox
- Sid Gerson
- Edmond Hamilton
- France Herron
- Sam Merwin, Jr.
- Joe Millard
- Jack Miller
- Ruben Moreira
- Denny O'Neil
- Manny Rubin
- Joe Samachson

Artists

- Neal Adams
- Murphy Anderson
- Sy Barry
- Nick Cardy
- Mort Drucker
- Frank Giacoia
- Joe Giella
- John Giunta
- Jerry Grandenetti
- Sid Greene
- Carmine Infantino
- Michael Kaluta
- Gil Kane
- Joe Kubert
- Jim Mooney
- Ruben Moreira
- Bob Oksner
- Bernard Sachs
- Mike Sekowsky
- Henry Sharp
- Howard Sherman
- Manny Stallman
- Alex Toth
- Wally Wood
