= Threshold (DC Comics) =

- Cover of Threshold #1 (March 2013), art by Howard Porter and Hi-Fi.

Publication information
- Publisher: DC Comics
- Schedule: Monthly
- Format: Ongoing series
- Genre: Science fiction, superhero
- Publication date: March – October 2013
- No. of issues: 8

Creative team
- Written by: Keith Giffen
- Artist(s): Tom Raney, Scott Kolins, Phil Winslade
- Letterer(s): Dezi Sienty, David Sharpe
- Colorist(s): Andrew Dalhouse, John Kalisz, Chris Sotomayor, Hi-Fi
- Editor(s): Kate Stewart, Joey Cavalieri, Matt Idelson, Kyle Andrukiewicz

Threshold was an ongoing comic book series published by DC Comics, as part of The New 52. Threshold was written by Keith Giffen and illustrated by Tom Raney. The series explored the space-oriented side and cosmic mythos of DC Universe.

== Publication history ==
Threshold was announced on October 12, 2012, as part of a "Fourth Wave" of comics for The New 52. The series spun out of Green Lantern: New Guardians Annual #1 (March 2013), and Blue Beetle #16 (March 2013), picking up on plot threads that were developed. Giffen planned to re-introduce "dozens" of space-related characters into The New 52, among them: Omega Men, Space Ranger, Lady Styx, Space Cabbie and Star Hawkins.

A Larfleeze back-up, drawn by Scott Kolins, ran from issues #1 to #5. Larfleeze would spin-off into a self-titled series after the conclusion of the back-up.

A Star Hawkins back-up feature began with issue #6, drawn by Timothy Green II and Joseph Silver.

Threshold was cancelled with issue #8.

== Plot ==
In the conclusion of Green Lantern: New Guardians Annual #1 (March 2013), Jediah Caul, previously a deep cover member of the Green Lantern Corps working for the Guardians of the Universe, is captured and forced into The Hunted, with his discharged power ring embedded into his chest. His Green Lantern power battery is collected by the host of The Hunted, Bleeding Adonis.

The Hunted is a bounty hunting glimmernet game show taking place on Tolerance, a planet in Lady Styx's sector of space, the Tenebrian Dominion. Those who are labeled as being a threat to the Tenebrian Dominion have a bounty put on their head and are inducted into the game.

The series begins with Caul evading capture from hunters and hunt clubs. He is aided by Ember who, with Star Hawkins, was supposed to bring him in to join their resistance forces. Ember is also part of The Hunted. Another Hunted competitor, Stealth, runs into another competitor, Rikane "Ric" Starr, a former member of the Space Rangers. Starr is revealed to be working with Colonel T'omas T'morra, head of the resistance, to create blind spots for Hunted competitions. The "Crimson Thrust" hunt club attempts to ambush Stealth and Starr; however, they evade capture while taking out some of members.

Blue Beetle, last seen being captured by Lady Styx's henchmen, is also dropped into the competition, but without his scarab armed. Caul later meets up with T'morra and Ember at a bar, where they inform Caul of Beetle's presence, because his residual Green Lantern energy might have an effect on Beetle's Reach armor. Captain K'rot with his team, Sleen and Pig-Iron, are trying to claim Beetle's Scarab. The Scarab activates to protect its unconscious host. During their altercation with Beetle, they run into Caul, which causes the Scarab to go berserk. Once Caul gets far away enough from Beetle, Jaime Reyes regains control and flies away. Star Hawkins and Ilda, a robot uploaded with the personality and memories of his deceased wife, arrive to cloak Caul and tell him the location of his Green Lantern power battery.

Back at T'morra's bar, Starr and Ember are attempting to convince Stealth to join their crew. T'morra thinks that they could use reverse-propaganda, to turn the tables on the game, because Stealth is one of the longest living contestants in The Hunted. Ember tails Stealth, wanting to be friends and learn from her.

Blue Beetle is tracked by another Hunted contestant, a New God named Lonar, who has plans for Beetle.

Hawkins informs Caul of his power battery's location—a pocket dimension inside Bleeding Adonis' palace. K'rot is hired by an unknown party to steal Caul's battery and relocate it. During their individual attempts to gain access to Adonis, they become aware of each other's presence. K'rot decides to help Caul find his power battery. Ilda sacrifices her current body to keep Caul from getting caught.

Meanwhile, Adonis's secretary informs him of Lady Styx' negotiations with a collector, Brainiac, and that Adonis must relocate himself and his possessions. Before Adonis is able to make his exit, K'rot and Caul attempt to ambush Adonis, and gain access to his pocket dimension. However, Brainiac bottles Sh'diki Borough, leaving them trapped inside. Caul convinces Adonis to give him the power battery. After Caul charges his ring, Brainiac's drones attack him. Brainiac is revealed to be K'rot's mysterious benefactor.

Stealth and Ember are outside of the city when it gets bottled, but Ember gets shot in the head while they're on the move.

Caul manages to break the membrane around the bottled city, enlarging himself. He gets into a brief altercation with Brainiac, but Brainiac allows Caul to leave the ship unharmed, not wanting to damage his collection of bottled cities. Caul decides to abandon the others trapped in the city, only to have a change of heart, revealing that he had uploaded Ilda's memory chip into Brainiac's ship. Ilda is able to take control of the ship and then Brainiac. Brainiac quickly takes back control of his body, ejecting both Caul and the bottled city out of his ship. Ilda is later uploaded to a newly ordered body by Hawkins.

In T'morra's bar, it is revealed that Stealth ran off after Ember's apparent death. Ember regrows from a tree while having a conversation with T'morra. Hawkins interrupts their chat to discuss Lonar and his team-up with Blue Beetle. Their conversation is disrupted by news alerts about Caul, now utilizing his power ring, re-entering Tolerance airspace. After seeing a crowd cheering for Caul's return, Stealth begins to realize that T'morra's reverse-propaganda tactic might work.

Elsewhere, Lonar tells Blue Beetle that he is able to remove the Reach Scarab in return for his help.

With Caul's rising popularity as a hero, Adonis plans to exploit him in merchandising for more profit. After deciding to pitch the bottled city into the sun, he has a change of heart and continues on to Tolerance. Upon entering the Tolerance's space sector, he is contacted by Adonis who patches him into a call with Lady Styx. He is allowed safe passage and returns the city back to its location, but unable to enlarge the city back to proper size. He later is teleported elsewhere by Styx.

Stealth finally decides to join T'morra and his reverse-propaganda campaign with Caul; surprised that Ember is still alive after seeing her die, she learns that Ember is actually a plant. Meanwhile, Lonar and Beetle approach the bottled city using cloaking technology. Lonar disables Beetle's cloaking disc, using him as a distraction, while he enters the city and kills Adonis. Lonar picks up Adonis' pocket dimension, and disappears. Later Hawkins, Stealth, and Ember are ambushed by the Crimson Thrust and Lady Styx's soldiers. The barmaid is revealed to have been an actress, with Crimson Thrust all being actors as well.

Caul reappears in an office setting, where he is informed that The Hunted has been cancelled. In the same office, Beetle is sent back to Earth by a producer of the show. T'morra is revealed to have been the showrunner of The Hunted; he had been inserted into the show to advance the plots and keep all of the participants active. After a brawl between the two, T'morra offers Caul a lead role on a new show, Team Cauldron with the rest of his friends and Hunted competitors. Caul agrees to the role, having his power ring re-embedded into his chest. He is granted a meeting with Styx to finalize his new role. As soon as Caul materializes at her base, he is killed by multiple gunshots, as planned by T'morra. In a glimmernet commercial, it is shown that T'morra replaces Caul in the proposed new show, with a name change to T'morra Never Comes.

=== Larfleeze (backup) ===
Larfleeze kidnaps and enlists Pulsar Stargrave as a scribe for a biography about himself, wanting a book similar to Guardians of the Universe's Book of Oa. Larfleeze begins dictating his history to Stargrave, before his ring receives a news alert about an Orange Lantern; Larfleeze goes to investigate. Upon returning, after realizing someone had played a joke on him, he finds he had been robbed of all of his belongings, including his Orange Lantern Power Battery. After questioning Stargrave, who had been knocked unconscious, about what had transpired, Larfleeze seeks out the Star Rovers. While attempting to negotiate with them, they are attacked by Orange Lantern constructs, which Larfleeze has no apparent control over. The constructs disperse after Larfleeze is hit in the head. After a discussion with Stargrave, the Star Rovers agree to help Larleeze find his belongings, free of charge. The Star Rovers take Larfleeze and Stargrave to a space diner, where they had set up a meeting with Branx Rancor, a treasure hunter. After a brawl about the pricing of Rancor's services, they are attacked by L.E.G.I.O.N. Larfleeze's constructs act without his control again. The situation calms down and an agreement is reached by all parties involved; it is later revealed that Sayd is the true mastermind, previously thought dead. Sayd had tampered with Larfleeze's power ring and placed post-hypnotic suggestions into Larfleeze's subconscious, as revenge for enslaving her, causing Larfleeze to destroy all of his belongings without any memory.

=== Star Hawkins (backup) ===
Hawkins intends to sell pictures of a political figure in engaging in an extramarital affair. T'morra intervenes, destroying the pictures and hires him to find out the identity of "The Legend", the first and longest surviving The Hunted competitor, and to bring them in. While investigating, he and Ilda are detained by the Crimson Thrust and told that The Legend wants to meet them. After being escorted to the Legend, it is revealed that The Legend is in fact Lady Styx, the ruler of the Tenebrian Dominion. Ilda initiates a purge protocol, acting as a bomb and distraction for Hawkins to escape. Grabbing a gun from a member of the Crimson Thrust, he escapes. Upon leaving Styx's base, Caul unexpectedly materializes in front of him; out of reflex, Hawkins shoots Caul multiple times.

== Characters ==
Threshold features a variety of characters, some are revamped versions of previously existing characters, while others are created just for the series.

- Jediah Caul, a member of the Green Lantern Corps, working deep cover in a restricted sector.
- Blue Beetle
- Space Ranger
- Stealth
- Star Hawkins and his robot, Ilda.
- The Zoo Crew, with members Captain K'Rot, Sleen, and Pig-Iron
- Colonel T'om T'morra
- Lady Styx
- Bleeding Adonis, the host of The Hunted.

In the Larfleeze backup:

- Pulsar Stargrave
- Sayd
- Star Rovers
- L.E.G.I.O.N.
