= Twilight (comic book) =

1990-1991 three-issue prestige format miniseries

- Twilight #1, art by José Luis García-López.

Publication information
- Publisher: DC Comics
- Schedule: Monthly
- Format: Miniseries
- Genre: Science fiction
- Publication date: December 1990 – February 1991
- No. of issues: 3
- Main character(s): Tommy Tomorrow; Star Rovers

Creative team
- Created by: Howard Chaykin; José Luis García-López
- Written by: Howard Chaykin
- Artist: José Luis García-López
- Letterer: Ken Bruzenak
- Colorist: Steve Oliff
- Editor(s): Kevin Dooley; Andy Helfer

Twilight is a three-issue prestige format miniseries by Howard Chaykin and José Luis García-López published in 1990 by DC Comics.

== Plot ==
Twilight attempted to bring in all of DC's future science/space characters, many originally from the 1950s and 1960s, into one series (despite the fact that many occurred in different time periods). It was another radical revamp of DC characters, including Tommy Tomorrow, the Star Rovers, Star Hawkins, Manhunter 2070 and Space Cabbie. Tommy Tomorrow is presented as an unbalanced individual who ran the Planeteers very autocratically, using them against his enemies, such as their rivals, the Knights of the Galaxy.

== See also ==
- Twilight of the Superheroes, a proposal by Alan Moore which is sometimes referred to as Twilight. Like Chaykin's series, it crosses over many DC characters (though not specifically science/space characters) and presents many of them as unbalanced or debased.
