= Sid Greene =

American comic book artist

- Sid Greene
- Born: Sidney Greene; June 18, 1906 Brooklyn, NY
- Died: October 21, 1972 (aged 66) San Francsico, CA
- Areas: Penciller, Inker
- Notable works: Batman; Green Lantern; Justice League of America; The Atom

Sidney Greene (June 18, 1906 – October 1972) was an American comic book artist known for his work for a host of publishers from the 1940s to 1970s. As an inker on DC Comics series including Batman, Green Lantern, Justice League of America and The Atom, he helped to define the company's house style for its 1960s Silver Age superheroes.

== Biography ==
=== Early career ===
Sid Greene broke into comics during the 1930s to 1940s period fans and historians call the Golden Age of Comic Books. Initially, he freelanced at Funnies, Inc., one of the early "packages" that supplied comic books on demand for publishers testing the new medium. His first confirmed work, during a time when published credits were not routinely given in comics, is as penciler and inker of a nine-page "Spark Stevens" story in Fox Comics' The Green Mask #5 (June 1941), although Greene has been tentatively identified on stories in issues of Fiction House's Planet Comics and Fight Comics cover-dated as early as April 1940. His first signed work is as penciler-inker of a 10-page story starring the superhero the Patriot in The Human Torch #5[a] (Summer 1941), published by Timely Comics, the Golden Age forerunner of Marvel Comics.

Through 1943, Greene drew the adventures of Target and the Targeteers in Novelty Press' Target Comics, and penciled a small number of Captain America and Miss America stories for Timely. During the decade, he also penciled comic-book stories for Ace Comics, Eastern Color, and Hillman Periodicals. For Holyoke Publishing, he drew the features "Fangs", "Inspector Hunt", and "Speed Spaulding".

=== Joining DC Comics ===
In the 1950s, after doing at least one story for Avon Comics, Greene did anthological horror, crime and romance comics for Atlas Comics, that decade's forerunner of Marvel Comics, and also drew romance stories for DC Comics, Orbit Publications, Quality Comics, and Ziff-Davis. His first known story for DC, where he would become best known during the imminent Silver Age of Comic Books, was the six-page "The Wrong Love", in Secret Hearts #18 (Nov. 1953). His first science fiction for DC was the eight-page "Earth Is the Target" in Mystery in Space #26 (July 1955), an anthology series in which Greene and writer Gardner Fox would co-create the team Star Rovers in issue #66 (March 1961).

Well into the early 1960s, Greene contributed many dozens of anthological science-fiction stories to Mystery in Space and Strange Adventures. He also drew all six issues of DC's The New Adventures of Charlie Chan (June 1958 - April 1959), starring the long-running fictional Chinese-American detective of novels and films.

=== Silver Age superheroes ===
Greene's first DC superhero work was inking Gil Kane on a backup Atom story in The Atom #8 (Sept. 1963). Along with Murphy Anderson, he became one of Kane's two regular inkers on that series, which generally featured two Atom stories each issue. Greene also soon became Kane's regular inker on Green Lantern, beginning with issue #29 (June 1964). As historian Daniel Herman wrote, "Finally, Kane had somebody who could keep up with his frenetic pacing and full-bodied anatomy."

Greene soon became one of editor Julius Schwartz's most prolific inkers, one whose work helped define the DC look of the mid to late 1960s. He began inking the Elongated Man backup feature in Detective Comics, over penciler Carmine Infantino, and Batman stories over, initially, penciler Sheldon Moldoff (ghosting for Bob Kane), beginning in Batman #169-170, 172-174 (Feb.-March 1965, May–July 1965). Greene soon became, as well, one of the regular Batman inkers in Detective Comics, including on issue #359 (Jan. 1967), the debut of Batgirl, with penciler Infantino — all while continuing to ink the adventures of the previous three characters mentioned.

In addition to all this, Schwartz assigned Greene to succeed the retired Bernard Sachs as regular inker on the publisher's primary superhero-team series, Justice League of America, beginning with issue #46 (Aug. 1966). Greene "added a new crispness to Mike Sekowsky's pencils for three years until [Greene]'s retirement in 1969." As Herman assessed, "Although Greene had a strong personality as a penciler, as an inker, he was able to successfully submerge his style and to highlight the pencilers he was embellishing." As a gesture of appreciation toward editor Schwartz, Greene in many Mystery in Space and Strange Adventures stories would draw characters who resembled him.

Late in his career, Greene also returned to Marvel Comics, for whose predecessor companies he had drawn in the 1940s and 1950s. Freelancing, he inked George Tuska on a 20-page story of the jungle lord Ka-Zar in Marvel Super-Heroes #19 (March 1969); and the 20-page story in the superspy series Nick Fury, Agent of S.H.I.E.L.D. #12 (May 1969), co-inking Barry Windsor-Smith (then billed as Barry Smith) in one of the future industry star's earliest professional works.

After his final issue of Justice League (#73, Aug. 1969), Greene inked one last superhero story, the lead feature in Atom and Hawkman #45 (Nov. 1969). He then both penciled and inked stories in two issues each of Our Army at War and the supernatural anthology The Unexpected, plus one story each in The Witching Hour and House of Secrets. His stories in The Unexpected #117 and House of Secrets #84 (both cover-dated March 1970, and drawn at least three months earlier) mark his final published works.

=== Death ===
Sid Greene died in San Francisco, CA on October 21, 1972.
