= Murray Boltinoff =

American comic book artist (1911–1994)

- Boltinoff in the 1970s. Photo by Jack Adler.
- Born: January 3, 1911 New York City, U.S.
- Died: May 6, 1994 (aged 83) Pompano Beach, Florida, U.S.
- Areas: Writer, Editor
- Pseudonyms: Woody Adams, Blair Bolton, Ray Bolton, Al Case, Anne Case, Bill Dennehy, Bob Donnely, Evan Douglas, Wesley Marsh, and Sam Meade

Murray Boltinoff (January 3, 1911 – May 6, 1994) was an American writer and editor of comic books who worked for DC Comics from the 1940s to the 1980s, in which role he edited over 50 different comic book series.

== Biography ==
A graduate of New York University, in 1933 Boltinoff was hired as an assistant editor at the New York American—the first newspaper to hire his younger brother Henry Boltinoff as a cartoonist. Although Craig Yoe has stated that "Murray had got Henry [the] job", Comics historian Don Markstein reported that it was actually more difficult for Henry to sell artwork to Murray, as "both [strove] to avoid any appearance of favoritism". Henry Boltinoff subsequently began selling cartoons to Whitney Ellsworth at National Allied Publications, and suggested that Ellsworth hire Murray as an assistant, which Ellsworth did circa 1940.

As an editor, he oversaw the creation of the Doom Patrol in My Greatest Adventure, and came up with their tagline, "The World's Strangest Heroes". When the Doom Patrol series was canceled in 1968, Boltinoff and artist Bruno Premiani appeared in the story to urge readers to keep the series alive. Boltinoff revived Metamorpho as the backup feature in World's Finest Comics #218–220 and #229 after the character had a brief run as the backup in Action Comics #413–418. Gina Misiroglu has described Boltinoff as Metamorpho's "savior" from post-cancellation obscurity due to his "tendency to stick [Metamorpho] into whichever comic [Boltinoff] happened to be working on at the time." The character's creator Bob Haney later reported having read an interview in which Boltinoff claimed to have created Metamorpho, and attributed this to senility on Boltinoff's part. Haney was not the only one to comment on Boltinoff's memory: Superboy and the Legion of Super-Heroes writer Jim Shooter recounted that Boltinoff "would forget the character's [super-]powers" and "seemed to have early stage Alzheimer's. Seriously. Ask his former assistant, Jack Harris. Murray would give me instructions, forget what he'd said, then be upset that I hadn't followed some orders he'd never given me. I ended up doing rewrites because Murray misremembered things."

While editing Superboy and the Legion of Super-Heroes, his actions included rejecting Dave Cockrum's proposal for a new character on the grounds that the character was "too weird looking" and hiring Mike Grell as artist. After Cockrum left DC and joined Marvel Comics, he repurposed the rejected character as Nightcrawler. Grell subsequently described his conflict with Boltinoff over the lack of racial diversity in the Legion's 30th-century setting, noting that Boltinoff had forbidden him from representing a corrupt police officer (in Superboy #207's "The Rookie Who Betrayed the Legion") as that setting's first black character, on the grounds that "'You can't do that because there's something negative in that character.' (...) Murray felt that would make the character appear weak" and "we've never had a black person in the Legion of Super-Heroes, and now you're gonna have one in there who's not perfect"; Boltinoff also promised Grell that a black character was forthcoming and, in Superboy #216 (April 1976), Tyroc was introduced.

Murray Boltinoff retired from the comics industry in 1988. His final editing credit was Sgt. Rock #422 (July 1988).

== Bibliography ==
As editor unless noted:

=== DC Comics ===
- Action Comics #393–418 (1970–1972)
- Adventure Comics #66–81 (1941–1942)
- The Adventures of Bob Hope #87–109 (1964–1968)
- The Adventures of Jerry Lewis #83–124 (1964–1971)
- All-Out War #1–6 (1979–1980)
- Blackhawk #196–198 (1964)
- The Brave and the Bold #50–51, 53–54, 78–131 (1963–1964, 1968–1976)
- Challengers of the Unknown #28–77 (1962–1970)
- DC Special #2, 10, 22–25 (1968–1971, 1976)
- DC Special Series #4, 7, 22 (1977–1980)
- Doom Patrol #86–121 (1964–1968)
- Falling in Love #106–121 (1969–1971)
- 1st Issue Special #3 (1975)
- The Fox and the Crow #86–108 (1964–1968)
- Ghosts #1–72 (1971–1979)
- G.I. Combat #174–288 (1974–1987)
- Girls' Romances #139–155 (1969–1971)
- Hawkman #26–27 (1968)
- House of Secrets #57–65 (1962–1964)
- Limited Collectors' Edition #C–32 (1974)
- The Losers Special #1 (1985)
- The Many Loves of Dobie Gillis #25–26 (1964)
- My Greatest Adventure #71–85 (1962–1964)
- Our Fighting Forces #163–181 (1976–1978)
- Plastic Man #1–10 (1966–1968)
- Secret Six #1 (1968)
- Secrets of Sinister House #16–18 (1974)
- Sgt. Rock #410–422 (1986–1988)
- Showcase #41–44, 46–47, 73, 82–84, 104 (1962–1963, 1968–1969, 1978)
- Stanley and His Monster #109 (1968)
- Star Spangled War Stories #131–133 (1952)
- Star Spangled War Stories vol. 2 #3–17 (1952–1954)
- Sugar and Spike #53–93 (1964–1970)
- Super DC Giant #S–16, S–19, S–23, S–25 (1970–1971)
- Superboy #149–155, 157–164, 166–173, 175–184, 186–223 (1968–1977)
- The Superman Family #164, 166–167, 169–170, 172–173, 175–176, 178–179, 181 (1974–1976)
- Superman's Pal Jimmy Olsen #133–135, 154–163 (1970–1971, 1972–1974)
- Tales of the Unexpected #103–104 (1967)
- Teen Titans #32–43 (1971–1973)
- Tomahawk #82–130 (1962–1970)
- The Unexpected #105–188 (1968–1978)
- The Witching Hour #14–85 (1971–1978)
- World's Finest Comics #215–222, 224–242 (1972–1976)

Preceded by Jack Schiff	Tales of the Unexpected / The Unexpected editor 1967–1978	Succeeded by Jack C. Harris
Preceded by George Kashdan	The Brave and the Bold editor 1968–1976	Succeeded by Dennis O'Neil
Preceded by Mort Weisinger	Superboy editor 1968–1977	Succeeded by Dennis O'Neil
Preceded by Mort Weisinger	Action Comics editor 1970–1972	Succeeded by Julius Schwartz
Preceded by n/a	Ghosts editor 1971–1979	Succeeded by Jack C. Harris
Preceded by Julius Schwartz	World's Finest Comics editor 1972–1976	Succeeded by Dennis O'Neil
Preceded by n/a	The Superman Family editor (with Julius Schwartz); 1974–1977	Succeeded by Dennis O'Neil
Preceded by Archie Goodwin	G.I. Combat editor 1974–1987	Succeeded by n/a
