= Space Museum (comics) =

Publication information
- Publisher: National Comics / DC Comics
- First appearance: Strange Adventures #104 (1959)
- Created by: Gardner Fox

Space Museum was a science fiction comics series published by National Comics (now DC Comics) in their flagship science fiction title Strange Adventures between 1959 and 1964. The series was written by Gardner Fox and was drawn by Carmine Infantino for almost the whole series.

== Publication history ==
Space Museum first appeared in the story "The World of Doomed Spacemen" in Strange Adventures #104 (May 1959), written by creator Gardner Fox under the editorship of Julius Schwartz. The series of 8-page stories was published in rotation with two others, The Atomic Knights and Star Hawkins, and appeared in every third issue of Strange Adventures from #106 - 157 (July 1959 - October 1963), with one last story, "Space Museum of the Dead World", in issue #161 (February 1964) - a total of 20 stories. With the exception of the first tale, which was drawn by Mike Sekowsky and Bernard Sachs, all the other Space Museum stories were drawn by Carmine Infantino. Only the initial story featured on the cover of Strange Adventures.

The first three Space Museum stories were reprinted in the DC Comics science fiction reprint anthology, From Beyond the Unknown #23 -25 (July/August 1973 - November/December 1973), but the title was then cancelled. Eighteen years later, writer Gerry Conway re-introduced the Space Museum concept in "The Secret that Time Forgot" in Justice League of America #206 (September 1982), and in 1984 writer Paul Kupperberg followed in The New Adventures of Superboy #50 (February 1984), this in a 30th-century Legion of Super-Heroes framing sequence by Keith Giffen around a modern-day Superboy story by Kurt Schaffenberger. Two years later, Dan Jurgens returned to the original 25th century Space Museum, incorporating it into Booster Gold's backstory. With the exception of the retrospective origin story of the Museum, "The Startling Secret of The Space Museum" in Secret Origins #50 (August 1990) by editor Mark Waid and Gerard Jones (with Carmine Infantino again returning to the artwork), and two stories set in the Museum - "When Robots Attack" in Legionnaires #68 (February 1999) by Roger Stern and Tom McGraw, and Booster Gold #0 (April 2008) - the few other references since have all been in retellings of or allusions to Booster Gold's origin.

== Fictional history ==
=== Strange Adventures - 1959 - 1964 ===
Space Museum in Strange Adventures was an anthology series set in the 25th century featuring mainly unlinked heroic tales of outer space adventure; with a regular framing sequence that opens and closes each episode with the only continuing characters - Howard Parker and his young son Tommy (and on three occasions his mother) making their monthly visit to the Space Museum. It is a museum dedicated to showcasing the history of five centuries of human space travel, and features many exhibits in transparent display cases, each artifact from an adventure an Earth space traveller had had in outer space. The objects in the display cases are often ordinary, but had all been used to either save Earth or another planet from disaster. During these visits Tommy always asks his father about one exhibit in particular, and Howard Parker then tells his son the story behind the exhibit.

Only one tale does not fit into the normal narrative sequence, when Tommy and two of his friends in the Interplanetary Boy Scouts, using the skills Tommy has learned from the heroic stories he has been told, rescue Earth from aliens bent on stealing all its energy, and also rescue the Space Museum, which has been stolen by them.

=== Later appearances ===
It is later revealed that the Space Museum was established on the site of a military warehouse where Tommy's father was a guard. He "liberated" some of the mementos kept in the warehouse, keeping them in his military footlocker. Because of his knowledge of space history, Tommy's father recognizes aliens who had attacked Earth before attempting to attack Earth again. He is able to use the objects he has saved to stop the aliens, but demolishes the warehouse in the process. The military realizes the value of "historical consciousness" and creates the Space Museum on the site where the warehouse was.

The Space Museum also figures prominently in the origin of the superhero Booster Gold. In 2462, Michael Carter, a disgraced ex-football player is working as a night watchman in the Museum, which is established to be located in Metropolis. Carter steals the robot Skeets, along with an alien power suit, a Legion Flight Ring, a force field belt, and other unspecified items from the displays. He then escapes in Rip Hunter's Time Sphere, a time travel device from the 1960s, to journey back to the 1980s, become a superhero, and get rich and famous on the franchising opportunities.

By 2984, the Space Museum has been renamed the Museum of Heroes and Legends, and has a wing dedicated to the Legion of Super-Heroes, as well as one to Earth's historical superheroes. The Museum appears to have been renamed the Time and History Museum some time later, and it is partly demolished by Xotar on a mission to conquer the 30th century.
