= Tales of the Unexpected (comics) =

- Cover of Tales of the Unexpected #1 (Feb.–March 1956) by Bill Ely.

Publication information
- Publisher: DC Comics
- Schedule: Monthly
- Format: Standard
- Genre: Fantasy; Horror; Science fiction
- Publication date: List: (vol. 1) February–March 1956 – December 1967–January 1968 (vol. 2) December 2006–July 2007
- No. of issues: List: (vol. 1): 104 (continued as The Unexpected) (vol. 2): 8

Creative team
- Written by: List: (vol. 1) Jack Miller Gardner Fox Arnold Drake Otto Binder Dave Wood Bob Haney Carl Wessler (vol. 2) David Lapham Brian Azzarello
- Penciller: List: (vol. 1) John Prentice Leonard Starr Howard Purcell Ruben Moreira Bill Draut Jim Mooney Sheldon Moldoff Bernard Baily Nick Cardy Bob Brown Mort Drucker Murphy Anderson George Roussos John Giunta Jack Sparling Lee Elias (vol. 2) Eric Battle Cliff Chiang
- Inker: List: (vol. 2) Prentis Rollins
- Colorist: List: (vol. 2) Guy Major Patricia Mulvihill
- Editor: List: (vol. 1) Jack Schiff (#1–72 and #83–102) George Kashdan (#73–82) Murray Boltinoff (#103–104) (vol. 2) Bob Schreck (#1–8)

Tales of the Unexpected was a science fiction, fantasy, and horror comics anthology series published by DC Comics from 1956 to 1968 for 104 issues. It was later renamed The Unexpected although the numbering continued and it ended at issue #222 in 1982. The title was revived as a limited series in 2006.

== Publication history ==
=== Original series ===
In response to the restrictions imposed by the Comics Code Authority, DC began a new science-fiction series in 1956. The series featured artwork by Murphy Anderson, Gil Kane, and many others, with stories by John Broome, Gardner Fox, and additional writers. It was an anthology comic for many years, publishing a variety of science fiction stories. The series featured Space Ranger as of issue #40 and running through #82 (April–May 1964). Other features included the "Green Glob" (issues #83–98, 100, 102, 103) and "Automan" (issues #91, 94, 97). The series' last issue as Tales of the Unexpected was #104 (December 1967–January 1968). As of issue #105 (February–March 1968), the title was shortened to The Unexpected.

=== 2006 limited series ===
DC revived the title for an eight-issue miniseries in 2006, focusing on the Crispus Allen incarnation of the Spectre, with a back-up series featuring Doctor Thirteen.

The back-up feature starred a team made up of Thirteen and his daughter Traci, I…Vampire, Genius Jones, Captain Fear, Infectious Lass, Anthro, the Primate Patrol, and the Haunted Tank. It was written by Brian Azzarello and drawn by Cliff Chiang.

== Collected editions ==
- Showcase Presents: Tales of the Unexpected collects Tales of the Unexpected #1–20, 512 pages, August 2012, ISBN 1401235204
- The Jack Kirby Omnibus Volume 1 includes stories from Tales of the Unexpected #13, 15–18, and 21–24, 304 pages, August 2011, ISBN 1401231071
- Crisis Aftermath: The Spectre includes the Spectre lead stories from Tales of the Unexpected vol. 2 #1–3, 144 pages, May 2007, ISBN 1401213804
- Spectre: Tales of the Unexpected collects the Spectre lead stories from Tales of the Unexpected vol. 2 #4–8, 128 pages, December 2007, ISBN 1401215068
- Doctor 13: Architecture and Mortality collects the Doctor 13 backup stories from Tales of the Unexpected vol. 2 #1–8, 144 pages, September 2007, ISBN 1401215521
