= The Witching Hour (DC Comics) =

DC comics

- The Witching Hour #1 (February–March 1969), art by Nick Cardy.

Publication information
- Publisher: DC Comics
- Schedule: Bimonthly, then monthly
- Genre: Horror
- Publication date: List: Vol. 1 February–March 1969 – October 1978 Vol. 2 1999–2000 One-shot December 2013
- No. of issues: List: Vol. 1: 85 Vol. 2: 3 One-shot: 1
- Main character(s): The Three Witches (Morded, Mildred, and Cynthia)

Creative team
- Written by: List: Vol. 1 Alex Toth Dennis O'Neil Gerry Conway Steve Skeates Marv Wolfman George Kashdan Carl Wessler Vol. 2 Jeph Loeb One-shot Steve Beach Lauren Beukes Kelly Sue DeConnick Mariah Huehner Ales Kot Brett Lewis Toby Litt Annie Mok Lilah Sturges
- Penciller: List: Vol. 1 Alex Toth Jack Sparling Bernie Wrightson José Delbo Neal Adams Gil Kane Dick Giordano Gray Morrow Jim Aparo John Calnan E. R. Cruz Nestor Redondo Win Mortimer Tony DeZuniga Alfredo Alcala Sal Amendola Alex Niño Ruben Yandoc Frank Redondo Jess Jodloman Fred Carrillo Ken Landgraf Vol. 2 Chris Bachalo One-shot Steve Beach Mark Buckingham Emily Carroll Cliff Chiang Ming Doyle Gerhard Human Morgan Jeske Tula Lotay Shawn McManus
- Inker: List: Vol. 1 Vince Colletta Jack Abel Vol. 2 Art Thibert
- Editor: List: Vol. 1 Dick Giordano Murray Boltinoff Vol. 2 Karen Berger One-shot Shelly Bond

The Witching Hour is an American comic book horror anthology published by DC Comics from 1969 to 1978.

== Publication history ==
The series was published for 85 issues from February–March 1969 to October 1978. Its tagline was "It's 12 o'clock... The Witching Hour!" and was changed to "It's midnight..." from issue #14 onwards. The series was originally edited by Dick Giordano, who was replaced by Murray Boltinoff with issue #14. Nick Cardy was the cover artist for The Witching Hour for issues #1–6, 11–12, 15–16, 18–52, and 60. Stories in the comic were "hosted" and introduced by three witches, Mordred, Mildred, and Cynthia, initially designed by artist Alex Toth.

After The Witching Hour's cancellation as a result of the "DC Implosion", the title was merged with The Unexpected until issue #209. The witches were later revived along with the hosts of the companion series House of Secrets and House of Mystery as important characters in Neil Gaiman's The Sandman.

== Vertigo limited series ==
Vertigo published an unrelated The Witching Hour limited series by writer Jeph Loeb and artists Chris Bachalo and Art Thibert in 1999–2000.

== 2013 one-shot ==
The Witching Hour title was revived for a one-shot anthology by Vertigo in 2013.

== 2018 crossover storyline ==
Wonder Woman & Justice League Dark: The Witching Hour is a five–part weekly crossover storyline published in two one-shots and the main Wonder Woman and Justice League Dark series. The crossover featured Wonder Woman and Justice League Dark teaming up to defeat Hecate. The entire crossover received positive reviews.

== Critical reception ==
According to Comic Book Roundup, the 2018 series received a score of 8.2 out of 10 based on 98 reviews.

== Collected editions ==
- Showcase Presents: The Witching Hour collects The Witching Hour #1-19, 544 pages, March 2011, ISBN 1-4012-3022-9
- DC Finest: Horror: The Devil's Doorway collects The Witching Hour #3-7 along with other DC horror comics from 1969-1970. ISBN 978-1799502807
