= Strange Adventures =

Comic book from DC comics

- Strange Adventures #1 (September 1950), art by Howard Sherman.

Publication information
- Publisher: (vol. 1, 3 & JSA...); DC Comics (vol. 2 & 4); Vertigo (vol. 5); DC Black Label
- Schedule: (vol. 1); Bimonthly (#1-2, #212-244; Monthly (#3-211) (vol. 2 & JSA...); Monthly
- Format: (vol. 1); Ongoing series (vol. 2, 3, JSA..., and vol. 5); Limited series
- Genre: Horror; Science fiction
- Publication date: List: (vol. 1) August / September 1950 - November 1973 (vol. 2) November 1999 - February 2000 (JSA...) October 2004 - March 2005 (vol. 3) May 2009 - December 2009 (vol. 4) July 2011 (vol. 5) March 2020 - October 2021
- No. of issues: List: (vol. 1) 244 (vol. 2) 4 (JSA...) 6 (vol. 3) 8 (vol. 4) 1 (vol. 5) 12
- Main character: Adam Strange

Creative team
- Written by: Neal Adams, Arnold Drake, Gardner Fox, Jack Miller
- Artist(s): Neal Adams, Steve Ditko, Carmine Infantino, Gil Kane, Bernard Krigstein, Mike Sekowsky, and Alex Toth

Strange Adventures is a series of American comic books published by DC Comics, the first of which was August–September 1950, according to the cover date, and published continuously until November 1973.

== Original series ==
Strange Adventures ran for 244 issues and was DC Comics' first science fiction title. It began with an adaptation of the film Destination Moon. The sales success of the gorilla cover-featured story in Strange Adventures #8 (May 1951) led DC to produce numerous comic book covers with depictions of gorillas. The series was home to one of the last superheroes of the pre-Silver Age of Comic Books era, Captain Comet, created by writer John Broome and artist Carmine Infantino in issue #9. A combination of the "Captain Comet" feature with the "gorilla craze" was presented in issue #39 (December 1953). Other notable series included Star Hawkins which began in issue #114 (March 1960) and the Atomic Knights which debuted in issue #117 (June 1960).

In "The Strange Adventure That Really Happened" in issue #140 (May 1962), real life comics creators editor Julius Schwartz and artist Sid Greene struggle to make writer Gardner Fox recall a story he has written that holds the key to saving the Earth from alien invasion. In a rare acknowledgement of the rest of the DC universe in Strange Adventures, one panel mentions Gardner Fox having previously met the Flash in the iconic Silver Age story "Flash of Two Worlds".

Strange Adventures #180 (September 1965) introduced Animal Man in a story by Dave Wood and Carmine Infantino. The character was revived by writer Grant Morrison in 1988. Writer Bob Haney and artist Howard Purcell created the supernatural character the Enchantress in Strange Adventures #187 (April 1966). The Enchantress appears in the 2016 live-action film Suicide Squad, portrayed by Cara Delevingne.

Initially a science fiction anthology title with some continuing features starring SF protagonists, the series became a supernatural-fantasy title beginning with issue #202, for which it received a new logo. Deadman's first appearance in Strange Adventures #205, written by Arnold Drake and drawn by Carmine Infantino, included the first known depiction of narcotics in a story approved by the Comics Code Authority. The "Deadman" feature served as an early showcase for the artwork of Neal Adams.

With issue #217, the title gained another new logo and began reprinting stories of Adam Strange and the Atomic Knights, among other stories. Several Strange Adventure stories were also reprinted in some of DC Comics' later anthologies such as From Beyond the Unknown.

In 1978, DC Comics intended to revive Strange Adventures. These plans were put on hold that year due to the DC Implosion, a line-wide scaling back of the company's publishing output. When the project was revived a year later, the title was changed to Time Warp and the series was in the Dollar Comics format.

=== Publication history ===
Continuing features in Strange Adventures included:

- Chris KL-99 (issues #1–3, 5, 7, 9, 11, 15)
- Darwin Jones (issues #1, 48, 58, 66, 70, 76, 77, 79, 84, 88, 93, 149, 160)
- Captain Comet (issues #9–44, 46, 49) (cover feature many times)
- Space Museum (issues #104, 106, 109, 112, 115, 118, 121, 124, 127, 130, 133, 136, 139, 142, 145, 148, 151, 154, 157, 161)
- Star Hawkins (issues #114, 119, 122, 125, 128, 131, 134, 137, 140, 143, 146, 149, 152, 155, 158, 162, 173, 176, 179, 182, 185)
- Atomic Knights (issues #117, 120, 123, 126, 129, 132, 135, 138, 141, 144, 147, 150, 153, 156, 160, with reprints in 217–231)
- Faceless Creature from Saturn (issues #124, 142, 153)
- Star Rovers (from Mystery in Space, #issues 159, 163)
- Animal Man (issues #180, 184, 190, 195, 201)
- Immortal Man (issues #177, 185, 190, 198)
- Enchantress (issues #187, 191, 200)
- Deadman (issues #205 to 216)
- Adam Strange (reprints in #217 to 244; new stories in #222, 226 and 227 text stories with illustrations)

=== Awards ===
The series was nominated and awarded several awards over the years, including Alley Awards in 1963 for "General Fantasy", in 1965 for "Best Regularly Published Fantasy Comic", in 1966 for "Best Fantasy/SF/Supernatural Title", in 1967 for "Best Cover" (for issue #207 by Neal Adams), in 1967 for "Best Full-Length Story" ("Who's Been Lying in My Grave?" in issue #205 by Arnold Drake and Carmine Infantino), and the 1967 for "Best New Strip" ("Deadman" by Drake and Infantino).

== Revivals ==
Strange Adventures vol. 2 #1 (November 1999)

=== Vertigo miniseries ===
In 1999, DC Comics' Vertigo imprint released a four-issue mini-series reviving the Strange Adventures title and concept.

It featured stories written by Brian Azzarello, Brian Bolland, Dave Gibbons, Bruce Jones, Joe R. Lansdale, John Ney Rieber, Robert Rodi, Doselle Young and Mark Schultz. Artists included Edvin Biuković, Richard Corben, Klaus Janson, Frank Quitely, James Romberger, and John Totleben. The miniseries is cover-dated November 1999 to February 2000.

=== JSA Strange Adventures ===
JSA Strange Adventures #1 (October 2004), art by John Watson.

In 2004, Strange Adventures was again revived, in modified format, as the six-issue limited series JSA Strange Adventures, which presented a new Golden Age Justice Society of America story incorporating fantasy-fiction themes. It was written by Kevin J. Anderson, with art by Barry Kitson and Gary Erskine. The miniseries is cover-dated October 2004 to March 2005, and was collected in trade paperback in 2010.

=== Strange Adventures (2009) ===
Jim Starlin wrote an eight-issue limited series called Strange Adventures which focused on Adam Strange, Bizarro and Captain Comet, which started in May 2009. This series continued the "Aberrant Six" storyline, as well as plot developments from the Rann/Thanagar Holy War and Countdown to Adventure. This series was collected in trade paperback in 2010.

=== Strange Adventures (2011 Vertigo one-shot) ===
An 80-page Strange Adventures #1, an anthology one-shot, with short science fiction and fantasy stories was released with a July 2011 cover date. Contributing writers and artists include Peter Milligan, Scott Snyder, Jeff Lemire, Brian Azzarello, Eduardo Risso, Paul Pope, and Paul Cornell.

=== Strange Adventures (2020 DC Black Label series) ===
A new Strange Adventures series was written by Tom King with Mitch Gerads and Doc Shaner. The series was released in March 2020, under the DC Black Label imprint. The limited series ran for 12 issues, ending in October 2021. For the 2022 Hugo Awards, the series received an award in the Best Graphic Story category.

== Collected editions ==
- Showcase Presents: Strange Adventures Vol. 1 collects Strange Adventures #54–73, 512 pages, December 2008, ISBN 1-4012-1544-0
- Showcase Presents: Strange Adventures Vol. 2 collects Strange Adventures #74–93, 520 pages, November 2013, ISBN 978-1-4012-3846-9
- The Steve Ditko Omnibus Volume 1 includes Strange Adventures #188: "Don't Bring That Monster to Life" by Otto Binder and Steve Ditko and Strange Adventures #189: "The Way-Out Worlds of Bertram Tilley" by Dave Wood and Ditko, 480 pages, September 2011, ISBN 1-4012-3111-X
- DC Goes Ape collects Strange Adventures #201, 168 pages, October 2008, ISBN 978-1401219352
- Deadman
  - The Deadman Collection hardcover collects Strange Adventures #205–216, 356 pages, December 2001, ISBN 1563898497
  - Deadman Vol. 1 trade paperback collects Strange Adventures #205–213, 176 pages, July 2011, ISBN 0857684175
  - Deadman Vol. 2 trade paperback collects Strange Adventures #214–216, 160 pages, February 2012, ISBN 1781160546
- JSA: Strange Adventures collects JSA: Strange Adventures #1–6, 200 pages, February 2010, ISBN 1401225950
- Strange Adventures collects Strange Adventures volume 3 #1–8, 256 pages, April 2010, ISBN 1401226175
- Adam Strange: The Silver Age Omnibus collects (in addition to Showcase #17–19 and Mystery in Space #53–100, 102) Strange Adventures #157, 217, 218, 220, 221, 222, 224, 226, 235, and 241–243, 848 pages, July 2017, ISBN 9781401272951

== In other media ==
In 2019, WarnerMedia and Greg Berlanti, the producer of The CW's Arrowverse, wanted to produce a "super hero anthology" series under the title Strange Adventures for the streaming service HBO Max. The series had reportedly been in development previously for the DC Universe streaming service. In 2022, Kevin Smith, who was writing the script with Eric Carrasco, said that the series was cancelled.
