= Jack Schiff =

American comic book artist (1909-1999)

- Schiff on the cover of Gang Busters #10 (June–July 1949)
- Born: 1909
- Died: April 30, 1999 (aged 89)
- Areas: Writer, editor
- Notable works: Batman; Detective Comics

Jack Schiff (1909 – April 30, 1999) was an American comic book writer and editor best known for his work editing various Batman comic book series for DC Comics from 1942 to 1964. He was the co-creator of Starman, Tommy Tomorrow, and the Wyoming Kid.

== Biography ==
Jack Schiff entered the comics industry after attending Cornell University. He got his start at Standard Magazines, editing various pulps. At DC Comics, he co-created the original Starman with artist Jack Burnley and editors Whitney Ellsworth, Murray Boltinoff, Mort Weisinger, and Bernie Breslauer in Adventure Comics #61 (April 1941). DC hired Schiff as an editor in 1942 and he oversaw the various Batman and Superman comic book titles after Weisinger was drafted into military service during World War II. He wrote the story "Case of the Costume-Clad Killers" in Detective Comics #60 (Feb. 1942) which introduced the Bat-Signal into the Batman mythos. In addition, he edited and wrote the Batman comic strip for the McClure Newspaper Syndicate and wrote The Vigilante (1947) and Batman and Robin (1949) serials for Columbia Pictures. He developed a series of public service announcements which ran throughout DC's entire publishing line from 1949 to the mid-1960s and scripted the "Johnny Everyman" feature which had been created by Nobel Prize laureate Pearl S. Buck. He launched comic book titles which were licensed from the popular radio programs A Date with Judy, Gang Busters, and Mr. District Attorney and co-created new characters such as Tommy Tomorrow and the Wyoming Kid. His introduction of science fiction concepts into the Batman stories met with mixed results. In 1958, he became involved in a legal dispute with artist Jack Kirby over the "Sky Masters" newspaper comic strip and Schiff won the resulting lawsuit. The following year, he and Dick Dillin created Lady Blackhawk in Blackhawk #133 (Feb. 1959). DC's upper management removed Schiff as editor of Batman and Detective Comics due to low sales and replaced him with Julius Schwartz in 1964. Mystery in Space and Strange Adventures were given to Schiff as replacements to edit. He retired from DC after 25 years with the company and his final editing credit appeared in Strange Adventures #203 (Aug. 1967).

== Awards ==
Jack Schiff received citations and commendations from such organizations as the Anti-Defamation League (1948), the National Conference of Christians and Jews (1953), the United States Office of War Information (1945), and the United States Department of the Treasury (1945).

== Bibliography ==
=== As writer ===
==== DC Comics ====
- Batman #10, 13, 15, 21, 26 (1942–1944)
- Detective Comics #60 (1942)
- World's Finest Comics #8, 15–26, 28, 30, 37, 39 (1942–1949)

=== As editor ===
==== DC Comics ====
- Action Comics #56–118 (1943–1948)
- Adventure Comics #82–194 (1943–1953)
- The Adventures of Alan Ladd #1–9 (1949–1951)
- Aquaman #1–4 (1962)
- Batman #15–163 (1943–1964)
- Big Town #1–3 (1951)
- Blackhawk #108–195 (1957–1964)
- Boy Commandos #2–36 (1943–1949)
- The Brave and the Bold #31–33, 40–41 (1960–1962)
- Buzzy #1–27 (1944–1949)
- Congo Bill #1–7 (1954–1955)
- Challengers of the Unknown #1–27 (1958–1962)
- Dale Evans Comics #1–24 (1948–1952)
- A Date with Judy #1–12 (1947–1949)
- Detective Comics #71–326 (1943–1964)
- Feature Films #1–4 (1950)
- Frontier Fighters #1–8 (1955–1956)
- Gang Busters #1–67 (1947–1958)
- House of Mystery #1–125, 143–169 (1951–1962, 1964–1967)
- House of Secrets #1–56, 66–80 (1956–1962, 1964–1966)
- Leading Comics #6–14 (1943–1945)
- Legends of Daniel Boone #1–8 (1955–1956)
- More Fun Comics #87–107 (1943–1946)
- Mr. District Attorney #1–67 (1948–1959)
- My Greatest Adventure #1–70 (1955–1962)
- Mystery in Space #92–110 (1964–1966)
- Real Fact Comics #1–21 (1946–1949)
- Rip Hunter... Time Master #1–9 (1961–1962)
- Showcase #5–7, 11–12, 15–16, 20–21, 25–26, 30–33 (1956–1961)
- Star-Spangled Comics #16–130 (1943–1952)
- Strange Adventures #164–203 (1964–1967)
- Superboy #1–28 (1949–1953)
- Superman #20–51 (1943–1948)
- Tales of the Unexpected #1–72, 83–102 (1956–1962, 1964–1967)
- Tomahawk #1–81 (1950–1962)
- Western Comics #1–42 (1948–1953)
- World's Finest Comics #8–140 (1942–1964)

Preceded by Whitney Ellsworth	World's Finest Comics editor 1942–1964	Succeeded by Mort Weisinger
Preceded by Whitney Ellsworth	Detective Comics editor 1943–1964	Succeeded by Julius Schwartz
Preceded by Mort Weisinger	Batman editor 1943–1964	Succeeded by Julius Schwartz
Preceded by n/a	House of Mystery editor 1951–1962	Succeeded by George Kashdan
Preceded by Julius Schwartz	Strange Adventures editor 1964–1967	Succeeded by Jack Miller
Preceded by George Kashdan	House of Mystery editor 1964–1967	Succeeded by George Kashdan
Preceded by Julius Schwartz	Mystery in Space editor 1964–1966	Succeeded by Len Wein (in 1980)
