= House of Mystery =

Horror, fantasy, and mystery comics series

The House of Mystery
- Cover of The House of Mystery #1 (December - January 1951), art by Win Mortimer and Charles Paris.

Publication information
- Publisher: DC Comics
- Schedule: Varied between monthly and bi-monthly
- Format: Ongoing series
- Genre: Horror, Fantasy
- Publication date: List: (vol. 1) December 1951 - October 1983 Elvira's House of Mystery January 1986 - January 1987 (vol. 2) July 2008 - October 2011
- No. of issues: List: (vol. 1): 321 Elvira's...: 11, plus 1 special Christmas issue (vol. 2): 42, plus 2 Annuals
- Main character: List: Cain Gregory Andrew Bennett Elvira Martian Manhunter Dial H for Hero

Creative team
- Written by: List: (vol. 1) John Albano T. Casey Brennan J. M. DeMatteis Scott Edelman Steve Skeates Elvira's... Joey Cavalieri Tom and Mary Bierbaum (vol. 2) Lilah Sturges
- Penciller: List: (vol. 1) Curt Swan Bob Brown Neal Adams Bernie Wrightson Gil Kane Frank Springer Al Williamson Tony DeZuniga Wally Wood Jim Aparo Jerry Grandenetti Nestor Redondo Gray Morrow Dick Dillin Bob Oksner Rich Buckler E. R. Cruz Ernie Chan Rudy Nebres Alfredo Alcala Leopoldo Durañona Jess Jodloman John Calnan Howard Chaykin Ruben Yandoc Jim Sherman Marshall Rogers Marc Silvestri Ron Randall Frank Redondo Adrian Gonzales Elvira's... Ron Wagner Bob Oksner Stan Woch Tom Grindberg Dan Spiegle Gerry Talaoc (vol. 2) Luca Rossi
- Inker: List: (vol. 1) Charles Paris George Klein Jack Abel Bruce Patterson Dan Adkins Josef Rubinstein Tony DeZuniga Elvira's... Bob Oksner Dick Giordano Jim Fern
- Editor: List: Jack Schiff (#1–125 and #143–169) George Kashdan (#126–142 and #170–173) Joe Orlando (#174–254) Paul Levitz (#255–275) Jack C. Harris (#276–281) Len Wein (#282–291) Karen Berger (#292–321)

The House of Mystery is a horror, fantasy, and mystery comics anthology published by DC Comics. It had a companion series, The House of Secrets.

== First series ==
=== Genesis ===
The House of Mystery began as a horror anthology, featuring tales of the supernatural as well as supernatural-themed mystery stories. Issue #1 was cover dated December 1950-January 1951. With the growing backlash against American horror comics in the mid-1950s, as well as the advent of the Comics Code Authority and its restrictions on horror-themed storylines (banning stories dealing with such supernatural fare as vampires and werewolves), the series was quietly revamped into dealing with science fiction-type monsters and other mystery/suspense-type tales that were permitted by the Comics Code.

=== Superheroes ===
In the mid-1960s, the series was revamped to include superhero stories. From The House of Mystery #143 (June 1964) to 155 (December 1966), "J'onn J'onzz, the Manhunter from Mars" headlined the book, as his back-up feature from Detective Comics was moved to The House of Mystery. This was followed with the introduction of "Dial H for Hero" in issue #156 (January 1966), which took over as headliner until issue #173 (March–April 1968). The Martian Manhunter was again relegated to back-up status during this time.

=== Return of horror ===
Cain and Gregory move out in the final issue of The House of Mystery, #321 (October 1983), art by Michael Kaluta.

With issue #174, EC Comics veteran Joe Orlando was hired by DC to take over as editor of The House of Mystery. As the Comics Code Authority was now being challenged by both DC and Marvel over content restrictions, the series returned to its overt horror themes. The first issue under Orlando would be a reprint issue of old horror/suspense stories, as the new direction would truly begin with #175 (July–August 1968). The issue would introduce a new figure to the series, Cain, the "able care taker" of the House of Mystery who would introduce nearly all the stories before the series's cancellation. Cain would also host the spin-off humor series Plop! and later become a recurring character in Blue Devil and The Sandman.

Artist Bernie Wrightson's first professional comic work was the story "The Man Who Murdered Himself" which appeared in issue #179 (March–April 1969).

Under Orlando's stewardship, the series won a good deal of recognition in the comics industry, including the "Shazam Award for Best Individual Short Story (Dramatic)" in 1972 for "The Demon Within" in issue #201 by John Albano and Jim Aparo, and the "Shazam Award for Best Humor Story" in 1972 for "The Poster Plague" by Steve Skeates and Sergio Aragonés. Limited Collectors' Edition #C-23 (Winter 1973) featured reprints of House of Mystery stories. House of Mystery #224 (April–May 1974) to 229 (Feb.–March 1975) were in the 100 Page Super Spectacular format.

The series was in the Dollar Comics format for issues #251 (March–April 1977) to 259 (July–August 1978). House of Mystery featured stories by writers T. Casey Brennan (issues #260, 267, 268 and 274) and Scott Edelman (issues #257, 258, 260, 264, 266, 270, 272, 273). Orlando's tenure as editor ended with issue #257 (March–April 1978). Karen Berger became editor of the series with issue #292 (May 1981), her first for DC Comics. Under Berger, the series experimented with long-form storylines in the popular I…Vampire serial created by writer J. M. DeMatteis. "I... Vampire" revolved around the heroic vampire, Andrew Bennett, who sought to defeat his nemesis and former lover Mary Seward, the Queen of Blood. This serial began in issue #290 (March 1981) and would last until issue #319 (August 1983), two issues before the title ended with issue #321 (October 1983).

Since 2006, DC Comics has reprinted stories from the original run: three black and white Showcase Presents volumes have been published, reprinting the series from #174 - 194, #195 - 211 and #212 - 226, respectively. A one-shot reprint in color, Welcome Back to the House of Mystery, featured 10 of the most highly regarded stories as selected by Alisa Kwitney in a Cain wraparound by Neil Gaiman and Sergio Aragonés under the Vertigo Comics imprint. The first issue from 1951 was reissued as a Millennium Edition bearing the Vertigo imprint.

== Elvira's House of Mystery ==
In 1986–1987, DC comics published a new series, Elvira's House of Mystery. It lasted 11 issues, plus a special Christmas issue. The series was a quasi-follow-up of the original series, with famed horror movie hostess Elvira, Mistress of the Dark tasked by the House with finding Cain, though she spent much of her time making fun of him and introducing horror stories similar to the original series. One issue of this series, issue #3, was released without Comics Code Approval and contained significant implied nudity. Editorial comments in later issues stated that the experiment in releasing an unapproved issue was not considered successful.

== 2008 series ==
DC's Vertigo imprint began a new ongoing series in May 2008, written by Lilah Sturges and Bill Willingham. It features at least one different story each issue, told by people trapped in a "purgatory-like house". The series ended in October 2011 with issue #42. Two annuals were also published.

== The house ==
The House of Mystery is north of Louisville, Kentucky, where it was built and abandoned by Colonel Braitwaithe before the American Civil War, and in the Dreaming. Little is known about the House of Mystery in general. Its exterior and interior change periodically, meaning that one never enters the same room twice. The House of Mystery lies in the same graveyard as the House of Secrets, its companion. Cain lives in the House of Mystery, whereas Abel resides in the House of Secrets.

Cain is not the only person to have lived within the House; in addition to boarders, including Mister Mxyzptlk, Elvira, Mistress of the Dark took shelter within the house. Her brief stay in the House of Mystery is notable for two reasons: first, the House of Mystery is established as being the same house throughout its publication history. Three distinct personalities of the house are shown: the original horror House of Mystery, a dark humor "House of Weirdness"-style which harkened back to Cain's stint in Plop!, and the current version of the House of Mystery in Kentucky. The second reason is the timing of Elvira's stay. She took up residence during the Crisis on Infinite Earths. Elvira, tasked by the House of Mystery to find Cain, took over his role of host for a brief period, while Cain was relegated to being the butt of her jokes during occasional cameos.

The House of Mystery possesses sentience, along with mystic powers. It has possessed someone before and merged with the House of Secrets briefly. It was destroyed in The House of Mystery #321 before being restored during Crisis on Infinite Earths.

Batman entered the house in The Brave and the Bold #93, tripped on a floorboard, and would have been shot had his pursuer's gun not jammed. He never actually met Cain, who instead narrates a story about him occurring in Scotland, which climaxes in a castle he describes as "a house of mystery" rather than "the House of Mystery". Superman teamed with Cain against Mxyzptlk, who was attempting to take over the House, in DC Comics Presents #53.

The House of Mystery appears mainly in various Vertigo titles, especially those tied into Neil Gaiman's Sandman; it has appeared briefly in Resurrection Man. Something called the House of Mystery appeared in 52 #18, where it seems to have been used for some time as a base for a team of detectives called the Croatoan Society, which counts both Detective Chimp and Ralph Dibny among its members. It is unclear if the Croatoan's House of Mystery is meant to be the same as the original House of Mystery, a post-Infinite Crisis version of the original House of Mystery, or simply a different location with the same name. Cain's name appeared on this house's mailbox, implying a connection to the original House.

In The New 52's rebooted DC continuity (launched in 2011), the House reappeared in the pages of Justice League Dark, being used as a base for the team. The House is shown to currently belong to John Constantine, who claims to have won the key to the House in a poker game against Doctor Occult and Father Time. Constantine takes his time to adjust to the House of Mystery due to the changing rooms and feels that the House has to play tricks on those who enter it.

== Collected editions ==
- Showcase Presents Martian Manhunter Volume 2 collects the Martian Manhunter stories from The House of Mystery #143–173, 592 pages, May 2009, ISBN 978-1401222567
- Showcase Presents Dial H for Hero Volume 1 collects the Dial H for Hero stories from The House of Mystery #156–173, 288 pages, April 2010, ISBN 978-1401226480
- Showcase Presents The House of Mystery
  - Volume 1 collects The House of Mystery #174–194, 552 pages, February 2006, ISBN 1-4012-0786-3
  - Volume 2 collects The House of Mystery #195–211, 552 pages, March 2007, ISBN 1-4012-1238-7
  - Volume 3 collects The House of Mystery #212–226, 552 pages, January 2009, ISBN 1-4012-2183-1
- The Steve Ditko Omnibus Volume 1 includes stories from The House of Mystery #236, 247, 254, 258, and 276, 480 pages, September 2011, ISBN 1-4012-3111-X
- DC Through the 80s: The End of Eras includes stories from The House of Mystery #286, 290, 294-295, 300, 308, and 321; 520 pages, December 2020, ISBN 978-1779500878
- I...Vampire collects the "I...Vampire" stories from The House of Mystery #290–291, 293, 295, 297, 299, 302, and 304–319, 320 pages, April 2012, ISBN 978-1401233716
- DC Finest: Horror: The Devil's Doorway collects House of Mystery #180–185 along with other DC horror comics from 1969-1970. ISBN 978-1799502807

== Novels ==
Two novels were written by Jack Oleck and illustrated by Bernie Wrightson, both published by Warner Books:

- Tales From The House of Mystery #1 (ISBN 978-0446752268)
- Tales From The House of Mystery #2 (ISBN 978-0446752565)

== In other media ==
- The House of Mystery appears in the DC Animated Movie Universe franchise:
  - First appearing in Justice League Dark, this version is owned by John Constantine and serves as the base of operations for the eponymous group.
  - The House appears in Justice League Dark: Apokolips War, where it was revealed that, shortly before the titular war, it had thrown Constantine out. Black Orchid later uses the House to destroy one of Darkseid's planet killers before being killed by a Parademon.
  - The House appears in Constantine: The House of Mystery, which takes place after the events of Apokolips War. Spectre traps Constantine in an attempt to protect him from being punished for changing the timeline. However, he is unaware of this and ultimately escapes. After this is explained to Constantine, he requests to be placed back in the house and will never attempt to escape again. Spectre explains that he can no longer protect him and Constantine is dragged screaming into a hole in space. What became of the House afterwards is currently unknown.
- The House of Mystery appears in Justice League Action.
- The House of Mystery and House of Secrets, as well as Cain and Abel, appear in The Sandman.
