= John Broome (writer) =

American comic book writer (1913–1999)

- Born: Irving Broome; May 4, 1913
- Died: March 14, 1999 (aged 85) Chiang Mai, Thailand
- Area: Writer
- Pseudonyms: Ron Broom; Edgar Ray Meritt; John Osgood; Robert Stark
- Notable works: All Star Comics; Captain Comet; Elongated Man; The Flash; Green Lantern; Mystery in Space; Strange Adventures
- Awards: Alley Award (1964); Inkpot Award; Bill Finger Award

John Broome (May 4, 1913 – March 14, 1999), who additionally used the pseudonyms John Osgood and Edgar Ray Meritt, was an American comic book writer for DC Comics. Along with Gil Kane, he co-created the Green Lantern Hal Jordan, the supervillain Sinestro and the Green Lantern Guy Gardner.

== Biography ==
=== Early life and career ===
Broome was born Irving Broome to a Jewish family. As a youth, he enjoyed reading science fiction and began writing for science-fiction pulp magazines in the 1940s. By then he was already writing for some of the earliest American comic books to be published, beginning with a two-page "Pals and Pastimes" humor strip, illustrated by Ray Gill, in Centaur Publications' Funny Pages #7 (Dec. 1936). By 1942 he was writing text fillers for Fawcett Comics, at least one under the pseudonym Ron Broom. When his agent, Julius Schwartz, became an editor at what would become DC Comics during the 1930–40s "Golden Age of Comic Books", Broome was recruited to write superhero stories starring the Flash, Green Lantern, Sargon the Sorcerer and others. His first known script for the company was the 13-page Flash story "The City of Shifting Sand" in All-Flash #22 (May 1946). He wrote text fillers under the pen name John Osgood.

Through the 1940s, Broome wrote primarily Green Lantern stories and the superhero team the Justice Society of America, and contributed an occasional tale starring the Atom, the Hawkman, or Doctor Mid-Nite, in titles including Sensation Comics, Comic Cavalcade, All Star Comics, All-American Comics, and Flash Comics. Broome and artist Irwin Hasen created the supervillain Per Degaton as a JSA antagonist in All Star Comics #35 (July 1947). His final Golden Age Green Lantern story appeared in the last issue of that character's title, Green Lantern #38 (May 1949), and his final JSA story in All Star Comics #57 (March 1951), the last before its retitling as All-Star Western.

=== 1950s and the Silver Age ===
As the new decade began, Broome wrote science-fiction stories for DC, both standalone tales—including "The Mind Robbers", in Mystery in Space #1 (May 1951), under the pseudonym Robert Stark—and continuing-character features, such as "Astra" (in Sensation Comics, one story of which teamed him with his future regular artist collaborator, Gil Kane), and "Captain Comet", which he created with penciler Carmine Infantino in Strange Adventures #9 (June 1951). For the latter he used the pen name Edgar Ray Merritt, devised by his friend and editor Julius Schwartz, as a nod to fantasy writers Poe, Bradbury, and Abraham. Outside that genre, he wrote a large number of stories for the crime comics anthology Big Town, based on the radio and television shows.

During this time, Broome created many DC characters and institutions, including the whimsical simian sleuth Detective Chimp, with artist Infantino, in The Adventures of Rex the Wonder Dog #4 (Aug. 1952); the Phantom Stranger, also with Infantino, in Phantom Stranger #1 (Sept. 1952); and the post-apocalyptic heroes the Atomic Knights, with artist Murphy Anderson, in Strange Adventures #117 (June 1960).

With the dawn of what fans and historians call the Silver Age of Comic Books, Broome was instrumental in writing stories of two key characters who helped revive the moribund archetype of the superhero. Following the creation of an all new Flash, a.k.a. Barry Allen, who carried the superhero name from the original Golden Age Flash, by scripter Robert Kanigher and penciler Infantino in Showcase #4 (Oct 1956)—considered the comic that triggered the Silver Age—Broome wrote Flash stories beginning in that very issue. He wrote numerous Flash stories in the character's subsequent series. He co-created several of the character's primary supervillain antagonists including Captain Boomerang in issue #117 (Dec. 1960), the 64th century villain Abra Kadabra in #128 (May 1962), and Professor Zoom in #139 (Sept. 1963). Captain Boomerang was featured in the 2016 Suicide Squad film and was portrayed by actor Jai Courtney. Other Broome additions to the Flash mythos, Kid Flash and the Elongated Man were respectively introduced in issues #110 and 112 as allies of the speedster.

Broome, with penciler Kane and editor-conceptualist Schwartz, created Hal Jordan, the Silver Age Green Lantern, in Showcase #22 (Oct. 1959). He became the character's primary scripter in Green Lantern's solo series as well. Broome's stories for the Green Lantern series included transforming Hal Jordan's love interest, Carol Ferris, into the Star Sapphire in issue #16. Black Hand, a character featured prominently in the "Blackest Night" storyline in 2009–2010, debuted in issue #29 (June 1964) by Broome and Kane. The creative team created Guy Gardner in the story "Earth's Other Green Lantern!" in issue #59 (March 1968). Writer-editor Dennis Mallonee described Broome's work on Green Lantern as the only superhero series in which screwball comedy "was essentially realized", and called Broome "a genius. He wrote about Hal Jordan, not Green Lantern. Hal's total frustration with Carol's completely goofy 'independence' was the reason I got a kick out of the early silver age Green Lantern." Comics historian Brian Cronin examined similar themes in Broome's work in a 2011 column.

In 1964, Schwartz was made responsible for reviving the faded Batman titles and together with Broome and Infantino jettisoned the sillier aspects that had crept into the franchise such as Ace the Bat-Hound and Bat-Mite and gave the character a "New Look" that premiered in Detective Comics #327 (May 1964).

=== Later life ===
In the late 1960s, Broome and his wife, Peggy, moved to Paris, France, where he continued to script for DC Comics. His last Batman story, "Public Luna-Tic Number One!", was published in Detective Comics #388 (June 1969). His final Flash story, "The Bride Cast Two Shadows", appeared in The Flash #194 (Feb. 1970), and his final Green Lantern, "The Golden Obelisk of Qward", in Green Lantern #75 (March 1970).

Broome then retired from comic-book scripting to travel and, eventually, teach English in Japan. He returned to the United States in 1998, attending his first comic-book convention, Comic-Con International.

Broome died March 14, 1999, at age 85, in Chiang Mai, Thailand, while swimming in a hotel pool while vacationing with his wife. His last address of record was the U.S. Embassy, Tokyo, Japan, with his death certificate issued in New York State.

== Awards ==
Broome received a 1964 Alley Award for Best Short Story: "Doorway to the Unknown!" in The Flash #148 (Nov. 1964), with artist Carmine Infantino. He received an Inkpot Award in 1998 and posthumously received the Bill Finger Award for Excellence in Comic Book Writing in 2009.

== Homages ==
An homage to Broome and artist Gil Kane appears in the novel In Darkest Night, which is set in the universe of the Justice League animated series. In the novel, a place in Coast City is named the "Kane/Broome Institute for Space Studies". In the direct-to-DVD film Green Lantern: Emerald Knights the Broome Kane Galaxy is named for him and Gil Kane. In Green Lantern (2011), Broome's Bar is named after him. In the Green Lantern: The Animated Series episode "Steam Lantern," the eponymous character's real name is Gil Broome, Esq. In The Flash episode "The New Rogues", the industrial complex in which the Mirror Master and the Top gain their powers is Broome Industries.

The villain Nathan Broome, who debuted during the Dawn of DC relaunch, is named after John Broome.

== Bibliography ==
=== Comics Magazine Company ===
- Funny Pages #7, 11 (1936–1937)

=== DC Comics ===
- Action Comics #132–133 (Vigilante) (1949)
- Adventure Comics #175 (Superboy); #418 (Doctor Mid-Nite) (1952–1972)
- Adventures of Rex the Wonder Dog #4–46 (1952–1959)
- All-American Comics #77–78, 81, 83–88, 97, 99–102 (Green Lantern) (1946–1948)
- All-American Western #112–113, 115, 121, 123–126 (1950–1952)
- All-Flash #22, 30, 32 (1946–1947)
- All Star Comics #35, 39–57 (Justice Society of America) (1947–1951)
- All-Star Western #66, 68, 70–72, 74–75, 80, 82–90. 92–98, 100–107, 109–115 (1952–1960)
- Batman #172–173, 177–178, 186, 188, 191 (1965–1967)
- Big Town #4–5, 11, 13–50 (1951–1958)
- The Brave and the Bold #46–47, 49 (Strange Sports) (1963)
- Comic Cavalcade #20–22, 24, 27 (Green Lantern) (1947–1948)
- Detective Comics #327, 329, 332, 340–344, 346, 352, 354-355, 357–359, 365–366, 370, 372, 388 (1964–1969)
- The Flash #105–122, 124–128, 130–136, 138–142, 146–149, 152–159, 161, 163–166, 168, 172–174, 176, 182, 188–191, 193–194 (1959–1970)
- Flash Comics #89, 91–93, 95–96, 98–104 (1947–1949)
- Green Lantern #25, 27–28, 30–38 (1947–1949)
- Green Lantern vol. 2 #1–16, 18–22, 24, 27, 29–31, 36, 39–40, 44–47, 49–56, 59, 66, 69–71, 75 (1960–1970)
- Hopalong Cassidy #91, 93, 99–104, 106, 108–111, 114–135 (1954–1959)
- Jimmy Wakely #4, 6 (1950)
- Mystery in Space #1, 5–8, 10–11, 13–17, 25–27, 29, 31, 33–34, 39–40, 42, 49, 53, 55–56, 59–61, 76 (1951–1962)
- New Adventures of Charlie Chan #1–6 (1958–1959)
- Phantom Stranger #1–6 (1952–1953)
- Sensation Comics #57, 70–72, 74, 82 (Sargon the Sorcerer) (1946–1948)
- Showcase #4, 8, 13–14 (The Flash); #22–24 (Green Lantern) (1956–1960)
- Strange Adventures #8–44, 46, 49, 51–60, 62, 66–70, 72–74, 76–78, 81, 84–86, 91, 97–98, 100, 103, 107–108, 110–112, 114–120, 122–123, 125–126, 128–129, 131–132, 134–135, 137–141, 143–144, 146–147, 149–150, 152–153, 155–156, 158, 160 (1951–1964)
- Superboy #27 (1953)
- World's Finest Comics #121 (Green Arrow) (1961)

==== Collected editions ====
- All Star Comics Archives:
  - Volume 8 includes All Star Comics #35, 208 pages, August 2002, ISBN 1-56389-812-8
  - Volume 9 collects All Star Comics #39–43, 192 pages, August 2003, ISBN 1-4012-0001-X
  - Volume 10 collects All Star Comics #44–49, 216 pages, August 2004, ISBN 1-4012-0159-8
  - Volume 11 collects All Star Comics #50–57, 276 pages, March 2005, ISBN 1-4012-0403-1
- The Atomic Knights collects the Atomic Knights stories from Strange Adventures #117, 120, 123, 126, 129, 132, 135, 138, 141, 144, 147, 150, 153, 156, and 160, 192 pages, May 2010 ISBN 978-1-4012-2748-7
- Batman: The Dynamic Duo Archives:
  - Vol. 1 includes Detective Comics #327, 329, and 332, 240 pages, March 2003, ISBN 978-1-56389-932-4
- The Flash Archives:
  - Volume 1 collects Showcase #4, #8, #13–14 and The Flash #105–108, 224 pages, May 1998, ISBN 978-1-56389-139-7
  - Volume 2 collects The Flash #109–116, 240 pages, April 2000, ISBN 978-1-56389-606-4
  - Volume 3 includes The Flash #117–122 and 124, 224 pages, March 2002, ISBN 978-1-56389-799-3
  - Volume 4 includes The Flash #125–128 and 130–132, 216 pages, May 2006, ISBN 978-1-4012-0771-7
  - Volume 5 includes The Flash #133–136 and 138–141, 248 pages, March 2009, ISBN 1-4012-2151-3
  - Volume 6 includes The Flash #142 and 146–149, 240 pages, August 2012, ISBN 978-1-4012-3514-7
- Green Lantern Archives:
  - Volume 1 collects Showcase #22–24 and Green Lantern vol. 2 #1–5, 201 pages, September 1998, ISBN 1-56389-087-9
  - Volume 2 collects Green Lantern vol. 2 #6–13, 210 pages, January 2000, ISBN 1-56389-566-8
  - Volume 3 includes Green Lantern vol. 2 #14–16 and 18–21, 208 pages, May 2001, ISBN 1-56389-713-X
  - Volume 4 includes Green Lantern vol. 2 #22, 24, 27, and 29, 209 pages, July 2002, ISBN 1-56389-811-X
  - Volume 5 includes Green Lantern vol. 2 #30–31 and 36, 240 pages, April 2005, ISBN 1-4012-0404-X
  - Volume 6 includes Green Lantern vol. 2 #39–40 and 44–47, 240 pages, January 2007, ISBN 1-4012-1189-5
  - Volume 7 includes Green Lantern vol. 2 #49–56, 256 pages, September 2012, ISBN 1-4012-3513-1
- Green Lantern Omnibus:
  - Volume 1 includes Showcase #22–24 and Green Lantern vol. 2 #1–16 and 18–21, 640 pages, November 2010, ISBN 1-4012-3056-3
  - Volume 2 includes Green Lantern vol. 2 #22, 24, 27, 29–31, 36, 39–40, and 44–45, 624 pages, November 2011, ISBN 1-4012-3295-7

=== Fawcett Comics ===
- Captain Marvel Adventures #24 (1943)
- Captain Marvel Jr. #48, 51, 54–55, 59–61 (1947–1948)
- Master Comics #24, 78–79 (1942–1947)
- Nyoka the Jungle Girl #9 (1947)

Preceded by Gardner Fox	All Star Comics writer 1947–1951	Succeeded by n/a
Preceded by n/a	Mystery in Space writer 1951–1962	Succeeded by Gardner Fox
Preceded by Gardner Fox	Strange Adventures writer 1951–1964	Succeeded by Gardner Fox and France Herron
Preceded by n/a	The Flash; 1959–1970	Succeeded by Robert Kanigher
Preceded by n/a	Green Lantern vol. 2 writer 1960–1970	Succeeded by Dennis O'Neil
Preceded by Dave Wood	Detective Comics writer 1964–1969	Succeeded by Frank Robbins
