= Mystery in Space =

Sci-fi comic books

- Cover of Mystery in Space #1 (April–May 1951). Pencils by Carmine Infantino, inks by Frank Giacoia.

Publication information
- Publisher: DC Comics
- Schedule: Varied between bi-monthly and monthly.
- Format: Ongoing series
- Genre: Science fiction
- Publication date: April/May 1951–September 1966; September 1980–March 1981
- No. of issues: 117

Collected editions
- Mysteries in Space: The Best of DC Science Fiction Comics: ISBN 0-671-24775-1
- Pulp Fiction Library: Mystery in Space: ISBN 1-56389-494-7

Mystery in Space is a science fiction American comic book series published by DC Comics. The series ran for 110 issues from 1951 to 1966, with a further seven issues continuing the numbering during an early 1980s revival. An eight-issue limited series began in 2006.

Together with Strange Adventures, Mystery in Space was one of DC Comics' major science fiction anthology series. It won a number of awards, including the 1962 Alley Award for "Best Book-Length Story" and the 1963 Alley Award for "Comic Displaying Best Interior Color Work". It featured short science fiction stories and a number of continuing series, most written by well known comics and science fiction writers of the day, including John Broome, Gardner Fox, Jack Schiff, Otto Binder, and Edmond Hamilton. The artwork featured a considerable number of a 1950s and 1960s American comics artists such as Carmine Infantino, Murphy Anderson, Gil Kane, Alex Toth, Bernard Sachs, Frank Frazetta, and Virgil Finlay.

== Original series ==
Directly appealing to American public taste for science fiction in the early 1950s, Mystery in Space was launched by DC Comics with adverts in most of their titles published in early 1951 - proclaiming "The Universe Is The Limit In Every Issue Of Mystery In Space" and "The Magazine That Unlocks The Secrets Of The Future" around a copy of the first cover. The title of the series had been suggested by Whitney Ellsworth to editor Julius Schwartz. Offering "Amazing trips into the unknown", "Astounding adventures on uncharted worlds", and "Astonishing experiments of super-science" the title was modelled on the success of Strange Adventures which began publication the previous year. Like that title, Mystery in Space was an anthology comic featuring a combination of short science fiction stories, science fiction based heroes and super-heroes, and single page articles on subjects associated with space and space technology. It published the Adam Strange series (issues #53–100, #102), and also featured a number of other characters in series of varying length:

- Knights of the Galaxy (issues #1-8)
- Interplanetary Insurance, Inc. (issues #16-25)
- Space Cabbie (issues #21, #24, #26-47)
- Star Rovers (issues #66, #69, #74, #77, #80, #83, #86)
- Hawkman (issues #87-90)
- Space Ranger (issues #92-99, #101, #103)
- Jan Vern, Interplanetary Agent (issue #100, #102)
- Ultra the Multi-Alien (issues #103-110)

Mystery in Space #1 featured "9 Worlds To Conquer", the first 10-page tale of the Knights of the Galaxy by Robert Kanigher (under the name Anthony Dion) with art by Carmine Infantino, together with three eight or ten-page non-series science fiction stories by Gardner Fox and John Broome, the first of a series of single page information pieces "Stars and their legends" and a two-page text article "What do you know about comets?"; establishing a format that would last for some years.

"Space Taxi" in Mystery in Space #21 (August–September 1954) introduced the first long-term series to the title - Space Cabbie (also known as Space Cabby), whose stories involved taking people from planet to planet in a battered space taxi he called "the jalopy" and the scrapes he got into as a result; written by Otto Binder with art by Howard Sherman. There was no indication the story was the first of a series, yet Space Cabby returned just three issues later in "Hitchhiker In Space" (Mystery in Space #24, February–March 1955), and then had an unbroken 22-issue run until "The Riddle of the Rival Space Cabbies!" (Mystery in Space #47, October 1958). The next few issues featured only short stories, and it was almost a year before another continuing series appeared in the pages of Mystery in Space. A story by Gardner Fox and Carmine Infantino, "Menace of the Robot Raiders!" (Mystery in Space #53, October 1959) featured one of the most enduring and fondly remembered space heroes of the next ten years, Adam Strange, in a 10-page tale which led to the best known period for the Mystery In Space title. Adam Strange had begun in a three-issue run in Showcase #17 (November–December 1958), and although DC considered that those issues had not sold sufficiently to warrant granting him his own title, his return a year later in Mystery In Space #53 was to last an impressive 42 appearances over the next seven years. The Adam Strange space opera tales were crafted by Gardner Fox in the Flash Gordon tradition, with the hero caught between two planets and a love a galaxy away, giant menacing robots, dust devils, perils on two worlds, and distinctive art by Carmine Infantino and Murphy Anderson who drew almost all issues until #92 (June 1964). A number of these stories are considered among the finest of the 1960s, including the full-issue tale "The Planet That Came to a Standstill!" (Mystery in Space #75, May 1962), which won comic fandoms Alley Award for the "Best Book-Length Story" of 1962, and was fairly unusual for the time inasmuch as it featured a cross-over with other major DC characters, the Justice League of America. The following year Mystery in Space gained a further Alley Award, for "Comic Displaying Best Interior Color Work" - a result of the stylistic Infantino/Anderson Adam Strange pages.

By issue #71 (November 1961) the number of stories in each issue of Mystery in Space had dwindled to two as the Adam Strange stories increased in size. As well as single stories, a number of other characters filled the title behind Adam Strange. Star Rovers featured in seven issues between 1961 and 1964, written by Gardner Fox and drawn by artist Sid Greene. The Hawkman issues (Mystery in Space #87-90, November 1963-March 1964) followed two three-issue tryouts of the character in The Brave and the Bold #34–36 and #42–44, which had not sold enough copies to launch the character in his own comic but DC decided to give the character a further tryout. For this short series, editor Julius Schwartz replaced Joe Kubert with Murphy Anderson as artist, and utilised an unusual format for the day - the Adam Strange story "The Super-Brain of Adam Strange" in issue #87 led straight into the Hawkman story "The Amazing Thefts of the I.Q. Gang" in the same issue both written by Gardner Fox. In addition, for the first time since he had appeared in the title, Adam Strange was replaced as cover star and Hawkman took the honors. Although the characters returned to solo stories in the following two issues, "Planets in Peril" (Mystery in Space #90, March 1964) was an epic cross-world book-length team-up between Hawkman and Adam Strange. The cover to #90, with an iconic Adam Strange soaring between Earth and his adopted home, Rann, is often cited as one of the classic science fiction covers of the early 1960s, and this issue was also to have significant impact on DC story continuity in later years as the story first established the links between Rann and Hawkman's world, Thanagar. The war between the two planets has been the defining subject of many of both Hawkman's and Adam Strange's stories and mini-series in the 1990s and 2000s as well as a theme running right across many DC titles.

His Mystery on Space series was successful enough to finally launch Hawkman into his own title in 1964. After a final two-part Adam Strange story by Fox/Infantino/Anderson, "The Puzzle of the Perilous Prisons!" (Mystery in Space #91, May 1964), Jack Schiff replaced Julius Schwartz as editor and the series changed significantly. Schiff introduced Space Ranger, a long-running character from Tales of the Unexpected, another DC anthology title he edited, while Adam Strange was given a new writer, Dave Wood, and artist, Lee Elias, as Carmine Infantino had moved with Schwartz to his new titles. Space Ranger would slowly edge Adam Strange out - taking the cover of four of the next ten issues and sharing two more with Adam Strange (neither appeared on the cover to #100 (June 1965)), co-featuring in the story "The Riddle of Two Solar Systems" (Mystery in Space #94, September 1964) and sharing a storyline in the separate stories "The Wizard of the Cosmos" and "The Return of Yarrok of Zulkan" (Mystery in Space #98, March 1965). For issue #100, Adam Strange was reduced to an 8-page story: he did not appear at all in #101 (August 1965), and his last appearance was in the 16-page "The Robot World of Ancient Rann" (Mystery in Space #102, September 1965). Space Ranger ended the following issue with "The Billion-Dollar Time Capsule" (Mystery In Space #103, November 1965), and the title was not to regain its earlier form again. From issue #103 (November 1965) Mystery in Space featured a new character - Ultra the Multi-Alien - but the series was cancelled because of poor sales only a year later with issue #110 (September 1966). The annual circulation statement in issue #110 showed average sales of 182,376 copies, considerably more than most high-selling American comics of the 2010s, although not even in the Top 50 sales at that time and significantly less than 1960s declared sales total of 248,000.

== Revival ==
Fourteen years later, the title was revived with Mystery In Space #111 (September 1980), edited by Len Wein. The revival replaced DC Comics' only other science fiction anthology title at the time, Time Warp, which had recently ended with issue #5 (July 1980). All the stories in the 1980s version of the title were short one-off tales by a number of writers and artists, including younger artists Marshall Rogers, Michael Golden, Joe Staton, Brian Bolland, and Rick Veitch, and longer-established artists like Steve Ditko, Tom Sutton, Joe Kubert, Carmine Infantino and George Tuska. Despite the line-up the series was not a success, ending after seven issues with #117 (March 1981).

== Julius Schwartz tribute ==
In September 2004, DC Comics released DC Comics Presents: Mystery in Space #1, featuring the stories "Crisis on 2 Worlds" written by Elliot S. Maggin with art by J. H. Williams III, and "Two Worlds" by Grant Morrison with art by Jerry Ordway and Mark McKenna. Featuring Adam Strange, with supporting characters Alanna Strange, Elongated Man and his wife, Sue Dibny, this single issue revival was a homage to the original Adam Strange series including an Alex Ross recreation of the Adam Strange cover to Mystery in Space #82 (March 1963). The comic was one of a series of eight tributes to DC editor Julius Schwartz, who had died earlier in the year.

== Limited series ==
Mystery in Space (vol. 2)

Publication information
- Publisher: DC Comics
- Schedule: Monthly
- Format: Limited series
- Genre: Science fiction
- Publication date: November 2006 - June 2007
- No. of issues: 8
- Main character(s): Captain Comet; The Weird

Creative team
- Written by: Jim Starlin
- Penciller(s): Shane Davis; Weird: Jim Starlin
- Inker(s): Matt Banning; Weird: Al Milgrom
- Letterer(s): Phil Balsman; Weird: Jared K. Fletcher
- Colorist(s): Jeromy Cox; Weird: Jim Starlin
- Editor(s): Brandon Montclare; Bob Schreck

Collected editions
- Volume 1: ISBN 1-4012-1558-0
- Volume 2: ISBN 1-4012-1692-7

DC revived Mystery in Space between November 2006 and August 2007 as an eight issue limited series written by Jim Starlin and drawn by Shane Davis. This series featured a new Captain Comet, in a detective story set in the far reaches of the DC Universe. The first seven issues also contained a backup story starring The Weird from the eponymous 1988 miniseries, with art by Starlin. Neither character appeared in the original Mystery in Space series.

== One-shot anthology ==
In 2012 an over-sized Mystery in Space one-shot anthology was published under the Vertigo imprint, featuring stories and artwork by Mike Allred, Paul Pope, Nnedi Okorafor, Michael Kaluta, Robert Rodi, Sebastian Fiumara, Ann Nocenti, Fred Harper, Andy Diggle, Davide Gianfelice, Steve Orlando, Francesco Trifogli, Ming Doyle, and Kevin McCarthy. The covers were drawn by Mike Allred and Ryan Sook.

== 80-page Valentines Giant ==
In January 2019, DC released an 80-page Valentines Special called Mysteries of Love in Space.

== In other media ==
Batman: The Brave and The Bold animated series has an episode named "Mystery In Space". Written by Jim Krieg and directed by Brandon Vietti, it featured Batman, Aquaman, and Adam Strange rescuing Alanna Strange and Rann from certain doom.

== Collected editions ==
- Mysteries in Space: The Best of DC Science Fiction Comics, includes Mystery in Space #1, 8, 11, 19, 28, 35, 42, 49, 61, and 74–75, Fireside Books, October 1980, ISBN 0-671-24775-1
- Pulp Fiction Library: Mystery in Space includes Mystery in Space #1–2, 6–7, 18–19, 30, 35, 63, 69, 101, 103, 113–115, and 117, 208 pages, September 1999, ISBN 1-56389-494-7
- Showcase Presents: Adam Strange includes Mystery in Space #53–84, 512 pages, August 2007, ISBN 1-4012-1313-8
- Showcase Presents: Justice League of America Vol. 1 includes Mystery in Space #75, 544 pages, December 2005, ISBN 1-4012-0761-8
- Showcase Presents: Hawkman Vol. 1 includes Mystery in Space #87–90, 560 pages, March 2007, ISBN 1-4012-1280-8
- The Steve Ditko Omnibus Volume 1 includes stories from Mystery in Space #111, 114–116, 480 pages, September 2011, ISBN 1-4012-3111-X
- Mystery In Space Vol. 1 collects Mystery in Space vol. 2 #1–5, 208 pages, October 2007, ISBN 1-4012-1558-0
- Mystery In Space Vol. 2 collects Mystery in Space vol. 2 #6–8 and the original The Weird miniseries, 288 pages, May 2008, ISBN 1-4012-1692-7

=== UK reprints ===
Two British companies reprinted DC's science fiction stories from Mystery In Space during the 1950s and 1960s.

L. Miller & Son, Ltd. who also reprinted Captain Marvel's adventures for a British audience published nine issues of Mystery In Space, a 28-page A4-sized magazine, between 1952 and 1954, while Strato, a subsidiary of publishers Thorpe & Porter published thirteen issues of a 68-page A4 size magazine with the same title between 1954 and 1956. Both featured black and white reprints of DC's Mystery In Space and Strange Adventures stories with slightly adapted covers from the original Mystery In Space series.

Thorpe & Porter published a hardback Mystery In Space Annual in 1968. Although it used the cover to Mystery In Space #95, the contents of the annual were complete random issues of remaindered comics from a number of companies including their covers, and not Mystery In Space stories.
