= The Pentacle (comics) =

- The Pentacle on the cover to Shadowpact #3 (September 2006). Clockwise from upper left: Sister Shadow, White Rabbit, Jack of Fire, Strega, Kid Karnevil, Bagman.

Publication information
- Publisher: DC Comics
- First appearance: Shadowpact #1 (July 2006)
- Created by: Bill Willingham

In-story information
- Member(s): Strega; Jack of Fire; White Rabbit; Sister Shadow; Bagman; Karnevil

The Pentacle, or Pentacle, is a DC Comics supervillain group, a team that served as counterparts to the superhero group Shadowpact. Created by Bill Willingham, the Pentacle first appeared in Shadowpact #1 (July 2006).

== Fictional team biography ==
In their first appearance, the Pentacle takes over a small part of a town and creates an impenetrable barrier around it. As soon as Shadowpact enters the bubble, Nightshade encounters a member of the Pentacle, Sister Shadow, and the two quickly begin fighting.

Meanwhile, the rest of the Pentacle becomes aware of Shadowpact's presence and the two groups began to fight each other. During each fight, it was shown that the Pentacle mirrors Shadowpact. While all members of the Pentacle take down their counterparts, each is instructed to not kill them and to bring their unconscious Shadowpact member to Strega so they could imprison them. However, Karnevil refuses to follow orders. Instead of bringing his counterpart, Detective Chimp, to Strega, Karnevil ties him to a post and prepares to torture him.

When Karnevil returns to Strega without Detective Chimp, Strega demands that he retrieve Detective Chimp so they can put him with the rest of his teammates. By the time Karnevil returns to the post, Detective Chimp has escaped, after which he easily subdues Karnevil. Another member of the Pentacle, White Rabbit, is disgusted by Strega's ways of killing and frees Shadowpact. However, Enchantress takes him out, believing that he still cannot be trusted. While Enchantress and Nightmaster create a spell to destroy the barrier, the rest of the team (excluding Detective Chimp) takes down the remaining members of the Pentacle. When Detective Chimp finally catches up with the three, Enchantress' spell takes effect, destroying the barrier. The members of Shadowpact realize that while they were in the barrier, a year had passed by in the outside world.

Blue Devil sends Jack of Fire to Hell, while the remaining four members of the Pentacle are imprisoned in the Black Tower, a prison in another dimension. Strega later escapes the Black Tower and forms an alliance with Doctor Gotham, only for him to betray and kill her. Separately, Karnevil escapes the Tower and becomes an independent villain.

== Membership ==
- Strega - The leader of the Pentacle and a counterpart of Shadowpact member Enchantress. Strega is a sorceress whose spells are primarily powered by blood.
- Jack of Fire (Jack Cassidy) - The counterpart of Shadowpact member Blue Devil. Jack has demonic strength and durability and can create blasts of fire. He claims to be Blue Devil's older brother.
- White Rabbit - The counterpart of Shadowpact member Nightmaster. A highly skilled albino swordsman, he possesses an enchanted sword that can cause unconsciousness with even a light scratch. He despises mass murder.
- Bagman - The counterpart of Shadowpact member Ragman. Bagman can transform into goo, allowing him to absorb and digest matter.
- Sister Shadow - The counterpart of Shadowpact member Nightshade. She can transform into varied shadow creatures.
- Karnevil (Jeremy Karne) - The counterpart of Shadowpact member Detective Chimp. Karnevil has no powers, but he is a sociopathic teenager who is obsessed with murder. He claims he died and went to Hell, but was returned to life because he was too much trouble for the demons.
