= Nightshade (DC Comics) =

Comic book superhero published by DC Comics

- Nightshade taken from a page of Captain Atom #87 (August 1967), art by Jim Aparo.

Publication information
- Publisher: Original: Charlton Comics; Current: DC Comics
- First appearance: Captain Atom #82 (September 1966)
- Created by: David Kaler (writer); Steve Ditko (artist)

In-story information
- Alter ego: Eve Eden
- Species: Homo magi
- Team affiliations: Shadowpact; Suicide Squad; Onslaught; L.A.W. InterC.E.P.T. Justice League
- Partnerships: Captain Atom; King Faraday
- Abilities: Shadow magic; Shadow manipulation; Shadow absorption; Shadow teleportation; Shadow homunculi; Shadow transformation; Superhuman strength; Superhuman durability; Intangibility; Phasing; Flight; Basic combat skills

Nightshade is a superhero appearing in American comic books published by DC Comics. Created by David Kaler and Steve Ditko, the character first appeared in Captain Atom #82 (September 1966) originally published by Charlton Comics.

== Publication history ==
=== Charlton Comics ===
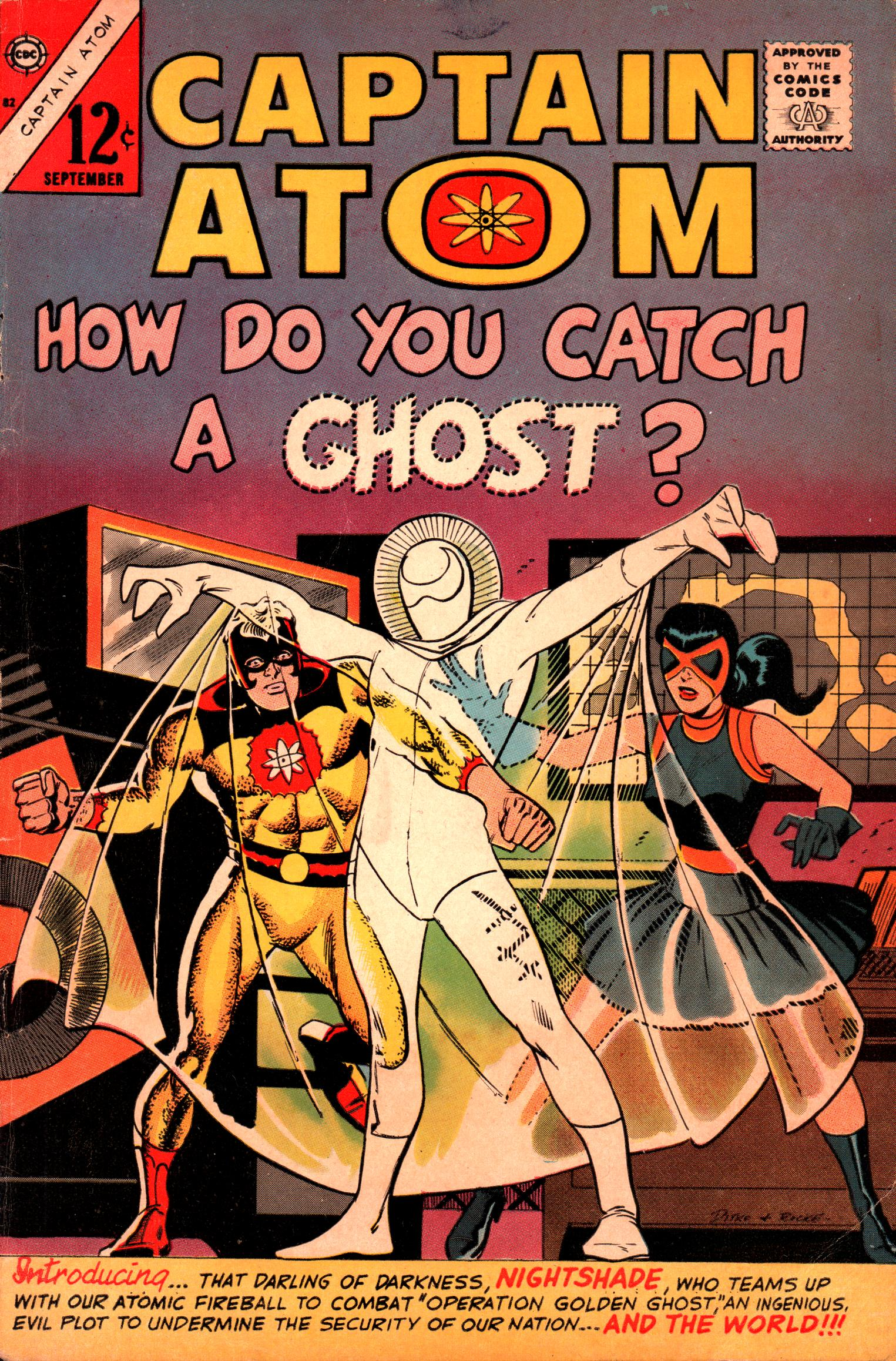
Nightshade (right) on the cover of Captain Atom #82, art by Steve Ditko.

Nightshade was first introduced in Captain Atom #82, as a partner for the titular hero. Her real name is Eve Eden and her father is a U.S. senator. She is blonde and wears a black wig as Nightshade. She was romantically involved with Captain Atom for a brief time.

She appeared several times in Captain Atom stories, before getting her own backup series in the last three published issues (#87-89). She also appeared in the last unpublished Captain Atom story that appeared in the fanzine Charlton Bullseye. In this backup series (with art by Jim Aparo), Tiger (Judomaster's now-grown-up sidekick) is her martial-arts instructor. The source of her powers is also finally described. Her mother, Magda, was actually a visitor from another dimension whose denizens have the ability to transform into living two-dimensional shadows; she passed these powers on to her son and daughter. On a visit to this dimension, Magda and her children are attacked. Mortally wounded, Magda is able to transport herself and Eve back to Earth. Eve promised to return and find her brother. This never occurs during the Charlton years.

In 1981, Nightshade would appear in issue #7 of the new Charlton Bullseye comic. Her last "Charlton" appearance would be in a story that teamed up all the Charlton "Action Heroes" as the Sentinels of Justice, and in her own one-shot by AC Comics.

=== DC Comics ===
==== Suicide Squad ====
Nightshade in Suicide Squad #17 (June 1988), art by Luke McDonnell.

Once integrated into the DC Universe in Crisis on Infinite Earths, Nightshade was revamped as a government super-spy who worked for Task Force X, also known as the Suicide Squad. Many of her adventures alongside Captain Atom during their Charlton interactions were retconned into instead being with King Faraday. While the Suicide Squad's core group was busy dealing with the events of the crossover Legends, Nightshade, along with fellow spy Nemesis, was sent overseas to infiltrate the mercenary death squad Jihad. Taking the name Chimera, Nightshade was forced to participate in the massacre of innocent civilians at an airport as Jihad sought to demonstrate their effectiveness to a potential client. This event deeply affected Nightshade, causing tension between her and Suicide Squad leader Amanda Waller. As a result of the mission with Jihad, Nightshade was removed from her position as a spy and given the job of being the handler for the mentally unstable sorceress known as the Enchantress. She also served as Waller's liaison between Task Force X and a rival government program known as Project ATOM (which brought Nightshade into contact with the superhero Captain Atom).

As the series progressed, Nightshade revealed her past to her team: her post-Crisis origin was that she was the princess of the "Land of Nightshades". Eve Eden's mother Maureen was the queen of the Land of Nightshades, and fled to Earth with her infant children to escape the demonic power of an entity known as the Incubus. Eve believed she was a normal child until her mother took her and her brother Larry into the Land of Nightshades, to show them their true heritage. This was a costly mistake. The Incubus found them, kidnapped Larry and mortally wounded Maureen. Eve's mother used her last breath to reveal to Eve her hereditary powers over darkness. Eve promised her dying mother that she would one day return to save her younger brother. The Incubus possessed Larry's body, killing him in the process, and hid within the Land of Nightshades slaughtering all remaining human inhabitants. It was revealed that when Nightshade (who post-Crisis now possessed the additional ability of teleportation) used her powers to teleport that the process required her to pass through the barren and haunted Land of Nightshades.

Waller gave Nightshade permission to take the team for her personal mission in return for her help in taking down a drug cartel overseas. It was volunteer only, but everyone currently on the team agreed to go with the exception of Captain Boomerang. Bronze Tiger had to take him out, get him drunk, and drag him along unconscious. They entered the Land of Nightshades and discovered that Larry was dead and his body was controlled by the Incubus. It was revealed that June Moone's mysterious and evil "Enchantress" persona was in truth the entity known as the "Succubus". The two entities sought to possess Larry and Eve to force the siblings to conceive a child who would be the incarnation of their demonic master. Enchantress was stripped of her powers when the Succubus left her body to possess Nightshade. The evil entity failed to realize that Nightshade's will was stronger than her brother's, and was destroyed. Nightshade absorbed the Succubus' powers. With the Succubus defeated, Nightshade watched as her teammate Deadshot shot and killed the Incubus.

==== After the Suicide Squad ====
When the Suicide Squad series came to an end, Nightshade was shown working for Sarge Steel at the CBI. She made several appearances in the Superboy and the Ravers comic and would also be part of the L.A.W. miniseries, which reunited all the Charlton Action Heroes owned by DC. During the Superman/Batman story arc "Public Enemies", Nightshade falls under the control of Gorilla Grodd and is sent to claim the billion-dollar bounty placed on Superman.

==== Day of Vengeance ====
Nightshade resurfaces as a member of the Shadowpact in the Day of Vengeance miniseries. She has been paired with Detective Chimp, resulting in some good-natured bickering. During the Infinite Crisis crossover she joined a legion of DC's magic-based characters battling the Seven Deadly Enemies of Man, but was captured by Felix Faust and eventually used by Alex Luthor to bring back Earth-4.

==== Shadowpact ====
In Shadowpact #1, Nightshade and the other Shadowpact members entered the town of Riverrock, Wyoming, which was shielded from the outside world. She met a villainous counterpart named Sister Shadow. Since then she has served with the Shadowpact battling a host of magical villains. In Shadowpact #7 it was revealed that she requires some measure of concentration to form elaborate darkness constructs, when she and her partner Ragman were attacked by the Congregation. As a result, she was unable to conjure her more elaborate darkness creatures until Blue Devil managed to get the Congregation away from her. Despite this Nightshade and her teammates found themselves blinded by the Congregation's light power and for the first time in her life she experienced darkness. With the assistance of Madame Xanadu, the Shadowpact set about restoring Nightshade's sight, although fully restoring it took several days.

She is now capable of manifesting up to three giant humanoids at once.

==== "Blackest Night" ====
During the events of the "Blackest Night" storyline, Nightshade rejoins the Suicide Squad. The team is sent to Belle Reve to kidnap Deadshot. Nightshade attacks several of Deadshot's teammates on the Secret Six, but is defeated by Black Alice after she steals Nightshade's powers and uses them to render her unconscious. After a group of Black Lanterns composed of former Suicide Squad members arrives at Belle Reve to feast on the assembled metahumans, Waller knocks Black Alice out to give Nightshade back her abilities. Her powers restored, Nightshade joins the combined Suicide Squad and Secret Six members in fighting off the Black Lanterns.

==== Rise of Eclipso ====
Some time after the events of "Blackest Night", Nightshade is once again shown to be working with Shadowpact. While in another dimension, she and Nightmaster are attacked by Eclipso and his brainwashed servant Shade. After defeating both heroes, Eclipso brings Nightshade under his mental control.

==== DC Rebirth ====
Nightshade in Deathstroke #33.

In the "Batman Vs. Deathstroke" story arc of Deathstroke, Nightshade appears as an antagonist to Deathstroke, both seeking to recover a biological weapon. Nightshade sends a living shadow to attack Deathstroke and grab the box with the weapon on a memory key after he had extracted it from an ice wall. Deathstroke assumes that Amanda Waller has something to do with this, but Nightshade responds that both he and she herself aren't with the Suicide Squad anymore but are still tangled with US intelligence operations. As she attacks with her magic, she mentions that she is an orphan and the last of her line, Homo magi and the royal house of the Land of Nightshades. She cannot transport Deathstroke to the Land of Nightshades, because the promethium in his equipment is capable of absorbing most types of energies including the Night Force. Instead, she uses her shadow-matter raven Hugin to transport Robin (Damian Wayne), who Deathstroke is working with begrudgingly, to the Land of Nightshades to force Deathstroke to open the box and give the weapon inside to her, because she cannot safely open it herself without setting off the explosives in the box. She states that the weapon is terrible and that she will destroy the weapon, even though that will go against her employer. After throwing the box to Robin, she also threatens Deathstroke that Robin might open the box and thereby set off the explosives during his insanity. Deathstroke says that they both know she will not let Robin die, but she responds that she used to know but a lot of has changed. After Deathstroke gets Robin out of this realm, he opens the box and hands over a corrupted duplicate that Robin has switched for the real one. She then flies away with the duplicate, while Robin refuses to hand over the actual weapon to Deathstroke. Later, Adeline Kane reveals to Batman, disguised as Deathstroke, that she had hired Nightshade to secure the biological weapon.

In "The Witching Hour" crossover story arc, she is seen during a Sisterhood of the Sleight Hand meeting at the Oblivion Bar where she rescues Traci Thirteen by pulling her into the shadow dimension, as Witchfire possessed by Hecate burns and thereby kills many of the people inside the bar. After escaping through the shadow dimension with Traci and Enchantress, Nightshade is seen using shadows to capture Manitou Dawn, who is also possessed by Hecate. In the finale of the arc, she is seen alongside a few other heroes as they confront and defeat Hecate, who is possessing Wonder Woman.

In Doomsday Clock, she appears alongside Blue Beetle, the Question, and Captain Atom in the Bug airship as they travel to Mars. There, they and many of Earth's other superheroes confront and fight Doctor Manhattan. In the battle, she fires blasts of shadows to him. All the superheroes are, however, defeated and incapacitated by Manhattan.

== Powers and abilities ==
Eve Eden's powers are hereditary as the only surviving member of her royal family. Nightshade can teleport herself and others by passing them through the Land of Nightshades, but it subjects them to their worst nightmares. She has the ability to transform herself into a semi-solid shadow form (it requires a great amount of concentration) or manipulate darkness. Eve is even capable of creating shadowly homunculi.

== Other versions ==
- Earth-Two: An enemy of the Golden Age Sandman (Wesley Dodds), this Nightshade had the ability to control plants. Upon his revival in the 1980s series All-Star Squadron, the character was renamed Ramulus to avoid confusion with the Eve Eden version of Nightshade and became a member of the Monster Society of Evil.
- Earth-4: In the final issue of 52, a new multiverse is created, with Nightshade appearing as an inhabitant of Earth-4. This universe is the equivalent of Earth-Four, a universe that was previously the home of the Charlton Comics characters.
- Earth-13: Shown in Countdown: Arena and known as Eve of the Shadows. Dressed in a Romani attire, she is married to the Captain Atom of her world, the Brigadier Atom. Upon avenging her namesake, and slaying The Shade, she travels the Shadowlands dimension to get back home, finding Monarch waiting for her, holding her husband by the throat. He nukes her world's version of the United States and Canada and brings Eve back badly traumatized.
- Countdown: Arena: A female version of the Shade. This version of Nightshade, a sadistic psychopath, creates horrible creatures with her powers that torn one of the other two Nightshades, until she is taken to the Shadowlands by Eve of Shadows and decapitated.
- JLA: Destiny: Nightshade appeared as a prominent character and later changed her name to Destiny after she received the ability to see in the future.
- Kingdom Come (Earth-22): Nightshade was briefly shown in flashbacks as a member of Magog's Justice Battalion, along with the rest of the Charlton 'Action Heroes'. She was apparently killed with the other members when Captain Atom was killed.
- Watchmen: The female superhero character (Silk Spectre) was originally supposed to be Nightshade. However, once the idea of using Charlton characters was abandoned, writer Alan Moore decided to take inspiration from other superheroes.

== In other media ==
=== Television ===
In an unproduced proposal for a Justice League of America animated series, Nightshade was one of several characters redesigned by Bruce Timm, though she did not appear in Justice League nor Justice League Unlimited.

=== Film ===
- Nightshade appears in Superman/Batman: Public Enemies, voiced by Rachael MacFarlane.
- Nightshade appears in DC Showcase: Blue Beetle, voiced by Ashly Burch.
- Nightshade appears in Justice League: Crisis on Infinite Earths, voiced again by Ashly Burch.
