= Enchantress (DC Comics) =

DC Comics character

- Enchantress as depicted in Suicide Squad vol. 5 #20 (August 2017). Art by Stjepan Šejić.

Publication information
- Publisher: DC Comics
- First appearance: Strange Adventures #187 (April 1966)
- Created by: Bob Haney; Howard Purcell

In-story information
- Alter ego: Dr. June Moone
- Species: Human (June Moone); Homo magi (Succubus)
- Team affiliations: Suicide Squad; Suicide Squad Black; Shadowpact; Sentinels of Magic; Forgotten Villains; Justice League
- Partnerships: Killer Croc; Sebastian Faust; Warlock's Daughter
- Notable aliases: Anita Soulfeeda; The Soulsinger
- Abilities: Mastery of black magic and spellcasting (flight, illusions, reality alteration, necromancy, etc.) via her Enchantress personality; can remotely access magical user's magic and possess innate high magical sensitivity used to track other magic users.; Vast knowledge of the arcane arts and the occult; Moderate athlete and hand-to-hand combatant

The Enchantress is a supervillain appearing in American comic books published by DC Comics. Created by Bob Haney and Howard Purcell, the character made her first appearance in Strange Adventures #187 (April 1966).

Dr. June Moone is a freelance artist who becomes possessed by an entity originally known only as the "Enchantress" (originally once known as Succubus). The resulting merge creates a powerful sorceress considered to be one of the most dangerous black magic practitioners in the DC Universe. The character has often been depicted as both a villain and antihero, establishing herself as a member of various teams such as Shadowpact, the Suicide Squad, and the Sentinels of Magic. In more recent continuities, she is often cast as an ally and adversary for the Justice League Dark and a recurring member of the Suicide Squad.

The Enchantress would make an appearance in mainstream media, portrayed by Cara Delevingne in the 2016 film Suicide Squad as both June Moone and the Enchantress, the latter portrayed as a separate entity possessing her body. The Enchantress entity would also be portrayed by Samantha Liana Cole on the show Legends of Tomorrow, which is part of the Arrowverse. Enchantress and June Moone also make an appearance in the video game Injustice 2.

== Publication history ==
The Enchantress ("The Switcheroo-Witcheroo" as she was bannered on the cover) first appeared in the nine-page lead story of Strange Adventures #187 (April 1966), the National Comics (now DC Comics) flagship science fiction anthology title. She then appeared in two eight-page appearances in the same title: Strange Adventures #191 (August 1966) and 200 (May 1967), written by Bob Haney and drawn by co-creator Howard Purcell. The first two stories were reprinted in Adventure Comics #417 (March 1972) and 419 (May 1972), her only appearances in the 1970s.

Following this, the Enchantress appeared in two linked Supergirl tales in The Superman Family #204–205 (November/December 1980–January/February 1981). Writer Jack C. Harris and artist Trevor Von Eeden proposed to DC an all-female super-team named the "Power Squad" which would have included the Enchantress, but were turned down. The character appeared in a two-part story featuring the Forgotten Villains in the Superman team-up title DC Comics Presents #77–78 (January–February 1985). She was one of the super-characters in Legends #3 (January 1987) and 6 (April 1987), followed by the origin of the Suicide Squad in Secret Origins (vol. 2) #14 (May 1987) and the immediately following Suicide Squad series issues #1–8 (May 1987–December 1987) and 12–16 (April 1988–August 1988), written by John Ostrander; and The Spectre (vol. 2) #11 (February 1988).

Eleven years later, she returned in Green Lantern (vol. 3) #118 (November 1999) and Day of Judgment #1–5 (all November 1999), written by Geoff Johns with art by Matt Smith and Steve Mitchell. She next guest-starred in another DC Comics miniseries JLA: Black Baptism #1–4 (May–August 2001) by Ruben Diaz and Sean Smith (writers) and Jesus Saiz (artist) after which the Enchantress disappeared again until the Day of Vengeance miniseries #1–5 (June 2005–November 2005) by Bill Willingham. Willingham also used her character through the first 16 issues (July 2006–October 2007) of the Shadowpact series that followed directly from Day of Vengeance. Lilah Sturges wrote the title from issue #17–25 (November 2007–July 2008). During that time she also made appearances in the major DC Comics crossover series Countdown, in issues #29 (October 17, 2007) and 28 (October 24, 2007), the associated Countdown to Mystery #1 (November 2007), and one issue of The Trials of Shazam!, #11 (March 2008).

Since the cancellation of Shadowpact, the Enchantress has continued to make minor appearances in the DC Universe, including DC Universe Holiday Special (2008), and the miniseries Reign in Hell #2–8 (September 2008–April 2009). She appeared in Action Comics #885 (March 2010), part of a new cycle of stories by James Robinson which led up to the DC Comics 2010 limited series War of the Supermen.

When DC relaunched their entire line in September 2011, it included a new team comic book titled Justice League Dark which featured the magical characters of the DCU: Shade, the Changing Man; Madame Xanadu; Deadman; Zatanna; John Constantine and Mindwarp. Their first enemy was the Enchantress gone mad.

== Fictional character biography ==
June Moone (Note: Her surname has been spelled both "Moon" and "Moone", but it was originally "Moone".) was a freelance artist who was invited to a costume party at an old castle, and stumbled upon a secret chamber where an unknown magical being (later named as Dzamor) (Note: Post-Crisis called "Dhazmor" in a flashback sequence – "Devil to Pay" in Suicide Squad #15 (July 1988).) empowered her to fight an evil presence in the castle. Saying the words "The Enchantress", her appearance changes from the blonde-haired June to the black-haired and costumed Enchantress and defeats a minotaur creature from a tapestry. Soon after, she defeats a monster at Cape Kennedy and a mirage of a demonic creature manipulated by a crook.

In her next appearance, however, the Enchantress is a misguided character fighting Supergirl, who prevents her gaining omnipotent magical power and cancelling all other superpowers on Earth, twice. (Note: After the Crisis on Infinite Earths crossover event, this was retconned to have been Power Girl instead of Supergirl, as Supergirl had been removed from DC continuity.) Her villainous side takes over after this, and the Enchantress then continues her career as a member of the Forgotten Villains and part of the army of supervillains during the Crisis on Infinite Earths crossover event.

=== Suicide Squad ===
She is next recruited into the newly formed 'Task Force X', soon to be known as the 'Suicide Squad', on the chance that she could keep her villainous side in check. In her first mission, she uses massive magical energy to defeat Brimstone, which sends her over the edge and she becomes temporarily truly villainous. During her tenure with the Suicide Squad, June Moone's control over her Enchantress side becomes weaker, and she destroys at least one mission because of this; teammate Deadshot is tasked with taking her out should she get beyond control. Eventually, Madame Xanadu diagnoses that June's loss of control is because she began using her powers before she could control them, and the only way to counteract this is not to use them until her aura, which protects her from the evil influences in magic, regains its power.

Madame Xanadu gives June a necklace that she cannot remove which, together with a ring to be held by someone else, creates a feedback loop preventing the Enchantress from using magic for evil as a temporary measure. She also raises an army to destroy the town and perform terror attacks as stated in the first mission. June then discovers that her Enchantress persona is, in fact, a separate evil entity from another dimension fused with her, not simply a manifestation of magic. She learned this when she and other Squad members joined Nightshade on a mission to free her homeland, the Nightshade Dimension. There, she found out that the Incubus, who took over that dimension, is the brother of the Succbus, who merges with her to give her the power of the Enchantress. The Incubus rips his sister out of June, leaving her powerless. Shortly afterwards, June disappears from the Suicide Squad for unknown reasons.

=== Day of Judgment ===
Eleven years later, after a storm caused by war in Hell, June breaks free from the Ostrander Mental Institute in New Jersey, (Note: A reference to Suicide Squad writer John Ostrander.) where she has been for an indeterminate period of time. (Note: Which presents some continuity issues: according to the "Day of Judgment Timeline" – a text piece in Day of Judgment: Secret Files and Origins #1 (1999) - June Moone/the Enchantress was left imprisoned in the Nightshade Dimension three years prior, which contradicts accepted DC history for the Suicide Squad. The piece also explains her appearance on Earth in Day of Judgment as "she is later freed under mysterious and unrevealed circumstances".) Refusing to join with the superheroes fighting a demon invasion on Earth and in Hell, the newly freed Enchantress is possessed by Deadman to manipulate her into helping the fight in Hell. Once there, June's Enchantress persona is murdered by Sebastian Faust as a purely evil act, the only way to reignite the fires of Hell.

=== JLA: Black Baptism ===
June Moone is left in a semi-catatonic state after the removal of her Enchantress persona and is committed to 'Elysium Fields Sanitarium' outside Detroit. Faust removes her from the sanitarium and reunites her with her Enchantress persona – who had not been killed by him and has been masquerading as 'Anita Souleata', a succubus working with a group of Mafia-styled demons to create a gateway to Hell and resurrect Hermes Trismegestus, a mad sorcerer who wanted to destroy life on Earth. When June and the Enchantress are re-combined, a new entity called the Soulsinger is temporarily created, which fades away shortly after, leaving the Enchantress behind – once again a separate entity, but cut off from her powers. June Moone is taken to be looked after by Doctor Occult.

=== Day of Vengeance ===
Ragman digs the Enchantress out from under a destroyed forest after the Spectre, bent on killing all magical beings and places on Earth, kills nearly 700 sorcerers, only breaking off when attacked. The Enchantress divines the seduction of the Spectre by Eclipso/Jean Loring, mentally from the safety of the pocket-dimensional Oblivion Bar, where many magical entities have gone to escape him. She then leaves to challenge the Spectre on Earth, having first created a gun that can kill her should she turn evil again and offering it to Ragman. When she overloads again while channeling power from nearly everyone on Earth with magic capabilities to Captain Marvel so that he can defeat the Spectre, she is put out of action by a punch from Blue Devil instead. Recovering quickly enough to devise a plan to lure the Spectre into a trap, the Enchantress helps with the reconstruction of the Rock of Eternity in Gotham City, after facing Doctor Occult, who has been possessed by the spirit of Envy. During the Day of Vengeance series, Enchantress, Ragman, Blue Devil, and a number of other magical entities form the "Shadowpact" super-team.

=== Shadowpact ===
The Shadowpact are summoned by the Phantom Stranger when the town of Riverrock, Wyoming is entrapped in a giant bubble of blood and endangered by "the Pentacle", a team of supervillains, whose goal is to sacrifice the townspeople to summon the Sun King, an ancient rogue god from another dimension. Thirty-seven people perish before the Shadowpact manage to defeat them; the Enchantress is able to tap into the magical powers of Strega, one of the Pentacle and destroy the bubble from within. She incapacitates or possibly kills one of the Pentacle, the White Rabbit, after he leaves them and frees the Shadowpact, considering him too unpredictable to work with. Due to unexpected side effects of the magic spells needed to defeat the villains, the outside world believe that the Shadowpact has been dead for a year and they are honored with a team statue set in a park in Metropolis.

The Enchantress then helps the Ragman defeat an assassin sent to kill him, in the course of which they are attacked by the Wild Hunt of legend and temporarily transformed into mystical hellhounds. Shortly after, she helps heal Nightmaster after he is stabbed during a fight with Etrigan the Demon. After the Shadowpact are seconded to Checkmate to infiltrate Kobra's organization, she then helps foil Doctor Gotham's plan to destroy Chicago by entering his inter-dimensional cloak and destroying the artifacts contained within. She takes an apprentice, Laura Fell, the Warlock's Daughter before they both unwittingly almost allow a race of mindless creatures called "the Unbound" to reach Earth while creating a portal to the Land of Nightshades, where Nightmaster, Nightshade and Ragman are trapped. She frees her colleagues and the inhabitants of the Nightshades Dimension by creating a magical virus to combat the mage-created virus that created the Unbound – mixing a possessed creatures' soul with the essence of Nightmaster's virtues. When Nightmaster decides to stay in the Nightshade Dimension, Enchantress kisses him. (Note: A minor theme from earlier is that the Enchantress hates men. On one occasion the Ragman kisses her and she recoils (Day of Vengeance #1), and the same happens with Blue Devil (Day of Vengeance #3). It is later hinted that she may have been abused, although this may have been a demonic-induced torture. This vignette could be an indication that her feelings may have simply been altered by the removal of the evil Enchantress persona.) On returning to Earth, she participates in the final battle against the Sun King.

The Shadowpact, including the Enchantress, helped Captain Atom return to Mirabai's dimension – where Sam Lane has moved the main base of his secret anti-Kryptonian 'Project 7734'.

=== The New 52 ===
In 2011, DC Comics cancelled all their titles and relaunched 52 new comics as part of The New 52. One of these was Justice League Dark, which features a number of supernatural-themed heroes including Shade, the Changing Man, Zatanna, John Constantine, and Madame Xanadu coming together to fight an insane Enchantress, who has become separated from June Moone. During the crisis, the Enchantress' powers begin randomly appearing across the world, causing chaos: the Sphinx comes to life and attacks tourists and hundreds of duplicates of June Moone appear to search for the original. While the Justice League tries to intervene, the Enchantress manifests as a colossal monster made up of the bodies of hundreds of June Moones and defeats Superman, Wonder Woman and Cyborg with ease. John Constantine deduces that Madame Xanadu said an incantation that separated June from the Enchantress and reads an incantation that reverses the spell, reuniting the Enchantress and June.

=== DC Rebirth ===
During DC Rebirth, the Enchantress serves as a member of the Suicide Squad again and during the "Black Vault" story arc, they retrieve an alien item that serves as a portal to the Phantom Zone. However, once they bring it back to Belle Reve Penitentiary, it causes all the inmates to go into a killing frenzy except Harley Quinn, Amanda Waller, Killer Croc and Rick Flag. June Moone lets the Enchantress out, who also remains unaffected due to being a magical entity. She manages to get Harley Quinn to the Vault but is incapacitated by General Zod when he sucks the air out of her lungs.

In one of the later issues, Waller calls Moone to help a military general whose house had been possessed by a demon. She turns into the Enchantress, but she ends up scheming with the demon to escape Waller and destroy the world. She turns back to June to have the demon remove the bomb device and set the Enchantress free, but the demon attacks her and frightens her. June, in retaliation, unleashes magic and banishes the demon without turning into the Enchantress.

In the Justice League vs. Suicide Squad storyline, the Enchantress is sent with the Suicide Squad to stop a cult from sinking an island as a sacrifice to their god. The Justice League arrives and clashes with the Suicide Squad and she defeats Superman with ease once she realizes he is vulnerable to magic. When Maxwell Lord breaks into Belle Reve Penitentiary along with Rustam, Lobo, Doctor Polaris, the Emerald Empress and Johnny Sorrow, the original Suicide Squad, she threatens Lord only to be quickly overwhelmed by his telepathic powers.

== Characterization ==
Early iterations of the character first suggested the Enchantress persona being a split personality while later stories and depictions clarified and re-conceptualized the Enchantress entity to be a genuine magical being inhabiting June as her host.

=== Enchantress ===
As a sorceress and magical being, the Enchantress is considered one of the most dangerous magical practitioners and mystical threats to the superhero community (i.e. Justice League, Teen Titans, etc.), comparable in power to other black magic practitioners such as Sebastian Faust, Tannarak, the Wizard, possess magical strength exceeding Zatanna, and can contend with powerful heroes such as Superman in direct conflict. Contrasting to June Moone, the Enchantress is characterized as a demonic-like force having a lust for power overtime despite initially using her powers for good.

=== June Moone ===
Often depicted as being mild-mannered and desiring to be a superhero upon gaining powers as Enchantress, June becomes a victim to the Enchantress and her parasitic whims and lust for power.

==== Love interests ====
Despite having been characterized as having some disdain for men, June has formulated romances with male love interests: In comics, June's first love interest in publication was Alan Dell, who was attracted to the Enchantress persona not knowing that the Enchantress was also June herself. Sebastian Faust was also a love interest, interested in June but sacrifices Enchantress due to a complex situation requiring an act of evil to reignite the flames of Hell in a bid to prevent Asmodeus from usurping power of the Spectre, splitting the pair. A guilt-ridden Faust seeks to restore her but upon her and Enchantress reuniting, he distances himself from her. Ragman was also romantically interested although she vehemently rejected his advances. In newer continuities, Killer Croc also has dated Enchantress, the two of them subtly connected romantically by Amanda Waller as a mean of control, who then uses his life as leverage on June. In media, June's most prominent love interest is Rick Flag Jr. in the DC Extended Universe, the former chosen by Amanda Waller deliberately so the two of them would form a close bond and become lovers, allowing her to have leverage over the two.

== Powers and abilities ==
=== Enchantress ===
Enchantress possess a plethora of abilities granted to her by magic, such as flight, the ability to phase through solid objects, object transformation, and shapeshifting. In more recent depictions, the Enchantress also possesses reality-warping abilities and is remarked to possess virtually limitless power. Enchantress also exhibits a unique sensitivity to magic which enables her to establish connections with other magical entities. For instance, she linked to the essence of Eclipso, conveying his thoughts to her companions. She has also demonstrated the ability to track the Spectre through mystical means and remotely accessed the powers of other magic users, including channeling the combined magical energy of numerous beings to assist Captain Marvel in battling the Spectre.

Additionally, she possesses several arcane items, including the Nightwitch's "Herne-Ramsgate Cauldron," which aids her in locating various magical creatures throughout the DC Universe. Her magical hat is known to conceal various tricks and enchantments.

=== June Moone ===
While June was an ordinary human with no metahuman powers, she is remarked to possess average athletic, hand-to-hand combat skills, and is a capable artist. She is later seen capable of tapping into the Enchantress' magic while retaining her agency, making her a capable sorceress. She is also knowledgeable in different branches of science to better understand and manipulate the world around her with her magical powers. These include: physics, mechanics, biological anthropology, geology, anatomy, astrobiology, and cryptozoology.

== Other versions ==
An alternate universe version of Enchantress appears in Flashpoint. This version is a spy for the Amazons working undercover within the Secret Seven before she is killed by Superman.

== In other media ==
=== Television ===
- The Enchantress appears in the Legends of Tomorrow episode "The Great British Fake Off", portrayed by Samantha Liana Cole. This version is an immortal magic-user with a previous history involving John Constantine. In Ancient Egypt, the Fate Clotho visits Enchantress to solicit her help in hiding a piece of the Loom of Fate. In 1910 England, Enchantress hides the fragment in a boarding house and disguises herself as its elderly keeper, Mrs. Hughes (portrayed by Marion Eisman). Constantine and Zari Tomaz of the titular Legends and a group of evil historical figures appear at the boarding house in search of the fragment, though the Legends claim it first and kill the latter. Before they leave, Constantine alludes to Mrs. Hughes' true identity while Enchantress secretly hints at seeing him again.
- June Moone and the Enchantress appear in the DC Super Hero Girls (2019) episode "#OneEnchantedEvening", voiced by Ashley Spillers and Kari Wahlgren, respectively. The former is an art teacher at Metropolis High School.
- The Enchantress appears in Harley Quinn, voiced initially by Leila Birch and by Katie Rich in the fifth season. This version is a member of the Suicide Squad's "A-team" who later enters a relationship with squad-mate Killer Croc.
- June Moone and the Enchantress appear in Suicide Squad Isekai, both voiced by Shizuka Itō in Japanese and Christina Kelly in English. After joining the Suicide Squad and traveling to another world, the Undead King takes Moone hostage, forcing the Enchantress to join her rogue squad-mates in furthering the former's goals until she receives help from Rick Flag and Clayface in rescuing Moone.

=== Film ===
The Enchantress as portrayed by Cara Delevingne in Suicide Squad.

- The Flashpoint incarnation of the Enchantress makes a non-speaking cameo appearance in Justice League: The Flashpoint Paradox.
- June Moone and the Enchantress appear in Suicide Squad, both portrayed by Cara Delevingne. The former is an archaeologist who becomes possessed by the latter while exploring an ancient temple and opening a totem containing the Enchantress' spirit, though the spirit is unable to take full control unless Moone says her name. After securing her heart, Amanda Waller selects the Enchantress and Rick Flag, who entered a relationship with Moone, for the Task Force X program. However, the Enchantress secretly steals back her heart and goes rogue to free her brother, Incubus. Together, they attempt to build a superweapon to conquer Earth, but Task Force X kill Incubus and the Enchantress, freeing Moone.

=== Video games ===
- The Enchantress appears as a character summon in Scribblenauts Unmasked: A DC Comics Adventure.
- The Enchantress appears as an assist character in DC Legends.
- June Moone and the Enchantress appear as downloadable playable characters in Injustice 2, both voiced by Brandy Kopp.
- The Enchantress appears as a playable character in DC Unchained.
- The Enchantress appears as a playable character in Lego DC Super-Villains.

=== Miscellaneous ===
- June Moone appears in DC Super Hero Girls (2015), voiced by April Stewart. This version is an art teacher at Super Hero High.
- June Moone and the Enchantress appear in the Suicide Squad novelization, in which it is revealed the latter once ruled alongside Incubus as Incan deities, being likened to Mama Killa and Inti respectively.
