= Deadman (character) =

Comic book superhero

- Deadman as depicted on the cover of Deadman 1# (1985). Art by Neal Adams.

Publication information
- Publisher: DC Comics
- First appearance: Strange Adventures #205 (October 1967)
- Created by: Arnold Drake (writer); Carmine Infantino (artist)

In-story information
- Alter ego: Boston J. Brand
- Species: Ghost
- Team affiliations: Justice League Dark; Seven Soldiers of Victory; Sentinels of Magic; Justice League
- Abilities: Flight; Invisibility; Intangibility; Possession; Expertise in acrobatics, unarmed combat, and occultism

Deadman is a superhero appearing in American comic books published by DC Comics. Created by scripter Arnold Drake and artist Carmine Infantino, the character made his debut in Strange Adventures #205 (1967). He has been a frequent supporting character in several comic titles since the 1970s, as well as an occasional protagonist in numerous limited series. In his supporting roles, he frequently serves as a member of superhero teams like the Justice League Dark and acts as a recurring, unseen agent for Batman.

Deadman is the superhero persona of Boston Brand, an aerialist who performed at a circus until he was murdered in the middle of his act by an assassin with a hook prosthetic hand. His spirit was then reincarnated by the deity Rama Kushna so that he could take revenge on his killer. As a spirit, he is invisible to the mortal eye and has the abilities of flight, intangibility, and the possession of human bodies. Additionally, he has training in unarmed combat, acrobatics, and also practices in occultism.

Deadman has been adapted into a variety of other media, including television, film, and video games.

== Publication history ==
=== Creation ===
Arnold Drake spoke on the development of Deadman and revealed the 1966 original concept sketch of the character, which was initially a muscular skeleton. Drake further stated, "They were looking for something to bolster a magazine that was about to die, and I came up with Deadman, and they were going to turn it down, [but] then they bought the idea, but decided to turn down the title, because they were afraid, that the board would not permit them to title [the comic Deadman], because of the Comics Code of Authority, so I said you fight for that, it's a good title, they did and Deadman succeeded.

Drake later recalled in an interview, "So here I was in the middle of a Zen-Buddhist movement and I thought, 'Maybe I can use that for my main character.'"

=== Publication appearances ===
Strange Adventures #205 (October 1967), the debut of Deadman. Cover art by Carmine Infantino.

Deadman's first appearance in Strange Adventures #205, written by Arnold Drake and drawn by Carmine Infantino, included the first known depiction of narcotics in a story approved by the Comics Code Authority. The series is most associated with the art and writing of Neal Adams and the writing of Jack Miller, who took over from Infantino and Drake after the first story. The first story and all of the Adams stories were reprinted in 1985 as a seven-issue series.

Although he appeared occasionally in the 1970s and 1980s as a supporting character in various comics, including Jack Kirby's Forever People, Deadman did not get his own series again until 1986, in a four-issue limited series written by Andrew Helfer and drawn by José Luis García-López, which picked up the story where Adams left off. Deadman's next major storyline was in Action Comics Weekly, in 1988–1989. After this, he starred in the two-issue series Deadman: Love After Death, drawn by Kelley Jones and written by Mike Baron. This was followed by the limited series Deadman: Exorcism in 1992, also written by Mike Baron and drawn by Kelley Jones. Jones' gaunt, zombie-like rendition of the character would later appear in the pages of Batman. There was a Deadman ongoing series in 2002, which lasted nine issues, as well as a couple of standalone issues. His cameo appearances also continued, including several issues of Alan Moore's run on Swamp Thing, and Neil Gaiman's The Books of Magic. He had a cameo in books two and three of Batman: Gotham County Line, which was released in November 2005. In 2009, Deadman was a featured title in the Wednesday Comics.

The character and self-titled series have won several awards, including the 1967 Alley Award for Best New Strip (by Arnold Drake and Carmine Infantino in Strange Adventures), and the 1968 Alley Award Hall of Fame (for Neal Adams). DC Comics published a slipcased hardcover edition collecting the original Deadman stories in December 2001. Deadman's retconned origin is revealed in Brightest Day #14 (2010), written by Geoff Johns and Peter Tomasi. Deadman had a three-part miniseries called Deadman: Dark Mansion of Forbidden Love written by Sarah Vaughn with art by Lan Medina.

In 2026 a new comic series started.

== Fictional character biography ==
Circus trapeze artist Boston Brand performs under the name Deadman, a stage persona that includes a red costume and white corpse makeup. When Brand is murdered during a trapeze performance by a mysterious assailant known only as the Hook, his spirit is given the power to possess any living being by the Hindu god Rama Kushna to search for his murderer and obtain justice. It is established in Green Arrow (vol. 4) #4 that Deadman believes Rama is the supreme being of the universe.

At the end of the Neal Adams story line, Deadman seems to discover the truth behind his murder and the ultimate fate of Hook, who killed him as part of an initiation into a society of contract killers. However, the real Hook is one among many one-handed men who work for an organization known as "The Scavengers". This group steals advanced technology for a profit. Fighting the Scavengers also led to Deadman gaining an artificial body from the Forever People. This group had rented rooms from Trixie Magruder, an old circus companion of Deadman.

=== Various missions ===
Rama Kushna also maintained a city for some time, called Nanda Parbat, where she rehabilitated criminals with her power. One of the worst was Darius Caldera, who almost destroyed the world when he left the city. Nanda Parbat later fell due to a combined military and mystical force. All the evil people are now back in the real world, still a danger. Brand's twin brother, Cleveland, is killed while possessed by Boston, while he's performing Boston's circus act. The killer was out to kill Boston Brand. Rama also dies to defeat Jonah, a spirit similar to Deadman. Around this time, Deadman assists the Spectre in battling a demon before being forced to fuse with him after the demon injures him.

Later, Deadman receives a birthday present from his diminutive friend, Max Loomis. Max places himself in a trance to "meet" Deadman and the two take a pleasant journey down "memory lane", mainly Deadman's more pleasant memories of Nanda Parbat. Soon after, Loomis meets with old circus friends and Deadman involves himself in a case of suspected murder. Deadman wants to go after the escapees of Nanda Parbat, but Max thinks pursuing the murder is a better course. Over several years, a mysterious stranger has Deadman travel through time to try to save the souls of deceased heroes from Caldera. Due to the mental influence of various forces, Deadman is unable to use the knowledge of the timestream to benefit humanity. With the assistance of the spirits of the deceased heroes, Deadman defeats Caldera and the powers behind him. Max Loomis provides vital help on the material plane. After that, Boston and Loomis decide to hunt down the other Parbat escapees.

=== Youth and Hell ===
In the Sins of Youth incident, Deadman is one of the dozens of heroes reduced to a preteen age by Klarion the Witch Boy and an alien machine owned by Doiby Dickles. He assists Secret in confronting Teekl, Klarion's cat familiar, in an effort to restore everyone. He also joins in the fight against mystically created and mystically altered villains. During Day of Judgment, Boston Brand travels with a group of heroes to the frozen wastelands of Hell. Their goal is to restart the demonic fires, thus recalling all the demons from the earthly plane. An accident strands Brand and the others under the frozen waters of the River Styx, forcing them to live out what would be, to them, Hell. For Brand, it is that the sharpshooter hits him in the shoulder, thus he survives. Brand feels he needs to die to learn "how to live". His battles against the demons would come back to haunt him. In the four-part Black Baptism miniseries, Deadman and several other "Sentinels of Magic", the magical group formed after the Day of Judgment incident, are hunted by the Diablos. Partly fueled by revenge, they subdue many of the Sentinels and drain their magic. The JLA eventually rescue them all and destroy all the Diablos.

=== Blackest Night ===
Boston Brand begins to hear the voices of the dead and his own remains calling for him to protect them. Being a spirit, he is unable to stop his body from being raised as a Black Lantern. He attempts to possess his own body but is ejected after experiencing extreme pain during the attempt. He assists Batman, Robin, and Red Robin in repelling the Black Lantern invasion. Deadman manages to save Commissioner Gordon from the Black Lanterns by possessing the body of his daughter, spiriting them both to safety.

Deadman is later sent by Batman to possess Jason Blood, invoking the power of Etrigan. Deadman uses Etrigan's demon flame to hold back the Black Lanterns, but struggles to maintain control of his body and is forced out. Deadman then frees Batman and Red Robin, who had frozen themselves to escape the Black Lanterns' onslaught. He is later seen inside the Black Lantern Damage's ring, apparently having followed Jean Loring, Mera and the Atom when they shrank down to enter it. He frees Mera and the Atom from Loring by briefly possessing her, allowing them to return to normal size. During this incident, he says he believes possessing the Black Lanterns causes him damage. He is later seen at Nanda Parbat, attempting to stop the Black Lanterns attempting to pass through the spiritual barrier by taking over their bodies and ripping them apart. He briefly loses himself to a Black Lantern's personality, but is saved by the Phantom Stranger. The Stranger convinces Deadman to enter his body again, telling them it is his destiny to bring it within Nanda Parbat. With the Stranger's help, Deadman forces the black ring off his body, bringing it through the gate of Nanda Parbat. The body, which the Stranger states is of "singular importance", is placed under the gatekeeper and Blue Devil's protection, and Deadman heads out, intent on sharing the information he gleaned while inside the Black Lanterns with Hal Jordan. In the aftermath of the final battle, Deadman is restored to life by a White Lantern ring.

=== Brightest Day ===
In the 2010–11 miniseries Brightest Day, Deadman discovers that his white ring can resurrect others. He begins to acclimate to living again, including exercising self-preservational habits, but expresses reservations about being alive again. As he attempts to learn what his mission on Earth is, he teams up with Hawk and Dove. Deadman learns that he will cross paths with the person the Entities chose to guard the Earth. The Entity also instructs Deadman to embrace life and those around him, as he led a selfish life in his previous one, realizing the value of others only after he died. In learning to appreciate his new life, Deadman realizes that he and Dove have fallen in love, and reconnects with his grandfather.

The Entity also tells Deadman that when Nekron attacked Earth, he created a "dark avatar" who will try to destroy the Star City forest and Earth's soul. The Entity reveals that Earth's savior is Alec Holland, and the "dark avatar" is a corrupted Swamp Thing. After Captain Boomerang accidentally kills Deadman, he gives his power ring to Holland, transforming him into a new Swamp Thing who kills the original.

=== The New 52 ===
In The New 52 continuity reboot, Deadman's origins are reimagined in the initial run of the anthology series DC Universe Presents. After living a selfish life as Boston Brand, he is forced to possess people as Deadman following his assassination to solve their problems and avoid being sent to Hell. He also features as a member of the supernatural team, Justice League Dark. Deadman uses his possession talents to help take down various supernatural threats, such as Doctor Mist and Felix Faust. Despite their earlier claim, he and Dove try to rekindle their love. However, their attempt fails as Deadman insists on carrying on their relationship forward using borrowed bodies, while Dove shows disdain and repulsion to the idea. Furthermore, by helping out June Moone, they both gain the enmity of a crazed Enchantress.

=== DC Rebirth ===
As part of the DC Rebirth relaunch, a three-part miniseries, Deadman: Dark Mansion of Forbidden Love was released in October 2016. The story featured the creative team of writer Sarah Vaughn and artist Lan Medina. Deadman also appears in the Trinity book, focused on Batman, Superman, and Wonder Woman, along with Justice League Dark teammates Zatanna and John Constantine.

=== Dawn of DC ===
In The New Golden Age, Deadman helps Doctor Fate and Detective Chimp fight Per Degaton and investigate Hauhet, the new guiding force behind the Helmet of Fate.

Deadman is a central character in the Knight Terrors event, where he helps battle the nightmare-controlling villain Insomnia. He sacrifices himself to defeat Insomnia, but is resurrected by Rama Kushna.

== Powers and abilities ==
As a disembodied spirit, Deadman can fly, become intangible, and possess others. As a White Lantern, he is able to teleport, heal others, and create energy constructs.

== Other versions ==
- A skeletal, alternate universe version of Deadman appears in Kingdom Come.
- An alternate universe version of Deadman appears in The Books of Magic.
- Deadman makes a minor appearance in Bizarro World.
- An alternate universe version of Deadman appears in Superman & Batman: Generations II.
- An alternate universe version of Deadman appears in Superman/Batman.
- An alternate universe version of Deadman appears in Flashpoint. This version is a performer at Haly's Circus who is killed in an Amazon attack and becomes a guardian to Dick Grayson.

== In other media ==
=== Television ===
- Following the success of X-Men (2000), Warner Bros. Television announced that a Deadman television film for TNT was in development, which was also being considered as a pilot for a potential television series. The project was in development until 2003, but was later shelved.
- Deadman appears in the Justice League Unlimited episode "Dead Reckoning", voiced by Raphael Sbarge. This version previously worked with Batman to solve his murder before coming to reside in a temple at Nanda Parbat.
- Deadman appears in Batman: The Brave and the Bold, voiced by Michael Rosenbaum. This version is a former performer at Haly's Circus with no explicit connection to Rama Kushna. Additionally, he suffers from melancholic self-pity over not knowing how or why he is unable to "cross over" until he joins forces with Batman, Green Arrow, and Speedy to defeat Gentleman Ghost and becomes a hero. Afterward, he is offered the chance to ascend to the afterlife, but refuses.
- In 2011, WBTV hired Supernatural creator Eric Kripke to helm a Deadman television series for The CW, as the network was looking to commission a new superhero series. However, the series never materialized and Kripke has since moved on to other projects.
- Deadman appears in Teen Titans Go!, voiced by John DiMaggio.
- Deadman appears in a self-titled segment of DC Nation Shorts, voiced by Matt L. Jones.

=== Film ===
- Guillermo del Toro has taken an interest in producing a film about Deadman, with Variety reporting that Nikolaj Arcel was set to direct.
- Deadman appears in Justice League Dark, voiced by Nicholas Turturro. This version is a founding member of the eponymous team and a friend of Black Orchid.
- Deadman appears in Teen Titans Go! To the Movies.
- The Dick Grayson incarnation of Deadman, dubbed "Deadwing", appears in Injustice, voiced by Derek Phillips.

=== Video games ===
- Deadman appears as a character summon in Scribblenauts Unmasked: A DC Comics Adventure.
- Deadman makes a non-speaking cameo appearance in Raiden's ending for Injustice 2 as a founding member of Justice League Dark.
- Deadman appears as a playable character in Lego DC Super-Villains, voiced by Steve Blum. He is available as part of the "Justice League Dark DLC Character Pack".

=== Miscellaneous ===
- Boston Brand / Deadman appears in The Batman Adventures as a performer for Haly's Circus and the champion of a male Rama Kushna.
- Boston Brand appears in Batman and Robin Adventures #15 as a performer for Haly's Circus who took over for the Flying Graysons.
- Boston Brand / Deadman appears in Batman: Gotham Adventures #6.
- Boston Brand / Deadman appears in the Justice League Unlimited tie-in comic.
- Boston Brand / Deadman appears in Batman Beyond Unlimited #16 as a member of the New Terrific Trio.
- Boston Brand / Deadman appears in the Injustice: Gods Among Us prequel comic. After being mortally wounded by Mister Mxyzptlk disguised as the Spectre, Brand gives his powers to the recently deceased Dick Grayson before moving on to the afterlife.
- Boston Brand / Deadman appears in Batman: The Adventures Continue.

== Collected editions ==
Title	Material collected	Page Count	Year	ISBN
The Deadman Collection	Strange Adventures #205–216; The Brave and the Bold #79, 86, 104; Aquaman #50–52; Challengers of the Unknown #74	342	2001	978-1563898495
Deadman Book One	Strange Adventures #205–213	176	2011	978-1401231163
Deadman Book Two	The Brave and the Bold #79 and 86; Strange Adventures #214–216; Aquaman #50–52; Challengers of the Unknown #74	168	2012	978-1401233884
Deadman Book Three	The Phantom Stranger (vol. 2) #33, 39–41; The Brave and the Bold #133; Superman Family #183; World's Finest #223, 227; DC Super-Stars #18	176	2012	978-1401237288
Deadman Book Four	DC Special Series #8; Adventure Comics #459–466; DC Comics Presents #24	168	2014	978-1401243241
Deadman Book Five	Deadman (vol.2) #1–4; Secret Origins #15; Challengers of the Unknown #85–87	176	2014	978-1401246112
Deadman: Lost Souls	Deadman: Love After Death #1–2; Deadman: Exorcism #1–2	200	1995	978–1563891885
Deadman by Kelley Jones: The Complete Collection	Action Comics Weekly #618–626, Deadman: Love After Death #1–2; Deadman: Exorcism #1–2	272	2017	978-1401271671
Batman/Deadman: Death and Glory	Original Graphic Novel	92	1996	978-1563892288
Deadman: Deadman Walking	Deadman (vol. 4) #1-5	128	2007	978-1401212360
DC Universe Presents Vol. 1 featuring Deadman & Challengers of the Unknown	DC Universe Presents #1-8	192	2012	978-1401237165
Deadman: Dark Mansion of Forbidden Love	Deadman: Dark Mansion of Forbidden Love #1-3	160	2017	978-1401268411
Deadman	Deadman (vol. 5) #1-6	160	2018	978-1401281410
Deadman Omnibus	Strange Adventures #205-216; The Brave and the Bold #79, 86, 104, 133; Aquaman #50-52; Challengers of the Unknown #74, 84–87; Justice League of America #94, World’s Finest Comics #223, 227; The Phantom Stranger (vol. 2) #33, 39–41; Superman Family #183; DC Super Stars #18; DC Special Series #8; Adventure Comics #459-466; DC Comics Presents #24; Detective Comics #500; Deadman (vol. 2) #1-4; Secret Origins #15; covers from Deadman #1-7	944	2020	978-1779504883
