= Sebastian Faust =

- Sebastian Faust, art by Karl Story, Scott Kolins, Robin Riggs.

Publication information
- Publisher: DC Comics
- First appearance: Outsiders (vol. 2) #1 Alpha (November 1993)
- Created by: Mike Barr and Paul Pelletier

In-story information
- Alter ego: Sebastian Faust
- Species: Homo magi
- Team affiliations: Checkmate; The Outsiders; Sentinels of Magic; A.R.G.U.S. Cerebus
- Partnerships: Blue Devil
- Notable aliases: Faust; Rook Gamma
- Abilities: Mastery in magic; magical powers derived through a demonic bargain, making him a master at black magic, soul magic (manipulate souls and siphon the powers of other beings via tactile touch), and logomancy (invocation of supernatural effects by speaking backwards.); Extensive knowledge of the occult, skilled paranormal investigator, proficient in espionage and manipulation, and skilled in hand-to-hand combat.

Sebastian Faust, commonly known as Faust, is a fictional character appearing in American comic books published by DC Comics. Created by Mike Barr and Paul Pelletier, he first appeared in Outsiders (vol. 2) #1: Alpha (November, 1993). Having been portrayed as both a superhero and tragic villain, the character is the son of mystic supervillain Felix Faust, whose surname is inspired by protagonist of the eponymous German legend.

The eldest son of Felix Faust, Sebastian gained his powers when his soul was sold by his father in a Faustian bargain with demon lord Nebiros to regain his mystical powers. Trained by his abusive father in the mystic arts, he eventually runs away to escape his influence. In his adulthood, he emerges as a mystic superhero and paranormal investigator often partnered with Blue Devil. Due to his callous methods, powers in black magic, and parentage, he garners a controversial reputation within the superhero community in the DC Universe. Following DC Rebirth, he is reinvented as an anti-villain and former spymaster of A.R.G.U.S.'s mystic branch who comes to conflict with Amanda Waller, culminating to her founding a mystical derived of her team, the Suicide Squad Black.

== Publication history ==
Sebastian Faust was first introduced in the Outsiders (Vol. 2) No. 1 Alpha in November 1993. Serving as the mystical member of the Outsiders team, he also guest starred alongside his teammates in Action Comics and Deathstroke the Terminator series. After the series' end in 1995, Sebastian made occasional appearances in other comics such as Superboy and the Ravers but later had a larger role in the 1999 Day of Judgement crossover; he would initially appear with a revised history and detailing involving the Enchantress in the DCU Villains Secret File and Origins comic released ahead of the event depicting him as a villain. In the actual crossover event, however, much of the details was changed though he still held a significance with Enchantress and was among the characters within the Sentinels of Magic team.

Faust would later star in the 2001 JLA: Black Baptism storyline as one of the main characters, his origin from the Outsiders run revised as well as the nature of his powers. Although the character was unused for a few years afterward, he would reappear in the 2006 Checkmate series, depicting under the new designated name of "Rook Gamma" as an elite operative & mystic consultant of the fictional intelligence agency, Checkmate. Sebastian would also have a supporting role in other crossovers, including the Brightest Day crossover, appearing in the Justice League of America and Justice Society of America series though seemingly no longer a member of Checkmate.

In 2016, the DC Rebirth event relaunched DC Comics' entire line of comic book titles. A rebooted version of Sebastian Faust debuted in the backdrop story of Suicide Squad: Black Files with a new origin, connections to the fictional agency, A.R.G.U.S., and characterization as an eco-terrorist and anti-villain.

== Characterization ==
An English-born warlock, Sebastian is a black sheep of the Faust family, leaning toward heroics. He is known for lacking a soul from a demonic bargain wherein his father attempted to sell his soul for power, granted it instead. One side-effect granted him no pupils, leading him to obscure this with aviators and, while not impossible, finds difficult in formulating meaningful relations (platonic and romantic). He also considered among the most dangerous black magic practitioners on Earth (on par with Wizard (William Zard) and the Enchantress), also having a negative reputation due to his ties with his father. Following DC Rebirth, his reputation shifted more positively as a A.R.G.U.S. director and most proficient wizard in its ranks until his defection.

The most reoccurring theme of the character is his relationship with his dysfunctional family; as an infant, Felix once used him as a bargaining tool and taught him the mystic arts. Despite his abuse, Sebastian often yearns to make amends with his father and respects his skills. The older brother of Fauna, the pair hold a rivalry but he holds sympathy and care for her due to also being similarly abused. Sebastian and Fauna's unnamed mother remains his favored parent although she delved into the dark arts due to Felix's influence.

=== Love interests ===
Faust's first love interest was Halo, whom Faust initially was portrayed as having feelings for and Halo skeptical and rejecting of his advances due to the mistrust the Outsiders team had for him initially. Eventually the two would pursue a romantic relationship for a time. Later, Faust was slated to be June Moone's love ahead of the Day of Judgement crossover; developing feelings for her, he reluctantly nearly slays her Enchantress personality in a complex bid to reignite the flames of Hell with a truly evil act to restore balance, culminating to becoming guilt-ridden and sacrificing his soul he had briefly regained moments prior. In succeeding events, he frequently visits her in psychiatry ward as the experience rendered her catatonic and vows to fix the damage he caused. Later, June is forced to merge with Enchantress, restoring her and birthing a brief new persona who is moved by his later "sacrifice" while battling a powerful sorcerer whom has possessed Felix Faust's body. When June opts to reignite her relationship with Alan Dell, he decides to keep his distance. In DC Rebirth, Faust becomes involved with a dryad, whom he later marries. While pregnant with his son, she contracts a mystical illness and is a major catalyst for his eventual betrayal of A.R.G.U.S. and goal to eradicate the world of magic, which would also cease the mystical illness.

== Fictional character biography ==
=== Origin and background ===
In his original origin, he is the British eldest son of Felix Faust and older brother to future villainess, Fauna Faust. Trained relentlessly in the mystic arts, an older Sebastian is later made to undergo an initiation ritual by Felix. However, it is revealed the "initiation" was actual a sacrificial ritual and Faustian bargain to restore Felix's former power to naturally initiate magic. Tricked by the demon, Sebastian instead gains the power and flees, abandoning his sister to Felix's machinations. His origin is later revised, his soul having been sold as an infant (as opposed to being a teenager) and the demon specified as Nebiros, enemy of Swamp Thing and Blue Devil, granting him soul magic and the power to initiate magic but at the cost of an uncontrollable negative emotion projection power, causing others to become more angry or tense the longer they are around Sebastian and renders emotional connections with others more difficult.

Other aspects of his revised background amplifies mystical abusive tendencies from Felix, having branded magical symbols onto his body (implied to eb hidden via charms in adulthood) and seduced Sebastian and Fauna's mother into the dark arts to alleviate pain when she developed acute myeloid leukemia after birthing Fauna until she is killed in a car crash.

=== Sorcerous superhero ===
In the second Outsiders, Faust works with the Outsiders and assists the team when they reform under the threat of a vampire invasion of Markovia. When Technocrat's bodyguard Charlie Wylde is attacked by a bear but saves his life by fusing him with the bear, granting him super-powers but at the cost of losing his human life. The Outsiders are on the run for some time, having been framed by the head vampire, Roderick, for the murder of the traitorous Queen Ilona. It is not known that Ilona is trying to kill the Outsiders. Eventually the team clears their names. Throughout his tenure, Faust is not trusted by many of his teammates. Despite this, he develops a romantic relationship with Halo. Soon, Felix, along with Fauna, attacks the team, drawing them into a different dimension. The team suffers various tortures, and survives only due to the flexible laws of reality in this realm. Faust leads an escape attempt. After the team breaks up, Faust tries to pursue a solo career. Faust became a frequent guest at an intergalactic rave known as the "Event Horizon". When Raver hero Half-Life required new reanimated body parts, Faust agreed to help. While performing an incantation, Klarion the Witch Boy sabotages his incantation and causes his ectoplasm to gain sentience. When knocked out, Hero Cruz used the H-Dial to acquire Faust's powers and banishes the entity that taken over his ectoplasm.

==== Day of Judgement and the Black Baptism ====
During the 1999 DC Comics crossover event, Day of Judgment, Faust joins with other magical characters of the DC Universe to form the Sentinels of Magic. The denizens of Hell have invaded Earth, led by Asmodel, an angel with the powers of the Spectre. Faust teams up with a varied group of superheroes, including Atom, Superman, Firestorm and Enchantress. They travel to Hell itself and eventually, to the City of Dis, Hell's center of power, to relight its fires. During the trip, the heroes are temporarily trapped under the frozen River Styx. Faust manages to rescue Enchantress first; since he has no soul, he is not tormented by the river's waters. Inside the city, the heroes discover the demon Nebiros, who has stayed behind to guard the frozen fires. In battle, Faust releases Blue Devil, whose bones he had apparently bought from a mysterious marketplace. Nebiros is slain due to Firestorm changing the water in his body to cement. Faust regains his soul. When the combined forces of the superheroes are not enough to relight the fires. Faust realizes what must be done and murders Enchantress, losing his soul, restarting the fires, and saving the Earth all at once.

In the aftermath of this event, Faust, having developed romantic feelings for Enchantress, would work to find ways of reviving Enchantress. Faust next appears during the Black Baptism event. Over the course of the story, he works both with and against the Justice League, before ultimately tapping their souls to stop the mighty sorcerer Hermes Trismegistus. Faust comes to realize his newfound friend, Blue Devil, is only staying with him because of the magical nature of his revival. Not willing to risk Blue Devil's safety, he eliminates the magical connection by plunging the last of Blue Devil's bones into his back. Following the battles, Faust fakes the death of both himself and his father. Blue Devil soon dies in battle against Hermes but is revived.

==== Checkmate (2006–2008) and later stories ====
Faust was first mentioned in the 2006 Checkmate series as a consultant brought in by the intelligence organization to program magical capacities and defenses into their technological creation, Gideon-II. Later, he is revealed to be a member of the clandestine spy organization as one of their elite teams, "The Rooks". His callsign designation in Checkmate is "Rook Gamma". He is called upon to help neutralize a medical facility occupied by Kobra cultivating mutant, snake-like infants through the use of blood magic to be future soldiers of Kobra.

Faust would make an appearance in the aftermath of the Brightest Day as he helps the Justice League of America and Justice Society of America contain the chaos created from the revival of the Starheart, which causes metahumans of magical origin around the world to go wild. Using his expertise in the occult, he helps the Justice League and the JSA defeat the consciousness of the Starheart, who has taken the form of famed hero and Green Lantern Alan Scott and taken control of the newest incarnation of Doctor Fate, Kent V. Nelson. He also helps the superhero Jade come to terms with her resurrection and newfound heighten levels of power resulting from her coming back from the dead.

=== DC Rebirth onward ===
In the revised continuity following The New 52, elements of his previous history is present although minor facts have changed, with Felix having instead sold his soul in a bid for immortality. He is also the grandson of Majika the Magnificent. Seemingly after his time as a superhero on the Outsiders, he is eventually made the mystic head of A.R.G.U.S.'s mystic department, Project: Blackroom. During his tenure as a director, he encounters a dyad thief and falls in love with her, eventually marrying her and bearing a son.

In the Suicide Squad: Black Files limited series, Faust betrays America and A.R.G.U.S., stealing all of the magical artifacts A.R.G.U.S. held as well as the Russian's own stockpile of mystical weaponry while assuming control of former mystical terrorist cell he fought against, Cerebus. In response, Amanda Waller assembled a sorcery team to counter the wizard but is unable to track their movements due to Faust's actions and enlists the aid of Klarion, who tells her that she is to assemble a different team of magical users to battle Faust. With a mystical team, the Suicide Squad Black, consisting of El Diablo, Enchantress, Klarion, Gentleman Ghost, Azucar, and Dr. Thaumaturge, they find themselves opposed by Faust and his followers, including his majordomo Tiamat (the former Snargoyle of the previous sorcery team) and acolyte Wither. Faust planned to use multiple powerful mystic artifacts and assemble a weapon known as the Quellzorn, a mystic behemoth capable of feeding all magic to remove magic all together, having become disillusioned with its existence after both his experiences in seeing its capability to make others suffer and its personal effect on him due to having accidentally infected his dryad wife, pregnant with his unborn son, with a fatal mystic illness from a spell he caught in his work. Eventually, the team emerges victorious and Faust is defeated. He is later taken in by the Justice League to be rehabilitated.

Faust would later make brief appearance Other History of the DC Universe within Katana's recount taking place during the Outsiders series, referencing past exploits prior to becoming a spymaster of A.R.G.U.S. She remarked how Violet's soul asserted the being who would take Violet's body and mentioned Violet's indulgence in pleasures included a sexual relationship with Faust.

== Powers and abilities ==
Faust is a warlock considered an "adept" in black magic and soul magic, specializing in the latter and giving him the ability to siphon super-powers and drain the life-force of others through tactile contact. He is also a practitioner of "logomancy" similar to heroes like Zatanna and Zatara, allowing him to cast magical effects by speaking backwards. In addition to his magical abilities, Faust is a proficient occult investigator and possesses extensive knowledge of the supernatural, excelling as an occult transcriber. Faust is also adept at covering his tracks, espionage, hand-to-hand combat, and leadership. Furthermore, he exhibits a high resistance to mystical corruption and soul erosion due to his lack of a soul and strong willpower. Faust possesses several talismans, most notably a belt and magical pouches. His pouches, made of high-grade steel and concealed within a medium-sized cloth bag, have mystical properties that allow them to hold a vast number of artifacts, energies, and other surprises.

=== Weaknesses ===
Faust's magical powers come with several drawbacks; early appearances rendered a cost to his black magic known as "feedback." This feedback causes his spells to overload, affecting his surroundings and causing physical pain to Faust himself. Additionally, his soul magic inadvertently has an impact on others in which the more time people spend in his presence, the more prone they become to feeling tense and irritated, making it challenging for Faust to form meaningful relationships and to process emotions although the effects on others can vary. His abilities were also said to be inferior to those of Doctor Fate.

== Reception ==
Introduced as one of the three new characters (alongside Technocrat and Wylde) in the Outsiders roster, the character was noted to be the most well-received from fan mail during the series' run as well as having become a reoccurring character appearing in the greater DC Universe.

== Other versions ==
- An alternate universe version of Sebastian Faust appears in Mystik U. This version is a student of the titular school and love interest of Zatanna.
- An alternate universe version of Sebastian Faust who became the leader of the Sentinels of Magic appears in Flashpoint Beyond.
