= Shadowpact =

Magical superhero group

- Cover of Shadowpact #1 (July 2006), art by Bill Willingham.

Publication information
- Publisher: DC Comics
- First appearance: Day of Vengeance #1 (June 2005)
- Created by: Bill Willingham (writer and artist)

In-story information
- Base(s): Oblivion Bar
- Member(s): Blue Devil; Detective Chimp; Enchantress; Nightmaster; Nightshade; Ragman; Warlock's Daughter; Zauriel

The Shadowpact is a fictional group of magic-based heroes who fought against the Spectre in the 2005 limited series Day of Vengeance, published by DC Comics.

Their self-titled series ended in May 2008, after 25 issues and a two-year run, but the team appeared in the Reign in Hell miniseries three months later.

== History ==
The group is founded on a spur of the moment impulse by Enchantress, Ragman, and Detective Chimp to get rid of the Spectre because of his decision to destroy all magic in the universe. They are joined by Blue Devil, Nightshade, and Nightmaster, who christens the group the "Shadowpact".

During the course of the story, it is revealed by the wizard Shazam that the name "Shadowpact" has been used repetitively throughout history by groups of mystics who champion lost causes.

In their fight with the Spectre, the group is aided by others such as the Phantom Stranger, who advises Detective Chimp after being transformed into a rodent; Captain Marvel; the wizard Shazam; and Black Alice. At the end of the limited series, only the six core members remain with the team. The Phantom Stranger, returning to human form, continues to advise the group. Captain Marvel is defeated by the Spectre as he tries to defend the Rock of Eternity. The wizard Shazam is also defeated by the Spectre. Black Alice, after witnessing the final battle on the Rock from afar with the Shadowpact, leaves to be with her father in Dayton, Ohio, without formally joining the team.

The debris from the Rock of Eternity falls as far as El Paso, Texas. There, the Shadowpact leaps into action when half a skyscraper begins to fall. Superman saves the day, repairing the building at super-speed. The Shadowpact assures him they will stay and protect El Paso. Behind them, unnoticed, the Blue Beetle scarab is found by a teenager named Jaime Reyes.

Some time afterward, the Shadowpact helps Robin in rounding up metahumans in Blüdhaven, right before the city is destroyed. During the adventure, they are again aided by another magic-based hero, the Warlock's Daughter.

The Shadowpact are headquartered in the Oblivion Bar, a hangout for mystics with a secret entrance in Gotham City. Jim Rook was the owner of the bar. During the team's one-year absence (see below), a flipper-armed conjurer named Eddie Deacon took over. Deacon retains ownership, despite Rook's return. Rook works to reclaim the bar by not advising Deacon how to run it; for example, Deacon does not know the code to dial earthly phones. The Shadowpact does not take the bar by force, for Deacon has the ability to telekinetically squeeze small things, such as airways.

=== Day of Vengeance: Infinite Crisis Special #1 ===
In Day of Vengeance: Infinite Crisis Special #1, the Shadowpact members join other magic users in trying to rebuild the Rock of Eternity after it shatters over Gotham City. Under the guidance of the Phantom Stranger, the gathered heroes split into three groups: one led by Zatanna to gather and reassemble all the pieces of the Rock and its contents; one to act as bait for the Seven Deadly Sins; and one, composed of the Phantom Stranger and the Shadowpact, to actually trap the Sins. The plan works well, with Zatanna's team making relatively short work of the retrieval and reconstruction. After capturing Greed, Nightshade is attacked and abducted by Felix Faust and the Demons Three, who deliver her to Alexander Luthor Jr., who incorporates her into his multiverse power battery.

With the Rock of Eternity restored, Zatanna tells Captain Marvel that he will have to remain inside it to make sure the wild magic it holds remains contained. While the Rock is being restored, Nabu, the last Lord of Order, confronts the Spectre. He goads the Spectre to the point where the Spectre kills him. This act has two results. First, it forces the Presence to notice what the Spectre has been doing and place him in a new host, Crispus Allen. Second, it signals the end of the Ninth Age of Magic and the Dawn of the Tenth. Making it to the Rock, Nabu has time before he dies to explain to the heroes what has happened to the Spectre, and to charge Detective Chimp with choosing a new Doctor Fate. Finding that the Helm of Fate does not fit him, Detective Chimp gives it to Captain Marvel to throw from the Rock and let it fall to Earth, letting fate itself choose the new Doctor Fate.

=== Shadowpact series ===
Shadowpact

Publication information
- Publisher: DC Comics
- Schedule: Monthly
- Format: Standard U.S., 4-color
- Publication date: July 2006 – May 2008
- No. of issues: 25
- Main character: Shadowpact

Creative team
- Created by: Bill Willingham
- Written by: Bill Willingham; Lilah Sturges (as Matthew Sturges)
- Penciller(s): Bill Willingham; Cory Walker; Steve Scott; Tom Derenick; Shawn McManus
- Inker(s): Bill Willingham; Wayne Faucher; Cory Walker; Shawn McManus
- Colorist(s): Chris Chuckry; Michael Atiyeh

A Shadowpact ongoing series saw publication in May 2006. The team is now operating out of the back of the Oblivion Bar.

In the first arc, a villain group known as the Pentacle, whose members mirror the Shadowpact, is introduced. The Pentacle, led by the sorceress Strega, forms a nearly impenetrable shield of solid blood over Riverrock, Wyoming, and systematically begins to kill the townspeople as a means to summon Strega's master, the Lord of Light. The Shadowpact enter the town with the help of the Phantom Stranger. The Shadowpact is captured by the Pentacle, with the exception of Detective Chimp, who was taken away by Karnevil, who tortures him. In his magical imprisonment, the White Rabbit proposes to free the Shadowpact members so that the Nightmaster hones his skills and meet him on a future match. Nightmaster agrees, and following their release, Enchantress attacks White Rabbit because she distrusts him. After that, they find Chimp and overpower the Pentacle, the Enchantress breaks Strega's spell, but the necromantic nature of the magic meant that to avoid having to kill anyone to undo the spell, she is forced to instead take one year (which passes immediately) from the life of everyone in the town.

In their next storyline, the members of the Shadowpact have found themselves targeted by a whole host of villains including Blue Moon, the Wild Huntsman, and the Congregation. They are all following the orders of Doctor Gotham, a new villain who has spent millennia underground—claiming responsibility for Gotham's dark nature as he 'slept' under the city—and has now set his sights on getting rid of the Shadowpact. Strega has also been revealed to be his ally, and he was responsible for the previous threats that the Shadowpact thwarted. During this arc, Enchantress and Ragman are both turned into Hellhounds by the Wild Huntsman, and Nightshade, Blue Devil, and the Ragman are all blinded by the Congregation. Despite these injuries, the Shadowpact manage to force the Congregation to retreat. With help from Madame Xanadu, they manage to cure their blinded teammates and, despite all their recent troubles, the Shadowpact now find themselves in a stronger position in the magical order. The Enchantress gained the possession of the Herne-Ramsgate Cauldron from Nightwitch, which gives the Shadowpact access to information on every magical creature in the DC Universe, while Detective Chimp and Nightmaster have studied tactical and superhero strategies in order to mold the Shadowpact into the best team possible. A part of this was writing the "Three Universal Laws of Superheroics", a tip of the hat to Isaac Asimov's Three Laws of Robotics, as recited by Detective Chimp.

First Law: The lives and safety of innocent bystanders will always be protected.
Second Law: The lives and safety of you (the superhero) and members of your team will be protected to the extent that it does not conflict with the First Law.
Third Law: The lives and safety of all opponents will be protected to the extent that it does not conflict with the first two Laws.

Checkmate deputizes the Shadowpact in order for them to assist the Black Queen in infiltrating Kobra. The team originally thinks this will be a one-time arrangement, but Checkmate's Black Queen informs them that they will serve Checkmate for as long as they are needed, to the annoyance of the Enchantress.

=== "The Burning Age" ===
In the final storyline before the book was cancelled, the Phantom Stranger brings the Shadowpact teams of 1908 and 2108 to the present in order to combat the Sun King, revealed as the power behind Doctor Gotham. In the final battle, various Shadowpact teams from throughout history are united, fighting the Sun King in multiple time zones simultaneously.

After his defeat, the Phantom Stranger reveals that this has changed history and previous Shadowpacts are no longer remembered as failures.

== Membership ==
=== Founding members ===
Blue Devil
Daniel Cassidy is a former Hollywood stuntman cursed by the demon Neron, now demoted to a Rhyming Demon.
Detective Chimp
Bobo T. Chimpanzee is the world's greatest simian detective.
The Enchantress
June Moone, given great power by a mysterious magical being.
The Nightmaster
Jim Rook, wielder of the "Nightblade", former leader of the Shadowpact and former owner of the Oblivion Bar.
Nightshade
Eve Eden, refugee from the Land of the Nightshades and former government operative.
The Ragman
Rory Regan, latest in a long line of redeemers who use the "Great Collector Artifact" to fight evil.

=== Temporary members ===
Acheron
Professes to be a powerful ghost, but not in the Spectre's league. He is able to create illusions and become intangible.
The Midnight Rider
Eli Stone, wields a pair of enchanted six-shooters he calls "Ghost Pistols" that only appear at night. Whoever or whatever is shot by them turns to stone and reverts to normal when the sun's rays shine down on them.
The Warlock's Daughter
Laura Fell (born Darla Aquista) is the former acolyte of Johnny Warlock. Laura and Johnny share the same power source and were both confined at the Dark Tower.
Zauriel
The fallen angel and former member of the JLA who was sent by Heaven to kill Blue Devil, but joined as his replacement while Blue Devil sorted out his own issues.

=== Shadowpact of 1908 ===
Adept
Mysterious master of occult knowledge.
The Civet
Catlike reflexes, and skilled in subterfuge.
The Fairy Queen
Empress of the wee folk.
Mister Meteor
Magically massive pugilist from Russia who gained his power from the Tunguska event.
Mrs. Adeline Prescott
Medium and psychic extraordinaire.

=== Shadowpact of 2108 ===
Apalala
Buddhist dragon.
Brazen Man
Unearthed alchemical powerhouse.
Magus Eximius
The last word in 22nd century magic. Learned incantations of advanced temporal thaumatics and other magicks from his eventual lover, the Warlock's Daughter.
Miss Poltergeist
Teen angst made manifest, her psychic powers increase based upon her rage levels.
Revenant
Dangerous, destructive, and dead.
Sardonyxx
Exiled princess of a lost world, she wields a powerful scepter that can sense tracings of magical beings and their magical properties.

=== Associates ===
- Phantom Stranger
- Black Alice
- Madame Xanadu
- Captain Marvel
- Sasha Bordeaux
- Rex the Wonder Dog

== In other media ==
Shadowpact appears in Smallville Season 11: Olympus, consisting of John Zatara, Mister Bones and Felix Faust. This version of the group was formed during World War II to serve as an anti-occult task force and combat the Thule Society until Faust and Bones betrayed the group to receive eternal youth from Hades.

== Collected editions ==
Title	Material collected	Publication date	ISBN
Vol. 1: The Pentacle Plot	Shadowpact #1–3, 5–8	June 2007	1-8457-6533-8
Vol. 2: Cursed	Shadowpact #4, 9–13	January 2008	1-8457-6738-1
Vol. 3: Darkness and Light	Shadowpact #14–19	June 2008	1-8457-6892-2
Vol. 4: The Burning Age	Shadowpact #20–25	January 2009	978-1401221591

The Day of Vengeance storyline has also been collected into a single volume:

- Day of Vengeance (collects Day of Vengeance #1–6, Action Comics #826, The Adventures of Superman #639, Superman (vol. 2) #216), 224 pages, December 2005, ISBN 1-4012-0840-1

== See also ==
- Sentinels of Magic
