= Detective Chimp =

Fictional character in DC Comics

- Promotional art for The Helmet of Fate: Detective Chimp #1 (March 2007) cover, art by Brian Bolland.

Publication information
- Publisher: DC Comics
- First appearance: Adventures of Rex the Wonder Dog #4 (July–August 1952)
- Created by: John Broome; Carmine Infantino

In-story information
- Alter ego: Bobo T. Chimpanzee
- Species: Common chimpanzee
- Team affiliations: Justice League Dark; Justice League; Shadowpact; Legion of Super-Pets; The Amazing Zoo Crew; Bureau of Amplified Animals; Chimpanzee Investigations; Croatoan Society
- Notable aliases: Magnificent Finder of Tasty Grubs; Detective B. T. Chimp; Nightmaster
- Abilities: Genius-level intellect; Expert detective; Ability to speak to all animals; Skilled swordsman and marksman; Occult and magic knowledge; Inherent attributes of Earth chimpanzee (strength, agility)

Detective Chimp (Bobo T. Chimpanzee) is a superhero appearing in American comic books published by DC Comics. A common chimpanzee who wears a deerstalker cap (à la fictional sleuth Sherlock Holmes), Detective Chimp has superhuman-level intelligence and solves crimes, often with the help of the Bureau of Amplified Animals, a group of intelligent animals that also includes Rex the Wonder Dog. He originally appeared in the final years of the Golden Age of Comic Books, continuing into the early years of the Silver Age.

After his initial appearance in Adventures of Rex the Wonder Dog he continued to appear in that title as a backup feature until 1959, at which point he faded into obscurity. Several decades after his last appearance, Detective Chimp appeared in several cameos, namely in a 1981 story, "Whatever Happened to Rex the Wonder Dog?" (DC Comics Presents #35) and later in a brief cameo with Sam Simeon in Gorilla City during 1985's Crisis on Infinite Earths. Following these appearances, Bobo started appearing in DC titles with some regularity, appearing in issues of Green Lantern, The Flash, and other titles. This eventually led to prominent roles in the 2005 Day of Vengeance miniseries and subsequently as a regular in its spin-off series Shadowpact. The character has gone on to guest-star in other DC Comics titles, and has been a key member of the second incarnation of the Justice League Dark since its 2018 reboot.

Detective Chimp has made limited appearances in media outside comics, with Kevin Michael Richardson and Fred Tatasciore voicing him in Batman: The Brave and the Bold and Teen Titans Go! respectively.

== Fictional character biography ==
When first introduced, Detective Chimp was an ordinary, though intelligent, trained chimpanzee, who acted as a "helping mascot" for the local sheriff, after helping him to solve the murder of his chimpanzee trainer, Fred Thorpe. He could not speak, but could understand humans and make himself understood. Bobo, a smoker, is a member of Mensa, and had a long-standing partnership with four other detectives as the Croatoan Society. One of the other former members of the Society was the detective/superhero Ralph Dibny (Elongated Man).

The Chimp's origin has been revamped and elaborated on several times since his initial Silver Age appearances. Secret Origins (vol. 2) #40 (1989) credited the experimentation of a microscopic alien race with Bobo's intelligence. This origin has since been retconned, notably in the Day of Vengeance six-part limited series. In the latter, it was shown that Bobo was captured in Gorilla City in 1953 by Fred Thorpe, who sought to train him for his carnival act: "Bobo the Detective Chimp". For the act, Detective Chimp was trained to answer some detective-related questions using a combination of signals and rewards, giving the illusion that he could "discover the deepest secrets of the public". Bobo formed a strong bond with Thorpe because Thorpe took care of him, and gave him a simpler life than in the jungle. The success of the act lasted until a trip to Florida, at which time Rex the Wonder Dog took him to the Fountain of Youth, where he gained the ability to speak to all living creatures, even humans, in their own language, as well as eternal youth. Rex's and Bobo's journey to the Fountain of Youth was originally depicted in the aforementioned DC Comics Presents #35, July 1981. The intelligence Bobo gained put a damper on the success of the sideshow act, and in at least one instance, he decided that a woman had in fact murdered her sister, and shared his insights with the local police.

At some point after this, Bobo was employed by the Bureau of Amplified Animals. It is not known how he left or if the Bureau still exists.

After the death of Fred Thorpe, he began to work by himself. Initially he did quite well, as a chimp detective was seen as a novelty. During this successful period he was visited by another detective, John Jones (actually the Martian Manhunter, during the JLApe crisis), who thought Bobo's agency seemed to be doing better than his own.

However, as an ape, without civil rights and being unable to stand as a juridical person, he could not enforce unpaid bills. When the public began to forget him, he became an alcoholic, never leaving the other-dimensional Oblivion Bar (which changed management twice during his time there), until the establishment was acquired by Jim Rook.

"Bobo" is not his real name, which he declines to share. Phantom Stranger revealed it to be "mostly an unpronounceable screech and three grunts", which translates as "Magnificent Finder of Tasty Grubs".

=== Shadowpact ===
Detective Chimp in modern times. A panel from Day of Vengeance#1 (June 2006), art by Justiniano.

When the Spectre attempts to destroy all magic and began killing wizards, Detective Chimp, while still mostly drunk, coerces a group of mystical characters gathered from the Oblivion Bar into battling the Spectre. This leads to the formation of the group Shadowpact.

Although lacking superhuman powers, Detective Chimp exhibits not only fine detective skills but also the genius of a true tactician. Benefiting from the counsel of the Phantom Stranger (at the time transformed into a mouse), he devises a plan to use the powers of Black Alice and Nightshade to confront the combined menace of Eclipso and the Spectre.

Bobo also helps clean up the demonic damage left from the Rock of Eternity's explosion over Gotham City. He captures the sin of "Sloth", which had possessed his long-time friend Rex the Wonder Dog. After the Rock is reformed, the sins re-imprisoned, and all magical influence cleaned out of Gotham, the dying Doctor Fate gives Detective Chimp his Helmet of Fate. After finding it does not fit him, Detective Chimp convinces Captain Marvel to throw the helmet to Earth, letting fate choose its next bearer.

When the helmet of Doctor Fate returns to Earth, Detective Chimp briefly bonds with it, granting him additional powers that he uses to assist the Gotham City police in apprehending the villain Trickster. After struggling against the helmet's temptation, Bobo sends it on to another journey.

Later, it is shown that Bobo occasionally assists Batman in his cases by way of a chat room where they swap theories. The Riddler is also known to chat with them, but is unaware of their identities.

=== The New 52 ===
In The New 52, Detective Chimp has been mentioned by Ambush Bug in the Channel 52 feature sections. He later appears as a brief cameo in aiding the Justice League United team rescue Adam Strange from the Zeta Beam and in the 2016 DC Comics Rebirth Christmas Special story "The Night We Saved Christmas".

=== DC Rebirth ===
In DC Rebirth, Detective Chimp, a.k.a. Bobo, has appeared in the Dark Nights: Metal event, is one of the survivors of the invasion of the Dark Nights (alternate versions of Batman from a Dark Multiverse) and is seen at the Oblivion Bar alongside the Justice League, Kendra Saunders, Doctor Fate and others. Bobo's close friend Nightmaster, the owner of the Oblivion Bar, is killed during the confrontation. Bobo later takes over the bar and Nightmaster's mystical duties.

=== New Justice ===
In the New Justice era, Bobo becomes a central part of a new mystical team called Justice League Dark. This is led by Wonder Woman, and includes but is not limited to, John Constantine, Zatanna, Doctor Fate, Man-Bat, and Swamp Thing. Bobo loses his friend Blue Devil to mystical purists.

=== Dawn of DC ===
In the Knight Terrors storyline, Detective Chimp and several other members of Justice League Dark fall victim to the spells of Insomnia, becoming trapped in his Knightmare Realm. Remaining awake through the chaos, Zatanna and Robotman team up to defend the unconscious Wonder Woman and Detective Chimp from Insomnia's forces.

In the series "The New Golden Age", Detective Chimp accompanies Doctor Fate in looking for Deadman to see if he can help them understand Hauhet, the new guiding force of the Helmet of Fate. When a Huntress from a possible future arrives in the present day, she encounters Doctor Fate, Detective Chimp, and Deadman. After Huntress relays her background and prior encounter with Per Degaton, Detective Chimp, and Deadman plan to take the snow globe in Huntress' possession to Madame Xanadu to get answers. Xanadu informs Detective Chimp and Deadman that they have to get the snow globe back to Huntress, or else Degaton will kill her.

== Powers and abilities ==
Detective Chimp possesses no unusual physical abilities, save the level of agility and physical strength that comes with being a chimpanzee with human knowledge of movement and tools. He is capable of conversing with all animals, regardless of origin, in their own language, including all spoken and written human languages. He is also one of the most highly skilled investigators in the world, with detective skills rivaling those of Ralph Dibny and Batman. Bobo has an Intelligence Quotient estimated to be higher than 98 percent of the adult (human) population, as evidenced by his Mensa membership and his ability to decode the long-unsolved Voynich manuscript. Detective Chimp's hyper-intelligence has shown to have its downsides however as he has claimed it is difficult for him to concentrate without the help of alcohol to focus his mind. For a brief time, Detective Chimp had additional sense-expanding powers granted by the Helmet of Fate.

== Other versions ==
- Detective Chimp appears in Tangent: Superman's Reign as an alias of Guy Gardner.
- An alternate timeline version of Detective Chimp appears in DC One Million.
- An alternate universe version of Detective Chimp from Earth-52 appears in Dark Nights: Metal.
- An alternate timeline version of Detective Chimp who succeeded Jason Blood as Etrigan's host appears in Future State.

== In other media ==
=== Television ===
- Detective Chimp appears in Batman: The Brave and the Bold, voiced by Kevin Michael Richardson. This version speaks with a pronounced English dialect.
- Detective Chimp appears in Teen Titans Go!, voiced initially by Scott Menville and subsequently by Fred Tatasciore.
- Detective Chimp appears in Kite Man: Hell Yeah!, voiced by Phil LaMarr.

=== Films ===
- Detective Chimp appears in Scooby-Doo! & Batman: The Brave and the Bold, voiced again by Kevin Michael Richardson.
- Detective Chimp appears in Teen Titans Go! To the Movies.

=== Video games ===
- Detective Chimp appears as a playable character in Lego Batman 3: Beyond Gotham, voiced by Dee Bradley Baker.
- Detective Chimp appears as a character summon in Scribblenauts Unmasked: A DC Comics Adventure.
- Detective Chimp was originally set to appear as a playable character in Injustice 2, but was cut for unknown reasons.
- Detective Chimp appears as a playable character in Lego DC Super-Villains.

=== Miscellaneous ===
- Detective Chimp appears in Justice League Unlimited #39.
- Detective Chimp appears in a self-titled issue of the DC Comics Super Hero Collection.
- Detective Chimp appears in the Injustice: Gods Among Us prequel comic. This version is a member of Batman's Insurgency who is later wounded by the Spectre, forcing Klarion the Witch Boy to use his magic to keep him alive before Sinestro kills them both.
