= Ragman (character) =

- Ragman as depicted in Ragman: Suit of Souls #1 (October 2010). Art by Jesús Saíz.

Publication information
- Publisher: DC Comics
- First appearance: Ragman #1 (August/September 1976)
- Created by: Robert Kanigher; Joe Kubert

In-story information
- Alter ego: Rory Regan
- Team affiliations: Shadowpact; Sentinels of Magic; Outsiders; Justice League Dark; United States Marine Corps
- Abilities: Enhanced physical attributes; Enchanted costume; Limited flight; Skilled in the use of magic

Ragman (Rory Regan) is a superhero appearing in American comic books published by DC Comics. He was originally created by writer Robert Kanigher and artist Joe Kubert in 1976. Originally presented as a man of Irish descent, the character was revised to have Jewish heritage (his family name originally being Reganiewicz) and a connection to the Golem of Prague (a figure of Jewish folklore) in a 1991 mini-series by Keith Giffen, Robert Loren Fleming, Pat Broderick, and Anthony Tollin. The same mini-series established Ragman's costume as a "Suit of Souls", and repeatedly drew him into conflict with mystical threats and granted him the power and skills of the souls it collected. The suit sometimes desired to collect new souls, forcing Ragman to exert great will if he did not wish the suit to do so.

In his original stories, Ragman is a Vietnam War veteran and the sole survivor of an attack on his father and friends, inexplicably gaining their collective skills and strengths. Wearing a costume his father made out of rags, he uses these abilities to protect his neighborhood from criminals. Starting in 1991, Rory Regan's origin and nature were revised, making him a Vietnam veteran of Jewish heritage who inherits the mystical Suit of Souls after his father was killed by criminals. Worn by many champions over the centuries, each patch of the costume possesses the soul of a corrupt person who offers their skills, knowledge, protection, and strength to Ragman to earn redemption and release. The series Shadowpact said Ragman's costume was first created in 1812 BCE and has taken on different forms in different eras, but this idea has not been recognized in other stories. In 2017, a revised version of Ragman was introduced with a new origin, appearance, and nature.

Ragman appeared in the fifth and final seasons of the Arrowverse television series Arrow, portrayed by Joe Dinicol.

== Development ==
During an interview, Kubert discussed how the idea for the character originated: "We thought that a superhero character dressed in rags might be a little bit different. What we were looking for, of course, was something along the lines of a superhero, but different from those that were already out. The character was to be dressed in rags. Then we gave him an identity. We went backwards and gave him a history. His father was to be an old circus performer and owning a junkyard now."

== Publication history ==
In June, 1976, DC Comics began publishing the bi-monthly comic book series Ragman (volume 1). The series began in June 1976 (cover dated September 1976) and only lasted 5 issues before ending in April 1977 (cover dated July 1977). Ragman was created by writer Robert Kanigher and artist Joe Kubert. The title character Rory Regan was presented as a vigilante who focused on standard urban crime threats such as gangsters, drug dealers, and thieves. After criminals cause power lines to fall to the ground, Rory, his father, and some friends of the family are simultaneously electrocuted. Rory is the only survivor, gaining the collective abilities and physical traits of the other men. The mini-series depicted Rory Reagan as a young man and former active member of the US Marine Corps who had served during the Vietnam War. The letters page of Ragman #3 specifically stated the character was intended by Kanigher and Kubert to be of Irish descent.

After his mini-series, this incarnation of Ragman did not appear regularly in the DC Comics universe beyond a minor cameo during the company-wide crossover Crisis on Infinite Earths. This same crossover resulted in much of DC Comics superhero canon being revised or rebooted. A new incarnation of Ragman with a new origin story was then presented in an 8-issue mini-series Ragman (vol. 2) which was published from July 1991 (cover dated October 1991) until March 1992 (cover dated July 1992). The mini-series was plotted by Keith Giffen, scripted by Robert Loren Fleming, illustrated by Pat Broderick, and colored by Anthony Tollin. The mini-series reinterpreted Ragman as a magic-empowered character native to Gotham City who deals not only with urban crime but also mystical threats. Rory Regan is still a veteran of the Vietnam War, with the story establishing him now as a divorced man who is "pushing middle age" when he first dons the costume. The mini-series reveals that Rory's father was a Jewish man born with the name Reganiewicz, which he changed and shortened after immigrating to the United States. The mini-series established the Ragman costume as a mystical "Suit of Souls" created during the 16th century by the same people who created the Golem of Prague (a figure of Jewish folklore). After the Golem is deemed dangerous, it is decided a human champion should be empowered rather than a soulless being made of clay. The mini-series establishes there have been several to carry the mantle of Ragman before Rory, including his own father Gerry, who attempted to protect Jews from Nazis during World War II. Now inheriting the costume and role, Rory Regan is depicted as a hero who struggles to control the Suit of Souls and not give into his emotions when facing criminals. The mini-series includes a cameo by Batman and ends with Rory leaving Gotham to relocate to New Orleans.

A year later, Ragman appeared again in the 6-issue mini-series Ragman: Cry of the Dead, published from May to November 1993. The story takes place in New Orleans and involves Voodoo magical practices and beliefs. The story also details more of Rory's romantic past concerning a lost love and his later marriage and divorce involving another woman.

Ragman appeared again in a two-part story published in Batman #551 and 552, published in December 1997 and January 1998, respectively (though the issues are cover dated as February 1998 and March 1998). The story depicts Rory returning to Gotham City from New Orleans, only to then lose control of his Suit of Souls as it hunts down evil men to kill and absorb. After seeking aid from Batman and a rabbi, the story ends with Rory regaining control of his suit.

In 1999, Ragman plays a role in the Day of Judgment mini-series, acting as a defender for Earth against a demon invasion. At the conclusion of the Day of Judgment mini-series, he joins a loose organization of mystically empowered heroes known as the Sentinels of Magic.

In the 2005–2006 mini-series Day of Vengeance, a tie-in to the company-wide crossover Infinite Crisis, Ragman joins Shadowpact, a group of magic-users who oppose the Spectre. Following Infinite Crisis, Ragman was a regular cast member of the Shadowpact comic book series. The series was published from 2006 to 2008, ending after 25 issues, and revised parts of Ragman's history, saying the costume had originally come into being in 1812 BCE and could take on different forms (such as a knife or spear) without altering its powers. In the series, the Shadowpact group faces a group of villains known as the Pentacle, a member of whom is an evil Ragman counterpart known as Bagman. The team, Ragman included, then appeared in DC's Reign in Hell crossover mini-series in 2008.

In 2010, a one-shot comic entitled Ragman: Suit of Souls was produced by writer Christos N. Gage, artist Steven Segovia, colorist David Curiel, and letterer Rob Leigh. The one-shot did not reference revelations about the character made in the Shadowpact series. While retelling the origin established in the 1991 mini-series, the comic added that Gerry Regan had already been middle-aged or older when Rory was born and that Rory still seemed to be a man in his 40s due to the Suit of Souls slowing down his aging. This was to allow for Rory to continue being a Vietnam War veteran with a father who had been active as Ragman during World War II. The one-shot established that the souls of Ragman's costume are redeemed in part by acknowledging and understanding the harm they caused.

In 2011, DC Comics revised its entire superhero universe with its "New 52" line of comic books. In 2015, the New 52 version of Rory Regan appears as someone identical in nature and appearance to his Post-Crisis/Pre-New 52 incarnation. DC Comics then revised large parts of its New 52 canon during the 2016 event DC Rebirth.

Another version of Rory Regan appeared in the 2017 six-issue mini series Ragman (vol. 3). The mini-series was written by Ray Fawkes, illustrated by Inaki Miranda, and colored by Eva de la Cruz, with covers by Guillem March. This mini-series depicts a Ragman with an entirely new appearance and slightly different abilities, now using souls directly as fuel for his powers.

== Fictional character biography ==
=== Pre-Crisis ===
A Vietnam veteran, Rory Regan had grown up helping his father, a junk man who owned a pawn shop named Rags 'n' Tatters. His father always dreamed of making a better life for Rory and constantly promised that someday he would make Rory rich. While drinking with his friends one night, his father discovered two million United States dollars stuffed inside an old mattress that had been pawned just recently. He and his friends decided to hide the money for Rory, since they were too old to truly benefit from it. The money turned out to be the loot from an armored car heist and when the hoods came to the shop to get it, they shot down some electrical wires and used them to torture Rory's father and his friends into revealing where the money was hidden. Rory arrived soon after and, seeing his father in agony, attempted to free him from the wires. A final shock of power ran through the old men and grounded out at Rory, knocking him unconscious. When he regained consciousness, his father and friends were dead and the hoods responsible were gone. Using a costume made out of old rags (his father had bought it from a stranger before he died and left a note saying Rory could wear it to a costume party) he became Ragman, "the Tatterdemalion of Justice". Rory appeared to have gained the physical abilities of the men who were electrocuted since they were all touching as the final current of electricity flowed through them and into Rory. He gained an acrobat's agility, a strongman's strength, and a boxer's skills.

In his pre-Crisis incarnation, Rory Regan was Irish, not Jewish, as explicitly stated in the letters page of Ragman #3.

=== Post-Crisis ===
Rory Regan is a junk man, doing good in his community by buying used items from people who need money. The suit of rags that he wears, as mentioned above, was originally just a costume made from materials found around the rag shop, Rags'n'Tatters, that he shared with his father. This was retconned in a 1991–92 eight-issue limited series, and currently each of the patches in the suit is made from the soul of an evildoer that Ragman had punished and absorbed.

The absorption of these souls caused a problem for Rory at one point, when the evil souls hungered for murder and finally freed themselves of Ragman. It was only with the support of Batman and Rory's old friend, Rabbi Luria, that he regained control, though at the cost of Luria's life. Ragman's powers have increased since then. Currently, he can absorb souls into his costume. With each new soul added, a rag is added. He can call upon the souls in his costume to lend him their attributes or power. He is also a proficient magic user.

==== Judgment and vengeance ====
During the Day of Judgment limited series, Ragman is active in destroying many of the demons invading Earth. This would earn him the wrath of the Diablos, a group of demons who style themselves after the Mafia. Wanting to gain revenge for demons lost during the Day of Judgment, they attack Ragman, injuring him and tearing off parts of his costume. They mistakenly believe him to be dead.

Ragman is one of the members of Shadowpact, a team that formed to confront the Spectre in DC Comics 2005 Day of Vengeance limited series, a lead-up to the seven-issue Infinite Crisis limited series.

During the Infinite Crisis storyline, Ragman and Nightshade are seen standing side by side as part of the line of superheroes defending Metropolis from attack from dozens of villains.

During the series Day of Vengeance, Ragman is one of the few volunteers willing to take on the rampaging Spectre, who has decided that all magic is evil. During a planning session, he is taken aside by the Enchantress and given a mystical gun. She entrusts him with it, as it can kill her if she goes too far with her magic, a scenario that she believes is all too possible. He tells her if she truly turns evil, his costume will take her. He then tries to kiss her, but his feelings are not returned and Enchantress even mocks him for it in front of the other heroes.

==== Shadowpact ====
In the Shadowpact series, Ragman, along with his teammates, was trapped inside a shield of solid blood that grew over the town of Riverrock, Wyoming. Ragman and the rest of the team spend a very short period of time inside the shield, but due to magical after-effects, a full year passes outside. Various mystical heroes, such as Phantom Stranger and Rex the Wonder Dog keep watch outside the town's borders.

While inside Riverrock, Rory and Shadowpact faced off against the supervillain group that had formed the shield: the Pentacle. His Pentacle counterpart is named Bagman. He dresses in similar green garb, and can turn his body to goo and absorb people while in this form. While inside Bagman they either suffocate or they are digested. Bagman even mentioned how oddly similar Shadowpact and the Pentacle are. Rory only survives this encounter because Bagman's boss does not want the heroes to be killed. After the Riverrock encounter, Rory must deal with the severe disruption to his life, as everyone had thought he was dead. He, like most of the team, ends up having to find a new source of income, a place to stay and the oddity of encountering a memorial statue to the entire team.

In Shadowpact #8, Rory was temporarily trapped in the limbo dimension of his own cloak. He met the soul of an ancient centurion working off his crimes. This man, Marcus Liberius, first saved him from the beating several other of the murderous souls were giving Rory. Marcus reveals that the cloak was actually the "Great Collector Artifact", which has been in existence in many forms since the time of Abraham. Ragmen in Rory's line have been in action since 1812 BCE. Marcus also helped Rory, who had become disenchanted with the job of collecting corrupted souls, to see that he is not a punisher but a redeemer — allowing a better afterlife for those who work for it. This work usually takes the form of suffering on Rory's behalf. For example, Rory had been recently blinded by magic. Marcus willingly takes this blindness on, adding to previous injuries he had suffered. This last sacrifice allows Marcus, in the full view of the rest of the Shadowpact, to ascend to a higher realm.

Rory, along with Nightmaster and Nightshade, attempted to teleport to Washington D.C to break up a bank robbery. They were trapped in mid-transit in the Land of Nightshades.

=== Trinity ===
In the weekly series Trinity, Ragman appears (#18) to save a man from a gang of muggers, when reality has apparently been warped and there is no 'Trinity' of Batman, Superman and Wonder Woman, and apparently never has been. Ragman is joined by a sidekick named Tatters, wearing a green tattered hoodless costume and mask. At first, he is seen confronting an alternate version of Green Arrow, a vigilante in the service of the wealthy who ignores the poor, and later, due to a chronal blast, is seen assuming Batman's position as premier vigilante of Gotham.

=== "Battle for the Cowl" ===
Ragman briefly appears in The Network one-shot for the "Battle for the Cowl" storyline, assisting Cassandra Cain and the Huntress in tracking down a group of hostages around Gotham. After removing the duct tape from the mouth of a gagged woman, Ragman proceeds to counsel her for her apparent drug addiction, telling her that she will never truly be free until she takes hold of her life.

=== "Blackest Night" ===
During the 2009–2010 "Blackest Night" storyline, Nekron completely shuts down Ragman's suit by using the Black Lantern rings to reanimate all the souls attached to his body.

=== Suit of Souls ===
In October 2010, Ragman starred in the one-shot Ragman: Suit of Souls. It was written by Christos Gage and drawn by Stephen Segovia.

Later, Ragman is shown aiding the JLA during their mission into Hell, where he helps Green Arrow defeat the demon Anger.

=== The New 52 ===
In New 52, Rory Regan is the owner of the book and antique shop Rags 'n Tatters who moonlights as the costumed vigilante Ragman.

At his shop, Rory Regan appraised a Celtic amulet as being nearly 500 years old – and worth more than he could pay out. His customer's urgency and insistence in selling the amulet made him suspicious that it had been stolen, but the man insisted that it was just an heirloom. Reluctantly, Rory offered $750, and the man accepted, hurrying away. Despite getting a deal, Rory worried that he would regret the purchase.

Above his shop, Rory was roused from his sleep by a ghostly voice, warning that he was needed. He hurried down stairs to find a pair of thugs attempting to steal an ancient artifact from his safe in the shop. Angry, he followed them in the uniform of Ragman. Rory followed the thieves to their employer, where the remaining cultists intended to use Clayface and the stolen artifact to resurrect Morgaine le Fey.

At the cost of Clayface's discomfort, the Arthurian witch succeeded in returning to life in the present. While too late to prevent her revival, Ragman joined up with Etrigan and Batwoman to fight her, introducing himself as his alias. When Etrigan, desperate to destroy the witch, broke a gas main in the old house the ritual took place in and breathed his fire on it, Ragman, Batwoman, and the now-amnesiac Clayface had barely any time to get out of range of the resultant explosion, but managed it. According to Etrigan, who also survived, it was likely that Morgaine also managed to live through the explosion.

Knowing that Clayface belonged in Arkham Asylum, but that Morgaine could easily break him free on a moment's notice from there, Ragman offered to assuage Batwoman's worries thereof by taking Clayface into his own custody, hoping to help him find his memories. The group parted ways, and Etrigan promised that when next the time came to fight, he would be there.

Rory Regan dumped Clayface into his bathtub, for once thankful for being single and thus not needing to explain himself to anyone. Hungry, he checked his fridge and could not find anything appetizing, but was startled suddenly when Clayface appeared behind him and warned him that Morgaine would kill again.

=== DC Rebirth ===
Ragman returned to DC Comics via DC Rebirth in a six-issue series written by Ray Fawkes and illustrated by Inaki Miranda and colored by Eva de la Cruz, with covers by Guillem March.

== Powers and abilities ==
The original pre-Crisis incarnation of Ragman possesses the physical abilities of his father's friends who died in front of him. This includes: the strength of a circus strongman, the fighting skills and stamina of a heavyweight boxer, and the agility of a world-class acrobat. This version of Ragman wears a costume of ordinary patchwork cloth made by his father.

As established in 1991, the post-Crisis incarnation of Ragman wears a Suit of Souls made up of corrupt souls different Ragmen have encountered over the centuries. This collection of souls lend their power to Ragman, giving him superhuman strength, speed, and stamina, as well as mystical abilities such as gliding on air currents, mentally manipulating his cloak and rags to attack or ensnare others, and being able to sense magical and demonic forces. The suit protects Ragman in a few different ways, healing him from injuries, shielding him from physical and magical attacks, or temporarily dispersing his body as a collection of rags so that attacks simply pass through him. On at least one occasion, the suit protects Ragman from the vacuum of space and provides him air to breathe. If he focuses, Ragman can mentally connect with the souls making up his suit and speak to each one individually to draw on their knowledge. The Suit of Souls automatically materializes around the current Ragman when they are all to answer an act of evil or when the Ragman is in danger and needs power.

Ragman's Suit of Souls is drawn to evil people and hungers for new souls to absorb. Ragman can allow this or attempt to restrain the rags, as the person targeted will die in the process. The suit seems to only absorb souls it deems truly evil and who have faced no justice. The suit would not absorb the soul of supervillain Blue Moon who had already served time in prison, thus not requiring special punishment. The suit also would not attack teenager and hero Billy Batson, deemed "innocent", and thus could not be harmed. Taking a soul adds a new patch of cloth to the suit and increases Ragman's power, though the process of acquiring a new soul causes Ragman to feel ill temporarily. It has been indicated that some souls are released after helping Ragman for long enough time while others leave and gain redemption only after they also understand how their actions in life were harmful. The number of souls Ragman's suit possesses is unknown, but he remarks it is "somewhere over 100".

In the 2006 series Shadowpact, it is said the suit can take on other forms and has done so repeatedly over the years, appearing as a cloak in ancient Egypt, a spear during the Roman Empire, and a dagger in Victorian England. Subsequent stories do not reference this as part of the suit's nature.

In the 2017 Ragman mini-series, a version of Ragman is presented with a different origin and nature. In this version of the character, the suit can absorb the souls of anyone, not just the corrupt. Those souls act as fuel for Ragman's powers and are released when their energy is spent.

== Other versions ==
- An alternate reality variant of Ragman from Earth-13, a reality where magic is the primary force rather than science, appears in Trinity #18.
- An alternate universe variant of Ragman appears in The Multiversity. This version is Ya'akov ben Shimon, an Egyptian slave who abandoned his family to serve the Pharaoh and was subsequently cursed to wander the Earth until he atoned for his actions.

== In other media ==
=== Television ===
Ragman appears in Arrow, portrayed by Joe Dinicol. This version is the sole survivor of the city of Havenrock, which Damien Darhk destroyed with AmerTek's nuclear missiles, and wears ancient rags from the Devarim era. He travels to Star City to seek vengeance for Havenrock by attacking AmerTek executives until Green Arrow convinces him to abandon his quest and become a hero. Following this, Ragman works alongside "Team Arrow" until the episode "Bratva", in which he loses his powers while preventing a nuclear bomb from detonating. Now considering himself a liability, he leaves the team, but assures them that he will return. In the series finale "Fadeout", Ragman returns to Star City to help find the Green Arrow's son, William Clayton.

=== Video games ===
Ragman appears as a character summon in Scribblenauts Unmasked: A DC Comics Adventure.

=== Miscellaneous ===
- Ragman appears in Justice League Unlimited #15.
- Ragman appears in All-New Batman: The Brave and the Bold #14. This version, following his father's death, inherited his family's antique shop and the Ragman suit, using the latter to protect Gotham's Jewish population. Despite being considered a hero by his neighbors and Gotham's other crime-fighters, Ragman begins to feel undervalued and unappreciated, believing he could be doing more and resenting his father for forcing him to remain in their neighborhood. After Batman pursues a supervillain called MacGuffin into Ragman's neighborhood, the latter joins forces with Batman to stop MacGuffin and comes to terms with his feelings towards his father and see the good he had done for his community.
- Ragman appears in the Injustice: Gods Among Us prequel comic as a member of Batman's Insurgency before he is killed by the Spectre.
- Ragman appears in the DC Icons Novel Black Canary: Breaking Silence by Alexandra Monir. This version owns an antique shop called Rags n' Tatters.
