= Felix Faust =

- Felix Faust as depicted in Supergirl vol. 5 #15 (May 2007). Art by Ian Churchill.

Publication information
- Publisher: DC Comics
- First appearance: Justice League of America #10 (March 1962)
- Created by: Gardner Fox; Mike Sekowsky

In-story information
- Species: Homo magi
- Team affiliations: Injustice League; Crime Champions; Secret Society of Super Villains; The Conclave
- Notable aliases: Dekan Drache
- Abilities: Mastery of magic; Extensive knowledge of archery and deception

Felix Faust is a supervillain appearing in American comic books published by DC Comics. The character first appeared in Justice League of America #10 (1962), created by Gardner Fox and Mike Sekowsky. He is depicted as a mystic sorcerer, obsessed with restoring himself to his former might after being robbed of much of his power during a battle with Doctor Mist. While typically empowered by the demonic powers of a trio of brothers known as the "Demons Three", to whom he sold his soul in a faustian deal, the character also frequently targets other magical entities and objects to strengthen his power, putting him frequently at odds with numerous superhero teams.

Faust has been adapted into numerous media outside comics, including television series and video games. Robert Englund, Dee Bradley Baker, and Jon Cryer, among others, have voiced the character in animation. Faust appeared in live-action in the 2014 television series Constantine, portrayed by Mark Margolis.

== Publication history ==
Felix Faust first appears in Justice League of America #10 and was created by Gardner Fox and Mike Sekowsky.

== Fictional character biography ==
=== Earlier history and background ===
Felix Faust lived around approximately 5,000 BC in the legendary African empire of Kor. During this time, Kor was ruled by King Nommo, a prominent wizard and the guardian of the mystical power known as the Flame of Life. Faust, driven by his malevolent ambitions, engaged in a fierce battle with Nommo, seeking to harness the Flame's power for his own purposes. In a decisive move, Nommo absorbed the Flame of Life into himself, defeating Faust and banishing him to another dimension.

In the mid-1920s, a deranged individual and aspiring magician named Dekan Drache inadvertently stumbled upon the dimension where Faust was trapped. Drache, upon opening a portal to the dimension, inadvertently released Faust, who promptly destroyed Drache's soul and took possession of his body. However, upon returning to Earth, Faust discovered that his powers had been significantly diminished. Consumed by an unrelenting desire to restore his abilities, Faust came across the tale of Faust, a man who had purportedly sold his soul to the devil in exchange for supernatural powers. Drawing inspiration from the story's central character, the sorcerer assumed the name Felix Faust and embarked on an eternal quest for mystical knowledge, driven by his insatiable thirst for power.

In the modern era, Faust would eventually have two children named Sebastian and Fauna Faust. Seeking to amass greater power, Faust decided to sacrifice the soul of his eldest son. Originally, during Sebastian's adolescence, Felix intended to sacrifice his soul to the demon Nebiros in exchange for magical abilities. However, the ritual instead bestowed the magical powers onto Sebastian himself. Similarly, Felix attempted a similar ritual with his daughter, but Fauna also gained magical powers instead of being given to Felix. In other tellings of Sebastian Faust's history, it is recounted that his soul was sacrificed as an infant, resulting in the acquisition of magical powers, particularly in the realm of soul magic, which the Faust family is renowned for practicing. Other stories depict Felix Faust as an abusive figure in his family life, extending his mistreatment to his unnamed British wife. After giving birth to Fauna, she fell ill with acute myeloid leukemia. Felix manipulated her into practicing dark magic as a means to alleviate her suffering. Felix intended to turn his entire family into practitioners of dark magic, but his plans were thwarted by the combined efforts of Sebastian's rebellion and a car accident that occurred years earlier, claiming the life of their mother and halting Felix's sinister intentions.

=== Justice League of America ===
Felix Faust first appeared in Justice League of America #10 (March 1962), when he tried to regain some of his lost magical abilities by contacting the Demons Three. These three demons were brothers who ruled the galaxy a billion years ago before being banished by beings known as the Timeless Ones. The Demons Three have tried to return time and again, summoned by Felix Faust and others, their attempts always foiled by the Justice League. Felix Faust tried to summon the power of the Demons Three by possessing three artifacts: the Green Bell of Uthool, the Silver Wheel of Nyorlath, and the Red Jar of Calythos, that had been created by the Demons, and which the Timeless Ones could not destroy or remove from Earth. Faust takes control of the JLA with the Demons' help, who find and defeat the artifact's guardians and bring them to Faust who begins the spell, but Aquaman is able to break the spell by distracting him using his control of fish. The sorcerer is then taken to prison, and the JLA soon after find out about the Demons' escape and re-imprison them.

Over the years, Faust's hunger for magical power proves costly to him. He had bargained his soul away for knowledge on many occasions, only to buy it back later when his acquisitions failed to help him meet his goals; every time, he would end up worse than before. Eventually, he found it difficult to find any mystics willing to purchase his tarnished soul. Finally, he tried to trick Neron into giving him power by offering the pure soul of an innocent girl he murdered in lieu of his own. Unfortunately for him, Neron saw through the ruse and punished Faust by setting the girl's vengeful spirit upon him. For a time, Faust's damned soul languished in a hellish plane for magicians who had abused or ignored the laws of magic.

=== Outsiders vol. 2 (1993-1995) ===
Felix would appear as one of the antagonists in the second Outsiders series; learning of his son's activities in the Outsiders team, he attempts to track him by sending in mystic creatures tasked with bringing Sebastian to him. Initially fearing his father's return, Halo encourages Sebastian to realize his father is not infallible, leading him to counter his spell back at Felix. Having now found him, Felix began working to hunt down his son and manipulate the team. With Fauna as his accomplice, Felix hospitalizes Halo and kidnaps Sebastian. When the team manages to teleport to Felix's hideout using one of Sebastian's artifacts. Escaping, the team learns Sebastian survived the ordeal and Felix's plot includes gathering the Green Bell of Uthool and the Silver Wheel of Nyorlath before being sent off by Sebastian with a divining spell. Meanwhile, Felix manipulates Wylde into working alongside him with promises to undo Sebastian's magic, which transformed him into an anthropomorphic bear. When the team gathers the artifacts, Wylde intervenes and uses the artifacts, resulting in the creation of a dimension where Felix possess god-like power. The Outsiders and Felix battle, the sorcerer using Wylde and Fauna to buy more time before the artifacts can fully grant him power. Eventually, the injured Halo is used by Looker's telepathic abilities to destroy the artifacts, undoing Felix's plan.

=== 52 ===
During the 52 storyline, a voice from within the helm of Doctor Fate speaks to Ralph Dibny and promises to fulfill his desires if he makes certain sacrifices. Ralph journeys with the helm through the afterlives of several cultures, where he is cautioned about the use of magic and sees Felix Faust. He is told about their deals by the voice. The Spectre promises to resurrect his late wife Sue in exchange for Ralph taking vengeance on her murderer, Jean Loring, but Ralph is unable to do so.

In Doctor Fate's tower, Ralph begins the spell to resurrect Sue, puts on the helmet of Fate, and shoots it, revealing Felix Faust, who was posing as Nabu. Faust plans to trade Ralph's soul to Neron in exchange for his own freedom. Ralph reveals that he was aware of Faust's identity for some time, and that the binding spell surrounding the tower is designed to imprison Faust, not to counter any negative effects of the spell. Neron appears and kills Ralph, but the binding spell has already taken effect.

=== One Year Later ===
One year after Infinite Crisis, Faust escapes from the Tower of Fate with the help of Black Adam. Working with Doctor Impossible, Professor Ivo, and Solomon Grundy, Faust poses as Deadman and offers Red Tornado an organic body. Red Tornado accepts, with Faust taking Red Tornado's original body for his own purposes.

As a member of Cheetah's Secret Society of Super Villains, Felix Faust played a part in the creation of Genocide when he used his magic to animate the collected soil samples.

=== The New 52 ===
In The New 52 continuity reboot, Felix Faust is the son of the sorcerer Majika and sold Sebastian's soul in an attempt to garner immortality (unlike the previous versions where he attempted to obtain magical power). In Forever Evil, Faust joins the Secret Society of Super Villains.

=== DC Rebirth ===
In post-DC Rebirth continuity, Faust's backstory is further shown as he is still revealed to be the son of the sorcerer Majika. Around the 1500s, Felix Faust was also an active dark practitioner and master sorcerer and formed an alliance with Vandal Savage. Around this time, he encountered a time-traveling Robin and Superboy.

== Powers and abilities ==
Felix Faust is commonly portrayed as a master sorcerer, possessing extensive knowledge of the supernatural and the ability to manipulate organic matter through his mastery of dark arts. He demonstrates proficiency in various forms of magic, including black magic and soul magic, the latter in which he specializes in alongside his son. These magical abilities enable him to perform a wide range of feats, such as energy manipulation, resurrection, communing with the deceased, teleportation, elemental control, intangibility, illusion casting, telepathy, and scrying. To utilize mystical powers, Felix relies on spell books, scrolls, familiars, or sometimes strikes bargains with demonic entities.

The character also possess a few limitations. Felix Faust's ability to achieve his full potential as a sorcerer has been limited since his encounter with Doctor Mist and his spirit being within the body of occult dabbler and human Dreken Drache. Additionally, he lacks proficiency in hand-to-hand combat. In the New 52 continuity, he was initially regarded as a third-rate wizard who resorted to making Faustian deals to augment his powers, which had the unintended consequence of giving him a ghastly appearance. Furthermore, Felix has limitations in manipulating certain forms of pure magic, being classified as a "dark magician." Any attempt to manipulate such magic poses a risk of death for him, necessitating the use of a medium to channel and utilize it effectively.

== Legacy ==
Throughout his long lifetime, Felix has fathered two children of his own both of British descent:

- Sebastian Faust: Sebastian's soul was bartered to the demon Nebiros, but the power Felix asked for was granted to Sebastian instead. As a result, their father-son relationship has been adversarial. Sebastian has generally acted as a hero, working with the Outsiders and the Sentinels of Magic.
- Fauna Faust: The daughter of Felix Faust and the younger sibling of Sebastian Faust, Fauna followed a darker path than her brother. She would become a member of Kobra Cult's elite strike force, the Strike Force Kobra and secretly work alongside her father as an enemy of both her brother and the second incarnation of the Outsiders superhero team.

== Other versions ==
- Feline Faust appears as Felix Faust's counterpart in the universe of Captain Carrot and His Amazing Zoo Crew!.
- Felix Faust appears in JLA/Avengers #4 as a brainwashed minion of Krona.

== In other media ==
=== Television ===
Felix Faust as he appears in Justice League.

- Felix Faust appears in The Super Powers Team: Galactic Guardians episode "The Case of the Stolen Powers", voiced by Peter Cullen.
- Felix Faust appears in series set in the DC Animated Universe (DCAU), voiced by Robert Englund.
  - Introduced in the Justice League two-part episode "Paradise Lost", this version was originally an archaeology professor who developed an obsession with long-forgotten magic and the dark arts, eventually fashioning himself into a skilled sorcerer. He was subsequently dismissed from his position at the university and took revenge on those who wronged him with his new powers. In the present, he attacks Themyscira and forces Wonder Woman to help him enter Tartarus so he can form an alliance with Hades under the promise of receiving "ultimate knowledge". However, Hades reveals his "knowledge" to be a deadly curse that makes Faust rapidly age until he turns to dust and cast his soul into Tartarus.
  - In the Justice League Unlimited episode "The Balance", Tala recovers Faust's soul, who possesses the Annihilator automaton that was stolen from the Justice League's custody. With it, he overthrows Hades and takes over Tartarus. Faust and the Annihilator are defeated by Hades, Wonder Woman, and Shayera Hol. Afterwards, Hades takes Faust as his prisoner.
- Felix Faust appears in Batman: The Brave and the Bold, voiced by Dee Bradley Baker. This version is a member of the Legion of Doom.
- Felix Faust appears in the Young Justice episode "Misplaced", voiced again by Dee Bradley Baker.
- Felix Faust appears in the Constantine episode "Quid Pro Quo", portrayed by Mark Margolis. This version is an elderly sorcerer embittered by a lifetime of being overshadowed by the greatest magicians of his generation. He bargains with John Constantine and his associate Chas Chandler to return the souls of several innocents, including Chas' daughter, during which Faust compels Chas to give him the souls contained in his body. However, Chas restrains Faust before using a grenade to kill them and free his victims before resurrecting himself.
- Felix Faust appears in Justice League Action, voiced by Jon Cryer. This version possesses the additional abilities of telekinesis, astral projection, and memory erasure, and was initially elderly before summoning the demon Ghast to regain his youth.
- Felix Faust appears in Harley Quinn, voiced by Tony Hale. This version is a member of the Legion of Doom.

=== Film ===
Felix Faust appears in Justice League Dark, voiced by Enrico Colantoni.

=== Video games ===
- Felix Faust appears as a boss in DC Universe Online, voiced by Brian Jepson.
- Felix Faust appears as a playable character in Lego DC Super-Villains.

=== Miscellaneous ===
- The DCAU incarnation of Felix Faust appears in Justice League Adventures #33.
- The DCAU incarnation of Felix Faust appears in issue #26 of the Justice League Unlimited tie-in comic.
- Felix Faust appears in Smallville Season 11: Olympus. This version was a member of Shadowpact during World War II before betraying them to receive eternal youth from Hades. In the present, he joins Hades in attacking the Department of Extranormal Operations, only to be stopped and dragged to Tartarus by Wonder Woman.
