= Day of Judgment (comics) =

DC comic storyline

- Cover of Day of Judgment #5 (November 1999). Pencils by Matthew Dow Smith and inks by Steve Mitchell.
- Publisher: DC Comics
- Publication date: November 1999
- Genre: Superhero; Crossover
Title(s)
Day of Judgment #1-5
Anarky (vol. 2) #7
Aquaman (vol. 5) #61
Azrael: Agent of the Bat #58
Batman: Day of Judgment #1
Day of Judgment Secret Files and Origins #1
Green Lantern (vol. 3) #118
Hourman #8
Impulse #54 and 61
JLA #6-7 and 35
Martian Manhunter (vol. 2) #12
Stars and S.T.R.I.P.E. #4
Superboy #68
Supergirl (vol. 4) #38
Superman: The Man of Tomorrow #15
The Titans #9
Young Justice #14
JLA: Paradise Lost #1-3
- Main character(s): The Spectre; Hal Jordan; The Sentinels of Magic; Etrigan the Demon; Asmodel; Neron

Creative team
- Writer: Geoff Johns
- Penciller(s): Matthew Dow Smith, Christopher Jones (breakdowns)
- Inker: Steve Mitchell
- Letterer: Comicraft
- Colorist: James Sinclair
- Editor: Kevin Dooley

Day of Judgment is a multi-title DC Comics miniseries and crossover storyline during the autumn of 1999. The limited series was written by Geoff Johns, with art by Matthew Dow Smith.

The main storyline for the series dealt with the Spectre (whose previous host, Jim Corrigan, had left him when he ascended into Heaven) being bonded to a new host, in the form of the then-deceased Hal Jordan.

== Storyline ==
Endeavoring to cause chaos on Earth, as well as to defeat his enemy and rival demon Neron, Etrigan the Demon arranges for the now-hostless Spectre-Force to be bonded to the renegade King-Angel Asmodel, who uses the Spectre's power to freeze Hell and release hordes of demons on Earth. This action also results in villains, such as the Enchantress, being released. Earth's conventional heroes are powerless against Asmodel's onslaught. With the regular heroes having fallen, it is up to the newly-formed Sentinels of Magic - consisting of Doctor Occult, Zatanna, the Phantom Stranger, Madame Xanadu, Deadman, Raven, Ragman, Sentinel and Sebastian Faust - to stand against the Spectre/Asmodel.

To vanquish Asmodel, the Sentinels and the other heroes divide into three groups: a 'home front' to defend Earth, a team to reignite the fires of Hell and a team to search for Jim Corrigan in Heaven and convince him to become the Spectre again. Although the team who is at Hell falls into the River Styx after a fight with Cerberus - being rescued only by the soulless Faust, who is unaffected by the visions that plague his comrades - and the team who is in Heaven fails to recruit Corrigan to their cause, they are directed by the archangel Michael to Purgatory, where a soul in search of redemption may aid them. Selecting Hal Jordan, who is feeling guilty over his actions as Parallax, as the best candidate for the Spectre-Force's new host, the Sentinels bring him to Earth with the aid of other deceased heroes.

While Captain Marvel - who possesses a "pure" soul - takes the Spear of Destiny to aid in the fight, Faust sacrifices his newly regained soul - the demon who had previously been promised his soul having already been defeated - to restore the fires of Hell by killing the Enchantress. With Marvel having weakened the Spectre, Hal attempts to merge with the Spirit of Vengeance, leading to a three-way battle between himself, Asmodel and Neron - who had hidden inside Superman to gain access to the mortal plane - that is interrupted by the Spectre-Force. At first demanding to know why it should accept any of them as hosts, the Spectre-Force finally chooses Hal when he states that being the Spectre would be an appropriate punishment for what he had done as Parallax. As a result of this choice, Neron is punished by his fellow demon-lords for using Hell's power for his own pleasure by having his royal status stripped from him and being demoted to a Rhyming Demon - which had been Etrigan's plan all along.

The crossover event resulted in the creation of the Sentinels of Magic and Hal Jordan becoming the Spectre's new host for a time.

Certain aspects of this event were later dealt with in Green Lantern: Rebirth (involving Hal Jordan being released from the Spectre-Force) and Day of Vengeance (wherein the again-hostless Spectre-Force once more runs amok on Earth).
