= Doctor Occult =

DC Comics superhero

Publication information
- Publisher: DC Comics
- First appearance: New Fun #6 (October 1935)
- Created by: Jerry Siegel; Joe Shuster

In-story information
- Alter ego: Richard Occult
- Team affiliations: Justice Society of America; All-Star Squadron; Sentinels of Magic; The Trenchcoat Brigade; Justice League; Justice Society Dark
- Notable aliases: Doctor Mystic
- Abilities: Expert user of magic; Spell casting; Summoning; Scrying; Power siphoning; Conjuration; Magical amplification; Magical channeling; Eldritch blasts; Energy transference; Force field generation; Extensive knowledge of the occult; Expert tactician; Expert detective; Exorcism; Enchantments; Elemental control; Atmokinesis; Chronokinesis; Matter transmutation; Necromancy; Teleportation; Astral projection; Hypnosis; Illusion creation; Telepathy; Telekinesis

Doctor Occult (Richard Occult, sometimes nicknamed the Ghost Detective, and one time referred to as Doctor Mystic) is a superhero appearing in American comic books published by DC Comics. Created by Jerry Siegel and Joe Shuster (the creators of Superman), Doctor Occult is an occult detective, private investigator and magic user who specializes in cases involving the supernatural.

The character first appeared in 1935 during the Platinum Age of Comic Books. He was published by National Comics Publications and Centaur Publications within anthology titles. Doctor Occult is the earliest recurring, originally featured fictional character still used in the DC Universe. He is sometimes affiliated with the All-Star Squadron and has appeared in paranormal-related stories by DC and Vertigo Comics titles.

== Publication history ==
=== Mainstream version ===
==== Golden Age titles ====
Doctor Occult first appeared in the sixth issue of the anthology comic books series New Fun in October 1935. (New Fun was retitled More Fun beginning with issue #7 and again to More Fun Comics with issue #20.) The character was credited to "Leger and Reuths" – partial anagrams of Siegel and Shuster's surnames. However, Siegel and Shuster abandoned the character to focus instead on their next creation, Superman.

Occult was depicted as a supernatural detective with a look and mannerisms inspired by Sam Spade, and who used magic in his investigations. Supporting characters in the strip included his female partner Rose Psychic and Occult's unnamed butler. Writers such as Les Daniels have cited the character as a prototype of Superman.

Renamed as "Dr. Mystic", Occult also appeared in Centaur Publications' The Comics Magazine #1 (May 1936), with that story continuing in DC's More Fun Comics #14-17. The story presented him as being capable of flight and wearing a long cape, technically making him the first cape-wearing comic character. Doctor Occult's last Golden Age appearance was in More Fun Comics #32 in 1938.

==== Bronze Age revival ====
After years of obscurity, the character was revived in the 1980s, appearing in issues of All-Star Squadron, Swamp Thing, and Crisis on Infinite Earths.

==== Modern Age revivals ====
The character was given a proper origin story in Secret Origins #17 (1987). He later appeared in comics such as Neil Gaiman's The Books of Magic (1991), The Trenchcoat Brigade (alongside Mister E, the Phantom Stranger, and John Constantine) (1999), and "Day of Judgement" (1999) as part of the Sentinels of Magic.

=== Reboot ===
In The New 52 continuity reboot, Doctor Occult appears in Justice League Dark, Constantine, Secret Six, and The Books of Magic series.

== Fictional character biography ==
The fictional character's origin was revealed in Secret Origins (vol. 2) #17. (August 1987) by E. Nelson Bridwell and Roy Thomas. They depicted him and a woman (the future Rose Psychic) being kidnapped by a demonic cult to be sacrificed but were rescued by a shadowy group of magicians called "The Seven". Recognizing that both Occult and Psychic had magical potential, the Seven took them away for a number of years to study and learn the mystic arts.

Thirty-six years later, Doctor Occult opened up his own detective agency, specializing in crimes of a mystical nature and during World War II he joined the All-Star Squadron. At some point, Occult and Rose were fused into one being; the exact circumstances vary between stories. Occult's use of sorcery has largely negated his body's aging process, causing him to appear middle-aged despite being born in the late 1800s.

In 1991, Neil Gaiman brought the character back into the spotlight with a prominent supporting role in The Books of Magic. In the third issue he acts as Tim Hunter's guide to otherworlds. When visiting Faerie, he takes the form of Rose Psychic. Hunter's other guides are Mister E, the Phantom Stranger, and John Constantine, the last of whom sarcastically nicknames the group the Trenchcoat Brigade. The four would return later at a summons from Hunter, who, having lost everything at that point, needs a new direction in life.

In Day of Judgment, Occult joins the Sentinels of Magic, a group created to prevent artifacts such as the Spear of Destiny from falling into the wrong hands.

Occult appears as a main character in Reign in Hell, where he enters Hell to find and release the soul of Rose Psychic.

In The New 52, Occult is depicted as caretaker of the House of Secrets. In the series Justice League Unlimited (vol. 2), he joins the expanded Justice League.

In the series New History of the DC Universe, it is revealed that Doctor Occult was a member of the Justice Society Dark.

== Powers and abilities ==
Doctor Occult has the powers of astral projection, hypnosis, illusion creating, and telekinesis. He wields a powerful talisman, a sphere or disc with a black and white pattern, called the Mystic Symbol of the Seven. It grants him the powers of clairvoyance, exorcism, deflection, and force field projection.

== Other versions ==
Doctor Occult appears in comic books outside of the mainstream DC Universe in what is referred to as the multiverse. Many are adaptation tie-ins, including Justice League Unlimited #14, Batman: The Brave and the Bold #9, and Injustice: Gods Among Us: Year 3 Annual #1.

Occult also appears in issue #2 of the Elseworlds comic series Superman & Batman: Generations II.

== In other media ==
- Doctor Occult appears as a non-playable character in DC Universe Online.
- Doctor Occult appears as a character summon in Scribblenauts Unmasked: A DC Comics Adventure.

== Reception ==
Bill Reed of Comic Book Resources praised the character saying that DC Comics could portray more of him despite him not having the staying power as other supernatural heroes such as Phantom Stranger or John Constantine.
