= Blue Devil (DC Comics) =

DC Comics superhero

- Cover art for Shadowpact #20 by Mario Alberti.

Publication information
- Publisher: DC Comics
- First appearance: Fury of Firestorm #24 (June 1984)
- Created by: Dan Mishkin (character); Gary Cohn (character and visual); Paris Cullins (belt design)

In-story information
- Full name: Daniel Patrick Cassidy
- Species: Metahuman
- Team affiliations: Shadowpact; Justice Society of America; Sentinels of Magic; Justice League Dark; Justice League
- Abilities: Superhuman strength, durability, agility, and senses; Enhanced vision and hearing; Master martial artist and hand-to-hand combatant; Expert acrobat; Nigh-invulnerability; Healing factor; Utilizes the Trident of Lucifer; Can find demons on Earth and banish them to Hell
Blue Devil
- Blue Devil #1 (June 1984), cover art by Paris Cullins.
Publication information
- Publisher: DC Comics
- Schedule: monthly
- Format: Ongoing series
- Genre: Superhero
- Publication date: June 1984 – Dec. 1986
- No. of issues: 31 issues & 1 annual
- Main character: Daniel Cassidy

Blue Devil (Daniel Patrick Cassidy) is a superhero appearing in American comic books published by DC Comics. He first appeared in a preview insert published in Fury of Firestorm #24 (June 1984), followed by Blue Devil #1, also cover dated June 1984. He was created by Dan Mishkin, Gary Cohn, and Paris Cullins. The Blue Devil comic book ran for 31 issues and one annual. Blue Devil later appeared as a regular character in Shadowpact, which ran for 25 issues.

Dan Cassidy was working as a stuntman and special effects specialist in Hollywood when he became permanently bonded to an exoskeleton suit created for a film. This unnatural fusion of magic and technology caused him to experience unusual events and draw the attention of otherworldly beings. Horrified at the prospect of being stuck in the suit, Cassidy sought ways to separate himself from it, becoming a reluctant superhero along the way. Cassidy was eventually transformed into an actual demon after making a deal with the demon Neron. Regretting the deal, Blue Devil decided to fight occult evil, often alongside the other members of Shadowpact.

Cassidy's original trident was a mechanical device that he designed himself, but, after being turned into an actual demon, he acquired the magical "Trident of Lucifer" to help combat demons.

Blue Devil has appeared in the animated series Justice League Unlimited and Young Justice as well as the live-action DC Universe series Swamp Thing, in which he was portrayed by Ian Ziering.

== Concept and creation ==
Gary Cohn recounted how he and writing partner Dan Mishkin created Blue Devil:

Our editor for a number of things we were doing was a guy named Dave Manak. At this point, Dan [Mishkin] was living in Michigan and I was in New York. I was the point guy who went to the DC office once a week and schmoozed the editors. One day Manak says, "Ditko's been hanging around the office and he really wants something to do. Do you think you and Dan can come up for something for him?" I went home and I called Dan and told him about this, and we were both very excited. Ditko was the guy who created Spider-Man and Dr. Strange, and we were gaga for Ditko! ... We decided to do something that takes something from every Marvel character we ever loved. Let's take Iron Man, the guy in the costume; the Thing, the tragedy of the guy stuck in a shape he didn't want; and a light-hearted, bouncy approach and a character who was going to move like Spider-Man. ... And we wanted something like the Green Goblin. How about Blue Devil? We called him that because Dan's wife is from North Carolina and he was a Blue Devils fan. Then we started creating Blue Devil and thinking, "Ditko is going to love this!" We created this great proposal, and it was everything that we knew was going to set Ditko's light on high beam. We took it in to Manak and he gave it to Ditko. Ditko looked at it and said, "I'll do it if I have to, but this is really not my kind of stuff at all".

However, Manak liked the proposal and suggested that they show it to artist Paris Cullins, for whom Cohn had written his first published comics story. Cullins was immediately enthusiastic, and Blue Devil was given his own series. As Cullins recalled, the character came about through "a little story in House of Mystery that was supposed to be, and here's the truth for that, it was originally designed a short story for Steve Ditko and it was supposed to be like a superhero story, but a monster superhero story, but a short one. He said, 'No.' He didn't want to do it and then they asked me."

The character was scheduled to debut in DC's horror anthology Tales of the Unexpected, for which Manak was the chief editor, but plans were changed when Manak became editor of DC's Special Projects Division and Blue Devil was transferred to editor Len Wein. Wein decided that Blue Devil would work better with a humorous tone that fit Cullins' bold artwork. He asked Cohn and Mishkin to expand the story to 23 pages and add more colorful supporting characters. Cohn responded by building a series bible and plotting out six major storylines for an ongoing title.

Blue Devil's costume and general visual appearance were designed by Cohn, while Cullins came up with the belt design.

== Publication history ==
After the preview story was completed, there was a one year gap before Cullins was commissioned to complete issue 1, allowing him time to develop the visual style of the series.

Co-writer Gary Cohn recounted that "the first six issues [of Blue Devil], I was living in Brooklyn and Paris [Cullins] was living in Philly. Paris was kind of a vagabond spirit. He would show up in New York on the train with his sketchbook, his artist satchel, and his toothbrush, and he would come to my place and stay for three or four days. We would spend the whole time creating plots and visuals as we went, laughing hysterically. We were constantly calling Dan [Mishkin]. It was not the stiff process of writing a script, giving it to the artist, or even writing a plot and giving it to an artist. It was a very organic collaboration". Following issue #6, Cullins left the series, and both Mishkin and Cohn felt that none of the succeeding artists were able to capture the combination of thrills and comedy that they wanted the series to have.

Editor Alan Gold recalled that "usually Gary comes up with a plot. This he sends to Dan, who tinkers a bit, and when they're both sure of what they have, they send a copy to me. When I like it, too, Gary writes the full script...most of the action sequences are developed by Paris and Gary...if it's a masterpiece that will live through the ages, I hand it over to Paris and bid him go draw, draw, draw!"

Cullins completed the covers for the series's first five issues before the scripts were finalized, leading to continuity errors regarding the presence and appearance of Blue Devil's signature trident weapon.

The first Blue Devil series was intentionally written as a humorous and light-hearted comic book story, but this light-hearted style was discarded with later appearances of the character.

== Fictional character biography ==
Daniel Cassidy is a special effects wizard and stuntman hired to create and play the title character in the movie Blue Devil, leading him to create a full-body costume with a hidden powered exoskeleton and built-in special-effects devices. When two of his co-stars accidentally free a demon named Nebiros, Cassidy uses his costume's abilities to drive the demon back, but is blasted by mystical energy. After the fight, Cassidy discovers that the blast grafted the Blue Devil costume to his body.

Cassidy quickly finds himself embroiled in adventures and conflicts with supervillains, as his newfound status has turned him into a "weirdness magnet". After failing to find a way to remove his costume, Cassidy starts to enjoy his new lifestyle, and becomes more comfortable as a superhero, even accepting a place in the Justice League of America. He gains a sidekick when Eddie Bloomberg, his former gofer and devoted fan, designs a suit similar to his own and becomes Kid Devil. Eventually, he moves into "The House of Weirdness" with Cain as his superintendent.

=== Blue Demon and later alliances ===
During the Underworld Unleashed storyline, Blue Devil is approached by the demon Neron, who is known for offering Faustian bargains to heroes and villains alike. Neron offers Cassidy, who is increasingly bored with superheroics, the chance to finally be the famous actor he had always wanted to be. As payment, Neron sends Cassidy to destroy an unmanned electrical substation in the desert. Believing it to be a relatively harmless act, having checked that nobody was working that night and a relay station would kick in to carry the load, Blue Devil complies and inadvertently causes the death of Marla Bloom, Eddie Bloomberg's aunt, as the resulting power outage causes a crash that kills her. The story of his personal loss is enough to attract several movie offers.

Blaming Neron for Marla's death, Cassidy foils the demon's short-term plans but dies in the process. Cassidy is quickly revived, but this time as a true demon, and is unable to set foot on consecrated ground without bursting into flame.

Blue Devil joins the Justice League again until his second death at the hands of Mist, who showers him with holy water. Blue Devil is resurrected again by Sebastian Faust, who hopes to gain his assistance restarting the fires of Hell during the Day of Judgment storyline. Blue Devil has a chance to confront Nebiros and kills him with Firestorm's help.

Blue Devil joins the Sentinels of Magic and begins an uneasy partnership with Faust. Faust restores Blue Devil's freedom by restoring his last missing bone. Blue Devil sacrifices his life fighting Hermes Trismegistus, but as a true devil he returns to life again. He is tasked to roam the Earth with Lucifer's Trident, sending escaped demons back to Hell.

=== One Year Later ===
Blue Devil is employed as a bouncer at the Oblivion Bar, an interdimensional place for magical beings. During the events of Day of Vengeance, Blue Devil is recruited into Shadowpact to battle the Spectre. Feeling necessary for the first time in a long time, Blue Devil devotes himself to the team. One of their goals is to help look over the wild magic of the "Tenth Age", a direct result of the events of Day of Vengeance.

Following the events of Day of Vengeance, Blue Devil and Shadowpact spend a year trapped in Riverrock, Wyoming, and are presumed dead. In Riverrock, Blue Devil encounters Jack of Fire, a demon who claims to be his brother. The Enchantress is forced to steal a year of life out of every Shadowpact member and Riverrock resident to shatter the barrier around Riverrock.

After escaping, Blue Devil confronts Kid Devil, who Neron transformed into a demonic metahuman. When questioned about his involvement in Marla's death, Blue Devil is forced to admit that his actions were what caused her death. Due to the terms of his deal with Neron, that he would become Neron's eternal servant on his 20th birthday should he lose his trust in Blue Devil, Kid Devil realizes that he is now damned, having lost all trust in Blue Devil following his confession.

To add further misery to his condition, Blue Devil is demoted to the rank of a Rhyming Demon and stuck in Hell. His new position results in the angel Zauriel being sent to confront him. His demotion is explained as the paradoxical condition of his being both a hero and a demon: being famous and loved by everyone, he makes Hell a glamorous place, spurring weak minds to attain his glamour by selling their souls to Hell. Zauriel, on behalf of his good faith, takes Blue Devil's place in Shadowpact. Blue Devil confronts Jack of Fire and reclaims his soul, but loses Lucifer's trident and his demon form.

Jack of Fire allies with a seemingly all-powerful Sun God, but plots to betray him in retaliation for his harsh treatment and to lead an army of demons on Earth. Cassidy sets off to fight his brother, who refuses. Instead, after a brief confrontation, acknowledging that the Sun God will eventually kill him for his betrayal, Jack commits suicide in front of Cassidy, naming him inheritor of all his powers and demonic status without forfeiting his soul.

During the Reign in Hell storyline, Blue Devil convinces Zatanna and Sargon the Sorcerer to take him to Hell and accompany him as to make a deal with Satanus against Neron. Blue Devil pleads to be incorporated into Satanus' attack force in hopes of regaining his humanity. Inadvertently, he brags about being capable of handling Etrigan, who is causing damage to Satanus' forces; Satanus takes heed of this and teleports him to do battle with Etrigan. After defeating Blue Devil, Etrigan steals the remains of his humanity.

Due to the effects of a magical drug Satanus released in Hell, Blue Devil regains his humanity, but does not regain his soul. Etrigan offers him his soul back, warning him that the drug only works on pureblood demons and that regaining his soul would mean permanently returning to his demon form.

=== The New 52 ===
In The New 52 rebooted DC's continuity, Blue Devil is reintroduced when he breaks up a drug deal and runs into Black Lightning, who is also there to bust the deal. They both state that they are trying to take down crime lord Tobias Whale, but Black Lightning does not believe Blue Devil. A fight ensues, but Blue Devil quickly gets the better of Black Lightning and tries to make him listen, when he is interrupted by the LAPD, who are ready to open fire. Black Lightning takes that opportunity to run off and Blue Devil manages to escape as well.

Blue Devil makes a minor appearance in the storyline "Absolute Power", where he and other magical beings take refuge in the Oblivion Bar to avoid the chaos happening in the real world. When the Amazo android Jadestone attacks the Oblivion Bar, he is fended off by Blue Devil and the others.

== Powers and abilities ==
Before he became Blue Devil, Dan Cassidy was a highly trained martial artist and acrobat. His costume included kevlar body armor, visual and auditory amplifiers, radio gear, mini-gills allowing underwater breathing, and servo-motors which increased his strength at least twentyfold. After being grafted to Cassidy's body the costume became organic and gained the ability to self-repair at an extremely fast rate. Cassidy's abilities seem to have been changed little by his transformation into an actual demon. Due to the bizarre interaction of magic and technology in his transformed suit, it was theorized that Blue Devil was a "Weirdness Magnet."

In his current incarnation, Blue Devil still possesses some degree of superhuman strength, capable of going toe-to-toe with beings like Eclipso, and knocking out a power-drunk Enchantress in one punch. He is also remarkably resistant to physical damage, evidenced when Eclipso threw him a distance of approximately 500 feet upwards, he did not even require time to recover before getting up and heading back into the fight.

Originally, Blue Devil wielded a trident of his own design which included, among other things, rocket engines capable of carrying two people at high speeds. He now carries the Trident of Lucifer, which allows him to find demons on Earth and banish them to Hell. During a battle with Eclipso and the Spectre the trident was thrown into the ocean; it was recovered shortly after by Aquaman who returned it to Cassidy, and much later given to Jack of Fire.

Briefly resuming his human body with a more powerful exosuit, Cassidy is given back his trident and demonic powers by Jack of Fire, but as a "demon with a soul".

Dan's apartment in Metropolis connects to California via a closet that opens into Cain's House of Mystery. By crossing through the house, he can travel from the East Coast to the West Coast in moments.

== Other versions ==
An alternate universe version of Blue Devil makes a cameo appearance in Kingdom Come.

== In other media ==
=== Television ===
- Blue Devil makes non-speaking appearances in Justice League Unlimited.
- Blue Devil appears in Young Justice, voiced by Troy Baker. This version is an associate of the Justice League in the first two seasons before joining them in the third. In the fourth season, he serves as the "den mother" of the League's sub-groups, the Team and the Outsiders.
- Daniel Cassidy appears in Swamp Thing, portrayed by Ian Ziering. This version made a deal with the Phantom Stranger that leaves him trapped in Marais, Louisiana, with him bursting into flame if he attempts to leave. He eventually becomes Blue Devil to save Abby Arcane and Liz Tremayne from Conclave's security team and leaves Marais afterwards.

=== Film ===
Blue Devil appears in Justice League: Crisis on Infinite Earths.

=== Video games ===
Blue Devil appears as a character summon in Scribblenauts Unmasked: A DC Comics Adventure.

=== Miscellaneous ===
- Blue Devil makes a cameo appearance in Teen Titans Go! #23.
- Blue Devil appears in issue #25 of the Justice League Unlimited tie-in comic.

=== Merchandise ===
Blue Devil received a figure in the DC Universe Classics line.
