= List of Showcase Presents publications =

The following are collected volumes in the Showcase Presents line from DC Comics. All titles begin with the phrase Showcase Presents. Note that when a volume reprints issues which were themselves reprints (e.g., 80-Page Giant specials), only the cover art is included.

== Published Showcase Presents volumes ==
Title	Volume	Years covered	Issues collected	Pages	ISBN	Date published
Adam Strange	Vol. 1	1958–1963	Adam Strange stories from: Showcase #17–19; Mystery in Space #53–84	512	1-4012-1313-8	August 2007
All-Star Comics	Vol. 1	1976–1979	All-Star Comics #58–74; JSA stories from: Adventure Comics #461–466	448	1-4012-3303-1	September 2011
All-Star Squadron	Vol. 1	1981–1983	Justice League of America #193, All-Star Squadron #1–18, All-Star Squadron Annual #1	528	1-4012-3436-4	April 2012
Ambush Bug	Vol. 1	1982–1992	Ambush Bug stories from: DC Comics Presents #52, 59, 81; Supergirl #16; Action Comics #560, 563, 565; Ambush Bug #1–4; Ambush Bug Stocking Stuffer; Son of Ambush Bug #1–6; Secret Origins (vol. 2) #48; Ambush Bug Nothing Special	488	978-1-4012-2180-5	March 2009
Amethyst, Princess of Gemworld	Vol. 1	1983–1985	preview story from Legion of Super-Heroes #298, Amethyst, Princess of Gemworld #1–12, Amethyst Annual #1, DC Comics Presents #63, Amethyst #1–11	648	1-4012-3677-4	September 2012
Aquaman	Vol. 1	1959–1962	Aquaman stories from: Adventure Comics #260–280, 282, 284; Aquaman #1–6; Superman's Girl Friend, Lois Lane #12; Showcase #30–33; Detective Comics #293–300; Superman's Pal Jimmy Olsen #55; World's Finest Comics #125–129	544	1-4012-1363-4	February 2007
Aquaman	Vol. 2	1962–1965	Aquaman stories from: Aquaman #7–23; World's Finest Comics #130–133, 135, 137, 139; The Brave and the Bold #51	528	1-4012-1712-5	January 2008
Aquaman	Vol. 3	1965–1968	Aquaman stories from: Aquaman #24–39; The Brave and the Bold #73; Superman's Pal Jimmy Olsen #115	448	1-4012-2181-5	February 2009
Atom	Vol. 1	1961–1965	Atom stories from: Showcase #34–36; The Atom #1–17	528	1-4012-1363-4	June 2007
Atom	Vol. 2	1965–1968	The Atom #18–38	528	1-4012-1363-4	August 2008
Batgirl	Vol. 1	1967–1975	Batgirl stories from: Detective Comics #359, 363, 369, 371, 384–385, 388–389, 392–393, 396–397, 400–401, 404–424; Batman #197, 214; Adventure Comics #381; World's Finest Comics #169, 176; The Brave and the Bold #78; Justice League of America #60; Superman #268, 279; The Superman Family #171	520	1-4012-1367-7	July 2007
Bat Lash	Vol. 1	1968–1982	Bat Lash stories from: Showcase #76; Bat Lash #1–7; DC Special Series #16; Jonah Hex #49, 51–52	240	1-4012-2295-1	July 2009
Batman	Vol. 1	1964–1965	Batman stories from: Detective Comics #327–342; Batman #164–174	552	1-4012-1086-4	August 2006
Batman	Vol. 2	1965–1966	Batman stories from: Detective Comics #343–358; Batman #175–188	512	1-4012-1362-6	June 2007
Batman	Vol. 3	1967–1968	Batman stories from: Detective Comics #359–375; Batman #189–201	552	1-4012-1719-2	June 2008
Batman	Vol. 4	1968–1969	Batman stories from: Detective Comics #376–390; Batman #202–215	520	1-4012-2314-1	July 2009
Batman	Vol. 5	1969–1971	Batman stories from: Detective Comics #391–407; Batman #216–228	448	1-4012-3236-1	November 2011
Batman	Vol. 6	1971–1972	Batman stories from: Detective Comics #408–426; Batman #229–244	584	1401251536	January 2016
Batman and the Outsiders	Vol. 1	1983–1985	Batman and the Outsiders #1–19, Annual #1; New Teen Titans #37 preview story from The Brave and the Bold #200	552	1-4012-1546-7	September 2007
Blackhawk	Vol. 1	1957–1958	Blackhawk #108–127	512	1-4012-1983-7	October 2008
Blue Beetle	Vol. 1	1986–1988	Blue Beetle #1–24; Secret Origins (vol. 2) #2	590	978-1-4012-5147-5	January 2015
Booster Gold	Vol. 1	1986–1988	Booster Gold #1–25; Action Comics #594	624	1-4012-1655-2	March 2008
The Brave and the Bold: The Batman Team-Ups	Vol. 1	1965–1969	The Brave and the Bold #59, 64, 67–71, 74–87	528	1-4012-1209-3	January 2007
The Brave and the Bold: The Batman Team-Ups	Vol. 2	1970–1973	The Brave and the Bold #88–108	528	1-4012-1675-7	December 2007; out of print
The Brave and the Bold: The Batman Team-Ups	Vol. 3	1973–1977	The Brave and the Bold #109–134	520	1-4012-1985-3	December 2008
Captain Carrot and His Amazing Zoo Crew!	Vol. 1	1982–1983	Captain Carrot and His Amazing Zoo Crew! #1–20 preview story from New Teen Titans #16; Captain Carrot and His Amazing Zoo Crew! in The Oz-Wonderland War #1–3	668	1-4012-1547-5	September 2014
Challengers of the Unknown	Vol. 1	1957–1960	Showcase #6, 7, 11–12; Challengers of the Unknown #1–17	540	1-4012-1087-2	September 2006
Challengers of the Unknown	Vol. 2	1961–1964	Challengers of the Unknown #18–37	528	1-4012-1725-7	April 2008
DC Comics Presents: The Superman Team-Ups	Vol. 1	1978–1980	DC Comics Presents #1–26	512	1-4012-2535-7	November 2009
DC Comics Presents: The Superman Team-Ups	Vol. 2	1980–1982	DC Comics Presents #27–50 and Annual #1	568	1-4012-4048-8	July 2013
Doc Savage	Vol. 1	1975	Marvel Comics black and white Doc Savage magazine #1–8	448	1-4012-3125-X	July 2011
Dial H for Hero	Vol. 1	1966–1968	Dial H for Hero stories from: House of Mystery #156–173	288	1-4012-2648-5	April 2010
Doom Patrol	Vol. 1	1963–1965	Doom Patrol stories from: My Greatest Adventure #80–85; Doom Patrol #86–101	520	1-4012-2182-3	April 2009
Doom Patrol	Vol. 2	1966–1968	Doom Patrol #102–121	511	1-4012-2770-8	August 2010
Eclipso	Vol. 1	1963–1966	Eclipso stories from: House of Secrets #61–80	296	1-4012-2315-X	August 2009
Elongated Man	Vol. 1	1960–1968	Elongated Man stories from: The Flash #112, 115, 119, 124, 130, 134, 138; Detective Comics #327–371	560	1-4012-1042-2	July 2006
Enemy Ace	Vol. 1	1965–1982	Enemy Ace stories from: Our Army at War #151, 153, 155; Showcase #57–58; Star-Spangled War Stories #138–152, 158, 181–183, 200; Detective Comics #404; Men of War #1–3, 8–10, 12–14, 19–20; The Unknown Soldier #252–253, 260–261, 265–267; DC Special #26 (cover art)	552	1-4012-1721-4	February 2008
The Flash	Vol. 1	1949, 1956–1961	Silver Age Flash stories from: Showcase #4, 8, 13, 14; The Flash #105–119; Golden Age Flash story from Flash Comics #104	512	1-4012-1327-8	May 2007
The Flash	Vol. 2	1961–1963	The Flash #120–140	552	1-4012-1805-9	June 2008
The Flash	Vol. 3	1963–1966	The Flash #141–161	520	978-1-4012-2297-0	August 2009
The Flash	Vol. 4	1966–1968	The Flash #162–184	528	1-4012-3679-0	October 2012
Ghosts	Vol. 1	1971–1973	Ghosts #1–18	512	1-4012-3317-1	February 2012
The Great Disaster featuring the Atomic Knights	Vol. 1	1960–1983	Great Disaster stories from: Kamandi, the Last Boy on Earth #43–46; Superman #295; The Amazing World of DC Comics #12; Atomic Knights stories from: Strange Adventures #117, 120, 123, 126, 129, 132, 135, 138, 141, 144, 147, 150, 153, 156, 160; DC Comics Presents #57; "The Day After Doomsday" stories from: Weird War Tales #22–23, 30, 32, 40, 42–44, 46–49, 51–53, 64, 68–69, 123; House of Mystery #318; House of Secrets #86, 95, 97; The Unexpected #215, 221; Hercules Unbound #1–10; 1st Issue Special #1	576	1-4012-1560-2	June 2014
Green Arrow	Vol. 1	1958–1969	Green Arrow stories from: Adventure Comics #250–269; The Brave and the Bold #50, 71, 85; Justice League of America #4; World's Finest Comics #95–140	528	1-4012-0785-5	January 2006
Green Lantern	Vol. 1	1959–1962	Showcase #22–24; Green Lantern #1–17	528	1-4012-0759-6	October 2005; new printing in November 2010
Green Lantern	Vol. 2	1963–1965	Green Lantern #18–38	552	1-4012-1264-6	February 2007
Green Lantern	Vol. 3	1965–1968	Green Lantern #39–59	528	1-4012-1792-3	May 2008
Green Lantern	Vol. 4	1968–1970	Green Lantern #60–75	392	1-4012-2278-1	June 2009
Green Lantern	Vol. 5	1970–1977	Green Lantern/Green Arrow stories from: Green Lantern #76–89; The Flash #217–219; Green Lantern stories from: The Flash #220–221, 223–224, 226–228, 230–231, 233–234, 237–238, 240–243, 245–246	496	1-4012-3023-7	April 2011
Haunted Tank	Vol. 1	1961–1965	Haunted Tank stories from: G.I. Combat #87–119; The Brave and the Bold #52; Our Army at War #155	560	1-4012-0789-8	May 2006; out of print
Haunted Tank	Vol. 2	1966–1973	Haunted Tank stories from G.I. Combat #120–157	560	978-1-4012-1793-8	June 2008
Hawkman	Vol. 1	1961–1965	Hawkman stories from: The Brave and the Bold #34–36, 42–44, and 51; The Atom #7; Mystery in Space #87–90; Hawkman #1–11	560	1-4012-1280-8	March 2007
Hawkman	Vol. 2	1965–1969	Hawkman stories from: Hawkman #12–27; The Atom #31; The Atom and Hawkman #39–45; The Brave and the Bold #70	560	978-1-4012-1817-1	August 2008
House of Mystery	Vol. 1	1968–1971	House of Mystery #174–194	552	1-4012-0786-3	February 2006; new printing in January 2009
House of Mystery	Vol. 2	1971–1973	House of Mystery #195–211	552	1-4012-1238-7	March 2007
House of Mystery	Vol. 3	1973–1975	House of Mystery #212–226	520	1-4012-2183-1	January 2009
House of Secrets	Vol. 1	1969–1972	House of Secrets #81–98	544	978-1-4012-1818-8	August 2008
House of Secrets	Vol. 2	1972–1975	House of Secrets #99–119	496	1-4012-2523-3	October 2009
Jonah Hex	Vol. 1	1970–1976	Jonah Hex stories from: All-Star Western #10–11; Weird Western Tales #12–14, 16–33; (Billy the Kid) outlaw stories from All-Star Western #2–8 "The Night of the Snake" feature from All-Star Western #6	528	1-4012-0760-X	November 2005; out of print
Jonah Hex	Vol. 2	1976–1979	Weird Western Tales #34–38; Jonah Hex #1–22	544	1-4012-4106-9	March 2014
Justice League of America	Vol. 1	1960–1962	The Brave and the Bold #28–30; Justice League of America #1–16; Mystery in Space #75	544	1-4012-0761-8	December 2005
Justice League of America	Vol. 2	1963–1965	Justice League of America #17–36	520	1-4012-1203-4	January 2007
Justice League of America	Vol. 3	1965–1968	Justice League of America #37–38; #40–47; #49–57; #59–60	528	1-4012-1718-4	December 2007
Justice League of America	Vol. 4	1968–1970	Justice League of America #61–66; #68–75; #77–83	544	978-1-4012-2184-3	March 2009
Justice League of America	Vol. 5	1970–1973	Justice League of America #84; #86–92; #94–106	528	1-4012-3025-3	February 2011
Justice League of America	Vol. 6	1973–1976	Justice League of America #107–132	528	1-4012-3835-1	February 2013
Legion of Super-Heroes	Vol. 1	1958–1964	Legion of Super-Heroes stories from: Adventure Comics #247, 267, 282, 290, 293, 300–321; Action Comics #267, 276, 287, 289; Superboy #86, 89, 98; Superman #147; Superman's Pal Jimmy Olsen #72, 76; "The Origin and Powers of the Legion of Super-Heroes" feature from Adventure Comics #316 (Note: Reprinted from Superman Annual #4 (1961) with alterations and new material) While it lists Superboy #117 on the title page, there is no story from it in the Table of Contents nor in the body of the book.	560	1-4012-1382-0	April 2007
Legion of Super-Heroes	Vol. 2	1964–1966, 1968	Legion of Super-Heroes stories from: Adventure Comics #322–348; Superboy #117 and 125; "The Origin and Powers of the Legion of Super-Heroes" feature from Adventure Comics #365 (Note: Reprinted from Adventure Comics #316 (January 1964) with alterations and new material)	528	978-1-4012-1724-2	April 2008
Legion of Super-Heroes	Vol. 3	1966–1968	Legion of Super-Heroes stories from: Adventure Comics #349–368; Superman's Pal Jimmy Olsen #106	496	978-1-4012-2185-0	April 2009
Legion of Super-Heroes	Vol. 4	1968–1972	Legion of Super-Heroes stories from: Adventure Comics #369–380; Action Comics #378–387, 389–392; Superboy #172–173, 176, 183–184, 188, 190–191	527	1-4012-2941-7	October 2010
Legion of Super-Heroes	Vol. 5	1973–1976	Legion of Super-Heroes stories from: Karate Kid #1; Superboy #193, 195, 197–220	517	978-1-4012-4297-8	November 2014
The Losers	Vol. 1	1969–1974	The Losers stories from: G.I. Combat #138; Our Fighting Forces #123–150	432	1-4012-3437-2	March 2012
Martian Manhunter	Vol. 1	1955–1962	Martian Manhunter stories from: Detective Comics #225–304	522	1-4012-1368-5	July 2007
Martian Manhunter	Vol. 2	1962–1968	Martian Manhunter stories from: Detective Comics #305–326; House of Mystery #143–173	592	1-4012-2256-0	May 2009
Men of War	Vol. 1	1977–1980	Men of War #1–26	496	978-1401243883	April 2014
Metal Men	Vol. 1	1962–1965	Metal Men stories from: Showcase #37–40; Metal Men #1–15; The Brave and the Bold #55	528	1-4012-1559-9	September 2007; out of print
Metal Men	Vol. 2	1965–1969	Metal Men #16–36; The Brave and the Bold #66	528	1-4012-1976-4	September 2008
Metamorpho	Vol. 1	1965–1967	The Brave and the Bold #57–58, 66, 68; Metamorpho #1–17; Justice League of America #42	560	1-4012-0762-6	October 2005; out of print
Our Army at War	Vol. 1	1952–1954	Our Army at War #1–20	512	1-4012-2942-5	December 2010
Phantom Stranger	Vol. 1	1969–1972	Showcase #80; Phantom Stranger (vol. 2) #1–21	544	1-4012-1088-0	October 2006
Phantom Stranger	Vol. 2	1972–1978	Phantom Stranger stories from: Phantom Stranger (vol. 2) #22–41; Justice League of America #103; House of Secrets #150; The Brave and the Bold #89, 98; DC Super Stars #18; Frankenstein stories from Phantom Stranger (vol. 2) #23–30	496	1-4012-1722-2	March 2008
Rip Hunter, Time Master	Vol. 1	1959–1963	Rip Hunter, Time Master stories from: Showcase #20, 21, 25, 26; Rip Hunter, Time Master #1–15	512	1401235212	August 2012
Robin, the Boy Wonder	Vol. 1	1964–1975	Robin solo stories from: Batman #184, 192, 227, 229–231, 234–236, 239–242, 244–246, 248–250, 252, 254; Detective Comics #386, 390, 394–395, 398–403, 445, 447, 450–451; Superman's Pal Jimmy Olsen #91, 111; Justice League of America #50, 91–92; The Brave and the Bold #83, 100; World's Finest Comics #195, 200	512	1-4012-1676-5	January 2008
Sea Devils	Vol. 1	1960–1964	Sea Devils stories from: Showcase #27–29; Sea Devils #1–16	512	1401235220	July 2012
Secrets of Sinister House	Vol. 1	1972–1974	The Sinister House of Secret Love #1–4; Secrets of Sinister House #5–18	496	1-4012-2626-4	February 2010
Sgt. Rock	Vol. 1	1959–1962	Sgt. Rock stories from: Our Army at War #81–117	544	978-1-4012-1713-6	November 2007; out of print
Sgt. Rock	Vol. 2	1962–1964	Sgt. Rock stories from: Our Army at War #118–148	544	1-4012-1984-5	November 2008; out of print
Sgt. Rock	Vol. 3	1964–1967	Sgt. Rock stories from: Our Army at War #149–180	512	1-4012-2771-6	August 2010
Sgt. Rock	Vol. 4	1967–1970	Sgt. Rock stories from: Our Army at War #181–216	520	1-4012-3811-4	March 2013
Shazam!	Vol. 1	1973–1978	Shazam! #1–33	528	1-4012-1089-9	December 2006
Showcase	Vol. 1	1956–1959	Showcase #1–21	544	1-4012-3523-9	July 2012
The Spectre	Vol. 1	1966–1969, 1974–1975, 1981, 1983	Spectre stories from: Showcase #60, 61, 64; The Brave and the Bold #72, 75, 116, 180, 199; The Spectre #1–10; Adventure Comics #431–440; DC Comics Presents #29; Ghosts #97–99	616	1-4012-3417-8	April 2012
Strange Adventures	Vol. 1	1955–1956	Strange Adventures #54–73	512	1-4012-1544-0	December 2008
Strange Adventures	Vol. 2	1956–1958	Strange Adventures #74–93	520	1-4012-3846-7	December 2013
Super Friends	Vol. 1	1976–1979	Super Friends #1–24	448	978-1-4012-2257-4	May 2014
Supergirl	Vol. 1	1958–1961	Supergirl stories from: Action Comics #252–282; Adventure Comics #278; Superboy #80; Superman #123, 139–140, 144; Superman's Girl Friend, Lois Lane #14; Superman's Pal Jimmy Olsen #40, 46, 51	528	1-4012-1717-6	November 2007
Supergirl	Vol. 2	1961–1965	Supergirl stories from: Action Comics #283–321	512	1-4012-1980-2	November 2008
Superman	Vol. 1	1958–1959	Action Comics #241–257; Superman #122–133	560	1-4012-0758-8	October 2005; new printing in October 2010
Superman	Vol. 2	1959–1961	Action Comics #258–275; Superman #134–145	576	1-4012-1041-4	June 2006
Superman	Vol. 3	1961–1962	Action Comics #276–292; Superman #146–156	560	1-4012-1271-9	April 2007
Superman	Vol. 4	1962–1964	Action Comics #293–310; Superman #157–167	528	1-4012-1847-4	September 2008
Superman Family	Vol. 1	1954–1957	Lois Lane stories from: Superman #28; Showcase #9; Superman's Pal Jimmy Olsen #1–22	576	1-4012-0787-1	March 2006
Superman Family	Vol. 2	1957–1959	Lois Lane stories from: Showcase #10; Superman's Girl Friend, Lois Lane #1–7; Superman's Pal Jimmy Olsen #23–34	520	1-4012-1656-0	February 2008
Superman Family	Vol. 3	1959–1960	Superman's Pal Jimmy Olsen #35–44; Superman's Girl Friend, Lois Lane #8–16	520	978-1-4012-2188-1	February 2009
Superman Family	Vol. 4	1960–1961	Superman's Pal Jimmy Olsen #45–53; Superman's Girl Friend, Lois Lane #17–26	520	1-4012-3837-8	April 2013
Tales of the Unexpected	Vol. 1	1956–1957	Tales of the Unexpected #1–20	512	1401235204	August 2012
Teen Titans	Vol. 1	1964–1968	The Brave and the Bold #54, 60; Showcase #59; Teen Titans #1–18	528	1-4012-0788-X	April 2006
Teen Titans	Vol. 2	1969–1971	Teen Titans #19–36; The Brave and the Bold #83, 94; World's Finest Comics #205	512	1-4012-1252-2	October 2007
The Trial of the Flash	Vol. 1	1983–1985	The Flash #323–327, 329–336, 340–350	592	1-4012-3182-9	August 2011
The Unknown Soldier	Vol. 1	1970–1975	Unknown Soldier stories from: Star-Spangled War Stories #151–190	560	1-4012-1090-2	November 2006
The Unknown Soldier	Vol. 2	1975–1978	Star-Spangled War Stories #191–204, Unknown Soldier #205–216	552	1-4012-4081-X	November 2014
Warlord	Vol. 1	1975–1979	1st Issue Special #8; Warlord #1–28	528	1-4012-2473-3	September 2009
The War that Time Forgot	Vol. 1	1960–1968	"The War that Time Forgot" stories from: Star-Spangled War Stories #90, 92, 94–125, 127–128	560	1-4012-1253-0	May 2007
Weird War Tales	Vol. 1	1971–1974	Weird War Tales #1–21	576	1-4012-3694-4	January 2013
The Witching Hour	Vol. 1	1969–1972	The Witching Hour #1–19	544	1-4012-3022-9	March 2011
Wonder Woman	Vol. 1	1958–1960	Wonder Woman #98–117	528	1-4012-1373-1	August 2007; out of print
Wonder Woman	Vol. 2	1960–1963	Wonder Woman #118–137	528	1-4012-1948-9	October 2008
Wonder Woman	Vol. 3	1963–1966	Wonder Woman #138–156	496	1-4012-2524-1	December 2009
Wonder Woman	Vol. 4	1966–1968	Wonder Woman #157–177	520	1-4012-3289-2	December 2011
World's Finest Comics	Vol. 1	1952, 1954–1960	Superman and Batman team-up stories from: Superman #76; World's Finest Comics #71–111	552	1-4012-1697-8	October 2007
World's Finest Comics	Vol. 2	1960–1964	Superman and Batman team-up stories from: World's Finest Comics #112–145	520	1-4012-1981-0	October 2008
World's Finest Comics	Vol. 3	1964–1968	Superman and Batman team-up stories from: World's Finest Comics #146–173	496	1-4012-2585-3	March 2010
World's Finest Comics	Vol. 4	1968–1971	Superman and Batman team-up stories from: World's Finest Comics #174–178, 180–187, 189–196, 202; Superman team-up stories from: World's Finest Comics #198–201	528	1-4012-3736-3	November 2012
Young Love	Vol. 1	1963–1966	Young Love #39–56	544	1-4012-3438-0	February 2012

== Cancelled Showcase Presents volumes ==
Title	Volume	Years covered	Issues collected	Pages	ISBN	Status
House of Secrets	Vol. 3	1975–197?	House of Secrets #120-?	528	1-4012-4104-2	September 2013 (Never Released)
Secret Society of Super Villains	Vol. 1	1976–1978	Secret Society of Super Villains stories from: Secret Society of Super Villains #1–15; Cancelled Comic Cavalcade #2 (Note: The features "Murder Times Seven" and "Death in Silver!" were originally commissioned to appear in the unpublished Secret Society of Super Villains #16 and 17, respectively.); DC Special Series #6; Justice League of America #166–168; Super-Team Family #14; Captain Comet stories from: DC Special #27; Super-Team Family #13	520	978-1-4012-1587-3	Replaced with two full-color hardcover collections: ISBN 9781401231095, 9781401231101
Suicide Squad	Vol. 1	1987–1988	Suicide Squad #1-18; Doom Patrol and Suicide Squad Special #1; Secret Origins (vol. 2) #14; Justice League International #13	528	1-4012-2730-9	Replaced with full-color trade paperbacks: ISBN 9781401258313, 9781401258337 and part of ISBN 9781401260910
Who's Who	Vols. 1–2	1985–1988	Who's Who in the DC Universe #1–26; Who's Who Update '87 #1–5; Who's Who Update '88 #1–4	N/A	1-4012-1266-2	Replaced with full color omnibus: ISBN 9781779505996
