= John Calnan =

American comics artist

- Born: John Calnan; February 26, 1932
- Died: December 27, 2016 (aged 84)
- Areas: Penciller, Inker
- Notable works: Batman, World's Finest Comics

John Calnan (February 26, 1932 – December 27, 2016) was an American comics artist best known as the co-creator of Lucius Fox with writer Len Wein.

== Early life ==
John Calnan graduated from the School of Visual Arts in New York City. One of his instructors was Jerry Robinson.

== Career ==
John Calnan's first work in the comic book industry was with fellow artist Tom Gill on The Lone Ranger series. Calnan later moved into the advertising field. He stated in a 2011 interview that he "became an advertising art director and TV producer for agencies and still kept the comic work on the side." Calnan began working for DC Comics in 1966 and drew a large number of stories for that publisher's horror comics titles such as Ghosts, The Unexpected, and The Witching Hour. His earliest credited work at DC Comics appeared in Our Fighting Forces #104 (Nov.–Dec. 1966). He worked primarily with editors Murray Boltinoff, Joe Orlando, and Robert Kanigher. A "Johnny Peril" story drawn by Calnan for The Unexpected series in 1969 was put into inventory and finally published ten years later in the APA-I fanzine. Calnan was the main artist on the "Metamorpho" back-up feature in Action Comics and World's Finest Comics. He later became the regular artist on the Superman and Batman team-up stories which were the main feature in World's Finest Comics. Soon after leaving that series, he and writer Bob Rozakis introduced the Quakemaster, an enemy of the Batman in DC Special #28 (July 1977). Calnan then became the artist on the main Batman solo-series. His debut on the series was "Where Were You On The Night Batman Was Killed?", a four-issue storyline in issues #291–294 (Sept.–Dec. 1977) written by David Vern Reed. Calnan drew the first appearance of Lucius Fox, a supporting cast member of the Batman mythos, in Batman #307 (Jan. 1979). This character was later portrayed by Morgan Freeman in the movies Batman Begins, The Dark Knight, and The Dark Knight Rises. Calnan's last work for DC Comics appeared in Action Comics #538 (Dec. 1982).

== Personal life ==
Calnan retired in 1996 and died on December 27, 2016, at the age of 84. He was survived by his wife, Barbara, his daughters, Donna, Susan, and Diane and his grandchildren.

== Bibliography ==
=== DC Comics ===
- Action Comics #410–418, 469, 471–472 (full art); #537–538 (inks over Irv Novick) (1972–1983)
- Adventure Comics #453 (full art); #492 (inks over Don Newton) (1977–1982)
- All-Out War #5 (1980)
- Batman #291–294, 298–299, 301–309 (full art); #352 (inks over Don Newton) (1977–1982)
- The Brave and the Bold #137 (full art); #126 (inks over Jim Aparo) (1976–1977)
- Capt. Storm #18 (1967)
- DC Comics Presents #47 (inks over Jose Delbo); #49 (inks over Rich Buckler) (1982)
- DC Special #28 (full art); #25 (inks over Lee Elias) (1976–1977)
- Detective Comics #467, 484 (full art); #490 (inks over Alex Saviuk); #519 (inks over Don Newton) (1976–1982)
- Falling in Love #130 (1972)
- The Flash #272 (1979)
- Ghosts #2–7, 9, 12–13, 17, 20–21, 27, 29, 32, 35–40, 44, 50–51, 53–54, 56, 59, 62–63, 73 (1971–1979)
- G.I. Combat #191, 201, 203 (1976–1977)
- Girls' Love Stories #155, 172 (1970–1972)
- House of Mystery #212, 251–253 (1973–1977)
- Legion of Super-Heroes vol. 2 #260 (inks over Joe Staton); #261 (inks over Ric Estrada); #271 (inks over Jimmy Janes) (1980–1981)
- Limited Collectors' Edition #C-32 (1974)
- Mystery in Space #111 (1980)
- The New Adventures of Superboy #10, 15–17, 19–21, 23–24 (full art); #32 (inks over Howard Bender) (1980–1982)
- Our Army at War #176 (1967)
- Our Fighting Forces #104, 110 (1966–1967)
- Secrets of Haunted House #12 (1978)
- Secrets of Sinister House #18 (1974)
- Superman #371, 373 (1982)
- The Superman Family #182–184, 187, 194–196, 198, 201–202, 204–206, 208–216 (full art); #205 (inks over Alex Saviuk); #221 (inks over Irv Novick) (1977–1982)
- Superman's Girl Friend, Lois Lane #121 (1972)
- The Unexpected #118, 121, 127, 129–130, 134, 137, 144, 157–158, 164, 189, 193, 204 (1979–1980)
- The Witching Hour #16–18, 20, 28, 31, 47, 58, 64 (1971–1976)
- Wonder Woman #265–266 (Wonder Girl back-up story) (inks over Ric Estrada) (1980)
- World's Finest Comics #218–220, 229, 244 (full art); #232–233, 235–236, 238, 240 (inks over Dick Dillin); #234, 239 (inks over Curt Swan); #237 (inks over Lee Elias); #241 (inks over Pablo Marcos); #242 (inks over Ernie Chan); #281 (inks over Don Newton) (1973–1982)
- Young Love #97 (1972)

=== George A. Pflaum ===
- Treasure Chest of Fun and Fact #v16#2 [288], #v16#4 [290], #v16#8 [294] (1960)

=== Western Publishing ===
- Mystery Comics Digest #19 (1974)

Preceded by Dick Dillin	World's Finest Comics artist 1975–1976	Succeeded by Curt Swan
Preceded by Mike Grell	Batman artist 1977–1979	Succeeded by Irv Novick
