= DC Special =

Comic book anthology series

- Cover of DC Special #1 (December 1968), art by Carmine Infantino.

Publication information
- Publisher: DC Comics
- Schedule: Quarterly, then bimonthly
- Format: Ongoing
- Publication date: December 1968–November – December 1971; Spring 1975 – August–September 1977
- No. of issues: 29

Creative team
- Written by: List: Gerry Conway, Mark Hannerfeld, Paul Levitz, Bob Rozakis
- Penciller(s): List: Rich Buckler, John Calnan, Bill Draut, Arvell Jones, Don Newton, Joe Staton
- Inker(s): List: Dan Adkins, Tex Blaisdell, Bill Draut, Bob Layton, Joe Rubinstein
- Colorist(s): List: Liz Berube, Jerry Serpe, Anthony Tollin
- Editor(s): List: Julius Schwartz (#1, 7, 9, 13, 16–17, 20) Murray Boltinoff (#2, 10, 22–25) Mort Weisinger (#3, 8) Joe Orlando (#4, 11, 26, 29) Joe Kubert (#5) Dick Giordano (#6) E. Nelson Bridwell (#12, 14–15, 18–19, 21) Paul Levitz (#27–28)

DC Special was a comic book anthology series published by DC Comics originally from 1968 to 1971; it resumed publication from 1975 to 1977. For the most part, DC Special was a theme-based reprint title, mostly focusing on stories from DC's Golden Age; at the end of its run it published a few original stories.

== Publication history ==
DC Special began publication with an issue focusing on the work of artist Carmine Infantino and cover dated October–December 1968. Some of the themes the title covered were special issues devoted to individual artists such as Infantino and Joe Kubert, strange sports stories, origins of super-villains, and stories of historical literary adventure characters such as Robin Hood and The Three Musketeers. Issue #4 featured many supernatural characters and writer Mark Hanerfeld and artist Bill Draut crafted the first appearance of Abel, who later became (along with his brother Cain) a major character in Neil Gaiman's The Sandman. The series was cancelled with issue #15 (November–December 1971).

The book was revived four years later and continued the numbering of the original series. The final three issues featured all-new stories. Issue #27 was a book-length Captain Comet and Tommy Tomorrow story by Bob Rozakis and Rich Buckler. Artist Don Newton began his career at DC Comics with an Aquaman story in DC Special #28 (July 1977). That same issue introduced the Quakemaster, an enemy of the Batman co-created by writer Bob Rozakis and artist John Calnan. Paul Levitz and Joe Staton finished the series with a Justice Society of America story which revealed the team's origin.

With DC Special's cancellation following issue #29 (Aug.–Sept. 1977), DC immediately begin publishing the umbrella one-shot title DC Special Series, which lasted until Fall 1981.

== The issues ==
Issue	Title	Date	Notes
1	All-Infantino Issue	Fall 1968	Reprints The Adventures of Rex the Wonder Dog #29, The Brave and the Bold #45, Detective Comics #327, The Flash #148, and Mystery in Space #57
2	Top Teen Favorites	Winter 1969	Reprints Everything Happens to Harvey #4
3	All-Girl Issue	Spring 1969	Reprints stories from Action Comics #304, Green Lantern #16, and Strange Adventures #18. Also includes previously unpublished Black Canary and Wonder Woman stories.
4	13 Shock-Ending Stories	July–Sept. 1969	Original framing story followed by reprints from House of Mystery #2, 5, 15, 19, 26, 30, 62–63, 68; Sensation Comics #114; and Tales of the Unexpected #1, 16–17. First appearance of Abel (of Cain and Abel).
5	The Secret Lives of Joe Kubert	Fall 1969	Reprints stories from The Brave and the Bold #18, 35; Our Army at War #113; and Showcase #2
6	The Wild Frontier!	Winter 1970	Reprints stories from Detective Comics #178; Frontier Fighters #4, 6; The Legends of Daniel Boone #1; and World's Finest Comics #69
7	Strangest Sports Stories Ever Told!	Spring 1970	Reprints stories from The Brave and the Bold #45–46, 48–49; and Mystery in Space #39
8	Wanted! The World's Most Dangerous Villains	Summer 1970	Reprints stories from The Brave and the Bold #36, The Flash #130, Green Lantern #7, and World's Finest Comics #129
9	Strangest Sports Stories Ever Told!	Fall 1970	Reprints stories from The Brave and the Bold #45–48
10	Stop!... You Can't Beat The Law!	Jan.–Feb. 1971	Reprints stories from Gang Busters #33, 40, 58, 61, 65; and Showcase #1, 5
11	Beware... The Monsters Are Here!	March–April 1971	Reprints House of Mystery #70, 85, 97, 113, 116, and 175
12	The Viking Prince	May–June 1971	Also featuring the Silent Knight, Robin Hood, and the Golden Gladiator. Reprints The Brave and the Bold #1, 5, 9, and 16
13	Strangest Sports Stories Ever Told!	July–Aug. 1971	Reprints The Brave and the Bold #47, 49; Mystery in Space #7, 9; and Strange Adventures #94, 125
14	Wanted! The World's Most Dangerous Villains!	Sept.–Oct. 1971	Reprints The Flash #140, Superman #47, and World's Finest Comics #55
15	Plastic Man	Nov.–Dec. 1971	Reprints Plastic Man #17, 25-26; and Police Comics #1, 13
16	Super-Heroes Battle Super-Gorillas	Spring 1975	Reprints Detective Comics #339, The Flash #127, Superman #138, and Wonder Woman #170
17	Presents Green Lantern	Summer 1975	Reprints Green Lantern #2, 6, and 26
18	Presents... Earth Shaking Stories	Oct.–Nov. 1975	Reprints Action Comics #342, Captain Marvel Adventures #122, and Green Lantern #43
19	War Against the Giants	Dec. 1975–Jan. 1976	Reprints Action Comics #343, Green Lantern #53, Strange Adventures #28, and Wonder Woman #106
20	Green Lantern	Feb.–March 1976	Reprints Green Lantern #2, 8, and 30
21	Super-Heroes' War Against the Monsters	April–May 1976	Reprints Action Comics #326, Green Lantern #3, Marvel Family #7, and Star Spangled War Stories #132
22	The 3 Musketeers and Robin Hood	June–July 1976	Reprints The Brave and the Bold #6, and Robin Hood Tales #14
23	The 3 Musketeers and Robin Hood	Aug.–Sept. 1976	Reprints The Brave and the Bold #9, and Robin Hood Tales #7
24	The 3 Musketeers and Robin Hood	Oct.–Nov. 1976	Reprints The Brave and the Bold #11 and 15
25	The 3 Musketeers and Robin Hood	Dec. 1976–Jan. 1977	Reprints The Brave and the Bold #7-8, and 15
26	Enemy Ace	Feb.–March 1977	Reprints Our Army at War #151, and Star Spangled War Stories #143
27	Danger: Dinosaurs at Large!	April–May 1977	Original Captain Comet and Tommy Tomorrow story
28	Earth Shattering Disasters	June–July 1977	Original stories featuring Batman, Aquaman, and the Legion of Super-Heroes
29	The Untold Origin of the Justice Society	Aug.–Sept. 1977	Original story about the Justice Society of America

== Collected editions ==
- Black Canary Archives includes the Black Canary story from DC Special #3, 224 pages, December 2000, ISBN 978-1563897344
- Secret Society of Super Villains Vol. 2 includes DC Special #27, 328 pages, May 2012, ISBN 978-1401231101
- Legion of Super-Heroes Archive Vol. 13 includes the Legion of Super-Heroes story from DC Special #28, 240 pages, May 2012, ISBN 978-1401234393
- Justice Society Vol. 1 includes DC Special #29, 224 pages, August 2006, ISBN 1-4012-0970-X
- Showcase Presents: All-Star Comics Vol. 1 includes DC Special #29, 448 pages, September 2011, ISBN 978-1401233037

== See also ==
- DC Special Series
