= Kurt Schaffenberger =

American cartoonist (1920–2002)

- Schaffenberger self-portrait from Superman's Pal Jimmy Olsen #155 (Jan. 1973)
- Born: December 15, 1920 Thuringian Forest, Germany
- Died: January 24, 2002 (aged 81) Brick, Ocean County, New Jersey, U.S.
- Areas: Penciller, Inker
- Notable works: Captain Marvel; Superman's Girl Friend, Lois Lane
- Awards: National Cartoonists Society Comic Book Award (1984)

Kurt Schaffenberger (December 15, 1920 – January 24, 2002) was an American comics artist. He was best known for his work on Captain Marvel and the Marvel Family during both the Golden Age and Bronze Age of comics, as well as his work on the title Superman's Girl Friend, Lois Lane during the 1950s and 1960s. Schaffenberger used the alias "Lou Wahl" on certain comics, when he was moonlighting from his main job of drawing Lois Lane at DC Comics.

== Biography ==
=== Early career ===
Schaffenberger was born on a farm in the Thuringian Forest, Germany, where, as a boy, he ". . . tended geese, herded goats, and hoed potatoes." Emigrating to America as a 7-year-old, first to Hartford, Connecticut, and then to New York City, he eventually won a scholarship to the Pratt Institute. After graduation, he joined Jack Binder's studio in 1941, where he worked on key Fawcett Comics titles including Captain Marvel, Bulletman, and Ibis the Invincible.

While working for Binder's studio, which was located in Englewood, New Jersey, Schaffenberger took over an apartment from the local high school football coach, Vince Lombardi, who had yet to achieve success in the National Football League.

During this time, Schaffenberger's work was also published by Prize, Street & Smith, and Pines.

Schaffenberger served in the U.S. military during World War II, including a stint with the Office of Strategic Services, leaving the military with the rank of Master Sergeant. His knowledge of German allowed him to translate information from Allied spies behind Nazi lines for the OSS.

Schaffenberger returned to the world of professional sequential art soon after war's end. He resumed his work for the Captain Marvel family of titles, and expanded his reach to an even more diverse group of publishing houses, including EC Comics, Gilberton, Premier Magazines, American Comics Group, and Marvel Comics. At Gilberton, Schaffenberger provided the interior art for Classics Illustrated No. 119, Soldiers of Fortune (May 1954).

=== DC Comics ===
An example of Schaffenberger's art: young Jonathan and Martha Kent, from The New Adventures of Superboy #1 (Jan. 1980).

In 1957 Otto Binder recruited Schaffenberger to DC Comics to work on the Superman family. He stayed at DC for the next 30 years, making an especially large contribution to the development of Lois Lane. In this capacity, he was the lead artist on the Superman's Girl Friend, Lois Lane series for the entirety of its first decade. Indeed, Schaffenberger's rendition of Lane became cited by many as the "definitive" version of the character, and Schaffenberger was often asked by DC editor Mort Weisinger to redraw other artists' depictions of Lois Lane in other DC titles where she appeared. Catwoman made her first appearance in the Silver Age of Comic Books in Superman's Girl Friend, Lois Lane #70 (Nov. 1966) in a story drawn by Schaffenberger. In issue #80 (Jan. 1968), Schaffenberger updated the character's fashions to a then-more contemporary look.

He was essentially fired from DC in 1970 for helping to organize other artists to protest bad working conditions. He then briefly freelanced and worked for Marvel, but returned to DC in 1972.

When, in the 1970s, DC acquired the rights to the Marvel Family, Schaffenberger was one of the key players in the revival of those characters. The late 1970s saw him contribute outside the Superman family of titles, including work on titles such as Wonder Woman and Super Friends.

In 1980, Schaffenberger was again leading a Superman family title, The New Adventures of Superboy, the final, post-Legion title for the original Superboy. Somewhat metaphorically, the Superboy- and Supergirl-less DC universe that followed the events of Crisis on Infinite Earths turned out to be a mostly Schaffenberger-less one as well. He largely retired from comics soon after helping with the final pre-Crisis Superman tale "Whatever Happened to the Man of Tomorrow?"

Schaffenberger was a special guest at the 1996 San Diego Comic-Con.

=== Personal life ===
Schaffenberger and his wife, the former Dorothy Bates Watson, who married in Englewood, New Jersey, on March 30, 1946, had two children, Susan and her three-years-younger brother, Karl. The family lived for four decades in the same house in River Edge, New Jersey, before moving in 1989.

== Awards ==
Schaffenberger's work won him the 1984 National Cartoonists Society Award in the "Comic Book" division. He received an Inkpot Award in 1996.

== Bibliography ==
=== Apple Press ===
- Mr. Fixitt #2 (1990)

=== Claypool Comics ===
- Phantom of Fear City #4–7, 9–11 (1993–1995)

=== DC Comics ===
- Action Comics #274, 359, 361–372, 374–376, 437, 442, 445, 460, 464, 474–476, 486, 501, 556, 558–559, 561–562, 565, 567, 570, 573–576, 578, 580–583, 600, 637–640 (1961–1989)
- Adventure Comics #382–389, 391–396 (1969–1970)
- Amethyst, Princess of Gemworld vol. 2 #4 (1985)
- Blue Devil #30 (1986)
- DC Comics Presents #32, 50, 59, 93, 96 (1981–1986)
- DC Special Series #11 (The Flash) (1978)
- Detective Comics #456–457 (Elongated Man), #483–488 (Robin) (1976–1980)
- The Flash #264 (1978)
- Green Lantern Annual #3 (1987)
- Hero Hotline #1–6 (1989)
- History of the DC Universe hardcover (one page) (1988)
- Legion of Super-Heroes vol. 2 #305 (1983)
- Legion of Super-Heroes vol. 3 #45 (1988)
- M.A.S.K. vol. 2 #1–9 (1987)
- The New Adventures of Superboy #1–54 (1980–1984)
- Outsiders #20 (1987)
- Shazam #11, 14–20, 25–31, 35 (1974–1978)
- Super Friends #14, 18, 20, 29, 32 (1978–1980)
- Superman #121, 124–126, 128, 131, 142, 150, 282, 288, 327–329, 362, 365, 366, 370, 374, 405, 409 (1958–1985)
- The Superman Family #164, 167, 170, 172–180, 182–185, 188–193, 195–202, 204–212, 216–220, 222 (1974–1982)
- Superman's Girl Friend, Lois Lane #1–28, 30–81 (1958–1968)
- Superman's Pal Jimmy Olsen #56, 66, 81, 89, 154–163 (1961–1974)
- Superman:The Secret Years #1–4 (1985)
- Who's Who in the Legion of Super-Heroes #7 (1988)
- Who's Who: The Definitive Directory of the DC Universe #4, 11, 14–15, 19–21, 26 (1985–1987)
- Who's Who: Update '87 #5 (1987)
- Wonder Woman #218 (1975)
- World of Smallville #1–4 (1988)
- World's Finest Comics #246–249, 253–259 (1977–1979)
- Young Love #101, 124 (1972–1977)

=== Fawcett Comics ===
- Captain Marvel Adventures #91, 109, 142, 145, 147 (1948–1953)
- Captain Marvel Jr. #41, 45, 47, 55, 57–62, 88, 90, 94 (1946–1951)
- Ibis the Invincible #5 (1946)
- Marvel Family #53, 89 (1950–1954)
- Whiz Comics #88–89, 91, 95 (1947–1948)

=== HM Communications, Inc. ===
- Heavy Metal #v6#9 (1982)

=== Marvel Comics ===
- Adventure into Mystery #1 (1956)
- Astonishing #49, 51 (1956)
- Journey into Unknown Worlds #46, 49 (1956)
- Mystery Tales #41 (1956)
- Mystical Tales #2 (1956)
- Our Love Story #19 (1972)
- Strange Tales #39 (1955)
- World of Fantasy #2, 15 (1956–1958)

=== 3-D Zone ===
- Daughters of Time 3-D #1 (1991)

Preceded by n/a	Superman's Girl Friend, Lois Lane artist 1958–1968	Succeeded by Irv Novick
Preceded by Jim Mooney	"Supergirl" feature in Action Comics artist 1968–1969	Succeeded by n/a
Preceded by Win Mortimer	"Supergirl" feature in Adventure Comics artist 1969–1970	Succeeded by Mike Sekowsky
Preceded by Mike Sekowsky	Superman's Pal Jimmy Olsen artist 1972–1974	Succeeded by n/a
Preceded by n/a	"Jimmy Olsen" feature in The Superman Family artist 1974–1979	Succeeded by John Calnan
