= Super-Team Family =

- Cover of Super-Team Family #1 (October–November 1975), art by Dick Giordano.

Publication information
- Publisher: DC Comics
- Schedule: Bimonthly
- Format: Ongoing series
- Genre: Superhero
- Publication date: October–November 1975 – March–April 1978
- No. of issues: 15
- Main character(s): Superman, Batman, the Flash, the Challengers of the Unknown, the Doom Patrol, the Atom

Creative team
- Written by: List: Gerry Conway, Dennis O'Neil, Steve Skeates
- Penciller: List: Ric Estrada, Arvell Jones, James Sherman, Alan Weiss
- Inker: List: Jack Abel, Bill Draut, Josef Rubinstein, Romeo Tanghal, Wally Wood
- Editor: List: Gerry Conway (#1–3) E. Nelson Bridwell (#4–6) Joe Orlando (#7, #10) Tony Isabella (#8) Dennis O'Neil (#9) Paul Levitz (#11–15)

Collected editions
- Secret Society of Super Villains Volume 2: ISBN 978-1401231101

Super-Team Family is a comic book anthology series published by DC Comics from 1975 to 1978 that lasted for 15 issues. It included a mix of original and reprinted stories.

== Publication history ==
Super-Team Family began publication with an October–November 1975 cover date. DC Comics published several other ... Family titles concurrent with Super-Team Family including The Superman Family (1974–1982), Batman Family (1975–1978), and Tarzan Family (1975–1976). As a rule, DC's ... Family titles contained mostly reprints and featured a higher page count and higher price than DC's normal books.

The original intention of Super-Team Family was to be a "home" for original story team-ups without Batman, as editor Gerry Conway wrote in the letters column of issue #1. The first issue was only all-reprints due to scheduling problems, according to Conway. By issue #3 "economics had changed", and readers were informed that the series would go all-reprints with #4, edited by E. Nelson Bridwell. As of #8 the editor changed again, and Super-Team Family returned to an original-story format, with the occasional reprint seen in back-up stories.

A Creeper/Wildcat team-up in #2 and a Flash/Hawkman tale in #3 were the only new stories in the first seven issues of the title. The Challengers of the Unknown were the lead feature in issues #8–10 in a series of new stories by writer Steve Skeates and artists James Sherman and Jack Abel. Reprinted backup stories were eliminated as of #11 which saw the start of a four-issue serial written by Gerry Conway, starring the Atom teaming up with various other DC characters.

DC management liked the sales results of later issues of the series and saw the financial advantage of lowering the page count. Rather than redefining the nature of the "... Family" titles, they opted to create a new series. Super-Team Family ended its run with issue #15 (March–April 1978), and was replaced a few months later with the Superman team-up title DC Comics Presents (July 1978).

After the cancellation of Super-Team Family, a Supergirl/Doom Patrol team-up by Gerry Conway and artist Arvell Jones originally scheduled to appear in the series was published in The Superman Family #191–193 (Sept.–Oct. 1978/Jan.–Feb. 1979).

== The issues ==
Issue	Cover date	Characters	Notes
#1	October–November 1975	Superman and Batman	Reprinted from World's Finest Comics #175 (May 1968)
#1	October–November 1975	Teen Titans	Reprinted from Teen Titans #19 (January–February 1969)
#1	October–November 1975	The Flash	Reprinted from The Flash #166 (December 1966)
#2	December 1975 – January 1976	The Creeper and Wildcat	Original story by Dennis O'Neil, Ric Estrada, and Bill Draut
#2	December 1975 – January 1976	Batman and Deadman	Reprinted from The Brave and the Bold #79 (August–September 1968)
#2	December 1975 – January 1976	Green Arrow	Reprinted from Adventure Comics #266 (November 1959)
#3	February–March 1976	The Flash and Hawkman	Original story by Steve Skeates, Ric Estrada, and Wally Wood
#3	February–March 1976	Aquaman	Reprinted from Adventure Comics #267 (December 1959)
#3	February–March 1976	Green Arrow	Reprinted from Adventure Comics #267 (December 1959)
#3	February–March 1976	Superman and Batman	Reprinted from World's Finest Comics #176 (June 1968)
#4	April–May 1976	Justice Society of America	Reprinted from All Star Comics #33 (February–March 1947)
#4	April–May 1976	Superman and Batman	Reprinted from World's Finest Comics #98 (December 1958)
#5	June–July 1976	Batman and Eclipso	Reprinted from The Brave and the Bold #64 (February–March 1966)
#5	June–July 1976	"Origin of Eclipso"	Single-page recap of Eclipso's origin reprinting material from House of Secrets
#5	June–July 1976	"Superboy's Workshop"	Single page story
#5	June–July 1976	Superboy	Reprinted from Superboy #47 (March 1956)
#6	August–September 1976	Superman and Batman	Reprinted from World's Finest Comics #168 (August 1967)
#6	August–September 1976	Marvel Family	Reprinted from Marvel Family #89 (January 1954)
#7	October–November 1976	Teen Titans	Reprinted from Teen Titans #31 (January–February 1971)
#7	October–November 1976	Doom Patrol	Reprinted from Doom Patrol #86 (March 1964)
#8	December 1976 – January 1977	Challengers of the Unknown	Original story by Steve Skeates, James Sherman, and Jack Abel
#8	December 1976 – January 1977	"Team Talk"	Original two-page story
#8	December 1976 – January 1977	Doom Patrol	Reprinted from Doom Patrol #86 (March 1964) and #87 (May 1964)
#9	February–March 1977	Challengers of the Unknown	Original story by Steve Skeates, James Sherman, and Jack Abel
#9	February–March 1977	Green Arrow	Reprinted from Adventure Comics #254 (November 1958)
#9	February–March 1977	Doom Patrol	Reprinted from Doom Patrol #88 (June 1964)
#10	April–May 1977	Challengers of the Unknown	Original story by Steve Skeates, James Sherman, and Jack Abel
#10	April–May 1977	Doom Patrol	Reprinted from Doom Patrol #88 (June 1964)
#11	June–July 1977	The Flash, Supergirl, and the Atom	Original story by Gerry Conway, Alan Weiss, and Josef Rubinstein
#12	August–September 1977	Green Lantern, Hawkman, and the Atom	Original story by Gerry Conway, Arvell Jones, and Bill Draut
#12	August–September 1977	Hawkman	Reprinted from The Brave and the Bold #42 (1962)
#13	October–November 1977	Aquaman, Captain Comet, and the Atom	Original story by Gerry Conway, Arvell Jones, and Romeo Tanghal
#14	December 1977 – January 1978	Wonder Woman and the Atom	Original story by Gerry Conway, Arvell Jones, and Romeo Tanghal
#15	March–April 1978	The Flash and the New Gods	Original story by Gerry Conway, Arvell Jones, and Romeo Tanghal

== Collected editions ==
Part of the series has been collected in a trade paperback:

- Secret Society of Super Villains Volume 2 includes Super-Team Family #13–14, 328 pages, May 2012, ISBN 978-1401231101
