= Robin Hood (DC Comics) =

- Robin Hood from The Brave and the Bold vol. 1 #9 (December 1956), art by Russ Heath.

Publication information
- Publisher: DC Comics
- First appearance: New Adventure Comics vol. 1 #23 (January 1938)
- Created by: Sven Elven (writer & artist)

In-story information
- Alter ego: Robert Fitzooth
- Team affiliations: Merry Men
- Abilities: Expert fencer, archer, and tactician.

Robin Hood is a fictional character appearing in media published by DC Comics, based on the legendary character of the same name. The character debuted in New Adventure Comics vol. 1 #23 (January 1938), and was created by Sven Elven.

== Publication history ==
The DC Comics version of Robin Hood first appeared in New Adventure Comics vol. 1, #23 (January 1938). Robin Hood's debut in January 1938 was one of the earliest appearances of a recurring character in a DC Comics title, and predates Superman's debut in June 1938.

The character then shows up in Robin Hood Tales #1 (February 1956) published by Quality Comics; the series was later bought and published by National Periodical Publications (later known as DC Comics) starting with Robin Hood Tales #7 (February 1957).

== Fictional character biography ==
The mainstream DC Comics version of Robin Hood is Robert Fitzooth, the 12th century Earl of Huntingdon. Fitzooth a veteran soldier, discovers the ruins of his family castle upon returning from the Crusades. He later learns that Prince John has usurped the throne of his brother, Richard the Lionheart, Prince John razed the elder Earl of Huntingdon's castle and confiscated his lands because he supported King Richard. A suspicious Richard had sent Fitzooth back to England ahead of his return from the Crusades. Robert Fitzooth was given Richard's royal ring, and empowered to act on his behalf. Fitzooth loses the ring to Prince John's machinations and uses his military training to found a rebel movement based in Sherwood Forest, to oppose Prince John's rule and retrieve the royal seal. He takes his namesake "Robin" from a small bird, a robin he sees bravely opposing a falcon. The surname "Hood" from a green hood was given to him by the Countess Marian, otherwise known as Lady Marian or Maid Marian.

=== More Fun Comics ===
In More Fun Comics #82 Speedy and Green Arrow use "time pills" confiscated from a mad scientist named Professor Wurm to travel back to the 12th century era of Robin Hood. They discover that Robin Hood has been framed for murder by Sir Guy of Gisbourne; Green Arrow clears Robin's name, and later returns to the present day with Speedy.

=== Detective Comics ===
In Detective Comics vol. 1 #116, Batman and Robin meet and rescue Robin Hood. Batman also takes part in an archery tournament sponsored by the Sheriff of Nottingham, all thanks to Professor Carter Nichols and his "time hypnosis" technology.

=== World's Finest Comics ===
Green Arrow travels through time again, and switches places with Robin Hood in World's Finest Comics vol. 1 #40.

=== Wonder Woman ===
Wonder Woman traveled back in time twice to meet Robin Hood using the "Amazon time-and-space transformer", in Wonder Woman vol. 1 #82, and then later in Wonder Woman vol. 1 #94.

=== Adventure Comics ===
In Adventure Comics vol. 1 #264, while visiting Sherwood Forest, Green Arrow and Speedy discover a time machine in a secret World War II laboratory. They both travel back in time where Green Arrow temporarily takes the place of an injured Robin Hood. He helps the Merry Men fight the Sheriff of Nottingham, and rescues Maid Marian. At adventure's conclusion the time machine returns Green Arrow and Speedy to the present.

=== Rip Hunter, Time Master ===
Rip Hunter and a pretty female stowaway meet Richard I of England, as well as Robin Hood, Maid Marian and the Merry Men in Rip Hunter, Time Master #22.

=== Superman's Girl Friend, Lois Lane ===
In Superman's Girl Friend, Lois Lane #22, Robin Hood appears in an imaginary story where he meets Lois Lane and Superman. The story is later reprinted in Superman's Girl Friend, Lois Lane #74.

=== Justice League of America ===
In Justice League of America #101 the Seven Soldiers of Victory, the Justice Society of America, and the Justice League of America all become lost in time while battling the Nebula Man. In the story Green Arrow once again stands in for an injured Robin Hood, he is captured by the Sheriff of Nottingham but later rescued by members of the JLA and JSA.

== Other versions ==
- Writer Michael Jan Friedman and artist Luke McDonnell launched a retelling of the Robin Hood legend with Outlaws: The Legend of the Man Called Hood #1 (September 1991). Outlaws was an eight issue mini-series which re-imagined the legend set in a future, post-apocalyptic alternate time, akin to the future depicted in films such as Mad Max.
- Robin Hood and his band appear in Fables #4 (October 2002). Along with other folk heroes in the Vertigo Comics series, they give their lives to buy time for the last ship to flee to the mundane world.
