= James Sherman (comics) =

American artist and graphic designer

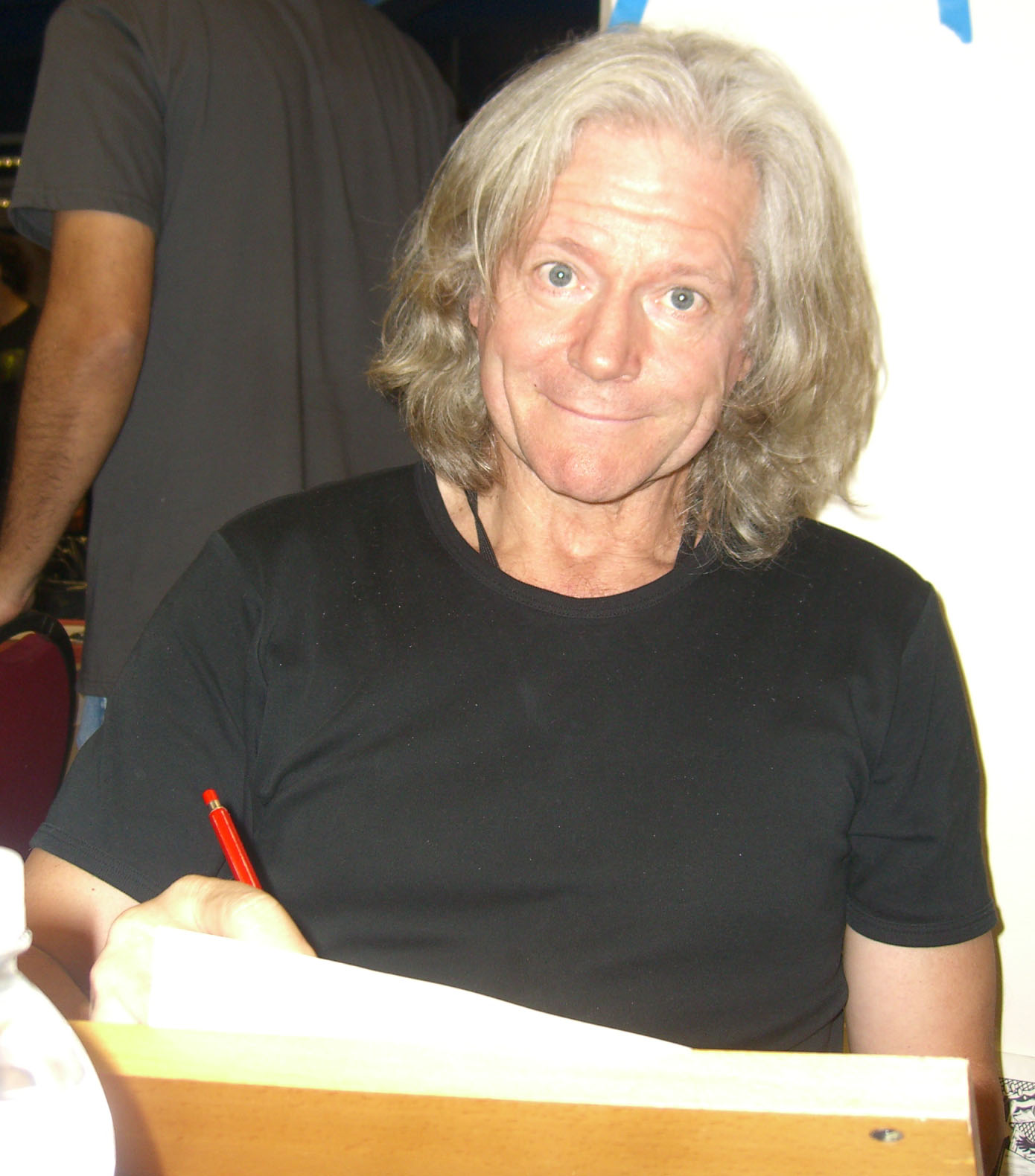
- Sherman at the November 2008 Big Apple Con in Manhattan.
- Born: 1948 (age 77–78)
- Areas: Penciller, Inker
- Notable works: Superboy and the Legion of Super-Heroes

James Sherman (born 1948) is an American artist known for his work in comic books, movies, and logos.

== Career ==
James Sherman is an artist and colorist who worked for DC Comics and Marvel Comics in the 1970s and 1980s. His first professional comics art appeared in Tarzan Family #65 and Blackhawk #248 (both cover dated Sept.–Oct. 1976). He drew the Challengers of the Unknown lead feature in Super-Team Family #8–10 in collaboration with writer Steve Skeates and inker Jack Abel. Sherman is best known for his pencil work on Superboy and the Legion of Super-Heroes in the late 1970s, when he took over as regular artist following Mike Grell. He and writer Paul Levitz introduced the Dawnstar character in Superboy and the Legion of Super-Heroes #226 (April 1977). Sherman's run ended halfway through the multiple issue "Earthwar" story arc due to his displeasure with the direction of the storyline. He did not like the ending which had Mordru the magician revealed as the final villain behind all the different factions attacking Earth. He left the title and was replaced by Joe Staton. Sherman's run as the regular penciller on Superboy and the Legion of Super-Heroes ran from issue #225 (March 1977) to #242 (Aug. 1978).

In 1980, Sherman joined Upstart Associates, a shared studio space on West 29th Street in New York City. Founded by Howard Chaykin, Walt Simonson, Val Mayerik, and Jim Starlin; Sherman replaced Mayerik, who had left the city. The membership of the studio changed over time, and eventually Sherman took the space over for his own use.

At Marvel Comics, Sherman worked on various titles including The Spectacular Spider-Man Annual #3 (1981) which featured a guest appearance by the Man-Wolf. Sherman was the artist on Elaine Lee's 1991 noir space opera The Transmutation of Ike Garuda. He has done occasional fill-in work on a number of titles, but primarily works in commercial art.

Sherman created the logo for the supermarket chain ShopRite. Sherman formerly claimed to have created the logo for Major League Baseball. He has since acknowledged that a logo he designed for MLB is similar to the original logo, but that he did not design the original logo.

== Bibliography ==
Comics work (interior pencil art) includes:

=== DC Comics ===
- All-New Collectors' Edition #C–55 (backup feature) (1978)
- Blackhawk #248 (1976)
- Heroes Against Hunger #1 (Superman and Batman) (1986)
- House of Mystery #270 (1979)
- Icon #1 (colorist) (1993)
- Legion of Super-Heroes vol. 2 #262, 300 (1980–1983)
- Superboy and the Legion of Super-Heroes #225–226, 228–231, 233, 236, 240–242 (1977–1978)
- Super-Team Family #8–10 (Challengers of the Unknown) (1976–1977)
- Tarzan Family #65–66 (Korak, Son of Tarzan) (1976)
- Who's Who: The Definitive Directory of the DC Universe #6–7 (1985)
- World's Finest Comics #245 (Wonder Woman); #263 (Adam Strange) (1977–1980)

=== Eclipse Comics ===
- Eclipse Magazine #4 (1982)

=== First Comics ===
- American Flagg! #13 (1984)

=== Harvey Pekar ===
- American Splendor #12 (inks only) (1987)

=== Marvel Comics ===
- Alpha Flight #83 (1990)
- Amazing High Adventure #2 (colorist) (1985)
- Deadly Hands of Kung Fu #26 (1976)
- Power Pack #49 (1989)
- The Punisher vol. 2 #39 (1990)
- Raiders of the Lost Ark #1 (cover only) (1981)
- Silver Surfer vol. 3 #39 (1990)
- The Spectacular Spider-Man Annual #3 (1981)
- Uncanny X-Men #151 (1981)
- What If...? #37 (Beast) (1983)

==== Epic Comics ====
- Critical Mass #6 (1990)
- Dreadstar #24 (1986)
- Steelgrip Starkey #1–3 (1986)
- The Transmutation of Ike Garuda #1–2 (1991–1992)

=== Now Comics ===
- Kato of the Green Hornet II #1–2 (1992)

Preceded by Mike Grell	Superboy and the Legion of Super-Heroes artist 1977–1978	Succeeded by Joe Staton
