= Quakemaster =

DC Comics supervillain

- Quakemaster as depicted in Who's Who: The Definitive Directory of the DC Universe #19 (September 1986). Art by Don Drake.

Publication information
- Publisher: DC Comics
- First appearance: DC Special #28 (June–July 1977)
- Created by: Bob Rozakis (writer); John Calnan, Tex Blaisdell (art)

In-story information
- Alter ego: Robert Coleman
- Team affiliations: Secret Society of Super Villains
- Abilities: None

Quakemaster (Robert Coleman) is a supervillain appearing in American comic books published by DC Comics. He first appeared in DC Special #28 (June–July 1977) and was co-created by writer Bob Rozakis and artist John Calnan.

== Fictional character biography ==
Robert Coleman is an architect in Gotham City whose reputation is damaged when an apartment complex he designed fails to withstand a hurricane. Feeling that he has been wrongly branded, Coleman creates the alias of the Quakemaster and uses his super-charged jackhammer to create earthquakes in Gotham City. His scheme backfires and only his buildings are damaged in the quakes. Quakemaster is defeated and captured by Batman.

Quakemaster is later released and recruited by the Secret Society of Super Villains to be part of the team working with Silver Ghost to kill the Freedom Fighters. This story was scheduled to appear in The Secret Society of Super-Villains #16-17, but the title was canceled before it could be published. It eventually appeared in issue #2 of Cancelled Comic Cavalcade, a limited series produced by DC Comics.

Quakemaster takes to hanging out with other villains who have apparently fallen on hard times. This group includes Black Mass, Sonar, Blackrock, and Cavalier. The villains gather at a New York bar to play games of poker. In one such game, the villains lose most of their weapons and devices to civilian Wally Tortelloni. When the villains gang up to track Tortelloni down and retake their devices, they are apprehended by members of the Justice League International.

In Infinite Crisis, Quakemaster rejoins the Secret Society of Super Villains.

== Powers and abilities ==
Quakemaster has no inherent powers or abilities. He uses a power-charged jackhammer of his own design, which projects pulse waves of energy capable of destroying concrete or smashing bone.

== Other versions ==
For a brief time, the name Quakemaster is used by fellow villain Ventriloquist during the storyline "Batman: Cataclysm".
