= The Transmutation of Ike Garuda =

- Cover of the 1st issue.

Publication information
- Publisher: Epic Comics
- Format: Prestige format mini-series
- Genre: Science fiction
- Publication date: July 1991 – January 1992
- No. of issues: 2

Creative team
- Created by: Elaine Lee
- Written by: Elaine Lee
- Artist: James Sherman

The Transmutation of Ike Garuda is a two-issue prestige format mini-series published by the Epic Comics imprint of Marvel Comics, with the first issue being released in 1991 and the second issue in 1992. It was written by Elaine Lee, with art by James Sherman.

Like some of Elaine Lee's other work, The Transmutation of Ike Garuda is science fiction of the noir space opera genre.

== Setting ==
The Transmutation of Ike Garuda is set in a future in which interstellar spaceflight transportation has been obsoleted by the Galactic Access System (abbreviated G.A.S.), an interstellar transportation system that uses teleportation devices called wombs that function in a way similar to the transporters of Star Trek. Wombs are not entirely reliable: luggage is frequently lost, and, less commonly, people are lost as well (it is also implied that the Tranzit Authority may deliberately "lose" its enemies, thereby assassinating them). Furthermore, a few planets, like New Saxon, are off-line, meaning that, for unknown (at least, at the beginning of the story) reasons, they cannot be reached by G.A.S.

The universe is dominated by four organizations:

- the G.A.S. Tranzit Authority (abbreviated T.A.), the most powerful megacorp in the universe due to its monopoly over G.A.S.
- Diamond Minds (abbreviated D.M.), a smaller megacorp, rival to the Tranzit Authority; it specializes in mind-related technologies and controls a planet also known as Diamond Minds
- Cybertronics Systems (abbreviated Cy-Systems), a megacorp specializing in cyberware and organ growing
- Hermeeze Elite (abbreviated Hermeeze or Elite), a very reliable courier service whose Grade A couriers may be trusted to safeguard the messages they carry with their lives

Some terms are different from modern-day usage. Computers are known as brain-banks, or more simply, as brains or banks. The calendar uses, instead of years, periods of time known as kics or kiks (the spelling differs through the comic).

== Plot synopsis ==
Private detective Ike Garuda is called in by Diamond Minds, ostensibly to investigate the theft of a prototype of one of its experimental technologies, a sending platform or soloflight transport device. As Garuda investigates, he learns that rather than being involved in a simple industrial espionage case, he is actually caught up in a deeper and much more complex conspiracy that threatens to upset the balance of power in the universe.

== Characters ==
Characters, in order of their appearance or mention in The Transmutation of Ike Garuda, with descriptions of whom they apparently are when they are first introduced (by the end of the story, many of the characters are revealed to be something other than what they initially seemed):

- Ike Garuda, the protagonist, a private detective who has had some of his memories artificially erased against his will
- Frankie Pongo, a Grade B (second-rate) courier sent by Jim Diamond to meet Garuda when Garuda arrives on Diamond Minds
- Jim Diamond, owner of Diamond Minds, who hires Garuda
- Lark Diamond, daughter of Jim Diamond and manager of Diamond Minds, who deals with Garuda on her father's behalf
- Barry Reasoner, a stuttering engineer who witnessed the robbery of the sending platform
- Billy Argent, head of Cybertronics Systems, dying of a degenerative disease
- an unnamed Ontean, an alien from the off-line planet Onté who desperately wants to return home, working as a supervisor for the Tranzit Authority
- Maera Lethe, a Tranzit Authority agent and interrogator-through-torture who has history with Garuda
- Lark Too, a biodroid copy of Lark Diamond
- Lirren Vyne, owner of the pleasure planet Vyne's World, a member of the three-sexed Rhodbydysawd
- Eddie Argent, nephew and representative of Billy Argent
- Director Paloma, a representative of the Tranzit Authority
- Xavier Swann, head of Hermeeze Elite, living on his generation spaceship (or gen ship, for short) Swannsong
- Lekbah, a Grade A Hermeeze Elite courier working for Xavier Swann
- Boote, Xavier Swann's guard, born in and adapted for low-gravity environments
- Jerry Diamond, Jim Diamond's cousin

== Themes ==
The Transmutation of Ike Garuda explores a number of science fiction existential themes and asks bioethical questions, such as whether a person who enters a womb has the same identity as the same person reconstituted in a womb on another planet, and whether biodroid copies are just as real as the people on whom they are based.

== See also ==
- Starstruck
