= Batma =

Batma is a Moroccan surname. Notable people with the surname include:

- Dounia Batma (born 1991), Moroccan singer
- Khansa Batma (born 1979), Moroccan singer and actress
- Larbi Batma (1948–1997), Moroccan musician, poet, singer, author, and actor
- Mohamed Batma (1952–2001), Moroccan lyricist, composer and singer
