= Superman's Pal Jimmy Olsen =

Comic book series

- Cover of Superman's Pal Jimmy Olsen #1, art by Curt Swan and Stan Kaye.

Publication information
- Publisher: DC Comics
- Schedule: List: (vol. 1) Bimonthly and later Monthly (vol. 2) Monthly
- Format: Ongoing
- Publication date: List: (vol. 1) September–October 1954 – March 1974 (vol. 2) July 14, 2019 – July 17, 2020
- No. of issues: List: (vol. 1) 163 (vol. 2) 12
- Main character: Jimmy Olsen

Creative team
- Written by: List: (vol. 1) Robert Bernstein, Otto Binder, Leo Dorfman, Jack Kirby, Jerry Siegel (vol. 2) Matt Fraction
- Penciller: List: Pete Costanza, Jack Kirby, George Papp, Kurt Schaffenberger, Curt Swan
- Inker: List: Murphy Anderson, Ray Burnley, Vince Colletta, Pete Costanza, John Forte, Stan Kaye, George Klein, Al Plastino (vol. 2) Steve Lieber

Collected editions
- Jimmy Olsen: Adventures by Jack Kirby, Volume 1: ISBN 1-56389-984-1
- Jimmy Olsen: Adventures by Jack Kirby, Volume 2: ISBN 1401202594
- The Amazing Transformations of Jimmy Olsen: ISBN 1401213693
- Jack Kirby's Fourth World Omnibus, Vol. 1: ISBN 1401213448

Superman's Pal Jimmy Olsen is an American comic book series published by DC Comics from September–October 1954 until March 1974, spanning a total of 163 issues. Featuring the adventures of Superman supporting character Jimmy Olsen, it contains stories often of a humorous nature.

A second Superman's Pal, Jimmy Olsen series, written by Matt Fraction and drawn by Steve Lieber, was published between 2019 and 2020.

== Publication history ==
The 1952 television series Adventures of Superman co-starred actor Jack Larson, who appeared regularly as Jimmy Olsen. Largely because of the popularity of Larson and his portrayal of the character, National Comics Publications (DC Comics) decided to create a regular title featuring Jimmy as the leading character, which debuted with a September–October 1954 cover date. Curt Swan was the main artist on the series for its first decade.

Superman's Pal Jimmy Olsen saw strong sales, selling an average of 498,000 copies of each issue in 1960, which was well behind top-selling series such as Uncle Scrooge and Superman but ahead of other widely recognized series such as Detective Comics, Wonder Woman, and even Action Comics, which starred Superman himself. The series's success prompted DC to introduce a second title which revolves around a supporting character, Superman's Girl Friend, Lois Lane, in 1958.

Lucy Lane was introduced in issue #36 (April 1959) and became the primary romantic interest of Jimmy Olsen for the run of the series. In an "Imaginary Story" seen in issue #57, he marries Supergirl (Kara Zor-El/Linda Lee Danvers) after she loses both her powers and memories of being Supergirl, only for her to recover her powers and memories after their marriage; once she lets him know that she is Supergirl, he is perfectly happy with it. She was also the anonymous "Miss X" whom Jimmy kissed in issue #44 to break the spell that turned him into a werewolf.

Early issues of Superman's Pal Jimmy Olsen had few fantasy elements and typically focused on Jimmy trying to do his job as a reporter, but towards the end of the 1950s most of the stories used bizarre premises and frequently involved Jimmy undergoing supernatural transformations. Jimmy acting like a jerk and turning on his friends was a common motif, to the extent that DC published an 80-page giant size issue (Superman's Pal Jimmy Olsen #113) which consisted of reprints of the best "Jimmy Olsen betrays Superman" stories.

When Jack Kirby began working at DC in 1970, he insisted on taking on this title since it was the lowest-selling in the publishing line and without assigned talent at the time, so he would not cost someone their job. Kirby's first issue was #133 (August 1970), and made a very clear break between the old style and the new.

During his run, Kirby introduced the Fourth World's New Gods, Darkseid, Project Cadmus and Transilvane. He also reintroduced the Newsboy Legion and the Guardian. The faces of the Superman and Jimmy Olsen figures drawn by Kirby were redrawn by Al Plastino or Murphy Anderson. Comedian Don Rickles guest starred in a two-part story by Kirby in issues #139 and #141. Kirby left the series with issue #148 (April 1972).

Lucy Lane was believed to have died in Superman's Girl Friend, Lois Lane #120 (March 1972) but was revived in a story in Superman's Pal Jimmy Olsen #160 (October 1973). Nick Cardy was the cover artist for Superman's Pal Jimmy Olsen for issues #154-163.

Following Kirby's departure from the series, sales floundered slightly. Superman's Pal Jimmy Olsen, Superman's Girl Friend, Lois Lane and the short-lived Supergirl title (launched in 1972) ended in 1974 by merging into the new omnibus title The Superman Family. The new series continued the numbering from Superman's Pal Jimmy Olsen. Superman Family was canceled in 1982, ending with issue #222.

A Superman's Pal Jimmy Olsen special one-shot was published in December 2008, following on from the "Atlas" storyline, and leading into Superman: New Krypton.

Superman's Pal Jimmy Olsen was revived for a well-received 12-issue maxiseries beginning in September 2019.

== Jimmy's transformations ==
Many of the issues include Jimmy undergoing some form of transformation. These include:

- Speed Demon - In a story published in 1956, a month before the debut of Barry Allen as the new Flash, Jimmy drinks a potion produced by a Professor Claude and gains super-speed.
- Jimmy the Imp - A prankster imp vision of Jimmy.
- Colossal Olsen - A Colossal Kid version of Jimmy Olsen.
- Radioactivity - After being exposed to a radioactive substance, Jimmy begins to irradiate everything in his presence.
- Super-Brain - Jimmy evolves into a "man of the future" with superhuman mental powers.
- Monstrous beard growth - The machinations of the sinister Beard Band cause Jimmy to grow an immense beard.
- Gorilla - When Jimmy switches minds with a gorilla, he goes about his reporting duties as a gorilla in Jimmy's clothes.
- Elastic Lad - Jimmy, by serum or by alien virus can sometimes stretch himself, akin to the recently reintroduced Plastic Man. As Elastic Lad, Jimmy is inducted as an Honorary Member of the Legion of Super-Heroes.
- Alien-form - Aliens transform Jimmy into a telepathic Jovian for a week. This turns out to be a Jovian week which is much shorter than an Earth week, about 70 hours (slightly less than three days).
- Fire-Breather - An accident involving an experiment gives Jimmy fire-breath.
- Human octopus - After eating an extraterrestrial fruit, Jimmy grows four extra arms. According to Superman, this is actually a hallucination, but Jimmy suspects that Superman said this to teach him a lesson since Jimmy had foolishly ignored advice from Superman that would have saved him a lot of trouble.
- Genie - Jimmy finds a genie's lamp and is tricked into replacing its villainous occupant.
- Wolf-Man - In the vein of the 1957 film I Was a Teenage Werewolf, Jimmy is transformed into a werewolf in a 1961 story.
- Woman - Jimmy goes undercover dressed as a woman in #44, #67, #84, and #159.
- Morbidly Obese - Jimmy gets fat in an attempt to stop a jewel smuggler and to impress a Circus Fat Lady.
- Giant Turtle Man - One of Jimmy's most frequently cited transformations is his turning into a giant turtle man.
- Human porcupine - Jimmy transforms after rejecting the romantic advances of an imp from the Fifth Dimension.
- Bizarro Jimmy - Although Jimmy has a counterpart on Bizarro World, he is turned into a Bizarro himself.
- Hippie - While investigating a colony of hippies at "Guru Kama's Dream Pad", Jimmy grows a beard and participated in a mock "hate-in". On the cover of this story's issue, Jimmy is wielding a sign that says "Superman is a freak-out!"
- Viking - Jimmy puts on Viking armor and mistakenly believes he has been transported 1,000 years backward in time.

== In other media ==
- In 1959, the producers of the action/adventure series Adventures of Superman were hit by a snag as to how to continue the series after series star George Reeves had died that summer from a gunshot wound. Jack Larson, who played Jimmy in the series, was approached with the idea of continuing the franchise as a spin-off for two new seasons of 26 episodes each to begin airing in 1960. Titled Superman's Pal Jimmy Olsen, it would focus on a more serious angle of Olsen's rising career as a reporter and journalist with Larson reprising his role. In place of Reeves, stock footage of Superman flying and a look-alike stunt double would be used to play the Man of Steel. Larson rejected the proposal, and the project went unmade.
- In the My Adventures with Superman episode "Mobile Suit Toyman", Jimmy starts his own comic book series titled Superman's Pal Jimmy Olsen. Throughout the third season, various elements of the series are referenced such as Jimmy being turned into a werewolf by Giganta, and a turtle by Doctor Poison. Starting with her first appearance in season 2, Supergirl's romance with Jimmy from the comic series becomes a subplot in the series.

== Collected editions ==
- Showcase Presents: Superman Family
  - Volume 1 includes Superman's Pal Jimmy Olsen #1–22, 576 pages, March 2006, ISBN 1-4012-0787-1
  - Volume 2 includes Superman's Pal Jimmy Olsen #23–34, 520 pages, February 2008, ISBN 1-4012-1656-0
  - Volume 3 includes Superman's Pal Jimmy Olsen #35–44, 576 pages, March 2009, ISBN 1-4012-2188-2
  - Volume 4 includes Superman's Pal Jimmy Olsen #45–53, 520 pages, March 2013, ISBN 1-4012-3837-8
- Superman: The Amazing Transformations of Jimmy Olsen includes stories from Superman's Pal Jimmy Olsen #22, 28, 31–33, 41–42, 44, 49, 53, 59, 65, 72, 80, 85, and 105, 192 pages, July 2007, ISBN 1-4012-1369-3
- Showcase Presents: Supergirl Volume 1 includes Superman's Pal Jimmy Olsen #40, 46, and 51, 528 pages, November 2007, ISBN 1-4012-1717-6
- Superman: The Bottle City of Kandor includes Superman's Pal Jimmy Olsen #53 and 69, 200 pages, October 2007, ISBN 978-1401214654
- DC's Greatest Imaginary Stories, Vol. 1 includes Superman's Pal Jimmy Olsen #57, 192 pages, September 2005, ISBN 978-1401205348
- Legion of Super-Heroes Archives
  - Volume 2 includes Superman's Pal Jimmy Olsen #72, 224 pages, 1992, ISBN 1563890577
  - Volume 3 includes Superman's Pal Jimmy Olsen #76, 224 pages, 1993, ISBN 1563891026
  - Volume 7 includes Superman's Pal Jimmy Olsen #106, 240 pages, May 1998, ISBN 1563893983
- Jimmy Olsen: Adventures by Jack Kirby
  - Volume 1, collects Superman's Pal Jimmy Olsen #133–139, and 141, 160 pages, August 2003, ISBN 1-56389-984-1
  - Volume 2, collects Superman's Pal Jimmy Olsen #142–148, 192 pages, December 2004, ISBN 1-4012-0259-4
- Jack Kirby's Fourth World Omnibus
  - Volume 1 includes Superman's Pal Jimmy Olsen #133–139, 396 pages, May 2007, ISBN 1-4012-1344-8
  - Volume 2 includes Superman's Pal Jimmy Olsen #141–145, 396 pages, August 2007, ISBN 1-4012-1357-X
  - Volume 3 includes Superman's Pal Jimmy Olsen #146–148, 396 pages, November 2007, ISBN 1-4012-1485-1
- Countdown Special: Jimmy Olsen #1 (January 2008): collects Superman's Pal Jimmy Olsen #136 and #147–148.

== See also ==
- Jack Kirby bibliography
- Superman's Girl Friend, Lois Lane
- The Superman Family
