= The Brave and the Bold =

American comic book series

- Cover of The Brave and the Bold #1 (August–September 1955), art by Russ Heath, Joe Kubert, and Irv Novick.

Publication information
- Publisher: DC Comics
- Schedule: Bimonthly (#1–117); Monthly (#118–200)
- Format: (vol. 1 and 3); Ongoing series (Flash and Green Lantern:...); Limited series
- Publication date: (vol. 1); August–September 1955 – July 1983 (vol. 2); December 1991 – June 1992 (Flash and Green Lantern:...); October 1999 – March 2000 (vol. 3); April 2007 – August 2010
- No. of issues: (vol. 1): 200 (vol. 2 and Flash and Green Lantern:...): 6 each (vol. 3): 35
- Main character(s): (vol. 1); Many characters until Batman and a rotation of DC Universe characters with #50 (vol. 2); Green Arrow, the Question, and the Butcher (Flash and Green Lantern:...); Flash, Green Lantern (vol. 3); Rotating characters from the DCU

Creative team
- Written by: List: (vol. 1) Cary Burkett, Gardner Fox, Bob Haney, Robert Kanigher (vol. 2) Mike Grell and Mike Baron (Flash and Green Lantern:...) Mark Waid (vol. 3) Mark Waid Marv Wolfman J. Michael Straczynski
- Penciller: List: (vol. 1) Neal Adams, Ross Andru, Jim Aparo, Nick Cardy, Ramona Fradon, Russ Heath, Joe Kubert, Bruno Premiani, Mike Sekowsky, Dan Spiegle (vol. 2) Shea Pensa (Flash and Green Lantern:...) Barry Kitson (vol. 3) George Pérez, Jerry Ordway, Scott Kolins, Phil Winslade, Doug Braithwaite, Jesus Saiz
- Inker: List: (vol. 1) Vince Colletta, Mike Esposito, Dick Giordano

Collected editions
- The Brave and the Bold Team-Up Archives, Vol. 1: ISBN 1-4012-0405-8
- The Brave and the Bold, vol. 1: The Lords of Luck: ISBN 1-4012-1588-2
- The Brave and the Bold, vol. 2: The Book of Destiny: ISBN 1-4012-1861-X
- The Brave and the Bold, vol. 3: Demons and Dragons: ISBN 1-4012-2190-4
- The Brave and the Bold, vol. 4: Without Sin: ISBN 1-4012-2286-2

The Brave and the Bold is a comic book series published by the comic book publishing company DC Comics as an ongoing series from 1955 to 1983. It was followed by a reprint miniseries in 1988, two original miniseries in 1991 and 1999, and was revived as an ongoing anthology title in 2007 and 2023. The focus of the series has varied over time, and it sometimes featured team-ups of characters from across the DC Universe. From 1965-1983, starting with issue #74, it was exclusively a Batman team-up book.

== Publication history ==
=== Volume 1 ===
The first volume of the series ran for 200 issues from August/September 1955 to July 1983. Originally, The Brave and the Bold was an anthology series featuring adventure tales from past ages with characters such as the Silent Knight, the Viking Prince, the Golden Gladiator, and Robin Hood. With issue #25, the series was reinvented as a try-out title for new characters and concepts, starting with the Suicide Squad, created by writer Robert Kanigher and artist Ross Andru. Gardner Fox and Joe Kubert created a new version of Hawkman in issue #34 (February–March 1961) with the character receiving his own title three years later.

Editor Julius Schwartz hired Gardner Fox and artist Mike Sekowsky to create the Justice League of America. The team debuted in The Brave and the Bold #28 (February–March 1960), and after two further appearances in the title received its own series.

Issues #45 through #49 (Dec. 1962/Jan. 1963 through Aug./Sept. 1963) were devoted to "Strange Sports Stories", combining sport and science-fiction in tales such as "Challenge of the Headless Baseball Team" and "The Man Who Drove Through Time". Ten years later, in 1973, Strange Sports Stories was resurrected as a DC Comics title in its own right, but it lasted only six issues.

The series was changed yet again with issue #50 as a team-up title between established characters. Starting with issue #59 The Brave and the Bold began to frequently feature a Batman team-up. This was due to the popularity of the Batman television series. From issue #74 to the end of its run, The Brave and the Bold was exclusively a Batman team-up title.

The teaming of Robin, Kid Flash, and Aqualad in issue #54 (June - July 1964) by writer Bob Haney and artist Bruno Premiani led to the creation of the Teen Titans. The three heroes subsequently appeared under the name "Teen Titans" in issue #60 (June–July 1965) by Haney and artist Nick Cardy and were joined by Wonder Woman's younger sister Wonder Girl in her first appearance.

Metamorpho was created by Haney and artist Ramona Fradon in The Brave and the Bold #57 (December 1964–January 1965).

The title was the first to feature Neal Adams' version of Batman, generating fan interest that led to Adams' style defining the modern Batman image to this day. In addition, Adams updated Green Arrow's visual appearance by designing a new costume for the character in issue #85 (August–September 1969). The primary artist for the second half of the run was Jim Aparo, starting with #98 (October - November 1971). Haney frequently disregarded continuity by scripting stories which contradicted DC's canon or by writing major heroes in an out-of-character fashion. Issue #100 (Feb.-March 1972) featured Batman and "4 Famous Co-Stars" (Green Lantern, Green Arrow, Black Canary, and Robin) in a story by Haney and Aparo. Issues #112 (April - May 1974) to #117 (Feb.-March 1975) of the series were in the 100 Page Super Spectacular format.

The character Nemesis, also known as Thomas Tresser, debuted in an eight-page backup story in issue #166 (September 1980) written by Cary Burkett and drawn by Dan Spiegle. The Tresser character was created by Burkett in 1979, and named for an actor with whom Burkett was rooming in New Hampshire.

Alan Brennert wrote four issues of The Brave and the Bold featuring Batman teaming with the Creeper, Hawk and Dove, the Robin of Earth-Two, and the Catwoman.

The title's final issue featured a team-up of the Batmen of Earth-One and Earth-Two and included a preview of Batman and the Outsiders, the title that replaced The Brave and the Bold on DC's schedule and became Aparo's next regular assignment.

=== Full list of issues ===
Issue #	Character	Notes
1–24	Golden Gladiator, Viking Prince, Silent Knight, and Robin Hood	Steady rotation of two or three of these characters per issue.
25–27	Suicide Squad	First appearance of the Suicide Squad.
28–30	Justice League of America	First appearance of the Justice League of America.
31–33	Cave Carson	First appearance of Cave Carson.
34–36	Hawkman & Hawkgirl	First Silver Age appearance of Hawkman and Hawkgirl.
37–39	Suicide Squad	
40–41	Cave Carson	
42–44	Hawkman and Hawkgirl	
45–49	Strange Sports Stories	
50	Green Arrow and Martian Manhunter	First team-up issue of the series.
51	Aquaman and Hawkman	
52	Sgt. Rock, Johnny Cloud, and Haunted Tank	
53	The Atom and the Flash	
54	Kid Flash, Aqualad, and Robin	First appearance of the then-unnamed Teen Titans.
55	The Metal Men and the Atom	
56	The Flash and Martian Manhunter	
57–58	Metamorpho	First appearance of Metamorpho the Element Man.
59	Batman and Green Lantern	
60	Teen Titans	First appearance of Wonder Girl.
61–62	Starman and Black Canary	
63	Supergirl and Wonder Woman	
64	Batman and Eclipso	Billed as "Batman Versus Eclipso" due to the hero/villain status of Eclipso at the time.
65	The Flash and the Doom Patrol	
66	Metamorpho and the Metal Men	
67	Batman and the Flash	
68	Batman and Metamorpho	Batman becomes a Bat-Hulk for a time in this issue.
69	Batman and Green Lantern	
70	Batman and Hawkman	
71	Batman and Green Arrow	
72	The Spectre and the Flash	
73	Aquaman and the Atom	First appearance of Vulko.
74	The Metal Men	First issue with Batman as the recurring headliner character, teaming with the co-star(s) listed.
75	The Spectre	
76	Plastic Man	First Silver Age appearance of Plastic Man.
77	The Atom	
78	Wonder Woman and Batgirl	First appearance of Copperhead.
79	Deadman	First issue drawn by Neal Adams.
80	The Creeper	First appearance of Hellgrammite.
81	The Flash	
82	Aquaman	
83	Teen Titans	
84	Sgt. Rock	
85	Green Arrow	First appearance of Green Arrow in his redesigned look.
86	Deadman	
87	Wonder Woman	
88	Wildcat	First Silver/Bronze Age appearance of Wildcat.
89	The Phantom Stranger	
90	Adam Strange	
91	Black Canary	
92	The Bat-Squad	First (and to date, only) appearance of the Bat-Squad.
93	The House of Mystery	
94	Teen Titans	
95	Plastic Man	Cover advertises co-star as a surprise.
96	Sgt. Rock	
97	Wildcat	
98	The Phantom Stranger	First issue drawn by Jim Aparo, who would become main artist.
99	The Flash	
100	Robin, Green Arrow, Green Lantern, and Black Canary	
101	Metamorpho	
102	Teen Titans	
103	The Metal Men	
104	Deadman	
105	Wonder Woman	
106	Green Arrow	
107	Black Canary	
108	Sgt. Rock	
109	The Demon Etrigan	
110	Wildcat	
111	The Joker	Like the earlier Eclipso "team-up," it became adversarial.
112	Mister Miracle	First of a series of DC 100 Page Super Spectacular issues (mostly reprints with one new lead story).
113	The Metal Men	
114	Aquaman	
115	The Atom	
116	The Spectre	
117	Sgt. Rock	Last of the Super Spectacular reprint issues.
118	Wildcat	Cover states "Co-Starring the Joker."
119	Man-Bat	
120	Kamandi	
121	The Metal Men	
122	Swamp Thing	
123	Plastic Man and Metamorpho	
124	Sgt. Rock	
125	The Flash	
126	Aquaman	
127	Wildcat	
128	Mister Miracle	
129–130	Green Arrow	"Co-Starring the Atom, the Joker, & Two-Face." Two-Face had previously encountered Green Arrow in #106.
131	Wonder Woman	Versus Catwoman.
132	Richard Dragon	First issue of the series with the classic "bullet" DC logo.
133	Deadman	
134	Green Lantern	
135	The Metal Men	
136	Green Arrow and the Metal Men	Follow-up to the previous issue.
137	The Demon Etrigan	
138	Mister Miracle	
139	Hawkman	
140	Wonder Woman	
141	Black Canary	Also featuring the Joker.
142	Aquaman	
143	The Creeper	Two-issue Human Target backup feature begins.
144	Green Arrow	
145	The Phantom Stranger	
146	The Unknown Soldier	
147	Supergirl	
148	Plastic Man	
149	Teen Titans	
150	Superman	Cover advertises co-star as a surprise.
151	The Flash	
152	The Atom	
153	Red Tornado	
154	Metamorpho	
155	Green Lantern	
156	Doctor Fate	
157	Kamandi	
158	Wonder Woman	
159	Ra's al Ghul	
160	Supergirl	
161	Adam Strange	
162	Sgt. Rock	
163	Black Lightning	
164	Hawkman	
165	Man-Bat	
166	Black Canary	First appearance of Nemesis in the backup feature that continued in every issue after unless otherwise noted.
167	Blackhawk	
168	Green Arrow	
169	Zatanna	
170	Nemesis	No backup feature as Batman and Nemesis meet face-to-face.
171	Scalphunter	
172	Firestorm	
173	Guardians of the Universe	
174	Green Lantern	Follow-up to the previous issue.
175	Lois Lane	
176	Swamp Thing	
177	Elongated Man	
178	The Creeper	
179	Legion of Super-Heroes	No Nemesis backup.
180	The Spectre	
181	Hawk and Dove	
182	Robin (Earth-Two)	Also featuring Starman.
183	The Riddler	
184	Huntress	
185	Green Arrow	
186	Hawkman	
187	The Metal Men	Final appearance (death) of Nameless.
188–189	Rose and Thorn	
190	Adam Strange	
191	The Joker	Also featuring the Penguin
192	Superboy	Final issue featuring the Nemesis backup feature.
193	Nemesis	Final appearance of Nemesis within the series.
194	The Flash	
195	I…Vampire	
196	Ragman	
197	Catwoman	Both the Batman and Catwoman in this issue are the Earth-Two versions.
198	Karate Kid	
199	The Spectre	
200	Batman (Earth-Two)	Final issue. Ended to make way for Batman and the Outsiders with the same creative team. Two backup features are included: one of Bat-Mite complaining to editor Len Wein and the other a preview of the Outsiders. First appearances of Halo, Geo-Force, Katana, and the Outsiders.

=== Volume 2 ===
In December 1991 - June 1992, The Brave and the Bold returned as a six-issue miniseries featuring Green Arrow, the Question, and the Butcher. The miniseries was written by Mike Grell and Mike Baron.

=== Flash and Green Lantern: The Brave and the Bold ===
A six-issue miniseries was published from October 1999 - March 2000 starring the Flash and Green Lantern titled Flash and Green Lantern: The Brave and the Bold. This miniseries was written by Mark Waid and Tom Peyer with art by Barry Kitson and Tom Grindberg. A trade paperback of this mini-series was published in 2001 (ISBN 1-56389-708-3).

The title was used again in 2001 for The Brave and the Bold Annual #1 (1969), a one-shot special that reprinted selected Silver Age team-ups. The book was designed in the 1960s-style "80-Page Giant" format as if it were an actual annual issue of the original run of the title, which did not have an annual in 1969.

=== Volume 3 ===
DC resurrected The Brave and the Bold title as another ongoing series in April 2007. Deciding that it would be a random team-up series, and not a Batman team-up series, the first writer was Mark Waid, who remained on the title for its first 16 issues. The first arc, "The Lords of Luck", involved Batman in a team-up with Green Lantern Hal Jordan. The story depicted the characters joining forces with various other characters in tracking down the book of Destiny, with appearances by Supergirl, Lobo, Blue Beetle, the Legion of Super Heroes, Adam Strange, and the Challengers of the Unknown. The second arc picked up threads from the first, but mainly focused on self-contained stories.

After Waid's departure, Marv Wolfman took over for a two-part storyline, involving Supergirl and Raven battling the son of Triumph, while David Hine and Doug Braithwaite did a four-issue arc on the series featuring Hal Jordan and the Phantom Stranger. Following this, Dan Jurgens wrote issue #23, featuring Booster Gold and Magog. Like Wolfman's run, this era was prominent for its team-ups between DC heroes and the characters of Milestone Media. Writer Matt Wayne and artist Howard Porter collaborated on a team-up between Static and Black Lightning, and Adam Beechen and Roger Robinson wrote another featuring Hardware and Blue Beetle. The final Milestone issue was a team-up between Xombi and the Spectre, by John Rozum and Scott Hampton.

In September 2009, the title was taken over by J. Michael Straczynski and artist Jesus Saiz with issue #27, which featured a team-up between Batman and Dial H For Hero. Similar to the Milestone issues, it was intended for Straczynski's run on the series to showcase the Red Circle Comics characters licensed from Archie Comics. This idea was ultimately scrapped. Following the first issue, Straczynski wrote team-ups between: Barry Allen and Blackhawk; the Joker and the Atom; Hal Jordan and Doctor Fate; Batman and Brother Power the Geek; Aquaman and Etrigan the Demon; and Barbara Gordon, Wonder Woman, and Zatanna, which served as a companion piece to Alan Moore's Batman: The Killing Joke graphic novel.

=== Batman: The Brave and the Bold Volume 1 ===
DC published a 22 issue comic book adaptation of the animated series Batman: The Brave and the Bold from 2009-2010. In 2010 it was followed by a 16 issue series titled All New Batman: The Brave and the Bold.

=== Batman and Wonder Woman ===
In 2018, DC released a limited series starring Batman and Wonder Woman.

=== The Doomed and the Damned ===
In October 2020, DC released an 80-Page Giant called The Doomed and the Damned.

=== Batman: The Brave and the Bold Volume 2 ===
In May 2023, DC Comics released a fourth volume of the anthology series in entitled Batman: The Brave and the Bold, as a part of the "Dawn of DC" initiative. The series includes stories centered around Batman and other Gotham City-based characters, in addition other DC Universe superheroes. The first issue is 64-pages and features four stories by creators including Tom King, Mitch Gerads, Guillem March, Gabriel Hardman, Dan Mora, and Rob Williams.

== Collected editions ==
- Batman: The Brave and the Bold—The Bronze Age Omnibus
  - Vol. 1 collects The Brave and the Bold #74-109. 904 pages, January 2017, ISBN 978-1401267186
  - Vol. 2 collects The Brave and the Bold #110-156. 776 pages, September 2018, ISBN 978-1401281670
  - Vol. 3 collects The Brave and the Bold #157-200. 904 pages, September 2021, ISBN 978-1401292829
- The Viking Prince by Joe Kubert collects The Brave and the Bold #1-5 and 7-24, 296 pages, July 2010, ISBN 978-1-4012-2777-7
- The Greatest 1950s Stories Ever Told includes The Brave And The Bold #3, 288 pages, October 1990, 9780930289805
- Justice League Of America: A Celebration Of 60 Years includes The Brave And The Bold #28, 464 pages, April 2020, 9781401299514
- Showcase Presents: Justice League of America Volume 1 includes The Brave and the Bold #28–30, 544 pages, December 2005, ISBN 1-4012-0761-8
- Suicide Squad: The Silver Age collects The Brave and the Bold #25–27 and #37–39, 336 pages, July 2016, ISBN 1-4012-6343-7
- The Hawkman Archives Vol. 1 includes The Brave And The Bold #34, 35, 36, 42, 43 and 44, 240 pages, May 2000, 9781563896118
- Hawkman includes The Brave And The Bold #34, 35, 36, 42, 43 and 44, 160 pages, January 1991, 9780930289423
- Showcase Presents: Hawkman
  - Volume 1 includes The Brave and the Bold #34–36, #42–44, and 51, 560 pages, March 2007, ISBN 1-4012-1280-8
  - Volume 2 includes The Brave and the Bold #70, 560 pages, August 2008, ISBN 978-1-4012-1817-1
- Showcase Presents: Green Arrow Volume 1 includes The Brave and the Bold #50, #71, #85, 528 pages, January 2006, ISBN 1-4012-0785-5
- The Brave and the Bold Team-Up Archives Volume 1 collects The Brave and the Bold #50–56, #59, 224 pages, June 2005, ISBN 1-4012-0405-8
- Showcase Presents: Aquaman
  - Volume 2 includes The Brave and the Bold #51, 528 pages, January 2008, ISBN 1-4012-1712-5
  - Volume 3 includes The Brave and the Bold #73, 448 pages, February 2009, ISBN 1-4012-2181-5
- Showcase Presents: Haunted Tank Volume 1 includes The Brave and the Bold #52, 560 pages, May 2006, ISBN 1-4012-0789-8
- The Greatest Team-Up Stories Ever Told includes The Brave And The Bold #53, 54 and 178, 288 pages, October 1989, 9780930289515
- Silver Age Teen Titans Archives Vol. 1 includes The Brave And The Bold #54 and 60, 204 pages, August 2003, 9781401200718
- Teen Titans: A Celebration Of 50 Years includes The Brave And The Bold #54, 400 pages, November 2014, 9781401251772
- Showcase Presents: The Teen Titans
  - Volume 1 includes The Brave and the Bold #54 and #60, 528 pages, April 2006, ISBN 1-4012-0788-X
  - Volume 2 includes The Brave and the Bold #83 and #94, 512 pages, October 2007, ISBN 1-4012-1252-2
- Showcase Presents: Metal Men
  - Volume 1 includes The Brave and the Bold #55, 528 pages, September 2007, ISBN 1-4012-1559-9
  - Volume 2 includes The Brave and the Bold #66, 528 pages, September 2008, ISBN 1-4012-1976-4
- Showcase Presents: Metamorpho Volume 1 collects The Brave and the Bold #57–58, #66, and #68, 560 pages, October 2005, ISBN 1-4012-0762-6
- Showcase Presents: The Brave and the Bold – The Batman Team-Ups
  - Volume 1 collects The Brave and the Bold #59, #64, #67, #69–71, #74–87, 528 pages, January 2007, ISBN 1-4012-1209-3
  - Volume 2 collects The Brave and the Bold #88–108, 528 pages, December 2007, ISBN 1-4012-1675-7
  - Volume 3 collects The Brave and the Bold #109–134, 520 pages, December 2008, ISBN 1-4012-1985-3
- Crisis On Multiple Earths: The Team-Ups Vol. 1 includes The Brave And The Bold #61, 224 pages, December 2005, 9781401204709
- Crisis On Multiple Earths: The Team-Ups Vol. 2 includes The Brave And The Bold #62, 200 pages, March 2007, ISBN 9781401212285
- Black Canary Archives Volume 1 includes The Brave and the Bold #61–62, 224 pages, December 2000, ISBN 1-56389-734-2
- Showcase Presents: The Spectre Volume 1 includes The Brave and the Bold #72, 75, 116, 180, and 199, 616 pages, April 2012, ISBN 1-4012-3417-8
- The Spectre: The Wrath of the Spectre Omnibus includes The Brave and the Bold #72, 75, 116, 180, and 199; 680 pages, September 2020, ISBN 978-1779502933
- Showcase Presents: Batgirl Vol. 1 includes The Brave And The Bold #78, 548 pages, July 2007, 9781401213671
- Batman Illustrated by Neal Adams Vol. 1 includes The Brave And The Bold #79, 80, 81, 82, 83, 84 and 85, 240 pages, September 2003, 9781401200411
- Deadman Omnibus includes The Brave and the Bold #79, 86, 104, and 133; 944 pages, December 2020, ISBN 978-1779504883
- Green Arrow: A Celebration Of 75 Years includes The Brave And The Bold #85, 500 pages, June 2016, 9781401263867
- Batman Illustrated by Neal Adams Vol. 2 includes The Brave And The Bold #86 and 93, 236 pages, June 2004, 9781401238360
- Diana Prince: Wonder Woman Vol. 2 includes The Brave And The Bold #87, 208 pages, July 2008, 9781845769000
- Batman/Wildcat includes The Brave And The Bold #88, 97, 110, 118 and 127, 278 pages, May 2017, 9781401267278
- Showcase Presents: The Phantom Stranger Vol. 2 includes The Brave And The Bold #89 and 98, 496 pages, March 2008, 9781401217228
- The Phantom Stranger Omnibus collects #89, 98, and 145; 1,184 pages, May 2022, ISBN 978-1779506030
- Legends of the Dark Knight: Jim Aparo
  - Volume 1 collects The Brave and the Bold #98, 100–102, and 104–122, 512 pages, April 2012, ISBN 978-1-4012-3375-4
  - Volume 2 collects The Brave and the Bold #123-145 and 147–151, 528 pages, October 2013, ISBN 978-1401242961
  - Volume 3 collects The Brave and the Bold #152, 154–178, 180–182, 552 pages, September 2017, ISBN 978-1401271619
- Diana Prince: Wonder Woman Vol. 4 includes The Brave And The Bold #105, 175 pages, February 2009, ISBN 9781401221508
- Two-Face: A Celebration Of 75 Years includes The Brave And The Bold #106, 384 pages, November 2017, 9781401274382
- The Greatest Joker Stories Ever Told includes The Brave And The Bold #111, 288 pages, December 1988, 9780930289362
- Joker: The Bronze Age Omnibus includes The Brave and the Bold #111, 118, 129-130, 141, 191; 832 pages, August 2019, ISBN 978-1401293406
- Batman: The Strange Deaths of Batman includes The Brave and the Bold #115, 160 pages, January 2009, ISBN 978-1-4012-2174-4
- Tales of the Batman: Don Newton includes The Brave and the Bold #153, 156 and 165, 360 pages, December 2011, ISBN 978-1-4012-3294-8
- Tales of the Batman: Gerry Conway Volume 1 includes The Brave and the Bold #158, 161, 171–174; 464 pages, July 2017, ISBN 978-1401272555
- Batman Arkham: Ra's al Ghul includes The Brave and the Bold #159, March 2019, 232 pages, ISBN 978-1401288815
- Batman: King Tut's Tomb includes The Brave And The Bold #164 and 171, 126 pages, February 2010, 9781401225773
- Legends of the Dark Knight: José Luis García-López includes The Brave and the Bold #164 and 171, November 2021, 472 pages, ISBN 978-1779505804
- Tales Of The Batman: Marv Wolfman Vol. 1 includes The Brave And The Bold #167, 392 pages, March 2020, 9781401299613
- Tales Of The Batman: Carmine Infantino includes The Brave And The Bold #172, 183, 190 and 194; 517 pages, May 2014, 9781401247553
- Swamp Thing: The Bronze Age Vol. 2 includes The Brave And The Bold #176, 448 pages, January 2020, 9781401294229
- Tales of the Batman: Alan Brennert includes The Brave and the Bold #178, 181–182, 197; 208 pages, July 2016, ISBN 978-1401263492
- Batman: Secrets of the Batcave includes The Brave and the Bold #182, 192 pages, August 2007, ISBN 978-1-4012-1370-1
- Batman Arkham: The Riddler includes The Brave and the Bold #183, 296 pages, May 2015, ISBN 978-1401255138
- Batman: The Greatest Stories Ever Told Vol. 2 includes The Brave And The Bold #184, 208 pages, February 2007, 9781401212148
- The Greatest Batman Stories Ever Told includes The Brave and the Bold #197, 360 pages, December 1988, ISBN 978-0-930289-35-5
- DC Through the 80s: The End of Eras includes The Brave and the Bold #200, 520 pages, December 2020, ISBN 978-1779500878
- Showcase Presents: Batman and the Outsiders Volume 1 includes the backup story from The Brave and the Bold #200, 552 pages, September 2007, ISBN 1-4012-1546-7
- Batman and the Outsiders Volume 1 includes the backup story from The Brave and the Bold #200, 368 pages, February 2017, ISBN 978-1401268121
- The Brave and the Bold
  - Volume 1: The Lords of Luck collects The Brave and the Bold vol. 3 #1–6, 160 pages, December 2007, ISBN 1-4012-1503-3
  - Volume 2: The Book of Destiny collects The Brave and the Bold vol. 3 #7–12, 160 pages, August 2008, ISBN 1-4012-1838-5
  - Volume 3: Demons and Dragons collects The Brave and the Bold vol. 3 #13–16; The Brave and the Bold #181; The Flash vol. 2 #107; and Impulse #17, 168 pages, April 2009, ISBN 1-4012-2190-4
  - Volume 4: Without Sin collects The Brave and the Bold vol. 3 #17–22, 144 pages, July 2009, ISBN 1-4012-2286-2
  - Volume 5: Milestone collects The Brave and the Bold vol. 3 #24–26; Hardware #16; Static #12; and Xombi #6, 160 pages, February 2010, ISBN 1-4012-2654-X
  - Team-Ups of the Brave and the Bold collects The Brave and the Bold vol. 3 #27–33, 176 pages, August 2011, ISBN 1-4012-2809-7
- Booster Gold: Volume 4: Day of Death includes The Brave and the Bold vol. 3 #23, 160 pages, April 2010, ISBN 1-4012-2643-4

== Awards ==
The series won Alley Awards in 1962 for "Best Single Comic Book Cover" (#42 by Joe Kubert), in 1965 for "Best Comic Book Cover" (#61 by Murphy Anderson), and in 1968 for "Best Full-Length Story" ("Track of the Hook" in #79 by Bob Haney and Neal Adams). Issue #28 of the third series (the Flash and Blackhawk team-up) was nominated for an Eisner Award for "Best Single Issue (Or One-Shot)" in 2010.

== In other media ==
=== The Superman/Aquaman Hour of Adventure ===
An episode of The Superman/Aquaman Hour of Adventure was titled "The Brain, the Brave and the Bold", in which Aquaman battles a supervillain named the "Brain".

=== Justice League ===
The Brave and the Bold was used as the title for a two-part episode of the first season of Justice League. The title refers to the Flash (Wally West) and Green Lantern (John Stewart) characters in connection to the second mini-series featuring Barry Allen and Hal Jordan in the roles.

=== Batman: The Brave and the Bold ===
An animated series based on the Brave and the Bold concept aired from November 14, 2008, to November 18, 2011. The series features Batman teaming with various characters of the DC Universe, much like the first volume of the ongoing series. The tone of the series is markedly lighter than the previous Batman: The Animated Series and The Batman.

=== Arrowverse ===
- The eighth episode of Arrow's third season is titled "The Brave and the Bold". The episode is a crossover with The Flash and features a team-up of the title characters of both series.
- In the crossover "Crisis on Infinite Earths", Lex Luthor calls the team up with him and Marv Novu/The Monitor as "The Brave and The Bold".
