= Superman's Girl Friend, Lois Lane =

American comic book series, 1958–1974

- Cover of Superman's Girl Friend, Lois Lane #1, art by Curt Swan and Stan Kaye.

Publication information
- Publisher: DC Comics
- Schedule: Bimonthly then monthly
- Format: Standard
- Publication date: March/April 1958 – September/October 1974
- No. of issues: 137 plus 2 Annuals
- Main character: Lois Lane

Creative team
- Written by: List: Cary Bates Otto Binder Leo Dorfman Robert Kanigher
- Penciller: List: Ross Andru Irv Novick John Rosenberger Werner Roth Kurt Schaffenberger Curt Swan
- Inker: List: Vince Colletta Mike Esposito Kurt Schaffenberger
- Editor: List: Mort Weisinger #1–104 E. Nelson Bridwell #105–120 Dorothy Woolfolk #121–127 Robert Kanigher #128–137

Superman's Girl Friend, Lois Lane is an American comic book series published monthly by DC Comics. The series focusing on the adventures of Lois Lane began publication with a March/April 1958 cover date and ended its run in September/October 1974, with 137 regular issues and two 80-page Annuals. Following the similar-themed Superman's Pal Jimmy Olsen, Superman's Girl Friend Lois Lane was the second comic series based on a Superman supporting character.

At the peak of its popularity in 1962, Superman's Girl Friend, Lois Lane was the third-best-selling comic book in the United States, surpassed only by Superman and Superboy in sales.

== Publication history ==
Following a tryout in Showcase, DC decided to give Lois Lane her own ongoing series. The comic series focus on Lois' solo adventures, and sometimes with stories centered on Lois' romantic interest in Superman and her attempts to maneuver him into marriage, only to fail due to a comic plot twist. In the early 1960s, Lana Lang made regular guest appearances, generally as Lois' romantic rival. Artist Kurt Schaffenberger drew most of the stories for the first 81 issues of the series, missing only issue #29. Schaffenberger's rendition of Lois Lane became cited by many as the "definitive" version of the character. Singer Pat Boone appeared in issue #9 (May 1959) before starring in his own comic book series. "The Monkey's Paw", a story from issue #42 (July 1963), featured a one-panel appearance, with his costume miscolored, by the defunct Fawcett Comics' Captain Marvel, who was not yet a DC character. The letters page of #113 (October 1971) described it as "strictly a private joke" on the part of former Captain Marvel artist Schaffenberger. The story was reprinted in #104 (October 1970) with the costume coloring corrected. The Catwoman made her first Silver Age appearance in #70 (November 1966). In issue #80 (January 1968), Lois' fashions were updated to a more contemporary look.

By the 1970s, the stories began to reflect growing social awareness: Lois became less fixated on romance and more on current issues. In the controversial story "I Am Curious (Black)!" in #106 (November 1970), Lois uses a machine that allows her to experience racism firsthand as an African American woman. The series saw the debut of the Silver Age heroine "Rose & The Thorn" in a backup feature that ran from #105 (October 1970) through #130 (April 1973). Editor E. Nelson Bridwell had several characters and plot concepts from Jack Kirby's "Fourth World" appear in issues #111–119 (July 1971 – February 1972). Lois' sister, Lucy Lane, was believed to have died in issue #120 (March 1972) but the character was later revived.

In 1974, the title ended, as Superman's Pal Jimmy Olsen had earlier that year. Both would be merged into The Superman Family, which chronologically continued from the elder title, premiering with issue #164 (April–May 1974). The release of the last issue of Superman's Girl Friend, Lois Lane was delayed for several months due to a nationwide paper shortage.

== Other Lois Lane titles ==
The character has appeared in several self-titled miniseries and one-shots including:

- Lois Lane – a two issue limited series published in August and September 1986.
- Superman: Lois Lane – a one-shot published in June 1998 as part of the "Girlfrenzy!" Fifth-week event.
- Flashpoint: Lois Lane and the Resistance – a three-issue limited series published August 2011 – October 2011 as part of the Flashpoint crossover.
- Superman: Lois Lane #1 – a one-shot published in April 2014.
- Lois Lane – a 12-issue limited series by writer Greg Rucka and artist Mike Perkins released in July 2019.

== Collected editions ==
- Showcase Presents: Superman Family
  - Volume 1 includes Showcase #9, 576 pages, March 2006, 1-4012-0787-1.
  - Volume 2 includes Showcase #10 and Superman's Girl Friend, Lois Lane #1–7, 520 pages, February 2008, 1-4012-1656-0.
  - Volume 3 includes Superman's Girl Friend, Lois Lane #8–16, 576 pages, March 2009, 1-4012-2188-2.
  - Volume 4 includes Superman's Girl Friend, Lois Lane #17–26, 520 pages, March 2013, 1-4012-3837-8.
- Superman's Girl Friend, Lois Lane Archives Volume 1 – collects Showcase #9–10 and Superman's Girl Friend, Lois Lane #1–8, 264 pages, January 2012, 1-4012-3315-5.
- Superman in the Fifties – includes Superman's Girl Friend, Lois Lane #8, 192 pages, October 2002, 1563898268.
- Showcase Presents: Supergirl – includes Superman's Girl Friend, Lois Lane #14, 528 pages, November 2007, 1-4012-1717-6.
- DC's Greatest Imaginary Stories, Vol. 1 includes Superman's Girl Friend, Lois Lane #19 and 51, 192 pages, September 2005, 978-1401205348
- Superman in the Sixties – includes Superman's Girl Friend, Lois Lane #20 and 42, 240 pages, October 1999, 1563895226.
- Superman: The Bottle City of Kandor includes Superman's Girl Friend, Lois Lane #21, 76, 78; 200 pages, October 2007, 978-1401214654
- Catwoman: Nine Lives of a Feline Fatale – includes Superman's Girl Friend, Lois Lane #70–71, 208 pages, July 2004, 1401202136.
- Batman Arkham: Catwoman includes Superman's Girl Friend, Lois Lane #70-71, 248 pages, September 2021, 978-1401299804
- DC's Greatest Imaginary Stories, Vol. 2 includes Superman's Girl Friend, Lois Lane #89, 144 pages, June 2010, 978-1401227258
- Diana Prince: Wonder Woman Vol. 2 – includes Superman's Girl Friend, Lois Lane #93, 176 pages, August 2008, 1401218253.
- Superman in the Seventies – includes Superman's Girl Friend, Lois Lane #106, 224 pages, November 2000, 1563896389.
- Lois Lane: A Celebration of 75 Years – special anniversary anthology, celebrating Lois Lane' seventy-five years in comics. Includes Superman's Girlfriend, Lois Lane #1, 5, 16, 23, 42, 106; 384 pages, November 2013, 1401247032.

== See also ==
- Superman's Pal Jimmy Olsen
- The Superman Family
