= Superboy (comic book) =

Comic book published by DC Comics

- Cover of Superboy #1 (March–April 1949), art by Wayne Boring and Stan Kaye.

Publication information
- Schedule: List: (vol. 1) Bi-monthly (#1–28, #193–206) 8 times a year (#29–125, #207–219) 9 times a year (#126–176) Monthly (#177–192, #220–230) (The New Adventures of ..., vol. 3, and vol. 5) Monthly (vol. 2) Monthly (#1–19) Bi-monthly (#20–22) (vol. 4) Monthly (#1–9) Semi-monthly (#10–11)
- Format: Ongoing series
- Genre: Superhero
- Publication date: List: (vol. 1) March–April 1949 – August 1977 (The New Adventures of ...) January 1980 – June 1984 (vol. 2) February 1990 – February 1992 (vol. 3) February 1994 – July 2002 (vol. 4) January 2011 – Late October 2011 (vol. 5) November 2011 – October 2014
- No. of issues: List: (vol. 1): 230 and 1 Annual (The New Adventures of ...): 54 (vol. 2): 22 (vol. 3): 102 (#1–100 plus issues numbered 0 and 1,000,000) and 4 Annuals (vol. 4): 11 (vol. 5): 35 (#1–34 plus issue numbered 0), a Superboy: Futures End one-shot, and 1 Annual
- Main character: List: (vol. 1) and (The New Adventures of ...) Clark Kent / Kal-El (vol. 2) Clark Kent based on Superboy television series (vol. 3–5) Kon-El / Conner Kent

Creative team
- Written by: List: (vol. 1) Otto Binder E. Nelson Bridwell Cary Bates Jerry Coleman Paul Levitz (The New Adventures of ...) Cary Bates (vol. 3) Karl Kesel Ron Marz Barbara Kesel Jay Faerber Joe Kelly Eddie Berganza Jimmy Palmiotti Dan Didio (vol. 4) Jeff Lemire (vol. 5) Tom DeFalco Scott Lobdell
- Penciller: List: (vol. 1) John Sikela George Papp Al Plastino Bob Brown Dave Cockrum Mike Grell James Sherman Joe Staton (The New Adventures of ...) Kurt Schaffenberger Keith Giffen (vol. 3) Tom Grummett Paul Ryan Ramon Bernado Sal Buscema Georges Jeanty Ben Herrera Sunny Lee Pascal Ferry John McCrea (vol. 4) Pier Gallo (vol. 5) R.B. Silva
- Inker: List: (vol. 1) Jack Abel Murphy Anderson Bob Wiacek Josef Rubinstein (vol. 3) Doug Hazlewood Vincent Giarrano Stan Woch José Marzan Jr. Ray Kryssing John Stanici Keith Champagne James Hodgkins (vol. 5) Rob Lean

Superboy is the name of several American comic book series published by DC Comics, featuring characters of the same name. The first three Superboy titles feature the original Superboy, who is a younger version of Superman. Later series feature the second Superboy, Conner Kent, who is a partial clone of Superman.

== Publication history ==
=== Volume 1 (1949–1977) ===
The first series featured the original Superboy, a teenage incarnation of the Man of Steel. It began publication in 1949, four years after the character's debut in More Fun Comics #101 (January 1945). The majority of the stories were set in the rural town of Smallville during the character's youth, including tales of his toddlerhood. Comics historian Les Daniels noted that early Superboy stories seemed to celebrate the virtues of life in America's small towns, and that covers in the book made Smallville look like a "dreamworld" where few problems existed. The supporting cast included Superboy's adoptive parents Jonathan and Martha Kent, his over-inquisitive classmate and neighbor Lana Lang, best friend Pete Ross who was secretly aware of Superboy's true identity as Clark Kent, Smallville Police Chief Parker, and the super-powered canine Krypto. With the exception of a teenage Lex Luthor, who was a frequent foe of the Boy of Steel, almost none of the featured villains appeared more than once. Fuzzy the Krypto Mouse, a character who appeared in a single story in Superboy #65 (June 1958), inspired a similar character created by writer Art Baltazar in 2012. Bizarro debuted in Superboy #68 (Oct. 1958). For much of this period, DC also published Superboy tales in Adventure Comics, which began featuring the Boy of Steel regularly in issue #103 (April 1946). In 1962, Superboy was the second best selling comic book in the United States, surpassed only by Superman in sales.

The Legion of Super-Heroes starred in their own backup feature starting with #172 (March 1971). Nick Cardy was the cover artist for Superboy for issues #182–198 and 200–206. Dave Cockrum began drawing the Legion feature with issue #184 (April 1972), again increasing the team's popularity. Wildfire made his first appearance as ERG-1 in the Legion back-up feature in issue #195. With issue #197 (September 1973), the Legion became permanent co-stars, and the cover logo became "Superboy starring the Legion of Super-Heroes" while the title of the book itself remained Superboy. Crafted by Cary Bates and Cockrum, the feature proved popular and saw such events as the wedding of Bouncing Boy and Duo Damsel in issue #200 (Feb. 1974). Issues #202 (June 1974) and #205 (Dec. 1974) of the series were in the 100 Page Super Spectacular format. Cockrum was replaced on art by Mike Grell as of issue #203 (August 1974) which featured the death of Invisible Kid. With issue #222 (Dec. 1976), the cover logo became "Superboy and the Legion of Super-Heroes" and the book's title itself followed with issue #231 (Sept. 1977). The character Dawnstar was introduced in issue #226 (April 1977). A backup story in issue #236 served as a lead-in to All-New Collectors' Edition #C-55 which featured the wedding of longtime Legion members Saturn Girl and Lightning Lad. Writer Paul Levitz and artists James Sherman and Joe Staton crafted "Earthwar" a five-issue storyline in Superboy and the Legion of Super-Heroes #241–245 (July–Nov. 1978). A story originally scheduled to appear in DC Special Series was split apart and published in Superboy and the Legion of Super-Heroes #250-251 due to the DC Implosion. Starting with issue #259 (Jan. 1980), the title was changed to Legion of Super-Heroes (vol. 2), and the Boy of Steel left both the team and the book. Though Superboy later rejoined, he made only occasional appearances in the series that once bore his name, and the series remained a Legion book until its last issue, Tales of the Legion of Super-Heroes #354 (Dec. 1987).

=== The New Adventures of Superboy (1980–1984) ===
The second series was actually titled The New Adventures of Superboy. It was launched to provide readers with monthly Smallville-based Superboy tales, which had largely disappeared after the Legion became co-stars of the original Superboy title, before re-emerging for brief stints in Adventure Comics and The Superman Family between 1977–1979. The series continued monthly publication for a total of 54 issues, with virtually all issues being pencilled by longtime Lois Lane artist Kurt Schaffenberger. Issue #50 (Feb. 1984) featured a Legion of Super-Heroes guest appearance with Keith Giffen splitting the story's art duties with Schaffenberger.

Superboy Spectacular #1 (March 1980) was DC's first direct sales-only title.

Briefly, the series also included a "Dial H for Hero" back-up feature which told the story of Chris King and Vicki Grant, two teenagers who could change into a variety of superheroes based on reader submissions. The feature was originally presented in Adventure Comics, but moved to Superboy shortly after Adventure Comics ended its run as a monthly comic.

=== Volume 2 (1989–1991) ===
The third series (vol. 2) was different from other Superman or Superboy titles in that it was set in the continuity of the Superboy television series, as opposed to the regular DC Universe (as the original Superboy was erased from mainstream DC continuity after the 1985 miniseries Crisis on Infinite Earths, with Superman beginning his superhero career as an adult). Its intent was to explore some of the unseen tales and events that the TV series could not. The series originally carried the cover title Superboy: The Comic Book with issue #1 (Feb. 1990) having a photo cover with the show's stars Gerard Christopher and Stacy Haiduk, although the title in the indicia was simply Superboy. After issue #11, the series changed its cover title to The Adventures of Superboy, a change reflected in the indicia beginning with issue #18. The series was published monthly until it went bi-monthly for its final three issues, and remained in publication for 22 issues to the end of 1991 (cover dated Feb. 1992), and a concluding one-issue Special in 1992.

=== Volume 3 (1994–2002) ===
A new Superboy was introduced in The Adventures of Superman #500 (June 1993) in the prelude to the third story arc "Reign of the Supermen" in the storyline "The Death of Superman". Originally established as a human clone genetically altered to imitate Superman's powers created by Project Cadmus, the new Superboy became the focus of The Adventures of Superman, written by Karl Kesel and pencilled by Tom Grummett. The character was then given his own title wherein he became the resident superhero of Hawaii; Kesel and Grummett carried over as the series' first creative team, and also retained Superboy's supporting cast including love interest Tana Moon, unscrupulous agent Rex Leech and his daughter Roxy, and fellow Cadmus creation Dubbilex. Knockout first appeared in issue #1 (Feb. 1994) and became a recurring antagonist for Superboy. During this time, Superboy also became an honorary member of the Legion of Super-Heroes during one of the team's journeys to the present day.

Kesel and Grummett left the series after issue #30. Subsequently, the series was mainly written by Ron Marz and Barbara Kesel; pencillers included Ramon Bernado, Sal Buscema, and Georges Jeanty. During this period, Superboy also appeared in the companion title Superboy and the Ravers, which ran for 19 issues.

Kesel and Grummett returned to the series with issue #50. The creative team's second run saw major status quo shifts, including Superboy moving away from Hawaii and becoming employed by Project Cadmus, and the introduction of new regular supporting characters including Dr Serling Roquette, Mickey Cannon, and Guardian. Superboy was also given the Kryptonian name Kon-El. Kesel and Grummett's second run concluded with issue #79.

A new regular creative team of writer Joe Kelly and penciller Pasqual Ferry began on the series with issue #83; Eddie Berganza began as co-writer with issue #87. The creative team changed again in issue #94, with the new writing team of Jimmy Palmiotti and Dan DiDio and penciller John McCrea; this run saw Kon-El move to an apartment building in the Suicide Slum section of Metropolis, with an entirely new supporting cast and set of street-level villains. The series was cancelled at issue #100 (with Kesel and Grummett returning for the prologue section of the finale; cover dated July 2002), having run for 102 issues altogether, including #0 and #1,000,000.

=== Volume 4 (2010–2011) ===
A new Superboy series starring Kon-El debuted with a January 2011 cover date, written by Jeff Lemire and drawn by Pier Gallo. In the intervening time between series, Kon-El had been retconned as a hybrid clone created from the DNA of Superman and Lex Luthor; Clark Kent's history as the original Superboy had also been restored to the main DC continuity. Kon-El, assuming the human identity of Conner Kent, lives with Martha Kent and Krypto in Smallville. Superboy. Superboy (vol. 4) ended as a result of DC Comics relaunching their entire line of comics in September 2011.

=== Volume 5 (2011–2014) ===
As part of The New 52 relaunch in September 2011, the Superboy series began with a new first issue. This new series was written by Scott Lobdell and drawn by R. B. Silva and Rob Lean. The series introduced a new version of Kon-El who was created by the secret organisation N.O.W.H.E.R.E. as a weapon. Tom DeFalco began scripting the series over Lobdell's plots with issue #6 (April 2012) and became the full writer with issue #12 (October 2012). Kon-El's genetic donor in the new continuity was originally left ambiguous and hinted to be the same as before the reboot, but was eventually revealed to be Jon Lane Kent, the villainous future son of Superman and Lois Lane.

Justin Jordan became the new series writer with issue #20. Kon-El was seemingly killed in the crossover story "Krypton Returns"; beginning with issue #26 under new writer Marv Wolfman, Jon Lane Kent became the new series protagonist. Aaron Kuder took over as writer with issue #30. The series was cancelled with issue #34 (October 2014), with Kon-El returning in the finale.

=== Collected editions ===
- Legion of Super-Heroes Archives
  - Volume 1 includes Superboy #86, #89, and #98, 255 pages, 1991, ISBN 978-1-56389-020-8
  - Volume 3 includes Superboy #117, 224 pages, 1993, ISBN 978-1-56389-102-1
  - Volume 4 includes Superboy #124-125, 224 pages, 1994, ISBN 978-1-56389-123-6
  - Volume 8 includes Superboy #147, 240 pages, February 1999, ISBN 978-1-56389-430-5
  - Volume 10 collects Superboy #172-173, #183-184, #188, #190-191, #193, #195, #197-202, 232 pages, October 2000, ISBN 978-1-56389-628-6
  - Volume 11 collects Superboy #203-212, 224 pages, August 2001, ISBN 978-1-56389-730-6
  - Volume 12 collects Superboy #212-223, 240 pages, May 2003, ISBN 978-1-56389-961-4
  - Volume 13 collects Superboy #224-233, 240 pages, May 2012, ISBN 978-1-4012-3439-3
- Showcase Presents: The Legion of Super-Heroes
  - Volume 1 includes Superboy #86, 89, 98, and 117, 560 pages, April 2007, ISBN 1-4012-1382-0
  - Volume 2 includes Superboy #117 and 125, 528 pages, April 2008, ISBN 978-1-4012-1724-2
  - Volume 4 includes Superboy #172-173, 176, 183-184, 188, 190-191, 512 pages, October 2010, ISBN 1-4012-2941-7
- Superboy: The Greatest Team-Ups Ever Told includes Superboy #55, 63, 80, 121, 171, 182 and The New Adventures of Superboy #13, 168 pages, January 2010, ISBN 1-4012-2652-3
- The New 52
  - Superboy Volume 1: Incubation collects Superboy vol. 5 #1-7, 160 pages, August 2012, ISBN 1-4012-3485-2
  - The Culling: Rise of the Ravagers collects Superboy vol. 5 #8-9; Legion Lost vol. 2 #8-9; Teen Titans vol. 4 #8-9, and Teen Titans Annual #1, 176 pages, January 2013, ISBN 1-4012-3799-1
  - Superboy Volume 2: Extraction collects Superboy vol. 5 #0, #8-12; Teen Titans vol. 4 #10, 160 pages, Mayz 2013, ISBN 978-1-4012-4049-3
  - Superboy Volume 3: Lost collects Superboy vol. 5 #13-19; Superboy Annual vol. 5 #1, 200 pages, December 2013
  - Superboy Volume 4: Blood and Steel collects Superboy vol. 5 #20-27, 160 pages, July 2014
  - Superboy Volume 5: Paradox collects Superboy vol. 5 #0, #28-34; Superboy: Future's End #1, 232 pages, January 2015

== See also ==
- Adventure Comics
- Superboy and the Ravers
- Smallville#Comic books - tie-in to the Smallville television series
