= Ray Osrin =

American cartoonist

- Born: Raymond Harold Osrin; October 5, 1928 Brooklyn, New York
- Died: April 3, 2001 (aged 72) Delray Beach, Florida
- Areas: Penciller, Inker
- Pseudonym: Drake Waller
- Awards: National Headliners Club's award for editorial cartooning, 1971

Raymond Harold Osrin (October 5, 1928 – April 3, 2001) was an American comic book artist and cartoonist. He was most notable for his work in the Golden Age of Comic Books. Later, he took a position as the editorial cartoonist for the Cleveland Plain Dealer, where his political cartoons appeared daily for more than 30 years.

== Biography ==
Osrin was born in Brooklyn, New York and studied at the School of Industrial Art and the Art Students League. He was a staff inker at Jerry Iger's comics shop from 1945 to 1949. In the 1940s, his work appeared at Fiction House and Fox.

In 1950 Osrin worked as an inker on It Rhymes with Lust, a newsstand publication that was the first graphic novel. Called a "picture novel" on the cover and published by the comic book and magazine company St. John Publications, it was written by Arnold Drake and Leslie Waller (together using the pseudonym Drake Waller), with black-and-white art by Matt Baker.

In the mid-1950s, he drew for Archie Comics (Pat the Brat), Charlton Comics (Blue Beetle, Crime and Justice, romance and suspense stories) and Dell/Gold Key (Snuffy Smith and Barney Google, Supercar). In the 1960s he was also a ghost artist on the Morty Meekle daily. In 1957 Osrin moved from New York City to Pittsburgh, where he was involved in television animation and industrial film making. He was a staff cartoonist of the Pittsburgh Press from 1958 to 1963.

In 1963, he "blindly applied for a job in the art department" of The Plain Dealer and was hired to replace editorial cartoonist Ed Kuekes. Osrin moved to Cleveland to work as a cartoonist and "wait for his predecessor to retire." He became the editorial cartoonist of The Plain Dealer in 1966, and remained there until retiring on April 2, 1993.

Osrin won the National Headliners Club's award for editorial cartooning in 1971. In a 1972 interview, Osrin said "I'm influenced by Oliphant and Mauldin and Herblock, (and) a fellow named Wright on a Miami newspaper." Other influences include Paul Conrad, Milt Caniff, Frank Robbins, and Matt Baker.

Upon retirement, he moved to Boca Raton, Florida. He donated collections of his cartoons to Cleveland State University and the Billy Ireland Cartoon Library & Museum at Ohio State University in the hopes that his work would "mean something later on and somebody can enjoy it." He died from complications due to heart disease and diabetes on April 3, 2001, in Delray Beach, Florida.
