= List of St. John Publications =

St. John Publications was an American publishing company; the following is a list of their comic book titles.

== Cartoon-character series ==
- Adventures of Mighty Mouse #2-18 (Jan. 1952–May 1955); continues from Paul Terry's Mighty Mouse Adventures; see Paul Terry's Adventures of Mighty Mouse
- Casper the Friendly Ghost #1–5 (September 1949–September 1951)
- Dinky Duck #1–15 (November 1951-October 1955); continued by Pines
- Gandy Goose #1-4 (March 1953-November 1953); continued by Pines
- Heckle and Jeckle #3–24 (October 1951–October 1955); continues from Blue Ribbon Comics #1 & 3; continued by Pines
- Little Audrey #1-24 (1948-1951)
- Little Eva #1–31 (May 1952–November 1956)
- Little Roquefort Comics #1–9 (June 1952–October 1953); continued by Pines
- Mighty Mouse / Paul Terry's Mighty Mouse Comics #5–67 (August 1947–February 1956); continued by Pines
- Paul Terry's Adventures of Mighty Mouse #126–128 (August 1955–November 1955); continues from Paul Terry's Comics; continued by Pines
- Paul Terry's Mighty Mouse Adventures #1 (Nov. 1951); continued as Adventures of Mighty Mouse
- Paul Terry's Comics #87–#125 (May 1951–May 1955); continues from Paul Terry's TerryToon Comics; continues as Paul Terry's Adventures of Mighty Mouse
- Paul Terry's TerryToon Comics #84–86 (January 1951–May 1951); continues from Terry-Toons Comics; continues as Paul Terry's Comics
- Terry Bears Comics #1-3 (June 1952–March 1953)
- Terry-Toons Comics (1952 series) #1-9 (June 1952-November 1953)
- Terry-Toons Comics #60-83 (September 1947-November 1950); continues from Timely Comics' run; continues as Paul Terry's TerryToon Comics
- Three Dimension Comics, featuring Mighty Mouse #1-3 (Sept. 1953-Dec. 1953)

== Comic-strip reprint series ==
- Abbie an' Slats #2–3 (March 1948–June 1948)
- Fritzi Ritz #37-55 (April 1955–July 1957); series picked up from United Feature; continued at Dell Comics
- Moon Mullins #7–8 (February 1949–April 1949); series picked up from American Comics Group)
- Mopsy #1–19 (February 1948–September 1953)
- Nancy and Sluggo #121-145 (1955–1957); series picked up from United Feature; continued at Dell
- Tip Top Comics # 189-210 (1955–1957); series picked up from United Feature; continued at Dell
- A Treasury of Comics #1–5 (1947–1948)
- Vic Flint #1–2 (August 1948–October 1948); continued at New Century Press

== Movie-comedian series ==
- Abbott and Costello Comics #1-40 (Feb. 1948 - Sept. 1956)
- Laurel and Hardy Comics #1 (March 1949 - ?)
- Three Stooges #1-7 (Sept. 1953 - Oct. 1954); on St. John's Jubilee Publications imprint

== Original series ==
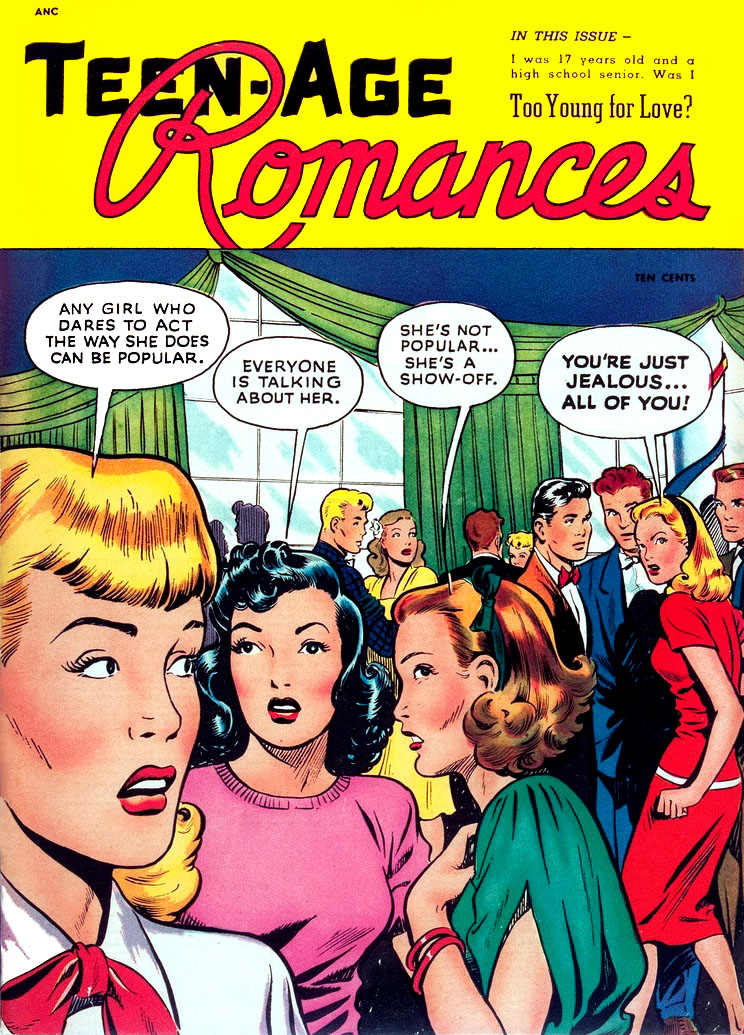
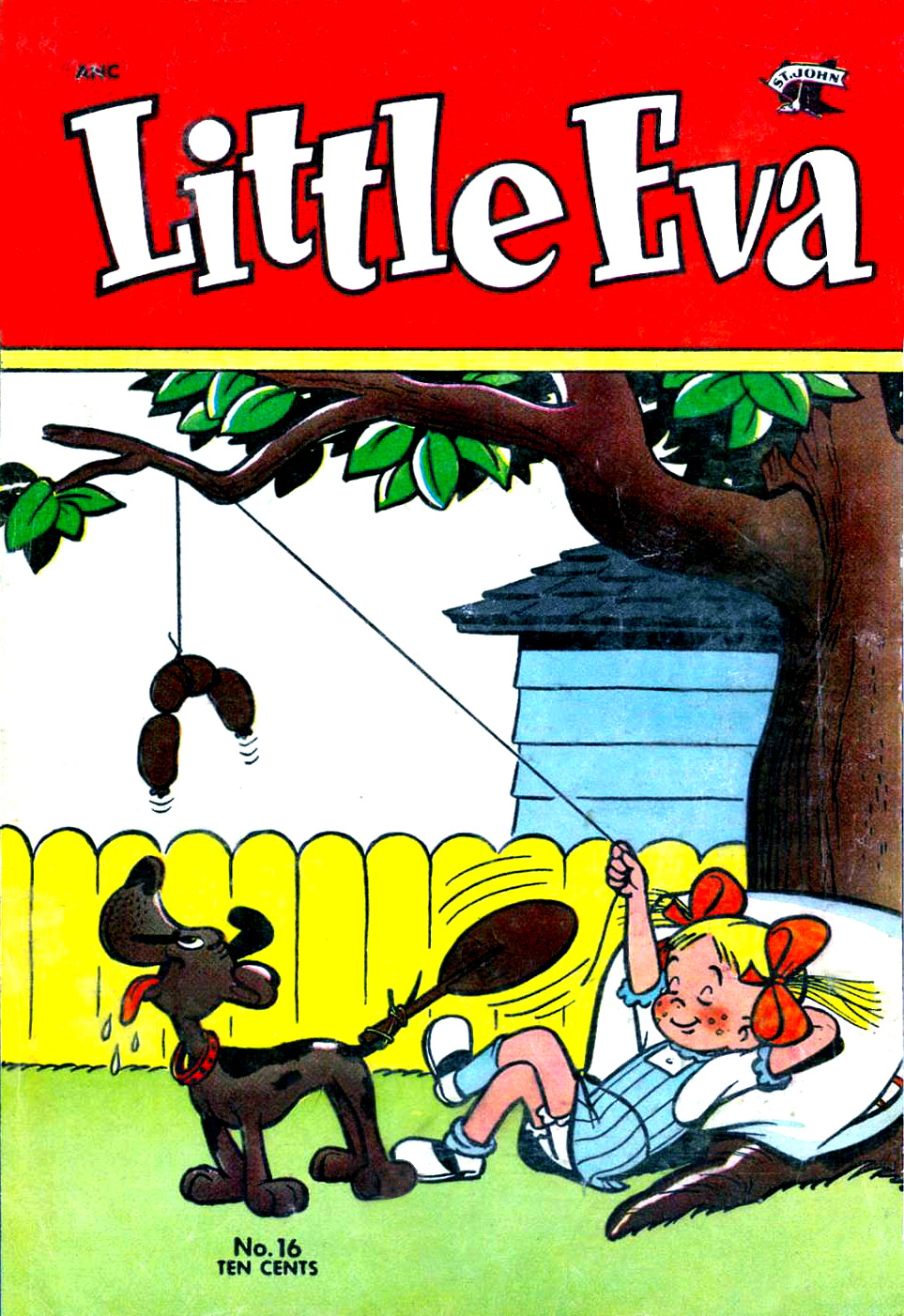
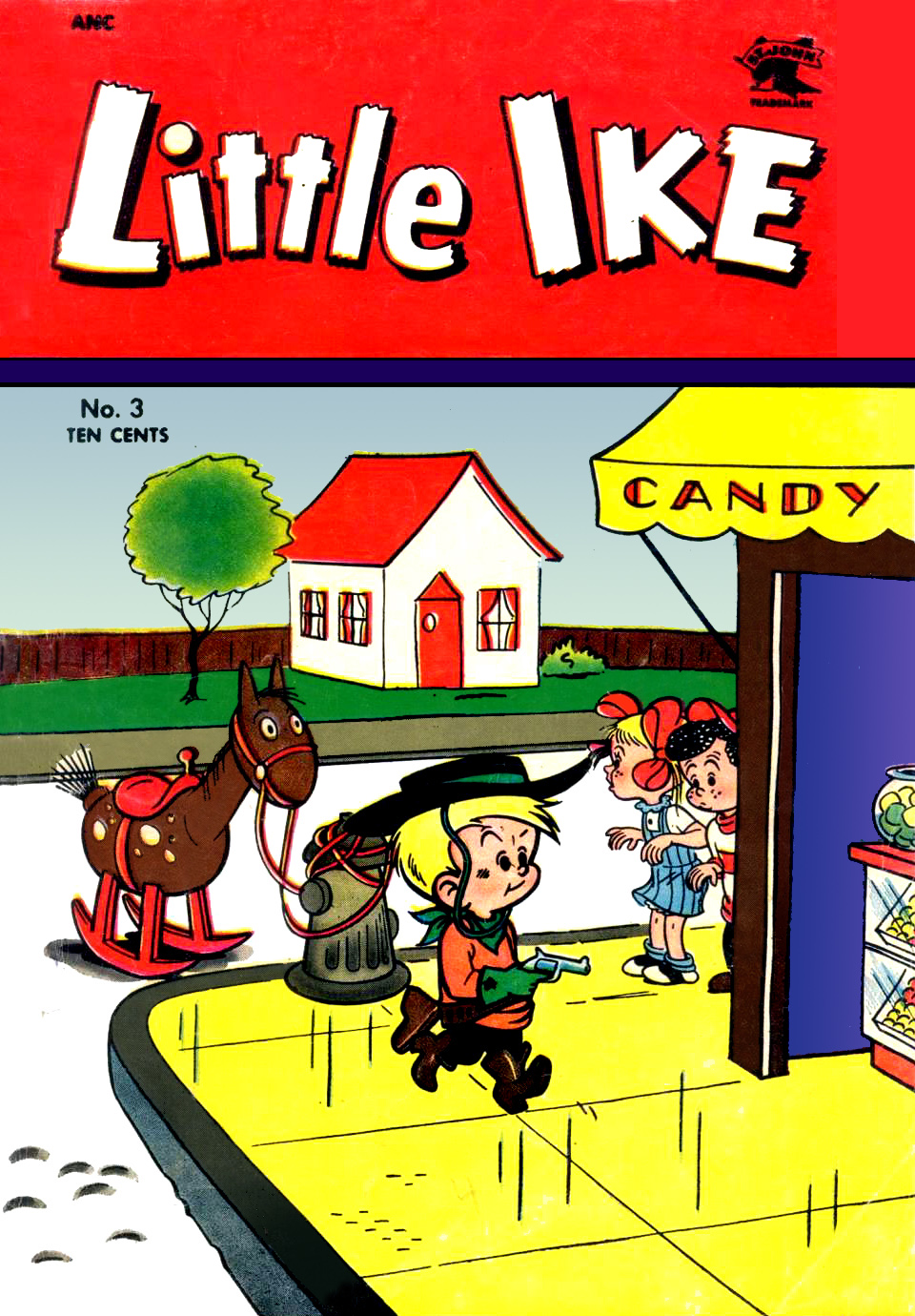
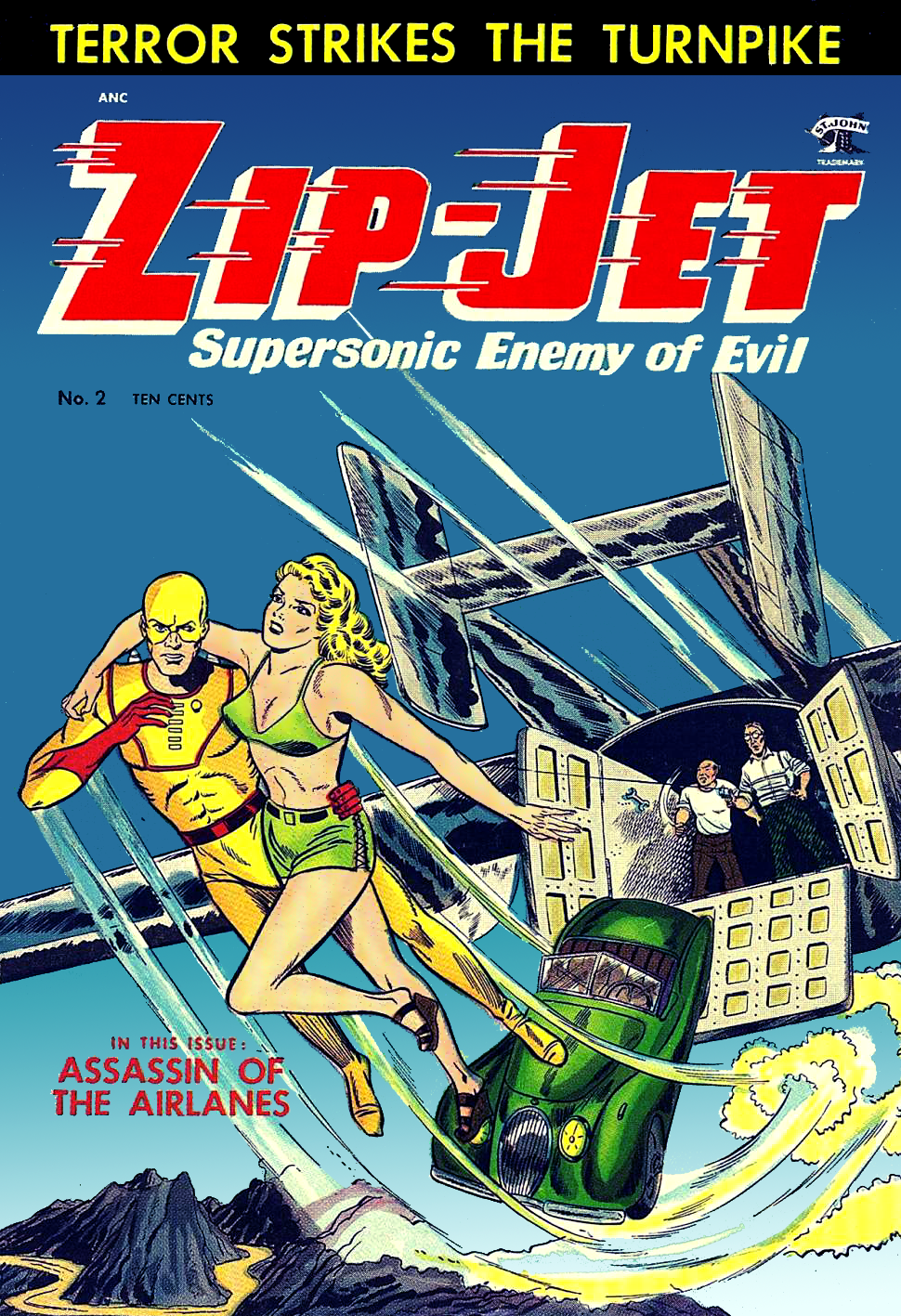
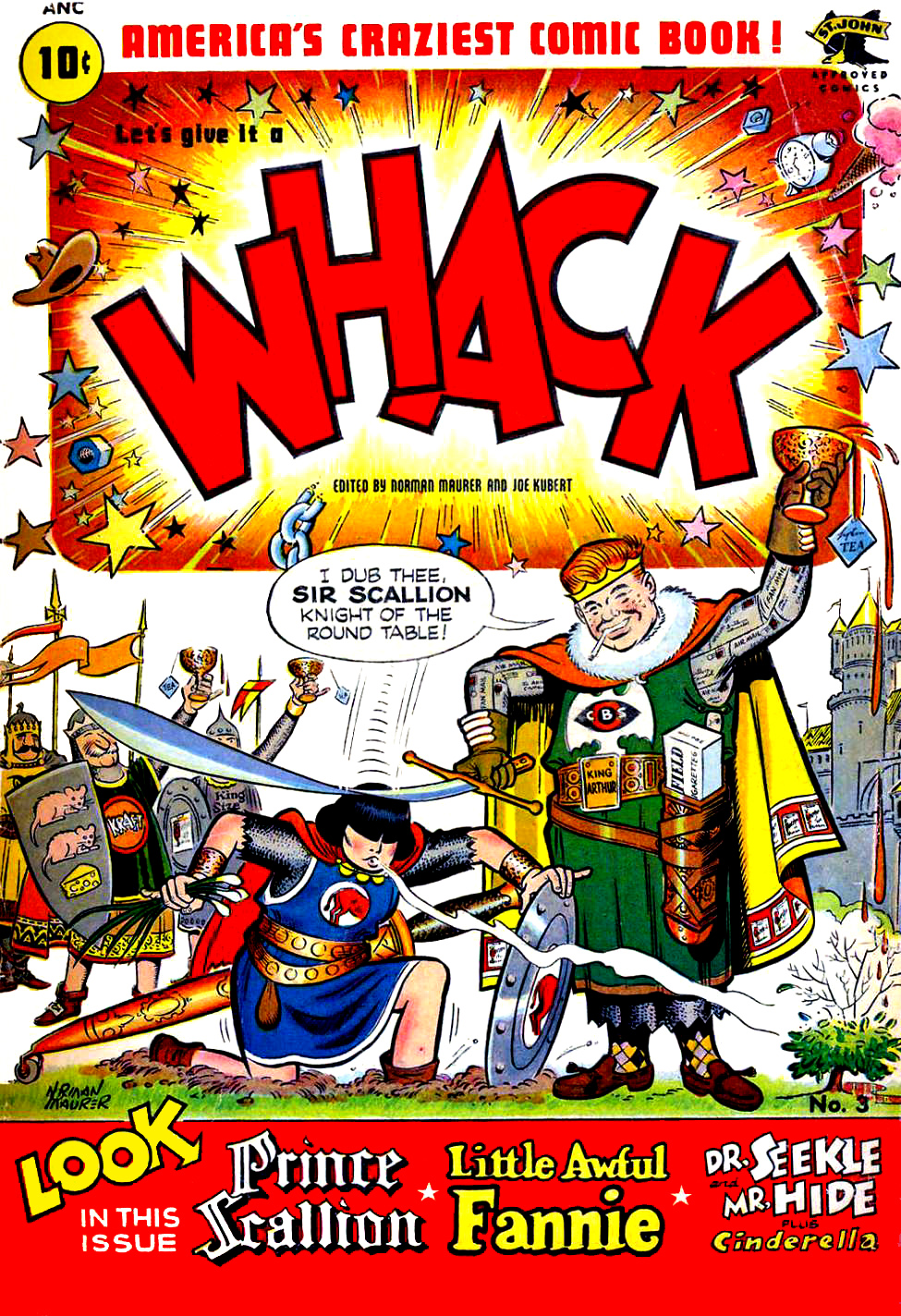
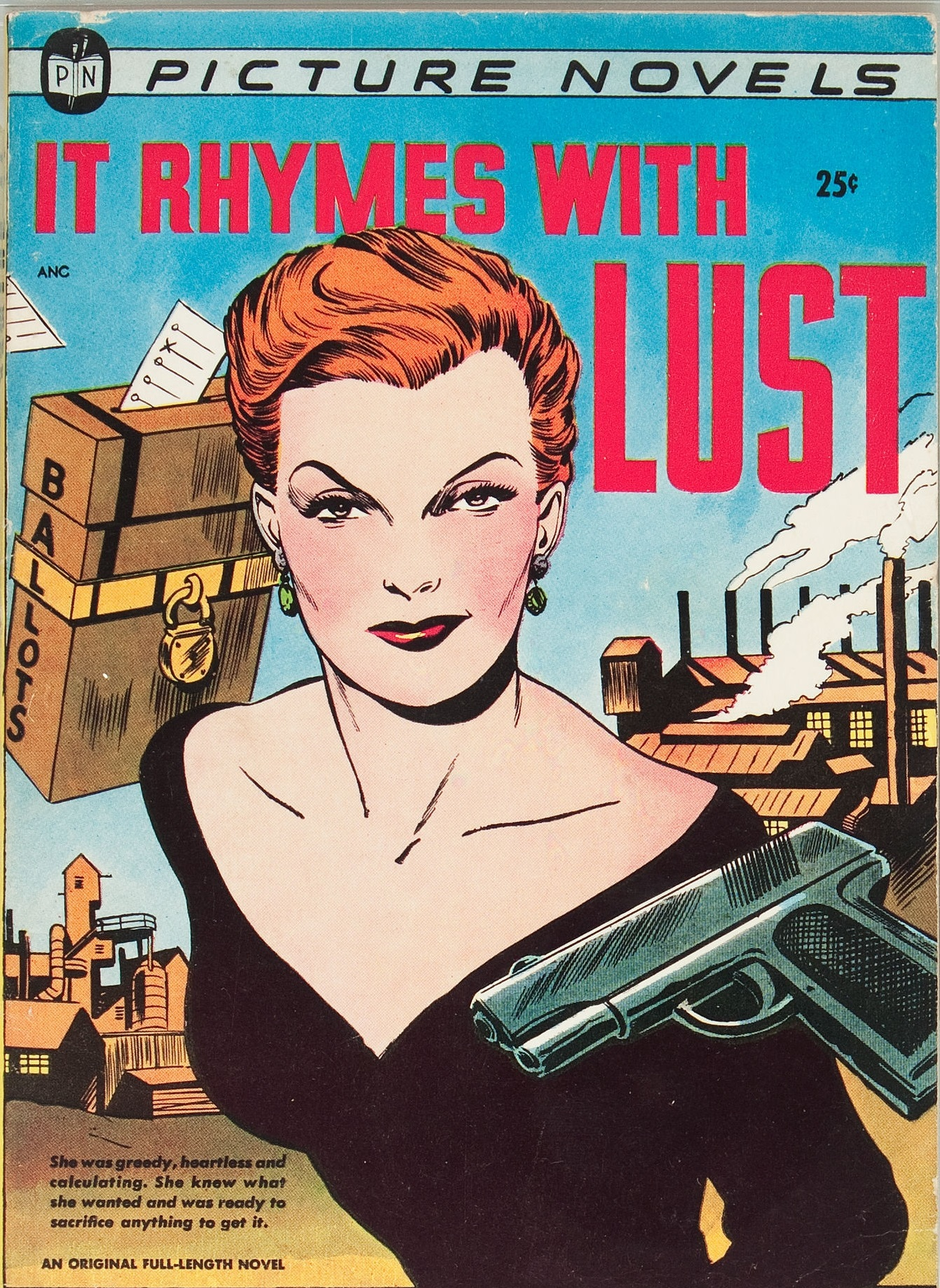
Original titles published by St. John.
- 1,000,000 Years Ago (a.k.a. One Million Years Ago) #1, featuring Tor; continued as:

- 3-D Comics #2

three eds.: standard & oversize, Oct. 1953; standard w/3-D cover, some different content, Nov. 1953; featuring Tor; continued as:

- Tor #3-5

- Anchors Andrews #1 (Jan. 1953); continued as:

- Anchors the Salt Water Daffy #2-4 (March–July 1953)

- Approved Comics #1-12 (1953-1954)

Showcase series featuring generally one issue each of series including Crime on the Run, Daring Adventures, Fightin' Marines, Flyboy, The Hawk, Invisible Boy, Kid Cowboy, Northwest Mounties, and Western Bandit Trail. Approved Comics also name of a St. John imprint.

- Atom-Age Combat #1-5 (June 1952 - April 1953)
- Atom-Age Combat Vol. 2, #1 (Feb. 1958)
- Authentic Police Cases #1-38 (Feb. 1948 - March 1955; sporadically included Vic Flint comic-strip reprints)
- Basil the Royal Cat #1-4 (Jan.-Sept. 1953)
- Blue Ribbon Comics #1-3, 6 (Feb.-Aug. 1949); on St. John's Blue Ribbon imprint; continued as:

- Teen-Age Diary Secrets #4-9 (Sept. 1949 - August 1950); continued as:
- Diary Secrets #10-30 (Feb. 1952 - Sept. 1955)

- Canteen Kate #1-3 (June-Nov. 1952)
- The Case of the Winking Buddha (1950; "Picture Novel")
- Cinderella Love #12-15 (Oct. 1953 - Aug. 1954, continued from Ziff-Davis run) See also Romantic Love
- Crime Reporter #1-3 (August-Oct. 1948)
- Daring Adventures #7-18
- Do You Believe in Nightmares #1-2 (Nov. 1957–Jan. 1958)
- Double Trouble #1-2 (Nov. 1957 - Feb. 1958)
- Fugitives from Justice #1-5 (Feb.-Oct. 1952; last four issues included Vic Flint comic-strip reprints)
- The Hawk #4-12 (Oct. 1953 - May 1955; continued from Ziff-Davis run; reportedly no #7 published, #5–6 published as Approved Comics #1 & 7
- Hollywood Confessions #1-2 (Oct. 1949—Dec. 1949); continued as:

- Hollywood Pictorial #3 (Jan. 1950); continued as:
- Movie magazine Hollywood Pictorial Western #4–5 (March 1950–September 1950)

- The House of Terror #1 (Oct. 1953; 3-D comic)
- It Rhymes with Lust (1950; "Picture Novel")
- Kid Cowboy #11 & 13–14 (Oct. 1953–June 1955); continued from Ziff-Davis run; reportedly no #12 published)
- Little Eva #1-31 (May 1952 - Nov. 1956)
- Little Eva 3-D #1-2 (Oct.-Nov. 1953)
- Meet Miss Pepper #5-6 (April–June 1954; continues from Lucy, The Real Gone Gal; further info n.a.)
- Nightmare #3 (October 1953); continued from Ziff-Davis run (see Weird Horrors continuation)
- Northwest Mounties #1-4 (Oct. 1948 - July 1949); on St. John's Jubilee Publications imprint
- Romantic Marriage #18-24 (continued from Ziff-Davis run); continues as:

- Cinderella Love #25-29 (see also Cinderella Love above)

- Son of Sinbad #1 (Feb. 1950)
- Secret Missions #1 (Feb. 1950 one-shot)
- Strange Terrors #1-7 (June 1952 - March 1953)
- Teen-Age Romances #1-45 (Jan. 1949 - Dec. 1955); at least two issues on St. John's Approved Comics imprint
- The Texan #1-15 (Aug. 1948 - Oct. 1951); continues as:

- The Fightin' Texan #16–17 (Sep. 1952–December 1952)
- Fightin' Marines #15 (Aug. 1951), #2-12 (Oct. 1951 - March 1953); continues as Charlton Comics title

- Wartime Romances #1-18 (July 1951 - Nov. 1953)
- Weird Horrors #1-9 (June 1952 - Oct. 1953); continues as:

- Nightmare #10-13 (Dec. 1953 - Aug. 1954); continues as:
- Amazing Ghost Stories #14-16 (Oct. 1954 - Feb. 1955)

- Western Bandit Trails #1-3 (January–July 1949); on St. John's Jubilee Publications imprint
- Whack #1-3 (October 1953–May 1954; #1 in 3-D)
- Wild Boy of the Congo #9-15 (Oct. 1953 - June 1955; continues from Ziff-Davis run; reportedly no #10 published)
- World’s Greatest Stories #1-2 (January 1948–May 1949); on St. John's Jubilee Publications imprint
- Zip-Jet #1-2 (Feb.-May 1953)

== Sources ==
- St. John (publisher) at the Grand Comics Database.
- "St. John Romance Comics Checklist" (PDF). Fantagraphics Books. 2007. Archived (PDF) from the original on March 18, 2019.
