= Teen-Age Romances =

Young Romance
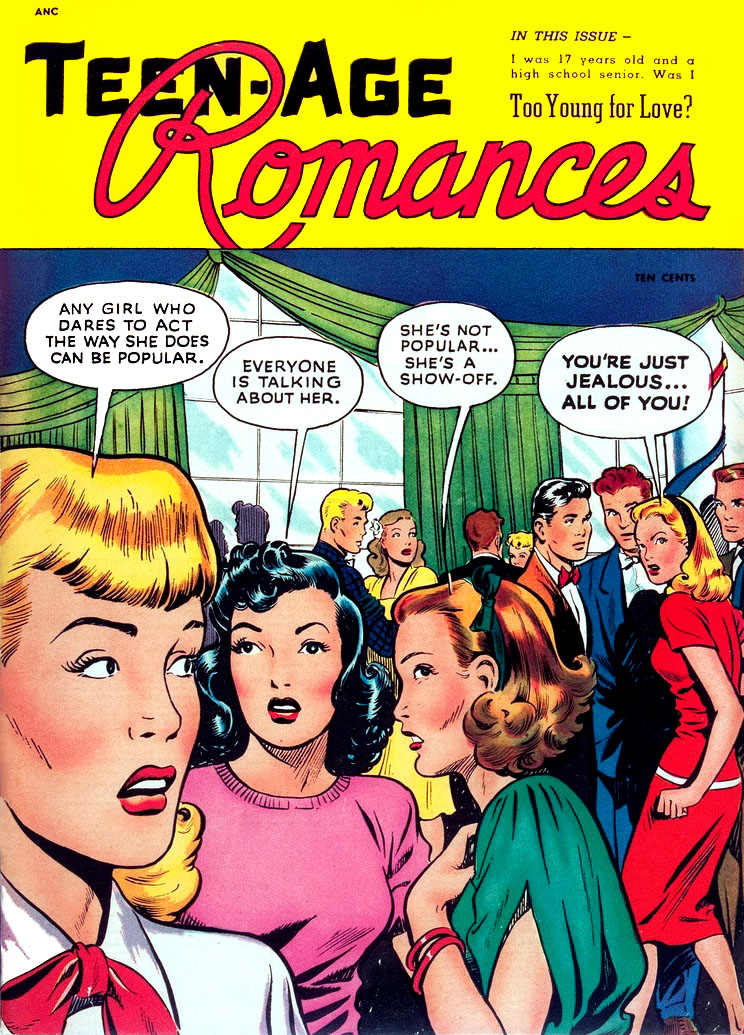
- Teen-Age Romances #1 (Jan. 1949); Cover art by penciler Matt Baker

Publication information
- Publisher: St. John Publications
- Schedule: Quarterly
- Publication date: 1949 - 1955
- No. of issues: 45 (#1-#45)

Creative team
- Written by: various, including Dana Dutch
- Penciller(s): various, including Matt Baker, Lily Renée

Teen-Age Romances was an American romance comic series produced by St. John Publications. Each issue was a series of one-shot stories involving a wide cast of characters. The first three issues began with a standard format of five stories each, and then it branched out to various larger numbers.

== Publication history ==
Teen-Age Romances, one of a late-1940s spate of romance comics, ran 45 issues, cover-dated January 1949 to December 1955. Released by St. John Publications, with at least two issues published under that publisher's Approved Comics imprint, it included among its artists Lily Renée and Matt Baker. Many stories were written by Dana Dutch.

Issues #4-8 (Aug. 1949 - Feb. 1950) carried photographic covers, and issues #26-30 (Nov. 1952 - March 1953) used painted covers, rather than standard penciled-and-inked drawn covers.

== Stories ==
The titles of the various stories include:

=== 1949 ===
1. January (Too Young for Love?)
  1. They Called Me a Wayward Girl
  2. Too Many Dates Were My Downfall
  3. Was I Too Young for Love?
  4. I Played Hide and Seek with Love
  5. I Spelled Ki$$e$ the Wrong Way
2. April (no title)
  1. I Dared to Kiss and Tell
  2. We Couldn't Be Kept Apart
  3. They Made Me a Cinderella
  4. How Could I Fight Temptation?
  5. I Took the Wrong Road to Romance
3. July (I Was Afraid to Fall in Love)
  1. I Didn't Want a Stepfather
  2. I Was Afraid to Fall in Love
  3. Did I Give My Love Too Freely?
  4. Stand-In for Scandal
  5. Spitework Was My Folly
4. August (I couldn't give up my SECRET LOVE)
  1. Moonlight Escapade
  2. Never Gamble on a Lie
  3. You're What the Boys Like
  4. Does Necking Increase a Girl's Popularity?
  5. Hollywood Pin-Ups - Peter Lawford
  6. They Called Me a Love Thief
  7. Pleasure Boat
  8. Mopsy ["Beside the regular sales tax, there's an amusement tax on that model!"]
  9. Phony Love Affair
  10. I Couldn't Give Up My Secret Love
  11. I'll Not Date in August
  12. Short Cuts to Glamour
  13. Platter Chatter
  14. Step Out, Please!
  15. Movie Previews
5. September (I was a HOLLYWOOD CINDERELLA)
  1. Come-On Girl
  2. I Was a Hollywood Cinderella
  3. My One Little Mistake
  4. Love Is Born
  5. Rival in Love
  6. Platter Chatter
  7. Brushes to Beauty
6. October (I was Caught Stealing Kisses)
  1. Flame of Youth
  2. It Doesn't Pay to Steal Kisses
  3. Rx for a Broken Heart
  4. Was I a Fool to Go On Loving Him?
  5. I Lived a Lie
  6. Was I Really a Bad Girl?
7. November (I RAN AWAY FROM HOME)
  1. I Ran Away from Home
  2. Reputation at Stake
  3. Suspicion Nearly Killed My Love
  4. The Love Bargain I Couldn't Keep
