= St. John Publications =

Defunct American publishing company

- Founded: 1947
- Founder: Archer St. John
- Defunct: 1958 (comics), 1967 (magazines)
- Country of origin: United States
- Headquarters location: 545 Fifth Avenue, New York City
- Key people: Matt Baker
- Publication types: Comic books, magazines
- Fiction genres: Romance, humor, funny animal, war, crime, mystery
- Imprints: Comics: Approved Comics, Blue Ribbon, Jubilee Publications; Magazines: Flying Eagle Publications

St. John Publications was an American publisher of magazines and comic books. During the 1947-1958 existence of its comic-book division, St. John established several industry firsts. Founded by Archer St. John, the firm was located in Manhattan at 545 Fifth Avenue. After the St. John comic books came to an end in 1958, the company continued to publish its magazine line into the next decade. Flying Eagle Publications was a magazine affiliate of St. John Publications. Comic book imprints included Approved Comics, Blue Ribbon, and Jubilee Publications.

== History ==
Matt Baker (left) and Archer St. John at Grauman's Chinese Theatre, undated.

=== Archer St. John ===
The younger brother of World War II correspondent and author Robert William St. John (1902–2003), Archer St. John was born either c. 1901 or on October 15, 1904 in Chicago, Illinois. Their mother Amy, a nurse, and father John, a pharmacist, moved the family to suburban Oak Park in 1910. Following the father's death in 1917 and the mother's eventual remarriage, Archer attended the St. Albans Episcopal Academy boarding school in Sycamore, Illinois. Both brothers became journalists, with Archer founding the Berwyn [Illinois] Tribune in the mid-1920s.

He left that newspaper by 1930. By then, he had become advertising manager of the New York City-based model-train maker Lionel Trains Corporation. Among his duties, he edited the company's hobbyist magazine, Model Builder, debuting January 1937. It included true railroad stories in its editorial mix, eventually adding such illustrated featurettes as "Famous Railroad Sagas". By this time, he was married and living in Darien, Connecticut, with wife Gertrude (née Adams) and son Michael.

By the early 1940s, St. John was editor of the 17-issue magazine Flying Cadet (Jan. 1943 – Oct. 1944). Like Model Builder, it mixed editorial prose with comics-style instructional featurettes. That changed with its final issue, a standard comic book that included fictional adventure ("Buzz Benson" by Maurice Whitman and George Kapitan; Lt. Lela Lang, art by Kapitan, about a female bomber pilot) and humor ("Grease Pan Gus") features. The company — also called Flying Cadet — additionally published American Air Forces #1 (Oct. 1944), as well as some issues of Dynamic Comics and Punch Comics.

Either editing in his off hours while continuing to work at Lionel, or having left and returned to the company — a December 1944 letter that he signed places St. John in the Lionel advertising department at that time — St. John left the model-train maker in early 1945. After acquiring a reported $400,000 in start-up financing, he began publishing two comic books, Comics Revue and Pageant of Comics, both reprinting comic strips. They appeared under his own name as publisher in 1947. Shortly afterward, his comic book company took on the name St. John Publications. It had offices at 545 Fifth Avenue in Manhattan, New York City, and in 1950 took on additional space at 235-243 Pulaski Street in the neighboring borough of Brooklyn.

Artist Joe Kubert who worked for St. John described him as "one of the most aristocratic upper-crust types that you'd ever come across. But he was as much unlike that underneath that veneer as anybody I can think of. When you sat down to talk to him he was really a regular guy." Nadine King, office manager for the company, socialized with St. John often, described him as "exceptional bright" and said that "...he did make a lot of money and lost a lot of money."

Marion McDermott was an editor for St. John Publications. Fellow editor Nadine King said in an interview published in 2012 that St. John had an affair with McDermott. They traveled together to Bermuda in 1950 and 1951. Artist Lily Renée also recounted that St. John chased her once around a table in the office and a woman editor put a stop to it.

In the early 1950s St. John became friends with artist Matt Baker, who provided most of the comic book covers for the company. When asked about the nature of the relationship, Baker's brother Fred Robinson said in an interview published in 2012, "They had a very close relationship. I don't know exactly what it was." They traveled to Los Angeles together and were photographed in Grauman's Chinese Theatre in front of Jean Harlow's footprints.

According to the people that worked for him, including Renée, St. John was charming and pleasant to work for, but he struggled with alcoholism. Graphic designer Warren Kramer recounted that St. John would attend Alcoholics Anonymous meetings, and was sober "most of the time". He said that St. John was "almost exactly" like the Harry Myers' "Eccentric Millionaire" character in the film City Lights. That character is an alcoholic who suffers from state-dependent memory. However, Kramer added that although "Very peculiar", St. John was "...a very, very decent guy."

In 1952, Archer St. John's brother Robert saw Archer in person for the last time. Archer flew from New York to Geneva, and on Robert's description "looked dreadful: he was terribly disheveled. His face was badly cut up; his hand was cut; there was blood all over his shirt." St. John had been drinking heavily on the plane. He bought a Swiss watch intended, he said, for a woman with whom he was living in New York City, then immediately flew back.

On August 22, 1955, St. John spoke on the phone for the last time with Robert, who described him as "very despondent". St. John died either that night or early the following morning. The by-then divorced St. John was found at the 170 East 79th Street Manhattan penthouse apartment of Frances Stratford, with whom he had been involved since at least September 1954, when they took a vacation together to the Bahamas. The day before his death he had also called his son Michael, who was at work in the St. John Publishing office to tell him that he was being blackmailed. But he would not reveal his whereabouts. The police, pending an autopsy, listed the cause as an apparent overdose of sleeping pills, and gave his age as 54. He had been residing at the New York Athletic Club at the time of his death. St. John's son Michael compared his father's death with that of Dorothy Kilgallen and said that in addition to alcohol, his father was addicted to amphetamines.

== Magazines ==
The group of magazines published by St. John included crime fiction (Manhunt, Mantrap, Menace, Murder, Verdict), a Western digest (Gunsmoke), the scandal-exposé title Secret Life and the men's magazine Nugget. Manhunt began January 1953 as the monthly digest, Manhunt Detective Story Monthly. The title was shortened to Manhunt early in 1956. It expanded to a larger standard-size format from March 1957 to May 1958 but then returned to digest-size and a bimonthly schedule. The popularity of Manhunt kept it running for 114 issues until April–May 1967. Verdict ran as a digest-size monthly from June 1953 to September 1953 and was briefly titled Verdict Crime Detection Magazine (Aug.–Nov. 1956) before a shortening back to Verdict.

He acquired the 21-year-old publication Magazine Digest in 1950.

== Comic books ==
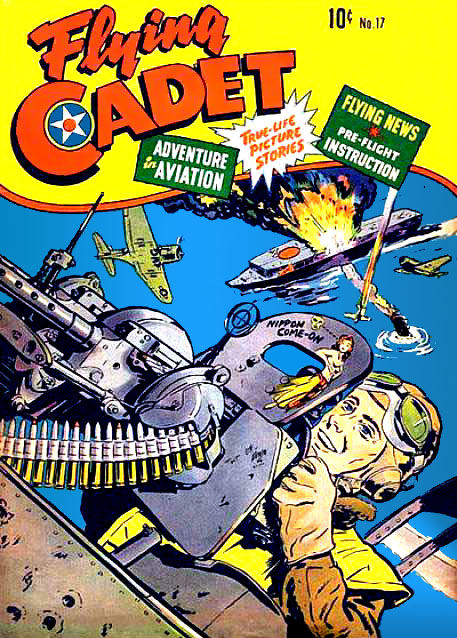
Flying Cadet #17 (Oct. 1944), cover artist unknown. The topless woman indicates this was not a comic aimed at children.

The company's comics include the first 3-D comic book, Three Dimension Comics #1 (Sept. 1953 oversize format, Oct. 1953 standard-size reprint), featuring the Terrytoons movie-cartoon character Mighty Mouse. According to Joe Kubert, co-creator with the brothers Norman Maurer and Leonard Maurer, it sold an exceptional 1.2 million copies at 25 cents apiece at a time when comics cost a dime. St. John also published the second 3-D comic, the aptly named 3-D Comics, the single issue of which incongruously billed itself as "World's First!"

Other St. John comic books included the first movie-comedian tie-in series, Abbott and Costello Comics; one of the first proto-graphic novels, the 25-cent "picture novel" It Rhymes with Lust (1950); and a five-issue series (Sept. 1953 – Oct. 1954), appearing under three titles, that introduced the enduring Kubert prehistoric hero Tor. In 1953, St. John took over a number of Ziff Davis comics titles, including the romance comics Cinderella Love and Romantic Love, the Western comic Kid Cowboy, and the jungle adventure title Wild Boy of the Congo.

St. John Publications utilized the first African-American comic-book artist in mainstream media, Matt Baker, who contributed to the ostensibly true-crime series Authentic Police Cases, the light humor comic Canteen Kate, the romance books Cinderella Love and Teen-Age Romances, and many others.

=== Mice and men ===
St. John acquired the license to publish comics based on the movie cartoons of producer Paul Terry. The Terrytoons properties, originally adapted to comic books by Timely Comics, the 1940s predecessor of Marvel Comics, included such characters as Mighty Mouse, Heckle and Jeckle, Dinky Duck, Gandy Goose, and Little Roquefort. The first such St. John comic was Mighty Mouse #5 (Aug. 1947), its numbering taken over from the Timely run.

The company expanded into licensed characters from another animation company, the joint Paramount Pictures-Famous Studios, which included the future Harvey Comics characters Casper the Friendly Ghost, Baby Huey (who premiered in that Casper the Friendly Ghost #1 before his March 3, 1950, screen debut, "Quack A Doodle Do"), and Little Audrey.

Little Eva, Audrey's lesser-known replacement, was added to the publishing schedule in 1952 after the Audrey license passed on to Harvey.

Continuing in the popular vein of reprinted comic strips, St. John published comic books of such gag strips as Moon Mullins and Nancy, and of the NEA syndicate's private detective adventure strip Vic Flint. This hardboiled fiction by the pseudonymous Michael O'Malley (writer Ernest Lynn and others) and artists Ralph Lane, Dean Miller, Art Sansom and John Lane, was reprinted in the comic books Vic Flint (#1–5?, Aug. 1948 – April 1949); all but the first issue of Fugitives from Justice (#1–5, 1953); and some issues of Authentic Police Cases (#1–38, 1948–1955).

=== Romance comics ===
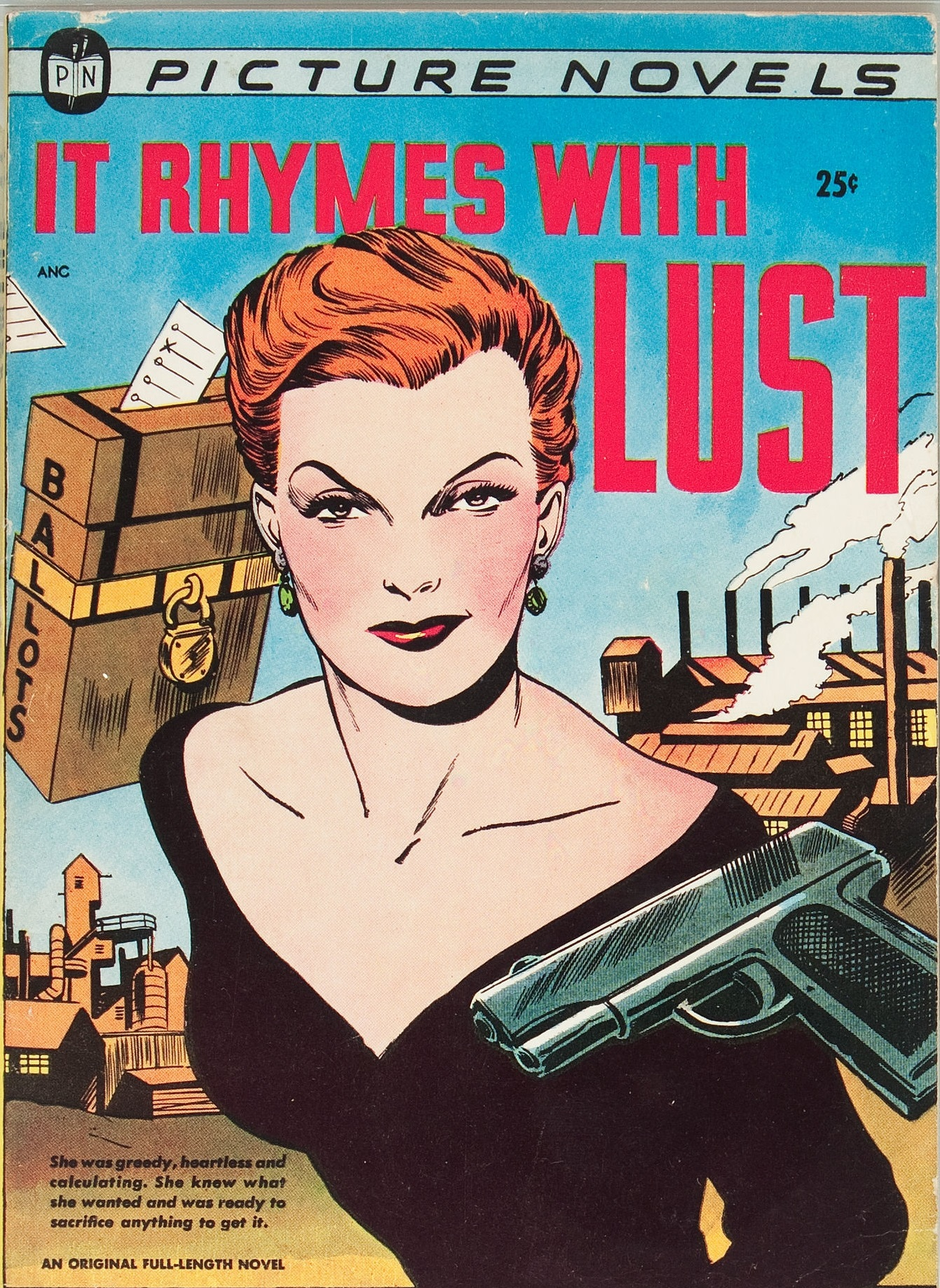
It Rhymes with Lust (1950), an early graphic-novel precursor. Cover art by Matt Baker and Ray Osrin.

St. John's first romance comic was Teen-Age Romances #1 (Jan. 1949), followed by ten issues of romance comics over the next nine months. St. John's Hollywood Confessions #1 (Oct. 1949) metamorphosed two issues later into Hollywood Pictorial, and then shifted from comic book to movie magazine (Hollywood Pictorial Western) with issue #4 (March 1950). That was the first title in what eventually became the St. John magazine group.

The company introduced several other, mostly short-lived original series from 1948 through 1953, including a rare, for the company, superhero series, Zip-Jet, starring a yellow-clad "supersonic enemy of evil" reprinted from Punch Comics' "Rocketman" feature. That and the two St. John series titled Atom-Age Combat directly reflected the era's Cold War "nuclear jitters" and popular culture fascination with the breaking of the sound barrier.

=== Pioneering "Picture Novels" ===
In 1950—more than 20 years before Gil Kane & Archie Goodwin's Blackmark and almost 30 before Don McGregor & Paul Gulacy's Sabre and Will Eisner's A Contract with God—St. John helped pioneer the medium that would become known as the graphic novel. The digest-sized, adult-oriented "Picture Novel" It Rhymes with Lust was a film noir-influenced slice of steeltown life starring a scheming, manipulative redhead named Rust. Touted as "an original full-length novel" on its cover, the book by pseudonymous writer "Drake Waller" (Arnold Drake and Leslie Waller), penciler Matt Baker and inker Ray Osrin, was sold at newsstands. It proved successful enough to lead to an unrelated second picture novel, The Case of the Winking Buddha, by pulp novelist Manning Lee Stokes and illustrator Charles Raab.
