= Graphic novel =

Book with primarily comics contents

A graphic novel is a self-contained, book-length form of sequential art (i.e. comics). The term graphic novel is often applied broadly, including fiction, non-fiction, and anthologized work, though this practice is highly contested by comics scholars and industry professionals. It is, at least in the United States, typically distinct from the term comic book, which is generally used for comics periodicals and trade paperbacks. It has also been described as a marketing term for comic books.

Fan historian Richard Kyle coined the term graphic novel in an essay in the November 1964 issue of the comics fanzine Capa-Alpha. The term gained popularity in the comics community after the publication of Will Eisner's A Contract with God (1978) and the start of the Marvel Graphic Novel line (1982) and became familiar to the public in the late 1980s after the commercial successes of the first volume of Art Spiegelman's Maus in 1986, the collected editions of Frank Miller's The Dark Knight Returns in 1986 and Alan Moore and Dave Gibbons' Watchmen in 1987. The Book Industry Study Group began using graphic novel as a category in book stores in 2001.

== Definition ==
The term is not strictly defined, though Merriam-Webster's dictionary definition is "a fictional story that is presented in comic-strip format and published as a book". Collections of comic books that do not form a continuous story, anthologies or collections of loosely related pieces, and even non-fiction are stocked by libraries and bookstores as graphic novels (similar to the manner in which dramatic stories are included in "comic" books). The term is also sometimes used to distinguish between works created as standalone stories, in contrast to collections or compilations of a story arc from a comic book series published in book form.

In continental Europe, both original book-length stories such as The Ballad of the Salty Sea (1967) by Hugo Pratt or La rivolta dei racchi (1967) by Guido Buzzelli, and collections of comics have been commonly published in hardcover volumes, often called albums, since the end of the 19th century (including such later Franco-Belgian comics series as The Adventures of Tintin in the 1930s).

== History ==
As the exact definition of the graphic novel is debated, the origins of the form are open to interpretation.

The Adventures of Obadiah Oldbuck is the oldest recognized American example of comics used to this end. It originated as the 1828 publication Histoire de Mr. Vieux Bois by Swiss caricaturist Rodolphe Töpffer, and was first published in English translation in 1841 by London's Tilt & Bogue, which used an 1833 Paris pirate edition. The first American edition was published in 1842 by Wilson & Company in New York City using the original printing plates from the 1841 edition. Another early predecessor is Journey to the Gold Diggins by Jeremiah Saddlebags by brothers J. A. D. and D. F. Read, inspired by The Adventures of Obadiah Oldbuck. In 1894, Caran d'Ache broached the idea of a "drawn novel" in a letter to the newspaper Le Figaro and started work on a 360-page wordless book (which was never published). In the United States, there is a long tradition of reissuing previously published comic strips in book form. In 1897, the Hearst Syndicate published such a collection of The Yellow Kid by Richard Outcault and it quickly became a best seller.

=== 1920s to 1960s ===
The 1920s saw a revival of the medieval woodcut tradition, with Belgian Frans Masereel cited as "the undisputed king" of this revival. His works include Passionate Journey (1919). American Lynd Ward also worked in this tradition, publishing Gods' Man, in 1929 and going on to publish more during the 1930s.

Other prototypical examples from this period include American Milt Gross's He Done Her Wrong (1930), a wordless comic published as a hardcover book, and Une semaine de bonté (1934), a novel in sequential images composed of collage by the surrealist painter Max Ernst. Similarly, Charlotte Salomon's Life? or Theater? (composed 1941–43) combines images, narrative, and captions.

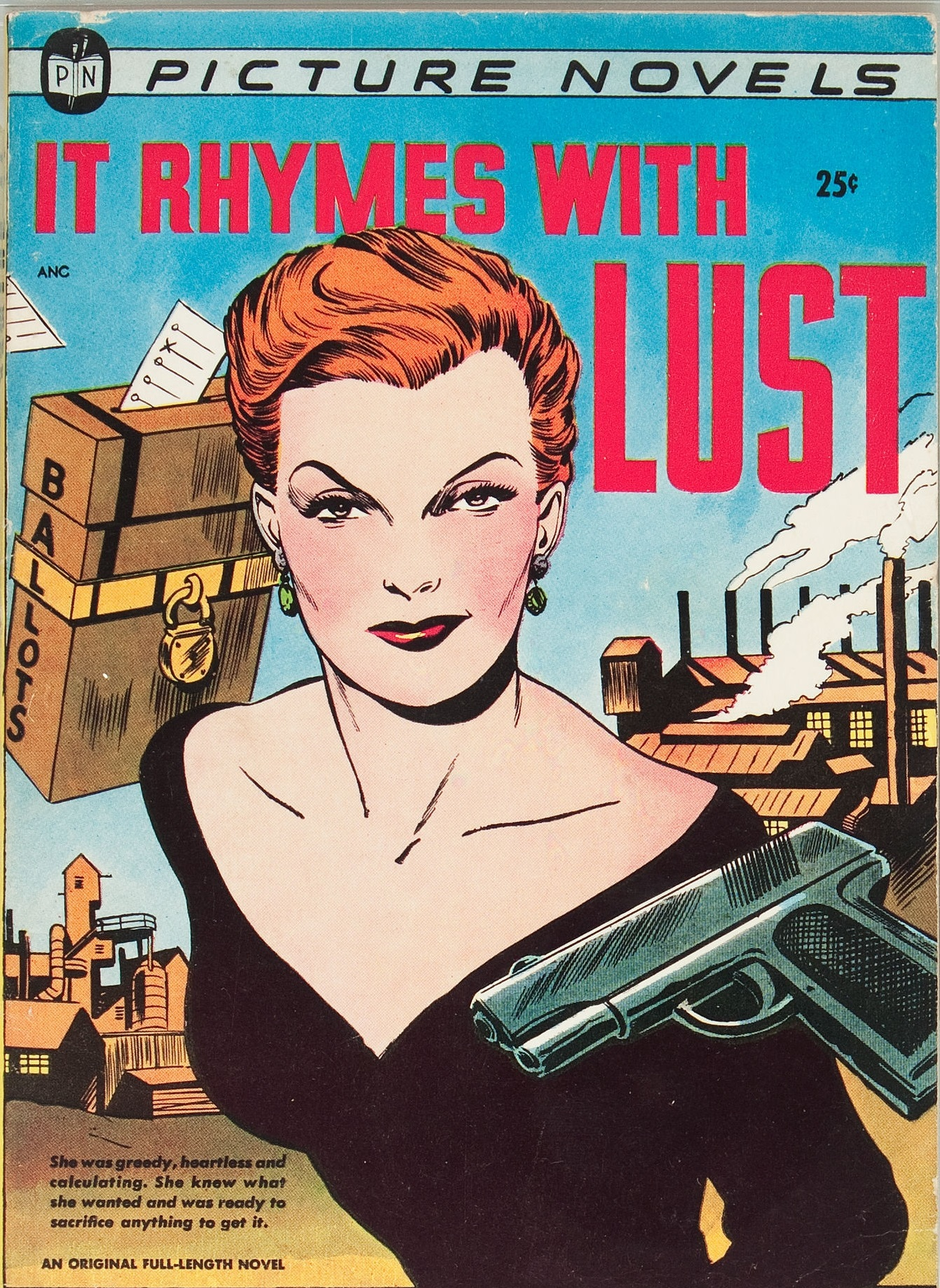
The digest-sized "picture novel" It Rhymes with Lust (1950), one precursor of the graphic novel. Cover art by Matt Baker and Ray Osrin.

The 1940s saw the launching of Classics Illustrated, a comic-book series that primarily adapted notable, public domain novels into standalone comic books for young readers. Citizen 13660, an illustrated, novel length retelling of Japanese internment during World War II, was published in 1946. In 1947, Fawcett Comics published Comics Novel #1: "Anarcho, Dictator of Death", a 52-page comic dedicated to one story. In 1950, St. John Publications produced the digest-sized, adult-oriented "picture novel" It Rhymes with Lust, a film noir-influenced slice of steeltown life starring a scheming, manipulative redhead named Rust. Touted as "an original full-length novel" on its cover, the 128-page digest by pseudonymous writer "Drake Waller" (Arnold Drake and Leslie Waller), penciler Matt Baker and inker Ray Osrin proved successful enough to lead to an unrelated second picture novel, The Case of the Winking Buddha by pulp novelist Manning Lee Stokes and illustrator Charles Raab. In the same year, Gold Medal Books released Mansion of Evil by Joseph Millard. Presaging Will Eisner's multiple-story graphic novel A Contract with God (1978), cartoonist Harvey Kurtzman wrote and drew the four-story mass-market paperback Harvey Kurtzman's Jungle Book (Ballantine Books #338K), published in 1959.

By the late 1960s, American comic book creators were becoming more adventurous with the form. Gil Kane and Archie Goodwin self-published a 40-page, magazine-format comics novel, His Name Is... Savage (Adventure House Press) in 1968—the same year Marvel Comics published two issues of The Spectacular Spider-Man in a similar format. Columnist and comic-book writer Steven Grant also argues that Stan Lee and Steve Ditko's Doctor Strange story in Strange Tales #130–146, although published serially from 1965 to 1966, is "the first American graphic novel". Similarly, critic Jason Sacks referred to the 13-issue "Panther's Rage"—comics' first-known titled, self-contained, multi-issue story arc—that ran from 1973 to 1975 in the Black Panther series in Marvel's Jungle Action as "Marvel's first graphic novel".

Meanwhile, in continental Europe, the tradition of collecting serials of popular strips such as The Adventures of Tintin or Asterix led to long-form narratives published initially as serials.

In January 1968, Vida del Che was published in Argentina, a graphic novel written by Héctor Germán Oesterheld and drawn by Alberto Breccia. The book told the story of Che Guevara in comics form, but the military dictatorship confiscated the books and destroyed them. It was later re-released in corrected versions.

By 1969, the author John Updike, who had entertained ideas of becoming a cartoonist in his youth, addressed the Bristol Literary Society, on "the death of the novel". Updike offered examples of new areas of exploration for novelists, declaring he saw "no intrinsic reason why a doubly talented artist might not arise and create a comic strip novel masterpiece".

=== Modern era ===
Detail from Blackmark (1971) by scripter Archie Goodwin and artist-plotter Gil Kane

Gil Kane and Archie Goodwin's Blackmark (1971), a science fiction/sword-and-sorcery paperback published by Bantam Books, did not use the term originally; the back-cover blurb of the 30th-anniversary edition (ISBN 978-1-56097-456-7) calls it, retroactively, the first American graphic novel. The Academy of Comic Book Arts presented Kane with a special 1971 Shazam Award for what it called "his paperback comics novel". Whatever the nomenclature, Blackmark is a 119-page story of comic-book art, with captions and word balloons, published in a traditional book format.

European creators were also experimenting with the longer narrative in comics form. In the United Kingdom, Raymond Briggs was producing works such as Father Christmas (1972) and The Snowman (1978), which he himself described as being from the "bottomless abyss of strip cartooning", although they, along with such other Briggs works as the more mature When the Wind Blows (1982), have been re-marketed as graphic novels in the wake of the term's popularity. Briggs noted, however, that he did not like that term too much.

=== First self-proclaimed graphic novels: 1976–1978 ===
In 1976, the term "graphic novel" appeared in print to describe three separate works:

- Chandler: Red Tide by Jim Steranko, published in August 1976 under the Fiction Illustrated imprint and released in both regular 8.5 x 11" size, and a digest size designed to be sold on newsstands, used the term "graphic novel" in its introduction and "a visual novel" on its cover, predating by two years the usage of this term for Will Eisner's A Contract with God. It is therefore considered the first modern graphic novel to be done as an original work, and not collected from previously published segments.
- Bloodstar by Richard Corben (adapted from a story by Robert E. Howard), Morning Star Press, 1976, also a non-reprinted original presentation, used the term 'graphic novel' to categorize itself as well on its dust jacket and introduction.
- George Metzger's Beyond Time and Again, serialized in underground comix from 1967 to 1972, was subtitled "A Graphic Novel" on the inside title page when collected as a 48-page, black-and-white, hardcover book published by Kyle & Wheary.

The following year, Terry Nantier, who had spent his teenage years living in Paris, returned to the United States and formed Flying Buttress Publications, later to incorporate as NBM Publishing (Nantier, Beall, Minoustchine), and published Racket Rumba, a 50-page spoof of the noir-detective genre, written and drawn by the single-name French artist Loro. Nantier followed this with Enki Bilal's The Call of the Stars. The company marketed these works as "graphic albums".

The first six issues of writer-artist Jack Katz's 1974 Comics and Comix Co. series The First Kingdom were collected as a trade paperback (Pocket Books, March 1978), which described itself as "the first graphic novel". Issues of the comic had described themselves as "graphic prose", or simply as a novel.

Similarly, Sabre: Slow Fade of an Endangered Species by writer Don McGregor and artist Paul Gulacy (Eclipse Books, August 1978) — the first graphic novel sold in the newly created "direct market" of United States comic-book shops — was called a "graphic album" by the author in interviews, though the publisher dubbed it a "comic novel" on its credits page. "Graphic album" was also the term used the following year by Gene Day for his hardcover short-story collection Future Day (Flying Buttress Press).

Another early graphic novel, though it carried no self-description, was The Silver Surfer (Simon & Schuster/Fireside Books, August 1978), by Marvel Comics' Stan Lee and Jack Kirby. Significantly, this was published by a traditional book publisher and distributed through bookstores, as was cartoonist Jules Feiffer's Tantrum (Alfred A. Knopf, 1979) described on its dust jacket as a "novel-in-pictures".

=== Adoption of the term ===
Sabre (1978), one of the first modern graphic novels. Cover art by Paul Gulacy.

Hyperbolic descriptions of longer comic books as "novels" appear on covers as early as the 1940s. Early issues of DC Comics' All-Flash, for example, described their contents as "novel-length stories" and "full-length four chapter novels".

In its earliest known citation, comic-book reviewer Richard Kyle used the term "graphic novel" in Capa-Alpha #2 (November 1964), a newsletter published by the Comic Amateur Press Alliance, and again in an article in Bill Spicer's magazine Fantasy Illustrated #5 (Spring 1966). Kyle, inspired by European and East Asian graphic albums (especially Japanese manga), used the label to designate comics of an artistically "serious" sort. Following this, Spicer, with Kyle's acknowledgment, edited and published a periodical titled Graphic Story Magazine in the fall of 1967. The Sinister House of Secret Love #2 (Jan. 1972), one of DC Comics' line of extra-length, 48-page comics, specifically used the phrase "a graphic novel of Gothic terror" on its cover.

The term "graphic novel" began to grow in popularity months after it appeared on the cover of the trade paperback edition (though not the hardcover edition) of Will Eisner's A Contract with God (October 1978). This collection of short stories was a mature, complex work focusing on the lives of ordinary people in the real world based on Eisner's own experiences.

One scholar used graphic novels to introduce the concept of graphiation, the theory that the entire personality of an artist is visible through his or her visual representation of a certain character, setting, event, or object in a novel, and can work as a means to examine and analyze drawing style.

Even though Eisner's A Contract with God was published in 1978 by a smaller company, Baronet Press, it took Eisner over a year to find a publishing house that would allow his work to reach the mass market. In its introduction, Eisner cited Lynd Ward's 1930s woodcuts as an inspiration.

The critical and commercial success of A Contract with God helped to establish the term "graphic novel" in common usage, and many sources have incorrectly credited Eisner with being the first to use it. These included the Time magazine website in 2003, which said in its correction: "Eisner acknowledges that the term 'graphic novel' had been coined prior to his book. But, he says, 'I had not known at the time that someone had used that term before'. Nor does he take credit for creating the first graphic book".

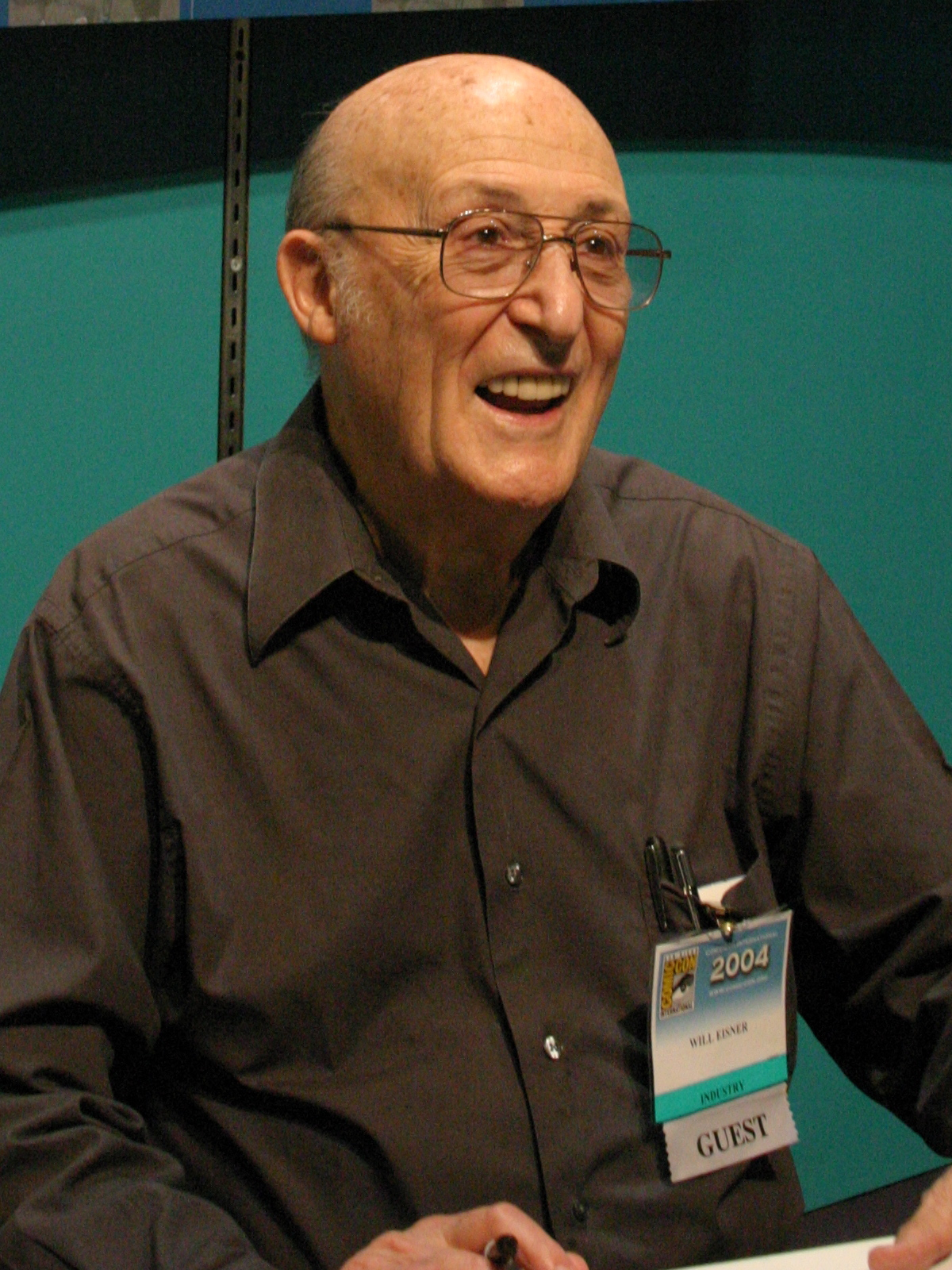
Will Eisner in 2004

One of the earliest contemporaneous applications of the term post-Eisner came in 1979, when Blackmark's sequel—published a year after A Contract with God though written and drawn in the early 1970s—was labeled a "graphic novel" on the cover of Marvel Comics' black-and-white comics magazine Marvel Preview #17 (Winter 1979), where Blackmark: The Mind Demons premiered: its 117-page contents remained intact, but its panel-layout reconfigured to fit 62 pages.

Following this, Marvel from 1982 to 1988 published the Marvel Graphic Novel line of 10" × 7" trade paperbacks—although numbering them like comic books, from #1 (Jim Starlin's The Death of Captain Marvel) to #35 (Dennis O'Neil, Mike Kaluta, and Russ Heath's Hitler's Astrologer, starring the radio and pulp fiction character the Shadow, and released in hardcover). Marvel commissioned original graphic novels from such creators as John Byrne, J. M. DeMatteis, Steve Gerber, graphic-novel pioneer McGregor, Frank Miller, Bill Sienkiewicz, Walt Simonson, Charles Vess, and Bernie Wrightson. While most of these starred Marvel superheroes, others, such as Rick Veitch's Heartburst featured original SF/fantasy characters; others still, such as Jon J Muth's Dracula, featured adaptations of literary stories or characters; and one, Sam Glanzman's A Sailor's Story, was a true-life, World War II naval tale.

In Frank Miller's introduction to First Comics' English reprint of Lone Wolf and Cub #2 (June 1987), he discussed the mixed message of the term "graphic novel" replacing "comics" in popular culture:

In recent years, the more respectable sounding title of "graphic novel" has begun to catch on. Unfortunately, its been used almost exclusively as a designation of format, rather than content, indicating that the comic is printed on glossy paper with painted color as a trade paperback. But the novel, in prose, is an established literary form, larger and greater in scope than the short story. A graphic novel, if the term is going to mean anything more than "deluxe format" or "Baxter book", should be as rich in texture and as full of story as its prose counterpart.

The 1987 U.S. (left) and 1995 U.S./UK/Canada (right) collected editions of Watchmen, published by DC Comics and Titan Books, respectively

Cartoonist Art Spiegelman's Pulitzer Prize-winning Maus (1980-91), helped establish both the term and the concept of graphic novels in the minds of the mainstream public. Two DC Comics book reprints of self-contained miniseries did likewise, though they were not originally published as graphic novels: Batman: The Dark Knight Returns (1986), a collection of Frank Miller's four-part comic-book series featuring an older Batman faced with the problems of a dystopian future; and Watchmen (1986-1987), a collection of Alan Moore and Dave Gibbons' 12-issue limited series in which Moore notes he "set out to explore, amongst other things, the dynamics of power in a post-Hiroshima world". These works and others were reviewed in newspapers and magazines, leading to increased coverage. Sales of graphic novels increased, with Batman: The Dark Knight Returns, for example, lasting 40 weeks on a UK best-seller list.

In India, the graphic novel Bhimayana (2011) has been studied as an example of how the form can move beyond comics into a serious literary genre that addresses caste and social justice.

=== European adoption of the term ===
Outside North America, Eisner's A Contract with God and Spiegelman's Maus led to the popularization of the expression "graphic novel" as well. Until then, most European countries used neutral, descriptive terminology that referred to the form of the medium, not the contents or the publishing form. In Francophone Europe for example, the expression bandes dessinées — which literally translates as "drawn strips" – is used, while the terms stripverhaal ("strip story") and tegneserie ("drawn series") are used by the Dutch/Flemish and Scandinavians respectively. European comics studies scholars have observed that Americans originally used graphic novel for everything that deviated from their standard, 32-page comic book format, meaning that all larger-sized, longer Franco-Belgian comic albums, regardless of their contents, fell under the heading.

Writer-artist Bryan Talbot claims that the first collection of his The Adventures of Luther Arkwright, published by Proutt in 1982, was the first British graphic novel.

American comic critics have occasionally referred to European graphic novels as "Euro-comics", and attempts were made in the late 1980s to cross-fertilize the American market with these works. American publishers Catalan Communications and NBM Publishing released translated titles, predominantly from the backlog catalogs of Casterman and Les Humanoïdes Associés.

=== Autobiographical graphic novels ===
"As Leigh Gilmore explains, autobiography 'draws its authority less from its resemblance to real life than from its proximity to discourses of truth and identity, less from reference or mimesis than from the cultural power of truth telling'". Maus was the first major autobiographical graphic novel telling the story of what life was like during the Holocaust. Other popular autobiographical graphic novels are Marjane Satrapi's Persepolis, and Alison Bechdel's Fun Home. Persepolis is about Satrapi growing up during the Iranian Revolution; it's a book telling her story but also what all the Iranians went through during this violent time in their history. Fun Home is a book dealing with the author's complicated relationship with her father and both her and her father coming out. Autobiographical stories always vary because people have so many different experiences and no two stories are the same.

== Criticism of the term ==
Some in the comics community have objected to the term graphic novel on the grounds that it is unnecessary, or that its usage has been corrupted by commercial interests. Watchmen writer Alan Moore believes:

It's a marketing term... that I never had any sympathy with. The term 'comic' does just as well for me ... The problem is that 'graphic novel' just came to mean 'expensive comic book' and so what you'd get is people like DC Comics or Marvel Comics—because 'graphic novels' were getting some attention, they'd stick six issues of whatever worthless piece of crap they happened to be publishing lately under a glossy cover and call it The She-Hulk Graphic Novel ..."

Glen Weldon, author and cultural critic, writes:

It's a perfect time to retire terms like "graphic novel" and "sequential art", which piggyback on the language of other, wholly separate mediums. What's more, both terms have their roots in the need to dissemble and justify, thus both exude a sense of desperation, a gnawing hunger to be accepted.

Author Daniel Raeburn wrote: "I snicker at the neologism first for its insecure pretension - the literary equivalent of calling a garbage man a 'sanitation engineer' - and second because a 'graphic novel' is in fact the very thing it is ashamed to admit: a comic book, rather than a comic pamphlet or comic magazine".

Writer Neil Gaiman, responding to a claim that he does not write comic books but graphic novels, said the commenter "meant it as a compliment, I suppose. But all of a sudden I felt like someone who'd been informed that she wasn't actually a hooker; that in fact she was a lady of the evening".

Responding to writer Douglas Wolk's quip that the difference between a graphic novel and a comic book is "the binding", Bone creator Jeff Smith said: "I kind of like that answer. Because 'graphic novel' ... I don't like that name. It's trying too hard. It is a comic book. But there is a difference. And the difference is, a graphic novel is a novel in the sense that there is a beginning, a middle and an end". The Times writer Giles Coren said: "To call them graphic novels is to presume that the novel is in some way 'higher' than the karmicbwurk (comic book), and that only by being thought of as a sort of novel can it be understood as an art form".

Some alternative cartoonists have coined their own terms for extended comics narratives. The cover of Daniel Clowes' Ice Haven (2001) refers to the book as "a comic-strip novel", with Clowes having noted that he "never saw anything wrong with the comic book". The cover of Craig Thompson's Blankets calls it "an illustrated novel".

== See also ==
- Artist's book – Work of art in the form of a book
  - Collage novel – Term used for various forms of novel: in this context, a form of artist's book approaching closely (but preceding) the graphic novel
- Comic album – Comics of the classic Franco-Belgian style
- Graphic narrative – Sequence of images used for storytelling
- Graphic non-fiction – Literary genre
- List of award-winning graphic novels
- List of best-selling comic series
- Livre d'art – Books in which the illustration is predominant, profusely illustrated books
- Wordless novel – Sequences of pictures used to tell a story

== Bibliography ==
- Aldama, Frederick Luis; González, Christopher (2016). Graphic borders: Latino comic books past, present, and future. Austin: University of Texas Press. ISBN 978-1-4773-0914-8. OCLC 920966195.
- Arnold, Andrew D. "The Graphic Novel Silver Anniversary", Time, November 14, 2003
- Beerbohm, Robert Lee; Wheeler, Doug; West, Richard Samuel; Olson, Richard (2008). "The Victorian Age: Comic Strips and Books 1646–1900 Origins of Early American Comic Strips Before The Yellow Kid", in Overstreet Comic Book Price Guide #38, pp. 330–366.
- Couch, Chris. "The Publication and Formats of Comics, Graphic Novels, and Tankobon", Image & Narrative #1 (Dec. 2000)
- Duncan, Randy; Smith, Matthew J. (2009). The Power of Comics. Continuum International Publishing Group. ISBN 978-0-8264-2936-0.
- Gravett, Paul (2005). Graphic Novels: Everything You Need to Know. New York:Harper Design. ISBN 978-0-06082-4-259
- Groensteen, Thierry (2007). The System of Comics Jackson:University Press of Mississippi. ISBN 978-1-60473-259-7.
- Markstein, Don (2010). "Glossary of Specialized Cartoon-related Words and Phrases Used in Don Markstein's Toonopedia". Don Markstein's Toonopedia. Archived from the original on October 16, 2009.
- McCloud, Scott (1993). Understanding Comics: The Invisible Art. Tundra Publishing.
- Tychinski, Stan. "A Brief History of the Graphic Novel". brodart.com. (n.d., 2004)
- Weiner, Stephen; Couch, Chris (2004). Faster than a speeding bullet: the rise of the graphic novel. NBM. ISBN 978-1-56163-368-5
- Weiner, Robert G; Weiner, Stephen (2010). Graphic Novels and Comics in Libraries and Archives. McFarland. ISBN 978-0-7864-4302-4.
