= It Rhymes with Lust =

Book by Arnold Drake

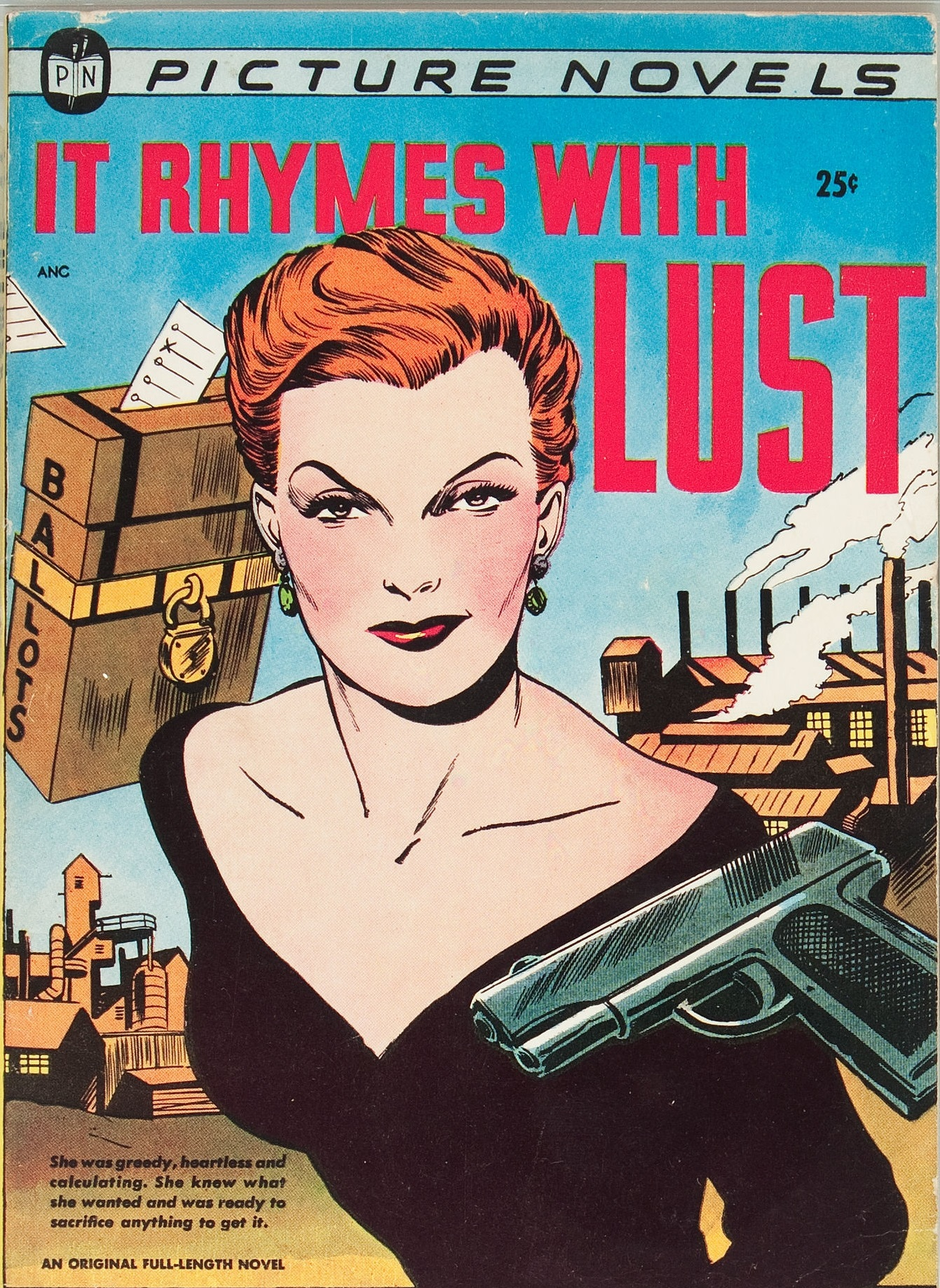
Original cover to It Rhymes with Lust, one precursor of the graphic novel. Cover art by Matt Baker and Ray Osrin.

It Rhymes with Lust is a "picture novel" published in 1950. It is an early example of a graphic novel. It was written by Arnold Drake and Leslie Waller (under the pseudonym "Drake Waller"), with black-and-white art by Matt Baker and inker Ray Osrin. It was published by the comic book and magazine company St. John Publications. Drake would go to write for comics publishers DC and Marvel, for which he created such characters as Doom Patrol, Deadman and the original Guardians of the Galaxy.

== Plot ==
Hal Weber, a handsome, downtrodden newspaperman, arrives at Copper City to take a job offered by a former lover, Rust Masson. Rust is the cunning, beautiful widow of the prominent political leader Buck Masson. She now intends to take over the political fortunes of the city for herself, with the assistance of her cold-blooded, violent henchman, Monk Shirl. Her stepdaughter, Audrey Masson, warns Hal of Rust's machinations, but Hal is smitten and easily ensnared by Rust's deceitful attractions. Meanwhile, a rival political power, Marcus Jeffers, also schemes to gain political control, but he is outwitted by Rust and violently beaten by her henchmen, with Hal forced to participate.

Plagued by self-loathing, Hal is finally convinced by Audrey's innocence and probity to stand up to Rust. He writes a lengthy expose of Rust and her activities in his newspaper, which causes the city to rise up against her. In a climactic confrontation at the nearby mining facility, Rust's efforts to quell a popular uprising turn fatal when one of her henchmen begins shooting at the miners. Rust and Monk climb into an elevated mining bucket to address the agitated crowd, with Rust proclaiming that "Power belongs to whoever has the guts to take it!". At that moment, Marcus Jeffers, recovered from his injuries, rushes to the control panel, intending to dump the mining car carrying Rust and Monk. Though he is shot to death by Monk, Jeffers is able to set the cars in motion, sending Rust and Monk toppling out of the car to their deaths in the mine pit below. Hal and Audrey, observing from the ground, are cheered by the crowd. Later that evening, Hal realizes he loves Audrey alone, and the couple embrace.

== Publication history ==
According to Drake, he and Waller created the concept of "picture novels" in 1949 while in college in New York City, conceiving "a more developed comic book—a deliberate bridge between comic books and book books. ... What we planned was a series of picture novels that were, essentially, action, mystery, Western and romance movies on paper". Armed with a two-page sample of an example story, "One Man Too Many!", Drake and Waller convinced Archer St. John of St. John Publications to launch a line of mass market paperbacks containing original comics work that would appeal to the general public.

== Later rediscovery ==
Comics writer-artist Michael T. Gilbert wrote in liner notes for 2006 reprinting in The Comics Journal that it "reads like a B-movie potboiler, bubbling over with greed, sex, and political corruption". The cover tag line reads: "She was greedy, heartless and calculating. She knew what she wanted and was ready to sacrifice anything to get it".

St. John published a second book in the line, the mystery The Case of the Winking Buddha, by pulp novelist Manning Lee Stokes and illustrator Charles Raab. Neither book sold well, and the line was cancelled.

It Rhymes with Lust was reprinted in its entirety in the 30th anniversary issue (#277) of The Comics Journal. In March 2007 Dark Horse Books (Dark Horse Comics' book publishing arm) published a softcover reprint with a new afterword by Drake.
