= Matt Baker (artist) =

American artist (1921–1959)

- Baker (left) and publisher Archer St. John at Grauman's Chinese Theatre (undated)
- Born: Clarence Matthew Baker; December 10, 1921 Forsyth County, North Carolina, U.S.
- Died: August 11, 1959 (aged 37) New York City, U.S.
- Area: Penciller
- Pseudonym: Matt Bakerino
- Notable works: Phantom Lady

Clarence Matthew Baker (December 10, 1921 – August 11, 1959) was an American comic book artist and illustrator, best known for drawing early comics heroines such as the costumed crimefighter Phantom Lady, and romance comics. Active in the 1940s and 1950s Golden Age of comic books, he is one of the first known African-American artists to find success in the comic-book industry. He also penciled St. John Publications' digest-sized "picture novel" It Rhymes with Lust (1950), the first graphic novel despite that term not having been coined at the time.

Baker was inducted into the Will Eisner Comic Book Hall of Fame in 2009. His influence can be seen in the work of artists such as Dave Stevens and Adam Hughes.

== Biography ==
=== Early years ===
Baker was born December 10, 1921, in Forsyth County, North Carolina. At a young age he relocated with his family to Pittsburgh, Pennsylvania, and after graduating high school in 1940, moved to Washington, D.C. Prevented by a heart condition from being drafted into the U.S. military during World War II, he began studying art at Cooper Union, in New York City. He entered comics through the Jerry Iger Studio, one of the 1930s to 1940s "packagers" that provided outsourced comics to publishers entering the new medium. Iger recalled that Baker came into his studio with a single sample of a color sketch in his portfolio; he thought the woman was so naturally beautiful that he hired Baker on the spot, as a background artist before he was given his first scripts. Baker's first confirmed comics work is penciling and inking the women in the 12-page "Sheena, Queen of the Jungle" story in Fiction House's Jumbo Comics #69 (cover-dated Nov. 1944), otherwise penciled by Robert Webb and Alex Blum.

Much of Baker's work was originally penciled backgrounds as well as female figures for other artists, and most of his work has been inked over, with the inker credited for his work. He quickly developed a reputation as one of the best "Good Girl" artists in the business for his attention to detail when drawing women.

During this period, known as the Golden Age of Comic Books, Baker did work for publishers including Fiction House, Fox Comics, Quality Comics, and St. John Publications. In later years, he independently teamed with inker Jon D'Agostino under the pseudonym "Matt Bakerino" at Charlton Comics.

=== Personal life ===
Baker's friend Frank Giusto and artist Lee J. Ames have said that Baker was gay. Baker's brother Fred Robinson added of Baker and St. John Publications publisher Archer St. John, "They had a very close relationship. I don't know exactly what it was."

=== Phantom Lady ===
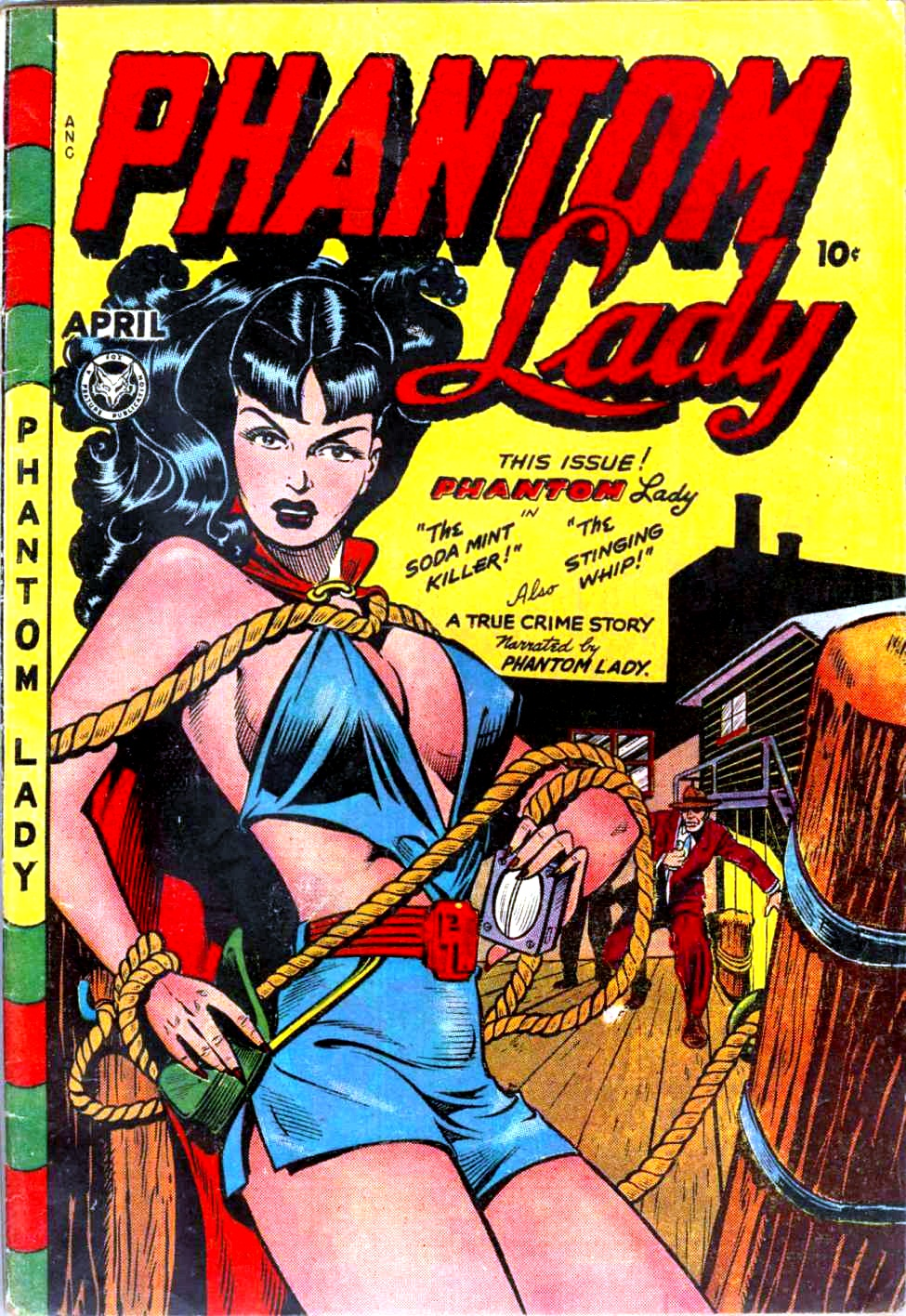
Phantom Lady #17 (April 1948). This Baker cover appeared in the book Seduction of the Innocent.

The character Phantom Lady, created by Arthur Peddy, had originated in 1941 as a Quality Comics feature supplied by the Iger Studio. Cartoonist Frank Borth later took over the art. After Quality dropped the feature, which had appeared in Police Comics #1-23 (Aug. 1941 – Oct. 1943), Iger supplied it to Fox Comics. Baker redesigned the character into her best-known incarnation. This version (generally but unconfirmably credited to writer Ruth Roche) debuted in Fox's Phantom Lady #13 (August 1947), the premiere issue after taking over the numbering of the canceled comic Wotalife; the title ran through issue #23 (April 1949). Baker's Phantom Lady also appeared as a backup feature in All Top Comics #9-16 (Jan. 1948 – March 1949).

When psychiatrist Frederick Wertham claimed comics had ill effects on a child's psychological development, he used Baker's Phantom Lady #17 as a key sample. These criticisms led to the 1954 foundation for the Comics Code Authority and decades of industry-controlled censorship.

=== Other work ===
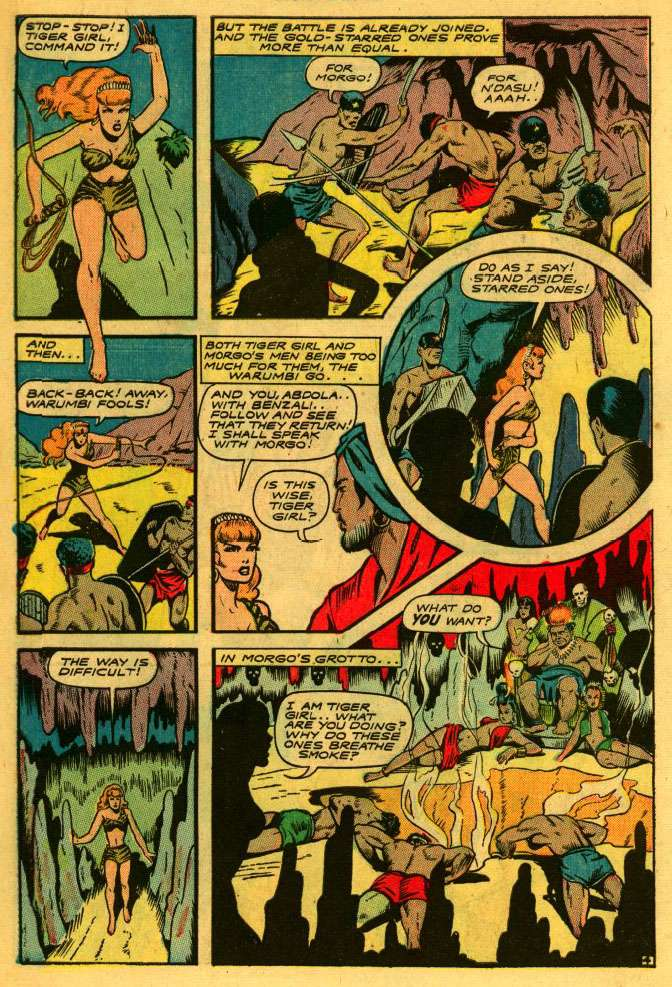
Page from Fight Comics # 40, Oct. 1945, Fiction House.

His other artwork for comic books includes the light-humor military title Canteen Kate, for which Baker drew all 22 installments, as well as stories in the suspense anthology Tales of The Mysterious Traveler; the comedy-adventure feature "Sky Girl" in Fiction House's Jumbo Comics, with originals and later reprints running from #69-139 (November 1944 – December 1952); the jungle adventure "Tiger Girl"; "Flamingo", "South Sea Girl", "Glory Forbes", "Kayo Kirby"; and "Risks Unlimited". Baker illustrated Lorna Doone for Classic Comics in December 1946, his one and only contribution to the well-known series. He is the generally credited but unconfirmed artist for Fox's Rulah, Jungle Goddess #17–27 (Aug. 1948 – June 1949, the title's complete run after having taken over the numbering of the defunct Zoot Comics). He also produced Flamingo as a syndicated comic strip from 1952 through 1954. His pen names include Curt Davis. Baker shaped women into classy, realistic beauties, full of character in their own stories as opposed to the ways women were portrayed in other comics of the time.

In addition to several romance comics and other titles for St. John Publications, Baker penciled an early form of graphic novel, St. John's digest-sized "picture novel" It Rhymes with Lust (1950), with writers Arnold Drake and Leslie Waller, writing under the pseudonym "Drake Waller."

Baker also created or co-created what writer John Arcudi calls "the first known black hero in American comics." The Tarzan-like jungle hero Voodah, drawn by Baker and scripted by an unknown writer, debuted in the publisher McCombs' Crown Comics #3 (cover-date Fall 1945, on-sale date Sept. 19, 1945). As the Grand Comics Database states, based on art credits from "The Matt Baker Checklist" by Alberto Becattini and Jim Vadeboncoeur Jr. in Matt Baker: The Art of Glamour (cited under References), "Voodah is colored like a native African in this comic, but after this issue he is colored like a Caucasian." He additionally is Caucasian on the cover.

=== Later work and death ===
Later in the decade, Baker freelanced for Atlas Comics, the 1950s forerunner of Marvel Comics, beginning with a five-page anthological story generally, if unconfirmably, credited to writer-editor Stan Lee, in the omnibus title Gunsmoke Western #32 (Dec. 1955). At some point during this period, working through artist Vince Colletta's studio, Baker went on to draw stories for Atlas' Western Outlaws, Quick Trigger Action, Frontier Western, and Wild Western; more prolifically for the company's romance comics Love Romances, My Own Romance, and Teen-Age Romance; and one story each for the supernatural/science fiction anthologies Strange Tales, World of Fantasy, and Tales to Astonish ("I Fell to the Center of the Earth!" in issue #2, March 1959). Baker also supplied artwork for the Dell Movie Classic edition of King Richard and the Crusaders.

In the late fifties, he branched out into illustration work, for instance for the 16-page illustrated condensation he did of Howard J. Lewis' The Complete Guide to Better Bowling (1956, Maco Magazine Corporation) for the General Motors' Information Rack Service number 1R-58-46 and the early issues of the St. John detective pulp digest Manhunt

His last known confirmed work is the six-page "I Gave Up the Man I Love!" in Atlas Comics' My Own Romance #73 (Jan. 1960). His last known work as generally credited but unconfirmed is the first page of the six-page story "Happily Ever After" in Marvel's Love Romances #90 (Nov. 1960).

He died of a heart attack on August 11, 1959, in New York City.

== Awards ==
Baker was inducted into the Will Eisner Comic Book Hall of Fame in 2009.
