= Arnold Drake =

American comic book writer and screenwriter (1924–2007)

- Born: March 1, 1924 New York City, U.S.
- Died: March 12, 2007 (aged 83) New York City, U.S.
- Area: Writer
- Notable works: Deadman; Doom Patrol; Guardians of the Galaxy; Phantom Stranger
- Awards: Alley Award – Best Full-Length Story 1967 "Who's Been Lying in My Grave?"; Alley Award – Best New Strip 1967 "Deadman"; Bill Finger Award – Excellence in Comics Writing 2005; Will Eisner Comic Book Hall of Fame 2008

Arnold Drake (March 1, 1924 – March 12, 2007) was an American comic book writer and screenwriter best known for co-creating the DC Comics characters Deadman and the Doom Patrol, and the Marvel Comics characters the Guardians of the Galaxy, Havok and Polaris, as well as writing scripts for the Phantom Stranger comic, among others.

Drake was posthumously inducted into the Will Eisner Comic Book Hall of Fame in 2008.

== Biography ==
=== Early life and career ===
Arnold Drake was the third child of Max Druckman, a Manhattan furniture dealer who died in June 1966 at his home in Forest Hills, Queens, New York City, and Pearl Cohen. His middle brother, Ervin Drake, born Ervin Maurice Druckman, and the eldest brother, Milton, both became notable songwriters. His family was Jewish.

At age 12, Drake contracted scarlet fever, confining him to bed for a year, a time he spent drawing his own comic strip creations. Years later, turning to writing, he studied journalism at the University of Missouri and later at New York University.

Collaborating with co-writer Leslie Waller (together using the pseudonym Drake Waller) and artist Matt Baker, Drake wrote St. John Publications' pioneering It Rhymes with Lust, a proto-graphic novel comics magazine sold on newsstands in 1950. At some unspecified point before or after this, he met a neighbor of one of his brothers: Bob Kane, the co-creator of Batman for one of DC Comics' precursor companies. After collaborating with Drake on some projects, Kane introduced Drake to editors at DC.

Comic books during this time did not routinely list creator credits; historians have, however, pinpointed Drake's first DC work as the first seven pages of the eight-page Batman story "The Return of Mister Future" in Batman #98 (March 1956). Soon, Drake was scripting stories across a variety of genres for DC, from adventure drama ("Fireman Farrell" in Showcase #1, April 1956, drawn by John Prentice) to humor (1960s stories for the company's Bob Hope and Jerry Lewis comics) to mystery and supernatural fiction (the anthology series House of Mystery) to science fiction (the feature "Tommy Tomorrow" in World's Finest Comics #102, June 1959, and elsewhere, and the feature "Space Ranger" in several issues of Tales of the Unexpected, to give a sampling).

=== DC Comics creations ===
In 1962, Drake and his friend, Bob Haney discovered the product of a small company distributed by National Periodical Publications' Independent News, Marvel Comics, and were impressed by its bold new quality. However, when the pair confronted National's publisher, Irwin Donenfeld, about the new competition, they were frustrated by his curt dismissal of the rival, citing their current large revenues.

In 1963, as Drake had warned, Marvel's increasingly profitable circulation increased enough to force Independent News to allow it to publish more titles. Meanwhile, editor Murray Boltinoff asked Drake to develop a feature to run in the anthology series My Greatest Adventure. Given the assignment on a Friday with a script due that Tuesday, and inspired to emulate Marvel's idea for superheroes with more character depth, Drake conceived of what would become the superhero team the Doom Patrol, and turned to another DC writer, Bob Haney, to co-plot and co-script the first adventure. Artist Bruno Premiani designed the characters. Drake would subsequently script every Doom Patrol story, with Premiani drawing virtually all, from the team's debut in My Greatest Adventure #80 (June 1963) through the series retitling to The Doom Patrol with issue #86 (March 1964), to the final issue of its initial run, #121 (Oct. 1968). Drake and Bob Brown introduced Beast Boy in Doom Patrol #99 (Nov. 1965).

Meanwhile, Drake noticed that Marvel Comics published a series of their own, The Uncanny X-Men, barely a few months later that seemed to mirror his own series' concepts in many respects. These included the concept of a wheelchair-using mentor leading a team of outcast superheroes who often clashed with a team of villains called the Brotherhood of Evil Mutants that seemed too close to the Doom Patrol's own enemies, the Brotherhood of Evil. However, Drake found no support for his complaints from National's editorial staff until Drake was forced to concede at that time that it could have been a coincidence. The Doom Patrol bears a strong resemblance to Marvel's older series about another super-powered quartet, the Fantastic Four: Elasti-Girl of the Doom Patrol has abilities similar to Mr. Fantastic, Negative Man's powers are similar to those of the Human Torch, Robot-Man is like the Thing (an extraordinarily strong man bitter about being trapped in a freakish body), and the Chief is behind the scenes as the Invisible Girl is invisible.

Premiani and Boltinoff appeared as themselves in the final story, discussing the impending demise of the team, but Drake, who had included himself in the script as well, did not. In 1981, Drake said that DC publisher Irwin Donenfeld had ordered him removed from the story because Drake by then had left to work at rival Marvel Comics, following a dispute with Donenfeld over Drake's DC page rate. Drake said he consented to complete the script because of his friendship with Boltinoff. Comics historian Mark Evanier believes that, additionally, Drake, among others, was "ousted" for being "a loud voice in a writers' revolt during which several of the firm's longtime freelancers were demanding health insurance, reprint fees, and better pay."

By this time, Drake and artist Win Mortimer had co-created DC's "Stanley and His Monster", a whimsical feature about a 6-year-old boy and his large, tusked, pink-furred and hardly ferocious "pet", which debuted in the talking animal comic The Fox and the Crow #95 (Jan. 1966). One comics historian hailed the feature as a precursor of Bill Watterson's comic strip Calvin & Hobbes, "where a boy keeps company with a marvelous being, the very existence of which is unknown by any of his more worldly associates. Its most direct antecedent in comics is probably Crockett Johnson's Barnaby, where parents repeatedly interact with their son's supernatural friend even while denying the possibility of that being's existence." Drake wrote the revival of the Quality Comics character Plastic Man in 1966. He wrote several stories for The Adventures of Jerry Lewis including issue #101 (July–Aug. 1967) which featured artist Neal Adams' first full-length story for DC.

With artist Carmine Infantino, Drake had co-created Deadman, a murdered circus trapeze artist whose ghost traverses the country seeking the unknown man who killed him. Deadman's first appearance in Strange Adventures #205 included the first known depiction of narcotics in a story approved by the Comics Code Authority. Drake additionally scripted the following issue's story, miscredited in several reprints as written by Jack Miller. The character would become a mainstay of the DC Universe well into the 2000s.

Other work for DC during this time included stories of the adventuring quartet the Challengers of the Unknown.

Letterer Clem Robins, who worked with him, wrote that Drake

...had it all: economy, pacing, a sure ear for dialogue, humor, and the ability to invent characters you believed in and cared about. ... [In his] long run on DC's Jerry Lewis book, ... he got to demonstrate his macabre sense of humor. There was one issue (#95) that parodied the [P.O.W. prison-break movie] The Great Escape, in which a summer camp's inmates attempt to bust out from under the watchful eye of the head counselor, Uncle Hal, who dressed in a Gestapo uniform and whose sexuality was extremely questionable. It was all pretty risqué for 1966, but it was almost unbelievably funny.

=== Later comics work ===
In the late 1960s, Drake freelanced for Marvel Comics, beginning with Captain Savage #5 (Aug. 1968), starring a World War II Marines squadron; he would additionally script some later issues of that series, plus a single issue of the WWII series Sgt. Fury and his Howling Commandos. Drake wrote the run of X-Men #47–54 (Aug. 1968 – March 1969, co-writing his initial issue with Gary Friedrich), which included two rare circumstances of stories drawn but not written by the noted comics writer-artist Jim Steranko. Drake introduced several new characters to the series, including Mesmero, Lorna Dane, and Havok. Drake as well wrote issues of the space-alien superhero Captain Marvel, stories for the superhero satire comic Not Brand Echh, and a story of the jungle lord Ka-Zar. In Marvel Super-Heroes #18 (Jan. 1969), Drake and editor Stan Lee co-created the Guardians of the Galaxy, a far-future team of freedom fighters gathered from different planets of the Solar System. The characters would star in a 62-issue series in the 1990s, and inspire a new team of that name in the 2000s.

By mid-1969, however, Drake had left Marvel. His next new comics work to be published was a supernatural anthology story in Gold Key Comics' Grimm's Ghost Stories #1 (Jan. 1972) – the first of many stories for that company, including for the series Boris Karloff Tales of Mystery, and the licensed TV-series titles Dark Shadows, Star Trek, and Twilight Zone, among others. His Gold Key work included what comics historian Mark Evanier called "a particularly long and delightful stint on Little Lulu", beginning with issue #232 (May 1976). In 1973, Drake began freelancing again for DC occasionally, writing stories for series as varied as Weird War Tales and Supergirl. Beginning in 1977, Drake contributed stories to several issues of Charlton Comics' black-and-white satirical-humor magazine, Sick.

Drake contributed to all four issues of Starstream, a 68-page anthology series with cardboard covers that adapted classic science-fiction stories. There he would also use the pen names H. E. Arloff, Pamela Eckard and H. Dawes. That series was published by Whitman Comics, the rights-holder to several properties it licensed to Gold Key, and Drake would continue with Whitman when it began distributing Little Lulu and its other properties itself in 1980. By 1981, Drake was executive director of the Veteran's Bedside Network, an organization through which actors, actresses, and sound engineers would perform scripted material to entertain patients in Veterans Administration hospitals in the New York City area.

Drake's last known original comics story for nearly 20 years was the six-page "G.I. Samurai" in DC's G.I. Combat #276 (April 1985). He resurfaced two decades later with the 12-page "Tripping Out!", illustrated by Luis Dominguez, in the mature-audience comics magazine Heavy Metal vol. 26, #6 (Jan. 2003). This story was accompanied by a one-page biography of the two creators.

Drake wrote the foreword, introduction, preface and afterword of DC's 2002 hardcover reprint collection The Doom Patrol Archives #1. He was also working on a new Doom Patrol graphic novel, a prequel story, at the time of his death. He also wrote a five-page afterword, "The Graphic Novel – And How It Grew", in Dark Horse Books' March 2007 reprint of his and collaborators Leslie Waller and Matt Baker's pioneering, 1950 proto-graphic novel It Rhymes with Lust.

=== Death ===
Drake collapsed days after having attended the February 23–25, 2007 New York Comic Book Convention, where he had had, organizers said, "a touch of pneumonia". Admitted to New York City's Cabrini Medical Center, he died of pneumonia and septic shock.

== Awards ==
Drake received several awards for his comics work, including the 1967 Alley Award for Best Full-Length Story ("Who's Been Lying in My Grave?" in Strange Adventures #205 with Carmine Infantino), the 1967 Alley Award for Best New Strip ("Deadman" with Carmine Infantino in Strange Adventures), and a 1999 Inkpot Award.

In 2005, Drake received the first annual Bill Finger Award for Excellence in Comics Writing. In 2008, he was posthumously inducted into the Will Eisner Comic Book Hall of Fame.

== Non-comics work ==
Drake wrote the screenplay for the 1964 horror film The Flesh Eaters, which he produced. He wrote the screenplay for Who Killed Teddy Bear, a 1965 release starring Sal Mineo and Juliet Prowse, as well as the title song for the 1970 film Ils sont nus (translated into English under the titles 'We Are All Naked' and 'Days of Desire').

Drake wrote lyrics for musicals, co-writing the book for G&S: or, The Oils of Araby (1980), with his brother, songwriter-composer Ervin Drake.

== Bibliography ==
=== DC Comics ===
- Adventure Comics #430 (1973)
- The Adventures of Bob Hope #88, 90–103, 105–109 (1964–1968)
- The Adventures of Jerry Lewis #83–98, 100–105, 115 (1964–1969)
- Batman #103, 105, 117, 124, 132, 154 (1956–1963)
- Blackhawk #196–198, 213 (1964–1965)
- Challengers of the Unknown #27, 29, 32, 38, 40, 45, 48, 55–63 (1962–1968)
- DC Special Series #12 (Secrets of Haunted House Special); #22 (G.I. Combat Special) (1978–1980)
- Doom Patrol #86–121 (1964–1968)
- The Fox and the Crow #96–98, 100–102, 106–108 (Stanley and His Monster) (1966–1968)
- Ghosts #108 (1982)
- G.I. Combat #228, 232–233, 239, 248, 255, 257, 264, 271, 273, 276 (1981–1985)
- Hawkman #24 (1968)
- House of Mystery #51–52, 247, 252, 254, 257, 261, 281 (1956–1980)
- House of Secrets #107, 115, 154 (1973–1978)
- The Many Loves of Dobie Gillis #25–26 (1964)
- My Greatest Adventure #80–85 (Doom Patrol) (1963–1964)
- Mystery in Space #115–116 (1981)
- Phantom Stranger vol. 2 #27–34, 37 (1973–1975)
- Plastic Man #1–10 (1966–1968)
- Plop! #19 (1976)
- Sea Devils #17 (1964)
- Secrets of Haunted House #5, 9, 31, 35, 39 (1975–1981)
- Showcase #1 (Fireman Farrell); #41–42, 44, 46–47 (Tommy Tomorrow) (1956–1963)
- Stanley and His Monster #109–110, 112 (1968)
- Star Spangled War Stories #193, 198 (1975–1976)
- Strange Adventures #205–206 (Deadman) (1967)
- Superboy #168 (1970)
- Supergirl #5–6 (1973)
- Superman's Girl Friend, Lois Lane #133 (1973)
- Tales of the Unexpected #40–71, 73–77 (Space Ranger) (1959–1963)
- Time Warp #3–5 (1980)
- The Unexpected #206, 209, 211–212, 217, 220, 222 (1981–1982)
- Weird War Tales #12–13, 15–16, 18–20, 22, 31, 36–37, 55–57, 69 (1973–1978)
- Weird Western Tales #20 (Jonah Hex) (1973)
- World's Finest Comics #102 (Tommy Tomorrow) (1959)

=== Marvel Comics ===
- Captain Savage and his Leatherneck Raiders #5, 13–16 (1968–1969)
- Captain Marvel #5–12 (1968–1969)
- Marvel Super-Heroes #18 (Guardians of the Galaxy), #19 (Ka-Zar) (1969)
- Not Brand Echh #11–13 (1968–1969)
- Sgt. Fury and his Howling Commandos #58 (1968)
- X-Men #47–54 (1968–1969)

Preceded by n/a	Doom Patrol writer 1963–1968	Succeeded by Paul Kupperberg (in 1977)
Preceded by Gary Friedrich	(Uncanny) X-Men writer 1968–1969	Succeeded by Roy Thomas
