= Leslie Waller =

American novelist

Leslie Elson Waller
- Born: Leslie E. Waller; April 1, 1923; Chicago
- Died: March 29, 2007 (aged 83); Rochester, NY
- Education: University of Chicago
- Occupations: Fiction writer, PR executive
- Spouse(s): Louise Hetzel; Patricia Mahen
- Writing career
- Period: 1944–2001
- Notable works: The Banker (1963); The Family (1968); The American (1971)

Leslie Elson Waller (April 1, 1923 – March 29, 2007) was an American writer.

== Biography ==
He is a son of Ukrainian immigrants and was born in Chicago, Illinois. He suffered from amblyopia and poliomyelitis as a child, but graduated from Hyde Park High School by the age of 16. He was interested in writing from an early age, and became a police reporter before he went to Wilson Junior College.

He joined the Army Air Corps in 1942 and continued to write, never leaving the US. His first published novel under his own name was Three Day Pass. Before that, he published Lie Like a Lady under the pseudonym C.S. Cody.

After World War II, he attended the University of Chicago and earned his M.A. from Columbia University. He married Louise Hetzel. Together, they moved to New York City, where his second novel, Phoenix Island, was published in 1953. The couple had two daughters, Elizabeth and Susan, and divorced in 1968. After the divorce, he married photographer and actress Patricia Mahen, and they moved to Calabria, Italy, in 1978 where they lived for 11 years and later moved to London. After 15 years abroad, they lived in Naples, Florida where he wrote, lectured, and contributed to Florida's leading cultural magazine, the Naples Review.

Waller worked as a public relations account executive at Harshe-Rotman and Druck in New York, servicing a variety of accounts, including Hertz Rent-a-Car. In the meantime, he continued to write novels and a children's book series, "A Book to Begin on...".

== Writer ==
Leslie Waller with his co-author Arnold Drake are credited with having written the first graphic novel, It Rhymes with Lust. It was their idea to pitch a new idea, the "picture novel", a bridge between comic books and "book books", to St John, the publisher who released It Rhymes with Lust. Originally published in 1950, the graphic novel was rereleased by Dark Horse Comics in the Spring of 2007.

His trilogy, The Banker, The Family, and The American garnered recognition, landing the last title on The New York Times bestseller list. Waller became known as a go-to man for novelizations and produced the novels for Dog Day Afternoon (under the pseudonym Patrick Mann), Close Encounters of the Third Kind (ghost-written) and Hide in Plain Sight.

== Bibliography ==
- Lie Like a Lady (writing as C S Cody)
- Three Day Pass (1944)
- Show Me the Way (1947)
- It Rhymes with Lust (1950) (with Arnold Drake, writing as Drake Waller)
- The Bed She Made (1951)
- The Witching Night (1953) (writing as C S Cody)
- Phoenix Island (1958)
- The Banker (1963)
- Will the Real Toulouse-Lautrec Please Stand Up? (1965)
- Overdrive (1966)
- New Sound (1968)
- The Family (1968)
- Change in the Wind (1970)
- The American (1971)
- Number One (1973)
- The Vacancy (1973) (writing as Patrick Mann)
- Dog Day Afternoon (1974) (writing as Patrick Mann)
- Coast of Fear (1975)
- The Swiss Account (1976)
- K. Assignment (1976)
- Close Encounters of the Third Kind (1977) (with Steven Spielberg)
- Hide in Plain Sight (1978)
- Trocadero (1978)
- Brave and the Free (1979)
- Blood and Dreams (1980)
- Steal Big (1981) (writing as Patrick Mann)
- Gameplan (1983)
- Falcon Crest (1984) (writing as Patrick Mann)
- Embassy (1987)
- Amazing Faith (1988)
- Mafia Wars (1991)
- Deadly Sins (1992)
- Tango Havana (1993)
- Manhattan Transfer (1994)
- Eden (1997)
- Comeback (1997)
- Target Diana (2001)
