= List of science fiction television programs, J =

This is an inclusive list of science fiction television programs whose names begin with the letter J.

== J ==
Live-action

- Jack of All Trades (2000)
- Jake 2.0 (2003–2004)
- Jason of Star Command (1978–1979, Tarzan and the Super 7 segment)
- Jekyll (2007, UK)
- Jensen Project, The (2010, film)
- Jeopardy (2002–2004, Scotland/Australia)
- Jeremiah (2002–2004)
- Jericho (2006–2008)
- Joe 90 (1968–1969, UK, puppetry)
- John Doe (2002)
- Johnny Jupiter (1953)
- Journey of Allen Strange, The (1997–2000)
- Journey to the Center of the Earth (franchise):
  - Journey to the Center of the Earth (1989, film)
  - Journey to the Center of the Earth (1993, film) IMDb
  - Journey to the Center of the Earth (1999, miniseries) IMDb
  - Journey to the Center of the Earth (2008, film)
- Journeyman (2007)
- Jupiter Moon (1990, UK)
- Justice League of America (1997, pilot, film)

Animated

- J9 (franchise):
  - Braiger (1981–1982, Japan, animated)
  - Baxingar (1982–1983, Japan, animated)
  - Sasuraiger (1983–1984, Japan, animated)
- Jayce and the Wheeled Warriors (1985, France/Canada/Japan, animated)
- Jetsons, The (1962–1963, 1985–1987, animated)
- Jetter Mars (1977, Japan, animated)
- Jimmy Two-Shoes (2009–2011, Canada/UK/US, animated)
- Jing: King of Bandits (2002, Japan, animated)
- Johnny Test (2005–2014, animated)
- Jonny Quest (franchise):
  - Real Adventures of Jonny Quest, The (1996–1999, animated)
  - Jonny Quest vs. The Cyber Insects (1995, animated, film, New Adventures of Jonny Quest, The sequel)
  - Jonny's Golden Quest (1993, animated, film, New Adventures of Jonny Quest, The sequel)
  - New Adventures of Jonny Quest, The (1986–1987, animated, Jonny Quest sequel)
  - Jonny Quest (1964–1965, animated)
- Josie and the Pussycats in Outer Space (1972, animated)
- Journey to the Center of the Earth (franchise):
  - Journey to the Center of the Earth (1967, animated)
  - A Journey to the Center of the Earth (1977, Australia, animated) IMDb
  - Journey to the Center of the Earth (1996, Canada, animated) IMDb
  - Journey to the Center of the Earth (2001, France, animated) IMDb
- Jurassic Park (franchise):
  - Jurassic World Camp Cretaceous (2020-2022, animated)
  - Jurassic World: Chaos Theory (2024-present, animated)
- Jushin Liger (1989–1990, Japan, animated)
- Justice League (franchise):
  - Justice League (2001–2004, animated)
  - Justice League Unlimited (2004–2006, animated)
  - Young Justice (2010–2013, animated)
  - Justice League Action (2016–2018, animated)
- Jyu-Oh-Sei (2006, Japan, animated)
