= Jonny Quest (disambiguation) =

Jonny Quest is a media franchise that revolves around a boy named Jonny Quest who accompanies his father on extraordinary adventures.

Jonny Quest may also refer to:

- Jonny Quest: Cover-Up at Roswell, a computer game
- Jonny Quest (TV series), a 1964–1965 American television series
- The New Adventures of Jonny Quest
- The Real Adventures of Jonny Quest
