= Jonny Quest =

American media franchise

- Created by: Doug Wildey
- Original work: Jonny Quest (1964–1965)
- Owners: Warner Bros. Entertainment (Skydance)

Print publications
- Comics: 1 ongoing, several one-shots and limited series

Films and television
- Television series: Jonny Quest (1964–1965); The New Adventures of Jonny Quest (1986–1987); The Real Adventures of Jonny Quest (1996–1997)
- Television films: Jonny's Golden Quest (1992); Jonny Quest versus The Cyber Insects (1995)
- Direct-to-video: Tom and Jerry: Spy Quest (Tom and Jerry crossover, 2015)

Games
- Video games: Jonny Quest in Doctor Zin's Underworld (1991); Jonny Quest: Curse of the Mayan Warriors (1993); Jonny Quest: Cover-Up at Roswell (1996)

Jonny Quest is an American science fiction–adventure media franchise created by cartoonist and comic book artist Doug Wildey for Hanna-Barbera. It follows the character Jonny Quest, a young boy who joins his scientist father on various extraordinary adventures. The franchise started with a 1964–65 television series of the same name, and has come to include two sequel television series, two television films and three video games. It is currently owned by Warner Bros. after Hanna-Barbera was absorbed by Warner Bros. Animation and succeeded by Cartoon Network Studios.

== Original series (1964–65) ==
Jonny Quest, also known as The Adventures of Jonny Quest, is the original American science fiction/adventure animated television series that started the franchise. It was produced by Hanna-Barbera for Screen Gems, and was created and designed by Wildey. Inspired by radio serials and comics in the action-adventure genre, including Doc Savage, Tom Swift, The Adventures of Tintin and Jack Armstrong, the All-American Boy, the series featured more realistic art, characters, and stories than Hanna-Barbera's previous cartoon programs. This show closely parallels the juvenile Rick Brant series. It was the first of several Hanna-Barbera action-based adventure shows, which would later include Space Ghost, The Herculoids, and Birdman and the Galaxy Trio, and ran on ABC in primetime on early Friday nights for one season from 1964 to 1965.

Hanna-Barbera released an LP titled Jonny Quest in 20,000 Leagues Under the Sea in 1965. It is a 29-minute radioplay with Dr. Quest, Race Bannon and Jonny, in a Jules Verne-inspired sea adventure.

After two decades in reruns, during which it appeared on all three major United States television networks of the time, new episodes were produced for syndication in 1986. Subsequently, telefilms, a comic-book series, and a modernized revival series, The Real Adventures of Jonny Quest, were produced in the 1990s.

== The New Adventures of Jonny Quest ==
Thirteen episodes were produced in 1986 (some sources state 1987) to accompany the originals in the Funtastic World programming block. These episodes were referred to simply as Jonny Quest in their opening title sequence, and were noticeably less violent and more "kid-friendly" than the 1960s originals, and introduced the new regular character Hardrock, (also called the Monolith Man), a living being made of stone. Hardrock would not return in any later versions of the program.

Jonny's Golden Quest, a feature-length television movie was produced by Hanna-Barbera for USA Network in 1993, again pitting the Quest team against Dr. Zin, who in the film murders Jonny's mother. Jonny's Golden Quest reused the storyline of the recent series' episode "Deadly Junket", in which a little girl named Jessie Bradshaw, the daughter of a missing scientist, asked the Quest party to help find her father. Here she is revealed to be lying about her parentage at Dr. Zin's behest, and to Race's surprise is actually his and Jade's daughter. Jessie would appear as a character in all subsequent versions of the Jonny Quest property. A second telefilm, Jonny Quest versus The Cyber Insects, was produced for TNT in 1995, and was promoted as being the final iteration of the "Classic Jonny Quest".

All three of these productions featured the voices of Don Messick and Granville Van Dusen as Dr. Quest and Race Bannon, respectively. Messick also reprised performing the "voice" of Bandit in the series, but the features had this done by Frank Welker.

== The Real Adventures of Jonny Quest ==
The Real Adventures of Jonny Quest premiered on all three major Turner Broadcasting System entertainment cable channels (Cartoon Network, TBS, and TNT). This Quest redux returned in the late 1990s on Cartoon Network, as part of the original Toonami rotation when the block launched on March 17, 1997, and aired consistently on Toonami until September 24, 1999. It then continued to air sporadically until December 14, 2002. Almost seven years later (February 17, 2009), the first thirteen episodes of "season one" became available on DVD. Characters Jonny, Hadji, and Jessie are now older teenagers, and Dr. Quest's compound has moved from TK to a rocky island off the coast of Maine.

Rumors of a problem-laden production surrounded this series since 1992. When finally broadcast, it featured two different versions of its own Quest-ian universe: the first batch of episodes (referred to as the "season one" episodes) gave the team a futuristic look; while the second batch (referred to as "season two") harkened to original episodes from the 1960s. Several "season one" — and a few "season two" — adventures in this series took place in a cyberspace realm known as "Questworld", depicted using 3-D computer animation. Both "seasons" aired during the same 1996–1997 television season. The show was canceled after 52 episodes (26 of each season), and plans for a live-action movie (to debut following the series premiere) never materialized.

Dr. Zin never appeared or was mentioned in Season 1, the series instead focusing on new recurring villains Jeremiah Surd and Ezekiel Rage mostly. However, the creators felt this series failed to capture enough of the spirit of the original, so they brought Zin back (second-season, episode "Nemesis"), revealing himself very much alive to Quest, as he holds a NASA station hostage amid the launching of a new satellite.

== Other media ==
=== Feature film ===
In an interview in the first issue of the Comico: The Comic Company published Jonny Quest Comic book, Joseph Barbera stated since 1984 they had received offers from six different companies interested in licensing Jonny Quest for either a live action prime time television series or feature film.

In the late 80s following his work on The Gate, Michael Nankin was hired to write a script for a big budget adaptation of Jonny Quest. In October 1987, it was reported that Fred Dekker would be writing and directing the Jonny Quest movie for Taft/Barish Productions and TriStar Pictures. Dekker planned to add some edge to the characters such as Dr. Benton Quest struggling with alcoholism due to the death of his wife and making Race Bannon a mixture of James Bond and Martin Riggs. Dekker stated he wanted to evoke the Sean Connery-era Bond films in terms of style and tone and planned to approach production designer Ken Adam of the Bond movies to achieve that.

In the early 1990s, Turner planned a "Year of Jonny Quest" marketing campaign to feature a new television series, the release of classic episodes on VHS, the creation of two new animated movies in classic continuity (Jonny's Golden Quest and Jonny Quest versus The Cyber Insects), and the production of a live-action film. Director Richard Donner, producer Lauren Shuler Donner, and Jane Rosenthal optioned the rights for the live action film, having expressed interest in the property soon after Turner's acquisition of Hanna-Barbera. Slated to begin production in mid-1995 with a screenplay written by Fred Dekker, and a screen test trailer video was made as an audition for improving the interest but filming was pushed back to 1996 and ultimately never began. By early 1996, the project had already fallen well-behind development of other films, such as a live-action Jetsons movie.

Zac Efron and Dwayne "the Rock" Johnson were reported in 2009 to have been cast as Jonny Quest and Race Bannon in an upcoming live action movie, respectively, according to a Moviehole.com interview with Johnson.

In May 2015, it was announced that Robert Rodriguez would direct a live-action version from a script co-written by Rodriguez and Terry Rossio. Adrian Askarieh has stated to IGN that the film will be Indiana Jones meets James Bond with a PG rating.

In July 2016, Forbes reported that the film would start a franchise with the script written by Rodriguez and Rossio and with either Joe Cornish, Justin Lin or Scott Derrickson as director. The film will position Jonny as a "Harry Potter inside an Indiana Jones movie" and specifically set up the potential for spinoffs. The script also took inspiration from a few specific stories and elements in the original 1960s TV show. The site reported that the studio was considering actors Idris Elba, Bradley Cooper and Will Smith for the role of Race Bannon.

In November 2018, Warner Bros. announced that the movie would be directed by Chris McKay. In 2021, McKay said that a script for the film has been turned in, but the studio has yet to given the film the greenlight.

=== Comic books ===
A Jonny Quest comic book (a retelling of the first TV episode, "Mystery of the Lizard Men") was published by Gold Key Comics in 1964. Huckleberry Hound Weekly included original Jonny Quest stories from 1965-1967.

Comico began publication of a Jonny Quest series in 1986, with the first issue featuring Doug Wildey's artwork. The series was written by William Messner-Loebs and ran for 31 issues, with 2 specials and 3 "classic" issues drawn by Wildey retelling Quest TV episodes ("Shadow of the Condor", "Calcutta Adventure", and "Werewolf of the Timberland"). Wildey drew several additional covers, as did Steve Rude and Dave Stevens. The series also spun off a 3-issue series named Jezebel Jade – drawn by Adam Kubert – which told the story of Jade's relationship and adventures with Race Bannon.

Jonny and the gang (including Dr. Zin) returned to comic book form in May 2015 when they joined the Mystery Machine gang in DC Comics' 10th newsstand edition of Scooby-Doo Team-Up.

In 2016, DC comics announced Future Quest, a series featuring Jonny Quest and a variety of other Hanna-Barbera characters. Jonny Quest has a crossover with Adam Strange in Adam Strange/Future Quest Annual #1 on March 29, 2017.

On October 13, 2023, it was announced a new Jonny Quest comic from Dynamite Entertainment is in the works. The series released its preview issue on May 4, 2024 for Free Comic Book Day, and it ran for five issues from August 14, 2024 to December 18, 2024. The series received generally positive reviews with an average critic score of 8.8/10 according to Comic Book Round Up. A sequel series, Space Ghost / Jonny Quest: Space Quest, crosses over with Space Ghost and began release on May 7, 2025. It is also receiving generally positive reviews with an average critic score of 8.3/10 as of August 2025.

=== Computer games ===
In 1991, Hi-Tec Software published Jonny Quest in Doctor Zin's Underworld, a licensed Jonny Quest platform game for the ZX Spectrum, Amstrad CPC, and Commodore 64 home computers.

In 1993, Hollyware Entertainment published Jonny Quest: Curse of the Mayan Warriors, a licensed DOS title available only on 3.5" floppy disk. The pre-release title was Jonny Quest and the Splinter of Heaven.

In 1996, Virgin Interactive published Jonny Quest: Cover-Up at Roswell for Windows 3.1 and Windows 95.

=== Reception ===
In January 2009, IGN named Jonny Quest as the 77th best in its "Top 100 Animated TV Shows".

=== Music ===
Powerglove covered the theme song to The Real Adventures of Jonny Quest on their album Saturday Morning Apocalypse.

The Reverend Horton Heat performed a version of the Jonny Quest theme music (paired with the tune "Stop That Pigeon") on Saturday Morning: Cartoons' Greatest Hits, which is a tribute album of songs from Saturday morning children's television shows and cartoons (mostly) from the 1960s and 1970s, released in 1995 by MCA.

The music group "The Swingtips" recorded a version of the original Jonny Quest series theme for their 2007 album Roswell.

=== Direct-to-video film ===
On June 23, 2015, characters from Jonny Quest starred in a crossover animated direct-to-video film with Tom and Jerry entitled Tom and Jerry: Spy Quest.

=== Fanzines ===
The fanzine Jonny Quest Adventurezine was published in 1979 by Cornell Kimball.

== Parodies and homages ==
The characters and setting of Jonny Quest have frequently been the subject of brief parodies, especially in later animated programs, some of which have aired on Cartoon Network's Adult Swim late-night programming block. WarnerMedia owns both Cartoon Network and the rights to the entire Hanna-Barbera library, including Jonny Quest. In addition, there have been several substantial references to the show:

- Dr. Benton Quest appears in a cameo role during the end-credit sequence of Scoob!
- In The Fairly OddParents TV movie "Channel Chasers", Jonny Quest is parodied as Jonny Hunt.
- The cast from Quest can be seen on several episodes of Scooby-Doo: Mystery Incorporated. There are several episodes that bring in several characters such as Race and Dr. Quest, also making use of some Quest settings.
- Adult Swim's The Venture Bros. features characters who are satirical analogues of the Jonny Quest cast: Dr. Thaddeus "Rusty" Venture, his bodyguard Brock Samson, and his sons Hank and Dean. Flashbacks reveal that Rusty is himself the son of a Benton Quest analog, now coasting on the fame of his late father. During the first season, the creators of the show realized that Cartoon Network's parent owned Jonny Quest and began using the actual characters, including Jonny as a paranoid drug addict severely damaged by the constant danger his father put him in, Race Bannon as a government intelligence operative, and Hadji as a hard-working competent engineer for Rusty's successful brother Jonas Jr. Starting with the third season, the Jonny Quest characters were renamed: Jonny was renamed "Action Johnny", Race Bannon was referred to as "Red" and Dr. Zin was called "Dr. Z". There was no in-show explanation for the change.
- Adult Swim's Harvey Birdman, Attorney at Law features the cast in several bizarre parody episodes. In "Bannon Custody Battle", Bannon and Dr. Quest fight for custody of Jonny and Hadji, and in "Return of Birdgirl", Bannon and Dr. Quest apply for a same-sex marriage. Other episodes featured the Lizard Men from "Mystery of the Lizard Men", the mummy from "Curse of Anubis", a yeti from "Monsters in the Monastery", a gargoyle from "The House of the Seven Gargoyles", the robotic spider from "The Robot Spy", and others.
- Jonny Quest, Hadji, and Dr. Benton Quest appeared in Stewie Griffin: The Untold Story, a Family Guy direct-to-video movie.
- An eight-minute parody appeared in 1995 on the animated series Freakazoid, under the title "Toby Danger", featuring the voices of Scott Menville, Don Messick (in his last role before he died), and Granville Van Dusen (all of whom provided voices for the original series). It was written by Tom Minton as a twelve-minute stand-alone short for Animaniacs, but edited by director Eric Radomski to fit into the available Freakazoid! time slot.
- Jonny Quest appears in the background in a South Park made-for-TV movie called "Imaginationland".
- Matt Fraction's spy-fi comic book series Casanova features a genius villain going by the name of Sabine Seychelle, who works with a large Indian bodyguard named Samir. Fraction describes his inspiration in the text column at the end of Casanova No. 4: "I liked the idea of Jonny Quest, all adult and crooked. The son of an adventure scientist and his bePolo'd sidekick would grow up...how, exactly? Bent, I supposed. Weeeird. The kind of guy that would create phenomenal machines...and then sleep with them three at a time".
- In the Less Than Jake song "Johnny Quest Thinks We're Sellouts", Johnny Quest is the name of a disgruntled fan accusing the band of selling out to corporations, which would jeopardize their ska influence and result in their records and concert ticket prices increasing. The idea for the song came from a friend of member Chris DeMakes who went by the nickname "Johnny Quest" frivolously writing down "Less Than Jake are sellouts" in his office.
- Brazilian pop rock band Jota Quest is named after the series. Originally, they performed under the name J. Quest, but to avoid legal conflict with Hanna-Barbera, the J. was expanded to Jota (the Portuguese name for the letter J) from their second album onward.
- The Indianapolis-based punk band Racebannon takes its name from the Jonny Quest character.
- Clips from the show are also shown on the television the Parrs watch in the 2018 film Incredibles 2.
