= Jonny's Golden Quest =

1993 television film directed by Don Lusk

- Home video release cover art
- Based on: Jonny Quest characters created by Doug Wildey
- Screenplay by: Sean Roche
- Story by: Mark Young
- Directed by: Don Lusk; Paul Sommer
- Voices of: Don Messick; Granville Van Dusen; Meredith MacRae; JoBeth Williams; Frank Welker; Anndi McAfee; Rob Paulsen; Jeffrey Tambor; Will Estes; B.J. Ward
- Composer: John Debney
- Countries of origin: United States; Philippines
- Original language: English

Production
- Executive producers: William Hanna; Joseph Barbera
- Producer: Mario Piluso
- Running time: 87 minutes
- Production companies: H-B Production Co. Fil-Cartoons

Original release
- Network: USA Network
- Release: April 4, 1993

Jonny's Golden Quest is an animated made-for-television film produced by Hanna-Barbera in 1992, and originally aired on USA Network on April 4, 1993. It is a follow-up to the 1964–65 Jonny Quest cartoon series, and its 1986 revival The New Adventures of Jonny Quest from The Funtastic World of Hanna-Barbera. Jonny's Golden Quest reunites the voice talents of Don Messick as Dr. Benton Quest, Granville Van Dusen as Race Bannon, and Rob Paulsen as Hadji from the 1986 series. The film also features Will Nipper as Jonny Quest, JoBeth Williams as Jade Kenyon, Anndi McAfee as Jessie, and Jeffrey Tambor as Dr. Zin. It is set after and references the continuity of the previous two Jonny Quest series.

== Plot ==
Team Quest, working as associates for international spy operation Intelligence-One, are given an assignment to investigate occurrences of mutated animals and plant life in Peru. Dr. Benton Quest and his bodyguard "Race" Bannon bring along Benton's sons Jonny and (adopted from India) Hadji, and their dog Bandit. Also coming along is Benton's biologist wife Dr. Rachel Quest, who usually does not come along on their adventures.

Upon arriving in Peru, Race runs into his ex-wife Jade Kenyon, who was sent by Intelligence-One as their civilian contact for the investigation. Just after Jade's arrival, Benton and Rachel are kidnapped by Dr. Zin, who has caused the mutations while perfecting processes to bring monsters called "replicants" to life. Zin has also been working on cloning technology, and manages to successfully clone himself before Race, Jonny, and Hadji arrive to save Benton and Rachel. However, Rachel is taken hostage by Zin's clone and, after Benton freezes while attempting to shoot down Zin in his hovercraft (as he would have shot Rachel as well), both Rachel and Zin's clone are killed in the erupting volcano.

Rachel's murder causes Benton to quit I-1, and drives a wedge into his already strained relationship with Jonny. As he begins shutting down the Quest compound in Mexico, an American girl named Jessie turns up with a mask made of synthetically pure gold, which she tells Team Quest she was to deliver to an associate of her alchemist father, Dr. Victor Devlon. When approached by Intelligence-One to discover the whereabouts of Dr. Devlon and the secrets to his alchemy process, Benton reluctantly accepts.

Team Quest and Jessie begin a globe-trotting search for Jessie's father and his associates, pursued at every turn by Dr. Zin and his operatives, one of whom is revealed to be a reluctant Jade. Dr. Quest uses a sentient supercomputer, 3-DAC, to help him, the rest of his team, and Jessie follow the trail of Devlon from Tokyo, to Paris, and then to Rome. During the trip, Jonny and Jessie begin to grow fond of one another, while Jonny's relationship with his father continues to deteriorate. Convinced Benton could have taken the shot and saved Rachel, Jonny continues to treat Race more like a father then Benton as he considers Benton a weakling.

Jonny swears to kill Zin in revenge, avenge his mother's death, and show up his father. After initially trying to lean Races flying dragon kick, which proves far beyond his current ability, despite his brown belt level in karate, After Race tells him the move will take him months or years to perfect, Jonny opts to go the marksmanship route and asks Race when he can start carrying a weapon, which Race discourages him from doing so as well as marital arts training, for a 3rd degree black belt, as there are better things.

Later that night, after a quick coffee break at the cafe, Team Quest and Jessie enter the catacombs of Rome, where Devlon is hiding out in a makeshift lab. It is revealed Devlon was an employee of Zin's who ran away with an alchemy formula he'd helped invent, as 100% pure gold was the key ingredient to improving his cloning process. However, Devlon got greedy which is the reason he stole the formula for himself. Everything Jessie had told Team Quest about her father and the mask were lies to have them help Zin find Devlon, as Zin had kidnapped Jessie's mother - Jade - and forced them to play parts in his schemes.

Dr. Zin kills Devlon and kidnaps Race with a tentacled robot, taking him to a compound in the Australian Outback to use Race's DNA to improve the vitality of Zin's own clones. When Zin's intelligent replicant bodyguard Snipe prepares to execute the rest of the group himself, Hadji attempts to hypnotize him into letting them go, but Snipe is unaffected by hypnosis, so Hadji brings the mummies to life. They attack and kill Snipe, allowing Team Quest, Jessie and Jade to get away. Jade later reveals to Jessie that Race is her father.

The group arrive at the Australian compound to save Race and destroy Zin's robot along with the remaining replicants, but when Zin captures Benton and Jonny is faced with the same dilemma of whether or not he can take a shot at Zin while he is holding Benton hostage, Jonny freezes as well. However, he is able to use a dolphin communicator his mother had given him to get a pair of dolphins to bump Zin away from his father. Jonny tried to fire at Zin; however, Zin escapes to a getaway submarine and sends a missile to destroy the compound. This plan backfires when Zin's sub ends up trapped beneath falling debris, and he is left to die. As the plant begins to explode, a repican jumps out in front of jonny, to save him, jessie uses Races flying dragon kick to knock it out. Jonny is impressed but there is not time to take it all in as the pant contiues to fall apart.

As the group near the exit, Jonny is separated from the rest of Team Quest in their escape by falling dbrie, but his dolphin friends lead him safely out of the compound underwater.

Jonny and Benton reconcile, Jonny realizes that what happened to his mother wasn't Benton's fault, and Benton makes a full-fledged return to Intelligence-One work. Race, who now knows Jessie is his daughter, joins Jessie and Jade on a sea cruise vacation - but not before Jessie gives Jonny a goodbye kiss. As the Bannon-Kenyon family sets sail, one of Dr. Zin's clones is revealed to be floating in the ocean waters in a tube, having survived the explosion of the Australian compound.

== Relation to previous works ==
The main plot of Jonny's Golden Quest repurposes the storyline of "Deadly Junket," an episode of The New Adventures of Jonny Quest. In that episode, a little girl appears to ask the Quest party to help her find her missing father, a scientist kidnapped by Dr. Zin. Here, the girl, Jessie, is ultimately revealed to have been lying about her identity, and her parents are really Race and his romantic interest from two episodes of the original series, Jade.

== Voice cast ==
- Will Nipper - Jonny Quest
- Don Messick - Dr. Benton C. Quest, Bandit
- Granville Van Dusen - 'Race' Bannon
- Rob Paulsen - Hadji
- Jeffrey Tambor - Dr. Zin
- Anndi McAfee - Jessie Kenyon
- JoBeth Williams - Jade Kenyon
- Meredith MacRae - Dr. Rachel Quest
- Ed Gilbert - Commander
- George Hearn - President
- Peter Renaday - Dr. Victor Devlon
- Pepe Serna - Agent Menendez
- Marcelo Tubert - Chef
- Betty Jean Ward - 3-DAC
- Frank Welker - Snipe, Replicants
- Whitby Hertford

== Production crew ==
- Mario Piluso - Producer
- John Debney - Music
- Mark Young - Story, Co-Executive Producer
- Sean Roche - Teleplay
- William Hanna - Executive Producer
- Joseph Barbera - Executive Producer
- Don Lusk - Director
- Paul Sommer - Director

== Home media ==
On August 9, 2011, Warner Home Video released Jonny's Golden Quest on DVD in region 1 via their Warner Archive Collection. This is a manufacture-on-demand release, available exclusively through Warner's online store and only in the U.S.

The film was released on Blu-ray on September 24, 2024, as part of a double feature with Jonny Quest vs. The Cyber Insects.
