= The World Beyond =

- Also known as: The Mud Monster
- Genre: Supernatural drama
- Created by: Art Wallace
- Written by: Art Wallace
- Directed by: Noel Black
- Starring: Granville Van Dusen
- Theme music composer: Fred Karlin
- Country of origin: United States
- Original language: English
- No. of episodes: 1

Production
- Executive producer: David Susskind
- Producer: Frederick Brogger
- Production location: Canada
- Running time: 49 mins.
- Production company: Time-Life Films

Original release
- Network: CBS
- Release: January 27 – January 27, 1978

The World Beyond is the second of two pilots for an occult detective television series. The first pilot, The World of Darkness, also starring Granville Van Dusen as Paul Taylor, premiered on Sunday, April 17, 1977. The World Beyond followed as a sequel on CBS Friday, January 27, 1978.

== Premise ==
Sports writer Paul Taylor (Granville Van Dusen) died while undergoing a surgical procedure but was retrieved from the brink of death. His brush with "the world beyond" allowed the dead to communicate with him and ask him to help a living person.

== Plot ==
Taylor finds himself on a remote Maine island whose inhabitants are being menaced and killed by a golem made of mud and sticks.

== Cast ==
- Granville Van Dusen as Paul Taylor
- JoBeth Williams as Marian Faber
- Barnard Hughes as Andy Borchard
- Richard Fitzpatrick as Frank Faber
- Jan Van Evera as Sam Barker
