= Joy Garrett =

American actress and singer (1945–1993)

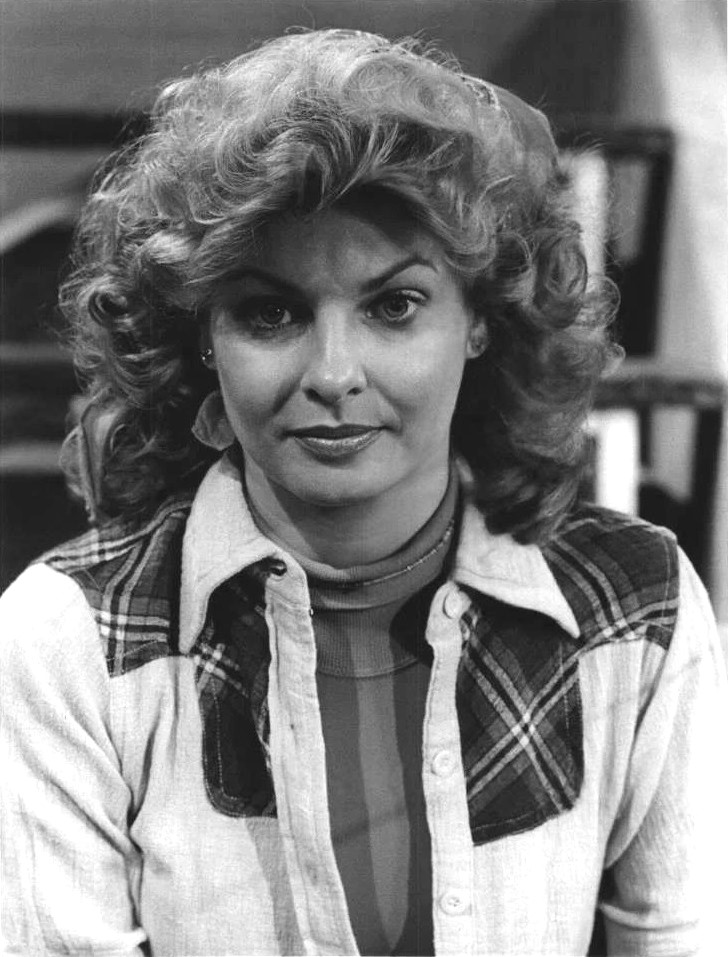
- Garrett in Ball Four (1976)
- Born: March 11, 1945; Fort Worth, Texas, U.S.
- Died: February 11, 1993 (aged 47); Los Angeles, California, U.S.
- Occupations: American singer and actor
- Years active: 1973–1993

Joyce Irene Garrett (March 2, 1945 – February 11, 1993) was an American actress and vocalist. She is best known for her role on Days of Our Lives as Jo Johnson from 1987 to 1993.

== Early years ==
Born in Fort Worth, Texas, Garrett was the daughter of Clarence and Kathleen Garrett. She was educated at Carter Riverside High School, Texas Wesleyan University and the Ameerican Academy of Dramatic Arts. In Garrett's youth she was a champion roller skater, but her interests changed with age. By the time she was in college she was taking lessons in ballet, piano, and voice in addition to her academic classes. She won the talent portion of the Miss Texas 1963 competition. In 1964 she was first runner-up in the Miss Dixie pageant in Daytona Beach, Florida.

== Career ==
In addition to her work in film and television, Garrett did some stage acting. She performed in three productions at La MaMa Experimental Theatre Club during the 1970s. These were Paul Foster's Silver Queen directed by Robert Patrick (1973), The King's Crown and I (1974), and Paul Foster's Silver Queen Saloon directed by Pat Carmichael (1978).

== Death ==
Garrett died of liver failure in UCLA Medical Center in Westwood, Los Angeles, California, at age 47 in 1993.

== Select filmography ==
- Star Trek: The Next Generation (1992)
- Murder, She Wrote (1990)
- Days of Our Lives as Jo Johnson (1987–1993)
- Love Among Thieves (1987) as Hooker
- Dynasty (1987)
- Sidekicks
- Night Court
- Magnum, P.I.
- Remington Steele
- The Young and the Restless
- Alice
- Archie Bunker's Place
- The Dukes of Hazzard as Billie Tucker
- Hotline (1982)
- Too Close for Comfort (1983)
- Born to Be Sold (1981)
- Benson (1980)
- The Incredible Hulk (1978) as Tina
- Husbands, Wives & Lovers (1978)
- Quincy M.E. (1978)
- Charlie's Angels (1978)
