= The Real Adventures of Jonny Quest =

American animated television series (1996–1997)

- Genre: Action-adventure; Drama; Sci-fi
- Based on: Jonny Quest by Doug Wildey
- Developed by: Peter Lawrence; Takashi Masunaga
- Directed by: Mike Milo; Davis Doi
- Voices of: J. D. Roth; Michael Benyaer; Jesse Douglas; George Segal; Robert Patrick; Frank Welker; Quinton Flynn; Rob Paulsen; Jennifer Hale; John de Lancie; Robert Foxworth (season 2)
- Theme music composer: Gary Lionelli (Note: Original Jonny Quest theme by William Hanna, Joseph Barbera and Hoyt Curtin)
- Composers: Christophe Beck; Guy Moon; Kevin Kiner; Thomas Chase Jones; Steve Rucker; Mark Koval; Larry H. Brown; Todd Hayen
- Country of origin: United States
- Original language: English
- No. of seasons: 2
- No. of episodes: 52

Production
- Executive producer: Sherry Gunther
- Producers: John Eng; Cos Anzilotti; David Lipman; Davis Doi; Larry Houston
- Running time: 22 minutes
- Production company: Hanna-Barbera Cartoons

Original release
- Network: Cartoon Network
- Release: August 26, 1996 – April 16, 1997

The Real Adventures of Jonny Quest (also known as Jonny Quest: The Real Adventures) is an American animated television series produced by Hanna-Barbera Cartoons and broadcast on Cartoon Network from August 26, 1996, to April 16, 1997. It is a continuation of Jonny Quest (1964) and The New Adventures of Jonny Quest (1986) and features teenage adventurers Jonny Quest, Hadji Singh, and Jessie Bannon as they accompany Dr. Benton Quest and bodyguard Race Bannon to investigate strange phenomena, legends, and mysteries in exotic locales. Action also takes place in the virtual realm of QuestWorld, a three-dimensional cyberspace domain rendered with computer animation. Conceived in the early 1990s, Real Adventures suffered a long and troubled development.

Hanna-Barbera dismissed creator Peter Lawrence in 1996 and hired new producers to finish the show. John Eng and Cosmo Anzilotti completed Lawrence's work; David Lipman, Davis Doi, and Larry Houston wrote new episodes with reworked character designs akin to those of classic Quest. Each team produced half of the show's fifty-two episodes. While Lawrence's team crafted stories of real-world mystery and exploration, later writers used science fiction and paranormal plots. Turner supported the show through a massive marketing campaign with 33 licensees. Real Adventures debuted with an unprecedented wide release on Cartoon Network, TBS, and TNT, airing 21 times per week. Critics have debated the show's animation, writing, and spirit compared to classic Quest, but it has also received praise for these same reasons.

Real Adventures failed to gain high ratings with its target demographics, and its merchandise performed poorly, leading to its cancellation after 52 episodes. Since the show ended, reruns have aired on Toonami, CNX, and other Turner networks. Turner Home Entertainment and Warner Home Video have released eight VHS tapes and two laserdiscs, and all 52 episodes are available on DVD and for digital purchase on the iTunes Store.

== Development and history ==
Hanna-Barbera created The Real Adventures of Jonny Quest in the early 1990s after being acquired by the Turner Broadcasting System. Turner planned a series of year-long "Turner-wide initiatives" to capitalize on old characters and create new media franchises. Turner received copious fan mail and phone inquiries about Quest and observed "incredibly high" marketing Q Scores. (Note: Attributed to multiple references:) The show was also Hanna-Barbera's most popular venture into the action-adventure genre; no other contemporary series featured realistic children going on lifelike adventures.

With William Hanna and Joseph Barbera's blessings, the company planned a new series, a live-action film, and two telefilms—Jonny's Golden Quest and Jonny Quest vs. The Cyber Insects. Combined with a substantial marketing campaign, the project would be their largest initiative since Turner acquired H-B. Turner Home Entertainment President Philip Kent claimed Quest would be a "consumer-products bonanza", and the company considered Real Adventures the linchpin of the Quest revival. Real Adventures, the live-action film, and the release of classic episodes on VHS would constitute a "Year of Jonny Quest" marketing blitz. The product was delayed until 1996 and echoed 1994's "Year of the Flintstones" (complimenting the feature film adaptation released in theaters that year) and 1995's "Year of Yogi Bear". Production on Real Adventures commenced in 1993. Turner hired a team led by director Dick Sebast, writer Peter Lawrence, and art director Takashi Masunaga. The firm appointed Stephanie Sperber head of the Quest task force in 1994.

Hanna-Barbera President Fred Seibert allowed Lawrence to create a new team of companions for Jonny, but Lawrence chose to bring back the original group. Sebast and Lawrence decided to make the series as realistic as possible through accurate physics and depictions of machinery. Lawrence emphasized believability, eschewing "ridiculous ... laser guns" for real sidearms. The creative team researched child psychology to ensure they could depict realistic action and consequences without fueling nightmares. Seibert touted Quest as the "Home Alone of adventure", with "high-tech, multicultural themes" that would appeal to contemporary youth. Promoters promised the new Quest would avoid "mindless violence, chauvinism, xenophobia and insensitivity", addressing historical criticisms of the classic series. Turner also claimed that Quest would appeal to either gender, stating, "Traditionally, action adventure animation may be stronger with boys, but in this case, storylines are being developed to draw girls in ... we're really hoping for a wide berth of viewership." Seibert further described the show's theme as "The X-Files for kids", citing that difficult questions and mysteries would be posed in each episode. Departures from the classic series included new character designs and the introduction of a new character to the Quest family. Takashi designed Jonny to be "edgy and handsome" and rendered characters in the style of Japanese animation to differentiate from American superhero cartoons. The team used a new character—Race's daughter, Jessie Bannon—to create conflict with Jonny. She was introduced in Jonny's Golden Quest as Race's daughter by Jezebel Jade. Lawrence initially titled the show Jonny Quest's Extraordinary Adventures, but the title changed in 1995 to its final name.

Intended for a 1995 release with 65 episodes, Real Adventures fell into development hell; roughly 30 scripts and only eight reels were in progress by March 1995. Production problems had been reported as early as January 1995; after eighteen months of production, Hanna-Barbera removed both Lawrence and Takashi in 1996, hiring John Eng and Cosmo Anzilotti to finish the first 26 episodes. Certain sequences necessitated exhaustive work and heavy revision. A new team led by David Lipman, Davis Doi, and Larry Houston finished 26 more episodes for broadcast as a separate series named The New Jonny Quest.

=== Animation ===
Peter Lawrence aimed to "go beyond cartooning and into animated film-making" for the show's storytelling. Producers contracted seven studios to animate the first season, including Pacific Animation Corporation in Japan and Toon's Factory in France. Japanese and Korean animators drew traditional cel sequences and added color; an international team handled digital post-production and QuestWorld scenes. Teva, a subsidiary of Total Group, organized a post-production team in Paris, led by Eric Jacquot, Gilles Deyries, and Pascal Legeay. Using video post-production high-end specialized tools, including Henry, Spirit, Flame, and others, the team strove to deliver a high-speed computer editing and post-production process. Most of the first season's footage was digitally inked and painted to enhance background elements. Producers applied the process in excess of 20 hours per episode, adding light effects, rain, snow, glitter, reflections, and fog.

Hanna-Barbera implemented a new computer system to combine manual animation with digital paint and to provide camera movement flexibility, which created a partial three-dimensional effect. Takashi felt the system made the creative team "honest filmmakers" through hands-on production. Lawrence described the system in 1995:

Example of digital painting for a reflective water texture in "East of Zanzibar"

We almost have a fine cut before we start animating. The pencil test is imported into the computer ... By having camera mounts on multiple levels, it enables us to review the whole show without the animation. We see the writing and see where there's a stupid line. We can re-cut the show—effectively ADR the show—and not only send the tape, but print it as well. The tape goes to the compositor and the whole thing is laid together way upfront.

— Peter Lawrence

The "pencil test [is] imported into the computer" referred to by Lawrence was an animatic. This process was implemented by Stephen Toback's H-B Production Technology Group, which also set up and maintained the in-house digital ink and paint systems for Hanna Barbera, as well as the post-production Avid and Pro Tools systems. Japan-based Mook Studios exclusively animated the second season without digital post-processing. Real Adventures maintained the classic show's realistic violence, featuring off-screen deaths of villains and allies. The use of these cutting-edge techniques, as well as the show's troubled development, led to speculation that each episode had cost over $500,000 to make (considered the high end of contemporary animation budgets).

=== Music ===
Bodie Chandler directed music for Quest, and Gary Lionelli, Thomas Chase, Stephen Rucker, Lawrence H. Brown, Guy Moon, Kevin Kiner, Christophe Beck, and Mark Koval wrote incidental music and cues. Lionelli conceived a new main theme based on the original 1960s Jonny Quest theme by Hoyt Curtin. Composer Guy Moon considered working for the show the "hardest thing I've done in my life" due to the producers' demands for epic music: "They want a big orchestra with a good synth rig. [...] It's great because they push me so much I'll probably replace my whole demo reel with Jonny Quest music. It's hip and it's current." Stephen Rucker and Thomas Chase (who later composed for The Powerpuff Girls) used MIDI to facilitate composing. Chase appreciated the producers' commitment to scoring, noting, "For many kids, animation music is their first exposure to orchestral music."

=== QuestWorld ===
Producers cultivated an element of virtual reality through QuestWorld, a cyberspace simulation rendered with three-dimensional computer animation and motion capture. QuestWorld was designed as a futuristic application of contemporary technology, similar to the classic series's high-tech lasers, satellites, and robots. Seibert traced its origin to "hav[ing] the same problem that James Bond does now. [...] When you look at even his newest gadgets, they're somewhat quaint." H-B marketers polled children on their familiarity with virtual reality, discovering that each child was aware of the concept. Planners took inspiration from cyberpunk novels written by Neal Stephenson and William Gibson, including Snow Crash.

H-B initially contracted Dream Quest Images to animate QuestWorld but was credited for work on only a single episode, as competitor Disney acquired the studio in April 1996, necessitating a different vendor. Animation company Buzz F/X, based in Montreal and Santa Monica, created the season one sequences. Work began in April 1996 with the opening titles—a gliding journey through a canyon of green, cartographic lines with scenes illuminated upon the walls. QuestWorld characters were created as wireframe models, augmented with faces scanned from clay busts, then digitally painted and inked. Buzz F/X used mostly inexperienced animators, as budgetary constraints would not permit hiring seasoned employees.

Race and Surd fighting in QuestWorld from season two's "Cyberswitch"

Work followed on "Escape to Questworld" and "Trouble on the Colorado" as animators worked 12 hours a day, six days a week in a small garage with inadequate computers. Buzz F/X augmented the small team in July with ten recruits, but only two were experienced. Amateur employees struggled with lighting and with synchronizing jerky motion capture from the House of Moves in Venice Beach; Quest was their first capture production order. By August, the team was working 14 hours a day, seven days a week, including full nights and mornings.

After two more episodes, Buzz F/X terminated its unprofitable contract with H-B, later filing for bankruptcy in 1997 due to $3.6 million of debt created by work on Quest. H-B hired Blur Studio to finish the second season's scenes on a 10-week production schedule. Blur used Intergraph hardware, and its sharp performance attracted press attention and sealed an amicable relationship with H-B. Both companies produced in total roughly one hundred minutes of computer animation for QuestWorld.

=== International promotion and network run ===
Turner Broadcasting promoted the series in 40 countries and 14 languages to establish international markets. Broadcasters included Antena 3 in Spain, TF1 in France, Channel One in Russia, RAI in Italy, Taurus Film in Germany, the BBC in the United Kingdom, SCTV in Indonesia, and Asia Television in 10 Asian countries, representing ATL's first animated series to be broadcast in both English and Cantonese. Turner planned to introduce US-style animation to the Asian market through Quest. The show was launched in Singapore on TCS Channel 5 (now known as MediaCorp Channel 5) to take advantage of Singapore's "sophisticated retail sector and well-developed licensing industry". Brandweek reported in 1995 that the show's budget, including merchandising and promotional costs, topped $40 million.

Director Richard Donner, producer Lauren Shuler Donner, and Jane Rosenthal purchased rights for a live-action film, having expressed interest in the property after Turner acquired H-B. Peter Segal was attached to direct. Slated to begin production in mid-1995, filming was delayed until 1996 and ultimately never began. Turner advertised Real Adventures as the "next evolution in children's programming ... [redefining] television animation for the next generation." The company hosted a 1995 discussion with Peter Lawrence and Takashi at Yanceyville and later aired previews at United States waterpark events. Staged in major US cities, these "dive-in theaters" featured previews of new series and local celebrities, including Jennifer Love Hewitt, Lacey Chabert, Cameron Finley, and Ashley Johnson for the UCLA event. Turner announced the debut countries and TV stations on May 1, 1996.

Turner aired Real Adventures seven nights a week on TBS, TNT, and Cartoon Network for an unprecedented 21 weekly showings. Turner used this level of coverage to entice marketing partners, as typical cable programs (airing once per week) would not be able to attract desired merchandise interest. Turner aired several commercial spots featuring the Quest logo and show introductions to build viral support. Turner's marketers surmised that juvenile groups watching TNT in the morning, TBS in the afternoon, or Cartoon Network in prime time and late night were mutually exclusive. Real Adventures premiered August 26, 1996, three months after a 20-hour "Farewell Marathon" of original Quest. Promotional scope exceeded that of recent television events, such as NBC's Gulliver's Travels; industry insiders compared it to a feature film campaign.

The show averaged a 2.0 Nielsen rating over August and September 1996, considered a strong start for an animated series. Though Cartoon Network suffered declining viewership in 1996, Quest was consistently one of the highest-rated programs; later season one episodes drew around 650,000 viewers. Real Adventures's merchandise performed poorly, and it failed to build consistent ratings in its targeted demographics (though it did attract adult audiences). Turner tried to revive interest in February 1997 with a contest for an adventurous trip to Jamaica called Quest World Adventure. Cartoon Network did not order new episodes beyond the 52nd. Reruns aired for two years on Toonami until September 24, 1999; on Cartoon Network in other formats until 2004; and on CNX until 2003. Reruns were also seen in broadcast syndication for a time via The Program Exchange.

== Premise ==
Dr. Benton Quest, a famous phenomenologist, investigates mysterious occurrences and exotic locales with his son Jonny, adopted son Hadji Singh, bodyguard Race Bannon, Race's daughter Jessie, and pet bulldog Bandit. Real Adventures is set a few years after the classic series, making Jonny and his friends teenagers. Lawrence aimed to use "existing, real phenomenon"—such as the "Airstrips of Nazca, the Ruins of Teotihuacan or the possible existence of Giant Squid"—to capture audiences' curiosity. Stressing plausibility, he suggested writers cover real-world enigmas, cryptozoology, unique locales, an alien posing as the vice president, and fictional but "believable" mysteries. The Quests would frequently visit the virtual environment of QuestWorld and encounter the villainous Jeremiah Surd and Ezekiel Rage.

The Quests would sparingly fight "monsters of the week", instead battling antagonists whose conflicts lay in "personal objective or ambition [...] opposed by Dr. Quest". Lawrence stationed the family at a new compound on the coast of Maine, replete with houses, barns, and workshops. Rooms suited for each character included a library for Dr. Quest, a workshop for Jonny, a computer-equipped den for Jessie, a dojo and gym for Race, and a lighthouse lookout for Hadji's meditation. Lawrence equipped Dr. Quest with a fleet of air, land, and sea vehicles, including a 1940s biplane and a state-of-the-art catamaran named Questor with diving bells and smaller research vessels stored in the hulls. Peter Lawrence prided Real Adventures on the strength of its writing, opining that "very few writers in this or any other field actually write visually", and contesting that each episode would have "enough material or potential to develop into a movie".

=== Characters ===
Hadji, Jessie, and Jonny from the season one episode "Expedition to Khumbu"

Peter Lawrence described Jonny as a "hero in training" on the cusp of adulthood. He remarked that Jonny possessed "a straight-ahead, right-on attitude" free of introspection or self-doubt. At age 14, Jonathan "Jonny" Quest was a confident problem-solver prone to getting in trouble. Writers framed him as more an intuitive thinker than an intellectual and created tension by contrasting his father's academic leanings with Jonny's affinity for Race's daring lifestyle. Jonny inherited his father's driving curiosity (rendering him a "walking query"), as well as his mother's "restless, adventurous spirit". Takashi designed Jonny to be lean, wiry, athletic, and coordinated. Creative directors centered episodes around Jonny; Seibert summarized the shift:

We decided to make the show more Jonny-centric. If you analyze the original show, you'll see it's really the Dr. Quest and Race show. Jonny was just hanging out—after all, what can a 10-year-old do? He can't even ride his bike out of the neighborhood.

Hadji Singh, age 16, became Dr. Quest's personal assistant, lacking his mentor's formal education but sharing his burning interest in archaeology, anthropology, and the paranormal. A Hindu and yogi, he held a fatalistic attitude towards the show's drama, reacting to situations "from the philosophical point of view that everything is as it's supposed to be". Hadji often used wise aphorisms, taken from diverse cultures and sources and sometimes baffling Jonny. Lawrence cut Hadji's classic telekinesis to align his abilities with realistic yogi practices. "He doesn't say things like 'Sim, Sim Sala Bim' anymore", season one voice actor Michael Benyaer explained. "The writers and producers actually researched the actual yogic powers. He can do more plausible stuff. There is an episode where Hadji pretends to stop his breathing so that the bad guys think he is dead." Takashi drew Hadji taller and thinner than his classic counterpart.

Jessica "Jessie" Bannon, age 15, was characterized to be just as tough, smarter, and more thoughtful than Jonny. Written as "more of an egghead", she elected to spend time with Dr. Quest as Jonny did with Race and was "more in tune with Hadji". Turner conceived Jessie as cool, independent, and a strong role model for contemporary girls. Peter Lawrence took pains to ensure Jessie would not be written as "a guy in a skirt" and made her more mature than Jonny.

Roger T. "Race" Bannon (Jessie's father), age 38, retained his classic, laconic sense of humor and fearless, dependable nature. He retired from government work over ethical scruples with his former intelligence agency. Writers noted that Race was helplessly overprotective of Jessie, and Jonny was "the boy Race never had". Race was also given a Western American English accent and a knack for crafting elaborate, colorful similes. Peter Lawrence sculpted Race to be a "cowboy-philosopher or philosopher-warrior". Writers tasked Race with physical and self-defense training for the Quest team.

Dr. Benton C. Quest, age 55, retired from government research and operated from the "Quest Compound" on the coast of Maine. Driven by curiosity, he was "consulted by individuals, governments and corporations" to investigate enigmatic events. Described as "single-minded—almost to the point of obsession—in his pursuit of knowledge", he often encountered trouble as "his drive to learn blanks out more basic instincts like self-preservation". Jessie appreciated his ponderous sense of humor. The show's promoters summarized him as the "benevolent king" archetype.

Bandit, the family dog, also appeared in the series. Lawrence removed Bandit's clownish origins, stressing that Bandit could not understand English nor reliably save the family from perilous situations.

Summarizing the group's behavior, Lawrence wrote, "Jonny's response to danger will be close to Race's. Jessie's intrigue with mysterious, unexplained phenomena will be close to Dr. Quest's and Hadji, with his roots in a different culture and a more spiritual approach to life, is different again." Takashi designed each character as physically fit and well-sculpted to reflect "a more exercise-oriented society". Fred Seibert downplayed worries that the new characters would disappoint cult fans of the classic series. He hoped Real Adventures would find success as new interpretations of comic book heroes had done.

=== Season two changes ===
Season two directors Larry Houston and Davis Doi changed the show to resemble the classic franchise. Writer Glenn Leopold revived Hadji's latent psionic powers—including spoon-bending and rope tricks—as he felt the first season's realism was "not that interesting to watch". All characters lost a year in age; Jonny became 13. Writer Lance Falk returned Race to governmental guard duty, sealed by an episodic visit with classic Quest spymaster Phil Corven. Race lost his western accent (with Falk even comparing Race's western accent to Batman having a French accent), and Dr. Quest regained his classic red hair and exhibited rudimentary combat skills. Falk regarded Jessie as the "missing piece needed to complete the Quest family", and Leopold added slight romantic overtones to episodes. Some fans complained about changes to Jessie, criticized as a damsel in distress with stereotypically female pink clothes. Jonny saved Jessie from danger several times. Falk defended his portrayal as giving her realistic, human fears, such as claustrophobia. Censors asked the season two team to replace firearms with dart guns, notably in the episode "General Winter".

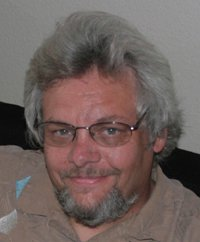
Lance Falk, season two writer

Season two writers took greater creative liberties with Real Adventures, invoking ghosts, other dimensions, and megalomaniacal schemes. Leopold and Falk sought to create a "slam-bang adventure show with real monsters" and heightened narrative emphasis on Jonny and his friends. Falk explained that cool contrivances took precedence over accuracy, stating that "Jonny Quest is a show with one foot in the fantastic, and one foot solidly based in reality." Opposed to QuestWorld, the new team was nonetheless contractually obligated to use it in their episodes. Falk felt that virtual reality undermined the show's "strong connection to reality" and suggested that after so many dangerous incidents, Dr. Quest would have turned the system off.

Writers brought back several classic characters, including Pasha the Peddler, Jezebel Jade, Dr. Zin and his twin daughters, Anaya and Melana. Falk honored Quest creator Doug Wildey by creating an eponymous grandfather for Jonny in the episode "Nuclear Netherworld", as well as paying homage to William Hanna's birthstate of New Mexico, where Jonny's grandfather resides. The team created Estella Velasquez as Jessie's mother to retcon the telefilms, feeling that Jade would never get married. Writers eventually killed off villains Ezekiel Rage and Dr. Jeremiah Surd in favor of new adversaries. Comparing Quest without Zin to "James Bond without S.P.E.C.T.R.E.", Falk penned a season finale featuring classic robot spies and a visceral fight between Dr. Quest and Zin. Falk planned to resuscitate Palm Key as the Quest home in new episodes. Cartoon Network did not renew Real Adventures, despite a pledge to explore the history of Jonny's mother Rachel in the season premiere.

== Episodes ==
Season	Episodes	Originally released	
Season	Episodes	First released	Last released
1	26	August 26, 1996	January 2, 1997
2	26	December 11, 1996	April 16, 1997

=== Season 1 (1996–97) ===
No.	Title	Written by	Storyboarded by	Original release date	Prod. code
1	"The Darkest Fathoms"	Peter Lawrence and Harv Zimmel	Mark Andrews, Egidio Dal Chele, Ernesto Guanlao and Robert Wood	August 26, 1996	H00616-94004
Two centuries ago, ruthless pirate Black Jack Lee rode his pirate ship, the Ivory Web, to the Bermuda sea floor. When oil explorers are assaulted by a ghost ship under his apparent captaincy, Dr. Quest prepares the Questor for an investigation.
2	"Escape to Questworld"	Peter Lawrence and Richard Merwin	Mark Andrews, Dell Barrass, Sean Bishop, Guy Donovan, Ernie Guanlao, Quintin Henson, Gloria Jenkins, Harry McLaughlin and Robert Wood	August 27, 1996	H00616-94021
Race is hired to contain a nerve gas leak in Chicago, the legacy of a botched raid on Dr. Jeremiah Surd years earlier. When he and Dr. Quest are trapped, it is up to Jonny, Jessie, and Hadji to find the renegade scientist.
3	"In the Realm of the Condor"	Peter Lawrence	Helene Giraud, Thomas Szabo and Scott Wood	August 28, 1996	H00616-94002
The Quest team follows Estella Scheele to find her missing ornithologist grandfather and ends up finding the lost golden city of El Dorado.
4	"Rage's Burning Wheel"	Michael Ryan Story by: Glenn Leopold and Michael Ryan	Ric Estrada, Kenneth Mundie, Steve Simone, Scott Wood and Mark Andrews	August 29, 1996	H00616-94018
Apocalyptist Ezekiel Rage hijacks the space shuttle carrying Dr. Quest and Hadji. Back on Earth, Jonny and Jessie must find a way to stop Rage's apostles, who have taken over Mission Control.
5	"Ndovu's Last Journey"	Michael Ryan and Peter Lawrence	Kenneth Mundie, Gregory Nelson, Kunio Shimamura and Scott Wood	August 30, 1996	H00616-94016
Jonny, Jessie, and Hadji track an elephant, Ndovu, as it returns to the elephants' graveyard. On the way, they run into poachers who are not willing to wait for Ndovu to die.
6	"Manhattan Maneater"	Peter Lawrence and Richard T. Murphy	Jennifer Yuh, Ernie Guanlao, Quintin Henson, Gloria Jenkins and Scott Wood	September 2, 1996	H00616-94013
New York City lives under the threat of a deadly slayer during a trip by Dr. Quest, Hadji, and Jonny; they learn that the killer is from a different type of jungle and become embroiled in a citywide race to eliminate the culprit.
7	"East of Zanzibar"	Peter Lawrence	Mark Andrews, Sean Bishop and Scott Wood	September 3, 1996	H00616-94001
The Republic of Seychelles has suffered the mysterious wrecks of whaling vessels and the loss of a submarine. Dr. Quest's investigation is hampered when Jonny and Hadji are swept up by a waterspout while sailing.
8	"Assault on Questworld"	Samuel Graham, Chris Hubbell and Michael Ryan	Sean Bishop, Adriano Gonzales, Gloria Jenkins, Scott Wood and Ernie Guanlao	September 4, 1996	H00616-94036
With Dr. Quest and Race in the Himalayas for a phenomenology conference, Jonny and Jessie are helpless in their attempts to free Hadji, whose mind is being drained by Surd as part of a plan to take over the Quest Compound.
9	"Ezekiel Rage"	Glenn Leopold	Mark Andrews, Guy Donovan, Sean Bishop and Scott Wood	September 5, 1996	H00616-94015
His plea for help turned down, a compromised spy and his family are presumably killed on duty. But when Dr. Quest visits a cave in New Mexico, he finds that Ezekiel Rage and his anger towards the government are very alive. Though this is Rage's second chronological appearance in the series, it is his first production-wise, having been produced before Rage's Burning Wheel.
10	"Alien in Washington"	Peter Lawrence and Matthew Malach	Mark Andrews, Gerald Forton, Quintin Henson, Joy Kolitsky, Guy Donovan, Ernie Guanlao, Gloria Jenkins and Scott Wood	September 6, 1996	H00616-94017
Extraterrestrial transmissions turn out to be warnings to stop a series of space experiments, and the Vice President turns out to be an alien.
11	"Return of the Anasazi"	Peter Lawrence	Kenneth Mundie and Robert Wood	September 9, 1996	H00616-94003
Holding an Anasazi beacon capable of calling the alien fathers of current technology, Alice Starseer is pursued by men in black and asks Dr. Quest for help, whose capture provokes a cross-country rescue by Jonny and Jessie.
12	"The Alchemist"	Peter Lawrence Story by: Kip and Kern Konwiser	Ric Estrada, Kenneth Mundie, Steve Simone, Scott Wood and Mark Andrews	September 10, 1996	H00616-94014
Dr. Quest is commissioned to find the Philosopher's Stone, which is reputed to turn dross to gold. But when he succeeds, the stone is later stolen from a museum by Quest's partner, who wants to try it out for himself.
13	"Trouble on the Colorado"	Samuel Graham, Chris Hubbell and Michael Ryan	Adrian Gonzales, Ricardo Estrada, Steven Simone and Joy Kolitsky	September 11, 1996	H00616-94040
Alice Starseer is returning to Earth to lay her grandfather to rest, and Dr. Quest has been invited to attend the ceremony. Old enemies and new allies lurk among the rapids of the Colorado River, the route to the meeting site.
14	"In the Wake of Mary Celeste"	Chris Trengrove	Sean Bishop, Guy Donovan, Ernie Guanlao, Quintin Henson, Gloria Jenkins and Jennifer Yuh	September 12, 1996	H00616-94007
A century ago, the cargo ship Mary Celeste sank under mysterious circumstances. While on an expedition to find the Mary Celeste's remains, Dr Quest discovers what look like crop circles at the bottom of the Sargasso Sea and a graveyard of ships in an area barren of marine life.
15	"AMOK"	Chris Hubbell, Samuel Graham and Michael Ryan	Ricardo Estrada and Gloria Yuh-Jenkins	September 13, 1996	H00616-94044
On an archaeological expedition in Borneo, the Quest team run into a giant creature, reputed to savagely attack from all directions at the same time. Then they find out that man can be the greater beast.
16	"Besieged in Paradise"	Chris Hubbell, Samuel Graham and Michael Ryan	Ricardo Estrada, Steven Simone, Romeo Francisco and Guy Donovan	September 16, 1996	H00616-94038
Jeremiah Surd taps into, and gains control of, the cetacean communications bandwidth, prodding cetaceans worldwide into savage attacks. The Quest team enlists the help of Captain Havell to stop Surd.
17	"The Spectre of the Pine Barrens"	Matthew Malach	Ernie Guanlao, Quintin Henson, Kunio Shimamura and Scott Wood	September 17, 1996	H00616-94005
Dr. Quest, Jonny, and Hadji head to New Jersey to investigate the Jersey Devil. Then they run into a two-hundred-year-old feud between descendants of the Redcoats and the Minutemen over the original copy of the Declaration of Independence.
18	"Heroes"	Matthew Malach and Peter Lawrence	Adrian Gonzales, Guy Donovan, Ric Estrada, Joy Kolitsky, Steve Simone and Scott Wood	September 18, 1996	H00616-94025
Despite the breaking of its head, the recovery of a statue of Apollo from Greece by Quest Enterprises heralds an important archaeological find, sure to catch the attention of Jeremiah Surd, who has his own plans for the monument.
19	"The Ballad of Belle Bonnet"	Peter Lawrence and Michael Ryan Story by: Will Jarvis	Jennifer Yuh, Robert Wood and Guy Donovan	September 19, 1996	H00616-94011
Centuries ago, a female thief stole a wagonload of gold to help an Indian school stay open, but the gold and the thief were lost in vast caverns under the American desert. Jonny discovers that her ghost is still guarding the cache.
20	"In the Darkness of the Moon"	Peter Lawrence, Michael Ryan and Michael Maurer	Armando Carrillo, Ric Estrada, Adrian Gonzales and Steve Simone	September 23, 1996	H00616-94020
A werewolf attack in northern Canada brings the Quest team to investigate. Race finds romance with an attractive outback doctor who turns out to be the last female descendant of a werewolf family.
21	"The Secret of the Moai"	John Pelinski	Ric Estrada, Steve Simone, Guy Donovan and Robert Wood	September 24, 1996	H00616-94046
Thousands of years ago, the missing link between apes and humans was engineered by aliens possessing auditory DNA-altering technology. When Dr. Quest locates an alien ship on Easter Island, Surd experiments in devolution and turns Dr. Quest and Race Bannon into apes.
22	"Expedition to Khumbu"	Peter Lawrence and Harv Zimmel	Bryan Andrews, Sean Bishop, Guy Donovan, Ernesto Guanlao, Quintin Henson and Scott Wood	September 25, 1996	H00616-94006
Betrayed by a colleague who wants sole credit for proving the existence of the yeti, Dr. Quest is all but lost in an avalanche in the mountains of Nepal; when his family begins searching, they are threatened by a similar fate.
23	"Ice Will Burn"	Peter Lawrence and Michael Ryan Story by: Peter Lawrence and Ben Schwartz	Sean Bishop, Edward Lin and Guy Donovan	September 26, 1996	H00616-94028
On a delivery mission for Dr. Quest in Siberia, Jessie Bannon and the Quest Jet fall to the earth and break through the ice to land in a massive underworld, where she is hailed as the one who will restore a volcano's heat.
24	"Future Rage"	Glenn Leopold	Thomas Szabo and Guy Donovan	October 29, 1996	H00616-94019
Ezekiel Rage steals a compact thermonuclear device and plans to melt the polar ice caps. The team set out in the Questsled to foil his plan, unaware that the Aurora Borealis in the sky above shall prove their greatest weapon.
25	"Alligators and Okeechobee Vikings"	Peter Lawrence Story by: Ben Schwartz	Bryan Andrews, Mark Andrews and Scott Wood	November 1, 1996	H00616-94010
Thought to be eco-terrorists, Vikings in alligator suits assault a drilling rig and prompt an inquiry from Dr. Quest. After Jonny and Hadji are lost in an air boat incident, he finds that the Vikings are the least of his problems.
26	"To Bardo and Back"	Peter Lawrence, Dean Caccamo and Michael Ryan	Adrian Gonzales, Ric Estrada, Steve Simone, Guy Donovan, Joy Kolitsky and Scott Wood	January 2, 1997	H00616-94039
By watching Jonny practice, Surd learns that the team will be attending a rodeo and uses a mad bull to seriously injure Race. The stakes are increased when Dr. Quest attempts to miraculously repair the damage in Questworld.

=== Season 2 (1996–97) ===
No.	Title	Written by	Storyboarded by	Original release date	Prod. code
27	"The Mummies of Malenque"	Glenn Leopold	Ric Estrada, Kenneth Mundie, Steve Simone, Scott Wood and Mark Andrews	December 11, 1996	H00616-94049
Race and the team travel to Colombia to pick up Jessie from a vacation with her mother, Estella. She has been studying the extinct Malenque civilization, whose mummies hold a dark and perilous secret.
28	"Rock of Rages"	Lance Falk	Francisco Barrios, Romeo Francisco and Don Manuel	December 12, 1996	H00616-94051
The Quest team journeys to the Czech Republic to help translate an artifact that's supposed to be the key to controlling a Golem. They run afoul of an ex-KGB operative who's determined to reactivate the Golem to overthrow the government.
29	"Bloodlines"	Glenn Leopold	Armando Carrillo and Sean Song	December 13, 1996	H00616-94050
Following clues of disturbing childhood memories, Hadji, Race, Jonny, and Jessie fly to Calcutta to find Pasha Peddler. They discover that his shop has been trashed by Thugs, and the resulting pursuit reveals the truth about Hadji's lineage.
30	"Race Against Danger"	Lance Falk	Romeo Francisco, Kurt Conner, Don Manuel, Sean Song and George Booker	December 16, 1996	H00616-94052
Race Bannon and the team visit Intelligence One training grounds to survey new cloaking mask technology. But when an old enemy shows up, Jonny and Race must run the obstacle course to fight for their lives.
31	"The Dark Mountain"	Glenn Leopold	Armando Carrillo, Sean Song and Danilo Bulandi	December 17, 1996	H00616-94008
Is Bigfoot on the loose in the Quest compound? More importantly, why is he stealing electronic components? The Quest team has to find the answers before a couple of big-game hunters bag themselves an exotic trophy.
32	"Cyberswitch"	Glenn Leopold	Romeo Francisco, Don Manuel, Sean Song and Scott Wood	December 18, 1996	H00616-94009
While driving his smart car, Race and Jonny are captured and taken to Jeremiah Surd, whose insidious new invention allows him to assume control of Race's body. Can Dr. Quest be warned in time, let alone reverse the process?
33	"Undersea Urgency"	Lance Falk	Armando Carrillo and Sean Bishop	December 19, 1996	H00616-94012
A seaquake releases a horde of murderous amphibians on a nearly completed underwater research facility.
34	"Nemesis"	Glenn Leopold	Don Manuel, Dan Veesenmeyer, Romeo Francisco, Sean Young, Francisco Barrios and Sean Bishop	December 20, 1996	H00616-94022
Dr. Zin returns and subverts Dr. Benton Quest's satellite design to hold the world for ransom.
35	"DNA Doomsday"	Robert Goodman and Glenn Leopold Story by: Robert Goodman	Armando Carrillo, Sean Song and Sean Young	December 23, 1996	H00616-94024
During a simulation to test out a military installation's defenses, a bio-computer is out of control.
36	"Ghost Quest"	Glenn Leopold	Romeo Francisco, Ric Estrada, Don Manuel and Sean Song	December 25, 1996	H00616-94026
En route to Nova Scotia in the new Questor II, Jonny, Jessie, and Hadji discover a mysterious island enshrouded in fog with a strange caretaker, supernatural phenomena, and a tragic past.
37	"Nuclear Netherworld"	Lance Falk and Chip Baloo	Armando Carrillo, Sean Song and Sean Bishop	December 26, 1996	H00616-94023
While visiting Jonny's Grandpa Doug on his ranch, Jonny and Hadji find out that a nearby biodome experiment is actually a cover for a plant making weapons-grade uranium.
38	"Eclipse"	Glenn Leopold	Tate Eastwood, Francisco Barrios, Romeo Francisco, Don Manuel and Sean Song	December 27, 1996	H00616-94030
The team lands in New Orleans to watch the lunar eclipse. Plans change when a mysterious woman pursued by strangers armed with silver bullets charms Hadji and proposes to move the viewing party to her mansion. Elements of this episode were recycled from an unfinished episode of SWAT Kats: The Radical Squadron, by writers Glenn Leopold and Davis Doi; parts were also recycled for the direct-to-video film, Scooby-Doo on Zombie Island.
39	"Without a Trace"	Michael Ryan Story by: Melody Fox	Armando Carrillo, Sean Song and Barrington Bunce	December 30, 1996	H00616-94034
Air Force One has been hijacked, and the government has arrested Dr. Quest as its prime suspect. Jonny and the gang struggle to find the plane and challenge Surd, armed with his infamous nerve gas and Questworld tricks.
40	"Village of the Doomed"	Glenn Leopold	Armando Carrillo	December 31, 1996	H00616-94031
While driving in England on a fly-fishing trip, Jonny and Dr. Quest are assaulted by a crazed man with a microchip in his neck. They recuperate in the quiet town of Wychford under the watchful eye of a chip manufacturer.
41	"Dark Sentinel"	Michael Ryan Story by: Michael Ryan and Melody Fox	Gregory Garcia, Romeo Francisco and Don Manuel	February 10, 1997	H00616-94029
In Cameroon, Dr. Quest hopes to learn more about a restorative tree sap threatened by loggers. All parties are put in danger when a researcher's son goes unconscious and an ancient tribe's guardian appears.
42	"Other Space"	Lance Falk	Romeo Francisco, Barrington Bunce, Don Manuel and Francisco Barrios	February 11, 1997	H00616-94027
With the help of Dr. Quest's theories, professor Diana Cruz has opened a portal to another dimension. When the team arrives to evaluate the findings, otherworldly interlopers appear to stake their claim on Earth.
43	"Digital Doublecross"	Glenn Leopold	Armando Carrillo and Barrington Bunce	February 12, 1997	H00616-94035
Hot off the heels of a Hoverboard race, Jonny and Jessie load up the Questworld game Mega Quest to settle the score. But when a sleeper virus implanted by Surd warps the game, more than bragging rights is put on the line.
44	"Thoughtscape"	Lance Falk	Romeo Francisco, Sean Song, Don Manuel, Barrington Bunce and Carlos Lemos	February 13, 1997	H00616-94033
Intercepted by Surd on a return trip from the movies, Jessie goes on a rampage at the Quest Compound before passing out. Can Jonny and Dr. Quest undo the subconscious brainwashing, or will Surd finally have his revenge?
45	"The Bangalore Falcon"	Glenn Leopold	Armando Carrillo and Barrington Bunce	February 14, 1997	H00616-94037
Visiting Hadji, the team are taken for a ride in Pasha's new helicopter; they spot a rare falcon thought to be extinct. A burglary at the palace proves they are not the only ones interested in the bird or its mystical homeland.
46	"Diamonds and Jade"	Shaun McLaughlin and Lance Falk	Romeo Francisco, Sean Song, Don Manuel and Rachel Brenner	March 14, 1997	H00616-94032
A famous Indonesian gem goes missing, and three jewel buyers turn up dead. Race, Jonny, and Jessie hit the streets of Djakarta with Jezebel Jade to recover the prize; their opponents are not the thieves but the shadow they cast.
47	"The Edge of Yesterday"	Michael Ryan	Armando Carrillo and Barrington Bunce	March 17, 1997	H00616-94041
Ezekiel Rage dooms the world to destruction when he plants a thermonuclear bomb two miles within the Earth's crust. With the apocalypse nearing, Jonny, Jessie, and Hadji resort to Dr. Quest's last-ditch program, "Rachel", a time portal.
48	"The Haunted Sonata"	Glenn Leopold	Romeo Francisco, Don Manuel and Mark Pacella	March 18, 1997	H00616-94042
Jonny and Jessie attend a recital of Franz Duncek's work in Prague, where a possessed piano crashes through the audience. A lost sonata is found in the palace's catacombs soon after, but those halls hold a much darker secret.
49	"General Winter"	Lance Falk	Armando Carrillo and Barrington Bunce	March 26, 1997	H00616-94043
Communist visionary General Vostok returns, seeking to harness the power of winter itself. With the power of ice, he forces Dr. Quest to build the perfect weapon; can Jonny infiltrate his base and escape Vostok's chilling grip?
50	"Night of the Zinja"	Glenn Leopold	Romeo Francisco, Don Manuel and Francisco Barrios	April 14, 1997	H00616-94045
Upon his deathbed, Dr. Zin commands his daughters to carry out his dream and eliminate the Quest family. The operation begins when an android assaults Race and the team in Tokyo to recover Dr. Quest's movement prototypes. But it is revealed that this was simply a setup to test his daughters' abilities in the event of his passing. In this episode, it is unclear whether or not Dr. Zin had actually died, due to his appearance in the very next episode.
51	"The Robot Spies"	Lance Falk	Romeo Francisco, Francisco Barrios, Don Manuel and Rachel Brenner	April 15, 1997	H00616-94048
Dr. Zin revives his Robot Spies and ravages the Quest Compound, abducting Jonny, Jessie, and her mother Estella in the process. Dr. Quest and Race team up with Jade to infiltrate his lair, but their arrival is well anticipated.
52	"More Than Zero"	Michael Ryan	Armando Carrillo and Barrington Bunce	April 16, 1997	H00616-94047
Race, Dr. Quest, Jonny, and Hadji travel to a Venetian mansion to authenticate the claims and machinery of paranormal scientists. The situation turns dire when the machine accidentally empowers a malevolent entity.

== Cast ==
The first season of Real Adventures featured J. D. Roth as Jonny, George Segal as Dr. Quest, Robert Patrick as Race, Jesse Douglas as Jessie, Michael Benyaer as Hadji, and veteran voice actors Frank Welker and Michael Bell as Bandit, Dr. Jeremiah Surd and Ezekiel Rage, respectively. A childhood fan of the original series, J.D. Roth was inspired by Turner's vision for the new series and swiftly accepted the role of Jonny. Roth was attracted by Jonny's "star quality" and approved of his characterization as a real kid without superpowers. He enjoyed Jonny's infectious enthusiasm and impulsive alacrity. Roth also admired the show's educational quality, something he had tried to integrate into his personal television pilots. When asked about how he played the relationship with Jonny's father, he commented, "Jonny is crazy about his dad. He looks up to him and thinks he is the smartest man ever to walk to face of the earth. He has the typical teenage relationship with his father, but his father definitely sees something in him. Dr. Quest knows that Jonny is going to be something really special." Michael Benyaer also enjoyed playing Hadji: "[he] is one of the few roles for an ethnic actor that is not a bad guy. I mean, how many East Indian heroes have been on television? Hadji is for the sensitive kids out there. He is the outsider in all of us." A Star Wars fan, Benyaer was happy to work with Mark Hamill for "In the Realm of the Condor". Peter Lawrence's request for an Indian-descended voice actor was seen as an "unusual case of multi-ethnic casting".

The producers struggled to cast Jessie Bannon. Peter Lawrence ultimately chose Jesse Douglas, who he felt reflected Jessie's energy and intelligence—"[Jesse Douglas] has immense energy, huge energy, and is the kind of woman who could do all the kind of things Jessie could do—you know, athletic, smart, so and so forth [sic]." Douglas impressed Lawrence with her active lifestyle, including ballet, equestrianism, and tennis. When asked about the character's inclusion, Douglas stated, "I'd be bummed if I upset anybody. Jessie is pretty cool. It is not like she is a girl who is whining all the time. If anything, she is a really good springboard for the rest of the storyline." Roth supported her, claiming that "Jonny hasn't discovered girls yet but when he does Jessie would be the type of girl he'd like to be with ... I think something will happen between them but right now Jess is his best friend." H-B chief Fred Seibert agreed, hinting that as adults "there might be a Tracy/Hepburn thing going on." Turner approached George Segal to audition for the part of Dr. Quest. Segal described the show as having "a real family feeling about it ... I'd never seen this stuff before. That was quite remarkable."

Hanna-Barbera bought out the first cast's contracts and hired new actors for the second season. This cast featured Quinton Flynn as Jonny, John de Lancie as Dr. Quest, Granville Van Dusen (for the first two episodes) and Robert Foxworth as Race, Jennifer Hale as Jessie, and Rob Paulsen as Hadji. Paulsen previously voiced Hadji in The New Adventures of Jonny Quest and the two Quest telefilms. Don Messick was hired to reprise his classic role as Dr. Quest but was forced into retirement by a stroke during early sessions. Van Dusen voiced Bannon in the 1986 Quest series, and Foxworth took over the part after auditioning for Dr. Quest. Frank Welker, Michael Bell, and B.J. Ward reprised their respective roles as Bandit, Surd, Rage and Iris (the QuestWorld A.I.) in the second season. The casting changes were public information at the time of the series premiere; Fred Seibert hoped that "viewers won't be able to tell" differences between seasons.

== Marketing ==
Turner launched a massive marketing campaign to promote Real Adventures, intending to reach 80% of American children aged six to eleven. Each Turner network spent $5 to $7 million for a total of $20 million invested in promotion; the company contracted 33 licensees. Other reports pegged the budget at $40 million, and Marketing Week estimated that the series launched with $300 million of merchandising support. The Wall Street Journal called Quest a "property to watch" in 1995; People and Good Housekeeping considered it a surefire blockbuster. Turner provided digital and bound style guides featuring collections of Quest artwork, coloring instructions, and product ideas. Produced for $100,000 and believed to be the first of its kind, the digital style guide included fonts, logos, character art, merchandising mock-ups, voice clips, and other interactive content. Hanna-Barbera launched Questworld.com as the show's internet hub, presenting it as if written by members of the Quest team. Complementing the show's educational, real-world premise, the site hosted links to academic, archaeological, and exploratory websites. Turner announced 32 licensees as of summer 1996.

Turner marketed Real Adventures through a substantial diversity of products, considering its Quest campaign a role model for future shows. Galoob acquired figurine licensing rights in 1995 and created a product line of vehicles, figures, and Micro Machines for fall 1996 release. Turner felt that Galoob's commitment legitimized the Quest marketing plan and next secured partnerships with Pizza Hut and food retailers. Pillsbury included $3 mail-in rebates for future Quest videos, display contests, and instant coupon offers on over 20 million packages. Campbell Soup Company released six holographic miniature posters on the same number of SpaghettiOs cans; the posters were awarded in Converting in 1997. General Mills outfitted boxes of Honey Nut Cheerios and Cinnamon Toast Crunch with offers for T-shirts and other items. Over five thousand Pizza Hut restaurants held a two-month-long giveaway of figurines with meals during the show's launch. Galoob failed to build popularity for its toys outside the United States and discontinued the line in 1997.

Upper Deck Company used art, sketches, and plots from the first season to create a sixty-piece card collection. Turner also marketed Zebco fishing poles bearing the Quest logo. Kid Rhino produced a cassette audio adventure based on the episode "Return of the Anasazi". The show's credits advertised a soundtrack available from Rhino, never sold or otherwise promoted. Turner listed several products in a "Quest Adventure Value Pack" coupon catalogue.

Marketers tied in classic Quest merchandise, launching a classic H-B promotion with Days Inn hotels, Planet Hollywood restaurants, and Little Debbie snack cakes and offering rebates for Cyber Insects and classic episodes. The marketing campaign culminated with the release of eight VHS Real Adventures season one episodes. Turner also released two episodes on laserdisc. Metropolitan newspapers worked with Turner to promote the videos through grab-bag giveaways. Turner sold merchandise through several international distributors and expected to make a $60 million profit per year in the Asia-Pacific region alone.

Savoy Brands International handled South American distribution, involving 750,000 retail outlets in Argentina, Chile, Peru, Guatemala, Honduras, Panama, Venezuela, Ecuador, and Colombia. Turner debuted Quest at a cocktail party for the European Licensing Fair in late 1996 and released merchandise in Europe through 90,000 retail outlets over the next six months. Copyright Promotions Licensing Group handled licensing in the United Kingdom. Turner ensured that the license agreements forbade retailers from discounting Quest items. The size of the marketing initiative left one newspaper reviewer wondering, "are [the Quests] back because they're too cool to die, or because they're too well known to be squandered as a licensing product?" Turner worried that the promotion might overhype the brand and timed commercial rollouts over the life of the show. H-B chief Fred Seibert expected high sales and success:

The new series is the beginning of what will be a multi-faceted global programming, marketing and merchandising effort ... The property still has great recognition and we think this will work because of the production values, because it's a real person solving real problems, and because it's the property that started the genre.

Dark Horse Comics composed a 12-issue series released over the show's first run, expecting higher store patronage and cross-selling. Editor Phil Amara assured fans that the comics would contain tributes to the classic Jonny Quest. Kate Worley wrote the Real Adventures series, and Francisco Lopez illustrated it; guest writers and artists regularly contributed. A lifetime fan of Quest, Eisner Award winner Paul Chadwick drew the cover of the final issue, depicting Jonny's descent into a cave on Easter Island. Dark Horse worked with Galoob to ship comic shop locator phone numbers and preview URLs with figurines. The company also advertised and released a special three-issue series through mail offers with over 8 million boxes of Honey Nut Cheerios. Three two-page "mini-adventures" packaged with existing Dark Horse products preceded the series's release. Dark Horse also worked with Converse to stage a promotion in early 1997 for a fan to appear in a Quest comic.

Terry Bisson and others working under the alias "Brad Quentin" produced 11 original novellas featuring adventure and virtual reality themes. Critics appreciated that the books may have drawn kids to reading, especially those interested in technology. The books credited Gregory Benford as the scientific advisor for the show, and each novella featured an epilogue by him speculating about future technological developments. The novellas made use of the first season's designs in their cover and interior art. Only certain comics and coloring books used season two's designs, such as Dark Horse's Countdown to Chaos, featuring General Vostok. Turner did not market the show again until April 2004, when Warner Home Video released the episodes "Escape to Questworld" and "Trouble on the Colorado" as TV Premiere DVD: The Real Adventures of Jonny Quest on MiniDVD.

=== Cover-up at Roswell ===
Virgin Sound and Vision produced an adventure game for the series named Cover-Up At Roswell, released in August 1996. Known as Escape from Quest World in development, Roswell cost $1 million to make. Virgin handled all marketing, sales, and distribution; Turner cross-promoted. Developers recycled fifty minutes of footage and art from six season one episodes to construct a new story about the Quest family gathering alien artifacts and saving an extraterrestrial from autopsy at the Pentagon. Jeremiah Surd and the Men in Black of General Tyler plan to misuse the technology and try to hinder the Quests. Gameplay consists of clicking areas on images of locations to navigate paths.

Virgin estimated the game would provide 20–25 hours of gameplay for adults and 80–100 hours for children. The season two cast provided all voices except for Michael Benyaer as Hadji and Charles Howerton as Dr. Quest. The game's music featured a "high-intensity orchestral sound" prone to monotony. One reviewer praised Roswell for "good entertainment and variety" but regretted low replay value and no modes of difficulty. Critics were divided over the puzzles, naming them both "ingenious" and "elementary". Peter Scisco of ComputerLife and FamilyPC's testers criticized some of the puzzles for relying on "reflexes, not logical thinking".

Entertainment Weekly rated the game B+, naming the puzzles "unimaginative ... Pac-Man rip-offs and dopey jigsaws". Scisco appreciated the nonviolent content and the inclusion of Jessie as a strong female character but considered the extraterrestrial story too familiar. A writer from The Sydney Morning Herald warned against buying the game for easily frightened children but recommended it for those who enjoy mental challenges.

=== Other promotions ===
Turner, TBS, and Holiday Inn partnered to hold an essay contest as part of the Safe America Foundation's "Quest for Safety" drive. From October 9 to November 4, 1996, spots encouraged children to write essays about important safety issues and personal safety. A panel of public safety and community leaders selected the winner, dubbing them the "Safest Kid in America". TBS posted the winner's essay to the kids section of its website and awarded them a position on the Real Adventures float for the 1997 Tournament of Roses Parade in Pasadena. Second-prize winners received bicycle helmets, T-shirts, and Jonny Quest lapel pins. Turner staged an international contest in February 1997 called "Quest World Adventure", featuring the grand prize of a trip to a "secret island" (Jamaica) in July to take part in a staged dramatic scenario.

Commercials instructed fans to mail in episodes' geographical destinations during sweeps week. Advertisements appeared through Time Warner's television channels, Sports Illustrated for Kids, DC Comics publications, radio stations, and Warner Brothers stores. The contest marked the first time that Cartoon Network U.S., TNT Europe, Cartoon Network Europe, Cartoon Network Asia, and Cartoon Network Latin America united for a single promotion. Turner encouraged local cable operators to submit their own spots, generating 34,000 ads among 174 cable systems for a total of $3.4 million in cross-channel media support. 50,000 children with a median age of 10 entered the competition, and 20,000 answered correctly. Turner selected 10 viewers from the United States and nine from Latin America and Asia as grand-prize winners. They and two-hundred others received Quest-themed adventure packs, including a backpack, flashlight and siren, travel journal, pen, T-shirt, and glow sticks. Cartoon Network aired the names of winning children on a special feature in which Jeremiah Surd issued personal threats.

Winners received all-expenses-paid trips to Ocho Rios, Jamaica, with up to three family members. Planners kept the destination secret until shortly before travel. In Jamaica, kids combated Surd's "environmental terrorism" by preventing him from finding the Jamaican "Irie" stones. Children received clues on the mission through e-mails seemingly written by Jonny Quest. Posing as allies, network employees prepared clues, buried treasure, and hosted barbecues, reggae concerts, and rafting trips. Participants searched for the stones at the White River, Dunn's River Falls, and Prospect Plantation; hosts filmed the proceedings for possible future promotions. The quest centered on cerebral challenges and puzzles. Attendees also learned about the history and ecology of Jamaica. The adventure doubled the show's ratings for February sweeps and tripled Questworld.com's hits. Brandweek awarded it the year's top honors for a global marketing promotion.

== Home media ==
On October 8, 1996, Turner Home Entertainment and the Cartoon Network Video line released all four volumes of the series on VHS, "The Alchemist", "Rage's Burning Wheel", "The Darkest Fathoms", and "Escape to Questworld", with each videocassette containing two episodes along with two bonus shorts from the What a Cartoon! series. Warner Home Video released only "Escape to Questworld" on MiniDVD in April 2004, then WHV (via Hanna-Barbera Cartoons and Warner Bros. Family Entertainment) released the first thirteen episodes on February 17, 2009, as Season 1, Volume 1 of The Real Adventures of Jonny Quest on DVD in Region 1. On March 27, 2012, Warner Archive released The Real Adventures of Jonny Quest: Season 1, Volume 2 on DVD in Region 1 as part of their Hanna–Barbera Classics Collection. It is a Manufacture-on-Demand (MOD) release, available exclusively through Warner's online store and Amazon.com. The complete second (and final) season was released to DVD on November 10, 2015, from Warner Archive. All 52 episodes were made available for digital purchase in 2013 on the iTunes Store.

DVD name	Number of episodes	Release date
Season One, Volume 1	13	February 17, 2009
Season One, Volume 2	13	March 27, 2012
The Complete Second Season	26	November 10, 2015

== Critical reception ==
The announcement of Jessie Bannon's inclusion caused backlash among Quest fans. TV Guide's editors feared that Jonny and Jessie would become romantically entangled, declaring her a "sappy little girl" and decrying the addition of "icky females" to the property. H-B Chief Fred Seibert responded, "Jessie is a little older and smarter than Jonny ... We're not doing Moonlighting here." Seibert also denied that Jessie had been created solely to appeal to little girls, citing extant support for Jonny and the classic team. Miami Herald columnist Leonard Pitts called Jessie an "effort to rewrite the past to conform to the sociopolitical mandates of the present" and political correctness "run amok". Karen Benezra of Billboard conversely welcomed the change from an all-male cast. The fiasco subsided after the Cyber Insects telefilm aired; Richard Eldredge of the Atlanta Journal-Constitution rebuffed the "icky girl" label, as Jessie saved Jonny's life and taught him patience. A test screening of Cyber Insects to 30- to 35-year-old males revealed that though some questioned her addition, most understood that, like certain elements criticized in the original series, it was a reflection of the times.

Some fans still took issue with the series's distance from classic Quest, which suffered accusations of cultural insensitivity and "racial and sexual stereotypes". Real Adventures evoked critical comparisons to the original series. F. Colin Kingston of Cinefantastique felt Real Adventures remained true to the classic show's formula and praised the "impressive" cast. R.D. Heldenfels of the Akron Beacon Journal recommended the show to "die-hard adult fans", affirming that Real Adventures maintained the violence and off-screen deaths of the old series, as even the opening titles featured "explosions, murder and mayhem". Scott Moore of The Washington Post judged the first season as "grittier and more lifelike" than the original Quest. Chicago Tribune critic Allan Johnson agreed that Real Adventures was less "way-out" and contrasted the shows in detail. TV Guide applauded the writing as "miles deeper and darker than on the old show"; Hadji's quotations impressed the magazine's reviewer. Ted of the Chicago Daily Herald called the first episode "vintage Quest", and Tony Simmons of The Panama City Times-Herald echoed this position:

The new series takes the best elements of the old—global adventures, cutting-edge technology and good-spirited teamwork—and updates it for the 1990s. The now-teen-age heroes are caught up in extraordinary dangers both in the "real" world and in virtual reality.

Critics debated the success of the show's premise. Peter Scisco of ComputerLife appreciated that the team "rely on their brains, not mutant superpowers". Joe Queenan of People praised Turner's shift from the "politically correct claptrap" of Captain Planet and the Planeteers, giving Real Adventures a B grade as "children's programming the way it oughta be". Saturday Morning Fever authors Timothy and Kevin Burke contrarily felt the show lacked "the sense of why the original was so successful". They disliked H-B's packaging of disparate seasons as one series, preferring the second for its characters and classic references. Greg Aaron of HotWired praised the franchise's return but warned against QuestWorld hype, arguing that "it will take more than visual sophistication to hook today's viewers".

Hanna-Barbera founder and chairman Joseph Barbera considered Real Adventures a "disaster" because of changes to the characters and stories. He conceded, "that's their business. Everybody needs to do their own thing." Critics generally enjoyed the characters and voice acting. Queenan also liked the cast, particularly George Segal. Saturday Morning Fever praised Jessie Bannon for her resemblance to Dr. Quest. Johnson approved of the age jump, as Jonny and Hadji were now old enough to be part of the action. He considered Jessie "cool ... she gives Jonny grief just because she can, and she's not afraid of the action." He did not enjoy the "toned down" portrayal of Race Bannon. Some fans objected to Race's Western accent in the first season. Peter Lawrence defended the portrayal of Race as a "man of action, not thought—though perfectly capable of deep thought", noting that his accent and mannerisms encouraged variety, surprise, and originality.

The quality of Quest's traditional and computer animation split critics. Henry Mietkiewicz of the Toronto Star scathingly criticized the show for "facile plots heavily laced with jarring science fiction and incongruous computer animation", naming QuestWorld a "poorly explained techno-gimmick". Le Figaro concurred but praised QuestWorld for capturing the attention of young viewers. He praised QuestWorld but regarded traditional sequences as "flat and textureless, with minimal characterization, unnaturally stiff movement, and poor execution of shading and shadow". Ted Cox of the Chicago Daily Herald agreed that animated motion was sometimes "remarkably uneven" but lauded realistic imagery like "the play of light on the ocean". TV Guide also found the animation somewhat flat but considered the sound effects and backgrounds to be state-of-the-art.

Special effects director Alberto Menache criticized QuestWorld in Understanding Motion Capture for Computer Animation and Video Games, considering it a mistake-laden failure. He explained that the size difference between the motion capturers and the characters caused unsteady animation and shaking, consequently mismatching interaction with props and uneven terrain. Menache blamed the show's budget, which did not allow for digital post-production and review; producers instead expected "plug-and-play" results straight from the capture studio. Menache concluded that the QuestWorld sequences suffered from a "pipeline set up for mass production" with little testing or planning. Quest's Senior Vice President of Production Sherry Gunther admitted that the motion capture technology was "a little crude" and best suited for broad movements. Menache was less critical of the facial capture, considering it "medium-quality" but still unacceptable given H-B's resources. These criticisms mirrored the comments of Buzz F/X animator Francois Lord, who cited inexperienced Montreal animators and rushed production schedules. He pointed out that Blur Studios had more time, money, and experience for season two's sequences.

The show's sound was warmly received by the industry. Episodes "Nuclear Netherworld" and "Alien in Washington" were nominated respectively for music and sound editing Golden Reel Awards in 1997, and the entire series was nominated for an animated sound editing Golden Reel Award in 1998. Real Adventures was also nominated for a 1997 Daytime Emmy Award for music direction and composition.
