= Hotline (1982 film) =

1982 television film by Jerry Jameson

- VHS cover
- Genre: Drama; Horror; Thriller
- Written by: Stancil E.D. Johnson; David E. Peckinpah
- Directed by: Jerry Jameson
- Starring: Lynda Carter; Steve Forrest; Granville Van Dusen; Monte Markham
- Theme music composer: Johnny Harris
- Country of origin: United States
- Original language: English

Production
- Executive producers: Tom McDermott; Ron Samuels
- Producers: Ron Samuels; Gary Credle
- Cinematography: Matthew F. Leonetti
- Editor: Tom Stevens
- Running time: 96 minutes
- Production company: Ron Samuels Productions

Original release
- Network: CBS
- Release: October 16, 1982

Hotline is a 1982 American made-for-television horror thriller film directed by Jerry Jameson. The working title of the film was Reach Out.

== Plot ==
After a long shift at the bar, which included serving a drunk demanding of sexual favors, art student Brianne O'Neill returns home longing for a good night's rest. Little does she know that she is being watched by a mysterious stalker, who even breaks into her house without her knowing. Around the same time, Justin Price arrives, a friendly psychiatrist from the bar who claims that he followed her home because she was being followed by the drunk. Believing that he scared away the stalker, Brianne shows her gratitude by taking on volunteer work at his hotline practice, despite her busy schedule.

She makes a good start at the hotline, helping several people with their problems, and thereby impressing Justin and her colleague Rick Hernandez. However, it does not take long before she is receiving scary phone calls from a mysterious person admitting to recent murders from the newspaper headlines and instructing her with game rules. Brianne is worried about the situation, but Justin and Rick believe that she is the victim of prank calls. Nevertheless, she follows the instructions of the psychotic caller, who calls himself 'The Barber', and tries to unravel his clues, which provides her a list of his victims.

Despite other people's claims that she is reading too much into it, Brianne becomes obsessed with solving The Barber's clues. She starts to record his calls and another hint leads her to a deranged murder suspect in Reno, Charlie Jackson. Without gaining any information, she returns to the airport for a flight back home, and there she receives another call from The Barber. Failing to see a familiar face, Brianne returns home, where she concludes that the only ones who knew she was in Reno were Justin, bartender coworker Barnie and her boss Kyle Durham. Kyle is close friends with Tom Hunter, an actor who has been in love with Brianne for a long time.

Afterwards, Brianne is fed up with The Barber's games and gets mad when he makes another call to her private number, which leads him to threatening to kill her. To prevent this from happening, she steps to the police, but The Barber informs her he knows about this and that he is not satisfied with it. Justin suspects Tom as the guilty one and collects evidence to prove it. Brianne is initially unwilling to believe Justin, until she one night at the bar concludes that Tom was on the spot during one of the murders.

Suddenly, after the shift, Kyle reveals himself as The Barber. She struggles to escape, but he easily overpowers her and tells her that he wants to kill her because of the pain she is putting Tom through by not responding to his love for her. As Kyle starts cutting her hair and preparing to murder her, Brianne is able to run away and fires at him with a harpoon, which killed him. Finally, a frightened Brianne embraces Justin, the scene freeze frames then, the credits roll.

== Cast ==
- Lynda Carter as Brianne O'Neill
- Steve Forrest as Tom Hunter
- Granville Van Dusen as Justin Price
- Monte Markham as Kyle Durham
- Joy Garrett as Judy
- James Reynolds as Ron Chandler
- Harry Waters, Jr. as Rick Hernandez
- James Booth as Charlie Jackson
- Frank Stallone as Barnie
