= Anndi McAfee =

American actress (born 1979)

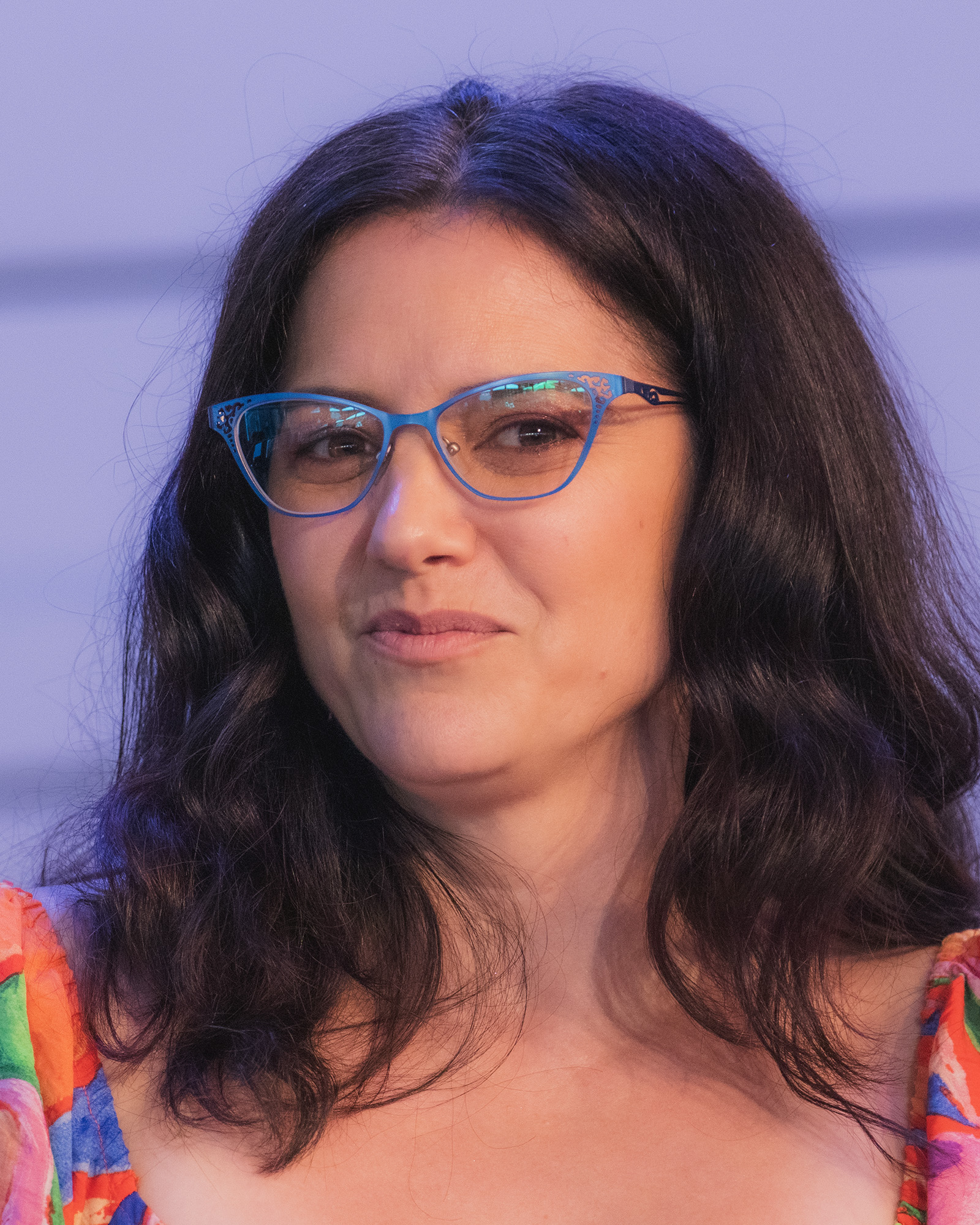
- McAfee in 2026
- Born: Anndi Lynn McAfee; September 28, 1979 (age 47); Los Angeles, California, U.S.
- Other name: Anndi L. McAfee
- Education: California State University, Northridge (M.A.)
- Occupation: Actress
- Years active: 1984–present
- Spouse: Robert Griffith (m. 2014)
- Relatives: Scott McAfee (brother)
- Website: anndi.com

Anndi Lynn McAfee (/ˈmækəfiː/ MAK-ə-fee; born September 28, 1979) is an American actress. She is best known for voicing Phoebe Heyerdahl in Nickelodeon's animated television series Hey Arnold! and associated media, Ashley Armbruster in Recess, and the second voice of Cera in The Land Before Time series (1997–2016), replacing Candace Hutson.

== Life and career ==
McAfee was born on September 28, 1979, in Los Angeles, California with type 1 Gaucher's disease. She started performing on stage when she was seven years old and began working on film projects a year later, primarily performing voiceover work.

In 1992, the true-crime, made-for-television film When No One Would Listen was nominated for a Young Artist Award for Best Actress in a Television Movie, owing to Anndi McAfee's acting in the role of the main lead's young daughter, Maggie Cochran. McAfee's performance was well-received by critics, despite it being one of her earliest acting roles. In 2004, McAfee graduated from California State University, Northridge with a master of arts degree in communication studies.

In 2014, McAfee posted a cover of "Let It Go" from Disney's 2013 film Frozen on her blog. In 2015, she signed with a New York voiceover agency, Don Buchwald, and now splits her time between Los Angeles and New York City.

== Filmography ==
=== Films ===
Year	Title	Role	Notes
1992	Tom and Jerry: The Movie	Robyn Starling (voice)	
1992	When No One Would Listen	Maggie Cochran	
1993	The Magic Paintbrush	Sara (singing voice)	
1995	Ice Cream Man	Heather Langley	
1997	The Land Before Time V: The Mysterious Island	Cera (voice)	Direct-to-video
1998	The Land Before Time VI: The Secret of Saurus Rock	Cera (voice)	Direct-to-video
2000	The Land Before Time VII: The Stone of Cold Fire	Cera (voice)	Direct-to-video
2001	Recess: School's Out	Gretchen Grunder (singing voice), Ashley "Ashley A" Armbruster (voice)	
2001	Recess Christmas: Miracle on Third Street	Ashley "Ashley A" Armbruster (voice)	Direct-to-video
2001	The Land Before Time VIII: The Big Freeze	Cera (voice)	Direct-to-video
2002	Hey Arnold!: The Movie	Phoebe Heyerdahl (voice)	
2002	The Land Before Time IX: Journey to Big Water	Cera (voice)	Direct-to-video
2003	Charlotte's Web 2: Wilbur's Great Adventure	Joy (voice)	Direct-to-video
2003	Recess: Taking the Fifth Grade	Ashley "Ashley A" Armbruster (voice)	Direct-to-video
2003	The Land Before Time X: The Great Longneck Migration	Cera (voice)	Direct-to-video
2003	Recess: All Growed Down	Ashley "Ashley A" Armbruster (voice)	Direct-to-video
2005	The Land Before Time XI: Invasion of the Tinysauruses	Cera, Longneck (voice)	Direct-to-video
2006	The Land Before Time XII: The Great Day of the Flyers	Cera (voice)	Direct-to-video
2007	The Land Before Time XIII: The Wisdom of Friends	Cera (voice)	Direct-to-video
2016	The Land Before Time XIV: Journey of the Brave	Cera, Petrie's Mom, Digger (voices)	Direct-to-video
2026	Toy Story 5	Additional voices	

=== Television ===
Year	Title	Role	Notes
1989	Dink, the Little Dinosaur	Amber (voice)	
1990	Family of Spies	Cynthia	Miniseries
1991	Conagher	Ruthie Teale	Television film
1991	Back to the Future	Additional Voices	Episode: "Batter Up"
1992	Doogie Howser, M.D.	Maggie Plenn	Episode: "That's What Friends Are For"
1992	Vinnie & Bobby	Sunshine Girl	Episode: "Full Heap"
1992–94	The Little Mermaid	Crabscout #2, Additional Voices	5 episodes
1993	Good Advice	Jacklyn	Episode: "Turning Thirteen"
1993	Home Free	Abby Bailey	13 episodes
1993	Nick & Noel	Sarah (voice)	Television film
1993, 1995	Baywatch	Lauren Taylor	2 episodes
1994	Harts of the West	Marti	Episode: "You Got to Have Heart"
1994	Lois & Clark: The New Adventures of Superman	Vanessa	Episode: "The Source"
1994	ABC Weekend Special	Mary Lennox (voice)	Episode: "The Secret Garden"
1994–95	Home Improvement	Beth	3 episodes
1994–95	Bump in the Night	Little Sister (voice)	2 episodes
1995	Gargoyles	Young Princess Katherine (voice)	Episode: "Long Way to Morning"
1995	Captain Planet and the Planeteers	Bitsy Blight (voice)	Episode: "Dirty Politics"
1995	Jonny Quest vs. The Cyber Insects	Jessie Bannon (voice)	Television film
1995–96	Boy Meets World	Jennifer, Melissa	2 episodes
1996–2004	Hey Arnold!	Phoebe Heyerdahl, Joy, Patrice, Betty, Fifi, additional voices	56 episodes
1997	Touched by an Angel	Rebecca Browner	Episode: "A Delicate Balance"
1997	Shin-chan	Weecock, Penny Milfer (voices)	Episode: "Shin Wars"
1997–2000	Recess	Ashley "Ashley A" Armbruster (voice)	17 episodes
1998	The New Batman Adventures	Carrie Kelley / 80's Robin (voice)	Episode: "Legends of the Dark Knight"
2000	What a Cartoon!	Mother Vulture (voice)	Episode: "Prickles the Cactus"
2001	Samurai Jack	Girl, Wee Bear, Pig #1 (voices)	Episode: "Aku's Fairy Tales"
2001–04	Lloyd in Space	Brittany Boviak (voice)	20 episodes
2002	As Told by Ginger	Meryl, Blonde Girl (voices)	Episode: "Sibling Revile-ry"
2004–05	Codename: Kids Next Door	Anna Worthington (voice)	2 episodes
2005	Las Vegas	Prostitute	Episode: "The Big Ed De-cline"
2007	What About Brian	Anastasia	Episode: "What About the Tangled Web"
2007–08	The Land Before Time	Cera, Lydia, Corythosaurus (voices)	26 episodes
2007–15	The Soup	Announcer	247 episodes
2012–13	Pound Puppies	Missy, Annie, Piper, Miffy, Tiffy, Cheryl, Karen, Ruby (voices)	5 episodes
2016	The ZhuZhus	Princess Iris	Episode: Janitor Day
2017	Hey Arnold!: The Jungle Movie	Phoebe Heyerdahl, Newswoman (voices)	Television film
2018	Robot Chicken	Phoebe Heyerdahl, Teenager, Girl (voices)	Episode: "Jew No. 1 Opens a Treasure Chest"
2019	The Lion Guard	Flamingo Girl #1 (voice)	Episode: "The Race to Tuliza"

=== Video games ===
Year	Title	Role	Notes	Source
2002	Hot Wheels Velocity X	Sparky		
2003	Barbie Horse Adventures: Mystery Ride	Barbie		
2004	Barbie as the Princess and the Pauper	Princess Anneliese, Erika		
2004	EverQuest II	Entertainer Faedaen, Yda Sindlefop, Annia Velittle, Lollia Parresius, Miala, Listatania Vainederian, Rebeka Lori, Kirsteh the Witch, Kylanith, Alamara Luthanyia, Nithaask Syrthiss, Daryann Stormrider, Yarana D'Ven, Chuggle, Selwyn Oakheart, Ezria		
2005	Ape Escape 3	Yumi, Monkey Pink (singing voice only)	English dub	
2005	Spyro: A Hero's Tail	Lily the Mermaid, The Ice Princess, Peggy the Penguin, Fairies		
2006	Saints Row	Stilwater's Residents		
2006	Tony Hawk's Project 8	Additional Voices		
2006	The Sopranos: Road to Respect	Additional Voices		
2007	Mass Effect	Emily Wong, Alliance Marine, Asari Attendant, Asari Patron, Biotic Cultist, Colonist, Insane Scientist		
2008	Saints Row 2	Additional Voices		
2009	Cloudy with a Chance of Meatballs	Sam Sparks		
2009	Final Fantasy XIII	Lebreau	English dub	
2010	Mass Effect 2	Emily Wong, Hallia, Hermia, Quarian Slave		
2011	Shadows of the Damned	Demons		
2011	Final Fantasy XIII-2	Lebreau	English dub	
2015	Mortal Kombat X	Additional Voices		
