= Jonny Quest vs. The Cyber Insects =

1995 television film

- Home video release cover art
- Genre: Action; Adventure; Comedy
- Teleplay by: David Bennett Carren; J. Larry Carroll
- Story by: Mario Piluso
- Directed by: Mario Piluso
- Voices of: Don Messick; Granville Van Dusen; Héctor Elizondo; Jeffrey Tambor; Tim Matheson; Kevin Smets; Anndi McAfee; Theresa Saldana; Victor Love; Robert Ito; Olivia White
- Composers: Thomas Chase Jones; Steve Rucker
- Country of origin: United States

Production
- Executive producers: William Hanna; Joseph Barbera; Buzz Potamkin
- Producer: Mario Piluso
- Running time: 90 minutes
- Production companies: Hanna-Barbera Cartoons; Fil-Cartoons

Original release
- Network: TNT
- Release: November 19, 1995

Jonny Quest vs. The Cyber Insects (also known as Jonny's Global Impact) is an animated made-for-television film made by Hanna-Barbera. It premiered on November 19, 1995 on TNT, and was the final iteration of the classic Jonny Quest franchise. The film was a follow-up to the series The New Adventures of Jonny Quest (1986–87), with the same actors voicing Dr. Quest (Don Messick) and Race Bannon (Granville Van Dusen), and was made as part of a "Year of Jonny Quest". This was Don Messick's last time voicing Dr. Quest in the Jonny Quest series. Jonny's original voice actor, Tim Matheson, returned as the voice of 4-DAC. The plot featured "creepy cyberbugs, techno-speak and computer-assisted info wars, all amidst good old-fashioned melodramatic evil." with a teleplay by David Bennett Carren and J. Larry Carroll.

In addition to the original character line-up, this story also features Race's daughter Jessie Bannon, introduced in Jonny's Golden Quest (1993) and voiced once again by Anndi McAfee. The Atlanta Journal-Constitution declared Jessie to be "no 'icky girl'...Not only does she save Jonny's life when disturbingly large fire ants attack, but she also teaches him patience." A test screening of Cyber Insects to 30- to 35-year-old males revealed that though some questioned her addition, most "understood that just like the [original] series, [the update] is a reflection of its times." The Hollywood Reporter's critic enjoyed some sparkling moments of dialogue in the teleplay, but criticized the film's pacing and the repetitiveness of the "overwrought emotional atmosphere" created by the threatened destruction of civilization. The reviewer remarked that Héctor Elizondo and Jeffrey Tambor stole the show with "inimitable style" in voice acting, while animation directors Marlene May and Ron Myrick "brilliantly created two visually intense worlds" with "fantastic" animation. The film is dedicated to the memory of Doug Wildey, the creator of Jonny Quest, who died in 1994 (one year after the USA Network premiere of Jonny's Golden Quest).

== Plot ==
Jonny Quest and Hadji Singh are fleeing from a seemingly hostile tribe of natives in the Orinoco in South America. After evading both the tribe and various jungle predators, including some ferocious alligators, the two enter a native village. Their goal is to steal a sacred sapphire, seemingly unguarded. Hadji points out that it is too easy, but Jonny impulsively attempts to take the jewel, and the two boys are taken prisoner by the tribe who have lain in wait. At this point, Chief Atacama appears along with Jonny's father Dr. Benton Quest, Race Bannon and the Quests' dog, Bandit, revealing the entire thing to have been an Orinoquian test of manhood. One which Jonny has failed.

Later, Jonny confides in Chief Atacama, who reveals he failed because he didn't listen to his friend, Hadji. Jonny reveals he is uncertain he can measure up his world-famous scientist father, and Atacama tells him if he follows the correct path he will attain his goal. Suddenly a violent storm rocks the region. Dr. Quest is contacted by Commander Harris from the organization Intelligence 1, who reveals the bizarre weather is happening all over Earth and seeks his assistance in discovering its origin. The Quests return to their South American base where Race's daughter Jessie rubs Jonny the wrong way due to his failing the Orinoquian test. Jonny's personal robot 4-DAC, is also introduced. 4-DAC assists Quest in determining the origin of the storms is somewhere in space, likely a satellite of some sort.

Armed with this information, Benton opts to go and visit his colleague Dr. Eve Belage, who works on Quest Station, a research platform in Earth's orbit. He takes 4-DAC with him. Out in the jungle, a ship crashlands and disgorges a group of cybernetic insects, who use a sonic device of some kind to induce a swarm of ants to attack the Quest compound in an effort to prevent Benton's ship, Quest Shuttle 1, from launching. However Jonny plays a recording of Chief Atacama's flute music, which drives the ants off, and Quest Shuttle 1 launches without incident. Benton and 4-DAC arrive and meet with Eve, who gives them a tour of the station, which Benton helped create and fund.

Elsewhere, it is revealed that the Quests' old enemy Dr. Zin is behind both the weather phenomenon and the gigantic insects. He is assisted by several numbered technicians: 425, 426 and 427. Blaming 425 for the ants' failure, Zin has him killed and promotes 426 in his place. Back on Earth, Jonny impulsively goes to investigate the source of the ants and takes Hadji and Jessie with him, without asking Race first. His brash behavior nearly gets the three killed when they encounter the insects. Race manages to shoot one's arm off, and they take it back to the compound for analysis. Aboard Quest Station, 4-DAC is brought under Dr. Zin's remote control using a computer virus. 4-DAC uploads all of Quest Station's files to Zin's computer, including Dr. Belage's research into prehistoric assassin bugs.

Needing the assassin bugs for his own work, Zin captures the entire space station using his cloaked asteroid base. He has Benton and Eve brought to him. The remaining scientists are kept imprisoned aboard Quest Station. After losing contact with his father, Jonny, accompanied by Race, Hadji, Jessie and Bandit, takes Quest Shuttle 2 into space to find them. The group remains in contact with Commander Harris and Intelligence 1 with a video link. Aboard the asteroid, Zin explains he plans to weaken Earth using his weather-changing satellites before unleashing his cyber insects upon it. Having no further use for 4-DAC, he has the robot dumped into a vat of ethynol before using Eve's research to begin growing a giant mutated assassin bug inside of a vat. When Quest Shuttle 2 appears on their radar, he orders 426 and 427 to shoot the ship down with an ion cannon despite Benton's pleas.

426 refuses, telling Zin doing so would give away their position. Zin admits she is right but then drops her through a trapdoor for questioning him, and promotes 427. He has Benton and Eve taken to a holding cell in a giant honeycomb-like structure. On Quest Shuttle 2, Jonny uses his laptop to locate 4-DAC, who he remotely links with. The computer virus is cleaned up using anti-virus software, and 4-DAC fills the group in on what has happened so far after extracting himself from the ethynol vat. He finds and frees Benton and Eve and the three begin searching for a way out. When Jonny, desperate to save his father, flies Quest Shuttle 2 near the asteroid again, Zin has 427 send out fighters piloted by his cyber insects to destroy them. During the attack, Race is injured and thought dead.

After learning of Benton and Eve's escape, Zin executes 427 by freezing him to death and shatters his frozen body to pieces. He has the insects find the two. They are swiftly recaptured despite 4-DAC's attempt to distract the insects. Shot and damaged, the robot is dumped down a trash chute. Zin reveals his presence to Intelligence 1, uncloaking the asteroid, and tells Commander Harris all of Earth must surrender to him. Back on Quest Shuttle 2, Race is revived. Jonny blames himself for almost getting Race killed, but is told by Hadji and Jessie that part of growing up is making mistakes and learning from them. He agrees to assist them in getting aboard the asteroid. Zin, intending to upload all of Benton and Eve's memories into his computer, hooks the two up to a brain-scanning machine before he is distracted by Quest Shuttle 2's attack. He destroys it using the ion cannon, much to Benton's horror.

Unknown to him however ship was empty. The group infiltrates the base using a pair of small shuttecraft called Weasels, and Jonny finds 4-DAC, whose body is damaged beyond repair, however his CPU remains intact, and so Jonny uploads him into his laptop, along with the computer virus, inactive but still present, which he intends to use against Zin's computer. In the meantime, Zin's assassin bug, which he calls an "Assassinoid," finishes growing. Zin tells it to go and attack the intruders. Quest Team's first encounter with the Assassinoid has it getting frozen and shattered when Race shoots it, and Bandit grabs a piece. The other pieces thaw and regrow into more Assassinoids as the group finds Quest Station in the hangar and take refuge aboard, finding and freeing the captive scientists.

Eve's assistant Mylana cryogenically freezes the piece of Assassinoid Bandit grabbed, and then Jonny and Race fight their way past the insects to reach Zin's unoccupied control room. They learn from 4-DAC that the only way to kill the insects is a nuclear bomb or a sufficiently large, fiery explosion. They open the hangar doors, allowing Quest Station to be sucked harmlessly back out into outer space. Jonny and 4-DAC upload Zin's own virus into his computer, bringing it under 4-DAC's control. Benton and Eve are freed, allowing Jonny to rescue them. Zin flees. Jonny transfers control of the weather satellite to Intelligence 1, and Harris orders it turned against the asteroid base. It begins to be destroyed as Jonny, Benton, Race and Eve try to reach Zin's escape ship, but it is damaged by an Assassinoid. Instead, the four are rescued when Hadji and Jessie arrive flying Quest Shuttle 1 (which was docked on Quest Station). They escape just as the base explodes.

Back on Earth, Jonny and Hadji retake the Orinoquian test of manhood and passes, making both Benton and Chief Atacama proud; Jonny then beckons Jessie into the circle since she's earn the right to be within it too. 4-DAC has also been restored to a duplicate robot body. Meanwhile, in space, Eve is keeping the piece of Assassonoid that Mylana froze in her lab aboard Quest Station, as she and Mylana tend to the station's onboard garden, which is revealed to be named E.D.E.N. ("Environmental Diversity Experimental Nucleus"). Not far away, it is revealed that Dr. Zin made it to a different escape ship and has survived...

== Cast ==
- Kevin Smets - Jonny Quest
- Don Messick - Dr. Benton Quest, Bandit
- Granville Van Dusen - Race Bannon
- Rob Paulsen - Hadji, 425
- Anndi McAfee - Jessie Bannon
- Jeffrey Tambor - Dr. Zin
- Theresa Saldana - Dr. Eve Belage
- Tim Matheson - 4-DAC
- Héctor Elizondo - Chief Atacama

=== Additional voices ===
- Victor Love - Commander Harris
- Robert Ito - 427
- Olivia White - 426

== Production ==
The film is produced in association with Hanna-Barbera's overseas subsidiary, Fil-Cartoons in Manila, Philippines, with the animation work being handled by production executive Bill Dennis and overseas animation director Chris Cuddington, a former animator from Hanna-Barbera's defunct Australian studio in Sydney, New South Wales.

== Home media ==
On March 19, 1996, Turner Home Entertainment released the film on VHS in the Cartoon Network Video line.

On August 9, 2011, Warner Home Video released Jonny Quest vs. The Cyber Insects on DVD in region 1 via their Warner Archive Collection. This is a Manufacture-on-Demand (MOD) release, available exclusively through Warner's online store and only in the U.S.

The film was released on Blu-ray on September 24, 2024 as part of a double feature with Jonny's Golden Quest.
