= Granville Van Dusen =

American stage, screen, and voice actor (born 1944)

Granville Van Dusen (born March 16, 1944, in Grand Rapids, Minnesota) is an American stage, screen, and voice actor who portrayed Race Bannon in the 1986 television series The New Adventures of Jonny Quest, Jonny's Golden Quest, Jonny Quest vs. The Cyber Insects, and two episodes of The Real Adventures of Jonny Quest.

== Other acting credits ==
Van Dusen portrayed the 16th president of the United States for 25 years in the one-man play, The Memoirs of Abraham Lincoln. His 1992 performance in Wausau, Wisconsin, aired by Wisconsin Public Television and part of its archives, drew a standing ovation and his depiction of Lincoln is regarded among his best work stage acting. He appeared on CBS daytime soap opera The Young and the Restless and ABC's Port Charles. He was also the second actor to portray attorney Walter Telford on the Canadian soap opera, High Hopes. He also appeared in the sitcom Soap as a doctor taking care of, and ultimately falling for, Jessica Tate (portrayed by Katherine Helmond). He also appeared in many TV series such as Kojak; The Bionic Woman; CHiPs; Three's Company; Matlock; Diagnosis: Murder; Walker, Texas Ranger; Barnaby Jones; Dr. Quinn, Medicine Woman; Rhoda; The Eddie Capra Mysteries; Magnum, P.I.; Lois & Clark: The New Adventures of Superman; and The West Wing.

== Filmography ==
=== Film ===
Year	Title	Role	Notes
1971	The Statue	Chuck	
1972	It Ain't Easy	Paul	
1975	Hearts of the West	WWI Pilot	
2000	Aladdin and the Adventure of All Time	Voice	Direct-to-video
2012	Smoke Screen	Robert Brown	

=== Television ===
Year	Title	Role	Notes
1974	Dr. Max	Dr. John Poole	Television film
1974	Ironside	Doctor	Episode: "Raise the Devil: Part 2"
1974	The Waltons	Mr. Andrews	Episode: "The Book"
1974, 1976	Harry O	Coleman / Fred Lassiter	2 episodes
1975	A Cry for Help	Brother Stephen Tyler	Television film
1975	McCloud	Chuck Donnells	Episode: "Sharks!"
1975	Someone I Touched	John	Television film
1975	Baretta	George Parsons	Episode: "This Ain't My Bag"
1975	Switch	Phil Simon	Episode: "Stung from Beyond"
1975	The Night That Panicked America	Carl Phillips	Television film
1976	Dynasty	Creed Vauclose	Television film
1977	The Bionic Woman	Darwin Jones	Episode: "Biofeedback"
1977	World of Darkness	Paul Taylor	Television film
1977	The War Between the Tates	Sanford Finkelstein	Television film
1977	Kojak	Fred Toomey	Episode: "Tears for All Who Loved Her"
1977, 1978	Barnaby Jones	Joe Bannock / R. Ed Dunslay	2 episodes
1978	Breaking Up	Tom Hammil	Television film
1978	The World Beyond	Paul Taylor	Television film
1978	Dr. Scorpion	Terry Batliner	Television film
1978	Love's Dark Ride	Tom Scott	Television film
1978	Escapade	Joshua Rand	Television film
1978	The Eddie Capra Mysteries	Dr. Gatling	Episode: "Dirge for a Dead Dachshund"
1978	Greatest Heroes of the Bible	Joshua	Episode: "The Ten Commandments"
1978	Rhoda	Doug Korman	Episode: "The Date in the Iron Mask"
1979	Transplant	Dr. Kroner	Television film
1979	Quincy, M.E.	Moyer / Raymond Morrison	2 episodes
1979	CHiPs	Lieutenant Harold Bates	Episode: "The Watch Commander"
1979	High Midnight	Lt. Ellis	Television film
1980	Paris	Dirk Chase	Episode: "The Price Is Right"
1980	Stone	Gilardy	Episode: "Deep Sleeper"
1980	The Stockard Channing Show	Spencer Farrell	Episode: "Advise and Consume"
1980	Soap	Dr. Hill	5 episodes
1980	The Wild and the Free	Raif	Television film
1980	It's a Living	Frank Ryan	Episode: "The Lois Affair"
1981	Madame X	Clay Richardson	Television film
1982	This Is Kate Bennett...	Tim Maxwell	Television film
1982	The Astronauts	Captain Roger Canfield	Television film
1982	Hotline	Justin Price	Television film
1983	Three's Company	Ray Martin	Episode: "Breaking Up Is Hard to Do"
1983	It Takes Two	Harry Rice	Episode: "The Choice"
1983	Sutters Bay	Jeff Hamner	Television film
1983	Allison Sydney Harrison	Walt Spencer	Television film
1984, 1988	Hotel	Lee Jordan / Biff Henry	2 episodes
1985	A Death in California	Richard Morgan	Episode #1.1
1985	Magnum, P.I.	Clyde Daltrey	Episode: "The Hotel Dick"
1986	Hill Street Blues	Graham Wells	3 episodes
1986	Murder, She Wrote	Congressman Brad Gardner	Episode: "The Perfect Foil"
1986	Moonlighting	Alan Margolese	Episode: "Funeral for a Door Nail"
1986–1987	The New Adventures of Jonny Quest	Race Bannon	13 episodes
1987	Karen's Song	Zach Matthews	3 episodes
1987	Highway to Heaven	Bob Bailey	Episode: "I Was a Middle Aged Werewolf"
1987	Mr. Belvedere	Doug Metcalf	Episode: "Marsha's Job"
1987	Matlock	Paul J. Bartel	Episode: "The Network"
1988	Family Ties	Mr. Carter	Episode: "Read It and Weep: Part 2"
1989	Father Dowling Mysteries	Carter	Episode: "The Man Who Came to Dinner Mystery"
1989	The People Next Door	Neal Ferrall	Episode: "Dream Date"
1990	Hunter	Eddie Sanders	Episode: "Broken Dreams"
1990	The Rose and the Jackal	Tom	Television film
1990	Doogie Howser, M.D.	Dr. Johnathan Reardon	Episode: "Oh Very Young"
1992	The Boys of Twilight	N/A	Episode: "Pilot"
1993	FBI: The Untold Stories	Henry Vance	Episode: "Kill for Love"
1993	Jonny's Golden Quest	'Race' Bannon	Television film; voice
1993, 2000	Diagnosis: Murder	Defense Attorney McNamara / Herb Morton	2 episodes
1994	Silk Stalkings	Paul Reicher	Episode: "Ghosts of the Past"
1994	Sweet Justice	Jude Lattimore	Episode: "Story of My Life"
1995	Melrose Place	Dr. Steele	Episode: "Breakfast at Tiffany's, Dinner at Eight"
1995	Freakazoid!	Dash O'Pepper	Episode: "Candle Jack/Toby Danger in Doomsday Bet/The Lobe"
1995	Jonny Quest vs. The Cyber Insects	'Race' Bannon	Television film; voice
1995	Sisters	Bryce Hayden	Episode: "Sleeping Beauty"
1996	Space: Above and Beyond	General Weirick	Episode: "Sugar Dirt"
1996	One West Waikiki	Morton Boland	Episode: "Allergic to Golf"
1996	Lois & Clark: The New Adventures of Superman	D.A. Michael Clemmons	2 episodes
1996	The Real Adventures of Jonny Quest	Roger T. 'Race' Bannon / Race Bannon	6 episodes
1997	Aaahh!!! Real Monsters	Newsreel Announcer / Gentleman	Episode: "Nuclear and Present Danger/Loch Ness Mess"
1997–2001	The Young and the Restless	Keith Dennison	51 episodes
1998	Dr. Quinn, Medicine Woman	Senator Dinston	Episode: "Seeds of Doubt"
1998	Suddenly Susan	Alan Piper	Episode: "Daddy Piper"
1998	You Lucky Dog	Mr. Fister	Television film
1998	Buddy Faro	Jackie Conklin	Episode: "Pilot"
1998	Walker, Texas Ranger	Neal Banyon	Episode: "Second Chance"
1999	Sliders	Keeper Abraham	Episode: "The Great Work"
1999	Port Charles	David Bordisso	102 episodes
2000	Zoe, Duncan, Jack and Jane	Heintz	Episode: "Crossing the Line"
2000–2001	Judging Amy	Judge Clarence Faraday	4 episodes
2002	Gilmore Girls	Darren Springsteen	Episode: "Application Anxiety"
2003	The West Wing	Assistant Secretary of State for Public Affairs Bryce Lilly	Episode: "Inauguration: Part 1"
2003, 2004	Star Trek: Enterprise	Andorian General / Klingon Magistrate	2 episodes

=== Video games ===
Year	Title	Role	Notes
2002	Dead to Rights	Fahook Ubduhl / Weightlifter	Voice
2003	Wolfenstein: Enemy Territory	Allied Commander	Voice
2004	Metal Gear Solid: The Twin Snakes	Genome Soldier Leader	Voice
2007	Enemy Territory: Quake Wars	GDF High Command	Voice
