= Jonny Quest: Cover-Up at Roswell =

1996 video game

- Cover art
- Developer: Virgin Sound and Vision
- Publishers: Virgin Sound and Vision
- Platforms: Windows, Windows 3.x, Mac OS
- Release: August 1996
- Genre: Adventure
- Mode: Single-player

Jonny Quest: Cover-Up at Roswell is a point-and-click adventure computer game released by Virgin Sound and Vision in August 1996. Based on the series The Real Adventures of Jonny Quest, the player controls Jonny Quest, Hadji Singh, and Jessie Bannon as they recover alien artifacts that have fallen to Earth and navigate a government cover-up of the situation.

== Gameplay ==
Gameplay consists of clicking areas on images of locations—whether the Serengeti plains or Manhattan—to navigate paths in search of the objects. Occasionally, players encounter mini games, such as the task of guiding a diving bell away from rocks or shooting rats with a slingshot. Though characters appear on screen, there is no dynamic movement save for mini games. Allowing access to personal and government files at two points in the game, Roswell contains a vehicle guide to Real Adventures and several in-universe emails. These communications range from dossiers on the Quest team to a demand from a restaurant owner that Race reimburse him for damages caused when the bodyguard mistook a busboy for a criminal mastermind.

== Plot ==
When an alien ship crashes down to Earth in Roswell, New Mexico, the Men in Black and leader General Tyler begin to conceal the incident from the public. At the Quest Compound, the Questworld virtual reality system crashes. Once the system is restored, Dr. Quest receives an email from a colleague describing the Roswell crash site and containing satellite footage of the falling ship ejecting several objects. The Quests use the Hologlobe—an advanced virtual locator in the Questworld—to find that two of the objects landed in ruins near Iquitos, Peru and in New York City's Central Park; the Quests travel to both locations and retrieve the artifacts. While in Manhattan, they see a TV news report by reporter Vince Vance discussing a potential alien invasion. They find the third artifact in Tanzania, being attacked by elephant poachers in the process.

The Quests travel to Ancestral Puebloan ruins in Lake Powell, Utah and obtain the next artifact. They are ambushed by the Men in Black who, after tailing the group through Arizona, detain Hadji, Benton, and Race. Jonny, Jessie, and Bandit hijack a small aircraft and fly to where the rest of the team is being held. The Men in Black demand the artifact in exchange for the release of the team. Jonny gives them a fuel tester, telling them it is the artifact. The regrouped team bring their Questor ship and Sea Slug submersible to retrieve the final artifact, located in the Devil's Triangle. Back at their headquarters, they scan an artifact, discovering traces of organic alien matter. They then attempt to hack into federal computers in Washington, D.C. via the Questworld; nemesis Jeremiah Surd tries to stop them. The Quests succeed and find records indicating that Surd posed as news reporter Vince Vance in an attempt to take the artifacts for himself. They discover the alien from the crash-landed ship is being held in the basement of The Pentagon. They travel to D.C. and infiltrate The Pentagon using a droid, successfully retrieving the alien after being chased by General Tyler. The Quests assist the alien in returning to outer space and leave D.C.

== Development ==
Virgin created the game on a budget of $1 million, initially titling it Escape from Quest World. Developers recycled fifty minutes of footage and art from six season one episodes to construct a new story concerning alien artifacts and an alien's liberation from an autopsy at The Pentagon. Virgin handled all marketing, sales, and distribution, while Turner helped cross-promote the game. Turner New Media announced that Virgin's "non-violent adventure games suitable for pre-teen girls and boys, fits...our vision of what family entertainment should be." Virgin designed certain segments in 3D and included special Chromatek plastic viewing glasses with game copies. Footage voices were dubbed over by Michael Banyaer as Hadji, Charles Howerton as Dr. Quest, and the season two cast. Virgin hoped the game would provide 20–25 hours of game play for adults and 80-100 for children.

== Reception ==
The game's music featured a "high-intensity orchestral sound" prone to monotony. One reviewer cited a lack of replay value and different modes of difficulty as weaknesses, but concluded that Roswell offered "good entertainment and variety". Critics were divided over the puzzles' difficulty, naming it both "ingenious" and "elementary". Peter Scisco of ComputerLife wrote that his kids had difficulty with the small mouse cursors, and criticized some of the puzzles for relying on "reflexes, not logical thinking." FamilyPC's testers agreed that the early puzzles were difficult but offered a sense of achievement. Entertainment Weekly's reviewer found the challenges too easy, considering them unimaginative "Pac-Man rip-offs and dopey jigsaws," and rated the game B+. Scisco appreciated the nonviolent content and the inclusion of Jessie's strong female character, but named the extraterrestrial story "too familiar". The Sydney Morning Herald warned against buying the game for children "scared easily by baddies," but recommended it for children who would enjoy mental challenges. A critic for USA Today warned that players who aren't fans of the show may find waiting through the many video clips and cut scenes tedious. A reviewer for the New York Daily News wrote that New York City was depicted as "teeming with gangs of wilding youths and set in a bleak, roach-infested urban blight of a stereotype most New Yorkers might find grossly exaggerated; maybe even insulting." The reviewer considered some of the puzzles too difficult for children, but forecast teenage enjoyment. Though he enjoyed using the game's three-dimensional glasses, he suffered a headache after quitting the game. After navigating the first few puzzles, a critic for The Age asked, "Who said this was just for kids?"
