= The New Adventures of Jonny Quest =

- Genre: Animation; Adventure; Action; Sci-fi
- Based on: Characters by Doug Wildey
- Directed by: Oscar Dufau; Don Lusk; Rudy Zamora
- Starring: Scott Menville; Granville Van Dusen; Rob Paulsen; Vic Perrin; Don Messick; Jeffrey Tambor
- Theme music composer: Hoyt Curtin
- Composer: Hoyt Curtin
- Country of origin: United States
- No. of episodes: 13

Production
- Executive producers: William Hanna; Joseph Barbera
- Producer: Berny Wolf
- Running time: 22 minutes
- Production company: Hanna-Barbera Productions (Note: Animation outsourced to Wang Film Productions.)

Original release
- Network: Syndication
- Release: September 14, 1986 – March 1, 1987

Related
- The Adventures of Jonny Quest; Jonny's Golden Quest

The New Adventures of Jonny Quest is an American animated series produced by Hanna-Barbera Productions, and a continuation of the 1964–65 television series Jonny Quest. It debuted in 1986 as part of The Funtastic World of Hanna-Barbera syndication package, being the seventh and final Hanna-Barbera cartoon of the four and a half weekday/weekend morning line-up. While it is a continuation, the series can be seen as the second season to the original series.

== Plot ==
This series features Dr. Quest and his group as they go on adventures while thwarting different villains, such as the mad scientist Dr. Zin. Some episodes had a stone man named Hardrock as the Quest family's ally.

== Episodes ==
No.	Title	Written by	Original release date
1	"Peril of the Reptilian"	Alan Burnett	September 14, 1986
Mysterious attacks on military installations in the South Pacific leads Dr. Quest to the evil biochemist Dr. Phorbus and his henchmen Simon and Patch on an uncharted island. Dr. Phorbus has engineered prehistoric hybrid dinosaurs from the DNA harvested from dinosaur bones as well creating as mutant dinosaur-like "reptile-men" with help from the DNA harvested from human bones so that he can sell them to foreign powers.
2	"Nightmares of Steel"	Mark Zaslove	September 21, 1986
Sheik Abu Saddi asks Dr. Quest for help in dealing with a group of vicious marauders called the Night Raiders. They alongside their leader Baksheesh have developed robot horses stolen from the sheik so that they can use them in their plot to kill the sheik.
3	"Aliens Among Us"	John Loy	September 28, 1986
A matter transportation device invented by Dr. Quest is stolen by apparent aliens. Though this was all part of a plan by Dr. Zin to steal the matter transportation device.
4	"Deadly Junket"	David Schwartz	October 5, 1986
The famous Dr. Bradshaw's daughter Jessie asks the Quest party to help her find her father, kidnapped by Dr. Zin to work on an anti-missile system. Note: This episode's storyline was cannibalized as a subplot for Jonny's Golden Quest.
5	"Forty Fathoms Into Yesterday"	Glenn Leopold	October 12, 1986
After being thrown back into the year 1944, the Quests discover that a time machine discovered aboard a submarine is being used by a German scientist named Dr. Wolfgang Kruger. He and his henchman Hans plan to change the course of history.
6	"Vikong Lives"	Charles M. Howell, IV	October 19, 1986
While in the arctic, the Quests discover an ape-like creature frozen in the ice. Their financial backer Mr. Peters wants the creature for his own plans.
7	"The Monolith Man"	Mark Edens	November 2, 1986
Dr. Benton Quest discovers a stone man named Hardrock in the underground ruins who becomes the target of Zartan and Scorpio. After the villains are defeated, Hardrock joins the Quest team.
8	"Secret of the Clay Warriors"	Steve DeKorte	November 9, 1986
The Quests and Hardrock receive a plea for help from an archaeologist friend named Dr. Yang. They arrive to help end the reign of terror by ghostly clay warriors led by Chin.
9	"Warlord of the Sky"	Mark Zaslove	November 16, 1986
An evil scientist named Maximilian Dragna plans to rule the skies with an incredible flying craft called the Dreadnought.
10	"The Scourge of Skyborg"	Donald F. Glut	November 23, 1986
Race tests a new computerized autopilot called CAP and runs afoul of Skyborg. He was originally Race's old friend Judd Harmon who was turned into a cyborg following an accident. Now corrupted by his cybernetic implants, Skyborg pits Race against CAP in a battle to win the Quests freedom.
11	"Temple of Gloom"	Eric Lewald	December 7, 1986
Hadji's old teacher Rijiv is being forced by the evil Dibrana and her henchman Moog to disrupt a peace conference between India and an unnamed country.
12	"Creeping Unknown"	David Schwartz	December 14, 1986
A monster made of plants terrorizes an area near a swamp. It is abducting people so that it and the scientist Mr. Trudge can turn people into plants with Mr. Trudge being an earlier experiment. The Quests learn of the plant monster and work to find a way to defeat it while rescuing the captives.
13	"Skulduggery"	Gary Warne	March 1, 1987
Dr. Zin is behind a plan to use tokens of power to gain mastery over the world.

== Voice cast ==
=== Main ===
- Scott Menville as Jonathan "Jonny" Quest
- Don Messick as Dr. Benton C. Quest, Bandit
- Rob Paulsen as Hadji Singh
- Vic Perrin as Dr. Zin (3 episodes)
- Jeffrey Tambor as Hardrock (7 episodes)
- Granville Van Dusen as Roger T. "Race" Bannon

=== Additional cast ===
- René Auberjonois as Mr. Peters (in "Vikong Lives")
- Michael Bell as Dr. Phorbus (in "Peril of the Reptilian"), Radar Station Guard #1 (in "Peril of the Reptilian")
- Candy Brown
- Howard Caine
- Roger C. Carmel as Baksheesh (in "Nightmare in Steel")
- Peter Cullen as Patch (in "Peril of the Reptilian")
- Jennifer Darling
- Barry Dennen
- Richard Erdman
- Bernard Erhard
- Dick Gautier
- Ernest Harada
- Dorian Harewood
- Darryl Hickman
- Georgi Irene as Jessie Bradshaw (in "Deadly Junket")
- Aron Kincaid
- Ruth Kobart
- Keye Luke as Fake Elder (in "Secret of the Clay Warriors")
- Allan Lurie
- Scott McGowan
- Soon-Tek Oh - Dr. Yeng (in "Secret of the Clay Warriors")
- Andre Stojka as Simon (in "Peril of the Reptilian")
- George Takei as Chin (in "Secret of the Clay Warriors")
- Les Tremayne as Sheik Abu Saddi (in "Nightmare in Steel")
- B.J. Ward as CAP (in "The Scourge of Skyborg")
- Frank Welker as Vikong (in "Vikong Lives"), Remy (in "Vikong Lives")
- Stan Wojno
- Keone Young as Radar Station Guard #2 (in "Peril of the Reptilian")

== Production and history ==
In the late 1970s, Hanna-Barbera produced concept art for a new series entitled Young Dr. Quest: The Adventures of Jon Quest, featuring an older Jonny, Hadji, and an adopted Japanese girl. They would be accompanied by pets Bandit II and Oboe (an unspecified species of monkey), and receive support from Benton Quest and Race Bannon at times (with Race having since married Jade). According to Disney historian Jim Korkis, Doug Wildey later pitched the concept as simply named Young Dr. Quest to Joseph Barbera, featuring Jonny as a 22-year old MIT graduate going on adventure with Race and Hadji.

By mid-1983, the edited episodes of the original Jonny Quest series (each episode was missing about five minutes of footage edited for time constraints and content) were part of The Funtastic World's second season lineup, alongside Yogi's Treasure Hunt, Paw Paws and Galtar and the Golden Lance. Thirteen episodes were produced in 1986 to accompany the original in the Funtastic World programming block. These episodes were referred to simply as Jonny Quest on their title cards, and were noticeably less violent and more “kid-friendly” than the 1960s version.

In an interview in the first issue of the Comico: The Comic Company published Jonny Quest Comic book, Joseph Barbera stated since 1984 they had received offers from six different companies interested in licensing Jonny Quest for either a live action prime time television series or feature film. Barbera stated that they'd entered into negotiations several times but turned down every offer but this convinced them that there was interest in a new Jonny Quest series. The intention with the new batch of episodes was to pair them with rebroadcasts of the original series, in the event the new episodes were deemed successful, an order of 26 additional episodes would be produced which along with the original series would bring the total episodes to 65 thereby making the series an attractive package for broadcast syndication. Ultimately, no further episodes were produced beyond the initial 13 episodes.

This was followed by two television films, Jonny's Golden Quest in 1993 and Jonny Quest vs. The Cyber Insects in 1995, with Don Messick, Granville Van Dusen and Rob Paulsen voicing Dr. Quest, Race and Hadji. The 1980s Quest series introduced a new character named Hardrock, an ancient man made of stone. He did not return in later versions of the program.

== Home media ==
On April 8, 2014, Warner Archive released Jonny Quest: The Complete Eighties Adventures on DVD in region 1 as part of their Hanna-Barbera Classic Collection. This is a Manufacture-on-Demand (MOD) release, available exclusively through Warner's online store and Amazon.com.
