= Doug Wildey =

American comics artist

- Photo of Wildey circa Summer 1973
- Born: Douglas Samuel Wildey; May 2, 1922 Yonkers, New York, U.S.
- Died: October 4, 1994 (aged 72) Las Vegas, Nevada, U.S.
- Areas: Penciller, Inker
- Notable works: Jonny Quest; Outlaw Kid

Douglas Samuel Wildey (May 2, 1922 – October 4, 1994) was an American cartoonist and comic book artist best known for originally conceptualizing and co-creating the classic 1964 American animated television series Jonny Quest for Hanna-Barbera Productions.

== Biography ==
=== Early life and career ===
Wildey panel from Atlas Comics' The Outlaw Kid #11 (May 1956).

Wildey was born and raised in Yonkers, New York, adjacent to New York City. He did World War II military service at Naval Air Station Barbers Point in Hawaii, where he began with his artistic talent and creative animation career as a cartoonist for the base newspaper. He recalled his professional start as freelancing for the magazine and comic book company Street & Smith in 1947. Because comic book writer and artist credits were not routinely given during this era, the earliest confirmed Wildey works are the two signed pieces in this publisher's Top Secret #9 (June 1949): a one-page house ad and the 10-page adventure story "Queen in Jeopardy", by an unknown writer.

He went on to draw primarily Western stories for Youthful Magazines comics including Buffalo Bill, Gunsmoke (unrelated to the later television series), and Indian Fighter. He also contributed to the publishers Master Comics, Story Comics, Cross Publications and possibly others, puckishly observing that he'd worked for every publisher except EC, "the good one".

In 1952, Wildey moved, with his whole family—wife Ellen and oldest daughter, Debbie and —to Tucson, Arizona. Two years later, he began a regular stint at Atlas Comics, the 1950s forerunner of Marvel Comics, where he drew dozens of Western stories through 1957, primarily four- to five-page tales in such titles as Frontier Western. His art also appeared in the Atlas horror-fantasy comics Journey into Unknown Worlds, Marvel Tales, Mystery Tales, Mystic, Strange Tales, Uncanny Tales, and others.

Animation historian Ken Quattro favorably describes Wildey's most "noteworthy" Western classic style as the 19-issue Atlas Comics series Outlaw Kid, "his take on the classic Western antihero", in which Wildey had creatively illustrated a three- to four-story arc per comic book issue:

In concept, it was typical of all the Stan Lee-created Kids (Colt, Rawhide, Two-Gun, Ringo, etc.). What set it apart was Wildey's art. . . . The Outlaw Kid was a monthly opportunity for Wildey to hone and develop his burgeoning art skills. Using Outlaw Kid #11 (May 1956) as an example of his work well into the series, the influence of cinema on his work is evident. Though he may have had this influence all along, now it is readily apparent, with panels staged like film scenes. The characters have a realistic, illustrative look to them. . . . Most significantly, his artwork finally had the consistent luster of professionalism. Wildey varied his inking from the fine stroke of an etching to the bold use of solid blacks to attain dramatic chiaroscuro effects.

Much of this work was reprinted by Marvel from 1970 through 1974, exposing Wildey's work to a younger generation.

After an Atlas Comics retrenchment in 1957—during which the company mixed a trove of inventory stories by Wildey and many others with new material for about two to three years—Wildey freelanced on a small number of standalone anthology stories for two other publishers: Harvey Comics, in the science fiction/fantasy titles Alarming Tales #3-5 (Jan.-Sept. 1958), and Black Cat Mystic #62 (March 1958), Hi-School Romance #73 (March 1958) and Warfront #34 (Sept. 1958); and DC Comics, in Tales of the Unexpected #33 & 35 (Nov. 1958, March 1959), House of Secrets #17 (Feb.1959), My Greatest Adventure #28 & 32 (November 1958 & June 1959), and House of Mystery #89 (Aug. 1959). He also later drew the first issue of Dell Comics' TV series spin-off Dr. Kildare (a.k.a. 4 Color #1337, June 1962).

Portion of sample Sunday page of Wildey's proposed comic strip Stretch Bannon. Wildey would use part of the name for a cast character of his animated TV series Jonny Quest.

In either 1959 or 1961 (sources vary) he took over the art for writer Leslie Charteris' long-running New York Herald Tribune Syndicate comic strip The Saint. Some of their strips were inked by Dick Ayers as the deadlines of producing a daily and Sunday strip proved daunting. The strip ended in 1962. Adding credence to the latter date is Wildey spending part of 1960, possibly only a month, penciling his idol Milton Caniff's famed Steve Canyon comic strip and trying unsuccessfully to launch his own syndicated strip.

Two such proposed strips would help provide a character name and some narrative background to Wildey's later animated television series, Jonny Quest. As he described in 1986,

I once tried an automobile comic strip. Because this whole country runs on the automobile economy, right? . . . In my case, my guy was sort of an automobile designer. He raced cars. He had this glamorous European background, and raced on American tracks. I called him Stretch Bannon. . . . Then, later on, I tried another strip about a writer-artist team that traveled the world getting into adventures. The name was Race Dunhill. So I put the Race and the Bannon together and that's where Race Bannon came from.

=== Television Animation Work ===
Following the end of The Saint comic strip in 1962, Wildey found, through an ad in the National Cartoonists Society newsletter, what was initially a one-week television animation job in Los Angeles, California, working under artist Alex Toth on Cambria Productions' 1962 animated series Space Angel. Wildey eventually worked on the animated series for about 12 to 14 weeks, after which, he then recalled and carried on and over in 1986.

I had applied to Universal [Studios] (which was called something else at the time) as sort of a storyboard [artist] / production designer. [Producer] Stanley Kramer's office got interested in my stuff, so I figured, rather than move back to Arizona, where my family lives, maybe I could latch onto Stanley Kramer. [The animation studio] Hanna-Barbera was up the street from there, so I simply crossed the street, went up to Hanna-Barbera, and said, 'Look, I'm an artist' and so forth. A couple of people there had read some of my comic strips and comic books, so they said, 'Come in and see [Joe] Barbera.' The following day, or maybe even the same day, Barbera called me up and said, 'Can you design, in your style, a show [starring the radio drama adventure character] Jack Armstrong?'

Wildey also wrote and drew a presentation, using such magazines as Popular Science, Popular Mechanics, and Science Digest "to project what would be happening 10 years hence", and devising or fancifully updating such devices as a "snowskimmer" and hydrofoils. When Hanna-Barbera could not obtain the rights to Jack Armstrong, the studio had Wildey rework the concept. Wildey "went home and wrote Jonny Quest that night — which was not that tough." For inspiration he drew on Jackie Cooper and Frankie Darrow movies, Milton Caniff's comic strip Terry and the Pirates, and, at the behest of Hanna-Barbera, the James Bond movie Dr. No. Hanna-Barbera refused to give him a "created by" credit, Wildey said in 1986, and he and studio "finally arrived on 'Based on an idea created by', and that was my credit."

The prime-time TV animated series Jonny Quest originally debuted on ABC on September 18, 1964. And as American comics historian Daniel Herman then wrote:

Wildey's designs on Jonny Quest gave the cartoon a distinctive look, with its heavy blacks [i.e. shading and shadow] and its Caniff-inspired characters. . . . The show was an action/adventure story involving the feature's namesake, a young brave and brilliant 11-year-old boy. The cast of characters included Jonny's kid sidekick, named Hadji, Jonny's globetrotting and brilliant scientist dad, Dr. Benton Quest and the groups' handsome bodyguard, secret agent Race Bannon, who looks as if he stepped out of the pages of [Caniff's comic strip] Steve Canyon. . . . The look of Jonny Quest was unlike any other cartoon television show of the time, with its colorful backgrounds, and its focus on the characters with their jet packs, hydrofoils, and lasers. Wildey would work on other animation projects, but it was with his work on Jonny Quest that he reached his widest audience, bringing a comic book sense of design and style to television cartoons.

Although, Wildey did not design the more cartoonishly drawn comic relief pet dog, Bandit, which was otherwise designed by animator Dick Bickenbach.

Wildey then went on to work on several other animated series including Herculoids, Jana of the Jungle, Return to the Planet of the Apes (1975), The Godzilla Power Hour (1978), Mister T (1983), and Chuck Norris: Karate Kommandos (1986). and Centurions (1986).

=== Return to Comics ===
In the mid-1960s, Wildey eventually returned to comic books, drawing stories for the premiere issues of Harvey Comics' Thrill-O-Rama, Unearthly Spectaculars (both October 1965 series) and Double-Dare Adventures (December 1965). Most significantly during this time, he collaborated with writer Gaylord DuBois on Gold Key Comics' licensed series Tarzan when that long-running comic, which had been reprinting stories drawn by Russ Manning, began producing new work beginning with issue #179 (September 1968). The duo's work appeared through issue #187 (September 1969).

After a short hiatus from comic books, broken only by 3 1971 stories for Skywald's black-and-white horror-comics magazines Psycho and Nightmare, plus the Haunted Tank story "The Armored Ark" in DC Comics' G.I. Combat #153 (May 1972), Wildey created the comic strip Ambler, which ran from 1972 to 1975. Syndicated to newspapers by the Chicago Tribune New York News Syndicate, the contemporary strip chronicled the adventures of an itinerant folk musician.

Afterwards, Wildey then returned to comic books to do stories for Archie Comics' horror-humor anthology series Mad House, Gold Key's Mystery Comics Digest, and DC's Our Army at War and Sgt. Rock, among other titles. Returning to his Western roots, he drew the feature "Jonah Hex" in DC's Weird Western Tales #26 (February 1975) and co-created with writer Larry Lieber the feature "Kid Cody, Gunfighter" in Atlas/Seaboard Comics' Western Action #1 (February 1975).

As both writer and comic book artist, Wildey also created his own Western feature, "Rio", that ran in Eclipse Comics' Eclipse Monthly #1-10 (Aug. 1983 - July 1984), and he returned to his most prominent creation that decade with a Jonny Quest comic book series published by Comico. Wildey wrote and drew the stories in Jonny Quest #1 (July 1986) and Jonny Quest Classics #1-3 (May 1987 — July 1987), and provided several covers. Comico also reprinted several of his Rio stories in a June 1987 one-shot, and Wildey produced new Rio stories for Dark Horse Comics' two-issue miniseries Rio at Bay (July 1992 — August 1992).

Wildey's last original comics work was the painted art for the short 8-page Western tale "The End of the Time of Leinard" by writers Faye Perozich and Harlan Ellison in Dark Horse's Harlan Ellison's Dream Corridor Special (January 1995).

=== Death ===
Wildey died of a congenital heart failure in Las Vegas, Nevada, on October 4, 1994. He was around 72 years old at the time of his death. He was surrounded by numerous family members and working colleagues by his side.

== Bibliography ==
In 1971, Jim Vadeboncoeur Jr. published a Wildey portfolio, The Movie Cowboy, consisting of around 26 illustrations sized 12x18 inches. Said historian Quattro, "Wildey had shifted seamlessly between pen and brush, from the finest pen strokes imaginable, to the soft nuances of wash, from the monumental close-up of a grizzled Martin Landau, to the sunny sweetness of 2 women waiting for a stage coach."
