= 1948 in animation =

Events in 1948 in animation.

== Events ==
=== January ===
- January 3: Robert McKimson's Bugs Bunny cartoon Gorilla My Dreams, produced by Warner Bros. Cartoons.
- January 23: Toei Animation is founded.

=== February ===
- February 7: Chuck Jones' Bugs Bunny cartoon A Feather in His Hare premieres, produced by Warner Bros. Cartoons. This short has barely been re-released to this day due to its offensive stereotypes of Native Americans.

=== March ===
- March 5: Jack King's Donald Duck cartoon Drip Dippy Donald premieres, produced by Walt Disney Animation Studios. In the short film, Donald tries to sleep despite a dripping kitchen faucet.
- March 6: Robert McKimson's Porky Pig and Daffy Duck cartoon Daffy Duck Slept Here premieres, produced by Warner Bros. Cartoons.
- March 20: 20th Academy Awards:
  - James Baskett wins an Academy Honorary Award for his role as Uncle Remus in Song of the South, becoming the first African-American actor to win an Oscar.
  - Zip-a-Dee-Doo-Dah from Song of the South, written by Ray Gilbert and composed by Allie Wrubel, wins the Academy Award for Best Original Song.
  - Friz Freleng's Tweetie Pie, produced by Warner Bros. Cartoons and starring Tweety and Sylvester, wins the Academy Award for Best Animated Short (breaking Tom and Jerry's 4-year winning streak).
- Tex Avery's What Price Fleadom premieres, produced by MGM's Cartoon Studio.
- March 27: Friz Freleng's cartoon Back Alley Oproar premieres, produced by Warner Bros. Cartoons, starring Elmer Fudd and Sylvester. It is a remake of Freleng's 1941 short Notes to You, with Elmer replacing Porky Pig and Sylvester replacing the generic cat.

=== April ===
- April 2: Friz Freleng's second Tweety and Sylvester cartoon I Taw a Putty Tat premieres, produced by Warner Bros. Cartoons. It is a complete remake of Frank Tashlin's 1943 short Puss n' Booty.
- April 10: Chuck Jones' Bugs Bunny cartoon Rabbit Punch premieres, produced by Warner Bros. Cartoons.
- April 16: Jack Hannah's Donald Duck cartoon Daddy Duck premieres, produced by Walt Disney Animation Studios.
- April 17: Robert McKimson's Sylvester cartoon Hop, Look and Listen, produced by Warner Bros. Cartoons, premieres which features the debut of Hippety Hopper.

=== May ===
- May 1: Arthur Davis' Porky Pig cartoon Nothing but the Tooth premieres, produced by Warner Bros. Cartoons.
- May 8: Friz Freleng's Bugs Bunny and Yosemite Sam cartoon Buccaneer Bunny premieres, produced by Warner Bros. Cartoons.
- May 15: Tex Avery's Little 'Tinker premieres, produced by MGM's Cartoon Studio.
- May 21: Jack King's Donald Duck cartoon Donald's Dream Voice premieres, produced by Walt Disney Animation Studios. Also starring Daisy Duck.
- May 27: The Walt Disney Company releases Melody Time, directed by Jack Kinney, Clyde Geronimi, Hamilton Luske and Wilfred Jackson.

=== June ===
- June 1: Hanna-Barbera's Tom and Jerry cartoon Kitty Foiled premieres, produced by MGM's Cartoon Studio. This short marks the debut of the character Cuckoo, a canary bird who helps Jerry deal with Tom. It was infamous for its fake gun violence scene with Tom.
- June 12: Friz Freleng's Bugs Bunny and Yosemite Sam cartoon Bugs Bunny Rides Again premieres, produced by Warner Bros. Cartoons.

=== July ===
- July 17: Hanna-Barbera's Tom and Jerry cartoon The Truce Hurts, produced by MGM's Cartoon Studio in which Tom, Jerry, & Spike give up their violent ways and all become friends. Also starring Butch.
- July 24: Chuck Jones' Bugs Bunny cartoon Haredevil Hare premieres, produced by Warner Bros. Cartoons in which Marvin the Martian & his dog K-9 make their debuts.
- July 30: Jack King's Donald Duck cartoon The Trial of Donald Duck premieres, produced by Walt Disney Animation Studios.

=== August ===
- August 7:
  - Chuck Jones' Daffy Duck cartoon You Were Never Duckier premieres, produced by Warner Bros. Cartoons. Also starring Henery Hawk and his father George K. Chickenhawk.
  - Tex Avery's final George and Junior cartoon Half-Pint Pygmy premieres, produced by MGM's Cartoon Studio.
- August 21: Robert McKimson's Bugs Bunny cartoon Hot Cross Bunny premieres, produced by Warner Bros. Cartoons.
- August 27: Jack Hannah's Donald Duck cartoon Inferior Decorator premieres, produced by Walt Disney Animation Studios.

=== September ===
- September 11: Arthur Davis' Porky Pig cartoon The Pest That Came to Dinner premieres, produced by Warner Bros. Cartoons.
- September 18: Hanna-Barbera's Tom and Jerry cartoon Old Rockin' Chair Tom premieres, produced by MGM's Cartoon Studio and also starring Mammy Two Shoes. This short marks the debut of Tom's other alley cat friend Lightning.
- September 25: Friz Freleng's Bugs Bunny cartoon Hare Splitter premieres, produced by Warner Bros. Cartoons.

=== October ===
- October 2: Arthur Davis' cartoon Odor of the Day premieres, produced by Warner Bros. Cartoons. Starring Wellington the Dog & Pepé Le Pew (making his only appearance in Arthur Davis short).
- October 9:
  - Robert McKimson's cartoon The Foghorn Leghorn, produced by Warner Bros. Cartoons, is first released. Starring Foghorn Leghorn, Henery Hawk, & Barnyard Dawg.
  - Tex Avery's Lucky Ducky premieres, produced by MGM's Cartoon Studio.
- October 15: Jack Hannah's Donald Duck cartoon Soup's On premieres, produced by Walt Disney Animation Studios. Also starring Huey, Dewey, and Louie.
- October 23: Robert McKimson's Bugs Bunny cartoon A-Lad-In His Lamp premieres, produced by Warner Bros. Cartoons.
- October 28: Hanna-Barbera's Tom and Jerry cartoon Professor Tom premieres, produced by MGM's Cartoon Studio and also starring Topsy.

=== November ===
- November 5: Jack Hannah's Donald Duck cartoon Three for Breakfast premieres, produced by Walt Disney Animation Studios. Also starring Chip 'n' Dale.
- November 6: Friz Freleng's Sylvester and Elmer Fudd cartoon Kit for Cat premieres, produced by Warner Bros. Cartoons.
- November 20:
  - Arthur Davis' Daffy Duck cartoon The Stupor Salesman premieres, produced by Warner Bros. Cartoons.
  - Tex Avery's The Cat That Hated People premieres, produced by MGM's Cartoon Studio which marks the debut of the character Blackie the Cat.
- November 27: Arthur Davis' Daffy Duck and Porky Pig cartoon Riff Raffy Daffy premieres, produced by Warner Bros. Cartoons.

=== December ===
- December 3: Charles Nichols' Mickey Mouse cartoon Mickey and the Seal, produced by Walt Disney Animation Studios, is first released.
- December 4: Chuck Jones' Bugs Bunny cartoon My Bunny Lies over the Sea premieres, produced by Warner Bros. Cartoons.
- December 11: Hanna-Barbera's Tom and Jerry short Mouse Cleaning premieres, produced by MGM's Cartoon Studio and also starring Mammy Two Shoes.
- December 18: Chuck Jones' cartoon Scaredy Cat premieres, produced by Warner Bros. Cartoons. Starring Porky Pig and Sylvester (whom the latter makes his debut in a Chuck Jones short).
- December 24: Jack Hannah's Donald Duck cartoon Tea for Two Hundred premieres, produced by Walt Disney Animation Studios.

=== Specific date unknown ===
- Walter Lantz Productions closes down. It will be reopened two years later.

== Films released ==
- May 27 - Melody Time (United States)
- November 5 - Water for Fire Fighting (United Kingdom)
- December 27 - Happy Holidays (Spain)

== Births ==
=== January ===
- January 7:
  - Ichirou Mizuki, Japanese singer, lyricist, composer and voice actor (voice acted, wrote and sang music for various anime films and TV series), (d. 2022).
  - Kenny Loggins, American musician (voice of Montage Singer in the Penn Zero: Part-Time Hero episode "Where Dragons Dare", himself in the Archer episode "Archer Vice: Baby Shower" and the Family Guy episodes "Veteran Guy", "Yacht Rocky", and "80's Guy").
- January 14: Carl Weathers, American actor, director and former football linebacker (voice of GNC Water Bottle in Eight Crazy Nights, Kirby in Balto III: Wings of Change, Basketball King and God of Basketball in Regular Show, Combat Carl in the Toy Story franchise, Omnitraxus Prime in Star vs. the Forces of Evil), (d. 2024).
- January 18: M. C. Gainey, American actor (voice of the Captain of the Guards in the Tangled franchise).
- January 22: Robert Alvarez, American animator (Hanna-Barbera, Filmation), storyboard artist (Saturday Supercade, Camp Candy), sheet timer (DIC Entertainment, Visionaries: Knights of the Magical Light, DuckTales the Movie: Treasure of the Lost Lamp, Disney Television Animation, The Mask, Warner Bros. Animation, Cartoon Network Studios, My Life as a Teenage Robot, The Mighty B!), writer (What a Cartoon!) and director (Marvel Productions, Teenage Mutant Ninja Turtles, Hanna-Barbera, Cartoon Network Studios, My Life as a Teenage Robot, Random! Cartoons).
- January 24: Michael Des Barres, English actor and singer (voice of Kano in Mortal Kombat: Defenders of the Realm, Man in the Hole in the Freakazoid! episode "Sewer Rescue", Nostromos in the Batman: The Animated Series episode "Prophecy of Doom").
- January 26: Rumen Petkov, Bulgarian animator, comics artist (Choko & Boko) and director (Johnny Bravo, Dexter's Laboratory, Cow and Chicken, I Am Weasel, The New Woody Woodpecker Show), (d. 2018).
- January 29:
  - Danny Bravo, American former child actor (voice of Hadji in Jonny Quest).
  - Marc Singer, American-Canadian actor (voice of Man-Bat in Batman: The Animated Series, Adam in The Greatest Adventure: Stories from the Bible episode "The Creation", Kirk Manlord in the Duck Dodgers episode "Bonafide Heroes").

=== February ===
- February 5:
  - Christopher Guest, American-British actor, comedian, screenwriter, composer, musician, director and member of Spinal Tap (voice of Chief M'Bulu, Short and Nurse in Tarzoon: Shame of the Jungle, No Lobes in B.C. Rock, Slamfist and Scratch-It in Small Soldiers, Nigel Tufnel in The Simpsons episode "The Otto Show", Umlatt in the Animaniacs episode "King Yakko", Dupey in the Dilbert episode "The Dupey", Stanley in the SpongeBob SquarePants episode "Stanley S. SquarePants").
  - Tom Wilkinson, English actor (voice of Joseph Goebbels in Jackboots on Whitehall, Fox in The Gruffalo and The Gruffalo's Child, Threarah in Watership Down), (d. 2023).
- February 14: Teller, American magician, illusionist, writer, actor, painter and film director (guest starred in the Fetch! with Ruff Ruffman episode "You Can't Teach an Orange Dog New Tricks", voiced himself in The Simpsons episodes "Hello Gutter, Hello Fadder" and "The Great Simpsina", the Futurama episode "Into The Wild Green Yonder", and the Scooby-Doo and Guess Who? episode "The Cursed Cabinet of Professor Madds Markson!").
- February 15:
  - Tino Insana, American actor (voice of Mr. Grouper in Bubble Guppies, Uncle Ted in Bobby's World, Pig in Barnyard and Back at the Barnyard, Bushroot in Darkwing Duck), (d. 2017).
  - Larry DiTillio, American film and television screenwriter (Fat Albert and the Cosby Kids, He-Man and the Masters of the Universe, Beast Wars), (d. 2019).
- February 18: Michel Elias, French actor, comedian and singer (voice of Zösky in Kaput & Zösky, The Turtle in Ratz, Corneil, John and Uncle Rico in Corneil & Bernie, Timothy, Bombo and other various characters in Monster Allergy, various characters in the Oggy and the Cockroaches episode "Chatter Box", dub voice of Papa Smurf and Grouchy Smurf in The Smurfs and the Magic Flute, Cave of Wonders, Gazeem and Achmed in Aladdin, Mr. Hyde, Behemoth and Harlequin in The Nightmare Before Christmas, Jacquimo and Baltringue in Thumbelina, Pumbaa in The Lion King, Owen Burnett in Gargoyles, Inspector Grub, Rigatoni and Cookie in Rayman: The Animated Series, Rufus and Dr. Drakken in Kim Possible, Goblin and Poseidon in Codename: Kids Next Door, The Reporter in Monsters vs. Aliens, Doc in Rango, Brent Mustangburger in Cars 2 and Planes, Zangief in Wreck-It Ralph and Ralph Breaks the Internet, The Director of the Amusement Park in Batman: The Killing Joke, Mr. Burnish in Abominable, Ludwig in The Cuphead Show!).
- February 22: John Ashton, American actor (voice of Instructor in the King of the Hill episode "Pregnant Paws"), (d. 2024).
- February 24: Dennis Waterman, English actor and singer (voice of Toaster in Tube Mice, the title character in The Fiddley Foodle Bird), (d. 2022).
- February 28: Bernadette Peters, American actress and singer (voice of Rita in Animaniacs, Sophie in Anastasia, Angelique in Beauty and the Beast: The Enchanted Christmas).

=== March ===
- March 2: Ralph Schuckett, American keyboardist, songwriter and composer (4Kids Entertainment), (d. 2021).
- March 4: Brian Cummings, American actor (voice of Doctor Mindbender in G.I. Joe: A Real American Hero, Bumblelion in The Wuzzles, Papa Bear in The Berenstain Bears, Doofus Drake in DuckTales, Mr. Hollywood in 2 Stupid Dogs, continued voice of Sir Tuxford in Adventures of the Gummi Bears).
- March 6: Stephen Schwartz, American composer (Walt Disney Animation Studios, The Prince of Egypt).
- March 12: James Taylor, American singer, songwriter and guitarist (voiced himself in The Simpsons episode "Deep Space Homer").
- March 14: Billy Crystal, American actor and comedian (voice of Mike Wazowski in the Monsters, Inc. franchise, Calcifer in Howl's Moving Castle, additional voices in Animalympics).
- March 20: John de Lancie, American actor (voice of Discord in My Little Pony: Friendship Is Magic, Agent Darkbootie in Invader Zim, Brainiac in Justice League Action, Mr. Olsen in Olaf's Frozen Adventure, Mr. Freeze in DC Super Hero Girls, Q in the Star Trek: Lower Decks episode "Veritas", Sinestro in the Duck Dodgers episode "The Green Loontern", continued voice of Dr. Benton Quest in The Real Adventures of Jonny Quest).
- March 25: David Z, American music producer (produced "Stand Out" and "I 2 I" for A Goofy Movie), (d. 2026).
- March 26: Steven Tyler, American singer and member of Aerosmith (voice of Elf Lieutenant and Elf Singer in The Polar Express, Nim Galuu in Epic, Mad Hatter in the Wonder Pets! episode "Adventures in Wonderland", himself in The Simpsons episode "Flaming Moe's").
- March 28: Dianne Wiest, American actress (voice of Lydia Copperbottom in Robots, Iris in My Father's Dragon).
- March 29: Bud Cort, American actor and comedian (voice of Toyman in the DC Animated Universe, Tempest in The Mask: Animated Series, The King in The Little Prince, Josiah Wormwood in the Batman: The Animated Series episode "The Cape and Cowl Conspiracy"), (d. 2026).
- March 31:
  - Al Gore, American politician, environmentalist and 45th vice president of the United States (voiced himself in the Futurama episodes "Anthology of Interest I", "Crimes of the Hot", "Bender's Big Score" and "The Futurama Holiday Spectacular").
  - Rhea Perlman, American actress (voice of Reeka in My Little Pony: The Movie, Rose Johnson in Two Daddies?, Mother Bird in We're Back! A Dinosaur's Story, Nessie in Robot and Monster, Judith in Sing, Cid in Star Wars: The Bad Batch, Ardeth in season 2 of The Critic, Carla Tortelli in The Simpsons episode "Fear of Flying", Agnes in the What's New Scooby-Doo? episode "A Scooby-Doo Halloween", Old Stripper in the American Dad! episode "Finger Lenting Good", Cryptkeeper's Wife, Grandmother and Witch in the Robot Chicken episode "Caffeine-Induced Aneurysm", Golda in the Harley Quinn episode "Being Harley Quinn").

=== April ===
- April 1: Marion Wells, American television writer (Hanna-Barbera, Disney Television Animation, Adventures from the Book of Virtues), (d. 2021).
- April 7: Michael Hirsh, Belgian-born Canadian producer (Cookie Jar Entertainment, DHX Media, co-founder of Nelvana).
- April 10: Angelo Nicotra, Italian voice actor (Italian voice of Mr. Potato Head in the Toy Story franchise, Tim Lockwood in the Cloudy with a Chance of Meatballs franchise, Mr. Garrison in South Park, Reflux in Incredibles 2, El Diablo in The Spongebob Movie: Sponge on the Run, Larry in Epic, Morgan Freeman in Scooby-Doo and Guess Who?, Dr. Zoidberg in Futurama, Frank the Pug in Men in Black: The Series, Herbert in Family Guy, Superintendent Chalmers in The Simpsons, Yondu Udonta in What If...?), (d. 2024).
- April 15: Michael Kamen, American composer, orchestral arranger, orchestral conductor, songwriter and session musician (The Iron Giant), (d. 2003).
- April 16: Jane Aaron, American illustrator and animator (Between the Lions, Sesame Street), (d. 2015).
- April 20: Gregory Itzin, American actor (voice of Dick Tracy, William Adama and Police Officer in the Robot Chicken episode "Rabbits on a Roller Coaster"), (d. 2022).
- April 25: Freda Foh Shen, American actress (voice of Fa Li in Mulan and Mulan II).

=== May ===
- May 3: Chris Mulkey, American actor (voice of Walter Shreeve / Shriek in Batman Beyond).
- May 12: Richard Riehle, American actor (voice of Sheriff Sam Brown in Home on the Range, Bumi in The Legend of Korra, Leo Grant in the Fillmore! episode "Masterstroke of Malevolence", various characters in Axe Cop), (d. 2026).
- May 14:
  - Meg Foster, American actress (voice of Mother Mayhem in Teen Titans: The Judas Contract, Motherboard in Masters of the Universe: Revelation).
  - Walter Olkewicz, American actor (voice of Falcone in Batman: The Animated Series), (d. 2021).
- May 20: Tesshō Genda, Japanese actor (voice of Kurama in Naruto, Emperor Pierrot in Smile PreCure!, Japanese dub voice of Batman in the DC Animated Universe, Optimus Prime in the Transformers franchise, Tigger in the Winnie the Pooh franchise, Bobby in Animaniacs, Bowler Hat Guy in Meet the Robinsons, Foghorn Leghorn in the Looney Tunes franchise, and Kingpin in Spider-Man: Into the Spider-Verse).
- May 21: Jonathan Hyde, Australian-English actor (voice of Walt Strickler in the Tales of Arcadia franchise).

=== June ===
- June 1:
  - Natalya Marchenkova, Ukrainian animator and animation director (Kievnauchfilm).
  - Powers Boothe, American actor (voice of Gorilla Grodd in the DC Animated Universe, Sunder in Ben 10: Alien Force and Ben 10: Ultimate Alien, Dead Justice in the Scooby-Doo! Mystery Incorporated episode of the same name), (d. 2017).
  - Elena Prorokova, Russian animator, art director (Apples Make You Young, The Humpbacked Horse, Magician Bakhram's Heritage, The Last Petal, Butterfly and Tiger, Nazar the Brave, Shakespeare: The Animated Tales) and director (Bird Catcher, A Fairy-Tale About a Stupid Husband, From 9a.M. To 6p.M., The Way Out - A Steam of Consciousness), (d. 2022).
- June 8: Mike Jittlov, American animator (Animato, The Wizard of Speed and Time).
- June 12: Len Wein, American comic book writer (DC Comics, Marvel Comics, Bongo Comics), editor and television writer (The Transformers, Batman: The Animated Series, Marvel Animation, Exosquad, Conan and the Young Warriors, Phantom 2040, G.I. Joe Extreme, DIC Entertainment, Street Fighter, Mainframe Entertainment, Godzilla: The Series, RoboCop: Alpha Commando, Kong: The Animated Series, Kappa Mikey, Ben 10, Beware the Batman, Transformers: Robots in Disguise, co-creator of Swamp Thing), (d. 2017).
- June 19: Phylicia Rashad, American actress, singer and director (voice of Libba Gardner in Soul, Brenda in Little Bill, Dee Dee Tubbs in The Cleveland Show, Jane Goodfellow in the Teenage Mutant Ninja Turtles episode "What's Michelangelo Good For?", The Boss's Wife in The Life & Times of Tim episode "Theo Strikes Back", Lady Fulten in the Happily Ever After: Fairy Tales for Every Child episode "The Princess and the Pauper", Glacia the Ice Witch in the Sofia the First episode "Winter's Gift", May Songbird in The Rocketeer episode "Songbird Soars Again").
- June 28: Kathy Bates, American actress and director (voice of The Sea Hag in Popeye's Voyage: The Quest for Pappy, Miss Dowdy in Christmas Is Here Again, Mrs. Kadoya in When Marnie Was There, The Girls' Mother in the Adventures from the Book of Virtues episode "Respect", Patrol Officer Jane Cooper in the King of the Hill episode "Lupe's Revenge", D.O. Rothy in the American Dad! episode "Manhattan Magical Murder Mystery Tour").

=== July ===
- July 6:
  - Nathalie Baye, French actress (French dub voice of The Queen in The Ant Bully), (d. 2026).
  - Peter Mansbridge, British-born Canadian retired news anchor (voice of Peter Moosebridge in Zootopia).
- July 12:
  - Susan Blu, American actress (voice of Arcee in The Transformers, Flim Flam in The 13 Ghosts of Scooby-Doo, Mary "Stormer" Philips in Jem, Sibella in Scooby-Doo and the Ghoul School and the OK K.O.! Let's Be Heroes episode "Monster Party", Nanny Smurf in The Smurfs, Judge J.B. McBride in BraveStarr, Aimee Hightower in Galaxy High School, Grandma Spankenheimer in Grandma Got Run Over by a Reindeer), and casting director (Warner Bros. Animation, PBS Kids, The Land Before Time, Lost in Oz).
  - Richard Simmons, American fitness personality (voiced himself in the Johnny Bravo episode "T is for Trouble" and the KaBlam! episode "Sasquatch-ercize", Physediphus in Hercules, Coach Salmons in Fish Hooks, Aerobics Instructor in the Rocko's Modern Life episode "No Pain, No Gain"), (d. 2024).
  - Ben Burtt, American sound designer (Pixar, Escape from Planet Earth, Star Wars Forces of Destiny), director, editor, screenwriter, (Star Wars: Droids), and voice actor (voice of the title character in WALL-E).
  - Jay Thomas, American actor, comedian and radio personality (voice of Ares in Hercules, Barry Anger in Teacher's Pet, Brett Morris in American Dad!, Mr. Sludge in the Goof Troop episode "A Goof of the People", Achmed Abjeer in the Duckman episode "The Road to Dendron", Bull Seal in The Wild Thornberrys episode "Tamper Proof Seal"), (d. 2017).
- July 19: Brenda Banks, African-American animator (Ruby-Spears Enterprises, Hanna-Barbera, Looney Tunes, This Is America, Charlie Brown, The Pagemaster, The Simpsons, King of the Hill), (d. 2020).
- July 22:
  - Mariella Trejos, Colombian-Peruvian actress (Latin American dub voice of Ryce Newton in Beethoven), (d. 2023).
  - Otto Waalkes, German actor (dub voice of Mushu in Mulan and Sid in the Ice Age franchise).
- July 28:
  - Georgia Engel, American actress (voice of Love-a-Lot Bear in The Care Bears Movie, Bobbie in the Open Season franchise, Evelyn in Hercules, Willow Song in The Magic of Herself the Elf, Old Woman in the Hey Arnold! episode "Bag of Money", Rose in the Unsupervised episode "Youngbloods"), (d. 2019).
  - Mitch Rochon, American animator (Hanna-Barbera, Heavy Metal, Fire and Ice, The Chipmunk Adventure), director (My Little Pony Tales, Belle's Magical World) and sheet timer (Disney Television Animation, Iznogoud, CatDog, Universal Animation Studios, Clifford's Really Big Movie, LeapFrog, Tutenstein, Avengers Assemble, Central Park), (d. 2021).
- July 30: Jean Reno, French-Spanish actor (voice of Le Frog in Flushed Away, Bushron in Zootopia 2, French dub voice of Mufasa in The Lion King, the title character in Porco Rosso, Vinny in Atlantis: The Lost Empire).

=== August ===
- August 1: Avi Arad, Israeli-American businessman and producer (Marvel Comics).
- August 3: Doc Harris, Canadian radio broadcaster and actor (voice of Grogar in My Little Pony: Friendship Is Magic, Jeke in Green Legend Ran, Captain in Eat-Man '98, Golem in Monster Rancher, Old Guard in the Ninjago episode "The Darkness Comes", narrator of Captain N: The Game Master, The New Adventures of He-Man and the Ocean Productions dub of the Dragon Ball franchise), (d. 2024).
- August 10: Mark Kausler, American animator (Yellow Submarine, Ralph Bakshi, Walt Disney Animation Studios, Warner Bros. Animation, The Thief and the Cobbler, The Brave Little Toaster to the Rescue, The Brave Little Toaster Goes to Mars, Osmosis Jones, The Simpsons, Looney Tunes: Back in Action), writer and storyboard artist (Garfield and Friends, Osmosis Jones, Looney Tunes: Back in Action, Hi Hi Puffy AmiYumi).
- August 13: Jan Gissberg, Swedish cartoonist animator and director (Peter-No-Tail).
- August 19: Toshio Suzuki, Japanese film producer (Studio Ghibli).
- August 20: John Noble, Australian actor (voice of Brainiac in Superman: Unbound, Unicron in Transformers: Prime, Falco in the Fired on Mars episode "Marsiversary").
- August 22: Jackie Berger, Belgian actress (French dub voice of Gizmo in Teen Titans and Teen Titans Go!, Edmund Pevensie in The Lion, the Witch and the Wardrobe, Martin in The Secret of NIMH, Jerry in Tom and Jerry: The Movie, Louis in We're Back! A Dinosaur's Story, Richie Rich in Richie Rich, Michael Darling in Fox's Peter Pan & the Pirates, Pugsley Addams in The Addams Family, Paco in Jackie Chan Adventures, Jimmy Jones and Natalie Tennyson in Ben 10: Ultimate Alien, Eve and Mary Hughes in Fairy Tail), (d. 2025).
- August 27: Robert Remus, American actor and former professional wrestler (voice of Sergeant Slaughter in G.I. Joe, Dr. Military in the Teen Titans Go! episode "Teen Titans Vroom").
- August 29: Phil Mulloy, British animator (Cowboys, Intolerance) (d. 2025).
- August 30:
  - Heidi Guedel Garofalo, American animator (Walt Disney Animation Studios, Sullivan Bluth Studios, The Chipmunk Adventure, Space Jam, Quest for Camelot, The King and I, Futurama), (d. 2010).
  - Lewis Black, American comedian and actor (voice of Anger in the Inside Out franchise, Linnux in Rock Dog, Brain Slug in The Brak Show, Norbert in The Happy Elf, the Deadly Duplicator and Elliot in Harvey Birdman, Attorney at Law, Mr. E in Scooby-Doo! Mystery Incorporated, Spider Bytez/Vic in Teenage Mutant Ninja Turtles, Santa Claus in SpongeBob SquarePants and Kamp Koral: SpongeBob's Under Years, Ragely J. Snarlingtooth in The Epic Tales of Captain Underpants episode "The Angry Abnormal Atrocities of the Astute Animal Aggressors", Atheist Steve in the Devil May Care episode "The Atheist", Manobrain in the Duck Dodgers episode "A Lame Duck Mind", Dale in The Penguins of Madagascar episode "Arch Enemy", Ted in the My Gym Partner's a Monkey episode "Hornbill and Ted's Bogus Journey", Gore-Ax in the Robotomy episode "Mean Green", Mayor Stoughton in the Be Cool, Scooby-Doo! episode "World of Witchcraft").

=== September ===
- September 2: Terry Bradshaw, English actor and Professional Football Quarterback (voiced himself in The Simpsons episode "Treehouse of Horror XVI" and the Scooby-Doo and Guess Who? episode "Falling Star Man!", voice of Preston Rogers in the King of the Hill episode "Peggy Makes the Big Leagues", Broken Arm Robot in Robots).
- September 5: Jeff Olson, American special effects artist (Who Framed Roger Rabbit), (d. 2026).
- September 13: Clyde Kusatsu, American actor and trade union leader (voice of Dr. Zin in The Real Adventures of Jonny Quest, Mr. Wong in Lilo & Stitch: The Series, Grocer in Curious George, Nakasumi in Kim Possible Movie: So the Drama, Mr. Takahashi in Eloise: The Animated Series, Kusunoki Tachi in Heavy Gear: The Animated Series, Domog in The Lion Guard episode "Ghost of the Mountain").
- September 15: Linda Kahn, American television executive (Nickelodeon, Scholastic Entertainment), (d. 2021).
- September 17:
  - John Ritter, American actor (voice of Peter Dickinson in The Flight of Dragons, Inspector Gil in Fish Police, Eugene Grandy in King of the Hill, the title character in Clifford the Big Red Dog and Clifford's Really Big Movie, Great Uncle Stew in Stanley's Dinosaur Round-Up, Dr. David Wheeler in the Batman Beyond episode "The Last Resort"), (d. 2003).
  - James T. Walker, American animator (Warner Bros. Animation, Disney Television Animation, The Smurfs).
- September 19: Jeremy Irons, English actor and activist (voice of Scar in The Lion King and Once Upon a Studio, Bar Rag in The Simpsons episode "Moe Goes from Rags to Riches").
- September 22: Jim Byrnes, American actor and musician (voice of Dr. Light in Mega Man, Merlin in King Arthur and the Knights of Justice, Nick Fury in X-Men: Evolution).
- September 24: Phil Hartman, Canadian-American actor, comedian, screenwriter and graphic designer (voice of Professor Von Joy, Hans-Cuff and Staks in Challenge of the GoBots, Mr. Wilson, Henry Mitchell and Ruff in Dennis the Menace, Air Conditioner and Hanging Lamp in The Brave Little Toaster, Troy McClure and Lionel Hutz in The Simpsons, Psycho Bunny in Eek! The Cat, Calaboose Cal, Hot Dog Vendor and Inspector De Paws in Tom & Jerry Kids, Adolph Hitmaker, Tom Morgan in The Pagemaster, Russian Filmreel Announcer and Midget Clown in The Ren & Stimpy Show, Chauncey in Buster & Chauncey's Silent Night, Game Show Host in the Happily Ever After: Fairy Tales for Every Child episode "The Empress' Nightingale", Vaccu-Spook Auctioneer in The 13 Ghosts of Scooby-Doo episode "Reflections in a Ghoulish Eye", School Patrol Robots and Executive Vice President in The Jetsons episode "Boy George", Captain Frye in the DuckTales episode "Scrooge's Pet", Ace London in the TaleSpin episode "Mach One for the Gipper", Paddywhack in the Darkwing Duck episode "The Haunting of Mr. Banana Brain", Dimitri in the Captain Planet and the Planeteers episode "Mind Pollution", Inspector C. Bass in the Fish Police episode "A Fish Out of Water", Bernie Wasserman and Professor Blowhard in The Critic episode "Eyes on the Prize", Dan Anchorman in the Animaniacs episode "Broadcast Nuisance", Jiji in Kiki's Delivery Service, announcer for Cartoon Network), (d. 1998).

=== October ===
- October 2: Avery Brooks, American actor (voice of Nakkar in the Gargoyles episode "Sentinel", King Maximus in the Happily Ever After: Fairy Tales for Every Child episode "The Golden Goose").
- October 8: Johnny Ramone, American musician and member of the Ramones (voiced himself in The Simpsons episode "Rosebud"), (d. 2004).
- October 11: Judy Kaye, American singer and actress (choir performer in Beauty and the Beast: The Enchanted Christmas, additional voices in The Hunchback of Notre Dame and Courage the Cowardly Dog).
- October 17:
  - Margot Kidder, Canadian-American actress (voice of Solitaire in GoBots: Battle of the Rock Lords, Mistress Helga in Aaahh!!! Real Monsters, continued voice of Gaia in Captain Planet and the Planeteers), (d. 2018).
  - George Wendt, American actor and comedian (voice of Ràoul and Member of the Claws in Garfield on the Town, Ranger #2 in Garfield in the Rough, Johnny Throat and Punchie in The Romance of Betty Boop, Grandpa Frank in Fancy Nancy, Gigi in I Lost My Body, Norm Peterson in The Simpsons episode "Fear of Flying" and the Family Guy episodes "Road to Rupert" and "Three Kings"), (d. 2025).
- October 19:
  - Mimi Gibson, American former actress (voice of Lucky in One Hundred and One Dalmatians).
  - Dave Mallow, American voice actor (voice of Mao Mao, Oculi and Chao in Dragon Ball, Upamon, Angemon and Sepahimon in Digimon Adventure, Otamamon and Tokomon in Digimon Data Squad, Amarao in FLCL, Mr. Barnes and Granpa in Lego Friends), (d. 2025).
- October 20: Sandra Dickinson, American-British actress (voice of Voice Trumpet in the US dub of Teletubbies, Jemima Puddle-Duck in the American dub of The World of Peter Rabbit and Friends, Dixie in Balto, Grandma Tracy in Thunderbirds Are Go, Chico in Counterfeit Cat).
- October 24: Biff Wiff, American actor (voice of Drifter, Keeper and Sgt. Hind in Kiff), (d. 2025).
- October 28: Telma Hopkins, American actress (voice of Maybelle in The Loud House and The Casagrandes, Mrs. Gibson in the Batman Beyond episode "Hooked Up", Rosa Parks in the Histeria! episode "Heroes of Truth and Justice", Mrs. Barnett in the Static Shock episode "The Breed").
- October 29:
  - Kate Jackson, American actress (voice of Bombshell in Batman Beyond and The Zeta Project, Amanda King in the Family Guy episode "Deep Throats", herself in the American Dad! episode "Tears of a Clooney").
  - Bronwen Mantel, Canadian actress (voice of Mrs. McGrady in Arthur, Nurse Lazlo in Mega Babies, Hagalah in Young Robin Hood).

=== November ===
- November 7: Norman Henry Mamey, American composer, conductor, music arranger, musician and orchestrator (The Angry Beavers), (d. 2015).
- November 9: Carlos Loiseau, Argentine comics artist and animator (Ánima Buenos Aires), (d. 2012).
- November 11: Vincent Schiavelli, American actor (voice of Mr. Bailey and Pigeon Man in Hey Arnold!, Zatara in the Batman: The Animated Series episode "Zatanna"), (d. 2005).
- November 18: Dom Irrera, American actor and comedian (voice of Ernie Potts in Hey Arnold!, Duke in Barnyard and Back at the Barnyard, Slippy in Rocko's Modern Life, Spydor in Captain Simian & the Space Monkeys, Achilles in the Hercules episode "Hercules and the Living Legend").
- November 24: John Alvin, American cinematic artist and painter (The Walt Disney Company, Warner Bros. Feature Animation, Don Bluth Entertainment, Amblimation, Fox Animation Studios, The Plague Dogs, The Nutcracker Prince, Tom and Jerry: The Movie, Felidae, Pokémon: The First Movie, Pokémon The Movie 2000, The SpongeBob SquarePants Movie), (d. 2008).
- November 26: Jiří Barta, Czech stop-motion animation director (The Pied Pieper, Toys in the Attic).
- November 28: Dário de Castro, Brazilian actor (dub voice of Martian Manhunter in the DC Animated Universe and The Batman, Rocky in Chicken Run, Agent Six in Generator Rex, Phoebus in The Hunchback of Notre Dame, I.M. Weasel in I Am Weasel, Dr. Cockroach in Monsters vs. Aliens, John Smith in Pocahontas and Pocahontas II: Journey to a New World, Space Ghost in Space Ghost Coast to Coast, Clayton in Tarzan), (d. 2021).
- November 30: Victor Bumbalo, American actor, playwright and television writer (Wow! Wow! Wubbzy!).

=== December ===
- December 3: Ozzy Osbourne, English musician and television personality (voice of King Thrash in Trolls World Tour, Fawn in Gnomeo & Juliet and Sherlock Gnomes, Duke of Drear in The 7D episode "Bummer Vacation", Sid Fishy in the Bubble Guppies episode "Super Guppies!", Earth Troll in the Fish Hooks episode "Legend of the Earth Troll", himself in the South Park episode "Chef Aid"), (d. 2025).
- December 6: JoBeth Williams, American actress (voice of Angel Jones in Fish Police, Jade Kenyon in Jonny's Golden Quest, May and June in the Batman: The Animated Series episode "Sideshow", Queen Ilene in The Legend of Prince Valiant episode "The Secrets of Perilous Garde").
- December 9: Robert Blalack, Panamanian-born American visual effects artist (co-founder of Industrial Light & Magic), (d. 2022).
- December 13: Ted Nugent, American rock musician and activist (voiced himself in The Simpsons episodes "I Don't Wanna Know Why the Caged Bird Sings" and "Politically Inept, with Homer Simpson", and the Aqua Teen Hunger Force episode "Gee Whiz").
- December 15: Melanie Chartoff, American actress (voice of Didi Pickles and Grandma Minka in Rugrats, Aunt Nora in Jumanji, Dr. Sunshine in OK K.O.! Let's Be Heroes).
- December 21:
  - Barry Gordon, American actor (voice of Donatello and Bebop in Teenage Mutant Ninja Turtles, Razor in Swat Kats: The Radical Squadron, Clamhead in Jabberjaw, Inky in Pac-Man, Nesquik Bunny in Nestlé commercials).
  - Samuel L. Jackson, American actor (voice of Frozone in The Incredibles franchise, Gin Rummy in The Boondocks, Mace Windu in Star Wars: The Clone Wars, Nick Fury in What If...? and the Moon Girl and Devil Dinosaur episode "Shoot for the Moon", the title character in Afro Samurai, Whiplash in Turbo, Vic in The Garfield Movie, Joseph in The Proud Family episode "Seven Days of Kwanzaa").
- December 22: Lynne Thigpen, American actress (voice of Luna in Bear in the Big Blue House, Judge in the King of the Hill episode "Hank's Dirty Laundry"), (d. 2003).

=== Specific date unknown ===
- Cary Bates, American comic book and television writer (Gargoyles, RoboCop: Alpha Commando, W.I.T.C.H., Mummies Alive!).
- William Hasley, American screenwriter (The Smurfs, Fat Albert and the Cosby Kids), (d. 2026).
- Joji Hirota, Japanese composer (The Lord of the Rings: The War of the Rohirrim, Animated Tales of the World), (d. 2026).

== Deaths ==
=== June ===
- June 3: Grace Huntington, American animator (Walt Disney Animation Studios), dies at age 35.

=== July ===
- July 9: James Baskett, American actor (voice of the obese crow in Dumbo, portrayed Uncle Remus and voiced Br'er Fox in Song of the South), dies at age 44.
- July 30: Pat Powers, Irish-born American film and animation producer and distributor (served as the first distributor of Walt Disney's film series Mickey Mouse and Silly Symphonies, co-founder (with Ub Iwerks) of the animation studio Iwerks Studio; produced the silent animated film series Fuller Pep, which was similar in premise to Paul Terry's Farmer Al Falfa series; sold to Walt Disney the Powers Cinephone which enabed Disney to produce sound cartoons, such as Mickey Mouse's Steamboat Willie), dies at age 77.

=== September ===
- September 20: Nicolai Shutorev, American singer (singing voice of Giovanni Jones in the Looney Tunes cartoon "Long-Haired Hare"), dies at age 33.

=== October ===
- October 5: Bert Green, British animator and comics artist (International Film Service), dies at age 63.

== See also ==
- List of anime by release date (1946–1959)
