= 1913 in animation =

Events in 1913 in animation.

== Events ==
- November 23: J.R. Bray releases Colonel Heeza Liar in Africa, which is the first Colonel Heeza Liar cartoon and the debut of the first animated series based on a recurring protagonist.

== Films released ==
- Unknown date – The Grasshopper and the Ant (Russia)
- 23 November – Colonel Heeza Liar In Africa (United States)

== Births ==
=== January ===
- January 5: Jack Hannah, American animator, film director, screenwriter and comics artist, comics artist and comics writer (Walt Disney Animation Studios, Walter Lantz), (d. 1994).
- January 17: Claude Coats, American painter and animator (Walt Disney Animation Studios), (d. 1992).
- January 28: Maurice Gosfield, American actor (voice of Benny in Top Cat), (d. 1964).

=== February ===
- February 19: Frank Tashlin, American cartoonist, comics artist, illustrator, screenwriter, film director and animator (Van Beuren Studios, Terrytoons, Warner Bros. Cartoons, Walt Disney Animation Studios, Columbia Pictures, United Artists), (d. 1972).
- February 21: Joe Oriolo, American film director, producer and writer (co-creator of Casper the Friendly Ghost and Felix the Cat, worked for Fleischer Studios and Famous Studios), (d. 1985).
- February 25:
  - Jim Backus, American actor (voice of Mr. Magoo in various media, Thurston Howell III in The New Adventures of Gilligan and Gilligan's Planet, Smokey the Genie in A-Lad-In His Lamp, Milton in Plutopia), (d. 1989).
  - Nicholas Tafuri, American animator (Fleischer Studios, Famous Studios, Ralph Bakshi), (d. 1990).

=== March ===
- March 12: Loulie Jean Norman, American coloratura soprano singer (voice of Penelope Pinfeather in Melody and Toot, Whistle, Plunk and Boom), (d. 2005).
- March 20: Kenny Gardner, American singer and actor (voice of Dick in Mr. Bug Goes to Town), (d. 2002).
- March 23: Grace Huntington, American animator (Walt Disney Animation Studios), (d. 1948).
- March 30: Marc Davis, American animator and character designer (Walt Disney Animation Studios), (d. 2000).

=== April ===
- April 4: Frances Langford, American singer (sang the Once Upon a Wintertime segment in Melody Time), (d. 2005).
- April 9: Roman Davydov, Russian film director (Adventures of Mowgli), (d. 1988).
- April 16: Les Tremayne, English actor (voice of The Ghost of Christmas Present in Mr. Magoo's Christmas Carol, Humbug in The Phantom Tollbooth, Chester C. Cricket and Harry Cat in The Cricket in Timers Square, A Very Merry Cricket, and Yankee Doodle Cricket, Alexander Graham Wolf and Santa Claus in Raggedy Ann and Andy in The Great Santa Claus Caper, the title character in Raggedy Ann and Andy in The Pumpkin Who Couldn't Smile, the Wishing Well in Daffy Duck's Movie: Fantastic Island, Orin in Rainbow Brite and the Star Stealer, Arthur in Starchaser: The Legend of Orin, Gustav in Tis the Season to Be Smurfy), (d. 2003).
- April 22: Rube Grossman, American comics artist and animator (Fleischer Brothers, Felix the Cat), (d. 1964).
- April 28: Joop Geesink, Dutch comics artist and animator (Loeki de Leeuw, Dusty), (d. 1983).

=== May ===
- May 8: Bob Clampett, American animator, director, producer and puppeteer (Warner Bros. Cartoons, creator of Beany and Cecil), (d. 1984).
- May 25:
  - Carl Wessler, American comics artist, animator and writer (Fleischer Studios), (d. 1989).
  - Benjamin Melniker, American film and television producer (Warner Bros. Animation, Where on Earth Is Carmen Sandiego?, Fish Police, Dinosaucers), (d. 2018).
- May 26: Al Hubbard, American animator and comics artist (Walt Disney Animation Studios), (d. 1984).

=== June ===
- June 7: George Tibbles, American composer and screenwriter (co-wrote The Woody Woodpecker Song), (d. 1987).
- June 14: Ed Nofziger, American animator and comics artist (UPA), (d. 2000).
- June 15: Tom Adair, American songwriter, composer, and screenwriter (Walt Disney Animation Studios, Babar), (d. 1988).

=== July ===
- July 2: Les Goldman, American production manager and producer (co-founder of MGM Animation/Visual Arts), (d. 1983).
- July 8: Bill Thompson, American actor (voice of Droopy, Adolf Wolf in Blitz Wolf, White Rabbit and Dodo in Alice in Wonderland, Mr. Smee in Peter Pan, Jock, Bull, Dachsie, Joe the cook and the Irish policeman in Lady and the Tramp, King Hubert in Sleeping Beauty, Ranger J. Audubon Woodlore in Humphrey the Bear cartoons, Professor Owl in Melody and Toot Whistle Plunk and Boom, Uncle Waldo in The Aristocats, George in the Tom & Jerry short Timid Tabby, Touché Turtle in Touché Turtle and Dum Dum), (d. 1971).
- July 18: Marvin Miller, American actor (narrator in Gerald McBoing-Boing and Sleeping Beauty, voice of Mr. Sun in Our Mr. Sun, Hemo in Hemo the Magnificent, Aquaman in The Superman/Aquaman Hour of Adventure, Great Tree Chief and Master Kon in Fantastic Planet, Busby Birdwell in Fantastic Voyage, Super-Skrull in the Fantastic Four episode "Invasion of the Super-Skrull"), (d. 1985).

=== August ===
- August 22: Milton Quon, American animator (Walt Disney Animation Studios), artist and actor, (d. 2019).
- August 25: Walt Kelly, American animator and cartoonist (Walt Disney Animation Studios), (d. 1973).

=== September ===
- September 4: Alex Lovy, American animator, director and comics artist (Van Beuren, Walter Lantz, Columbia Pictures, Hanna-Barbera), (d. 1992).
- September 11:
  - Elmer Wait, American animator (Warner Bros. Cartoons, namesake of Elmer Fudd), (d. 1937).
  - Gil Turner, American animator, comics artist and film producer (Walt Disney Animation Studios, Warner Bros. Cartoons, Metro-Goldwyn-Mayer cartoon studio, Walter Lantz Productions, UPA, Hanna-Barbera, Format Films), (d. 1967).
- September 30: Bill Walsh, American producer, screenwriter and comics writer (Mary Poppins, Bedknobs and Broomsticks), (d. 1975).

=== October ===
- October 17: Ray Bailey, American animator and comics artist (Fleischer Brothers), (d. 1975).
- October 18: Evelyn Venable, American actress (voice of the Blue Fairy in Pinocchio), (d. 1993).
- October 20: Barney Phillips, American actor (voice of the title character in Shazzan!, Porthos in The Three Musketeers, King Neptune in The Popeye Valentine's Day Special - Sweethearts at Sea, Pere David in No Man's Valley), (d. 1982).
- October 25: Don Lusk, American animator and director (Walt Disney Animation Studios, Peanuts specials, Hanna-Barbera), (d. 2018).
- October 28: Douglas Seale, English actor, film producer and director (voice of the Sultan in Aladdin, Krebbs in The Rescuers Down Under), (d. 1999).

=== November ===
- November 7: Cor Icke, Dutch animator (directed Loeki de Leeuw), (d. 1996).
- November 16: Ellen Albertini Dow, American actress and drama coach (voice of See's Candies Box in Eight Crazy Nights, Helen Washburn and Old Woman #2 in American Dad!, Elderly Woman and Aunt Helen in Family Guy, Azma in The Emperor's New School episode "The Bride of Kuzco"), (d. 2015).
- November 17: Volus Jones, American animator (Warner Bros. Cartoons, Walter Lantz, Format Films, Hanna-Barbera, Famous Studios, UPA, Ralph Bakshi), (d. 2004).

=== December ===
- December 25: Candy Candido, American singer, musician and actor (voice of the Native American chief in Peter Pan, Awful Dynn in The Phantom Tollbooth, crocodile captain in Robin Hood, Mafia messenger in Heavy Traffic, Sal in Hey Good Lookin', Fidget in The Great Mouse Detective), (d. 1999).
- December 28: Sam Cobean, American cartoonist (Walt Disney Animation Studios, The Fox and the Crow), (d. 1951).

=== Specific date unknown ===
- Claude Smith, American animator (Walt Disney Animation Studios, MGM), (d. 2003).
