= List of ChalkZone episodes =

List of episodes of the American children's animated television series ChalkZone

ChalkZone is an American animated television series that aired on Nickelodeon. The show premiered on March 22, 2002, and finished airing its fourth and final season on August 23, 2008. Before becoming a full-fledged series, eight segments aired on the network's Oh Yeah! Cartoons program during 1998 and 1999.

== Series overview ==
Season	Episodes		Originally released	
Season	Episodes		First released	Last released
Pilot			December 31, 1999	
1	6		March 22, 2002	April 26, 2002
2	8		May 30, 2003	November 2, 2003
3	16		February 2, 2004	June 6, 2005
4	10	4	June 7, 2005	June 22, 2005
4	10	6	June 11, 2008	August 23, 2008

== Episodes ==
=== Pilot (1999) ===
On December 31, 1999, Nickelodeon aired a pilot episode consisting of two new ChalkZone segments created for the series ("Future Zone" and "Pie Day") and one ChalkZone segment reused from Oh Yeah! Cartoons ("Secret Passages") as a promotional preview for the series. When the series made its official premiere in 2002, "Future Zone" was repackaged as the third segment of the second episode of Season 1, while "Pie Day" and "Secret Passages" were repackaged as the second and third segments (respectively) of the season's sixth episode.

Title	Directed by	Written by	Storyboarded by	Original release date	Prod. code
"Future Zone Pie Day Secret Passages"	George Chialtas Jaime Diaz Larry Leichliter	Steve Marmel; Story by : Steve Marmel, Bill Burnett, Jenny Nissenson, and Larry Huber Larry Huber Bill Burnett and Larry Huber	Alex Kirwan and Rose Rosely John Ahern Sean Bishop	December 31, 1999	999
Craniac 3, a robot obsessed with futuristic inventions, kidnaps Rudy in hopes of getting the magic chalk. / Snap tries to get "Pie Day" back into operation. / Rudy and Penny travel through ChalkZone in order to get to the school at night, however the plan goes haywire and ChalkZone is almost discovered by their teacher, Mr. Wilter, before he becomes crazy with the police when he tries to explain that Rudy was coming out of the chalkboard with Rudy and Penny learning that they are going to have a substitute teacher for a while.

=== Season 1 (2002) ===
Note: This season was originally produced from 1999 to 2000 but wasn't aired by Nickelodeon until 2002. The second season had already been completed by the time the series premiered.

No. overall	No. in season	Title	Directed by	Written by	Storyboarded by	Original release date	Prod. code
1a	1a	"Rudy's First Adventure"	George Chialtas and Jaime Diaz	Larry Huber and Bill Burnett	Barry Bunce and Carlos Ramos	March 22, 2002	101a
While in detention for taking the blame for Reggie Bullnerd, Rudy discovers a new place called ChalkZone and meets Snap.
1b	1b	"Rudy's Story"	Larry Leichliter	Jenny Nissenson	Barry Bunce	March 22, 2002	101b
Rudy must rescue Snap from a bubble gum spider while he tells his story to the new girl, Penny Sanchez.
1c	1c	"Bushel Full of Yum"	Younghee Higa	Story by : Jenny Nissenson	John Fountain	March 22, 2002	101c
Song #1
2a	2a	"Snapmobile"	George Chialtas	Steve Marmel	Paul McEvoy	April 12, 2002	102a
Snap gets a car that takes all of his commands (and figures of speech) literally.
2b	2b	"Rudy's Date"	Larry Leichliter	Larry Huber and Bill Burnett	Carlos Ramos	April 12, 2002	102b
Rudy brings his friend Penny to ChalkZone to help her find a formula, but Snap sees Penny as Rudy's girlfriend.
2c	2c	"Future Zone"	George Chialtas	Steve Marmel; Story by : Steve Marmel, Bill Burnett, Jenny Nissenson, and Larry Huber	Alex Kirwan and Rose Rosely	April 12, 2002	102c
Craniac 3, a robot obsessed with futuristic inventions, kidnaps Rudy in hopes of getting the magic chalk.
2d	2d	"Mumbo Jumbo Jump"	Younghee Higa	Unknown	John Fountain	April 12, 2002	102d
Song #2
3a	3a	"The Wiggies"	George Chialtas	Bill Burnett	John Fountain	April 26, 2002	103a
Rudy accidentally lets hair-eating creatures called Wiggies into the real world.
3b	3b	"Rapunzel"	Larry Leichliter	Bill Burnett and Larry Huber	John Fountain	April 26, 2002	103b
A ChalkZone play gets destroyed by a thunderstorm.
3c	3c	"Hair to Stay"	George Chialtas	Jenny Nissenson	Paul McEvoy	April 26, 2002	103c
Snap gets a mustache that won't leave him alone.
3d	3d	"Coming to Life"	Larry Leichliter	Unknown	John Fountain	April 26, 2002	103d
Song #3
4a	4a	"French Fry Falls"	George Chialtas and Monte Young	Bill Burnett and Larry Huber	Paul McEvoy and Bob Boyle	March 29, 2002	104a
While going down the Amazin' River, Rudy, Penny and Snap encounter Biclops, the Chalk Mine guard whom Rudy previously met.
4b	4b	"Gift Adrift"	Jaime Diaz	Bill Burnett and Steve Marmel	Barry Bunce	March 29, 2002	104b
Rudy needs to find a hiding place for a vacuum cleaner for his dad's birthday and puts it in ChalkZone. However, it starts sucking up all the chalkdust and Rudy and Penny reverse it before it's too late.
4c	4c	"Escucha Mi Corazon"	Jaime Diaz	Story by : Bill Burnett and Jenny Nissenson	Don Morgan	March 29, 2002	104c
Song #4
5a	5a	"Snap Out of Water"	Larry Leichliter	Bill Burnett and Larry Huber	Alex Kirwan	April 26, 2002	105a
During recess, Rudy gets stuck in ChalkZone and Snap is stuck in the real world. He acts as Rudy's substitute and gets into a fight with Reggie Bullnerd.
5b	5b	"Two Left Feet"	Jaime Diaz	Jenny Nissenson	David Smith	April 26, 2002	105b
A square dance goes crazy.
5c	5c	"Rudus Tabootus"	Russ Mooney	Bill Burnett	Paul McEvoy and Barry Bunce	April 26, 2002	105c
While visiting a colosseum tour with his parents, Rudy enters a chariot race with a cheating opponent.
5d	5d	"All Day Jam"	Larry Leichliter	Unknown	John Fountain	April 26, 2002	105d
Song #5
6a	6a	"The Skrawl"	Larry Leichliter	Larry Huber and Bill Burnett	Alex Kirwan	April 5, 2002	106a
Rudy encounters Skrawl, a drawing of Rudy's that had been tampered with and gets blamed for his ugliness.
6b	6b	"Pie Day"	Jaime Diaz	Larry Huber	John Ahern	April 5, 2002	106b
Snap tries to get "Pie Day" back into operation.
6c	6c	"Secret Passages"	Larry Leichliter	Bill Burnett and Larry Huber	Sean Bishop	April 5, 2002	106c
Rudy and Penny travel through ChalkZone in order to get to the school at night, however the plan goes haywire and ChalkZone is almost discovered by their teacher, Mr. Wilter, before he becomes crazy with the police when he tries to explain that Rudy was coming out of the chalkboard with Rudy and Penny learning that they are going to have a substitute teacher for a while.
6d	6d	"In the Zone"	Larry Leichliter	Unknown	Barry Bunce	April 5, 2002	106d
Song #6

=== Season 2 (2003) ===
No. overall	No. in season	Title	Directed by	Written by	Storyboard by	Original release date	Prod. code
7	1	"Hole In The Wall The Terrible Two-and-a-halfs Super Hero Snap I'm Back & Bluer Than Ever (Song #7)"	Jaime Diaz Mike Svayko and Russ Mooney Pat Ventura and Russ Mooney John Kimball	Bill Burnett Jenny Nissenson Larry Huber TBA	Barry Bunce Louis Scarborough Pat Ventura Louis Scarborough	May 30, 2003	201
A moneymaker gets into ChalkZone and decides to make "The Greatest Theme Park in the Universe". / Rudy's 2-year-old cousin gets lost in ChalkZone with the Magic Chalk. / Snap questions his lack of superpowers because of his costume.
8	2	"Disappearing Act Portable Portal Snap on Tour Making Faces (Song #8)"	Larry Leichliter and Bob Nesler Monte Young Mike Svayko John Kimball	Jenny Nissenson Bill Burnett and Jenny Nissenson Bill Burnett TBA	Enrique Braxton May Ron Brewer Garrett Ho Ric Heitzman	June 6, 2003	202
Rudy volunteers for Reggie's Disappearing Act (a cabinet with a trapdoor) and escapes through the back into ChalkZone. Reggie, seeing an eraser where Rudy was, supposes he turned him into an eraser. / Rudy uses a portable chalkboard to talk to Snap while being chased by a strict art teacher named Miss. Tweezer. / Snap gives a tour of ChalkZone.
9	3	"Waste Mountain Madcap Snap What's My Line? Putting on the Dog (Song #9)"	Jaime Diaz John Kimball Jaime Diaz John Kimball	Jenny Nissenson Bill Burnett and Jenny Nissenson Larry Huber TBA	Barry Bunce Jim Schumann Ron Brewer Barry Bunce	June 20, 2003	203
While working with his dad at the meat shop, Rudy is forced to take out the trash by using ChalkZone for storage, he dumps a bag of "Cheeseburger Smoothies" on top of the Magic Chalk Mine and he must race to retrieve it before it destroys the mine. / Rudy realizes that his fans are drawing Snaps with chalk, resulting in several Snap clones. / Blocky questions the simplicity of his design.
10	4	"Pop Goes The Balloon Snap Builds His Dream House Fireplug Ballet There You Are (Song #10)"	Bob Nesler Bob Shellhorn John Kimball Bob Nesler	Pop Goes The Balloon; Peggy Sarlin Snap Builds His Dream House and Fireplug Ballet; Bill Burnett There You Are; TBA	Pop Goes The Balloon; Garrett Ho Snap Builds His Dream House; Louis Scarborough Fireplug Ballet and There You Are; Pat Ventura	June 27, 2003	204
After Rudy discovered that he can't go to Hawaii with his parents because of their wedding anniversary, Rudy goes to ChalkZone and has his chalk teenage versions of his parents break up, and he must get them back together or his parents will start an argument for a long time. / Snap asks Rudy to make a dreamhouse with the magic chalk, but asks for too much, driving Rudy crazy. / Snap and Queen Rapsheeba attend a ballet. Note: This episode has never aired on Nicktoons (After 2005).
11	5	"The Heist Battle of the Hands Chocolate Brunch Oh My My (Song #11)"	The Heist and Battle of the Hands; Monte Young Chocolate Brunch; Russ Mooney Oh My My; John Kimball	Bill Burnett Peggy Sarlin Jenny Nissenson TBA	Louis Scarborough Ron Brewer Pat Ventura Barry Bunce	July 11, 2003	205
When Plainsville is voting to change the name of the town, Thor Throat (a famous wrestler) pays a surprise visit to host the event. While everyone is distracted by the event, Thor attempts to rob the town bank but eventually failed. / Rudy takes a magical piece of red chalk from a locked room in the Magic Chalk Mine, and the red chalk turns to be an evil magic. / Blocky and Snap find a couple of eggs out in the open.
12	6	"The Smooch Power Play All The Way To The Top (Song #12)"	John Kimball and Bob Nesler Russ Mooney Bob Nesler	Bill Burnett Jenny Nissenson TBA	Barry Bunce Garrett Ho Louis Scarborough	August 1, 2003	206
Rudy and the gang go to the Hahama's to see a special bird named The Smooch. / Rudy forgets to do a science project for the science fair and by using ChalkZone to create something, but he almost reveals ChalkZone to the outside world. Note: The episode "The Smooch" was not included in ChalkZone: The Complete Series on DVD due to music licensing issues.
13	7	"Pumpkin Love Snap's Nightmare (Chip Of Fools) Irresistible Please Let Me In (Song #13)"	Pumpkin Love; Jaime Diaz Chip Of Fools; Richard Bowman Irresistible and Please Let Me In; John Kimball	Larry Huber Bill Burnett and Jenny Nissenson Jenny Nissenson TBA	Pumpkin Love and Chip Of Fools; Enrique Braxton May Irresistible and Please Let Me In; Pat Ventura	October 30, 2003	207
It's Halloween and Rudy made a Jill-o-lantern for the school Jack-o-lantern contest. In order to get past Reggie, Rudy goes through ChalkZone but before he can sneak into the contest; Snap takes Rudy to a concert where he loses his Jill-o-lantern. / When researching ChalkZone, Rudy and Penny take samples of a chocolate chip cookie tree to examine, but Snap "eats" them before they can and has a bad nightmare about it. / Snap gets a new cologne and becomes "Irresistible". Note: This episode has never aired on Nicktoons (After 2007) or Nick on CBS.
14	8	"Chalk Queen Cleo's Secret Snap's Wishy Washout Chunky (Song #14)"	Rick Bowman and John Kimball Monte Young Jaime Diaz John Kimball	Larry Huber Jenny Nissenson Aydrea Walden TBA	Barry Bunce Enrique Braxton May Pat Ventura Jeff Stewart	November 2, 2003	208
Penny is working on her Biology report and asks Rudy to do some illustrations for her. When he fails to do them for her and leaves to save ChalkZone, Skrawl returns to ChalkZone to give her a chance for revenge. / While on a school field trip to the art museum, Rudy and Penny take a trip to ChalkZone to uncover the secrets of Cleopatra and win the Archaeology Gee-Wiz Award. / Snap catches a shooting star and gets 3 wishes.

=== Season 3 (2004–05) ===
No. overall	No. in season	Title	Directed by	Written by	Storyboard by	Original release date	Prod. code
15	1	"Draw and Let Draw The Towering Wilter Snapsheebah Flashlight (Song #15)"	Draw and Let Draw; Monte Young The Towering Wilter; Jaime Diaz Snapsheebah and Flashlight; John Kimball	Jenny Nissenson Ford Riley Bill Burnett and Jenny Nissenson TBA	Louis Scarborough and Joe Daniello Jeff Stewart Barry Bunce Pat Ventura	February 2, 2004	301
Rudy decides to fix other kids' drawings to prevent them causing trouble when they're erased into ChalkZone, but it backfires as the drawings are not what Rudy assumed them to be. / After getting an F on a test, Rudy goes into ChalkZone to find a piece of writing that shows their teacher, Mr. Wilter, told his class to study the wrong chapter. / Snap sneaks into Rapsheeba's sold-out show by dressing up as one of her dancers.
16	2	"Taffy Follow the Bouncing Bag Nighty Note Dream a Lotta Dreams (Song #16)"	Taffy; Monte Young Follow the Bouncing Bag; Jaime Diaz Nighty Note and Dream a Lotta Dreams; John Kimball	Peggy Sarlin Bill Burnett and Jenny Nissenson Jenny Nissenson TBA	Enrique Braxton May Garrett Ho Pat Ventura Barry Bunce	February 3, 2004	302
A big taffy glacier is heading towards ChalkZone city and Rudy must stop it. Unfortunately, the glacier is not normal taffy. / Vinny is back and is trying to get into ChalkZone once again. / Snap can't sleep due to the racket caused by his upstairs neighbors.
17	3	"Lost In Chalk Asleep at the Chalk If You Can't Beat 'Em, Eat 'Em Scat (Song #17)"	Lost In Chalk and Asleep at the Chalk; Richard Bowman If You Can't Beat 'Em, Eat 'Em and Scat; John Kimball	Lost In Chalk; Jenny Nissenson Asleep at the Chalk and If You Can't Beat 'Em, Eat 'Em; Aydrea Walden Scat; TBA	Lost In Chalk; Louis Scarborough Asleep at the Chalk; Barry Bunce If You Can't Beat 'Em, Eat 'Em and Scat; Joe Daniello	February 4, 2004	303
Rudy and Penny get lost in ChalkZone, and they must find a way to get back to the real-world before Rudy and his dad participate in the competition. / Rudy doesn't want to sleep, so he explores the nightlife in ChalkZone, unfortunately his sleepiness causes a catastrophe. / Snap has an issue when his food starts talking.
18	4	"Water Water Everywhere RV Having Fun Yet? The Doofi Lollypoppian Rhapsody (Song #18)"	Bob Nesler and Monte Young Monte Young Rick Leon John Kimball	Bill Burnett Aydrea Walden Allen Glazier TBA	Bob Nesler Byron Vaughns Louis Scarborough Pat Ventura	February 5, 2004	304
Rudy tries to enter ChalkZone but accidentally opens a portal under the Wait 'N Sea causing chalk water to gush out into the real world. Worse still, the water seems to have a fountain of youth effect on adults. / Snap encounters an RV that constantly annoys him with his singing. / Bullnerd draws goofy versions of Rudy and Penny. When they get erased into ChalkZone, they cause problems for its citizens.
19	5	"That Thing You Drew That Sinking Feeling Insect Aside"	John Kimball Jaime Diaz John Kimball	Jenny Nissenson Ford Riley Bill Burnett	Barry Bunce Enrique Braxton May Pat Ventura	February 6, 2004	305
Rudy tries to invite a cartoonist to his school for a presentation. / When Bullnerd steals Rudy's magic chalk, he accidentally gets his foot stuck inside a portal to ChalkZone. / Snap and Rapsheeba get small - thanks to a spell cast by Stinky Witch.
20	6	"Let's Twister Again Legend of the Golden Worms Beanie Boys to Men Good To Go (Song #19)"	Jaime Diaz, John Kimball, Bob Nesler, and Monte Young Jaime Diaz Monte Young John Kimball	Let's Twister Again and Legend of the Golden Worms; Peggy Sarlin Beanie Boys to Men; Aydrea Walden Good To Go; TBA	John Fountain Ron Brewer Pat Ventura Garrett Ho	March 12, 2004	306
ChalkZone has weather problems when a kid keeps drawing twisters and erasing them. / On an exploration to ChalkZone, Rudy and Snap encounter a tyrant king who demands Rudy tell him an interesting story, or he'll feed Snap to a hungry spine-eating dog. / Snap and SpyFly get a peek into what Skrawl is up to on Snap's TV show.
21	7	"Mother Tongue Going Eyeballistic The Ballad of Toe Fu Golden Thumb (Song #20)"	John Kimball Bob Nesler Dave Brain and Monte Young John Kimball	Ford Riley Peggy Sarlin Bill Burnett TBA	Barry Bunce and Garrett Ho Barry Bunce Joe Daniello Pat Ventura	June 3, 2004	307
Rudy and the gang encounter Mother Tongue, who causes you to speak gibberish after she licks you. Unfortunately, this happens just as Penny has an important speech. / Snap and Rudy stumble into an eyeball bush during germination season, and the eyeballs won't let them go until they bring the seeds to a new location so the plant can reproduce. / Around the campfire Snap sings of legendary pacifist character Toe Fu.
22	8	"Indecent Exposure My Big Fat Chalk Wedding Rap-A-Present Greetings From Greenland (Song #21)"	Bob Nesler Jaime Diaz and John Kimball Rick Bowman John Kimball	Larry Huber Dan Serafin Ford Riley TBA	Bob Nesler Barry Bunce Jeff Stewart Barry Bunce	October 13, 2014 (The Complete Series DVD) November 10, 2020 (CBS All Aceess/Paramount Plus)	308
Local reporter Terry Bouffant has figured out the existence of ChalkZone and is planning to reveal it to the world. / Rudy has an issue with a chalk character who wants to marry him. / Snap tries to find a present to give to Queen Rapsheeba, but it's not easy when the flowers, chocolates and cards in ChalkZone are alive and have quirks of their own. Note: This episode was originally scheduled to air on Nickelodeon on June 4, 2004, but for some reason it never did. Also this episode has never aired on Nicktoons or Nick on CBS.
23	9	"Skrawl's Brain The Big Loo Duck Snap Duck The Happiest Song in the World (Song #22)"	Jaime Diaz Richard Bowman Bob Nesler John Kimball	Jenny Nissenson Bill Burnett and Jenny Nissenson Jenny Nissenson TBA	Louis Scarborough Enrique Braxton May Ron Brewer Pat Ventura	June 9, 2004	309
Skrawl builds a giant brain shaped robot to take over ChalkZone, but when it goes AWOL, Skrawl must team up with Rudy to defeat it. / Snap is abducted by a giant toilet in the sewers who wants Snap to sing for him. / Snap tries to help a one-legged duck win a race.
24	10	"Double Trouble Midnight Train (Song #23)"	Jaime Diaz and Monte Young John Kimball	Bill Burnett and Ford Riley; Story by : Aydrea Walden	Garrett Ho and Enrique Braxton May Barry Bunce	April 23, 2004	310
Skrawl has teamed up with Craniac 4 to try and destroy Rudy and the Magic Chalk Mine once and for all.
25 26	11 12	"The Big Blow Up"	Richard Bowman, George Chialtas, Jaime Diaz, John Kimball, and Monte Young	Bill Burnett and Ford Riley	Barry Bunce, Garrett Ho, Enrique Braxton May, and Bob Nesler	August 6, 2004	311 312
Rudy releases an ancient ChalkZone disease that makes anyone made out of chalk blow up within hour's infection. Note: This special has never aired on Nicktoons (after 2005) or Nick on CBS.
27	13	"The Smudges Tiny Pirate Problem Curse of the Werefrog Magic Carpet Ride (Song #24)"	Monte Young John Kimball Monte Young John Kimball	Jenny Nissenson Peggy Sarlin Jenny Nissenson TBA	Jeff Stewart Louis Scarborough Pat Ventura Joe Daniello	October 8, 2004	313
Queen Rapsheeba's new house is haunted by smudges, beings that are formed when characters are only partially erased on blackboards. / Rudy, Snap, and Penny must help a cruise ship captain with a "tiny pirate problem". Turns out the captain means it literally and the pirates are tiny sized, but still dangerous. / Snap is cursed into a werefrog, and he'll change form every time there's a full moon.
28	14	"Howdy Rudy Attack of the Rudosaurus The Really Big Talent Search Livin' It Up (Song #25)"	Bob Nesler Jaime Diaz Richard Bowman John Kimball	Bill Burnett and Larry Huber Jenny Nissenson Ford Riley TBA	John Fountain Louis Scarborough Pat Ventura Barry Bunce	October 22, 2004	314
Rudy draws a chalk puppet after Reggie's dog destroys his old one and against his judgement decides to make it alive. / Rudy sneaks into Dinomite Park by drawing a giant dinosaur in ChalkZone and bringing it into the real world. / Snap tries to find someone to play the role of the giant for his superhero movie.
29	15	"When Santas Collide"	John Kimball and Monte Young	Bill Burnett	Barry Bunce, Garrett Ho, and Bob Nesler	December 9, 2004	315
After Rudy thinks he isn't getting what he wanted for Christmas during an argument with his parents, he storms off to his room and goes into ChalkZone and watches how the Zoners celebrate the winter holiday, learning the spirit of the season in the process, until he accidentally endangers Christmas/Hanukkah/Ramadan/Deepavali/Kwanzaa there. Will he save the holidays before it's too late?
30	16	"Purple Haze No Place Like Home Disaster Park I Need a Song (Song #26)"	Jaime Diaz and John Kimball Rick Leon and Bob Nesler Richard Bowman and Monte Young Monte Young	Purple Haze; Bill Burnett No Place Like Home and Disaster Park; Ford Riley I Need a Song; TBA	Enrique Braxton May John Conning and John Fountain Byron Vaughns John Fountain	June 6, 2005	316
Comic Book Artist creates a Haze that will destroy anything that gets erased into ChalkZone. / All of ChalkZone is abducted by aliens and Rudy & Penny must save them. / Blocky and Snap's pet moustache get trapped in a dangerous theme park.

=== Season 4 (2005–08) ===
Nickelodeon began airing Season 4 in June 2005 before abruptly halting the broadcast of new episodes for 3 years until June 2008 when the remaining 6 episodes began airing, with the final episode airing in August.

No. overall	No. in season	Title	Directed by	Written by	Storyboard by	Original release date	Prod. code
31	1	"Do the Twitch Day of the Living Mall Bulky Blocky Piece O' Cake (Song #27)"	Bob Nesler Monte Young George Chialtas John Kimball	Peggy Sarlin Aydrea Walden Peggy Sarlin TBA	Do the Twitch; Enrique Braxton May Day of the Living Mall and Bulky Blocky; Garrett Ho Piece O' Cake; Bob Nesler	June 7, 2005	401
Rudy uses a machine called the Twitch'o'Matic to make him the ultimate dancer. / Penny demands an explanation from Rudy on why he stopped the Super Mega Mall Project. / Snap gets Blocky into shape to teach a bully a lesson.
32	2	"School of Destruction Family Von Snap Knight Plight Earthmover (Song #28)"	John Kimball Monte Young Jaime Diaz John Kimball	Ford Riley Ford Riley and Bill Burnett Jenny Nissenson TBA	School of Destruction; Bob Nesler and Garrett Ho Family Von Snap and Knight Plight; Barry Bunce Earthmover; Joe Daniello	June 8, 2005	402
Rudy gets grounded for bad grades because of spending too much time with his chalk drawing...on the day of his favorite glam metal band's concert and Rudy realizes that he is going to miss the concert, so he decides to sneak out by traveling through ChalkZone in order to get to the concert on time so he can meet up with Penny. / Snap learns about his family background. / Three knights require Snap's help to retrieve their Holy Grail.
33	3	"Disarmed Rudy Poison Pen Letter The Label Police Too Much to Do (Song #29)"	Jaime Diaz Richard Bowman and John Kimball Monte Young John Kimball	Ford Riley Bill Burnett and Ford Riley Ford Riley TBA	Lenord Robinson Enrique Braxton May Andy Schuhler Jeff Stewart	June 9, 2005	403
Rudy breaks his arm and on that same day Jacko wants him to draw a bride. / Rudy writes a Poison Pen Letter to a girl from school when she doesn't invite him to her party. / Snap goes to jail for tearing off a pillow tag, so he, along with a lot of other imprisoned zoners, manage to escape.
34	4	"The Crush Gift of Good Intentions Snapshots 2: Wild ChalkZone! Go Pop (Song #30)"	John Kimball Jaime Diaz George Chialtas and John Kimball Monte Young	The Crush and Gift of Good Intentions; Jenny Nissenson Snapshots 2: Wild ChalkZone! Bill Burnett, Jenny Nissenson, and Ford Riley Go Pop; TBA	Dusty Wakefield and Scott Wood Garrett Ho Steven Muller Joe Daniello	June 22, 2005	404
Rudy gets his first crush on Rapsheeba's Creator, an African-American teenage girl named Trina. / Rudy draws a box that will give anyone the perfect gift. / Snap's TV Show looks into the Flora & Fauna of ChalkZone.
35	5	"The Quicksand Man Vampire Cannibals of New York Killer Breath Time to Go Home (Song #31)"	The Quicksand Man; George Chialtas Vampire Cannibals of New York, Killer Breath, and Time To Go Home; Monte Young	The Quicksand Man; Ford Riley Vampire Cannibals of New York and Killer Breath; Jenny Nissenson Time To Go Home; TBA	Lane Lueras Garrett Ho Steven Muller Joe Daniello	June 11, 2008 (USA) April 23, 2006 (Japan)	405
Rudy, Penny, and Snap must stop a new nightmare chalkmonster before everyone lives out their own worst nightmare. / Rudy's comic book characters gets out of control in Chalk New York. / Snap must detain the Doofi's latest mess-up.
36	6	"Reggie the Red Vincent Van NoGo The Further Adventures of Super Hero Snap It Is to Laugh (Song #32)"	J. K. Kim and John Kimball Monte Young Jaime Diaz John Kimball	Ford Riley Bill Burnett Larry Huber TBA	Jeff Stewart Louis Scarborough Steven Muller Bob Nesler	June 13, 2008	406
Reggie discovers ChalkZone .... and the Red Chalk! / Rudy, Penny, and Snap meet a Vincent Van Gogh Chalk Masterpiece in need of an attitude adjustment. / Snap returns to a life of a superhero with Blocky as his sidekick.
37	7	"Mellow Drama Falls Journey to the Center of the Yeti The White Board Doofus Penny"	John Kimball and Steve Socki Rob Hughes Monte Young Richard Bowman	Aydrea Walden Jenny Nissenson Bernie Petterson Aydrea Walden	Mellow Drama Falls; Pat Ventura Journey to the Center of the Yeti; Louis Scarborough The White Board and Doofus Penny; Bernie Petterson	June 28, 2008 (USA) May 7, 2006 (Japan)	407
The ChalkZone gang enter the silent movie era of ChalkZone. / Snapshots takes a closer look at the Yada Yada Yeti. / Rudy discovers White Board Zone. / Doofus Penny takes Snap on a tour through her new Exhibition.
38	8	"Brainy Bitsy Teacher's Lounge 2:40 Mosquito (Song #33)"	Jaime Diaz John Kimball and Larry Leichliter Monte Young John Kimball	Brainy Bitsy and Teacher's Lounge; Jenny Nissenson 2:40; Ford Riley Mosquito; TBA	Enrique Braxton May Barry Bunce Pat Ventura Bob Nesler	August 2, 2008 (USA) May 14, 2006 (Japan)	408
An ChalkChimp gets to full of herself when she interferes with Penny's Mum Experiment. / Rudy must prove his innocence for a crime he did not commit. / Snap and Rapsheeba go on a Top Secret Mission.
39	9	"Snap vs. BooRat Calling Dr. Memory Snapsody in Blue Let's Go Wandering (Song #34)"	J. K. Kim George Chialtas Larry Leichliter John Kimball	Bill Burnett Jenny Nissenson Bill Burnett TBA	Snap vs. BooRat; Bob Nesler Calling Dr. Memory; Louis Scarborough Snapsody in Blue and Let's Go Wandering; Dave Rodriguez	August 16, 2008	409
Snap must save Rudy and Penny from a creature who is determined to expose ChalkZone to the real world. / Snap takes a trip down Memory Lane .... Literally! / Planet Snap plunges into a deep blue by the cause of a new BLUE sun.
40	10	"The Day ChalkZone Stood Still BullSnap Mine Alone Let It Blow My Way (Song #35)"	John Kimball Monte Young Jaime Diaz and John Kimball John Kimball	Bill Burnett and Ford Riley Jenny Nissenson Larry Huber TBA	The Day ChalkZone Stood Still; Enrique Braxton May BullSnap; Garrett Ho Mine Alone and Let it Blow My Way; Barry Bunce	August 23, 2008	410
ChalkZone time stops and Rudy, Penny, and Snap must solve the mystery before it's too late. / Snap swaps Mind with a bull and Rudy and Penny must switch him back. / Snap creates a new security system for the Magic Chalk Mine.
