= ChalkZone =

American animated television series

- Genre: Comedy; Fantasy; Adventure; Musical
- Created by: Bill Burnett; Larry Huber
- Voices of: E. G. Daily; Candi Milo; Hynden Walch; Robert Cait; Jess Harnell; Miriam Flynn; Rodger Bumpass; Jim Cummings; Rosslynn Taylor; Rob Paulsen
- Theme music composer: Bill Burnett
- Opening theme: "Rudy's Got the Chalk"
- Ending theme: "Rudy's Got the Chalk"
- Composers: Guy Moon (seasons 1–3); Thomas Chase (season 1); Steve Rucker (season 1); Geoff Levin (seasons 3–4)
- Country of origin: United States
- Original language: English
- No. of seasons: 4
- No. of episodes: 40 (144 segments) (list of episodes)

Production
- Executive producers: Bill Burnett; Larry Huber; Fred Seibert (seasons 2–4)
- Running time: 23 minutes (3–11 minutes per segment)
- Production companies: Frederator Incorporated; Nickelodeon Animation Studios

Original release
- Network: Nickelodeon
- Release: March 22, 2002 – June 22, 2005
- Release: June 11 – August 23, 2008

Related
- Oh Yeah! Cartoons

ChalkZone is an American animated television series created by Bill Burnett and Larry Huber for Nickelodeon. The series follows Rudy Tabootie, an elementary school student who discovers a box of magic chalk that allows him to draw portals into the ChalkZone, an alternate dimension where everything ever drawn with chalk and later erased comes to life. Rudy is joined in his adventures by Snap, a wisecracking superhero Rudy once drew with chalk, and Penny Sanchez, Rudy's academically intellectual classmate and personal friend.

ChalkZone originally premiered as a pilot short on Fred Seibert's Oh Yeah! Cartoons animated shorts showcase in 1998. The series ran on Nickelodeon from March 22, 2002, to August 23, 2008, with 40 episodes in total. It was produced by Nickelodeon Animation Studios in association with Frederator Incorporated.

== Premise ==
The series follows Rudy Tabootie (voiced by E. G. Daily), a 10-year-old, fifth-grade boy who loves to draw. Reggie Bullnerd (Candi Milo), the school bully, constantly teases him or gets him into trouble with Mr. Wilter (Robert Cait), Rudy's grumpy school teacher who strongly dislikes cartoons, especially Rudy's passion for art. One day while in detention, Rudy discovers a piece of "White Lightnin'" chalk, which allows access to the ChalkZone, a place where everything and everyone that has ever been drawn in chalk and erased exists as living/touchable entities. He soon makes friends with Snap (Candi Milo), a short, blue, humanoid drawing made by Rudy when he was eight years old. Snap wears a superhero outfit and is very adventurous and funny. Rudy only lets one other person know about ChalkZone, his best friend Penny Sanchez (speaking voice, Hynden Walch; singing voice, Robbyn Kirmssè), who acts as the genius of the group.

While in ChalkZone, the three are introduced to Cyclops (Rodger Bumpass), the kilt-wearing guardian of the magic chalk mines where Rudy obtains his magic chalk (Rudy later draws a second eye for him and renames him "Biclops"); Queen Rapsheeba (Rosslynn Taylor), ChalkZone's musical artist whom Snap has a crush on; and Blocky (Candi Milo; Robert Cait), a light green block friend of Snap's and Rudy's first-ever drawing. They also face villains such as Skrawl (Jim Cummings), a drawing who blames Rudy for being ugly and wants to destroy him, and the Craniacs (Rob Paulsen), a gang of robot drawings obsessed with collecting futuristic devices.

== Episodes ==
Season	Episodes		Originally released	
Season	Episodes		First released	Last released
Pilot			December 31, 1999	
1	6		March 22, 2002	April 26, 2002
2	8		May 30, 2003	November 2, 2003
3	16		February 2, 2004	June 6, 2005
4	10	4	June 7, 2005	June 22, 2005
4	10	6	June 11, 2008	August 23, 2008

== Characters ==
=== Main ===
- Rudolph Bartholomew "Rudy" Tabootie (voiced by E.G. Daily): The show's protagonist. He is in fifth grade. He travels to ChalkZone with his best friends Penny and Snap. He uses magic chalk that he can use to draw portals into ChalkZone and draw things out of thin air. Rudy is ten years old, and eight years old in Oh Yeah! Cartoons.
- Snap (voiced by Candi Milo): A short, blue, humanoid superhero drawing made by Rudy, and his best friend. Created by Rudy when he was 8 years old, Snap speaks with a New York accent, and is adventurous and mischievous.
- Penelope Victoria "Penny" Sanchez (voiced by Hynden Walch): Rudy's Latina friend, a genius who helps him. She is the only other human besides Rudy who knows about ChalkZone. She and Rudy are implied to have romantic interests on each other, as hinted by Snap and other characters.

=== Supporting ===
- Reginald "Reggie" Bullnerd (voiced by Candi Milo): A troublesome school bully and Rudy's rival. His full name is revealed to be "Reginald Brunicky Tracey Aloysius Socrates Yauney Sunshine Bullnerd", discovered by Rudy in the episode "Teachers' Lounge". He is known to have his own records for the trouble he caused at school.
- Joseph Walter "Joe" Tabootie (voiced by Jess Harnell): Rudy's father, who runs a meat shop.
- Mildred Trish "Millie" Tabootie (voiced by Miriam Flynn): Rudy's mother, who often calls Rudy in an operaesque voice.
- Horace T. Wilter (voiced by Robert Cait): Rudy's cartoon-hating school teacher, despite that he once enjoyed cartoons when he was younger. Wilter is also annoyed by Rudy's love of art, telling him that it will get him nowhere in life, despite Rudy proving him wrong. He comes close to learning about ChalkZone in the episode "Secret Passages."
- Veronica Sanchez (voiced by Nika Futterman): Penny's mother, who is a doctor and scientist.
- Tilly McNally (voiced by Grey DeLisle): Rudy's aunt and Millie's sister.
- Sophie McNally (voiced by Grey DeLisle): Rudy's two-year old cousin, Joe and Millie's niece and Tilly's only daughter.
- Biclops (voiced by Rodger Bumpass): The slight Scottish-accented guardian of the Magic Chalk Mines. He was originally named "Cyclops" until Rudy gave him a second eye. He wears a Scottish attire, including a kilt around his legs. His two eyes are drawn on top of each other. He is also like an uncle/older brother figure to Rudy.
- Queen Rapsheeba (voiced by Rosslynn Taylor): ChalkZone's prominent musical artist and Snap's love interest, but drawn by Trina.
- Blocky (voiced by Robert Cait and Candi Milo in his earlier appearances): Snap's friend. He is a light green cube block and is claimed to be Rudy's first-ever drawing.
- Skrawl (voiced by Jim Cummings): Rudy's archenemy in ChalkZone. He is a drawing that was messed up by a bunch of kids at a birthday party Rudy had gone to. Skrawl blames Rudy for being ugly and wants to destroy him.
- Granny in the Bathtub (voiced by Miriam Flynn): A drawing that Rudy made, intended for humor.
- Chalk Dad (voiced by Jess Harnell): A drawing Rudy made, who resembles and sounds similar to his father.
- The Craniacs (voiced by Rob Paulsen): A series of robot drawings obsessed with collecting futuristic devices. The current version is Craniac 4, drawn by Rudy to get rid of Craniac 3. The Craniacs are based on Brainiac from the Superman comics.
- Bruno Bullnerd (voiced by Jeff Bennett): Reggie's father who works as a sanitation engineer.
- Vinnie Raton (voiced by Rob Paulsen): A greedy greaser who first appears in "Hole In the Wall" where he destroys Joe and Millie's old school they attended when they were Rudy and Penny's age. He later finds out about the truth of ChalkZone.
- Terry Bouffant (voiced by Grey DeLisle): The cynical news reporter for Plainville, but named after a poofy, wavy style. In the episode "Indecent Exposure" she finally discovers the truth about ChalkZone.

== Production ==
ChalkZone was the creation of Bill Burnett and Larry Huber, with Huber's idea of a boy with magic chalk and Burnett's idea of a world behind the chalkboard. The concept's origin dated back during the production of Hanna-Barbera's What a Cartoon! where Seibert originally wanted Huber to develop a cartoon for the showcase and assigned him with Burnett, who was writing for Cow and Chicken at the time, to develop a pilot for a potential series. Development fell through at the last minute from the result of Hanna Barbera Cartoons being absorbed into Warner Bros. Animation. The concept came back when Seibert developed Frederator Studios and was pitched as a short on Nickelodeon's Oh Yeah! Cartoons before getting the greenlight in 1998. In 1999, ChalkZone became the first spin-off of Oh Yeah! Cartoons to enter production and be greenlit. Despite this, ChalkZone did not air until 2002; executive decisions shortened the initial 13 episodes to six, all of which were completed by 2000. The show's air date was up for debate until Nickelodeon's lack of new programming and the United States' critical situation at the time led to the decision to air the series in 2002. Frederator Studios announced in 2005 that the series had been cancelled at 40 episodes.

The show is remembered for featuring one-minute music videos sung by Rudy and his friends (credited as "Rudy & The Chalkzone Band") at the end of each episode. Several songs Bill Burnett composed before ChalkZone's production, i.e. "Insect Aside" and "Dream Alotta Dreams", were implanted into the series. A well-liked rumor about the show is that it was based on UK preschool program Simon in the Land of Chalk Drawings (which Nickelodeon aired in the early 1980s as part of Pinwheel). Bill Burnett denied this in a 2013 interview, claiming that he was not aware of the series' existence until after ChalkZone entered production, although Burnett did mention that Harold and the Purple Crayon was an influence on Larry's idea for the "boy with magic chalk" concept. A one-hour special, "The Big Blow Up", premiered on August 6, 2004. The final season featured new character designs with a slimmer line quality and a zooming chalk transition as new art staff and overseas studios were used for the remainder of the series.

The show had four different variations of the theme song released to the public, one from the 2001 Nickelodeon album, "The Newest Nicktoons", which used a synthesizer instead of a guitar and had an earlier version of Penny's voice which was a demo Bill Burnett created in order for the song to get the green-light, an earlier version of the final version from the album "ChalkZone: In the Zone", where the guitar was used and Penny's earlier voice was still used, and the final version which was shown on regular episodes. Another variation was shown in the 1999 pilot, which not only featured a slightly different opening sequence and logo from the final series but also features a preparatory track mix of the final version and the second demo albeit with some modified vocals, also with Penny's final voice used. Bill Burnett's original idea for the concepts' score was something in akin to simplistic children's toy instrument melodies to fit the show's children's "chalk-drawing" theme, but the Nickelodeon crew suggested a more techno rock-based score to give the show a huge contrast from the premise. Steve Rucker was brought into the music composition team and some of his compositions were later re-written upon request by Burnett and Moon to fit the series better, much to his dismay.

== Broadcast ==
The pilot for the series first aired on December 31, 1999 on Nickelodeon, as part of that night's Nickellennium 2000 block. The series would not be seen again on the network until it made its official premiere on March 22, 2002. The 2002 premiere became the highest-rated premiere in Nickelodeon's history up to that point.

The show aired in reruns on "Nick on CBS" for more than a year from February 1, 2003, to September 11, 2004 in the United States. In Canada, the series airs on YTV in 2003 to 2007. In June 2005, following the announcement that the series had been cancelled, the fourth season of the series premiered. Of the season's 11 episodes, only five would be aired that year before Nickelodeon abruptly halted the broadcast of new episodes. The remaining six episodes would not air until three years later in June and August 2008.

Since the series' cancellation, reruns aired on Nicktoons until October 30, 2016. ChalkZone reruns aired on NickSplat (then known as "The Splat") for two nights only on November 12 and 13, 2016, as part of a block that ran every weekend from August until December commemorating the 25th anniversary of the Nicktoons franchise. NickSplat –including ChalkZone– was a subscription channel based on VRV from 2018 to 2020.

The complete series is available on Paramount+.

== Home media ==
During the show's original run, there were no DVD releases specifically for ChalkZone. The episode "Future Zone" was released on the Nickstravaganza! VHS. Three episodes ("Gift Adrift", "French Fry Falls", and "Eschucha Mi Corazon") were released for the Nickstravaganza! 2 DVD (only "French Fry Falls" was included on the VHS). The Christmas-themed episode, "When Santas Collide", was featured on the 2006 DVD Nick Picks Holiday. A Complete Series DVD set was released through Amazon.com's CreateSpace manufacture-on-demand program on October 13, 2014. A soundtrack album In the Zone was released. The entire series is available on Prime Video, the PlayStation Store, and Paramount+.

Region 1
Title	Format	Season(s)	Episode count	Release date	Episodes
Nickstravaganza!	VHS	1	1	March 4, 2003	"Future Zone"
Nickstravaganza! 2	Both DVD and VHS	1	1 (VHS); 3 (DVD)	September 2, 2003	"French Fry Falls" (VHS) "French Fry Falls" / "Gift Adrift" / "Escucha Mi Corazon" (DVD)
Nick Picks Holiday	DVD	3	1	September 26, 2006	"When Santas Collide"
The Complete Series	DVD (CreateSpace release)	1–4	40	October 13, 2014 (Amazon exclusive)	All episodes Excluded: "The Smooch" (due to music licensing issues with the three-piece Caribbean band)

== Reception ==
=== Critical ===
Joly Herman of Common Sense Media rated the series 3 out of 5 stars, saying, "What makes this show interesting is that it acknowledges that worlds of imagination are available to all of us. But while it's true that we love to get lost in a story, for a young child, getting as lost in a world as Rudy does can be scary." Lana Berkowitz from The Houston Chronicle wrote, "There are flashes of fun in [ChalkZone], the action moves along, and there's no violence. But cartoon connoisseurs, particularly those who stay tuned after loony SpongeBob SquarePants at 7 p.m., probably will need something more intriguing to keep their attention." Berkowitz further added, "After a clever setup, Chalkzone settles into a predictable zone with stories that could easily be erased from memory." Allison Fass of The New York Times praised the imagination and creativity in the series, but she opined that series creator Bill Burnett's message, "We have to take responsibility for what we create", may be "a little mature" for children.

=== Awards and nominations ===
Year	Award	Category	Nominee	Result
2002	BMI Film & TV Awards	BMI Cable Award	Guy Moon	Won
2004	31st Annie Awards	Outstanding Achievement in an Animated Television Production Produced for Children	ChalkZone	Nominated
2004	31st Annie Awards	Outstanding Storyboarding in an Animated Television Production	"Pumpkin Love"	Nominated
