= Jeff Olson (visual effects artist) =

American visual effects artist (1948–2026)

- Born: September 5, 1948
- Died: June 21, 2026 (aged 77)
- Education: University of California, Berkeley
- Occupation: Visual effects artist

Jeff Olson (September 5, 1948 – June 21, 2026) was an American visual effects artist. He was best known for his visual effects work in the films Star Trek, Who Framed Roger Rabbit, Die Hard 2, Star Trek: First Contact, Ghostbusters II, Star Wars: Episode I – The Phantom Menace, Back to the Future Part III and Rush Hour 3.

Olson died on June 21, 2026, at the age of 77.
