= Jackie Berger =

Belgian actress (1948–2025)

- Berger in 2022
- Born: 22 August 1948; Ixelles, Belgium
- Died: 15 October 2025 (aged 77); Montpellier, France
- Occupation: Actress

Jackie Berger (22 August 1948 – 15 October 2025) was a Belgian actress.

== Biography ==
Berger was primarily a dubbing actress, notably serving as the French voice of Danny Torrance in The Shining and of Rocky Balboa Jr. in Rocky III.

Berger died in Montpellier on 15 October 2025, at the age of 77.
