= Danny Bravo =

American actor (1948–2025)

- Born: Daniel Zaldivar; January 29, 1948; Los Angeles, California, U.S.
- Died: October 30, 2025 (aged 77)
- Occupation: Actor
- Years active: 1959–1969

Daniel Zaldivar (January 29, 1948 – October 30, 2025), better known as Danny Bravo, was an American actor, best known as the voice of Hadji in the television series Jonny Quest.

== Early life ==
Daniel Zaldivar was born in Los Angeles, California on January 29, 1948. His surname Zaldivar is of Basque origin.

== Career ==
After a handful of minor film appearances, he played the title role of an Indian boy training a race horse, to win money to build a shrine for his village, in the 1960 film For the Love of Mike (credited as "Danny Zaidivar"). The same year he had a minor role in the classic Western film The Magnificent Seven. In 1962 he played the title character "Ramon", a Latino boy featured prominently in an episode of 87th Precinct. He provided the voice of the character Hadji, the Calcutta-raised foster brother of the title character in the well-remembered animated television series Jonny Quest (1964–1965). He continued acting and doing voice work for a few years after its cancellation.

== Death ==
Bravo died on October 30, 2025, at the age of 77.

== Filmography ==
=== Film ===
| Year | Title | Role | Notes |
|---|---|---|---|
| 1959 | Holiday for Lovers | Young Boy | Uncredited |
| 1960 | For the Love of Mike | Michael Littlebear | Credited as Danny Zaldivar |
| 1960 | The Magnificent Seven | Boy with O'Reilly | |
| 1966 | For Pete's Sake! | | |

=== Television ===
| Year | Title | Role | Notes |
|---|---|---|---|
| 1959 | General Electric Theater | Chico | Episode: "Beyond the Mountains"; credited as Danny Zaidivar |
| 1960–1961 | One Step Beyond | Jorge / Juanito | 2 episodes; credited as Danny Zaldivar |
| 1961 | Adventures in Paradise | Pea | Episode: "The Fires of Kanua" |
| 1962 | 87th Precinct | Ramon Morales | Episode: "Ramon" |
| 1962 | The Lloyd Bridges Show | Tasso | Episode: "Wheresoever I Enter..." |
| 1963 | Wagon Train | Felipe Perez | Episode: "The Adam MacKenzie Story" |
| 1963 | The Richard Boone Show | | Episode: "Captain Al Sanchez" |
| 1963 | The Travels of Jaimie McPheeters | Kiwa | Episode: "The Day of the Pawnees: Part 1" |
| 1964 | Kraft Suspense Theatre | Juan | Episode: "A Truce to Terror" |
| 1964–1965 | Jonny Quest | Hadji (voice) | 25 episodes |
| 1966–1967 | Run for Your Life | Lorenzo Romero / Paco | 2 episodes |
| 1968 | Off to See the Wizard | Kim | 2 episodes |
| 1969 | The New Adventures of Huckleberry Finn | Prince / Chaboonu (voice) | 2 episodes; uncredited, final role |
