= Larry Huber =

American television producer, writer, and animator

- Born: Lawrence Huber; Minnesota, U.S.
- Education: Chouinard Art Institute (B.F.A.)
- Occupations: Television producer; writer; animator
- Years active: 1969–present
- Television: ChalkZone

Lawrence "Larry" Huber is an American television producer, writer, and animator who is known for his long history as a producer at Hanna-Barbera, Ruby-Spears, and Nickelodeon. Huber began his animation career in 1969 while working on Hanna-Barbera's The Perils of Penelope Pitstop. He went on to work for Ruby-Spears for 15 years. Returning to Hanna-Barbera in 1990, Huber worked on 2 Stupid Dogs and Fish Police. He was hired by Buzz Potamkin to supervise production on Cartoon Network's World Premiere Toons in 1995.

Huber left Hanna-Barbera in 1996 following the company's merger with Turner Broadcasting. Along with Bill Burnett, Huber co-created and executive produced an Oh Yeah! Cartoons pilot on Nickelodeon, which would later air as ChalkZone as a full series. Huber continued his role in animation on Random! Cartoons and Adventure Time, created by Pendleton Ward originally for Nickelodeon and later greenlit by Cartoon Network, which premiered in 2010.

Animotion Works, a company founded by Huber, was launched in 2004 in Burbank, California. The company has produced the Danger Rangers series for PBS.

== Career ==
Huber began working in animation in 1969 as an assistant to Hanna-Barbera on The Perils of Penelope Pitstop. He later left Hanna-Barbera to work for Ruby-Spears, a job he held for 15 years.

Huber returned to Hanna-Barbera in 1990 to work on 2 Stupid Dogs and the short-lived series Fish Police. He was soon hired by producer Buzz Potamkin to supervise production on Fred Seibert's then-upcoming World Premiere Toons shorts program (later named What a Cartoon!) on Cartoon Network. The series consisted of 48 animated shorts and spawned new creator-driven original programming for the network, including Dexter's Laboratory (the show paid homage to Huber, naming the titular character's school as Huber Elementary), Cow and Chicken, Johnny Bravo, I Am Weasel, The Powerpuff Girls, and Courage the Cowardly Dog.

After Turner Broadcasting merged with Time Warner in October 1996, Huber left Hanna-Barbera once again to become an executive producer on Seibert's other animated shorts showcase, Oh Yeah! Cartoons, on Nickelodeon. Huber's ChalkZone short from Oh Yeah! Cartoons, which he co-created with Bill Burnett, was picked up by Nickelodeon for a full series. It premiered on March 22, 2002, with the highest ratings for a new show premiere in the network's history at the time. He continued to work with big idea cartoon incubators, consulting on Seibert's Random! Cartoons, which spawned Eric Robles' Fanboy & Chum Chum (in which he also directed the voice actors), Adventure Time by Pendleton Ward and Ward's Bravest Warriors. He continued to be involved with Bravest Warriors as a consultant to show runner Breehn Burns and as an animation director.

In 2004 Huber launched his own production company called Animotion Works, located in Burbank, California. The company has since produced the educational children's television series Danger Rangers for PBS, which ran from September 3, 2005, to December 26, 2006.

== Personal life ==
Huber has a Bachelor of Fine Arts degree in Cinemagraphics from the Chouinard Art Institute (now the California Institute of the Arts), which he obtained from 1964 to 1968.

== Filmography ==
Year	Work	Credit	Notes
1983	The Puppy's Further Adventures	Associate producer	TV movie
1983	Beauty and the Beast	Associate producer	TV movie
1983	Saturday Supercade	Associate producer	TV series
1983	Rubik, the Amazing Cube	Associate producer	TV series
1984	I Love the Chipmunks Valentine Special	Associate producer	TV movie
1984	ABC Weekend Special	Associate producer	TV series
1984	Dragon's Lair	Associate producer	TV series
1984	Turbo Teen	Associate producer	TV series
1984	Cabbage Patch Kids: First Christmas	Producer	TV movie
1984	Robo Force: The Revenge of Nazgar	Associate producer	TV movie
1984	Rose Petal Place	Associate producer	TV short
1985	A Chipmunk Reunion	Associate producer	TV movie
1985	Rose Petal Place: Real Friends	Associate producer	TV movie
1983-1985	Mister T	Associate producer	TV series
1985	It's Punky Brewster	Producer	TV series
1986	Lazer Tag Academy	Supervising producer	TV series
1986	The Centurions	Producer	TV series
1986	Chuck Norris: Karate Kommandos	Producer	TV series
1983–1985; 1987	Alvin and the Chipmunks	Associate producer; supervising producer	TV series
1987	A Mouse, a Mystery and Me	Animation producer	TV movie
1988	Superman	Producer	TV series
1988	Police Academy: The Series	Producer	TV series
1990	Grim Prairie Tales	Executive producer	Film
1989–1990	Dink, the Little Dinosaur	Producer	TV series
1990	Piggsburg Pigs!	Producer	TV series
1992	Fish Police	Producer	TV series
1993-1995	2 Stupid Dogs	Producer	TV series
1993	A Flintstone Family Christmas	Producer	TV movie
1993–94	Droopy, Master Detective	Producer	TV series
1995	Dexter's Laboratory	Executive producer	Short film
1995	Short Orders	Supervising producer	TV movie
1995	Short Pfuse	Supervising producer	TV movie
1995–97	What a Cartoon!	Executive producer	TV series
1995–99	Cow and Chicken	Executive producer	TV series
1996–97	The Real Adventures of Jonny Quest	Executive producer	TV series
1996–2003	Dexter's Laboratory	Executive producer	TV series
1997	Johnny Bravo	Executive producer	TV series
1997–99	I Am Weasel	Executive producer	TV series
1998–2000	Oh Yeah! Cartoons	Executive producer	TV series
2002–08	ChalkZone	Executive producer	TV series
2005–06	Danger Rangers	Executive producer	TV series
2007–09	Random! Cartoons	Executive producer	TV series
2010	Pom Pom and Friends: The Big Mystery	Voice producer: English voice	Short
2010–11	Cloud Bread	Creative producer	TV series
2011–12	Pom Pom and Friends	Advising producer	TV series

== Accolades ==
Year	Award	Category	Work	Shared with	Result
1994	Primetime Emmy Awards	Outstanding Animated Program (for Programming One Hour or Less)	A Flintstone Family Christmas	Joseph Barbera, William Hanna, Sean Roche, David Ehrman, Ray Patterson and Chris Cuddington	Nominated
1995	Primetime Emmy Awards	Outstanding Animated Program (for Programming One Hour or Less)	Dexter's Laboratory	Buzz Potamkin and Genndy Tartakovsky (for "Changes")	Nominated
1996	Primetime Emmy Awards	Outstanding Animated Program (for Programming One Hour or Less)	Dexter's Laboratory	Genndy Tartakovsky, Craig McCracken, and Paul Rudish (for "The Big Sister")	Nominated
1996	Primetime Emmy Awards	Outstanding Animated Program (for Programming One Hour or Less)	Cow and Chicken	Buzz Potamkin, David Feiss, Pilar Menendez, and Sam Kieth (for "No Smoking")	Nominated
1997	Primetime Emmy Awards	Outstanding Animated Program (for Programming One Hour or Less)	Dexter's Laboratory	Sherry Gunther, Craig McCracken, Genndy Tartakovsky, and Jason Butler Rote (for "Star Spangled Sidekicks", "T.V. Superpals", and "Game Over")	Nominated
2006	CINE Competition	CINE Golden Eagle	Danger Rangers	Mike D. Moore, Howard G. Kazanjian, and Ilie Agopian (for "The Great Race")	Won
