= Jonny Quest (TV series) =

American animated television series

- Title card
- Also known as: The Adventures of Jonny Quest
- Genre: Adventure; Action; Spy-fi; Science fiction
- Created by: Doug Wildey
- Written by: William D. Hamilton; Walter Black; Charles Hoffman; Joanna Lee; Alan Dinehart; Herbert Finn; Doug Wildey; William Hanna; Joseph Barbera
- Directed by: William Hanna; Joseph Barbera
- Voices of: Tim Matheson; Danny Bravo; Mike Road; John Stephenson; Don Messick; Vic Perrin; Henry Corden
- Theme music composer: Hoyt Curtin
- Composers: Hoyt Curtin; Ted Nichols
- Country of origin: United States
- No. of episodes: 26

Production
- Producers: William Hanna; Joseph Barbera
- Running time: 25 minutes
- Production company: Hanna-Barbera Productions

Original release
- Network: ABC
- Release: September 18, 1964 – March 11, 1965

Jonny Quest, also known as The Adventures of Jonny Quest, is an American animated science fiction adventure television series about a boy who accompanies his scientist father on extraordinary adventures. It was produced by Hanna-Barbera Productions for Screen Gems, and was created and designed by the comic book artist Doug Wildey.

The show was inspired by radio serials and comics in the action-adventure genre, and featured more realistic art, human characters, and stories than Hanna-Barbera's previous cartoon programs. It was the first of several Hanna-Barbera action-based adventure shows—which would later include Space Ghost, The Herculoids, and Birdman and the Galaxy Trio—and ran on ABC in prime time on early Friday nights for one season from 1964 to 1965.

After 20 years of reruns, during which time the series appeared on all three major U.S. television networks of the time, new episodes were produced for syndication in 1986 as part of The Funtastic World of Hanna-Barbera's second season. Two telefilms, a comic book series, and a second revival series, The Real Adventures of Jonny Quest, were produced in the 1990s. Characters from the series also appear throughout The Venture Bros., which was developed as a parody of it.

== Development ==
Comic book artist Doug Wildey, after having worked on Cambria Productions' 1962 animated television series Space Angel, found work at the Hanna-Barbera studio, which asked him to design a series starring the radio drama adventure character Jack Armstrong, the All-American Boy.

Wildey wrote and drew a presentation, using magazines like Popular Science, Popular Mechanics, and Science Digest "to project what would be happening 10 years hence", and devising or updating such devices as a "snowskimmer" and hydrofoils. When Hanna-Barbera could not or would not obtain the rights to Jack Armstrong, the studio had Wildey rework the concept. Wildey said he "went home and wrote Jonny Quest that night—which was not that tough." For inspiration, he drew on Jackie Cooper and Frankie Darro movies, Milton Caniff's comic strip Terry and the Pirates, and, at the behest of Hanna-Barbera, the James Bond movie Dr. No. As Wildey described in 1986, producer Joe Barbera had seen that first film about the English superspy "and wanted to get in stuff like '007' numbers. Which we included, by the way, in the first [episode of] Jonny Quest. It was called 'Jonny Quest File 037' or something. We dropped that later; it didn't work. But that was his father's code name as he worked for the government as a scientist and that kind of thing." Wildey stated that Hanna-Barbera refused to give him a "created by" credit, and that he and the studio "finally arrived on 'based on an idea created by', and that was my credit."

Jonny Quest debuted on ABC at 7:30 p.m. EDT on Friday, September 18, 1964. As comics historian Daniel Herman wrote,

Wildey's designs on Jonny Quest gave a cartoon a distinctive look, with its heavy blacks [i.e. shading and shadow] and its Caniff-inspired characters. ... The show was an action/adventure story involving the feature's namesake, an 11-year-old boy. The cast of characters included Jonny's kid sidekick, named Hadji, Jonny's globetrotting scientist dad ... and the group's handsome bodyguard, secret agent Race Bannon, who looks as if he stepped out of the pages of [Caniff's comic strip] Steve Canyon. ... The look of Jonny Quest was unlike any other cartoon television show of the time, with its colorful backgrounds, and its focus on the characters with their jet packs, hydrofoils, and lasers. Wildey would work on other animation projects, but it was with his work on Jonny Quest that he reached his widest audience, bringing a comic book sense of design and style to television cartoons.

Wildey did not design the more cartoonishly drawn pet bulldog, Bandit, which was designed by animator Richard Bickenbach.

Although they do not appear in any episode, scenes from the Jack Armstrong test film were incorporated into the Jonny Quest closing credits. They feature Jack Armstrong and Billy Fairfield escaping from African warriors by hovercraft. The test sequence and several drawings and storyboards by Wildey were used to sell the series to ABC and sponsors.

The show's working titles were The Saga of Chip Baloo, which Wildey said "wasn't really serious, but that was it for the beginning", and Quest File 037. The name Quest was selected from a phone book, for its adventurous implications.

== Characters ==
The Quest team. Front row (left to right): Dr. Benton Quest and "Race" Bannon. Back row: Jonny Quest, Hadji, and Bandit

The five main characters of the show are:

- Jonathan "Jonny" Quest (voiced by Tim Matheson) is a Tom Swift-like 11-year-old American boy who lost his mother at an early age. Although unenthusiastic in his schooling, he is intelligent, brave, adventurous, and generally athletic. Additionally, he is proficient in judo, scuba diving, and handling firearms. He is responsible, honest, and treats adults with respect.
- Dr. Benton C. Quest (voiced by John Stephenson for five episodes, Don Messick for the remainder of the series ) is Jonny's father and a scientific genius who works for the U.S. Government. He is considered "one of the three top scientists in the world", with interests and technical know-how spanning many fields. In the first episode, one of the government agents mentions that Jonny lost his mother, but it is not stated when or how she died. The fact a special agent was assigned to protect Jonny implies she may have been killed by foreign agents. As a result, he has raised Jonny and Hadji as a single father, and is willing to take decisive action when necessary for survival or defense. As the two agents in the first episode fly to Palm Key to meet with Dr. Quest, one explains to the other that "if Jonny fell into the hands of enemy agents, Dr. Quest's value to science would be seriously impaired." Therefore, it is important that Jonny be protected.
- Roger T. "Race" Bannon (voiced by Mike Road) is a special agent from Intelligence One assigned to safeguard Jonny "24 hours a day and 7 days a week as tutor, companion and all-around watchdog". Race was born in Wilmette, Illinois, to John and Sarah Bannon. He is an expert in judo, having a third-degree black belt and the ability to defeat notorious experts in various sporting techniques, including sumo wrestlers. He is also a pilot. His design was modeled after actor Jeff Chandler. His name is a combination of Race Dunhill and Stretch Bannon from an earlier comic strip. The surname Bannon is Irish, derived from 'O'Banain', and means "white".
- Hadji Singh (voiced by Danny Bravo) is a streetwise 11-year-old Kolkata orphan who becomes the adopted son of Dr. Benton Quest, as well as Jonny's best friend and adoptive brother. He is rarely depicted without his bejeweled turban and Jodhpuri. He is the seventh son of a seventh son and seems to possess mystical powers, including snake-charming, levitation and hypnotism. He is proficient in judo, as well, which he learned from an American Marine. The Quest family meets Hadji while Dr. Quest is lecturing at Calcutta University; he subsequently joins the Quest team after saving Dr. Quest's life. Although more cautious than Jonny, he is often talked into going on adventures.
- Bandit is Jonny's pet dog, named because he is white with black markings, including markings resembling a black domino mask around his eyes. Bandit is unique among his fellow Hanna-Barbera dogs, such as Scooby-Doo, Huckleberry Hound, and Hong Kong Phooey, in that he is a regular non-anthropomorphic dog. However, he is seemingly capable of understanding human speech. Don Messick provided Bandit's vocal effects, which were combined with an archived clip of a dog barking. Creator Doug Wildey wanted to have a monkey as Jonny's pet, but he was overruled by Hanna-Barbera. Wildey has said Bandit was intended to be a bulldog, though his appearance is closer to a Boston Terrier.

The Quest family has a home compound in the Florida Keys located on the island of Palm Key, but their adventures take them around the world as they travel the globe studying scientific mysteries, which generally end up being the work of various adversaries. These adversaries range from espionage robots and electric monsters to Egyptian mummies and prehistoric pterosaurs.

Although most antagonists appeared in only one episode, there are recurring antagonists such as Dr. Zin, an Asian criminal mastermind. Dr. Zin and other characters were voiced by Vic Perrin.

Race's mysterious old flame Jade (voiced by Cathy Lewis) appears in two episodes, as do the characters of Corbin, an Intelligence One agent, and the Professor, a scientist colleague of Dr. Quest's.

Hadji's friend Pasha Peddler appears in the episode "Calcutta Adventure" and is instrumental in arranging Hadji's adoption by the Quest family. Pasha appears to make a living by buying and selling anything he can profit from, and he aids the Quests in their adventure. Although Pasha is presented as and claims to be a native of India, he speaks in jazz-tinged colloquial English. Notably, his skin tone resembles the Quests and not other Asian characters in the show. Although it is never stated outright, it is implied that Pasha is the U.S. Marine who originally taught Hadji to speak English and raised him, which is supported by the fact that Pasha is a skilled helicopter pilot.

== Broadcast history ==
Jonny Quest aired from September 18, 1964, to March 11, 1965, in prime time on the ABC network and was an almost instant success both critically and ratings-wise. However, it was canceled after one season due to its high production costs. According to Iwao Takamoto who worked on the series, William Hanna was willing to do more of the series and presented estimates for a second season to ABC who ultimately declined to order any further episodes as the cost to keep the series at the same level of quality as its previous season made the network reluctant to commit.

Jonny Quest also aired on CBS Saturday mornings from 1967 to 1970 before switching back to ABC where it aired as part of their Saturday morning block from 1970 to 1972. NBC acquired broadcasting rights to Jonny Quest in 1979 and aired the series as part of their 1979–80 Saturday morning television schedule.

Like the original Star Trek television series, the series was profitable in syndication, but this was not as well known when the show was canceled in 1965. Along with another Hanna-Barbera series, The Jetsons, Jonny Quest is one of the few television series to have aired on each of the Big Three television networks in the United States.

Beginning in 2024 reruns aired on MeTV Toons.

== Episodes ==
No.	Title	Written by	Original release date
1	"The Mystery of the Lizard Men"	Joseph Barbera, William Hanna, Douglas Wildey, and Alex Lovy	September 18, 1964
While investigating the disappearance of multiple ships in the Sargasso Sea, Dr. Quest discovers a secret laser base (operated by a foreign provocateur and protected by lizard-suited scuba divers) hidden aboard an 18th-century shipwreck. Note: Hadji does not appear in this episode.
2	"Arctic Splashdown"	Walter Black	September 25, 1964
A foreign submarine crew races Dr. Quest and his recovery team (aboard an American icebreaker) to a downed experimental missile in the Arctic ice cap. Note: This episode marks the first appearance of Hadji.
3	"The Curse of Anubis"	Walter Black	October 2, 1964
A former archaeologist friend-turned Arab nationalist revolutionary named Ahmed Kareem, who is being stalked by a vengeful mummy, attempts to frame Dr. Quest and Race for the theft of a priceless Egyptian statue. Note: This is the only episode where Vic Perrin voices somebody other than Dr. Zin (Dr. Ahmed Kareem in this case).
4	"Pursuit of the Po-Ho"	William D. Hamilton	October 9, 1964
While going to the aid of a captive fellow scientist in the Amazon jungle, Dr. Quest is abducted (for ritual sacrifice) by a tribe of hostile native warriors.
5	"Riddle of the Gold"	Herbert Finn and Alan Dinehart	October 16, 1964
While investigating a bar of fake gold from a supposedly exhausted Indian mine, Dr. Quest discovers an alchemist counterfeit ring (conceived by his nemesis Dr. Zin and operated from the palace of an impostor Maharaja) that could damage the global financial market. Note: First appearance of Dr. Zin and the first episode where Don Messick voices Dr. Quest.
6	"Treasure of the Temple"	Walter Black	October 23, 1964
While on an archaeological expedition to an ancient Mayan city in the Yucatán jungle, Dr. Quest is threatened by a greedy, ruthless British treasure hunter named Perkins and his native confederates searching for riches in the same ruins.
7	"Calcutta Adventure"	Joanna Lee	October 30, 1964
While investigating a mysterious ailment in India, Dr. Quest discovers an underground nerve-gas factory (operated by a criminal mastermind and protected by hazmat-suited guards) hidden high within a remote mountain range. There is also a flashback recounting the adoption of Hadji.
8	"The Robot Spy"	William D. Hamilton	November 6, 1964
Dr. Zin sends a large, black, cyclopean, four-legged spider-like robot (by a flying saucer-like craft) to a U.S. government research facility in the American Southwest to steal the secrets of a para-power ray gun on which Dr. Quest is working.
9	"Double Danger"	Joanna Lee	November 13, 1964
An impostor disguised as Race is infiltrated into Dr. Quest's expedition to gather a rare pharmaceutical plant by Dr. Zin (who covets the plant's potential mind-control properties) in the jungles of Thailand. Note: The first appearance of Jade and the final time John Stephenson voices Dr. Quest.
10	"Shadow of the Condor"	Charles Hoffman	November 20, 1964
After an emergency landing in the Andes Mountains, Race is challenged to an aerial dogfight by Baron Heinrich von Frohleich, an old German fighter ace of World War I fame. (Frohleich possesses a collection of vintage aircraft at his Bavarian-style castle in South America.) The Baron's machine guns, however, are loaded — Race's are not. Note: This is the only episode where Race refers to Dr. Quest by his first name of Benton.
11	"Skull and Double Crossbones"	Walter Black	November 27, 1964
In the Caribbean Sea, a new cook aboard the Quest research vessel, betrays his employer to a gang of Mexican pirates that are seeking a sunken treasure chest that are discovered by Jonny.
12	"The Dreadful Doll"	William D. Hamilton	December 4, 1964
While researching marine biology in the Caribbean, Dr. Quest encounters a phony witch doctor who is protecting a secret submarine base (under construction by a criminal contractor) with his supposed voodoo powers.
13	"A Small Matter of Pygmies"	William D. Hamilton	December 11, 1964
When the members of his team descend in a plane crash over uncharted jungle territory, Dr. Quest must rescue them (with the help of local authorities) from a tribe of hostile Pygmy warriors.
14	"Dragons of Ashida"	Walter Black	December 18, 1964
On a visit to Japan, Dr. Quest finds that an old biologist friend (having gone insane) is breeding over-sized carnivorous lizards for the purpose of hunting human prey.
15	"Turu the Terrible"	William D. Hamilton	December 25, 1964
While searching for a rare strategic mineral in the Amazon jungle, Dr. Quest and Race discover a prehistoric Pteranodon, trained by a wheelchair-using slave driver to capture and guard native workers needed for his mining operation.
16	"The Fraudulent Volcano"	William D. Hamilton	December 31, 1964
While investigating unusual tremors on a tropical island in the South Pacific, Dr. Quest and Race uncover a secret ray gun base operated by Dr. Zin and protected by hovercraft-mounted guards hidden deep within a local volcano.
17	"Werewolf of the Timberland"	William D. Hamilton	January 7, 1965
While hunting for samples of petrified wood in the Canadian Rockies, Dr. Quest is threatened by a gang of lumberjacks (one of whom disguises himself as a werewolf) intent on protecting their gold-smuggling operation.
18	"Pirates from Below"	Walter Black	January 14, 1965
The Quest home compound in Florida is attacked by foreign submarine-borne agents, intent on hijacking a new prober submarine that Dr. Quest is developing for the United States Navy.
19	"Attack of the Tree People"	Walter Black	January 21, 1965
Jonny and Hadji are marooned by shipwreck on an island off the coast of the African continent where they are adopted by a tribe of friendly brown gorilla-like apes. They protect Jonny and Hadji from the Australian poachers Silky and Chopper intent on kidnapping them for ransom. When the poachers managed to abduct Dr. Quest and Race, Jonny and Hadji must persuade the apes to help rescue them and defeat the poachers.
20	"The Invisible Monster"	William D. Hamilton	January 28, 1965
Dr. Quest responds to the distress signal from a fellow scientist, who has accidentally unleashed an (invisible) energy monster on a South Pacific island. Note: This episode is generally remembered as the most frightening one in the series.
21	"The Devil's Tower"	William D. Hamilton	February 4, 1965
While doing atmospheric research in the African savanna, Dr. Quest uncovers an inaccessibly high plateau populated by prehistoric cavemen who have been trained as slave laborers for diamond mining by Klaus Heinrich von Dueffel, a Nazi war criminal in hiding.
22	"The Quetong Missile Mystery"	William D. Hamilton	February 11, 1965
While investigating the contamination of marine life in China, Dr. Quest discovers a secret missile base operated by a rogue general and protected by treetop-posted guards hidden deep within a local swamp. Note: The title card shows "The 'Q' Missile Mystery" for the 1964–65 season's re-run of this episode.
23	"The House of Seven Gargoyles"	Charles Hoffman	February 18, 1965
On a visit to the castle residence of a Norwegian fellow scientist, Dr. Quest must help protect his colleague's latest invention (the anti-gravity generator) from a cat-burglar disguised as one of a row of seven gargoyles on the roof who regularly breaks into the estate.
24	"Terror Island"	Story by: Doug Wildey; Teleplay by: Alan Dinehart and Herbert Finn	February 25, 1965
Dr. Quest is kidnapped by a rival scientist who needs help with his experiments to develop gigantic crab, spider, and lizard creatures at a secret Hong Kong-based laboratory compound. Note: The second appearance of Jade.
25	"Monster in the Monastery"	Charles Hoffman	March 4, 1965
During a trip to Nepal, the Quest encounter a band of terrorists disguised as Yetis who attempt to overthrow the local spiritual/government leader (a Dalai Lama-style figure), who is an old friend of Dr. Quest's.
26	"The Sea Haunt"	Charles Hoffman	March 11, 1965
Responding to a maritime distress signal in the Java Sea (east of Indonesia), the Quest group is stranded aboard an abandoned freighter ship with an amphibious humanoid.

All writing credits taken from Classic Jonny Quest.

See also The New Adventures of Jonny Quest.

== Merchandise ==
Items released in the United States during or shortly after the show's original run on ABC included:

- A simple substitution code ring was offered as a promotion by PF Flyers. The ring featured a movable code wheel, magnifying lens, signal flasher and a secret compartment. The code was implemented by a rotating circular inner code dial marked "ABCDEFGHIJKLMNOPQRSTUVWXYZ" and a fixed outer code marked "WEARPFSLQMYBUHXVCZNDKIOTGJ", i.e. "Wear PFs."
- Whitman released a Jonny Quest coloring book under two different covers in 1965.
- During the show's 1964–65 season, a Jonny Quest card game was produced and distributed in the United States by Milton Bradley and in Australia under license to John Sands Ltd.
- Milton Bradley also released six Jonny Quest puzzle sets in the United States, two apiece for three different age levels.
- Transogram produced three Jonny Quest coloring sets: paint-by-number, crayon-by-number and pencil-by-number.
- Transogram also released a Jonny Quest board game.
- Kenner released two different packages of its Give-A-Show projector in 1965 with different Jonny Quest slides. In 1969, it released a projector for short films, including a Jonny Quest cartridge.
- Hanna-Barbera records published a 28-minute audio story, "Jonny Quest in 20,000 Leagues Under the Sea", on an LP that featured a new version of the theme song by Shorty Rogers. There was a 7-inch 45 rpm record with an abbreviated version of the story, and another 45 titled "Favorite Songs of Jonny Quest", with the LP's theme song and other Hanna-Barbera music.

== Home media ==
Various episodes of the classic series have been released on VHS and DVD over the years.

On May 11, 2004, Warner Home Video released Jonny Quest: The Complete First Season on DVD in Region 1, which features all 26 episodes of the original series, although some have been edited for content, and nearly all episodes have incorrect closing credits.

On June 11, 2019, Warner Home Video (via the Warner Archive Collection) released the original 1960s Jonny Quest series on Blu-ray for the first time. For this release, a new, high-definition master was created, and the episodes were presented unedited and uncensored. The missing dialogue removed for the 2004 DVD version has been restored, but the audio has problems that were on the DVD set.

On October 27, 2016, La-La Land released a limited-edition 2-CD set of music from the series, including an extended version of the opening theme minus the sound effects.

== Appearances in other programs ==
- Jonny Quest and Hadji both appeared as elderly in the I Am Weasel episode "I Am My Lifetime".
- The characters appear in Harvey Birdman, Attorney at Law with Jonny Quest voiced by Dee Bradley Baker, Dr. Benton Quest voiced by Neil Ross, Race Bannon voiced by Thom Pinto, Hadji voiced by Wally Wingert, and Dr. Zin voiced by Billy West. In "Bannon Custody Trial", Dr. Zin uses a robot stand-in for Race in a scheme to sue Dr. Quest for custody of Jonny and Hadji. His plan is foiled by Harvey Birdman who explains how Zin was working on his scheme while posing as a female court reporter. Zin is then arrested by the police and it is revealed that the real Race was on vacation. In "Return of Birdgirl", Race Bannon and Dr. Quest are attempting to get gay marriage recognized by the Justices League, a combination of the Justice League of America and the Supreme Court of the United States.
- The Adult Swim animated series The Venture Bros. is a parody of Jonny Quest and similar adventure series, and has also used the original characters – or thinly veiled versions of them – as guest characters.
- Characters from Jonny Quest appeared in the Scooby-Doo! Mystery Incorporated episodes "Pawn of Shadows" and "Heart of Evil" with Dr. Benton Quest and Dr. Zin voiced by Eric Bauza and Race Bannon voiced by Christopher Corey Smith. Dr. Quest was responsible for the origin of Dynomutt while Dr. Zin was also depicted as an enemy of Blue Falcon.
- In 2015, a crossover with Tom and Jerry titled Tom and Jerry: Spy Quest was released with Jonny Quest voiced by Reese Hartwig, Hadji voiced by Arnie Pantoja, Dr. Benton Quest voiced again by Eric Bauza, Race Bannon voiced by Michael Hanks, and Dr. Zin voiced by James Hong. Tom and Jerry joined forces with the Jonny Quest cast and even Droopy who helped Jade to stop an evil cat army from stealing Dr. Benton Quest's newest invention for Dr. Zin.
- An episode of the series is briefly shown in a scene of the 2018 film, Incredibles 2, set in a retro-futuristic version of the 1960s.
- Dr. Benton Quest appears in the 2020 film Scoob! in a non-speaking cameo in the end credits, shown to be working for the Blue Falcon.
- Jonny Quest and Hadji appear in Jellystone!, voiced by Andrew Frankel and Fajer Al-Kaisi. The characters are adults in this series and are also the owners of a bowling alley called "Quest Bowl". Unlike the original cartoon, Jonny and Hadji are not adoptive brothers and are depicted as an "implicit" couple. Race Bannon appears in the two-part episode "Snowdodio", voiced by Diedrich Bader.
- Jonny Quest and Race Bannon appeared in the 2021 special Scooby-Doo, Where Are You Now!
- Jonny Quest appeared in the Teen Titans Go! episodes "Warner Bros. 100th Anniversary" and "Favorite Animated Show Nominee".

== See also ==
- List of works produced by Hanna-Barbera Productions
- List of Hanna-Barbera characters
- List of children's animated television series of the 1960s
