= Linda Kahn =

American television executive (1948–2021)

- Born: September 15, 1948; Chicago, Illinois, U.S.
- Died: August 30, 2021 (aged 72); New York, U.S.
- Occupation: Television executive

Linda M. Kahn (September 15, 1948 – August 30, 2021) was an American television executive. She held senior posts at Nickelodeon and Scholastic Media, and was president of the board of the New York Women in Film & Television (NYWIFT).

== Early life ==
Kahn was born in Chicago, the daughter of Albert Kahn and Estelle Bain Kahn. Her family was Jewish. She graduated from Washington University in St. Louis in 1970, and earned a master's degree in education at Boston University.

== Career ==
Kahn taught school in Massachusetts after college. In the 1980s she was vice-president of acquisitions at Nickelodeon, and helped to launch Nick at Nite, a popular evening package of original shows and old sitcoms, targeted at Baby Boomers and their families. "It's upbeat programming, slightly nostalgic and a little bit whimsical", she explained in a 1985 interview. She introduced programming including Ren & Stimpy, Rugrats, and Doug to international markets. At Scholastic Media from 1995 to 2008, she was responsible for international promotion and brand development for Goosebumps, Clifford the Big Red Dog, Maya & Miguel, Stellaluna, the Magic School Bus, Animorphs, and WordGirl.

Kahn was president of the board of the New York Women in Film & Television (NYWIFT) from 2003 to 2005. In 2008 she gave an oral history interview for NYWIFT's Archive Project, and began her own consulting firm, Linda Kahn Media. Beginning in 2010, Kahn worked with Bridge Media to create educational children's programming for blind and disabled students. She was active in leadership with the New York chapter of Susan G. Komen for the Cure, a breast cancer charity, and served on the New York board of BAFTA.

== Personal life ==
Kahn was married to Christopher Gordon for 29 years, until she died in New York City, from breast cancer, in 2021, aged 72 years. In tribute, the New York Institute for Special Education established a Linda Kahn Afterschool Fund. Her college papers, including records of her anti-war activism and her semester abroad in London, are in the collection of the Washington University Archives.
