= Dário de Castro =

Brazilian voice actor (1948–2021)

- Born: Dário Campos Penha Castro; 28 November 1948; Rio de Janeiro, Rio de Janeiro, Brazil
- Died: 15 April 2021 (aged 72); Rio de Janeiro, Rio de Janeiro, Brazil
- Occupations: Voice actor; voice director

Dário de Castro (28 November 1948 – 15 April 2021) was a Brazilian voice actor and voice director. Castro was known for dubbing the parts of actors like Russell Crowe, Dolph Lundgren and Liam Neeson.

== Life and career ==
Castro acted in works such as Pocahontas, The Hunchback of Notre Dame and Justice League. He died at the age of 72, in Rio de Janeiro due to complications from COVID-19.
