= Fish Police (TV series) =

American adult animated television series

- Genre: Comedy; Police procedural
- Based on: Fish Police by Steve Moncuse
- Developed by: Jeanne Romano
- Voices of: John Ritter; Héctor Elizondo; Ed Asner; Jonathan Winters; Tim Curry; Robert Guillaume; Buddy Hackett; Megan Mullally; JoBeth Williams; Frank Welker; Georgia Brown; Charlie Schlatter
- Theme music composer: James Horner
- Composer: Steve Bramson
- Country of origin: United States
- No. of seasons: 1
- No. of episodes: 6 (list of episodes)

Production
- Producers: Melissa Goldsmith; Larry Huber; Don Rhymer; Jeanne Romano; Paul Sabella; David Kirschner; Benjamin Melniker; Michael E. Uslan
- Production company: Hanna-Barbera, Inc. (Note: Animation outsourced to Fil-Cartoons, Mr. Big Cartoons, Karen Johnson Productions and Jaime Diaz Studios.)

Original release
- Network: CBS
- Release: February 28 – June 16, 1992

Fish Police is an American adult animated private eye television series produced by Hanna-Barbera for CBS. It is based on the comic book series of the same name created by Steve Moncuse. It first aired in 1992, broadcasting six episodes before being axed for low ratings.

The show has a decidedly more mature tone than most other animated Hanna-Barbera shows. Episodes often contained innuendo and mild profanity.

The series was part of a spate of attempts by major networks to develop prime time animated shows to compete with the success of Fox's The Simpsons, alongside ABC's Capitol Critters (also produced by Hanna-Barbera) and CBS's Family Dog. Hanna-Barbera Productions pitched the series to CBS Entertainment, which agreed to pick it up. All three were canceled in their first seasons.

== Plot ==
Beneath the ocean, a fish named Inspector Gil works for his police department under Chief Abalone. He solves the various crimes in his city while tangling with Biscotti Calamari.

== Cast ==
- John Ritter as Inspector Gil
- Ed Asner as Chief Abalone
- Georgia Brown as Goldie
- Tim Curry as Sharkster
- Héctor Elizondo as Calamari
- Robert Guillaume as Detective Catfish
- Buddy Hackett as Crabby
- Megan Mullally as Pearl
- Charlie Schlatter as Tadpole
- Frank Welker as Mussels Marinara
- JoBeth Williams as Angel
- Jonathan Winters as Mayor Cod

Fish Police characters and their voice actors from left to right: Angel Jones voiced by JoBeth Williams, Crabby voiced by Buddy Hackett, Chief Abalone voiced by Ed Asner, and Det. Catfish voiced by Robert Guillaume

== Characters ==
=== Main characters ===
- Inspector Gil (voiced by John Ritter) is the main protagonist of the series. Gil is a detective in a similar mold of classic film noir stylings. He sees things as very black and white, demonstrated by his "good/bad" narratives during episodes. He has been in a relationship with Pearl for five years (to which some have joked that they should have been married by now) and maintains a flirtatious "friendship" with Angel. Dialogue in the first episode implies that he is friends with several other fictional characters such as Fred Flintstone and Kermit the Frog.
- Biscotti Calamari (voiced by Héctor Elizondo) is a squid crime boss who keeps his operations extremely discreet. He is confident that the police can never touch him for any of his crimes and even appears to contribute towards them occasionally, believing it is better to be on their good side should he ever need them. This has led Gil, Catfish, and Abalone to take a great disliking to him and his methods.
- Sharkster (voiced by Tim Curry) is Calamari's sleazy, smooth-talking shark lawyer. He is quick to defend his client in whatever way possible, but does so in the slimiest of manners, seemingly knowing that his client can commit any crime and get away with it. Sharkster frequently uses his knowledge of the law to cause headaches and obstacles for Gil, causing the two to dislike each other greatly. Tim Curry and John Ritter had previously co-starred together in 1990 in It and later in a 1997 episode of Over the Top. The two remained good friends until Ritter's death.
- Mussels Marinara (voiced by Frank Welker) is Calamari's dim-witted and overweight bodyguard.
- Chief Abalone (voiced by Ed Asner) is an angry, ill-tempered chief of police at Gil's precinct. He appears to dislike his staff, but secretly has faith in them, particularly in Gil.
- Mayor Cod (voiced by Jonathan Winters) is, as his title implies, the Mayor of Fish City. Despite this however, he is rather cowardly and somewhat inept when it comes to his job.
- Detective Catfish (voiced by Robert Guillaume) is an undercover officer at Gil's precinct. He has known Gil for quite some time and they appear to be good friends, demonstrated when he is visibly saddened when Gil is sent to prison for crimes committed by an impostor. Among his disguises, he occasionally dresses in drag. His design is identical to Gil's appearance in the original comics.
- Crabby (voiced by Buddy Hackett) is an old, bitter crab taxi driver who frequents Pearl's diner as well as other areas Gil visits. He occasionally offers helpful information to related cases of Gil's during his rantings.
- Pearl White (voiced by Megan Mullally) is the owner of her own diner that Gil frequents; she is also his main love interest, with them having been in an on-again, off-again relationship for 5 years. She often wishes for Gil to become a more exciting person as she feels their relationship has become predictable. She finds a rival in Angel, getting jealous of her constant flirting with Gil.
- Angel Jones (voiced by JoBeth Williams) is the lead singer at Calamari's club and another love interest for Gil. Despite his protests in the first episode that they are just friends, Angel strongly hints at being interested in Gil with her constant seductive flirting with him throughout the entire series. She has a very voluptuous figure and seems to be extremely inspired by Jessica Rabbit. The series itself makes note of this in the first episode, where she parodies Jessica's infamous "I'm not bad..." line.
- Goldie (voiced by Georgia Brown) is the secretary of the police station. Goldie is a widow, having been married at least 5 times. She usually makes very dry, witty, and sarcastic remarks towards her colleagues.
- Tadpole (voiced by Charlie Schlatter) is Pearl's younger brother who works at the precinct with Gil. He usually seems to know exactly what Gil or anyone else is thinking whenever he is given an order (a running gag in the series is a character wondering aloud, "How does [he] do that?!") and seems to work in forensics.
- Connie Koi is a news reporter and she often shows up to provide exposition.

=== Guest characters ===
- Inspector C. Bass (voiced by Phil Hartman) is a casanova of a cop who is transferred to Fish Police and partnered with Gil to investigate the smuggling of gold bullion. He is secretly corrupt.
- The Codfather is a high-ranking mob boss on the run from FBI agents for unpaid taxes. He stages his own murder and frames Calamari for it, but his ego proves to be his downfall.
  - Julius Kelp is one of the Codfather's subordinates who helps him forge his death certificate.
- Bill (voiced by John Ritter) is a small-time thug who resembles Gil. Calamari performs plastic surgery on him to make him into a doppelgänger for Gil and to serve as a mole for him.
- The Widow Casino (voiced by B. J. Ward) is a socialite who conspires with Calamari to murder her husband, Clams Casino, but later tricked by Gil into thinking Calamari betrayed her (which he had).
- Richie (voiced by Rob Paulsen) is Calamari's favorite nephew. He is intelligent and shares his uncle's business acumen, while his two younger brothers, Buddy and Elvis, are the exact opposite.
- Donna (voiced by Kimmy Robertson) is a waitress working for Calamari who begins committing robberies to gain Calamari's approval.
- W. K. the Weenie King (voiced by George Hearn) is the host of the annual Fish City Beauty Contest and an idol of Gil's since his childhood.
- Shelly is the original "Waltzing Weenie". After 20 years of service, W. K. fires her because she "couldn't cut the mustard" anymore, driving her to a life of crime.
- Father Fluke is the man who knows everything about everyone alive or dead. He is one of Gil's sources for information.

== Episodes ==
No.	Title	Written by	Original release date
1	"The Shell Game"	Jeanne Romano	February 28, 1992
A wealthy casino owner, Clams Casino, is found murdered, and Angel is the primary suspect. Gil, however, senses something more sinister behind the murder, suspecting a link between Calamari and Clams's widow.
2	"A Fish Out of Water"	Jeanne Romano	March 6, 1992
Gil is partnered with a new Casanova of a cop, Inspector C. Bass, much to his chagrin. When their first investigation together goes bust, Gil becomes convinced that Bass, despite his clean record, is on the take.
3	"Beauty's Only Fin Deep"	Michele Gendelman & Bonnie DeSouza	March 13, 1992
A beauty contest nears Fish City, with the grand prize being a year's worth of holidays, and a jealous Pearl immediately schemes to ensure Angel wins the contest. Meanwhile, a bitter assassin begins targeting the competitors.
4	"The Codfather"	Story by Don Rhymer, written by Michele Gendelman & Bonnie DeSouza	April 4, 1992
A high-ranking mob boss, the Codfather, is found murdered shortly after attempting to "do business" with Calamari, with one of Calamari's signature napkins on the crime scene. Calamari is arrested, but Gil begins to voice doubts about Calamari's guilt when the Codfather's tax records come up.
5	"The Two Gils"	Barbara Davilman	May 5, 1992
Calamari employs Bill, a doppelgänger for Gil, to impersonate the real Inspector Gil and take his place in Fish Police as his mole, but things start to get complicated when Gil's personal life and Bill's greed are involved.
6	"No Way to Treat a Fillet-dy"	Michele Gendelman & Bonnie DeSouza	June 16, 1992
Calamari brings his three nephews to Fish City, and around the same time, a mugger steals the Charity Ball savings from Goldie. Gil turns his eyes to Calamari's nephews, but they appear to be innocent after they and Calamari are robbed, while having to deal with accidentally having asked both Pearl and Angel to the Charity Ball.

== Critical reception ==
Critics' opinions were mixed to negative. Ken Tucker of Entertainment Weekly gave the show a "C", saying that the "comics are a lot more varied and better constructed — their plots worked as mysteries, whereas here the stories are just excuses for more fish humor". Marion Garmel of The Indianapolis Star thought that the show lacked the "dark edge" of the comics. In a 2010 interview, Moncuse said of the show: "The less said about the animated series the better".

== See also ==
- List of works produced by Hanna-Barbera Productions
- Sharky & George - French-Canadian animated series about a pair of fish detectives.
