= Grace Huntington =

American cartoonist

- Born: Grace Goodhue Huntington; March 23, 1913; Springfield, Massachusetts, U.S.
- Died: June 3, 1948 (aged 35); Los Angeles County, California, U.S.
- Known for: Animation, Aviation
- Spouse: Berkeley Brandt Jr. (m. 1941)

Grace Goodhue Huntington (March 23, 1913 – June 3, 1948) was an American aviator and animator. As a pilot, she achieved a record altitude in her Taylorcraft light airplane of 24,310.975 ft. in 1940. She was the second woman hired into Disney's lead animation department, after Retta Scott. The animation techniques she created have been replicated globally.

== Biography ==
=== Early life ===
Huntington was born in Springfield, Massachusetts, the daughter of Rev. Dr. Harwood Huntington, a chemist turned Episcopalian minister, and Grace Beecher Goodhue. She was educated at Marlborough School Rosemary Hall in Greenwich, Connecticut, Scripps College Pomona, Sorbonne, Paris

Huntington was an avid reader of fantasy books as a young girl. Of Journey to the Center of the Earth by Jules Verne, she said, “That book left me with an unquenchable desire to someday, in some way, bring the dream of a trip to space a little closer to reality.”

=== Aviation career ===
Huntington learned to pilot at Joe Plosser's flight school at Grand Central Air Terminal in Glendale. Upon earning her private license, she would go on to work for Plosser, who eventually introduced her to altitude flight.

During her time as a pilot, Huntington noted a significant amount of misogyny in the aviation business. She examined many issues, such as what kind of clothing to wear in cold air, how to tell when an airplane had reached its ceiling, what kind of oxygen equipment to use, and how to use it. Huntington also revolutionized the supplies that most people took up in their aircraft. She switched tools and first aid kits for a sensitive altimeter. In 1939 on a test flight, Huntington's windshield cracked when she took her plane past 20,000 feet. Luckily she was able to maneuver the plane back down to the ground. In 1939, she set the women's record for flight when she reached 18,770 feet in her brother's Fairchild 24 nicknamed The Blue Dragon. Huntington's big altitude record came in 1940 where she climbed her Taylorcraft to 22,700 feet.

The record for flight with a Taylorcraft at that point was 18,000 feet, and Huntington was confident that she could beat that. During the flight, she was able to destroy that record by climbing to 24,310.975 feet.

=== Animation career ===
In 1936, Huntington became the second woman hired to work in Disney's lead animation department. In her first days at Disney, she was the target of sexist harassment from her male co-workers, who would often prevent her from entering story meetings. Huntington recalled Walt Disney himself saying, "I would never consider hiring a woman for the animation department because when she was married she would be a total loss to the studio.” At her initial hiring, she was an avid writer of short cartoons and her animation concepts would become key to Mickey and Minnie Mouse cartoons as well as the Silly Symphonies. After a few months of working for the studio, Huntington gained credibility among her coworkers by being heavily involved in the creation and design of characters and landscapes within Snow White. Huntington also quickly became an advocate for the hiring of other women, such as Dorothy Ann Blake.

Huntington's sketches of her time at Disney have become an inspiration for many, including ones of her going into a meeting with her coworkers in a full suit of armor. There have also been multiple books written about Huntington's time at Disney, such as They Drew As They Pleased, The Queens of Animation and her own autobiography called Please Let Me Fly.

=== Personal life ===
In 1941, Huntington married Berkeley Brandt Jr., who was also an avid flyer. They took many lessons together in Southern California. Berkeley Brandt Jr. became a prominent flyer for Panam. They had one son together, Brandt Jr., who later published her autobiography, Please Let me Fly, on her life as “anything but a stereotypical woman”.

Huntington died from tuberculosis in 1948, at the age of 35.

Please Let Me Fly is the life story of Grace Huntington, published posthumously by her son. The published book includes lost documents, letters, and photos.

== See also ==
- Mary Blair
- Martha Sigall
- Bessie Coleman
- Amy Johnson
- Jacqueline Cochran
- Evelyn Kennedy
