= Suzy Williams =

American singer-songwriter

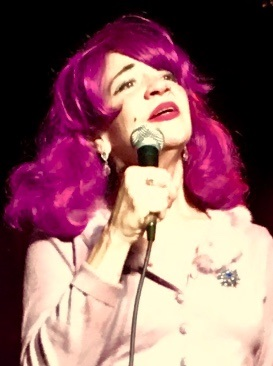
- Williams in 2018

Background information
- Born: Susan Dimiti Williams; September 7, 1953 (age 72); Oakland, California
- Genres: Jazz, boogie woogie, blues, folk
- Occupation: Singer-songwriter
- Years active: 1972–present
- Formerly of: Stormin' Norman & Suzy, Suzy & Her Solid Senders, Steve Weisberg Orchestra
- Spouse: Gerry Fialka
- Website: laughtears.com

Susan Dimiti "Suzy" Williams is an American singer-songwriter. She became well known through the musical duo Stormin’ Norman & Suzy. Williams has performed at venues ranging from Carnegie Hall and Lincoln Center to the Hotel Palmas in the Canary Islands, and on network television and film. She has been reviewed in publications including Rolling Stone, The New York Times, Cosmopolitan, and Los Angeles Magazine. Her singing was referred to in Rolling Stone as a "mixture of Bessie Smith, Sophie Tucker, and perhaps a trace of Janis Joplin".

== Early life ==
Williams was born in Oakland, California, and raised in Gridley, California by her mother, Barbara Artie King Liggett, an artist, pianist, and torch singer. Her father, David P. Williams, was a social worker and organizer who worked with Cesar Chavez and Ralph Nader, and also performed professionally as a comedian in San Francisco in the early 1950s.

Williams started singing professionally following high school, mainly influenced by Harry Nilsson, Randy Newman, and especially Bessie Smith. Her later influences include singers June Christy and Anita O'Day.

== Career ==
=== East Coast US ===
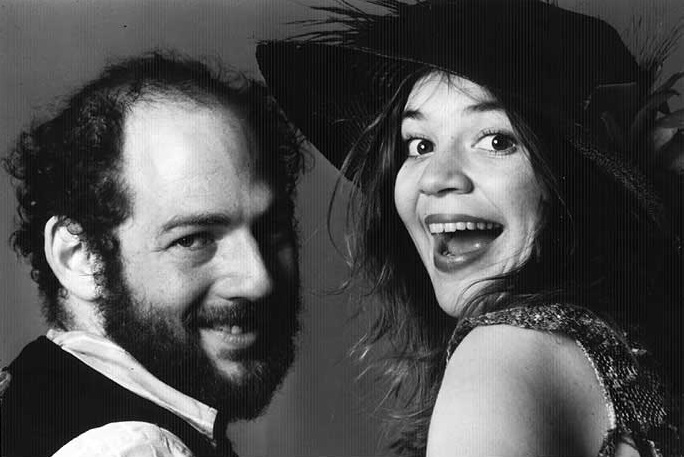
Norman Zamcheck and Williams of the duo Stormin' Norman & Suzy in 1978

At eighteen years old, Williams moved to Boston, Massachusetts and met "Stormin’ Norman" Zamcheck, a composer and boogie-woogie piano player with a degree in literature from Yale University. As a musical duo, they created a "rag'n'roll" style, combining boogie-woogie, blues, rock, and jazz. Together they toured the U.S. east coast for 12 years, eventually playing Carnegie Hall and receiving favorable reviews from the New York Times, Rolling Stone, and Cosmopolitan. Stormin’ Norman & Suzy, primarily managed by Bruce Hambro, were signed with Polydor Records in 1977 by co-manager Sid Bernstein.

Williams's singing in Stormin’ Norman & Suzy has been called a "mixture of Bessie Smith, Sophie Tucker, and perhaps a trace of Janis Joplin". Jazz musicians Horace Silver, Roosevelt Sykes, and Hadda Brooks have complimented her. Jazz pianist and composer Eubie Blake paid Williams an inspiring compliment in a handwritten letter: “I heard alot [sic] of white women try to imitate negroid singing, but you are the only one who has it down pat."

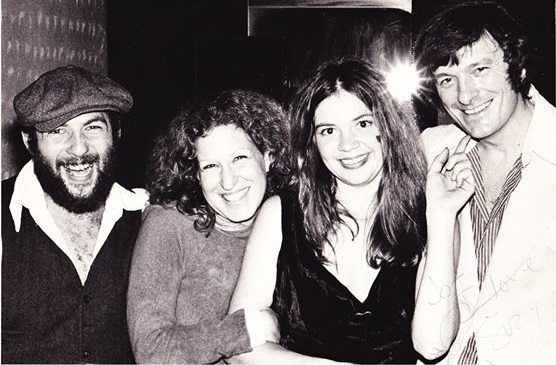
Bette Midler came to see Stormin’ Norman & Suzy at Tramps nightclub in 1976. Left to right: Norman Zamcheck, Midler, Suzy Williams, Tramps proprietor Terry Dunne

Guitarists who have played with Stormin' Norman & Suzy include Marc Ribot, Mark Shulman, and Jeff Golub. Stormin’ Norman & Suzy was the house band for three years at New York City's Tramps night club, and have appeared on network television shows including Gabe Kaplan Presents the Future Stars and Don Kirshner's Rock Concert. The band has also performed with the Pilobolus Dance Company, who choreographed a dance based on Williams’ movements. The band embarked on an international tour in 1979. In 1983, they had a two-month residency at the Hotel Palmas in the Canary Islands. Stormin' Norman & Suzy continue to tour together occasionally.

Williams also worked independently singing with pop singer, songwriter, and actor David Johansen, a.k.a. Buster Poindexter of the New York Dolls. In the 1980s she starred on the off-Broadway stage with Sam Rockwell and Natasha Schulman in Bruno's Donuts: Dementos, written by Marc Shaiman and Robert I. Rubinsky; and in Dames in Hoagland, with Cathy Chamberlain and produced by Jerry Wexler.

In 1986 Williams formed a duo with her then-husband Bill Burnett as The Boners and performed regularly at Heather Woodbury's Cafe Bustelo in New York City. They also played with They Might Be Giants in Williamsburg, Brooklyn, New York City. Williams and Burnett's melodic neo-cabaret folk-rock style culminated in "Our Show" held at the West Beth Theater and a local Public Access Cable TV comedy-music show "The Boners Show". Their radio show for kids, "The Flying Kitchen", aired in New York City. They toured with James Sewall and Sally Rousse in The New York Song and Dance Ensemble, performing at Lincoln Center. They have played the Sweet Chariot Music and Arts Festival in Swans Island, Maine every year since 1986.

=== West Coast US ===
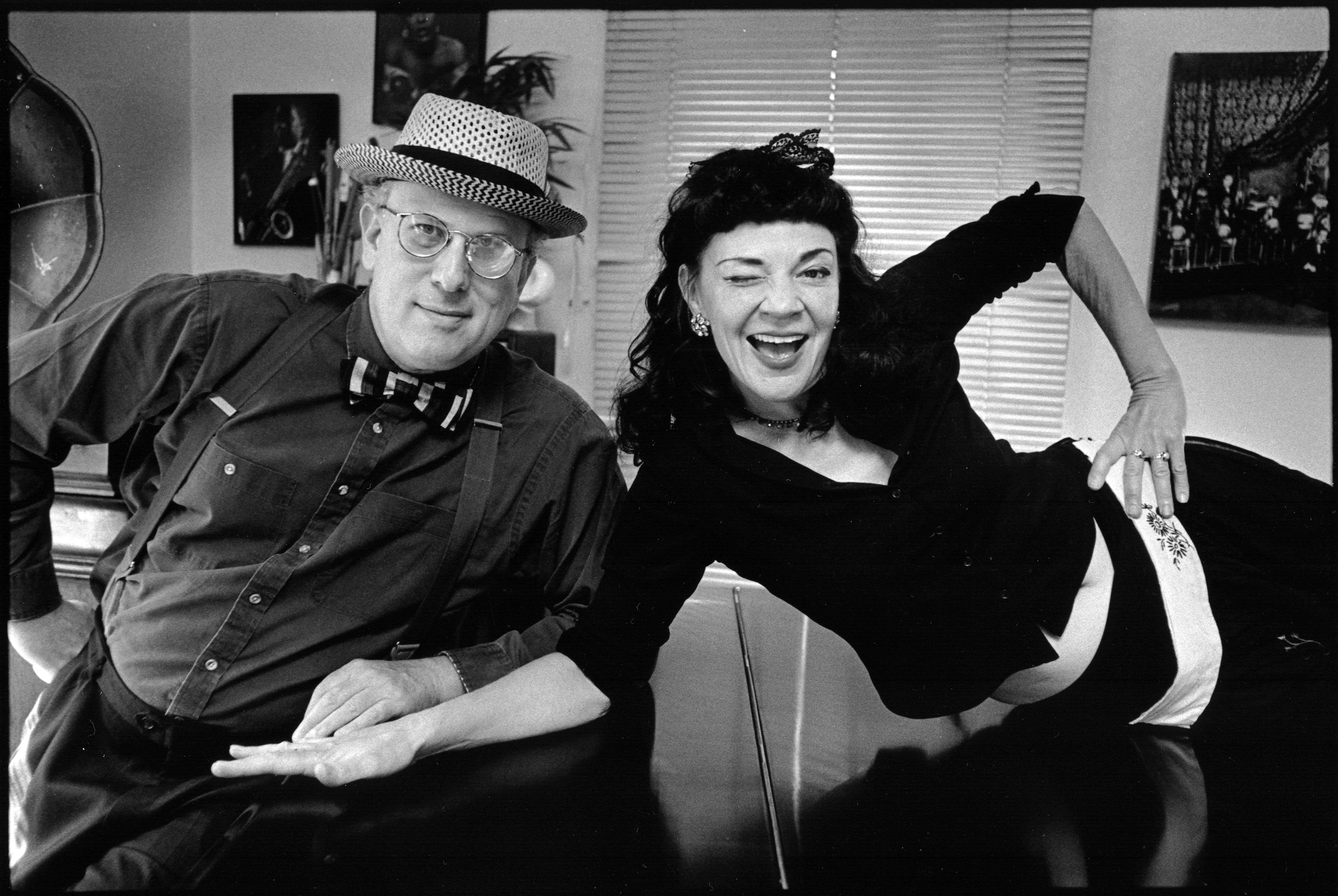
Brad Kay and Suzy Williams. Photo: David Healey

Williams moved to Los Angeles in 1994 and started her solo jazz torch singing career with pianist Tommy Mars from Frank Zappa’s band. She later performed with Van Dyke Parks, Brian Woodbury, and Bruce Langhorne (from Bob Dylan’s band). In 1996, she began a nightclub act with accordionist Nick Ariondo. Their monthly residency ran for ten years at the Genghis Cohen club in Hollywood. Joined by vibes player Kahlil Sabbagh, their diverse repertoire included cool jazz, hot torch, Spanish, French, Portuguese, and classical music.

In 2002, Williams joined pianist/singer/composer Brad Kay, portraying singer Sophie Tucker and her pianist Ted Shapiro in "An Evening with Sophie Tucker." She began writing original songs, often in collaboration with Kay, and has since written over 100 of them. Williams and Kay together direct and star in "The Lit Show" that has been a popular annual event at Beyond Baroque Literary Arts Center in Venice, Los Angeles since 2006. The show, produced by Williams's husband, Gerry Fialka, features a survey of songs based on the writings of classic literature authors.

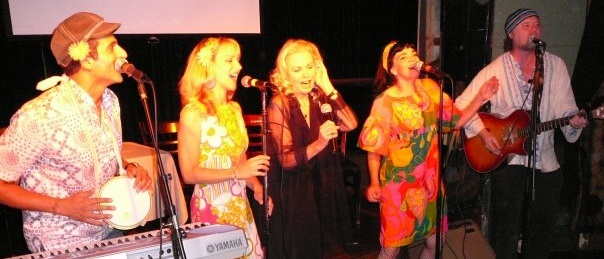
Michelle Phillips, formerly of The Mamas & the Papas, joined the Backboners for a song in 2008. Left to right: Kahlil Sabbagh, Ginger Smith, Phillips, Suzy Williams, and her first husband Bill Burnett

In 2004 Williams and now-ex-husband Bill Burnett joined with married couple Ginger Smith and Kahlil Sabbagh to expand The Boners into The Backboners, with four-part harmonies reminiscent of The Mamas & the Papas. Williams and composer-pianist-conductor Steve Weisberg started performing both original songs and pop hits together in 2007. That same year, Williams created a jump-blues 8-piece jazz band named Suzy & Her Solid Senders, performing music from the big-band era, but mostly Williams's original songs in the style of that era. She also sings regularly with actress Mews Small, and the two have written songs together. Williams has performed twice at Catalina Jazz Club, "one of the prime jazz venues in Los Angeles".

=== Film appearances ===
Songs including "Bless The Family" by Stormin' Norman & Suzy appear on the soundtrack for We Can't Go Home Again, an experimental 1976 film by Nicholas Ray, and in the 2011 documentary Don't Expect Too Much by Susan Ray.

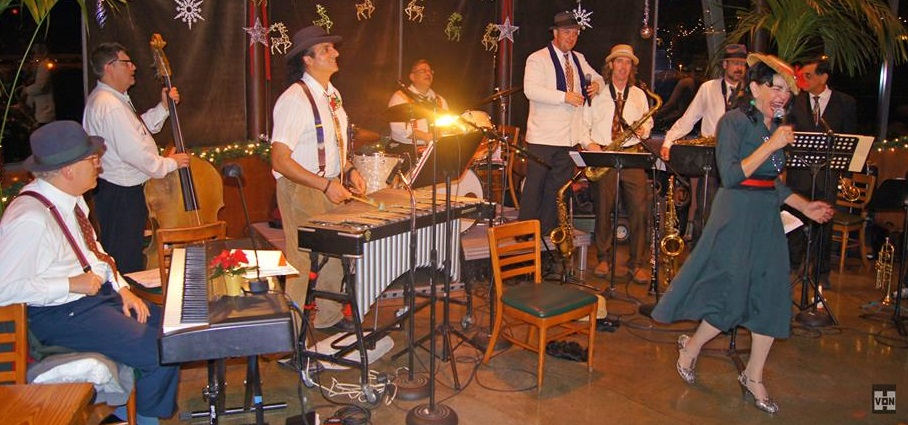
Suzy & Her Solid Senders in 2013. Left to right: Brad Kay, Dave Jones, Kahlil Sabbagh, Nick Scarmack, Doug Roegiers, Danny Moynahan, Dan Heffernan, Suzy Williams, George Pandis.

Williams has appeared in several experimental films by Gerry Fialka, including some made in collaboration with Mark X. Farina and Bruno Kohfield-Galeano, the feature film The Brother Side of the Wake, and others made using a PXL-2000 toy camera as part of the PXL THIS Film Festival. Her voice-over work and singing have been featured in many cartoons by Bill Burnett, including Cow and Chicken and ChalkZone. The 2015 film Roseanne for President! documenting Roseanne Barr’s run for the U.S. Presidency in 2012 includes footage of a campaign organized by the Peace and Freedom Party in Venice, Los Angeles where Roseanne gave a speech. Williams appears in that footage singing the campaign song "Roseanne Barr None" that she co-wrote with Brad Kay and Brian Woodbury. Williams turned down the title role in the 1979 film The Rose, and suggested it to Bette Midler, who took the role.

=== Journalism ===
Williams's interviews with jazz pioneers Hadda Brooks, Horace Silver, Jon Hendricks, and Oscar Brown, Jr. have been published in Los Angeles Jazz Scene and Jazz News. She interviewed playwright/performer Heather Woodbury in Flipside Magazine. She regularly reviews local theatrical plays for the Venice Beachhead newspaper.

== Personal life ==
Williams is a professional cook, yoga teacher, and political activist for local causes and the Peace and Freedom Party. She married Bill Burnett, then of the band Long Tall Sally, in 1977. In 2001 she married Gerry Fialka, a lecturer on experimental film, avant-garde art, and subversive social media. They live in Venice, Los Angeles, California, and were the featured couple in the July 2020 edition of Venice Living magazine.

== Musical ensembles ==
- Stormin' Norman & Suzy (since 1972) with Norman Zamcheck (piano), Dave Stringham (saxophone), Bobo Lavorgna (bass guitar), and Tom McDonald (drums)
- The Boners (since 1986) with Bill Burnett (guitar)
- Ariondo & Williams (1996–2006) with Nick Ariondo (accordion) & Kahlil Sabbagh (vibraphone)
- Suzy Williams & Brad Kay (piano) (since 2002)
- The Off-Their-Jingle-Bell Rockers (since 2003) with Catherine Allison, Kathy Leonardo (guitar), Marianne Lewis, Jon Eric Preston, Rory Johnston, and Mikal Sandoval
- The Smiling Minks (2004–2006) with Moira Smiley and Vessy Mink
- The Backboners (since 2004) with Bill Burnett (guitar), Ginger Smith (vocals), and Kahlil Sabbagh (keyboard, percussion)
- Suzy & Her Solid Senders (since 2007) with Kahlil Sabbagh (Music Director, vibraphone), Dan Weinstein (Arranger, trombone), Tim Moynahan (trombone), Brad Kay (piano), Danny Moynahan (tenor saxophone), Dan Heffernan (baritone saxophone), Corey Gemme (trumpet), George Pandis (trumpet), Charlie Unkeless (trumpet), Dave Jones (stand-up bass), Freddie Johnson (stand-up bass), Nick Scarmack (drums), and Douglas Roegiers (vocals)
- Suzy Williams & Steve Weisberg (piano) (since 2007)
- The Nicknamers (since 2011) with Sam Clay (guitar) and Eric Ahlberg (stand-up bass)
- Suzy Williams (guest vocalist) with the Steve Weisberg Orchestra (18-piece) (since 2012)
- Suzy Williams & Michael Jost (classical guitar) (since 2015)

== Discography ==
- 1975, Fantasy Rag – Stormin’ Norman & Suzy, Perfect Crime Productions PCPS 10001
- 1978, Ocean of Love – Stormin' Norman & Suzy, Polydor Records PD 1–6116
- 1989, Say Hello with Mr. & Mrz. Burnett – The Boners, There Must Be a Pony Records
- 2000, Brian Woodbury Songbook – Brian Woodbury with guest vocalist Suzy Williams on "Hippies Rise!", Some Phil Records 634479640629
- 2005, Spine – The Backboners, Fun Chasers Records
- 2008, We Dreamed It All – The Backboners, Fun Chasers Records
- 2009, Live at the P & G Bar – Stormin' Norman & Suzy, Abaraki Records
- 2010, Enjoy The Ride – Suzy Williams, Superbatone Records (with album cover shot by famed rock music photographer Guy Webster, known for such renowned covers as If You Can Believe Your Eyes and Ears)
- 2011, Music in the First Degree – Suzy Williams & Her Solid Senders, Superbatone Records
- 2019, Bravo! – Suzy Williams & Michael Jost, Breakwater Records 888295870160

== Video clips ==
- Stormin' Norman & Suzy perform his original song "Ocean of Love" at the Paradise Theatre in Boston, opening for Tom Waits, 1977
- Williams with then-husband Bill Burnett on their comedy-music show "The Boners Show" on local New York City Public Access Cable TV, 1987
- Williams with Nick Ariondo (accordion) at Genghis Cohen in Los Angeles, 1999
- Williams sings her original songs "Get an Older Man Darling!" and "Waltz Around the Poolroom" with Brad Kay (piano) and Dan Weinstein (violin), at Mikal Sandoval's Speakeasy Night at The Talking Stick in Venice, California, 2009
- Williams sings her original song "Make Me Wine" with Brad Kay (piano), at SNAP (Sunday Night at the Pavilion with Harriet Schock & Friends), 2015
- Williams sings her original song "I Will Not Go into that Good Night (Without a Good Fight)" with Brad Kay (piano), at Don the Beachcomber in Huntington Beach, California, 2018
- Williams sings her original song co-written with Mews Small "Do You Think of Me?" with Brad Kay (piano), Oliver Steinberg (bass), John S. Reynolds (guitar), shot and edited by Bruno Kohfield-Galeano at Surfside, Venice, California, 2018
