= Me & Rubyfruit =

- Directed by: Sadie Benning
- Release date: 1989
- Running time: 5 minutes
- Country: United States
- Language: English

Me and Rubyfruit is a short 1989/1990 videorecording by American artist Sadie Benning that runs for 5 minutes and was recorded with PixelVision camera in black and white. The title alludes to Rubyfruit Jungle, a 1973 novel by Rita Mae Brown that has explicitly lesbian themes.

== About ==
The video bears the signature features of PixelVision: It is black and white and the image is grainy, fuzzy, and contained within a solid black frame. These hallmark characteristics are why PixelVision has been recognized for an erotic, tactile visuality which complements the video's erotic subject matter.

Issues of female sexuality, and whether or not homoerotic desires can be reconciled with mainstream culture and normative gender roles are explored in the video. The dialogue, presented alternately through spoken words and hand-written quotations on scraps of paper, questions whether or not sapphic attraction is acceptable, and depending on the answer to this, what the future holds for lesbian relationships.

The dialogue is an almost word-for-word recreation of a conversation between Molly Bolt, the protagonist of Rubyfruit Jungle with whom Benning identified, and her first girlfriend, Leota. The story is told in the style of a video-diary, through which Benning came out, though it is unclear to what extent the video constitutes an autobiography or memoir. This is Benning's "first video to be overtly presented as a coming-out narrative." Spoken dialogue is often paired with close-up shots of Benning's eye, while shots of written text pan from left to right, so that at each moment the viewer can read only a portion of what is written on the paper; the movement of the camera mimics the movement of the eye when reading. The dialogue is not attributed to its speakers in the book, nor are they distinguished by medium; both girls' lines appear in written and spoken word. For this reason, the video's dialogue has also been interpreted as an internal conversation between two parts of Sadie herself, one that is more traditional and one that is more rebellious.

As in other Sadie Benning videos, such as Girl Power, the video is shot in her bedroom which has been said to create an intimate safe space apart from the Heterosexism of the mainstream media and the real world; though there is a tension between the protective shelter of Benning's bedroom and the exposure of her body through close ups of her eyes, hands, and ears. Mainstream media only surfaces when the camera pans over sexualized photos of heterosexual couples, muscular men, and phone sex ads and snippets of heteronormative love songs, including Your Cheatin' Heart, Darling Nikki, (You Make Me Feel Like) A Natural Woman, Get Up Offa That Thing, and Mardi Gras Mambo.
