= Bill Burnett (writer) =

American singer-songwriter

Bill Burnett is an American writer, composer, television producer, singer-songwriter, and actor who is best known for co-creating Nickelodeon's ChalkZone along with Larry Huber. He is also the lead vocalist of the LA-based band the Backboners.

== Career ==
Burnett's earliest career success was working with Patti LuPone and a dozen other significant Broadway talents in 1984 on "Hip Pocket Musicals", the pilot for a series of short musicals produced for PBS. He also starred as political folksinger Phil Ochs in a play (Small Circle of Friends) and later a documentary film (Chords of Fame) which featured a veritable who's who of 60s activists and protest singers. Lupone also covered "I Regret Everything", a cheeky send-up of Edith Piaf's classic "Je Ne Regret Rien", penned by Burnett and his Hip Pocket writing mate Peggy Sarlin. The song has been covered by over 60 performers around the globe, most notably Bette Midler. Burnett refers to "I Regret Everything" as "the world's most obscure hit".

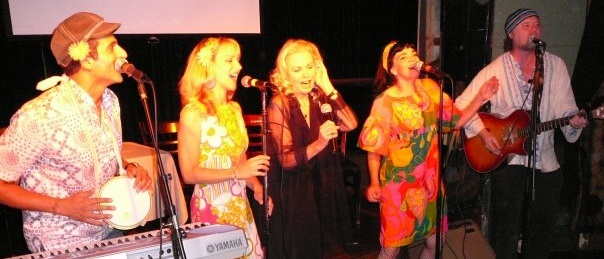
Michelle Phillips, formerly of The Mamas & the Papas, joined the Backboners for a song in 2008. Left to right: Kahlil Sabbagh, Ginger Smith, Phillips, Bill Burnett's first wife Suzy Williams, Burnett

Burnett's career as a singer/songwriter first took off when he and then-wife Suzy Williams formed a duo as The Boners in 1986 and performed regularly at Heather Woodbury's Cafe Bustelo in New York City. They also played with They Might Be Giants in Williamsburg, Brooklyn, New York City. Suzy and Burnett's witty melodic neo-cabaret folk-rock style culminated in “Our Show” held at the West Beth Theater. Their radio show for kids “The Flying Kitchen” aired in New York City. They toured with James Sewall and Sally Rousse in The New York Song and Dance Ensemble, performing at Lincoln Center. They have played the Sweet Chariot Music and Arts Festival in Swans Island, Maine every year since 1986. In 2004 Burnett and now-ex-wife Williams joined up with married couple Ginger Smith and Kahlil Sabbagh to expand The Boners into The Backboners, with four-part harmonies reminiscent of The Mamas & the Papas.

Burnett's career expanded when he met Fred Seibert and Alan Goodman at their irreverent advertising agency/marketing think tank, Fred/Alan, Inc. Starting as a freelance writer for the agency, he later became Creative Director, generating groundbreaking satirical campaigns for MTV, Nick-at-Nite, Nickelodeon. and Comedy Central. Burnett came up with the name Comedy Central and wrote its original branding document.

Burnett followed Fred Seibert to Hollywood to become VP Creative Director of Hanna-Barbera Cartoons, the venerable Hollywood studio. There he created campaigns in support of such breakthrough TV animation hits as Dexter's Lab, Powerpuff Girls and Courage the Cowardly Dog. He wrote the theme song and three special songs for Cave Kids, the series created for Flintstones kids Pebbles and Bamm-Bamm. He went on to become Head Writer/Story Editor for Cartoon Network's Cow and Chicken. He wrote stories and songs for the show, notably the musical two-part episode "The Ugliest Weenie", and has the dubious distinction of writing the only Cow and Chicken episode to be banned from regular network play, "Buffalo Gals".

Following Seibert to Nickelodeon, Burnett became a Creative Producer on the new anthology series Oh Yeah! Cartoons. He wrote the show's theme song and wrote and produced, over ten animated shorts. Most notably, he and veteran animator Larry Huber co-created ChalkZone in 2002, based on Burnett's idea about an alternative world behind the chalk board. The show's premiere received the highest ratings for a new show premiere in the network's history at the time, and continued for five years with high ratings and a passionate following. Other shows Burnett created or co-created for Oh Yeah included "Hobart" and "Jelly's Day" (with Greg Emison), "Tutu the Superina" (with prima ballerina Sally Rousse), "What Is Funny?" (with Vince Waller) and "The Feelers". Burnett wrote all of the stories and musical numbers and provided singing and acting voices on many episodes. During this time, he also wrote the script, music and lyrics for The Electric Piper, a feature-length animated reimagining of the classic Pied Piper tale commissioned by Nickelodeon.

In 2005, Burnett returned to Nickelodeon for the Oh Yeah! spinoff Random! Cartoons working with the Oh Yeah! team creating the short "Dr. Froyd's Funny Farm" with Jaime Diaz. He composed the scores for two other shorts: "Hornswiggle" (created by Jerry Beck) and the non-Random! Cartoons short "Gaucho Pampa" (also created by Diaz and produced by Huber).

Since leaving Nickelodeon, Burnett has written for the PBS/Universal production Curious George (for which he received an Emmy citation), Danger Rangers, Guardians of the Power Masks, Woody Woodpecker, Casper, and a web series featuring singing dolls.
