= Norman Zamcheck =

American singer-songwriter (born 1947)

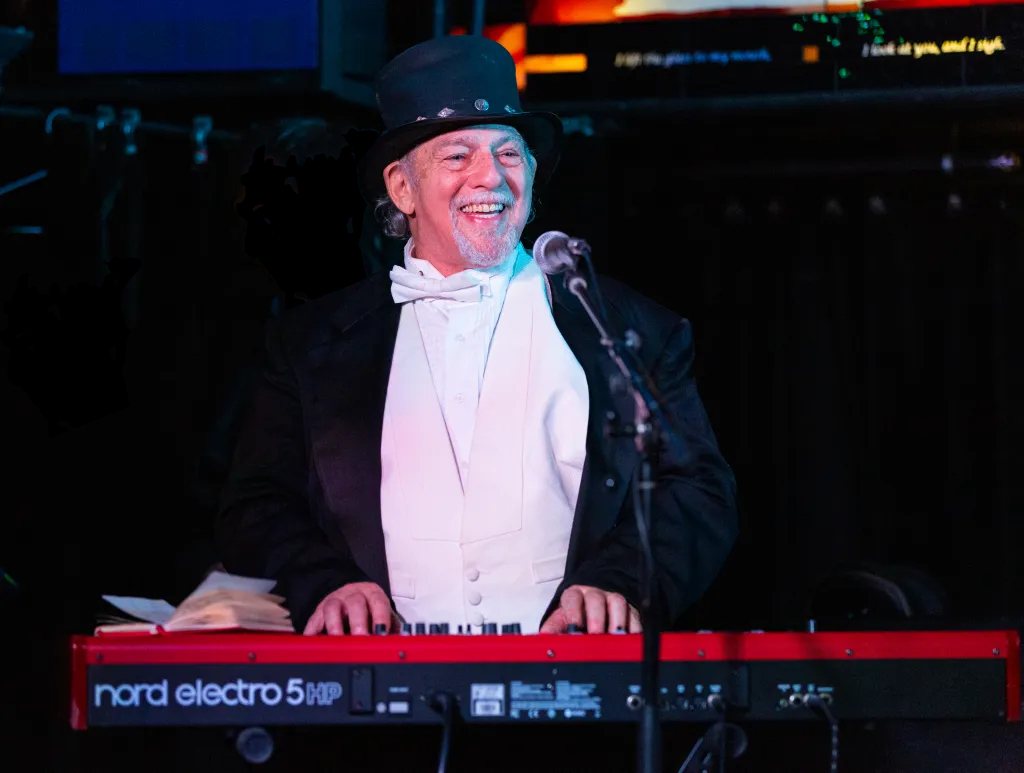
- Norman Zamcheck performing in 2022

Background information
- Born: Norman Zamcheck; February 23, 1947 (age 79); Washington, D.C., United States
- Genres: Blues, boogie-woogie, jazz, vaudeville, rock, folk cabaret, musical theater
- Occupations: Pianist, composer singer/songwriter
- Member of: Stormin' Norman and Suzy, The Real Stormin' Norman

"The Real Stormin" Norman Zamcheck (born February 23, 1947) is an American pianist and singer/songwriter, best known as bandleader of the New York-based Real Stormin' Norman Band, and the rock/vaudeville group Stormin' Norman and Suzy. Considered an innovator in the blues-ragtime revival, Zamcheck is known for his boogie-woogie blues, rag, and klezmer piano technique; his original long-form ballad songs; as well as for musicals and film soundtracks.

== Life and career ==
=== Early career ===
Zamcheck was born in Washington, D.C., but raised in Newton, a suburb of Boston, Massachusetts. Zamcheck is a member of the Boston-based Zamcheck musical family. Alongside his siblings Mark and Erica (of The Make., Mother Zamcheck's Bacon Band, and "Zamcheck"), Zamcheck was an influential member of the New England rock scene of the early 1970's.

Zamcheck's professional career began in 1969 as a songwriter and keyboardist for the rock collective Milkweed, composed of students from Yale University. Milkweed, an orchestral folk-rock group, played with major rock acts such as the Allman Brothers, Jimmy Buffett, and John Hammond Jr., during the 1970 and 1971 summer music festival seasons. Soon after leaving Milkweed in 1971, Zamcheck began a decades-long collaboration with singer Suzy Williams of Venice, California.

=== Stormin' Norman and Suzy ===
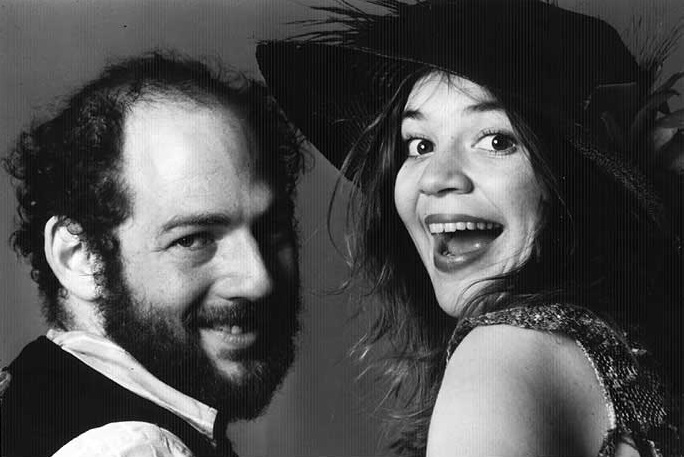
Norman Zamcheck and Suzy Williams in 1978

The duo Stormin' Norman and Suzy, formed when Zamcheck joined with Suzy Williams, released their first LP, Fantasy Rag, on Perfect Crime Records, in 1975, and toured throughout New England playing clubs, saloons, and hotels. Stormin' Norman and Suzy signed to Polydor Records in 1976, and released their second album, Ocean of Love. With a newly formed Stormin' Norman and Suzy Band including the musicians Mark Ribot, Mark Schulman, and Joe Dimone, they moved to New York to begin an open residency at Tramp's Cabaret, an event the New York Times called "The Hottest Act in Town". With positive reviews from major media publications, the Stormin' Norman and Suzy Band went on to play events at Carnegie Hall, network television showcases, and toured with acts including Bette Midler, Tom Waits, Loudon Wainwright III, Roosevelt Sykes, and The Manhattan Transfer. The band embarked on an international tour in 1979. In 1980, they began a 2-month-residency at the Hotel Palmas in The Canary Islands.

During the early 1980's, Stormin' Norman and Suzy developed musicals, cabaret programs, and various collaborations, including a tour with Moses Pendleton's Pilobolus Dance Company. In the late 1980's, Suzy and Norman pursued independent projects: Norman worked in New York and Williams moved to Los Angeles where she formed other bands.

In 2007, after a two-decade hiatus, the Stormin' Norman and Suzy Band reunited for a tour on the east coast and released their third album, Stormin' Norman and Suzy: Live at P & G Bar. They have toured again in 2008, 2012, 2014, 2018, and again in 2022.

=== Real Stormin' Norman ===
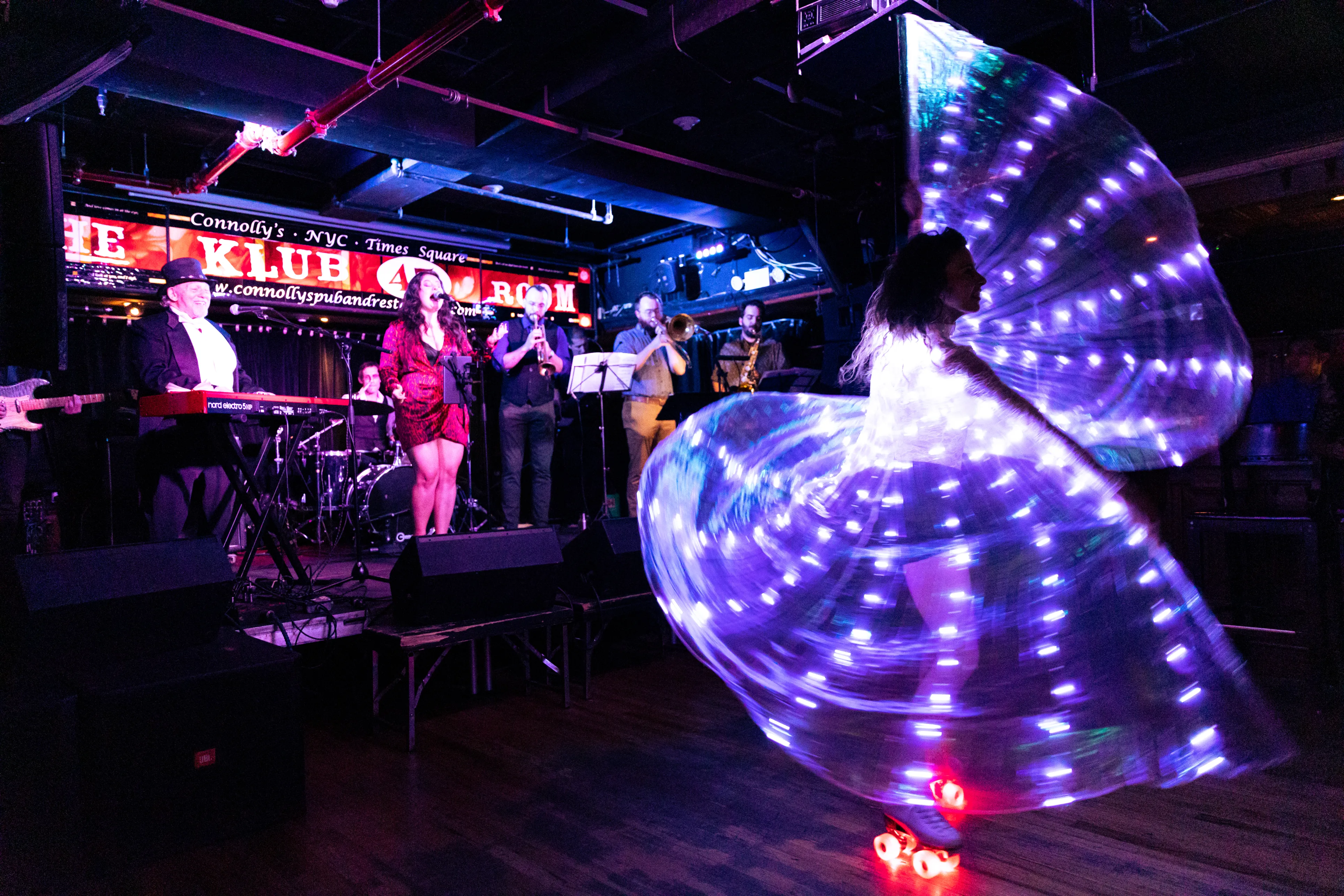
Real Stormin' Norman Band, Euphoria Record Release, January 2022

In response to the proliferation of "Stormin' Norman's", Zamcheck initiated the moniker The Real Stormin' Norman in 2006, with the release of his CD, Everyone Tells a Story (Abaraki). Zamcheck's new band began performing regularly in New York. They have released four albums on the Abaraki label; Matchbox Universe, Newton, 1969, The Oyster, and Euphoria in 2022.

The Real Stormin' Norman Band has been called "the longest running rock-big band gig in New York", with open-ended residencies at jazz and rock standards The Bitter End, The Shrine, and Silvana's Lounge. Long-term members include Genevieve Faivre, Arthur Sadowsky, Tad McCully, Tobias Ralph, Jon Saraga, Pete O'Connel, Ryoku Fukishiro, John "Gerry Putnam", Adrienne Asterita, "Even Stephen" Levee, Rodger Bartlett, and others.

=== Other works ===
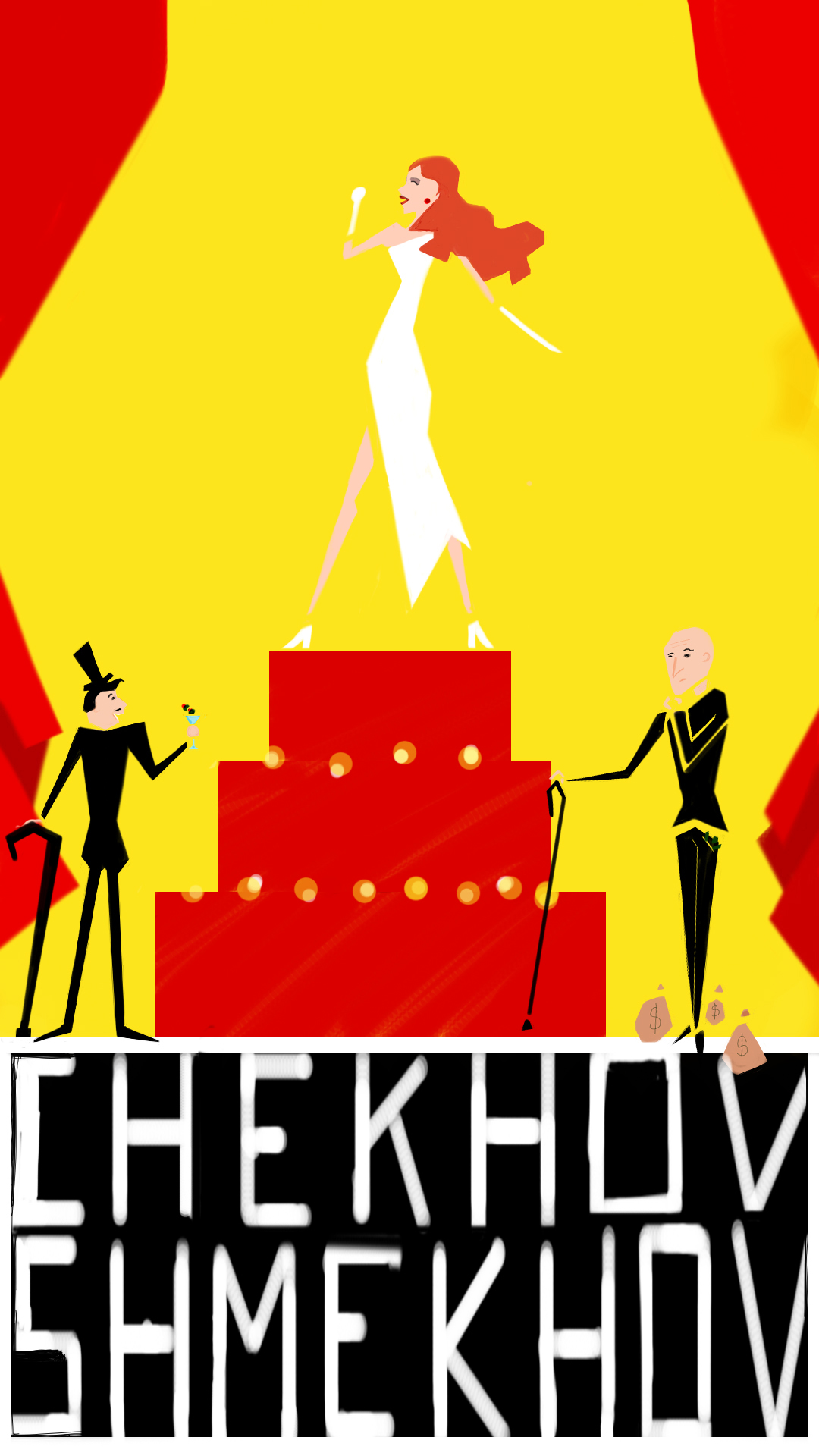
Checkov Shmekhov at New York Theatre Festival

In 1978, Zamcheck, together with Suzy Williams again, collaborated with director Nicholas Ray (Rebel Without a Cause) on the soundtrack for Ray's final film, We Can't Go Home Again. The duo appear throughout Ray's film, singing Zamcheck's song "Bless the Family". Thirty years later, Zamcheck contributed to the soundtrack for Don't Expect Too Much, a documentary about the making of We Can't Go Home Again. The original film, as well as the documentary, were released posthumously by Oscilloscope in 2012 at Lincoln Center, with a reunion performance by Stormin' Norman and Suzy.

Zamcheck has also written musicals, including Cinderella Street (performed with Williams at the Silver Linings Cabaret Theatre in 1979); and several collaboraitons with play-write Allan Yashin, including The Legend of Zippersky in 2016 and Checkhov Shmekov, which debuted at the New York Musical Festival in January, 2018.

Zamcheck was keyboardist for Andy Statman's Klezmer Orchestra in the early 1990s, during their tours of Europe and Israel.

=== Musical style ===
During the Stormin' Norman and Suzy years, critics focused on Zamcheck's ragtime, vaudeville, and old-timey style. The New York Times critic Robert Palmer deemed Zamcheck "a turpentine camp blues pianist, a turn-of-the-century-jazz and ragtime ivory tickler", while Rolling Stone critic Robert Christgau considered Zamcheck's songs to be "piquant 20's camp". Critics generally referred to SN&S's eclecticism, and disagreed as to whether the duo was a nostalgic comedy act -"A down-and dirty dance-hall duo that might've entertained cowpokes in the wild west" (Washington Post); or a serious musical project; "exceptionally original... modern without sounding strident..." (New York Times). SN&S were generally seen as a divergence from rock trends of the late 1970s, as described in a 1976 profile in The New York Times; "In New Jersey's recent rock revival, Bruce Springsteen is being touted as the biggest sensation since Sinatra; his cronies, Southside Johnny and the Asbury Dukes, have a large club following and Jersey‐born Patti Smith is being pushed as a national star. But here at Upsala College, a small, sleepy school where intimacy seems pleasant, not oppressive, many students seemed to prefer the folksy, slightly nostalgic approach of Stormin' Norman and Suzy (and their hack‐up band) to the piercing sound of hard rock".

Other critics focused on Suzy's star power, "Stormin' Norman and Suzy have returned to [Tramps], the room where they have acquired a following. Suzy is a funny, racy, slightly atavistic cross between a Texas Guinean and a contemporary folkie". (New York Magazine, 1977); "Norman writes the songs and the band mugs and clowns while performing them, but the focus is Suzy. With the voice and the generally cut floozy appearance of a fresh Janis Joplin, Suzy delivers an off-the-wall performance of jazzy-blues and barroom rag" (Billboard). At the height of Stormin Norman and Suzy's popularity, Norman's songwriting, stylistic eclecticism, and perceived anachronism was subject to withering criticism in the press, such as in the Rolling Stone review of Fantasy Rag; "Suzy Williams's natural echo calls up images of riverboats and cathouse pianos despite the thin recording. Unfortunately, Norman Zamcheck's voice calls up images of an account executive fulfilling his inner nature".

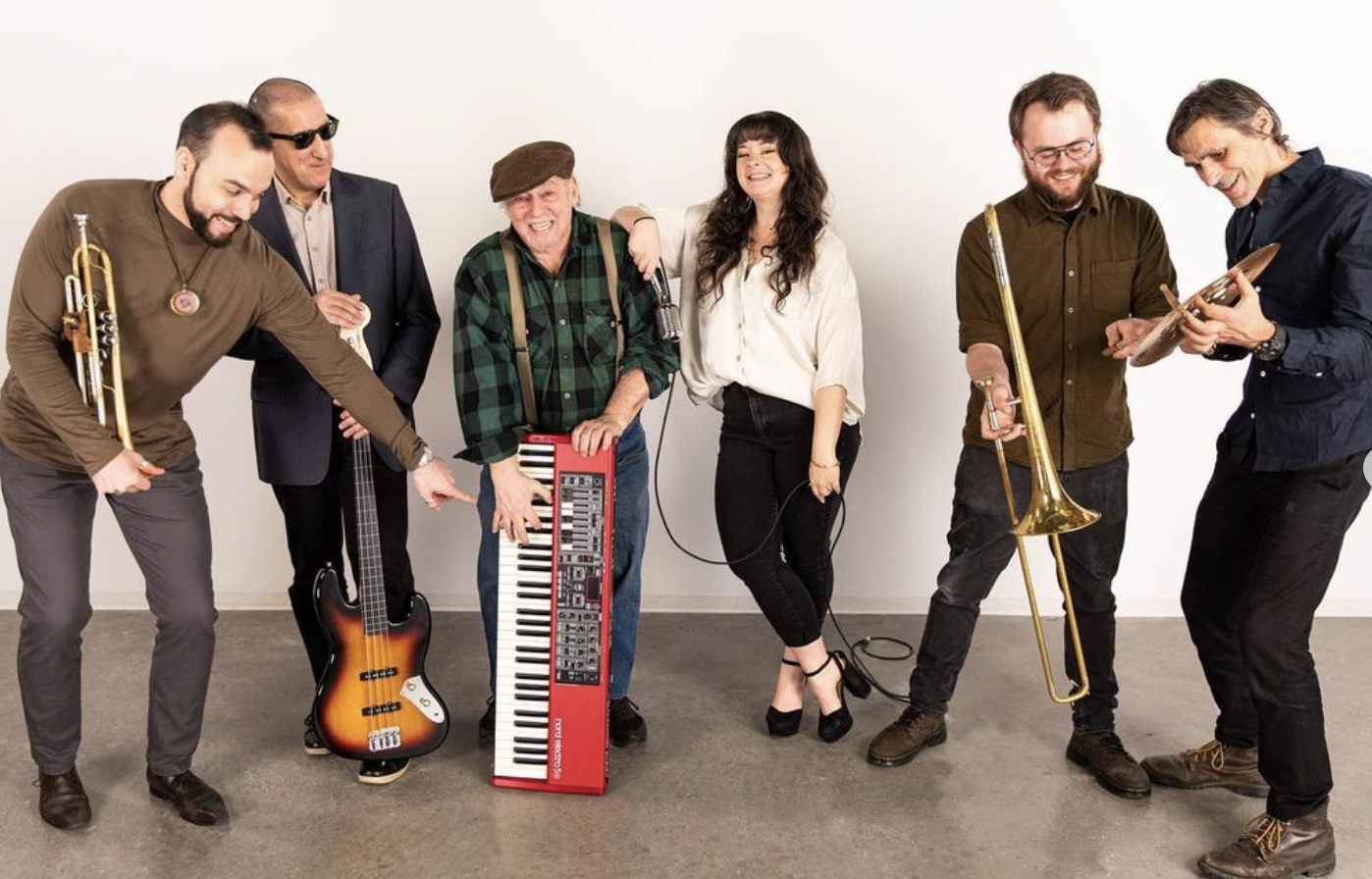
Photo of the Real Stormin Norman Band in 2022: left to right: John Saraga, Arthur Sadowsky, Zamcheck, Genevieve Faivre, Colin Babcock, Tobias Ralph

Zamcheck's work with Real Stormin' Norman Band has been received more favorably in the press. His 2022 album was described as "contemporary jazz with rock and Latin" and "Frank Zappa meets the sounds of New Orleans". In particular, the band is noted for long form big band song-arrangements: "narratives, or short stories, rather than the traditional verse and chorus, in which jazz and big band sounds guide listeners through a story".

== Discography ==
- Fantasy Rag (Perfect Crime, 1975)
- Ocean of Love (Polydor, 1976)
- Everyone Tells a Story (Abaraki 2008)
- Stormin' Norman and Suzy: Live at P & G Bar (Abaraki, 2009)
- Matchbox Universe (Abaraki, 2010)
- Newton, 1969 (Abaraki, 2016)
- The Oyster (Abaraki, 2018)
- Euphoria (Abaraki, 2022)

== Other appearances ==
- Andy Statman – Andy's Ramble (Rounder Records, 1994)
- The Andy Statman Klesmer Orchestra- Jewish Music Institute (WEA, 1986)

== Video clips ==
- Stormin Norman & Suzy - Boston 1979 on YouTube
- Nicholas Ray: WE CAN'T GO HOME AGAIN: Stormin' Norman and Suzy sing "Bless The Family"
- Stormin' Norman & Suzy-- Ocean of Love @ The Paradise Ballroom, Boston on YouTube
- "Scarab" - Real Stormin Norman Band NYE @ The Bitter End, 2016 on YouTube
- Stormin' Norman and Suzy, 1976
- REAL STORMIN NORMAN BAND LIVE IN STUDIO, September 2021
- Real Stormin' Norman Band at the Bitter End, 2019: "Fly Away"
