= Girl Power (disambiguation) =

Girl power is a term of female empowerment.

Girl Power may also refer to:

== Film and television ==
- Girl Power (film), a 1992 short film by Sadie Benning
- "Girl Power", a 1998 episode of the British television series Bugs
- "Girl Power", a 2003 episode of the reality television series Survivor: The Amazon
- "Girl Power", a 2005 episode of Drake & Josh

== Music ==
- Girl Power! Live in Istanbul, a 1997 concert by the Spice Girls
- Girl Power North America Tour, a 2014–2015 concert tour by English singer-songwriter Charli XCX
- "Girl Power" (song), a 2003 single by the Cheetah Girls

=== Albums ===
- One Hour of Girl Power, a 1997 video by the Spice Girls
- Girl Power (Shampoo album), a 1996 album, and its title track
- Girl Power (Twins album), a 2004 album
