= PXL =

PXL may refer to:

- PXL-2000, camcorder
- Paclitaxel, drug
- PCL 6 Enhanced, printer command language
