= Genghis Cohen =

Coordinates: 34.0794°N 118.3613°W

- Industry: Chinese-American food restaurant and music venue
- Founded: 1983
- Founder: Allan Rinde
- Headquarters: 448 N. Fairfax Ave., Los Angeles, California, U.S.
- Owner: Marc Rose and Med Abrous

Genghis Cohen is a New York-style Chinese-American food restaurant and music venue in Los Angeles, California located at 448 N. Fairfax Avenue. It opened in 1983. They specialize in New York style eggrolls, crab rangoon and queen chicken.

== History ==
After learning from chef Sophie Wong, music producer and New York native Allan Rinde crafted a Jewish-inspired Chinese cuisine to be utilized for the Genghis Cohen menu. He then opened Genghis Cohen in 1983 in the space of a former pizza enterprise while he was working at Cherokee Studios, located across the street. Rinde's friend, Artie Wayne, named the restaurant. In 1997, Rinde sold the business to long-time maître d’, Raymond Kiu. Kiu ran the restaurant until 2015, when he transferred ownership to restaurant regulars and New York natives Marc Rose and Med Abrous. The restaurant is known for inspiring the Seinfeld episode "The Chinese Restaurant."

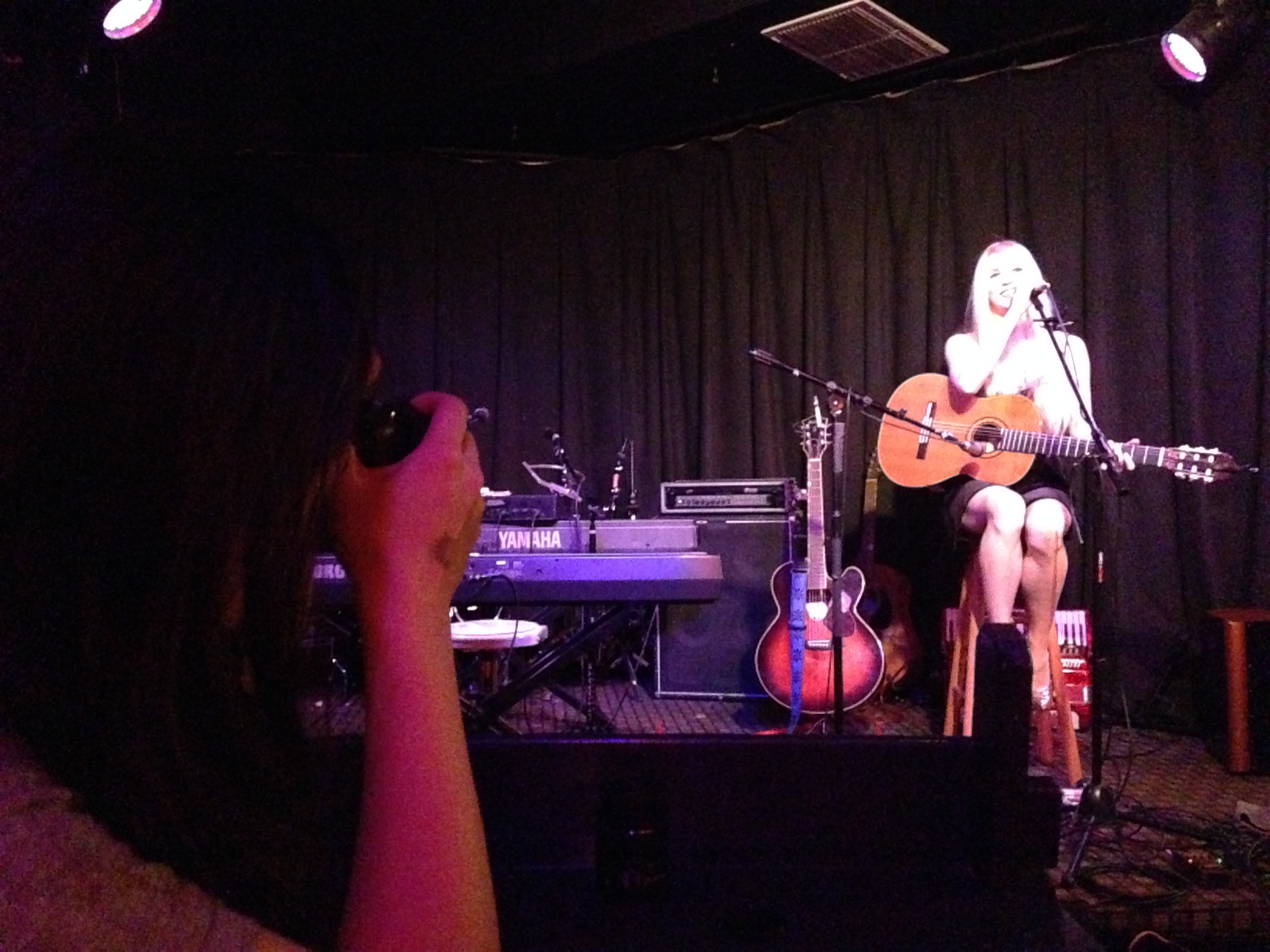
Musician Ricky Berger playing at Genghis Cohen in January 2015.

In 2025 it was announced that the restaurant would be departing from its location of 42 years due to the N. Fairfax Holdings LLC evicting the business; the restaurant ownership and the landlords had been "unable to secure a long-term lease solution at a reasonable rate." The restaurant temporarily relocated to 448 N. Fairfax Ave., a space a few blocks south of the original location. Plans for a new permanent location included an expanded bar and new late-night menu.

== Music ==
As a music producer, Allan Rinde opened the Genghis Cohen cantina adjacent to the restaurant to showcase music acts. By the late ‘80s, it became a busy spot for touring bands and local musicians. Sara Bareilles got her start at the cantina. The venue also played host to Jackson Browne, Beck, Dave Grohl, Bonnie Raitt, and Tom Morello. Suzy Williams and Nick Ariondo ran a ten-year residency at the venue.
