= We Can't Go Home Again =

- Directed by: Nicholas Ray
- Written by: Nicholas Ray; Tom Farrell; Susan Ray
- Starring: Richie Bock; Tom Farrell; Nicholas Ray; Danny Fisher; Jill Gannon; Jane Heymann; Leslie Levinson; Stanley Liu; Luke Oberle; Phil Weisman
- Cinematography: Richie Bock; Peer Bode; Danny Fisher; Mark Goldstein; Stanley Liu; Steve Maurer
- Edited by: Richie Bock; Charles Bornstein; Tom Farrell; Danny Fisher; Mark Goldstein; Nicholas James; Carol Lenoir
- Release date: 1973 (Cannes)
- Running time: 88 minutes (1973 cut); 95 minutes (1976 cut)
- Country: United States
- Language: English

We Can't Go Home Again is an experimental feature film directed by Nicholas Ray in collaboration with his film students at Binghamton University. Ray and the students play fictionalized versions of themselves.

The film was the major project of the last decade of Ray's life, and he and his collaborators continuously re-edited it. Rough versions of the film were screened at festivals as early as 1972 (including a Cannes premiere in 1973), and the most well-known cut was completed in 1976.

Ray was still making alterations to it at the time of his death in 1979.

== Production ==
In 1971, Nicholas Ray received an invitation to lecture at Binghamton University's Harpur College, which had at the time just established a film department. This led to Ray being offered a two-year teaching position at the department, which had been founded by Larry Gottheim and the experimental filmmaker Ken Jacobs. Ray became close with his students, and together with them moved into a house off-campus where the group formed a filmmaking commune. There they began work on We Can't Go Home Again, sharing all filmmaking duties.

The film soundtrack features the song “God Bless the Family” written by Norman Zamcheck and performed by him and Suzy Williams as the duo Stormin’ Norman & Suzy.

The film was made using a wide variety of equipment and shooting formats, including Super 8, 16mm, 35mm and a video synthesizer which had been donated to the project by Nam June Paik.

== Preservation ==
We Can't Go Home Again was preserved by the Academy Film Archive in 2011.
