= John Cate & The van Gogh Brothers =

American rock band

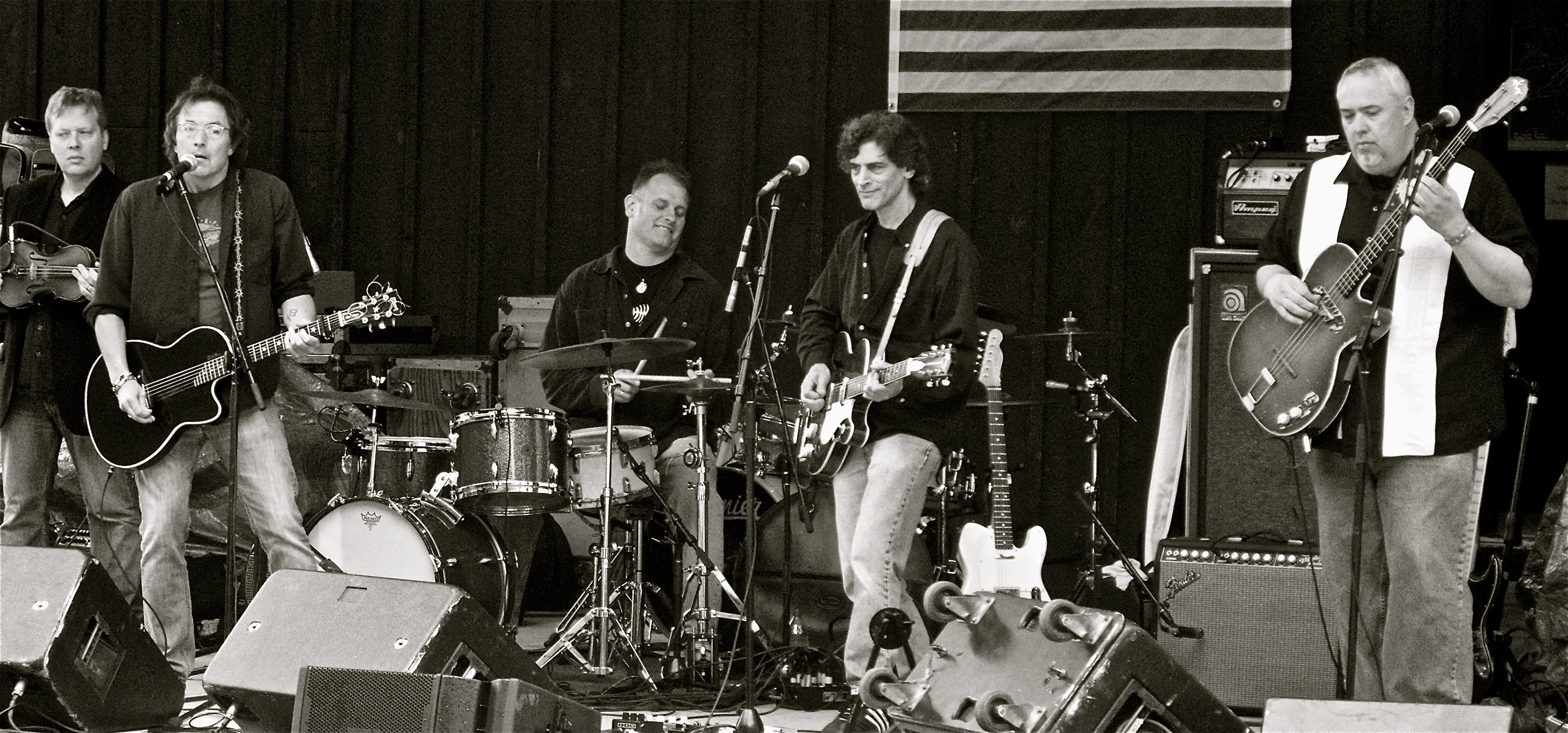
- John Cate & The van Gogh Brothers at Indian Ranch, Webster MA 2011

Background information
- Genres: Americana
- Years active: 1996–present
- Labels: American Music Partners; Rose Hip; Blue Rose
- Members: John Cate; Paul Candilore; Clayton Young; Steve Latt; Andy Plaisted; John Sands; Mike Levesque; Dave Mattacks
- Website: Official website

John Cate & The van Gogh Brothers and its offshoot, Voices of van Gogh, are an Americana band based in Boston, Massachusetts and Los Angeles, CA. They are also known for providing soundtrack music for television series and films including American Idol, NCIS, NUMB3RS, Touched by an Angel, Melrose Place and Dawson’s Creek, among others.

Band members include Cate, Paul Candilore who has recorded for Sony Music, Clayton Young, Steve Latt, and drummers Andy Plaisted formerly with the Swinging Steaks, John Sands (Aimee Mann, Kathleen Edwards), Mike Levesque (7 Mary 3), Tauras Biskis, and Dave Mattacks formerly with Fairport Convention, Paul McCartney, and George Harrison. Musicians who have also contributed significantly to albums include Jimmy Ryan (Blood Oranges), George Ricele (Bob Dylan), Jim Gambino (Swinging Steaks), Paul Kochanski (Swinging Steaks), and producer Anthony J. Resta (Elton John, Duran Duran, Collective Soul). The spin-off project, "Voices of van Gogh," includes Bob Dylan protege, violinist Scarlet Rivera; Rock and Roll Hall of Fame member, John Durrill, known for his legendary songwriting history; bassist Brian Jenkins; and drummer, Quinn, known for his work with Kanye, Disney, T-Bone Burnett and others. Cate writes extensively with other writers including British indie sensation, Callaghan. Cate's work with Durrill yielded a 2016 side project, "The Next Great American Song," for which they wrote and recorded 4 songs including the first in a series of songs about the life of Vincent van Gogh. In 2017 Cate began co-producing and writing a solo project for Scarlet Rivera.

John Cate & The van Gogh Brothers have, to date, released twelve albums, including "Painting With van Gogh" from the spin-off project, Voices of van Gogh, with the earliest, Set Free, released in 1996, and the most recent, '''Painting With van Gogh'', released in October, 2015. Eleven of the albums have been released under the American Music Partners label, of which Cate is the managing partner. Candiore and Cate have produced a large percentage of the albums, and they have also worked with producers Anthony J. Resta (Duran Duran, Collective Should, Elton John), Rob Fraboni (The Rolling Stones, Bob Dylan, The Band), and David Minehan of the Neighborhoods and the Replacements. A new van Gogh Brothers album was started in 2017 with vocal and acoustic guitar tracks recorded at Woodshed Studios in Malibu, CA, and band tracks at Woolly Mammoth studios in Waltham, MA.

== History ==
John Cate formed the van Gogh Brothers after returning to music in 1992 after a ~15 year musical hiatus. John played bass in the late 1960s and 1970s with the early jazz-rock "fusion" band Mother Zamcheck's Bacon Band which was succeeded by Zamcheck. Both bands were led by pianist Mark Zamcheck who was named Downbeat Magazine's up and coming Jazz pianist of 1974, and featured acclaimed composer and violinist, Michael Levine. Zamcheck performed at the Newport Jazz Festival in 1974 whereafter Herbie Mann described the group as "the future of jazz." Zamcheck also toured with Gary Burton and his band, which included a young Pat Metheny. Zamcheck was managed by impresario Steve Sesnick, who was known as manager of the Velvet Underground. Zamcheck disbanded in 1976. Cate then worked house sound and stage management at Paul's Mall/Jazz Workshop in Boston, with artists such as Little River Band, Pat Metheny, B.B. King, Muddy Waters, Robert Palmer and others. Cate earned a Bachelor's degree in accounting and worked in finance until his return to music in 1992. Cate resumed writing and performing as a singer-songwriter and was rejoined by Zamcheck in 1993. Zamcheck has supported Cate throughout his solo career as a musician and business partner. In 1995, Cate met Paul Candilore, who has served as Cate's musical foil and often as 1/2 of the production team. Cate & Candilore first formed the van Gogh Brothers as their production partnership, as a reference to each having "one good ear." Now the van Gogh Brothers encompass Cate's full band lineup. The band is published by Heavy Hitters Music & American Music Partners and their music is often heard on network television & in feature films. The vGBs perform in the Northeast and occasionally in the Midwest and Nashville & in LA as Voices of van Gogh.

== Discography ==
=== Studio albums ===
Year	Title	Label
1996	Set Free	American Music Partners
1998	American Night	American Music Partners
1998	Never Lookin' Back	American Music Partners / Rose Hip
2000	John Cate Band	Rose Hip
2001	V	Blue Rose
2002	Two Brothers	Blue Rose
2004	Livin' In The Moment	American Music Partners
2007	Wild Way	American Music Partners
2009	The Wonder Show	American Music Partners
2011	X	American Music Partners
2013	A Whole New Day	American Music Partners
2015	Painting With van Gogh	American Music Partners

== See also ==
- Music of Massachusetts
