= Sadie Benning =

American visual artist (born 1973)

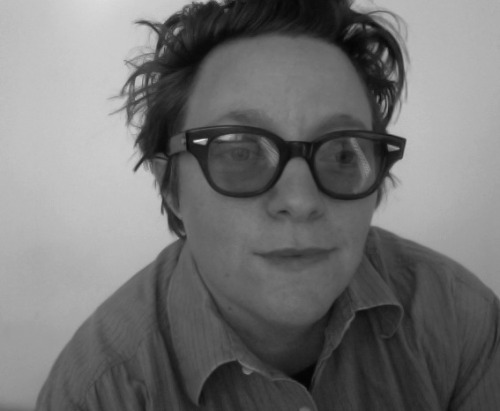
- Benning in 2011

Background information
- Born: April 11, 1973 (age 53); Madison, Wisconsin, U.S.
- Occupations: video maker, artist, musician, professor

Sadie T. Benning (born April 11, 1973) is an American artist, who has worked primarily in video, painting, drawing, sculpture, photography and sound. Benning creates experimental films and explores a variety of themes including surveillance, gender, ambiguity, transgression, play, intimacy, and identity. They became a known artist as a teenager, with their short films made with a PixelVision camera that have been described as "video diaries."

Benning was a co-founder and a former member of the American electronic rock band Le Tigre from 1998 until 2001.

== Early life ==
Sadie Benning was born April 11, 1973, in Madison, Wisconsin. Benning was raised by their mother in inner-city Milwaukee. Their parents divorced before they were born; their father is film director James Benning. Benning left high school at age 16 due to homophobia.

They have identified as non-binary.

== Work ==
=== Early work ===
Benning began creating visual works at age 15, they started filming with the "toy" video camera they received as a Christmas gift from their father, the experimental filmmaker James Benning. Benning used a Fisher-Price PXL-2000 camera, also known as PixelVision, which created pixelated black and white video on standard audio cassette tapes. At first, Benning was standoffish to the PixelVision camera and is quoted as saying, "I thought, 'This is a piece of shit. It's black-and-white. It's for kids. He'd told me I was getting this surprise. I was expecting a camcorder."

They made four short films and brought them to their father's film class he was teaching at Cal Arts, and they screened the films for the first time in front of a class. One of the students put one of the films in a film festival he was organizing. By the age of 19, they had shown their films at the Museum of Modern Art in New York City, the Sundance Institute, and at international film festivals.

=== Themes ===
The majority of Benning's shorts combined performance, experimental narrative, handwriting, and cut-up music to explore, among other subjects, gender and sexuality. Benning's work has been included in the Whitney Biennial twice (in 1993 and 2000), including as the youngest artist included in the well-known and controversial 1993 Whitney Biennial.

Benning's earlier videos – A New Year, Living Inside, Me and Rubyfruit, Jollies, and If Every Girl Had a Diary - used Benning's isolated surroundings and the effect this had on Benning as a focus for their theme. In Benning's earliest work, A New Year, Benning shied away from being in front of the camera, instead focusing on their surroundings – primarily the confines of their room and bedroom window – to portray their feelings of angst, confusion and alienation. "I don't talk, I'm not physically in it, it's all handwritten text, music; I wanted to substitute objects, things that were around me, to illustrate the events. I used objects in the closest proximity – the television, toys, my dog, whatever."

The themes of sexual identity and the challenges of growing up are repeated throughout the body of Benning's work, who self-identified as a lesbian in 2014. Benning's video Me and Rubyfruit is referred to as their "first video to be presented as a coming-out narrative". Benning uses pop culture, such as music, television or newspapers, to amplify their message while simultaneously parodying the same pop culture. Benning also draws inspiration from images on television or in movies, observing: "They're totally fake and constructed to entertain and oppress at the same time – they're meaningless to women, and not just to gay women. I got started partly because I needed different images and I never wanted to wait for someone to do it for me". The use of a variety of media in their work gives insight to the viewer on how Benning has been mostly interacting with the world.

As their work has progressed, Benning has increasingly used images of their own body and voice. In works such as If Every Girl Had a Diary, Benning uses the limitations of the PixelVision to get extreme closeups of their own face, eyes, fingers, and other extremities so that the focus is on sections of their face as they narrate their life and thoughts. In 1998, the English Professor Mia Carter observed: "Benning's daring autoerotic and autobiographic videos, [their] ability to make the camera seem a part of [their] self, and extension of [their] body, invite the audience to know [them]."

=== Later work ===
Benning received their M.F.A from Milton Avery Graduate School of the Arts at Bard College in 1997.

Their work is in various public museum collections including the Museum of Modern Art (MoMA), the Whitney Museum, the Smithsonian American Art Museum, and Albright-Knox Art Gallery, among others.

== Music ==
In 1998, Benning co-founded Le Tigre, the feminist post-punk band whose members include ex-Bikini Kill singer/guitarist Kathleen Hanna and zinester Johanna Fateman. Benning left the band in 2001 and JD Samson joined Le Tigre after Benning's departure.

== Exhibitions ==
| Year | Exhibition name | Location | Notes |
|---|---|---|---|
| 1990 | | Artists' Television Access, San Francisco, California | |
| 1991 | Film in the Cities | St. Paul, Minnesota | |
| 1991 | Fact/Fiction | Museum of Modern Art, New York | |
| 1991 | | Randolph Street Gallery, Chicago, Illinois | |
| 1992 | | Art and Kultureproject, Vienna, Austria | |
| 1992 | Videos on the Self | Finnish National Gallery, Helsinki, Finland | |
| 1992 | Cinema in the 90s | Vassar College, Poughkeepsie, New York | |
| 1993 | Whitney Biennial | Whitney Museum of American Art, New York City, New York | |
| 1993 | | British Film Institute, London, England | |
| 1993 | | Vera Vita Giola Gallery, Naples, Italy | |
| 1993 | | Galerie Crassi, Paris, France | |
| 1994 | In and Around the Body | Allegheny College, Meadville, Pennsylvania | |
| 1994 | Women's Self Portraits | University of California, Santa Cruz, and University of California, Berkeley | |
| 1994 | Queer Screen | Darlinghurst, New South Wales, Australia | |
| 1995 | World Wide Video Festival | Hague | |
| 1996 | Scream and Scream Again: Film in Art | Museum of Modern Art, Oxford, Oxford, England | |
| 1998 | Up Close and Personal | Philadelphia Museum of Art, Philadelphia, Pennsylvania | |
| 2007 | Sadie Benning: Suspended Animation | Wexner Center for the Arts, Columbus, Ohio | |
| 2007 | Sadie Benning: Play Pause | Dia Center, New York City, New York | |
| 2008 | 7th Gwangju Biennale | Gwangju, South Jeolla province, South Korea | |
| 2012 | VHS the Exhibition | Franklin Street Works, Stamford, Connecticut | |
| 2012 | Raw/Cooked: Ulrike Müller | Brooklyn Museum, Brooklyn, New York | |
| 2013–2014 | 2013 Carnegie International | Pittsburgh, Pennsylvania | |
| 2016 | Off-Site Exhibition: A Shape That Stands Up | Hammer Museum, Los Angeles, California | |
| 2017 | Shared Eye | Kunsthalle Basel, Basel, Switzerland | |

== Works ==
Film works by Benning
| Dates | Name | Medium | Duration | Notes |
|---|---|---|---|---|
| 1989 | A New Year | black & white video, Pixelvision | 5:57 | This piece is included in the art collection at the Smithsonian American Art Museum, the Museum of Modern Art. |
| 1989 | Me & Rubyfruit | black & white video, Pixelvision | 5:31 | This piece is included in the art collection at the Smithsonian American Art Museum, the Museum of Modern Art. |
| 1989 | Living Inside | black & white video, Pixelvision | 5:06 | This piece is included in the art collection at the Smithsonian American Art Museum, the Museum of Modern Art. |
| 1990 | If Every Girl Had a Diary | black & white video, Pixelvison | 8:56 | This piece is included in the art collection at the Smithsonian American Art Museum. |
| 1990 | Welcome to Normal | color video, Hi 8 | 20:00 | |
| 1990 | Jollies | black & white video, Pixelvision | 11:18 | This piece is included in the art collection at the Smithsonian American Art Museum, the Museum of Modern Art. |
| 1991 | A Place Called Lovely | black & white video, Pixelvision | 13:40 | |
| 1992 | It Wasn’t Love (But It Was Something) | black & white video, Pixelvision | 19:06 | |
| 1992 | Girl Power | black & white video, Pixelvision | 15:00 | |
| 1995 | The Judy Spots | color video, 16 mm film | 12:30 | The film is produced by Elisabeth Subrin. This piece is in the art collection at the Museum of Modern Art. |
| 1995 | German Song | black & white video, Super 8 film | 6:00 | Made in collaboration with Come. This piece is in the art collection at the Museum of Modern Art. |
| 1998 | Flat Is Beautiful | black & white video, Pixelvision, 16mm film, and Super 8 film | 56:00 | Video is co-starring Mark Ewert. This piece is in the art collection at the Museum of Modern Art. |
| 1998 | Aerobicide | video, color | 4:00 | Video recorded for the track of the same name, on the Julie Ruin album. |
| 2006 | Play Pause | two channel video installation from hard drive, color digital video/ drawings on paper | 29:21 | Directed by Sadie Benning in collaboration with Solveig Nelson, drawings and sound by Sadie Benning. Influenced by the book, Ulysses by James Joyce. This piece is included in the art collection at the Whitney Museum of American Art. |

Installation and fine art work by Benning
| Year | Name | Medium | Notes |
|---|---|---|---|
| 1999 | Le Tigre Slide Show | slide installation projected during Le Tigre music performances, 40:00, drawings & color slides | |
| 2003 | The Baby | installation, 5:40, color digital video/ drawings on paper | |
| 2003 | One Liner | installation, 5:07, b&w video/ Pixelvision | |
| 2013 | Locating Center | installation of abstract paintings | This work was commissioned by the Carnegie Museum of Art, for the 2013 Carnegie International. |

Music work by Benning
| Year | Name | Type | Notes |
|---|---|---|---|
| 1999 | Le Tigre | compact disc and vinyl | Music album recorded with Kathleen Hanna and Johanna Fateman. |

== Awards, recognition, and honors ==
In 1991, the first article about Benning's work, written by Ellen Spiro, appeared in the national gay magazine The Advocate. In 2004, Bill Horrigan curated a retrospective of Benning's works on video. In 2009, Chloe Hope Johnson contributed a chapter in the book There She Goes: Feminist Filmmaking and Beyond (Contemporary Approaches to Film and Media Series) entitled Becoming-Grrrl The Voice and Videos of Sadie Benning.

Benning has received grants and fellowships from Guggenheim Fellowship (2005) by the John Simon Guggenheim Memorial Foundation, Rockefeller Foundation grant (1992), Andrea Frank Foundation, and National Endowment of the Arts (NEA). Awards include the Wexner Center Residency Award in Media Arts (2003–2004, which was extended to 2006), National Alliance for Media Arts and Culture Merit Award, Grande video Kunst Award, and the Los Angeles Film Critics Circle Award.

Their videos are distributed by Video Data Bank at the School of the Art Institute of Chicago.

== Publications ==
- Benning, Sadie; Lange, Jennifer (2007). Sadie Benning: Suspended Animation (exhibition book). Columbus, Ohio: Wexner Center for the Arts, Ohio State University. ISBN 9781881390411.
