= Gerry Fialka =

American filmmaker

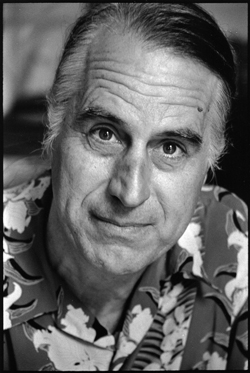
- Born: Gerald Joseph Fialka; March 15, 1953 (age 72); Flint, Michigan, U.S.
- Education: University of Michigan; Flint Institute of Arts
- Occupation(s): experimental filmmaker, film and art festival curator, lecturer, interviewer, writer
- Known for: Experimental film Pixelvision Film Festival; Marshall McLuhan media theory Frank Zappa archivist
- Spouse: Suzy Williams
- Website: Laughtears.com

Gerry Fialka (born March 15, 1953) is an American experimental filmmaker, curator, lecturer, interviewer, and writer. He lectures and leads workshops on experimental film, avant-garde music and art, subversive social media, books by James Joyce, and Marshall McLuhan’s media theory. He was Frank Zappa’s archivist and production assistant for ten years, and also worked for George Carlin. LA Weekly has described Fialka as a “cultural revolutionary”.

== Association with Frank Zappa ==
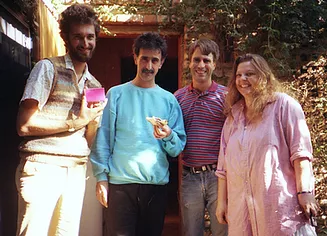
Simon Prentis (Zappa's "Semantic Scrutinizer"), Zappa, Fialka, and Zappa's wife Gail outside Zappa's home Utility Muffin Research Kitchen recording studio in 1986. Prentis holds a preview cassette of the album Jazz From Hell that Fialka had just delivered for Zappa's approval.

Fialka worked for musician-composer Frank Zappa as archivist, production assistant, tour assistant, and factotum from 1983 to 1993. He answered the phone for Zappa’s Barking Pumpkin Records hotline, and ran Zappa’s mail-order merchandise business Barfko-Swill. Fialka appears giving a tour of Barfko-Swill in the 1987 VHS release (but not the original 1979 film release) of Zappa's film Baby Snakes. While not listed in the film credits, he is credited on-screen as "GERALD FIALKA Cool Guy Who Wraps Stuff So It Doesn't Break". A short clip of this appearance is also included in the 2020 documentary film Zappa.

Fialka has published articles on Zappa, and was a co-interviewer in 1988 when Zappa expressed his thoughts on media theory. In a 1990 interview, Zappa mentioned that Fialka gave him a present that impressed him more than any other present from his staff: a videotape of The World's Greatest Sinner. Zappa band member Ike Willis called Fialka "one of the most brilliant people I have ever known and ever met ... an astoundingly astute and brilliant person ... the kind of guy that Frank [Zappa] loved to have in his orbit."

== Associations with other musicians ==
Fialka was Executive Producer for the first song, "Revenge of the Nurds", ever released by Dawayne Bailey, who went on to play guitar for rock music bands including Chicago and Bob Seger & the Silver Bullet Band. Fialka also acted as Bailey’s first manager. He has also produced recordings by local Venice, California musicians, including Sunny War.

Guitarist John Frusiante of the Red Hot Chili Peppers has talked about Fialka's influence on him when he was interviewed by music executive and producer Rick Rubin.

== Experimental film ==
Fialka has written, directed, produced, and/or acted in several short experimental films. Collaborators have included Mark X. Farina, Will Erokan, Clifford Novey, Bruno Kohfield-Galeano, Tyler Bartram, Tim Corvin, and Mike Sakamoto (who is making a film about Fialka); and some films feature Fialka’s wife Suzy Williams, or Morgan Ågren, who played drums for various Frank Zappa projects and concerts.

Fialka produced and directed a feature-length experimental documentary film The Brother Side of the Wake, released in 2021, about the people of Venice in Los Angeles, California. It is billed as a remake of Orson Welles's satire The Other Side of the Wind, since both films probe the same question: "Is the journey more important than the destination?" Fialka's film mixes in elements of "psychic effects of direct cinema, abstract animation, films about films", communal call-and-response ritual, and James Joyce’s book Finnegans Wake.

Fialka ran the Ann Arbor Film Co-op from 1972 to 1980. He has been a panelist, served on the screening committee (1977-1980), and run many workshops at the Ann Arbor Film Festival. Fialka founded, curates, and hosts the annual Venice Film Fest. He was also director of the Ann Arbor 8mm Film Festival.

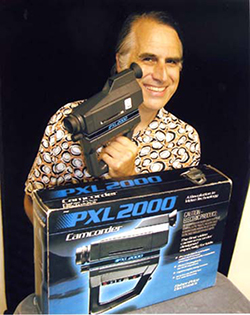
Fialka with the toy videocamera used to make all films in the PXL THIS Film Festival that he founded and curates.

Fialka is the founder, organizer, and curator of the PXL THIS Film Festival, usually held at the Beyond Baroque Literary Arts Center and the Echo Park Film Center, both in Los Angeles, California. The festival features films made using a PXL-2000 toy video camera formerly sold by Fisher-Price. Although the festival operates without a budget, it still manages to tour many locations including the San Francisco Cinematheque and Boston's MIT campus. Festival entries, oral history interviews, and other relevant materials donated by Fialka are being processed into the Performing Arts and Moving Image Archives at the University of California, Santa Barbara Library.

== Interviews ==
Fialka has conducted and published over 365 interviews. His interview of funk musician George Clinton was published in Flipside fanzine. He has also interviewed singer-songwriter Dr. John; music performer-composer-arranger-producer Van Dyke Parks; turntablist-music producer-philosopher-writer DJ Spooky; singer and activist Jello Biafra; Zappa-band guitarists Steve Vai, Warren Cuccurullo, and Mike Keneally, and keyboardist Don Preston; folk musician Baby Gramps; musical satirist Roy Zimmerman; rock and roll groupie-writer-musician-actress Pamela Des Barres; writer Janet Fitch; artists Alexis Smith and Mike Kelley; artist-dancer-choreographer-writer Simone Forti; actress-writer-artist Mary Woronov; actress-singer Ann Magnuson; Firesign Theatre comedian Phil Proctor; comedians Paul Krassner and Rick Overton; filmmakers Nile Southern, Mike Hoolboom, and Haskell Wexler; physicist and media ecologist Robert K. Logan, communications theorist and media ecologist Eric McLuhan (son of Marshall McLuhan); media theorist and writer Douglas Rushkoff; media arts and political theorist Gene Youngblood; Film Threat publication founder Chris Gore; political activist Tom Hayden; and more.

Fialka has published a full book, Strange Questions: Experimental Film as Conversation, of his interviews with notables in avant-garde cinema who offer insights into "its creative processes, formative influences, and hidden psychic effects." Some of his other interviews have been cited or republished by others.

== Other published works ==
Fialka has published essays in various experimental film magazines including cineSource Magazine, Otherzine, and Canyon Cinemazine, and regularly publishes essays on local news in the Free Venice Beachhead. He sometimes writes using a pen name that is an obvious take-off on his real name, such as Geritol Fialkaseltzer or Germy Folkywaze.

Fialka has written a chapter " ‘Don’t Even Look At It' ─ Pixelvision & Multi-Screens" in the book Undependently Yours: Imagining A World Beyond The Red Carpet, and contributed an essay to the book Craig Baldwin: Avant to Live!

== Personal life ==
Fialka married singer-songwriter Suzy Williams in 2001. They currently live in Venice, Los Angeles, California, where Fialka founded, organizes, and leads reading clubs on Marshall McLuhan’s books and percepts on media theory and on "his own distinctive approach" to James Joyce’s novel Finnegans Wake, annual Venice film and photography festivals, and a variety of other community events including film screenings, discussion groups, and art shows. He also displays his own artwork, primarily collages, in local art shows, and produces local live musical shows. He performs in local music bands, including as a contributor to the Waywords and Meansigns international project setting Finnegans Wake to music.

Fialka and Williams were the featured couple in the July 2020 edition of Venice Living magazine. An entire subchapter "Pixilated Populism" of the book Venice, CA: A City State of Mind (which includes a photograph of Fialka on its cover), is devoted to Fialka, and summarizes Fialka's significance to Venice by stating "Gerry's a master at introducing people and steering the wayward onesomes to action ... to spreading awareness ... His encyclopedic grasp of Venetian and media history swells the archive that circulates in the heads of citizens."
