= Dan Weinstein (musician) =

American jazz musician

Dan Weinstein (born in Los Angeles, United States) is a multi-instrumentalist, composer and arranger in the southern California music scene. Weinstein has recorded in multiple genres during the past five decades but primarily known for live jazz performances. Although he is mainly known for his work on trombone and violin, Weinstein also performs on trumpet, viola and tuba. His most widely known credits come from his live work with the Jacksons (1976–77) and Ray Charles' Big Band (1984). Weinstein has toured with Larry Harlow, Mandrill, Bobby Caldwell, the Lucky Stars, and Janet Klein, among others. He also performs with his salsa and Latin jazz band, Viva.

Outside of live jazz, much of Weinstein's other credited works are related to film and television. His movie soundtrack credits include The Nightmare Before Christmas, The Whole Nine Yards, Drumline, Horton Hears a Who, Robots and Hancock. Weinstein's television credits include Hart to Hart, Third Rock From the Sun, The Jamie Foxx Show and Self Made.

Weinstein is musical arranger and performer in various bands and ensembles, including Suzy Williams and Her Solid Senders. He co-composed, arranged and orchestrated two major works for the Symphonic Jazz Orchestra. Weinstein has also written journalistic pieces about music in periodicals and liner notes.
