= Mews Small =

American actress and singer (born 1942)

- Born: Mary Edith Willard Small
- Other names: Marya Small, Merrya Small, Mary Small Rusk, Mary Small
- Occupations: Actress, singer
- Years active: 1966–present
- Website: mewssmall.com

Mews Small (born Mary Edith Wilard Small) is an American actress and singer. She was known professionally as Marya Small during the 1970s and has also been credited as Merrya Small, Mary Small Rusk, and Mary Small.

== Acting career ==
Small got her acting start in a 1966 theatre production of The Sound of Music in Stowe, Vermont. She has since acted in numerous feature films and television shows.

Small originated the role of Frenchy in the original Broadway production of the musical Grease, with a cast including Barry Bostwick and Adrienne Barbeau. She was later joined by cast members John Travolta, Patrick Swayze, Treat Williams, and Marilu Henner.

Small is best known for her roles as Candy in the film One Flew Over the Cuckoo's Nest (credited as Marya Small) and Dr. Nero in Woody Allen's film Sleeper. She also portrayed the Janis Joplin-inspired role of Frankie in the animated rotoscope film American Pop. Small appeared in the first episode of Kolchak: The Night Stalker in 1975.

Mews is the lead singer of her band Mews Small and The Small Band, who has released a CD Do What You Do in 2008. She also sings regularly with Suzy Williams, and the two have written songs together.

== Politics ==
Mews Small ran as the Natural Law Party nominee for the United States House of Representatives for California's 25th congressional district in 2000. She received 1.35% or 3,010 votes.

== Filmography ==
- The Trouble with Angels (1966) – Nun (uncredited)
- Sleeper (1973) – Dr. Nero
- Maude – The Commuter Station (1974) – The Girlfriend
- The Wild Party (1975) – Bertha
- One Flew Over the Cuckoo's Nest (1975) – Candy
- Barney Miller - Chase (1977) - Sheila Rosen
- The Last of the Cowboys (1977) – Alice
- The Great Smokey Roadblock (1977) – Slave Girl No. 2
- Thank God It's Friday (1978) – Jackie
- The Dukes of Hazzard (1979) – Frankie
- Dreamer (1979) – Elaine
- Fade to Black (1980) – Doreen (uncredited)
- American Pop (1981) – Frankie
- Zapped! (1982) – Mrs. Springboro
- National Lampoon's Class Reunion (1982) – Iris Augen
- Young Lust (1987) – Connie
- Five Corners (1987) – Woman in Deli
- Puppet Master (1989) – Theresa
- Man on the Moon (1999) – TM Administrator
- A Wake in Providence (1999) – Casting Director (voice)
- Raw Footage (2005) – Wedding Guest
- The Gift: At Risk (2007) – Mother Superior
- Boppin' at the Glue Factory (2009) – Mary LeDoux
