= Chords of Fame (film) =

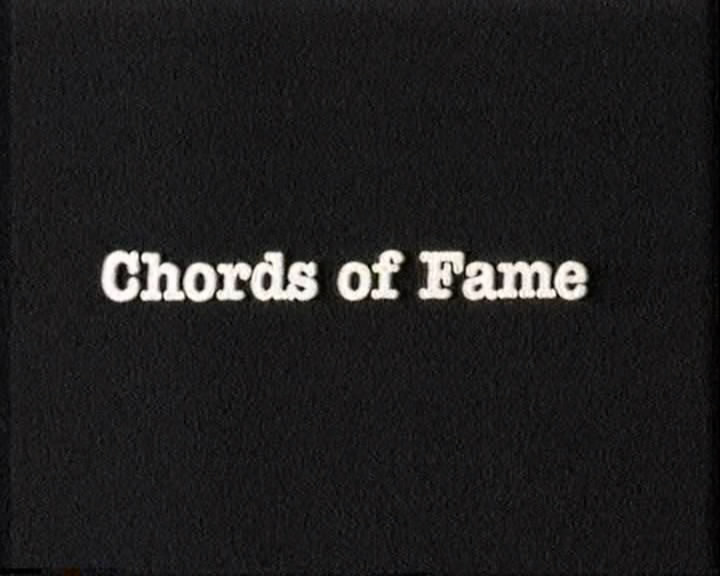
- Title card
- Directed by: Michael Korolenko
- Written by: Mady Schutzman
- Produced by: Michael Korolenko, Mady Schutzman, and David Sternburg
- Starring: Odetta, Martha Wingate, Bill Burnett, Abbie Hoffman, Mike Porco, Oscar Brand, Tom Paxton
- Release date: 1984
- Running time: 88 minutes
- Country: United States
- Language: English

Chords of Fame is a 1984 feature-length documentary film about Phil Ochs, an American singer-songwriter of the 1960s and early 1970s. The film was directed by Michael Korolenko, written by Mady Schutzman, and produced by Korolenko, Schutzman, and David Sternburg. It was funded in part by grants from the American Film Institute and the National Endowment for the Arts.

== Synopsis ==
Chords of Fame features ChalkZone co-creator Bill Burnett as Ochs in re-enactments of scenes from his life, and Martha Wingate (AKA Martha Taylor) as his wife, Alice Ochs.

The film includes interviews with people who had known Ochs, including Yippies Abbie Hoffman and Jerry Rubin, manager Harold Leventhal, and Mike Porco, the owner of Gerde's Folk City.

Chords of Fame also includes performances of Ochs songs by folk musicians who knew him, such as Bob Gibson, Pete Seeger, Tom Paxton, Dave Van Ronk, and Eric Andersen.

The film concludes with footage of Ochs performing "I Ain't Marching Anymore" at The Troubadour in Los Angeles.

As of 2017, Chords of Fame has not been released on DVD.

== Reception ==
Reviewing the film in The New York Times, Janet Maslin wrote that by re-enacting scenes from Ochs's life, Korolenko took "an exasperating approach" in making Chords of Fame. She would have preferred photos and recordings of Ochs himself. "The singer's own voice is almost entirely absent from this biography," she wrote, "and this omission makes Chords of Fame seem, at the very best, incomplete."

Eleanor Mannikka, writing at Allmovie, agreed:"This biographical documentary would have benefitted [sic] from more of the singer's own performances, allowing viewers to better judge his talent."
