= Stormin' Norman =

Stormin' Norman is a rhyming nickname frequently used for anyone named Norman who is also seen as a dynamic or forceful personality. The name is usually a media tag. Here are a few examples of public figures with that tag:

- Norm Sloan (1926–2003), American college basketball coach
- Norman Tebbit (1931–2025), British Conservative politician
- Norm Ellenberger (1932-2015), American college basketball coach
- Norm Cash (1934–1986), major league baseball player
- Norman Schwarzkopf, Jr. (1934–2012), American military figure
- Norm Stewart (born 1935), American college basketball coach (University of Missouri)
- Norman Siegel (born 1943), American civil rights attorney
- Norman Christ (born 1943), American physicist
- Norman Moore (born 1945), State President Liberal Party of Australia (WA Division)
- Norman Zamcheck (born 1947), American pianist and singer/songwriter
- Norm Van Lier (1947–2009), American basketball player
- Norm Nixon (born 1955), American retired professional basketball player for the NBA
- Norman Whiteside (born 1965), Northern Irish footballer
- Norman Ligairi (born 1976), a Fijian rugby union player
- Norman Parke (born 1986) Northern Ireland born MMA fighter known as "Stormin' Norman Parke."
- Norman Powell (born 1993) American professional basketball player
