= Deon Nielsen Price =

American pianist, composer and educator (born 1934)

- Born: May 16, 1934 (age 92); Salt Lake City, Utah, United States
- Education: Brigham Young University; University of Michigan; University of Southern California
- Employer(s): California State University, Northridge; University of California, Santa Barbara; Long Beach City College; El Camino College
- Organization(s): International Alliance for Women in Music; American Society of Composers, Authors and Publishers; Mu Phi Epsilon
- Notable work: Accompanying Skills for Pianists (1991)
- Spouse: Kendall O. Price
- Children: 5

Deon Nielsen Price (born May 16, 1934) is an American collaborative pianist, classical composer, educator and writer. Her book Accompanying Skills for Pianists (1991) is noted for outlining the foundational concepts for pianists new to collaborative piano.

== Biography ==
Price was born on May 16, 1934, in Salt Lake City, Utah, United States. She began signing as a child and performed as a vocal soloist from kindergarten. She was awarded the San Francisco Bay Area Bank of America Achievement Award in Fine Arts when she graduated from high school.

Price studied a Bachelor of Arts at Brigham Young University (BYU) in Provo, Utah; a Master of Music at the University of Michigan (UMich) in Ann Arbor, Michigan; and a Doctorate of Musical Arts at the University of Southern California (USC) in Los Angeles, California. She studied piano with Gwendolyn Koldofsky and composition with Leslie Bassett and Samuel Adler.

As a solo and collaborative pianist, Price has performed in the continental United States, South America, Asia and Europe. In the 1980s, she performed in the Echosphere Duo with saxophonist Paul Stewart. In the 1990s, she performed in the Echosphere Quartet with violinist Ayke Agus, tenor Darryl Taylor and saxophonist Douglas Masek.

As an educator, Price taught music theory, history and composition at California State University, Northridge in Los Angeles; University of California, Santa Barbara; her alma mater USC; El Camino College in Torrance, California; and Long Beach City College in Long Beach, California.

Price wrote the book Accompanying Skills for Pianists (1991), which outlined foundational concepts for pianists new to collaborative piano and designated the common accompaniment types as chordal, rhythmic, characteristic and orchestral-type. It became a required text in many American musical faculties.

Price served on the board of directors and as president of the International Alliance for Women in Music (IAWM), was an officer of the Mu Phi Epsilon International Music Fraternity (MPE), and is a member of the American Society of Composers, Authors and Publishers (ASCAP).

In 2021, Price composed Gallery for baritone and piano with accompanying words written by Dublin, California's Poet Laureate James Morehead. The piece premiered at the historic Presidio Chapel for the Interfaith Center at the Presidio of San Francisco, California, where she has been composer in residence since 2017.

== Select compositions ==
- Augury (1980, Alto Saxophone, Violin, and Piano)
- Gallery (2021, Baritone and Piano)
- Behind Barbed Wire (Saxophone and Piano or Saxophone and Orchestra)
- Dancing on the Brink of the World

== Personal life ==
Price is the mother of five children. Her son Berkeley became a clarinetist and they perform on tour together as the Price Duo.
