= Ayke Agus =

Indonesian violinist and pianist (born 1949)

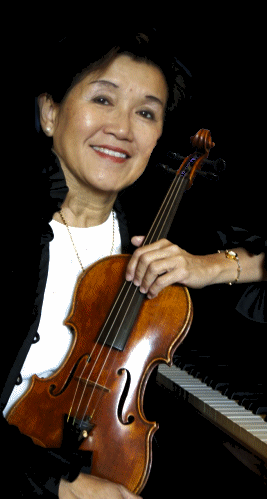
- Agus with her two instruments

Background information
- Born: December 30, 1949 (age 76); Yogyakarta, Indonesia
- Origin: Chinese, Dutch, Javanese
- Genre: classical
- Occupations: Recording artist, Performance artist, author, lecturer, instructor
- Instruments: violin, piano
- Years active: 1969-present
- Website: aykeagus.com

Ayke Agus (born 1949) is an Indonesian classical violinist and pianist, known primarily through her longtime collaboration with the violinist Jascha Heifetz. She is one of the rare classical music performers who has performed as a soloist accompanied by an orchestra as a Multi-instrumentalist.

== Early life ==
A native of Indonesia, of Chinese, Dutch and Javanese ancestry, Agus was recognized as a child prodigy at the age of 7 on violin and piano. By the age of 11, she had learned everything Mr. Tan, her teacher in Yogyakarta, Indonesia, had to teach her. He recommended that she continue her studies with Mr. Adidharma in Jakarta, 450 miles away. The solution to the inherent logistics problem was for her to study with Mr. Adidharma in the summer, giving her the opportunity to study the piano during the rest of the year.

Agus was offered many scholarships, starting at the age of 7, but was unable to pursue them initially because her parents thought her too young to live on her own, and later because she was unable to obtain an exit visa. A missionary, Sister Brigid Conboy, who was following Agus's career was able to arrange for a scholarship at Rosary Hill College near Buffalo, New York, United States. After her first paid concert in May 1969, Governor Ali Sadikin granted her the exit visa.

After achieving success in local competitions, she became the youngest member of the Buffalo Philharmonic Orchestra. This was followed by two full scholarship offers: Juilliard School of Music, recommended by violin pedagogue Ivan Galamian and the University of Southern California. With her acceptance into the Jascha Heifetz Master Class at USC began a lasting association with him that lasted until his death in 1987.

== Education ==
- Studied on scholarship at Rosary Hill College (now Daemen University), Amherst, New York, 1969-1971
- Jascha Heifetz Master Class (at USC), 1971 - 1973
- Bachelor of Music, Performance, USC, 1974
- Master of Music, Performance, USC, 1976
- Honorary Doctorate Degree of Humane Letters, Daemen College, Buffalo, NY, 2007

== Career as a musician ==
As a teacher of master classes, private lessons, and as a public lecturer and performer, Agus has spent 30 years focused on continuing the Heifetz legacy, regarding his musical beliefs, principles, musical ethics, teaching of the Art of Musical Collaboration, and teaching of the Art of Writing Musical Transcription.

Agus' noted musical collaboration with other musicians include cellists Nathaniel Rosen and Jeffrey Solow, accordionist/composer Nick Ariondo, and violinists Sherry Kloss and Roberto Cani.

=== Association with Jascha Heifetz ===
- Violin student in Heifetz's USC master class, 1971–1973
- Piano accompanist for Heifetz's USC master class and its auditions, 1973-1984
- Heifetz's personal accompanist and collaborator for music transcription, 1984–1987

=== Recording artist ===
Agus has recorded three albums, and has collaborated with a number of other artists as an accompanist or chamber group member. She combined her talents on both violin and piano on the album Ayke Agus Doubles which was created by using a Yamaha Disklavier piano to mechanically record her piano keystrokes for the accompaniment, which was then played back on the special instrument while she recorded the violin solo with it.

=== Performance artist ===
Agus has performed as a violin and piano soloist, as a piano accompanist, chamber group member, and orchestra member throughout the United States, Asia, and Europe, including venues such as the House of Composers, St. Petersburg, Russia, and the Disney Concert Hall in Los Angeles. On at least two occasions (2004 and 2008), she was a soloist on both instruments playing with the California Philharmonic Orchestra in the same concert.

Her piano playing has been described as that which "other pianists talk about with awe", and having a "swinging sense of rubato equal to the composer's challenge."

Her violin playing has been described as "illuminated with brilliance like that found in the rays of the sun," and "reminded us of Yehudi Menuhin."

=== Chamber music affiliations ===
- Ariondo-Agus Duo
- Pacific Serenade Chamber Music Society
- The Ayke Agus Piano Trio
- The South Bay Chamber Music Society (1991–1997)
- Guest artist with various European professional music groups, including the Ysaye String Quartet and the Jacques Thibaud String Trio

== Career as a writer, composer and educator ==
=== Author ===
Agus published Heifetz As I knew Him in 2001, chronicling her 15 years with the violinist, and touching on both of their childhood experiences as well as a significant treatment on the Art of Collaboration as Heifetz taught it.

=== Transcriber ===
Agus helped Heifetz transcribe over 50 transcriptions for violin and piano. The last one, An American in Paris, by Gershwin, was left unfinished by Heifetz. Agus continued their work on this piece and published it after Heifetz's death.

=== Instructor ===
Agus gives master classes and teaches piano, violin and chamber groups in her private studio.

=== Lecturer ===
Since Heifetz's death in 1987, Agus has given numerous lectures in Europe, Asia and the US on the subject of The Art of Musical Collaboration, which she learned during her 15-year association with Heifetz. The most notable of these was given on October 27, 2009, at the Rimsky-Korsakov St. Petersburg State Conservatory in Russia.

She has given lectures at the Royal Academy of Music in London, the La Jolla Summer Music Festival, the Colburn School of Performing Arts, University of Maryland, and University of Iowa City.

Agus also being appointed as an academic advisor to Music LifeStyle Academy which one of the reputed music schools in Singapore, landmark of Asia since 2014.

== Discography ==
=== Piano ===
==== Soloist ====
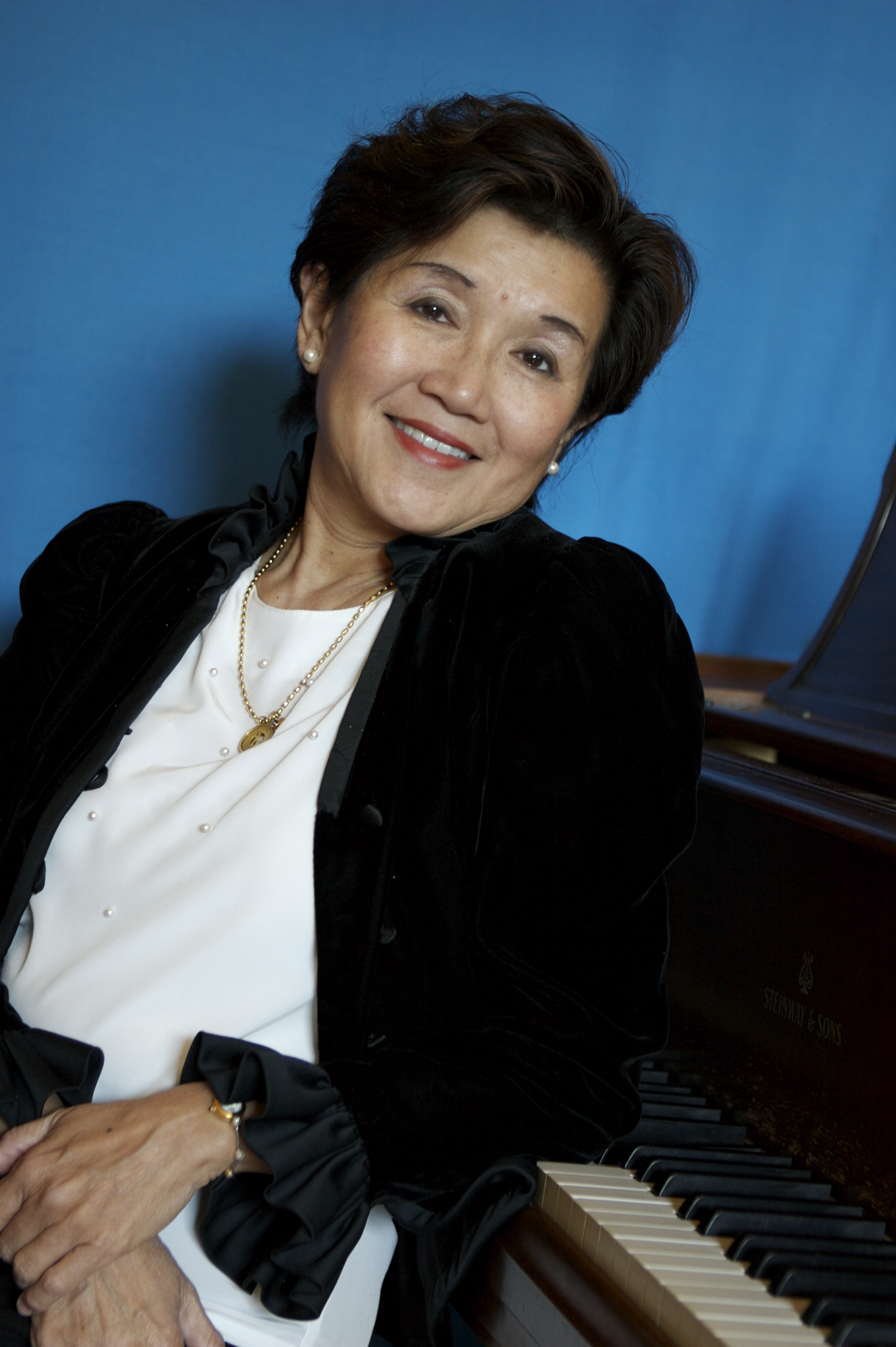

- Musical Mementos of Jascha Heifetz
- Ayke Agus Plays Schubert
- Where Dreams Become Sunlight

==== Accompanist ====
- Ayke Agus Doubles
- The Infinite Trumpet, with trumpetist Malcolm McNab
- Treasured Vignettes for Violin and Piano, with violinist Yukiko Kamei
- Sherry Kloss Plays Forgotten Gems, with violinist Sherry Kloss
- 3 Faces of Kim, the Napalm Girl: No. 3. Fearful, with violinist Deon Nielsen Price
- Sun Rays, with pianist Deon Nielsen Price and vocalist Darryl Taylor

=== Violin ===
==== Soloist ====
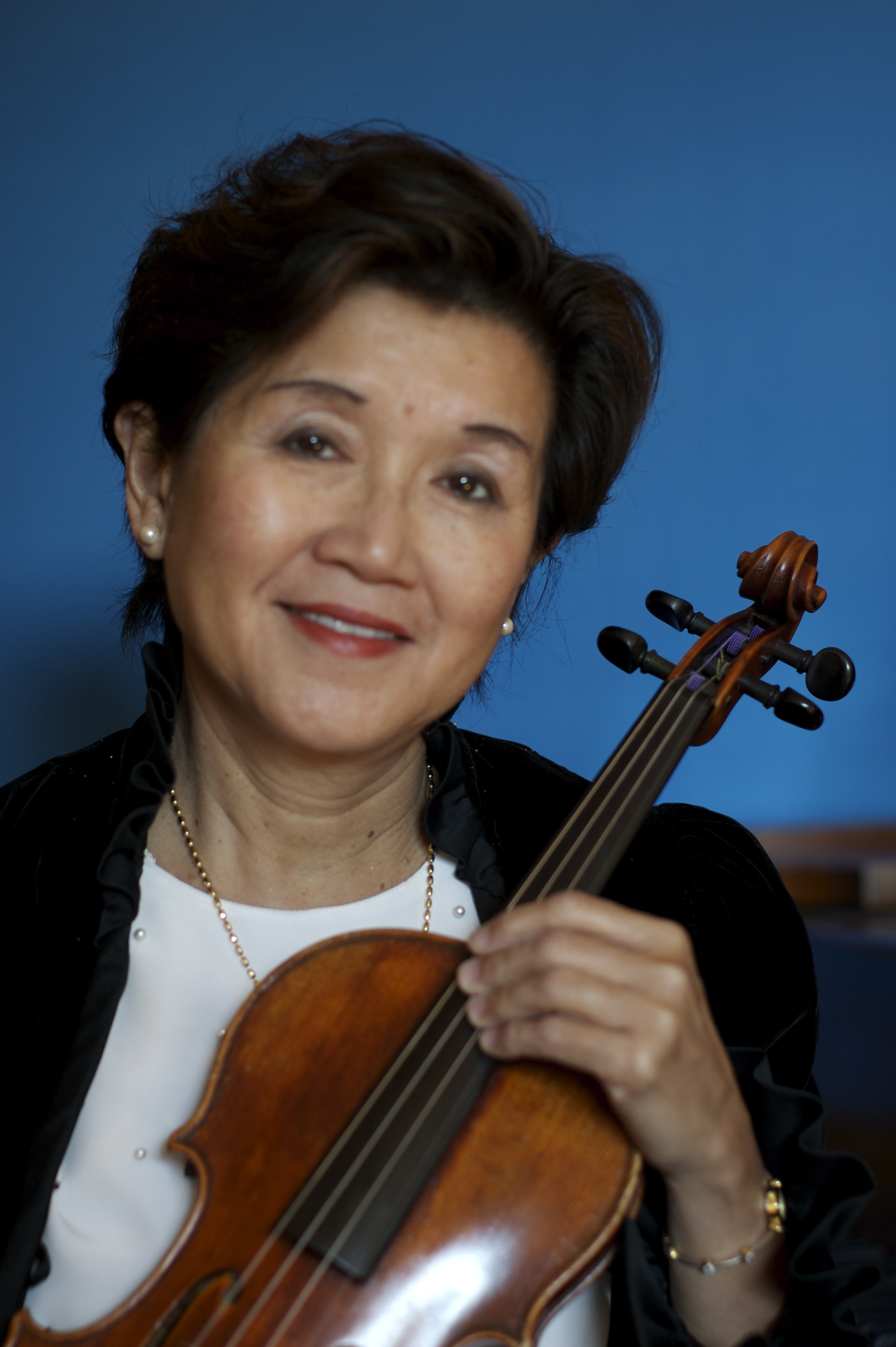

- Ayke Agus Doubles
- Stille Antico

==== Chamber music ====
- The Hall of Mirrors, A Quartet of Chamber Works by Mark Carlson (Pacific Serenades)
- Sun Rays (Crossroads Alley Trio)
