= Mattel Vidster =

Digital tapeless camcorder

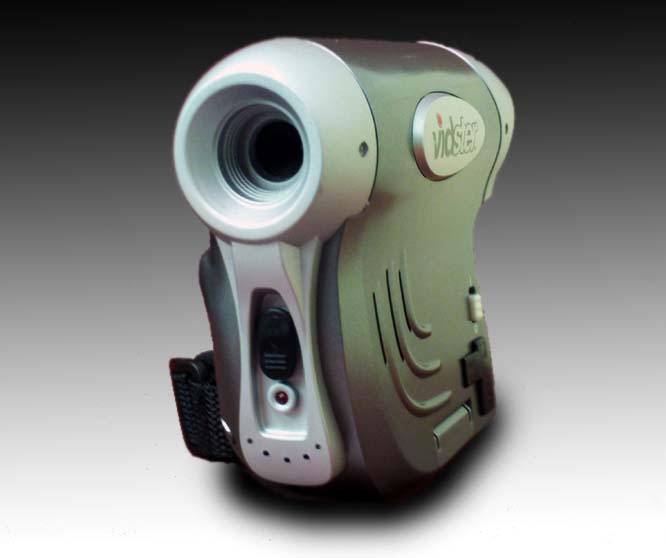
The Mattel Vidster

The Mattel Vidster is a digital tapeless camcorder that was marketed as a children's toy and sold around 2005. It features a 1.1-inch (28 mm) LCD, a 2x digital zoom, and records into AVI 320x240 video files encoded with the M-JPEG codec at 15 frames per second, with 22 kHz monaural sound. It also takes still photos with 1.3 megapixel resolution.

The camera is powered by four AA batteries, and records onto SD flash memory cards (512MB maximum capacity). The variable-bitrate codec allows a maximum recording time of approximately 45–50 minutes with a 512MB card. Other features include a built-in microphone, a 1/8" jack for an external microphone, a 1/8" jack that provides NTSC composite video output with audio, a mini-USB connector for accessing the data on the SD memory card, and a tripod mount.

The Vidster is appreciated for the unique aesthetic properties of the video footage it records. Since the M-JPEG video created by the Vidster is so highly compressed, the footage exhibits constantly visible macroblocks, or square blocky artifacts from encoding. The Vidster only has auto-exposure as a method of exposure control, and also is constantly automatically white-balancing itself. This leads to very accentuated alterations in the qualities of the image, even from small changes in a scene. The lens of the Vidster is extremely small, resulting in an image with slight vignetting of image sharpness. There is also significant color fringing and video noise, especially for low-light subjects.

The Vidster is used in media projects by experimental filmmakers, just as the Fisher-Price Pixelvision camera was used to artistic effect by a previous generation of media artists.

== Film festivals ==
The Pixelvision friendly film festival, PXL THIS, inspired a Vidster film festival, calling it VIDSTER THIS.

== Influences on the web ==
- November 14, 2007—A Vidster user on YouTube created a community known as The Vidster Corner where people of all ages can share their Vidster videos on the Internet with the rest of the world.

== Notable uses in popular culture ==
- In 2009 the San Francisco-based indie rock band Girls released a video for their song Laura which was shot in its entirety on four Vidsters.
- In 2009 Oakland based video artist Will Erokan released GiftHorseTV Episode 5: TRIPTYCH, on Peralta TV. The episode consisted of three simultaneous channels of Video (shot on a Vidster) documenting his life in Olympia WA, during the year 2006. The format of the video was inspired by the Cut Up experiments William S. Burroughs conducted using traditional Newspaper Layout as a form. Highlights from the piece include Painting Tract Housing in Lacey, WA, Scrap Yard Swag's first concert, Saddam Hussein's execution, and Thomas Cooney/Reed Urban performing music around Olympia, WA.

== See also ==
- PXL-2000
- VCamNow
