= Swinging Steaks =

American roots rock/alternative country band

Swinging Steaks is a country band based in Boston.

The Swinging Steaks were formed in the late 1980s by former members of The Drive and friends. In 1991 they participated in the WBCN Rock & Roll Rumble. The Swinging Steaks' second album, Southside of the Sky (1993, Capricorn Records) introduced the band to a national audience with two top ten AAA radio singles and appearances on NBC-TV's Late Night with Conan O'Brien and NPR's Mountain Stage. Their four self-released albums, Suicide at the Wishing Well, Shiner, the live, acoustic Bare, and KickSnareHat have continued to expose the group to new audiences and garner them appearances at SXSW, CMJ Music Marathon and Nashville Extravaganza.

Creem magazine called them: "the best country-rock out of Boston since Harvard student Gram Parsons put together his International Submarine Band"

In 2005 the band released "Sunday Best" on First National Records in the U.S. and Blue Rose in Europe.

The band's name apparently comes from a restaurant in Mexican Hat, UT, called The Mexican Hat Lodge that bills itself as the "Home Of The Swinging Steak".

== Members ==
- Tim Giovanniello – vocals, guitar
- Jamie Walker – vocals, guitar, mandolin, slide
- Jim Gambino – vocals, piano, organ
- Paul Kochanski – vocals, electric and upright bass
- Steve Saddler – lap steel, dobro
- Joe Donnelly – vocals, drums, percussion
- Andy Plaisted – drums

== Discography ==
- Suicide at the Wishing Well
- Southside of the Sky, 1993, Capricorn Records
- Orphans of God, tribute to Mark Heard, 1996
- Shiner
- Bare
- KickSnareHat
- Sunday Best
- Live in '93
