= Girl Power (film) =

- Directed by: Sadie Benning
- Release date: 1992
- Running time: 15 minutes
- Country: United States
- Language: English

Girl Power is a queer feminist video made in 1992 by Sadie Benning with a Fisher-Price PixelVision camera. The video, which runs for 15 minutes, is considered at once a reflection on Benning's unhappy childhood and a celebration of her sexuality and the Riot grrrl subculture. The video was featured in "Pixel This Vision", a project organized by the Balagan Experimental Film & Video Series to "put together a program of the best of PixelVision"

The video is composed of home video footage featuring Benning as a young child, shots of notable pop culture figures (Blondie, Matt Dillon), scenes of theft captured by security cameras, cropped text from riot grrrl zines, grainy clips of explosive war sites, segments from famous films and television, "a homophobic diatribe delivered by American Nazi Party leader George Lincoln Rockwell", and alarming alerts such as "violent youth fierce and furious!" and "get ready for the shock of your life". Benning supplements this collage of taped footage with a compilation of audio: Bikini Kill songs, the Sugarhill Gang's "Rapper's Delight", dialogue from television commercials, and her own voice over and first-person narrative.

While Benning's videos have often been called "coming-out" narratives and are mostly screened at gay and lesbian festivals, Girl Power has been recognized for its formulation of the adolescent girl as a "gendered sign of cultural reorientation". The emergence of the female child as a subject of feminist discourse, as demonstrated in Benning's work, is considered a major outgrowth of 1990s cultural phenomena, and appears in everything from scholar Shulamith Firestone's The Dialectic of Sex to the music of pop icons, the Spice Girls.
