= Nick Ariondo =

American accordionist (born 1955)

- Born: Nicholas Ariondo; 7 September 1955 (age 71); Pittsburgh
- Occupations: accordionist, composer, pianist

Nicholas Ariondo (Born, 7 September 1955) is an American accordionist, composer, pianist. "Ariondo's skills as a composer and arranger contribute enormously to the effectiveness of his performances" Keyboard Magazine/Titus Levi

Throughout his career, Ariondo has composed and arranged original works for accordion. His videos cover diverse music styles and influences, from traditional folk to modern classical forms.

He is known for his work with various singers, such as Paul McCartney and Placido Domingo. A double Grammy Award winner with the Los Angeles Opera Orchestra, he became the first American to be awarded Italy's Ancona Prize for his "Kalamatiano for Viola & Free-bass Accordion" (ACCO-Music Publishing), a contemporary composition utilizing Greek dance music as displayed in this video. Ariondo received over twenty awards from the American Society of Composers, Authors and Publishers (ASCAP) for his compositions and arrangements. Willard Palmer, historian, pianist, accordionist, composer, and editor for Alfred Music Publishing, nominated Ariondo for inclusion into the International Who's Who in Music.

Ariondo has appeared as featured artist in the Los Angeles Times, Keyboard Magazine, Accordion Arts, Strings Magazine Journal of the American Viola Society and in several international accordion-related newsletters & periodicals. Upon review of Ariondo chamber work for viola and accordion, Strings Magazine wrote "the combination was fresh to the ears: Ariondo, a virtuoso accordion player, gave a dazzling performance, exchanging bravura variations with the violist. They should go on the road with this one!"

== Background ==
Nick Ariondo was born in Pittsburgh, Pennsylvania and started private accordion lessons at age 7 under the tutelage of TV personality Mario DiNardo. Whilst still new students, Nick and his older brother, Anthony, began playing for church functions, fashion shows and family events in the late 1950s before traveling to the west coast. Nick's ethnic background is Italian-American: parents Nick Ariondo, Sr. and Grace (Nese) Ariondo. His grandparents came to the U.S from Naples, Italy.

== Education ==
Nick Ariondo's early talents were soon discovered when the family moved to California in the early 1960s, studying accordion with multi-instrumentalist Ford Bosman, with foremost classical accordionist Anthony Galla-Rini, with noted jazz accordionist Tommy Gumina, jazz saxophonist/flutist Buddy Collette and with classical pianist/lecturer/teacher Dr. Milton Stern. At age 16, Galla-Rini entered Ariondo into the Western States Accordion Festival, winning the Virtuoso Category performing Liszt's “Rhapsody Espanol” while acquiring a Certificate of Merit for Artistic Services from the Los Angeles City Bureau of Music. In his early twenties, he attended Los Angeles City College, was elected to the Alfa Chapter of Epsilon Alpha Gamma and upon graduation, was presented the Hugo Davise Composition Award for his “String Quartet No.1”. Ariondo continued studying arranging, orchestration & composition at California State University at Los Angeles where in 1987, he received the Distinguished Music Alumnus Award from the CSULA Friends of Music. During his studies at CSULA, he was accepted into the piano and string master classes of concert pianist Dr. Milton Stern and string pedagogue Noumi Fischer where Ariondo transcribed, adapted and arranged music for accordion with piano, violin, viola, cello and string bass. In 1976 he received a Bachelor of Arts Degree in Music and four years later a Master of Arts Degree in composition and performance with special emphasis toward the utilization and integration of the accordion in chamber music settings. His masters thesis recital "Interaction and Integration of the Accordion in Chamber Music" encompassed a variety of music styles and genres from the baroque and classical to ragtime, gypsy, improvisational to the avant-garde mixed with accordion, strings, woodwinds and voices. Ariondo continued performing, composing and arranging while developing a vast repertoire for the years ahead. His work in the opera field with director/vocal coach Wendel Phillips led Ariondo into performing and arranging operatic arias and duets directly from the piano scores, accompanying a variety of singers in concert with accordion and small ensembles, a valuable learning experience into the world of operatic literature and understanding the vocal concept of accompaniment.

== Career ==
At 17 years old, Ariondo was soloist and accompanist in the Café Russe Cabaret Theatre production in Hollywood, CA., performing with international singers and dancers of varied backgrounds and cultures.

In the early 1970s, Ariondo was hired as the solo musician at Kavkaz Russian-Armenian Restaurant in West Hollywood, California, where he accompanied international artists Vigen Derderian (famous Persian-Armenian singer), Assyrian composer/violinist Sooren (Suren) Alexander, Inna Miraeva (Russian Romani songstress), Lonia and Berta (Russian romanis from Brazil), Rima Rudina and Hratch Yacoubian (violinists/entertainers). He worked with romani/classical violinist Shony Alex Braun as music director in concerts at the Wilshire Ebell Theatre, toured with violinist Rima Rudina as a duo act throughout the U.S. and was a three-time winner of the International Grand Prix Competitions sponsored by the Accordion Federation of North America. In later years, he also concertized with esteemed Jascha Heifetz protege Ayke Agus, forming the Ariondo/Agus Duo.

Ariondo has also received much critical praise. Hailed American composer Lukas Foss personally wrote Ariondo in 1988 saying, “I am impressed by your music, by the way you write for accordion and by your playing: so precise, so powerful.” Critics have referred to Ariondo as..."the Yehudi Menuhin of the accordion".

The L.A. Times called him the "Pre-eminent L.A. accordionist"...."the irrepressible avant-garde accordionist!”...."infinitely expressive, technically dazzling!"...."a force to be reckoned with!" Ariondo was featured onstage with Plácido Domingo in L.A. Opera's World Premiere “IL Postino” by Daniel Catán televised on PBS Great Performances and distributed on DVD by Sony Entertainment. The Artistry of Nick Ariondo has appeared “live” on radio stations throughout the West Coast, on cable television and KCET's Classic Arts Showcase. In 1987, after a standing ovation and a riveting performance of Nikolai Chaikin's Concerto for Accordion and Orchestra at UCLA’s Royce Hall, eminent conductor Zubin Mehta called Ariondo “a brilliant success!”

That same year Ariondo received the Distinguished Music Alumnus Award by CSULA’s Friends of Music for “achievement and dedication to his musical craft.” Ariondo worked closely with Britain's acclaimed composer Thomas Adès in the Los Angeles premiere of “Powder Her Face” and in 1990, received an Artists Fellowship Grant from the California Arts Council awarded to “those artists who have demonstrated exemplary professional achievement in their fields.”

Guest television appearances include Dancing with the Stars, The Late Late Show with Craig Ferguson with violinist Nicola Benedetti and his music arrangements of Russian folk songs were featured in the Warren Beatty film “Love Affair” (Warner Bros.). His accordion can be heard on several film scores, including the Oscar-winning Life of Pi, Rio 2, Knight and Day, Happy Feet Two, and Bridesmaids in a cameo appearance.

Return performances of The Nick Ariondo Trio became a favorite among audiences at Paolo Soleri’s Arcosanti, Arizona’s architectural wonder 65 miles north of Phoenix (Ariondo's 2015 solo concert featured his original compositions dedicated to Paolo Soleri and Arcosanti).

In 2012 Ariondo was the featured artist to perform in Long Beach Opera’s production of Ástor Piazzolla’s “María de Buenos Aires” receiving rave reviews. Ariondo's concert repertoire highlights his arrangements and compositions of over 200 works ~ solos, duets, trios, small to large ensembles - vocal and with orchestra, including an accordion concerto co-composed with colleague Edward Hosharian (a memorial tribute video) . Ariondo's publisher is ACCO-Music Publishing and Accordiondo Music.

== Selected compositions ==
- Kalamatiano for viola & free-bass accordion
- Duo for double bass & free-bass accordion
- Fantasia for solo viola
- Concerto in G Minor for accordion & orchestra (Hosharian/Ariondo)
- Matsuri (Festival) for piano & accordion
- Global Dance
- Musette a la Russe
- Valse Brillante
- Tango Indo-Serene for violin, accordion & piano
- Tarantella for soprano & accordion
- Variations on a Jazz Theme for piano & accordion
- Impromptu for violin, clarinet & accordion
- Arabesque for accordion & strings
- Lucenta Sera (Evening Lights)
- Stella Notte (Starry Night)

== Discography ==
=== As leader ===
- 2005 Trilucence

=== As sideman or guest ===
- 2000 Peggy's Blue Skylight, Andy Summers
- 2004 Variety Orchestra, Brian Woodbury
- 2005 Sings the Peggy Lee Songbook, Bette Midler
- 2009 Ice Age: Dawn of the Dinosaurs [Original Motion Picture Soundtrack], John Powell
- 2010 Knight and Day [Original Motion Picture Soundtrack], John Powell
- 2011 Happy Feet Two [Original Motion Picture Soundtrack], John Powell
- 2012 Life of Pi [Original Motion Picture Soundtrack], Mychael Danna
- 2013 Monsters University [Original Score], Randy Newman
- 2013 Planes [Original Score], Mark Mancina
- 2014 Rio 2 [Score] [Original Motion Picture Soundtrack], John Powell
- 2016 Nobody But Me, Michael Bublé
- 2019 Lady and the Tramp [Score] [Original Motion Picture Soundtrack]
- 2025 Lush Life: The Lost Sinatra Arrangements, Seth MacFarlane
- 2026 Toy Story 5, Randy Newman [Score] [Original Motion Picture Soundtrack] [17]
