= James Sewell Ballet =

Non-profit ballet company

The James Sewell Ballet is a ballet company of eight dancers founded in Minneapolis, Minnesota, in 1990 by James Sewell and Sally Rousse.

== History ==
James Sewell Ballet (JSB) was founded in 1990 by James Sewell and Sally Rousse in New York City. In 1992, Sewell and Rousse moved the company to Minneapolis, Minnesota, Sewell's hometown, where it has resided for nearly two decades.
