= PXL2000 =

1987 toy video camera

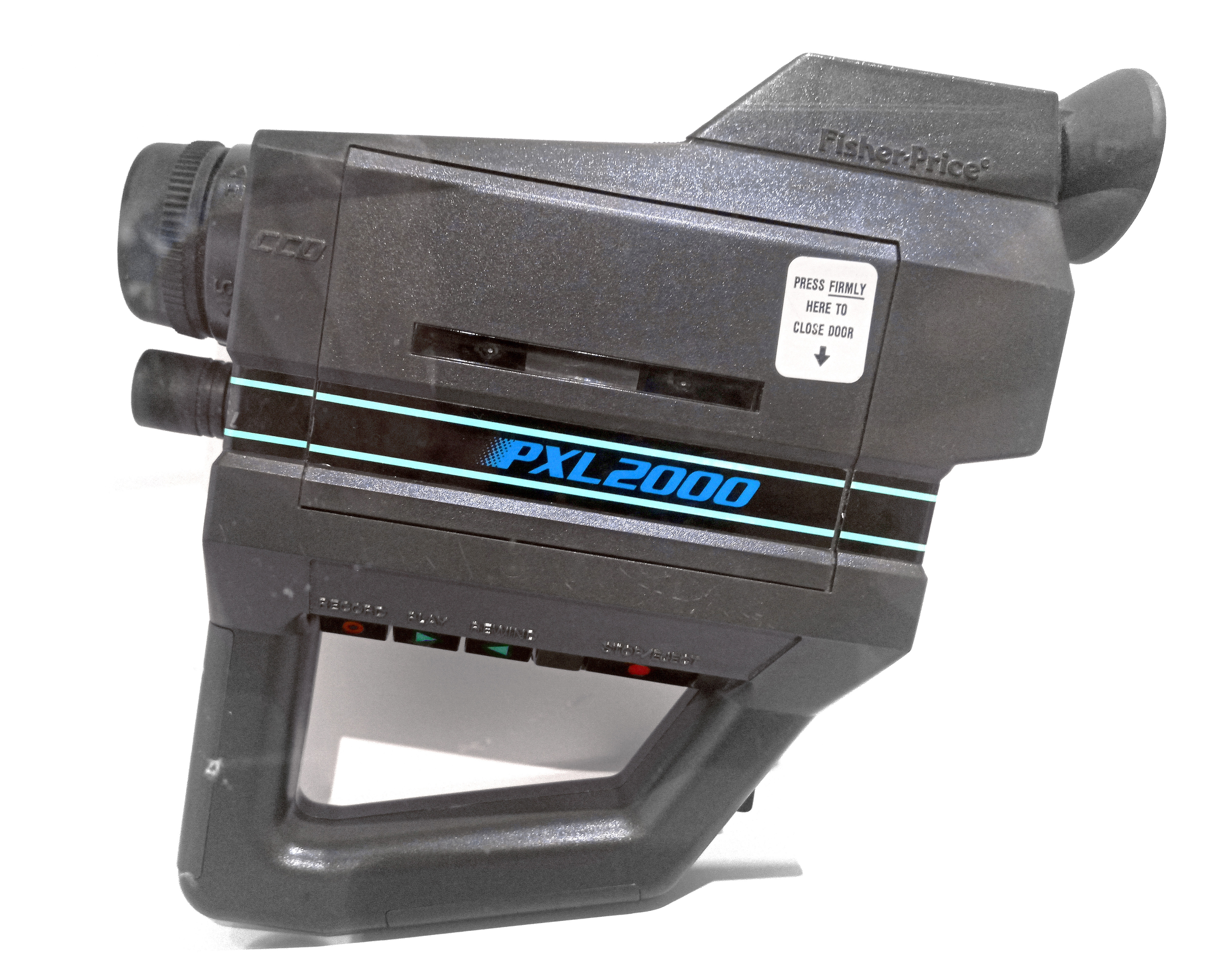
- Variant models: 3300 and 3305; PixelVision, Sanwa Sanpix1000, KiddieCorder, and Georgia
- Manufacturer: Fisher-Price
- Introduced: 1987; 39 years ago
- Batteries: 6 AA batteries

Video shot in 1994 with a PXL2000

The PXL2000, or Pixelvision, was a toy black and white video camera, introduced by Fisher-Price in 1987 at the International Toy Fair in Manhattan, which could record sound and images onto Compact Cassette tapes. It was on the market for one year with about 400,000 units produced.

After that one year, it was pulled from the market, but rediscovered in the 1990s by low-budget filmmakers who appreciated the grainy, shimmering, monochrome produced by the unit, and the way in which its lens allowed the user to photograph a subject an eighth of an inch away from the camera, and pull back to a long shot without manipulating a dial, while keeping as the background and the foreground in focus. It is also appreciated by collectors, artists, and media historians, and has been used in major films and spawned dedicated film festivals.

== Development ==
The PXL2000 was created by a team of inventors led by James Wickstead. He sold the invention rights to Fisher-Price in 1987 at the American International Toy Fair in Manhattan.

== Design ==
The PXL2000 consists of a simple aspherical lens, an infrared filter, a CCD image sensor, a custom ASIC (the Sanyo LA 7306M), and an audio cassette mechanism. This is mounted in a plastic housing with a battery compartment and an RF video modulator selectable to either North American television channel 3 or 4. It has a plastic viewfinder and some control buttons.

The system stores 11 minutes of video and sound on a standard audio cassette tape by moving the tape at nearly nine times normal cassette playback speed. It records at roughly 16.875 inches (428.6 mm) per second, compared to a standard cassette's speed of 1.875 inches (47.6 mm) on a C90 CrO_{2} (chromium dioxide) cassette. In magnetic tape recording, the faster the tape speed, the more data can be stored per second. The higher speed is necessary because video requires a wider bandwidth than standard audio recording. The PXL2000 records the video information on the left audio channel of the cassette, and the audio on the right.

In order to reduce the amount of information recorded to fit within the narrow bandwidth of the sped-up audio cassette, the ASIC generates slower video timings than conventional TVs use. It scans the 120 × 90 pixel CCD 15 times per second, feeding the results through a filtering circuit, and then to a frequency modulation circuit driving the left channel of the cassette head, as well as to an ADC, which creates the final image for viewing.

For playback and view-through purposes, circuits read image data from either a recorded cassette or the CCD and fill half a digital frame store at the PXL reduced rate, while scanning the other half of the frame store at normal NTSC rates. Since each half of the frame store includes only 10800 pixels in its 120 × 90 array, the same as the CCD, the display resolution was deemed to be marginal, and black borders were added around the picture, squashing the frame store image content into the middle of the frame, preserving pixels that would otherwise be lost in overscan. An anti-aliasing low-pass filter is included in the final video output circuit.

== Marketing ==
The PXL2000 was not a commercial success. It was introduced at US$179 (equivalent to about $510 in 2025) and later reduced to $100 (equivalent to about $280 in 2025); expensive for a product marketed as a child's toy. It did see some interest from amateur video artists who considered it affordable. The PXL2000 was produced in two versions: model #3300 with just the camera and necessary accessories; and #3305 for $50 more adding a portable black and white television monitor with a 4.5-inch (110 mm) screen. Extra accessories were sold separately, such as a carrying case.

It was also sold as Fisher-Price PixelVision, Sanwa Sanpix1000, KiddieCorder, and Georgia.

== Revival ==
The PXL2000 has received a minor revival in popularity since the 1990s among filmmakers, due to its point-and-shoot simplicity and low-grade aesthetic. Because the unit is degradable and obsolete, its use is aligned with a certain romanticized mortality, unfit for serious mainstream appropriation. Erik Saks wrote this: "Each time an artist uses a PXL2000, the whole form edges closer to extinction."

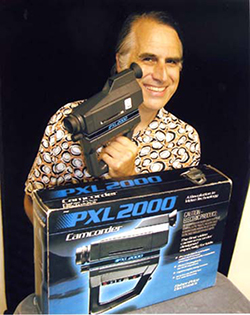
Gerry Fialka, founder, organizer, and curator of the PXL THIS Film Festival

In 1990, Pixelvision enthusiast Gerry Fialka founded PXL THIS, a film festival dedicated to projects shot exclusively on the PXL2000. The festival continues to occur annually in Los Angeles, California, usually at the Beyond Baroque Literary Arts Center and the Echo Park Film Center, with Fialka continuing as organizer and curator. Although the festival operates without a budget, it still manages to tour many locations including the San Francisco Cinematheque and Boston's MIT campus. Festival entries, oral history interviews, and other relevant materials donated by Fialka are being processed into the Performing Arts and Moving Image Archives at the University of California, Santa Barbara Library. Recalling the PXL2000's initial promise of accessibility, Fialka's vision includes accepting submissions indiscriminately, juxtaposing the works of established artists with those of amateurs and children.

PXL2000 cameras have been used occasionally in professional filmmaking, with camera modifications to output composite video, enabling it to interface to an external camcorder or VCR.

== Productions ==
The PXL2000 was used by Richard Linklater in his 1990 debut film, Slacker. A roughly two-minute performance art sequence within the film is shot entirely in PixelVision.

Peggy Ahwesh's Strange Weather (1993), which follows several crack cocaine addicts in Florida, was shot entirely on a PXL2000. This video relies heavily on the camera's portability to maintain an intimate presence.

Video artist Sadie Benning is among the most critically acclaimed pioneers of the PXL2000, one of which was given to them by their father James Benning around the age of 15. Benning's early video diary works gained popularity in the artist market, earning them a lasting reputation as an innovator, with an important presence in video art.

Michael Almereyda used the camera for several of his films. Another Girl Another Planet (1992) and his short Aliens (1993) were shot entirely with it; it was used for point of view shots of the title character in Nadja (1994), and it was used by the title character to make video diaries in Hamlet (2000).

The camera has been used for several music videos, including "Mote" by Sonic Youth and "Black Grease" by the Black Angels.

Artist John Humphrey's 2003 video, Pee Wee Goes to Prison was shot on a PXL2000, employing a cast of dolls and other toys to stage the imaginary trial, incarceration, and eventual pardoning (by newly-elected president Jesse Ventura) of Pee-wee Herman for the sale of Yohimbe.

The PXL2000 was used by the characters Maggie (Anne Hathaway) and Jamie (Jake Gyllenhaal) in the 2010 film, Love & Other Drugs, although the black-and-white footage from the camera is shown at full film resolution.

In 2018, Toronto filmmaker Karma Todd Wiseman used a PXL2000 to shoot key scenes, processing the footage with enhanced monochrome. The custom PXL2000 camera was fitted with windshield-mount suction cups and painted with the red and white paint scheme of the Canadian flag.

The PXL2000 was used by the characters Melody and Jess during the show Archive 81.

== See also ==
- Mattel Vidster
- Toy camera
- VCamNow
