= Enemy Ace =

Fictional character

Hans von Hammer
- Cover to Showcase #57 (July/August 1965) featuring The Enemy Ace (art by Joe Kubert).

Publication information
- Publisher: DC Comics
- First appearance: Our Army at War #151 (February 1965)
- Created by: Robert Kanigher; Joe Kubert

In-story information
- Full name: Hans von Hammer
- Team affiliations: Five Warriors from Forever

Enemy Ace (German: Feindliches Ass) is a DC Comics property about the adventures of a skilled but troubled German anti-hero and flying ace in World War I and World War II, Hans von Hammer, known to the world as "The Hammer of Hell". Debuting in 1965, the comic was written by Robert Kanigher and drawn by Joe Kubert and the character has been revived several times since by other writers and artists.

== Overview ==
Enemy Ace first appeared in Our Army at War #151 (February 1965), in a backup story that quickly gained popularity. As a World War I pilot flying for the Germans, his stories told the German side of the war, in which Hans von Hammer was a man of honor and chivalry, a flying knight in his Fokker Dr.I, but he was haunted by his duties and the constant death surrounding them.

The cover of Star Spangled War Stories #148, highlighting the fatal fall of Von Hammer's puppy, Schatzi.

The early series stories centered around World War I aerial combat and the tactics employed by the early knights of the air, along with their honor. The stories were often a stark contrast between the dark brooding character Von Hammer and his softer, kinder side as in Star Spangled War Stories #148 where Von Hammer rescues a little dog he names "Schatzi" and proceeds to befriend him, even introducing him to his dark hunting companion the gray wolf who accepts little Schatzi rather than eating him. The Von Hammer stories were not big on happy endings, and Von Hammer goes on to lose Schatzi in a haunting scene by dropping him accidentally from his Fokker during air combat. He grieves the loss of the dog, then proceeds to massacre the remaining British pilots in an act of bloody revenge. Von Hammer was a dark character, portrayed as the inevitable result of war.

Unlike most comic book characters, Von Hammer does not have an arch-enemy, though a French pilot known as The Hangman was a persistent opponent. The majority of Von Hammer's opponents follow the same code of honor as he does, which includes not attacking a helpless pilot.

Created by Robert Kanigher and Joe Kubert, the Enemy Ace was based loosely on Manfred von Richthofen. Both flew Crimson Red Fokker DR1 triplanes. Both were of aristocratic blood. Both awarded themselves a trophy with each downed enemy plane. Both were the highest scoring flying ace of the First World War. The main difference between the two was that Von Hammer survived to old age, whereas Von Richthofen was shot down and killed before the war ended.

The character's stories have been praised as among DC's strongest war stories of the Silver Age of comic books. He was revived for a few graphic novels. The first was Enemy Ace: War Idyll (1990) by George Pratt, where Hammer is revealed to have lived until 1969, dying peacefully upon turning over his memoirs to and concluding his interviews with a troubled Vietnam War veteran-turned-journalist.

Tim Truman's Guns Of The Dragon 1998 mini-series saw Von Hammer in 1927 China teaming up with an elderly Bat Lash and Biff Bradley, the brother of Slam Bradley against Miss Fear and Vandal Savage on an adventure to Dinosaur Island.

Cover of Enemy Ace - War in Heaven TPB.

A more recent work is Garth Ennis's Enemy Ace: War in Heaven (2001), with art by Chris Weston and Russ Heath. Here, von Hammer's character and story arc is based on several real-life German pilots, notably Adolf Galland. The series recounts the pilot's activities during World War II where he is persuaded to once again fight as a pilot of the Luftwaffe. Von Hammer is placed in charge of his own gruppe and initially serves on the Eastern Front. Though no friend to the Nazi regime, he rapidly amasses numerous kills flying a red-painted Bf 109 against the Russians, and later in defense of Germany (flying a scarlet Me 262) against American bombers. Nevertheless, von Hammer becomes increasingly disillusioned as he continues to witness the horrors of war. During a battle, he is shot down and crashes near Leningrad. In his attempts to make it back to his own lines, he witnesses many horrible sights on the Russian front, including cannibalism. In 1945, after bailing out of his damaged aircraft, he inadvertently parachutes into the Dachau concentration camp and is outraged to discover the German perpetration of the Holocaust. His patience with the Nazi regime at an end, Von Hammer proposes a mutiny upon returning to his airbase and later surrenders his Jagdverband to advancing Allied troops, namely Sgt. Rock's Easy Company, after setting fire to the fighter unit's remaining aircraft.

Von Hammer makes a guest appearance of sorts as an opponent of General Wade Eiling's father in a tale set during the First World War.

In 2008, he is featured in Bruce Jones' The War that Time Forgot. He also appears in Booster Gold in 2009, during World War I. When Booster is thrown back in time and caught in the middle of the war, alongside Cyrus Lord, the ancestor of Maxwell Lord, von Hammer aids their escape from captivity behind German lines rather than abet their torture and further stain his hands with blood.

In Dark Nights: Death Metal, Enemy Ace is among the superheroes who Batman resurrects using a Black Lantern ring.

== Von Hammer's descendants ==
A possible descendant of Von Hammer appears in the story "Ghost of the Killer Skies" in Detective Comics #404 (Oct. 1970). Batman investigates sabotage and murder taking place during shooting of a biographical film based on Von Hammer. The mastermind behind the sabotage is stunt pilot Heinrich Frans, who bears a strong resemblance to Von Hammer and claims that he was his ancestor. Believing that Von Hammer was a ruthless man, Frans is outraged that the film's story has his ancestor showing respect and mercy to his enemies, despite Batman countering that Von Hammer's story is more one of "a man caught between his feeling of duty and his own best instincts". Frans falls to his death during an aerial duel with Batman, both men using vintage World War I planes. During the duel, it is heavily implied that the spirit of Von Hammer helps Batman pilot his craft far better than the crimefighter could on his own. At the end, it is not confirmed if Heinrich Frans was indeed Von Hammer's descendant.

In issue #139 of the Robin series, von Hammer's great-granddaughter Lieutenant Ilsa von Hammer appeared as part of a group of soldiers that included Johnny Cloud's grandson and a legendary soldier known only as the Veteran. This group, handling missions which may be more unusual than the normal military is equipped for, recruits Robin to assist on their missions.

Another possible descendant appears in Superman #689. Will Von Hammer works as a private investigator in Berlin. He possesses some superhuman invulnerability as he is also the descendant of World War II hero Stormy Foster. In DC's 'New 52' Shade mini-series, Will helps the Shade in tracking down the latter's past.

Swamp Thing #86-87 revealed von Hammer and his father, Otto von Hammer, to be ancestors of the Arcane family (Anton, Gregori, Anais, Aniela, Abigail, Tefé, and others).

An unnamed gorilla wearing Enemy Ace's costume appears in 2019's Superman's Pal Jimmy Olsen. He is part of Gorilla City's air defenses and previously battled Jimmy Olsen, who had been transformed into a giant ape and caused havoc in the city. In the present, he shows up alongside a myriad of minor characters to help Jimmy fight a robot invasion.

== Von Hammer's aircraft ==
- Fokker Dr.I - World War I
- Messerschmitt Bf 109F - early World War II
- Messerschmitt Bf 109G - Eastern Front
- Messerschmitt Me 262 - used late war until surrender.

Note: Not only are all of Von Hammer's aircraft painted bright red, his World War II aircraft lacked the standard swastika insignia on the tail, which causes friction with one of his officers who is fervently loyal to the Nazi Party.

== Collected editions ==
There have been a number of trade paperback collections as well as original graphic novels:

- Enemy Ace: War Idyll (by George Pratt, graphic novel, 128 pages, hardcover (1990), softcover (1995), ISBN 0-930289-78-1)
- The Enemy Ace Archives (by Robert Kanigher and Joe Kubert):
  - Volume 1 (212 pages, October 2002, hardcover, ISBN 1-56389-896-9, collects: Our Army at War (1952) #151, #153, #155; Showcase (1956) #57-58; Star-Spangled War Stories (1952) #138-142)
  - Volume 2 (196 pages, September 2006, hardcover, ISBN 1-4012-0776-6), collects: Star Spangled War Stories (1952) #143-145, #147-150, #183, #200) The copy on the dust jacket does not accurately reflect the contents. It says "completing the collection of all of the original Kanigher/Kubert Enemy Ace tales (and adding in collaborations with artists Neal Adams, Russ Heath and Frank Thorne), this volume's ten stories display some of comics' greatest talents at the peak of their creative powers..." The book contains 13 stories and does not include any stories by Neal Adams, but is credited with one story as artist WITH Joe Kubert (issue #144-"Death Takes No Holiday"..). Two Enemy Ace-branded stories from Our Army at War #146 are not included in this collection as they are not, in fact, Enemy Ace stories. They were both retitled reprints of previously published non-Enemy Ace stories ("Balloon for a Hawk" from Our Fighting Forces #60, retitled as "No! I will not go up in that papier mâché coffin!" and "My Brother, The Enemy Ace!" from All-American Men of War #101, retitled as "Brother Enemy!"), each with a single Kubert-drawn introductory page added (featuring Von Hammer).
- Enemy Ace: War in Heaven (by Garth Ennis and Robert Kanigher, with art by Chris Weston, Russ Heath, Christian Alamy and Joe Kubert, collects 2-issue mini-series and Star Spangled War Stories #139, 128 pages, 2003, ISBN 1-56389-982-5)
- Showcase Presents: Enemy Ace Volume 1 (552 pages, Black & White, January 2008, ISBN 978-1-4012-1721-1, collects: Detective Comics (1937) #404; Men of War (1977) #1-3, #8-10, #12-14, #19-20; Our Army at War (1952) #151, #153, #155; Showcase (1956) #57-58; Star Spangled War Stories (1952) #138-145, #147-150, #183, #200; Unknown Soldier #251-253, #260-261, #265-267)

== In other media ==
- Enemy Ace appears in the Batman: The Brave and the Bold episode "Aquaman's Outrageous Adventure!", voiced by John DiMaggio.
- Black Wolf and his Fokker DR-1 received a deluxe action figure from DC Direct.
- A vampiric Von Hammer appears in Kim Newman's Anno Dracula universe novel The Bloody Red Baron.
- A parody of Enemy Ace named Baron Von Reichs-Pudding, an incompetent German pilot from the Great War, appears in Sparky Comics.

== See also ==
- Manfred von Richthofen
- Adolf Galland
- Harry von Bülow-Bothkamp
