= Abby Holland =

Fictional comic book character in the DC Comics Universe

- Abby Holland and Swamp Thing as depicted in Swamp Thing #22 (February 2006). Art by Eric Powell.

Publication information
- Publisher: DC Comics
- First appearance: Swamp Thing #3 (March 1973)
- Created by: Len Wein; Bernie Wrightson

In-story information
- Full name: Abigail Arcane Cable Holland
- Abilities: Empathy, Telepathy, Telekinesis

Abigail Arcane Cable Holland is a fictional comic book character in the DC Comics Universe. She is the spouse/partner of Swamp Thing and the mother of Tefé Holland. Holland's psychic powers include empathy, telepathy and telekinesis. She first appeared in Swamp Thing #3 (March 1973) and was created by Len Wein and Bernie Wrightson.

Crystal Reed portrays Abby Holland in DC Universe's Swamp Thing television series.

== Fictional character biography ==
=== Early years ===
Abby Holland is born Abigail Arcane, in Transylvania, Romania in late 1955. Her uncle Anton Arcane frames her mother Anise for witchcraft, leading her to be executed by superstitious villagers. Abby's father Gregori is forced to share custody of Abby with Anton and is busy with foreign business commitments, leaving Abby to her uncle's abuse. During this time, she is interested in nature and eventually becomes a nurse.

When Abby refuses to do Arcane's bidding, he ousts her from Castle Arcane and vows to destroy her. Gregori is killed attempting to rescue Abby, but Anton resurrects him as the Patchwork Man, a member of his Un-Men.

Swamp Thing saves Abby's life for the first time. Artwork by Bernie Wrightson

In the 1970s, Abigail meets American government agent Matthew Cable. Abby soon begins her friendship with him, swaying Cable's suspicions of her possible involvement in her uncle's abduction of the fugitive Swamp Thing. Matt and Abby then witness the destruction of Castle Arcane, seemingly killing Anton. Abby is then abducted by the Patchwork Man, but Swamp Thing rescues her.

The next day, Abby expresses interest in emigrating to the United States and working with Cable in his search for Swamp Thing. Cable cannot guarantee he will find work for Abby but keeps his promise to have her registered as a U.S. citizen in due time. During the plane trip to Cable's homeland, Cable and Abby are confronted by a Scottish werewolf and his parents, who wish to cure him with Cable's blood. Swamp Thing destroys the werewolf with a silver chandelier and saves Cable and Abby yet again, allowing them to safely depart for America.

Once home, Matt becomes determined to find and unravel the secrets of the Swamp Thing. Abby vows to stay by his side through it all. Matt's employers send him on another mission, however, but as fate would have it, Swamp Thing's travels bring him to the same location: Bürgess Town, Vermont. Matt and Abby are taken hostage by The Conclave, the same criminal organization that created the Swamp Thing by the act of sabotage that took Alec Holland's life and caused the transformation of his corpse into a supernatural elemental form. Swamp Thing succeeds in rescuing Matt and Abby from their captors' sadistic torture of them in Gotham City, and exacts revenge on his enemies, even confronting the Batman.

Sometime after Abby's 18th birthday in late 1973, she and Matt spend time healing and swimming at a Florida beach. Abby begins to develop feelings for Matt. She wisely reminds him that truth is nebulous and that he must try to discover the truth about the Swamp Thing, when next confronting him.

Months later in 1974, Abby accompanies Matt into the Louisiana Bayou for the first time. She instantly falls in love with the swamp, and Matt has to keep her focused and alert. They are soon captured by political extremist Zachary Nail and his allies, the prehistoric Conqueror Worms. There, Abby and Matt take on a new companion, Jefferson Bolt. The Swamp Thing once again helps his friends, but fails to save Bolt's girlfriend, Ruth. Abby finds herself standing in-between the two men, constantly stopping their arguments over the Swamp Thing. They finally settle this by staging the Swamp Thing's dramatic capture.

During the Swamp Thing's confinement, Matt learns the shocking truth: that the creature in fact believes himself to be Alec Holland. Matt relates this news to Abby, who urges him to correct his mistake, now that she has developed even stronger empathic feelings for "Alec" than for Matt. Owing Alec their lives, Abby and Matt manage to fake the Swamp Thing's death with explosives, but only with the reluctant assistance of Bolt. However, Swamp Thing refuses to rejoin his friends and returns into hiding in the swamp.

Hurricane Carmen prevents Abby and her friends from beginning their search for Alec, so they decide to wait out most of the hurricane season.

By 1975, 19-year-old Abby joins Matt in a confrontation with the demon Nebiros to save Swamp Thing from possession. Abby telepathically senses Alec's soul in a mystical globe and urges Matt to smash it. Freed, Swamp Thing battles and defeats the demon, who is soon forced back to Hell, after entering the body of the dying priest Jonathan Bliss, who had made the misguided attempt to incite Armageddon by invoking the demon in the first place.

The group soon discovers Bolt's abduction by the Conclave. The search takes them to the dangerous island of Kala Pago, where they confront the head of the Conclave for the last time, Nathan Ellery. Ellery's death at the hands of the Swamp Thing does not bring them relief, however, as their journey to Florida brings them into conflict with a Satanic cult seeking to defy the mortal effects of old age, by stealing life energies from the young. Abby goes into a trance and displays telekinesis to escape her bonds. She then steals the book used for the spell and telepathically summons Swamp Thing to the rescue of Cable and Bolt. However, Alec once again leaves his friends behind, prompting yet another pursuit of him.

Later that summer, Abby, Matt and Bolt locate the Swamp Thing in Benson's Swamp, just outside Gatorberg, Florida. Abby has an unpleasant experience in Sloan's Diner, as the owner's bigoted feelings about Indians invade her thoughts and force her to run outside to seek relief. The group then redoubles its efforts to track down the Swamp Thing. However, what they find is a mindless duplicate, driven mad and attacking everyone in sight. The creature is blown up with dynamite, thus allowing the real Swamp Thing to avoid his friends, now that they think he is dead.

=== New developments ===
After Matt has a subsequent encounter with the Doom Patrol sometime later he returns to Abby, now in her 20s, declares his love and proposes marriage which Abby accepts. Despite the happy start of this union, all does not go well for the Cables. Matt often frequents strip bars without Abby's knowledge. He then uncovers evidence of an illegal autopsy of Linda Holland by his employers. To conceal this, they have Cable electroshocked, making him a terrible burden on his young new wife, as he is driven to drink due to his resulting loss of his mental faculties.

By the end of 1983, 28-year-old Abby is working at the New Moon Motel Diner in West Virginia to support herself and Matt, for his drinking has only become worse. One evening while feeding a stray dog some scraps outside, she encounters Alec and they have a joyous reunion. She then startles him with the news that she is now married to Matt. Alec then introduces Abby to his new friends, Lizbeth Tremayne and Dennis Barclay. Abby takes all of them to see Matt, who is at last confronted by Alec over his alcoholism. Abby at last learns the truth of what happened in Gatorberg, although Matt's confession for the group is more surprising.

Alec and Abby are then abducted by Arcane and his new insectoid Un-Men. While at first they seem to be doomed to Arcane, Alec's associate Helmut Kripptmann manages to save them by destroying both Arcane and himself. Alec then saves Abby from the falling insectoid ship by plunging into a nearby lake. Swimming to shore, Abby leaves Alec and returns home to Matt, who swears he will stop drinking. Abby does not believe him. She goes outside again for a walk. Then she sees Matt rush outside at the sound of an approaching helicopter. Abby pushes Matt into some bushes, as the helicopter shoots a rocket that blows up their house. Meanwhile, Dennis and Liz escape a similar explosive death trap back at the motel, while the Swamp Thing is shot down and declared dead by the National Guard, while all of his surviving friends all go into hiding.

In 1984, Abby and Matt return to Louisiana to search for Alec, hoping that he was not killed. They begin living in the town of Houma, where the couple make many friends, though they usually spend their time alone. They soon find the Swamp Thing has taken root in the ground. They are approached by Jason Woodrue, who explains the situation to them, including the recent revelation that the Swamp Thing was never Alec Holland, but a mass of swamp life that absorbed Holland's consciousness. Abby later returns alone to the rooted Swamp Thing, crying and telling "Alec" that he is "human" before leaving.

On her next visit, Abby is attacked by Woodrue who attempts to kill her repeatedly. The Swamp Thing unroots himself, saving Abby, and confronts Woodrue, but not before he kills the population of Lacroix. After ending Woodrue's threat and turning him over to the Justice League, Swamp Thing returns his attention to Abby. They settle the matter that he is not Alec Holland, but he is happy to have her in his life. They become loving and devoted friends.

As Abby's relationship with Swamp Thing continues to grow, her marriage to Matt Cable falls apart. Abby spends more time with Swamp Thing, returning to the simple outdoor pleasures she enjoyed in her childhood. While relaxing after swimming at a lake, Abby informs him she is now working at Elysium Lawns, a home for troubled autistic children. Later that evening, she goes to Baton Rouge to buy supplies, but witnesses an accident while John Constantine spies on her unnoticed in the crowd.

Abby then meets Jason Blood, who informs her the children are in danger. She takes this as a threat, and she warns him to not get involved. That night, Abby senses the coming supernatural danger at Elysium Lawns and rushes there with Swamp Thing, where they confront the demons Monkey King and Etrigan. Abby walks home alone in the end, and is picked up by her husband. She is unaware he is possessed by Arcane.

Abby informs Swamp Thing her marriage is better. She calls him "Alec" again and he tells her not to. However, after he has buried the ghost of Alec Holland, he tells her that he will be proud to use the name Alec. Later, Abby determines the truth behind Matt Cable's radical changes and comes to the horrific realization that Matt and all of his new working associates are zombies, and that she has been raped by her undead uncle when she thought he was her husband. Abby attempts to escape, but Arcane prevents her. He then proceeds to magically murder her. Once she is dead, Arcane brings Swamp Thing to his house to find Abby's dead body. Alec mourns Abby's loss, then confronts Arcane. Matt Cable's soul re-emerges and damns Arcane to Hell. Matt uses the remaining magic to re-animate Abby's body, though he fails to retrieve his wife's soul. Having suffered a car crash before giving in to Arcane, Cable slips into a deep and permanent coma. Swamp Thing journeys into the afterlife to save Abby's soul himself, helped by Deadman, the Phantom Stranger, the Spectre, and Etrigan. Afterwards, Abby and Alec marry.

=== Marriage to Swamp Thing ===
Abby's marriage to Swamp Thing proves to be as challenging as everything else in her life. One evening, she senses Alec is in distress and rushes out to him. Hiding from a police squad searching the bayou, Abby realizes that others must be in danger, too. She finds Alec dying from toxic waste poisoning. He warns her to keep away from him, and that he will find a way to restore himself in a new body before expiring.

True to his word, the Swamp Thing lives again, in a tiny plant that Abby psychically locates and helps to nurture, while Alec regrows himself. He is impressed by Abby's remarkable devotion to him. One day, the unique couple is visited by the mystic occultist John Constantine, who begins to manipulate Swamp Thing in exchange for valuable information about his elemental powers.

Eventually, Alec's travels bring him home on a mission in Louisiana, dealing with a cursed plantation plagued by 19th-century ghosts and zombies. Abby's inner strength proves invaluable, as she helps to evacuate the survivors. During the course of her relationship with Alec, Abby learns to accept his bizarre abilities and strange habits, such as ingesting dead or dying animals into his body, or unexpectedly growing himself out of her bathroom sink to visit her. One night, Abby even mistakes one of Alec's abandoned husks for him. She makes him promise that he will never die for as long as she lives.

=== The New 52 ===
Following The New 52 continuity reboot, Abigail's history with Swamp Thing is significantly altered. In this new world, Abigail is alive during modern times, and has a half-brother named William Arcane. Both are connected to the Rot, a cosmic force associated with death and decay. During the run, she becomes the Avatar of the Rot, forcing her to not be with Swamp Thing.

== In other media ==
=== Television ===
- Abby Holland appears in Swamp Thing (1990), portrayed by Kari Wuhrer.
- Abby Holland appears in Swamp Thing (1991), voiced by Tabitha St. Germain. This version is Anton Arcane's stepdaughter.
- Abby Holland appears in the Robot Chicken DC Comics Special, voiced by Clare Grant.
- Abby Holland appears in Swamp Thing (2019), portrayed by Crystal Reed. This version is a CDC doctor from Marais, Louisiana.

=== Film ===
- A character loosely based on Abby Holland and Matthew Cable named Alice Cable appears in Swamp Thing (1982), portrayed by Adrienne Barbeau. She is a government agent.
- Abby Holland appears in The Return of Swamp Thing, portrayed by Heather Locklear. This version is Anton Arcane's stepdaughter who disapproved of him marrying her mother.
