= Swamp Thing =

Fictional character, an elemental creature in the DC Comics Universe

- Character art of Swamp Thing (Alec Holland) by co-creator Bernie Wrightson, taken from a splash page of Swamp Thing #6 (October 1973).

Publication information
- Publisher: DC Comics
- First appearance: Alexander Olsen: House of Secrets #92 (July 1971); Alec Holland: Swamp Thing #1 (October–November 1972); Levi Kamei: Infinite Frontier #0 (May 2021)
- Created by: Len Wein; Bernie Wrightson

In-story information
- Alter ego: Alec Holland
- Species: Plant elemental
- Team affiliations: Justice League; Parliament of Trees; Justice League Dark; Lords of Chaos; Justice League United
- Partnerships: Poison Ivy; John Constantine; Abigail Arcane
- Supporting character of: John Constantine
- Notable aliases: Avatar of the Green, The Force of Nature, Guardian of the Green
- Abilities: Often the embodiment of the cosmic energies connected to all plant life ("The Green"), he possess various powers in which includes: Manipulation of plant matter; allows for changing shape and size, travelling through time, and can appear in places where there's life.; Superhuman strength, durability, and possess regenerative powers. Can also grow wings out of plants to allow for flight,

Swamp Thing is a fictional character appearing in American comic books published by DC Comics. While several incarnations of the character have since debuted, the original was created by writer Len Wein and artist Bernie Wrightson and first appeared in House of Secrets #92 (July 1971). The character found perhaps its greatest popularity during the original 1970s Wein/Wrightson run and in the mid-late 1980s during a highly acclaimed run under Alan Moore, Stephen Bissette, and John Totleben.

In each incarnation of the character, the Swamp Thing is often depicted as a swamp monster that resembles an anthropomorphic mound of vegetable matter seeking to protect nature. Known as the Avatar of the Green, Swamp Thing is an the embodiment of the cosmic energies that gives life to all plant life in the known universe (dubbed "The Green") and is considered the champion of the Parliament of Trees, the collective guiding and collective consciousness of all plant life.

The first Swamp Thing was Alexander Olsen, a scientist who was killed by his assistant vying for the affections of his wife. Returning as a swamp creature after his body is dumped, he takes revenge on his killer, but his wife runs off, unable to recognize him. He later becomes a local legend in Louisiana.

The most well-regarded incarnation is the second version, Alec Holland. Once a chemist working on a compound to enable plant growth in hostile environments, Holland is seemingly transformed by his own creation after his death at the hands of criminal elements. In some stories he is a plant creature believing himself to be Alec, possessing his memories, while later stories make him the genuine Alec who transforms into the Swamp Thing. This version is also a reluctant ally of John Constantine and a later member of the Justice League Dark, considered a powerhouse among their ranks.

In 2021, a new incarnation is created as Levi Kamei, a young Indian scientist descended from a tribunal connected to the Kaziranga wetlands, whose power awakens following a tragedy. This version exists concurrently within the mainstream DC Universe alongside Alec and is more prominently a roster member of the Titans.

The character has been adapted from the comics into several forms of media, including feature films, television series, and video games. The character made his live-action debut in the film Swamp Thing (1982), with Dick Durock playing the Swamp Thing, while Ray Wise played Alec Holland. Durock played both Swamp Thing and Holland in the sequel film The Return of Swamp Thing (1989). Durock reprised the role again in the television series Swamp Thing (1990). The Swamp Thing was played by Derek Mears with Andy Bean playing Alec Holland in the television series Swamp Thing (2019). Another live-action film adaptation, titled Swamp Thing, is in development as an installment of the DC Universe (DCU) media franchise.

IGN ranked him 28th in the Top 100 Comic Book Heroes list.

== Concept and creation ==
In 1971, DC Comics editor Joe Orlando contacted writer Len Wein for a last-minute eight-page backup story for House of Mystery. Wein came up with the idea for the character while riding a subway in Queens. He later recalled, "I didn't have a title for it, so I kept referring to it as 'that swamp thing I'm working on'. And that's how it got its name!" According to publisher Jenette Kahn, Orlando added the story's twist ending. Bernie Wrightson designed the character's visual image, using a rough sketch by Wein as a guideline. Wrightson completed the eight-page story in one weekend with the assistance of Michael Kaluta (who also modeled for the story's villain) and Jeff Jones, who inked two of the pages.

Wein and Wrightson developed a specific visual style for the stories, including yellow thought balloons and orange speech balloons, since "it was such an extraordinary effort for him to speak...whenever a caption referred to him, it was drippy like a swamp."

== Publication history ==
=== Volume 1 ===
Cover of Swamp Thing #1 (October–November 1972), art by Bernie Wrightson

Len Wein was the writer for the first 13 issues, before David Michelinie and Gerry Conway finished up the series. Burgeoning horror artist Bernie Wrightson drew the first 10 issues of the series, while Nestor Redondo drew a further 13 issues, the last issue being drawn by Fred Carrillo. The original creative team worked closely together; Wrightson recalled that during story conferences, Wein would walk around the office acting out all of the parts. The Swamp Thing fought against evil as he sought the men who murdered his wife and caused his monstrous transformation, as well as searching for a means to transform back into his human form.

The Swamp Thing has since fought many villains. Though they only met twice during the first series, the mad scientist Anton Arcane (with his obsession with gaining immortality) became the Swamp Thing's nemesis, even as the Swamp Thing developed a close bond with Arcane's niece Abigail Arcane. Arcane was aided by his nightmarish army of Un-Men and the Patchwork Man, alias Arcane's brother Gregori Arcane who, after a land mine explosion, was rebuilt as a Frankenstein Monster-type creature by his brother. Also involved in the conflict was the Swamp Thing's close friend-turned-enemy Lt. Matthew Joseph Cable, a federal agent who originally mistakenly believed the Swamp Thing to be responsible for the deaths of Alec and Linda Holland.

As sales figures plummeted towards the end of the series, the writers attempted to revive interest by introducing fantastical creatures, aliens, and even Alec Holland's brother, Edward (a character that was never referred to again by later writers) into the picture.

The last two issues saw the Swamp Thing transformed back into Alec Holland and having to fight one last menace as an ordinary human. The series was cancelled with issue #24 and a blurb for a 25th issue containing an upcoming encounter with Hawkman led nowhere. Alec Holland's transformation back into the Swamp Thing was covered in Challengers of the Unknown #81-87, within which the Swamp Thing is enlisted by the titular team to fight the Lovecraftian cosmic threat M'nagalah, whom the Swamp Thing had encountered during Wein's run.

=== The Saga of the Swamp Thing and Volume 2 ===
Cover of The Saga of the Swamp Thing (vol. 2) #21 (February 1984), art by Tom Yeates

In 1982, DC Comics revived the Swamp Thing series, attempting to capitalize on the summer 1982 release of the Wes Craven film of the same name. A revival had been planned for 1978, but was a victim of the DC Implosion. The new series, called The Saga of the Swamp Thing, featured an adaptation of the Craven film in its first annual. Now written by Martin Pasko, the book loosely picked up after the Swamp Thing's guest appearances in Challengers of the Unknown #81-87, DC Comics Presents #8, and The Brave and the Bold #176, with the character wandering around the swamps of Louisiana seen as an urban legend and feared by locals. Pasko's main arc depicted the Swamp Thing roaming the globe, trying to stop a young girl (and the possible Anti-Christ) named Karen Clancy from destroying the world.

When Pasko had to give up work on the title due to increasing television commitments, editor Len Wein assigned the title to British writer Alan Moore. When Karen Berger took over as editor, she gave Moore free rein to revamp the title and the character as he saw fit. Moore reconfigured the Swamp Thing's origin to make him a true monster, as opposed to a human transformed into a monster. In his first issue, he swept aside most of the supporting cast that Pasko had introduced in his year-and-a-half run as writer and brought the Sunderland Corporation to the forefront, as they hunted the Swamp Thing down and "killed" him in a hail of bullets. The subsequent investigation revealed that the Swamp Thing was not Alec Holland transformed into a plant, but actually a wholly plant-based entity created upon the death of Alec Holland, having somehow absorbed duplicates of Holland's consciousness and memories into himself. He is described as "a plant that thought it was Alec Holland, a plant that was trying its level best to be Alec Holland". This is explained as a result of the plant matter of the swamp absorbing Holland's bio-restorative formula, with the Swamp Thing's appearance being the plants' attempt to duplicate Holland's human form. This revelation resulted in the Swamp Thing suffering a temporary mental breakdown and identity crisis, but he re-asserted himself in time to stop the latest scheme of Floronic Man.

Issue #32 was a strange twist of comedy and tragedy, as the Swamp Thing encounters an alien version of Pogo, Walt Kelly's character.

Moore would later reveal, in an attempt to connect the original one-off Swamp Thing story from House of Secrets #92 to the main Swamp Thing canon, that there had been dozens, perhaps hundreds, of Swamp Things since the dawn of humanity, and that all versions of the creature were designated defenders of the Parliament of Trees, an elemental community which rules a dimension known as "the Green" that connects all plant life on Earth. Moore's Swamp Thing broadened the scope of the series to include ecological and spiritual concerns while retaining its horror-fantasy roots. In issue #37, Moore formally introduced the character of John Constantine the Hellblazer as a magician/con artist who would lead the Swamp Thing on the "American Gothic" storyline. Alan Moore also introduced the concept of the DC characters Cain and Abel being the mystical reincarnations of the Biblical Cain and Abel caught in an endless cycle of murder and resurrection.

The Saga of the Swamp Thing was the first mainstream comic book series to completely abandon the Comics Code Authority's approval.

With issue #65, regular penciler Rick Veitch took over from Moore and began scripting the series, continuing the story in a roughly similar vein for 24 more issues. Veitch's term ended in 1989 due to a widely publicized creative dispute, when DC refused to publish issue #88 because of the use of Jesus Christ as a character, despite having previously approved the script in which the Swamp Thing is a cupbearer who offers Jesus water when he calls for it from the cross. The series was handed to Doug Wheeler, who made the cup that the Shining Knight believed to be the Holy Grail to be a cup used in a religious ceremony by a Neanderthal tribe that was about to be wiped out by Cro-Magnons, in the published version of issue #88. In issue #90, Wheeler not only reintroduced Matango, a character that Stephen Bissette had introduced in Swamp Thing Annual #4, but he also completed Veitch's story arc that intended to have Abby Holland give birth to the human-plant hybrid elemental Tefe Holland.

After a period of high creative turnover, in 1991 DC sought to revive interest in Swamp Thing by bringing horror writer Nancy A. Collins on board to write the series. Starting with Swamp Thing Annual #6, Collins moved on to write Swamp Thing (vol. 2) #110–138, dramatically overhauling the series by restoring the pre-Alan Moore tone and incorporating a new set of supporting cast members into the book. Collins resurrected Anton Arcane, along with the Sunderland Corporation, as foils for the Swamp Thing. Her stories tended to be ecologically based and at one point featured giant killer flowers.

With issue #140 (March 1994), the title was handed over to Grant Morrison for a four-issue story arc, co-written by the then-unknown Mark Millar. As Collins had destroyed the status quo of the series, Morrison sought to shake the book up with a four-part storyline which had the Swamp Thing plunged into a nightmarish dreamworld scenario where he was split into two separate beings: Alec Holland and the Swamp Thing, which was now a mindless being of pure destruction. Millar then took over from Morrison with issue #144, and launched what was initially conceived as an ambitious 25-part storyline where the Swamp Thing would be forced to go upon a series of trials against rival elemental forces. Millar brought the series to a close with issue #171 in a finale where the Swamp Thing becomes the master of all elemental forces, including the planet.

=== Volume 3 ===
Written by Brian K. Vaughan and drawn by Roger Petersen and Giuseppe Camuncoli in 2001, the third Swamp Thing series focused on the daughter of the Swamp Thing, Tefé Holland. Even though she was chronologically 11–12, the series had Tefé aged into the body of an 18-year-old with a mindwipe orchestrated by the Swamp Thing. Constantine and Abby try to control her darker impulses, brought about by her exposure to the Parliament of Trees. Due to the circumstances under which she was conceived, the Swamp Thing, possessing John Constantine, was not aware that he was given a blood transfusion by a demon. She held power over both plants and flesh.

Believing herself to be a normal human girl named Mary who had miraculously recovered from cancer three years prior, she rediscovers her powers and identity when she finds her boyfriend and best friend betraying her on prom night. In a moment of anger, her powers manifest and she kills them both. Tefé then fakes her own death and embarks on a series of misadventures that take her across the country, and ultimately to Africa, in search of a mythical "Tree of Knowledge".

During this series, it seems that the Swamp Thing and Abigail have reunited as lovers and are living in their old home in the Louisiana swamps outside Houma. The home in which they live more closely resembles the one that the Swamp Thing constructs for Abigail during the Moore run than the home in which they dwell during the Collins run. In a confrontation with Tefé, the Swamp Thing explains that he has cut himself off from the Green and there seems to be no trace of the god-like powers he acquired from the Parliaments of Air, Waves, Stone or Flames during the Millar run. Also, Vaughan's Swamp Thing does not seem to have been divorced from the humanity of his Alec Holland self. The disconnection between these two entities becomes a plot point in Volume 4.

=== Volume 4 ===
A fourth series began in 2004, with writers Andy Diggle (#1–6), Will Pfeifer (#7–8) and Joshua Dysart (#9–29). In this latest series, the Swamp Thing is reverted to his plant-based Earth elemental status after the first story line, and he attempts to live an "eventless" life in the Louisiana swamps. Tefé, likewise, is rendered powerless and mortal. Issue #29 was intended to be the final issue of the fourth volume, which was cancelled due to low sales numbers.

=== Return to the DC Universe ===
==== Brightest Day ====
The conclusion of the crossover event Brightest Day revealed that the Swamp Thing had become corrupted by the personality of the villain Nekron in the wake of the Blackest Night crossover event. The Swamp Thing now believed himself to be Nekron, similar to how he had once believed himself to be Alec Holland. The Swamp Thing went on a rampage in Star City, seeking to destroy all life on Earth. The Life Entity uses several heroes, including Hawkman, Hawkgirl, Firestorm, Martian Manhunter, Aquaman and Deadman, to slow the rampage while a new Swamp Thing was formed around the human remains of Alec Holland. Instead of merely thinking that it was Holland, this version of the Swamp Thing would actually be him. The new Swamp Thing defeated and killed the corrupted and original Swamp Thing. Restoring life to natural environments across the Earth, he declared that those who hurt the Green would face his wrath. He also restored Aquaman, Firestorm, Hawkman, and Martian Manhunter to normal. The book ended with the Swamp Thing resuming his original mission by killing several businessmen who engaged in deliberate, illegal polluting activities.

==== Brightest Day Aftermath: The Search for the Swamp Thing ====
This three–issue miniseries follows immediately after the events of Brightest Day, and follows the actions of John Constantine as he tries to work out what has changed with the Swamp Thing and track him down, with the assistance of Zatanna, Batman, and Superman.

=== Volume 5 ===
DC Comics relaunched Swamp Thing with issue #1 in September 2011 as part of The New 52, with writer Scott Snyder (#1-18 and Annual). Snyder's run concluded with "Rotworld", a crossover event between Swamp Thing, Animal Man and Frankenstein, Agent of S.H.A.D.E. Charles Soule wrote issues #19-40.

=== Volume 6 ===
A six–issue miniseries written by Len Wein, co-creator of the Swamp Thing, with art by Kelley Jones was released between March and August 2016. It follows Swamp Thing giving up his powers to Anton Arcane, who is disguised as Matt Cable.

This was followed by a Tom King winter special in 2018, also featuring Len Wein's last Swamp Thing issue.

=== The Swamp Thing ===
A 16-issue miniseries retitled with "The" written by Ram V with art by Mike Perkins began publication in March 2021. The book focuses on a new character named Levi Kami taking up the Swamp Thing mantle while Alec Holland is off-world. Originally planned as a 10-issue miniseries, The Swamp Thing was extended to 16 issues, with The Swamp Thing #10 followed by a short hiatus before returning in March 2022.

== Fictional character biography ==
In a secret facility located in the Louisiana bayous, scientist Alec Holland and his wife Linda invent a bio-restorative formula that can solve any nations' food shortage problems. Two thugs working for Nathan Ellery, head of the criminal organization the Conclave, barge into Holland's lab, knock him out, and plant a bomb in the facility. Holland wakes up as the bomb explodes. In flames, he runs into the swamp. His body is drenched in the bio-restorative formula, and this affects the plant life of the swamp, imbuing it with Holland's consciousness and memories. The newly conscious plant life forms a humanoid body and rises up from the bog as Swamp Thing, the latest in a long line of Earth elementals created when the Green is in need of protection.

Swamp Thing originally believes himself to be Alec Holland transformed into a monster. He seeks to regain his human body, but often meets opposition in the form of Anton Arcane and his Un-Men. After finally defeating Arcane, Swamp Thing is set upon by General Sunderland's men in a covert military operation. The resulting attacks blast a hole in Swamp Thing's head and destroys the lives of many of his friends. Sunderland brings Swamp Thing's body back to Sunderland Corp to study and unlock the secret of the bio-restorative formula.

Sunderland hires Floronic Man to study Swamp Thing's body, which he stores in a cryochest. Over the course of his research, Floronic Man deduces that Swamp Thing is a plant that thinks it is Alec Holland; the real Holland died in the explosion. Sunderland and Floronic Man part on bad terms, so the scientist uses Sunderland's automated computer systems to raise the thermostat in Swamp Thing's cryochest. This allows Swamp Thing's body to regenerate, and in his search for Sunderland, he stumbles across Floronic Man's report, which sends him into a mindless rage. He kills Sunderland and sets off for the swamps.

Swamp Thing goes into shock from learning his true origins. He roots himself into the swamp and spends three weeks dreaming; his mind eventually travels into the Green. Floronic Man returns to the swamp and discovers Swamp Thing's connection to the Green, but the experience drives him mad. Consuming parts of Swamp Thing's body, Floronic Man is able to influence plant growth worldwide. Swamp Thing catches up with Floronic Man and convinces the villain that his war against animal life is pointless, reminding him that plant life and animal life need each other to survive.

A budding friendship grows between Swamp Thing and Abby Cable, the niece of Anton Arcane. Her husband Matthew grows resentful of her disinterest in sex and turns to alcohol, further pushing her toward Swamp Thing. She asks for his help when her autistic students at Elysium Lawns are tormented by Kamara the Monkey King. Swamp Thing destroys the demon with the help of Etrigan the Demon. On the same night that the demon attacks, Matthew leaves to help Abby. His alcoholism causes him to crash his car, mortally wounding him. To stay alive, he makes a pact with the spirit of Anton Arcane, who possesses his body.

=== The Sprout ===
After reuniting with Abby, Swamp Thing travels to the Parliament of Trees, but is greeted with surprised horror. The Parliament had assumed Swamp Thing dead after he was attacked by Dwight Wicker and the Defense Department Intelligence, and had therefore begun to grow a sprout which would grow into a new elemental once bound with a human spirit. Swamp Thing's return triggers a crisis, as having two elementals active at one time would set the balance of nature awry and cause calamity. The Parliament gave him the choice to either take root in the Parliament, and leave Abby forever, or to kill the Sprout. Swamp Thing refused to do either, whatever the consequences. Swamp Thing takes control of John Constantine's body, displacing Constantine into the astral plane. In Constantine's body, Swamp Thing conceives a child with Abby who will act as the Sprout's host. After being sent back in time by the Claw, Swamp Thing returns to the present day in time to witness the birth of his daughter, Tefé Holland.

=== Brightest Day ===
Alec Holland returns to life via the Life Entity, while Swamp Thing has become a being of mindless destruction. Holland's last conscious memory was of hurling himself into the swamp to extinguish the flames engulfing him, having no memory of ever being Swamp Thing previously.

The Entity reveals Alec Holland as its champion and a missing, vital component of Swamp Thing itself. Unlike the previous incarnation, a mass of humanoid plant life with all of Holland's absorbed memories, this new, renewed Swamp Thing is generated directly from the body of Holland. The Entity gives Holland all of the powers of the Green that the former had wielded, including the additional elemental governance over fire. Holland defeats the corrupted Swamp Thing and restores the Green to its natural order.

=== The New 52 ===
In DC Comics's company-wide reboot The New 52, Alec Holland is brought back to life, but is haunted by the memories of Swamp Thing. Holland tries to put those memories behind him and live life as a carpenter in Louisiana, yet the Green continues to reach out for him. He is visited at work by Superman, who informs him of strange animal deaths across the world. Holland declines further investigating the matter as he explains to Superman his search for a normal life. He tells Superman how he tried returning to his botany work and successfully created a bio-restorative formula, destroyed it after experiencing a vision of the Green overrunning Earth. Later that night, Holland has nightmares of Swamp Thing and awakes to find his room covered in plants. He runs outside, this time to truly destroy the formula which he kept, only to be stopped by Swamp Thing.

Swamp Thing reveals himself to be Calbraith A. H. Rodgers, a World War II pilot who was shot down but transformed by the Green into Swamp Thing. Holland is reluctant to hear his message but allows him to speak. Rodgers tells Holland of the rise of Sethe and the Rot and Holland's importance as the next protector of the Green. Rodgers also confirms that Swamp Thing of Holland's memories was not him and that Holland is destined to be the greatest protector of the Green, a warrior king.

Holland is attacked and impaled by a member of the Rot, a force representing death and decay. As Holland is dying, he asks that the Parliament of Trees use their last bit of power to get the bio-restorative formula from his bag and turn him into Swamp Thing. The Parliament agrees to his plan, and breaks open the bio-restorative formula. Holland's human body is destroyed and replaced with plant matter, as he emerges from the pod as Swamp Thing.

During the run, Swamp Thing teams up with Animal Man to defeat the Rot and Anton Arcane, while making peace that Abigail and him can not be together. He is forced to destroy the Parliament when they attempt to betray him and deals with mechanical robots who plan to destroy and take over The Green. He fights a new enemy called the Gray, while meeting Cappucine who closely resembles Abigail Arcane.

=== Infinite Frontier ===
Alec Holland helps mentor Levi Kamei when he becomes the new Swamp Thing and plays a minor role in Dark Crisis when explaining to the heroes about Pariah and his connection to the Great Darkness.

== Powers and abilities ==
An Avatar of the Green, Alec as Swamp Thing possess the power to control the aforementioned "Green", cosmic energies which animate all plant life in the known universe and is often the living embodiment of it, possesses various powers: being capable of inhabiting and animating vegetable matter at will, including those with alien origin, and move towards places wherever there's life. Swamp Thing also possesses various esoteric abilities, including the ability to change its size and shape with control over the vegetable matter within their given body and can even travel through time, superhuman strength, and other attributes capable of contending with powerful adversaries of great strength and also possesses regenerative powers.

Swamp Thing is susceptible to chemical compounds which typically prove disastrous to plant life, making him capable of being poisoned. His powers can be impaired or completely disrupted if his connection to the Green is also cut off by mystical or scientific applications.

== Other versions ==
=== Swamp Thing (Alexander Olsen) ===
The original version of the Swamp Thing, Alexander "Alex" Olsen was a talented young scientist in Louisiana in the early 1900s, married to Linda. Alex's assistant, Damian Ridge, was secretly in love with Linda and plotted the death of his friend. He tampered with Olsen's chemicals, killing him in the explosion, and dumped his body in the nearby swamp. Ridge used Linda's grief to convince her to marry him. However, Ridge was confronted by Alex Olsen, now a risen humanoid pile of vegetable matter. Olsen killed Ridge, but Linda did not recognize him and ran away. Olson was left to wander the swamps alone. It was later explained that Olson accepted the offer of the Parliament of Trees to join them, allowing the role of Swamp Thing to be vacated for a more worthy successor.

=== Swamp Thing (Levi Kamei) ===
- First appearance: Infinite Frontier #0 (May, 2021)
- Created by: Ram V; Mike Perkins
- Teams: Titans; Justice League Dark; Justice League Unlimited
- Abilities: List: Plant-like physiology grants: Superhuman strength; Superhuman durability; Superhuman stamina; Regeneration; Immortality; Size alteration; Chlorokenisis; Time travel; Knowledge of science and botany

Levi Kamei is a fictional superhero appearing in American comic books published by DC Comics. Debuting in Infinite Frontier #0 (May, 2021) and created by Ram V and Mike Perkins, this version of Swamp Thing is an immigrant scientist from India specializing in biology. Characterized as experiencing a loss of familial and culture identity, the character seeks to regain it, stemming from his more progressive views in contrast to his family and community, who distrust foreign corporations and their environmental impact. Like prior Swamp Things, Kamei also acts as a protector of nature and is a recognized expert in environmentalism within the superhero community.

At a young age, Levi Kamei is unknowingly marked to become the Swamp Thing during a ritual performed to him and his brother, Jacob, by their mother. A descendant of a community that has watched over the Kaziranga wetlands for generations, he has differing views and later becomes a scientist for a foreign company, Prescot Industries. When his employers show interest in the Kaziranga wetlands, he attempts to help negotiate a deal with a community tribunal to sell the land in exchange for economic opportunities. The tribunal rejects the deal and protests ensue, but Prescot Industries use their political ties to force a deal and Levi's father is killed when the protests are violently broken up. A grieving Levi receives a vision of his future self as Swamp Thing and chooses to accept this new role in order to atone for his mistakes. Assisted by his girlfriend and fellow scientist Jennifer Reece to understand his power, others such as Amanda Waller and Prescot Industries seek to control him. Matters are also complicated when his rival in the Green is revealed to be his brother, now known as the Hadera. who believed he should have been the Avatar in place of his brother, having stronger environmentalist ideals. but falls towards using eco-terrorism to punish humanity for their crimes against nature. Conflict later escalates when Prescot Industries' interest in Levi as Swamp Thing results in them hiring Jason Woodrue, whose actions resurrects Levi's initial adversary, the Wanderer. Levi and his predecessor (existing as an extension of Levi's power to recall Alec's incarnation) becomes involved in the Dark Crisis on Infinite Earths storyline, wherein they're among the supernatural-affiliated questioning the Great Darkness's actions, having believed it too grand to meddle with mere mortals and joined Justice League Dark to assist them. With a team of superheroes, Levi helps investigate the Great Darkness's "corruption" and later lends his powers to Jon Kent to extract a machine revealed to be responsible for allowing the villain Pariah to manipulate a portion of the Great Darkness's power for his machinations. In the aftermath of Dark Crisis, Levi helps the Titans regrow an area of a rainforest and is recruited to the team as a part-time member to balance his role as the Avatar of the Green while lending his expertise.

Levi possess all the powers of the original Swamp Thing, with his body composed of vegetable matter and possessing superhuman strength, size changing abilities, and possess control over plant life, in which also enables him to transfer his consciousness and become functionally immortal. Like other past versions of the character, these abilities stem from his status as Avatar of the Green and controlling the cosmic force that animates all plant life known also as the "Green". Unique to him, he can shift between both his human form and Swamp Thing form. Kamei is also a gifted scientist knowledgeable in biology and botany; his abilities coupled with his advanced knowledge distinguish him from previous Swamp Things by enabling his superhuman form to adopt various chemical compositions of other flora for an advantage (i.e. having resistance against heavy metal toxicity by adapting chemical compositions from Pycnandra acuminata).

=== Past incarnations ===
- Allan Hallman: Alan Hallman was selected by the Parliament of Trees to be the planet's Earth elemental before Alec Holland became the Swamp Thing. He had been a scientist working on a formula to repair damaged crops when the Parliament chose him, and he died in flames, as all Earth elementals must. While traversing the Green, he was captured within a creature of the Grey, which broke him down and converted him into fungus and mold. He was recreated as an emissary of the Grey by Matango, who gathered Hallman's consciousness back together in his Chamber of Dreams. With Matango's return from Hell, Alan Hallman was released into the Green to find and capture the Swamp Thing and his daughter Tefé and force them to surrender their individuality to the Grey.
- Albert Höllerer: Albert Hollerer is a German airplane pilot who fought in World War II and was shot down over a bog in 1942. In the wake of his death in which he was burned alive, he became the Swamp Thing of that era. For years, he walked the Earth, keeping a small airplane toy with him as the only memory of his former life. In 1954, the creature finally found peace among the Parliament of Trees. (Note: This timeline corresponds with the fictional biography and dates of Hillman Periodicals' character The Heap, published 1942–1953.)
- Calbraith A. H. Rodgers: Calbraith A. H. Rodgers was born in England in 1920. Ever since he was a boy, he had heard whispers from the leaves, the flowers and the trees that something great and terrible would be waiting for him on the other side. Afraid of what would be waiting for him on the other side of death, he enlisted in the Royal Air Force to try and escape the pull of the Green. On May 3, 1942, on his fourth mission as a pilot during World War II, his plane was shot down. Landing in a swamp, the dying Rodgers felt the branches and petals reaching for him, delivering him to his new life as the protector of the Green. By fusing the man with the Green in the final moments of his life, the Swamp Thing was created.
- Lady Weeds: A predecessor of the Swamp Thing prior to avatars commonly adopting the "Swamp Thing" codename denoting their status. A Victorian era avatar active in the 1800s, she was known to be a particularly ruthless avatar who slayed all her rivals and managed to convince the Green to cease by first killing their latest rival who originated from Ireland before causing the Great Potato Famine, a symbolic gesture of her power. Recognizing her strength, they cease pitting rivals against her in her time.

=== Temporary incarnations ===
- Jon Haraldson: In the 2020 crossover event "Endless Winter", the spirit of Jon Haraldson, the Viking Prince was summoned to the present day and temporarily made an agent of the Green to become a new Swamp Thing and fight the Frost King. At the end of the story, he chose to return his spirit to Valhalla.
- Aaron Hayley: Aaron Hayley is an American soldier in World War II, who was slain and arose as the Swamp Thing. Since there was already an active plant elemental at the time (Albert Höllerer), he was only active as the Swamp Thing for a short time, and soon took his place among the Parliament of Trees.

=== Rival counterparts ===
- The Hedera: A supervillain appearing in The Swamp Thing comic book series featuring the Levi Kamei version of the character. The Hedera is a counterpart of the Swamp Thing whose current bearer is Levi's brother, Jacob Kamei. Being more of a environmentalist than Levi and having more profound knowledge of concepts relating to The Green and the Parliament of Trees, he becomes the mysterious villain known as Hedera. Adopting eco-terrorist methods, he seeks to kill humanity and is critical of the Swamp Thing's perspective in maintaining their humanity in spite of their actions against nature, making him a rival of the mantle.

=== Alternate universe versions ===
- An alternate universe version of Alec Holland appears in JLA: The Nail. This version is a presidential advisor who is later killed during an attack on the White House.
- An alternate universe version of Swamp Thing appears in DC Comics Bombshells. This version is a lesovik who fought alongside the Soviets during the Siege of Leningrad.

== In other media ==
=== Television ===
==== Live-action ====
A comic book ad for the 1990 TV series.

Derek Mears as Swamp Thing in a promotional still for the 2019 TV series.

- The Alec Holland incarnation of Swamp Thing appears in an anti-littering public service announcement aired on behalf of Greenpeace, coinciding with the release of the film The Return of Swamp Thing (1989).
- The Alec Holland incarnation of Swamp Thing appears in a self-titled TV series (1990), with Dick Durock reprising the title role from the original Swamp Thing films.
- Swamp Thing was rumored to appear in an episode of Constantine, but the show was cancelled before this could be proved or disproved.
- The Alec Holland incarnation of Swamp Thing appears in a self-titled TV series (2019), portrayed by Andy Bean and Derek Mears in a "physical costume" respectively. This version was created after Holland was killed while investigating a swamp-borne virus plaguing Marais, Louisiana before the swamp absorbed his memories and placed them in an anthropomorphic plant, which later became known as Swamp Thing.
  - Mears as Swamp Thing makes a cameo appearance in the Arrowverse crossover "Crisis on Infinite Earths" via archival footage from the episode "Loose Ends".
  - Mears as Swamp Thing makes a cameo appearance in the Titans episode "Dude, Where's My Gar?" via archival footage.

==== Animation ====
- Swamp Thing stories appear in Video Comics (1979–1981), an early series on Nickelodeon consisting of narrated comic book panels.
- The Alec Holland incarnation of Swamp Thing appears in a self-titled TV series (1991), voiced by Len Carlson.
- The Alec Holland incarnation of Swamp Thing makes a cameo appearance in the Justice League episode "Comfort and Joy".
- The Alec Holland incarnation of Swamp Thing appears in Justice League Action, voiced by Mark Hamill.
- The Alec Holland incarnation of Swamp Thing appears in Harley Quinn, voiced by Sam Richardson.

=== Film ===
==== Live action ====
- The Alec Holland incarnation of Swamp Thing appears in a self-titled film (1982), portrayed by Ray Wise and Dick Durock respectively.
- The Alec Holland incarnation of Swamp Thing appears in The Return of Swamp Thing (1989), with Dick Durock reprising the role and Ray Wise reappearing in a flashback via archive footage from the preceding film. This version of Swamp Thing is Holland's consciousness reconstituted through plant life.
- The documentary film The Mindscape of Alan Moore (2003) contains a psychedelic animation piece based on The Saga of the Swamp Thing (vol. 2) #29 ("Love and Death").
- On January 31, 2023, a self-titled Swamp Thing horror film was announced to be in development at New Line Cinema and DC Studios. The following day, The Hollywood Reporter confirmed that James Mangold was in early talks to write and direct the film after the releases of Indiana Jones and the Dial of Destiny and his Bob Dylan biopic A Complete Unknown.

==== Animated ====
- An unnamed, alternate universe incarnation of Swamp Thing makes a non-speaking cameo appearance in Justice League: Crisis on Two Earths (2010) as a minor member of the Crime Syndicate.
- The Alec Holland incarnation of Swamp Thing appears in the DC Animated Movie Universe films Justice League Dark and Justice League Dark: Apokolips War, voiced by Roger Cross. This version is a member of Justice League Dark.
- The Alec Holland incarnation of Swamp Thing appears in Batman and Harley Quinn, voiced by John DiMaggio.
- The Alec Holland incarnation of Swamp Thing appears in Teen Titans Go! To the Movies.
- The Alec Holland incarnation of Swamp Thing appears in Justice League: Crisis on Infinite Earths.

=== Video games ===
- The Alec Holland incarnation of Swamp Thing appears as a playable character in a self-titled video game based on the Swamp Thing animated series.
- The Alec Holland incarnation of Swamp Thing appears as a playable character in DC Universe Online, voiced by Chilimbwe Washington.
- The Alec Holland incarnation of Swamp Thing appears as a character summon in Scribblenauts Unmasked: A DC Comics Adventure.
- The Alec Holland incarnation of Swamp Thing appears as a playable character in Lego Batman 3: Beyond Gotham, voiced by JB Blanc.
- The Alec Holland incarnation of Swamp Thing appears as a playable character in Infinite Crisis, voiced by Michael Dorn.
- The Alec Holland incarnation of Swamp Thing appears as a playable character in Injustice 2, voiced by Fred Tatasciore.
- The Alec Holland incarnation of Swamp Thing appears as a playable character in Lego DC Super-Villains as part of the "Justice League Dark" DLC.

=== Miscellaneous ===
- Swamp Thing appears in Super Friends #28 (January 1980) as an enemy of the titular Super Friends.
- Swamp Thing appears in the Injustice: Gods Among Us prequel comic. He sides with Superman's Regime because of their efforts to prevent cataclysmic harm to the environment before being trapped in Hell amidst Trigon and Mister Mxyzptlk's battle.

== Awards ==
Over the years, the Swamp Thing series has been nominated for and won several awards. Len Wein won the 1972 Shazam Award for "Best Writer (Dramatic Division)" and Berni Wrightson won the Shazam Award for "Best Penciller (Dramatic Division)" that same year for their work on Swamp Thing. Wein and Wrightson also won the Shazam Award for "Best Individual Story (Dramatic)" in 1972 for "Dark Genesis" in Swamp Thing #1. The series won the Shazam Award for "Best Continuing Feature" in 1973.

Alan Moore won the 1985 and 1986 Jack Kirby Awards for "Best Writer" for Swamp Thing. Moore, John Totleben, and Steve Bissette won the 1985 Jack Kirby Award for "Best Single Issue" for Swamp Thing Annual #2. They also won the 1985, 1986, and 1987 Jack Kirby Awards for "Best Continuing Series" for Swamp Thing.
