= Swamp Thing (comic book) =

Comic book titles featuring the character the Swamp Thing

- Swamp Thing #1 (November 1972); Cover art by Bernie Wrightson and Gaspar Saladino

Publication information
- Publisher: DC Comics
- Schedule: (vol. 1): Bi-monthly (The Saga of the Swamp Thing vols. 2–6, The Swamp Thing): Monthly
- Format: Ongoing series
- Genre: Superhero, horror
- Publication date: List: (vol. 1) October–November 1972 – August–September 1976; (The Saga of the Swamp Thing) May 1982 – July 1985 (vol. 2) August 1985 – October 1996; (vol. 3) May 2000 – December 2001; (vol. 4) May 2004 – September 2006; (vol. 5) September 2011 – May 2015; (vol. 6) January 2016 – June 2016; (The Swamp Thing) March 2021 – August 2022
- No. of issues: List: (vol. 1): 24; (The Saga of the Swamp Thing): 38 plus one Annual (vol. 2): 133, plus six Annuals; (vol. 3): 20; (vol. 4): 29; (vol. 5): 42 (#1–40, plus #0 and 23.1), a Swamp Thing: Futures End one-shot and three Annuals; (vol. 6): 6; (The Swamp Thing): 16

Creative team
- Written by: List: (vol. 1) Len Wein (#1-13), David Michelinie (#14-18, 21-22), Gerry Conway (#19-20, 23-24); (The Saga of the Swamp Thing) Martin Pasko, Alan Moore (vol. 2) Alan Moore (#20-61, 63-64, Annual #2), Rick Veitch (#62, 65–76, 79–87, Annual #3), Doug Wheeler, Nancy A. Collins (#110-115, 117-125, 127-138, Annual #6-7), Grant Morrison (#140-143), Mark Millar (#144-171); (vol. 3) Brian K. Vaughan; (vol. 4) Andy Diggle, Joshua Dysart; (vol. 5) Scott Snyder, Charles Soule; (vol. 6) Len Wein; (The Swamp Thing) Ram V.
- Pencillers: List: (vol. 1) Bernie Wrightson, Nestor Redondo; (The Saga of the Swamp Thing) Tom Yeates, Fred Carrillo, Bo Hampton, Stephen Bissette; (vol. 2) Stephen Bissette, Stan Woch, Rick Veitch, Tom Mandrake, Pat Broderick, Mike Hoffman, Scot Eaton, Phil Hester; (vol. 3) Roger Petersen, Giuseppe Camuncoli; (vol. 4) Enrique Breccia, Richard Corben; (vol. 5) Yanick Paquette, Jesus Saiz; (vol. 6) Kelley Jones; (The Swamp Thing) Mike Perkins
- Inkers: List: (The Saga of the Swamp Thing) John Totleben; (vol. 2) John Totleben, Alfredo Alcala, Kim de Mulder
- Colorist: List: (The Saga of the Swamp Thing, vol. 2) Tatjana Wood (vol. 3) Alex Sinclair

The character of Swamp Thing has appeared in seven American comic book series to date, including several specials, and has crossed over into other DC Comics titles. The series found immense popularity upon its 1970s debut and during the mid-late 1980s under Alan Moore, Stephen Bissette, and John Totleben. These eras were met with high critical praise and numerous awards. However, over the years, the Swamp Thing comics have suffered from low sales, which have resulted in numerous series cancellations and revivals.

== First series ==
=== Len Wein ===
The first Swamp Thing series ran for 24 issues, from 1972 to 1976. Len Wein was the writer for the first 13 issues before David Michelinie and Gerry Conway finished up the series. Horror artist Berni Wrightson drew the first 10 issues of the series, while Nestor Redondo drew a further 13 issues, the last issue being drawn by Fred Carrillo. The Swamp Thing fought against evil as he sought the men who murdered his wife and caused his monstrous transformation, as well as searching for a means to transform himself back to his human form.

The Swamp Thing has since fought many villains, most notably the mad scientist Anton Arcane and his army of Un-Men. Also involved in the conflict was Matthew Cable, a federal agent who originally mistakenly believed Swamp Thing to be responsible for the deaths of Alec and Linda Holland.

Wein ended his run as writer by having the Swamp Thing reveal his identity to Matt Cable and ultimately avenging the death of his wife by killing Nathan Ellery. The full Wein 13-issue run was released in hardcover by DC in June 2009 as Roots of the Swamp Thing, volume 4 of the 9-volume book series the DC Comics Classics Library.

=== David Michelinie/Gerry Conway/David Anthony Kraft ===
As sales figures plummeted towards the end of the series, the writers attempted to revive interest by introducing fantasy creatures, sci-fi aliens, and even Alec Holland's brother, Edward (a plot point that was never referred to or even mentioned again by later writers), into the picture.

The appearance of Holland's brother toward the end of the series marked a series of plot developments, designed to provide the series with a happy ending, which generated much controversy. In Swamp Thing #23, Alec finally regains his humanity and while the creature was on the cover of the 24th and final issue of the series (albeit transforming into human), Holland appeared as human throughout the interior story. The cover illustration showed a yellow muscular creature, Thrudvang, beating up the Swamp Thing; the interior showed Holland imagining the Swamp Thing beating up Thrudvang, in similar positions but with roles reversed—the issue itself depicting Holland and his new love interest (and his brother's research assistant) running away from Thrudvang.

A battle between the Swamp Thing and Hawkman was promised for the next issue, but no such battle occurred until Swamp Thing (vol. 2) #58. The existing scripts and artwork from this unpublished issue were eventually reprinted in the trade paperback Swamp Thing: The Bronze Age Volume 2. In 2026, it was announced that the unreleased 25th issue of the series would be completed for the first time for the Dark Genesis Omnibus with Josef Rubinstein inking the surviving pencils, alongside pencilling and inking a page from the original script, with José Villarubia on colors.

During the short-lived revival of Challengers of the Unknown in issues #81-87, also by Gerry Conway, the Swamp Thing returned as Alec Holland who, without continually producing and self-medicating with the bio-restorative formula, reverted into the form of the Swamp Thing. Holland, along with the Challengers of the Unknown, encountered the supernatural being known as Deadman (though they were unaware of Deadman's presence), a fact that would confirm the post-Wein Swamp Thing stories existence in DC Universe continuity years later when Deadman and the Swamp Thing met again during Alan Moore's run as writer. The Swamp Thing also appeared with the Batman twice in The Brave and the Bold #122 and 176 and with Superman in DC Comics Presents #8. In the latter, by Steve Englehart, he tried in vain to stop Superman from committing what he perceived as genocide (using a compound developed by S.T.A.R. Labs) on 60 Solomon Grundys living in the sewers of Metropolis.

== Second series ==
=== Martin Pasko/Dan Mishkin ===
In an issue dated May 1982, DC Comics revived the Swamp Thing series to try to capitalize on the summer 1982 release of the Wes Craven film of the same name. The title, called The Saga of the Swamp Thing, featured in its first Annual the comic book adaptation of the Craven movie. Now written by Martin Pasko, the book loosely picked up after the Swamp Thing's appearances in Challengers of the Unknown #81-87, DC Comics Presents #8, and The Brave and the Bold #176, with the character wandering around the swamps of Louisiana as something of an urban legend that was feared by locals.

Martin Pasko's main arc depicted the Swamp Thing roaming the globe, trying to stop a young girl (and possible Nazi-affiliated Anti-Christ) named Karen Clancy from destroying the world. The series also featured back-up stories involving the Phantom Stranger by Mike W. Barr, which led to a collaboration between the Swamp Thing and the Stranger in a guest run by Dan Mishkin that featured a scientist who transformed himself into a silicon creature. The primary artist for the bulk of Pasko's run was Tom Yeates; towards the end of the run he was replaced with Stephen R. Bissette and John Totleben (who began by inking Yeates' pencils). Bissette and Totleben, who had known Yeates at The Kubert School, had been ghosting various pages for Yeates, and were given the assignment on Pasko's recommendation.

In issue #6, editor Len Wein declared, in response to a published letter, that Alec never had a brother and that every Swamp Thing series story after issue #21 of the original series never happened. The letter, however, questioned why the Swamp Thing had reverted, which had already been explained in the Challengers of the Unknown run. A later column pointed this out, so they said they would not deliberately contradict it, even though they would still go from the assumption that it never happened.

The arrival of Bissette and Totleben came as Pasko, who wrote the second Brave and the Bold team-up shortly before he began the series, resurrected plotlines from the original series. Abigail Arcane and Matt Cable were brought back and shown to be married, though this development had a darker side: Cable had been tortured via repeated electroshock treatments by his black-ops superiors over his decision to stop working for the government in order to marry Abigail. The electroshock treatments caused permanent brain damage for Matt, resulting in him being unable to work and, ironically, granting him psychic ability in the form of being able to create lifelike mental illusions. Pasko also resurrected Anton Arcane, now a grotesque half-human/half-insect cyborg with an army of insectoid Un-Men who ultimately cannibalized their creator after the Swamp Thing was forced to kill Arcane.

Pasko left the book with issue #19, which featured the (third) death of Arcane, the second of which, from Swamp Thing #10, was reprinted in The Saga of the Swamp Thing (vol. 2) #18. He would be replaced by British writer Alan Moore.

=== Alan Moore ===
The Saga of Swamp Thing #21 (Feb. 1984) is the debut of Alan Moore's work on Swamp Thing. Cover art by Thomas Yeates.

As Swamp Thing was heading for cancellation due to low sales, DC editorial agreed to give Alan Moore (at the time a relatively unknown writer in America whose previous work included several stories for 2000 AD, Warrior and Marvel UK) free rein to revamp the title and the character as he saw fit. Moore reconfigured the Swamp Thing's origin to make him a true monster as opposed to a human transformed into a monster. In his first issue, he swept aside the supporting cast Pasko had introduced in his year-and-a-half run as writer, and brought the Sunderland Corporation (a villainous group out to gain the secrets of Alec Holland's research) to the forefront, as they hunted down the Swamp Thing and "killed" him in a hail of bullets.

The Saga of the Swamp Thing (vol. 2) #21 (Feb. 1984), "The Anatomy Lesson", signaled a change in the character's mythos by having an obscure supervillain, the Floronic Man (Jason Woodrue), perform an autopsy on the Swamp Thing's body and discover it was only superficially human, its organs little more than crude, nonfunctional, vegetable-based imitations of their human counterparts, indicating that the Swamp Thing could never have been human. The Swamp Thing was not Alec Holland, but only believed it to be so: Holland had indeed died in the fire, and the swamp vegetation had absorbed his consciousness and memories and created a new sentient being that believed itself to be Alec Holland. The Swamp Thing would never be human again because he never was human to start with. Woodrue also concluded that, despite the autopsy, the Swamp Thing was still alive and in a deep coma due to the bullet wounds and imprisonment in cold-storage.

Moore would later reveal, in an attempt to connect the original one-off Swamp Thing story from House of Secrets to the main Swamp Thing canon, that there had been dozens, perhaps hundreds, of Swamp Things since the dawn of humanity, and that all versions of the creature were designated defenders of the Parliament of Trees, an elemental community also known as "the Green" that connects all plant life on Earth.

The Swamp Thing went catatonic due to the shock of discovering what he really was, after having killed Sunderland in a fit of rage and escaped deep into the Green. Woodrue went insane after attempting to connect to the Green through the Swamp Thing, and Abby had to revive the Swamp Thing in order to stop Woodrue after Woodrue killed an entire Louisiana town. Swamp Thing returned to the swamps of Louisiana, and encountered Etrigan the Demon, then gave a final burial for Holland's bones.

Matthew Cable, gravely hurt in the previous storyline, was revealed to have been possessed by Anton Arcane, and Abby unwittingly had an incestuous relationship with him. After a fight, Cable was thrown into a coma, and Abby's soul was sent to Hell. In Swamp Thing Annual #2, modeled on Dante's Inferno, the Swamp Thing followed Abigail, encountering classic DC characters such as Deadman, the Phantom Stranger, the Spectre, and Etrigan en route, and eventually rescued her.

The relationship between the Swamp Thing and Abby deepened, and in Swamp Thing (vol. 2) #34 ("Rites of Spring") the two confessed that they loved each other since they met, and "made love" through a hallucinogenic experience brought on when Abby ate a tuber produced by the Swamp Thing's body (this served as a segment in the film The Return of Swamp Thing, where the Swamp Thing produces a fruit and the ingestion of the fruit makes Abby to see the Swamp Thing as a handsome man, and then they have sex). The controversial relationship between a plant and a human would culminate in Abby being arrested later for breaking the laws of nature and conducting a sexual relationship with a nonhuman. Abby ultimately fled to Gotham City, leading to a story arc featuring the fourth encounter between the Swamp Thing and Batman. Before that, the "American Gothic" storyline introduced the character John Constantine (later to star in his own comic John Constantine, Hellblazer) in issues #37–50, where the Swamp Thing had to travel to several parts of America, encountering several archetypal horror monsters, including vampires (the same clan he fought in The Saga of the Swamp Thing (vol. 2) #3), a werewolf, and zombies, but modernized with relevance to current issues. Around this time, Moore had the Swamp Thing encounter Superman a second time, in DC Comics Presents #85. The storyline began with the Swamp Thing's old body being completely destroyed, and growing a new one. Constantine encourages the Swamp Thing to use the power for transportation, and the Swamp Thing learns to do so with increasing speed. The "American Gothic" storyline ended with a crossover with Crisis on Infinite Earths, where the Swamp Thing had to solve the battle between Good (Light) and Evil (Darkness). He also met the Parliament of Trees in issue #47, which was where Earth elementals like him lay to rest after they have walked the Earth, and it was here Moore solved the continuity problem of the first and second Swamp Thing: the first Swamp Thing, Alex Olsen, was now a part of the Parliament.

Although Abby was eventually released, Swamp Thing was ambushed by soldiers using a weapon designed by Lex Luthor. Luthor's weapon destroyed the Swamp Thing's connection with the Earth, whilst the Swamp Thing's body was destroyed by napalm. Unable to regrow a new Earthly body, the Swamp Thing was presumed dead. However, the Swamp Thing's consciousness had instead fled to outer space, in search of a planet that was amenable to his new psychic wavelength. In the first tale of the Swamp Thing's extraterrestrial activities ("My Blue Heaven", #56), the Swamp Thing came upon a planet colored entirely in shades of blue, and on which there was no intelligent life. In this particularly popular issue, the Swamp Thing populated this lonely blue planet with mindless plant replicas of Abby and other reminders of his lost Earth.

In issue #60, entitled "Loving the Alien", the Swamp Thing actually becomes the father of the numerous offspring of an alien cosmic entity after she "mates" with him against his will.

Moore's run included several references to obscure or forgotten comic characters (the Phantom Stranger, Cain and Abel, the Floronic Man), but none so prominent as in issue #32, when he broke with the serious and moody storyline for a single issue. In the story "Pog", Walt Kelly's funny animal comic character Pogo (created in 1943) and all of his woodland friends show up as costumed visitors from another planet, looking for an unspoiled world after their own utopia was overrun and destroyed by brutal monkeys.

Moore began a trend (continued by Neil Gaiman, among others) of mining the DC Universe's vast collection of minor supernatural characters to create a mythic atmosphere. Characters spun off from Moore's series gave rise to DC's Vertigo comic book line, notably The Sandman, John Constantine, Hellblazer, and The Books of Magic; Vertigo titles were written with adults in mind and often contained material unsuitable for children. The Saga of the Swamp Thing was the first mainstream comic book series to completely abandon the Comics Code Authority (CCA); after the CCA denied issue #29 the seal of approval, DC created an imprint to publish the series under and no longer submitted issues of The Saga of the Swamp Thing to the CCA for approval.

=== Rick Veitch ===
Moore's final issue, #64, was dated September 1987. At that point, regular penciller Rick Veitch began scripting the series, continuing the story in a roughly similar vein for 24 more issues. Shortly after issue #65, Swamp Thing Annual #3 was produced, this time focusing on DC's primate characters, such as Congorilla, Sam Simeon, and Gorilla Grodd. The Batman guest-starred in issue #66. Hellblazer also began soon after Swamp Thing (vol. 2) #67, and the two series had storylines which crossover to each other during Hellblazer's first year under writer Jamie Delano. In Veitch's Swamp Thing stories, the Parliament of Trees, having believed the Swamp Thing dead, grew a Sprout to replace him. Unwilling to sacrifice an innocent life, he convinced them that he would take the Sprout as his own child, and eventually impregnated Abby (now his wife) with it by possessing John Constantine. After the completion of this storyline, the Swamp Thing sought to resolve his need for vengeance against those who had "killed" him during his showdown in Gotham City, culminating in a showdown with Lex Luthor (and Superman) in Swamp Thing (vol. 2) #79 and a confrontation with the Batman in Swamp Thing Annual #4.

It was during this time that the Swamp Thing first encountered Black Orchid in Neil Gaiman and Dave McKean's three-part graphic novel. Later, during the Invasion! crossover event, the Swamp Thing was thrown into the past, and traveled through time trying to return to the present. The story was published in Swamp Thing (vol. 2) #80–87. One issue of this storyline [#84] focused upon the Swamp Thing's regular supporting cast. In this issue, Matthew Cable died during his coma and arrived in the land of the Dreaming, where he encountered Morpheus and Eve. Cable would later be written into The Sandman by Neil Gaiman as Matthew the Raven.

Veitch's term ended in a widely publicized creative dispute, when DC refused to publish issue #88 because of the use of Jesus as a character despite having previously approved the script, in which the Swamp Thing is revealed to be the cupbearer who offers Jesus water when he calls for it from the cross. The move was said to be made due to controversies then arising from the Martin Scorsese film The Last Temptation of Christ. Artist Michael Zulli had already partially completed the art. The move disgusted Veitch and he immediately resigned from writing. Neil Gaiman and Jamie Delano, who were originally slated to be the next writers, sympathetically declined to take up the helm. Gaiman, however, was cooperative enough with the editorial staff to write Swamp Thing Annual #5, featuring Brother Power the Geek, to fill the series hiatus, which led into the run of the new Swamp Thing writer, Doug Wheeler. The Annual was reprinted in Neil Gaiman's Midnight Days.

In 2025, during New York Comic Con, it was announced that Veitch's final four issues of Swamp Thing would be published in 2026 under DC's Black Label imprint. The mini-series will be titled Swamp Thing 1989 and run as #1-4, but the cover images will continue the numbering of where Veitch left off, #88-91.

=== Doug Wheeler ===
From September 1989 to July 1991, Doug Wheeler wrote issues #88–109. Wheeler quickly wrapped up Veitch's time travel arc and oversaw the birth of Abby and the Swamp Thing's daughter Tefé Holland. The remaining tenure of Wheeler's run focused upon a longstanding war between the Parliament of Trees and the Gray, a fungus-themed elemental realm in opposition to the Parliament of Trees.

Wheeler's run was drawn by Pat Broderick and Mike Hoffman. Broderick's work had a more traditional, adventure-comics look than previous artists on the series. John Totleben continued to contribute painted covers up to issue #100. After issue #101, Alfredo Alcala departed his role as longtime inker as he transitioned from comics to animation. The art of Mike Hoffman lacked the atmospheric detail that had characterized the first 100 issues. Due to the backlash among creators including planned Swamp Thing writers Jamie Delano and Neil Gaiman, DC relied upon newcomer artists and writers whose careers in comics never took off. This poorly received run eventually caused DC to replace Hoffman and Wheeler. Swamp Thing received a large multimedia push during the transition from Wheeler to Collins, receiving an live action series on USA Network and a animated series from Dic. Bill Jaaska was used on a few issues including Annual #6 during the transition.

=== Nancy A. Collins ===
Seeking to revive interest in the series, DC brought horror writer Nancy A. Collins on board to write the series, first with Swamp Thing Annual #6 before moving on to write Swamp Thing #110–138.

Collins dramatically overhauled the series, restoring the pre-Alan Moore tone of the series as well as incorporating a new set of supporting cast members into the book. Collins resurrected Anton Arcane, along with the Sunderland Corporation, as foils for the Swamp Thing. Collins also moved the series, which had focused on the Swamp Thing's time travel adventures and explorations into other-dimensional realms, back to normal society by having the Swamp Thing and Abby set up shop in southern Louisiana and attempt to live a normal life with friends and family, culminating in the introduction of the elemental babysitter Lady Jane into the supporting cast. It was during her run that DC officially launched the Vertigo imprint and Swamp Thing #129 was the first issue to carry the Vertigo logo on the cover. Collins wrapped up her run by having the Swamp Thing promise Abby that he will never leave her side. He then breaks his promise and creates a secret double to stay and protect Abby as he goes into the Green during an environmental crisis. Abby feels betrayed and leaves a despondent Swamp Thing behind. He retreats into the Green, and when Lady Jane reaches out to him, it sparks into a love affair. Arcane returns and arranges an abduction of Abby to force Tefe to use her powers to grow him a healthy body. The ongoing stress from constant attacks and dealing with Tefe's powers leads to Abby rejecting Tefe and eventually leaving town with her new boyfriend. Fearing for Tefe's safety, Lady Jane betrays the Swamp Thing and kidnaps Tefe into the Green, so that she can be trained by the Parliament of Trees.

Swamp Thing Annual #7, published around this time, was the final annual issue as part of the Vertigo crossover event "The Children's Crusade". Collins also wrote a Swamp Thing story for the anthology one-shot Vertigo Jam. Shortly after Collins' departure, Black Orchid series writer Dick Foreman wrote a two-part crossover between the two titles, Black Orchid #5 and Swamp Thing #139.

=== Grant Morrison ===
With issue #140 (March 1994), the title was handed over to Grant Morrison for a four-issue arc. As Collins had destroyed the status quo of the series, Morrison sought to shake the book up with a four-part storyline which had the Swamp Thing plunged into a nightmarish dream world scenario, where he was split into two separate beings: Alec Holland and the Swamp Thing, which was now a mindless being of pure destruction.

=== Mark Millar ===
Mark Millar then took over from Morrison with issue #144, and launched what was initially conceived as an ambitious 25-part storyline where the Swamp Thing would be forced to go upon a series of "trials" against rival elemental forces. This led to a series of lengthy storylines by Millar as the Swamp Thing fought rival elemental beings and in the process, became champions of the five main Elemental Parliaments: Trees, Stone, Waves, Vapor and Flames. It was during this time that the Swamp Thing also encountered the Batman's enemy Killer Croc, in a failed attempt to resolve the character's ongoing storyline in 1995's Batman #521–522, Swamp Thing (vol. 2) #159-160, and The Batman Chronicles #3.

The series was later cancelled. Explanations for the cancellation vary, from low sales to Millar himself having become bored with the series. Despite this, Millar decided to leave the title which, in turn, caused DC to cancel the series.

Millar was given the job to wrap up the series, which would end with Swamp Thing (vol. 2) #171. John Totleben would return to illustrate the covers for issues #160–171.

Millar's final arc for the series had the Swamp Thing, due to his success in beating the other Elemental Parliament Champions, become godlike and unapproachable by mortals, even as his estranged wife Abby returned to try to reconcile with him. With help from John Constantine, Abby sought to keep the Swamp Thing from destroying humanity so that the Parliament Elementals could claim control over Earth. In the end, the Swamp Thing unites all of the Elemental Parliaments into one collective hive mind with him in control of it. Achieving a global sense of consciousness, the Swamp Thing sees through the worldview of every living thing upon the planet and find the good and the potential in even his worst enemy. This is shown most notably with the final resurrection of Anton Arcane who, during his most recent stay in Hell, befriended a priest that was unfairly condemned to Hell and in the process renounced evil and became a born-again Christian.

The Swamp Thing thus spares humanity and becomes a Planetary Elemental, representing Earth itself, and joins the Parliament of Worlds, which is made up of all the other "enlightened worlds" (the only others actually named were Mars, who greeted the Swamp Thing into their number, and Oa; due to its destruction some time before [in Green Lantern #0], Mars lamented Oa could not witness Earth's induction). This was the most significant change made to the character since Moore's reinterpretation, though in the Michael Zulli story "Look Away" (found within the 2000 special issue Swamp Thing Vertigo Secret Files and Origins #1) the Swamp Thing ultimately returns to normal and renounces his status as a Planetary Elemental, due to his belief that he was more effective a figure as a normal elemental being living in the swamp.

After being overlooked for inclusion in countless DC Universe crossovers since Invasion!, the Swamp Thing reappeared in the coda for the DC Universe crossover event The Final Night, appearing at Hal Jordan's funeral alongside John Constantine. In 1997, the Swamp Thing was written into Aquaman (vol. 5) #32–33 by Peter David and attended the funeral for the ghost of Jim Corrigan in The Spectre (vol. 3) #62 by John Ostrander, which was the final issue of that series.

Early 1998 saw the production of Jon J. Muth's Vertigo graphic novel Swamp Thing: Roots. The Sandman spin-off The Dreaming #22–24 written by Caitlín R. Kiernan saw Matthew Cable's return to human form, his uneasy reunion and final departure from his ex-wife Abby (now married to the Swamp Thing) and Cable's restoration to his dream raven form. Matthew the Raven died in The Dreaming story "Foxes and Hounds" in issues #42–43, a fact that was later touched upon by the 2000 special issue Swamp Thing Vertigo Secret Files and Origins #1. The final week of 1999 saw the Swamp Thing teaming up with other Vertigo heroes from the DC Universe in the one-shot special Totems.

== Third series ==
=== Brian K. Vaughan ===
Written by Brian K. Vaughan and drawn by Roger Petersen (issues #1 – #11) and Giuseppe Camuncoli (issues #12 – #20) in 2001, the third series focused on the daughter of the Swamp Thing, Tefé Holland. Even though she was chronologically 11–12, the series had Tefe aged into the body of an 18-year-old with a mindwipe to try to control her darker impulses, brought about by her exposure to the Parliament of Trees. Due to the circumstances under which she was conceived (the Swamp Thing, possessing John Constantine, was not aware he was given a blood transfusion by a demon), she held power over both plants and flesh.

== Fourth series ==
=== Andy Diggle / Will Pfeifer ===
The fourth series began in 2004, with rotating writers of Andy Diggle (#1–6), Will Pfeifer (#7–8) and Joshua Dysart (#9–29). In this latest series, the Swamp Thing is reverted to his plant-based Earth elemental status after the first storyline, and he attempts to live an "eventless" life in the Louisiana swamps. Tefé, likewise, is rendered powerless and mortal.

=== Joshua Dysart ===
Meanwhile, a rogue consciousness, calling itself the Holland Mind, was living in the Green. As of issue #15, botany professor Jordan Schiller, an influential man from Alec Holland's past, has been summoned to the swamp by strange visions and memories, apparently manipulated by this rogue consciousness. The full purpose for this manipulation was revealed in issues #21–24. In sacrificing his power, the Swamp Thing lost much of his Alec Holland personality. Now he is restored to his proper station and power and has resumed his romantic relationship with Abby, as of issue #25. Beginning with issue #21 onward, Eric Powell provided covers for the series.

The Floronic Man returned in #27–29, his mind splintered in the aftermath of Infinite Crisis. Issue #29 was the final issue of the fourth volume, which had been cancelled due to low sales numbers, despite fan-supported efforts to save the series.

The Dysart series deals with the aftermath of Hurricane Katrina in the last 12 issues of the series. Most notable is the fact that real estate tycoons had been wanting to develop the Lower Ninth Ward of New Orleans.

== Fifth series ==
=== Scott Snyder ===
The Swamp Thing was relaunched as an ongoing series in 2011 as part of The New 52, a company wide relaunch by DC comics. It was written by Scott Snyder and drawn by Yanick Paquette. Taking off from the end of Brightest Day, the series follows a resurrected Alec Holland who wants to put the memories of the Swamp Thing behind him. He is approached first by an earlier incarnation of the Swamp Thing, representing the Parliament of Trees. This Swamp Thing informs Holland that he is a unique individual who would have become a legendary warrior for the Parliament and the Green, the essence of all plant life. When Holland died, the Parliament created a creature which thought it was him as a substitute. Holland rebuffs the creature's entreaties that he assume the mantle of the Swamp Thing. Next, he is approached by Abigail Arcane, the former lover of the Swamp Thing. She enlists him to help save her half-brother William Arcane, before he becomes the champion of the Rot, the force of decay, once known as the Swamp Thing's archenemy, Anton Arcane. While traveling cross-country, Holland and Arcane find themselves increasingly attracted to each other. After confronting William, who has already become a servant of the Rot, Abigail is captured and taken away. At the same time, the Parliament of Trees comes under attack and is about to be destroyed. Realizing his mistake, Holland accepts the mantle of the Swamp Thing as the only way to save Abigail and prevent the Rot from triumphing.

Issues #8 and 9 were drawn by Yanick Paquette and Marco Rudy. Issue #10 was drawn by Francesco Francavilla, and #11 by Marco Rudy. Issue #12, which featured Animal Man, was a collaborative effort between Scott Snyder, Jeff Lemire, Marco Rudy, Dan Green, and Andy Owens. Issue #13 subsequently returned to Yanick Paquette drawing.

=== Charles Soule ===
After the conclusion of Scott Snyder's tenure on the series, Charles Soule took over with issue #19. His run on the series has the Swamp Thing fighting with Jason Woodrue, now known as the Seeder in the new continuity, who gained power over the Green after saving Alec Holland in the past. The Seeder eventually becomes the new Avatar of the Green after the Swamp Thing chooses not to kill him. Holland manages to escape from the Green by becoming one of the Parliament of Trees and grabbing Woodrue to tap into the power of the Avatar. He manages to convince the Parliament that he is better by making all plant life, including the algae in the oceans and seas, to become hyperactive and produce massive amounts of oxygen, which makes all other beings feel lazier. The Parliament agrees and makes him the Avatar once more.

== Sixth series ==
=== Len Wein ===
From March to August 2016, a six-issue miniseries was published, written by Swamp Thing co-creator Len Wein and pencilled by Kelley Jones.

== Seventh series ==
=== Ram V ===
The new series, retitled as The Swamp Thing, started March 2021 and being written by Ram V and pencilled by Mike Perkins. A new character Levi Kamei takes over the role as the new Avatar of the Green. The series was planned to be a ten-issue miniseries until it was extended to 16 issues.

== Awards and nominations ==
=== Comics Buyer's Guide Fan Awards ===
- Favorite Comic Book Story – Swamp Thing #53 (1986, ranked #6)
- Favorite Comic Book – Swamp Thing (1986, ranked #1)
- Favorite Character – Swamp Thing (1986, ranked #6)

=== Eisner Awards ===
- Best Single Issue – Swamp Thing #75, by Rick Veitch (1989, nominated)
- Best Single Issue or Story – Swamp Thing #113, by Nancy A. Collins, Tom Yeates, and Shepherd Hendrix (1992, nominated)
- Best Editor – Stuart Moore, Swamp Thing, The Invisibles, Preacher (1996, tie)
- Best Cover Artist – Phil Hale, Swamp Thing, Swamp Thing: Vertigo Secret Files and Origins #1, Flinch #11 (2001, nominated)

=== Harvey Awards ===
- Best Letterer – John Costanza, for Swamp Thing (1988, nominated)
- Best Continuing or Limited Series – Swamp Thing, by Rick Veitch and Alfredo Alcala (1988, nominated)
- Best Writer – Rick Veitch, for Swamp Thing (1989, nominated)
- Best Colorist – Tatjana Wood, for Swamp Thing (1989, nominated)

=== Jack Kirby Awards ===
- Best Single Issue – Swamp Thing #32, by Alan Moore and Shawn McManus (1985, nominated)
- Best Single Issue – Swamp Thing #34, by Alan Moore, Stephen Bissette, and John Totleben (1985, nominated)
- Best Single Issue – Swamp Thing Annual #2, by Alan Moore, Stephen Bissette, and John Totleben (1985)
- Best Continuing Series – Swamp Thing, by Alan Moore, Stephen Bissette, and John Totleben (1985)
- Best Writer – Alan Moore, for Swamp Thing (1985)
- Best Art Team – Stephen Bissette and John Totleben, for Swamp Thing (1985)
- Best Cover – Swamp Thing #34, by Stephen Bissette and John Totleben (1985)
- Best Single Issue – Swamp Thing #43, by Alan Moore and Stan Woch (1986, nominated)
- Best Continuing Series – Swamp Thing, by Alan Moore, Stephen Bissette, and John Totleben (1986)
- Best Writer – Alan Moore, for Swamp Thing (1986)
- Best Writer/Artist – Alan Moore and Stephen Bissette, for Swamp Thing (1986, nominated)
- Best Art Team – Stephen Bissette and John Totleben, for Swamp Thing (1986, nominated)
- Best Continuing Series – Swamp Thing, by Alan Moore, Stephen Bissette, and John Totleben (1987)
- Best Writer – Alan Moore, for Swamp Thing (1986, nominated)
- Best Art Team – Stephen Bissette and John Totleben, for Swamp Thing (1987, nominated)

=== Shazam Awards ===
- Best Individual Story (Dramatic Division) – "Dark Genesis", by Len Wein and Bernie Wrightson, from Swamp Thing #1 (1972)
- Best Writer (Dramatic Division) – Len Wein, for Swamp Thing (1972)
- Best Penciller (Dramatic Division) – Bernie Wrightson, for Swamp Thing (1972)
- Best Continuing Feature – Swamp Thing (1973)
- Best Individual Story (Dramatic Division) – "A Clockwork Horror", by Len Wein and Bernie Wrightson, from Swamp Thing #6 (1973, nominated)
- Best Writer (Dramatic Division) – Len Wein, for Swamp Thing (1973, nominated)
- Best Penciller (Dramatic Division) – Bernie Wrightson, for Swamp Thing (1973)
- Best Inker (Dramatic Division) – Bernie Wrightson, for Swamp Thing (1973, nominated)

== Publication ==
=== Series writers ===
==== First series ====
- House of Secrets #92 and #1–13: Len Wein
- #14–18, 21–22: David Michelinie
- #19–20, 23: Gerry Conway
- #24: Gerry Conway/David Anthony Kraft

==== Second series ====
- Annual #1 (non-continuity): Bruce Jones, based on Wes Craven's screenplay. The Swamp Thing later makes reference to having seen the movie and hating it.
- #1–13, 16–19: Martin Pasko
- #14–15: Dan Mishkin
- #20–58, 60–61, 63–64, Annual #2: Alan Moore
- #59: Stephen Bissette, John Totleben, Alan Moore, Rick Veitch
- #62, Annual #3, 65–76, 79–87: Rick Veitch
- #77: Jamie Delano
- #78, Annual #4: Stephen Bissette
- Annual #5 (reprinted in Neil Gaiman's Midnight Days): Neil Gaiman
- #88–100, 102–109: Doug Wheeler
- #101: Andrew Helfer
- Annual #6, #110–115, 117–125, 127–138, Annual #7: Nancy A. Collins
- #116, 126, 139: Dick Foreman
- #140–143: Grant Morrison
- #144–171: Mark Millar
- Swamp Thing—Roots: Jon J. Muth (one-shot)

==== Third series ====
- #1–20: Brian K. Vaughan
- Swamp Thing Vertigo Secret Files and Origins #1: Brian K. Vaughan, Michael Zulli, Alisa Kwitney
- Winter's Edge III: Brian K. Vaughan

==== Fourth series ====
- #1–6: Andy Diggle
- #7–8: Will Pfeifer
- #9–29: Joshua Dysart

==== Brightest Day Aftermath: The Search for the Swamp Thing ====
- #1–3: Jonathan Vankin

==== Fifth series ====
- #1–18, Annual (vol. 2) #1: Scott Snyder
- #19–40, Annual (vol. 2) #2–3, #23.1: Anton Arcane: Charles Soule

==== Sixth Series ====
- #1-6: Len Wein

==== DC Infinite Frontier ====
- Future State: Swamp Thing #1-2: Ram V
- The Swamp Thing #1-16: Ram V

==== Guest appearances ====
- The Brave and the Bold #122: Bob Haney (between Swamp Thing #18–19)
- Challengers of the Unknown #81–87 (#81, bits only/#82, flashback only): Gerry Conway
- DC Comics Presents #8: Steve Englehart
- The Brave and the Bold #176: Martin Pasko
- DC Comics Presents #85: Alan Moore (between (vol. 2) #39–40)
- Crisis on Infinite Earths #4: Marv Wolfman (between Swamp Thing (vol. 2) #43–44)
- Crisis on Infinite Earths #5: Marv Wolfman (simultaneous with pp. 8–10 of Swamp Thing (vol. 2) #46)
- Legends of the DC Universe—Crisis on Infinite Earths: "The Untold Story": Marv Wolfman (between Crisis #5 and Swamp Thing (vol. 2) #46)
- Crisis on Infinite Earths #10: Marv Wolfman
- DC Challenge #11: Marv Wolfman, Cary Bates (between Swamp Thing (vol. 2) #50–51) (one-panel cameo)
- Martian Manhunter #11: John Ostrander (between Swamp Thing (vol. 2) #56–57) (October 1999)
- Infinity, Inc. #46: Roy Thomas, Dann Thomas (between Swamp Thing (vol. 2) #69–70)
- Millennium #8: Steve Englehart (between Swamp Thing (vol. 2) #69–70)
- Captain Atom #16–17: Cary Bates, Greg Weisman (between Swamp Thing (vol. 2) #74–75)
- Hellblazer #9–10: Jamie Delano (surrounding Swamp Thing (vol. 2) #76)
- Black Orchid (vol. 1) #3: Neil Gaiman (between Swamp Thing Annual #4 and Swamp Thing (vol. 2) #79)
- Firestorm, the Nuclear Man #90–93: John Ostrander, Tom Mandrake (between Swamp Thing (vol. 2) #90–91)
- Ambush Bug Nothing Special one-shot: Keith Giffen (between Swamp Thing (vol. 2) #117–118; continuity questionable)
- New Titans Annual, Bloodlines: Outbreak #9: Paul Witcover and Elizabeth Hand (between Swamp Thing (vol. 2) #126–127)
- Hellblazer #63: Garth Ennis (between Swamp Thing (vol. 2) #126–127)
- Black Orchid (vol. 2) #5: Dick Foreman (between Swamp Thing (vol. 2) #138–139)
- Vertigo Jam #1: Nancy A. Collins (between Swamp Thing (vol. 2) #139–140)
- Guy Gardner: Warrior #29: Beau Smith (between Swamp Thing (vol. 2) #150–151)
- Batman #521–522: Doug Moench (between Swamp Thing (vol. 2) #159–160)
- Underworld Unleashed: Abyss - Hell's Sentinel #1: Scott Peterson (between Swamp Thing (vol. 2) #162–163)
- Guy Gardner, Warrior #39: Beau Smith (between Swamp Thing (vol. 2) #163–164)
- Green Lantern (vol. 3) #81: Ron Marz
- Aquaman (vol. 5) #32–33: Peter David
- The Spectre (vol. 3) #62: John Ostrander
- V2K – Totems #1: Tom Peyer
- Hellblazer #184–185, 189, 192–193, 200, 215: Mike Carey
- Infinite Crisis #6: Geoff Johns
- JLA: The Nail (as Alec Holland) #3: Alan Davis (Elseworlds)
- JLA: Created Equal #1: Fabian Nicieza (Elseworlds)
- The House of Mystery Preview (published in Fables #72 and Jack of Fables)
- Brightest Day #23–24: Geoff Johns
- Animal Man (vol. 2) #12: Jeff Lemire
- Aquaman (vol. 7) #31: Jeff Parker
- Wonder Woman (vol. 4) #36: Meredith Finch
- Batman (vol. 3) #23: "The Brave and the Mold!" by Tom King

=== Collected editions ===
Swamp Thing: Earth to Earth paperback cover, copyright DC Comics

Swamp Thing has so far been collected in the following collections published by Vertigo and DC Comics:

- 1970s material
  - Dark Genesis, House of Secrets #92 and 1st series #1–10 (paperback: ISBN 1-56389-044-5) (also available as Secret of the Swamp Thing, published under the DC imprint in manga digest size ISBN 1-4012-0798-7; ISBN 978-1-4012-0798-4)
  - Roots of the Swamp Thing, House of Secrets #92 and 1st series #1–13 (hardcover: ISBN 1-40122-236-6) (paperback: ISBN 978-1-4012-3287-0)
  - Swamp Thing: The Bronze Age Omnibus HC, House of Secrets #92, 1st series #1–24, 2nd series #1–19, and Saga of The Swamp Thing Annual #1 (hardcover: ISBN 9781401273781)
  - Swamp Thing: The Bronze Age Vol. 1, House of Secrets #92, 1st series #1–13 (paperback ISBN 978-1401284404)
  - Swamp Thing: The Bronze Age Vol. 2, 1st series #14-24, The Brave and the Bold #122 and #176, DC Comics Presents #8, and Challengers of the Unknown #81-87 (paperback ISBN 978-1401294229)
- 1980s material
  - Swamp Thing: The Bronze Age Vol. 3, 2nd series #1-19 and Annual #1 (paperback: ISBN 978-1779507167)
  - Saga of the Swamp Thing, 2nd series #20–27 (paperback: ISBN 0-930289-22-6)
  - Love and Death, 2nd series #28–34 and Annual #2 (2011 paperback: ISBN 0-930289-54-4)
  - The Curse, 2nd series #35–42 (paperback: ISBN 1-56389-697-4)
  - A Murder of Crows, 2nd series #43–50 (paperback: ISBN 1-56389-719-9)
  - Earth to Earth, 2nd series #51–56 (paperback: ISBN 1-56389-804-7)
  - Reunion, 2nd series #57–64 (paperback: ISBN 1-56389-975-2)
  - Absolute Swamp Thing by Alan Moore, Vol. 1, 2nd series #20–34 and Annual #2 (2020 hardcover: ISBN 978-1779506955)
  - Absolute Swamp Thing by Alan Moore, Vol. 2, 2nd series #34–50 (2020 hardcover: ISBN 978-1779502827)
  - Absolute Swamp Thing by Alan Moore, Vol. 3, 2nd series #51–64 and DC Comics Presents #85 (2022 hardcover: ISBN 978-1779512192)
  - Regenesis, 2nd series #65–70 (paperback: ISBN 1-4012-0267-5)
  - Spontaneous Generation, 2nd series #71–76 (paperback: ISBN 1-4012-0793-6)
  - Infernal Triangles, 2nd series #77–81 and Annual #3 (paperback: ISBN 1-4012-1008-2)
  - Swamp Thing by Nancy A. Collins Omnibus, 2nd series #110-139 and Annual #6-7 (hardcover: ISBN 978-1401297091)
  - The Root of All Evil, 2nd series #140–150 (paperback: ISBN 1-4012-5241-9)
  - Darker Genesis, 2nd series #151–160 (paperback: ISBN 1-4012-5828-X)
  - Trial By Fire, 2nd series #161–171 (paperback: ISBN 1-4012-6337-2)
  - The Swamp Thing by Mark Millar and Phil Hester Omnibus, 2nd series #140-171 (hardcover: ISBN 1779528078)
- 2000s material
  - Swamp Thing by Brian K. Vaughan Vol. 1, 3rd series #1–9 and material from Vertigo: Winter's Edge #3 and Vertigo Secret Files & Origins: Swamp Thing #1 (paperback: ISBN 1-4012-4304-5)
  - Swamp Thing by Brian K. Vaughan Vol. 2, 3rd series #10–20 and material from Vertigo Secret Files & Origins: Swamp Thing #1 (paperback: ISBN 1-4012-4598-6)
  - Bad Seed, 4th series #1–6 (paperback: ISBN 1-4012-0421-X)
  - Love in Vain, 4th series #9–14 (paperback: ISBN 1-4012-0493-7)
  - Healing the Breach, 4th series #15–20 (paperback: ISBN 1-4012-0934-3)
- The New 52 series
  - Vol. 1: Raise Them Bones, 5th series #1–7 (paperback: ISBN 1-4012-3462-3)
  - Vol. 2: Family Tree, 5th series #8–11, 0 and Annual 2nd series #1 (paperback: ISBN 1-4012-3843-2)
  - Vol. 3: Rotworld: The Green Kingdom, 5th series #12–18; Animal Man #12, 17 (paperback: ISBN 978-1401242640)
  - Vol. 4: Seeder, 5th series #19–23, 23.1 (paperback: ISBN 978-1401246396)
  - Vol. 5: The Killing Field , 5th series #24–27 and Annual 2nd series #2 (paperback: ISBN 978-1401250522)
  - Vol. 6: The Sureen, 5th series #28–34; Aquaman (vol. 7) #31 (paperback: ISBN 978-1401254902)
  - Vol. 7: Season's End, 5th series #35–40, Annual 2nd series #3 and Swamp Thing: Futures End #1 (paperback: ISBN 978-1401257705)
  - Swamp Thing by Scott Snyder Deluxe Edition, 5th series #0–18 and Annual 2nd series #1; Animal Man #12, 17 (hardcover: ISBN 978-1401258702)
  - Swamp Thing: Protector of the Green, 5th series #1-11 (paperback: ISBN 978-1401290986)
  - Swamp Thing: The New 52 Omnibus, 5th series #0-40, 23.1; Swamp Thing Annual #1-3; Swamp Thing: Futures End #1; Animal Man #12, 17; and Aquaman #31. (hardcover: ISBN 978-1779508140)
- 2016 miniseries
  - Swamp Thing: The Dead Don't Sleep, miniseries #1–6 (paperback: ISBN 9781401270018)

The entire Alan Moore run (save his first issue, Swamp Thing #20, which was not reprinted until 2009) from #21-64 was first collected in the U.K. in the late 1980s as a series of black and white trade paperbacks. Because DC had been reluctant to reprint the complete Moore run, these trades became highly popular amongst fans of the series, a popularity which was further fueled by them not being distributed in the U.S. Release of hardcover reprints began in 2009, with the first volume including Swamp Thing #20 for the first time.
