= Swamp Thing (video game) =

1992 video game

- North American NES version cover art
- Developers: Imagineering (NES); Equilibrium (GB)
- Publisher: Toy Headquarters
- Designers: Barry Marx (NES); Dan Kitchen (NES); David Lubar (NES); Christian Dana Perry (GB); Curtis Norris (GB); Timothy H. Mensch (GB)
- Composers: Mark Van Hecke (NES); Ed Bogas (Game Boy)
- Platforms: NES; Game Boy
- Release: December 1992
- Genre: Platform
- Mode: Single-player

Swamp Thing is a platform video game for the NES and Game Boy. Based on the animated series of the same name, of the DC Comics superhero character Swamp Thing. It was published by THQ and released in December 1992.

A Swamp Thing title was also in development by Microsmiths for the Sega Mega Drive/Genesis but was canceled. It would have been published by NuVision Entertainment.

== Gameplay ==
The NES version of Swamp Thing borrows the game engine from The Simpsons: Bart vs. the Space Mutants. Its introduction features the origin story of Swamp Thing and as depicted in the 1991 animated series. The player takes the role of the title character battling foes throughout the Louisiana swamps and other locations in a side-scrolling format. Swamp Thing's attack methods include punching and firing "sludge balls" which are acquired throughout the game. The player must venture through various stages, which include a graveyard, chemical factory, toxic dump, and finally, Arcane's lab. Bosses include Arcane's Un-Men, Dr. Deemo, Weedkiller, Skinman, and finally, Arcane himself.

In Game Boy's Swamp Thing, stages include the Arctic, the desert, and contaminated rainforests. Swamp Thing also uses tools like camouflage and thorn skin, and he must recycle scattered garbage in order to score points and gain additional powers.

== Reception ==
Reception

Aggregate score
Aggregator	Score
GameRankings	35.50% (Game Boy)

Review scores
Publication	Score
AllGame	2/5 (NES)
Electronic Gaming Monthly	3.25/10 (NES) (Note: The Electronic Gaming Monthly review was by four authors, three of whom gave the game a 3/10 and one a 4/10.)
GamePro	3.75/5 (Game Boy) (Note: GamePro gave the Game Boy version two 4/5 scores for graphics and fun factor and two 3.5/5 scores for sound and control.)
Nintendo Power	2.5/5 (Game Boy) (Note: Nintendo Power gave the Game Boy version a 2.8/5 score for graphics and sound, a 2.3/5 score for play control, 2.4/5 for challenge, and 2.5/5 for theme and fun.)
Total!	21% (Game Boy)

Aside from marginal graphics, the NES Swamp Thing has received average to generally negative reviews for its high difficulty, poor music, and dull gameplay. While perhaps faring better than its NES counterpart, the Game Boy version of Swamp Thing was not met with high praise either, getting a 2.5/5 score from Nintendo Power.
