= American Freak =

American Freak: A Tale of the Un-Men
- Cover for American Freak #1

Publication information
- Publisher: Vertigo
- Schedule: Monthly
- Format: Limited series
- Publication date: February – June 1994
- No. of issues: 5
- Main character: Damien Kane

Creative team
- Created by: Len Wein and Berni Wrightson
- Written by: Dave Louapre
- Artist: Vince Locke
- Letterer: Clem Robins
- Colorist: Chris Chuckry
- Editor(s): Karen Berger; Alisa Kwitney (co-editor)

American Freak: A Tale of the Un-Men is a five-issue limited series comic book published by DC Comics under its Vertigo imprint. It was written by Dave Louapre and illustrated by Vince Locke and ran from February to June 1994.

== Plot ==
American Freak focused on a completely new set of characters of the Un-Men mythos created by Len Wein and Berni Wrightson, which were described as the offspring of the original Arcane Un-Men.

The plot of American Freak revolves around the second-generation son of two of these "horribly disfigured creatures", a 23-year-old man named Damien Kane. Per this miniseries, the Army conducted painful, inhumane experiments on the captive Un-Men, toward the goal of "mating" them and then producing a "serum" to eliminate deformity in the offspring (the military application of all this is not made clear). The serum proved unstable and all the offspring except for Damien Kane died. Kane developed normally until he turned 23 years of age, at which time (the beginning of this miniseries) he began to horribly mutate. The story follows Kane's painful transformation into a freak, and his escape (with the assistance of a telepathic, still-at-large-in-the-swamps first-generation Un-Man named Crassus). Crassus tricks Kane into traveling with him to Romania, promising the lad that his "creator", Arcane, might be able to help reverse the mutation. Of course, it is a trick: Crassus knows that Arcane is no longer in his castle redoubt. Crassus's secret goal is to make Kane rescue a gaggle of other next-generation Un-Men from the clutches of a depraved millionaire who forces them to perform in a private sideshow.

Through some form of prophecy that is never explained, the next-generation Un-Men recognize Kane as "the One" they have long expected to deliver them from captivity. Kane reluctantly helps his cousins revolt and slaughter their tormentors. The Un-Men then board a private jet for America, where they proceed to set the captive, cryogenically frozen original Un-Men free. Army soldiers and guns are involved, and ultimately Kane's love interest—a bald, legless and psychically powered second-generation Un-Woman named Scylla—is mowed down with bullets. The original Un-Men—mute and apparently retarded—toss themselves into a conveniently situated vat of acid, thereby making a statement about the tragic pathos of freakdom. Meanwhile, Crassus vanishes into the darkness of the swamp.

The military experiments are exposed, and Kane and his fellow survivors become celebrities, gracing the cover of Life magazine and appearing on TV talk shows. An embarrassed federal government grants them their own reservation settlement (on a former nuclear bomb testing site) and goth teens pay homage to the freaks at the camp perimeter. The Un-Men have become caged curiosities yet again. At the end of issue #5, Kane has mutated into a brooding endomorph, a veiny elder statesman narrating his tale from a private cave high above the new Un-Men encampment.
