= Anton Arcane =

Comic book supervillain

Publication information
- Publisher: DC Comics
- First appearance: Cameo appearance: Swamp Thing #1 (November 1972); Full appearance: Swamp Thing #2 (January 1973)
- Created by: Len Wein; Berni Wrightson

In-story information
- Species: Demon
- Place of origin: Hell
- Notable aliases: The Dark Avatar
- Abilities: Genius-level intellect; Mastery of maleficium

Anton Arcane is a supervillain appearing in American comic books by DC Comics. The character first appeared in Swamp Thing #2 (January 1973), and was created by writer Len Wein and artist Bernie Wrightson. He is the archenemy of Swamp Thing, the protagonist of the comics.

== Fictional character biography ==
Arcane is a scientist whose obsession with gaining immortality has led him to create monstrous creatures known as "Un-Men", as well as other monstrous biogenetic experimentations involving the dead. He was able to resurrect his deceased brother Gregori as the Patchwork Man. He is also a skilled magician, which he channels through his experiments.

Living in the mountains of Europe with his niece Abigail, Arcane is introduced after he discovers and lures the plant-based hero to his castle home. Arcane sought to use his scientific and magical abilities to transform his body into Swamp Thing's form, while changing Swamp Thing back into Alec Holland. At first grateful to be human again, Holland soon overheard Arcane discussing his evil intentions now that he could carry them out. Holland succeeds in breaking the spell Arcane cast, and sacrifices his humanity, so Arcane becomes a frail old man again. Pursued by Swamp Thing, Arcane fell to his death, only to be resurrected by his Un-Men in a new body. He then attacked Swamp Thing twice more before truly dying, the first time as a hulking corpse-like Un-Man (only to be destroyed by the vengeful ghosts of African-American slaves who had possessed his Un-Men) and later as an insect-like cyborg piloting a massive dragonfly-like vehicle. It is after his third death that his soul is consigned to Hell.

After a fight with Abigail that culminated in her leaving on foot to find Swamp Thing, Matthew Cable (Abigail's husband) had an attack of conscience and drives after her. He had been drinking heavily and ends up crashing his car, leaving him mortally wounded. Arcane manages to possess Cable's body, and with it gained access to Cable's reality-altering powers.

Arcane masquerades as Cable, claiming that he has a new job at a company called Blackriver Recorporations and is buying a mansion for them to live. Arcane combined his own magic with Cable's inherent psychic powers to alter reality and the employees of Blackriver Recorporations were the resurrected souls of deceased serial killers returned from Hell. He finally reveals himself, tormenting his niece and causing havoc and insanity by altering reality on a massive scale.

Cable regains control of his body and Arcane is exorcised directly back to Hell. Cable used his awakened power to resurrect Abigail's body, but not having sufficient power to repair himself, became comatose and finally died, whereupon he became Matthew, a raven living within the Dreaming.

Arcane next appears as a demon, having been promoted to this status by the Lords of Hell. After Lucifer abdicates from leadership of Hell, Arcane finally escapes to possess Swamp Thing's infant daughter Tefé Holland and later the corpse of Avery Sunderland. In a later episode, Arcane temporarily repents of his evil ways after having briefly found God, who eventually banishes him back to Hell. Arcane is tortured by the demon Josephine, whom he seduces into helping him escape.

=== The New 52 ===
In The New 52 continuity reboot, Anton Arcane is the avatar of the Rot, a cosmic force associated with death and decay. After being defeated by Swamp Thing, Arcane is put in a Hell specifically made for him by the Parliament of Decay when nothing ever rots and all is forever pure. Arcane's daughter Abigail, as the new avatar of the Rot, comes to him demanding information about her mother. Arcane reveals that when she was a baby she already had power over the Rot and she accidentally killed her by 'filling' her with the Rot. To make him talk Abigail lets him feel rot, but she now says he will never escape his Hell and will never touch rot again. Arcane says that when he touched it when she gave it to him, he became stronger than he had been in ages and he will escape and take revenge on both her and Alec Holland. As she teleports away, Arcane rips out one of his eyes and throws it in the portal. On Earth, a boy is about to eat an apple when it turns rotten. He throws it away and Arcane's eye appears in it.

When Swamp Thing goes into the Rot to warn Abigail about the new realm of machines, she initially assumes that he is there because of Arcane, who has escaped. It is eventually shown that he has returned to Earth, but since he is not the avatar of the Rot, he can only gain strength from consuming rotten items and is greatly weakened. He joins forces with the new realm of Metal, which promises him the power that he lost, and his power does grow greatly in this time. He later poisons the Green from within, when Swamp Thing is weakened in an attempt to destroy it, but this fails when all the avatars of the Green are awakened and use their power to cleanse the Green to its original state. Abigail challenges Arcane in the final war against Metal, and while she has the upper hand, Arcane eventually escapes.

In Futures End, it is revealed that five years in the future, a series of events conspired to ensure that all avatars swore to stay off of Earth and within their own realms to prevent chaos. Arcane only agreed to this if he was allowed to bind himself to Abigail. In doing so, he allowed himself to leech off her power, as the true avatar of the Rot, and ensuring that Swamp Thing could not fight him, without risking harm or death to the one he loved. However, Swamp Thing has made the decision to destroy the Rot, using the power of life through a White Lantern ring. Arcane attempts to dissuade him, by citing the necessity of death and rot, but Swamp Thing counters it by saying that fungi/the Grey and bacteria/the Divided have already decided to take over the role of rot, while Metal will keep them in check. Arcane then tries to give up Abigail, but Swamp Thing believes that there is enough life in her to let her survive and in the worst case, death is better than the Hell that she lives in. Arcane briefly tries to fight back, but Abigail makes her move to distract him, long enough for Swamp Thing to activate the White Lantern ring and kill on Arcane.

Arcane managed to return to power in the Rot and trapped Abigail in her own dream of past memories. Swearing vengeance, he makes a deal with Floronic Man to create a strain of Cordyceps capable of infecting people and wreaking havoc upon the world so the Rot reigns supreme. Animal Man convinces the Parliament of Bacteria to counteract the Cordyceps, thwarting his plan and freeing Abigail. Nevertheless, Arcane manages to escape the team's grasp.

== Powers and abilities ==
Anton Arcane possesses the knowledge of creating synthetic organs and skin, from those he made his Un-Men with. He also possesses many arcane artifacts, as well as necromancy, which enables him to control the dead.

In The New 52 continuity, Arcane is the avatar of the Rot, enabling him to manipulate rot, death, and decay to his will. When the Swamp Thing and Animal Man are trapped inside the Rot, Arcane uses this 'living' rot on everyone, except those who have a strong enough connection to the Red (animals) or the Green (plants).

== In other media ==
Arcane as seen in the Swamp Thing video game.

=== Television ===
- Anton Arcane appears in Swamp Thing (1990), portrayed by Mark Lindsay Chapman.
- Anton Arcane appears in Swamp Thing (1991), voiced by Don Francks.

=== Film ===
Anton Arcane appears in Swamp Thing (1982) and The Return of Swamp Thing, portrayed by Louis Jourdan.

=== Video games ===
- Anton Arcane appears as the final boss of Swamp Thing (1992).
- Anton Arcane appears as a character summon in Scribblenauts Unmasked: A DC Comics Adventure.
