= Swamp Thing (1991 TV series) =

Animated television series

- Genre: Superhero
- Based on: Swamp Thing by Len Wein and Bernie Wrightson
- Voices of: Len Carlson; Don Francks; Harvey Atkin; Philip Akin; Errol Slue; Gordon Masten; Joe Matheson; Paulina Gillis; Jonathan Potts; Richard Yearwood
- Composer: Michael Tavera
- Country of origin: United States
- No. of episodes: 5

Production
- Executive producers: Andy Heyward; Robby London; Benjamin Melniker; Michael E. Uslan
- Running time: 30 minutes
- Production companies: DIC Animation City; Batfilm Productions, Inc.; DC Comics

Original release
- Network: Fox (Fox Kids)
- Release: October 31, 1990 – May 11, 1991

Swamp Thing is an animated television series based on the Vertigo/DC Comics superhero character Swamp Thing. The series was short-lived, with the pilot episode airing on October 31, 1990 followed by four additional episodes airing weekly from April 20 to May 11, 1991. It aired on YTV from 1991 to 1993 in Canada. Produced by DIC Animation City, the series corresponded with Kenner's Swamp Thing action figure collection released in 1990. Despite the animated series' brief run, various merchandise was also produced in 1991 resulting in the only significant marketing platform ever created for the character. This was the final animated series from DC Comics to not be produced by Warner Bros. Animation.

Anton Arcane takes the role of the main villain responsible for Alec Holland's transformation into the Swamp Thing. Arcane is backed by his gang of Un-Men: Dr. Deemo, Weedkiller, and Skinman.

The Swamp Thing also has two friends named Tomahawk and Bayou Jack. Tomahawk is Native American and should not be confused with the DC/Vertigo character, Thomas Hawk, who was a soldier in the American Revolution rescued by Native Americans. Bayou Jack is a Vietnam veteran.

Similar to Troma's Toxic Crusaders, the animation style of Swamp Thing follows the trend of goofy, horror anti-heroes made for children. Spoofing Chip Taylor's "Wild Thing", the opening theme plays "Swamp Thing! ...You are amazing!"

Swamp Thing was apparently turned down by CBS, leading to its mid-season debut on FOX. Despite the series limited number of episodes, NBC featured it during Chip and Pepper's Cartoon Madness in fall 1991, and the Sci Fi Channel would syndicate it years later. The United Kingdom's Children's Channel also re-aired Swamp Thing in the 1990s.

The animated series aired concurrently with a more successful live-action adaptation of the comic book.

== Cast ==
- Swamp Thing (voiced by Len Carlson) is a scientist who was transformed into a humanoid plant monster after Anton Arcane destroyed his lab. He protects the swamp from evil using his ability to control plants.
- Anton Arcane (voiced by Don Francks) is a scientist obsessed with gaining immortality. He uses a transducer chamber to mutate himself and his henchman into monsters.
- Tomahawk (voiced by Harvey Atkin) is a Native American ally of Swamp Thing.
- Bayou Jack (voiced by Philip Akin) is an African American Vietnam veteran and ally of Swamp Thing. He is temporarily transformed into a mantis hybrid and joins the Un-Men.
- Dr. Deemo (voiced by Errol Slue) is a voodoo doctor who transforms into a snake-like monster.
- Skinman (voiced by Gordon Masten) is a frail, zombie-like man who transforms into a bat-like monster.
- Weed Killer (voiced by Joe Matheson) is a green-skinned, masked plant-killer who transforms into an insect-like monster.
- Abigail Arcane (voiced by Paulina Gillis) is Anton Arcane's stepdaughter and a love interest of Swamp Thing.
- Delbert and J.T. (voiced by Jonathan Potts and Richard Yearwood) are two young boys and friends of the heroes.

== Episodes ==
No.	Title	Written by	Original release date
1	"The Un-Men Unleashed"	Mark McCorkle & Bob Schooley	October 31, 1990
Dr. Arcane turns his henchmen into mutants to attack the Swamp Thing. Two kids, Delbert and J.T., along with Tomahawk, Bayou Jack and Arcane's stepdaughter Abby come to the Swamp Thing's rescue.
2	"To Live Forever"	Mark McCorkle & Bob Schooley	April 20, 1991
Dr. Arcane and his Un-Men travel to the Amazon rainforest in search of "the trees that never die", and enslaves a local Indian tribe to harvest their sap.
3	"Falling Red Star"	Mark McCorkle, Bob Schooley & Mike Medlock	April 27, 1991
The Swamp Thing, Bayou Jack and Tomahawk help NASA retrieve a nuclear-powered satellite that has crash-landed in the swamp. Meanwhile, Arcane desires the satellite for his own advantage.
4	"Legend of the Lost Cavern"	Mark McCorkle & Bob Schooley	May 4, 1991
Still obsessed on gaining immortality, Dr. Arcane desecrates the Indian burial of Tomahawk's ancestors in search of the Lost Caverns, home of the fabled Fountain of Youth.
5	"Experiment in Terror"	Bruce Shelly & Reed Shelly	May 11, 1991
While showing Delbert and J.T. around the swamp, the Swamp Thing is captured and taken to New Orleans for government experiments. Delbert, J.T. and Bayou Jack plan to rescue him, as does Arcane for his own plans.

== Home releases ==
"The Un-Men Unleashed" was released on VHS by Kenner in 1992 as a direct tie-in with the action figure line; its sleeve cover borrows card art from the Snare Arm Swamp Thing figure. A second release from Buena Vista Home Video, featuring a new cover, was released in 1994.

Sterling Entertainment released Swamp Thing - Guardian of the Earth on VHS and DVD on August 31, 2004. The VHS contains three episodes of the series, while the DVD includes all five episodes of the series.

In August 2004 (later reissued in August 2006), Anchor Bay UK released all five episodes of the animated series on DVD in the United Kingdom.

== Action figures ==
In 1990, Kenner produced a line of Swamp Thing action figures with vehicles and playsets that served as a direct counterpart to the animated series. Arcane and his Un-Men include translucent, rubbery BioMask accessories that give the effect of their transformation into monstrous creatures. Their eyes also glow-in-the-dark, a popular feature in action figures of the era. Arcane's transducer machine even includes a Mantid figure that referenced an episode where Bayou Jack is mutated. Some accessories would also be reused for Hasbro's The Original Battle Trolls in 1992.

According to an online fan source, Kenner invested approximately 6 million dollars into the Swamp Thing figure line. It also states that, according to Kenner, test results using male children between the ages of 6 and 11 showed them to be more popular than both G.I. Joe and Teenage Mutant Ninja Turtles.

Speculations that the Swamp Thing would have been included in the unproduced fourth series of Kenner's Super Powers Collection and that the Bio-Glow Swamp Thing may have been based on the prototype have been refuted by the uncovering of new information regarding the proposed fourth and fifth series of the Super Powers Collection.

=== Series 1 (1990) ===
- Bio-Glow Swamp Thing
- Camouflage Swamp Thing
- Capture Swamp Thing
- Snap Up Swamp Thing
- Snare Arm Swamp Thing
- Bayou Jack
- Tomahawk
- Anton Arcane
- Dr. Deemo
- Skinman
- Weed Killer

=== Vehicles and playsets (1990) ===
- Bayou Blaster
- Bog Rover
- Marsh Buggy
- Swamp Trap
- Transducer (w/ Mantid figure)

=== Series 2 (1991) ===
- Climbing Swamp Thing

== Video games and other merchandise ==
A Swamp Thing video game was developed for the NES and Game Boy. Both versions were released by THQ in December 1992 and were met with generally poor receptions. Also, there was a handheld game made by Tiger.

Tying in with the animated series, various Swamp Thing merchandise was produced in 1991. This included a paint by number kit, a "Battle for the Bayou" board game, a T-shirt, children's slippers, a bop bag, three pencil sharpeners, and figural chalk resembling the Swamp Thing. Perhaps an attempt to prevent consumers from confusing it as candy, the label of the chalk is especially curious with text hovering above the little figure with the words "I'm Chalk!". Much of the packaging of the Swamp Thing merchandise featured the work of comic book artist Alfredo Alcala.
