= Matthew Cable =

- Matthew Cable and Valentina Vostok as depicted in Showcase #96 (January 1978). Art by Jim Aparo.

Publication information
- Publisher: DC Comics
- First appearance: As Matthew Cable: Swamp Thing #1 (November 1972); As a raven: The Sandman (vol. 2) #11 (December 1989)
- Created by: Len Wein; Bernie Wrightson

In-story information
- Full name: Matthew Joseph Cable
- Species: Raven (formerly human)
- Supporting character of: Dream; Swamp Thing
- Notable aliases: Matthew the Raven

Matthew Joseph Cable is a character appearing in DC Comics' Swamp Thing series. Introduced in Swamp Thing (Volume 1) in November 1972, he was created by writer Len Wein and artist Bernie Wrightson. Years later, the character dies in The Dreaming and is later resurrected as Dream's raven in Neil Gaiman's rendition of The Sandman.

Henderson Wade played Matthew Cable in the television series based on the comic book series of the same name for the DC streaming service. In The Sandman, Matthew's raven form is voiced by Patton Oswalt.

== Fictional character biography ==
Matthew Cable is a government agent assigned to protect Alec Holland and Linda Holland as they work on their bio-restorative formula in the Louisiana bayou. Cable fails to save them from the machinations of the Conclave, a secret organization that wants the couple to work for its own ends, and the Hollands are killed. When Swamp Thing rises from the bayou, Cable believes it was responsible for the Hollands' deaths and sets out to avenge them. Cable's search take him through the Balkans, where he meets Abby Arcane, niece of Anton Arcane. For years, Swamp Thing believes himself to be Holland; after learning this, Cable lets him go. Cable and Abby later marry and settle in Houma, Louisiana.

Eventually, Cable's mind becomes damaged, which gives him the ability to alter reality. His marriage with Abigail begins to deteriorate. After a fight with Abigail that culminates in her leaving to find Swamp Thing, Cable has an attack of conscience and drives after her. Having been drinking heavily, he ends up crashing his car, mortally wounding himself. A large fly appears and offers to revive Cable, who agrees, allowing it to crawl down his throat. In reality, Anton Arcane, who died and went to Hell, finds a way out by way of Cable. He possesses the fly and then Cable's body, and with it gains Cable's godlike power. Eventually, Cable manages to send Arcane back to Hell, but at the cost of the effects of the car crash catching up with him. Still possessing enough power to repair one body and not wanting to live, Cable manages to bring Abigail back to life before falling into a coma. After lessons learned within the Dreaming while comatose (and in an effort to help Abigail move on), Cable rises one final time and destroys the machinery sustaining him, thus ending his life.

Since Cable technically died while in the Dreaming, Dream resurrects him in the form of a raven. He lives with Eve in Dream's domain. His purpose, and the purpose of all the ravens that Dream had previously, is somewhat questionable. Dream seems to keep the ravens around out of some sort of unspoken need for companionship. The ravens are created by Dream, offering the position to people who died, usually while dreaming, and releasing them from service if they so wish.

== In other media ==
=== Television ===
- Matthew Cable appears in Swamp Thing (2019), portrayed by Henderson Wade. This version is a police officer.
- Matthew the Raven appears in The Sandman (2022), voiced by Patton Oswalt.

=== Film ===
Alice Cable, a character based on Matthew Cable and Abby Holland, appears in Swamp Thing (1982), portrayed by Adrienne Barbeau.

=== Miscellaneous ===
Matthew the Raven appears in The Sandman (2020) audio drama series, voiced by Andy Serkis.

== See also ==
- List of characters in The Sandman
