= Ram V =

Indian comic book writer and artist

- Born: Ramnarayan Venkatesan; November 5, 1986 (age 40) Mumbai, Maharashtra, India
- Areas: Writer, Artist
- Notable works: Grafity's Wall; These Savage Shores; The Many Deaths of Laila Starr; The Swamp Thing; Justice League Dark; Catwoman; Detective Comics; Carnage
- Awards: Eisner Award

Ramnarayan Venkatesan, known professionally as Ram V, is an Indian comics writer and artist who has worked for independent comics, DC Comics, and Marvel Comics. He won an Eisner Award for Best Graphic Album—Reprint for The One Hand and The Six Fingers in 2025 and has been nominated for Harvey and Ringo Awards.

== Career ==
Ram V began his comics writing career in 2012 with the Indian comic series Aghori, published by Holy Cow Entertainment. The series debuted at the inaugural Comic Con Bengaluru in September 2012. Ram V served as the lead writer for the original 13-issue run of the series, spanning the 'Origins' and 'Bloodlines' arcs from 2012 to 2016. He subsequently wrote the first three issues of the sequel series Age of Immortals (2016–2017) before moving to international projects. In 2016 he self-published Black Mumba, which featured art by Devmalya Pramanik, Kishore Mohan, Rosh and Aditya Bidikar, through Kickstarter. He then went on to publish Grafity's Wall at Unbound in 2018, which went on to be picked up and published by Dark Horse Comics in 2020. These were followed by These Savage Shores (Vault) in 2019 and Blue in Green (Image) in 2020. In 2021, he reunited with Blue in Green artist Anand RK for a new series for Vault Comics, Radio Apocalypse. In 2022, he was nominated for an Eisner and Harvey Award for The Many Deaths of Laila Starr, a Boom! Studios comic he did with Filipe Andrade. In 2024, V and Andrade reunited to make another comic, Rare Flavours, for Boom!, which was then nominated for a Ringo Award.

In 2018, he wrote his first story for DC Comics in Batman Secret Files #1, "The Nature of Fear." In 2020, it was announced that he and Mike Perkins were going to be doing a new Swamp Thing series, involving a new protagonist named Levi Kamei. Then, V and artist Fernando Blanco took over as the creative team for Catwoman at issue #25.

In 2021, he was announced as the new co-writer of Venom alongside Al Ewing. He stated: "I think the story interactions between Venom the symbiote, Venom—his father's symbiote, Dylan's own history and his attempt at finding a new equilibrium are all fascinating things to delve into as we tell this drama through an action-packed tense thriller with a hint of sci-fi, horror." In March 2022, he became the writer of a new volume of Carnage.

In 2022, it was announced that Ram V and Rafael Albuquerque were going to be the new creative team for Detective Comics beginning with issue #1062. Their run ended in 2024 with issue #1089. In 2023, he was announced as the writer of The Vigil, a new team book among the "We Are Legends" line of AAPI heroes. Additionally, he and artist Christian Ward teamed up for Aquaman: Andromeda, a three-issue mini-series from DC Black Label.

In 2024, it was announced that he would be the writer for The New Gods alongside artist Evan Cagle. "Many of the story elements come from my reading of Hindu mythology. The original work takes a lot from Greco-Roman mythology; the gods are modeled on archetypes. The Hindu gods that I grew up with are more nuanced and complex, often making silly mistakes because they are powerful, not because they are perfect. Their slightest whim has dramatic consequences."

In 2024, he was also announced as the co-writer (alongside Dan Watters) for Creature from the Black Lagoon Lives!, one of the Universal Monsters comics put out by Skybound/Image. In April 2024, Polygon announced that Dawnrunner, a Dark Horse comic by V and Evan Cagle about mechas, was "one of the year's best new comics." In November 2024, it was announced that Ram V, Garth Ennis, Marguerite Bennett, Joe Pruett, and Adam Glass were forming an imprint of Image Comics called Ninth Circle.

== Personal life ==
Ram V was born and raised in Mumbai, but has worked and traveled worldwide. Before he was a writer, he worked as a chemical engineer. "I used to travel a lot as a Chemical Engineer. I went to a lot of countries I had never visited before, stayed on my own in obscure industrial towns where tourism is sparse. I discovered cultures and traditions and local stories and legends. And yet through it all, I found that there is commonality of human experience. People fundamentally want similar things, they worry about similar things, the things that bring them joy are similar. If I can communicate this fact through my fiction, it will have been a rewarding experience."

Currently, he lives in London.

== Bibliography ==
=== DC Comics ===
- Aquaman: Andromeda #1-3 (DC Black Label) (2022)
- Batman
  - Batman Secret Files #1, short story "The Nature of Fear" (2018)
  - Batman/Catwoman Special #1, short story "Reflections of the Heart" (2022)
  - Batman: Urban Legends #11-13, three-part story "Stigma" (2022)
  - Detective Comics #1062-1089, 2022 Annual (2022–2024)
  - Future State: Gotham #13 (2022)
- Catwoman
  - Catwoman vol. 5 #9, 14-15, 25-38, 2021 Annual (2019–2022)
  - Catwoman 80th Anniversary 100-Page Super Spectacular #1 (2020)
  - Future State: Catwoman #1-2 (2021)
- Dark Crisis: The Deadly Green #1 (2022)
- DC Festival of Heroes: The Asian Superhero Celebration #1, short story "Masks" (2021)
- DC's Crimes of Passion #1, short story "Reflections of the Heart" (2020)
- Green Arrow 80th Anniversary 100-Page Super Spectacular #1, short story "The Arrow and the Song" (2021)
- Justice League Dark
  - Justice League vol. 4 #59-71, Justice League Dark backup stories (2021–2022)
  - Justice League Dark vol. 2 #20-28, 2021 Annual, Justice League Dark Annual vol. 2 #1 (2020–2021)
  - Future State: Justice League #1-2 (2021)
- Lazarus Planet: Next Evolution #1, short story "The Vigil: See No Evil" (2023)
- New Gods (vol. 5) #1-12 (2024–2025)
- New Year's Evil vol. 2 #1, short story "A Coal in My Stocking" (2020)
- Strange Love Adventures #1, short story "Dinner for Two" (2022)
- Swamp Thing
  - The Swamp Thing #1-16 (2021–2022)
  - Future State: Swamp Thing #1-2 (2021)
  - Legend of the Swamp Thing: Halloween Spectacular #1 short story "At the Heart of the Trees" (2020)
- We Are Legends
  - Dawn of DC: We Are Legends Special Edition #1 (2023)
  - The Vigil #1-6 (2023–2024)

=== Marvel Comics ===
- Carnage
  - Carnage: Black, White & Blood #2 (2021)
  - Carnage Forever #1 (2022)
  - Carnage Vol. 3 #1-10 (2022–2023)
  - Web of Carnage #1 (2023)
- Venom
  - Free Comic Book Day 2021: Spider-Man/Venom #1 (2021)
  - Free Comic Book Day 2022: Spider-Man/Venom #1 (2022)
  - Venom vol. 5 #1-4, 6-7, 11-12, 15 (2021–2023)
- War of the Realms: War Scrolls #1 (2019)

=== Image Comics ===
- Blue in Green (2020)
- The One Hand #1-5 (2024)
- Paradiso #1-8 (2017–2018)
- Silver Coin #7 (2021)
- Universal Monsters: Creature From the Black Lagoon Lives! #1-4 (2024)

=== Other publishers ===
==== Action Lab ====
- Brigands #1-5 (2016–2017)
- Ruin of Thieves: A Brigands Story #1-4 (2018)

==== Boom! Studios ====
- The Many Deaths of Laila Starr #1-5 (2021)
- Rare Flavours #1-6 (2023–2024)

==== Dark Horse Comics ====
- Grafity's Wall (2020)
- Dawnrunner #1-5 (2024)

==== DSLTRY ====
- The Devil's Cut #1, short story "Waiting to Die" (2023)

==== Holy Cow Entertainment ====
- Aghori #1-13, (2012–2016)
- Aghori Annual #1-2 (2012–2013)
- Aghori Age of Immortals #1-4 (2016–2017)

==== Rebellion Press ====
- The Action 2020 Special, short story "Kids Rule O.K." (2020)

==== Tiny Onion ====
- Razorblades: The Horror Magazine #1-5 (2020–2021)

==== Titan Comics ====
- Quake Champions #1-3 (2017)

==== Vault Comics ====
- Radio Apocalypse #1-2 (2022)
- These Savage Shores #1-5 (2019)

Preceded by Blake Northcott and Sean Murphy	Catwoman writer 2020-2022	Succeeded by Tini Howard
Preceded by Mariko Tamaki	Detective Comics writer 2022-2024	Succeeded by Tom Taylor
Preceded by Donny Cates	Venom writer 2021-2023 (co-written with Al Ewing)	Succeeded by Al Ewing
