= Un-Men =

Group of fictional characters

Publication information
- Publisher: DC Comics
- First appearance: Cameo appearance: Swamp Thing #1 (November 1972); Full appearance: Swamp Thing #2 (January 1973)
- Created by: Len Wein; Bernie Wrightson

In-story information
- Member(s): Members

The Un-Men are a group of fictional characters in the DC/Vertigo Comics universe. Created by the writer/artist team of Len Wein and Bernie Wrightson, the Un-Men are a group of reanimated and reconstructed "synthetic men" who made their first appearance in 1972, in issues #1–2 of the original Swamp Thing comic book series. The characters made subsequent appearances in later issues of Swamp Thing and its successor series, The Saga of the Swamp Thing (vol. 2) (later renamed Swamp Thing (vol. 2)), and in the 1994 five-issue Vertigo miniseries, American Freak: A Tale of the Un-Men. In August 2007, Vertigo (DC's "mature readers line") launched The Un-Men, a monthly comic book series chronicling the further exploits of these characters. 13 issues of that title were published.

== History ==
=== Appearances in Swamp Thing comics ===
The Un-Men are "synthetic men" created by the scientist/sorcerer Anton Arcane in his mountain castle in the Balkans. Arcane dispatches a group of these deformed creatures to Louisiana to capture Swamp Thing. Obsessed with obtaining immortality, the elderly and ailing Arcane intends to transfer his mind and soul into Swamp Thing's indestructible plant body. Arcane explains to the captive plant creature that the Un-Men "are the result of my first experimentations — crude, but totally dedicated to me". Swamp Thing chases Arcane to the top of his castle tower, where Arcane plunges to his death. His loyal Un-Men jump after him, presumably to their deaths.

The Un-Men are hideously deformed humanoid creatures, no two of whom were alike. It is not entirely clear how Arcane constructed his Un-Men, but several of them are made of stitched-together body parts, like Frankenstein's monster. The resulting creatures sport all manner and class of bodily aberrations: multiple heads, extra limbs, and even partial animal anatomies.

The two most distinctive Un-Men are Ophidian, a talking snake-like creature with 10 pairs of legs and hypnotic powers, and Cranius, Arcane's majordomo and the leader of the Un-Men. Described as "the living brain", Cranius is an oversized brain with a human face that is grafted onto a large human hand. Cranius uses his fingers for locomotion. In later appearances, Cranius is shown to have telepathic powers. The Un-Men and Arcane (reborn in an Un-Man body made by his creations) return in issue #10 to further harass Swamp Thing.

Arcane creates a second-generation group of Un-Men resembling insects, usually with human-like heads. At the end of this story arc, Arcane is eaten by his own Un-Men.

Swamp Thing (vol. 2) #82–83 explores Arcane's early history as a battlefield medic for the German Army during World War I. The young Arcane is shown stitching together the body parts of dead soldiers in a series of unauthorized necromantic experiments. During World War II, Arcane created the first Un-Men, who were made from whatever body parts he could find.

Their next appearance was in Swamp Thing (vol. 2) #136–138, in a story arc that had Arcane returning to Earth from Hell and demonically possessing the preserved body of the late General Sunderland, a defense contractor who had previously frozen and vivisected Swamp Thing. Neither Cranius nor any of the insectoid Un-Men appear in this arc. Rather, Arcane is shown creating a new group of Un-Men, most notably Dr. Polygon, a man with multiple faces and psychic powers. Multiple ogre-like Un-Men are shown at Sunderland Corp. headquarters in Washington, D.C. At the end of this arc, Sunderland's daughter, Connie, turns against Arcane and blows up the Sunderland facility, Arcane, and, presumably, most of the Un-Men.

=== American Freak: A Tale of the Un-Men miniseries ===
In 1994, Vertigo published a five-issue miniseries, American Freak: A Tale of the Un-Men, written by Dave Louapre and illustrated by Vince Locke. American Freak focuses on a new set of characters, described as the offspring of the original Arcane Un-Men. The Army conducted painful, inhumane experiments on the captive Un-Men, toward the goal of "mating" them and then producing a "serum" that would eliminate deformity in the offspring. The serum proved unstable and all of the offspring, except for Damien Kane, died. Kane developed normally until he turned 23 years of age, at which time he began to horribly mutate. The story follows Kane's transformation and his escape with the assistance of a telepathic, first-generation Un-Man named Crassus. Crassus tricks Kane into traveling with him to Romania, promising him that that Arcane may be able to reverse his mutation. Of course, it is a trick: Crassus knows that Arcane is no longer in his castle fortress. Crassus's secret goal is to make Kane rescue a gaggle of other next generation Un-Men from the clutches of a depraved millionaire who forces them to perform in a private sideshow.

The next-generation Un-Men recognize Kane as "the One" they have long expected to deliver them from captivity. Kane reluctantly helps The Un-Men revolt and slaughter their tormentors. The Un-Men then board a private jet for America, where they proceed to set the captive, cryogenically frozen original Un-Men free. The Un-Men are attacked by the Army, who shoot and kill Kane's lover - a bald, legless and psychic second-generation Un-Man named Scylla. The original Un-Men — mute and possessing diminished mental capability — toss themselves into a vat of acid. The federal government grants Kane and the surviving Un-Men a settlement on a former nuclear testing site.

=== Monthly series ===
A monthly series, written by John Whalen and illustrated by Mike Hawthorne, premiered in August 2007 and saw a 13-issue run. The first story arc takes place more than a decade after the founding of the Un-Men reservation in American Freak. Damien Kane has apparently died and his reservation has been taken over by the original Un-Men, led by Cranius. Under the control of Cranius, the reservation is turned into Aberrance U.S.A., a freak-themed tourist attraction. When a "natural-born" performing freak (i.e., not an Un-Man) from Aberrance is murdered, Agent Kilcrop of the U.S. Department of Energy is called in to investigate.

Kilcrop, an African American albino, believes that his superiors at the D.O.E. picked him for the assignment because they consider him to be their "house freak". Kilcrop suspects that Cranius and company may be involved in a cover-up of the missing performer's death. Facing the resistance of Cranius, but gaining the unanticipated aid of Un-Man Niko Parish, Kilcrop uncovers a conspiracy in a town divided by the Un-Men and the "gaffs", natural-born freaks marginalized as second-class citizens by the custom-built Un-Men. The artificially enhanced Un-Men apparently consider the natural-born freaks of Aberrance to be "fakes", i.e., "pretenders" and "nature's accidents" who pale in comparison to the Promethean creations of Anton Arcane and the next-generation Un-Men built by Arcane's first lieutenant, Cranius.

Kilcrop learns that a subset of the gaffs have formed a religious cult around the late Damien Kane, founder of Aberrance and a figure romanticized by locals as a "freak's tribune". The gaffs believe that Kane will return to avenge the hostile takeover of Aberrance by Cranius and the other original Un-Men. Over the course of the first five-issue story arc, it is revealed that Damien Kane is still alive—more or less—having mutated into a living mass of flesh that Cranius has trapped and locked away in a hidden laboratory behind his office. Cranius has been secretly using Kane's flesh—which has remarkable regenerative properties—to create the radical body modifications of his next-generation Un-Men, including Niko's winged enhancements. Unknown to Cranius, Kane possesses limited telepathic control of these new Un-Men. Kilcrop discovers that Kane has been telepathically directing Cranius' next-generation Un-Men to murder the original Un-Men who seized control of Aberrance. Kane escapes from Cranius' lab and attacks Cranius on the rooftop of the Un-Men corporate headquarters. Kilcrop destroys Kane, saving Cranius in the process.

Cranius intercedes with the government—which is secretly funding the Un-Men's freak-building experiments—and has Agent Kilcrop reassigned to become permanent chief of security in Aberrance. Kilcrop accepts the assignment only after Niko—with whom he has become enamored—urges him to take the job. Eventually, it is revealed that Kilcrop was a circus performer who entered violent staged matches against his (non-albino) brother, has a past with Cranius, and, as one of the heads of the Aberrance, "inseminated" himself so he could have an heir.

Doctor Sunderland, a beauty-obsessed scientist, comes to Aberrance to aid Cranius in restoring Compound K, in exchange for a cadre of insectoid, bestial Un-Men to sell as living weapons. Niko, the only one able to tell Kilcrop of the plot, is shushed under the threat of revealing her past before Aberrance: a wanted felon for killing her abusive father.

The insectoid Un-Men are freed in Aberrance, showing the ability to "infect" over beings. Kilcrop is able to contain the skirmish, but several guards are killed. Niko Parish is turned in a nearly mindless mantis-like form, but not before professing her love for Kilcrop.

Agent Kilcrop allows the D.O.E. to put him on trial for his inability to contain the rebellion; he is stripped from his role, disgraced in the F.B.I. ranks, and considered a "person of interest". Aberrance is shut down, and Kilcrop aids Cranius in attempting to restore Niko to her humanoid form.

=== The New 52 ===
In September 2011, The New 52 rebooted DC's continuity. In this new timeline, the Un-Men are first seen accompanying Felix Faust, the Rotlings, and the rotted heroes and villains in the attack upon the Red. The Un-Men later engage Swamp Thing and the forces of the Green outside Anton Arcane's castle.

== Members ==
=== Original Un-Men membership ===
- Cranius – One of the original Un-Men. He resembles a disembodied head on a disembodied hand.
- Ophidian – One of the original Un-Men.
- Patchwork Man (Gregori Arcane) - The brother of Anton Arcane who died and was put back together in a misshapen state by Anton. He possesses super-strength.

=== Second generation membership ===
- Abel -
- Adam -
- Brontes - The spawn of two unidentified Un-Men.
- Crassus - An Un-Men who possesses telepathy.
- Daedalus - The spawn of two unidentified Un-Men.
- Damien Kane - The spawn of two unidentified Un-Men who possesses super-strength.
- Doubles -
- Eve -
- Four Arms -
- Scylla - The spawn of two unidentified Un-Men who possesses precognition and telepathy.

== In other media ==
An original incarnation of the Un-Men appear in Swamp Thing. It consisting of Dr. Deemo (voiced by Errol Slue), a bokor who speaks in rhyme and was mutated into a snake-like creature; Skinman (voiced by Gordon Masten), a zombie-like man who was mutated into a bat-like creature; Weedkiller (voiced by Joe Matheson), a gas mask-wearing plant exterminator who was mutated into a leech/centipede monster; and Bayou Jack (voiced by Philip Akin), a Vietnam war veteran who was mutated into a mantis-like monster. This version of the group are humans who were temporarily mutated by Anton Arcane's transducer machine.
