= Tefé Holland =

Non-Binary Comics character

- Textless cover of Swamp Thing (vol. 3) #3 (July 2000), art by Phil Hale

Publication information
- Publisher: DC Comics
- First appearance: As the Sprout: Swamp Thing (vol. 2) #65 (October 1987); As Tefé Holland: Swamp Thing (vol. 2) #90 (December 1989)
- Created by: The Sprout: Rick Veitch; Tefé Holland: Doug Wheeler; Pat Broderick

In-story information
- Notable aliases: The Sprout; Mary Conway

Tefé Holland is a fictional character in comic books published by DC Comics. She is the daughter of Alec Holland/the Swamp Thing and Abby Holland.

Tefé was originally a floating spirit called the Sprout, who tried to find a body from a recently deceased person; she was eventually given a body through Abby Holland having a baby, which was conceived through the Swamp Thing possessing John Constantine and having sex with her. Due to Constantine having the demon Nergal's blood in his veins at the time, Tefe is also part demon. She eventually became an Earth elemental like her father, beginning a line of human Earth elementals as a new Swamp Thing, having all of her father's powers, but retaining a human appearance. She no longer has these powers.

== Publication history ==
The Sprout first appeared in Swamp Thing (vol. 2) #65 (October 1987), created by writer-artist Rick Veitch. Tefé Holland first appeared in Swamp Thing (vol. 2) #90 (December 1989), created by writer Doug Wheeler and artist Pat Broderick, named after the Brazilian city of Tefé, home of the Parliament of Trees.

Tefé is the featured character in the third Swamp Thing series from 2000 to 2001, launching the comics career of series writer Brian K. Vaughan. The series lasted 20 issues, with two tie-in specials featuring Tefé by Vaughan.

== Fictional character biography ==
Believing the Earth elemental known as the Swamp Thing to be dead, the collective consciousness of nature known as the Green created a new protector in the form of a young sprout. When the Green discovered that the creature was still alive, they ordered this now-redundant Sprout executed. A reprieve came in the form of the Hell-bound magician John Constantine. The Swamp Thing inhabited Constantine's body to impregnate his human wife, Abby Holland, with the seed of this Sprout. Cloaked in the flesh and blood of an infant child, this first human elemental was given the name Tefé with the ability to manipulate both vegetation and flesh on an elemental scale.

The Swamp Thing and Abby Holland hoped that their child would be a better elemental, one able to mend the rift between the two worlds. They named her after the river that flows from the Parliament of Trees' grove. But the Parliament, composed of retired Earth elementals, seemed to go crazy. They wanted to convince Tefé that her true mission was to punish humans for crimes against nature. The Swamp Thing did not allow it, but a part of Tefé truly believed her destiny was to destroy the human race. Frightened and confused, she disappeared shortly thereafter. For more than a year, Abby had no idea where she was. Because of this, the Swamp Thing and Abby decided to separate.

After months of living the sort of normal, boring existence that Abby thought that she wanted, she decided to find her daughter and bring her back into her life. Abby spends over a year following leads until she tracks her down to Westlake, Ohio. To her surprise, she finds her husband waiting for her and they get back together. But this was a bad time, for they find that Tefé has fused a group of loggers' hands and feet together and strung them up like big paper dolls until they bled into one another.

At this point, the couple realize that they are going to have to get some outside assistance. They believe the only person who can help them is John Constantine. He tells them Tefé's power is too powerful to simply be destroyed. The power of the Green is too much for any child to handle and she might destroy the world before the power finally destroys her. Constantine decides her powers cannot be removed, but they can be suppressed, at the cost of one human life. John can erase Tefé's memories, but they need to switch her with another little girl and put her in a new world with a new life and a new family that will love her as their own, or Tefé will go right back to her old self. They choose Mary Conway, an already terminally ill girl days away from dying. Constantine temporarily erases Tefé's memories, the Swamp Thing then manipulates Tefé's own flesh-shaping powers to give her Mary's exact appearance. Her body was transformed down to the very last cell.

Tefé's true nature was reawakened, as she murdered two of Mary Conway's friends and used her powers to create a lifeless simulacrum of Mary herself, presumably to convince the Swamp Thing and Abby that their daughter was dead. Refusing to pay blind allegiance to the Green or humanity, Tefé is now looking for something she can trust to tell her what her true purpose is. She is willing to destroy anything that gets in her way.

When Tefé goes back to the Green she meets Knoll, a minor plant elemental who takes her to see the Parliament of Trees. To her dismay, the entire Parliament is dead. The supposedly immortal Parliament started out as trees, but in the end, they were not any different from humans. They eventually grew mad with power and crumbled into nothing. Knoll tells Tefé the reason she was brought here is to realize what happens to plants who try to be something they are not and that she is either a part of the Green or she is human. Since Tefé has the power to obliterate every last man and woman and reclaim this planet for the plants, Knoll wants to use her as a weapon against humans. When asked which side she chooses, Tefé responds, "My own", and leaves.

Tefé then takes a job on a crab boat, where she meets a man named Lawrence. Lawrence is trying to write a book using Tefé as the main character. But after four months of trying, he decides Tefé is just too one-dimensional to be the heart of his story. He decides that sometimes, the best thing an author can do to his story is cut the one thing he loves most. Lawrence stabs Tefé and frames fellow crew member Hank. The captain believes his story and Hank is hanged. Chaos ensues as the captain's daughter Cheryl believes that her father is the murderer and blames Hank, who he discovered to be Cheryl’s secret lover, as an excuse to murder him. In anger, she forces her father at gun point to jump into the storm-ridden waters. When she realizes she was wrong and is about to commit suicide until Tefé seemingly comes back from the dead. To save himself from Tefé, Lawrence takes Cheryl hostage. He ends up shooting her and her (and Hank’s) unborn child and Tefé feeds him to the crabs. She tries to save Cheryl’s pregnancy with her power, but is unable to.

Like John Constantine, Tefé is bisexual, being in a relationship with a woman named Zaina.

In the DC Infinite Frontier era, she returns in the new Swamp Thing series starring Levi Kamei.

== In other media ==
- Tefé Holland appears in Harley Quinn, voiced by Vico Ortiz. This version works for the Legion of Doom as one of Poison Ivy's mentees, the Natural Disasters.
  - Tefé Holland makes a non-speaking cameo appearance in the Kite Man: Hell Yeah! episode "Grand Reopening, Hell Yeah!".

== Reception ==
Brandon Thomas of Silver Bullet Comic Books felt that Brian K. Vaughan's run had "incredibly strong characterization".

== See also ==
- John Constantine
