= Penny Blake =

Penny Blake may refer to:

- Penny Blake (actress) in Snow White: The Fairest of Them All
- Penny Blake (The Walking Dead), fictional character in The Walking Dead, niece/daughter of The Governor
