= Batman (1989 film) =

1989 superhero film by Tim Burton

- Theatrical release poster by Bill Garland
- Directed by: Tim Burton
- Screenplay by: Sam Hamm; Warren Skaaren
- Story by: Sam Hamm
- Based on: Characters by DC Comics; Batman by; Bob Kane; Bill Finger (Note: Bill Finger, co-creator of Batman, the Penguin, and Catwoman, was uncredited at the time of the film's release and his name was not added to any Batman-related media until 2016.)
- Produced by: Jon Peters; Peter Guber
- Starring: Jack Nicholson; Michael Keaton; Kim Basinger; Robert Wuhl; Pat Hingle; Billy Dee Williams; Michael Gough; Jack Palance
- Cinematography: Roger Pratt
- Edited by: Ray Lovejoy
- Music by: Danny Elfman (score); Prince (songs)
- Production companies: Warner Bros.; Guber-Peters Company; PolyGram Pictures
- Distributed by: Warner Bros.
- Release dates: June 19, 1989 (Westwood, Los Angeles); June 23, 1989 (United States); August 11, 1989 (United Kingdom)
- Running time: 126 minutes
- Countries: United States; United Kingdom
- Language: English
- Budget: $48 million
- Box office: $411.6 million

Batman is a 1989 superhero film directed by Tim Burton and written by Sam Hamm and Warren Skaaren. Based on the DC Comics character, it is the first installment of Warner Bros.' initial Batman film series. The film stars Jack Nicholson, Michael Keaton, Kim Basinger, Robert Wuhl, Pat Hingle, Billy Dee Williams, Michael Gough, and Jack Palance. The film's score was composed by Danny Elfman, and songs were written by Prince. The film takes place early in the war on crime of the title character (Keaton) and depicts his conflict with his archenemy the Joker (Nicholson).

After Burton was hired as director in 1986, Steve Englehart and Julie Hickson wrote film treatments before Hamm wrote the first screenplay. Batman was not greenlit until after the success of Burton's Beetlejuice (1988). The tone and themes of the film were partly influenced by Alan Moore and Brian Bolland's The Killing Joke and Frank Miller's The Dark Knight Returns. The film primarily adapts and then diverges from the "Red Hood" origin story for the Joker, having Batman inadvertently cause gangster Jack Napier to fall into Axis Chemical acid, triggering his transformation into the psychotic Joker. Additionally, Batman co-creator Bob Kane worked as a consultant for the film.

Numerous leading men were considered for the role of Batman before Keaton was cast. Keaton's casting was controversial since, by 1988, he had become typecast as a comedic actor and many observers had doubt he could portray a serious role. Nicholson accepted the role of the Joker under strict conditions that dictated top billing, a portion of the film's earnings (including associated merchandise), and his own shooting schedule. Filming took place at Pinewood Studios from October 1988 to January 1989. The budget escalated from $30 million to $48 million, while the 1988 Writers Guild of America strike forced Hamm to drop out. Skaaren did rewrites, with additional uncredited drafts done by Charles McKeown and Jonathan Gems.

Batman was both critically and financially successful, earning over $400 million in box office totals. Critics and audiences particularly praised Nicholson and Keaton's performances, Burton's direction, the production design, and composer Elfman's score. It was the sixth-highest-grossing film in history at the time of its release. The film received several Saturn Award nominations and a Golden Globe nomination for Nicholson's performance, and won the Academy Award for Best Art Direction.

The film was followed by three sequels: Batman Returns (1992), with both Burton and Keaton returning; Batman Forever (1995), with Joel Schumacher directing and Val Kilmer in the lead role; and Batman & Robin (1997), which featured George Clooney in the role. Keaton would later reprise the role of Batman in the DC Extended Universe film The Flash (2023). The film also led to the development of Batman: The Animated Series (1992–1995), which in turn began the DC Animated Universe of spin-off media, and has influenced Hollywood's modern marketing and development techniques of the superhero film genre. Two sequel novels were written by John Jackson Miller, Batman: Resurrection (2024) and Batman: Revolution (2025).

== Plot ==
Newspaper reporter Alexander Knox and photojournalist Vicki Vale investigate sightings of "Batman", a masked vigilante targeting Gotham City's criminals. Both attend a fundraiser hosted by billionaire Bruce Wayne, who is secretly Batman, having chosen this path after witnessing a mugger murder his parents when he was a child. During the event, Wayne becomes attracted to Vale.

Meanwhile, mob boss Carl Grissom sends his sociopathic second-in-command Jack Napier to break into Axis Chemicals and retrieve incriminating evidence. However, this is secretly a ploy to have Napier murdered for carrying on an affair with Grissom's mistress, Alicia Hunt. Corrupt Gotham City police lieutenant Max Eckhardt arranges the hit on Napier by conducting an unauthorized raid on Axis Chemicals. However, Commissioner James Gordon learns of the raid and takes command, ordering the officers to capture Napier alive. Batman also appears, while Napier shoots and kills Eckhardt as revenge for the double-cross. During a scuffle with Batman, Napier topples off a catwalk and falls into a vat of chemicals. Although presumed dead, Napier survives with various disfigurements including chalk white skin and emerald-green hair and nails. He undergoes surgery to repair the damage, but ends up with a rictus grin. Driven insane by his hideous appearance, Napier, now calling himself "the Joker", kills Grissom, massacres Grissom's associates, and takes over his operations.

The Joker begins terrorizing Gotham by lacing various hygiene products with "Smylex" – a deadly chemical that causes victims to die laughing. Joker soon becomes obsessed with Vicki and lures her to the Flugelheim Museum, which his henchmen vandalize. Batman rescues Vicki, takes her to the Batcave, and provides her with all of his research on Smylex, which will allow Gotham's residents to escape the toxin. Conflicted with his love for her, Wayne visits her apartment intending to reveal his secret identity, only for the Joker to interrupt the meeting. Joker asks Wayne, "Have you ever danced with the devil in the pale moonlight?", which Wayne recognizes as the phrase used by the mugger who murdered his parents. He shoots Wayne, who survives by hiding a serving tray underneath his shirt.

Vicki is taken to the Batcave by Wayne's butler, Alfred Pennyworth, who had been coaxing the relationship between the pair. After Vicki learns his secret, Wayne chooses to battle the Joker for the sake of the city over their relationship. He then departs to destroy the Axis plant used to create Smylex. Meanwhile, Joker lures Gotham's citizens to a parade honoring Gotham's bicentennial with the promise of free money. This turns out to be a trap designed to dose them with Smylex gas held within giant parade balloons. Batman foils his plan by using his Batwing to remove the balloons, but Joker shoots him down. The Batwing crashes in front of a cathedral, which Joker uses to take Vicki hostage. Batman pursues the Joker, and in the ensuing fight, he identifies Napier killed his parents and thus, indirectly created Batman. Joker eventually pulls Batman and Vicki over the cathedral's roof, leaving them hanging while he calls for a helicopter piloted by his goons, who throw down a ladder for him to climb. Batman uses a grappling hook to attach Joker's leg to a crumbling gargoyle that eventually falls off the roof. Unable to bear the statue's immense weight, Joker falls to his death while Batman and Vicki make it to safety.

Sometime later, Gordon announces that the police have arrested all of Joker's men, effectively dismantling the remains of Grissom's organizations, and unveils the Bat-Signal. Batman leaves the police a note, promising to defend Gotham should crime strike again, and asking them to use the Bat-Signal to summon him in times of need. Alfred takes Vicki to Wayne Manor, explaining that Wayne will be a little late. She responds that she is not surprised, as Batman looks at the signal's projection from a rooftop, standing watch over the city.

== Cast ==
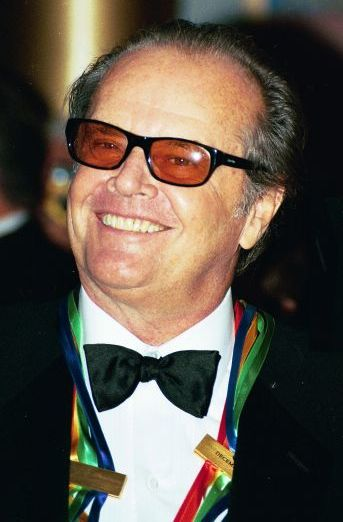
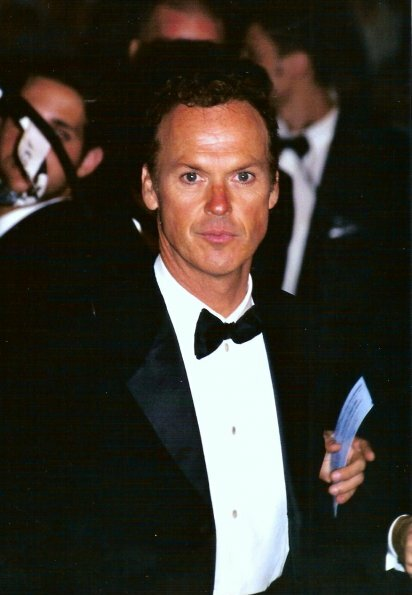
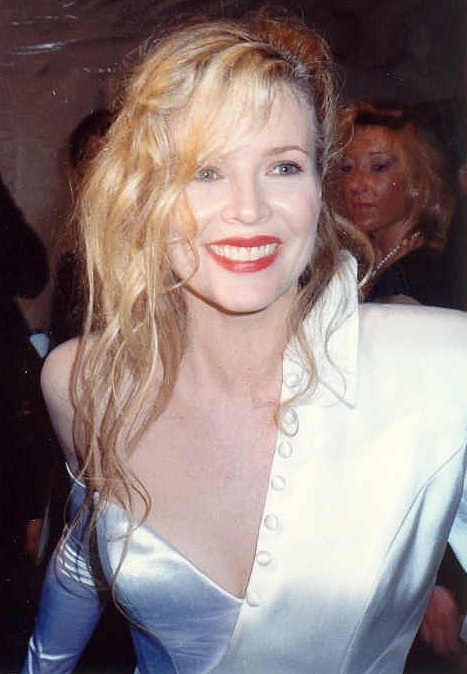
Jack Nicholson (in 2001), Michael Keaton (in 2002), and Kim Basinger (in 1990).
- Jack Nicholson as Jack Napier / The Joker
  - Hugo E. Blick as young Jack Napier
- Michael Keaton as Bruce Wayne / Batman
  - Charles Roskilly as young Bruce Wayne
- Kim Basinger as Vicki Vale
- Robert Wuhl as Alexander Knox
- Pat Hingle as Commissioner Gordon
- Billy Dee Williams as Harvey Dent
- Michael Gough as Alfred Pennyworth
- Jack Palance as Carl Grissom
- Jerry Hall as Alicia Hunt
- Tracey Walter as Bob the Goon
- Lee Wallace as Mayor Borg
- William Hootkins as Lt. Max Eckhardt
- Liza Ross as tourist mom
- Garrick Hagon as tourist dad
- Adrian Meyers as tourist son
- David Baxt as Thomas Wayne
- Sharon Holm as Martha Wayne

== Production ==
=== Development ===
"I was never a giant comic book fan, but I've always loved the image of Batman and the Joker. The reason I've never been a comic book fan – and I think it started when I was a child – is because I could never tell which box I was supposed to read. I don't know if it was dyslexia or whatever, but that's why I loved The Killing Joke, because for the first time I could tell which one to read. It's my favorite. It's the first comic I've ever loved. And the success of those graphic novels made our ideas more acceptable."

— Tim Burton

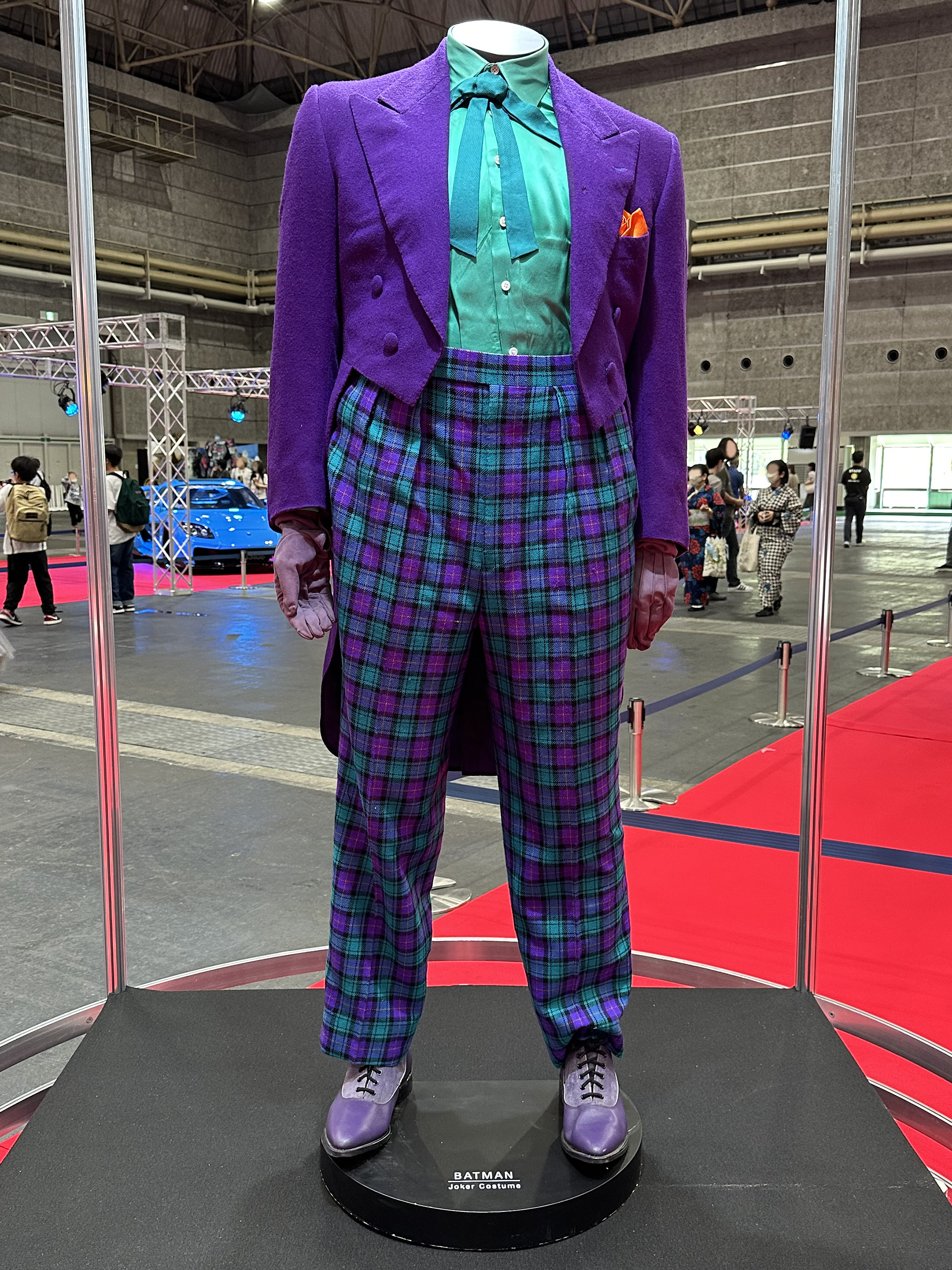
The costume worn by Jack Nicholson in the film

In the late 1970s, Batman's popularity was waning. CBS was interested in producing a Batman in Outer Space film. Producers Benjamin Melniker and Michael E. Uslan purchased the film rights of Batman from DC Comics on October 3, 1979. It was Uslan's wish "to make the definitive, dark, serious version of Batman, the way Bob Kane and Bill Finger had envisioned him in 1939. A creature of the night; stalking criminals in the shadows." Richard Maibaum was approached to write a script with Guy Hamilton to direct, but the two turned down the offer. Uslan was unsuccessful with pitching Batman to various movie studios because they wanted the film to be similar to the campy 1960s television series. Columbia Pictures and United Artists were among those to turn down the film.

A disappointed Uslan then wrote a script titled Return of the Batman to give the film industry a better idea of his vision for the film. Uslan later compared its dark tone to that of the successful four-part comic book The Dark Knight Returns, which his script predated by six years. In November 1979, producers Jon Peters and Peter Guber joined the project. Melniker and Uslan became executive producers. The four felt it was best to pattern the film's development after that of Superman (1978). Uslan, Melniker and Guber pitched Batman to Universal Pictures, but the studio turned it down. Though no movie studios were yet involved, the project was publicly announced with a budget of $15 million in July 1980 at the Comic Art Convention in New York. Warner Bros., the studio behind the successful Superman film franchise, decided to also accept and produce Batman.

Tom Mankiewicz completed a script titled The Batman in June 1983, focusing on Batman and Dick Grayson's origins, with the Joker and Rupert Thorne as villains and Silver St. Cloud as the romantic interest. Mankiewicz took inspiration from the limited series Batman: Strange Apparitions, written by Steve Englehart. Comic book artist Marshall Rogers, who worked with Englehart on Strange Apparitions, was hired for concept art. The Batman was then announced in late 1983 for a mid-1985 release date on a budget of $20 million. Originally, Mankiewicz had wanted an unknown actor for Batman, William Holden for James Gordon, David Niven as Alfred Pennyworth, and Peter O'Toole as the Penguin, whom Mankiewicz wanted to portray as a mobster with low body temperature. Warner Bros. considered several A-listers for the role of Batman, including James Caan and Dustin Hoffman. Holden died in 1981 and Niven in 1983, so this would never come to pass. A number of filmmakers were attached to Mankiewicz' script, including Ivan Reitman and Joe Dante. Reitman wanted to cast Bill Murray as Batman and Eddie Murphy as Robin, and Dante wanted to cast John Lithgow as the Joker. Nine rewrites were performed by nine separate writers. Most of them were based on Strange Apparitions. However, Mankiewicz's script was still being used to guide the project. Due to the work they did together with the film Swamp Thing (1982), Wes Craven was among the names that Melniker and Uslan considered while looking for a director. Richard Rush was also considered. Sam Raimi wanted to direct, but was unable to get the rights.

After the financial success of Pee-wee's Big Adventure (1985), Warner Bros. hired Tim Burton to direct Batman. Burton had then-girlfriend Julie Hickson write a new 30-page film treatment, feeling the previous script by Mankiewicz was campy. The success of The Dark Knight Returns and the graphic novel Batman: The Killing Joke rekindled Warner Bros.' interest in a film adaptation. Burton was initially not a comic book fan, but he was impressed by the dark and serious tone found in both The Dark Knight Returns and The Killing Joke. Warner Bros. enlisted the aid of Englehart to write a new treatment in March 1986. Like Mankiewicz's script, it was based on his own Strange Apparitions and included Silver St. Cloud, Dick Grayson, the Joker, and Rupert Thorne, as well as a cameo appearance by the Penguin. Warner Bros. was impressed, but Englehart felt there were too many characters. He removed the Penguin and Dick Grayson in his second treatment, finishing in May 1986.

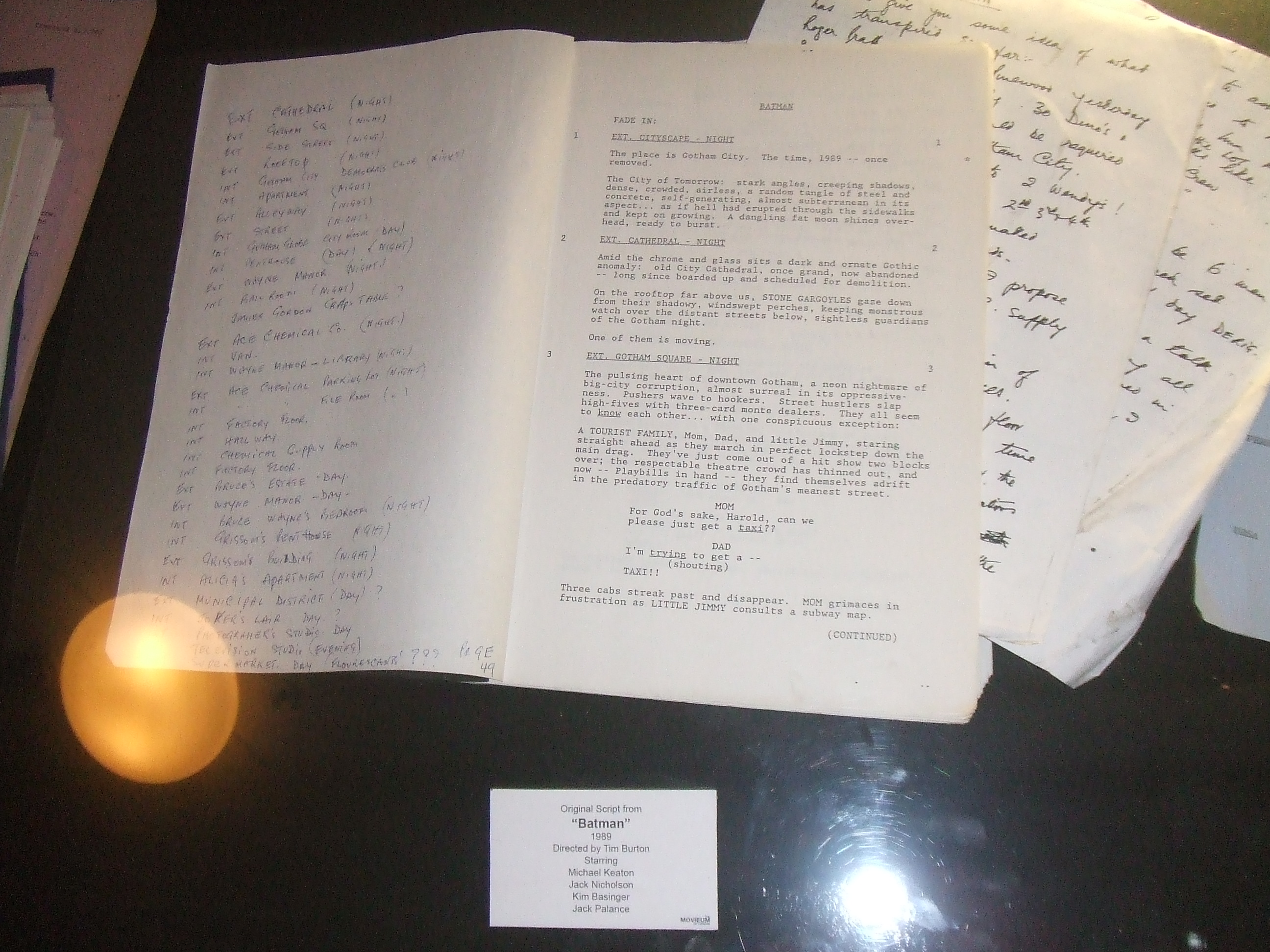
Sam Hamm's script in London Film Museum.

Burton approached Sam Hamm, a comic book fan, to write the screenplay. Hamm decided not to use an origin story, feeling that flashbacks would be more suitable and that "unlocking the mystery" would become part of the storyline. He reasoned, "You totally destroy your credibility if you show the literal process by which Bruce Wayne becomes Batman." Hamm replaced Silver St. Cloud with Vicki Vale and Rupert Thorne with his own creation, Carl Grissom. He completed his script in October 1986, which demoted Dick Grayson to a cameo rather than a supporting character. One scene in Hamm's script had a young James Gordon on duty the night of the murder of Bruce Wayne's parents. When Hamm's script was rewritten, the scene was deleted, reducing it to a photo in the Gotham Globe newspaper seen in the film.

Warner Bros. was less willing to move forward on development, despite their enthusiasm for Hamm's script, which Kane greeted with positive feedback. Hamm's script was then bootlegged at various comic book stores in the United States. Batman was finally given the greenlight to commence pre-production in April 1988, after the success of Burton's Beetlejuice the same year. When comic book fans found out about Burton directing the film with Michael Keaton starring in the lead role, controversy arose over the tone and direction Batman was going in. Hamm explained, "They hear Tim Burton's name and they think of Pee-wee's Big Adventure. They hear Keaton's name, and they think of any number of Michael Keaton comedies. You think of the 1960s version of Batman, and it was the complete opposite of our film. We tried to market it with a typical dark and serious tone, but the fans didn't believe us." To combat negative reports on the film's production, Kane was hired as creative consultant. Batman's co-creator, Bill Finger, was uncredited at the time of the film's release and his name was not added to any Batman-related media until 2016.

=== Casting ===
Michael Keaton as Batman and Jack Nicholson as the Joker in the film's climactic confrontation

Parallel to the Superman casting, a variety of Hollywood A-listers were considered for the role of Batman, including Mel Gibson, Michael Biehn, Steven Seagal, Kevin Costner, Charlie Sheen, Tom Selleck, Bill Murray, Harrison Ford and Dennis Quaid. Burton was pressured by Warner Bros. to cast an obvious action movie star, and had approached Pierce Brosnan, but he had no interest in playing a comic book character. Gibson turned down the role in favor of Lethal Weapon 2 (1989). Burton was originally interested in casting an unknown actor, Willem Dafoe, who was falsely reported to be considered for the Joker but had actually been considered for Batman early in development. Producer Jon Peters suggested Michael Keaton, arguing he had the right "edgy, tormented quality" after having seen his dramatic performance in Clean and Sober (1988). Having directed Keaton in Beetlejuice, Burton agreed.

The casting of Keaton caused a furor among comic book fans, with 50,000 protest letters sent to Warner Bros. offices. Kane, Hamm, and Uslan also heavily questioned the casting. "Obviously there was a negative response from the comic book people. I think they thought we were going to make it like the 1960s TV series, and make it campy, because they thought of Michael Keaton from Mr. Mom and Night Shift and stuff like that." Keaton studied The Dark Knight Returns for inspiration.

Tim Curry, David Bowie, Peter O'Toole, John Lithgow, Brad Dourif, Ray Liotta, and James Woods were all considered for the Joker. (Note: Attributed to multiple references:) O'Toole was Uslan's backup choice had Jack Nicholson declined. Lithgow, during his audition, attempted to talk Burton out of casting him, a decision he would later publicly regret, stating, "I didn't realize it was such a big deal." Liotta was scheduled to meet with Burton, but he declined as he felt that the film would be "stupid"; he would later regret the decision. Burton wanted to cast John Glover, but the studio insisted on using a movie star. Robin Williams lobbied hard for the part. Nicholson had been the studio's top choice since 1980. Peters approached Nicholson as far back as 1986, during filming of The Witches of Eastwick; unlike Keaton, he was a popular choice for his role. Nicholson had what was known as an "off-the-clock" agreement. His contract specified the number of hours he was entitled to have off each day, from the time he left the set to the time he reported back for filming, as well as being off for Los Angeles Lakers home games. Nicholson demanded that all of his scenes be shot in a three-week block, but the schedule lapsed into 106 days. He reduced his standard $10 million fee to $6 million in exchange for a cut of the film's earnings (including associated merchandise), which led to remuneration in excess of $50 million—biographer Marc Eliot reports that Nicholson may have received as much as $90 million. He also demanded top billing on promotional materials.

Sean Young was originally cast as Vicki Vale, but was injured in a horse-riding accident prior to commencement of filming. Young's departure necessitated an urgent search for an actress who, besides being right for the part, could commit to the film at very short notice. Peters suggested Kim Basinger: she was able to join the production immediately and was cast. As a fan of Michael Gough's work in various Hammer horror films, Burton cast Gough as Bruce Wayne's mysterious butler, Alfred. Reporter Alexander Knox was portrayed by Robert Wuhl. In the original script, Knox was killed by the Joker's poison gas during the climax, but the filmmakers "liked [my] character so much," Wuhl said, "that they decided to let me live." Burton chose Billy Dee Williams as Harvey Dent because he wanted to include the villain Two-Face in a future film using the concept of an African-American Two-Face for the black and white concept, but Tommy Lee Jones was later cast in the role for Batman Forever (1995), which disappointed Williams. Nicholson convinced the filmmakers to cast his close friend Tracey Walter as the Joker's henchman Bob. Matt Damon auditioned for the role of Dick Grayson, but the role eventually went to Irish child actor Ricky Addison Reed before the character was removed by Warren Skarren for the revised shooting script. The rest of the cast included Pat Hingle as Commissioner Gordon, Jerry Hall as Alicia, Lee Wallace as Mayor Borg, William Hootkins as Lt. Eckhardt, and Jack Palance as crime boss Carl Grissom.

=== Design ===
"On Batman, our vision of Gotham City was influenced by the tone of the 'Dark Knight' comics, and also Andreas Feininger's photographs of New York buildings and the work of Japanese architect Shin Takamatsu. (Blade Runner was consciously avoided as a reference; no one was allowed to watch it while we were designing the film and neon was shunned altogether!)"

— Art director Nigel Phelps

Burton had been impressed with the design of Neil Jordan's The Company of Wolves (1984), but was unable to hire its production designer Anton Furst for Beetlejuice as he had instead committed to Jordan's London-filmed ghost comedy High Spirits (1988), a choice he later regretted. A year later Burton successfully hired Furst for Batman, and they enjoyed working with each other. "I don't think I've ever felt so naturally in tune with a director," Furst said. "Conceptually, spiritually, visually, or artistically. There was never any problem because we never fought over anything. Texture, attitude and feelings are what Burton is a master at."

Furst and the art department deliberately mixed clashing architectural styles to "make Gotham City the ugliest and bleakest metropolis imaginable". Furst continued, "[W]e imagined what New York City might have become without a planning commission. A city run by crime, with a riot of architectural styles. An essay in ugliness. As if hell erupted through the pavement and kept on going". The 1985 film Brazil by Terry Gilliam was also a notable influence upon the film's production design, as both Burton and Furst studied it as a reference. Black and white charcoal drawings of key locations and sets were created by Furst's longtime draftsman, Nigel Phelps. Derek Meddings served as the visual effects supervisor, overseeing the miniatures and animation. Conceptual illustrator Julian Caldow designed the Batmobile, Batwing and assorted bat-gadgets that were later constructed by prop builder John Evans. Keith Short sculpted the final body of the Batmobile, adding two Browning machine guns. On designing the Batmobile, Furst explained, "We looked at jet aircraft components, we looked at war machines, we looked at all sorts of things. In the end, we went into pure expressionism, taking the Salt Flat Racers of the 30s and the Sting Ray macho machines of the 50s". The car was built upon a Chevrolet Impala when previous development with a Jaguar and Ford Mustang failed. The car itself was later purchased by standup comedian/ventriloquist Jeff Dunham, who had it outfitted with a Corvette engine to make it street legal.

Nicholson's makeup appliances were sculpted and applied by Nick Dudman

Costume designer Bob Ringwood turned down the chance to work on Licence to Kill (1989) in favor of Batman. Ringwood found it difficult designing the Batsuit because "the image of Batman in the comics is this huge, big six-foot-four hunk with a dimpled chin. Michael Keaton is a guy with average build", he stated. "The problem was to make somebody who was average-sized and ordinary-looking into this bigger-than-life creature." Burton commented, "Michael is a bit claustrophobic, which made it worse for him. The costume put him in a dark, Batman-like mood though, so he was able to use it to his advantage". Burton's idea was to use an all-black suit, and was met with positive feedback by Bob Kane. Vin Burnham was tasked with sculpting the Batsuit, in association with Alli Eynon. Jon Peters wanted to use a Nike product placement with the Batsuit. Ringwood studied over 200 comic book issues for inspiration. 28 sculpted latex designs were created; 25 different cape looks and 6 different heads were made, accumulating a total cost of $250,000. Comic book fans initially expressed negative feedback against the Batsuit. Burton opted not to use tights, spandex, or underpants as seen in the comic book, feeling it was not intimidating. Prosthetic makeup designer Nick Dudman used acrylic-based makeup paint called PAX for Nicholson's chalk-white face. Part of Nicholson's contract was approval over the makeup designer.

=== Filming ===
The filmmakers considered filming Batman entirely on the Warner Bros. backlot in Burbank, California, but media interest in the film made them change the location. It was shot at Pinewood Studios in England from October 10, 1988, to February 14, 1989, with 80 days of main shooting and 86 days of second unit shooting. 18 sound stages were used, with seven stages occupied, including the 51 acre backlot for the Gotham City set, one of the biggest ever built at the studio. Locations included Knebworth House and Hatfield House doubling for Wayne Manor, plus Acton Lane Power Station and Little Barford Power Station. For the production at Acton Lane Power Station, the power plant and alien nest sets from Aliens (1986) were reused as interiors for Axis Chemicals. The original production budget escalated from $30 million to $48 million.

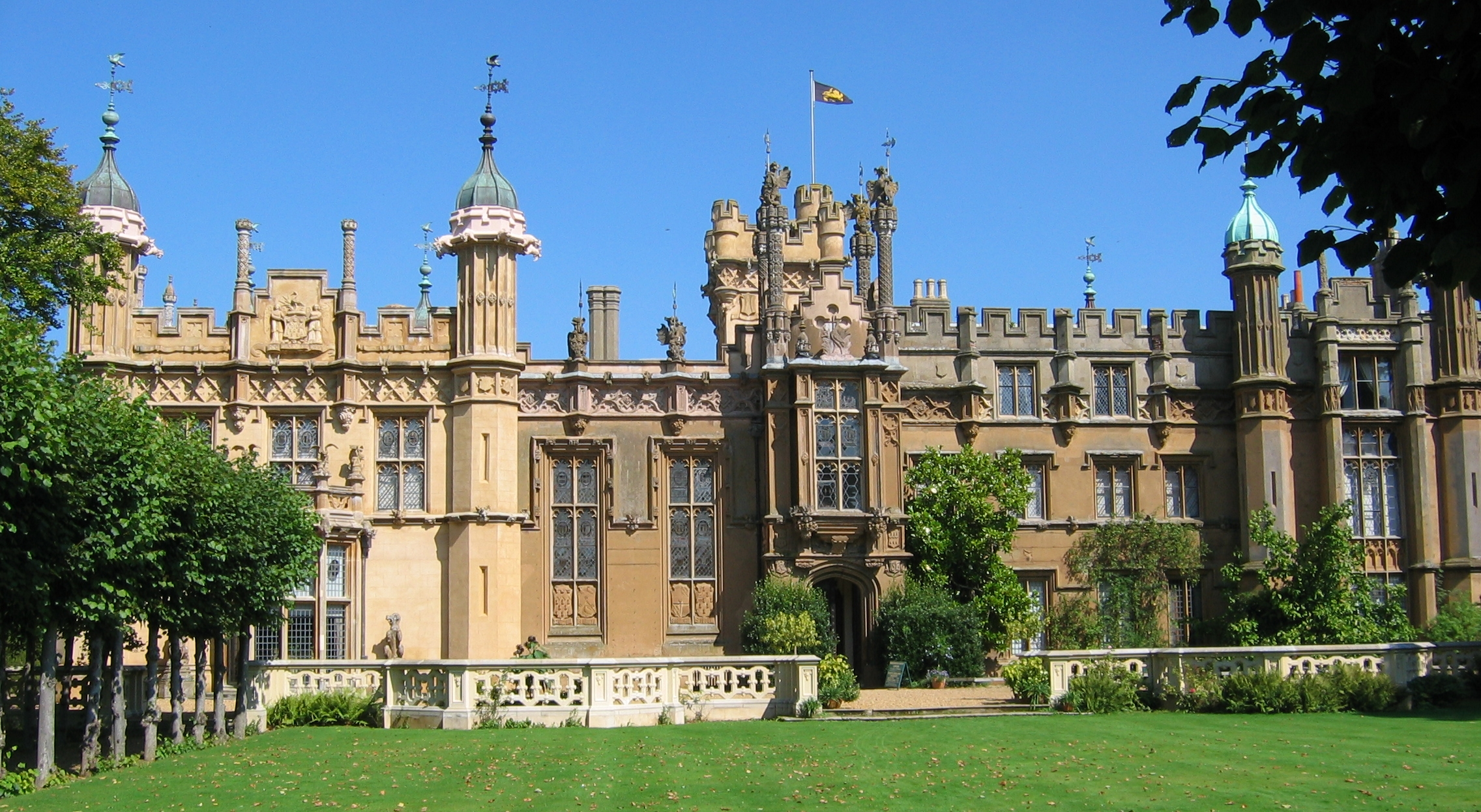
Knebworth House served as Wayne Manor in the film.

Filming was highly secretive. The unit publicist was offered and refused £10,000 for the first pictures of Nicholson as the Joker. The police were later called in when two reels of footage (about 20 minutes' worth) were stolen. With various problems during filming, Burton called it "Torture. The worst period of my life!"

Hamm was not allowed to perform rewrites during the 1988 Writers Guild of America strike. Warren Skaaren, who had also worked on Burton's Beetlejuice, did rewrites. Jonathan Gems and Charles McKeown rewrote the script during filming. Only Skaaren received screenplay credit with Hamm. Hamm criticized the rewrites, but blamed the changes on Warner Bros. Burton explained, "I don't understand why that became such a problem. We started out with a script that everyone liked, although we recognized it needed a little work." Dick Grayson appeared in the shooting script but was deleted because the filmmakers felt he was irrelevant to the plot; Kane supported this decision.

Keaton used his comedic experience for scenes such as Bruce and Vicki's Wayne Manor dinner. He called himself a "logic freak" and was concerned that Batman's secret identity would in reality be fairly easy to uncover. Keaton discussed ideas with Burton to better disguise the character, including the use of contact lenses. Ultimately, Keaton decided to perform Batman's voice at a lower register than when he was portraying Bruce Wayne, which became a hallmark of the film version of the character, with Christian Bale later using the same technique.

Originally in the climax, the Joker was meant to kill Vicki Vale, sending Batman into a vengeful fury. Jon Peters reworked the climax without telling Burton and commissioned production designer Anton Furst to create a 38-foot (12 m) model of the cathedral. This cost $100,000 when the film was already well over budget. Burton disliked the idea, having no clue how the scene would end: "Here were Jack Nicholson and Kim Basinger walking up this cathedral, and halfway up Jack turns around and says, 'Why am I walking up all these stairs? Where am I going?' 'We'll talk about it when you get to the top!' I had to tell him that I didn't know."

=== Music ===
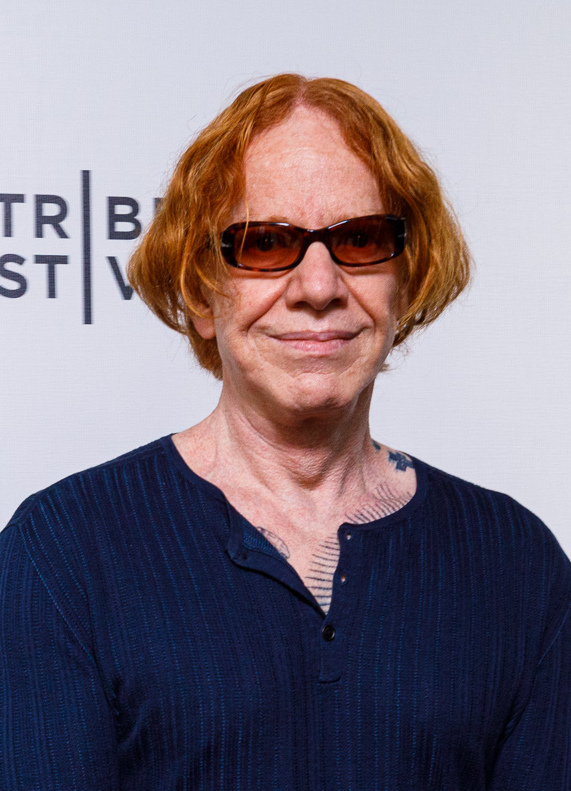
Composer Danny Elfman in 2022.

Burton hired Danny Elfman of Oingo Boingo, his collaborator on Pee-wee's Big Adventure and Beetlejuice, to compose the music score. For inspiration, Elfman was given The Dark Knight Returns. Elfman was worried, as he had never worked on a production this large in budget and scale. In addition, producer Jon Peters was skeptical of hiring Elfman, but was later convinced when he heard the opening number. Peters and Peter Guber wanted Prince to write music for the Joker and Michael Jackson to do the romance songs. Elfman would then combine the style of Prince and Jackson's songs together for the entire film score. At the encouragement of Prince's then-manager Albert Magnoli, it was agreed that Prince himself would write and sing the film's songs.

Burton protested the ideas, citing "my movies aren't commercial like Top Gun." Elfman enlisted the help of composer Shirley Walker and Oingo Boingo lead guitarist Steve Bartek to arrange the compositions for the orchestra. Elfman was later displeased with the audio mixing of his film score. "Batman was done in England by technicians who didn't care, and the non-caring showed," he stated. "I'm not putting down England because they've done gorgeous dubs there, but this particular crew elected not to." Batman was one of the first films to spawn two soundtracks. One of them featured songs written by Prince while the other showcased Elfman's score. Both were successful, and compilations of Elfman's opening credits were used in the title sequence theme for Batman: The Animated Series (1992–1995), also composed by Walker.

== Themes ==
When discussing the central theme of Batman, director Tim Burton explained, "the whole film and mythology of the character is a complete duel of the freaks. It's a fight between two disturbed people", adding, "The Joker is such a great character because there's a complete freedom to him. Any character who operates on the outside of society and is deemed a freak and an outcast then has the freedom to do what they want... They are the darker sides of freedom. Insanity is in some scary way the most freedom you can have, because you're not bound by the laws of society".

Burton saw Bruce Wayne as the bearer of a double identity, exposing one while hiding the reality from the world. Burton biographer Ken Hanke wrote that Bruce Wayne, struggling with his alter-ego as Batman, is depicted as an antihero. Hanke felt that Batman has to push the boundaries of civil justice to deal with certain criminals, such as the Joker. Kim Newman theorized that "Burton and the writers saw Batman and the Joker as a dramatic antithesis, and the film deals with their intertwined origins and fates to an even greater extent".

Batman conveys trademarks found in 1930s pulp magazines, notably the design of Gotham City stylized with Art Deco design. Richard Corliss, writing for Time, observed that Gotham's design was a reference to films such as The Cabinet of Dr. Caligari (1920) and Metropolis (1927). "Gotham City, despite being shot on a studio backlot", he continued, "is literally another character in the script. It has the demeaning presence of German Expressionism and fascist architecture, staring down at the citizens." Hanke further addressed the notions of Batman being a period piece, in that "The citizens, cops, people and the black-and-white television looks like it takes place in 1939"; but later said: "Had the filmmakers made Vicki Vale a femme fatale rather than a damsel in distress, this could have made Batman as a homage and tribute to classic film noir." Portions of the climax pay homage to Vertigo (1958).

== Marketing ==
The B.D. Fox ad agency created hundreds of unused logos and posters for promotion, many by John Alvin. In the end Burton and producers decided on only using a gold and black logo that Julian Caldow had sketched in the art department. The final logo was airbrushed by Bill Garland, with no other key art variation, to keep an air of mystery about the film. The logo is also an ambiguous image, which can be read either as Batman's symbol or as a gaping mouth. Earlier designs "had the word 'Batman' spelled in RoboCop or Conan the Barbarian-type font". Jon Peters unified all the film's tie-ins, even turning down $6 million from General Motors to build the Batmobile because the car company would not relinquish creative control.

During production, Peters read in The Wall Street Journal that comic book fans were unsatisfied with the casting of Michael Keaton. In response, Peters rushed the first film trailer that played in thousands of theaters during Christmas. It was simply an assemblage of scenes without music, but created enormous anticipation for the film, with audiences clapping and cheering. DC Comics allowed screenwriter Sam Hamm to write his own comic book miniseries. Hamm's stories were collected in the graphic novel Batman: Blind Justice (ISBN 978-1563890475). Denys Cowan and Dick Giordano illustrated the artwork. Blind Justice tells the story of Bruce Wayne trying to solve a series of murders connected to WayneTech. It also marks the first appearance of Henri Ducard, who was later used in the rebooted Batman Begins (2005), albeit as an alias for the more notable Ra's al Ghul.

In the months leading up to Batman's release in June 1989, a popular culture phenomenon known as "Batmania" began. Over $750 million worth of merchandise was sold. Cult filmmaker and comic book writer Kevin Smith remembered: "That summer was huge. You couldn't turn around without seeing the Bat-Signal somewhere. People were cutting it into their fucking heads. It was just the summer of Batman and if you were a comic book fan it was pretty hot." Hachette Book Group USA published a novelization, Batman, written by Craig Shaw Gardner. It remained on The New York Times Best Seller list throughout June 1989. Burton admitted he was annoyed by the publicity. David Handelman of The New York Observer categorized Batman as a high concept film. He believed "it is less movie than a corporate behemoth".

== Reception ==
=== Box office ===
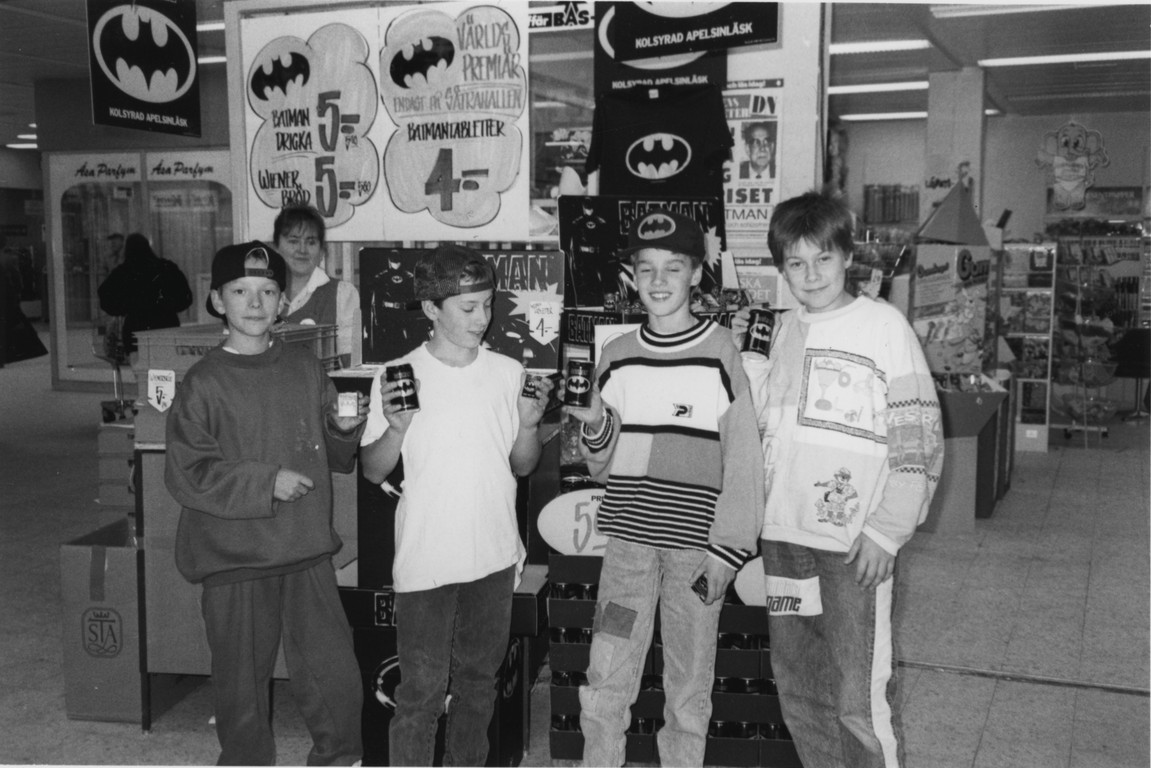
Boys with Batman movie merchandise at the premiere of the Movie in Gävle, Sweden in 1989.

Batman grossed $2.2 million in late night previews on June 22, 1989, on 1,215 screens and $40.49 million in 2,194 theaters during its opening weekend. This broke the opening weekend records held by Indiana Jones and the Last Crusade (which had a 4-day Memorial Day weekend gross of $37.0 million the previous month) and Ghostbusters II (which had a $29.4 million 3-day weekend the previous weekend). Upon opening, the film would go on to reach the number one spot above Honey, I Shrunk the Kids. Additionally, it had the largest opening weekend for a Jack Nicholson film for 14 years until it was dethroned by Anger Management in 2003. Batman also set a record for a second weekend gross with $30 million (also the second biggest 3-day weekend of all time) and became the fastest film to earn $100 million, reaching it in 11 days (10 days plus late night previews). The film closed on December 14, 1989, with a final gross of $251.4 million in North America and $160.2 million internationally, totaling $411.6 million. The film would hold the record for being the highest-grossing Warner Bros. film until 1996 when Twister surpassed it. It was the highest-grossing film based on a DC comic book until The Dark Knight (2008). Furthermore, Batman held the record for being the highest-grossing superhero film of all time until it was taken by Spider-Man in 2002. The film's gross is the 143rd highest ever in North American ranks. Although Indiana Jones and the Last Crusade made the most money worldwide in 1989, Batman was able to beat The Last Crusade in North America, and made a further $150 million in home video sales. Box Office Mojo estimates that the film sold more than 60 million tickets in the US.

Despite the film's box office – over $400 million against a budget of no more than $48 million – Warner Bros. claimed it ended up losing $35.8 million and "not likely to ever show a profit," which has been attributed to a case of Hollywood accounting.

=== Critical response ===
Batman was criticized by some for being too dark, but nonetheless received a generally positive response from critics. On review aggregator Rotten Tomatoes, the film holds an approval rating of 77%, based on 143 reviews, with an average rating of 7.2/10. The website's critics consensus reads: "An eerie, haunting spectacle, Batman succeeds as dark entertainment, even if Jack Nicholson's Joker too often overshadows the title character." On Metacritic, the film received a weighted average score of 69 out of 100, based on 21 reviews, indicating "generally favorable" reviews. Audiences polled by CinemaScore gave the film an average grade of "A" on an A+ to F scale.

Many observed that Burton was more interested in the Joker and the art and set production design than Batman or anything else in terms of characterization and screentime. Comic book fans reacted negatively over the Joker murdering Thomas and Martha Wayne; in the comic book, Joe Chill is responsible. Writer Sam Hamm said it was Burton's idea to have the Joker murder Wayne's parents. "The Writer's Strike was going on, and Tim had the other writers do that. I also hold innocent to Alfred letting Vicki Vale into the Batcave. Fans were ticked off with that, and I agree. That would have been Alfred's last day of employment at Wayne Manor," Hamm said.

The songs written by Prince were criticized for being "too out of place". While Burton stated he had no problem with the Prince songs, he was less enthusiastic with their use in the film. On the film, Burton remarked, "I liked parts of it, but the whole movie is mainly boring to me. It's OK, but it was more of a cultural phenomenon than a great movie."

Despite initial negative reactions from comics fans prior to the film's release, Keaton's portrayal of Batman was generally praised. James Berardinelli called the film entertaining, with the highlight being the production design. However, he concluded, "the best thing that can be said about Batman is that it led to Batman Returns, which was a far superior effort." Variety felt "Jack Nicholson stole every scene" but still greeted the film with positive feedback. Roger Ebert was highly impressed with the production design, but claimed "Batman is a triumph of design over story, style over substance, a great-looking movie with a plot you can't care much about." He also called the film "a depressing experience". On the syndicated television series Siskel & Ebert, his reviewing partner Gene Siskel disagreed, describing the film as having a "refreshingly adult" approach with performances, direction and set design that "draws you into a psychological world".

== Legacy ==
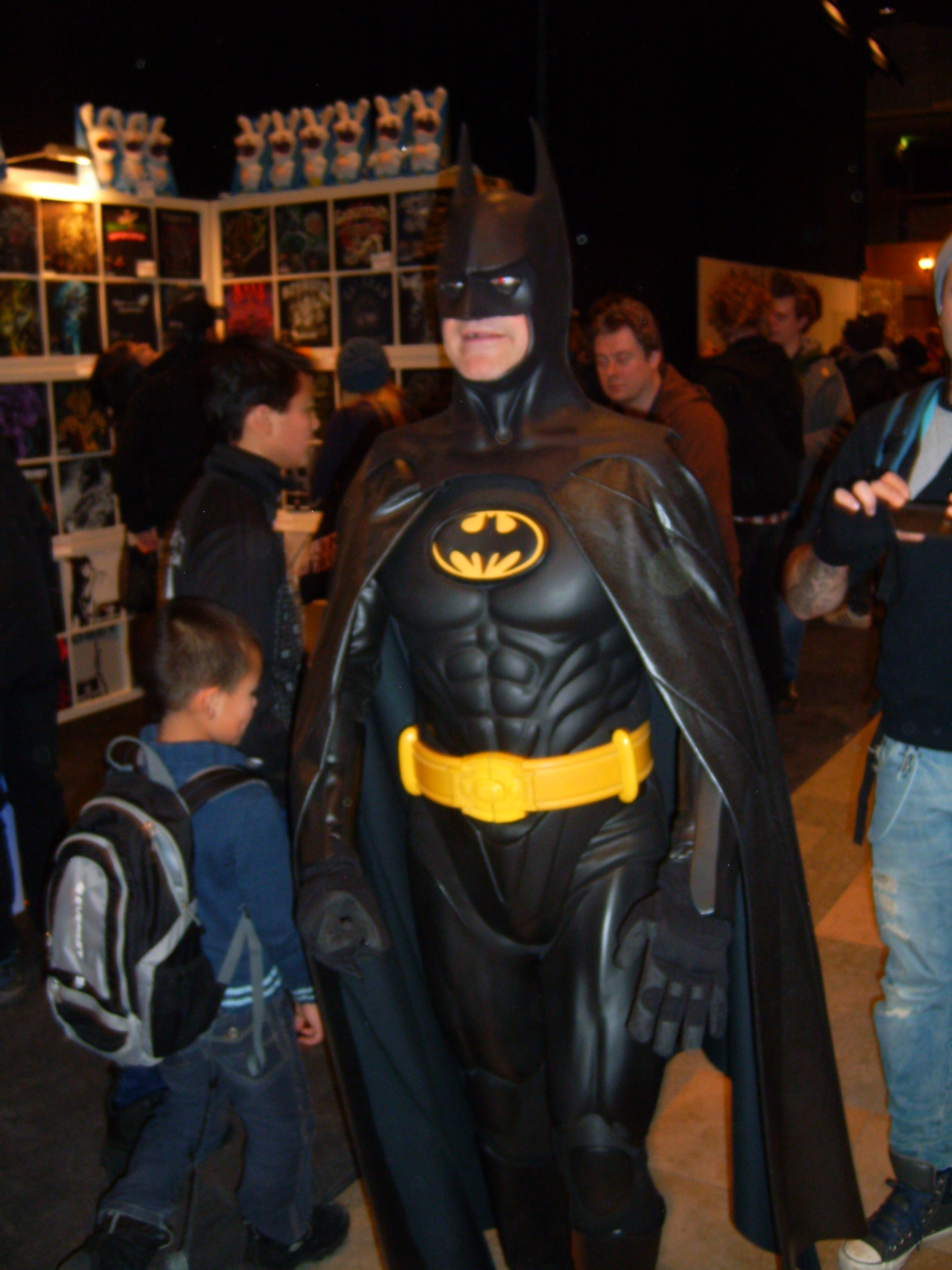
A cosplayer dressed as Batman.

Anton Furst and Peter Young won the Academy Award for Best Art Direction, while Nicholson was nominated for the Golden Globe Award for Best Actor (Musical or Comedy). The British Academy of Film and Television Arts nominated Batman in six categories (Production Design, Visual Effects, Costume Design, Makeup, Sound and Actor in a Supporting Role for Nicholson), but it won none of the categories. Nicholson, Basinger, the makeup department, and costume designer Bob Ringwood all received nominations at the Saturn Awards. The film was also nominated for the Saturn Award for Best Fantasy Film and the Hugo Award for Best Dramatic Presentation.

The success of Batman prompted Warner Bros. Animation to create the acclaimed Batman: The Animated Series, as a result beginning the long-running DC Animated Universe and helped establish the modern-day superhero film genre. Series co-creator Bruce Timm stated the television show's Art Deco design was inspired from the film. Timm commented, "our show would never have gotten made if it hadn't been for that first Batman movie." Burton joked, "ever since I did Batman, it was like the first dark comic book movie. Now everyone wants to do a dark and serious superhero movie. I guess I'm the one responsible for that trend."

Batman initiated the original Batman film series and spawned three sequels: Batman Returns (1992), Batman Forever (1995), and Batman & Robin (1997), the latter two of which were directed by Joel Schumacher instead of Burton and replaced Keaton as Batman with Val Kilmer and George Clooney, respectively.

Executive producers Benjamin Melniker and Michael E. Uslan filed a breach of contract lawsuit in Los Angeles County Superior Court on March 26, 1992. Melniker and Uslan claimed to be "the victims of a sinister campaign of fraud and coercion that has cheated them out of continuing involvement in the production of Batman and its sequels. We were denied proper credits, and deprived of any financial rewards for our indispensable creative contribution to the success of Batman." A superior court judge rejected the lawsuit. Total revenues of Batman have topped $2 billion, with Uslan claiming to have "not seen a penny more than that since our net profit participation has proved worthless." Warner Bros. offered the pair an out-of-court settlement, a sum described by Melniker and Uslan's attorney as "two popcorns and two Cokes".

Reflecting on the twentieth anniversary of its release in a retrospective article on Salon.com, film commentator Scott Mendelson noted the continuing influence that Batman has had on the motion film industry, including the increasing importance of opening weekend box office receipts; the narrowing window between a film's debut and its video release that caused the demise of second-run movie theaters; the accelerated acquisition of pre-existing, pre-sold properties for film adaptations that can be readily leveraged for merchandizing tie-ins; the primacy of the MPAA PG-13 as the target rating for film producers; and more off-beat, non-traditional casting opportunities for genre films. The film was responsible for the British Board of Film Classification introducing its "12" age rating, as its content fell between what was expected for a "PG" or "15" certificate.

The American Film Institute anointed Batman the 46th greatest movie hero and the Joker the 45th greatest movie villain on AFI's 100 Years...100 Heroes and Villains.

American Film Institute lists

- AFI's 100 Years...100 Movies – Nominated
- AFI's 100 Years...100 Thrills – Nominated
- AFI's 100 Years...100 Heroes and Villains:
  - The Joker – #45 Villain
  - Batman – #46 Hero
- AFI's 100 Years...100 Movie Quotes:
  - "Have you ever danced with the Devil in the pale moonlight?" – Nominated
- AFI's 100 Years of Film Scores – Nominated
- AFI's 10 Top 10 – Nominated Fantasy Film

Robert Wuhl reprises his role as Alexander Knox in The CW's Arrowverse crossover, Crisis on Infinite Earths. The event also retroactively established that the world of the film and its sequel, Batman Returns, takes place on Earth-89; which is one of the worlds destroyed by the Anti-Monitor (LaMonica Garrett) during the Crisis. Michael Keaton reprises his role as Batman in The Flash set in the DC Extended Universe.

=== Video games ===
Several video games based on the film were released: By Ocean Software in 1989, by Sunsoft in 1989 and 1990, and by Atari Games in 1991. Konami was also in talks of releasing an arcade game around the same time as Atari.

=== Comic book continuations ===
In March 2016, artist Joe Quinones revealed several art designs he and Kate Leth had created to pitch a comic book continuation set in the 1989 Batman universe to DC Comics. The pitch, which was rejected, would have included the story of Billy Dee Williams' Harvey Dent turning into Two-Face as well as the inclusion of characters such as Batgirl in a story that took place following the events of Batman Returns. In 2021, DC announced it would be releasing a comic book continuation of the film titled Batman '89. The series would be written by Sam Hamm and illustrated by Joe Quinones. The comic's synopsis revealed that it would include the return of Selina Kyle/Catwoman, an introduction of a new Robin, and the transformation of Williams' Harvey Dent into Two-Face.

A follow-up series was later announced by DC Comics on August 17, 2023. The first issue of the new series was released on November 28, 2023. It was written again by Sam Hamm, with art by Joe Quinones. In the series, Batman has mysteriously disappeared after Dent's death, leading Gotham citizens to take to the streets to fight in his place, including Barbara Gordon, who becomes Batgirl. Scarecrow and Harley Quinn will be featured as the main antagonists, seemingly referencing the unproduced fifth film in the Burton and Schumacher series, Batman Unchained.

=== Direct sequel novels ===
On April 11, 2024, it was announced that a new novel would be released which would tie-in to the film. Announced with the title Batman: Resurrection, the novel was written by author John Jackson Miller, and acts as a direct sequel to the film, being set between the events of Batman and its sequel Batman Returns, with Batman focusing on dismantling the remnants of Joker's organization, while contemplating on the idea that Joker might not actually be dead. The novel also includes certain characters introduced in the sequel, with one example being Max Shreck. It was released on October 15, 2024, by Penguin Random House; a sequel, titled Batman: Revolution, was later revealed by Miller and was released in October 2025.

=== Home media ===
Batman has been released on various formats, including VHS, LaserDisc, DVD and Blu-ray. In an unprecedented move at the time, it was made available to buy on VHS in the United States on November 15, 1989, less than six months after its theatrical release, at a suggested retail price of only $24.95 although most sellers sold it for less. It was first released on DVD on March 25, 1997, as a double sided disc containing both Widescreen (1.85:1) and Full Screen (1.33:1) versions of the film. The 2005 Batman: The Motion Picture Anthology 1989–1997 included 2-disc special edition DVDs of the film and all three of its sequels. The anthology was also released as a 4-disc Blu-ray set in 2009, with each film and its previous extras contained on a single disc. Other Blu-ray reissues include a "30th Anniversary" Digibook with 50-page booklet, and a steelcase edition; both also include a Digital Copy. Most recently the "25th Anniversary" Diamond Luxe reissue contained the same disc as before and on a second disc, a new 25-minute featurette: "Batman: The Birth of the Modern Blockbuster".

The film was also included in The Tim Burton Collection DVD and Blu-ray set in 2012, alongside its first sequel, Batman Returns.

Batman was released on 4K Ultra HD Blu-ray on June 4, 2019.
