= Swamp Thing (1990 TV series) =

American science fiction television series (1990–1993)

- Genre: Superhero
- Based on: Swamp Thing by: Len Wein; Bernie Wrightson
- Developed by: Joseph Stefano
- Starring: Mark Lindsay Chapman; Carrell Myers (Seasons 1–2); Scott Garrison; Kari Wuhrer (Season 2); Kevin Quigley; Dick Durock
- Composer: Christopher L. Stone
- Country of origin: United States
- No. of seasons: 3
- No. of episodes: 72 (list of episodes)

Production
- Executive producers: Tom Blomquist; Boris Malden; Tom Greene; Benjamin Melniker; Jeff Myrow; Andy Heyward; Steven L. Sears; Joseph Stefano; Michael E. Uslan
- Running time: 30 minutes
- Production companies: Batfilm Productions, Inc.; BBK Productions, Inc.; MCA Television Entertainment; DIC Entertainment

Original release
- Network: USA Network
- Release: July 27, 1990 – May 1, 1993

Swamp Thing is an American superhero television series based on the DC Comics character Swamp Thing. It debuted on USA Network on July 27, 1990, and lasted three seasons for a total of 72 episodes. It was later shown in reruns on the Sci Fi Channel.

== Overview ==
The series was developed for television by Joseph Stefano (known for the film Psycho and The Outer Limits TV series). Actor/stuntman Dick Durock, who played Swamp Thing in both films, reprised his role for the more serious-toned TV series (with Lonnie R. Smith Jr. and Patrick Neil Quinn portraying Alec Holland in flashbacks, etc.). He wore a modified version of Carl Fullerton and Neal Martz's latex suit created for The Return of Swamp Thing, and he spoke in an electronically altered basso profundo. Since his profuse sweating caused the lip and eye prosthetics to fall off while shooting the previous films, Durock simply had makeup applied in those areas for his television costume: "In the first feature, it took close to four hours. In the second feature, it took close to two hours. By the time we did the series, which ironically was by far the best makeup and costume, we had it down to about 45 minutes".

Swamp Thing was filmed in the brand-new Universal Studios Florida facilities and soundstages by Universal's MTE division. This was granted to demonstrate the new studio because the series could be produced cheaply and quickly. For the first 13 episodes, the crew shot second-unit footage in actual Florida swamps and returned to the studio for the primary scenes. The swamps, however, not only prevented them from creating favorable lighting, but also required much time to transport people and equipment from the swamp to the studio. They finally decided to use swamp areas then existing on the perimeter of the studio and to build a swamp in the studio which, according to Durock, looked "ten times better than a real swamp".

Swamp Thing debuted with "The Emerald Heart" on Friday, July 27, 1990, in the 10:30pm EST time slot. The show's introductory narration decrees:

The swamp is my world. It is who I am; it is what I am. I was once a man. I know the evil men do. Do not bring your evil here, I warn you. Beware the wrath of Swamp Thing.

After the pilot episode and first 12 episodes, executive producer Stefano left the series and production was temporarily halted for some retooling by Tom Greene, the new executive producer. By the end of the first season, the network and studio sensed that the show could attract even higher ratings, and further modifications came when Tom Blomquist was enlisted as a replacement for Greene to revamp the series for two more seasons and a lengthy production order of 50 episodes. Those episodes, which helped make Swamp Thing the highest-rated original series on USA Network, were less dependent on elements from the comic books and instead introduced anthological science fiction stories featuring guest-star characters encountering the mysteries of the swamp. Swamp Thing regularly featured guest actors, such as Roscoe Lee Browne as Duchamp (a Voodoo houngan/bokor, who refers to Swamp Thing as "Loa of Green Things" or the "Spirit of the Swamp"), Tyne Daly as Arcane's rival Carla Jeffries, Wolfman Jack as a carnival owner, Debby Boone as the estranged daughter of a beloved local woman, Philip Michael Thomas as a ghost trapped for eternity with his bickering wife, Andrew Stevens as a politician, One Life to Live stars Robert S. Woods and John Loprieno as escaped convicts, Summer Phoenix as a local friend of Jim's, and Adam Curry as a rock star. Two episodes also guest-starred professional wrestlers Terry Funk, Kevin Nash, and Jorge Gonzáles (El Gigante}. Also, returning from the 1982 film, actor Ray Wise, who portrayed Alec Holland-pre-metamorphosis, appears in the third-season episode, "Never Alone", as a man who thinks that Swamp Thing and he are both aliens.

The series also introduced characters such as the Kipp family, as well as a completely new incarnation of Anton Arcane played by Mark Lindsay Chapman. A young boy named Jim Kipp, played by Jess Ziegler, was intended to appeal to the young audience, but after the first 12 episodes, a decision was made to return the series to a darker tone seen in the original Swamp Thing film. Consequently, the story had Jim Kipp abducted by a South American child-stealing ring acting under Arcane's orders, and Jim never appeared again in the series. Durock noted: "The way they wrote him out was kind of a shock to me and everybody else except for, I suppose, the writers... That's a hell of a way to meet your demise!" Indeed, the Swamp Thing evolved as it went along. Regarding these shifts, Durock commented: "I guess we finally got it ironed out with the next 50, we kind of tried to hit a balance".

Jim Kipp's fate and several other unresolved plot points from the first season were resolved by the new writing staff in the second and third seasons. Jim was later said to have been found (off-camera) sometime in the third season by his divorced mother Tressa, played by Carrell Myers, after a long search, and she supposedly sent Jim to live with his father far away. Primary among those plotlines in seasons two and three was Alec Holland's quest to find a cure for the affliction that had turned him into a swamp creature. Several episodes were dedicated to his desire to rediscover his human nature, including his unrequited love story with a beautiful scientist, Dr. Ann Fisk, played by Janet Julian, a former student of his who dedicated herself to helping him. Another innovation in the second and third seasons was an exploration of Dr. Arcane's madness, in an attempt to explain his penchant for evil.

With the network eager to release new episodes, many in the first season were aired out of their original order in the series' original run. The disorganization created the effect of sporadic or unfulfilled plot points in various episodes, an issue that was corrected in the first DVD set. Due to its strong cult following, however, Swamp Thing was later reaired on Sci-Fi Channel and featured during the S.C.I.F.I. World schedule in the early 2000s. As of 2008, the series aired on Chiller in movie form and was available on its official website. The series currently airs on Heroes & Icons, along with many other 1990s syndicated live-action shows, such as Xena: Warrior Princess and Hercules: The Legendary Journeys. It can also be seen on the MeTV network during its "Red Eye Sci-Fi" block every Sunday morning.

== Cast ==
- Mark Lindsay Chapman as Dr. Anton Arcane: A smarmy villain, he attempted to steal Holland's formula and serves as his nemesis.
- Jesse Zeigler as Jim Kipp (season 1, part 1): An 11-year-old boy, Carrell's son and Will's half-brother, he befriends Alec.
- Carrell Myers as Tressa Kipp (regular in season 1, parts 1–2; recurring in seasons 2–3): Jim's divorced mother and Will's step-mother, she is trying to restart her life in her hometown of Houma, Louisiana.
- Scott Garrison as Will Kipp (season 1, part 2 and seasons 2–3): Tressa's step-son and Jim's half-brother, he came from Philadelphia and had befriended Alec.
- Kari Wuhrer as Abigail (season 1, part 2): A runaway synthetic human, she was created, by Dr. Woodrue.
- Kevin Quigley as Graham: He is the unimaginative yet trusty and devoted assistant to Arcane.
- Anthony Galde as Obo Hartison (season 1, part 1): A local handyman, he is a friend of Jim's.
- Dick Durock as Alec Holland / Swamp Thing: A professor, who was burned by chemicals at the hands of Dr. Anton Arcane, transforming him into a supernatural creature, known as "Swamp Thing", who is hellbent on protecting his new home from evil.

== Reception ==
A Swamp Thing comic book advertisement

Swamp Thing was at one time USA Network's top-rated show despite its mixed reception. Dick Durock, however, recounted being sent many positive reviews from various media. He also noted that the series had a strong European following, particularly in the Netherlands and the United Kingdom, which had a national Swamp Thing fan club.

The series failed to reach a considerable mainstream approval, but has gained a cult following due in part to the unintentional camp value of the early episodes. Adam-Troy Castro of SciFi.com gave a largely unimpressed review of the series' first DVD set, noting, "somehow the action never amounts to very much, because the staging is consistently beyond awful". While he noted moments of good cinematography, the Swamp Thing costume is criticized for its poor mobility and burden on fight scenes. Castro also considers the acting poor and the bonus interviews much more interesting than the episodes themselves.

Andrew Winistorfer of PopMatters heavily criticized the series in his review for the Volume Two DVD set. Calling it "a marathon of bad clichés, disjointed plot lines, lame acting, and even lamer stories devoid of any ironic pop culture worth at all", he gave the DVD set a 2/10 rating. Winistorfer also expressed frustration in the episodes being organized by original air dates rather than production order, causing numerous plot inconsistencies. Various other websites have echoed such statements in their own Swamp Thing DVD reviews.

At one point during the show's run, an animated series based on the comic book was broadcast on Fox; this effort was cancelled after only five episodes aired in 1991.

== Home media ==
In 1990, four episodes of Swamp Thing, labeled The New Adventures of Swamp Thing, were released on VHS in the United Kingdom. These were "Birth Marks", "The Watchers", "Tremors of the Heart", and "Walk a Mile in My Shoots".

Shout! Factory released Swamp Thing – The Series on 22 January 2008. This four-disc DVD set contains all 22 episodes of the first two seasons in their proper chronological order. Swamp Thing: The Series, Volume Two was released on July 15, 2008, and contains the first 25 episodes of the third season. This collection, however, organizes the episodes by original air date. Cast members reunited to film extras for the DVDs, and Durock embarked on a tour of fan conventions to promote the new releases.

A DVD collection titled Swamp Thing: Eight Favorite Episodes was released by Mill Creek Entertainment (under license by Shout! Factory) containing eight selected episodes on 14 July 2009. Shout! Factory released Swamp Thing: The Series, Volume 3 on 22 June 2010, containing the last episodes of the series, exclusively from the Shout! Factory website. Another single disc DVD compilation titled Swamp Thing: The Legend Continues was released on September 28, 2010, by Shout! Factory, containing seven selected episodes. Episodes in this DVD were: "Night of the Dying", "Love Lost", "Mist Demeanor", "A Nightmare on Jackson Street", "Better Angels", "Children of the Fool", and "A Jury of His Fears".

== See also ==
- The Swamp Thing Set
