= The Return of Swamp Thing =

1989 film by Jim Wynorski

- Theatrical release poster
- Directed by: Jim Wynorski
- Written by: Neil Cuthbert; Grant Morris
- Based on: Swamp Thing by: Len Wein; Bernie Wrightson
- Produced by: Benjamin Melniker; Michael E. Uslan
- Starring: Louis Jourdan; Heather Locklear; Sarah Douglas; Dick Durock
- Cinematography: Zoran Hochstätter
- Edited by: Leslie Rosenthal
- Music by: Chuck Cirino
- Production companies: Lightyear Entertainment; Batfilm Productions
- Distributed by: Millimeter Films
- Release date: May 12, 1989
- Running time: 88 minutes
- Country: United States
- Language: English
- Budget: $3 million
- Box office: $5.7 million (worldwide)

The Return of Swamp Thing is a 1989 American superhero film based on the DC Comics' character of the same name. Directed by Jim Wynorski, it is a sequel to the 1982 film Swamp Thing, having a lighter tone than its predecessor. The film has a main title montage consisting of comic book covers set to Creedence Clearwater Revival's "Born on the Bayou", and features Dick Durock and Louis Jourdan reprising their roles as Swamp Thing and Anton Arcane respectively, along with Sarah Douglas and Heather Locklear.

== Plot ==
After her mother's mysterious death, Abigail Arcane travels to the Florida swamps to confront her evil stepfather, Dr. Anton Arcane, who had been resurrected after his death in the first film.

In an attempt to stave off the effects of aging, Arcane, assisted by Dr. Lana Zurrell, combines genes from various swamp animals and human beings, creating an army of monsters known as Un-Men. Arcane captures Abby to use in his genetic experiments, but she is rescued by Swamp Thing, formerly scientist Alec Holland, who was transformed into a bog creature after a confrontation with Arcane and his henchmen a few years earlier.

Arcane and his new hired guns track the pair and eventually recapture Abby. During a final experiment where Arcane hopes to transfer Abby's living essence into his own body and make himself young again, Swamp Thing assaults the Arcane compound, killing most of his men. Knocking down doors, Swamp Thing barges into Arcane's laboratory to stop the experiment, but is attacked by one of his Un-Men, while Arcane becomes trapped under a heavy steel door. After a brief fight, Swamp Thing kills his Un-Men opponent, rescues Abby, and escapes with her before the entire building explodes, killing Arcane for good.

Swamp Thing uses his regenerative powers to heal Abby. When she is revived, she expresses her love for Swamp Thing and her desire to stay with him in the swamps. Due to Arcane's experiments and Swamp Thing using his powers on her, Abby grows a flowering plant from her foot, signifying that she may become a female version of Swamp Thing. The two stroll into the swamps together, hand-in-hand.

== Cast ==
- Louis Jourdan as Dr. Anton Arcane
- Heather Locklear as Abby Arcane
- Sarah Douglas as Dr. Lana Zurrell
- Dick Durock as Dr. Alec Holland / Swamp Thing
- Joey Sagal as Gunn
- Ace Mask as Dr. Rochelle
  - Rex Pierson as Mutated Dr. Rochelle
- Monique Gabrielle as Miss Poinsettia
- RonReaco Lee as Omar
- Daniel Emery Taylor as Darryl
- J. Don Ferguson as Bob
- Frank Welker as Gigi (voice)/Creatures (voices)

== Production ==
Jim Wynorski said he became involved in the film when friends recommended him to Benjamin Melniker and Michael Uslan. They asked him what he thought of the 1982 Swamp Thing and Wynorski "thought it was very stately and well shot" but that it needed "more action," a new suit, and add some kid elements." The producers were receptive to his ideas and hired the director.

In a 2018 interview, Wynorski recalled that he wanted Louis Jourdan to refer to Monique Gabrielle's character of Miss Poinsettia as "Points". Jourdan refused because he knew that the character's nickname was a sexual innuendo referring to her breasts. Wynorski then asked Jourdan, "Weren't you just in a movie called Octopussy?" Jourdan refused to speak to Wynorski for much of the shoot afterward.

In 2008, Dick Durock told Bullz-Eye.com that the Swamp Thing suit made filming difficult: "I hated the thought of having to go through the whole thing of wearing 50, 60, 70 pounds of weight in the summertime in Savannah, Georgia, but the money was there, and it's a job". According to BPA, Heather Locklear had a hard time working with the actor who played Swamp Thing in his human form during a dream sequence: "The model was full of himself and really rubbed Heather the wrong way. As soon as the model's scene was done, he was asked to leave the set".

== Release ==
=== Home media ===
RCA/Columbia Pictures Home Video released the film in 1989 on VHS. The film was issued on DVD by Image Entertainment, with a commentary by Wynorski, which suggests that some of the film's humor was not as intentional as it seems and that Wynorski had a degree of contempt for the material. The DVD also includes two environmental public service announcements for television, recorded with Durock in character and the two children featured in the film, Omar (RonReaco Lee) and Darryl (Daniel Emery Taylor). The PSAs aired in certain markets in 1989. Warner Bros. re-released the film in April 2008 on DVD. A Blu-ray edition was released by the British label Screenbound Pictures in May 2017.

MVD Entertainment Group released the film on Blu-ray/DVD combo pack on May 8, 2018, as part of their MVD Rewind Collection line. The DVD extras were ported over along with a new commentary track and interviews with Jim Wynorski, composer Chuck Cirino and editor Leslie Rosenthal, an interview with executive of Lightyear Entertainment Arnie Holland, plus a remastered 2K HD transfer. An Ultra HD Blu-ray edition of the film was released on February 7, 2023.

== Reception ==
=== Critical response ===
As of July 2025, on review aggregation website Rotten Tomatoes, the film had an approval rating of 56% based on 9 reviews, with an average rating of 3.92/10. Vincent Canby of The New York Times gave a negative review, proclaiming the film "is intended for people who missed the 1982 Swamp Thing and don't want the bother of renting the videocassette". He added that it "means to be funnier than it ever is" and "contains scenes of violence, most of which are so unconvincing as to be less scary than an average comic book".

A writer for Time Out gave a somewhat neutral review, stating that "Wynorski is well-versed in double-bluffing his audience, denying them the chance of balking at dreadful special effects by implying that the ineptitude is deliberate. He opts for cheap nostalgic laughs and camp '50s sci-fi scenery; depending on whether you find this funny, you'll either smile knowingly or gasp in disbelief". Another positive review was from Roger Ebert. He gave the movie a "thumbs up" when Gene Siskel did not on their show At the Movies. Cinapse also gave the positive review as "The Return Of Swamp Thing is a humorous and oddly sweet action adventure that wants nothing more than to entertain you with its quirkiness from start to finish". DVD Talk rated the film 4 stars of 5 stars, reviewing it as "Highly Recommended".

Before his death a year later, Dick Durock said in a 2008 interview that "they tried in Return of Swamp Thing to make it comedy, campy, and that's tough to make that work. I think [for the TV series] they kind of gave up on that idea and got back to the darker side of the character as he was written in the comic book". Kathleen Norris published a poem referring to this film ("Return of Swamp Thing") in her book Journey: New and Selected Poems 1969-1999 (2001).

=== Accolades ===
Heather Locklear won the Golden Raspberry Award for Worst Actress for her performance in the film at the 10th Golden Raspberry Awards.

== Other media ==
=== Novelization ===
Peter David wrote a novelization of the film. Disappointed with the script, David rewrote large chunks of the story. To his relief, the producers enjoyed the changes and allowed the book to be published as written.
