= Benjamin Melniker =

American film producer (1913–2018)

- Born: May 25, 1913; Bayonne, New Jersey, U.S.
- Died: February 26, 2018 (aged 104); Roslyn Harbor, New York, U.S.
- Resting place: Mount Hebron Cemetery, Flushing, New York, U.S.
- Occupations: Studio executive production lawyer
- Years active: 1939–2018
- Spouse(s): Jean Brody; Shirley Melniker (m. 1945)
- Children: 2 (1 deceased)

Benjamin Melniker (May 25, 1913 – February 26, 2018) was an American major motion picture studio executive at MGM.

== Career ==
=== Company man at MGM ===
Melniker started at MGM in 1939 and worked his way upward at the company, eventually becoming an executive vice president and chairman of the film selection committee at the studio. Melniker was involved in a number of important deals at the studio, including those for Ben Hur, 2001: A Space Odyssey and Dr. Zhivago.

=== 1979 "Batfilm Productions" deal ===
In 1979, Melniker was approached by a young lawyer named Michael E. Uslan to purchase the film rights to DC's Batman. At the time Uslan needed an industry legend in his corner in order to get anyone in the industry to take him seriously as he had difficulty getting his foot in the door in the industry any other already having been a failed screenwriter. Melniker recognized the opportunity to potentially make a lot of money because the Superman movie at WB had made a lot of money. While WB wasn't paying attention, they seized the film rights to Batman before the inevitable movie would be made. After obtaining the rights, no movie studio they approached wanted to make the movie precisely because of the opportunistic seizure of the rights and monetary demands.

=== 1983 deal at Casablanca ===
It was not until the pair met Peter Guber at Casablanca Records that deal to make the movie was actually made. The pair were forced to renegotiate the outrageous nature of their contract in order to retain screen credit. The pair reluctantly agreed and later attempted to sue Warner Brothers several times to gain even more financial compensation for themselves, but they always lost in court against WB's lawyers.

=== "Executive producer" credits and nature of the deal ===
Starting with Tim Burton's 1989 film, the pair are credited as "executive producers" on all Warner Bros. Batman and related films, including various direct-to-video feature-length animated films but due to the nature of the deal they will never be credited or paid royalties for any episode of television. Uslan continues to be credited as executive producer on Warner Batman film franchise entries. Apparently, upon death, the contract indicates that Melniker's name will no longer appear on any films after Zack Snyder's Justice League, and thusly Melniker's estate will only benefit from existing credits. Whether this was part of the original contact or something Uslan negotiated for upon his partner's death is unclear.

== Personal life ==
Melniker was part of a Jewish family. He was married twice. His first wife was Jean Brody. In 1945, he married his second wife, Shirley Melniker. Melniker had two sons, Harvey and Charles, the latter of whom died in 2012.

== On-screen credits ==
=== Film ===
Year	Title	Notes
1975	Mitchell	
1976	Shoot	
1982	Swamp Thing	
1989	The Return of Swamp Thing	
1989	Batman	
1992	Batman Returns	
1993	Harmful Intent	Television film
1993	Batman: Mask of the Phantasm	
1995	Batman Forever	
1997	Batman & Robin	
1998	Batman & Mr. Freeze: SubZero	Direct-to-video
2000	Batman Beyond: Return of the Joker	Direct-to-video
2003	Batman: Mystery of the Batwoman	Direct-to-video
2004	Catwoman	
2004	National Treasure	
2005	Constantine	
2005	Batman Begins	
2005	The Batman vs. Dracula	Direct-to-video
2008	Batman: Gotham Knight	Direct-to-video
2008	The Dark Knight	
2008	The Spirit	
2009	Superman/Batman: Public Enemies	Direct-to-video
2010	Batman: Under the Red Hood	Direct-to-video
2010	Superman/Batman: Apocalypse	Direct-to-video
2011	Batman: Year One	Direct-to-video
2012	Superman vs. The Elite	Direct-to-video
2012	The Dark Knight Rises	
2012	Batman: The Dark Knight Returns Part 1	Direct-to-video
2013	Batman: The Dark Knight Returns Part 2	Direct-to-video
2013	Lego Batman: The Movie - DC Super Heroes Unite	Direct-to-video
2014	The Lego Movie	
2014	Son of Batman	Direct-to-video
2014	Batman: Assault on Arkham	Direct-to-video
2015	Batman vs. Robin	Direct-to-video
2015	Batman Unlimited: Animal Instincts	Direct-to-video
2015	Justice League: Gods and Monsters	Direct-to-video
2015	Batman Unlimited: Monster Mayhem	Direct-to-video
2015	Lego DC Comics Super Heroes: Justice League: Attack of the Legion of Doom	Direct-to-video
2016	Batman: Bad Blood	Direct-to-video
2016	Lego DC Comics Super Heroes: Justice League: Cosmic Clash	Direct-to-video
2016	Batman v Superman: Dawn of Justice	
2016	Lego DC Comics Super Heroes: Justice League: Gotham City Breakout	Direct-to-video
2016	Batman: The Killing Joke	Direct-to-video
2016	Batman Unlimited: Mech vs. Mutants	Direct-to-video
2016	Batman: Return of the Caped Crusaders	Direct-to-video
2017	The Lego Batman Movie	
2017	Teen Titans: The Judas Contract	Direct-to-video
2017	Batman and Harley Quinn	Direct-to-video
2017	Batman vs. Two-Face	Direct-to-video
2017	Justice League	
2018	Scooby-Doo! & Batman: The Brave and the Bold	Direct-to-video
2018	Batman: Gotham by Gaslight	Direct-to-video
2018	Lego DC Comics Super Heroes: The Flash	Direct-to-video; posthumous release
2018	Batman Ninja	Direct-to-video; posthumous release
2018	Teen Titans Go! To the Movies	Posthumous release
2019	Justice League vs. the Fatal Five	Direct-to-video; posthumous release
2019	Batman vs. Teenage Mutant Ninja Turtles	Direct-to-video; posthumous release
2019	Batman: Hush	Direct-to-video; posthumous release

=== Television ===
Year	Title	Notes
1985	American Playhouse	1 episode
1987	TV's Greatest Bits	Television special
1987	Dinosaucers	5 episodes
1990-1993	Swamp Thing: The Series	48 episodes
1991	Swamp Thing	5 episodes
1992	Fish Police	6 episodes
1994-1995	Where on Earth Is Carmen Sandiego?	13 episodes

=== Shorts ===
Year	Title
2003	Chase Me
