= Dick Durock =

American actor (1937–2009)

- Durock as Jack Casey in Any Which Way You Can (1980)
- Born: Richard Durock; January 18, 1937; South Bend, Indiana, U.S.
- Died: September 17, 2009 (aged 72); Oak Park, California, U.S.
- Resting place: Hungarian Sacred Heart Cemetery, South Bend, Indiana, U.S.
- Occupations: Actor; stuntman
- Years active: 1967–1998
- Spouse: Jane Durock

Richard Durock (January 18, 1937 – September 17, 2009) was an American actor and stuntman who appeared in over eighty films and over seven hundred television episodes. He played the DC Comics superhero, Swamp Thing, in both the feature films Swamp Thing (1982) and The Return of Swamp Thing (1989), and the 1990–1993 Swamp Thing TV series. He stood an imposing 6'6".

== Biography ==
Durock played a rival Hulk-like creature on the television series The Incredible Hulk, in a two-part episode titled "The First". Durock also appeared in the Clint Eastwood films The Enforcer (1976) and Any Which Way You Can (1980) as well as Doc Savage: The Man of Bronze (1975), and Falcon Crest in 1983 in the second-season finale as a henchman for The Cartel. Durock also made a brief appearance in Rob Reiner's film Stand by Me as a county fair pie-eating champion.

== Personal life ==
Durock was born in South Bend, Indiana, to Serbian mother Sadie (Medich) and David Durock. He resided in Southern California and appeared at fan conventions.

== Death ==
Durock died of pancreatic cancer at his home in Oak Park, California on September 17, 2009. He was a veteran of the United States Marine Corps.

== Filmography ==
Year	Title	Role	Notes
1972	The Poseidon Adventure	Passenger	Uncredited
1976	Trackdown	Pool Player	Uncredited
1976	Death Journey	Thug #2	
1976	The Enforcer	Karl	
1978	The Nude Bomb	Jumpmaster	
1978	Battlestar Galactica	Imperious Leader	Uncredited
1980	Coast to Coast	Gregory	
1980	Any Which Way You Can	Joe Casey	
1981	The Incredible Hulk	Frye's Creature	2 episodes
1982	Swamp Thing	Swamp Thing	
1982	They Call Me Bruce?	N.Y. Bodyguard #2	
1985	Silverado	Bar Fighter #1	
1985	The A-Team	Thug In Italy	Judgment Day
1985	Runaway Train	Fight Guard	Uncredited
1986	Raw Deal	'Dingo'	
1986	Stand by Me	Bill Travis	
1987	Street Justice	Charlie	
1987	Blind Date	Bouncer	
1988	Remote Control	Driver #1	
1988	Mr. North	The Bouncer	
1988	Deadly Stranger	Cowboy Smitty	
1989	The Return of Swamp Thing	Swamp Thing	
1990-1993	Swamp Thing (TV series)	Swamp Thing	72 episodes
1991	Delirious	Riley	
1995	Die Hard with a Vengeance	Man At Subway Station	Uncredited
1998	The Hunted	Mack, The Henchman	(final film role)
