= Julie Hickson =

American film producer and screenwriter

- Occupation(s): Film producer, screenwriter
- Years active: 1982–2001

Julie Hickson is an American film producer and screenwriter. She helped write a 43-page story treatment for Tim Burton's 1989 film Batman in 1986. Prior to this, she produced Burton's 1983 television special Hansel and Gretel (also wrote) and his 1984 short film Frankenweenie.

Her other works include directing a short film entitled Fishing with George (1994), starring Eliza Dushku, and co-writing the films Homeward Bound II: Lost in San Francisco (1996) and Snow White: The Fairest of Them All (2001).

== Filmography ==
- Hansel and Gretel (1983) (producer and writer)
- Frankenweenie (1984) (producer)
- Fishing with George (short film) (1994)
- Homeward Bound II: Lost in San Francisco (1996) (writer)
- Snow White: The Fairest of Them All (TV film) (2001) (writer)
