= Michael E. Uslan =

American lawyer and film producer

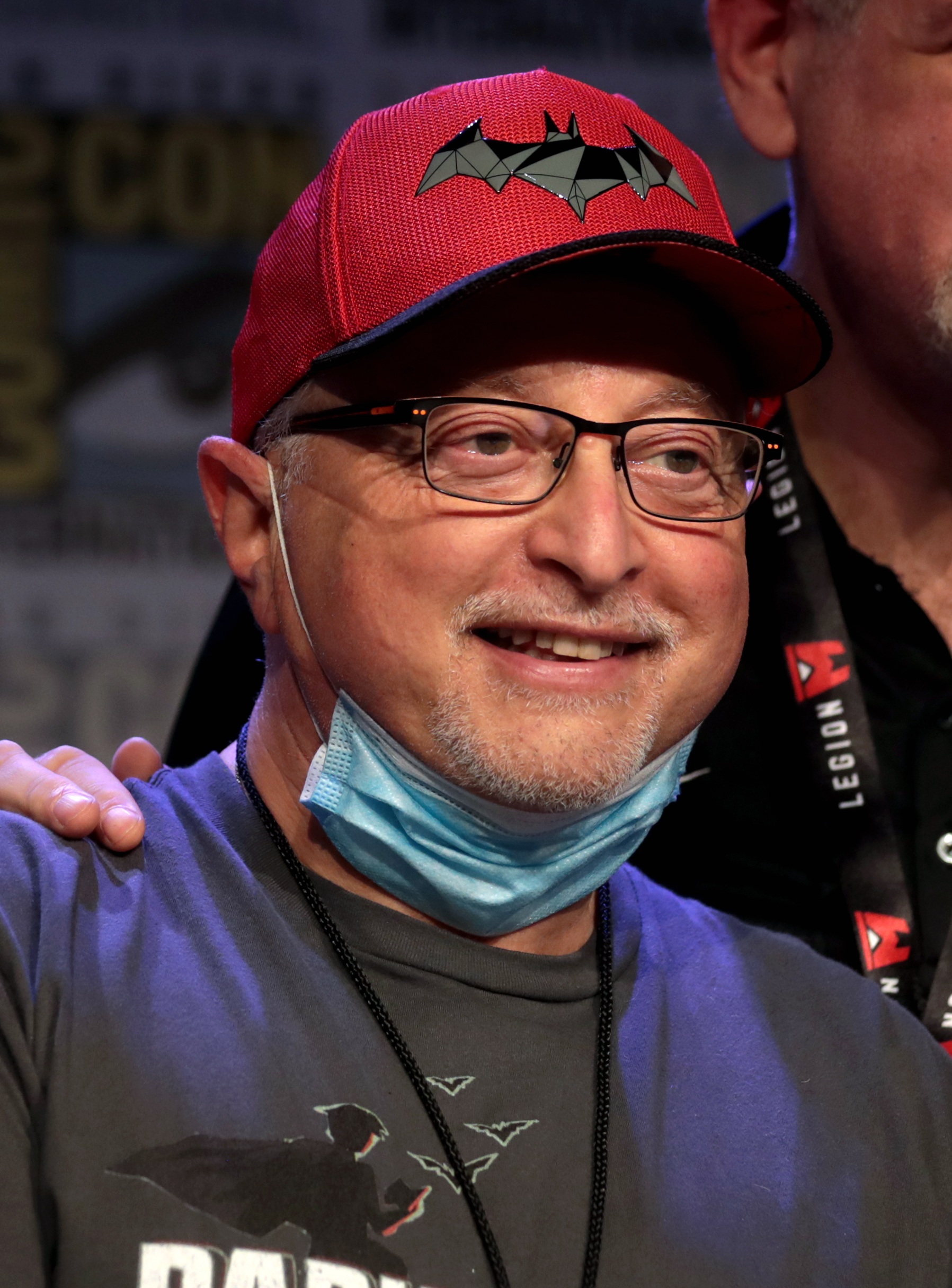
- Uslan in 2021
- Born: June 2, 1951 (age 75); Bayonne, New Jersey, U.S.
- Occupations: Lawyer, film producer, Chairman of the New Jersey Motion Picture and Television Commission, comics scholar
- Spouse: Nancy Uslan
- Children: 3
- Parent(s): Joe Uslan, Lilly Stark Uslan

Michael E. Uslan (/ˈjuːslən/; born June 2, 1951) is an American lawyer and film producer. Uslan has also dabbled in writing and teaching; he was the first instructor to teach an accredited course on comic book folklore at any university.

== Early life ==
=== Childhood ===
Uslan was born in Bayonne, New Jersey as part of a Jewish family. Uslan has asserted to have been an avid comic book collector from a very young age, claiming to have owned the second issue of Batman and the first Superman comic at one point. He grew up in Ocean Township, Monmouth County, New Jersey. By the late 60s, Uslan has admitted to storing over 30,000 comic books in his mother's garage. A fan of the earnest heroism inherent in the Batman comics, he was dismayed by the campy portrayal of the character in the '60s television series, which was at the height of its popularity during Uslan's teen years.

=== Education ===
Uslan graduated from Ocean Township High School in 1969. Uslan then decided to attend Indiana University School of Law – Bloomington with the intention of becoming a patent lawyer eventually. During this time his main agenda was to learn all about copyrights and trademark law in the hopes of one day acquiring the rights to one of his DC heroes. At the same time he was attempting to break into the film industry by sending off over 300 résumés, Uslan "developed a course idea for the Experimental Curriculum program at IU". Uslan completed his degree and is in fact, a fully trained lawyer.

== Career ==
=== Teaching ===
Uslan recalls that Roger Stern "has been teaching a one-hour credit experimental course on comic book history and art," while he (Uslan) was "having fun with an I.U. Free University course on 'The Comic Book Hero'." Stern and Uslan discovered they shared interests, and when Stern "couldn't stand teaching the course any longer," Uslan took it over and changed it into one that took "an academic approach to the comics, divided into its history, folklore, art, sociology, psychology, and literary/educational value. Looking at their stages of relevancy and fantasy, the many aspects of censorship, their effects on other media, penciling and inking styles, their psychological implications, current and future trends, and the role of comics in school systems."

Uslan intended that his course on comics gives students the full three hours of college credit, on a par with "history, physics, or chemistry." In order to be eligible to teach the course as an undergraduate, Uslan found a sponsor in Henry Glassie, a professor in the Department of Folklore, who saw superheroes as the logical descendant to Norse, Egyptian and Greek mythology.

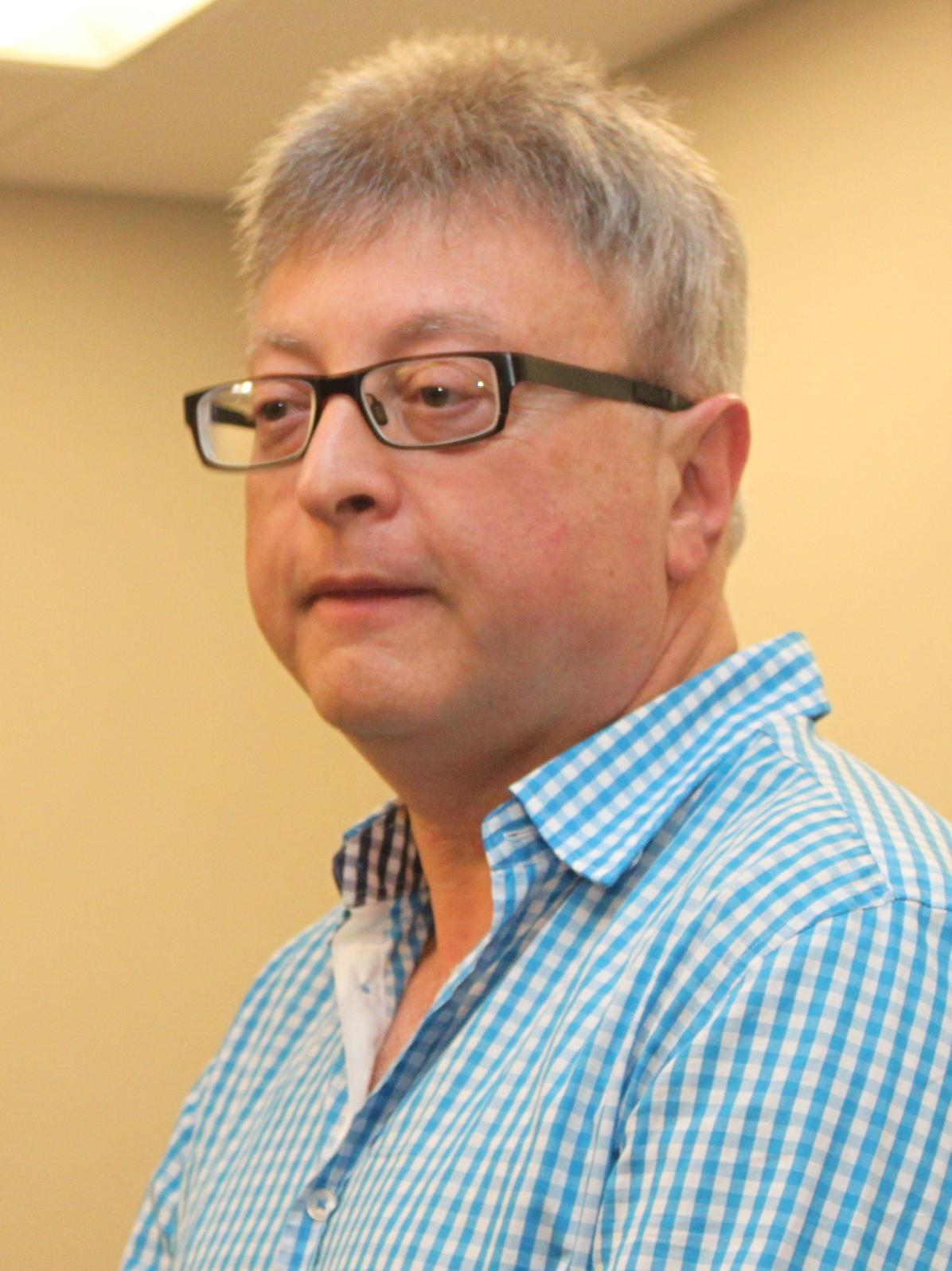
Uslan at the Florida Supercon in 2012

The Dean of the College of Arts and Sciences challenged the nature of Uslan's course, but gave his approval. Uslan's course, titled "The Comic Book in Society," thus became "the first accredited course on the serious study of comic books."

Uslan won fame for his comic book class by anonymously calling a local newspaper reporter and complaining about the course. TV crews filmed the first five meetings of the course, by then called "The Comic Book in America," including John Chancellor's NBC News. Intending to invite different speakers each semester, Uslan found that Denny O'Neil was voted for by the class so often that he became the regular invitee. Uslan notes that Bob Rozakis was among those passed over in favor of O'Neil.

Press coverage led to Uslan being invited to lecture at a number of colleges and high schools, as well as participate in talk shows on radio and TV. His first television appearance was alongside writers Steve Englehart and Gerry Conway. It also led to phone calls from Stan Lee, and eventually to a job offer from DC Comics. Uslan wrote a textbook dealing with his course, The Comic Book in America (Indiana University, 1971).

At Indiana University, Uslan is a Professor of Practice. In 2014, Uslan began instructing as a Professor of Practice at Indiana University, and has been implementing experiential learning in media school courses to better prepare students for their potential careers in the film and television industry. The classes he instructs (Live from L.A.: Pros Make Movies, and Business of Production Motion Pictures) involve bringing people who have worked "in the trenches everyday in Hollywood" to speak to students on the realities of the film industry.

=== Writing ===
Uslan attempted his first comics writing in 1975 at DC Comics' version of The Shadow and publishing competitor Charlton Comics' Charlton Bullseye. He also wrote a comic-book adaptation of Beowulf for DC Comics in 1975. He wrote some Batman comics before moving on to motion pictures.

He initiated Stan Lee's Just Imagine... and contributed short stories with renowned artists like John Severin, Gene Colan and Richard Corben to it.

He wrote some stories for The Spirit, before acquiring the film rights to the character. The film project eventually materialized as a feature film with Uslan's executive producer credit and net profits secure.

With only some brief (foreword) writing and editing stints in between, Uslan scripted the 2009 six-part story, Archie Marries Veronica.

2011 saw the publication of his autobiography, The Boy Who Loved Batman. Uslan then wrote the foreword to the 2012 Wiley & Sons book Batman and Psychology: A Dark and Stormy Knight, by Dr. Travis Langley. In 2021, it was announced that The Boy Who Loved Batman would be adapted into a Broadway play titled Darknights and Daydreams.

=== Movie pitches and film rights ownership ===
Due to Uslan's prior work at DC Comics he became a hands-on producer during the filming of Swamp Thing and The Return of Swamp Thing.

In 1979, Uslan teamed with long-time Hollywood producer Benjamin Melniker to purchase the film rights to DC's Batman. As of 2025, he continues to own the rights, now with Melniker's estate following his death in 2018. Starting with Tim Burton's 1989 film, the pair are credited as "executive producers" on all Warner Bros. Batman and related films, including various direct-to-video feature-length animated films but due to the nature of the deal they will never be credited or paid royalties for any episode of television. Uslan continues to be credited as executive producer on Warner Batman film franchise entries, the latest being 2022's The Batman, 2024's Joker: Folie à Deux.

In addition to the Swamp Thing films, Uslan and Melniker were also credited as executive producers on the '90s live-action Swamp Thing TV series and Swamp Thing animated series, and 2008's The Spirit film, among others.

==== Other credits ====
Additional credits include Three Sovereigns for Sarah (1985), part of the American Playhouse series on PBS, starring Vanessa Redgrave and dealing with the Salem Witch Trials; the children's geography-teaching Where in the World is Carmen Sandiego? game show; and the subsequent Where on Earth Is Carmen Sandiego? animated series.

Uslan created, co-produced, and wrote a few episodes of the 1980s cartoon Dinosaucers. Uslan and Melniker were also producers on the Keanu Reeves-fronted Constantine and associate producers on Disney's National Treasure.

He was hired to advise Genius Brands on the use of Stan Lee Universe IP in July 2020.

=== Charity and other work ===
In 2005, Uslan donated his 30,000 comic book collection to Indiana University's Lilly Library (rare books and manuscripts library), a collection which (according to his wife Nancy) "filled three rooms of their house." Uslan was the honorary speaker at the 2006 Indiana University commencement ceremonies, held on May 6, 2006. Uslan was the honorary speaker at the 2012 Westfield State University commencement ceremonies, held on May 19, 2012.

== Awards ==
With his co-executive producers, Uslan won a 1995 Daytime Emmy for Where on Earth Is Carmen Sandiego?, and he was also awarded an Independent Spirit Award at the 2005 Garden State Film Festival. In 2011, he was awarded the Lifetime Achievement Award by the Peace River Film Festival. On October 10, 2012, he received an Honorary Doctorate of Fine Arts from Monmouth University in West Long Branch, New Jersey. That same year, he was awarded the Inkpot Award.

== Personal life ==
Uslan has been a resident of Cedar Grove, New Jersey. He is married to Nancy Uslan. Uslan has indicated on social media that he still celebrates holidays like Hanukkah. His son, David Miles Uslan, joined Planet Tota as a Strategic Advisor.
