= Hansel and Gretel (1983 TV special) =

1983 television special by Tim Burton

- Genre: Fantasy
- Based on: "Hansel and Gretel" by the Brothers Grimm
- Written by: Julie Hickson
- Directed by: Tim Burton
- Starring: Jim Ishida; Michael Yama; Andy Lee; Alison Hong; David Koenigsberg
- Narrated by: Vincent Price
- Theme music composer: Johnny Costa
- Country of origin: United States
- Original language: English

Production
- Executive producer: Julie Hickson
- Producer: Rick Heinrichs
- Cinematography: Victor Abdalov
- Editors: Paul Dougherty; Christopher Roth; Michael Stringer
- Running time: 34 minutes
- Production companies: Burton & Heinrichs Productions
- Budget: $116,000

Original release
- Network: Disney Channel
- Release: October 29, 1983

Hansel and Gretel is a television special that was made in 1983 for The Disney Channel, directed by Tim Burton. It only aired twice on October 29 and 31, 1983, at 10:30 P.M. The only other times it was shown was as part of the Tim Burton retrospective at the Museum of Modern Art in New York City, and the Tim Burton L'Exposition at the Cinémathèque Française in Paris as part of a traveling exhibit.

== Plot ==
The film features an entirely East Asian cast as the eponymous characters: a poor toy-maker, his son, Hansel, and daughter, Gretel, and his wicked new wife, who overtly despises her stepchildren. One evening at dinner, Hansel and Gretel decide to tease their stepmother. She becomes so fed up of their games that she attempts to beat them up, but their father stops her, having her send them into their attic bedroom instead. Their father waits until his cruel wife is asleep and goes into the attic with a small clown puppet he'd made and a few cookies he'd sneaked for them to cheer the children up. He then puts the children to bed and sets down a small swan toy before turning into bed himself.

The next morning, the stepmother decides to take Hansel and Gretel for a walk in the labyrinthine forest. Certain that the children would be unable to find their way out on their own, she abandons them by tossing a small firework toy in the children's path to distract them. Unbeknownst to their wicked stepmother, Gretel had told Hansel to pick up a pile of small stones near the house and drop them so they may find their way home, knowing their stepmother's plot. The children manage to find their way back home that same evening using the stones Hansel had dropped.

While their father is in town selling his toys the next morning, the children's stepmother, unhappy with their return, decides to take the children on another walk in the woods. Before leaving the house, she gives the children a toy duck, telling them it is one of their father's toys. The children, not trusting their stepmother, once again leave a trail of stones behind them on their path. As they walked, the toy duck they were dragging had, unbeknownst to them, been eating the stone trail they left along the way. Once again they find themselves deserted in the woods, but this time with no direction home. Hansel and Gretel have no choice but to sleep in the woods that night. As they slept, the toy duck slowly transforms into a small toy robot which leads them to a house made of gingerbread and candy.

As the children eat the house's façade, the candy cane-nosed witch who lives within the gingerbread house lures them inside with the promise of sweets. The witch brings the children to her dining table where an enormous cake sits, adorned with small cutouts of Hansel and Gretel. When the children try to eat the cake, they find that it is only a decoration. The witch then tells them the furniture and even the walls of the house are real candy, which the children happily and greedily enjoy. The witch, seemingly upset with herself for not thinking how tired the children must be, bring Hansel and Gretel upstairs to a large bedroom with two giant marshmallow beds for them to sleep in. They lie in the two beds the witch prepared and are immediately captured by the now living beds. Hansel escapes for a moment before the witch catches him once more and drops him back on the bed. The bed then reveals a mouth-like doorway in the wall which drops Hansel into a cavernous room with a strange mobile hanging down from the ceiling.

The mobile drops what appears at first to be a large lump of dough which emerges from behind the boy as a creepy clown-like gingerbread man named Dan Dan. Dan Dan insists that Hansel eat him and begins driving Hansel crazy with his incessant screaming on the matter. Finally, Hansel takes Dan Dan's head, the one part he refused to eat, and throws him into the wall, shattering Dan Dan to pieces. The witch, by this point, had taken Gretel down to the kitchen to begin heating the oven to cook Hansel. The witch pulls a chain hanging from her ceiling which causes two long arms to drop from the mobile above Hansel and bring him back up to the kitchen so she could begin baking him. Before the witch can shove Hansel into her oven, however, Gretel grabs the fire iron beside the oven and hits the witch in the back with it. Enraged, the witch fights Gretel in a kung fu-style battle while Hansel breaks free to join the fight.

The children, seeing the oven has opened once more, lure the witch to them. As they stand before the roaring furnace, the witch takes a flying kick in their direction, flinging herself accidentally into her own oven. Hansel and Gretel lock the witch inside the oven as the house begins to melt and ooze with frosting. Hansel and Gretel narrowly escape the melting house and watch as it becomes no more than a river of melted candy. Suddenly, the toy swan their father had given them the evening before appears on the melted candy river in the form of a small boat and leads the children back home to their happy father. He explains that he forced their wicked stepmother to leave their home, fed up with her want to get rid of his children. As the children celebrate with their father, the swan boat begins to spout gold coins from its mouth, thus providing them with the wealth they have needed.

== Cast ==
- Andy Lee — Hansel
- Alison Hong — Gretel
- Michael Yama — Stepmother/Wicked Witch
- Jim Ishida — Father
- Joe Ranft (puppetry) and David Koenigsberg (voice) — Dan Dan the Gingerbread Man
- Vincent Price — Host

== Production ==
Filmed for $116,000 on 16mm, this live-action short film features a cast of East Asian-American amateur actors, kung fu fights, and Japanese toys, as Burton was obsessed with Japanese culture at the time of production. The film's design style and color schemes pay homage to the Godzilla films and feature heavy special effects such as front projection, forced perspective, and even some stop-motion animation. Though some sources claim the film runs a full 45 minutes, the version released on YouTube is 34 minutes and 17 seconds (with the credits cut off). This is due to the film being paired with Tim Burton's Vincent short film and various bumpers, and Vincent Price's introduction during its original airing.

== Screenings ==
A Financial Times article states that the special was screened at Museum of Modern Art as part of a Tim Burton special exhibition which ran from November 22, 2009, to April 26, 2010. Always included in this same traveling exhibition, the film was also shown in Paris at La Cinémathèque française from March 7 to April 13, 2012 and then Hong Kong, from November 5, 2016 until the exhibition ended on 23 January 2017. As of February 2018, it is screening in Mexico City as part of "The World of Tim Burton" exhibition.

In June 2014, a copy of the short appeared in its entirety online with a better quality and more complete version, with end credits intact (although the introduction featuring Vincent Price is missing). It was later uploaded on Vimeo in 2021 by William Gazecki who worked as the Audio Sweetening Mixer for this film.
