= Snow White: The Fairest of Them All =

2001 fantasy adventure TV film directed by Caroline Thompson

- Based on: Snow White recorded by the Brothers Grimm
- Written by: Caroline Thompson; Julie Hickson
- Directed by: Caroline Thompson
- Starring: Miranda Richardson; Kristin Kreuk
- Music by: Michael Convertino; Robert Muzingo
- Countries of origin: Canada; Germany; United States
- Original languages: English; German; French

Production
- Executive producers: Robert Halmi Sr.; Robert Halmi Jr.
- Producers: Matthew O'Connor; Caroline Thompson
- Cinematography: Jon Joffin
- Editor: Margaret Goodspeed
- Running time: 93 minutes
- Production company: Hallmark Entertainment

Original release
- Network: ABC
- Release: October 28, 2001

Snow White: The Fairest of Them All is a 2001 fantasy adventure film co-written and directed by Caroline Thompson and produced by Hallmark Entertainment. The film was first released theatrically in Europe, then subsequently aired in the United States on ABC on March 17, 2002, on The Wonderful World of Disney series.

Based upon the traditional Snow White folktale first recorded in 1812 by German folklorists the Brothers Grimm, the film deviates from earlier interpretations of the story in several respects. Set in a fantasy kingdom, it tells the story of Snow White (Kristin Kreuk), and the attempts of her malevolent stepmother, Queen Elspeth (Miranda Richardson), to eliminate her. Trying to escape Queen Elspeth's machinations, Snow White flees to the forest, where she befriends Sunday (Michael J. Anderson), the leader of the seven dwarfs, and together they plot the monarch's overthrow.

Reviews were mixed, with Richardson's performance receiving praise, but Kreuk's coming under criticism for being too bland. The film would subsequently be released on DVD.

== Plot ==
A young husband and wife, John and Josephine, wish for a child with skin as white as snow, lips as red as blood and hair as black as ebony. Their wish is granted and they are gifted a baby girl, whom they name Snow White. However, Josephine dies in childbirth. In the winter, John struggles to find food for his daughter, eventually collapsing and shedding a tear over a frozen lake, which frees the “Green-Eyed One”, an imprisoned djinn. As thanks for freeing him, the djinn asks John what he desires. John requests milk for his daughter, and the djinn grants his wish. John then asks to have Josephine back, calling her his Queen, but the djinn cannot resurrect the dead. Instead, he makes John a wealthy king and promises him a Queen.

The djinn pays a visit to Elspeth, his hideous witch sister who resents him for abandoning her years earlier when he was mortal. He offers to make up for his failure by transforming her into a beautiful woman and offering her John's hand. The djinn also provides Elspeth with a magical mirror that allows her to see others unseen and to deceive John. As years pass, Elspeth forms a relationship with her new husband and stepdaughter, now a sixteen-year-old princess. Her beauty, however, causes jealousy and resentment from the queen to the point where she keeps a room full of magical mirrors that constantly assure her that she "is the fairest of them all".

When Prince Alfred arrives in the kingdom and falls in love with Snow White, Elspeth is furious to discover that images of Snow White are appearing in her mirrors, which means that her stepdaughter is now more beautiful than her. Overcome with jealousy, Elspeth orders hunter Hector to take Snow White into the forest and kill her, and then return with Snow White's heart for her to consume. To keep Alfred from interfering, she curses him into the form of a bear and chases him off into the wilderness. Unable to kill Snow White, Hector presents Elspeth with the heart of a wild boar instead. After learning the truth, Elspeth kills Hector, imprisons John in her mirrors, and binds Snow White with an enchanted ribbon. Dwarf Sunday arrives and removes the ribbon. Snow White faints, so he carries the Princess, aided by six other dwarfs, inside their cottage to rest.

Snow White is introduced to the dwarfs each named after the days of the week and possessing the power to transform into a rainbow to move from one place to another (but are only capable of this if all seven of them are present). The eldest is Sunday, who is a victim of one of Elspeth's spells which left half of him as a garden gnome. The dwarfs allow Snow White to clean their home, though dwarf Wednesday is initially suspicious. When Elspeth learns that Snow White is still alive, she prepares a poisoned apple and disguises herself as Josephine. Aided by dwarf Monday after deceiving him into believing he would be restored (but instead turning him into a full gnome), Elspeth finds Snow White and convinces her to eat the apple, which seemingly kills her.

Elspeth is then turned back into her hideous former self once she attempts to use the mirror again. The djinn appears and reveals that her evil deeds have cost Elspeth her beauty, which is something he cannot undo. Angry at this revelation, Elspeth throws the mirror at the djinn, but misses, breaking it in the process and fully trapping her in her true form. Meanwhile, the dwarfs, unable to revive Snow White, place her in a coffin of ice and leave her near Monday's statue. After receiving a kiss of true love from Alfred (still in his bear form), she is revived. The spells cast upon Alfred, Sunday and Monday are broken and Elspeth's mirrors shatter, freeing John. Elspeth is also freed but is cornered and killed by the gnomes she had turned to stone, who have been released from their enchantments. Freed from Elspeth, the djinn departs. Snow White and Alfred live happily ever after while the dwarfs decide to move on to find Sleeping Beauty.

== Cast ==
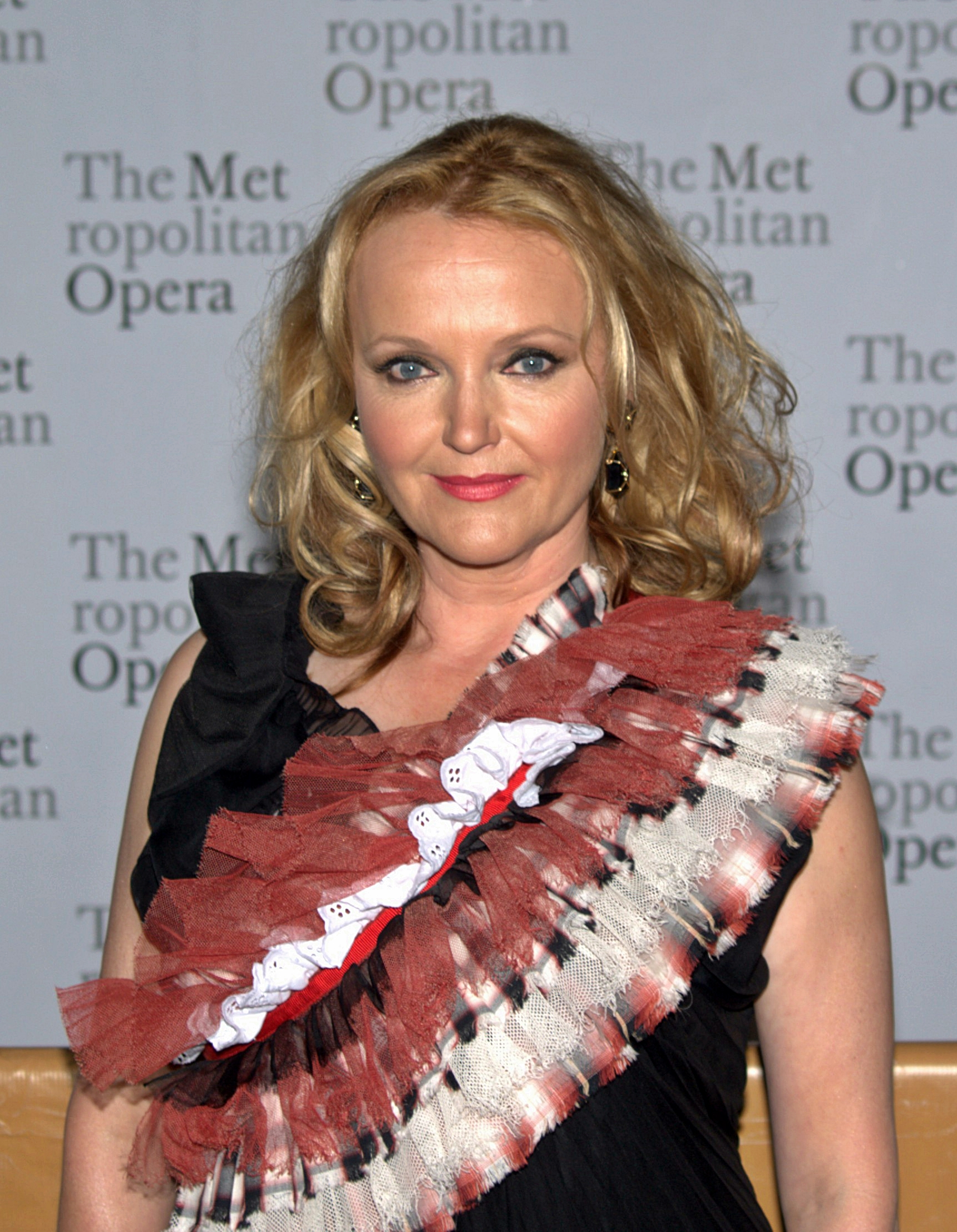
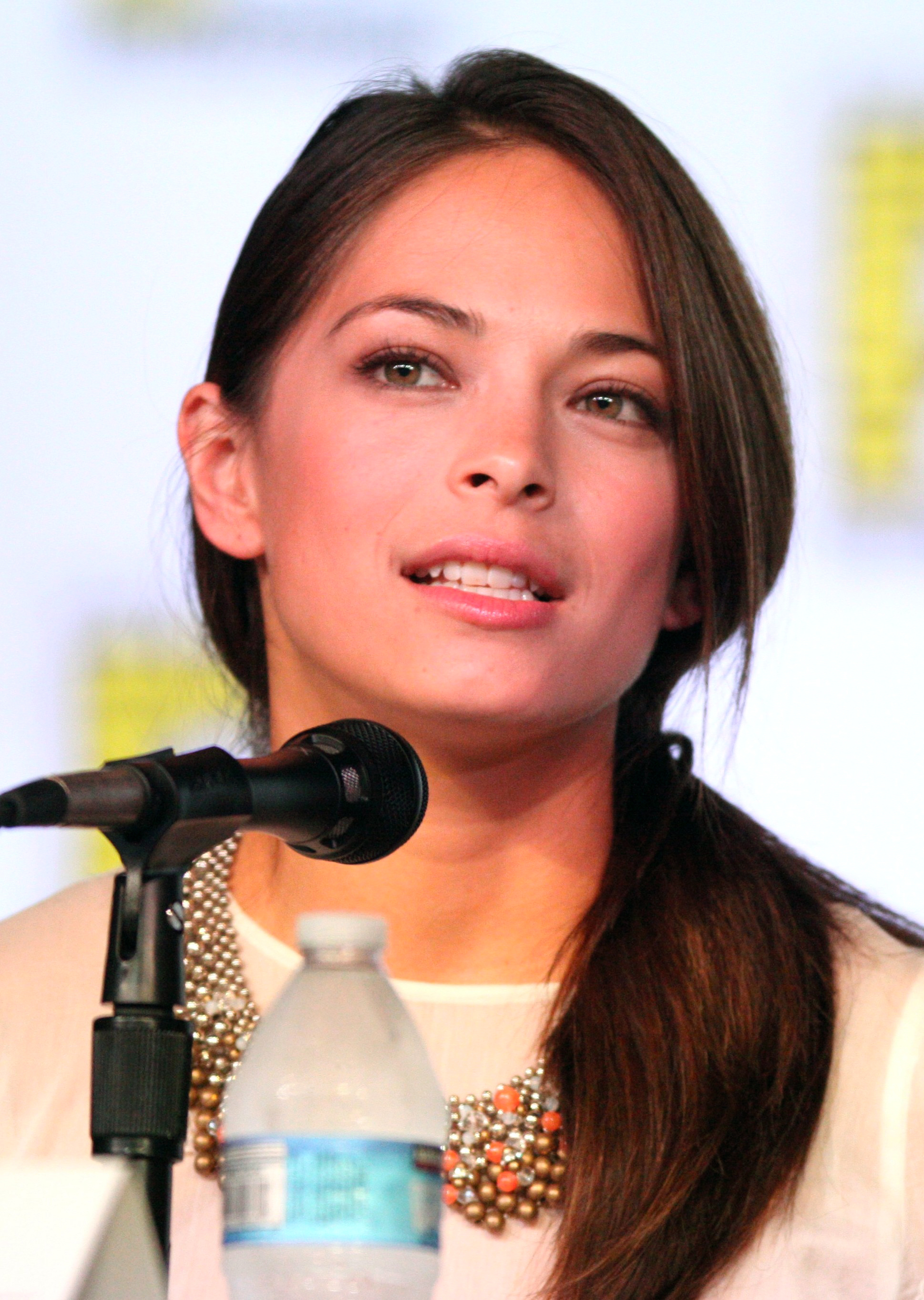
The two main characters, Queen Elspeth and Snow White, were played by Miranda Richardson (left) and Kristin Kreuk (right), respectively.
- Miranda Richardson as Queen Elspeth, Snow White's stepmother
  - Karin Konoval as Crone, Elspeth's old hag form
- Kristin Kreuk as Snow White
- Tom Irwin as John, Snow White's father
- Vera Farmiga as Josephine, Snow White's mother
- Tyron Leitso as Prince Alfred
- Clancy Brown as the Granter of Wishes
- Michael Gilden as Monday, the red dwarf
- Mark J. Trombino as Tuesday, the orange dwarf
- Vincent Schiavelli as Wednesday, the yellow dwarf
- Penny Blake as Thursday, the green dwarf
- Martin Klebba as Friday, the blue dwarf
- Warwick Davis as Saturday, the indigo dwarf
- Michael J. Anderson as Sunday, the violet dwarf
- Jose Zuniga as Hector, the Huntsman

== Development ==
In order to write the script, Caroline Thompson went back to the original written account of Snow White, published by the Brothers Grimm in 1812. She came to the decision that the folktale was about the "fear of change", as two women, Snow White and her stepmother, came to adjust with the changes that they were facing in life. Noting that the original 19th century folk tales were far "darker" in content than most 20th century adaptations, such as Walt Disney's Snow White and the Seven Dwarfs (1937), she sought to utilise some of these dark elements in her adaptation. The idea for the Green-Eyed One was introduced by co-writer Julie Hickson; Thompson noted that he was a "genuinely moral being" who tried to help people, comparing him to the genius of the peace found in Late Medieval literature.

Upon reading the script, Kristin Kreuk noted that she had been "entranced", believing that the main message that audiences would take away from the film was that of not judging an individual's personality based upon their physical appearances. Richardson thought that Caroline Thompson's adaptation was "much more in keeping" with the ethos of the Grimm tale than subsequent adaptations due to its "darker" nature. Praising Miranda Richardson as being perfect for the role of Elspeth, Caroline Thompson asserted that she had been "a blast to work with." Caroline Thompson noted that she cast the actors to play the dwarves according to their own individual personalities; she remarked that Warwick Davis was a "phenomenal actor" while Penny Blake was "so funny" and Michael J. Anderson was a "genius." Together, she thought that they brought an "array of talents" to the production. Michael J. Anderson himself claimed that he identified with his character, the "philosopher of the group", and really enjoyed playing the role. Commenting on his character of Wednesday, Vincent Schiavelli noted that he was miserable because "he really thinks that he's a dwarf" even though he isn't.

Caroline Thompson would also praise her "magnificent collaborators" in costume and set design. The set designer noted that they constructed a castle that they felt was best described as "Viking art nouveau."

Filming took place in and around Vancouver, Canada.

== Release ==
The film was released theatrically in Europe and the Middle East in 2001, and debuted in the United States on March 17, 2002, when it was broadcast as part of ABC's The Wonderful World of Disney series. Both Region 1 and Region 2 DVDs of the film were released. Reviewing the Artisan DVD release for the Combustible Celluloid website, Jeffrey M. Anderson praised its "gorgeous full-screen transfer", featurette, and cast-and-crew biographies, but highlighted that it contained no director's commentary track.

== Reception ==
Laura Fries reviewed the film for Variety, describing it as a "unique and lavish production that certainly warrants attention" but warning that it would be inappropriate for young children. Asserting that ABC had made a "big mistake" by airing it as a part of their Wonderful World of Disney series, she thought that it was "often nightmarish", harking back to the original Grimm version more than the better-known Disney adaptation; in particular, she singled out the "evil queen/witch" and "satanic messenger who grants wishes." However, she praised David Brisbin's set design, remarking that he had created a kingdom which was "equal parts gingerbread baroque and David Lynch" and that Caroline Thompson "clearly relishes" in this universe. Noting that the "magnificently villainous performance" from Miranda Richardson "virtually steals the show" from the "doe-eyed" Kristin Kreuk, she believes that the latter does "little to upgrade" the image of Snow White as the most victimized of fairytale characters.

Writing for The New York Times, Hal Erickson praised the film for mixing its "more frightening aspects" with "slapstick comedy and awesome special effects." Jeffrey M. Anderson reviewed Snow White for the Combustible Celluloid website, awarding it three stars out of four. Remarking that Thompson "completely eradicates" the Disney interpretation of the folktale, he praised her directorial debut, noting the influence of Tim Burton but claiming that she offers "a more universal sweetness" than he does. He notes that while remaining accessible to children, the film still "drinks more deeply of the story's dark elements". David Parkinson of Radio Times awarded Snow White two stars out of five, praising Miranda Richardson's performance and comparing it to that of Sigourney Weaver in Snow White: A Tale of Terror. He also acclaimed the casting of Vincent Schiavelli as the tall dwarf, but in contrast, he criticised Kristin Kreuk's "inanimate performance", seeing her as a "dull heroine." M.S. Mason of the Christian Science Monitor said: "Beautiful young Kristin Kreuk makes a lovely Snow White" although felt that the film was only "passable family fare".

== See also ==
- List of films about witchcraft
