= MVD Entertainment Group =

Production company

- Type: Private
- Industry: Film production Film distribution
- Founded: 1986
- Founder: Tom Seaman
- Headquarters: Pottstown, Pennsylvania, United States
- Website: mvdentertainment.com

MVD Entertainment Group, (previously Music Video Distributors, Inc.) is an American independent production company and music and film distributor based in Pottstown, Pennsylvania, consisting of three main departments: MVD Visual, MVD Audio, and MVD Distribution.

The company was founded by Tom Seaman in 1986 and has released over 8,000 titles for DVD, Blu-ray, CD, vinyl records, and digital. The company was owned by Tom and his son, Ed Seaman, until Tom's death in 2025.

MVD works with several recording labels, including Manifesto Records, Metal Mind Productions, Amherst Records, SlipTrick Records, and Cherry Red Records. The company also represents video labels such as Arrow Films, Blue Underground, Cleopatra Entertainment, Severin Films, Synapse Films, Troma Entertainment and others, as well as in-house label MVD Rewind.

== History ==
After working at record chain Sam Goody, record label CBS Records, and then JEM Distribution, Tom Seaman launched Music Video Distributors with his wife, Elinor, in 1986. The company began with building a catalog of audiovisual content on DVDs. As such, it largely focused on comedies, cult classics, documentaries, horror movies, and music concert films.

In 2006, MVD entered the audio distribution space, launching MVD Audio. It then merged with Big Daddy Music Distribution, acquiring a catalog of CDs, vinyl, and digital audio rights.

As of 2013, MVD Entertainment Group also produced and marketed low-budget thriller movies.

By mid-2015, Tom Seaman's son, Ed, was MVD's COO. According to Ed, in an interview with Goldmine, the company had expanded beyond its initial and main focus on "audiovisual content", with music films, non-music films, and audio distribution each representing one-third of the business.

In March 2023, MVD and Gotham Distribution Corporation, the owner of Oldies.com, announced Old School Ventures, Inc., a new entity formed between the companies to operate Oldies.com., which sells records, CDs, DVDs, books, etc.

In April 2024, MVD partnered with horror label Dark Arts Entertainment to launch a new movie distribution company in North America.

In November 2024, MVD helped Umbrelic Entertainment revive home video brand Anchor Bay Entertainment by launching three movies—Sean Whalen's Crust (2024), Jeff Daniels Phillips' Cursed in Baja (2024), and Abruptio (2023)—on disc via MVD's distribution arm.

In November 2025, MVD founder Tom Seaman passed away at age 85. MVD would then be run by Tom's son, Ed Seaman, and Tom's daughter, Eve Edwards, who had been co-CEOs since 2023.

In July 2026, it was announced that MVD had partnered with Video Store Day, to be celebrated on October 17, 2026. Similar to Record Store Day, the event features exclusive Blu-ray, 4K Ultra HD, DVD, and VHS releases sold only through participating stores.

== Home video labels ==
=== MVD Rewind Collections ===
In 2017, the company launched a line of Blu-ray releases called the MVD Rewind Collection. The line features cult movies from the 1980s through the 1990s not previously released on Blu-ray in North America, and some that were never released on DVD. Each release is numbered and features a slipcover that gives a throw-back look of a weathered VHS case. The line does not focus on any particular genre, as was shown with the announcement of their first two releases, the punk music documentary D.O.A.: A Rite of Passage (1980) and the cult horror film Attack of the Killer Tomatoes (1978).

In 2023, the company launched a line of 4K Blu-ray releases called the MVD Rewind LaserVision Collection, with Wes Craven's Swamp Thing (1982) being the first title.

=== MVD Marquee Collection and MVD Classics ===
In 2018, MVD announced they would add two new labels. The first one, MVD Marquee Collection, features Blu-ray releases of catalog titles that were too new to be considered cult. The line includes new to Blu-ray movies as well as re-releases of out of print titles. The other one, MVD Classics, will feature more obscure movies which may be released on DVD if an HD master isn't available. Unlike the Rewind Collection, neither of the lines are numbered.
