= Swamp Thing (1982 film) =

1982 film by Wes Craven

- Theatrical release poster by Richard Hescox
- Directed by: Wes Craven
- Written by: Wes Craven
- Based on: Swamp Thing by: Len Wein; Bernie Wrightson
- Produced by: Benjamin Melniker; Michael E. Uslan
- Starring: Louis Jourdan; Adrienne Barbeau
- Cinematography: Robbie Greenberg
- Edited by: Richard Bracken
- Music by: Harry Manfredini
- Production company: Swampfilms
- Distributed by: Embassy Pictures (United States); United Artists (international, through United International Pictures)
- Release date: February 19, 1982
- Running time: 91 minutes
- Country: United States
- Language: English
- Budget: $2.5 million

Swamp Thing is a 1982 American superhero film written and directed by Wes Craven, based on the DC Comics character of the same name created by Len Wein and Bernie Wrightson. It tells the story of scientist Alec Holland (Ray Wise) who is transformed into the monster known as Swamp Thing (Dick Durock) through laboratory sabotage orchestrated by the evil Anton Arcane (Louis Jourdan). Later, he helps a woman named Alice Cable (Adrienne Barbeau) and battles the man responsible for it all, the ruthless Arcane. The film did well on home video and cable and was followed by a sequel, The Return of Swamp Thing, in 1989.

== Plot ==
After Hank, a scientist, is mysteriously killed while assisting a top-secret bioengineering project, government worker Alice Cable arrives at the bogs to serve as his replacement. Alice immediately notices that one of the team's swamp sensors has malfunctioned, and Harry Ritter reveals that Hank was attempting to repair it when he was killed. Charlie tells Ritter a rumor about an evil paramilitary leader named Anton Arcane, who intends to hijack their operation. Alice introduces herself to Dr. Linda Holland and her brother, lead scientist Dr. Alec Holland, who takes her on a tour and encourages her to admire the beauty of the swamps.

After noting the disappearance of one of their workers, the group hears a loud bang and returns to the laboratory, where Linda shows off her recent breakthrough: a glowing, plant-based concoction with explosive properties. Sometime later, Alec notices that droplets of Linda's formula spawned rapid plant growth on the surfaces they touched. Suddenly, a group of paramilitary agents attacks her and raids Alec's laboratory. A man resembling Ritter steps forward, but pulls off his mask and reveals himself as Arcane. When Arcane shoots Linda for attempting to escape with the formula, Alec grabs the beaker, but trips, causing the spilled chemicals to set him on fire. He runs outside and dives into the swamp to extinguish the flames as a series of explosions bursts from the water.

Overnight, Arcane's henchmen destroy the premises and remove all evidence of the team's work. At dawn, henchman Ferret captures Alice and attempts to drown her in the swamp, but a green, humanoid creature rescues her. Meanwhile, in his mansion, Arcane and his secretary realize that Alec's most recent notebook is missing. Alice runs to a nearby gas station to telephone her employers for help; the operator connects her to Arcane, who, posing as Ritter, claims to have been called away from the site before the attack. After revealing she stole Alec's last notebook, Alice waits for Ritter's return alongside the young gas station attendant, Jude, but Arcane's men arrive and chase her through the forest. Suddenly, the green humanoid creature, referred to as the Swamp Thing, appears and again scares the pursuers away, and Alice escapes.

Alice and Jude boat around the swamp until they reach the dock near the laboratory wreckage. Multiple boats of Arcane's men close in on Alice and Jude, luring the creature from its hiding place among the reeds. Despite their bullets and grenades, the Swamp Thing arranges an elaborate boat crash. Moments after instructing Jude to escape with Alec's notebook, Alice hears the boy cry out in distress, but she is kidnapped before she can reply. The Swamp Thing finds Jude's lifeless body and presses a hand against his head, creating a greenish glow which instantly revives him. Regaining consciousness, Jude realizes the creature is a friend of Alice's and gives it the notebook for safekeeping. On Arcane's boat, Alice throws her kidnapper, Ferret, overboard, then dives into the water and swims ashore. Once on land, Alice bumps into the Swamp Thing, which calls out her name. Ferret chops off the Swamp Thing's arm with a machete, but the creature easily crushes Ferret's skull, causing Alice to faint. She awakens in the monster's embrace. The Swamp Thing speaks to her, and she recognizes it as Alec. Arcane's men follow her, capture the Swamp Thing in a net, and retrieve the final notebook.

That evening, Arcane invites Alice to a formal dinner party celebrating his duplication of the Hollands' formula. Moments after giving a toast to prospective immortality, Arcane reveals that he secretly slipped the first dose to Bruno, who begins to convulse. The hulking man's body shrinks to half its size as he grows pointed ears and a misshapen skull. Arcane locks him in a dungeon alongside the Swamp Thing, asking the latter why the experiment failed. The Swamp Thing reveals that the formula does not produce strength, but instead amplifies a person's natural qualities, explaining that Bruno's timidity caused his diminished stature.

After locking Alice in the dungeon with them, Arcane returns to his study and drinks a glass of the formula. A beam of sunlight emitted through the door re-grows the Swamp Thing's missing arm, allowing the creature to free itself, Alice, and Bruno. Upstairs, Arcane transforms into a hairy, boar-like beast and descends to the dungeons. There, he discovers that his captives have escaped through an underwater tunnel leading back to the swamp. Sometime later, Alice and the Swamp Thing emerge from the water, followed closely by Arcane, who stabs Alice with a sword. The Swamp Thing revives Alice and then kills Arcane. The creature turns to leave, but Alice pleads for him to stay so that she can help him rebuild his work. He refuses, but promises to return to her soon. Moments later, Jude emerges from the trees and embraces her as they watch the Swamp Thing lumber away through the marsh.

== Cast ==
- Ray Wise as Alec Holland:
  A scientist developing a formula that will allow for plants to grow in inhospitable environments.
  - Dick Durock portrays Holland as the Swamp Thing.
- Adrienne Barbeau as Alice Cable:
  A researcher brought in to help with the project, and the only survivor following Arcane's attack on the scientists. The character's name is borrowed from comics character Matt Cable.
- Louis Jourdan as Anton Arcane:
  The leader of a paramilitary organization who wishes to control the Hollands' formula for his own purposes. The character takes the place of Nathan Ellery from the original story.
  - Ben Bates as Arcane Monster
- David Hess as Ferret
- Nicholas Worth as Bruno
  - Tommy Madden as Little Bruno
- Don Knight as Harry Ritter
- Al Ruban as Charlie
- Nannette Brown as Dr. Linda Holland:
  Alec's sister and partner on the project, who is killed by Arcane. Her relationship with Alec changed in adaptation from wife to sibling.
- Reggie Batts as Jude
- Mimi Craven as Secretary
- Don Gottesfeld as Commando
- Karen Price as Karen

== Production ==
=== Filming ===
Filming occurred primarily on location in Cypress Gardens, Moncks Corner, South Carolina. It was also filmed at the historic Aiken-Rhett House in Charleston, South Carolina. Wes Craven was proud of delivering the film on time and on budget at $2.5 million.

=== Writing ===
In writing the film, Wes Craven referenced Werner Herzog's 1974 film The Enigma of Kaspar Hauser which was originally called Every Man for Himself and God Against All. Commando (Don Gottesfeld), one of the mercenaries, says the line to a character named Bruno (Nicholas Worth). In Enigma, the lead character Kaspar Hauser was played by Bruno S..

== Release ==
=== Home media ===
Swamp Thing was released on VHS and LaserDisc in 1982 and again in 1986 by Embassy Home Entertainment. In August 2000, Metro-Goldwyn-Mayer re-released the film on VHS and DVD in the United States. Though the DVD was labeled as being the PG-rated, domestic cut of the film, MGM had inadvertently used the 93-minute international cut of the film, which contained more nudity and sexual content than the US theatrical cut. In May 2002, Mary Dorflinger, a Dallas woman, rented the disc from a Blockbuster Video store for her children and reported this discrepancy. MGM recalled the disc and reissued it in August 2005, with the US theatrical cut as originally intended.

Swamp Thing was released in a Blu-ray/DVD combo pack by Shout! Factory on August 6, 2013. The set features the 91-minute cut of the film presented in high definition widescreen format, along with bonus content including interviews with Adrienne Barbeau, Len Wein and Reggie Batts, as well as commentary tracks with Wes Craven and makeup artist Bill Munn. In the UK, the 93-minute cut was released on Blu-ray by 88films on March 25, 2019. MVD Entertainment Group released an Ultra HD Blu-ray edition of Swamp Thing in 2023, which includes both versions of the film.

== Reception ==
=== Critical response ===
Swamp Thing received mixed to positive reviews from critics. On the review aggregator website Rotten Tomatoes, the film has an approval rating of 62% based on 42 reviews, with an average rating of 5.6/10. The site's critical consensus reads: "Unabashedly campy – often to its detriment – Swamp Thing is not without its charms, among them Adrienne Barbeau as the damsel in distress". Metacritic, which uses a weighted average, assigned the film a score of 50 out of 100, based on 10 critics, indicating "mixed or average" reviews. Roger Ebert gave the film three out of four stars.

Author John Kenneth Muir notes that Swamp Thing differs in many respects from Craven's usual work, in that Craven's intent was to show the major Hollywood studios that he could handle action, stunts, and major stars. Craven's usual focus on the problems of family and society was substituted and downplayed in favor of pure entertainment. Nevertheless, Muir points out that some of Craven's usual themes and images do appear in Swamp Thing. For example, as in The Last House on the Left (1972) and The Hills Have Eyes (1977), Craven shows a close connection between the landscape and his characters.

PopMatters journalist J.C. Maçek III wrote: "As much fun as this film can be (and it often is), it's equally often difficult to ignore that Swamp Thing ultimately is, at core, a rubber-suit monster movie". DVD Talk rated the film as 3 stars of 5 stars as "Recommended".

== Comic book ==
The film was adapted in comic form as Swamp Thing Annual #1. The adaptation was written by Bruce Jones and illustrated by Mark Texeira and Tony DeZuniga.

== Sequel ==
A sequel entitled The Return of Swamp Thing was released in 1989.

== Television series ==
In July 1990, USA Network premiered the Swamp Thing television series. This saw Dick Durock reprising his role using a modified version of the Return of Swamp Thing costume. The series took a deliberate turn away from the campy themes of its 1989 film predecessor and leaned toward the darkness of Wes Craven's version. It lasted into 1993 with a total of 72 episodes.

== Animated series ==
A short-lived animated series Swamp Thing was also produced concurrently. It does not share continuity with either the films or the live-action series.

== Cancelled reboot and DCU future ==
In 2009, Joel Silver planned to produce a reboot of the Swamp Thing film franchise from a story written by Akiva Goldsman. In April 2010, Vincenzo Natali was confirmed to direct, but in May he decided to delay the Swamp Thing reboot to pursue other projects.

In 2023, another reboot of Swamp Thing was announced as part of the DC Universe franchise.

== Other appearances ==
Adrienne Barbeau made a guest appearance in the episode "Long Walk Home" of DC Universe's 2019 Swamp Thing series.
