= Black Lightning season 4 =

Black Lightning
- Season 4
- Promotional poster
- Starring: Cress Williams; China Anne McClain; Nafessa Williams; Christine Adams; Marvin "Krondon" Jones III; Jordan Calloway; Chantal Thuy; James Remar
- No. of episodes: 13

Release
- Original network: The CW
- Original release: February 8 – May 24, 2021

Season chronology
- ← Previous; Season 3

The fourth and final season of the American television series Black Lightning, which is based on the DC Comics character Jefferson Pierce / Black Lightning, premiered on The CW on February 8, 2021. The season is produced by Berlanti Productions, Akil Productions, Warner Bros. Television, and DC Entertainment. It is set in the Arrowverse, sharing continuity with the other television series of the franchise. The season was ordered in January 2020 and production began that October, with Salim Akil once again serving as showrunner.

The season continues to follow Jefferson, now a high school principal in his second stint as the superhero Black Lightning, as he fights against local corruption in his community of Freeland. Cress Williams stars as Jefferson, along with principal cast members China Anne McClain, Nafessa Williams, Marvin "Krondon" Jones III, Christine Adams, Jordan Calloway, and James Remar also returning from previous seasons. Laura Kariuki replaces McClain as Jennifer Pierce starting with the fifth episode "The Book of Ruin: Chapter One: Picking Up the Pieces"; McClain, however, returns for the series finale.

== Episodes ==
Black Lightning, season 4 episodes
No. overall	No. in season	Title	Directed by	Written by	Original release date	U.S. viewers (millions)
46	1	"The Book of Reconstruction: Chapter One: Collateral Damage"	Salim Akil	Salim Akil	February 8, 2021	0.52
Jefferson Pierce stops white police officers from hassling a black teenager and erases their memories of the incident as well as the dash cam footage; Peter Gambi has to further erase traffic camera footage. (Note: This season takes place one year after the events of the previous season.) Tobias Whale is in Freeland and now operating as a philanthropist much to the dismay of the Pierce family and Gambi. The 100 is in a turf war with the Kobra Cartel. Jefferson and Lynn each see the therapist Dr. Bowlan. In light of Bill Henderson's death, Mayor Billy Black swears in Ana Lopez as the new chief of police. Thunder and Lightning bust the 100's drug drops, causing Lala to retaliate. Jefferson is later visited by Chief Lopez and Detective Hassan Shakur when his license plate has been identified at the scene of the incident. In Thunder and Lightning's latest bust, one of the 100 operatives uses a special gun on the latter. As Lightning recovers, Jefferson goes after the shooter and cripples him. At Lynn's place of work, she finds that Tobias is now funding it as he pretends to meet her for the first time. After recuperating, Lightning goes flying, but then starts falling.
47	2	"The Book of Reconstruction: Chapter Two: Unacceptable Losses"	Bille Woodruff	Charles D. Holland	February 15, 2021	0.44
While Lala leads the 100, the Kobra Cartel is said to be led by Lady Eve, even though she has not been seen since the Markovian invasion and her underboss Destiny is running it. Monovista International is developing directed-energy guns (DEGs) to kill metahumans. While checking up on the comatose Grace Choi, Anissa meets her co-worker Darius Morgan. During Lightning's outing, she works to break up a shootout between the 100 and the Kobra Cartel which leads to a kid getting killed and Lynn getting wounded. The dead kid is the son of Marcel Payton, who was rendered homeless since the Markovian invasion. He quits his teacher job at Garfield High School. Thanks to his latest serum, Tobias Whale becomes immune to Jefferson's electrical attacks. He later confronts Jefferson. Blackbird calls a parley between Lala and Destiny, stating that the parking lot in which they are meeting is neutral territory where those who were rendered homeless will reside. Unable to convince Gambi to track down the person who shot Marcel's son, Jefferson secretly contacts T.C. instead. They find the culprit, named Lydell Green. Jefferson cripples Lydell and advises him to turn himself over to the police.
48	3	"The Book of Reconstruction: Chapter Three: Despite All My Rage..."	Salim Akil	Brusta Brown & John Mitchell Todd	February 22, 2021	0.37
While streaming an illegal cage fight that he established, Lala kills Lydell. The tattoo of his image then appears on the back of Lala's hand. Grace comes out of her coma. Dr. Darius Morgan uses his ordained minister status to wed her and Anissa. Tobias Whale wants Mayor Black to tear down Garfield High School. Mayor Black refuses to do it, since he attended it and his children are attending it. After Marcel withdraws his resignation and is discovered to be partaking in Lala's illegal cage fights, Jefferson subdues fighter Behemoth. With T.C.'s help, Lightning tracks down the leaker Terry Andrews and gets a selfie with him, leading Lightning to start a social media page. Jefferson lends his old house to Marcel. At a restaurant, Tobias invites Lynn to dine and mentions how his late sister Tori had ALS and would like her to find a cure to further his re-establishment. When Jefferson then arrives and finds Tobias with Lynn.
49	4	"The Book of Reconstruction: Chapter Four: A Light in the Darkness"	Mary Lou Belli	Lamont Magee	March 1, 2021	0.41
Jefferson eventually visits Whale advising him to stay away from his family. Jennifer Pierce and T.C. discover that Jefferson has been in Lala's cage fights. Grace Choi moves back in with Anissa. Whale meets with Mayor Black, Ana Lopez, and Deputy Chief Wesley Robinson about having an event in the neutral territory. Wesley, who is secretly on Lala's side, informs her about the event. Lopez asks detective Hassan Shakur if he is in or out. Jefferson allows Lynn to take up Whale's offer so that they can secretly learn what his next plan is. Gambi works with Lauren Caruso to find a better power source for the DEGs. At the event, where Grace joins Blackbird and Lightning in her new Wylde form, the 100 attacks. Blackbird, Lightning and Wylde repel the 100, who seem to kill Black. Lopez blames their interference on Lightning. Lopez does not know that Tobias secretly had Red kill Black with his powers for declining the demolition of Garfield High School while pinning the blame on the 100. Jefferson apologizes to Jennifer for what Henderson's death caused him to do and for what happened to Black. Jennifer flights out as Lightning and goes into the ionosphere. Her body eventually dissipates and explodes into energy particles.
50	5	"The Book of Ruin: Chapter One: Picking Up the Pieces"	Bille Woodruff	Adam Giaudrone	March 8, 2021	0.46
The Pierce family and Gambi learn what happened. While having arranged for Flash to deliver a part for a machine needed to restore Jennifer, Black Lightning heads into the ionosphere and harvests the energy particles. Then they place the energy in the machine which will put Jennifer back together. While making a reluctant Detective Hassan Shakur the head of the new Meta Task Force, Ana Lopez reports that Lydell Green's dead body was found, and that Lightning is the suspect due to his lightning-based injuries causing Lynn to say something negative to Jefferson. In addition, Lopez reports that the 100 are held accountable for Mayor Black's death and that they have apprehended some of its members. While Destiny calls up Lala for a truce noting that the police will go after the Kobra Cartel next, Black Lightning visits the 100's base as Lala claims that he didn't kill Mayor Black and that they were only trying to target Tobias Whale. Meanwhile, Tobias Whale gets told by Val Seong that a delivery for him was delayed. At the spot where Lala was supposed to meet with Destiny, the Meta Task Force arrives where Lala is briefly killed in a gunfight and the members present are arrested. While the Meta Task Force are distracted arresting Devonte, Lala revives and sneaks away causing a hidden Destiny to call up someone to look for an assassin who deals with metahumans. Grace learns what happened to Anissa and persuades her to be present if Jennifer is restored. At the sanctum, the machine reaches 100% and has restored Jennifer's body. To everyone's surprise, Jennifer gains a different appearance.
51	6	"The Book of Ruin: Chapter Two: Theseus's Ship"	Mary Lou Belli	Jake Waller	March 15, 2021	0.48
Jennifer finds that she looks different as all of Gambi's test state that she is still Jennifer. He and Lynn suspect that the genes had a hand in this. Jefferson has a hard time accepting this as he and Gambi later watch the news about the DEGs being promoted by Tobias, who is announcing his campaign to become the new Mayor of Freeland. After her test on Jennifer, Lynn works on Val Seong to see if she has ALS as Tobias claimed with Lynn claiming the Jennifer in her alias of JJ is her niece. Gambi and Lauren find that promethium would help in the improvement of the DEGs' power source. While checking up on the protection money from her minions, Destiny is ambushed by Lala and some of his men as Destiny summons the assassin Ishmael. He stabs Lala and dumps his body in a cement coffin. Black Lightning visits Detective Hassan Shakur, who got the bullet that killed Mayor Black from evidence and learns that it is magnetic; a magnetic metahuman did it from a far distance. While analyzing Val's blood, Lynn informs Jefferson while also stating that she as a meta-gene. Jefferson has a disagreement with her on using the meta-boosters to find out if she was the one responsible. Jennifer spends time at Anissa's apartment and learns that she and Grace got married. The Freeland Police Department has been issuing no-knock warrants in their hunt for Lala and any metahumans. As Jennifer wants to help her father, Gambi loans her a different outfit while working on a new costume to accommodate her height. When a black man's girlfriend is shot during the conflict, the viewers are shown archive footage of the Black Lives Matter protests until time turns backwards, and the attacking police officers are subdued by Black Lightning. When backup arrives, the police give Black Lightning a hard time when Jennifer, in an improvised version of the Blackbird outfit, shows up to help. Afterwards, Jefferson and Jennifer reach an understanding about the recent changes. Tobias learns about the arrival of Lynn's "niece". With Lala's petrified state on display in her lair, Destiny is told by Ishmael that it would take the deaths of a hundred metahumans to get into the League of Assassins. When she asks how many he killed, Ishmael states 94. She gives him a reason to stick around by having him go after Black Lightning and his allies.
52	7	"Painkiller"	Bille Woodruff	Salim Akil	April 12, 2021	0.39
Anissa and Grace pay a visit to Akashic Valley for their honeymoon. While visiting a bar with Anissa, Grace gets drugged and kidnapped. Anissa catches up to one of the kidnappers when Painkiller arrives and defeats the attacker. Then he proceeds to poison Anissa before Khalil takes over. As Anissa recovers, she meets Khalil's new allies consisting of A.S.A remnant Philky and former Marines medic Donald. While Donald helps Anissa recuperate, Khalil and Philky go on the trail of Grace's kidnappers where they get the information on what they know from a photographer associated with them. While Khalil struggles with his Painkiller side, he learns that the kidnappers work for a woman named Maya. When the location of Grace is found, Khalil and Painkiller come to an agreement to let Painkiller take over should things get difficult. As Painkiller fights the guards of the building, Grace recovers and makes her escape as Wylde. While Painkiller gets the information he needs and is advised by Khalil and Wylde to get out, Maya orders the A.I. Katie to put the building on self-destruct. Khalil and Wylde make it out in time. Now Khalil has plans to find Maya and make her pay for the experiments she's doing. What he doesn't know is that Maya is the daughter of a recuperating Percy Odell.
53	8	"The Book of Ruin: Chapter Three: Things Fall Apart"	Bille Woodruff	André Edmonds	April 19, 2021	0.42
As Anissa and Grace arrive at the Pierce home and are greeted by the family, the house is soon visited by the FBI led by Special Agent Kevin Mason who leads an investigation. This is because Jefferson has been charged with embezzlement. Lynn suspects that Tobias Whale is behind this. After running though her J.J. backstory with Jefferson, Jennifer heads to Garfield High while escorted by T.C. where she meets a new student named Uriah Coleman. Jefferson learns from Marcel that Tobias Whale set him up with a new house. Kyrie is interrogated and killed by Ishmael when he fails to get information about Blackbird. While watching the events unfold, Tobias Whale sends Red to find out from Marshall Bates on why the specific device he asked for hasn't been delivered yet. Using Val's DNA, Lynn gives Gambi a meta-booster where they, Jefferson, and T.C. find out that Val has power-negating abilities. With Anissa finding out about the Center for Gene Therapy and Research planning to make a metahuman cure, Blackbird and Wylde have their encounter with Ishmael who they barely get away from. After Jefferson and Gambi are told by Anissa and Grace about their encounter with Ishmael, the two of them see security footage of Red using his magnetic abilities to intimidate Marshall Bates into finishing the test on the device Tobias wants in 48 hours or he will put a bullet in his head. T.C. contacts Khalil and Philky about the embezzlement charges against Jefferson where Khalil supports the claim that Tobias Whale set him up. Khalil agrees to help Jefferson out.
54	9	"The Book of Ruin: Chapter Four: Lyding"	Keesha Sharp	J. Allen Brown	April 26, 2021	0.32
Lynn discusses her dream to Dr. Bowlan where she killed Jefferson, Anissa, and Jennifer. Lightning shows up to support Uriah's music fundraiser much to the dismay of Jefferson and Gambi when Jefferson was informed by Shakur about it. He advises Jennifer to lie low as the police are after Lightning. Gambi makes Anissa a new Thunder suit which is snap activated due to her sonic-based abilities and can even withstand bullets should she not be able to hold her breath longer. Anissa learns that Darius has been locked out of the system and he will give her the information on the phony cystic fibrosis treatment. Lynn learns from a security guard named Michael that her work privileges have been revoked and her work has been taken by Special Agent Mason who thinks that Jefferson embezzled it on her research. Painkiller visits a gangster named Jesse Gentilucci where Khalil gets the information on where the hidden ledger that Tobias used his payments through is before getting poisoned by Painkiller. Tobias Whale receives the Emitter that Lauren was working on from Marshall Bates who is given hush money and taken away by Red. Val then shows up informing him that they got her DNA samples that Lynn took from her to power the device. Black Lightning attacks a Kobra Cartel member to draw out Ishmael. At her house, Lynn is visited by Special Agent Mason who arrests her for violation of civil rights. She is taken to the Freeland Police Department where she is booked and strip-searched. At Tori Whale's shrine, Tobias Whale activates the combination of the Emitter and Val's DNA. Anissa visits Darius to find him dead in his apartment and her powers don't work when a car comes at her. Black Lightning starts to lose his powers during his fight with Ishmael. T.C. is unable to use his powers to help him get away. After evading the police, Lightning starts to fall to the ground.
55	10	"The Book of Reunification: Chapter One: Revelations"	Benny Boom	Jamila Daniel	May 3, 2021	0.32
In light of Black Lightning's last trip to the ionosphere, T.C. activates a special component in Lightning's suit to keep her from hitting the ground. Grace saves Anissa, and they find the hard drive that Darius was planning to give to Anissa. Gambi activates the stealth part of Black Lightning's suit to engage Ishmael while advising Shakur not to have his men engage before escaping. Back at the sanctum, Gambi uses a prototype to get Jefferson and Lightning out of their suits and works to find the cause of the metahuman abilities not working. Shakur calls Jefferson, saying that Lynn has been arrested. Red helps Tobias test a bracelet that enables Red to use his magnetic abilities. Being snuck in by Shakur, Jefferson talks to Lynn before the FBI comes in. Also summoned to Lynn's side is lawyer Keith Michaels, an ex-boyfriend of hers. Anissa called him in on Lynn's advice. Keith got Lynn bailed. Aided by Philky, T.C. works to decrypt the hard drive. Painkiller obtains the digital ledger that is connected with Tobias. It mentions the people that are on Tobias' payroll. Upon obtaining Lala's petrified form, Tobias intimidates Destiny to cease the gang war with the 100 even when he was revealed to have paid Ishmael more money. Gambi is visited by Lauren about what he did to the Promethium and the Emitter. While Gambi states that he took some of the Promethium to see if he can trust her, he has no knowledge on where the Emitter is and will help her locate it. Jefferson and Lynn are later visited by Gambi. They compare information and come to the conclusion that Tobias is using the Emitter and Val's DNA to negate all the metahuman powers while also trying to figure out where Tobias is holding the harvested meta-genes. Tobias opens a box he was notified of by Katie to chat with a group of people, revealing the status of his plans and his upcoming mayoral candidacy. The people say they are looking forward to his success, which would grant him a seat among them. Performing a electrocution experiment, Lightning gives herself a recharge to go into the ionosphere and fully recharge herself. With T.C.'s guidance, Lightning returns from the ionosphere intact as some energy in the ionosphere lingers.
56	11	"The Book of Reunification: Chapter Two: Trial and Errors"	Bille Woodruff	Asheleigh O. Conley	May 10, 2021	0.30
Lightning procures the meta-genes from one of the warehouses. Suspicious about "J.J.", Tobias Whale has Katie do a scan on her. Keith advises Lynn to make a plea deal. Gambi tells Jefferson that he will find the emitter and shut it down. When Tobias becomes the new Mayor of Freeland, he is visited by Chief Ana Lopez and gives her the meta-boosters and the bracelets that block the power-negating waves. After Lopez leaves, Tobias is informed by Katie that Jennifer and J.J. are the same person. He is later contacted by the Shadow Board who learn of his status. As Anissa informs Lynn about the fake cystic fibrosis, Jefferson suspects that Tobias is resuming where the A.S.A. left off. After contacting Jefferson about the digital ledger, Khalil finds that Looker is involved with Tobias ever since she escaped from A.S.A. custody during the Markovian invasion. After Lynn makes a special serum, Jefferson reveals his identity to Detective Shakur who asks him to trust him like Henderson did. When they meet with Kevin Mason, it turns out that the coffee that Mason drank was spiked with one of Looker's silver substance as it comes out of him and is caught by Jefferson who revealed that Looker was controlling him. As Jennifer meets with Uriah for a date, they are ambushed by Red who kills Uriah and advises Jennifer to stop being Lightning or else more people she loves will die. Now knowing that Jennifer is Lightning, a dying Uriah advises her to light up the world. T.C. is informed about what happened. Khalil finds where Looker is where he defeats her minions and Painkiller poisons her into cooperation. Khalil will give her the rest of the anti-venom once she's done revealing Tobias' plot to the FBI. After apologizing to Lauren, Gambi brings her to look for the stolen emitter and have no luck due to the promethium running through the tunnels. Katie informs Tobias that Jesse Gentilucci's payroll is inactive, Tobias has Katie investigate where he finds that Jesse was poisoned. Finding out that Painkiller was responsible, Tobias contacts Ishmael to kill him.
57	12	"The Book of Resurrection: Chapter One: Crossroads"	Benny Boom	Brusta Brown & John Mitchell Todd	May 17, 2021	0.36
Jefferson finds out about Uriah's death. He also talks with Jennifer where he mentioned how his father Alvin was killed by Tobias Whale. Gambi and Lauren hack into Monovista International where they find that the harvesting project is called Event Horizon. Tobias is contacted by the Shadow Board over his failure to dispose of Lightning causing Tobias to have an assassin kill the member that spoke to him. This causes the other Shadow Board members to bow to him. After hacking Lynn's ankle monitor, Gambi has her work with Lauren where Lynn reveals that her family is a group of metahumans. Chief Ana Lopez meets with Detective Shakur to distribute the meta-boosters and the special bracelets to the members the next time Lightning resurfaces. When Shakur asks his opinion on them, Lopez states that they will have a month to try to take down Lightning without the meta-boosters. As Khalil is driving Looker to the outskirts of Freeland, they are ambushed by Ishmael who is out to kill them both. Painkiller fights Ishmael and manages to kill him by leaking his poison onto the hilt of Ishmael's sword. Then Khalil hands Looker and the other half of the anti-poison to Kevin Mason and Detective Shakur. Jefferson and Gambi work on a device that would be able to erase Tobias' memories of his family's secret identity. After a trip to the ionosphere, Lightning is informed of Red's sighting where she manages to defeat him by breaking his special bracelet. Rather than avenge Uriah, Lightning drops him off to the police while informing Lopez that she had broadcast her threat on a live feed. With her fellow police officers seeing this upon Red's arrest, Lopez decides to use the meta-booster on herself. Anissa and Grace bomb the facility where the meta-genes are stored while also wiping the servers of the information. Jefferson meets Tobias at Alvin's house claiming that he'll give into his deal. Though Tobias intercepts the device and "confesses" that he did kill Alvin before badly beating up Jefferson. Using Jefferson's phone, Tobias calls up Jennifer claiming that her father is dead.
58	13	"The Book of Resurrection: Chapter Two: Closure"	Salim Akil	Charles D. Holland	May 24, 2021	0.50
Gambi and the rest of the Pierce family have been informed on what happened to Jefferson as Gambi located and destroyed the Emitter in the Tori Mausoleum. He, Thunder, and Grace head there and destroy it while fighting the Drakestone security team guarding it. However, Thunder got wounded by a DEG in the process. Detective Shakur finds that Chief Lopez took the meta-booster and is using the electrical abilities she gained from it to start draining Freeland's power grid. Following another trip to the ionosphere, it is revealed that "Lightning" has been an ionosphere entity that stole Jennifer's DNA to make itself a physical body, with all of Jennifer's memories and feelings and abilities. The real Jennifer/Lightning emerges from the ionosphere in her original body and confronts the imposter. They fight until Lightning absorbs the ionosphere entity. Having been buried alive, Jefferson gets contacted by Alvin's ghost, enabling Jefferson to draw energy from the underground promethium crystals to burst from his grave, with the added effect of enhancing his powers. While Lynn tends to Thunder's injury, Lightning and the Meta-Task Force confront Lopez, whom Lightning defeats. Black Lightning confronts Tobias in Tori Tower. During their ensuing fight, the cement block containing Lala gets knocked over. Acting in self-defense, Black Lightning blasts Tobias out a window, where the latter is impaled on a spike. Black Lightning tries to save Tobias, who fires his guns at him, forcing Black Lightning to electrocute Tobias to death. T.C. informs Khalil and Painkiller that there is a way to get rid of the kill code: at the cost of Khalil's/Painkiller's memories of the Pierce family. Khalil and Painkiller agree, and T.C. eliminates the kill code, erasing Khalil's/Painkiller's memories of the Pierce family. The Pierce family, Grace, and T.C. celebrate their victory while being briefed about what occurred. Jefferson is planning to step down as Black Lightning while passing the torch to Thunder, Lightning, and Wylde, content to simply advise them. Jefferson and Lynn also announce they will re-marry each other. Gambi also plans to pass his torch to T.C. while doing some tinkering on the side. After reviving, Lala finds Tobias's corpse and laughs.

== Cast and characters ==
=== Main ===
- Cress Williams as Jefferson Pierce / Black Lightning
- China Anne McClain as Jennifer Pierce / Lightning (episodes 1–4 & 13)
  - Laura Kariuki as The Ionosphere / Jennifer "JJ Stewart" Pierce / Lightning (episodes 5–13; recurring)
- Nafessa Williams as Anissa Pierce / Thunder / Blackbird
- Christine Adams as Lynn Stewart
- Marvin "Krondon" Jones III as Tobias Whale
- Jordan Calloway as Khalil Payne / Painkiller
- Chantal Thuy as Grace Choi / Wylde
- James Remar as Peter Gambi

=== Recurring ===
- William Catlett as Latavius "Lala" Johnson
- Rafael Castillo as Devonte Jones
- Melissa De Sousa as Chief Ana Lopez
- Tommy Kane as John Webb
- Bethann Hardison as Dr. Bowlan
- Todd Anthony as Dr. Darius Morgan
- Kedrick Brown as Marcel Payton
- Jemarcus Kilgore as Montel
- Robert Tinsley as Homeless Mam
- Elena Varela as Lauren Caruso
- Wallace Smith as Detective Hassan Shakur
- Helen Joo Lee as Val Seong
- Matt Roszak as Red
- Christopher A'mmanuel as Baron / T.C.

=== Guest ===
- Reggie Hayes as Mayor Billy Black
- Jason Louder as Frank "Two-Bits" Tanner
- Teesha Renee as Destiny
- Veronika Rowe as Auntie Gina
- Renell Gibbs as Kyrie
- Kelvin Hair as Lydell Green
- Amanda Baker as Rebecca Larson
- Tre' Stokes as Terry Andrews
- Sh'Kia Augustin as the voice of Shonda
- Paden Fallis as Marshall Bates
- Troy Faruk as Deputy Chief Wesley Robinson
- Rico Ball as Ishmael
- Bill Duke as Agent Odell
- Alexander Hodge as Philky
- James Roch as Donald
- Sibongile Mlambo as Maya Odell
- Fantastic Negrito as Fantastic Negrito Hologram
- McKalin Hand as Uriah Coleman
- Jamal Akakpo as Kevin Mason
- Kenneth Trujillo as Jesse Gentilucci
- Will Blagrove as Keith Michaels
- Sofia Vassilieva as Looker
- Jef Holbrook as Party Pic Guy

== Production ==
=== Development ===
On January 7, 2020, The CW renewed the series for its fourth season. On the early renewal of Black Lightning as well as other series, network president Mark Pedowitz released a statement reading, "These early orders for next season give our production teams a head start in plotting out story arcs and a jump on hiring staff, and this also provides us with a strong foundation of established, fan-favorite CW shows to build on for next season." On November 20, 2020, The CW confirmed that the fourth season will be the final season of the series.

=== Casting ===
Main cast members Cress Williams, China Anne McClain, Nafessa Williams, Christine Adams, Marvin "Krondon" Jones III, Jordan Calloway, and James Remar return from previous seasons as Jefferson Pierce / Black Lightning, Jennifer Pierce / Lightning, Anissa Pierce / Thunder, Lynn Stewart, Tobias Whale, Khalil Payne / Painkiller, and Peter Gambi, respectively. This is the first season to not feature Damon Gupton as Billy Henderson. In January 2020, Gupton revealed that Henderson was not in the plans for the fourth season and that the third season would be his last as a series regular. McClain appeared in a limited number of episodes, as she planned to leave the series after the season, ahead of it being announced to be the final season. This led to the fifth episode to have her character recast to Laura Kariuki. McClain, however, returned for the finale.

In November 2020, Chantal Thuy, who portrays Grace Choi, was promoted to a series regular for the fourth season.

=== Filming ===
Filming began in mid-October 2020.

== Release ==
The fourth season premiered on February 8, 2021. After this, episodes began to be released weekly every Monday.

== Reception ==
=== Ratings ===
No DVR ratings are available before the seventh episode.

Viewership and ratings per episode of Black Lightning season 4
No.	Title	Air date	Rating (18–49)	Viewers (millions)	DVR (18–49)	DVR viewers (millions)	Total (18–49)	Total viewers (millions)
7	"Painkiller"	April 12, 2021	0.1	0.39	0.1	0.35	0.2	0.74
8	"The Book of Ruin: Chapter Three: Things Fall Apart"	April 19, 2021	0.1	0.42	0.1	0.30	0.2	0.72
9	"The Book of Ruin: Chapter Four: Lyding"	April 26, 2021	0.1	0.32	0.1	0.27	0.2	0.59
10	"The Book of Reunification: Chapter One: Revelations"	May 3, 2021	0.1	0.32	0.1	0.28	0.2	0.59
11	"The Book of Reunification: Chapter Two: Trial and Errors"	May 10, 2021	0.1	0.30	0.1	0.27	0.2	0.57
12	"The Book of Resurrection: Chapter One: Crossroads"	May 17, 2021	0.1	0.36	0.1	0.31	0.2	0.67
13	"The Book of Resurrection: Chapter Two: Closure"	May 24, 2021	0.2	0.50	0.1	0.30	0.2	0.80
