= List of Black Lightning episodes =

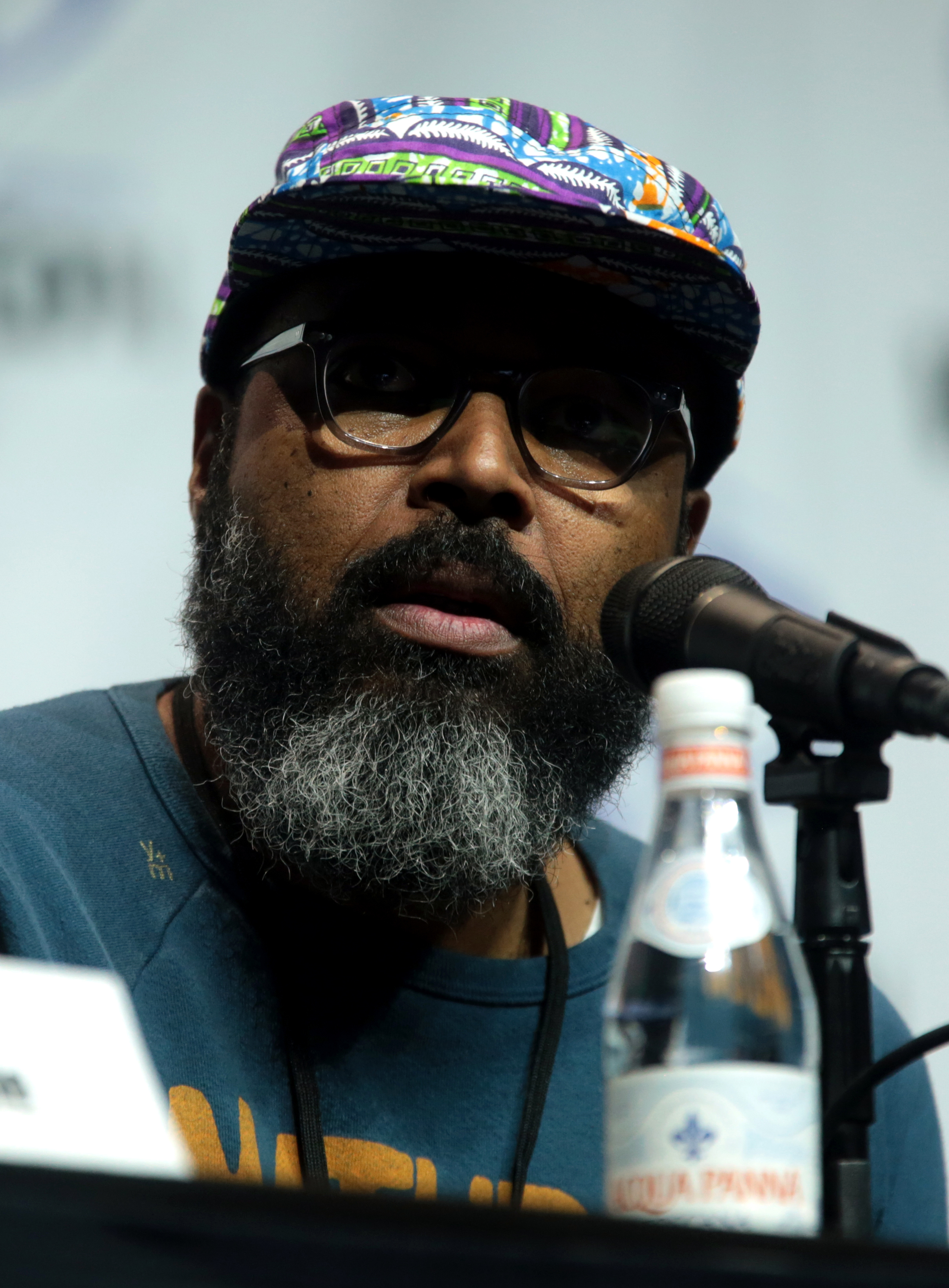
Series creator Salim Akil speaking at the 2018 WonderCon in Anaheim, California

Black Lightning is an American superhero television drama series which ran for four seasons on The CW. It is set in the Arrowverse, sharing continuity with other related television series. The series was created by Salim Akil, based on the character of the same name from DC Comics. Black Lightning follows retired superhero Jefferson Pierce / Black Lightning (Cress Williams) returning to his life as a superhero and the effects of his vigilante activity on his professional and family life.

Alongside Williams, the series stars Christine Adams, Damon Gupton, Marvin Jones III, China Anne McClain, James Remar, and Nafessa Williams. In season two, Jordan Calloway was promoted from recurring to series regular. At the end of the third season, Gupton was written out; he later claimed it was not his decision to depart the series. In the fourth season, Chantal Thuy joined the main cast after recurring in the first three seasons. Prior to the release of season four, McClain, who portrayed Jennifer Pierce, stated that she would return past the expiration of her contract and only agreed to a limited number of season four episodes. Starting with the fifth episode of the season, "The Book of Ruin: Chapter Two", Jennifer was instead portrayed by Laura Kariuki.

During the course of the series, 58 episodes of Black Lightning aired over four seasons. The first season premiered on January 16, 2018, and concluded on April 17. The series was renewed in early April. Season two aired from October 9 through March 18, 2019. The series was renewed for a third season which began airing on October 19 and concluded on March 9, 2020. A fourth season was ordered in January 2020, which, in November of the same year, was confirmed to be the show's last. The fourth and final season premiered on February 8, 2021, with the series finale airing May 24. A spinoff revolving around Calloway as Painkiller was in development but The CW opted against producing a full series.

== Series overview ==
Black Lightning series overview
Season	Episodes	Originally released		Rank	Average viewers (in millions)
Season	Episodes	First released	Last released	Rank	Average viewers (in millions)
1	13	January 16, 2018	April 17, 2018	160	2.73
2	16	October 9, 2018	March 18, 2019	179	1.44
3	16	October 7, 2019	March 9, 2020	130	1.09
4	13	February 8, 2021	May 24, 2021	151	0.74

== Episodes ==
=== Season 1 (2018) ===
Black Lightning, season 1 episodes
No. overall	No. in season	Title	Directed by	Written by	Original release date	U.S. viewers (millions)
1	1	"The Resurrection"	Salim Akil	Salim Akil	January 16, 2018	2.31
2	2	"Lawanda: The Book of Hope"	Oz Scott	Salim Akil	January 23, 2018	1.94
3	3	"Lawanda: The Book of Burial"	Mark Tonderai	Jan Nash	January 30, 2018	2.21
4	4	"Black Jesus"	Michael Schultz	Pat Charles	February 6, 2018	1.88
5	5	"And Then the Devil Brought the Plague: The Book of Green Light"	Rose Troche	Adam Giaudrone	February 13, 2018	1.81
6	6	"Three Sevens: The Book of Thunder"	Benny Boom	Charles Holland	February 27, 2018	1.64
7	7	"Equinox: The Book of Fate"	Bille Woodruff	Lamont Magee	March 6, 2018	1.46
8	8	"The Book of Revelations"	Tanya Hamilton	Jan Nash	March 13, 2018	1.45
9	9	"The Book of Little Black Lies"	Tawnia McKiernan	Keli Goff	March 20, 2018	1.55
10	10	"Sins of the Father: The Book of Redemption"	Eric Laneuville	Pat Charles	March 27, 2018	1.55
11	11	"Black Jesus: The Book of Crucifixion"	Michael Schultz	Melora Rivera	April 3, 2018	1.50
12	12	"The Resurrection and the Light: The Book of Pain"	Oz Scott	Jan Nash & Adam Giaudrone	April 10, 2018	1.54
13	13	"Shadow of Death: The Book of War"	Salim Akil	Charles D. Holland	April 17, 2018	1.68

=== Season 2 (2018–19) ===
Black Lightning, season 2 episodes
No. overall	No. in season	Title	Directed by	Written by	Original release date	U.S. viewers (millions)
14	1	"The Book of Consequences: Chapter One: Rise of the Green Light Babies"	Salim Akil	Salim Akil	October 9, 2018	1.16
15	2	"The Book of Consequences: Chapter Two: Black Jesus Blues"	Oz Scott	Charles D. Holland	October 16, 2018	1.02
16	3	"The Book of Consequences: Chapter Three: Master Lowry"	Rose Troche	Jan Nash	October 23, 2018	1.18
17	4	"The Book of Consequences: Chapter Four: Translucent Freak"	Salli Richardson-Whitfield	Adam Giaudrone	October 30, 2018	0.97
18	5	"The Book of Blood: Chapter One: Requiem"	Michael Schultz	Lamont Magee	November 13, 2018	0.90
19	6	"The Book of Blood: Chapter Two: The Perdi"	Oz Scott	Pat Charles	November 20, 2018	0.99
20	7	"The Book of Blood: Chapter Three: The Sange"	Eric Laneuville	Keli Goff	November 27, 2018	1.06
21	8	"The Book of Rebellion: Chapter One: Exodus"	Tawnia McKiernan	Jake Waller	December 4, 2018	0.96
22	9	"The Book of Rebellion: Chapter Two: Gift of the Magi"	Benny Boom	Adam Giaudrone	December 11, 2018	1.13
23	10	"The Book of Rebellion: Chapter Three: Angelitos Negros"	Salim Akil	Jan Nash & J. Allen Brown	January 21, 2019	0.86
24	11	"The Book of Secrets: Chapter One: Prodigal Son"	Rob Hardy	Pat Charles	January 28, 2019	0.93
25	12	"The Book of Secrets: Chapter Two: Just and Unjust"	Jeff Byrd	Charles D. Holland	February 4, 2019	0.95
26	13	"The Book of Secrets: Chapter Three: Pillar of Fire"	Robert Townsend	Lamont Magee	February 11, 2019	0.94
27	14	"The Book of Secrets: Chapter Four: Original Sin"	Oz Scott	Pat Charles & Keli Goff	March 4, 2019	0.77
28	15	"The Book of the Apocalypse: Chapter One: The Alpha"	Salim Akil	Jan Nash	March 11, 2019	0.75
29	16	"The Book of the Apocalypse: Chapter Two: The Omega"	Salim Akil	Charles D. Holland	March 18, 2019	0.85

=== Season 3 (2019–20) ===
Black Lightning, season 3 episodes
No. overall	No. in season	Title	Directed by	Written by	Original release date	U.S. viewers (millions)
30	1	"The Book of Occupation: Chapter One: Birth of Blackbird"	Salim Akil	Salim Akil	October 7, 2019	0.89
31	2	"The Book of Occupation: Chapter Two: Maryam's Tasbih"	Oz Scott	Charles D. Holland	October 14, 2019	0.63
32	3	"The Book of Occupation: Chapter Three: Agent Odell's Pipe-Dream"	Benny Boom	Pat Charles	October 21, 2019	0.61
33	4	"The Book of Occupation: Chapter Four: Lynn's Ouroboros"	Mary Lou Belli	Adam Giaudrone	October 28, 2019	0.52
34	5	"The Book of Occupation: Chapter Five: Requiem for Tavon"	Robert Townsend	Brusta Brown & John Mitchell Todd	November 11, 2019	0.71
35	6	"The Book of Resistance: Chapter One: Knocking on Heaven's Door"	Jeff Byrd	Lamont Magee	November 18, 2019	0.62
36	7	"The Book of Resistance: Chapter Two: Henderson's Opus"	Oz Scott	Lynelle White	November 25, 2019	0.65
37	8	"The Book of Resistance: Chapter Three: The Battle of Franklin Terrace"	Neema Barnette	Jake Waller	December 2, 2019	0.60
38	9	"The Book of Resistance: Chapter Four: Earth Crisis" (Note: The episode was originally titled "The Book of Resistance: Chapter Four: Third Stone From the Sun".)	Tasha Smith	Lamont Magee	December 9, 2019	0.90
39	10	"The Book of Markovia: Chapter One: Blessings and Curses Reborn"	Eric Laneuville	J. Allen Brown	January 20, 2020	0.54
40	11	"The Book of Markovia: Chapter Two: Lynn's Addiction"	Michael Schultz	André Edmonds	January 27, 2020	0.66
41	12	"The Book of Markovia: Chapter Three: Motherless ID"	Bille Woodruff	Adam Giaudrone & Lynelle White	February 3, 2020	0.72
42	13	"The Book of Markovia: Chapter Four: Grab the Strap"	Salim Akil	Charles D. Holland & Asheleigh O. Conley	February 10, 2020	0.65
43	14	"The Book of War: Chapter One: Homecoming"	Benny Boom	Brusta Brown & John Mitchell Todd	February 24, 2020	0.64
44	15	"The Book of War: Chapter Two: Freedom Ain't Free"	Oz Scott	Pat Charles	March 2, 2020	0.62
45	16	"The Book of War: Chapter Three: Liberation"	Salim Akil	Charles D. Holland	March 9, 2020	0.55

=== Season 4 (2021) ===
Black Lightning, season 4 episodes
No. overall	No. in season	Title	Directed by	Written by	Original release date	U.S. viewers (millions)
46	1	"The Book of Reconstruction: Chapter One: Collateral Damage"	Salim Akil	Salim Akil	February 8, 2021	0.52
47	2	"The Book of Reconstruction: Chapter Two: Unacceptable Losses"	Bille Woodruff	Charles D. Holland	February 15, 2021	0.44
48	3	"The Book of Reconstruction: Chapter Three: Despite All My Rage..."	Salim Akil	Brusta Brown & John Mitchell Todd	February 22, 2021	0.37
49	4	"The Book of Reconstruction: Chapter Four: A Light in the Darkness"	Mary Lou Belli	Lamont Magee	March 1, 2021	0.41
50	5	"The Book of Ruin: Chapter One: Picking Up the Pieces"	Bille Woodruff	Adam Giaudrone	March 8, 2021	0.46
51	6	"The Book of Ruin: Chapter Two: Theseus's Ship"	Mary Lou Belli	Jake Waller	March 15, 2021	0.48
52	7	"Painkiller"	Bille Woodruff	Salim Akil	April 12, 2021	0.39
53	8	"The Book of Ruin: Chapter Three: Things Fall Apart"	Bille Woodruff	André Edmonds	April 19, 2021	0.42
54	9	"The Book of Ruin: Chapter Four: Lyding"	Keesha Sharp	J. Allen Brown	April 26, 2021	0.32
55	10	"The Book of Reunification: Chapter One: Revelations"	Benny Boom	Jamila Daniel	May 3, 2021	0.32
56	11	"The Book of Reunification: Chapter Two: Trial and Errors"	Bille Woodruff	Asheleigh O. Conley	May 10, 2021	0.30
57	12	"The Book of Resurrection: Chapter One: Crossroads"	Benny Boom	Brusta Brown & John Mitchell Todd	May 17, 2021	0.36
58	13	"The Book of Resurrection: Chapter Two: Closure"	Salim Akil	Charles D. Holland	May 24, 2021	0.50

== Ratings ==
Black Lightning : U.S. viewers per episode (millions)

Season	Episode number															
Season	1	2	3	4	5	6	7	8	9	10	11	12	13	14	15	16
1	2.31	1.94	2.21	1.88	1.81	1.64	1.46	1.45	1.55	1.55	1.50	1.54	1.68	–		
2	1.16	1.02	1.18	0.97	0.90	0.99	1.06	0.96	1.13	0.86	0.93	0.94	0.94	0.77	0.75	0.85
3	0.89	0.63	0.61	0.52	0.71	0.62	0.65	0.60	0.90	0.54	0.66	0.72	0.65	0.64	0.62	0.55
4	0.52	0.44	0.37	0.41	0.46	0.48	0.39	0.42	0.32	0.32	0.30	0.36	0.50	–		

Audience measurement performed by Nielsen Media Research (Note: First season; Second season; Third season; Fourth season)
