= Painkiller (comics) =

Fictional character in DC Comics

- Painkiller as depicted in Black Lightning vol. 2 #2 (March 1995). Art by Eddy Newell (penciler), Ron McCain (inker), Matt Hollingsworth (colorist), and Albert DeGuzman (letterer).

Publication information
- Publisher: DC Comics
- First appearance: Black Lightning, Vol. 2 #2 (March 1995)
- Created by: Jenny Blake Isabella; Eddie Newell

In-story information
- Alter ego: Unknown
- Species: Metahuman
- Place of origin: New Earth
- Abilities: Enhanced strength

Painkiller is a supervillain appearing in American comic books published by DC Comics. The character, created by writer Jenny Blake Isabella and artist Eddie Newell, debuted in Black Lightning, Vol. 2 #2 (March 1995). The character is depicted as an enemy of Black Lightning.

Jordan Calloway portrays a variation of Painkiller in The CW's live-action Arrowverse television series Black Lightning.

== Publication history ==
Painkiller debuted in Black Lightning (vol. 2) #2 (March 1995), and was written by Jenny Blake Isabella and illustrated by Eddie Newell. The character was killed off two issues later in Black Lightning #4 (May 1995).

== Fictional character biography ==
Painkiller, a high-level mob enforcer, is hired by the Brothers Who Rule to stop Black Lightning's pursuit of them. Painkiller sets a trap for Black Lightning as well as the cops, a crack house full of teenagers, where he plans to kill Black Lightning and force the cops to open fire on the teenagers. However, Black Lightning's powers provide a level of protection from Painkiller's abilities and Black Lightning is able to prevent the massacre before battling with Painkiller, a battle that ends in Painkiller's death.

== Powers and abilities ==
As a metahuman, Painkiller exhibits superhuman strength and can induce anesthetization on any part of the human body, thus dulling the senses of his victims. He is also a skilled fighter and has knives on the ends of his dreadlocks which he uses as additional weapons.

== In other media ==
Painkiller appears in Black Lightning, portrayed by Jordan Calloway. This version is Khalil Payne, a high school track star and boyfriend of Jennifer Pierce from Freeland who was paralyzed after getting caught in the crossfire of the 100's attack on a peace march against them. Embittered and depressed, he breaks up with Jennifer, drops out of school, and is convinced by the 100's leader Tobias Whale into working for him as his right hand in exchange for the ability to walk. Khalil receives cybernetic enhancements that grant enhanced strength and arm-mounted dart launchers that fire paralytic darts, and takes the name "Painkiller". In the second season, Khalil refuses to carry out a hit and goes on the run with Jennifer after Whale places a bounty on him. Khalil is later killed by Whale, but is resurrected by the A.S.A. In the third season, Khalil is forced to serve the A.S.A. after being implanted with an obedience chip until Jennifer and T.C. nullify his Painkiller programming. In the fourth season, Khalil begins operating in Akashic Valley, having reached an agreement with his Painkiller persona.

- Calloway was set to reprise his role as Painkiller in a self-titled spin-off series, in which he is described to have undergone a transformation from a supervillain to someone who strives to "bring justice where he once gave out punishment" while simultaneously struggling to deal with and harness his Painkiller side. A backdoor pilot aired in the aforementioned fourth season of Black Lightning, but the project was shelved in May 2021.
