= Nicole Gordon =

Nicole Gordon may refer to:

- Nicole Gordon (Pretty Little Liars)
- Nicole Gordon (badminton) (born 1976), badminton player from New Zealand
- Nicole Gordon, fictional character played by Nafessa Williams
