= Lightning (DC Comics) =

- Jennifer Pierce as Lightning, as she appeared in The Other History of the DC Universe #5 (July 2021). Art by Giuseppe Camuncoli (pencils), Andrea Cucchi (inks), and Jose Vallarrubia (colors).

Publication information
- Publisher: DC Comics
- First appearance: Kingdom Come #1 (1996)
- Created by: Mark Waid (writer); Alex Ross (artist); Geoff Johns (writer); Dale Eaglesham (artist)

In-story information
- Full name: Jennifer Pierce
- Species: Metahuman
- Team affiliations: Justice League; Justice Society of America
- Abilities: Electric generation and manipulation; Flight; Plasmakinesis; Photokinesis; Electric detection

Lightning (Jennifer Pierce) is a fictional superhero appearing in American comic books published by DC Comics. Not pinpointed with direct reference, Lightning first appears in the miniseries Kingdom Come in 1996, written by Mark Waid and illustrated by Alex Ross. The character is given official introduction in Justice Society of America vol. 3 #12 (March 2008), written by Geoff Johns and illustrated by Dale Eaglesham in the Modern Age of Comic Books.

Jennifer Pierce is a metahuman, the second child of superhero Black Lightning, and the younger sister of Anissa Pierce, the heroine known as Thunder. Forbidden to use their abilities until completing their educations, Pierce was put in contact and later becomes a member of the superhero team the Justice Society of America. Her father orchestrates this so Jennifer would not endure the hardships her sister did while transitioning into crimefighting. She possesses abilities similar to her father's of electrical generation and manipulation as well as flight. Thus far in her narrative, Pierce has not gained full control of her abilities.

Along with comic books, Lightning has made appearances in various television shows and the character was portrayed by China Anne McClain in the live-action Arrowverse series Black Lightning, with Laura Kariuki taking over the role in the middle of the final season, until McClain returned in the final episode of the series.

== Publication history ==
Lightning first appears in the DC Comics miniseries Kingdom Come by Mark Waid and Alex Ross, a tale of a dystopian possible future. She is among the lawless generation of superheroes who arise after the retirement of Superman. Though not identified within the story, supplemental material in the collected edition of the series refers to her as "Black Lightning's metahuman daughter." During the course of the story, Lightning joins forces with Batman's covert team of heroes as they attempt to reclaim Earth.

A version of Lightning is later introduced into the mainstream DC Comics universe by Geoff Johns and Dale Eaglesham, debuting in Justice Society of America (vol. 3) #12 (March 2008).

== Fictional character biography ==
Jennifer Pierce is the younger daughter of the superhero Black Lightning (Jefferson Pierce) and his ex-wife Lynn Stewart. She inherits a metagene from her father which causes her to manifest superpowers when she becomes a teenager. However, like her father in his youth, she lacks the ability to properly control her electrical powers. This results in the shorting out of any electronic device that she touches. This side effect has left her feeling alienated and freakish among her peers, who have access to cell phones, televisions, the internet, and other conveniences of the modern world.

Jefferson initially forbids his daughters from following in his footsteps as a costumed hero until after they complete their education. After seeing the rough road that his eldest daughter Anissa follows when she disobeys this order as the heroine Thunder, Jefferson decides that Jennifer will need guidance. He contacts the Justice Society of America, who are in the middle of a recruitment drive.

Upon joining the Justice Society, Jennifer immediately forms a bond with fellow teen heroines Stargirl and Cyclone. She also attracts the romantic interests of Jakeem Thunder, another younger member of the team. Jennifer is at first unsure of a superhero codename, believing that her sister will "kill her" if she adopts the name Lightning as a counterpoint to Anissa's own. Nonetheless, this is the name she eventually settles on when she first goes into battle with the JSA.

=== Blackest Night/Brightest Day ===
During the events of Blackest Night, Jennifer is seen desperately trying to fight off the Black Lantern invasion of Manhattan alongside her teammates. Lightning is shown on the cover of the JLA/JSA crossover, battling a crazed Alan Scott alongside her teammates and the Justice League. Writer James Robinson mentioned that he specifically wanted to use Jennifer, and that he considers her "a very underused, but great character".

She later appears alongside fellow teen superheroines Stargirl, Supergirl, and Batgirl, as part of a team of heroines created by Wonder Woman to repel an alien invasion of Washington D.C.

Lightning later plays a key role during the team's first encounter with the new villain Scythe, using her electrical abilities to help defeat him. When the JSA chooses to stay and help rebuild the city of Monument Point (which had suffered massive amounts of damage during the battle with Scythe), Lightning is attacked and nearly killed by a villain named Doctor Chaos, but she is eventually revived by Doctor Fate. Chaos had been hired to evict all heroes from Monument Point.

When the members of the JSA arrive at the home of Anissa Pierce and her girlfriend Grace in an attempt to arrest the fugitive Black Lightning, Lightning sides with her teammates and engages in a brawl with her sister. It is revealed that there is apparently some friction between the two siblings, with Anissa stating that Jennifer was always considered the favorite while also expressing jealousy over Jennifer being allowed to pursue heroics at such a young age. Doctor Fate eventually breaks up the fight, and Black Lightning turns himself over to the authorities.

=== DC All In ===
During the DC All In era, Jennifer is recruited into the Justice League following Amanda Waller's assault on the metahuman community in Absolute Power, and is shown to have developed friendships with her fellow young Justice Leaguers Cyclone (Maxine Hunkel), Signal (Duke Thomas), Blue Beetle (Jaime Reyes), Aquaman (Jackson Hyde), Stargirl (Courtney Whitmore) and Kid Flash (Ace West). She also works alongside her father, sister, Grace, and new electricity-generating metahuman Isaac Mitchell.

== Powers and abilities ==
Like her father, Lightning possesses the power of electricity manipulation. She is able to generate electrical energy and project it as concentrated bolts from her hands. Lightning is also able to fly by generating a localized electromagnetic repulsion field. When manifesting her powers, Jennifer's body is surrounded by a glowing electrical aura with lightning-like spikes on her head and back. This effect is involuntary, though she has demonstrated the ability to revert to a more human appearance. She is also able to absorb electromagnetic energy from the atmosphere.

Still a young inexperienced heroine, Lightning does not have full control of her powers and will short out any electronic device or appliance she touches.

== In other media ==
=== Television ===
- An adolescent Lightning appears in the "Thunder and Lightning" segment of DC Nation Shorts, voiced by Masasa Moyo.
- Jennifer Pierce appears in Black Lightning, portrayed by China Anne McClain as a teenager and Fallyn Brown as a child. Late into the first season, her powers emerge amidst an argument with her sister Anissa Pierce. In the second season, Peter Gambi asks a psionic metahuman contact of his named Perenna to help Jennifer control her powers. By the end of the season, Jennifer acquires a super suit and adopts the codename "Lightning". In the fourth season, Jennifer explodes while traveling to the ionosphere. While her father Black Lightning successfully gathers all of the resulting energy particles so Gambi can restore her, an ionospheric entity (portrayed by Laura Kariuki) who stole Jennifer's DNA to create a body for herself and left her for dead emerges in her place and assumes her identity until Jennifer returns in the series finale to absorb the imposter and rejoin her family.
  - Additionally, two alternate universe versions of Jennifer, Gen of Earth-1 and Jinn of Earth-2, appear in the episode "The Book of Resistance: Chapter Four: Earth Crisis", also portrayed by McClain.
- A young Jennifer Pierce makes cameo appearances in Young Justice.
- Lightning will appear in Super Powers.

=== Miscellaneous ===
Lightning makes cameo appearances in DC Super Hero Girls, voiced by Kimberly Brooks.
