= Black Lightning (TV series) =

American superhero television series

- Genre: Action; Crime drama; Science fiction; Superhero
- Based on: Black Lightning by: Jenny Blake Isabella; Trevor Von Eeden
- Developed by: Salim Akil
- Showrunner: Salim Akil
- Starring: Cress Williams; China Anne McClain; Nafessa Williams; Christine Adams; Marvin "Krondon" Jones III; Damon Gupton; James Remar; Jordan Calloway; Chantal Thuy
- Opening theme: "Black Lightning" by Godholly
- Composer: Kurt Farquhar
- Country of origin: United States
- Original language: English
- No. of seasons: 4
- No. of episodes: 58 (list of episodes)

Production
- Executive producers: Sarah Schechter; Greg Berlanti; Mara Brock Akil; Salim Akil; Oz Scott; Pascal Verschooris; Charles D. Holland
- Producer: Robert West
- Production location: Atlanta, Georgia
- Camera setup: Single-camera
- Running time: 39–43 minutes
- Production companies: Berlanti Productions; Akil Productions; DC Entertainment; Warner Bros. Television

Original release
- Network: The CW
- Release: January 16, 2018 – May 24, 2021

Related
- Arrowverse

Black Lightning is an American superhero drama television series, developed by Salim Akil, that premiered on The CW on January 16, 2018, and concluded on May 24, 2021. It is based on the character of the same name, created by Jenny Blake Isabella with Trevor Von Eeden, featured in publications of DC Comics. Cress Williams stars as the titular character alongside China Anne McClain, Nafessa Williams, Christine Adams, Marvin "Krondon" Jones III, Damon Gupton, James Remar, Jordan Calloway, and Chantal Thuy. The series sees the retired Black Lightning return to his life as a superhero and follows the effects of his vigilante activity on his professional and family life.

Originally in development at Fox, the project was given a pilot production commitment in September 2016. In February 2017, Fox passed on the project and The CW subsequently picked it up with an order for a new pilot script. The CW officially ordered Black Lightning to series in May 2017. The first season premiered on January 16, 2018, and ran for 13 episodes. In April 2018, The CW renewed the series for a second season, which premiered on October 9, 2018, and ran for 16 episodes.

The show's third season, which premiered on October 7, 2019, featured the series' first tie-ins with the network's other DC Comics television series, known collectively as the Arrowverse, leading into Williams' appearance as Black Lightning in their "Crisis on Infinite Earths" crossover event, which resulted in the series' setting merging with that of the other Arrowverse shows. The fourth and final season premiered on February 8, 2021, ending on May 24, 2021.

== Series overview ==
The series focuses on Jefferson Pierce, the principal of Garfield High School in the city of Freeland, Georgia. Nine years ago, he was a superhero called Black Lightning, but he retired when that life negatively impacted his ex-wife Lynn Stewart and his daughters Anissa and Jennifer. Jefferson is forced to become Black Lightning again when associates of The 100, Freeland's most feared criminal gang led by Tobias Whale, kidnap Anissa and Jennifer. After the incident, Anissa starts to develop her abilities and becomes Thunder while Jennifer starts to develop her own electrical abilities. In addition, Jennifer's boyfriend Khalil Payne is corrupted by Whale and is forced to undergo cybernetic enhancements after a gunshot wound leaves him paraplegic. Following a showdown between Jennifer and a corrupt A.S.A. agent, Whale acquires the contents of an A.S.A. briefcase.

In season two, Jennifer works to improve her powers as Whale works to translate the contents of the briefcase. Freeland Police Inspector Henderson discovers Jefferson and Anissa's superhero identities, but secretly allows them to continue their fight against the 100. Meanwhile, Lynn works with Markovian scientist Helga Jace on young metahumans being held by A.S.A. Agent Odell. Stewart is unaware that the project benefits Whale. Following Khalil's apparent death, Jennifer becomes Lightning to help her father. Whale manages to get some of the contents translated which leads to him getting control of the Masters of Disaster. As Jefferson and Jennifer defeat Tobias, who is later incarcerated in the Pit, Jace is handed over of Henderson and is later taken back to Markovia by the teleporting bounty hunter Instant. As the Pierces celebrate their victory, Odell reveals that he knows their secret identities. He tells them that the Markovians are coming to Freeland and that the A.S.A. is swearing them in for the inevitable war.

In season three, the A.S.A. imposes martial law on Freeland while covering up to the media that there is a SARS outbreak. Having some of the people who are suspected metahumans placed in the A.S.A.'s facility, Odell plans to weaponize those who have metahuman abilities while having Commander Carson Williams, Major Sara Grey, and Sergeant Gardner Grayle working for him to impose the martial law. To make matters worse, Odell had Khalil revived and reprogrammed to serve him. While having been given a new suit by Odell, Jefferson does help against the Markovian soldiers working under Colonel Yuri Mosin. Lynn continues to work with the pod kids while getting bone marrow samples from an incarcerated Tobias while Jennifer meets a geokinetic metahuman named Brandon. After an incident that merges Jefferson's Earth with Earth-1 and Earth-38, the Markovians managed to abduct Lynn and Tobias so that she can stabilize the metahumans in their possession. The delays cause Mosin's superiors to send their metahuman operative Gravedigger to take over the operation and use his mind control ability to make Lynn work faster. Jefferson rescues her with the help of Anissa, Jennifer, Brandon, Grayle, T.C., Khalil, and Erica Moran while taking Helga Jace with them, but Tobias is left behind. When Gravedigger and the Markovians begin their invasion of Freeland, Odell orders Commander Williams and Major Grey to purge Freeland of those involved with the A.S.A. Henderson ends up in a mutual kill with a Markovian soldier when saving Black Lightning. While Commander Williams was killed by Lynn in self-defense and Major Grey was killed during her group's shootout with Peter and T.C., Jefferson defeats Gravedigger while Khalil thwarts Odell's departure and Tobias' plans to get access to Markovia's metahumans. Though Markovia's prime minister denies what happened in Freeland, the Pierces present the briefcase to a congressional committee as evidence of their and the A.S.A.'s experiments unaware that Gravedigger survived the Pit's self-destruct sequence.

One year later in season four, Jefferson has stopped being Black Lightning. The 100 is in a turf war with the Kobra Cartel. Tobias is now working as a philanthropist much to the Pierces and Gambi's dismay. In light of Henderson's death, Mayor Billy Black swears in Ana Lopez as the new chief of police. Tobias causes trouble for Jefferson and his allies, such as having Black killed. Kobra enlists the assassin Ishmael to target Jefferson's allies and get the remaining kills he needs to join the League of Assassins.

== Episodes ==
Black Lightning series overview
Season	Episodes	Originally released		Rank	Average viewers (in millions)
Season	Episodes	First released	Last released	Rank	Average viewers (in millions)
1	13	January 16, 2018	April 17, 2018	160	2.73
2	16	October 9, 2018	March 18, 2019	179	1.44
3	16	October 7, 2019	March 9, 2020	130	1.09
4	13	February 8, 2021	May 24, 2021	151	0.74

== Cast and characters ==
- Cress Williams as Jefferson Pierce / Black Lightning:
  The principal of a charter school and, secretly, a retired superhero with the ability to harness and manipulate electricity as well as enhanced strength. He returns to fighting crime as Black Lightning after his daughters are kidnapped by a local gang. Kaden Washington Lewis portrays a young Jefferson Pierce.
- China Anne McClain and Laura Kariuki (recurring: season 4) as Jennifer Pierce / Lightning:
  Jefferson's younger daughter, "an independent, outspoken scholar-athlete with a wild streak of her own" who is a student at Garfield High. Fallyn Brown portrays a young Jennifer Pierce.
- Nafessa Williams as Anissa Pierce / Thunder / Blackbird:
  Jefferson's "passionate and quick-witted" elder daughter who is in medical school and teaches part-time at Garfield High. Also a metahuman, Anissa has the ability to manipulate her density with her breathing, endowing herself with superhuman strength and durability. She can also create powerful thunderlike shockwaves and has an accelerated healing factor. Discussing her character becoming the first black lesbian superhero on television, Williams said, "I'm just really grateful to tell the story for young lesbians — and black lesbians in particular. My hope is that when you watch Anissa, a young lesbian is inspired to walk boldly as who she is and to love herself and to love herself exactly how she looks."
- Christine Adams as Lynn Stewart:
  A neuroscientist focusing on metahuman studies and Jefferson's ex-wife who also serves as his love interest.
- Marvin "Krondon" Jones III as Tobias Whale:
  An African-American man with albinism and Black Lightning's nemesis.
- Damon Gupton as Bill Henderson (seasons 1–3):
  A veteran inspector and the highest-ranking detective on the force who later becomes deputy chief of the Freeland Police Department.
- James Remar as Peter Gambi:
  Jefferson's oldest friend who became a father figure and mentor to him following his father's death.
- Jordan Calloway as Khalil Payne / Painkiller (season 2–4; recurring: season 1):
  A student at Garfield High and Jennifer's love interest who encourages her against her more rebellious tendencies.
- Chantal Thuy as Grace Choi (season 4; recurring: seasons 1–3):
  A bartender who becomes Anissa's girlfriend. She is a metahuman with shapeshifting abilities.

== Production ==
=== Development ===
In September 2016, after going through several incarnations and various stages of development for over a year, Mara Brock Akil, her husband Salim Akil, and perennial Warner Bros. Television producer Greg Berlanti began pitching Black Lightning to television networks. The Akils wrote the script while serving as executive producers alongside Berlanti and his frequent collaborator Sarah Schechter. A week later, the project landed at Fox with a pilot production commitment. In February 2017, Fox opted to not go forward with the pilot, deciding that it was "not a good fit into its already crowded genre drama space" and the project was subsequently shopped to other networks. As the home to several of Berlanti's other television ventures, The CW emerged as the network that was likely to realize the series. The following day, The CW officially ordered a pilot for Black Lightning. The original pilot script that had been written for Fox was discarded and instead, a short presentation was shot ahead of the network's final decisions regarding pickup orders.

The CW officially ordered Black Lightning to series on May 10, 2017, with Salim Akil to serve as showrunner. On April 2, 2018, The CW renewed the series for a second season, which premiered on October 9, 2018. On January 31, 2019, The CW renewed the series for a third season, which premiered on October 7, 2019. On January 7, 2020, the series was renewed for a fourth season, which premiered on February 8, 2021. On November 20, 2020, The CW confirmed that the fourth season will be the final season of the series.

=== Writing ===
In order to have an "authentic black voice" for its setting and characters, Black Lightning utilizes a predominantly African-American writing staff. Salim Akil shared that the writers are not all African-American but "have either lived this life or know someone who has." In writing the first season, showrunner Akil stated that he was most inspired by the original run of Black Lightning comic books and that Black Lightning being a black father who defies the "deadbeat stereotype" was part of the reason for the Akils wanting to tell his story. He described Jefferson and his family as "the Obamas of the superhero world" and compared the duality of Jefferson Pierce and his alter ego Black Lightning to the duality of Martin Luther King Jr. and Malcolm X. As a character-driven family drama, Black Lightning does not follow a villain of the week format in order to better explore the characters, especially the villains. The Akils also indicated that the writers would not be treating LGBTQ representation as a "special issue" but that such characters would be included and depicted "the way anyone would be included in life." Salim Akil noted that topics such as the Black Lives Matter movement and other issues concerning race relations and police brutality would be addressed, but stressed that, "This is an American story, this is not a black story. We're going to be culturally specific, but universal in our themes so everyone can see themselves in these stories." The showrunner likened the narrative of the first season to the real story of the Tuskegee experiment.

The second season is organized into smaller arcs known as "books" to mimic the style of the comic book source material, with "consequences" being the theme of the season's first book. Specifically, Salim Akil said that the season would "deal with the consequences of having discovered the pod children; the consequences of Green Light hitting the streets; and the consequences of Jefferson's daughters discovering they have powers." Furthering the season's objective to "give a nod to comic books in a stronger way," the season introduces more metahumans, though showrunner Akil commented, "I don't want to introduce too many villains. I want us to settle in now that we know everyone [...] so now we can really tell some grounded stories about our villains, our heroes, the people in Freeland." He said that there would additionally be "other forces in Freeland and outside of Freeland" that would come into play as sources of conflict. Lead actor Cress Williams described the season as "harder hitting and a little bit darker" than the series' debut outing. On the relevant social issues that the season would address, Akil stated, "I wanted to talk about black people and therapy. We don't believe in that shit, but we're the number one people who need it." Meanwhile, Nafessa Williams shared that her character would continue to embrace her powers, elaborating that Anissa now "feels confident navigating the superhero world without her father, and she feels fully confident and able to do it on her own."

The third season's narrative begins approximately a month and a half after the season two finale. Cress Williams shared that the season would see the world of the series "getting bigger" in terms of its setting and characters. Salim Akil stated that, while everyday life in Freeland would still be a focus of the season, "we want our stories to talk about concerns not just for black folk but for people in general. We'll cover mental health and addiction issues that affect the whole country." Discussing Jennifer's ongoing struggle to control her newly discovered abilities, actress China Anne McClain noted that, "When the season starts, we see that Jennifer is getting more powerful, stronger, and she's also getting more emotional. We can expect a combination of all three of those this season." Akil additionally disclosed that Jennifer being stronger than both her father and her sister on account of her unique ability to generate her own electricity would also raise the issue of who is ultimately in control amongst the three. Meanwhile, Nafessa Williams said of her character Anissa's journey, "Season one was about her understanding and discovering her powers, in season two she is kind of starting to perfect them and trust herself. Season three, [...] her ways of doing things and her mindset is different from her father's." Furthermore, Williams teased that Jefferson would be making "a really big sacrifice" this season that would reveal "a little bit more of his angrier side" and "[propel] him at the beginning of the season."

=== Casting ===
On February 24, 2017, Cress Williams was announced in the lead role of Jefferson Pierce / Black Lightning. On March 2, China Anne McClain and Nafessa Williams were cast as Jefferson's daughters, Jennifer Pierce and Anissa Pierce, respectively. Later that same month on March 10, it was reported that Christine Adams has been cast as Lynn Stewart, Jefferson's ex-wife. At the 2017 San Diego Comic-Con on July 22, it was revealed that James Remar and Damon Gupton had joined the main cast as Jefferson's oldest friend Peter Gambi and unlikely ally Inspector William "Bill" Henderson, respectively. On August 10, rapper Marvin "Krondon" Jones III was added as a series regular, landing the role of main antagonist Tobias Whale. At the 2018 San Diego Comic-Con on July 21, it was announced that Jordan Calloway had been promoted to a series regular for the second season after previously recurring during the first season as Khalil Payne / Painkiller.

On September 26, 2017, it was announced that Kyanna Simone Simpson would recur as Kiesha, Henderson's daughter and Jennifer's best friend. On October 5, it was reported that Jill Scott had been cast as Lady Eve. Later that month on October 12, Edwina Findley also joined the cast in a recurring capacity as Tori Whale, Tobias' younger sister. Chantal Thuy was added to the recurring cast as Grace Choi that same month on October 30, though she ultimately appeared in only two episodes of the series' first season. On January 16, 2018, it was revealed that Skye P. Marshall had been cast in a recurring role as Kara Fowdy, the vice principal of Garfield High School.

On August 8, 2018, it was reported that Myles Truitt would play Issa Williams during the second season in a recurring capacity. On September 5, Sofia Vassilieva was announced in the role of Looker, based on the DC Comics character of the same name. On September 21, it was reported that Kearran Giovanni would recur as Cutter, a British mercenary. On October 4, it was revealed that Erika Alexander had booked a three-episode recurring role as Jennifer's telepathic therapist, Perenna, though she ultimately appeared in a total of eight episodes. Robert Townsend and Bill Duke were added as recurring characters Dr. Napier Frank and Agent Percy Odell, respectively, on October 9. On November 13, RJ Cyler was cast in the recurring role of "gangly and awkward tech genius" Todd Green. On January 21, 2019, it was announced that Hosea Chanchez had been cast to recur as Marcus Bishop / Shakedown.

On October 10, 2019, it was announced that Wayne Brady would recur during the third season as Tyson Sykes / Gravedigger, a World War II-era "super soldier" and American-turned-Markovian asset. On January 19, 2020, Gupton revealed that he had been let go from the series and that the third season would be his last as a series regular. On November 13, 2020, Chantal Thuy was promoted to a series regular for the fourth season.

=== Design ===
Black Lightning's costume was designed by Laura Jean Shannon. While the suit's design is meant to invoke protection from the character's vulnerabilities such as his age, and bullets in particular, Salim Akil stated that there were "a lot of iterations" of the Black Lightning costume, and that "at one point I had covered his face and his eyes, but what was more important to me was the emotion, and you need to see that. You need to see his eyes when his daughters have a gun pointed at them." A number of journalists noted similarities between the first superhero costume donned by Anissa Pierce, featuring a pink, purple, and blue color scheme with gold and black accents and a blonde wig, and the Thunder costume of the 2003 Outsiders comic book run. Shannon also designed the final Thunder costume, which was made from a sculpted armor material in order to stretch to the performer's comfort and serves as an homage to the most recent costume worn by Thunder in the comic books. The second season introduces the first official superhero costume for Jennifer Pierce as she takes on the moniker "Lightning" from the comic book source material. The costume echoes that of Anissa Pierce, in that it is a black body suit covered in yellow plating. However, the Lightning costume also features lightning-inspired designs. The third season features a new suit design for Jefferson Pierce as Black Lightning. In place of the previous suit's glowing blue and gold bolts across the chest, a textured gold design with blue and black weaving is featured throughout the torso, arms, and gloves. The mask is also slightly redesigned with dark red-tinted lenses. As Anissa Pierce officially takes on the name "Blackbird" as a second secret identity, she also receives a new costume for the alter-ego that consists of a black hood and a mask that covers the lower half of her face.

=== Filming ===
Filming for the series takes place in Decatur, Georgia and the surrounding Atlanta area. The short presentation that was given to The CW was filmed in March 2017, with production for the series officially commencing on September 7, 2017. Filming for the first season concluded on March 3, 2018. Production for the second season returned to Atlanta beginning on June 26, 2018. The back lot used during filming was the same one used by The CW's previous Atlanta-based television series, The Vampire Diaries. Filming for the second season concluded on January 10, 2019. Production for the third season began on July 9, 2019. A week was carved out of the season's production for Williams to film his scenes for the Arrowverse crossover event "Crisis on Infinite Earths" in Vancouver, British Columbia. Filming for the third season concluded on January 20, 2020.

=== Music ===
Kurt Farquhar composes the score for the series and Kier Lehman, the music supervisor for Black Lightning, selects the series' featured songs along with the Akils. The rapper Godholly, who is the son of showrunner Akil, has provided original music for the series, including tracks such as "Black Lightning" from the main title sequence.

== Release ==
=== Broadcast ===
Black Lightning began airing on The CW in the United States on January 16, 2018, during the 2017–18 television season. The first season, consisting of 13 episodes, ran until April 17, 2018. The second season premiered on The CW in the United States on October 9, 2018. In November, it was announced that the series would move to airing on Mondays for the second half of the season after previously airing on Tuesdays since its debut. The 16th and final episode of the second season aired on March 18, 2019. The third season premiered on October 7, 2019. The 16th and final episode of the third season aired on March 9, 2020.

=== Home media ===
Having acquired the international distribution and streaming rights for Black Lightning, Netflix aired new episodes of the first two seasons weekly in regions outside of the United States, including Canada, Australia, New Zealand, the United Kingdom, Ireland, most of mainland Europe, and South America. However, following the expiration of the deal between the streamer and the network, the third season's released date on Netflix internationally was postponed. In the United States, the first season was released on Netflix in its entirety a week after the season finale aired on The CW. The second season was similarly released in its entirety on Netflix in the United States two weeks after the season finale aired on The CW. The third season was released in its entirety on Netflix in the United States on March 17, 2020.

The complete first season of Black Lightning was released on Blu-ray and DVD by Warner Home Entertainment in Region 1 on June 26, 2018, in Region 2 on January 28, 2019, and in Region 4 in 2018. The set also features extra content including the series' 2017 San Diego Comic-Con panel, new featurettes, deleted scenes, and a gag reel. The complete second season was made available as a manufacture-on-demand DVD through the Warner Archive Collection on October 8, 2019.

=== Marketing ===
On March 29, 2017, The CW released the first promotional image of Cress Williams as Jefferson Pierce in his official Black Lightning superhero costume. On May 18, the first trailer for the series was released. The main cast that were confirmed at the time, as well as executive producers Salim Akil and Mara Brock Akil attended the 2017 San Diego Comic-Con on July 22 to promote the season. On December 12, The CW released key art for the series in the form of the season's first promotional poster featuring Williams, China Anne McClain, and Nafessa Williams as their characters. On January 4, 2018, The CW and Warner Bros Television released the first look at Nafessa Williams as Anissa Pierce in her official Thunder superhero costume. On March 25, the producers and writers of the season attended the 2018 WonderCon and screened the episode "Sins of the Father: The Book of Redemption" at their panel ahead of its official debut on The CW. The main cast of the second season as well as the Akils attended San Diego Comic-Con on July 21 to promote the season. The first trailer of the season was released on September 6. On December 13, The CW released the first promotional image of China Anne McClain as Jennifer Pierce in her official Lightning superhero costume. Several of the main cast members of the third season attended San Diego Comic-Con on July 20, 2019, to promote the season. The first trailer of the season was released on September 24.

== Reception ==
=== Ratings ===
Viewership and ratings per season of Black Lightning
Season	Timeslot (ET)	Episodes	First aired		Last aired		TV season	Viewership rank	Avg. viewers (millions)	18–49 rank	Avg. 18–49 rating
Season	Timeslot (ET)	Episodes	Date	Viewers (millions)	Date	Viewers (millions)	TV season	Viewership rank	Avg. viewers (millions)	18–49 rank	Avg. 18–49 rating
1	Tuesday 9:00 pm	13	January 16, 2018	2.31	April 17, 2018	1.69	2017–18	160	2.73	109	1.0
2	Tuesday 9:00 pm (1–9); Monday 9:00 pm (10–16)	16	October 9, 2018	1.20	March 18, 2019	0.85	2018–19	179	1.44	147	0.5
3	Monday 9:00 pm.	16	October 7, 2019	0.89	March 9, 2020	0.55	2019–20	130	1.09	122	0.4
4	Monday 9:00 pm.	13	February 8, 2021	0.52	May 24, 2021	0.50	2020–21	151	0.74	141	0.2

The series premiere of Black Lightning debuted to strong numbers on The CW, according to Nielsen overnight data. Airing in the 9:00pm time slot, Black Lightning's pilot episode drew 2.3 million viewers in the United States and a 0.8 rating in the key demographic of adults 18–49. It retained all of its lead-in in the key demographic and more than 90% in total viewers from The Flash. It was The CW's highest rated original series premiere in two years since the launch of Legends of Tomorrow in 2016. Black Lightning's second season debuted to series lows in viewers 18–49. The second-season premiere drew 1.2 million viewers and a 0.4 rating, down from its first-season premiere, average, and finale, as well as from the premiere of Legends of Tomorrow in the time slot the previous fall. In viewers 18–34, however, Black Lightning improved by 10% from its freshman finale and was even with the debut of Legends of Tomorrow from the previous season. With an 0.3 rating and 0.9 million viewers, the third-season premiere of Black Lightning was down more than 20% across the board from the previous season's finale.

=== Critical response ===
Critical response of Black Lightning
Season	Rotten Tomatoes	Metacritic
1	96% (51 reviews)	79% (25 reviews)
2	91% (10 reviews)	—N/a
3	89% (9 reviews)	—N/a

Black Lightning has received generally positive reviews from professional critics. On the review aggregation website Rotten Tomatoes, the series holds a 95% approval rating. The first season debuted to critical acclaim.

Reviewing for Entertainment Weekly, Dana Schwartz gave the series premiere an "A−" grade, writing, "The Pierce family dynamic is so compelling that even if Jefferson Pierce had no powers beyond great motivational speeches, this show would be a worthwhile watch. Black Lightning balances humor with all-too-necessary social commentary [...] to make a refreshing addition to the superhero TV pantheon." Reviewing the first two episodes of the season, Daniel Fienberg of The Hollywood Reporter commended the series for its "solid action scenes, bass-pumping soundtrack, stylish treatment of Black Lightning's sizzling powers and character pragmatism." He praised the series' ability to "stand alone in welcome ways" and described the premiere episode as "smart and relevant and full of an attitude that's all its own." Reviewing the first four episodes of the series, The Atlantic's Pilot Viruet wrote, "There's an authenticity to the series—it's neither too pulpy nor too preachy—that's heightened by the strong performances from its predominantly Black cast, particularly from [Cress] Williams, who anchors the show's many conflicts." Nafessa Williams' portrayal of Anissa Pierce, Black Lightning's eldest daughter who becomes the superhero Thunder, also drew attention and praise from critics. As the first Black lesbian superhero on television, critics applauded the character's social activism and action scenes, as well as for being a "complex" and "fully realized" character outside of her superhero identity. Reviewing for The A.V. Club, Kyle Fowle gave the finale an "A" grade, writing that the episode was "tonally bold, easily moving between being funny and politically poignant," while also setting up "plenty of intrigue" for next season. Fowle concluded that the episode was a "confident, compelling, moving end to a season that boasted all those same qualities throughout." Jesse Schedeen of IGN noted that the series' reduced episode count, focus on older superheroes and social issues, limited cast, and preservation of the main villain at the end of the season positively distinguished the series from other superhero programming.

The A.V. Club's Fowle gave the second-season premiere an "A−" grade, adding, "One of the reasons the first season was so compelling was that the show made the political personal. That's once again evident here, as there's a wonderful sense of the larger community throughout the premiere." Kayti Burt of Den of Geek! gave the episode a rating of 3.5 stars out of 5. She explained, "There's a lack of thematic cohesiveness in this season premiere that is probably a result of trying to reintroduce so many characters and storylines at once, but the energy and potential for a strong second season is definitely there. Black Lightning continues to be one of the best, most important shows on television." In her review for Collider, Allison Keene gave the season's early storylines 4 stars out of 5, writing, "Black Lightning is not without its own flaws, including occasionally disjointed or abrupt storytelling, but its clear desire to educate and inspire through compelling family drama continues to make it a show of consequence." Burt and Syfy Wire contributor Stephanie Williams praised the season for its efforts to de-stigmatize mental-health care, especially for Black women. Burt called Jennifer's therapy storyline "a powerful, vital representation of mental-health issues—not only within the superhero genre, but anywhere on TV." Again reviewing for The A.V. Club, Fowle gave the season finale a "C+" grade. He named Jennifer's journey as "undoubtedly" the best part of the season, but felt that the second season as a whole "struggled to reach the heights of its first season" and that "storylines were introduced with full force before petering out,[...] stumbling towards lackluster conclusions." Dan Ashby of Cultured Vultures gave the whole season a rating of 7.5 out of 10, writing, "Season two of Black Lightning has some interesting storylines, a number of good fight scenes, a catchy soundtrack, and some important messages. Unfortunately, it all seems slightly uncoordinated and messy in its execution." In a more positive account from Entertainment Weekly, Christian Holub gave the season finale a "B" grade, adding, "Season 2's penultimate installment was all over the place, but tonight's season finale did a good job of bringing enough of the threads together that I'm now satisfied to wait for season 3."

Reviewing the third-season premiere for Entertainment Weekly, Holub gave the episode a "B+" grade, writing, "Black Lightning has been able to do a really good job of showcasing real-life racial dynamics and structural inequities through its comic-flavored storytelling. And in season 3, the show is aiming directly at our real-life crisis of family separation and putting kids in cages. [...] After a bit of a sophomore slump, I'm excited to see where Black Lightning goes from here." Nicole Hill of Den of Geek! assigned the premiere episode a rating of 4 out of 5. She opined that, "Black Lightning does a good job of playing with these different concepts of power and showing how they interact, overlap, and cancel each other out. [...] I hope this season maintains focus and doesn't find itself branching out too far away from its central conflicts. If the following episodes consistently operate at this level, this will be an exciting season to watch." The A.V. Club's Fowle gave the premiere a "B+" grade and added that, "The first episode of the third season is just as politically charged as previous episodes, but this time around, things feel more relevant, more attuned to this specific time and place. Black Lightning has nodded towards real-life events before, but this premiere, centered around kids being rounded up, separated from their families, and locked in detention camps with no idea of when they'll get out or what they did wrong, feels particularly pointed."

=== Analysis ===
Tai Gooden of Syfy Wire wrote, "The usage of religion, specifically Christianity, in Black Lightning strikes a fascinating balance between the science-centered A.S.A. organization and the fantasy element of metahumans whose powers essentially make them gods among men." Gooden pointed out that each episode title contains religious references, particularly the second season's multi-episode chapters named after themes frequently explored in religious texts, such as consequences, blood, and rebellion. Additionally, she highlighted the role of Reverend Holt in the series, whose sermons "are often interspersed with scenes that either complement or counteract a character's current struggle with faith and making the right decisions." She compared Khalil's arc to that of one who has lost their faith, and likened Tobias to a Devil that offers temptations. "The primary characters and community members tackle their personal and collective plights with bold protests, prayers, vigilante justice, and rogue missions, all of which are threaded together through overt and subtle religious references."

Several journalists drew parallels between some of the series's storylines, particularly those involving police brutality and institutional racism, and events that have taken place in real life. Christina Radish of Collider and Charles Pulliam-Moore of io9 felt that the character Issa Williams, a black teen who is held in a fatal chokehold by police as bystanders record the incident and plead for his life, was "reminiscent" of the 2014 death of Eric Garner. Pulliam-Moore also noted that, "The families of Freeland who are fighting to get their children back [from government custody] clearly call to mind all of the undocumented children who've been separated from their families, are being held in detention centers, and may very well never see their loved ones again." Additionally, Entertainment Weekly's Christian Holub compared Anissa's Robin Hood-esque crime-fighting philosophy and alternative costume, a black hoodie and mouth cover, to the philosophies and costumes of Antifa members.

While applauding Jennifer's therapy arc and the series's portrayal of mental health care, Kayti Burt of Den of Geek! cited the scene in the second-season premiere episode in which Jefferson brushes off Lynn's suggestion that he should see a therapist as an example of double standards regarding age and gender. She commented, "The depiction of Jennifer's mental health treatment is so important, but, as a teen girl, Jennifer is allowed a degree of emotional vulnerability that adult men are not." Burt felt that this apparent point of hypocrisy intentionally served as a subject for the story to reflect upon. She said, "Black Lightning isn't ignorant to the many reasons for avoiding shows of emotional vulnerability, of the potential consequences of asking for help in a world that so often equates emotional vulnerability with weakness. It just also chooses to tell the other side of that story: the potential consequences of not acknowledging and actively working on your emotional and mental health issues."

=== Awards and nominations ===
Awards and nominations received by Black Lightning
Year	Award	Category	Recipient(s) and nominee(s)	Result	Ref.
2018	People's Choice Award	Sci-Fi/Fantasy Show of 2018	Black Lightning	Shortlisted	
2018	Saturn Award	Best Superhero Television Series	Black Lightning	Nominated	
2018	Black Reel Award for Television	Outstanding Drama Series	Black Lightning	Won	
2018	Black Reel Award for Television	Outstanding Actor, Drama Series	Cress Williams	Nominated	
2018	Black Reel Award for Television	Outstanding Directing, Drama Series	Salim Akil ("The Resurrection")	Nominated	
2018	Black Reel Award for Television	Outstanding Guest Actress, Drama Series	Jill Scott	Nominated	
2018	Black Reel Award for Television	Outstanding Music	Kier Lehman	Nominated	
2018	Teen Choice Award	Choice Breakout TV Show	Black Lightning	Nominated	
2018	Teen Choice Award	Choice Breakout TV Star	Nafessa Williams	Nominated	
2019	NAACP Image Award	Outstanding Writing in a Drama Series	Patrick Joseph Charles ("Sins of the Father: The Book of Redemption")	Nominated	
2019	NAACP Image Award	Outstanding Guest Performance in a Comedy or Drama Series	Erika Alexander ("The Book of Consequences: Chapter Three: Master Lowery")	Nominated	
2019	GLAAD Award	Outstanding Drama Series	Black Lightning	Nominated	
2019	Black Reel Award for Television	Outstanding Drama Series	Black Lightning	Nominated	
2019	Black Reel Award for Television	Outstanding Directing, Drama Series	Salim Akil ("The Book of the Apocalypse: Chapter Two: The Omega")	Nominated	
2019	Black Reel Award for Television	Outstanding Guest Actress, Drama Series	Erika Alexander	Nominated	
2019	Saturn Award	Best Superhero Television Series	Black Lightning	Nominated	
2021	Critics' Choice Super Awards	Best Actor in a Superhero Series	Cress Williams	Nominated	

== Arrowverse ==
In January 2017, when the series was still in development at Fox, executive producer Greg Berlanti stated that Black Lightning would not crossover with his other DC Comics television properties on The CW, nor would it exist in their shared universe, known as the Arrowverse. Despite Black Lightning's move to The CW, the network's president Mark Pedowitz said in May 2017 that the series "at this time, is not part of the Arrowverse. It is a separate situation." Showrunners Salim Akil later clarified that they were not ruling out eventual crossovers, but wanted to establish the series and its own world first. In August 2017, Pedowitz added, "If [the showrunners] wish to bring it in, that is their call. We had a long discussion with the studio, Mara, Salim, and myself. We were fine with them making it separate from the Arrowverse, they have a different point of view. If they end up wanting to go that way, that will be their decision." Salim Akil explained that the first season's references to the DC Comics characters Vixen and Supergirl, who are also featured in the Arrowverse, were simply a "fun" way "to tease the fans" and stressed that Black Lightning exists on a separate Earth from the Arrowverse series, such as Earth-1 from Arrow, The Flash and Legends of Tomorrow, and Earth-38 from Supergirl. Additionally, he stated that any future crossover would involve the heroes of the other series visiting the Earth that is associated with Black Lightning.

Discussing a potential Black Lightning crossover with the Arrowverse in July 2019, Cress Williams revealed that "there's been lots of talk [...] nothing official, but at this point, I wouldn't be surprised." Two weeks later in August, Williams confirmed reports that Black Lightning would be involved in the Arrowverse's "Crisis on Infinite Earths" crossover event. By the end of the event, the multiverse was rebooted and Earth-Prime was formed, which saw Black Lightning's Earth merged with the former Earth-1 and Earth-38, creating a universe where all of The CW series exist together. Williams reprised his role in the eighth season of The Flash, for the in-season crossover event "Armageddon".

== Cancelled spin-off ==
In November 2020, The CW reportedly began to develop a backdoor pilot for a spin-off of Painkiller with Jordan Calloway reprising his role from Black Lightning. In February 2021, Sibongile Mlambo, Alexander Hodge, and James Roch joined the cast. Later in May, The CW passed the project.
