= Thunder (DC Comics) =

Fictional character published by DC Comics

- Thunder, in a shot from The Other History of the DC Universe #5 (July 2021). Art by Giuseppe Camuncoli, Andrea Cucchi, and José Villarrubia.

Publication information
- Publisher: DC Comics
- First appearance: Outsiders (vol. 3) #1 (August 2003)
- Created by: Judd Winick (writer); Tom Raney (artist)

In-story information
- Full name: Anissa Pierce
- Species: Metahuman
- Team affiliations: Outsiders; Justice League
- Notable aliases: Thunder
- Abilities: Density manipulation; Superhuman strength; Stomp-induced shockwaves; Thunder clap; Energy projection; Shooting lighting; Electrokinesis; Super jump; Electricity Absorption

Thunder (Anissa Pierce) is a fictional character appearing in American comic books published by DC Comics. The character was created by writer Judd Winick and artist Tom Raney in the Modern Age of Comic Books. She is first mentioned in Green Arrow (vol. 2) #26 (July 2003) and first appears a month later in Outsiders (vol. 3) #1. Anissa is a metahuman and the daughter of superhero Black Lightning who can control her density and create shockwaves, but in recent comics she had a major upgrade in her powers, making her a full-fledged electrokinesis user like her dad.

Pierce is also the older sister of Jennifer, herself a superhero operating under the alias Lightning. Against her parents' wishes, Anissa chooses to utilize her abilities to fight crime. She is invited and accepts a position with the superhero team the Outsiders. Pierce is involved in a relationship with teammate Grace Choi.

Along with her presence in various comic books Thunder has made appearances on a number of television shows and appeared in the live action Arrowverse series Black Lightning, portrayed by Nafessa Williams.

== Fictional character biography ==
=== Daughter of Black Lightning ===
Anissa's father Jefferson Pierce (Black Lightning) and her mother Lynn Stewart did not want her following in his footsteps, and he struck a bargain with her: she would graduate from college before considering a career in crimefighting. She did, and the same night of her graduation she donned a costume and became Thunder. She is also the older sister of Lightning.

=== Outsiders ===
Shortly after Thunder had started her solo career, she was approached by Arsenal, who offered her a spot on the new team of Outsiders. Reasoning that she could best learn the superhero trade with a team, she agreed to this offer and became an Outsider. Although she got along with most of her teammates, she seemed to come into conflict with Grace Choi, a tough promiscuous bouncer, constantly. They were however quite effective as a team, and the two slowly came to a grudging respect between them; later on they became lovers.

Eventually her father appeared at the Outsiders headquarters, demanding her resignation from the team. Naturally, she refused and when the danger of Sabbac arose again, her father even decided to accompany the Outsiders. During that adventure, the two came to respect each other's abilities, neither having seen the other in action before, and Thunder was allowed to remain an Outsider.

The extent of her invulnerability was tested during a fight with the re-formed Fearsome Five. Shimmer transmutes the air in Thunder's lungs to water, which nearly kills her. She recovers and continues to serve with the Outsiders.

=== "One Year Later" ===
OYL, Anissa remains a member of the Outsiders (a team that was currently believed to be dead), and has been involved in the attempted toppling of the regime of Mali. Her role has been instrumental in the mission, having gone undercover amongst the government, a role that has required her to pretend she was having a sexual relationship with the country's ruler Ratun Bennin; in actuality, Metamorpho used a hallucinogenic compound to fool the dictator. She compromised the team's mission when she revealed her cover and attacked Mali's army, who were going to slaughter a village.

It was revealed that Thunder has been in a romantic relationship with her teammate Grace, making her one of a handful of LGBT people of color in the DC roster. Thunder was kicked off the Outsiders upon Batman's reorganization of the team, being replaced by the Martian Manhunter. She rejoined the team, when Grace invited her on a mission, without Batman's approval.

During the Batman R.I.P. event, the Outsiders receive a message from the missing Batman, asking them to give ReMAC a secret code that will allow him to track Batman and Black Glove. The Outsiders comply, but the code reveals itself as a trap set by Simon Hurt and causes ReMAC to explode. Several Outsiders are wounded, and Anissa is rendered comatose.

Thunder reappears many months later, having recovered and begun living with Grace. Following a botched mission, Black Lightning arrives at Anissa and Grace's apartment with several other members of the Outsiders, telling Anissa that he wishes to see his children again after spending months without any contact with his family. He briefly expresses discomfort over his daughter's sexual orientation, but Anissa tells him off by stating that Grace was there for her when he was not. When the Justice Society of America attacks the apartment to bring the Outsiders into custody, Anissa chooses to side with her father and fight off the attacking heroes, which ultimately leads to a confrontation with her younger sister, Lightning, whom she claims was always thought of as the "favorite". After the fight is broken up by Doctor Fate, Anissa and Grace rejoin the Outsiders on a mission to Markovia, where Amanda Waller tasked them with capturing Geo-Force.

=== DC All In ===
Anissa initially does reappear following The New 52 reboot. Following DC Rebirth, she was brought back in Black Lightning: Cold Dead Hands in 2017, with her character history largely unchanged. She then appears sporadically in several diversity-themed comics: 2021's Asian Superhero Celebration (alongside Grace), three editions of DC Pride over 2022–2024 (focusing on her relationship with Grace), and DC Power in 2024 (alongside other black DC characters).

During the DC All In era in the Black Lightning series, Anissa's powers expand suddenly, causing her to generate sudden discharges of energy similar to her sister. After Anissa trains with the Justice League, her powers settle into an ability to generate "electrically charged concussive force" along with density control and superhuman strength. She supports her father in opposing the political crusade against metahumans, alongside Grace, Jennifer, and new metahuman recruit to the "House of Lightning" team Isaac Mitchell.

== Powers and abilities ==
Thunder has the ability to increase her body's mass while preserving volume, which effectively increases her density. In this state she is near-immovable, almost completely invulnerable. A mob enforcer once suffered a compound fracture after trying to punch Thunder in the face. Notably, she can make her skin strong enough to withstand bullets. Just by stomping the ground she can create massive shockwaves.

== In other media ==
=== Television ===
- A teenage Thunder appears in the "Thunder and Lightning" segment of DC Nation Shorts, voiced by Cree Summer.
- Anissa Pierce appears in Black Lightning, portrayed by Nafessa Williams. This version's powers are activated by holding her breath. After being kidnapped by the 100 and rescued by her father Black Lightning, Anissa's powers begin to emerge. She later receives a suit from Peter Gambi, joins her father in crime-fighting as Thunder, and goes on to fall in love with and eventually get engaged to marry Grace Choi. Later in the series, Anissa adopts the alias Blackbird to operate as an independent vigilante in response to the A.S.A.'s oppression.
  - Two alternate universe versions of Anissa make cameo appearances in the episode "The Book of Resistance: Chapter Four: Earth Crisis", also portrayed by Williams.
- A young Anissa Pierce appears in Young Justice, voiced by Masasa Moyo.

=== Web series ===
A teenage Thunder appears in DC Super Hero Girls, voiced again by Cree Summer.
