= Technocrat (character) =

- Technocrat as depicted in Infinite Crisis #7 (June 2006). Art by George Pérez.

Publication information
- Publisher: DC Comics
- First appearance: Outsiders (vol. 2) #1 Alpha (November 1993)
- Created by: Mike W. Barr (writer); Paul Pelletier (artist)

In-story information
- Alter ego: Geoffrey Barron
- Team affiliations: Outsiders
- Abilities: Suit of powered armor

Technocrat (Geoffrey Barron) is a superhero in the DC Comics and a former member of the Outsiders. His first appearance was in Outsiders Alpha (vol. 2) #1 (November 1993), written by Mike W. Barr and drawn by Paul Pelletier.

Baron, nicknamed "TC", appears in the Arrowverse series Black Lightning, portrayed by Christopher Ammanuel.

== Fictional character biography ==
Geoffrey Barron, art by Paul Pelletier.

An inventor and business magnate, Geoffrey Barron comes to Markovia to sell his battle armor, the Technocrat 2000. Barron is accompanied by his bodyguard Charlie Wylde.

During their stay in Markovia, the Outsiders are framed for the murder of Queen Ilona. Barron and Wylde flee into the woods, where they encounter Sebastian Faust and a bear. The bear mortally wounds Wylde, forcing Faust to fuse Wylde with the bear to save his life. The Outsiders fight Prince Roderick and his vampire troops.

Barron uses the Technocrat 2000 suit to defend himself and joins the Outsiders alongside Wylde to clear their names. Barron offers the team his home in Switzerland as a safe haven. Unbeknownst to Barron, his ex-wife Marissa has paid the assassin Sanction to assassinate him.

The Outsiders barely make it back to Gotham City before clearing their names. Shortly after their homecoming, Sanction kills Marissa Barron and Halo. The trauma of this death forces the Aurakle, an energy being who is possessing Halo, to inhabit Marissa's body. Barron finds it difficult to separate his feelings for his wife from Halo's physical body. Barron falls in love with the Aurakle, but Halo has her own designs on their teammate, Faust. When the Outsiders split into two teams for a time, Technocrat joins the team with Geo-Force and Katana to distance himself from Halo.

== Powers and abilities ==
Technocrat possesses no superhuman abilities, but is a genius-level cyberneticist and polymath. He uses a high-tech powered exoskeleton of his own design, which is equipped with a variety of weapons and modular upgrades.

== In other media ==
Baron / Technocrat appears in Black Lightning, portrayed by Christopher Ammanuel. This version, also known as "T.C.", is a technopathic metahuman who was previously kept in a stasis pod by the A.S.A. after he was exposed to the drug Green Light years prior. After being freed from his pod, T.C. moves to an old radio station, where he meets and befriends Peter Gambi. After learning the latter provides technical assistance to Black Lightning and his family, T.C. assists them in various missions against the A.S.A., Markovian forces, and Tobias Whale throughout the series before Gambi passes on his duties to T.C.
