= Chantal Thuy =

Canadian actress

- Born: Montreal, Quebec, Canada
- Education: Stella Adler Studio of Acting
- Occupation: Actress
- Height: 170 cm (5 ft 7 in)

Chantal Thuy is a Canadian American actress known for her role as Grace Choi in Black Lightning.

== Early life and education ==
Thuy was born and raised in Montreal, Quebec. Her parents are refugees from Vietnam, having fled the Vietnam War by boat and eventually arriving in Quebec. Her father is a former IBM engineer.

Thuy is a graduate of the Stella Adler Studio of Acting in New York City. She is fluent in English, French, and Vietnamese.

== Career ==
Thuy is known for her portrayal of the DC Comics character Grace Choi on the CW Network show Black Lightning (2018), which ran for four seasons. In October 2020, she was promoted to series regular on the series. Thuy has also appeared on television series like Madam Secretary, Pretty Little Liars and Matador.

In 2018, Thuy optioned Caroline Vu's novel, That Summer in Provincetown, about three generations of Vietnamese Canadians and is currently looking to adapt it into a screenplay.

In 2021, Thuy began portraying detective Lia Kaleo on the CBS action-crime drama series Magnum P.I..

In 2024 she won the Canadian Screen Award for Best Supporting Performance in a Drama Film at the 12th Canadian Screen Awards, for her performance in the film Ru.

=== Theater ===
In February 2019, Thuy co-starred in Tracy Letts' play, Linda Vista, at the Mark Taper Forum in Los Angeles and later reprised her role on Broadway with the Second Stage Theater at the Helen Hayes Theatre.

Her theatre credits also include Pan Asian Repertory Theater's play "We Are", Harold Clurman Lab Theatre's "The Seagull" (Nina) and "Winter's Tale" (Perdita), and reading series with the Ma-Yi Lab Theatre, African American Playwrights Exchange and Teesri Duniya Theatre. She appeared as Marie Louise-Yvette L'Amour in the play "The Lady Was Gentleman" with the Broads' Word Ensemble in Los Angeles.

== Personal life ==
Thuy grew up Catholic but currently practices Buddhism under a Tibetan Buddhist teacher.

In 2024, Thuy announced that she became an American citizen.

== Filmography ==
=== Film ===
Year	Title	Role	Notes
2005	Alex, Vampire Slayer	Witch	Short film
2010	Naked Eye	Anna May Wong	Short
2010	Penny Royal	Kaila	Short film
2012	Pawnbrokers	Mrs. Schofield	Short film
2013	La Bella		Short film
2014	Inherent Vice	Groupie	Uncredited
2014	Halloween Judge	Party guest	Short film
2015	Dog Bowl	Silver Lake Fox	Short film
2015	LA Woman	Samantha DuBois	Short film
2017	Holly	Holly	Short film
2017	Battle for Skyark	Dark seeker	
2017	Promesas	Shi	Short film
2018	Half Magic	Beautiful woman	
2018	Tokyo Ghoul	Rize	Short film (Fan-made film)
2023	Ru		

=== Television ===
Year	Title	Role	Notes
2011	Onion SportsDome	Fake reporter	1 episode
2013	Pretty Little Liars	Jacqueline "Jackie"	Episode: "Now You See Me, Now You Don't"
2014	Matador	Song	Episode: "Dead Dreaming in Bagan"
2014	Fast Food Heights	Kim	Episode: "Study Abroad"
2015	Madam Secretary	Nhung Chuang	Episode: "Whisper of the Ax"
2016	Crossing the Rubicon: Season 1 - The Journey	Kim Wong	Guest role (4 episodes)
2017	High Expectasians	Actress	Episode: "The Audition"
2018–2021	Black Lightning	Grace Choi	Main Role (season 4); Recurring Role (season 1–3); (22 episodes)
2021–2022	Magnum P.I.	Lia Kaleo	Recurring role
2026	The Rookie	Regan	
