= Grace Choi =

- Grace Choi as depicted in The Other History of the DC Universe #5 (September 2021). Art by Giuseppe Camuncoli (pencils), Andrea Cucchi (inks), and Jose Vallarrubia (colors).

Publication information
- Publisher: DC Comics
- First appearance: Outsiders (vol. 3) #1 (August 2003)
- Created by: Judd Winick (writer); Tom Raney (artist)

In-story information
- Species: Bana Amazon
- Team affiliations: Outsiders; Birds of Prey
- Abilities: Superhuman strength, durability, and speed; Regeneration; Enhanced sense of smell

Grace Choi is a fictional character appearing in American comic books published by DC Comics. The character was created by writer Judd Winick and artist Tom Raney, first appearing in Outsiders (vol. 3) #1 (August 2003) in the Modern Age of Comic Books. Grace is introduced as a young Asian American woman using her powers of superhuman strength, healing, and enhanced durability to make a living as a nightclub bouncer, who is reluctantly recruited by her superhero acquaintance Roy Harper to join his new crew of heroes, the Outsiders.

In the course of their adventures, Grace comes to take pride in her work as a vigilante, and discovers that she is descended from a tribe of Amazons, explaining her better-than-human abilities. While working with the Outsiders, she enters into a relationship with her teammate Thunder, the daughter of superhero and Outsider-founding member Black Lightning.

Outside of comics, Choi appears in the Arrowverse television series Black Lightning, portrayed by Chantal Thuy.

== Fictional character biography ==
Grace Choi's history is explored in the "Outsiders: Most Wanted" arc, in which it is revealed that she was previously the victim of a prostitution ring. Upon reaching puberty, Grace used her then-nascent metahuman powers to escape, and spent the next several years living independently, until her recruitment into the Outsiders.

In her first appearance in Outsiders (vol. 3) #1, Grace is working as a bouncer for Chaney's, a nightclub in Metropolis that is primarily frequented by metahumans. Roy Harper recruits Grace into his iteration of the Outsiders, convincing her that being part of the group will pay her three times more than her bouncer job.

=== One Year Later ===
Grace Choi remains a member of the Outsiders, and assists in toppling the regime of Mali. She gets along quite well with the team's newest member, Captain Boomerang, and the two have been involved in the somewhat questionable interrogation of some soldiers, involving torture. It has been revealed that Grace has been secretly involved in a relationship with Thunder (Anissa Pierce). After an unsuccessful mission in North Korea involving Checkmate, Nightwing hands over the Outsiders to Batman, who elects to decide on his own roster culminating in DC Comics' relaunch of the Batman and the Outsiders title.

Grace features in the Amazons Attack! limited series where during an attack on the United States by the Amazons, she encounters the Bana Amazons. One of its members tells her that she is actually part of their tribe, the explanation for earlier allusions by others to "her kind". In the aftermath of the war, Batman assigns Wonder Woman and Grace to a cleanup mission which serves as an audition for his new Outsiders roster. Grace identifies herself as half-Amazonian and displays a deep knowledge of Bana-Mighdall's history. Diana and Grace end their joint mission describing each other as cousins.

Pleased with her performance, Batman welcomes Grace as the final member of his Outsiders. Despite being angry that Thunder "washed out" during Batman's try-outs and has been excluded from the team, she accepts. She then invites Thunder back onto the team without Batman's permission. Following the apparent death of Bruce Wayne, the Outsiders fall into a trap set by Simon Hurt, and most of the team members are severely injured. The group is disbanded shortly thereafter, and is replaced by a new team of Outsiders.

Following her departure from the Outsiders, Grace is shown in a live-in relationship with Anissa, with both being semi-retired. When Black Lightning arrives at Grace and Anissa's apartment with his small band of fugitive heroes, Grace comes to his aid and helps fight off the attacking members of the Justice Society of America (JSA). In the ensuing battle, Grace renders Stargirl and Mister America unconscious, telling them not to threaten her "in-law". After the battle with the JSA, Grace and Thunder agree to join Black Lightning's Outsiders, who are tasked by Amanda Waller with traveling to Markovia and capturing Geo-Force. Following a battle in Markovia, both teams of Outsiders are disbanded by Batman, and the individual heroes return home.

== Powers and abilities ==
Grace Choi possesses metahuman levels of strength, heightened durability and endurance, as well as regeneration and increased healing.

== In other media ==
- Grace Choi appears in Black Lightning, portrayed by Chantal Thuy. This version, also known by her real name Shay Li Wylde, is a metahuman shapeshifter who can turn into a teenager (portrayed by Stella Smith), an old man (Joseph Steven Yang), and a leopard. At a young age, she was kidnapped and forced into prostitution before she was rescued by I.C.E. She subsequently disappeared and resurfaced in Freeland as bartender "Grace Choi", but took schizophrenia medication due to her initially uncontrollable powers. In the present, she meets and befriends Anissa Pierce, but Choi disappears after Anissa sees her eyes changing. Eventually, the pair reunite and rekindle their relationship after Anissa accepts Choi's powers and helps her gain control of them. In time, they would also become engaged, later married, and Choi would adopt the superhero alias "Wylde".
- Grace Choi appears in DC Universe Online.
- Grace Choi appears in Smallville Season 11 as a member of the Outsiders.
