= Cress Williams =

German-born American actor

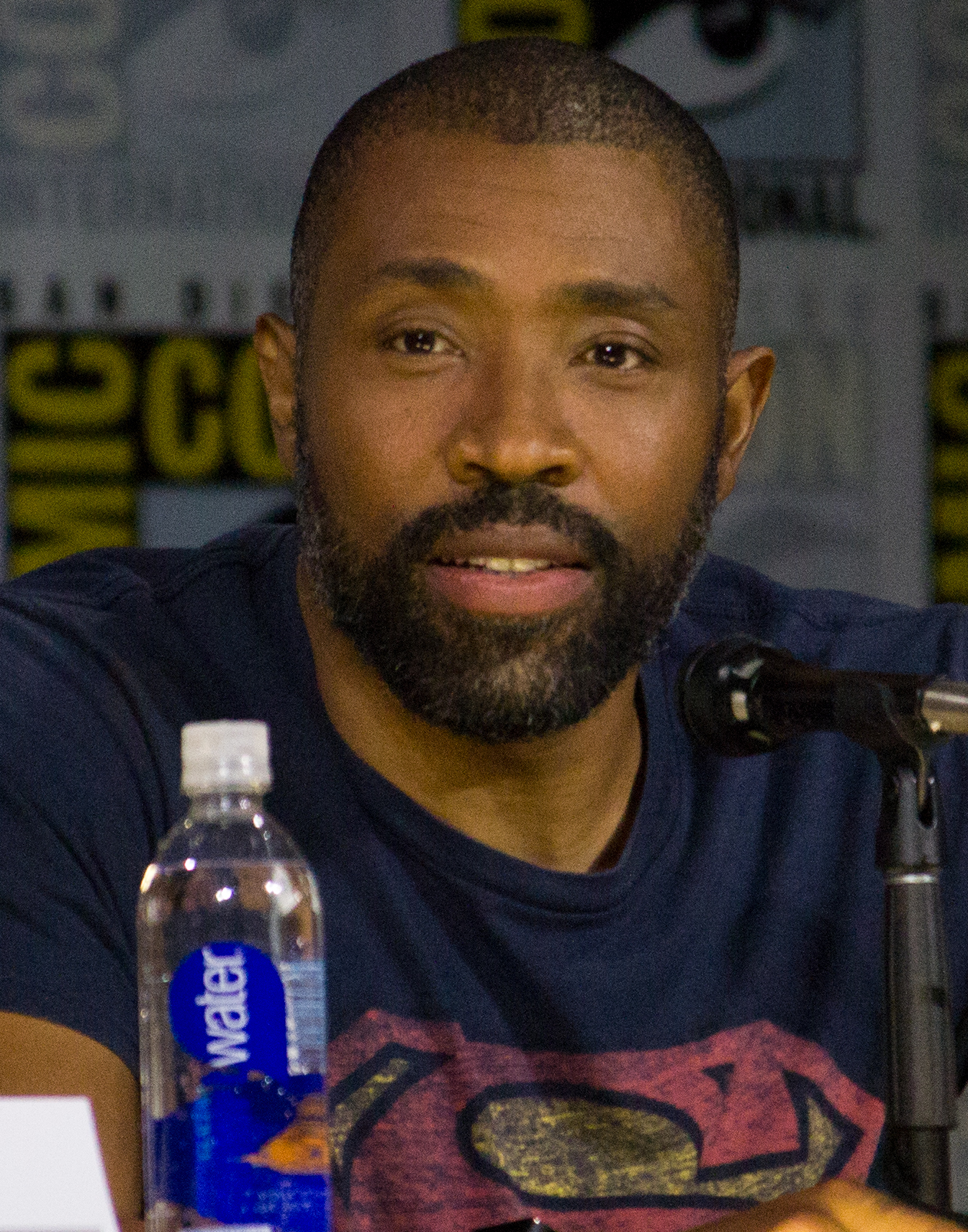
- Williams at San Diego Comic-Con in 2017
- Born: July 26, 1970 (age 56); Heidelberg, Baden-Württemberg, West Germany
- Education: Fullerton College; University of California, Los Angeles (BA)
- Occupation: Actor
- Years active: 1990–present
- Spouses: Simbi Khali (m. 2000; div. 2011) Kristen Torrianni (m. 2013)
- Children: 4

Cress Williams (born July 26, 1970) is an American actor, known for his roles in Prison Break and Close to Home. His most recent roles include Mayor Lavon Hayes on The CW series Hart of Dixie and the title character on The CW's Black Lightning. Williams is also known for his recurring role as Terrence "Scooter" Williams on Fox's Living Single and as Inspector Antwon Babcock on Nash Bridges.

== Early life and education ==
Williams was born in Heidelberg, Baden-Württemberg, West Germany, to American parents. He took courses at Fullerton College and earned a Bachelor of Arts degree in theatre from University of California, Los Angeles.

== Career ==
Williams acted in a 1990 Fullerton College production of William Shakespeare's tragedy, Othello, which was directed by Tom Blank. He also acted in another production in the same year at Fullerton College called Red Noses, a black comedy produced by Peter Barnes and directed by Michael Fields.

Williams has appeared on many TV series since 1994, including Star Trek: Deep Space Nine, Beverly Hills, 90210, NYPD Blue, Lois & Clark: The New Adventures of Superman, JAG, Living Single, Nash Bridges, Providence, Law & Order: Special Victims Unit, Veronica Mars, The West Wing, Close to Home, ER, and Grey's Anatomy. He was the fifth cast member in the original pilot for Will & Grace, playing Will's law firm partner, but was dropped during rehearsals because director Jim Burrows said they didn't need his character. He portrayed Talak'talan, a Jem'Hadar leader in the Star Trek series, in a Star Trek: Deep Space Nine episode "The Jem'Hadar". Williams joined the Prison Break cast by playing The Company's assassin, Wyatt Mathewson. He appeared in the final season of Friday Night Lights as Ornette Howard, father of East Dillon's star quarterback Vince Howard. He also starred alongside Rachel Bilson on The CW series Hart of Dixie as former football star turned mayor Lavon Hayes.

From 2018 to 2021, he has ventured back into adaptations of DC Comics: As main character Jefferson Pierce / Black Lightning on The CW's superhero TV series Black Lightning, which was integrated into Arrowverse's prime Earth during Crisis on Infinite Earths, and as John Henry Irons in the animated film The Death of Superman and its 2019 sequel, Reign of the Supermen. After his Black Lightning series concluded, he reprised the role on The Flash at the start of its eighth season as part of its "Armageddon" event.

== Personal life ==
On October 14, 2000, Williams married actress Simbi Khali in Malibu, California. The couple had two children and divorced in 2011. Williams married girlfriend Kristen Torrianni in June 2013. Williams and Torrianni also have two children together.

== Filmography ==
=== Film and TV movies ===
Year	Title	Role	Notes
1995	The Doom Generation	Peanut	
1996	2 Days in the Valley	Golfer	
1996	Rolling Thunder	'Grey' Toussaint	TV movie
1996	Rebound: The Legend of Earl "The Goat" Manigault	Kimbrough	TV movie
1997	Home Invasion	Freemont	TV movie
1997	L.A. Johns	Bill Allen	TV movie
1997	Pants on Fire	Dream Guy	Short
1998	Fallen	Detective Joe	
1999	Never Been Kissed	George	
1999	The Dogwalker	K.C.	
2000	Masquerade	Marcus	TV movie
2001	Pursuit of Happiness	Ace	
2002	Couples	Marcus	TV movie
2004	Little Black Book	Phil	
2006	Haskett's Chance	Hudson Chanticleer	
2008	Ball Don't Lie	Dante	
2014	In Your Eyes	Jake	
2016	Lowriders	Detective Williams	
2018	The Death of Superman	John Henry Irons (voice)	Video
2019	Reign of the Supermen	John Henry Irons (voice)	Video
2020	The Violent Heart	Lee	
2021	Crime Story	Billy	
2022	What Remains	Marshall	

=== Television ===
Year	Title	Role	Notes
1993–98	Living Single	Terrence 'Scooter' Williams	Recurring cast
1993–94	Beverly Hills, 90210	D'Shawn Hardell	Recurring cast: season 4–5
1994	Star Trek: Deep Space Nine	Talak'talan	Episode: "The Jem'Hadar"
1994	Hardball	'Spotlight' Davis	Episode: "See Spot Rum"
1995	The Watcher	-	Episode: "Resurrection/Niles and Bob/Harry Stenz"
1995	If Not for You	Ahmed	Episode: "Snap!"
1995	NYPD Blue	Silky	Episode: "A Murder with Teeth in It" & "One Big Happy Family"
1996	Lois & Clark: The New Adventures of Superman	Baron Sunday/John Hendrix	Episode: "Never on Sunday"
1996	JAG	Captain Overton	Episode: "The Brotherhood"
1997	Leaving L.A.	Dudley Adams	Recurring cast
1998	Creature	Tall Man	TV mini series
1998	Buddy Faro	Jaleel Jermaine	Episode: "Ain't That a Kick in the Head"
1998–2008	ER	Officer Reggie Moore	Supporting cast: Season 5-6, guest: Season 14
1999	Becker	Chris Davis	Episode: "Blind Curve"
2000	Sports Night	Steve Sarris	Episode: "Dana Get Your Gun"
2000	G vs E	Virgil Grissom	Episode: "Underworld"
2000–01	Nash Bridges	Inspector Antwon Babcock	Main cast: season 6
2001	Philly	Calvin Burney	Episode: "Loving Sons"
2001–02	Providence	Dr. Sam Magala	Recurring cast: season 4
2002	Presidio Med	Richard Clayton	Episode: "This Baby's Gonna Fly"
2002	The District	Dr. Carson	Episode: "Drug Money"
2003	Touched by an Angel	Riley	Episode: "And a Nightingale Sang"
2003	Watching Ellie	Dexter	Episode: "Buskers"
2003	The Lyon's Den	Eddie	Episode: "Beach House"
2004	Law & Order: Special Victims Unit	Sam Dufoy	Episode: "Careless"
2004	House	Hospital Attorney	Episode: "Maternity"
2005–06	Veronica Mars	Nathan Woods	Recurring cast: season 2
2005–06	The West Wing	Lester	Episode: "Undecideds" & "Election Day: Part 1"
2006–07	Close to Home	Detective Ed Williams	Main cast: season 2
2006–08	Grey's Anatomy	Tucker Jones	Recurring cast: Season 2, 4
2008	Prison Break	Wyatt Matthewson	Recurring cast: Season 4
2009	Cold Case	Jimmy Clarke	Episode: "Jurisprudence"
2010–11	Friday Night Lights	Ornette Howard	Recurring cast: Season 5
2011	Hawthorne	Tony Gee	Episode: "Price of Admission" & "A Shot in the Dark"
2011–15	Hart of Dixie	Lavon Hayes	Main cast
2015	State of Affairs	Dale Scott	Recurring cast
2015–17	Code Black	Cole Guthrie	Recurring cast: season 1–2
2017	Doubt	A.D.A. Gates	Episode: "To See, To Tell"
2018–21	Black Lightning	Jefferson Pierce / Black Lightning	Main cast
2019–21	The Flash	Jefferson Pierce / Black Lightning	3 episodes
2020	Legends of Tomorrow	Jefferson Pierce / Black Lightning	Episode: "Crisis on Infinite Earths, Part Five"
2025	Eyes of Wakanda	Nkati / The Lion (voice)	Disney+ series; episode: "Into the Lion's Den"
