= Jordan Calloway =

American actor

Jordan Calloway is an American actor. He is known for his role as Zach Carter-Schwartz on the Nickelodeon series Unfabulous (2004–2007). Calloway has also had recurring roles on NBC's ER (2005–2006), as well as The CW series Riverdale (2017–2018), and Black Lightning (2018–2021). Since 2022, he has starred as Jake in the CBS action drama, Fire Country.

== Early life and education ==
He is the son of cinematographer Joseph Calloway. Calloway's parents are divorced. He is the youngest of several children. As a child, Calloway had aspirations of becoming a Navy SEAL, while his brother was actually interested in acting. Calloway attended Maranatha High School and graduated in 2009. He played varsity baseball for all four years. He would later attend Azusa Pacific University. He graduated with a degree in TV and film production.

== Filmography ==
=== Film ===
| Year | Title | Role | Notes |
|---|---|---|---|
| 2012 | Jeffrey's Fortune | N/A | Short film; producer |
| 2013 | Life of a King | Marcus | |
| 2016 | Grandma's House | Izak | |
| 2019 | Legacy | Grayson | |
| 2019 | Countdown | Matt Monroe | |
| 2019 | Always a Bridesmaid | Mark | |

=== Television ===
| Year | Title | Role | Notes |
|---|---|---|---|
| 2000 | The Parkers | Jerel Jr. | Episode: "Wedding Bell Blues" |
| 2001 | The District | Son | Episode: "The D.C. Strangler" |
| 2002 | George Lopez | Kid #2 | Episode: "Max's Big Adventure" |
| 2004 | Adventures in Odyssey | Marvin Washington (voice) | 5 episodes |
| 2004–2007 | Unfabulous | Zach Carter-Schwartz | Main role |
| 2005–2006 | ER | K.J. Thibeaux | Recurring role (seasons 11–12), 7 episodes |
| 2010 | The Glades | De'Andre Matthews | Episode: "Mucked Up" |
| 2011 | DisCONNECTED | Isaiah | Television film |
| 2014 | Switched at Birth | Aaron Legrange | Episode: "Your Body Is a Battleground" |
| 2014 | Gang Related | Darnell Grecco | Episode: "Pecados del Padre" |
| 2014 | Reckless | Maddox Tate | Episode: "Blind Sides" |
| 2014 | Drumline: A New Beat | Jayven LaPierre | Television film |
| 2015 | Studio City | Griffin | Television film |
| 2016 | Ghost | Oliver | Television film |
| 2016 | Recovery Road | N/A | Episode: "My Loose Thread" |
| 2016 | House of Lies | Ryder | Episode: "Tragedy of the Commons" |
| 2016–2017 | Beyond | Kevin McArdle | Main role (pilot); recurring role (season 1); 4 episodes |
| 2017 | Pure Genius | Henry Jones | Episode: "Lift Me Up" |
| 2017 | Freakish | Zane | Recurring role (season 2), 9 episodes |
| 2017–2018 | Riverdale | Chuck Clayton | Recurring role (seasons 1–2), 6 episodes |
| 2018 | The Mick | Marcus/Tre | Episode: "The Car" |
| 2018–2021 | Black Lightning | Khalil Payne/Painkiller | Recurring role (season 1); main role (season 2–4) |
| 2019 | The Fix | Samuel Johnson | Episode: "Pilot" |
| 2022 | Tales | Aiden | Episode: "Survival of the Fittest" |
| 2022–present | Fire Country | Jake Crawford | Main role |

== Awards and nominations ==
| Year | Award | Category | Work | Result | Ref. |
|---|---|---|---|---|---|
| 2005 | Young Artist Awards | Outstanding Young Performers in a TV Series | Unfabulous | Nominated | |
| 2006 | Young Artist Awards | Best Young Ensemble Performance in a TV Series (Comedy or Drama) | Unfabulous | Nominated | |
| 2007 | Young Artist Awards | Best Young Ensemble Performance in a TV Series (Comedy or Drama) | Unfabulous | Nominated | |
