= Nafessa Williams =

American actress

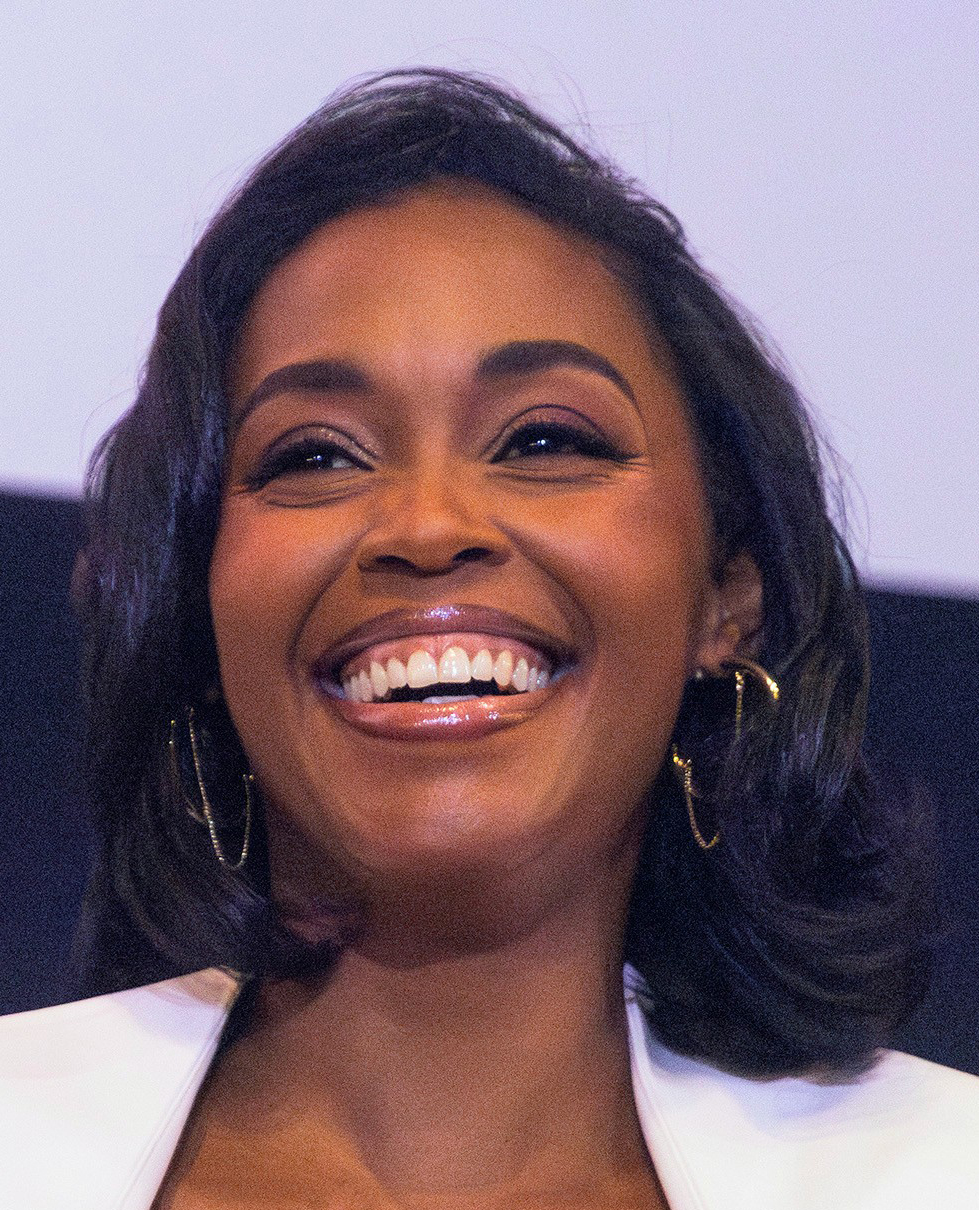
- Williams in 2026
- Born: 1985 (age 40–41); Philadelphia, Pennsylvania, U.S.
- Education: West Chester University
- Occupation: Actress
- Years active: 2011–present
- Known for: Black Lightning

Nafessa Williams (born 1985) is an American actress. She is best known for portraying Anissa Pierce in The CW's Black Lightning and Robyn Crawford in the 2022 Whitney Houston biopic Whitney Houston: I Wanna Dance with Somebody.

== Early life and education ==
Williams was born and raised in West Philadelphia. She attended Robert E. Lamberton High School. Growing up in inner-city Philadelphia, Williams was exposed to violence, drugs, and police brutality. After seeing Phylicia Rashad's lawyer character Clair Huxtable on the sitcom The Cosby Show, Williams was inspired to attend law school to counter the violence she saw growing up.

Williams studied criminal justice at West Chester University and interned in the homicide unit of the Philadelphia District Attorney's Office. Early into her law career, Williams debated changing career paths, after being unhappy in her work, and began taking acting classes. She took on modeling and small television jobs while still working at the Martin Banks law firm. In 2008, she was fired for calling out to attend an audition. Williams credits this as the moment she fully decided to turn to acting full time, calling it "best thing that happened to [her]."

== Career ==
She began her acting career with local work in Philadelphia, with her first break being a Foreman Mills commercial. She moved to New York, following being fired from the firm. While living there she studied at the Susan Batson studios and trained with Tasha Smith.

In 2010, Williams gained her first film role, being cast opposite Philadelphia rapper Meek Mill in Streets. She credits native Philadelphia music industry insider Charlie Mack for his help getting the role and mentoring her. The film was released in 2011.

In March 2011, it was announced that Williams would join the cast of ABC's One Life to Live in the contract role of Deanna. When Williams auditioned, the character was only supposed to appear in three episodes, however by the time of her debut, she had signed a four-year contract. Only a month into her stint, it was announced that ABC had decided to cancel the series. Williams was released from her contract early and last appeared in July 2011. Following the show's cancellation, she moved to Los Angeles for more opportunities.

In March 2012, Williams announced that she would be guest starring on the CBS soap opera The Bold and the Beautiful. Williams made her debut on May 8, 2012, appearing in two episodes.

In 2015, Williams appeared in the Queen Latifah executive produced feature film, Brotherly Love, opposite Keke Palmer. The same year, she had a supporting role in Angela Bassett's Whitney Houston biopic Lifetime film, Whitney.

In April 2016, Williams was cast as Jade in the Showtime continuation of the 1990s ABC drama Twin Peaks. Later that year, she was cast in the recurring role of Charlotte on the CBS prime time drama, Code Black.

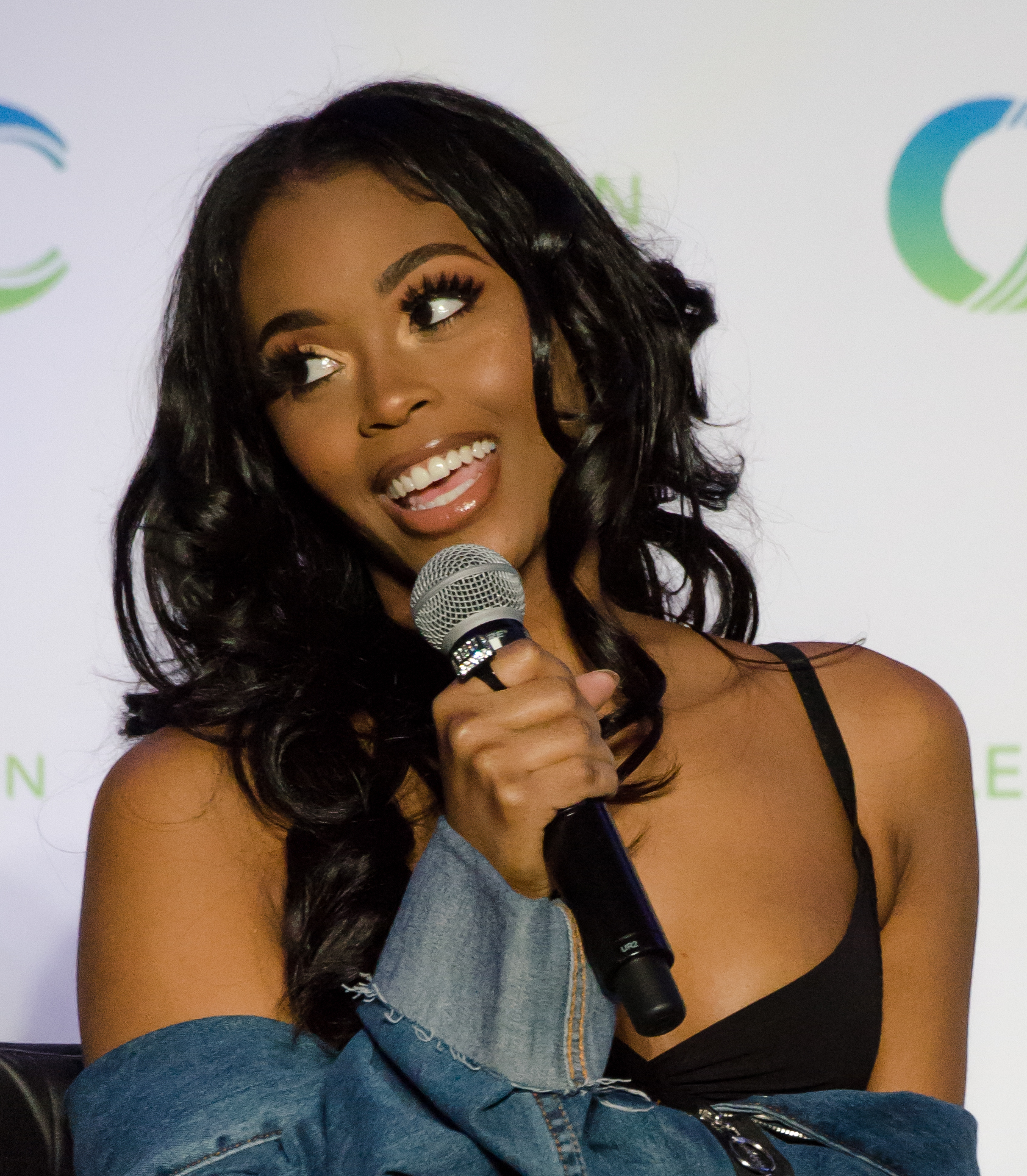
Williams in 2018

In 2017, Williams was cast as Anissa Pierce in the 2018 Mara Brock Akil/Greg Berlanti series Black Lightning. The character became the first black lesbian superhero to be portrayed to be on network television, while also being a part of the first black superhero family to lead a major television show. Williams told Nylon magazine, "I knew [Anissa] would be an inspiration. To not just young black girls, but young black girls who are lesbians and all the lesbians who just want to feel represented in Marvel films... The experiences and some of the circumstances and situations you see within the show, they happen in any inner city—the shooting, the violence, the brutality, the drugs, the police brutality. Social injustice." She continued in the role until the series finale in 2021.

In May and June 2019, Williams, DC Comics Co-Publisher Jim Lee, writer Tom King, and fellow CW series actresses Candice Patton and Danielle Panabaker toured five U.S. military bases in Kuwait with the United Service Organizations (USO), where they visited the approximately 12,000 U.S. military personnel stationed in that country as part of DC's 80th anniversary of Batman celebration.

In February 2021, Williams launched her own unisex apparel brand Y-FEAR ('Your Fear and Egos Aren't Real!'). The brand was inspired by her love for fashion and personal wellness growth, wanting to bridge the two together Collections from the brand focus on trendy loungeware and athleisure.

In 2022, she starred in Sony's Whitney Houston biopic I Wanna Dance With Somebody. Williams portrayed American author and producer Robyn Crawford, whom was also an assistant, creative director, and former romance of Houston. To prepare for the role, Williams used Crawford's 2019 memoir A Song for You: My Life with Whitney Houston. The same year, 26 Magazine named Williams their Woman of the Year.

In 2024, Williams had a lead role in the Disney+ Hulu television adaption of Jilly Cooper's Rutshire Chronicles. She portrayed Cameron Cook, an American television producer in 1980s upper class England. She starred alongside David Tennant, Aidan Turner, Victoria Smurfit, Alex Hassell, Bella Maclean, Katherine Parkinson, and Danny Dyer. The show was renewed for a second season in December, with Williams set to return.

== Personal life ==
Williams' inspirations include Phylicia Rashad, Tichina Arnold, and Tisha Campbell.

She has been outspoken on issues of racism and police bruality. In July 2020, Williams penned an open letter to Hollywood, asking for them to "confront the issues of inequality head on."

"We need more Black writers to tell Black stories. We need Black hairstylists who know how to do Black hair properly. And award shows can only be fairly judged if done by a diverse group. We as a people and as a culture are beyond tired of asking to be seen, heard and treated equally. Not just in the entertainment industry, but in all industries. I believe we must continue to have these important conversations and create the necessary changes."

== Filmography ==
=== Film ===
Year	Title	Role	Notes
2011	Streets	Nicole Gordon	
2013	Dumb Girls	Female Co-Ed #1	TV movie
2014	The Dirty 30	Samantha Kimm	
2015	Whitney	Kim	TV movie
2015	Brotherly Love	Simone	
2015	The Man in 3B	Krystal	
2016	Restored Me	Monica Berry	
2016	Asterisk	Angela	Short
2017	Burning Sands	Toya	
2017	True to the Game	Sahirah	
2019	Black and Blue	Missy	
2021	A Holiday Chance	Noel Chance	
2022	Whitney Houston: I Wanna Dance with Somebody	Robyn Crawford	

=== Television ===
Year	Title	Role	Notes
2011	One Life to Live	Deanna Forbes	Regular Cast
2012	The Bold and the Beautiful	Margo Ivey	Episode: "Episode #1.6316" & "#1.6323"
2014	Survivor's Remorse	Adina Parker	Episode: "Six"
2015	Real Husbands of Hollywood	Eboni	Episode: "Hart Medication"
2016	Code Black	Dr. Charlotte Piel	Recurring cast: season 2
2017	Twin Peaks	Jade	Recurring cast: season 3
2017	Tales	Jenny	Episode: "F*ck the Police"
2018–21	Black Lightning	Anissa Pierce/Thunder	Main cast
2024	Rivals	Cameron Cook	Main cast

=== Video games ===
Year	Title	Role	Notes
2016	NBA 2K17	Tiffany Raspberry (voice)	

== Awards and nominations ==
Year	Award	Category	Nominated work	Result	Ref.
2018	Teen Choice Awards	Choice TV: Breakout Star	Black Lightning	Nominated	
