= Salim Akil =

Film director, producer and screenwriter

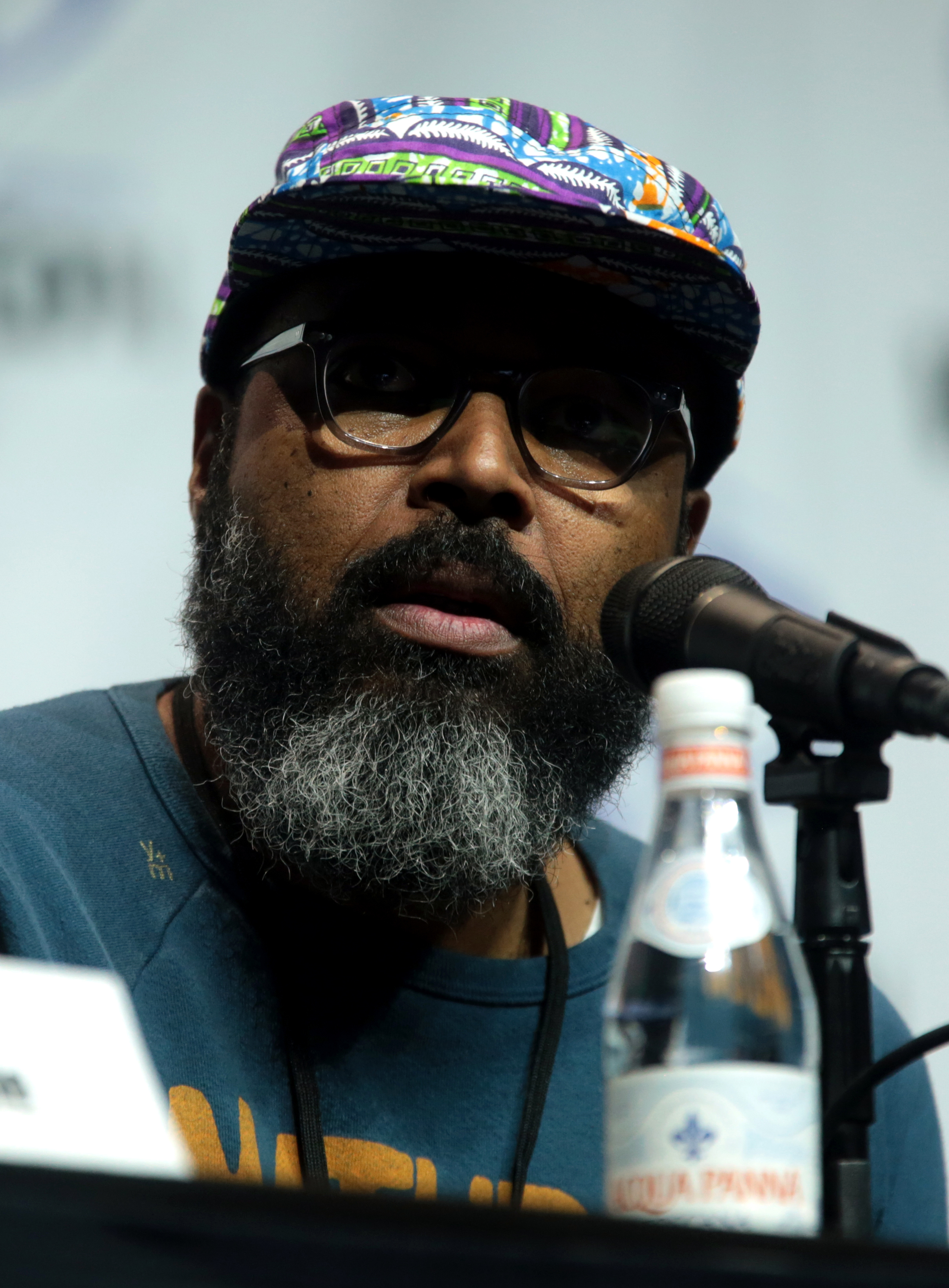
- Akil at the 2018 WonderCon.
- Born: Oakland, California, U.S.
- Occupations: Screenwriter, producer
- Years active: 1999–present
- Spouse: Mara Brock Akil (m. 1999)
- Children: 4

Salim Akil is an American film and television producer, director, and screenwriter from Oakland, California. He developed the television series Black Lightning based on a DC comics character of the same name. He is a co-founder of Akil Productions which he founded with his wife Mara Brock Akil.

== Early life and education ==
Akil was born in Oakland, California. He attended Columbia College Hollywood in Los Angeles, California.

== Career ==
Akil began his production career in 1999, working on the film Drylongso, which played at the Sundance Film Festival later that year. In 2000, he worked as a staff writer and executive producer on the Showtime series Soul Food. That same year, he founded Akil Productions, then known as Happy Camper Productions, with his wife Mara Brock Akil. Mara later created the show Girlfriends, which premiered in 2000 on UPN, with Salim directing several episodes. The show's spin-off The Game premiered in 2006 on The CW, with Salim serving as an executive producer. In 2011, he directed the film Jumping the Broom, which was nominated for a BET Award for Best Movie; he also won an NAACP Image Award for Outstanding Director in a Motion Picture for the film that same year. In 2012, he directed and co-produced a remake of the film Sparkle. Akil executive produced the BET series Being Mary Jane, created by Mara, which premiered in 2014. In 2016, he received an NAACP Image Award nomination for Outstanding Directing in a Drama Series for the show's episode "Sparrow", as well as a nomination for Outstanding Directing in a Motion Picture (Television) for The Start Up. He later began developing the show Black Lightning, which premiered in 2018 on The CW. He has written and directed several episodes of the series since its premiere. In February 2021, Akil confirmed a spin-off of Black Lightning titled Painkiller was in production.

== Personal life ==
Akil married Mara Brock in 1999. The two met while working on the set of Moesha. They have two sons. He and his wife, Mara, are practicing Sufi Muslims. The Akils created Love is ___, which was based on their relationship, but was canceled after a woman accused Salim of domestic violence in an alleged extramarital affair, as well as copyright infringement by using her screenplay as the basis for the series. A statement made by Akil's lawyers denied all allegations.

== Awards and nominations ==
| Year | Award | Result | Category | Work |
|---|---|---|---|---|
| 2012 | NAACP Image Awards | Won | Outstanding Writing in a Comedy Series (shared with Mara Brock Akil) | The Game (For episode "Parachutes...Beach Chairs") |
| 2012 | NAACP Image Awards | Nominated | Outstanding Directing in a Comedy Series | The Game (For episode "Parachutes...Beach Chairs") |
| 2012 | NAACP Image Awards | Won | Outstanding Director in a Motion Picture (Theatrical or Television) | Jumping the Broom |
| 2016 | NAACP Image Awards | Nominated | Outstanding Directing in a Drama Series | Being Mary Jane (For episode "Sparrow") |
| 2016 | NAACP Image Awards | Nominated | Outstanding Directing in a Motion Picture (Television) | The Start Up |
| 2018 | Black Reel Awards | Won | Outstanding Drama Series (Shared with Mara Brock Akil, Greg Berlanti and other producers) | Black Lightning |
