= Jefferson Pierce (Arrowverse) =

Fictional character in the Arrowverse

- Arrowverse character
- Cress Williams as Jefferson Pierce / Black Lightning
- First appearance: "The Resurrection"; Black Lightning; January 16, 2018
- Last appearance: "Armageddon, Part 3"; The Flash; November 30, 2021
- Based on: Black Lightning by: Jenny Blake Isabella; Trevor Von Eeden
- Adapted by: Salim Akil
- Portrayed by: Cress Williams (adult); Kaden Washington Lewis (young)

In-universe information
- Aliases: Black Lightning; Black Jesus
- Nickname: Jeff
- Species: Metahuman
- Occupation: Member of the Crisis Team; Vigilante (in secret); Principal of Garfield High School; Leader of Team Black Lightning
- Affiliation: Garfield High School; Justice League
- Family: Alvin Pierce (father, deceased); Ben Pierce (grandfather); Lynn Stewart (wife); Anissa Pierce (older daughter); Jennifer Pierce (younger daughter)

Jefferson Michael "Jeff" Pierce, also known by his alter ego Black Lightning, is a fictional character in The CW's Arrowverse franchise, first introduced in the 2018 episode "The Resurrection" of the television series Black Lightning. The character is based on the DC Comics character of the same name, created by Jenny Blake Isabella and Trevor Von Eeden, and was adapted for television in 2018 by Salim Akil. Jefferson Pierce has been continually portrayed by Cress Williams, with Kaden Washington Lewis portraying a young Jefferson.

In the series, Jefferson, is the principal of the Garfield High School, and a retired vigilante, who lives in Freeland. His powers are many, with electrokinesis, energy absorption and superhuman strength being a few. During the first season he has to return to his superhero life, and help his daughter, Anissa handle her powers, while also stopping his nemesis, Tobias Whale. In the following seasons he has to deal with new threats, like A.S.A. and Markovia. He is a friend of fellow superhero, Central City-based superhero The Flash, who is also the leader of the Justice League.

Williams has appeared as Jefferson Pierce and his vigilante persona in two crossovers of the Arrowverse, the "Crisis on Infinite Earths" and "Armageddon".

== Fictional character biography ==
=== Early life ===
Jefferson Michael Pierce was born on September 12, 1974, to Alvin Pierce and an unnamed mother. At one point Jefferson was given a vaccine by his father, which Alvin later found out was tainted, this would eventually be how Jefferson would get his powers. Alvin was a reporter who was after Tobias Whale. One night, Jefferson watched as Tobias murdered his father. When Jefferson was twelve, he took part in a riot, which he was chased down an alley by two SWAT officers and accidentally set off his powers for the first time, knocking out both of the officers. He was then found in the alley by Peter Gambi, who discovered Jefferson's powers and then began raising Jefferson.

=== Stopping Martin Proctor's plans ===
Jefferson is living in Freeland and works as Principal of the Garfield High School. He has retired from superhero life years ago, and is divorced with Lynn Stewart, and also has two daughters, Anissa and Jennifer. When he lears that Anissa is in danger, he saves her using his powers in the process for the first time in a long time. After some consideration, and some conversations with his friend Peter Gambi, he decides to take up the mantle of Black Lightning again, acting as a superhero during the night and principal and parent during the day. Jefferson learns about the existence of a new drug, called "green light", that is distributed by a criminal group called "The 100", headed by Tobias Whale. After The 100 killed two civilians, the local community march on the streets of Freeland, without police protection as requested. The 100 attacked the marching, but with only one casualty, as Jefferson was there and protected them. Following a fight with Anissa, who has superpowers like her father and is acting as a vigilante, he injures her and calls Gambi to take care of her, and she learns that Jefferson is the Black Lightning. Jefferson began training Anissa, to learn to control her powers. She eventually adapts the alias of "Thunder", and works on operations with her father. His younger daughter, Jennifer, learns that he is Black Lightning, and that she also has superpowers. Jefferson later learns that a government organization called the A.S.A. is behind the creation of green light drug, and wants to use it to create metahumans. It is headed by Martin Proctor, who is acting independently. Eventually Gambi kills him and Black Lightning exposes A.S.A. operations in Freeland.

=== Helping to stop the Crisis ===
After The Flash, Nash Wells, Frost, Earth-90 Flash and Vibe fail to stop the Anti-Monitor's weapon, Nash brings Jefferson to Earth-1 to help contain the energy of the anti-matter weapon. He does so, but Earth-90 Flash sacrifices himself and saves the universe from total destruction. Nash teleported them back to the Waverider, where Jefferson meets Clark Kent / Superman and the other superheroes. Unfortunately, the Anti-Monitor appears and destroys the rest of the universe, killing Jefferson too.

After Oliver Queen / Spectre sacrifices himself to restart the Multiverse and merge other Earths including Jefferson's, he saves Frost and Mick Rory from a shadow demon. Afterwards, he joins Kara Danvers / Supergirl, Sara Lance / White Canary, Clark Kent / Superman, J'onn J'onzz / Martian Manhunter, Barry Allen / The Flash and Kate Kane / Batwoman to form the Justice League. Following their meeting, he returns to Freeland.

=== Defeating Tobias Whale once and for all ===
Following the dissolution of the A.S.A. and the War for Freeland, Jefferson began to mourn Henderson's death during the conflict. After doing so he decides to put an end on the ambitions of Tobias Whale, now Mayor of Freeland. He eventually fights him and kills him. He finally decides to go back to retirement from the superhero life.

=== Helping Barry Allen ===
In compliance with the Injustice Protocols, Barry Allen asks Jefferson to permanently remove his powers. He begins to, but stops when Barry mentions Despero. Barry angrily lashes out at Jefferson, but is eventually convinced to stand down. Despero learns where Barry is and travels there, but is held off by Jefferson.

== Alternate versions ==
- In the third-season episode "The Book of Resistance: Chapter Four: Earth Crisis", a version of Jefferson who became the Secretary of Education appears, from Earth-1, who is shot and killed by Agent Percy Odell.
- In the same episode, an alternate universe variant of Jefferson from Earth-2 appears. Jennifer kills him and the rest of her family.

== Appearances ==
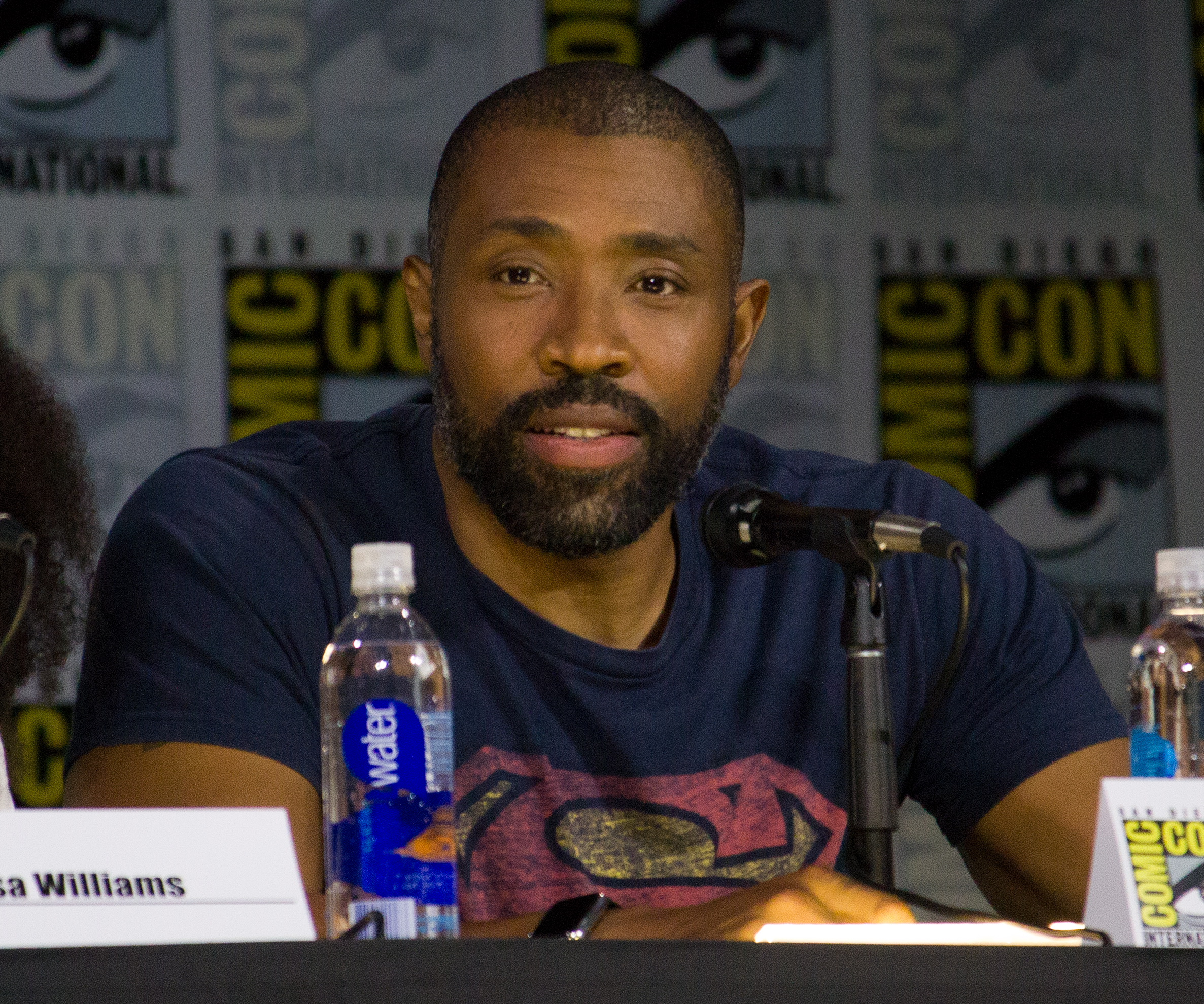
Williams at San Diego Comic-Con in 2017

Cress Williams has portrayed Black Lightning in three out of seven Arrowverse TV series, with these being:

- Black Lightning, as the protagonist and lead character.
- The Flash, as a guest in season 6 and season 8.
- Legends of Tomorrow, as a guest in season 5.
- He is mentioned in the Supergirl episode "Blind Spots".

== Characterization ==
Akil described Jefferson and his family as "the Obamas of the superhero world" and compared the duality of Jefferson Pierce and his alter ego Black Lightning to the duality of Martin Luther King Jr. and Malcolm X. Williams said that "it was a dream come true" when he was cast as Black Lightning and it was hard, at first, portraying him, but loved it in the process. Williams also stated that "I always saw a parallel between Black Lightning and Batman [...] Before Batman becomes part of the Justice League, he's essentially the savior of Gotham. I think that's what Black Lightning is about." When asked if it was stressful to portray the character he said "It's not so much pressure as it is an honor.", while also saying that "The physical part of it [was the biggest challenge in taking on this role]".

== Reception ==
On February 24, 2017, Cress Williams was announced in the lead role of Jefferson Pierce / Black Lightning. One user of Metacritic wrote "Jefferson Pierce isn't just a superhero. He's a social justice warrior. He quotes Martin Luther King Jr. and beats up bad guys. This instantly makes him one of the most interesting heroes on television." Reviewing for Entertainment Weekly, Dana Schwartz gave the series premiere an "A−" grade, writing, "The Pierce family dynamic is so compelling that even if Jefferson Pierce had no powers beyond great motivational speeches, this show would be a worthwhile watch. The Atlantic's Pilot Viruet wrote, "There's an authenticity to the series—it's neither too pulpy nor too preachy—that's heightened by the strong performances from its predominantly Black cast, particularly from [Cress] Williams, who anchors the show's many conflicts." The success of Williams version resulted in placing the character at the 73rd place of the list of the 100 greatest superheroes In the history of comic books. Williams has received positive reviews by both fans and critics.
