= Skin graft (disambiguation) =

Skin graft may refer to:

- Skin grafting, a medical procedure
- Skin Graft Records, a record company
- Skin Graft: The Adventures of a Tattooed Man, a 1993 Vertigo comic book limited series
