= Black Lightning season 3 =

Black Lightning
- Season 3
- Promotional poster
- Starring: Cress Williams; China Anne McClain; Nafessa Williams; Christine Adams; Marvin "Krondon" Jones III; Damon Gupton; Jordan Calloway; James Remar
- No. of episodes: 16

Release
- Original network: The CW
- Original release: October 7, 2019 – March 9, 2020

Season chronology
- ← Previous; Season 2 Next → Season 4

The third season of the American television series Black Lightning, which is based on the DC Comics character Jefferson Pierce / Black Lightning, premiered on The CW on October 7, 2019. The season is produced by Berlanti Productions, Akil Productions, Warner Bros. Television, and DC Entertainment. It was ordered in January 2019 and production began that July, with Salim Akil once again serving as showrunner.

The season continues to follow Jefferson, a high school principal-turned-teacher and re-emerged superhero Black Lightning, in his fight against the corrupt government agency known as the A.S.A. as they occupy his community of Freeland, as well as new threats from the country of Markovia. The mid-season finale and ninth episode of the season also ties into the Arrowverse crossover event "Crisis on Infinite Earths" and leads into Black Lightning's appearance in the crossover. Cress Williams stars as Jefferson, along with principal cast members China Anne McClain, Nafessa Williams, Marvin "Krondon" Jones III, Christine Adams, Damon Gupton, Jordan Calloway, and James Remar also returning from previous seasons.

== Episodes ==
Black Lightning, season 3 episodes
No. overall	No. in season	Title	Directed by	Written by	Original release date	U.S. viewers (millions)
30	1	"The Book of Occupation: Chapter One: Birth of Blackbird"	Salim Akil	Salim Akil	October 7, 2019	0.89
While detained by the A.S.A., Jefferson is one of several apparent metahumans who are interviewed by their A.I. Meanwhile, a woman named Jamillah Olsen reports on the emergence of a new vigilante called Blackbird in the absence of Black Lightning. An A.S.A. holding facility is attacked by Markovians led by a metahuman named Ned Creegan / Cyclotronic. Commander Carson Williams, reporting to Agent Odell, slays the Markovians and threatens Deputy Chief Henderson into issuing a press conference regarding a new curfew. Gambi informs Anissa that Commander Williams is a metahuman who can mimic the abilities of other metas. Jennifer practices controlling her powers and Lynn is reunited with Jefferson, who starts to see through things even without his suit. By way of Issa's truth-extracting powers, an aging Tobias expresses ignorance of the briefcase's whereabouts and reveals that Martin Proctor worked under Odell, who works for the President of the United States. Having served his purpose, Odell then fatally poisons Issa. As Blackbird takes the Green Light metahumans through the A.S.A.'s perimeter, she is hit by a rocket blast. Her body is later found by the Perdi, led by Anaya's father. Elsewhere, Lala awakens next to the mysterious briefcase.
31	2	"The Book of Occupation: Chapter Two: Maryam's Tasbih"	Oz Scott	Charles D. Holland	October 14, 2019	0.63
As the A.S.A. takes control of outgoing media broadcasts from within Freeland's enclosed perimeter, the Markovians plot their next move. Jefferson and Lynn are moved to an upgraded holding room for the A.S.A. to better monitor their activities. Lynn assists the camouflaging metahuman Maryam Luqman through her failing health. Jennifer tampers with the Pierce home's surveillance, promoting a visit from Agent Odell. Jennifer covers up Anissa's disappearance while arranging for them to be contacted by their parents. Gambi enlists Henderson to help him obtain an A.S.A. device needed to find Anissa. In the Perdi community, Anaya and her father Thierry house Blackbird, but clash with her when Blackbird insists that they house other suspected metahumans. During the power testing, Maryam collapses. Jennifer breaks up a fight at school, Lala starts to lead the remnants of the 100, and Jamillah continues broadcasting until she is shut down by the A.S.A. With a brain chip in a revived Painkiller's head, Agent Odell sends him to kill his mother. Jefferson learns from Maryam that Agent Odell is making the other metahumans fight each other. After getting through to Anissa, Gambi coordinates her attacks on the approaching Markovian soldiers.
32	3	"The Book of Occupation: Chapter Three: Agent Odell's Pipe-Dream"	Benny Boom	Pat Charles	October 21, 2019	0.61
As a virus spreads among the A.S.A.'s detained metahumans, Henderson visits Sergeant King, who admits to being a metahuman as a result of having taken Green Light. Before succumbing to the virus, she directs Henderson to get money she had stashed for her husband Herbert. To win Jefferson over, Odell gives him a watch that manifests a new Black Lightning suit. Odell then attempts to torture Tobias for information regarding the briefcase, to no avail. While Henderson gives the money to Herbert, Lynn reports to Odell that the virus is man-made and suspects that Dr. Helga Jace made it for the Markovians, who used Cyclotronic as their carrier. Anissa reunites with Grace Choi and breaks off her brief fling with Jamillah. After claiming that the Markovians killed Nichelle, Odell ropes Lightning into attacking a facility where Black Lightning had just rescued A.S.A. commandos, including Major Sara Grey, and discovered that Jace was not there. Painkiller complies with Odell's order to raid a house and slays the Markovians hiding out there. Jefferson and Lynn are released from A.S.A. custody and reunite with their daughters. Tobias has a hallucination of Black Lightning taunting him.
33	4	"The Book of Occupation: Chapter Four: Lynn's Ouroboros"	Mary Lou Belli	Adam Giaudrone	October 28, 2019	0.52
Upon returning to Garfield High, Jefferson is informed by Principal Lowry that the A.S.A. has ordered him to reassign Jefferson to the role of guidance counselor. Meanwhile, Major Grey informs Henderson that the A.S.A. is now using the police station as a holding area in light of the meta disease outbreak. Odell warns Jennifer of the danger posed by Markovia and Gambi informs Jefferson that he's secretly marked the A.S.A.'s vehicles. Jefferson meets Grace, learning of her abilities, and clashes with Anissa regarding her Blackbird activities. Lowry is knocked out while trying to prevent Major Grey from taking a suspected metahuman student named Tavon out of class and Jefferson enlists Blackbird to break him out. Painkiller targets those who have been raiding the A.S.A. convoys and poisons their leader, Sinzell Johnson of The 100. Odell visits Jefferson about Black Lightning's supposed involvement with Blackbird's attack. After testing it on herself, Lynn informs Odell that the vaccine to cure the meta disease is working. Odell and Major Grey note that Lynn is unaware that she has become addicted to Green Light. Later that night, Odell provides Lightning with a new suit that enables her to survive beyond Earth's atmosphere.
34	5	"The Book of Occupation: Chapter Five: Requiem for Tavon"	Robert Townsend	Brusta Brown & John Mitchell Todd	November 11, 2019	0.71
As Tavon hides among the Perdi, Odell runs an algorithm to uncover Blackbird's identity. Lynn has a nightmare of a young meta dying during a test, which gives her an idea about how to stabilize the meta gene. Odell offers Tobias as a test patient, who informs Lynn that he knows her family's secrets. Jefferson convinces a reluctant Anissa to retrieve Tavon on behalf of his concerned parents, who maintain that he's not a meta, and Odell sends Painkiller to deal with Blackbird. Meanwhile, Odell visits Anissa's apartment. Grace poses as Anissa to throw off Odell's suspicions with Gambi and AI Shonda's help. Tavon succumbs to Painkiller's poison, prompting the students at Garfield High to act out against the A.S.A. soldiers, who beat up Jefferson for defending the students. Jennifer's new classmate Brandon stops her from intervening, revealing himself to her as an energy-absorbing metahuman. Jennifer informs Odell of what his soldiers did and Odell assures her that they will be punished. Later, the soldiers are visited by Lightning. Facing public scrutiny for his complicity with the A.S.A.'s occupation, Henderson seemingly arrests outspoken rebels Two-Bits and Reverend Holt, but actually recruits them for the resistance against the A.S.A.
35	6	"The Book of Resistance: Chapter One: Knocking on Heaven's Door"	Jeff Byrd	Lamont Magee	November 18, 2019	0.62
Anissa prepares a goodbye video in the event of her death. Thirty hours earlier at Tavon's funeral, Lynn denounces retaliation. Tobias threatens Lynn into providing him with information on the A.S.A.'s metahuman inventory, though she withholds the files on Erica and Wendy Hernandez. Gambi confirms that Anissa's poisoning is terminal, reluctantly agreeing to keep this secret while he works on a cure. Jennifer breaks into Brandon's apartment and after a brief altercation with him, learns of his geokinetic abilities and his vendetta against Helga Jace, who killed his mother. Henderson recruits Jamillah to be the voice of the Resistance. Odell confronts Jefferson for breaking their agreement by going rogue as Black Lightning. The metahuman mercenary Instant and Markovian Colonel Yuri Mosin infiltrate an A.S.A base and escape after being thwarted by Odell and Black Lightning. Finding Anissa collapsed, Grace calls Gambi, who produces an anti-venom. Grace stays with Anissa as she heals and Gambi goes to Khalil's grave, discovering his empty coffin. At the Markovians' camp, Colonel Mosin plots with Jace to steal Lynn's metahuman stabilization method. Lynn, experiencing audio-visual distortions and frustrated at Jefferson for continuing to risk their family's safety without her knowledge, moves out.
36	7	"The Book of Resistance: Chapter Two: Henderson's Opus"	Oz Scott	Lynelle White	November 25, 2019	0.65
Jennifer meets with Major Grey, who has taken over the A.S.A.'s operations while Odell recuperates from his wounds. Jennifer agrees to work with Major Grey in exchange for information on Helga Jace. Lynn continues testing Erica with assistance from a new scientist, Dr. Matthew Blair, and convinces a reluctant Major Grey to give her access to the other Green Light metas. With her powers yet to return, Anissa attempts to help Grace control her shapeshifting. Lynn sneaks a disguised Gambi into the Pit where they find Painkiller, confirming Gambi's suspicion that the A.S.A. revived him. After learning of his past missions, they agree not to tell Jennifer, but Lynn vows to save Khalil. After thwarting the Resistance's bomb plot, Jefferson is confronted by Henderson. Jennifer and Brandon experiment with combining their powers. With Grace unable to control her shapeshifting, Anissa enlists Black Lightning to sneak Grace and other suspected metas out of Freeland. When they're nearly discovered, Grace is forced to kill an A.S.A. soldier in self-defense. Once Jefferson catches up with her, she reveals that she knows his secret identity. As Jennifer acquires the information on Jace, Painkiller learns that Black Lightning is his next target.
37	8	"The Book of Resistance: Chapter Three: The Battle of Franklin Terrace"	Neema Barnette	Jake Waller	December 2, 2019	0.60
Anissa's powers return and Gambi shows her that the A.S.A.'s occupation of Freeland has been reported by the outside media as a SARS outbreak containment. To prevent the A.S.A. from using him to finish the meta gene stabilizer and weaponize the young metas, Tobias suggests that Lynn give him Maryam's camouflage abilities so that he can escape. Henderson tells Jefferson that Commander Williams, the A.S.A.'s new acting director of operations in wake of Major Grey's incapacitation, plans to make the Franklin Terrace apartment complex an A.S.A. base. However, when tenant Ms. Shepard refuses to move out, Henderson recruits Jefferson to convince her otherwise. Instead, Ms. Shepard stands her ground and Black Lightning is joined by Thunder and the Resistance to defend her. Painkiller battles Thunder, who learns that he is Khalil, and Black Lightning defeats Commander Williams in an electrical duel. Thunder then goes to help Gambi and a technopathic pod meta named Baron / TC, so that Jamillah can report the truth of Freeland's occupation to the outside world. Afterwards, Gambi helps Lynn escape the Pit when it goes into lockdown, but she accidentally leaves her bag containing the virus cures and her personal drugs behind.
38	9	"The Book of Resistance: Chapter Four: Earth Crisis" (Note: The episode was originally titled "The Book of Resistance: Chapter Four: Third Stone From the Sun".)	Tasha Smith	Lamont Magee	December 9, 2019	0.90
Jennifer makes a video for Anissa, explaining her conflicted feelings about working with Odell and the A.S.A. The Resistance learn that the A.S.A. intercepted and altered their message to the outside world. Knowing that the A.S.A. will soon strike back, Anissa tells Jefferson about Khalil's resurrection and that killing may be necessary. After Odell tells Jennifer she'll soon have to pick a side, Jennifer waits at Anissa's apartment to talk to her in person. As the skies turn red, Jennifer begins phasing out of reality before she collapses. In a dark void, she encounters two doppelgängers of herself from parallel universes. Gen of Earth-1 sided against the A.S.A. by taking away all metahuman powers in Freeland, resulting in Odell imprisoning her in the Pit and later executing Jefferson, the Secretary of Education. Jinn of Earth-2 sided with the A.S.A. and ended the Markovian war by becoming a power-obsessed killer, resulting in her murdering her entire family. Jennifer begins to understand the downfalls of having too little and too much power as an anti-matter wave wipes out Gen and Jinn. As the Pierce family tries to bring Jennifer back, the anti-matter wave overtakes them before Jefferson vanishes. This episode ties into the Arrowverse crossover event "Crisis on Infinite Earths" and leads into Black Lightning's appearances in Part Three and Part Five of the crossover.
39	10	"The Book of Markovia: Chapter One: Blessings and Curses Reborn"	Eric Laneuville	J. Allen Brown	January 20, 2020	0.54
Following his role in the Crisis, (Note: As depicted in "Crisis on Infinite Earths".) Jefferson returns to Freeland and reunites with Jennifer and Gambi. Though Gambi has no knowledge of the event, he detects anti-matter traces on the Pierces and warns Jefferson that unforeseen changes may have occurred. Despite being resolute in killing Odell, Jennifer leaves to check on Lynn at Jefferson's suggestion while he checks on Anissa. As Jennifer finds Lynn in a desperate state, Major Grey informs Odell that Carson is almost healed and that Jennifer hasn't responded to their calls. After coming home to find Lynn addicted to a modified Green Light, Jefferson gets a call from Henderson about the rebellion's latest mission. Dr. Blair continues working on Lynn's vaccine as Major Grey pairs Sergeant Gardner Grayle with Specialist Travis, who was implanted with a control chip. The pair capture Jennifer and Brandon, though they later break free and Sergeant Grayle discovers Travis' chip. With Anissa taking the lead, Jefferson and the rebels free the captured metahumans. Meanwhile, TC finds his way into Gambi's secret room and learns of his connection to Freeland's heroes before using his powers to track down Gambi's would-be killer: Lady Eve. Elsewhere, Jennifer tells Odell she's done working for him.
40	11	"The Book of Markovia: Chapter Two: Lynn's Addiction"	Michael Schultz	André Edmonds	January 27, 2020	0.66
Sergeant Grayle pre-records a message in case anything happens to him before agreeing to help Lynn sneak Tobias out of the Pit. After meeting Brandon and learning how Agent Odell used Jennifer, Jefferson speaks to Gambi and meets TC. After Jefferson goes to meet with Anissa, TC tells a disbelieving Gambi that Lady Eve called the hit on him and her off-shore accounts are still active. Hearing about a business not taking The 100's protection money, Lala sends Devonte to investigate and learns a resurrected Lady Eve is running it. He attempts to make her submit, but fails. Black Lightning, Thunder, and Gambi intercept Odell's convoy and bluff him so Gambi can simulate his online appearance, prompting Major Grey to dispatch Painkiller. After revealing herself as Lightning to Brandon and leaving him at Gambi's base, Jennifer goes to confront Odell. Though shocked to discover that Khalil is alive as Painkiller, Lightning knocks him out, but the A.S.A. has already evacuated Odell. Upon reading Khalil's cybernetics, TC tells Jennifer that Khalil still loves her. Jefferson learns that Odell is being sent to Gotham City. Meanwhile, Lynn and Sergeant Grayle successfully get Tobias out, but are subdued by a Markovian operative who calls for Mosin to send Instant.
41	12	"The Book of Markovia: Chapter Three: Motherless ID"	Bille Woodruff	Adam Giaudrone & Lynelle White	February 3, 2020	0.72
In Markovia after filming her latest findings, Helga Jace plans to win Lynn's trust. They get into a fight, but Mosin stops them; telling Lynn he knows about her work through his double agent Nurse Michael Allen before leaving her a sample of Green Light to help stabilize the Markovians' metahumans. Lynn asks for Jace's help in controlling her withdrawal symptoms. Back in Freeland, Jefferson and Anissa head to Lynn's apartment and meet Sergeant Grayle, who says the Markovians have Lynn. Jefferson has Grayle arrange a parley with the A.S.A. Meanwhile, TC finds that Khalil's Painkiller programming is keeping him from accessing the real Khalil. With Gambi and Jennifer's help, they create a firewall to trap the programming. Through Jennifer, Khalil learns what the A.S.A. had done to him and tells her they can't be together. Agreeing to allow Black Lightning and his allies to assist in rescuing Lynn under the condition that they become off limits afterwards, Major Grey has Erica Moran chipped with a kill switch should Lynn be beyond rescuing. Jace informs Mosin that she has earned Lynn's trust. Black Lightning, Gambi, Thunder, and Lightning get TC and Grace to help them in their upcoming raid on Markovia.
42	13	"The Book of Markovia: Chapter Four: Grab the Strap"	Salim Akil	Charles D. Holland & Asheleigh O. Conley	February 10, 2020	0.65
Mosin's superiors send their metahuman operative Gravedigger to take over the operation and use his mind control ability to make Lynn work faster. TC detects the chip in Moran's neck and deactivates it. As the Pierces and their allies mobilize for the operation, Khalil decides to join them. During the flight to Markovia, Grayle tells Jefferson of the A.S.A.'s kill switches as TC states that he deactivated the one in Moran. Upon landing, Black Lightning, Thunder, and Moran make their way to Lynn's lab while Lightning, Brandon, Khalil, and Grayle make their way to Tobias. Brandon splits off after seeing Helga Jace, forcing Grayle to go after him. As a result of her Green Light serums, Lynn discovers she gained temporary power mimicry, so she uses them to copy Gravedigger's and turn the tables on Mosin before Lightning rescues her. Black Lightning helps rescue Tobias, who says he knows his identity before the former knocks him out. As Khalil engages Gravedigger, Brandon finds Jace and nearly kills her until Grayle stops him and has them evacuated. The group nearly make it onto the helicopter, but Gravedigger catches up and stops them. Lynn surrenders herself until Black Lightning arrives and shocks Gravedigger into unconsciousness, allowing everyone to escape on the plane.
43	14	"The Book of War: Chapter One: Homecoming"	Benny Boom	Brusta Brown & John Mitchell Todd	February 24, 2020	0.64
Agent Odell fulfills the conditions of Lynn's rescue while the Pierces come clean with each other and their loved ones. Lady Eve learns about the briefcase Lala has. When they come together for a meeting, she reveals she invented the mind control program used on him before using it to make him serve her. With Jennifer beside him, Brandon gets answers about his mother from Helga Jace, who says his father killed her with his own geokinetic abilities, which Brandon inherited from him. Painkiller nearly escapes the firewall. While Khalil fights him off, he remains distant from Jennifer. The Perdi contact Anissa for help after the Markovians attack them, so Thunder, Grace, and Black Lightning rescue the refugees and defeat the Markovians. Gambi's is attacked by twin assassins sent by Lady Eve, but he defeats them before meeting with Lady Eve herself. Due to their shared connection with the A.S.A., she gives him the briefcase. With Jefferson and Lynn present, Gambi reveals the briefcase's contents, which further reveals that the United States was responsible for the Markovian situation and Gravedigger. As Lynn realizes she left the meta-boost formula behind in Markovia, the Markovians use it on Gravedigger before he kills Colonel Mosin.
44	15	"The Book of War: Chapter Two: Freedom Ain't Free"	Oz Scott	Pat Charles	March 2, 2020	0.62
Gravedigger films his life story before he leads the Markovian invasion, having analyzed everyone who rescued Lynn. Black Lightning and Thunder visit Lala and the 100 remnants to get their assistance in fighting off the Markovians, but fail to convince them. Lady Eve meets with Agent Odell to inform him on the briefcase's whereabouts and of Lazarus Prime's survival in exchange for regaining her seat on the Shadow Board. When Khalil is attacked by Markovian soldiers, Painkiller breaks free and slays them before trapping Khalil behind the firewall. Lynn tells Jefferson that his DNA matches Gravedigger's, revealing that they are related. Anissa and Grace invite everyone to their apartment for their engagement. Brandon has Helga Jace with him so that she can have her talk about his father. After meeting with Lady Eve, Lala has Dr. Blair tortured for Tobias' location. When Gravedigger arrives, Lightning confronts him, but gets thrown against the perimeter wall, powering it down. Black Lightning rescues and resuscitates her before he is forced to fight Gravedigger.
45	16	"The Book of War: Chapter Three: Liberation"	Salim Akil	Charles D. Holland	March 9, 2020	0.55
As Jefferson fights Gravedigger, the latter's commandos kidnap Jennifer, forcing the former to retreat and recruit Brandon to help rescue her. Odell tasks his agents with cleaning up the A.S.A.'s mess before they pull out of Freeland, with Williams killing Helga Jace. In Markovia, Tobias approaches Nurse Allen, demanding he take him to Markovia's metas. Painkiller tries to attack, but Khalil breaks free and defeats him. Despite his previous hesitation, Lala leads the 100 in an attack on the Markovians on the streets. Lynn finishes the anti-booster just as Williams arrives to kill her and she kills him in self-defense. Henderson helps Jefferson neutralize the Markovians guarding the Pit, but gets killed. Gravedigger encounters Anissa and Grace, forcing them to fight before Jennifer, Brandon, and Jefferson arrive. Odell sets the Pit to self-destruct, but TC sees this in time as Gambi warns everyone. Lynn uses the anti-booster to remove Gravedigger's additional powers, allowing everyone to evacuate. Jefferson brings Odell to justice. Grey arrives at Gambi's shop along with her elite operatives, but Gambi and TC kill them all. Anissa learns Grace is in a coma. It is revealed that Gravedigger survived The Pit's explosion and that Lynn is still consuming Green Light. Though Markovia's prime minister denies what happened in Freeland, the Pierces present the briefcase to a congressional committee as evidence of their and the A.S.A.'s experiments.

== Cast and characters ==
=== Main ===
- Cress Williams as Jefferson Pierce / Black Lightning
- China Anne McClain as Jennifer Pierce / Lightning
- Nafessa Williams as Anissa Pierce / Blackbird / Thunder
- Christine Adams as Lynn Stewart
- Marvin "Krondon" Jones III as Tobias Whale
- Damon Gupton as Bill Henderson
- Jordan Calloway as Khalil Payne / Painkiller
- James Remar as Peter Gambi

=== Recurring ===
- Bill Duke as Agent Percy Odell
- Rafael Castillo as Devonte Jones
- Will Catlett as Latavius "Lala" Johnson / Tattoo Man
- Clifton Powell as Reverend Jeremiah Holt
- Adetinpo Thomas as Jamillah Olsen
- Justin Livingston as Cloaked Gambi
- Sh'Kia Augustin as the voice of Shonda
- Jasun Jabbar Wardlaw Jr. as Tavon Singley
- Thomas K. Belgry as Colonel Yuri Mosin
- Chantal Thuy as Grace Choi
- Jahking Guillory as Brandon Marshall / Geo
- Katy O'Brian as Major Sara Grey
- Vernika Rowe as Auntie Gina
- Taylor Polidore as Lisa
- Tosin Morohunfola as Instant
- Boone Platt as Sergeant Gardner Grayle
- Renell Gibbs as Kyrie
- Jason Louder as Frank "Two-Bits" Tanner
- Jennifer Riker as Dr. Helga Jace
- Christopher A'mmanuel as Baron / TC
- Wayne Brady as Tyson Sykes / Gravedigger

=== Guest ===
- Zoe Renee as Maryam Luqman
- Christopher B. Duncan as Commander Carson Williams
- Chase Alexander as Ned Creegan / Cyclotronic
- Myles Truitt as Issa Williams
- Warren "WAWA" Snipe as Thierry
- Birgundi Baker as Anaya
- Euseph Messiah as Nurse Michael Allen
- P. J. Byrne as Principal Mike Lowry
- Gabrielle Garcia as Erica Moran
- Tosin Morohunfola as Instant
- Brandon Hirsch as Dr. Matthew Blair
- Jill Scott as Evelyn Stillwater-Ferguson / Lady Eve
- Jennifer Christa Palmer as Representative Nagar
- Tony Isabella as Judge Isabella
- Trevor Von Eeden as Judge von Eeden

== Production ==
=== Development ===
On January 31, 2019, The CW renewed the series for its third season. On the early renewal of Black Lightning as well as other series, network president Mark Pedowitz released a statement reading, "The early renewal of these signature CW series gives us a head start on laying out the 2019-20 season, and this is just the beginning. These shows provide a strong foundation for our multiplatform programming strategy, and we look forward to building on this with even more returning and new shows as we approach the May upfront." Executive producer and series developer Salim Akil returned to serve as the season's showrunner. On January 7, 2020, The CW renewed the series for a fourth season.

=== Writing ===
Lead actor Cress Williams revealed that the third season's narrative would begin approximately a month and a half after the season two finale. He also observed that the season picks up with the Pierce family "a little disjointed" and that Jefferson's immediate focus, shared with his ex-wife Lynn, would be to "keep both of [their] daughters out of the war that's coming." After the fictional Eastern European country of Markovia was revealed as the entity responsible for the season two villains known as the Masters of Disaster and that the nation had been building up its own metahuman army, Williams teased that the third season would see the world of the series "getting bigger" with Markovia becoming the source of a number of new metahumans, both heroes and villains. Showrunner Salim Akil described Markovia as "a small, power-hungry regime" that seeks to "weaponize" Freeland's metahumans. He also stated that, while everyday life in Freeland would still be a focus of the season, "we want our stories to talk about concerns not just for black folk but for people in general. We'll cover mental health and addiction issues that affect the whole country." Williams' role in several episodes was reduced to accommodate his late-decision appearance in the Arrowverse's annual crossover event.

Discussing Jennifer's ongoing struggle to control her powers due to the emotional discovery of her abilities, actress China Anne McClain noted that, "When the season starts, we see that Jennifer is getting more powerful, stronger, and she's also getting more emotional. We can expect a combination of all three of those this season." Akil additionally disclosed that Jennifer being stronger than both her father and her sister on account of her unique ability to generate her own electricity would also raise the issue of who is ultimately in control amongst the three. Meanwhile, Nafessa Williams said of her character Anissa's journey, "Season one was about her understanding and discovering her powers, in season two she is kind of starting to perfect them and trust herself. Season three, she is a woman. She trusts that and she is from under the leadership of her father and she is always willing to take advice but sometimes her ideas and her ways of doing things and her mindset is different from her father's." As for Tobias, the main villain of the series' first two seasons who was last seen incarcerated, Akil stated that since "his powers are taken [off the table...] he's going to have to use his superior intelligence to work his way out — and not his brawn."

Jordan Calloway revealed that his character Khalil, who was thought to have perished during the previous season until re-emerging in the season finale, would "come back a little different" in season three. The sentiment was echoed by McClain, who additionally cast doubt on the future of their characters' romantic relationship. Calloway explained, "[Khalil] might go both sides, good or bad. We saw what he was doing under the control of Tobias, and now you add another huge big bad, Agent Odell, the stakes are much higher for him. [...] What happens when you cross an individual like that?" Speaking on the circumstances surrounding Khalil's return, Akil hinted that, "The A.S.A.'s Agent Odell thought it best to keep him in a pod until they [could] figure out what to do with him." Akil characterized Agent Odell as "a true American patriot, [which] makes him a deadly soldier" and shared that the Pierces would be reluctantly working alongside him in order to protect their community, as it was revealed in the second-season finale that Agent Odell knows of the Pierces' secret identities and abilities. Furthermore, Williams teased that Jefferson would be making "a really big sacrifice" this season that would reveal "a little bit more of his angrier side" and "[propel] him at the beginning of the season."

=== Casting ===
Main cast members Cress Williams, China Anne McClain, Nafessa Williams, Christine Adams, Marvin "Krondon" Jones III, Damon Gupton, Jordan Calloway, and James Remar return from previous seasons as Jefferson Pierce / Black Lightning, Jennifer Pierce / Lightning, Anissa Pierce / Thunder, Lynn Stewart, Tobias Whale, Bill Henderson, Khalil Payne / Painkiller, and Peter Gambi, respectively.

On October 10, 2019, it was announced that Wayne Brady would play a major recurring role this season as Tyson Sykes / Gravedigger, a World War II-era "super soldier" and American-turned-Markovian asset. On January 19, 2020, Gupton revealed that he had been let go from the series and this would be his final season as a series regular.

=== Design ===
This season features a new suit design for Jefferson Pierce as Black Lightning. In place of the previous suit's glowing blue and gold bolts across the chest, a textured gold design with blue and black weaving is featured throughout the torso, arms, and gloves. The mask is also slightly redesigned with dark red-tinted lenses. As Anissa Pierce officially takes on the name "Blackbird" this season as a second secret identity, she also receives a new costume for the alter-ego that consists of a black hood and a mask that covers the lower half of her face.

=== Filming ===
Production for the season began on July 9, 2019, in Atlanta, Georgia. A week of production was carved out for Williams to film his scenes for the Arrowverse crossover event "Crisis on Infinite Earths" in Vancouver, British Columbia. Filming for the third season concluded on January 21, 2020.

=== Arrowverse tie-ins ===
The mid-season finale and ninth episode of the season titled "The Book of Resistance: Chapter Four: Earth Crisis" ties into the Arrowverse crossover event "Crisis on Infinite Earths" and leads into Cress Williams' appearances as Black Lightning in Part Three and Part Five of the crossover. Following the event, Black Lightning officially joins the Arrowverse franchise and, beginning with the season's tenth episode, retroactively shares a new continuity with the other series of the shared universe, all of which now collectively inhabit the new world of Earth-Prime.

== Release ==
=== Broadcast ===
The third season premiered on The CW in the United States on October 7, 2019. The season was originally scheduled to debut two weeks later on October 21 prior to the reveal that Black Lightning would be involved in the Arrowverse crossover event "Crisis on Infinite Earths" on The CW. The series continues to air on Mondays at 9:00pm during the 2019–20 television season, but now airs following All American. The 16th and final episode of the season will air on March 9, 2020.

=== Home media ===
Having acquired the international distribution and streaming rights for Black Lightning, Netflix previously aired new episodes of the first two seasons weekly in regions outside of the United States, including Canada, Australia, and the United Kingdom. However, following the expiration of the deal between the streamer and the network, the third season will be added to Netflix internationally at a later date. The season was released in its entirety on Netflix in the United States on March 17, 2020, 8 days after the finale aired on The CW.

=== Marketing ===
Several of the season's main cast members attended San Diego Comic-Con on July 20, 2019, to promote the season. The first trailer of the season was released on September 24.

== Reception ==
=== Ratings ===
Viewership and ratings per episode of Black Lightning season 3
No.	Title	Air date	Rating/share (18–49)	Viewers (millions)	DVR (18–49)	DVR viewers (millions)	Total (18–49)	Total viewers (millions)
1	"The Book of Occupation: Chapter One: Birth of Blackbird"	October 7, 2019	0.3/1	0.89	0.2	0.54	0.5	1.43
2	"The Book of Occupation: Chapter Two: Maryam's Tasbih"	October 14, 2019	0.2/1	0.63	0.2	0.42	0.4	1.05
3	"The Book of Occupation: Chapter Three: Agent Odell's Pipe-Dream"	October 21, 2019	0.2/1	0.61	0.2	0.36	0.4	0.97
4	"The Book of Occupation: Chapter Four: Lynn's Ouroboros"	October 28, 2019	0.2/1	0.52	0.2	0.47	0.4	0.99
5	"The Book of Occupation: Chapter Five: Requiem for Tavon"	November 11, 2019	0.2/1	0.71	0.2	0.42	0.4	1.13
6	"The Book of Resistance: Chapter One: Knocking on Heaven's Door"	November 18, 2019	0.2/1	0.62	0.2	0.45	0.4	1.05
7	"The Book of Resistance: Chapter Two: Henderson's Opus"	November 25, 2019	0.2/1	0.65	0.2	0.43	0.4	1.08
8	"The Book of Resistance: Chapter Three: The Battle of Franklin Terrace"	December 2, 2019	0.2/1	0.60	0.2	0.45	0.4	1.05
9	"The Book of Resistance: Chapter Four: Earth Crisis"	December 9, 2019	0.3/1	0.90	0.2	0.52	0.5	1.42
10	"The Book of Markovia: Chapter One: Blessings and Curses Reborn"	January 20, 2020	0.2/1	0.54	0.2	0.40	0.4	0.94
11	"The Book of Markovia: Chapter Two: Lynn's Addiction"	January 27, 2020	0.2/1	0.66	0.2	0.40	0.4	1.06
12	"The Book of Markovia: Chapter Three: Motherless Id"	February 3, 2020	0.2	0.72	0.2	0.35	0.4	1.07
13	"The Book of Markovia: Chapter Four: Grab the Strap"	February 10, 2020	0.2	0.65	0.1	0.36	0.3	1.01
14	"The Book of War: Chapter One: Homecoming"	February 24, 2020	0.2	0.64	0.2	0.36	0.4	1.00
15	"The Book of War: Chapter Two: Freedom Ain't Free"	March 2, 2020	0.2	0.62	0.2	0.44	0.4	1.06
16	"The Book of War: Chapter Three: Liberation"	March 9, 2020	0.2	0.55	0.1	0.43	0.3	0.98

=== Critical response ===
The third season of Black Lightning has received generally positive reviews from professional critics. On the review aggregation website Rotten Tomatoes, the season holds an 89% approval rating, with an average rating of 7.92/10, based on 9 reviews.

Reviewing the premiere for Entertainment Weekly, Christian Holub gave the episode a "B+" grade, writing, "Black Lightning has been able to do a really good job of showcasing real-life racial dynamics and structural inequities through its comic-flavored storytelling. And in season 3, the show is aiming directly at our real-life crisis of family separation and putting kids in cages. [...] After a bit of a sophomore slump, I'm excited to see where Black Lightning goes from here." Nicole Hill of Den of Geek! assigned the premiere episode a rating of 4 out of 5. She opined that, "Black Lightning does a good job of playing with these different concepts of power and showing how they interact, overlap, and cancel each other out. [...] I hope this season maintains focus and doesn't find itself branching out too far away from its central conflicts. If the following episodes consistently operate at this level, this will be an exciting season to watch." The A.V. Club's Kyle Fowle gave the premiere a "B+" grade and added that, "The first episode of the third season is just as politically charged as previous episodes, but this time around things feel more relevant, more attuned to this specific time and place. Black Lightning has nodded towards real life events before, but this premiere, centered around kids being rounded up, separated from their families, and locked in detention camps with no idea of when they'll get out or what they did wrong, feels particularly pointed."
