= Black Lightning season 2 =

Black Lightning
- Season 2
- Promotional poster
- Starring: Cress Williams; China Anne McClain; Nafessa Williams; Christine Adams; Marvin "Krondon" Jones III; Damon Gupton; Jordan Calloway; James Remar
- No. of episodes: 16

Release
- Original network: The CW
- Original release: October 9, 2018 – March 18, 2019

Season chronology
- ← Previous; Season 1 Next → Season 3

The second season of the American television series Black Lightning, which is based on the DC Comics character Jefferson Pierce / Black Lightning, premiered on The CW on October 9, 2018, and ran for 16 episodes until March 18, 2019. The season was produced by Berlanti Productions, Akil Productions, Warner Bros. Television, and DC Entertainment. It was ordered in April 2018 and production began that June, with Salim Akil once again serving as showrunner.

The season continues to follow Jefferson, now a high school teacher who recently re-emerged from retirement as the superhero Black Lightning, as he fights against the local gang and criminal empire called The 100, as well as a corrupt government, in his community of Freeland. Cress Williams stars as Jefferson, along with principal cast members China Anne McClain, Nafessa Williams, Marvin "Krondon" Jones III, Christine Adams, Damon Gupton, and James Remar also returning from the previous season, while Jordan Calloway was promoted to the principal cast from his recurring status in season one.

== Episodes ==
Black Lightning, season 2 episodes
No. overall	No. in season	Title	Directed by	Written by	Original release date	U.S. viewers (millions)
14	1	"The Book of Consequences: Chapter One: Rise of the Green Light Babies"	Salim Akil	Salim Akil	October 9, 2018	1.16
Garfield High is shut down pending the school board's investigation into Jefferson's whereabouts during the assault. Meanwhile, Lynn is questioned by A.S.A. agent Percy Odell, who realizes that she's lying about not knowing what happened to Proctor or his team. Syonide confronts Kara Fowdy regarding Tobias' briefcase, only to end up dying by her hand. Kara makes a deal with Gambi to bring him the briefcase in exchange for her safe passage out of the life. Deputy Chief Henderson summons Black Lightning and informs him that he knows his identity. Jefferson removes his mask and Henderson leaves feeling betrayed. Families of the Green Light babies learn they must sue the government in order to see their loved ones. Jefferson tries to convince Anissa to let the system work, but Anissa decides to help the families by stealing money from drug dealers and giving it to the families for their legal fees. Jennifer's powers begin acting out and Lynn suggests to Jefferson that they both see a therapist. As Kara searches for the briefcase, Tobias harpoons her for killing Syonide, but Kara escapes through a window. Instead of letting the school close down, Jefferson decides to resign as principal.
15	2	"The Book of Consequences: Chapter Two: Black Jesus Blues"	Oz Scott	Charles D. Holland	October 16, 2018	1.02
A freed pod child kills an A.S.A. scientist, as well as himself with his electrokinetic powers. When another pod is opened, Lynn and the other scientists try to keep the frightened girl calm, but she uses her aerokinetic powers to escape. Lynn tells Jefferson, and Gambi reveals that her name is Wendy Hernandez. Lynn takes in Issa Williams, a young metahuman who was killed by police and subsequently rejected by his loved ones following his resurrection. When the Pierces start snapping at each other, they realize that Issa's powers force people reveal their darkest thoughts. Khalil visits Jennifer, who pushes him off the roof. Black Lightning confronts Wendy without Thunder, whom he feels is not being humble, but is forced to shock her out of a psychotic episode. With everyone she knew 30 years ago long gone, Wendy opts to go back into the pod until Lynn can find a cure for the metagene. Faced with the same choice, Issa instead decides to live for however long he has left. Jefferson officially resigns as principal, but tells his students that he will remain a teacher, with the students chanting his mantras in support.
16	3	"The Book of Consequences: Chapter Three: Master Lowry"	Rose Troche	Jan Nash	October 23, 2018	1.18
Black Lightning helps the police stop a Green Light victim who developed super-strength. Afterwards, Jefferson and Gambi discover that the security footage did not pick up Tobias Whale or Syonide as Jefferson plans to get some information from Painkiller. After seeing metal detectors set up at Garfield High, Jefferson meets the new principal Mike Lowry. Jennifer begins psychic therapy with Gambi's old contact, Perenna. At the persuasion of Agent Odell, Lynn enlists convicted criminal scientist Dr. Helga Jace to help with the pods. When the police find the burnt remains of Detective Summers and his car, Henderson has Jefferson look in on it as Black Lightning. In light of Syonide's death, Tobias forces Painkiller to work harder to fill the void. After looking into the arson case, Black Lightning informs Henderson that the culprit was hired by Tobias Whale. Gambi assists Anissa on a raid of a building owned by Zlovic to save a church-sponsored clinic from being shut down and Gambi finds Kara Fowdy badly wounded. While Black Lightning tries to reason with Painkiller, Tobias visits his sister's crypt, where Henderson arrests him. Henderson visits Jefferson to notify him that Tobias Whale has finally been apprehended.
17	4	"The Book of Consequences: Chapter Four: Translucent Freak"	Salli Richardson-Whitfield	Adam Giaudrone	October 30, 2018	0.97
During her therapy session with Perenna, Jennifer has a vision of fighting Painkiller, and later meets with Khalil in person. Henderson interrogates Tobias while Gambi advises a wounded Fowdy to come forward with what she knows about Tobias' briefcase. Jefferson confronts Anissa after hearing about what she was doing for the clinic from Gambi, and Anissa decides to move out. Jefferson breaks up a fight between two students, but Principal Lowry expels the one that started it and suspends the other; causing a disagreement between them. Smuggled in by Tobias' lawyer, Steven Connors meets with Tobias and they come up with a plan to bomb the clinic. A cryokinetic pod child suddenly dies under Lynn and Helga Jace's watch. While Black Lightning and Thunder reduce the bomb explosions, Gambi confronts the woman who planted them in a fight, but she gets away. The next day, District Attorney Mendez asks Jefferson about his experience of the day Alvin Pierce died. Before dying of her wounds, Fowdy gives her phone to Gambi. As Tobias is released from police custody, Jefferson and Lynn opt to have Jennifer home-schooled. Tobias tells the 100 "I'm back" as they celebrate this victory.
18	5	"The Book of Blood: Chapter One: Requiem"	Michael Schultz	Lamont Magee	November 13, 2018	0.90
Gambi is driven off the road and apparently killed. A grieving Jefferson, refusing to believe he's dead, starts investigating who attacked him. Anissa takes a job at the clinic at Reverend Holt's suggestion and becomes entangled in a conspiracy surrounding one of her patients; a pregnant young woman named Anaya. Tobias starts using the contents of the briefcase to his advantage, bringing city councilman Kwame Parker under his control, as he was previously assisted by Martin Proctor. After a night with Anissa, Grace starts to develop spots on her skin. Councilman Parker holds a press conference to say that the clinic has received an anonymous donor, but is forced to dodge questions about the source being Tobias. Anaya's boyfriend Deacon collapses at the clinic, begging Anissa to save the unborn child before dying and emitting a metal-like substance. Later on, Tobias has dinner with Painkiller, as he now considers him the only family he has left. Lynn believes she's found a way to save the pod children, but is double-crossed by Helga Jace, leading to the deaths of 14 patients. After talking to her father, Anissa heads to South Freeland where she runs into its sheriff, but leaves after seeing something crawling under his skin.
19	6	"The Book of Blood: Chapter Two: The Perdi"	Oz Scott	Pat Charles	November 20, 2018	0.99
Gambi is revealed to be alive, albeit in hiding, as he kills one of his attackers. Lynn shares the news of the deceased pod children to their angry families. In South Freeland, Anissa meets Anaya and her family, and learns they're of the Perdi, a group of black people that live in the woods of South Freeland. The other residents are the Sange, white people who are under the control of Looker via her Element. Anaya gives birth to twins: one black and one white. After Councilman Parker is unable to get Reverend Holt to relocate his clinic, Tobias sends Painkiller to take out Holt, though he does not go through with it. Tobias also reveals to Khalil that he was the one who paralyzed him. Khalil visits Jennifer, suggesting this could be their last meeting. Painkiller attacks Tobias, but is overpowered. When the Sange attack the Perdi, Black Lightning helps fight them off. As Anaya gets away with Anissa and one of her babies, Black Lightning follows the Element hoping to find Looker and the other baby. At Looker's home, her attempts to remove the substance from the baby she's taken fail.
20	7	"The Book of Blood: Chapter Three: The Sange"	Eric Laneuville	Keli Goff	November 27, 2018	1.06
Black Lightning continues to follow the Element to Looker's lair, only to be captured. After getting a vision from the Element in Anissa's possession, Looker leads a small group of Sange to retrieve the baby; leaving Black Lightning to fend off his captors and rescue the baby they took. After a talk with Perenna, Jennifer decides to speak to Khalil, who's currently on the run after Tobias learns he still has not killed Holt. As Looker and her gang arrive, Black Lightning and Thunder fight them off, with the latter wounding Looker to the point where she "bleeds" the Element in her body; freeing the Sange from her control. After planning to hand Looker over to the A.S.A., Jefferson later tracks Gambi to a hotel, where he learns he faked his death to spare the Pierce Family from whoever is after him. After Jennifer saves Painkiller by revealing her abilities to him, they decide to run away from Freeland; causing concern amongst the Pierces and forcing Tobias to call in a professional to deal with his traitorous underling.
21	8	"The Book of Rebellion: Chapter One: Exodus"	Tawnia McKiernan	Jake Waller	December 4, 2018	0.96
Tobias has placed a bounty on Painkiller, but wants him brought in alive. Black Lightning, Thunder, and Gambi begin their search for Jennifer, with Henderson providing assistance. Tobias visits Khalil's mom, who states that she has not made contact with him. Khalil and Jennifer make their way to the former's aunt, where the latter calls Anissa to let her family know she's okay. Meanwhile, Tobias calls in a British mercenary named Cutter to hunt down Khalil. She catches up to them as Khalil uses his bracers to keep his aunt safe. Khalil tries his best to hold off Cutter until Black Lightning and Thunder arrive; with Jennifer and Khalil sneaking out during the resulting fight. Once they're far enough, Jennifer uses her powers to short out a tracker in Khalil's head so Tobias cannot locate them again. As Black Lightning and Thunder continue their search, Cutter contacts Tobias to tell him Black Lightning got involved. This causes Tobias to start putting two and two together; remembering that Black Lightning came back only after Pierce's daughters were taken hostage.
22	9	"The Book of Rebellion: Chapter Two: Gift of the Magi"	Benny Boom	Adam Giaudrone	December 11, 2018	1.13
Due to a wound he received during his fight with Cutter, Khalil's health starts declining, so he and Jennifer are forced to hide out in a barn. Gambi finds blood at Khalil's aunt's house, leading to him, Black Lightning, and Thunder staking out the local hospitals. Lynn grows desperate to find Jennifer, leading her to reach out to Khalil's father, only to hit a dead end. Jennifer sneaks into a hospital and uses her abilities to get access to some medicine, unaware that Cutter's not far behind. Meanwhile, Tobias reaches out to Todd Green, a highly intelligent individual who has been constantly looked over. Gambi identifies the attacker as Giselle Cutter, who is rumored to be a low level telekinetic metahuman. Though Cutter locates Khalil, Jennifer subdues her and forces her to give her the antidote. Black Lightning and Thunder eventually locate the barn that Jen and Khalil were hiding in, only to find it empty. With Khalil fully recovered, he and Jen drive off to parts unknown. Elsewhere, an unnamed teleporting meta gets called to Freeland by an unknown individual.
23	10	"The Book of Rebellion: Chapter Three: Angelitos Negros"	Salim Akil	Jan Nash & J. Allen Brown	January 21, 2019	0.86
Gambi tracks Jennifer and Painkiller based on the radius of where they were. Cutter visits Tobias Whale and Todd Green, stating that she lost their trail. Jennifer and Painkiller get tired of running and return to Freeland so that they can stand up to Tobias Whale after being persuaded to by Lynn. At Jefferson's suggestion, they contact Deputy Chief Henderson to cut a deal where Khalil will turn himself over to the authorities in exchange for providing testimony against Tobias. One of the assistant district attorneys on Tobias' side informs him of this, so he sends Cutter to intercept. She kills the police officers in the convoy and makes off with Painkiller. Henderson informs Jefferson on what happened. Once Painkiller is brought to his lair, Tobias tears out his spinal implant and leaves him for dead; though he's found by Reverend Holt and the local churchgoers. Tobias is called down by Green, who cracked the briefcase's code, and find that the A.S.A. was developing metahumans for Project Masters of Disaster.
24	11	"The Book of Secrets: Chapter One: Prodigal Son"	Rob Hardy	Pat Charles	January 28, 2019	0.93
During a sermon, Reverend Holt faints from a poisoned handkerchief Cutter planted on him. Lynn enlists the A.S.A. doctors into helping treat Khalil after he's hospitalized. A civilian catches Jennifer composing on her SUV and calls 911, causing her to lose it and fry her SUV before Perenna intervenes. Todd finds info on his laptop about the A.S.A. and Helga Jace. After being informed about Holt's death, Jefferson and Gambi brings Henderson into the latter's lair to find a way to expose Tobias. Jennifer's suggestions to get Khalil into a pod are turned down as Lynn says the toxins in him are too great. Henderson visits Tobias' apartment to ask him about Painkiller, with Jefferson and Gambi listening on Henderson's earpiece. Todd breaks into Jace's cell, deactivates her ankle implant, and sets up a hologram of her so he can take her to Tobias, as she developed his anti-aging serum after the A.S.A. brought her from Markovia. Jen and Nichelle share their final moments with Khalil before he dies. Jace takes Tobias to the Freeland Clinic, where the remaining pods are, and breaks down a hidden door.
25	12	"The Book of Secrets: Chapter Two: Just and Unjust"	Jeff Byrd	Charles D. Holland	February 4, 2019	0.95
Lynn and Anissa are attacked by gunmen, though Agent Odell and the A.S.A. drive them off. After Gambi notices the coincidence, Lynn speaks to Odell, who still does not trust her, just before he arranges for Helga Jace's release. The gunmen target Perenna, but she repels them. Gambi identifies them as Markovian secret service and tells Jefferson so he can stop them. Unfortunately, Henderson is unable to arrest them because of their diplomatic immunity. While at school, janitors throw items from Khalil's memorial shrine away, so Jennifer retrieves them. However, Principal Lowry suspends her for it; greatly upsetting Jefferson. Elsewhere, Anissa tries to help a woman being abused by her boyfriend, a cop aligned with the 100, only to get shot for it. This finally convinces her she's being too reckless, so she plans to put the money she claimed towards Khalil's funeral. The Pierce family attend said funeral, while being watched from afar by Odell. With some of the pods in their possession, Tobias and Jace plan to make a metahuman army.
26	13	"The Book of Secrets: Chapter Three: Pillar of Fire"	Robert Townsend	Lamont Magee	February 11, 2019	0.94
Odell tells Lynn that Markovia has been making metahumans, suspecting that the Markovians who attacked her want her expertise. He suggests moving the pods, much to her chagrin as she's close to stabilizing them. Tobias is informed of the impending transfer, which he thinks might affect the briefcase; so he awakens Shakedown from his pod and sends him with Cutter to intercept. Helga Jace locks Lynn in a separate room, and though she's able to alert Black Lightning and Thunder, the heroes are too late to stop Tobias' henchmen. While investigating Grace's sudden disappearance, Anissa finds one of her pills and has Gambi analyze it; learning that it's used to treat schizophrenia and that "Grace Choi" is an alias. The incident between Lowry and Jennifer goes viral, which leads Napier to offer Jefferson his job back. Even in spite of Lowry however, he chooses to give his replacement another chance. Elsewhere, Anissa warns Jennifer to lie low, but she disobeys her to track down 100 members and demand Tobias' location. They nearly kill her, but Thunder rescues her. With Todd's usefulness at an end, Tobias has him killed by one of Cutter's car bombs.
27	14	"The Book of Secrets: Chapter Four: Original Sin"	Oz Scott	Pat Charles & Keli Goff	March 4, 2019	0.77
Lazarus Prime, an old associate of Lady Eve's, resurrects Lala to help him get revenge on Tobias for her death, but he confronts Pierce to ask about his late friend Earl. Despite some resistance, he remembers that he was the one who killed Earl before the 100 could. On his way out, he sees Earl's ghost as his tattoo manifests on his left abdomen. Lynn has a disagreement with Agent Odell on how to handle Wendy, which leads to the latter taking over the testing. As Thunder, Anissa goes to look for Grace and encounters a man who is secretly a form of Grace as she escapes. Jennifer tries out the first stage of her new costume with Gambi's help. Thanks to him, Henderson learned of Tobias' connection with Todd as his glasses were found at the scene of the explosion. Odell has the Pierce family put under surveillance. While recalling how Lazarus put him back together, Lala plans to redeem himself by renewing his revenge for Tobias.
28	15	"The Book of the Apocalypse: Chapter One: The Alpha"	Salim Akil	Jan Nash	March 11, 2019	0.75
The police put down Cape Guy, a veteran with PTSD, after he develops magnetic abilities. Jefferson tries to instill in his daughters a superhero's code, namely to not go on missions alone and to not kill, but Jennifer outwardly disagrees with the latter point. Helga Jace awakens Joe / Heatstroke, Darryl / Coldsnap, and Rebecca / New Wave from their pods. Anissa talks to Gambi about what she saw on search for Grace and they deduce that Grace may be a shapeshifter. After taking Jennifer's suggestion to enlist Perenna, Lynn tells Odell that Wendy must be readjusted to civilian life before she becomes one of his meta-soldiers. Tobias orders Heatstroke to attack Freeland, wherein he burns Councilman Parker alive and sets off several gas lines. Black Lightning and Thunder fight him until Tobias reluctantly orders Heatstroke to retreat. Lala finds Tobias's hideout, and proves immune to Cutter's attacks. She informs Tobias about Lala, causing the other Masters of Disaster to retreat as well. While keeping tabs on Tobias and Cutter, Gambi spots Jennifer in her unfinished suit. He alerts Black Lightning and goes in to stop her. Tobias and Cutter get away and Jennifer suddenly collapses, charged with too much power.
29	16	"The Book of the Apocalypse: Chapter Two: The Omega"	Salim Akil	Charles D. Holland	March 18, 2019	0.85
Gambi stabilizes Jennifer and Jefferson stumbles onto the pod kids' location. Helga Jace attempts to stop him, but Lynn takes her down. Jace offers them information in exchange for protection, but the teleporting bounty hunter Instant takes her for the Markovians. Tobias sends the Masters of Disaster, the 100, and the pod kids to cause a riot, but Black Lightning and Thunder are able to stop the prison metas with some unexpected assistance from Lala. Holt miraculously survives Cutter's poison and quickly returns to rallying the community. After Cutter leaves Tobias, Lala attacks him but is quickly incapacitated by a trigger word that Tobias uses to activate all of Lala's tattoos at once. Now calling herself Lightning, Jennifer storms in to enact her revenge on Tobias for killing Khalil. However, Jefferson arrives and is able to talk Jennifer down in favor of having Tobias sent to a metahuman prison called The Pit. Odell is revealed to have Issa, Wendy, and Khalil in the pods. As the Pierces celebrate their victory, Odell reveals that he knows their secret identities. He tells them that the Markovians are coming to Freeland and that the A.S.A. is swearing them in for the inevitable war.

== Cast and characters ==
=== Main ===
- Cress Williams as Jefferson Pierce / Black Lightning
- China Anne McClain as Jennifer Pierce / Lightning
- Nafessa Williams as Anissa Pierce / Thunder
- Christine Adams as Lynn Stewart
- Marvin "Krondon" Jones III as Tobias Whale
- Damon Gupton as Bill Henderson
- Jordan Calloway as Khalil Payne / Painkiller
- James Remar as Peter Gambi

=== Recurring ===
- Robert Townsend as Napier Frank
- Skye P. Marshall as Kara Fowdy
- Clifton Powell as Reverend Jeremiah Holt
- Bill Duke as Agent Percy Odell
- Myles Truitt as Issa Williams
- Chantal Thuy as Grace Choi
- Madison Bailey as Wendy Hernandez
- Erika Alexander as Perenna
- P.J. Byrne as Principal Mike Lowry
- Jennifer Riker as Dr. Helga Jace
- Yolanda T. Ross as Nichelle Payne
- Birgundi Baker as Anaya
- Eric Lynch as Councilman Kwame Parker
- Kearran Giovanni as Giselle Cutter
- RJ Cyler as Todd Green
- Hosea Chanchez as Marcus Bishop / Shakedown
- William Catlett as Latavius "Lala" Johnson / Tattoo Man

=== Guest ===
- Charlbi Dean as Syonide
- Kyanna Simone Simpson as Kiesha
- Angela Rye as herself
- Benjamin L. Crump as himself
- Andy Allo as Zoe B.
- Joshua Mikel as Steven Connors
- Salli Richardson-Whitfield as ADA Montez
- Rob Morean as Deacon
- Jason Louder as Frank "Two-Bits" Tanner
- Sofia Vassilieva as Looker
- Warren "WAWA" Snipe as Thierry
- Charmin Lee as Batina
- Tosin Morohunfola as Instant
- Catherine Dyer as Dr. Ashton Conley
- Dabier Snell as Will
- Michael Wright as Lazarus Prime
- Tracey Bonner as Lawanda White
- Brooke Ence as Rebecca Jones / New Wave
- Derrick Lewis as Darryl Robinson / Coldsnap
- Esteban Cueto as Joe / Heatstroke

== Production ==
=== Development ===
On April 2, 2018, The CW renewed the series for its second season. On the renewal of Black Lightning as well as other series, network president Mark Pedowitz released a statement reading, "As The CW expands to a six-night, Sunday-through-Friday schedule next season, we are proud to have such a deep bench of great returning series for 2018-19. By picking these 10 series up for next season, we have a terrific selection of programming to choose from when we set our fall schedule in May, with more still to come. And I'm especially happy that we'll continue to work with the incredibly talented casts, producers and writers who create the series our fans are so passionate about." Executive producer and series developer Salim Akil returned to serve as the season's showrunner. On January 31, 2019, The CW renewed the series for a third season shortly after production on the second season had wrapped.

=== Writing ===
In keeping with the "less procedural and more serialized" nature of the series compared to The CW's other superhero offerings, the second season features many of the same villains that were present in the first season, including Tobias Whale, Syonide, and Khalil Payne / Painkiller. Showrunner Salim Akil commented, "I don't want to introduce too many villains. I want us to settle in now that we know everyone. We know what the A.S.A. is, we know who Tobias is, so now we can really tell some grounded stories about our villains, our heroes, the people in Freeland." While Tobias and Syonide continue to act as straight-up villains, Khalil presents "a much more compelling emotional storyline as Jennifer [searches] for a way to redeem the love of her life." Akil said that there would additionally be "other forces in Freeland and outside of Freeland" that would come into play as sources of conflict. Cress Williams described the season as "harder hitting and a little bit darker" than the series' debut outing, but indicated that the second season would build upon the foundation of the first.

Akil revealed that the season would be organized into smaller arcs known as "books" to mimic the style of the comic book source material, and that "consequences" would be the theme of the season's first book. Specifically, he said that the season would "deal with the consequences of having discovered the pod children; the consequences of Green Light hitting the streets; and the consequences of Jefferson's daughters discovering they have powers." On the decision to begin the season by examining the consequences of the first season, Akil explained, "I didn't want to just stop and then start some whole new story. I wanted to see what the consequences were for the city of Freeland, as well as for the family. What are the effects of Green Light in the community? What does that do? It's giving people an excuse to shoot first and ask questions later." Furthering the season's objective to "give a nod to comic books in a stronger way," Akil also said that the season would feature more metahumans.

On the relevant social issues that the season would address and on how the consequences of the first season would play out for the Pierce family personally, Akil stated, "I wanted to talk about black people and therapy. We don't believe in that shit, but we're the number one people who need it." China Anne McClain praised the decision to give her character a therapist as a way of controlling her powers, noting that in season one, "Jennifer had so many psychological issues with getting these powers. She did not want them. She already felt like an outsider being a part of this amazing family, and living on the house on top of the hill, and so adding super powers on top of it just made things worse for her." Conversely, Nafessa Williams shared that her character would continue to embrace her powers through her work as a superhero, elaborating that Anissa now "feels confident navigating the superhero world without her father, and she feels fully confident and able to do it on her own." Regarding the Pierce siblings opposing reactions to gaining superpowers, McClain said, "It's gonna bring them together in certain ways and then push them apart in others. You're gonna see a lot of different ups and downs in their relationship this season."

=== Casting ===
Main cast members Cress Williams, China Anne McClain, Nafessa Williams, Christine Adams, Marvin "Krondon" Jones III, Damon Gupton, and James Remar return from the previous season as Jefferson Pierce / Black Lightning, Jennifer Pierce, Anissa Pierce / Thunder, Lynn Stewart, Tobias Whale, Bill Henderson, and Peter Gambi, respectively. On July 21, 2018, at San Diego Comic-Con, it was announced that Jordan Calloway had been promoted to a series regular for the second season after previously recurring during the first season as Khalil Payne / Painkiller.

On August 8, 2018, it was reported that Myles Truitt would play Issa Williams during the season in a recurring capacity. On September 5, Sofia Vassilieva was announced in the role of Looker, based on the DC Comics character of the same name. On September 21, it was reported that Kearran Giovanni would recur as Cutter, a British mercenary. On October 4, it was revealed that Erika Alexander had booked a three-episode recurring role as Jennifer's telepathic therapist, Perenna, though she ultimately appeared in a total of eight episodes. Robert Townsend and Bill Duke were added as recurring characters Dr. Napier Frank and Agent Percy Odell, respectively, on October 9. On November 13, RJ Cyler was cast in the recurring role of "gangly and awkward tech genius" Todd Green. On January 21, 2019, it was announced that Hosea Chanchez had been cast to recur as Marcus Bishop / Shakedown.

=== Design ===
This season introduces the first official superhero costume for Jennifer Pierce as she takes on the moniker "Lightning" from the comic book source material. The costume echoes that of Anissa Pierce, Jennifer's older sister who operates as the superhero Thunder, in that it is a black body suit covered in yellow plating. However, the Lightning costume also features lightning-inspired designs.

=== Filming ===
Production for the season began on June 26, 2018, in Atlanta, Georgia. The back lot used during filming was the same one used by The CW's previous Atlanta-based television series, The Vampire Diaries. Salli Richardson-Whitfield directed and guest-starred in the fourth episode of the season, while recurring cast member Robert Townsend directed the thirteenth episode of the season. Black Lightning creator Tony Isabella attended the season wrap party with the cast and crew on January 5, 2019, and visited the set during the final week of production. Filming for the second season concluded on January 10, 2019.

=== Music ===
Composer Kurt Farquhar returned to score the second season. Salim Akil's son, the rapper Godholly, additionally provided new original music for the season. Tracks by Godholly from the season include "T Whale" and "Survival Mode" from the eighth episode, "In the Streets Again" and "How I Feel" from the ninth episode, and "100 Gang" from the thirteenth episode.

== Release ==
Home media releases for Black Lightning, season 2
Episodes	Originally aired			DVD release date
Episodes	First aired	Last aired	Timeslot (EST)	DVD release date
16	October 9, 2018	March 18, 2019	Tuesday 9:00 pm (1–9); Monday 9:00 pm (10–16)	October 8, 2019

=== Broadcast ===
In May 2018, it was announced that Black Lightning, which served as a mid-season entry for its first season, would instead debut in the fall of the 2018–19 television season for its second. The second season premiered on The CW in the United States on October 9, 2018. In November, it was announced that the series would move to airing on Mondays at 9:00pm following Arrow for the second half of the season after previously airing on Tuesdays at 9:00pm following The Flash since its debut. The 16th and final episode of the season aired on March 18, 2019.

=== Home media ===
Having acquired the international distribution and streaming rights for Black Lightning, Netflix aired new episodes of the season weekly in regions outside of the United States, including Canada, Australia, New Zealand, the United Kingdom, Ireland, most of mainland Europe, and South America. The season was released in its entirety on Netflix in the United States on April 1, 2019, two weeks after the finale aired on The CW.

The complete second season of Black Lightning was made available as a manufacture-on-demand DVD through the Warner Archive Collection on October 8, 2019.

=== Marketing ===
The main cast of the season as well as executive producers Salim Akil and Mara Brock Akil attended San Diego Comic-Con on July 21, 2018, to promote the season. The first trailer of the season was released on September 6. On December 13, The CW released the first promotional image of China Anne McClain as Jennifer Pierce in her official Lightning superhero costume.

== Reception ==
=== Ratings ===
Viewership and ratings per episode of Black Lightning season 2
No.	Title	Air date	Rating/share (18–49)	Viewers (millions)	DVR (18–49)	DVR viewers (millions)	Total (18–49)	Total viewers (millions)
1	"The Book of Consequences: Chapter One: Rise of the Green Light Babies"	October 9, 2018	0.4/2	1.16	0.3	0.92	0.7	2.08
2	"The Book of Consequences: Chapter Two: Black Jesus Blues"	October 16, 2018	0.3/1	1.02	0.3	0.67	0.6	1.69
3	"The Book of Consequences: Chapter Three: Master Lowry"	October 23, 2018	0.4/2	1.18	0.3	0.72	0.7	1.90
4	"The Book of Consequences: Chapter Four: Translucent Freak"	October 30, 2018	0.3/1	0.97	0.3	0.77	0.6	1.74
5	"The Book of Blood: Chapter One"	November 13, 2018	0.3/1	0.90	0.3	0.69	0.6	1.59
6	"The Book of Blood: Chapter Two"	November 20, 2018	0.3/1	0.99	0.3	0.79	0.6	1.78
7	"The Book of Blood: Chapter Three: The Sange"	November 27, 2018	0.3/1	1.06	0.3	0.63	0.6	1.69
8	"The Book of Rebellion: Chapter One: Exodus"	December 4, 2018	0.3/1	0.96	0.3	0.61	0.6	1.57
9	"The Book of Rebellion: Chapter Two: Gift of the Magi"	December 11, 2018	0.4/2	1.13	0.2	0.57	0.6	1.70
10	"The Book of Rebellion: Chapter Three: Angelitos Negros"	January 21, 2019	0.3/1	0.86	0.2	0.58	0.5	1.44
11	"The Book of Secrets: Chapter One: Prodigal Son"	January 28, 2019	0.3/1	0.93	0.2	0.62	0.5	1.54
12	"The Book of Secrets: Chapter Two: Just and Unjust"	February 4, 2019	0.3/1	0.95	0.2	0.57	0.5	1.52
13	"The Book of Secrets: Chapter Three: Pillar of Fire"	February 11, 2019	0.3/1	0.94	0.2	0.57	0.5	1.51
14	"The Book of Secrets: Chapter Four: Original Sin"	March 4, 2019	0.2/1	0.77	0.2	0.52	0.4	1.29
15	"The Book of the Apocalypse: Chapter One: The Alpha"	March 11, 2019	0.2/1	0.75	0.2	0.64	0.4	1.39
16	"The Book of the Apocalypse: Chapter Two: The Omega"	March 18, 2019	0.2/1	0.85	0.3	0.60	0.5	1.45

=== Critical response ===
The second season of Black Lightning received generally positive reviews from professional critics. On the review aggregation website Rotten Tomatoes, the season holds a 91% approval rating, with an average rating of 7.41/10, based on 86 reviews. The website's critic consensus reads: "Faced with the responsibility of aiding Freeland through trying times, the Pierce family takes Black Lightning back by storm."

Writing for The A.V. Club, Kyle Fowle gave the premiere episode an "A−" grade, noting, "One of the reasons the first season was so compelling was that the show made the political personal. That's once again evident here, as there's a wonderful sense of the larger community throughout the premiere." Kayti Burt of Den of Geek! gave the premiere a rating of 3.5 stars out of 5, explaining, "There's a lack of thematic cohesiveness in this season premiere that is probably a result of trying to reintroduce so many characters and storylines at once, but the energy and potential for a strong second season is definitely there. Black Lightning continues to be one of the best, most important shows on television." IGN's Carl Waldron wrote, "Black Lightning himself doesn't see much action in the Season 2 premiere, but the rest of the cast picks up the slack." He gave the episode a rating of 7.5 out of 10 and said that, "Black Lightning continues to be an engaging character-led series." Recapping the premiere for Entertainment Weekly, Christian Holub gave the episode a "B" grade.

In her review for Collider, Allison Keene gave the season's early storylines 4 stars out of 5, writing, "Black Lightning is not without its own flaws, including occasionally disjointed or abrupt storytelling, but its clear desire to educate and inspire through compelling family drama continues to make it a show of consequence." Burt and Syfy Wire contributor Stephanie Williams praised the season for its efforts to de-stigmatize mental health care, especially for black women. Burt called Jennifer's therapy storyline "a powerful, vital representation of mental health issues—not only within the superhero genre, but anywhere on TV." Editorializing for Rotten Tomatoes, Erik Amaya criticized the season's questionable and "imprecise" timeline, as well as Grace Choi's "dispersed" appearances. In regards to the latter critique, Amaya said, "Hopefully, the third season will focus more time on her secret and offer her the opportunity to become more than an occasional guest character." He concluded, "Black Lightning introduced a lot of interesting ideas – even if they are not always served well – and we can't wait to see what becomes of them next year."

Again reviewing for The A.V. Club, Fowle gave the season finale a "C+" grade. He named Jennifer's journey as "undoubtedly" the best part of the season, but felt that the second season as a whole "struggled to reach the heights of its first season" and that "storylines were introduced with full force before petering out, [...] stumbling towards lackluster conclusions." Also reviewing for the finale episode, Burt of Den of Geek! gave the episode a rating of 3 out of 5 stars. She praised Jennifer's character development and Cress Williams' performance, but criticized the season's "tangents" and "unfocused" nature. Dan Ashby of Cultured Vultures gave the whole season a rating of 7.5 out of 10, writing, "Season two of Black Lightning has some interesting storylines, a number of good fight scenes, a catchy soundtrack, and some important messages. Unfortunately, it all seems slightly uncoordinated and messy in its execution." In a more positive account from Entertainment Weekly, Christian Holub gave the season finale a "B" grade, adding, "Season 2's penultimate installment was all over the place, but tonight's season finale did a good job of bringing enough of the threads together that I'm now satisfied to wait for season 3."

=== Awards and nominations ===
Award nominations for Black Lightning, season 2
Year	Award	Category	Recipient	Result	Ref.
2019	NAACP Image Award	Outstanding Guest Performance in a Comedy or Drama Series	Erika Alexander ("The Book of Consequences: Chapter Three: Master Lowery")	Nominated	
2019	Black Reel Award for Television	Outstanding Drama Series	Black Lightning	Nominated	
2019	Black Reel Award for Television	Outstanding Directing, Drama Series	Salim Akil ("The Book of the Apocalypse: Chapter Two: The Omega")	Nominated	
2019	Black Reel Award for Television	Outstanding Guest Actress, Drama Series	Erika Alexander	Nominated	
