= List of Black Lightning characters =

Black Lightning is an American superhero television series developed by Salim Akil, airing on The CW. It is based on the DC Comics character of the same name, created by Jenny Blake Isabella. It stars Cress Williams as the titular character alongside China Anne McClain, Nafessa Williams, Christine Adams, Marvin Jones III, Damon Gupton, James Remar, Chantal Thuy, and Jordan Calloway. Initially set on an unnamed alternative Earth separate from the other Arrowverse media, the show was later merged with Earth-1 (the setting of Arrow, The Flash, Legends of Tomorrow, and Batwoman) and Earth-38 (the setting of Supergirl) into Earth-Prime during Crisis on Infinite Earths.

The series sees the retired Black Lightning (Cress Williams), who as Jefferson Pierce is a high school principal and loving father, return to the hero life after his daughters are kidnapped by the 100 Gang, which is later revealed to be led by Tobias Whale (Marvin Jones III), who apparently killed Jefferson's father years before the onset.

Jefferson's elder daughter Anissa (who is an avid social activist for African-American human rights) later discovers she has inherited her father's metahuman genes, although she is initially unaware that he is Black Lightning and begins investigating her grandfather's articles concerning a group of young metahumans who disappeared years ago. She later discovers her father is Black Lightning and joins him using her powers as a vigilante. Jefferson's ex-wife Lynn Stewart (Christine Adams), is the main inspiration of Jefferson's initial retirement as she feared him dying on the streets, but she begrudgingly realizes she cannot stop him after discovering Anissa's abilities even when Jennifer develops abilities of her own.

== Overview ==
Legend
= Main cast (credited)
= Recurring cast (3+ episodes)
= Guest cast (1–2 episodes)

Black Lightning cast and characters
Actor	Character	Seasons			
Actor	Character	1	2	3	4
Main characters
Cress Williams	Jefferson Pierce / Black Lightning	Main	Main	Main	Main
China Anne McClain	Jennifer Pierce / Lightning	Main	Main	Main	Main
Laura Kariuki (Note: Laura Kariuki replaces McClain as Jennifer Pierce / Lightning starting with "The Book of Ruin: Chapter One: Picking Up the Pieces")	Jennifer Pierce / Lightning				Recurring
Nafessa Williams	Anissa Pierce / Thunder / Blackbird	Main	Main	Main	Main
Christine Adams	Lynn Stewart	Main	Main	Main	Main
Marvin "Krondon" Jones III	Tobias Whale	Main	Main	Main	Main
Damon Gupton	Bill Henderson	Main	Main	Main	
James Remar	Peter Gambi	Main	Main	Main	Main
Jordan Calloway	Khalil Payne / Painkiller	Recurring	Main	Main	Main
Chantal Thuy	Grace Choi / Wylde	Guest	Recurring	Recurring	Main

== Main characters ==
=== Jefferson Pierce / Black Lightning ===
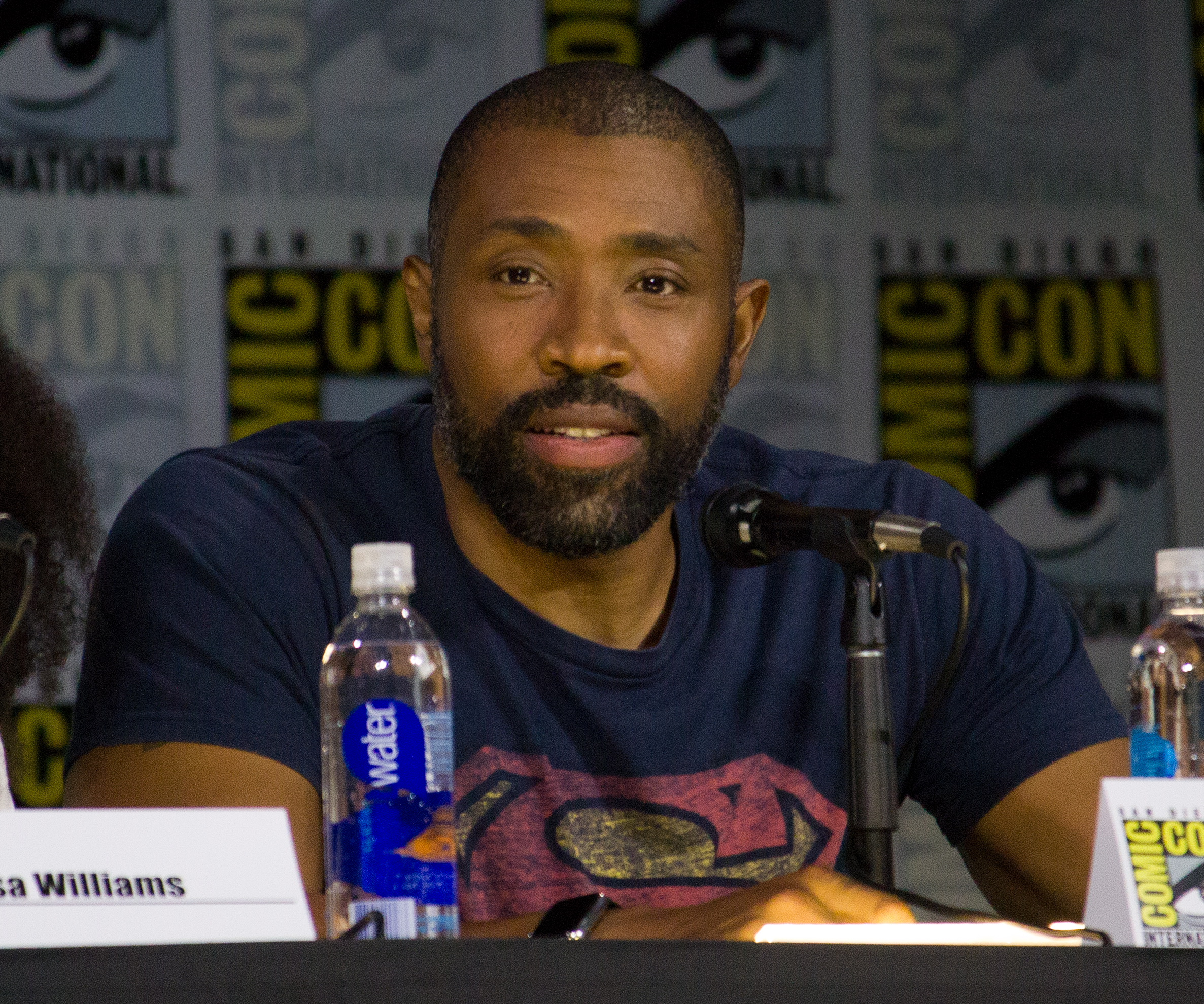
Cress Williams

Jefferson "Jeff" Pierce (portrayed by Cress Williams as an adult; seasons 1–4; Kaden Washington Smith as a child) is the main protagonist of the series.

At the beginning of season one, Jefferson has retired crime-fighting as Black Lightning due to the urges of his ex-wife Lynn and the safety of his two daughters and is the school principal of Garfield High. His foster father, Peter Gambi, urges him to return to the streets and use his metahuman abilities to give hope to the inhabitants of Freeland, their city, which is under duress by the 100 Street Gang. Jefferson adamantly refuses to return and resists using his powers even against a group of racists police officers who pull him and his daughters over unjustified suspicions, but after his daughters Jennifer and Anissa are captured by the 100, he uses his metahuman abilities (which allow him to generate and control electricity offensively) to fight off the gangsters holding them captive as Black Lightning, adorning a new suit built for him by Gambi.

As the series progresses, it revealed that Jefferson's ability to stand up for the community is so effective that he has come to be affectionately known as "Black Jesus" as revealed by his former student LaWanda White. Members of Freeland's community complain to Jefferson about the looming threat of the 100 taking young girls, including LaWanda's own daughter and having them forcibly work for them, but Jefferson continues to resist Black Lightning and promises to help find another way. He speaks to Latavius (who insists to be called "Lala"), one of Jeff's former students and a high-ranking member of the 100 gang, and asks him to back off to no avail, forcing LaWanda to confront Lala only for him to shoot and instantly kill her. Unbeknown to Latavius, she has recorded the event and it is found by the police, who use this as evidence to imprison Latavius. LaWanda's death forms the catalyst to convince Jeff that he is not doing better as Jefferson Pierce but must fully return and act as Black Lightning.

Jeff continues to act as Black Lightning during the night and principal and parent during the day, dealing with the stress of Jennifer's adolescence and Anissa's incessant cry for action against the 100. Gambi helps him by watching through a camera in his glasses and a com and has surveillance watching most parts of the city. It is later revealed that Jefferson's father was a journalist who was killed by Tobias after he wrote an article about him. Jefferson retired shortly after a confrontation with Tobias that left the gangster believing he'd killed Black Lightning, making a name for himself on the streets for the past decade. Upon discovering he is alive, Tobias attempts to have Black Lightning killed while citizens of Freeland pay tribute to his return, but the bullet instead hits Jennifer's boyfriend Khalil, severing his spinal cord and crippling him. After discovering Tobias's resurgence, Jefferson attempts to kill him to avenge his father, but is convinced he's better by Lynn, who reminds him he is a hero and not a murderer shortly before she is attacked by some 100 gangsters for biological research into the drug Green Light. The gangsters are chased off by Anissa, who is revealed to have inherited her father's metahuman genes, has powers and has started to act as a vigilante as well. Upon arrival, Black Lightning fights a masked Anissa, believing her to be the one attacking a gagged and tied-up Lynn. After a heated confrontation, Jefferson knocks Anissa out only to realize who she is. Lynn laments that she is also a metahuman and that she has followed in Jeff's footsteps but the two are forced to accept her need to fight for good just like Black Lightning and Lynn has Gambi make her suit. Jefferson though is displeased with Lynn's apparent hypocrisy and briefly voices his outrage on the matter.

In season three, Agent Odell gives Jefferson a special watch. When this watch is charged to a specific point, Jefferson gains a new costume through nano-technology. This enabled Odell to win Black Lightning into assisting against the Markovian invaders. After returning to Garfield High, he learns from Principal Mike Lowry that the A.S.A. had him reassign Jefferson to the occupation of guidance counselor. Due to the A.S.A.'s oppression, Black Lightning starts to work alongside the rebels.

In part three of Crisis on Infinite Earths, he is recruited by the Flash and his team in an effort to stop an anti-matter wave from annihilating the entire multiverse after he was teleported away while his world was erased. In the final part, Jefferson is restored when his Earth is merged with Earth-1 and Earth-38 to form Earth-Prime. He later become the founding members of a "league of heroes" alongside Barry and several other heroes. Black Lightning returns to Freeland and continues assisting the resistance.

- Williams also portrays Jefferson of Earth-1, who became the Secretary of Education. He secretly helped Reverend Holt with the metahuman underground railroad before he was killed by the A.S.A. This version ceased to exist when Earth-Prime was formed.
- Williams also portrays Jefferson of Earth-2, who was killed by Jinn alongside the rest of his family when they tried to intervene after she ended the Markovian threat. This version ceased to exist when a new Earth-2 was formed.

=== Jennifer Pierce / Lightning ===
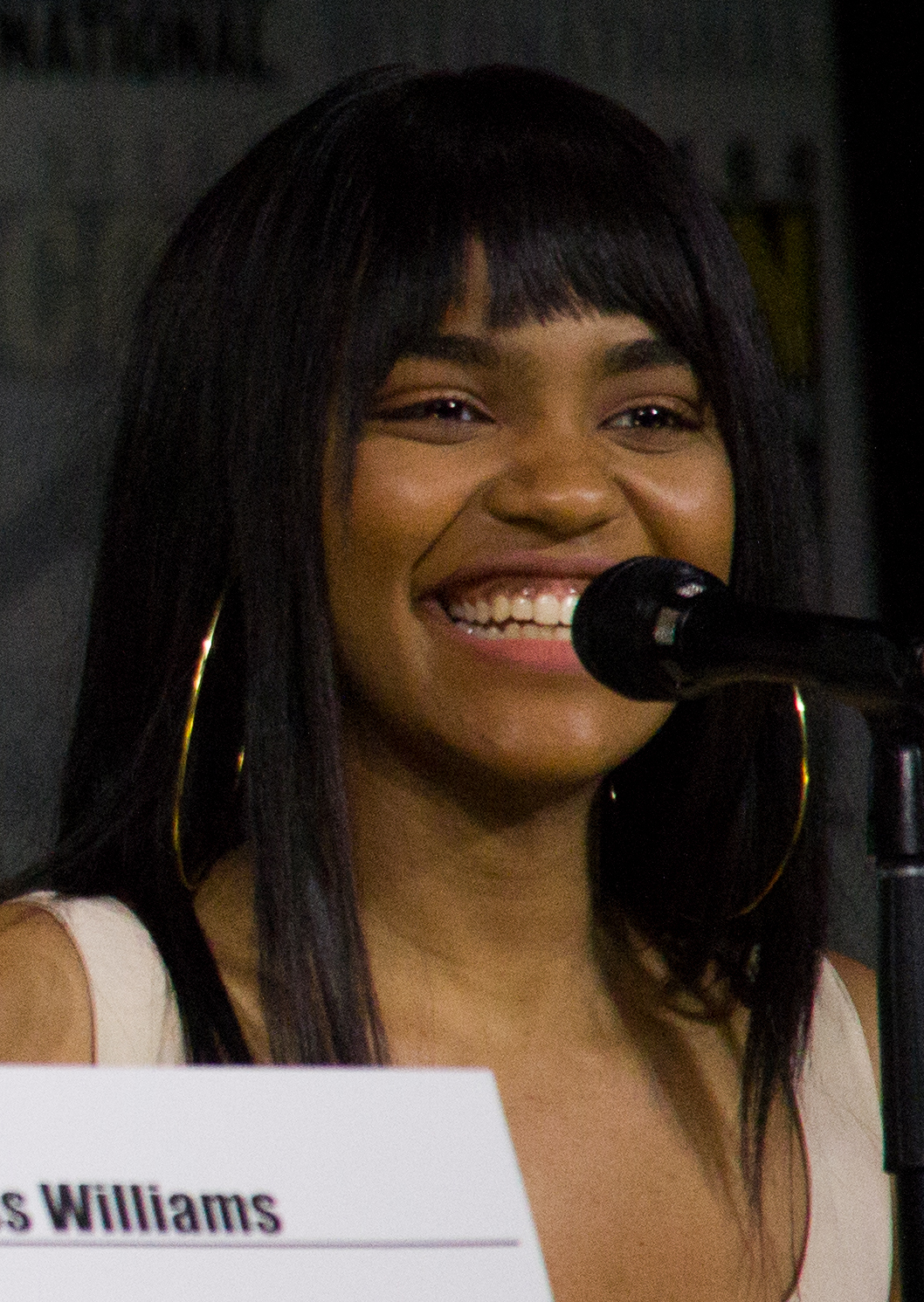
China Anne McClain

Jennifer "Jen" Pierce (portrayed by China Anne McClain as a teenager in season 1 to the first four episodes of season 4 and the series finale, Laura Kariuki for the remainder of season 4, Fallyn Brown as a child) is Jefferson Pierce's younger daughter and a metahuman, like her father and sister.

Jennifer is portrayed as a carefree, rebellious teenager who is prone to challenging the "good girl" appearance imposed on her by her respected father, who is the principal of her high school Garfield High, as well her sister Anissa, who is a teacher at the same school. Initially, Jennifer is very careless and even at times reckless with her own life such in the series premiere when getting drunk in a well-known 100 club and almost being forced to work for them. Jennifer is subsequently rescued by her father, who unbeknownst to her is the crime-fighting vigilante known as Black Lightning. After being kidnapped by the 100 with her sister Anissa, she is rescued by Black Lightning and begins drinking and smoking to mask her fear.

Jefferson extensively taught Jennifer and Anissa martial arts and she is a very skilled hand-to-hand combatant, having once even efficiently broken a girl's wrist. She and her sister Anissa share a very close relationship, although Jennifer often does not support Anissa's more confrontational approach to doing the right thing. Jennifer begins to show maturity after her long-time friend Khalil (who is Garfield High's track star) asks her to be his girlfriend and becomes a stable influence on her life. Jennifer deeply cares for Khalil and after they agree to lose their virginity together, she is responsible enough to inform her parents she will be having sex, although Khalil is shot and crippled before this can happen while marching against the 100's gang violence with Jennifer, ending his ambitions of becoming an Olympic star and transcending the limitations usually imposed on teenagers of color. This puts a strain on their relationship and Khalil lashes out at Jennifer, on an occasion even supporting a girl cyberbullying her. After confronting him on the matter, Khalil reveals he blames her for his new status due to her encouraging him to join him on the march that got him shot, seemingly ending their relationship. Jennifer is currently unaware that she has also inherited her father's metahuman genes and that, like her sister, may one day gain her own abilities, a fact that is presently being kept from her by her sister, mother and father.

After she quits running track, Jennifer becomes an unpaid intern for her mother. Later, an encounter with her friend Kiesha startles Jennifer into awakening her metahuman abilities, which allow her to generate hot red lightning. The next morning, Anissa confesses the truth about her and their father being metahumans and that she is the crime fighting Thunder. As Jennifer initially does not believe her, Anissa uses her super strength to lift Jennifer's bed in a demonstration. Terrified, Jennifer flies and confronts their father, who begrudgingly admits Anissa is telling the truth. This makes Jennifer react angrily as she thinks they have all betrayed her trust as they have lied to her whole life. Later she laments to her mother that she will no longer have a happy and normal life.

After being exposed to the anti-matter in the sky in a lead-up to Crisis on Infinite Earths, Jennifer meets two of her doppelgangers in a void and learns the flaws of having too little power and too much power. As Gambi works to stabilize Jennifer, her body turns into light as the anti-matter wave erases her Earth. Following the Crisis, Jennifer reassembles her body.

In season four, Lightning assists Blackbird in fighting the 100 and the Kobra Cartel during their turf war. During a trip to the ionosphere, Lightning explodes causing Black Lightning to harness the energy particles so that Gambi's machine can put her back together. The process works, but Jennifer's appearance drastically changes. As a result, Jennifer takes up the alias of J.J. Stewart, posing as Jefferson's niece. Jennifer later re-forms in her original body and confronts J.J.; it's revealed that J.J. is actually an entity from the ionosphere who stole her DNA and identity and left her for dead. After a massive fight Jennifer defeats J.J. by absorbing her.

- McClain also portrays Gen of Earth-1, who sided against the A.S.A. and became their prisoner after removing all metahuman abilities in Freeland via the water supply. This version ceased to exist when Earth-Prime was formed.
- McClain also portrays Jinn of Earth-2, who sided with the A.S.A. and ended the Markovian threat before becoming a power-obsessed killer willing to kill her own family. This version ceased to exist when a new Earth-2 was formed.

=== Anissa Pierce / Thunder / Blackbird ===
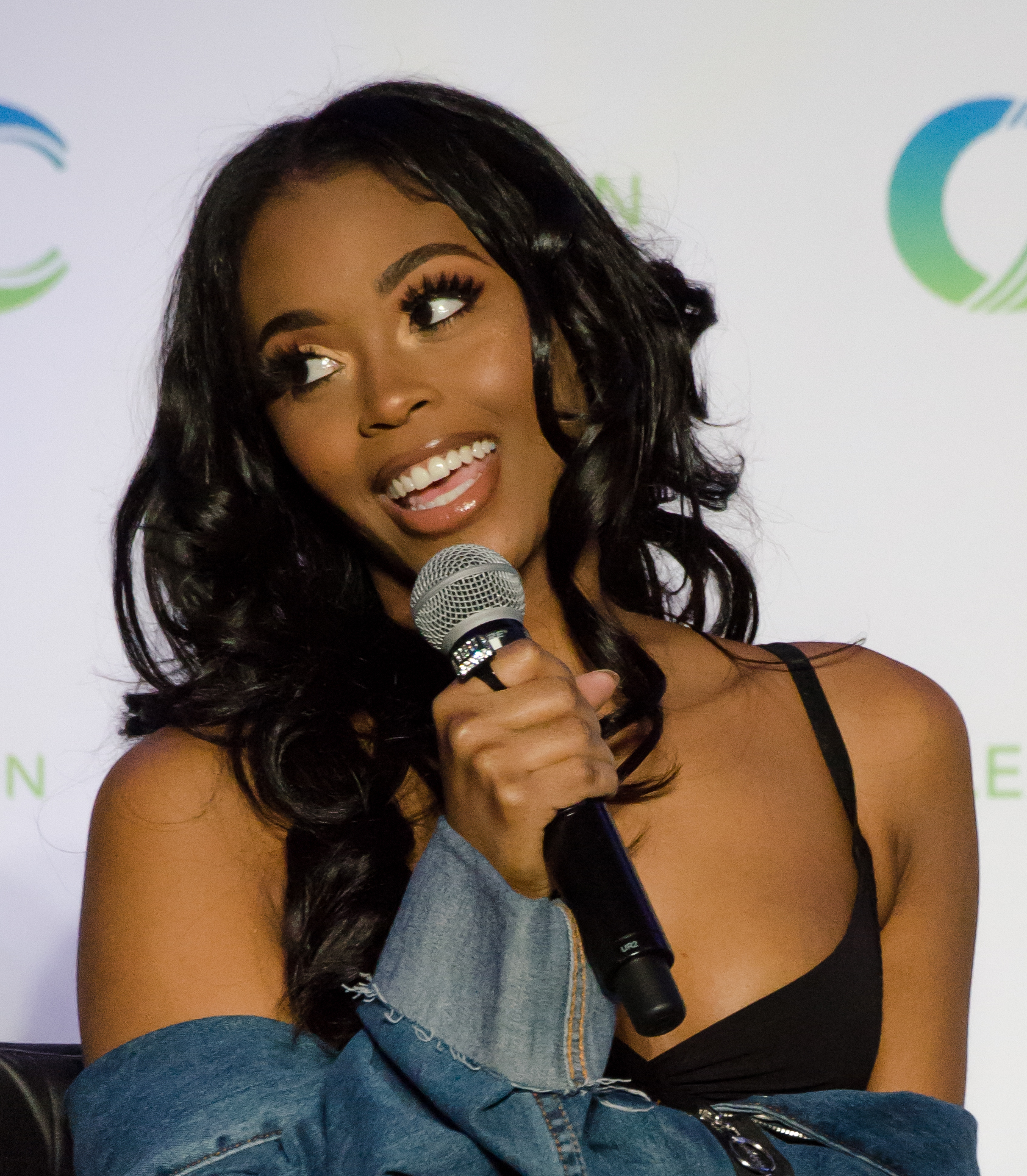
Nafessa Williams

Anissa Pierce (portrayed by Nafessa Williams; seasons 1–4) is the older daughter of Jefferson Pierce and Lynn Stewart and a metahuman like her father and younger sister Jennifer. She is a medical student who works as a part-time teacher at Garfield High.

Anissa is an outspoken young woman who is described as "Harriet Tubman" by her sister Jennifer due to her avid support of the Black Lives Matter movement and Black Rights in general. At the start of the series, she is bailed out of jail by her sister and father due to her joining a protest against the 100 that turns violent. After provoking and publicly attacking Will (a member of the 100 and Lala's nephew) in defense of Jennifer after he got Jennifer into trouble with the gang, Anissa and her sister are kidnapped by Will and small group of gangsters during the class she was teaching. Fortunately, Black Lightning resurfaces and rescues them. Later that night, Anissa begins to undergo a panic attack that awakens her latent metahuman abilities, which give her enhanced strength and density when taking deep breaths that she can activate and deactivate at will by controlling her breathing. This makes her virtually invincible so long as she can continue to control her inhalation. Anissa begins to look into her family history while also making a friend and possible new girlfriend of love interest in bartender Grace Choi and doing vigilante work. Anissa learns that her grandfather was a journalist who investigated a group of young metahumans who disappeared years ago. Anissa eventually finds his research and decides to share it with her mother Lynn Stewart, a neuroscientist, although she does not immediately tell her why she is researching their history. Lynn is attacked by members of the 100 shortly after, who tie her up and tape her mouth shut in her office forcing Anissa to use her powers to help her mother. While she successfully scares them away, Black Lightning shows up, wrongly believing a masked Anissa to be the culprit of a still tied-up Lynn's kidnapping. The two metahumans confront one another, and after Black Lightning inevitably wins and injures Anissa, Lynn reveals the truth and laments that both her children are metahumans.

In season three, Anissa takes on the alias of Blackbird when liberating young metahumans from the A.S.A. buses as Gambi secretly assists her. She later reunited with Grace and accepts her metahuman abilities. Anissa is erased during the Crisis on Infinite Earths when a wave of anti-matter destroys the entire universe. She is restored when her Earth is merged with Earth-1 and Earth-38 to form Earth-Prime.

Describing her character as a positive role model, Williams said "I'm just really grateful to tell the story for young lesbians – and black lesbians in particular ... My hope is that when you watch Anissa, a young lesbian is inspired to walk boldly as who she is and to love herself and to love herself exactly how she looks."

- Williams also portrays her Earth-1 counterpart, who witnessed her father being executed by the A.S.A. for his involvement with the metahuman underground railroad. This version ceased to exist when Earth-Prime was formed.
- Williams also portrays her Earth-2 counterpart, who is killed by Jinn alongside her family when they tried to intervene. This version ceased to exist when a new Earth-2 was formed.

=== Lynn Stewart ===
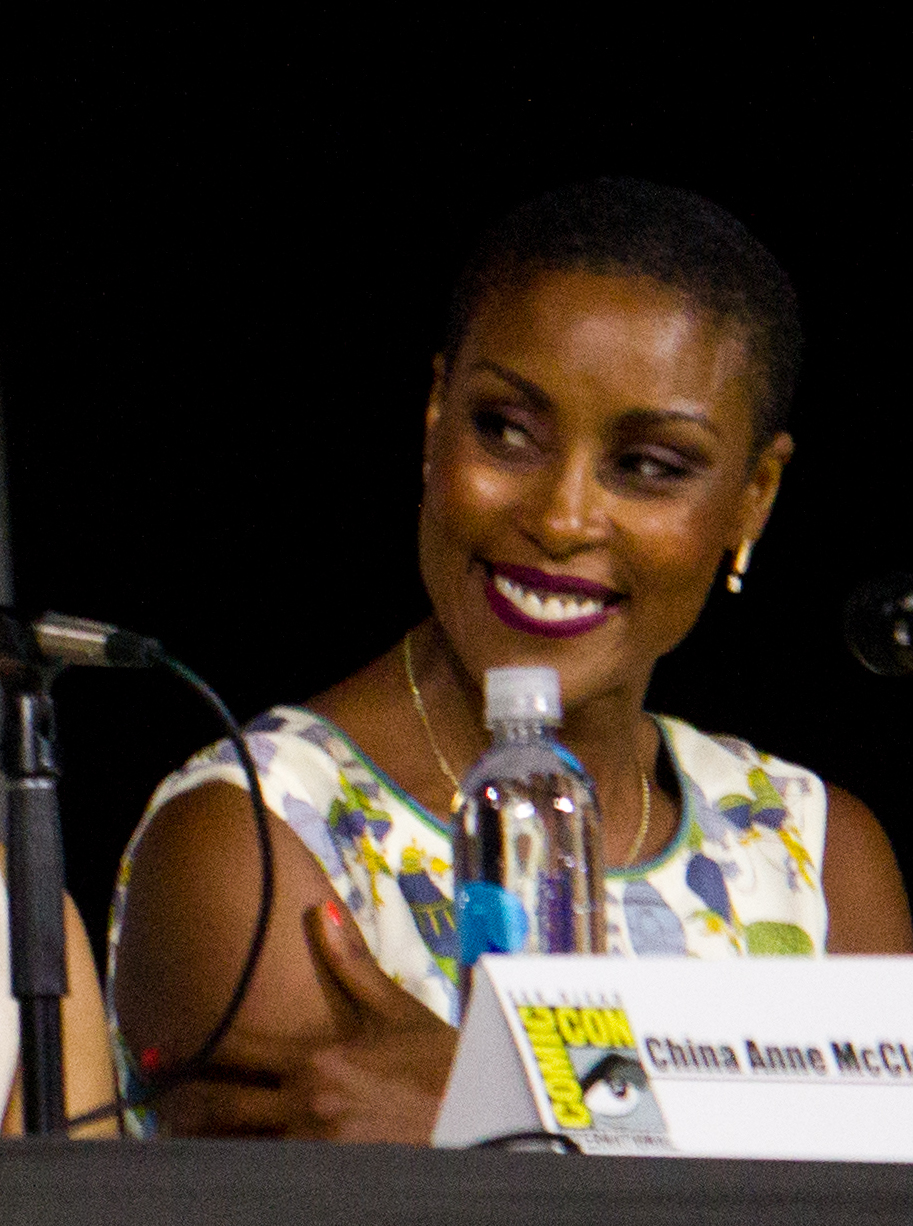
Christine Adams

Lynn Stewart (portrayed by Christine Adams; seasons 1–4) is a highly learned doctor and neurologist as well as the ex-wife of Jefferson and the mother of Jennifer and Anissa Pierce.

Several years before the onset of the series, Lynn divorced and convinced Jefferson to retire as Black Lightning to protect their two daughters as his vigilante work often brought him home battered and wounded; on occasion even bleeding in front of Jennifer. Years later, Lynn and Jefferson begin to get close again, giving Jeff hope of reconciliation before their daughters are kidnapped and he is forced to use his powers for the first time in years to save them, although he promises Lynn that it would be a one-time deal. After the death of his former student LaWanda White, Jeff decides to return to being Black Lightning, much to Lynn's frustration as this pushes back their relationship, which had finally started to heal.

In season three, Lynn starts working for the A.S.A. as she works to find a way to stabilize the metahuman gene. While using a filtered version of Green Light, Lynn was able to come up with the vaccines which also involved some DNA samples taken from Tobias Whale. Whale starts to play with her mind where he wanted the info on the metahumans the A.S.A. had. She gives them to him, but leaves out the information on Wendy Hernandez and Erica Moran. She is erased during the Crisis on Infinite Earths when a wave of antimatter destroys the entire universe. Lynn is restored when her Earth is merged with Earth-1 and Earth-38 to form Earth-Prime.

- Adams also portrays her Earth-1 counterpart, who visits Gen in The Pit after Jefferson was killed by the A.S.A. This version ceased to exist when Earth-Prime was formed.
- Adams also portrays her Earth-2 counterpart, who is killed by Jinn alongside the rest of her family when they tried to intervene. This version ceased to exist when a new Earth-2 was formed.

Black Lightning creator Jenny Blake Isabella stated that when she introduced Lynn, she gave her the surname Stewart "with an eye towards maybe connecting her to John Stewart in the future." In the animated series Young Justice, Lynn Stewart-Pierce is depicted as John Stewart's sister.

=== Tobias Whale ===
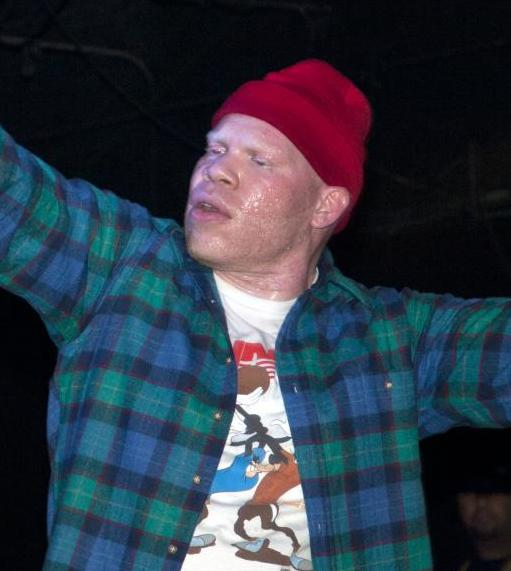
Marvin "Krondon" Jones III

Tobias Whale (portrayed by Marvin "Krondon" Jones III; seasons 1–4) is a crime lord who leads the 100 Gang and the main antagonist of the series.

Tobias is an African-American albino who is portrayed as cruel and seemingly loathes his "Black" heritage as he casually but very often expresses that he prefers the company of "White people" and refers to "Black" individuals distastefully as "negroes". This expressed usually by his left and right-hand man and woman Joey Toledo and Syonide who are always with him. Though this is contradicted by his apparent great love for his sister, Tori. Tobias built his "street cred" around his apparent murder of Black Lightning and was gifted the 100 gang by a group of unseen, powerful underworld gangsters for it. Tobias next attempts to assassinate Black Lightning after he appears before a mob of marchers against the 100. The bullet he fires misses and instead hits Khalil Payne, whose spine is severed. Upon discovering that Tobias is in Freeland, Jefferson attempts to assassinate Tobias in return, but is convinced otherwise and Tobias escapes. Tobias next begins to release a drug called Green Light that seems to temporarily enhance the user's strength while in a blind rage-filled frenzy but is highly unstable. Tobias's sister arrives in Freeland and suggests they turn the people of the city against Black Lightning. Together they decide to finally deal with their father, who was abusive towards them as children. Tobias breaks his back, mercilessly "letting him die" alone with no help. Later, Tobias and Syonide convince Khalil that they have a way to make him walk again. Sometime after this, Tobias and his sister are subsequently attacked by Black Lightning while attending a club. After Lady Eve and Peter Gambi murder Toledo, Tobias and Tori plot to kill Evelyn in revenge. Tobias's people are badly overpowered and he is injured while a stray bullet hits and kills Tori.

In season two, Tobias Whale is arrested by Deputy Chief Henderson and his fellow police officers for the murder of Alvin Pierce. Tobias is released from police custody when District Attorney Montez does not think that Jefferson's eyewitness testimony will stick. Tobias later sends Painkiller to kill Reverend Jeremiah Holt, who wouldn't relocate his clinic as suggested by Councilman Kwame Parker. When Tobias becomes tired of waiting and Painkiller fails to get Reverend Holt to leave town, he placed a bounty on Painkiller, which gets fulfilled by Giselle Cutter and ends with Tobias ripping out his spinal implant and leaving him for dead. When Lightning confronts Tobias Whale after Cutter leaves him, she nearly kills him for what he did to Painkiller until Black Lightning shows up and talks her out of it. Lightning helps her father defeat Tobias who is then remanded to a metahuman prison called the "Pit."

In season four taking place one year later after the Markovian invasion, Tobias starts a campaign to become the new Mayor of Freeland. After getting a device from Marshall Bates and combining it with Val's DNA sample, Tobias starts to negate the Pierce family's metahuman abilities in the device's range. Black Lightning has his final showdown with Tobias Whale which ends with Tobias accidentally falling out the window and getting impaled on a spike. Defiant, Tobias starts shooting at Black Lightning, who is forced to electrocute Tobias to death.

=== Bill Henderson ===
Inspector William "Bill" Henderson (portrayed by Damon Gupton; seasons 1–3) is a police detective and Jefferson's best friend who is oblivious to his alter ego as Black Lightning and hunts him due to believing he is an outlaw and vigilante. After exposing the dirty Deputy Chief Zeke Cayman, he is appointed to replace him.

In season two, Henderson eventually learns that Jefferson is Black Lightning, fracturing their relationship. He later informed Jefferson that Detective Summers was killed and to use Black Lightning to track down one of the people who is known for setting fires to cars. Also, Henderson learned that Jefferson was replaced as principal in light of the 100's attack on Garfield High. Once that was done, Henderson is informed by Black Lightning that the person was hired by Tobias Whale. This leads Henderson and his police officers to track down Tobias Whale at his sister's crypt where Henderson led in his arrest. Then Henderson informed Jefferson that they finally caught Tobias and wanted him to be the first to know about it. While he does place Helga Jace in his custody after Lynn Stewart subdues her, he finds Jace not in her cell due to the bounty hunter Instant having taken her to the Markovians while having killed some police officers in the process. After Tobias is defeated, Henderson is seen driving through the streets as Black Lightning and Thunder put an end to the 100-established riots.

In season three, Henderson is now the chief of police and is intimidated by Commander Carson Williams to do a press conference about the A.S.A.'s enforced curfew or else he will make things miserable for his family. Henderson is forced to agree to the terms. Unbeknownst to the A.S.A., Henderson starts a secret resistance movement against the A.S.A. with the help of Blackbird. During the Markovian invasion of Freeland, Henderson is killed by a Markovian soldier.

=== Peter Gambi ===
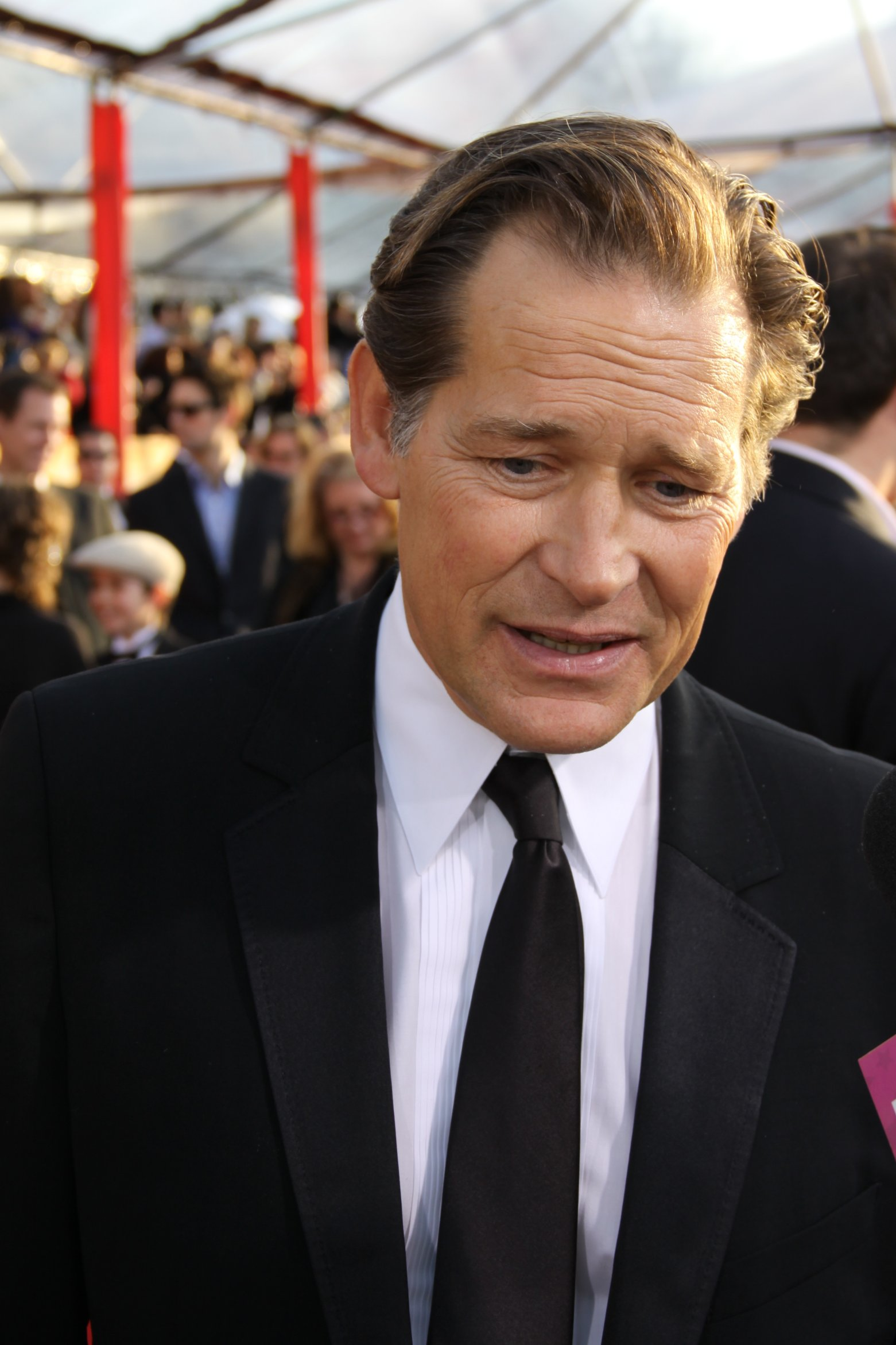
James Remar

Peter Gambi (portrayed by James Remar in normal form, Justin Livingston in cloaked form; seasons 1–4) is a tailor who is the main benefactor and surrogate father of Jefferson Pierce. He took him in after Alvin Pierce's death and is also shown to have some connection with Lady Eve. His real name is Peter Esposito and was a former member of the A.S.A. working under Martin Proctor until he turned against the organization and gave information to Alvin Pierce, resulting in his murder.

In season three, Gambi helps Anissa out with her Blackbird operations, creating the A.I. Shonda for her apartment. To get close to the A.S.A, Gambi uses the holographic cloaking technology to assume the appearance of a random soldier. He is erased during the Crisis on Infinite Earths when a wave of anti-matter destroys the universe. Gambi is restored when his Earth is merged with Earth-1 and Earth-38 to form Earth-Prime. When Black Lightning and Lightning's experiences with alternate realities was brought up, Gambi has no memories of that and had found traces of anti-matter energy explaining that they are the only ones who remember.

=== Khalil Payne / Painkiller ===
Khalil Payne (portrayed by Jordan Calloway; main: seasons 2–4; recurring: season 1) is a track star at Garfield High and Jennifer's ex-boyfriend. After a bullet from Syonide's gun leaves him paraplegic, he becomes involved with Tobias Whale and undergoes an experimental treatment done by the A.S.A. involving a spinal implant that gives him enhanced abilities, turning him into the cyborg Painkiller.

Following Syonide's death, Tobias has Painkiller do her duties as well. After Tobias Whale rips out his spinal implant for being unable to kill Reverend Holt, Painkiller dies from his injuries. In season three, Odell resurrects Painkiller and uses him to kill his own mother with a poisonous touch that the A.S.A. placed in him. With help from T.C. and Gambi, Jennifer creates a firewall to trap the Painkiller program. enabling Khalil to regain control of his body.

=== Grace Choi / Wylde ===
Grace Choi / Shay Li Wylde (portrayed by Chantal Thuy; main: season 4; recurring: seasons 2–3; guest: season 1) Stella Smith in teenager form, Joseph Steven Yang in old man form) is a bartender who becomes Anissa's girlfriend. Later on after a night with Anissa, Grace starts developing spots on her body, which she counters with pills. When Anissa finds one of Grace's pills and she is nowhere to be found, Gambi learns that Grace was an alias used after being rescued from a prostitution ring by ICE

When she reunites with Anissa, Grace reveals that she has shapeshifting abilities that allow her to assume the form of a teenager, an old man, and a leopard. Anissa accepts Grace's metahuman status as they rekindle their relationship. After killing an A.S.A soldier, Grace learns that Jefferson is Black Lightning due to maintaining the scents of people from her leopard form. When the Markovians attack South Freeland, Grace helps Black Lightning and Thunder fight them. Then the two of them have their engagement party to get that out of the way before the Markovians begin their invasion. During the Markovian invasion of Freeland, Grace is mind-controlled by Gravedigger to fight Thunder, who leaves her comatose.

== Recurring characters ==
This is a list of recurring actors and the characters they portrayed in multiple episodes, which were significant roles, sometimes across multiple seasons. The characters are listed by the season in which they first appeared.

=== Overview ===
Character	Portrayed by	Seasons			
Character	Portrayed by	1	2	3	4
Kiesha Henderson	Kyanna Simone Simpson	Recurring	Guest		
Kara Fowdy	Skye P. Marshall	Recurring	Guest		
Latavius "Lala" Johnson / Tattoo Man	William Catlett	Recurring	Guest	Recurring	Recurring
Syonide	Charlbi Dean	Recurring	Guest		
Joey Toledo	Eric Mendenhall	Recurring			
John Webb	Tommy Kane	Guest	Recurring		Guest
Zeke Cayman	Anthony Reynolds	Recurring	Guest		
Jeremiah Holt	Clifton Powell	Guest	Recurring	Recurring	
Evelyn Stillwater-Ferguson / Lady Eve	Jill Scott	Recurring		Recurring	
Nichelle Payne	Yolanda T. Ross	Guest	Recurring	Guest	
Frank "Two-Bits" Tanner	Jason Louder	Guest	Guest	Recurring	Guest
Gina	Vernika Rowe	Guest		Recurring	Guest
Kyrie	Renell Gibbs	Guest		Recurring	Guest
Martin Proctor	Gregg Henry	Recurring			
Agent Odell	Bill Duke		Recurring	Recurring	Guest
Issa Williams	Myles Truitt		Recurring	Guest	
Wendy Hernandez	Madison Bailey		Recurring		
Perenna	Erika Alexander		Recurring		
Helga Jace	Jennifer Riker		Recurring	Recurring	
Mike Lowry	P. J. Byrne		Recurring	Guest	
Giselle Cutter	Kearran Giovanni		Recurring		
Todd Green	RJ Cyler		Recurring		
Jamillah Olson	Adetinpo Thomas			Recurring	
Shonda	Sh'Kia Augustin			Recurring	Guest
Devonte Jones	Rafael Castillo			Recurring	Recurring
Yuri Mosin	Thomas K. Belgry			Recurring	
Brandon Marshall	Jahking Guillory			Recurring	
Sara Grey	Katy M. O'Brian			Recurring	
Michael Allen	Euseph Messiah			Recurring	
Gardner Grayle	Boone Platt			Recurring	
Erica Moran	Gabriella Garcia			Recurring	
Dr. Matthew Blair	Brandon Hirsch			Recurring	
T.C. / Baron	Christopher Ammanuel			Recurring	Recurring
Destiny	Teesha Renee			Guest	Recurring
Gravedigger / Tyson Sykes	Wayne Brady			Recurring	
Lauren Caruso	Elena Varela				Recurring
Hassan Shakur	Wallace Smith				Recurring
Ana Lopez	Melissa De Sousa				Recurring
Dr. Bowlan	Bethann Hardison				Recurring
Red	Matt Roszak				Recurring
Val Seong	Helen Joo Lee				Recurring
Dr. Darius Morgan	Todd Anthony				Recurring
Marshall Bates	Paden Fallis				Recurring
Ishmael	Rico Ball				Recurring
Kevin Mason	Jamal Akakpo				Recurring

=== Introduced in season one ===
==== Kiesha Henderson ====
Kiesha Henderson (portrayed by Kyanna Simone Simpson) is Henderson's daughter and Jennifer's best friend, who encourages Jennifer to challenge her perfect image.

==== Kara Fowdy ====
Kara Fowdy (portrayed by Skye P. Marshall) is Garfield High's vice-principal. She is later revealed to be a spotter for the A.S.A. who reports on metahuman sightings at the school to them. After the A.S.A.'s rogue operation is exposed, Kara leaves the A.S.A. and plans to reclaim the briefcase that was stolen by Tobias Whale. During the heist, Kara is killed by Tobias.

==== Latavius Johnson / Tattoo Man ====
Latavius "Lala" Johnson (portrayed by William Catlett) is a member of the 100 and former student of Jefferson Pierce who is in charge of the Seahorse Motel that the 100 use as a front for their prostitution ring. When Jefferson became Black Lightning and rescued Anissa and Jennifer, Lala escapes and is brought to Tobias Whale by Syonide and Joey Toledo as Tobias wants him dead. After killing his cousin Will for drawing Black Lightning to him, Lala resumes the activity at the Seahorse Motel, only to be defeated by Black Lightning and arrested by Inspector Henderson. When at the police station, Lala is killed by Tobias Whale for his repeated failures to dispose of Black Lightning after he and Syonide were snuck into the police station by Zeke Cayman. Lala is later resurrected by Lady Eve's magic dust and starts seeing Lawanda's ghost and Will's ghost, with their tattoos appearing on his body.

==== Syonide ====
Syonide (portrayed by Charlbi Dean) is Tobias Whale's henchwoman, hit person, and mob enforcer. As an infant, she was found in a dumpster with her umbilical cord wrapped around her. When she was eight years old, Tobias discovered her in an orphanage, where she was abused and malnourished. He took her in and trained her in the art of assassination while also having her put through a painful procedure that involved placing carbon fiber armor beneath her skin. Syonide is later killed in battle against Kara Fowdy.

==== Joey Toledo ====
Joey Toledo (portrayed by Eric Mendenhall) is Tobias Whale's right-hand man and mob enforcer. He is killed by a disguised Gambi who made it look like that Lady Eve called the hit.

==== John Webb ====
John Webb (portrayed by Tommy Kane) is a news reporter for WIXA 7.

==== Zeke Cayman ====
Zeke Cayman (portrayed by Anthony Reynolds) is a corrupt deputy chief of the Freeland Police Department who has connections with the A.S.A and Tobias Whale. He is tasked by Kara with framing Jefferson for drug dealing, but is subsequently arrested by Henderson alongside those involved.

==== Jeremiah Holt ====
Jeremiah Holt (portrayed by Clifton Powell) is a reverend looking to challenge the 100. During a sermon, Holt collapses from a poisoned handkerchief that Cutter secretly placed on him. This enabled her to finish the job that Painkiller was unable to do. However, he was actually placed in a coma due to the "intervention of the Lord" and later leads his people in a prayer during the 100-caused riots.

- Powell also portrays his Earth-1 counterpart, who ran a metahuman underground railroad alongside Jefferson. After he was caught by the A.S.A., he confessed to everything during the subsequent interrogation before they killed him. This version ceased to exist when Earth-Prime was formed.

==== Lady Eve ====
Evelyn Stillwater-Ferguson (portrayed by Jill Scott) is the owner of a funeral parlor who connects Tobias Whale with the Shadow Board, a secret group of corrupt leaders that gave him leadership over the 100. She was also a former agent of the A.S.A. who had connections with Peter Gambi and Agent Odell. Lady Eve is later murdered by Tobias' men as part of a plan to frame Black Lightning and also avenging Joey Toledo when Peter Gambi left the blame of his death on Lady Eve's group. In season three, Lady Eve is resurrected and becomes the head of Ultimate O.

==== Nichelle Payne ====
Nichelle Payne (portrayed by Yolanda T. Ross) is the mother of Khalil. Odell controls Painkiller into killing Nichelle, then covers it up to Lightning by claiming that the Markovians were responsible.

==== Frank "Two-Bits" Tanner ====
Frank "Two-Bits" Tanner (portrayed by Jason Louder) is Jefferson's childhood friend who sells drugs and bootleg DVDs on the streets. He has since become an occasional informant for Black Lightning.

==== Gina ====
Gina (portrayed by Veronika Rowe) is the aunt of Lana. She and her sister visited Jefferson and Lynn for what Jennifer did to Lana. In season three, Gina joins the resistance against the A.S.A.

==== Kyrie ====
Kyrie (portrayed by Renell Gibbs) is a man who later joins the resistance against the A.S.A. In season four, Kyrie is killed by Ishmael when trying to get information from him about Blackbird.

==== Martin Proctor ====
Martin Proctor (portrayed by Gregg Henry) is a member of the A.S.A. who initially wants to kill Black Lightning, but changes his mind when he realizes that his DNA can be used to create metahuman soldiers. During a confrontation at one of the warehouses storing the metahuman stasis pods, Martin is briefly attacked by Jennifer and shot by Gambi.

=== Introduced in season two ===
==== Percy Odell ====
Percy Odell (portrayed by Bill Duke) is an A.S.A. agent from Gotham City investigating the "rogue operation" conducted by Martin Proctor who has connections with Lady Eve and was the one who trained Peter Gambi. He reluctantly allows Lynn to take over management of the Green Light victims. However, Odell becomes suspicious of the Pierce family while planning to weaponize the Green Light victims. After confirming his suspicions and following Tobias Whale's defeat, Odell confronts the Pierce family to tell them that the pods have started to attract the attention of the Markovians. In season three, Odell is shot during an A.S.A. shootout with Yuri Mosin and Instant, with Sara Grey becoming the acting director of operations while he recovers.

- Duke also portrays his Earth-1 counterpart, who imprisoned Gen in the Pit for removing all metahuman abilities in Freeland via the water supply. After getting a confession from a captive Reverend Holt regarding the metahuman underground railroad, he led the A.S.A. to the Pierce home to confront Jefferson and execute him. This version ceased to exist when Earth-Prime was formed.
- Duke also portrays his Earth-2 counterpart, who gladly supported Jinn ending the Markovian threat in Freeland. This version ceased to exist when a new Earth-2 was formed.

==== Issa Williams ====
Issa Williams (portrayed by Myles Truitt) is a Green Light metahuman whose glowing jugular causes anyone he sees to tell the truth. The Pierce family takes him in after his mother rejects him, but he leaves with some family members after learning that he has only months left to live.

In season three, Issa is in A.S.A. custody, where it is claimed by Odell that the Markovians abducted him and the A.S.A. rescued him. It was revealed during Issa's truth-extraction interrogation on Tobias Whale that Proctor worked for Odell.

==== Wendy Hernandez ====
Wendy Hernandez (portrayed by Madison Bailey) is an aerokinetic metahuman previously obtained by the A.S.A. who is loosely based on Windfall. She is accidentally released from her stasis pod. Wendy suffers a psychotic break upon release and goes on a rampage, stopping only when Black Lightning shocks her. Afterwards, she chooses to go back into her pod until Lynn can find a cure.

==== Perenna ====
Perenna (portrayed by Erika Alexander) is a psychic metahuman and one of Gambi's former A.S.A. contacts who steps in to help Jennifer control her powers.

==== Helga Jace ====
Dr. Helga Jace (portrayed by Jennifer Riker) is a convicted mad scientist from Markovia and old acquaintance of Tobias Whale who is roped into helping Lynn and the A.S.A. treat the metahumans. After being re-incarcerated, Jace joins Yuri Mosin's Markovian army. After Instant leaves upon Mosin wiring the money to his account, Jace states that Lynn has found a way to stabilize the meta-gene as they will obtain the information so that they can stabilize the metahumans on the Markovians' side. While Brandon Marshall is assisting Black Lightning in rescuing Lightning from the Markovians, Commander Williams breaks into Brandon's apartment and kills Jace as a way to remove classified information.

==== Mike Lowry ====
Mike Lowry (portrayed by P. J. Byrne) is a man who becomes the new principal at Garfield High with the aim of reversing what he sees as Jefferson's ineffective policies on school safety. He starts his "Zero Tolerance" policy on Sekou Hamilton and another student that were fighting where Sekou was expelled for throwing the first punch and the other student was suspended much to the dismay of Jefferson. Lowry's later argument with Jennifer about Khalil's mural goes viral as Jefferson persuades Dr. Frank to give Lowry a second chance to implement his plan.

==== Giselle Cutter ====
Giselle Cutter (portrayed by Kearran Giovanni) is a British mercenary with poison-tipped blades who is hired by Tobias Whale to bring Painkiller to him alive.

==== Todd Green ====
Todd Green (portrayed by RJ Cyler) is a man who lost his research grant to a white wards board and is swayed to Tobias Whale's side by wiring $100,000.00 to Green's account. After cracking the code in the briefcase, Green and Tobias discover that the A.S.A. is developing metahumans for Project Masters of Disaster. In addition, he orchestrates the secret jailbreak of Helga Jace. Tobias Whale later has Cutter kill Green, believing that he has served his purpose.

=== Introduced in season three ===
==== Jamillah Olson ====
Jamillah Olson (portrayed by Adetinpo Thomas) is a reporter for Clap Back. During the Markovian invasion of Freeland, Olson is shot by a Markovian soldier.

==== Shonda ====
Shonda (voiced by Sh'Kia Augustin) is the AI in Anissa's apartment who was created by Gambi.

==== Devonte Jones ====
Devonte Jones (portrayed by Rafael Castillo) is a man who was briefly in A.S.A. custody for being a suspected metahuman. After he was released, he sides with Lala and helps to investigate the Ultimate O business run by Lady Eve.

==== Yuri Mosin ====
Yuri Mosin (portrayed by Thomas K. Belgry) is a Markovian colonel and old enemy of Agent Odell who leads the attack on Freeland. He and Instant later sneak into Freeland to steal some A.S.A. information. Due to an ambush led by Agent Odell, Yuri Mosin and Instant start a shootout which leads to Odell getting wounded. Before Mosin can finish off Odell, Black Lightning shows up causing Instant to teleport Mosin away. Lynn later mind-controls Mosin to shock himself until he passes out. Gravedigger thanks Mosin for his services to Markovia and uses his upgraded powers to kill him.

==== Brandon Marshall ====
Brandon Marshall (portrayed by Jahking Guillory) is a new student at Garfield High. As A.S.A. soldiers are attacking Jefferson Pierce, Jennifer discovers that Brandon is a metahuman who can manipulate the properties of earth. Brandon revealed to Jennifer that he came to Markovia to look for Helga Jace, who was responsible for killing his mother. Because his mother died when he was young, Brandon had been in several foster homes. Jennifer brings Brandon to Jace to get information on Brandon's mother, whose ashes he kept in crystallized form. Brandon throws the crystallized ash into Jace's left shoulder and leaves with Jennifer.

==== Sara Grey ====
Sara Grey (portrayed by Katy O'Brian) is an A.S.A. commando under the rank of major who works with Agent Odell to enforce the curfew in Freeland and obtain any suspected metahumans. She is among the commandos rescued from the Markovians by Black Lightning. During the Markovian invasion of Freeland, Grey is instructed by Odell to find the briefcase or destroy it. After a meeting with Lady Eve which resulted in a shootout, Grey is killed by T.C.

==== Michael Allen ====
Michael Allen (portrayed by Euseph Messiah) is an A.S.A. nurse who assists Lynn with working on Tobias Whale. He is later revealed to be a double agent working for the Markovians upon Lynn's capture. When in Markovia, Allen continues to extract bone marrow samples from Tobias.

==== Gardner Grayle ====
Gardner Grayle (portrayed by Boone Platt) is an A.S.A. sergeant. He assisted Sara Grey in pulling suspected metahumans out of houses. When the Pit was going under lockdown, Grayle allows Lynn to get by him. As Jennifer engages Specialist Travis, Grayle knockshim out enabling Jennifer and Brandon to escape. After helping Lynn sneak Tobias Whale out of the Pit, they are tasered by a Markovian operative. During the Markovian invasion of Freeland, Grayle and Erica assist in the evacuation of the suspected metahumans. When they and the rebels try to fight Gravedigger, he just mind-controls them to sleep.

==== Erica Moran ====
Erica Moran (portrayed by Gabriella Garcia) is a kinetic energy-absorbing metahuman in the A.S.A.'s custody. When Lynn is abducted by the Markovians, Erica is chipped by the A.S.A. to assist in the raid on Markovia. Major Grey has Dr. Blair place a contingency for Erica to kill Lynn in the event that Lynn cannot be saved. However, the chip is secretly deactivated by T.C. when he gets close to Erica. Erica assists in the raid on the Markovian facility and is later returned to her family.

==== Matthew Blair ====
Dr. Matthew Blair (portrayed by Brandon Hirsch) is a young scientist who assists Lynn in her work with the metahumans in A.S.A. custody. After Lynn flees, Dr. Blair is left to work on the vaccine, where he has only been able to reach 60%. Blair is later abducted by Lala and tortured by Devonte on where Tobias Whale is, which he has no knowledge of.

==== T.C. / Baron ====
T.C. (portrayed by Christopher Ammanuel) is a technopathic Green Light metahuman who was kept in a stasis pod by the A.S.A. After being freed from his pod, T.C. moves to an old radio station, where he meets and befriends Peter Gambi.

While helping Jennifer to adjust to her new body, T.C. is among those that find out that Val Seong has power-negating abilities when Lynn tests a meta-booster on Gambi. During a transmission with Khalil and Philky, T.C. works on helping to subdue Painkiller while mentioning his suspicion that Tobias Whale framed Jefferson for embezzlement. Following the death of Tobias Whale, T.C. helps Khalil get rid of his kill code.

==== Destiny ====
Destiny (portrayed by Teesha Renee) is a worker at the Ultimate O who works for Lady Eve.

In season four, Destiny becomes the underboss for the Kobra Cartel. Following the death of Mayor Billy Black, Destiny contacts Lala for a truce stating that the police will come after the Kobra Cartel once they are done with the 100. After witnessing Lala revive upon being shot and the arrest of the 100 members present, Destiny calls up someone stating that they need to find an assassin who specializes in metahumans. This leads to her calling in Ishmael, who successfully stabs Lala and traps his body in cement. Destiny later learns that Ishmael is planning to kill 100 metahumans in order to get into the League of Assassins. As Ishmael already killed 94 metahumans, Destiny contracts him to kill Black Lightning and his allies.

==== Gravedigger / Tyson Sykes ====
Tyson Sykes (portrayed by Wayne Brady) is a World War II soldier and half-brother of Jefferson Pierce's grandfather Ben who became a subject to a metahuman project collaboration between the United States and Markovia in exchange for not being court martialed for beating up a group of racist soldiers. Tyson was the only survivor of this project. While he possesses super-strength, super-speed, and mind-control, Gravedigger maintained his age due to the same serum that Helga Jace used on Tobias Whale. He used his talents when fighting Nazi soldiers. After the war, Gravedigger sided with Markovia, assisted in a coup d'état, and became one of the Markovian's few stable metahumans. Years later, Gravedigger was sent by his superiors to take over the operation from Mosin.

=== Introduced in season four ===
==== Lauren Caruso ====
Lauren Caruso (portrayed by Elena Varela) is an employee at Monovista International and the ex-girlfriend of Gambi. During Gambi's early work with the A.S.A., Caruso turns down his offer to join with them. After meeting up with Gambi years later, Caruso and the rest of Monovista International start to work on the DEGs.

==== Hassan Shakur ====
Hassan Shakur (portrayed by Wallace Smith) is a detective in the Freeland Police Department. Following the death of Mayor Billy Black, Lopez makes Shakur the head of the Meta Task Force.

==== Ana Lopez ====
Ana Lopez (portrayed by Melissa De Sousa) is the new chief of police of the Freeland Police Department. Following the death of Mayor Billy Black, Lopez starts the Meta Task Force while appointing Hassan Shakur as its leader. Consumed by her desires to defeat Lightning, Lopez uses the meta-booster that Tobias Whale gave her to gain electrokinesis.

==== Dr. Bowlan ====
Dr. Bowlan (portrayed by Bethann Hardison) is a therapist that Jefferson and Lynn see.

==== Red ====
Red (portrayed by Matt Roszak) is a man with magnetic abilities who becomes Tobias Whale's latest minion. He killed Mayor Billy Black with a special bullet, which is later found by Hassan. Tobias later dispatched Red to find out from Marshall Bates on why a specific item has been delayed. Upon being informed that the device still needs to be fully tested, Red informs Bates to have that test finished up and en route to Tobias in 48 hours or else one of his bullets will go into his head. Red was unaware that the footage of the discussion was being watched by Jefferson and Gambi.

==== Val Seong ====
Val Seong (portrayed by Helen Joo Lee) is Tobias Whale's lawyer who has ALS and a meta-gene that grants her power-negating abilities.

==== Dr. Darius Morgan ====
Dr. Darius Morgan (portrayed by Todd Anthony) is a doctor who becomes Anissa's co-worker. He is also revealed to be an ordained minister where he weds Anissa and Grace. When Anissa later goes to his apartment to learn the information about the metahuman cure from him, she finds Morgan dead in his apartment.

==== Marshall Bates ====
Marshall Bates (portrayed by Paden Fallis) is an executive at Monovista International.

==== Ishmael ====
Ishmael (portrayed by Rico Ball) is an assassin who is hired by Destiny to deal with Lala. After killing him and trapping his body in a cement casket, Ishmael states to Destiny that he is planning to kill 100 metahumans in order to get into the League of Assassins. As he had already killed 94 metahumans, Ishmael is further contracted by Destiny to go after Black Lightning and his allies. After finding out what Painkiller did to Jesse Gentilucci, Tobias Whale sends Ishmael to take out Painkiller and Looker. Painkiller manages to kill Ishmael by getting his poison onto the hilt of Ishmael's sword.

==== Kevin Mason ====
Kevin Mason (portrayed by Jamal Akakpo) is a special agent for the FBI who investigates Jefferson for embezzlement. After having Lynn's work confiscated, Mason arrests Lynn for violation of civil rights. It was discovered that Mason was being controlled by Looker after the information was found with her involvement with Tobias was discovered. With help from Detective Shakur, Jefferson slips a chemical that Lynn made into the coffees for the interrogation, which causes the silver liquid to be ejected from Mason.

== Guest stars ==
=== Introduced in season one ===
- Varetta Henderson (portrayed by Karen Ceesay) – The wife of Inspector Henderson and the mother of Kiesha Henderson.
- Will (portrayed by Dabier Snell) – A member of the 100 and cousin of Lala who kidnaps Anissa and Jennifer. He is later killed by Lala for disappointing him and later appears as a ghost that only Lala can see.
- Lawanda White (portrayed by Tracey Bonner) – One of Jefferson's former students whose daughter was taken by the 100 under Lala's supervision. After Jefferson fails to help her as promised, Lawanda confronts Lala, who shoots and kills her. Unknown to him, she recorded the entire exchange, which leads to his arrest at the hands of Inspector Henderson and eventual death. Lawanda later turns up as a ghost that only Lala can see.
- Tori Whale (portrayed by Edwina Findley) – Tobias Whale's younger sister who assists in his plot to destroy Black Lightning. She is accidentally killed by a stray bullet while trying to escape from Black Lightning.
- Eldridge Whale (portrayed by T. C. Carson) – The torturous father of Tobias and Tori. After being found by Tori, Tobias repays their father by breaking his spine and leaving him for dead.
- David Poe (portrayed by Antonio Fargas) – The editor-in-chief of the Freeland Gazette who gives Anissa files that once belonged to her grandfather Alvin. He is subsequently killed offscreen in a staged hit-and-run.
- Mr. Nasir (portrayed by Jigga) - A teacher at Garfield High.
- Chandler Tong (portrayed by Regina Chen) - A news anchor for WIXA 7 who reports on the activities in Freeland.
- Gordon (portrayed by Vanessa Aranegui) - A math teacher at Garfield High.
- Glennon (portrayed by Faron Salisbury) - A detective in the Freeland Police Department who was bribed by the A.S.A. through Kara Fowdy into doing their bidding like assisting Deputy Chief Cayman in planting evidence that Jefferson Pierce had Green Light. After Henderson finds proof that the bribe that Glennon took was used to pay for a new house for his son, Glennon cooperates with Henderson, which leads to the arrest of Caymen and those involved.
- Steven Connors (portrayed by Joshua Mikel) – A drug supplier and an associate of Lala. He later allies with Tobias following attacks from Thunder.
- Thomas Hildago (portrayed by Morgan Brown) – A weapon maker who is allied with the A.S.A. After being interrogated by Gambi, Thomas is killed by Lala.
- Alvin Pierce (portrayed by Keith Arthur Bolden) – The father of Jefferson and friend of Peter Gambi who worked as a reporter. He was killed by Tobias Whale after exposing him for corruption. Jefferson once conversed with him following a near-death experience when Tobias Whale raided Garfield High. In season four, Jefferson visits Henderson's grave and converses with his father's ghost.
- Josh Henry portrays an unnamed scientist working for the A.S.A. who oversees the stasis pods that the captured metahumans in Proctor's possession are in.
- Detective Sergeant King (portrayed by Crystal Lee Brown) – A member of the Freeland Police Department who is initially a desk sergeant and later becomes a detective sergeant. In season 3, King is revealed to have taken Green Light and is killed by a virus that targets metahumans.
- Tavon Singley (portrayed by Jasun Jabbar Wardlaw Jr.) – A student at Garfield High. In season three, Tavon is killed during an ambush on Blackbird by Painkiller.

Roland S. Martin and Nina Turner appeared as themselves in the pilot. Journalist Amanda Davis has a posthumous cameo appearance in two episodes.

=== Introduced in season two ===
- Dr. Napier Frank (portrayed by Robert Townsend) – An old friend of Jefferson Pierce who is on Freeland's board of education.
- Marcel Payton (portrayed by Kedrick Brown) – A teacher at Garfield High. In season four, Payton is revealed to have been left homeless since the Markovian invasion. After Lydell Green of the 100 accidentally kills his son, Payton's other children are taken by child services and he is briefly forced to resign. Payton later informs Jefferson that Tobias got him a new house.
- Sekou Hamilton (portrayed by Christian Alex Jones) – A student at Garfield High.
- Zoe B. (portrayed by Andy Allo) – A musician who Anissa befriends.
- Montez (portrayed by Salli Richardson-Whitfield) – The district attorney of Freeland.
- Anaya (portrayed by Birgundi Baker) – A pregnant girl who Anissa attends to at the clinic. Due to her romance with Deacon, she gives birth to twins with one being black and one being white. In season 3, Anaya allows safe passage for the suspected metahumans through their territory.
- Deacon (portrayed by Rob Morean) – The boyfriend of Anaya. He later dies in front of Anissa, emiting a metal-like substance. It was later revealed that Deacon was part of South Freeland's Sange community.
- Looker (portrayed by Sofia Vassilieva) – A metahuman with the ability to control people with a metal-like substance she emits. She is the ruler of South Freeland's Sange community.
- Sheriff Clark (portrayed by Robert Walker Branchaud) – The sheriff of South Freeland.
- Kwame Parker (portrayed by Eric Lynch) – A Freeland councilman and benefactor of Martin Proctor who is swayed to Tobias Whale's side. When Tobias Whale unleashes Heatstroke into Freeland, Parker is killed by Heatstroke.
- Thierry (portrayed by Warren "WAWA" Snipe) – The deaf father of Anaya and member of South Freeland's Perdi community.
- Batina (portrayed by Charmin Lee) – The mother of Anaya and member of South Freeland's Perdi community who interprets for her husband Thierry. She is killed in battle with the Sange.
- Kito Payne (portrayed by Kendrick Cross) – The father of Khalil and husband of Nichelle who is an ex-criminal.
- Instant (portrayed by Tosin Morohunfola) – A teleporting metahuman and bounty hunter. After killing some people in a bar, Instant is contacted by an unknown client to head to Freeland, where he retrieves Helga Jace.
- Masters of Disaster – A group of metahumans created by the A.S.A. as part of the experiments of "Project Masters of Disaster."
  - Marcus Bishop / Shakedown (portrayed by Hosea Chanchez) – A secret A.S.A. operative who can generate vibrations and frequencies at will.
  - Joe / Heatstroke (portrayed by Esteban Cueto) – A metahuman with pyrokinetic abilities.
  - Daryl Robinson / Coldsnap (portrayed by Derrick Lewis) – A metahuman with cryokinetic abilities.
  - Rebecca Jones / New Wave (portrayed by Brooke Ence) – A metahuman with hydrokinetic abilities who is the leader of the Masters of Disaster.
- Lazarus Prime (portrayed by Michael Wright) – A mysterious man and old friend of Lady Eve who puts Lala back together and revives him. He supports Lala's revenge plans on Tobias Whale for what he did to Lady Eve. It was revealed that he was also known by Agent Odell.

Benjamin Crump and Angela Rye appears as themselves in the season two premiere talking about the Green Light incident.

=== Introduced in season three ===
- Maryum Luqman (portrayed by Zoe Renee) – A Muslim metahuman with camouflage abilities. The side effect of her powers caused damage to her hair, nails, and eyes.
- Carson Williams (portrayed by Christopher B. Duncan) – An A.S.A. Meta Force soldier under the rank of commander and metahuman who can replicate the abilities of metahumans via contact. When Williams attempts to kill Lynn, she briefly copies Erica's powers and kills Williams in self-defense.
- Cyclotronic / Ned Creegan (portrayed by Chase Alexander) – A metahuman who can disintegrate anything at will and was part of the same program that gave Carson Williams his powers according to Gambi's research. Cyclotronic attacks the A.S.A. facility that Anissa and Reverend Holt were given a tour of, only to be killed by Carson Williams.
- Rebecca Larson (portrayed by Amanda Baker) - The host of the news show Larson Line.
- Sinzell Johnson (portrayed by Mac Wells) – A gangster who exploits the remnants of the 100 until he is driven away from Lala.
- Herbert King (portrayed by Antwan Mills) – The husband of Detective Sergeant King.
- Mary Louise Shepard (portrayed by Andrea Frye) – An old lady living at Franklin Terrace who was formerly a third-grade teacher of Jefferson and Henderson.
- Travis (portrayed by Garrett Hines) – An A.S.A. commando under the rank of specialist.
- Representative Nagar (portrayed by Jennifer Christa Palmer) – The head of a Congressional committee which exposes the A.S.A.'s experiments as well as Markovia's own experiments.
- Judge Isabella (portrayed by Jenny Blake Isabella) – A judge on the Congressional committee.
- Judge Von Eeden (portrayed by Trevor Von Eeden) – A judge on the Congressional committee.

=== Introduced in season four ===
- Billy Black (portrayed by Reggie Hayes) - The Mayor of Freeland. Black is secretly killed by Red in retaliation for Black declining to have Garfield High torn down.
- Lydell Green (portrayed by Kelvin Hair) - A member of the 100 who was responsible for accidentally killing Marcel Payton's son during a shootout with the Kobra Cartel. Lala later kills Lydell who manifests on Lala's right hand as a tattoo.
- Terry Andrews (portrayed by Tre' Stokes) - A young man who filmed Lightning fighting the 100 and the Kobra Cartel which Rebecca Larson uses in her slandering of metahumans. When Lightning fights Terry with T.C.'s help, he asks for a selfie which she does and also leads to Lightning to start a social media page, which Terry follows.
- Behemoth (portrayed by Nicholas Pulos) - A cage fighter who takes parts in Lala's illegal cage fights.
- Wesley Robinson (portrayed by Troy Faruk) - The deputy chief of the Freeland Police Department. He is secretly allied with the 100.
- Philky (portrayed by Alexander Hodge) - A remnant of the A.S.A. who allies with Khalil and uses his part in Akashic Valley as a front for Khalil's activities.
- Donald (portrayed by James Roch) - A former Marines medic who allies with Khalil.
- Maya Odell (portrayed by Sibongile Mlambo) - The daughter of Percy Odell who operates in Akashic Valley.
- Uriah (portrayed by McKalin Hand) - A new student at Garfield High who befriends Jennifer in her J.J. alias.
- Jesse Gentilucci (portrayed by Kenneth Trujillo) - A gangster who is associated with Tobias Whale. Khalil visits Gentilucci's club in need of specific information before killing him.
- Keith Michaels (portrayed by Will Blagrove) - A lawyer and Lynn's ex-boyfriend who Anissa enlists to defend Lynn when she was arrested for violation of civil rights.

Fantastic Negrito cameos as a hologram version of himself in Philky's bar.
