= Sh'Kia Augustin =

American actress

Sh’Kia Augustin
- Born: Sh’Kia Shonaye Dennis; Oakland, Florida, U.S.
- Education: Florida Atlantic University
- Occupations: Actress; Screenwriter; Producer; Author
- Years active: 2015–present
- Known for: Kold x Windy
- Spouse: Daniel Augustin (2018–present)

Sh'Kia Augustin also known mononymously as Sh’Kia, is an American actress, writer and singer from Oakland, Florida best known for playing the role of Malika ‘Kold’ Wise in the musical drama Kold x Windy.

== Career ==
Sh'Kia appeared alongside Donald Glover and Zazie Beetz in the final season of Atlanta: The Most Atlanta.

She is also known as the voice of Shonda in the TV series Black Lightning.

== See also ==
- List of Black Lightning characters
