= Tattooed Man =

Three fictional characters

Publication information
- Publisher: DC Comics
- First appearance: Abel Tarrant: Green Lantern (vol. 2) #23 (September 1963); John Oakes: Skin Graft: The Adventures of a Tattooed Man #1 (July 1993); Mark Richards: Green Lantern (vol. 4) #9 (2006); Lala Johnson: Black Lightning Season 1×1 (January 2018)
- Created by: Gardner Fox and Gil Kane

In-story information
- Alter ego: Abel Tarrant; John Oakes; Mark Richards; Lala Johnson
- Species: Metahuman
- Team affiliations: Abel Tarrant; Injustice Gang of the World; The Society; Suicide Squad; Mark Richards; The Society; Justice League; Titans
- Abilities: Living tattoos

The Tattooed Man is the name of three characters appearing in media published by DC Comics, primarily as an enemy of Green Lantern.

An original version of the Tattooed Man, Latavius "Lala" Johnson, appeared as a recurring character in the Arrowverse television series Black Lightning, portrayed by William Catlett.

== Publication history ==
The first Tattooed Man first appeared in Green Lantern (vol. 2) #23 (September 1963) and was created by Gardner Fox and Gil Kane.

== Fictional character biography ==
=== Abel Tarrant ===
Abel Tarrant is a sailor based in Coast City who turned to burglary. During one of his heists, he is exposed to chemicals, which leaves him with the ability to create physical objects using them. Tarrant tattoos himself using the chemicals so he will always have access to their powers.

Tattooed Man originally has an advantage against Green Lantern because the chemicals' base was yellow, though the tattoos themselves were usually shown as purple. Green Lantern eventually beats Tattooed Man by making him concentrate on more than one of his tattoos.

Tattooed Man later returns as a member of the Injustice Gang. He has tattooed much of his body, including his face. Tarrant is apparently murdered by Goldface's mafia for trying to con them. Years later, he would resurface, reform, and become a tattoo artist, involuntarily being forced to battle Guy Gardner.

He resurfaced as a member of the Suicide Squad saying that despite his attempted reform, he could not escape his past and was upset the new Tattooed Man had been accepted into the Society.

=== John Oakes ===
The second Tattooed Man is John Oakes, the main character of the Vertigo series Skin Graft: The Adventures of a Tattooed Man by Jerry Prosser and Warren Pleece. Oakes first appeared in Skin Graft #1 (July 1993).

Oakes is a cellmate of Abel Tarrant, from whom he learned the art of tattoo - with a supernatural edge. After being released from jail, Oakes learns that his tattoos are able to open arcane "doors" and involuntarily trap people as "tattoos" on his body. Further studying for the Irezumi master Kobo in Kyoto, Oakes learns to control his abilities, and defeats both Tarrant and the "tattoo killer" Mizoguchi Kenji by absorbing them. However, Oakes' beloved Yuko dies in the battle as well, which prompts him to absorb her to make her part of his own self.

=== Mark Richards ===
Mark Richards is a former U.S. Marine who went missing following a helicopter crash and was presumed dead until he showed up in Gotham City as a hit man. He claims that the tattoos covering his body are the sins of men he had killed and that he utilizes "sin-grafting" to absorb the sins of others.

In Infinite Crisis, Tattooed Man joins the Secret Society of Super Villains.

In Trinity, reality is altered by the removal of Superman, Batman, and Wonder Woman. In this world, Morgaine Le Fay's recruits, the Dreambound, recruit Richards to replace one of their fallen number. He becomes Sun-Chained-In-Ink and gains the ability to control the powers of the sun: heat, light, and gravity. As the series progresses, Richards comes to dislike the Dreambound, deeming them "losers". Reality is eventually returned to normal and the original Sun-Chained-In-Ink is resurrected, removing Richards' new powers.

In Final Crisis, Tattooed Man and his family are seen hiding in an abandoned school from Darkseid's Justifiers. His wife sends out a signal to be rescued by the surviving heroes. Black Lightning shows up to save them and, before being captured, asks Tattooed Man to deliver "The Circuit" to the Hall of Justice. While his family is taken to a Checkmate Watchtower, he joins up with the survivors in the Hall of Justice. Tattooed Man resolves to never again take his powers for granted, prompting Black Canary to make him an honorary member of the Justice League.

In DC's Brightest Day event, Tattooed Man appears as a member of Deathstroke's new team of Titans. Deathstroke offers to help him track down Slipknot, who was responsible for murdering his son. Deathstroke allows Tattooed Man and Slipknot to fight to the death, with Tattooed Man winning and killing Slipknot. After this act, Tattooed Man quits Deathstroke's team, declaring that he is done with killing.

Tattooed Man later rejoins Deathstroke's Titans. Deathstroke reveals to them that he has created a machine called the "Methuselah Device", intended to heal his dying son Jericho. After healing Jericho, Deathstroke declares that the machine can also resurrect the dead, including Tattooed Man' son. Tattooed Man initially accepts but after Cinder declares the Methuselah Device a curse, he joins her and Arsenal in fighting the other Titans to destroy it.

During the Heroes in Crisis storyline, Tattooed Man is shown as a patient at Sanctuary. He was among those killed by Savitar after he escapes from the Speed Force, which is blamed on Wally West losing control of it. In The Flash #796, it is revealed that the hero Gold Beetle replaced all of the dead heroes with clones from the 31st century, allowing them to survive.

== Powers and abilities ==
Each of the Tattooed Man versions can bring their tattoos to life.

== Collected editions ==
- Final Crisis: Submit one-shot
- Crisis Aftermath: Ink (collects Crisis Aftermath: Ink #1-6)
- Titans: Villains for Hire (collects Titans (vol. 2) #24-27 and Titans: Villains for Hire Special #1)

== Other versions ==
In the alternate timeline of the Flashpoint event, Tattooed Man is a member of Deathstroke's pirates before being killed during an ambush by Aquaman and Ocean Master.

== Similar characters ==
- A woman named "Tattoo" appeared in the comic book Aztek as part of a Lex Luthor-funded group named "Dial V for Villain". She displayed powers similar to Abel Tarrant's.
- A non-powered thug named "Tattoo" appears as member of the False Face Society.
- A young girl named "Pix" appeared in Batman: Gotham Knights. Her powers were virtually identical to those of the Tattooed Man, but her powers were nanotechnological in origin rather than chemical exposure. Ariadne Pixnit is an avant-garde artist who used nanobots in paints to program them to form what she wanted. After being beaten and raped by a gang of street thugs, Pinxit disguised herself as a tattoo shop worker, designing lethal tattoos that she brings to "life" via computer to kill all the gang members.
- During the New 52, a woman named "Tats" battles Power Girl.

== In other media ==
=== Television ===
- The Abel Tarrant incarnation of Tattooed Man makes non-speaking cameo appearances in Justice League Unlimited as a member of Gorilla Grodd's Secret Society.
- The Mark Richards incarnation of Tattooed Man appears in the Batman: The Brave and the Bold episode "Scorn of the Star Sapphire!", voiced by Michael Jai White.
- An original incarnation of Tattooed Man named Latavius "Lala" Johnson / Tattoo Man appears in Black Lightning, portrayed by William Catlett. This version is a former student of the titular character and a member of the 100 under Tobias Whale. After repeatedly failing to kill Black Lightning, Whale kills Lala and reanimates him with help from Lady Eve, who provides Whale the means to control Lala. As a side effect, the latter sees the ghosts of those he killed, whose faces are forcibly tattooed onto him. Whale later uses Lala as a bomb mule in a failed attempt at killing A.S.A. agent Martin Proctor, though Lala is resurrected once more in the second season with help from Lazarus Prime, a coroner with a grudge against Whale. Lala tries to seek revenge on Whale, but is forced to serve him once more when Whale uses his tattoos to incapacitate him. In the third season, Lala gains control of the 100's remnants and mounts another revenge attempt on Whale, only to fall under Lady Eve's control. As of the fourth season, Lala has assumed leadership of the 100.

=== Film ===
- The Abel Tarrant incarnation of Tattooed Man was reportedly featured in David S. Goyer's script for an unproduced Green Arrow film project titled Escape from Super Max.
- The Flashpoint incarnation of Tattooed Man makes a cameo appearance in Justice League: The Flashpoint Paradox.
- A character loosely inspired by Tattooed Man called Monster T appears in Suicide Squad, portrayed by Common. This version is a henchman of the Joker, who kills him after Monster T makes covetous comments about Harley Quinn.

=== Video games ===
The Abel Tarrant incarnation of Tattooed Man appears as a character summon in Scribblenauts Unmasked: A DC Comics Adventure.

=== Miscellaneous ===
- The Abel Tarrant incarnation of Tattooed Man appears in issue #4 of the Green Lantern: The Animated Series tie-in comic. This version's tattoos were created from radioactive ink.
- The Mark Richards incarnation of Tattooed Man appears in DC Super Hero Girls as a background student of Super Hero High.
