= Young Justice: Outsiders =

- Season 3
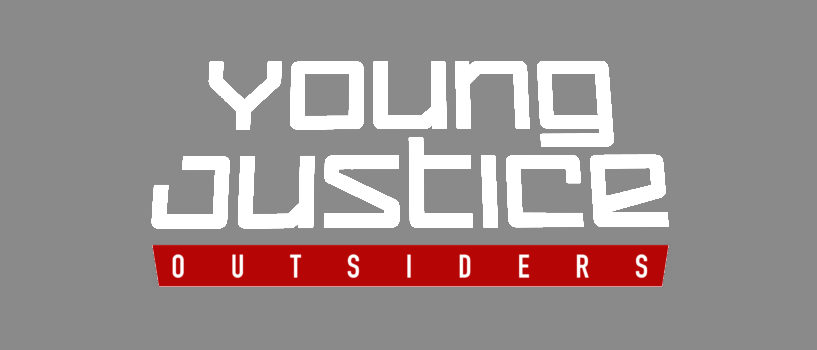
- Starring: Jesse McCartney; Khary Payton; Jason Spisak; Zehra Fazal; Troy Baker; Greg Cipes; Zeno Robinson; Tara Strong
- No. of episodes: 26

Release
- Original network: DC Universe
- Original release: Part 1: January 4, 2019 – January 25, 2019; Part 2: July 2, 2019 – August 27, 2019

Season chronology
- ← Previous; Invasion Next → Phantoms

Young Justice: Outsiders is the third season of the American animated superhero series Young Justice, developed by Brandon Vietti and Greg Weisman. The series follows the lives of teenage superheroes and sidekicks who are members of a covert operation group, referred to simply as "The Team", that acts as a young counterpart to the famous adult team, the Justice League. In the second season, Invasion, the Reach revealed the existence of the meta-gene. Following on from these events, the third season focuses on the Team battling metahuman trafficking. It also features the superhero team Outsiders.

Young Justice originally aired on Cartoon Network for two seasons from 2010 to 2013, before being cancelled due to low toy sales and Mattel pulling funding. Following a strong fan campaign and high viewership ratings on Netflix, the series was officially renewed for a third season by Warner Bros. in November 2016. Development on Outsiders began the next month. By July 2017, it was split into two separate sections/arcs, each consisting of 13 episodes, making a total of 26 for the whole season.

The first half of the season was released between January 4 and 25, 2019, on DC's new digital platform, DC Universe, for a total of 13 episodes. The second half of the season, consisting of the remaining 13 episodes, premiered on July 2, 2019. During the Young Justice portion of the DC Universe panel at the 2019 San Diego Comic-Con, Weisman and Vietti announced that production for the fourth season titled Phantoms is already underway to continue the story after Outsiders. The fourth season premiered on HBO Max on October 16, 2021.

== Episodes ==
The first letter of each episode spells out a hidden phrase: "Prepare the Anti-Life Equation".

No. overall	No. in season	Title	Directed by	Written by	Original release date	Prod. code
Part 1
47	1	"Princes All"	Christopher Berkeley	Greg Weisman	January 4, 2019	301
Two years after the Reach's defeat, metahuman trafficking has reached galactic levels, but the Justice League is unable to intercede due to United Nations Secretary General Lex Luthor hindering their efforts. Recognizing the restrictions, Batman, Green Arrow, their respective protégés on the Team, and other Justice Leaguers resign in a pre-planned move to operate as vigilantes again. Black Lightning also resigns to recover from an incident where he accidentally killed a metahuman child. Days later, King Viktor and Queen Ilona of Markovia announce their plans to combat metahuman trafficking, but are assassinated by the metahuman Jaculi. Markovia is placed under martial law with Ilona's power-mad brother, Baron Fredric DeLamb, serving as regent until the eldest son, Gregor, turns 18. His fraternal twin brother, Brion, wants to form a team that can continue his late parents' mission and learns from royal physician Helga Jace that he tested positive for the meta-gene. Nightwing and Oracle learn that the traffickers' labs are using a tar-like substance from Markovia and recruit Superboy and Tigress to help infiltrate the country. Dick also asks Jefferson to join, but he is hesitant due to his guilt and fluctuating abilities. Despite these, he ultimately agrees to join.
48	2	"Royal We"	Mel Zwyer	Andrew Robinson	January 4, 2019	302
The Justice League announces the resignation of several members in response to the United Nations' restrictions. Baron DeLamb declares that vigilante heroes are unwelcome in Markovia, just as Dick's team arrives in the country to investigate the metahuman trafficking syndicate, "Bedlam". Nightwing and Tigress go undercover at the King's pre-coronation party while Superboy and Black Lightning go underground to find the labs. Prince Brion is at odds with his brother over their uncle becoming regent and plans to activate his meta-gene to save his country with the help of geneticist Simon Ecks. Superboy and Black Lightning find the captive meta-children, but are attacked by Count Vertigo and Plasmus. Despite sustaining injuries, Black Lightning escapes while Superboy is captured. Ecks shows the metahuman trafficking lab to Brion before Vertigo knocks him out and has him thrown into a pod. Vertigo leaves to report back to his superior, leaving Jace to arrive and activate Brion's pod. Meanwhile, Tigress rescues a Quraci metahuman who was nearly buried by thugs before her powers brought her back to life with no memory of what happened to her.
49	3	"Eminent Threat"	Christopher Berkeley	Brandon Vietti	January 4, 2019	303
Tigress and Black Lightning head to the hospital to rescue Superboy, with some assistance from the girl Tigress saved, nicknamed "Halo". Dick discovers that Helga Jace activated Brion's meta-gene to oppose Bedlam's leader, Baron DeLamb. While DeLamb is able to kidnap the trafficked children, Dick's team saves Jace and Brion, who starts experiencing his geo-thermokinetic powers. DeLamb, having taken security footage from the lab, tries to frame Brion for his crimes; leading the latter to violently and publicly attack the former, revealing DeLamb as a metahuman. Superboy defeats DeLamb as Gregor sees through his uncle's lies and has the traitor arrested. However, he is forced to banish Brion from Markovia because of what metahuman affairs have wrought on their family; though he asks Superboy to take care of him in his place. Black Lightning's powers return after witnessing Plasmus kill Halo, but her passive healing factor allows her to survive. Black Lightning frees Plasmus from Bedlam's control, but a frightened bystander shoots and kills him. Superboy and Brion regroup with Nightwing and the others to plan their next move.
50	4	"Private Security"	Vinton Hueck	Michael Vogel	January 11, 2019	304
While Halo, Brion, and Helga Jace settle into America, Dick recruits Will, Roy, and Jim Harper for a mission tracking down more metahuman traffickers in exchange for helping Will with a gig at his private security company. The four are assigned to protect a shipment of high tech VR goggles that is soon hijacked by Brick and his thugs. While Dick and the Harpers try to retrieve the shipment, Will gives Dick advice on starting a new team to protect the metahuman kids. Elsewhere, during a yearly reunion between Zatanna and Zatara, Artemis tries to connect with Halo; in the process learning from Fate that an "old soul" is inhabiting her body. Back in Happy Harbor, Conner gives Brion pointers on adjusting to non-royal life.
51	5	"Away Mission"	Mel Zwyer	Nicole Dubuc	January 11, 2019	305
Dick gathers his new team together in Happy Harbor to evaluate Brion and Halo to decide how to best help them. They start training them in using their powers and agree to help Brion find his missing sister, Tara. Meanwhile, M'gann and the Team are recruited to investigate an incident on New Genesis, where someone impersonating Orion has been attacking the Bug hives. M'gann discovers that the Orion impersonator is her younger brother, M'comm (now calling himself Ma'alefa'ak), who is trying to get the Bugs to attack the New Gods. M'gann stops him, but a young Bug named Forager, who requested the Team's help, is banished from the hive. M'gann offers him asylum on Earth.
52	6	"Rescue Op"	Vinton Hueck	Joshua Hale Fialkov	January 11, 2019	306
When an assassination bears signs of potentially involving Tara, Brion recruits Halo and Forager to go to Infinity Island with him to confront the League of Shadows and find her. Upon arriving on the island, they encounter Sensei, who quickly defeats them. Fortunately, Dick and the others soon arrive to rescue them. Sensei and several assassins try to foil their escape, but Ra's al Ghul arrives and allows them to depart. Brion demands his sister's safe return, but Ra's reveals that the Shadows are no longer on Infinity Island or under his control since he's no longer part of the Light. As they depart, a young ninja with Ra's seems to recognize Dick, which pleases him. On the way home, Artemis and Dick reveal that Barbara has discovered Halo's real identity: Gabrielle Daou, a Quraci refugee who was working at the Markovian palace. Halo, experiencing a memory of being mistreated by the Markovians, denies this and proclaims her name is "Violet"; a name Brion had given her after seeing her violet healing aura.
53	7	"Evolution"	Christopher Berkeley	Brandon Vietti	January 18, 2019	307
Cassandra, the daughter of Vandal Savage, reads a diary recounting his history. It details how Savage became immortal, his first encounter with Darkseid, and his first time defeating Starro. In the present, an alien armada threatens Earth, forcing Savage to confront them with Warworld. He soon learns that the armada is being controlled by Starro and goes to face his ancient foe. Meanwhile, in Happy Harbor, Dick, Artemis, and Conner train and bond with Brion, Violet and Forager; giving them their supersuits and codenames. Violet chooses Halo, the name Artemis gave her when they first met. Brion christens himself Geo-Force, after the name Helga Jace gave his family's power. Forager stays with his own name. Halo also discovers a new power, a green aura that creates holograms, when it duplicates her physical self. Note: This episode was dedicated to Miguel Ferrer, the original voice of Vandal Savage, who died in 2017.
54	8	"Triptych"	Mel Zwyer	Peter David	January 18, 2019	308
This episode presents three stories told by Nightwing, Robin, and Kaldur'ahm (now the new Aquaman after Arthur decided to be King of Atlantis full-time). First, Dick recounts to Barbara how his team confronted Cheshire, Shade, Mist, and Livewire for information regarding the League of Shadows. Cheshire claims they are currently operating out of Santa Prisca before escaping with Shade. Second, Tim reports to Batman that he, Spoiler, Arrowette, and Orphan were tracking Clayface disguised as Jervis Tetch. Though they catch up to him, the real Mad Hatter escapes with a young man he was experimenting on. Third, Kaldur reports to Wonder Woman about a prison transport, wherein Sportsmaster escaped with a metahuman prisoner. All three stories are revealed to be connected, as all of the heroes were working together with Batman. They inform Diana that Sportsmaster released Shade, so Tetch could implant him with his mind control tech before turning him over to Cheshire. All of this was part of a metahuman trafficking ring run by Simon Stagg, who is arrested. Wonder Woman criticizes the others for their covert actions, fearing that they may be crossing the line.
55	9	"Home Fires"	Vinton Heuck	Greg Weisman	January 18, 2019	309
Nightwing's team comes under attack when Lobo arrives on Earth under a contract to kill Forager. The team rushes to his defense, but despite all of their best efforts, the bounty hunter appears to succeed and pound Forager to death. However, after he departs, Forager reveals what Lobo destroyed was his exoskeleton, having shed it to fool the bounty hunter. Meanwhile, in Central City, Iris West hosts a play date for all the children of all the heroes who have families, accompanied by their parents. Unbeknownst to her, Ocean Master has leased the house across the street to observe them, with a plan of eliminating the next generation of heroes out of revenge, but he is stopped and killed by Lady Shiva: as the Light's enforcer, she did this because the actions of his plan are what the Light refer to as a 'Nuclear Option'. Enacting it would result in unforeseen consequences, therefore they are currently unwilling to go forward with it. In the end, the Light is revealed to have also been behind Lobo's attack on Forager to confirm that Nightwing has assembled a new covert team of heroes, which the villains see as a potential threat to their operations. However, Granny Goodness informs them that Apokolips has a plan in place to deal with them.
56	10	"Exceptional Human Beings"	Christopher Berkeley	Francisco Paredes	January 25, 2019	310
Batman, Katana, and Metamorpho go on a covert mission to Santa Prisca to investigate the Shadows and Tara's whereabouts. There, they learn the Shadows are currently being led by Deathstroke and trained by Lady Shiva. It is also revealed that Cassandra Savage has joined their ranks and Tara was sent to Granny Goodness. Batman and the others are discovered and engage Bane, Deathstroke, and Shiva, but manage to escape. In Star City, Artemis enrolls Violet in high school and Will has a conversation with a lurking Cheshire, who states she only came to say goodbye and that Will should move on. Elsewhere, Victor Stone tries to convince his father, Silas Stone, to come to his football game, where he is scouted by several major universities, but his father fails to show.
57	11	"Another Freak"	Mel Zwyer	Mae Catt	January 25, 2019	311
At S.T.A.R. Labs, Victor gets into an argument with his father and accidentally causes an explosion. Silas uses a Father Box given to him by the Justice League to try and save his son, but it encases Victor in a technological cocoon and transforms him into a cyborg. Elsewhere, Violet and Forager, wearing a glamour charm and going by the name "Fred Bugg", start at Happy Harbor High and become friends with Harper Row. Violet begins experiencing uncomfortable sensations and soon discovers a new indigo aura, which allows her to open boom tubes. She transports herself to Detroit and discovers Victor in the midst of a destructive rampage due to the Father Box, the source of her sensations. She and Victor fight before she uses her violet aura to cleanse him of the alien tech's influence and transport them both back to Happy Harbor. Meanwhile, Dick meets with Brion to update him on Tara, as he grows more impatient and demands immediate action. After letting him blow off steam, Dick has a heart to heart with him, telling him to let go of his past and move on.
58	12	"Nightmare Monkeys"	Vinton Heuck	Greg Weisman	January 25, 2019	312
Garfield prepares for a date with Queen Perdita, only to find himself trapped within his own mind after trying on a pair of Goode Goggles that rendered him unconscious. He experiences traumatizing visions about his mother's death, his adoption by the Doom Patrol before their subsequent deaths, and members of the Team who had died (such as Wally West) before his godmother's husband took custody of him and he became a TV star. During each of his visions, he sees his childhood pet monkey, who eventually reveals that he is actually a monkey god who had chosen Gar to be his avatar. When M'gann finally revives him, Gar reveals that his boss (Granny Goodness) is using the Goode Goggles for sinister purposes and he decides to rejoin the Team. Back in Happy Harbor, Victor meets the Outsiders and reveals the tech in his body came from a Father Box. Upon hearing this, Sphere attacks him and the Father Box programming reasserts itself until Violet cleanses him again. It is also revealed that Violet has the soul of a Mother Box, which is the source of her powers.
59	13	"True Heroes"	Christopher Berkeley	Kevin Hopps	January 25, 2019	313
Nightwing's team goes on a covert mission to Greater Bialya to raid a metahuman trafficking depot, now known to be run by Granny Goodness and where Tara is being held. Upon arriving, they discover the depot to be a metahuman fight club and auction. They manage to sneak the fifteen-year-old Princess Tara out (now going by "Terra"), but go back to rescue the other metahuman kids. Meanwhile, back in Happy Harbor, Violet struggles to adjust to her new emotions. When the Father Box once again takes control of Victor, she is unable to defend herself due to her heightened emotional state because of her affections for Brion. She soon decides however, that her human emotions make her stronger and she cleanses Victor of the Father Box once and for all. Brion introduces Tara to the others as Dick tells Artemis that Brion, Violet, Forager, and Tara might be ready to join the Team. The next morning, Tara secretly sends a text to Deathstroke, telling him, "I'm in".
Part 2
60	14	"Influence"	Mel Zwyer	Brandon Vietti	July 2, 2019	314
After stopping a purse snatcher, Beast Boy decides to rejoin the Team, via his off-hours since he cannot quit working for Goode World Studios. Tara, Geo-Force, Halo, and Forager join the Team. Meanwhile, Granny Goodness goes public, blaming her Goode Goggles tracking metahumans on her dead designer. G. Gordon Godfrey further discredits the League with Lex Luthor's help. In space, Parademons have been stealing rare metals from different planets. Superman, Wonder Woman, Hawkman, Hawkwoman, and Guy Gardner follow an ion trail to an asteroid base built by Big Barda and the Female Furies, who had left the ion trail on purpose to fight them. Barda is punished by Granny for doing this without her authorization, just as the League breaks in and find a large device built from the stolen materials. Granny and DeSaad test the device, causing the heroes and the Furies agony until escape. Ditching the League in space, the New Gods teleport their base to safety.
61	15	"Leverage"	Vinton Heuck	Thomas Pugsley	July 2, 2019	315
Brion, Tara, Violet, and Forager (along with Beast Boy and led by Artemis) are assigned their first Team mission; to investigate the rumors concerning a Russian government metahuman program which, as they soon discover, aims to use military volunteers to create an equivalent to the Justice League called the Rocket Red Brigade. While leaving, the heroes discover Monsieur Mallah, Captain Boomerang, and Black Manta about to attack the Russian base. They intercept the attack and engage the three criminals. The commotion causes two Rocket Reds to join the fight. After the criminals are defeated, Artemis convinces the Russians to let her team leave and take the villains back to Belle Reve. There, it is revealed that the three supervillains were part of a newly-created government team called Task Force X, run by Amanda Waller. Meanwhile, in Taos, New Mexico, the metahumans at the MHYC undergo orientation and their first session on learning to control their powers. One of them, Wendy Jones, takes the name Windfall and confidently starts using her powers, but is unable to control them. After Ed Dorado Jr. teleports her outside, she opts to wear a collar that inhibits her powers.
62	16	"Illusion of Control"	Christopher Berkeley	Greg Weisman	July 2, 2019	316
Brion, Tara, Violet, Jefferson, and Helga Jace celebrate Thanksgiving with Will, Lian, Artemis, and Paula. When Paula learns Artemis returned to being a hero, she bitterly encourages her to instead focus on being a mother figure to Lian as Jade is not coming back. Meanwhile, Victor avoids having dinner with Conner, M'gann, Lucas Carr, and Forager. Forager encourages him to join them as they all care about him; using a butterfly metaphor to tell him he needs to "come out of his shell". Elsewhere in Taos, the Team visits the MHYC to join the festivities, along with Garfield and Queen Perdita. However, Vertigo kidnaps his own niece. After they rescue her, they discover it was Psimon in disguise and that it was a ruse to leave the center unprotected. Preventing Onslaught from capturing metahumans, Garfield takes the spotlight with other heroes to encourage hope and belief in metahuman youths.
63	17	"First Impression"	Mel Zwyer	Brandon Vietti	July 9, 2019	317
Garfield decides that the League cannot succeed in winning back the public's trust as Lex Luthor has restricted them too much and politics have put any action by the League on hold. To rectify this, he forms the Outsiders alongside Kid Flash, Static, Wonder Girl, Blue Beetle, and Geo-Force; using his home in Hollywood as their new base. The Outsiders discover Reach battle bugs attacking a town and take them down with little property damage. Despite their heroics, the mayor demands their arrest until the main ship arrives on autopilot and threatens to fall on the town when the air force arrive. However, the Outsiders manage to safely crash the ship outside of town and the sheriff tells off the mayor, letting them go via a loophole in the law. Beast Boy's message, "we are all outsiders", starts trending online with the help of the Newsgirl Legion.
64	18	"Early Warning"	Vinton Heuck	Greg Weisman	July 16, 2019	318
While the Outsiders' popularity is on the rise, they're sent to investigate a magical disturbance in Cuba, where Klarion uses his magic to activate the metagene in kidnapped teenagers. Unsatisfied with any of the results, he merges them into a giant monster. Zatanna secretly backs up the Outsiders by restoring the victims to their bodies, then traps Klarion and herself in the Tower of Fate. The Outsiders bring the kidnapped teenagers to Taos, but need Kaldur's help with a metahuman girl who can no longer breathe outside of water. Meanwhile, Helga Jace informs Violet that her resurrection powers are slowly killing her. Reeling from this news, Violet finds herself shooting guns and drinking alcohol with Harper Row, who gives her a drunken kiss.
65	19	"Elder Wisdom"	Christopher Berkeley	Paul Giacoppo	July 23, 2019	319
A United Nations conference is held in Bwundasa, and a terrorist group known as B.I.F. launches an attack. As Miss Martian, Halo, and Terra help Troia fend off an assassination attempt by a mind controlled psychic metahuman and a disguised Lady Shiva, the Outsiders (now including El Dorado) fight the main group in the plaza to save Garth and protect the other diplomats. Luthor calls in the Flash, per the UN's guidelines, having set up the whole attack to make the Outsiders look bad. Later the Outsiders save a little girl at one of Professor Ivo's old labs in Dublin before it explodes, unaware that it was a set up by Batman Inc. to increase their popularity and ruin Luthor's reputation. Luthor's subsequent attempts to smear the Outsiders' reputation further while on Godfrey's show backfire, as public opinion and the Outsiders' parents (after getting re-persuaded) support them, and so Luthor agrees with Godfrey about finding a new method to deal with them. Meanwhile, Violet decides to come clean with Brion, revealing her kiss with Harper and that Gabrielle allowed the assassin who killed his parents into the Markovian palace. Wonder Woman expresses her increasing disapproval of Batman Inc.'s actions; fearing they have crossed the line further. Alone in her room, Violet writes a letter to Brion and the rest of her comrades.
66	20	"Quiet Conversations"	Mel Zwyer	Greg Weisman	July 30, 2019	320
Vic finds the Father-Box tech is taking over his body again, so when Silas comes to help, he trusts his father to stabilize him while Superboy contacts Dreamer for additional help. She lends them a Mother Box and tells him to seek out Metron as only his Mobius Chair can exorcise the Father Box's spirit. This leads them to the Source, where Metron is observing Superman fight Apokoliptian forces who have acquired the final material for their device. When Metron refuses to help, Superboy and Black Lightning pin him while Silas, Brion, and Helga Jace place Vic in the chair. Though displeased at having lost the chance to observe Vic's death, Metron cryptically confirms to Black Lightning that Gretchen Goode is a New God. Free of the Father Box, Vic finally reconciles with his father. Meanwhile, M'gann councils Harper, who confides that her father beats her and her brother. Terra starts having second thoughts about working for Deathstroke. Kaldur takes the aquatic meta girl to Atlantis so she can adjust to her powers and have her stay with his parents. Elsewhere due to her dwindling time, Violet visits the Daou family to give them closure on Gabrielle's behalf.
67	21	"Unknown Factors"	Vinton Heuck	Brandon Vietti	August 6, 2019	321
In Atlantis, the meta-girl has acclimated to underwater life and has chosen the name Dolphin. While watching over her with his partner Wynnde, Kaldur receives a call from Oracle asking him to find Nightwing and Black Lightning, whom she had lost contact with after they broke into Granny Goodness' house, to find evidence of her true nature they can use. Kaldur and Wynnde take the polite approach and ask Granny to return their friends, so she reveals they have been kept in an X-Pit, a pale void that leaves them in agony. Wynnde tries to take back the Mother Box that Nightwing borrowed from Superboy with him, angering Granny. She reveals Nightwing and Lightning have been conditioned by the X-Pit to serve her and tries to use a laser turret to destroy the Mother Box. Violet and Victor feel this happening, and the latter reveals that he can open boom tubes, taking them, Brion, and Garfield to help. Violet cleanses Nightwing and Lightning of the mind control and repairs the Mother Box. Oracle then remote controls the Batwing to knock Granny back so everyone can retreat. Meanwhile, Karen gives birth to a daughter, Rhea, but she is born with a hole in her heart. After Karen repairs it, she debates on whether to activate Rhea's meta-gene to give her a better life. Helga Jace's contact is revealed to be Ultra-Humanite. In a post-credits scene, Granny contacts Darkseid to tell him she has found the Anti-Life Equation, which she believes to be inside Halo.
68	22	"Antisocial Pathologies"	Christopher Berkeley	Rich Fogel	August 13, 2019	322
The Outsiders learn that they have inspired new young metahumans, like Infinity, Inc.; though Geo-Force thinks they are piggybacking off the Outsiders' fame. While Dick is recovering, Jefferson finally realizes everything that has happened since Batman Inc. split from the Justice League was a set-up. The news enrages the Outsiders and Conner when they learn that their closest allies were keeping secrets from them. In the meantime, Helga Jace secretly kidnaps Halo, Tara, and Brion; handing them over to Ultra-Humanite and Granny. Halo is placed under the control of a "cerebral leash" and exposed to an X-Pit, re-polarizing her violet healing aura. Granny then tests said effects on Jace, compelling her to reveal that she lied about Halo dying; she considers the metahumans she creates to be her children and wanted to separate Halo from her "son". Tara frees herself and Brion, thanks to unseen help from Deathstroke. However, Granny kidnaps Halo and sends her to the Orphanage, where another Granny awaits, while Ultra-Humanite escapes with Jace. Tara and Brion reveal what happened, causing Jefferson to leave, as he can no longer trust any of them. Believing the heroes to be nothing but traitors, Tara recommits to Deathstroke. In the meantime, Ultra-Humanite tells the Light that Darkseid will tip the universal balance with Halo as the catalyst for the Anti-Life Equation.
69	23	"Terminus"	Mel Zwyer	Brandon Vietti	August 20, 2019	323
Wonder Woman's portion of the Justice League attacks the Orphanage but quickly falls under Granny's control via the Anti-Life Equation. On Earth, Black Lightning continues to feel dejected by the betrayals until he spends time with his daughters. Gretchen Goode blames meta-teens for break-ins caused by the heroes looking for information on Halo's whereabouts, angering Beast Boy. Vandal Savage provides The Team with Halo's location on the condition they tell Granny he's the one who did it. Miss Martian, Tigress, Superboy, Aquaman, Geo-Force, Terra, Forager, and a still weakened Nightwing boom-tube to the Orphanage. While the older heroes distract the Apokoliptian forces, the other three go to rescue Halo. An injured Nightwing enters a fever dream, M'gann's powers cause them to share an illusion of Wally fighting with them. Geo-Force's squad finds Halo but is easily dispatched by the Justice League. Granny sadistically explains metahumans will be enslaved by the Anti-Life Equation and regular humans will suffer and die from it. Miss Martian attacks everyone so her squad can destroy the X-Pit machine, but Granny forces Halo to activate her violet aura, enslaving everyone present.
70	24	"Into the Breach"	Vinton Heuck	Jonathan Callan	August 27, 2019	324
At the same time as the events occurring at the Orphanage, Beast Boy takes the Outsiders and Victor, wanting to repay Halo for all the times she helped him, to Goode World Studios after the latter senses something there. They find a large Apokoliptian machine, only for Gretchen to throw them into the X-Pit. She fights Beast Boy herself and though he fights valiantly, he is no match for her. Victor is able to use his new abilities to hack into Overlord, the machine that generates the X-Pits, and overpowers it, freeing everyone. Blue Beetle and Victor destroy the machine, causing Gretchen and Overlord to forcibly re-merge with Granny Goodness at the Orphanage. Victor follows and frees Violet, allowing her to use a new rainbow aura to free everyone from the Anti-Life Equation so that they can destroy the X-Pit machine and Overlord. Granny escapes and informs Darkseid of Vandal's betrayal. The Justice League arrests Overlord, the Furies, and Mantis and begins making the preparations to bring the prisoners back to Earth. Returning with the young heroes, Victor, with footage of what Gretchen really is, joins the Outsiders as Cyborg. Meanwhile, Infinity Inc. is revealed to be working for Lex Luthor; staging a take-down of Killer Frost to become more popular than the Outsiders.
71	25	"Overwhelmed"	Christopher Berkeley	Greg Weisman	August 27, 2019	325
On Valentine's Day, Will prepares a romantic dinner with Artemis, but she backs off, feeling that she is betraying Wally. Meanwhile, Brion starts a publicity tour for the Outsiders so that he and Tara can meet with Gregor as a family for the first time in months. Tara informs Deathstroke of this, so the Light arranges for Baron DeLamb to escape prison and stage a military coup. Forager is conflicted over whether to return to New Genesis or remain on Earth, so Conner takes him to Geranium City, where Genomorphs like Dubbilex and Jim Harper are able to hide in plain sight using psychic illusions. After speaking with them, Forager decides to remain on Earth, fighting in the open as an alien Outsider. Dubbilex asks Conner how long he intends to hide himself from the public instead of helping all of society as an open hero. Metron meets with Victor and Violet, whom he considers his grandchildren, to inform them they shall play important roles in what's to come, especially as Darkseid considers them both dangerous threats. Artemis has Zatanna send her to Limbo to meet with Wally's spirit. She wants to stay with him, imagining they have a child, but he tells her she must let him go and move on; giving her closure for Wally's death. Artemis agrees, not knowing it was a mental illusion from Zatanna and M'gann. Artemis and Will agree to remain friends. Meanwhile, with the United Nations bans preventing the league from stopping the Markovia coup, Brion and Tara decide to intervene themselves.
72	26	"Nevermore"	Mel Zwyer	Jim Krieg & Jeremy Adams	August 27, 2019	326
The Outsiders, the Team, and Nightwing's group all enter Markovia to stop Delamb, knowing that the Light plans on the Outsiders botching the mission to push registering and controlling all heroes and outlawing Leaguers who do not comply. Deathstroke informs Tara she must publicly kill Beast Boy. Brion is able to battle and capture DeLamb on live television. Tara gets ready for the kill, but Artemis is able to talk her down: stating the heroes always knew she was working for Deathstroke, but kept quiet so she could decide for herself. She accepts and turns herself in for her crimes. DeLamb proclaims he will never stop trying to get the throne, so Brion executes him. While Violet and Tara are horrified, and the heroes are shocked and disgusted that he crossed the line, Markovian ambassador Zviad Baazovi manipulates Brion into overthrowing his twin brother, becoming king, and kicking the heroes out of Markovia. Black Lightning, Oracle, and Cyborg trace Tara's communicator to expose Lex Luthor as a meta-trafficker and, with Superman and Superboy backing them up, they successfully get Luthor removed from the United Nations. Tara is given a mitigated sentence as long as she does good with the Outsiders, which Superboy and Forager also join. Those behind the Anti-Light step down as leaders of the League and the Team, realizing the error of keeping secrets and manipulations for their misguided attempt on opposing the Light; with all the hero teams reuniting under Black Lightning as their leader and public opinion back on their side. The Light is pleased, with Baazovi being one of them, and using his secret meta-psychic ability to influence Brion as he works with Helga Jace and Infinity Inc. They also keep an eye on Halo as a tool for future plans; Vandal Savage has reconfirmed his partnership with Darkseid. As the heroes celebrate at a cafe, a server wearing a Legion flight ring is seen. In a post-credits scene, Lobo kills a miniature clone of himself, that morphed from the finger he lost during his earlier battle with the heroes. Note: This episode was dedicated to Michel Lyman, an animation timer for the series, who died on May 18, 2019.

== Cast and characters ==
=== The Team ===
- Stephanie Lemelin as Artemis Crock / Tigress
- Danica McKellar as M'gann M'orzz / Miss Martian
- Lauren Tom as Traci Thurston / Thirteen
- Zehra Fazal as Gabrielle "Violet Harper" Daou / Halo
- Alyson Stoner as Barbara Gordon / Oracle
- Jesse McCartney as Dick Grayson / Nightwing
- Cameron Bowen as Tim Drake / Robin
- Mae Whitman as Stephanie Brown / Spoiler
- Kelly Stables as Cissie King-Jones / Arrowette
- Cassandra Cain / Orphan

=== The Outsiders ===
- Greg Cipes as Garfield Logan / Beast Boy
- Mae Whitman as Cassie Sandsmark / Wonder Girl
- Eric Lopez as Jaime Reyes / Blue Beetle
- Jason Marsden as Bart Allen / Kid Flash
- Bryton James as Virgil Hawkins / Static
- Troy Baker as Prince Brion Markov / Geo-Force
- Freddy Rodriguez as Eduardo "Ed" Dorado, Jr. / El Dorado
- Zeno Robinson as Victor Stone / Cyborg
- Jason Spisak as Fred Bugg / Forager
- Tara Strong as Princess Tara Markov / Terra
- Nolan North as Kon-El / Conner Kent / Superboy

=== Justice League ===
- Khary Payton as Kaldur'ahm / Aquaman, Jefferson Pierce / Black Lightning
- Jason Marsden as Ray Palmer / Atom
- Bruce Greenwood as Bruce Wayne / Batman
- Vanessa Marshall as Dinah Laurel Lance / Black Canary
- Kevin Michael Richardson as Doctor Fate, John Stewart / Green Lantern, J'onn J'onzz / Martian Manhunter
- David Kaye as Ralph Dibny / Elongated Man
- James Arnold Taylor as Barry Allen / Flash, Katar Hol / Hawkman
- Alan Tudyk as Oliver Queen / Green Arrow
- Troy Baker as Guy Gardner / Green Lantern
- Zehra Fazal as Shayera Hol / Hawkwoman
- Fred Tatasciore as Rex Mason / Metamorpho
- Jeff Bennett as John Smith / Red Tornado
- Denise Boutte as Raquel Ervin / Rocket
- Chad Lowe as Billy Batson / Shazam
- Zeno Robinson as John Henry Irons / Steel
- Nolan North as Kal-El / Clark Kent / Superman
- Maggie Q as Princess Diana / Diana Prince / Wonder Woman
- Lacey Chabert as Zatanna Zatara
- Tatsu Yamashiro / Katana
- Kate Kane / Batwoman
- Patrick O'Brien / Plastic Man
- Curtis Metcalf / Hardware
- Tora Olafsdotter / Ice
- Beatriz da Costa / Fire
- Augustus Freeman / Icon
- Nathaniel Adam / Captain Atom
- Hal Jordan / Green Lantern
- Daniel Cassidy / Blue Devil
- David Reid / Magog

=== The Light ===
- David Kaye as Vandal Savage
- Jenifer Lewis as Olympia Savage
- Marina Sirtis as Queen Bee
- Mark Rolston as Lex Luthor
- Khary Payton as Daniel "Danny" Brickwell / Brick
- Thom Adcox as Klarion the Witch Boy
- Fred Tatasciore as Slade Wilson / Deathstroke
- Danny Trejo as Bane
- Zehra Fazal as Cassandra Savage
- Gwendoline Yeo as Sandra Wu-San / Lady Shiva
- Greg Weisman as Ultra-Humanite
- Grey Griffin as Helga Jace, Whisper A'Daire
- Steve Blum as Count Vertigo
- Jeff Bennett as Abra Kadabra
- Troy Baker as Simon Ecks
- Josh Keaton as Eric Needham / Black Spider
- Roger Craig Smith as Orm / Ocean-Master
- Nick Chinlund as Lawrence "Crusher" Crock / Sportsmaster
- Dwight Schultz as Jervis Tetch / Mad Hatter
- Joel Swetow as Richard Swift / Shade
- Diane Delano as Devastation
- Yuri Lowenthal as Zviad Baazovi, Cameron Mahkent / Icicle Jr., Otto Von Furth / Plasmus, Tommy Terror
- Zeno Robinson as Leonard Smalls / Holocaust
- Alan Tudyk as Psimon
- Nolan North as Baron Frederick DeLamb / Baron Bedlam
- Cairo De Frey/Scorpia A'Daire

=== New Gods of Apokolips ===
- Michael-Leon Wooley as Darkseid
- Dee Bradley Baker as DeSaad, Kalibak
- Deborah Strang as Gretchen Goode, Granny Goodness
- Grey Griffin as Big Barda
- Gilotina
- Lashina
- James Arnold Taylor as G. Gordon Godfrey
- Benjamin Diskin as M'comm M'orzz / Ma'alefa'ak
- Andrew Kishino as Mantis

=== Doom Patrol ===
- Scott Menville as Niles Caulder / Chief, Steve Dayton / Mento
- Hynden Walch as Rita Farr / Elasti-Woman
- Tara Strong as Valentina Vostok / Negative Woman
- Khary Payton as Clifford "Cliff" Steele / Robotman

=== Suicide Squad ===
- Sheryl Lee Ralph as Amanda Waller
- Crispin Freeman as George "Digger" Harkness / Captain Boomerang
- Khary Payton as David Hyde / Black Manta
- Monsieur Mallah
- Rick Flag

=== Meta-Human Youth Center ===
- Bruce Greenwood as Eduardo Dorado, Sr.
- Britt Baron as Leslie Willis / Livewire
- Daniela Bobadilla as Andie Murphy / Mist
- Zehra Fazal as Wendy Jones / Windfall
- Lauren Tom as Celia Windward
- Grey Griffin as Lia Briggs
- Nathaniel Tryon / Neutron

=== The Forever People ===
- Bill Fagerbakke as Bear
- Grey Griffin as Dreamer

=== Infinity Inc. ===
- Zehra Fazal as Eliza Harmon / Trajectory
- Everyman
- Fury

=== Additional characters ===
- Zehra Fazal as Lian Harper, Harper Row, Madia Daou
- Crispin Freeman as Roy Harper / Arsenal, Will Harper / Red Arrow, Jim Harper / Guardian, King Gregor Markov
- Greg Weisman as Lucas "Snapper" Carr
- Grey Griffin as Lois Lane, Troia
- Kelly Hu as Jade Nguyen / Cheshire, Paula Nguyen-Crock
- Nolan North as Zatara
- Yuri Lowenthal as Garth / Tempest
- David Sobolov as Lobo
- Jacqueline Obradors as Alanna
- Masasa Moyo as Cat Grant, Anissa Pierce, Karen Beecher
- Whitney Moore as Courtney Whitmore
- Hynden Walch as Queen Perdita
- Khary Payton as Silas Stone, Amistad Ervin
- Jacob Vargas as Cisco Ramon
- Denise Boutte as Lynn Stewart-Pierce
- Vic Chao as Doctor Moon
- Nicole Dubuc as Iris West-Allen
- Beth Payne as Sarah Charles
- Jeff Bennett as Casey Klebba
- Kath Soucie as Mera
- Kevin Michael Richardson as Paul Sloane, Mal Duncan
- Oded Fehr as Ra's al Ghul
- Keone Young as Sensei
- Steve Blum as Dmitri Pushkin / Rocket Red
- Geoff Pierson as Jay Garrick
- Mae Whitman as Helena Sandsmark
- Phil LaMarr as Metron, King Orin, Dubbilex, Cal Durham
- Sammy Sheik as Samad Daou
- Tiya Sircar as Dolphin
- Tara Strong as Sha'lain'a, Casey Brinke
- Robbie Daymond as Wyynde
- Jason Spisak as Wally West, Monkey
- Josh Keaton as Jason Todd
- Troy Baker as Tod Donner
- Talia al Ghul
- Damian Wayne
- Don and Dawn Allen
- Jonathan Kent
- Joan Garrick

== Production ==
=== Cancellation and revival ===
In January 2013, Cartoon Network had meetings with potential clients and promotional partners in which they announced their 2013–14 programming lineup with Young Justice being absent. A Warner Bros. Animation representative confirmed in an interview with Newsarama the cancellation of both Young Justice and Green Lantern: The Animated Series, with the DC Nation block replacing the series with Teen Titans Go! and Beware the Batman. While a fan-campaign was created in the hopes of financing continuations for both shows, Warner Bros. halted the campaign in May as they did not believe the goal could be reached.

In December 2013, Kevin Smith and Paul Dini claimed in an episode of Smith's podcast Fatman on Batman, that Young Justice was cancelled due to the program's high female viewership, as network executives did not believe girls would buy toys based on the show. Greg Weisman however denied this rumor and in a January 2016 episode of "The Hip-Hop Nerd" podcast, revealed the real reason why it was canceled. The show's funding was based on a toy deal with the toy company Mattel and due to low toy-sales, Mattel pulled the funding. With no other source of income to replace the money Mattel provided, the series was effectively canceled.

The possibility of Young Justice revival first occurred in early February 2016 when the series' second season was released on Netflix, with Weisman urging fans to watch all episodes "over and over" or buy Blu-rays if they wished for a third season. Weisman later clarified that while neither Warner Bros. nor Netflix had expressed interest in picking up the show for a third season, high viewership on Netflix could motivate Warner Bros. into renewing the show. During June, Weisman revealed that the possibility of Young Justice being renewed was "very real" but noted that fans needed to keep the show trending to convince Warner and Netflix of its potential.

On November 7, 2016, it was officially confirmed by Sam Register, president of Warner Bros. Animation and Warner Digital Series, that Young Justice was renewed for a third season, stating that the dedicated fanbase and "[its] rallying cry for more episodes" resonated with them. It was also confirmed that Weisman and Brandon Vietti would be returning as showrunners.

=== Development and writing ===
Weisman revealed in December 2016, that he and Vietti had already started working on the show's third season, and that the series would pick up story elements from the first two seasons, as well as the tie-in comic series. On February 27, 2017, Phil Bourassa—lead character designer of Young Justice—revealed that he had begun working on the third season. A week later, he revealed that some scripts had already been completed. On April 25, it was announced that the show's third season would be titled Young Justice: Outsiders and would debut on DC's new digital service. In late May, it was revealed that Chris Copeland joined the crew as a storyboard artist.

Outsiders had its own panel at the 2017 San Diego Comic-Con on July 21. During the panel, which was presented by Weisman, Vietti and Bourassa, they revealed that the first 12 scripts had already been finalized, ten were still being written and four more had not been started yet; this brought the total number of episodes for Outsiders to 26. The team's current roster was also revealed, consisting of: Static, Kid Flash, Robin, Wonder Girl, Spoiler, Blue Beetle, Beast Boy, and Arsenal as well as new characters Arrowette and Thirteen. It was also revealed that Dick Grayson / Nightwing, Artemis Crock, and Superboy would all be returning. Vandal Savage and the Light were confirmed to return. Regarding the all-black stealth suits worn by Nightwing, Artemis, Superboy, and Black Lightning, Bourassa stated that they are connected to Nightwing's story arc from the second season. The show jumps forward a few years.

Due to Young Justice: Outsiders airing on a streaming service rather than a television channel, it would "skew more adult to keep up with the characters as they age". When discussing the third season additions to "The Team" and its line-up, Weisman said that while the show would continue to focus on the characters introduced in the first season, they also wanted to introduce new characters as Young Justice is "a show about generations". According to Vietti, Outsiders would revisit ideas that he and Weisman had originally planned while making the first two seasons of the series.

=== Casting ===
The first voice actor confirmed to return was Khary Payton as Aqualad in February 2017. It was later revealed in April that voice work on Outsiders had started. In May, Alyson Stoner was later confirmed to return. In June, Nolan North revealed that he had recorded five episodes. In July, Marina Sirtis confirmed she would return to voice Queen Bee. David Kaye and James Arnold Taylor replaced Miguel Ferrer and Tim Curry as Vandal Savage and Glorious Godfrey due to Ferrer having died in 2017 and Curry having retired. The show's voice work is recorded at Bang Zoom! Studios, succeeding at Studiopolis where the first two seasons were recorded at.

=== Animation ===
As with the previous seasons, Weisman confirmed that studios in South Korea are working on the animations. Digital eMation, another Korean studio which have not worked on the series before, was also confirmed to be animating certain episodes. Post-release credits have shown that DR Movie and Digital eMation (credited as eMation) have worked on alternating episodes, and none of the studios from the first two seasons were involved in the production. The episodes "Nightmare Monkeys" and "Illusion of Control" were animated by Studio Mir.

== Release ==
=== Digital release ===
Young Justice: Outsiders premiered on January 4, 2019, on DC Universe, DC Comics' digital media service. The first 13 episodes were released throughout January, with three episodes being released every Friday except January 25, where four episodes were released. The second half of 13 episodes premiered on July 2, 2019. In November 2017, it was announced that Outsiders would premiere "sometime after September", during the fourth quarter of 2018, but was pushed back to 2019 in June 2018.

On November 1, 2020, the series was made available on HBO Max.

=== Marketing ===
A panel to promote Outsiders was held at San Diego Comic-Con on July 21, 2017, and was attended by Greg Weisman, Brandon Vietti, and Phil Bourassa. At the panel, two pieces of artwork were released, showcasing the main members of the Team, which included three new characters. Additionally, new designs for Nightwing, Artemis, Superboy, and Black Lightning were also shown. Another panel was held at SDCC on July 20, 2018. The panel was once again attended by Weisman, Vietti, and Bourassa, alongside voice actors Troy Baker and Stephanie Lemelin. During the panel, the first trailer was released, introducing numerous new characters.

On August 31, 2018, it was announced that a DLC level pack based on the series would be integrated for Lego DC Super-Villains. The level pack was released on May 14, 2019, and retells the events of the season two episode "Summit".

The second half of Outsiders was promoted at RTX during the weekend of July 5, 2019, in Austin, Texas, at the Austin Convention Center.
