= Masters of Disaster (comics) =

Supervillains in DC Comics

Publication information
- Publisher: DC Comics
- First appearance: Batman and the Outsiders #9 (April 1984)
- Created by: Mike Barr (writer); Jim Aparo (artist)

In-story information
- Member(s): Coldsnap; Heatstroke; New Wave; Shakedown; Windfall

The Masters of Disaster are a team of supervillains appearing in American comic books published by DC Comics. They are a group of mercenary metahumans whose superhuman abilities correspond to a force of nature: earth, wind, fire, and water.

The Masters of Disaster appeared in the second season of the live-action television series Black Lightning.

== Fictional team history ==
=== First Masters of Disaster ===
Throughout their appearances in Adventures of the Outsiders #34, Batman and the Outsiders Annual #2, and the Outsiders series, the Masters of Disaster (consisting of Coldsnap, Heatstroke, New Wave, Shakedown, and Windfall) fight and are defeated by Batman's Outsiders on multiple occasions and Looker on one occasion.

They assist Baron Bedlam and his Soviet-backed invasion of the country of Markovia which results in many soldiers dying during the invasion. The Outsiders attack an enemy camp and encounter the Masters. Learning from a previous encounter, the team defeats the Outsiders.

Windfall develops sympathetic feelings for the Outsiders and secretly works to keep them alive until her teammates discover her treachery and capture her. They send a clone of Windfall to infiltrate the Outsiders, but she is killed in battle while the original Windfall defects to the Outsiders.

As of Outsiders (vol. 2) #9, the remaining Masters were incarcerated in a prison nicknamed the Slab. They join forces with Geo-Force to escape. However, New Wave disagrees with this, leading to her killing Shakedown.

=== Second Masters of Disaster ===
The Masters subsequently recruit Dust Devil and Mudslide before fighting the Outsiders once more.

=== Third Masters of Disaster ===
Following the events of "The New 52" (a reboot of the DC universe) and the "Forever Evil" storyline, Heatstroke and New Wave attack a prison transport carrying Coldsnap and Shakedown, only to be intercepted by SWAT officers.

In 2016, DC Comics implemented another relaunch of its books called "DC Rebirth" which restored its continuity to a form much as it was prior to "The New 52". Coldsnap and Heatstroke are later recruited into the Suicide Squad to assist Katana in fighting Kobra.

=== Fourth Masters of Disaster ===
A new incarnation of the Masters of Disaster appears in the series Black Lightning, led by Volcana and consisting of Groundswell, Shakedown, and Windfall. They are first seen attacking Steelworks Site B, where they are fended off by Natasha Irons, Lightning, and Black Lightning. Black Lightning, Thunder, Lightning, and Grace Choi later save Windfall from the Sons of Liberty. Windfall accompanies the group to the Southside Heights' Millennium Hotel to confront the Masters of Disaster. Volcana is defeated while Groundswell is tended to by doctors at Steelworks. Black Lightning later learns that Jay Harriman had secretly manipulated the Masters of Disaster.

== Members ==
=== First Masters of Disaster ===
- Rebecca "Becky" Jones / New Wave – The group's leader and older sister of Windfall who can transform into living water.
- Shakedown – The group's peacekeeper who possesses near-invulnerability and can generate powerful vibratory blasts.
- Darryl / Coldsnap – A metahuman who can generate extreme cold and is in love with Heatstroke despite not being able touch her due to his powers. Coldsnap joined the group to raise money to cure a medical condition.
- Joanne / Heatstroke – A metahuman who can generate extreme heat and is in love with Coldsnap. Heatstroke joined the Masters of Disaster to raise money to cure a medical condition.
- Wendy Jones / Windfall – New Wave's younger sister and a metahuman who possesses aerokinesis. She is sympathetic towards Halo, which contributes to Windfall leaving the group.
- Windfall clone - A clone of Windfall who was once used by the Masters of Disaster.

=== Second Masters of Disaster ===
- Coldsnap
- Dust Devil – A later addition to the group who can fly and also possesses aerokinesis.
- Heatstroke
- Mudslide – A later addition to the group who can cause earthquakes and generate heat in his hands, which allows him to liquefy objects.
- New Wave

=== Third Masters of Disaster ===
- Coldsnap
- Heatstroke
- New Wave
- Shakedown

=== Fourth Masters of Disaster ===
- Groundswell - A metahuman with aquakinesis.
- Shakedown - A blonde metahuman with the same powers as the original Shakedown.
- Volcana - A pyrokinetic enemy of Superman.
- Windfall - An African-American metahuman with the same powers as the original Windfall.

== In other media ==
- The Masters of Disaster appear in the DC Nation Shorts: Thunder and Lightning episode "Lightning Under the Weather".
- The Masters of Disaster appear in the second season of the Black Lightning, consisting of New Wave (portrayed by Brooke Ence), Marcus Bishop / Shakedown (portrayed by Hosea Chanchez), Joe / Heatstroke (portrayed by Esteban Cueto), and Coldsnap (portrayed by Derrick Lewis). This version of the group originated as part of an A.S.A. experiment called "Project Masters of Disaster", which aimed to turn violent inmates into a metahuman attack squad before they were put into stasis pods for 25 years. Throughout the season, Tobias Whale discovers the group's existence and steals their pods to build up a metahuman army. Over time, he gradually awakens them to help him terrorize Freeland and fight Black Lightning and Thunder, who eventually defeat them while Whale's former underling Lala shoots Heatstroke.
  - Additionally, a character loosely based on Windfall named Wendy Hernandez appears in the series, portrayed by Madison Bailey.
