= Katana (DC Comics) =

DC Comics character

- Katana as depicted in The Other History of the DC Universe #3 (March 2021). Art by Giuseppe Camuncoli (pencils), Andrea Cucchi (inks), and Jose Vallarrubia (colors).

Publication information
- Publisher: DC Comics
- First appearance: The Brave and the Bold #200 (July 1983)
- Created by: Mike W. Barr (writer); Jim Aparo (artist)

In-story information
- Alter ego: Tatsu Yamashiro (山城 タツ)
- Team affiliations: Suicide Squad; Justice League; Outsiders; Birds of Prey; Justice League United
- Abilities: Master swordswoman; Master martial artist and hand-to-hand combatant; Soultaker Sword grants: Ability to capture the spirit of every being it kills and communicate with it, including that of her deceased relatives and husband

Katana (Tatsu Yamashiro (山城 たつ, Yamashiro Tatsu)) is a superheroine appearing in American comic books published by DC Comics. First appearing in 1983, Katana is a samurai warrior whose skill with a sword allows her to fight for justice as a superheroine. Her tragic backstory includes the death of her husband, Maseo, whose soul becomes trapped in her blade, the Soultaker.

Katana has been part of various DC Comics superhero teams, including the Justice League and Birds of Prey, but is most commonly associated with the Outsiders, a team of heroes hand-picked by Batman to act as his personal black ops team, handling riskier missions. Of the character's first appearances, one critic has noted, "The idea that a superhero would wield a sword which caught the souls of the wielder’s victims was not very superhero-y. But Katana was from the start a rough and tumble character happy to use throwing stars as weapons (even if she usually used the flat of her sword otherwise)."

In the 2010s, DC began to feature the character much more extensively in media adaptations of its comic books, including a recurring role in the animated series Batman: The Brave and the Bold and a starring role in the series Beware the Batman. The character was portrayed by Rila Fukushima in the Arrowverse TV series Arrow and by Karen Fukuhara in the 2016 DC Extended Universe film Suicide Squad. Katana has also been featured in direct-to-video animated films and a number of DC Comics video games.

== Creation ==
In a 2015 interview with ComicsAlliance, Mike W. Barr spoke on the character's genesis, stating:

When we created Batman and the Outsiders, we brought in, of course, Black Lightning and Metamorpho, who were pre-existing characters, which we thought would give the series some sort of gravitas and a sense of existing in the DC Universe. Then we needed three new characters, and so far, none of the characters we'd picked for the Outsiders had been women, so I decided that there would be an almost mini-Batman-and-Robin team, Katana and Halo. I'd always been interested in Japanese culture and samurai, so I decided that the character of Katana would be a female samurai.

== Publication history ==
Katana first appeared in The Brave and the Bold #200 (cover-dated July 1983) and was created by writer Mike W. Barr and artist Jim Aparo. She is frequently a member of "team" publications such as Batman and the Outsiders, Birds of Prey (during the New 52 era), and Suicide Squad (during the DC Rebirth era).

In February 2013, Katana received her own series as part of The New 52, written by Ann Nocenti and with art by Alex Sanchez. Katana lasted for ten issues, with the final issue being released on December 11, 2013.

== Fictional character biography ==
=== Becoming Katana ===
Tatsu Yamashiro (山城 たつ) is an average Japanese girl, save for her proficiency in the martial arts, a trait encouraged by her parents. Brothers Maseo and Takeo Yamashiro (from whom she gained her current surname) both proclaim their love for her. While she likes both, she chooses Maseo as her husband. Enraged, Takeo refuses to attend the couple's wedding. Maseo disowns his brother, who joins the yakuza and takes their mark of a dragon tattoo across his chest. Tatsu and Maseo, mourning the deaths of Tatsu's parents, start a family of their own. Tatsu gives birth to twins, Yuki and Reiko. Meanwhile, Takeo rises through the yakuza ranks and indulges his "exotic tastes" for ancient weapons. He is presented with twin swords by General Karnz (a henchman of Baron Bedlam), one of which Takeo favors for its mystical properties.

Takeo spends days preparing himself before taking both swords to the Yamashiro residence, demanding his brother to duel for the "prize" of Tatsu. During the course of the struggle, a fire is started, and — while Maseo is distracted by his children — Takeo kills his brother with the sword that later becomes known as "Soultaker". Tatsu arises just in time to see her husband die and engages Takeo, gaining the upper hand and disarming him. Attempting to save her children, she hears her husband's voice coming from the sword, telling her they are already lost.

Dead inside from the loss of her family, Tatsu buries her grief by undergoing months of relentless physical conditioning, combat, and sword training under the master Tadashi. After graduating from his tutelage, she moves to America and creates a mask and costume to wear as the vigilante "Katana". She continues to wield Soultaker, as it contains the last remaining traces of Maseo's soul and voice.

=== Becoming an Outsider ===
Katana as depicted in Batman and the Outsiders #1 (June 1983). Art by Jim Aparo (pencils and inks) and Adrienne Roy (colors)

Eventually Tatsu journeys to Markovia, a small Baltic state, where she tracked down Karnz, and is successful in killing him, inadvertently implicating Black Lightning (coincidentally there with Batman) in her crime. Attempting to rectify the misunderstanding by freeing Black Lightning, she encounters a young girl named Halo. The two join up to rescue Black Lightning, Batman (himself captured due to a blunder by Halo), and Bruce Wayne's employee Lucius Fox from their captor, Baron Bedlam.

Batman is himself in Markovia to rescue Lucius Fox, and having sought—and failed to gain—the help of the Justice League of America, resigned his membership in the Justice League. Inspired by the teamwork he encounters between Black Lightning, Katana, Halo, Geo-Force (Prince Brion of Markovia), and Metamorpho (also coincidentally present), Batman decides to form the Outsiders. The team manages to end the Baron's tyranny in Markovia and moves to Gotham City, where they set up their headquarters (a former penthouse of Bruce Wayne / Batman). Tatsu becomes Halo's guardian and the two move into the penthouse.

At the same time, Takeo is still at large and follows Tatsu to Gotham City. He attacks her and Halo at their home, overpowers Tatsu and switches swords with her. He leaves for Tokyo with Tatsu on his tail. The Outsiders follow Tatsu and offer their help, despite her desire to leave them out of it. Takeo takes the sword to Oyabun, the godfather of the yakuza. Performing a specific ritual, the Oyabun and Takeo call forth the souls that inhabit the sword and give them corporeal form. Among them are legendary mercenaries and assassins, but also Maseo, who is now a slave to the Oyabun. Katana— and the Outsiders— have to fight them all, but she is ultimately able to reclaim the Soultaker from Maseo. She is forced to kill her husband, and then take the opportunity to kill Takeo, finally putting some of her ghosts to rest. Maseo and those killed a second time by Soultaker pass on to their eternal rewards, leaving Takeo trapped in the sword in his place.

At one point the Outsiders split from Batman's leadership and take up residence in Markovia, where they are funded by its royal family. They move to the city of Los Angeles and make their headquarters in the Markovian embassy, while retaining another secret HQ just off the shore. Although Tatsu left her past behind, the Oyabun returns and sends a tengu after her, with which he captures her. This mischievous spirit possesses her, and the Oyabun is able to use her as an assassin. Her teammates Halo and Looker save her using other tengu and the tengu leader, who aids them in battle.

=== Family debt ===
Katana from The Showcase: To The Hilt, in the cover of the comic book. Art by Lynne Yoshii, and Beth Sotelo

After various tragic events surrounding Geo-Force's parents and Markovia, the team disbands. Nonetheless, the Outsiders are forced to defend Markovia against the Manhunters. During the fight, Halo is knocked into a coma, saving Katana's life. Bounded by giri-ninjo (a debt of honor even unto death), Tatsu leaves the team to tend to Halo's wounds. During that time, however, she is approached by a family member of her husband, who wishes her to accompany the Suicide Squad on a mission to destroy a large hoard of weapons that is about to be sold to the yakuza. She declines on the basis of her giri-ninjo, but is willing to help if the need is truly desperate. That family member is later killed, and she goes after the killer, the Daichi-Doku's Oyabun (of which her relative is a member), who does not wish to see the weapons destroyed and tries to stop the Suicide Squad. During that adventure, she saves the life of Bronze Tiger and Manhunter (Mark Shaw), making them honor-bound to her by giri-ninjo. Mark Shaw then assists her in taking down the Daichi-Doku's Oyabun. The Oyabun commits seppuku and Katana stands by as his "second", ready to help with a blade strike so he can keep his honor.

=== Returning to the Outsiders ===
Eventually, the Outsiders re-form and return to Markovia. Instead of a peaceful reunion, however, the team becomes trapped in a web of public relations that brand them outlaws. Although the charges are dropped eventually, the team is fractured. Halo dies from an assassin's blast but is reborn in a new body. This puts an immense strain on Tatsu's relationship with Halo. Katana joins a team with Geo-Force and Technocrat, taking the lead. She develops a mild romantic relationship with Joey Hong, an Asian associate of Guy Gardner. During a lone mission, her old mentor Tadashi sends Lady Shiva to claim Katana's Soultaker sword. Shiva confronts Katana, who is battling a gang of drug dealers. Katana slays many of them, but refuses to kill the youngest member, something Shiva insults her for. Shiva, renowned as the world's greatest assassin and fighter, kills Katana with her own sword. Katana returns to life after a trial by combat within her sword, which includes confronting many of the souls of the people she killed. Afterwards, she finds her old mentor and takes his life. The two splinter teams eventually reunite to take on more supernatural threats focused around the new team member Sebastian Faust. Katana and her friends suffer through the mental and physical tortures that Faust's father, Felix, put them through. Halo eventually frees them by destroying several of Felix's items of power. Soon after, the group breaks apart. After disbanding, Tatsu keeps her association with her old allies among the Outsiders (such as Black Lightning, Geo-Force, and Halo), and although they do not operate as an official team, they are always together during major crises. Her close ties to Batman also see her fighting by his side, several times, notably during the Imperiex crisis and the Day of Judgment incident when Hell invaded Earth. The main battle against the villain, the rogue angel Asmodel, with the power of the Spectre, takes place in New York. Katana personally protects Madame Xanadu who guards the rest of Asmodel's power with a mystical shield. Katana's protection of Xanadu is assisted by Doctor Occult, Phantom Stranger, and Alan Scott. Later, Katana assists Batman when he and Superman are declared outlaws. Katana is also called upon by Black Canary, together with other female mercenaries, to rescue Oracle from Senator Pullman. After Oracle is saved, Katana receives a card, together with the promise of a favor if required. Katana later returns to aid Oracle in issue #108 alongside dozens of other agents.

Katana as she appeared with the Outsiders in 2009

=== New Outsiders ===
Later Katana joins a new team of Outsiders after assisting them in defeating a more powerful Sabbac. That team consists of all new members, with the exception of Metamorpho who rejoins the team after Shift's demise. In Outsiders (vol. 3) #42, Katana dons a new costume, as she feels it inappropriate to wear a costume based on Japan's flag, since the country revoked her citizenship due to her membership with the controversial team. Later, Katana summons Sabbac to destroy Doctor Sivana's base with hellfire. Katana remains an active member of the Outsiders following the 2006 "One Year Later" continuity jump. Initially, the team is led by Nightwing, but later leadership transfers to Batman. Batman decides to 'test' Katana and the rest of the initial team to design a better team. Katana is Batman's first official recruit.

=== "Blackest Night" ===
While escorting Killer Croc to incarceration, the Outsiders' vehicle is demolished by Maseo, Yuki, and Reiko, who have all been revived as Black Lanterns. Katana, believing that she has been reunited with her lost family, lets her guard down, but is saved from death by her teammates. Realising the truth, she draws her sword, preparing to fight her undead husband. When Katana stabs Maseo, Soultaker reveals to her the Black Lanterns' full intentions. Her attacks soon prove to be completely ineffectual against Maseo, who is instead destroyed by an outpouring of light from Halo, who also destroyed Katana's undead children.

=== New 52 ===
Katana, as she appeared during The New 52 events, on the cover of Katana #1 (April 2013).Art by David Finch.

Katana

Publication information
- Publisher: DC Comics
- Schedule: Monthly
- Format: Ongoing
- Genre: Superhero
- Publication date: February 2013 – December 2013
- No. of issues: 10

Creative team
- Written by: Ann Nocenti
- Artist(s): Alex Sanchez, Cristina Coronas, Bill Sienkiewicz

The events of the 2011 "Flashpoint" storyline led to The New 52, a relaunch of all of DC Comics' monthly books, and a reboot to the DC Universe in-story continuity. In this new continuity, a newly healed Barbara Gordon returns to the Batgirl identity and takes a leave of absence from the Birds of Prey and suggests that Katana take her place full-time on the team.

Katana joins Black Canary and Starling as the third member of the Birds of Prey. Katana is described as a lethal fighter who has spent the last year waging war on the yakuza clan that is responsible for the death of her husband. She is rumored to be mentally unstable due to her belief that her husband's soul, whom she often converses with in Japanese, resides in her sword.

After a number of adventures with the Birds of Prey, Katana leaves the group to keep an eye on a cult of assassins known as the Daggers. She later accepts membership in Amanda Waller's new Justice League of America in exchange for information on her husband's murderers. When DC launched Justice League of America, they also launched the solo series Katana, focusing on Tatsu's abiding mission to track down her husband's killer. The series lasted 10 issues. After this, Katana made an appearance in Green Arrow (vol. 5) #27 (2014), where she is told by the mysterious blind man Magus that the death of her husband relates to the Outsiders, the society formed of various weapon clans and connected to Green Arrow's new origin story. The Soultaker is worked into the Green Arrow mythology as the totem of the Sword Clan, which has parallels in the Fist, Mask, Shield, Axe, Arrow, and Spear Clans. Representatives from each of these clans make up the Outsiders, a secret society dedicated towards ending global corruption, but which is itself largely corrupt. Katana joins the Outsiders. In Green Arrow: Futures End #1 (2014), set five years later in one possible future, Tatsu is shown to still be a member of the Outsiders, which has developed a grudging relationship with Green Arrow, who rejected leadership of the Arrow Clan in the main Green Arrow series five years before.

=== DC Rebirth ===
Amanda Waller recruits Katana to be a co-captain of the Suicide Squad. Later, she joins the latest iteration of The Outsiders.

== Powers, abilities, and weapons ==
Katana is a highly proficient hand-to-hand combatant and swordswoman, having studied martial arts as a child and later being trained by the samurai Tadashi. From her time with the Outsiders and Batman, she develops strong tactical skills.

Katana's Soultaker sword, along with its non-powered twin, was forged in the 14th century by Muramasa, whose swords are said to be cursed and make those who are evil commit evil acts. It sometimes takes the souls of those it kills, storing them inside the sword, where they can engage in limited communication with whoever wields it. These souls and spirits can be freely reborn/reincarnated by the means of a sacred ritual, under which they serve their summoner, even if it is against their will. Its cutting edge is sharp enough to rend the Dilustel skin of Captain Atom and Major Force. In The New 52, the Soultaker is established as being the 'Sword Totem' of the Outsiders, meaning like the other totems, it supposedly bestows immortality and enlightenment upon its wielder, although some like Green Arrow are skeptical of the literal truths of these statements.

In addition to the Soultaker, Katana often carries additional weaponry into battle.

== Collected editions ==
Title	Material collected	Pages	Published date	ISBN
Katana Volume 1: Soul Taker	Katana #1-10 and Justice League Dark #23.1 The Creeper	144	August 26, 2014	978-1401244118
Suicide Squad: Katana: The Revenge of Kobra	Suicide Squad: Katana: The Revenge of Kobra #1–6	128	July 9, 2019	9781401278311
Suicide Squad Most Wanted: Katana	The Katana portions from Suicide Squad Most Wanted: Deadshot and Katana #1–6	134	September 20, 2016	978-1401264642

== Other versions ==
An alternate timeline version of Katana appears in Flashpoint as a member of the Amazons' Furies.

== In other media ==
=== Television ===
==== Animation ====
Katana as she appears in the first season of Batman: The Brave and the Bold.

- A character inspired by Katana named Tsukuri appears in the DC Animated Universe (DCAU) series Justice League and Justice League Unlimited, voiced by Karen Maruyama. She appears as a member of Aresia's Injustice Gang in the former series and Gorilla Grodd's Secret Society in the latter.
- A teenage Katana appears in Batman: The Brave and the Bold, voiced initially by Vyvan Pham and later by Kim Mai Guest. This version is a member of the Outsiders whose master Tadashi was killed by an evil samurai named Takeo. As a result, she rarely speaks in honor of his lessons in self-control.
- Katana appears in Beware the Batman, voiced by Sumalee Montano. This version is a CIA agent who infiltrated the League of Assassins under the codename Katana and faked her death to steal the Soultaker Sword from them. Through her godfather and friend of her father, Alfred Pennyworth, she becomes Bruce Wayne's bodyguard and partner in crime-fighting, and later a founding member of the Outsiders. According to producer Glen Murakami, she would have become the series' version of Nightwing had the series been renewed for a second season.
- Katana makes non-speaking appearances in Young Justice as a member of the Justice League.
- Katana appears in DC Super Hero Girls (2019), voiced by Rina Hoshino. This version is initially a ruthless vigilante who uses the Soultaker sword to steal criminals' souls instead of capturing them. In her civilian identity, she enrolls in Metropolis High and befriends Diana Prince before fighting her and the Super Hero Girls, believing that they are evil for wanting to help supervillains. Upon learning each other's identities, Katana and Prince argue over their respective methods until the latter sacrifices her soul to defend an innocent. Realizing the error of her ways, Katana releases the souls she had taken and vows to pursue justice properly.
- Katana makes a non-speaking appearance in the Harley Quinn episode "Harlivy" as a member of the Suicide Squad.
- Katana appears in Suicide Squad Isekai, voiced by Chika Anzai.

==== Live-action ====
- Tatsu and Maseo Yamashiro appears in Arrow, portrayed by Rila Fukushima and Karl Yune respectively. This version of the couple have a son named Akio. In flashbacks, she encountered Oliver Queen while he was working for Amanda Waller in Hong Kong. Initially distrusting him, Queen eventually gained Tatsu's trust after saving her and her family from China White, though he was unable to save Akio from the Alpha Omega virus. Due to this, Tatsu went into self-imposed seclusion while Maseo joined the League of Assassins. In the present, the Yamashiros save Queen following his fight with Ra's al Ghul before Tatsu joins him in stopping Ra's from releasing the Alpha Omega virus on Starling City. In the process, she battles Maseo in the hopes of convincing him to leave the League, but is forced to kill him. Afterwards, she returns to Japan, joins the Crescent Order, and is tasked with guarding the lotus elixir as of the episode "Unchained", though Nyssa al Ghul convinces Tatsu to let her use it to save Thea Queen's life. As of the episode "Welcome to Hong Kong", Tatsu reveals she was excommunicated from the Crescent Order for failing to protect the lotus elixir and learned of the Monitor while helping Queen prepare for an impending "Crisis".
- Tatsu's feudal Japan ancestor, Masako Yamashiro, appears in the Legends of Tomorrow episode "Shogun", portrayed by Mei Melançon.

=== Film ===
- Katana makes a minor non-speaking appearance in Superman/Batman: Public Enemies.
- An alternate universe version of Katana named Sai makes a non-speaking appearance in Justice League: Crisis on Two Earths as a minor member of the Crime Syndicate.
- Katana appears in Suicide Squad, portrayed by Karen Fukuhara. This version is Rick Flag's bodyguard who seeks to avenge her husband's death.
- Katana makes a non-speaking cameo appearance in Teen Titans Go! & DC Super Hero Girls: Mayhem in the Multiverse.
- Katana appears in Justice League: Crisis on Infinite Earths.

=== Video games ===
- Katana appears as a playable DLC character in Lego Batman 2: DC Super Heroes.
- Katana appears as a character summon in Scribblenauts Unmasked: A DC Comics Adventure.
- Katana appears as a playable DLC character in Lego Batman 3: Beyond Gotham.
- Katana appears as a playable character in Infinite Crisis, voiced by Kelly Hu.
- Katana appears as a playable character in Lego DC Super-Villains, voiced again by Sumalee Montano.

=== Miscellaneous ===
- Katana appears in Smallville Season 11 as a member of the Outsiders.
- Katana appears in DC Super Hero Girls (2015) and its tie-in films, voiced by Stephanie Sheh. This version is a student at Super Hero High.
- Katana appears in the Injustice 2 prequel comic as a member of the Suicide Squad.
