= Helga Jace =

Fictional character in the DC Comics Universe

Publication information
- Publisher: DC Comics
- First appearance: Batman and the Outsiders #1 (August 1983)
- Created by: Mike W. Barr; Jim Aparo

In-story information
- Team affiliations: Outsiders; Markovian royal family
- Abilities: Genius-level intellect

Dr. Helga Jace is a fictional character in the DC Comics Universe. She is a supporting character of the Outsiders and a scientist responsible for giving Princess Tara/Terra and her elder brother Prince Brion/Geo-Force their earth-controlling powers.

Helga Jace has appeared in the animated TV series Young Justice, voiced by Grey DeLisle, and the live-action TV series Black Lightning, portrayed by Jennifer Riker.

== Publication history ==
Created by Mike W. Barr and Jim Aparo, Helga Jace first appeared in Batman and the Outsiders #1 (1983) as an ally of the Outsiders.

In the Millennium storyline, written by Steve Englehart, Jace is revealed to be a villain with her own agenda.

== Fictional character biography ==
Dr. Helga Jace is a scientist and geneticist from Markovia who works for the royal family. After the death of King Viktor, a revolutionary movement breaks out. Jace activates Prince Brion Markov and Princess Tara Markov's metagenes to give them powers. After the process is completed, Jace is kidnapped by invading forces led by Baron Bedlam. She is rescued by Metamorpho of the Outsiders, who hopes she can return him to his human form. Jace agrees after learning that Brion is alive.

After Metamorpho is apparently killed by Simon Stagg, Jace and the Outsiders travel to Egypt, where they resurrect Metamorpho using the Orb of Ra that initially transformed him. The second exposure leaves Rex permanently transformed into Metamorpho, with Jace no longer having the means to cure him.

In the "Millennium" storyline, Jace is revealed to be working for the Manhunters and forces Metamorpho to attack the Outsiders using a chip implanted in his brain. After escaping from Jace's laboratory, Looker tricks Metamorpho into attacking Jace. When Jace attempts to attack Metamorpho, her weapon generates a surge that kills them both.

In the "DC Rebirth" relaunch, Helga Jace is an astrophysicist from Markovia who is working for Kobra under duress. King Kobra later shows Jace the powers of a comatose girl who she had been watching. King Kobra reveals that he caught an Aurakle and plans to weaponize it, leaving the task to Jace. During the Suicide Squad's fight with King Kobra's forces, Katana and Enchantress learn that King Kobra had Jace fuse Violet Harper with the Aurakle. King Kobra, Katana, and Enchantress fight Violet, who is now a vessel for the Aurakle under the name of Halo.

== In other media ==
- Helga Jace appears in Black Lightning, portrayed by Jennifer Riker. This version is a mad scientist who created Tobias Whale's anti-aging serum and was previously incarcerated for her illegal experiments. In the present, during the second season, Jace is forced to help Lynn Stewart and the A.S.A. treat metahuman children before Todd Green frees her on Whale's behalf. Jace is captured by Deputy Chief Henderson and placed in the Freeland Police Department's custody before the bounty hunter Instant rescues her and takes her to Markovia. Throughout the third season, Jace works to stabilize Markovia's metahumans until she is extracted by a team led by Black Lightning and later killed by Commander Carson Williams.
- Helga Jace appears in Young Justice, voiced by Grey DeLisle. This version is a protégé of the Ultra-Humanite, a member of the Light, and personal physician to Markovia's royal family. While working with Baron Bedlam's metahuman trafficking ring, she transforms Tara and Brion Markov into metahumans and kills Gabrielle Daou, who is later resurrected and becomes Violet Harper / Halo. Using her bond with Brion, Jace travels to the United States to infiltrate Nightwing's team. To further her goals, she enters a relationship with Black Lightning and becomes Brion's advisor after he overthrows his brother Gregor as king of Markovia.
