= Terra (character) =

DC Comics characters

- The Tara Markov incarnation of Terra as depicted in The Other History of the DC Universe #3 (March 2021). Art by Giuseppe Camuncoli (pencils), Andrea Cucchi (inks), and Jose Villarrubia (colors).

Publication information
- Publisher: DC Comics
- First appearance: Markov: New Teen Titans #26 (December 1982); Doppelgänger: New Titans #79 (September 1991); Atlee: Supergirl vol. 5 #12 (January 2007)
- Created by: Markov: Marv Wolfman; George Pérez; Doppelgänger: Marv Wolfman; Tom Grummett; Atlee: Jimmy Palmiotti; Justin Gray; Amanda Conner

In-story information
- Alter ego: Tara Markov; Atlee
- Species: Metahuman
- Team affiliations: Teen Titans and Outsiders (as double agent); Black Lantern Corps (Tara Markov); Ravagers
- Partnerships: Deathstroke; Beast Boy
- Abilities: List: Earth manipulation; Creation of fissures, avalanches, earthquakes and mudslides; Rock levitation; Stone shield generation; Stone creature creation; Lava and magma manipulation; Skilled hand-to-hand combatant and strategist

Terra is the name used by multiple characters appearing in American comic books published by DC Comics. The first Terra, Tara Markov, joins the Teen Titans as a double agent for Deathstroke. Markov was created by Marv Wolfman and George Pérez, and debuted in New Teen Titans #26 (December 1982).

The second Terra, a more heroic doppelgänger of Tara Markov, debuted in New Titans #79 (September 1991) and was created by Marv Wolfman and Tom Grummett. The third Terra, Atlee, debuted in Supergirl (vol. 5) #12 (January 2007) and was created by Jimmy Palmiotti, Justin Gray, and Amanda Conner.

The Tara Markov incarnation of Terra has appeared in multiple television series and movies, including Teen Titans (2003) and its spin-off media, voiced by Ashley Johnson; Teen Titans: The Judas Contract, voiced by Christina Ricci; and Young Justice, voiced by Tara Strong.

== Publication history ==
The character was created with an intended finite life span. Co-creator Pérez stated that he and Marv Wolfman knew, "from the very start, that this girl was going to be a traitor and that we were going to kill this character off." When creating the look of the character, Pérez noted that:

I wanted her to be cute but not beautiful. She looked like a young girl. I gave her a substantial overbite, her eyes were wide, her body was slim, she wasn't particularly busty. I wanted her to look almost elven, so that when you see her for the first time wearing full-make up and dressed in a provocative outfit where you know she's just been in bed with Deathstroke that it does jab you a bit. "Whoa, good God! This little girl is a slut!"

A new Terra appeared in Supergirl (vol. 5) #12, while a Terra limited series was being developed, written by Jimmy Palmiotti and Justin Gray, with illustrations by Amanda Conner. Gray commented about the series, "Terra as a character has never had a definitive origin. That includes Terra 1 and 2. This mini will address that fact in some surprising ways and open the door to a new corner of the DCU. Aside from that the emphasis will be on heroism, true blue hero stuff." Palmiotti later stated, "Terra is an enigma for obvious reasons. Every hero in the DCU is in the dark about who she is and why she's doing what she's doing, which is running around the planet saving and helping people. We've been working with Terra for months and months trying to find and develop what's special about her. In the end, it was a very simple angle, make Terra a superhero with plenty of emphasis on heroism. Everything she does is to help other people and in the service of life." The four-issue miniseries was temporarily shelved for a number of reasons, until its biweekly publication spanning November and December 2008. The new Terra previously appeared in Teen Titans vol. 3 #52–54 as part of "The Titans of Tomorrow...Today!" storyline and in the first issue of the Terror Titans limited series. Following this, she briefly appeared in Teen Titans vol. 3 #69 in the climax of the recruitment drive storyline, and became a supporting character in the ongoing Power Girl series.

== Fictional character biography ==
=== Tara Markov ===
Tara Markov, half-sister of Brion Markov (Geo-Force), is the illegitimate daughter of the King of Markovia. While in Markovia, she comes under the care of Helga Jace and, through her experiments, Terra gains the ability to control all forms of earthen matter. After obtaining these powers, her father requested that she leave Markovia for the United States to prevent the scandal of the king having an illegitimate daughter from becoming public. Unlike her more heroic brother, Geo-Force, Terra has deep-rooted psychological issues including malignant narcissism, believing that, with their powers, they should rule Earth rather than help the weaker masses. As a result of this belief, Terra becomes a hitwoman, doing dirty work for others. A notable client is Deathstroke, who she met when she was fifteen and with whom she had a relationship.

In the 1984 storyline "The Judas Contract", Terra joins the Teen Titans as a spy for Deathstroke, giving him the information he needs to capture the Titans. Deathstroke's son Joseph Wilson (Jericho) and Nightwing raid the H.I.V.E. stronghold where the Titans are being held in an attempt to rescue them, but are captured. When presented to Deathstroke, Jericho possesses his father and frees the Titans. Not knowing of Jericho's powers, Terra believes Deathstroke to have turned against her and goes berserk. When the misunderstanding is cleared, she is still furious at Deathstroke for going "soft" with love for his son. While attempting to kill the Titans, Terra destroys the H.I.V.E. complex and is killed when it collapses.

==== Blackest Night ====
In the 2009 event Blackest Night, Terra's corpse is reanimated as a Black Lantern and seduces Beast Boy using an illusion cast by Lilith Clay to mask her decayed appearance. When Hawk (Holly Granger) attempts to take the heart of her former partner Dawn Granger (Dove), Dawn radiates a white energy that destroys Holly's body. Dawn turns the light on the other Black Lanterns, destroying all but Hank Hall, Tempest, and Terra, who retreat.

Terra then travels to the Outsiders' base to see her brother. She claims to have broken free of whatever force was controlling her as a Black Lantern, and begs Geo-Force and the other Outsiders to kill her. However, this is revealed to be a ruse, a way of getting Geo-Force to display the strongest emotions possible. After a mostly one-sided battle, Geo-Force petrifies Terra's body while Halo destroys her power ring.

==== The New 52 ====
In September 2011, The New 52 rebooted DC's continuity. In this new timeline, Terra is re-established as a member of Caitlin Fairchild's Ravagers. The team also includes Beast Boy, Thunder and Lightning, and a new character: Ridge. Terra and Beast Boy develop a strong bond while imprisoned in the Colony, a prison run by the villain Harvest where he experiments on and tortures superpowered teenagers.

After escaping the Colony, Terra and Beast Boy are separated from the other Ravagers and hide in a cave. Brother Blood forces Beast Boy to experience dreams of his teammates in danger and covered with blood in an attempt to access the Red, a mystical force that connects all animal life. Due to his connection with the Red, Beast Boy is the only one able to sense the evil intents of Brother Blood and therefore the key Blood was looking for. After sensing his presence, Terra is convinced to help rescue the remaining Ravagers, who were captured by Blood to be used as a sacrifice.

=== Tara Markov doppelgänger ===
The second Terra is introduced as a young girl from the early 21st century who was exposed to a DNA virus designed to transform her into a genetic doppelgänger of the original Terra. As part of the Team Titans, Terra travels back in time to the year 1992 to stop the birth of Teen Titan Donna Troy's firstborn son, who would grow up to be the tyrant Lord Chaos.

The final issues of Team Titans reveal that the group's mysterious leader is Hank Hall, a former member of the Teen Titans who became the renegade time-traveling villain Monarch. His attempts to erase the universe from existence as part of Hal Jordan's plan to remake the universe during "Zero Hour" result in the Team Titans' home timeline being erased, killing most of the group's members. Terra and Mirage survive due to the aid of the Time Trapper.

In the World War III storyline, Terra appears as a member of the Teen Titans, led by Beast Boy, and helps fights Black Adam. In her second encounter with Adam, Terra catches him off guard by crushing him between two boulders. Although this maneuver hurts Adam, it fails to disable him. He punches through Terra's chest, killing her instantly.

The mystery of the second Terra's origins was addressed in the 2008 Terra miniseries. She was born in an underground world called Strata and was sent away by its members to establish relations with the surface world. She allowed the Stratans to surgically alter her to resemble the original Terra, believing surface-dwellers would more easily accept her if she reminded them of one of their own. The Stratans used an element called "quixium" to grant her earth-based powers similar to that of her predecessor, which also caused her to sustain amnesia.

=== Atlee ===
Promotional cover artwork for Terra #1, by Amanda Conner, featuring the new Terra, known as Atlee.

A new Terra named Atlee appears in Supergirl vol. 5 #12 (January 2007), sporting a new outfit and black hair. She emerges near a party Supergirl is attending, fighting a creature from an underground civilization. While Supergirl expresses disdain for the superhero activities which interfere with her personal life, Terra counters by saying that being a superhero is simply the right thing to do; she does not comprehend Supergirl's complaints. Together they defeat the monster by collapsing the ground under it. Terra then departs. The Terra miniseries reveals that Atlee is a Stratan, similar to the Terra doppelgänger.

During the Final Crisis event, a group of teen supervillains calling themselves the Terror Titans begin abducting metahuman teenagers to use as competitors in the Dark Side Club, an underground arena where the young heroes are brainwashed and forced to fight to the death. After learning of the abductions, Terra goes on the run, eventually meeting up with fellow teen superheroes Aquagirl, Molecule, Offspring, Zachary Zatara, and the Star-Spangled Kid. While deciding on a course of action, the teens are ambushed by the Terror Titans, who proceed to overpower and capture them, killing Molecule in the process. Atlee and the others are taken to the Dark Side Club and subjected to the Anti-Life Equation, which causes them to become slaves to Darkseid and his cadre of followers. After winning several matches in the tournament, Terra is made a member of the Clock King's Martyr Militia, a team of brainwashed superhumans he plans to use on an attack in Los Angeles. Atlee and the others are freed from the Anti-Life Equation when Miss Martian, Rose Wilson, and Static lead a rebellion against the Terror Titans and capture the members of the Dark Side Club.

Rested from her stay with the Titans, Atlee returns to be the sidekick of Power Girl, successfully helping her save Manhattan from the Ultra-Humanite. After that, she elects Manhattan as her base of operation, to benefit from the constant mentoring of Power Girl both in establishing and maintaining a human identity, and in her superhero persona. She takes on an Australian accent in her civilian identity, finding the half-truth of her being from "down under" humorous. She and Power Girl begin a close friendship, going to movies and even shopping together at an IKEA-esque Scandinavian furniture store. Atlee also decides to drop her Australian accent, instead claiming that her new cover identity is that of a spy, something Power Girl finds quite humorous.

== Powers and abilities ==
All incarnations of Terra possesses psychokinetic control over earth and minerals in all its forms. They can easily manipulate vast amounts of earth, shaping it numerous forms with the only limit being their imagination. This also enables them to generate earthquakes, shift tectonic plates, create fissures, summoning volcanoes, transmute raw materials into various crystalline forms, and levitate rocks for fast transportation.

== Other versions ==
- An alternate universe version of Terra from Earth-33 appears in Countdown to Adventure #4. This version is a sorceress.
- An alternate universe version of Terra appears in Team Titans Annual #2. This version is a freedom fighter and partner of Nightrider.
- An alternate universe version of Terra who became a member of the Amazons' Furies appears in Flashpoint.
- An alternate universe version of Terra appears in Teen Titans: Earth One.
- An alternate universe version of Terra appears in Dark Multiverse: The Judas Contract. This version took over Earth and became known as Gaia.

== In other media ==
=== Television ===
Terra as she appears in Teen Titans (left) and Teen Titans Go! (right)
- The Tara Markov incarnation of Terra appears in Teen Titans (2003), voiced by Ashley Johnson. This version is more sympathetic and tragic than her comics counterpart and initially displays little control over her powers, the latter trait being a source of shame for her. While on the run due to her powers, she encounters the Teen Titans, during which she confides in Beast Boy her fear of losing control and he develops a crush on her, and Slade, who claims to know everything about her and offers to help her. Agreeing with Slade, she temporarily leaves the Titans to study under him before returning to serve as a double agent and dates Beast Boy until he breaks up with her when she reveals her true allegiance. She helps Slade take over Jump City and seemingly kills the Titans, but develops second thoughts. After Slade betrays her, she overcomes his control, kills him, and sacrifices herself to save Jump City, turning to stone in the process. Sometime later, Beast Boy discovers Terra disappeared and encounters a girl resembling her with no powers or recollection of what happened.
- The Tara Markov incarnation of Terra appears in Teen Titans Go! (2013), voiced again by Ashley Johnson. This version is friends with Raven and Starfire.
- The Tara Markov incarnation of Terra appears in Young Justice, voiced by Tara Strong. This version is the princess of Markovia and younger sister of Gregor and Brion Markov who gained her powers after being experimented on by Baron Bedlam's metahuman trafficking ring. Following this, she was recruited into the League of Shadows under Deathstroke and worked for them as an assassin for two years before allowing the Outsiders to rescue her and acting as a double agent within their ranks. After Artemis appeals to her better nature, Tara openly defies Deathstroke's order to kill Beast Boy and defects to the Outsiders.
- The Atlee incarnation of Terra appears in Harley Quinn, voiced by Kerry Knuppe. This version is a member of the Legion of Doom via the sub-group, the Natural Disasters, and mentee of Poison Ivy.
  - Atlee makes a non-speaking cameo appearance in the Kite Man: Hell Yeah! episode "Grand Reopening, Hell Yeah!".
- Terra will appear in Super Powers.

=== Films ===
- The Tara Markov incarnation of Terra appears in the mid-credits scene of the DC Animated Movie Universe (DCAMU) film Justice League vs. Teen Titans.
- The Tara Markov incarnation of Terra appears in the DCAMU film Teen Titans: The Judas Contract, voiced by Christina Ricci. This version was branded a witch after her powers emerged during her childhood, though she was rescued by her future adult lover Deathstroke. In the present, she infiltrates the Teen Titans as a double agent. Initially cold and distant, she eventually warms up to them and kisses Beast Boy. On the one-year anniversary of Terra joining the Titans, she and Deathstroke capture most of the Titans and bring them to Brother Blood. After Deathstroke betrays her, Nightwing rescues her and the Titans before she attacks and seemingly kills Deathstroke. Ashamed by her actions, she brings Blood's fortress down on herself and dies in Beast Boy's arms.
- The Teen Titans Go! (2013) and Teen Titans (2003) incarnations of Tara Markov / Terra make non-speaking cameo appearances in Teen Titans Go! vs. Teen Titans.

=== Video games ===
- The Tara Markov incarnation of Terra appears as an unlockable playable character in Teen Titans (2006), voiced again by Ashley Johnson.
- The Tara Markov incarnation of Terra appears as a boss in the DC Universe Online DLC "Teen Titans: The Judas Contract".
- The Tara Markov incarnation of Terra appears as a playable character in Lego Batman 3: Beyond Gotham via the "Heroines and Villainesses" DLC pack.
- The Tara Markov and Atlee incarnations of Terra appear as character summons in Scribblenauts Unmasked: A DC Comics Adventure.
- The Teen Titans Go! incarnation of Tara Markov / Terra appears as a boss in Lego Dimensions, voiced again by Ashley Johnson.
- The Tara Markov incarnation of Terra appears as a playable character in Lego DC Super-Villains, voiced by Laura Bailey.

=== Miscellaneous ===
The Teen Titans (2003) incarnation of Tara Markov / Terra appears in Teen Titans Go! (2004). Her brother Geo-Force approaches the Teen Titans, revealing she is a princess of Markovia who gained her powers after being experimented on by the royal court and ran away. Upon learning of the girl resembling Terra, Geo-Force leaves her alone after seeing how happy she is despite being certain of her identity.
