= Volcana (DC Animated Universe) =

- Volcana as depicted in Superman: The Animated Series

Publication information
- Publisher: DC Entertainment
- First appearance: "Where There's Smoke" (1998)
- First comic appearance: Black Lightning (vol. 3) #2 (December 2024)
- Created by: Hilary Bader
- Voiced by: Peri Gilpin (DC Animated Universe); Jeannie Tirado (Harley Quinn); Haley Tju (Bat-Fam)

In-story information
- Alter ego: Claire Selton
- Species: Metahuman
- Team affiliations: Legion of Doom (Harley Quinn); Poison Ivy's Natural Disasters (Harley Quinn); Masters of Disaster (Black Lightning); Batman family (Bat-Fam)
- Supporting character of: Superman (DC Animated Universe); Black Lightning (DC Universe); Batman (Bat-Fam)
- Abilities: Flight; Pyrokinesis

Volcana (Claire Selton) is a supervillain in the DC Animated Universe (DCAU), appearing in the series Superman: The Animated Series, Justice League, and Justice League Unlimited. Voiced by Peri Gilpin, she made her first appearance in the episode "Where There's Smoke".

The character was later adapted to the non-DCAU animated series Harley Quinn (voiced by Jeannie Tirado) and Bat-Fam (voiced by Haley Tju), depicted in both as a different ethnicity than the red-haired white woman she was in the DCAU and the comic book series Black Lightning.

== Fictional character biography ==
=== Superman: The Animated Series ===
Introduced in the episode "Where There's Smoke", Claire Selton shows an aptitude for pyrokinesis as a teenager. Her parents send her to Metropolis' Center for Paranormal Studies to help her control her powers, but she is taken by government agents, who attempt to weaponize her powers for "Project Firestorm".

Volcana eventually escapes the agents and becomes a thief and fugitive and the project lost its funding. She is eventually recaptured, but Superman rescues her and takes her to a deserted island. Volcana also makes a cameo appearance in the episode "Unity", in which she fights Supergirl.

Volcana appears in issues #20 and #41 of the tie-in comic Superman Adventures.

=== Justice League and Justice League Unlimited ===
Volcana as she appears in the Justice League episode "Only a Dream" Pt. 1.

In the Justice League episode "Only a Dream", Volcana is incarcerated in a Metropolis prison before escaping during a riot. She joins forces with fellow escapee Firefly, but both are subdued by the Justice League.

In Justice League Unlimited, it is revealed that the government project who kidnapped and experimented on her is part of Project Cadmus. She later joins Gorilla Grodd's Secret Society. After Darkseid is resurrected and kills most of the Society, Volcana and the surviving members work with the Justice League to stop him.

== Mainstream comics ==
Volcana appears in Black Lightning (vol. 3) as a member of the Masters of Disaster in addition to being an enemy of Superman.

== Power and abilities ==
Volcana in her fire form.

Volcana possesses pyrokinesis, which allows her to generate fire and fly. As such, she requires oxygen to fuel her powers.

== In other media ==
- Volcana appears in Harley Quinn, voiced by Jeannie Tirado. This version is Hispanic and a member of the Legion of Doom and Poison Ivy's Natural Disasters.
  - Volcana makes a non-speaking cameo appearance in the Kite Man: Hell Yeah! episode "Grand Reopening, Hell Yeah!".
- Claire Selton appears in Bat-Fam, voiced by Haley Tju. This version is Asian-American girl who was the former supervillain Volcano before being turned into a 12-year-old due to an accident with a Lazarus Pit, adopted by Batman while temporarily amnesiac of who she actually was, and who has a living flame as a sidekick.
- Volcana received a figure in Mattel's Justice League Unlimited toyline.
