= Halo (DC Comics) =

- Halo as depicted in Batman and the Outsiders #4 (September 1983), art by Jim Aparo.

Publication information
- Publisher: DC Comics
- First appearance: The Brave and the Bold #200 (July 1983)
- Created by: Mike W. Barr (writer); Jim Aparo (artist)

In-story information
- Alter ego: Gabrielle Doe
- Species: Human/Aurakle (gestalt entity)
- Team affiliations: Outsiders; Strike Force Kobra; Batman Incorporated; Dead Heroes Club; Justice League
- Partnerships: Batman; Black Lightning; Geo-Force; Katana; Looker; Metamorpho; Grace Choi
- Notable aliases: Gabrielle Doe; Marissa Baron; Spectrum; Violet Harper
- Abilities: See list: Aura generation; Violet: Self-healing abilities and resurrection, and can produce empowering mental effects that can give her previous body's consciousness control of their shared body.; Indigo: Tractor beam.; Blue: Hologram generation.; Green: Produce halting stasis beams to stop and manipulate enemies.; Yellow: Light generation; Orange: Concussive blasts.; Red: Energy shield generation, destructive heat beams; White: Light generation

Halo (Gabrielle Doe) is a superheroine appearing in American comic books published by DC Comics. She first appeared in a special insert in The Brave and the Bold #200 (July 1983) and was created by Mike W. Barr and Jim Aparo.

The character's origin involves spirit possession, with an alien being resurrected and possessing the body of a recently murdered woman. Halo initially has amnesia, having no access to the memories of either the alien or the human host.

Halo has made limited appearances in other media, primarily in association with the Outsiders. Zehra Fazal voices Halo in Young Justice, where she is depicted as a Quraci refugee named Gabrielle Daou who was possessed by a Mother Box rather than an Aurakle.

== Publication history ==
Halo first appeared in The Brave and the Bold #200 (July 1983), and was created by writer Mike W. Barr and artist Jim Aparo.

Barr spoke on the genesis for the character, stating:

"Feeling that an attractive ingénue as a team member never hurt sales with what in those days was presumed to be a largely male audience I reached back to my fan days, and more specifically Batman #134 recalling the cover story "The Rainbow Creature!", about a being whose different auras each had a different power. Combining these ideas gave us Halo".

== Fictional character biography ==
Halo is a gestalt of a human woman named Violet Harper and an Aurakle, an ancient energy being resembling a sphere of iridescent light. The Aurakle species emerged from the Source billions of years ago at the dawn of time. When sociopath Violet Harper was murdered by Syonide, an operative of the 100 and Tobias Whale, the Aurakle, who had been observing her out of curiosity, was sucked into Violet's body, resurrecting her. The shock of the death and resurrection induced a profound loss of memory in the new combined entity. She was subsequently found and recruited by Batman to serve as a member of the Outsiders. In one early incident, Halo gains access to the memories of the Aurakle and becomes emotional over the tendency of human beings to kill each other. Halo later has to deal with the consequences of her body's previous actions, which required the assistance of the Outsiders to resolve.

The young Halo is initially the legal ward of her friend and Outsiders teammate Katana. During her stint in the Outsiders, she gains a friend in new member Windfall.

After the Outsiders are framed for the murder of Markovia's queen, they are forced to flee the country. Technocrat's ex-wife, Marissa Barron, hires her old associate Ryer to attack the Outsiders. As the cyborg Sanction, Ryer kills Marissa and Halo. Halo's essence is sucked into Marissa's body, reanimating it. Halo later appears back in the body of its original host, Violet Harper, through unexplained means.

=== Blackest Night ===
During the Blackest Night event, Halo, the Creeper, and Katana are confronted by Katana's family, who have been resurrected as members of the Black Lantern Corps. Halo's light-based abilities prove to be effective against the Black Lanterns, who she destroys. In a later confrontation with Terra, Halo removes and destroys her ring while Geo-Force petrifies Terra's body to prevent her from returning.

=== Batman Incorporated ===
Halo is later selected as a member of a new team of Outsiders, led by Red Robin and funded by Batman Incorporated. Halo and her teammates infiltrate a satellite said to be run by the villainous Leviathan organization, but this is revealed to be a trap set by Lord Death Man and Talia al Ghul. The satellite is destroyed in a massive explosion, making it unclear whether Halo and the others survived.

In The New 52 reboot of DC's continuity, Halo and the Outsiders survived the explosion, but are assumed dead. They now take advantage of their legally-deceased status to perform covert missions for Batman.

In the "DC Rebirth" relaunch, Halo is a comatose girl under the care of Helga Jace. The organization Kobra captures an Aurakle and plans to weaponize it, leaving the task to Jace. During the Suicide Squad's fight with Kobra's forces, Katana and Enchantress learn that King Kobra had Jace fuse Violet Harper with the Aurakle. King Kobra, Katana, and Enchantress fight Violet, who is now a vessel for the Aurakle under the name of Halo.

== Powers and abilities ==
Halo has the ability to fly and to create auras of the seven colors of the rainbow around herself, called halos, which have different effects:

- Red: Allows Halo to create energy shields, levitate, and produce destructive heated beams.
- Orange: Allows Halo to generate concussive blasts.
- Yellow: Allows Halo to generate rays of yellow light from her hands, capable of stunning or blinding others.
- Green: Allows Halo to generate stasis beams that paralyze others and telekinetically manipulate them.
- Blue: Allows Halo to create holographic clones of herself and objects.
- Indigo: Allows Halo to generate tractor beams.
- Violet: Allows Halo to heal and resurrect herself. She can also produce empowering mental effects that can give her previous body's consciousness control.
- White: Allows Halo to generate blinding white light that is strong enough to overcome shadows and dark energies.

== Other versions ==
An alternate universe version of Halo appears in JLA: Another Nail.

== In other media ==
=== Television ===
- Halo makes a non-speaking appearance in the teaser for the Batman: The Brave and the Bold episode "Requiem for a Scarlet Speedster!" as a member of the Outsiders.
- Halo appears in Young Justice, voiced by Zehra Fazal. This version is the product of a Mother Box's spirit reviving the body of Gabrielle Daou, a Quraci refugee who was kidnapped and experimented on by metahuman traffickers and euthanized by Helga Jace after testing negative for a metagene. Initially a blank slate with traces of Daou's personality and memories and limited access to the Mother Box's knowledge and powers, Halo is rescued by Tigress, whom they live with before joining Nightwing's team. They also name themselves Violet Harper, seeing themselves as a new individual; enter a relationship with Brion Markov; and befriend Harper Row. However, Halo breaks up with Brion after he kills his uncle Baron Bedlam. In the fourth season, Young Justice: Phantoms, Halo considers converting to Islam, starts identifying as non-binary, and reconsiders their feelings towards Brion and Violet. As of the fourth season finale, Violet and Harper have entered a relationship.

=== Film ===
An alternate universe version of Halo named Aurora appears in Justice League: Crisis on Two Earths. This version is a member of the Crime Syndicate of America with powers similar to those of a Green Lantern.

=== Video games ===
Halo appears as a character summon in Scribblenauts Unmasked: A DC Comics Adventure.
