= Green Lantern/Superman: Legend of the Green Flame =

2000 DC Comics comic book

Publication information
- Publisher: DC Comics
- Format: One-shot
- Genre: Superhero
- Publication date: 2000
- No. of issues: 1
- Main character(s): Green Lantern; Superman

Creative team
- Written by: Neil Gaiman
- Artist(s): Eddie Campbell; Mark Buckingham; John Totleben; Matt Wagner; Jim Aparo; Kevin Nowlan; Jason Little
- Penciller(s): Mike Allred; Eric Shanower
- Inker(s): Terry Austin; Art Adams
- Letterer: Todd Klein
- Colorist(s): Matt Hollingsworth; Kevin Nowlan

Green Lantern/Superman: Legend of the Green Flame was a one-shot prestige format comic book published in 2000 by DC Comics.

== Plot ==
In 1949 Berlin, Janos Prohaska and Weng Chan of the Blackhawks Squadron go down into a deserted bunker covered in rats and littered with long dead bodies. The two are looking for a German secret weapon Janos heard about from a mysterious 'she'. They come across a strange green railroad lantern buried in a pile of rubbish. Janos is intrigued over the object as he is faintly reminded of a legend surrounding a green lantern although he is unable to recall the specific significance of the lantern, and he decides to take it with him.

In the present day, Clark Kent finds Hal Jordan in Metropolis and invites him over to spend some time together. When Clark asks Hal about his relationship with Arisia Rrab, Hal succinctly states "We split". Clark, aware of how difficult a dual life and a relationship are to manage, also knows that any words as this moment would be too thin to offer any real comfort. Hal explains he's having a personal crisis, stating he used to be part of the Green Lantern Corps with a purpose and a plan. But with Oa drained and the Guardians having fled, all he is now is a man with a ring.

After some reassurances from Clark, they accompany each other to a museum convention Clark is supposed to cover for the Daily Planet, and briefly run into Selina Kyle. They then find the green lantern discovered by Janos in an exhibition. Hal recognizes it as a power battery, and tries charging his power ring with it despite Clark's wariness. The effect is disastrous and a wave of magic energy kills both heroes. They wind up in the Region of the Just Dead and encounter Deadman, who explains that their deaths are not irrevocable until they have gone "into the light". Hal then tries using his ring to take them back to their bodies, the worst thing he could have done.

Meanwhile, the Phantom Stranger sits in the apartment given to him by the Lords of Order, his current masters. Sensing that something else needs his attention, he finally leaves the apartment and dismisses the Lords, who insist that he cannot leave. The Phantom admits to no membership or affiliation with any group and also denies belonging to this place or even having a home, because if he belonged then he would cease to be a stranger. He bids the voices farewell, even as their threats of wrath echo in a now empty room.

Superman and Hal have wound up in Hell, where Superman's super-senses cannot experience anything but suffering, fear and pain. Horrified by realizing that he cannot save these innumerable souls, he is slowly going mad. When the two of them are attacked by blood-thirsty demons, Hal once again uses his ring, and they disappear.

Superman and Green Lantern encounter the power that killed them – the sentient Green Flame, the remains of the magic energies of Maltus. The Green Flame explains that their deaths were a result of Jordan trying to load his scientific ring with supernatural energies. Then it tempts Hal to give in for the supernatural power of the Green Flame instead. At that point, the Stranger appears, and teaches Hal how to tame the corrupt Flame. Hal reads the oath of Alan Scott, loads his ring, and the threat of the Green Flame is neutralized. The Stranger returns Hal's and Superman's souls to their bodies, disposing of the lantern.

Alive after this experience, Hal is feeling better. Superman tells Hal that, even given tonight, it was good to see him, and lets Hal know he is always just a call away. After a warm goodbye, the two heroes part.

== Publication history ==
The script for this book was written after Gaiman's Black Orchid was completed but prior to its publication. It had been solicited by Mark Waid, then-editor of the short-lived anthology Action Comics Weekly, to conclude that title's run as a weekly anthology in 1988. Waid wanted the story to incorporate all of the characters featured in the book at the time: Green Lantern (Hal Jordan), Catwoman, Deadman, the Phantom Stranger, Etrigan the Demon, the Blackhawks, and Superman. Etrigan was later removed from the story, so Gaiman "created an anagrammatic demon creature to replace him, whose dialogue consisted of one sonnet".

Gaiman completed the script and submitted it to Waid, who "loved it". Shortly thereafter, Gaiman received word from Superman group editor Mike Carlin that, as a result of some residual fine-tuning in the aftermath of the character's 1986 reboot, Hal Jordan no longer knew that Clark Kent is Superman. As this was a key element in the plot, the story could not be published as written. Waid, who had a personal philosophy of not interfering with his creative personnel's work, opted not to ask Gaiman for a rewrite. Gaiman was paid for his work and the script was filed away (as revealed in the Green Lantern story in Action Comics Weekly #606 in 1988, Hal Jordan knew Clark Kent to be Superman as he had phoned Clark asking for help; in 1988's Green Lantern Special #1, Superman already knew Hal Jordan as Green Lantern visiting Jordan at his apartment; as each serial in ACW was edited by different editors, continuity was not being maintained by DC editorial).

In 1996, after the phenomenal success of The Sandman, DC sought to repackage Gaiman's earlier uncollected work for the company's Vertigo imprint in a book called Neil Gaiman's Midnight Days. Recalling the previously rejected Action Comics Weekly script, Gaiman sought Carlin's approval to see if the story might now be published apart from established continuity. Carlin agreed, but one further obstacle remained: neither Gaiman nor DC had a copy of the script anymore. Gaiman remembered making a copy of the script for Brian Hibbs, but he no longer had it; however, he had previously copied it for his friend James Barry. Gaiman acknowledged both men in his introduction to the book.

== Credits ==
Written by Neil Gaiman

Art by:

- Eddie Campbell
- Michael D. Allred and Terry Austin
- Mark Buckingham
- John Totleben
- Matt Wagner
- Eric Shanower and Arthur Adams
- Jim Aparo
- Kevin Nowlan
- Jason Little

Cover art by Frank Miller
