= Geo-Force =

DC Comics superhero

- Geo-Force as depicted in Batman and the Outsiders Annual #1 (January 1984). Art by Jim Aparo and Frank Miller.

Publication information
- Publisher: DC Comics
- First appearance: The Brave and the Bold #200 (July 1983)
- Created by: Mike W. Barr (writer); Jim Aparo (artist)

In-story information
- Alter ego: Prince Brion Markov
- Species: Metahuman
- Place of origin: Markovia
- Team affiliations: Justice League; Outsiders
- Partnerships: Terra
- Notable aliases: Deathstroke
- Abilities: Connection to the Geo-Force; Superhuman strength, speed, stamina, and durability; Earth manipulation; Lava manipulation; Heat manipulation; Gravity manipulation; Regenerative healing factor; Geo-positional tracking; Expert hand-to-hand combatant; Skilled strategist and tactician

Geo-Force is a superhero appearing in American comic books published by DC Comics. Created by Mike W. Barr and Jim Aparo, the character debuted in a special insert within The Brave and the Bold #200 (July 1983) before appearing as a primary character in the Batman and the Outsiders series.

The character's real name is Brion Markov, the prince of the fictional country of Markovia and the elder brother of Terra. He is a founding member of the superhero group the Outsiders.

The character has made limited appearances throughout animated and live-action media. He is voiced by Troy Baker in Young Justice and portrayed by Jahking Guillory in Black Lightning.

== Publication history ==
In a 2013 interview with ComicsAlliance, Mike W. Barr spoke on the character's creation, stating:

"Len Wein and I worked out what the new characters would be and sent descriptions to Jim, saying "Draw these up and see what you think." Jim submitted his visual ideas for those characters, with the exception of Geo-Force, who turned out to be the brother of Terra from The New Teen Titans. I'm pretty sure George Perez designed that costume, because it was based on Terra's costume ... We decided even before the book was printed that that would be the connection between the two characters. I had not known about the character. She was still in the planning stages when I came up with the idea for Geo-Force, and Len said "Well, we have this other character with Earth powers in New Teen Titans, what are we going to do about that?" Marv Wolfman was brought in on the discussion of that, and it was Marv's idea that they'd be half-brother and sister."

== Fictional character biography ==
=== Batman and the Outsiders ===
Brion Markov is the prince of Markovia and the half-brother of Tara Markov (Terra). Helga Jace gives them both earth-manipulating superpowers to stop an insurrection mounted by Baron Bedlam. Five other superheroes converge on Markovia for various reasons of their own. Veteran heroes Batman, Metamorpho, and Black Lightning join forces with Geo-Force and two other new heroes, Katana and Halo. After stopping the insurrection, the heroes decide to remain together as the Outsiders, with Batman as leader.

In one of their earliest missions, the Outsiders team up with the Teen Titans, who are led at the time by Batman's sidekick, Robin. It is revealed that Tara was born from an affair King Markov (Brion's father) had with an unnamed American woman. Fearing scandal, the king sent Tara to be raised in the United States. Unbeknownst to Geo-Force and her fellow Titans, Terra is secretly a spy working for Deathstroke.

Several weeks later, Terra betrays the Titans for Deathstroke. In the ensuing battle with the Titans, Terra kills herself while trying to bury the Titans alive. At first, the Titans do not tell Geo-Force of her betrayal, letting him think that she has died a hero. However, Batman later reveals the truth to Geo-Force, which leaves him even more heartbroken. Geo-Force assumes a new green and gold costume to distance himself from Terra.

=== The Outsiders ===
After the Outsiders split with Batman, they are privately funded by Markovia, with Geo-Force as leader. Around this time, the sovereignty of Markovia again comes under threat. Geo-Force discovers that Psycho-Pirate, posing as Baron Bedlam, is attempting to conquer the country. The Outsiders and Infinity, Inc. join forces to stop Psycho-Pirate and leave on good terms.

Brion has a one-night stand with Looker when the team is stranded on a desert island. The move strains the relationship between Brion and his girlfriend Denise Howard, as well as Looker's relationship with her husband. Brion and Looker agree to remain platonic friends afterward.

The United States government withdraws any foreign aid from Markovia until the secret identities of the Outsiders are publicized. King Gregor, Brion's older brother, is murdered before he can make a decision. Brion becomes king, but he is forced to abdicate and is imprisoned when his sister-in-law, Iona (Gregor's wife), reveals she is pregnant. Helga Jace is revealed to have been an ally of the Manhunters and the culprit behind Gregor's murder. When Jace attempts to attack Metamorpho, her weapon generates a surge that kills them both. This, along with a second battle with the descendants of teammate Looker, which results in Looker being temporarily stripped of her powers and Halo left injured and comatose, causes the Outsiders to disband.

In the early 1990s, the Outsiders were revived with former Outsiders Geo-Force, Katana, Halo, and Looker joined by new heroes Faust, Technocrat and Wylde. Geo-Force is framed for the murder of Markovia's queen Iona and forced to go on the run.

Brion and the new Terra awaiting the results of the DNA test.

During this time, another Terra appears as part of the Team Titans, who originate from the future. This new Terra claims to have been a normal girl who was genetically altered to possess Terra's appearance and powers. Geo-Force's first attempt to talk to her meets with failure when he accidentally gets swept up in a rock column she has created during a loud party. He finds her again at the Titans headquarters. After a brief fight with her friends, he manages to sit down with her. The new Terra convinces him she is not his sister. The rogue Markovian scientists attack with the intention of forcibly duplicating Terra's powers. Geo-Force and the other Titans rescue her. Further revelations imply that this Terra is in fact from their time, when the original Terra's grave is dug up and her corpse is missing from her coffin.

Brion invites Terra to live in Markovia, which she accepts, as her group of Titans is disbanding. In Markovia, scientists conduct a DNA test in the hopes of discovering if Terra is Geo-Force's sister. Terra is afraid of finding out the results, fearful that she may be a villainous traitor. When the test results come back positive, Brion lies to Terra, telling her that the results are negative.

=== Justice League of America ===
While sailing in his yacht off the coast of Greece, Geo-Force suddenly loses control over his powers. This sudden increase in power is revealed to have been caused by Deathstroke, who blackmails Geo-Force into becoming a double agent for him in exchange for his powers being restored to normal.

The scheme falls apart when Lex Luthor organizes a new incarnation of the Injustice League and captures the Justice League. While a prisoner, Geo-Force is tortured by Gorilla Grodd. While recovering from his injuries, Geo-Force is "traded" to Batman's latest incarnation of the Outsiders, much to Geo-Force's dismay and, ultimately, acceptance.

In the one-shot DC Universe: Last Will and Testament, Geo-Force confronts Deathstroke at the same alley and building complex where Deathstroke's son Joseph had his throat slit. Geo-Force slits his own throat in the same manner as Joseph, which distracts Deathstroke and allows Geo-Force to stab him. Geo-Force loses a large amount of blood, but his powers prevent him from feeling pain from the injury.

=== Blackest Night ===
Geo-Force is visited by his sister, who has been reanimated as a Black Lantern. Claiming to have been freed from the dark force that was controlling her, Tara begs Brion to kill her. However, this turns out to be a facade to feed on the Outsiders' emotions. Geo-Force turns Terra into a statue and her ring is destroyed by Halo.

=== Doomsday Clock ===
In the series "Doomsday Clock", Geo-Force appears as the leader of a new team of Outsiders, based out of Markovia, and has denied any knowledge of working with Batman before. As Superman confronts Doctor Manhattan, Geo-Force arrives with his Outsiders alongside the People's Heroes and the Doomed in an attempt to bring Superman in. Geo-Force tells Superman to do the right thing and cooperate. The fight is broken up when Manhattan undoes the experiment that erased the Justice Society of America and the Legion of Super-Heroes from history.

In Shadow War, Geo-Force disguises himself as Deathstroke and murders Ra's al Ghul. He did this to pit the real Deathstroke against Ra's' daughter, Talia al Ghul, against each other and get revenge on both Deathstroke for what he did to Terra, and Talia for hurting his country.

== Powers and abilities ==
All of Brion's powers are in some way related to the planet Earth. He can manipulate the Earth's gravitational field to make an object heavier ("plus-gravity") or lighter ("null-gravity"). He can project scorching lava blasts in imitation of terrestrial volcanoes. By using his null-gravity power on himself, coupled with lava blasts for propulsion, Geo-Force can fly at great speeds for short periods of time. Geo-Force is able to turn organic material to earthen mineral with a touch.

Geo-Force possesses enhanced strength, speed and durability. He once used his gravity manipulation powers to enhance his own super-strength, strengthening him sufficiently enough to fight Superman on equal footing.

Due to his connection to the earth, Geo-Force does not require food, sleep, or air to survive. He is at his strongest when he is firmly planted on the ground and deteriorates if he is out of contact with the earth for long periods of time.

== Other versions ==
An alternate timeline version of Brion Markov appears in Flashpoint. This version is the king of Markovia. He is later captured by Aquaman, who harnesses his abilities to destroy western Europe.

== In other media ==
=== Television ===
- Geo-Force appears in the teaser for the Batman: The Brave and the Bold episode "Requiem for a Scarlet Speedster!", voiced by Hunter Parrish. This version is a member of the Outsiders.
- Two characters based on Brion Markov / Geo-Force appear in media set in the Arrowverse:
  - Dr. Brion Markov appears in the Arrow episode "Darkness on the Edge of Town", portrayed by Eric Floyd. This version is a human Unidac Industries scientist who created a device that can manipulate seismic activity. Malcolm Merlyn hires him to weaponize the device before murdering Markov and his staff so Merlyn can use the device on a crime-infested Starling City district called the Glades as part of his "Undertaking".
  - An Americanized adaptation of Geo-Force appears in Black Lightning, portrayed by Jahking Guillory. This version is Brandon Marshall, a student at Garfield High alongside Jennifer Pierce. Early in the third season, he reveals his metahuman status to her and how Helga Jace killed his mother, Helen, in her experiments before occasionally working with Pierce to repel a Markovian invasion. Near the end of the season, he learns Helen was a Markovian and his father had the same geokinetic abilities as him. In response, Marshall keeps Jace in his apartment to gain information about him.
- Brion Markov / Geo-Force appears in Young Justice, voiced by Troy Baker. This version is the 17-year-old, fraternal, younger twin brother of Crown Prince Gregor Markov of Markovia. After his younger sister Tara is kidnapped by metahuman traffickers, Brion decides to activate his meta-gene so he can stop the traffickers and find her, only to be placed into a meta-activation tank against his will by Helga Jace and Simon Ecks. When his uncle Baron Bedlam tries to frame him for the murder of his parents, Brion confronts him, but lacks control of his powers. After Superboy defeats Bedlam, Gregor is forced to exile Brion from Markovia, but asks Superboy to take care of his brother in his place. Brion begins training with Superboy, Nightwing, Artemis, Halo, Black Lightning, and Forager to better control his abilities. He also enters a relationship with Halo and develops a friendship with Forager. Brion eventually reunites with Tara, though he and his allies are initially unaware of her alliance with the Light. Following this, Brion joins the Team, and later the Outsiders. While on a mission to Markovia to stop Bedlam once more, Brion learns of Tara's deceit. Though she defects to the Team's side, Zviad Baazovi secretly manipulates Brion into killing Bedlam and usurping Gregor as king of Markovia on the Light's behalf. In the fourth season, Brion becomes the leader of the Infinitors.

=== Video games ===
Geo-Force appears as a character summon in Scribblenauts Unmasked: A DC Comics Adventure.

=== Miscellaneous ===
- Geo-Force appears in Teen Titans Go! #51.
- Geo-Force appears in Smallville Season 11 as a member of the Outsiders.
