= Baron Bedlam =

- Baron Bedlam and the Bad Samaritan in Batman and the Outsiders.

Publication information
- Publisher: DC Comics
- First appearance: Batman and the Outsiders #1 (August 1983)
- Created by: Mike W. Barr (writer); Jim Aparo (artist)

In-story information
- Alter ego: Baron Frederick DeLamb
- Abilities: Skilled fighter and tactician Formerly: Superhuman strength, endurance, and durability; Flight; Lava blasts; Earth manipulation

Baron Bedlam (Baron Frederick DeLamb) is a supervillain appearing in American comic books published by DC Comics. The character first appeared in Batman and the Outsiders #1 (August 1983).

== Fictional character biography ==
Baron Bedlam was originally Frederick DeLamb (Bedlam being an anagram of his last name). DeLamb's father, a minor government official in the kingdom of Markovia, was installed as a puppet ruler by the Nazis during World War II. At the end of the war, American forces helped the Markov family reclaim the throne. DeLamb escaped, but his father was hanged by the mob.

Frederick DeLamb, taking the name Baron Bedlam, gains the support of the Soviet army and the mysterious political manipulator Bad Samaritan. Bedlam murders Markovian king Viktor and seizes the throne, inciting a conflict between Markovia and the Soviet Union.

Markovia's crown prince, Brion Markov, with the aid of scientist Helga Jace, gives himself superpowers to stop the invasion. With the aid of other superheroes, a grouping under Batman's leadership that would soon call themselves the Outsiders, they infiltrate Markovia. Having heard of Jace's work in metahuman research, Bedlam undergoes a similar process to Brion and gains earth-manipulating abilities. In a confrontation between Bedlam's forces and Markovia's army, the Outsiders intervene, turning the tide of the battle.

Soon after, the Outsiders confront another aspect of Bedlam's forces, the Masters of Disaster. The two groups engage in a prolonged battle. In the meantime, Bad Samaritan discovers that Bedlam has cloned Adolf Hitler. However, Hitler's clone is distressed by the actions of the original Hitler and does not intend to continue his legacy. The Hitler clone commits suicide, with his body being found by the Outsiders. Shortly afterward, Geo-Force kills Bedlam by decapitating him.

Following his death, Bedlam is impersonated by Psycho-Pirate. He manipulates Wilhelm Vittings, who is running to become prime minister of Markovia, in an attempt to gain power and overthrow the royal family of Markovia. The real Bedlam later appears alive as one of several villains recruited by Sonar to battle Justice League Europe.

== Powers and abilities ==
Baron Bedlam is a skilled fighter and tactician, and possesses vast financial resources. He temporarily possessed earth-manipulating abilities similar to Geo-Force, but lost them due to not being Markovian royalty.

== In other media ==
Baron Bedlam appears in Young Justice, voiced by Nolan North. This version is a metahuman with a durable stone-like body, the maternal uncle of Markovian princes Gregor and Brion Markov, and the head of a secret metahuman trafficking syndicate. He hires Jaculi to murder Markovia's royal family, succeeding in killing King Viktor and Queen Illona. However, he is defeated and killed by Brion.
