= Looker (character) =

DC Comics character

- Looker as depicted in Batman and the Outsiders (vol. 2) #9 (September 2008).

Publication information
- Publisher: DC Comics
- First appearance: (As Emily Briggs) Batman & the Outsiders #25 (September 1985) (As Looker) The Outsiders #1 (November 1985)
- Created by: Mike W. Barr (writer); Alan Davis (artist)

In-story information
- Alter ego: Emily Briggs
- Species: Vampire
- Team affiliations: Outsiders; Batman Incorporated
- Notable aliases: Lia Briggs
- Abilities: Telepathy; Telekinesis; Psychometry; Enhanced metabolism; Vapor transformation; Control over vermin

Looker (Emily "Lia" Briggs) is a superhero appearing in American comic books published by DC Comics. The character's first appearance was in 1985 in Batman & the Outsiders #25.

Looker appears in the Arrowverse series Black Lightning, portrayed by Sofia Vassilieva.

== Publication history ==
Looker made her first appearance in Batman & the Outsiders #25 (September 1985) and was created by Mike W. Barr and Jim Aparo.

Barr spoke in an open letter to fans on the creation of the character, stating:

When it was decided to put The Outsiders into their own book, a new member was obviously called for. I began kicking around ideas, and conceived a female character who possessed mental powers (an area covered by none of the other outsiders). She would also be very beautiful. The name looker suggested itself, and the character virtually fell into place of course you cant have a costumed character without a costume, so I got out some fashion magazines (The name Looker suggesting a glitzy, high fashion kind of approach) and cobbled a design together inspired by an actual dress and an actual swimsuit...

== Fictional character biography ==
=== Emily Briggs ===
Emily Briggs was a mild-mannered bank teller who lived with her husband in Gotham City before being kidnapped by the people of Abyssia, a lost underground civilization, and rescued by the Outsiders. Emily eventually learns that she is part Abyssian and gains superpowers after Halley's Comet passes by Earth, the process of which also makes her extremely physically attractive and self-confident.

=== Joining the Outsiders ===
Looker's first costume on the cover of Outsiders #31.

After leaving Abyssia to its people, Emily returns to the United States. Emily goes on to join the Outsiders as Looker after rescuing them from the Masters of Disaster. She had a short affair with team leader Geo-Force, but they eventually decide to break up.

Some time later, Looker receives a call for help from Abyssia and discovers that a despot has conquered it. In the ensuing battle, Looker loses her powers. Shortly afterwards, Geo-Force disbands the Outsiders. Through unknown circumstances, Looker would regain her powers. She is targeted by the Mud Pack, a group of various villains using the Clayface name.

=== Becoming a vampire ===
Looker's second costume, from Outsiders (vol. 2) #1.

When Geo-Force's homeland Markovia is overrun by vampire forces, Looker and the Outsiders go to confront them. Roderick, the leader of the vampire, becomes smitten with Looker and transforms her into a vampire, intending to marry her. After the transformation into a vampire, Looker's existing powers were joined by some new abilities. Looker's metahuman abilities suppress some of the traditional vampiric weaknesses such as vulnerability to sunlight.

=== Retirement ===
Lia at some point after this may have cut her ties with her vampire coven; she also became more independent in her choice of actions. She became one of the hosts of the television program The Scene alongside Vicki Vale, Tawny Young, and Linda Park.

Looker's New 52 look. Textless cover to National Comics: Looker #1. Art by Guillem March.

Looker later resurfaces to help Batman, having become a model and no longer possessing an immunity to sunlight. She now lives alone in a mansion in Gotham City filled with framed photos of herself taken during her previous modeling days.

Lia reappears later where it is revealed she has been publicly moonlighting in her modeling career while secretly killing members of a powerful vampire clan. The clan retaliates by hiring a vampire hunter to assassinate her. The assassin is unsuccessful as Lia was able to destroy him before leaving for Markovia to help Geo-Force fight off an invasion.

=== The New 52 ===
In September 2011, The New 52 rebooted DC's continuity. In this new timeline, Looker is introduced once again as an agent of Batman Incorporated alongside Halo and Metamorpho. After being caught in an explosion and presumed dead, the three use their status to do undercover jobs for Batman.

== Powers and abilities ==
Looker possesses the full spectrum of psionic abilities: telepathy, telekinesis, psychometry, enhanced metabolism, mind-control, psionic energy blasts, levitation, the creation of force shields, remote vision, and enhanced healing. Due to her vampiric nature, Looker can turn into vapor, but only at night. She also has the vampiric ability to mentally command vermin such as bugs. Her psionic powers suppress the vampire weakness to sunlight; however, she still requires blood as other vampires do. Changes in The New 52 continuity have left her as susceptible to sunlight as other vampires.

In her earlier appearances, Looker is also a lucid dreamer.

Her original costume was manufactured from Abyssian fabric that is partially invisible.

== Other versions ==
An alternate universe version of Looker appears in National Comics: Looker. This version is a supermodel who became a vampire after a one-night stand.

== In other media ==
=== Television ===
- A villainous incarnation of Looker appears in Black Lightning, portrayed by Sofia Vassilieva. This version is a white supremacist who can control people via a silver metallic substance. Settling in the rural area of South Freeland 30 years ago, she uses her ability to control the white population of South Freeland, or "Sange", while reducing the black population, or "Perdi", to a form of slavery. After discovering what she has done, Black Lightning and Thunder defeat her and transfer her to A.S.A. custody. In the fourth season, Looker escapes from the A.S.A. during the Markovians' invasion of Freeland and allies with Tobias Whale. However, Painkiller finds and defeats Looker before transferring her to the FBI's custody in exchange for confessing to her involvement with Whale.
- Lia Briggs appears in Young Justice, voiced by Grey Griffin. This version is a Scottish teenager who was captured by the League of Shadows before being rescued by and joining the Outsiders.

=== Film ===
Model Citizen as depicted in Justice League: Crisis on Two Earths

An alternate reality incarnation of Looker named Model Citizen appears in Justice League: Crisis on Two Earths, voiced by Kari Wuhrer. She is a member of the Crime Syndicate who serves under Owlman.

=== Video games ===
Looker appears as a character summon in Scribblenauts Unmasked: A DC Comics Adventure.
