= Jim Aparo =

American comic book artist (1932–2005)

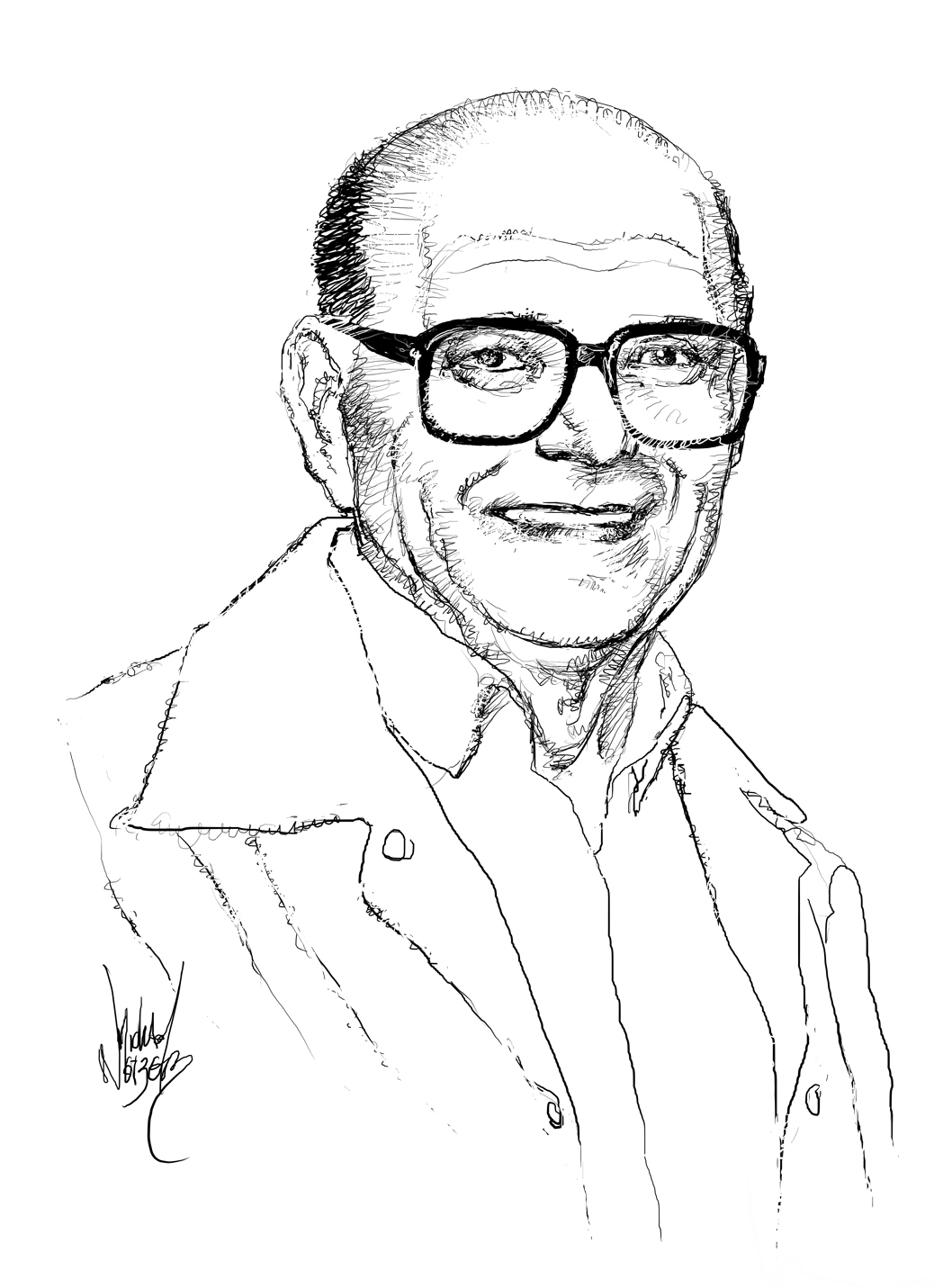
- Jim Aparo by Michael Netzer
- Born: James N. Aparo; August 24, 1932 New Britain, Connecticut, U.S.
- Died: July 19, 2005 (aged 72) Southington, Connecticut, U.S.
- Areas: Penciller, Inker, Letterer
- Notable works: Adventure Comics (Spectre); Aquaman; The Brave and the Bold; Detective Comics; The Untold Legend of the Batman
- Awards: The Shazam Award in 1972; The Inkpot Award in 1993; Will Eisner Hall of Fame in 2019

James N. Aparo (/əˈpɛroʊ/; August 24, 1932 – July 19, 2005) was an American comic book artist, best known for his DC Comics work from the late 1960s through the 1990s, including on the characters Batman, Aquaman, and the Spectre, along with famous stories such as "A Death in the Family" and "KnightFall".

== Early life ==
Jim Aparo was born on August 24, 1932 in New Britain, Connecticut. Aparo took art classes at New Britain High School while also taking courses at Hartford Art School. Aparo was primarily self-taught by studying and copying comic books. Growing up and taking inspiration from characters such as Superman, Batman, and Captain Marvel. Aparo was influenced by artists such as Alex Raymond and Milton Caniff. Aparo started his comic career later than most artists around the time working in advertising first while sending his art to various comic book publishers. On a summer vacation in Charlton, Aparo met Dick Giordano (the future executive editor of DC Comics) who saw potential in his work.

== Career ==
=== Charlton Comics ===
He attempted to enter the comic book profession in his early 20s, approaching EC Comics, which declined to hire him. He then worked in the advertising industry in Connecticut, often drawing fashion illustrations for newspaper advertisements. He continued to pursue a career in comic books and comic strips while working in advertising.

His first break in the comics field was with the comic strip Stern Wheeler, written by Ralph Kanna, which was published in 1963 in a Hartford, Connecticut, newspaper for less than a year. In 1966, editor Dick Giordano at Charlton Comics hired him as a comic book artist, where his first assignment was a humorous character called "Miss Bikini Luv" in "Go-Go Comics."

Over the next few years at Charlton, Aparo drew stories in many genres—Westerns, science fiction, romance, horror, mystery, and suspense. Most of his work was for standalone stories in anthology titles, but he also drew the historical-adventure feature "Thane of Bagarth" in the comic book Hercules; the superheroine feature "Nightshade" in Captain Atom; the science fiction/Western/comedy backup "Wander" in Cheyenne Kid; and the comic book adaptation of the comic strip The Phantom.

Aparo was paid $15 to $20 per page at his time at Charlton Comics.

Aparo was one of the few artists in mainstream comics at that time to serve as penciller, inker, and letterer for all of his work.

=== DC Comics ===
In the late 1960s, Dick Giordano left Charlton for an editorial position at DC Comics and offered Aparo a job drawing the Aquaman comic book. After an initial issue (#40) for which Aparo provided only pencil art, Aparo resumed producing pencils, inks, and letters for most issues of the series until its cancellation. Aparo continued for a time to provide art to Charlton for The Phantom, alternating between the two series month by month as both series were being released on a bimonthly basis at the time.

Eventually Aparo resigned his assignment on The Phantom and worked almost exclusively for the remainder of his career for DC Comics. Aparo's next series assignment at DC was Phantom Stranger. After Aquaman was cancelled, the bimonthly frequency of Phantom Stranger was insufficient to fill his typical production rate of one page per day, so DC assigned him several short jobs such as mystery stories for House of Mystery and House of Secrets.

In 1971, Aparo was assigned a fill-in job as the artist for The Brave and the Bold #98 (Oct.–Nov. 1971). This series routinely featured team-ups of DC's Batman with other characters, in this case, the Phantom Stranger. As the regular artist on the Phantom Stranger's own series, Aparo was considered an appropriate choice. Murray Boltinoff, the editor of The Brave and the Bold, soon assigned Aparo the regular artistic responsibilities for the series (beginning with #100), which he continued until its cancellation with issue #200, missing only a few issues. Aparo even "co-starred" as himself in The Brave and the Bold #124 (January 1976).

During the more than 10 years as the artist for The Brave and the Bold, its bimonthly frequency permitted Aparo to do many other significant works for DC (it became monthly in November 1978). In addition to numerous covers, he served as the regular artist for a notorious series starring a ruthless avenging ghost called the Spectre, which ran in Adventure Comics, and which in 2005 was collected in a trade paperback edition (ISBN 978-1-4012-0474-7). He also provided art for a revival of Aquaman in both Adventure Comics and a continuation of the previously-cancelled Aquaman. He was assigned the solo Batman series in Detective Comics as of issue #437 (Oct.–Nov. 1973) for a rather short time and drew occasional stories for anthology series. Aparo and writer Len Wein introduced Sterling Silversmith in Detective Comics #446 (April 1975). He drew The Untold Legend of the Batman, the first Batman miniseries, in 1980, inking John Byrne's pencils in the first issue and providing full art for the second and third issues. Aparo was one of the artists on the double-sized Justice League of America #200 (March 1982).

When The Brave and the Bold was cancelled in 1983, it was replaced with a series called Batman and the Outsiders, a superhero team led by Batman. This series, which Aparo co-created with writer Mike W. Barr, would be described by DC Comics writer and executive Paul Levitz as being "a team series more fashionable to 1980s audiences." The Masters of Disaster were among the supervillains created by Barr and Aparo for the series. It would run for several years, continuing with a Baxter paper spinoff titled The Outsiders that did not include Batman and introduced Looker. For the final few issues, DC began to request that Aparo provide only pencils, and a long and nearly unbroken string of Aparo inking and lettering his own work came mostly to an end.

The scene from Batman #428 (1988), in which Batman discovers that Jason Todd is dead

Aparo's next major work consisted of pencils for Batman and Detective Comics, where his art was almost always inked by Mike DeCarlo. Aparo returned to the Batman title with issue #414 (Dec. 1987) in collaboration with writer Jim Starlin. One of their first storylines for the title was "Ten Nights of The Beast" in issues #417–420 (March–June 1988) which introduced the KGBeast. Perhaps the most notable product of this period remains "A Death in the Family" (Batman #426–429, 1988–1989), depicting the death of Jason Todd (Robin). The "A Lonely Place of Dying" storyline crossed over with The New Titans title and introduced Tim Drake as the new Robin. Aparo continued to draw Batman stories in Detective and Batman until the early 1990s. During this time, he was the regular artist on Batman when Bane broke Bruce Wayne's back during the "KnightFall" storyline. In 1992, Aparo returned to do pencils, inks, and lettering for his Batman stories, but was soon returned to contributing only pencil art.

Also that year, Aparo was given his last regular series assignment for DC as pencil artist for Green Arrow issues #81–100. He and writer Kelley Puckett co-created Connor Hawke, the son of Green Arrow. Following that assignment, Aparo's work appeared infrequently, when Aparo was mostly assigned occasional Batman-related stories and covers in miniseries and specials. His published work in the late 1990s and early 2000s include a Batman Annual inked by former Marvel Comics mainstay Sal Buscema, a G.C.P.D. miniseries, a Speed Force Special featuring the Flash, an issue of a Deadman miniseries that revisited his "Death in the Family" story, and a single page of Green Lantern/Superman: Legend of the Green Flame written by Neil Gaiman in which he had a final opportunity to draw the Phantom Stranger for publication.

His final work for DC during his life was the cover of the trade paperback Batman in the Eighties, published in 2004. In 2006, previously-unpublished Aparo art depicting the unused, alternate ending of the storyline "A Death in the Family," in which the Jason Todd Robin lives instead of dies, appeared in Batman Annual #25.

== Death ==
Aparo died on July 19, 2005, at his home in Southington, Connecticut. At least one report attributed the cause of death to "a long battle with cancer", but his family's formal announcement said his death came from "complications relating to a recent illness". DC Comics ran an Aparo "In Memoriam" page in Batman #644 (Oct. 2005) and Detective Comics #811 (Nov. 2005).

== Awards ==
Aparo was inducted into the Will Eisner Hall of Fame in 2019 and received the Shazam Award for "Best Individual Short Story (Dramatic)" in 1972 for "The Demon Within" in House of Mystery #201 with John Albano. He received the Inkpot Award in 1993.

== Bibliography ==
Comics work (interior pencil art) includes:

=== Charlton Comics ===
- Captain Atom (Nightshade) #87–89 (Aug. 1967–Dec. 1967)
- Career Girl Romances #40 (June 1967)
- Charlton Premiere #4 (May 1968)
- Cheyenne Kid #66–71 (May 1968–March 1969) [Wander]
- Ghost Manor #77 (Nov. 1984)
- Ghostly Tales #65–68, 71–72, 74–76, 79, 81, 137, 141–142, 146, 149, 153, 164 (Feb. 1968–Dec. 1983)
- Go-Go #5–9 (Feb. 1967–Oct. 1967)
- Gunfighter #52, 83 (Oct. 1967 and March 1984)
- Hercules: Adventures of the Man-God #1–10 (1968–1969)
- I Love You #67 (April 1967)
- Love Diary #62, 66 (Oct. 1969 and May 1970)
- The Many Ghosts of Doctor Graves #4–5, 7–8, 17, 66, 69 (1967–1981)
- Peter Cannon, Thunderbolt #60 (1967) [Prankster]
- The Phantom #31–34, 36–38 (1969–1970)
- Romantic Story #94 (July 1968)
- Scary Tales #22 (Oct, 1980)
- Secret Agent #10 (Oct. 1967) [Tiffany Sinn]
- Space Adventures #2, 4 (July and Nov. 1968)
- Space Adventures Presents U.F.O. #60 (Oct. 1967)
- Strange Suspense Stories vol. 2 #1–2, 4 (Oct. 1967–Nov. 1968)

=== DC Comics ===
- Action Comics #642 (1989)
- Adventure Comics (Adventurers' Club) #426–427; (Spectre) #431–433, 435–436, 439-440 (full art); #437–438 (inks over Ernie Chan); (Aquaman) #441–452; (Deadman) #459–461, 464 (1973–1979)
- All-Star Western (vol. 2) #5 (1971)
- Aquaman #40–59 (1968–1978)
- Aquaman (vol. 3) #52 (flashback sequence) (1999)
- Azrael Annual #3 (1997)
- Batman #414–420, 426–435, 440–448, 450–451, 480–483, 486–491, 494–500, 533–534, 558, 560–562 (1987–1999)
- Batman Annual #24–25 (2000–2006)
- Batman Family #13–16 (covers only) (1977–1978)
- Black Canary #11 (cover only) (1993)
- Batman and the Outsiders #1–9, 11–12, 16–20 (full art); Annual #1 (inks) (1983–1985)
- Batman: Blackgate Isle of Men (1998)
- Batman: Brotherhood of the Bat (1996)
- The Batman Chronicles #7, 14 (1997–1998)
- Batman Family #17 (Batman, Robin, and Huntress) (1978)
- Batman: GCPD #1–4 (miniseries) (1996)
- Batman: Legends of the Dark Knight #142–145, Annual #1 (1991–2001)
- Batman Secret Files and Origins (1997)
- Batman: Shadow of the Bat #61, 68 (1997)
- The Brave and the Bold #98, 100–102, 104–136, 138–145, 147, 149–152, 154–155, 157–162, 168–170, 173–178, 180–182, 184, 186–189, 191–193, 195–196, 200 (full art); #148 (inks over Joe Staton) (1971–1983)
- Batman Villains Secret Files and Origins (1998)
- The Best of DC #26, 30 (1982)
- Celebrate the Century Super Heroes Stamp Album #1–2, 4 (1998)
- DC Special Blue Ribbon Digest #23 (cover only) (1982)
- DC Special Series #8 (1978)
- DC Super-Stars #7, 14, 18 (covers only) (1976–1978)
- DCU Holiday Bash #1 (1996)
- Deadman: Dead Again #2 of 5 (miniseries) (2001)
- Detective Comics #437–438, 444–446, 500, 625–632, 638–643, 716, 719, 722, 724 (1973–1998)
- The Flash #311 (cover only) (1982)
- Ghosts #1 (1971)
- Green Arrow #0, 81–88, 91–95, 98–100, 109, 123 (full art); #96 (inks over Michael Netzer) (1993–1997)
- Green Lantern/Superman: Legend of the Green Flame (2000)
- House of Mystery #192, 201, 209 (1971–1972)
- House of Secrets #93, 97, 105 (1971–1973)
- Jonah Hex #76 (cover only) (1983)
- Justice League of America #200 (among other artists) (1982)
- Legion of Super-Heroes #282–283 (1981–1982)
- Man-Bat #1–2 (covers only) (1975–1976)
- Metal Men #53–56 (covers only) (1977–1978)
- Mystery in Space #111 (1980)
- Outsiders #1–7, 9–14, 17–22, 25–26 (1985–1988)
- Outsiders vol. 2 #24 (cover only) (1995)
- Phantom Stranger (vol. 2) #7–26 (1969–1973)
- Secret Origins (vol. 2) #10 (Phantom Stranger) (1987)
- Secrets of Haunted House #6–7 (covers only) (1977)
- Showcase #94–96 (covers only) (1977)
- Silver Age: The Brave and the Bold (cover only) (2000)
- Spectre (vol. 3) #16 (1994)
- Speed Force #1 (The Flash/Kid Flash story) (1997)
- Steel #33 (1996)
- Superboy and the Ravers #8 (1997)
- Teen Titans #36 (Aqualad) (1971)
- Time Warp #1 (1979)
- The Unexpected #127, 132 (1971–1972)
- The Untold Legend of the Batman #1 (inks over John Byrne); #2–3 (miniseries) (1980)
- Weird Mystery Tales #4 (cover only) (1973)
- Weird War Tales #53, 105 (covers only) (1977–1981)
- Who's Who in the DC Universe #4–5, 11, 13–14 (1990–1991)
- Who's Who: The Definitive Directory of the DC Universe #2–3, 9–10, 12–13, 15, 18, 21, 23 (1985–1987)
- Who's Who: Update '88 #2 (1988)
- Witching Hour #25 (1972)
- World's Finest Comics #249–255, 257 (1978–1979)
- Wrath of the Spectre #4 (miniseries) (1988) (Note: Wrath of the Spectre was a four-issue miniseries published in 1988. Issues #1–3 reprint the character's run in Adventure Comics #431–440 (all but #434 and #437–439 drawn by Aparo), while issue #4 prints three stories that were written in 1975 and newly illustrated for this miniseries by Aparo again.)

=== Marvel Comics ===
- Captain America #616 (2011) (Captain America Sketch from 1999)

=== Collections ===
- Legends of the Dark Knight: Jim Aparo
  - Vol. 1 collects The Brave and the Bold #98, 100–102, 104–122. 512 pages, April 2012, ISBN 978-1-4012-3375-4
  - Vol. 2 collects The Brave and the Bold #123–145 and 147–151, Detective Comics #437–438. 528 pages, October 2013, ISBN 978-1-4012-4296-1
  - Vol. 3 collects The Brave and the Bold #152, 154–155, 157–162, 168–179, 173–178, 180–182, Detective Comics #444–446, 448, 468–470, Batman Family #17, and various covers from those titles. 520 pages, August 2017 ISBN 978-1-4012-7161-9
- Batman: The Brave and the Bold—The Bronze Age Omnibus
  - Vol. 1 collects The Brave and the Bold #74–106. 904 pages, January 2017, ISBN 978-1-4012-6718-6
  - Vol. 2 collects The Brave and the Bold #110–156. 776 pages, September 2018, ISBN 978-1-4012-8167-0
  - Vol. 3 collects The Brave and the Bold #157–200. 904 pages, (publication date September 2021) ISBN 978-1-4012-9282-9
- Batman and the Outsiders
  - Vol. 1 collects The Brave and the Bold #200, Batman and the Outsiders #1–13, New Teen Titans #37. 368 pages, February 2017, ISBN 978-1-4012-6812-1
  - Vol. 2 collects Batman and the Outsiders Annual #1, Batman and the Outsiders #14–23. 312 pages, February 2018, ISBN 978-1-4012-7753-6
- The Phantom – The Complete Series: The Charlton Years Volume One
  - Collects The Phantom #30–38, which includes all Aparo stories. 224 pages, February 2012, ISBN 978-1-61345-006-2
- Jim Aparo's Complete The Phantom
  - Collects The Phantom #31–34, #36–38. Also, essays on Jim Aparo with original art. 192 pages, January 2017, ISBN 978-1-61345-110-6
- Aquaman: a Celebration of 75 Years
  - collects Adventure Comics #120, 174, 220, 260, 266, 269, 444, 452, and 475, Aquaman (vol. 1) #1, 18, 40, Aquaman (vol. 2) #3, Aquaman (vol. 3) #2, 34, Aquaman (vol. 4) #4, 17, Aquaman (vol. 5) #1, 43. 400 pages, October 2016, ISBN 978-1-4012-6446-8
- Aquaman: Death of A Prince
  - collects Adventure Comics #435–437, #441–455, Aquaman #57–63. 336 pages, July 2011, ISBN 978-1-4012-3113-2 with a reprint deluxe hardcover edition published February 2020 ISBN 978-1-77950-095-3
- Aquaman: The Search for Mera
  - collects Aquaman #40–48. 216 pages, November 2018, ISBN 978-1-4012-8522-7
- Aquaman: The Deadly Waters
  - collects Aquaman #49–56. 208 pages, August 2020, ISBN 978-1-77950-294-0
- Wrath of the Spectre
  - collects Adventure Comics #431–440, Wrath of the Spectre #1–4. 200 pages, June 2005, ISBN 978-1-4012-0474-7
- Deadman Book Four
  - collects DC Special Series #8, Adventure Comics #459–466, DC Comics Presents #24. 168 pages, January 2014, ISBN 978-1-4012-4324-1
- DC Universe by Len Wein
  - collects Phantom Stranger #20–24 (Aparo), Action Comics, DC Comics Presents and more. 384 pages, February 2019 ISBN 978-1-4012-8787-0
- The Joker The Bronze Age Omnibus
  - collects The Joker #1–10, Batman 251, 260, 286, 291–294, 321, 353, 365–366, and 400, The Brave and the Bold 111, 118, 129–130, 141, and 191, Detective Comics 475–476, 504, 526, and 532, Wonder Woman 280–283, DC Comics Presents 41 and 72, and more. Jim Aparo's art appears on 11 of the issues included, fully one fourth of the content, and his interior art is featured in all of The Brave and the Bold issues included. Furthermore, Aparo's rendition of the Joker is embossed in raised features on the back of the hardcover book. 832 pages, August 2019 ISBN 978-1-4012-9340-6
- The Spectre: The Wrath of the Spectre Omnibus
  - collects Showcase #60, 61, 64, The Brave & the Bold 72, 75, 116, 180, and 199, The Spectre 1–10, Adventure Comics 431–440, DC Comics Presents 29, Wrath of the Spectre #4, and Ghosts 97–99. Jim Aparo did all of the art in 7 of the 10 Adventure Comics issues, and 2 of The Brave and the Bold issues. He also inked the remaining Adventure Comics, and penciled 40 pages of art for the 1988 Wrath of the Spectre special editions, and illustrated the cover for The Brave and the Bold #199—which means his art is more than one third of the content of the omnibus. In addition, Aparo's art is used for both the cover of the book and the dustjacket, including the jacket flaps. 680 pages, September 2020 ISBN 978-1-77950-293-3
- Deadman Omnibus
  - collects Strange Adventures 205–216, The Brave & the Bold 79, 86, 104, and 133, Aquaman 50–52, Challengers of the Unknown 74, 84–87, Justice League of America 94, World's finest 223 and 227, The Phantom Stranger 33, 39–41 Superman Family 183, DC Superstars 18, DC Comics Presents 24, Adventure Comics 459–466, Detective Comics 500, Secret Origins 15, Deadman 1–4 (1986). Jim Aparo did interior art for six issues in the omnibus, and cover art for 10 other issues. 944 pages, December 2020 ISBN 978-1-77950-488-3
- The Phantom Stranger Omnibus
  - collects The Phantom Stranger 1–6 (1952), The Phantom Stranger 1–41 (1969), The Saga of the Swamp Thing 1–13, Who's Who: The Definitive Directory of the DC Universe 18, The Brave and the Bold 89, 98, 145, Showcase 80, Justice League of America 103, House of Secrets 150, DC Superstars 18, Secret Origins 10, and DC Comics Presents 25 and 72. 680 pages, May 2022 ISBN 978-1-77950-603-0

== Notes ==
Preceded by Nick Cardy	Aquaman artist 1968–1971 and 1977	Succeeded by Don Newton
Preceded by José Delbo	Phantom artist 1969–1970	Succeeded by Pat Boyette
Preceded by Bob Brown and Nick Cardy	The Brave and the Bold artist 1971–1983	Succeeded by n/a
Preceded by Kieron Dwyer	Batman artist 1987–1990	Succeeded by Kieron Dwyer
Preceded by Tom Mandrake	Batman artist 1992–1993	Succeeded by Mike Manley
