= List of Arrowverse cast members =

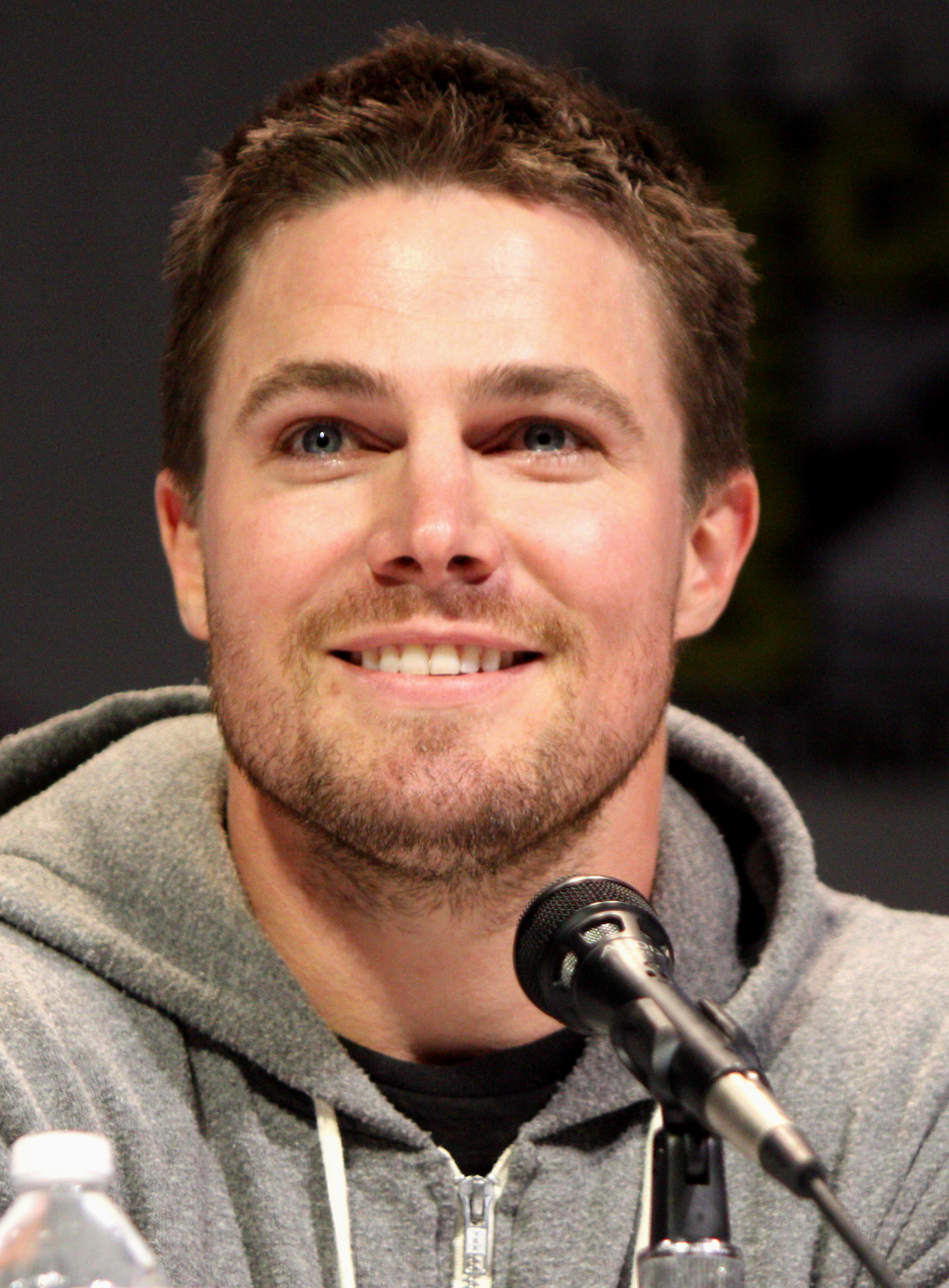
Stephen Amell

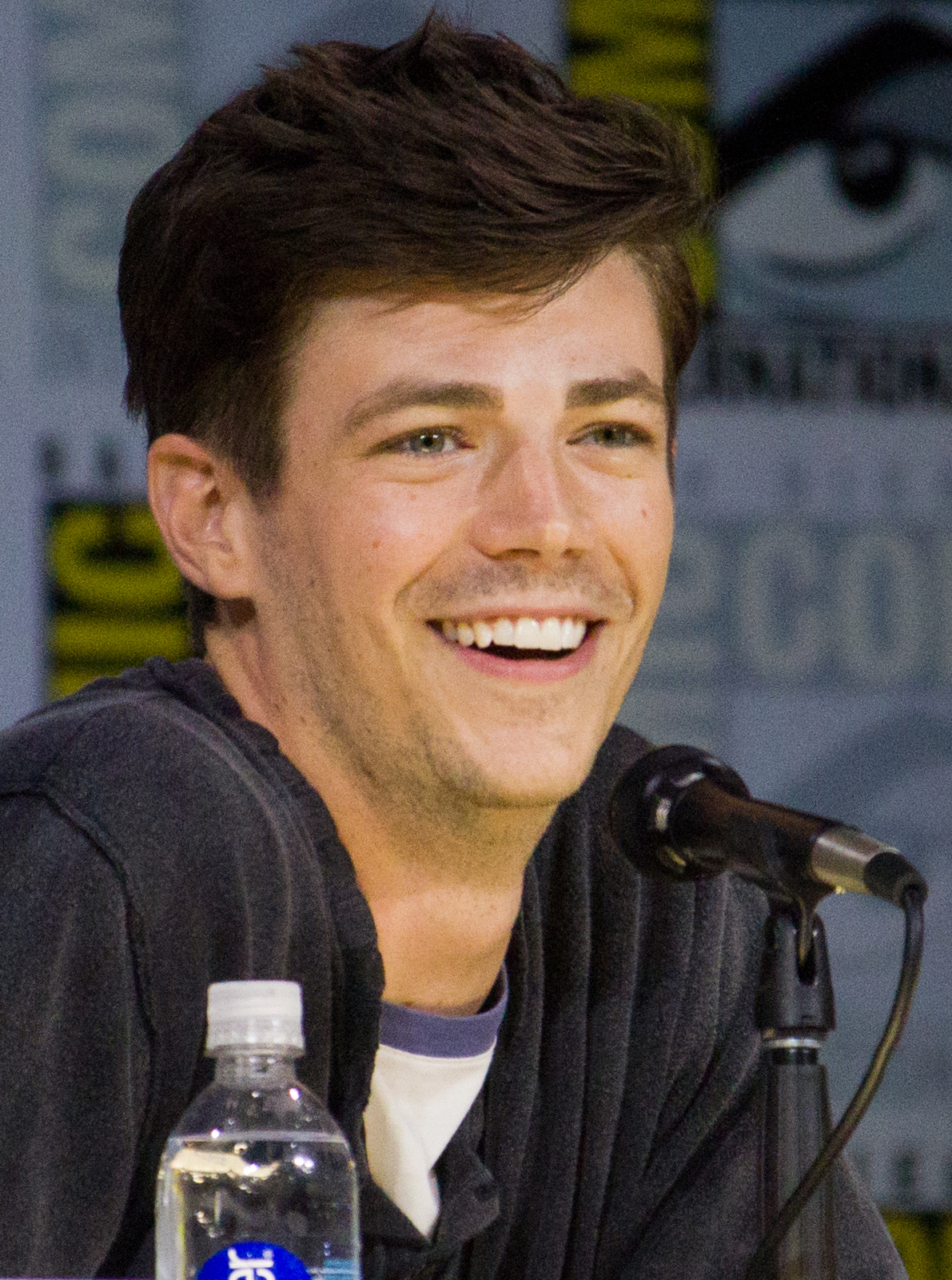
Grant Gustin

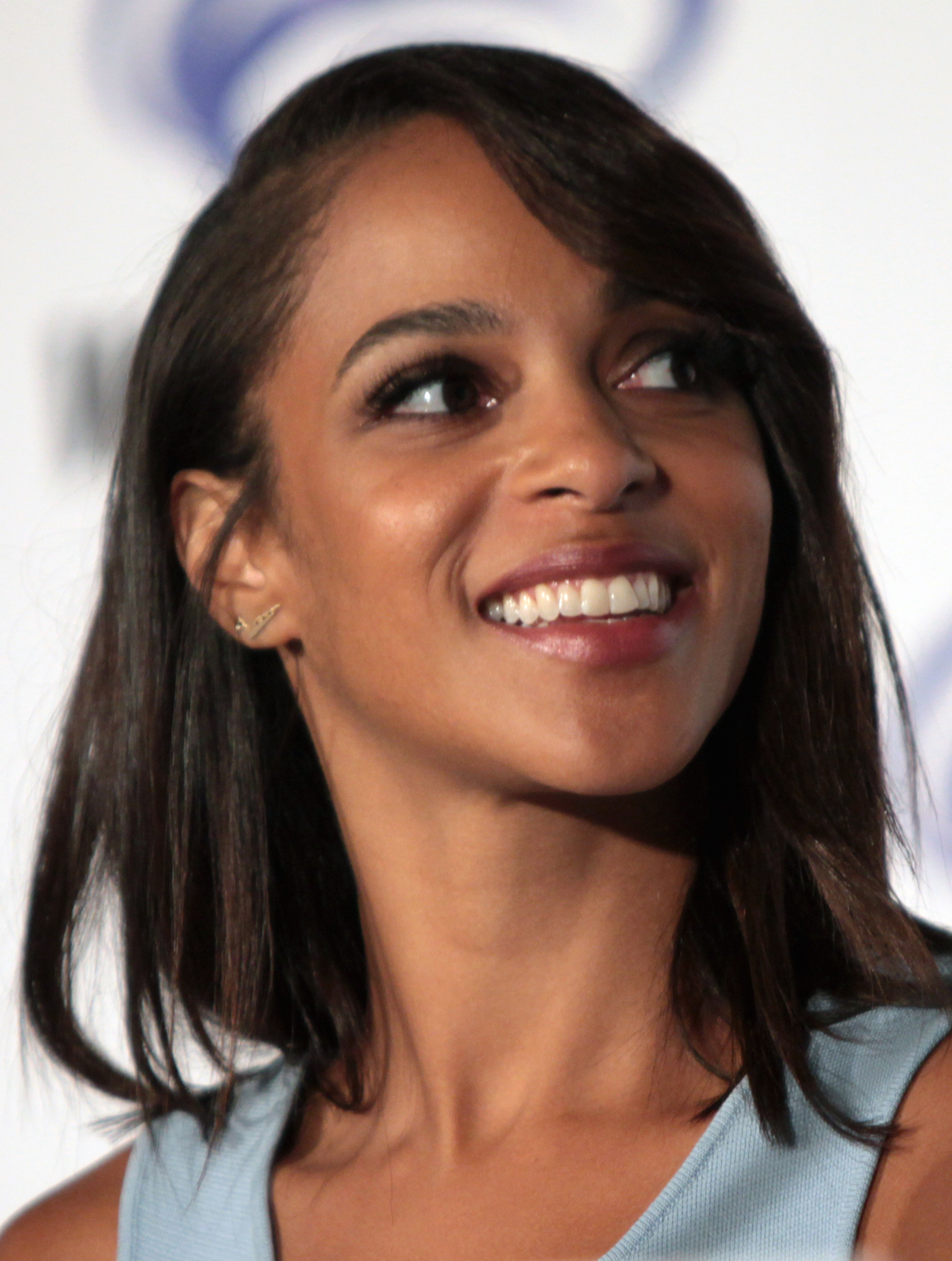
Megalyn Echikunwoke

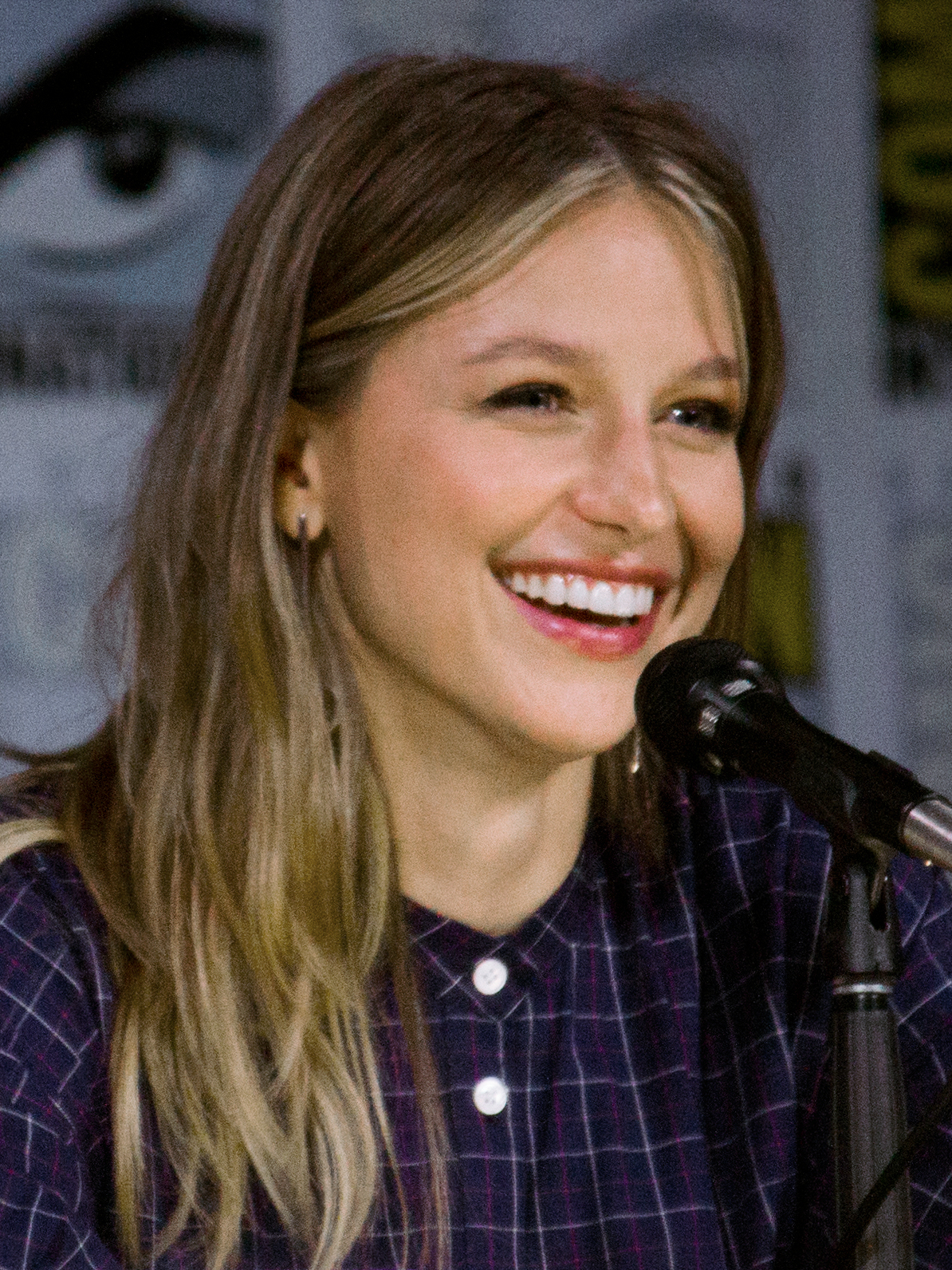
Melissa Benoist

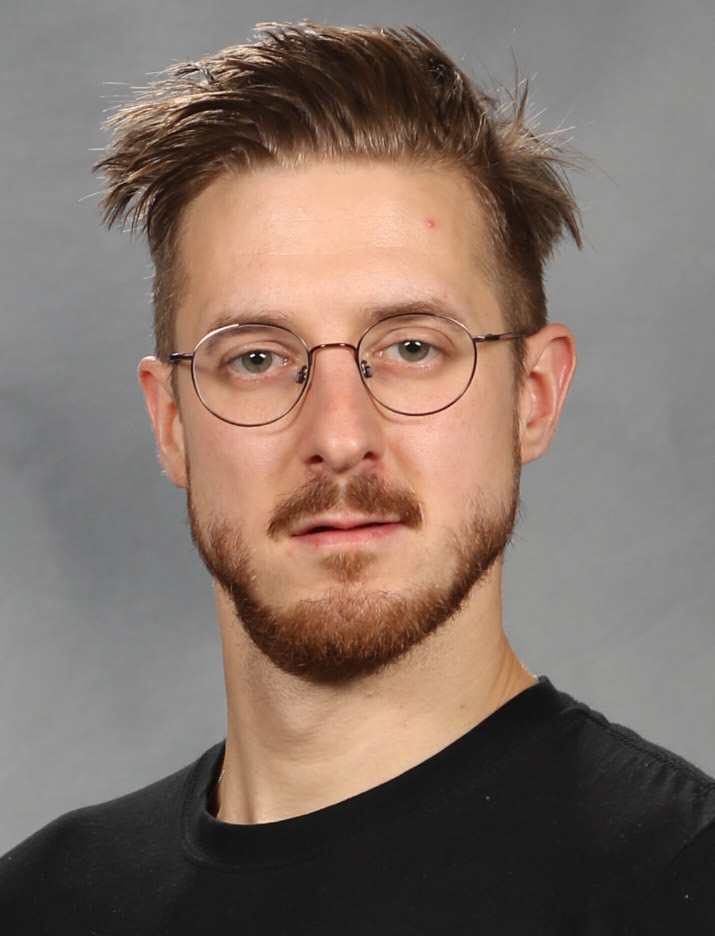
Arthur Darvill

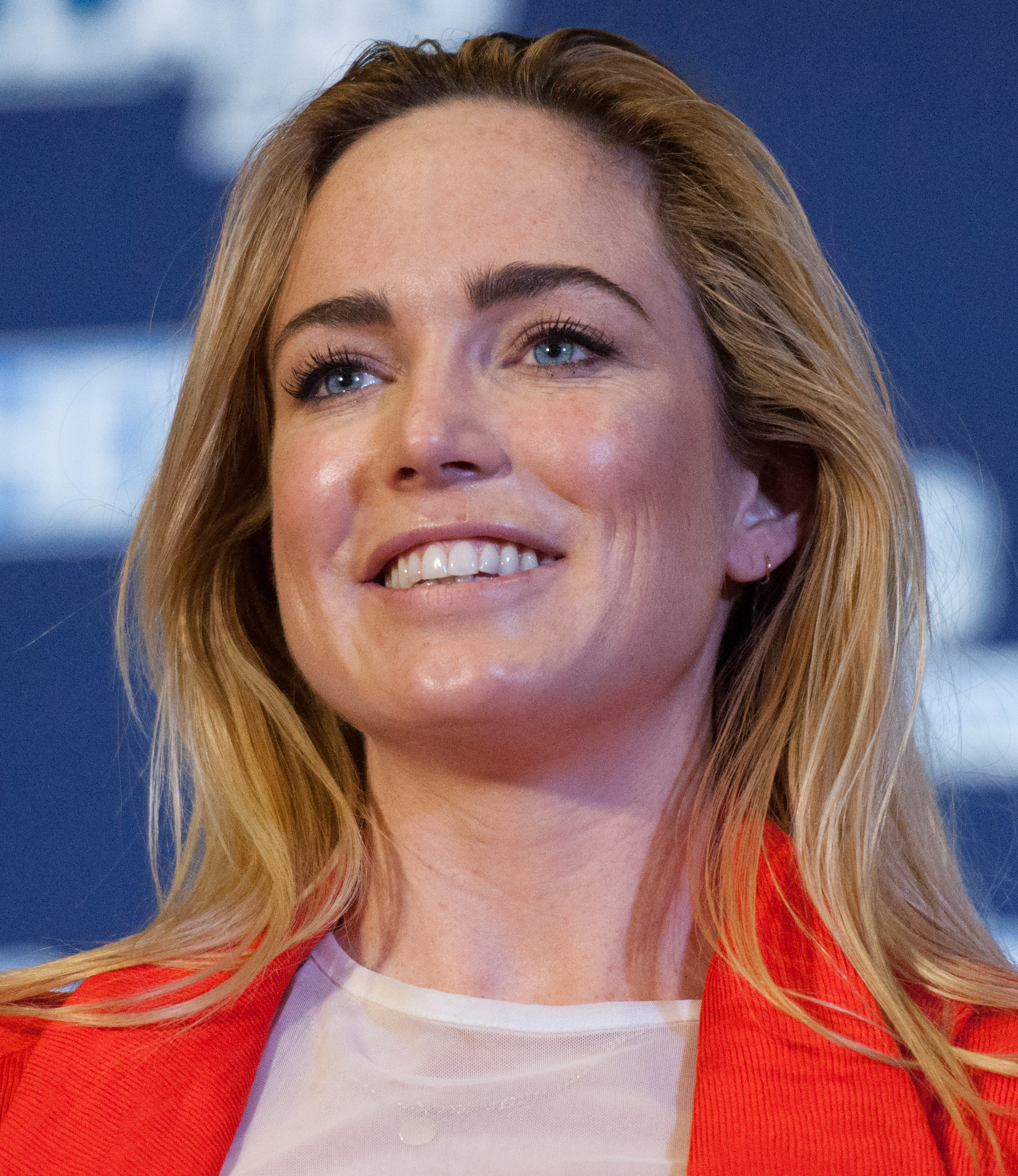
Caity Lotz

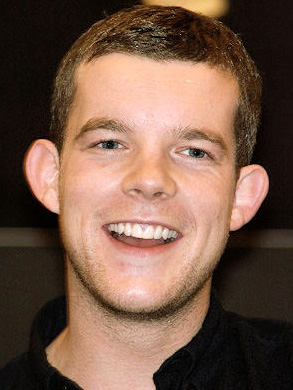
Russell Tovey

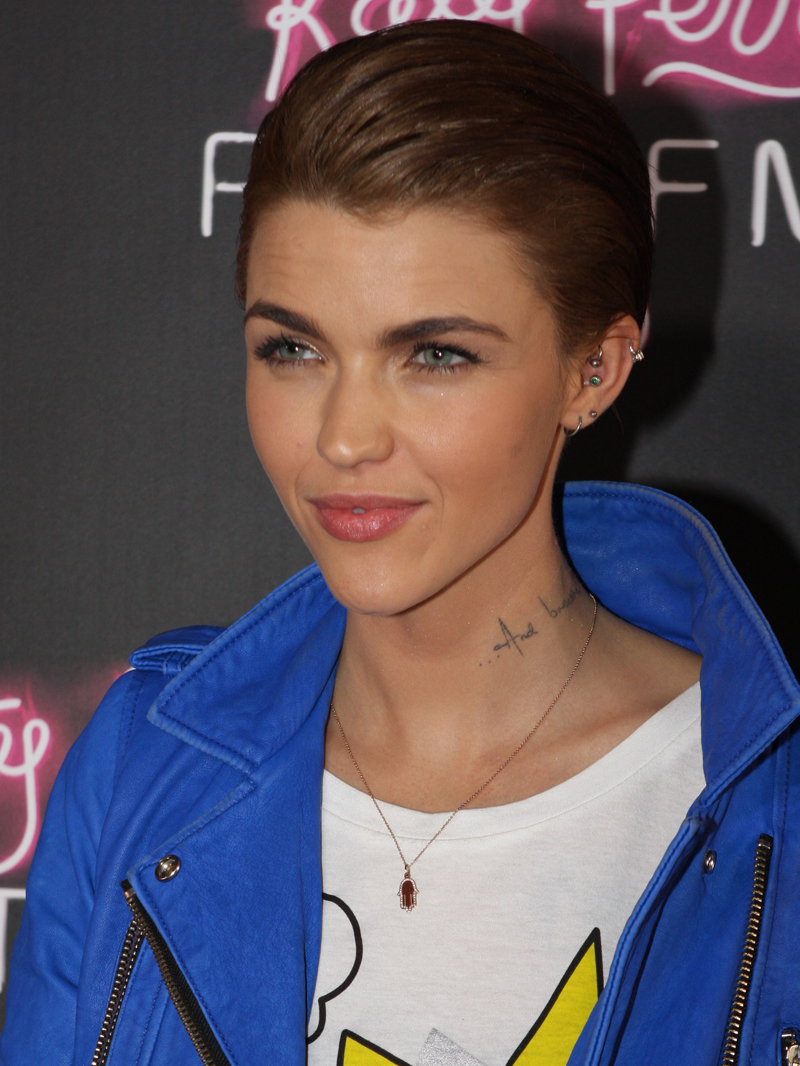
Ruby Rose

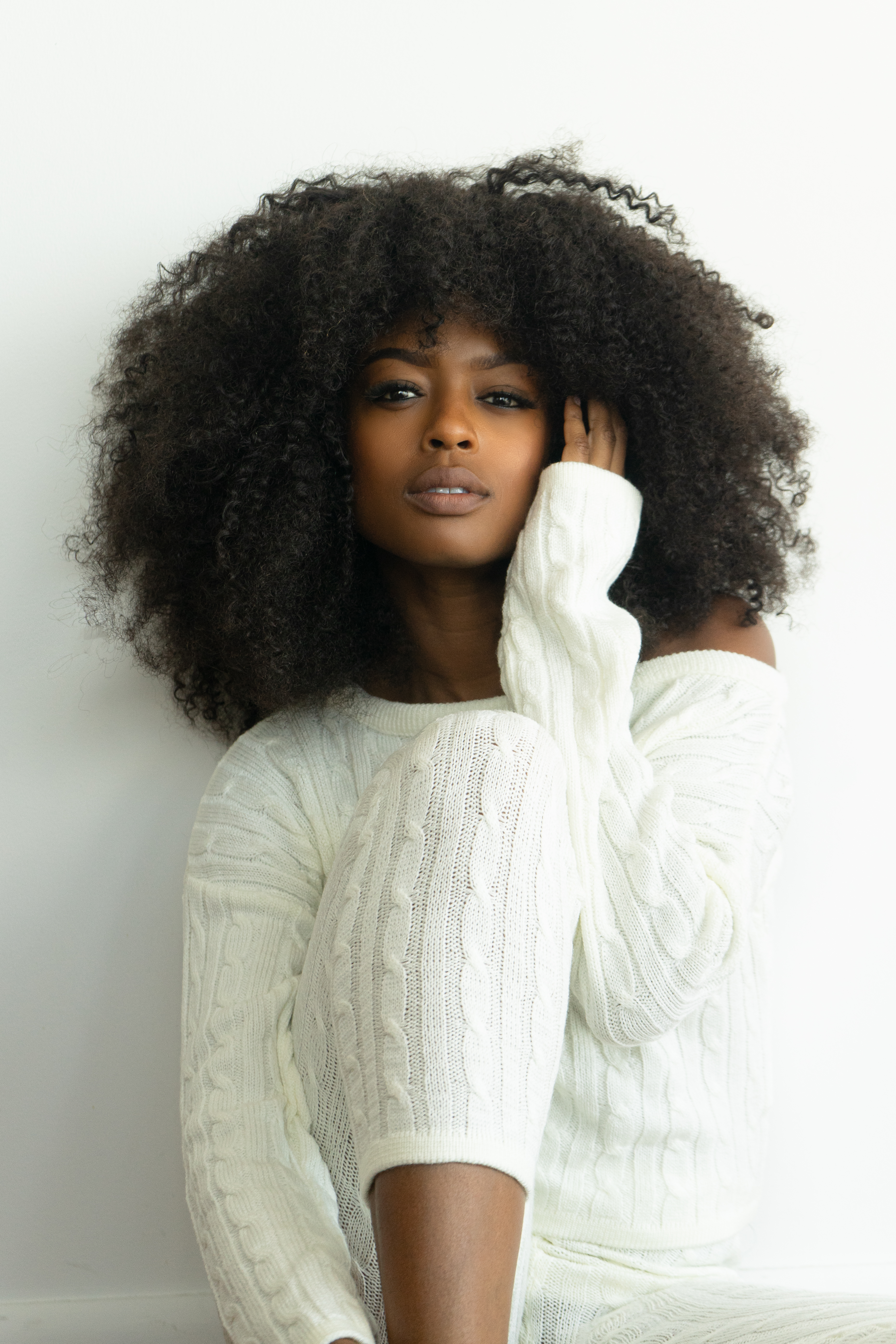
Javicia Leslie

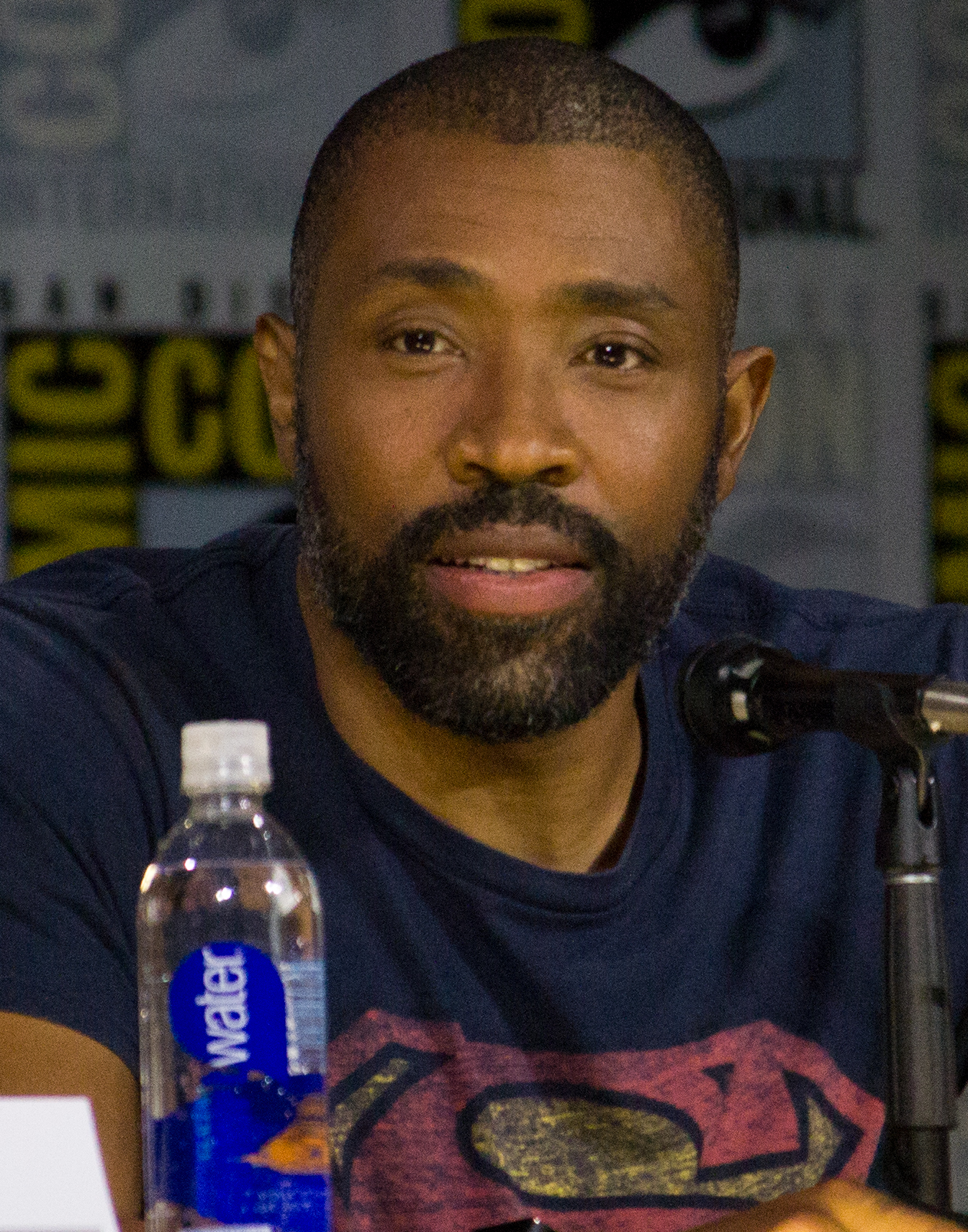
Cress Williams

Amell, Gustin, Echikunwoke, Benoist, Darvill headline Arrow, The Flash, Vixen, Supergirl, and the first season of Legends of Tomorrow, respectively. Lotz headlines seasons 2–7 of Legends of Tomorrow, Tovey headlines Freedom Fighters: The Ray, Rose headlines season 1 of Batwoman, Leslie headlines season 2–3 of Batwoman, and Williams headlines Black Lightning.

The Arrowverse is a media franchise and shared fictional universe that is the setting of superhero television series airing on The CW, produced by DC Entertainment and based on characters that appear in DC Comics publications. The shared universe includes seven live-action television series, Arrow, Batwoman, Black Lightning, The Flash, DC's Legends of Tomorrow, Supergirl, and two animated web series, Vixen, and Freedom Fighters: The Ray.

Each series has its own lead actors: Stephen Amell stars as Oliver Queen / Green Arrow on Arrow; Grant Gustin stars as Barry Allen / Flash on The Flash; Megalyn Echikunwoke stars as Mari McCabe / Vixen in Vixen; Melissa Benoist stars as Kara Danvers / Supergirl on Supergirl; Legends of Tomorrow features an ensemble cast including original headliner Arthur Darvill as Rip Hunter, subsequent headliner Caity Lotz as Sara Lance / White Canary, alongside Victor Garber as Martin Stein / Firestorm, Brandon Routh as Ray Palmer / The Atom, Ciara Renée as Kendra Saunders / Hawkgirl, Franz Drameh as Jefferson Jackson / Firestorm, Dominic Purcell as Mick Rory / Heat Wave, Wentworth Miller as Leonard Snart / Captain Cold, Falk Hentschel as Carter Hall / Hawkman, Amy Pemberton as the voice of Gideon, Nick Zano as Nate Heywood / Steel, Maisie Richardson-Sellers as Amaya Jiwe / Vixen, Matt Letscher as Eobard Thawne / Reverse-Flash, and Tala Ashe as Zari Tomaz; Cress Williams stars as Jefferson Pierce / Black Lightning on Black Lightning; Russell Tovey stars as Ray Terrill / The Ray in Freedom Fighters: The Ray; Batwoman stars original headliner Ruby Rose as Kate Kane / Batwoman in season 1 and subsequent headliner Javicia Leslie as Ryan Wilder / Batwoman in season 2.

== List indicators ==
These tables include main cast members, as well as notable guest stars that appear across two (or more) different series.
A dark grey cell indicates the character was not in the season, or that the character's presence in the season has not yet been announced.
An ^{M} indicates the actor was part of the main cast for the season.
A ^{U} indicates the actor was in the season as an "Arrowverse regular".
A ^{V} indicates a voice-only role.
A number beside a character's name indicates the character is from that alternate world (i.e. a ^{2} indicates a character from Earth-2).
A letter in the Further series column indicates the character has gone on to appear in another series, and links to the appropriate section for more information (A links to Arrow, B links to Batwoman, F links to The Flash, V links to Vixen, S links to the Supergirl, L links to Legends of Tomorrow, and FF links to Freedom Fighters).

== Arrow ==
| Character | Season 1 (2012–13) | Season 2 (2013–14) | Season 3 (2014–15) | Season 4 (2015–16) | Season 5 (2016–17) | Season 6 (2017–18) | Season 7 (2018–19) | Season 8 (2019–20) | Further series |
Introduced in season 1
| John Diggle Spartan | David Ramsey^{M} | David Ramsey^{M} | David Ramsey^{M} | David Ramsey^{M} | David Ramsey^{M} | David Ramsey^{M} | David Ramsey^{M} | David Ramsey^{M} | F • L • S • B |
| Roy Harper Arsenal | Colton Haynes | Colton Haynes^{M} | Colton Haynes^{M} | Colton Haynes | | Colton Haynes | Colton Haynes^{M} | Colton Haynes | |
| Laurel Lance Black Canary | Katie Cassidy^{M} | Katie Cassidy^{M} | Katie Cassidy^{M} | Katie Cassidy^{M} | Katie Cassidy^{U} | Katie Cassidy | Katie Cassidy | Katie Cassidy | F • V • L |
| Quentin Lance | Paul Blackthorne^{M} | Paul Blackthorne^{M} | Paul Blackthorne^{M} | Paul Blackthorne^{M} | Paul Blackthorne^{M} | Paul Blackthorne^{M} | Paul Blackthorne | Paul Blackthorne | F • L |
| Sara Lance Canary / White Canary | Jacqueline MacInnes Wood | Caity Lotz | Caity Lotz | Caity Lotz | Caity Lotz | Caity Lotz | Caity Lotz | Caity Lotz | F • L • S • B |
| Malcolm Merlyn Dark Archer / Ra's al Ghul | John Barrowman | John Barrowman | John Barrowman^{M} | John Barrowman^{M} | John Barrowman^{U} | | John Barrowman | John Barrowman | F • L |
| Tommy Merlyn | Colin Donnell^{M} | Colin Donnell | Colin Donnell | | | Colin Donnell | Colin Donnell | Colin Donnell | |
| Lyla Michaels Harbinger | Audrey Marie Anderson | Audrey Marie Anderson | Audrey Marie Anderson | Audrey Marie Anderson | Audrey Marie Anderson | Audrey Marie Anderson | Audrey Marie Anderson | Audrey Marie Anderson | F • S • B • L |
| Moira Queen | Susanna Thompson^{M} | Susanna Thompson^{M} | Susanna Thompson^{V} | | Susanna Thompson | | | Susanna Thompson | |
| Oliver Queen Hood / Arrow / Green Arrow / Spectre | Stephen Amell^{M} | Stephen Amell^{M} | Stephen Amell^{M} | Stephen Amell^{M} | Stephen Amell^{M} | Stephen Amell^{M} | Stephen Amell^{M} | Stephen Amell^{M} | F • V • L • S • B |
| Thea Queen Speedy | Willa Holland^{M} | Willa Holland^{M} | Willa Holland^{M} | Willa Holland^{M} | Willa Holland^{M} | Willa Holland^{M} | Willa Holland | Willa Holland | F |
| Felicity Smoak Overwatch | Emily Bett Rickards | Emily Bett Rickards^{M} | Emily Bett Rickards^{M} | Emily Bett Rickards^{M} | Emily Bett Rickards^{M} | Emily Bett Rickards^{M} | Emily Bett Rickards^{M} | Emily Bett Rickards | F • V • L • S |
| Slade Wilson Deathstroke | Manu Bennett | Manu Bennett^{M} | Manu Bennett | | Manu Bennett | Manu Bennett | | Manu Bennett | |
Introduced in season 2
| Barry Allen Flash | | Grant Gustin | Grant Gustin | Grant Gustin | Grant Gustin | Grant Gustin | Grant Gustin | Grant Gustin | F • V • S • L • B |
| Samantha Clayton | | Anna Hopkins | | Anna Hopkins | Anna Hopkins | Anna Hopkins | | | F |
| Nyssa al Ghul | | Katrina Law | Katrina Law | Katrina Law | Katrina Law | Katrina Law | Katrina Law | Katrina Law | L |
| Linda Park | | Olivia Cheng | | | | | | | F |
| Cisco Ramon Vibe | | Carlos Valdes | Carlos Valdes | Carlos Valdes | Carlos Valdes | Carlos Valdes | Carlos Valdes | | F • V • S • L • FF |
| Caitlin Snow Killer Frost | | Danielle Panabaker | Danielle Panabaker | Danielle Panabaker | | Danielle Panabaker | Danielle Panabaker | | F • L • S • FF |
| William Tockman Clock King | | Robert Knepper | | | | | | | F |
Introduced in season 3
| Ra's al Ghul | | | Matt Nable | | | | | | L |
| Ray Palmer Atom | | | Brandon Routh | Brandon Routh | Brandon Routh | | | Brandon Routh | F • V • L • S • B |
| Jake Simmons Deathbolt | | | Doug Jones | | | | | | F |
Introduced in season 4
| Aldus Boardman | | | | Peter Francis James | | | | | L |
| Damien Darhk | | | | Neal McDonough | Neal McDonough | | | | F • L |
| Eleanor "Nora" Darhk | | | | Tuesday Hofmann | | | | | F • L |
| Curtis Holt Mister Terrific | | | | Echo Kellum | Echo Kellum^{M} | Echo Kellum^{M} | Echo Kellum^{M} | Echo Kellum | L • FF |
Introduced in season 5
| Adrian Chase Prometheus | | | | | Josh Segarra^{M} | Josh Segarra | | Josh Segarra | |
| Dinah Drake Black Canary | | | | | Juliana Harkavy | Juliana Harkavy^{M} | Juliana Harkavy^{M} | Juliana Harkavy^{M} | F • L |
| Rene Ramirez Wild Dog | | | | | Rick Gonzalez | Rick Gonzalez^{M} | Rick Gonzalez^{M} | Rick Gonzalez^{M} | L |
Introduced in season 6
| Ricardio Diaz Dragon | | | | | | Kirk Acevedo | Kirk Acevedo^{M} | | |
Introduced in season 7
| Connor Hawke | | | | | | | Joseph David-Jones | Joseph David-Jones^{M} | |
| Roger Hayden Psycho-Pirate | | | | | | | Bob Frazer | | S |
| Mar Novu The Monitor | | | | | | | LaMonica Garrett | LaMonica Garrett^{M} | F • L • S • B |
| Emiko Queen Green Arrow | | | | | | | Sea Shimooka^{M} | Sea Shimooka | |
| Mia Smoak Blackstar / Green Arrow | | | | | | | Katherine McNamara | Katherine McNamara^{M} | S • B • F |
Introduced in other series
| Jim Corrigan | | | | | | | | Stephen Lobo | |
| Ryan Choi | | | | | | | | Osric Chau | |
| William Clayton | | | | Jack Moore | Jack Moore | Jack Moore | Jack Moore (child); Ben Lewis (adult) | Jack Moore (child); Ben Lewis (adult)^{M} | |
| Alex Danvers | | | | | | | Chyler Leigh | | |
| Kara Danvers Supergirl | | | | | Melissa Benoist | Melissa Benoist | Melissa Benoist | Melissa Benoist | |
| John Deegan | | | | | | | Jeremy Davies | | |
| John Diggle, Jr. | | | | | Keon Boateng | Keon Boateng | Marcello Guede | Charlie Barnett | |
| Talia al Ghul | | | | | Lexa Doig | | | Lexa Doig | |
| Gideon | | | | | Amy Pemberton | | | | |
| Carter Hall Hawkman | | | | Falk Hentschel | | | | | |
| Nate Heywood Steel | | | | | Nick Zano | | | | |
| J'onn J'onzz Martian Manhunter | | | | | | | | David Harewood | |
| Kate Kane Batwoman | | | | | | | Ruby Rose | Ruby Rose | |
| Clark Kent Superman | | | | | | | Tyler Hoechlin | Tyler Hoechlin | |
| Lois Lane | | | | | | | | Elizabeth Tulloch | |
| Brie Larvan Bug-Eyed Bandit | | | | Emily Kinney | | | | | |
| Laurel Lance Black Siren^{2} | | | | | Katie Cassidy^{U} | Katie Cassidy^{M} | Katie Cassidy^{M} | Katie Cassidy^{M} | |
| Lex Luthor | | | | | | | | Jon Cryer | |
| Mari Jiwe McCabe Vixen | | | | Megalyn Echikunwoke | | | | | |
| Mobius Anti-Monitor | | | | | | | | LaMonica Garrett^{M} | |
| Kendra Saunders Hawkgirl | | | | Ciara Renée | | | | | |
| Vandal Savage | | | | Casper Crump | | | | | |
| David Singh | | | | | Patrick Sabongui | Patrick Sabongui | Patrick Sabongui | | |
| Eobard Thawne Reverse Flash | | | | | | Tom Cavanagh | Tom Cavanagh | | |
| Harrison "Harry" Wells^{2} | | | | | | Tom Cavanagh | | | |
| Iris West | | | | | | Candice Patton | | | |
Introduced outside the Arrowverse
| Barry Allen Flash^{90} | | | | | | | John Wesley Shipp | | |
| Barry Allen Flash^{DCEU} | | | | | | | | Ezra Miller | |
| John Constantine | | | | Matt Ryan | | | | | |

== The Flash ==
| Character | Season 1 (2014–15) | Season 2 (2015–16) | Season 3 (2016–17) | Season 4 (2017–18) | Season 5 (2018–19) | Season 6 (2019–20) | Season 7 (2021) | Season 8 (2021–22) | Season 9 (2023) | Further series |
Introduced in season 1
| Grodd | David Sobolov^{V} | David Sobolov^{V} | David Sobolov^{V} | | David Sobolov^{V} | David Sobolov^{V} | | | David Sobolov^{V} | L |
| Cecile Horton Virtue | Danielle Nicolet | | Danielle Nicolet | Danielle Nicolet | Danielle Nicolet^{M} | Danielle Nicolet^{M} | Danielle Nicolet^{M} | Danielle Nicolet^{M} | Danielle Nicolet^{M} | S |
| Brie Larvan Bug-Eyed Bandit | Emily Kinney | | | | Emily Kinney | | | | | A |
| Mick Rory Heat Wave | Dominic Purcell | Dominic Purcell | Dominic Purcell | | | | | | | L • A • S • B |
| Kendra Saunders Hawkgirl | Ciara Renée | Ciara Renée | | | | | | | | A • L |
| Leonard Snart Captain Cold | Wentworth Miller | Wentworth Miller | Wentworth Miller^{U} | Wentworth Miller | | | | | | L |
| David Singh | Patrick Sabongui | Patrick Sabongui | Patrick Sabongui | Patrick Sabongui | Patrick Sabongui | Patrick Sabongui | Patrick Sabongui | Patrick Sabongui | Patrick Sabongui | A • S |
| Clarissa Stein | Isabella Hofmann | Isabella Hofmann | | | | | | | | L • S |
| Martin Stein Firestorm | Victor Garber | Victor Garber | Victor Garber | Victor Garber | | | | | Victor Garber^{V} | V • L • S |
| Eddie Thawne Cobalt Blue | Rick Cosnett^{M} | Rick Cosnett | Rick Cosnett | | | | | Rick Cosnett | Rick Cosnett | |
| Eobard Thawne Reverse-Flash (Note: Eobard Thawne is portrayed by recurring guest star Matt Letscher, but he was introduced in the first season of The Flash while having assumed the identity and appearance of Harrison Wells, during which time he was portrayed by main cast member Tom Cavanaugh.) | Tom Cavanagh^{M} Matt Letscher | Tom Cavanagh; Matt Letscher | Matt Letscher | Tom Cavanagh | Tom Cavanagh | Tom Cavanagh | Tom Cavanagh | Tom Cavanagh; Matt Letscher | Tom Cavanagh; Matt Letscher | L • A • S |
| Harrison Wells | Tom Cavanagh | | | | | | Tom Cavanagh^{M} | | Tom Cavanagh | |
| Iris West | Candice Patton^{M} | Candice Patton^{M} | Candice Patton^{M} | Candice Patton^{M} | Candice Patton^{M} | Candice Patton^{M} | Candice Patton^{M} | Candice Patton^{M} | Candice Patton^{M} | L • A • S • B |
| Joe West | Jesse L. Martin^{M} | Jesse L. Martin^{M} | Jesse L. Martin^{M} | Jesse L. Martin^{M} | Jesse L. Martin^{M} | Jesse L. Martin^{M} | Jesse L. Martin^{M} | Jesse L. Martin^{M} | Jesse L. Martin | S |
Introduced in season 2
| William Clayton | | Jack Moore | | | | | | | | A |
| Jay Garrick Flash^{3} | | John Wesley Shipp | John Wesley Shipp | John Wesley Shipp | | John Wesley Shipp | John Wesley Shipp | John Wesley Shipp | John Wesley Shipp | |
| Carter Hall Hawkman | | Falk Hentschel | | | | | | | | A • L |
| Jefferson "Jax" Jackson Firestorm | | Franz Drameh | Franz Drameh | Franz Drameh | | | | | | V • L • S • A |
| Shay Lamden King Shark | | David Hayter | David Hayter | David Hayter | | | | | | S |
| Laurel Lance Black Siren^{2} | | Katie Cassidy | | | | | | | | A |
| Vandal Savage | | Casper Crump | | | | | | | | A • L |
| Lewis Snart | | Michael Ironside | | | | | | | | L |
| Harrison "Harry" Wells^{2} | | Tom Cavanagh^{M} | Tom Cavanagh^{M} | Tom Cavanagh^{M} | Tom Cavanagh | Tom Cavanagh | Tom Cavanagh | | | S • A • L |
| Jesse Wells Jesse Quick | | Violett Beane | Violett Beane | Violett Beane | | | | | | L |
| Wally West Kid Flash | | Keiynan Lonsdale^{M} | Keiynan Lonsdale^{M} | Keiynan Lonsdale^{M} | Keiynan Lonsdale | Keiynan Lonsdale | | | Keiynan Lonsdale | S • L |
| Hunter Zolomon Zoom / Black Flash | | Teddy Sears | Unnamed stand-in | | Teddy Sears | | | | Teddy Sears | L |
Introduced in season 3
| Smith "Glasses" | | | Donnelly Rhodes | | | | | | | L |
| Harrison "H.R." Wells^{19} | | | Tom Cavanagh^{M} | | | | Tom Cavanagh | | | |
| Julian Albert Alchemy | | | Tom Felton | | | | | | | |
Introduced in season 4
| Clifford DeVoe Thinker | | | | Neil Sandilands^{M} | | | | | | |
| Ralph Dibny Elongated Man | | | | Hartley Sawyer | Hartley Sawyer^{M} | Hartley Sawyer^{M} | Unnamed stand-in | | | |
| Ray Terrill The Ray | | | | Russell Tovey | | | | | | L • FF • S |
| Leonard "Leo" Snart^{X} | | | | Wentworth Miller | | | | | | L |
| Harrison Wolfgang "Herr" Wells^{12} | | | | Tom Cavanagh | Tom Cavanagh | | | | | |
Introduced in season 5
| Orlin Dwyer Cicada | | | | | Chris Klein^{M} | | | | | |
| Joss Jackam Weather Witch | | | | | Reina Hardesty | | | | | L |
| Kate Kane Batwoman | | | | | Ruby Rose | Ruby Rose | | | | A • B • S • L |
| Lois Lane | | | | | Elizabeth Tulloch | Elizabeth Tulloch | | | | S • B • A • L |
| Harrison "Sherloque" Wells^{221} | | | | | Tom Cavanagh^{M} | Tom Cavanagh | Tom Cavanagh | | | |
Introduced in season 6
| Allegra Garcia | | | | | | Kayla Compton | Kayla Compton^{M} | Kayla Compton^{M} | Kayla Compton^{M} | |
| Ryan Choi | | | | | | Osric Chau | | Osric Chau | | A • L |
| Jim Corrigan | | | | | | Stephen Lobo | | | | A |
| Eva McCulloch Mirror Mistress | | | | | | Efrat Dor^{M} | Efrat Dor^{M} | | | |
| Chester P. Runk | | | | | | Brandon McKnight | Brandon McKnight ^{M} | Brandon McKnight ^{M} | Brandon McKnight ^{M} | |
| Joan Williams^{3} | | | | | | Michelle Harrison | Michelle Harrison | Michelle Harrison | Michelle Harrison | |
| Harrison "Nash" Wells Pariah | | | | | | Tom Cavanagh^{M} | Tom Cavanagh^{M} | | | S • B • A • L |
Introduced in season 7
| Mark Blaine Chillblaine | | | | | | | Jon Cor | Jon Cor | Jon Cor^{M} | |
Introduced in other series
| Barry Allen Flash | Grant Gustin^{M} Logan Williams | Grant Gustin^{M} Logan Williams | Grant Gustin^{M} | Grant Gustin^{M} | Grant Gustin^{M} | Grant Gustin^{M} | Grant Gustin^{M} | Grant Gustin^{M} | Grant Gustin^{M} | |
| Samantha Clayton | Anna Hopkins | Anna Hopkins | | | | | | | | |
| Alex Danvers | | | | Chyler Leigh | | | | Chyler Leigh | | |
| Kara Danvers Supergirl | | | Melissa Benoist | Melissa Benoist | Melissa Benoist | Melissa Benoist | | | | |
| Damien Darhk | | Neal McDonough | | | | | | Neal McDonough | | |
| Eleanor "Nora" Darhk | | | | | | | | Courtney Ford | | |
| John Diggle Spartan | David Ramsey | David Ramsey | David Ramsey | David Ramsey | David Ramsey | David Ramsey | David Ramsey | David Ramsey | David Ramsey | |
| J'onn J'onzz Martian Manhunter | | | David Harewood | | | David Harewood | | | | |
| Clark Kent Superman | | | | | Tyler Hoechlin | Tyler Hoechlin | | | | |
| Laurel Lance Black Canary | Katie Cassidy | | | | | | | | | |
| Quentin Lance | Paul Blackthorne | | | | | | | | | |
| Sara Lance Canary / White Canary | | | Caity Lotz | Caity Lotz | | Caity Lotz | | | | |
| Lex Luthor | | | | | | Jon Cryer | | | | |
| Music Meister | | | Darren Criss | | | | | | | |
| Malcolm Merlyn Dark Archer / Ra's al Ghul | | John Barrowman | John Barrowman^{U} | | | | | | | |
| Lyla Michaels Harbinger | | Audrey Marie Anderson | Audrey Marie Anderson | | | Audrey Marie Anderson | | | | |
| Mobius Anti-Monitor | | | | | | LaMonica Garrett^{M} | | | | |
| Mon-El | | | Chris Wood | | | | | | | |
| Mar Novu The Monitor | | | | | LaMonica Garrett | LaMonica Garrett^{M} | | | | |
| Ray Palmer Atom | Brandon Routh | | Brandon Routh | | | Brandon Routh | | Brandon Routh | | |
| Linda Park | Malese Jow | Malese Jow | | | | | | | | |
| Jefferson Pierce Black Lightning | | | | | | Cress Williams | | Cress Williams | | |
| Oliver Queen Arrow / Green Arrow / Spectre | Stephen Amell | Stephen Amell | Stephen Amell | Stephen Amell | Stephen Amell | Stephen Amell | | | Stephen Amell | |
| Thea Queen Speedy | | Willa Holland | Willa Holland | | | | | | | |
| Cisco Ramon Vibe | Carlos Valdes^{M} | Carlos Valdes^{M} | Carlos Valdes^{M} | Carlos Valdes^{M} | Carlos Valdes^{M} | Carlos Valdes^{M} | Carlos Valdes^{M} | | | |
| Winslow "Winn" Schott, Jr. | | | Jeremy Jordan | | | | | | | |
| Jake Simmons Deathbolt | Doug Jones | | | | | | | | | |
| Felicity Smoak Overwatch | Emily Bett Rickards | Emily Bett Rickards | Emily Bett Rickards | Emily Bett Rickards | | | | | | |
| Mia Smoak Green Arrow | | | | | | Katherine McNamara | | Katherine McNamara | | |
| Caitlin Snow Killer Frost | Danielle Panabaker^{M} | Danielle Panabaker^{M} | Danielle Panabaker^{M} | Danielle Panabaker^{M} | Danielle Panabaker^{M} | Danielle Panabaker^{M} | Danielle Panabaker^{M} | Danielle Panabaker^{M} | Danielle Panabaker^{M} | |
| Lily Stein | | | Christina Brucato | | | | | | | |
| Eve Teschmacher | | | Andrea Brooks | | | | | | | |
| William Tockman Clock King | Robert Knepper | | | | | | | | | |
| Nora West-Allen XS | | | | Jessica Parker Kennedy | Jessica Parker Kennedy^{M} | | Jessica Parker Kennedy | Jessica Parker Kennedy | Jessica Parker Kennedy | |
| Ryan Wilder Batwoman | | | | | | | | Javicia Leslie | Javicia Leslie | |
Introduced outside the Arrowverse
| Barry Allen Flash^{90} | | | | | John Wesley Shipp | John Wesley Shipp | | | | |
| John Constantine | | | | | | Matt Ryan | | | | |
| Clark Kent Superman^{96} | | | | | | Brandon Routh | | | | |
| Helena Kyle Huntress^{203} | | | | | | Ashley Scott | | | | |
| Barbara Gordon Oracle^{203} | | | | | | Dina Meyer^{V} | | | | |

== Vixen ==
| Character | Season 1 (2015) | Season 2 (2016) | Further series |
Introduced in season 1
| Mari Jiwe McCabe Vixen | Megalyn Echikunwoke^{M} ^{V} | Megalyn Echikunwoke^{M} ^{V} | A • FF |
| Kuasa | Anika Noni Rose^{V} | Anika Noni Rose^{V} | L |
Introduced in other series
| Barry Allen Flash | Grant Gustin^{V} | Grant Gustin^{V} | |
| Jefferson "Jax" Jackson Firestorm | | Franz Drameh^{V} | |
| Laurel Lance Black Canary | | Katie Cassidy^{U} ^{V} | |
| Ray Palmer Atom | | Brandon Routh^{V} | |
| Oliver Queen Arrow / Green Arrow | Stephen Amell^{V} | Stephen Amell^{V} | |
| Cisco Ramon Vibe | Carlos Valdes^{V} | Carlos Valdes^{V} | |
| Felicity Smoak Overwatch | Emily Bett Rickards^{V} | Emily Bett Rickards^{V} | |
| Martin Stein Firestorm | | Victor Garber^{V} | |

== Supergirl ==
| Character | Season 1 (2015–16) | Season 2 (2016–17) | Season 3 (2017–18) | Season 4 (2018–19) | Season 5 (2019–20) | Season 6 (2021) | Further series |
Introduced in season 1
| Alex Danvers | Chyler Leigh^{M} Jordana Taylor | Chyler Leigh^{M} Jordana Taylor | Chyler Leigh^{M} Olivia Nikkanen | Chyler Leigh^{M} Olivia Nikkanen | Chyler Leigh^{M} Olivia Nikkanen | Chyler Leigh^{M} Olivia Nikkanen | A • F • L |
| Kara Danvers Supergirl | Melissa Benoist^{M} Malina Weissman | Melissa Benoist^{M} Malina Weissman | Melissa Benoist^{M} Izabela Vidovic | Melissa Benoist^{M} Izabela Vidovic | Melissa Benoist^{M} | Melissa Benoist^{M} Izabela Vidovic | A • F • L • B |
| Cat Grant | Calista Flockhart^{M} | Calista Flockhart | Calista Flockhart | | | Calista Flockhart; Eliza Helm | |
| J'onn J'onzz Martian Manhunter | David Harewood^{M} | David Harewood^{M} | David Harewood^{M} | David Harewood^{M} | David Harewood^{M} | David Harewood^{M} | F • A • L |
| Clark Kent Superman | Kevin Caliber (uncredited) | Tyler Hoechlin | | Tyler Hoechlin | Tyler Hoechlin | | A • F • L • B |
| James Olsen Guardian | Mehcad Brooks^{M} | Mehcad Brooks^{M} | Mehcad Brooks^{M} | Mehcad Brooks^{M} | Mehcad Brooks^{M} | Mehcad Brooks | |
| Winslow "Winn" Schott, Jr. | Jeremy Jordan^{M} | Jeremy Jordan^{M} | Jeremy Jordan^{M} | | Jeremy Jordan | Jeremy Jordan | F |
Introduced in season 2
| Lena Luthor | | Katie McGrath | Katie McGrath^{M} | Katie McGrath^{M} | Katie McGrath^{M} | Katie McGrath^{M} | |
| Music Meister | | Darren Criss | | | | | F |
| Mon-El | | Chris Wood^{M} | Chris Wood^{M} | | Chris Wood | Chris Wood | F |
| Maggie Sawyer | | Floriana Lima^{M} | Floriana Lima | | | | |
| Eve Teschmacher | | Andrea Brooks | Andrea Brooks | Andrea Brooks | Andrea Brooks^{M} | Andrea Brooks | F |
Introduced in season 3
| Samantha Arias Reign | | | Odette Annable^{M} | | Odette Annable | | |
| Querl Dox Brainiac 5 | | | Jesse Rath | Jesse Rath^{M} | Jesse Rath^{M} | Jesse Rath^{M} | |
| Kara Overgirl^{X} | | | Melissa Benoist | | | Unnamed stand-in | A • F • L • FF |
| Oliver Dark Arrow^{X} | | | Stephen Amell | | | | A • F • L |
| Nora West-Allen XS | | | Jessica Parker Kennedy | | | | F |
Introduced in season 4
| Lauren Haley | | | | April Parker Jones^{M} | | | |
| Ben Lockwood Agent Liberty | | | | Sam Witwer^{M} | Sam Witwer | | |
| Lex Luthor | | | | Jon Cryer | Jon Cryer | Jon Cryer | A • B • F • L |
| Nia Nal Dreamer | | | | Nicole Maines^{M} | Nicole Maines^{M} | Nicole Maines^{M} | L • F |
| Kelly Olsen | | | | Azie Tesfai | Azie Tesfai^{M} | Azie Tesfai^{M} | |
Introduced in season 5
| Andrea Rojas Acrata | | | | | Julie Gonzalo^{M} | Julie Gonzalo^{M} | |
| William Dey | | | | | Staz Nair^{M} | Staz Nair^{M} | |
| Jonathan Kent | | | | | Benjamin Hogewoning; Elias Hogewoning | | B |
Introduced in season 6
| Nyxly | | | | | | Peta Sergeant^{M} | |
Introduced in other series
| Barry Allen Flash | Grant Gustin | Grant Gustin | Grant Gustin | Grant Gustin | Grant Gustin | | |
| John Diggle Spartan | | | | | | David Ramsey | |
| Gary Green | | | | Adam Tsekhman | | | |
| Roger Hayden Psycho-Pirate | | | | Bob Frazer | | | |
| Cecile Horton | | | Danielle Nicolet | | | | |
| Jefferson "Jax" Jackson Firestorm | | | Franz Drameh | | | | |
| Kate Kane Batwoman | | | | Ruby Rose | Ruby Rose | | |
| Sara Lance White Canary | | | Caity Lotz | | Caity Lotz | | |
| Lois Lane | | | | Elizabeth Tulloch | Elizabeth Tulloch | | |
| Lyla Michaels Harbinger | | | | | Audrey Marie Anderson | | |
| Mar Novu The Monitor | | | | LaMonica Garrett | LaMonica Garrett^{M} | | |
| Oliver Queen Green Arrow | | | Stephen Amell | Stephen Amell | Stephen Amell | | |
| Oliver Queen Green Arrow^{16} | | | | | Stephen Amell | | |
| Ray Palmer The Atom | | | | | Brandon Routh | | |
| Cisco Ramon Vibe | | Carlos Valdes | Carlos Valdes | Carlos Valdes | | | |
| Mick Rory Heat Wave | | | Dominic Purcell | | | | |
| David Singh | | | Patrick Sabongui | | | | |
| Felicity Smoak Overwatch | | | Emily Bett Rickards | | | | |
| Mia Smoak Green Arrow | | | | | Katherine McNamara | | |
| Caitlin Snow Killer Frost | | | Danielle Panabaker | Danielle Panabaker | | | |
| Clarissa Stein | | | Isabella Hofmann | | | | |
| Lily Stein | | | Christina Brucato | | | | |
| Martin Stein Firestorm | | | Victor Garber | | | | |
| Harrison "Harry" Wells^{2} | | | Tom Cavanagh | | | | |
| Eobard Thawne Reverse Flash | | | Tom Cavanagh | | | | |
| "Nash" Wells Pariah | | | | | Tom Cavanagh | | |
| Iris West | | | Candice Patton | | | | |
| Joe West | | | Jesse L. Martin | | | | |
| Wally West Kid Flash | | | Keiynan Lonsdale | | | | |
Introduced outside the Arrowverse
| Barry Allen Flash^{90} | | | | John Wesley Ship | | | |
| Dick Grayson^{66} | | | | | Burt Ward | | |

== Legends of Tomorrow ==
| Character | Season 1 (2016) | Season 2 (2016–17) | Season 3 (2017–18) | Season 4 (2018–19) | Season 5 (2020) | Season 6 (2021) | Season 7 (2021–22) | Further series |
Introduced in season 1
| John Diggle, Jr. Connor Hawke / Green Arrow^{16} | Joseph David-Jones | | | | Marcello Guede | | | A |
| Jonah Hex | Johnathon Schaech | Johnathon Schaech | Johnathon Schaech | | | | | B |
| Talia al Ghul | Milli Wilkinson | | | | | | | A |
| Gideon | Amy Pemberton^{M} ^{V} (Note: Pemberton also physically appeared as the character in the second season episode, "Land of the Lost".) | Amy Pemberton^{M} ^{V} | Amy Pemberton^{M} ^{V} | Amy Pemberton^{M} ^{V} | Amy Pemberton^{M} ^{V} | Amy Pemberton^{M} ^{V} | Amy Pemberton^{M} ^{V} | A |
| Rip Hunter | Arthur Darvill^{M} | Arthur Darvill^{M} | Arthur Darvill | | | | Arthur Darvill | |
| Oliver Queen Green Arrow^{16} | Stephen Amell | | | | | | | S |
Introduced in season 2
| Nate Heywood Steel | | Nick Zano^{M} | Nick Zano^{M} | Nick Zano^{M} | Nick Zano^{M} | Nick Zano^{M} | Nick Zano^{M} | A |
| Amaya Jiwe Vixen | | Maisie Richardson-Sellers^{M} | Maisie Richardson-Sellers^{M} | | | | | |
| Lily Stein | | Christina Brucato | Christina Brucato | | | | | F • S |
Introduced in season 3
| Gary Green | | | Adam Tsekhman | Adam Tsekhman | Adam Tsekhman | Adam Tsekhman ^{M} | Adam Tsekhman ^{M} | S |
| Ava Sharpe | | | Jes Macallan | Jes Macallan ^{M} | Jes Macallan ^{M} | Jes Macallan ^{M} | Jes Macallan ^{M} | |
| Zari Tomaz | | | Tala Ashe^{M} | Tala Ashe^{M} | Tala Ashe^{M} | Tala Ashe^{M} | Tala Ashe^{M} | |
Introduced in season 4
| Astra Logue | | | | Olivia Swann | Olivia Swann ^{M} | Olivia Swann ^{M} | Olivia Swann ^{M} | |
| Charlie | | | | Maisie Richardson-Sellers ^{M} | Maisie Richardson-Sellers ^{M} | | | |
| Behrad Tarazi | | | | Shayan Sobhian | Shayan Sobhian | Shayan Sobhian ^{M} | Shayan Sobhian ^{M} | |
| Mona Wu | | | | Ramona Young ^{M} | Ramona Young | | | |
Introduced in season 6
| Esperanza "Spooner" Cruz | | | | | | Lisseth Chavez ^{M} | Lisseth Chavez ^{M} | |
Introduced in season 7
| Gwyn Davies | | | | | | | Matt Ryan ^{M} | |
Introduced in other series
| Barry Allen Flash | | Grant Gustin | Grant Gustin | | Grant Gustin | | | |
| Aldus Boardman | Peter Francis James | | | | | | | |
| Ryan Choi | | | | | Osric Chau | | | |
| Alex Danvers | | | Chyler Leigh | | Chyler Leigh | | | |
| Kara Danvers Supergirl | | Melissa Benoist | Melissa Benoist | | Melissa Benoist | | | |
| Damien Darhk | Neal McDonough | Neal McDonough | Neal McDonough | | Neal McDonough | | | |
| Eleanor "Nora" Darhk | | | Courtney Ford; Madeleine Arthur | Courtney Ford ^{M} | Courtney Ford ^{M} | | Courtney Ford | |
| John Diggle Spartan | | David Ramsey | David Ramsey | | David Ramsey | | | |
| Dinah Drake Black Canary | | | | | Juliana Harkavy | | | |
| Ra's al Ghul | Matt Nable | | | | | | | |
| Nyssa al Ghul | Katrina Law | | | | | | | |
| Smith "Glasses" | | Donnelly Rhodes; Jacob Richter | Jacob Richter | | | | | |
| Grodd | | | David Sobolov^{V} | | | | | |
| Carter Hall Hawkman | Falk Hentschel^{M} | | | | | | Falk Hentschel | |
| Curtis Holt Mister Terrific | | | Echo Kellum | | | | | |
| Joss Jackam Weather Witch | | | | | Reina Hardesty | | | |
| Jefferson "Jax" Jackson Firestorm | Franz Drameh^{M} | Franz Drameh^{M} | Franz Drameh^{M} | | | | Franz Drameh | |
| J'onn J'onzz Martian Manhunter | | | | | David Harewood | | | |
| Kate Kane Batwoman | | | | | Ruby Rose | | | |
| Clark Kent Superman | | | | | Tyler Hoechlin | | | |
| Kuasa | | | Tracy Ifeachor | | | | | |
| Laurel Lance Black Canary | Katie Cassidy | Katie Cassidy^{U} | | | | | | |
| Quentin Lance | Paul Blackthorne | | | | | | | |
| Sara Lance Canary / White Canary | Caity Lotz^{M} | Caity Lotz^{M} | Caity Lotz^{M} | Caity Lotz^{M} | Caity Lotz^{M} | Caity Lotz^{M} | Caity Lotz^{M} | |
| Lois Lane | | | | | Elizabeth Tulloch | | | |
| Lex Luthor | | | | | Jon Cryer | | | |
| Malcolm Merlyn Dark Archer / Ra's al Ghul | | John Barrowman^{U} | | | | | | |
| Lyla Michaels Harbinger | | | | | Audrey Marie Anderson | | | |
| Mobius Anti-Monitor | | | | | LaMonica Garrett | | | |
| Nia Nal Dreamer | | | | | Nicole Maines | | | |
| Mar Novu The Monitor | | | | LaMonica Garrett | | | | |
| Ray Palmer Atom | Brandon Routh^{M} | Brandon Routh^{M} | Brandon Routh^{M} Jack Fisher | Brandon Routh^{M} | Brandon Routh^{M} | | Brandon Routh | |
| Jefferson Pierce Black Lightning | | | | | Cress Williams | | | |
| Oliver Queen Green Arrow | Stephen Amell | Stephen Amell | Stephen Amell | | Stephen Amell^{V} | | | |
| Rene Ramirez Wild Dog | | | | | Rick Gonzalez | | | |
| Cisco Ramon Vibe | Carlos Valdes | Carlos Valdes | Carlos Valdes | | | | | |
| Mick Rory Heat Wave | Dominic Purcell^{M} Mitchell Kummen | Dominic Purcell^{M} | Dominic Purcell^{M} | Dominic Purcell^{M} | Dominic Purcell^{M} | Dominic Purcell^{M} | | |
| Kendra Saunders Hawkgirl | Ciara Renée^{M} | | | | | | | |
| Vandal Savage | Casper Crump | | | | | | | |
| Felicity Smoak Overwatch | Emily Bett Rickards | Emily Bett Rickards | Emily Bett Rickards | | | | | |
| Leonard Snart Captain Cold | Wentworth Miller^{M} | Wentworth Miller^{U} | | | | | Wentworth Miller | |
| Leonard "Leo" Snart^{X} | | | Wentworth Miller | | | | | |
| Lewis Snart | Jason Beaudoin | | | | | | | |
| Caitlin Snow Killer Frost | | Danielle Panabaker | Danielle Panabaker | | Danielle Panabaker | | | |
| Clarissa Stein | Isabella Hofmann; Chanelle Stevenson | Emily Tennant | Isabella Hofmann | | | | | |
| Martin Stein Firestorm | Victor Garber^{M} Graeme McComb | Victor Garber^{M} Graeme McComb | Victor Garber^{M} Graeme McComb | | | | Victor Garber | |
| Ray Terrill The Ray | | | Russell Tovey | | | | | |
| Eobard Thawne Reverse-Flash | | Matt Letscher^{M} | Tom Cavanagh | | | | Matt Letscher | |
| Harrison "Harry" Wells^{2} | | | Tom Cavanagh | | | | | |
| Harrison "Nash" Wells Pariah | | | | | Tom Cavanagh | | | |
| Iris West | | | Candice Patton | | | | | |
| Wally West Kid Flash | | | Keiynan Lonsdale^{M} | | | | | |
| Hunter Zolomon Black Flash | | Unnamed stand in | | | | | | |
Introduced outside the Arrowverse
| John Constantine | | | Matt Ryan | Matt Ryan ^{M} | Matt Ryan ^{M} | Matt Ryan ^{M} | | |
| Clark Kent Superman^{96} | | | | | Brandon Routh | | | |

== Freedom Fighters: The Ray ==
Freedom Fighters: The Ray cast and characters

Freedom Fighters: The Ray cast and characters
| Character | Season 1 (2017) | Season 2 (2018) | Further series |
Introduced in season 1
| Jenny Knight Phantom Lady^{X} | Dilshad Vadsaria^{M} ^{V} | Dilshad Vadsaria^{M} ^{V} | |
| John Trujillo Black Condor^{X} | Jason Mitchell^{M} ^{V} | Jason Mitchell^{M} ^{V} | |
Introduced in other series
| Kara Overgirl^{X} | Melissa Benoist^{V} | Melissa Benoist^{V} | |
| Curtis Holt Mister Terrific | | Echo Kellum^{V} | |
| Mari McCabe Vixen | | Megalyn Echikunwoke^{V} | |
| Cisco Ramon Vibe | Carlos Valdes^{V} | Carlos Valdes^{V} | |
| Caitlin Snow Killer Frost | Danielle Panabaker^{V} | | |
| Red Tornado^{X} | Iddo Goldberg^{V} | | |
| Ray Terrill The Ray | Russell Tovey^{M} ^{V} | Russell Tovey^{M} ^{V} | |

== Black Lightning ==
| Character | Season 1 (2018) | Season 2 (2018–19) | Season 3 (2019–20) | Season 4 (2021) | Further series |
Introduced in season 1
| Grace Choi Wylde | Chantal Thuy | Chantal Thuy; Joseph Steven Yang | Chantal Thuy; Joseph Steven Yang; Stella Smith | Chantal Thuy ^{M} | |
| Peter Gambi | James Remar ^{M} | James Remar ^{M} | James Remar ^{M} | James Remar ^{M} | |
| Inspector Henderson | Damon Gupton ^{M} | Damon Gupton ^{M} | Damon Gupton ^{M} | Damon Gupton ^{V} | |
| Khalil Payne Painkiller | Jordan Calloway | Jordan Calloway ^{M} | Jordan Calloway ^{M} | Jordan Calloway ^{M} | |
| Anissa Pierce Thunder / Blackbird | Nafessa Williams ^{M} | Nafessa Williams ^{M} | Nafessa Williams ^{M} | Nafessa Williams ^{M} | |
| Jefferson Pierce Black Lightning | Cress Williams ^{M} Kaden Washington Lewis | Cress Williams ^{M} | Cress Williams ^{M} | Cress Williams ^{M} Kaden Washington Lewis | F • L |
| Jennifer Pierce Lightning | China Anne McClain ^{M} Fallyn Brown | China Anne McClain ^{M} | China Anne McClain ^{M} | China Anne McClain ^{M} Laura Kariuk | |
| Lynn Stewart | Christine Adams ^{M} | Christine Adams ^{M} | Christine Adams ^{M} | Christine Adams ^{M} | |
| Tobias Whale | Marvin Jones III ^{M} | Marvin Jones III ^{M} | Marvin Jones III ^{M} | Marvin Jones III ^{M} | |

== Batwoman ==
Batwoman cast and characters

Batwoman cast and characters
| Character | Season 1 (2019–20) | Season 2 (2021) | Season 3 (2021–22) | Further series |
Introduced in season 1
| Luke Fox Batwing | Camrus Johnson ^{M} | Camrus Johnson ^{M} | Camrus Johnson ^{M} | |
| Catherine Hamilton-Kane | Elizabeth Anweis ^{M} | | | |
| Mary Hamilton | Nicole Kang ^{M} | Nicole Kang ^{M} | Nicole Kang ^{M} | |
| Beth Kane Alice | Rachel Skarsten ^{M} Ava Sleeth | Rachel Skarsten ^{M} Ava Sleeth | Rachel Skarsten ^{M} | |
| Jacob Kane | Dougray Scott ^{M} | Dougray Scott ^{M} | | |
| Sophie Moore | Meagan Tandy ^{M} | Meagan Tandy ^{M} | Meagan Tandy ^{M} | |
| Leonard^{74} | Wentworth Miller^{V} | | | F |
| Bruce Wayne Batman^{99} | Kevin Conroy | | | |
Introduced in season 2
| Ryan Wilder Batwoman | | Javicia Leslie ^{M} | Javicia Leslie ^{M} | F |
Introduced in season 3
| Jada Jett | | | Robin Givens | |
| Marquis Jet | | | Nick Creegan | |
| Renee Montoya | | | Victoria Cartagena | |
Introduced in other series
| Kara Danvers Supergirl | Melissa Benoist | | | |
| John Diggle Spartan | | David Ramsey | David Ramsey | |
| Jonah Hex | Johnathon Schaech | | | |
| Kate Kane Batwoman | Ruby Rose ^{M} Gracyn Shinyei | Wallis Day; Gracyn Shinyei | | |
| Clark Kent Superman | Tyler Hoechlin | | | |
| Sara Lance White Canary | Caity Lotz | | | |
| Jonathan Kent | Benjamin Hogewoning; Elias Hogewoning | | | |
| Lois Lane | Elizabeth Tulloch | | | |
| Lex Luthor | Jon Cryer | | | |
| Lyla Michaels Harbringer | Audrey Marie Anderson | | | |
| Mar Novu The Monitor | LaMonica Garrett | | | |
| Ray Palmer The Atom | Brandon Routh | | | |
| Oliver Queen Green Arrow | Stephen Amell | | | |
| Mick Rory Heat Wave | Dominic Purcell | | | |
| Mia Smoak Green Arrow | Katherine McNamara | | | |
| Iris West | Candice Patton | | | |
Introduced outside the Arrowverse
| John Constantine | Matt Ryan | | | |
| Clark Kent Superman^{96} | Brandon Routh | | | |
| Clark Kent^{167} | Tom Welling | | | |
| Lois Lane^{167} | Erica Durance | | | |
