= Black Lightning season 1 =

Black Lightning
- Season 1
- Promotional poster
- Starring: Cress Williams; China Anne McClain; Nafessa Williams; Christine Adams; Marvin "Krondon" Jones III; Damon Gupton; James Remar
- No. of episodes: 13

Release
- Original network: The CW
- Original release: January 16 – April 17, 2018

Season chronology
- Next → Season 2

The first season of the American television series Black Lightning, which is based on the DC Comics character Jefferson Pierce / Black Lightning, premiered on The CW on January 16, 2018, and ran for 13 episodes until April 17, 2018. The season was produced by Berlanti Productions, Akil Productions, Warner Bros. Television, and DC Entertainment. It was ordered in May 2017 and production began that September, with Salim Akil serving as showrunner.

The season introduces Jefferson Pierce, a high school principal who retired from his superhero identity Black Lightning nine years prior after seeing the effects it had on his family, as he is forced to become a hero again when the rise of the local gang called The 100 leads to increased crime and corruption in his community of Freeland. Cress Williams stars as Jefferson, along with principal cast members China Anne McClain, Nafessa Williams, Christine Adams, Marvin "Krondon" Jones III, Damon Gupton, and James Remar.

== Episodes ==
Black Lightning, season 1 episodes
No. overall	No. in season	Title	Directed by	Written by	Original release date	U.S. viewers (millions)
1	1	"The Resurrection"	Salim Akil	Salim Akil	January 16, 2018	2.31
After his older daughter Anissa is arrested for protesting, high school principal and retired superhero Jefferson Pierce is again pulled over for a crime he did not commit. The last straw comes when his youngest daughter Jennifer gets in trouble at a club owned by a gang called "The 100" and he is forced to use his powers to rescue her. Peter Gambi, his mentor and friend, urges him to become Black Lightning again, but Jefferson refuses to break the promise he made to his ex-wife, Lynn, to give up heroics in hopes of reconciling with her. A 100 gangbanger named Will and his friends abduct Jennifer and Anissa despite an agreement between Jefferson and the gang. Lynn temporarily frees him from his promise in order to save their daughters. With Gambi's help, he rescues the girls from the 100 at the Seahorse Motel. However, he is unable to find Will's boss Lala. After being brought to the head of the 100, Tobias Whale, by his two underlings Syonide and Joey Toledo, Lala is instructed to kill Black Lightning. Anissa's trauma activates her own powers, causing her to break a sink in half.
2	2	"Lawanda: The Book of Hope"	Oz Scott	Salim Akil	January 23, 2018	1.94
Jefferson assures Lynn that he is giving up his Black Lightning identity for good. However, he learns that the 100 are still running prostitutes at the Seahorse Motel and that his daughters are being targeted as witnesses. Jefferson asks Gambi to help him find Lala by hacking the police's database. Anissa's girlfriend offers to get her a therapist. Will escapes police custody, but is captured and executed by Lala. Lawanda, a former student of Jefferson's, tries to free her daughter from the grip of the 100 and he promises to help her. Lawanda is killed when she confronts Lala at the Seahorse Motel. Blaming himself for her death, Jefferson throws aside his concerns and prepares to go after the 100. Lynn visits Gambi and asks him to convince her husband otherwise, but he refuses. Using information from Will's recovered phone, Jefferson suits up and storms the hotel where Lala is hiding, beating him severely just before the police arrive to arrest him. While out shopping, Anissa subdues a robber with her powers. Using his connections with Deputy Chief Zeke Cayman after the Seahorse Motel was shut down, Tobias gets access to Lala's cell and strangles him with only one hand.
3	3	"Lawanda: The Book of Burial"	Mark Tonderai	Jan Nash	January 30, 2018	2.21
Following Lawanda's death, Reverend Holt plans to orchestrate a peace march in light of the 100's crime waves, much to the dismay of Jefferson and Inspector Henderson. Anissa meets Grace Choi and experiments with her new abilities. Tobias talks with Lady Eve and instructs his minions to massacre the peace march in exchange for Lala's place in the ranks. Though Black Lightning succeeds in stopping the assailant, Tobias is nearby as Syonide shoots Reverend Holt. The bullet goes through Reverend Holt and hits Khalil, Jennifer's boyfriend. At the hospital, Jefferson sees the mixed news about the opinions of Black Lightning from the peace marchers and Inspector Henderson. At the tailor shop, Gambi deletes evidence that Tobias was the one responsible for the reverend and Khalil being shot. Back at the hospital, Lynn assures Anissa that she will be there for her. Jefferson and Jennifer tell them that Reverend Holt is doing well but Khalil won't walk again. As Jefferson embraces his family, he continues to see the news about Black Lightning as other peace marchers praise his heroic actions.
4	4	"Black Jesus"	Michael Schultz	Pat Charles	February 6, 2018	1.88
One of Jefferson's students, Bernard, almost overdoses on a new strength-enhancing street drug, Green Light. Jefferson is forced to use his powers to knock him out. The school board wants Bernard expelled but lets him stay when Jefferson cedes final authority over student matters to the board. Gambi and Jefferson track Green Light to a mid-level dealer named Two Bits, an old friend of Jefferson's. When he dismisses Jefferson, Black Lightning gets him to reveal the location of a warehouse. Anissa and Grace are confronted outside a bar and Anissa uses her strength on the two thugs. Gambi erases the security footage, but keeps a photo of Anissa's footprint. Black Lightning saves Bernard from a drug den and Jefferson puts him in rehab. Jennifer quits track to focus on supporting Khalil. Lady Eve gets impatient with Tobias, who entered the criminal world after being forced out of city council for supposedly killing Black Lightning. Tobias has Joey Toledo murder the morgue doctor who told him Black Lighting was dead. Tobias' sister Tori arrives and proposes turning the people against Black Lightning. Tobias pays Khalil's medical bills and tells him that it's Black Lightning's fault he'll never walk again.
5	5	"And Then the Devil Brought the Plague: The Book of Green Light"	Rose Troche	Adam Giaudrone	February 13, 2018	1.81
Gambi alters Black Lightning's suit for flight as Jefferson experiences severe headaches. Tobias visits Gambi, looking for Black Lightning's identity, but Gambi denies knowing and tells Tobias that he's breaking their deal by coming to him. Black Lightning tracks Green Light to Joey Toledo. Jennifer defends herself against two girls at a skating rink. While Jefferson and Lynn take responsibility upon being confronted by one of the girls' parents, they are impressed with Jennifer. Tori tells Tobias he needs to finally deal with their abusive father, Eldridge. Now an old man, Tobias breaks his father's back and convinces Tori to let him die. Anissa discovers that, decades ago, her grandfather, reporter Alvin Pierce, had a story on the disappearance of nine enhanced teenagers. The newspaper wouldn't print the story and Alvin was murdered a week later. Anissa visits the paper's editor who says "they" are still watching. Nevertheless, he gives her some files and Anissa puts together a suit and explores a storage unit. On a tip from Inspector Henderson, Black Lightning confronts Toledo, but his headaches incapacitate him, allowing Toledo to escape as he vows to Black Lightning that Tobias will kill him.
6	6	"Three Sevens: The Book of Thunder"	Benny Boom	Charles Holland	February 27, 2018	1.64
Joey Toledo contacts Deputy Chief Cayman and Gambi picks up Black Lightning before the police can find him. The next day, Jefferson deals with Anissa getting in trouble with the police in relation to vandalism of a Confederate general's statue, as well as Vice Principal Kara Fowdy showing cyber-bullying videos about Jennifer. Meanwhile, Lynn compares the brain scans of those on Green Light and Black Lightning. While Black Lightning prepares for a confrontation with Tobias, Anissa uses her powers to destroy the Confederate general's statue after she learns that someone was killed over it. Afterwards, Anissa contacts Lynn to reveal her powers. Due to an attack at the hospital, Black Lightning cancels his planned attack on Tobias. Anissa shows up and fights off the thieves; Black Lightning battles and injures her, thinking that she was attacking Lynn. After realizing who she is, Lynn and Jefferson call Gambi for help. Gambi visits Lady Eve, having trained her, and makes a deal to keep the Pierce family off-limits to the 100, who want to stop Lynn's research. Meanwhile, Khalil takes up Tobias's offer to walk again. Anissa awakes and discovers that her father is Black Lightning.
7	7	"Equinox: The Book of Fate"	Bille Woodruff	Lamont Magee	March 6, 2018	1.46
Since the discovery of Anissa's metahuman powers, Lynn has been examining her and discovers that Anissa also has accelerated healing powers. Gambi comes clean to Jefferson about not telling him that Tobias is back in town. Investigating the break-in at the hospital, Inspector Henderson gets the description of the criminals responsible and believes the 100 are responsible. He also grows suspicious that they have targeted Jefferson's daughters and ex-wife. After visiting Lady Eve about Tobias, a disguised Gambi enters Tobias' club and kills Toledo to make Tobias fall in line. Despite not wanting Anissa to put herself in danger, Lynn asks Gambi to make a suit for Anissa. Black Lightning fights Tobias and his henchmen at his club, which results in Tobias getting wounded and Tori accidentally getting killed by a stray bullet. During this time, Tobias' henchmen use special electrical guns to kill Lady Eve and her minions. After a talk with Anissa, Black Lightning gets a call from Henderson believing he killed Lady Eve. In the final scene, Lala is in a hotel room as he is brought back to life with Lawanda's head tattooed on his chest.
8	8	"The Book of Revelations"	Tanya Hamilton	Jan Nash	March 13, 2018	1.45
Two henchmen are surprised to see Lala back from the dead. Lawanda talks to him, seductively encouraging violence. Gambi meets with A.S.A. member Martin Proctor, who sees Black Lightning as a threat to the Freeland experiment and wants him dead. Examining Lady Eve's body, Jefferson and Anissa trace the weapon's radiation; finding it and the body of Lady Eve's killer. Meanwhile, Jennifer is startled at school, causing her to unlock her own electrical powers. After calling Henderson, Jefferson and Anissa stake out the site to observe the police investigation. When a man in civilian clothes arrives instead, Jefferson sneaks up on him. As the man picks up the weapon, Anissa sees that it is about to explode and activates her powers to shield her father. Jefferson suspects the 100 intercepted his call to Henderson. Lynn finds that Green Light was similar to a vaccine that was found in Alvin Pierce's locker from 30 years ago. Gambi admits that his real name is Peter Esposito and that he withheld information to protect Jefferson and his family from the A.S.A., who made the vaccine and hunt metahumans. Jefferson warns Gambi to stay away from his family. Jennifer confides in Anissa about her electrical powers.
9	9	"The Book of Little Black Lies"	Tawnia McKiernan	Keli Goff	March 20, 2018	1.55
Anissa reveals her own powers and the fact that their father is Black Lightning to Jennifer, which leaves Jennifer feeling betrayed. Three separate investigations of Inspector Henderson into the corrupt police officers, Gambi into the electrical weapons, and Jefferson and Anissa into Green Light from Alvin's research all lead to the same lab where the drug is currently being manufactured. Gambi gives Anissa her costume as Thunder and says he made a mistake in keeping secrets, but that he was just trying to protect the ones he loves. With help from her mother, Jennifer is able to see why her parents lied but doesn't want to save the world, mourning her loss of her chance at a normal life. Black Lightning and Thunder attack the Green Light lab together and Inspector Henderson is able to make a few arrests before they blow it up. A.S.A. agents attack with weapons to disable Black Lightning's powers, but Thunder saves him. At home, Jennifer is able to forgive her father who promises to be honest with her from now on as they watch The Princess and the Frog.
10	10	"Sins of the Father: The Book of Redemption"	Eric Laneuville	Pat Charles	March 27, 2018	1.55
Thunder investigates Gambi's tip and finds that the kids from 30 years ago are still alive. When she brings Black Lightning to the lab, it's empty and they fight off A.S.A. agents again. Two Bits sees one of Jefferson's students display powers and get kidnapped, telling Jefferson. Meanwhile, Lala begins seeing Will, now also tattooed on his chest, as a ghost. He also exhibits increased strength, which he uses to take over the 100 while planning revenge on Tobias. Jennifer flares up with electricity during an argument with Anissa. Lynn discovers that while Jefferson merely manipulates electricity, Jennifer can generate it. Martin Proctor and the A.S.A. kidnap and torture Gambi, demanding Black Lightning's identity, and take Jefferson away while he mentors a child to get Gambi to talk. Jefferson uses his powers, allowing Gambi to escape. Gambi begins healing in his basement base and the Pierce family hides in Alvin's old house. Gambi tells Jefferson to find the new A.S.A. spotter in the community that finds kids with powers. At the new location of the stasis pods holding the kids, Proctor has realized that Jefferson is Black Lightning and informs Vice Principal Fowdy, who is the new spotter.
11	11	"Black Jesus: The Book of Crucifixion"	Michael Schultz	Melora Rivera	April 3, 2018	1.50
Black Lightning and Thunder raid another location and find that the bodies have been moved again. Vice Principal Kara Fowdy tells a scientist to keep an eye on the stasis pods stable, but one teenager from 30 years ago dies. From the shadows, Fowdy instructs Deputy Chief Cayman to have Jefferson framed for possession of Green Light. In an online discussion with her bosses, Fowdy is told that the federal agents will take Jefferson to the black site to determine if he is Black Lightning. While Lynn tries to find a lawyer that can defend Jefferson, Henderson visits Jefferson's cell, as he acts out an interrogation with Jefferson by talking about why his daughters were kidnapped by Lala. Thanks to Gambi, Thunder runs after his remote-controlled car using a hologram of Black Lightning; to fool everyone into believing Jefferson cannot be Black Lightning. Henderson is able to catch Cayman's accomplice Detective Glennon and convinces him to snitch on his superior. Henderson has Jefferson released and arrests Cayman for his corruption. Jefferson is exonerated and Henderson is sworn in as the new Deputy Chief of Police. Gambi joins the Pierce family for dinner to celebrate Jefferson's exoneration.
12	12	"The Resurrection and the Light: The Book of Pain"	Oz Scott	Jan Nash & Adam Giaudrone	April 10, 2018	1.54
After recuperating, Tobias is told by Martin Proctor to capture Black Lightning alive. To aid in this mission, Khalil emerges where he was given a spinal implant to help him walk again. Gambi confronts a weapon maker named Thomas Hildago for information about Proctor. While Hildago finds the information, he is confronted by Lala. Meanwhile, Lynn works to help Jennifer with her condition. Under orders of Tobias, Khalil as "Painkiller" attacks Jefferson High using paralysis needles based from a toxin his implant now creates; to draw out Black Lightning so that they can find out who he is. When Black Lightning confronts Khalil, Tobias joins the fight. As Jennifer works to get control of her abilities, Thunder faces off against Syonide. As Tobias restrains Black Lightning, Khalil does a strike that stops Black Lightning's heart, for which Tobias reprimands him. Syonide covers their escape as Jennifer resuscitates Black Lightning. The family retreats to a wooded cabin in North Freeland and Gambi cloaks them from tracking. Following the incident at the school, Proctor tells Kara Fowdry to find Black Lightning. Meanwhile, Lala is brought to Tobias by Syonide. Tobias places Lala under his control using a mystical phrase and plans on taking out Proctor next.
13	13	"Shadow of Death: The Book of War"	Salim Akil	Charles D. Holland	April 17, 2018	1.68
Near death, Jefferson's late father Alvin motivates him to wake up. When he does, his powers are gone. With the metahuman occupants dying, Martin Proctor demands living metahuman DNA from Tobias, who sends Lala to him with a bomb. Tobias reveals that he revived Lala and that the tattoos and ghosts of his victims are side effects of his revival. As Proctor sends agents to the cabin, Inspector Henderson gets word and the police pursue. Jennifer restores her father's powers, increasing their chances of survival against the A.S.A. agents and evasion of the police. Tobias' group attacks the A.S.A. headquarters and only Proctor is able to escape. The Pierce family confronts Proctor and Gambi, realizing he is running a rogue operation, kills him. When the scientist states that he needs the briefcase to deal with the pods' inhabitants, Lynn states that she knows someone who can help them. The details of the A.S.A.'s experiments are exposed to the media, causing a government scandal. The public recognizes Black Lightning and Thunder as public heroes for having stopped the rogue government conspiracy. Tobias opens Proctor's briefcase using his severed thumbs obtained by his coroner ally and Syonide; this provides Tobias the means he needs to eliminate Black Lightning.

== Cast and characters ==
=== Main ===
- Cress Williams as Jefferson Pierce / Black Lightning
- China Anne McClain as Jennifer Pierce
- Nafessa Williams as Anissa Pierce / Thunder
- Christine Adams as Lynn Stewart
- Marvin "Krondon" Jones III as Tobias Whale
- Damon Gupton as Billy Henderson
- James Remar as Peter Gambi

=== Recurring ===
- Dabier as Will
- Skye P. Marshall as Kara Fowdy
- Will Catlett as Latavius "Lala" Johnson / Tattoo Man
- Charlbi Dean as Syonide
- Eric Mendenhall as Joey Toledo
- Kyanna Simone Simpson as Kiesha
- Caleb Thomas as Malik
- Amanda Davis as Joan Lincoln
- Jordan Calloway as Khalil Payne / Painkiller
- Tracey Bonner as Lawanda White
- Anthony Reynolds as Deputy Chief Zeke Cayman
- Jill Scott as Evelyn Stillwater-Ferguson / Lady Eve
- Edwina Findley as Tori Whale
- Gregg Henry as Martin Proctor

=== Guest ===
- Roland S. Martin as himself
- Senator Nina Turner as herself
- Fallyn Brown as young Jennifer Pierce
- Clifton Powell as Reverend Jeremiah Holt
- Shein Mompremier as Chenoa
- Chantal Thuy as Grace Choi
- Jason Louder as Frank "Two-Bits" Tanner
- Yolanda T. Ross as Nichelle Payne
- Antonio Fargas as David Poe
- Keith Arthur Bolden as Alvin Pierce
- Kaden Washington Lewis as young Jefferson Pierce

== Production ==
=== Development ===
In September 2016, after going through several incarnations and various stages of development for over a year, Mara Brock Akil, her husband Salim Akil, and perennial Warner Bros. Television producer Greg Berlanti began pitching Black Lightning to television networks. The Akils wrote the script while serving as executive producers alongside Berlanti and his frequent collaborator Sarah Schechter. A week later, the project landed at Fox with a pilot production commitment. In February 2017, Fox opted to not go forward with the pilot, deciding that it was "not a good fit into its already crowded genre drama space" and the project was subsequently shopped to other networks. As the home to several of Berlanti's other television ventures, The CW emerged as the network that was likely to realize the series. The following day, The CW officially ordered a pilot for Black Lightning. The original pilot script that had been written for Fox was discarded and instead, a short presentation was shot ahead of the network's final decisions regarding pickup orders. The CW officially ordered Black Lightning to series on May 10, 2017, with Salim Akil to serve as showrunner. On April 2, 2018, a month after production on the first season had concluded, The CW renewed the series for a second season.

=== Writing ===
In writing the first season, Salim Akil stated that he was most inspired by the original run of Black Lightning comic books and that Black Lightning being a black father who defies the "deadbeat stereotype" was part of the reason for the Akil's wanting to tell his story. "That image of a father saving his daughters, protecting his family, protecting his school, protecting his community, it is happening, but it's not the narrative [on most shows and movies]," said Mara Brock Akil. Salim Akil added, "Jefferson Pierce is the epitome of what black men are: He loves his wife, his children, and the community." He described Jefferson and his family as "the Obamas of the superhero world" and commented that "[t]heir powers, like their race, is only part of who they are." Black Lightning utilizes a predominantly African-American writing staff to have an "authentic black voice" to support its setting and characters. Salim Akil shared that the writers are not all African-American but "have either lived this life or know someone who has." The cast additionally serve to maximize the series' authenticity because, according to the showrunner, "They know what the language feels like in their own community."

Showrunner Akil compared the duality of Jefferson Pierce and his alter ego Black Lightning to the duality of Martin Luther King Jr. and Malcolm X. He said that Jefferson takes after King, where he "would prefer to educate and to love and to be peaceful, but [he understands] that there's a different side." The Black Lightning side of him, in turn, favors the philosophies of Malcolm X, and believes that, "There are some things that I have to do and react to in a way that I'm not going to turn the other cheek." As a character-driven family drama, Salim Akil revealed that Black Lightning would not follow the villain of the week format typical of many superhero television series because he wanted "to explore the characters, even the villains" and felt that "one of the most interesting characters right now from a storytelling standpoint is Tobias [Whale]. His hatred for himself and for others comes from a real place, so we want to know why he's like that." Discussing the character Anissa Pierce, Black Lightning's daughter and the first black lesbian superhero on television, the Akils indicated that the writers would not be treating LGBTQ representation as a "special issue" but that such characters would be included and depicted "the way anyone would be included in life."

Salim Akil noted that topics such as the Black Lives Matter movement and other issues concerning race relations and police brutality would be addressed, but stressed that, "This is an American story, this is not a black story. We're going to be culturally specific, but universal in our themes so everyone can see themselves in these stories." He further explained, "I didn't want to be too fantastical because so many people out there are suffering and I felt like they needed a hero," on the decision to incorporate real-life societal issues into the narrative. Akil emphasized his desire for the audience "to be concerned about what's going on [in African-American communities.] I wanted people in those areas to feel like there was someone who was thinking about them and so I wanted the show to reflect that." Salim Akil likened the narrative of the first season to the story of the Tuskegee experiment. "What I wanted to do was have an arc about black male paranoia and African-American paranoia. So we start in the black community, fighting the gangs. And then this drug is introduced, and everyone's questioning where the drug comes from, and we start to follow the trail of where it comes from [...] and see oh, this stuff isn't coming from the low-level gang members."

=== Casting ===
On February 24, 2017, Cress Williams was announced in the lead role of Jefferson Pierce / Black Lightning. On March 2, China Anne McClain and Nafessa Williams were cast as Jefferson's daughters, Jennifer Pierce and Anissa Pierce, respectively. Later that same month on March 10, it was reported that Christine Adams has been cast as Lynn Stewart, Jefferson's ex-wife. At the 2017 San Diego Comic-Con on July 22, it was revealed that James Remar and Damon Gupton had joined the main cast as Jefferson's oldest friend Peter Gambi and unlikely ally Inspector William "Bill" Henderson, respectively. On August 10, rapper Marvin "Krondon" Jones III was added as a series regular, landing the role of main antagonist Tobias Whale.

On September 26, 2017, it was announced that Kyanna Simone Simpson would recur as Kiesha, Henderson's daughter and Jennifer's best friend. On October 5, it was reported that Jill Scott had been cast as Lady Eve. Later that month on October 12, Edwina Findley also joined the cast in a recurring capacity as Tori Whale, Tobias' younger sister. Chantal Thuy was added to the recurring cast as Grace Choi that same month on October 30, though she ultimately appeared in only two episodes of the series' first season. On December 14, Shein Mompremier was reportedly cast as Chenoa. On January 16, 2018, it was revealed that Skye P. Marshall had been cast in a recurring role as Ms. Fowdy, the vice principal of Garfield High School.

=== Design ===
Black Lightning's costume was designed by Laura Jean Shannon. While the suit's design is meant to invoke protection from the character's vulnerabilities such as his age, and bullets in particular, Salim Akil stated that there were "a lot of iterations" of the Black Lightning costume, and that "at one point I had covered his face and his eyes, but what was more important to me was the emotion, and you need to see that. You need to see his eyes when his daughters have a gun pointed at them." A number of journalists noted similarities between the first superhero costume donned by Anissa Pierce, featuring a pink, purple, and blue color scheme with gold and black accents and a blonde wig, and the Thunder costume of the 2003 Outsiders comic book run. Shannon also designed the final Thunder costume, which was made from a sculpted armor material to stretch to the performer's comfort and serves as an homage to the most recent costume worn by Thunder in the comic books.

=== Filming ===
Filming for the short presentation that was given to The CW took place in March 2017 in Atlanta, Georgia. Instead of a full traditional pilot, only about three to nine minutes of footage was used for the eight-to-twelve minute presentation, which was later cut into the series' first trailer. Production for the season officially began on September 7, 2017, in Atlanta. Filming for the first season concluded on March 3, 2018.

=== Music ===
As the music supervisor for Black Lightning, Kier Lehman selected the season's featured songs along with the Akils. Kurt Farquhar composed the score for the season, which he created by "combining elements of trap hip-hop, orchestral scoring, and a liberal use of live voice." The rapper Godholly, who is the son of showrunner Salim Akil, provided original music for the season, including tracks such as "Black Lightning" from the main title sequence. Following the series premiere, the tracks "Black Lightning" and "Power" from Godholly were made available on iTunes, Amazon, and other digital music sites. Additional songs created for the season by Godholly include "Welcome to Freeland" from the second episode, "Green Light" from the fourth episode, "Can't Go" from the eighth episode, and "Thunder" from the ninth episode.

== Release ==
Home media releases for Black Lightning, season 1
Episodes	Originally aired			DVD and Blu-ray release dates		
Episodes	First aired	Last aired	Timeslot (EST)	Region 1	Region 2	Region 4
13	January 16, 2018	April 17, 2018	Tuesday 9:00 pm	July 26, 2018	January 28, 2019	2018

=== Broadcast ===
Black Lightning began airing on The CW in the United States as a mid-season entry on January 16, 2018, during the 2017–18 television season. The first season, consisting of 13 episodes, aired on Tuesdays at 9:00pm following The Flash and concluded its run on April 17, 2018.

=== Home media ===
Having acquired the international distribution and streaming rights for Black Lightning, Netflix aired new episodes of the season weekly in regions outside of the United States, including Canada, Australia, New Zealand, and the United Kingdom. The season was released in its entirety on Netflix in the United States on April 25, 2018, one week after the season finale aired on The CW.

The complete first season of Black Lightning was released on Blu-ray and DVD in Region 1 on June 26, 2018, in Region 2 on January 28, 2019, and in Region 4 in 2018. The set also features extra content including the series' 2017 San Diego Comic-Con panel, new featurettes, deleted scenes, and a gag reel.

=== Marketing ===
On March 29, 2017, The CW released the first promotional image of Cress Williams as Jefferson Pierce in his official Black Lightning superhero costume. On May 18, the first trailer for the series was released. The main cast of the season that were confirmed at the time, as well as executive producers Salim Akil and Mara Brock Akil attended the 2017 San Diego Comic-Con on July 22 to promote the season. On December 12, The CW released key art for the series in the form of the season's first promotional poster featuring Williams, China Anne McClain, and Nafessa Williams as their characters. On January 4, 2018, The CW and Warner Bros Television released the first look at Nafessa Williams as Anissa Pierce in her official Thunder superhero costume. On March 25, the producers and writers of the season attended the 2018 WonderCon and screened the episode "Sins of the Father: The Book of Redemption" at their panel ahead of its official debut on The CW.

== Reception ==
=== Ratings ===
Viewership and ratings per episode of Black Lightning season 1
No.	Title	Air date	Rating/share (18–49)	Viewers (millions)	DVR (18–49)	DVR viewers (millions)	Total (18–49)	Total viewers (millions)
1	"The Resurrection"	January 16, 2018	0.8/3	2.31	—N/a	1.32	—N/a	3.63
2	"Lawanda: The Book of Hope"	January 23, 2018	0.6/2	1.94	0.7	1.54	1.3	3.48
3	"Lawanda: The Book of Burial"	January 30, 2018	0.8/3	2.21	0.6	1.54	1.4	3.77
4	"Black Jesus"	February 6, 2018	0.6/2	1.88	0.6	1.39	1.2	3.27
5	"And Then the Devil Brought the Plague: The Book of Green Light"	February 13, 2018	0.5/2	1.81	—N/a	—N/a	—N/a	—N/a
6	"Three Sevens: The Book of Thunder"	February 27, 2018	0.5/2	1.64	0.5	1.17	1.0	2.80
7	"Equinox: The Book of Fate"	March 6, 2018	0.5/2	1.46	0.4	1.03	0.9	2.48
8	"The Book of Revelations"	March 13, 2018	0.5/2	1.45	0.4	0.96	0.9	2.41
9	"The Book of Little Black Lies"	March 20, 2018	0.5/2	1.55	0.4	0.91	0.9	2.47
10	"Sins of the Father: The Book of Redemption"	March 27, 2018	0.5/2	1.55	0.4	0.92	0.9	2.47
11	"Black Jesus: The Book of Crucifixion"	April 3, 2018	0.5/2	1.50	0.3	0.83	0.8	2.33
12	"The Resurrection and the Light: The Book of Pain"	April 10, 2018	0.5/2	1.54	0.3	0.86	0.8	2.40
13	"Shadow of Death: The Book of War"	April 17, 2018	0.5/2	1.68	0.4	0.83	0.9	2.51

=== Critical response ===
Black Lightning season 1: Critical reception by episode
Season 1 (2018): Percentage of positive critics' reviews tracked by the website Rotten Tomatoes

The first season of Black Lightning debuted to critical acclaim. On the review aggregation website Rotten Tomatoes, the season holds a 96% approval rating, with an average rating of 8.37/10, based on 194 reviews. The website's critic consensus reads: "Black Lightning doesn't reinvent superhero TV, but it does give the genre a necessary jolt with real-world plots, scary new villains, and a star-making performance from Cress Williams." Metacritic, which uses a weighted average, assigned the season a score of 79 out of 100, based on reviews from 25 critics.

Kyle Fowle of The A.V. Club praised the series premiere for its "nuanced storytelling" and gave the episode a "B+" grade. He wrote, "Black Lightning is immediately established as something unique. It's not just the obvious stuff, like the nearly all-black cast or the fact that the series premiere isn't part of a drawn-out origin story. Rather, the difference is in the storytelling. Where Arrow and The Flash felt immediately part of a large, complicated universe, Black Lightning is much more intimate." Reviewing for Entertainment Weekly, Dana Schwartz gave the premiere episode an "A−" grade, adding, "The Pierce family dynamic is so compelling that even if Jefferson Pierce had no powers beyond great motivational speeches, this show would be a worthwhile watch. Black Lightning balances humor with all-too-necessary social commentary [...] to make a refreshing addition to the superhero TV pantheon." Reviewing the first two episodes of the season, The Hollywood Reporter's Daniel Fienberg commended the series for its "solid action scenes, bass-pumping soundtrack, stylish treatment of Black Lightning's sizzling powers and character pragmatism." He echoed praise for the series' ability to "stand alone in welcome ways" and described the premiere episode as "smart and relevant and full of an attitude that's all its own." Fienberg also lauded the complexity of the characters and the performances of the cast, particularly that of series star Cress Williams.

Fienberg felt that the second episode slipped in quality compared to the first, in part due to some "painfully tin-eared" dialogue and an underdeveloped setting, but that, "in the Akils, Black Lightning has creators with a specific vision; that in Williams it has a leading man capable of carrying a variety of story approaches; and that as long as it can resist the need to tie in with The CW's other superhero properties, it has a lot of potential as a unique stand-alone." Reviewing the first four episodes of the series, The Atlantic's Pilot Viruet wrote, "There's an authenticity to the series—it's neither too pulpy nor too preachy—that's heightened by the strong performances from its predominantly black cast, particularly from Williams, who anchors the show's many conflicts." Concluding, he added that, "like all superhero shows, [the series] can sometimes feel too crowded or uneven. But Black Lightning's greatest success so far is how it has surveyed the different ways black people tackle problems in their own backyards." Nafessa Williams' portrayal of Anissa Pierce, Black Lightning's eldest daughter who becomes the superhero Thunder, also drew attention and praise from critics. As the first black lesbian superhero on television, critics applauded the character's social activism and action scenes, as well as for being a "complex" and "fully realized" character outside of her superhero identity.

Again reviewing for The A.V. Club, Fowle gave the finale an "A" grade, writing that the episode was "tonally bold, easily moving between being funny and politically poignant," while also setting up "plenty of intrigue" for next season. He felt that the "imperfect moments" did not detract from the "overall assuredness" of the episode, which he described as, "about as good a first season finale as you'll find." Fowle concluded that the episode was a "confident, compelling, moving end to a season that boasted all those same qualities throughout." Allison Keene of Collider opined that the "outstanding" first season "effectively wove together the crime fighting and day jobs and the personal lives of the Pierce family, making sure that family always came first." However, she felt that a number of storylines were rushed toward the end of the season, such as Khalil's dark turn and the fates of villains other than Tobias Whale. Jesse Schedeen of IGN noted that the series' reduced episode count, focus on older superheroes and social issues, limited cast, and preservation of the main villain at the end of the season positively distinguished the series from other superhero programming. Reviewing for Revenge of the Fans, Adam Basciano gave the season finale an "A+" grade and, regarding the season as a whole, he wrote, "Black Lightning had a great first season. Consistent, compelling, character driven and action packed. [...] How Black Lightning can top itself next season, I don't know, but I'm anxious to see if it is up to the challenge."

=== Awards and nominations ===
Award nominations for Black Lightning, season 1
Year	Award	Category	Recipient(s) and nominee(s)	Result	Ref.
2018	People's Choice Award	Sci-Fi/Fantasy Show of 2018	Black Lightning	Shortlisted	
2018	Saturn Award	Best Superhero Television Series	Black Lightning	Nominated	
2018	Black Reel Award for Television	Outstanding Drama Series	Black Lightning	Won	
2018	Black Reel Award for Television	Outstanding Actor, Drama Series	Cress Williams	Nominated	
2018	Black Reel Award for Television	Outstanding Directing, Drama Series	Salim Akil ("The Resurrection")	Nominated	
2018	Black Reel Award for Television	Outstanding Guest Actress, Drama Series	Jill Scott	Nominated	
2018	Black Reel Award for Television	Outstanding Music	Kier Lehman	Nominated	
2018	Teen Choice Award	Choice Breakout TV Show	Black Lightning	Nominated	
2018	Teen Choice Award	Choice Breakout TV Star	Nafessa Williams	Nominated	
2019	NAACP Image Award	Outstanding Writing in a Drama Series	Patrick Joseph Charles ("Sins of the Father: The Book of Redemption")	Nominated	
