= Black Nerd Problems: Essays =

2021 essay collection by Black Nerd Problems

- Author: Black Nerd Problems; Omar Holmon; William Evans
- Language: English
- Subject: Pop culture Nerd culture
- Published: 2021
- Publisher: Gallery Books
- Publication place: United States of America
- Media type: Hardcover, paperback
- Pages: 304
- ISBN: 9781982150235

Black Nerd Problems (2021) is a collection of essays written by Black Nerd Problems, primarily Omar Holmon and William Evans. It was named a 2021 Goodreads Choice Award Nominee. The book has 48 entries, being a blend of new and archived takes from the BNP website, covering everything from the Marvel Cinematic Universe to “The Sobering Reality of Actual Black Nerd Problems."

== Development ==
The idea of a book based on the website was first suggested by the publisher, which had already been working with Evans on a poetry collection.

== Reception ==
The book was reviewed positively, and described as both humorous and introspective. It was nominated for a 2021 Goodreads Choice Award in Readers' Favorite Humor.
