= Tobias Whale =

Fictional character

- Tobias Whale as depicted in Who's Who: The Definitive Directory of the DC Universe #24 (February 1987). Art by Trevor Von Eeden.

Publication information
- Publisher: DC Comics
- First appearance: Black Lightning #1 (April 1977)
- Created by: Jenny Blake Isabella; Trevor Von Eeden

In-story information
- Alter ego: Tobias Whale
- Species: Human
- Place of origin: New Earth
- Team affiliations: The 100; Intergang; Kord Enterprises
- Notable aliases: The Great White Whale
- Abilities: Criminal mastermind Advanced hand-to-hand combatant Skilled harpooner

Tobias Whale is a supervillain appearing in American comic books published by DC Comics. He is the archenemy of Black Lightning.

Whale appears in the live-action Arrowverse series Black Lightning, portrayed by Marvin "Krondon" Jones III.

== Publication history ==
Created by Jenny Blake Isabella and Trevor Von Eeden, the character made his first appearance in Black Lightning #1 (April 1977).

Whale was originally depicted as an African-American man with albinism. Following the DC Rebirth relaunch, Whale is depicted as lacking albinism. In a 2017 interview with Black Nerd Problems, Isabella stated that Whale's new design was inspired by LeBron James and the Brow, a Dick Tracy villain who she was fond of.

== Fictional character biography ==
Tobias Whale is an African American kingpin with albinism, who works his way up from the rackets to head the Metropolis branch of the 100. A school teacher named Jefferson Pierce speaks out against the 100's drug trafficking, and, as a response, they make an example of one of his students: Earl Clifford. Joey Toledo leads his men into attacking Earl and hits him with a car. Seeking to avenge the murdered student and receiving help from his tailor friend Peter Gambi, Pierce becomes Black Lightning and attacks Toledo and his men. After defeating his henchmen, Toledo is grabbed by Black Lightning, who arranges for Toledo to meet him at Garfield High School's gymnasium to inform on the 100 to him.

When Black Lightning meets with Toledo, Malcolm Merlyn also appears after being hired by Toledo to kill Black Lightning. Their fight is crashed by Talia al Ghul and the League of Assassins, who are after Merlyn since he left the group after failing to kill Batman. The resulting battle ended with Toledo being killed by a League of Assassins operative. Afterwards, Pierce is so successful in avenging Earl's death that Tobias Whale is sent to jail.

After breaking out of prison some months later, Whale teams up with Syonide to distribute a new highly addictive drug. The drug's formula was supposedly in the possession of a woman named Violet Harper. Tobias sends Syonide to retrieve the formula. Unable to gain any information or find any trace of the formula, Syonide kills Violet. Violet is later revived when an Aurakle possesses her corpse and comes to be known as Halo. After learning of Violet's resurrection, Tobias assumed that she must have memorized the formula. Since Violet had no memories from before her death, a frustrated Syonide kills her parents during the Outsiders' fight with Whale's henchmen.

Whale returns in the miniseries Gotham Underground and has moved to Gotham City, where he is attempting to become the Capo di tutti capi boss of bosses following the death of Black Mask. After taking over the Galante and Odessa crime families, he ends up in a gang war with Intergang. They buy him out and make him the CEO of Kord Enterprises, which has become a front for Intergang's criminal activities.

Tobias Whale is reintroduced following The New 52, which rebooted DC's continuity. In the DC Rebirth relaunch, it is revealed that this version of Tobias Whale was Whale's unnamed nephew using his identity. The real Whale is reintroduced and depicted as lacking albinism. Whale respects his nephew enough as a blood relative to kill him personally.

== Powers and abilities ==
Tobias Whale does not possess any superhuman abilities but has strength and muscular prowess far exceeding that of a normal human being. He goes toe-to-toe against Black Lightning on the regular, relying solely on his physical strength and influence. Whale is a skilled hand-to-hand combatant, proficient in boxing, street fighting, and judo. He is notorious in the criminal underworld, is a skilled planner and a well-connected and influential politician. He uses Harpoons and Spearguns as his weapons of choice.

== Other versions ==
The pre-Zero Hour incarnation of Tobias Whale appears in Convergence, where he takes over the criminal underground of Metropolis after the city is isolated in a dome.

== In other media ==
=== Television ===
- Characters based on Tobias Whale appear in series set in the DC Animated Universe:
  - Edgar Mandragora, a character partially inspired by and resembling Whale, appears in the Batman Beyond episode "Mind Games", voiced by Brian Tochi. He is a psychic metahuman and member of the Brain Trust, a secret society of psychic metahumans who secretly kidnap children with similar gifts, claiming to their parents that they will help them. When Batman discovers their operations, Edgar lures him into a trap, but is defeated and arrested.
  - Edgar returns in The Zeta Project episode "Ro's Gift", voiced by John Rhys-Davies. Having escaped from prison by this time, he and fellow Brain Trust member Bombshell continue their operations until they are foiled by Rosalie Rowan and the children the Brain Trust had kidnapped and arrested once more.
  - A young Edgar and his father Steven Mandragora appear in the Justice League Unlimited episode "Double Date", with the latter voiced by Glenn Shadix. Steven is a crime lord with immense strength and endurance who killed Helena Bertinelli's parents when she was young, which led to her becoming the Huntress and joining the Justice League. After discovering he is in federal custody as an informant, Bertinelli sets out to kill him despite being ousted from the League. Upon reaching him amidst an escape attempt however, she relents due to Edgar and sees Steven put back in federal custody.
- Tobias Whale appears in Beware the Batman, voiced by Michael-Leon Wooley. This version is Gotham City's leading crime lord who employs criminals such as his lawyer and enforcer, Phosphorus Rex. In addition, Humphry Dumpler used to work as his accountant before Whale mounted a failed attempt on Dumpler's life, leading to him seeking revenge.
- Tobias Whale appears in Black Lightning, portrayed by Marvin "Krondon" Jones III. This version received his anti-aging serum from Dr. Helga Jace and is a former politician who rose through the ranks of Freeland's local government through corruption before he was brought down by Black Lightning's father, Alvin Pierce. After killing Alvin, Whale was removed from the government and became the leader of the 100 after receiving ownership from crime boss Lady Eve, with Joey Toledo and Syonide serving as enforcers and Whale's sister Tori (portrayed by Edwina Findley) as support. Throughout the series, Whale battles Black Lightning alongside different allies until he is eventually killed in battle against him.

=== Film ===
- Tobias Whale appears in Suicide Squad: Hell to Pay, voiced by Dave Fennoy. This version is a crime lord and underboss in the Black Mask Mob who is later killed by the Suicide Squad.
- Tobias Whale appears in Catwoman: Hunted, voiced by Keith David. This version is a member of Leviathan.

=== Video games ===
Tobias Whale appears as a character summon in Scribblenauts Unmasked: A DC Comics Adventure.
