= 100 (DC Comics) =

Fictional organized crime groups

The 100
- Booster Gold versus the 1,000, artist Dan Jurgens

Publication information
- Publisher: DC Comics
- First appearance: (10); Superman #665 (September 2007) (100); Superman's Girl Friend Lois Lane #105 (October 1970) (1,000); Booster Gold #2 (March 1986)
- Created by: (10); Kurt Busiek; Rick Leonardi (100); Robert Kanigher; Ross Andru (1,000); Dan Jurgens

In-story information
- Type of organization: Organized crime
- Leader(s): The 100; Tobias Whale; The 1,000; Henry Ballard
- Agent(s): The 100; Cyclotronic Man; Merlyn; Pajamas; Steel-Fist Feeny; Syonide (two different agents); The 1,000; Blackguard; Chiller; Doctor Shocker; Mindancer; Shockwave

The 100, The 10, and The 1,000 are a series of organized crime groups appearing in the American comic books published by DC Comics. The 100 debuted in Superman's Girl Friend Lois Lane #105 (October 1970) and were created by Robert Kanigher and Ross Andru. The 1,000 debuted in Booster Gold #2 (March 1986) and were created by Dan Jurgens. The 10 debuted in Superman #665 (September 2007) and were created by Kurt Busiek and Rick Leonardi. With their main area of operations being in Metropolis they have continually faced off against Metropolis superheroes such as Superman or Black Lightning.

The 100 made their live-action debut in the television series Black Lightning. Additionally, Blackguard from the 1,000 appeared in the DC Extended Universe film The Suicide Squad (2021), portrayed by Pete Davidson.

== Fictional team history ==
=== The 100 ===
The 100, formerly known as El Ciento (the one hundred), was founded by 71 men and women from across Europe who came together in Aragon, Spain in the year 1462, and named themselves El Ciento to honor their 29 dead allies. The surviving members of El Ciento combined various scientific, arcane and alchemical methods of life extension to gain immortality. At a later point in time, the group's members discovered that they had to maintain the land they lived on and feed on emotions to retain their immortality. They also learned how to become immaterial and possess human bodies. Though most members of El Ciento feed off human suffering, a few have been able to survive by feeding on positive emotions.

A member of El Ciento established himself in Metropolis's Southside, an area which would later be known as Suicide Slum. The 100 held a firm grip on the city's criminal underworld for years, indulging in crimes such as drug trafficking and racketeering. They later seem to have spread across the country with branches operating in other cities. The 100 battled foes like Black Lightning at the behest of the Metropolis section leader Tobias Whale.

=== The 10 ===
During Superman's early years in Metropolis, there was a smaller organization called the 10, with ties to Intergang. The group has no connection to the 100, but may have ties to the 1,000.

=== The 1,000 ===
Under the direction of Senator Henry Ballard, the 100 changed its name to the 1,000. They attempt to expand their reach to the Oval Office, with Ballard becoming a presidential candidate. This plan was thwarted and the 1,000 became the 100 again.

== Members ==
=== 100 Operatives ===
- Cyclotronic Man — Ned Creegan was accidentally subjected to an experimental light ray that gave him electrical abilities and made his skin transparent, leaving his skeleton visible. As "Bag O' Bones," Creegan fought Batman and Robin. Creegan later joined the 100 as Cyclotronic Man.
- Joey Toledo — A drug pusher, who was later killed by a League of Assassins operative.
- Johnny "Stitches" Denetto — A crime boss who worked for Tobias Whale until Whale peeled his face off. Denetto went on to join Intergang and was given a new face made by DeSaad.
- Merlyn — A mercenary archer, who was also a member of the League of Assassins.
- Pajamas — An unnamed Asian martial artist who was nicknamed "Pajamas" by Black Lightning.
- Steel-Fist Feeny — Francis Feeny possesses a cybernetic right hand made of steel.
- Syonide — Syonide is a mercenary who was hired by Tobias Whale and the 100 to capture Black Lightning and Peter Gambi. He committed suicide after believing he had murdered Black Lightning.
- Syonide (second) — The second Syonide was female. She first succeeded the original as an agent of the 100 and fought the Outsiders. Later, she became a mercenary in her own right, sometimes working with Merlyn.
- Tobias Whale — Super-strong and tough albino enemy of Black Lightning. He is the leader of the 100's Metropolis branch.

=== 1,000 Operatives ===
- Henry Ballard — Senator Henry Ballard is the forward-thinking leader of the 1,000. He was later killed in battle against Booster Gold, Blackguard, and Thorn.
- Blackguard — An enforcer for the 1,000, who clashed with Booster Gold.
- Chiller — A shapeshifting super-assassin who nearly killed Ronald Reagan and George H. W. Bush at the behest of the 1,000.
- Doctor Shocker — Shocker serves the Director as a special interrogator. He uses a highly advanced device called a "Psi-tap" that can read and transcribe thoughts.
- Mindancer — A supervillain who can drain mental energy and project it as bolts of psionic force. She is second in command of the 1,000 behind Henry Ballard.
- Shockwave — A frequent agent of the 1,000, Arnold Pruett utilizes armor that gives him superhuman and the ability to generate powerful vibrations capable of leveling buildings.

== In other media ==
The 100 appears in Black Lightning, with Tobias Whale, Syonide, Joey Toledo, Latavius "Lala" Johnson, and Painkiller as prominent members. This version of the group operates in Freeland, with Whale as their leader after the gang was given to him by Lady Eve's bosses. In addition, some members of the Freeland Police Department are secretly on the 100's side. As of the fourth season, Lala has taken over leadership of the 100, while Whale runs for mayor.
