= Black Nerd Problems =

American pop culture website, founded 2014

- Editorial director: William H. Evans (2014–present)
- Categories: Entertainment journalism
- Publisher: BNP, LLC.
- Founder: Omar Holmon; William Evans
- Founded: 2014; 12 years ago
- Language: English
- Website: Official website

Black Nerd Problems is an American entertainment news website. Its tagline is "Diverse. Nerdy. Lit AF."

== History ==
Black Nerd Problems or ("BNP") debuted on May 15, 2014. Founding editors, Omar Holmon and William Evans, met in the summer of 2007. The two wanted to talk "nerdy stuff" and find other Black nerds who wanted to have a voice in the critique of pop culture. So, they created BNP as an editorial and informative website that focused on popular, nerd and geek culture from the perspective of people of color. Evans and Holmon were the primary contributors to the site's essays. Then, they added seven writers to help broaden the site’s coverage.

In a peak, monthly readership reached between 140,000 and 170,000 unique visitors.

On September 14, 2021, the founders published a book that is a collection of pop culture essays titled Black Nerd Problems: Essays. The book has 48 entries, being a blend of new and archived takes from the website, covering everything from the Marvel Cinematic Universe to “The Sobering Reality of Actual Black Nerd Problems." The book was released to positive reviews.

== Reception ==
Staffers from Black Nerd Problems are "Tomatometer-approved" as critics for Rotten Tomatoes.

BNP essay/review quotations have popped up on the covers of comic books, most notably Marvel’s Black Panther, and staffers have earned recognition at major comic conventions, like being panelists at the 2017 GeekGirlCon in Seattle.

== Media ==
=== Book ===
- Black Nerd Problems: Essays. New York: Gallery Books. 2021. ISBN 978-1-98-215023-5.

=== Podcasts ===
- This Week In Nerd News
- 2Nerds and an Actor

== Editors-in-chief ==
People who have held the title of editorial director (editor-in-chief):

- William H. Evans (2014–present)
