= Black Lightning =

Fictional character from DC Comics

- Textless cover of Black Lightning: Cold Dead Hands #1 (November 2017); Art by Clayton Henry

Publication information
- Publisher: DC Comics
- First appearance: Black Lightning #1 (April 1977)
- Created by: Jenny Blake Isabella with Trevor Von Eeden

In-story information
- Full name: Jefferson Michael Pierce
- Species: Metahuman
- Team affiliations: Outsiders; Justice League
- Notable aliases: Black Lightning
- Abilities: Manipulates electricity to various effects, including shooting lightning bolts, exerting electromagnetism, and deflecting attacks.; Highly skilled fighter in martial arts

Black Lightning (Jefferson Michael Pierce) is a superhero who appears in American comic books published by DC Comics. The character, created by writer Jenny Blake Isabella with artist Trevor Von Eeden, first appeared in Black Lightning #1 (April 1977), during the Bronze Age of Comic Books. Although his precise origin story has varied over the years, he is generally depicted as a metahuman superhero of Metropolis who uses the ability to generate and control electricity to defend his community – and the world – as Black Lightning. Although not the first black superhero to be featured in DC Comics stories, Black Lightning was DC's first African-American superhero to headline his own series.

In his earliest stories, Black Lightning was depicted as a schoolteacher from the crime-ridden Suicide Slum area of Metropolis who acquires electrical superpowers from a technologically advanced power belt that he put to use to clean up crime in his neighborhood. Over time, Pierce establishes himself as a successful superhero in the DC Universe, and later stories depict him as having "internalized" the belt's powers as a result of his latent metagene. Later retellings of Black Lightning's origins simplified his story by depicting him as a metahuman with the inborn ability to manipulate and generate electricity. The character later went on to father two superhero daughters, Thunder and Lightning, and as a founding member and the leader of the Outsiders superhero team.

DC originally commissioned Isabella to create its first black character following on from Isabella's successful work for Marvel Comics with Luke Cage. However, only 11 issues of the series were published before DC ran into financial trouble in 1978 which led them to cut back the majority of their titles. The character went on instead to be featured prominently in books like Justice League of America in DC's new slimmed-down offering of titles, exposing him to more readers, with the character being remembered for providing critical perspective on established superheroes like Batman and Superman. Early elements of the character were controversial, and later removed or toned down. For example, in early stories, he wore an afro wig and spoke in an exaggerated Harlem jive vernacular to disguise his secret identity.

For many years, Black Lightning did not feature in media adaptations of DC Comics stories, with the similar character Black Vulcan being created for DC's Super Friends cartoon in the 1970s to avoid the series making royalty payments to Isabella. Nevertheless, Black Lightning was clearly influential on other comic book writers, and "whether directly or indirectly," likely established the recognized trope of black superheroes commonly exhibit electricity-based superpowers, including later original characters such as Static. The character has been adapted into various media, including animated television series, video games, and comic strips. Cress Williams portrays Black Lightning in a self-titled series and the Arrowverse series The Flash and Legends of Tomorrow. Black Lightning had proven a popular character for DC and was ranked 85th overall on IGN's "Top 100 Comic Books Heroes" list in 2011.

== Creation ==
In her blog, Isabella wrote that the character's background as a teacher at his former high school was inspired by the sitcom Welcome Back, Kotter. The superhero name "Black Lightning" originated from a Wonder Woman cover displayed on Julius Schwartz's wall, in which she asks another superhero to "stop this black lightning before it splits that building in two". Isabella liked the reference to lightning and wrote: "The words 'black lightning' sounded cool to me in the era when so many movies included 'black' in their titles, so I decided that's what I would name my creation."

== Publication history ==
Black Lighting made his debut on Black Lightning #1 (April 1977). Art by Rich Buckler and Frank Springe.

The original candidate for DC Comics' first headlining black superhero was a character called the Black Bomber, a white racist who would turn into a black superhero under stress. Comics historian Don Markstein later described the character as "an insult to practically everybody with any point of view at all". When the editor who had approved the Black Bomber left the company before the character had seen print, Jenny Blake Isabella (whose previous writing experience included Luke Cage, a black Marvel Comics superhero with his own title) was asked to salvage the character. Isabella convinced editors to instead use her Black Lightning character, which she had been developing for some time.

Isabella wrote the first 10 issues of Black Lightning (before handing it over to Dennis O'Neil); Trevor Von Eeden designed the character's original costume, and drew the first 11 issues. Only one issue scripted by O'Neil came out before the series was canceled in 1978 as part of a general large-scale pruning of the company's superhero titles known as the DC Implosion. Issue #12 was published in Cancelled Comic Cavalcade and World's Finest Comics #260.

Black Lightning made a number of guest appearances in various titles over the next few years, including a string of issues of World's Finest Comics written by O'Neil, then shifted to Detective Comics and a two-part story in Justice League of America in which he declined an offer of membership. In 1983, with his powers restored, he regularly appeared again as a member of Batman's spinoff superhero team, the Outsiders. When The Outsiders ended, he returned to making occasional guest appearances.

In 1995, a new Black Lightning series began with art by Eddy Newell and again written by Jenny Blake Isabella, who was fired after the eighth issue and replaced with Australian writer Dave de Vries. The series was canceled five issues after Isabella left the title, the decision having been made before these issues had seen print. Isabella said she believes the editor replaced her with a newer writer to consolidate his position in the company.

A "Black Lightning: Year One" six-issue limited series, written by Jen Van Meter and illustrated by Cully Hamner saw a bi-weekly release in 2009, and was nominated for two Glyph Awards in 2010.

As part of the New 52, a revamped version of Black Lightning appeared in DC Universe Presents that was paired with the Blue Devil.

== Fictional character biography ==
Jefferson Pierce as Black Lighting, as he initially appeared in Black Lighting #1 (April 1977). Art by Trevor von Eeden (penciller), Frank Springer (inker), and Liz Berube (colorist).

=== Year One ===
A gold medal-winning Olympic decathlete, Jefferson Michael Pierce returned to his old neighborhood in the Southside (Suicide Slum) section of the city of Metropolis with his wife Lynn Stewart and his daughter Anissa to become the principal of Garfield High School. Southside, as it was once known, was where his father—renowned journalist Alvin Pierce—had been murdered. Guilt over this event was a factor in his decision to leave the city of Metropolis. Suicide Slum was being torn apart by a local organized criminal gang called the 100, shady corporations, and crooked local politicians like Tobias Whale. A family friend and tailor, Peter Gambi, had taught a much younger Jefferson how to suppress his inborn metahuman abilities so that he would not accidentally hurt any of the people he cared about. Upon his return, Gambi suggested to Jefferson that he should use his powers to help the neighborhood, and refers him to a plaque with the paraphrased Milo Sweetman quote "Justice, like lightning, should ever appear to some men hope, to other men fear". (The original text of which was "Justice, like lightning, ever should appear to few men's ruin, but to all men's fear. Of mortal justice if thou scorn the rod, believe and tremble, thou art judged of God".) Appalled by the public murder of his student Earl Clifford, Pierce tried to intervene on behalf of the schoolchildren but quickly learned that the 100 objected violently to any interference. Pierce adopts the costumed identity "Black Lightning" where he had the costume, mask, and wig made by Gambi.

Years later, he would tell fellow African-American superhero Mister Terrific that he chose the name Black Lightning because he "was the only one of us around" at the time, and he "wanted to make sure everyone knew who they were dealing with."

=== Outsiders ===
After his own series was cancelled, Black Lightning lost his electrical powers, but continued fighting without them. The loss eventually turned out to be psychosomatic, a symptom of a crisis of confidence resulting from the accidental death of a female bystander named Trina Shelton during an altercation between Black Lightning and some gun-wielding thugs. Batman, wanting to recruit him to rescue Lucius Fox in Markovia, helped him regain his powers; this eventually led him to join Batman's team, the Outsiders. During his time with the Outsiders, a group of villains called the Masters of Disaster captured Black Lightning at the behest of the parents of Trina Shelton to avenge the death of their daughter; however, upon learning that he still regretted what happened and was willing to be executed by them, they risked their lives to save him. In Invasion!, the Dominators detonated a Gene-Bomb that wreaked havoc with anyone possessing the metagene by making them lose control of their powers. After the breakup of the Outsiders, Black Lightning moved to Brick City to continue his solo career.

=== Secretary of Education ===
When Lex Luthor was elected President of the United States in 2000, he appointed Jefferson Pierce as Secretary of Education, with Pierce accepting as he concluded that he could do more good working within the system than outside it. He resigned amidst controversy over his "worst-kept secret in Washington" identity as Black Lightning and his alleged inadvertent killing of a criminally-minded corporate CEO, for which President Pete Ross (who had since succeeded Luthor) then pardoned him.

Making frequent guest appearances in several DC series, Pierce has appeared in Green Arrow (who had a one-night stand with his niece, a successful attorney named Joanna Pierce). Pierce helped the Green Arrow track down Dr. Light in the Green Arrow "Heading into the Light" story arc. He also appeared in the new Outsiders, of which his daughter, Anissa (using the alias Thunder), is a member. He came to fight the new Sabbac and help his daughter alongside Captain Marvel Jr. and the Outsiders. He had on an outfit that mixed his second outfit with the colors of the first. After teaming up with the Outsiders, incoming President Pete Ross asked him to resign as Secretary of Education, which he did.

At some point prior to his resignation, Pierce used his pull in Washington to deny the gangster Holocaust a permit to build a casino on Paris Island in Dakota. This would come back to haunt Pierce sometime later when the enraged Holocaust attacked him while he was giving the graduation speech at Ernest Hemingway High School.

=== Infinite Crisis ===
Black Lightning, cover detail, Final Crisis: Submit #1 (December 2008). Art by Matthew Clark.

In issue #5 of the Infinite Crisis storyline, it was shown that Black Lightning was one of the eight people Batman had considered to aid him in destroying the Brother Eye satellite, which controlled the OMACs. Booster Gold, who was not on the list of eight, but knew about the candidates from his knowledge of the future, contacted Lightning before Batman did, as historical data from the future had shown who had aided Batman. Lightning accepted, arriving at the Batcave to await orders. He then forged an uneasy yet effective alliance with Mister Terrific, combining their powers of electrical manipulation and invisibility technology to strike at Brother Eye from the inside.

After the third Secret Society of Super Villains was formed, Black Lightning began using his status as Lex Luthor's former Secretary of Education to gain information from supervillains.

=== Outsiders redux ===
In Outsiders vol. 3 #45, it was revealed that three years have passed since Jefferson's niece Joanna Pierce was murdered and that, upon initially learning of her death, Jefferson went after the corrupt businessman Martin Somers, the man who was responsible. He had intended to wound Somers with his lightning shot, but apparently ended up killing him. Jefferson turned himself in to the authorities. However, it is revealed that Deathstroke was responsible for Somers' death by firing a dart of toxin to Somers moments before Jefferson shot his lightning. Hence, he was dead before he hit the ground. Jason Todd discovered the truth while eavesdropping on the assassin's conversation with Lex Luthor (who was really Alexander Luthor Jr. in disguise) and contacted Nightwing with this information. When Nightwing and Anissa told Jefferson of this in prison, he disbelieved it and intended to pay for Somers' death. Anissa herself intended to break her father out of Iron Heights Prison. Upon learning from Todd that other inmates were about to carry out a contract hit on Pierce (whose identity as an inmate had leaked to unknown parties), the Outsiders resolved to assist her. They freed him from jail and, with the audio recording of Deathstroke's conversation, cleared his name.

=== Justice League of America ===
Years ago, the Green Arrow brought Black Lightning to the attention of the Justice League of America, who extended an offer of membership to Black Lightning. He turned down the offer, preferring to work as a loner and focus on street-level crime, though he did offer to become a reservist. Years later, when all of the JLA reservists were called in to fight a newly revived Amazo, Black Lighting was one of the heroes called, confirming that the League had accepted his offer. Black Lightning joins the JLA, once again appearing with a modified costume. He appears to be primarily based in Washington, D.C. again. Black Lightning assists the JLA with intelligence gathered from the criminal community. Many supervillains still believe he is working with Lex Luthor and are thus willing to cooperate with him. Jefferson also helps the team in a battle against Amazo. He was the first member of the League to respond to the recent attacks made by the Amazons of Themyscira, and he also saved the President of the United States in this event.

Black Lightning was the focus of the one-shot issue Final Crisis: Submit, in which he helped Tattooed Man and his family escape at the cost of his own freedom. He is subsequently shown in issue #4 of Final Crisis under Darkseid's thrall.

=== Outsiders ===
Alfred Pennyworth recruits Black Lightning into a new version of the Outsiders following an attack by Simon Hurt which left Thunder comatose. Unlike previous iterations of the team, these Outsiders must live "off the grid" and stay out of contact with friends and family for months at a time. It is confirmed that, due to this new commitment, Black Lightning has left the Justice League.

=== The New 52 ===
In DC's 2011 reboot of its continuity, The New 52, Black Lightning comes into conflict with Blue Devil over their confrontation of Tobias Whale's crime wave. He later made an appearance as a possible recruit for the Justice League.

=== Black Lightning: Cold Dead Hands ===
Black Lightning appeared in DC Rebirth in Detective Comics, and from there spun out into the series Batman & the Outsiders. Jenny Blake Isabella, the creator of Black Lightning, rebooted the character in a 2017 miniseries.

== Powers and abilities ==
Originally, Black Lightning had no innate powers, using a belt that allowed him to generate a force field and project electrical bolts. He was later retconned to be a metahuman.

Black Lightning can produce a vast amount of bioelectricity he can channel against his opponents to a variety of effects, from stunning to killing. With more effort, he can control the electromagnetic force-field generated by his power to use it as shield against incoming attacks and to ionise objects to throw them to enemies.

Having been a trained athlete and won three gold olympic medals. Raised on the "streets" Black Lightning was already a formidable hand to hand combatant but having experience as a superhero and training with the Batman he has become a formidable martial artist ranking among the best in the DC universe.

== Supporting characters ==
=== Family ===
Jefferson has had two daughters by his ex-wife Lynn Stewart, both of whom have followed in his footsteps and become superheroes. His oldest daughter, Anissa Pierce, has taken on the code name "Thunder" and served on an incarnation of his team the Outsiders. His 16-year-old, younger daughter Jennifer Pierce, was recruited by the Justice Society of America under the code name "Lightning". A version of Lightning first appeared in Kingdom Come, a 1996 miniseries published by DC Comics.

=== Enemies ===
Black Lightning's rogues' gallery consists of:

- 100 - A criminal organization.
  - Tobias Whale - Black Lightning's archenemy, a crime lord who heads up the Metropolis branch of the 100. Nicknamed "the Great White Whale" (which he hates).
  - Andrew Henderson - The son of Inspector Henderson who is a master of disguise.
  - Cyclotronic Man - A former jewel thief who became a metahuman with powers similar to Black Lightning after exposure to radiation. Following an earlier fight with Batman, the Cyclotronic Man works as an assassin for the 100 and was hired to kill Black Lightning and Superman.
  - Joey Toledo - A drug pusher who was responsible for the death of Earl Clifford. He was killed by a League of Assassins operative.
  - Syonide - A whip-wielding mercenary and expert toxicologist.
- Demolition - An armored supervillain.
- Ishmael - A shapeshifting servant of Tobias Whale who was sent to assassinate the Gangbuster while posing as him, but was defeated by Black Lightning and the Gangbuster.
- Lamar Henderson - A kid in Brick City and cousin of Gail Harris who was pressured into joining the Home Crew gang.
- Malcolm Merlyn - An evil archer and member of the League of Assassins.
- Miss Pequod - Tobias Whale's enigmatic secretary.
- Painkiller - A supervillain who was sent to kill Black Lightning.
- Queequeg - A shapeshifting servant of Tobias Whale and brother of Ishmael.
- Sick Nick - A doctor-themed villain.
- Warhog - An assassin who was sent to kill Black Lightning.
- White Thunder - An alien with flight and sound manipulation powers.

== Other versions ==
- In Justice League of America vol. 2 #26, the Vixen encounters an alternate version of Black Lightning called the "Brown Bomber", a contemporary version of the original Black Bomber envisioned before Jenny Blake Isabella's involvement with the character.
- An alternate universe variant of Black Lightning appears in Tangent Comics. This version is Francis Powell, a member of the Metal Men and the government organization Nightwing.
- An alternate universe variant of Black Lightning from Earth-23 appears in The New 52 as a member of a predominately African-American Justice League.

== In other media ==
=== Television ===
==== Animation ====
- Black Lightning was intended to appear in Super Friends, but disputes between DC and Black Lightning's creator Jenny Blake Isabella led to the creation of series-original character Black Vulcan.
- A character based on Black Lightning named Morris Grant / Soul Power appears in the Static Shock episode "Blast from the Past", voiced by Brock Peters. He is an elderly superhero who acquired his powers following an accident at the Hoover Dam and operated in Dakota during the 1960s alongside his sidekick Sparky. In the present, he lives in a retirement home in Dakota, but temporarily comes out of retirement to help Static defeat his old enemy, Professor Menace.
- Black Lightning appears in Batman: The Brave and the Bold, voiced by Bumper Robinson. This version is a teenager and leader of the Outsiders.
- Black Lightning appears in the "Thunder and Lightning" segment of DC Nation Shorts, voiced by Blair Underwood.
- Black Lightning appears in the Mad segment "That's What Super Friends Are For", voiced by Gary Anthony Williams.
- Black Lightning appears in Young Justice, voiced by Khary Payton. This version is Static's mentor and a member of the Justice League who later becomes the group's leader.

==== Live-action ====
Cress Williams as Black Lightning as he appears in his self-titled TV series

- Black Lightning appears in a Saturday Night Live sketch based on The Death of Superman storyline, portrayed by Sinbad.
- Black Lightning appears in a self-titled television series, portrayed by Cress Williams. This version operates in Freeland while working as the principal of Garfield High School as Jefferson Pierce. In the past, Jefferson witnessed his father Alvin getting killed by gangster Tobias Whale and his men, which led to Jefferson being taken in by Alvin's friend Peter Gambi. Additionally, Jefferson previously operated as Black Lightning years prior before promising his wife Lynn Stewart to retire. During the first season, Jefferson resurfaces as Black Lightning to fight Whale, the 100, and the A.S.A. while his daughters Anissa and Jennifer develop their own metahuman abilities. In the second season, Jefferson loses his position as principal due to being absent during the 100's attack on the school before he and his family are recruited by the A.S.A. to combat invading Markovians. In the third season, Jefferson has been placed in an A.S.A. prison called the Pit, where he is experimented on. After Jefferson escapes, Pariah recruits him, among other heroes, to avert the Crisis. While the Anti-Monitor consumes Jefferson's Earth, Oliver Queen sacrifices himself to reboot the multiverse, leading to Jefferson's Earth becoming part of Earth-Prime. In the fourth season, Jefferson retires from being Black Lightning once more, but ultimately goes on to have a final confrontation with Whale.
  - Williams also appears as Black Lightning in the fifth season of Legends of Tomorrow and the eighth season of The Flash.

=== Film ===
- Black Lightning appears in Superman/Batman: Public Enemies, voiced by LeVar Burton. This version works for President Lex Luthor.
- Black Lightning appears in Justice League: Crisis on Two Earths, voiced by an uncredited Cedric Yarbrough. This version is an associate of the Justice League. Additionally, a villainous alternate reality version of Black Lightning named Black Power appears as a minor member of the Crime Syndicate.
- Black Lightning appears in Teen Titans Go! To the Movies.
- Black Lightning makes a non-speaking appearance in Justice League: Crisis on Infinite Earths.

=== Video games ===
- Black Lightning appears in Batman: The Brave and the Bold – The Videogame, voiced again by Bumper Robinson.
- Black Lightning appears in DC Universe Online, voiced by Alexander Brandon.
- Black Lightning appears as a character summon in Scribblenauts Unmasked: A DC Comics Adventure.
- Black Lightning appears as a "premier skin" for Raiden in Injustice 2, voiced by Kane Jungbluth-Murry. Additionally, The CW incarnation of Black Lightning, referred to as "Multiverse Black Lightning", appears as a playable character in the mobile version.
- Black Lightning appears as a playable character in Lego DC Super-Villains via the "DC TV Super-Heroes" DLC pack.

=== Miscellaneous ===
- Black Lightning appears in The World's Greatest Superheroes newspaper comic strip.
- Black Lightning appears in the Justice League Unlimited spin-off comic book.
- Jefferson Pierce appears in Smallville Season 11 as a member of the Outsiders.
- Black Lightning appears in the Injustice: Gods Among Us prequel comic. He initially appears as a member of Batman's Insurgency before becoming disillusioned with their drastic measures and defecting to the Regime to rebuild Metropolis.
- Black Lightning appears in the Injustice 2 prequel comic, in which he rejoins the Insurgency following the Regime's downfall. Initially serving as Secretary of Housing, he becomes the President of the United States after Ra's al Ghul orders Aqualad to kill several government officials, leaving him the highest ranking person in the line of succession.

== Reception ==
IGN listed Black Lightning as the 85th greatest comic book hero of all time, describing him as a "true hero and a born badass who has earned his spot on the Justice League".
