= Peter Gambi =

Publication information
- Publisher: DC Comics
- First appearance: Black Lightning #1 (April 1977)
- Created by: Jenny Blake Isabella; Trevor von Eeden

In-story information
- Full name: Peter Gambi

Peter Gambi is a character appearing in comics published by DC Comics and is a supporting character of Black Lightning. He is the brother of Paul Gambi. Peter Gambi first appeared in Black Lightning #1 and was created by Jenny Blake Isabella and Trevor von Eeden.

Gambi appears in the live-action Arrowverse series Black Lightning, portrayed by James Remar.

== Fictional character biography ==
Peter Gambi is a former A.S.A. scout who turned his back on his life of crime, he became a tailor like his brother Paul Gambi. Peter established a tailor shop and befriended Pierce and his mother. When Tobias Whale orders the death of a student to threaten Pierce after the latter spoke out against the 100's criminal activities, Jefferson seeks Gambi's advice to avenge the victim. Gambi creates the costume that enables him to become Black Lightning.

Syonide captures Gambi and tries to force him to reveal Black Lightning's true identity.

Jefferson learns that Gambi was the one who killed his father. Gambi begs unsuccessfully for Black Lightning's forgiveness. Whale sends Syonide to kill Gambi and Black Lightning. Gambi sacrifices his life to save Black Lightning, and Pierce forgives him as he dies.

== In other media ==
- Peter Gambi appears in the "Thunder and Lightning" segment of DC Nation Shorts, voiced by Jeff Bennett.
- Peter Gambi appears in Black Lightning, portrayed by James Remar. This version, also known as Peter Esposito, used to work for the A.S.A. as their metahuman spotter before leaving the group to become a tailor and an ally of Black Lightning, who he raised after the latter's father was killed by Tobias Whale.
