= List of Legends of Tomorrow characters =

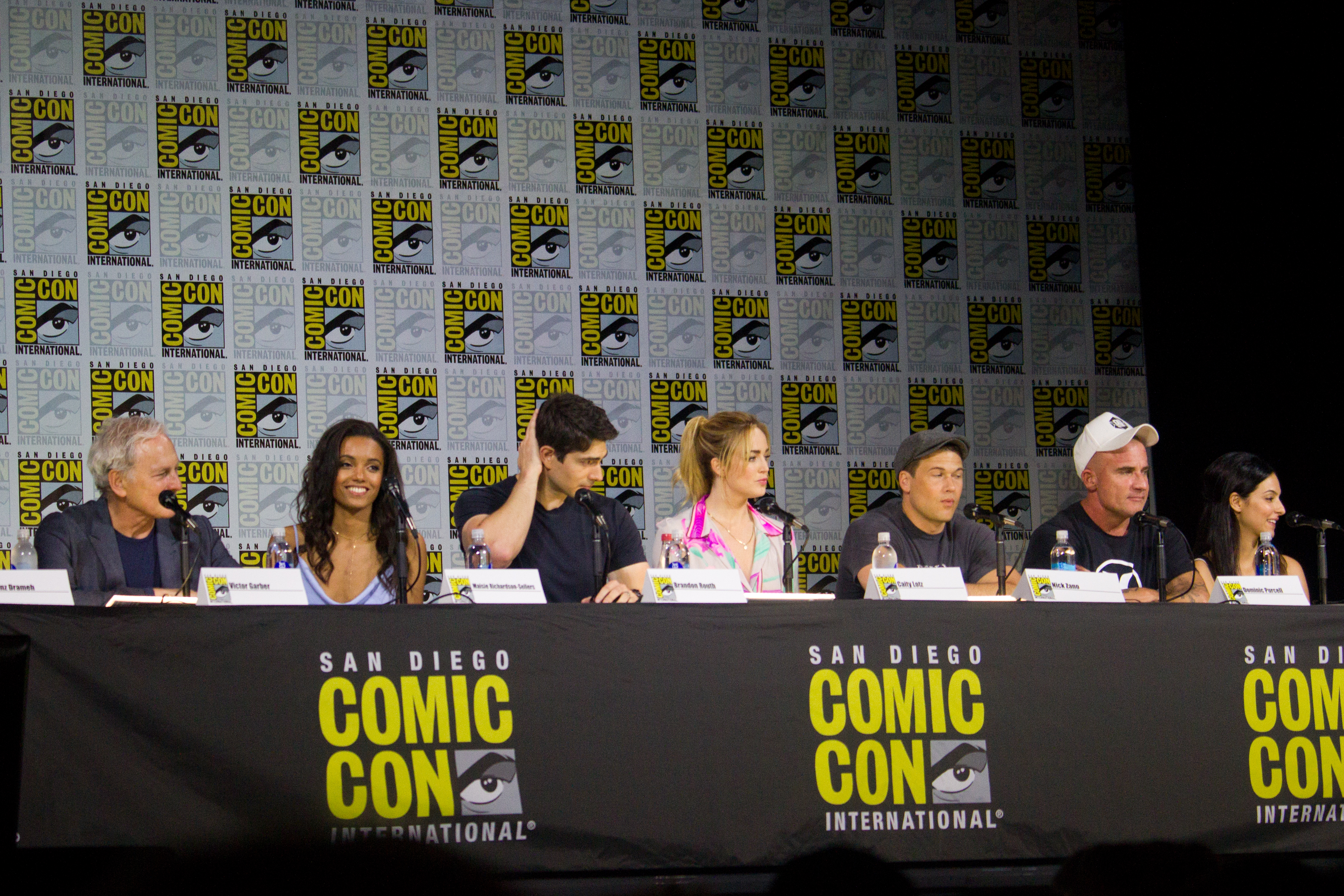
The season three cast at San Diego Comic-Con

Legends of Tomorrow is an American television series, developed by Greg Berlanti, Marc Guggenheim, Phil Klemmer, and Andrew Kreisberg, based on several characters from DC Comics. The series premiered in the United States on January 21, 2016, for The CW television network, and it finished its first season on May 19, 2016. The second season premiered in October 2016 and ended in April 2017. The third season premiered in October 2017 and concluded in April 2018, while the fourth season premiered in October 2018 and wrapped up in April 2019. The fifth season premiered in January 2020 and finished in June 2020.

Legends of Tomorrow's first season follows Time Master Rip Hunter (Arthur Darvill) in his mission to stop Vandal Savage (Casper Crump) from killing his wife and child and destroying the world. To help him, he forms a team of Legends consisting of Martin Stein (Victor Garber) and Jefferson Jackson (Franz Drameh) / Firestorm, Ray Palmer / The Atom (Brandon Routh), Sara Lance / White Canary (Caity Lotz), Kendra Saunders / Hawkgirl (Ciara Renée), Carter Hall / Hawkman (Falk Hentschel), Mick Rory / Heat Wave (Dominic Purcell), and Leonard Snart / Captain Cold (Wentworth Miller); with the A.I. Gideon (Amy Pemberton) providing assistance. By the end of the season, Snart sacrifices himself to save the Legends and Kendra and Carter depart following Savage's defeat.

The second season focuses on the remaining Legends fixing "aberrations" in time as well as confronting the Legion of Doom, composed of Eobard Thawne / Reverse-Flash (Matt Letscher), Damien Darhk (Neal McDonough), Malcolm Merlyn (John Barrowman) and a time-displaced Snart. Along the way, they are joined by historian Nate Heywood / Steel (Nick Zano) and Justice Society of America member Amaya Jiwe / Vixen (Maisie Richardson-Sellers). Though the Legends defeat the Legion, they accidentally destroy time and Rip disappears under mysterious circumstances.

The third season sees the Legends repairing anachronisms across the timestream. In addition, they also face opposition from Rip's Time Bureau and a demonic entity called Mallus (John Noble), whose disciple, Nora Darhk (Courtney Ford), has resurrected her father Damien and Amaya's future granddaughter Kuasa (Tracy Ifeachor). During the crossover storyline "Crisis on Earth-X", Stein is killed; as a result, Jefferson loses his powers and chooses to leave the Legends. The team gains new allies in computer hacker Zari Tomaz (Tala Ashe), speedster Wally West / Kid Flash (Keiynan Lonsdale), and Time Bureau agents Ava Sharpe (Jes Macallan) and Gary Green (Adam Tsekhman). In the end, Rip dies fighting Mallus while Amaya and Wally depart following the demon's defeat.

In the fourth season, the Legends must capture a group of mythical creatures that were released when they freed Mallus. Along the way, they must also stop the demon Neron from unleashing Hell on Earth. The team is joined by occult detective John Constantine (Matt Ryan), shapeshifting fugitive Charlie (Maisie Richardson-Sellers), Kaupe Mona Wu (Ramona Young), and a reformed Nora. After changing the timeline while defeating Neron, Zari is erased from the team and replaced by her brother, Behrad Tarazi (Shayan Sobhian).

In the fifth season, the Legends track down and stop evil historical figures called "Encores" after they are resurrected by Astra Logue (Olivia Swann), whom Constantine accidentally sent to Hell. Along the way, they discover Charlie is actually Clotho of the Fates, who is being hunted by her sisters, Lachesis (Sarah Strange) and Atropos (Joanna Vanderham), for destroying the Loom of Fate. Though Mona leaves the Legends to start her writing career and Ray and Nora also leave after getting married, Ava and Gary join the team after the Time Bureau gets shut down, the new Zari from the changed timeline joins them, and Astra ends up joining the team after the Fates betrayed her. The team regains their memories of the old Zari when they learn she has been transported to the World Between Worlds in the Air Totem however she cannot co-exist with her counterpart for too long as her timeline will bleed into the new one, risking Behrad's life. After defeating her sisters, Charlie departs to reunite with her old band.

In the sixth season, the Legends deal with rescuing Sara from the scientist human shapeshifter Bishop (Raffi Barsoumian) while dealing with alien creatures released by Sara in different times. The team is joined by alien hunter Esperanza Cruz (Lisseth Chavez). Zari Tomaz learns she can switch places with her counterpart in the Air Totem, allowing her to rejoin the team on a part-time basis and continue dating Nate. John and Mick depart following Bishop's defeat.

The following is a list of characters that have appeared on the television series. Many are based on or named for DC Comics characters.

== Overview ==
Legend
= Main cast (credited)
= Recurring cast (4+)
= Guest cast (1-3)

List of Legends of Tomorrow characters and cast
Character	Portrayed by	First appearance	Seasons						
Character	Portrayed by	First appearance	1	2	3	4	5	6	7
Main characters
Martin Stein / Firestorm	Victor Garber	"Pilot, Part 1"	Main (Note: Garber is credited through "Crisis on Earth-X, Part 4".)	Main	Main				Guest
Ray Palmer / Atom	Brandon Routh	"Pilot, Part 1"	Main (Note: Routh is credited through "Romeo v Juliet: Dawn of Justness".)	Main	Main	Main	Main		Guest
Rip Hunter	Arthur Darvill	"Pilot, Part 1"	Main	Main	Recurring				Guest
Sara Lance / White Canary	Caity Lotz	"Pilot, Part 1"	Main	Main	Main	Main	Main	Main	Main
Jefferson "Jax" Jackson / Firestorm	Franz Drameh	"Pilot, Part 1"	Main (Note: Drameh is credited in the main cast through "Beebo the God of War", and as a special guest star in "The Good, the Bad and the Cuddly".)	Main	Main				Guest
Kendra Saunders / Hawkgirl	Ciara Renée	"Pilot, Part 1"	Main						
Carter Hall / Hawkman	Falk Hentschel	"Pilot, Part 1"	Main (Note: Hentschel is credited in the main cast through "Pilot, Part 2" but his subsequent appearances are as a recurring guest star.)						Guest
Gideon	Amy Pemberton (Note: Starting in season three, Pemberton is credited as Amy Louise Pemberton.)	"Pilot, Part 1"	Main	Main	Main	Main	Main	Main	Main
Mick Rory / Heat Wave	Dominic Purcell	"Pilot, Part 1"	Main	Main	Main	Main	Main	Main	Stand-in
Leonard Snart / Captain Cold	Wentworth Miller	"Pilot, Part 1"	Main	Recurring	Guest (Note: Miller portrays his character's Earth-X counterpart Leo Snart in season three.)				Guest
Eobard Thawne / Reverse Flash	Matt Letscher	"Out of Time"		Main					Guest
Amaya Jiwe / Vixen	Maisie Richardson-Sellers	"Out of Time"		Main	Main				
Charlie / Clotho	Maisie Richardson-Sellers	"Dancing Queen"				Main (Note: Sellers is credited as a special guest star in her first appearance as Charlie then as a main cast member from "Wet Hot American Bummer" onward.)	Main		
Nate Heywood / Steel	Nick Zano	"Out of Time"		Main	Main	Main	Main	Main	Main
Zari Tomaz	Tala Ashe	"Zari"			Main (Note: After season four the character makes only limited appearances, but is still credited in the main cast.)	Main	Main	Main	Main
Zari Tarazi	Tala Ashe	"Miss Me, Kiss Me, Love Me"					Main	Main	Main
Wally West / Kid Flash	Keiynan Lonsdale	"Aruba-Con"			Main (Note: Lonsdale is first credited as a main actor in "The Curse of the Earth Totem" after previously making guest appearances in "Aruba-Con" and "Here I Go Again".)				
Ava Sharpe	Jes Macallan	"Aruba-Con"			Recurring	Main	Main	Main	Main
John Constantine	Matt Ryan	"Beebo the God of War"			Recurring	Main (Note: Ryan is listed among the main cast but credited in the opening titles as special appearance.)	Main	Main	
Gwyn Davies	Matt Ryan	"It's a Mad, Mad, Mad, Mad Scientist"							Main
Mona Wu	Ramona Young	"Dancing Queen"				Main	Recurring		
Nora Darhk	Courtney Ford	"Return of the Mack"			Recurring	Main (Note: Ford also plays as Marie Antoinette in season five.)	Main		Guest
Astra Logue	Olivia Swann	"Terms of Service"				Guest	Main	Main	Main
Mobius / Anti-Monitor	LaMonica Garrett	"Crisis on Infinite Earths: Part Five"				Guest (Note: Garrett portrays Mar Novu / The Monitor in season four.)	Main (Note: Garrett is only credited in "Crisis on Infinite Earths: Part Five.")		
Gary Green	Adam Tsekhman	"Aruba-Con"			Recurring	Recurring	Recurring	Main	Main
Behrad Tarazi	Shayan Sobhian	"Hey, World!"				Guest	Recurring	Main	Main
Esperanza "Spooner" Cruz	Lisseth Chavez	"Ground Control to Sara Lance"						Main	Main
Recurring characters
Vandal Savage	Casper Crump	"Pilot, Part 1"	Recurring			Guest			
Miranda Coburn	Alex Duncan	"Pilot, Part 1"	Recurring						
Damien Darhk	Neal McDonough	"Pilot, Part 2"	Guest	Recurring	Recurring		Guest		
Zaman Druce	Martin Donovan	"White Knights"	Recurring						
Lily Stein	Christina Brucato	"Outlaw Country"		Guest	Recurring				
Malcolm Merlyn / Dark Archer	John Barrowman	"The Chicago Way"		Recurring					
Henry "Hank" Heywood, Jr.	Patrick Lubczyk	"Moonshot"		Guest					
Henry "Hank" Heywood, Jr.	Tom Wilson	"The Virgin Gary"				Recurring			
Wilbur Bennett	Hiro Kanagawa	"Aruba-Con"			Recurring				
Kuasa / Vixen	Tracy Ifeachor	"Freakshow"			Recurring				
Amaya Jiwe's ancestor	Joy Richardson	"Zari"			Recurring				
Mallus	John Noble	"Return of the Mack"			Recurring				
Dorothy Heywood	Susan Hogan	"The Virgin Gary"				Recurring			
Tabitha	Jane Carr	"Witch Hunt"				Recurring			
Desmond	Christian Keyes	"Dancing Queen"				Recurring			
Konane	Darien Martin	"Tagumo Attacks!!!"				Recurring			
Mike the Spike	Paul Reubens	"Hell No, Dolly!"				Recurring			
Wolfie	Sisa Grey	"Lucha de Apuestas"				Recurring	Guest		
Ali	Lisa Marie DiGiacinto	"Slay Anything"					Recurring		
Lachesis	Sarah Strange	"A Head of Her Time"					Recurring		
Lita	Mina Sundwall	"Mr. Parker's Cul-De-Sac"					Recurring	Guest	
Atropos	Joanna Vanderham	"Zari, Not Zari"					Recurring		
Bishop	Raffi Barsoumian	"The Ex-Factor"						Recurring	Guest
Kayla	Aliyah O'Brien	"Bay of Squids"						Recurring	
J. Edgar Hoover	Giacomo Baessato	"The Bullet Blondes"							Recurring

== Legends of Tomorrow membership by season ==
Legends of Tomorrow team members
Member	Season 1	Season 2	Season 3	Season 4	Season 5	Season 6	Season 7
Martin Stein Firestorm	Yes	Yes	Yes	No	No	No	No
Ray Palmer Atom	Yes	Yes	Yes	Yes	Yes	No	No
Rip Hunter	Yes	Yes	Yes	No	No	No	No
Sara Lance White Canary	Yes	Yes	Yes	Yes	Yes	Yes	Yes
Jefferson Jackson Firestorm	Yes	Yes	Yes	No	No	No	No
Kendra Saunders Hawkgirl	Yes	No	No	No	No	No	No
Carter Hall Hawkman	Yes	No	No	No	No	No	No
Gideon	Yes	Yes	Yes	Yes	Yes	Yes	Yes
Mick Rory Heat Wave	Yes	Yes	Yes	Yes	Yes	Yes	No
Leonard Snart Captain Cold	Yes	No	Yes (Note: Earth-X Snart temporarily joined the team.)	No	No	No	No
Amaya Jiwe Vixen	No	Yes	Yes	No	No	No	No
Nate Heywood Steel	No	Yes	Yes	Yes	Yes	Yes	Yes
Zari Tomaz	No	No	Yes	Yes	Yes	Yes	Yes
Wally West Kid Flash	No	No	Yes	No	No	No	No
John Constantine	No	No	Yes	Yes	Yes	Yes	No
Charlie Clotho	No	No	No	Yes	Yes	No	No
Mona Wu Wolfie	No	No	No	Yes	Yes	No	No
Gary Green	No	No	Yes	Yes	Yes	Yes	Yes
Ava Sharpe	No	No	Yes	Yes	Yes	Yes	Yes
Nora Darhk	No	No	Yes	Yes	Yes	No	No
Behrad Tarazi	No	No	No	No	Yes	Yes	Yes
Zari Tarazi	No	No	No	No	Yes	Yes	Yes
Astra Logue	No	No	No	No	Yes	Yes	Yes
Esperanza "Spooner" Cruz	No	No	No	No	No	Yes	Yes
Gwyn Davies	No	No	No	No	No	No	Yes

== Main characters ==
=== Martin Stein / Firestorm ===
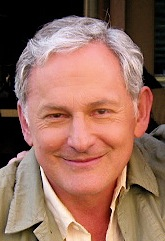
Victor Garber

Professor Martin Stein (portrayed by Victor Garber as an adult; main: seasons 1–3; guest: season 7) (portrayed by Graeme McComb as a young man; guest: seasons 1–3) is a faculty member from Hudson University and nuclear physicist focused on transmutation, who is also half of the character Firestorm with Jefferson Jackson. Stein is also Ray Palmer's former college professor. Initially time travels for intellectual pursuits and adventures with his wife Clarissa's blessing; however, after accidentally altering his own history resulted in his fatherhood in season two and becoming a grandfather following his daughter's pregnancy in season three, Stein discovers happiness that he and Clarissa had never experienced in the previous timeline and desires to be with his family, ultimately seeks to separate himself from the F.I.R.E.S.T.O.R.M. matrix, with help from Jax, Ray, Harry Wells, Cisco Ramon, and Caitlin Snow.

However, during the events of "Crisis on Earth-X", Stein is badly injured during the team's escape from Earth-X when he is shot by two Nazis and dies separating himself from the F.I.R.E.S.T.O.R.M. matrix. The Legends, Team Arrow, Team Flash, Supergirl, and Alex Danvers avenge Stein by defeating the Earth-X armies that are led by Overgirl and Dark Arrow and killing their leaders, though Eobard Thawne gets away.

Following Stein's death, his younger 1992 self is accidentally displaced in the Norsemen era with a Beebo toy, reveals details of Stein's change to his past during Hanukkah after his last encounter with his younger self in 1987 in the process. After taking his future self's advice, young Stein leads a fulfilling marriage with Clarissa following the couple's daughter Lily's birth, with him being a devoted father, therefore young Stein and his wife are living a much happier lives than what would have been without interfering Stein's destiny. The Legends end up saving him and getting him back to his own time with a replacement Beebo for his daughter. Becoming aware of his fate in 2017, young Stein decides not to learn the details of his impending death and avert it, knowing that he would die in the age of 67 hence a senior; he gathers that he would already lived his life to the fullest by then and even if he alters the event it would only bought himself a little time anyway due to being elderly. He resolves to treasure the life he has as a husband and father, and advises Jefferson to move on from his future self's death.

In season seven, Gideon encounters a memory of Stein at the time she suffers a virus.

The character was first introduced on The Flash. Garber left the series during season three to return to working in theatre; as a result, Stein was killed off in the "Crisis on Earth-X" crossover.

Victor Garber also portrays Henry Stein, an ancestor of Martin living in London, 1895.

=== Ray Palmer / Atom ===
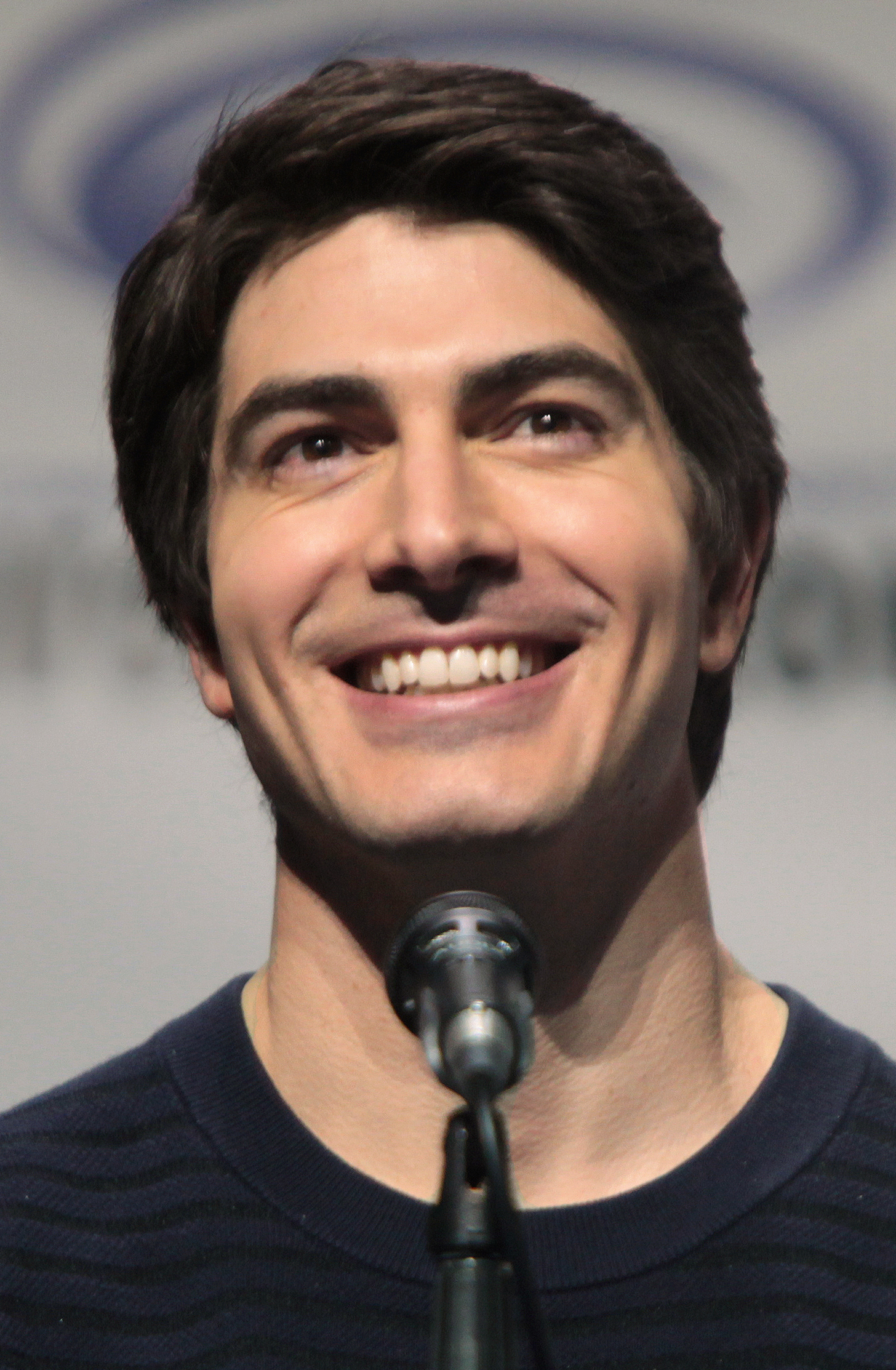
Brandon Routh

Dr. Raymond "Ray" Palmer (portrayed by Brandon Routh; main: seasons 1–5; guest: season 7) is a scientist, inventor, businessman, and CEO of Palmer Technologies. After losing his fiancée Anna to the Starling City Siege, Ray developed a power-suit to protect the people of Starling City and became a member of Team Arrow. After a lab accident that saw him captive for 6 months and the world believing him dead, he is now capable of shrinking and growing to immense sizes whilst wearing the suit.

During the first season, he develops a relationship with Kendra Saunders, but this ends when Hawkman is reincarnated as Scythian Torvil.

In later seasons, Ray forms a strong friendship with Nate Heywood and develops an attraction towards Nora Darhk. He later becomes the host of the demon Neron after surrendering his body to save Nate's life. He is eventually saved and resurrected by Constantine.

During season five, he marries Nora and leaves the Legends so they can live their lives together.

In season seven, Gideon encounters a memory of Ray while suffering from a virus.

The character was first introduced on Arrow. In August 2019, it was revealed that Routh would leaving as a series regular during the fifth season.

- Routh also portrayed the Superman of Earth-96, reprising the role from Superman Returns.

=== Rip Hunter ===
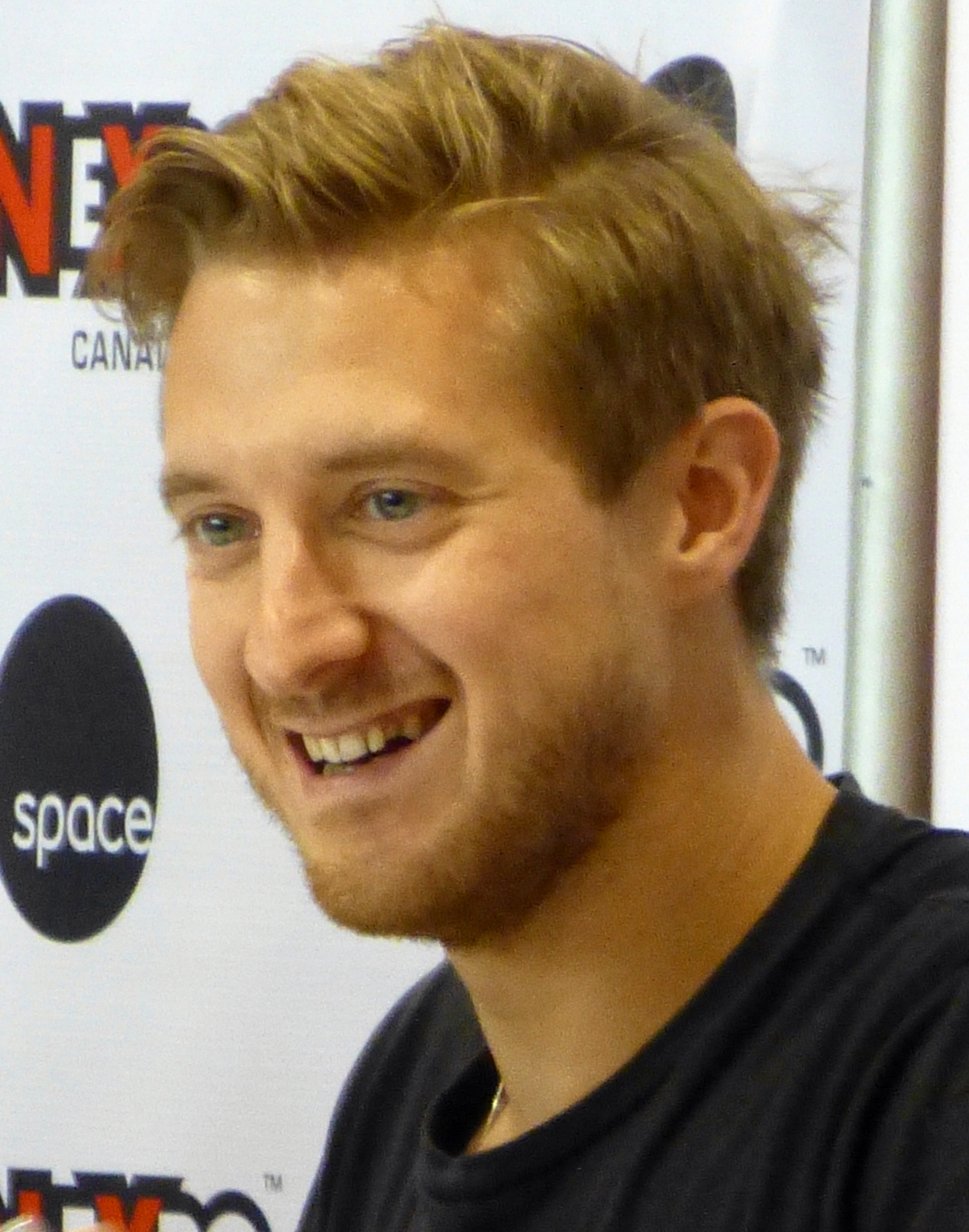
Arthur Darvill

Rip Hunter (portrayed by Arthur Darvill; main: seasons 1–2; recurring: season 3; guest: season 7) is a roguish time traveler and leader of the team as well as former Time Master, who hides the strains of being responsible for history itself behind a façade of charm and wit. His goal is to defeat Vandal Savage to save the world and his family. He and Savage are archenemies throughout the timeline. Aiden Longworth portrays a young Rip Hunter.

In season two, after giving himself false memories and identity for the sake of protecting the Spear of Destiny, Rip is captured and brainwashed into joining the Legion of Doom; he attempts to rewrite his and his family's fate with the Spear. He is also revealed to be an ally to a future variant of Barry Allen, whose younger self operates as the Flash in the present. By the end of the season, Rip regains his memories and leaves the Legends, feeling he has nothing left to teach them.

In season three, after leaving the Waverider for only 15 minutes in the Legends' time, Rip meets the team again in 2017. During the five years that have passed in Rip's time, he has set up the Time Bureau to replace the Time Masters and correct the anachronisms caused by the Legends. In the season finale, Rip sacrifices his life to stop Mallus. Darvill became a recurring actor for season three.

In season seven, Gideon encounters a memory of Rip while suffering from a virus. It was also revealed that Rip altered her programming so that she would interact with the Legends better.

=== Sara Lance / White Canary ===
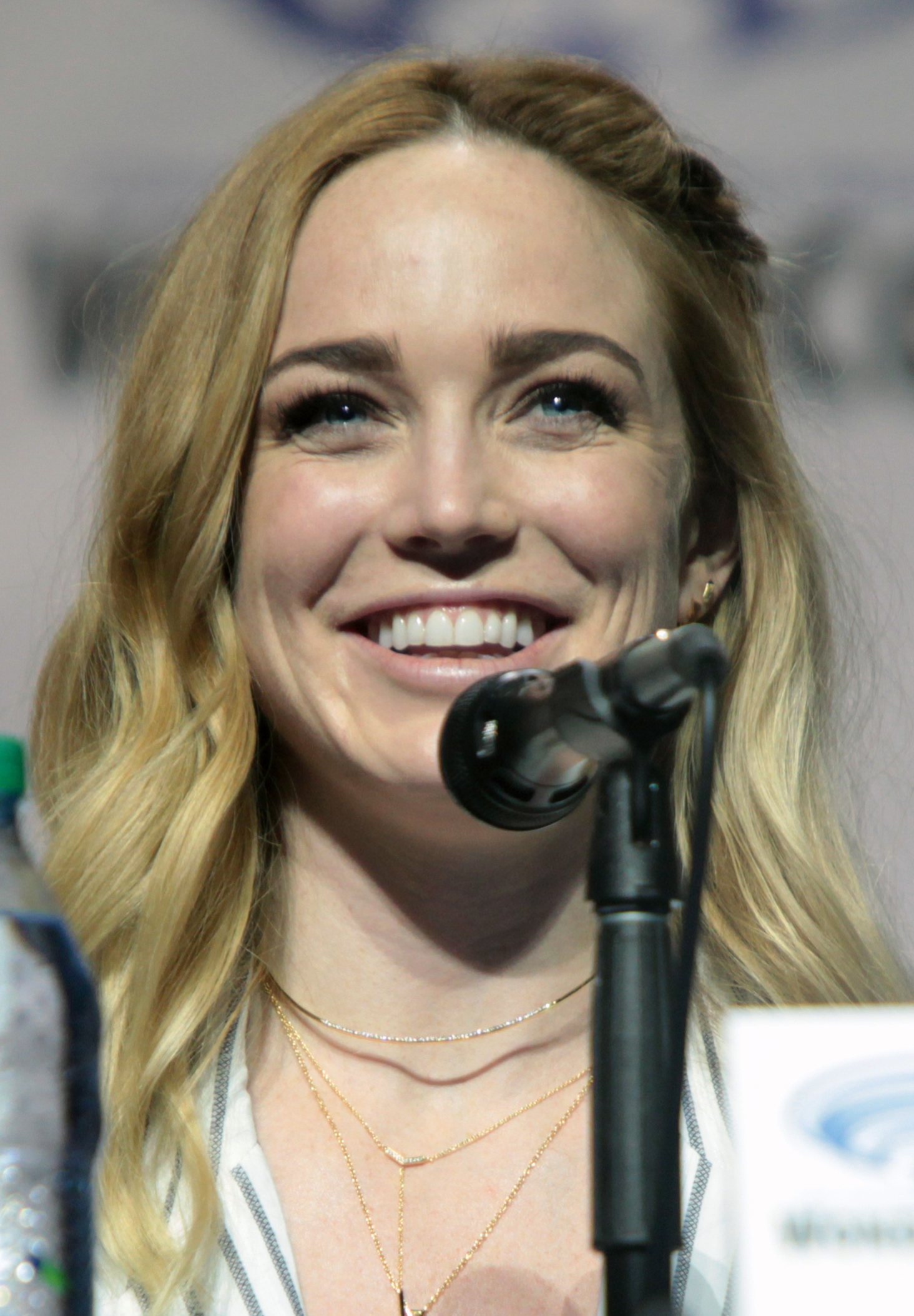
Caity Lotz

Sara Lance (portrayed by Caity Lotz as an adult; seasons 1–7; Emily Murden as a young girl) is a Star City vigilante and former League of Assassins member who initially suffered from rage issues after being resurrected by the mystical Lazarus Pit. After Rip Hunter's disappearance, she takes over as captain of the Waverider, and maintained the role even when he returned and left again to found the Time Bureau.

The character was first introduced on Arrow.

She is loosely based on the DC Comics characters Black Canary and White Canary.

==== Sara Lance robot clone ====
A factory reset version of Gideon created a robot clone of Sara Lance (also portrayed by Caity Lotz; recurring: season 7) to make up the new Legends of Tomorrow with Gideon claiming that the real Legends of Tomorrow are robot clones. While suspicious of the sudden revivals of her Zari and Astra, Sara figured out the truth and enlisted her Zari to look into this. Gideon revealed the truth after convincing Zari that she has built them to be better than the Legends as Dr. Sharpe reprograms Sara with Robot Nate becoming the new captain. During the mission in 1914, Robot Sara was tricked into removing her CPU.

=== Jefferson Jackson / Firestorm ===
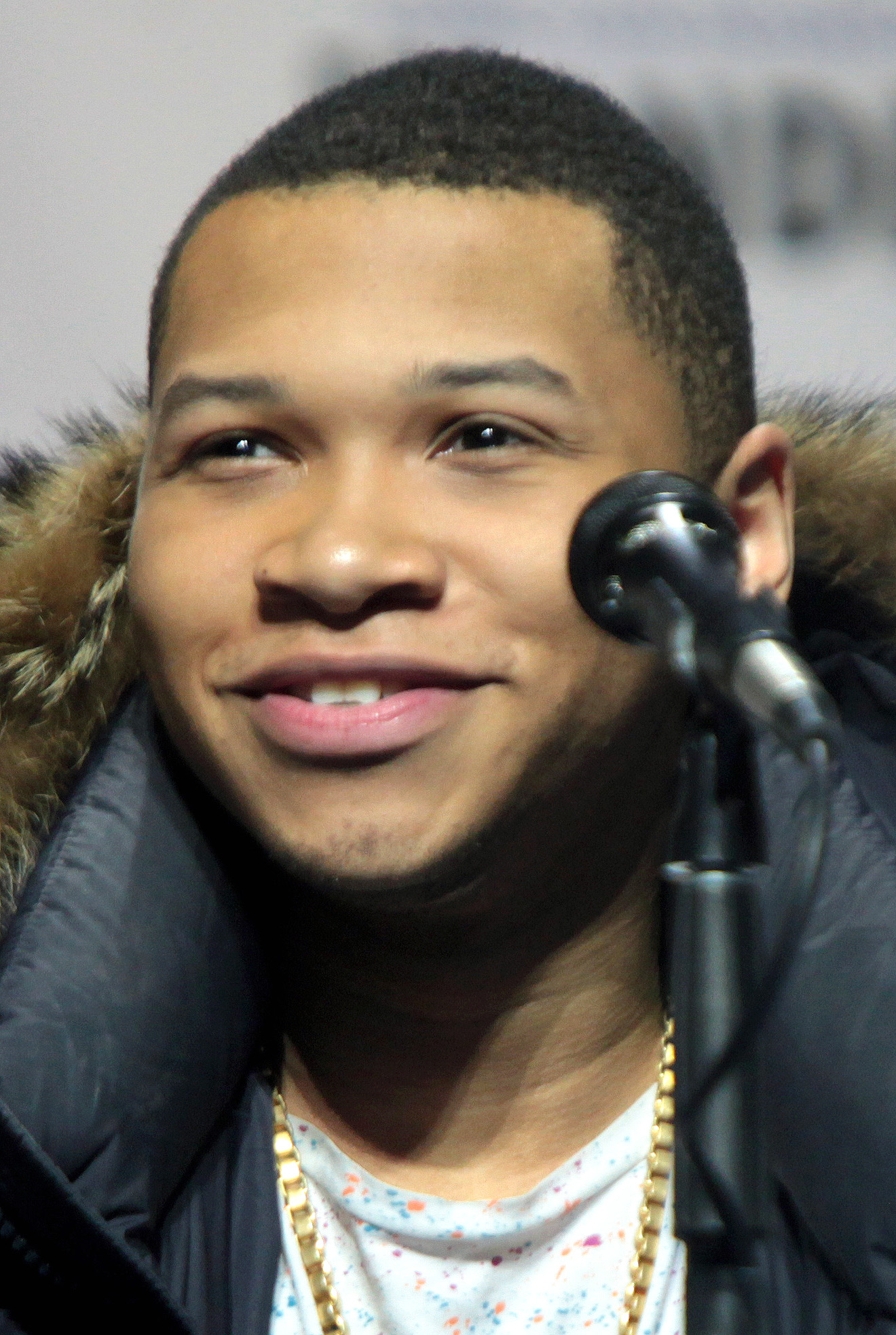
Franz Drameh

Jefferson "Jax" Jackson (portrayed by Franz Drameh; main: seasons 1–3; guest: season 7) was a high school athlete whose professional career was derailed by an injury who works as an auto mechanic. He serves as the other half of the character Firestorm with Martin Stein. The producers decided to create Jax as the other half of Firestorm to have him be someone in his early 20s and different from Ronnie Raymond, the previous Firestorm, bringing comedy and camaraderie with Stein.

In season three, it is revealed that with Martin's help, Jax has fulfilled his dream to enroll in college and finished it, and was admitted in a graduate program of engineering to earn his master's degree before he reunited with the Legends. The character was first introduced on The Flash. Drameh left the series as a main cast member in the middle of season three, but returned for the season finale, where it is revealed that it had been five years for Jax since he left and during that time he had married and had a daughter.

In season seven, Gideon encounters a British-accented memory of Jax while suffering from a virus. He helps her, Astra, and Spooner combat the virus.

=== Kendra Saunders / Hawkgirl ===
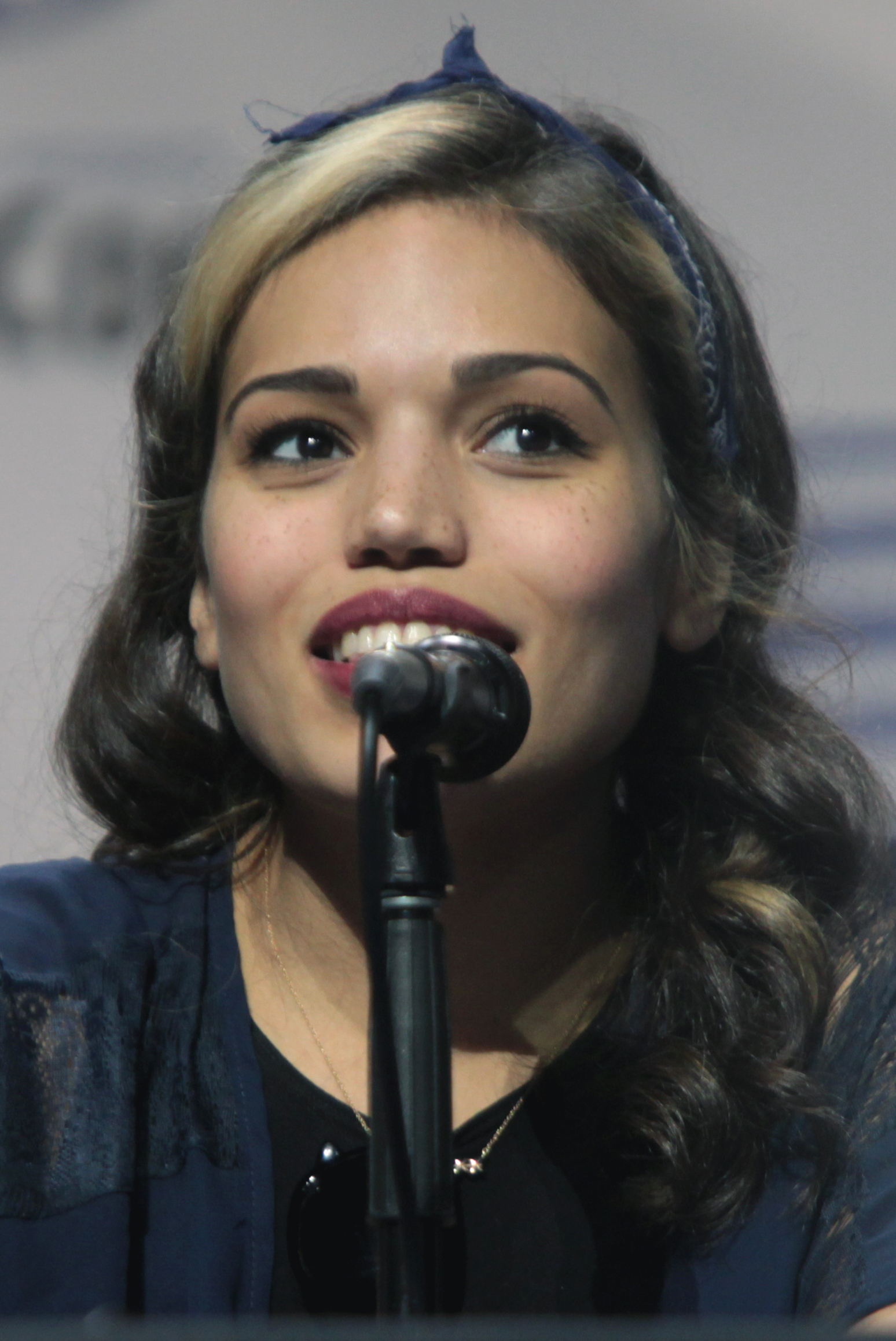
Ciara Renee

Kendra Saunders (portrayed by Ciara Renée; season 1) is a young woman who is just beginning to learn that she has been repeatedly reincarnated over the centuries as the Egyptian priestess Chay-Ara. When provoked, her ancient warrior persona manifests itself along with wings that grow out of her back. She chooses to leave the team at the end of season one.

The character was first introduced on The Flash. Anna Deavere Smith portrays an older version in 1871, known as Cinnamon.

=== Carter Hall / Hawkman and Scythian Torvil / Hawkman ===
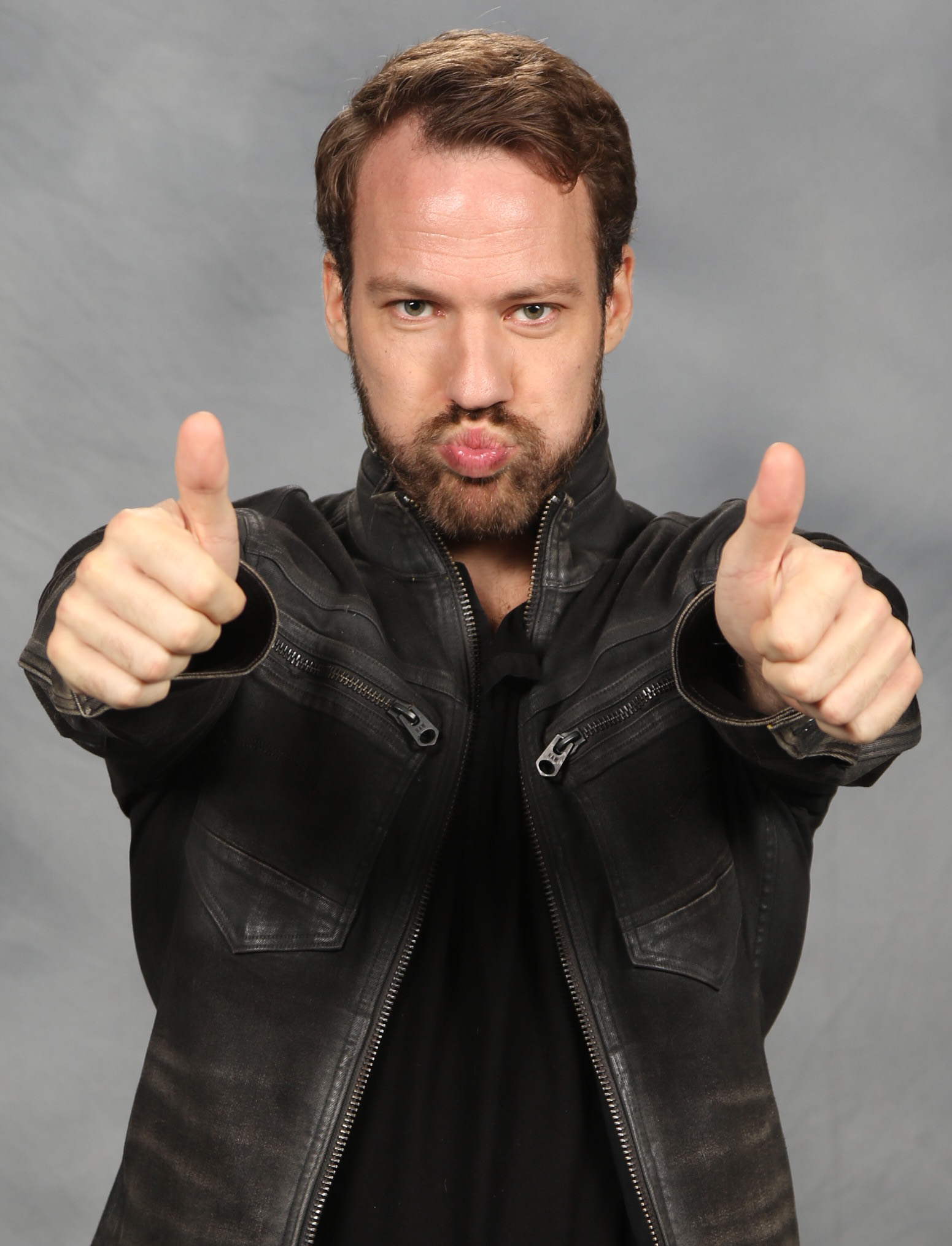
Falk Hentschel

Carter Hall (portrayed by Falk Hentschel; main: season 1; guest: season 7) is the latest reincarnation of the Egyptian prince Khufu who is fated to reincarnate throughout time along with his soulmate Kendra, with powers similar to hers. He chooses to leave the team at the end of season one. The character was first introduced on The Flash. Hentschel received guest credit in his subsequent appearances in season one after the character's death in "Pilot, Part 2." After being killed by Savage in 1975, Carter reincarnated into Scythian Torvil, a soldier under Savage's rule in 2166 unaware of his past lives. After remembering, Scythian turns on Savage and aids the team in defeating him before returning with the Legends to 2016.

In season seven, Gideon encounters a memory of Carter/Scythian while suffering from a virus.

He is based on the DC Comics character of the same name.

=== Gideon ===
Gideon (voiced and portrayed by Amy Louise Pemberton; seasons 1–7) is the artificial intelligence of the timeship Waverider. Pemberton portrays the physical representation of the character in the season two episode "Land of the Lost", the season three episode "Here I Go Again", the season four episode "Legends of To-Meow-Meow", and throughout the majority of the seventh season.

In the first and second season of the series, Legends of Tomorrow, Gideon does not play an active role, staying on the sidelines to provide exposition. Her character is the artificial intelligence operating the Waverider. Starting in the second season, Gideon takes a more active role. In the episode "Land of the Lost" Gideon appears inside of Rip Hunter's mind; here it is implied that there is a romantic relationship between them. In the season three episode "Here I Go Again" she puts Zari Tomaz in a time loop. This convinces Zari to stay with the Legends.

In the fifth season episode "Swan Thong", Gideon was temporarily removed from the Waverider and converted into the Loom of Fate. She is reverted to her standard form in the Waverider by Zari Tarazi, Zari Tomaz, and Behrad Tarazi.

In the sixth season, Gideon located Spooner Cruz while the Legends searched for Sara Lance. Ava Sharpe removes Gideon from the Waverider. She is then installed into a television in John Constantine's house.

In the seventh season, the Waverider is destroyed, seemingly killing Gideon. However, Gideon is accidentally revived as a human and modified to interact with the Legends. Gideon becomes a proper member of the Legends and assists them with missions. Amidst the events, she starts a romance with Gary Green. Later Gideon convinces AI Gideon to not kill the Legends and instead let them retire. In exchange, Gideon would become the new time captain, and Computer Gideon would serve as her AI. Ultimately in the final mission with the Legends, the team along with Gideon is arrested by the Time Police for breaking the timeline.

An alternate version of the character appears in The Flash (voiced by Morena Baccarin) as an artificial intelligence created by a future version of Barry Allen, later possessed by Eobard Thawne.

A second alternate iteration appears during the crossover event Crisis on Earth-X. The Earth-X equivalent is the artificial intelligence aboard the Nazi's Waverider (voiced by Susanna Thompson).

=== Mick Rory / Heat Wave ===
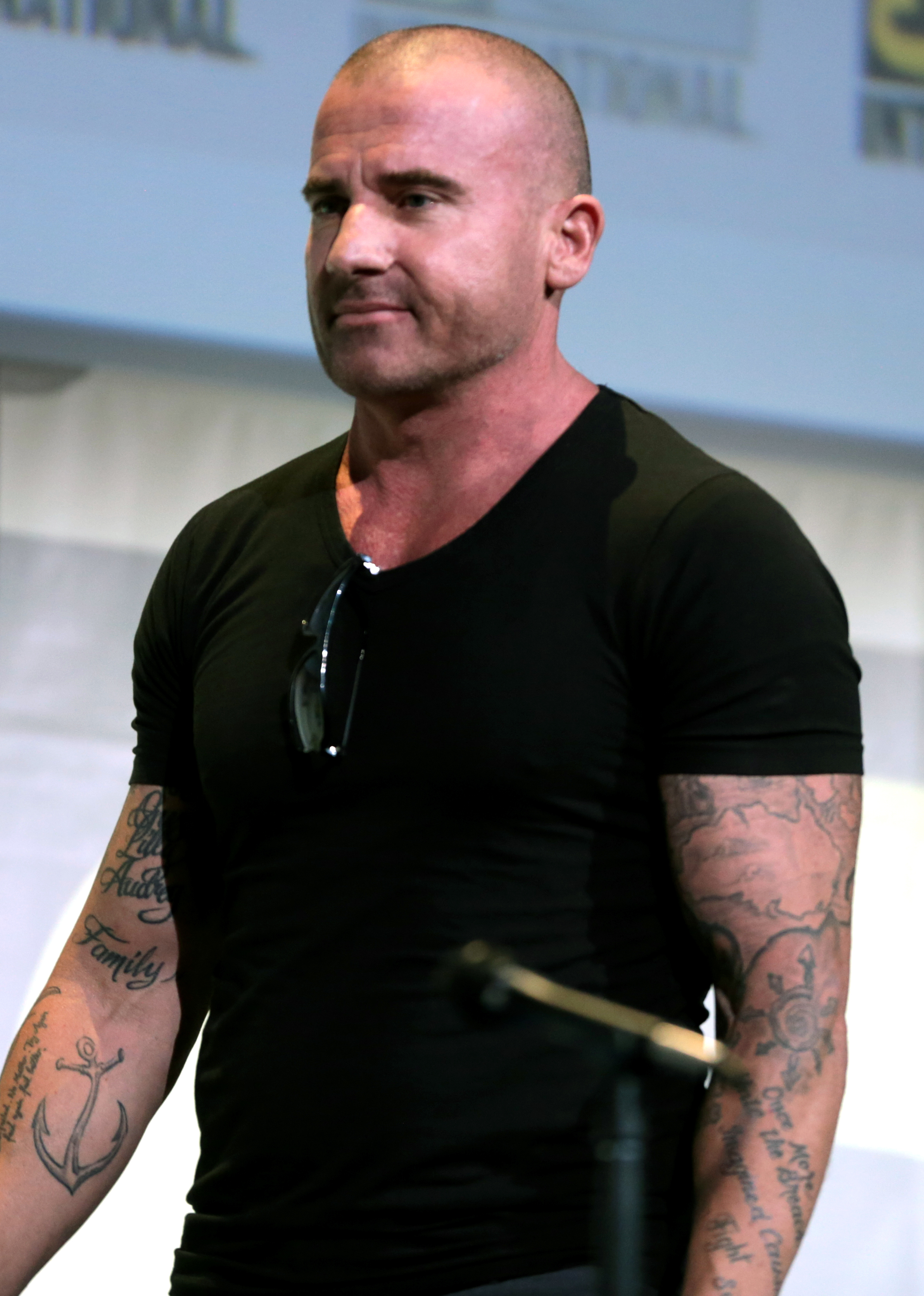
Dominic Purcell

Mick Rory (portrayed by Dominic Purcell; Mitchell Kummen as a teen; seasons 1–6) is an arsonist, career criminal, and accomplice of Leonard Snart who, in contrast to his partner, uses a heat gun capable of burning almost anything. After being deserted in the past by Snart, he is recruited by the Time Masters and becomes the bounty hunter Chronos, who hunts the team for a brief period of time, eventually returning to the Legends team. Later, he is shown to have a talent in writing, and becomes a semi-popular romance novelist under the pen name "Rebecca Silver".

In season five, Mick reconnected with a high school girlfriend in 2004 and inadvertently conceived a daughter with her. By 2020, he discovered said daughter, Lita's, existence after she libeled his books and began making an effort to raise her so she turns out better than he did.

In season six, Mick works with an alien Necrian named Kayla to rescue Sara from aliens. While in space, they have sex and Kayla impregnates him. Bishop delivers 48 alien hybrid eggs through Mick's nose, which hatch and devour Bishop. Afterwards, Mick plans to leave the Legends with Kayla and his children. Before doing so, he borrows the Waverider's emergency Time Courier for a beer run, accidentally stranding the rest of the Legends in Texas when the Waverider is destroyed.

The character was first introduced on The Flash.

He is based on the DC Comics character Heat Wave, while the Chronos persona is based on the character of the same name.

=== Leonard Snart / Captain Cold ===
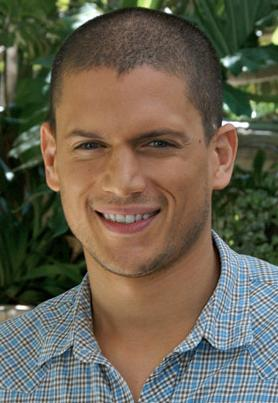
Wentworth Miller

Leonard Snart (portrayed by Wentworth Miller; main: season 1; recurring: season 2; guest: season 7) is the son of a corrupt police officer who turns to the quick and easy life of crime, and uses a cryonic gun to freeze objects and people on contact and his ability to plan strategically. He sacrifices himself to destroy the Occulus so the Time Masters will not manipulate the entire timeline. He later reappears as the member of the Legion of Doom, after his past self is recruited to the time-travelling Legion before he can join the Legends.

During the crossover event Crisis on Earth-X, Citizen Cold / Leonard "Leo" Snart (also portrayed by Wentworth Miller; recurring: season 3) the Earth X version of Captain Cold. This version is a hero who always supports the greater good. He is in a relationship with Ray Terrill. Following the deaths of Dark Arrow and Overgirl, Snart remains on Earth-1 where he helps the Legends cope with the loss of Martin Stein and to help thwart Damien Darhk's plot to have Leif Erikson's Vikings turn North America into New Valhalla. He later returns to Earth-X to fulfill his promise to Ray to be together.

In season seven, Gideon encounters a memory of Leonard while suffering from a virus.

The character was first introduced on The Flash.

=== Eobard Thawne / Reverse-Flash ===
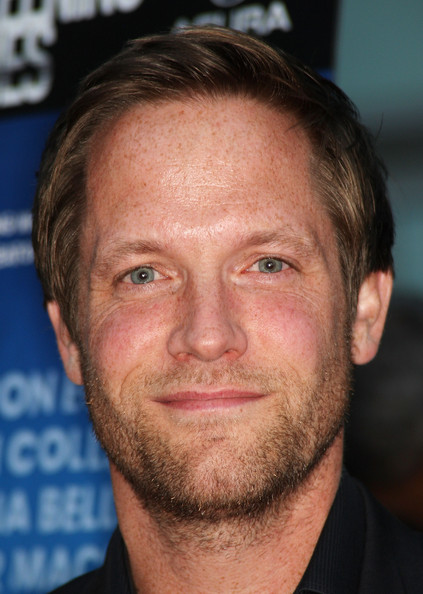
Matt Letscher

Professor Eobard Thawne (portrayed by Matt Letscher; main: season 2; guest: season 7) is a metahuman speedster from a future and the archenemy of Barry Allen / Flash. Once obsessed with the 21st-century superhero, Eobard replicated Barry's powers so he could become the Flash, only to learn through time travel that he was destined to become his greatest enemy. With this revelation, Eobard grew bitter with resentment and sought to prove his superiority as a speedster by killing the Flash, and became "Reverse-Flash". A temporal duplicate of the original villain inadvertently created by the Flash after he's brought into the "Flashpoint" timeline, this version travels through history and causes anomalies which the Legends must stop. Eobard is also being hunted by the Time Wraiths who send their undead black speedster to pursue him for his crimes against the Speed Force and status as a time remnant. Discovering that his ancestor Eddie Thawne killed himself upon learning Eobard's future existence and atrocious actions, he seeks to use the Spear of Destiny to cement his permanence in the timeline. He is a member of the Legion of Doom.

In season seven, Sara Lance encounters Thawne's temporal duplicate in the "Fixed Point" after having his speed removed by the Time Wraiths and re-educated to defend the "Fixed Point". Thawne agrees to help Sara out by delaying the assassination of Archduke Ferdinand for 40 minutes. He is later killed by the Robot Legends, though Nate tricks his robot clone into becoming the new guardian of the "Fixed Point" by having him wear the bracelet that Thawne gave to Sara.

The character was first introduced in The Flash.

=== Amaya Jiwe / Vixen ===
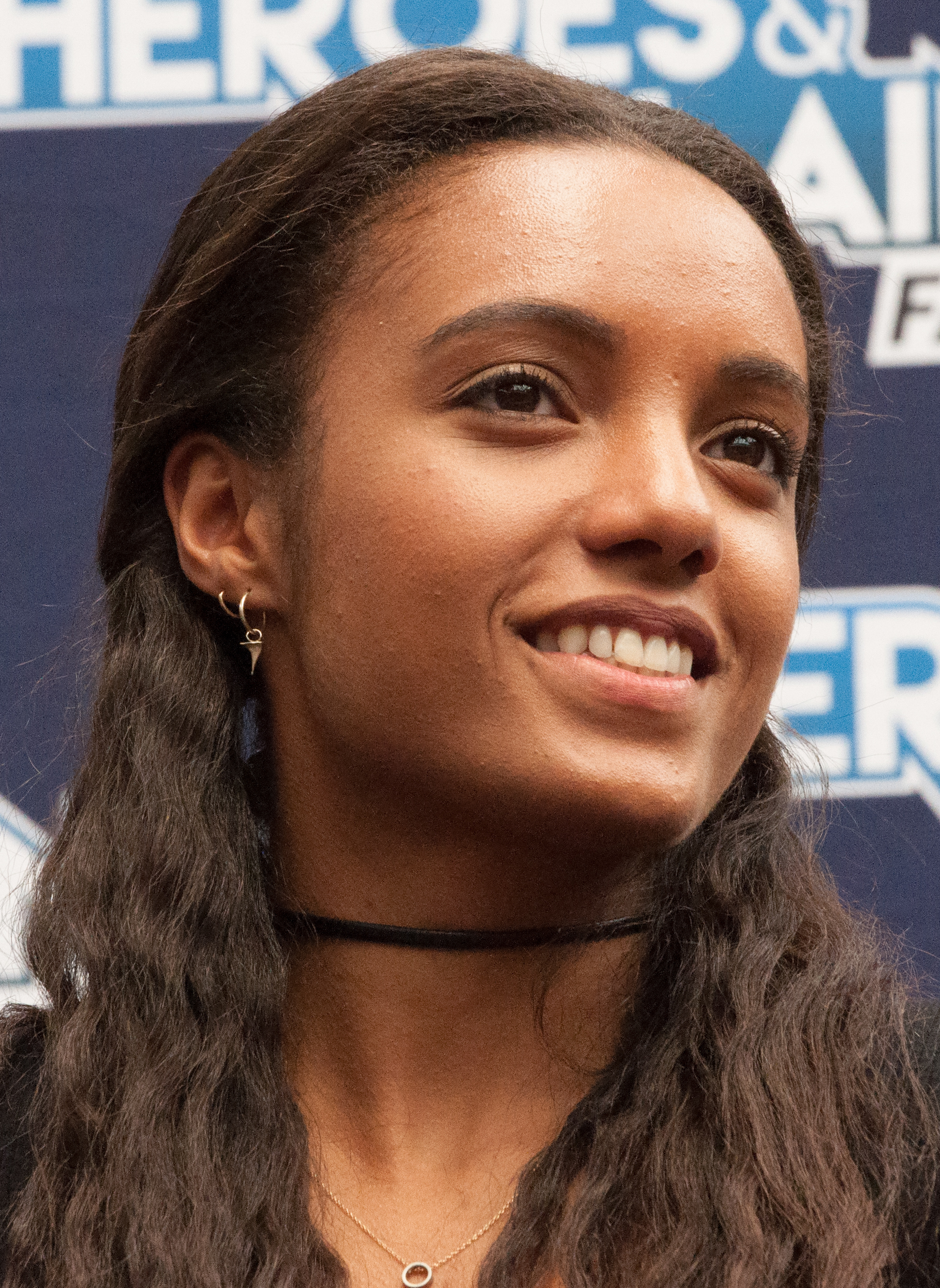
Maisie Richardson-Sellers

Amaya Jiwe (portrayed by Maisie Richardson-Sellers; seasons 2–3) is the grandmother of Mari McCabe and a member of the Justice Society of America, who is able to magically channel the abilities of the animal kingdom thanks to the Anansi Totem she wears around her neck. After the death of her former teammate and lover, Rex Tyler, she decides to join the Legends in their search for the killer. She eventually becomes romantically involved with Nate Heywood, but is ultimately obligated to return to her time to ensure that her family line still comes into existence; this conflict strains the relationship and leads to a temporary departure from the Legends after the Legion of Doom's defeat. Following some solo vigilantism, Amaya returns to the team to help them combat Mallus and his followers – which becomes personal when her granddaughter, Kuasa is resurrected as one of Mallus' disciples. After defeating Mallus, and some alterations to the timeline that prevent the destruction of her village in the future (and ensure both Mari and Kuasa becomes heroic holders of the Zambesi totem), Amaya returns to her time period to live out her life.

While Amaya Jiwe is an original creation for the series, her Vixen alias is a reference to the DC Comics character of the same name.

=== Nate Heywood / Steel ===
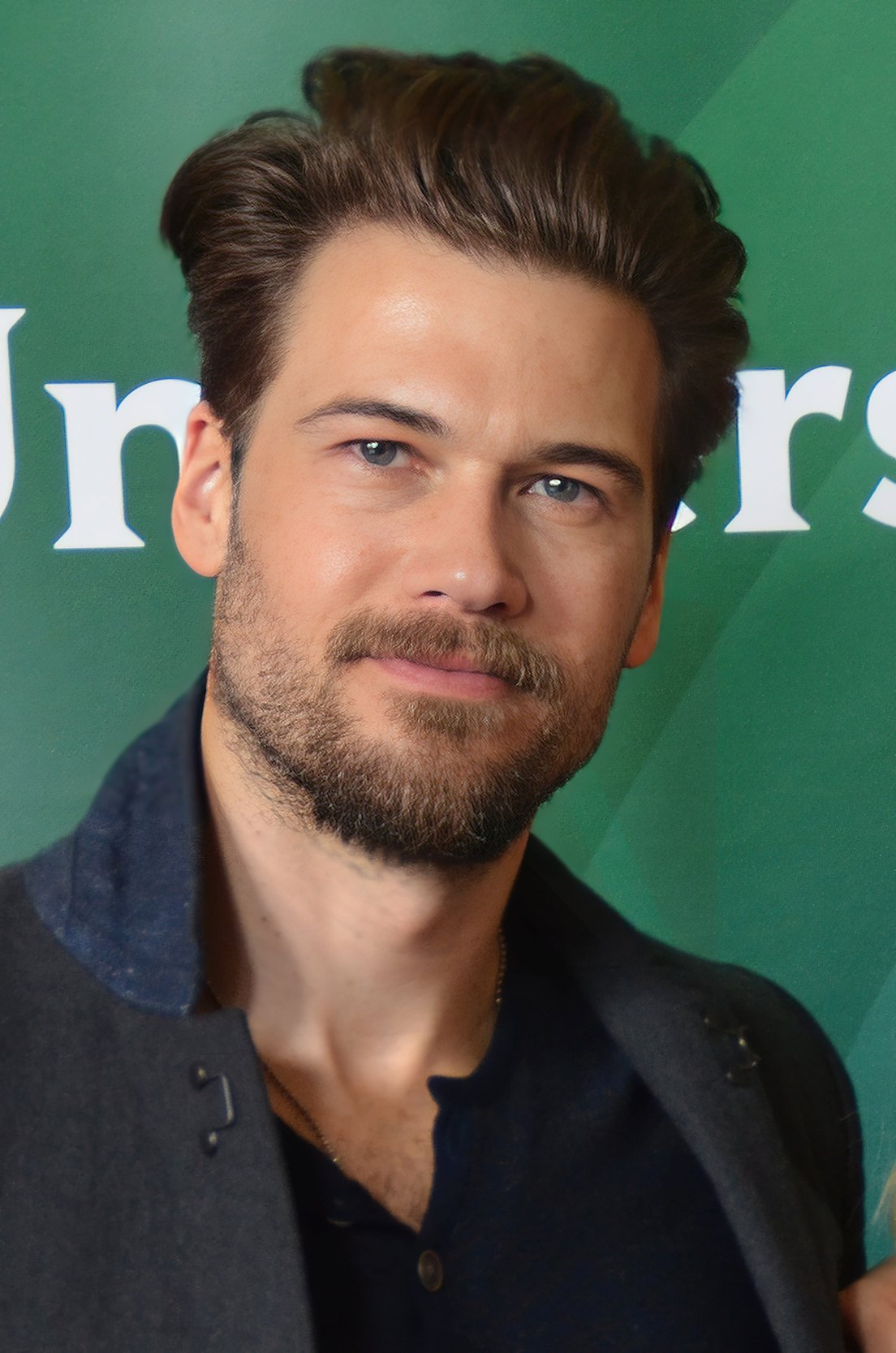
Nick Zano

Dr. Nathaniel "Nate" Heywood (portrayed by Nick Zano; seasons 2–7) is a historian whose grandfather was Henry Heywood, Sr. / Commander Steel, a member of the Justice Society of America. He is given an experimental serum to save his life, and develops the ability to transform his body into steel.

In season two, he begins dating Amaya, but they break up at the end of season three when Amaya returns to 1942 Zambesi. In season four, he joins the Time Bureau under Ava and his father Hank. He also begins dating Zari. After Neron kills Hank, Nate honors his father's dream by opening Heyworld, where he sacrifices himself to defeat Neron. In the afterlife, Nate meets his father again before the Legends revive him using Tabitha's magical staff, but this changes the timeline and replaces Zari with Behrad. In season five, Nate finds Zari (Zari Tarazi) again in the new 2042, but she does not remember him. However, the original Zari (Zari Tomaz) lives on in the Wind Totem, and by season six, the two Zaris are able to swap out from time to time, allowing Nate to resume his relationship with Tomaz.

In season seven, he makes plans to move into the Wind Totem. This happens after a trip to 1916 after mustard gas neutralized his powers as he was saving Alun Thomas, retiring from the team.

He is based on the DC Comics character of the same name.

==== Nate Heywood robot clone ====
A factory reset version of Gideon created a robot clone of Nate Heywood (also portrayed by Nick Zano; recurring: season 7) to make up the new Legends of Tomorrow with Gideon claiming that the real Legends of Tomorrow are robot clones. Unlike the real Nate, this version just has skin that is as hard as steel. He learns the truth from Gideon that they are to be an improvement of the real Legends of Tomorrow. After Robot Sara was reprogrammed, Robot Nate becomes the new leader of the Robot Legends of Tomorrow. During the mission in 1914, Robot Nate was briefly deactivated when his CPU was restored. Nate reactivated his robot clone and tricks him into becoming the new guardian of the "Fixed Point".

=== Zari Tomaz / Zari Tarazi ===
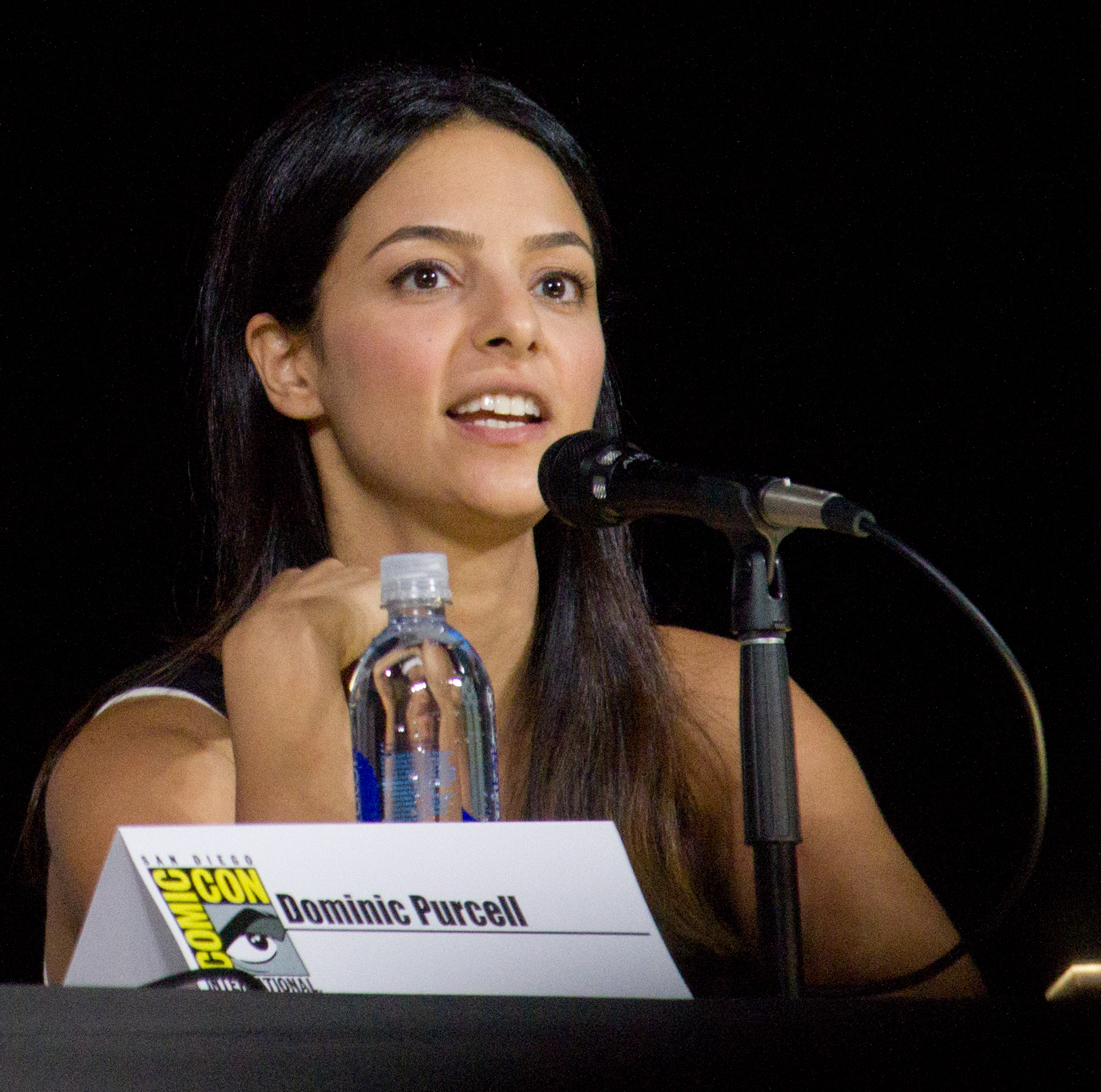
Tala Ashe

Zari Tomaz (portrayed by Tala Ashe; main: seasons 3–4; recurring: seasons 5–7) is a Muslim American computer hacker from the year 2042 who lives a double life with powers from a mystical source. Marc Guggenheim explained that part of the motivation for adding a Muslim superhero to the series was the "political climate" in the US after the 2016 elections. "Representation is a really powerful thing," said Ashe. "When I was growing up watching television, I didn't see anyone who looked like me. When I think of the kid version of myself, I think it broadens your perspective. What I think is so lovely about this show is that the Legends are this tapestry that represent America today." Gracelyn Awad Rinke portrays a young Zari from 2019.

Zari holds a magical amulet, which grants her elemental air powers. The amulet was originally owned by her younger brother Behrad, who was killed by A.R.G.U.S. in a dystopian 2042. Though initially hesitant to join the Legends, wanting only to avenge her brother, she eventually joins the team and enters a relationship with teammate Nate Heywood. In the season four finale, the Legends' actions results in the dystopian 2042 being erased from history and a living Behrad joining the team instead of Zari, with only Nate sensing that something has changed.

In season five, it is revealed that, while she lives on in the World Between Worlds in the air totem, she cannot co-exist with her other self for an extended period of time as the now-alive Behrad will die as a result of her timeline bleeding into the new one. In season six, she learns that she can switch places with her counterpart within the air totem allowing her to rejoin the Legends on a part-time basis. At the end of season seven, she retires from the Legends after they defeat Evil Gideon and save the life of Alun Thomas when Nate Heywood moves into the World Between Worlds in the air totem with her to maintain their relationship.

In season five, Zari Tarazi (portrayed by Tala Ashe; seasons 5–7) becomes a trendsetter until Nate starts to remember her, so he and Behrad reluctantly bring her onto the Waverider. While she is against Behrad using their family's totem, she comes to understand why he took it after he uses it to save her. Behrad later helps her reconcile with the spirits within their totem, including her other timeline self. After Atropos kills Behrad, Zari rejoins with the Legends to undo Behrad's death. When the Fates reclaim the Loom of Fate, Clotho splits Zari between her current self and her previous timeline self to gain control of the Legends, but to no avail. To save Behrad following Atropos and Lachesis' defeat, the previous timeline Zari returns to the totem.

She is loosely based on the DC Comics character Adrianna Tomaz.

==== Zari Tarazi robot clone ====
A factory reset version of Gideon created a robot clone of Zari Tarazi to make up the new Legends of Tomorrow with Gideon claiming that the real Legends of Tomorrow are robot clones. This version serves as an intelligence expert and hacker while sporting some tattoos. After her first body was shot, Dr. Sharpe transferred Robot Zari's backup data into another body while incinerating the destroyed body. When Robot Sara found out the truth about her group being robot clones of the Legends of Tomorrow, she enlisted Robot Zari to look into it. Robot Zari was later convinced by Gideon to not shut her down as Gideon tells the truth while revealing to the Robot Legends that they are an improvement over the real Legends of Tomorrow. Zari and her robot clone fight, which ends with Zari deactivating her robot clone.

=== Wally West / Kid Flash ===
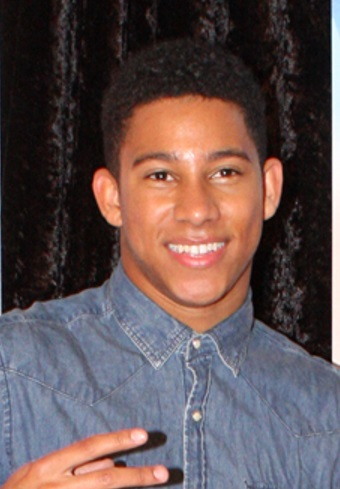
Keiynan Lonsdale

Wally West (portrayed by Keiynan Lonsdale; season 3) is a speedster from Keystone City who recently connected with his long-lost father Joe West, and sister Iris West. After acquiring metahuman abilities, Wally trained under his foster brother (later brother-in-law) and fellow speedster Barry Allen, eventually taking over the full-time responsibility of protecting Central City when Barry was trapped in the Speed Force. Wally and H.R. Wells learn that Wally was initially faster than Barry was at his stage. Upon Barry's return, Wally decides to leave Central City to forge his own path as a person and hero.

Lonsdale starred as the character on The Flash, and was promoted to a series regular in season three, starting in "The Curse of the Earth Totem" after previously making a guest appearance in "Aruba-Con" and "Here I Go Again".

=== Ava Sharpe ===
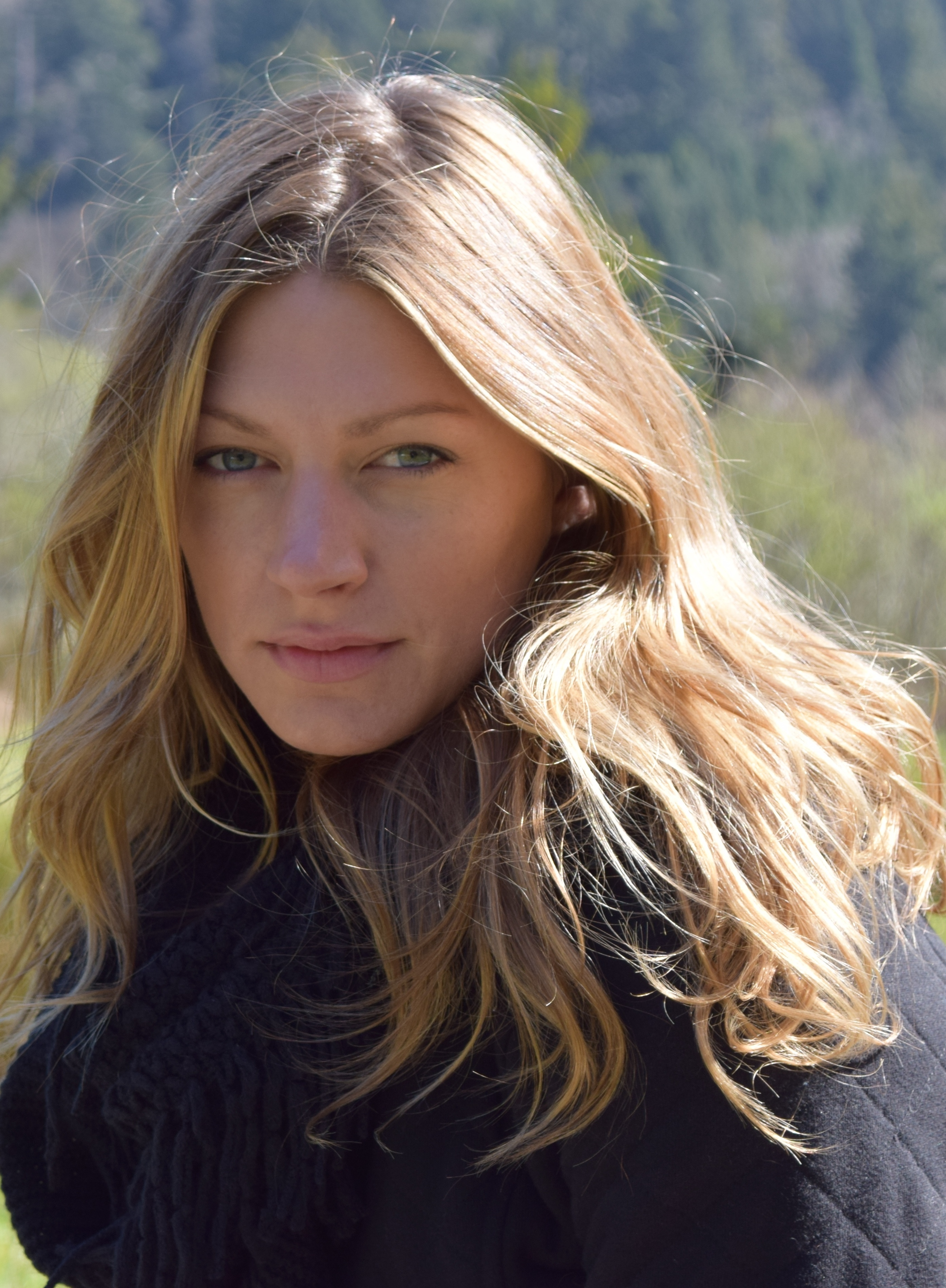
Jes Macallan

Ava Sharpe (portrayed by Jes Macallan; main: seasons 4–7; recurring: season 3; Vanessa Przada as a young Ava) is the 12th in a line of clones from the year 2213, tricked into believing she was born in the late 20th century who became a special agent for the Time Bureau and initially had a strong dislike of the Legends. She later fell in love with Sara Lance. Macallan was promoted to series regular for the fourth season.

Towards the end of the third season, Ava becomes the director of the Time Bureau, which she runs primarily throughout season four before its downfall in season five. Afterwards, she joins the Legends as co-captain alongside Sara, her girlfriend.

In season six, Ava works to find Sara after she is abducted by aliens. Upon her return, they get engaged and eventually get married.

In season seven, after another Waverider destroys the Legends' Waverider, Ava and Sara operate as the Bullet Blondes while working to get the Legends to Dr. Gwyn Davies. During the mission to save Alun, she learns that her wife is pregnant with her baby. When she returned to the Waverider after defeating Evil Gideon and saving the life of Alun Thomas, she was arrested by the Time Police alongside her team for breaking the timeline.

==== Ava Sharpe clones ====
In season six, Bishop oversees a series of Ava Sharpe clones (also portrayed by Jes Macallan) that serve him and assist him with his goals. One clone works as a nurse while the others work as Bishop's soldiers. With help from Mick and Gary, the Ava clones turn against Bishop.

In season seven, the Bishop from 2214 perfects the Ava clone and begins his plot to strand the Legends in the 1920s and replace the untimely dead with robot clones. The Ava clone is later ejected into the timesteam by Gideon after she served her purpose. Gideon had a new robot clone of Ava made to serve the Robot Legends of Tomorrow where she tended to their bodies, uploaded backup data into them if their original bodies are destroyed, and reprogram any of them. When she and Robot Astra enter the pocket dimension upon having a drink that was spiked with food poisoning during a mission in 1915, Gary shoves them out the door into Hell.

=== Charlie / Clotho ===
Charlie (portrayed by Maisie Richardson-Sellers in Amaya Jiwe's form; seasons 4–5) is a magical shapeshifting fugitive who escaped imprisonment along with Mallus and many others. Charlie is a non-human entity who is found while she is posing as the lead singer (portrayed by Anjli Mohindra) of a punk rock band in 1977 London. When cornered by the Legends, Charlie shifts into multiple members of the team before John Constantine disables her abilities, leaving her trapped in Amaya Jiwe's form. She is taken prisoner aboard the Waverider. After forming a bond with Mick Rory, Charlie sides with the Legends in their mission on the condition she not be imprisoned further. Charlie slowly starts regaining her shapeshifting powers and by the end of the season appears to have almost completely regained them, though she remains in her Amaya Jiwe form when not using her powers. Charlie tells Zari that being trapped in one mortal form is causing her to age for the first time in centuries, meaning that her virtual immortality is at risk. When Charlie takes part in a raid to save magical creatures from the Time Bureau, she is captured by Neron and Tabitha, who use her shapeshifting powers to scare the public into fearing the creatures. She is eventually saved by Mick and Sara.

In season five, Charlie reveals she is actually Clotho of the Moirai and that she hid the Loom of Fate from her sisters to give everyone free will. Originally, she scattered the pieces across the Multiverse. After the Crisis and the formation of Earth-Prime, the pieces were returned to said Earth and she is now being hunted by her sisters. Following the mission involving Genghis Khan, Charlie comes clean about her identity. After losing her friends to her sisters, Charlie rejoins them and uses the Loom of Fate to subjugate the world. Following this, Clotho revives the Legends and traps them in TV shows to keep them safe, only for them to escape. Lachesis imprisons Clotho for this and makes her believe that she is responsible for humanity's failings. After Mick's daughter, Lita, helps her see that was not the case, Clotho helps the Legends defeat her sister, whom she reconciles with before leaving the Legends and returning to her old band as Charlie.

In season six, Charlie appears through archive footage.

=== Nora Darhk ===
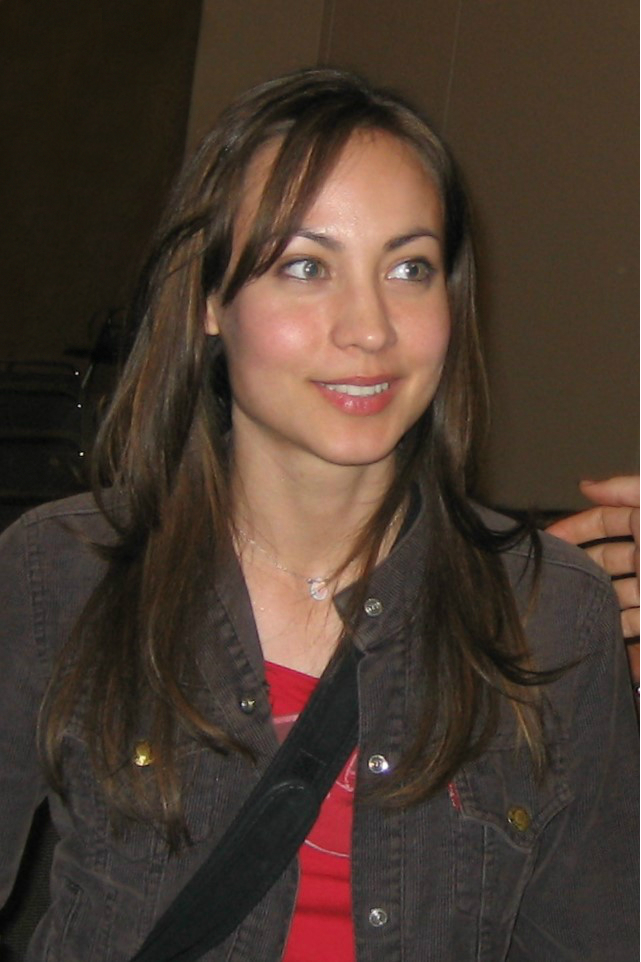
Courtney Ford

Eleanor "Nora" Darhk (portrayed by Courtney Ford; main: seasons 4–5; recurring: season 3; guest: season 7; Madeleine Arthur as young Nora) is the daughter of Damien Darhk who revives her father upon becoming a follower of Mallus. She gains magical powers by channeling Mallus. During the third season she also temporarily gains the powers of Zari and Amaya's totems. Following the death of her father and the defeat of Mallus, Nora voluntarily surrenders to the Time Bureau.

In season four, Nora begins assisting the Legends and the Time Bureau and eventually develops a romantic relationship with Ray Palmer. Nora gains the powers of a fairy godmother when Tabitha tricks her into taking over her powers as well as the burden of having to obey human charges.

In season five, Nora and Ray get married and leave the Legends after helping them obtain the first piece of the Loom of Fate.

In season seven, Gideon encounters a memory of Nora while suffering from a virus.

- Ford also portrayed Marie Antoinette, the Queen of France who ruled from 1774 to 1792 before she was beheaded during the French Revolution. Astra gives her soul a second chance following this, reviving her. In addition, she gives Marie a neckpiece to keep her head attached and magical perfume to make anyone who smelled it attracted to her. She charmed several French revolutionaries and Napoleon before the Legends stop her by separating her head and body, though Astra recalls her to Hell. Lachesis encores her again to combat the Legends in the Museum of Bad Ideas, only to have her head knocked off.
- Tuesday Hofmann previously portrayed the character on the fourth season of Arrow.

=== John Constantine ===
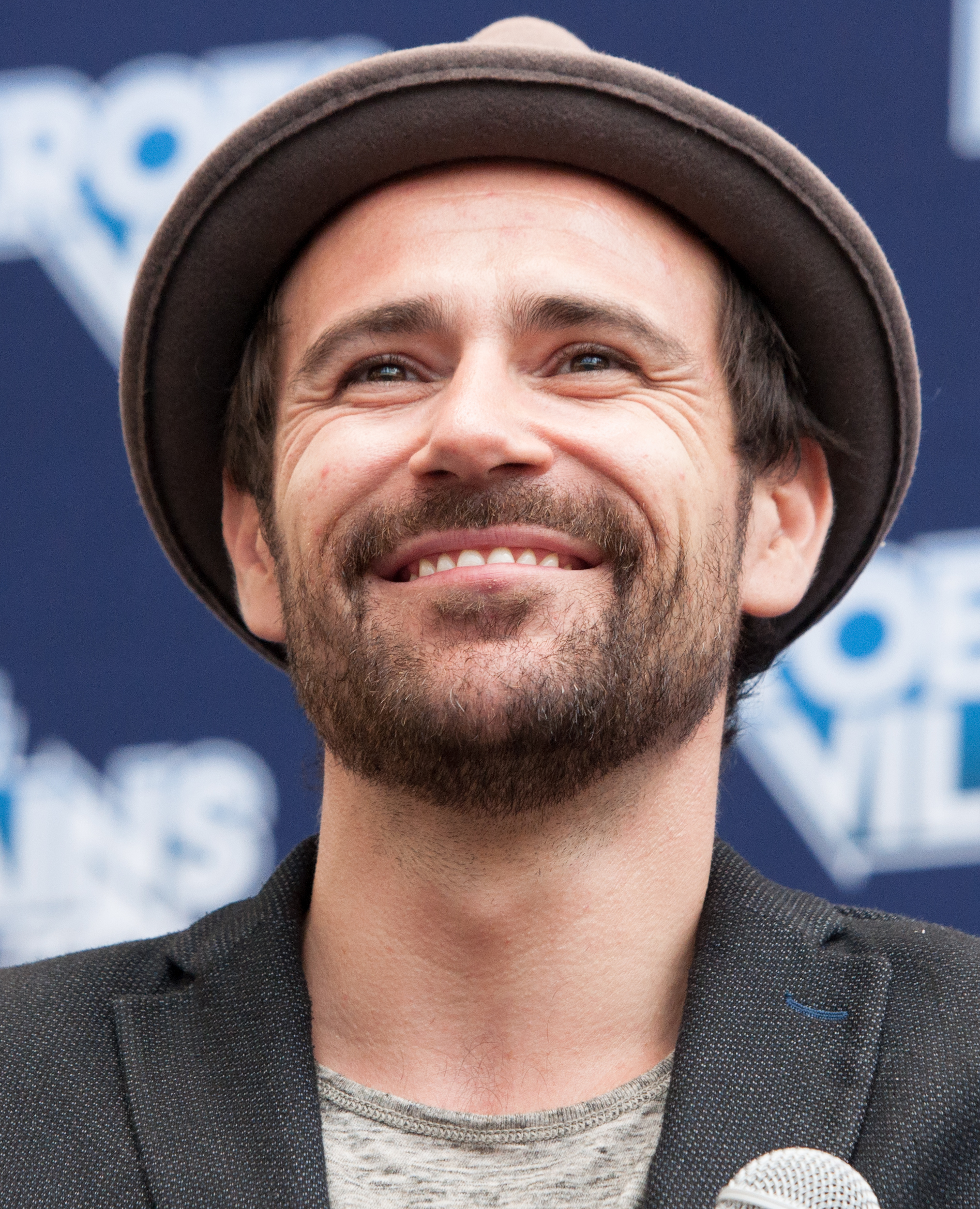
Matt Ryan

John Constantine (portrayed by Matt Ryan; main: seasons 4–6; recurring: season 3) is a chain-smoking, enigmatic and irreverent a demon hunter and dabbling master of the occult, part time associate of Oliver Queen and later member of the Legends, beginning from their fight against Mallus. Ryan reprises the role from Constantine and Arrow. Ryan was announced as being promoted to the main cast for the fourth season. Following the fight against Mallus, Constantine joins the Legends to hunt down the magical creatures they unwittingly released throughout history, eventually discovering an old nemesis, the demon Neron, as the mastermind of a plot to take over the world. Constantine finally defeats Neron by tricking the demon into breaking his word, forcing him out of Ray's body, and then killing him.

In season five, Constantine works against an adult Astra Logue, the victim of a botched exorcism. He searches for the Loom of Fate, hoping to rewrite reality to give Astra and her mother, Natalie, happier lives. Constantine also begins a relationship with Zari Tarazi.

In season six, Constantine sacrifices his magic to stop Aleister Crowley. He searches for the Fountain of Imperium in hopes of regaining them, but to no avail. He comes across magical potions that temporarily grant him bizarre power, and becomes addicted to them despite the deadly effects on his health. Although Zari convinces Constantine to turn his life around, he is taken over by his "dark side" and works with Bishop to link with the Fountain. However, Bishop anticipates a betrayal from Constantine and poisons him, destroying the Fountain. He dies at Astra's and Zari's side, apologizing for his misdeeds. He is able to return from Hell, but remains damned. He parts ways with Zari and the Legends.

In season seven, Constantine's key is used by the Legends to open a portal to a pocket dimension in Hell that contains a duplicate of his mansion.

- Ryan also portrays King Kon-sten-tyn, Constantine's 1st century BCE ancestor and the progenitor of his magical bloodline.

=== Mona Wu / Wolfie ===
Mona Wu (portrayed by Ramona Young in human form and by Sisa Grey in Kaupe form; main: season 4; recurring: season 5) is initially a delivery girl, but is later hired by the Time Bureau due to her knowledge of magical creatures. During a struggle between two Time Bureau operatives and Konane, a Kaupe that she develops a burgeoning relationship with, Mona is accidentally slashed in the stomach. As a result, she gains the ability to turn into a Kaupe herself, with her new alter ego dubbed "Wolfie". After being fired from the Time Bureau, she is made an official member of the Legends team.

In season five, she leaves the Legends after Mick appoints her as his successor as "Rebecca Silver". After the Fates use the Loom of Fate to take control of the world, Mona returns to help Gary free the Legends from their control.

=== Behrad Tarazi ===
Behrad Tarazi (portrayed by Shayan Sobhian; main: seasons 6–7; recurring: season 5; guest: season 4) is Zari's younger brother who originally operated as a vigilante with a magical amulet before he was killed by A.R.G.U.S. in 2042. When the Legends accidentally change the timeline at the end of season four, Behrad is never killed by A.R.G.U.S. and Zari never gains possession of his amulet, resulting in Behrad becoming part of the team instead of her.

In season five, Behrad assists the Legends in their fight against the Encores and helping Zari rejoin them. During her hunt for the Loom of Fate, Atropos kills Behrad, inspiring Zari to stay with Constantine and the Legends until they rebuild the Loom so she can save him. When the Fates regain control of the Loom, Behrad was revived in a Friends-type sitcom called Ultimate Buds. When the Legends regain their memories and get their shows cancelled, Behrad is temporarily reunited with Zari from the previous timeline until she returns to the wind totem after realizing her presence is killing him.

In season six, Zari Tomaz splits the Wind Totem into two so that he and Zari Tarazi could both use it. In season seven, he enters a relationship with Astra. When he returned to the Waverider after defeating evil Gideon and saving Alun Thomas, he was arrested by the Time Police alongside his team for breaking the timeline.

He is loosely based on the DC Comics character Amon Tomaz.

==== Behrad Tarazi robot clone ====
A factory reset version of Gideon created a robot clone of Behrad Tarazi (also portrayed by Shayan Sobhian; recurring: season 7) to make up the new Legends of Tomorrow with Gideon claiming that the real Legends of Tomorrow are robot clones. He has a militant personality and is in competitions with Robot Spooner. During the mission in 1914, Robot Behrad is taken down by Astra.

=== Astra Logue ===
Astra Logue (portrayed by Olivia Swann; main: seasons 5–7; guest: season 4) was accidentally sentenced to hell as a young girl by Constantine during a botched exorcism. After being taken in by Lachesis, she was turned evil as she grew up. While she helps Constantine and Nora recover Ray's soul during season four, she secretly steals evil souls to give them a second chance at life and use them against the Legends during season five. When Astra tampers with Constantine's soul coin, he offers to use the Loom of Fate to change her mother's fate, so she relents. Astra later discovers that Lachesis and Atropos took her soul coins, so she convinces them to let her join them while secretly joining the Legends to get Constantine's coin back. However, Lachesis uncovers her treachery and kills her before she can help the Legends. When the Fates regain control of the Loom, Astra is revived and placed in a TV show before regaining her memories. Following Atropos and Lachesis' defeat, Astra moves in with Constantine and gives him his soul coin. Swann was upped to series regular for the fifth season.

In season six, Astra learns magic under occultist Aleister Crowley, who eventually betrays her. In order stop him, she uses a spell by her mother Natalie that removes all magical abilities, including Crowley's and Constantine's. She starts over with Constantine, and also develops a close friendship with Esperanza "Spooner" Cruz.

In season seven, Astra inadvertently turns Gideon into a human while trying to rebuild the Waverider and enters a relationship with Behrad. After the factory reset version of Gideon in a robot clone body sets the Waverider to self-destruct in the timestream, Astra uses her magic to protect herself, Spooner, and human Gideon while successfully using her magic to pull the Waverider back together. When she returned to the Waverider, she was arrested by the Time Police alongside her team for breaking the timeline.

- Astra was previously voiced by Bailey Tippen (who portrayed her in Constantine) in season three, while Melody Niemann portrayed her as a child in season four.

==== Astra Logue robot clone ====
A factory reset version of Gideon created a robot clone of Astra Logue (also portrayed by Olivia Swann; recurring: season 7) to make up the new Legends of Tomorrow with Gideon claiming that the real Legends of Tomorrow are robot clones. This version serves as an intelligence expert with Robot Zari. When her original body was shot, Dr. Sharpe transfers the Robot Astra's backup data into another body while incinerating the destroyed body. After she and Dr. Sharpe enter the pocket dimension upon having a drink that was spiked with food poisoning during a mission in 1914, Gary shoves them out the door into Hell. A badly-burned Robot Astra re-entered the mansion and stabbed Gideon's human form before shutting down.

=== Mobius / Anti-Monitor ===
The Anti-Monitor (portrayed by LaMonica Garrett; season 5) is the polar opposite of the Monitor, an evil being dedicated to ending the multiverse.

=== Gary Green ===
Gary Green (portrayed by Adam Tsekhman; main: seasons 6–7; recurring: seasons 3–5) is a Time Bureau agent and Ava Sharpe's subordinate. He is awkward, tentative and often the butt of jokes made by both the Legends and other workers at the Time Bureau. Eventually the impatience, carelessness and unkindness he faces leads to Gary being seduced by Neron into joining him in season four. Gary eventually makes amends with the Legends and agrees to help them take down Neron before joining the team in season five. Tsekhman was promoted to the main cast in October 2020, ahead of the sixth season.

In season six, it is revealed that Gary is an alien called a Necrian and that his Image Inducer glasses help cloak his true form. He was formerly engaged to his boss, Kayla.

In season seven, he enters a relationship with the newly-human Gideon. When he returned to the Waverider after defeating Evil Gideon and saving the life of Alun Thomas, he was arrested by the Time Police alongside his team for breaking the timeline.

==== Gary Green robot clone ====
A factory reset version of Gideon created a robot clone of Gary Green (performed by Chris Olson; recurring: season 7) to make up the new Legends of Tomorrow with Gideon claiming that the real Legends of Tomorrow are robot clones. Although he is mostly in his Necrian form where the other robot clones of the Legends can understand him and subtitles can translate his language, he can still eat his targets. During a mission in 1914, Robot Gary is tricked by the real Spooner into attacking her robot counterpart by passing off a Robot Spooner. He swallowed the real Robot Spooner who set off a grenade where both of them are destroyed.

=== Esperanza "Spooner" Cruz ===
Esperanza "Spooner" Cruz (portrayed by Lisseth Chavez as an adult; seasons 6–7; Dominique Lucky Martell as a young girl) is a "tough and self-sufficient" woman who "lives off the grid, devising ingenious tech for the detection of – and defense against – space aliens, and while some might call her paranoid, she calls it being prepared. A survivor of a childhood alien encounter, Spooner now believes she has the ability to communicate telepathically with aliens". Esperanza was the survivor of an alien encounter and claims that a radio that they put in her head allows her to understand alien language. The Legends kidnapped her so she could help them find Sara in Space, but she eventually joins them full-time. She develops a close friendship with Astra Logue. During an incident with a Zaguron, Esperanza discovered that she can speak to aliens. It is later revealed that Esperanza used to live with her mother Gloria in 1925 Odessa, Texas, and that the Fountain of Imperium teleported her to the future to rescue her from her mother's murderers. The present Spooner learns this and reveals her identity to her mother and rescues her from her death.

In season seven, Esperanza works with Astra to help the Legends find a way back to the present. In the episode "The Fixed Point" (2022), Esperanza comes out as asexual to Zari 2.0; she is the first Arrowverse character to do so. When she returned to the Waverider after defeating Evil Gideon and saving the life of Alun Thomas, she was arrested by the Time Police alongside her team for breaking the timeline.

==== Esperanza "Spooner" Cruz robot clone ====
A factory reset version of Gideon created a robot clone of Esperanza "Spooner" Cruz (also portrayed by Lisseth Chavez; recurring: season 7) to make up the new Legends of Tomorrow with Gideon claiming that the real Legends of Tomorrow are robot clones. She has a militant personality and is often competing with Robot Behrad. During a mission in 1914, Spooner posed a Robot Spooner to trick Robot Gary into killing his teammates. He swallowed the real Robot Spooner who set off a grenade, destroying them both.

=== Gwyn Davies ===
Gwyn Davies (portrayed by Matt Ryan; season 7) is a scientist and war veteran living in 1925 New York City who is responsible for the foundation of time travel after his boyfriend Alun Thomas was killed during World War I in Mametz Wood. The Legends seek him out to figure out how to return to the present after being stranded in 1925. When he returned to the Waverider after defeating Evil Gideon and saving the life of his love interest, Alun Thomas, he was arrested by the Time Police alongside his team for breaking the timeline.

== Recurring characters ==
This is a list of recurring actors and the characters they portrayed in multiple episodes, which were significant roles. The characters are listed by the order in which they first appeared.

=== Introduced in season one ===
==== Oliver Queen / Green Arrow ====
Oliver Queen / Green Arrow (portrayed by Stephen Amell; seasons 1–3 & 5) is a former billionaire playboy and Star City politician who secretly operates as the vigilante "Green Arrow". Amell also appears as the potential 2046 version of the character.

- Amell also portrays his character's Earth-X counterpart, Dark Arrow.

==== Vandal Savage ====
Hath-Set / Vandal Savage (portrayed by Casper Crump) is an ancient Egyptian immortal who has manipulated leaders throughout history in an attempt to gain dominion over the entire world. Savage hunts the various incarnations of Hawkman and Hawkgirl to prolong his life. He is later targeted by time traveler Rip Hunter after killing Rip's family in 2166. He is killed for good by Mick Rory in 1958, by Sara Lance in 1975, and by Kendra Saunders and Rip Hunter in 2021.

In season four, Vandal Savage appears in hell. He was originally sent by the Triumvirate to torture Ray Palmer, but they started talking and became friends instead. Savage is portrayed as cheery, mentioning he loves the "groovy" Legends.

The character was first introduced in two-part crossover of The Flash and Arrow, "Heroes Join Forces" as the major villain and is the main antagonist of season one. He is based on the DC Comics characters Hath-Set and Vandal Savage.

==== Damien Darhk ====
Damien Darhk (portrayed by Neal McDonough; seasons 1-3 & 5) is a former member of the League of Assassins whom the Legends first encounter (from their point of view) at a weapons auction in 1975 during season one. McDonough appears as the character in 2016 on Arrow, during its fourth season, as the leader of the clandestine group, H.I.V.E. In season two, Darhk forms an alliance with Eobard Thawne / Reverse-Flash as a Legion of Doom member when he learns that Sara will kill him in 1987 as retribution for the murder of her sister in 2016. He is determined to find the Spear of Destiny and use its powers to avert the events that would lead to his death by the Green Arrow.

Though the events of his death remain unchanged, Darhk is eventually resurrected by his time-traveling daughter Nora and her master Mallus after his corpse has time displaced in Victorian London and he vows revenge against the Legends and their allies for his death. His resurrection and displacements also create a loophole that would allow Sara Lance to fulfill her vendetta against him without changing the timeline's course. However, horrified upon his daughter's actions Damien begins to feel remorse over his actions and eventually betrays Mallus. During the final battle, Damien sacrifices himself so that Mallus can possess him instead of his daughter.

In season five, Astra revives Damien to give him a second chance at life. He was supposed to cause misery, but he chose to see Nora instead. After learning she had become a fairy godmother and wanted to marry Ray, he was initially disappointed in her until Nora's charge wished the Darhks into her favorite TV show, Mr. Parker's Cul-De-Sac, to make them work out their issues. Following this, the Darhks reconcile and Damien allows Nora to marry Ray. After reconciling with Sara over him killing Laurel, he renounced his evil ways and borrowed Genghis Khan's hell sword to kill himself with it so Astra could not use him again.

==== Zaman Druce ====
Zaman Druce (portrayed by Martin Donovan) is a Time Master who is Rip Hunter's mentor. He reveals himself as an ally to Vandal Savage. Zaman dies after Snart destroys the Oculus that would manipulate time itself.

=== Introduced in season two ===
==== Malcolm Merlyn ====
Malcolm Merlyn (portrayed by John Barrowman) is a wealthy businessman and the former Ra's al Ghul. He is a member of the Legion of Doom. The character was first introduced in Arrow. Barrowman appears due to his deal that allows him to appear on all shows in the Arrowverse. After the subsequent losses of his wife and son and his company, his daughter's alignment with the Green Arrow, and numerous defeats, Malcolm seeks to use the Spear of Destiny to rewrite details of his life to his own benefits.

==== Lily Stein ====
Lily Stein (portrayed by Christina Brucato as an adult, Winter Lily White as a young woman) is Martin Stein's daughter who is conceived as a result of Stein encouraging his younger self from 1987 to show his wife Clarissa just how much he appreciates and loves her. Young Stein took his counterpart's advice and decided to focus on his family include impregnating Clarissa on her birthday, significantly changing his family history. Prior to the timeline change, Stein and his wife chose not to have a child due to Martin's fear of being a neglectful father; he had been focused on his work, and tended to neglect his wife. He is shocked to discover the alteration of his past and initially wants to restore the original timeline. After seeing Lily's scientific brilliance, Martin is proud to be her father. He discovers that he is actually a good father to Lily, and his life with Clarissa in the new timeline is much happier. Despite his mission to protect the timeline, Stein refuses to let Lily be erased. The Legends accept Lily out of their loyalty to Stein, and discover that her presence only causes minimal impacts in the timeline. Like her father, Lily is a scientist with an expertise in nanotechnology, having earned her degrees at Massachusetts Institute of Technology. She occasionally aids the Legends. The character first appeared on The Flash during the "Invasion!" crossover. In season three, she is revealed to be pregnant, by her boyfriend. After Lily's son is born, Stein names his grandson Ronald after Ronnie Raymond, his original partner as Firestorm.

=== Introduced in season three ===
==== Wilbur Bennett ====
Wilbur Bennett (portrayed by Hiro Kanagawa) is the director of the Time Bureau. After he is killed by Grodd, Sharpe replaces him as director.

==== Kuasa ====
Kuasa (portrayed by Tracy Ifeachor) is the granddaughter of Amaya Jiwe, the sister of Mari McCabe and a follower of Mallus who once wielded the water totem of Zambezi which gave her the ability to control water. The water totem is eventually infused with Kuasa, allowing her to change her body into water for various purposes. Anika Noni Rose previously voiced Kuasa on the Vixen animated series.

==== Mallus ====
Mallus (voiced by John Noble) is a mysterious entity that rises, exists, and dies throughout time and is an old enemy of Rip Hunter. He is the main antagonist of season three. To further its goals, Mallus has Eleanor revive her father while possessing her. John Constantine identifies Mallus as a demon who can manipulate time and space. During the final battle in the Old West where Mallus uses Blackbeard, Freydís Eiríksdóttir, and Julius Caesar as pawns, Mallus is ultimately defeated and killed by the Legends using the Totems that cause them to turn into a gigantic Beebo.

- Outside of voicing Mallus, Noble cameos as himself when Ray Palmer visits him on the set of The Lord of the Rings: The Return of the King and has him record a fake rewrite to fool Nora Darhk.

==== Grodd ====
Grodd (voiced by David Sobolov) is a hyper-intelligent gorilla with telepathic powers as a result of being experimented on. He is the former ruler of Gorilla City. When the Legends break the timeline, Grodd is time displaced to the Vietnam War. He tries to take over the Waverider before being knocked out and falling into a napalm fire caused by an air strike. However he is saved by Damien Darhk who persuades him to join him in Mallus' campaign. He first appeared on The Flash.

=== Introduced in season four ===
==== Hank Heywood ====
Henry "Hank" Heywood, Jr. (portrayed by Thomas F. Wilson in the present, Patrick Lubczyk in the 1970s) is the father of Nate Heywood and the son of Henry Heywood, Sr. He is the primary funder of the Time Bureau, but secretly is also involved with something called "Project Hades". When a group of unidentified men attempt to kidnap a creature from the Time Bureau, Hank alters the security footage to attempt to hide their existence. He has also been shown in the company of the demon Neron, disguised as Desmond. When Hank attempts to break off the relationship, Neron kills him. Following his death, Nate discovers that Hank was actually trying to train the magical creatures for a theme park named "Heyworld", based on a drawing Nate had made when he was nine years old, believing it could unify the country. The Legends go on to realize his dream. After Constantine tricks Neron into killing Nate, Hank's ghost meets up with Nate's ghost stating how proud he is of him starting Heyworld. While stating that he loves his son, Hank gives Nate the push needed to bring him back to life.

The 1970 version of the character is encountered by the Legends in season two.

Hank was originally designed as season four's "big bad", an unrepentant antagonist who would torture creatures and turn them into super soldiers, but when the show's writers saw Wilson's performance and got to know him as a person, the character was rewritten as more sympathetic and likable.

==== Dorothy Heywood ====
Dorothy Heywood (portrayed by Susan Hogan) is the wife of Hank Heywood and mother of Nate Heywood.

==== Konane ====
Konane (portrayed by Darien Martin) is a Kaupe, a magical fugitive that is detained by the Time Bureau. He develops a mutual attraction to Mona Wu, who is kind to him, but still struggles with his innately aggressive nature. When a group of unidentified men attempt to kidnap him from the Time Bureau, Mona interferes and helps him escape to Mexico City in 1961, where he becomes a professional wrestler. He is eventually discovered by the Time Bureau with one of its agents shooting him dead. As a result of Mona getting accidentally slashed by Konane, she develops the ability to transform into a Kaupe.

==== Desmond ====
Desmond (portrayed by Christian Keyes) is a barkeep who is the lover of John Constantine. Due to Desmond becoming possessed by Neron as part of a deal to keep him from taking Constantine's soul, Constantine has no choice but to send him to Hell. Neron continues using Desmond's body until being lured out by Constantine and Nora Darhk. With Neron gone, Desmond wakes up, but leaves Constantine, upset about what he reluctantly did to him.

He is closely based on John's boyfriend Oliver from the comic book run Constantine the Hellblazer.

==== Neron ====
Neron is a demon and enemy of John Constantine and the main antagonist in season four. Prior to the events of the season, Neron approached Constantine with the deed to his soul, looking for help in taking over Hell. However, when Constantine refused, Neron made a deal with his lover Desmond, who agreed to bind his soul to Neron's to protect Constantine. When Constantine sent Neron back to Hell, he was also forced to condemn his lover. Throughout the first half of the season, Neron torments Constantine and later begins appearing as Desmond, working alongside Hank Heywood. After killing Heywood, Neron is tricked out of Desmond by Constantine and Nora Darhk, which leads to him possessing Ray Palmer, who agrees to give him full control of his body in exchange for sparing Nate Heywood's life. Neron then forces Constantine to open a portal to hell, which he uses to bring back his lover Tabitha. Neron plans to open a larger portal, powered by fear, to unleash all of hell on Earth. However, Constantine and Nate trick him into breaking his word to Ray by killing Nate. Neron is ejected from Ray's body and killed by Constantine.

==== Tabitha ====
Tabitha (portrayed by Jane Carr) is a fairy godmother who is a magic fugitive hiding in Salem, Massachusetts during the Salem witch trials. Before being banished to Hell by John Constantine, the fairy godmother refuses his offer to become her new host, not wanting to anger the being that is after him. That being is later revealed as the demon Neron, while the fairy godmother is revealed as his lover whom the demon successfully frees from hell. She is forced to serve humans, granting them their wishes, until she manages to trick Nora Darhk into taking her place as the fairy godmother. Tabitha helps Neron in his plan to open a portal to hell and attacks the Legends with a dragon called Wickstable, which originally hatched in young Zari's possession. When young Zari regains control of Wickstable, the dragon eats Tabitha.

=== Introduced in season five ===
==== Lachesis ====
Lachesis (portrayed by Sarah Strange) is a member of the Moirai, or Fates, who made soul coins and took in Astra when she first came to Hell. She is the main antagonist in season five. After learning their sister, Clotho, joined forces with the Legends to retrieve the Loom of Fate, Lachesis and Atropos stole Astra's soul coins and sent Encores to stop them. They offered Astra a place in their ranks, and she seemingly agreed. However, Lachesis knew she intended to betray them, so she killed Astra before forcing Clotho to rejoin her and Atropos. After the Legends killed the latter and destroyed the Loom of Fate, Lachesis imprisoned Clotho in the Museum of Bad Ideas and used Gideon to create an app based on the Loom. Despite encoring several wax figures to help her combat the Legends, they were able to defeat them. Following the fight, Clotho forgave Lachesis and tells her to live her life after realizing she is effectively human without the Loom.

==== Lita ====
Lita (portrayed by Mina Sundwall as a teenager and young adult; seasons 5–6; Emmerson Sadler at ages 5 and 7, Scarlett Jando at ages 8, 9, and 10) is a girl who wrote bad reviews of Mick's books. He and Zari confront her, only to learn that Lita is his and Ali's daughter. In an attempt to help Mick and Lita reconcile, Ava takes him to key moments in her childhood, but it fails to work.

In season six, a 2023 version of Lita is pregnant after she made out with a boy named Niko. While affected by this, Rory meets Niko and advises him to be a good parent for his future grandchild.

==== Atropos ====
Atropos (portrayed by Joanna Vanderham) is a member of the Moirai, or Fates, who control the destinies of every living being. After her sister, Clotho, took the Loom of Fate and scattered it across the multiverse to give everyone free will, she and Lachesis started a quest for vengeance against her. Atropos is described as "a ruthless killing machine with daggers made of bones. Wherever she goes, death follows."

Debuting in "Zari, Not Zari", after Atropos learned Clotho became Charlie and joined the Legends, she attacked them to steal their Loom of Fate fragments. Despite killing Behrad, Sara and Clotho fought Atropos off. Following this, she joined forces with Lachesis to steal Astra's soul coins and use her Encores to impede the Legends' efforts to rebuild the Loom. After several fights with the Legends, Sara killed Atropos by throwing her into the Loom of Fate.

=== Introduced in season six ===
==== Bishop ====
Bishop (portrayed by Raffi Barsoumian; seasons 6–7) is a human clone who contracted Kayla to abduct Sara and other specimens. He is the creator of the Ava Sharpe clones who assist him in his goals to make a hybrid species of humans to live among the stars after witnessing when the destruction of Earth will happen. When Sara found him, Bishop saved her mind when she was succumbing to the Zaguron poison and placed it in a clone body that has Kriblix DNA in it. With help from Mick and Gary, the Ava clones help Sara to shut down Bishop's operation. Kayla later downloaded 94% of Bishop's genome into the Waverider so that he can create a new body. While kept prisoner, Bishop was able to override Gideon due to the other 6% of his genome coming from Sarah. He assisted in delivering Kayla's eggs from Mick's head declaring them the latest members of the Legends. Afterwards, Bishop returns to his confinement while secretly contacting him about helping to restore his magic. While Constantine didn't go with the deal, his dark side took Bishop's offer. He later double-crossed Constantine by spiking a potion he gave him with poison which also caused the Fountain of Imperium to start weakening allowing the Zagurons to invade Earth. With Spooner weakened as a side effect, the Legends got a younger Bishop from 2211 to cure Spooner. After the Zagurons were defeated upon the Fountain of Imperium taking action, Bishop was devoured by Kayla and Mick's offspring and young Bishop was returned to his own time after having his memories wiped.

In season seven, the younger Bishop recovers his memories of the Legends and wipes the memories of a copy of Gideon, intending on using her against them. He was responsible for the second Waverider, the stranding of the Legends in the 1920s, and the robot clones of J. Edgar Hoover and Thomas Edison. After the Gideon copy ejects the Ava clone and creates a robot clone of Bishop to run the company while becoming the Bishop that the Legends will fight, Bishop starts to doubt his campaign. When Gideon wants Bishop to destroy the Legends during the remaining days until the Chernobyl disaster, Bishop flees to the bathroom that Gideon can't view and exits on the ejector toilet. It lands him close to Gwyn Davies' time machine with him caught in its transportation. Later, he makes amends with the Legends and invents a device tied to Gideon's mind to take them to the present. Bishop sacrifices his life to buy the Legends time to escape the Legends' robot clones. He is the main antagonist in the series.

==== Kayla ====
Kayla (portrayed by Aliyah O'Brien in human form) - A Necrian species who is Gary's boss and ex-fiancé. She was the one who abducted Sara since her employer Bishop needs a quintessential human. When Sara freed Spartacus, Kayla devoured him when he tried to attack. Thanks to a tactic by Sara and Gary, Kayla was kicked into a wormhole to Earth at the cost of some containment pods carrying some aliens getting displaced in time. After Mick stepped on Lord Knoxicrillion much to the dismay of the Legends, Mick gathers what they learned from him and states that they should look for Kayla so that she can take them to Sara. She was later found in Cuba during the Cuban Missile Crisis where the Cubans mistook her for the United States' mutant soldiers. When she was freed by the Legends, Kayla put on her Image Inducer ring and agreed to take Mick to where Sara is. Kayla helps to rescue Sara and buys them time to get away from the Zagurons. It was later discovered that Kayla used her tentacles to lay eggs in Mick's ear. Kayla survived the Zaguron attacks and helps Mick and Gary fix the jump drive. Her severed tentacle attacks Gary and she does the Necrian love pinch on Mick upon learning about the eggs. She did that out of an allegiance to someone who helped her escape the planet. That turned out to be Bishop. During the Zaguron invasion, Kayla worked with the Legends to fight the Zagurons.

=== Introduced in season seven ===
==== J. Edgar Hoover Robots ====
Hoover 1.0, Hoover 2.0, and Hoover 3.0 (portrayed by Giacomo Baesatto) are the robot clones of J. Edgar Hoover (also portrayed by Baesatto) created by an alternate Time Master Bishop using the Ava Corporation's cloning technology and an alternate Gideon's computer technology. They are created to protect the timeline from aberrations after Nate accidentally kills the real Hoover in self-defense. Newer versions are sent when the older ones are destroyed.

Hoover 1.0 shows up at the scene where Al Capone's men conspired to kidnap him. He annihilates Capone's men, but is then defeated and discovered to be a robot by Sara and self-destructs.

Hoover 2.0 appears in Chicago and finds the Legends at the Bullet Blondes' performance, where he is apprehended. Zari Tomaz interrogates him and learns that this robot was sent to replace the original, eliminate the Legends, and protect the timeline. When reprogrammed to steal Gwyn Davies' plans for a time machine back from Thomas Edison, he explodes, causing Edison to die of a heart attack, so the second Waverider deposits Hoover 3.0 and Edison 1.0.

== Guest stars ==
The following is a supplementary list of guest stars, some recurring, who appear in lesser roles. The characters are listed in the order in which they first appeared.

=== Introduced in season one ===
- Laurel Lance / Black Canary (portrayed by Katie Cassidy) – An attorney-turned-vigilante and the older sister of Sara. Cassidy stars as the character on Arrow.
- Professor Aldus Boardman (portrayed by Peter Francis James) – A Classics professor at St. Roch University, who is an expert on the story of Chay-Ara / Hawkgirl, Prince Khufu / Hawkman, and Vandal Savage. He is also a son of Hawkman and Hawkgirl in one of their incarnations.
- Lewis Snart (portrayed by Jason Beaudoin) – A former police officer, career criminal, and the estranged abusive father of Leonard Snart / Captain Cold. An older version of the character portrayed by Michael Ironside previously appeared on The Flash.
- Valentina Vostok (portrayed by Stephanie Corneliussen) – An exceptional and vivacious Soviet physicist, who plays a crucial role in determining the fate of the Cold War.
- Mikhail Arkadin (portrayed by Voytek Skrzeta) – An officer of the Soviet Army.
- Cisco Ramon / Vibe (portrayed by Carlos Valdes) – A member of the Flash's S.T.A.R. Labs team that gets "vibes" of certain people through the multiverse. Valdes stars as the character on The Flash.
- John Diggle, Jr. / Green Arrow (portrayed by Joseph David-Jones) – Taking on the alias of Connor Hawke, John Jr. takes up the Green Arrow mantle in the alternate Star City of Earth-16 after the supposed death of Earth-16 Oliver Queen. In Arrow, Connor Hawke and John Diggle, Jr. are separate characters, with David-Jones portraying the former and Charlie Barnett the latter in flashforwards set in the 2040s. John's alias of Connor Hawke is based on the DC Comics character of the same name.
- Grant Wilson / Deathstroke of Earth-16 (portrayed by Jamie Andrew Cutler) – The son of Slade Wilson / Deathstroke, who rules the alternate future Star City of Earth-16 after forming an uprising to take control of the city.
- Gilbert (voiced by Andrew Pifko) – The A.I. of another time ship.
- Lindsay Carlisle (portrayed by Ali Liebert) – A love interest for Sara Lance in the 1950s.
- Betty Seaver (portrayed by Melissa Roxburgh) – A love interest for Jefferson Jackson in the 1950s.
- Ra's al Ghul (portrayed by Matt Nable) – The former leader of the League of Assassins and long-time nemesis of Damien Darhk and the H.I.V.E. organization. Nable appears as the character on Arrow.
- Talia al Ghul (portrayed by Milli Wilkinson) – The daughter of Ra's al Ghul. An older version of the character (portrayed by Lexa Doig) appears on Arrow.
- Per Degaton (portrayed by Cory Grüter-Andrew) – The apprentice of Vandal Savage in the future, which by the influence of him, will become a dictator in his adult age.
- Dr. Bryce (portrayed by Jewel Staite) – A tech genius and roboticist in the future. She is the great-great-great-great-granddaughter of Ray Palmer's twin brother Sydney.
- Jonah Hex (portrayed by Johnathon Schaech) – A former Confederate soldier and morally ambiguous gunslinger in the Old West with knowledge of time travel.
- The Pilgrim (portrayed by Faye Kingslee) – An assassin for the Time Masters who hunts the team by targeting their younger selves in the timeline.
- Quentin Lance (portrayed by Paul Blackthorne) – A Starling City police officer in 2007 and father of Sara and Laurel. Blackthorne also appears as the character in 2016, where he is the captain of the Star City police, while also starring as the character on Arrow. He now serves as Star City's deputy mayor.
- Mary Xavier (portrayed by Celia Imrie) – The adoptive mother of Rip Hunter, who raises orphaned children to become Time Masters.
- Cassandra Savage (portrayed by Jessica Sipos) – The daughter of Vandal Savage. She hails from the year 2166 and serves as a lieutenant to Vandal before the Legends reveal he killed her mother and convince Cassandra to betray him.
- Felicity Smoak (portrayed by Emily Bett Rickards) – An I.T. expert, and former love interest of Ray Palmer. Rickards stars as the character on Arrow.
- Anna Loring (portrayed by Barbara Kottmeier) – The fiancée of Ray Palmer. She was killed by Deathstroke's soldiers.
- Clarissa Stein (portrayed by Isabella Hofmann as an adult, Chanelle Stevenson and Emily Tennant as a younger Clarissa) – Martin Stein's wife and Lily Stein's mother. The former in 1975, and the latter in 1987 and 1992. Hofmann appears as the character on The Flash.
- Nyssa al Ghul (portrayed by Katrina Law) – The daughter of Ra's al Ghul and former lover of Sara Lance. Law appears as the character on Arrow.
- Rex Tyler / Hourman (portrayed by Patrick J. Adams) – A member of the Justice Society of America who warns the Legends of an impending threat before mysteriously fading away. The Legends later encounter a past version of Rex in 1942, later learning that he was murdered by the Reverse-Flash which erased the future version they encountered.

=== Introduced in season two ===
- King Louis XIII (portrayed by Christiaan Westerveld) – The King of France.
- Queen Anne (portrayed by Rebecca Eady) – The queen consort of King Louis XIII.
- Albert Einstein (portrayed by John Rubinstein) – A Nobel Prize-winning physicist.
- Mileva Marić (portrayed by Christina Jastrzembska) – A nuclear physicist and the ex-wife of Albert Einstein.
- Henry Heywood, Sr. / Commander Steel (portrayed by Matthew MacCaull) – The grandfather of Nate Heywood and a member of the Justice Society of America. Based on the DC Comics character of the same name.
- Courtney Whitmore / Stargirl / Merlin (portrayed by Sarah Grey) – A member of the Justice Society of America. Based on the DC Comics character of the same name.
- Charles McNider / Doctor Mid-Nite (portrayed by Kwesi Ameyaw) – A member of the Justice Society of America.
- Todd James Rice / Obsidian (portrayed by Dan Payne in the 1940s and Lance Henriksen in the 1980s) – A member of the Justice Society of America and the son of the Green Lantern Alan Scott.
- Baron Krieger (portrayed by André Eriksen) – A Nazi officer who acquired a super serum from the Reverse Flash and intended to replicate the formula to win World War II.
- Masako Yamashiro (portrayed by Mei Melançon) – Ichiro's daughter and an ancestor of Tatsu Yamashiro from Feudal Japan.
- Ichiro Yamashiro (portrayed by Sab Shimono) – Masako's father and an ancestor of Tatsu Yamashiro from Feudal Japan.
- Ulysses S. Grant (portrayed by John Churchill) – A Union general during the American Civil War who would later become the 18th President of the United States.
- Barry Allen / Flash (portrayed by Grant Gustin) – A Central City assistant police forensic investigator who has superhuman speed. Gustin also voices an older version of Allen that leaves a message for Rip Hunter from the year 2056. Gustin stars as the character on The Flash.
- Quentin Turnbull (portrayed by Jeff Fahey) – Jonah Hex's enemy who creates a time aberration by mining large quantities of dwarf star alloy.
- Agent Smith (portrayed by Jacob Richtor as a young man, Donnelly Rhodes as an old man) – A high-ranking NSA agent. In the 1980s, he is after a Dominator child. In the present, he is involved in the operations that involve contact with the Dominators. When his illegal activities are exposed by Supergirl, Smith is demoted by Susan Brayden and reassigned to Antarctica.
- Susan Brayden (portrayed by Lucia Walters) – The Vice President of the United States who is sworn in as the new President of the United States after the death of her unnamed predecessor at the hands of the Dominators.
- John Diggle / Spartan (portrayed by David Ramsey) – A former military officer and member of Oliver Queen's team. Ramsey stars as the character on Arrow.
- Caitlin Snow / Killer Frost (portrayed by Danielle Panabaker) – A member of the Flash's team at S.T.A.R. Labs. Panabaker stars as the character on The Flash.
- Kara Zor-El / Kara Danvers / Supergirl (portrayed by Melissa Benoist) – Supergirl is a Kryptonian superhero and Barry Allen's friend and ally from Earth-38. Benoist reprises her role from Supergirl.
  - Benoist also portrays her Earth-X counterpart, Overgirl.
- Al Capone (portrayed by Isaac Keoughan) – A crime boss who led the Chicago Outfit. In season seven, Capone sent his men to abduct J. Edgar Hoover, only for them to be taken out by a robot posing as Hoover.
- George Lucas (portrayed by Matt Angel) – An American filmmaker and entrepreneur who creates the Star Wars and Indiana Jones film franchises.
- George Washington (portrayed by Randall Batinkoff) – A man who serves as Commander-in-Chief of the Continental Army during the American Revolutionary War and destined to be one of the founders and first President of the United States.
- Charles Cornwallis (portrayed by Noel Johansen) – A commanding officer of the British Army during the American Revolutionary War.
- King Arthur (portrayed by Nils Hognestad) – The ruler of Camelot. Based on the DC Comics character of the same name.
- Guinevere (portrayed by Elyse Levesque) – The wife of King Arthur. She is based on both the Arthurian character and the character from the DC Comics story Camelot 3000.
- J. R. R. Tolkien (portrayed by Jack Turner) – A second lieutenant for the British Army during the First World War, who would go on to write The Hobbit and The Lord of the Rings.

=== Introduced in season three ===
- Julius Caesar (portrayed by Simon Merrells) – A renowned general and dictator of the Roman Republic.
- P. T. Barnum (portrayed by Billy Zane) – A showman who would later be one of the founders of the Ringling Bros. and Barnum & Bailey Circus.
- Sandy Palmer (portrayed by Susie Abromeit) – Ray Palmer's mother.
- Dominator Queen (voiced by Cissy Jones) – The leader of the Dominators that comes looking for her child in Ivy Town during the 1980s.
- "Gumball" (vocal effects provided by Marc Graue) – A Dominator child that ended up in 1980s Ivy Town.
- Curtis Holt / Mister Terrific (portrayed by Echo Kellum) - is a technological vigilante in Star City and part of Team Arrow. Kellum reprises his role from Arrow.
- Helen of Troy (portrayed by Bar Paly) – A Greek princess during the Trojan War who is time-displaced in 1937 Hollywood. Following the fight with Damien Darhk, Zari Tomaz drops Helen of Troy on the island of Themyscira while history is rewritten to state that Helen of Troy mysteriously disappeared during the Trojan War.
- Cecil B. DeMille (portrayed by Andy Thompson) – A famed film director.
- Hedy Lamarr (portrayed by Celia Massingham) – An inventor and actress who was active during the 1930s and 1940s.
- Dick Rory (portrayed by Evan Jones) – The father of Mick Rory who fought in the Vietnam War.
- Isaac Newton (portrayed by Lawrence Green) – A physicist who discovered gravity and is enlisted by Martin Stein to help him find a way to divide the Firestorm Matrix when the Legends were fighting Gorilla Grodd in Vietnam.
- Lyndon B. Johnson (portrayed by Peter Hall) – The 36th President of the United States who visited Vietnam during the Vietnam War.
- Iris West-Allen (portrayed by Candice Patton) is a member of the S.T.A.R. Labs team and the wife of Barry Allen. Patton reprises her role from The Flash.
- Harrison "Harry" Wells (portrayed by Tom Cavanagh) – A member of Team Flash from Earth-2. Cavanagh reprises his role from The Flash.
  - Harrison "Nash" Wells / Pariah (portrayed by Cavanagh) - A counterpart of Harrison Wells from an unspecified Earth.
- Alex Danvers (portrayed by Chyler Leigh) – Kara Danver's adoptive sister and former agent now head of the D.E.O. from Earth-38. Leigh reprises her role from Supergirl.
- Rene Ramirez / Wild Dog (portrayed by Rick Gonzalez) - A vigilante in Star City and part of Team Arrow. Gonzalez reprises his role from Arrow.
- Dinah Drake / Black Canary (portrayed by Juliana Harkavy) - A meta-human and formerly detective of the Central City Police Department is how part of Team Arrow as the new Black Canary. Harkavy reprises her role from Arrow.
- Ray Terrill / The Ray (portrayed by Russell Tovey) – A displaced hero on Earth-X.
- Wellenreiter's A.I. System (voiced by Susanna Thompson) – Gideon's Earth-X equivalent aboard a timeship owned by the Dark Arrow and designed by Eobard Thawne. Thompson previously starred as Moira Queen on Arrow.
- Leif Erikson (portrayed by Thor Knai) – The leader of the Vikings from Greenland who discovered Vinland.
- Freydís Eiríksdóttir (portrayed by Katia Winter) – The sister of Leif Erikson who wanted to turn what would become North America into New Valhalla.
- Beebo (voiced by Benjamin Diskin) – A toy that Leif Erikson's Vikings mistake as a god. The Legends later turn into a giant Beebo to battle Mallus. He first appeared in "Beebo the God of War".
- Blackbeard (portrayed by Jonathan Cake) – A pirate captain who operates in the West Indies.
- Jesse Wells / Jesse Quick (portrayed by Violett Beane) – A superheroine with superhuman speed from Earth-2, an associate of the Flash, daughter of Dr. Harrison "Harry" Wells, and Wally West's ex-girlfriend. Beane recurs as the character on The Flash. Wells is based on the DC Comics character Jesse Chambers.
- Elvis Presley (portrayed by Luke Bilyk) – A singer who is the "King of Rock and Roll." His guitar contains the Death Totem, which allows him to send ghosts to the afterlife.
- Jesse Garon Presley (portrayed by Luke Bilyk) – The ghost of Elvis Presley's twin brother who was stillborn.
- Lucious Presley (portrayed by Geoffrey Blake) – A preacher who is the uncle of Elvis Presley.
- Barack Obama (portrayed by Lovell Adams-Gray) – The 44th President of the United States who is targeted in his college days by Gorilla Grodd. An adult version of Obama also appeared in Arrow tie-in comics.

=== Introduced in season four ===
- Paul Revere (portrayed by Bruce Crawford) – An American Revolution Patriot who was displaced at the start of Beatlemania until the Legends returned him to his own time after Nate had to cover for him in his Midnight Ride.
- Magical Fugitives - The Magical Fugitives are magical creatures that have been scattered throughout the timeline when the legends defeat Mallus which also enabled them to escape from Mallus' Realm.
  - Unicorn – This particular unicorn has a true demonic appearance and is the first magical fugitive seen where it attacked Woodstock. It takes a spell that is performed by John Constantine to banish it to Hell. In an alternate timeline caused by John Constantine, Sara is struck down by the unicorn leading to the Legends killing the magical fugitives. Constantine uses the Waverider's lasers to destroy the unicorn before it can do the job. This alternate timeline is undone when Constantine fixes it.
  - Plant Creature – An unnamed plant creature who is a magic fugitive. While hiding in prehistoric times, it is brought to the Time Bureau by Nate Heywood and Gary Green. The creature causes trouble for the Time Bureau before being killed by Nate and Gary.
  - Shtriga – A swamp monster and magical fugitive who attacks children at Camp Ogawa in 1995. It poses as camp counselor named Chad Stephens (portrayed by Mason Trueblood). The Shtriga attacks inspired many films like Swamp Thaaaang. When the Legends arrive in 1995 and pose as camp counselors, they fight the Shtriga and kill it.
  - Baba Yaga (portrayed by Natalia Vasiluk) – A magical fugitive who appeared at the 2008 Summer Olympics before being apprehended by the Time Bureau.
  - Chupi the Chupacabra (portrayed by Anthony Moyer) – A magical fugitive who is detained by the Time Bureau.
  - Tagumo – A giant octopus monster who went on a rampage in 1951 Tokyo. The Tagumo is created when Ishirō Honda writes about it in Brigid's diary. It is defeated by Garima. Based on Godzilla.
  - Minotaur (portrayed by Daniel Cudmore) – This Minotaur is a magical fugitive who is sighted in 1920s France. During the planning of Heyworld, the Minotaur is revealed to be a good guitar player.
  - Mike the Spike (voiced by Paul Reubens) – A Dybbuk who is a magical fugitive. He possesses dolls with one instance having Marie Laveau being framed for being a serial killer while taking the name of Mike the Spike. When his doll body is destroyed, he possesses a puppet of Martin Stein and attacks the Legends. By the time John Constantine fixes the timestream, the Legends defeat Mike and arrange for him to be remanded to the Time Bureau's headquarters.
  - Red (portrayed by Wesley MacInnes) – A leprechaun who is an old friend of Charlie. He is hiding out in Las Vegas. Due to Constantine having tampered with the timestream, Red is killed by Mick, Nate and Ray.
  - Sunjay (portrayed by Sachin Bhatt) – A man born thousands of years ago, who gathered Kamadeva's ashes after the Hindu god of love was immolated by Shiva.
  - Mummy (portrayed by Alexander J. Baxter) – A magical fugitive who is detained by the Legends.
  - Púca (portrayed by Devyn Dalton) – An innocent magical creature threatened by Constantine's ancestor King Kon-sten-tyn in 55 BCE.
  - Frederic (portrayed by John DeSantis) – An ogre and magical fugitive who is detained by the Legends. He is revealed to be a good singer when the Legends are coming up with the plans for Heyworld.
  - Cyclops - A one-eyed monster and magical fugitive who is detained by the Legends.
  - Gnome - An unnamed gnome and magical fugitive who is detained by the Legends.
  - Orc - An unnamed orc and magical fugitive who is detained by the Legends.
  - Sassy - A Bigfoot and magical fugitive who is detained by the Legends.
  - Wickstable / Mithra – A dragon that hatches from an egg that was accidentally left at a younger Zari's house in 2019. She names it "Mithra". When it is apprehended by Neron's forces, Tabitha ages it and uses it to attack Heyworld. When a younger Zari regains control of Wickstable, it eats Tabitha before regressing back to a baby.
- Jerry Garcia (portrayed by Rob McEachern) – The lead singer of Grateful Dead who performed at Woodstock. Nate takes marijuana from Garcia as one of the ingredients needed to banish the unicorn back to Hell.
- Jimi Hendrix (portrayed by Shane Symons) – A rock star and guitarist who performed at Woodstock. The Legends take a Shaman from Hendrix as one of the ingredients needed to banish the unicorn back to Hell.
- Janis Joplin (portrayed by Sara Rabey) – A rock star who performed at Woodstock. The Legends take a lock from Joplin as one of the ingredients needed to banish the unicorn back to Hell.
- Queen Elizabeth II (portrayed by Gwenda Lorenzetti) – The Queen of the United Kingdom who the Legends encounter in the 1970s. She is impersonated by Charlie.
- Ishirō Honda (portrayed by Eijiro Ozaki) – A Japanese film director and screenwriter who is known for his work in projects that involve Kaiju and Tokusatsu characters. He wrote about the Tagumo in Brigid's diary that brought it to life. Honda witnessed the fight between the Legends, Tagumo, and Garima. Following the fight, Mick gave Honda the inspiration to pitch an idea for Godzilla by quoting that "lizards are kings."
- Garima (portrayed by Vesna Ennis) – A swordswoman and Queen of Thanzanon who is a character in a story that Mick Rory is writing about. She is brought to life by Mick using Brigid's diary.
- Ernest Hemingway (portrayed by Andrew Lees) – An American journalist, novelist, and short-story writer who the Legends encounter in a Salon in Paris during their search for the Minotaur.
- F. Scott Fitzgerald (portrayed by Jason McKinnon) – An American fiction writer during the Jazz Age who the Legends encounter in a Salon in Paris during their search for the Minotaur.
- Zelda Fitzgerald (portrayed by Meganne Young) – American socialite, novelist, painter and wife of author F. Scott Fitzgerald who the Legends encounter in a Salon in Paris during their search for the Minotaur.
- Marie Laveau (portrayed by Joyce Guy) – A Voodoo practitioner and the great-grandmother of Desmond.
- Marilyn Monroe (portrayed by Jocelyn Panton) – An actress, model, and singer. Charlie poses as her when visiting Las Vegas in the 1960s.
- El Cura (portrayed by Frank Gallegos) – A Mexican professional wrestler whose career is ruined when Konane begins wrestling as El Lobo. El Cura seems to be based on El Santo.
- Richard Nixon (portrayed by Paul Ganus) – The 37th President of the United States, who loses his ability to lie after a roach, an agent of Maat, enters him.
- Triumvirate – A group of demons that rule Hell and are in competition with Neron.
  - Beelzebub (portrayed by Bill Croft) – Part of the Triumvirate.
  - Belial (portrayed by Mel Tuck) – Part of the Triumvirate.
  - Satan (portrayed by Beau Daniels) – Part of the Triumvirate.
- Calibraxis (portrayed by Jason Simpson) – A demon with a personal vendetta against John Constantine. He is destroyed by Nora Darhk.
- Mar Novu / Monitor (portrayed by LaMonica Garrett) - A Multiversal being testing different Earths in the multiverse in preparation for an impending "crisis". He was watching the Legends at Heyworld during their fight with Neron.

=== Introduced in season five ===
- Kal-El / Clark Kent / Superman (portrayed by Tyler Hoechlin) - The cousin of Supergirl who defends Metropolis. Hoechlin stars as the character on Supergirl.
- Lex Luthor (portrayed by Jon Cryer) - The enemy of Superman and Supergirl. Cryer stars as the character on Supergirl.
- Nia Nal / Dreamer (portrayed by Nicole Maines) - A Naltorian ally of Supergirl's with precognition. Maines stars as the character on Supergirl.
- J'onn J'onzz / Martian Manhunter (portrayed by David Harewood) - A Green Martian and ally of Supergirl. Harewood stars as the character on Supergirl.
- Lois Lane (portrayed by Elizabeth Tulloch) - The wife of Superman and reporter for the Daily Planet. Tulloch stars as the character on Supergirl.
- Kate Kane / Batwoman (portrayed by Ruby Rose) - The cousin of Bruce Wayne who protects Gotham City after he and his alter-ego of Batman go missing. Rose stars as the title character on Batwoman.
- Lyla Michaels (portrayed by Audrey Marie Anderson) - The director of A.R.G.U.S. who became the Harbinger while working for the Monitor. Anderson stars as the character on Arrow.
- Ryan Choi (portrayed by Osric Chau) - A scientist from Ivy Town who was recruited to help avert the Crisis.
- Jefferson Pierce / Black Lightning (portrayed by Cress Williams) - A teacher with electrical powers originally from an unspecified Earth who was recruited to help avert Crisis before his Earth was merged with Earth-1 and Earth-38 to become Earth-Prime. Williams stars as the title character on Black Lightning.
- Joslyn "Joss" Jackam / Weather Witch (portrayed by Reina Hardesty) - The estranged daughter of Weather Wizard who wields a meta-tech staff that enables her to control the weather and an enemy of the Flash. When Earth-Prime has been formed, Supergirl encounters her near the harbor. Before Weather Witch can attack Supergirl, she is taken down by Flash who states that she is one of his enemies. Hardesty reprises her role from The Flash.
- Marv (portrayed by Marv Wolfman) - A man who gets an autograph from Supergirl and Flash.
- Sargon the Sorcerer (portrayed by Raúl Herrera) - A magician who used an illusion of Beebo as a diversion while he robbed a bank before being confronted and defeated by Flash and Sara Lance.
- President Shaw (portrayed by Eileen Pedde) - An unnamed President on Earth-Prime who addresses the nation about the Anti-Monitor's defeat and Green Arrow's sacrifice.
- The Encores - The Encores are several evil historical figures who were granted second chances at life and cannot die by traditional means as a portion of their souls are bound to Hell. Mona Wu was the one who came up with their name.
  - Grigori Rasputin (portrayed by Michael Eklund) - A Russian mystic and self-proclaimed holy man who befriended Tsar Nicholas II's family and was killed by Dmitri Pavlovich. Astra encored him, enabling Rasputin to rise from the grave and lead his followers into getting revenge on Pavlovich. Ray kills Rasputin, with Astra recalling his spirit to Hell.
  - Bugsy Siegel (portrayed by Jonathan Sadowski) - The "most infamous and feared gangster of the day" who was shot by an unknown assailant at his girlfriend Virginia Hill's home. Astra not only encored him, but also gave him a gun with bullets capable of destroying souls. Upon his revival, Siegel quickly regains power and gets the police on his side. When the Legends detain him, Constantine brings Siegel to Hell to be shot with his own gun.
  - Kathy Meyers (portrayed by Beth Riesgraf) - The mother of Freddy Meyers who became the masked "Prom Night Slasher" in 1989 as she did not want to lose her son and attacked Central City High, only for him to take the blame for her crimes. She later died of a heart attack when Freddy was executed in 2004. After being resurrected by Astra, Kathy gains telepathy and invulnerability. Kathy goes about tying up loose ends by attacking the memorial reunion, especially Tifanny - the sole survivor of her initial attack. In 1989, Behrad knocks out Kathy and leaves her for the police, retroactively killing her future self and undoing the deaths she had caused. Unlike the other Encores, who are historical figures, Kathy is fictional; she is based on horror film characters Michael Myers and Pamela Voorhees.
  - Genghis Khan (portrayed by Terry Chen) - The founder and emperor of the Mongol Empire, which became the largest contiguous empire in history after his death. As an Encore, Khan gains a special sword capable of destroying anyone impaled by it. After Khan breaks out of his tomb in the 1990s, he takes control of the Triads to force Prince Charles to transfer control of Hong Kong to him before Charlie kills him.
  - Jack the Ripper (portrayed by Timothy Lyle) - An infamous serial killer from the late 19th century. As an Encore, Jack is given a hell scalpel and sent to 1918 England to find the final Loom of Fate fragment. During his search, he is knocked out by Constantine, who assumes his identity. Jack later regains consciousness and tries to help Bonnie and Clyde, only to accidentally kill the latter with his hell knife before Constantine kills him with Black Caesar's Hell Gun.
  - Bonnie Parker and Clyde Barrow (portrayed by Abby Ross and Ben Sullivan) - An infamous criminal duo and lovers from the early 20th century. As part of the Encores, Bonnie and Clyde are given Hell guns and are sent to 1918 England to find the final Loom of Fate fragment. They take out fellow Encores Henry VIII, Marcus Jonius Brutus, and Black Caesar before confronting Constantine and Zari. After Clyde is accidentally killed by Jack the Ripper, Bonnie tries to kill Jack, only for Zari to redirect the bullets back at her.
  - Henry VIII (portrayed by Chris Gauthier) - The King of England from 1509 to 1547 who was known for his six marriages. Lachesis gave his soul a second chance at life and sent him to 1918 England to look for the final Loom of Fate fragment, only for him to be killed by Clyde Barrow.
  - Black Caesar (portrayed by Sean Millington) - An African pirate from the 18th century. Lachesis gave his soul a second chance at life as well as a Hell compass and Hell gun before sending him to 1918 England to look for the final Loom of Fate fragment. He is killed by Clyde Barrow, who confiscates his hell items.
  - Marcus Junius Brutus (portrayed by Peter Ciuffo) - A Roman senator and participant in assassinating Julius Caesar. Lachesis gave his soul a second chance at life and sent him to 1918 England to look for the final Loom of Fate fragment, only for him to be killed by Bonnie Parker.
  - Caveman Criminal - An unidentified caveman. Lachesis gave his soul a second chance at life and brought him to life as a wax statue in the Museum of Bad Ideas to fight the Legends.
  - Caligula - One of the worst and most violent emperors of the Roman Empire who ruled from the year 37 to the year 41. Lachesis gave his soul a second chance at life and brought him to life as a wax statue in the Museum of Bad Ideas to fight the Legends.
  - George Armstrong Custer - A lieutenant colonel who led his soldiers against the Lakota, the Northern Cheyenne, and the Arapaho in the Battle of the Little Bighorn, where he died in battle. Lachesis gave his soul a second chance at life and brought him to life as a wax statue in the Museum of Bad Ideas to fight the Legends.
  - Vlad the Impaler - The Voivode of Wallachia from 1448 to 1477. Lachesis gave his soul a second chance at life and brought him to life as a wax statue in the Museum of Bad Ideas to fight the Legends.
  - Joseph Stalin - The dictator of the Soviet Union from the 1920s to 1953. Lachesis gave his soul a second chance at life and brought him to life as a wax statue in the Museum of Bad Ideas to fight the Legends.
  - Charles Manson - The leader of the Manson Family cult who committed a series of murders. Lachesis gave his soul a second chance at life and brought him to life as a wax statue in the Museum of Bad Ideas to fight the Legends.
- Nicholas II (portrayed by Ryan Elm) - The last known Tsar of Russia.
- Alexandra Feodorovna (portrayed by Luisa Jojic) - The wife of Nicholas II who was the object of Rasputin's obsession.
- Freddy Meyers (portrayed by Seth Meriwether as a teenager, Garrett Quirk as an adult) - The son of Kathy Meyers who took the blame for his mother's crimes as the Prom Night Slasher to protect her and was executed by electric chair in 2004. Three of the Legends went back to 1989 to set him right by fixing his prom night, procuring him a date with Tiffany, and stopping his mother. In the new timeline that followed, Freddy survived and married Tiffany.
- Tiffany Harper (portrayed by Jasmine Vega as a teenager, Veronika London as an adult) - A student of Central City High's Class of 1989, love interest of Freddy Meyers, and the sole survivor of the Prom Night Slasher's first attack before being killed during the 2004 memorial reunion. When the Legends went back to 1989 to save Freddy's prom night, they successfully convinced Tiffany to ask him out, stopped Freddy's tormentors from pulling a prank on him, and foiled the Prom Night Slasher. As a result, Tiffany's death was undone and she married Freddy.
- Ali (portrayed by Pascal Lamothe-Kipness as a teenager, Lisa Marie DiGiacinto as an adult) - A student of Central City High's Class of 1989 and Mick's ex-girlfriend. She was originally one of the Prom Night Slasher's victims before the Legends stopped her, averting Ali's death. In 2004, Mick reconnected with her and inadvertently conceived a daughter with her.
- Napoleon Bonaparte (portrayed by Kazz Leskard) - A French military leader who crowned himself the Emperor of France during the early 1800s. When Marie Antoinette was encored and granted magical perfume to make everyone attracted to her, a younger version of Napoleon from the 1790s was made part of her entourage before the Legends stopped her.
- DJ S'More Money (portrayed by Ryan Bell) - A musician who wears a s'more mask and is Zari's ex-boyfriend. He is a spoof of Marshmello.
- Pippa (portrayed by Madeline Hirvonen) - One of Nora's charges. She and Nora attempted to make Constantine feel better after Astra tampered with his soul coin. Ray later babysat Pippa when Nora's father Damien Darhk visited her. After the Darhks came to blows over her life, Pippa wished them into an episode of Mr. Parker's Cul-De-Sac so they could work out their issues. Following this, Pippa released Nora from her servitude.
- Prince Charles (portrayed by Chris Robson) - The Prince of Wales who oversaw the handover of Hong Kong. He was targeted by Genghis Khan, who wanted Charles to give the city to him, but Charlie used her shapeshifting powers to fool Khan while the Legends kept the real Charles safe.
- Bulldog Cane (voiced by Robin Atkin Downes) - A bulldog-headed cane that Constantine briefly talks while Astra interferes with his life.
- Mr. Parker (portrayed by Erik Gow) - The host of Mr. Parker's Cul-De-Sac (a parody of Mister Rogers' Neighborhood).
- William Shakespeare (portrayed by Rowan Schlosberg) - An English playwright and actor. The Legends come to his time in search of a ring connected to the Loom of Fate while he is working on Romeo and Juliet's ending, only to become inspired by them to write a superhero version of the story after they failed to erase his memories correctly. At Sara's behest, the Legends undo their mistake and fill in for a performance of the play.
- Enchantress (portrayed by Samantha Liane Cole) - An immortal magic-user and associate of Constantine's. In ancient Egypt, Clotho visited Enchantress to solicit her help in hiding the final Loom of Fate fragment. In 1918 England, Enchantress posed as an old woman named Mrs. Hughes (portrayed by Marion Eisman) and ran a boarding house, which Constantine, Zari, and a group of Encores visited while in search of the fragment. After the Legends defeat the Encores and retrieve the fragment, Constantine alludes to Mrs. Hughes' true identity before he and Zari take their leave as Enchantress secretly hints at seeing him again.
- Marchosias (voiced by Andrew Morgado) - A hellhound that Son of Sam claimed persuaded him to kill. Gary accidentally brought him on to the Waverider following a trip to Hell, believing he was a Jack Russel Terrier and adopted him as an emotional support animal. Marchosias manipulated the Legends into committing malicious acts before Sara, Constantine, and Astra confronted him and sent him back to Hell.
- Dionysus (portrayed by Drew Tanner) - The god of wine from Greek mythology who operated at Hudson University under the alias of Dion. The Legends visited him to get the Chalice of Dionysus from him and succeeded despite his attempts to stop them.

Sisqó cameos as an animatronic of himself that sings "Thong Song" during the Legends' fight with the Encores in the Museum of Bad Ideas.

The following make uncredited cameos from their respective DC-based shows during the epilogue of "Crisis on Infinite Earths":

- Brec Bassinger as Courtney Whitmore / Stargirl, Anjelika Washington as Beth Chapel / Doctor Mid-Night, Yvette Monreal as Yolanda Montez / Wildcat, and Cameron Gellman as Rick Tyler / Hourman appear from the then-upcoming TV series Stargirl (set on Earth-2).
- Teagan Croft as Rachel Roth, Anna Diop as Koriand'r / Starfire, Alan Ritchson and Minka Kelly as Hank Hall / Hawk and Dawn Granger / Dove, and Curran Walters as Jason Todd / Robin appear from Titans (set on Earth-9).
- April Bowlby as Rita Farr / Elasti-Girl, Diane Guerrero as Jane, Joivan Wade as Victor Stone / Cyborg, Riley Shanahan as Cliff Steele / Robotman, and Matthew Zuk as Larry Trainor / Negative Man appear from Doom Patrol (set on Earth-21).
- Archival footage of Derek Mears as Swamp Thing is used from his self-titled TV series (set on Earth-19).

=== Introduced in season six ===
- David Bowie (portrayed by Thomas Nicholson) - An English singer and songwriter who witnessed Sara's alien abduction. After giving the footage of the abductions to the Legends, Bowie has his memories wiped.
- Spartacus (portrayed by Shawn Roberts) - A Gladiator who led his fellow slaves in the Third Servile War. While history stated that Spartacus had perished and his body was never recovered, he was actually abducted by Kayla's kind and placed in a containment pod. After a brief fight with a dangerous alien that was accidentally freed, Sara and Spartacus find the main deck of the ship where the aliens are. Spartacus tried to attack Kayla only to be ensnared and devoured.
- Giant Air Feeder - An alien moth whose container holding its cocoon was dripping the liquid that the Beemans were using for Big Bang Burger's secret sauce back in 1950. Anyone who had consumed the liquid started having major cravings for meat. When the Giant Air Feeder hatched, it ate Rhonda Beeman and later ate Bert before being shot by Esperanza Spooner.
- Bert Beeman (portrayed by Greg Kean) - The manager of Big Bang Burger in 1950. He is eaten by the Giant Air Feeder.
- Rhonda Beeman (portrayed by Kirsten Robeck) - The wife of Bert Beeman in 1950. She was the one who made use of the liquid from the cocoon to make Big Bang Burger's secret sauce. When Ava got close, Rhonda knocked her out and the other Legends managed to rescue her. When the cocoon hatched, Rhonda was eaten by the Giant Air Feeder.
- Sandy Sledge (portrayed by Naiah Cummins) - A waitress at Big Bang Burger in 1950 who became one of the people affected by the alien moth's liquid that caused anyone that consumed it to have major cravings for meat. After the alien moth and the Beemans were killed, Sandy took over the restaurant and renamed it Big Belly Burger.
- Zagurons - A race of reptilian humanoids with poisonous tongues.
- Amelia Earhart (portrayed by Jen Oleksiuk) - A pilot who went missing when circumnavigating the globe with Fred Noonan. It turns out that she was taken to another planet where she woke to find Fred missing. Sara and Gary found her there and found that she was put through alien conversion when she started repeating some words and poisoned Sara with her poisonous tongue. Bishop later mentioned that Amelia Earhart was spliced with the DNA of a Zaguron as part of his experiments which would explain the poisonous tongue. She later hijacked the Waverider and ran into the Legends. Amelia later died with the Zaguron half of her took over her body.
- Lord Knoxicrillion (voiced by Andrew Morgado) - An Archai from the planet Arcane who uses high-tech armor. He was one of the captives of Kayla before his pod got dumped into the timestream and he arrived in the year 2045 where he competed on the televised talent show Da Throne (a futuristic spoof of America's Got Talent) in a misguided plot to rule Earth. After being defeated in the competition by Zari, Lord Knoxicrillion showed respect to her. Upon emerging from his armor, Knoxicrillion was stepped on by Mick Rory.
- John F. Kennedy (portrayed by Aaron Craven) - The 35th President of the United States.
- Robert F. Kennedy (portrayed by Preston Vanderslice) - A United States Senator and the brother of John F. Kennedy.
- Fidel Castro (portrayed by Tim Perez) - A Commandant in Cuba who served as the Prime Minister of Cuba during the Cuban Missile Crisis. At one point, he mistook Behrad as Che Guevara's cousin Jay.
- General Kilgore (portrayed by Nic Bishop) - A US general that tried to lead a military retaliation against Cuba much to the dismay of John F. Kennedy. He was killed by a dud missile.
- Aleister Crowley (voiced by Matt Lucas) - The soul of an occultist that Constantine once summoned and later imprisoned in a portrait. After hooking Constantine up with Noelle who had the map to the Fountain of Imperium, Aleister was later given to Noelle in exchange for some potions.
- Robert Truss (portrayed by Russell Roberts) - The neighbor of Constantine who offends Astra.
- Levi Stapleton (portrayed by Nic Bishop) - The Sheriff of Fist City, Oklahoma during the American frontier who obtained a whistle that can control the Haverath. After being disarmed of it by Sara Lance during a shootout, Levi is eaten by the Haverath.
- Haverath - A giant worm-like alien that detects rage and excretes gold that was found in Fist City, Oklahoma during the American frontier after its pod got dumped into the timestream from Kayla's ship. Sheriff Stapleton used a special whistle to control it while the people took advantage of the gold it excreted. The Haverack was later vanquished by Astra Logue.
- Irma Rose (portrayed by AnnaLynne McCord) - A civilian of Fist City, Oklahoma during the American frontier.
- Bass Reeves (portrayed by David Ramsey) - A Deputy U.S. Marshall.
- Gus-Gus - A Gusarax. He was one of the captives of Kayla before his pod got dumped into the timestream and ending up in Vancouver during 2023. Due to Spooner, Gus-Gus' pod crashed on to the set of "Bud Stuy" where Kamran Saaed planned to use it as breakout character while mistaking it for an animatronic. Due to Gus-Gus bonding with Kamran and causing a strain between the Saeed Brothers, the Legends had to work to get Gus-Gus off the show due to the current direction affecting Behrad's future. Nate was successful in getting it away with fruit snacks while improvising his role as a nosy landlord while the others got the Saaed Brothers to reconcile. When Gus-Gus matures, the Legends send him to another location.
- Imran Saeed (portrayed by Shawn Ahmed) - An actor in 2023 who is the star of Bud Stuy.
- Kamran Saeed (portrayed by Saad Siddiqui) - The director of Bud Stuy and Imran's brother.
- Niko (portrayed by Louis Lay) - Lita's boyfriend in 2023 who impregnated her. Upon finding out, Mick confronted Niko and advised him to be a good parent for his future grandchild.
- Fernando (portrayed by Ricardo Ortiz, voiced by Hector Meneu Hueso) - A mute boy living during the Spanish Civil War who came into contact with the Fountain of Imperium.
- Captain Noriega (portrayed by Leo Rano) - A Spanish captain during the Spanish Civil War who led the expedition for the Fountain of Imperium on Adolf Hitler's behalf following the Siege of Madrid.
- El Gato (portrayed by Alexander Soto) - The uncle of Fernando.
- Noelle (portrayed by Melissa Farman) - A vampire banker who is Aleister Crowley's contact. She supplied the map to the Fountain of Imperium to John Constantine. After the mission ended in failure, John Constantine traded Aleister Crowley's portrait to Noelle in exchange for some magic potions.
- Buddy (portrayed by Alvin Sanders) - The proprietor of the outer space bowling alley Galaxy Lanes until the Pin Killers took control of it. He offered some advice to Sara when her team isn't functioning well against the Pin Killers in a bowling match. After the Pin Killers are defeated and left, Buddy regains control of Galaxy Lanes. When he sees Constantine when the rest of the Legends enter, Buddy states to himself that Constantine's powers will be the death of him.
- Pin Killers - A bowling team of human-shaped aliens who took control of Galaxy Lanes and uses the planets as their bowling balls when facing off against their opponents from the planets. In addition, they locked the doors to Galaxy Lanes and used puzzle boxes to invite their opponents to Galaxy Lanes. Anyone who fails against them has their planet claimed as a trophy by the Pin Killers. The Legends were able to defeat the Pin Killers who then give back Earth and then storm off allowing Buddy to reclaim control over Galaxy Lanes.
  - Mike the Strike (portrayed by Nic Bishop) - The captain of the Pin Killers.
  - Clare the Spare (portrayed by Emily Bandel) - Member of the Pin Killers.
  - Merve the Curve (portrayed by Michael McIntyre) - Member of the Pin Killers.
- Gloria Cruz (portrayed by Alexandra Castillo) - The mother of Esperanza "Spooner" Cruz who is a healer.

=== Introduced in season seven ===
- J. Edgar Hoover (portrayed by Giacomo Baesatto) - The first Director of the Federal Bureau of Investigation who got attracted to the explosion caused by Astra trying to use her magic to restore it when he was hunting the Midland Gang. He is accidentally killed by Nate in self-defense causing Gary to eat his body. Nate used a special potion to pose as Hoover until it wore off around the point where Al Capone's men conspired to abduct Hoover.
- Eddie (portrayed by Hazma Fouad) - A bartender at a speakeasy that the Legends meet while avoiding a J. Edgar Hoover robot.
- Ross Bottoni (portrayed by Sage Brocklebank) - A gangster who is the landlord of the speakeasy that Eddie works at. Astra, Spooner, and Gideon were able to thwart him by exploiting his fear of spiders.
- Maude (portrayed by Aubrey Reynolds) - The lead singer of the Masqueradies and Botini's abused girlfriend.
- Thomas Edison (portrayed by Christopher Britton) - An inventor who developed many devices in fields such as electric power generation, mass communication, sound recording, and motion pictures.. Gwyn Davies used to work for him before Edison fired him and stole his plans for a time machine. When the J. Edgar Hoover robot explodes when reprogrammed to steal back the plans, Edison dies of a heart attack caused by the reaction of this.
  - Thomas Edison Robot (also portrayed by Britton) - A robot clone of Thomas Edison created by Gideon using her technology and Bishop's cloning technology. When Edison died of a heart attack, the second Waverider deposited a Thomas Edison robot to replace the original Edison as it is assisted by the J. Edgar Hoover robot.
- Erwin Baker (portrayed by Matthew Clarke) - A motorcycle and automobile racer who helps Astra, Spooner, and Gideon get to New York.
- Mr. Staples (portrayed by Jason Gray-Stanford) - The head of an airplane factory in 1943 who Astra accidentally freezes temporarily.
- Eleanor Roosevelt (portrayed by Christine Willes) - The wife of Franklin D. Roosevelt.
- General Kalashnik (portrayed by Ego Mikitash) - A general that operated in Chernobyl on the day of the Chernobyl disaster. Due to Gwyn Davies doing a broadcast that resulted in an evacuation of Chernobyl, the robot Legends had to wreck his convoy and have him do a false alarm broadcast to make sure the Chernobyl disaster's original history remains intact.
- Dr. Irina Petro (portrayed by Stefanie von Pfetten) - A scientist working in Chernobyl that was already gone when Gwyn Davies' evacuation broadcast was made. With Petrov also sought by the KGB, Robot Sara was sent to kill Dr. Petrov so that the Chernobyl disaster's original history remains intact. While Robot Sara was hesitant and faked her death to fool the KGB, she was later reprogrammed and met up with Dr. Petrov days later where she succeeded in her mission.
- Harris Ledes (portrayed by Giles Panton) - A demon in Hell and head of Lowest Common Demoninator Productions. He was behind the Cursed Crew that cut a deal with him to film something that would make all of Hell impressed. With Behrad counseling the Legends, this frees the Cursed Crew from their fate much to Harris' dismay.
- Time Authority (portrayed by Timothy Webber) - A bartender in an otherworldly bar called The Fixed Point Bar that is frequented by time travelers. He and the time travelers with him are later killed by the Robot Legends.
- Franz Ferdinand (portrayed by Marc Gaudet) - The archduke of Austria who was assassinated which started World War I. The Legends had to talk Eobard Thawne's temporal duplicate into delaying Ferdinand's death.
- Sophie, Duchess of Hohenberg (portrayed by Keara Barnes) - The wife of Archduke Ferdinand.
- Alun Thomas (portrayed by Tom Forbes) - A soldier and best friend of Gwyn Davies who died during World War I. The real one was later saved by the Legends at the cost of Nate's abilities.
  - Alun Thomas Robot (also portrayed by Forbes) - A robot clone of Alun Thomas. Noting that Alun's death is a fixed point, Gideon obtained Alun's DNA sample and made a robot clone of Alun to appease Gwyn. Upon finding out, Gwyn removed the CPU of Alun and planned to find him.
- Mike / Booster Gold (portrayed by Donald Faison) - A fixer in 1916 by his supervisors who makes sure the fixed point there does not get affected. After supposedly agreeing to help the Legends save Alun, he hijacks the Waverider, bombs Gwyn Davies' time machine, and makes off with the Waverider to confront his superiors. When the Waverider returns, the Legends find Mike on the bridge in handcuffs as the rest of the Time Police emerge to arrest the Legends. It was during this time that the Legends learn that Mike also goes by the name of Booster Gold.

== See also ==
- List of Arrow characters
- List of The Flash characters
- List of Supergirl characters
- List of Arrowverse actors
