= Knocked Down, Knocked Up =

- Legends of Tomorrow episode
- Episode no.: Season 7 Episode 13
- Directed by: Kevin Mock
- Written by: Phil Klemmer; Keto Shimizu
- Production code: T13.23213
- Original air date: March 2, 2022

Guest appearances
- Donald Faison as Mike / Booster Gold; Tom Forbes as Alun Thomas

Episode chronology
← Previous "Too Legit to Quit"	Next → —
- Legends of Tomorrow season 7

"Knocked Down, Knocked Up" is the premature series finale of the American science fiction television series Legends of Tomorrow, revolving around the eponymous team of superheroes and their time traveling adventures. It is the thirteenth episode of the seventh season, and the series' 110th episode overall. The series is set in the Arrowverse, sharing continuity with the other television series of the universe. The episode was written by executive producers Phil Klemmer and Keto Shimizu, and directed by Kevin Mock. It premiered on March 2, 2022, on The CW to generally positive reviews from critics.

== Plot ==
Gary Green, having been sent flying out of the Waverider, (Note: As seen in "Too Legit to Quit") ultimately lands in 30,000 B.C., but opens a portal to return to Constantine's manor. Gwyn Davies has time traveled to 1916 Mametz Wood, France to prevent the death of Alun Thomas, his best friend who he's in love with. However, Alun's death is a fixed point, protected by the fixers, and can not be altered, Gwyn is killed in the process. Gary deduces that Sara Lance is pregnant (due to her alien biology) and her regenerative abilities transfer to the baby. The Legends learn of Gwyn's death and travel back to save him, but are intercepted by human Gideon who tells them to leave. Astra Logue and Spooner Cruz convince her to turn against AI Gideon, who uploads herself into a clone body. Gideon disables the Waverider's cloaking, causing her clone to become an anomaly. She self-destructs in the Temporal Zone, but Astra shields her group and rebuilds the Waverider.

The others meet with Mike, the fixer protecting the point. Gwyn realizes that since Alun's death inspired him to invent time travel, anyone attempting to change the battle would be erased in a time paradox making Mike feel useless. He destroys Gwyn's machine and steals the Waverider to talk to his superiors. Nate Heywood runs off to rescues Alun from mustard gas but loses his powers in the process. Afterward, Sara reveals her pregnancy to Ava Sharpe, while Nate retires to the Wind Totem to settle down with Zari Tomaz who has also retired from the team. Mike returns with the Waverider, but he and the Legends are arrested by his superiors for attempting to alter the timeline.

== Production ==
=== Writing ===
The episode was co-written by executive producers Phil Klemmer and Keto Shimizu. In a March 2022 interview with SyFy Wire, Klemmer said that they had the intent to include Booster Gold in the series ever since its inception. If the series was renewed then the character would have returned. Klemmer said, "It's just interesting to imagine what his dynamic is going to be with the team". While the episode was not intended to be the series finale, it ended up being so as Legends of Tomorrow was canceled in April 2022, ending the series on a cliffhanger.

=== Casting ===
The episodes saw appearances from main cast members Caity Lotz, Tala Ashe, Jes Macallan, Olivia Swann, Adam Tsekhman, Shayan Sobhian, Lisseth Chavez, Amy Louise Pemberton, Nick Zano and Matt Ryan playing Sara Lance, Zari Tarazi, Ava Sharpe, Astra Logue, Gary Green, Behrad Tarazi, Spooner Cruz, both human and AI Gideon, Nate Heywood, and Gwyn Davies respectively. Had the series been renewed for another season, this would have been Zano's final appearance as a series regular.

On February 22, it was announced that Donald Faison would be guest starring in the season seven finale in an undisclosed role, which was revealed to be Booster Gold. Faison would have been promoted to series regular had the series been renewed for an eighth season. Tom Forbes guest stars as Alun Thomas.

=== Filming ===
"Knocked Down, Knocked Up" was directed by Kevin Mock. Filming of the episode began on December 3, 2021 and concluded on December 16. In an interview, Mock said that a few of Faison's scenes were not in the original script but added due to the fact that they enjoyed working together.

== Release ==
"Knocked Down, Knocked Up" was first aired in the United States on The CW on March 2, 2022. It was watched by 440 thousand viewers with a 0.08 share among adults aged 18 to 49.

On July 19, 2022, the episode was released as a part of the Legends of Tomorrow season seven box set for both DVD and Blu-ray.

=== Reception ===
The episode received generally positive reviews from critics. Jarrod Jones of The A.V. Club gave the episode an A−. Writing for CBR, Zeid Abughazaleh said, "As one door closes, hundreds more open up as the Legends of Tomorrow wave off another season". In a Collider article written after the CW canceled the series, Usama Masood wrote, "If anything, the finale retcons the original idea that The Legends will be unknown heroes in the future, making their ending even more suitable".
