= Legends of Tomorrow season 5 =

Legends of Tomorrow
- Season 5
- Promotional poster
- Starring: Brandon Routh; Caity Lotz; Maisie Richardson-Sellers; Tala Ashe; Jes Macallan; Courtney Ford; Olivia Swann; Amy Louise Pemberton; Nick Zano; Dominic Purcell; Matt Ryan
- No. of episodes: 14 + special

Release
- Original network: The CW
- Original release: January 21 – June 2, 2020

Season chronology
- ← Previous; Season 4 Next → Season 6

The fifth season of the American television series Legends of Tomorrow, which is based on characters from DC Comics, premiered on The CW on January 21, 2020. It consisted of 14 regular episodes, alongside a special episode for the "Crisis on Infinite Earths" crossover that precedes the season premiere. It is set in the Arrowverse, sharing continuity with the other television series of the universe, and is a spin-off of Arrow and The Flash. The season was produced by Berlanti Productions, Warner Bros. Television, and DC Entertainment, with Phil Klemmer and Keto Shimizu serving as showrunners.

The season was ordered in January 2019. Production began that July, and wrapped in January 2020. Principal cast members Brandon Routh, Caity Lotz, Maisie Richardson-Sellers, Tala Ashe, Jes Macallan, Courtney Ford, Amy Louise Pemberton, Nick Zano, Dominic Purcell and Matt Ryan return from previous seasons, while Olivia Swann was promoted to the main cast from her guest status in season four.

== Episodes ==
Legends of Tomorrow, season 5 episodes
No. overall	No. in season	Title	Directed by	Written by	Original release date	Prod. code	U.S. viewers (millions)
Special
68	–	"Crisis on Infinite Earths: Part Five"	Gregory Smith	Keto Shimizu & Ubah Mohamed	January 14, 2020	T13.21908	1.35
Waking up in the newly recreated universe, the Paragons discover they are the only ones who remember the Crisis and that Earth-38 and Jefferson Pierce's Earth were merged with Earth-1 into a composite universe, later designated as Earth-Prime. Not only that, Oliver Queen's second sacrifice also gave them all fresh starts. While J'onn J'onzz uses his psionic powers to restore their allies' memories, Sara Lance attempts to find Oliver, though without success. Later that night, the Paragons are attacked by shadow demons. A restored and remorseful Nash Wells discovers that the Anti-Monitor is still alive and plotting to renew his destruction of the multiverse. To stop him once and for all, Nash, Ray Palmer, Barry Allen, and Ryan Choi work to develop a bomb to shrink the Anti-Monitor for eternity while the other heroes distract him. Once it is finished, Kara Danvers uses it on the Anti-Monitor and sends him to the microverse. Some time later, Barry, Kara, Sara, J'onn, Jefferson, Kate Kane, and Clark Kent hold a memorial service for Oliver before agreeing to work together to protect their new world in his memory. Note: This episode concludes a crossover event that begins on Supergirl season 5 episode 9, and continues on Batwoman season 1 episode 9, The Flash season 6 episode 9, and Arrow season 8 episode 8.
Season
69	1	"Meet the Legends"	Kevin Mock	Grainne Godfree & James Eagan	January 21, 2020	T13.21901	0.72
Following the events of Hey World and Neron's defeat, the Legends have become public heroes. With the Time Bureau dismantled, Ava Sharpe joins the Legends and allows a documentary crew to film them so they can raise funds. Sara, Ray, and Mick Rory return from dealing with the Crisis, with Sara having yet to come to terms with Oliver's death. (Note: As depicted in "Crisis on Infinite Earths".) Suddenly, a timequake takes place, leading the Legends to 1917 Russia, where Grigori Rasputin has returned from the dead. The Legends fail to convince Rasputin to kill his killer, so they return to the Waverider, but leave a film crew member behind. As a result, the Legends form a plan to stop Rasputin and rescue the crew member before returning to 2020. They then release the documentary to the world, before claiming the film was faked. Meanwhile, in 2020, John Constantine and Gary Green investigate a demon named Masher, who possessed a child in Star City. Constantine performs an exorcism, freeing the child and sending Masher back to Hell. Constantine also returns to Hell, Mick quits writing and passes on his career to Mona Wu, and Nate sees an old message from Zari Tomaz, asking him to find her in the new timeline.
70	2	"Miss Me, Kiss Me, Love Me"	David Geddes	Ray Utarnachitt	February 4, 2020	T13.21902	0.77
The Legends head to 1947 where mobster Bugsy Siegel has been revived, with Mona coining the term "Encore" for these revived individuals. With his new lease on life, Bugsy plans to make it to the top in the world of crime by becoming an information broker. He also gets revenge on his killer, using a gun loaded with hellfire bullets to destroy their body and soul. Meanwhile, Constantine poses as a detective to deal with Bugsy's girlfriend Jeanie, who has been blackmailed and trapped into a relationship with him. With Constantine's aid, she finds the blackmail Bugsy has on others, but Jeanie, intends to use it to gain power, goes back to her car and is killed in an explosion caused by the city's dirty cops. The Legends capture Bugsy, but Constantine uses him to return to Hell. He kills him with his own Hell Gun before warning Astra Logue, the mastermind behind the Encores, to stop. Meanwhile, Nate and Behrad Tarazi return to the latter's home time and town for dinner, where they find Zari has become an internet celebrity with no memory of Nate or her life with the Legends. Nate and Zari almost connect when she realizes that they were both at Hey World decades ago but have not aged a day. She threatens to tell her parents about this but Behrad and Nate take her to the Waverider through a time portal.
71	3	"Slay Anything"	Alexandra La Roche	Matthew Maala & Tyron B. Carter	February 11, 2020	T13.21903	0.74
Ray believes the Encores can be stopped by reforming them in the past. The Legends test this idea when executed serial killer Freddy Meyers is encored in 2004 and attacks his high school reunion. Sara, Ava, and Mick head there to stop him while Ray, Nate, and Behrad take Nora Darhk to 1989 to become Freddy's fairy godmother and fix his prom night. The Legends find evidence of a prank that Freddy's date, Tiffany, and a jock were going to pull, but the former has a change of heart and gets the latter to confess. With Nora's encouragement, Freddy uses his last wish to perform a dance number to show his "true self". Zari has flashes of her life as a hacker and escapes the Waverider just as the real killer attacks the prom. To Freddy's horror, the killer is his overly-possessive mother Kathy, whose crime he took the fall for in the original timeline. Behrad manages to knock her out, undoing her damage and causing her to disappear in 2004 just as she was about to murder Ava and Sarah. The Legends reconvene at the reunion, learning Freddy and Tiffany got married in the repaired timeline. Mick, an alumnus of the same school, reconnects with an old girlfriend, Ali. Meanwhile, Constantine resorts to desperate measures to stop Astra's Encores by facing her mother's ghost, much to Charlie and Gary's dismay.
72	4	"A Head of Her Time"	Avi Youabian	Morgan Faust	February 18, 2020	T13.21904	0.72
Sara leaves Ava in charge of the Legends while she heads to Star City for business. An Encore appears in 1793 France, causing a massacre. The Legends investigate, finding Marie Antoinette, who was encored after her execution. Discovering Marie has magic perfume, the Legends capture her, separating her head from her body. Not understanding how dangerous the perfume is, Zari steals it when Behrad takes her back to 2040 for her own perfume's launch. Behrad, Nate, and Ava go to stop her while Marie's body gets free and steals Mick's Heat Gun. Zari is pushed into a fountain to wash off the perfume and escorted back to the Waverider before she can damage history any further. They return just as Mick and Ray stop Marie's body and lock it in the lab, though Astra recalls her back to Hell. Zari has another flashback of her old life and talks with Ava about life's difficulties, becoming friends. Meanwhile, Constantine is tormented by various ghosts. She reveals that the Loom of Fate is the key and Charlie knows where it is. Charlie reveals she destroyed it, just as Constantine starts coughing up blood.
73	5	"Mortal Khanbat"	Caity Lotz	Grainne Godfree & Mark Bruner	February 25, 2020	T13.21905	0.74
When he is diagnosed with stage 4 lung cancer, Constantine concludes Astra tampered with his soul coin and forces Ray and Gary to help him find a way to extend his life, but to no avail. Poisoning himself, Constantine literally goes to Hell and tells Astra that he promised her mother that he would use the Loom of Fate to save them, so she gives him his remaining years back. Meanwhile, the Legends head to 1990s Hong Kong, where Genghis Khan is attempting to start a new empire by using a hell sword and the contemporary Triads to force Prince Charles to hand over control of the city to him. Using her powers to disguise herself as Prince Charles, Charlie manages to steal Khan's sword and kill him with it. Following this, Charlie reveals to her friends that she is actually Clotho of the Fates and that she scattered the Loom of Fate across the multiverse to give everyone free will. Due to the Crisis however, the pieces are now on Earth-Prime and her sisters are out for revenge against her.
74	6	"Mr. Parker's Cul-De-Sac"	Ben Hernandez Bray	Keto Shimizu & James Eagan	March 10, 2020	T13.21906	0.73
Ray plans a romantic dinner for Nora at Constantine's house, planning to propose to her while Nate and Behrad babysit her latest charge, Pippa, on the Waverider. Unfortunately, her father Damien Darhk is encored following Mallus' demise and steals his Gary's time courier to get to 2020. When Constantine blunders in, Nora tries to pass him off as her lover and her friends as her minions. The ruse fails, forcing Nora to reveal the truth, disappointing Damien. After Pippa wishes everyone into the TV show, Mr Parker's Cul-De-Sac, Nora tells Damien that being a fairy godmother helps her with the trauma of being raised by Mallus' cult instead of him. Damien gives his blessing and everyone is released. Ray and Nora have a makeshift wedding, with Damien advising his new son-in-law that Nora cannot live her life to the fullest as a Legend. He discreetly leaves and kills himself with Khan's blade. Meanwhile, Mick learns someone has libeled his books. With Zari's help, he tracks down a girl named Lita, whom he learns is his and Ali's daughter. Not wishing to taint Lita's life with his presence, Mick erases the visit from everyone's minds.
75	7	"Romeo v Juliet: Dawn of Justness"	Alexandra La Roche	Ray Utarnachitt & Matthew Maala	March 17, 2020	T13.21907	0.67
While in 16th century England to retrieve the first piece of the Loom of Fate, the Legends inadvertently inspire William Shakespeare to rewrite Romeo and Juliet as a superhero story just as he was about to write its ending. Even worse, they fail to wipe his mind correctly following a bar fight. Initially, they decide to let the playwright be as they got what they came for. However, Sara refuses to accept this and forces her team to return and convince Shakespeare to write Romeo and Juliet as intended. After his boss withdraws his actors before a performance, Shakespeare becomes despondent until the Legends offer to fill in for them. Following this, Ray and Nora leave the Legends to live their lives together. Meanwhile, Astra attains a special viewing device to spy on Constantine. However, he quickly catches on and uses a spell to knock her out. When she comes to, she realizes what Constantine is really searching for.
76	8	"Zari, Not Zari"	Kevin Mock	Morgan Faust & Tyron B. Carter	April 21, 2020	T13.21909	0.65
Charlie's sister, Atropos, murders her old band soon after she was recruited by the Legends. Sara, Charlie, and Constantine discover that the second piece of the Loom is hidden in the present day on the set of Supernatural. Before they can find it, Atropos attacks them and takes the second piece of the Loom after seemingly killing Sara. Following this, Atropos sets off to the ship to find the first piece of the Loom. Meanwhile, Zari tries to discover why she is experiencing memories of the previous timeline. While communing with her family's spirits inside the wind totem, she finds her past self and they discuss their different lives; reconciling their differences and granting Zari control of the totem once more. When Atropos enters the Waverider, she kills Behrad, but Sara and Charlie take back the Loom pieces and throw her into the timestream. Elsewhere, Mick wants to improve his relationship with Lita, so he and Ava try to make memorable moments and take photos throughout Lita's life. However, Lita continues to be disappointed and Mick realizes that he needs to be more involved in her life in order to be a good father.
77	9	"The Great British Fake Off"	David A. Geddes	Jackie Canino	April 28, 2020	T13.21910	0.69
Charlie reveals she gave the last Loom fragment to the Enchantress, who made it extremely difficult to find. Constantine tries using everyone's energy to summon the fragment, but Sara faints; forcing him and Zari to travel to 1918 England, where they discover Constantine's house used to be a boarding house. They check-in, only to find several Encores have beaten them there. After disguising themselves as Jack the Ripper and Cleopatra, they discover Charlie's second sister, Lachesis, sent the Encores for the same purpose as them. Though their deception is discovered, Constantine and Zari successfully destroy the Encores, recover their Hell weapons, and get the Ring from the housekeeper; who unbeknownst to Zari, was the Enchantress. Meanwhile, Ava, Gary, and Mick go to Hell to confront Astra and learn why she sent her Encores, only for Astra to discover that Lachesis and Atropos stole her soul coins to get the Loom for themselves, though they offer to give her Charlie's place. Astra accepts to get Constantine's coin back, but secretly joins the Legends to ensure that her fate is changed for the better.
78	10	"Ship Broken"	Andi Armaganian	James Eagan & Mark Bruner	May 5, 2020	T13.21911	0.72
In an effort to bond with Lita, Mick takes her aboard the Waverider for the weekend. Gary also brings his new emotional support dog, Gary Junior, aboard. Charlie tries to use the Loom of Fate to resurrect Behrad, but fails, causing the ship to lose power. Sara wakes up from her coma, only to discover she has gone blind and gained the ability to see near future visions of people's deaths while touching someone. When the Legends learn that the Loom fragments have gone missing and the Waverider was sabotaged, they immediately accuse Astra. However, after hearing a voice telling her to kill Gary, and Zari finds footage of the crew destroying the ship when Junior was nearby, Sara and the others realize that Junior is to blame. Gary reveals that Junior was a "rescue" from Hell, causing Ava to realize that Junior is actually a hellhound named Marchosias. Constantine sends Marchosias back to Hell and Gary recovers the fragments. Ava takes Sara to the medbay to cure her blindness, but Gideon is unable to find anything wrong with her.
79	11	"Freaks and Greeks"	Nico Sachse	Matthew Maala & Ubah Mohamed	May 12, 2020	T13.21912	0.66
The Legends travel to Hudson University, Nate's alma mater, to enter a contest held by the Greek god Dionysus, where the winner will receive an enchanted chalice that will make its drinkers immortal for a day. Sara hopes that by achieving immortality, the Legends will be able to help Charlie use the Loom. While forming a sorority to ensure the Legends' eligibility in the contest, Nate falls under Dionysus' influence as he intends to discourage their efforts and "keep the party going," recalling how the Fates used the Loom to suppress free will. After sabotaging one of Dionysus' parties and winning a game of beer pong using her newfound cognitive ability, Sara gets the chalice and suggests that they all drink from it, to which everyone but Zari agrees. However, Astra is confronted by Lachesis, who has come to collect a favor from her.
80	12	"I Am Legends"	Andrew Kasch	Ray Utarnachitt & Leah Poulliot & Emily Cheever	May 19, 2020	T13.21913	0.80
Astra is forced to leave the Legends behind at Constantine's house and hijack the Waverider so the Fates can use the Loom in exchange for them resurrecting her mother, but Lachesis talks her out of it. Gary, who got stuck onboard the timeship, works with a hallucination of Gideon to keep the Loom fragments away from the Fates. He persuades Astra not to betray the Legends, but before she can get them back, Atropos kills her for betraying the Fates. Meanwhile, the Legends attempt to head to an old Time Bureau safe house in London to get a time courier, but Atropos pursues them and creates a zombie apocalypse in England. The team's immortality ends before they can use the courier and they sacrifice themselves to allow Charlie to escape. She is able to get back onto the Waverider and get the fragments from Gary, but Atropos kills him. With nowhere left to run and no other options, Charlie gives the fragments to her sisters and agrees to help them use the Loom.
81	13	"The One Where We're Trapped on TV"	Marc Guggenheim	Grainne Godfree & James Eagan	May 26, 2020	T13.21914	0.76
In a dystopian world controlled by the Fates, Mona, Gary, and the rest of the populace tune into television shows made by Clotho Productions, starring the Legends. While in the sitcom Ultimate Buds, Zari is possessed by her previous timeline self, who realizes their world is real. Mona and Gary go to Clotho Productions and find their friends trapped in an algorithm and restore their memories, including the previous Zari and Behrad. Charlie reveals she crafted the algorithm for the Legends to live in to keep them safe. After Charlie uses Mr. Parker from Mr. Parker's Cul-de-sac to return the Legends to their shows, they escape by getting their shows cancelled, finding themselves on an empty TV set. Charlie offers to restore the shows and allow both versions of Zari to exist separately to try and control them, but the Legends choose free will and leave the set. Charlie tells Mona and Gary she can no longer protect her friends from her sisters because of their decision.
82	14	"Swan Thong"	Kevin Mock	Keto Shimizu & Morgan Faust	June 2, 2020	T13.21915	0.73
Infiltrating the Fates' temple, Sara kills Atropos by throwing her into the Loom of Fate, destroying it. As a result, Sara loses her powers and regains her sight. Traveling four months into the future, the Legends find Lachesis rebuilt the Loom as a smartwatch app and imprisoned Charlie in The Museum of Bad Ideas, who has been convinced that everything wrong with humanity is her fault. Freeing her and taking her back to the ship, the Legends find that the Loom really is destroyed and Lachesis is using Gideon as a cover. Lita helps Charlie see good can come from chaos and inspires her to join the Legends in shutting down Lachesis' app and killing the final Encores at the museum. Realizing Lachesis is human without the Loom, Charlie forgives her and tells her to live the one life she has. The previous timeline's Zari realizes her presence is slowly killing Behrad, so she returns to the totem. Returning to 1970s London and her band, Charlie also leaves the team. Astra begins her second chance at life by moving in with Constantine and giving him his soul coin back. Unbeknownst to the team, Sara is abducted by aliens.

== Cast and characters ==
=== Main ===
- Brandon Routh as Ray Palmer / Atom (Note: Routh is credited through "Romeo v Juliet: Dawn of Justness". Routh also portrays the Earth-96 Clark Kent / Superman in "Crisis on Infinite Earths: Part Five".)
- Caity Lotz as Sara Lance / White Canary
- Maisie Richardson-Sellers as Charlie / Clotho
- Tala Ashe as Zari Tomaz and Zari Tarazi
- Jes Macallan as Ava Sharpe
- Courtney Ford as Nora Darhk (Note: Ford is credited through "Romeo v Juliet: Dawn of Justness". Ford also portrays Marie Antoinette in "A Head of Her Time" and "Swan Thong".)
- Olivia Swann as Astra Logue
- Amy Louise Pemberton as Gideon
- LaMonica Garrett as Mobius / Anti-Monitor (Note: Garrett is credited in the main cast in his only appearance in "Crisis on Infinite Earths: Part Five".)
- Nick Zano as Nate Heywood / Steel
- Dominic Purcell as Mick Rory / Heat Wave
- Matt Ryan as John Constantine (Note: Despite being considered as part of the main cast, he is credited in the special appearance billing.)

=== Recurring ===
- Ramona Young as Mona Wu
- Adam Tsekhman as Gary Green
- Shayan Sobhian as Behrad Tarazi
- Lisa Marie DiGiacinto as Ali
- Sarah Strange as Lachesis
- Mina Sundwall as Lita
  - Emmerson Sadler as Lita (ages 5 and 7)
  - Scarlett Jando as Lita (ages 8, 9 & 10)
- Joanna Vanderham as Atropos

=== Guest ===
- Sisa Grey as Wolfie
- Michael Eklund as Grigori Rasputin
- Adam Beauchesne as Kevin Harris
- Callum Airlie as Edgar
- Haley Strode as Jeanie Hill
- Jonathan Sadowski as Bugsy Siegel
- David Diaan as Mr. Tarazi
- Clayton Chitty as Sullivan
- Mitra Lohrasb as Nasreen Tarazi
- Beth Riesgraf as Kathy Meyers
- Seth Meriwether as Freddy Meyers (young)
- Alice Hunter as Natalie Logue
- Terry Chen as Genghis Khan
- Robin Atkin Downes as the voice of the Bulldog Cane
- Madeline Hirvonen as Pippa
- Neal McDonough as Damien Darhk
- Rowan Schlosberg as William Shakespeare
- Jack Gillett as Declan
- Timothy Lyle as Jack the Ripper / Dr. White
- Ben Sullivan as Clyde Barrow
- Abby Ross as Bonnie Parker
- Marion Eisman as Mrs. Hughes
- Drew Tanner as Dionysus / Dion
- Sisqó as Sisqó Animatronic

==== "Crisis on Infinite Earths" ====
- Jon Cryer as Lex Luthor (Earth-38)
- Grant Gustin as Barry Allen / Flash
- Rick Gonzalez as Rene Ramirez / Wild Dog
- Juliana Harkavy as Dinah Drake
- Cress Williams as Jefferson Pierce / Black Lightning
- David Ramsey as John Diggle / Spartan
- Tom Cavanagh as Nash Wells
- Danielle Panabaker as Caitlin Snow and Frost
- Chyler Leigh as Alex Danvers
- David Harewood as J'onn J'onzz / Martian Manhunter
- Nicole Maines as Nia Nal / Dreamer
- Tyler Hoechlin as Clark Kent / Superman
- Elizabeth Tulloch as Lois Lane
- Ruby Rose as Kate Kane / Batwoman
- Melissa Benoist as Kara Danvers / Supergirl
- Osric Chau as Ryan Choi
- Reina Hardesty as Joss Jackam / Weather Witch
- Audrey Marie Anderson as Lyla Michaels
- Eileen Pedde as the President
- Stephen Amell as the voice of Oliver Queen
- Marv Wolfman as himself

== Production ==
=== Development ===
On January 31, 2019, The CW renewed the series for a fifth season. Phil Klemmer and Keto Shimizu serve as the season's showrunners.

=== Writing ===
The fourth season ended with Astra Logue restoring many notorious historical figures like Genghis Khan, Joseph Stalin and Charles Manson to life. Klemmer said these characters would be called "Encores" and have the villain of the week treatment, while the Big Bad of the season would not be demon-related, later revealed to be Lachesis and Atropos of the three Fates. He explained this was done with the intention of returning to the series' roots, of being rooted "more firmly in history and historical periods and figures and true villains". Klemmer added that the season would explore what Zari Tomaz would look like if she "lived a more charmed life" and did not come from a "dystopian, authoritarian future". The season also explores Zari's relationship with her brother Behrad Tarazi. Following the season four finale, the Time Bureau was shut down and its former director Ava Sharpe was left unemployed. The fifth season sees Ava living on the Waverider with her girlfriend Sara Lance, trying to figure out how she fits on the team. It continues to grow the "Avalance" relationship, and also features Sara developing the power of precognition.

=== Casting ===
Main cast members Brandon Routh, Caity Lotz, Maisie Richardson-Sellers, Tala Ashe, Jes Macallan, Amy Louise Pemberton, Courtney Ford, Nick Zano, Dominic Purcell and Matt Ryan return as Ray Palmer, Sara Lance, Charlie, Zari Tomaz, Ava Sharpe, Gideon, Nora Darhk, Nate Heywood, Mick Rory, and John Constantine respectively. This is the final season for Routh, Ford and Richardson-Sellers, with the episode "Romeo v Juliet: Dawn of Justness" marking Routh and Ford's final appearance as series regulars, while Richardson-Sellers departed after the season finale. Olivia Swann, who guest starred as Astra Logue in the fourth season, was promoted to the main cast for the fifth season. Ramona Young, who starred as Mona Wu in the fourth season, returned as a recurring guest star. Tala Ashe, who portrayed Zari Tomaz in seasons three and four, returned this season as Zari Tarazi, a new version of the character from an altered timeline while Zari Tomaz returned in a reduced capacity.

=== Filming ===
Filming began on July 15, 2019. The fifth episode of the season, "Mortal Khanbat", marks Lotz's directorial debut. Filming wrapped in January 2020. Although the "Crisis on Infinite Earths" episode was the eighth episode filmed, the events of the episode occur before the rest of the season.

=== Arrowverse tie-ins ===
In December 2018, during the end of the annual Arrowverse crossover "Elseworlds", a follow-up crossover was announced titled "Crisis on Infinite Earths" based on the comic book series of the same name. The crossover features Tyler Hoechlin reprising his role as the Earth-38 Clark Kent / Superman from Supergirl, while Routh portrays another version of Superman. It took place over five episodes–three in December 2019 and two in January 2020, with Legends of Tomorrow's episode concluding the crossover. The Legends of Tomorrow episode is considered a special episode and not the first episode of the fifth season.

== Release ==
=== Broadcast ===
The season premiered on The CW on January 21, 2020. The season ran for 15 episodes, which included the special episode produced for the "Crisis on Infinite Earths" crossover before the season premiere.

=== Marketing ===
The first official trailer for the season was released on December 5, 2019.

== Reception ==
=== Ratings ===
Viewership and ratings per episode of Legends of Tomorrow season 5
No.	Title	Air date	Rating/share (18–49)	Viewers (millions)	DVR (18–49)	DVR viewers (millions)	Total (18–49)	Total viewers (millions)
–	"Crisis on Infinite Earths: Part Five"	January 14, 2020	0.5/3	1.35	0.4	1.03	0.9	2.38
1	"Meet the Legends"	January 21, 2020	0.2/1	0.72	0.3	0.66	0.5	1.37
2	"Miss Me, Kiss Me, Love Me"	February 4, 2020	0.2	0.79	0.2	0.54	0.4	1.33
3	"Slay Anything"	February 11, 2020	0.2	0.74	0.2	0.58	0.4	1.32
4	"A Head of Her Time"	February 18, 2020	0.2	0.72	0.2	0.52	0.4	1.24
5	"Mortal Khanbat"	February 25, 2020	0.2	0.74	0.2	0.56	0.4	1.30
6	"Mr. Parker's Cul-De-Sac"	March 10, 2020	0.2	0.73	0.2	0.57	0.4	1.30
7	"Romeo V. Juliet: Dawn of Justness"	March 17, 2020	0.2	0.67	0.2	0.56	0.4	1.23
8	"Zari, Not Zari"	April 21, 2020	0.2	0.65	0.2	0.54	0.4	1.19
9	"The Great British Fake Off"	April 28, 2020	0.2	0.69	0.2	0.58	0.4	1.27
10	"Ship Broken"	May 5, 2020	0.2	0.72	0.2	0.55	0.4	1.27
11	"Freaks and Greeks"	May 12, 2020	0.2	0.66	0.2	0.45	0.4	1.11
12	"I Am Legends"	May 19, 2020	0.2	0.80	0.2	0.42	0.4	1.22
13	"The One Where We're Trapped On TV"	May 26, 2020	0.2	0.76	0.2	0.54	0.4	1.30
14	"Swan Thong"	June 2, 2020	0.2	0.73	0.2	0.53	0.4	1.26
