= Legends of Tomorrow season 4 =

Legends of Tomorrow
- Season 4
- Home media cover
- Starring: Brandon Routh; Caity Lotz; Maisie Richardson-Sellers; Tala Ashe; Jes Macallan; Courtney Ford; Amy Louise Pemberton; Ramona Young; Nick Zano; Dominic Purcell; Matt Ryan
- No. of episodes: 16

Release
- Original network: The CW
- Original release: October 22, 2018 – May 20, 2019

Season chronology
- ← Previous; Season 3 Next → Season 5

The fourth season of the American television series Legends of Tomorrow, which is based on characters from DC Comics, premiered on The CW on October 22, 2018, and concluded on May 20, 2019, with a total of 16 episodes. The season follows the Legends, a dysfunctional team of time-traveling superheroes and anti-heroes, and their mission to recapture the magical fugitives that they accidentally released throughout time. It is set in the Arrowverse, sharing continuity with the other television series of the universe, and is a spin-off of Arrow and The Flash. The season was produced by Berlanti Productions, Warner Bros. Television, and DC Entertainment, with Phil Klemmer and Keto Shimizu serving as showrunners.

The season was ordered in April 2018, and production began that July. Principal cast members Brandon Routh, Caity Lotz, Maisie Richardson-Sellers, Tala Ashe, Amy Louise Pemberton, Nick Zano, and Dominic Purcell return from previous seasons, while Jes Macallan, Matt Ryan and Courtney Ford were promoted to the principal cast from their recurring statuses in season three. They are joined by new cast member Ramona Young. The series was renewed for a fifth season on January 31, 2019.

== Episodes ==
Season four episodes
No. overall	No. in season	Title	Directed by	Written by	Original release date	Prod. code	U.S. viewers (millions)
52	1	"The Virgin Gary"	Gregory Smith	Phil Klemmer & Grainne Godfree	October 22, 2018	T13.21051	1.00
The Legends and the Time Bureau celebrate a job well done, while Zari chastises Ray for allowing Nora Darhk to escape. Ava and Sara rekindle their relationship. Constantine tries to warn Sara about the darkness coming, but Sara dismisses him. The Legends end up at Woodstock, where they see a unicorn impale a woman and eat her heart. It then releases magical goo at every Legend minus Sara, making them hallucinate. Realizing he was right, Sara locates Constantine and informs him of the situation. Constantine cures the affected Legends and sends the unicorn to Hell with a spell, using Gary, who loses a nipple in the process, as bait. Meanwhile, Nate and Rory go on an adventure, leading to Nate attempting to reconnect with his distant father Hank. Back at his accommodations, Constantine experiences a dark form of magic throwing him about the place before it writes in blood that it is coming for him.
53	2	"Witch Hunt"	Kevin Mock	Keto Shimizu & Matthew Maala	October 29, 2018	T13.21052	0.94
The Legends wire up the magical detection bones into the Waverider to allow them to track magical fugitives. Constantine joins the Legends as a magical consultant, with their first mission leading them to the Salem Witch Trials. When an innocent woman is accused of witchcraft, her daughter's Fairy Godmother attacks the townsfolk. Zari fights to save the mother, who was executed in the original timeline, while Constantine and the Legends try to separate the daughter and the Fairy Godmother so Constantine can banish her to Hell. However, the Fairy Godmother turns Ray and Mick into pigs and seals Constantine's mouth shut but, when the daughter releases her, the Legends return to normal. Constantine offers the Fairy Godmother the chance to avoid Hell by becoming her new magical conduit, but she refuses, stating that she knows who is after Constantine and would rather go to Hell than anger him. Nate discovers his father is overseeing the committee that funds the Time Bureau and struggles to prove that magic is real to keep the Bureau funded. He is able to do so when Ray turns back to normal in his arms. Ava offers Nate a place at the Bureau and he accepts.
54	3	"Dancing Queen"	Kristin Windell	James Eagan & Morgan Faust	November 5, 2018	T13.21053	0.86
The team tracks another magical fugitive to London, where a new punk rock band called "The Smell" is favored by the Queen. Constantine hypothesizes that the fugitive is a leprechaun and is posing as a member of the band. The team attempts to scope out the band, with Ray earning their trust by stealing one of the Queen's prized corgis, and discovers that, instead of a leprechaun, the fugitive turns out to be a shapeshifter and the band's lead singer, Charlie. Fearing imprisonment, Charlie knocks Ray unconscious (despite him preparing to defend her) and steals his A.T.O.M. suit, using it to try and kill Sara, Zari, Mick, and Constantine when they attempt to catch her and banish her to Hell. Eventually, Ray wakes up and saves the group by deactivating his suit via voice command, leading to Charlie's capture. However as Constantine attempts to banish her, she shapeshifts to resemble each of them, ending with Amaya; she calls them out for not acting like heroes, instilling a sense of sympathy in Zari. Out of annoyance, Constantine casts a spell that renders Charlie unable to shapeshift ever again, leaving her trapped in Amaya's form. They decide to keep her as prisoner on board the Waverider.
55	4	"Wet Hot American Bummer"	David Geddes	Ray Utarnachitt & Tyron B. Carter	November 12, 2018	T13.21054	0.90
Ava briefly joins the team to help with an investigation into kids disappearing at a summer camp in 1995. The team poses as camp counselors while they track down a swamp creature that has been kidnapping the kids. Ava and Sara take a potion that turns them into children in an attempt to lure out the creature. Charlie attempts to escape the Waverider, but is stopped and comforted by Mick. The team is able to locate the monster, known as a Shtriga, and its victims. John uses a spell to banish the Shtriga, but one of the kids remains unresponsive. John uses another spell to give some of his own life force to the child, healing and reviving the child but leaving John close to death. Ray and John are subsequently rescued by the campers. Charlie agrees to help the Legends, officially joining the team, on the condition that they do not lock her up again. Gideon cannot save Constantine, but Ray claims to know someone who might. Nora Darhk is revealed to be working at a Renaissance Faire.
56	5	"Tagumo Attacks!!!"	Alexandra La Roche	Keto Shimizu & Ubah Mohamed	November 19, 2018	T13.21055	0.91
With Constantine still at death's door, Sara has Gideon look for Nora Darhk in 2018, with Gideon quickly finding a match. Ray goes to find her at a Renaissance Faire to ask for her help in saving Constantine. Nora agrees and is able to use her magic to heal him. Ray tells her to run and not to tell them where she went, but Nora uses the time stone to travel to the Time Bureau, wishing to repent for her actions. The other Legends, meanwhile, investigate a fugitive in 1950s Tokyo, discovered to be a giant octopus creature that has appeared on a film set. The creature, Tagumo, was brought to life by a magical book which used the imagination of filmmaker Ishirō Honda. Sara and Charlie manage to partially shrink it, but Tagumo still attacks the set. Mick uses the book and his own imagination to create a heroine named Garima that battles Tagumo, eventually defeating it. The Legends confiscate the book. The fugitives almost escape the Bureau, but Nate and Gary manage to find a way to contain them with food. Ava joins the Heywood family for Thanksgiving. In secret, Hank tells someone the fugitives are controllable and gives them permission to execute "Project Hades."
57	6	"Tender Is the Nate"	Dean Choe	Phil Klemmer & Matthew Maala	November 26, 2018	T13.21056	0.97
Nate invites Hank to the Waverider and gives him a tour of the ship. The Legends attempt to keep Nate from Charlie, because she looks like Amaya, but fail. The Waverider detects a fugitive in Paris, 1927. Ray visits the Bureau in an attempt to see Nora, but Ava rejects the visitation, although Time Bureau employee Mona sneaks in a letter to Nora from Ray. Nora refuses to read the letter and triggers her cell alarm. This grabs Ava's attention, who tries to restrain Nora, but they end up getting locked in the prison cell. The Legends are joined by Ernest Hemingway to hunt for the fugitive, who appears to be a Minotaur. During the fight with the Minotaur, Hank is injured. Nate and Constantine calm the Minotaur down, but Hemingway attacks it, angering the Minotaur. Nate confronts the Minotaur, who bypasses his Steel powers. Hank picks up a guitar and sings the Minotaur to sleep. Meanwhile, Ray rescues Mona, Ava, and Nora. Ava sees humanity in the prisoners, thanks to Mona. Nate officially leaves the Legends team.
58	7	"Hell No, Dolly!"	April Mullen	Grainne Godfree & Morgan Faust	December 3, 2018	T13.21057	0.93
The Legends travel to New Orleans in 1856 to track down a fugitive related to a series of murders. Sara, Ava, Ray, and Mick head off to find the fugitive, while John, Zari, and Charlie scope out the local area. Constantine has a history with the city, where his former lover Desmond made a deal with the demon Neron to protect him and was subsequently sentenced to Hell. The team manages to hunt down the serial killer Mike the Spike, but his consciousness is transferred into the Martin Stein puppet, which stalks the team. Meanwhile, a group of unidentified men attempt to kidnap a Kaupe creature named Konane from the Time Bureau. Mona interferes and helps Konane escape, but is scratched by him in the process. Constantine travels back to 2018 and changes history so that Desmond does not fall in love with him, but this causes a time wave, freezing the Legends aboard the Waverider, breaking the lock on Charlie's shapeshifting abilities, and transforming Zari into a cat.
59	8	"Legends of To-Meow-Meow"	Ben Bray	James Eagan & Ray Utarnachitt	December 10, 2018	T13.21058	1.10
In the new timeline, Constantine never joins the Legends and, as a result, Sara is killed by the unicorn at Woodstock, leading to Mick, Nate, and Ray forming a new, violent version of the Legends called "Custodians of the Chronology." Charlie breaks Constantine out of the Time Bureau and together they return to Woodstock and kill the unicorn. Upon returning to 2018, they discover that Mick, Nate, and Ray have been killed by the Fairy Godmother, while Sara, Ava, and Gideon have formed "Sirens of Space-Time." Another attempt to fix this sees Mick bond with the Fairy Godmother to begin a new criminal career while Sara, Ray, and Nate are now the "Puppets of Tomorrow." After several more failed attempts to fix the timeline result in various other Legends or their allies being killed in increasingly bizarre ways, the restored Zari convinces Constantine to return to New Orleans and restore the original timeline with Desmond. Constantine tells his story to Sara, who agrees to help him battle Neron. Hank is shown golfing with a creature wearing Desmond's face.
60	9	"Lucha de Apuestas"	Andrew Kasch	Keto Shimizu & Tyron B. Carter	April 1, 2019	T13.21059	0.92
Mona is blamed for Konane's escape and fired from the Time Bureau. She evades a mindwiping, meets Konane, and sends him back in time to before he was captured by the Legends. Nate and Zari look into the footage of Konane's escape and find it has been altered by Hank. They recover the original footage from Hank's phone, confirming Mona's version of events. Nate confronts his father, pretending to be on his side. Meanwhile, the rest of the Legends find Konane in 1961 Mexico City working as a professional wrestler named "El Lobo," having overshadowed another wrestler named "El Cura." In order to preserve the timeline, they plan to have El Lobo lose to El Cura in a Lucha de Apuestas. Sara confronts Ava about Nate and Zari's suspicions, but she does not believe her and has her team go after Konane. In 1961, El Cura reclaims his old glory by helping the Legends stop the Time Bureau from capturing Konane. Ava breaks up with Sara. Mona is preparing to send Konane back to his time when a Time Bureau agent finds them and shoots Konane dead. An enraged Mona turns into a Kaupe and kills the agent before turning back into a human.
61	10	"The Getaway"	Viet Nguyen	Matthew Maala & Ubah Mohamed	April 8, 2019	T13.21060	0.95
With Ava on leave, Hank assumes Time Bureau directorship and tries to apprehend the Legends. Nate and Zari feign working with him, but secretly help the Legends escape. In 1973, the Legends, while on the run with Mona, remove a roach, an agent of Ma'at, from Richard Nixon that has left him unable to lie. The roach enters Sara, who blames her breakup with Ava on Mona, causing her to run away. Sara and Constantine follow her and, after a battle with her "Wolfie" form, calm her down, making her part of the Legends. Meanwhile, Gary and Nora are brought in on Nate and Zari's conspiracy. They hack Hank's email, but are interrupted by "Desmond," who informs Hank. Hank realizes Nate has deceived him and uses him to capture the rest of the Legends. The roach enters Nate, who confronts Hank about his feelings, leading to Hank promising to trust the Legends henceforth. At the Bureau, Hank attempts to sever ties with "Desmond," who responds by killing him. In her cell, Nora senses the danger, breaks out, and rushes to Hank. Nate enters the room, finding Nora kneeling over his dead father. She tries to explain herself before using her powers to escape.
62	11	"Séance and Sensibility"	Alexandra La Roche	Grainne Godfree & Jackie Canino	April 15, 2019	T13.21061	0.98
The Legends are at Hank's wake when they get an alert that a magical creature has gone after Jane Austen. The women travel to 1802 and attend a wedding where everyone goes crazy with lust. Zari captures Sanjay, who can cause love and lust with Hindu god Kamadeva's ashes, but fails to fix the anachronism. Ray hides Nora onboard the Waverider after she proclaims her innocence in Hank's death. Sanjay uses the ashes to give the Waverider crew intimate dreams. Mona dreams about Konane and gets into a fight with Zari over their differing views on romance. She turns into Wolfie and goes after Austen for making her a romantic, while Zari takes another dose of Sanjay's ashes and captivates Charlie and Sara. Austen talks Mona out of losing control and she rushes to stop Zari from marrying Sanjay. Meanwhile, at the wake, Nate is initially upset with his father and plans to expose him, but later discovers that he was not torturing the magical creatures, but was training them for a theme park Nate had drawn when he was nine. Constantine senses Hank's spirit and pulls it into Mick's body. Hank tells Constantine he has been working with Neron, who then appears, taunting Constantine.
63	12	"The Eggplant, the Witch & the Wardrobe"	Mairzee Almas	Morgan Faust & Daphne Miles	April 22, 2019	T13.21062	0.85
Nate and Ray locate Hank's theme park construction site. Initially wanting the site torn down, Nate eventually changes his mind and has construction continue. The rest of the team discovers Ava has been abducted by Neron. Using Nora's connection to the demon, they track Ava and find her unresponsive. Constantine believes Neron is preparing Ava as his new vessel and agrees to send Sara to reclaim her soul from her personal Purgatory, which takes the form of a supermarket with Ava products. Ava and Sara solve their relationship issues and find a way out. Meanwhile, Charlie, Constantine, and Nora ambush Neron and capture him. Neron tempts Nora with reviving her father if she agrees to become his new vessel, while also revealing he needs a second vessel for someone called Tabitha. Nora seemingly agrees but, when Neron leaves Desmond's body, he is trapped by Nora and Constantine. However, Constantine loses focus when a concerned Ray rushes to the scene, leading to Neron and Nora zapping each other before the former disappears, leaving the latter unresponsive. Desmond wakes up, but leaves Constantine, upset about being sent to Hell. While Constantine believes Neron is dead, the demon is actually now inside Ray.
64	13	"Egg MacGuffin"	Chris Tammaro	James Eagan & Tyron B. Carter	April 29, 2019	T13.21063	0.91
Sara tries to get Nate and Zari romantically involved by having them go after a fugitive in 1933. They infiltrate the Adventurers' Society, where Gordon Gilchrist reveals his discovery of a golden egg. After Nazis show up looking for the egg, Ava and Sara join the mission, capture the egg, and bring it onboard the Waverider, where it is revealed as a dragon egg. Meanwhile, Ray discovers Neron is inside him and tries to resist his control. Neron looks to seal the possession by having Ray murder a loved one, first targeting Nora and then Nate. Constantine uses a spell to awaken Nora, who reveals that Neron controls Ray. Neron gains full control of Ray when he offers to stop resisting to save Nate's life. Gary, feeling unappreciated by both the Legends and the Time Bureau, accepts his nipple back from Neron and falls under his control. He and Ray teleport away, taking Constantine with them. Ava recruits Nora as part of the Time Bureau to help take down Neron.
65	14	"Nip/Stuck"	David A. Geddes	Ray Utarnachitt & Matthew Maala	May 6, 2019	T13.21064	0.94
Neron threatens to kill Ray unless Constantine opens a portal to hell for Tabitha. The Legends track Constantine to the ice age, but are trapped in an avalanche, while Neron and Constantine relocate to 55 BC Stonehenge to meet John's ancestor King Kon-sten-tyn, a mage responsible for the rift between humans and magical creatures. Constantine confronts his ancestor for threatening to send an innocent Púca to Hell and tries to enlist his help against Neron, but the king has him apprehended for practicing dark arts. The king opens a portal to Hell, which Constantine stabilizes to save the Púca. The Legends work together to break free from the ice and travel to Stonehenge in time to stop Constantine from killing Neron and condemning Ray to an eternity in Hell. Constantine decides to save Ray and enters the portal, which Neron then uses to bring out Tabitha, revealed as the Fairy Godmother. Meanwhile, Gary uses his nipple's hypnotizing powers to take over the Time Bureau. Mona turns into Wolfie and bites the nipple off before Neron and Tabitha arrive. Tabitha turns Wolfie back into Mona, whom she, Neron, and Gary then kidnap. Nora chases after them while Ava alerts the Legends.
66	15	"Terms of Service"	April Mullen	Grainne Godfree & Ubah Mohamed	May 13, 2019	T13.21065	0.99
The Legends' attempt to reclaim the Time Bureau is interrupted when Tabitha begins granting Gary's wishes, occupying Ava, Mick, Nate, and Sara. Neron launches a phone app to track magical creatures, using Mona to publicly prove their existence. Charlie and Zari discover that anyone who downloads the app surrenders their soul to Neron. After regrouping at Zari's childhood home, they infiltrate the Time Bureau to save the magical creatures that Neron plans to use to create buzz for his app. The creatures are saved, but Charlie is captured. Tabitha is freed from having to obey Gary when she tricks Nora into becoming the new fairy godmother. Gary accepts the Legends' apologies and sends his fairy godmother, not realizing it is now Nora, to Hell to save Constantine and Ray. Meanwhile, Constantine discovers Neron is attempting to take over Hell. He seeks out the Triumvirate and offers to stop Neron from usurping them in exchange for the souls of Astra and Ray. Having to choose between the two, Constantine chooses Astra. However, Astra, having grown up in Hell, turns him down and leaves him to be tortured. Meanwhile, the dragon egg, accidentally left in Zari's home, hatches in young Zari's possession.
67	16	"Hey, World!"	Kevin Mock	Phil Klemmer & Keto Shimizu	May 20, 2019	T13.21066	1.05
Neron and Tabitha cause mass panic by turning Charlie into Tagumo in public. The Legends save Charlie, who reveals that Neron wants to unleash Hell on Earth by opening a portal powered by fear. Meanwhile, Nora saves Constantine and they recover Ray's soul from the "Soul Exchange" with Astra's help. They return to Earth, but Ray is stuck until Neron leaves his body. Seeing how popular her dragon has made young Zari inspires the Legends to open Heyworld, Hank's theme park. Neron and Tabitha crash the opening and, when Tabitha is eaten by Zari's dragon, Neron uses the crowd's fear to open the portal. Constantine and Nate trick Neron into killing Nate, therefore breaking his word to Ray. Neron is ejected from Ray's body and killed by Constantine, who then closes the portal and revives Ray. Nate reunites with his father in the afterlife before being revived with Tabitha's staff, powered by love. By teaching tolerance, the Legends erase the dystopian 2042 from history, resulting in Zari being replaced by her previously dead brother Behrad with only Nate sensing that something has changed. In hell, Astra offers the 16 evil souls that she secretly stole from the Soul Exchange a second chance.

== Cast and characters ==
=== Main ===
- Brandon Routh as Ray Palmer / Atom and Neron (Note: Routh plays Neron from "Egg MacGuffin" onward.)
- Caity Lotz as Sara Lance / White Canary
- Maisie Richardson-Sellers as Charlie (Note: Richardson-Sellers is first credited in the main cast in "Wet Hot American Bummer" after previously making a guest appearance in "Dancing Queen".)
- Tala Ashe as Zari Tomaz
- Jes Macallan as Ava Sharpe
- Courtney Ford as Nora Darhk (Note: Ford is first credited in the main cast in "Wet Hot American Bummer" after previously making a guest appearance in "The Virgin Gary".)
- Amy Louise Pemberton as Gideon
- Ramona Young as Mona Wu (Note: Young is first credited in "Dancing Queen.")
- Nick Zano as Nate Heywood / Steel
- Dominic Purcell as Mick Rory / Heat Wave
- Matt Ryan as John Constantine (Note: Ryan is listed among the main cast in season four but credited in the opening titles as special appearance. Ryan also portrays King Kon-sten-tyn.)

=== Recurring ===
- Adam Tsekhman as Gary Green
- Tom Wilson as Hank Heywood
- Susan Hogan as Dorothy Heywood
- Jane Carr as Fairy Godmother / Tabitha
- Christian Keyes as Desmond and Neron
- Darien Martin as Konane
- Paul Reubens as Mike the Spike
- Sisa Grey as Wolfie

=== Guest ===
- Laura Regan as Jane Hawthorne
- Jordyn Ashley Olson as Prudence Hawthorne
- Gerard Plunkett as Reverend Parsons
- Anjli Mohindra as Charlie
- Jack Gillett as Declan
- Emily Murden as child Sara
- Vanessa Przada as child Ava
- Mason Trueblood as Chad Stephens
- Eijiro Ozaki as Ishirō Honda
- Andrew Lees as Ernest Hemingway
- Jason McKinnon as F. Scott Fitzgerald
- Meganne Young as Zelda Fitzgerald
- Joyce Guy as Marie Laveau
- Frank Gallegos as El Cura
- Paul Ganus as Richard Nixon
- Sachin Bhatt as Sanjay
- Jenna Rosenow as Jane Austen
- Jason Schombing as Mikey T.
- John Murphy as Gordon Gilchrist
- Amitai Marmorstein as Vincent
- Olivia Swann as Astra Logue
- Gracelyn Awad Rinke as young Zari
- Shayan Sobhian as Behrad Tarazi
- Casper Crump as Vandal Savage
- LaMonica Garrett as Mar Novu / The Monitor

== Production ==
=== Development ===
At the Television Critics Association winter press tour in January 2018, The CW president Mark Pedowitz said he was "optimistic" and "confident" about Arrow and the other Arrowverse shows returning next season, but added that it was too soon to announce anything just yet. On April 2, The CW renewed the series for its fourth season. Marc Guggenheim stepped down as co-showrunner at the end of the third season, with co-showrunner Phil Klemmer originally set to emerge as sole showrunner for the fourth season. However, Keto Shimizu ultimately replaced Guggenheim as co-showrunner, to serve alongside Klemmer for this season. Guggenheim, the series' co-developer along with Klemmer, remained involved as an executive consultant.

=== Writing ===
Phil Klemmer said that Mallus, the Big Bad of the third season, was "a sort of bellwether of bad guys to come in Season 4", which he said would go deep into the "world of fantastic myths and monsters", without abandoning the time travel nature of the series. He also said the season would further explore the Time Bureau, which was introduced in season three. Klemmer added that at least one of the Legends would "break bad" in the season. Tala Ashe, who joined the series as Zari Tomaz during the third season, said the fourth season would further explore the character's backstory, in addition to the prejudice and xenophobia experienced by her. Courtney Ford, who recurred in the third season as Damien Darhk's daughter Nora, hoped the fourth season would explore what the character is without the influence of her father and Mallus. Klemmer compared Neron, the season's Big Bad, to technology entrepreneur Elon Musk, calling him a "disruptor" in Hell, similar to how Musk affected transportation with Tesla electric cars. Originally, the character of Hank Heywood was designed as the Big Bad of the season, however, when the writers saw Tom Wilson's performance and got to know him as a person, the character was rewritten as more sympathetic and likable. The original plan of turning Nate Heywood into a more sinister character because of his father was also abandoned in favor of a plotline where Hank is turned instead.

=== Casting ===
Main cast members Brandon Routh, Caity Lotz, Amy Louise Pemberton, Dominic Purcell, Nick Zano, and Tala Ashe return from previous seasons as Ray Palmer / Atom, Sara Lance / White Canary, Gideon, Mick Rory / Heat Wave, Nate Heywood / Steel, and Zari Tomaz, respectively. Maisie Richardson-Sellers, who played Amaya Jiwe / Vixen in seasons two and three, also returned as a series regular, portraying a new character named Charlie, one of the season's magical fugitives. While Sellers spoke with an American accent when playing Amaya, she speaks with her native British accent when playing Charlie. In July 2018, Ramona Young was added to the main cast as Alaska Yu, though her character was ultimately named Mona Wu. Matt Ryan, Jes Macallan and Courtney Ford, who recurred in the third season as John Constantine, Ava Sharpe and Nora Darhk respectively, were promoted to regular status for the fourth season.

Keiynan Lonsdale, who portrayed Wally West / Kid Flash as a regular in the latter half of the third season, did not return in the same capacity for the fourth season. He cited his reason being his desire to seek other acting opportunities. This is the first season not to feature Arthur Darvill, who starred as Rip Hunter in the first two seasons, and recurred in the third season. It is also the first not to feature Victor Garber and Franz Drameh, who starred as Martin Stein and Jefferson Jackson respectively, in the previous seasons. This was the last season where Tala Ashe portrayed Zari Tomaz as a main character. She would return in a reduced capacity in future seasons while a new version of Zari from an altered timeline was introduced in the fifth season.

=== Filming ===
Production for the season began on July 5, 2018, in Vancouver, and concluded on January 25, 2019.

=== Music ===
On April 16, 2019, WaterTower Music released "I Surrender", a single from the episode "Séance and Sensibility" for free. The single was performed by actors Tala Ashe, Sachin Bhatt, Ramona Young, Brandon Routh, Courtney Ford, Caity Lotz, and Maisie Richardson-Sellers.

== Marketing ==
The main cast of the season as well as Phil Klemmer attended San Diego Comic-Con on July 21, 2018, to promote the season. On October 15, 2018, Routh released a mock political ad on his Twitter page, voiced by Zano. The ad jokingly claimed that Arrow, The Flash, and Supergirl were trying to keep attention away from Legends of Tomorrow, followed by many headlines as well as real and fake quotes praising the series.

== Release ==
=== Broadcast ===
On June 20, 2018, The CW released its fall schedule, revealing that the series would move from the 8:00 pm Monday time-slot to the 9:00 pm time-slot, to serve as the lead-out to Arrow. The season began airing in the United States on The CW on October 22, 2018.

=== Home media ===
The season was made available for streaming on Netflix in late May 2019.

== Reception ==
=== Ratings ===
Viewership and ratings per episode of Legends of Tomorrow season 4
No.	Title	Air date	Rating/share (18–49)	Viewers (millions)	DVR (18–49)	DVR viewers (millions)	Total (18–49)	Total viewers (millions)
1	"The Virgin Gary"	October 22, 2018	0.3/1	1.00	0.4	1.03	0.7	2.03
2	"Witch Hunt"	October 29, 2018	0.3/1	0.94	0.3	0.88	0.6	1.82
3	"Dancing Queen"	November 5, 2018	0.3/1	0.86	0.3	0.93	0.6	1.79
4	"Wet Hot American Bummer"	November 12, 2018	0.3/1	0.90	0.3	0.75	0.6	1.65
5	"Tagumo Attacks!!!"	November 19, 2018	0.3/1	0.91	0.3	0.84	0.6	1.75
6	"Tender Is the Nate"	November 26, 2018	0.3/1	0.97	0.3	0.79	0.6	1.76
7	"Hell No, Dolly!"	December 3, 2018	0.3/1	0.93	0.3	0.85	0.6	1.78
8	"Legends of To-Meow-Meow"	December 10, 2018	0.4/2	1.10	0.3	0.74	0.7	1.84
9	"Lucha de Apuestas"	April 1, 2019	0.2/1	0.92	0.3	0.74	0.5	1.66
10	"The Getaway"	April 8, 2019	0.3/1	0.95	0.2	0.62	0.5	1.57
11	"Séance and Sensibility"	April 15, 2019	0.3/1	0.98	0.2	0.59	0.5	1.57
12	"The Eggplant, the Witch & the Wardrobe"	April 22, 2019	0.2/1	0.85	0.3	0.63	0.5	1.48
13	"Egg MacGuffin"	April 29, 2019	0.3/2	0.91	0.2	0.59	0.5	1.48
14	"Nip/Stuck"	May 6, 2019	0.3/1	0.94	0.2	0.57	0.5	1.51
15	"Terms of Service"	May 13, 2019	0.3/1	0.99	0.2	0.55	0.5	1.54
16	"Hey, World!"	May 20, 2019	0.3/1	1.05	0.2	0.51	0.5	1.56

=== Critical response ===
The review aggregation website Rotten Tomatoes reports a 98% approval rating for the fourth season, with an average rating of 7.99/10 based on 107 reviews.

=== Accolades ===
Award nominations for Legends of Tomorrow, season 4
Year	Award	Category	Nominee(s)	Result	Ref.
2019	Teen Choice Awards	Choice TV Show: Action	Legends of Tomorrow	Nominated	
2019	Teen Choice Awards	Choice TV Actor: Action	Brandon Routh	Nominated	
