= Legends of Tomorrow season 6 =

Legends of Tomorrow
- Season 6
- Home media cover
- Starring: Caity Lotz; Tala Ashe; Jes Macallan; Olivia Swann; Adam Tsekhman; Shayan Sobhian; Lisseth Chavez; Amy Pemberton; Nick Zano; Dominic Purcell; Matt Ryan
- No. of episodes: 15

Release
- Original network: The CW
- Original release: May 2 – September 5, 2021

Season chronology
- ← Previous; Season 5 Next → Season 7

The sixth season of the American television series Legends of Tomorrow, which is based on characters from DC Comics, premiered on The CW on May 2, 2021, and consisted of 15 episodes. It is set in the Arrowverse, sharing continuity with the other television series of the universe, and is a spin-off of Arrow and The Flash. The season was produced by Berlanti Productions, Warner Bros. Television, and DC Entertainment, with Phil Klemmer and Keto Shimizu serving as showrunners.

The season was ordered in January 2020. Production began that October and concluded in May 2021. Principal cast members Caity Lotz, Tala Ashe, Jes Macallan, Olivia Swann, Amy Louise Pemberton, Nick Zano, Dominic Purcell and Matt Ryan return from previous seasons, while Adam Tsekhman and Shayan Sobhian were promoted to the main cast from their recurring status in previous seasons. They are joined by new cast member Lisseth Chavez.

== Episodes ==
Season six episodes
No. overall	No. in season	Title	Directed by	Written by	Original release date	Prod. code	U.S. viewers (millions)
83	1	"Ground Control to Sara Lance"	Kevin Mock	James Eagan & Mark Bruner	May 2, 2021	T13.22551	0.44
In 1977 London, Ava Sharpe realizes that Sara Lance is missing, and learns from David Bowie that she was going to propose but was abducted by aliens. Ava is consoled by Nate Heywood and contacts the D.E.O., unaware that it was destroyed. (Note: As depicted in season 5 of Supergirl.) John Constantine returns to his house with Zari Tarazi and Astra Logue and fails to find Sara using magic, but discovers a human chrysalis in Gary Green's room and Image Inducer glasses that can transform its wearer. Behrad Tarazi learns of a girl who could communicate with aliens named Esperenza Cruz; Mick Rory kidnaps her. Sara awakens on a spaceship and frees Spartacus, only for him to be eaten by Kayla, the boss of the ship. She discovers one of her captors is Gary, who was sent to Earth to acquire the most quintessential human, but he agrees to help her escape. They knock Kayla (also Gary's fiancée) out of the ship by releasing containment pods into a wormhole leading to Earth's Temporal Zone, but fail to reach the wormhole themselves and fall towards another planet.
84	2	"Meat: The Legends"	Rachel Talalay	Matthew Maala & Morgan Faust	May 9, 2021	T13.22552	0.47
The Legends track an alien to 1955 San Bernardino, California to before the death of the town. At Big Bang Burger, a burger joint run by Bert Beeman, they learn about attacks at places with meat. Nate, Zari, and Behrad get jobs there and learn that restaurant's secret sauce causes people to go berserk and was made by Bert's wife Rhonda who wanted her family to outdo those two brothers. Ava finds a cocoon in her attic and learns that the sauce is pus dripping from the cocoon, which hatches a moth-like alien that eats Rhonda and Bert; Spooner shoots it dead. Meanwhile, as Zari and Behrad argue over who should use the Air Totem, Zari Tomaz splits it in two for both siblings to use. Spooner tries to convince Ava that Sara is gone and that pursuing aliens will lead to more loss. Afterwards, waitress Sandy Sledge takes over Big Bang Burger and turns it into the first Big Belly Burger. Sara and Gary find Amelia Earhart on an alien planet, but she transforms into an alien and attacks them. They escape and are stopped by soldiers.
85	3	"The Ex-Factor"	David A. Geddes	Grainne Godfree & Tyron B. Carter	May 16, 2021	T13.22553	0.38
The Legends travel to 2045 Hollywood to stop an alien named Lord Knoxicrillion from killing DJ S'More Money, Zari's ex-boyfriend, who is judging a competition called "Da Throne," but he believes Knoxicrillion to be a performer and promotes them to the finals. To stop Knoxicrillion from invading, the Legends convince them that winning the competition will make them king of Earth. Mick grows upset with Sara's disappearance and his daughter Lita's ignorance. Zari tells her mother that she doesn't think her relationship with Constantine will last, but he overhears and later walks out on her during an interview. They later reconcile and outperform Knoxicrillion, who reveals himself as a small alien piloting a suit. Mick kills them and begins a search for Kayla, who can lead them to Sara. Meanwhile, Gary eats their pursuers and finds that they're Ava clones. Sara follows one back to its base, where she meets a man who has been "waiting a long time for her."
86	4	"Bay of Squids"	Sudz Sutherland	Phil Klemmer	May 23, 2021	T13.22554	0.42
Kayla lands in 1962 Cuba. While searching, Mick steals a missile, not knowing that it's the Cuban Missile Crisis. Ava kidnaps Kayla and Behrad is mistaken for Che Guevara and brought to Fidel Castro. Nate and Zari travel to Washington, D.C. and infiltrate John F. Kennedy's inner circle hoping to de-escalate tensions. Mick and Spooner are forced to cede the missile, which Castro orders to be fired at D.C. after being attacked by Kayla, who he assumes to be an American mutant. Zari sabotages a retaliation order from General Kilgore, and Nate stops JFK from launching a counterstrike. The missile lands in D.C., but doesn't detonate. Nate sees Zari for who she is now and not as a reminder of the Zari he lost. Meanwhile, Kayla agrees to help Mick find Sara in exchange for returning her home. She transforms into a human through an Image Inducer ring and they leave on the Waverider while the rest of the Legends travel to Constantine's house.
87	5	"The Satanist's Apprentice"	Caity Lotz	Keto Shimizu & Ray Utarnachitt	June 6, 2021	T13.22555	0.42
At Constantine's manor, Astra struggles with everyday chores and is ignored by Constantine. She finds occultist Aleister Crowley trapped in a painting. He teaches her magic and about the Fountain of Imperium, an alien magic source. During an argument with Constantine, she gives Crowley control of his body, and when the Legends arrive at the manor, she transforms them into household objects. However, Crowley betrays her and transforms everyone into cartoon characters. Astra reverts this and traps him with a spell created by her mother at the cost of everyone's magical abilities, forcing Astra and Constantine to begin anew. Meanwhile, Sara meets Bishop, her kidnapper and creator of all Ava clones. After healing her of Zaguron poison, Bishop claims that human greed doomed Earth and intends to restart humanity using alien DNA. Sara works with an Ava clone to escape, but she betrays her and leads Bishop to her ship. Sara kills Bishop, but she is knocked out and meets him again in his lair.
88	6	"Bishop's Gambit"	Kevin Mock	James Eagan & Emily Cheever	June 13, 2021	T13.22556	0.41
Gideon, reinstalled in Constantine's manor, alerts the Legends to a massacre done by the Amelia Earhart alien, who used Sara Lance as an alias and arrived alone in the Waverider. After retrieving her from a mental institution in 1956 Rye, New York, Astra reads her memories and finds that she is the real Amelia who was abducted and fused with the DNA of a Zaguron. It overtakes Amelia and claims that it killed Sara, and that there is an alien inside Spooner before being killed by Ava. Constantine and Astra cover up the loss of his abilities to Zari. Meanwhile, Mick is captured on Bishop's planet by Ava clones, and Bishop tries to kill him by exposing him to the toxic atmosphere, despite endangering the Ava clones. Gary rescues a dying Ava clone while Mick escapes and shares an oxygen mask with Kayla, and the two have sex afterward. Bishop reveals himself as a clone to Sara. Sara attacks Bishop after learning that Mick may have died, but he reveals that she too is a clone and unveils the real Sara's dead body.
89	7	"Back to the Finale: Part II"	Glen Winter	Morgan Faust & Mark Bruner	June 20, 2021	T13.22557	0.45
While grieving Sara, the Legends (without Ava) follow Behrad back to 1977 London to stop Sara's abduction. During several failed attempts, the past Ava finds and orders them to return to the future, Zari deduces that Constantine lost his magic, Spooner discusses her fears with the past Sara, and a future Nate arrives stating that their plans fail before being erased. Bishop reveals that Sara died from Zaguron poison, which has no cure, and has her incinerated. He then creates a new Sara clone and reveals that she is the first to be fused with the DNA of an alien. Mick kills Bishop, unknowingly allowing him to upload his consciousness, forcing Sara to abandon a plan to create a fully-human clone. Gary detonates Bishop's base, and the Ava clones choose to stay behind. When attacked by Zagurons, Kayla sacrifices herself to allow Sara, Mick, and Gary to escape from the planet. They reunite with the Legends and Sara proposes to Ava, who happily accepts.
90	8	"Stressed Western"	David Ramsey	Matthew Maala	June 27, 2021	T13.22558	0.44
Sara reveals her regenerating alien-human hybrid clone status to Ava and asks her to keep quiet. The Legends travel to 1891 Fist City, Oklahoma Territory, where they find the town's residents to be abnormally kind and inviting. They later learn that Levi Stapleton, the sheriff, keeps the town compliant using an alien worm that devours angry people, which Gary identifies as a Haverick. Sara challenges Stapleton to a duel and is shot, but regenerates, revealing her secret. Stapleton loses the whistle controlling the Haverick and is devoured. Astra and Spooner meet Bass Reeves (who Sara later mistakes for John Diggle), who had been maligned by Stapleton. The Legends' bickering summons the Haverack, but it is destroyed by Astra and Spooner. Afterwards, Reeves cleans up Fist City, Gary tells Constantine of a map to the Fountain of Imperium (which is on Earth), and Behrad gives his and Zari's totem to Nate so he can visit the other Zari.
91	9	"This Is Gus"	Eric Dean Seaton	Tyron B. Carter	July 11, 2021	T13.22559	0.40
On Behrad's birthday, the Legends track an alien to 2023 Vancouver, British Columbia, where Behrad's favorite sitcom "Bud Stuy" is being recorded. Spooner shoots the pod out of the sky, knocking it onto the set where a Gusarax escapes, altering the timeline. The director, Kamran Saaed, bonds with the Gusarax and opts to incorporate aliens into the show, upsetting his brother and the lead, Imran, who later quits. The new timeline erases Behrad's memories of the Legends and both his and Zari's totems, and transforms him into a cold businessman intent on marketing the Gusarax. However, Zari and Astra get Imran and Kamran to reconcile while the Gusarax bonds with Nate instead, restoring the timeline. Meanwhile, Mick is angered to find that the 2023 Lita is pregnant and leaves to kill her boyfriend Niko. He calms down when he realizes that Lita and Niko will be loving parents. Afterwards, the Legends celebrate Behrad's birthday. Zari safely trades places with Zari Tomaz and Gary reveals that Kayla laid eggs in Mick's ear.
92	10	"Bad Blood"	Alexandra La Roche	Grainne Godfree	July 18, 2021	T13.22560	0.39
Constantine acquires a map to the fountain and a magic potion from a vampire named Noelle. He recruits Spooner and travels to 1939 Albacete, Spain, in search of a man known as El Gato, who they believe used the fountain's magic to survive several assassination attempts. They meet with him and find that his mute nephew, Fernando, wields the fountain's magic and has been using it to resurrect his uncle. Fernando leads Constantine and Spooner to the fountain, but find that it's dried up. When attacked by Captain Noriega, an ally of Adolf Hitler, Constantine resorts to using the magic potion to kill him. Afterwards, Constantine trades Crowley's soul to Noelle for more potions, and brainwashes Spooner when she threatens to tell Zari. Meanwhile, the Legends struggle with the Gusarax's rapid aging, and are forced to eject him from the Waverider when he becomes too hostile. With Lita's help, Mick grows to accept his pregnancy.
93	11	"The Final Frame"	Jes Macallan	James Eagan & Ray Utarnachitt	August 8, 2021	T13.22561	0.45
Sara, Mick, Astra, and Spooner find a puzzle box inside the last alien pod in 2021 Kansas City, Kansas, which transports them to Galaxy Lanes, a bowling alley in space. The champions, The Pin Killers, miniaturize Earth into a bowling ball, stranding Nate and Zari, who were camping in Alaska. The owner, Buddy, explains that if the Legends defeat the Pin Killers, Earth will be restored. If they lose, Earth will remain that way and the Legends will disintegrate. While searching for help, Zari wonders if her relationship with Nate is worth having if they can stand to be apart. Meanwhile, Gary tries to distract Ava by helping her find the perfect wedding dress as Constantine uses a spell to bring the Waverider to Galaxy Lanes. Sara struggles to get her team to cooperate, but she remains optimistic and helps them unite. On Earth, Zari shoots at Mike the Strike's finger, disrupting a roll, allowing Sara's team to defeat the Pin Killers. Afterwards, Nate reassures Zari of his desire to be with her, Sara restores Earth, and the Legends reunite at the bowling alley. When Buddy notices Constantine, he worries that his power could be the death of him.
94	12	"Bored on Board Onboard"	Harry Jierjian	Keto Shimizu & Leah Poulliot	August 15, 2021	T13.22562	0.35
Since Constantine's magic damaged the Waverider's jump drive, the Legends must take a three-week journey back to Earth. Zari swaps out with Zari Tarazi, and Constantine continues juicing after suffering from withdrawal. Constantine transports everyone (except Gary and Mick) inside a board game called "Beast Slayer". The game becomes horrifyingly realistic, so Sara tries to end it by revealing herself as the beast only to be killed by a new one. Constantine learns that the new beast is a "dark side" of himself who states that the magic is in control of him before being stabbed by Zari, ending the game. Concurrently, Kayla, who survived her ordeal, arrives on the Waverider and fixes the jump drive, but later attacks Gary and Mick out of an allegiance to someone who helped her escape. Mick reveals his pregnancy, but she knocks him out. Kayla's severed tentacle begins creating a new body and strangles Gary. Afterwards, Zari admits her love for Constantine to Behrad despite his warnings, but later finds Constantine's stab wound and realizes he was the beast. Sara follows a voice on the Waverider and finds Bishop.
95	13	"Silence of the Sonograms"	Nico Sachse	Phil Klemmer & Morgan Faust	August 22, 2021	T13.22563	0.41
Sara finds and captures Bishop, who explains that Kayla was only able to download 94% of Bishop's original genome due to Sara's actions. Ava interrogates him, but he swears that he's turned over a new leaf. Ava pretends to be vulnerable by allowing Bishop to help plan their wedding, but she begins to sympathize with him. As Mick goes into labor, Sara and Ava discover that the other 6% of Bishop's genome belongs to Sara, allowing Bishop to override Gideon and defeat Sara. He delivers 48 eggs through Mick's nose before willfully returning to imprisonment. Meanwhile, Zari confronts Constantine, who is still being taunted by his dark side. Astra restores Spooner's memories, and Zari steals a potion from Constantine, which Astra identifies as a Scarlett Lady, blood from Hell. Constantine confronts Zari, but chooses to throw out the potions and the two reconcile. Afterwards, Sara finds that Bishop aided in Mick's delivery in order to steal his comms. He contacts Constantine, who has been overtaken by his dark side despite his actions, with an offer to find a way to officially restore his magic.
96	14	"There Will Be Brood"	Maisie Richardson-Sellers	Ray Utarnachitt & Marcelena Campos Mayhorn	August 29, 2021	T13.22564	0.43
Constantine and Bishop disable Gideon and steal the Waverider to search for the Fountain of Imperium in 1925 Texas. Spooner and Astra stow away and defend Spooner's mother Gloria from having her land taken. Alongside Constantine, they meet a younger Esperanza. Constantine knocks everyone out and reveals to Spooner that Gloria will be killed while defending her land and that Esperanza will flee to the woods where the Fountain will transport her to the future. That night, Bishop and Constantine activate the Fountain. Spooner reveals her identity to Gloria and protects her and her land while Astra sends young Esperanza to the future. Meanwhile, the rest of the Legends lure Kayla back to Earth using Mick's eggs in order to use her ship and rescue the eggs from the Waverider, but they discover that Bishop has set a trap and Mick gets caught in an explosion while attempting to save one of the eggs. Constantine links to the Fountain and attempts to betray Bishop, but he anticipated this and poisons him, weakening the Fountain and knocking out Spooner. Bishop reveals the Fountain was an alien gift that would safeguard Earth from invasions and escapes. Constantine is enveloped by the dying Imperium at Astra's and Zari's side.
97	15	"The Fungus Amongus"	David A. Geddes	Keto Shimizu & James Eagan	September 5, 2021	T13.22565	0.39
Bishop steals Kayla's ship and Mick saves the last egg. With the Fountain weakened, Zaguron scouts are able to invade but are killed by Sara, Ava, and Nate. Zari and Astra inform the Legends of Constantine's death and bring back a mushroom, which Behrad hypothesizes to be Constantine. Sara eats the mushroom to connect with him and is reminded that everyone is connected. The Legends kidnap a young Bishop from 2212 Vancouver and have him create an antidote that awakens Spooner, but the Fountain still isn't restored, allowing Zaguron pods to land on Earth. Fearing it may be their last day, Spooner begs her mother to flee while Sara and Ava move up their wedding. Bishop arrives on Kayla's ship and opens the pods, but the Legends' connection revives the Fountain and allows them to use each other's special abilities to kill the Zagurons. Mick's eggs hatch and devour Bishop. Afterwards, Mick plans to leave with Kayla and bids farewell to Sara. Zari mourns Constantine when he suddenly arrives from Hell, damned once more. He gives Zari a key and bids her farewell, wanting to walk his path alone. After returning young Bishop to 2212, a second Waverider appears and destroys the first before disappearing, stranding the Legends.

== Cast and characters ==
=== Main ===
- Caity Lotz as Sara Lance / White Canary
- Tala Ashe as Zari Tomaz and Zari Tarazi
- Jes Macallan as Ava Sharpe (Note: Jes Macallan also portrays other Ava clones.)
- Olivia Swann as Astra Logue
- Adam Tsekhman as Gary Green
- Shayan Sobhian as Behrad Tarazi
- Lisseth Chavez as Esperanza "Spooner" Cruz
- Amy Louise Pemberton as Gideon
- Nick Zano as Nate Heywood / Steel
- Dominic Purcell as Mick Rory / Heat Wave
- Matt Ryan as John Constantine (Note: Despite being considered as part of the main cast, Matt Ryan is credited in the special appearance billing.)

=== Recurring ===
- Raffi Barsoumian as Bishop
- Aliyah O'Brien as Kayla

=== Guest ===
- Thomas Nicholson as David Bowie
- Shawn Roberts as Spartacus
- Greg Kean as Bert Beeman
- Jen Oleksiuk as Amelia Earhart
- Kirsten Robeck as Rhonda Beeman
- Mitra Lohrasb as Nasreen Tarazi
- Marco Soriano as the Host
- Nic Bishop as General Kilgore, Levi Stapleton, and Mike the Strike
- Aaron Craven as John F. Kennedy
- Tim Perez as Fidel Castro
- Matt Lucas as the voice of Aleister Crowley
- Russell Roberts as Robert Truss
- David Ramsey as Bass Reeves
- Duane Keogh as Cowboy Narrator
- AnnaLynne McCord as Irma Rose
- Mina Sundwall as Lita
- Shawn Ahmed as Imran Saeed
- Saad Siddiqui as Kamran Saeed
- Ricardo Ortiz as Fernando
  - Hector Meneu Hueso as the voice of Fernando
- Leo Rano as Captain Noriega
- Alexander Soto as El Gato
- Alvin Sanders as Buddy
- Steve Bacic as Doc
- Alexandra Castillo as Gloria Cruz
- Dominique Lucky Martell as young Esperanza Cruz

== Production ==
=== Development ===
In January 2020, The CW renewed the series for a sixth season. Keto Shimizu and Phil Klemmer return as showrunners.

=== Writing ===
In February 2020, Klemmer said the theme of season six would be one that the writers had since the first season, but declined to reveal what it was. It was later revealed that the season would involve aliens. Regarding the decision to make aliens the villains of the season, Klemmer said this was to differentiate them from previous villains. He added, "To think about little green men with laser guns who just want to rule the world, you know, Marvin the Martian kinda shape, you're like, "Yes, that's what we need!" Not having to understand who our villains are on any kind of emotional scale means we can focus on the emotional stories of our characters". The fifth season ended with Sara Lance being abducted by aliens. According to an interview with Klemmer, the season will feature a "motley assortment" of aliens, and will focus on the team attempting to rescue Sara, as well as Sara's experiences in outer space.

=== Casting ===
Main cast members Caity Lotz, Tala Ashe, Jes Macallan, Olivia Swann, Amy Louise Pemberton, Nick Zano, Dominic Purcell, and Matt Ryan return as Sara Lance / White Canary, Zari Tarazi, Ava Sharpe, Astra Logue, Gideon, Nate Heywood / Steel, Mick Rory / Heat Wave, and John Constantine. Shayan Sobhian, who recurred as Behrad Tarazi in season five, was promoted to series regular with this season. Maisie Richardson-Sellers, who had been a regular since season two, left the series ahead of season six in order to "make her mark as a filmmaker on her own", though she does appear through archive footage in the seventh episode. In September 2020, Lisseth Chavez joined the main cast as an original character named Esperanza "Spooner" Cruz. The following month, Adam Tsekhman, who recurred as Gary Green since the third season, was promoted to the main cast. In December 2020, David Ramsey, who portrayed John Diggle in the Arrowverse, was revealed to be appearing in the season in an undisclosed role. In January 2021, Aliyah O'Brien was cast in a recurring role for the sixth season. On April 17, 2021, Purcell announced he would be leaving the series after the sixth season, but will return periodically in the seventh season. On July 25, 2021, it was announced that the sixth season would be the last for Ryan to portray John Constantine (though he portrayed a new character in the seventh season). Tala Ashe also portrayed Zari Tomaz who returned in a reduced capacity.

=== Filming ===
Principal photography for the sixth season was scheduled to begin on October 5, 2020, in Burnaby, British Columbia. However, by September 29, the start of filming was indefinitely delayed, because of delays in receiving COVID-19 test results for the cast and crew. Filming ultimately began on October 8, and concluded on May 8, 2021.

== Marketing ==
In early August 2020, The CW released several posters of the Arrowverse superheroes wearing face masks, including White Canary and Beebo, with all posters having the caption "Real Heroes Wear Masks". This marketing tactic was used to "raise public awareness on the efficacy of facial coverings preventing the spread of COVID-19".

== Release ==
The season premiered on May 2, 2021, and ended on September 5. The season consisted of 15 episodes same as the previous season and two more than the next one. The episodes hold an average of 410,000 viewers per episode. The episode "Meat: The Legends" 440,000 live viewers, making it the season's most-watched episode. The lowest-viewed episode was "Board on Board Onboard", which had 350,000 viewers.

=== Reception ===
Viewership and ratings per episode of Legends of Tomorrow season 6
No.	Title	Air date	Rating (18–49)	Viewers (millions)	DVR (18–49)	DVR viewers (millions)	Total (18–49)	Total viewers (millions)
1	"Ground Control to Sara Lance"	May 2, 2021	0.1	0.44	0.2	0.45	0.3	0.89
2	"Meat: The Legends"	May 9, 2021	0.1	0.47	0.1	0.38	0.2	0.85
3	"The Ex-Factor"	May 16, 2021	0.1	0.38	0.1	0.35	0.2	0.73
4	"Bay of Squids"	May 23, 2021	0.1	0.42	0.2	0.41	0.2	0.82
5	"The Satanist's Apprentice"	June 6, 2021	0.1	0.42	0.1	0.40	0.2	0.82
6	"Bishop's Gambit"	June 13, 2021	0.1	0.41	0.1	0.40	0.2	0.82
7	"Back to the Finale Part II"	June 20, 2021	0.1	0.45	0.1	0.42	0.2	0.87
8	"Stressed Western"	June 27, 2021	0.1	0.44	0.1	0.37	0.2	0.81
9	"This Is Gus"	July 11, 2021	0.1	0.40	0.1	0.44	0.2	0.83
10	"Bad Blood"	July 18, 2021	0.1	0.39	0.1	0.42	0.2	0.80
11	"The Final Frame"	August 8, 2021	0.1	0.45	0.1	0.32	0.2	0.77
12	"Bored on Board Onboard"	August 15, 2021	0.1	0.35	0.1	0.32	0.2	0.67
13	"Silence of the Sonograms"	August 22, 2021	0.1	0.41	0.1	0.38	0.2	0.79
14	"There Will Be Brood"	August 29, 2021	0.1	0.43	TBD	TBD	TBD	TBD
15	"The Fungus Amongus"	September 5, 2021	0.1	0.39	TBD	TBD	TBD	TBD
