= Wet Hot American Bummer =

- Legends of Tomorrow episode
- Episode no.: Season 4 Episode 4
- Directed by: David Geddes
- Written by: Ray Utarnachitt; Tyron B. Carter
- Production code: T13.21054
- Original air date: December 11, 2018

Episode chronology
← Previous "Dancing Queen"	Next → "Tagumo Attacks!!!"
- Legends of Tomorrow season 4

"Wet Hot American Bummer" is the fourth episode of the fourth season and fifty-fifth episode overall of the American science fiction series Legends of Tomorrow. The episode was written by Ray Utarnachitt and Tyron B. Carter and directed by David Geddes. The episode first aired on The CW on November 12, 2018, to an audience of 900 thousand viewers; it was reviewed positively by critics.

The series revolves around an eponymous team of superheroes and their time-traveling adventures. It is set in the Arrowverse, sharing continuity with the other television series of the universe. "Wet Hot American Bummer" sees the Legends visit a summer camp and capture a monster that is killing children.

== Plot ==
Ava Sharpe and Sara Lance are watching a movie, which Sara discovers is based on a real event. Suddenly Gideon calls and reveals that she discovered an anachronism. Sara takes Ava to the Waverider and, along with the other Legends, travel to Camp Ogawa in 1995. They pretend to be camp counselors and approach the children but learn nothing. When the Legends confront the camp executive, she reveals several children have gone missing. The campers tell Ava about the legend of a lake brute. They say the best way to see him is to get to the dock alone and state his name. Ava visits the dock and follows the instructions; something leaps out of the water frightening her. However, the "beast" is just a mannequin, and the campers pranked her. Frustrated with her inability to connect with them, she cancels their daily activities. Sara asks John Constantine for a potion that will turn her and Ava into children to better connect.

Meanwhile, while Ray Palmer and Constantine are searching in a nearby forest, they find shredded skin. Constantine identifies it as belonging to a Shtriga. He casts a spell that will lead them to the missing children and finds an abandoned shack. Ray and Constantine find the missing children unconscious; he casts a spell to heal them. However, one of the children does not wake up. Constantine transfers part of his life force to the child, saving him, before falling unconscious himself.

On the Waverider, Charlie fakes being injured to escape her confiment. When Zari Tomaz enters her cell to check on her, Charlie overwhelms her and escapes. While attempting to pilot the Waverider, she is caught by Mick Rory. However, instead of locking her up again, Mick offers her a beer and the pair bond. Charlie reveals that the monster they are hunting searching for pretends to be young and attractive. With the information, Sara realizes who the monster is and kills it.

Constantine wakes up on the Waverider, Gideon informs him she cannot heal him. Charlie agrees to help the Legends, officially joining the team, on the condition that they do not lock her up again.

== Production ==
"Wet Hot American Bummer" was directed by David Geddes. It entered pre-production on July 31, 2018, and concluded on August 9. Filming began the following day and finished on August 22. The episode was written by Ray Utarnachitt and Tyron B. Carter. The first draft was submitted on August 1, 2018, the version was finished on August 9. The episode's title is a reference to the 2001 film Wet Hot American Summer.

The in-universe review for the fictional Swamp Thaaaang, "the production design is as lazy as the action staging", was taken from a review by The A.V. Club's Oliver Sava for the Legends of Tomorrow season one episode "Last Refuge" (2016). "Last Refuge" was the first episode of television written by Matthew Maala. After the episode's release, he would frequently quote Sava's review. Speaking with The A.V. Club, Utarnachitt stated he believed the inclusion of the line was a "writers' room pitch" and did not remember who suggested it.

The episode stars Caity Lotz, Jes Macallan, Matt Ryan, Brandon Routh, Courtney Ford, Dominic Purcell, Tala Ashe, and Maisie Richardson-Sellers as Sara Lance / White Canary, Ava Sharpe, John Constantine, Ray Palmer / The Atom, Nora Dahrk, Mick Rory / Heatwave, Zari Tomaz, and Charlie. Series regular Nick Zano does not appear in the episode. Zano explained that his absence was due to the birth of his daughter.

== Release ==
"Wet Hot American Bummer" was aired on The CW on November 12, 2018. The episode was viewed by an audience of 900 thousand viewers down around four thousand from the previous episode. When accounting for seven day DVR viewership the episode was seen by 1.65 million viewers. The episode was the second lowest viewed episode of the season overall.

=== Critical reception ===
On the review aggregator website Rotten Tomatoes, 100% of six critics' reviews are positive. Writing for Comic Book Resources, Dave Richards praised how the episode parodied the horror genre. Den of Geek's Shamus Kelley rated the episode a 4.5/5. Kelley praised how the episode handled Constantine and how it rationalized his paranoia. Entertainment Weekly's Shirley Li praised the way the episode paired off its characters.

The A.V. Club's Sam Barsanti listed "Wet Hot American Bummer" as one of the series best. He praised the mention of the "Last Refuge" review noting that the line would have read as "painfully desperate" on a worse show. In a contemporary review, Alison Shoemaker gave the episode an "A-". Shoemaker praised the episode's writing and use of its characters feeling that everyone was perfectly paired together. She felt that the only problems with the episode was the child actors, the Shtriga, and Charlie. Despite this Shoemaker praised how Richardson-Sellers differentiated Charlie from her previous character, Amaya Jiwe.
