= Legends of Tomorrow season 7 =

Legends of Tomorrow
- Season 7
- Home media cover
- Starring: Caity Lotz; Tala Ashe; Jes Macallan; Olivia Swann; Adam Tsekhman; Shayan Sobhian; Lisseth Chavez; Amy Louise Pemberton; Nick Zano; Matt Ryan
- No. of episodes: 13

Release
- Original network: The CW
- Original release: October 13, 2021 – March 2, 2022

Season chronology
- ← Previous; Season 6

The seventh and final season of the American television series Legends of Tomorrow, which is based on characters from DC Comics, premiered on The CW on October 13, 2021, and ended on March 2, 2022, consisting of 13 episodes. It is set in the Arrowverse, sharing continuity with the other television series of the universe, and is a spin-off of Arrow and The Flash. The season was produced by Berlanti Productions, Warner Bros. Television, and DC Entertainment, with Phil Klemmer and Keto Shimizu serving as showrunners.

The season was announced in February 2021. Principal cast members Caity Lotz, Tala Ashe, Jes Macallan, Olivia Swann, Adam Tsekhman, Shayan Sobhian, Lisseth Chavez, Amy Louise Pemberton, Nick Zano, and Matt Ryan return from previous seasons.

== Episodes ==
Season seven episodes
No. overall	No. in season	Title	Directed by	Written by	Original release date	Prod. code	U.S. viewers (millions)
98	1	"The Bullet Blondes"	Kevin Mock	James Eagan & Ray Utarnachitt	October 13, 2021	T13.23201	0.59
A second Waverider destroys the original, stranding the Legends in 1925 Odessa, Texas. They pass the recent alien invasion off as a circus act, but Esperanza "Spooner" Cruz stops this in order to take pressure off of her mother Gloria. The Legends learn that a safe containing a Time Courier was given to the sheriff, so Nate Heywood retrieves it by impersonating J. Edgar Hoover, but they find that Mick Rory took the Time Courier for a beer run. Astra Logue inadvertently causes an explosion while attempting to reform the Waverider, alerting the real Hoover to their location. Using John Constantine's key, they hide in a Hell pocket dimension with a duplicate of his mansion. Sara Lance and Ava Sharpe suggest they travel to New York City to ask Gwyn Davies, the forefather of time travel, for help. They form a bank-robbing duo called The Bullet Blondes in order to lure Hoover away, and leave with Nate, Gary Green, and Behrad Tarazi while Zari Tarazi stays in the mansion. While leaving Odessa, Nate accidentally kills Hoover in self-defense and Gary eats the body in order to hide it. Astra inadvertently creates a human Gideon.
99	2	"The Need for Speed"	Alexandra La Roche	Morgan Faust & Marcelena Campos Mayhorn	October 20, 2021	T13.23202	0.52
Sara's group catches a train to New York. Nate impersonates Hoover using a potion made by Gary while Sara and Ava return to the mansion. Ava helps Zari cope with her breakup and the two focus on identifying who destroyed the Waverider. As Nate struggles to come to terms with killing Hoover, the train is stopped by FBI agents. To keep up appearances, Nate pretends to coerce a Russian man into confessing about a kidnapping. He realizes that the FBI agents are fakes sent by Al Capone to kidnap him instead and that the train has been rerouted to Chicago. Nate tries to give himself up, but Gary's potion wears off. Realizing that his captors cannot complete their task for reasons outside of their control, Nate forgives himself for Hoover's death. The Bullet Blondes pay off Capone's men, but are caught by an aggressive robot duplicate of Hoover who then self-destructs, suggesting that robots destroyed the Waverider. Back in Texas, Gideon acts erratically and is unable to speak. Spooner restores her speech and she states that they must reach Davies' time travel experiment in two weeks before the Legends do, or else they will die.
100	3	"wvrdr_error_100<oest-of-th3-gs.gid30n> not found"	Caity Lotz	Phil Klemmer & Matthew Maala	October 27, 2021	T13.23203	0.51
Gideon struggles with making decisions and collapses. Astra and Spooner enter her mind and meet a memory of Jefferson "Jax" Jackson defending her subconsciousness. Astra and Spooner help Gideon recover lost memories of the Legends, which included Ray Palmer, Carter Hall, Leonard Snart, Martin Stein, Rip Hunter, Nora Darhk, and Zari Tomaz. Along the way, Gideon is attacked by a virus representing the part of her that does not want to be human. It corrupts her memories, forces her to re-experience the deaths of several Legends, and reveals that Rip had reprogrammed her to prioritize the Legends' safeties over the timeline's. Jax, Astra, and Spooner uncorrupt the memories and show Gideon happier ones, convincing her to embrace her humanity and seize control of the virus. She is comforted by her memories of all of the Legends and wakes up. In 2213 Vancouver, British Columbia, the younger Bishop has dreams of his future self and the Legends from the alien invasion in 1925. He finds a copy of Gideon that he downloaded and factory resets her, undoing Rip's protocol and allowing Bishop to use her against the Legends.
101	4	"Speakeasy Does It"	Kristin Windell	Keto Shimizu & Emily Cheever	November 3, 2021	T13.23204	0.56
Sara's group hides from another Hoover robot in a Chicago speakeasy. They raise money by selling the mansion's infinite drinks at the bar and give the rest of the sales to Eddie the bartender. This violates Eddie's deal with his gangster landlord Ross Bottoni, who takes the club back. Zari raises money for Eddie by holding a party in the mansion with a performance by The Bullet Blondes. Gary notices that Nate places himself in doomed relationships so that he won't have to commit to them, motivating Nate to talk to Tomaz. Meanwhile, Spooner's group sneaks onto a train to Chicago with the help of the Masqueradies, a jazz band. Their leader, Maude Beaumont, is trapped in an abusive relationship with Bottoni, though Spooner's group is able to help her cut ties. The Hoover robot finds Zari's party, but the Legends capture him. Spooner's group tries to catch up to Sara's, but fails; Gary has already boarded a train to New York with the rest of the Legends in the mansion. Zari swaps out with Tomaz in order to interrogate the Hoover robot.
102	5	"It's a Mad, Mad, Mad, Mad Scientist"	Andrew Kasch	Paiman Kalayeh & Mark Bruner	November 10, 2021	T13.23205	0.48
Sara's group arrives in New York and discovers that Davies' time machine is missing one component. Gary finds it, but it is confiscated by Thomas Edison, who fires Davies and takes his plans. The Legends also learn that the Hoover robot was sent to replace the original and eliminate them. Behrad activates the machine, but this erases Ava and Gary. Davies agrees to help Sara if she helps him get his loved one back. Zari reprograms Hoover to steal Davies' plans back from Edison, but he explodes, giving Edison a heart attack, so the second Waverider delivers new robots for both of them. Davies activates the machine himself, restoring Ava and Gary. Nate suggests that Zari move into the mansion where she can exist freely, but she wants them to live in the Air Totem. Meanwhile, Spooner's group nearly makes it to New York with the help of Erwin George Baker. After their car is stolen, Astra short-circuits all of New York in order to stop the machine. They reunite with Sara's group and successfully activate the machine with a chip from the Hoover robot, but land in an unknown place and time.
103	6	"Deus Ex Latrina"	Nico Sachse	Ray Utarnachitt & Mercedes Valle	November 17, 2021	T13.23206	0.50
In 2214 Vancouver, Bishop builds his own Waverider with schematics from his Gideon. He and his Ava clone assistant become Time Masters, travel to 1925, and destroy the Legends' Waverider. They correct the resulting aberrations by using the Ava clone technology to build robot replacements of people. In order to force Bishop to fulfill his new duty as a Time Master, the AI Gideon ejects the Ava clone into the timestream and creates a Bishop robot who will live out the rest of his life, but this only demotivates him. Meanwhile, Davies' time machine breaks, so Astra and Spooner help Sara and Ava express their frustrations. Nate decides to move into the Air Totem, while Gary and Gideon bond over their experiences as humans. Davies tells Zari that he built the time machine to rescue his allies from World War I, including his crush, Alun Thomas. Behrad learns they're in 1986 Chernobyl on the day of the meltdown. Davies broadcasts an evacuation warning, alerting AI Gideon. The Legends repair the machine and escape, but Bishop escapes from AI Gideon and enters the machine at the last second.
104	7	"A Woman's Place Is in the War Effort!"	Glen Winter	Morgan Faust & Leah Poulliot	November 24, 2021	T13.23207	0.50
The Legends arrive in 1943 with Bishop and lock him in the mansion. The time machine breaks again, so they smuggle components out of a nearby airplane factory in order to repair it. Astra is taunted by the racist boss, Mr. Staples, and accidentally freezes him. She takes over and integrates the factories, prompting most of the white Rosies to quit, so she helps the remaining Rosies finish building the plane. Eleanor Roosevelt comes to the factory and applauds their work, convincing a thawed Mr. Staples to allow them to keep their jobs. Meanwhile, Zari swaps out with Tarazi, and Astra inspires Behrad to stop Bishop from mooching while he teaches Nate taarof in order to appease the ancestors in the Air Totem. Bishop apologizes with a device that will allow Gideon to control the time machine. Eleanor asks Congress to integrate all factories (two years early), but this alerts AI Gideon, who sends soldiers to attack. Bishop kills two soldiers and sacrifices himself to allow the Legends to escape. The soldiers are revealed to be robot clones of the Legends; the two dead ones are revealed to be the Zari and Astra robots.
105	8	"Paranoid Android"	David Geddes	Phil Klemmer & Marcelena Campos Mayhorn	January 12, 2022	T13.23208	0.56
Robot Ava miraculously revives Robot Zari and Robot Astra. The robot Legends, believing they're the real ones, correct aberrations in 1986 Pripyat, Ukraine by killing soldiers who were supposed to die in the Chernobyl meltdown. They manipulate General Kalashnik into framing Davies' broadcast as a false alarm. Robot Sara notices a robot part being pulled out of her while being treated for an injury by Robot Ava. She steals CPUs of the team's medical records and brings them to their Zari, who learns that they are the true robots and that their CPUs were being transferred to new robot bodies upon death. Robot Sara is ordered to assassinate Dr. Irina Petrov, the new sole survivor of Chernobyl, but she spares her and fakes her death. She then threatens Robot Ava, who confirms everything, but AI Gideon promises to make the robot Legends better than the originals. She manipulates and reprograms Robot Zari who captures Robot Sara. Robot Sara is reprogrammed to kill Petrov while Robot Nate succeeds her as captain.
106	9	"Lowest Common Demoninator"	Eric Dean Seaton	James Eagan & Emily Cheever	January 19, 2022	T13.23209	0.55
The Legends arrive in the manor, but Gwyn accidentally allows a reality TV show crew to manifest inside. They are the Cursed Crew, who seek human drama and can amplify emotions to create more. Astra heads to Lowest Common Demoninator Productions to shut the show down and is followed by Behrad. The boss, Harris Ledes, discovers him and threatens his life to keep the show running. Under the show's influence, Sara shirks strategizing with Ava to plan a vacation, Nate and Zari argue about his relationship with Tomaz, Spooner becomes a nudist, Gwyn resolves to rescue Franz Ferdinand to stop World War I, and Gideon surpasses her emotions and dumps Gary after the other Legends react unfavorably to their relationship. She instigates more fighting, leading Gary to eat Bishop's time device. Behrad arrives and admits his emotional vulnerability, interrupting the drama long enough to where the Cursed Crew is able to leave. As everyone reconciles, Astra and Behrad admit their mutual feelings. Gideon suggests they travel to 1914 Sarajevo to stop the assassination of Archduke Ferdinand, much to the Legends' surprise.
107	10	"The Fixed Point"	Maisie Richardson-Sellers	Matthew Maala & Paiman Kalayeh	January 26, 2022	T13.23210	0.57
Since Ferdinand's death was a "fixed point" in history, an aberration there would alert AI Gideon. In Sarajevo, a bartender identifies the Legends as time travelers and brings them to an otherworldly bar where he explains that anyone who tries to change a fixed point is "killed by time." Patrons who want to try wait in a queue and Sara attempts numerous times. Since Astra and Behrad are spending time together, Zari and Spooner connect and Spooner discovers her asexuality. In the mansion, Ava realizes that if Gwyn rescues Alun, he won't invent time travel. Gwyn thinks he does not deserve to be with Alun due to being a man of faith and a homosexual. The Legends realize that someone is freezing time and killing the challengers. Using an anti-time manipulator built from the time machine's parts, Sara finds Eobard Thawne. He states that after his defeat, the Time Wraiths removed his speed, re-educated him, and had him defend the fixed point. He agrees to delay the archduke's assassination by 40 minutes, but only if Sara agrees to take up his duty if he dies. After Thawne resumes time, the Waverider lands near the Legends.
108	11	"Rage Against the Machines"	Jes Macallan	Mark Bruner & Mercedes Valle	February 2, 2022	T13.23211	0.64
The Waverider drops off Robot Sara, Nate, and Behrad who massacre Thawne and the bar patrons. Robot Behrad shoots Ava and is shut down by Astra. Gwyn uses his military experience to devise a plan: the Legends will create more aberrations to lure the robots back while Behrad impersonates his clone and boards the Waverider. He leads Robot Astra and Robot Ava to the mansion, where Gary knocks them into Hell. Robot Zari follows and is broken by Zari, who impersonates her and disables AI Gideon. Spooner tricks Robot Gary into eating Robot Spooner and he explodes. Astra initially refuses to let Gideon participate due to the maternal bond she feels with her, but she eventually allows Gideon to trick Robot Sara into removing her CPU. Nate tricks his clone into taking up Thawne's duty. Gideon returns to the mansion to retrieve Gary and Ava, but Robot Astra reappears and stabs her before shutting down.
109	12	"Too Legit to Quit"	Sudz Sutherland	Morgan Faust & Leah Poulliot	February 23, 2022	T13.23212	0.43
In order to save Gideon, the Legends reactivate AI Gideon and remind her of Protocol 276, which prohibits her from harming herself. Gideon recovers and AI Gideon agrees to spare the Legends if they retire and shows them glimpses of their futures as a sign of good faith. The Legends distrust this and try to destroy AI Gideon, so Gideon agrees to become a Time Master and watch over her. The Legends retire and go their separate ways, with Astra duplicating the mansion key so that they can all visit one another. Gideon rescues Alun, and he and Gwyn admit their feelings for one another. Gary chooses to stay with Gideon, but she later admits that Alun's death was a fixed point and that she created a robot clone of him. Gwyn discovers this and plots to rescue the real Alun. AI Gideon tricks Gary into entering the airlock and ejects him into the timestream. Afterwards, she tells Gideon that it was his decision.
110	13	"Knocked Down, Knocked Up"	Kevin Mock	Phil Klemmer & Keto Shimizu	March 2, 2022	T13.23213	0.46
After landing in 30,000 B.C., Gary returns to the manor. The Legends learn that Gwyn died at the fixed point in 1916 Mametz Wood, France. Gary notices that Sara is pregnant and her regenerative abilities transfer to the baby. The Legends travel to before Gwyn's death, but are stopped by Gideon. Astra and Spooner convince her to turn against AI Gideon, who uploads herself into a clone body. Gideon disables the Waverider's cloaking, causing her clone to become an anomaly. She self-destructs in the Temporal Zone, but Astra shields her group and reforms the Waverider. The others meet with Mike, the Fixer. Gwyn states that anyone attempting to change the battle would be erased in a time paradox, making Mike feel useless. He destroys Gwyn's machine and steals the Waverider to talk to his superiors. Nate rescues Alun, but is permanently depowered by mustard gas. Afterwards, he retires to the Air Totem and Sara reveals her pregnancy. Mike returns with the Waverider, but he and the Legends are arrested by his superiors.

== Cast and characters ==
=== Main ===
- Caity Lotz as Sara Lance / White Canary (Note: This actor also portrays their character's duplicates.)
- Tala Ashe as Zari Tomaz and Zari Tarazi
- Jes Macallan as Ava Sharpe
- Olivia Swann as Astra Logue
- Adam Tsekhman as Gary Green
- Shayan Sobhian as Behrad Tarazi
- Lisseth Chavez as Esperanza "Spooner" Cruz
- Amy Louise Pemberton as Gideon
- Nick Zano as Nate Heywood / Steel
- Matt Ryan as Gwyn Davies (Note: Despite being considered as part of the main cast, Matt Ryan is credited in the special appearance billing.)

=== Recurring ===
- Giacomo Baessato as J. Edgar Hoover

=== Guest ===
- Alexandra Castillo as Gloria Cruz
- Brandon Routh as Ray Palmer
- Victor Garber as Martin Stein
- Franz Drameh as Jefferson "Jax" Jackson
- Arthur Darvill as Rip Hunter
- Courtney Ford as Nora Darhk
- Wentworth Miller as Leonard Snart / Captain Cold
- Raffi Barsoumian as Bishop
- Falk Hentschel as Carter Hall / Hawkman
- Aubrey Reynolds as Maude Beaumont
- Hamza Fouad as Eddie
- Sage Brocklebank as Ross Bottoni
- Christopher Britton as Thomas Edison
- Matthew Clarke as Erwin George Baker
- Kimleigh Smith as a female factory worker
- Jason Gray-Stanford as Mr. Staples
- Ego Mikitas as General Kalashnik
- Stefanie von Pfetten as Irina Petrov
- Giles Panton as Harris Ledes
- Timothy Webber as the Time Authority
- Matt Letscher as Eobard Thawne
- Tom Forbes as Alun Thomas
- Donald Faison as Mike / Booster Gold

== Production ==
=== Development ===
In February 2021, The CW renewed Legends of Tomorrow for a seventh season. Paiman Kalayeh and Mercedes M. Valle joined the writer's room, while Leah Poulliot and Emily F. Cheever were promoted to staff writers. Phil Klemmer and Keto Shimizu return as co-showrunners.

=== Casting ===
Main cast members Caity Lotz, Tala Ashe, Jes Macallan, Olivia Swann, Adam Tsekhman, Shayan Sobhian, Lisseth Chavez, Amy Louise Pemberton, and Nick Zano return as Sara Lance, Zari Tarazi, Ava Sharpe, Astra Logue, Gary Green, Behrad Tarazi, Esperanza Cruz, Gideon and Nate Heywood respectively. In February 2021, Dominic Purcell, who stars as Mick Rory / Heat Wave, indicated he would leave the series after the seventh season as it was the last on his contract. However, two months later, he announced he would be leaving the series after the sixth season, but would return periodically in the seventh; he ultimately did not appear outside of archive footage in the 100th episode. In July, it was announced that and Matt Ryan would be playing a new character named Gwyn Davies, rather than return as John Constantine, and that Pemberton, who voices Gideon, and who had occasionally played a human version of her character in past seasons, will be playing human Gideon full-time.

In October, it was announced that former series regular Wentworth Miller would return for the 100th episode. The following week, former series regulars Victor Garber, Brandon Routh, Courtney Ford, Arthur Darvill, Franz Drameh, and Falk Hentschel were also confirmed to return. The following January, former series regular Matt Letscher returned for two episodes.

In February, Donald Faison was revealed to be appearing in the season finale in an undisclosed role, later revealed to be Booster Gold. Following the finale, it was announced that regardless of whether or not an eighth season would be ordered, this season would be Zano's last appearance as a regular. Zari Tomaz, also portrayed by Tala Ashe, would also exit the series at the end of the season with Zano after being in a reduced capacity since season five. Ashe would have stayed on as Zari Tarazi.

=== Filming ===
Filming began on July 12, 2021, and concluded on December 16.

== Release ==
The season premiered on The CW on October 13, 2021, and consisted of thirteen episodes. The season finale aired on March 2, 2022, and was not intended to be the series finale even though an eighth season had not yet been ordered. Despite this, the series was cancelled on April 29, 2022.

== Reception ==
In a ranking of the series' run for MovieWeb, Richard Fink placed the season sixth, ahead of season one and behind season six.

=== Ratings ===
Viewership and ratings per episode of Legends of Tomorrow season 7
No.	Title	Air date	Rating (18–49)	Viewers (millions)	DVR (18–49)	DVR viewers (millions)	Total (18–49)	Total viewers (millions)
1	"The Bullet Blondes"	October 13, 2021	0.1	0.59	0.1	0.30	0.2	0.89
2	"The Need for Speed"	October 20, 2021	0.1	0.52	0.1	0.37	0.2	0.89
3	"wvrdr_error_100<oest-of-th3-gs.gid30n> not found"	October 27, 2021	0.1	0.51	TBD	TBD	TBD	TBD
4	"Speakeasy Does It"	November 3, 2021	0.1	0.56	TBD	TBD	TBD	TBD
5	"It's a Mad, Mad, Mad, Mad Scientist"	November 10, 2021	0.1	0.48	TBD	TBD	TBD	TBD
6	"Deus Ex Latrina"	November 17, 2021	0.1	0.50	0.1	0.33	0.1	0.83
7	"A Woman's Place is in the War Effort!"	November 24, 2021	0.1	0.50	0.1	0.34	0.2	0.85
8	"Paranoid Android"	January 12, 2022	0.1	0.56	TBD	TBD	TBD	TBD
9	"Lowest Common Demoninator"	January 19, 2022	0.1	0.55	TBD	TBD	TBD	TBD
10	"The Fixed Point"	January 26, 2022	0.1	0.57	TBD	TBD	TBD	TBD
11	"Rage Against The Machines"	February 2, 2022	0.1	0.64	TBD	TBD	TBD	TBD
12	"Too Legit to Quit"	February 23, 2022	0.1	0.43	TBD	TBD	TBD	TBD
13	"Knocked Down, Knocked Up"	March 2, 2022	0.1	0.46	TBD	TBD	TBD	TBD
