= John Constantine (Arrowverse) =

Arrowverse character

- Arrowverse character
- First appearance: "Non Est Asylum"; Constantine; October 24, 2014
- Last appearance: "The Fungus Amongus"; Legends of Tomorrow; September 5, 2021
- Based on: John Constantine by: Alan Moore; Stephen R. Bissette; Rick Veitch; John Totleben
- Adapted by: Daniel Cerone; David S. Goyer
- Portrayed by: Matt Ryan

In-universe information
- Occupation: Exorcist; Demonologist; Warlock; Member of the Legends
- Significant others: Desmond (formerly); Zari Tarazi (formerly)
- Nationality: British

John Constantine (/ˌkɒnstənˈtiːn/ KON-stən-TEEN) is a fictional character in The CW's Arrowverse franchise, introduced in the 2014 first episode of the NBC series Constantine. The character is based on the DC Comics character of the same name, created by Alan Moore, Stephen R. Bissette, Rick Veitch and John Totleben and was adapted for television in 2014 by Daniel Cerone and David S. Goyer. Constantine was continually portrayed by Matt Ryan.

Constantine was originally separate from the Arrowverse franchise; however following the show's cancellation, Constantine appeared on the fourth season of The CW's Arrow, retroactively establishing Constantine as part of the Arrowverse. Constantine would later appear as a recurring character during the third season of Legends of Tomorrow, before being upgraded to a main cast member in its fourth until its sixth.

== Fictional character biography ==
=== Constantine ===
John Constantine was born on May 10, 1982. He is the son of Mary Anne and Thomas Constantine. Mary Anne died giving birth to him, leading Thomas to resent John and deeply blaming him for her death. He also had a unknown older sister, who left him with his abusive father. Thomas later dies years after. In his teenage years, he met Chas Chandler, who would become one of his close friends. At one point, he, Chas, and other friends created a punk rock band called Mucous Membrane and even released an album.

He was also the former cult leader of the Newcastle Crew. However, during a botched exorcism, John accidentally unleashing a demon, who took a young girl Astra Logue with him to Hell. This incident completely changed John and later went incarcerated in Ravenscar Psychiatric Facility for the Mentally Deranged out of guilt, which he's drifted out later. The rest of the members were either traumatized or dead in the following years.

In the present, Constantine journeys across America alongside Chas and a young woman named Zed Martin. Along the way, he solves supernatural mysteries, vanquishes demons, and clashes with officious angels sent to watch over him while protecting the world from the "Rising Darkness". He is also haunted by the memory of Astra, whose guilt is still stuck over him after nine years.

=== Arrow ===
Constantine first appears on the Arrowverse on Arrow in the show's fourth season. In flashbacks, Oliver Queen meets Constantine during his fourth year away from Star City when he assists Constantine in retrieving a magical artifact from Lian Yu. In the present, Constantine assists Oliver in performing a "reverse exorcism" to restore the soul of the recently resurrected Sara Lance. Later, Oliver mentions that Constantine has gone to Hell; after returning, John puts Oliver in touch with Esrin Fortuna.

=== Legends of Tomorrow ===
Constantine returns in the third season of Legends of Tomorrow, when he offers the team advice on dealing with the supernatural as they hunt the demon Mallus, whose other-dimensional prison has been weakened after the Legends were forced to interfere in their own history to stop the Legion of Doom. After the Legends defeat Mallus by deliberately breaking his prison open so that they can confront him directly, Constantine reveals that their actions have unleashed a wave of exorcised demons and other supernatural monsters.

In the fourth season, he joins the team as their magical expert as they hunt the new monsters across history, but it is revealed that he is on the run from a supernatural creature hunting him as a consequence of his past actions. During a visit to 1970s London, he finds his parents' pub and attempts to prevent his own birth to save his mother's life, but the timeline automatically prevents him doing so. Constantine attempts to use time travel to change history to save the life of Desmond, a former lover who sacrificed himself to save Constantine from the demon Neron, but when this creates increasingly twisted timelines, Constantine accepts the need to restore the original timeline and comes clean to the rest of the team about his issue with Neron. Constantine eventually manages to save Desmond by luring Neron out of his body. However, when Neron takes control of his Legends teammate Ray Palmer, Constantine enters hell in order to save him. In hell, Constantine meets Astra, who has grown up and refuses to be saved by him. After recovering Ray's soul, Constantine tricks Neron into breaking his own word (Neron had promised that he would not hurt Ray's friend Nate Heywood and Nate fought Neron while in disguise), forcing the demon out of Ray's body, before finally killing him.

In season five, following the end of the Crisis, Constantine works against an adult Astra Logue, who accelerated his upcoming death by lung cancer. He searches for the Loom of Fate, hoping to rewrite reality in order to give Astra and her mother, Natalie, happier lives. Constantine also begins a relationship with Zari Tarazi.

In season six, Constantine's magical abilities are sacrificed in order to stop Aleister Crowley. He searches for the Fountain of Imperium in hopes of regaining them, but to no avail. He comes across magical potions that temporarily grant him bizarre power, and becomes addicted to them despite the deadly effects on his health. Although Zari convinces Constantine to turn his life around, he is taken over by his "dark side" and works with Bishop to link with the Fountain. However, Bishop anticipates a betrayal from Constantine and poisons him, destroying the Fountain. He dies at Astra's and Zari's side, apologizing for his misdeeds. He is able to return from Hell, but remains damned. He parts ways with Zari.

=== Crossovers ===
During the crossover event "Crisis on Infinite Earths", Constantine assists Sara, Barry Allen, and Mia Smoak resurrect a deceased Oliver using a Lazarus Pit on Earth-18 in North Dakota during the time of the Old West. It is revealed that he has multiversal knowledge. However, the presence of the antimatter wave causes the pillars of sorcery to tumble, weakening him and preventing him from restoring Oliver's soul, as he did with Sara's. As a last resort, he takes Mia and John Diggle to Earth-666 where Lucifer Morningstar helps them get into Purgatory to save Oliver's soul. There, Constantine encounters the Earth-666 doppelganger of Jim Corrigan, who transfers the powers of the Spectre to Oliver for him to use to save the Multiverse. As a result, the trio return to Earth-1 in failure and Constantine and the other heroes are killed by a wave of antimatter while the Paragons are sent to the Vanishing Point to regroup and prepare for their battle against the Anti-Monitor.

== Other versions ==
- In Constantine, John faces Furcifer, a demon who took his appearance. He stalks Liv Aberdine and blackmails John by using Astra. However, they send him back to Hell.
- In the fourth season of Legends of Tomorrow, Constantine meets King Kon-sten-tyn, his 1st century BCE ancestor and the progenitor of his magical bloodline.

== Creation and development ==
=== Constantine ===
A TV adaptation starring John Constantine was first announced on September 26, 2013. The series would be developed by Daniel Cerone and David S. Goyer, and air on NBC. Welsh actor Matt Ryan was cast as Constantine on February 21, 2014. According to Goyer, Constantine's portrayal on the show would stick closer to the source material than the 2005 feature film did, which included portraying the character as blonde and British. According to pilot episode director Neil Marshall, Constantine would not be allowed to smoke on the show due to network restrictions, though the character was shown to smoke on the show itself. A decision not to explore Constantine's bisexuality in the show caused some consternation with fans, although the character continued to be portrayed as bisexual in the comics. Despite a positive reaction from fans, poor ratings led to the show being cancelled after thirteen episodes.

=== Arrowverse ===
In August 2015, it was announced that Ryan would appear as Constantine on Arrow in the fourth season episode "Haunted", per a "one-time-only" deal." Season four co-showrunner Wendy Mericle confirmed that this version of Constantine would be the same character that had appeared in the NBC series.

Ryan's involvement on Legends of Tomorrow was first announced on October 9, 2017, to appear in a two-part arc during the show's third season; specifically, episodes 9 and 10. According to executive producer Phil Klemmer, having Ryan reprise his "iconic [and] legendary role" is something that he and Marc Guggenheim had been working toward since the show's first season. Regarding Constantine's inclusion on the show, Klemmer stated that "an alienated, chain-smoking, bisexual, world-weary demonologist would feel right at home among our Legends". Ryan was promoted to series regular for the fourth season of Legends of Tomorrow. Ryan spoke to the relationship between the character seen in the NBC series and the one seen on Legends of Tomorrow and in the Arrowverse. He said the two were the same character with "the same DNA", and likened each appearance to that of different comic book writers and artists working with the character: "He has the same outline, but he looks different. The hair is slightly different. He has a slightly different cadence sometimes. Different artists and different writers write him in different ways." Ryan also noted that while the fourth season of Legends of Tomorrow mentions the Astra storyline from the NBC series, it would not explore the Brujeria storyline, though Constantine "still carries that baggage around with him". However the fifth season did continue the story line leading to Astra joining the Legends. Constantine ceased to appear in the Arrowverse after the sixth season of Legends of Tomorrow as Warner Bros terminated the series' access to the character.

== Reception ==
Matt Ryan's portrayal of Constantine was received positively from fans, critics and audience. This popularity led many to ask a renewal and second season of his cancelled self-titled show.

== See also ==
- Constantine, unrelated 2005 film starring Keanu Reeves as the title character.
- DC Animated Movie Universe, separate DC universe in which John Constantine plays a major role, along with Matt Ryan returning as his character.
- Constantine: City of Demons, a web-series turned into a film set in the DCAMU after originally supposed be a continuation of the Constantine series.
- Season 7 of Legends of Tomorrow, the series's last season with Matt Ryan returning but playing a new character Gwyn Davies.
- "It's a Swamp Thing", episode of Harley Quinn (TV series) where Matt Ryan reprised his role.
