= Olivia Swann =

British actress (b.1992)

- Born: Olivia Charlotte Swann; 19 September 1992 (age 34); Lewisham, London, England
- Education: East 15 Acting School
- Occupation: Actress
- Years active: 2018–present

Olivia Charlotte Swann (born 19 September 1992) is an English actress. She is known for her roles as Astra Logue in the CW science fiction series DC's Legends of Tomorrow (2018–2022) and as Michelle Mackey in the Paramount+ series NCIS: Sydney (2024–).

== Early life ==
Olivia was born in Lewisham, South London and grew up in Birmingham. She described herself as a "painfully shy child who kept to herself." She began taking acting classes at age 12 and then studied at the East 15 Acting School.

== Career ==
Swann's television career began with an appearance in the BBC One medical soap opera Doctors in 2018, in which she played Karinna Hailes. She gained wider recognition when she joined the cast of DC's Legends of Tomorrow on the CW in 2019 as a guest star in season four. She was promoted to a series regular in season five.

In 2023, Swann starred in the film River Wild alongside Leighton Meester and Adam Brody. She played the role of Karissa in the film, a thriller about a whitewater rafting trip gone wrong.

Also in 2023, Swann originated the role of NCIS special agent Michelle Mackey in the Paramount+ series NCIS: Sydney, a spin-off of the long-running series NCIS, and the fifth installment in the NCIS franchise.

== Filmography ==
=== Film ===
Year	Title	Role	Notes
2022	Together, Alone	May	Short Film
2023	River Wild	Karissa	

=== Television ===
Year	Title	Role	Notes
2018–2022	DC's Legends of Tomorrow	Astra Logue	Recurring role (season 4); Main role (seasons 5-7); 33 episodes
2018	Doctors	Karinna Hailes	Episode: "Scar Tissue"
2023–present	NCIS: Sydney	Michelle Mackey	Main role
2023	The Break	Bec	Episode: "Wolverine Woman"

=== Theatre ===
Year	Title	Role	Director	Producer
2018	Dracula	Mina Murray	Eduard Lewis	UK Tour
TBA	Three Sisters	Masha	Philip Weaver	East 15
TBA	The House of Spass (Brecht)	Cabaret Dancer / Ensemble	Philip Weaver	East 15
TBA	Hamlet	Gertrude	Jeremy Mortimer	East 15
TBA	The Long Weekend	Wynn	Philip Weaver	East 15 / Tristan Bates Theatre
