= Kevin Mock =

American film director

- Occupations: Television and film director, editor, producer
- Years active: 1995–present

Kevin Mock is an American television director, editor, and producer who is well known for his work on The WB/CW's America's Next Top Model.

== Career ==
Mock got his start as a production assistant on Art Camacho's The Power Within in 1995. He first worked in editing on the Anna Nicole Smith starrer To the Limit, as an assistant. His first edited feature was 1996s Tiger Heart, directed by George Chamchoum. He then went on to join television with TNT's L.A. Heat. He served as associate producer, and eventually co-producer, and editor until the series' conclusion in 1999.

In 2003, he joined the crew of Tyra Banks' reality competition series America's Next Top Model. Mock would go on to serve in the capacities of creative consultant, editor, co-producer and segment director. He was an integral part of the show until his departure after the 13th cycle. He ultimately edited 24 episodes and co-produced 94.

He has edited for such series as Stylista, Breaking In, Cult, Forever and Teen Wolf. In recent years, he has segued to directing and helming three episodes of The CW's Hart of Dixie. Mock has only edited and directed two series in his career, the first being NBC's spy comedy Chuck, and the second being The CW's superhero team-up series DC's Legends of Tomorrow. Both series were showrunned/executive produced by Phil Klemmer and Chris Fedak, who brought Mock on board.

=== Legends of Tomorrow ===
While Mock started as an editor on the show. In an interview he claimed that he was looking for work and Phil Klemmer was the person who offered him the episode Moonshot. Mock then went on to directed eleven more episodes of Legends of Tomorrow including the series finale, Knocked Down, Knocked Up.

== Filmography ==
Year	Title	Credited As			Notes
Year	Title	Director	Editor	Producer	Notes
2003-2009	Americas Next Top Model	Yes	Yes	Yes	Editor 2003-2006 (24 ep.) Director 2007-2009 (21 ep.)
2011	Chuck	Yes	Yes		Editor 2007-2012 (28 ep.) Director 2011 ep: Chuck Versus the A-Team
2013-2015	Teen Wolf		Yes		Editor 2013-2015 (3 ep.)
2016-2022	Legends of Tomorrow	Yes	Yes	Yes	Editor 2016-2018 (13 ep.) Director 2017-2022 (12 ep.) Also producing director
2018	The Flash	Yes			Director 2018 ep: Harry and the Harrisons
