= Amy Pemberton =

British actress

- Born: Amy Louise Pemberton; Stowmarket, Suffolk, England
- Occupation: Actress
- Years active: 2004–present

Amy Louise Pemberton is a British actress. She portrayed Gideon in the television series Legends of Tomorrow and voiced Elaena Glenmore in the Game of Thrones video game. She voiced Slone from Titanfall 2 (2016), and played Private Sally Morgan—a companion of the Seventh Doctor—in Big Finish Productions' Doctor Who audio plays.

== Personal life ==
Pemberton is from Stowmarket, Suffolk.

== Filmography ==
=== Film ===
| Year | Title | Role | Notes |
|---|---|---|---|
| 2005 | Anomaly | Tea Kelly | Short film |
| 2006 | What Are the Chances | Lara | Short film |
| 2012 | Storage 24 | Lucy | |
| 2015 | Doomsday | Cassie | |
| 2016 | Tom and Jerry: Back to Oz | Dorothy / The Mouse Queen | Direct-to-video. Singing voice (Dorothy) |
| 2016 | Azure | Nancy Cole | Short film |
| 2017 | Abe | Alexandria | Short film |
| 2017 | Kaufman's Game | The Girl | |
| 2018 | Chrononaut | Cassandra | |
| 2019 | Sisters | Amy | Short film |
| 2019 | Eleven Eleven | Ramen | Voice role |
| 2019 | The Laundromat | Fetching | |
| 2019 | If Only You Were Free | Maggie | Short film; also associate producer |
| 2020 | Sergio | News Reporter | |
| 2023 | How to Die | Molly | Short film |
| 2026 | Scream 7 | Deputy Cooke | |
| TBA | America | News Reporter | Short film. Post-production |

=== Television ===
| Year | Title | Role | Notes |
|---|---|---|---|
| 2004 | The Mysti Show | Snowdrop | 12 episodes |
| 2004 | Woolamaloo | Bonny | Unknown episodes |
| 2005 | The Basil Brush Show | Hollywood Molly | Episode: "Basil the Movie" |
| 2005 | My Parents Are Aliens | Louise | Episode: "Worst Aid" |
| 2006 | The Commander | Sadie Carr | Episode: "Blacklight (Parts One & Two)" |
| 2006 | Grownups | Alison | Episode: "Reflectomoz" |
| 2007 | Casualty | Jodie Daley | Episode: "Strangers When We Meet" |
| 2008 | Doctors | Gemma Steedman | Episode: "Family Ties" |
| 2011 | Odd One In | Fake Australian | Episode: #2.2 |
| 2014 | Doc McStuffins | Florence Nightingale | Episode: "Let the Nightingale Sing". Singing voice (Florence) |
| 2016 | Doc McStuffins | Fiona | Episode: "St. Patrick's Day Dilemma / A Giant Save". Voice role |
| 2016–2019 | Suspense | Various roles | 7 episodes |
| 2016–2022 | Adventures in Odyssey | Renee Carter | Recurring voice role; 4 episodes |
| 2016–2022 | Legends of Tomorrow | Gideon | Main voice role (season 1–6). Main role (season 7) |
| 2016 | Arrow | Gideon | Episode: "Invasion!". Voice role |
| 2017 | Scorpion | MI6 Agent Gemma Franklin | Episode: "Go with the Flo(rence)" |
| 2021 | Dota: Dragon's Blood | Adara / Elven Child #4 | Episode: "Neverwhere Land". Voice role |
| 2021 | Her Pen Pal | Nathalie Moore | Television film |
| 2021 | Ridley Jones | Lemur Mom | Episode: "Ridley's Babysitter Club / Riddle Me This". Voice role |
| 2023 | A Pinch of Portugal | Hope | Television film |
| 2024 | Eric | Dana | Mini-series; episode 4 |
| 2024 | Curfew | Sian Williams | 6 episodes |
| 2026 | Missing the Boat | Emily Andrews | Television film |

=== Video games ===
| Year | Title | Role | Notes |
|---|---|---|---|
| 2013 | Marvel Heroes | Lady Loki / Sif | Voice |
| 2014 | Game of Thrones | Elaena Glenmore | Voice |
| 2016 | Uncharted 4: A Thief's End | Additional voices | Voice |
| 2016 | Titanfall 2 | Slone | Voice |
| 2017 | Fortnite | Penny | Voice |
| 2017 | Dropzone | Vanguard | Voice |
| 2020 | Call of Duty: Black Ops Cold War | Elizabeth Grey | Voice |
| 2023 | Hogwarts Legacy | Calliope Snelling / Bella Navarro / Agnes Coffey | Voice |
| 2023 | Starfield | Jane Weller | Voice |
| 2023 | Call of Duty: Modern Warfare III | Elizabeth Grey / Additional voices | Voice |

=== Theatre ===
| Year | Title | Role | Notes |
|---|---|---|---|
| 2006 | Footloose | Ariel | Novello Theatre |
| 2008–2009 | Jersey Boys | Lorraine | Prince Edward Theatre |
| 2011 | Rock of Ages | Sherrie | Shaftesbury Theatre |

=== Audio plays ===
| Year | Title | Role | Notes |
|---|---|---|---|
| 2011 | House of Blue Fire | Sally Morgan | Doctor Who: The Monthly Range |
| 2012 | Black and White | Sally Morgan | Doctor Who: The Monthly Range |
| 2012 | Project: Nirvana | Sally Morgan | Doctor Who: The Companion Chronicles |
| 2012 | Gods and Monsters | Sally Morgan | Doctor Who: The Monthly Range |
| 2013 | Afterlife | Sally Morgan | Doctor Who: The Monthly Range |
| 2014 | Signs and Wonders | Sally Morgan | Doctor Who: The Monthly Range |
