= Matt Ryan (actor) =

Welsh actor (born 1981)

- Ryan at GalaxyCon San Jose in 2026
- Born: Matthew Darren Evans; 11 April 1981 (age 45); Swansea, Wales
- Education: Bristol Old Vic Theatre School
- Occupation: Actor
- Years active: 2001–present

Matthew Darren Evans (born 11 April 1981), known professionally as Matt Ryan, is a Welsh screen, voice, and stage actor. He is known for portraying Edward Kenway in the video game Assassin's Creed IV: Black Flag and its remake, portraying FBI agent Mick Rawson in Criminal Minds: Suspect Behavior, John Constantine in NBC's Constantine and The CW's Arrowverse, as well as voicing the character in the DC Animated Movie Universe and its spin-off web series Constantine: City of Demons.

== Early life ==
Ryan was born in Swansea, Wales, as Matthew Darren Evans, the son of Steve and Maria Evans. He attended Penyrheol Comprehensive School before moving on to Gorseinon College, where he completed a BTEC Performing Arts course. He graduated from the Bristol Old Vic in 2003 and joined the Royal Shakespeare Company in 2004.

== Career ==
When he was 10, Ryan appeared as Gavroche in the West End production of Les Misérables. He played Mick Rawson on the CBS series Criminal Minds: Suspect Behavior, a character that had been introduced in the Criminal Minds episode "The Fight".

In 2013, he performed the voice and motion capture of Edward Kenway in Ubisoft Montreal's video game Assassin's Creed IV: Black Flag. In February 2014, it was announced that Ryan was cast as John Constantine in NBC's pilot for Constantine, starring in all 13 episodes of the series' only season. He reprised his role in a crossover episode of The CW's Arrow, as well as the 2017 animated film Justice League Dark. On 8 January 2017, The CW announced an animated series, Constantine: City of Demons, on the CW Seed app, with Ryan confirmed to voice Constantine once again. Ryan later reprised the role in Legends of Tomorrow, initially appearing in several episodes of the third season, before he was promoted to series regular for the fourth season.

In the 2015 production of Helen Edmundson's adaptation of Thérèse Raquin at the Roundabout Theater at Studio 54, Ryan played Laurent opposite Keira Knightley, Judith Light, and Gabriel Ebert. In August 2017, he appeared on stage at the Donmar Warehouse in the play Knives in Hens by David Harrower and directed by Yaël Farber.

In 2026, Ryan reprised his role as Edward Kenway in Assassin's Creed Black Flag Resynced, a remake of the 2013 video game, and hosted its worldwide reveal showcase.

== Filmography ==
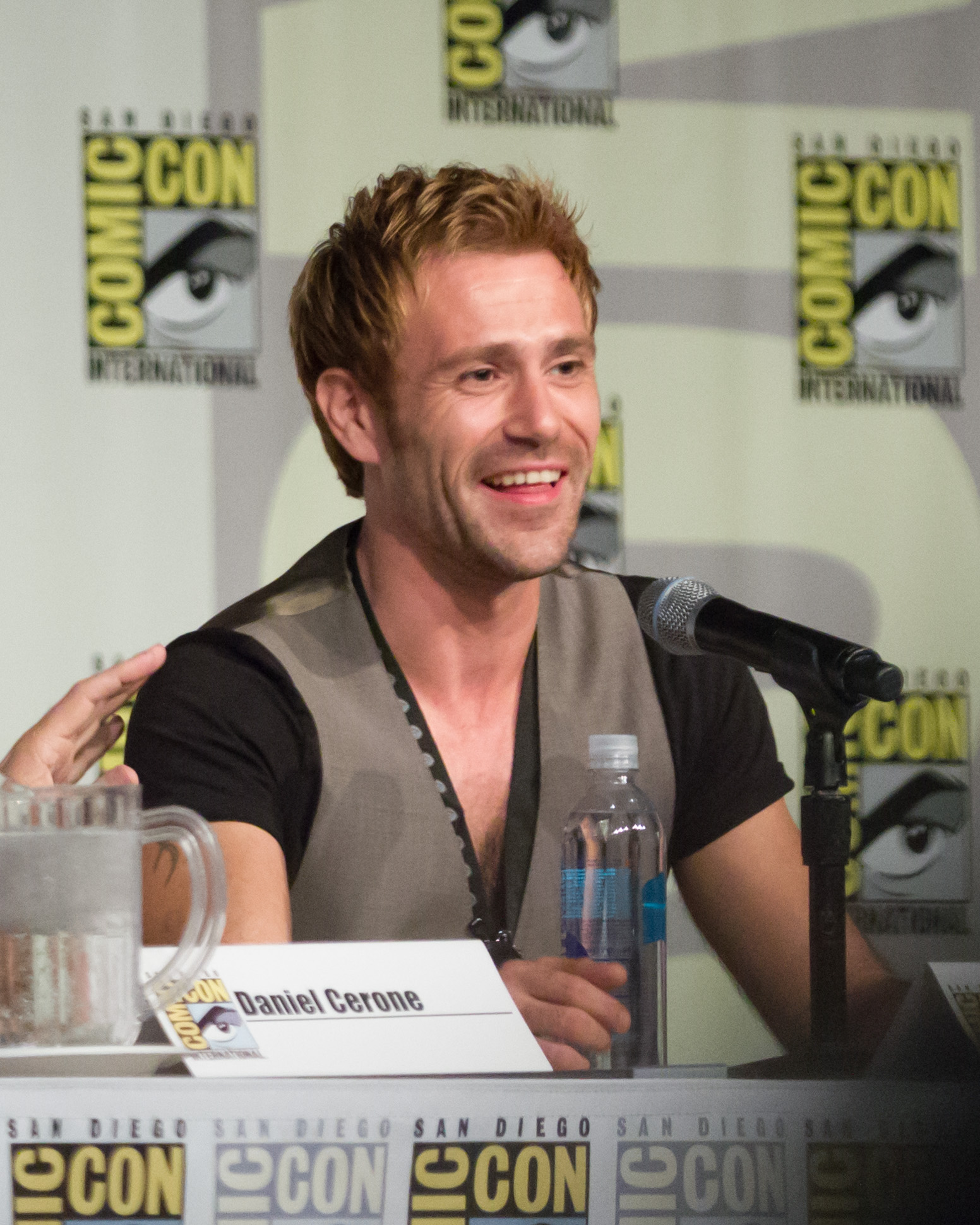
Ryan at San Diego Comic-Con in 2014

=== Film ===
Year	Title	Role	Notes
2002	Pocket Money	Johnny	Short film
2004	Layer Cake	Junkie 2	
2007	Blood Monkey	Seth	Direct-to-video
2008	Miss Pettigrew Lives for a Day	Gerry	
2011	Flypaper	Rupert Gates	
2013	Armistice	Edward Sterling	
2014	Heart of Lightness	Stranger	
2014	500 Miles North	John Hogg	
2015	John Con Noir	John Constantine (voice)	Short film
2016	Away	Dex	
2017	Justice League Dark	John Constantine (voice)	
2018	Constantine: City of Demons – The Movie	John Constantine / Constantine Demons (voice)	
2020	Adverse	Jake	
2020	Justice League Dark: Apokolips War	John Constantine (voice)	
2022	Constantine: The House of Mystery	John Constantine (voice)	Short film
2024	Justice League: Crisis on Infinite Earths	John Constantine (voice)	
TBA	Outsider	TBA	Pre-production

=== Television ===
Year	Title	Role	Notes
2001	Nuts and Bolts	Gilly	
2004	Mine All Mine	Tonker	2 episodes
2007	The Tudors	Richard Pace	3 episodes
2007	Consenting Adults	Charley Bullard	Television film
2008	Torchwood	Dale	Episode: "Meat"
2008	HolbyBlue	Frankie	Season 2, episode 7
2009	Wild Decembers	Bugler	Television film
2009	Collision	Dave Brown	Miniseries; 5 episodes
2010	Criminal Minds	Mick Rawson	Episode: "The Fight"
2011	Criminal Minds: Suspect Behavior	Mick Rawson	
2014–2015	Constantine	John Constantine	Main role; 13 episodes
2015	Arrow	John Constantine	Episode: "Haunted"
2017	The Halcyon	Joe O'Hara	Main role; 8 episodes
2017–2022	Legends of Tomorrow	John Constantine	Recurring role (season 3); main role (season 4–season 6); 47 episodes
2017–2022	Legends of Tomorrow	Gwyn Davies	Main role (season 7); 9 episodes
2018–2019	Constantine: City of Demons	John Constantine / Constantine Demons (voice)	Web series; main role
2019	Batwoman	John Constantine	Episode: "Crisis on Infinite Earths Part Two"
2019	The Flash	John Constantine	Episode: "Crisis on Infinite Earths Part Three"
2022	Harley Quinn	John Constantine	Episode: "It's a Swamp Thing"; voice role

=== Theatre ===
Play	Year	Role	Theatre	Director
Small Change	2008	Gerard	Donmar Warehouse	Peter Gill
Hamlet	2009	Horatio	Donmar production at the Wyndham's Theatre	Michael Grandage
Look Back in Anger	2012	Cliff	Royal Court Theatre	Polly Stenham
The Tempest	2012	Caliban	Theatre Royal, Bath	Adrian Noble
Henry V	2014	Fluellen	Noël Coward Theatre	Michael Grandage
Therese Raquin	2015	Laurent	Roundabout Theatre, Broadway	Evan Cabnet
Knives in Hens	2017	Gilbert	Donmar Warehouse	Yaël Farber

=== Video games ===
Year	Title	Role	Notes
2013	Assassin's Creed IV: Black Flag	Edward Kenway	Voice and motion capture
2026	Assassin's Creed Black Flag Resynced	Edward Kenway	Voice and motion capture
