= David Geddes (cinematographer) =

Canadian cinematographer

David A. Geddes (born 1949 in Vancouver, British Columbia) is a Canadian cinematographer.

== Life ==
David Geddes studied at Banff School of Fine Arts, the Northern Alberta Institute of Technology and the Simon Fraser University.

He started his career with documentaries and independent short films. In the late 1980s he turned to TV and worked on series such as 21 Jump Street and Beverly Hills, 90210.

Geddes is a member of the Canadian Society of Cinematographers (CSC) and the American Society of Cinematographers (ASC).

His son Shane Geddes also works as a cinematographer.

== Selected filmography ==
- 1976: Post Partum Depression (documentary short)
- 1978: Family Down the Fraser (documentary short)
- 1979: What the Hell's Going on Up There? (documentary short)
- 1979: Horse Drawn Magic (documentary short)
- 1979: Bill Reid (documentary short)
- 1980: Big and the Blues (documentary short)
- 1980: A Visit from Captain Cook (documentary short)
- 1983: Jacks or Better (documentary short)
- 1984: Chemanius Blues
- 1985: Vancouver: The World in a City (documentary short)
- 1986: Coquihalla - Highway 5: 20 Months Through the Mountains (documentary short)
- 1986: British Columbia: The Rockies to the Pacific (documentary short)
- 1987: Trying Times (TV Series, 1 episode)
- 1987: World Drums
- 1987: At the Crossroads (documentary short)
- 1988–1990: 21 Jump Street (TV series, 41 episodes)
- 1989: The Beachcombers (TV series, 2 episodes)
- 1990–1991: Beverly Hills, 90210 (TV series, 10 episodes)
- 1991: John Wyre: Drawing on Sound (documentary short)
- 1992: In the Eyes of a Stranger (TV movie)
- 1992: Dirty Work (TV movie)
- 1992: Black Ice
- 1993: When a Stranger Calls Back (TV movie)
- 1993: Call of the Wild (TV movie)
- 1993: Blind Spot (TV movie)
- 1993: Ernest Rides Again
- 1994: I Know My Son Is Alive (TV movie)
- 1994: Ernest Goes to School
- 1994: MacGyver: Lost Treasure of Atlantis (TV movie)
- 1994: Tears and Laughter: The Joan and Melissa Rivers Story (TV movie)
- 1994: Incident at Deception Ridge (TV movie)
- 1994: Moment of Truth: Cult Rescue (TV movie)
- 1994: MacGyver: Trail to Doomsday (TV movie)
- 1995: Fighting for My Daughter (TV movie)
- 1995: Falling from the Sky: Flight 174 (TV movie)
- 1995: Deadlocked: Escape from Zone 14 (TV movie)
- 1995: Slam Dunk Ernest
- 1995: The Colony (TV movie)
- 1996: Harvey (TV movie)
- 1996: Have You Seen My Son (TV movie)
- 1996: Deadly Web (TV movie)
- 1996: Kidz in the Wild (TV movie)
- 1996: Sweet Dreams (TV movie)
- 1996: Sudden Terror: The Hijacking of School Bus #17 (TV movie)
- 1996: The Angel of Pennsylvania Avenue (TV movie)
- 1997: Bridge of Time (TV movie)
- 1997: Killing Mr. Griffin (TV movie)
- 1997: A Call to Remember (TV movie)
- 1997: Married to a Stranger (TV movie)
- 1998: Baby Monitor: Sound of Fear (TV movie)
- 1998: My Husband's Secret Life (TV movie)
- 1998: Every Mother's Worst Fear (TV movie)
- 1998: CHiPs '99 (TV movie)
- 1998: Don't Look Down (TV movie)
- 1999: Fatal Error (TV movie)
- 1999: Dying to Live (TV movie)
- 1999: Shadow Warriors II: Hunt for the Death Merchant (TV movie)
- 1999: Y2K (TV movie)
- 2000: Here's to Life!
- 2000: Frankie & Hazel (TV movie)
- 2000: Rocky Times (TV movie)
- 2001: Inside the Osmonds (TV movie)
- 2001: Ladies and the Champ (TV movie)
- 2001: Kevin of the North
- 2001–2002: Dark Angel (TV series, 31 episodes)
- 2002: Halloween: Resurrection
- 2002–2003: John Doe (TV series, 2 episodes)
- 2003–2004: Jake 2.0 (TV series, 4 episodes)
- 2004: Sudbury (TV movie)
- 2005: Point Pleasant (TV series)
- 2005: Nearing Grace
- 2005: A Simple Curve
- 2006: The Evidence (TV series, 8 episodes)
- 2006–2008: Men in Trees (TV series, 35 episodes)
- 2007: The Messengers
- 2008–2009: Sanctuary (TV series, 7 episodes)
- 2010: Night and Day (TV movie)
- 2010: Smokin' Aces 2: Assassins' Ball
- 2010: Tucker & Dale vs. Evil
- 2010: Life Unexpected (TV series, 12 episodes)
- 2010–2011: Lie to Me (TV series, 5 episodes)
- 2011: Red Riding Hood: The Tale Begins (short)
- 2011–2013: Fringe (TV series, 13 episodes)
- 2013–2014: Almost Human (TV series, 7 episodes)
- 2014: Under the Dome (TV series, 12 episodes)
- 2015: The Last Ship (TV series, 6 episodes)
- 2016-21: Legends of Tomorrow (TV series, 15 episodes)
