= Phil Klemmer =

American television writer and producer

- Occupation(s): Television writer, producer
- Years active: 2001–present

Phil Klemmer is an American television writer and producer. He is known for his work on UPN's Veronica Mars, the NBC series Chuck, and The CW series Legends of Tomorrow.

== Early life ==
Klemmer grew up in Winchester, Virginia being kept from media outlets, including most television, saying, "...at a certain point my parents tried to brainwash me into thinking that television was evil. So then I didn't really watch television for the rest of my childhood. I read books and it was terrible. It wasn't until I really was working in entertainment that I actually bought a television and started watching things, so I had a lot of catching up to do." He majored in Classics in college; stating Indiana Jones as being influential in that decision.

== Career ==
=== Early career ===
He began his career as an assistant to director Michel Gondry, on his 2001 comedy Human Nature; as well as serving as cinematographer on Gondry's The Work of Director Michel Gondry. In 2005, he was hired as a story editor on the Kristen Bell fronted series Veronica Mars. He would later go on to serve as executive story editor, writing for fifteen episodes over the course of the shows run.

In 2007, he joined the new NBC series Chuck, as producer and writer. It revolved around a hapless computer nerd that inadvertently downloads top-secret info into his brain, and is then exploited by the government. Klemmer rose to be supervising producer, then co-executive producer for the series' last two seasons. He contributed to a total of 14 episodes. While simultaneously holding his position on Chuck, Klemmer also became a co-executive producer and writer for the short lived J. J. Abrams produced espionage drama Undercovers. Writing episodes "Jailbreak" and "The Key to It All".

=== 2012–15 ===
After Chuck's conclusion, Klemmer joined the writing staff of Greg Berlanti's USA Network miniseries Political Animals; as well as serving as consulting producer. He contributed to installments "The Woman Problem" and "16 Hours". In 2013, he continued his relationship with producer Berlanti, co-executive producing, showrunning, and writing for CBS's Golden Boy. The series was canceled after one season. Next, he developed a reboot of the British series The Tomorrow People for Berlanti and The CW. And the next season, joined the ABC drama Forever, created by Matt Miller, as showrunner and consulting producer. Both shows were cancelled by their respective networks after one season.

=== Legends of Tomorrow ===
In 2015, Klemmer was brought on the Arrow and The Flash spin-off, Legends of Tomorrow as executive producer and showrunner by creator Berlanti. The series follows a ragtag crew of heroes and villains who travel through time attempting to foil the maniacal Vandal Savage. When speaking about running the series Klemmer stated, "I really think that seeing Clash of the Titans when I was a little kid...I think that the reason I became a Classics major was because of Indiana Jones. And doing this show, which has that intersection of Vandal Savage...that is my sweet spot, where its history mixed up with the mystical, mixed up with...time?"

== Filmography ==
=== Film ===
Title	Year	Notes
Human Nature	2001	Director assistant

=== Television ===
The numbers in writing credits refer to the number of episodes.

Key
†	Denotes television series that have not yet aired.

Title	Year	Credited as				Network	Notes
Title	Year	Creator	Producer	Writer	Executive producer	Network	Notes
Veronica Mars	2004–07	No	No	Yes (15)	No	UPN; The CW	Story editor (season 2); Executive story editor (season 3)
Chuck	2007–12	No	Yes	Yes (14)	No	NBC	Producer (season 1: 12 episodes); Supervising producer (season 2); Co-executive producer (season 3, season 4: 6 episodes, season 5: 10 episodes)
Undercovers	2010	No	No	Yes (2)	No	NBC	Co-executive producer
Political Animals	2012	No	No	Yes (2)	No	USA Network	Miniseries; Consulting producer (4 episodes)
Golden Boy	2013	No	No	Yes (2)	No	CBS	Co-executive producer (12 episodes)
The Tomorrow People	2013–14	Developer	No	Yes (7)	Yes	The CW	Executive producer (17 episodes)
Forever	2014–15	No	No	Yes (4)	No	ABC	Consulting producer (21 episodes)
Legends of Tomorrow	2015–22	Developer	No	Yes (23)	Yes	The CW	Showrunner
Beebo Saves Christmas	2021	No	No	No	Yes	The CW	Television special
The Company You Keep	2023	No	No	Yes	No	ABC	Writer; Episode: "A Sparkling Reputation"
