= List of Legends of Tomorrow episodes =

The series logo

Legends of Tomorrow is an American superhero television series created by Greg Berlanti, Marc Guggenheim, Phil Klemmer, and Andrew Kreisberg, which ran for seven seasons on The CW. Additionally, Klemmer, later joined by Keto Shimizu, served as showrunner. It is set in the Arrowverse, sharing continuity with other related television series. The series revolves around an eponymous team of superheroes and their time-traveling adventures.

The first season starred Victor Garber, Brandon Routh, Arthur Darvill. Caity Lotz, Franz Drameh, Ciara Renée, Falk Hentschel, Amy Pemberton, Dominic Purcell, and Wentworth Miller, many of whom has first appeared on the parent series Arrow and The Flash. At the conclusion of the season, Hentschel, Miller, and Renée departed the series. During the course of the series, 110 episodes of Legends of Tomorrow aired over seven seasons, between January 21, 2016, and March 2, 2022.

== Series overview ==
Legends of Tomorrow series overview
Season	Episodes	Originally released		Rank	Average viewership (in millions)
Season	Episodes	First released	Last released	Rank	Average viewership (in millions)
1	16	January 21, 2016	May 19, 2016	135	3.16
2	17	October 13, 2016	April 4, 2017	141	2.57
3	18	October 10, 2017	April 9, 2018	170	2.24
4	16	October 22, 2018	May 20, 2019	178	1.49
5 (Note: A total of 15 episodes were produced for the fifth season: a special episode for the "Crisis on Infinite Earths" crossover, which aired on January 14, 2020, before the season premiere, and another fourteen contributing towards the regular season, which officially premiered on January 21, 2020.)	Special	January 14, 2020		122	1.35
5	14	January 21, 2020	June 2, 2020	122	1.35
6	15	May 2, 2021	September 5, 2021	149	0.82
7	13	October 13, 2021	March 2, 2022	127	0.86

== Episodes ==
=== Season 1 (2016) ===
The first season of Legends of Tomorrow aired from January 21 through May 19, 2016.

Season one episodes
No. overall	No. in season	Title	Directed by	Written by	Original release date	Prod. code	U.S. viewers (millions)
1	1	"Pilot"	Glen Winter	Greg Berlanti & Marc Guggenheim & Andrew Kreisberg & Phil Klemmer	January 21, 2016	4X6351	3.21
2	2	"Pilot"	Glen Winter	Greg Berlanti & Marc Guggenheim & Andrew Kreisberg & Phil Klemmer	January 28, 2016	4X6352	2.89
3	3	"Blood Ties"	Dermott Downs	Marc Guggenheim & Chris Fedak	February 4, 2016	4X6353	2.32
4	4	"White Knights"	Antonio Negret	Sarah Nicole Jones & Phil Klemmer	February 7, 2016	4X6354	2.39
5	5	"Fail-Safe"	Dermott Downs	Beth Schwartz & Grainne Godfree	February 18, 2016	4X6355	2.25
6	6	"Star City 2046"	Steve Shill	Marc Guggenheim & Ray Utarnachitt	February 25, 2016	4X6356	2.47
7	7	"Marooned"	Gregory Smith	Anderson Mackenzie & Phil Klemmer	March 3, 2016	4X6357	2.28
8	8	"Night of the Hawk"	Joe Dante	Sarah Nicole Jones & Cortney Norris	March 10, 2016	4X6358	2.01
9	9	"Left Behind"	John F. Showalter	Beth Schwartz & Grainne Godfree	March 31, 2016	4X6359	1.97
10	10	"Progeny"	David Geddes	Phil Klemmer & Marc Guggenheim	April 7, 2016	4X6360	1.88
11	11	"The Magnificent Eight"	Thor Freudenthal	Story by : Greg Berlanti & Marc Guggenheim; Teleplay by : Marc Guggenheim	April 12, 2016 (Note: "The Magnificent Eight" premiered earlier in Canada on CTV before it premiered April 14 on the CW.)	4X6361	1.98
12	12	"Last Refuge"	Rachel Talalay	Chris Fedak & Matthew Maala	April 21, 2016	4X6362	1.78
13	13	"Leviathan"	Gregory Smith	Sarah Nicole Jones & Ray Utarnachitt	April 28, 2016	4X6363	1.86
14	14	"River of Time"	Alice Troughton	Cortney Norris & Anderson Mackenzie	May 5, 2016	4X6364	1.63
15	15	"Destiny"	Olatunde Osunsanmi	Story by : Marc Guggenheim; Teleplay by : Phil Klemmer & Chris Fedak	May 12, 2016	4X6365	1.89
16	16	"Legendary"	Dermott Downs	Story by : Greg Berlanti & Chris Fedak; Teleplay by : Phil Klemmer & Marc Guggenheim	May 19, 2016	4X6366	1.85

=== Season 2 (2016–17) ===
Season two episode
No. overall	No. in season	Title	Directed by	Written by	Original release date	Prod. code	U.S. viewers (millions)
17	1	"Out of Time"	Dermott Downs	Story by : Greg Berlanti & Chris Fedak; Teleplay by : Marc Guggenheim & Phil Klemmer	October 13, 2016	T13.20001	1.82
18	2	"The Justice Society of America"	Michael Grossman	Chris Fedak & Sarah Nicole Jones	October 20, 2016	T13.20002	1.80
19	3	"Shogun"	Kevin Tancharoen	Phil Klemmer & Grainne Godfree	October 27, 2016	T13.20003	1.75
20	4	"Abominations"	Michael Allowitz	Marc Guggenheim & Ray Utarnachitt	November 3, 2016	T13.20004	1.75
21	5	"Compromised"	David Geddes	Keto Shimizu & Grainne Godfree	November 10, 2016	T13.20005	1.77
22	6	"Outlaw Country"	Cherie Nowlan	Matthew Maala & Chris Fedak	November 17, 2016	T13.20006	1.85
23	7	"Invasion!"	Gregory Smith	Story by : Greg Berlanti; Teleplay by : Phil Klemmer & Marc Guggenheim	December 1, 2016	T13.20007	3.39
24	8	"The Chicago Way"	Ralph Hemecker	Sarah Nicole Jones & Ray Utarnachitt	December 8, 2016	T13.20008	2.00
25	9	"Raiders of the Lost Art"	Dermott Downs	Keto Shimizu & Chris Fedak	January 24, 2017	T13.20009	1.74
26	10	"The Legion of Doom"	Eric Laneuville	Phil Klemmer & Marc Guggenheim	January 31, 2017	T13.20010	1.78
27	11	"Turncoat"	Alice Troughton	Grainne Godfree & Matthew Maala	February 7, 2017	T13.20011	1.77
28	12	"Camelot/3000"	Antonio Negret	Anderson Mackenzie	February 21, 2017	T13.20012	1.64
29	13	"Land of the Lost"	Ralph Hemecker	Keto Shimizu & Ray Utarnachitt	March 7, 2017	T13.20013	1.54
30	14	"Moonshot"	Kevin Mock	Grainne Godfree	March 14, 2017	T13.20014	1.34
31	15	"Fellowship of the Spear"	Ben Bray	Keto Shimizu & Matthew Maala	March 21, 2017	T13.20015	1.72
32	16	"Doomworld"	Mairzee Almas	Ray Utarnachitt & Sarah Hernandez	March 28, 2017	T13.20016	1.59
33	17	"Aruba"	Rob Seidenglanz	Phil Klemmer & Marc Guggenheim	April 4, 2017	T13.20017	1.52

=== Season 3 (2017–18) ===
Season three episodes
No. overall	No. in season	Title	Directed by	Written by	Original release date	Prod. code	U.S. viewers (millions)
34	1	"Aruba-Con"	Rob Seidenglanz	Phil Klemmer & Marc Guggenheim	October 10, 2017	T13.20601	1.71
35	2	"Freakshow"	Kevin Tancharoen	Keto Shimizu & Grainne Godfree	October 17, 2017	T13.20602	1.58
36	3	"Zari"	Mairzee Almas	James Eagan & Ray Utarnachitt	October 24, 2017	T13.20603	1.43
37	4	"Phone Home"	Kevin Mock	Matthew Maala	October 31, 2017	T13.20604	1.38
38	5	"Return of the Mack"	Alexandra La Roche	Grainne Godfree & Morgan Faust	November 7, 2017	T13.20605	1.52
39	6	"Helen Hunt"	David Geddes	Keto Shimizu & Ubah Mohamed	November 14, 2017	T13.20606	1.53
40	7	"Welcome to the Jungle"	Mairzee Almas	Ray Utarnachitt & Tyron B. Carter	November 21, 2017	T13.20607	1.49
41	8	"Crisis on Earth-X, Part 4"	Gregory Smith	Story by : Marc Guggenheim & Andrew Kreisberg; Teleplay by : Phil Klemmer & Keto Shimizu	November 28, 2017	T13.20608	2.80
42	9	"Beebo the God of War"	Kevin Mock	Grainne Godfree & James Eagan	December 5, 2017	T13.20609	1.61
43	10	"Daddy Darhkest"	Dermott Downs	Keto Shimizu & Matthew Maala	February 12, 2018	T13.20610	1.51
44	11	"Here I Go Again"	Ben Bray	Ray Utarnachitt & Morgan Faust	February 19, 2018	T13.20611	1.40
45	12	"The Curse of the Earth Totem"	Chris Tammaro	Grainne Godfree & Ubah Mohamed	February 26, 2018	T13.20612	1.51
46	13	"No Country for Old Dads"	Viet Nguyen	Keto Shimizu & James Eagan	March 5, 2018	T13.20613	1.19
47	14	"Amazing Grace"	David Geddes	Matthew Maala & Tyron B. Carter	March 12, 2018	T13.20614	1.26
48	15	"Necromancing the Stone"	April Mullen	Grainne Godfree & Morgan Faust	March 19, 2018	T13.20615	1.25
49	16	"I, Ava"	Dean Choe	Ray Utarnachitt & Daphne Miles	March 26, 2018	T13.20616	1.28
50	17	"Guest Starring John Noble"	Ralph Hemecker	Keto Shimizu & James Eagan	April 2, 2018	T13.20617	1.23
51	18	"The Good, the Bad and the Cuddly"	Dermott Downs	Marc Guggenheim & Phil Klemmer	April 9, 2018	T13.20618	1.41

=== Season 4 (2018–19) ===
Season four episodes
No. overall	No. in season	Title	Directed by	Written by	Original release date	Prod. code	U.S. viewers (millions)
52	1	"The Virgin Gary"	Gregory Smith	Phil Klemmer & Grainne Godfree	October 22, 2018	T13.21051	1.00
53	2	"Witch Hunt"	Kevin Mock	Keto Shimizu & Matthew Maala	October 29, 2018	T13.21052	0.94
54	3	"Dancing Queen"	Kristin Windell	James Eagan & Morgan Faust	November 5, 2018	T13.21053	0.86
55	4	"Wet Hot American Bummer"	David Geddes	Ray Utarnachitt & Tyron B. Carter	November 12, 2018	T13.21054	0.90
56	5	"Tagumo Attacks!!!"	Alexandra La Roche	Keto Shimizu & Ubah Mohamed	November 19, 2018	T13.21055	0.91
57	6	"Tender Is the Nate"	Dean Choe	Phil Klemmer & Matthew Maala	November 26, 2018	T13.21056	0.97
58	7	"Hell No, Dolly!"	April Mullen	Grainne Godfree & Morgan Faust	December 3, 2018	T13.21057	0.93
59	8	"Legends of To-Meow-Meow"	Ben Bray	James Eagan & Ray Utarnachitt	December 10, 2018	T13.21058	1.10
60	9	"Lucha de Apuestas"	Andrew Kasch	Keto Shimizu & Tyron B. Carter	April 1, 2019	T13.21059	0.92
61	10	"The Getaway"	Viet Nguyen	Matthew Maala & Ubah Mohamed	April 8, 2019	T13.21060	0.95
62	11	"Séance and Sensibility"	Alexandra La Roche	Grainne Godfree & Jackie Canino	April 15, 2019	T13.21061	0.98
63	12	"The Eggplant, the Witch & the Wardrobe"	Mairzee Almas	Morgan Faust & Daphne Miles	April 22, 2019	T13.21062	0.85
64	13	"Egg MacGuffin"	Chris Tammaro	James Eagan & Tyron B. Carter	April 29, 2019	T13.21063	0.91
65	14	"Nip/Stuck"	David A. Geddes	Ray Utarnachitt & Matthew Maala	May 6, 2019	T13.21064	0.94
66	15	"Terms of Service"	April Mullen	Grainne Godfree & Ubah Mohamed	May 13, 2019	T13.21065	0.99
67	16	"Hey, World!"	Kevin Mock	Phil Klemmer & Keto Shimizu	May 20, 2019	T13.21066	1.05

=== Season 5 (2020) ===
Legends of Tomorrow, season 5 episodes
No. overall	No. in season	Title	Directed by	Written by	Original release date	Prod. code	U.S. viewers (millions)
Special
68	–	"Crisis on Infinite Earths: Part Five"	Gregory Smith	Keto Shimizu & Ubah Mohamed	January 14, 2020	T13.21908	1.35
Season
69	1	"Meet the Legends"	Kevin Mock	Grainne Godfree & James Eagan	January 21, 2020	T13.21901	0.72
70	2	"Miss Me, Kiss Me, Love Me"	David Geddes	Ray Utarnachitt	February 4, 2020	T13.21902	0.77
71	3	"Slay Anything"	Alexandra La Roche	Matthew Maala & Tyron B. Carter	February 11, 2020	T13.21903	0.74
72	4	"A Head of Her Time"	Avi Youabian	Morgan Faust	February 18, 2020	T13.21904	0.72
73	5	"Mortal Khanbat"	Caity Lotz	Grainne Godfree & Mark Bruner	February 25, 2020	T13.21905	0.74
74	6	"Mr. Parker's Cul-De-Sac"	Ben Hernandez Bray	Keto Shimizu & James Eagan	March 10, 2020	T13.21906	0.73
75	7	"Romeo v Juliet: Dawn of Justness"	Alexandra La Roche	Ray Utarnachitt & Matthew Maala	March 17, 2020	T13.21907	0.67
76	8	"Zari, Not Zari"	Kevin Mock	Morgan Faust & Tyron B. Carter	April 21, 2020	T13.21909	0.65
77	9	"The Great British Fake Off"	David A. Geddes	Jackie Canino	April 28, 2020	T13.21910	0.69
78	10	"Ship Broken"	Andi Armaganian	James Eagan & Mark Bruner	May 5, 2020	T13.21911	0.72
79	11	"Freaks and Greeks"	Nico Sachse	Matthew Maala & Ubah Mohamed	May 12, 2020	T13.21912	0.66
80	12	"I Am Legends"	Andrew Kasch	Ray Utarnachitt & Leah Poulliot & Emily Cheever	May 19, 2020	T13.21913	0.80
81	13	"The One Where We're Trapped on TV"	Marc Guggenheim	Grainne Godfree & James Eagan	May 26, 2020	T13.21914	0.76
82	14	"Swan Thong"	Kevin Mock	Keto Shimizu & Morgan Faust	June 2, 2020	T13.21915	0.73

=== Season 6 (2021) ===
Season six episodes
No. overall	No. in season	Title	Directed by	Written by	Original release date	Prod. code	U.S. viewers (millions)
83	1	"Ground Control to Sara Lance"	Kevin Mock	James Eagan & Mark Bruner	May 2, 2021	T13.22551	0.44
84	2	"Meat: The Legends"	Rachel Talalay	Matthew Maala & Morgan Faust	May 9, 2021	T13.22552	0.47
85	3	"The Ex-Factor"	David A. Geddes	Grainne Godfree & Tyron B. Carter	May 16, 2021	T13.22553	0.38
86	4	"Bay of Squids"	Sudz Sutherland	Phil Klemmer	May 23, 2021	T13.22554	0.42
87	5	"The Satanist's Apprentice"	Caity Lotz	Keto Shimizu & Ray Utarnachitt	June 6, 2021	T13.22555	0.42
88	6	"Bishop's Gambit"	Kevin Mock	James Eagan & Emily Cheever	June 13, 2021	T13.22556	0.41
89	7	"Back to the Finale: Part II"	Glen Winter	Morgan Faust & Mark Bruner	June 20, 2021	T13.22557	0.45
90	8	"Stressed Western"	David Ramsey	Matthew Maala	June 27, 2021	T13.22558	0.44
91	9	"This Is Gus"	Eric Dean Seaton	Tyron B. Carter	July 11, 2021	T13.22559	0.40
92	10	"Bad Blood"	Alexandra La Roche	Grainne Godfree	July 18, 2021	T13.22560	0.39
93	11	"The Final Frame"	Jes Macallan	James Eagan & Ray Utarnachitt	August 8, 2021	T13.22561	0.45
94	12	"Bored on Board Onboard"	Harry Jierjian	Keto Shimizu & Leah Poulliot	August 15, 2021	T13.22562	0.35
95	13	"Silence of the Sonograms"	Nico Sachse	Phil Klemmer & Morgan Faust	August 22, 2021	T13.22563	0.41
96	14	"There Will Be Brood"	Maisie Richardson-Sellers	Ray Utarnachitt & Marcelena Campos Mayhorn	August 29, 2021	T13.22564	0.43
97	15	"The Fungus Amongus"	David A. Geddes	Keto Shimizu & James Eagan	September 5, 2021	T13.22565	0.39

=== Season 7 (2021–22) ===
Season seven episodes
No. overall	No. in season	Title	Directed by	Written by	Original release date	Prod. code	U.S. viewers (millions)
98	1	"The Bullet Blondes"	Kevin Mock	James Eagan & Ray Utarnachitt	October 13, 2021	T13.23201	0.59
99	2	"The Need for Speed"	Alexandra La Roche	Morgan Faust & Marcelena Campos Mayhorn	October 20, 2021	T13.23202	0.52
100	3	"wvrdr_error_100<oest-of-th3-gs.gid30n> not found"	Caity Lotz	Phil Klemmer & Matthew Maala	October 27, 2021	T13.23203	0.51
101	4	"Speakeasy Does It"	Kristin Windell	Keto Shimizu & Emily Cheever	November 3, 2021	T13.23204	0.56
102	5	"It's a Mad, Mad, Mad, Mad Scientist"	Andrew Kasch	Paiman Kalayeh & Mark Bruner	November 10, 2021	T13.23205	0.48
103	6	"Deus Ex Latrina"	Nico Sachse	Ray Utarnachitt & Mercedes Valle	November 17, 2021	T13.23206	0.50
104	7	"A Woman's Place Is in the War Effort!"	Glen Winter	Morgan Faust & Leah Poulliot	November 24, 2021	T13.23207	0.50
105	8	"Paranoid Android"	David Geddes	Phil Klemmer & Marcelena Campos Mayhorn	January 12, 2022	T13.23208	0.56
106	9	"Lowest Common Demoninator"	Eric Dean Seaton	James Eagan & Emily Cheever	January 19, 2022	T13.23209	0.55
107	10	"The Fixed Point"	Maisie Richardson-Sellers	Matthew Maala & Paiman Kalayeh	January 26, 2022	T13.23210	0.57
108	11	"Rage Against the Machines"	Jes Macallan	Mark Bruner & Mercedes Valle	February 2, 2022	T13.23211	0.64
109	12	"Too Legit to Quit"	Sudz Sutherland	Morgan Faust & Leah Poulliot	February 23, 2022	T13.23212	0.43
110	13	"Knocked Down, Knocked Up"	Kevin Mock	Phil Klemmer & Keto Shimizu	March 2, 2022	T13.23213	0.46

== Ratings ==
Legends of Tomorrow : U.S. viewers per episode (millions)

Season	Episode number																	
Season	1	2	3	4	5	6	7	8	9	10	11	12	13	14	15	16	17	18
1	3.21	2.89	2.32	2.39	2.25	2.47	2.28	2.01	1.97	1.88	1.98	1.78	1.86	1.63	1.89	1.85	–	
2	1.82	1.80	1.75	1.75	1.77	1.85	3.39	2.00	1.74	1.78	1.77	1.64	1.54	1.34	1.72	1.59	1.52	–
3	1.71	1.58	1.43	1.38	1.52	1.53	1.49	2.80	1.61	1.51	1.40	1.51	1.19	1.26	1.25	1.28	1.23	1.41
4	1.00	0.94	0.86	0.90	0.91	0.97	0.93	1.10	0.92	0.95	0.98	0.85	0.91	0.94	0.99	1.05	–	
5	1.35	0.72	0.77	0.74	0.72	0.74	0.73	0.67	0.65	0.69	0.72	0.66	0.80	0.76	0.73	–		
6	0.44	0.47	0.38	0.42	0.42	0.41	0.45	0.44	0.40	0.39	0.45	0.35	0.41	0.43	0.39	–		
7	0.59	0.52	0.51	0.56	0.48	0.50	0.50	0.56	0.55	0.57	0.64	0.43	0.46	–				

Audience measurement performed by Nielsen Media Research
