= Lovell Adams-Gray =

Canadian actor

- Born: 3 February 1992 (age 34); Toronto, Ontario, Canada
- Occupation: Actor
- Years active: 2014–present
- Known for: Portraying Dru Tejada on Book II
- Spouse: Kiana Madeira (m. 2023)

Lovell Adams-Gray (born 3 February 1992) is a Canadian actor.

== Career ==
He is best known for the role of Dru Tejada in Power Book II: Ghost, and his performance in the web series 21 Black Futures, for which he won the Canadian Screen Award for Best Lead Performance in a Web Program or Series at the 10th Canadian Screen Awards in 2022.

Originally from the Etobicoke district of Toronto, he has also had roles in the television series Lost & Found Music Studios, Slasher, Second Jen and Coroner, and played Jelly in Clement Virgo's film adaptation of David Chariandy's novel Brother.

== Personal life ==
In 2017, Adams-Gray began dating actress Kiana Madeira; they became engaged in 2021. They married in September 2023.

== Filmography ==
=== Film ===
Year	Title	Role	Notes	Ref.
2015	Len and Company	Chad		
2016	Great Canadians	Marcus		
2017	Little Death	Arnie		
2022	Brother	Jelly		
2024	Morningside	Jay		
2024	Sway	Richie		
2026	Mayday			

=== Television ===
Year	Title	Role	Notes	Ref.
2014	Warehouse 13	Charlie Battes	Episode: "Savage Seduction"	
2015	Millions	Cobra Bully #1	Episode #1.1	
2015	Rogue	Lobo	2 episodes	
2016	Dead of Summer	Michael Goodson	2 episodes	
2016	Lost & Found Music Studios	Tully	9 episodes	
2017	Slasher	Peter Broome	8 episodes	
2017	Odd Squad	Dancing Man	Episode: "License to Science/Negative Town"	
2018	Legends of Tomorrow	Barack Obama	Episode: "Guest Starring John Noble"	
2018	Second Jen	Marcus	4 episodes	
2018	Christmas with a View	Mike Mahoney	Television film	
2019	Hudson & Rex	Caleb Cromby	Episode: "Fast Eddie's, Slow Food"	
2019	Surveillance	Ben Ortega	Television film	
2019–2020	Coroner	Dr. Dwayne Allen	9 episodes	
2020	Christmas in the Rockies	Garth	Television film	
2020–2024	Power Book II: Ghost	Dru Tejada	Main role	
2021	21 Black Futures			
