= Guest Starring John Noble =

- Legends of Tomorrow episode
- Grodd (David Sobolov) attempts to assassinate future President Barack Obama (Lovell Adams-Gray). The scene was praised by critics who felt it was a good example of the comedic side of Legends of Tomorrow.
- Episode no.: Season 3 Episode 17
- Directed by: Ralph Hemecker
- Written by: Keto Shimizu; James Eagan
- Production code: T13.20617
- Original air date: April 2, 2018

Guest appearances
- Lovell Adams-Gray as Barack Obama; Arthur Darvill as Rip Hunter; Courtney Ford as Nora Darhk; Jes Macallan as Ava Sharpe; Neal McDonough as Damien Darhk; John Noble as Mallus and himself; David Sobolov as Gorilla Grodd

Episode chronology
← Previous "I, Ava"	Next → "The Good, the Bad and the Cuddly"
- Legends of Tomorrow season 3

"Guest Starring John Noble" is the seventeenth and penultimate episode of the third season of the American television series Legends of Tomorrow. It is set in the Arrowverse, sharing continuity with the other television series in the universe. The series revolves around an eponymous team of superheroes and their time-traveling adventures. The episode first aired on The CW on April 2, 2018, to a live audience of 1.40 million viewers, with an additional 800 thousand on DVR.

The episode features the Legends traveling in time to prevent Damien Darhk (Neal McDonough) from freeing Mallus (John Noble). However, he realizes that freeing him will kill his daughter Nora (Courtney Ford), and he switches sides. Meanwhile, Amaya Jiwe (Maisie Richardson-Sellers) attempts to change the timeline to save her family from being killed.

"Guest Starring John Noble" was met with generally positive reviews from critics. Following the episode's release, a scene featuring Gorilla Grodd attempting to assassinate future President Barack Obama went viral on social media. The scene received high praise from critics, who noted it as a good example of the comedic side of the series.

== Plot ==
The Legends travel to 1979 to stop Gorilla Grodd from killing future president Barack Obama. The team rescues Obama and use Ray Palmer's shrink ray to trap Grodd in a glass jar. Elsewhere, Damien Dahrk realizes that his daughter Nora, whose body the demon Mallus is using as a host, will be killed when Mallus is released. Damien allies himself with the Legends to save Nora. He gives up the Water Totem, one of the six mystical totems key to killing Mallus and the only one of the six he possesses. Ray realizes Mallus sounds like actor John Noble and travels to the set of The Lord of the Rings: The Return of the King to get Noble to impersonate Mallus. Ray then uses Noble's voice to trick Nora onto the Waverider and imprison her.

After learning she is a clone, (Note: As depicted in "I, Ava") Ava Sharpe asks her former boss and ex-captain of the Legends Rip Hunter if he knew. Rip revealed that he did and that she is the 12th AVA clone he has recruited. Meanwhile, Amaya Jiwe leaves the Legends to return to home to 1992 Zambesi. After her departure, Amaya plans to change history by preventing the destruction of her village. Her boyfriend Nate Haywood is sent to try and change her mind but instead helps her. Sara Lance determines that only way to stop Mallus is to free him from his prison and kill him, she decides to allow Amaya to alter time and release Mallus. Believing Nora is dead anyways, Sara gives Damien the Death Totem and the rest of the team wields their individual totems. However, before they kill Mallus, Damien discovers that Nora is still alive in Mallus and releases Grodd to destroy Zambesi, correcting time and preventing Mallus' release. To save Zambesi, Nate subdues Grodd with the Earth Totem, allowing Mallus to break out of his prison and kill Nora.

== Production ==
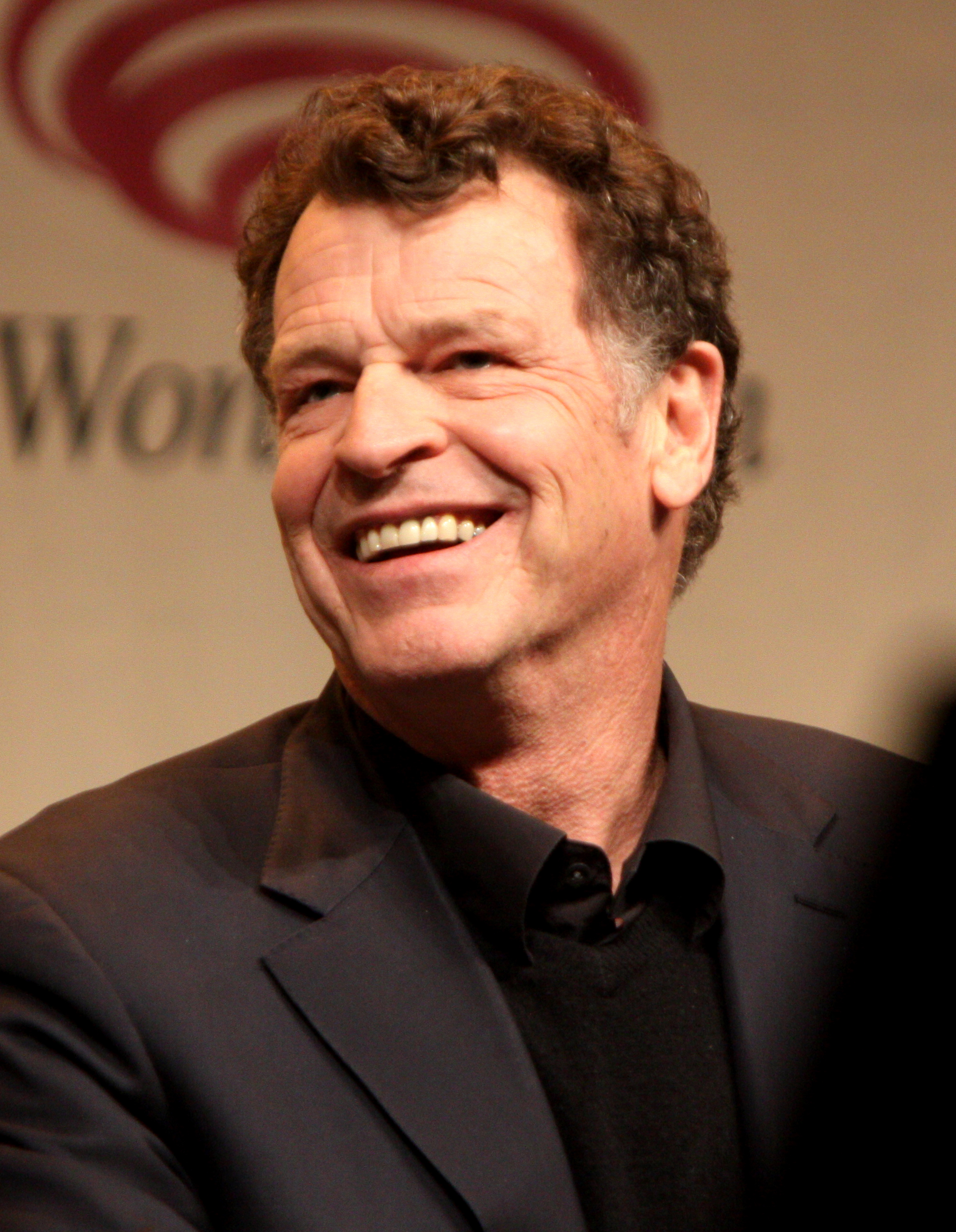
John Noble speaking at Wondercon 2012 in Anaheim, California.

"Guest Starring John Noble" was directed by Ralph Hemecker and written by Keto Shimizu and James Eagan. The episode stars Caity Lotz, Brandon Routh, Tala Ashe, Dominic Purcell, Keiynan Lonsdale, Maisie Richardson-Sellers, Nick Zano as Sara Lance, Ray Palmer, Zari Tomaz, Mick Rory, Wally West, Amaya Jiwe, and Nate Haywood, respectively. John Noble makes a guest appearance as himself in addition to his recurring role as the voice of the season's main villain Mallus. Noble appears dressed as Denethor, a character he portrayed in the 2001 The Lord of the Rings film series. Arthur Darvill, Jes Macallan, Courtney Ford and Neal McDonough reprise their respective roles as Rip Hunter, Ava Sharpe, Nora Darhk, and Damien Darhk. Despite her character having a major reveal in the previous episode, "I, Ava", Macallan plays a relatively minor role. Lovell Adams-Gray makes a guest star appearance as a college aged version of former President of the United States Barack Obama. David Sobolov voices the CGI character Gorilla Grodd. Grodd previously appeared earlier in the seventh episode of the season, "Welcome to the Jungle", and in Legends of Tomorrow's parent show The Flash.

According to executive producer Phil Klemmer, the scene between Obama and Grodd was almost cut from episode due to budgetary concerns. Speaking to TVLine, he described Sara's line to Obama, "I really miss you", as "icing on an already delicious cake." Ray's line to Obama, "Run Barry, run!", was a nod to The Flash. A scene with between Lotz and Darvill was filmed but cut. It featured Sara and Rip discussing how Sara replaced Rip as captain of the Legends. The scene was included on the Legends of Tomorrow season three DVD. Speaking with Russ Burlingame of ComicBook.com, Richardson-Sellers called her experience playing the 72-year-old version of Amaya Jiwe "horrible" because of the elements involved in creating the character's look, particularly application process. To apply the makeup, Richardson-Sellers wore a full head cast with breathing holes for two hours. The makeup artists then spent four hours to "created a whole new face and neck" which they glued and spray painted onto her. Despite her discomfort, she described the final product as being "freakishly convincing."

== Release ==
"Guest Starring John Noble" first aired in the United States on The CW on April 2, 2018. It premiered to 1.40 million live viewers with a 0.4/2 share among adults 18–49. The episode was the lowest viewed in its timeslot behind an airing of the 2018 Winter Olympics, episodes of Celebrity Big Brother and The Bachelor, and a rerun of Lucifer. It was the highest viewed episode on The CW that night ahead of reruns of Whose Line Is It Anyway?. The episode was viewed by an additional 800 thousand viewers on DVR for a total audience of 2.04 million.

Following the episode's release, the scene of Grodd attempting to kill Obama went viral on social media. The clip briefly resurfaced in 2023 following the series finale of The Flash as an example of the weirdness of both Legends of Tomorrow and the Arrowverse as a whole. It was featured on a 2025 episode of Last Week Tonight with John Oliver, where comedian John Oliver jokingly called it "single-best ten seconds of TV I've ever seen".

== Reception ==
The Obama scene and Noble's cameo as himself was praised by critics. The Guardian's Graeme Virtue labeled the inclusion of Obama as a high point for Legends of Tomorrow; he felt that it perfectly illustrated the comedic tone of the series. Writing for Bleeding Cool, Dan Wickline praised the episode's emotional beats as well as Noble's cameo as himself. In a review for Den of Geek, Jim Dandeneau praised the episode. He felt the lines relating to Obama were the funniest of the episode. Dandeneau felt while the episode was mostly great, he found Mallus and Amaya to be disappointing.

Writing for The A.V. Club, Oliver Sava rated the episode an A−. He praised Noble's role in the episode, noting it as an example of the high quality writing and the show's "comedic appeal", writing, "they've already done plenty of crazy shit on this show, so why not bring in Noble for a quick physical cameo after voicing their main villain all season?" However, Sava criticized Maisie Richardson-Sellers's makeup as the older version of Amaya as well as the relative minor role Tala Ashe plays in the episode. In an IGN review for the third season of Legends of Tomorrow, Jesse Schedeen criticized the character of Mallus and stated that Noble's performance as the character failed to stand out. He felt that Noble's cameo appearance alone was better than Mallus overall.
