= Aruba-Con =

- Legends of Tomorrow episode
- Episode no.: Season 3 Episode 1
- Directed by: Rob Seidenglanz
- Written by: Phil Klemmer; Marc Guggenheim
- Production code: T13.20601
- Original air date: October 10, 2017

Guest appearances
- Arthur Darvill as Rip Hunter; Keiynan Lonsdale as Wally West / Kid Flash; Jes Macallan as Ava Sharpe; Simon Merrells as Julius Caesar; Adam Tsekhman as Gary Green

Episode chronology
| ← Previous "Aruba" | Next → "Freakshow" |
- Legends of Tomorrow season 3

"Aruba-Con" is the first episode of the third season of the American science fiction television series Legends of Tomorrow. The series revolves around the eponymous team of superheroes and their time traveling adventures. It is set in the Arrowverse, sharing continuity with the other television series of the universe. The episode was written by series creators Phil Klemmer and Marc Guggenheim and directed by Rob Seidenglanz.

== Plot ==
After defeating the Legion of Doom, the Legends arrive in Los Angeles, California, and find a large number of "anachronisms". (Note: As depicted in "Aruba") They encounter their captain, Rip Hunter, who reveals that he has created an agency known as the Time Bureau to fix anachronisms; he disbands the Legends. Six months later, the Legends are living normal lives but are nostalgic for their previous adventures. In Aruba, Mick Rory captures Julius Caesar, informs the other Legends and the Bureau. However, once the bureau.

However, after delivering the wrong man and being dismissed by Rip, the Legends steal their time machine, the Waverider, and capture the real Caesar. When Rip demands that they deliver Caesar to the bureau and let them fix the anachronism, the Legends return Caesar to 49 BC themselves. However, during the return, Caesar steals Nate's history book and uses this knowledge to conquer the world. The bureau arrives, seizing control of the operation. Agent Ava Sharpe is captured during an excursion to retrieve the book, reluctantly Rip allows the Legends to fix the anachronism; he later tells Sharpe that they could be useful in neutralizing Mallus. Meanwhile in 1942, former Legend Amaya Jiwe attacks a group of poachers.

== Production ==
In January 2017, shortly before the release of the season two finale, Legends of Tomorrow was renewed by The CW. Showrunner and co-creator Phil Klemmer described the season as "more in the world of the occult and monsters". Co-creator Marc Guggenheim said that he wanted to have the Legends visit new locations, including Golden-Age Hollywood and Victorian London. "Aruba-Con" was written by Klemmer and Guggenheim, and directed by Rob Seidenglanz. The first draft of the script was submitted on June 20, 2017. It went through a single set of revisions, with the final version completed July 11. The episode entered preparation on July 7, and began shooting on July 18. The episode's name is in reference to both the previous episode, "Aruba", and Ceaser's crossing of the Rubicon.

The episode stars Caity Lotz, Franz Drameh, Dominic Purcell, Victor Garber, Nick Zano, Maisie Richardson-Sellers, and Brandon Routh, as Sara Lance, Jefferson Jackson, Mick Rory, Martin Stein, Nate Heywood, Amaya Jiwe, and Ray Palmer, respectively. Former series regular Arthur Darvill makes his first appearance in a recurring role as Rip Hunter. Keiynan Lonsdale and Simon Merrells guest star as Julius Caesar and Wally West, respectively. Lonsdale reprised his role from The Flash, Legends of Tomorrow's parent show. He would later return in the twelfth episode, "The Curse of the Earth Totem", were he was promoted to series regular for the remainder of season three.

== Release ==
"Aruba-Con" was broadcast in the United States on The CW on October 10, 2017, to a live audience of 1.71 million viewers with a 0.6/3 share among adults 18-49. The episode was the lowest viewed broadcast in the Tuesday 9 p.m. timeslot, behind episodes of Bull, This Is Us, Black-ish, and The Mick. Additionally, it was also the least viewed broadcast of the night on The CW, behind an episode of The Flash, and the second lowest of the night overall, ahead of only Brooklyn Nine-Nine on Fox. The episode had 190 thousand more viewers than the previous episode, "Aruba", and 130 thousand less than the following episode, "Freakshow". When accounting for seven-day DVR viewership, "Aruba-Con" was viewed by an additional 1.14 million viewers for a total audience size of 2.85 million.

=== Critical reception ===
The episode received generally positive reviews from critics. On the review aggregator website Rotten Tomatoes, 78% of 9 critics' reviews are positive, with an average rating of 6.8/10. The website's consensus reads: "Legends returns with an uneven season premiere that doesn't fully fulfill the show's delightfully bonkers potential, but gets close enough to enjoy."

IGN's Jesse Schedeen graded the episode an 8.3/10, writing "Legends of Tomorrow makes some baffling decisions in its premiere, but the core of the show is as entertaining as ever." He criticized the episode's lack of follow up on the season two ending finding it "frustrating". He also disliked the shift in Rip's characterization from the prior two seasons. Jim Dandeneau of Den of Geek
