= Shayan Sobhian =

American actor and musician (born 1994)

Shayan Sobhian (born October 17, 1994) is an American actor and musician famous for the roles in TV shows such as Legends of Tomorrow and The Chosen.

== Early life and education ==
Sobhian was born on October 17, 1994, in the United States. He is of Iranian (Persian) origin. He grew up in Chelmsford, Massachusetts. He graduated from SUNY Purchase. He moved to New York to attend an acting school.

== Career ==
Sobhian is an actor of both stage and screen. He gained an international recognition in the shows Legends of Tomorrow and The Chosen. He played apostle James the Great in the first half of The Chosen.

Sobhian's first major role was in time travel superhero television series Legends of Tomorrow, cited as his pivotal role. His character first appeared in the Season 4 finale, and an actor appeared in 11 episodes as a recurring, before being promoted to series regular. He starred as Anthony Hope in a musical Sweeney Todd (2022). He also starred in a play Lost and Guided. He is a director and co-writer of the short film Does Bigfoot Dream of Flowers?. Sobhian is also a musician. He formed a band Mister Child with his brother and two more musicians. They announced their first single in 2023.

== Personal life ==
Sobhian married actress and yoga teacher Sally Meehan in a private ceremony in 2020. He is a member of Baháʼí Faith and practices yoga. The couple resides in Cohasset.

== Filmography ==
Year	Title	Role	Notes
2019	The Chosen	Big James	
2020–2022	Legends of Tomorrow	Behrad Tarazi	
