= Aruba (Legends of Tomorrow) =

- Legends of Tomorrow episode
- Episode no.: Season 2 Episode 17
- Directed by: Rob Seidenglanz
- Written by: Marc Guggenheim; Phil Klemmer
- Production code: T13.20017
- Original air date: April 4, 2017
- Running time: 41

Guest appearances
- Katie Cassidy as Laurel Lance; Jack Turner as J. R. R. Tolkien; John Barrowman as Malcolm Merlyn; Neal McDonough as Damien Darhk

Episode chronology
← Previous "Doomworld"	Next → "Aruba-Con"
- Legends of Tomorrow (season 2)

"Aruba" is the seventeenth and final episode of the second season and thirty-third overall of the American science fiction television series Legends of Tomorrow, revolving around the eponymous team of superheroes and their time traveling adventures. It is the conclusion to a two-part storyline which began with the previous episode "Doomworld". The episode is set in the Arrowverse, sharing continuity with the other television series of the universe. The episode was written by Marc Guggenheim and Phil Klemmer, and was directed by Robert Seidenglanz.

This episode stars Caity Lotz as Sara Lance as well as the rest of the regular cast consisting of Brandon Routh, Victor Garber, Arthur Darvill, Matt Letscher, Franz Drameh, Maisie Richardson-Sellers, Amy Louise Pemberton, Nick Zano, and Dominic Purcell. This is the final episode to feature Darvill and Letscher as series regulars, both would return in guest appearances.

== Plot ==
Rip Hunter, trapped inside a shrunken down version of the Waverider, flies the ship to where the Legends have begun devising a plan to undo the Legion of Doom's victory. Ray Palmer de-miniaturizes the Waverider and the team returns to 1916 to steal the Spear of Destiny. Eobard Thawne arrives from the altered reality, destroys the blood of Christ, kills future Ray, and informs the past Legion members about the future Legends. The Legends end up interacting with their past selves. The resulting time storm prevents the use of the Waverider to escape. Shortly after, they are ambushed by Merlyn, Damien Darhk, and Leonard Snart. During the subsequent battle, the future Legends are killed except Sara Lance and Rip, while the Legion is incapacitated by the past Legends. Thawne arrives with numerous time remnants of himself to fight the team, killing future Rip. Sara takes the Spear and consults a manifestation of Laurel Lance. Thawne steals and attempts to use the Spear, only to learn that Sara removed its powers. The Black Flash arrives and erases Thawne, with future Sara also fading from existence along with the Spear. Nate Heywood convinces Amaya Jiwe to stay, while Rip leaves the team. The Legends leave the Legion in their respective places throughout the timeline and, at Mick Rory's request, set off for Aruba. However, they arrive in Los Angeles, now occupied by dinosaurs and buildings from other points in history.

== Production ==
=== Development and filming ===
The episode began filming on February 14, 2017, and concluded on the 28th of the same month. After the events of the previous episode, "Doomworld", there was some speculation on some of the episode's plot points, particularly how Amaya will be resurrected. In an interview, executive producer Phil Klemmer teased that Katie Cassidy would be reprising her role as Laurel Lance and that there would be many deaths. Klemmer felt that his statements would raise questions as Laurel previously died in the Arrow episode "Eleven-Fifty-Nine" (2016), and the second due to nature of the Arrowverse season finales typically only killing off one character at a time.

=== Writing ===
The episode was written by Phil Klemmer and Marc Guggenheim. The episode title is a reference to Mick Rory repeatedly requesting for the Legends to visit Aruba across the season.

=== Casting ===
The episode stars Caity Lotz as Sara Lance alongside principal cast members Brandon Routh, Victor Garber, Arthur Darvill, Franz Drameh, Maisie Richardson-Sellers, Amy Louise Pemberton, Nick Zano, Dominic Purcell, and Matt Letscher as Ray Palmer, Martin Stein, Rip Hunter, Jefferson Jackson, Gideon (voice only), Nate Heywood, and Eobard Thawne respectively. This is the final appearance of both Darvill and Letscher as series regulars. Darvill returned in a recurring status for the third season, while Letscher returned as a special guest star in two episodes of the seventh season.

John Barrowman, Wentworth Miller, and Neal McDonough recur as Malcolm Merlyn, Leonard Snart, and Damien Darhk respectively. The guest cast included Katie Cassidy as Laurel Lance and Jack Turner as J. R. R. Tolkien.

== Release ==
The episode premiered on The CW on the fourth of April in 2017 to an audience of 1.52 million people, it had a share of 0.6/2 among adults age 19–49.

On August 15, 2017, the episode was released on both DVD and Blu-ray as a part of the Legends of Tomorrow season two box set.

=== Critical reception ===
Critic reviews for the episode are primarily positive. It holds a 90% out of 10 critic reviews on the review aggregate site Rotten Tomatoes. The sites critical consensus reads, ""Aruba" manages to tie up the loose ends of Legend's absurd storylines, officially redeeming the series from a mediocre debut season."

IGN's Jesse Schedeen gave the episode a rating of 8.9 and said "Legends of Tomorrow wrapped up an excellent season with a satisfying, eventful finale episode." Oliver Sava of The A.V. Club said, "Legends Of Tomorrow experienced a major upswing in quality this season by being playful and leaning into the campy fun of time travel, and the cliffhanger suggests that the creative team is going even bigger moving forward" and followed it up with a rating of A−.

In an article for Collider written by Allison Keene the episode received a rating of 4 stars with the review of, "'Aruba' had its fun by allowing two sets of Legends to occupy most of the episode, killing off the 'spares' from the changed reality version of the future in often gory ways. Nate's egregious wig and the casual tossing around of the blood of Christ aside, the dueling characters were mostly a delight, particularly Mick Rory, who would of course be the one to pick a fight with his past self."
