= The Great British Fake Off =

- Legends of Tomorrow episode
- Ava Sharpe holding a sword used to kill encores.
- Episode no.: Season 5 Episode 9
- Directed by: David A. Geddes
- Written by: Jackie Canino
- Production code: T13.21910
- Original air date: April 28, 2020

Guest appearances
- Adam Tsekhman as Gary Green; Sarah Strange as Lachesis; Joanna Vanderham as Atropos; Timothy Lyle as Jack the Ripper; Abby Ross as Bonnie Parker; Ben Sullivan as Clyde Barrow; Chris Gauthier as King Henry VIII; Peter Ciuffa as Brutus

Episode chronology
← Previous "Zari, Not Zari"	Next → "Ship Broken"
- Legends of Tomorrow (season 5)

"The Great British Fake Off" is the ninth episode of the fifth season and 77th overall of the American science fiction television series Legends of Tomorrow, revolving around the eponymous team of superheroes and their time travelling adventures. It is set in the Arrowverse, sharing continuity with the other television series of the universe. The episode was written by Jackie Canino, and directed by David A, Geddes.

Matt Ryan and Tala Ashe, star as John Constantine and Zari Tarazi, they are joined by principal cast members, Caity Lotz, Jes Macallan, Olivia Swann, Nick Zano, Matt Ryan, Dominic Purcell, Amy Louise Pemberton, and Maisie Richardson-Sellers.

== Plot ==
Charlie reveals she gave the last Loom fragment to the Enchantress, who made it extremely difficult to find. John Constantine tries using everyone's energy to summon the fragment, but Sara faints; forcing him and Zari to travel to the United Kingdom in 1918, where they discover Constantine's house used to be a boarding house. They check-in, only to find several Encores have beaten them there. After disguising themselves as Jack the Ripper and Cleopatra, they discover Charlie's second sister, Lachesis, sent the Encores for the same purpose as them. Though their deception is discovered, Constantine and Zari successfully destroy the Encores, recover their Hell weapons, and get the Ring from the housekeeper; who unbeknownst to Zari, was the Enchantress. Meanwhile, Ava Sharpe, Gary Green, and Mick Rory go to Hell to confront Astra Logue and learn why she sent her Encores, only for Astra to discover that Lachesis and Atropos stole her soul coins to get the Loom for themselves, though they offer to give her Charlie's place. Astra accepts to get Constantine's coin back, but secretly joins the Legends to ensure that her fate is changed for the better.

== Production ==
=== Development and filming ===
Development on the episode began on November 6, 2019, and finished on the 21st of the same month.

=== Writing ===
The episode was written by Jackie Canino. The scene where Sara kisses Ava was improvised by Caity Lotz. The episode's title is a play on The Great British Bake Off.

=== Casting ===
The episode stars Caity Lotz, Tala Ashe, Jes Macallan, Nick Zano, Matt Ryan, Dominic Purcell, Amy Louise Pemberton, and Maisie Richardson-Sellers as Sara Lance, Zari Tarazi, Nate Haywood, John Constantine, Mick Rory, Gideon (as a voice actor), and Charlie.

This is the first episode since "Hey, World!" not to guest star Shayan Sobhian as Behrad Tarazi. This is due to the characters death in the previous episode. The episode guest stars Adam Tsekhman as Gary Green.

This episode guest stars several historical figures including Timothy Lyle as Jack the Ripper, Abby Ross and Ben Sullivan as Bonnie & Clyde, Chris Gauthier as King Henry VIII, and Peter Ciuffa as Brutus.

== Release ==
=== Broadcast ===
"The Great British Fake Off" was set to be aired on March 31, 2020, but was delayed. The episode was ultamitly released on April 28, 2020. It was watched by 0.69 million viewers with a 0.2 share among adults 18–49.

=== Critical reception ===
Den of Geek's Jim Dandeneau rated the episode a 4/5 saying it stuck the landing. The A.V. Club's Alison Shoemaker said that the episode met all of its planned goals Laura Hurley of Cinemablend praised the love triangle between John Constantine, Nate Heywood, and Zari Tarazi.
