= Kaupe =

Hawaiian mythological character

In Hawaiian mythology, Kaupe is a malevolent spirit that calls out to people at night to lure them to their deaths. According to legend, he used to rule Nu'uanu Valley.

== Mythology ==
During his reign, Kaupe ate people on Oahu, then Maui. When he went to the island of Hawaii, he kidnapped the son of a High chief and took him back to Oahu so he could be sacrificed. Following them to Oahu, the High chief went to a Kahuna who taught him incantations and a prayer which he could use against Kaupe. At the heiau at Lihue, the father rescued his son. When Kaupe chased them, the father said the prayer, causing him and his son to run faster. As Kaupe caught up, the father said the prayer again and he and his son found a big rock to hide behind. On Hawaii, the father and son killed Kaupe. The spirit of Kaupe lingers on Oahu.

According to mythology, Kaupe appears as an enormous man with a canine head and sharp claws. Kaupe has frequented two spots on the island of Oahu. Though he is said to originally be from Nuuanu Valley, he is more often encountered under Kipapa Bridge.

Kaupe is often considered a "calling ghost" because he calls to his victims rather than searching them out or coming across them by coincidence. His technique is to mimic the sound of numerous wounded or dying people. When his victim runs to the scene to help, Kaupe reveals himself to the victim, silently slipping from the shadows.

== Popular culture ==
In Legends of Tomorrow, the Kaupe is a hairy beast. One named Konane (portrayed by Darien Martin) is one of the magical fugitives that escaped from Mallus' realm where anyone who gets slashed by a Kaupe will become a Kaupe. He develops a relationship with a Time Bureau delivery girl named Mona Wu (portrayed by Ramona Young). During a struggle with the Time Bureau operatives, Mona is slashed in the stomach. When Konane is killed by a Time Bureau operative, Mona transforms into her Kaupe form (portrayed by Sisa Grey) for the first time and avenges Konane's death. The Legends of Tomorrow took her onto their team.
