= Zari, Not Zari =

- Legends of Tomorrow episode
- Episode no.: Season 5 Episode 8
- Directed by: Kevin Mock
- Written by: Morgan Faust; Tyron B. Carter
- Production code: T13.21909
- Original air date: April 21, 2020

Guest appearances
- Adam Tsekhman as Gary Green; Shayan Sobhian as Behrad Tarazi; Sarah Strange as Lachesis; Joanna Vanderham as Atropos; Mina Sundwall as Lita Rory; Jack Gillett as Declan

Episode chronology
← Previous "Romeo v Juliet: Dawn of Justness"	Next → "The Great British Fake Off"
- Legends of Tomorrow (season 5)

"Zari, Not Zari" is the eight episode of the fifth season and 76th overall of the American science fiction television series Legends of Tomorrow, revolving around the eponymous team of superheroes and their time travelling adventures. It is set in the Arrowverse, sharing continuity with the other television series of the universe. The episode was written by Morgan Faust and Tyron B. Carter, and directed by Kevin Mock.

Maisie Richardson-Sellers, stars as Charlie, she is joined by principal cast members, Caity Lotz, Jes Macallan, Nick Zano, Matt Ryan, Dominic Purcell, Amy Louise Pemberton, Matt Ryan and Tala Ashe.

== Plot ==
Charlie's sister Atropos murders Charlie's old band and many of their fans soon after she was recruited by the Legends. Sara Lance, Charlie, and John Constantine discover that the second piece of the Loom is hidden in the present day on the set of Supernatural. Before they can find it, Atropos attacks them and takes the second piece of the Loom after seemingly killing Sara. Following this, Atropos sets off to the ship to find the first piece of the Loom. Meanwhile, Zari Tarazi tries to discover why she is experiencing memories of the previous timeline. While communing with her family's spirits inside the wind totem, she finds her past self and they discuss their different lives; reconciling their differences and granting Zari Tomaz control of the totem once more. When Atropos enters the Waverider, she kills Behrad Tarazi. Sara and Charlie take back the Loom pieces and throw her into the timestream. Elsewhere, Mick wants to improve his relationship with his daughter Lita, so he and Ava try to make memorable moments and take photos throughout Lita's life. However, Lita continues to be disappointed and Mick realizes that he needs to be more involved in her life in order to be a good father.

== Production ==
=== Development and Filming ===
"Zari, Not Zari" was directed by Kevin Mock. The episode began preparation on October 11, 2019, and ended October 22. Filming began the next day and ended on November 4. The scenes that take place in Vancouver were filmed on location on the actual set of Supernatural. This fact is referenced with-in the episode. Additionally the Winchester's Impala appears in the episode, however this is a recreation and not the one used in the show.

=== Writing ===
"Zari, Not Zari" was written by Morgan Faust and Tyron B. Carter. Writing on the episode began on October 18, 2019, and finished on October 22. The episode contains several references to another CW series, Supernatural.

=== Casting ===
The episode stars Maisie Richardson-Sellers, Caity Lotz, Tala Ashe, Jes Macallan, Nick Zano, Matt Ryan, Dominic Purcell, and Amy Louise Pemberton as Charlie, Sara Lance, Zari Tarazi, Nate Haywood, John Constantine, Mick Rory, Gideon (as a voice actor). Neither Courtney Ford and Olivia Swann appear in this episode despite both being series regulars.

The episode guest stars Adam Tsekhman as Gary Green and Shayan Sobhian as Behrad Tarazi. Many characters connected to Charlie appear in this episode. Sarah Strange and Joanna Vanderham play Charlie's sisters Lachesis and Atropos. Jack Gillett returned from the season four episode, "Dancing Queen" as Charlie's bandmate Declan. Mina Sundwall guest stars as Mick Rory's daughter, Lita Rory.

This is the first episode of the series to not feature Brandon Routh as a series regular, due to Ray Palmer leaving the Legends in the previous episode. Routh's absence leaves Caity Lotz as the only actor to appear in every episode of the series to that point.

== Release ==
=== Broadcast ===
"Zari, Not Zari" was first broadcast on The CW on April 21, 2020. It was to set to aired on March 24, 2020, but due to the COVID-19 pandemic was replaced with a rerun of "A-head of Her Time". It was watched by 0.65 million viewers with a 0.2 share among adults 18–49. When accounting for seven day DVR viewership the episode gains an additional 0.54 million viewers for a total of 1.19

=== Critical reception ===
"Zari, Not Zari" received positive reviews from critics.

TVFanatic's Sara Little was surprised by Behrad's death and was excited to see what comes next.

Den of Geek's Jim Dandeneau rated the episode a 4.5/5. Dandeneau said that "95% of this episode, was typical great Legends of Tomorrow" and only disliked Mick's subplot but still found that it had great quotes. He compared the main plot of the episode to a classic Scooby Doo episode. Dandeneau praised the sequence following Behrads death
