= Ground Control to Sara Lance =

- Legends of Tomorrow episode
- Episode no.: Season 6 Episode 1
- Directed by: Kevin Mock
- Written by: James Eagan; Mark Bruner
- Production code: T13.22551
- Original air date: May 2, 2021

Guest appearances
- Thomas Nicholson as David Bowie; Shawn Roberts as Spartacus

Episode chronology
← Previous "Swan Thong"	Next → "Meat: The Legends"

"Ground Control to Sara Lance" is the first episode of the sixth season and eighty-third episode overall of the American science fiction television series Legends of Tomorrow, revolving around the eponymous team of superheroes and their time travelling adventures. It is set in the Arrowverse, sharing continuity with the other television series of the universe. The episode was written by James Eagan and Mark Bruner, and directed by Kevin Mock. The episode aired on May 2, 2021, in the United States on The CW.

The episode stars Caity Lotz and Adam Tsekhman as Sara Lance and Garry Green, alongside Tala Ashe, Jes Macallan, Olivia Swann, Amy Pemberton, Lisseth Chavez, Nick Zano, Matt Ryan, and Dominic Purcell. Thomas Nicholson makes a guest appearance as English musician David Bowie.

== Plot ==
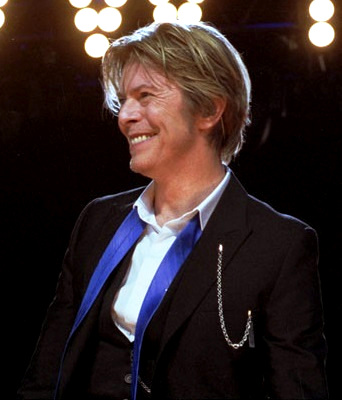
David Bowie was an English musician who died in 2016

In 1977 London, Ava Sharpe realizes that Sara Lance is missing, and learns from David Bowie that she was going to propose but was abducted by aliens. Ava is consoled by Nate Heywood and contacts the D.E.O., unaware that it was destroyed. John Constantine returns to his house with Zari Tarazi and Astra Logue and fails to find Sara using magic, but discovers a human chrysalis in Gary Green's room and Image Inducer glasses that can transform its wearer. Behrad Tarazi learns of a girl who could communicate with aliens named Esperenza Cruz; Mick Rory kidnaps her. Sara awakens on a spaceship and frees Spartacus, only for him to be eaten by Kayla, the boss of the ship. She discovers one of her captors is Gary, who was sent to Earth to acquire the most quintessential human, but he agrees to help her escape. They knock Kayla (also Gary's fiancée) out of the ship by releasing containment pods into a wormhole leading to Earth's Temporal Zone, but fail to reach the wormhole themselves and fall towards another planet.

== Production ==
=== Development and filming ===
Filming of the episode was scheduled to begin on October 5, 2020, in Burnaby, British Columbia. Due to the COVID-19 test results for the cast and crew it was indefinitely delayed. Development on the episode ultimately began on October 8, 2020, and concluded later in the same month.

=== Writing ===
The episode was co-written by James Eagan and Mark Bruner. Eagan and Bruner submitted the production draft of the screenplay on August 19, 2019. On September 18, the second draft was completed. The third and fourth drafts of the script were completed on 23 and 27 of the month, respectively. The fifth, sixth, and seventh drafts were each completed three days apart on October 1, 4, and 7, with the seventh version being the final draft. The episode references other pieces of media including the events of Supergirl's fifth season, with the destruction of the DEO. Additionally Sara defeating the alien by opening the airlock is a reference to Alien.

=== Casting ===
The cast for the include series regulars Caity Lotz, Tala Ashe, Jes Macallan, Olivia Swann, Amy Pemberton (voice), Nick Zano, Matt Ryan, and Dominic Purcell as, Sara Lance, Zari Tarazi, Ava Sharpe, Astra Logue, Gideon, Nate Haywood, John Constatine, Mick Rory. This is the first episode where Adam Tsekhman and Shayan Sobhian appear as series regulars. Both actors had previously been reoccurring characters. They portray Garry Green and Behrad Tarazi respectively. This is the first appearance of Lisseth Chavez as Spooner Cruz. Chavez joins the main cast as a regular. On the opposite end of this Dominic Purcell announced that he would be leaving the series after this season. This episode guest stars Thomas Nicholson as David Bowie and Shawn Roberts as Spartacus.

== Release ==
=== Broadcast ===
"Ground Control to Sara Lance" was first aired in the United States on The CW on May 2, 2021. It was watched by 450,000 live viewers with a 0.1/1 share among adults aged 18 to 49. When accounting for seven day DVR viewership the episode gains an additional 440,000 viewers, for a total of 890,000 viewers. The episode finished 5th in its timeslot. The episode was the fourth-highest viewed of the season in terms of live viewers, and when considering DVR viewers, it jumps to first. (Note: DVR viewership for episodes 14 and 15 are not available.)

=== Home video ===
The episode was released as a part of the Legends of Tomorrow season six box set on November 9, 2021, for both DVD and Blu-ray and is available for digital purchase on various streaming platforms.

== Reception ==
"Ground Control to Sara Lance" was met with generally positive reviews from critics. The episode reveal of Gary Green as an alien raised questions from viewers of the show, however most simply accepted it. Allison Shoemaker of The A.V. Club said while the episode had flaws there was more good than bad, giving it a rating of B. Shoemaker praised the casting choices of the episode saying that Thomas Nicholson "nailed it" with his portrayal of David Bowie, and that Lisseth Chavez was a "natural fit" for the show. However, she felt that Chavez's character, Spooner Cruz, was inconsistent and changed from "scene to scene". Overall Shoemaker felt generally pleased with the episode as a start for the sixth season.

Jesse Schedeen of IGN rated the episode a 7/10 attributing the success of the episode to the cast and not the plot. Scheeden raised concern with the fact that only two of the original 9 Legends were still on the team, Caity Lotz's Sara Lance and Dominic Purcell's Mick Rory, and noted that Purcell would likely be leaving soon. (Note: Amy Pemberton's Gideon was not considered a Legend until season seven despite being on the show since the first season.) Scheeden felt that this concern would be proven false considering that the show had done a good job integrating new characters, citing Matt Ryan's John Constantine.

Writing for Game Rant, Bruno Savil de Jong gave the episode 3.5 out of 5 stars, and described it as a good beginning to the series' sixth season.

Jim Dandeneau of Den of Geek said that the episode was a 8/10 episode of Legends, stating that if it was another show it would be a 9.5/10. Dandeneau called the show "comic book-y", but said that it was disrespectful to comics in a fun way. He felt that the introduction was similar to Bronze Age comics in the way where it re-introduces all of the characters. Scheeden's only complaint was the retconning of Gary as an alien.
