= The Satanist's Apprentice =

- Legends of Tomorrow episode
- The episode used a blend of 2D animation and live action footage
- Episode no.: Season 6 Episode 5
- Directed by: Caity Lotz
- Written by: Keto Shimizu; Ray Utarnachitt
- Production code: T13.22555
- Original air date: June 6, 2021

Guest appearances
- Raffi Barsoumian as Bishop; Matt Lucas as Aleister Crowley (voice); Russell Roberts as Robert Truss

Episode chronology
← Previous "Bay of Squids"	Next → "Bishop's Gambit"
- Legends of Tomorrow season 6

"The Satanist's Apprentice" is the fifth episode of the sixth season of the American science fiction television series Legends of Tomorrow. The series revolves around the eponymous team of superheroes and their time-travelling adventures. It is set in the Arrowverse, sharing continuity with the other television series of the universe. The episode was written by co-showrunner Keto Shimizu and Ray Utarnachitt, and directed by series lead Caity Lotz. A portion of the episode is animated, inspired by the Disney animated films of the 1990s.

"The Satanist's Apprentice" stars Olivia Swann as Astra Logue. In the episode, Astra apprentices under Aleister Crowley (Matt Lucas), who was turned into a painting by John Constantine (Matt Ryan). After Astra and Constantine argue, Crowley casts a spell, turning the Legends into cartoon characters. Meanwhile, Sara Lance (Lotz) meets Bishop (Raffi Barsoumian), her kidnapper, and attempts to escape.

"The Satanist's Apprentice" was first aired in the United States on The CW on June 6, 2021, to an audience of 420 thousand viewers. The episode received generally positive reviews from critics who praised Lotz's directing and the contrasting storylines.

== Plot ==
At John Constantine's manor, Astra Logue struggles with everyday chores and her neighbor, Robert Truss, and is ignored by Constantine. Bored, Astra finds Aleister Crowley, an occultist trapped in a painting in Constantine's attic, who offers to assist her in finding the mythical Fountain of Imperium, a source of alien magic. After finding out Astra is training with Crowley, Constantine attempts to convince her to quit. During the argument, Astra gives Crowley control of his body. When the Legends arrive at the manor, Astra transforms them into household objects, and when Astra tries to stop Crowley from usurping Truss's and the Legends' souls, he betrays her and transforms everyone into cartoon characters. Astra uses a spell created by her mother, Natalie, to remove all magic, which re-traps Crowley and restores everyone to their bodies, but also depowers everyone of their magic, including herself and Constantine. Now powerless, him and Astra decided to begin anew.

Meanwhile in space, Sara Lance meets Bishop, her kidnapper and inventor of the AVA clones. After healing Sara, Bishop claims that human greed doomed Earth, that he intends to restart humanity using alien DNA, and that he wants Sara to teach them strength. Sara recruits an AVA to help her flee; however, the clone betrays her and leads Bishop to her ship. After managing to kill Bishop, she is knocked out only to meet him again back at his lair.

== Production ==
In April 2021, co-showrunner Phil Klemmer explained that the concept of a part-animated episode in season six began as a joke: "The reason we did that originally is that we broke it as live-action, and then there's a point in the story where it becomes so outlandish that I was really having a difficult time seeing it in my head as live-action. I was like, 'Guys, this feels like a '90s Disney movie.' It was sort of a joke". "The Satanist's Apprentice" was written by co-showrunner Keto Shimizu and Ray Utarnachitt.

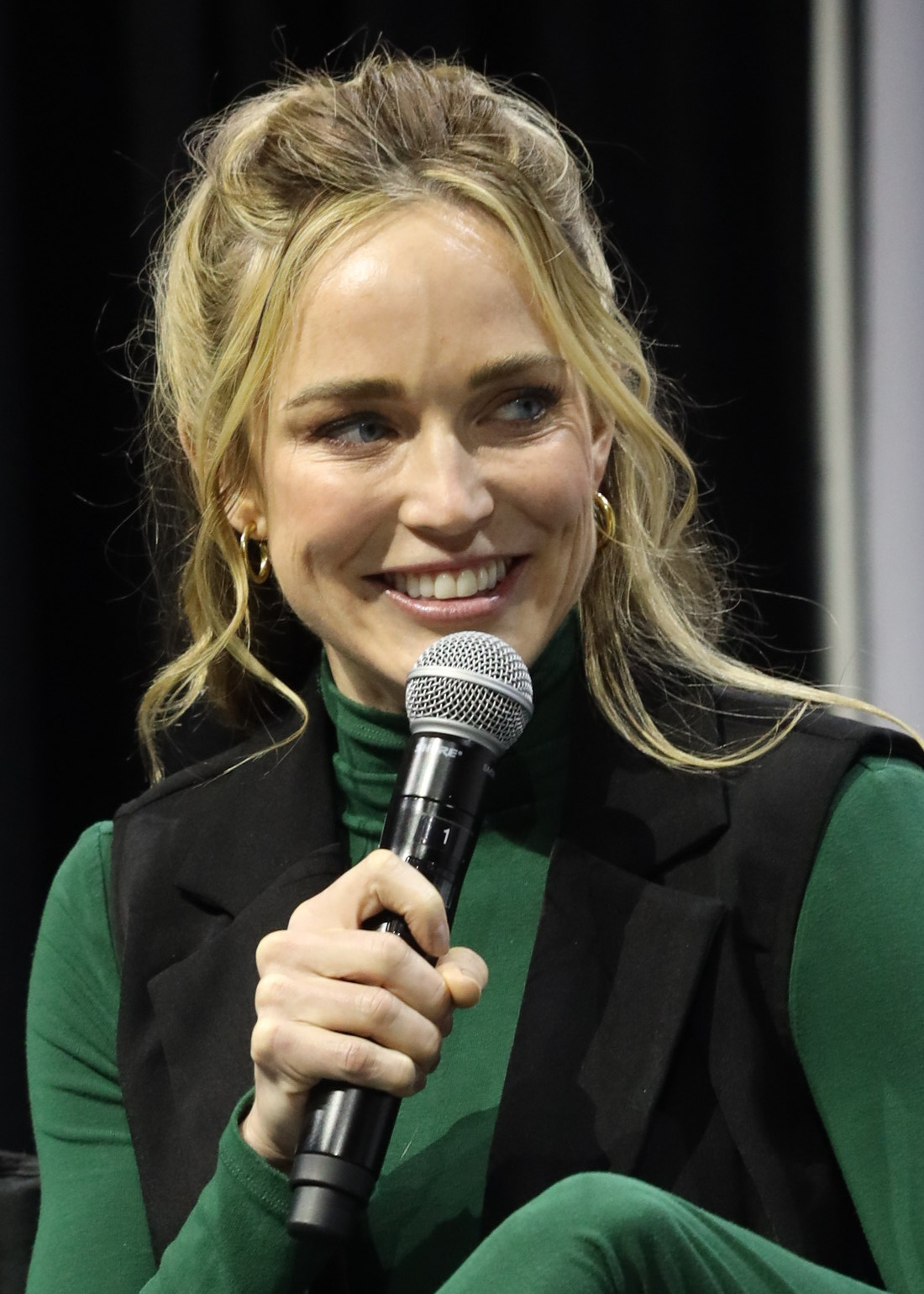
The episode was directed by series lead Caity Lotz

The title of the episode, "The Satanist's Apprentice", is a pun on The Sorcerer's Apprentice, a poem by Johann Wolfgang von Goethe. Klemmer said the focus of the episode would be Astra Logue, portrayed by Olivia Swann, and that she would serve as the episode's version of a Disney Princess. The episode follows two parallel storylines, Astra's storyline at John Constantine's manor, and Sara Lance / White Canary's storyline in Bishop's lair, which Lotz felt "didn't go together" tonally, since they were extremely different from each other. Speaking with Entertainment Weekly, Lotz stated she considered it challenging to ensure they fitted together so that "it still felt like you were watching the same show". The episode references the SyFy television series Wynonna Earp. Wynonna Earp had previously featured a reference to Legends of Tomorrow.

The episode stars Swann as Astra Logue, alongside Lotz, Tala Ashe, Jes Macallan, Shayan Sobhian, Lisseth Chavez, Nick Zano, and Matt Ryan as Sara Lance, Zari Tarazi, Ava Sharpe, Behrad Tarazi, Spooner Cruz, Nate Heywood, and John Constantine respectively. They all, with the exception of Lotz, whose character was not animated, serve as the voice actor for their respective character. Additionally, Macallan also portrays Bishop's AVA clones. Raffi Barsoumian appears in a recurring role as Bishop, the primary villain of season six. Matt Lucas guest stars as the voice of Aleister Crowley.

=== Filming and visual effects ===
The episode was directed by series lead Caity Lotz. It was the second episode of the series to be directed by Lotz after the season five episode "Mortal Khanbat". Filming for the episode began on December 8, 2020, and ended by December 18. The opening scene where a car splashes water on Astra was not included in the original script; it was originally intended for simply rain to feature in the scene, but Lotz wanted a "waterfall" to hit Astra, saying, "One-hundred percent! More water! Make it a bigger splash!". She also sought to make the opening montage, depicting Astra's everyday life, in the style of a romantic comedy. Since Lotz had no experience with animation, she collaborated with Tony Cervone, who has worked as the animation director on various projects for Warner Bros. Animation. She said the episode was easier to direct than "Mortal Khanbat", her directorial debut, as that episode relied heavily on practical effects and stunts, whereas this was more of a "mind challenge". Swann wanted Astra's freckles be retained when she enters her animated avatar, and for her animated skin tone to match her real skin tone. Since the original script mentions that the animated Astra speaks with a "Snow White cadence", Swann watched 1937 Disney animated film Snow White and the Seven Dwarfs achieve this. However, she settled on a speaking style that helped everyone "make sure it was still Astra," who Swann said was nothing like a Disney princess.

== Release ==
"The Satanist's Apprentice" was first aired in the United States on The CW on June 6, 2021. It was watched by a live audience of 420 thousand viewers with a 0.1% share among adults aged 18 to 49. It was the lowest-viewed broadcast in its 8 PM timeslot. Additionally, it was the lowest-viewed broadcast on both The CW, behind an episode of Batwoman, and the night overall. It had the same viewership numbers as the previous episode, "Bay of Squids", and slightly more than the following episode, "Bishop's Gambit". When including DVR viewership, it was seen by an additional 398 thousand viewers, for a total 818 thousand.

=== Critical reception ===
The episode received generally positive reviews from critics. Writing for Screen Rant, Bruno Savill De Jong wrote, "This is the outlandish, anything-goes storytelling that Legends of Tomorrow revels in". He praised the animated format and the animation itself for their "softness" and "fluidity", adding that the episode "advances the main plot but mostly allows a character-focused episode on Astra". However, he criticized the episode's plot as "predictable", although he still found it enjoyable. Savill De Jong also noted parallels between Sara and Astra's arcs. Allison Shoemaker of The A.V. Club rated the episode A−, she praised the contrast of the two storylines and the feeling of isolation created by the limited number of actors in every scene. Shoemaker praised the performance of Lotz, Swann, and Ryan, adding that it was one of Swann's best performances. However, despite enjoying the episode, she felt it was not as cohesive as "Mortal Khanbat", also directed by Lotz. Den of Geek's Jim Dandeneau felt the episode was mostly good writing "About 90% of "The Satanist’s Apprentice" is an all-time classic episode of Legends of Tomorrow". However, he felt the inconsistent characterization of Constantine dragged the quality down, he noted possible political undertones in his actions. In a review for Game Rant, Bruno Savil de Jong praised the episode, writing that, while predictable, "the accompanying ambitious flourishes of the episode make “The Satanist’s Apprentice” a highpoint of an already solid season." In 2024, Emma Singer of Comic Book Resources labeled the episode "Peak of the Series' Weirdness".
