= Swan Thong =

- Legends of Tomorrow episode
- Episode no.: Season 5 Episode 14
- Directed by: Kevin Mock
- Written by: Keto Shimizu; Morgan Faust
- Production code: T13.21915
- Original air date: June 2, 2020

Guest appearances
- Shayan Sobhian as Behrad Tarazi; Adam Tsekhman as Gary Green; Joanna Vanderham as Atropos; Mina Sundwall as Lita; Alice Hunter as Natalie Logue; Sarah Strange as Lachesis; Jack Gillett as Declan; Sisqó as himself; Ramona Young as Mona Wu

Episode chronology
← Previous "The One Where We're Trapped on TV"	Next → "Ground Control to Sara Lance"
- Legends of Tomorrow season 5

"Swan Thong" is the fourteenth episode and final episode of the fifth season and 82nd overall of the American science fiction television series Legends of Tomorrow, revolving around the eponymous team of superheroes and their time travelling adventures. It is set in the Arrowverse, sharing continuity with the other television series of the universe. The episode was written by showrunner Keto Shimizu and Morgan Faust; it was directed by Kevin Mock. It first premiered on The CW on June 2, 2020, to an audience of 725 thousand live viewers with an additional 530 thousand DVR viewers.

"Swan Thong" features the Legends restoring the original timeline and defeating the Fates. It was praised by critics, particularly the departure of Maisie Richardson-Sellers as Charlie in the closing moments. The episode features a cameo by rapper Sisqó who performs his 2000 single, "Thong Song".

== Plot ==
After reality has been altered, (Note: As depicted in "The One Where We're Trapped on TV") Charlie leaves the Legends and rules with her sisters Atropos and Lachesis, albeit with regret. After the Legends, along with an alternate version of Zari Tarazi, infiltrate the Fates' temple, Sara Lance kills Atropos by throwing her into the Loom of Fate, destroying it in the process. As a result, Atropos' alterations to the timeline are undone and Sara regains her sight. The Legends then flee Lachesis, using the Waverider to travel four months into the future. However, they discover Lachesis rebuilt the Loom as a smartwatch app and imprisoned Charlie in The Museum of Bad Ideas. Charlie has been convinced that everything wrong with humanity is her fault. They free Charlie and return to the Waverider. Freeing her and taking her back to the Waverider, there they learn the Loom really is destroyed and Lachesis is using both the app and the AI Gideon as a cover. Mick Rory and his daughter Lita help inspires Charlie to rejoin the Legends. With Charlie's help, they shut down Lachesis' app and kill the final Encores at the museum. Realizing Lachesis is human without the Loom, Charlie forgives her and tells her to live the one life she has. Zari Tomaz realizes her presence is causing a paradox which is slowly killing her brother Behrad, so she departs. Astra Logue, now freed from the influence of the Fates, moves in with John Constantine. After the Legends return to 1970s London, Charlie departs the team to live a more peaceful life. Unbeknownst to the team, Sara is abducted by aliens.

== Production ==
"Swan Thong" was written by co-showrunner Keto Shimizu and Morgan Faust. Shimizu and Faust finished the production draft on January 13, 2020. The second and third versions of the script were finished on January 14 and 15, 2020. The fourth and final version was completed on January 16, the final day of preparation. Several alternative titles for the episode were considered including, "The Hateful Fates", "One Mans Trash...", and "Fight at the Museum." The final version of the title is a reference to Sisqó's "Thong Song". To set up the upcoming sixth season, the episode featured a cliffhanger ending with Sara Lance getting abducted by aliens.

The closing moment of the episode features a punk rock version of the song "Mister Parkers Cul de Sac". The song, written by staff writer James Eagan, had previously appeared in an episode of the same name. The song was chosen as it talked about friendships. Co-showrunner Phil Klemmer told Entertainment Weekly that "I guess it encapsulates our show. Like a punk song, it sounds brash and kind of cacophonous, but if you listen a little bit more closely the lyrics are just about [how] circles are like friendships that never end. That's Charlie basically screaming she's gonna remain a Legend forever." Tala Ashe appears as both Zari Tomaz and Zari Tarazi in the episode. However, due to technical constraints it was decided that this would be only temporary and that one of the two Zari's had to be written out. Tarazi was chosen to stay as the writers wanted to maintain the sibling dynamic between her and Behrad Tarazi. The episode was written knowing Richard-Sellers would not be returning for the sixth season and therefore had to conclude Charlie's character arc.

=== Casting ===
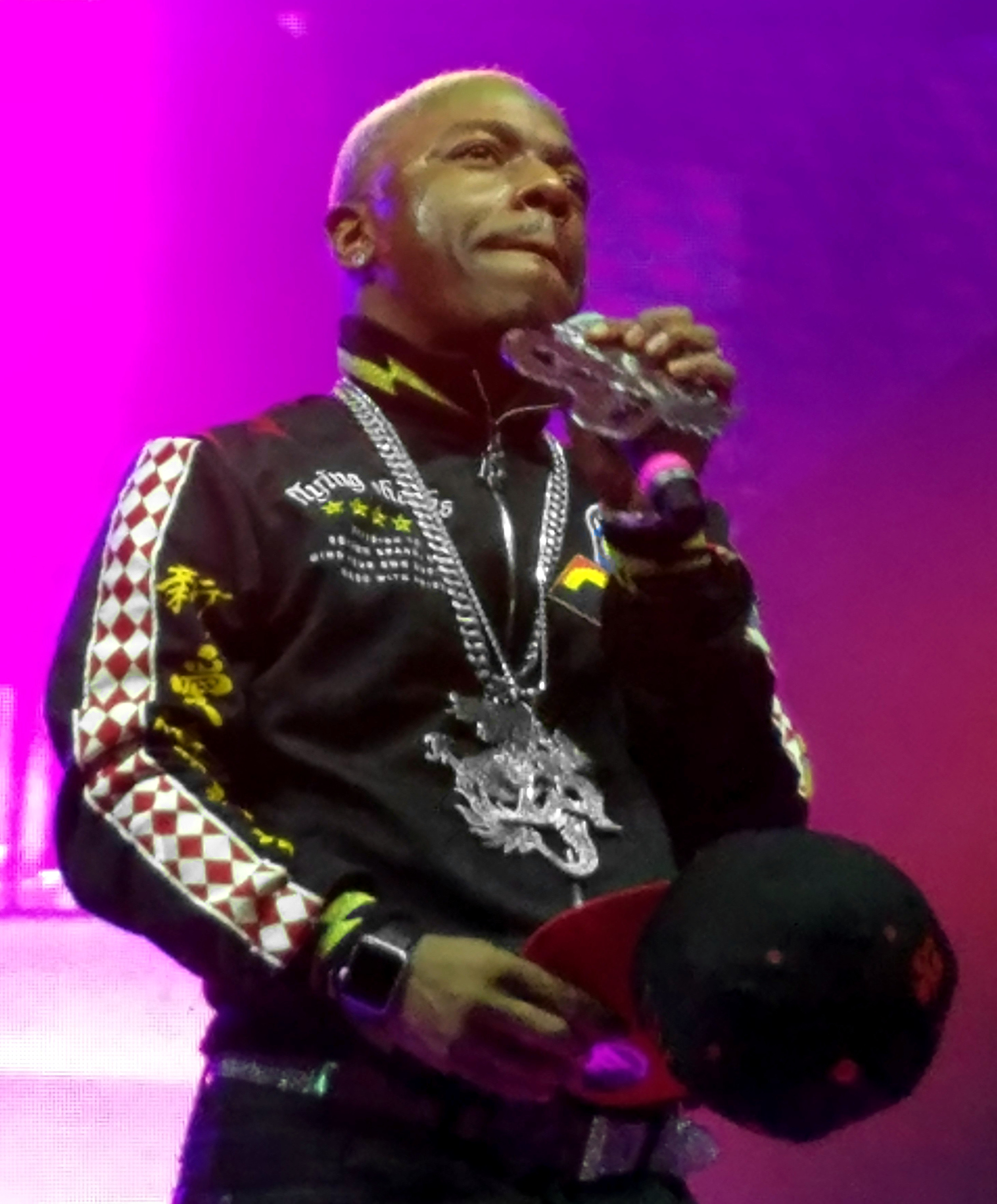
Sisqó is an American rapper who performs his song, "Thong Song"; the song is the inspiration for the episode's title.

The episode stars Maisie Richardson-Sellers, Caity Lotz, Tala Ashe, Jes Macallan, Nick Zano, Matt Ryan, Dominic Purcell, Amy Louise Pemberton, Courtney Ford, and Olivia Swann as Charlie, Sara Lance, Zari Tarazi, Ava Sharpe, Nate Haywood, John Constantine, Mick Rory, Gideon (voice), Marie Antoinette, and Astra Louge. Additionally, Tala Ashe portrays Zari Tomaz, the version of Zari that was part of the Legends prior to the events of the season four finale, "Hey, World!".

This is the final episode of Legends of Tomorrow to feature Maisie Richardson-Sellers and Courtney Ford as a series regulars. Richardson-Sellers left the show to work on her career as a filmmaker, with her first directing credit being the short film "Sunday's Child". Both Richardson-Sellers and Ford eventually returned to Legends of Tomorrow. Richardson-Sellers as a director, directing the episodes "There Will be Brood" and "The Fixed Point". Ford as Nora Darhk in the 100th episode, "wvrdr_error_100<oest-of-th3-gs.gid30n> not found".

This is the final episode to guest star Shayan Sobhian as Behrad Tarazi and Adam Tsekhman as Gary Green as the two were both promoted to series regulars for the remainder of the show. Former series regular Ramona Young guest stars as Mona Wu, this is her final appearance as the character. American rapper Sisqó makes a guest star appearance as himself as part of an exhibit in the "Museum of Bad Ideas". He was Klemmer's first choice for the cameo, however he did not ask him until four days before filming began.

=== Filming ===
"Swan Thong" was directed by Kevin Mock. The episode entered preparation on January 8, 2020, and ended on the 16th. Shooting began the next day and ran until January 29, 2020. A scene featuring a same-sex kiss between Charlie and Zari, the pairing being a popular ship by fans of the series, was shot. However, the scene was cut as it didn't fit the tone of the episode. Both Richard-Seller and Shimizu stated that the cast and crew were in favor of keeping the scene but concluded that it did not work well emotionally. Ashe appearing as both versions of Zari simultaneously was achieved through using motion capture and split screens.

== Release ==
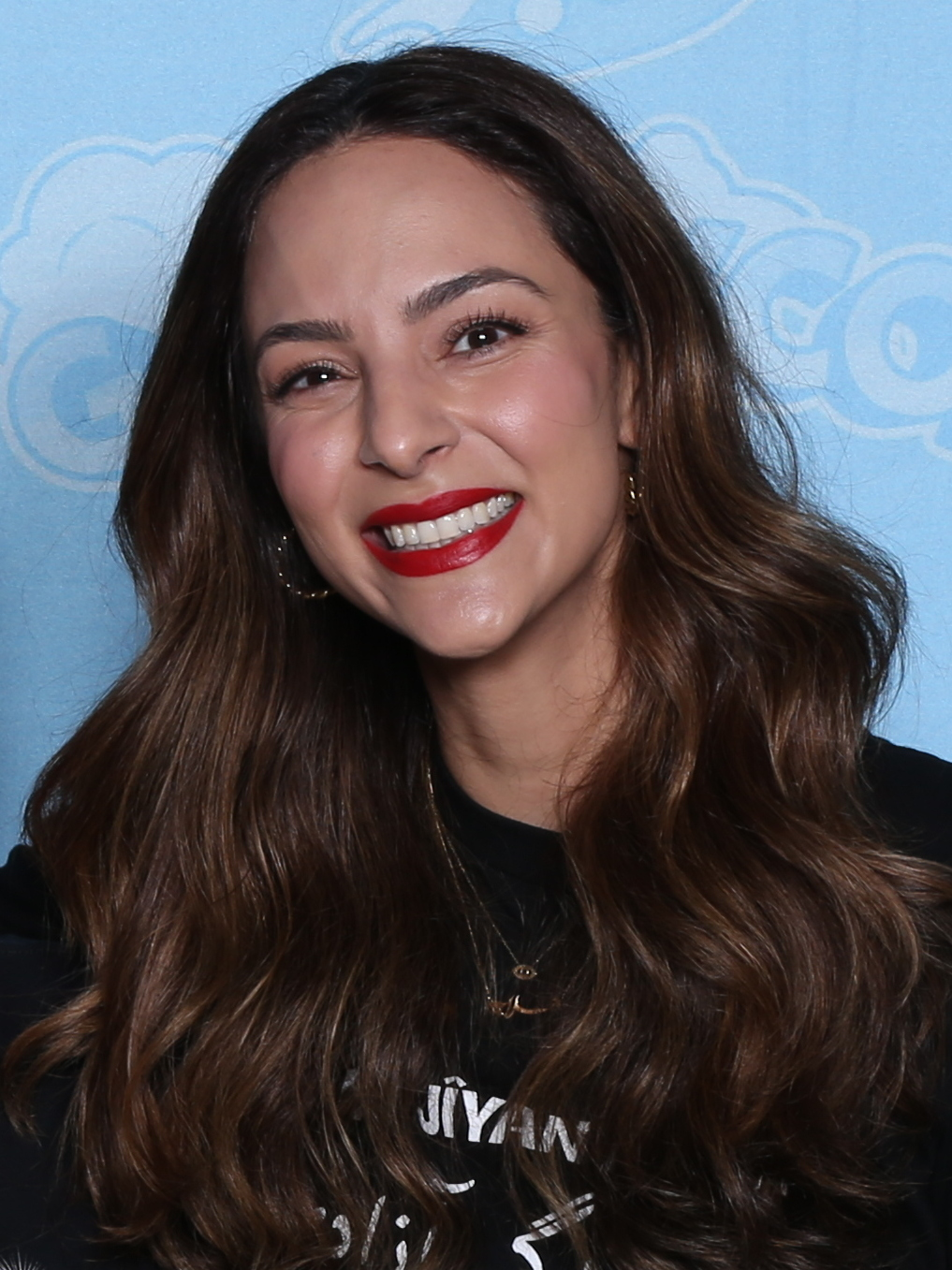
Ashe's performance was praised by critics, who noted the emotion in her characters exit.

"Swan Thong" was first broadcast in the United States on The CW on June 2, 2020. The trailer was released on May 26, 2020. It originally aired to an audience of 725,000 live viewers with a .17 percent share among adults 18–49, a slight decrease from the previous episode, "The One Where We're Trapped on TV". "Swan Thong" was viewed by around 35,000 less viewers that "The One Where We're Trapped on TV". When accounting for seven-day DVR viewership the episode was seen by an additional 530,000 people for a total of 1.26 million viewers. It was the eighth most viewed of the season when only counting live viewership.

=== Critical reception ===
Allison Shoemaker of The A.V. Club rated the episode a B+. She found the episode "reasonable satisfying", praising the "heart breaking moments" and the musical number. However, Shoemaker found herself disappointed with the episodes moments of "hesitation", instead choosing to "not pull on threads". She praised Richardson-Sellers performance as Charlie calling her exit "top notch" but noting that certain scenes "lacked gravitas" leaving heart-felt moments, empty. Jim Dandeneau of Den of Geek found the exit of Zari Tomaz to be one of the best moments calling it "beautifully acted" and labeling Tala Ashe the "MVP" of the season. Dandeneau called Zari Tomaz's exit one of the episodes best moments, describing a bittersweet feeling as "Nate had yet another love interest ripped from him". Writing for Entertainment Weekly, Sydney Bucksbaum wrote "This week, Legends of Tomorrow ended season 5 with a finale full of shocking, heartbreaking goodbyes, insanely wacky action sequences, and an exciting tease for season 6."
