= The Good, the Bad and the Cuddly (Legends of Tomorrow) =

- Legends of Tomorrow episode
- The Legends battle Mallus (right) using a giant Beebo doll (left)
- Episode no.: Season 3 Episode 18
- Directed by: Dermott Downs
- Written by: Marc Guggenheim; Phil Klemmer
- Production code: T13.20618
- Original air date: April 9, 2018

Guest appearances
- Neal McDonough as Damien Darhk; Arthur Darvill as Rip Hunter; Franz Drameh as Jefferson "Jax" Jackson; Matt Ryan as John Constantine; Courtney Ford as Nora Darhk; Jes Macallan as Ava Sharpe; Tracy Ifeachor as Kuasa / Vixen; John Noble as the voice of Mallus; Adam Tsekhman as Gary Green; Johnathon Schaech as Jonah Hex; Jonathan Cake as Blackbeard; Bar Paly as Helen of Troy; Katia Winter as Freydís Eiríksdóttir; Simon Merrells as Julius Caesar

Episode chronology
| ← Previous "Guest Starring John Noble" | Next → "The Virgin Gary" |
- Legends of Tomorrow season 3

"The Good, The Bad, and the Cuddly" is the eighteenth and final episode of the third season of the American television series Legends of Tomorrow. The series revolves around the eponymous team of superheroes and their time-traveling adventures. It is set in the Arrowverse, sharing continuity with the other television series of the universe. The episode was written by Marc Guggenheim and Phil Klemmer and directed by Dermott Downs.

In "The Good, the Bad and the Cuddly", the Legends attempt to defeat the demon Mallus (John Noble) but fail and flee to the Old West. In the Old West, they fight an army assembled by Mallus, before using mystical artifacts known as "totems" to form a giant blue doll known as Beebo to fight and kill Mallus. It first aired on The CW on April 9, 2018, to an audience of 1.41 million viewers, with an additional 740 thousand watching on DVR. It was met with generally positive reviews from critics who enjoyed its silliness.

== Plot ==
After being freed, the demon Mallus demands that the Legends hand over the six totems, the items that are key to killing him. Rip Hunter sacrifices himself to allow the team to flee Zambesi, arriving in the town Salvation, North Dakota in the Old West. While they strategize, an army of Romans, Vikings, and pirates, many of whom have fought the Legends before, are summoned by Mallus. He threatens to destroy the town unless the Legends surrender the totems by noon. The Legends attempt to use the totems to form a "champion" to kill Mallus, but due to Sara Lance's hesitation to use the Death Totem, the champion is deformed. Meanwhile, Ray Palmer and Damien Darhk, travel to Zambesi, just prior to Mallus' release, to rescue Damien's daughter Nora, whose body is being possessed by Mallus. Damien frees Nora and takes her place; Mallus is freed regardless, killing Damien.

In the Old West, the Legends contact various allies from across time including, Jonah Hex, Helen of Troy, Kuasa, and former Legend Jefferson Jackson. Together they save the town from the army. After the deadline expires, Mallus arrives for the totems. However, Sara, Mick Rory, Amaya Jiwe, Nate Heywood, Zari Tomaz, and Wally West, successfully combine the totems' energies to form a large Beebo doll. With their creation they fight and kill Mallus. The Time Bureau arrives to assist cleaning up Salvation. They arrest Nora for working with Mallus, but Ray helps her escape so she can have a new life without Damien's influence. Amaya departs the Legends before they return to 2018 Aruba. However, they are interrupted when John Constantine arrives, revealing that Mallus is not the only demon who escaped.

== Production ==
"The Good, The Bad, and the Cuddly" was written by series co-creators Phil Klemmer and Marc Guggenheim, and directed by Dermott Downs. The episode is a western; it is named after the 1966 film The Good, the Bad and the Ugly, a Spaghetti Western by Sergio Leone. It stars Caity Lotz, Brandon Routh, Tala Ashe, Dominic Purcell, Keiynan Lonsdale, Maisie Richardson-Sellers, and Nick Zano as Sara Lance, Ray Palmer, Zari Tomaz, Mick Rory, Wally West, Amaya Jiwe, and Nate Haywood, respectively. It is the final episode to feature Lonsdale as he did not return for the fourth season. Additionally, it is the last episode to feature Richardson-Sellers as Amaya, she returned the following season as a new character. "The Good, the Bad and the Cuddly" featured the return of Beebo, a blue doll inspired by Tickle Me Elmo. Beebo was originally introduced during the season three mid-season finale. Critic Oliver Sava noted similarities between the giant Beebo and the Stay Puft Marshmallow Man from Ghostbusters.

On the set, the cast decided to recreate the music video for the Will Smith song "Wild Wild West". It was second time they did so following their recreation of "Stayin' Alive" on the set of "Here I Go Again".

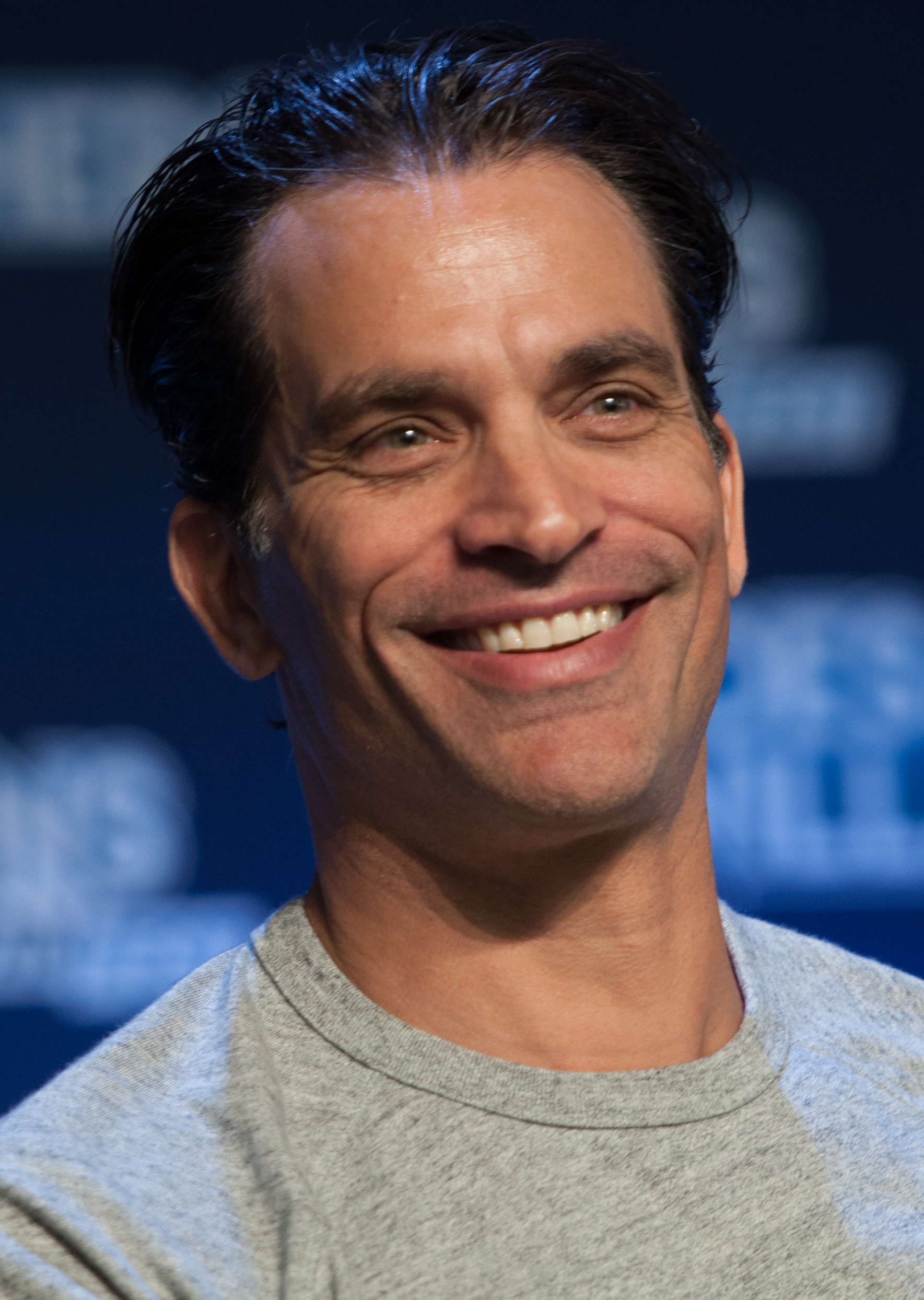
Johnathon Schaech reprises his role as Jonah Hex

The episode featured the return of several guest stars including Johnathon Schaech as Jonah Hex, Matt Ryan as John Constantine, and Bar Paly as Helen of Troy. Prior to the episode both Schaech and Klemmer stated they were interested in Jonah Hex returning to the series. In an interview with ComicBook.com, Schaech stated he was interested in exploring Hex's take on social issues saying "I think Jonah has a lot to say about a lot of things that we're dealing with. He's a very masculine man, but he's been through enough to understand a lot of what goes on inside. So anything in history, like what we're dealing with today with our racism problems." After Lonsdale released an image of the episode's Old West set on social media, fans began to speculate Hex would be featured in the episode. On February 20, 2018, Schaech was spotted on the set of Legends of Tomorrow, his return was officially confirmed the following day. Ryan appeared to tease plotlines for season four. The following season, he was promoted to series regular. Additionally, former series regulars Franz Drameh and Arthur Darvill return; Drameh had previously departed in the midseason finale, "Beebo the God of War", and Darvill had recurred throughout the season.

== Release ==
"The Good, the Bad and the Cuddly" was first released on The CW on April 9, 2018. It was seen by an audience of 1.41 million viewers, with a 0.4/2 percent share among adults 18–49, 180 thousand more than the previous episode, "Guest Starring John Noble". "The Good, the Bad and the Cuddly" was the least viewed broadcast in its 8 PM timeslot, behind episodes of The Voice, American Idol, Kevin Can Wait, and a rerun of Lucifer, and the second lowest of the night overall. However, it was the highest viewed broadcast on The CW, ahead of an episode of iZombie. It was seen by an additional 740 thousand viewers on DVR for a total of 2.16 million. Prior to its release, Guggenheim told Entertainment Weekly he was proud of the third season's conclusion stating, "I think we achieve peak Legends in the last two episodes".

=== Critical reception ===
"The Good, the Bad and the Cuddly" received generally positive reviews from critics, who enjoyed its whimsey and silliness. In particular, the fight between Beebo and Mallus was highly praised by critics. ComicBook.com's Jenna Anderson named it the tenth best scene from Legends of Tomorrow's third season. TVLine's Rebecca Luther included the fight in her list of the "Funniest TV Moments of 2018". Collider's Liz Shannon Miller called the episode's title "hella charming". Oliver Sava of The A.V. Club labeled the scene the best part of the episode, stating it had some of the best choreography of the series.

Jim Dandeneau, writing for Den of Geek, praised the finale finding it to be hilarious and exciting him for the following season. Despite liking it himself, he noted Rip's death scene would feel "cheap" to casual viewers of the show. Dandeneau enjoyed the use of Jonah Hex and Damien Darhk, two characters who he previously disliked. He graded it 5/5 stars. Sava graded the episode an "A". He commended the conclusion of Rip and Damien's arcs and how they blended with the comedic portions, writing "the astronomically high stakes don't get in the way of the delightful tone".

Not all reviews were positive, IGN's Jesse Schedeen felt the episode was among the weakest of the season. While he noted there was some character moments, he believed Mallus being an underwhelming villain hurt both the episode and the season as a whole, writing, "Thanks to a bland main villain, Legends of Tomorrow ended its third season on a relative weak note." However, he did enjoy the conclusions to the various character arcs, particularly Rip's death scene and Amaya's departure. Schedeen graded the episode a 6.9/10. In another article for ComicBook.com, Anderson listed both "Guest Starring John Noble" and "The Good, the Bad and the Cuddly" on her list of the best 2018 Arrowverse episodes, praising its action sequences.
