= Legends of Tomorrow =

2016 American superhero television series

- Genre: Action; Comedy drama; Science fiction; Superhero; Time travel
- Based on: Characters from DC Comics
- Developed by: Greg Berlanti; Marc Guggenheim; Andrew Kreisberg; Phil Klemmer
- Showrunners: Phil Klemmer; Marc Guggenheim; Keto Shimizu
- Starring: Victor Garber; Brandon Routh; Arthur Darvill; Caity Lotz; Franz Drameh; Ciara Renée; Falk Hentschel; Amy Pemberton; Dominic Purcell; Wentworth Miller; Matt Letscher; Maisie Richardson-Sellers; Nick Zano; Tala Ashe; Keiynan Lonsdale; Jes Macallan; Matt Ryan; Ramona Young; Courtney Ford; Olivia Swann; Adam Tsekhman; Shayan Sobhian; Lisseth Chavez
- Composers: Blake Neely; Daniel James Chan
- Country of origin: United States
- Original language: English
- No. of seasons: 7
- No. of episodes: 110 (list of episodes)

Production
- Executive producers: Chris Fedak; Sarah Schechter; Phil Klemmer; Keto Shimizu; Andrew Kreisberg; Marc Guggenheim; Greg Berlanti
- Producers: Grainne Godfree; Sarah Nicole Jones; Glen Winter; Vladimir Stefoff
- Production location: Vancouver, British Columbia
- Cinematography: David Geddes; Mahlon Todd Williams
- Editors: Kevin Mock; Andrew Kasch
- Camera setup: Single-camera
- Running time: 42–45 minutes
- Production companies: Berlanti Productions; DC Entertainment; Bonanza Productions; Warner Bros. Television

Original release
- Network: The CW
- Release: January 21, 2016 – March 2, 2022

Related
- Arrowverse

DC's Legends of Tomorrow, or simply Legends of Tomorrow, is an American time travel superhero television series developed by Greg Berlanti, Marc Guggenheim, Andrew Kreisberg, and Phil Klemmer, who are also executive producers along with Sarah Schechter and Chris Fedak; Klemmer and Fedak originally served as showrunners, while Keto Shimizu became co-showrunner with Klemmer starting with the fourth season. The series, based on the characters of DC Comics, premiered on The CW on January 21, 2016, and ran for seven seasons until March 2, 2022, before its cancellation on April 29. It is a spin-off set in the Arrowverse and features characters introduced in Arrow and The Flash, along with new characters.

While the first season received mixed reviews, the series enjoyed improved reception in subsequent seasons, which saw a shift in tone, as well as frequent changes to both the setting, themes, and cast of characters as the show went on. Originally premiering as a self-serious superhero drama where heroes battle high stakes throughout time, the consensus of critics was that the show found its feet as a more light-hearted DC series associated with meta-humor, social commentary, and the greater creative freedom afforded to its cast of mainly lesser-known or wholly original characters.

== Series overview ==
In season one, Time Master Rip Hunter goes rogue after the immortal tyrant Vandal Savage conquered Earth and killed his wife and son, in what would be the future. Meanwhile, the organization he swore himself to, turns on him. Intending to save humanity and avenge his family, Rip recruits a team of superheroes and villains, consisting of Ray Palmer / the Atom, Sara Lance / White Canary, Martin Stein and Jefferson "Jax" Jackson / Firestorm, Kendra Saunders / Hawkgirl, Carter Hall / Hawkman, Leonard Snart / Captain Cold, and Mick Rory / Heat Wave, who venture through time on a stolen time ship, the Waverider, to stop Savage's rise to power. Meanwhile, the Time Masters send Chronos after Rip for interfering with the timeline and in the season's final episodes it turns out that the Time Masters were working with Savage all along, as his reign will eventually successfully counter an upcoming Thanagarian invasion of Earth. Snart also sacrifices himself to destroy the Time Masters.

In season two, following Snart's sacrifice while defeating the Time Masters, Rip goes missing and Sara takes charge of the team who continue protecting the timeline from aberrations. They are joined by historian Nate Heywood / Citizen Steel, who later gains the ability to turn to steel at will, and Justice Society of America member Amaya Jiwe / Vixen, who joins the Legends to pursue Eobard Thawne / Reverse-Flash, a speedster and Barry Allen's archenemy. After learning of the Spear of Destiny, an ancient artifact that can rewrite reality, Thawne recruits Damien Darhk, Malcolm Merlyn, as well as a time-displaced Snart, from different points in time to form the Legion of Doom. However, after retrieving the Spear, Sara successfully defeats Thawne and the Legion is returned to their proper times.

In season three, Rip forms the Time Bureau to replace the Time Masters and fires the Legends for causing anachronisms. When Bureau agent Ava Sharpe is captured, Rip is forced to take the Legends out of retirement. Elsewhere, the demonic entity Mallus forms a cult led by Darhk's daughter Nora, pursuing the six totems of Zambesi, two of which are wielded by Amaya and near-future hacktivist Zari Tomaz. The Legends, assisted by speedster Wally West, retrieve all the totems and use them to defeat Mallus.

In season four, after Rip's sacrifice during the fight against Mallus, occult detective John Constantine informs the Legends that Mallus was not the only demon that escaped and that "magical fugitives" are on the loose. John joins the team, along with shapeshifter Charlie and Mona Wu, who is host to a Kaupe, to stop them. Ava and Sara and Ray and Nora begin relationships, and Nora becomes a fairy godmother. The Legends come into conflict with the demon Neron, who was banished by John during a show at Heyworld intended to help humans be less afraid of the magical creatures. In addition, Neron manipulates Time Bureau member Gary Green into working for him. Following Neron's defeat, Zari's timeline changes and she is replaced as a Legend and wielder of the Air Totem by her brother Behrad.

In season five, Astra Logue, whom John accidentally sent to Hell in a botched exorcism, has resurrected evil individuals from history known as "Encores". Meanwhile, Charlie is revealed to be Clotho of the three Fates who is being pursued by her sisters to recover the Loom of Fate. Mona, Ray, Nora, and Charlie leave the Legends, who defeat the Fates and Encores. Astra joins the Legends, with John offering to be a roommate at his house and a mentor to her. Sara is captured by a mysterious beam.

In season six, it is revealed that Sara was kidnapped by Gary and his fiancé Kayla, who are both aliens. Sara's alien abduction was orchestrated by a scientist named Bishop, who created the Avas. He plans to create the perfect warrior by copying Sara's DNA and memories and combining it with other aliens upon claiming that he has seen the end of the human race. While attempting to escape her imprisonment, Sara accidentally releases a menagerie of aliens throughout the timeline, including Kayla, whom Mick becomes romantically involved with. To find Sara, the Legends enlist Esperanza "Spooner" Cruz, an off-the-grid recluse who can telepathically communicate with aliens following her own abduction, as they repel alien invasions throughout Earth's history. Bishop then goes after the Fountain of Imperium that would restore Constantine's powers, only to double-cross him and destroy it so that the Zagurons would invade Earth, but the Legends revive it and defeat Bishop with help from Bishop's younger counterpart. Mick, who now has several kids with Kayla, decides to leave the Legends. A duplicate Waverider destroys the original, stranding the Legends in 1925 Texas.

In the seventh and final season, the Legends work to find a way back to their own time. While Astra unknowingly gives Gideon a human form, the Legends make their way to New York City to seek out scientist Gwyn Davies who was said to have invented a form of time travel. Meanwhile, a younger Bishop is revealed to have copied Gideon before being mind-wiped and regained some of his memories following a recurring dream. Having become a Time Master, Bishop starts to see that the Legends are not as bad as he thought as he goes against his Gideon copy. After Bishop's sacrifice, the Legends go up against their robot clones that Gideon created through a combination of Gideon's technology and Bishop's cloning technology. When the robot clones are defeated, the Legends work to save Gwyn's boyfriend Alun Thomas from being a casualty during World War I, while also dealing with a fixer named Mike who later makes off with the Waverider. Alun is saved at the cost of Nate's powers. He officially moves into Zari's totem to be with the original Zari. The Waverider returns where they find Mike on the bridge in handcuffs. The Legends are then arrested by the Time Police that Mike works for, as he is revealed to be Booster Gold.

== Episodes ==
Legends of Tomorrow series overview
| Season | Episodes | Originally released | | Rank | Average viewership (in millions) |
| Season | Episodes | First released | Last released | Rank | Average viewership (in millions) |
|---|---|---|---|---|---|
| 1 | 16 | January 21, 2016 | May 19, 2016 | 135 | 3.16 |
| 2 | 17 | October 13, 2016 | April 4, 2017 | 141 | 2.57 |
| 3 | 18 | October 10, 2017 | April 9, 2018 | 170 | 2.24 |
| 4 | 16 | October 22, 2018 | May 20, 2019 | 178 | 1.49 |
| 5 (Note: A total of 15 episodes were produced for the fifth season: a special episode for the "Crisis on Infinite Earths" crossover, which aired on January 14, 2020, before the season premiere, and another fourteen contributing towards the regular season, which officially premiered on January 21, 2020.) | Special | January 14, 2020 | | 122 | 1.35 |
| 5 | 14 | January 21, 2020 | June 2, 2020 | 122 | 1.35 |
| 6 | 15 | May 2, 2021 | September 5, 2021 | 149 | 0.82 |
| 7 | 13 | October 13, 2021 | March 2, 2022 | 127 | 0.86 |

== Cast and characters ==
- Caity Lotz as Sara Lance / White Canary:
  A Star City vigilante and former League of Assassins member suffering from rage issues after being resurrected by the mystical Lazarus Pit. In the second season, Sara becomes the leader of the Legends and captain of the Waverider. The character is partially based on the Black Canary and was introduced on Arrow.
- Brandon Routh as Ray Palmer / Atom (seasons 1–5; guest: season 7):
  A scientist, inventor, businessman and former CEO of Palmer Technologies who developed a power-suit that is now capable of size manipulation. In the fifth season, Ray chooses to leave the Legends to have a normal life with Nora after marrying her. The character was introduced on Arrow.
- Arthur Darvill as Rip Hunter (seasons 1–2; recurring: season 3; guest: season 7):
  A roguish time traveler and leader of the team, who hides the strains of being responsible for history itself behind a façade of charm and wit. His goal is to defeat Vandal Savage, his archenemy throughout time, in order to save the world and his family. Aiden Longworth portrays a young Rip Hunter. In the second season, Rip disappears and gives command of the Waverider to the Legends. He later returns, first as a film student in the 1960s who has no recollection of his past life, then as a brainwashed killer working for the Legion and later back to his original self. He remains with the team for a while but departs when he realizes that the Legends no longer need him as their captain. In the third season, he is the founder and leader of the Time Bureau. At the end of season three, Rip sacrifices himself in order for the Legends to escape from the time demon, Mallus.
- Victor Garber as Martin Stein / Firestorm (seasons 1–3; guest: season 7):
  A nuclear physicist focused on transmutation and also half of the superhero Firestorm with Jefferson Jackson. During "Crisis on Earth-X", he sacrifices himself to help the heroes escape Earth-X. Graeme McComb portrays a young Stein in the 1970s, 1980s, and 1990s. The character was introduced on The Flash.
- Franz Drameh as Jefferson "Jax" Jackson / Firestorm (seasons 1–3; guest: season 7):
  A former Central City high school athlete whose pro career was derailed by an injury and now works as an auto mechanic. He serves as the other half of the superhero Firestorm with Martin Stein. After Stein dies, Jax decides to leave the Waverider and return to the present as he is no longer a metahuman. The producers decided to create Jax as the other half of Firestorm to have him be someone in his early 20s and different from Ronnie Raymond's Firestorm, bringing comedy and camaraderie with Stein. The character was introduced on The Flash.
- Ciara Renée as Kendra Saunders / Hawkgirl (season 1):
  A young woman who is just beginning to learn that she has been repeatedly reincarnated over the centuries. When provoked, her ancient warrior persona manifests itself along with wings that grow out of her back. She chooses to leave the team at the end of the first season. Saunders is also known by her Egyptian name Chay-Ara, and Edith Boardman in the series. Anna Deavere Smith portrays an older Kendra in 1871, known as Cinnamon. The character was introduced on The Flash.
- Falk Hentschel as Carter Hall / Hawkman (season 1; guest: season 7):
  The latest reincarnation of the Egyptian prince Khufu who is fated to reincarnate throughout time along with his soulmate Kendra, with powers similar to hers. A reincarnated version is recruited by Vandal Savage where he is known as Scythian Torvil before remembering his life as Carter Hall. He chooses to leave the team at the end of the first season. Hall is also known by the name Joe Boardman in the series. Hentschel received guest credit in his subsequent appearances in season one after the character's death in "Pilot, Part 2." The character was introduced on The Flash.
- Amy Pemberton (Note: Starting in season 3, Pemberton is credited as Amy Louise Pemberton.) as Gideon:
  The artificial intelligence of the Waverider. Pemberton portrays a physical version of the character in the second-season episode, "Land of the Lost", the third-season episode "Here I Go Again", the fourth season episode "Legends of To-Meow-Meow", the fifth-season episode "I Am Legends", and in a regular capacity in season seven. An alternate version of Gideon (voiced by Morena Baccarin) was introduced in The Flash.
- Dominic Purcell as Mick Rory / Heat Wave (seasons 1–6):
  An arsonist, career criminal, and accomplice of Leonard Snart who, in contrast to his partner, uses a heat gun capable of burning almost anything. After being deserted in the past by Snart, he is recruited by the Time Masters and becomes the bounty hunter Chronos, who hunts the Legends, but later rejoins the team. Mitchell Kummen portrays a young Rory. The character was introduced on The Flash. Purcell exited the series as a regular cast member after the sixth season.
- Wentworth Miller as Leonard Snart / Captain Cold (season 1; recurring: season 2; guest: season 7) and Leo Snart / Citizen Cold (recurring: season 3):
  The son of a career criminal who turns to the quick and easy life of crime, and uses a cryonic gun to freeze objects and people on contact. Trestyn Zradicka portrays a young Leo. At the end of the first season, Snart sacrifices himself to save his team. In the second season, the Legion of Doom recruits a past version of Snart from before he joined the team with the promise of averting his future death. Following the Legion's defeat, Mick returns Snart to the exact moment where he was recruited by the Legion, wiping his memories in the process and ensuring that Snart will eventually join the Legends. During the "Crisis on Earth-X" event, a parallel universe version from Earth-X, Leonard "Leo" Snart is introduced; Leo temporarily joins the Legends. The character was introduced on The Flash.
- Matt Letscher as Eobard Thawne / Reverse-Flash (season 2; guest: season 7):
  A supervillain speedster from the future and the archenemy of the Flash. He is the leader of the Legion of Doom. His goal was to keep himself from being killed by Eddie Thawne back on The Flash. In the season two finale, he is defeated by the Legends and the Black Flash, apparently erasing Thawne from existence once again. The character was introduced on The Flash.
- Maisie Richardson-Sellers as Amaya Jiwe / Vixen (seasons 2–3) and Charlie / Clotho (seasons 4–5):
  A member of the Justice Society of America in the 1940s who is able to magically channel the abilities of the animal kingdom thanks to the mysterious Tantu Totem. She is the grandmother of Mari McCabe, who is portrayed by Megalyn Echikunwoke in other Arrowverse series. It was originally intended for the McCabe version of Vixen to be used in Legends as well, but Echikunwoke was unable to reprise the role due to previous commitments. At the end of season 3, she returns to Zambesi. Charlie is introduced in season 4 as a "magical fugitive who slips through" the rift the Waverider crew opened. She is a shapeshifter who takes the form of Amaya during a fight with the Legends in the hopes that they will not attack a friend. She is frozen into that shape during the encounter and captured by the Legends. She eventually gets her magical powers back, but continues to use Amaya's form. She is a formidable fighter and knows a great deal about the other magical fugitives.
- Nick Zano as Nate Heywood / Steel (seasons 2–7):
  A historian from Star City who gains the ability to transform himself into a steel-like form, and is the grandson of Commander Steel, a member of the Justice Society of America.
- Tala Ashe as Zari Tomaz (seasons 3–4; recurring: seasons 5–7) and Zari Tarazi (seasons 5–7):
  A computer hacker from the year 2042 who possesses aerokinetic powers from a mystical amulet. At the end of season four, the future where Zari came from changes, resulting in her disappearing and being replaced by her brother Behrad Tarazi with the Legends having no memory of her. In the new future, Zari is a socialite named Zari Tarazi, who eventually joins the Legends, wielding the air totem along with her brother, Behrad. The original Zari lives within the totem.
- Keiynan Lonsdale as Wally West / Kid Flash (season 3):
  A speedster from Keystone City, and later Central City, who was mentored by Barry Allen. He is the son of Joe West and the brother of Iris West, and looking for his place in the world. The character was introduced on The Flash.
- Jes Macallan as Ava Sharpe (seasons 4–7; recurring: season 3):
  The former Director of the Time Bureau and girlfriend of Sara Lance. In season three it is revealed that she is a clone from the year 2213. In season five, after the Time Bureau is shut down, she became a permanent member of the Legends, eventually becoming co-captain alongside Sara. In season 6, she marries Sara.
- Matt Ryan as John Constantine (seasons 4–6; recurring: season 3) and Gwyn Davies (season 7):
  An English magician/warlock, occult detective, and con man. Ryan is listed among the main cast but receives a special appearance credit. Ryan was announced as being promoted to a series regular for the fourth season ahead of its renewal, reprising his role as Constantine from the short-lived series Constantine. In season seven, Ryan portrayed a new character named Dr. Gwyn Davies, an eccentric scientist from the early 20th century.
- Courtney Ford as Nora Darhk (seasons 4–5; recurring: season 3; guest: season 7):
  The daughter of the deceased super-villain Damien Darhk and the love interest (later wife) of Ray Palmer. The character's younger self was introduced on Arrow.
- Ramona Young as Mona Wu (season 4; recurring: season 5):
  A young woman obsessed with fantasy novels who is "something of an expert in the world of the magical creatures that the Legends encounter". She works for the Time Bureau. She leaves the Waverider in season 5 to assume the Rebecca Silver pen name from Mick Rory.
- Olivia Swann as Astra Logue (seasons 5–7; guest: season 4)
  A woman damned to hell as a child following a botched exorcism by Constantine. Now an adult, she had become determined to rise to the top of hell's food chain. However, after helping the Legends defeat the Fates, Astra moves in to Constantine's house, and wants to try living a normal life on Earth.
- Adam Tsekhman as Gary Green (seasons 6–7; recurring: seasons 3–5):
  A Time Bureau Agent serving under Director Rip Hunter when it was founded with the goal of protecting and preserving the timeline. After Hunter is arrested and removed from office when he violates Time Bureau Code, Gary serves under Agent and later Director Ava Sharpe as her most loyal and often very obsessed Time Bureau Agent. After being easily manipulated by Director Sharpe, John Constantine, and the Legends, along with being mistreated by them, Gary betrays the team and joins Neron and Tabitha in their quest to bring the demons and the denizens of Hell over on Earth. However, after seeing that Neron and Tabitha do not care about him, Gary regrets his decision and rejoins the Legends; aiding them in destroying Neron and Tabitha for good. For his actions, Gary is made a part-time member of the Legends, and becomes John Constantine's sorcerer apprentice. Gary and Constantine continue to aid the Legends, joining up with them to rescue Astra Logue from Hell, and to stop the Encores and the evil Fates Lachesis and Atropos from enslaving humanity. When Charlie leaves the Legends after the defeat of Lachesis and Atropos, Gary is made a full time member of the Legends and rejoins them along with Constantine. In season six, Gary is revealed to be an alien of the Necrian species who uses his glasses to disguise himself as a human.
- Shayan Sobhian as Behrad Tarazi (seasons 6–7; recurring: season 5; guest: season 4):
  Zari Tomaz's deceased brother, who, during the season four finale, is resurrected, replacing Zari in the team after she alters the timeline. In season five, he is killed by Atropos, but resurrected once more, and is now a permanent wielder of the air totem along with his sister, Zari Tarazi, the version of Zari created when history was changed.
- Lisseth Chavez as Esperanza "Spooner" Cruz (seasons 6–7):
  Esperanza is a "tough and self-sufficient" woman who "lives off the grid, devising ingenious tech for the detection of – and defense against – space aliens [...] and while some might call her paranoid, she calls it being prepared. A survivor of a childhood alien encounter, Spooner now believes she has the ability to communicate telepathically with aliens".

LaMonica Garrett is credited as a main character in "Crisis on Infinite Earths: Part Five" for playing the Anti-Monitor, an evil being dedicated to ending the multiverse, and the polar opposite of Mar Novu / Monitor.

== Production ==
=== Development ===
In January 2015, co-creator Greg Berlanti stated that there were "very early" preliminary talks for an additional spin-off series centered on Ray Palmer/Atom (Brandon Routh), from Arrow and The Flash. In February 2015, it was reported that a spin-off series, described as a superhero team-up show, was in discussion by The CW for a possible 2015–16 midseason release. Berlanti, Andrew Kreisberg, Marc Guggenheim, and Sarah Schechter would serve as executive producers. The potential series would be headlined by several recurring characters from both Arrow and The Flash, including Palmer, Leonard Snart (Wentworth Miller), and Dr. Martin Stein (Victor Garber). Caity Lotz was also mentioned to be among the main cast. There would be potential for other Arrow/Flash characters to cross over to the new series, and the series would be casting "three major DC Comics characters who have never appeared in a TV series".

In March 2015, Stephen Amell, who portrays Oliver Queen/Green Arrow on Arrow, confirmed the series would air in the 2015–16 midseason. Additionally, Kreisberg stated more would be revealed about the nature of the series by the end of Arrow's third season, specifically why Lotz is slated to appear, given her previous character, Sara, was killed at the start of Arrow season three. Berlanti also stated there was a particular reason for the other half of Firestorm—Ronnie Raymond (Robbie Amell), as seen on The Flash—not being mentioned in the initial cast announcement. On the purpose of the series, Berlanti said it was designed to be "most similar to our crossover episodes, where you feel that 'event-iness', but all the time. For us, first and foremost, with all of [our shows], it's about 'how is it its own thing?' Because we don't just want to do it to do it." He also revealed the producers were focusing on "making sure that the villain that we have on [the] show is distinct too... another big character who hasn't been used yet." Also in March, Dominic Purcell was revealed to be reprising his role as Heat Wave in the series (noteworthy, reuniting Purcell with his Prison Break Co-Star Wentworth Miller), and Blake Neely, composer of Arrow and The Flash, would serve as composer. At the end of the month, Arthur Darvill was cast as Rip Hunter, one of the "new to TV" DC characters, while Ciara Renée was cast as Kendra Saunders / Hawkgirl. In April 2015, in a Variety article on the recent MipTV event, it noted the title for the series would be Legends of Tomorrow, despite it still being unconfirmed by those involved with the series. Also in the month, Franz Drameh was cast as Jax Jackson.

In May 2015, actor Victor Garber said that The CW was impressed with what was shown to them, giving the project a straight-to-series order. The network officially confirmed the order for the series on May 7, 2015, as well as the official title, DC's Legends of Tomorrow. Later in the month, it was confirmed that Lotz would reprise her role as Sara Lance, who would be taking the name White Canary, as well as revealing the antagonist as Vandal Savage. In June 2015, it was announced that Phil Klemmer had been made the series showrunner as well as executive producer; Chris Fedak serves as executive producer and co-showrunner with Klemmer. In July 2015, Klemmer and Guggenheim likened Legends of Tomorrow to an anthology series as "not everybody will be continuing on this journey", with each season being "its own separate movie" but not disconnected from each other in the manner of True Detective or American Horror Story. However, the anthology format was dropped, though the series did go through numerous changes in cast gradually. In August 2015, Casper Crump was cast as Vandal Savage.

On March 11, 2016, the series was renewed for a second season, which debuted in October 2016. The producers have considered adjusting the Legends team for additional seasons, with Joseph David-Jones' Connor Hawke and Megalyn Echikunwoke's Vixen potential additions. For the second season, Klemmer revealed that Arrow writer Keto Shimizu and The Flash writer Grainne Godfree would be working on Legends in order to "make our stories work in concert" with Arrow and The Flash. Klemmer also noted the challenges of creating more crossover elements, since Amell and Gustin work full days for their respective shows. In terms of working within the Arrowverse, Klemmer said that the death of Laurel Lance on Arrow would "resonate into Season 2... [since] something that happens on Arrow can create ripples that appear on our show in a huge way. It fundamentally alters the DNA of our series." The second season initially consisted of 13 episodes, with four more ordered in November 2016 to bring the season total to 17.

Teasing the premise of season two in April 2016, Klemmer stated, "We're coming at it from a completely different angle. We're determined to make every part of season two feel like its own show. [The first episode of season two] will very much be a new pilot with new good guys, new bad guys, new stakes, new dynamics, new goals. The team will basically have to find a new purpose. Once you save the world, what do you do then?... The fact that the world was in peril sort of forced our team to fall into its own dysfunctional version of lockstep. Season two, they're no longer going to be hunted by Time Masters. They're no longer going to be burdened with having to save the world. It's no longer going to be about saving Miranda and Jonas. The interesting thing about season two is I think it's going to have a much, much different tone because our Legends are going to have a totally different purpose. They're actually going to have a totally different constitution. There will be new faces and new everything." The season also introduced members of the Justice Society of America. The Society consisted of Hourman, Vixen, Commander Steel, Obsidian, Stargirl, and Dr. Mid-Nite. The season also featured a version of the Legion of Doom, composed of the Reverse-Flash, Malcolm Merlyn, Damien Darhk, and Leonard Snart.

Legends of Tomorrow was renewed for a fourth season which premiered on October 22, 2018. On January 31, 2019, The CW renewed the series for a fifth season. The fifth season debuted following the midseason break in January 2020. On January 7, 2020, the series was renewed for a sixth season, which premiered on May 2, 2021. On February 3, 2021, the series was renewed for a seventh season which premiered on October 13, 2021, and the series finale aired on March 2, 2022.

=== Filming ===
In May 2015, Garber revealed filming would begin in August 2015, for a January 2016 premiere. The series shot a presentation for the network's upfront showcase, which was filmed over the course of one night, and directed by Arrow and The Flash veteran Dermott Downs. Filming of the series began on September 9, 2015, in Vancouver, British Columbia. Director/producer Glen Winter discussed in a January 2016 interview with Comic Book Resources the process of filming key elements of the series' pilot,

The new facet for Legends was that there's no #1 [actor] on the call sheet. There are seven or eight leads. For me, that was the intimidating part. I wasn't as worried about the action and tone as I was with wrangling all these personalities and finding out how they all work together. Or, how to shoot a scene with eight people in the Waverider, day after day.

He stated of the series style of shooting on location as opposed to predominantly shooting on a soundstage,

As is typical with any pilot, most of the time you are going to shoot more on location. Because you don't necessarily know if you are going to have a show that's been picked up, they don't want to invest a lot of money in the infrastructure, so you end up shooting more on location. The only set that was built was the Waverider. That being said, because we knew there was a pickup for the show, it wasn't a conventional pilot. All the resources of construction went into the Waverider. That's continuing into the series. I don't think they tend to build much. I think they tend to adapt locations because there's so much time travel and so many eras to create.

=== Music ===
Arrow, The Flash, and Supergirl composer Blake Neely was also hired for this series. All soundtracks and singles are released by WaterTower Music. The first season soundtrack was released on August 31, 2016, and the second on October 10, 2017. In season 3, tracks from its episode of the "Crisis on Earth-X" event were included in the score soundtrack. DC's Legends of Tomorrow: The Mixtape was released on August 20, 2021, featuring covers and original songs from the series to that point. The soundtracks of the fourth and fifth seasons were released on September 5, 2021, the day of the sixth-season finale. Season six's soundtrack would be released on October 8, 2021. Season seven saw the release of three singles: "Future Favorite" from the episode "Speakeasy Does It" performed by Amy Pemberton and written by secondary composer James Chan, released on November 3, 2021, a polka-inspired cover of Dead or Alive's "You Spin Me Round (Like a Record)" performed by Jonathan Walton in the episode "The Fixed Point", and "By Your Side", performed by Shayan Sobhian as Behrad Tarazi in "Too Legit to Quit", both released on March 11, 2022.

== Broadcast ==
Legends of Tomorrow premiered in the United States on January 21, 2016, and the first season consisted of sixteen episodes. The series premiere in Australia was originally announced as January 20, 2016, however it was pushed back until January 22. It started airing in the United Kingdom on March 3, 2016. This show also aired on CTV Sci-Fi Channel in Canada.

== Reception ==
=== Critical response ===
Critical response of Legends of Tomorrow
| Season | Rotten Tomatoes | Metacritic |
|---|---|---|
| 1 | 65% (267 reviews) | 58 (22 reviews) |
| 2 | 88% (166 reviews) | —N/a |
| 3 | 88% (36 reviews) | —N/a |
| 4 | 98% (107 reviews) | —N/a |
| 5 | 100% (13 reviews) | —N/a |
| 6 | 100% (7 reviews) | —N/a |

The pilot was well reviewed for its potential. Russ Burlingame from ComicBook.com praised it saying, "The series delivers a sharp, enjoyable pilot that's arguably the most attention-grabbing and entertaining from any of the current crop of superhero shows." Jesse Schedeen of IGN gave the first part of the pilot episode a 7.7/10, praising the show's "epic scope", "fun character dynamics", and Arthur Darvill's performance; and gave the second part of the pilot an 8.4/10, saying it "improved in its sophomore episode thanks to great character dynamics and superhero action".

However, review aggregation website Rotten Tomatoes gave the complete first season only a 65% approval rating, with an average rating of 6.42/10 based on 36 reviews. The website's consensus reads: "Fancy effects, comic-book nostalgia, and an alluring cast help keep it afloat, but DC's Legends of Tomorrow suffers from an overloaded cast of characters that contribute to a distractingly crowded canvas." Metacritic, which uses a weighted average, assigned a score of 58 out of 100 based on reviews from 22 critics, indicating "mixed or average reviews".

Rotten Tomatoes gave the second season an 88% approval rating, with an average rating of 6.97/10 based on 10 reviews. The website's consensus reads: "Though the narrative remains too ambitious, DC's Legends of Tomorrow enjoys a freer creative arc with the removal of problem characters."

The third season holds an approval rating of 88% on Rotten Tomatoes, with an average rating of 7.95/10 based on 8 reviews. The Website's consensus reads: "DC's Legends of Tomorrow lightens up the tone in its third season while spotlighting adventurous plots and a distinct sense of humor." while IGN gave the season an approval rating of 8.1/10, stating: "When Legends of Tomorrow works, it's easily among the best superhero shows on television (if not shows in general). Unfortunately, while Season 3 reached some impressive highs, it also gave us some of the weakest installments of the series. Season 3 ultimately suffered from its inability to create a conflict worthy of this cast of misfit heroes, and that casts a shadow that will linger when the series returns for Season 4."

In April 2021, The A.V. Club praised the show's transformation to an "amazing metafictional comedy", calling it "one of the most impressive turnarounds in genre TV history."

=== Ratings ===
Viewership and ratings per season of Legends of Tomorrow
| Season | Timeslot (ET) | Episodes | First aired | | Last aired | | TV season | Viewership rank | Avg. viewers (millions) | 18–49 rank | Avg. 18–49 rating |
| Season | Timeslot (ET) | Episodes | Date | Viewers (millions) | Date | Viewers (millions) | TV season | Viewership rank | Avg. viewers (millions) | 18–49 rank | Avg. 18–49 rating |
|---|---|---|---|---|---|---|---|---|---|---|---|
| 1 | Thursday 8:00 pm | 16 | January 21, 2016 | 3.21 | May 19, 2016 | 1.85 | 2015–16 | 135 | 3.16 | 104 | 1.2 |
| 2 | Thursday 8:00 pm (1–8); Tuesday 9:00 pm (9–17) | 17 | October 13, 2016 | 1.82 | April 4, 2017 | 1.52 | 2016–17 | 141 | 2.57 | 127 | 0.9 |
| 3 | Tuesday 9:00 pm (1–9); Monday 8:00 pm (10–18) | 18 | October 10, 2017 | 1.71 | April 9, 2018 | 1.41 | 2017–18 | 170 | 2.24 | 126 | 0.8 |
| 4 | Monday 9:00 pm (1–8); Monday 8:00 pm (9–16) | 16 | October 22, 2018 | 1.00 | May 20, 2019 | 1.05 | 2018–19 | 178 | 1.49 | 147 | 0.5 |
| 5 | Tuesday 9:00 pm | 15 | January 21, 2020 | 0.72 | June 2, 2020 | 0.73 | 2019–20 | 122 | 1.35 | 122 | 0.4 |
| 6 | Sunday 8:00 pm | 15 | May 2, 2021 | 0.44 | September 5, 2021 | 0.39 | 2020–21 | 149 | 0.82 | 141 | 0.2 |
| 7 | Wednesday 8:00 pm | 13 | October 13, 2021 | 0.59 | March 2, 2022 | 0.46 | 2021–22 | 127 | 0.86 | 117 | 0.2 |

Legends of Tomorrow : U.S. viewers per episode (millions)

| Season | Episode number | | | | | | | | | | | | | | | | | |
| Season | 1 | 2 | 3 | 4 | 5 | 6 | 7 | 8 | 9 | 10 | 11 | 12 | 13 | 14 | 15 | 16 | 17 | 18 |
|---|---|---|---|---|---|---|---|---|---|---|---|---|---|---|---|---|---|---|
| 1 | 3.21 | 2.89 | 2.32 | 2.39 | 2.25 | 2.47 | 2.28 | 2.01 | 1.97 | 1.88 | 1.98 | 1.78 | 1.86 | 1.63 | 1.89 | 1.85 | – | |
| 2 | 1.82 | 1.80 | 1.75 | 1.75 | 1.77 | 1.85 | 3.39 | 2.00 | 1.74 | 1.78 | 1.77 | 1.64 | 1.54 | 1.34 | 1.72 | 1.59 | 1.52 | – |
| 3 | 1.71 | 1.58 | 1.43 | 1.38 | 1.52 | 1.53 | 1.49 | 2.80 | 1.61 | 1.51 | 1.40 | 1.51 | 1.19 | 1.26 | 1.25 | 1.28 | 1.23 | 1.41 |
| 4 | 1.00 | 0.94 | 0.86 | 0.90 | 0.91 | 0.97 | 0.93 | 1.10 | 0.92 | 0.95 | 0.98 | 0.85 | 0.91 | 0.94 | 0.99 | 1.05 | – | |
| 5 | 1.35 | 0.72 | 0.77 | 0.74 | 0.72 | 0.74 | 0.73 | 0.67 | 0.65 | 0.69 | 0.72 | 0.66 | 0.80 | 0.76 | 0.73 | – | | |
| 6 | 0.44 | 0.47 | 0.38 | 0.42 | 0.42 | 0.41 | 0.45 | 0.44 | 0.40 | 0.39 | 0.45 | 0.35 | 0.41 | 0.43 | 0.39 | – | | |
| 7 | 0.59 | 0.52 | 0.51 | 0.56 | 0.48 | 0.50 | 0.50 | 0.56 | 0.55 | 0.57 | 0.64 | 0.43 | 0.46 | – | | | | |

Audience measurement performed by Nielsen Media Research

=== Awards and nominations ===
Awards and nominations received by Legends of Tomorrow
| Year | Award | Category | Recipient(s) | Result | Ref. |
|---|---|---|---|---|---|
| 2016 | Saturn Awards | Best Superhero Adaption Television Series | Legends of Tomorrow | Nominated | |
| 2016 | The Joey Awards | Young Actor in a TV Series Featured Role 6–10 Years | Glen Gordon | Won | |
| 2016 | The Joey Awards | Young Actor in an Action TV Series Guest Starring/Principal Role | Aiden Longworth | Nominated | |
| 2016 | The Joey Awards | Young Actor in an Action TV Series Guest Starring/Principal Role | Cory Gruter-Andrew | Nominated | |
| 2016 | The Joey Awards | Young Actor in an Action TV Series Guest Starring/Principal Role | Mitchell Kummen | Won | |
| 2016 | The Joey Awards | Young Actor in a TV Series Recurring Role 6–9 Years | Kiefer O'Reilly | Won | |
| 2017 | Leo Awards | Best Direction in a Dramatic Series | David Geddes | Nominated | |
| 2017 | Leo Awards | Best Visual Effects in a Dramatic Series | Armen V. Kevorkian, Meagan Condito, Rick Ramirez, Andranik Taranyan, James Rorick | Nominated | |
| 2017 | Leo Awards | Best Sound in a Dramatic Series | Kristian Bailey | Won | |
| 2017 | Teen Choice Awards | Choice TV Actress: Action | Caity Lotz | Nominated | |
| 2018 | Saturn Awards | Best Superhero Adaptation Television Series | Legends of Tomorrow | Nominated | |
| 2018 | Teen Choice Awards | Choice TV Actress: Action | Caity Lotz | Nominated | |
| 2019 | Teen Choice Awards | Choice TV Show: Action | Legends of Tomorrow | Nominated | |
| 2019 | Teen Choice Awards | Choice TV Actor: Action | Brandon Routh | Nominated | |
| 2019 | Saturn Awards | Best Superhero Television Series | Legends of Tomorrow | Nominated | |
| 2021 | Critics' Choice Super Awards | Best Superhero Series | Legends of Tomorrow | Nominated | |

== Home media ==
Home media releases for Legends of Tomorrow
| Complete season | DVD/Blu-ray release dates | | | Additional features |
| Complete season | Region 1/A | Region 2/B | Region 4/C | Additional features |
|---|---|---|---|---|
| 1 | August 23, 2016 | August 29, 2016 | August 31, 2016 | DC's Legends of Tomorrow: 2015 Comic-Con Panel; The Wave Rider; Legends of Tomorrow: History in the Making; Hex Marks the Spot; Deleted scenes; Gag reel |
| 2 | August 15, 2017 | August 14, 2017 | August 16, 2017 | DC's Legends of Tomorrow: 2016 Comic-Con Panel; Allied: The Invasion Complex (DC's Legends of Tomorrow); Deleted scenes; Gag reel |
| 3 | September 25, 2018 | September 24, 2018 | September 26, 2018 | All four episodes of the Crisis on Earth-X crossover; The Best of DC TV's Comic-Con Panels San Diego 2017; Inside the Crossover: Crisis on Earth-X; Gag Reel |
| 4 | September 24, 2019 | November 9, 2019 | September 25, 2019 | DC's Legends of Tomorrow Season 4 Post Production Theater; DC's Legends of Tomorrow: Legendary Storytelling; Deleted scenes; Gag reel |
| 5 | September 22, 2020 | September 21, 2020 | September 23, 2020 | DC's Legends of Tomorrow Season 5 Post Production Theater; Deleted scenes; Gag reel |
| 6 | November 9, 2021 | November 9, 2021 | November 9, 2021 | Never Alone: Heroes and Allies; VFX Creature Feature; Animation split screen; Actors split screen; Deleted scenes; Gag reel |

== Arrowverse ==
In May 2015, Renée made a cameo in the final episode of The Flash's first season, "Fast Enough", and later made appearances in the show's second season in November 2015. In July 2015, Guggenheim revealed that the resurrection of Sara Lance would be launched in the first few episodes of Arrow's fourth season, with the events of the eighth episodes of Arrow and The Flash—which were a crossover event—being used to set up the other characters of Legends of Tomorrow. Franz Drameh was introduced as the new other half of Firestorm in the fourth episode of the second season of The Flash. Crump, Hentschel and James debut in the crossover episodes for the second season of The Flash and the fourth season of Arrow. In November 2016, the cast of Legends of Tomorrow appeared on The Flash and Arrow as part of the "Invasion!" crossover event, which also featured appearances by Melissa Benoist, reprising her role as Kara Danvers / Supergirl from Supergirl. Further crossovers occurred with "Crisis on Earth-X" in 2017, and "Crisis on Infinite Earths" in-between 2019 and 2020.

== Christmas special ==
The series' breakout toy character Beebo, voiced by Benjamin Diskin, starred in his own Christmas special, titled Beebo Saves Christmas, which aired on December 21, 2021. Narrated by Victor Garber, the special sees Diskin reprising his role, alongside Ernie Hudson as Santa Claus, Chris Kattan as a Christmas elf named Sprinkles, Kimiko Glenn as Tweebo, Yvette Nicole Brown as Turbo, and Keith Ferguson as Fleabo.

== Cancellation ==
Ahead of the season seven finale, Shimizu said it was not intended to be the series finale even though an eighth season had not yet been ordered. Despite this, The CW canceled the series on April 29, 2022. Shortly thereafter, fans began campaigning to save the series by renewing it for an eighth and final season to wrap up the series' loose ends. Shimizu held herself responsible for the series ending without proper resolution, explaining that her contract ended with the season but she did not want to reveal anything until the series was renewed for an eighth season; she conceded that she "played chicken with the pickup, and lost", but was hopeful the loose ends could be resolved through other means such as a comic book tie-in, television film, or radio play. The introduction of Booster Gold, played by Donald Faison in the season seven finale, was meant to deter The CW from canceling the series, and Faison would have been a main cast member had an eighth season been ordered. The tie-in comic Earth-Prime: Legends of Tomorrow #3 has a storyline set after the series finale, which Screen Rant writer Matt Morrison believed should give fans of the series some form of closure.

Lesley Goldberg of The Hollywood Reporter noted that although CW chairman Mark Pedowitz wanted the series to continue, Warner Bros. Television did not want to continue paying the leases on the studio space, which were set to expire on May 1, leading to the series' cancellation. Having the series continue on HBO Max or Paramount+ was considered impossible by Goldberg due to the series being part of a deal Warner Bros. signed with Netflix in 2011. With The Flash being the last remaining Arrowverse series at the time, its showrunner Eric Wallace expressed interest in the series' ninth season trying to resolve the loose ends left behind by Legends of Tomorrow, but was uncertain of the viability because the number of episodes for the season had not yet been decided, and he believed incorporating the Legends was difficult to achieve when he had to conclude his own story. Upon his hiring as the co-chairman and co-CEO of DC Studios in November 2022, James Gunn acknowledged campaigns calling to save the series, but also stated that his focus at the time would not be on revivals. The ninth season of The Flash ultimately did not feature the Legends or close any loose ends as originally intended due to being constrained by the 13-episode limit. Guggenheim stated in May 2026 that the CW, under Pedowitz, wanted to conclude the storyline of Legends of Tomorrow with a film, but the proposal was rejected by Warner Bros.
