= Wvrdr error 100 oest-of-th3-gs.gid30n not found =

"wvrdr_error_100<oest-of-th3-gs.gid30n> not found"
- Legends of Tomorrow episode
- The Legend line up in a hallway staring at Gideon.
- Episode no.: Season 7 Episode 3
- Directed by: Caity Lotz
- Written by: Phil Klemmer; Matthew Maala
- Production code: T13.23203
- Original air date: October 27, 2021

Guest appearances
- Brandon Routh as Ray Palmer / Atom; Victor Garber as Martin Stein; Franz Drameh as Jefferson "Jax" Jackson; Arthur Darvill as Rip Hunter; Courtney Ford as Nora Darhk; Wentworth Miller as Leonard Snart / Captain Cold; Raffi Barsoumian as Bishop; Falk Hentschel as Carter Hall / Hawkman

Episode chronology
← Previous "The Need for Speed"	Next → "Speakeasy Does It"
- Legends of Tomorrow season 7

"wvrdr_error_100<oest-of-th3-gs.gid30n> not found" is the third episode of the seventh season of the American science fiction television series Legends of Tomorrow, revolving around the eponymous team of superheroes and their time traveling adventures. It is set in the Arrowverse, sharing continuity with the other television series of the universe. This was the 100th episode of the series, written by Phil Klemmer and Matthew Maala, and directed by Caity Lotz. The episode premiered on October 27, 2021, on The CW.

The episode stars Olivia Swann, Lisseth Chavez, and Amy Pemberton. They are joined by other principal cast members Caity Lotz, Tala Ashe, Jes Macallan, Adam Tsekhman, Shayan Sobhian, and Nick Zano. Several former series regulars return including Brandon Routh, Victor Garber, Franz Drameh, Arthur Darvill, Courtney Ford, Wentworth Miller, and Falk Hentschel.

== Plot ==
Astra Louge, Gideon and Spooner Cruz make their way to the highway when they find a barn with pie. Spooner and Astra argue whether Gideon should steal a pie. This leads to Gideon struggling with making decisions and collapsing. Unable to reboot her, Astra uses her powers to send herself and Spooner into Gideon's mind. Inside, they meet a British-accented memory of the former Legends member Jefferson Jackson, who is monitoring Gideon's damaged subconsciousness.

Bishop then is woken up from being knocked out by an AVA clone. Bishop then is able to access a copy of Gideon he made while he was with the Legends.

Back in Gideon's mind, Jax informs Astra that Gideon is losing her memories, so Astra and Spooner go through and help her regain memories by re-experiencing them. They first visit the day which the Legends kidnap Spooner. They are then sent back to the early days of the Legends where Gideon prevents a fight between Sara Lance, Ray Palmer, Carter Hall, and Leonard Snart. They experience a memory re-encountering Martin Stein. They discover the existence of a virus of herself who does not want to be human.

They then enter a memory where Rip Hunter reveals that the Waverider only has one bathroom. As the argument continues Gideon follows the virus pretending to be Rip Hunter. The virus then corrupts her memories, who then forces her to re-experience the deaths of several Legends, and reveals that Rip had reprogrammed her to protect the Legends and learn from them.

The virus uses several Legends members to attack Gideon, Astra, and Spooner. After defeating and un-corrupting the memories. Spooner and Astra show Gideon happier memories, convincing her to embrace her humanity and take control of the virus. She is comforted by several of the Legends, accepts her role as a member of the team and wakes up.

Back in Vancouver, the past Bishop has dreams of his future self and the Legends from the alien invasion in 1925. He finds a copy of Gideon that he downloaded and resets her memories, intending to use her against the Legends.

== Production ==
=== Development ===
In July 2021, Legends of Tomorrow cast member Caity Lotz announced that she had begun preparation to direct the series' 100th episode. While the episode's title was initially announced as "WVRDR_ERROR_100 <Oest-of-th3-Gs.gid30n> notFound", it was later amended to "wvrdr_error_100<oest-of-th3-gs.gid30n> not found".

=== Writing ===
The episode was written by showrunner Phil Klemmer and Matthew Maala. The initial version of the script was created on July 28, 2021. The final version was finished August 4, 2021.

Klemmer explained the episode's structure: "The whole episode really is predicated on memory and Gideon's memory [...] It occurred to us, in being forced to do a retrospective of 100 episodes, that Gideon, really, is the only person who saw everything".

=== Casting ===
Main cast members Caity Lotz as Sara Lance / White Canary, Tala Ashe as Zari Tarazi, Jes Macallan as Ava Sharpe, Olivia Swann as Astra Logue, Adam Tsekhman as Gary Green, Shayan Sobhian as Behrad Tarazi, Lisseth Chavez as Esperanza "Spooner" Cruz, Amy Louise Pemberton as Gideon, and Nick Zano as Nate Heywood all return to star in the episodes from previous seasons.

Many former main cast members return as guest stars; including Brandon Routh as Ray Palmer / Atom, Victor Garber as Martin Stein, Franz Drameh as Jefferson Jackson, Arthur Darvill as Rip Hunter, Courtney Ford as Nora Darhk, Wentworth Miller as Leonard Snart / Captain Cold, and Falk Hentschel as Carter Hall / Hawkman. Additionally, Raffi Barsoumian guest stars as Bishop.

Routh returned for the episode, explaining that his decision to exit the series as a regular was a bad decision, while adding that the show needed a more mature version of the character. Klemmer said he was interested in Ciara Renée, Dominic Purcell and Casper Crump reprising their roles as Kendra Saunders / Hawkgirl, Mick Rory / Heatwave and Vandal Savage, but ultimately did not cast them.

=== Filming ===
Filming began on August 5, and ended later in the month.

== Release ==
"wvrdr_error_100<oest-of-th3-gs.gid30n> not found" premiered on October 27, 2021, on The CW. It was watched by 0.51 million viewers with a 0.1 share among adults aged 18 to 49.

== Critical reception ==
Jarrod Jones of The A.V. Club said the episode "does not explore the full spectrum of Legends' trajectory – moments from the middle seasons are left relatively dry – but it's still a touching tribute to how Gideon and the crew have affected one another", and gave it a B+ rating. Writing for Game Rant, Bruno Savill De Jong rated the episode four stars out of five, saying it is a "surprisingly focused episode, considering the extent of cameos and memories it must cover. Although it doesn't quite have room for the whole ensemble to shine, it does delve into the messy heart that has become core to Legends".
