= Funeral for a Friend (disambiguation) =

Funeral for a Friend are a Welsh post-hardcore band.

Funeral for a Friend may also refer to:

- "Funeral for a Friend/Love Lies Bleeding", two songs by Elton John
- Funeral for a Friend (comics), a story arc in The Death of Superman
- "Funeral for a Friend" (The Flash), an episode of The Flash
