= The Man in the Yellow Tie =

- The Flash episode
- Episode no.: Season 8 Episode 18
- Directed by: Marcus Stokes
- Written by: Sam Chalsen
- Production code: T27.14818
- Original air date: June 15, 2022

Guest appearances
- Brandon Routh as Ray Palmer; Tom Cavanagh as Eobard Thawne; Matt Letscher as Eobard Thawne; David Ramsey as John Diggle; Christian Magby as Negative Deon Owens; Jon Cor as Mark Blaine; Kausar Mohammed as Meena Dhawan

Episode chronology
← Previous "Keep It Dark"	Next → "Negative, Part One"
- The Flash season 8

"The Man in the Yellow Tie" is the 18th episode of the eighth season of the American superhero television series The Flash. The episode was directed by Marcus Stokes and written by Sam Chalsen. It is set in the Arrowverse, sharing continuity with the other television series of the universe, and is a spin-off of Arrow. The episode follows Meena Dhawan (Kausar Mohammed) as Barry Allen (Grant Gustin) attempts to train her into becoming a proper hero. It also features the conclusion of the character arc John Diggle (David Ramsey) began in the series finale of Arrow.

"The Man in the Yellow Tie" met praise for its acting, though the resolution for John Diggle's story arc was panned by critics. It originally aired on The CW on June 15, 2022, to an audience of 500,000 viewers. The episode features guest appearances from former Arrowverse series regulars including Brandon Routh and Matt Letscher of Legends of Tomorrow and Tom Cavanagh of The Flash. The episode was the first full appearance of Kausar Mohammed as Meena Dhawan.

== Plot ==
After Barry Allen catches Meena Dhawan, she shows him the Biometric Lightning Oscillation Chamber (BLOC), which grants her speed and introduces him to its co-inventor: the time remnant of Eobard Thawne from Flashpoint, though he does not remember his past or Barry. Barry tries to stop Meena from using the BLOC, but it connects her to the Negative Speed Force and she begins draining power junctions. The alternate Thawne states that he fell in love with Meena and had visions of the BLOC, but was unaware of the Negative Speed Force. He reminds Meena of their love and she disconnects from it.

Later, Ray Palmer informs Team Flash that the Flashpoint Thawne was revived and reeducated by the Time Wraiths before being killed. (Note: As depicted in the Legends of Tomorrow episode "The Fixed Point".) Barry theorizes that he was revived again and brought to Meena. Meanwhile, Cecile Horton's powers grow when she stops a bank robbery and mugging, but is stalked by a mysterious woman. Mark Blaine contacts Caitlin Snow and reveals he has a come up with a plan to resurrect her clone Frost.

John Diggle approaches the original Thawne, who has been imprisoned on Lian Yu, looking for help in opening his box. (Note: First seen in the Arrow episode "Fadeout".) Thawne recognizes the box and reveals that he does know how to open it but states that if he does Diggle would be forced to leave his family. Diggle decides to remain with his family and the box disappears. Deon Owens visits the imprisoned Thawne and tells him that it is time to "fulfill his destiny."

== Production ==
"The Man in the Yellow Tie" was written by Sam Chalsen and directed by Marcus Stokes. The episode concludes the story line revolving the mysterious box that John Diggle received in "Fadeout", the final episode of Arrow. According to Arrowverse co-creator Marc Guggenheim, while the original plan was for Diggle to end up becoming a member of the Green Lantern Corps, this was ultimately changed. He explained that the reason for the change was because they were unable to get permission from DC Comics to use the Green Lantern IP.

The episodes title references the title of the season 1 episode "The Man in the Yellow Suit".

=== Casting ===
"The Man in the Yellow Tie" features series regulars Grant Gustin, Danielle Nicolet, Jesse L. Martin, Danielle Panabaker, Kayla Compton, and Brandon McKnight. Candice Patton does not appear in the episode; she attributed her absence to COVID-19 travel restrictions between the United States, where she resides, and Canada, where the series films.

Kausar Mohammed makes her first full appearance as Meena Dhawan. While discussing her character, Mohammed stated that she was proud to play the character, as she felt that South Asian woman are largely unrepresented in media.

The episode features a guest appearance by Brandon Routh reprising his role as Ray Palmer. Routh had previously returned to the role earlier in the season, in "Armageddon, Part One", after his character was written out of Legends of Tomorrow season five. Matt Letscher and Tom Cavanagh both appear as different versions of Eobard Thawne. Letscher's version of the character last appeared in the Legends of Tomorrow season 7 episode "Rage Against The Machines" where he sacrificed himself to save the Legends after previously fighting against them as the primary antagonist of Legends of Tomorrow season two. The Cavanagh version last appeared as the villain of the five part season premiere, "Armageddon", where he was nearly erased from existence. David Ramsey guest stars as John Diggle. Ramsey had previously guest starred in various Arrowverse shows as part of Diggle's arc.

== Release ==
"The Man in the Yellow Tie" first released on The CW on June 15, 2022, to an audience of 500,000 live viewers. The episode finished last in its time slot and sixteenth (second to last) of the night overall. The episode was down around 80,000 viewers from the previous one.

=== Reception ===
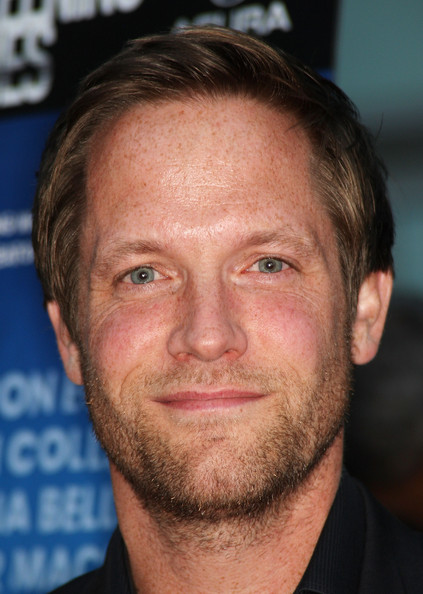
The return of Matt Letscher and his performance in the episode was praised by critics.

The resolution to Diggle's storyline was met with a negative response. CinemaBlend's Mick Joest described the ending as a disappointment that failed to reach expectations writing, "what I can't understand is why it took over two years to pay off a storyline that simply featured John rejecting the box". Writing for Screen Rant, Charles Raymond felt that while the decision to have Diggle stay with his family was in character, it wasted the two years of set up the plotline had been given.

Letscher's performance in the episode was praise by critics. Writing for Comic Book Resources Anita Stewart felt that the episode did a good job at revitalizing the character of Eobard Thawne and enjoyed how it portrayed the dynamic between him and Barry. Den of Geek's Lacy Baugher praised the parallels between Thawne and Dhawan's relationship and Iris and Barry's. GameRant's Oliver VanDervoot criticized the return of Letscher's Thawne, feeling that it was an example of the series running out of ideas. He also felt that the episode had too much going on while simultaneously neglecting Patton and Panabaker's characters.
