= The Flash season 8 =

The Flash
- Season 8
- Promotional poster
- Showrunner: Eric Wallace
- Starring: Grant Gustin; Candice Patton; Danielle Panabaker; Danielle Nicolet; Kayla Compton; Brandon McKnight; Jesse L. Martin
- No. of episodes: 20

Release
- Original network: The CW
- Original release: November 16, 2021 – June 29, 2022

Season chronology
- ← Previous; Season 7 Next → Season 9

The eighth season of the American superhero television series The Flash, which is based on the DC Comics character Barry Allen / Flash, premiered on The CW on November 16, 2021. The season follows Barry facing against his nemesis, the Reverse-Flash, the futuristic alien Despero, the entity Deathstorm and the Negative Forces. It is set in the Arrowverse, sharing continuity with the other television series of the universe, and is a spin-off of Arrow. The season is produced by Berlanti Productions, Warner Bros. Television, and DC Entertainment, with Eric Wallace serving as showrunner.

The season was ordered on February 3, 2021. Filming began that August and concluded the following April. Grant Gustin stars as Barry, with principal cast members Candice Patton, Danielle Panabaker, Danielle Nicolet, Kayla Compton, Brandon McKnight, and Jesse L. Martin also returning from previous seasons. This is the last season to feature Martin as a series regular. The series was renewed for a ninth and final season, which premiered on February 8, 2023.

== Episodes ==
Season eight is broken into three "Graphic Novel" storyline arcs, known as the fifth, sixth and seventh graphic novels respectively; this numbering continues from on seven. The first "Graphic Novel" of the season, "Armageddon", is a five-episode event featuring multiple actors reprising their Arrowverse roles.

The Flash season 8 episodes
No. overall	No. in season	Title	Directed by	Written by	Original release date	Prod. code	U.S. viewers (millions)
Graphic Novel #5: Armageddon
152	1	"Armageddon, Part 1"	Eric Dean Seaton	Eric Wallace	November 16, 2021	T27.14801	0.75
In 2031 Central City, psychic alien Despero witnesses the end of the world. Six months after the Godspeed war, Barry Allen's skills have gradually improved. After stopping a train collision in record time, he apprehends the Royal Flush Gang during a cryptocurrency heist. Iris West-Allen heads the larger and stronger Central City Citizen Media and interviews Kristen Kramer, who has disbanded the meta task force. She promotes Allegra Garcia, who struggles to control her new staff, but is able to shift their focuses to the voice of the people. Meanwhile, Ray Palmer arrives in Central City for a tech convention and Chester P. Runk surprises him with a group of tech start-ups, but Ray turns them down. Suddenly, Despero arrives and attacks the tech convention. He attempts to kill Barry, stating that he is responsible for the end of the world. Ray suits up as The Atom and sends him away. Cecile Horton confirms that Despero was telling the truth. Later, Ray decides to create an organization in Chester's father's name that will help new start-ups and leaves. Barry gives his identity to Despero, who gives him one week to prove his innocence.
153	2	"Armageddon, Part 2"	Menhaj Huda	Jonathan Butler & Gabriel Garza	November 23, 2021	T27.14802	0.67
Despero informs Barry that he will lose himself to madness. The following day, Barry investigates an insane security guard, but Kramer forces him to turn in his badge over a federal investigation suggesting that he was a mole for Joseph Carver. Later, S.T.A.R. Labs is raided and shut down after a radiation spike, so Barry has Gideon erase everything. Alex Danvers assists Team Flash in researching Despero and learns about his home planet of Kalanor, that was destroyed by an evil despot, and his power source, the Flame of Py'tar. Frost asks Chester to build a weapon to harm Despero, despite his pacifism. With a hint from the guard, Barry goes after psychic meta-criminal Xotar. She causes him to go insane and attack his team, but he later depowers her during a jewelry heist. Barry suggests they celebrate with Joe West, but is informed that he died six months prior. News footage shows Barry attacking residents of Central City after Xotar had been depowered, but he does not remember this or Joe's death. Despero arrives to kill Barry, but the team allows him to escape to the Hall of Justice, where he meets with Jefferson Pierce.
154	3	"Armageddon, Part 3"	Chris Peppe	Sam Chalsen	November 30, 2021	T27.14803	0.73
In compliance with the Injustice Protocols, Barry asks Jefferson to remove his powers. He begins to, but stops when Barry mentions Despero. Barry lashes out at Jefferson, but is eventually convinced to stand down. Meanwhile, Iris suspects that Barry was framed and that Joe's death was set up. She investigates with Allegra, discovering a unique set of coincidences that suggest foul play. She begins to see temporal particles and meets with Deon Owens, who discovers that someone tapped into the Negative Still Force to change the timeline and kill Joe. Concurrently, Cecile coerces Rosalind Dillon into helping her find Barry. Dillon tells Cecile to suppress her grief, but Caitlin Snow convinces her to embrace her love instead. Despero turns on the particle accelerator, absorbs its power, and attacks Cecile's group. He learns Barry's location and travels there, but is held off by Jefferson, Iris, and Deon. Deon informs Barry of his findings and sends him to 2031, where he witnesses a future Iris celebrating her engagement to Eobard Thawne alongside Team Flash, Alex, Ryan Choi, and Ryan Wilder, who are unhappy to see him.
155	4	"Armageddon, Part 4"	Chad Lowe	Lauren Barnett	December 7, 2021	T27.14804	0.73
Barry finds that he is the Reverse-Flash in this new timeline. Thawne reveals that he killed Joe and framed Barry for the attacks in Central City, then traveled back in time to kill Barry as a child and became The Flash. At midnight, the Reverse-Flashpoint timeline will solidify and Barry will disappear. Barry partners with this timeline's Damien Darhk and plots revenge against Thawne, but Darhk learns Barry's true nature and helps Barry restore the original timeline upon learning that his daughter Nora Darhk is alive in it. Meanwhile, Wilder visits Iris while she struggles to write her vows to Thawne. Alex helps Chester and Allegra admit their love for one another and convinces Choi to love again. The speed required for Barry to return to 2021 will cause Armageddon through extinction-level natural disasters, so Barry visits Iris to say goodbye. He is intercepted by Thawne, but Iris lets him escape. Thawne chases him while Darhk holds off Frost, Chillblaine, Choi (as The Atom), and Sentinel. As Barry returns to 2021, Thawne's changes are undone and Barry tells Despero to check 2031 for himself. Thawne arrives in 2021 in the Time Vault as the Reverse-Flash.
156	5	"Armageddon, Part 5"	Menhaj Huda	Kristen Kim	December 14, 2021	T27.14805	0.72
Barry reunites with Joe, but the two are interrupted by Darhk, whose erasure is being delayed due to his Time Stone. Thawne attacks CCPD, but is stopped by Barry and Mia Queen, who is searching for her brother William Clayton. Thawne asks Barry to save him from his own erasure. Despero returns and urges Barry to let Thawne die, but Joe convinces Barry and Iris to let him live. Despero takes control of Mia and has her hold off Team Flash while he threatens to destroy Central City to take out Thawne. Iris and Cecile help Mia regain control while Barry deduces that Despero was the despot on Kalanor. With technology from Chester, Barry depowers Despero and sends him away. Barry then drains Thawne's speed to prevent his erasure and has him remanded to A.R.G.U.S. custody. During a celebration, Iris helps Mia with a lead on William and convinces her to visit Felicity Smoak. Darhk gives his Time Stone to Joe and bids farewell to his daughter Nora, who appears in his place. In CCPD, the timeline changes to show Bart Allen and Nora West-Allen in a photograph with Eddie Thawne from 2014.
Interlude II
157	6	"Impulsive Excessive Disorder"	David McWhirter	Thomas Pound	March 9, 2022	T27.14806	0.59
After their parents' vow renewals, (Note: As depicted in the episode "Heart of the Matter, Part 2") Bart and Nora return to 2049 to find Jay Garrick alive and Joan Williams erased. Their and Godspeed's overuse of the Cosmic Treadmill caused temporal shifts, so they travel back to the earliest one on December 31, 2013, when Joe was shot during a jewelry heist. While posing as intern CSIs on a coffee run for Eddie, they meet a girl named Avery who is studying quantum mechanics. Bart rescues Joe from being shot, but this only changes the timeline more, as metahuman Mona Taylor (who will become Queen of the Royal Flush Gang) eavesdrops on their conversation and plans a deadly heist. With help from Avery, Bart and Nora learn that they cannot stop the heist, but they can stop the casualties. Bart evacuates the building, but is injured by Queen, though Nora is able to remove all of the bombs in time. Bart shares a kiss with Avery and returns to 2049 with Nora, where Jay and Joan are both alive. In the present after Team Flash leaves for brunch, Iris' hairbrush disappears in a green light.
158	7	"Lockdown"	Stefan Pleszczynski	Christina M. Walker	March 16, 2022	T27.14807	0.56
Kramer is frustrated by how the Flash drops off criminals without context. Joe suggests that Kramer have a line to the Flash, but Barry is hesitant. That night, Goldface leads a gas attack on CCPD in search of bullets that can remove metahuman abilities, knocking out Barry and Kramer. They awaken with explosive meta-dampening cuffs, though Kramer's mimic abilities are able to short-circuit them. Despite her inability to control her powers, Barry inspires her to mimic Goldface's abilities to stall him while he defeats his crew as the Flash. Later, Barry reveals his identity to her, though she had already deduced it, and agrees to train and communicate with her. Meanwhile, Caitlin and her date Dr. Marcus Ficus are interrupted by Frost and Mark. Caitlin angrily expresses her distrust for Mark, though Mark helps her realize that she was afraid to commit to Marcus and instead focused on her hatred. Caitlin apologizes to Frost and Mark. Meanwhile, objects in Joe's house begin disappearing before Iris. She seemingly loses time and her eyes flash green.
Graphic Novel #6: Death Revisited
159	8	"The Fire Next Time"	David McWhirter	Joshua V. Gilbert	March 23, 2022	T27.14808	0.69
The recently-paroled Jaco Birch is arrested for the incineration of O'Shaughnessy's manager Stan Mullen, whom he was arguing with a night prior. He professes his innocence and his desire to be there for his son Harold. With there being no hard evidence against Jaco and with it being Henry Allen's birthday, Barry tries to convince his team of Jaco's innocence. Flash and Frost find bartender Donna Winters incinerated, but Chester discovers that the methods of burning do not match Jaco's abilities. Flash and Frost stop Jaco from kidnapping Harold from social services and the three of them work together to stop a lava channel from erupting. At CCC Media, Iris has Allegra interview social media influencer Rosie Levin with her constituent Taylor Downs, but Allegra shirks the interview to pursue a story involving ex-con Lydia Sanchez. Iris publishes both stories and has Allegra apologize to Taylor, but she refuses to listen. That night, Jaco and Harold reunite while Joe's family celebrates Henry's birthday. Later, Team Flash focuses their efforts on finding the real killer.
160	9	"Phantoms"	Stefan Pleszczynski	Jeff Hersh	March 30, 2022	T27.14809	0.54
Deon visits Iris to treat her for her "time sickness," though he is unsure of what it is or how she contracted it. Barry and Chester discover another incineration and contain a mysterious "Black Flame" from it. Chester has a nightmare of it breaking out. The Black Flame does so and he fears that it is the ghost of his father Quincy. It manifests as him and strikes again; Cecile realizes that it is feeding off of Chester's grief. Chester rejects the entity and it disappears. Joe returns and states that the incinerated victims were dealing with grief; the team deduces that the Black Flame is a sentient entity trying to survive. Meanwhile, Iris and Sue Dearbon travel to Coast City to investigate the Coast City Phantom, who they identify as Tinya Wazzo. While searching for her, Iris opens up to Sue about her time sickness. They find Tinya at her missing adoptive mother's home. She has also been searching for her birth mother, who abandoned her, and Iris convinces her to come with her and Sue. That night, Deon visits Iris with bad news.
161	10	"Reckless"	Kellie Cyrus	Jess Carson	April 6, 2022	T27.14810	0.57
Deon tells Barry and Iris that she is causing time to fracture around her. After Frost is attacked by the Black Flame, she and Carla Tannhauser enact a plan to amplify Frost's cryokinetic abilities to draw it out and trap it in a fusion sphere, but fail, injuring Frost. Caitlin is upset that Carla would use Frost as bait, but Carla reveals that she will soon develop cryokinetic abilities, so the plan will work if she and Frost draw out the Black Flame together. However, the sphere's structural integrity is compromised and Carla goes into cardiac arrest. Frost pulls her out and the Black Flame escapes. Team Flash comes together later to revamp the plan. In Coast City, Iris and Sue bring Tinya to an adoption agency to find her mother. The receptionist leaves and returns to find the entire room completely empty. Tinya finds her mother Renee and they talk, but Iris' eyes flash green and Renee vanishes in a green light. Meanwhile, the Black Flame appears to Caitlin and speaks to her using Ronnie Raymond's voice.
162	11	"Resurrection"	Greg Beeman	Emily Palizzi	April 13, 2022	T27.14811	0.64
Ronnie begs Caitlin to save him. At S.T.A.R. Labs, she recognizes each of the Black Flame victims and realizes that it has been searching for her. Despite Barry's suspicions that the Black Flame is manipulating her, she and Chester devise a plan to rescue him. She also tells Marcus, who then breaks up with her. Ronnie contacts Cecile and begs her to set him free. She feels his agony and proposes to Team Flash that they put him out of his misery. The Black Flame then goes to where Ronnie and Caitlin proposed to one another and the Flash tries to trap him in the fusion sphere. Caitlin and Frost arrive and destroy it; Caitlin uses a quantum splicer on the Black Flame. Ronnie is freed and he faints. Meanwhile, Allegra worries that Chester's openly-sourced technology will fall into the wrong hands. In Coast City, Tinya angrily causes Iris to disappear. Sue goes back to Central City and tells Barry. That night, Ronnie awakens and reveals to Caitlin that he is not the real Ronnie and transforms into Deathstorm.
163	12	"Death Rises"	Philip Chipera	Story by : Alex Boyd; Teleplay by : Arielle McAlpin & Dan Fisk	April 27, 2022	T27.14812	0.56
The Flash rescues Caitlin from Deathstorm, who escapes and continues incinerating people. Cecile connects to S.T.A.R. Labs' search systems to track him, but he possesses her and demands Caitlin. He then attacks with a manifestation of Esperanza Garcia and kidnaps Caitlin, planning to make her his bride, but then releases her since she "isn't ready." Team Flash finds that Ronnie's grief was transported away by the singularity and that it has been traveling through space for seven years. Chester begins modifying the Mental Augmentation Chamber (MAC) so that it can emit cosmic energy to harm Deathstorm and Frost volunteers to harness it. Meanwhile, Iris' time sickness pulls her into the Still Force and returns, but she infects Deon and he vanishes. Sue is able to stop Iris from doing the same. That night, Eddie appears in her apartment.
164	13	"Death Falls"	Chris Peppe	Story by : Sam Chalsen; Teleplay by : Joshua V. Gilbert	May 4, 2022	T27.14813	0.53
Eddie, a manifestation conjured by Deathstorm, attempts to goad Iris into grieving his death, but she resists. Sue wakes up and they contact Joe for help. At S.T.A.R. Labs, Caitlin's condition worsens. Deathstorm attacks S.T.A.R. Labs and sends ghosts from Team Flash's past to haunt them and feed off their grief, fueling Caitlin's transformation. Deathstorm tells Frost that she has no grief or real emotions, since she is a copy of Caitlin made only for protecting her. Mark arrives at S.T.A.R. Labs and helps Frost transform into Hellfrost. She fights Deathstorm and absorbs his grief, but at the cost of her own life.
Interlude III
165	14	"Funeral for a Friend"	Vanessa Parise	Story by : Jonathan Butler & Gabriel Garza; Teleplay by : Jeff Hersh	May 11, 2022	T27.14814	0.48
Team Flash struggles to adjust to Frost's absence. Allegra and Cecile join the Flash in the field to stop Blockbuster, a bank robber who stole a powerful exosuit from Ivo Labs, but fail to detain him as he flees with untraceable cloaking technology. Iris collects stories about Frost's positive impact to use in her obituary. Chester and Allegra argue over the right way to honor Frost and Mark gets drunk at O'Shaughnessy's. Barry completes every item on Frost's bucket list. He convinces Caitlin to go to Frost's funeral, where she realizes that Frost's voice lives on in her. She then brings Mark to her apartment and resolves to bring Frost back. That night, after Blockbuster's defeat, Iris and Taylor discuss the Flash's new allies in the field. Iris then vanishes in a green light.
166	15	"Into the Still Force"	Eric Wallace	Lauren Barnett & Christina M. Walker	May 18, 2022	T27.14815	0.55
Barry realizes that Iris is missing and goes to Tinya for help, but to no avail. Deon returns and states that Iris is lost in the Still Force. Against Joe's advice, Barry follows him in with an isotopic sensor that can help locate her. They find Renee, but she vanishes again. Deon finds a temporal particle in place of Iris, but steals it, destroys the sensor, and escapes. Barry gets trapped in a facsimile of Joe's house with Nora, who Deon dragged in from 2049. Eventually, Barry connects to the Still Force and he and Nora break the temporal barriers blocking their escape. Meanwhile, Kramer brings in Chester to analyze a device found after an explosion. He discovers that it was built using his open-source tech, but later learns it was in an attempt to provide hot water to citizens in need. Later, someone hacks his computer and downloads all of his files. Though initially reluctant, Mark agrees to help Caitlin bring back Frost.
167	16	"The Curious Case of Bartholomew Allen"	Caity Lotz	Thomas Pound & Jess Carson	May 25, 2022	T27.14816	0.54
Captain Singh asks Barry to locate a gamma absorption array stolen from Mercury Labs. He finds the thief, Pytor Orloff, but is blasted by the array, causing him to age 30 years. The more Barry uses his speed, the faster he ages. He struggles to catch Orloff while suffering from body pain and memory loss. He and Cecile find a laptop with his work and Chester deduces that Orloff's plan is to become immortal by stealing energy from everyone in Central City, aging them hundreds of years. He activates his machine, though Barry is able to force the gamma field backwards, inverting the energy charge and reverting the changes to Orloff and Barry. Barry is de-aged to 29 years old and Orloff is sent to prison. One week later, Barry goes to Caitlin's apartment and learns about her plan to restore Frost. She refuses to accept that Frost is gone, so Barry wrecks her equipment.
Graphic Novel #7: It's All Negative
168	17	"Keep It Dark"	Danielle Panabaker	Kristen Kim & Emily Palizzi	June 8, 2022	T27.14817	0.58
A new speedster stops a fire at Ivo Labs, but also steals a Newton Battery. Fearing it could be Thawne, Barry checks on him on Lian Yu. Thawne is aware of Frost's death and deduces that the speedster started the fire by accident. Meanwhile, Lydia informs Allegra about hostility from their former gang, the Arañas, now led by Kimiyo Hoshi and Millie Rawlins. They attack CCC Media during an interview, so Chester activates a forcefield. Taylor exposes Allegra as a former member of the Arañas to her employees, so Allegra reveals herself as the light-based meta assisting the Flash to regain their trust. Allegra holds Hoshi and Rawlins off while Lydia exposes the Arañas live, prompting them to flee. Taylor reconciles with Allegra, but also tells her that she cannot hide from the world. Caitlin tells Team Flash that she needs to step back to figure things out. That night, the Flash catches the speedster returning the Newton Battery and she reveals herself as Meena Dhawan, its inventor. The Flash agrees to mentor her.
169	18	"The Man in the Yellow Tie"	Marcus Stokes	Sam Chalsen	June 15, 2022	T27.14818	0.50
Barry is shown the Biometric Lightning Oscillation Chamber (BLOC), which grants her speed, and is introduced to its co-inventor: the time remnant of Thawne from Flashpoint, though he does not remember his past or Barry. Barry tries to stop Meena from using the BLOC, but it connects her to the Negative Speed Force and she begins draining power junctions. The alternate Thawne states that he fell in love with Meena and had visions of the BLOC, but was unaware of the Negative Speed Force. He reminds Meena of their love and she disconnects from it. Later, Ray Palmer informs Team Flash that the Flashpoint Thawne was revived by the Time Wraiths (Note: As depicted in the seventh season of Legends of Tomorrow) and Barry theorizes that he was revived again and brought to Meena. Meanwhile, Cecile's powers grow when she stops a bank robbery and mugging, but is stalked by a mysterious woman. Mark contacts Caitlin with a new plan to revive Frost. John Diggle approaches the imprisoned Thawne on Lian Yu for help in opening his box, (Note: As depicted in the series finale of Arrow) but it disappears when Diggle chooses to remain with his family instead of accepting its power. Deon visits the imprisoned Thawne and tells him that it is time to "fulfill his destiny."
170	19	"Negative, Part One"	Jeff Byrd	Jonathan Butler & Gabriel Garza	June 22, 2022	T27.14819	0.59
The Flash reveals his identity to Meena and gives her the nickname Fast Track. Deon kills the imprisoned Thawne and attacks Meena and Flashpoint Thawne alongside Negative Force counterparts of Alexa Rivera and Bashir Malik. Iris reappears in 2049 and Joan Williams informs Bart and Nora that Iris' body is flooded with negative tachyons, preventing her from returning to 2022. Nora travels there to inform Team Flash and they realize that the Negative Forces infected Iris knowing that she would infect the Positive Forces. Meanwhile, Mark has Caitlin enter the Consciousness Resurrection Chamber (CRC). Cecile realizes that she stole Rosalind Dillon's powers. Joe brings them both to Iron Heights so Cecile can test her powers against Mona Taylor, but she ends up stealing her powers as well. Later, Barry helps Meena share her speed with Flashpoint Thawne and they fight the Negative Forces. Negative Deon summons Iris and uses her to shield himself from the Flash's attacks, killing her. The dead Thawne is resurrected in the other's body.
171	20	"Negative, Part Two"	Marcus Stokes	Eric Wallace	June 29, 2022	T27.14820	0.56
The Negative Forces transform Thawne into their new avatar. In the Negative Speed Force, they explain to Barry that this is their revenge for when he weakened them by removing Thawne's speed. Meanwhile, Cecile rescues Bashir and transfers her powers to him, which he uses to rescue the other Forces so they can aid Barry. Iris is saved by the Time Stone and Damien Darhk helps her resurrect herself. Jay Garrick reunites her with Barry. With help from the Forces, he reverses a powerful attack from Thawne back into him, destroying him and removing him from the timeline. After the universe "resets," Iris is cured of her time sickness and the speedsters return to their native times. The BLOC is depowered and Meena loses her speed. The CRC malfunctions and Mark encounters a new Frost claiming to be "a friend." Mona and Dillon's powers are restored while Cecile develops telekinesis. Tinya and Renee are reunited. Iris mentions that the Negative Speed Force will find a new avatar and Barry states that he'll be ready. A blue crystal is shown at a laboratory in 2049.

== Cast and characters ==
=== Main ===
- Grant Gustin as Barry Allen / The Flash / Reverse-Flash
- Candice Patton as Iris West-Allen
- Danielle Panabaker as Caitlin Snow and Frost / Hellfrost
- Danielle Nicolet as Cecile Horton
- Kayla Compton as Allegra Garcia
- Brandon McKnight as Chester P. Runk
- Jesse L. Martin as Joe West

=== Recurring ===
- Carmen Moore as Kristen Kramer
- Rachel Drance as Taylor Downs
- Tony Curran as Despero
- Stephanie Izsak as Daisy Korber
- Agam Darshi as Mona Taylor / Queen
- Christian Magby as Deon Owens and Negative Deon Owens
- Tom Cavanagh as Eobard Thawne / Reverse-Flash / The Flash
- Andres Soto as Marcus Ficus
- Jon Cor as Mark Blaine / Chillblaine (Note: Cor is credited in "Armageddon, Part 3", but does not appear.)
- Jessica Parker Kennedy as Nora West-Allen / XS
- Natalie Dreyfuss as Sue Dearbon
- Mika Abdalla as Tinya Wazzo / Phantom Girl
- Kausar Mohammed as Meena Dhawan / Fast Track

=== Guest ===
- Brandon Routh as Ray Palmer / The Atom
- Lindy Booth as Vanya Davis
- Shayan Bayat as Aariz Mousa
- Ryan Jefferson Booth as King
- Chyler Leigh as Alex Danvers / Sentinel
- Kandyse McClure as Xotar
- Cress Williams as Jefferson Pierce / Black Lightning
- Javicia Leslie as Ryan Wilder / Batwoman
- Osric Chau as Ryan Choi / The Atom
- Ashley Rickards as Rosalind Dillon / Top
- Neal McDonough as Damien Darhk
- Katherine McNamara as Mia Queen / Green Arrow
- Courtney Ford as Nora Darhk
- Rick Cosnett as Eddie Thawne
- Jordan Fisher as Bart Allen / Impulse
- Piper Curda as Avery Ho
- John Wesley Shipp as Jay Garrick / Flash
- Damion Poitier as Keith / Goldface
- Max Adler as Jaco Birch / Hotness
- Milton Barnes as Quincy P. Runk
- Susan Walters as Carla Tannhauser
- Robbie Amell as Ronnie Raymond and Deathstorm
- Alexa Barajas as Esperanza Garcia / Ultraviolet
- Michelle Harrison as Joan Williams, Nora Allen, and the Speed Force
- Deb Podowski as Councillor Strong
- Patrick Sabongui as David Singh
- Jeff Meadows as Pytor Orloff
- Emmie Nagata as Dr. Kimiyo Hoshi / Doctor Light
- Natalie Sharp as Millie Rawlins / Sunshine
- Matt Letscher as Eobard Thawne / Reverse-Flash
- David Ramsey as John Diggle
- Sara Garcia as Alexa Rivera / Fuerza and Negative Alexa Rivera
- Ennis Esmer as Bashir Malik / Psych and Negative Bashir Malik

== Production ==
=== Development ===
The season was announced on February 3, 2021, along with 11 other CW series, including Batwoman and Legends of Tomorrow.

=== Writing ===
Speaking to the events of the season, showrunner Eric Wallace said that Barry Allen / The Flash would become "the most confident, incredibly powerful, secure team leader". Wallace then commented that the series would return to Barry and Iris West-Allen's relationship. Wallace went on to hint that multiple relationships, including Joe West and Cecile Horton's, would be further explored and deepened in the season, as well as that Kristen Kramer and August Heart may return in this season. The graphic novel format for the series will continue in the eighth season. Wallace noted that one of the graphic novels would feature a new villain who is "a very scary fellow, and when he shows up, we might dip our toes into the world of horror and the supernatural." In September 2021, Wallace revealed that Joe West is "going to get an incredibly different perspective on life, and it will lead him to a very big choice."

Wallace also revealed that Iris' time sickness would be dealt with after "Armageddon", and that solving it is "a huge, huge part of the entire season, and it will take all season to solve that. And that will have big ramifications for Barry and Iris' relationship and marriage." In March 2022, Wallace confirmed that in writing the season finale, "it all gets resolved by the end of season 8, so we can start fresh and clean, should we, knock on wood, be able to have the privilege to do a season 9", while also writing two endings. Wallace also revealed that Nora West-Allen's sexuality would be acknowledged this season.

=== Casting ===
Series star Grant Gustin returns in the title role of Barry Allen / The Flash. By May 2021, it was unclear if Candice Patton and Danielle Panabaker would return since they were still "negotiating new deals to return". A month later, both actresses, along with Jesse L. Martin, closed their deals. Danielle Nicolet returns as Cecile Horton. In August 2021, it was announced that the guest appearances for the "Armageddon" event would include Tom Cavanagh as Eobard Thawne / Reverse-Flash, Javicia Leslie as Batwoman, Brandon Routh as The Atom, Cress Williams as Jefferson Pierce / Black Lightning, Chyler Leigh as Sentinel, Katherine McNamara as Mia Queen, Osric Chau as Ryan Choi, and Neal McDonough as Damien Darhk, with Tony Curran joining the cast as Despero shortly after in an undisclosed capacity. Courtney Ford cameos as Nora Darhk in the fifth episode while Katie Cassidy, Juliana Harkavy, and Ben Lewis appear through archive footage as Laurel Lance, Dinah Drake, and William Clayton.

In October 2021, it was announced that Rick Cosnett would reprise his role as Eddie Thawne in a singular flashback episode after the "Armageddon" event. However, in February 2022, it was announced that Cosnett would recur in a "multi-episode arc." In November 2021, it was announced that Max Adler would be guest-starring as Jaco Birch / Hotness from season four for one episode. Later that month, it was announced that Robbie Amell would be returning as Ronnie Raymond / Firestorm for two episodes. In December 2021, newcomer Mika Abdalla was announced as Tinya Wazzo / Phantom Girl. On April 13, 2022, it was announced that this season would be Martin's last as a series regular, though he would still appear in the ninth season.

=== Filming ===
Filming began on August 16, 2021, and concluded on April 27, 2022.

=== Arrowverse tie-ins ===
The first five episodes of the season were crossover event episodes, featuring other actors and heroes from the Arrowverse. The CW President Mark Pedowitz said the episodes would "not quite be a crossover, but it will have a crossover-type feel". One of these potential appearances was Cress Williams, reprising his role from the Arrowverse series Black Lightning as Jefferson Pierce / Black Lightning, who indicated in May 2021 that he had been approached to make a guest appearance in the season and was in talks to appear. Williams said he was "down" to appear since he enjoyed being a part of the "Crisis on Infinite Earths" crossover and felt he and Gustin got along well during their scenes together. Pedowitz also indicated at that time that other actors had also been approached. Re-elaborating in July 2021, Wallace said that the five-episode event would not be like a typical Arrowverse crossover, noting that "I think it'll give people that sense of scope that you sometimes feel—both emotionally and in the action sequences—with a crossover, without actually having 20 characters in one scene." However, because of the COVID-19 pandemic, restrictions were put in place that limited some of the crew's options. In August 2021, it was announced that the crossover event would be known as "Armageddon" with multiple Arrowverse heroes and villains returning. Wallace described the event as "the most emotional Flash episodes ever" with "some truly epic moments and huge surprises". In November 2021, The Flash showrunner Eric Wallace urged viewers to rewatch the Arrow episode "Green Arrow & The Canaries", as the "Armageddon" event would provide several answers to the loose ends left behind by the episode.

== Marketing ==
At the virtual 2021 DC FanDome event on October 16, 2021, stars Grant Gustin and Candice Patton revealed the new golden boots as part of the costume in the new season. The first trailer for the "Armageddon" event was released on October 19, 2021, three days after DC FanDome. The official poster for "Armageddon" was released on November 3, 2021. On February 25, 2022, The CW released a new official poster ahead of the mid-season premiere.

== Release ==
The season premiered on The CW on November 16, 2021.

Two weeks before the premiere, on November 5, 2021, the CW announced their mid-season schedule for their shows, announcing that after "Armageddon", the season would begin airing on Wednesdays starting March 9, 2022. Prior to the season premiere, Wallace stated that the season would have 18 episodes, but it was later confirmed to have 20 episodes.

== Ratings ==
Viewership and ratings per episode of The Flash season 8
No.	Title	Air date	Rating (18–49)	Viewers (millions)	DVR (18–49)	DVR viewers (millions)	Total (18–49)	Total viewers (millions)
1	"Armageddon, Part 1"	November 16, 2021	0.2	0.75	0.1	0.46	0.4	1.21
2	"Armageddon, Part 2"	November 23, 2021	0.1	0.67	0.1	0.45	0.3	1.12
3	"Armageddon, Part 3"	November 30, 2021	0.2	0.73	0.1	0.46	0.3	1.19
4	"Armageddon, Part 4"	December 7, 2021	0.2	0.73	0.2	0.47	0.3	1.20
5	"Armageddon, Part 5"	December 14, 2021	0.2	0.72	—N/a	—N/a	—N/a	—N/a
6	"Impulsive Excessive Disorder"	March 9, 2022	0.1	0.59	0.1	0.42	0.3	1.01
7	"Lockdown"	March 16, 2022	0.1	0.56	0.1	0.43	0.2	0.99
8	"The Fire Next Time"	March 23, 2022	0.1	0.69	0.1	0.37	0.3	1.06
9	"Phantoms"	March 30, 2022	0.1	0.54	0.2	0.47	0.2	1.01
10	"Reckless"	April 6, 2022	0.1	0.57	0.1	0.38	0.2	0.95
11	"Resurrection"	April 13, 2022	0.2	0.64	0.1	0.44	0.3	1.07

No DVR ratings are available after the eleventh episode.
