= Ray Palmer (Arrowverse) =

Fictional character in the Arrowverse

- Arrowverse character
- Promotional picture of Brandon Routh as Ray Palmer / The Atom.
- First appearance: "The Calm"; Arrow; October 8, 2014
- Last appearance: "The Man in the Yellow Tie"; The Flash; June 15, 2022
- Based on: Atom (Ray Palmer) by: Gardner Fox; Gil Kane; Murphy Anderson
- Adapted by: Greg Berlanti; Marc Guggenheim; Andrew Kreisberg
- Portrayed by: Brandon Routh; Jack Fisher (young)
- Voiced by: Brandon Routh

In-universe information
- Full name: Raymond Carson Palmer
- Alias: The Atom
- Affiliation: Team Arrow; The Legends
- Spouse: Nora Darhk
- Significant others: Anna Loring (fiancé; deceased); Kendra Saunders (ex-fiancé)

Raymond Palmer, also known by his superhero alias The Atom, is a fictional character in Arrowverse television franchise, where he is portrayed by Brandon Routh. The character debuted in 2014, in the episode "The Calm", the premiere of Arrow's third season, before being spun off into the science fiction time travel series Legends of Tomorrow. Routh appeared on Legends of Tomorrow for five seasons before being written off for creative reasons. The character was based on Atom, a comic book character created by Gardner Fox, Gil Kane and Murphy Anderson.

== Fictional biography ==
Sometime prior to early 2014, Ray became engaged to Anna Loring. While in Starling City, both Ray and Anna were caught in the crossfire of Slade Wilson's siege on the city, resulting Anna's death. Ray promised to avenge her death by finding a way to save his city from similar danger.

=== Arrow ===
Ray, a tech billionaire, meets Felicity Smoak and becomes interested in her. Sometime later, he visits Queen Consolidated and meets with its CEO Oliver Queen about purchasing the company. Ray became its CEO and renames the company "Palmer Tech", aiming to providing free energy to the Starling City. During this time, he contributes money to the city and develops the ATOM Exosuit, which he wears and uses to defend Felicity during an attack by a supervillain. Ray and Felicity begin dating. Soon after, Ray uses facial recognition technology and discovers the vigilante known as the Arrow is Queen. Ray fights Queen and is defeated, but is spared, resulting in Queen gaining Ray's trust. Soon after, an impersonator of Arrow attacks Ray, sending him to the hospital. Ray begins to improve the suit and stops dating Felicity, joining Arrow's team. However, while performing a maintenance check on the suit an accident occurs which results in his office exploding; Ray is presumed dead.

Six months later, Felicity discovers Ray is alive and has been captured by Damien Darhk. He is rescued by Team Arrow and names Felicity as the new CEO of Palmer Technologies. Ray is able to develop shrinking abilities within the suit, allowing him to shrink himself and others.

=== Legends of Tomorrow ===
Feeling directionless, Ray is recruited by Rip Hunter to join his team, the Legends, to travel back in time to stop a man named Vandal Savage, a future dictator and immortal, before he can rise to power. During their mission, he leaves a piece of his armor behind, changing history and necessitating the team to go back in time to retrieve it. In an attempt to find the Aton dagger, one of the few weapons that can kill Savage, however Carter Hall is killed in the process. Ray begins to date Kendra Saunders, Carter's lover. During a second attempt to steal the dagger, Ray and Kendra are separated from the team and become trapped in the 1950s for two years before being found. Subsequently, Ray proposes to Kendra, which she agrees to. Ray and the other members of the team are eventually successful in killing Savage. However, Kendra calls off the engagement and leaves the Legends to be with a reincarnation of Carter.

During a mission gone wrong, the members of the team are scattered through time. Ray winds up in 70 million BC and spends six months trapped there before being rescued. During a later mission in Feudal Japan, Ray has his suit taken and is forced to destroy it. He struggles to find his place on the team without the ATOM suit. Ray is eventually able to repair his suit after being gifted a rare metal by Jonah Hex in the Old West. Ray helps the team with locating pieces of the Spear of Destiny with the aim of destroying it, but Eobard Thawne takes the Spear and uses it to create a new reality. The Legends to the past to protect their past selves and kill Thawne. The original Legends are erased from time. However, in meeting their past selves they "broke time" causing anachronisms throughout history. Rip founds an organization known as the Time Bureau to fix time and the Legends are forced into retirement. However, they ignore the Bureau and continue time traveling.

After Nora Darhk becomes possessed by a malicious entity called Mallus, Ray is worried she will die. He attempts to save her life but is instead kidnapped by her and ordered to repair an item called the "Fire Totem". After fixing the totem he is released unharmed due to Nora's affection for him. The rest of the team aids Ray and gather the other Totems, which they use to stop Mallus. Ray later searches for Nora, and the two confess their love for each other. Ray is later possessed by the demon Neron. Ray gives Neron control of his body in exchange for Neron sparing the life of his best friend Nate Heywood. Neron claims his soul and Ray is sent to Hell. Nora and John Constantine travel to Hell to free Ray's soul, meanwhile Nate tricks Neron into killing him, breaking his promise and surrendering Ray's body. Later, Ray decides to leave the team, marrying Nora to live a peaceful life.

=== Appearances ===
Routh has appeared in five of the seven Arrowverse television series. In 2014, he made his debut as Ray in recurring role in season 3 of Arrow. He then appeared in a 2015 episode of The Flash titled "All Star Team Up". The following year he returned in Arrow's fourth season in a reduced capacity. In 2016, Legends of Tomorrow premiered with Routh as a series regular. The same year, he appeared in three episodes of the animated show Vixen. While Routh stated he was willing to reprise his role on Supergirl, this never materialized until 2019 when he appeared in both Supergirl and Batwoman as part of the "Crisis on Infinite Earths" crossover event. Routh made his final appearance as a series regular in the 2020 Legends of Tomorrow episode "Romeo v Juliet: Dawn of Justness". In 2022, he made a guest star appearance alongside other former series regulars in "Wvrdr error 100 <oest-of-th3-gs.gid30n> not found", the 100th episode of the series. He also returned to the character for The Flash episodes "Armageddon, Part 1" and "The Man in the Yellow Tie" in 2021 and 2022 respectively.

Additionally, Routh voiced Ray Palmer in the 2018 video game Lego DC Super-Villains.

== Creation and development ==
=== Casting ===
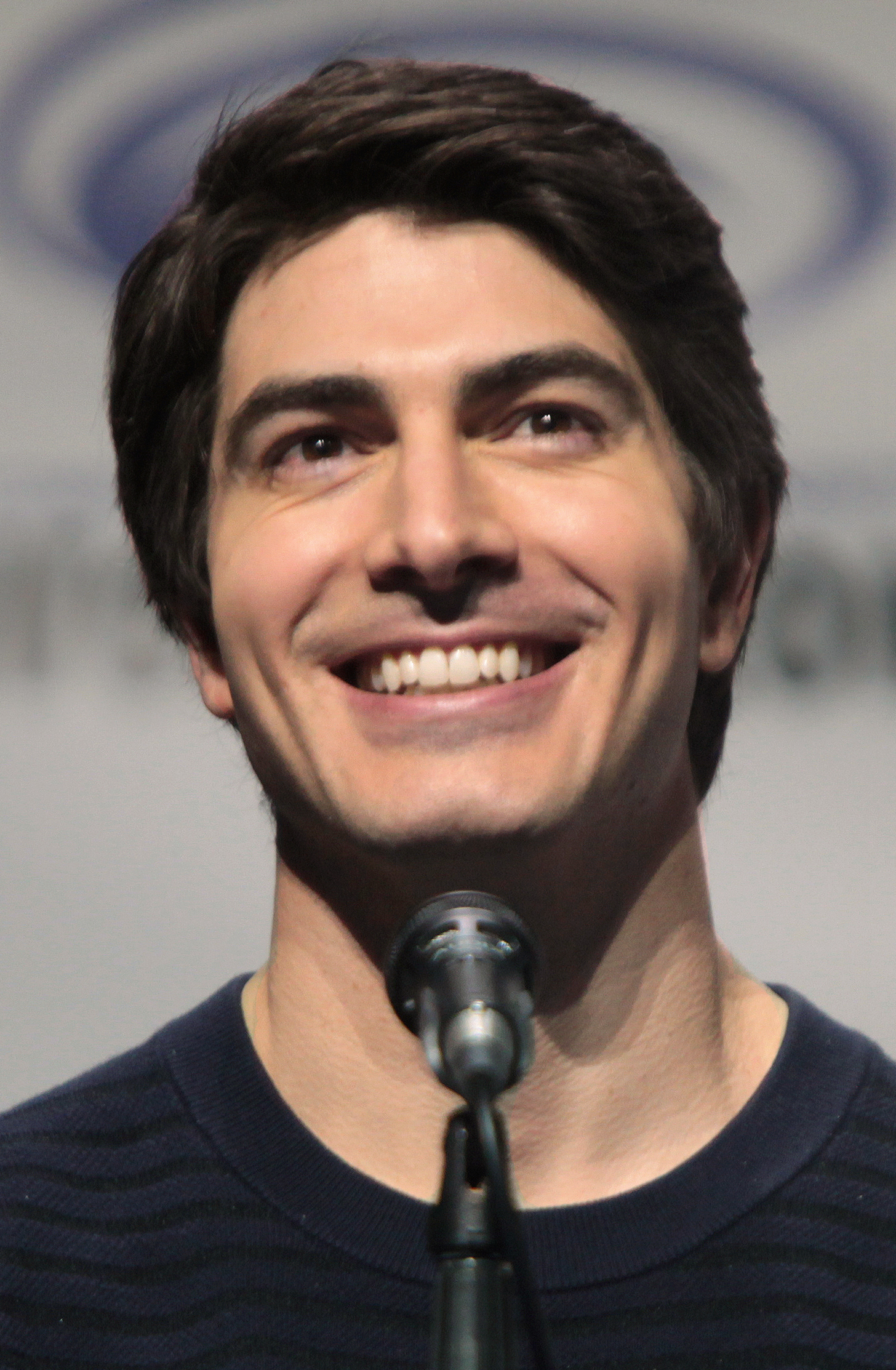
Brandon Routh speaking at the 2016 WonderCon in Los Angeles, California

According to Andrew Kreisberg the Arrow producers had planned to adapt Ted Kord / Blue Beetle into the series. However, executives at DC declined and instead offered them Ray Palmer / The Atom. In July 2014, it was announced that Brandon Routh had been cast as Ray in the then upcoming third season of Arrow. Atom was described as "an unparalleled scientist, and inventor, with a go-getter aspect" who would shake Oliver Queen's world. The show's producer Marc Guggenheim said he would be a "sloppy" superhero. Routh said Ray would come "in the middle" of Oliver's and Felicity's relationship, but with no bad intentions. Routh was hesitant to accept the role due to his prior role as Superman in the 2005 film Superman Returns.

In 2015, when Routh was asked how it felt to play another superhero, he said that he was "a little wary at first. I never really thought that I'd play another hero in the DC world having played kind of the pinnacle of them all. But it's been a lot of fun bringing Ray to life." He added he had never read any Atom comic books, however he was fascinated by the 1980s Sword of the Atom comic miniseries. When asked about if his Atom character has put Superman in the rear-view mirror, he said: "I don't know if I've put Superman in the rear- view mirror, but to have something else that people know me for is cool".

In the Legends of Tomorrow season three episode "Phone Home", a younger version of Ray appeared portrayed by Jack Fisher.

=== Development ===
Greg Berlanti, the co-creator of Legends of Tomorrow, had stated the show was supposed to be an Atom-centered spin-off series, with Routh starring in it, because they saw the charisma Routh had brought to the character.

=== Departure ===
Routh, alongside Courtney Ford (Nora Darhk), left Legends of Tomorrow following the season 5 episode "Romeo v Juliet: Dawn of Justness". On a promotion post to Instagram, Routh stated that his exit was not his decision. Executive Producer Phil Klemmer stated that neither Routh nor Ford requested to be written off, rather their exit was a creative decision as the writers felt the character had reached the natural conclusion of their arcs. Routh told Inverse that, "nobody, to my knowledge, in the crew wanted to see me go". He described leaving the show as "traumatic". Routh returned as Ray for the 100th episode of Legends of Tomorrow, telling Syfy's Matthew Jackson that he returned to the show because he did not like his original exit and he wanted to show a more mature version of the character.

Routh again returned to the character for The Flash episodes "Armageddon, Part 1" and "The Man in the Yellow Tie". In an interview with Tim Beedle for DC.com, he said he found it easier to return for The Flash then for Legends of Tomorrow. He explained, "It was actually easier on The Flash than it was on Legends in some ways because Flash is a through line story. The episode is largely about Ray and him helping Team Flash, and also what his journey has been since he left the Waverider and where his mindset it." While Routh described his Legends of Tomorrow return as, "kind of like a flashback episode. We were revisiting older versions of the characters and there were many people in the scenes—it's different to shoot that way, a multi-person scene versus a scene with just a couple of people moving the episode forward."

== Characterization ==
In an interview with Comic Book Resources, Routh stated that his character suffered from anxiety, and that he had personal issues about his harsh childhood. In an interview with Den of Geek, Routh noted that when transitioning the character from Arrow to Legends of Tomorrow he was retooled to be more nerdy and less cool. He also noted how the character was initially portrayed as a leader in Arrow before becoming an ensemble player in Legends of Tomorrow.

Kathrine E. Whaley and Justin Wigard writing in Arrow and Superhero Television: Essays on Themes and Characters of the Series noted how Ray represented a threat to Oliver Queen's role as the Arrow and as the "savior" of Starling City. Noting how their first interaction in "The Calm" encapsulates Oliver's declining power.

== Reception ==
In a review of the third season of Arrow for ScreenCrush, Kevin Fitzpatrick criticized the character, describing him as the showrunners valuing "concept over character" and that Ray had poor chemistry with the other characters. However, he did find Ray enjoyable while in his Atom suit. The romantic pairing of Ray and Felicity was a popular "ship" by fans of Arrow, though notably less popular than the main pairing of Oliver and Felicity.

Inverse's Eric Francisco noted that Ray bears similarities to the Marvel Cinematic Universe character Tony Stark. Critic Alan Sepinwall found Ray's presence in the first season was redundant as Martin Stein played a similar role. In 2019, Routh was nominated at the Teen Choice Awards in the Choice Action TV Actor category, losing to Stephen Amell for Arrow. CarrieLynn D. Reinhard and Vincent Tran Televisual Shared Universes: Expanded and Converged Storyworlds on the Small Screen criticized Routh's dual roles in "Crisis on Infinite Earths" as Ray and Superman, calling it a "flaw" in casting and noting how the episodes failed to give an in-universe reason for it.

Following the announcement of Routh's departure, ComicBook.com's Russ Burlingame stated it would be beneficial for Ray's character arc but worsen the show itself.
