= Arrowverse =

American superhero media franchise and shared universe

- Promotional image for the 2016–17 television season
- Created by: Greg Berlanti; Marc Guggenheim; Andrew Kreisberg; Geoff Johns; Ali Adler; Phil Klemmer; Salim Akil; Caroline Dries
- Original work: Arrow
- Years: 2012–2023
- Based on: Characters from DC Comics

Films and television
- Television series: Arrow; The Flash; Supergirl; Legends of Tomorrow; Black Lightning; Batwoman
- Web series: Vixen; Freedom Fighters: The Ray

Miscellaneous
- Crossovers: Constantine; The Flash (1990)

The Arrowverse is an American superhero media franchise and shared universe that is centered on various interconnected television series based on DC Comics superhero characters, primarily airing on The CW as well as web series on CW Seed. The series were developed by Greg Berlanti, Marc Guggenheim, Andrew Kreisberg, Geoff Johns, Ali Adler, Phil Klemmer, Salim Akil, and Caroline Dries. Set in a shared fictional multiverse much like the DC Universe and DC Multiverse in comic books, it was established by crossing over common plot elements, settings, cast and characters that span six live-action television series and two animated series.

The franchise began with Arrow, based on the character Green Arrow, which debuted in October 2012. It was followed by The Flash in 2014, and the animated web series Vixen in 2015. The franchise further expanded in January 2016 with the debut of Legends of Tomorrow, starring characters who previously appeared on both Arrow and The Flash. Later that year, the CBS series Supergirl, having already crossed over with The Flash, moved to The CW for the remainder of its run. A second animated web series, Freedom Fighters: The Ray, was released in 2017, which followed Ray Terrill / The Ray, who would make a live-action appearance during that year's crossover event "Crisis on Earth-X". In addition to the live-action and web-based series, the franchise has spawned three promotional tie-in live-action web series: Blood Rush, Chronicles of Cisco and The Flash: Stretched Scenes; released in 2013, 2016 and 2017 respectively. A fifth series, Batwoman, premiered in 2019. Six ensemble crossover events involving many of the live-action series of the Arrowverse have taken place, beginning with "Flash vs. Arrow" in 2014 and concluding with "Crisis on Infinite Earths" between 2019 and 2020. Additionally, Matt Ryan has reprised his role as John Constantine from the NBC series Constantine, initially in guest appearances in episodes of Arrow and Legends of Tomorrow, before becoming a series regular for the latter, in addition to continuing storylines from the former series. In 2023, the franchise concluded with the ninth and final season of The Flash.

The 2018 and 2019 crossovers, "Elseworlds" and "Crisis on Infinite Earths", saw multiple DC television series and films retroactively added to the franchise's multiverse. "Crisis on Infinite Earths" also rebooted the multiverse, with Supergirl joining the other live-action series on a new Earth-Prime along with the series Black Lightning, which had been separate up to that point. The franchise has been successful, creating a large fandom around the world, and has received positive reviews; critics have praised the themes, acting, action sequences, direction and character development.

== Development ==
In January 2012, The CW ordered a pilot for Arrow, revolving around the character Green Arrow and developed by Andrew Kreisberg, Greg Berlanti, and Marc Guggenheim. Stephen Amell was cast in the titular role. When developing the series, Guggenheim said that the creative team wanted to "chart [their] own course, [their] own destiny", and avoid any direct connections to the series Smallville, which featured its own Green Arrow (Justin Hartley). In July 2013, it was announced that Berlanti, Kreisberg, and Geoff Johns would be creating a spin-off television series based on The Flash. The character, played by Grant Gustin, was set to appear in three episodes of Arrow's second season. The third episode was supposed to act as a backdoor pilot for the new series, but a traditional pilot was eventually ordered instead.

In November 2014, Berlanti expressed interest in making his CBS series Supergirl exist in the same universe as Arrow and The Flash, and in January 2015, The CW president Mark Pedowitz revealed that he was also open to a crossover among the series and networks. However, CBS president Nina Tassler stated that month that, "those two shows are on a different network. So I think we'll keep Supergirl to ourselves for a while." In August 2015, Tassler revealed that while there were no plans at the time to do story crossovers, the three series would have crossover promotions.

In January 2015, the CW announced that an animated web-series featuring the DC heroine Vixen would debut on CW Seed in late 2015 and be set in the same universe as both Arrow and The Flash. Amell and Gustin would reprise their respective roles in the series, and the character of Vixen was expected to make a live-action appearance on The Flash and/or Arrow as well. The next month, it was reported that another spin-off series, described as a superhero team-up show, was being discussed by The CW for a possible 2015–16 midseason release. Berlanti, Kreisberg, Guggenheim and Sarah Schechter would be executive producers of the potential series, which would be headlined by several recurring characters from both Arrow and The Flash. That May, the CW officially confirmed DC's Legends of Tomorrow for a January 2016 premiere. Pedowitz later stated, "There is no intention, at this point, to spin anything else off" to add to the universe, though after Vixen was renewed for a second season he said, "Hopefully, that character could actually spin itself out, if not, maybe join as one of the Legends" in Legends of Tomorrow. In October, additional Arrow showrunner Wendy Mericle revealed that the producers had begun having someone track all the characters and plots used by each series, in order to make sure everything lines up, but the following April, The Flash executive producer Aaron Helbing noted that "sometimes the schedules don't line up exactly...and that stuff is out of our control", such as when Barry was shown using his abilities on Arrow, while not having them the same week on The Flash.

In January 2016, Tassler's successor Glenn Geller said "I have to be really careful what I say here" in regards to a potential Supergirl / Arrowverse crossover, so "Watch and wait and see what happens." The following month, it was announced that Gustin would appear on the Supergirl episode "Worlds Finest". Berlanti and Kreisberg, also Supergirl executive producers, thanked "the fans and journalists who have kept asking for this to happen. It is our pleasure and hope to create an episode worthy of everyone's enthusiasm and support." In "Worlds Finest", Supergirl is established as being in an alternate universe where the Flash helps Kara fight the Silver Banshee and Livewire in exchange for her help in returning home. The events of the episode intersect with the events of the eighteenth episode of The Flash season two, "Versus Zoom". The crossover required "a lot more logistical trickery" than the usual Arrowverse crossovers, due to Gustin filming The Flash in Vancouver alongside Arrow and Legends of Tomorrow, while Supergirl was produced in Los Angeles. The producers chose to use the Flash as the character to crossover, due to his ability to travel between various Earths, and because it was "a little more fun at first to bring the veteran from that show to the chemistry of a new show." Berlanti stated that "in a perfect world", the crossover would have featured both Gustin and Amell's Green Arrow, "but logistically that would have been a nightmare to try and do both shows. We had to facilitate one." Gustin was optimistic that the crossover in 2016 would allow another crossover the following year with the rest of the Arrowverse shows.

In May, it was announced that Supergirl would move from CBS to The CW for its second season, and that production would move from Los Angeles to Vancouver, where the CW Arrowverse series film. The second season premiered on October 10, 2016. It was also announced that Supergirl would appear on Arrow, The Flash, and Legends of Tomorrow during the 2016–17 season crossover episodes, though Guggenheim cautioned that "She is going to be coming over but we're not going to do a full on Supergirl crossover". Kreisberg also confirmed that, despite the series moving to The CW, the title character's universe would not be integrated into Earth-1, the main universe of Arrow, The Flash and Legends of Tomorrow, and would continue to exist in a parallel universe. The Earth the Supergirl series inhabits is Earth-38 in the broader multiverse, and has been informally referred to as "Earth-CBS" by Guggenheim, named for the network where Supergirl first aired. In August, the CW announced the animated web-series Freedom Fighters: The Ray for CW Seed, intending that the actor cast as Raymond "Ray" Terrill would appear in the live-action series, much like Mari McCabe / Vixen.

In May 2017, The CW ordered Black Lightning to series. The series had previously been in development at Fox, at which point Berlanti had stated Black Lightning would not crossover with his other DC Comics television properties on The CW, nor would it exist in the Arrowverse. With the move to The CW, Pedowitz said the series "at this time, is not part of the Arrowverse. It is a separate situation." Showrunners Salim Akil later clarified that they were not ruling out eventual crossovers, but wanted to establish the series and its own world first.

In July 2018, it was revealed that the CW was developing a script for a potential series centered on Batwoman, intending to launch it after the character debuted in the "Elseworlds" crossover event. The series, if picked up, would be written by Caroline Dries, with plans to air in 2019. In August, Ruby Rose was cast as Kate Kane / Batwoman. In December, it was announced that "Crisis on Infinite Earths" would be the fifth annual crossover, following the "Elseworlds" crossover. Further details explained that "Crisis" would run for five hours, marking the Arrowverse's longest crossover, and that the five parts would not air on consecutive nights, as with previous crossovers. Instead, three episodes would air in December 2019 and two in January 2020. It would also include Batwoman and Legends, which were not part of the "Elseworlds" crossover.

In January 2019, Batwoman received a pilot pick-up from the CW. On January 31, 2019, the four series already running on The CW were confirmed for further seasons, carrying them through the 2019–20 television season. On March 6, 2019, it was announced that the eighth season of Arrow would be the final season of the series, with an abbreviated ten-episode season. On May 7, The CW ordered Batwoman to series. Discussing a potential Black Lightning crossover with the Arrowverse in July 2019, Cress Williams revealed that "there's been lots of talk [...] nothing official, but at this point, I wouldn't be surprised." Two weeks later in August, Williams confirmed reports that characters from Black Lightning would appear in "Crisis on Infinite Earths". Also in August, it was reported that another untitled spin-off has been plotted. In September 2019, it was reported that The CW was developing a female led spin-off series with Katherine McNamara, Katie Cassidy and Juliana Harkavy as the leads. The following month, Marc Guggenheim released an image indicating Green Arrow and the Canaries as a potential name for the show. The same month, a Superman & Lois spinoff series entered development with Tyler Hoechlin and Elizabeth Tulloch reprising their roles as Clark Kent / Superman and Lois Lane from Supergirl.

In January 2020, the five series running on The CW (The Flash, Supergirl, Legends of Tomorrow, Batwoman, and Black Lightning) were confirmed for further seasons, carrying them through the 2020–21 television season. Superman & Lois was also ordered to series. At the end of "Crisis on Infinite Earths", the new Earth-Prime was formed, which saw Black Lightning's earth merge with the former Earth-1 and Earth-38, creating a fictional universe where all of The CW series exist together. On September 22, 2020, it was announced that Supergirl would conclude after its sixth season. A backdoor pilot for a potential spinoff based on Painkiller was in development, directed by Salim Akil, and aired as the seventh episode of the fourth season of Black Lightning with Jordan Calloway reprising his role from the show. On November 16, a series centered on the Yara Flor version of Wonder Girl was in development from Gerg Berlanti and Dailyn Rodriguez. On November 20, 2020, Black Lightning was announced to conclude after its fourth season. The CW officially passed on the Arrow-spinoff Green Arrow and the Canaries in January 2021, passed on Wonder Girl in February 2021, and passed on the Black Lightning-spinoff Painkiller in May 2021.

In February 2021, the three remaining series that were not set to conclude at the time (The Flash, Legends of Tomorrow and Batwoman) were confirmed for further seasons, carrying them through the 2021–22 television season. In March 2021, Superman & Lois was renewed for a second season. In January 2022, Justice U was in development from Michael Narducci and Zoanne Clack. It would star David Ramsey reprising his role as John Diggle, in which Diggle recruits five young meta humans to live undercover as freshmen at a prestigious university, with Diggle overseeing their education and training. Ramsey would also direct the pilot if ordered, with Berlanti, Schechter, David Madden, and Johns executive producing alongside Narducci and Clack. In March 2022, The Flash and Superman & Lois were both confirmed for a ninth and third season respectively, carrying them through the 2022–23 television season. In April 2022, Batwoman and Legends of Tomorrow were both canceled. On August 1, 2022, it was announced that The Flash would be concluding with its upcoming ninth season, which also acted as the conclusion of the Arrowverse, due to Superman & Lois having been confirmed to take place in an adjacent universe. In May 2023, The CW officially passed on Justice U. The Arrowverse concluded with the series finale of The Flash, "A New World, Part Four", on May 24, 2023.

=== Name ===
In August 2015, in a video about the production of Vixen's first season, Guggenheim referred to the series' shared universe as the "Arrowverse". Kreisberg confirmed that this was the name the producers used for it. The universe has also been referred to by the media as the "Flarrowverse", "Berlanti-verse" and "DC TV-verse".

In September 2020, The CW released a trailer for the various series that would be airing on the network in 2021, which featured the name "The CWverse" in it. Many outlets felt the change was due to Arrow having ended and the character no longer a part of the shared universe. However, Matt Webb Mitovich of TVLine felt that with the inclusion of Stargirl in the trailer, which exists on a parallel earth to the Arrowverse, the name was perhaps a way to discuss all of the superhero series airing on network at the time. Mitovich also pointed out the term had been used a year prior in a similar trailer, which had featured the Arrowverse series plus Black Lightning, which was not part of the universe at that time. Jake Abbate of SuperHeroHype also referred to the name as encompassing the "programming block" of superhero shows on the network. Daniel Gillespie from Screen Rant felt if this was The CW's attempt to change the Arrowverse's name, that fans and the media would not "suddenly start" using the name, and if The CW kept using the term, could "lead to a situation where the universe is called one thing officially, but another entirely by the majority of people who watch it". In May 2021, when discussing the 2021–22 season of shows, Pedowitz referred to the series as the "CWverse".

== Television series ==
Six television series make up the Arrowverse franchise: Arrow, The Flash, Supergirl, Legends of Tomorrow, Black Lightning, and Batwoman. All series in total amount to 699 episodes across 37 seasons of television.

Overview of Arrowverse TV series
Series	Season	Episodes	Originally released		Showrunner(s)
Series	Season	Episodes	First released	Last released	Showrunner(s)
Arrow	1	23	October 10, 2012	May 15, 2013	Greg Berlanti, Andrew Kreisberg and Marc Guggenheim
Arrow	2	23	October 9, 2013	May 14, 2014	Greg Berlanti, Andrew Kreisberg and Marc Guggenheim
Arrow	3	23	October 8, 2014	May 13, 2015	Marc Guggenheim
Arrow	4	23	October 7, 2015	May 25, 2016	Wendy Mericle and Marc Guggenheim
Arrow	5	23	October 5, 2016	May 24, 2017	Wendy Mericle and Marc Guggenheim
Arrow	6	23	October 12, 2017	May 17, 2018	Wendy Mericle and Marc Guggenheim
Arrow	7	22	October 15, 2018	May 13, 2019	Beth Schwartz
Arrow	8	10	October 15, 2019	January 28, 2020	Marc Guggenheim and Beth Schwartz
The Flash	1	23	October 7, 2014	May 19, 2015	Andrew Kreisberg
The Flash	2	23	October 6, 2015	May 24, 2016	Andrew Kreisberg, Gabrielle Stanton, and Aaron and Todd Helbing
The Flash	3	23	October 4, 2016	May 23, 2017	Andrew Kreisberg, and Aaron and Todd Helbing
The Flash	4	23	October 10, 2017	May 22, 2018	Andrew Kreisberg and Todd Helbing
The Flash	5	22	October 9, 2018	May 14, 2019	Todd Helbing
The Flash	6	19	October 8, 2019	May 12, 2020	Eric Wallace
The Flash	7	18	March 2, 2021	July 20, 2021	Eric Wallace
The Flash	8	20	November 16, 2021	June 29, 2022	Eric Wallace
The Flash	9	13	February 8, 2023	May 24, 2023	Eric Wallace
Supergirl	1	20	October 26, 2015	April 18, 2016	Greg Berlanti, Ali Adler, Sarah Schechter and Andrew Kreisberg
Supergirl	2	22	October 10, 2016	May 22, 2017	Greg Berlanti, Ali Adler, Sarah Schechter and Andrew Kreisberg
Supergirl	3	23	October 9, 2017	June 18, 2018	Andrew Kreisberg, Jessica Queller and Robert Rovner
Supergirl	4	22	October 14, 2018	May 19, 2019	Jessica Queller and Robert Rovner
Supergirl	5	19	October 6, 2019	May 17, 2020	Jessica Queller and Robert Rovner
Supergirl	6	20	March 30, 2021	November 9, 2021	Jessica Queller and Robert Rovner
Legends of Tomorrow	1	16	January 21, 2016	May 19, 2016	Phil Klemmer and Chris Fedak
Legends of Tomorrow	2	17	October 13, 2016	April 4, 2017	Phil Klemmer and Chris Fedak
Legends of Tomorrow	3	18	October 10, 2017	April 9, 2018	Phil Klemmer and Marc Guggenheim
Legends of Tomorrow	4	16	October 22, 2018	May 20, 2019	Phil Klemmer and Keto Shimizu
Legends of Tomorrow	5	14 (+1) (Note: A total of 15 episodes were produced: a special episode for the "Crisis on Infinite Earths" crossover, which aired on January 14, 2020, before the fifth season, and 14 contributing towards the regular season, which officially premiered later on January 21, 2020. See List of Legends of Tomorrow episodes § Series overview and Legends of Tomorrow season 5 § Release for further information.)	January 21, 2020	June 2, 2020	Phil Klemmer and Keto Shimizu
Legends of Tomorrow	6	15	May 2, 2021	September 5, 2021	Phil Klemmer and Keto Shimizu
Legends of Tomorrow	7	13	October 13, 2021	March 2, 2022	Phil Klemmer and Keto Shimizu
Black Lightning	1	13	January 16, 2018	April 17, 2018	Salim Akil
Black Lightning	2	16	October 9, 2018	March 18, 2019	Salim Akil
Black Lightning	3	16	October 7, 2019	March 9, 2020	Salim Akil
Black Lightning	4	13	February 8, 2021	May 24, 2021	Salim Akil
Batwoman	1	20	October 6, 2019	May 17, 2020	Caroline Dries
Batwoman	2	18	January 17, 2021	June 27, 2021	Caroline Dries
Batwoman	3	13	October 13, 2021	March 2, 2022	Caroline Dries

=== Arrow (2012–2020) ===
Billionaire playboy Oliver Queen returns home after being stranded on a deserted island for five years. Upon his return to Starling City, Oliver rekindles his relationships and spends his nights hunting down wealthy criminals as a hooded vigilante known as the Green Arrow.

=== The Flash (2014–2023) ===
Crime-scene investigator Barry Allen awakens from a nine-month coma after being struck by lightning due to the S.T.A.R. Labs' particle accelerator explosion and finds himself with superhuman speed. Barry vows to use his new powers to protect Central City as the Flash, a masked superhero, while he pursues his mother's murderer, the Reverse-Flash.

=== Supergirl (2015–2021) ===
Kara Zor-El, who was sent to Earth from Krypton as a 13-year-old and taken in by the Danvers family, must learn to embrace her powers after previously hiding them. After an unexpected disaster, Kara is forced to reveal her powers, and becomes National City's protector.

=== Legends of Tomorrow (2016–2022) ===
Rip Hunter travels back in time to the present day where he brings together a team of heroes and villains in an attempt to prevent Vandal Savage from destroying the world and time itself.

=== Black Lightning (2018–2021) ===
High school principal Jefferson Pierce / Black Lightning, who retired from his superhero persona Black Lightning nine years ago after seeing the effects it had on his family, is forced to become a vigilante again when the rise of the local gang called The 100 led by Tobias Whale leads to increased crime and corruption in his community of Freeland.

=== Batwoman (2019–2022) ===
After the disappearance of Batman, Kate Kane must overcome her own demons before being able to protect the streets of Gotham as Batwoman and becoming their symbol of hope. From the second season onward, after Kate's plane mysteriously crashes and she is believed to be dead, Ryan Wilder takes up the mantle of Batwoman.

== Web series ==
Two television series make up the Arrowverse web series franchise: Vixen, and Freedom Fighters: The Ray. All series in total amount to 24 episodes across four seasons of television.

Overview of web series set in the Arrowverse
Series	Season	Episodes	Originally released		Showrunner(s)
Series	Season	Episodes	First released	Last released	Showrunner(s)
Vixen	1	6	August 25, 2015	September 29, 2015	Greg Berlanti, Marc Guggenheim and Andrew Kreisberg
Vixen	2	6	October 13, 2016	November 18, 2016	Greg Berlanti, Marc Guggenheim and Andrew Kreisberg
Freedom Fighters: The Ray	1	6	December 8, 2017		Greg Berlanti and Marc Guggenheim
Freedom Fighters: The Ray	2	6 (Note: Although marketed as a six-episode second season, it was only made available as a single 30-minute special.)	July 18, 2018		Greg Berlanti and Marc Guggenheim

=== Vixen (2015–2016) ===
After her parents were killed in Africa by local corruption, Mari McCabe inherits her family's Tantu Totem, gaining the powers of animals, using them to fight as Vixen to stop threats like those that claimed her family.

=== Freedom Fighters: The Ray (2017–2018) ===
Raymond "Ray" Terrill is a reporter who gains light-based powers after being exposed to a genetic light bomb. Ray discovers the bomb in his investigation of a secret government project attempting to harness the power of light and weaponize it. The Ray is a member of the Freedom Fighters on Earth-X, a world in the multiverse where the Nazis won World War II.

== Recurring cast and characters ==
List indicators

This section includes characters who will appear or have appeared in at least two series and as a member of the principal cast for at least one of those, or appearing across at least three series.

- ^{V} indicates a voice-only role.
- A green cell indicates the actor is a main cast member.
- A red cell indicates the actor is a recurring cast member.
- A light blue cell indicates the actor is a guest or special guest cast member.
- A number beside a character's name indicates the character is from that alternate world (i.e. a ^{2} indicates a character from Earth-2).

Cast and characters of Arrowverse series
Character	Cast member	Television series						Web series	
Character	Cast member	Arrow	The Flash	Supergirl	Legends of Tomorrow	Black Lightning	Batwoman	Vixen	Freedom Fighters: The Ray
Barry Allen The Flash	Grant Gustin	Recurring	Main	Guest	Guest		Guest	Recurring^{V}	
Barry Allen The Flash	Scott Whyte								Recurring^{V} (Note: Whyte voices Blitzkrieg, an alternate version of the Earth-1 Flash.)
John Constantine (Note: Ryan previously appeared as the character in the NBC series Constantine. The Arrowverse version of the character is the same that had appeared in the NBC series.)	Matt Ryan	Guest	Guest		Main		Guest		
Alex Danvers^{38}	Chyler Leigh	Guest	Guest	Main	Guest				
Kara Danvers^{38} Supergirl	Melissa Benoist	Guest	Guest	Main	Guest		Guest		Recurring^{V} (Note: Benoist voices Overgirl, an alternate version of the Earth-38 Supergirl.)
Damien Darhk	Neal McDonough	Recurring	Guest		Recurring				
Eleanor "Nora" Darhk	Courtney Ford		Guest		Main				
Eleanor "Nora" Darhk	Tuesday Hofmann	Guest (Note: Hofmann played young Nora.)							
John Diggle Spartan	David Ramsey	Main	Recurring	Guest	Guest		Guest		
Dinah Drake Black Canary	Juliana Harkavy	Main	Guest		Guest				
Gideon	Amy Pemberton	Guest^{V}			Main				
Gideon	Morena Baccarin		Recurring^{V}						
Gary Green	Adam Tsekhman			Guest	Main				
Carter Hall Hawkman	Falk Hentschel	Guest	Guest		Main				
Nate Heywood Steel	Nick Zano	Guest			Main				
Cecile Horton Virtue	Danielle Nicolet		Main	Guest					
Curtis Holt Mister Terrific	Echo Kellum	Main			Guest				Guest^{V}
Jefferson Jackson Firestorm	Franz Drameh	Guest	Guest	Guest	Main			Guest^{V}	
J'onn J'onzz^{38} Martian Manhunter	David Harewood	Guest	Guest	Main	Guest				
Kate Kane Batwoman	Ruby Rose	Guest	Guest	Guest	Guest		Main		
Kate Kane Batwoman	Wallis Day						Recurring		
Clark Kent Superman^{38}	Tyler Hoechlin	Guest	Guest	Recurring	Guest		Guest		
Laurel Lance Black Canary	Katie Cassidy	Main	Guest		Guest			Recurring^{V}	
Laurel Lance^{2} Black Siren / Black Canary	Katie Cassidy	Main	Guest						
Quentin Lance	Paul Blackthorne	Main	Guest		Guest				
Sara Lance White Canary	Caity Lotz	Recurring	Guest	Guest	Main		Guest		
Lois Lane^{38}	Elizabeth Tulloch	Guest	Guest	Guest	Guest		Guest		
Lex Luthor^{38}	Jon Cryer	Guest	Guest	Recurring	Guest		Guest		
Mari McCabe Vixen	Megalyn Echikunwoke	Guest						Main^{V}	Guest^{V}
Malcolm Merlyn Dark Archer	John Barrowman	Main	Guest		Recurring				
Lyla Michaels Harbinger	Audrey Marie Anderson	Recurring	Recurring	Guest	Guest		Guest		
Mon-El^{38}	Chris Wood		Guest	Main					
Nia Nal Dreamer^{38}	Nicole Maines		Guest	Main	Guest				
Mar Novu Monitor	LaMonica Garrett	Main (Note: Garrett is credited as a series regular in The Flash, Arrow, Supergirl, Batwoman and Legends of Tomorrow during the 2019–2020 season, although he is only credited in the episodes which he appears.)	Main	Main	Main		Main		
Mobius Anti-Monitor	LaMonica Garrett	Main	Main	Main	Main		Main		
Ray Palmer Atom	Brandon Routh	Recurring	Guest	Guest	Main		Guest	Recurring^{V}	
Jefferson Pierce Black Lightning	Cress Williams		Guest		Guest	Main			
Oliver Queen Green Arrow	Stephen Amell	Main	Recurring	Guest	Recurring		Guest	Recurring^{V}	
Oliver Queen Green Arrow	Matthew Mercer								Recurring^{V} (Note: Mercer voices Black Arrow, an alternate version of the Earth-1 Green Arrow.)
Thea Queen Speedy	Willa Holland	Main	Guest						
Cisco Ramon Vibe	Carlos Valdes	Recurring	Main	Guest	Guest			Recurring^{V}	Guest^{V}
Rene Ramirez Wild Dog	Rick Gonzalez	Main			Guest				
Mick Rory Heat Wave	Dominic Purcell	Guest	Recurring	Guest	Main		Guest		
Kendra Saunders Hawkgirl	Ciara Renée	Guest	Recurring		Main				
Felicity Smoak Overwatch	Emily Bett Rickards	Main	Recurring	Guest	Guest			Recurring^{V}	
Mia Smoak Blackstar / Green Arrow	Katherine McNamara	Main	Guest	Guest			Guest		
Leonard Snart Captain Cold	Wentworth Miller		Recurring		Main		Guest ^{V}		
Caitlin Snow Frost	Danielle Panabaker	Recurring	Main	Guest	Guest				Guest^{V}
Martin Stein Firestorm	Victor Garber	Guest	Recurring	Guest	Main			Guest^{V}	
Ray Terrill The Ray	Russell Tovey		Guest	Guest	Guest				Main^{V}
Eve Teschmacher^{38}	Andrea Brooks		Guest	Main					
Eobard Thawne Reverse-Flash (Note: Tom Cavanagh portrays Eobard Thawne, in the form of Harrison Wells, on The Flash as well as in the crossover events "Crisis on Earth-X" and "Elseworlds".)	Tom Cavanagh	Recurring	Main	Guest	Guest				
Eobard Thawne Reverse-Flash	Matt Letscher		Recurring		Main				
Harrison Wells (Note: Tom Cavanagh has portrayed several different versions of Harrison Wells from across the multiverse, notably "Harry" Wells from Earth-2, "H.R." Wells from Earth-19, Harrison Sherloque Wells from Earth-221 and Harrison Nash Wells from an unknown Earth in addition to portraying Eobard Thawne in the form of Earth-1's deceased Harrison Wells.)	Tom Cavanagh	Guest	Main	Guest	Guest				
Iris West-Allen	Candice Patton	Guest	Main	Guest	Guest		Guest		
Nora West-Allen XS	Jessica Parker Kennedy		Main	Guest					
Joe West	Jesse L. Martin		Main	Guest					
Wally West Kid Flash	Keiynan Lonsdale		Main	Guest	Main				
Ryan Wilder Batwoman	Javicia Leslie		Guest				Main		

After Miller's exit as a series regular during Legends of Tomorrow's first season, it was revealed he signed a deal with Warner Bros. to become a series regular across any of the shows in the Arrowverse. The deal was initially focused on Miller and his characters of Leonard and Leo Snart appearing on The Flash and Legends of Tomorrow. Berlanti stated that Miller's deal was "the first contract not applicable to just one show," adding "In success we hope to continue with other characters finding their way across all the shows." Barrowman signed a similar deal to Miller in July 2016, allowing him to continue being a series regular on Arrow as well as The Flash and Legends of Tomorrow, followed by Cassidy for her character Laurel Lance.

== Expanded setting ==
=== Official crossover events ===
List indicators

- A grey cell indicates the series was not a part of the crossover event.
- The number in parentheses next to the episode title indicates which part of the crossover it is, if not clear otherwise.

Arrowverse crossover events
TV season	Crossover title	Episodes					Ref.
TV season	Crossover title	Arrow	The Flash	Supergirl	Legends of Tomorrow	Batwoman	Ref.
2014–15	"Flash vs. Arrow"	Season 3, Episode 8 "The Brave and the Bold" (2)	Season 1, Episode 8 "Flash vs. Arrow" (1)				
2014–15	"Flash vs. Arrow"	In Central City, a metahuman who uses people's emotions to rob banks turns the Flash against the Arrow. Then, in Starling City, the two heroes face off against Captain Boomerang.					
2015–16	"Heroes Join Forces"	Season 4, Episode 8 "Legends of Yesterday" (2)	Season 2, Episode 8 "Legends of Today" (1)				
2015–16	"Heroes Join Forces"	The Flash and the Green Arrow team up to take on Vandal Savage, who is looking for Kendra Saunders and Carter Hall, the reincarnations of Hawkgirl and Hawkman. Legends of Tomorrow, in particular the main plot of its first season, is set up during the events of this crossover.					
2015–16	"Worlds Finest"			Season 1, Episode 18 "Worlds Finest"			
2015–16	"Worlds Finest"	The Flash passes through an extradimensional breach while testing a tachyon accelerator, entering the universe of Supergirl and Superman. He teams up with Supergirl in order to take down Livewire and Silver Banshee, after which Supergirl assists him in returning to his universe. While not officially part of the crossover, "Versus Zoom", the eighteenth episode of the second season of The Flash, featured Barry entering and exiting the breach to Earth-38 between two moments.					
2016–17	"Invasion!"	Season 5, Episode 8 "Invasion!" (2)	Season 3, Episode 8 "Invasion!" (1)		Season 2, Episode 7 "Invasion!" (3)		
2016–17	"Invasion!"	The Flash recruits Supergirl from Earth-38, the Green Arrow, and the Legends of Tomorrow to help him face off against a race of alien invaders called the Dominators. Though Supergirl does not have a participating "Invasion!" episode, the end of the Supergirl episode "Medusa", with Barry and Cisco recruiting her from her universe, is considered the beginning of the crossover, resulting in her appearing in the other series' episodes.					
2016–17	"Duet"		Season 3, Episode 17 "Duet"				
2016–17	"Duet"	A musical crossover between The Flash and Supergirl, where the Flash and Supergirl face the Music Meister. The end of the Supergirl episode "Star-Crossed" began the musical crossover that primarily occurs during "Duet".					
2017–18	"Crisis on Earth-X"	Season 6, Episode 8 "Crisis on Earth-X, Part 2"	Season 4, Episode 8 "Crisis on Earth-X, Part 3"	Season 3, Episode 8 "Crisis on Earth-X, Part 1"	Season 3, Episode 8 "Crisis on Earth-X, Part 4"		
2017–18	"Crisis on Earth-X"	Barry and Iris' friends come to Central City to attend their wedding, only for the event to be disrupted by Nazis from Earth-X led by their versions of Oliver and Kara who are joined by Eobard Thawne. Though Freedom Fighters: The Ray does not have a participating "Crisis on Earth-X" episode, the series further explores The Ray, Earth-X, and other characters and concepts seen in the crossover.					
2018–19	"Elseworlds"	Season 7, Episode 9 "Elseworlds, Part 2"	Season 5, Episode 9 "Elseworlds, Part 1"	Season 4, Episode 9 "Elseworlds, Part 3"			
2018–19	"Elseworlds"	The Monitor tests Earths across the Multiverse to prepare for a coming crisis; he gives Arkham Asylum doctor John Deegan the ability to rewrite reality on Earth-1, which results in Oliver and Barry swapping lives and abilities. Recruiting Kara, who is unaffected on Earth-38, they go to Gotham City to confront Deegan, receiving help from Kate Kane / Batwoman. The characters Nora Fries, Lois Lane and Psycho-Pirate are introduced to the Arrowverse in the crossover, which also features the return of Tyler Hoechlin as Superman and John Wesley Shipp as an alternate Barry Allen / The Flash.					
2019–20	"Crisis on Infinite Earths"	Season 8, Episode 8 "Crisis on Infinite Earths: Part Four"	Season 6, Episode 9 "Crisis on Infinite Earths: Part Three"	Season 5, Episode 9 "Crisis on Infinite Earths: Part One"	Season 5, special episode "Crisis on Infinite Earths: Part Five"	Season 1, Episode 9 "Crisis on Infinite Earths: Part Two"	
2019–20	"Crisis on Infinite Earths"	Continuing from the "Elseworlds" crossover, the Monitor gathers seven "Paragons" from throughout the multiverse to stop the Anti-Monitor from destroying all of reality. The five-hour event spanned two months instead of airing on consecutive nights as per previous crossovers, with three episodes airing in December 2019 and two in January 2020. The event retroactively incorporates characters from various DC films and television series into the Arrowverse multiverse, along with actors reprising Arrowverse roles such as Hoechlin and Shipp once again appearing as Superman and an alternate Barry Allen / Flash. Kevin Conroy appears as an aged Bruce Wayne, portraying the character for the first time in live action after previously voicing him in various media, and Osric Chau was introduced as Ryan Choi.					
2021–22	"Armageddon"		Season 8, Episodes 1–5 "Armageddon, Part 1"–"Part 5"				
2021–22	"Armageddon"	A powerful alien threat pushes Barry Allen and team Flash to their limits, requiring the help from their allies to save the world. The event occurred throughout the first five episodes of the eighth season of The Flash, and saw multiple Arrowverse actors reprising their roles, including Javicia Leslie as Ryan Wilder / Batwoman, Brandon Routh as Ray Palmer / the Atom, Cress Williams as Jefferson Pierce / Black Lightning, Chyler Leigh as Alex Danvers / Sentinel, Katherine McNamara as Mia Queen / Green Arrow, Osric Chau as Ryan Choi, Tom Cavanagh as Eobard Thawne / Reverse-Flash, Neal McDonough as Damien Darhk, and Courtney Ford as Nora Darhk.					
2022–23	"It's My Party and I'll Die If I Want To"		Season 9, Episode 9 "It's My Party and I'll Die If I Want To"				
2022–23	"It's My Party and I'll Die If I Want To"	Ramsey Rosso crashes Barry's birthday party and reveals his plans to spread his dark matter infection throughout the newly recreated multiverse, prompting Barry to seek out the help of Oliver, Diggle and Wally to stop him. This episode features the return of Stephen Amell as Oliver Queen / Green Arrow, David Ramsey as John Diggle / Spartan, and Keiynan Lonsdale as Wally West / Kid Flash.					

Yearly crossover events in the Arrowverse began in the 2013–14 television season, when Barry Allen was introduced in the eighth episode of Arrow's second season ahead of the debut of The Flash. The next year, the eighth episodes of the third season of Arrow and the first season of The Flash formed a two-part event known as "Flash vs. Arrow". In January 2015, The CW president Mark Pedowitz said that there would be an Arrowverse crossover every season. In the 2015–16 television season, a two-part event, "Heroes Join Forces" between the eighth episodes of the fourth season of Arrow and the second season of The Flash was used to set up a new team-up series, Legends of Tomorrow. For the 2016–17 television season, the "Invasion!" crossover included The Flash, Arrow, and Legends of Tomorrow, with the event beginning at the end of Supergirl. A true four-part crossover occurred in the 2017–18 television season with "Crisis on Earth-X", which also tied into the animated web series, Freedom Fighters: The Ray, and featured characters and concepts from that series. The 2018–19 crossover, "Elseworlds", included Supergirl, The Flash, and Arrow and saw the introduction of Batwoman ahead of her debut in her own series. At the end of "Elseworlds", it was revealed that the 2019–20 television season crossover would be "Crisis on Infinite Earths", a five-part crossover with episodes of Supergirl, Batwoman, The Flash, Arrow, and Legends of Tomorrow.

Additional crossovers include "Worlds Finest", an episode which sees Barry Allen travel to Supergirl's Earth for the first time, and "Duet", a musical crossover with The Flash and Supergirl. For the 2021–22 season, the eighth season of The Flash began with a five-episode event known as "Armageddon" that featured additional heroes and actors from other Arrowverse series. Pedowitz said the episodes would "not quite be a crossover, but it will have a crossover-type feel". The Flash showrunner Eric Wallace noted that these event episodes were meant to be a temporary replacement for the yearly crossovers because of the various COVID-19 production protocols, saying, "we want to deliver the same feeling to the audience [with the event episodes] that you would get with a crossover kind of story".

In 2022, the comic book crossover event series Earth-Prime was released. The six-issue event features five issues focusing on each current series (Batwoman, Superman & Lois, Legends of Tomorrow, Stargirl, and The Flash, respectively) with the sixth issue being a crossover between the series. Actors, writers, and executives from each of the series were involved in their creations, with the stories approved by the producers and considered in-canon to the series. The Batwoman issue, released on April 5, was written by show writers Natalie Abrams and Kelly Larson, and actor Camrus Johnson, with art by Clayton Henry. The Superman & Lois issue, released on April 19, was written by show writers Adam Mallinger, Jai Jamison, and Andrew Wong, with art by Tom Grummett and Norm Rapmund. The Legends of Tomorrow issue, released on May 3, was written by show writers Lauren Fields and Daniel Park, with art by Paul Pelletier and Andrew Hennessy. The Stargirl issue, released on May 17, was written by show writers James Robinson and Paula Sevenbergen, with art by Jerry Ordway.

==== "Crisis on Infinite Earths" crossovers ====
The 2019 crossover event "Crisis on Infinite Earths" incorporated several DC Entertainment properties into the Arrowverse multiverse, including those that had already been established in previous series and crossovers. The new properties that appeared in "Crisis on Infinite Earths" included:

- Batman (1966–1968 television series): Burt Ward reprises his role as an aged Dick Grayson. This reality is designated Earth-66 in the pre-Crisis multiverse.
- Batman (1989 film): Robert Wuhl reprises his role as Alexander Knox. This reality is designated Earth-89 in the pre-Crisis multiverse.
- Smallville (2001–2011 television series): Tom Welling and Erica Durance reprise their roles as Clark Kent and Lois Lane, respectively. This reality is designated Earth-167 in both the pre- and post-Crisis multiverse.
- Birds of Prey (2002–2003 television series): Ashley Scott and Dina Meyer reprise their roles as Helena Kyle / Huntress and Barbara Gordon / Oracle, respectively. This reality is designated Earth-203 in the pre-Crisis multiverse.
- Superman Returns (2006 film): Brandon Routh reprises his role as Kal-El / Clark Kent / Superman, albeit as an aged incarnation inspired by the Kingdom Come comic story. This reality is designated Earth-96 in both the pre- and post-Crisis multiverse.
- Green Lantern (2011 film): This reality is designated Earth-12 in the post-Crisis multiverse.
- DC Extended Universe (2013–2023 film franchise): Ezra Miller reprises their role as Barry Allen, though his universe was left undesignated.
- Lucifer (2016–2021 television series): Tom Ellis reprises his role as Lucifer Morningstar. This reality is designated Earth-666 in the pre-Crisis multiverse.
- Titans (2018–2023 television series): Alan Ritchson, Curran Walters, Teagan Croft, Minka Kelly, and Anna Diop appear in their roles as Henry "Hank" Hall / Hawk, Jason Todd / Robin, Rachel Roth, Dawn Granger / Dove, and Koriand'r / Kory Anders / Starfire, respectively, from archive footage. This reality is designated Earth-9 in both the pre- and post-Crisis multiverse.
- Swamp Thing (2019 television series): Derek Mears appears in his role as Alec Holland / Swamp Thing. This reality is designated Earth-19 in the post-Crisis multiverse.
- Doom Patrol (2019–2023 television series): April Bowlby, Diane Guerrero, Joivan Wade, Riley Shanahan, and Matthew Zuk appear in their roles as Rita Farr, Jane, Victor "Vic" Stone / Cyborg, Cliff Steele, and Larry Trainor, respectively from archive footage. This reality is designated Earth-21 in the post-Crisis multiverse.
- Stargirl (2020–2022 television series): Brec Bassinger debuted as Courtney Whitmore / Stargirl, alongside Yvette Monreal as Yolanda Montez / Wildcat, Anjelika Washington as Beth Chapel / Doctor Mid-Nite, and Cameron Gellman as Rick Tyler / Hourman from footage from Stargirl. This reality is designated Earth-2 in the post-Crisis multiverse.

==== 2021 crossovers ====
===== Planned =====
By November 2019, Guggenheim, Berlanti, and Pedowitz had discussed what a 2020 crossover would entail, with Guggenheim revealing in January 2020, that a general idea had been approved by Pedowitz and Berlanti. Guggenheim confirmed they had "no intention of trying something [as] ambitious" as the previous year's "Crisis on Infinite Earths", hoping "to really go back to the basics". He felt a crossover like "Crisis on Infinite Earths" was something "you've got to build to" and the goal of the next crossover was to "return to the roots" of the Arrowverse crossovers. In May 2020, Pedowitz revealed the crossover would be two hours, occurring on episodes of Batwoman and Superman & Lois, with an expected air date in Q1/Q2 of 2021. Pedowitz added that the event would also see other Arrowverse characters appear. Batwoman showrunner Caroline Dries was excited to integrate more of the Batwoman characters in this crossover after she "was really protective of them in 'Crisis' because it was like blowing open a whole genre world to our characters, but now people are a little bit more integrated" to the larger Arrowverse. In August 2020, Berlanti reiterated that "aspirations aren't quite as large" for the crossover, particularly with the COVID-19 pandemic necessitating additional safety precautions and guidelines for filming. However, by January 2021, the crossover was no longer moving forward because of the pandemic, with Dries explaining they could not have the crews of each series interact for fear of COVID-19 exposure.

===== John Diggle storyline =====
In December 2020, David Ramsey was revealed to be reprising his role of John Diggle on Superman & Lois, Supergirl, The Flash, and Batwoman, as well as on Legends of Tomorrow as "a historical Western character". Ramsey directed the episodes of Legends of Tomorrow and Supergirl he starred in.

According to Superman & Lois showrunner Todd Helbing, Ramsey's return was originally conceived as a five-episode story across the various series that was "pretty cool". However, because of the production difficulties that arose from the COVID-19 pandemic, his appearances were adjusted since it would have been "impossible to make it make sense", though there would still be a through-line between each appearance. The Batwoman, Flash, Superman & Lois, and Supergirl episodes explore what Diggle has been up to since the end of "Arrow" when he encountered a glowing green box. Ramsey spoke to the grounded nature of Diggle as a character, and given that, "he refused the invitation of whatever was in the box" since the last thing he would want to do is "receive an invitation from something otherworldly". However, there are consequences for Diggle with that decision. His appearance on Superman & Lois was described by Helbing as "more of a one-off" while still touching on the overall story thematically.

Ramsey appeared in "Rebirth" on Batwoman, "Stressed Western" on Legends of Tomorrow, "P.O.W." on The Flash, "Through the Valley of Death" on Superman & Lois, and "Blind Spots" on Supergirl. While in Gotham City for a neurological exam, Diggle crosses paths with Luke Fox and gives him some advice. Diggle then assists Team Flash in Central City with the war against Godspeed. Cecile Horton tells Diggle she senses pain in his head from an infinite presence, and during a fight, Diggle has a dizzy spell and collapses to the ground, hearing the repeated phrase "worlds await". He leaves Central City soon after. Finally, Diggle heads to National City to help Kelly Olsen with her decision to become the new Guardian, telling her he had an opportunity to become a special kind of hero and turned it down. The storyline was concluded in 2022 in The Flash's season 8 episode "The Man in the Yellow Tie". After the revelation that Superman & Lois is set in an adjacent universe, the Diggle appearing in that series was confirmed to be an alternate version of the Arrowverse character. In the Superman & Lois episode, Diggle is seen in Smallville aiding Superman and Lois Lane.

=== Multiverse ===
In October 2014, Johns explained that DC's approach to their films and television series would be different from Marvel Studios' cinematic universe, stating that their film universe and TV universes would be kept separate within a multiverse to allow "everyone to make the best possible product, to tell the best story, to do the best world." The second season of The Flash began to explore this concept of the multiverse, by introducing Earth-2, which features doppelgängers of the inhabitants of Earth-1. Supergirl was confirmed as an alternate universe, later designated Earth-38, with The Flash crossover episode "Worlds Finest" (2016). Freedom Fighters: The Ray is set on Earth-X.

The 2019 crossover event "Crisis on Infinite Earths", inspired by the comic of the same name, destroyed all of the universes within the Arrowverse multiverse, both on- and off-screen. At the time, the highest-numbered universe to be referenced was Earth-898, (later 1938) though the multiverse contained an infinite number of universes. The end of "Crisis on Infinite Earths" saw the creation of a new multiverse, most notably the new Earth-Prime, a world featuring inhabitants from the pre-Crisis Earth-1, Earth-38, and Black Lightning's Earth, combining all of the CW series at the time and moving forward with all of them on one fictional earth. Six additional Earths within this new multiverse were revealed in the crossover.

Ezra Miller's cameo as Barry Allen from the DC Extended Universe (DCEU) in "Crisis on Infinite Earths" opened up more possibilities for crossovers between the DC films and Arrowverse. DC Films president Walter Hamada revealed prior to "Crisis", DC had been structured in a way that the television division had to clear the use of characters with the film division. Now, the company could "really lean into this idea of [the multiverse] and acknowledge the fact there can be a Flash on TV and one in the movies, and you don't have to pick one or the other, and they both exist in this multiverse." Berlanti agreed, feeling that "moving forward, there's more opportunity to do more things like this". In February 2021, Casey Bloys, chief content officer for HBO and HBO Max, indicated that DC and WarnerMedia were working to ensure the creative decisions for their shows on HBO Max and The CW, as well as their films, were aware of each other "so that there's nobody overlapping" and everything worked to make sense together. Bloys added everything would exist in a larger multiverse. Andy Muschietti, director of The Flash (2023), revealed that Gustin had been considered to make a cameo appearance in the film, but was ultimately cut.

=== The Flash (1990–1991) ===
In The Flash episode "Welcome to Earth-2" (2016), glimpses of the multiverse are seen, including an image of John Wesley Shipp as the Flash from the 1990 television series, implying that the series exists on an alternate Earth within the Arrowverse multiverse; Shipp reprised his role as Barry Allen / The Flash from the 1990 series in the annual crossover events "Elseworlds" (2018), and "Crisis on Infinite Earths" (2019). His native universe was designated Earth-90 in the pre-Crisis multiverse.

=== Constantine (2014–2015) ===
By May 2015, Amell had had discussions with DC Entertainment about portraying Queen on NBC's Constantine, starring Matt Ryan; saying, "The reason that I was going to guest star on Constantine...was [Constantine's] an expert when it comes to the Lazarus Pit, which is now something that is a part of and will continue to be a part of Arrow." Amell stated that, even though Constantine was not renewed for a second season, a crossover "was and is still on the table". Guggenheim revealed a desire to integrate John Constantine into the Arrowverse, saying, "A lot of the pieces are in place, except for that one final piece, which is what's the fate of Constantine? That's the tricky thing. But it comes up in the writers' room constantly—we have a number of ideas, one idea that's particularly exciting to me. We're in a little bit of a wait-and-see mode". In July 2015, Mericle added on the subject, "It's something we've been talking to DC about and it's just a question of some political things, but also [Ryan]'s schedule."

In August 2015, it was confirmed that Ryan would appear in Arrow's fourth-season episode "Haunted" for a "one-time-only-deal". Guggenheim said, "This is something the fans were clamoring for," praising DC for being so "magnanimous and generous in giving us this one-time dispensation." Due to Arrow and Constantine sharing the same studio, the producers of Arrow were able to use Ryan's original outfits: "The trench coat, the tie, the shirt...the whole wardrobe is being taken out for [sic] storage and shipped up to Vancouver [where Arrow shoots]." John Badham, a director on Constantine, directed the episode that Constantine appears in. Mericle confirmed that this version of Constantine would be the same character that had appeared in Constantine. On filming the episode, Guggenheim referred to it as "a Constantine / Arrow crossover" and felt that "we got the chance to extend Matt Ryan's run as Constantine by at least one more hour of television. I think you'll see he fits very neatly into our universe. It never feels forced".

In July 2017, Guggenheim indicated that "really good conversations" had taken place with Ryan to appear again in the Arrowverse, and in October 2017, it was revealed that Ryan would appear in two episodes of the third season of Legends of Tomorrow, "Beebo the God of War" and "Daddy Darhkest", with the appearance taking place chronologically after "Haunted", revisiting the setting of Arrow's fourth season and the events following that season's final episode. Klemmer described the tone of the episodes as "The Exorcist meets One Flew Over the Cuckoo's Nest". Ryan was made a series regular for the fourth season of Legends of Tomorrow.

Jesse Schedeen of IGN felt in October 2018 that none of the character's Arrowverse appearances thus far "really directly reference the events of the Constantine series, leaving it up in the air as to whether this John Constantine is the same character from that series or if Ryan is merely playing a different, very similar version of his character." In November 2018, Ryan spoke to the relationship between the character seen in the NBC series and the one seen on Legends of Tomorrow and in the Arrowverse. He said the two were the same character with "the same DNA", and likened each appearance to that of different comic book writers and artists working with the character: "He has the same outline, but he looks different. The hair is slightly different. He has a slightly different cadence sometimes. Different artists and different writers write him in different ways." Ryan also noted that while the fourth season of Legends of Tomorrow mentions the Astra storyline from the NBC series, it would not explore the Brujeria storyline, though Constantine "still carries that baggage around with him".

=== Superman & Lois (2021–2024) ===
Although Superman & Lois was initially conceived as a spin-off of Supergirl with several Arrowverse cast members reprising their roles, the series' second-season finale established it as set in an adjacent universe. Showrunner Todd Helbing explained his initial pilot script included multiple references to the Arrowverse that were later removed. Once they were, it "became a can of worms" to try to tie into the universe, with Helbing discussing with DC during the first season that the series would instead be on an alternate earth, which he could not reveal publicly until the end of the second season, which concluded in June 2022. At that time he said, "I totally understand DC's position... This wasn't meant to alienate us from the Arrowverse, but because a lot of the other shows are sadly no longer going to be on the air, it felt like the right thing to do."

== Marketing ==
In April 2015, The CW released a short promo titled "Superhero Fight Club" to celebrate the season three finale of Arrow and season one finale of The Flash. The short features characters from Arrow and The Flash battling each other in a hero vs. villain showdown. Characters include The Arrow, Flash, Arsenal, Black Canary, Dark Archer, Reverse-Flash, Captain Cold, Heat Wave, Firestorm, Ra's al Ghul, and Atom in a cage match fight, with Black Canary and Arsenal vs. Dark Archer, Arrow vs. Ra's al Ghul, Flash vs. Captain Cold and Heat Wave, which is interrupted by Reverse-Flash, until Firestorm intervenes and the Atom makes an appearance at the end. In September 2016, The CW released the promo "Superhero Fight Club 2.0" to promote the start of the 2016–17 season with the addition of Supergirl to their lineup, as well as their new mobile app, where the promo could exclusively be viewed initially. The new Superhero Fight Club sees Green Arrow, Flash, Atom, Firestorm, White Canary, and Supergirl go up against a new fight simulator created by Cisco Ramon and Felicity Smoak, while John Diggle and Martian Manhunter observe. After defeating the simulator, Cisco releases Gorilla Grodd into the arena for the heroes to face. In January 2018, The CW released the promo "Suit Up", featuring the various heroes putting on their costumes to promote the return of Arrow, The Flash, Legends of Tomorrow, and Supergirl from their first mid-season break, as well as the premiere of Black Lightning.

== Reception ==
=== Ratings ===
Viewership and ratings per season of Arrowverse series
Series	Season	Timeslot (ET)	Episodes	First aired		Last aired		Viewership rank	Avg. viewers (millions)	18–49 rank	Avg. 18–49 rating
Series	Season	Timeslot (ET)	Episodes	Date	Viewers (millions)	Date	Viewers (millions)	Viewership rank	Avg. viewers (millions)	18–49 rank	Avg. 18–49 rating
Arrow	1	Wednesday 8:00 pm	23	October 10, 2012	4.14	May 15, 2013	2.77	130	3.68	125	1.2
Arrow	2	Wednesday 8:00 pm	23	October 9, 2013	2.74	May 14, 2014	2.37	138	3.28	119	–
Arrow	3	Wednesday 8:00 pm	23	October 8, 2014	2.83	May 13, 2015	2.83	135	3.52	111	1.3
Arrow	4	Wednesday 8:00 pm	23	October 7, 2015	2.67	May 25, 2016	2.19	145	2.90	110	1.1
Arrow	5	Wednesday 8:00 pm	23	October 5, 2016	1.87	May 24, 2017	1.72	147	2.21	133	0.8
Arrow	6	Thursday 9:00 pm	23	October 12, 2017	1.52	May 17, 2018	1.35	181	1.76	163	0.6
Arrow	7	Monday 8:00 pm (1–17); Monday 9:00 pm (18–22)	22	October 15, 2018	1.43	May 13, 2019	0.95	172	1.58	147	0.5
Arrow	8	Tuesday 9:00 pm	10	October 16, 2019	0.84	January 28, 2020	0.73	120	1.52	106	0.6
The Flash	1	Tuesday 8:00 pm	23	October 7, 2014	4.83	May 19, 2015	3.87	118	4.62	90	1.7
The Flash	2	Tuesday 8:00 pm	23	October 6, 2015	3.58	May 24, 2016	3.35	112	4.25	69	1.7
The Flash	3	Tuesday 8:00 pm	23	October 4, 2016	3.17	May 23, 2017	3.04	120	3.50	78	1.4
The Flash	4	Tuesday 8:00 pm	23	October 10, 2017	2.84	May 22, 2018	2.16	151	3.04	108	1.1
The Flash	5	Tuesday 8:00 pm	22	October 9, 2018	2.08	May 14, 2019	1.53	153	2.43	102	0.9
The Flash	6	Tuesday 8:00 pm	19	October 8, 2019	1.62	May 12, 2020	1.08	113	2.23	90	0.8
The Flash	7	Tuesday 8:00 pm	18	March 2, 2021	1.00	July 20, 2021	0.70	132	1.58	108	0.5
The Flash	8	Tuesday 8:00 pm (1–5); Wednesday 8:00 pm (6–18)	20	November 16, 2021	0.75	June 29, 2022	0.56	122	1.04	111	0.3
The Flash	9	Wednesday 8:00 pm	13	February 8, 2023	0.51	May 24, 2023	0.46	114	0.86	113	0.18
Supergirl	1	Monday 8:00 pm	20	October 26, 2015	12.96	April 18, 2016	6.11	39	9.81	27	2.4
Supergirl	2	Monday 8:00 pm	22	October 10, 2016	3.06	May 22, 2017	2.12	129	3.12	115	1.0
Supergirl	3	Monday 8:00 pm	23	October 9, 2017	1.87	June 18, 2018	1.78	154	2.82	125	0.9
Supergirl	4	Sunday 8:00 pm	22	October 14, 2018	1.52	May 19, 2019	1.07	169	1.67	147	0.5
Supergirl	5	Sunday 9:00 pm	19	October 6, 2019	1.26	May 17, 2020	0.65	118	1.58	113	0.5
Supergirl	6	Tuesday 9:00 pm	20	March 30, 2021	0.73	November 9, 2021	0.49	140	1.17	133	0.3
Legends of Tomorrow	1	Thursday 8:00 pm	16	January 21, 2016	3.21	May 19, 2016	1.85	135	3.16	104	1.2
Legends of Tomorrow	2	Thursday 8:00 pm (1–8); Tuesday 9:00 pm (9–17)	17	October 13, 2016	1.82	April 4, 2017	1.52	141	2.57	127	0.9
Legends of Tomorrow	3	Tuesday 9:00 pm (1–9); Monday 8:00 pm (10–18)	18	October 10, 2017	1.71	April 9, 2018	1.41	170	2.24	137	0.8
Legends of Tomorrow	4	Monday 9:00 pm (1–8); Monday 8:00 pm (9–16)	16	October 22, 2018	1.00	May 20, 2019	1.05	178	1.49	147	0.5
Legends of Tomorrow	5	Tuesday 9:00 pm	14 (+1)	January 21, 2020	0.72	June 2, 2020	0.73	122	1.35	122	0.4
Legends of Tomorrow	6	Sunday 8:00 pm	15	May 2, 2021	0.44	September 5, 2021	0.39	149	0.82	141	0.2
Legends of Tomorrow	7	Wednesday 8:00 pm	13	October 13, 2021	0.59	March 2, 2022	0.46	127	0.86	117	0.2
Black Lightning	1	Tuesday 9:00 pm	13	January 16, 2018	2.31	April 17, 2018	1.68	160	1.74	109	1.0
Black Lightning	2	Tuesday 9:00 pm (1–9); Monday 9:00 pm (10–16)	16	October 9, 2018	1.16	March 18, 2019	0.85	179	0.97	147	0.5
Black Lightning	3	Monday 9:00 pm	16	October 7, 2019	0.89	March 9, 2020	0.55	130	1.09	122	0.4
Black Lightning	4	Monday 9:00 pm	13	February 8, 2021	0.52	May 24, 2021	0.50	151	0.74	141	0.2
Batwoman	1	Sunday 8:00 pm	20	October 6, 2019	1.86	May 17, 2020	0.74	117	1.61	113	0.5
Batwoman	2	Sunday 8:00 pm (1–11); Sunday 9:00 pm (12–18)	18	January 17, 2021	0.66	June 27, 2021	0.41	147	0.92	141	0.2
Batwoman	3	Wednesday 9:00 pm	13	October 13, 2021	0.47	March 2, 2022	0.46	129	0.76	117	0.2

=== Critical response ===
Critical response of Arrowverse series
Title	Season	Rotten Tomatoes	Metacritic
Arrow	1	85% (285 reviews)	73 (25 reviews)
Arrow	2	95% (265 reviews)	—N/a
Arrow	3	89% (365 reviews)	—N/a
Arrow	4	85% (369 reviews)	—N/a
Arrow	5	88% (193 reviews)	—N/a
Arrow	6	64% (186 reviews)	—N/a
Arrow	7	87% (213 reviews)	—N/a
Arrow	8	95% (125 reviews)	—N/a
The Flash (Note: Season 8 not visibly listed due to having less than required reviews to calculate score)	1	92% (530 reviews)	73 (27 reviews)
The Flash	2	94% (362 reviews)	81 (4 reviews)
The Flash	3	85% (272 reviews)	80 (4 reviews)
The Flash	4	80% (221 reviews)	—N/a
The Flash	5	94% (294 reviews)	—N/a
The Flash	6	85% (92 reviews)	—N/a
The Flash	7	95% (25 reviews)	—N/a
The Flash	9	60% (5 reviews)	—N/a
Supergirl	1	92% (371 reviews)	75 (33 reviews)
Supergirl	2	92% (327 reviews)	81 (4 reviews)
Supergirl	3	78% (289 reviews)	—N/a
Supergirl	4	88% (188 reviews)	—N/a
Supergirl	5	92% (111 reviews)	—N/a
Supergirl	6	88% (13 reviews)	—N/a
Legends of Tomorrow (Note: Season 7 not visibly listed due to having less than required reviews to calculate score)	1	65% (267 reviews)	58 (22 reviews)
Legends of Tomorrow	2	88% (166 reviews)	—N/a
Legends of Tomorrow	3	88% (36 reviews)	—N/a
Legends of Tomorrow	4	98% (107 reviews)	—N/a
Legends of Tomorrow	5	100% (13 reviews)	—N/a
Legends of Tomorrow	6	100% (7 reviews)	—N/a
Black Lightning (Note: Season 4 not visibly listed due to having less than required reviews to calculate score)	1	96% (194 reviews)	79 (25 reviews)
Black Lightning	2	91% (86 reviews)	—N/a
Black Lightning	3	89% (9 reviews)	—N/a
Batwoman (Note: Season 3 not visibly listed due to having less than required reviews to calculate score)	1	80% (235 reviews)	59 (16 reviews)
Batwoman	2	86% (21 reviews)	—N/a

=== Commentary ===
After the first Arrow / Flash crossover, Brian Lowry of Variety talked about the spin-off series and the crossover, applauding the producers for replicating the success of Arrow but with "a lighter tone" and "a hero with genuine super powers" in The Flash, and calling the crossover an appropriate moment for everyone concerned to take a short but well-deserved victory lap." Lowry also said that the crossover "does a nifty job of bringing the two series together, although probably not in a manner likely to boost the shared audience between them much more than already exists." Meredith Borders at Birth.Movies.Death. called the crossover episodes "fun" and said positively that "too much happened that was unrelated to one show or the other – and that's a good thing. While the crossover episodes were definitely open to new viewers of either The Flash or Arrow (or both, presumably), with each episode wrapped up tidily by the end of its hour, plenty of show-specific plot stuff was advanced without spelling it out for newbies. New viewers to either show could follow along and have a good time, but veteran viewers were rewarded with major storyline motion."

Following the release of the first trailer for Supergirl, Paul Tassi wrote for Forbes about why he felt that series should be kept separate from the Arrowverse: He called the moment in the Arrow third-season finale where Barry Allen appears briefly, but abruptly leaves since "Arrow needs to let its own characters solve its problems", a "weird moment" that shows "the cracks [that] form when it's just two shows that have to work together on the regular." Tassi then noted the further complications of adding Supergirl, saying, "The more shows you have, the more heroes you introduce, the harder it is to keep explaining away why they're not constantly around to help each other. Supergirl already has that problem built-in with Superman, who it seems will not be a regular fixture on the show, and I'm sure there will be many excuses as to why he's too busy to help Supergirl fight her latest battle. Add in Arrow, The Flash and Legends of Tomorrow mythology, and it's probably too much to juggle....I think Supergirl deserves to launch without Arrow and The Flash on its shoulders, and be allowed to find itself before being assimilated into an existing universe."

With the premiere of Legends of Tomorrow, Screen Rant's Alice Walker discussed how the series "has hurt Arrow and The Flash", noting that the latter required minimal setup when it was spun-off from the former and had an element of mystery surrounding its quality with "a "wait and see" attitude" from audiences, while Legends was instead met with much excitement long before its release leading to each piece of news concerning it being "publicized and met with fanfare – to the detriment of the other shows involved." Walker felt that audiences knowing which characters would appear in Legends, and how, took "the thrill out of the story" of the other series as such information spoiled some of their upcoming plot twists, including the resurrection of Sara Lance or the fact that Ray Palmer "could never really pose a threat to Oliver [Queen] and Felicity [Smoak]'s relationship, or run Palmer Technologies long term, since it was widely known that he would be a huge part of Legends." Additionally, the annual Arrow / The Flash crossover suffered from also trying to set up Legends, which was "too much to ask from the already crowded storylines and ended up feeling like an exercise in synchronicity, with producers planting more seeds than they could reap. The crossover event was no longer a fun way to contrast the two shows; it now had to serve the much larger purpose of setting up an entirely new world." Walker stated that the premiere of Legends "means that Arrow and The Flash can finally stop dedicating so much time and plot to laying the groundwork for the spin-off, and start focusing on the fundamentals of their own shows again."

After the conclusion of the "Elseworlds" crossover revealed that the next crossover would be an adaptation of the Crisis on Infinite Earths comic, Mike Cecchini of Den of Geek stated: "The Arrowverse is becoming the most intricate, risky live action superhero universe in history. Yes, it's at least as big and crazy (perhaps even moreso in some ways) than the Marvel Cinematic Universe, and we had best enjoy this while we have it, because it's unlikely we'll ever see this much crazy DC Comics love on screen in one place at one time ever again."

Ahead of the airing of The Flash's series finale, "A New World, Part Four", which marked the conclusion of the Arrowverse as a whole, Sam Barsanti of The A.V. Club opined: "If not for the fact that it was focused on television, the Arrowverse would be regarded as one of the only cinematic universes beyond the MCU to actually work—and if you're basing it on pure hours of content, the Arrowverse is completely unmatched. For 11 years, the Arrowverse tied together one show, then two shows, then three shows, then four, five, sometimes six, then—once the multiverse was introduced in the 'Crisis on Infinite Earths' crossover event—the entirety of all live-action DC superhero shows and movies that have ever been made."

== Other media ==
=== Comic books ===
Comic book tie-ins to the Arrowverse
Title	Issue(s)	Publication date(s)		Writer(s)	Artist(s)
Title	Issue(s)	First published	Last published	Writer(s)	Artist(s)
Arrow	13	October 10, 2012	October 23, 2013	Andrew Kreisberg (#1–8); Marc Guggenheim (#1–12, 0)	Sergio Sandoval (#1–3, 5–6, 8, 10); Jorge Jimenez (#1–3); Mike Grell (#1–4, 6, 9–10); Eric Nguyen (#4, 9); Julian Totino Tedesco (#4); Xermanico (#5–7, 10–11); Omar Francia (#5, 8, 11); Pol C Gas (#6; 8); Victor Drujiniu (#6–8, 12); Le Beau Underwood (#7, 9); Allan Jefferson (#7, 9–12); Juan Castro (#7–8, 12); Jonas Trindade (#11–12)
Arrow: Season 2.5	12	October 8, 2014	September 9, 2015	Marc Guggenheim (#1–12); Yuko Shimizu (#4); Keto Shimizu (#5)	Joe Bennett (#1–5; 7–12); Jack Jadson (#2); Craig Yeung (#3–5; 7–12); Szymon Kudranski (#4–7)
The Flash: Season Zero	12	October 1, 2014	September 2, 2015	Andrew Kreisberg (#1–10); Katherine Walczak (#4); Brooke Eikmeier (#4); Lauren Certo (#7–9); Kai Wu (#7–9); Phil Hester (#10); Ben Sokolowski (#11); Sterling Gates (#12)	Eric Gapstur and Phil Hester (#1–4; 6–11); Marcus To (#5; 10); Ibrahim Mustafa (#12)
Arrow: The Dark Archer	12	January 13, 2016	June 15, 2016	John Barrowman; Carol Barrowman; Marc Guggenheim; Andrew Kreisberg	Daniel Sampere
Adventures of Supergirl	6	May 11, 2016	July 20, 2016	Sterling Gates	Bengal (#1); Pop Mhan and Jonboy Meyers (#2); Ray McCarthy and Emanuela Lupacchino (#3); Carmen Carnero (#4); Emma Vieceli (#5–6); Cat Staggs (#5)
Crisis on Infinite Earths Giant	2	December 15, 2019	January 19, 2020	Marv Wolfman; Marc Guggenheim	Tom Derenick; Trevor Scott; John Kalisz; Andy Owens; Hi-Fi; Tom Grummett; Danny Miki; Chris Sotomayor
Earth-Prime	6	April 5, 2022	June 21, 2022	Natalie Abrams (#1); Kelley Larson (#1); Camrus Johnson (#1); Adam Mallinger (#2); Jai Jamison (#2); Andrew Wong (#2); Lauren Fields (#3); Daniel Park (#3); James Robinson (#4); Paula Sevenbergen (#4); Jess Carson (#5); Emily Palizzi (#5); Jeff Hersch (#6); Thomas Pound (#6)	Clayton Henry (#1); Tom Grummett (#2); Norm Rapmund (#2); Paul Pelletier (#3); Andrew Hennessy (#3); Jerry Ordway (#4); David Lafuente (#5); Will Robson (#6)

=== Books ===
==== Novels ====
On February 23, 2016, Titan Books released Arrow: Vengeance, a tie-in novel by Oscar Balderrama and Lauren Certo, which is set before and during Arrow's second season, which details the origins of Slade Wilson, Isabel Rochev, and Sebastian Blood, and how they would all eventually meet and collaborate with each other to battle Oliver Queen / The Arrow as seen in the TV series. On November 29, 2016, Titan released The Flash: The Haunting of Barry Allen, a tie-in novel by Susan and Clay Griffith, which is set during The Flash's second season and Arrow's fourth season, which detailed that after he closed the temporal anomaly that nearly destroyed Central City, Barry an older version of himself, beaten, injured, and batter, but before he can speak, his doppelganger disappears. Barry then starts experiencing glitches in his powers, moments that leave him immobile and ghostly during missions. When a group of his worst villains, including Pied Piper, Weather Wizard, and Peek-a-Boo, decide to launch an assault on him, so Barry decides to seek help from his most trusted ally, Oliver Queen / Green Arrow. The story continues in Arrow: A Generation of Vipers, by Susan and Clay Griffith, which was released by Titan on March 28, 2017, which detailed Team Flash and Team Arrow working together to eliminate the bizarre energy that threatens to kill the Flash. When their quest leads them to Markovia, they must get past an army of mercenaries and assassins to face the mysterious Count Wallenstein.

The fourth novel Arrow: Fatal Legacies was released in January 2018, co-authored by Arrow executive producer Marc Guggenheim and James R. Tuck, set between the fifth-season finale and sixth-season premiere of Arrow. The fifth novel The Flash: Climate Changeling, following The Flash villain Weather Wizard in his attempts at revenge, was released in May 2018, written by Richard A. Knaak.

In May 2017, it was announced that Abrams Books would be releasing two trilogies of middle-grade novels for The Flash and Supergirl, written by Barry Lyga and Jo Whittemore, respectively. The first of these novels, The Flash: Hocus Pocus, was released on October 3, 2017. The novel takes place in an alternate timeline where the show's "Flashpoint" event never occurred, and The Flash must fight a villain known as Hocus Pocus who can control the minds and actions of people. A sequel, The Flash: Johnny Quick was released on April 3, 2018, as well as a third novel titled The Flash: The Tornado Twins released on October 2, 2018.

The second of these trilogies began in November 2017, with Supergirl: Age of Atlantis. The novel features Supergirl dealing with a surge of new powered people in National City, as well as a mysterious humanoid sea creature captured by the Department of Extranormal Operations who is seemingly attracted by the new superpowered people. A sequel, Supergirl: Curse of the Ancients, was released on May 1, 2018, with a third novel, titled Supergirl: Master of Illusion, released on January 8, 2019.

In July 2017, a third trilogy titled Crossover Crisis was announced, focusing on crossovers between characters within the universe on this alternate earth. The series is again penned by Barry Lyga. The first novel, The Flash: Green Arrow's Perfect Shot, was released on August 13, 2019 with the second The Flash: Supergirl's Sacrifice released on May 26, 2020. The final novel in the series, The Flash: Legends of Forever, was published on March 23, 2021.

==== Guidebooks ====
The first guidebook to be released was Arrow: Heroes and Villains by Nick Aires and published by Titan Books, released in February 2015. Described as "a companion" to the series, the book features sections on the various characters of the series, along with descriptions, backgrounds, comic book origins, and "where they stand as of the end of the second season of 'Arrow.'"

A follow-up to Heroes and Villains by the same author and publisher, titled Arrow: Oliver Queen's Dossier, was released in October 2016, during the series' fifth season. The book is presented as information collected by the Green Arrow and Felicity Smoak over the course of his four years of activity. Included in the book are "handwritten notes" and "police reports" regarding the Green Arrow and those he targets.

In May 2018, Titan Books and Aires released a guidebook similar to Oliver Queen's Dossier, but for its sister series, The Flash, from the perspective of Cisco Ramon. S.T.A.R. Labs: Cisco Ramon's Journal features "his confidential journal entries, covering everything from his tech designs, the villains and other heroes the team encounter, the team's personal challenges and his own Vibe abilities prior to Flashpoint."

A second guidebook for The Flash was released in November 2018, this time published by Abrams Books. The Secret Files of Barry Allen: The Ultimate Guide to the Hit TV Show features the Flash's "top-secret notes", as well as "classified S.T.A.R. Labs dossiers on everyone in Central City", an episode guide on the first four seasons of the series, and details on the life of the Flash "in Barry's own words."

A similar guidebook for Supergirl was released in March 2019 from the same publisher. Supergirl: The Secret Files of Kara Danvers: The Ultimate Guide to the Hit TV Show features "detailed profiles on characters and super powers, a heroes and villains gallery, episode guide, and more" from the first three seasons of the series.

=== Promotional tie-ins ===
==== Blood Rush ====
On November 6, 2013, a six-episode series of shorts, titled Blood Rush, premiered alongside the broadcast of Arrow, as well as online. The series, which was presented by Bose, and features product placement for Bose products, was shot on location in Vancouver, similarly to the main show. The miniseries features Emily Bett Rickards, Colton Haynes and Paul Blackthorne reprising their roles of Felicity Smoak, Roy Harper and Quentin Lance, respectively. The episodes set during the course of the second season of the television series, show Roy coming to Queen Consolidated to have a meeting with Oliver. As he is out, Felicity tells Roy to go wait in the lobby. As Roy leaves, Officer Lance calls Felicity, telling her that the blood sample the Starling City police found on the vigilante, which Felicity destroyed, has resurfaced. Felicity then calls Roy, using Oliver's voice encoder, asking him to break into the lab to retrieve the sample. Felicity guides Roy through the lab, where he is able to recover the sample. As Roy is leaving, doctors enter the room, seemingly trapping him. He notifies Felicity, who then hacks into the building's PA system, and issues an evacuation notice, giving Roy a chance to escape. Roy gets out of the room before it enters into lock down, and is able to avoid two guards with the help of Felicity and exit the lab. Roy returns to Queen Consolidated, and Felicity offers to mail the acquired sample for Roy as he goes in to meet with Oliver.

==== Chronicles of Cisco: Entry 0419 ====
On April 19, 2016, a four-episode series of shorts, titled Chronicles of Cisco, premiered on AT&T. The series features Valdes and Britne Oldford reprising their roles as Cisco Ramon and Peek-a-Boo respectively. Set in the second season of the television series, the series sees Cisco attempting to make the Flash suit bulletproof and body-odor proof. While working on these, he receives a late-night Meta-Human Alert within S.T.A.R. Labs, and learns that Peek-a-Boo triggered the alert. She has come to S.T.A.R. Labs to make Cisco create a weapon for her, as he did for Golden Glider, Captain Cold, and Heat Wave. When he does not cooperate, she shoots him. Cisco survives being shot, realizing that the orange soda he spilled on his shirt was the missing catalyst to his bulletproof formula. Cisco tries to bring Peek-a-Boo back to the pipeline, but she locks him in the cell instead. Cisco is then seen being woken up due to a call from Barry. He believes he dreamt the whole experience, until he finds the bullet that shot him on the ground.

==== Stretched Scenes ====
On November 14, 2017, a three-episode series of shorts, known as "Stretched Scenes", premiered. The series, presented by Microsoft Surface, features Hartley Sawyer, Danielle Panabaker, and Candice Patton as Ralph Dibny, Cailtin Snow, and Iris West respectively. Set during the fourth season of The Flash, it shows Dibny continuously calling upon Cailtin and Iris for their help or attention. The shorts premiered online as well as during the commercial breaks of the episodes "When Harry Met Harry...", "Therefore I Am", and "Don't Run".

=== Christmas special ===
The Legends of Tomorrow toy character Beebo, voiced by Benjamin Diskin, starred in his own animated Christmas special, titled Beebo Saves Christmas and aired on December 21, 2021. Narrated by Victor Garber (who portrays Martin Stein / Firestorm in the parent series), the special sees Diskin reprising his role, alongside Ernie Hudson as Santa Claus, Chris Kattan as a Christmas elf named Sprinkles, Kimiko Glenn as Tweebo, Yvette Nicole Brown as Turbo, and Keith Ferguson as Fleabo.

== See also ==
- DC Animated Universe (1992–2006)
- DC Extended Universe (2013–2023)
- DC Animated Movie Universe (2013–2024)
- DC Universe (2024–present)
