= Marcus Stokes =

American director

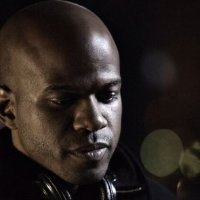
- Born: Marcus Stokes; New Haven, Connecticut
- Occupations: Director, screenwriter, producer

Marcus Stokes is an American director. Marcus began his career in film as a visual effects artist at George Lucas' Industrial Light and Magic (ILM). After his work on major films such as Star Wars: Episode I – The Phantom Menace and I, Robot, Marcus began directing with a sci-fi short that was acquired by HBO.

== Early life ==
Marcus Stokes was born in New Haven, Connecticut but raised in Macon, Georgia.

Before his career in films, Marcus worked in Architectural design and holds a master's degree from the University of California, Berkeley. Marcus also worked in rural Japan as a language instructor and translator.

== Currently ==
Marcus is the founder and president of The Working Director, a Santa Monica-based company specializing in training aspiring professional directors. Marcus' current directing projects include The Signal, starring Michael Ealy and Grace Phipps, and post-apocalyptic thriller, O2, which he is collaborating on with Cody Zwieg.

== Filmography ==
Visual Effects (17 credits) including Small Soldiers, Star Wars Episodes I & II, The Matrix Reloaded, Spider-Man 2, I Robot, and Serenity.
Director (6 credits) including shorts The Catalyst, Chains, and The Signal.
Asst Director (1 credit) on Mind Tricks.
Producer (5 credits) including the 35th and 36th NAACP Image Awards, and The Signal.
Writer (4 credits) including shorts The Catalyst, Chains, and The Signal.
