= Mister Atom =

- Mister Atom as depicted in 52 #52 (May 2007). Art by Keith Giffen.

Publication information
- Publisher: Fawcett Comics (November 1947); DC Comics (1972–present)
- First appearance: Captain Marvel Adventures #78 (November 1947)
- Created by: Otto Binder; C. C. Beck

In-story information
- Species: Robot
- Team affiliations: Secret Society of Super Villains; Monster Society of Evil
- Abilities: Superhuman strength and durability; Flight; Atomic manipulation; Genius-level intellect

Mister Atom is a supervillain appearing in American comic books published by DC Comics. He is a radioactive robot who is regularly seen as an enemy of Shazam. The character first appeared in Captain Marvel Adventures #78 in November 1947. Along with other members of Shazam's rogues' gallery, Mister Atom was recruited by Mister Mind to be part of the second Monster Society of Evil in 1973.

== Publication history ==
Mister Atom first appeared in Captain Marvel Adventures #78 and was created by Otto Binder and C. C. Beck. He was initially owned by Fawcett Comics before the company went bankrupt following a lawsuit against DC Comics, who acquired their properties.

== Fictional character biography ==
=== Golden Age ===
Mister Atom was created by Dr. Charles Langley in a story in Captain Marvel Adventures #78. His body was constructed first, and then Langley charged the robot with radioactive energy. The spark that gave the robot life also ended the life of his creator. Super-charged with a nuclear reactor and armed with a deadly mind, Atom embarks on a wave of destruction, believing he should rule the world, before being challenged to a fight to the finish by Captain Marvel as he tried to attack the United Nations building. Atom is imprisoned in an underground, lead-lined cell, as no other prison could contain his power, but he threatens to break out one day.

Mister Atom is freed by aliens called the Comet Men, who intend to employ his power in the conquest of Earth. The Comet Men begin fighting among themselves when Atom realizes they planned to destroy him; they and Atom are apparently destroyed in a giant explosion. Rather than being destroyed, Atom is transported forward in time to 2053, a future where almost everything is run by atomic power. Captain Marvel travels to this future after the wizard Shazam informs him of the danger which threatens it and battles Atom again, who threatens to destroy Earth. Atom is once again destroyed, this time in an atomic furnace.

=== Pre-Crisis ===
Mister Atom was re-introduced in 1976, by which time DC Comics had purchased the rights to use the Captain Marvel characters; Captain Marvel's enemy King Kull used his advanced scientific acumen to return Atom to the 20th century and employed his help battling Shazam's Squadron of Justice. Atom's first appearance in a DC comic was in Justice League of America #137, a crossover issue depicting Captain Marvel's first meeting with Superman. Atom attempts to wreck a futuristic city on Earth-One called Tomorrow. Destroying the city meant the three super-speedsters had to repair it, which was causing increased rotation of the Earth. Atom easily withstood the efforts of Green Lantern of Earth-Two, Green Lantern of Earth-One, Flash of Earth-Two, Flash of Earth-One, the god Mercury, and Ibis the Invincible to subdue him. When Atom attempts to use Ibis's Ibistick to send Ibis to a faraway star, he is propelled into space by a failsafe within the stick that causes any commands that would harm Ibis to backfire on the user.

Atom is returned to Earth by Mister Mind, who attaches Atom's head to an atomic racecar and challenge Captain Marvel to an auto race in Indianapolis with the threat that he would level the city with an atomic blast. When Captain Marvel wins the race and destroys Atom's car, Atom re-attaches his head to his body and attacked Marvel, who hits him hard enough to achieve escape velocity and send Atom into orbit around the Sun. Mind was meanwhile captured by Uncle Marvel using a Geiger counter. Mind retrieves Atom with help from Oggar and enlists him into the Monster Society of Evil. During the Society's assault on the Rock of Eternity, Atom is shoved off the rock into another universe where life never developed and he could do no harm.

=== Post-Crisis version ===
Two decades later, Atom was revamped by Jerry Ordway and re-introduced in The Power of Shazam! #23. His backstory is the same as his original counterpart, but he has been given a robotic design. Atom, at first not a villain, was told by Dr. Langley before he died to find a suitable woman to take care of him. Mister Atom interpreted Mary Marvel as a suitable woman and kidnapped her, until Captain Marvel found Langley's assistant to watch over the robot.

In Power of Shazam! #27, Mister Atom was controlled by Mister Mind into creating a nuclear explosion that destroyed the city of Fairview, home to the Marvels, killing thousands.

In Infinite Crisis, Mister Atom joins the Secret Society of Super Villains, but is seemingly destroyed by the Golden Age Superman, Kal-L. He does not stay down for long.

In "52", Captain Marvel mentioned that Mister Atom attacked the Rock of Eternity, only to fail. It is later revealed that Atom is one of the villains who helped Prometheus plant explosive devices in various cities across the U.S., which leads to Atom and several other villains making an attempt to flee the country. Before they can cross the border, the group is attacked by the Justice League, and Atom is defeated and captured by Starman and Congorilla.

In the "DC Rebirth" relaunch, Mister Atom originates from the Gamelands, one of the seven Magiclands. He was previously imprisoned in the Dungeon of Eternity within the Monsterlands until Mister Mind and Doctor Sivana free him and several other prisoners. When Shazam defeats Mister Mind, the resulting magical energy knocks out Atom and the rest of the Monster Society of Evil. The Society's members are remanded to Rock Falls Penitentiary, which has had a special section built to contain magical threats.

In the "Dawn of DC" initiative, several Mister Atom robots appear under the control of Charles Langley.

== Powers and abilities ==
Mister Atom has upper-level immense strength and durability. He can fly at subsonic speeds, fire nuclear blasts from his hands, and render radioactive materials inert. Due to his artificial intelligence, he possesses a gifted mind.

== In other media ==
- Mister Atom appears in The Kid Super Power Hour with Shazam! episode "Mister Atom, the Smasher", voiced by Alan Oppenheimer.
- Mister Atom appears in the Batman: The Brave and the Bold episode "The Malicious Mr. Mind!", voiced by Dee Bradley Baker.
- Mister Atom appears as a character summon in Scribblenauts Unmasked: A DC Comics Adventure.
- Mister Atom appears in Justice League Unlimited.
