= Lego DC Shazam! Magic and Monsters =

2020 animated superhero film

- Blu-ray cover
- Directed by: Matt Peters
- Written by: Jeremy Adams
- Based on: Shazam by Bill Parker and C. C. Beck
- Starring: Sean Astin; Troy Baker; Grey Griffin; Nolan North
- Music by: Tim Kelly
- Production companies: The Lego Group; DC Entertainment; Warner Bros. Animation
- Distributed by: Warner Bros. Home Entertainment
- Release dates: April 28, 2020 (Digital); June 16, 2020 (DVD and Blu-ray)
- Running time: 81 minutes
- Country: United States
- Language: English

Lego DC Shazam! Magic and Monsters is a 2020 American animated superhero comedy film based on the DC Comics and Lego brands. The film is produced by DC Entertainment, The Lego Group and Warner Bros. Animation and distributed by Warner Bros. Home Entertainment. It is the tenth and final Lego DC Comics film and was released on digital on April 28, and on Blu-ray and DVD on June 16, 2020. It is also the final direct-to-video Lego film from Warner Bros. as The Lego Group would end their deal with them and sign a new deal with Universal Pictures. The film received positive reviews from critics, with praise for the humor and action.

== Plot ==
The hero Shazam makes his public debut and attracts media attention for his polite disposition. Privately, Shazam is a young orphan boy named Billy Batson. Shazam helps Superman and the Justice League stop Mister Mind and the Monster Society of Evil. Impressed, the Justice League invites Shazam to join them. However, Shazam declines, worried they will reject him if they discover his actual age. He goes to the Rock of Eternity to consult The Wizard, who advises Shazam to be more open with the League. Sensing a disturbance, The Wizard sends Shazam to investigate.

Meanwhile, Mister Mind holds the League hostage. He transforms them into children using a serum concocted by Doctor Sivana, making them more susceptible to his mind-control powers. Batman avoids being mind-controlled and escapes with Shazam's help. To ease Batman's distrust, Shazam reveals his identity and recounts his origin: After helping Batman defeat Two-Face, (Note: As depicted in Lego DC Batman: Family Matters (2019)) Billy was chosen to become The Wizard's new champion, having deemed Billy worthy after the failure of his previous champion, Black Adam. Billy accepted The Wizard's offer, but still longs for a family of his own. Empathizing with Billy, Batman reveals his identity and offers him his trust.

Across the world, the mind-controlled Leaguers steal food for Mister Mind, but Batman and Shazam save them. Reunited, the League fights their way to Mister Mind. During their confrontation, Mister Mind metamorphizes into a giant moth monster. The League escapes to the Rock, but Mister Mind follows them and begins devouring it. As he increases in size, Mister Mind frees Black Adam. However, Black Adam betrays Mister Mind, using his powers to reduce him into a caterpillar and send him to space. Seeking vengeance against the Wizard, Adam attacks the Rock and overwhelms the League. While the Wizard clashes with Adam, the League escapes to Earth. Knowing Adam will be coming for them, they make preparations and rebuild their vehicles to account for their reduced age.

Arriving on Earth, Adam fights and overpowers the League. Remembering the Wizard's advice and how Adam was able to depower Mister Mind, Shazam uses his lightning to share his powers with the League, enhancing their abilities and returning them to their normal age. This also reveals his secret identity to them, but they are not upset and tell him that his age doesn't matter as long as they do the right thing. The League uses their new powers to defeat Adam, and Billy uses the magic lightning to regain his powers from the other Leaguers, while Adam is depowered and reduced to a mortal man. With Adam arrested and their adulthood restored, the League shows their gratitude by reuniting Billy with his sister Mary and Uncle Dudley.

In a mid-credit scene, Lobo apprehends Mister Mind for his $1,000,000,000,000 bounty, much to his dismay.

== Cast ==
- Sean Astin as Shazam
- Zach Callison as Billy Batson, Jimmy Olsen
- Troy Baker as Batman / Bruce Wayne, Carmine Falcone
- Nolan North as Superman / Clark Kent, Alfred Pennyworth
- Grey Griffin as Wonder Woman, Lois Lane
- Cristina Milizia as Green Lantern / Jessica Cruz
- James Arnold Taylor as The Flash, Dummy
- Imari Williams as Black Adam / Teth-Adam
- Fred Tatasciore as Lobo, Oom
- Ralph Garman as Wizard
- Dee Bradley Baker as Jeepers, Dr. Sivana, Crocodile-Man
- Jennifer Hale as Mary Batson, L.N. Ambassador
- Tom Kenny as Penguin, Perry White
- Greg Ellis as Mr. Mind
- Erica Lindbeck as Greeter, Farmer
- Josh Keaton as Executive, Terrance

== Reception ==
Tom Cassidy for Common Sense Media gave the film a three out of five star rating and commented, "The movie is bright, colorful, and lighthearted. It's rendered in the very familiar Lego style that is across toys, video games, TV series, and movies. This nudges it toward brand saturation. But it's delivered with enough wit and fun to make it not feel cynical. The superhero action and storyline runs out of steam a little early. But with its strong themes of trust and teamwork, along with Shazam's unending enthusiasm, it's a cheery time suitable for a range of ages."
