= Shazam!: The New Beginning =

1987 comic book

Publication information
- Publisher: DC Comics
- Format: Limited series
- Publication date: April – July 1987
- No. of issues: 4
- Main character(s): Captain Marvel; Shazam; Doctor Sivana; Black Adam

Creative team
- Written by: Dann Thomas; Roy Thomas
- Artist: Tom Mandrake
- Penciller(s): Tom Mandrake; Rick Stasi
- Inker(s): Tom Mandrake; Jan Duursema; Rick Magyar
- Letterer(s): Augustin Mas; Jean Simek
- Colorist(s): Carl Gafford; Joe Orlando; Nansi Hoolahan; Tom Ziuko
- Editor: Mike Gold

Shazam!: The New Beginning is a comic book four-issue limited series published from April to July 1987. This title is a spin-off from the DC comic title Legends.

It introduced Captain Marvel in a post-Crisis on Infinite Earths world. This version was the first version of Captain Marvel to have Billy Batson retain his child like personality whilst in his Captain Marvel form. The book sold quite well but never developed into a full series. Another attempt at an ongoing series would not be made again until 1994 with The Power of Shazam!, which revised Shazam's origin again.

== Plot ==
After Billy Batson's parents die in a car crash, he is adopted by his step uncle Doctor Sivana. Sivana's children persuade Billy he would be better off living with them rather than his Uncle Dudley, as Dudley's only income is semi-employment as a stage magician with Hoppy, his rabbit. After being adopted, Billy discovers that Sivana caused his parents' death to gain their life insurance money to fund his experiments. Billy runs away to a magic subway where he meets an elderly man who reveals himself to be a wizard named Shazam. Shazam informs Billy he has been given magic powers to fight Black Adam and other forces of evil.

Billy decides to use his powers to leave San Francisco where he lives to find his Uncle Dudley who now lives in Alberta, Canada.

Meanwhile, Sivana has used his machine to unleash Black Adam. They join forces to take over the world. Black Adam's first deed is to kidnap an airplane full of passengers. Captain Marvel fights him, leading Black Adam to bury the plane into the sea.

Captain Marvel ultimately tricks Black Adam into activating Dr. Sivana's machine to send him back to the Netherrealm and rescues the hostages.

Dr. Sivana's evil schemes are revealed and he becomes a fugitive from the FBI, fleeing to Mexico. As he drinks in a bar and muses about how he needs a better partner, there is a close-up of the worm at the bottom of Sivana's tequila bottle.

Billy is then raised by his Uncle Dudley and gets a job working in radio as a news reporter.

== Reception ==
Newsarama considered Shazam!: The New Beginning as one of the best Captain Marvel stories ever written, while Screen Rant wasn't as complimentary to the book.

== Bibliography ==
- Misiroglu, Gina (2006). Supervillain Book: The Evil Side of Comics and Hollywood. City: Visible Ink Press. ISBN 1578591783.
