= Doctor Sivana =

DC Comics character

- Doctor Sivana as he appeared on the Convergence: SHAZAM! (2015). Art by Evan "Doc" Shaner.

Publication information
- Publisher: Fawcett Comics (1939–1953); DC Comics (1972–present)
- First appearance: Whiz Comics #2 (cover date Feb. 1940, release date Dec. 1939)
- Created by: Bill Parker; C. C. Beck

In-story information
- Alter ego: Thaddeus Bodog Sivana Sr.
- Species: Human
- Team affiliations: Sivana Family; Monster Society of Evil; Legion of Doom; Injustice League; Fearsome Five; Secret Society of Super Villains; Science Squad
- Partnerships: Mister Mind; Black Adam
- Notable aliases: Thaddeus: World's Wickedest Scientist; Georgia: Doctor G. World's Wickedest Girl
- Abilities: Genius-level intellect; Skilled manipulator and strategist

Thaddeus Bodog Sivana is a supervillain appearing in American comic books published by DC Comics. Doctor Sivana is the archnemesis of Captain Marvel created by Bill Parker and C. C. Beck, first appearing in Whiz Comics #2 (cover-dated February 1940) by Fawcett Comics. A mad scientist and inventor bent on world domination, the character was established as Captain Marvel's main archenemy during the Golden Age, appearing in over half of the Fawcett Captain Marvel stories published between 1939 and 1953. Sivana has kept his role as one of the key archenemies of Captain Marvel (now Shazam) throughout the character's appearances in DC Comics, which eventually acquired the rights to Fawcett's superhero characters. In 2009, Doctor Sivana was ranked as IGN's 82nd-greatest comic book villain of all time.

Doctor Sivana has made his cinematic debut in the DC Extended Universe 2019 film Shazam!, portrayed by Mark Strong, who reprised the role in a post-credits scene cameo in the 2023 sequel Shazam! Fury of the Gods.

== Publication history ==
=== Fawcett Comics and Pre-Crisis DC Comics ===
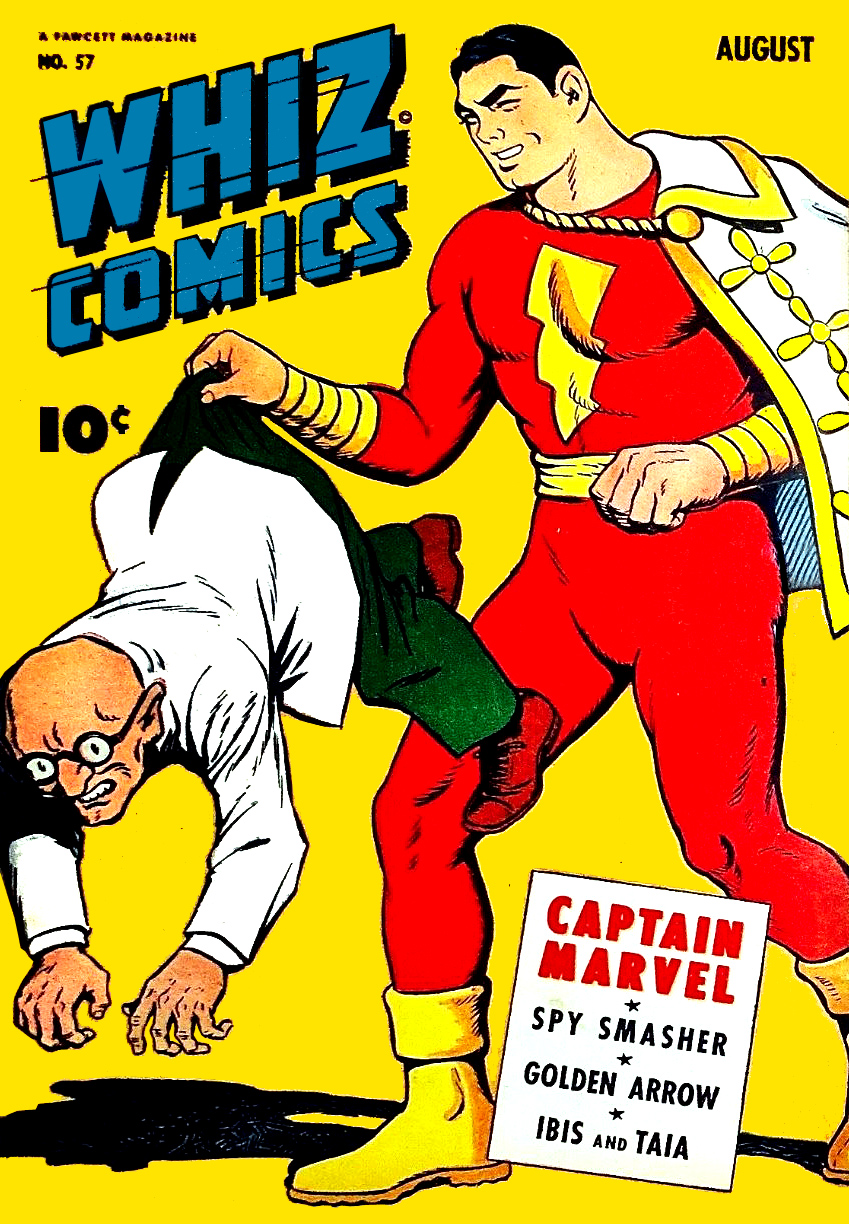
Doctor Sivana (left) and Captain Marvel on the cover of Whiz Comics #57 (August 1944).Art by C.C. Beck.

Infamously evil, Doctor Sivana appeared in well over half of all of the Golden Age Captain Marvel comic stories, and in all of the first four stories, after having deduced Captain Marvel's dual identity as boy radio broadcaster Billy Batson early on. Depicted as a brilliant, if evil, scientist, Sivana used all manner of unusual inventions and techniques against the Marvels. He was at first a good man who wanted to help humanity, but big business, bosses, and other concerns blocked and checked him and even called him mad, until, embittered, he turned against humanity and moved to Venus. He somehow held high status among the beings of the planet Venus. He returned to Earth, establishing himself as a villain, and clashed with Capt. Marvel in the latter's first fight. Along with the Marvel Family, Sivana entered publishing limbo in 1953, following a ruling in the National Comics Publications v. Fawcett Publications court case finding that Captain Marvel was an illegal infringement of the existing copyrights on Superman.

National Comics (today DC Comics) acquired the rights to the Captain Marvel characters in 1972, relaunching them in a new title, Shazam! the following February. The characters' 20-year absence from publication was explained as the result of Doctor Sivana and the Sivana Family having trapped the Marvels, their friends, other superheroes, and, by accident, themselves in a sphere of Suspendium, due to Sivana Jr. distracting Doctor Sivana by slapping him on the back in congratulation and making him crash the spaceship into the Suspendium sphere, a compound that kept them in suspended animation from 1953 until 1973. They were released when the Suspendium sphere neared the sun, melting it enough that Captain Marvel was revived. He and the other Marvels then pushed it back to Earth. The Sivanas escaped in their spaceship but were captured by Captain Marvel in the same issue despite another attempt at world domination. He still makes many attempts at world domination, including a multi-issue storyline where he traveled across America, threatening to destroy entire cities unless he was acknowledged as Rightful Ruler of the Universe. In Shazam! #28 (1977) he was responsible for bringing Black Adam back using his reincarnation machine.

=== Shazam! The New Beginning and The Power of Shazam! ===
Sivana continued to appear in Shazam!-related stories through the Crisis on Infinite Earths limited series in 1985. He was reintroduced by Roy Thomas and Tom Mandrake in the miniseries Shazam!: The New Beginning in 1987. This Sivana was the same mad scientist that the previous one had been, except that he only had two children (Beautia and Magnificus), and was Billy Batson's step-uncle.

Jerry Ordway revised the character of Sivana for his 1994 graphic novel The Power of Shazam! and the resulting ongoing series, and this revision has been retained in all following DC publications. The modern Sivana, in addition to being a mad scientist, was also a powerful and influential tycoon, similar to Lex Luthor. The former CEO of his own Sivana Industries, Sivana's corrupted dealings and crossing of Captain Marvel led to his own destruction and his intense hatred of the Marvel Family. Beautia and Magnificus Sivana are reintroduced again in this series; their mother, Sivana's ex-wife Venus, is briefly seen in The Power of Shazam! #27.

=== Later appearances ===
After The Power of Shazam! series ended in 1999, Sivana was rarely seen until Outsiders vol. 3 #13–15 (August–October 2004), in which he reorganizes the supervillain group the Fearsome Five, appointing himself leader. Sivana and his four associates Mammoth, Psimon, Jinx, and Shimmer (a fifth, Gizmo, is killed by Sivana for challenging the scientist's position as resident genius) continued to appear at irregular intervals in the pages of Outsiders.

== Fictional character biography ==
=== Pre-Crisis ===
Sivana is a short, bald, self-described mad scientist with a penchant for developing unusual technologies. He often plots to do away with Captain Marvel and his Marvel Family, but is usually thwarted in his plans. His trademark phrases are "Curses! Foiled again!" and his mocking laughter "Heh! Heh! Heh!" He also coined the insulting name Big Red Cheese to refer to Captain Marvel, a name that the Captain's friends have adopted with which to light-heartedly tease him.

Doctor Sivana with his children Thaddeus Sivana Jr. and Georgia Sivana. Interior art from The Marvel Family #10 (1947) by C. C. Beck and Pete Costanza

Thaddeus Bodog Sivana, born in 1892, began with the best intentions and was one of Europe's best scientific minds, with progressive scientific ideas that could revolutionize industry but were rejected by everyone he approached. Laughed out of society by people who called his inventions impractical and his science a fake, Sivana took his family to the planet Venus in a spaceship he had invented. There he stayed until his children were grown, and Earth not so backward as when he left it. Since his children were adults by 1940, his departure from Earth would implicitly have been the late 1910s or early 1920s. During his years away, struggling to tame the Venusian jungle, Sivana turned bitter and planned his revenge against the world that had shunned him.

He initially plotted his revenge with a radio silencer that would disable all radio communications permanently. He tried to extort $50 million, only to be stopped by Captain Marvel in his first adventure. Cap broke through the window of the building where Sivana was hiding and defeated the guards, binding them securely with tubing ripped from the radio-silencer. Sivana planned to kill Captain Marvel with a blast from his Atom-Smasher, but Cap leaped back out the window and escaped. During the fight, Sivana's returning army angrily asked why Captain Marvel had defeated them in their war against America despite their highly advanced weaponry. Sivana appeared to have been killed by the Atom-Smasher blast, but he returned a short time later, having somehow learned Captain Marvel's identity. He sent a letter to Billy Batson to lure him to the planet Venus, disguising himself as 'Professor Xerxes Smith'. Sivana's henchmen bound and gagged Batson, and Sivana tried to take away his memory using a Memory Mangler. Billy regained his memory after stumbling into the cave of Shazam and accidentally saying the word "Shazam". Sivana's henchmen rebelled against him and set off an explosion that destroyed the Mangler. Ironically, Captain Marvel saved Sivana and his daughter Beautia Sivana, who the henchmen had left to die. Sivana continued to nurse a megalomaniacal grudge against humanity and also a personal enmity with the Marvel Family. This persisted even after Cap revealed Sivana's former benevolent inventions (which Sivana considered useless), leading to his being awarded the Nobel Prize in Physics. Far from being pleased, Sivana was insulted by the prize and stated that only when he was crowned Ruler of the Universe would he consider himself properly honored.

The Golden Age Sivana was a twice-widowed father with four children: good-natured adult daughter Beautia Sivana who, when first seen, was Empress of Venus. Beautia has bewitching beauty which affects men like a drug, which Sivana once used to try to make her win an election. Beautia's remaining siblings include the super-strong Magnificus Sivana, and evil teenagers Georgia Sivana and Thaddeus Sivana Jr. As the Sivana Family, Sivana, Georgia, and Sivana Jr. attempted to destroy Captain Marvel, Mary Marvel, and Captain Marvel Jr., respectively. They traveled through time via the Rock of Eternity to various points in the history of Atlantis (ancient, modern, and future). There they attempted to steal technology to build a machine that would create a barrier around the Earth, thereby preventing the Marvels from calling down lightning. Georgia and Thaddeus Jr. possess brilliant minds like their father and share his enmity with the Marvel Family, but Magnificus and Beautia rarely fight the Marvels. In fact, Beautia has an unrequited crush on Captain Marvel, not realizing that he is really an adolescent boy.

==== Post-Crisis ====
Following the Crisis on Infinite Earths miniseries, Sivana was first reintroduced as Billy Batson's step-uncle in a 1987 miniseries, Shazam! The New Beginning. Magnificus and Beautia were depicted as his only children.

A second retcon in 1994 established Sivana as a wealthy tycoon with political influence, similar to Lex Luthor, only to have the events surrounding an archaeological expedition to Egypt he sponsored lead to both the creation of Captain Marvel and the fall of Sivana's fortunes. Blaming Captain Marvel for his fall from grace, Sivana dedicated himself wholeheartedly to using his inventions and intellect against the Marvel Family. In current continuity, Sivana's ex-wife Venus is still alive, as are all four Sivana children. They resemble their Pre-Crisis counterparts.

The evil scientist appears briefly in the "Infinite Crisis" storyline. Sivana also appeared along with Lex Luthor in the four-issue 2005 limited series Superman/Shazam: First Thunder by Judd Winick and Joshua Middleton, which depicts the first meeting between Superman and Captain Marvel.

In the 2006–2007 limited series 52, Sivana was abducted to Oolong Island, a tropical paradise run by Intergang, where he and many other DC Universe "mad scientists" are allowed to live a hedonistic lifestyle while creating the inventions of their wildest dreams as members of the Science Squad and pitting them against one another. They create the Four Horsemen of the Apokolips and succeed in capturing Black Adam, whom Sivana then tortures for weeks, until Adam is freed by heroes storming the island. Georgia and Thaddeus Jr. were reintroduced in 52 Week Twenty-Six (November 1, 2006), in which they appear alongside Beautia, Magnificus, and Beautia and Magnificus' mother Venus, who wants Sivana found and has a charity dinner with the Black Marvel family.

Sivana later captures Mind and mutates him into a "hyperfly", a colossal moth-like figure with the ability to travel across time and realities.

On the cover of Justice League of America #13 vol. 2, Sivana appears as a member of the new Injustice League.

In the 2008 miniseries Final Crisis, he is placed on the new Society's inner circle by Libra. Sivana was with Libra when Calculator was accused of sending computer codes that would help the resistance. Sivana joins with Lex Luthor in betraying Libra, after being made to watch one of his own daughters succumb to the Anti-Life Equation. Sivana creates a device to shut down the Justifiers' helmets, allowing Luthor to attack Libra.

Sivana later appears as a member of Cheetah's Secret Society of Super Villains.

==== The New 52 onward ====
In September 2011, The New 52 reboots DC's continuity. In this new timeline, Doctor Sivana first appears in Justice League vol. 2 #7, depicted as a respected scientist desperate to save his family from an unknown plight. With science having failed him, he turns to magic (specifically the legend of Black Adam). Sivana's team finds what he believes to be Adam's tomb; while attempting to open it, he is partially blinded by magical lightning and gains the ability to perceive magic.

After Doctor Sivana's alliance with Black Adam fails, he attempts to directly access the Rock of Eternity, but is stopped by a magical shield and encounters Mister Mind. Introduced as a well-built man of average height, the corruption that results from using his magic-seeing eye causes the doctor to slowly wither to a form resembling his stooped, traditional Fawcett appearance.

In the fifth installment of the Multiversity series, Thunderworld (December 2014), Thaddeus Sivana of Earth-5 (a world populated by traditional interpretations of Shazam! characters) coordinates with his doppelgangers from many of the 52 worlds of the Multiverse to defeat the Marvel Family of Earth-5 and, eventually, conquer the remaining DC Multiverse. He has his three offspring Thaddeus Jr, Georgia, and Magnificus storm the Rock of Eternity and seize control of it, pitting themselves against their opponents, but soon finds he has been betrayed by the Legion of Sivanas and is defeated. The Legion continues to feature heavily in later chapters of The Multiversity. They invade Earth-42 and cull many of its heroes in Guidebook, and sell weapons sourced from alternate worlds to the Freedom Fighters of Earth-10 in Mastermen.

In Doomsday Clock, Doctor Sivana is among the villains who attend the underground meeting held by Riddler to discuss the Superman Theory.

Sivana later works with Mister Mind to free the Monster Society of Evil from the Monsterlands. They also encounter and free Superboy-Prime before being defeated by the Shazam Family.

== Abilities ==
Doctor Sivana's intelligence is so great that it borders on a superhuman level. He has mastered all scientific and technological disciplines, as well as knowledge of various ancient myths, legends, and cultures. Sivana once discovered a mathematical formula which, when recited, allows him to become intangible.

== Other versions ==
- An alternate universe variant of Sivana appears in Superman: Red Son.
- An alternate universe variant of Sivana appears in Shazam! The Monster Society of Evil. This version is the Attorney General of the United States.
- An alternate universe variant of Sivana appears in Billy Batson and the Magic of Shazam!.
- Several alternate universe variants of Sivana appear in The Multiversity, including a snake version from Earth-26 and a vampire version from Earth-43.

== In other media ==
=== Television ===
- Doctor Sivana was originally meant to appear in the third season of Super Friends as the leader of the Legion of Doom. However, due to Filmation's Shazam! series being in development at that time, he was not permitted to appear and replaced with Lex Luthor.
- Doctor Sivana appears in Legends of the Superheroes, portrayed by Howard Morris. This version is a member of the Legion of Doom.
- Doctor Sivana and his children Thaddeus Jr. and Georgia appear in The Kid Super Power Hour with Shazam!, with Thaddeus Sr. voiced by Alan Oppenheimer.
- Doctor Sivana appears in Batman: The Brave and the Bold, voiced by Jim Piddock. This version is the founder and initial leader of the Monster Society of Evil until Mister Mind usurps him.
- Doctor Sivana appears in the Mad segment "Shazam! & Cat".

=== Film ===
- An alternate universe incarnation of Doctor Sivana appears in Justice League: Gods and Monsters, voiced by Daniel Hagen. This version is a member of Lex Luthor's "Project Fair Play", a weapons contingency program meant to counter their universe's Justice League if necessary, before being killed by the Metal Men.
- Doctor Sivana appears in Lego DC Shazam! Magic and Monsters, voiced by Dee Bradley Baker. This version is an unwilling brainwashed slave of Mister Mind.
- Doctor Thaddeus Sivana appears in the DC Extended Universe (DCEU) film Shazam!, portrayed by Mark Strong as an adult and Ethan Pugiotto as a child. This version suffered abuse at the hands of his unnamed father, the CEO of Sivana Industries, and brother Sid. As a child, Sivana was transported to the Rock of Eternity by the wizard Shazam, who tests him for the right to wield his powers. However, Thaddeus succumbs to the Seven Deadly Sins' influence, causing the wizard to deem him unworthy and send him back. In his failed attempt at returning, Sivana inadvertently caused a car accident that left his father paraplegic. As an adult, he succeeds in returning to the Rock, fuses with the Sins, and overpowers Shazam. While murdering his father, Sid, and Sivana Industries' board of directors, the Sins warn him Shazam found a successor. Sivana attacks Billy Batson in an attempt to take his powers for himself. However, Batson shares Shazam's power with his foster siblings, who help him defeat Sivana and re-imprison the Sins. In a mid-credits scene, having been incarcerated at Rock Falls Penitentiary, Sivana mounts a failed attempt at regaining his lost power until he is visited by Mister Mind.
- Doctor Thaddeus Sivana appears in the post-credits scene of the DCEU film Shazam! Fury of the Gods, portrayed again by Mark Strong.

=== Video games ===
- Doctor Sivana appears in DC Universe Online, voiced by Matt Hislope.
- Doctor Sivana appears as a character summon in Scribblenauts Unmasked: A DC Comics Adventure.
- Doctor Sivana appears as an unlockable playable character in Lego DC Super-Villains as part of the "Shazam! Movie Pack" DLC.

=== Miscellaneous ===
- Doctor Sivana appears in Justice League Unlimited #15.
- The Gods and Monsters incarnation of Doctor Sivana appears in the Justice League: Gods and Monsters Chronicles episode "Bomb", voiced again by Daniel Hagen.
