= Spy Smasher =

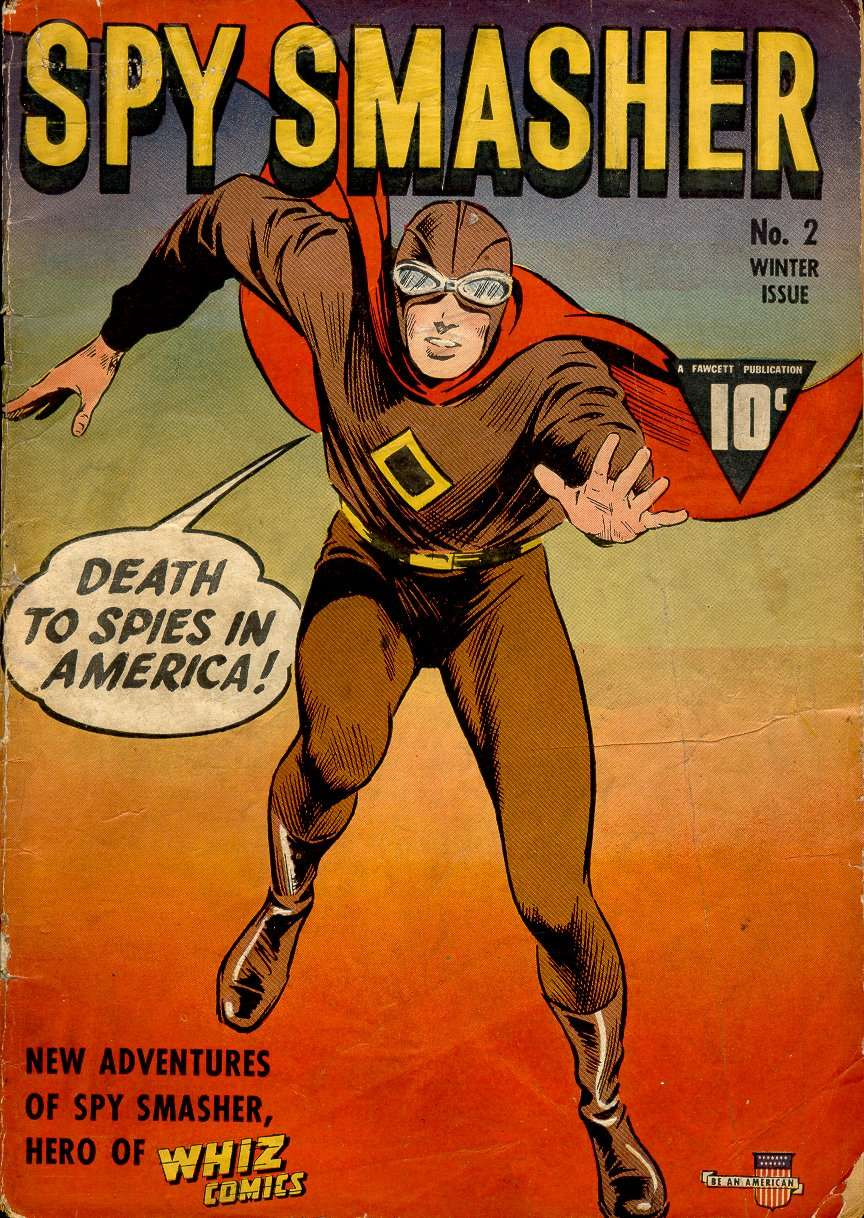
- Spy Smasher #2 (1941). Art by Charles Sultan.

Publication information
- Publisher: Fawcett Comics (1939–1948); DC Comics (1976–present)
- First appearance: (Alan); Whiz Comics #2 (February 1940, historical); The Power of Shazam! #8 (October 1995, canon) (Katarina); Birds of Prey #100 (January 2007)
- Created by: (Alan); Bill Parker; C. C. Beck (Katarina); Gail Simone; Nicola Scott

In-story information
- Full name: Alan Armstrong; Katarina Armstrong
- Team affiliations: (Alan); Squadron of Justice (Katarina); Federal Bureau of Investigation; United States Department of Homeland Security; United States Department of Defense; Department of Extranormal Operations; Central Intelligence Agency; NASA; United Nations; Department of Defence (Australia); Bureau of Alcohol, Tobacco, Firearms and Explosives; MI6; Checkmate
- Notable aliases: (Alan); Crime Smasher
- Abilities: (Alan); Skilled hand-to-hand combatant Master detective Intelligent scientist and inventor Use of gadgets and a specialized vehicle (Katarina); Skilled hand-to-hand combatant Extensive political connections Expert markswoman

Spy Smasher is the name of two fictional characters appearing in comics published by Fawcett and DC Comics. The first is a superhero that was formerly owned and published by Fawcett Comics. The second is a female anti-terrorism government agent and published by DC.

== History ==
=== Alan Armstrong ===
Similar to Batman and the Blue Beetle (Ted Kord), Spy Smasher (secretly the "wealthy Virginia sportsman" Alan Armstrong) is a master detective, equipped with a number of gadgets and a specialized vehicle, the "Gyrosub", which was a combination of an airplane, an automobile, and a submarine. Created by Bill Parker and C. C. Beck, Spy Smasher was introduced in Whiz Comics #2 (February 1940). Alongside Captain Marvel, Spy Smasher became one of the magazine's most popular characters. His perpetual enemy was the Mask, the mastermind of a deadly spy ring. He also fought the America-Smasher, the Angel and the Blitzys.

In Whiz Comics #16-18, Spy Smasher was briefly brainwashed by the Mask to fight Captain Marvel, but finally Captain Marvel was able to restore his mind.

With the end of World War II and the Japanese surrender in August 1945, Spy Smasher was left without a battle to fight. His name was changed to Crime Smasher in Whiz Comics #76 (July 1946), and he soon fell out of favor. One issue of Crime Smasher was published in 1948, and then the character disappeared.

In 1953, Fawcett ceased publication of all superhero comics, after settling a lawsuit against DC Comics over Captain Marvel being an infringement on the copyright of Superman, agreeing to cease publishing Captain Marvel.

After DC Comics obtained the rights to the Fawcett characters in 1972, Spy Smasher began appearing irregularly in DC Comics, presented as one of the heroes of Earth-S prior to Crisis on Infinite Earths. He first appeared in Crisis in Eternity, as a member of the Squadron of Justice when King Kull had captured Shazam and the Elders, and teamed up with other villains to wipe out life on all three Earths, and defeated Ibac on Earth-Two as he attacked Atlantis by tricking him into saying "I back down from no-one", defeating him as saying his name causes him to turn into a normal man and vice versa. The character was used prominently in the 1990s series The Power of Shazam!, in which aged Alan Armstrong often recounts his adventures as Spy Smasher. The Power of Shazam! #24 was dedicated to Armstrong's recounting of a Cold War-era mission he undertook with an archaeologist named C.C. Batson to Batson's children, Billy (alter-ego of Captain Marvel) and Mary (alter-ego of Mary Marvel).

While Alan was still Spy Smasher in that story, a crossover between Power of Shazam and Starman in 1997 included Jack Knight running over the history of the Fawcett City heroes, and mentioning that he thought Spy Smasher became Crime Smasher after the war but was unsure.

AC Comics has published reprints of some Golden Age Spy Smasher stories that have lapsed into the public domain. The character also made a cameo appearance in the inaugural issue of Image Comics' Next Issue Project.

=== Katarina Armstrong ===
A new Spy Smasher, government agent Katarina Armstrong, created by Gail Simone, first appears in Birds of Prey #100 (January 2007). She is a high-ranking anti-terrorism agent who is affiliated with several American, Commonwealth, and United Nations agencies. Her relation to Alan Armstrong has not been revealed, though her secret identity and costume seem clearly inspired by him. She is depicted in her first appearances as having a domineering demeanor, and is not hesitant to kill to complete missions. Having forced Oracle to work for her, she plans to take over the Birds of Prey organization and usurp Oracle's position. Issue #103 indicates that Katarina and Oracle were friends in college. At some point prior to Katarina's debut, they became rivals. That issue shows a flashback of both women competing in a race, with Katarina beating Barbara by cheating but immediately confessing to the judges after she had won.

Katarina accompanies the Birds on a mission in Russia, and in a conflict with the Secret Six, Katarina finds her equal marksman in Deadshot. Katarina assumes leadership of the Birds from Oracle and fires Lady Blackhawk for dissent. Back at Oracle's base, she is challenged to a fight by Oracle, who then manages to give Katarina a proper beating. She is humiliated when she faces all of Barbara's living former agents. Spy Smasher leaves disgraced after being threatened by Black Canary, but before doing so also gives Oracle information on Misfit's background.

It was later mentioned in Checkmate #16 by Sasha Bordeaux that Josephine Tautin had "drop-kicked her down a deep, dark hole. Something she quite enjoyed doing, incidentally". Checkmate #18 has Sasha personally apologising to Barbara for Katarina's actions.

In the aftermath of Final Crisis, Katarina is seen being held prisoner by the Global Peace Agency. The GPA agents apparently erase all of her memories by "resetting" her brain, telling Cameron Chase that Katarina can hear their conversations but can no longer process what the sounds mean. Her current fate is unknown, though it is implied that she was returned to normal, as with many other characters in the story, after Nemesis and Chase use the cosmic treadmill.

During the events of Brightest Day, an unknown villain begins targeting the members of the Birds of Prey. Oracle initially muses that it could be Katarina's doing, as she has the means and motive to harm the Birds, but it is eventually revealed to be the work of the White Canary.

Spy Smasher is eventually revealed to be alive and well when she recruits Bane and his new team of mercenaries (consisting of himself, Jeannette, Lady Vic, King Shark, Dwarfstar, and Giganta) to invade and claim Skartaris in the name of the U.S.

==== Characterization ====
Creator Gail Simone said on Katarina: "I felt the DCU needed a Jack Bauer. In these early issues, she looks like a pointed allegory to the abuse of powers by the government, but she doesn't see it that way, and she's a lot more complex than that. It'd be a cheat to simply make her evil and completely hate-able, I think. She's got some levels. And she knows Babs' weaknesses. I like her. She's very very dark... Even above [Barbara and Katarina's] competitive natures, there is a perfectly valid and honest ideological difference of opinion there. Babs believes what she's doing is necessary, Katarina believes what Babs is doing is treason. They actually like each other, but like brothers fighting on opposite sides of the Civil War, the distance between them is so vast and clearly drawn that they can't even hope to reconcile. They were friends; their ideals make them bitter enemies".

== Powers and abilities ==
Alan Armstrong is an intelligent scientist and inventor, a master detective and a skilled hand-to-hand combatant. He also possessed a number of gadgets and a specialized vehicle.

Katarina Armstrong is an expert markswoman and a skilled hand-to-hand combatant on a similar level to Deadshot. She claims to be of higher political authority than anyone in the United States, even the President, but is later outranked in an issue of Checkmate by Sasha Bordeaux. Although she explicitly states that her job is to kill people, specifically terrorists and those who aim to harm the United States, she has yet to be directly depicted as taking a life.

== In other media ==
- The Alan Armstrong incarnation of Spy Smasher appears in a self-titled film serial, portrayed by Kane Richmond. This version is an American freelance agent in Nazi-occupied France who was originally believed to have been killed in a plane crash and has an identical twin brother and a fiancée named Eve Corby.
- The Alan Armstrong incarnation of Spy Smasher appears in a flashback in the Justice League Unlimited episode "Patriot Act", voiced by an uncredited Nathan Fillion.
- The Alan Armstrong incarnation of Spy Smasher appears in DC Universe Online.
