= Dummy (DC Comics) =

Dummy is the name of several characters appearing in American comic books published by DC Comics.

== Publication history ==
The original Dummy first appears in Leading Comics #1 and was created by Mort Weisinger and Mort Meskin. He is not to be confused with Scarface, the ventriloquist dummy/alter-ego operated by Arnold Wesker. In addition to his Leading Comics appearances, the Dummy fought the Vigilante in six Golden Age stories: Action Comics #58 (March 1943), #63 (August 1943), #69 (February 1944), #75 (August 1944), #87 (August 1945) and #96 (May 1946); although the Vigilante remained a regular Action Comics feature until issue #198 (November 1954), issue #96 was the Dummy's final appearance for many years.

The second, known as Danny the Dummy, first appears in Batman #134 (September 1960) and was created by Bill Finger and Sheldon Moldoff.

== Fictional character biographies ==
=== Original Dummy ===
Dummy

Publication information
- Publisher: DC Comics
- First appearance: Leading Comics #1 (December 1941)
- Created by: Mort Weisinger (writer); Mort Meskin (artist)

In-story information
- Team affiliations: Monster Society of Evil; Injustice Unlimited
- Abilities: Skilled inventor

The Dummy is an archenemy of the Golden Age era Vigilante, and a skilled inventor of weapons. As the leader of a criminal gang, the Dummy pretends to be a ventriloquist's dummy through whom the gang's supposed "true" leader conveys instructions, the gang never suspecting that the Dummy is their leader. The Dummy's secret identity is never revealed, and it is never specified whether he is a human or a dummy that has been brought to life. The Dummy is a member of a group of villains brought together by the Hand to cause crimes around the nation, which led to the first case of the Seven Soldiers of Victory; his particular efforts are prevented by the Vigilante, whom he had encountered before.

Dummy later escapes from prison with the help of his large companion Bobo. Then he and Bobo embark on a crime spree that involved them robbing the Jeweler's Exchange. When the package is opened, Dummy poses as a mechanical toy to fool the owners until he uses knock-out gas. Both of them are defeated by Vigilante and Stuff the Chinatown Kid and surrender to the police.

In his latest racket, Dummy has his minion Flipper pose as a ventriloquist to get gigs at high society shows. Flipper uses a look-alike of Dummy as the real Dummy is operating in the crowd. After breaking out of their respective traps, Vigilante and Stuff defeat Dummy and Flipper and hand them over to the police.

Dummy shrinks himself and his henchmen to small size to get onto a cargo train. When the shrinkage wears off, they rob the train and make their getaway. Despite being affected by the shrink ray, Vigilante and Stuff turn the tables on Dummy and his henchmen, who are handed over to the police.

The Dummy was shown to be responsible for the death of Stuff the Chinatown Kid.

The Dummy appears in All-Star Squadron, where he is recruited for Mister Mind's Monster Society of Evil. In the course of this storyline, the Dummy passes through Alan Scott's force field unimpeded, implying that the Dummy is made of wood (which would make him immune to Scott's power) and is indeed a living dummy.

In modern times, the Dummy returns and takes over the criminal organization Injustice Unlimited to battle Infinity, Inc.

After post-Crisis on Infinite Earths contiunity, Stuff was killed by mobster Bugsy Siegel rather than Dummy. During a fight with Vigilante, Dummy dies by falling off a cat walk onto a lit spotlight.

A new version of Dummy is introduced in DC Rebirth. This version is a Victorian man who was turned into a wooden dummy by a wizard's curse and was imprisoned in the Monsterlands following a fight with the "heroes of yesterday". Dummy introduces himself as Exile #413 and directs Mister Mind and Doctor Sivana to a boat that will take them to the Dungeon of Eternity. He cannot go with them to the Dungeon of Eternity because he is made of wood and cannot deal with water. After the Monster Society of Evil is freed from the Dungeon of Eternity, Dummy is displeased that he was left behind, as Mister Mind promised him freedom. Superboy-Prime states to Dummy that he will free him in exchange for Dummy removing the red sun outside of Prime's prison. Dummy does so and is double-crossed by Prime, who attacks him with his heat vision.

=== Danny the Dummy ===
Dummy

Publication information
- Publisher: DC Comics
- First appearance: Batman #134 (September 1960)
- Created by: Bill Finger (writer); Sheldon Moldoff (artist)

In-story information
- Alter ego: Danny the Dummy

Danny the Dummy, a pint-sized ventriloquist in a top hat and suit, has a hit act in which he plays the dummy to a normal-sized "ventriloquist" named Matt (who is revealed as the real dummy at the end of each show). People invariably referring to Danny as "the Dummy" infuriates him, and inspires him to use dummies for crime to make dummies out of the law.

== Powers and abilities ==
The original Dummy is a skilled inventor. He wields a cane in battle that can fire powerful force beams.

== In other media ==
=== Television ===
The first incarnation of the Dummy makes minor non-speaking appearances in Justice League Unlimited as a member of Gorilla Grodd's Secret Society.

=== Film ===
- The first incarnation of the Dummy makes a cameo appearance in Justice League: The New Frontier.
- The first incarnation of the Dummy appears in Lego DC Shazam! Magic and Monsters, voiced by James Arnold Taylor. This version is a member of the Monster Society of Evil.

=== Miscellaneous ===
The first incarnation of the Dummy appears in a flashback depicted in issue #4 of the Arrowverse tie-in comic miniseries Earth-Prime.
