= The Power of Shazam! =

1994 graphic novel by Jerry Ordway

- The Power of Shazam! original hardcover graphic novel, cover art by Jerry Ordway.

Publication information
- Publisher: DC Comics
- Schedule: Vol. 1: One-shot; Vol. 2: Monthly
- Format: Vol. 1: Graphic novel Vol. 2: Standard U.S., four-color, ongoing
- Publication date: Vol. 1: 1994; Vol. 2: March 1995 - March 1999, 1996 (Annual)
- No. of issues: Vol. 1: 1 Vol. 2: 49 (47, plus 1 Annual and issue #1,000,000)
- Main character(s): Both; Captain Marvel; Shazam; Doctor Sivana; Black Adam; Vol. 2 Captain Marvel, Jr. Mary Marvel; Mister Mind

Creative team
- Written by: Jerry Ordway
- Artist: Jerry Ordway
- Penciller(s): Peter Krause; Jerry Ordway
- Inker(s): Mike Manley; Dick Giordano; Jerry Ordway
- Colorist: Glenn Whitmore

The Power of Shazam! is a 1994 hardcover graphic novel, written and painted by Jerry Ordway for DC Comics. The 96-page story, depicting the revamped origins of former Fawcett Comics superhero Captain Marvel, was followed by an ongoing series, also titled The Power of Shazam!, which ran from 1995 to 1999.

== History ==
=== The graphic novel ===
After a previous retcon by Roy Thomas and Tom Mandrake in 1987 with the Shazam!: The New Beginning miniseries, Captain Marvel was again given a revised origin in the 1994 graphic novel The Power of Shazam!. Captain Marvel's origin would also be retold in Jeff Smith's Shazam!: The Monster Society of Evil limited series in 2007, though this origin takes place outside of DC continuity.

Cover art from the trade paperback edition of The Power of Shazam! graphic novel (released in 1995), art by Jerry Ordway.

As The Power of Shazam! graphic novel opens, ten-year-old Billy Batson's parents, both archeologists, are working in Egypt, excavating the tomb of Ramses II with their associate Theo Adam. Murdering the elder Batsons, Adam also kidnaps their young daughter Mary and steals a scarab necklace once attached to one of the sarcophagi in the tomb. Billy had been left behind at home in Fawcett City because of poor school grades. As in the Fawcett Comics origin story from Whiz Comics #2 (1940), Billy is abandoned by his cruel uncle Ebenezer, and becomes a paperboy to earn a living. One night, Billy meets a dark-clothed stranger outside of a subway tunnel, and follows the stranger onto a magic subway car. The subway car leads Billy to the realm of the Wizard Shazam, who assigns the boy as his successor. By speaking Shazam's name, Billy is struck by a bolt of magic lightning and transformed into Captain Marvel, an adult superhero.

As Captain Marvel, Billy thwarts a plan by Theo Adam and his employer, the rich tycoon Doctor Sivana, to destroy the WHIZ radio building and silence a witness to Adam's murders. Adam's encounters with Marvel, who is the "spitting image of C.C. Batson", along with the clues from the expedition, lead him to realize he is the reincarnation of Teth-Adam, the original heir to the power of Shazam. Upon crossing the Wizard, Teth-Adam was killed and his powers drawn into a scarab, the very same scarab that Adam stole from the tomb after killing the Batsons. Taking the scarab from Sivana's trophy room, Adam says the Wizard's name and is struck by magic lightning, becoming Black Adam.

Adam and Captain Marvel battle each other on the grounds of the Sivana-funded Fawcett World Fair, with Marvel winning the battle by snatching Adam's scarab from him. Marvel takes Adam to the Wizard, who takes Adam's voice and wipes his memory. Billy later learns that the stranger who led Billy to the Wizard was the spirit of his father, and that his sister Mary is still alive. Billy promises, as Captain Marvel, to fight injustice and evil, and also to find his missing sister. Meanwhile, Sivana has lost all of his money and possessions due to the destruction of his properties by Marvel and Adam, and swears revenge on the Captain.

=== The series ===
Cover art from The Power of Shazam! #1 (March 1995), art by Jerry Ordway.

Ordway's graphic novel was a success, winning the Comics Buyer's Guide Fan Award for Favorite Original Graphic Album of 1994, and led to the publication of an ongoing Power of Shazam! series, set four years after the graphic novel. The series, which began publication in March 1995, reintroduced many of the characters from Fawcett Comics into current DC continuity, including Mary Bromfield/Mary Marvel, Freddy Freeman/Captain Marvel, Jr., Beautia Sivana, Mister Tawky Tawny, Bulletman, Minute-Man, the Spy Smasher, Ibis and Taia, and even Hoppy the Marvel Bunny. Villains reincarnated in the series included Ibac, Mister Mind, Mister Atom, Aunt Minerva, and Blaze and Satanus from the Superman titles, who were retconned as the wizard Shazam's illegitimate children with a demoness (name unknown).

Mary Marvel was introduced as an adult instead of in her traditional teenage form, and insisted upon sharing the name of "Captain Marvel" with her brother. Captain Marvel, Jr., resenting being called "Junior" all of the time and needing a name he could say without calling down the magic lightning (his magic word being "Captain Marvel"), renamed himself "CM3". Jerry Ordway wrote all of the stories for the series and the one Annual, and provided painted covers in the style of the graphic novel as well. Peter Krause, Mike Manley, Dick Giordano, and Ordway himself served as the series' main artists.

The book was cancelled with issue #47 in March 1999 (issue #1,000,000 was published in November 1998 as part of the DC One Million event, giving the main series a total of 48 issues published). One Annual was also published in 1996, bringing the total number of issues to 49.

==== Blackest Night ====
In January 2010, The Power of Shazam! had a single issue revival (#48, continuing from the (vol. 2) numbering) tying into DC's Blackest Night event. It involved Black Adam's dead protégé Osiris being reanimated as a Black Lantern, and battling his killer, the Apokoliptian crocodile man Sobek. Billy and Mary Batson, powerless after the events of Justice Society of America (vol. 3) #25, appear briefly in the issue.

=== Reprint collections ===
The Power of Shazam! #33 (Dec. 1997) was among the selected stories reprinted in the 2008 trade paperback Shazam! The Greatest Stories Ever Told (ISBN 1401216749), highlighting some of the best Captain Marvel tales published.

Issues #35-36 were collected in the Starman: To Reach the Stars trade paperback and in Starman Omnibus Volume 4.

Issues #38-41 were collected in DC Comics Presents: Shazam! #1 (Sept. 2011) and #44-47 were collected in DC Comics Presents: Shazam! #2 (Oct. 2011).

Issues #1-2 and 33 were among the stories reprinted in Shazam!: A Celebration of 75 Years hardcover collection (2015). (ISBN 978-1401255381)

In August 2020, the ongoing series was properly collected for the first time in the hardcover The Power of Shazam! Book One: In The Beginning, which collects the Power of Shazam! graphic novel, issues #1-12 of the ongoing series, plus a story from Superman & Batman Magazine #4; plus bonus material (ISBN 978-1401299415).

A second volume, The Power of Shazam! Book Two: The Worm Turns, was published only in trade paperback format in May 2023, collecting issues #13-23 of the ongoing series, as well as the Annual, "Playing with Fire" from Showcase '96, Superboy Plus #1, Supergirl Plus #1, and Superman: The Man of Tomorrow #4 (ISBN 978-1779521743). A hardcover edition, due for release in December 2021, was never published.

== Reception ==
The book was critically praised. Later releases however, such as The Power of Shazam! Book Two: The Worm Turns, suffered a decline in sales. Some critics claim that The Power of Shazam! has received a lack of modern positive reception in part due to DC's avoidance towards reprinting the series.

== Awards ==
- The Power of Shazam! graphic novel won the Comics Buyer's Guide Fan Award for Favorite Original Graphic Album of 1994.
- Issue #1,000,000 of The Power of Shazam! was a part of the DC One Million storyline, which was a top votegetter for the Comics Buyer's Guide Fan Award for Favorite Story for 1999.
