= Mister Mind =

Fictional character from Fawcett and DC Comics

- Mister Mind as depicted in The Power of Shazam! #40 (1997). Art by Jerry Ordway.

Publication information
- Publisher: Fawcett Comics (1943–1945); DC Comics (1973–present)
- First appearance: Captain Marvel Adventures #26 (August 1943)
- Created by: Otto Binder (writer); C. C. Beck (artist)

In-story information
- Species: Venusian Mindworm; Magic Bookworm
- Place of origin: Venus
- Team affiliations: Monster Society of Evil; Underground Society
- Partnerships: Doctor Sivana
- Notable aliases: Hyperfly; Maxivermis Mind
- Abilities: Genius-level intellect and worm-like alien physiology; parthenogenesis, silk production, decelerated aging, biological possession, infection, and size alteration.; Vast Psionics: Telepathy, hypnosis, mind control, telekinesis, psi-energy absorption, mental linking, cyberpathy.; Expertise in magic: Pyrokinesis, photokinesis, remote possession.; As Hyperfly: Nigh-omnipotence, dimensional travel, reality consumption, space-time disruption.

Mister Mind is a supervillain appearing in American comic books published by DC Comics, primarily as an enemy of Captain Marvel (Shazam). Created by Otto Binder and C. C. Beck for Fawcett Comics, the character made a cameo appearance in Captain Marvel Adventures #22 (March 1943) before making his full first appearance in Captain Marvel Adventures #26 (August 1943). Mister Mind is a two-inch alien caterpillar-like being of high intelligence with telepathic powers who usually carries out his villainous plans through an organization called the Monster Society of Evil. The Society made its debut in Captain Marvel Adventures #22, and the resulting "Monster Society of Evil" story arc continued for two years in Captain Marvel Adventures, ending with issue #46 (May 1945).

Mister Mind appears in the DC Extended Universe films Shazam! and Shazam! Fury of the Gods, portrayed in CGI and voiced by director David F. Sandberg.

== Publication history ==
=== Fawcett Comics ===
After a brief appearance in issue #26, Mister Mind is eventually revealed in Captain Marvel Adventures #27 to be a cartoonish alien worm with spectacles and a talkbox around his neck to amplify his voice.

Despite his small size, Mister Mind continues to use his powers of intellect and telepathy to battle Captain Marvel in subsequent chapters of the serial, eventually recruiting numerous other allies ranging from Alligator-Men to Adolf Hitler and Benito Mussolini. "The Monster Society of Evil" serial concluded with Captain Marvel Adventures #46 (1945), in which Mind is captured and executed for crimes against humanity at the Nuremberg trials.

=== DC Comics ===
Fawcett ceased publication of Captain Marvel comics after settling a lawsuit from DC Comics in 1953. Twenty years later, DC acquired the rights to publish its own Captain Marvel stories under the title Shazam!, as well as the reprint rights to the Fawcett material. Mister Mind was reintroduced in a new story in Shazam! #2 (1973), which explained that he had survived his execution and hid while Captain Marvel and his allies were stuck in suspended animation for 20 years. Mister Mind would appear regularly as part of Captain Marvel's rogues gallery in his adventures in Shazam and World's Finest Comics through the 1970s and early 1980s. Mind also appeared, often with some form of the Monster Society of Evil, as a guest villain in other DC publications such as Justice League of America and DC Comics Presents. The final appearance of Mister Mind and the Monster Society of Evil in the original DC/Fawcett continuity was in All-Star Squadron #51–54 (November 1985 to February 1986), an arc written by Roy Thomas and his wife Dann that was chronologically Mind's first appearance and revealed the origin of his hatred of humanity and superheroes.

DC reset its comics' continuity with the 12-issue miniseries Crisis on Infinite Earths in 1985–86, and Mister Mind disappeared from DC publications for a decade. He re-emerged in The Power of Shazam! #13 (March 1996), now a more realistically depicted caterpillar-like being from the planet Venus possessing powers which include mind control, telepathy, and mental image projection. This Mind was the main villain of the second major story arc of The Power of Shazam!, and was depicted as the lead scout of Venusian worms looking to conquer the Earth. While Captain Marvel eventually destroys the other worms, Mind survives and becomes a recurring villain in The Power of Shazam!, JSA, and other DC publications, often forming a Monster Society of Evil to do his bidding as in the original serial. The weekly maxiseries 52 (2006-2007) featured Mister Mind as the series' final major adversary. In this story, he gains the ability to evolve into a gigantic "Hyperfly", able to eat space and time and inadvertently creating a new DC Multiverse in the process.

Following 52, Mind appeared irregularly as a supervillain in DC comic series such as Action Comics, Booster Gold, and more. In 2007, cartoonist Jeff Smith, the creator of Bone, wrote and illustrated a four-issue miniseries, Shazam! The Monster Society of Evil, which offered an updated take on the classic Fawcett story.

In 2011, DC again reset its continuity with The New 52. In subsequent stories, Mister Mind has appeared sparingly, mostly in cameo appearances as in Justice League #21 (2013) and Convergence: Shazam! #2 (2015). He appeared as one of the villains in DC's Shazam! ongoing comic series, with his first appearance in Shazam! #2 (March 2019).

== Fictional character biography (chronological) ==
=== Pre-Crisis ===
==== Earth-Two ====
Mister Mind came to Earth during World War II, drawn by its radio broadcasts; he especially loved Edgar Bergen's dummy Charlie McCarthy. Upon learning that his beloved Charlie was not real, he decided to conquer the world instead. To this end, he formed the first Monster Society of Evil, which was merely a shadow of what was to come. He gathered known villains like Dummy, Mister Who, Nyola, Oom the Mighty, and Ramulus to make up the Monster Society of Evil. They succeeded in capturing Hawkgirl. Not long after its founding, the other villains tried to kill him and Mister Mind retreated to Earth-S. Without his leadership, the team was quickly defeated in battle by the All-Star Squadron.

==== Captain Marvel Adventures: "The Monster Society of Evil" (Earth-S) ====
As a side-effect of the reality-altering Crisis on Infinite Earths, Mister Mind arrived in the universe of Earth-S (where Fawcett's former characters dwelled) sometime around 1846 (it was mentioned in this story that he had been working on a weapon for 97 years). His brilliant intellect, telepathic powers, and ruthlessness allowed him to conquer much of space, establishing bases on many different worlds as well as varied locations on Earth. He recruited supervillains, armies, and entire alien species to aid him in his attempt to conquer the Earth, and first relayed his information from the planetoid Punkus via radio. He began his reign of terror on Earth in 1943, boasting that he and the Monster Society of Evil would give Captain Marvel "nightmares from now on". This formed the basis of the plot for "The Monster Society of Evil" serial in Captain Marvel Adventures #22–46 (March 1943 to May 1945). Mind was not revealed as a worm until Captain Marvel Adventures #26.

Mind had many and varied plans to conquer Earth, and to destroy Captain Marvel or his teenaged alter-ego, Billy Batson. But Captain Marvel stopped all of Mind's plans, dismantled all of his resources, and arrested, frightened away, or accidentally killed all of his henchmen. Reverse cliffhangers were used in the Monster Society stories, such as Mister Mind about to be crushed under a careless heel or about to be crushed in a paper roller. Finally, a desperate Mister Mind attacked Captain Marvel's alter ego Billy Batson with ether and left him unconscious. But he then realized that without his henchmen, he was practically helpless and unable to kill him. Captain Marvel soon captured Mind and had him tried and executed for killing 186,744 people.

==== Shazam!: Return of the Society ====
Shazam! #2 was Mister Mind's first appearance in a DC comic, and depicted his return to villainy. Although he had been sentenced to death in the electric chair, Mind's alien physiology proved resistant to the high voltage, and he entered a state of suspended animation that was mistaken for death. On the verge of being stuffed for display in a museum, he awakened, hypnotized the taxidermist into creating a duplicate, and escaped.

Shortly after Captain Marvel's own return from suspended animation, he encountered Mister Mind trying to destroy the country with an expanding balloon-like weapon in St. Louis. With intelligence from a reformed Herkimer, Marvel succeeds in thwarting Mind's plan and capturing the worm.

Several future issues of Shazam! depict Mister Mind attempting to recruit new henchmen and reform the Monster Society of Evil, at one point even recruiting a displaced Lex Luthor from Earth-One. The Monster Society of Evil was briefly reformed in Shazam! #14 (September–October 1974).

An escaped Mister Mind, hungry for revenge, assembled a new, smaller group which included Doctor Sivana, his children Georgia and Sivana Jr, and Ibac. They attempted to attack the Marvel Family—Captain Marvel, Mary Marvel, and Captain Marvel Jr.—with a death ray that created "dream" monsters using first evil thoughts and later the nightmares of Uncle Marvel. The Marvels end up defeating the Monster Society by convincing Uncle Marvel to dream up "dream" versions of the Marvels to fight the monsters.

==== World's Finest Comics: The Monster Society Strikes Back ====
Mister Mind reformed his Monster Society of Evil one last time in the classic continuity, in World's Finest Comics #264–267 (August–September 1980 to February–March 1981). Almost the entire Marvel Family had to unite to stop them—Captain Marvel, Mary Marvel, Captain Marvel Jr., and the three Lieutenant Marvels: Tall Marvel, Fat Marvel, and Hill Marvel. Their wicked plans were wide-ranging, beginning with an assault on Egypt, expanding to a scheme to reverse the entire Earth's topography, Oggar raising an evil army from the sands and dusts of Egypt for Black Adam to lead, and conquering hundreds of planets and using them to build an army of spaceships. Their plans culminated in a massive assault on the Rock of Eternity, home of the Marvels' benefactor, the wizard Shazam. This was foiled, and Mister Mind was found hiding in Shazam's beard.

==== World's Funnest ====
In the Elseworlds story Superman & Batman: World's Funnest (November 2000), the two near-omnipotent imps Mister Mxyzptlk and Bat-Mite engage in a tremendous duel that destroys many planes of reality. One of these appears to be a version of Earth-S. During their time there, they run into a version of the Monster Society of Evil. Mxyzptlk easily destroys them along with the rest of the universe, but eventually restores it.

=== Post-Crisis ===
==== Shazam! A New Beginning ====
Mister Mind's return to the DC Universe in wake of Crisis was first hinted at in Roy Thomas' Shazam! A New Beginning. It closed with a defeated Dr. Sivana hiding out and drinking tequila in a Mexican dive bar. He ponders how he will defeat Captain Marvel when he sees a worm in the bottle and has the idea of using it as a weapon against the hero.

Thomas' idea of Mister Mind being a mutated tequila worm was not followed up on and he was given a different origin in his next appearance.

==== The Power of Shazam! ====
Mister Mind was fully re-introduced into the DC Universe in Jerry Ordway's The Power of Shazam! series in 1996. Mind was one of a race of mind-controlling worms from the planet Venus, who had plans to invade and take over the Earth, which they claim to have once ruled around the Ice Age. Appointed as the go-ahead agent, Mind arrived on Earth during World War II, by means of an indestructible space suit, but was captured by Bulletman, Starman, and Abin Sur before enacting his plan. Mind eventually escaped, stowing away on the Magellan space probe, and decades later forced Doctor Sivana to join forces with him, needing Sivana's scientific prowess to facilitate the Venusian worms' plans. He took control of the wealthy Sinclair Batson to finance those plans.

The worms' plans to invade the Earth were thwarted by Captain Marvel and Mary Marvel, who succeeded in killing all of the worms by sending them into deep space where they froze, save for Mister Mind, whom they placed in the custody of Sergeant Steel and the Department of Metahuman Affairs. Mind eventually escapes, takes over Steel's mind, and programs the robot Mister Atom, another Marvel Family villain in Steel's custody, to destroy the town of Fairfield, where Billy Batson (Captain Marvel) and Mary Bromfield (Mary Marvel) lived with their adopted parents. After Mister Atom's nuclear blast destroys the city and kills nearly all of its residents, the Marvels arrive in Washington, D.C. seeking revenge. Mister Mind's plot to set off a nuclear holocaust included using clones of himself to take over the minds of several regular American citizens, who were to make their ways to nuclear bomb facilities and initiate a nuclear holocaust. However, Mind's plan was foiled by the Marvel Family and Green Lanterns Kyle Rayner and Hal Jordan.

==== 52 ====
Mister Mind played an integral role in DC's year-long 2006-2007 weekly comic 52, although the importance of his role in the series was revealed gradually over time and involved the concepts of time travel and temporal paradoxes.

The day following the end of the Infinite Crisis event, Dr. Sivana discovers Mister Mind lying in a crater in the desert and pockets him, sealing him in a specimen jar and taking it back to his laboratory to prevent him from interfering with his plans to take over the world. Sivana bombards Mind with particles of Suspendium, a time-altering element introduced in the 1970s Shazam! title. Although Sivana is kidnapped by Intergang and forced to join their Science Squad, the Suspendium induces Mister Mind's delayed metamorphosis. As Sivana is dragged off, Mind observes a televised memorial for the heroes lost in Infinite Crisis and takes particular note of Skeets, the robotic companion of Booster Gold. With his metamorphosis beginning, Mind weaves a cocoon around himself, which doubles as a matter transporter that he uses to beam himself inside Skeets in Will Magnus' lab, intending to use the robot as a "cradle" where he can spend the following year gestating and completing his transformation.

Destroying Skeets from within, Mind adopts his identity and makes plans to consume the Multiverse, which was restored in Infinite Crisis. Discovering that Rip Hunter is aware of his plans, Mind, as Skeets, attempts to hunt him down and draw him out, to no avail. Eventually, he discovers Hunter hiding in the bottled city of Kandor, but when Hunter turns the Phantom Zone projector on him, Mind overpowers it and "eats" the Phantom Zone itself. At the end of the year, Mind tracks Hunter and Booster down to the lab of T. O. Morrow, intent on acquiring the head of the Red Tornado, whose computerized brain has mapped the Multiverse. There, Mind's gestation completes and he emerges from within Skeets in a monstrous imago form known as a "Hyperfly". Now, instead of feeding on the brainwaves of individuals, he feeds on space-time itself and decides to devour the entire Multiverse. Booster and Hunter flee back in time to the moment of the Multiverse's birth, with the now-gigantic Mind in pursuit, following them from universe to universe, where he consumes portions of each world's history, altering their timelines and creating 52 new, distinct Earths. Mind is lured back to Hunter's lab, where he shrinks in size and is trapped in Skeets' Suspendium-lined shell. Booster hurls Mind backwards through time, where the Suspendium reverts Mind back to his larval form, and lands on the day after the end of Infinite Crisis, where he is found by Sivana and sealed in the jar. The remaining 52 seconds of time are used to bind him in a time loop.

Also during the series, unrelated to Mind's activities, a new incarnation of the Monster Society was formed, consisting of the Four Horsemen of Apokolips, creatures engineered by Intergang's Science Squad (including Sivana). Of particular note is Sobek, a humanoid crocodile not unlike the beings who were members of the pre-Crisis Monster Society. This Monster Society attacked the Black Marvel Family for not joining the Freedom of Power treaty, and killed Isis and Osiris, only to be destroyed by Black Adam, save for Death, who flees. In his hunt for Death, Adam devastates the nation of Bialya, before defeating the final Horseman, torturing it for information, and killing it.

=== Shazam! The Monster Society of Evil (2007) ===
A new Captain Marvel prestige format four-issue limited series from DC Comics, Shazam! The Monster Society of Evil, written and illustrated by Jeff Smith began publication on February 7, 2007. Smith's Shazam! miniseries, in the works since 2003, is a more traditional take on the character, returning Captain Marvel to his roots with a story set outside of the DC Universe. In this version, Mister Mind resembles a small snake, with a more threatening face sans glasses, while wearing a modern style communicator headset. Many different monsters are shown in the Society, with the Crocodile-Men being replaced with the Alligator-Men.

=== The New 52 ===
In September 2011, The New 52 rebooted DC's continuity. In this new timeline, Mister Mind makes his first appearance after Doctor Sivana's alliance with Black Adam fails. Sivana heads to the Rock of Eternity, where he cannot get in because of a magical shield. He cries out for someone to help him save his family, saying that while science has failed them, magic could save them. Sivana then discovers a caterpillar-like creature trapped in a bottle within the Rock. The creature claims that people call him "Mister Mind" and makes note that he and Doctor Sivana shall be the "best of friends".

=== DC Rebirth ===
Mister Mind returns in the new Shazam! series during the "DC Rebirth," still in an alliance with Sivana. Residing inside of Sivana's ear, Mind has Sivana go to a doctor's office to cut out the tongue of a "medicine man" as it is needed for a spell. It is revealed that Mister Mind's real name is Maxivermis Mind and that he is believed to have originated from the Wildlands, one of the seven realms in the Magiclands. Mind suffered abuse as a child and tried for years to break into the Library of Eternity. He eventually succeeded and after absorbing all the knowledge and power of countless spells, he returned to the Wildlands and took his revenge on those who he believed had wronged him.

== Powers and abilities ==
Mister Mind originally possessed a high intellect in which made him among the greatest criminal masterminds in the DC Universe, could temporarily transfer his mind into others for a limited of time, and could also spin cocoons strong enough to bind and gag the Marvels to prevent them from speaking the magic word. Later appearances of the character describes them as a "telepath of the highest order" able to consume the thoughts of others, a vastly overpowered telekinetic who could belt a magical champion over great distances and is a powerful sorcerer in his own right as of recent publishing, having consumed spell books in the Rock of Eternity to gain their knowledge and power.

While very long-lived, Mister Mind's usual body is also only the larval stage of his breed. He briefly reaches maturity and evolves into the dreaded Hyperfly which can manipulate reality, feeds on the timelines of singular universes, and traverses space and dimensions with relative ease. After returning to his pupal stage, Mind retains the ability to reproduce asexually. He can also adjust his size and mass at will or psionically influence technology from galaxies far away.

== Other versions ==
- In Mark Waid and Alex Ross's 1996 miniseries Kingdom Come, Dr. Sivana was credited by Lex Luthor for creating a breed of mind-controlling worms before his death. Also in Superman's gulag, many of the prisoners were members of the Pre-Crisis Monster Societies, such as Jeepers, Mister Banjo, King Kull, the Crocodile Men, Ibac, and Goat-Man.
- In Jim Krueger, Doug Braithwaite and Alex Ross's series Justice, Dr. Sivana uses mind-controlling robots based on Mister Mind.

== In other media ==
=== Television ===
- Mister Mind appears in The Kid Super Power Hour with Shazam!, voiced by Alan Oppenheimer. This version possesses an inferiority complex as bigger villains never take him seriously.
- Mister Mind appears in Batman: The Brave and the Bold, voiced by Greg Ellis.
- Mister Mind appears in the "Shazam!" segment of DC Nation Shorts, voiced by Eric Bauza.
- Mister Mind appears in Justice League Action, voiced by Oliver Vaquer.
- Mister Mind appears in the Teen Titans Go! episode "Little Elvis", voiced by Scott Menville. He crash-lands on Earth to unleash the Seven Deadly Enemies of Man, but is defeated by Shazam by being thrown into Space.

=== Film ===
- Mister Mind appears in the DC Extended Universe (DCEU) film Shazam!, voiced by uncredited director David F. Sandberg. This version was initially imprisoned in the Rock of Eternity, before escaping during Thaddeus Sivana's attack on the wizard Shazam. In the mid-credits scene, he approaches an imprisoned Sivana to propose an alliance.
- Mister Mind appears in Lego DC Shazam! Magic and Monsters, voiced again by Greg Ellis. This version is the leader of the Monster Society of Evil who seeks to metamorphose into a giant moth.
- Mister Mind appears in the post-credits scene of the DCEU film Shazam! Fury of the Gods, voiced again by Sandberg. After disappearing for two years, he re-visits Sivana to enact his plans, only to leave again to complete another task.

=== Video games ===
Mister Mind appears as a character summon in Scribblenauts Unmasked: A DC Comics Adventure.
