= Monster Society of Evil =

Supervillain team

- Mister Mind showing a picture of Captain Marvel to his Monster Society of Evil. On the left from the top: Oggar, Mister Atom and Doctor Sivana. On the right from the top: Ibac, Black Adam, and King Kull. The first page of the 1980–1981 The Monster Society Strikes Back story arc. Art by Don Newton and Dave Hunt, lettering by Todd Klein, colors by Adrienne Roy, from World's Finest #264.

Publication information
- Publisher: Fawcett Comics (1943–1945); DC Comics (1973–present)
- First appearance: Cameo: Captain Marvel Adventures #22 (March 1943); Full appearance: Captain Marvel Adventures #26 (August 1943)
- Created by: Otto Binder; C. C. Beck

In-story information
- Base(s): None
- Member(s): Mister Mind; Captain Nazi; Ibac; Doctor Sivana; Black Adam; King Kull; Oggar; Mister Atom

The Monster Society of Evil is a supervillain team created by Otto Binder and C. C. Beck for Fawcett Comics. It is led by Mister Mind against their mutual enemy Captain Marvel. The team is significant as one of the first supervillain teams in comics to contain villains that a superhero had fought previously; prior to this, supervillain teams were composed of villains created just for that storyline. In fact, the Monster Society consists of every major enemy Captain Marvel had ever faced.

The Monster Society of Evil made its debut in Captain Marvel Adventures #22, and the resulting "Monster Society of Evil" story arc continued for two years in Captain Marvel Adventures, ending with issue #46 (May 1945).

== Publication history ==
=== Fawcett Comics ===
"The Monster Society of Evil" was published in 25 chapters in Fawcett Comics' Captain Marvel Adventures comic book. Its serialized format was inspired by the success of the live-action serial adaptation of the Captain Marvel strip, Adventures of Captain Marvel, by Republic Pictures in 1941. Chapter One of "The Monster Society of Evil" in Captain Marvel Adventures #22 (1943) depicted Captain Marvel learning that a criminal genius known only as "Mister Mind" - and only heard as a voice over a radio receiver - had gathered many of Marvel's other rogues - including Captain Nazi, Doctor Sivana, Ibac, Nippo, Mister Banjo, and more - to form "The Monster Society of Evil". After a brief appearance in issue #26, the mastermind Mister Mind is eventually revealed in Captain Marvel Adventures #27 to be a cartoonish alien worm with spectacles and a talkbox around his neck to amplify his voice.

"The Monster Society of Evil" serial concluded with Captain Marvel Adventures #46 (1945), in which Mind is finally captured, tried, and executed.

As the first and longest serialized story arc in comic book history, "The Monster Society of Evil" was hailed as a milestone of the Golden Age of Comics. Individual chapters would later be reprinted, after the Captain Marvel characters were acquired from Fawcett by DC Comics in 1972, in various collections under the trademark Shazam! In 1989, American Nostalgia Library reprinted the serial as The Monster Society of Evil – Deluxe Limited Collector's Edition. Compiled by Mike Higgs, the collection was an oversized, slipcased hardcover book strictly limited to 3,000 numbered copies.

== Fictional team history ==
=== Earth-Two version ===
When Mister Mind came to Earth-Two, he formed the first Monster Society of Evil, which was merely a shadow of what was to come. He gathered known villains like Dummy, Mister Who, Nyola, Oom the Mighty, and Ramulus to make up the Monster Society of Evil. They succeeded in capturing Hawkgirl. Not long after its founding, the other villains tried to kill him and Mister Mind retreated to Earth-S. Without his leadership, the team was quickly defeated in battle by the All-Star Squadron.

=== Earth-S versions ===
==== First Earth-S version ====
When Mister Mind was transported to Earth-S, recruited supervillains, armies, and entire alien species to aid him in his attempt to conquer the Earth, and first relayed his information from the planetoid Punkus via radio. He began his reign of terror on Earth in 1943, boasting that he and the Monster Society of Evil would give Captain Marvel "nightmares from now on". This formed the basis of the plot for "The Monster Society of Evil" serial in Captain Marvel Adventures #22–46 (March 1943 to May 1945). Mind was not revealed as a worm until Captain Marvel Adventures #26. Mind had many and varied plans to conquer Earth, and to destroy Captain Marvel or his teenaged alter-ego, Billy Batson. But Captain Marvel stopped all of Mind's plans, dismantled all of his resources, and arrested, frightened away, or accidentally killed all of his henchmen. Reverse cliffhangers were used in the Monster Society stories, such as Mind about to be crushed under a careless heel or about to be crushed in a paper roller. Finally, a desperate Mind attacked Captain Marvel's alter ego Billy Batson with ether and left him unconscious. He then realized that without his henchmen, he was practically helpless and unable to kill him. Captain Marvel soon captured the world's wickedest worm and had him tried and executed for killing 186,744 people.

==== Second Earth-S version ====
Mister Mind's alien physiology proved resistant to the high voltage, and he entered a state of suspended animation that was mistaken for death. On the verge of being stuffed for display in a museum, he awakened, hypnotized the taxidermist into creating a duplicate, and escaped. Several future issues of Shazam! depict Mind attempting to recruit new henchmen and reform the Monster Society of Evil, at one point even recruiting a displaced Lex Luthor from Earth-One. The Monster Society of Evil was briefly reformed in Shazam! #14 (September–October 1974).

An escaped Mister Mind, hungry for revenge, assembled a new, smaller group which included Doctor Sivana, his evil children Georgia and Sivana Jr, and Ibac. They attempted to attack the Marvel Family - Captain Marvel, Mary Marvel, and Captain Marvel Jr. - with a death ray that created "dream" monsters using first evil thoughts and later the nightmares of Uncle Marvel. The Marvels end up defeating the Monster Society by convincing Uncle Marvel to dream up "dream" versions of the Marvels to fight the monsters.

==== Third Earth-S version ====
Mister Mind reformed his Monster Society of Evil one last time in the classic continuity. Their wicked plans were wide-ranging, beginning with an assault on Egypt, expanding to a scheme to reverse the entire Earth's topography, Oggar raising an evil army from the sands and dusts of Egypt for Black Adam to lead, and conquering hundreds of planets and using them to build an army of spaceships. Their plans culminated in a massive assault on the Rock of Eternity, home of the Marvels' benefactor Shazam.

=== DC Rebirth version ===
In 2016, DC Comics implemented a relaunch of its books called "DC Rebirth" which restored its continuity to a form much as it was prior to "The New 52" reboot. The DC Rebirth version of the Monster Society of Evil consists of creatures from the Monsterlands who were recruited by Mister Mind and Doctor Sivana.

=== Dawn of DC version ===
In the "Dawn of DC", another incarnation of the Monster Society of Evil is seen. This consists of Mister Mind, Dr. Georgia Sivana, Evil Eye, Gorilla Ted, Herkimer, Jeepers and his kind, King Kull, Mister Atom, and Sabbac. With Mind using the body of Beck Geist, they disguise their organization as the Society in order to manipulate Freddy Freeman. It was also revealed that they also came across the Amber Lightning, which is testing Shazam and Freddy. Mind is revealed to have possessed Georgia and cloned himself, with one of his clones having obtained the Amber Lightning.

== Monster Society of Evil membership ==
=== First version ===
- Mister Mind (leader) – An alien worm with telepathic powers and a genius intellect.
- Dummy – A living ventriloquist dummy and enemy of Vigilante.
- Mister Who – A crippled criminal mastermind and early enemy of Doctor Fate. He created Solution Z, which grants him the abilities of shapeshifting, size-shifting, invisibility, regeneration, and intangibility.
- Nyola – A weather-controlling Aztec priestess who previously fought Hawkman.
- Oom the Mighty – A magical living statue and early enemy of the Spectre.
- Ramulus – A supervillain who can manipulate plants and is an early enemy of Sandman and Sandy the Golden Boy.

=== Second version ===
- Mister Mind (leader)
- Adolf Hitler – He and all the resources of Nazi Germany have assisted the Monster Society of Evil. Adolf Hitler was the one who gave the orders to create Captain Nazi.
- Archibald – A satyr and graduate of the Monster School who helped Mister Mind capture Billy Batson.
- An army of termites and worms.
- Artificial Bodies - Artificial bodies Mister Mind could mentally inhabit and which were used to fool Captain Marvel as he searched for Mind on his asteroid base,
  - Goat-Man – A humanoid goat creature who was the first recruit of the Monster Society of Evil.
  - A seemingly indestructible robot.
  - A giant purple octopus with a grinning human face.
  - A circus strongman with strength rivaling that of Captain Marvel himself.
- Benito Mussolini – He and all the resources of Fascist Italy have assisted the Monster Society of Evil.
- Bonzo – A hunchback human with large eyes and fangs.
- Captain Nazi – A Nazi super soldier who assisted in the first plot.
- Crocodile-Men – A species of humanoid crocodiles from the planetoid Punkus.
  - Herkimer – A Crocodile-Man who is Mister Mind's second-in-command. He later reforms and begins working in a circus.
  - Jorrk – A scientist and one of Mister Mind's lieutenants.
  - Sylvester – A Crocodile-Man and one of Mister Mind's preferred gunners.
- Dobbin – Mister Mind's seahorse steed.
- Dome Attendants – A group of creatures who tend to Mister Mind's undersea base. It consists of:
  - An unnamed Pig Man.
  - An unnamed Goblin.
  - An unnamed Werewolf.
  - An unnamed Ogre.
  - An unnamed midget submarine captain. The midget was the last of Mister Mind's minions to leave him.
- Dr. Smashi – A short Japanese scientist and one of Mister Mind's three lieutenants, alongside Jorrk and Herr Phoul.
- Dr. Hashi – A spiky-haired Japanese scientist.
- Dr. Peeyu – A tall Japanese scientist.
- Doctor Sivana – The "world's wickedest scientist".
- Evil Eye – A green-skinned humanoid monster with hypnosis.
- Herr Phoul – A bald Nazi scientist with a monocle and one of Mister Mind's three lieutenants alongside Jorkk and Dr. Smashi.
- Hideki Tojo – He and all the resources of Imperial Japan have assisted the Monster Society of Evil.
- Hydra – A serpentine monster created by Mister Mind.
- Ibac – A criminal who sold his soul to Lucifer for super-strength and durability, which he gets by saying the magic word "Ibac".
- Jeepers – The last of a race of bat monsters.
- Marmaduke – A criminal with big ears and a fat face.
- Monster Brigade – Oceanic monsters under Mister Mind's command consisting of:
  - A sperm whale.
  - A gigantic octopus.
  - A hammerhead shark.
  - A huge sea serpent.
- Monster School Professors – Teachers at Mister Mind's Monster School. It consists of:
  - An unnamed human.
  - An unnamed Crocodile-Man.
  - An unspecified fanged monster.
  - A humanoid with the head of a hippopotamus.
- Monster School Students – Pupils at the Monster School that consist of:
  - Unnamed tough humans
  - Unnamed Crocodile-Men.
  - A horned black demon.
- Mr. Banjo – A criminal and leaker of Allied secrets via coded music.
- Nippo – A master of disguise, master swordsman, and spy for the Japanese.
- Synthetic Animals – Fake animals created by Mister Mind. They consisted of
  - Oscar - A giant lobster.
  - Oliver - A gigantic octopus with human hands.
  - Ophelius - A huge ram.
  - Oliphant - A dragon.
- Tough Guys – Human enforcers of Mister Mind.
  - An unnamed Tommy-gun wielder.
  - An unnamed cloaked swordsman.
  - An unnamed beret-wearer.
  - An unnamed stereotypical "Goomba".
  - A Gatsby cap-wearer.

=== Third version ===
- Mister Mind (leader)
- Doctor Sivana
- Ibac
- Georgia Sivana – Sivana's youngest daughter.
- Thaddeus Sivana Jr. – Sivana's youngest son.

=== Fourth version ===
- Mister Mind (leader)
- Doctor Sivana
- Ibac
- Black Adam – A traitorous first of the Marvels with powers similar to the others, but from the Egyptian gods.
- King Kull – The last of the Beast-Men who ruled Earth before being overthrown. He has enormous strength and durability and a brilliant mind, along with bizarre technology.
- Mister Atom – An indestructible and super-strong genocidal robot who possesses the power of an atomic bomb.
- Oggar – An immortal sorcerer and former ally of the wizard Shazam.
- The inhabitants of 247 planets – Various alien species who the Society forced to work for them.

=== Fifth version ===
- Mister Mind (leader) - A worm from the Wildlands. He is revealed to be controlling C.C. Batson.
- Doctor Sivana - A mad scientist from the Earthlands.
- Crocodile-Men - A three-headed anthropomorphic crocodile from the Wildlands.
- Dummy - A man who was transformed into a living dummy and exiled to the Monsterlands following a fight with the "heroes of yesterday".
- Evil Eye - A tentacled monster from the Monsterlands.
- Jeepers - A bat monster from the Darklands.
- King Kull - The last of the Beast-Men from the Earthlands.
- Mister Atom - A giant robot from the Gamelands.
- Mister Merry-Go-Round - A villain from the Funlands.
- Red Queen - A queen in red from the Wozenderlands.
- Scapegoat - An anthropomorphic goat from the Wildlands. Killed by Superboy-Prime.
- Wicked Witch of the West - A witch from the Wozenderlands.

=== Sixth version ===
- Mister Mind (leader) -
- Beautia Sivana - The daughter of Doctor Sivana.
- Dr. Georgia Sivana - The scientific daughter of Doctor Sivana.
- Evil Eye II - A woman with bandages over her eyes that can bring her graffiti art to life.
- Gorilla Ted - A former Gorilla Militia member and astronaut from Gorilla City.
- Herkimer - A Crocodile-Man.
- Jeepers -
  - Jeepers' Race -
- King Kull -
  - Submen -
- Mister Atom - This version is a series of robots controlled by a man named Charles Langley.
- Sabbac - A demonic manifestation that works for the Seven Deadly Enemies of Man.

== The Secret Code of the Monster Society ==
"The Secret Code of the Monster Society" was frequently referred to in the comic book. As early as the Fawcett comic, readers could mail away for a decoder key for the Monster Society and read the secret messages in the book by translating the messages given to them according to the substitution cipher. The cipher is very basic, in that the ciphertext alphabet is actually the regular English alphabet backwards.

During The Power of Shazam! ongoing series in the 1990s, when Mister Mind and the Monster Society of Evil were re-introduced in Post-Crisis continuity, DC Comics had done a similar thing as readers could mail away for a decoder card for the "Venusian Language" and read the secret messages. Similar to Kryptonian and Interlac, this was a cipher based on an "alien" alphabet. Various alien characters in DC Comics have been seen using it since.

Jeff Smith used the original 1940s Monster Society code in his Shazam!: The Monster Society of Evil miniseries, even titling the miniseries' four chapters with ciphered text. DC Comics' official website provides an on-line tool to cipher and un-cipher the messages.

== Other versions ==
- An alternate universe iteration of the Monster Society of Evil from Earth-276 called the Monster League of Evil appears in Superman #276 (June 1974), consisting of Count Dracula, Frankenstein's monster, the Wolf-Man, and the Mummy. This version of the group are enemies of Captain Thunder.
- The pre-Crisis iteration of the Monster Society of Evil appears in Kingdom Come, consisting of Jeepers, Mister Banjo, King Kull, the Crocodile-Men, Ibac, and Goat-Man.

== In other media ==
- The Monster Society of Evil appears in the Batman: The Brave and the Bold episode "The Malicious Mister Mind!", consisting of Mister Mind, Doctor Sivana, Mister Atom, Kru'll the Eternal, Ibac, Jeepers, Oom the Mighty, and an unnamed Crocodile-Man.
- The Monster Society of Evil appears in Lego DC Shazam! Magic and Monsters, consisting of Mister Mind, Doctor Sivana, Oom the Mighty, an unnamed Crocodile-Man, Dummy, and Jeepers.
