= Ibac =

- Ibac as depicted in Shazam! #29 (June 1977). Art by Kurt Schaffenberger (penciller) and Vince Colletta (inker).

Publication information
- Publisher: Fawcett Comics (1942–1953); DC Comics (1973–present)
- First appearance: Captain Marvel Adventures #8 (1942, historical); The Power of Shazam! #1 (1995, canon)
- Created by: Otto Binder; C. C. Beck

In-story information
- Alter ego: Ibac I Ibac II; Stanley Printwhistle; Hamid Stanli
- Place of origin: Kahndaq (Ibac, Ibac II); United Kingdom (Hamid); Fawcett City (Stanley)
- Team affiliations: The Society; Monster Society of Evil; Circle of Crows
- Partnerships: Lady Blaze (Stanley); Oni Grace (Ibac/Hamid)
- Abilities: Possessing the traits of the worst villains in human history, Ibac is granted various supernatural powers in which includes superhuman strength, durability, and flight.

Ibac is a supervillain featured in American comic books published by Fawcett Comics and DC Comics. Primarily, versions of the character serve as parallels to Captain Marvel/Shazam and Black Adam, sharing significant histories with these characters and similar powers. The first version of the character is Stanley Printwhistle, a petty criminal who gains extraordinary abilities and transforms into "Ibac". In the original Fawcett Comics version, Ibac is empowered by Lucifer. However, following the events of Crisis on Infinite Earths, the character's powers are implied to be attributed to Blaze.

After Flashpoint, Ibac the First is revised as a warlord and slaver from Kahndaq who posed a significant threat to Black Adam during his time as a hero. Following his demise, the character's spirit is resurrected by the Circle of Crows, a group of witches and sorcerers who act as adversaries to both Adam and the wizard Shazam, representing contrasting forces. Empowered by the Circle of Crows, Ibac's abilities are derived from notorious tyrants. Eventually, the character's spirit is placed into Hamid Stanli, a young man of British descent.

== Publication history ==
Created by writer Otto Binder and artist C. C. Beck, Ibac first appeared in Captain Marvel Adventures #8 (March 6, 1942).

== Fictional character biography ==
=== Stanley Printwhistle ===
==== Fawcett Comics / Earth-S ====
Stanley "Stinky" Printwhistle, a crook who attempts to blow up a bridge, but is caught in the explosion and thrown off due to Captain Marvel. He is saved by Lucifer, who offers Printwhistle the chance to become a champion of evil and defeat Captain Marvel in exchange for his mortal soul. Printwhistle accepts, Lucifer summons up four historical villains, and Printwhistle is told to speak the magic word "IBAC". By doing so, he transforms into Ibac, a brutal muscleman with a buzz cut. Saying "IBAC" again transforms Ibac back into Printwhistle.

When he first appears he is defeated when Captain Marvel hits him so hard he seems to knock the evil power from him, in the form of leaving Printwhistle and the four other villains in front of him, the four fade away quietly, but Ibac later returns when the evil spirits contact him. Captain Marvel whirls Ibac around so fast that the four evil spirits separate from him. Because he has not been able to defeat Captain Marvel, Printwhistle has not been obliged to give his soul to the devil, and has reformed, but being weak-willed, he has often been forced by other criminals into becoming Ibac again.

In his first Silver Age appearance, the spirits of the villains who gave him his powers telepathically communicate with him, and force him to become Ibac as he has reformed and been a street sweeper for the last ten years. They order him to capture, then destroy, Billy. He succeeds in surprising, capturing, and leaving a bound and gagged Billy in a building about to be blown up, but Billy is able to use a recording of his voice to summon Captain Marvel and beat Ibac. After being defeated, his benefactors withdraw their powers from him. Ibac was a member of both the Monster Society of Evil during World War II, in which he nearly killed Billy in Africa after giving him bound and gagged to cannibals, and the Society formed years later.

While Captain Marvel is empowered by six mythological and Biblical figures, Ibac is empowered by four of the most evil and terrifying men to have ever walked the earth: the terror of Ivan the Terrible, the cunning of Cesare Borgia, the fierceness of Attila the Hun, and the cruelty of Caligula. While Captain Marvel transforms using magic lightning, Ibac's transformations are accomplished with magical green fire and brimstone.

When King Kull causes trouble for Earth-One, Earth-Two, and Earth-S, he enlists Ibac, Penguin of Earth-One, Queen Clea of Earth-Two, and Blockbuster of Earth-One for his attack on Earth-Two, where he tries to wreck Atlantis and use a cloud to sink islands. This brings them into conflict with Superman of Earth-One, Wonder Woman of Earth-Two, Green Arrow of Earth-One, and Spy Smasher of Earth-S. Spy Smasher battles Ibac and is on the verge of losing when he remembers what Captain Marvel told him of the villain. Spy Smasher then taunts the dim-witted villain by telling him to "back down". Ibac responds proudly "I back down for nobody!". The phonetic "I back" causes him to de-transform.

==== Post-Crisis ====
In post-Crisis continuity, Ibac's origin is similar to as his Earth-S counterpart although his power is implied to originate from Lady Blaze, his employer. Ibac also appears in Villains United during the Infinite Crisis storyline as a member of the Secret Society of Super Villains.

Ibac is seen among the captured villains in Salvation Run. There, he is in Camp Lex and starts an argument with the people that are not working to help build the machine they need to escape back to Earth. Ibac was also in the DC Holiday Special '09 issue fighting Captain Marvel once again, but in the spirit of the holiday, cease fighting and work together to rebuild what they destroyed during their brawl. Captain Marvel and Ibac later visit a soup kitchen in their human forms, with neither recognizing the other.

=== The New 52 ===
In 2011, The New 52 rebooted the DC universe. During the Forever Evil storyline, "Ibac the First" is depicted as an evil barbaric ruler who enslaved the Kahndaq people before being defeated and turned into stone by Black Adam whose family he murdered. Centuries later, one of his descendants takes the name of Ibac.

== Powers and abilities ==
=== Powers of Ibac ===
All iterations of Ibac possess a range of powers akin to those bestowed by the Powers of Shazam, which is retroactively revealed to be an attempted replication of the powers originating from the Wizard Shazam. Ibac possesses superhuman strength and durability, on par with that of Shazam/Captain Marvel and Black Adam. While it is unknown which trait assigns what power, Ibac has the traits of evil historical figures: the terror of Ivan the Terrible, the cunning of Cesare Borgia, the fierceness of Attila the Hun, and the cruelty of Caligula.

=== Ibac the First's abilities ===
In addition to the powers of Ibac granted to him by the Circle of Crows, the character is a skilled and ruthless warrior and general. He also uses the Lash of the Oppressor, a whip that can collect the Living Lightning and depower its users on contact.

== Other versions ==
- A descendant of the character, Ibac II, is the tyrannical ruler of Kahndaq before being killed by Black Adam.
- Hamid Stanli is a member of the Circle of Crows and the vessel for Ibac's spirit.

== In other media ==
- Ibac appears in The Kid Super Power Hour with Shazam! episode "Best Seller", voiced by an uncredited Lou Scheimer.
- Ibac makes a non-speaking appearance in the Batman: The Brave and the Bold episode "The Malicious Mr. Mind!" as a member of the Monster Society of Evil.
- Ibac appears in the DC Nation short "SHAZAM!: Courage", voiced by David Kaye.
- Ibac appears as a character summon in Scribblenauts Unmasked: A DC Comics Adventure.
