= Pete Costanza =

American comic book artist and illustrator

- Born: May 19, 1913 New York City, U.S.
- Died: June 28, 1984 (aged 71) Hackensack, New Jersey, U.S.
- Areas: Penciller, Artist, Inker

Pete Costanza (May 19, 1913 – June 28, 1984) was an American comic book artist and illustrator. He is best known for his work on Fawcett Comics' Captain Marvel and the Marvel Family during the World War II era fans and historians call the Golden Age of Comic Books, and served as one of Captain Marvel's longest-tenured artists.

== Biography ==
Costanza began his career at Fawcett during writer Bill Parker and artist C. C. Beck's initial planning and creation of Captain Marvel, later becoming Beck's chief assistant on that character, one of the era's most popular. When the character's original name of Captain Thunder was being changed, Costanza suggested "Captain Marvelous", which eventually became Captain Marvel. Costanza also co-created the Fawcett character Golden Arrow with Parker.

After Fawcett discontinued their line of comic books, Costanza freelanced for Gilberton's Classics Illustrated, adapting literary classics and historic events into single-issue comic-book narratives, as well as for Charlton Comics, the American Comics Group (ACG), for which he was widely known for his work on "Magicman" and "Forbidden Worlds," and the Standard/Nedor/Better umbrella of comics company.

In 1967, Otto Binder, a DC Comics writer and editor, recommended Costanza succeed Curt Swan as artist of the series Superman's Pal Jimmy Olsen. Over the next three years, until retiring due to a stroke in 1971, Costanza remained primarily on Jimmy Olsen while occasionally contributing to Adventure Comics, Superman, and World's Finest Comics. Retired after his stroke, which affected his right hand, Costanza taught himself to oil paint left-handed, and produced over 400 paintings of adventure, romance and Americana, many of which have been exhibited and sold.

Costanza married Yolanda Scarinci in 1941. They had two sons, Edward and Peter.
