= Scoop Smith =

Publication information
- Publisher: Fawcett Comics
- First appearance: Whiz Comics #2 (February 1940)
- Created by: Bill Parker (script); Greg Duncan

In-story information
- Alter ego: Robert Smith
- Abilities: None

Scoop Smith is a character who first appeared in Fawcett Comics' Whiz Comics #2 (Feb 1940). The character was created by Bill Parker and Greg Duncan.

Scoop is a crime-fighting news reporter, assisted by cameraman Blimp Black. According to Jess Nevins' Encyclopedia of Golden Age Superheroes, "he goes after mad scientists (Dr. Death), tracks down the explorer who discovered the Fountain of Youth, tracks down the Lost City of Scorpia, and goes after the Emperor of the Bahamas".
