= Seven Deadly Enemies of Man =

Fictional characters appearing in DC Comics

Publication information
- Publisher: Fawcett Comics (1939-1953); DC Comics (1972-present)
- First appearance: Whiz Comics #2 (February 1940)
- Created by: C.C. Beck; Bill Parker

In-story information
- Member(s): Pride; Envy; Greed; Wrath; Sloth; Gluttony; Lust

The Seven Deadly Enemies of Man (also known as the Seven Deadly Sins) are a group of demons appearing in American comic books published by DC Comics. Based on the Seven Deadly Sins, the group first appeared in Whiz Comics #2 (February 1940), and were created by writer Bill Parker and artist C.C. Beck.

The Seven Deadly Sins appear in the DC Extended Universe film Shazam!

== Fictional character biography ==
The Seven Deadly Sins are seven powerful demons, based upon the seven deadly sins enumerated in Christianity, who can take control of both humans and superheroes. The Sins were captured by the wizard Shazam many years ago, and encased in seven stone statues. The seven statues housing each demon are on display in Shazam's underground lair in the subway in the original comics, and in the Rock of Eternity in the modern comics. The demons have escaped their prisons several times to cause havoc, usually freed by another villain and often being reimprisoned by Captain Marvel.

In the original Fawcett Comics and pre-2000s DC Comics appearances, the Seven Sins were "censored" to an extent in keeping with comics standards. They were identified as the '"Seven Deadly Enemies of Man" and included Pride, Envy, Greed, Hatred, Laziness, Selfishness, and Injustice among their ranks. Most post-2000 appearances of the Seven Deadly Sins identify them by their traditional theological versions (Pride, Envy, Greed, Anger, Sloth, Gluttony, and Lust). In the current New 52/DC Rebirth continuity, the mythological figure Pandora was responsible for initially freeing the Sins in ancient times by opening what became known as Pandora's box.

== In other media ==
=== Television ===
- The Seven Deadly Enemies of Man appear in the Batman: The Brave and the Bold episode "The Power of Shazam!"
- The Seven Deadly Enemies of Man appear in the Teen Titans Go! episode "Little Elvis".

=== Film ===
- The Seven Deadly Sins appear in Superman/Shazam!: The Return of Black Adam.
- The Seven Deadly Sins appear in Lego DC Super Hero Girls: Super-Villain High, voiced by Fred Tatasciore.
- The Seven Deadly Sins appear in the DC Extended Universe (DCEU) film Shazam!, voiced by Steve Blum, Darin De Paul, and Fred Tatasciore. These versions possess differing demonic forms that reflect their namesakes.
- The Seven Deadly Sins make a minor appearance in the DCEU film Shazam! Fury of the Gods.

=== Video games ===
Wrath, Gluttony, Envy, and Pride appear as bosses and unlockable playable characters in Lego DC Super-Villains as part of the "Shazam! Movie DLC" pack.
