= King Kull (DC Comics) =

- King Kull battling the Justice League, the Justice Society, and Shazam's Squadron of Justice on the cover of Justice League of America #135; art by Ernie Chan.

Publication information
- Publisher: Fawcett Comics (1951–1953); DC Comics (1976–present)
- First appearance: Captain Marvel Adventures #125 (October 1951)
- Created by: Otto Binder; C. C. Beck

In-story information
- Full name: Kull
- Species: Subman
- Team affiliations: Monster Society of Evil
- Notable aliases: The Beastman; The Beast Man
- Abilities: Superhuman strength, stamina, and durability; Genius-level intellect; Basic combat skills

King Kull (also known as the Beastman or the Beast Man) is a fictional character appearing in American comic books published originally by Fawcett Comics and currently by DC Comics. Created by Otto Binder and C. C. Beck, he originally first appeared in Fawcett Comics’ Captain Marvel Adventures in October 1951, and appeared from then until 1953 when the company ceased publishing its superhero titles. DC later acquired Fawcett's properties, and revived the character in the 1970s.

== Publication history ==
Created by writer Otto Binder and artist C. C. Beck, King Kull's first appearance was in Captain Marvel Adventures #125 (cover-dated October 1951). King Kull appeared in adventures of Captain Marvel during the 1950s and the period in which DC Comics revived the hero during the 1970s.

== Fictional character biography ==
According to one account, King Kull is ruler of the Submen (also called Beast-Men), a brutish but technologically advanced race who ruled humanity until they were overthrown in a revolt, as the humans vastly outnumbered them and killed all the other Beast-Men. Kull fakes his death with a bomb and survives until the 20th century in suspended animation in a cavern, then awakens due to an earthquake and repeatedly threatens the human-dominated modern world with his immense strength, durability, and technology. However, other versions claim he emerged throughout human history and attempted to stop the spread of democracy, and is apparently the basis for the Bogeyman and other mythical monsters.

He is usually thwarted by Captain Marvel or the Marvel Family. On one occasion, he collaborated with Doctor Sivana. On another occasion, he released the Seven Deadly Enemies of Man and used Sin bombs to try destroying the world. King Kull once tried to turn Billy to stone.

One particularly well-planned escapade requires the efforts of the Justice League of America and the Justice Society of America (in one of their dimension-crossing team-ups, which DC produced annually from the mid-1960s to the mid-1980s), as well as a group of heroes of Captain Marvel and King Kull's home universe of Earth-S, referred to unofficially as the Squadron of Justice. Kull has captured both the wizard Shazam who grants the Marvel Family's powers and the ancient gods and goddesses the powers are drawn from after gaining access to the Rock of Eternity with a faster-than-light ship, paralyzing them with a device that slowed down their impulses, except for Mercury, who was able to get away in time; after Shazam makes telepathic communication with him he warns other heroes from the three Earths about Kull. Johnny Thunder's Thunderbolt helps the Marvels get their powers back in the final issue and transports them to the Rock of Eternity. Kull recruits the aid of villains from the three Earths to cause havoc. They are all defeated, and the heroes then head to the Rock of Eternity, with Superman leading the attack. Kull is imprisoned with magic chains that supposedly even Hercules cannot break, and the heroes return to their own worlds.

Following the events of Crisis on Infinite Earths, Kull does not appear for many years. He makes his first appearance in over 20 years in Justice League: Cry For Justice, where he battles Stargirl and Cyclone as part of a massive plot by Prometheus to distract Earth's superheroes so that he can plant massive teleportation devices in various cities.

In the "DC Rebirth" relaunch, King Kull originates from the Earthlands and is a member of the Monster Society of Evil. He states that his species used to rule the Earthlands. In the "Dawn of DC" initiative, Kull is given a vastly different design, having pointed ears, fangs, and claws, while his Submen are smaller, scrawnier, and gray-furred.

== Powers and abilities ==
King Kull has enhanced strength, stamina, and durability. He possesses superhuman intelligence and is an expert at unarmed combat. He additionally has access to an advanced airship.

== Other versions ==
King Kull appears in Billy Batson and the Magic of Shazam! #6.

== In other media ==
A character partially inspired by King Kull named Kru'll the Eternal appears in Batman: The Brave and the Bold, voiced by Michael Dorn. Following his introduction in the episode "Menace of the Conqueror Caveman!", he joins the Monster Society of Evil in the episode "The Malicious Mr. Mind!".
