= Mamaragan =

Australian Aboriginal god of lightning

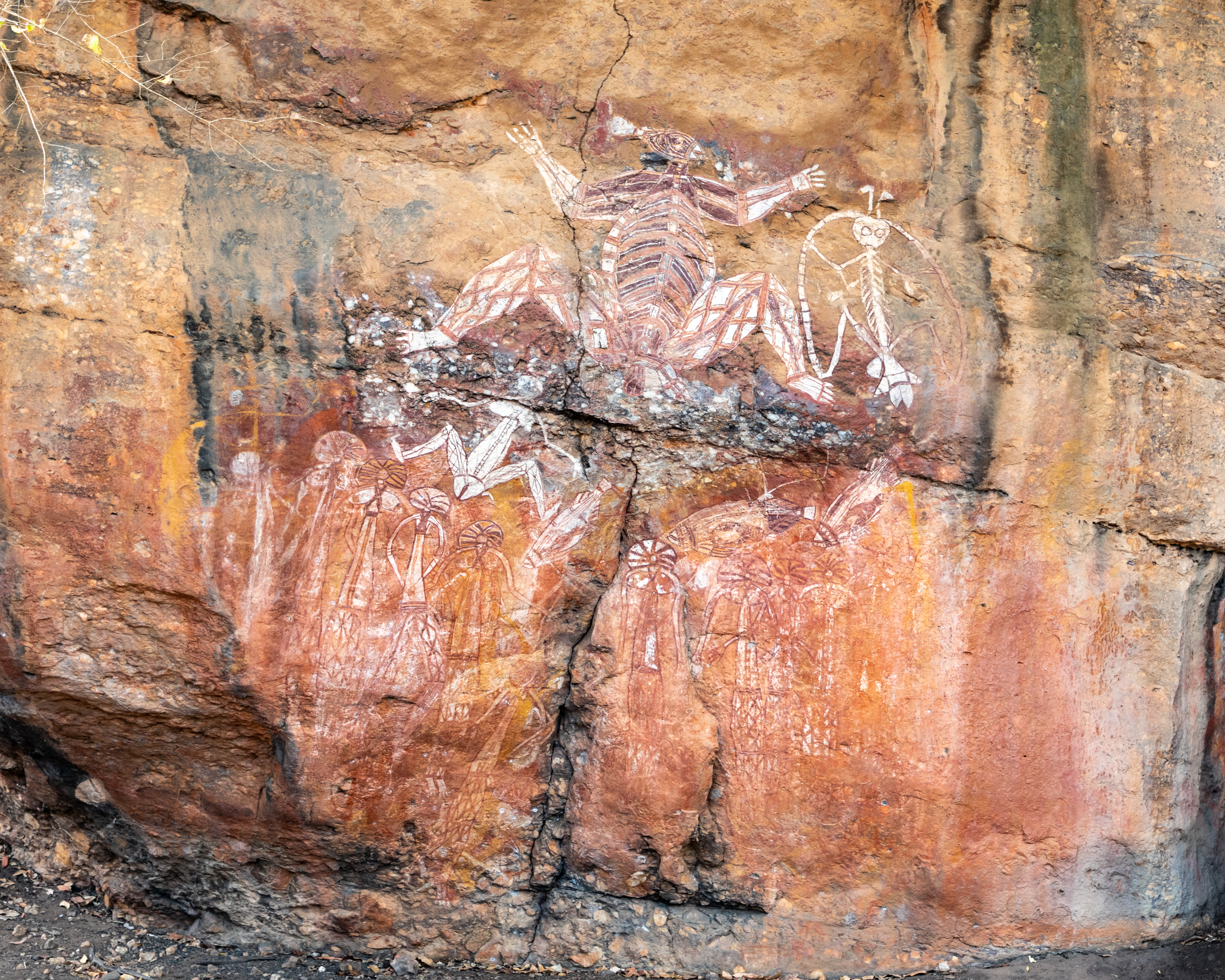
A rock art of Mamaragan/Namarrkon (upper right) in Kakadu National Park.

In Australian Aboriginal mythology (specifically Kunwinjku), Mamaragan or Namarrkon is a lightning Ancestral Being who speaks with thunder as his voice. He rides a storm-cloud and throws lightning bolts to humans and trees. He lives in a Billabong.

== Characteristics and appearance ==
Namarrkon is the lightning man. Namarrkon soaks up the sun's rays, which form bright arcs of light across each of his shoulders. He is mostly unseen, living high in the sky and riding storm clouds. He makes thunderous sounds by striking the clouds with stone axes fixed to his head, elbows, and knees.

He appears each year in Kunumeleng, pre-monsoon season, reminding people of the consequences of invoking the spiritual power. If people disobey the law, Namarrkon hisses, crackles, and even strikes the offender with his fiery spears of lightning.

The people of Arnhem Land consider Leichhardt's grasshopper to be the children of Namarrkon. The brightly coloured insect appears during the buildup season, (or the more specific Kunmeleng or its equivalent). It is believed to bring the lightning by calling to its father, who answers with powerful storms. There are sacred stories associated with this.

== Actions during ancient climate change ==
The climate changed nearly 7,000 years ago, causing the ice caps to melt and sea levels to rise. During this period, Namarrkon created violent thunderstorms in preparation for the Wet Season rains brought by the Rainbow Serpent.

== Dreaming site ==
During the dry season, Namarrkon lives in a billabong not far from Numbuwah, a sacred rock in Western Arnhem Land. Namarrkon's dreaming site (djadjan) is a slight projection in the outline of the Arnhem Land escarpment. It consists of three fused pillars, one with a circular hole near the top. This is a few km northeast of the Nourlangie Rock tourist site to the east of Koongarra saddle. Namarggon left one eye (the hole) to watch for the monsoon, but also to watch his estranged wife, whose home is a cave in a pillar near Koongarra. Namarrkondjadjan is well-named, as the promontory creates the earliest intense lightning storms.

== In Aboriginal art ==
Namarrkon is depicted in Arnhem land Rock art with the best known depiction being at Nourlangie rock. This spirit was also depicted by numerous aboriginal artists on bark paintings including Lofty Nadjamerrek, Nadjombolmi, and Mick Kubarkku. He is depicted with stone axes on his elbows or knees and lightning surrounding his body. Only certain artists who have the right to this dreaming may paint depictions of this spirit.

== In popular culture ==
The character has been adapted or mentioned in some media; in DC Comics, the Wizard Shazam's revised backstory is revealed during "Darkseid War", revealing his true name to be Mamaragan. He is responsible for empowering both Black Adam and Shazam as his champions. In One Piece, Eneru uses an attack called Mamaragan in an attempt to destroy Skypiea.
