= Wizard Shazam =

- The current incarnation (Mamaragan) of the Shazam character. Art by Alitha Martinez (penciler), Mark Morales, John Livesay (inkers), and Alex Guimarães (colorist)

Publication information
- Publisher: Fawcett Comics (1942–1953); DC Comics (1972–present)
- First appearance: Whiz Comics #2 (February 1940)
- Created by: C. C. Beck; Bill Parker

In-story information
- Alter ego: Mamaragan (current); Jebediah (original)
- Species: Deity (current); New God (former); Homo Magi (former)
- Team affiliations: Marvel Family; Squadron of Justice; The Quintessence; Council of Immortals; Lords of Chaos and Order; Council of Eternity
- Partnerships: Black Adam; Shazam (Billy Batson); Mary Marvel
- Supporting character of: Shazam (Billy Batson); Black Adam
- Notable aliases: The Wizard, Wizard of Shazam, Jebediah O'Keenan, The Champion, The Great Wizard
- Abilities: Immortality; Mastery of magic and occultism; Reality manipulation; Divine empowerment

The Wizard Shazam, also known as Shazam (/ʃəˈzæm/) or The Wizard, is a fictional character appearing in American comic books published by Fawcett Comics and DC Comics, first appearing in Whiz Comics #2 (February, 1940) created by C.C. Beck and Bill Parker. A major supporting character in Shazam!-related comic book titles, he often serves as a wise old man archetype who empowers champions to fight evil.

The original version of the character was Jebediah, a young boy of Egyptian and Canaanite origin who served as the Champion, gaining his power through Canaanite gods. In his later years, he forgoes their powers and learned magic before seeking a successor to empower. A revised version of the character is introduced after The New 52. At first introduced as a Kahndaq native who ascended to godhood, this origin was retconned and he is revealed to be Mamaragan, a figure based upon the deity in Kunwinjku culture. This version served as an adjudicator on Earth's supernatural matters as leader of a cabal of six other wizards, making up the Council of Eternity until a betrayal forces him to seek a successor to both his power and that of the fallen Council. Although the characters' motivations and background histories differ, they are intended to be the same character.

The character is an ancient sorcerer who battled the forces of evil for centuries until the betrayal of Black Adam, one of his earliest champions and proposed successors. Shazam was forced to magically imprison Adam and seek another champion to take his place. This would eventually come in the form of Billy Batson, who becomes the hero known as Captain Marvel (later also known as Shazam) and subsequently the rest of the Marvel Family (currently known as the Shazam Family). He often serves as a mentor to the group and is a notable member of the Quintessence, a powerful group of beings who watch over events unfolding in the universe.

The Shazam character has been featured in various media. The original Golden Age incarnation appeared in the live action serial, Adventures of Captain Marvel, portrayed by Nigel De Brulier. He also appeared in animated features such as Superman/Shazam!: The Return of Black Adam, voiced by James Garner. Djimon Hounsou portrayed the character in DC Extended Universe films Shazam! (2019), Black Adam (2022), and Shazam! Fury of the Gods (2023), in which the character's appearance and portrayal is inspired by his The New 52 incarnation.

== Publication history ==
Created in the 1940s by Bill Parker and C. C. Beck for Fawcett Comics, he is an ancient wizard (Whiz Comics #2 gives his age as 3,000 years) who gives young Billy Batson the power to transform into Captain Marvel. Despite the new comic's popularity and theatrical success, Captain Marvel was similar enough to Superman that a court ruled against Fawcett in 1952. Two decades after gaining the rights to Captain Marvel, DC Comics began publishing new stories under the title Shazam!. This became a problem for DC's lawyers, as the company had abandoned any rights to the Captain Marvel name, and it was now owned by rival Marvel Comics.

While not part of the first wave of DC's The New 52 2011 line wide relaunch, it was announced at New York Comic Con on October 15, 2011, that Billy Batson would be featured in a backup story, "The Curse of Shazam!" beginning in Justice League (vol. 2) #7 in March 2012. It was confirmed by Geoff Johns, DC Comics' chief creative officer and the author of the story, that Billy Batson's alter ego would be called "Shazam" rather than "Captain Marvel" from now on. In DC's, 2012 Free Comic Book Day offering called The New 52 FCBD Special #1, it was revealed that seven wizards representing seven different mythologies occupied the Rock of Eternity at the dawn of time in The New 52. They harnessed the power of magic to cast out a "Trinity of Sin", which acted as a precursor to the 2013 Trinity War crossover event. A younger version of the Wizard is part of this group of wizards.

Both the wizard and his champion shared the name "Shazam" in the comic book stories published from then until June 2013. The Wizard later revealed that "Shazam" is an adopted name, and that his original name is Mamaragan.

== Characterization ==
=== Fictional character biography ===
==== Golden Age (1942–2011) ====
Rendition of the Jebediah incarnation of the Wizard. Art by Alex Ross.

The Wizard Shazam had several revisions to his background; In his Fawcett Comics' background, the Wizard Shazam was an Egyptian wizard whom has fought evil for centuries and his magic name was originally "Shazamo", an acronym for the gods who supported him (Solomon, Hercules, Atlas, Zeus, Achilles, Mercury, and Oggar). After Oggar turned to evil, he was cast out of the Wizard's elders, dropping the "O" and making the wizard's name "Shazam".

Since his character's merger into DC Comics, he has several revisions; he is instead was a young orphaned boy named Jebediah born over 9,000 years ago in Canaan who was empowered by the gods to fight the forces of evil, taking the name "Champion". As Champion, Jebediah faced many evil foes and the most dangerous was the Three Faces of Evil, a three-headed demonic dragon (named Terror, Sin, and Wickedness) who comes to be sealed away (or defeated via a time travel account with aid from the future Captain Marvel) by Jebediah. He also fathered Blaze and Satanus through a hellhound demoness who assumed a human form to seduce the young Jebediah, a mother of the Three Faces of Evil, and would raise the twins away from their father.

Centuries later during the 19th Dynasty of Egypt (1295 - 1186BC), now known as "Shazam", he seeks a young successor and meets various beings his journeys, with Solomon being the most favored one due to his kindness and relative progressive attitude. After encountering Teth-Adam as a famous wizard in Egypt, he makes him his champion with intent to draw power from the Greek/Roman immortals and Solomon (having gathered essence of their power in preparation) but instead was empowered by Egyptian sources due to Blaze's interference and when his champion proves corrupted centuries later by killing the reigning Pharaoh, he is forced to deal with his (either by him banishing him to the furthest star and is condemned as "Khem-Adam" (Black Adam) or is imprisoned his power and soul into a magical scarab). During the 18th Dynasty of Egypt, he would make Queen Pharaoh Hatshepsut one of his champions known as "Isis" based upon the aforementioned Egyptian deity, whose powers are granted through an amulet. Upon her death, the amulet was returned to him and he hoped to one day find a worthy successor. Eventually in the early 20th century, he resurrects Ibis the Invincible and his wife to aid the effort in World War II alongside other heroes, battled his own daughter once more who posed as Fawcett City's most prominent mob boss after he becomes attached to the city, and suffered amnesia upon being struck in the head until his memories was restored by C.C Batson, whom he once met before. Finding him kind and compassionate, he originally sought to empower him as his champion but he is killed before he could do so, murdered by Theo Adam (a descendant of Black Adam possessed by his ancestor). He decides to enlist C.C. Batson's young son, Billy, as the successor to his power.

Years into aiding Billy Batson and the Marvel Family, Shazam summons the Spectre to free Superman from Eclipso's control. This unwittingly breaks a covenant between the spirits and sets him at odds with Eclipso, who later possesses Jean Loring and corrupts the Spectre. While Shazam matches the Spectre for a time drawing power from his artifacts in the Rock of Eternity, the Spectre drains his power in a counterattack and kills him, destroying the Rock of Eternity and freeing the Seven Deadly Sins.

When the Rock of Eternity is rebuilt, Billy Batson is chosen as the next successor of the wizard's role in caretaking the Rock of Eternity. The Wizard would later reappear as a statue in the Rock of Finality. With the aid of C. C Batson's spirit, Jay Garrick, and a reluctant Black Adam enacted a plot to "cleanse" the Earth, the Wizard is revived but de-powers Adam and Isis while disowning Billy and Mary Batson in apparent disappointment, disappearing after making it clear he will also confront Freddy Freeman (whose power as "Captain Marvel" is derived from alternative sources).

==== Modern (2012–present) ====
The Wizard, as seen in Justice League (vol. 2) #0 (November 2012). Art by Gary Frank.

Following the New 52, the character's background features heavy revisions; originally, his background was that of a Kahndaqi wizard who ascended into godhood but this background was a falsified one. His true origin entails him as Mamaragan, a Kunwinjku deity whose songlines guided him to a seat on the Circle of Eternity, where he adopted the title of "Wizard" and the magical name "Shazam" respectively. During his time in the Circle of Eternity, Mamaragan led the council in punishing the Phantom Stranger (an adaptation of Judas Iscariot) for his betrayal of Jesus Christ on behalf of God, Pandora, and the Question (an adaptation of Narcissus). Mamaragan also fathered demonic twins (Blaze and Satanus) and once aided fellow Lords of Chaos and Order in deposing Xanadoth in a time frame long before empowering his own champions.

At around 26th century BC in ancient Egypt (about during the Fourth Dynasty), Mamaragan empowered a young Egyptian boy, Aman, as his champion, who would then share his power with fellow slave and uncle, Teth-Adam (Mighty Adam). Mighty Adam later secretly killed his nephew to consolidate his power into his own, becoming his primary champion. Adjacent to this timeframe, Mamaragan and the Circle also oversaw the Seven Magiclands and had enlisted the aid of Solomon, Hercules, Atlas, Zeus, Achilles, and Mercury to battle Mister Mind and his Monster Society of Evil, culminating in Solomon's apparent death and the entrances to the realms being sealed off. Centuries later, he betrays Mamaragan and the Council, sedating his former mentor with arcane potion to keep his power and prestige while hiding him away. In 24th century BC, he is helped by slaver Ibac, whom alongside the Circle of Crows (a dark analogue of the Circle of Eternity), sought to depose Black Adam using the Wizard. He confronts Teth Adam, confirming having always been suspicious of Aman's true fate and condemns him as Khem-Adam (Black Adam) before defeating him by either sealing him away or banishing him to the furthest star. Within his account of being sealed away, in the 10th century, Mamaragan briefly recalls his decisions upon Hippolyta and Viking Prince's request to have Adam aid in stopping the Frost King before he is sealed away once more. In the alternate account of being sent from the furthest star, the Wizard's actions on Adam unwittingly created a new incarnation of deities based around ancient Mespotamian deities.

In the modern era, the wizard becomes more desperate in choosing a successor, having sensed the eventual return of Teth. Setting his affairs straight, he apologized to Pandora for giving a harsh judgment and settles for Billy Batson; one account has him reluctant choose an abrasive and ill-mannered Billy due to seeing potential and his hidden kindness and passes his power upon him before dying. Another account has him reluctant again but with a far less ill-mannered Billy, who in turned, questions Mamaragan's character. He returns to life shortly after Darkseid's supposed death, which disrupted Billy's connections to his old gods, and worked to grant him a new pantheon. He enlist Billy's aid when he comes into conflict with Yuga Khan (the father of Darkseid) when he wishes to usurp the powers of Shazam. After his defeat, the wizard makes him part of Billy's new pantheon as penance for his crimes and reveals his aboriginal ties and being among Billy's new set of empowered gods. He also joined the Council of Immortals for a time. When the Shazam Family open the Seven Magiclands once more, he reveals himself once more and the family later doubt his allegiance following accepting C.C Batson as the seventh champion. However, it is revealed Mister Mind used C.C as a new host to confer the Wizard's powers and plotted the re-emergence of the Monster Society of Evil. The Shazam Family manages to defeat the Society, Mind, and surprise adversary Superboy-Prime and Mamaragan prophesied a redeemed Black Adam as the eventual seventh champion.

Sometime during the Infinite Frontier era, Mamaragan is a member of the Quintessence; they would ask Wonder Woman to join their ranks but she is rejected and shortly later, they are seemingly killed by an empowered Darkseid. The Quintessence were under the control of a fraction of the Great Darkness controlled by Pariah and are eventually restored. Mamaragan is unexpectedly ousted from his role as Keeper of the Rock of Eternity following changes in magic due to the Lazarus eruption, and joins Hera's cause in re-claiming divine power from mortals. He aids her in killing Zeus and de-powers Billy. He reclines his support of Hera when her agenda proves too volatile and re-empowers Billy while Mary is supported instead by Hipployta.

=== Description ===
A major supporting character in Shazam comic book titles, the character is an ancient wizard who bestows magical powers onto select champions and is a defender against evil. Often advising the Marvel Family, the characters also possess a dynamic with Billy Batson as a parental figure, either posing as his maternal grandfather (Jebediah O'Keenan in stories prior to the New 52) to allow a dual life with parental guidance or as a father figure alongside Rosa and Victor Vasquez. Among the members of the Quintessence, he is stated to be among the few characters capable of contending (and killing) Darkseid.

The modern and golden age versions differ in appearance and background but share much of the same history. The older version is depicted as a lighter-skinned man of Egyptian and Caananite origins. This version would eventually ascended into godhood due to his powers in magic. Alternatively, he has also become a New God and is described as a Lord of Order. The modern version is an adaptation of Mamaragan, the aboriginal god of lightning with dark skin and Aboriginal Australian (Kunwinjku) origin, and a more benevolent Lord of Chaos.

=== Powers and abilities ===
The Wizard Shazam vast magical powers that manifest in a lightning theme, which includes reality alteration. He is also deity whose power "transcends" conventional notions of space-time, allowing him and multiple versions of himself to simultaneous exist across the multiverse as a singular being. His primary powers has been retroactively attributed the Living Lightning (since 2012 onwards), a magical force intrinsically tied to his life force and allows for a variety of magical abilities for himself and those empowered as his champions such as generate and control lightning, spell-casting, enhance the power of other's spells, enhance strength, and other healing abilities. Chiefly, the Wizard Shazam most renowned powers are the Powers of Shazam, a set of superpowers acquired from aspects of different divine entities and notable figure (from myth, folklore, and/or original creations within the DC Universe) whose names align with the "SHAZAM" acronym. They have the ability to grant power to a chosen champion, whether willingly or under the coercion of the Wizard. When a champion is empowered, the associated divine entities are bound by specific parameters and rules that govern their connection to the champion. In order to deter people usurping his powers, the magic also has safeguards that results in a slow demise of those who manage to steal its powers while in use. A creator of weaponry, among his weaponry is a magical staff (Staff of the Living Lightning) acting as a focal point for his powers akin to a lightning rod but it does not possess the Powers of Shazam. He also possess a magical dagger able to kill gods such as Zeus.

In prior stories involving the Golden Age version, Shazam possesses similarly vast magical powers but are attributed differently; in a diminished state, he is limited to utilizing thunderbolts and spiritually advising the Shazam Family. Both the Powers of Shazam alongside his own magical abilities were attributed to a font of power only referred to as the Living Magic. In his younger years as the Champion, he possess powers akin to his future successors: these abilities were utilized by speaking the magic word ("VLAREM"), allowing him to transform from a youth into a demigod-like adult form. These powers granting him the strength of Voldar, wisdom of Lumian, speed of Ariel, power of Ribavel, courage of Elbiam, and stamina of Marzosh. While the exact extent of these abilities are unknown, these powers at least grant him superhuman strength, speed, stamina, flight, and other unknown magical abilities.

== Other versions ==
- In the 2025 Marvel/DC Thor/Shazam Infinity Comic crossover, the Wizard Shazam appears alongside Shazam (known as Captain Marvel in the story) based upon his modern version. He transports Thor to the Rock of Eternity to aid him and Captain Marvel in battling Mister Mind, who usurped various powers from demonic and godlike beings from both the Marvel and DC Multiverse aligning with an anagram from his name similar to Captain Marvel's own. Eventually, Thor and Captain Marvel managed to defeat him and the Wizard Shazam reverses his powers.
- In the Kingdom Come reality, Shazam is a member of the Quintessence and has been displeased that Billy Batson has been corrupted by Lex Luthor's influence.
- In the Flashpoint timeline, the power of the six Elders is divided up between six children who say Shazam together to transform into Captain Thunder, similar to the Lieutenant Marvels. They claim to have gotten on the subway car to Shazam's lair.

=== Marvel (Billy Batson) ===
Portion of a panel from The Trials of Shazam #2 (November 2006) featuring Marvel. Art by Howard Porter.

After the events of Infinite Crisis, Billy assumes the role of the wizard Shazam, now known as Marvel, while Freddy Freeman, without powers, attempts to prove himself worthy of the Shazam powers and becomes the new Captain Marvel. Mary loses her powers and falls into a coma but later accepts power from Black Adam. In this new incarnation, Shazam resembles the original Captain Marvel, with only having long, white hair.

During the Trials of Shazam!, Sabina gains some Powers of Shazam with the help of the Council of Merlin. She kills Atlas, leading Freddy and Marvel to temporarily shoulder Atlas's burden. Freddy convinces Apollo to take on Atlas's burden, but Apollo shares his powers with Freddy and Sabina out of bitterness. Sabina and the Council of Merlin plot to assault New York City to disrupt the magical balance. The Justice League intervenes, and Freddy battles Sabina. Freddy sacrifices himself and is deemed the most worthy by Zeus, who grants him the full power of Shazam. Sabina is killed, and the demons disappear. Later, Black Adam, Isis, and the corrupted Mary Marvel take control of the Rock of Eternity. Billy and Mary's father recruits Jay Garrick to retrieve Shazam's spirit from the Rock of Finality. Shazam is restored, removes powers from Isis and the Marvels, and turns Adam and Adrianna to stone. Shazam cuts off Billy and Mary's access to his power and mentions dealing with Freddy before closing the Rock of Eternity.

== Cultural impact and reception ==
The Wizard Shazam has been subjected to several literary analysis. In Captain Marvel and the Art of Nostalgia, Cremin analyzes the Wizard Shazam's meeting with Billy as an important narrative moment and considers him a key character due to his magical knowledge and wisdom. One study analysed the character through comparisons of the Oedipus myth, interpreting both his comic and serial film versions with the wizard passing his powers to Billy as a representation of an elder passing cultural responsibility to the next generation.

== In other media ==
=== Television ===
- Shazam appears in The Kid Super Power Hour with Shazam!, voiced by Alan Oppenheimer.
- Shazam appears in the Batman: The Brave and the Bold episode "The Power of Shazam!", voiced by Jim Piddock.
- Shazam (referred to as "The Wizard") appears in the Justice League Action episode "Classic Rock", voiced by Carl Reiner.
- Shazam appears in the Teen Titans Go! episode "Little Elvis", voiced by John DiMaggio.

=== Film ===
==== Animated ====
- Shazam appears in Superman/Shazam!: The Return of Black Adam, voiced by James Garner. This version is based on the original Fawcett Comics incarnation, and chose to isolate himself within a remote cave as penance for empowering Black Adam after banishing the fallen champion to the farthest star in the universe. Upon summoning Billy Batson and anointing him with his magical abilities, Shazam removes himself to an alternate dimension and destroys his cave sanctuary.
- Shazam appears in Lego DC Super Hero Girls: Super-Villain High, voiced by Khary Payton.
- Shazam appears in the LEGO films Lego DC Batman: Family Matters and Lego DC Shazam! Magic and Monsters, voiced by Ralph Garman.

==== Live-action ====
- Shazam appears in Adventures of Captain Marvel, portrayed by Nigel De Brulier.
- Shazam appears in media set in the DC Extended Universe (DCEU), portrayed by Djimon Hounsou. Originally, Ron Cephas Jones was intended to play the character, but had to step down due to scheduling conflicts. This version of the character is inspired based upon the earlier New 52 version.
  - The character is introduced in the 2019 film Shazam!. This version considered Doctor Sivana to be his successor, but rejected him after he was corrupted by the Seven Deadly Enemies of Man. Years later, Sivana returns to the Rock of Eternity, frees the Enemies, and defeats Shazam using their power. Shazam chooses Billy Batson as his successor before seemingly dying as he crumbles to dust.
  - Shazam makes a cameo appearance in Black Adam. He and the Council of Wizards were responsible for empowering Hurut to be Kahndaq's champion until he was killed by King Ak-Ton's assassins while reviving his father Teth-Adam with his power. Shazam was the sole survivor of the Council of Wizards after Teth-Adam attacked them in rage when they deemed him unworthy of his power following his massacre of King Ak-Ton and his followers. He imprisoned Teth-Adam within what would become the tomb for both Adam and the Crown of Sabbac.
  - Shazam returns in Shazam! Fury of the Gods. Here, he is revealed to be alive, but was imprisoned in the God Realm of the Daughters of Atlas, Hespera and Kalypso. They recover his staff in the Acropolis Museum and force him to repair it so they can regain their powers. Shazam then enters Billy's dream to warn him about the Daughters of Atlas, later learning that he broke the staff to separate the God's Realm from Earth. Later, the Wizard meets Freddy Freeman, who is also a prisoner, and the two escape with the help of Atlas's third daughter, Anthea, and reunites with Billy and the Shazam Family. After escaping and Billy's brothers (except him) losing his powers to Kalypso, the Wizard tells him that he chose Billy because of his selflessness and concern for his family and that he must accept himself as a true hero. Later, before a monster attack in the city, the Wizard helps the children to ride unicorns to scare them away. After Kalypso and her monsters were defeated by the Shazam Family and Billy, who also sacrificed his life, he was brought into the God's Realm to attend his funeral with the depowered staff. After Wonder Woman appears and restores the staff's power with her residual power of Zeus, this act revived both Billy and the powers once lost in the God's Realm, including Anthea. The Wizard gives the staff, and Billy uses the staff to restore the powers of his foster siblings. In the aftermath, the Wizard visits Billy's family and Anthea before reclaiming his staff and leaving to travel the world.

=== Video games ===
- Shazam appears in Mortal Kombat vs. DC Universe, voiced by Joe J. Thomas. After Captain Marvel fended off Raiden, the presence of Shazam appears and tells him that Dark Kahn is behind the DC and Mortal Kombat universes merging and that Darkseid's essence has merged with evil magic from the other world. Shazam then tells Captain Marvel to help defeat Dark Kahn by gathering an "army of both dark and light" to fight him before the world merge is complete enough for the Kombat Rage to consume every living being on both worlds. In Superman's ending, Superman seeks the aid of Shazam to help him prepare for any protection against future magical threats, having him create a new costume for him that gives him immunity to magic. In Captain Marvel's ending, Shazam guides him through a focusing ritual to regain control of his powers.
- Shazam appears as a character summon in Scribblenauts Unmasked: A DC Comics Adventure.
- Shazam appears as a support card in the mobile version of Injustice: Gods Among Us.
- Shazam appears as a playable character via DLC in Lego DC Super-Villains.
