= Bill Parker (comics) =

American comic book writer

- Parker from the Princeton University Yearbook "Bric-a-Bric" (1933)
- Born: William Lee Parker; September 11, 1911 East Orange, New Jersey, U.S.
- Died: January 31, 1963 (aged 51) New York City, U.S.
- Areas: Writer, Editor
- Notable works: Captain Marvel; Spy Smasher

William Lee Parker (September 11, 1911 – January 31, 1963) was an American comic book writer and editor. He is best known for creating the Fawcett Comics character, Captain Marvel, in 1939, along with artist C. C. Beck.

== Early life ==
Parker was born in East Orange, New Jersey. He graduated in 1929 from The Lawrenceville School in New Jersey, and then attended Princeton University, where he was a member of the Cannon Club, Press Club and ROTC. After graduating from Princeton in 1933 with a degree in English Literature, Parker worked for three years for the New York Herald Tribune as a sports editor and in the education department, followed by a year as sports editor of the Literary Digest.

== Career ==
In September 1937, Parker joined Fawcett Publications, initially as an editor on its crime and detective magazines and then as an editor on its movie magazine line. He stayed in this role until August 1939, when he was asked to become the senior editor of a new comic book line that Fawcett intended to bring to market.

After agreeing to take on the comic book project, Parker was assigned the task of creating the characters and stories for Fawcett's first comic magazine, Whiz Comics. For the lead character, Parker developed a superhero that he initially named "Captain Thunder," later changed to "Captain Marvelous" at the suggestion of Fawcett General Manager Ralph Daigh and then to "Captain Marvel" at the suggestion of Fawcett artist Pete Costanza. Parker originally conceived Captain Marvel as a leader of a group of men, each of whom possessed one outstanding characteristic, and who would be called upon by the leader as the needs of each mission demanded. This concept was inspired by stories of the Knights of the Round Table that Parker had read as a boy in James Baldwin's 1910 book "Stories of the King." Fawcett's Daigh, however, was against the idea of a group, so Parker decided to combine all of the outstanding characteristics of the group into a single character. He drew these characteristics from six mythological heroes – Solomon, Hercules, Achilles, Zeus, Atlas and Mercury – and used the first letter of each as an acrostic for the word "Shazam."

After Parker had fully developed Captain Marvel's character and backstory, artist Clarence "C.C." Beck was brought in to flesh out the character's look, to which Parker contributed the ideas for the Hessian cape and the lightning bolt logo. Captain Marvel's first appearance was in Whiz Comics #2, which went on sale in December 1939.

In addition to co-creating Captain Marvel, Parker also co-created the other Fawcett characters that debuted in Whiz Comics #2, including Ibis the Invincible (with C.C. Beck), Golden Arrow (with Pete Costanza), Spy Smasher (with C.C. Beck), Scoop Smith (with Greg Duncan), Lance O'Casey (with Bob Kingett) and Dan Dare (with Greg Duncan).

At the time he created Captain Marvel, Parker was a member of the cavalry in the New York National Guard, and in October 1940 left Fawcett to join the U.S. Army in active service. He served in the Pacific Theater during World War II, rising to the rank of Major.

Following World War II, he rejoined Fawcett Publications in December 1945, but had no further involvement in comics. From 1945 to 1948 he was the feature editor of Today's Woman, before becoming the senior editor of Mechanix Illustrated, a position he held until his death in 1963.

Parker died of an illness on January 31, 1963, in Roosevelt Hospital, New York. He was buried with military honors in the Arlington National Cemetery in Virginia. Parker was survived by his wife, the former Elizabeth Hennig, and two step-daughters. Parker's only child, William Lee Parker Jr., died in infancy in 1949.

== Bibliography ==
- Deposition of Captain William Lee Parker in Detective Comics, Inc. v. Fawcett Publications, Inc., September 11, 1944.
- Trial testimony of William Lee Parker in Detective Comics, Inc. v. Fawcett Publications, Inc., March 9, 1948.
