= C. C. Beck =

American comic book artist (1910–1989)

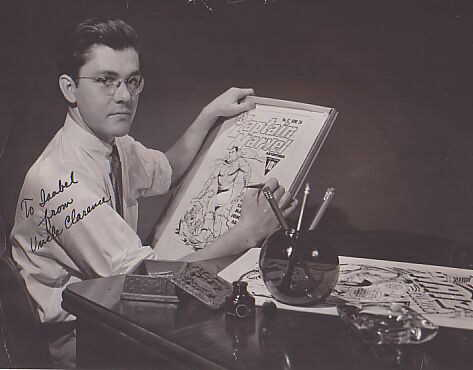
- Early 1940s publicity photo of C.C. Beck, signed to his niece
- Born: Charles Clarence Beck; June 8, 1910 Zumbrota, Minnesota, U.S.
- Died: November 22, 1989 (aged 79) Gainesville, Florida, U.S.
- Area: Penciller
- Notable works: Captain Marvel; Spy Smasher

Charles Clarence Beck (June 8, 1910 – November 22, 1989) was an American cartoonist and comic book artist, best known for his work on Captain Marvel (today known as Shazam!) at Fawcett Comics and DC Comics.

== Early life ==
C. C. Beck was born on June 8, 1910, in Zumbrota, Minnesota. Beck's father was a Lutheran minister and his mother was a schoolteacher. He had two older sisters. When he was 15, his family moved to West Bend, Wisconsin. He studied at the Chicago Academy of Fine Arts and the University of Minnesota, and also took an art correspondence course.

== Career ==
=== Fawcett Comics ===
In 1933, Beck joined Fawcett Publications as a staff artist, where he created pulp magazines. When the company began producing comic books in autumn 1939, Beck was assigned to draw a character created by writer Bill Parker called "Captain Thunder". Before the first issue of Whiz Comics came out, the character's name was changed to Captain Marvel. Besides Captain Marvel, Beck also drew other Fawcett series, including the adventures of Spy Smasher and Ibis the Invincible.

His early Captain Marvel stories set the style for the series. Beck favored a cartoony versus realistic rendering of character and setting, which also came to be reflected in the whimsical scripting (by Otto Binder and others). The Captain Marvel stories boasted a clean style which facilitated Beck's assistants and other Fawcett artists emulating Beck's style (one exception was Mac Raboy whose work on Captain Marvel, Jr. was more in the style of Alex Raymond). While Beck oversaw the visual aspects of the various comics featuring Captain Marvel, he emphatically stated in an interview with Tom Heintjes published in Hogan's Alley #3 that he and his fellow artists had no input or influence on the scripts they illustrated, noting "In the 13 years I spent drawing Captain Marvel, I wrote only one story, about Billy's trip to a Mayan temple [Whiz Comics 22, "Capt. Marvel and the Temple of Itzalotahui"], which had to be submitted in typed form and edited and approved before I was allowed to illustrate it." At most he allowed the art and editorial departments "did develop an interplay of ideas ... that kept Captain Marvel changing and developing."

The popularity of Captain Marvel allowed Fawcett to produce a number of spin-off comic books and Beck to open his own New York City comics studio in 1941. He later expanded his studio, adding one in Englewood, New Jersey. Beck's studio supplied most of the artwork in the Marvel Family line of books. In this he acted as Chief Artist (akin to an art director), a role Fawcett formally recognized on the contents page of Captain Marvel Adventures. This facilitated Beck's efforts to bring a coherent look to the stories with Captain Marvel and related characters, ensuring they adhered to the style he originated. The studio also did commercial art, most prominently a series of advertisements in comic strip form starring Captain Tootsie promoting Tootsie Roll. Done in the style of the Marvel Family books and similarly whimsical (this Captain had a large T on his shirt instead of a lightning bolt), the ads appeared in comic books published by both Fawcett and its rivals, and in Sunday comic strip sections of newspapers.

After years of litigation due to a suit lodged by National Comics Publications (one of the companies that would later become DC Comics) against Fawcett for copyright infringement claiming that Captain Marvel was a copy of Superman (see National Comics Publications, Inc. v. Fawcett Publications, Inc.), Fawcett in the early 1950s (partly in response to flagging sales) reached a settlement with DC in which it agreed to discontinue its comic line.

=== Later work ===
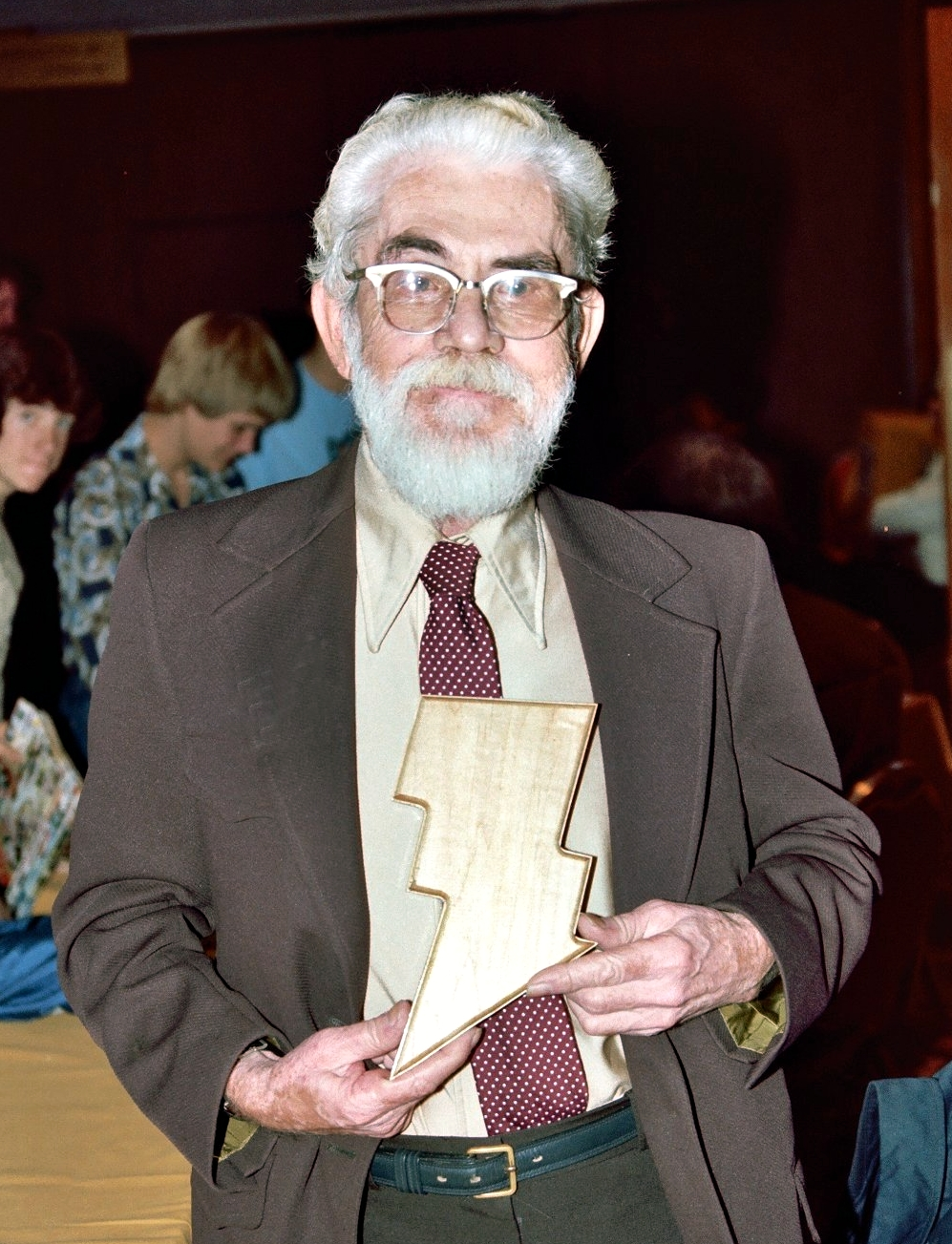
C. C. Beck in 1982

After Fawcett Comics folded, Beck left the comic book industry but continued doing commercial illustrations. With Otto Binder, Beck prepared six sample strips for a proposed newspaper comic strip starring the character Tawky Tawny but it was rejected by the syndicates that saw it. By 1953, Beck had relocated to Florida and owned the Ukulele Bar & Grill in Miami, Florida, where he tended bar. That year he contacted Joe Simon and expressed a desire to re-enter the comic book industry and sought Simon's aid in creating a suitable character. The result was The Silver Spider, with Beck doing rough art from a script by Jack Oleck; Simon used his connections to pitch the property to Harvey Comics but they rejected it. Several years later, in 1959, Simon and Jack Kirby re-worked the Silver Spider concept for publication by Archie Comics as The Fly.

Beck had a short story titled "Vanishing Point" published in the July 1959 issue of Astounding Science Fiction.

His first return to comics was in the mid-1960s for the short-lived Milson Publications who published three issues of his creation Fatman the Human Flying Saucer. This character was almost the inverse of Captain Marvel in appearance and coloration, but with very different powers. Then in 1973 he was the initial artist for DC Comics' revival of Captain Marvel, titled Shazam! due to trademark issues. Beck left after the tenth issue due to "creative differences" regarding plotlines. Subsequently, at the invitation of E. Nelson Bridwell, Beck submitted a script for a new story "Captain Marvel Battles Evil Incarnate." After Bridwell returned it with extensive editorial changes Beck attempted to draw the rewritten version but became so dissatisfied with it that he tore up the artwork he had drawn thus far and returned the Bridwell draft to DC.

In his retirement, Beck produced a regular opinion column for The Comics Journal entitled "The Crusty Curmudgeon". One of his chief topics was his objections to what he saw as the growing realism in comics art (versus the simpler style he had employed). In the early 1970s, he tutored the filmmaker and special effects artist John R. Ellis.

Beck was guest of honor at the 1973 Comic Art Convention and the 1977 San Diego Comic Book Convention, memorably at the latter he in the evening played guitar serenading fans and guests poolside at the El Cortez Hotel. Beck attended the initial OrlandoCon in 1974 and was a regular attendee into the early 1980s. He was also a guest at the 1982 Minneapolis Comic-Con.

Beck in his later years began doing paintings recreating the covers of Golden Age comic books, both those featuring Captain Marvel and other superheroes and even some of funny animals (Donald Duck, Bugs Bunny). Beck's painting inspired by Carl Barks's unused cover sketch for the story "The Mines of King Solomon" (Uncle Scrooge #19, Sept.–Nov. 1957) was used as the cover when the story was reprinted in Gladstone Comic Album #1 (1987).

In April 1980 Beck became the editor of the newsletter of the Fawcett Collectors of America, which he renamed FCA/SOB for Fawcett Collectors of America/Some Opinionated Bastards (the latter phrase humorously referring to himself). Failing health forced Beck to resign the editorship after nineteen issues (Newsletter #30, dated May/June 1983).

Beck died in Gainesville, Florida, of a renal ailment.

== Awards ==
Beck was recognized for his work with a formal nomination as a finalist for the Jack Kirby Hall of Fame in 1990, and induction in 1997. He was also inducted into the Will Eisner Award Hall of Fame in 1993. In 1977 he was awarded an Inkpot by San Diego Comic-Con.
