= Hoppy the Marvel Bunny =

Comic book superhero

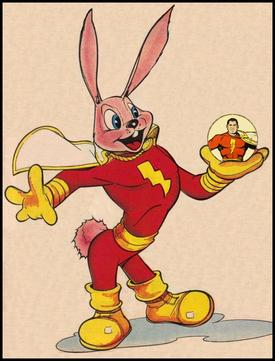
- Excerpt from the cover of Fawcett's Funny Animals #23 (October 1944); cover artist unconfirmed.

Publication information
- Publisher: Fawcett Comics / Charlton Comics / DC Comics
- First appearance: Fawcett's Funny Animals #1 (December 1942)
- Created by: Chad Grothkopf

In-story information
- Alter ego: Hoppy
- Species: Rabbit
- Team affiliations: Marvel Family
- Notable aliases: Captain Marvel Bunny
- Abilities: Super-strength, speed and stamina Physical and magical invulnerability Flight
Hoppy the Marvel Bunny
Publication information
- Publisher: Fawcett Comics
- Schedule: Monthly
- Format: Ongoing series
- Genre: Humor, Superhero, Talking animal
- Publication date: Dec. 1945 – Sept. 1947
- No. of issues: 15
- Main character: Hoppy the Marvel Bunny

Hoppy the Marvel Bunny is a fictional character appearing in American comic books originally published by Fawcett Comics and later DC Comics as a spin-off of Captain Marvel. He was created by Chad Grothkopf and debuted in Fawcett's Funny Animals #1 (December 1942). A comic book superhero and an anthropomorphic animal, Hoppy has made periodic appearances in stories related to Captain Marvel.

== Publication history ==
In 1942, Fawcett Comics decided to add a cartoon animal comic book to accompany its line of superhero, action, and adventure comics. Chad Grothkopf, an artist with experience at DC Comics and Timely Comics, was tapped to come up with concepts for Fawcett's Funny Animals comic; his creations included Willie the Worm, Shelock Monk and Chuck, and Hoppy, a rabbit who dreamed of being strong. For the latter character, Grothkopf added elements from Fawcett's popular Captain Marvel strips, and the lead strip for Funny Animals was set as Hoppy the Marvel Bunny.

Hoppy debuted in Fawcett's Funny Animals #1, and appears in nearly every issue of that comic's run. He also starred in his own 15-issue series, Hoppy the Marvel Bunny (December 1945 – September 1947), which featured several Hoppy stories per issue, along with stories featuring his old co-stars from Fawcett's Funny Animals. One of his foes is Captain Black Bunny, a version of Black Adam.

Hoppy's stories include "Hoppy the Marvel Bunny and the Paper Dolls of Victory!", "The Keepers of the Winds" and "Hoppy Duels with Stinger Bee".

For a span of five issues (#49–54, May–October 1947), Hoppy made no appearances in Fawcett's Funny Animals; these issues featured Billy the Kid and Oscar as the lead feature. Beginning with #55, Hoppy returned as the main feature.

In Fawcett's Funny Animals #69 (February 1951), the Captain Marvel Bunny stories were dropped, replaced by more standard talking-animal stories with just Hoppy. There was no further mention of his career as Captain Marvel Bunny. In issue #80 the word "Fawcett's" was dropped from the title, making the remaining issues simply Funny Animals. The final issue of Funny Animals was #83 (1953).

After Fawcett cancelled Funny Animals, the rights to many of its characters were purchased by Charlton Comics. Charlton resumed publication of Funny Animals with #84 and continued the series to #91 (February 1956). Hoppy also appeared in Charlton's Atomic Mouse, though these stories appear to be edited reprints from Fawcett's Funny Animals. For these reprints, Charlton removed the lightning bolt from Marvel Bunny's suit and recolored the costume, changing his name to Magic Bunny and his magic word to "Alizam!". He is alternately referred to in various Charlton books as "Hoppy", "Happy", "Happy the Magic Bunny" and, according to one source, "Speedy".

DC Comics bought Hoppy, among other characters, when Fawcett went bankrupt in 1953. He has made limited appearances since. A modernized version of Hoppy appears in the revamped New 52/DC Rebirth interpretation of Shazam!, beginning in 2012.

== Fictional character biography ==
Hoppy is a pink rabbit who lives in the town of Funny Animalville, along with an assortment of other funny animal characters. As revealed in the origin story from Fawcett's Funny Animals #1, Hoppy is a fan of Captain Marvel. One day, he decides to emulate his hero and speaks the magic word "Shazam!" Surprisingly, the magic word transforms Hoppy into Captain Marvel Bunny.

Captain Marvel Bunny's enemy, Captain Black Bunny, art by Chad Grothkopf.

In Fawcett's Funny Animals #30 (July 1945), an explanation for Hoppy's powers is revealed. In the story "Hoppy Meets the Wizard Bunny", Hoppy is hit on the head and develops amnesia. The mysterious Wizard Bunny (or Bunny Wizard, both versions are used) is watching, and he flies down to help Hoppy regain his memory. A panel in this story states: "Because it was he who bestowed the magic word and power upon Hoppy, the Bunny Wizard flies down to Earth to help Hoppy". Eventually, the Wizard gets Hoppy to say "Shazam!" and his memory is restored, along with his abilities. This is the Bunny Wizard's only known appearance.

The word "Shazam!" has a slightly different meaning for Hoppy. According to the E. Nelson Bridwell-scripted story, Captain Carrot and His Amazing Zoo Crew! in The Oz-Wonderland War #2, Captain Marvel Bunny has the wisdom of Salamander, the strength of Hogules, the stamina of Antlers, the power of Zebreus, the courage of Abalone, and the speed of Monkury.

Hoppy's stories occasionally feature his girlfriend Millie, who (like Lois Lane) despises the meek Hoppy, but adores the heroic Captain Marvel Bunny. Millie has no idea that Hoppy can become Captain Marvel Bunny.

A noteworthy foe appeared in Fawcett's Funny Animals #32 (Oct–Nov 1945). In the lead story of that issue, Hoppy faces Captain Black Bunny, who is based on Captain Marvel's foe Black Adam. He originates from the Earth's core and is aided by a gang of imps.

In Hoppy's first appearance in DC Comics (in DC Comics Presents #34), he and Millie are magically transported to Earth-S, the home of the Marvel Family in the pre-Crisis DC universe. He aids the Marvel Family and Superman against Mr. Mind, Mr. Mxyzptlk, and King Kull. In this story, both Hoppy and Millie were depicted as white bunnies, instead of their usual pink.

Hoppy next appears in Captain Carrot and His Amazing Zoo Crew! in The Oz-Wonderland War #2 (1986), where he fights alongside the Zoo Crew. In Final Crisis, Hoppy makes a minor appearance as a resident of Limbo.

Following DC's 2011 New 52 reboot, Hoppy was reimagined as a normal rabbit and the pet of Mary Bromfield. In Shazam! #1 (February 2019), Hoppy is accidentally struck by magic lightning when Mary and her foster sister Darla Dudley say "Shazam!" and assume their superhero forms. As a result, Hoppy acquires superpowers (flight and lightning-emitting eyes, among others) and his fur pattern reflects the lightning-bolt emblem of the Shazam Family.

== Powers and abilities ==
Hoppy has powers roughly similar to those of Captain Marvel/Shazam. He is empowered by a different group of deities, consisting of Salamander, Hogules, Antlers, Zebreus, Abalone, and Monkury.

== Reception ==
In American Comic Book Chronicles: 1940-1944, Kurt Mitchell and Roy Thomas wrote: "It was cover star Hoppy the Marvel Bunny who made FFA special. Creator Chad Grothkopf struck a balance in his stories between the usual cartoon animal tropes, fairy tale-style fantasy, and full-tilt super-heroics, the strip's only sticking point the tiresome gimmick of Hoppy never being able to remember his magic word. Whether battling piscine pirate Captain Kid Perch, the Witch, King Artist of Picture Land, or Simon Spider and his living dolls, Marvel Bunny always delivered big laughs and plenty of action".

== See also ==
- Captain Carrot
- Thunderbunny
