= Uncle Marvel =

- Uncle Marvel (fourth from left) standing with the Marvel Family before the Wizard Shazam (right) on the cover of The Marvel Family #1. Art by C. C. Beck.

Publication information
- Publisher: Fawcett Comics (1943–1948); DC Comics (1972–present)
- First appearance: Wow Comics #18 (October 1943)
- Created by: Otto Binder; Marc Swayze

In-story information
- Full name: Dudley H. Dudley
- Team affiliations: Marvel Family
- Supporting character of: Captain Marvel; Mary Marvel
- Notable aliases: Uncle Dudley
- Abilities: Acting; Deception

Uncle Marvel (Dudley H. Dudley) is a fictional character appearing in American comic books formerly published by Fawcett Comics and today by DC Comics, who appears in stories about the Marvel Family team of superheroes.

Uncle Marvel has appeared in various media outside comics, primarily in association with Captain Marvel. Alan Oppenheimer, Corey Burton, and John Astin have voiced the character in animation.

== Publication history ==
Created by Otto Binder and Marc Swayze, Uncle Marvel was created primarily as a supporting character of Mary Marvel and first appeared in Wow Comics #18 in October 1943.

== Fictional character biography ==
An old, rotund man named Dudley, Uncle Marvel did not have any real superpowers and claimed to be Mary Marvel's uncle from California. The Marvels, possessing the wisdom of Solomon, saw through Dudley's machinations, but allowed him to become their manager and supported his delusions. When asked to make use of his supposed superpowers, Dudley would always complain that his "shazambago" was acting up and was interfering with his powers, though the Marvels always knew better.

Though mostly played as comic relief, Dudley plays a key role in Marvel Family #1 as he tricks the rogue Marvel Black Adam (debuting in that story) into saying the magic word "Shazam" and reverting to his mortal self. In Mary Marvel #7, after Mary stops some thugs, Dudley makes Mary promise not to turn into Mary Marvel until midnight, to show that she is helpless without Mary Marvel. He then sends two men to rob the office, not knowing they are actual criminals who kidnap Mary and try to hold her for ransom. The criminals attempt to force Dudley to write a ransom note, but midnight arrives and Mary transforms into Mary Marvel to stop them.

Uncle Marvel continued to appear in the Marvel Family stories through 1948, at which time the character was quietly dropped. He returned to the Marvel Family comics when DC Comics began publishing new stories and reprints under the title Shazam! in 1973, he was put into suspended animation, along with many other Fawcett characters, explained as an attack gone wrong by the Sivana family. He again takes over Shazam Incorporated. After forty years of appearing in the Marvel Family comics, Uncle Dudley was revamped in 1987 along with the rest of the Shazam! franchise. In Roy Thomas and Tom Mandrake's four-issue 1987 miniseries Shazam!: The New Beginning, the character is reimagined as Billy Batson's biological uncle.

A second revamped version of Uncle Marvel was introduced in Jerry Ordway's Power of Shazam! graphic novel in 1994 and a resulting ongoing comic book series of the same name, rendering Thomas and Mandrake's version non-canon. In Ordway's stories, Dudley is the janitor at Billy Batson's school, who looks out for him and inadvertently learns his secret identity. This revelation leads Dudley to be involved in a number of Marvel Family adventures, including one story (The Power of Shazam! #11 and #12) in which Ibis the Invincible gives him superpowers. Dudley continued to appear in The Power of Shazam! for the duration of the series as a recurring supporting character, often paired with Tawky Tawny, an anthropomorphic tiger and friend of Captain Marvel.

Following the cancellation of The Power of Shazam! in 1999, Dudley virtually disappeared from DC Comics publications, save for cameos in 52 and Justice Society of America. He appears more prominently in Convergence and The Multiversity.

In the DC Rebirth relaunch, Dudley H. Dudley is a homeless man in Camp Pacto who befriends Mary Bromfield after she saves him from Babel. Dudley is later kidnapped and held in the basement of Fawcett Community College by Babel's employers before he is rescued by Mary and Darla Dudley.

== Powers and abilities ==
Uncle Marvel was an expert actor and was also good at the act of deception.

The Prime-Earth depiction of Uncle Marvel had him sporting charisma where he claims to have enough of it to make a lot of friends.

=== Equipment ===
The Prime-Earth version of Uncle Marvel carries around a crowbar.

== In other media ==
=== Television ===
- Mentor, a character based on Uncle Marvel, appears in Shazam!, portrayed by Les Tremayne. In concurrent comics, Dudley was given a mustache for some time to better resemble the character.
- Uncle Marvel appears in The Kid Super Power Hour with Shazam!, voiced by Alan Oppenheimer.
- Uncle Dudley appears in Young Justice, voiced by Corey Burton. This version is Billy Batson's legal guardian.
- Uncle Dudley appears in the Justice League Action episode "Captain Bamboozle", voiced by John Astin. This version was given powers by Mister Mxyzptlk.

=== Film ===
- Uncle Super, an alternate version of Uncle Marvel who is a member of the Crime Syndicate, appears in Justice League: Crisis on Two Earths, voiced by Bruce Timm.
- Uncle Dudley makes a non-speaking cameo appearance in Lego DC Shazam! Magic and Monsters.
- An alternate universe variant of Uncle Marvel makes a non-speaking appearance in Justice League: Crisis on Infinite Earths.

=== Video games ===
Uncle Marvel appears as a character summon in Scribblenauts Unmasked: A DC Comics Adventure.
