= Tawky Tawny =

- Captain Marvel and Tawky Tawny as depicted in Captain Marvel Adventures #82 (March 1948). Art by C.C. Beck.

Publication information
- Publisher: Fawcett Comics (1948–1953); DC Comics (1972–present)
- First appearance: Captain Marvel Adventures #79 (December 1947)
- Created by: Otto Binder; C.C. Beck

In-story information
- Species: Bengal tiger
- Team affiliations: Marvel Family; Justice League
- Supporting character of: Captain Marvel
- Abilities: Traditionally none beyond the physical qualities of a tiger; some versions of the character give him shapeshifting abilities from man to tiger, or the ability to transform into a giant Smilodon.

Tawky Tawny is a fictional character, an anthropomorphic tiger who appears as a supporting character of Captain Marvel and the Marvel Family in superhero/talking animal American comic books published by Fawcett Comics and later DC Comics.

The character's debut story introduced him as an anthropomorphic Bengal tiger who traveled from India to the United States in order to integrate into American society. Although he makes efforts to be sociable, his presence terrorizes the public, leading to Captain Marvel intervening.

== Publication history ==
Created by Otto Binder and C.C. Beck in Captain Marvel Adventures #79, the traditional version of Tawky Tawny is a humanoid and well mannered tiger who wishes to be a part of human society. A friend of the Marvel Family, Tawny often participates in their adventures. Later versions introduced in the 2000s and beyond often feature Tawny as more tiger-like, though typically retaining his ability to talk.

== Fictional character biography ==
=== Fawcett Comics and pre-Crisis DC Comics ===
Mr. Tawny made his first appearance in Captain Marvel Adventures #79 (1947), published by Fawcett Comics. The story "The Talking Tiger" introduced him as an anthropomorphic Bengal tiger who traveled from India to the United States to integrate into American society. Although he makes efforts to be sociable, his presence terrorizes the public, leading to Captain Marvel intervening. After learning of his motives, Marvel helps him get a job as a tour guide at the local museum. Tawny's second appearance, Captain Marvel Adventures #82 (1948), reveals that he gained his anthropomorphic form from a serum created by a hermit.

Tawny became a regular recurring character in Captain Marvel Adventures, appearing as the best friend of Captain Marvel, until it ceased publication in 1953. As a respectable gentleman, Tawny typically dressed in a tweed suit, and spoke and acted in a dignified manner. Tawny was only referred to by his last name before Fawcett let the fans decide his first name, with Mary Garrisi and Pat Laughlin deciding on Tawky (a deliberate misspelling of "talky"). Tawny's creators, Otto Binder and C. C. Beck, unsuccessfully attempted to launch a newspaper strip featuring him in 1953.

Following the end of the publication of Captain Marvel Adventures when Fawcett Comics discontinued all of their superhero comics (see National Comics Publications v. Fawcett Publications), Tawny later resurfaced when DC Comics bought the rights to the Fawcett characters and began publishing new Captain Marvel stories, along with Fawcett reprints, under the comic book title Shazam! beginning in 1973.

=== Post-Crisis DC Comics ===
Tawky Tawny was written out of continuity following DC's Crisis on Infinite Earths maxiseries in 1985–86. A new version of the character was introduced by Jerry Ordway and Peter Krause in DC's The Power of Shazam! graphic novel in 1994 and its subsequent comic book series spinoff in 1995. In the graphic novel, "Tawky Tawny" was a popular children's toy doll owned by Billy Batson's sister Mary Batson; the doll plays a key part in the origin story of Black Adam by being used to hide part of the scarab necklace which allowed him to first access his powers.

The subsequent comic series features the stuffed doll gaining the power from the demon Lord Satanus to transform into a six-foot anthropomorphic tiger who describes himself as a pooka, with The Power of Shazam! #4 being his first appearance in the series. Tawny is given life by Satanus to help Billy Batson and the Marvel Family in their fight against his sister, the demon Blaze. Under Satanus' spell, Tawny only appeared sentient to Billy, Mary, and Uncle Dudley; everyone else only sees a doll. Towards the conclusion of this story arc in The Power of Shazam! #11, Tawny is given permanent anthropomorphic form by the magical superhero Ibis the Invincible, after he proves to be more of an aid to the Marvels than Satanus intended.

Following the cancellation of The Power of Shazam! in 1999, Tawny only appeared sporadically in DC Comics stories. In 52 #16 (2006), he appears as a guest of the wedding of reformed Marvel Family villain Black Adam and his bride Isis. In The Trials of Shazam! #10 (2007), Tawny helps Freddy Freeman (formerly Captain Marvel's sidekick Captain Marvel Jr.) fight the evil Sabina, revealing a new ability to transform into a Smilodon. In Final Crisis, Tawky Tawny allies with the All-Star Squadron and battles Kalibak and his Tigermen. Tawky kills Kalibak and gain leadership of the Tigermen.

=== The New 52 ===
In September 2011, The New 52 rebooted DC's continuity. In this new timeline, Tawny appears as a recurring character in the Shazam! backup stories published in Justice League (vol. 2) from issue #7 through #21. In these stories, Tawny is a normal tiger residing at the Philadelphia city zoo who is a friend of young Billy Batson. When Billy gains the power to transform into Shazam, he attempts to give Tawny the power to turn into a giant Smilodon, but casts the spell incorrectly. Tawny is imbued with Billy's magic, but soon reverts to his original form.

=== DC Rebirth ===
The anthropomorphic version of Tawky Tawny returns in Geoff Johns' Shazam! series, making his first appearance in Shazam! #4 (2019).

This version of Tawny is a citizen of the Wildlands, one of the Seven Magiclands that are connected by the Rock of Eternity. Despite being a realm exclusively populated by anthropomorphic animals, the Wildlands segregates tigers from regular society and still regards them as wild animals kept in zoos. Tawny is arrested for breaking "the Laws of Nature" by wearing clothes and reading a self-help book called How to Stop Eating Your Friends, which is viewed as 'forbidden literature'.

Tawny is stripped naked and thrown into an enclosure where he tries to appeal to the other tigers, declaring they can rise up against prejudice and should not be judged for what their predecessors have done. The tigers refuse to cooperate out of fear of the mayor executing them, ignoring Tawny's protests. Tawny befriends the Shazam Family after Freddy Freeman and Darla Dudley are trapped in the Wildlands and sentenced to be fed to tigers.

== Other versions ==
- An alternate universe version of Tawky Tawny makes a cameo appearance in Kingdom Come.
- An alternate universe version of Tawky Tawny appears in Shazam! The Monster Society of Evil and its spinoff Billy Batson and the Magic of Shazam!. This version is a tiger-like ifrit who can disguise himself as a human or regular cat.
- An alternate universe version of Tawky Tawny appears in Flashpoint. This version is an ordinary tiger owned by the Shazam Family who can transform into a Smilodon and has a passive cloaking effect that disguises him as a regular cat.

== In other media ==
=== Television ===
- Tawky Tawny appears in The Kid Super Power Hour with Shazam!, voiced by Alan Oppenheimer.
- Tawky Tawny appears in the Young Justice episode "Alpha Male", with vocal effects provided by Dee Bradley Baker. This version is a normal tiger who the Brain augmented with Kobra-Venom injections and intelligence-enhancing treatments.
- Tawky Tawny appears in the "Shazam" segment of DC Nation Shorts, voiced by Brian George.

=== Film ===
Tawky Tawny appears in Superman/Shazam!: The Return of Black Adam, voiced by Kevin Michael Richardson. This version is a mystical, non-anthropomorphic tiger and servant of Shazam who can assume a human form.

=== Miscellaneous ===
Tawny Tawny appears in All-New Batman: The Brave and the Bold #2.
