= The Kid Super Power Hour with Shazam! =

- Genre: Animation; Fantasy
- Based on: Captain Marvel by: Bill Parker; C. C. Beck
- Country of origin: United States
- No. of episodes: 38

Production
- Executive producers: Norm Prescott; Lou Scheimer
- Producer: Arthur H. Nadel
- Cinematography: R.W. Pope
- Editors: Ron Fedele; Joe Gall; Hector C. Gika
- Running time: 60 minutes
- Production companies: Filmation; DC Comics

Original release
- Network: NBC
- Release: September 12 – November 28, 1981

The Kid Super Power Hour with Shazam! is an NBC Saturday-morning cartoon produced by Filmation Studios in 1981. The hour-long show included two cartoon stories, with a variety of live-action wraparound segments.

Hero High featured a group of students attending a high school for superheroes. This was a comedy originally planned to feature the characters from Archie Comics, but during development, production company Filmation terminated their relationship with the publishers, and the characters were turned into more generic versions of the same roles.

Shazam! was based on the DC Comics series of the same name, the adventures of Captain Marvel and his Marvel Family, including Mary Marvel, Captain Marvel Jr., Uncle Marvel, and their tiger, Tawky Tawny. In the show, the team fights enemies like Doctor Sivana, Mister Mind, Black Adam, Mister Atom, Ibac, and more.

From time to time, the characters of one show would appear in the other. Isis from The Secrets of Isis also made a guest appearance in animated form on Hero High.

== Episodes ==
=== Shazam! ===
No.	Title	Written by	Original release date
1	"Who's Who at the Zoo"	Fred Ladd (story); Dennis O'Flaherty (teleplay)	12 September 1981
When some new animals arrive at the Fawcett City zoo, one of the gorillas soon recognized as Doctor Allirog, a talking super-intelligent animal that recently escaped from a cave, having been placed there by the Marvel Family. Allirog is intent on making sure that animals are the more dominant species. He captures Mary and Freddy, then Uncle Marvel, binding and gagging them all, and uses a device that increases Captain Marvel's powers meaning he cannot control them.
2	"The Incredible Sinking City"	Paul Dini	19 September 1981
Mister Mind assembles an army of worms in a plot to take over Fawcett City.
3	"Best Seller"	Dennis O'Flaherty	26 September 1981
Billy and Mary's cousin Freckles Marvel comes to visit and brings Mary a book. That night, the Hiss-Men emerge from the book, capture Billy, Mary, and Freddy by binding and gagging them, and bring them to Ibac in prehistoric times. The three heroes are turned into Hiss-Men as part of the plot to take over pre-historic humanity.
4	"Flight 601 Has Vanished"	Dennis O'Flaherty	3 October 1981
A tornado ends up sending Mary Batson, Uncle Dudley, and Doctor Sivana into the Fourth Dimension as Billy and Freddy follow as well. Once there, they end up as playthings for a giant girl named Magna alongside any other creatures that ended up caught in the Dimension Transporter.
5	"Black Adam's Return"	Dennis O'Flaherty	10 October 1981
After a 5,000-year absence, Black Adam has returned to Earth with a plot to resurrect Princess Jemia. When the princess is destroyed, Black Adam captures Mary Marvel and flies off into outer space with Captain Marvel & Captain Marvel Jr. in pursuit.
6	"A Menacing Family Affair"	Paul Dini	17 October 1981
Doctor Sivana, Georgia Sivana, and Sivana Jr. end up meeting an alien who gives them an amulet that gives them superpowers equal to those of the Marvel Family. The Sivana Family calls out The Marvels for a battle royal.
7	"Uncle Dudley's Wedding Day"	Dennis O'Flaherty	24 October 1981
Aunt Minerva kidnaps Uncle Dudley who wants him to be her husband. It's up to the Marvel Family to save him. The Marvels are however bound and gagged by Minerva's henchmen after she sees their transformation and placed inside a machine which will make them Minerva's slaves.
8	"A Little Something Extra"	Paul Dini	31 October 1981
A disguised Black Adam tosses Freddy a false news publication with the headlines stating, "Captain Marvel Vanishes!". Freddy, as Captain Marvel Jr., rushes the news to Mary to find Billy who might be in danger, assuming that whoever made the false publication knows their secret identity.
9	"The Airport Caper"	Dennis O'Flaherty	7 November 1981
Night Owl goes to the airport to steal some gold and two tiger cubs. When Mr. Tawny fails to retrieve them and ends up captured, it's up to the Marvel Family to save him and defeat Night Owl.
10	"Mister Atom, the Smasher"	Fred Ladd	14 November 1981
Mr. Atom plans to take over the world using robots he's created, but is stopped by both the Marvels and Uncle Dudley's new invention: a strong remote control door opener that actually can control any mechanical device. Mr. Atom's then captured by the Marvels using a powerful electromagnet located inside his HQ.
11	"The Circus Plot"	Paul Dini	21 November 1981
Doctor Sivana and Mister Mind create a magic grid that harnesses the power of the sun. Meanwhile, Mr. Tawny tries to audition for the opportunity to join Colonel Beauregard Jason's circus where each attempt goes comically awry.
12	"Star Master and the Solar Mirror"	Tom Ruegger	28 November 1981
An evil alien known as the Star Master threatens earth. When the Marvels confront him, he captures Mary and Junior. He then send an ultimatum to the United Nations: surrender Earth, or else he'll destroy it. The U.N. refuses to bow to his demand and plan to launch a rocket that can project a force field, but they need to know where he's planning to strike. Captain Marvel then goes to Hero High to enlist the aid of some of their students. Note: This was the only episode to feature a crossover with the Hero High segment.

== Cast ==
=== Hero High ===
- John Berwick – Rex Ruthless
- Jere Fields – Misty Magic
- Linda Gary – Miss Grimm
- Jim Greenleaf – Weatherman
- Christopher Hensel – Captain California
- Maylo McCaslin – Dirty Trixie
- Alan Oppenheimer – Mr. Sampson
- Rebecca Perle – Glorious Gal
- Erika Scheimer – Brat Man
- Lou Scheimer – A.W.O.L.
- Johnny Venocour – Punk Rock

=== Shazam! ===
- Barry Gordon – Captain Marvel Jr./Freddy Freeman
- Dawn Jeffory – Mary Marvel/Mary Batson, Freckles Marvel, Aunt Minerva
- Burr Middleton – Captain Marvel/Billy Batson
- Alan Oppenheimer – Uncle Marvel/Uncle Dudley, Doctor Sivana, Tawky Tawny, Shazam, Mister Mind, Mister Atom
- Norm Prescott – Narrator (uncredited)
- Lou Scheimer – Sterling Morris, Black Adam, Ibac (uncredited)

== Reception ==
In 1982, The Kid Super Power Hour with Shazam! was nominated for a Young Artist Award for "Best Children's Television Series", while Rebecca Perle won a YAA for "Best Young Actress in a Daytime Series". Two years later, she and Johnny "Punk Rock" Venocour would co-star in Savage Streets.
