= Marvel Family =

Superhero family appearing in DC Comics

Shazam Family Marvel Family
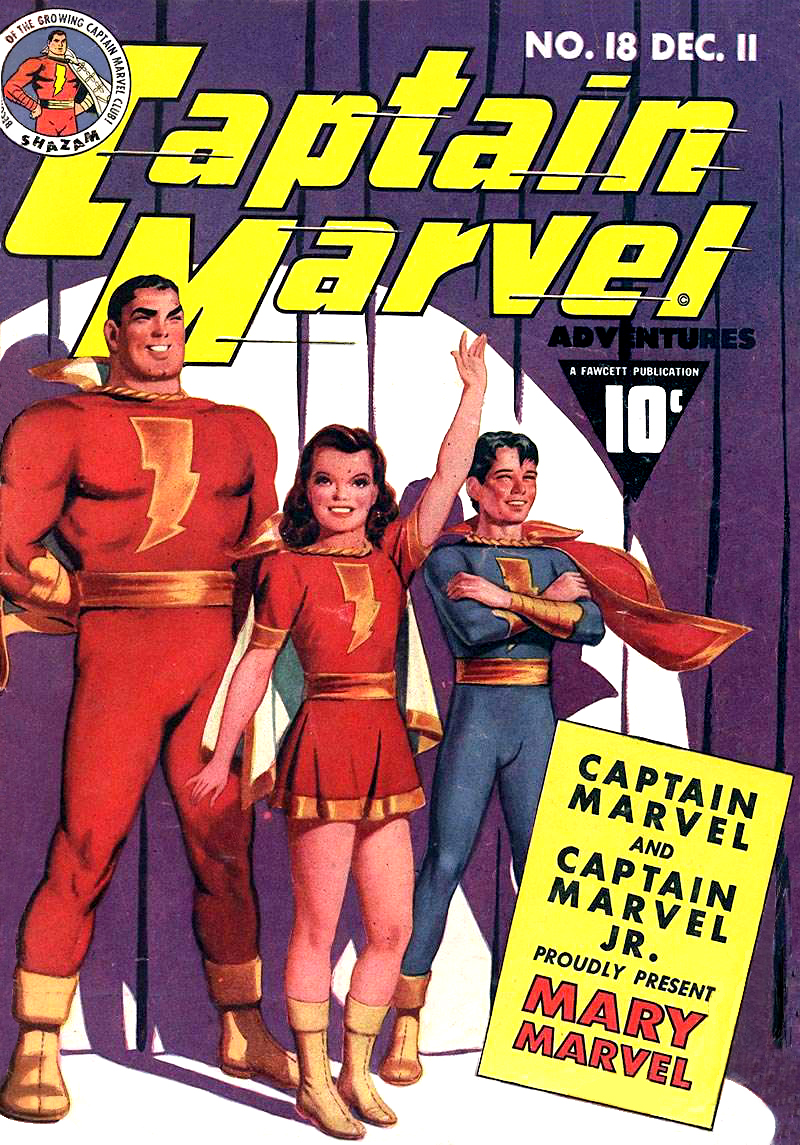
- The cover of Captain Marvel Adventures #18, published in 1942 by Fawcett Comics, featuring (left to right) Captain Marvel, Mary Marvel and Captain Marvel Jr. Art by C. C. Beck.

Publication information
- Publisher: Fawcett Comics (1942–1953); DC Comics (1972–present)
- First appearance: Captain Marvel Adventures #18 (December 1942)
- Created by: Otto Binder; Marc Swayze

In-story information
- Base(s): Fawcett City; Philadelphia; Rock of Eternity

Roster
- See: Billy Batson (Captain Marvel/Shazam); Mary Batson/Bromfield (Mary Marvel); Freddy Freeman (Captain Marvel Jr.); Lieutenant Marvels; Tawky Tawny; The Wizard Shazam; Hoppy the Marvel Bunny; Uncle Marvel (Uncle Dudley); Kid Eternity (Christopher Freeman); Eugene Choi; Pedro Peña; Darla Dudley

Marvel Family
Marvel Family
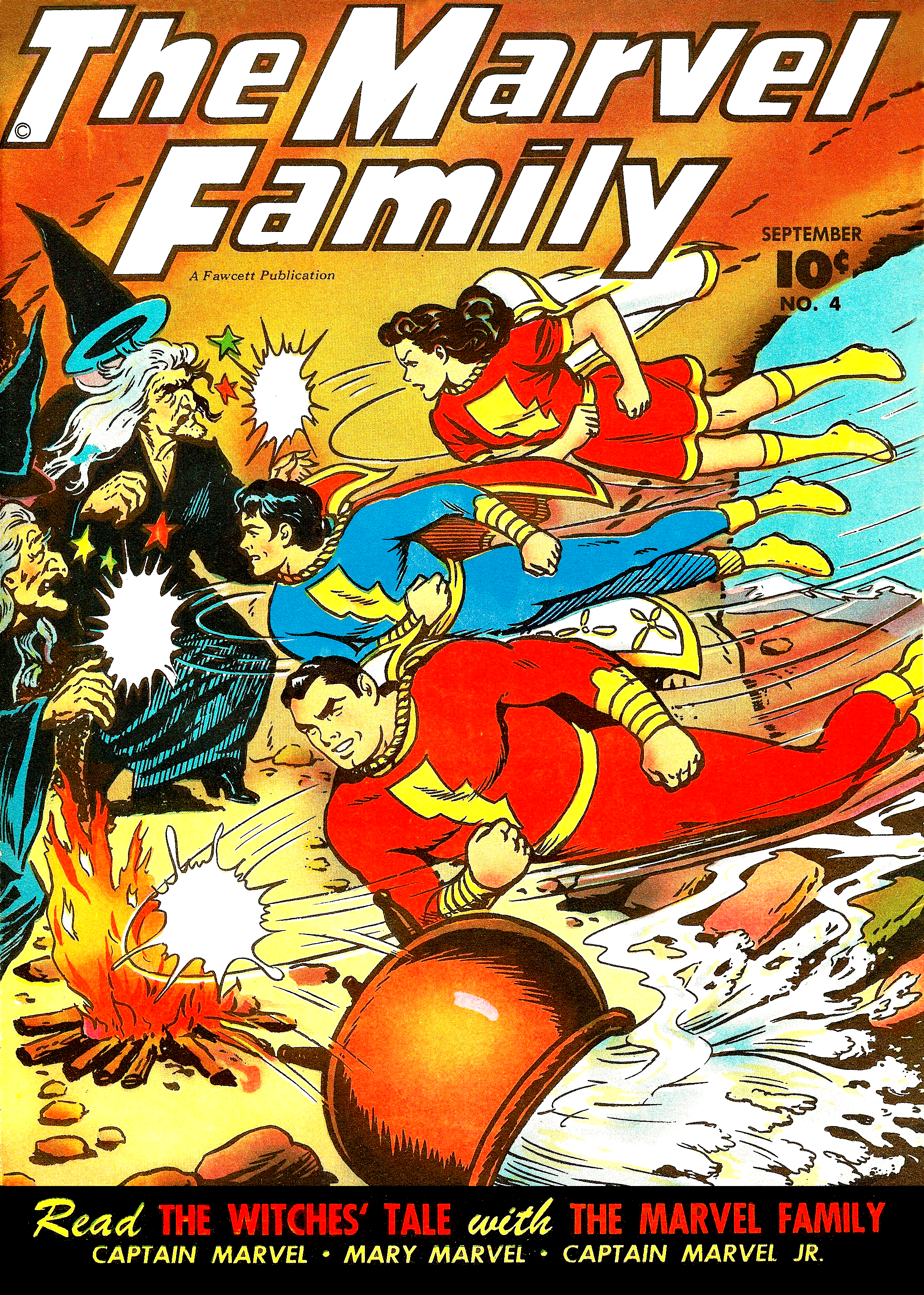
- Captain Marvel, Mary Marvel, and Captain Marvel Jr. on the cover of The Marvel Family #4 (September 1946). Art by C.C. Beck.
Publication information
- Publisher: Fawcett Comics
- Schedule: Monthly
- Format: Ongoing series
- Genre: Superhero/adventure
- Publication date: December 1945 – January 1954
- No. of issues: 89
- Main character: Marvel Family
Creative team
- Written by: Otto Binder
- Artist(s): C. C. Beck, Pete Costanza, Kurt Schaffenberger
- Editor: Wendell Crowley

The Marvel Family, also known as the Shazam Family (also Shazamily), are a group of superheroes who originally appeared in American comic books published by Fawcett Comics and were later acquired by DC Comics. Created in 1942 by writer Otto Binder and artist Marc Swayze, the team was created as an extension of Fawcett's Captain Marvel franchise, and included Marvel's sister Mary Marvel, their friend Captain Marvel Jr., and, at various times, a number of other characters as well.

Because Marvel Comics trademarked their own Captain Marvel comic book during the interim between the demise of the Fawcett Comics' Captain Marvel comics in 1953 and DC's revival in 1972, DC Comics is today unable to promote and market Captain Marvel under that name. Since 1972, DC has instead used the trademark Shazam! for their comic book titles with the Marvel Family characters, and the name under which they market and promote the characters. When referring to the Marvel Family on comic book covers or various merchandise, they are by this legal necessity called the "Shazam Family".

In 2012, DC officially changed Captain Marvel's name to Shazam, making Shazam Family the name of the superhero's associates. In current continuity, the Shazam Family comprises the superpowered alter egos of Billy Batson (teenaged alter-ego of Shazam, formerly Captain Marvel) and his foster siblings: Mary Bromfield (formerly Mary Marvel), Freddy Freeman (formerly Captain Marvel Jr.), Darla Dudley, Pedro Peña, and Eugene Choi.

The Shazam Family made their cinematic debut in the DC Extended Universe film Shazam!, released in 2019 by New Line Cinema and Warner Bros., and returned in the 2023 sequel, Shazam! Fury of the Gods.

== Publication history ==
The Marvel Family was established in 1942 after the introductions of Captain Marvel's partners, the Lieutenant Marvels (Whiz Comics #21, September 1941), Captain Marvel Jr. (Whiz Comics #25, December 1941) and Mary Marvel (Captain Marvel Adventures #18, December 1942). With Junior and Mary's additions to his adventures, Captain Marvel became the first superhero to have a team of sidekicks who share his powers, abilities, and appearance; a concept later adapted for heroes such as Superman, Batman, and Aquaman, among others.

The members of the Marvel Family appeared both separately and together in many of Fawcett's comic book series, including Whiz Comics, Wow Comics, Master Comics, Captain Marvel Adventures, Captain Marvel Jr., Mary Marvel, and The Marvel Family. By the late 1940s, Marvel Family comics were among the most popular in the industry, and the Marvel Family had expanded to include both non-superpowered characters (Uncle Marvel and Freckles Marvel) and even talking animals (Hoppy the Marvel Bunny). By 1953, all of these books had ceased publication, due to Superman publisher DC Comics' lawsuit against Fawcett.

In 1972, DC licensed the rights to the Marvel Family characters, and began publishing them in a comic series titled Shazam!. Fawcett sold DC the rights to the characters in 1980, by which time Shazam! had been cancelled, and the Marvels had been relegated the back-up feature of World's Finest Comics, and, later, Adventure Comics. DC retconned Captain Marvel in 1986 with their Legends miniseries, establishing him as a solo hero without a team. Writer/artist Jerry Ordway resurrected the Marvel Family in 1995 with his Power of Shazam! series, establishing the team as being made up solely of Captain Marvel, Mary Marvel and Captain Marvel Jr. Following several attempts at relaunching the Shazam! franchise during the mid-2000s, the Marvel Family was temporarily dissolved by writers Geoff Johns and Jerry Ordway in Justice Society of America (vol. 3) #25, with only Captain Marvel Jr., now known as Shazam, retaining his powers, but from another source. In the interim, Captain Marvel and Mary Marvel continued to appear in Billy Batson and the Magic of Shazam!, an all-ages comic book series published under DC's youth-oriented Johnny DC line which ran from 2008 to 2010. Captain Marvel Jr. joined the pair towards the end of the run of Magic of Shazam!, following a brief period serving as the sidekick of the Marvels' enemy under the name Black Adam Jr.

The Shazam Family was reintroduced during DC Comics' continuity-altering Flashpoint miniseries in 2011, as six kids who all spoke "Shazam!" in unison to become one superhero, Captain Thunder. In the later company-wide "New 52" reboot that followed Flashpoint, the Captain Marvel character was renamed "Shazam" and starred in a backup segment of the Justice League series (second volume) from 2012 to 2013. These backups, by writer Geoff Johns and artist Gary Frank, introduced Billy Batson/Shazam and his new Shazam Family, consisting of Billy and his five foster siblings, with whom he shares his powers.

In 2022, DC published a facsimile edition of Marvel Family Comics No. 1 as a tie-in with the release of the film Black Adam.

== Marvel/Shazam Family members ==
The modern-day Shazam Family on the variant cover of Shazam! (vol. 3) #13 (September 2020). Clockwise from center: Shazam/Billy Batson, Freddy Freeman, Mary Bromfield, Eugene Choi, Darla Dudley, and Pedro Peña. Art by Julian Totino Tedesco.

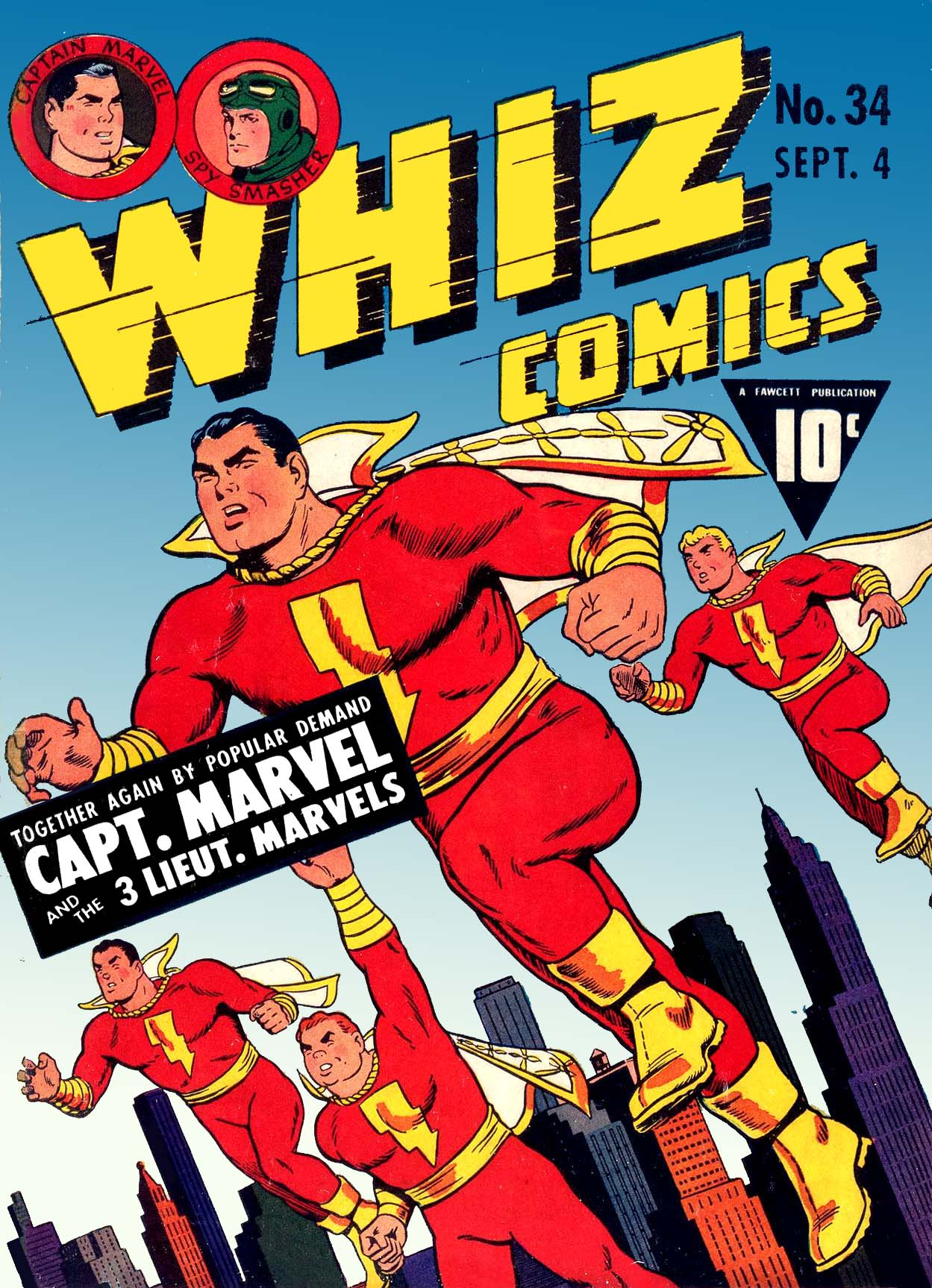
Captain Marvel and the three Lieutenants Marvel as depicted on the cover of Whiz Comics #34 (September 1942). Clockwise from top: Captain Marvel, Lt. Hill Marvel, Lt. Fat Marvel, and Lt. Tall Marvel. Art by C.C. Beck and Pete Costanza.

=== Primary members ===
==== Billy Batson (Captain Marvel / Shazam) ====
The "World's Mightiest Mortal", Captain Marvel is the superpowered alter-ego of Billy Batson, an orphaned boy who speaks the name of the wizard Shazam to become an adult superhero. Billy has the powers of Solomon (wisdom), Hercules (strength), Atlas (stamina), Zeus (power), Achilles (courage), and Mercury (speed). He served as the wizard Shazam's champion and herald.

In the Golden Age and Bronze Age comics, Billy chose to share his powers with his sister Mary and his friend Freddy Freeman, creating the Marvel Family. Outside of the Marvel Family, Captain Marvel served briefly as a member of both the Justice League International and the Justice Society of America.

After the 2011 The New 52 reboot of the Shazam! characters by Geoff Johns and Gary Frank, Billy Batson is a troubled foster child who has inherited the name, powers, and seat on the council of magic of the wizard Shazam. Becoming a hero inspired the initially brash and standoffish Billy to evolve into a noble hero and leader who embraces his new foster family. As Shazam, Billy has powers and a red-uniformed appearance similar to the traditional version of Captain Marvel with the added ability to wield magic via the "living lightning" that powers him. For a time, Shazam was infected by The Batman Who Laughs with Joker Venom and became King Shazam (while Billy became a Robin).

==== Mary Bromfield (Mary Marvel) ====
In traditional Shazam! stories, Mary is Billy's once-lost twin sister Mary Batson. She is technically the oldest twin in the pair (adopted as Mary Bromfield), who found she could say the magic word "Shazam!" and become a Marvel as well. The Golden Age Mary Marvel remained a teenager in superhero form, while the modern version is transformed into an adult like her brother. The Golden Age Mary Marvel had a different set of patrons from Captain Marvel who contributed to her powers. They were Selene (grace), Hippolyte (strength), Ariadne (skill), Zephyrus (swiftness), Aurora (beauty) and Minerva (wisdom).

During the 2007 and 2008 limited series Countdown to Final Crisis and Final Crisis, Mary Marvel lost her powers and gained the powers of Marvel Family foe Black Adam. She temporarily became a villain working for Darkseid and possessed by the New God DeSaad.

In current DC Comics continuity from 2012 on, Mary Bromfield is Billy Batson's foster sister, having run away from an abusive home at a young age and being placed in the Vázquez home. The oldest of the Shazam kids, Mary acts as the "den mother" and conscience of the group. She shares Billy's secret, and by saying "Shazam!" she can gain a superpowered form similar to the traditional Mary Marvel in a red uniform.

==== Freddy Freeman (Captain Marvel Jr.) ====
In both the Golden Age and 1990s versions of the Marvel Family, Billy's friend and classmate, Freddy Freeman, was attacked and left disabled by the supervillain Captain Nazi, and was given the power to become a Marvel to save his life. Whenever he spoke Captain Marvel's name, Freddy becomes a teenage version of Captain Marvel. This created the odd problem that he could not identify himself without changing back to his regular form.

During the mid-1990s, Freddy was known as CM3 (short for "Captain Marvel Three", "CM1" being Billy and "CM2" being Mary) so that he could identify himself without transforming. He was a member of the Teen Titans during the late 1990s and later, the Outsiders in the early 2000s. The 2006–2008 Trials of Shazam! mini-series featured Freddy gaining the powers of Captain Marvel as Shazam, while Billy took over for the dead wizard Shazam as Marvel.

In current DC Comics continuity from 2012 on, Freddy Freeman (now a blond teenager instead of the traditional black-haired youth, though still physically disabled) is Billy Batson's foster brother, a smart-mouthed pickpocket and trickster whose parents are in prison. He shares Billy's secret and by saying "Shazam!" can gain a form similar to an adult version of the traditional Captain Marvel Jr., in a blue uniform.

==== Eugene Choi ====
Eugene Choi is Billy Batson's foster brother, an intelligent, bookish teenager about Billy's age of Asian descent with a love of technology and video games. Eugene's bookishness is offset by a competitive and impulsive nature that causes trouble for him and the others at times. Introduced in the Flashpoint miniseries, Eugene can share Billy's power by saying "Shazam!" and become an adult Shazam-powered version of himself in a silver/gray uniform.

In addition to the standard Shazam power-set, Eugene has the additional power of technopathy, which allows him to manipulate technology.

==== Pedro Peña ====
Pedro Peña is Billy Batson's foster brother, a teenager of Mexican descent who is around Billy's age. Introduced in the Flashpoint miniseries, Pedro can share Billy's power by saying "Shazam!" and becoming an adult Shazam-powered version of himself in a green uniform. Pedro's adult form, resembling a tall, bearded powerlifter, is a stark contrast to his personal insecurity and shyness. While the comics have yet to make any such distinction, the 2019 live-action feature film Shazam! implies that Pedro is gay or asexual, with him later confirmed to be gay by screenwriter Henry Gayden and also on-screen in Shazam! Fury of the Gods.

In superhuman form, Pedro has extra amounts of super-strength compared to the rest of the Shazam Family, gaining the strength of Hercules.

==== Darla Dudley ====
Darla Dudley is Billy Batson's foster sister, an exuberant African-American preteen who was abandoned by her parents and adopted by Billy's foster parents, the Vásquezes. Despite her hardships growing up, Darla is very openly affectionate and loving towards her foster family and virtually anyone she meets. Introduced in the Flashpoint miniseries (as a teenager the same age as the other kids), Darla can share Billy's power by saying "Shazam!"

She wears a purple uniform, and her speed abilities are amplified, making her faster than the others. She is also unable to keep secrets, which proved rather difficult to overcome.

=== Past members ===
==== The Lieutenant Marvels ====
The Lieutenant Marvels are three other boys named "Billy Batson" (nicknamed "Tall Billy", "Fat Billy" and "Hill Billy"—the last because he was from the Appalachian Mountains — to differentiate themselves from "Real Billy", Captain Marvel) who learned that, because they also were named Billy Batson, they could draw on the power of Shazam. They vowed only to use their power if asked by Captain Marvel, and only if all three were to say the magic word "SHAZAM!" in unison.

Following DC's 2011 New 52 reboot, the Lieutenant Marvels appear as non-superpowered allies of the Marvel Family in the 2015 one-shot comic The Multiversity: Thunderworld, where they, Mister Tawny, and Uncle Marvel help defeat the Monster Society of Evil while Captain Marvel is fighting Doctor Sivana for control of the Rock of Eternity.

==== C.C. Batson & Marilyn Batson ====
Clarence Charles "C.C." Batson (named after Captain Marvel co-creator C. C. Beck) is the biological father of Billy Batson. Billy's biological parents had been alluded to in a handful of Shazam! stories published prior to 1990 under different names. The 1994 graphic novel The Power of Shazam! by Jerry Ordway introduces C.C. and his wife, Billy's mother Marilyn, and how their deaths in that post-Crisis continuity at the hands of Black Adam led to Billy gaining his powers.

In current DC Rebirth continuity, C.C. Batson is still alive, resembling an older Captain Marvel/Shazam with greying hair. As a younger man, C.C. had abandoned Marilyn and Billy when Billy was a toddler and become a grifter. After spending a decade in prison, C.C. returns to Philadelphia to find Billy at the Vazquezes' foster home. When he is attacked by Black Adam and the Seven Deadly Sins, Billy shares his Shazam powers with his father, making him the prophesied seventh and final member of the Shazam Family. However, it is revealed that C.C. Batson had been possessed by Mister Mind since his prison release, who intended to uses the Shazam powers in a plot to unite the Seven Magiclands under his rule. Using a spell, Shazam shrinks himself down small enough to enter his father's ear canal and battle Mind directly. Following Mind's defeat, C.C. loses his powers and is freed from Mind's control, but reveals that he has no intentions of reuniting with his son.

=== Other members ===
These members of the Marvel Family appear in stories set in other worlds or times.

- Capmarv: Bilbat, the champion of Shaz! in the 30th century. A descendant of Billy Batson, Bilbat met his ancestor in 2943 via time travel who helped him unlock his full powers.
- Hoppy the Marvel Bunny is an anthropomorphic rabbit and counterpart of Captain Marvel. He largely appears in his own series, but has occasionally assisted the Marvel Family.
- Shazam Robot: Built by the Marvel Family, the Shazam Robot drove nitroglycerin across dangerous terrain for the Naughton Nitro Co.
- Shazamobile: While not a living creature, the Shazamobile was built by Captain Marvel. It ran on mystic power.
- Whiz: The son of King Marvel and Queen Marvel (Freddy Freeman and Mary Batson-Freeman, respectively) on Earth-22.
- Thunder: The star of The Power of Shazam! Annual 1996, Thunder is the super-powered alter-ego of a young girl from the planet Binderaan, circa 9,000 A.D., named CeCe Beck (or Beck for short). An aged Captain Marvel serves as the girl's mentor the same way Shazam served as his mentor. Whenever Beck speaks the magic words "Captain Marvel", she is transformed into Thunder, an adult super-heroine. After being lost in the timestream, Thunder briefly teamed up with the Legion of Super-Heroes in the 30th century. The names "CeCe Beck" and "Binderaan" are tributes to Marvel Family creators C.C. Beck and Otto Binder.
- Tanist: A teenaged male Marvel who appeared in The Power of Shazam! #1,000,000 (November 1998, part of the DC One Million event). After his mother is killed, Tanist, a disabled resident of Mercury in the 853rd century, meets the aged Captain Marvel in the Rock of Eternity. Marvel grants the boy superpowers to save his life as he had done for Freddy Freeman/Captain Marvel Jr.
- Sahar Shazeen: In the possible future in Justice League: Generation Lost, Sahar Shazeen is the champion of Shazam.
- Bizarro Captain Marvel: Observed briefly in Superman 80-Page Giant (April 2011), Bizarro Captain Marvel is the Bizarro version of Captain Marvel on Htrae. He was pictured with the Bizarro Justice League.
- Mazahs: Wielder of the Dark Lightning, Alexander Luthor was Mazahs of Earth 3.
- Queen Marvel: In the Injustice universe, Regina Taylor gained the power of Shazam as Queen Marvel.
- Wonder Woman: Following the events of Lazarus Planet, Mary Marvel gave her connection to Shazam to Wonder Woman.

=== In other media ===
- For Filmation's The Secrets of Isis, Billy Batson was accompanied by Mentor who offered him guidance. Captain Marvel's benefactors in the Elders (Solomon, Hercules, Atlas, Zeus, Achilles, and Mercury) directly communicated with the pair through the Eterni-Phone.
- DC Nation's Farm League featured a version of Captain Marvel as Shazham.
- In Lego DC Shazam! Magic and Monsters, members of the Justice League were briefly given the powers of Shazam. These included Superman, Batman, Wonder Woman, Flash, and Green Lantern (Jessica Cruz).

== Other versions ==
=== Black Marvel Family ===
The original rendition of the Black Marvel Family.

The Black Marvel Family is a fictional team appearing in American comic books published by DC Comics. The team made its debut in 52 #12, being one of several focuses within the comic book series, with Black Adam serving as the central character. A counterpart to the Marvel Family and based in Kahndaq, the team represents the official royal family of the sovereign nation. Originally, the team was formed to help stabilize Kahndaq, as Isis ushered Black Adam toward a more positive and compassionate approach to his rulership. Despite the team's positive reception in Kahndaq, it was met with skepticism from world leaders and other superhero teams, such as the Teen Titans. After Osiris was framed by Amanda Waller, costing the team its reputation, Osiris and Isis were eventually killed by the Four Horsemen of Apokolips, which included Yurrd, Sobek's true identity. Their deaths led Black Adam to brutally kill the Horsemen and enact World War III. Much later, to atone for his past crimes, he selects his descendant, Malik White, to inherit his powers as a Champion.

Currently, the team consists of Black Adam and Bolt (Malik White). Former members includes Isis (Adrianna Tomaz), Osiris (Amon Tomaz), Sobek, and Black Mary. The team also has several foes, including Sabbac, the Suicide Squad, the Four Horsemen of Apokolips, Doctor Sivana, Ibac, Intergang, and the modern rendition of the Circle of Crows led by Oni Grace.

=== Circle of Eternity ===
The Circle of Eternity (also known as the Council of Eternity or Council of Wizards) is a fictional team of magic users appearing in American comic books published by DC Comics. The spiritual predecessor of the Marvel Family, the Circle of Eternity was one led by Mamaragan (under the honorific of "Wizard Shazam") and served as a found family. Residing in the Rock of Eternity, the Council was responsible for adjucating supernatural matters on Earth and the Seven Magiclands. Eventually, Mamaragan would originally choose Egyptian slave Aman as his champion but his uncle, Mighty Adam, secretly killed him to consolidate Mamaragan's powers unto him and became his champion. After centuries of service, Mighty Adam turns on the Council and kills them all save Mamaragan, who seals him away, christens him Black Adam, and would seek to create a spiritual successor of the group with the Marvel Family in the modern era.

Thus far, the only known members of the Council were the Wizard Shazam and the Apache. They were also allied by the Mighty Adam, Solomon, Hercules, Atlas, Zeus, Achilles, and Mercury. The team also has several enemies, including Mister Mind and the Monster Society of Evil, the Circle of Crows once led by Mereruka and joined by Ibac, and the Seven Deadly Sins.

=== Alternate universe versions ===
In the final issue of 52, a new multiverse is revealed, originally consisting of 52 identical realities. Among the parallel realities shown is one designated "Earth-5", which resembles Earth-S and has a counterpart of the Marvel Family.

== In other media ==
=== Television ===
- The Marvel Family stars in the Shazam! segments of the 1981 Saturday-morning cartoon series The Kid Super Power Hour with Shazam!
- Members of the Marvel Family feature prominently in Young Justice. Captain Marvel (later Shazam) was a notable presence early in the series while Mary Bromfield was featured in the fourth season, becoming Black Mary in the series finale. Black Adam, Uncle Dudley, Mr. Tawny, and Isis also appeared in the series.
- The Marvel Family (Captain Marvel, Mary Marvel and Captain Marvel Jr.) appear in the Batman: The Brave and the Bold episode "The Malicious Mr. Mind!".
- Shazam, Black Adam, Uncle Dudley, and the Wizard appear in Justice League Action.
- The Black Marvel Family is represented by Zari Tomaz and Behrad Tarazi (rather than Adrianna and Amon Tomaz) in Legends of Tomorrow. In the series, they have no connection to Black Adam and rather than transform, they share an amulet that gives them the ability to manipulate wind.

=== Film ===
==== Animation ====
- In Justice League: Crisis on Two Earths, a 2010 animated film produced by Warner Bros. Animation, the Earth-3 supervillain Superwoman is the head of three "Made-Men" named Super Family styled after her own costume, low levels criminals (Each head of the Crime Syndicate has teams of several cronies). She shared her powers with these three men, who resemble Captain Marvel, Uncle Dudley Marvel, and Captain Marvel Jr. They are called Captain Super, Uncle Super, and Captain Super, Jr.
- The Flashpoint universe version of the Shazam Family (Billy, Mary, Freddy, Pedro, Eugene, and Darla) appear in Justice League: The Flashpoint Paradox, the 2013 animated film adaptation of the Flashpoint comic-book miniseries by Warner Bros. Animation.
- Freddy Freeman and Darla Dudley appear in Justice League: War.

==== DC Extended Universe ====
- Billy Batson / Shazam! and both the kid and adult identities of the Shazam Family (Mary, Freddy, Pedro, Eugene, and Darla) featured in the DC Extended Universe feature film Shazam! (2019), produced by New Line Cinema and Warner Bros. Pictures. The film featured Zachary Levi in the title role, Asher Angel as Billy Batson, Grace Fulton and Michelle Borth as Mary, Jack Dylan Grazer and Adam Brody as Freddy, Ian Chen and Ross Butler as Eugene, Jovan Armand and D. J. Cotrona as Pedro, and Faithe Herman and Meagan Good as Darla.
- The Black Marvel Family appeared in Black Adam (2022). In the film, Teth-Adam's son Hurut was chosen as Shazam's champion. However, he sacrificed his life to pass his power onto his father. In the modern day, Adrianna Tomaz and her son Amon (rather than her brother) appeared but did not have powers.
- The Shazam Family appears in Shazam! Fury of the Gods (2023).

=== Video games ===
The Marvel Family, based on the DC Extended Universe incarnation, appears in the Lego DC Super-Villains DLC "Shazam! Movie Level Pack 1 & 2".

== See also ==
- The Marvels
