= Marc Swayze =

American comic book artist

- Born: Marcus Desha Swayze; July 17, 1913 Monroe, Louisiana, U.S.
- Died: October 14, 2012 (aged 99) Monroe, Louisiana, U.S.
- Areas: Writer, Penciller, Artist, Inker, Colourist
- Notable works: Captain Marvel; Mary Marvel
- Spouse: June Bloomer Swayze
- Children: 5

Marcus Desha Swayze, known as Marc Swayze (July 17, 1913 – October 14, 2012), was an American comic book artist from 1941 to 1953 for Fawcett Comics of New York City.

He is best known for his work on Captain Marvel and the Marvel Family during the Golden Age of comic books for Fawcett Comics. He was the co-creator of Mary Marvel, along with writer Otto Binder. The first Mary Marvel character sketches came from Swayze's drawing table, and he illustrated her earliest adventures, including the classic origin story, "Captain Marvel Introduces Mary Marvel" (Captain Marvel Adventures #18, Dec. 1942).

== Biography ==
Swayze was born to Louis Herbert and Mildred (née Turner) Swayze. He graduated from Neville High School in his native Monroe, Louisiana. He attended the Northeast Center of LSU (now University of Louisiana at Monroe) before receiving his degree from Louisiana Tech University in Ruston. He subsequently procured a Master of Fine Arts degree from Northeast Louisiana University (now ULM) where he also taught art.

Swayze was hired primarily by Fawcett to illustrate Captain Marvel stories and covers for Whiz Comics and Captain Marvel Adventures. He wrote many Captain Marvel scripts and continued to do so while he served in the United States Army, which he entered at Fort Oglethorpe in north Georgia during World War II. He played guitar and performed twice with Bing Crosby entertaining troops.

After leaving the military in 1944, he made an arrangement with Fawcett to produce art and stories on a freelance basis from his home in Monroe, where he created both art and storylines for The Phantom Eagle (Wow Comics), as well as drawing the "Flyin' Jenny" newspaper strip for Bell Syndicate (created by Russell Keaton). After Wow Comics ceased publication, Swayze produced artwork for Fawcett's top-selling line of romance comics, including Sweethearts and Life Story. After the company ceased publishing comics, Swayze switched to Charlton Publications, from which he ended his comics career in the middle 1950s. He was then hired by Olin Mathieson to establish the art department for the company's packaging division.

In an interview in 2000 with the Monroe News Star, Swayze describes his philosophy of developing comics as the utilization of "art in storytelling so that even a child who couldn't yet read could get a story out of it." An oil painter and former semi-professional league baseball player, Swayze wrote a column containing his memoirs, carried in Alter Ego magazine, from 1996 until his death, under the title, We Didn't Know It Was the Golden Age!

== Family and death ==
Swayze and his wife, the former June Bloomer, reared five children in Monroe. He was elected to the Ouachita Parish School Board, and was vice commander of the American Legion.

He died October 14, 2012, in Monroe at age 99. In addition to his wife of 66 years, he was survived by his three daughters, a son, and four grandchildren. The fifth child is not mentioned by name in the obituary, presumably having predeceased his or her parents. Services were held on October 17, 2012, at the First United Methodist Church of Monroe. Interment was at Riverview Cemetery in Monroe.
