= Mary Marvel =

Comic book superheroine

- Mary Marvel as depicted in The New Champion of Shazam! #3 (January 2023). Art by Jen Bartel.

Publication information
- Publisher: Fawcett Comics (1942–1953); DC Comics (1972–present)
- First appearance: Captain Marvel Adventures #18 (Dec. 1942)
- Created by: Otto Binder; Marc Swayze

In-story information
- Alter ego: Mary Batson / Mary Bromfield
- Species: Human
- Team affiliations: Justice League; Marvel / Shazam Family; Black Marvel Family; Super Buddies
- Partnerships: Shazam; Captain Marvel Jr. Wizard Shazam; Hippolyta
- Supporting character of: Shazam
- Notable aliases: Captain Marvel; Lady Shazam; Black Mary; Shazam
- Abilities: Divine empowerment; Superhuman physical attributes: strength, speed, durability, etc.; Enhanced intelligence and knowledge; Limited physical and magical invulnerability; Divine-derived willpower; Control over lightning and magic

Altered in-story information for adaptations to other media
- Team affiliations: Sentinels of Magic
- Notable aliases: Sergeant Marvel
Mary Marvel
Publication information
- Publisher: Fawcett Comics
- Schedule: Monthly
- Format: Ongoing series
- Genre: Superhero
- Publication date: December 1945 – September 1948
- No. of issues: 28
- Main character: Mary Marvel
Creative team
- Written by: Otto Binder
- Artist: Jack Binder
- Editor(s): Mercedes Shull, Ralph Daigh

Mary Marvel, also known as Lady Shazam and Shazam, is a superheroine originally appearing in American comic books published by Fawcett Comics and now by DC Comics. Created by Otto Binder and Marc Swayze, she first appeared in Captain Marvel Adventures #18 (cover-dated Dec. 1942). An ancillary character of Shazam, she is among the earliest known female contemporary of a male superhero in comic books.

While her alter ego is Mary Bromfield, her origin and background have been retroactively altered throughout her publication history. In classical stories, she is the fraternal twin sister of Billy Batson (born Mary Batson), separated from him at a young age and adopted by the Bromfield family, relatives of the Batsons. After being reunited with her brother, she discovers that she possesses powers similar to his but derived from a different set of goddesses, becoming a superhero of Fawcett City alongside Billy and Captain Marvel Jr., the latter occasionally serving as her love interest, as the three form part of the Marvel Family. Modern stories instead portray Mary as the oldest foster sibling of Billy Batson, having come from an abusive household before being taken in by the Vazquez family. She initially receives her powers from Billy alongside the rest of the Shazam Family. Later stories establish her as the Wizard Shazam's Champion of Magic and then her powers instead being granted through Hippolyta and a female pantheon of goddesses, similar to earlier continuities.

Mary Bromfield and her superhero alter-ego both made their cinematic debut in the DC Extended Universe 2019 film Shazam! played by Grace Fulton and Michelle Borth respectively, and the former returned in the 2023 sequel Shazam! Fury of the Gods playing both parts. She also appears in the Young Justice animated television series, voiced by Erika Ishii and is alternatively referred to as Sergeant Marvel.

== Publication history ==
=== Fawcett Comics ===
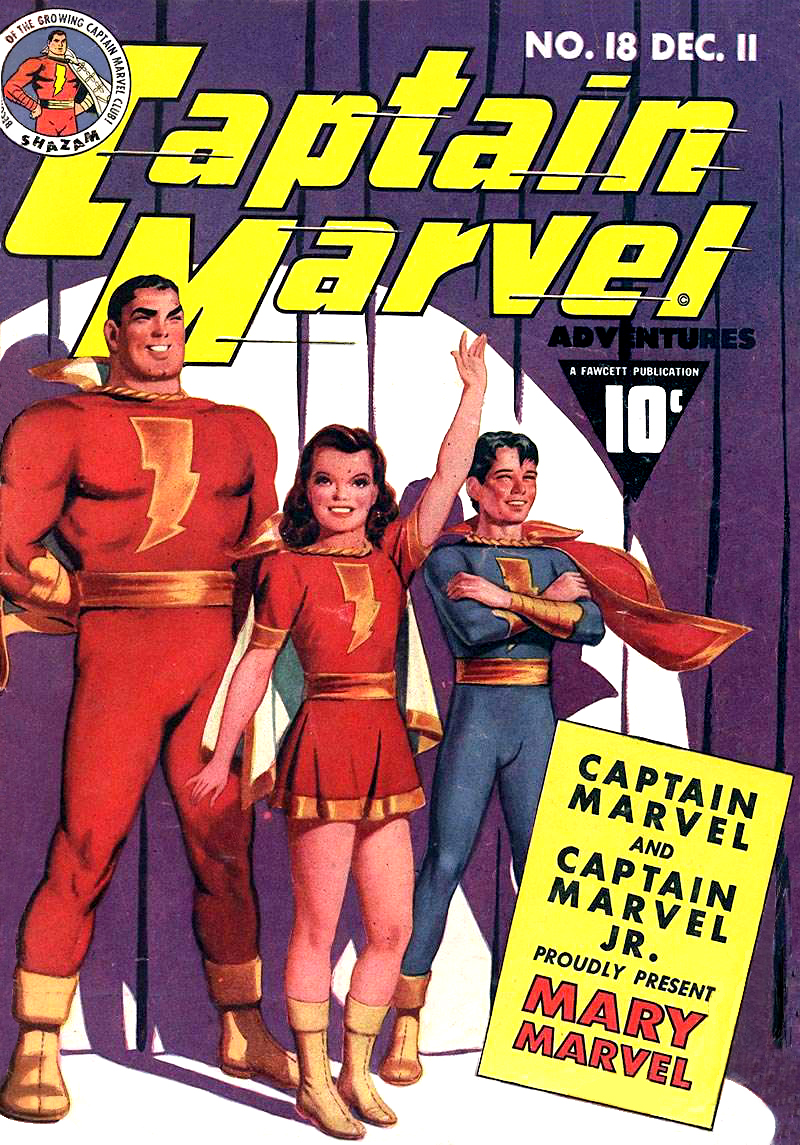
The first appearance of Mary Marvel, from Captain Marvel Adventures #18 (1942). Art by C. C. Beck.

Mary Marvel was introduced into Fawcett Comics' Marvel Family franchise a year after a young male counterpart, Captain Marvel Jr., made his debut. Artist Marc Swayze based Mary Marvel's design and personality upon American actress Judy Garland. Mary was introduced in Captain Marvel Adventures #18 as Mary Bromfield, a girl who discovers she is the long lost twin sister of Captain Marvel's alter ego Billy Batson.

In Superhero Comics of the Golden Age, Mike Benton writes:

Rod Reed, the executive editor of Fawcett comics at the time that Mary Marvel was created, recalled that, originally, the letter "S" in Shazam was to have stood for Sappho. Rather than give his young heroine the questionable powers of a Greek poet from the isle of Lesbos, Reed suggested that Selene, goddess of the moon, might be a more wholesome choice.

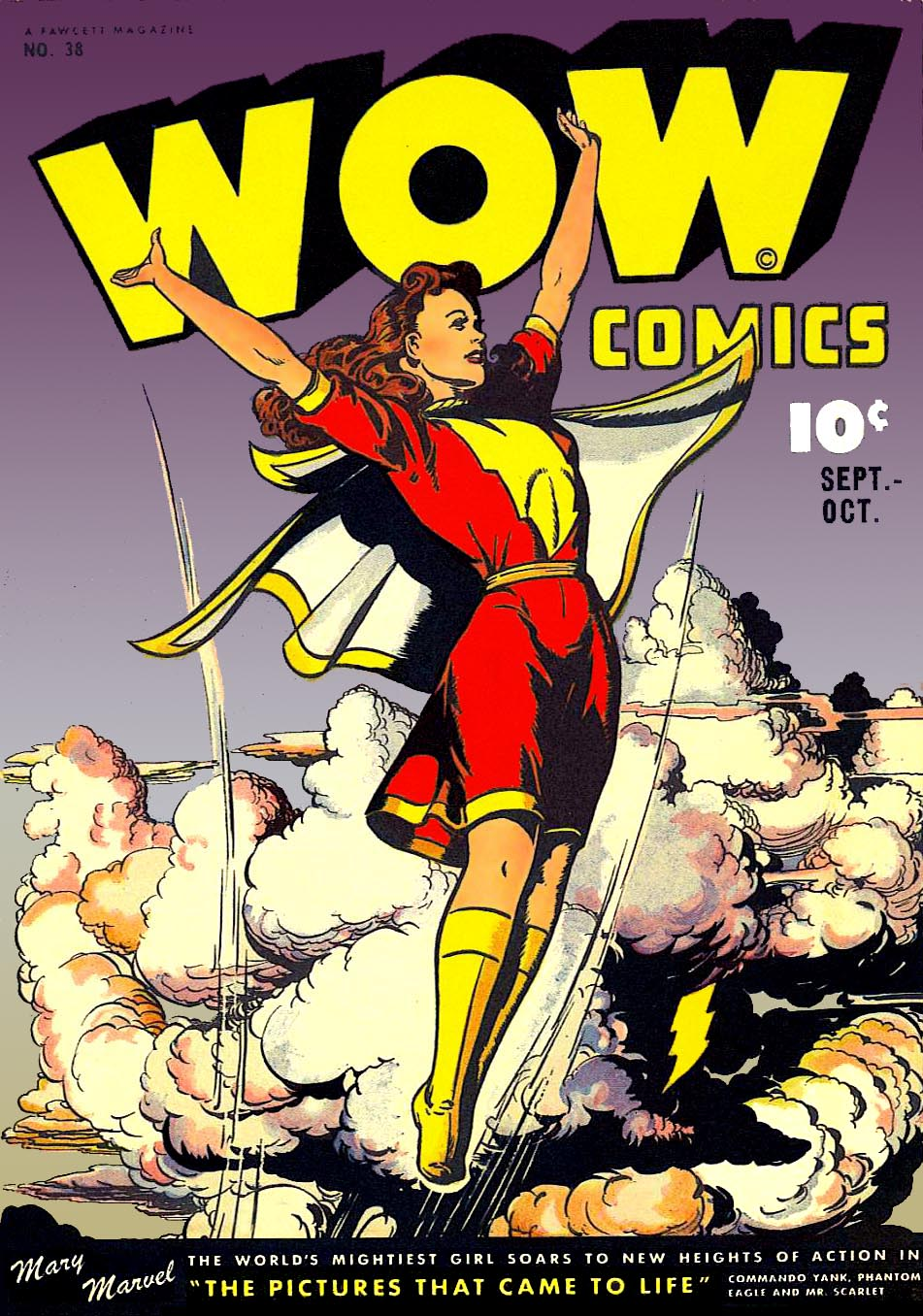
Mary Marvel on Wow Comics #38 (1945). Art by Jack Binder.

Soon after her introduction, Mary Marvel headlined Wow Comics, and by 1945 had her own Mary Marvel book. She also appeared in The Marvel Family book with Captain Marvel and Captain Marvel Jr. In her solo adventures, Mary soon gained sidekicks in her kindly Uncle Marvel, who was not actually her uncle nor a Marvel, and his similarly nonpowered niece, Freckles Marvel. Uncle Marvel was eventually made the Marvel Family's manager, and also served as Mary's guardian.

Just before the Marvel Family's adventures ceased publication in 1953, Mary Marvel's costume and appearance were altered: the neckline of her blouse was lowered slightly, her hair was shortened, and she now wore yellow slippers instead of the customary Marvel Family yellow boots. After Fawcett canceled their superhero comics line because of a copyright infringement lawsuit with National Comics (later DC Comics), Mary Marvel hosted a puzzle page drawn by C. C. Beck on page 33 of Mysteries of Unexplored World issue 1 (Charlton Comics August 1956). After that, Mary and her teammates went unseen for years.

=== DC Comics ===
==== 1973–1985 ====
In 1972, DC Comics licensed the rights to the Marvels, and a new comic series called Shazam! began. Mary, Cap, and Junior appeared in both new stories and reprints of their classic stories. According to Shazam! #1, the Sivanas had put the Marvel family into suspended animation for 20 years, along with themselves (by mistake) and much of the supporting cast. The comic book was canceled by 1978, and the Shazam! stories were relegated to the back pages of World's Finest Comics (from 1979 to 1982) and Adventure Comics (from 1982 to 1983). After the 1985 Crisis on Infinite Earths miniseries, Captain Marvel's origin was rebooted in the Shazam: The New Beginning miniseries in 1987. The Marvel Family was written out of the Shazam! mythos, and neither Mary Batson nor Mary Marvel appeared in DC Comics for several years.

==== 1994–1999 ====
Mary Batson was reintroduced in The Power of Shazam! graphic novel by Jerry Ordway in 1994. An ongoing series followed in the next year, and Mary Marvel was introduced into the modern DC Universe with a new origin story in Power of Shazam! #4.

When calling upon her powers, Mary is transformed into an adult resembling her late mother (in the same way that Billy resembles his father when in Marvel form). Mary shares the title of Captain Marvel with her brother. Various characters in the series distinguish the two by gender when addressing them, addressing Mary as "the lady Captain Marvel".

At first, Mary's costume was the same as her original one. However, beginning with Power of Shazam! #28, Mary donned a white costume to distinguish herself from her brother. The color change was retained for most future uses of the character during the next decade.

==== 2000s ====
After the Power of Shazam! series ended in 1999, Mary's superpowered alter ego was officially rechristened "Mary Marvel." In 2002 she had lunch with Supergirl in "The Clubhouse of Solitude", in the spoof graphic anthology "Bizarro Comics". Since then, she has guest-starred in both Superman and Supergirl comics. In 2003, Mary became a member of an offshoot of the Justice League known as the Super Buddies in the Formerly Known as the Justice League miniseries, which juxtaposed her Golden Age-era personality with the modern-day world for comic effect.

Mary Marvel appears briefly in several stories relating to DC's 2005–2006 Infinite Crisis crossover. Mary also appeared in DC's weekly limited series 52, with her most substantial appearance being in 52 #16 as the maid of honor at the wedding of Black Adam and Isis, two Shazam!-related characters. She was defeated by Black Adam during World War III (DC Comics) along with the other Marvels.

In 2006, DC began a revamp of the Shazam! mythos with Judd Winick and Howard Porter's Trials of Shazam! limited series. The series began with a preview within the pages of Brave New World #1 in June 2006, in which Mary Batson loses her powers, suffers a three-mile fall, and falls into a coma. This set up Mary's appearances as a main character in Countdown, a weekly DC series which served as the successor to 52. During the course of the series, head writer Paul Dini and his collaborators had Mary acquire the powers of Black Adam, which give her a new look including a form-fitting long-sleeved black uniform and skirt with black lace-up boots. While the series tracked the character's struggle between good and evil, due to manipulation by Eclipso and Granny Goodness (promotional material for the series used the catchphrase "Seduction of the Innocent," a reference to Fredric Wertham's book of the same title), Mary emerged from the series under the influence of Darkseid.

This darker Mary Marvel appears in DC's 2008 crossover series Final Crisis, written by Grant Morrison and illustrated by J. G. Jones, as a Female Fury, with another design change (to match the styles of the other Furies) and a fully evil personality due to possession by DeSaad. Though defeated by Freddy Freeman/Shazam before the end of the Final Crisis miniseries, the evil Mary appeared again in the "Black Adam and Isis" arc featured in Justice Society of America (vol. 3) #23–25, by the end of which she has lost her powers and returned to being a normal teenage girl.

==== 2010s ====
In 2011, following its Flashpoint company-wide event, DC made sweeping continuity changes to some comic book series and minor ones to others, as part of its relaunch event "The New 52". Captain Marvel, now known as Shazam, received a new origin story as part of a Shazam! backup feature by writer Geoff Johns and penciler Gary Frank, published between 2012 and 2013 in the relaunched Justice League comic series. Mary does not feature in the new continuity until Justice League #8 (2012), and is not transformed into a superhero for the first time until Justice League #21 (2013), when Billy directs his powers into her, Freddy, and their foster siblings Darla, Pedro, and Eugene during a fray with Black Adam.

Mary was largely absent from the main DC Universe for several years after Justice League #22 in 2013. Versions of Mary Marvel from alternate earths in the DC Multiverse appeared in events such as The Multiversity in 2014 and Convergence in 2015. In December 2018, Geoff John and artist Dale Eaglesham launched a new Shazam! ongoing comic series, featuring Mary alongside Billy Batson and the rest of the Shazam Family. The first issue of the new volume of Shazam! also featured a manga backup focused on Mary by Geoff Johns and Mayo "SEN" Naito.

== Fictional character biography ==
The Marvel Family #78 (1952), featuring Mary Marvel's then-new look. Art by Kurt Schaffenberger.

=== Original Fawcett origin ===
Mary Marvel's first appearance in Captain Marvel Adventures #18 also relayed her origin story.

As infants, twins Billy and Mary Batson were nursed by a woman named Sarah Primm. When the Batsons' parents die in a car accident, Primm was required to send both children to an orphanage. However, Primm is determined to at least give one of the children a home, and arranges for Mary to secretly take the place of another baby girl who had suddenly died while under Primm's care. As a result, Billy is sent to an orphanage while his sister is raised by the wealthy Mrs. Bromfield.

Several years later, Billy Batson becomes a teenage radio announcer. While hosting an on-air quizbowl, he receives an urgent letter from Sarah Primm, now on her death bed, requesting his presence. Billy goes to see her during a break, and Primm tells him the secret of his long-lost sister. To help him find Mary, Primm gives Billy a locket broken in half and tells the boy with her last breaths that Mary wears the other half.

After the quizbowl broadcast is over, Billy tells his best friend Freddy Freeman about his sister and the locket. Billy then recalls that one of the quizbowl contestants, a rich girl named Mary Bromfield, wore a broken locket. He and Freddy trail Mary's limousine in their superpowered forms of Captain Marvel and Captain Marvel Jr. and find themselves called into service to save Mary from a gang of kidnappers.

Captain Marvel then learns that Mary's locket matches his own, and that she is indeed Billy's sister. The Marvels reveal their secret identities to Mary, who wonders if, since she is Billy's twin, she could become a Marvel by saying the magic word "Shazam". Billy, however, is assured that "Old Shaz—er—you know who—wouldn't give his powers to a girl!"

Just then, the kidnappers awaken then bind and gag Billy and Freddy, preventing them from saying their magic words. Mary exclaims that Billy cannot say "Shazam", inadvertently saying the word herself. She is then struck by a magic lightning bolt and transformed into a super-powered version of herself, later christened "Mary Marvel" by her brother. She defeats the thugs by herself, discovering that she is bulletproof and has super strength, and frees Billy and Freddy. Shazam later reveals the goddesses Mary derives her powers from.

=== Modified DC origin ===
Mary Marvel in her white uniform in Formerly Known as the Justice League #1 (2003). Art by Kevin Maguire and Josef Rubinstein.

Mary Marvel's updated DC origin was presented in the Power of Shazam! graphic novel and ongoing series, written by Jerry Ordway.

Prominent archaeologists C.C. and Marilyn Batson are assigned by the Sivana expedition on an excursion to Egypt. They take along their young daughter Mary, but are forced to leave their son Billy in America with C.C.'s half-brother. The elder Batsons are killed by their associate Theo Adam, who then kidnaps Mary. Upon Theo Adam's return to the United States, Adam's sister, a maid named Sarah Primm, takes Mary into her care. Primm arranges for her childless employers, Nick and Nora Bromfield, to illegally adopt Mary. As Mary Bromfield, the young girl grows up living an idyllic life in a wealthy family, but continuously has dreams of another family with a brother she has never seen.

Meanwhile, Billy eventually finding himself on the streets, and is given the power to become Captain Marvel. He learns that Mary is still alive, but after four years of searching, neither he nor his benefactor, the wizard Shazam, can find the girl. The only thing Billy has to remember Mary by is her favorite toy, a "Tawky Tawny" doll, which was shipped to America with the Batsons' possessions after their murders.

As a young teenager, Mary enters a regional spelling bee held in Fawcett City and emceed by Billy, who works as an on-air reporter for WHIZ radio. After saving Mary from kidnappers twice as Captain Marvel, Billy notices how much Mary Bromfield reminds him of Mary Batson and has an undercover cop named "Muscles" McGinnis retrieve the girl's forged adoption record. Learning that Mary is indeed his sister, Billy tries to figure out a way to let Mary know he is her brother. The old "Tawky Tawny" doll suddenly transforms into a full-sized humanoid tiger and comes to life, instructing Billy to take it to Mary. As Captain Marvel, Billy flies out to the Bromfields' hometown of Fairfield to deliver the doll and the adoption papers to Mary.

Captain Marvel arrives at the Bromfield estate and changes back to Billy Batson to deliver the package, but is immediately kidnapped by the thugs who helped Primm forge Mary's adoption records. Mary, not having seen Billy, takes the package and opens it, discovering the adoption records and the Tawky Tawny doll. Once again, the doll comes to life and instructs the bewildered girl to say the magic word "Shazam" and save her brother. Mary complies and is transformed by a bolt of magic lightning into a superpowered doppelganger of her deceased mother. She saves Billy, who transforms into Captain Marvel to help Mary defeat the thugs, but the two Marvels cannot save Sarah Primm, who is murdered by one of the thugs.

=== The Trials of Shazam! and Countdown ===
In the eleven page preview to Judd Winick and Howard Porter's Trials of Shazam limited series appearing in DC's Brave New World one-shot comic (June 2006), Mary Marvel loses her powers in mid-flight as an after-effect of the death of the wizard Shazam by the Spectre in Day of Vengeance #6, and falls from a height of three miles. Mary survives the fall but goes into a coma, and Freddy Freeman, who lost the power to become Captain Marvel Jr. in the same way, has her transported to a hospital in New York City where he can keep watch over her. He spends all his money to help her.

In Countdown #51, Mary is released from the hospital. She finds that she is still powerless and a note left by Freddy Freeman with a nurse asks her not to look for him as he is trying to get the powers of Shazam back, per the orders of Marvel. Making her way to Gotham City (despite being warned by Madame Xanadu to avoid the place in Countdown #50), Mary stumbles upon the former Kahndaqi embassy while being chased by violent criminals from the subway, who are killed by Black Adam. Black Adam angrily threatens her. Mary tells Adam how much she valued her powers and how she desires to regain them. Adam, bitter over the loss of his wife Isis and brother-in-law Osiris during the events of 52 as well as his failure to resurrect the former, gives Mary his powers instead of killing her and she is christened "Black Mary".

After her powers proved corruptive and led to rejection from Zatanna, the monks of Nanda Parbat, and others vying to usurp her powers or, she relinquishes it in a decisive attack against Eclipso and lands in Themyscira. Hippolyta later enlists her aid in revealing Granny Goodness's deception, who posed as Athena to use the Amazons to create a new iteration of the Female Furies. While battling Granny Goodness and Mad Harriet, Mary begins believing she is hearing the voices of the gods. The group manages to free the Olympian gods from an Apokoliptan chamber, and Mary Marvel's powers are restored along with her white costume, which now has a gray lightning bolt and long sleeves. After journeying with the Challengers to Earth-51 and witnessing the Great Disaster occurring there, Mary finally returns home to find Darkseid waiting for her. Reminding her of how strong she felt using Black Adam's powers, and claiming the gods do not trust her as much now, he returns them to her, restoring her black costume. She then confronts Donna Troy, Kyle Rayner, Forager, and Jimmy Olsen, seizing Jimmy to take him back to Darkseid. When Donna questions Mary's use of the powers, Mary insists that she is not evil, merely "driven". After Darkseid's defeat, Mary returns to Black Adam, asking to be a part of a new Black Marvel Family. Adam refuses Mary, who decides to become a solo superheroine.

=== Final Crisis ===
Mary Marvel, possessed by DeSaad, battles Wonder Woman in interior art detail from Final Crisis #3 (of 7), September 2008. Art by J. G. Jones.

Mary returns in Final Crisis, still apparently in Darkseid's thrall, wearing a new black costume with more of a punk look. She attacks Wonder Woman, scratching the Amazon's upper arm and infecting her with an unknown virus delivered from a broken glass vial bearing a gold Omega symbol. Later, when the heroes of Earth attack Blüdhaven, Black Adam notes that she has been possessed by one of the New Gods, a "leering old man". The possessed Mary claims to have a new dirty magic word, a blasphemous name of power, and to have new gods. During a heated battle with Supergirl, Black Adam learns that the evil god DeSaad possessed Mary. Black Adam tries to kill her but is stopped by Freddy. Later, distracted by hordes of Anti-Life followers about to attack, Freddy Freeman, the new Captain Marvel, grabs Mary and uses the last of his magic to transform them back to normal. Though horrified by her actions while possessed by DeSaad, and saying, while crying, that she never meant for this to happen, she is seen standing with Freddy with clubs in their hands, awaiting the end of the world.

=== Justice Society of America ===
After the end of the Crisis, Mary is recruited by Black Adam and Isis, who have taken over the Rock of Eternity from its former caretaker the wizard Shazam by defeating Captain Marvel and stealing his powers, using the magic scarab Shazam used to take Black Adam's powers. During a battle between Black Adam, Isis, and the Justice Society, who had been summoned by Billy, the evil Mary Marvel abducts a powerless Billy Batson and forces him to become a teenage Black Marvel by sharing her powers and forcing him to say "Mary Marvel".

The two now evil Black Marvels join Adam and Isis, who are intent on using the power of Shazam to destroy the modern world, in fighting the Justice Society. When Isis begins attacking the citizens of Adam's native Kahndaq and Adam's friend Atom Smasher, he switches loyalties and joins the Justice Society's Flash and the spirit of Mary and Billy's father in helping resurrect the wizard Shazam from the Rock of Finality, where he has been sealed in stone. Black Adam gives up his powers to restore the wizard to life. Shazam promptly and angrily takes his powers back from Mary, Billy, and Isis, turns Teth Adam and Isis to stone, and closes off all contact to the Rock of Eternity to the Batson kids upon stating that Billy and Mary failed him. He also threatens to go after Freddy for stealing his name. The two Batsons are later seen wandering the streets of Fawcett City, homeless, and wondering what happened to their father's spirit.

Mary and Billy are briefly seen during the events of Blackest Night, now living in an apartment in Fawcett City. While watching news reports of the various heroes and villains being reanimated as Black Lanterns on their laptop, Mary remarks how scary it is to not have her powers anymore.

Mary is approached by Blaze, who offers to restore her and Billy's powers in exchange for her killing Freddy. Mary seems to go along with the deal, appearing to poison Freddy. However, when Blaze arrives to claim Freddy's powers, he gets up and attacks her. With a little help from Mary and Billy, Freddy defeats Blaze and sends her back to hell, later promising them that he will find a way to restore their lost powers.

=== The New 52/DC Rebirth ===
The DC Universe was rebooted in 2011 with the New 52 line of comics. In the current continuity, Mary appears as Mary Bromfield, making her debut in Justice League (vol. 2) #8 in 2012. She is the oldest kid living in the Vázquezes' foster home, along with Billy Batson, Freddy Freeman, Eugene Choi, Darla Dudley, and Pedro Peña. Whether or not this Mary is still Billy's long-lost sister is not yet known.

Mary was the second child placed with the Vázquezes, having run away from an abusive home at a young age. Polite and well-mannered, Mary functions as the unofficial "den mother", looking after her foster siblings. When Billy arrives at the Vázquez home and gains the power to become Shazam, he shares his powers with his foster siblings. By saying the magic word "Shazam!" Mary can become an adult superhero with a red uniform similar to that of the traditional Mary Marvel. Later, after Mary loses her powers, she is re-gifted divine abilities by various female deities, making her empowerment separate to Billy's. Her new patron deities are Selene, Wonder Woman's mother Hippolyta, Artemis, Zephyrus, Aurora, and Minerva.

== Powers and abilities ==
Although her powers have changed in sources over time, Mary is often empowered by divine entities to be granted a host of powers. As a ordinary human, she is highly intelligent and keen in some fields of sciences, which includes biology and medical science. Her powers allows her to switch between her human and demigod-like form by saying the magic world ("Shazam") to incur a transformation. Most prominently, Mary has been empowered by a female set of goddess connected to the Greek pantheon. While empowered by them, her powers include:

Goddess pantheon
S	(Grace/Agility) of Selene	Granting her enhanced agility, Mary's abilities allows her to be a superb gymnast while in her empowered form.
H	Strength of Hippolyta	This attribute blesses her with exception superhuman strength, classical stories allowing her to lift a house effortlessly and is on par with Shazam (then Captain Marvel) in strength.
A	Stamina of Artemis / Skill of Ariadne	Originally, the specific attribute the Skill of Ariadne remained unspecified. It was later replaced by Stamina of Artemis during Lazarus Planet. This instead grants her superhuman stamina.
Z	(Flight/Fleetness) of Zephyrus	This attribute grants Mary superhuman speed and flight, allowing her to fly at faster than a "speeding plane" and the "speed of light" in classic stories. Modern stories has her speed capable of moving faster than Zeus's lightning bolt.
A	(Invulnerability / Beauty) of Aurora	This attribute bestows Mary Marvel invulnerability and superhuman durability; classical stories allow her to be bullet-proof, resist extreme temperature such as those exhibited from lava and temperatures up to 1,974,230,469,989 degrees Fahrenheit, withstand the pressure of the deep sea, immune to the effects of drugs, and survive in space unaided.
M	Wisdom of Minerva	Similar to the Wisdom of Solomon, Mary is granted an enhanced awareness and knowledge. While classical stories has this attribute grants powers such as enhancing her ability to teach, speak Atlantean, and some spell-casting, modern stories allows her to astral project.
Additionally, in classic stories, Mary Marvel displays additional powers wherein the attribute associated is unknown: among those abilities includes time travel, resistance to mind control, and to conjure and manipulate lightning. The properties of her magical lightning also surpasses and can reflect ordinary lightning.

She has also been similarly empowered by Billy Batson, gaining powers through his pantheon, for a significant portion of her publication history following Crisis on Infinite Earths and into the post-Flashpoint continuity. Drawing from Greek, Roman, and Israeli mythology of gods and renown legends, she would share powers with the Marvel Family. For a brief time, she also became the Champion of Magic after Billy was displaced into the Rock of Eternity, retroactively becoming the Wizard Shazam's champion and enhancing her powers until she relinquished the powers to Wonder Woman to help her oppose Hera. Her powers include:

Traditional pantheon
Wisdom of Solomon	The Wisdom of Solomon grants the individual several abilities, including perfect memory, strategic combat skills, exceptional mathematical aptitude, charisma in interpersonal interactions, limited clairvoyance for acquiring arcane knowledge and intuitive insights, as well as a natural fluency in all languages. Unlike some other powers, this is considered an active one a champion must channel to activate. In some stories, this power also allows the ability to hypnotize people.
Strength of Hercules	This bestows Mary an exceptional level of superhuman strength, allowing her to exert immense physical power, effortlessly lifft and manipulate objects of tremendous weight, overpower adversaries with ease, and deliver devastating blows in combat. Mary Marvel's level of strength is on par with formidable characters such as Supergirl and Captain Atom.
Stamina of Atlas	The stamina attribute from Atlas enables May to maintain his empowered state for an extended period without any time limitations. Additionally, the empowerment provides Mary with sustenance, eliminating the need for eating, sleeping, and even breathing. As a result, Mary can operate at peak efficiency, unaffected by the physiological requirements that typically apply to ordinary individuals. This extraordinary stamina allows him to fully focus on his heroic duties without the distractions or limitations associated with physical sustenance.
Power of Zeus	Zeus's "power" attribute facilitates the transformation that grants Billy access to the full range of his powers, including the ability to shoot bursts of electricity and lightning. He also possesses a limited gift of teleportation, allowing him to effortlessly travel to and from the Rock of Eternity with a single thought. Notably, the Power of Zeus empowers him with the potential to use magic and cast spells. This power is considered the most difficult, requiring the most study, focus, and discipline.
Courage of Achilles	The Courage of Achilles grants Mary peak physical defenses, rendering her nearly invulnerable. This heightened level of invulnerability provides significant protection against physical harm. Additionally, the empowerment grants Mary resistance to various elements, including heat, force, disease, and the effects of aging. This attribute allows him to withstand extreme conditions and maintain his health and vitality against formidable challenges. In some stories, it also grants fighting prowess.
Speed of Mercury	The Speed of Mercury grants Mary super speed, enhanced reflexes, motor skills, and flight, enabling him to move at incredible speeds, react swiftly, perform precise maneuvers, and soar through the air.

=== Weaknesses ===
in most versions of the character, her empowerment was of the same pool of power as the Shazam Family; When the members of the Shazam Family are using their powers at once, they each have only a fraction of said powers and is only at their strongest when individually using the power. Following her recent re-empowerment, she no longer has this limitation.

== Reception ==
Mary Marvel has been analyzed as a portrayal of women in American comics, specifically how her physique and costumes serve as examples of masculinity vs. femininity and the objectification of women in comics.

== Other versions ==
=== Black Mary ===
Mary Marvel acquires Black Adam's powers in Countdown #47 (June 6, 2007).

Black Mary is the darker, alternate identity used by Mary. The first instance of her adopting the identity appears after re-gaining the after gaining the powers of Shazam from Black Adam as opposed to the Wizard Shazam. Outfitted in a different form-fitting costume, the character is portrayed darker and angrier in character. In addition to possessing Black Adam's powers, she also manipulates a variant of magic known as the "living magic", granting her powers more akin to a sorceress and encompasses a wide range of powers, including transmutation, manipulation of time, heightened mystic senses, and the conjuring of lightning.

After gaining her new-found powers, she searches for a tutor at the advice of a reformed Riddler; Klarion the Witch Boy attempts to steal her power, Zatanna initially agrees but rejects her and banishes her from the Shadowcrest Mansion following a scuffle due to her lust for power, and she is rejected by the monks of Nanda Parbat. She forges a reluctant alliance with Eclipso, who attempts to offer Mary to Darkseid as his court magician and concubine, claiming to Mary that such as position would make her suited to undermine him at a later point. After escaping Darkseid and a brief intervention with Eclipso, Mary battles her as her true objective of gaining her power is revealed. Understanding she has been corrupted by Black Adam's power, she uses the transformation lightning to defeat Eclipso and relinquish her power but lands in Themyscira, where she meets Queen Hippolyta, who remarked she had relinquished her divine powers since their last encounter and the darkness within her.

=== Alternate universe versions ===
- An alternate universe version of Mary Marvel appears in JLA Classified.
- An alternate universe version of Mary Marvel appears in 52.
- An alternate universe version of Mary Marvel appears in Shazam! The Monster Society of Evil. This version only a fraction of her brother's powers and remains a child in her powered form. During a battle against Black Adam, she briefly gains an adult form, only to lose it shortly after.
- An alternate universe version of Marvel Marvel appears in Tangent Comics. This version is one of three heroines (the others being alternate versions of Madame Xanadu and Lori Lemaris) who masquerade as an anarchic but heroic prankster named The Joker.
- An alternate universe version of Mary Marvel appears in DC Comics Bombshells. This version is Miriam Bätzel, a Jewish woman and descendant of the wizard Shazam whose powers are derived from Biblical figures Shiphrah, Huldah, Abigail, Zipporah, Asenath, and Miriam.
- An alternate universe version of Mary Marvel appears in Flashpoint alongside Billy, Freddy, Eugene, Darla, and Pedro as they all possess the combined powers as Captain Thunder.

== In other media ==
=== Television ===
- Mary Marvel appears in The Kid Super Power Hour with Shazam!, voiced by Dawn Jeffory.
- Mary Marvel appears in Batman: The Brave and the Bold, voiced by Tara Strong. This version initially lives with the Bromfield family before Batman helps her reunite with Billy Batson and she joins the Marvel Family.
- Mary Bromfield appears in the fourth season of Young Justice, voiced by Erika Ishii. This version is known as Sergeant Marvel and is initially a member of the Sentinels of Magic before leaving after being accused of being power-hungry and being refused the opportunity to participate in Zatanna's rotational agreement with Nabu. Subsequently, Granny Goodness tempts her into joining the Female Furies as Black Mary. Additionally, the character was intended to appear earlier in the series, although this did not come to fruition.

=== Film ===
==== Animated ====
- Superwoman, an alternate universe version of Mary Marvel, appears in Justice League: Crisis on Two Earths.
- Mary Marvel makes a non-speaking appearance in Justice League: The Flashpoint Paradox.
- Mary Marvel appears in Lego DC Shazam! Magic and Monsters, voiced by Jennifer Hale.
- Mary Marvel appears in Justice League: Crisis on Infinite Earths.

==== Live action ====
- Mary Bromfield appears in the DC Extended Universe film Shazam!, portrayed by Grace Fulton as a teen and Michelle Borth as an adult. This version is the oldest of Billy Batson's foster siblings who is later given powers to help him fight Doctor Sivana and the Seven Deadly Sins.
- Fulton reprises her role as Mary in Shazam! Fury of the Gods, now also portraying her adult form. In the film, after her brothers drift apart and have personal interests, Mary comforts Billy knowing that he will be leaving the foster system, just like her, and that everyone has to accept their ways and that nothing lasts forever. After Freddy is kidnapped by the Daughters of Atlas, Hespera, Kalypso, and Anthea, Mary and the Shazam Family are locked in a dome along with the city, and all of them except for Billy are drained of their powers by Kalypso. However, Wonder Woman eventually repairs the Wizard's staff, restoring their powers.

=== Web series ===
- An African-American version of Mary Marvel was set to appear in Justice League: Gods and Monsters Chronicles before its cancellation.
- Mary Marvel makes non-speaking appearances in DC Super Hero Girls.

=== Video games ===
- Mary Marvel appears as a character summon in Scribblenauts Unmasked: A DC Comics Adventure.
- The DCEU version of Mary Bromfield/Mary Marvel appears as a playable character via DLC in Lego DC Super-Villains.

=== Miscellaneous ===
- Mary Marvel appears in Justice League Unlimited #20.
- An imaginary version of Mary Marvel appears in Teen Titans Go! #45.
- Mary Marvel appears in Justice League Beyond. This version was fused with Billy Batson, the wizard Shazam, and Black Adam under unspecified circumstances, with only one of them being able to exist at a time.
- Mary Marvel hosted a puzzle page drawn by C. C. Beck on page 33 of Mysteries of Unexplored World issue 1 (Charlton Comics August 1956).
