= Black Adam =

Comic book antihero

- Black Adam's design for the 2022 Black Adam comic series. Art by Rafa Sandoval.

Publication information
- Publisher: Fawcett Comics (1945); DC Comics (1972–present)
- First appearance: The Marvel Family #1 (December 1945)
- Created by: Otto Binder and C. C. Beck

In-story information
- Alter ego: Teth-Adam
- Place of origin: Kahndaq
- Team affiliations: Injustice League; Legion of Doom; Secret Society of Super Villains; Black Marvel Family; Monster Society of Evil; Injustice Society; Justice League; Justice Society of America
- Partnerships: Isis (Adrianna Tomaz); Wizard Shazam; Hero partners: Atom Smasher; Bolt (Malik White); Villain partners: Doctor Sivana; Seven Deadly Enemies of Man
- Supporting character of: Shazam
- Notable aliases: Khem-Adam, Theo Adam, Hassan Bari, Champion of Kahndaq
- Abilities: Superhuman physical attributes: strength, speed, durability, etc.; Enhanced intelligence and knowledge; Physical and magical invulnerability; Control over lightning and magic; Highly skilled warrior, tactician, and martial artist

Black Adam (Teth-Adam) is a fictional character appearing in American comic books published by DC Comics. He was created by Otto Binder and C. C. Beck, and first appeared in the debut issue of Fawcett Comics' The Marvel Family comic book in December 1945. Since DC Comics licensed and acquired Fawcett's characters in the 1970s, Black Adam has endured as one of the most popular archenemies of the superhero Shazam and the Marvel Family alongside Doctor Sivana and Mister Mind.

Black Adam was originally depicted as a supervillain and the ancient magical champion predecessor of the champion Shazam, who fought his way to modern times to challenge the hero and his Marvel Family associates. Since the turn of the 21st century, however, Black Adam has been redefined by DC Comics writers Jerry Ordway, Geoff Johns, and David S. Goyer as an ancient Kahndaqi and corrupted antihero who fiercely defends his homeland from foreign interference with brutal tactics. He came from a fictional Middle Eastern country named Kahndaq, located at the southern tip of the Sinai Peninsula, and was portrayed as a hero who liberated his homeland from slavery. Featured roles in such comic book series as Justice Society of America, Villains United, Infinite Crisis, and 52 have elevated the character's prominence in the DC Universe, culminating with DC's 2021 line-wide Infinite Frontier relaunch, wherein he joins the Justice League. In 2009, Black Adam was ranked as IGN's 16th-greatest comic book villain of all time.

Black Adam has been substantially adapted into media outside comics, including animated series, films, and video games. He has been voiced by John DiMaggio, Gary Cole, Joey Naber, and Fred Tatasciore, among others. Dwayne Johnson voiced Adam in DC League of Super-Pets and later portrayed him in the live-action film Black Adam.

== Publication history ==
=== Fawcett Comics ===
The canon version of Black Adam appeared only once during Fawcett's initial publication run of Captain Marvel comics. In The Marvel Family #1, Black Adam is introduced as an ancient Egyptian named Teth-Adam (i.e., "Mighty Human"), who serves the wizard Shazam. Deciding that he should transfer his powers and responsibilities to a younger successor, Shazam chooses Adam due to his presumed moral purity. This story is reprinted in DC's Shazam! #8 (1973), which is his first appearance in the Bronze Age.

Black Adam's origin, as seen in The Marvel Family #1 (1945). Art by C. C. Beck and Pete Costanza

When Teth-Adam says the magic word "Shazam", he is transformed into "Mighty Adam". Originally, the wizard Shazam grants Adam powers derived from ancient Greco-Roman deities; later in the series, it was changed to ancient Egyptian deities.

The overwhelming magical power of his new form corrupts Teth-Adam, and he deposes the pharaoh, seizes his throne, and vows to conquer and rule all of humanity. Angered by this betrayal, Shazam renames his errant champion "Black Adam". Unable to take back the power he has bestowed, the old wizard instead crafts a spell to banish Adam to the furthest star in the universe.

Black Adam spends the next 5,000 years flying back to Earth. By the time he makes it back, in 1945, Shazam has appointed three new champions to take his place: Captain Marvel, Captain Marvel Jr., and Mary Marvel. Adam's attempts to take over the world cause the Marvels to seek counsel with Shazam, who tells them about Black Adam. Adam succeeds in gagging Billy and Freddy while they are talking to Shazam. He then ties them up, planning to kill them later. Uncle Marvel releases them while Mary battles Black Adam, enabling them to transform.

Adam does battle with the trio, known as the Marvel Family, but since all are equally invulnerable, the fight goes on without resolution. The non-powered Marvel Family member Uncle Marvel gets an idea from Shazam and tricks Adam into saying "Shazam," reverting him to Teth-Adam. As he is no longer immortal, he dies and crumbles into a skeleton. Black Adam's costume is almost identical to Captain Marvel's—except that Black Adam's costume is black and golden yellow, instead of red and golden yellow.

=== DC Comics ===
==== Pre-Crisis ====
Though Adam is defeated in the same story which he debuted, the DC version of Adam is resurrected and revitalized nearly 30 years later in Philadelphia by Doctor Sivana's reincarnation machine in DC Comics' revival of the Marvel Family characters. He then destroys the machine so it cannot be used against him, much to Sivana's annoyance.

According to Shazam! #28 (Black Adam's first "Bronze Age" appearance, but second actual appearance, after The Marvel Family #1) Black Adam gets his powers from Shu (stamina), Heryshaf (strength), Amon (power), Zehuti (Thoth) (wisdom), Anpu (speed), and Menthu (courage). Black Adam accidentally time-travels back to 1776 while going to the Rock of Eternity to destroy Shazam at Sivana's request, as Sivana felt Adam's powers would be wiped out as well, but Captain Marvel accidentally throws him back in time. He and Captain Marvel battle, during which Black Adam realizes he will have to do something drastic and tricky to defeat Marvel. Adam gets his transformative lightning to strike Captain Marvel, transforming Captain Marvel back to Billy. He then seizes Billy and covers his mouth before he can finish saying his magic word, "SHAZAM!".

He then flies to a nearby ship where he obtains a length of rope which he uses to bind and gag Billy, after which he throws him into the sea. However, Billy swims to the surface, and is rescued by a colonist rebel, and freed. He realizes the rebel is Paul Revere before returning to his own time. Adam comes to Captain Marvel to exact revenge, when during a short battle, Adam is once again tricked by Captain Marvel into saying "Shazam". Adam then gets amnesia as a result of a powerful punch from Captain Marvel.

After that, Black Adam is also involved with Karmang in the All-New Collectors' Edition #C-58 (Black Adam's third appearance, but second new appearance in the Bronze Age) and tries to destroy both Superman and Captain Marvel.

After several more defeats at Captain Marvel's hands, Adam joins Mister Mind's Monster Society of Evil, which mounts an assault on the Rock of Eternity. Oggar summons an army from the sands and dust of Egypt for Adam to lead after muting Billy with his magic. He and Oggar are beaten after Mary Marvel tricks Oggar into transforming Billy, but escape. The Monster Society then attacks the Rock of Eternity itself, but Captain Marvel Jr. tricks Black Adam into transforming back, then knocks him out.

When last seen during Crisis on Infinite Earths, Adam was fighting the heroes on the five remaining and partially merged Earths.

== Fictional character biography ==
=== The Power of Shazam!: revised origin ===
(Left to right) Blaze, Shazam, and Black Adam, on the cover of The Power of Shazam! #10 (1995). Art by Jerry Ordway

Black Adam is reintroduced to the DC Universe in The Power of Shazam! graphic novel by Jerry Ordway in 1994 (an earlier Post-Crisis version of the character appeared in Shazam!: The New Beginning but this appearance is not considered canonical). In that story and the subsequent Power of Shazam! ongoing series, Adam is a deadly and evil adversary for Captain Marvel.

In this revised origin, Teth-Adam was born on September 11, 1279, BC as a son of the ancient Egyptian Pharaoh Ramesses II. Teth-Adam impresses one of the high priests, the wizard Shazam, with his good deeds. The young man is chosen to become the hero "Mighty Adam" by speaking the name "Shazam", an acronym for the gods who give him power: the stamina of Shu, the swiftness of Heru (Horus), the strength of Amon, the wisdom of Zehuti (Thoth), the power of Aton, and the courage of Mehen. He does not draw powers from Shazam due to the demoness Blaze making a deal with the Egyptian god Set.

The Mighty Adam serves as Egypt's champion for many centuries until he falls under the influence of Blaze. The bewitched Adam storms the palace of the pharaoh, murdering him and his entire court, and declares himself ruler. The wizard learns of this and strips Adam of his powers, encasing them in a mystical scarab necklace. Adam's depowered body rapidly experiences the aging process that the magic had staved off, and the former hero withers away into a dried cadaver in seconds. Shazam buries both the body and the scarab in Ramesses' tomb, where he plans for it to remain for all eternity. In death, the former hero is referred to as "Khem-Adam" ("Black Adam"). Disillusioned by what he perceived as Adam's betrayal, Shazam waits several millennia before appointing a second champion to fight evil in his name.

During the late 20th century, an unscrupulous archaeological aide named Theo Adam is assigned to the Malcolm Expedition, financed by the Sivana Foundation to excavate the tomb of Ramesses II. Adam uncovers Khem-Adam's tomb in a secret passageway, and leads his superiors, C.C. Batson and his wife Marilyn, to the discovery. Upon first sight of Khem-Adam's scarab, Theo Adam becomes obsessed with the artifact and kills both Batsons to steal it. Escaping Egypt, Theo Adam soon made his way back to America.

The Batsons' son, Billy, has been left behind in the United States, and is drafted by Shazam to become the wizard's second champion, Captain Marvel. When Theo Adam first encounters Captain Marvel, he notes both Marvel's identical appearance to C.C. Batson and the lightning-bolt insignia on Marvel's chest that had also decorated Khem-Adam's tomb. Adam therefore has a revelation and realizes that he is a reincarnation of Khem-Adam. Grasping his stolen scarab, Adam speaks Shazam's name and is transformed into the super-powered Black Adam.

Black Adam reveals himself to Captain Marvel as the Batsons' killer, and the two battle. Captain Marvel emerges victorious by snatching Adam's scarab, and therefore his power, away from him. However, he then saves him from being crushed by a falling building. Marvel brings Theo Adam to Shazam, who wipes Adam's memory and takes away his voice, so that he cannot access his powers. This solution proves temporary, as Blaze re-enters her former lover's life and helps restore his voice, memory, and powers.

=== JSA series: Black Adam reforms ===
Although Adam appears during the Power of Shazam! ongoing series' first year of publication as a villain, towards the end of the series' run, Adam returns and announces that Black Adam and Theo Adam are separate personalities. Black Adam agrees to stand trial for murdering the Batsons, and is acquitted when it is revealed that his fingerprints do not match those of Theo Adam.

The reformed Black Adam is still vulnerable to his murderous host's influence, and he attacks the Justice Society of America under Theo Adam's control in JSA #6 (1999). In subsequent issues, Adam joins supervillain Johnny Sorrow's Injustice Society after Sorrow removes a malignant tumor from Adam's brain. He is sent to battle Wildcat, and easily defeats him, showing how easily he could kill him by taking him about 25,000 feet above the ground—just high enough for them to talk while unable to go any higher without the human Wildcat freezing or suffocating—explaining the different ways he could kill him, and asking what he will give for his life.

He shows him the Rock of Eternity where Sorrow has turned Shazam to stone with his cursed face that usually kills those that see him; he also makes contact with the Spectre, who provides them with additional information. Adam soon betrays Sorrow, and he and the JSA defeat the Injustice Society. Black Adam briefly gives Flash the speed of Heru enabling him to defeat Johnny Sorrow by hitting him at near-lightspeed when he is paralyzed after Doctor Mid-Nite showed Sorrow a previously recorded image of his own face, sending him from Earth to another dimension.

Flash meets Black Adam in the past, where he has been sent due to the great speed he traveled, and again uses his speed, this time to return to his own time. After the Flash returns, Adam helps the JSA battle the Sin-Eater, a Thanagarian demon. Claiming to be free of Theo's evil influence again, a repentant Adam requests membership in the Justice Society, and is granted a probationary membership in JSA #21 (2002).

During their tenure on JSA, writers Geoff Johns and David S. Goyer redefined Adam's personality and background, focusing on the character's old-fashioned and militant ideals of justice, and his officious and strongly opinionated attitude. Despite this, he has stated on many occasions that he respects the Justice Society, particularly members such as Jay Garrick. Several other JSA members are shown to be skeptical of Adam's reformation; primary among them is the Atom Smasher, who later becomes Adam's close friend after Adam sympathizes with his decision to kill the near-immortal Extant to save his mother.

The writers also created added tension in the book by having Captain Marvel, who is wholly unconvinced that Adam has reformed, join the team. One JSA story arc (issues 39 through 44) features Marvel, Hawkgirl, and Mr. Terrific venturing back in time to ancient Egypt, where they meet the Mighty Adam before his corruption. During this visit, the Mighty Adam is grateful to meet Captain Marvel, unaware of his future villainy; when Marvel reverts into Billy Batson, the champion expresses admiration for the young man's ability to handle the power of Shazam at such a young age, something he doubts he could have achieved himself.

After returning to the present, Marvel notes that he has a better understanding of Adam's motives now after learning about the loss of Adam's family. His choice of words, however, angers Adam and causes him to lash out emotionally. Adam then states that while he respects Marvel as an equal, that does not mean he considers him a friend.

Johns and Goyer used this story arc to slightly alter Adam's origin. The hero now hails from the fictional west Asian nation of Kahndaq, not Egypt, although he serves the Egyptian prince Khufu (who is later reincarnated as JSA member Hawkman). The character of Blaze is completely removed from the origin story, and Adam's rage is described as having resulted from the conquest of Kahndaq (and the murder of his wife and children) at the hands of a magically powered supervillain named Ahk-ton (whose powers resemble the future hero Metamorpho), who is working with the notorious immortal Vandal Savage. The Mighty Adam kills Ahk-ton during the struggle and returns to Kahndaq to reclaim it by any means necessary, including murder. The wizard Shazam does not agree with Adam's actions, and robs Adam of his powers and kills him.

=== JSA: Black Reign ===
In JSA #45 (2003), Black Adam and his teammate Atom Smasher both defect from the Justice Society, expressing dissatisfaction with the team's refusal to cross certain lines. During the next few issues, Adam forms his own organization, which administers justice the way Adam wants it: "an eye for an eye". His roster includes a mix of DC heroes and villains, including Atom Smasher, Brainwave (who is possessed by Mister Mind), Northwind and the rest of the society of Feithera, Nemesis, and former JSA museum curator Alex Montez, the human host of the demon Eclipso. Adam's collective executes Kobra, a villain who has been acquitted by the legal system (albeit because his followers had threatened to blow themselves up if he was not released) when the JSA could have spared them his escape and the hassle of a trial by simply killing Kobra when he was first captured. Adam then turns his attentions to his old homeland of Kahndaq, now ruled by a militant dictator whose actions had long been ignored by the United Nations.

Late 2003 began the publication of a JSA/Hawkman crossover story arc titled "Black Reign", written by Geoff Johns alone, which features Adam and his militia's hostile takeover of Kahndaq. A war soon breaks out, with Adam, his comrades, and the Kahndaqi people on one side, and the Justice Society on the other. The dictator is finally killed by Atom Smasher. By the end of the arc, the JSA leaves Adam in control of Kahndaq, provided that he does not leave its borders, convincing him that he cannot enforce his rule on the world or he is no better than the dictator he had defeated.

Brainwave is saved by the JSA, Mister Mind is apprehended thanks to the Atom infiltrating Brainwave's head—as part of an undercover mission to confirm whether Adam was brainwashing his comrades—and Nemesis and Alex both die during the battle when Alex loses control of Eclipso. Only Northwind and Atom Smasher remain at Adam's side, with Atom Smasher later leaving when a time-travelling clash with Degaton results in him meeting Al Pratt in the 1950s and re-evaluating his past motivations.

As Kahndaq's ruler, Adam is depicted as fiercely working to protect his people and his nation, although his arrogance is still a handicap; when the Spectre attacked Kahndaq after being corrupted by Eclipso, Adam actually told his people that the JSA were also their enemy because he did not want to give his people the impression that he needed help to protect them, despite the fact that he was clearly outmatched by the Spectre's power.

=== Infinite Crisis ===
Black Adam is featured heavily in DC's 2005 Infinite Crisis crossover, primarily in the Villains United miniseries as a member of the Secret Society of Super Villains (which he only joins to protect Kahndaq from the Society). Concurrently, in JSA, Atom Smasher leaves Adam's side to return to the JSA.

The Society is run by Alexander Luthor Jr., a character from the alternate world of Earth-Three, who disguises himself as the Lex Luthor of the Post-Crisis Earth. The Infinite Crisis limited series centers around Alexander Luthor's plan to restore the Multiverse. Needing a member of the Marvel Family to power the apparatus he has designed to recreate the alternate Earths of the Multiverse, Luthor has the Society betray and capture Black Adam. With the help of the mind-controlling powers of Psycho-Pirate, Luthor is able to control Adam and have him call down the Shazam magic lightning bolt to fuel the apparatus.

The Spectre's rampage during the Day of Vengeance storyline reverts all magic in the universe to a raw, chaotic structure. The death of the wizard Shazam has transformed Luthor into a tether that can be used to harness magic, allowing him to use any member of the Marvel family to power his equipment if the wizard's name is spoken. By the end of the miniseries, Black Adam is freed by Superboy and Nightwing. Adam quickly kills Psycho-Pirate and, following a failed attempt to defeat Superboy-Prime, he is transported to Earth-5 when he is punched too far from the Tower by Superboy-Prime. He joins the heroes in the Battle of Metropolis, destroying Amazo shortly after his arrival.

=== 52 ===
Textless cover of 52 #45 (March 2007). Art by J. G. Jones.

Black Adam appears as a featured character in DC's weekly 52 comic book. Depicted as the violent protector of Kahndaq, Adam kills several supervillains in public and on television to demonstrate his views. As a result, he is distrusted by the superhuman community.

In 52, DC introduces Adrianna Tomaz, the "most beautiful slave from Egypt" offered to Adam by Intergang as a token to curry his favor, along with $2,000,000 in African gold. Black Adam sends Intergang a message by killing Noose and Rough House and sending the rest of the Intergang members home, leaving Adrianna behind.

During Week 10, he creates an international metahuman coalition against the perceived metahuman supremacy of the United States. He gets members of the Great Ten of China and Russia's Rocket Reds, among others, to join the coalition. Adrianna begins to counsel him and stays as a refugee. She makes him a ruler who shows more mercy and performs charitable acts.

In Week 12 of the series, Adam gains a magical amulet, hidden on the scarab in which Shazam imprisoned him. With help from Captain Marvel, who first thinks Adam is trying to attack him, he transforms Adrianna into the superheroine Isis.

Four weeks later, in Week 16, he proposes with a jewel given to Cleopatra by Caesar, and the two are married, with Captain Marvel and the rest of the Marvel Family as witnesses, Mary as bridesmaid. Renee Montoya and the Question prevent a suicide bomber, a child sent by Intergang, from ruining the wedding. For this they are awarded the country's highest honor, the Order of the Scarab, by Black Adam, although he is furious to find Montoya is missing the ceremony while sleeping with a Kahndaqi woman from sorrow over killing a child.

In 52 Week 23, Black Adam and Isis, with the assistance of the Question and Montoya, find Isis's brother Amon, who has been injured and rendered paraplegic due to a failed escape attempt. To save his life, Adam bestows a portion of his own power on the boy, as Captain Marvel did for Captain Marvel Jr. Isis's brother then becomes a new addition to the Black Marvel Family under the name Osiris. They help the Marvels beat the demonic Sabbac using their lightning strike on Halloween when he tries to sacrifice children to the demon Neron while several stories high. He is then moved to an unknown location. The Black Marvel Family also has a charity dinner with Venus Sivana, during which Osiris first meets a talking crocodile (whom Osiris names Sobek).

Osiris is accepted into the Teen Titans. Upon returning from a mission, he and the rest of the Black Marvel Family are attacked by the Suicide Squad. The Black Marvels defeat the Squad, but not before footage of them in battle (including Osiris's accidental killing of a Squad member who was attacking Isis) is captured by Amanda Waller, who uses it to further ruin the Black Marvel Family's reputation. Meanwhile, Kahndaq is struck by a number of natural disasters, which seem to have a supernatural origin. He engages in more beneficial activities, like a charity dinner with the Sivanas.

Wracked with guilt over the death of the Persuader, Osiris ventures to the Rock of Eternity and pleads with Captain Marvel to have his powers removed, as he fears Black Adam's influence (and those of his gods) has tainted him with evil. Adam arrives and the two battle until subdued by Isis and the Marvels. Osiris relents, seemingly accepting that he has repented enough for the Persuader's death, and accompanies the Black Marvel Family back home.

When Osiris and Sobek are alone, Osiris admits that he was only putting up a front to appease those around him and that he could never forgive himself for killing anyone, as Black Adam has. Sobek advises Osiris that he should say Adam's name and rid himself of the powers he has come to hate. Osiris does so, only to be betrayed and killed by Sobek.

Isis and Adam confront Sobek after finding Osiris's body, who reveals that he is Famine, the Fourth Horseman of Apokolips, one of four creatures created by Intergang to attack Black Adam. Adam swiftly disposes of Sobek by elongating his jaws and does battle with the other three Horsemen. One of them, Pestilence, infects Isis with a deadly disease before Adam kills him and his partner War. A gravely ill Isis saves Adam from Death using her powers to send Death into the sky with a geyser of lava and tells Adam with her dying breath that she was wrong to try to change his views on justice, and that he should avenge both her and Osiris.

==== World War III ====
After the funeral in honor of his family, Adam attacks the neighboring Intergang-associated nation of Bialya in search of Death. Sick with grief over the death of his family, Adam proceeds to exterminate the entire population of Bialya in his hunt for his target. Upon confronting his family's killer, the enraged Adam battles a greatly enhanced Death, who has been feeding on the slaughter of Bialya's population. Despite his enhanced strength, Death is defeated by Adam with a barrage of mystic lightning. While torturing Death for an entire day, Adam learns the identity and whereabouts of the Horsemen's masters, flying off to Oolong Island in search of the Science Squad.

He easily gets past their defenses, even a weapon equivalent to the meteorite that killed the dinosaurs proving incapable of stopping him. Adam is subdued by the scientists, who projected a dimensional field into his mind the size of a football field, rendering him powerless. They then use an electro-crown to re-route his body's impulses and hold him as a prisoner. Dr. Sivana tortures Adam for weeks using the electrical crown, which only serves to enrage Adam further, who vows to tear them all apart.

The "Science Squad" makes a worldwide announcement that they plan to sell Black Adam as a living weapon to the highest bidder, resulting in the Justice Society assaulting the island to free Adam. It is revealed that Chang Tzu had built the Horsemen under orders of China, who wanted Adam and his family to be assassinated after Adam withdrew from the Freedom of Power Treaty. Adam refuses to be taken into custody for the destruction of Bialya, despite the requests of Atom Smasher, once more flying off to seek revenge for the death of his family.

Enraged to the point of madness, Black Adam launched a week-long attack against the heroes of the world, referred to afterward as "World War III". Tearing across the globe, Adam destroys many historical landmarks, including the Leaning Tower of Pisa and the Egyptian pyramids in his battle with dozens of superheroes who attempt to stop him. After fighting and defeating the Marvel Family, the Global Guardians, the Doom Patrol, and the Teen Titans, resulting in the deaths of Young Frankenstein and Terra, Adam's path of destruction eventually moves through China. Adam's sustained assault prompts the Great Ten to allow the Justice Society and a coalition of other American metahumans onto Chinese soil in an attempt to stop Adam.

Captain Marvel pleads with the Egyptian gods to stop Black Adam's rampage, but the gods laughingly inform Marvel that Adam has their blessing. Although he failed to remove Adam's powers, Captain Marvel gathers with a group of mystics, including Zatanna and the Phantom Stranger, to work a spell which would allow him to use his powers to transform Adam back to his human form instead of himself. Green Lantern (Alan Scott) and Power Girl restrain Adam as they dragged him into the lightning's path, but the resulting blast tears him from their hands.

Teth-Adam, once again human, escaped with the aid of the Atom Smasher, who carried him to safety after saving him from his fall. After Adam was de-powered, Marvel also changed Adam's magic word with his abilities as the new guardian of the Rock of Eternity, keeping it secret to prevent him from ever regaining his powers. Left mortal, Adam wandered the Middle East, attempting to guess the word that would restore his power.

=== Countdown/Black Adam: The Dark Age ===
Black Adam's quest to gain his powers back between the events of 52 and Countdown was depicted in a six-issue miniseries entitled Black Adam: The Dark Age, published from late 2007 to early 2008. Sometime after his defeat in World War III, Adam gathers a small band of Kahndaqi men who still remain loyal to Adam and sneaks into Kahndaq in disguise to retrieve the bones of Isis. The men kill the guards at the tomb and get Isis's remains.

Most of Adam's men are killed in a battle with a band of soldiers waiting for Adam at the tomb, but Adam manages to escape with Isis's remains. When the Justice Society later arrives at the scene following the shootout, Atom Smasher finds Isis's left ring finger and wedding ring, which Adam accidentally dropped during his escape. One of Adam's loyal servants, Hassan, the last one surviving, offers himself as food to Adam to help him survive across the mountains.

Adam takes Isis's bones to a Lazarus Pit in the Himalayas with the intentions of using it to resurrect her, but cannot complete the process without either using all of Isis's bones (including the missing ring finger) or her magical amulet, which has gone missing. He makes his way to Doctor Fate's tower looking for the amulet, and finds the supervillain and sorcerer Felix Faust, who was trapped in the tower by Ralph Dibny during 52. Faust reveals to Adam that Mary Marvel and Captain Marvel Jr. broke Isis's amulet into several pieces and scattered them across the globe.

Realizing that Isis is powerful enough to free him from the tower, Faust agrees to help Adam locate the pieces of the amulet. He enacts a spell that allows Teth-Adam to transform into Black Adam by drawing from the residual magic in Isis's bones, with Adam using her name as a magic word. However, Faust warns Adam to use his powers only when necessary, lest Adam drain all of Isis's remaining power and make her resurrection impossible.

Using a homing signal etched into his hand by Faust, Adam sets out across the globe hunting down the pieces of Isis's amulet. At the same time, the Justice Society is working with the Marvels to perfect a way of using the Shazam lightning bolt to track Black Adam and bring him to justice. In addition, a hired team of armed vigilantes covertly funded by the U.S. and several other nations is hunting Adam as well, and have developed an "Eternity bullet"—manufactured from shards of the Rock of Eternity—which can penetrate Adam's skin and kill him.

Despite these challenges, Adam is able to retrieve all of the pieces of Isis's amulet (and Atom Smasher meets with Adam in secret to give him Isis's ring finger, though he keeps the ring to himself). Adam spends the entire quest reciting the names of streets, signs, locations, moods, and emotions in hopes of stumbling upon his new magic word. At the end of his quest, Teth-Adam walks into a Fawcett City malt shop and orders a chocolate egg cream—only to find that "chocolate egg cream" is what Captain Marvel changed his magic word to.

With his powers restored, Adam flies to Fate's Tower and confronts Faust. He tells Faust that if he crosses him, he will come after them. Faust attempts to resurrect Isis and apparently succeeds, but the resurrection fails, and Isis's bones crumble to the floor after swearing eternal hate on her husband. Faust blames Adam for using Isis's power too much, and distraught, Adam flies away, ending up in Gotham City. It is, however, revealed that the bones that Faust showed to Adam belonged to Ralph Dibny, and Faust resurrects Isis. With her under his power, Faust creates a door, and exits the tower.

In Countdown #47 (June 2007), a de-powered Mary Marvel who is being chased by criminals stumbles upon Black Adam, hiding out at the former Kahndaqi embassy in Gotham City, kills the criminals, and she finds that he has killed several others that have had the misfortune to find their way into the building. It appears that Adam is about to harm Mary as well as he starts strangling her, but instead, he transfers all of his powers to her (including those he recovered from Isis). He departs in his mortal form after she frees him from a wall that has toppled on him.

=== Final Crisis ===
Black Adam is featured in Final Crisis #5, assisting a small group of Earth's heroes, many of whom he fought before, in battling against Darkseid's forces. Adam battles Mary Marvel and perceives a "leering old man" inside of her. He attempts to kill her but is stopped by Tawky Tawny and Shazam (Freddy Freeman). Adam is subdued by enemy forces.

=== Justice Society of America ===
A brooding, disparaged Black Adam appears in Justice Society of America (vol. 3) #16 (2008), hiding in the tomb of Isis and Osiris and killing potential looters, along with sleeping in the coffins. He reveals through narration that the whole meaning of his power transfer to Mary Marvel was the hope that her innocence would eventually force Mary into surrendering back his power to him, but changed enough to allow Isis's rebirth. After the attempt failed, Adam returned to his state of mourning and anger. Adam's mourning is cut short, however, when he discovers a bloodied flower in his shrine, believing it a sign from Isis.

Despite her powers and consciousness being heavily sedated by Felix Faust's spells, Isis manages to use her powers to create a trail of flowers (including a batch in the shape of the Shazam magic lightning bolt symbol) to lead Adam to where Faust has been holding her captive. Finding Isis and freeing her from Faust's control, Black Adam then journeys to the Rock of Eternity and battles Billy Batson (now Marvel, the wizard of the Rock of Eternity, rather than Captain Marvel), using the same scarab necklace that once imprisoned him to strip Billy of his powers, with help from Isis sending lightning at Marvel and using them to take control of the Rock of Eternity. Isis plans to use the power of the Rock to "cleanse the earth" of all of humankind, which she sees as irrevocably evil. Adam and Isis are even able to convince Mary Marvel to join their crusade. The Black Marvels are soon challenged by the Justice Society, who has come to the aid of the powerless Billy Batson when he was trying to summon Freddy. During the course of the fight, the combatants end up in Kahndaq, where the people praise Adam's return. Isis then kills several of the followers, claiming that they are tainted by this new Earth. Adam attempts to protect his people, only to be attacked by Mary and Billy, who had been tainted by Mary's power. At that point, Jay Garrick (who had earlier been thrown by Isis into the mists surrounding the Rock of Eternity) appears with the spirit of Billy's father, and Shazam, whom the two had recovered from the Rock of Finality, where he had been imprisoned in a statue. Adam is convinced to return his power to Shazam, so that he could save Isis from her corruption. In turn, Shazam—who is furious at the misuse of the power he behest on his champions—takes the power from Isis, Billy, and Mary, and transforms Teth-Adam and Adrianna into statues. Sometime later, a shadowy figure appears in a bolt of lightning, gloating that Shazam has given him new champions to play with.

After the Blackest Night storyline, the resurrected Osiris returns to Kahndaq, vowing to restore the kingdom to its former prosperity. Osiris takes the petrified bodies of Adam and Isis and flies off to an unknown destination. After failing to revive Adam and Adriana, Osiris enlists in Deathstroke's new team of Titans in hopes of finding a way to save them. He has been told to resurrect Isis, but not Adam, which he does by killing people with his lightning by saying Isis.

=== The New 52 (2011–2016) ===
In The New 52 (a 2011 reboot of the DC Comics universe), Black Adam was mentioned by Dr. Sivana while listening to witness reports of the wizard Shazam. Sivana mentions that Adam was a slave summoned to the Rock of Eternity and granted immense powers, using them to protect Kahndaq from the Seven Deadly Sins before vanishing. During Sivana's explanation, drawings of Adam are shown in a historical text, displaying a slightly different look from his previous incarnations. Sivana and his research team discovered the tomb of Black Adam (located approximately 45 miles north of Baghdad). He uses his new-found magic eye inside of some ruins to read a magical runes / inscriptions that make the wall explode, releasing Adam from his tomb. Adam is then shown in a revamped version of his original costume, which includes a cape, hood, and a metallic belt instead of a sash. His lightning bolt appears as an opening into his body with magical energy visibly inside of him.

In Black Adam's subsequent pursuit of Shazam, Billy is shown the beginning of Adam's origin. It centers around the story of Aman, a Kahndaqi boy sold into a life of slavery and abuse. Thinking that he can surely relate and connect with another boy who has suffered like he has, Billy (without hearing the rest of the tale) rushes to Adam and tries to reason with him. To his surprise, Adam simply grabs him and tells him he "knows nothing".

Black Adam shows Billy the rest of his origin, which reveals that Aman had an uncle (who helped Aman escape slavery), whose name was Adam. Adam was injured during their escape, and when Aman was chosen by the wizard to be his champion, Aman shared his power with Adam to heal him. However, while Aman wanted to use his new power for justice and to "cure" his former enslavers of their evil souls, Adam only sought vengeance against those who had enslaved them. To this end, when Aman called down the lightning, Adam seemingly killed Aman so that he himself was the sole recipient of the wizard's power. However, the details of Aman's "death" are not shown, leaving his fate open to speculation. Adam refers to Aman's "sacrifice" and tells Billy that he will go to any lengths to "free this world from those who enslave it".

In the finale of Shazam's origin story, Black Adam holds Billy's foster siblings hostage and demands he give up his power, or they will die. But instead of giving Adam his power, he shares it with his foster siblings, empowering them as "Shazams", as well. Together, they fight Adam and the "host" that the seven sins have inhabited. Eventually, the collateral damage endangers civilians, so Billy orders them to save the people while he alone battles Adam. He finally realizes that his knowledge of his newly acquired powers cannot defeat Adam, who has much more experience using his magic, and decides to change back into his child form. As normal teenager Billy, he challenges Adam to also change (into Teth-Adam) to make it a "fair" fight. Upon doing so, Teth-Adam realizes too late that without immortality, his body can now age, and he instantly crumbles into dust as the centuries catch up to him.

During the Forever Evil storyline, revolutionaries in Kahndaq use an ancient scroll to attempt to revive Black Adam so he will be their champion once again to save them from their oppressive ruler. A man named Amon begins to read the ancient spell, but before he can complete it, the military attacks them. Amon, injured, makes his sister Adrianna complete the spell, which revives Adam. He proceeds to defeat the military forces and kills the Kahndaqi ruler. Acting as Kahndaq's protector again, Adam sees the Crime Syndicate's message "The World is Ours" and gets angered saying "this world belongs to no one!" When Jimmy Olsen activates his Superman signal watch when confronted by Ultraman, Adam answers the call and ends up fighting Ultraman. Ultraman manages to defeat Adam by breaking his jaw and throws him unconscious into the ocean. Black Manta managed to fish Adam out of the ocean when he meets up with Lex Luthor. During the final battle against the Crime Syndicate, Adam and Sinestro move the Moon where the Sun ends up weakening Ultraman. In the aftermath of the battle against the Crime Syndicate, it was stated that the villains who helped to stop the Crime Syndicate would have their criminal records wiped. Adam and Sinestro did not care about that and went their separate ways, along with the other villains.

=== DC Rebirth (2016–2018) ===
In 2016, DC Comics implemented another relaunch of its books called "DC Rebirth", which restored its continuity to a form much as it was prior to "The New 52". Black Adam appears in the Dark Nights: Metal miniseries. He is revealed to be a member of the Council of the Immortals, a group with the oldest beings of Earth, such as Vandal Savage and Hawkgirl. Adam supposedly kills Doctor Fate at the Rock of Eternity while in a fight against him, Wonder Woman, and Hawkgirl, who is by that point transformed by Barbatos into an evil version of herself named Lady Blackhawk.

When Billy and his family stumble upon the doors to the various Magiclands and go to the Funland, Black Adam arrives at the Rock of Eternity some time after their departure, noting that the Council of Eternity sealed off the Magiclands for a reason, that the door to the Monsterland is still sealed for now, and that Billy has no idea what he has done.

=== Infinite Frontier (2021–2023) ===
In Infinite Frontier, Black Adam joins the Justice League and attempts to turn over a new leaf, harkening back to the lessons Adrianna had taught him. He began acting more as a protector than an avenger, which attracted the attention of Superman, who believed that the Justice League needed fresh perspectives.

On the anniversary of Adrianna's death, Adam visits her grave, reflecting on what she had tried to impart on him. While doing so, he is attacked by Brutus, an invader from another world. After the conflict with Brutus concludes, Adam joins the League.

Later on in Knight Terrors: Black Adam, Black Adam defends Kahndaq's borders from a foreign attack while a deadly insomnia plague sweeps across the planet, plunging everyone into a sleep state within the nightmare realm to witness their worst horrors, including Black Adam himself. During his journey, Teth-Adam witnesses the death of his second family,Adrianna and Amon, all over again. Later in the nightmare, he witnesses the death of his first family—Shiruta, Gon, and Hurut—which drives him mad as he tries to conquer his nightmare. When he finally awakens, he witnesses the flying flag of Kahndaq amidst the debris of his destroyed nation.

== Characterization ==
Throughout the character's publication history, Black Adam is noted to be one who believes himself a leader of humanity and willing to wager any necessary action for the greater good, making him a figure that has served as both a hero and villain. An anti‑hero, the character is portrayed as a brutal and obsessive protector who is fiercely patriotic, isolationist, and guided by his own code of honor, while also being proud and headstrong. A powerful demigod, he is considered one of the most formidable magical wielders and dangerous men on Earth, classified as a "Alpha-level" metahuman.

== Powers and abilities ==
On his own, Black Adam is a skilled martial artist whose mastery included Dhritishastra, a fictional Indian fighting style created by Vandal Savage mastered only by immortals due to its complexity. In addition, his intimidator made him an ideal candidate for induction into the Sinestro Corps for a time.

Similarly to his successor, Billy Batson, Adam can change between his human form and a demigod-like form by saying the magic word ("Shazam!"). In his empowered form, he possess various superhuman attributes derived from aspects of several Ancient Egyptian deities (or the same combination as Billy early into the New 52) and magical powers, including the Living Lightning, granting him the power to bestow a portion of his power to others. His advanced capability allowed him to once share his power between countless numerous heroes during a time of crisis. Other abilities includes the instant learning of languages via absorption tracking the location of others using blood magic. His magical powers derived from deities includes:

S	Stamina of Shu	The equivalent to the "Stamina of Atlas", the stamina attribute from Shu enables Adam to maintain his empowered state for an extended period without any time limitations. Additionally, the empowerment provides Adam with sustenance, eliminating the need for eating, sleeping, and even breathing. As a result, Adam can operate at peak efficiency, unaffected by the physiological requirements that typically apply to ordinary individuals.
H	Speed of Horus	The equivalent to the "Speed of Mercury", the Speed of Horus grants Black Adam super speed, enhanced reflexes, motor skills, and flight, enabling them to move at incredible speeds, react swiftly, perform precise maneuvers, and soar through the air. Thus far, Black Adam has demonstrated the ability to run at speeds reaching Mach 500.
A	Strength of Amon	The equivalent of the "Strength of Hercules", this bestows Adam an exceptional level of superhuman strength. He gains the ability to exert immense physical power, surpassing the capabilities of ordinary individuals. With this heightened strength, they can effortlessly lift and manipulate objects of tremendous weight, overpower adversaries with ease, and deliver devastating blows in combat. Black Adam's strength is often depicted as being comparable to that of Superman and Captain Marvel, with some interpretations suggesting he may even surpass them. In a notable instance, he faced off against a formidable coalition consisting of the Justice League (excluding Superman and Wonder Woman), the Justice Society of America, the Great Ten, the Martian Manhunter, and the Teen Titans, holding his own against this collective force.
Z	Wisdom of Zehuti	Similar to the "Wisdom of Solomon", the Wisdom of Zehuti grants Adam slightly different powers from the wisdom derived from Solomon. The wisdom enhanced Adam's mind, granting him near eidetic memory, a greater understanding of mathematics, combat strategy, languages, sciences, and he can also sense mystical forces.
A	Power of Aten	The equivalent to the "Power of Zeus", this attribute facilitates the transformation that grants Adam access to the full range of his powers, including the ability to shoot bursts of electricity and lightning. He also possesses a limited gift of teleportation, allowing him to effortlessly travel to and from the Rock of Eternity with a single thought. Notably, the Power of Aten empowers him with the potential to use magic and cast spells. This power is considered the most difficult, requiring the most study, focus and discipline.
M	Courage of Mehen	The equivalent to the "Courage of Achilles", the Courage of Mehen grants Black Adam peak physical defenses, rendering him nearly invulnerable. This heightened level of invulnerability provides significant protection against physical harm. Additionally, the empowerment grants Adam resistance to various elements, including heat, force, disease, and the effects of aging. This attribute allow Adam to withstand extreme conditions and maintain his health and vitality against formidable challenges.

== Other versions ==
Malik-Adam as Bolt. Art by Jose Luis, Rafa Sandoval, Jordi Tarragona, Joonas Trindade.

- Malik Adam White (Malik-Adam for short) is an African-American medical student and one of Black Adam's descendants who he chooses as both his second protege and successor as Champion in an effort to redeem his efforts for his more villainous actions after believing to contract a deadly sickness. Granting him his powers and codename White Adam, Malik instead settles for Bolt and becomes a reluctant superhero and ally of the Shazam Family.
- Theo Adam is a corrupted colleague, archaeologist aide, and a descendant of Black Adam alongside his sister Sarah Primm. Murdering the Batsons, he steals a magical scarab containing the spirit of Black Adam, who then steals his body for his own in order to exist in the modern era. Later revisions omit and consoldiate with the character, with Black Adam instead preserved from magic and escaping his exile and has the name "Theo" serve as his birth name.

=== Alternate universes ===
- Black Adam appears in JLA/Avengers as a mind-controlled minion of Krona.
- A young, alternate universe version of Black Adam appears in Billy Batson and the Magic of Shazam!.
- An alternate universe version of Black Adam appears in Flashpoint.
- Black Adam appears in Absolute Superman #18 by Jason Aaron and Rafa Sandoval. Unlike the traditional adult anti-hero, Teth-Adam is a tormented child from ancient Egypt who gains power through experimentation by the Brainiac Collective, becoming a brutal force against the Absolute Universe's heroes.

=== Alternate futures ===
- An alternate timeline version of Black Adam appears in The New 52: Futures End. This version is an inmate of the Phantom Zone who later joins Stormwatch.
- An alternate future version of Black Adam appears in Future State. Long surviving into the 853rd century (the setting of DC One Million crossover) as a powerless, reformed ruler of Planet Kahndaq, he has a secret relationship with the futuristic analogue of Wonder Woman. He is forced to reclaim his power once more shortly after reuniting with the Wizard Shazam and Wonder Woman's revelation of being pregnant to battle the Unkindness (an evil version of Raven who stole Billy Batson's powers), supported by the Lords of Chaos and Seven Deadly Enemies of Man. Sacrificing himself, the Wizard sends him to "Prime Earth" to avert Raven's ascension as Unkindness although his death causes complications for his present self due to existing simultaneously as a god, disrupting magic for the present Shazam Family, causing the future Black Adam to revert to a teenaged form when transformed, and displacing the Rock of Eternity into Hell. Calling himself Black Adam Jr., he helps Billy restore his powers and address the Rock of Eternity's displacement, averting the alternate future which he originated from.

== In other media ==
=== Television ===
Black Adam as he appears in the Shazam! animated series.

- Black Adam appears in the "Shazam!" segment of The Kid Super Power Hour with Shazam!, voiced by Lou Scheimer. This version is based on the pre-Crisis comics incarnation and wields several mystical artifacts.
- Black Adam appears in the Batman: The Brave and the Bold episode "The Power of Shazam!", voiced by John DiMaggio.
- Black Adam makes a non-speaking appearance in the Young Justice episode "Revelation" as a member of the Injustice League.
- Black Adam appears in Robot Chicken DC Comics Special 2: Villains in Paradise, voiced by Nathan Fillion. This version is a member of the Legion of Doom.
- Black Adam appears in Justice League Action, voiced by Gary Cole.
- Black Adam makes non-speaking cameo appearances in Harley Quinn as a member of the Legion of Doom.
  - Black Adam makes a non-speaking appearance in the Kite Man: Hell Yeah! episode "Sexiest Villain Alive, Hell Yeah!".

=== Film ===
- Black Adam appears in Superman/Shazam!: The Return of Black Adam, voiced by Arnold Vosloo. This version has a backstory similar to his original Fawcett incarnation, having been banished from Earth after misusing the powers granted to him by the wizard Shazam. He returns to Earth after 5,000 years and wreaks havoc before being defeated by Captain Marvel and Superman. To avoid being banished again, Adam reverts to his mortal form and turns to dust.
- Black Adam appears in Lego DC Shazam! Magic and Monsters, voiced by Imari Williams.
- Teth-Adam / Black Adam appears in films set in the DC Extended Universe (DCEU), portrayed by Dwayne Johnson.
  - A mystical projection of Black Adam, with Johnson's likeness, appears in Shazam!. This version unleashed the Seven Deadly Sins on Earth and erased entire civilizations before being captured and imprisoned for 5,000 years. Black Adam was originally set to appear physically before it was decided he would receive his own film to avoid interfering with Shazam!'s narrative.
  - Black Adam appears in a self-titled film, in which it is revealed that his son Hurut (portrayed by Jalon Christian and Uli Latukefu as his empowered form) was Kahndaq's original champion chosen by the Council of Wizards before he bequeathed his powers to his mortally wounded father to save him and was killed shortly after. Adam is later freed in the present and eventually becomes Kahndaq's new protector.
- Black Adam appears in the post-credits scene of DC League of Super-Pets, voiced by Dwayne Johnson. This version owns a dog named Anubis (also voiced by Johnson).

=== Video games ===
- Black Adam appears in DC Universe Online, voiced by Alexander Brandon. This version is a member of the Secret Society.
- Black Adam appears as a playable character in Injustice: Gods Among Us, voiced by Joey Naber. Additionally, an alternate universe version of Adam appears in the story mode as an ally of High Councilor Superman's Regime.
- Black Adam appears as a character summon in Scribblenauts Unmasked: A DC Comics Adventure.
- Black Adam appears as a playable character in DC Unchained.
- Black Adam appears as a playable character in Injustice 2, voiced again by Joey Naber.
- Black Adam, based on the DCEU incarnation, appears as an outfit in Fortnite Battle Royale.
- Black Adam appears as a playable character in MultiVersus, voiced by Bob Carter. Additionally, Imari Williams voices a "Man in Black" variant.

==== Lego series ====
- Black Adam appears as an unlockable playable character and mini-boss in Lego Batman 2: DC Super Heroes, voiced by Fred Tatasciore.
- Black Adam appears as a playable character in Lego Batman 3: Beyond Gotham, voiced again by Fred Tatasciore.
- Black Adam appears in Lego DC Super-Villains, voiced again by Fred Tatasciore. This version is a member of the Legion of Doom.

=== Miscellaneous ===
- Black Adam appears in GraphicAudio's audiobook adaptations of Infinite Crisis and 52.
- The Injustice incarnation of Black Adam appears in the Injustice: Gods Among Us and Injustice 2 prequel comics. In the latter, he provides asylum for members of the Regime in Kahndaq, frees Wonder Woman from her prison on Themyscira, and raises Supergirl on lies about Batman's Insurgency with Wonder Woman and Damian Wayne's help.
- Khem-Adam appears in the non-canonical Arrowverse tie-in comic Arrow: Season 2.5. This version is a former soldier and leader of the extremist group Onslaught who wants to save Kahndaq from foreign influence. A.R.G.U.S. sends the Suicide Squad to kill him, but Khem-Adam kills Bronze Tiger. The former attempts to fight General Ravan Nassar, but the fight is interrupted by League of Assassins members Nyssa Al Ghul and Sara Lance, who take him to Nanda Parbat to be executed by ex-Onslaught prisoner turned League member Mesi Natifah.
- Black Adam appears in the Death Battle episode "Black Adam VS Apocalypse".

=== Merchandise ===
- DC Direct released two action figures of White Adam, with the most recent one based on the work of artist Alex Ross.
- Black Adam appears in a set of View-Master reels starring Captain Marvel.
- In 2009, Black Adam received a figure in wave nine of DC Universe Classics series.
- In 2011, Black Adam received a figure in the "Mightiest Mortals" two-pack alongside Shazam.
- In 2016, Black Adam received a figure in wave two of DC Collectible's DC Icons series.
- In 2016, a mini-figure of Black Adam mixed with Thomas & Friends character Edward was released in wave four of the franchise's MINIS line.
- Mezco's One:12 Collective released a PX Exclusive 6-inch Black Adam in a collector's tin.
