= List of DC Comics characters: W =

== Warhawk ==
Warhawk (Rex Stewart) is a character created for the DC Animated Universe, voiced by Peter Onorati. In the Batman Beyond episode "The Call", Warhawk is introduced as a member of Justice League Unlimited (the Justice League of the future) alongside Big Barda, Green Lantern (Kai-Ro), and Aquagirl (Mareena). He is initially at odds with Batman (Terry McGinnis) because Superman had recruited him into the team without the rest of the League's consent. After Batman proves himself to be a competent and trustworthy member against Starro, Warhawk's attitude shifts from reluctant ally to devoted teammate.

Warhawk appears in the Justice League Unlimited episode "The Once and Future Thing, Part Two: Time Warped", where he is revealed to be the son of Green Lantern (John Stewart) and Shayera Hol. In the third-season episode "Ancient History", Stewart informs Hol of Warhawk's existence. Despite still loving Hol, Stewart decides to stay with Vixen, refusing to let his knowledge of the future affect the present.

=== Other versions ===
- An alternate universe version of Hawk inspired by Warhawk appears in Justice League of America (vol. 2) #25.
- A group called the Warhawks appear in The New 52 as Thanagar's military force.

== Warlock's Daughter ==
Warlock's Daughter is a character appearing in American comic books published by DC Comics. Created by Bill Willingham and Rick Mays, the Warlock's Daughter first appeared in Robin (vol. 2) #121 (February 2004).

Darla Aquista, the daughter of Gotham City mobster Henry Aquista, shares a connection with Tim Drake, the third Robin, and develops feelings for him. However, their potential relationship is hindered by her father's criminal involvement. Darla meets her demise in a conflict but is resurrected by Johnny Warlock, who taps into her father's life force as part of his search for magical solutions. Renamed as "Warlock's Daughter", Darla becomes a supervillain with the mission of eliminating Robin while harboring affection for Tim Drake, unaware of his secret identity. Over time, Darla reforms as a superhero, joining Shadowpact, becoming the apprentice of the Enchantress, and adopting the alias Laura Fell.

== Wavelength ==
Wavelength is a comic book supervillain appearing in DC Comics. The character, created by Paul Kupperberg and Chris Wozniak, first appeared in Gunfire #9 (February 1995).

Eduardo Reyes was a mercenary and assassin with light manipulation powers, and the father of Allegra Garcia. Wavelength came into conflict with Gunfire. He hired Deathstroke in order to reunite with Allegra who killed him.

== Van Wayne ==
- First appearance: Batman #148 (June 1962)
- Created by: Bill Finger and Sheldon Moldoff
- Further reading: Wayne Van Wayne at the Comic Book DB (archived from Wayne the original); Wayne&type=character Van Wayne at the Grand Comics Database

Vanderveer "Van" Wayne is a character appearing in American comic books published by DC Comics.

Vanderveer Wayne is Bruce Wayne's rich and spoiled cousin who is an expert at fencing and gymnastics. While visiting Bruce, Van found the Robin costume in Alfred's laundry which Bruce claimed were his and Dick Grayson's masquerade costumes. He got himself into some trouble when he hired a con artist named Jumpy Regan to impersonate Batman, while he posed as Robin. He did all this with the intention of impressing Dick, but Van was not aware that they were the real Dynamic Duo. Van had to be rescued from Regan by Batman and Robin and even helped to apprehend Regan. In the aftermath of the situation, he learned a lesson in humility.

=== Van Wayne in other media ===
Van Wayne appears in Powerless, portrayed by Alan Tudyk. This version is the head of Wayne Security, a subsidiary of Wayne Enterprises in Charm City who hates his job and seeks to move to Gotham City for a better position at the company. Additionally, Wayne is the son of Vanderveer Wayne Sr., a member of Wayne Security's board of directors.

== Winema Wazzo ==
Winema Wazzo is the mother of Legionnaire Phantom Girl (Tinya Wazzo). She was created by writers Tom and Mary Bierbaum, and first appeared in Secret Origins vol. 2 #42 (July 1989). In post-Zero Hour continuity, Winema is the daughter of Bgztl diplomats and becomes president of the United Planets after Ra's al Ghul kills President Leland McCauley.

Originally, Winema was married to Bgztl native Byzjn Wazzo. Post-Zero Hour, her husband is Murl Wazzo, a Carggite, with that continuity's version of Tinya being a hybrid.

=== Winema Wazzo in other media ===
Winema Wazzo appears in Legion of Super Heroes, voiced by April Winchell.

== Weasel ==
Weasel is the name of two DC Comics supervillains. Weasel first appeared in The Fury of Firestorm #35 (August 1985), and was created by Gerry Conway and Rafael Kayanan.

=== John Monroe ===
Weasel

Publication information
- Publisher: DC Comics
- First appearance: The Fury of Firestorm #35 (June 1985)
- Created by: Gerry Conway (writer); Rafael Kayanan (artist)

In-story information
- Alter ego: John Monroe
- Team affiliations: Suicide Squad; Black Lantern Corps
- Abilities: Enhanced agility Skilled in hand-to-hand combat

John Monroe was a lonely student at Stanford University in the late 1960s. His contemporaries rarely noticed him. If they did, they referred to him in derogatory terms, using words like "Weasel" to describe him. This made him bitter, driving him to become a murderer decades later. The grown John Monroe became a teacher at Vandemeer University in Pittsburgh, Pennsylvania. A number of his fellow students from Stanford University held prominent positions. To rationalize killing three of them, he considered them threats to getting tenure at Vandemeer. Taking on the costumed identity of Weasel, displaying great agility, expertise at hand-to-hand combat, and a costume with sharp claws, Monroe stalks the campus grounds and murders Arnold Lintel, Linda Walters, and night guard Chuck Gherkin. When Martin Stein (one half of Firestorm) shows up for a job opening as a physics professor, Monroe makes two attempts on Stein's life. After a fight, Firestorm unmasks Weasel and sends him to jail.

Weasel is recruited into the Suicide Squad for their ill-fated mission to rescue Hawk. During the mission, he tries to kill the Thinker, only to be killed by Rick Flag.

Weasel is resurrected as a Black Lantern in Blackest Night. He returns following The New 52 reboot, where he is depicted as resembling a weasel.

=== Future version ===
An unidentified, futuristic incarnation of Weasel appears in Batman #666 (July 2007) as an enemy of Damian Wayne.

=== Weasel in other media ===
- The John Monroe incarnation of Weasel makes a non-speaking appearance in the Harley Quinn episode "Icons Only". This version is a Las Vegas performer.
- Weasel appears in The Suicide Squad, portrayed by Sean Gunn. This version is a humanoid weasel, inmate of Belle Reve Penitentiary's Non-Human Internment Division, and alleged child murderer. He is recruited into the titular team for a mission to Corto Maltese, but seemingly drowns while being airdropped onto the island's coast and is brought ashore by squad-mate Savant. In a mid-credits scene, Weasel is revealed to have survived and flees into the jungle.
  - Weasel appears in Creature Commandos, with Sean Gunn reprising the role. As of this appearance, he was returned to Belle Reve before being recruited into the eponymous team.

== Weather Witch ==
The Weather Witch is the name of several characters in American comic books published by DC Comics.

=== Vicki Grant ===
Vicki Grant once used the H-Dial to become a weather-controlling superhero called Weather Witch.

=== New Rogues version ===
First appearing in "Gotham Underground", she was originally a prostitute from Gotham City who the Penguin equipped with one of Weather Wizard's Weather Wands and recruited into the New Rogues.

In the Final Crisis tie-in Rogues' Revenge, Libra tasks the New Rogues with forcing the original Rogues to rejoin the Secret Society of Super Villains. Due in part to Weather Witch's inexperience with her Weather Wand, the Rogues defeat and kill the New Rogues, with Weather Wizard killing Weather Witch.

=== Weather Witch in other media ===
An original incarnation of Weather Witch named Joslyn "Joss" Jackam appears in media set in the Arrowverse, portrayed by Reina Hardesty.

- First appearing in the fifth season of The Flash, this version is the estranged daughter of Mark Mardon / Weather Wizard, a member of the Young Rogues, and a former meteorologist who was fired for conducting dangerous weather-based experiments. After a fragment of the Thinker's Enlightenment satellite strikes part of her van, she converts it into a staff that enables her to control the weather like her father and teleport via lightning.
- The Weather Witch makes a cameo appearance in the crossover "Crisis on Infinite Earths".

== Wedna ==
Wedna (also known as Wedna Kil-Gor) was a native of the planet Krypton and the daughter of inventor Kil-Gor. She first appeared in Krypton Chronicles #3 (September 1981).

Wedna married her father's colleague and friend Bur-El and gave a birth to his children Val-El and Tro-El, both who later became a noted explorers. Wedna is an ancestor of Kal-El, also known as Superman, and died several centuries before the destruction of Krypton.

=== Wedna in other media ===
Wedna, renamed Wedna-El, appears in a flashback in the Krypton episode "Zods and Monsters", portrayed by Toni O'Rourke. This version is a scientist who helped create Doomsday.

== Weeper ==
The Weeper is the name of two comic book supervillains appearing in media published by Fawcett Comics and DC Comics, both of whom are enemies of Bulletman and Bulletgirl.

=== Mortimer Gloom ===
The Weeper, the Murder Prophet, and the Black Rat form the Revenge Syndicate. From Bulletman #7 (September 16, 1942).

Mortimer Gloom, formerly known as the "Crying Clown" or "Weeping Willie", is fired for dishonesty from his work as a circus performer. Sometime afterward, he commits several acts of revenge. He then takes on the name "the Weeper". The Weeper sends letters and visits a number of families telling them tragic news. Later, the families discover that the Weeper has lied to them. The Weeper tells these lies so he could either case the families' homes for robbery or they would lead him to where they hid their valuable possessions. The Weeper puts an ad in the paper looking for men who feel life has given them a raw deal. He interviews them all and picks ten of the saddest men. He calls them the Bittermen. The Weeper, along with the Bittermen, commits a series of ghastly acts which attracts the attention of Bulletman and Bulletgirl. He succeeds in capturing Bulletgirl. However, Bulletman is able to save her and the Weeper is apparently drowned. The Weeper survives and becomes a founding member of the Revenge Syndicate alongside Murder Prophet and Black Rat.

=== Second Weeper ===
The second Weeper (right) and Dr. Riddle threaten Susan Kent (a.k.a. Bulletgirl). From Mary Marvel #8 (December 1946).

At some point between 1942 and 1946, the Weeper dies and is replaced by his son, the second Weeper. In 1946, Bulletgirl and her friend Mary Marvel fight the Weeper and Dr. Riddle. They first try to hang Bulletgirl in her civilian identity of Susan Kent after surprising her and pulling her up with a noose and the Weeper tries to stab her also, but Mary stops them, as she was with Susan when the villains attacked. The villains escape while Mary frees Susan from the noose and she changes to Bulletgirl; however, a riddle left behind allows the two to track the villains to an abandoned asylum. The villains capture Mary, who is freed by Bulletgirl. Dr. Riddle escapes as Mary saves a plane the villains had captured, but Mary Marvel captures him and Bulletgirl gets the Weeper. They are then jailed.

The Weeper teams up with Joker of Earth-Two, Doctor Light of Earth-One, and Shade of Earth-One during King Kull's plan to wipe out humanity on three Earths. Members of Earth-One's Justice League and Earth-Two's Justice Society of America travel to Earth-S and meet the Squadron of Justice—Bulletman and Bulletgirl, Mr. Scarlet and Pinky the Whiz Kid, Ibis the Invincible, and Spy Smasher. The Joker teaches the Weeper his style of committing crimes on Earth-S, stealing jewels and transforming people into different materials, with his trademark grin, although the Weeper cannot understand why the Joker laughs about crime. They are stopped by the Earth-Two Batman, the Earth-Two Robin, Mister Scarlet, and Pinky.

=== Weeper in other media ===
- The Mortimer Gloom incarnation of the Weeper appears in the Batman: The Brave and the Bold episode "Joker: The Vile and the Villainous!", voiced by Tim Conway. This version wields a cane capable of producing miniature rain clouds that make people give in to misery as well as handkerchiefs that can grow and entrap his opponents. Additionally, he is the first supervillain to use a signature motif in his crimes and inspired the Joker as a supervillain.
- An original, unnamed incarnation of the Weeper appears in The Flash, portrayed by Matt Afonso. This version is a metahuman who produces "love drug" tears and given his powers by the Thinker to control his wife Marlize DeVoe.
- The Mortimer Gloom incarnation of the Weeper appears in Scooby-Doo! & Batman: The Brave and the Bold.

== Mary West ==
Mary West is a character appearing in American comic books published by DC Comics. She was created by John Broome and Carmine Infantino, first appearing in The Flash #133 (December 1962).

Mary West is the mother of Wally West.

=== Mary West in other media ===
Mary West appears in Young Justice, voiced by Cree Summer.

== Rudy West ==
Rudy West is a character appearing in American comic books published by DC Comics. He was created by John Broome and Carmine Infantino, first appearing in The Flash #116 (November 1960).

Rudy West is the father of Wally West. During the "Millennium" storyline, Rudy is revealed to have been an agent of the Manhunters. In the "Invasion!" storyline, Rudy is apparently killed after detonating a bomb to destroy a Durlan base. He is later revealed to have survived and is no longer affiliated with the Manhunters.

=== Rudy West in other media ===
Rudy West appears in Young Justice, voiced by Steve Blum.

== Thomas Weston ==
Thomas Weston is the head of AmerTek Industries who uses his company to sell dangerous weapons. John Henry Irons used to work for him.

=== Thomas Weston in other media ===
- Thomas Weston appears in Steel (1997), portrayed by an uncredited Michael Preston. This version is an arms dealer.
- Thomas Weston appears in the Arrow episode "Sara", portrayed by Gerald Paetz. This version is a board member of AmerTek Industries.
- Thomas Weston appears in the My Adventures with Superman episode "Fullmetal Scientist", voiced by Max Mittelman. This version is initially the CEO of AmerTek Industries until his corrupt business practices are exposed and his company is bought out by Lex Luthor.

== Whale ==
- First appearance: Showcase #3 (July–August 1956)
- Created by: Robert Kanigher (script); Russ Heath (art)

Whale is a character in DC Comics publications.

Whale is a non-superpowered commando. Along with his companions Shark and Sardine, he is part of the World War II-era fighting unit called the Frogmen. His sole appearance is in Showcase #3 (July–August 1956). The story was written by Robert Kanigher, and illustrated by Russ Heath.

== White Canary ==
White Canary

Publication information
- Publisher: DC Comics
- First appearance: Birds of Prey #1 (July 2010)
- Created by: Gail Simone; Ed Benes

In-story information
- Abilities: Expert martial artist and weapons master.

During the Birds of Prey relaunch tie-in with the 2010 Brightest Day storyline, it is revealed that one of the female children born to Huang Chao Ran of the Twelve Brothers in Silk was spared after lightning appeared on the day of her birth and killed her midwife, making Huang believe that something powerful wanted her to live. She was trained by her brothers in the same techniques, and after their defeat at the hands of Black Canary, she hunted them down and killed them for dishonoring their father's name. Now calling herself the White Canary, she traveled to Gotham and set out to blackmail Black Canary by revealing her secret identity and threatening to kill one teammate for each hour that passed, enlisting the help of Oswald Cobblepot, Savant, and Creote. Upon being defeated by Black Canary, she denied being responsible for the death of a kidnapper in Iceland to frame Black Canary, claiming that it was in fact Lady Shiva, and offers Black Canary help in killing Shiva if she is set free.

Later, White Canary takes Black Canary to Bangkok and reveals that she is holding Black Canary's adopted daughter Sin as a hostage, and will kill her if Black Canary does not battle Lady Shiva in a duel to the death. Black Canary agrees despite her broken wrist, but at the last minute Helena Bertinelli challenges Shiva in her place, buying Black Canary enough time to find Sin and get her to safety, and Shiva agrees to put their duel off until a later time. White Canary reluctantly concedes, but promises that Black Canary has not seen the last of her.

=== Alternate versions of White Canary ===
- The White Canary appears in the Ame-Comi Girls comic book series. This version is a superheroine instead of a supervillain and possesses the "Canary Cry".
- The White Canary appears in The New 52's Black Canary title. This version is Izak Orato, who disguised herself as Black Canary's aunt to trick her.

=== White Canary in other media ===
- An original incarnation of White Canary, Sara Lance, appears in media set in the Arrowverse, portrayed by Caity Lotz.
- The Sara Lance incarnation of White Canary appears as a "premier skin" for Black Canary in the mobile version of Injustice 2.

== White Dragon ==
White Dragon is the name of several characters appearing in DC Comics.

=== Walter Morgan ===
Walter Morgan is the first White Dragon, a gang leader and enemy of Whip on Earth-Two.

=== Wu Cheng ===
Wu Cheng, also known as Chop-Chop or Liu Huang, is the second White Dragon, a World War II pilot on Earth-One. Wu Cheng fought against Japanese forces in China using the masked persona of the White Dragon. After being captured and believing he "lost face," he abandoned the identity and formally joined the Blackhawk Squadron.

=== Daniel Ducannon ===
Daniel Ducannon is the third White Dragon. He is a Neo-Nazi who is a pyrokinetic metahuman because of the Dominators' gene bomb detonation, utilizing the MetaTech Corporation's resources in order to appear as a vigilante who is an enemy of Hawkgirl, Hawkman and Hawkwoman. Additionally, Ducannon is a member of the Fourth Reich with a massive, living white dragon.

=== William Heller ===
William "Billy" Heller is the fourth White Dragon. He conspires with Wade Eiling to overthrow Amanda Waller's Suicide Squad.

=== White Dragon in other media ===
- The David Ducannon incarnation of White Dragon appears as a character summon in Scribblenauts Unmasked: A DC Comics Adventure.
- An original incarnation of White Dragon, August Smith, appears in Peacemaker, portrayed by Robert Patrick.

== White Rabbit ==
White Rabbit is the name of three characters appearing in comic books published by DC Comics.

=== Angora Lapin ===
Dr. Angora Lapin is a mysterious arms dealer who operates in Metropolis as White Rabbit. She and her henchmen C&H, Dutch, and Mucus stole high-tech weaponry made by John Henry Irons called "Toastmasters" so that they can sell them to the gangs of Metropolis. When John Henry Irons first became "Man of Steel", his primary goal was to get the Toastmasters off the streets and defeat White Rabbit.

Lapin is an albino woman with a brilliant mind and a streak of ruthlessness. She had initially been romantically involved with Irons, using their relationship to procure copies of his advanced weapons which she then sold to criminals while Superman was gone from Metropolis following his apparent death.

=== Second version ===
The second White Rabbit is an unnamed swordsman and mercenary who is a member of the Pentacle and enemy of Shadowpact.

=== Jaina Hudson ===
"The New 52" shows Jaina Hudson, the child of a Bollywood actress and diplomat Tom Hudson. After spending time in private schools, Jaina attended a fundraiser where she met Bruce Wayne. When first seen as White Rabbit, she was among the Arkham Asylum inmates who escaped. When Batman caught up to White Rabbit near the scene of dead clowns, the Joker draped a cloth over her. Batman fought Joker until it was discovered that Joker is Clayface in disguise. White Rabbit tried to inject a steroid into Batman, only to be thwarted by the Flash.

In Forever Evil, White Rabbit joins the Crime Syndicate of America's incarnation of the Secret Society of Super Villains.

In the "DC Rebirth" relaunch, White Rabbit appears as a member of the Wonderland Gang.

=== Powers and abilities of White Rabbit ===
The Jaina Hudson incarnation of White Rabbit is able to split herself into two beings: a second version of herself and White Rabbit. White Rabbit resembles Hudson, but possesses a separate personality and white hair.

=== White Rabbit in other media ===
- The Jaina Hudson incarnation of White Rabbit appears as a character summon in Scribblenauts Unmasked: A DC Comics Adventure.
- The Jaina Hudson incarnation of White Rabbit makes a cameo appearance in the Peacemaker episode "The Ties That Grind", portrayed by Brey Noelle. This version is a failed applicant to the Justice Gang.

== Wildstar ==
Wildstar was a native of the planet Starhaven, born with an innate tracking ability and deformed wings, leading her to grow up as a pariah to her own people. She was recruited by Vril Dox to the R.E.B.E.L.S. team as her tribe wanted to get rid of her, and she was promised to be given the power of flight, as Dox saw the potential of her tracking power. However, Dox turned her into an anti-energy being, placed in a containment suit.

== Will Power ==
Will Power is a character appearing in American comic books published by DC Comics.

William Twotrees is the illegitimate son of 1940s hero Johnny Thunder and a Jicarilla Apache woman. Afraid of prejudices against mixed marriages, Johnny abandoned his son, something he later regretted deeply. However, it seems as if Johnny's partner, the magic Thunderbolt named Yz, left his mark on young William, who developed astonishing Thunderbolt powers of his own later in his life. As Will Power, William joined the supernatural/metahuman team of heroes called the Leymen (a.k.a. Primal Force) until it was disbanded. He was last seen searching for his father, touring with a rock band as a "human light show".

== Arak Wind-Walker ==
Arak Wind-Walker is among the children who were experimented on by Doctor Love while they were still in their mother's womb, causing him to develop the ability to manipulate wind. Love raised the six in isolation until they learned of their origins, upon which they killed Love and struck out on their own as the group Helix. In addition, Arak is a descendant of the hero Arak.

== Windfall ==
Windfall is the name of several characters appearing in American comic books published by DC Comics. The first Windfall was Wendy Jones who debuted in Batman and the Outsiders #9 (April 1984) and was created by writer Mike W. Barr and artist Jim Aparo.

=== Wendy Jones ===
Wendy Jones was a young metahuman who gained her aerokinetic powers after her mother let her company perform prenatal DNA experiments on her and her sister Becky, causing Becky to eventually kill their mother in revenge later in life.

Originally a member of the Masters of Disaster and an enemy of the Outsiders, Windfall eventually joined the latter group.

At one point during college, Wendy was invited to a fraternity party and date-raped by members of the fraternity after they spiked her drink with flunitrazepam. After taking turns with Wendy, the fraternity members took pictures and posted them on the Internet, while the local district attorney, the father of one of the fraternity members who ruined her, refused to make a case for Wendy due to her past as a supervillainess. As a result of the scandal, the college Wendy attended expelled her to avoid scrutiny, causing Wendy to return to the college and kill the fraternity members who ruined her via suffocation. Wendy was later incarcerated in Belle Reve for her murders before being recruited by Amanda Waller for the Suicide Squad.

During a mission to the Middle East, General Wade Eiling betrays the Suicide Squad and leads a mutiny against them. Windfall attempts to protect the team from Chemo with an air wall, but is unable to maintain the wall and is killed.

=== Second version ===
In the "DC All In" initiative, an unidentified incarnation of Windfall is introduced. This version is an African-American female and a member of Volcana's Masters of Disaster.

=== Windfall in other media ===
- Windfall appears in the DC Nation Shorts: Thunder and Lightning episode "Lightning Under the Weather".
- A character loosely based on Windfall named Wendy Hernandez appears in Black Lightning, portrayed by Madison Bailey. She is a teenage metahuman who acquired her powers after being exposed to the drug "Green Light" 30 years prior before she was captured by the A.S.A. and put into a stasis pod. After being accidentally freed in the present, she escapes and wanders Freeland in a delirious state before Black Lightning subdues her, after which she voluntarily returns to her pod.
- Wendy Jones appears in Young Justice, voiced by Zehra Fazal. This version is an Australian teenager who was previously captured by a metahuman trafficking ring before being rescued by the Team. As of a flashback depicted in the episode "Volatile", she has joined the Outsiders.

== Wing ==
Wing is a character appearing in American comic books published by DC Comics.

Wing began as a uniformed chauffeur of the Crimson Avenger (Lee Travis). A Chinese immigrant who moved to America to escape Japanese persecution in the days leading up to World War II, Wing helps to instill a social conscience in his employer. When the death of a fellow reporter motivates Travis to become the Crimson Avenger, Wing assists him in his fight against crime.

A few months after the Crimson Avenger abandons his cloak and fedora for a more traditional superhero costume, Wing dons a matching yellow costume and becomes his official sidekick. He serves as a member of the Seven Soldiers of Victory (as the honorary "eighth Soldier") and the All-Star Squadron. However, the Crimson Avenger frequently attempts to dissuade Wing from this path, believing that the bright young man has a better future ahead of him than running about in a costume fighting madmen.

In Justice League of America #100, Wing sacrifices himself to defeat Nebula Man, who scattered the other Soldiers through time. While most of the JLA and JSA travelled through time to find the members, Green Lantern, Mister Terrific and Robin went on a quest to discover the identity of the Unknown Soldier of Victory who was buried in Tibet.

In the storyline "The New Golden Age", Wing is displaced in time before his death and brought to Orphan Island alongside many other lost sidekicks. During the ensuing battle with Childminder, Wing learns that his death cannot be prevented and that he must return to his own time. Wing persuades the Lost Children to let him die despite their attempts to save him.

=== Wing in other media ===
Wing makes a cameo appearance in a photograph in the Stargirl episode "Brainwave" as a member of the Seven Soldiers of Victory.

== Wink ==
Wink is a young metahuman terrorist in the DC Universe, who was a member of the Suicide Squad and The Revolutionaries with the power of teleportation. She is dating The Aerie. Created by Tom Taylor and Bruno Redondo, she first appeared in Suicide Squad (vol. 6) #1 (February 2020).

== Marcus Wise ==
Marcus Wise is a character appearing in American comic books published by DC Comics.

Marcus Wise is a corrupt detective of the Gotham City Police Department, usually blackmailing other officers.

=== Marcus Wise in other media ===
Marcus Wise appears in The Penguin, portrayed by Craig Walker. This version is a drug addict who works for Carmine Falcone and later Sofia Falcone.

== Wizard ==
The Wizard is the name of two characters in DC Comics.

=== William Zard ===
Born in 1913, William Zard grew up living a life of crime. As a gun man for various crime bosses, he ultimately ended up in jail. Over time, he formulated a strategy to become a specialized kingpin. To accomplish this task, he moved to Tibet and trained under a proficient lama in the mystic arts of illusion and deception. Upon completion of his training, he proceeded to kill his master. Returning to the United States, he embarked on a career as a criminal magician. Zard later became the leader of the Injustice Society. Later one, Wizard formed an alliance of villains from Earth-Two and Earth-One called the Crime Champions. Wizard was later part of the Secret Society of Super Villains.

=== Wizard in other media ===
- The William Zard incarnation of Wizard appears in Young Justice, voiced by Corey Burton.
- The William Zard incarnation of Wizard, renamed William Zarick, appears in Stargirl, portrayed by Joe Knezevich. This version is a member of the Injustice Society of America (ISA). In his civilian identity, Zarick is an executive and financial supporter of a prominent business called The American Dream and is the father of aspiring magician Joey Zarick and the husband of Denise Zarick. Having grown weary of his obligations to the ISA and wanting a normal life with his family, Zarick rebuffs his former leader Icicle when he comes to seek help against Stargirl. After Joey is killed in an accident that Icicle caused, Zarick confronts Icicle to avenge Joey, but is killed.

== Wolf Spider ==
Wolf Spider (Evan Blake) is a character appearing in American comic books published by DC Comics. He is a rich playboy and old friend of Kate Kane who operates as the art thief Wolf Spider. Wolf Spider ran afoul of Batwoman when he tried stole paintings by a Depression-era artist named Eisenstadt. One of his works was actually a map to the location of the money that Eisenstadt stole from Grantham, a crooked businessman. He was actually hired by Grantham's grandson Nathan Grantham. When the map was obtained, Nathan was wounded when a statue fell on him, causing Batwoman to allow Wolf Spider to abscond with the money and with no knowledge of his identity. Despite his mission being a success, Wolf Spider disposed of the money in Slaughter Swamp as he considered it "blood money".

=== Wolf Spider in other media ===
Wolf Spider appears in Batwoman, portrayed by Lincoln Clauss.

== Gregory Wolfe ==
Gregory Wolfe is a character appearing in American comic books published by DC Comics.

Gregory Wolfe is the prison warden of Iron Heights Penitentiary and an enemy of the Flash (Barry Allen). He can cause muscle spasms, which aids him in keeping inmates in line.

In the DC Rebirth continuity, Wolfe has no powers. After having a nervous breakdown, he is found guilty of mistreating the inmates of Iron Heights and imprisoned at Belle Reve. The Lords of Order choose Wolfe to become their avatar, giving him vast magical abilities and healing his mind. Wolfe is freed from prison, becomes the mayor of Central City, and recruits the Rogues as police officers. However, Wally West realizes that Wolfe is being possessed and speaks with the Lord of Order possessing him, who agrees to relinquish control. Wolfe retains his sanity after being freed and tentatively agrees to work with the Flash.

=== Gregory Wolfe in other media ===
Gregory Wolfe appears in The Flash, portrayed by Anthony Harrison in the first season and Richard Brooks in the fourth season. This version is corrupt, lacks metahuman abilities, and has connections with Amunet Black.

== Wonder Man ==
Wonder Man is the name of three characters in the DC Comics universe.

=== Ajax ===
The first Wonder Man is a superhero who arrived in Metropolis with powers equal to Superman’s and no weakness to Kryptonite. Later, he was revealed to be Ajax, a Superman robot whose mind had been transferred into an android body by the Superman Revenge Squad. Ajax had been programmed to destroy Superman, but he rebelled in order to save Superman’s life, sacrificing himself in the process.

=== Hercules ===
The second is Hercules, who uses the name when he replaces Wonder Woman as the representative of the Olympian Gods.

=== Dane of Elysium ===
The third is Dane of Elysium, who is a male version of Diana Prince from Earth-11, a universe where the genders of the superheroes are reversed.

== World Forger ==
World Forger is a character appearing in American comic books published by DC Comics. Created by writer Scott Snyder and artist Jorge Jimenez, he first appeared in Dark Nights: Metal #4 (February 2018).

The World Forger, also known as Alphaeus, is a cosmic entity, sibling of the Monitor and Anti-Monitor, and son of Perpetua. He creates universes with his hammer and is served by Barbatos, a bat-like demon who destroys failed or decaying universes.

== Lili Worth ==
Lillian "Lili" Worth is a character appearing in American comic books published by DC Comics. The character was created by Marv Wolfman, Art Nichols and Will Blyberg, and first appeared in Deathstroke the Terminator #15 (October 1992). The mother of Rose Wilson and an ex-lover of Deathstroke / Slade Wilson, she is the headmistress of a brothel and a former princess of Cambodia known as Sweet-Lili until she is killed by Wade DeFarge / Ravager.

== Wotan ==
- First appearance: More Fun Comics #55 (May 1940)
- Created by: Gardner Fox; Howard Sherman
- Species: Homo Magi
- Teams: Injustice Society
- Abilities: Extended lifespan via selective reincarnation, mastery of black magic, and advance technology able to counter superpowers.
- Aliases: Wretched Warlock, Wotan the Terrible

Wotan is a supervillain featured in American comic books published by DC Comics. The character, created by Gardner Fox and Howard Sherman, made their first appearance in More Fun Comics #55 in 1940. Wotan is a Viking warlock and a principal adversary of both Doctor Fate and the Injustice Society. Similar to Doctor Fate, Wotan's powers allows him to adopt various incarnations in the past.

Originally having an unrevealed background, Wotan is a Stone Age woman from ancient Scandinavia sexually assaulted by male members of her tribe and became curious about the nature of human suffering. Trained as a witch, she succeeded her mentor and became revered figure. In efforts to discover immortality, she instead controlled her reincarnations and eventually adopted the "Wotan" name for herself and preferred a male identity. By the 20th century, he was a scientific and mystical genius and has feuded with Nabu in prior incarnations. In the 1940s, Wotan battled Green Lantern and Doctor Fate alike, becoming the latter's nemesis, and would aid in plots such as Per Degaton's attempt to capture the JSA and prevent them from undoing their meddling but is foiled by the All-Star Squadron. He once also made an unsuccessful attempt to possess Zatanna, made a failed attempt to kill both the Justice League and Justice Society, and battled Doctor Fate (Linda Strauss) and the Justice League to find God's avatar but is rendered blind and harmless. Wotan would held found a new iteration of the Injustice Society, targeting Khalid Nassour for the Helmet of Fate and other artifacts to bring forth the Unnamed Ones, creatures he and Johnny Sorrow revered, and succeeds for a time. Eventually, Nassour defeats Wotan, Sorrow, and the Unnamed Ones.

=== Alternate versions of Wotan ===
A similar version appears in Earth 2 series; having a similar history, he seeks to usurp Nabu's power and coerced Khalid Ben-Hassin and Jay Garrick under the threat of killing Garrick's mother. Inspired by Garrick's heroism, the archaeologist dons the helm and with his knowledge of Egyptian deities and Nabu's input, he defeats Wotan.

=== Wotan in other media ===
- Wotan appears in Batman: The Brave and the Bold, voiced by James Arnold Taylor.
- Wotan appears in Young Justice, voiced by Bruce Greenwood. This version is a member of the Injustice League.
- Wotan appears as a character summon in Scribblenauts Unmasked: A DC Comics Adventure.

== Carolyn Wu-San ==
- First appearance: Richard Dragon, Kung-Fu Fighter #2 (July 1975)
- Created by: Dennis O'Neil, Jim Berry
- Further reading: Carolyn Wu-San at Comic Vine; Carolyn Wu-San at League of Comic Geeks; Carolyn Wu-San at the Grand Comics Database; Carolyn Wu-San at DC Database

Carolyn Wu-San, also known as Carolyn Woosan and born Wu Mei-Xing, is the goddaughter of O-Sensei and sister of Lady Shiva. She worked alongside Shiva, Richard Dragon and Bronze Tiger, before being murdered by David Cain. She was created by Dennis O'Neil and Jim Berry for the 1974 novel Kung-Fu Master, Richard Dragon: Dragon's Fist, before making her first DC Comics appearance in Richard Dragon, Kung-Fu Fighter #2 (July 1975).

== Wyynde ==
Wyynde was a lieutenant of the Atlantean royal guard in the distant past, and a friend of Arion. Created by Paul Kupperberg and Jan Duursema, he first appeared in Warlord #56 (April 1982).

=== Wyynde in other media ===
A contemporary incarnation of Wyynde appears in Young Justice, voiced by Robbie Daymond. This version is a descendant of the original Wyynde, a former Atlantean purist, and Kaldur'ahm's boyfriend.
