= Ibis the Invincible =

Fawcett Comics superhero

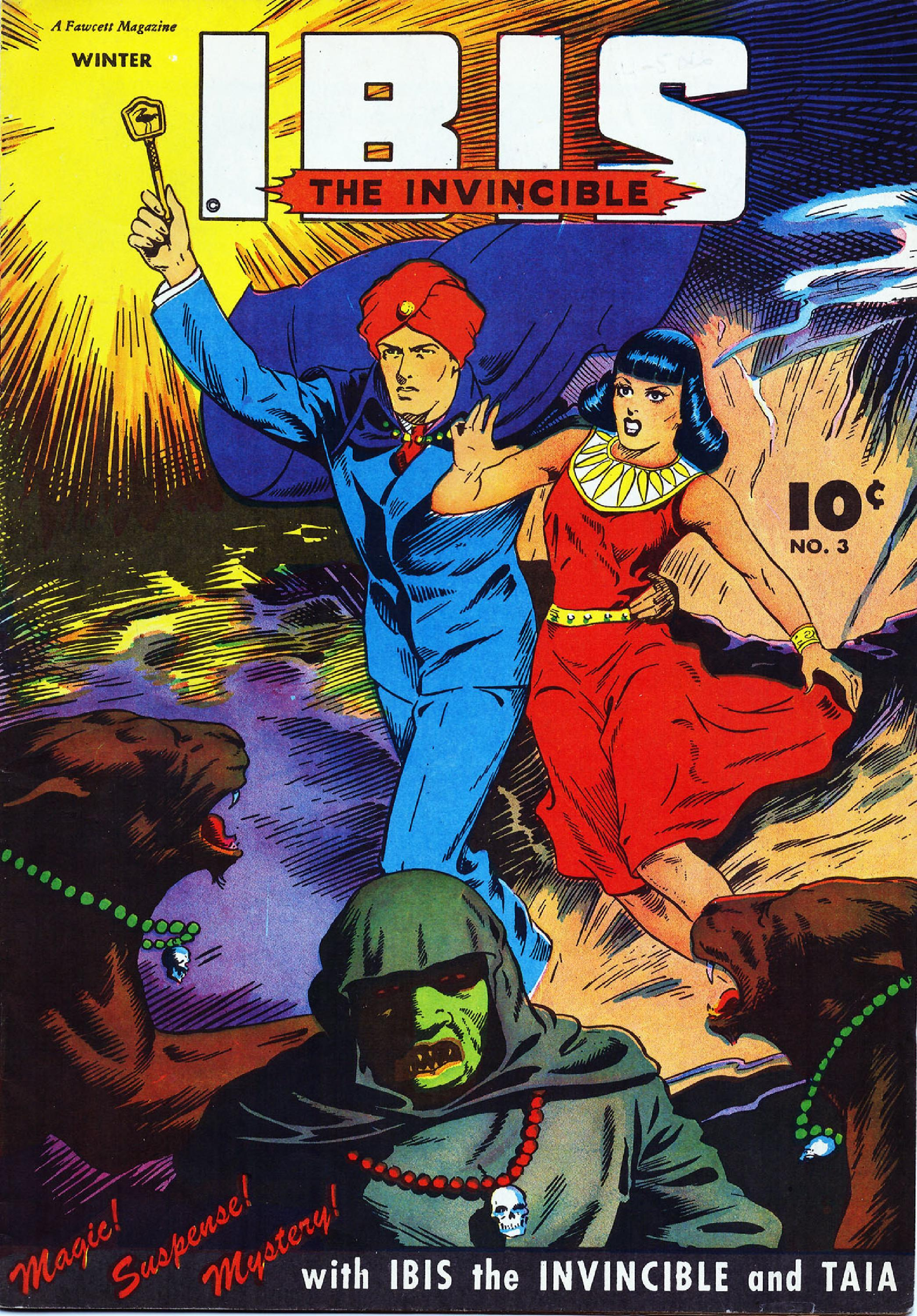
- Ibis the Invincible #3, art by Gus Ricca.

Publication information
- Publisher: Fawcett Comics (1940–1953); Charlton Comics (1955); DC Comics (1976–present)
- First appearance: (Amentep); Whiz Comics #2 (February 1940) (Khalifa); Helmet of Fate: Ibis the Invincible #1 (January 2007)
- Created by: (Amentep); Bob Kingett (artist) (Khalifa); Tad Williams (writer); Phil Winslade (artist)

In-story information
- Alter ego: Amentep/Ibis; Danny Khalifa
- Species: Metahuman (DC Comics)
- Place of origin: Ancient Egypt (Amentep/Ibis)
- Team affiliations: All-Star Squadron; Squadron of Justice
- Supporting character of: Captain Marvel/Shazam
- Notable aliases: Ibis the Mystic
- Abilities: Both versions of Ibis the Invincible possess profound magical powers derived from the Ibistick wand and proficiency in knowledge of the supernatural; Khalifa is capable of transforming to an older-aged version.

Ibis the Invincible (also Ibis the Mystic) is the name of two superheroes appearing in American comic books first published by Fawcett Comics, then Charlton Comics in 1955, and then DC Comics beginning in the 1970s. In 2022, the character also is published by Antarctic Press within Exciting Comics. Like many magician superheroes introduced in the Golden Age of Comics, Ibis owes much to the popular comic strip character Mandrake the Magician.

Within Fawcett Comics and later DC Comics publication, the original Ibis was ancient Egyptian prince and magician Amentep. An acolyte of Thoth, he bears the Ibistick, a powerful magical wand that can only be used for good. While making sporadic appearances in some titles, Amentep is established as an accomplished magician and an ally of the Wizard Shazam and the Marvel Family. The second Ibis and successor to Amentep is Daniel Khalifa, a high-school student and descendant of magician pharaohs, granting him magical potential. He is chosen by a dying Amentep to succeed him as the next Ibis due to his heritage. In the character's portrayal in Exciting Comics, Amentep is a composite character renamed simply Ibis although he retains a similar appearance and connection to love interest Taia, now a priest of Anubis. Ibis is reincarnated in the modern era as Daniel Khalifa (older than his prior depictions) and encounters an aged Taia, who reveals his true nature and Ibistick. Now with the memory of his past life and restoring Taia's youth, he battles the forces of evil while resuming his relationship with Taia.

== Publication history ==
The original Ibis first appeared in Whiz Comics #2 (February 1940), and was created by Bob Kingett. When superheroes declined in popularity in the early 1950s, Ibis and the other Fawcett characters ceased publication. One Ibis story shortly thereafter was reprinted by Charlton Comics. The Fawcett characters were later licensed and eventually bought outright by DC Comics in the 1970s. The second Ibis first appeared in Helmet of Fate: Ibis the Invincible #1 (January 2007), and was created by Tad Williams and Phil Winslade.

== Characterization ==
=== Amentep ===
Prince Amentep of Egypt was an acolyte of Thoth and next Pharaoh in line who fell in love with princess Taia of Thebes. Originally, Amentep travels to 1940 when Taia is poisoned and he places her and himself in suspended animation to heal, a process that took 4,000 years. He uses his mystic abilities in the modern era to battle evil. Ibis also once temporarily served as the guardian of the Rock of Eternity in place of ally and friend, the Wizard Shazam.

=== Daniel Khalifa ===
Daniel Kasam "Danny" Khalifa is an Egyptian-American high school student of average ability with the bloodline of the Hekau, ancient magician pharaohs whose abilities is hinted to be derived from the aforementioned deity. When chosen as the second Ibis and wielding the Ibistick, its appearance is that of a large magic staff and Daniel is transformed into an older adult form. As Ibis the Invincible, he is a mystic defender against forces of evil, especially mystic threats with connections to ancient Egypt.

=== Ibis / Daniel Kahlifa ===
A composite character of Amentep and Daniel Khalifa, Ibis is a sorcerer and prince whose origins is traced to ancient Egypt, known for his mastery of white magic, strong moral character, and pride for Egyptian history and culture. He falls in love with the High Priestess of Anubis, Taia, who serves as both his love interest and guide. After being reincarnated as Daniel Khalifa, he retains his strong moral character and appreciation for Egyptian culture and history. Upon discovering his past life, he sacrifices his youth to de-age Taia and resume his past life as a mystic defender, although the implications of him abandoning his previous life and its effects on his friends and family is a concern.

== Fictional history ==
=== Prince Amentep ===
Ibis begins his life as Amentep, a prince of ancient Egypt who was in love with the beautiful Princess Taia of Thebes. As a young man, Amentep is given the "Ibistick", a talisman of incredible power, by the Egyptian god Thoth, who empowers the talisman after Ibis was overthrown. Amentep's throne is eventually usurped – with the aid of a demonic army conjured up by the evil god Set – by a cruel magician known as the Black Pharaoh. When Taia, who is under the protection of Osiris, refuses to marry him, the Black Pharaoh shoots her with a poisoned arrow. Using his Ibistick, Amentep places his beloved in suspended animation to allow her to heal. He casts a similar spell upon himself, hoping to be present when Taia revives.

4000 years later, the mummy of Amentep returns to life in an American museum in 1940, which is later revealed to be the work of the wizard Shazam. Now called "Ibis", Amentep sets out in search of his beloved, eventually finding her at another museum. Seeking to adjust to this new world, Ibis uses his vast powers to become a crimefighter.

Ibis can do almost anything with the power of the Ibistick: build force-fields around cities, transport himself and others, heal or destroy people, bring people back to life or summon spirits, give superhuman powers, and even make objects appear out of thin air. Without the wand, he is powerless, which is frequently exploited by his enemies. The Ibistick apparently vibrates in the presence of evil, at one point it even wakes him up. Taia was once shown using the wand to make lightning strike a foe of Ibis, and often uses it at other times. It can be used by anybody, but not to cause harm directly to Ibis, or it will backfire on the user. It cannot be used directly against certain magics.

According to Jess Nevins' Encyclopedia of Golden Age Superheroes, "Ibis fights ordinary criminals, an animated and living Sphinx, the Yellow Peril Trug, a spider made man-sized and man-smart by the Ibistick, the superintelligent maimed madman Half-Man, the Dark Spirit (a forgotten god of wickedness), Ruthven the Warlock, and Lucifer himself".

Ibis and Taia next appear in a Justice League/Justice Society crossovers as members of a team referred to as Shazam's Squadron of Justice. These heroes live in a parallel universe on a world called Earth-S. Along with many other Earth-S characters, they were imprisoned in Doctor Sivana's Suspendium globe, but released twenty years later when it drifted near the Sun. Ibis was a member of the Squadron of Justice, organized to defeat King Kull when he paralyzed the Marvels and tried to destroy all three Earths. Ibis helped stop Mr. Atom from destroying the futuristic City of Tomorrow on Earth-One.

After the Crisis on Infinite Earths, Ibis and Taia were retconned as part of the Golden Age of the DC Universe, in which Ibis served alongside other wartime heroes in the All-Star Squadron. As noted in Starman Vol. 2, #40 (March 1998), Ibis tends to operate out of Fawcett City like other heroes, including Bulletman, Minute-Man, Spy Smasher, and the duo of Mr. Scarlet and Pinky the Whiz Kid.

Ibis was reintroduced in the modern DC Universe in The Power of Shazam! #11, in which he is resurrected by Mary Marvel and Uncle Dudley to rescue the wizard Shazam from Hell, where he had been imprisoned by the demoness Blaze. In Zatanna #1, part of the Seven Soldiers miniseries, Ibis and Taia presumably perish along with Doctor Thirteen and Timothy Ravenwind at the hands of Gwydion during a seance conducted by Zatanna. The sorceress blames her own shortcomings for their deaths.

=== Danny Khalifa ===
Amentep's successor is an Egyptian American boy named Danny Khalifa. Due to his ancient bloodline, Danny is chosen by Amentep to be his successor. He inherits the Ibistick and is thrust into a conflict between ancient Egyptian gods. As Ibis, Danny prevents the helmet of Doctor Fate from falling into the hands of Set. Danny is assisted by the deity Thoth, who becomes his mentor and frightens away the bullies.

=== Reign in Hell ===
Ibis returns to seek his new apprentice's services during the Reign in Hell miniseries. Tensions between the major demons and the Hell-empowered heroes and villains erupt into a struggle for the control of the Hell dimension. Danny accepts the summons. He is assisted by Black Alice, who offers guidance and covers for his absence on Earth. While in Hell, Black Alice betrays him to ensure her own safety, abandoning him to Neron's forces.He is later seen alive on Earth fighting against Frankenstein after being corrupted by the Starheart's energy.

== Enemies ==
Ibis the Invincible faces many powerful enemies. One of them is Apollyon, a demon summoned by a student. Apollyon kills a professor, but Ibis defeats him with the help of the professor's spirit and the Ibistick. Ibis also battles Black Rufe, a resurrected criminal, and Black Pharaoh, his evil sorcerous uncle. The Black Pharaoh tries to marry Taia, but Ibis defeats him. Ibis faces The Cat, a cult leader with nine lives, and Charon, the boatman of the river Styx. He also confronts Dalaghar, a thieving sorcerer, who is turned to stone after trying to escape. The Gorgons, who turn people to stone, are also defeated by Ibis using magical spectacles and Perseus' sword. Karnok, an evil sorcerer, and Ra-Tuth, an Egyptian wizard, oppose Ibis. Karnok tries to sacrifice Ibis but is sent to Hades. Ibis also battles the Moon-men, ancient rivals of humanity. They are revived but destroyed on the Moon. Murder Malone, a criminal who takes over an orphanage, is outsmarted by Ibis. Trug, a recurring villain seeking the Ibistick, and the Vampire Twins, Baron Ornzy and Maryani, are also defeated. Throughout all these battles, Ibis uses the power of the Ibistick and his own magic to protect Taia and defend the world from evil.

== Golden Age appearances ==
Ibis the Invincible appeared in:

- Whiz Comics #2–155 (Feb 1940 – June 1953)
- Ibis, the Invincible #1–6 (Jan 1942 – Sept 1948)
- American's Greatest #4 (Summer 1942)
- All Hero #1 (Mar 1945)
