= Squadron of Justice =

One-time superhero group of Fawcett Comics

- Squadron of Justice, art by Ernie Chan.

Publication information
- Publisher: DC Comics
- First appearance: Whiz Comics #21 (September 1941) first version, Justice League of America #135 (October 1976), second version.
- Created by: C.C. Beck (artist of first version), Martin Pasko (writer of second version), Dick Dillin (artist of second version)

In-story information
- Base(s): Rock of Eternity
- Member(s): Fawcett Comics; Captain Marvel; Lieutenant Marvels; DC Comics; Bulletman; Bulletgirl; Ibis the Invincible; Mister Scarlet; Pinky, The Whiz Kid

The Squadron of Justice was a name used by two superhero teams of characters who originated from Fawcett Comics. Each team only made one appearance in a single story.

== Fictional team history ==
=== First version ===
In Whiz Comics #21, the name had been applied to the somewhat obscure Marvel Family members known as the Lieutenant Marvels. Three young men from different areas of the country (Texas, the Ozarks and Brooklyn) all named Billy Batson were reading Captain Marvel’s comic book adventures and happened to wonder if saying "Shazam" would work for them as well. As it happened, Tall Billy, Hill Billy, and Fat Billy all said the word at the same time and were each transformed into one of the Lieutenant Marvels, having powers akin to Captain Marvel. They could only change if all three said the magic word at the same time along with the real Billy (in later appearances of the Lieutenant Marvels such as Shazam #30, this limitation was ignored, though none of them operated singly as a Marvel).

=== Second version ===
The "modern" Squadron of Justice appears in one storyline, in Justice League of America #135-137 (October–December 1976). Though the team was never called "Squadron of Justice" formally, it was referred to as "Shazam's Squadron of Justice" on the cover of Justice League of America #135.

Based on the parallel Earth known as Earth-S, the Squadron's members are the following superheroes:

- Bulletman and Bulletgirl: Jim Barr was a police scientist who had invented the Gravity Helmet (which enabled him and his wife Susan to fly through the air as human projectiles) and a formula which put his strength to humanity's peak.
- Ibis the Invincible: Prince Amentep was the son of an ancient Egyptian pharaoh who had been resurrected in modern times, along with his wife Princess Taia after they both went into suspended animation, as Taia needed to recover from a poisoned arrow, and Ibis wanted to wake up with her. Ibis uses the mystical Ibistick he had been given by the Egyptian god of wisdom Thoth and its incredible powers in his fight against crime and sorcerous menaces.
- Mister Scarlet and Pinky, The Whiz Kid: Attorney Brian Butler and his adopted son use their ace acrobatic skills and strange weaponry against all varieties of crime.
- Spy Smasher: Alan Armstrong was a Virginia sportsman who battled crime and enemies of America with his superb fighting abilities and technical know-how.

The team is gathered together by the god Mercury to save the elder gods, goddesses and the wizard Shazam from an assault by King Kull of the Beastmen who has paralyzed them using a ray that slowed down their impulses after getting to the Rock of Eternity in a ship that travels faster than light. Mercury also gathers heroes from the Justice League of Earth-One (Superman, Green Lantern, the Flash, Green Arrow, Hawkman and Hawkgirl) and the Justice Society of Earth-Two (Batman, Robin, Green Lantern, Flash, Wonder Woman, and Johnny Thunder and Thunderbolt) to deal with the situation, Because of Shazam's paralysis, he is unable to send out the magic lightning that transforms Billy Batson, Mary Batson, and Freddy Freeman into the Marvel Family.

King Kull plans to completely destroy mankind on all three Earths so that his subjugated Beast-Men could once again rule over all, as humanity had rebelled and killed most of then. Superman, Wonder Woman, Spy Smasher and Green Arrow headed to Earth-Two to battle King Kull's agents there: Queen Clea of Earth-Two, Penguin of Earth-One, Blockbuster of Earth-One, and Ibac of Earth-S. Queen Clea was planning to take over the entire continent of Atlantis (on Earth-Two, Atlantis had recently risen from the depths and was inhabited by two nations ruled by women; the inhabitants also learned to survive without mutating into water-breathers, like the inhabitants of Aquaman’s city on Earth-One did).

The villains are dispatched with relative ease. Spy Smasher tricks Ibac into saying "I back down from no-one", triggering the transformation. Superman easily defeats Blockbuster, but a strange cloud appears over a nearby island and causes it to sink beneath the waves again in a very destructive fashion, which King Kull planned to have happen to every continent and island on Earth. Superman uses his super-breath to freeze the cloud. He throws the block of ice into the head of a passing comet, ending the threat. The heroes head back to Earth-S as Atlantis disappears beneath the waves again.

On Earth-S, a series of destructive and incredibly strange occurrences happen worldwide. A very odd eclipse occurs that keeps one side of the planet in perpetual darkness and the other side in continual light. Volcanic activity in the Canadian Rockies is witnessed by Hawkman, Hawkgirl, Bulletman and Bulletgirl. When Hawkman flies too near to one of the volcanoes, his shoulder begins to petrify into stone. Off the coast of Atlantis, an iceberg moves through the water at high speed, transforming anything near it (including people) into ice. Rock formations come to life in the Garden of the Gods in Colorado and begin turning people into stone.

Billy Batson, ace news anchor at Station WHIZ in New York City (and the alter-ego of Captain Marvel), reports that the steel frame of a building being constructed downtown has walked away after turning all the construction workers on it into iron. Batman, Robin, Mr. Scarlet and Pinky investigate that situation, and Batman gets too close to the structure. His jaw turns to iron, making it very difficult for him to speak. They examine the bodies of the transformed workers and find they all had the unique grin usually associated with the effects of the Joker's poison gas. The Joker of Earth-Two is working with an old enemy of Bulletman - the Weeper of Earth-S. The two send more gas into a local jewelry store, which first acts as laughing gas, then transforms the people inside into living diamonds. The diamonds and jewels follow the two criminals out of the store to their hideout. Mr. Scarlet notices the marks on the sidewalk made by the moving gems, and the four heroes follow the trail and made quick work of the two villains and their thugs, with Mr. Scarlet being immune to the Weeper's tear gas due to his goggles.

The heroes give a sample of the Joker's poison gas to Jim Barr (Bulletman) for analysis, as now Pinky's hair has also turned to diamond during the fight, but the analysis reveals that the gas was nothing but nitrous oxide, which means that some other force is at work on all the inanimate objects. Bulletgirl and the Hawks review photographs from a news service of more super-villains causing trouble on the dark side of the world. The heroes of Earths One and Two identify them as Doctor Light of Earth-One and Shade of Earth-One. The flying heroes switch partners to hopefully confuse the villains, with Bulletman and Hawkman heading after the Shade, and Bulletgirl and Hawkgirl tackling Doctor Light. At the Louvre, the Shade is causing all the figures in the classical paintings to become real people and move off their canvasses. Bulletman finds that as he gets close to any of the figures, his hand began changing, becoming two-dimensional. Hawkman's wings blow the painted people away, and the two heroes pursue the Shade. Bulletman uses his Gravity Helmet to repel the Shade's darkness cane from his hands. As Hawkman attempts to use it to stop the darkness (which is being caused by an overhead satellite), even the Shade is surprised that nothing happened. Hawkgirl and Bulletgirl face Doctor Light at Yellowstone National Park. After Dr. Light's holographic duplicates trick them into the paths of some geysers, the two reach the villain, who is already petrified into solid stone. Bulletgirl's arm is also turned to stone when she gets too close. Light's duplicates are sentient and tell them to get Light's weapon to make a satellite "turn day back into night". One of the satellites is revealed to be acting as a second sun. Bulletgirl retrieves the weapon (apparently with her already petrified arm) and Hawkgirl shoots the gun at the satellite in the sky above them, but again nothing happens. As the heroes regroup to discuss their options, they decide to use each weapon to move the satellites until they crash together. The destruction of the two devices causes everything to revert to normal, including the transformed body parts of the heroes.

The Green Lanterns, the Flashes, Ibis and Mercury headed to Earth-One, where an enlarged Mister Atom of Earth-S and Brainiac of Earth-One are attacking a futuristic model city called Tomorrow. A strange black feedback aura prevents the heroes from attacking the giant Mister Atom directly, and the Green Lanterns are able to trace the source of the aura to Brainiac's spaceship, hovering above the domed city. Ibis and both Green Lanterns attempt to stop Brainiac. Ibis creates an aura around himself and other heroes to protect them. The three speedsters work overtime, repairing the damage and saving the people that Mister Atom's rampage was endangering. Green Lantern of Earth-One passes through the side of Brainiac's ship and is subjected to the "Barium Effect", which transforms him into a living skeleton. Ibis arrives in time to stop Brainiac from killing the hero, turning the robot villain's own weapon against him. Ibis changes Green Lantern back to normal, and the two heroes destroyed Brainiac's machines, causing the black aura around Mister Atom to disappear. It is revealed the falling people are really being caused by the rotation of the Earth being increased by the speedsters as they try to repair the city as fast as Mister Atom can destroy it. The two Green Lanterns attempt to stop the device that is making gravity act strangely, while Ibis returns to the city of Tomorrow. Ibis is attacked by a blast from Mister Atom and stunned before he can finish instructing the Ibistick how to contain the robot. Mister Atom attempts to use the Ibistick to send the hero to a distant star, but a fail-safe in the magicks of the Ibistick cause Mister Atom to suffer the fate he had wished on Ibis. He is later returned by the evil alien worm Mister Mind.

Soon after, all of the heroes headed to the Rock of Eternity, where King Kull has the Elder Gods and Shazam as prisoners. Taking the lead, Superman flies inside. He is surprised by King Kull who has a hunk of Red Kryptonite. The unpredictable element influences Superman's mind, filling him with a raging desire to kill. In the meantime, Mercury had sent Johnny Thunder to find the alter-egos of the Marvel Family, though they were first worried he would reveal their identities. After Johnny inadvertently says his magic word "Cei-U", his Thunderbolt appears and transforms the three kids into their Marvel counterparts. The Thunderbolt then takes all four heroes to the Rock of Eternity, where Captain Marvel knocks out the King of the Beast-Men, Junior destroys the Red Kryptonite, and Mary frees the Elders. Superman remains in a murderous rage; this dose of Red Kryptonite has also made him immune to the deadly effects of Green Kryptonite, which the Green Lanterns had tried to use to stop him (manufacturing it with their power rings). Remembering that Superman is vulnerable to magic, Captain Marvel flies directly at Superman and says his magic word "Shazam" as he approaches. The magic lightning breaks the spell of the Red Kryptonite, returning Superman to normal who saves Billy before he is injured from falling. King Kull is imprisoned with magic chains that supposedly even Hercules cannot break, and the heroes returned to their own worlds.
