= This Magazine Is Haunted =

Horror comic book

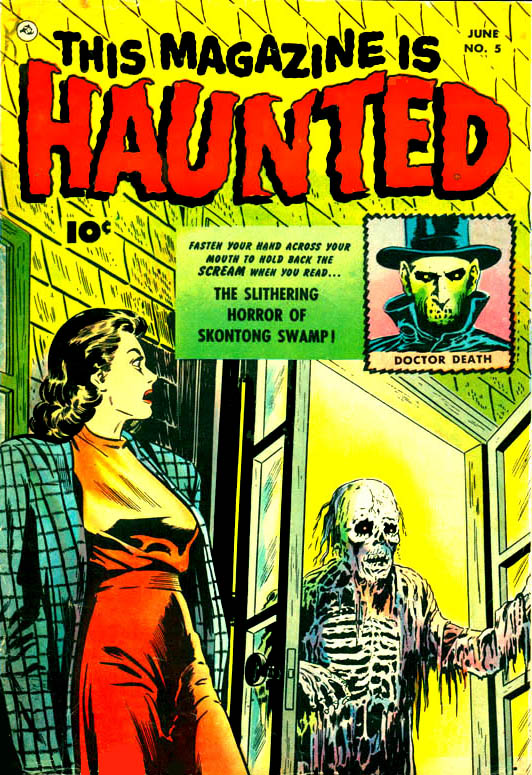
- Haunted #5, published by Fawcett Comics (June 1952). Cover by Sheldon Moldoff

Publication information
- Publisher: Fawcett Comics; Charlton Comics
- Schedule: Bimonthly
- Format: Ongoing series
- Genre: Horror
- Publication date: Vol. 1: Oct. 1951 – Dec. 1953 (Fawcett); Feb. – Nov. 1954 (Charlton); Vol. 2: July 1957 – May 1958
- No. of issues: Vol. 1 : 14 (Fawcett); 7 (Charlton); Vol 2.: 5
- Main character: Doctor Death

Creative team
- Created by: Sheldon Moldoff
- Artist(s): Sheldon Moldoff, Steve Ditko
- Editor(s): Will Leiberson, Al Jetter

This Magazine Is Haunted is a horror comic that was originally published by Fawcett between 1951 and 1953. Running 14 issues, it was the first of Fawcett's supernatural line; a string of titles which included Beware! Terror Tales, Worlds of Fear, Strange Suspense Stories, and Unknown Worlds.

After Fawcett ceased publication, This Magazine Is Haunted was sold to and published by Charlton Comics from 1954 to 1958.

== Format ==
Debuting with a cover date of October 1951, This Magazine Is Haunted was Fawcett's first successful attempt to enter the lucrative horror market with a comic devoted specifically to supernatural fiction. The book represented a break from Fawcett's more familiar product, which ranged from superheroes (Captain Marvel) to movie adaptations and teen humor. Created by Sheldon Moldoff and edited by Will Leiberson and Al Jetter, the book was loosely modeled after EC's New Trend, particularly their highly successful horror titles.

Like its better-known competitors, This Magazine Is Haunted was notable for its black humor and frequent O. Henry climaxes. Drawing on the considerable creative resources of the Fawcett stable, Haunted storylines dealt with the standard horror themes of the period: vengeance from beyond the grave, macabre retribution and 'dark' justice, all of which were presented with an appropriate level of irony.

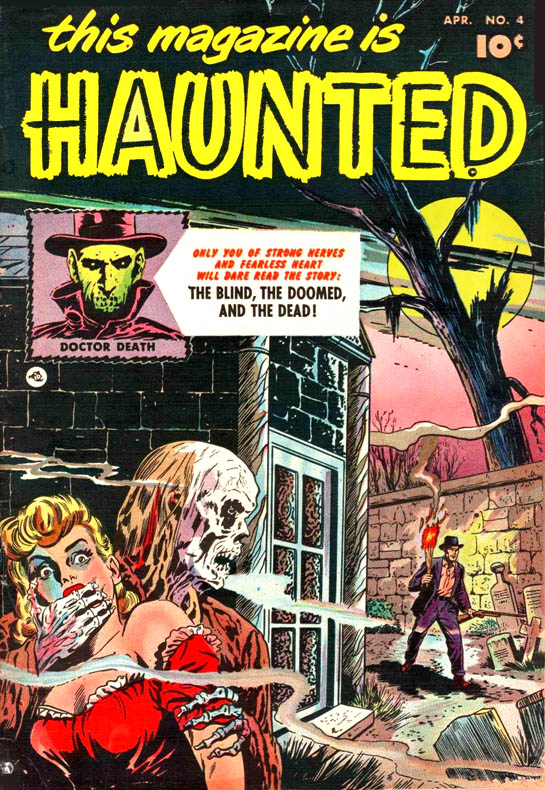
Haunted #4 (April 1952). Cover art by Sheldon Moldoff. A typically gruesome cover featuring a walking corpse

Human folly played a key role in many stories; characters were constantly led into disaster by their own greed, stupidity or outright corruption. Numerous plots revolved around violent criminals meeting grisly but entirely deserving fates, while others featured hapless bystanders trapped in bizarre or terrifying circumstances.

Comics historian Stephen Sennitt describes the Fawcett line as "genuinely eerie" in contrast to EC's more visceral approach.

Aside from the evident cinematic influences, Haunted and its companions followed at least two literary traditions derived from the pulp literature of the previous decades. The first was the Crime-Horror imagery of magazines like Black Mask or Flynn's Detective Fiction, which emphasized murder, violence, and horrific crimes. Many authorities believe that the tradition was passed down to the 1950s horror genre via the crime comics of the later forties; Haunted featured numerous stories combining the two areas.

Of course, by far the most potent influence on This Magazine Is Haunted was the horror comic genre itself, which according to Watt-Evans, represented around one-sixth of the comics market at its 1954 peak.

== Doctor Death ==
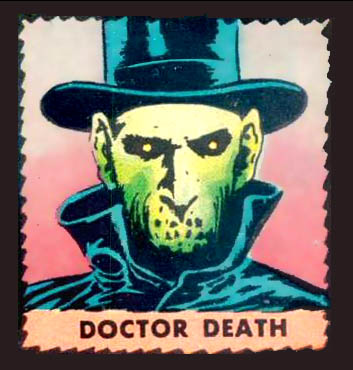
Haunted's cadaverous host, Doctor Death.

Once more following EC's example, Haunted featured mainly non-continuing stories narrated by a suitably malevolent host, the cadaverous Doctor Death. Resembling a decaying corpse dressed as a Victorian undertaker, Doctor Death played much the same role as The Crypt Keeper in Tales From the Crypt, breaking the fourth wall to provide explanations and plot details. Unlike EC's so-called "GhouLunatics" however, Dr. Death frequently orchestrated events in the narrative, acting as the hand of Fate and even driving the characters towards their ultimate destruction. To this end, he was capable of taking on human form to interact with his intended victims, feeding them bad advice or (somewhat maliciously) betraying their trust at crucial moments.

Dr. Death resembled Mr. Crime, the cartoon mascot from Lev Gleason Publications' Crime Does Not Pay. Both wore vintage clothing and had, to varying degrees, an inhuman appearance.

First appearing on the cover of Haunted #1, Doctor Death was the series' host until its cancellation in 1953. He returned for a number of issues when the magazine was acquired by Charlton Comics in 1954. As rendered by Charlton stalwart Steve Ditko, Doctor Death took on a progressively less skeletal appearance.

== The Beyond ==
Haunted was notable for employing "The Beyond" as a unifying element to many of its storylines. While the idea was not used consistently, it became a recurring plot device in all of Fawcett's horror titles, sometimes playing an essential role in the narrative.

The Beyond was a mysterious plane of existence which occasionally encroached on the physical world. A shadowy limbo vaguely akin to the Afterlife, it served as the source of the many supernatural menaces which threatened the "Realm of the Living". In a number of cases, it was a grey, lifeless Purgatory inhabited by rotting corpses; in others, a place of perpetual torment akin to Hell (although it was never specifically defined as such).

The Beyond seemed to be the abode of all of humanity's worst fears; vampires, ghosts and demons existed alongside dragons, witches and harpies. All seemed generally hostile towards mankind; some periodically crossed over to prey on selected victims or to seek vengeance on former tormentors. The traffic appeared to flow in both directions; mortals could inadvertently find themselves trapped in the Beyond before the end of their natural lives.

Access to the Beyond took numerous forms. Ghostly express trains made midnight runs to the other side, carrying the spirits of the recently departed. Phantom cruise liners ferried moldering passengers through the Sea of the Dead. Unwary travellers often found themselves making a one-way trip on the Road to Nowhere. Sometimes, mechanised transport was completely unnecessary - swamps, caves and haunted houses all seemed to lie within the outer boundaries of The Beyond.

== Sale to Charlton ==
Along with many other titles of a similar vein, This Magazine Is Haunted came under fire during the anti-comics backlash of the early 1950s. Generally speaking, however, its content was not quite as visceral as its rivals. Ironically, this was not the reason for the title's cancellation; Fawcett dropped its entire comics line in 1953, largely as a result of an industry-wide sales slump and a long-running legal battle with DC Comics.

Fawcett sold most of its properties to Charlton Comics in 1954, a deal which included the four horror titles. Evidently, Haunted was successful enough to continue publishing under its original numbering, starting with #15 (February 1954). The final issue of this first Charlton run was #21 (November 1954). For a time at least, Charlton attempted to maintain the moody atmosphere of its predecessor, even retaining the services of Doctor Death as the series' narrator. While not quite up to Fawcett's standards artistically, Charlton's run was distinguished by some of Steve Ditko's earliest work in the supernatural genre. After the establishment of the Comics Code in 1954, the content was toned down considerably, dealing with magic, mystery and suspense rather than with outright horror.

The magazine was rebooted two years later, restarting with #12 in 1957. Doctor Death was replaced by Doctor Haunt (possibly designed by Ditko, by now the title's lead artist). The comic continued bi-monthly another two years despite the financial problems besetting the comics industry at the time. The final issue of the second Charlton run was #16 (May 1958).
