= Golden Arrow (comics) =

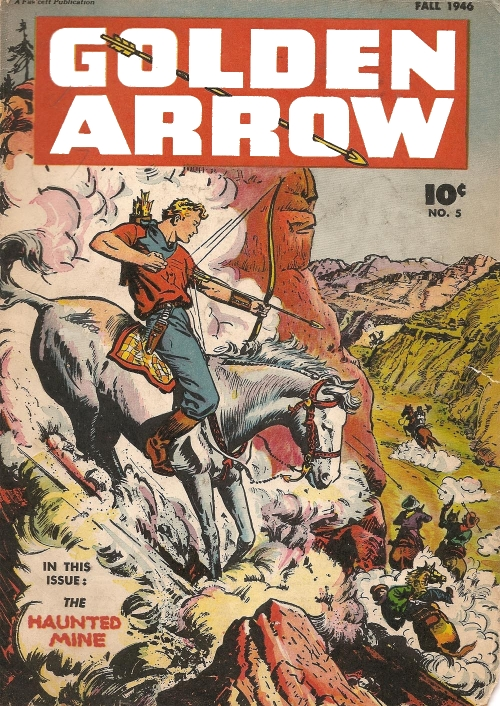
- Front cover of the 1946 American comic book Golden Arrow #5 illustrated by Harry Parkhurst.

Publication information
- Publisher: Fawcett Comics
- First comic appearance: Whiz Comics #2 (February 1940)
- Created by: Bill Parker, Greg Duncan

In-story information
- Alter ego: Roger Parsons
- Species: Human

Golden Arrow is a superhero that appeared in American comic books published by Fawcett Comics. Created by writer Bill Parker and artist Greg Duncan, he first appeared in Whiz Comics #2.

== Character history ==
Golden Arrow was Roger Parsons who, as a young boy, went on a cross-country balloon trip with his parents. His father, Professor Paul Parsons, was testing out an invention that was supposed to revolutionize aviation, but he and his wife were both killed by their greedy rival Brand Braddock. Roger was found and raised by "Nugget Ned" and became the superhero Golden Archer when he grew up. He would coat his arrows in gold leaf and ride a horse named White Wind. He would fight "angry natives, evil cowboys and outlaws, talking totem poles, the female shootist the Gun Ghost, the killer Desolation, and Butu, the Ancient Bow-Man."

The book appeared to be set in the Wild West, but Golden Arrow would occasionally make appearances alongside Captain Marvel.

The character lasted from Whiz Comics #2, which was the book's first issue, until Whiz Comics #154, which was its second-to-last. He also appeared in his own series which lasted six issues.
