= Wow Comics =

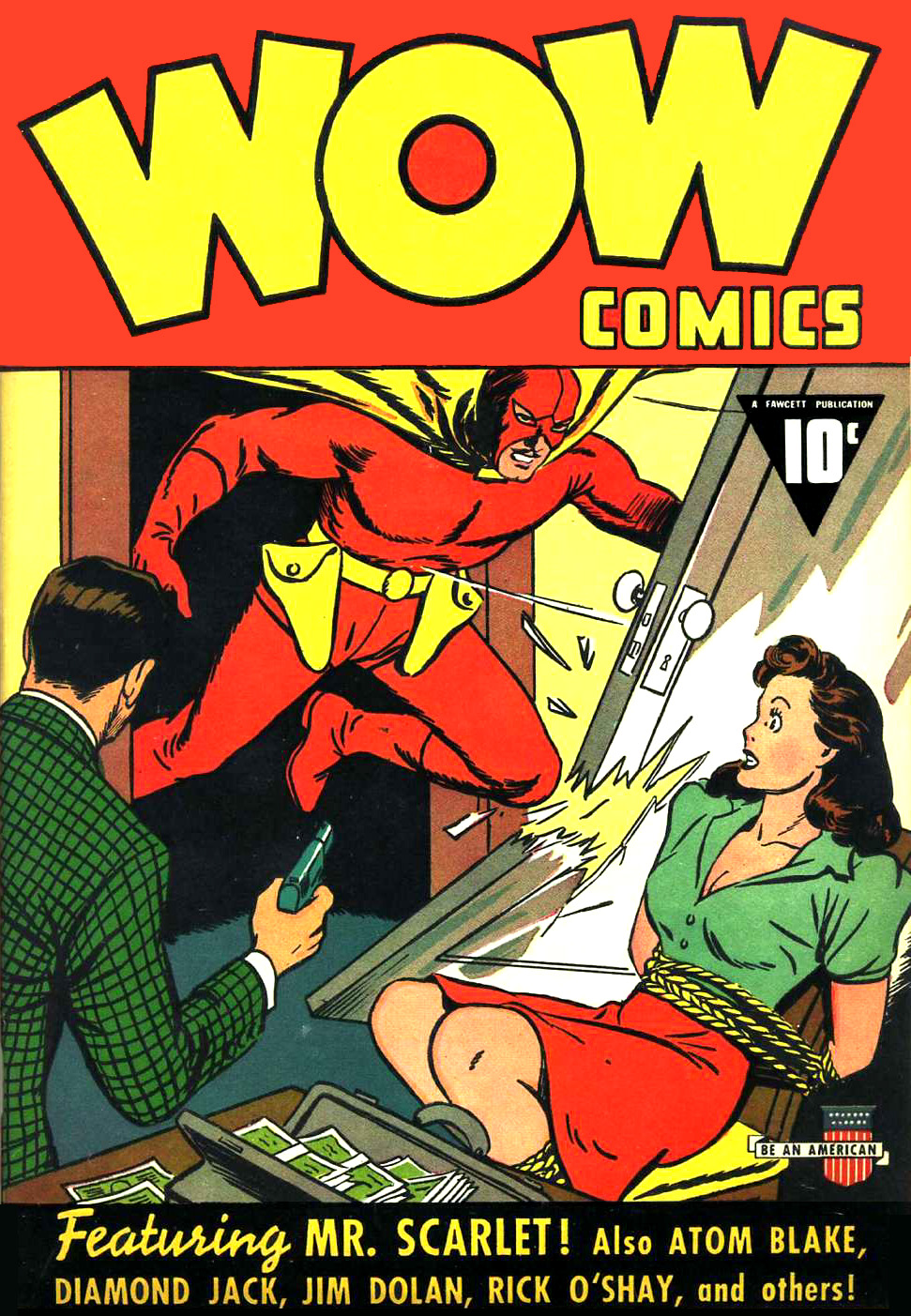
- Issue #1 of Wow Comics. Art by C. C. Beck.

Publication information
- Publisher: Fawcett Comics
- Schedule: Monthly
- Format: Anthology
- Publication date: Winter 1940 – Aug. 1948
- No. of issues: 69
- Main character: Mary Marvel

Wow Comics is a monthly Golden Age comic book anthology series that was published by Fawcett Comics from winter 1940 to August 1948.

From issue #9 to #58, the book's cover features were the solo adventures of Fawcett's Mary Marvel character. Other characters included Mr. Scarlet, Commando Yank and Phantom Eagle.

The title's inaugural issue was the first comic book mentioning of Gotham City. Wow Comics later evolved into a boys' title beginning with issue #59.

== Publication history ==
The book changed the format to a Western comic and was renamed Real Hero Western with issue #70, and Western Hero from issue #76 until the book's final issue, #112, in 1952.
