= Bulletman and Bulletgirl =

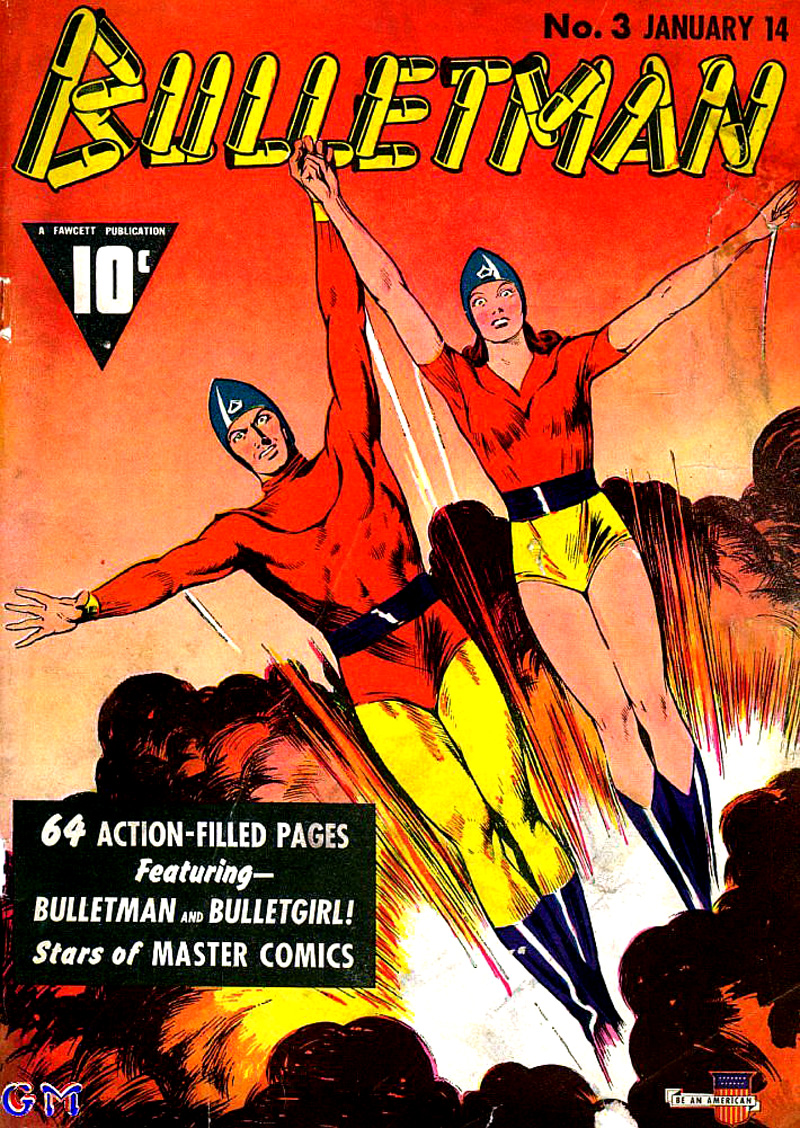
- Cover of Bulletman #3 (1942), art by Mac Raboy.

Publication information
- Publisher: Fawcett Comics (1939–1953); DC Comics (1976–present)
- First appearance: Nickel Comics #1 (1940, historical); The Power of Shazam! #8 (1995) (canon)
- Created by: Bill Parker; Jon Smalle

In-story information
- Alter ego: James "Jim" Barr and Susan Kent-Barr
- Team affiliations: Squadron of Justice; All-Star Squadron; Justice League
- Abilities: Chemically-induced superhuman strength and intelligence Gravity Regulator Helmet grants them: Flight; Bullet deflection

Bulletman and Bulletgirl are superheroes originally published by Fawcett Comics.

== Publication history ==
Created by Bill Parker and Jon Smalle, Bulletman first appeared in Nickel Comics #1 (May 1940). This comic was distinct from others on the market at the time, because it cost five cents (as opposed to the usual 10-cent price), was half as long as the standard 64-page comic, and came out every two weeks instead of every four.

== Fictional character biography ==
Jim Barr was the son of a police officer who was killed in the line of duty and as a result took it upon himself to fight crime. He was rejected from the police academy for physical reasons, but got a job in ballistics. Like many characters of the time, he used chemistry to develop powers for himself, in his case greater muscle mass and brain power using his "crime cure". He also invented a bullet-shaped Gravity Regulator Helmet which allowed him to fly and deflect bullets. His first case involved capturing a gangster in his hideout. He has fought the supercriminal Blackmask, the rat-man Black Rat and the devious Mara Myle.

Shortly after Bulletman began his crime-fighting career, he created a second helmet for his girlfriend and later wife Susan Kent, daughter of Police Sergeant Kent who adopted the name Bulletgirl. His formula was shown to make him strong enough to smash a tank. In addition to being bullet-shaped, their helmets also make the characters bulletproof. The helmet is shown to be so strong that once when Bulletgirl was run over by a Nazi tank she was only knocked out.

After Bulletgirl's arrival, the pair fought a variety of weird, supernatural-themed villains including the Unholy Three, the Son of Dracula, the Man Without a Face, the Black Spider and the Limping Mummy. They also fought criminal fashion plate the Dude.

Bulletman and Bulletgirl were Fawcett Comics' second most popular characters after Captain Marvel and the Marvel Family. They were leased by DC Comics along with the rest of Fawcett Comics' stable of characters in 1972. However, the characters lapsed into public domain prior to the said acquisition, which later allowed AC Comics to reprint their Golden Age adventures.

During this period of time, Bulletman and Bulletgirl appeared with fellow Fawcett heroes to form Shazam's Squadron of Justice against the forces of King Kull, who was trying to wipe out humanity on all three Earths after capturing all the beings who gave the Marvels their powers. Bulletman and Bulletgirl battled villains on Earth-S, the Earth-2 Joker, Weeper, Shade, and Doctor Light. Their age appeared to be as it was in the 1940s without explanation. They subsequently appeared a few times with Captain Marvel and his family.

Bulletman and Bulletgirl were eventually retrofitted into DC Universe continuity, and have been speculated to be members of the All-Star Squadron, although this has not been confirmed in a printed comic. For example, it is established that during World War II, Bulletman met the long-lived Green Lantern Abin Sur. In issues #39–40 of Starman James Barr is accused of being a traitor to the United States. He is seemingly implicated in the Nazi attack on the Normandie ocean liner in New York. This contradicts what is known by Jack Knight's father Ted Knight, whose life Barr saved in Alaska, on the day of the Normandie attack. Constrained by promises of confidentiality to the same government that is prosecuting him, Barr goes on the run with Ted while Minute-Man tries to get the secret oath rescinded. Captain Marvel, currently much younger than Bulletman, fights with Jack Knight in an attempt to arrest Barr. Captain Marvel fails in his mission against Barr, partly because Jack is backed up by human police officers.

=== Windshear ===
In The Power of Shazam! #32 (November 1997), James Barr and Susan Kent-Barr were given a daughter named Deanna Barr, who donned her mother's helmet and operated briefly under the name Windshear (not to be confused with the Marvel Comics superhero of the same name). She teamed up with her father on his last adventure, to rescue Billy Batson, Mary Bromfield and Freddy Freeman from the villain Chain Lightning.

=== Bulleteer ===
In 2005, a new Bulletgirl known as Bulleteer was introduced as one of the Seven in Grant Morrison's Seven Soldiers of Victory. She is unrelated to these older heroes, though her costume is to some extent inspired by theirs. In issue #3, Susan Barr appeared in a brief cameo visiting her successor.

=== Infinite Crisis ===
Bulletman and Bulletgirl later re-appeared in the pages of Infinite Crisis on the newly reborn Earth-S along with the other Fawcett superheroes.

== Powers and abilities ==
After injecting themselves with a chemical, Bulletman and Bulletgirl gained superhuman strength and intelligence. They also wear a bullet-shaped helmet which allows them to fly and deflect bullets.

== Appearances ==
Bulletman and Bulletgirl appeared in:

- Nickel Comics #1–8 (May–Aug 1940)
- Master Comics #7–82, 84–106 (Oct 1940 – Aug 1949)
- Bulletman #1–16 (Summer 1941 – Fall 1946)
- America's Greatest Comics #1–8 (Fall 1941 – Summer 1943)
- Mary Marvel #8 (Dec 1946)
- Whiz Comics #106 (Feb 1949)

== Other versions ==
In the late 1970s, the Hasbro toy company produced an apparently unlicensed Bulletman action figure as part of its G.I. Joe toy line. This foot-tall toy was similar in appearance to the classic Fawcett character, except that it had vacuum-metalized silver arms, and bare legs.

Bulletman and Bulletgirl also appeared in Alex Ross and Mark Waid's Kingdom Come limited series.
