= Mr. Scarlet and Pinky the Whiz Kid =

Comic book superheroes

Mr. Scarlet and Pinky the Whiz Kid are a duo of comic book superheroes introduced in Wow Comics and making appearances in several other comics in later years. The superheroes were originally published by Fawcett Comics and later by DC Comics. The original Mr. Scarlet is Brian Butler, who debuted in Wow Comics #1 (cover-dated Winter 1940-41), and was created by France Herron and Jack Kirby; while Pinky Butler (Brian's adopted son) becomes his sidekick, Pinky the Whiz Kid. After Brian's death, Pinky takes over the role as Mr. Scarlet in DC's continuity. Pinky Butler premiered in the fourth issue of Wow Comics.

== Publication history ==
Mr. Scarlet, created by writer France Herron and artist Jack Kirby, debuted in Fawcett Comics' Wow Comics #1 (Winter 1940-41). He was the cover feature for five issues of that anthology comic. Scarlet later appeared in Fawcett's Mary Marvel #9 (February 1947). After the Fawcett properties were acquired by National Comics Publications, the future DC Comics, Scarlet appeared in Justice League of America #135-137 (Oct.-Dec. 1976).

== Fictional character biography ==
=== Brian Butler ===
Brian Butler
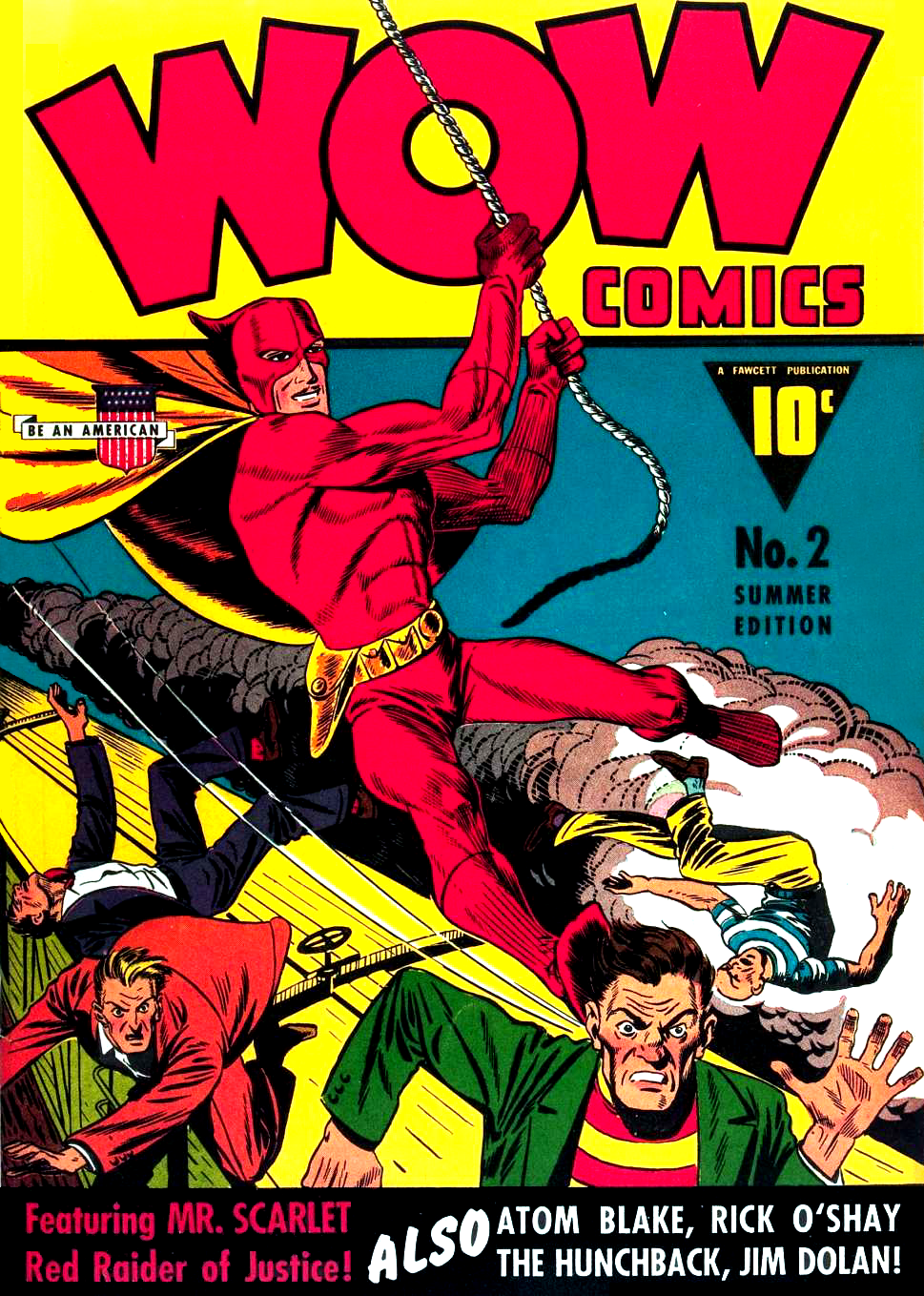
- Mister Scarlet from Wow Comics #2, artist Jack Binder.

Publication information
- Publisher: Fawcett Comics; DC Comics
- First appearance: Wow Comics #1 (Winter 1940-41)
- Created by: France Herron (writer); Jack Kirby (artist)

In-story information
- Alter ego: Brian Butler
- Species: Human
- Team affiliations: Squadron of Justice; All-Star Squadron
- Notable aliases: Mr. Scarlet
- Abilities: Olympic level athlete Keen investigative skills Use of utility belt

Mr. Scarlet is district attorney (DA) Brian Butler, who along with his adopted son Pinky the Whiz Kid, has fought evil in his city for several years. His success as a superhero is such that his employment as a DA is frequently in jeopardy due to a lack of crime. As a result throughout his series, he takes up several odd jobs to supplement his family's income. He uses inventive devices to help him apprehend criminals, and has great acrobatic and hand-to-hand combatant skills.

In his first appearance in Wow Comics #1, Brian is based in Gotham City. Later retcons established Mr. Scarlet's base in either New York City or Fawcett City.

The heroes tangle with a wide variety of villains, including the sinister Death Battalion, who plan the assassinations of top government officials. The Battalion's members include Dr. Death, the Ghost, the Horned Hood, the Black Thorn, the Black Clown, the Laughing Skull, and their leader known as "the Brain", who is actually the warden of El Catraz prison.

Although initially appearing in the 1940s, Mr. Scarlet and Pinky were revealed to still be active and at relatively the same age level in the 1970s during a team-up with the Justice League of America and Justice Society of America in Justice League of America 135-137. The two joined with several other heroes from Earth-S to form the Squadron of Justice.

=== Pinky Butler ===
Pinky Butler

Publication information
- Publisher: Fawcett Comics; DC Comics
- First appearance: Wow Comics #4 (Winter 1941-42)

In-story information
- Alter ego: Pinkerton "Pinky" Butler
- Species: Human
- Team affiliations: Squadron of Justice; All-Star Squadron
- Notable aliases: Pinky the Whiz Kid; Mr. Scarlet
- Abilities: Olympic level athlete Keen investigative skills Use of utility belt

Pinky is the adopted son and sidekick of Mr. Scarlet. Although initially appearing in the 1940s, Scarlet and Pinky were revealed to still be active and at relatively the same age level in the 1970s during a team-up with the Justice League and Justice Society.

After Crisis on Infinite Earths, Pinky Butler is revealed to have taken over the identity of Mr. Scarlet after his death, having been active in Fawcett City for several years. It is also revealed how they retained their youth since the 1940s: the wizard Shazam provided a protective field around the city for decades, resulting in its inhabitants to age slower than their contemporaries in other cities.

In "The New Golden Age", Pinky is among the captives of the Time Scavenger Childminder. After Childminder is defeated, Pinky and the Lost Children are brought to the present day, as returning them to their own time would cause a time paradox.

== Other versions ==
An alternate universe version of Mr. Scarlet appears in the Elseworlds series Kingdom Come and The Kingdom.
