= Fawcett Comics =

Defunct comic books publisher

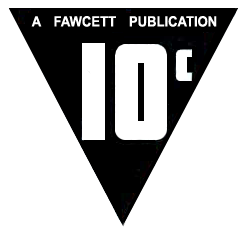
- Industry: Comics
- Genre: Superhero, horror
- Predecessor: Fawcett Publications
- Founded: 1939; 87 years ago
- Founder: Wilford Fawcett
- Defunct: 1953; 73 years ago
- Fate: Lash Larue, Jungle Girl, Strange Suspense Stories, & several other Fawcett IP sold to Charlton Comics in 1954; Captain Marvel intellectual properties acquired by DC Comics from Fawcett Publications in 1991.
- Successor: Charlton Comics DC Comics
- Headquarters: New York City, New York, United States
- Parent: Fawcett Publications

Fawcett Comics, a division of Fawcett Publications, was one of several successful comic book publishers during the Golden Age of Comic Books in the 1940s. Its most popular character was Captain Marvel, the alter ego of radio reporter Billy Batson, who transformed into the hero whenever he said the magic word "Shazam!".

Other characters published by Fawcett include Captain Video, Hopalong Cassidy, Ibis the Invincible, Bulletman and Bulletgirl, Spy Smasher, Captain Midnight, Phantom Eagle, Mr. Scarlet and Pinky the Whiz Kid, Minute-Man, Commando Yank and Golden Arrow.

Aside from the better known superhero books, Fawcett also published a short-lived line of horror comics during the early 1950s, a string of titles which included This Magazine Is Haunted, Beware! Terror Tales, Worlds of Fear, Strange Suspense Stories, and Unknown World. Other genres included teenage humor (Ozzie and Babs), cartoon animal (Hoppy the Marvel Bunny), romance (Sweethearts), war (Soldier Comics) and Western (Six Gun Heroes). Fawcett also produced comics based on contemporary movie stars (Tom Mix, Lash LaRue, Monte Hale) and matinee serials (Nyoka the Jungle Girl). The entire line was dropped in 1953, when Fawcett closed down their comics publishing wing (though many titles were picked up by Charlton Comics).

== History ==
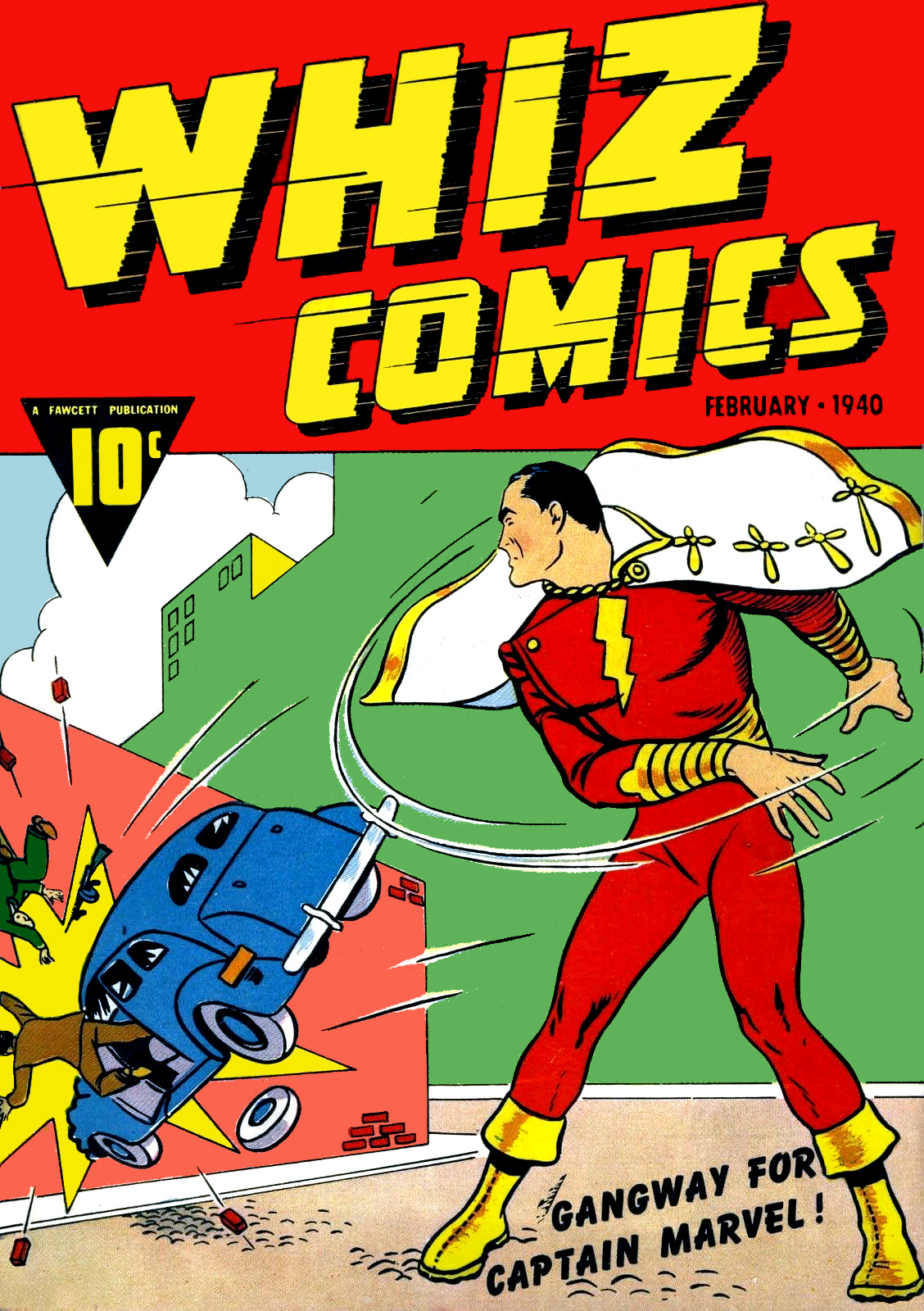
Whiz Comics #2 (February 1940), the first appearance of Captain Marvel, the company's most popular character. Cover art by C. C. Beck.

Fawcett Publications was founded by Wilford Fawcett in 1919 with the magazine Captain Billy's Whiz Bang and eventually expanded into a line of periodicals with a combined circulation of ten million a month. The company joined in the explosion of comic book publications in the United States in the late 1930s and early 1940s. Its initial entry, developed by writer Bill Parker and artist C. C. Beck, was Thrill Comics #1 (January 1940), a single issue of which was published only as an ashcan copy. The content was then reworked (for example, the lead character of Captain Thunder was renamed to Captain Marvel) and published as Whiz Comics #2 (February 1940).

In addition to Beck, the line-up of artists who contributed to Fawcett Comics include Al Allard, Harry Anderson, Ken Bald, Phil Bard, Al Bare, Dan Barry, John Belfi, Dave Berg, Jack Binder, Alex Blum, Bob Boyajian, Bob Butts, Al Carreno, Joe Certa, Nat Champlin, Pete Costanza, Greg Duncan, Leonard Frank, Bob Fujitani, Till Goodson, Ray Harford, Bob Hebberd, John Jordan, H. C. Kiefer, Jack Kirby, Andre Le Blanc, Charles Nicholas, Carl Pfeufer, Mac Raboy, Pete Riss, Ed Robbins, John Rosenberger, Kurt Schaffenberger, Joe Simon, Jon Small, Ed Smalle, Jack Sparling, John Spranger, Chic Stone, Charles Sultan, Marc Swayze, Ben Thompson, George Tuska, Bill Ward, Clem Weisbecker, Burt Whitman, Reuben Zubofsky and Nick Zuraw.

The whimsical adventures of Captain Marvel and the Marvel Family (which included Captain Marvel, Jr., Mary Marvel, the Lieutenants Marvel, etc.) eventually outsold those of Superman. National Comics (as DC Comics was then known) sued Fawcett, claiming that the Captain infringed on the copyright of their original costumed superhero. National Comics' 1941 copyright hearing against Fawcett was dismissed on a technicality; the McClure Newspaper Syndicate had failed to include the proper copyright notice on many of the Superman daily newspaper strips. On appeal, however, Judge Learned Hand ruled that this was not an indication of intent to abandon the Superman property, and since it had been revealed that certain Captain Marvel stories were copies of certain Superman stories, National Comics would be able to seek damages for the violation of the copyrights of those specific stories.

Facing a declining comics market, in 1953 Fawcett Comics ceased publication of its superhero titles and settled the ongoing case (the non-comic book divisions of Fawcett continued to publish). Several of Fawcett's completed stories and artwork, as well as a few characters, were sold to Charlton Comics. Fawcett returned to publishing comics in the 1960s, mainly publishing Dennis the Menace and other such titles.

In 1967 Marvel Comics gained the trademark "Captain Marvel" with the publication of an unrelated character's series. In 1972 DC licensed — and in 1994, purchased — Captain Marvel and his related characters. Because of Marvel's trademark, DC has instead used the trademark Shazam! as the title of their Captain Marvel-related comic books and thus the name under which they market and promote the character. In 1973, Shazam and the Marvel family became an additional Earth (to the Pre-Crisis DC continuity), known for a period of time as Earth-S.

== Titles published ==
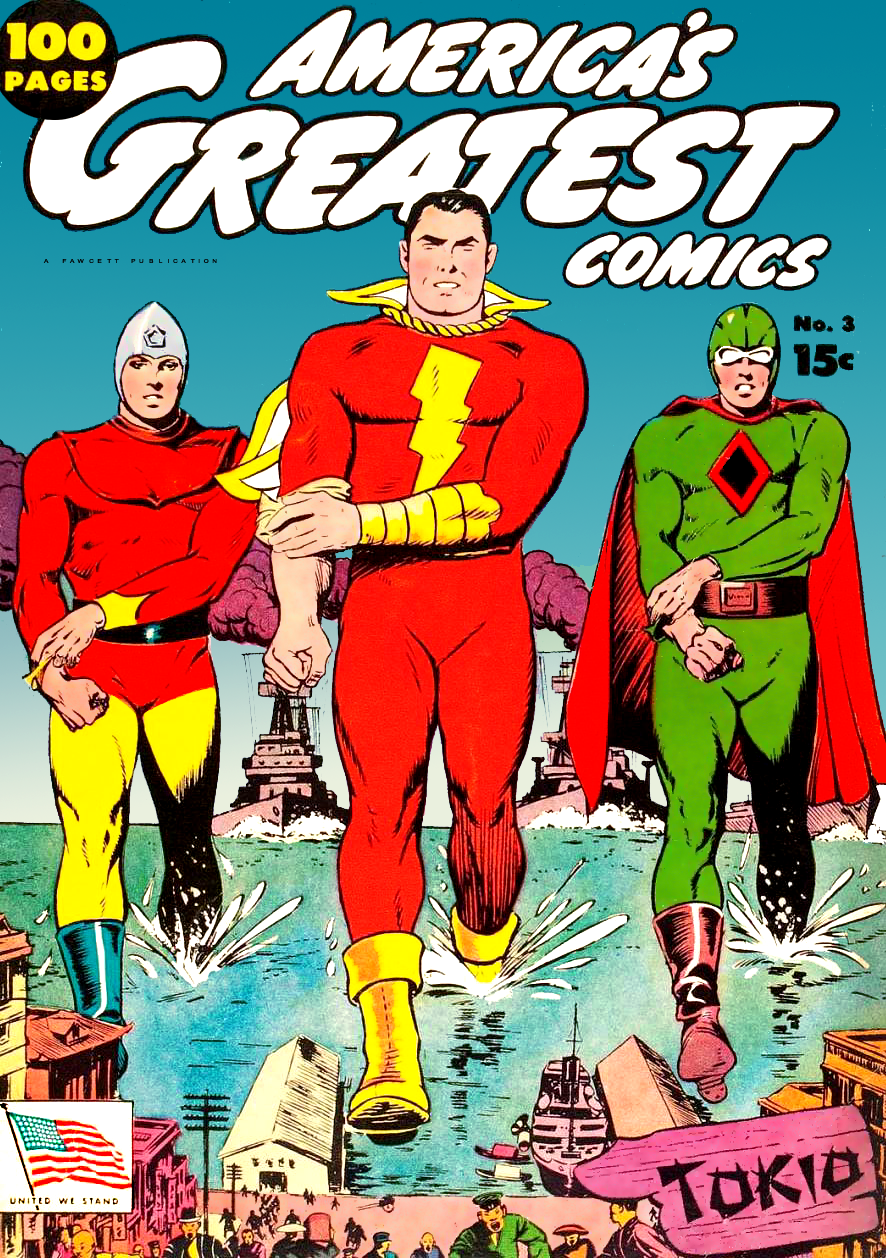
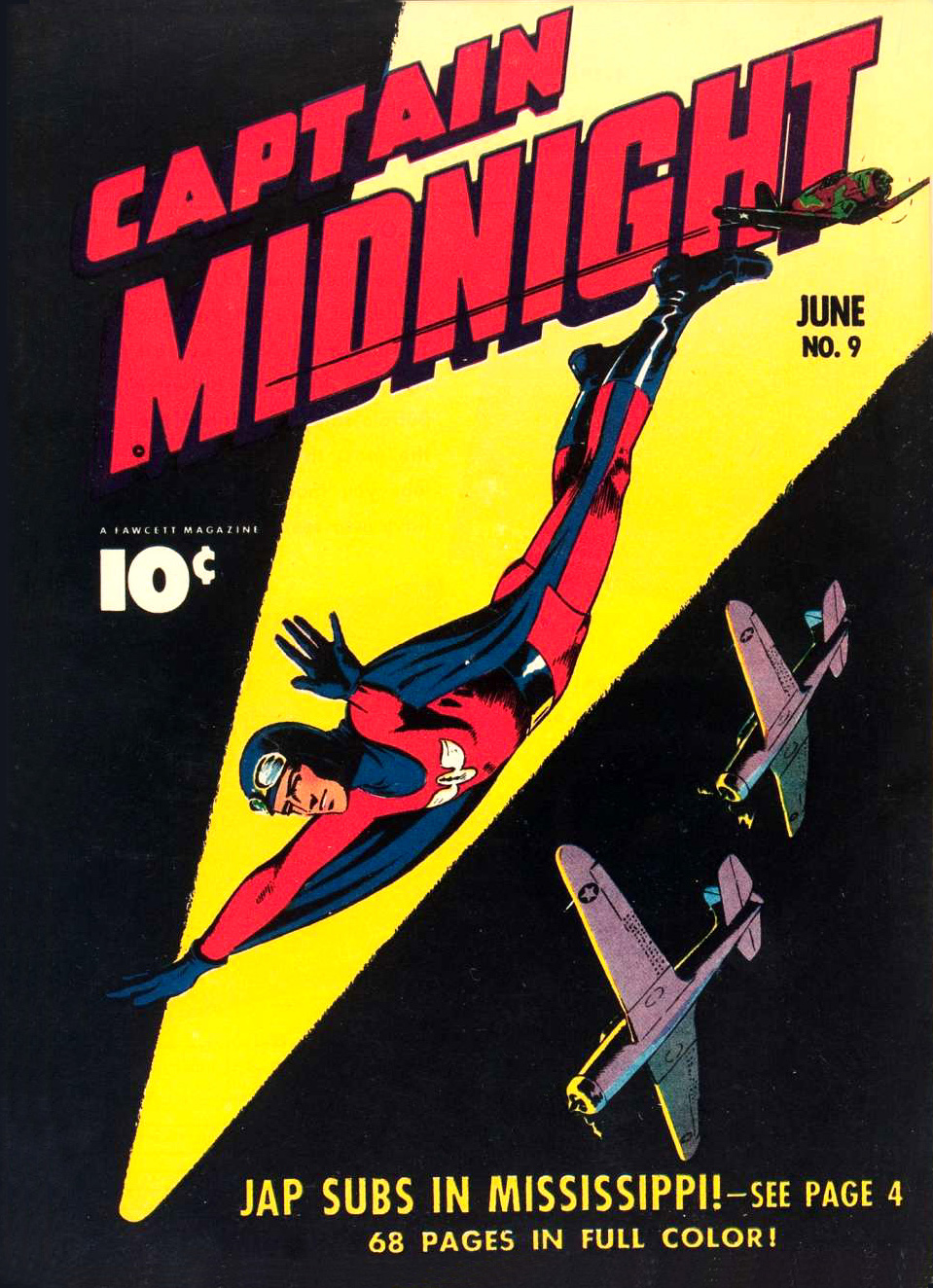
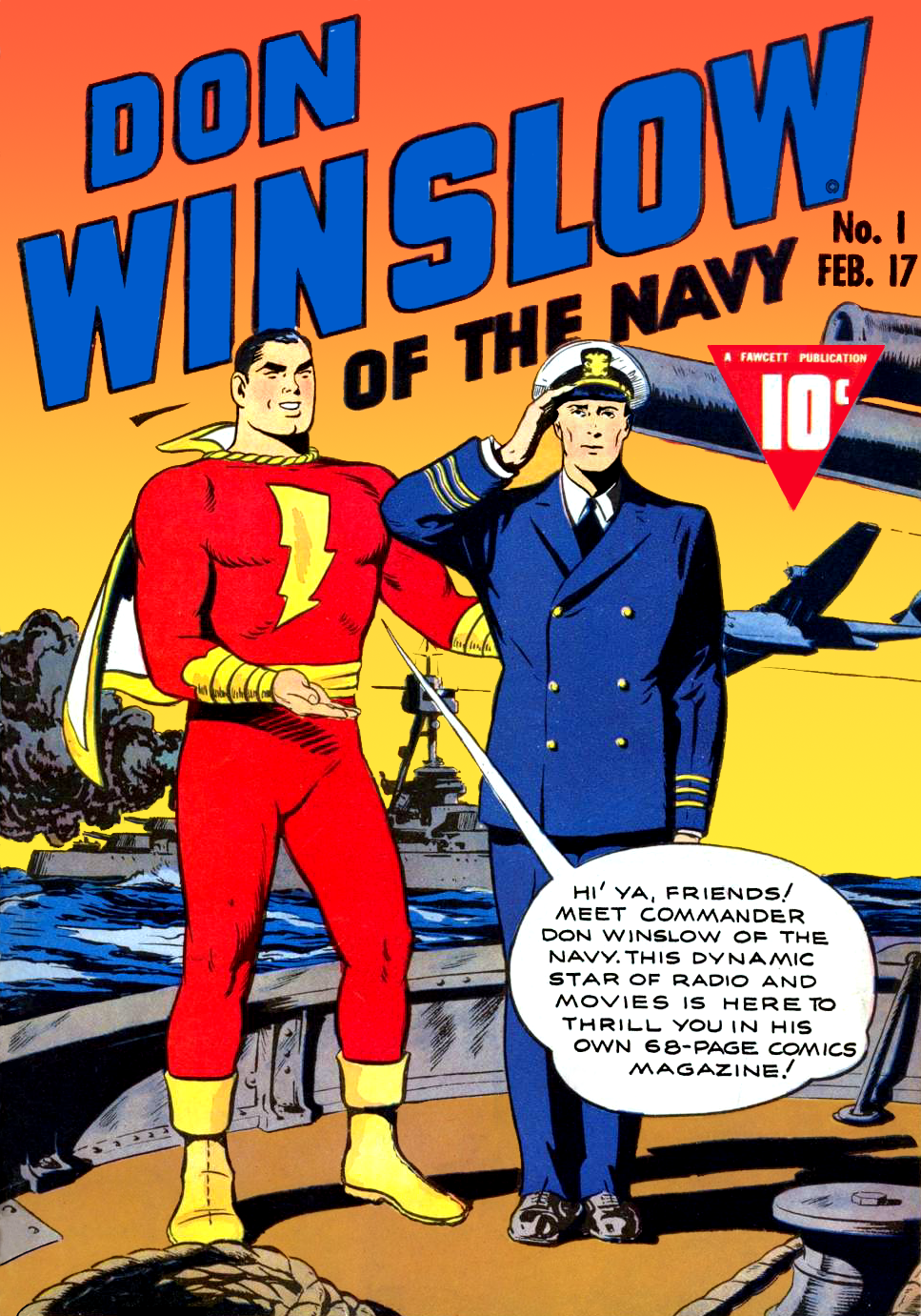
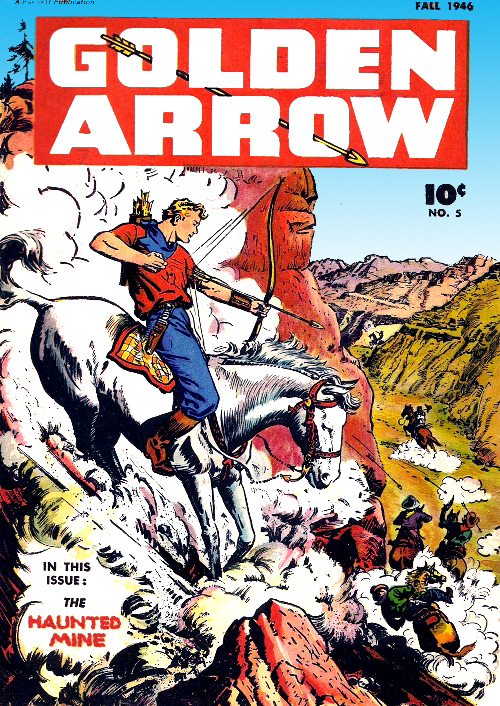
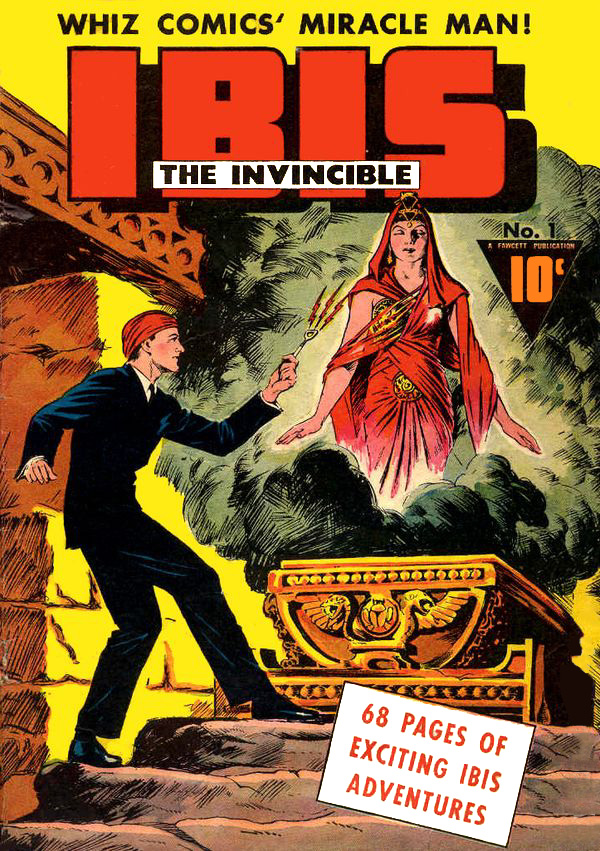
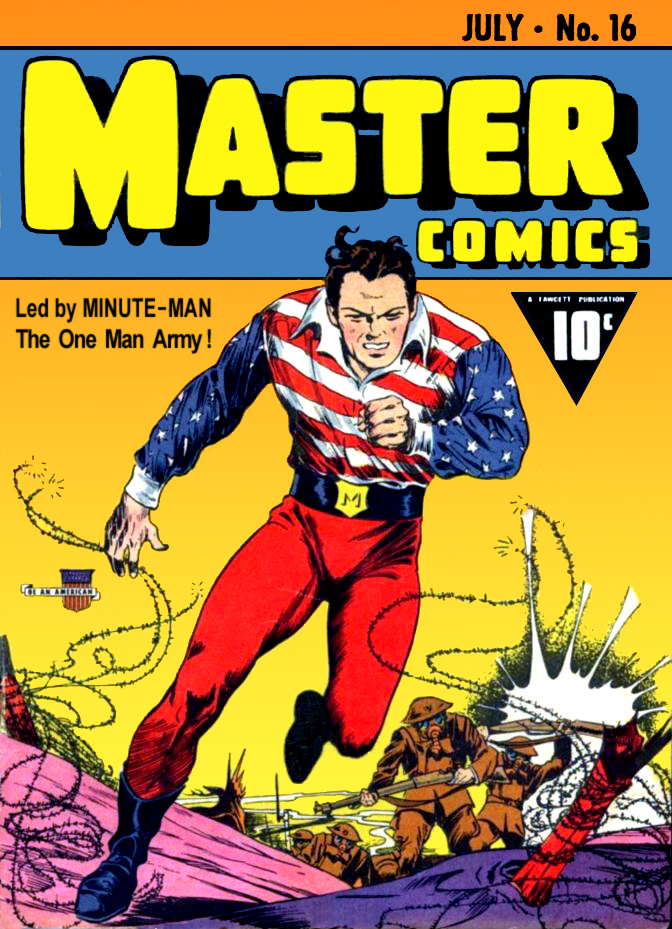
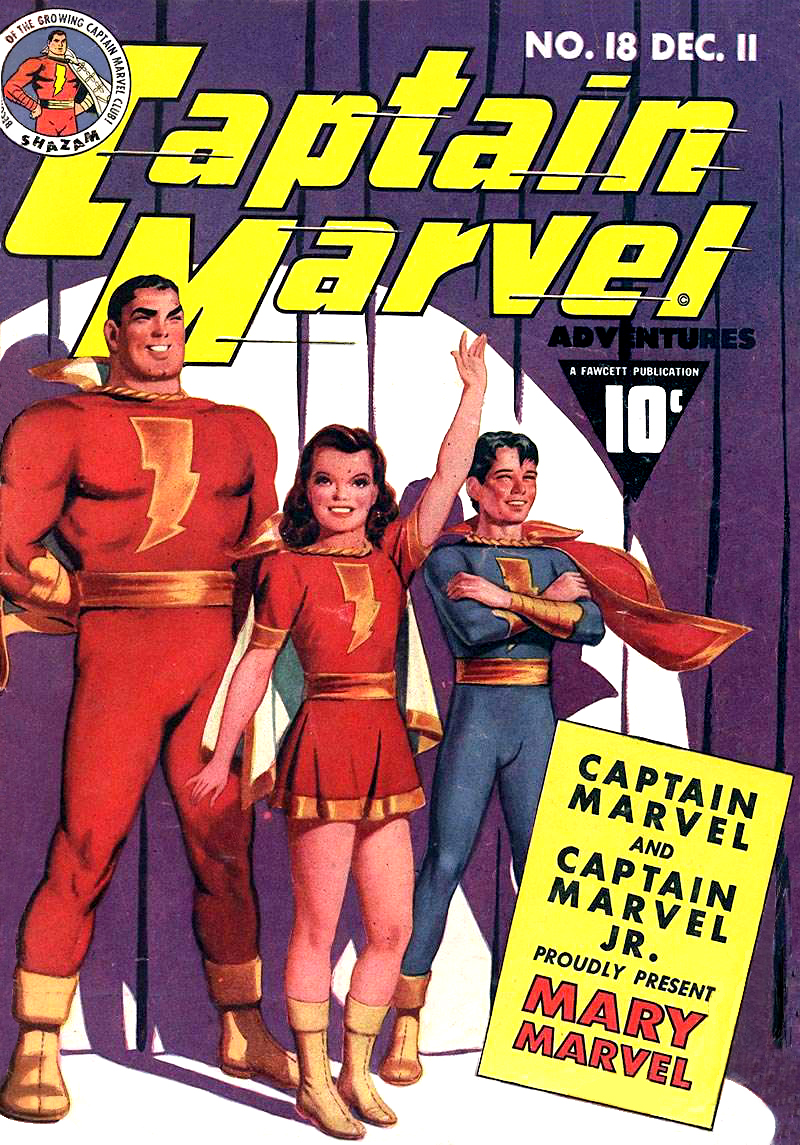
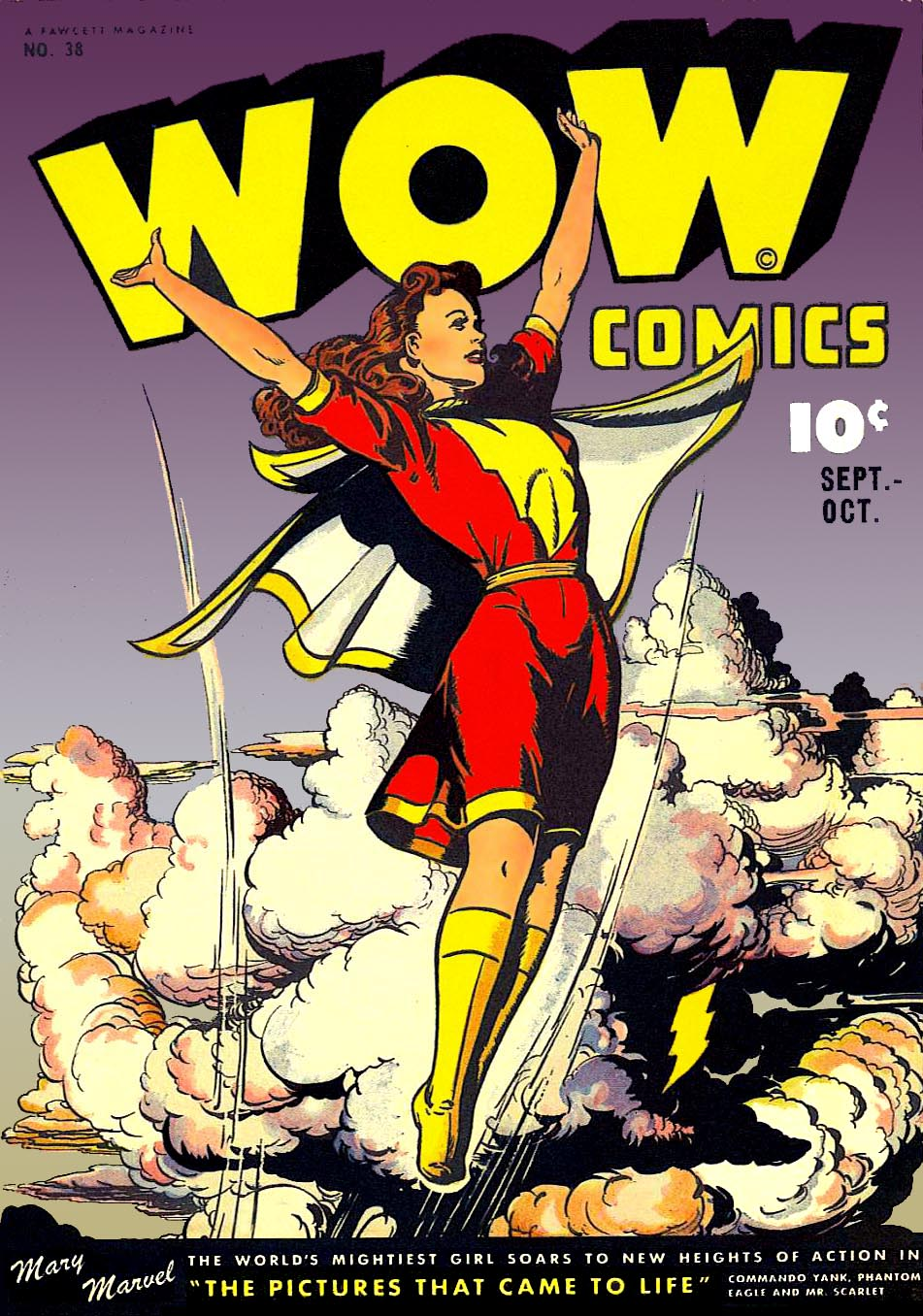
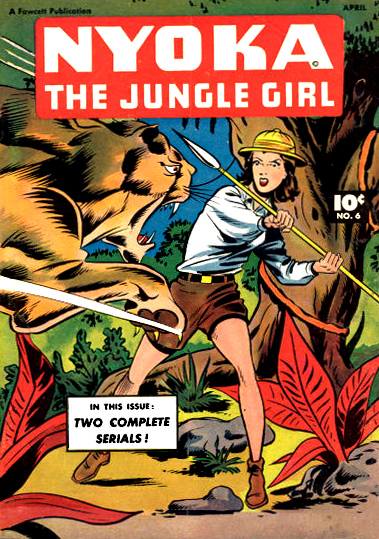
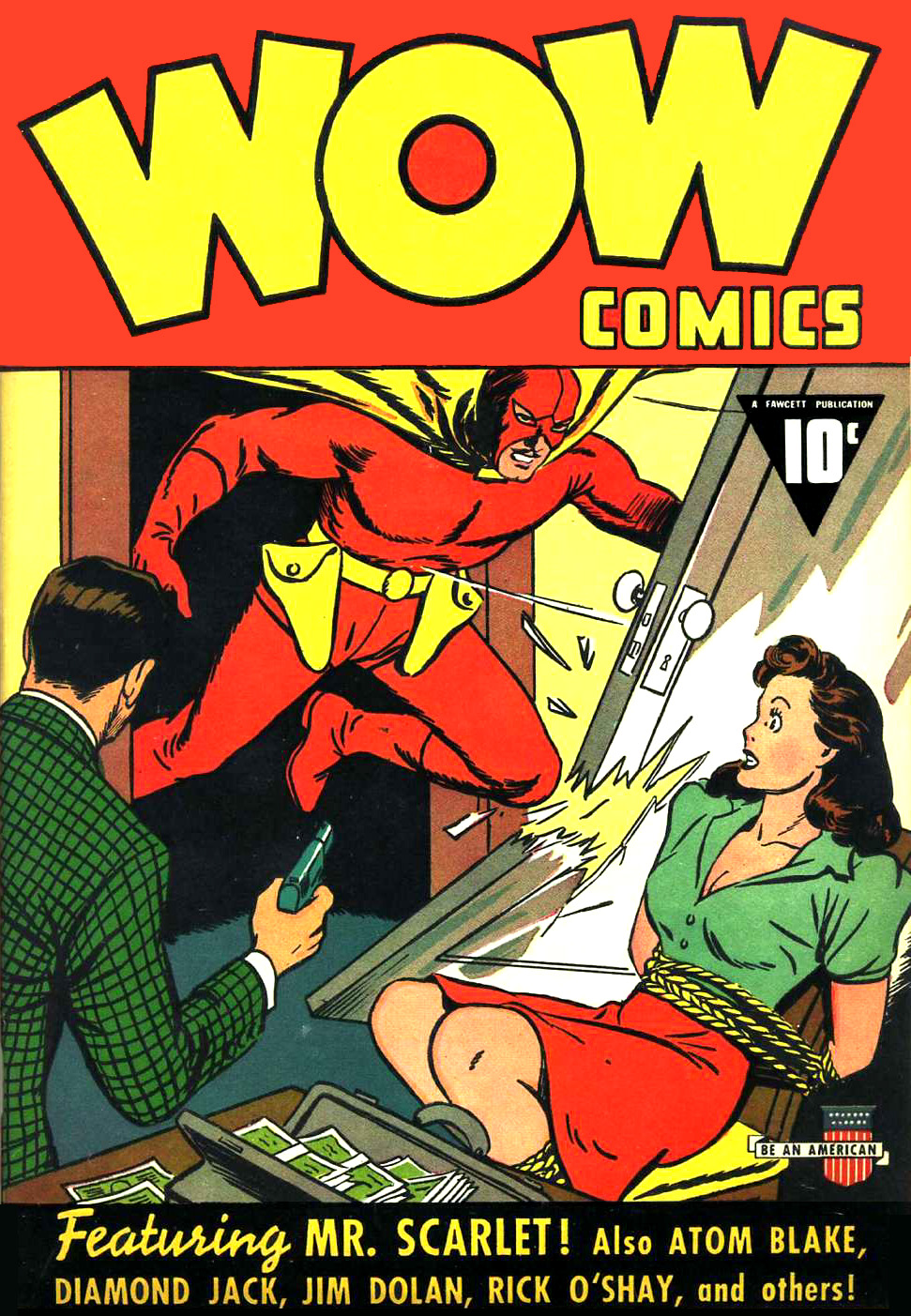
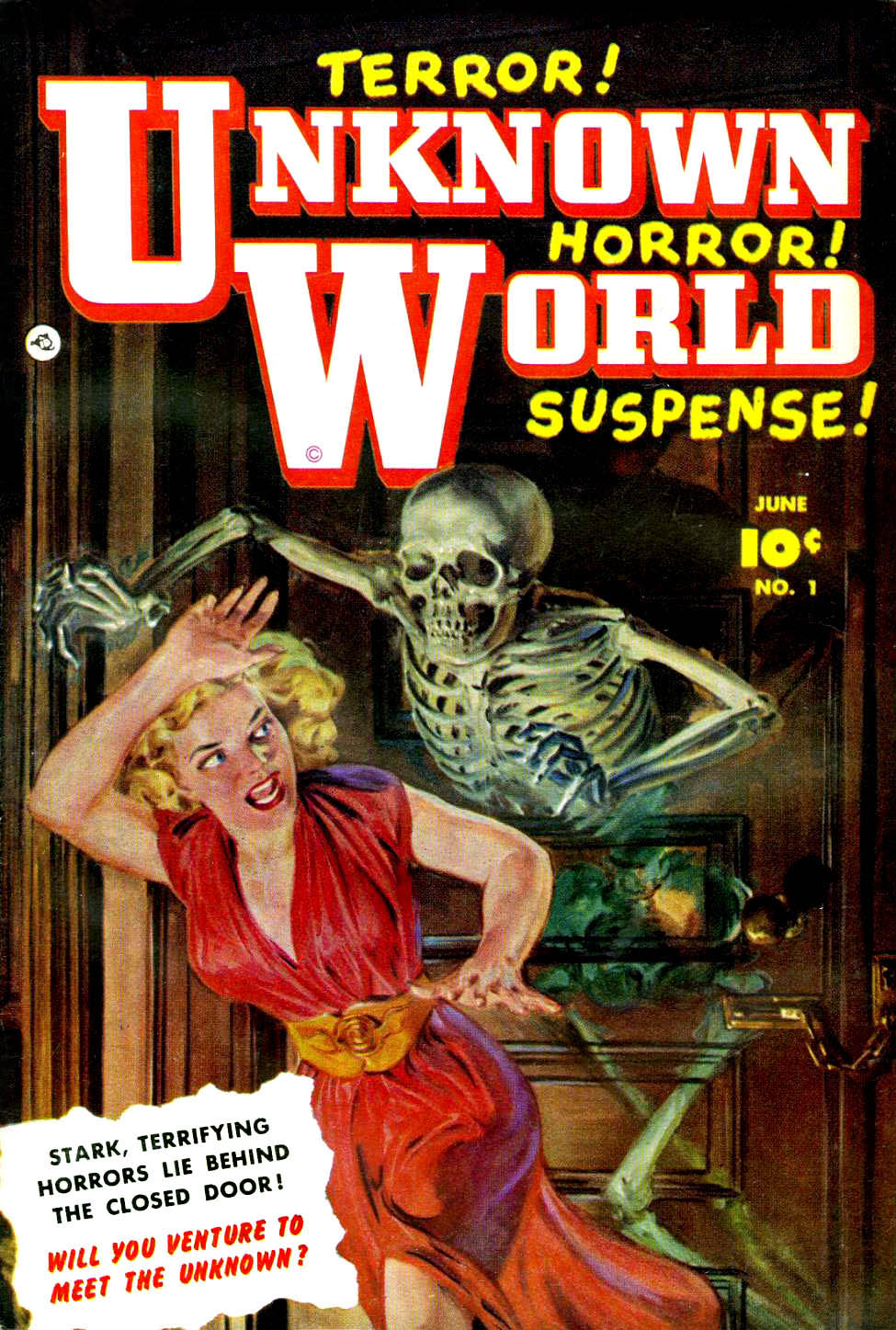
Titles published by Fawcett.
- All-Hero Comics (1 issue, 1943)
- America's Greatest Comics (8 issues, 1941–1943)
- Andy Devine Western (2 issues (1950–1951)
- Animal Fair (11 issues, 1946–1947)
- Battle Stories (11 issues, 1952–1953)
- Beware! Terror Tales (8 issues, 1952–1953)
- Bill Battle, The One Man Army (4 issues, 1952–1953)
- Bill Boyd Western (23 issues, 1950–1952)
- Billy the Kid (3 issues, 1945–1946)
- Bob Colt (10 issues, 1950–1952)
- Bob Steele Western (10 issues, 1950–1952)
- Bob Swift, Boy Sportsman (5 issues, 1951–1952)
- Bulletman (16 issues, 1941–1946)
- Captain Marvel Adventures (150 issues, 1941–1953)
- Captain Marvel Jr. (118 issues, 1942–1953)
- Captain Marvel Story Book (4 issues, 1946–1949)
- Captain Midnight (67 issues, 1942–1948)
- Captain Video (6 issues, 1951)
- Comic Comics (10 issues, 1946–1947)
- Cowboy Love (11 issues, 1949–1951)
- Don Winslow of the Navy (69 issues, 1943–1951) — numbering continued in Charlton Comics series of the same name
- Down with Crime (7 issues, 1951–1952)
- Exciting Romances (12 issues, 1949–1953)
- Fawcett's Funny Animals (83 issues, 1942–1954) — numbering continued in Charlton Comics series Funny Animals
- Gabby Hayes Western (50 issues, 1948–1953) — numbering continued in Charlton Comics series of the same name
- Gene Autry Comics (10 issues, 1941–1943) – numbering continues in Dell Comics series of the same name
- George Pal's Puppetoons (18 issues, 1945–1947)
- Girls in Love (2 issues, 1950)
- Golden Arrow/Golden Arrow Western (6 issues, 1942–1947)
- Hopalong Cassidy (84 issues, 1946–1953) — numbering continued in DC Comics series of the same name
- Hoppy the Marvel Bunny (15 issues, 1945–1947)
- Hot Rod Comics (7 issues, 1951–1953)
- Ibis (6 issues, 1943–1948)
- Jackie Robinson (6 issues, 1949–1952)
- Joe Louis (2 issues, 1950)
- Jungle Girl / Nyoka the Jungle Girl (77 issues, 1945–1953)
- Ken Maynard Western (8 issues, 1950–1952)
- Lance O'Casey (4 issues, 1946–1948)
- Lash Larue Western (46 issues, 1949–1953) — numbering continued in Charlton Comics series of the same name
- Life Story (47 issues, 1949–1953)
- Love Memories (4 issues, 1949–1950)
- Love Mystery (3 issues, 1950)
- The Marvel Family (89 issues, 1945–1954)
- Mary Marvel (28 issues, 1945–1948)
- Master Comics (133 issues, 1940–1953)
- Mike Barnett, Man Against Crime (6 issues, 1951–1952)
- Minute Man (3 issues, 1941–1942)
- Monte Hale Western (54 issues, 1948–1953) — numbering continued in Charlton Comics series of the same name
- Motion Picture Comics (14 issues, 1950–1953)
- Negro Romance (3 issues, 1950)
- Nickel Comics (8 issues, 1940)
- Ozzie and Babs (13 issues, 1947–1949)
- Pinhead and Foodini (4 issues, 1951–1952) – based on the television show Foodini the Great
- Real Western Hero / Western Hero (43 issues, 1948–1952)
- Rocky Lane Western (55 issues, 1949–1953) — numbering continued in Charlton Comics series of the same name
- Rod Cameron Western (20 issues, 1950-1953)
- Romantic Secrets (39 issues, 1959-1953) – series continues in re-numbered Charlton Comics series of the same name
- Romantic Story (22 issues, 1949-1953) – numbering continued in Charlton Comics series of the same name
- Romantic Western (3 issues, 1949-1950)
- Six-Gun Heroes (23 issues, 1950-1953) — numbering continued in Charlton Comics series of the same name
- Slam-Bang Comics (7 issues, 1940)
- Smiley Burnette Western (4 issues, 1950)
- Soldier Comics (11 issues, 1952-1953)
- Spy Smasher (11 issues, 1941-1943)
- Strange Suspense Stories (5 issues, 1952–1953) — continued in Charlton Comics series of the same name
- Suspense Detective (5 issues, 1952-1953)
- Sweetheart Diary (14 issues, 1949-1953) – series continues in re-numbered Charlton Comics series of the same name
- Sweethearts (54 issues, 1948–1953) — numbering continued in Charlton Comics series of the same name
- Tex Ritter Western (20 issues, 1950-1954) — numbering continued in Charlton Comics series of the same name
- This Magazine is Haunted (14 issues, 1951–1953) — numbering continued in Charlton Comics series of the same name
- Tom Mix Western (61 issues, 1948–1953)
- True Confidences (4 issues, 1949-1950)
- True Stories of Romance (3 issues, 1950)
- True Sweetheart Secrets (11 issues, 1950-1953)
- True Tales of Romance (1 issue, 1950)
- Underworld Crime (7 issues, 1952-1953)
- Unknown World / Strange Stories from Another World (5 issues, 1952-1953)
- Whiz Comics (155 issues, 1940–1953)
- Worlds Beyond / Worlds of Fear (10 issues, 1951-1953)
- Wow Comics (69 issues, 1940–1948) - numbering continued in Real Hero Western.
- Xmas Comics (7 issues, 1941-1952)
- Young Eagle (10 issues, 1950-1952) – series continues in re-numbered Charlton Comics series of the same name

=== 1970s iteration ===
- Dennis the Menace and His Friends Series (42 issues, 1970–1980)
- Dennis the Menace Bonus Magazine Series (119 issues, 1970–1979)
- Dennis the Menace Pocket Full of Fun (50 issues, 1969–1980)

=== Fawcett Movie Comic ===
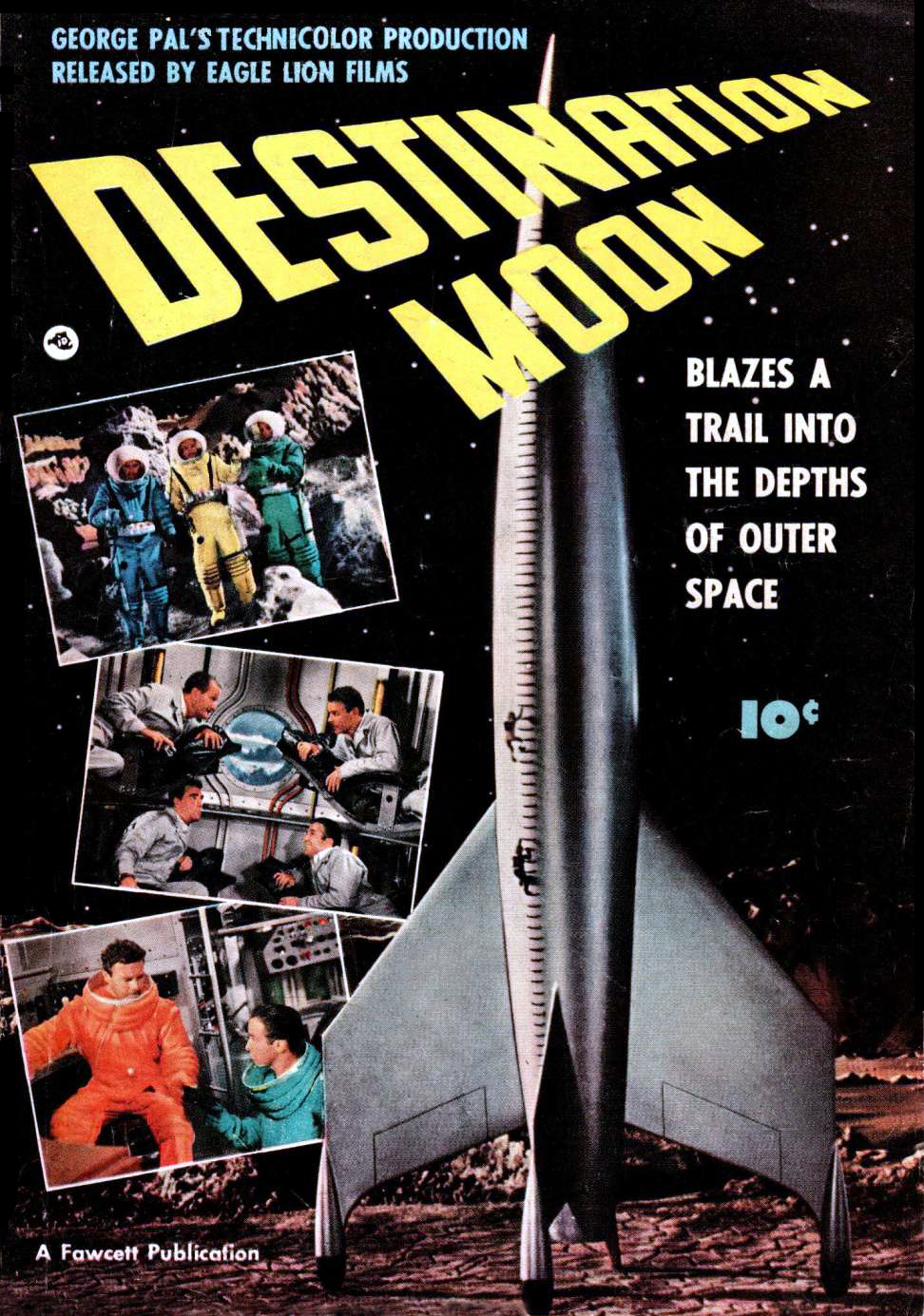
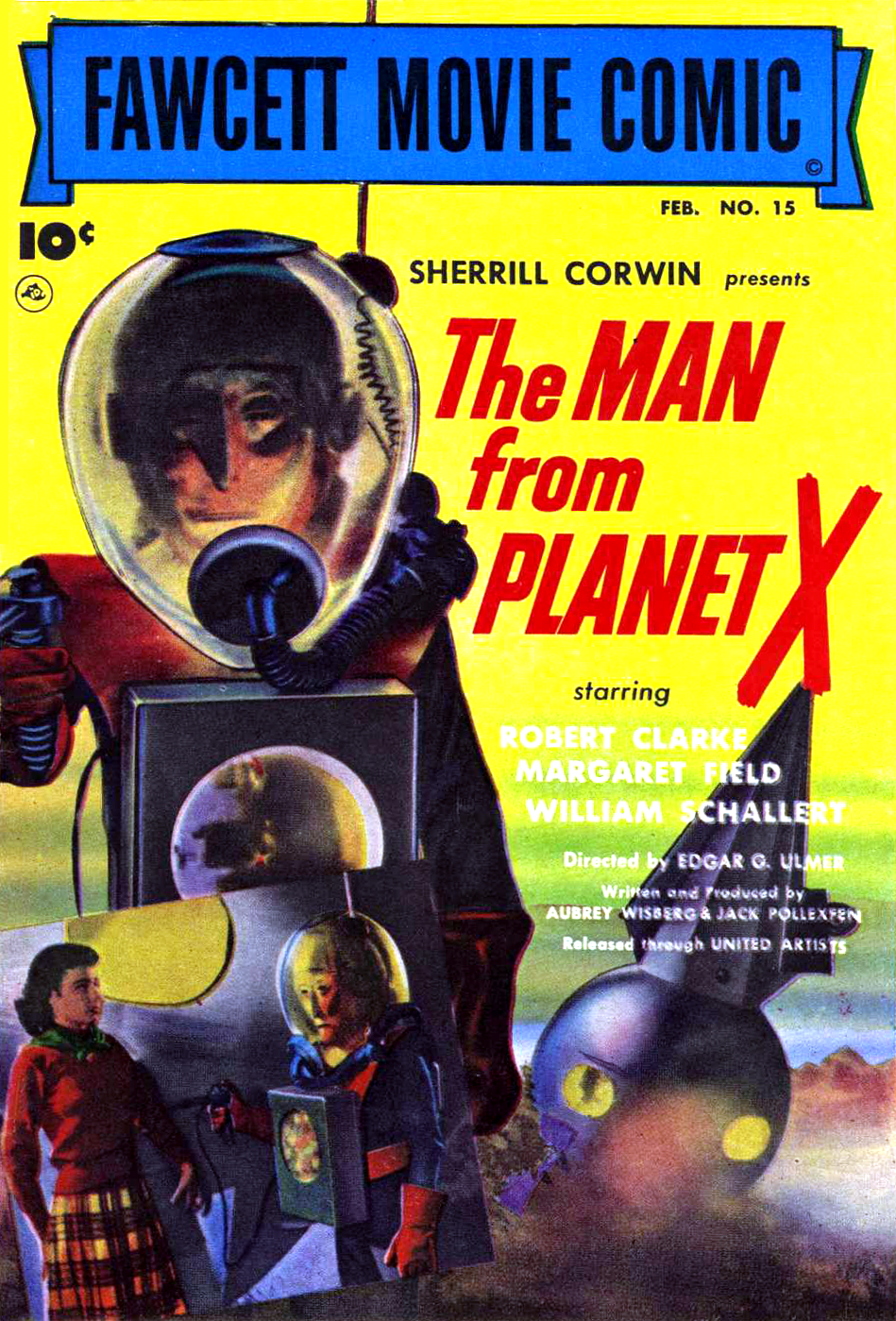
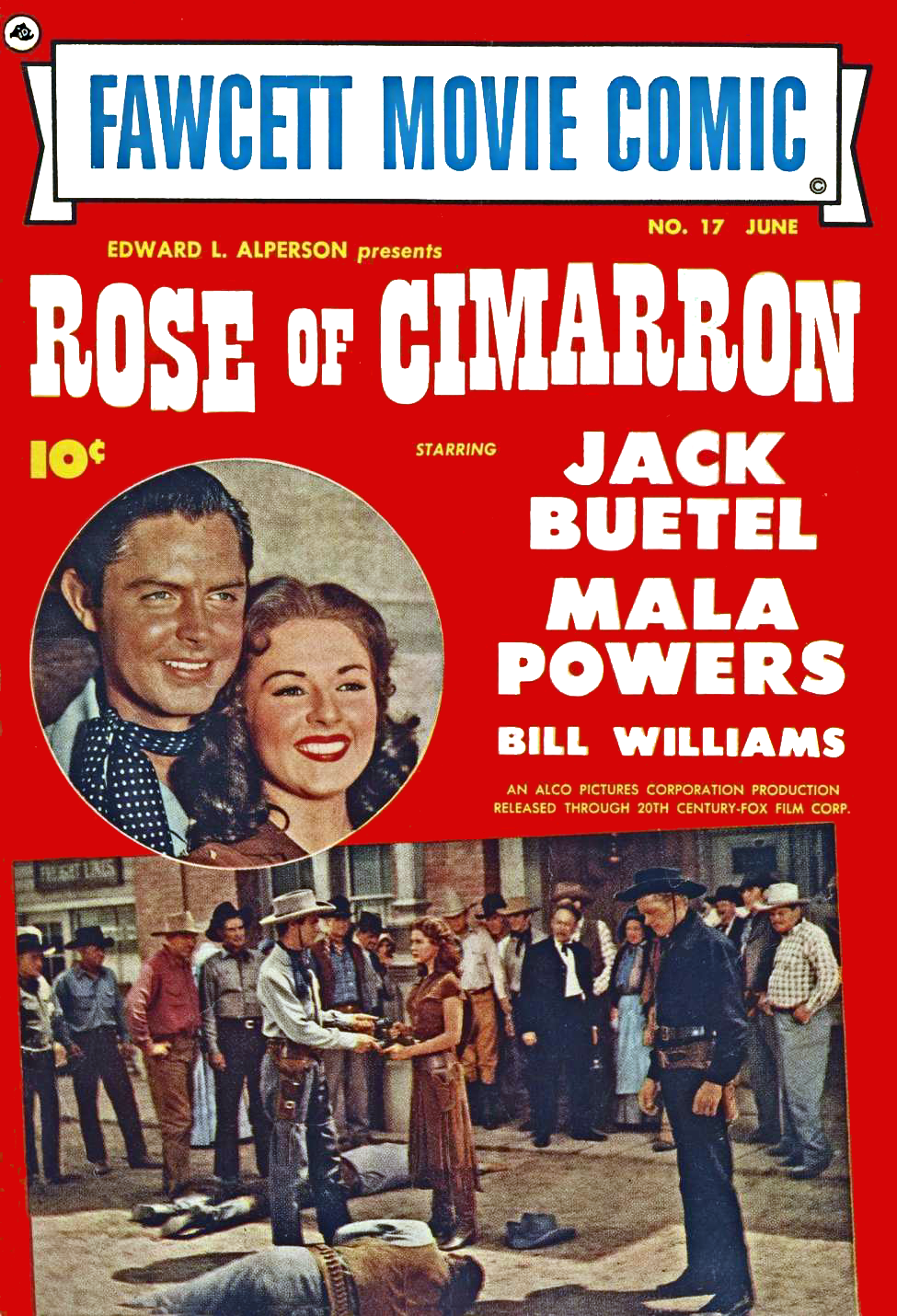
Fawcett Movie Comics.

Fawcett also published several comic book adaptations of Hollywood films under the banner Fawcett Movie Comic. The publications ranged from 1949 to 1952 and were released bi-monthly. Early issues were simply labeled with A Fawcett Publication on the covers with no numbering nor date (other than the copyright year inside). It was not until issue No. 7 (actually the eighth adaptation) that the series started numbering each comic book and using the Fawcett Movie Comic series title. Starting with issue No. 9, the series also printed the month of publication on the covers.

The majority of the comic books were adapted from westerns, with few known exceptions; Ten Tall Men was a French Foreign Legion story taking place in the African desert, The Brigand was a Napoleonic-era swashbuckler and Destination Moon and The Man from Planet X were science fiction space stories.

- Dakota Lil
- Copper Canyon
- Destination Moon (1950)
- Montana
- Pioneer Marshal
- Powder River Rustlers (1949)
- Singing Guns
- No. 7: Gunmen of Abilene (1950)
- No. 8: King of the Bull Whip (December 1950)
- No. 9: The Old Frontier (February 1951)
- No. 10: The Missourians (April 1951)
- No. 11: The Thundering Trail (June 1951)
- No. 12: Rustlers on Horseback (August 1951)
- No. 13: Warpath (October 1951)
- No. 14: The Last Outpost (December 1951)
- No. 15: The Man from Planet X (February 1952)
- No. 16: Ten Tall Men (April 1952)
- No. 17: Rose of Cimarron (June 1952)
- No. 18: The Brigand (August 1952)
- No. 19: Carbine Williams (October 1952)
- No. 20: Ivanhoe (December 1952)

== See also ==
- National Comics Publications, Inc. v. Fawcett Publications, Inc.
