= Countdown (disambiguation) =

A countdown is the backward counting to indicate the remaining time before an event occurs.

Countdown may also refer to:

== Arts, entertainment, and media ==
=== Comics ===
- Countdown (Polystyle Publications), a British comic book series
  - Countdown (comic strip), the title strip in the series
- Countdown to Final Crisis, an American comic book series published by DC comics
- Countdown to Infinite Crisis, an American one-shot comic book published by DC Comics
- Star Trek: Countdown, a comic book prequel to the 2009 film Star Trek

=== Films ===
- Countdown (1967 film), directed by Robert Altman
- Countdown (2004 film), a Russian action film directed by Yevgeny Lavrentyev
- Countdown (2011 film), a South Korean film directed by Huh Jong-Ho
- Countdown (2012 film), a Thai film
- Countdown (2016 film), an American action film
- Countdown (2019 film), an American horror film

=== Games and toys ===
- Countdown (G.I. Joe), a fictional astronaut
- Countdown (video game), a 1990 point-and-click adventure game
- Countdown, a Holiday Beanie Babies teddy bear

=== Literature ===
- Countdown (novel), a 2014 book by Natalie Standiford in The 39 Clues franchise
- Countdown (novel series), a 1999 young adult series by Daniel Parker
- Countdown, a non-fiction book by Amitav Ghosh

=== Music ===
- Countdown, another name for The Countdown Singers

==== Albums ====
- Countdown (Jimmy McGriff album), a 1983 album by jazz organist Jimmy McGriff
- Countdown (Steve Kuhn album), a 1998 album by jazz pianist Steve Kuhn
- Countdown (Super Junior-D&E album), a 2021 album by Super Junior-D&E
- Countdown 1992–1983, a compilation album by the band Pulp
- The Countdown, a 1988 album by jazz pianist Mulgrew Miller
- Countdown, a 2016 album by Joey Alexander
- Countdown, an album by Marie Wegener released in 2019

==== Songs ====
- "Countdown" (Beyoncé song)
- "Countdown" (Lindsey Buckingham song)
- "Countdown" (Hardwell and MAKJ song)
- "Countdown" (Hyde song)
- "Countdown" (Pulp song)
- "Countdown" (Rush song)
- "Countdown" (John Coltrane song), 1960
- "Count Down", a song on Rock 'n' Roll Circus by Ayumi Hamasaki
- "Countdown", a song on The Big Come Up by The Black Keys
- "Countdown", a song on I Wanna Thank Me by Snoop Dogg
- "Countdown", a song on Victorious 2.0: More Music from the Hit TV Show by Leon Thomas III and Victoria Justice
- "Countdown", a song on Kiss of Life by Kiss of Life member Belle

=== Television ===
==== Programs ====
- Countdown (American TV series), a 2025 crime drama television for Amazon Prime Video
- Countdown (Armenian TV series), a 2017 Armenian thriller television series aired on Armenia Premium
- Countdown (Australian TV program), a 1974–1987 Australian music television program broadcast by ABC
- Countdown (Canadian TV program), a 1996–2017 Canadian music television program broadcast by MuchMusic
- Countdown (Dutch TV program), a 1978–1994 Dutch music television program broadcast by Veronica
- Countdown (game show), a British television game show broadcast on Channel 4 since 1982
- Countdown, a television program on Bloomberg TV Philippines
- Countdown – Die Jagd beginnt (Countdown – The hunt begins), a German television series
- Countdown with Keith Olbermann, an American television news program
- Countdown with Mike Duffy, a television news program hosted by Mike Duffy (born 1946)
- Count Down TV, a Japanese late-night music television program

==== Episodes ====
- Countdown (3 Body Problem)
- "Countdown" (FlashForward), 2010
- "Countdown" (Haven), 2013
- "Countdown" (Star Trek: Enterprise), 2004
- "Countdown" (Twenty Twelve), 2011
- "Countdown", an episode of the French animated television series Code Lyoko: Evolution, 2013
- "Countdown", an episode of the American television series MacGyver, 1986
- "The Countdown" (The Amazing World of Gumball), 2015
- "The Countdown" (The O.C.), 2003

== Other uses ==
- Countdown (supermarket), in New Zealand
- NASCAR Countdown, a pre-race television show
- NBA Countdown, a pre-game television show
- Countdown, the physical film leader on which a countdown is printed
- Countdown, a sans serif typeface with "space age" connotations
- Countdown, a Tech character in Skylanders: Swap Force
- Palestine Square Countdown Clock, digital clock located in Tehran's Palestine Square, Iran
- Passenger information systems, at railway stations

== See also ==
- Countdown to Armageddon (disambiguation)
- Countdown to Doomsday (disambiguation)
- DC Countdown (disambiguation)
- The Final Countdown (disambiguation)
