= Edward Herrmann on screen and stage =

Edward Herrmann was an American actor of the stage and screen.

He was most known for his performances as Franklin D. Roosevelt in the limited series Eleanor and Franklin (1976), and Eleanor and Franklin: The White House Years (1977) and as Richard Gilmore in Amy Sherman-Palladino's comedy-drama series Gilmore Girls (2000–2007).

Herrmann started his career working in theatre on Broadway in 1972 with his debut in Moonchildren alongside James Woods. He received two Tony Award nominations winning for Best Featured Actor in a Play for his performance in Mrs. Warren's Profession in 1976. For his work on television, Herrmann received five Primetime Emmy Award nominations winning for his performance in The Practice in 1999. He also received a Screen Actors Guild Award nomination with the ensemble for Oliver Stone's Nixon (1995). Herrmann became known as a character actor having appeared in various films such as Warren Beatty's Reds (1981), Woody Allen's The Purple Rose of Cairo (1985), Garry Marshall's Overboard (1987), Martin Scorsese's The Aviator (2004) and Chris Rock's I Think I Love My Wife (2007). He is also known for his guest performances in television M*A*S*H, Law & Order, and The Good Wife.

== Filmography ==
=== Film ===
Year	Title	Role	Notes
1971	Lady Liberty	Policeman	Uncredited
1973	The Paper Chase	Thomas Craig Anderson	
1973	The Day of the Dolphin	Mike	
1974	The Great Gatsby	Klipspringer	
1975	The Great Waldo Pepper	Ezra Stiles	
1978	The Betsy	Dan Weyman	
1978	Brass Target	Colonel Walter Gilchrist	
1979	Take Down	Ed Branish	
1979	The North Avenue Irregulars	Reverend Michael Hill	
1981	Harry's War	Harry Johnson	
1981	Reds	Max Eastman	
1982	Death Valley	Paul Stanton	
1982	A Little Sex	Tommy Donovan	
1982	Annie	President Franklin D. Roosevelt	
1984	Mrs. Soffel	Warden Peter Soffel	
1985	The Purple Rose of Cairo	Henry	
1985	The Man with One Red Shoe	Brown	
1985	Compromising Positions	Bob Singer	
1987	The Lost Boys	Max	
1987	Overboard	Grant Stayton III	
1988	Big Business	Graham Sherbourne	
1992	Hero	Mr. Broadman	Uncredited
1993	Born Yesterday	Ed Devery	
1993	My Boyfriend's Back	Mr. Dingle	
1994	Foreign Student	Zachary "Zach" Gilmore	
1994	Richie Rich	Richard Rich Sr.	
1995	Nixon	Nelson Rockefeller	
1997	Critical Care	Robert Payne	
1998	Better Living	Jack	
1999	Walking Across Egypt	Reverend Vernon	
2001	Double Take	Charles Allsworth	
2001	Down	Matthew Milligan	
2001	The Cat's Meow	William Randolph Hearst	
2002	The Emperor's Club	Headmaster Woodbridge	
2003	Intolerable Cruelty	Rex Rexroth	
2004	Welcome to Mooseport	Avery Hightower	Uncredited
2004	Bereft	Lloyd	
2004	The Aviator	Joseph Breen	
2005	Ape to Man	The Narrator	Documentary
2006	Relative Strangers	Doug Clayton	
2006	Wedding Daze	Lyle	
2006	Factory Girl	James Townsend	
2007	I Think I Love My Wife	Mr. Landis	
2009	The Skeptic	Dr. Shepard	
2009	The Six Wives of Henry Lefay	Goodenough	
2010	The Surge: The Untold Story	The Narrator	Documentary short
2011	Son of Morning	Thomas	
2011	Bucky Larson: Born to Be a Star	Jeremiah Larson	
2011	Redemption: For Robbing the Dead	Governor Dawson	
2012	Price Check	Jack Bennington	
2012	Treasure Buddies	Philip Wellington	
2012	Christmas Oranges	Mr. Crampton	
2012	Heaven's Door	Nate Christensen	
2012	Enduring Legacy	Charles Francis Adams	Voice, Short
2013	Are You Here	Dr. Vincent	
2013	The Wolf of Wall Street	Stratton Oakmont Commercial	Voice
2014	The Town That Dreaded Sundown	Reverend Joe Cartwright	
2015	Coach of the Year	Bill Ford	Released posthumously

=== Television ===
Year	Title	Role	Notes
1975	Beacon Hill	Richard Palmer	11 episodes
1975	Valley Forge	Folsom	Television film
1976	Eleanor and Franklin	Franklin D. Roosevelt (age 20–50)	TV miniseries; 2 episodes
1977	Eleanor and Franklin: The White House Years	Franklin D. Roosevelt (age 20–50)	Television film
1977	A Love Affair: The Eleanor and Lou Gehrig Story	Lou Gehrig	Television film
1979	Portrait of a Stripper	Frank Andrews	Television film
1979	Freedom Road	Stephen Holms	Television film
1979	3 by Cheever	Kip Lawton	TV miniseries 2 episodes
1980	M*A*S*H	Captain Steven J. Newsome	Episode: "Heal Thyself"
1981	The Private History of a Campaign That Failed	The Stranger	Television film
1981	Dear Liar	George Bernard Shaw	Television film
1982	The Electric Grandmother	Father	Television film
1982	The Gift of Life	Dr. Quinn	Television film
1983	Freedom to Speak	Reader	TV miniseries; 4 episodes
1983	Memorial Day	Ned Larwin	Television film
1984–1986	St. Elsewhere	Father Joseph McCabe	4 episodes
1984–1991	American Playhouse	Alger Hiss; English Professor	Episodes: "Concealed Enemies" (4) "The End of a Sentence"
1986	Murrow	Fred Friendly	Television film
1987–1989	The Lawrenceville Stories	The Headmaster	TV miniseries; 3 episodes
1987	Alfred Hitchcock Presents	Dr. Maxwell Stoddard / Litton	Episode: "The Mole"
1988	Hothouse	Woods	Episode: "The Actress"
1990	So Proudly We Hail	James Wagner	Television film
1991	The General Motors Playwrights Theater	Ben Cunningham	Episode: "The Last Act Is a Solo"
1991	Sweet Poison	Henry	Television film
1991	Fire in the Dark	Robert	Television film
1993	A Foreign Field	Ralph	Television film
1994	Don't Drink the Water	Mr. Kilroy	Television film
1995	The Face on the Milk Carton	Frank Jessmon	Television film
1995	Here Come the Munsters	Herman Munster	Television film
1995	Wings	Y.M. Burg	Episode: "So Long, Frank Lloyd Wrong"
1995–2009	Law & Order	Drew Seely; Mr. Mosbeck; Frederic Matson	3 episodes
1996	Soul of the Game	Branch Rickey	Television film
1996	A Season in Purgatory	Dr. Shugrue	TV miniseries; 2 episodes
1996	What Love Sees	Morton Treadway	Television film
1996	Homicide: Life on the Street	Thomas Pandolfi	Episode: "M.E., Myself and I"
1996	Doomsday Virus	President	TV miniseries; 2 episodes
1997–2001	The Practice	Anderson Pearson	10 episodes
1997	Biography	The Narrator	Episode: "F. Scott Fitzgerald: The Great American Dreamer"
1997	Liberty! The American Revolution	The Narrator	TV miniseries; 6 episodes
1997	The Fifties	The Narrator	TV miniseries documentary; 7 episodes
1998	Frank Lloyd Wright	The Narrator	Documentary television film
1998	Saint Maybe	Doug Bedloe	Television film
1998–2000	Nova	The Narrator	Documentary series 7 episodes
1999	Atomic Train	President Fellwick	TV miniseries; 2 episodes
1999	Vendetta	District Attorney Luzenberg	Television film
1999	The Korean War: Fire and Ice	The Narrator	TV miniseries documentary
1999	Niagara: A History of the Falls	The Narrator	Documentary television film
1999–2002	Save Our History	Host / The Narrator	Documentary series; 4 episodes
1999–2005	History's Lost & Found	The Narrator	Documentary series; 65 episodes
2000	Horror in the East	The Narrator	Documentary television film
2000	Battle History of the U.S. Navy	The Narrator	TV miniseries documentary; 4 episodes
2000	Founding Fathers	The Narrator	TV miniseries documentary; 4 episodes
2000–2003	Oz	Harrison Beecher	6 episodes
2000–2007	Gilmore Girls	Richard Gilmore	86 episodes
2001	James Dean	Raymond Massey	Television film
2001	In Search of Christmas	Host / The Narrator	Television film
2002	Antarctica: A Frozen History	The Narrator	Documentary television film
2002	Founding Brothers	The Narrator	Documentary television film
2002	First Mothers	The Narrator	Documentary television film
2002	The World Trade Center: Rise and Fall of an American Icon	The Narrator	Documentary television film
2002	Rise and Fall of the Spartans	The Narrator	TV miniseries; 4 episodes
2003	The Louisiana Purchase	The Narrator	Documentary television film
2003	Crossing Jordan	Captain Thomas Malden	Episode: "Pandora's Trunk: Part 2"
2003	Teddy Roosevelt: An American Lion	The Narrator	Documentary television film
2003	Modern Marvels	The Narrator	Documentary series Episode: "4x4"
2003	Mavericks, Miracles and Medicine	The Narrator	TV miniseries documentary 4 episodes
2003	Russia, Land of the Tsars	The Narrator	TV miniseries documentary 4 episodes
2003	Nostradamus: 500 Years Later	The Narrator	Documentary television film
2003	The Day They Died	The Narrator	Documentary television film
2003	The Samurai	The Narrator	Documentary television film
2003	Stalin: Man of Steel	The Narrator	Documentary television film
2004	Isaac's Storm	The Narrator	Documentary television film
2004	First Invasion: The War of 1812	The Narrator	Documentary television film
2004	Countdown to Armageddon	The Narrator	Documentary television film
2005	Beyond the Da Vinci Code	The Narrator	Documentary television film
2005	The Presidents	The Narrator	Documentary series 8 episodes
2005	The French Revolution	The Narrator	Documentary television film
2005	FDR: A Presidency Revealed	The Narrator	Documentary television film
2005	Giganto: The Real King Kong	The Narrator	Documentary television film
2005	Decoding the Past	The Narrator	Episode: "Mysteries of the Bermuda Triangle"
2005	Tom Goes to the Mayor	Benjamin Kaplan (voice)	Episode: "Porcelain Birds"
2005	The Templar Code: Crusade of Secrecy	The Narrator	Documentary television film
2005	UFO Files	The Narrator	Episode: "Beyond the War of the Worlds"
2005	Bible Battles	The Narrator	Television special documentary
2006	The Ten Commandments	The Narrator	TV miniseries 2 episodes
2006	Titanic's Final Moments: Missing Pieces	The Narrator	Documentary television film
2006	Violent Earth: New England's Killer Hurricane	The Narrator	Documentary television film
2006	Mayan Doomsday Prophecy	The Narrator	Documentary television film
2006	Desperate Crossing: The True Story of the Mayflower	The Narrator	Documentary television film
2006	Eighty Acres of Hell	The Narrator	Documentary television film
2007	Banned from the Bible II	The Narrator	Documentary television film
2007	The States	The Narrator	10 episodes
2007	Titanic's Achilles Heel	The Narrator	Documentary television film
2007	The Revolution	The Narrator	Documentary series 4 episodes
2007	Columbus: The Lost Voyage	The Narrator	Documentary television film
2007	Grey's Anatomy	Dr. Norman Shales	3 episodes
2007	Andrew Jackson	The Narrator	Documentary television film
2007	How the Earth Was Made	The Narrator	Documentary television special
2008	30 Rock	Walter	Episode: "210"
2009	Hatching Pete	Principal Fred Daly	Television film
2010	Hold at All Costs: The Story of the Battle of Outpost Harry	The Narrator	Documentary television film
2010–2013	The Good Wife	Lionel Deerfield	6 episodes
2011	Better with You	Judge	Episode: "Better with the Baby"
2011	A Christmas Wish	Les McCallum	Television film
2011	Drop Dead Diva	Reverend Phillips	Episode: "Ah, Men"
2011	The Christmas Pageant	Garrett Clark	Television film
2011	Wonder Woman	Senator Warren	Unaired television pilot
2012	Harry's Law	Judge Lester Babcock	3 episodes
2012–2016	American Dad!	Old Man / Councilman	Voice; 2 episodes
2013	CSI: Crime Scene Investigation	Mr. Vogel	Episode: "In Vino Veritas"
2013	How I Met Your Mother	Reverend Lowell	Episode: "Knight Vision"
2014	Black Box	Dr. Reynaud	2 episodes
2014	The Roosevelts: An Intimate History	Franklin D. Roosevelt (voice)	7 episodes
2015	Perception	Jack Pierce	Episode: "Brainstorm"
2015	Cancer: The Emperor of All Maladies	The Narrator	3 episodes

== Theatre ==
Year	Title	Role	Venue	Ref.
1972	Moonchildren	Performer	Royale Theatre, Broadway	
1976	Mrs. Warren's Profession	Frank Gardner	Vivian Beaumont Theater, Broadway	
1980	The Philadelphia Story	Macaulay Connor	Vivian Beaumont Theater, Broadway	
1983	Plenty	Raymond Brock	Plymouth Theatre, Broadway	
1988	A Walk in the Woods	John Honeyman	Comedy Theatre, West End	
1989	Love Letters	Andrew Makepiece Ladd II	Edison Theatre, Broadway	
1997	Psychopathia Sexualis	Dr. Block	Manhattan Theatre Club, Off-Broadway	
1998	The Deep Blue Sea	William Collyer	Criterion Center Stage, Broadway	

== Video games ==
Year	Title	Role	Notes
2004	Men of Valor	Narrator	
