= Thomas F. Madden =

American historian

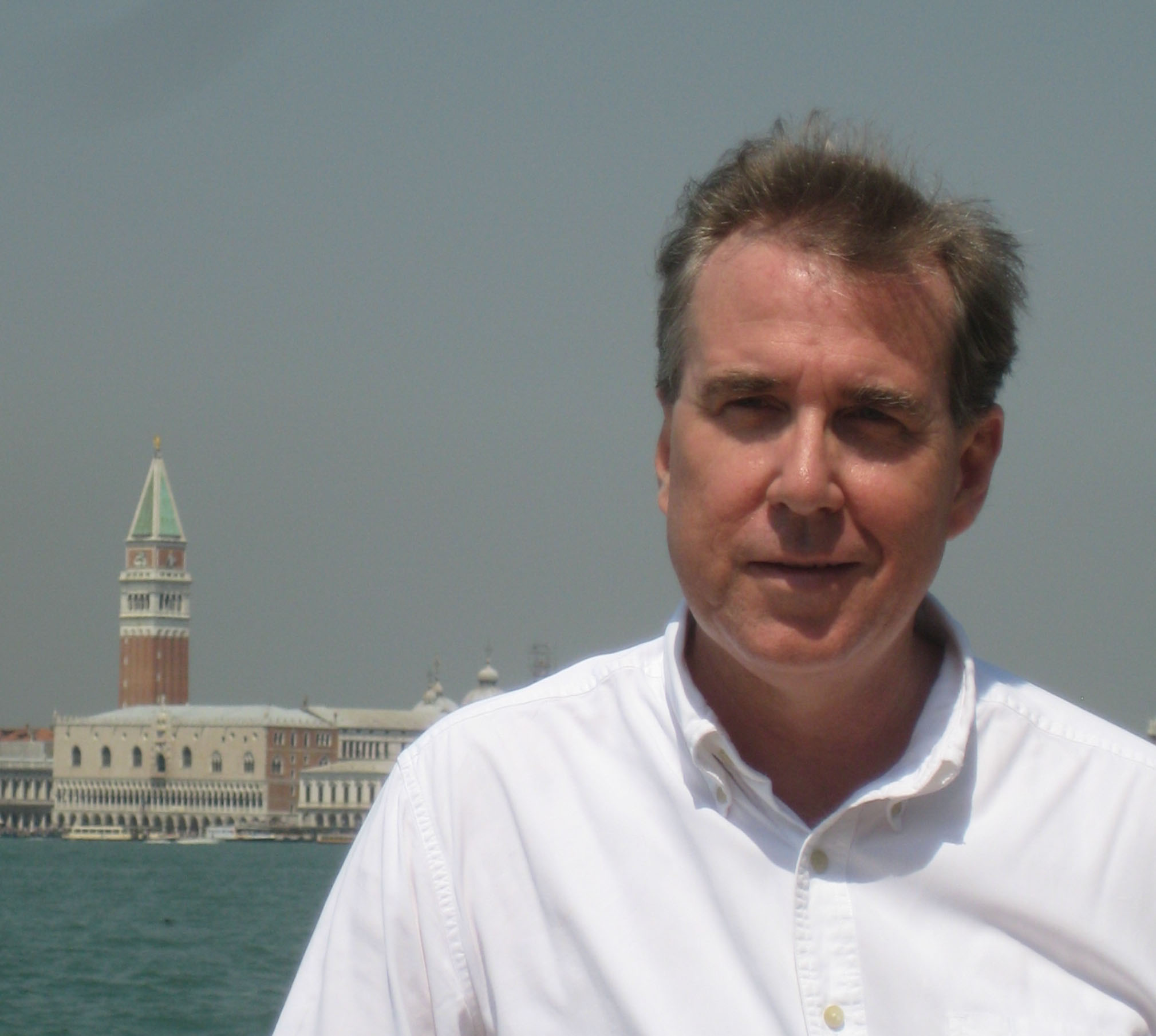
- Madden in 2012
- Born: 10 June 1960 (age 66); Phoenix, Arizona, U.S.
- Education: University of New Mexico (BA); University of Illinois (MA, PhD)
- Occupation: Historian
- Employer: Saint Louis University
- Title: Professor of History, Director of the Center for Medieval and Renaissance Studies, SLU
- Awards: National Endowment for the Humanities Public Scholar, John Simon Guggenheim Foundation Fellow, Medieval Academy of America Haskins Medal
- Website: http://www.thomasmadden.org

Thomas Francis Madden (born 10 June 1960) is an American historian, a former chair of the history department at Saint Louis University in St. Louis, Missouri, and director of Saint Louis University's Center for Medieval and Renaissance Studies.

A specialist on the Crusades, he has often commented in the popular media after the events of September 11, to discuss topics such as how Muslims have viewed the medieval Crusades and their parallels to today's interventions in the Middle East. In 2007, he was awarded the Haskins Medal from the Medieval Academy of America for his book Enrico Dandolo and the Rise of Venice, also a "Book of the Month" selection by the BBC History magazine. In 2012, he was named a Fellow of the John Simon Guggenheim Memorial Foundation. In 2018, he was named a National Endowment for the Humanities Public Scholar.

== Biography ==
Madden received his bachelor's degree from the University of New Mexico in 1986, and his Masters (1990) and PhD (1993) degrees in history from the University of Illinois.

Madden is active in the Society for the Study of the Crusades in the Latin East, and organizes panels for the Annual Symposium on Medieval and Renaissance Studies in Saint Louis, Missouri. He is the Director of the Crusades Studies Forum and the Medieval Italy Prosopographical Database Project, both housed at Saint Louis University.

== Writing ==
Madden has books and articles including the "Crusades" entry for the Encyclopædia Britannica. His research specialties are ancient and medieval history, including the Fourth Crusade, as well as ancient and medieval Italian history. His 1997 revision of The Fourth Crusade: The Conquest of Constantinople (originally authored by Donald Queller) was a selection of the History Book Club. He is also known for speaking about the ways that the history of the Crusades is often used for manipulation of modern political agendas. His book, The New Concise History of the Crusades has been translated into seven foreign languages.

His book Enrico Dandolo and the Rise of Venice won multiple awards, including the 2007 Haskins Medal from the Medieval Academy of America and the Otto Gründler Prize from the Medieval Institute. According to the Medieval Review, with this book "Madden more than ever stakes out his place as one of the most important medievalists in America at present."

His 2008 book, Empires of Trust, was a comparative study that sought elements in historic republics that led to the development of empires. In the cases of Rome and the United States, he argued that their citizens and leaders acquired a level of trust among allies and potential enemies that was based upon an unusual rejection of hegemonic power.

His book, Venice: A New History was the culmination of decades of work in the archives and libraries of Venice and is critically acclaimed for its particular focus on the historic development of its economy and political role. Likewise, his book, Istanbul: City of Majesty at the Crossroads of the World also received positive acclaim and remains a prominent source of information about the city.

His most recent book, The Fall of Republics: A History from Ancient Carthage to the American Constitution, examines the flaws in ancient and medieval republics and how the American Founders employed those lessons when crafting their own new government.

=== Books ===
- The Fall of Republics: A History from Ancient Carthage to the American Constitution, 2026, Princeton University Press LCCN 2025-950289 ISBN 9780691195827
- Istanbul: City of Majesty at the Crossroads of the World, 2016, Viking LCCN 2016-44048 ISBN 9780670016600; 2017 pbk edition. Penguin Books. 22 November 2016. ISBN 9780143129691.
- Venice: A New History, 2012, Viking LCCN 2012-5304 ISBN 9780670025428
- as editor: Crusades: Medieval Worlds in Conflict, 2010, Ashgate LCCN 2010-21524 ISBN 9781409400615
- Empires of Trust, 2008, Dutton/Penguin ISBN 9780525950745
- as editor: The Fourth Crusade: Event, Aftermath, and Perceptions, 2008, Ashgate LCCN 2007-16269 ISBN 9780754663195
- Crusades: The Illustrated History, 2005, University of Michigan Press LCCN 2004-304592 ISBN 0472114638
- Enrico Dandolo and the Rise of Venice, 2003, Johns Hopkins University Press LCCN 2002-13623 ISBN 0801873177
- as editor: The Crusades: The Essential Readings, 2002, Blackwell LCCN 2002-20872 ISBN 063123022X
- A Concise History of the Crusades, 1999, Rowman & Littlefield LCCN 99-27012
  - The New Concise History of the Crusades, 2005, updated edition; LCCN 2005-27720 ISBN 0742538222
  - The Concise History of the Crusades, 2014, 3rd edition; ISBN 978-1-4422-1574-0
- as editor with Ellen E. Kittell: Medieval and Renaissance Venice, 1999, University of Illinois Press LCCN 98-58020
- The Fourth Crusade: The Conquest of Constantinople, co-author with Donald Queller, 1997, University of Pennsylvania Press, 2nd revised edition LCCN 96-39139

=== Select popular articles ===
- "Abolishing the Senate Has Been Tried Before", Wall Street Journal, September 2, 2026.
- "Looking for Europe's Future in an Overlooked Corner of the Continent", New York Times, May 31, 2022.
- "Hagia Sophia: Past and Future", First Things, July 17, 2020.
- "In Defense of King Louis IX", First Things, July 7, 2020.
- "The Woman Who Smashed a Glass Ceiling the 16th Century", New York Times, November 22, 2017.
- The Islamic State's Members Believe They are Fighting a New Crusade. They're Wrong.", Washington Post, December 4, 2015.
- "The Pope Joins a Fine but Rarely Seen Tradition", Wall Street Journal, February 14, 2013.
- "The Real History of the Crusades", ARMA, March 19, 2011 (updated 2005 piece)
- "America's Days Aren't Numbered", The Wall Street Journal, July 4, 2008.
- "Not Dead Yet: The Lost Tomb of Jesus – One Year Later", NRO, March 21, 2008.
- "Unreasonable Response: Benedict XVI Hasn't Revived the Crusades", NRO, September 18, 2006.
- "Crusaders and Historians", First Things, June/July 2005.
- "Onward P.C. Soldiers: Ridley Scott's Kingdom of Heaven, NRO, May 27, 2005.
- "The Real Inquisition: Investigating the Popular Myth,", NRO, June 18, 2004.
- 'Crusade Myths', The Catholic Dossier, January/February 2002.

=== Select scholarly articles ===
- "The Venetian Version of the Fourth Crusade: Memory and the Conquest of Constantinople in Medieval Venice," Speculum 87 (2012): 311–44.
- "The Latin Empire of Constantinople's Fractured Foundation: The Rift Between Boniface of Montferrat and Baldwin of Flanders," in The Fourth Crusade: Event, Aftermath, and Perceptions (Brookfield: Ashgate Publishing, 2008): 45–52.
- "Food and the Fourth Crusade: A New Approach to the 'Diversion Question,'" in Logistics of Warfare in the Age of the Crusades, John H. Pryor, ed. (Brookfield: Ashgate Publishing, 2006): 209–28.
- "Venice, the Papacy, and the Crusades before 1204," in The Medieval Crusade, Susan J. Ridyard, ed. (Woodbridge: Boydell and Brewer, 2004): 85–95.
- "The Enduring Myths of the Fourth Crusade," World History Bulletin 20 (2004): 11–14.
- "The Chrysobull of Alexius I Comnenus to the Venetians: The Date and the Debate," Journal of Medieval History 28 (2002): 23–41.
- "Venice's Hostage Crisis: Diplomatic Efforts to Secure Peace with Byzantium between 1171 and 1184," in Ellen E. Kittell and Thomas F. Madden, eds., Medieval and Renaissance Venice (Urbana: University of Illinois Press, 1999): 96–108.
- "Outside and Inside the Fourth Crusade," The International History Review 17 (1995): 726–43.
- "Venice and Constantinople in 1171 and 1172: Enrico Dandolo's Attitude towards Byzantium," Mediterranean Historical Review 8 (1993): 166–85.
- "Vows and Contracts in the Fourth Crusade: The Treaty of Zara and the Attack on Constantinople in 1204," The International History Review 15 (1993): 441–68.
- "Father of the Bride: Fathers, Daughters, and Dowries in Late Medieval and Early Renaissance Venice," Renaissance Quarterly 46 (1993): 685–711. (with Donald E. Queller)
- "The Fires of the Fourth Crusade in Constantinople, 1203–1204: A Damage Assessment," Byzantinische Zeitschrift 84/85 (1992): 72–93.
- "The Serpent Column of Delphi in Constantinople: Placement, Purposes, and Mutilations," Byzantine and Modern Greek Studies 16 (1992): 111–45.

=== Recorded lectures ===
- Medieval Mysteries: The History Behind the Myths of the Middle Ages
- Lost Warriors of God: The History of the Knights Templar
- The Medieval World I: Kingdoms, Empires, and War
- The Medieval World II: Society, Economy, and Culture
- A History of Venice: Queen of the Seas
- "God Wills It!" Understanding the Crusades
- The Decline and Fall of Rome
- From Jesus to Christianity: The History of the Early Church
- Upon This Rock: A History of the Papacy from Peter to John Paul II
- Empire of Gold: A History of the Byzantine Empire
- One, Holy, Catholic, and Apostolic: A History of the Church in the Middle Ages
- Christianity at the Crossroads: The Reformations of the Sixteenth and Seventeenth Centuries
- Heaven or Heresy: A History of the Inquisition
- The Catholic Church in the Modern Age

=== History Channel documentaries ===
- Decoding the Past, "Spear of Christ"
- Decoding the Past, "Secrets of the Koran"
- The Big Build, "The Castle Tower"

== Awards ==
- 2005 Otto Grundler Prize, Medieval Institute
- 2007 Haskins Medal, Medieval Academy of America, for the book Enrico Dandolo and the Rise of Venice
- 2012 Guggenheim Fellowship
- 2013 Fellow of the Medieval Academy of America
- 2015 American Council of Learned Societies, Fellow
- 2018 National Endowment for the Humanities, Public Scholar Award
