= Countdown to Armageddon =

Countdown to Armageddon may refer to:

- Countdown to Armageddon, a History Channel documentary film narrated by Edward Herrmann
- Countdown to Armageddon, a 2005 two-part episode of Decoding the Past
- "Countdown to Armageddon", the opening track from the album It Takes a Nation of Millions to Hold Us Back by Public Enemy
- Countdown to Armageddon (DC Heroes), a 1986 role-playing game adventure
