= Just Imagine =

Just Imagine may refer to:

- Just Imagine (film), 1930 science fiction musical film
- Just Imagine..., 2001–2002 comic book line
