= Wildstar (disambiguation) =

WildStar is a 2014 MMORPG developed by Carbine Studios.

Wildstar or WildStar may also refer to:

- WildStar (Image Comics), an Image Comics comic book series
- Wildstar (DC Comics), a superheroine in comic books published by DC Comics
- Wildstar Records, a record label
- "Wildstar" (song), a song on the Giorgio Moroder album Déjà Vu
- Wild Star Yamaha XV1600A, motorcycle
- Derek Wildstar, a character from the animated feature Star Blazers
