= Al Gordon =

American writer (born 1953)

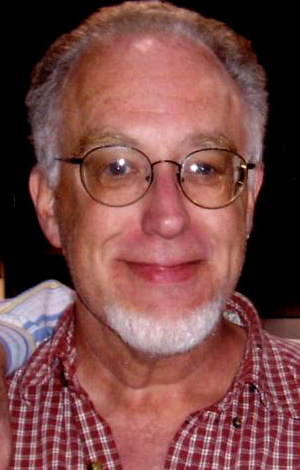
- Gordon in 2007
- Born: Alan Gordon; June 22, 1953 (age 73) San Francisco, California, U.S.
- Areas: Writer, Inker
- Notable works: Fantastic Four; Justice League of America; Legion of Super-Heroes; WildStar
- Awards: Eisner Award (2000)

Alan Gordon (born June 22, 1953) is an American comic book creator primarily known as an inker and writer. He is best known for his 1990s work on DC Comics' Legion of Super Heroes and the Justice League of America, Marvel Comics' Fantastic Four, and Image Comics' creator-owned WildStar. He is not to be confused with another Al Gordon who illustrated comics in the 1950s.

== Biography ==
=== Early life and career ===
Pencils by Jack Kirby. Inks by Al Gordon. Colors by John Heebink

Gordon was born in San Francisco, California, on June 22, 1953. Gordon's career began in the mid-1970s as inker of the story "A Christmas Carol", starring Michael T. Gilbert's talking animal detective the Wraith, in Quack #6 (Dec. 1977), from the early independent comics publisher Star Reach. The following year, Gordon began freelance inking for Marvel Comics, working with pencilers Bob Budiansky and Steve Leialoha, respectively, on a backup story each in Captain America #220-221 (April–May 1978). He was the regular inker on Spider-Woman, with penciler Carmine Infantino from #7-16 (Oct. 1978 - July 1979), and worked as well on at least one issue each of The Avengers, Ghost Rider, Iron Man, Marvel Premiere, Marvel Team-Up, Marvel Two-in-One, Master of Kung Fu, Power Man and Iron Fist, The Spectacular Spider-Man, Thor Annual and "What If..." through 1982.

=== 1980-1990s ===
In 1982, Gordon left Marvel for DC Comics to ink writer-penciler-co-creator Scott Shaw and fill-in penciler Stan Goldberg on the series Captain Carrot and His Amazing Zoo Crew!. In 1983, Gordon did a year-and-a-half run at the independent Eclipse Comics, inking Will Meugniot on Will and Mark Evanier's The DNAgents, as well as inking Rick Hoberg for the company's spin-off series Surge and its anthology Eclipse Monthly.

Afterward, he returned to Marvel to become the regular inker on the company's flagship series Fantastic Four, and on the science-fiction adventure limited series Rocket Raccoon (with Mike Mignola penciling). Other work around this time includes issues of The Eternals and Power Pack, and Marvel's licensed series ThunderCats and Transformers.

Freelancing once again for DC, Gordon in 1987 began inking Kevin Maguire while working with plotter/thumbnail artist Keith Giffen on Justice League International. Two years later, Gordon, this time inking Giffen, also began cowriting with Giffen and Tom and Mary Bierbaum for DC's revamped Legion of Super Heroes. Gordon took over complete writing and scripting for issues #21 though 24 (Aug. 1991), while continuing to ink Giffen.

In 1992 he began WildStar with Jerry Ordway for Image Comics. The WildStar: Sky Zero miniseries was written, inked, edited (with the help of Billy "Bud" Shakespeare) and produced by Gordon with pencils by Jerry Ordway. A continuing WildStar series followed with penciler Chris Marrinan.

Other late 1980s and 1990s work includes issues of Marvel's Sensational She-Hulk and Silver Surfer and a run over penciler Erik Larsen on The Amazing Spider-Man; DC's Valor and Timber Wolf (the latter of which he also wrote and thumbnailed); Hero Comics' Champions; Awesome Entertainment's "Supreme" series and Judgment Day Alpha both written by Alan Moore; Tom Strong written by Alan Moore for DC's imprint America's Best Comics; Image Comics' Freak Force and others.

=== 2000s-2010s ===
He continued his working relationship with Ordway, inking Marvel's The Avengers vol. 2. Other 2000s work for Marvel includes Captain Marvel #25 (Sept. 2004) and Marvel Holiday Special #1 (Jan. 2006).

Red Sonja ala Nagle/Mucha/Peter Max - Electric Nouveau. Art by Al Gordon

== Other media ==
Outside of comics, Gordon has also done commercial and advertising art, fashion illustration, advertising and commercial voice overs including audiobooks, and played in rock bands.

== Awards ==
Gordon has received two Eisner Awards and several Eisner Award and Harvey Award nominations:

Awards

- Eisner Award for Best Serialized Story 2000 - Tom Strong #4–7 (ABC Comics), by Alan Moore, Chris Sprouse, Al Gordon, and guest artists
- Eisner Award for Best Single Issue 2000 - Tom Strong #1 (ABC Comics): "How Tom Strong Got Started," by Alan Moore, Chris Sprouse, and Al Gordon

Nominations

- Harvey Award for Best Inker 1988 - Justice League International #1, DC Comics
- Harvey Award for Best New Series 1988 - Justice League International, by Keith Giffen, J. M. DeMatteis, Kevin Maguire and Al Gordon, DC Comics
- Eisner Award for Best Art Team 1988 - Kevin Maguire and Al Gordon, for Justice League International #1, DC Comics
- Harvey Award for Best Inker 2000 - Tom Strong, ABC Comics (Tom Strong also nominated for Best New Series 2000 and Best Continuing or Limited Series 2000)
- Harvey Award for Best Inker 2001 - Tom Strong, ABC Comics

== Bibliography ==
=== Inker ===
- New Men (Image Comics) (1996)
- Alan Moore's Awesome Universe Handbook (1999)
- The Amazing Spider-Man (1963)
- Ambush Bug: Nothing Special (1992)
- America's Best Comics (2004)
- America's Best Comics Preview (1999)
- America's Best Comics Primer (2008)
- America's Best Comics Special (2001)
- Avengers Assemble (2004)
- The Avengers(1963)
- The Avengers (1998)
- Back Issue (2003)
- Brigade (1993)
- Captain America (1968)
- Captain America (1998)
- Captain Carrot and His Amazing Zoo Crew! (1982)
- Captain Carrot and the Final Ark (2007)
- Captain Marvel (2002)
- Comics Feature (1980)
- Countdown (2000)
- Cover Run: The DC Comics Art of Adam Hughes (2010)
- Danny Fingeroth's Write Now! (2002)
- Defenders (2001)
- Detective Comics (1937)
- DNAgents (1983)
- DNAgents (2004)
- Doom Patrol (1987)
- Eclipse Monthly (1983)
- Essential Marvel Team-Up (2002)
- Essential Marvel Two-In-One (2005)
- Essential Peter Parker, The Spectacular Spider-Man (2005)
- Essential Spider-Woman (2005)
- Essential X-Factor (2005)
- Essential X-Men (1999)
- Eternals (1985)
- Excalibur Visionaries: Alan Davis (2009)
- Excalibur: Air Apparent (1991)
- Excalibur: XX Crossing (1992)
- Fantastic Four (1961)
- Fantastic Four Visionaries: John Byrne (2005)
- Fantastic Four: World's Greatest Comics Magazine (2001)
- Farscape: War Torn (2002)
- The Flash (1987)
- Freak Force (1993)
- Gen13 (1995)
- Giant Size Spider-Man (1998)
- Glory (1995)
- Glory (1996)
- Glory (1999)
- Green Lantern Corps Quarterly (1992)
- Green Lantern/Sinestro Corps Secret Files (2008)
- Heroes for Hope Starring the X-Men (1985)
- Highbrow Entertainment (1994)
- Infinity Inc. (1984)
- Invasion! (1988)
- The Invincible Iron Man DVD-ROM (2007)
- The Invincible Iron Man (2007)
- Iron Man (1968)
- Judgment Day (1997)
- Judgment Day Sourcebook (1997)
- Justice League (1987)
- Justice League International (1987)
- Legion of Super-Heroes (1984)
- Legion of Super-Heroes (1989)
- Lobo's Greatest Hits (1991)
- Marvel Age (1983)
- Marvel Comics Presents (1988)
- Marvel Holiday Special (1991)
- Marvel Premiere (1972)
- Marvel Team-Up (1972)
- Marvel Two-In-One (1974)
- Master of Kung Fu (1974)
- Mek (2003)
- Miracleman (1985)
- New Men (1994)
- Orion (2000)
- Phantom Force (1993)
- Power Man and Iron Fist (1978)
- Power Pack (1984)
- Powerline (1988)
- Quack! (1976)
- Reload/Mek (2004)
- Rocket Raccoon (1985)
- Sabretooth Classic (1994)
- The Savage Dragon (1993)
- The Savage Sword of Conan (1974)
- Secret Origins (1986)
- The Sensational She-Hulk (1989)
- Silver Surfer (1987)
- Soulsearchers and Company (1993)
- The Spectacular Spider-Man (1976)
- Spider-Man Comics Weekly (UK) (1973)
- Spider-Man Visionaries: Roger Stern (2007)
- Spider-Man: Birth of Venom (2007)
- Spider-Man: The Cosmic Adventures (1993)
- Spider-Woman (1978)
- Superman & Savage Dragon: Chicago (2002)
- Supreme (1992)
- Supreme (1997)
- Supreme: The New Adventures (1996)
- Supreme: The Return (1999)
- Surge (1984)
- Tales Of The New Gods (2008)
- Tales of the Teen Titans (1984)
- Thor (1966)
- Thundercats (1985)
- Timber Wolf (1992)
- Tom Strong (1999)
- The Transformers (UK) (1984)
- The Transformers (1984)
- The Transformers: Generations (2006)
- Uncanny X-Men (1963)
- Valor (1992)
- Web of Spider-Man (1985)
- What If? (1977)
- What The--?! (1988)
- Who's Who in Star Trek (1987)
- Who's Who in the DC Universe (1990)
- Who's Who in the Legion of Super-Heroes (1988)
- Who's Who: The Definitive Directory of the DC Universe (1985)
- Who's Who: Update '87 (1987)
- Who's Who: Update '88 (1988)
- Who's Who: Update '93 (1992)
- Wildstar (1995)
- Wildstar: Sky Zero (1993)
- Women of Marvel (2006)
- X-Men: Mutant Massacre (1999)
- X-Men: The Asgardian Wars (1989)
- Youngblood Super Special (1997)

=== Writer ===
- Legion of Super-Heroes (1989)
- Timber Wolf (1992)
- Who's Who: Update '93 (1992)
- Wildstar: Sky Zero (1993)
- WildStar (1995)
- "Tarzan" feature in Dark Horse Presents (2012)
- "The Once and Future Tarzan" (2012)

=== Penciller ===
- The DC Comics Encyclopedia (2004)
- Judgment Day (2003)
- Web of Spider-Man (1985)
- What If? (1977)

=== Cover artist ===
- The Adventures of The New Men (1996)
- Amazing Heroes (1981)
- The Amazing Spider-Man (1963)
- Ambush Bug Nothing Special (1992)
- America's Best Comics Preview (1999)
- America's Best Comics Primer (2008)
- DNAgents (1983)
- Doctor Strange, Sorcerer Supreme (1988)
- Doom Patrol (1987)
- Freak Force (1993)
- Ghost Rider (1973)
- Infinity Inc. (1984)
- Justice League International (1987)
- L.E.G.I.O.N. (1989)
- League of Champions (1990)
- Legion of Super-Heroes (1989)
- Legion: Secret Files (1998)
- Legionnaires (1993)
- The Malibu Sun (1992)
- Marvel Comics Presents (1988)
- The New DNAgents (1985)
- New Men (1994)
- Nova (1999)
- The Official Teen Titans Index (1985)
- The Outsiders (1985)
- Rocket Raccoon (1985)
- The Savage Dragon (1993)
- Secret Origins (1986)
- Shadow Reavers (2001)
- Surge (1984)
- Timber Wolf (1992)
- Tom Strong (1999)
- The Trouble with Girls (1989)
- Valor (1992)
- Who's Who in the DC Universe (1990)
- Wildstar (1995)
- Wildstar: Sky Zero (1993)
- Youngblood (1998)
- Youngblood Super Special (1997)

=== Editor ===
- WildStar: Sky Zero
- WildStar
- WildStar: Sky Zero (The Collected Trade Paperback).
- Fred Hembeck's The Near Complete Essential Hembeck Archives Omnibus. "Official Unofficial Editor."
- Timespirits (The Collected Trade Paperback).
