= Flashpoint (Korman novel) =

2014 novel by Gordon Korman

- Author: Gordon Korman
- Series: Unstoppable
- Published: August 26, 2014
- Preceded by: Countdown
- Followed by: Mission Titanic

Flashpoint is the fourth and final book in the Unstoppable series. It was written by Gordon Korman, and published on August 26, 2014.

In Flashpoint, the events of Unstoppable end. The final ingredient of the antidote is finally found, and Pierce is defeated for good. However, in the next series, Doublecross, a new villain arises, the Outcast, who challenges the Cahill leadership.

== Plot ==
=== Chapters 1-10 (Pages 1-78) ===
The book begins with Dan Cahill, who was abducted by Cara and Galt Pierce. He thinks about the last twelve hours, in which great horrors took place. For example, Pierce is nearly president, Pony was killed trying to save Dan, and Amy only has a few more days to live due to the undiluted serum she took to save Dan. Galt and Cara Pierce, the children of J. Rutherford Pierce, begin to interrogate Dan by injecting him with sodium pentathol, or truth serum. They ask him about the antidote to the serum which Dan and the others are trying to create. Galt states how Pierce decoded Olivia Cahill's Household Book, which tells how to create the antidote. However, Dan, using his sarcasm, covers up, saying how Pierce "figured out our secret recipe for potato salad". By the end of the interrogation, they have confirmed that the last antidote ingredient is in Angkor, Cambodia. Angkor was one of the most developed societies of the ancient world. Dan inhales chloroform in order to pass out. Galt repeatedly wants to kill Dan, while Cara wants to keep him for further interrogation. They plan to fly to Cambodia in order to thwart the Cahills' plans. Meanwhile, in Guatemala, Amy drives like a NASCAR driver on a road meant for ox carts. They almost crash into an enormous logging truck, but due to Amy's enhanced powers, they are saved. In the car are Ian Kabra, the Rosenbloom brothers, and Amy Cahill. They discuss the venom of the Tonle Sap snake, which is the final ingredient to the antidote. When they reach Guatemala City, they board Jonah's Gulfstream G6. Jonah had called for an autograph session in order to ward of Pierce's goons, although he does not reveal this to Broderick, his father.

Meanwhile, in New York City's Central Park, J. Rutherford Pierce talks about his platform to over 500,000 supporters. Pierce plans to first become US president, then take control of the entire world. Pierce planned to rock several foreign cities with nuclear bombs, then take advantage of the chaos to become a dictator of the entire planet. Meanwhile, on Jonah's jet over the Pacific Ocean en route to Cambodia, Amy reflects on her increasing side effects. Also, they find out that a "Code A" is actually tracking the location of the Pierce's. Meanwhile, the Pierce luxury jet stops on Midway Atoll, the site of one of the greatest battles of World War 2. However, Cara actually helps Dan escape, and he runs out of the plane. Soon, Jonah's plane arrives, nearly killing Dan. Dan tries to defend himself with a crowbar, but discovers Amy and the others. He recounts his interrogation, and they board the plane to go to Cambodia.

In Trilon Labs, Delaware, Nellie Gomez and Sammy Mourad have been exposed as imposters and are jailed in the building. However, Nellie attempts to win her jailers approval by cooking for them. Sammy and Nellie discuss their ultimate goal: "to sterilize the test tubes", which is code for destroying Trilon Labs. Finally, the Cahills arrive at Phnom Penh, the capital of Cambodia and the location of the country's largest airport. Hamilton Holt is waiting for them with a rickety boat called the "Kaoh Kong". He plans to get a Tonle Sap snake on the way to Siem Reap and Angkor War. However, the journey takes over eight hours in extreme heat, and no one likes the idea. Soon, they pass the village of Kampong Chhnang, and enter the Tonle Sap, the largest lake in Cambodia. Amy thinks that it looks like a gigantic liquid mirror. And, over half of Cambodia depends on the lake for their protein source. After the group reaches Siem Reap, they book a room at Jayavarman-Sleep Here. The room is clean and spacious, and the owner, Mrs. Bopha, spoke no language known to humankind. Meanwhile, on an island 27 miles east of Mai ne, now called Pierce Landing, Pierce has an interview, while Debi Ann discover Olivia's Household Book, and that Pierce still has Hope Cahill on his mind. In Cambodia, the group reaches Angkor Wat, which is extremely enormous. Angkor Wat is a funerary monument that was made of stone and had five tall towers, the middle one over two hundred feet tall. However, Jonah and Hamilton visit the Rith Map Crocodile Farm, as the snakes were originally crocodile food before they became endangered. When Jonah sees a snake in a croc pen, Hamilton jumps in without a thought, nearly getting eaten by a crocodile. Meanwhile, back at Angkor Wat, Ian Kabra discovers that April May, the hacker against Pony, is actually Cara Pierce. Cara is afraid of her father's terrible plans, and wants to help the Cahills defeat him. However, Amy and Dan have to decide on this matter.

However, while the Rosenblooms and the Cahills are hunting for Tonle Sap snakes, they discover that Galt and five thugs are chasing them. Atticus lead them into Ta Keo to hide, which was the only temple in Angkor that was never finished. However, the discover that they are trapped, and that there is no place for them to go inside the temple. But Amy finds a hidden room beneath them due to her serum-enhanced powers.

=== Chapters 11-20 (Pages 79-148) ===
The groups agrees with Amy and moves some stones in order to go into the room. However, it is easy for Galt and his goons to discover their hiding place. Meanwhile, Amy detects gunpowder in the room, and Atticus discovers that there are ancient fireworks in the room. The ancient Khmer used the fireworks in rituals and celebrations, after learning it from Chinese travelers. When Galt and the thugs enter the room, the groups sets of the fireworks and knocks them out. Then, the groups escapes from Ta Keo, and points several Cambodian police in the direction of the temple.

Meanwhile, at Trilon Labs, Delaware, Nellie and Sammy are supposedly creating the "Franken-serum", which was a version of the Cahill serum that had not side-effects at all yet provided all of the enhanced powers associated with the serum. However, they are actually trying to "sterilize the test tubes", or destroy the complex and halt the production of serum. They are trying to do this by creating hundreds of gallons of nitroglycerin and detonate them to blow up the entire complex. Even though Nellie is almost discovered transporting nitroglycerin by Dr. Benoit, senior ranking scientist at the lab, she makes it to her destination- storeroom 117A.

The next morning, the Cahills try to get an early start on finding the Tonle Sap snake and extracting its venom. However, they try to catch the snakes in Tonle Sap itself, rather than near Angkor Wat. Hamilton states how the police traced the Kaoh Kong back to him, and how he is a "person of interest." Ian also tells the group about his conversation with April May, aka Cara Pierce. They debate whether to trust her and allow her to help the Cahills. Although Dan, who is the new leader of the Cahills, trusts her after she helped him, Amy is more stubborn and refuses to yield. Dan reflects on how his greatest fear is losing his sister. Amy is everything to him, and if he lost her, he would lose himself as well. Soon, they enter the Tonle Sap, which swells to almost six times its usual size during the monsoon season. Atticus sees a snake, which causes a pandemonium, but results in nothing. However, they discover that Amy has passed out and almost drowned in the water. Hamilton shakes her to expel almost a quart of Tonle Sap sludge.

Soon, however, Galt and his five goons appear. Galt is extremely mad, as he was grilled for eight hours after being discovered in Ta Keo. Pierce had to bribe the police in order to secure his freedom. As the two groups clash, Jake yells out a command to stop, as a goon is holding Atticus underwater and trying to drown him. The Cahills surrender, with the battle lost. However, Jonah spots a "log", and throws a rock at it. Immediately, a thirteen-foot crocodile erupts in front of Galt. Taking advantage of the chaos, the Cahills escape, and find out that their mode of transportation is gone. But, a black Humvee with a masked rider roars up the road, and the Cahills enter the vehicle. They discover that the driver is actually Cara Pierce.

Cara reveals how if Pierce is defeated, everything else will fall into place. Suddenly, Ian discovers a Tonle Sap snake in his Gucci, which promptly bites him on his nose. After putting the snake in a water jug, they decide to allow Cara into their guesthouse on the 3 conditions below:

- Cara would surrender her phone, and the GPS chip would be removed and destroyed.
- Cara would be blindfolded until she was indoors.
- She would be handcuffed and restrained.

Cara agrees to all of the conditions, and is escorted to the hotel. As everyone goes to sleep, Cara reflects on how she is a traitor to her own flesh and blood. However, she believes that it is the right thing to do. J. Rutherford Pierce had gone to the dark side somewhere along the line, and she reflected on how her father was looking at nuclear bomb triggers on one occasion. When Jake wakes up early in the morning, he discovers that both Cara and the snake are gone, only to discover that Cara had bought an aquarium for the snake, and checked in with her brother. However, she tried to earn their trust by coming back after sneaking out. Cara begins to tell the Cahill about Pierce's All-American Clambake. Meanwhile, Nellie and Sammy succeed in blowing up Trilon Labs and escaping.

In Cambodia, Galt Pierce tries to prevent Jonah's airplane from landing, but fails. Sammy and Nellie escape to Harvard University in Cambridge, Massachusetts. The Cahills arrive there as well, and replicate the antidote on a mass scale. They decide to test the antidote on Fiske Cahill, who is near death.

=== Chapters 21-32 (Pages 149-222) ===
The antidote works, after it is tested on Fiske. Amy practices flying, and Jake worries about her. Finally, the climax arrives as the Cahills arrive at Pierce Landing for Pierce's All-American Clambake. Amy and Jake fly over the landing and delivers the antidote. And, they make sure that Pierce's nukes do not blow up. The book ends with a victory over Pierce.
