= Drawing a Blank =

2006 young adult novel by Daniel Ehrenhaft

- First edition cover
- Author: Daniel Ehrenhaft
- Illustrator: Trevor Ristow
- Genre: Young adult fiction
- Publisher: HarperTeen
- Publication date: April 25, 2006
- ISBN: 978-0-060-75252-1

Drawing a Blank, or How I Tried to Solve a Mystery, End a Feud, and Land the Girl of My Dreams is a 2006 young adult novel written by Daniel Ehrenhaft and illustrated by Trevor Ristow. The novel is set in the United States and Scotland, featuring a 17-year-old comic book fan as the protagonist.

== Plot summary ==
At the beginning of his junior year at Carnegie Mansion, a prestigious private school, Carlton A. Dunne IV attempts to go through the year without attracting attention to himself as he has done for the past two years. He has a fondness for art and a "secret" identity as a Connecticut comic strip artist.

When his father is kidnapped by a Scottish clan exacting revenge for a feud nearly a thousand years ago, Carlton is drawn into the battle. After arriving in Scotland, he meets Aileen, an 18-year-old Scot who plans to become a cop and wants to be on Cops in America. After learning of Carlton's story she vows to help him on his quest.

The pair venture to Northern Scotland where they attempt to solve the mystery surrounding Carlton's dad. They are gradually drawn into the clan's mythology, a mythology that both Carlton's dad and his kidnapper strongly believe is true.

== Setting ==
The first quarter of the book is set in Connecticut while the rest is set in the northern part of Scotland, in the area known as Orkney.

The majority of the action takes place in small towns or villages, occasionally in a forest or a castle. The castle of Castle Glanach is on the coast of the Loch of Stenness.

== Characters ==
- Carlton Dunne IV: He is a junior in high school, with a love of comic book drawing and art.
- Carlton Dunne III: A middle age architect who is obsessed with his family mythology, particularly the stories surrounding an ancient dagger.
- Aileen/Annabel MacClough: An eighteen-year-old Scot obsessed with the show Cops who helps Carlton on his journey. She is the daughter of Gregor MacClough.
- Gregor MacClough:the father of Annabel and main antagonist of the book. He is the one that kidnaps Carlton IV's dad. Owns two double-barreled shotguns.
- Martha: Dunne III's ex-wife whom he married after his first wife died. They are still in love and care for each other.
- Olivia: Martha and Dunne III's young daughter with an invisible friend named Conrad MacSchtoon.
- Bryce Perry: A fellow student at Carlton's school who spends his time tormenting and teasing Carlton.
- "Night Mare": An unknown fan of Signy the Superbad and the only person who ever emails Carlton.He is really Bryce Perry.
- Roger Lovejoy: Carlton Dunne IV's editor, who believes that Carlton is a middle age man. He is boisterous and annoying.
- Mr. Herzong: Dunne IV's creative writing teacher.
- "Signy the Superbad": Carlton Dunne IV's fictional heroine and star of his syndicated comic strip. Wears a tartan mini skirt and sports a sword.

== Author ==
Daniel Ehrenhaft is the author of several novels, including Tell It to Naomi, The After Life and 10 Things to Do Before I Die. Other books include The Last Dog on Earth, The Thing Under the Bed and Killer Clowns of King County.

He attended Columbia University.

== Illustrator ==
Trevor Ristow illustrated the comic books sections of Drawing a Blank. He is a film editor whose projects include the 2003 film Book of Love and 2004's Poster Boy.

He lives in New York City.

== Allusions ==
- Led Zeppelin when Bryce Perry has his "who-would-you-bang-forum."
- Numerous Marvel Comics references.
- Charles M. Schulz mentions in relation to Peanuts.
- Alfred E. Neuman is mentioned, as is his famous line, "What, me worry?"
- A large theme of the story is the Panopticon.
- Characters attend a Comicon-like event called Comic-Expo.

== Editions ==
- ISBN 0-06-075252-1
