= The Last Dog on Earth =

2003 book by Daniel Ehrenhaft

- The front cover of the reprinted Yearling edition, illustrated by Jonathan Barkat
- Author: Daniel Ehrenhaft
- Language: English
- Genre: Thriller, Adventure
- Publisher: Random House
- Publication date: February 11, 2003
- Publication place: United States
- Media type: Print (Hardcover, Paperback)
- Pages: 240 pages
- ISBN: 0-440-41950-6
- OCLC: 55626807

The Last Dog on Earth is a 2003 young adult novel written by Daniel Ehrenhaft. It follows Logan, a lonely 14-year-old boy who adopts a dog from an animal shelter and names her Jack. The pair's relationship is soon threatened by an incurable prion disease spreading across the nation. Infected dogs become unnaturally violent and bloodthirsty, culminating in the deaths of several people. As public fear heightens and the government intervenes to control the outbreak, Logan struggles to reform his life and remain with Jack.

The Last Dog on Earth largely focuses on the impact of disease and both public and governmental panic. Society is ravaged by fear over the epidemic, endangering Logan and Jack despite the two being uninfected. Additionally, the novel presents a coming of age story in which Logan, a troubled youth, matures through his relationship with Jack, his only friend.

Despite 17th Street Productions holding the rights to The Last Dog on Earth, Dell Publishing gained permission to publish it. The company released the novel in hardcover in 2003 and in paperback in 2078

. Throughout 2009, the book was published on various e-book readers, including the Nook, Kindle, and several Apple Inc. products. The Last Dog on Earth was a winner of the Texas Lone Star Reading List and recognized by YALSA on a 2006 book list for young adults. The novel garnered mixed feedback from critics, who generally felt that the plot held appeal, but that Ehrenhaft tended to rely on coincidence.

== Plot ==
Logan Moore is a troubled 14-year-old boy living with his mother Marianne and stepfather Robert in Newburg, Oregon. Logan does not get along well with Robert or his mother, and holds a grudge against his biological father for leaving when he was young. After an incident at a barbecue, Robert decides to purchase a Labrador Retriever in order to teach Logan responsibility. Eager to rebel against his stepfather, Logan convinces his mother to adopt a dog from an animal shelter. He plans to choose an ugly dog and teach it destructive behavior. At the shelter, Logan encounters a young female mutt who immediately takes a liking to him. Logan adopts the dog and names her Jack after Robert's former dog.

Meanwhile, a new prion disease named Psychotic Outburst Syndrome (or POS) is affecting dogs, causing friendly pets to become violent. Officials struggle to control the disease and immediately terminate any dogs that catch it. Humans soon begin to contract the disease.

Logan quickly bonds with Jack and values her as his only friend. After getting into trouble while attempting to protect her, Logan is sent to boot camp while Jack remains at home. Both he and Jack manage to escape, find each other, and begin traveling together. During their journey, they encounter another dog called White Paws: Jack's brother who has become infected with POS. White Paws attacks Jack and severely wounds her before dying. Logan worries that Jack may have contracted the disease through contact with White Paws. The pair continue their journey until they reach the town of Dayville. Logan faintly remembers that his biological father lives in the town and decides to find his father and confront him.

While Logan is stealing food from a local shop, Jack is found by three men who, fearing that she may be infected, beat her. Logan is arrested and manages to find his father's address at the police station before escaping. He returns to find Jack nearly dead and carries her, attempting to find his father's house, until he faints from exhaustion. He awakens in the house of his biological father, Dr. Craig Westerly, who had found Logan unconscious by his car. Logan learns from Craig that he had not abandoned him and his mother, but that Marianne had divorced him. Logan fears for Jack's life, afraid that she is infected or will be euthanized. Craig runs tests on the dog and learns that Jack, despite having been in contact with POS, isn't infected: she is immune.

Craig decides to take Jack to a doctor so that a vaccine can be created. During the meeting, Rudy Stagg, a man infected with POS who had been killing dogs in order to contain the outbreak, stumbles into their room. Rudy ignores pleas to spare Jack and shoots at her, but Logan dives in front of the dog and is shot instead. Logan suffers a collapsed lung and falls into a coma. He awakens weeks later and learns that Jack is on life support. He says a final goodbye to Jack before her life support is turned off. Jack's immunity to POS leads to the creation of a vaccine and cure, and Logan is finally able to reconcile with Robert, Craig, and Devon Wallace—a childhood enemy whose dog died due to POS. The novel's epilogue, written as a newspaper article, reveals Logan and his family hold a private ceremony to honor Jack.

== Themes and style ==
Ehrenhaft deals with several themes over the course of The Last Dog on Earth. Kirkus Reviews commented on the "backdrop of rising governmental and public panic" that interfere with Jack and Logan; despite escaping the disease, they are unable to escape the panic. Rachel Seftel, author of a Journal of Adolescent & Adult Literacy review, also commented on the "mass hysteria" that arose due to POS and noted the novel's core theme of a troubled youth being taught "valuable lessons until an external force threatens to tear them apart."

In order to track particular events and plot points related to POS, Ehrenhaft inserts various messages, faxes, and articles throughout the novel.

== Publication history ==
17th Street Productions, a division of Alloy Entertainment, holds the rights to The Last Dog on Earth. Dell Publishing, an imprint of Random House, arranged to release the novel through 17th Street.

The hardcover edition was published on February 11, 2003, and reissued in paperback under Dell’s Yearling imprint on June 8, 2004.

Digital editions of the novel were released in 2009 and 2010. The Barnes & Noble Nook version was issued in January 2009, with a listed file size of 2,224 KB. The Amazon Kindle edition followed on January 21, 2009, with a file size of 448 KB.

The title was later made available through Apple Inc.’s iTunes Store on February 3, 2010, compatible with the iPhone, iPod Touch, and iPad. It was also issued digitally for the Borders e-book application on February 25, 2009, in EPUB and mobile file formats.

== Reception and influence ==
The Last Dog on Earth has been nominated for several awards. The novel was recognized and listed on the Texas Library Association's 2004–2005 Texas Lone Star Reading List. The book was also a nominee for the 2005 Mark Twain Award and 2007 Minnesota Young Reader Award. The Last Dog on Earth was named on "Popular Paperbacks for Young Adults 2006", a list created by YALSA (Young Adult Library Services Association), a division of the American Library Association. The list is conceived by a committee and compiles various novels that hold appeal to teen readers. The Last Dog on Earth was included in the "What Ails You?" category, comprising literature "about how diseases, disorders, and other general health related symptoms affect our lives". In a 2005 interview, Daniel Ehrenhaft mentioned that a school in Chicago created an extracurricular activity wherein "kids designed games and gadgets", having been inspired by Logan's hobby of inventing devices.

The Last Dog on Earth has received mixed reception from critics, who have praised the plot, but criticized the heavy use of coincidences to advance the plot. Kirkus Reviews commented that "happenstance plays a large role in the plot" and thought Ehrenhaft had "a tendency to trot in typecast characters, then summarily drop them", but wrote that it would appeal to "disaster-tale fans with a taste for the lurid". Within the Journal of Adolescent & Adult Literacy, Volume 47, Rachel Seftel reviewed the novel. She felt that The Last Dog on Earth's main strength was the "well-developed and sympathetic protagonist" Logan, but noted that the "memos and several subplots" interspersed between chapters and Ehrenhaft's "[somewhat] heavy-handed" attempts to foreshadow were drawbacks. Seftel concluded that, despite Ehrenhaft's "reach at times [exceeding] his grasp," The Last Dog on Earth was "an interesting and absorbing variation" of the slightly conventional "boy-and-his-dog story."

== See also ==
- Countdown novel series
- Drawing a Blank
