= Countdown (comics) =

Countdown, in comics, may refer to:

- Countdown (Polystyle Publications), a British comic series of the early 1970s
- Countdown to Final Crisis, a DC Comics series
- DC Countdown, the name originally listed for Countdown to Infinite Crisis

== See also ==
- Countdown (disambiguation)
