= Jerry Ordway =

American comic book writer & artist (born 1957)

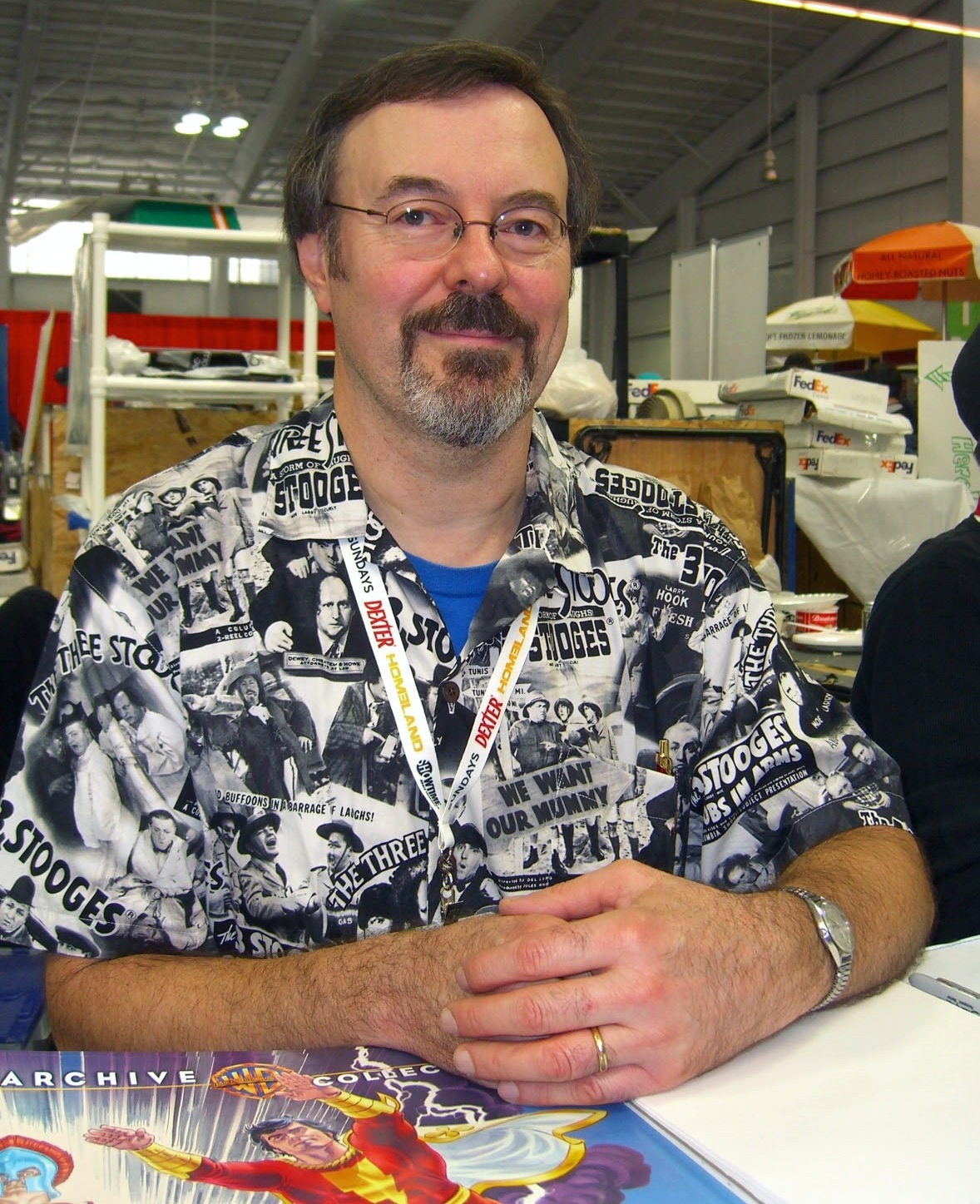
- Ordway at the 2012 New York Comic Con
- Born: Jeremiah Joseph Ordway; November 28, 1957 (age 68)
- Areas: Writer, Penciller, Inker
- Notable works: The Adventures of Superman; All-Star Squadron; Crisis on Infinite Earths; Infinity, Inc. The Power of Shazam! Superman
- Awards: Inkpot Award (1994); Inkwell Awards (2017): Joe Sinnott Hall of Fame

Jeremiah Joseph Ordway (born November 28, 1957) is an American writer, penciller, inker and painter of comic books.

He is known for his inking work on a wide variety of DC Comics titles, including the continuity-redefining Crisis on Infinite Earths (1985–1986), his long run working on the Superman titles from 1986 to 1993, and for writing and painting the Captain Marvel original graphic novel The Power of Shazam! (1994), and writing the ongoing monthly series from 1995 to 1999. He has provided inks for artists such as Curt Swan, Jack Kirby, Gil Kane, John Buscema, Steve Ditko, John Byrne, George Perez and others.

== Early life and influences ==
Jerry Ordway attended Milwaukee Technical High School, where he took a three-year commercial art course, before joining a commercial art studio as a typographer in 1976. He subsequently worked his way "from the ground floor up at the art studio" between 1978 and 1981.

Among the artists Ordway considers influential are Curt Swan, Jack Kirby, Gil Kane, John Buscema, Steve Ditko, all of whose pencils he would later ink over. He cites Gene Colan, Wally Wood, Alex Raymond, Hal Foster, and Roy Crane as early inspirations. He names contemporaries such as Lee Weeks, John Romita Jr., Ron Garney, Mike Weiringo and Alan Davis, and inkers such as Joe Sinnott, Dick Giordano, Tom Palmer and Klaus Janson.

== Comics career ==
Before beginning his professional career as an inker, Jerry Ordway entered the comics industry as an artist and publisher for small-press comics fanzines. Ordway discovered Marvel comics in "June of 1967," and wrote in 1975 (aged 17) that he had "been drawing superheroes [ever] since." His first published work, a story entitled "The Messenger", appeared in Tim Corrigan's Superhero Comics No. 4 (April, 1975), and his own self-published fanzine Okay Comix followed in May–June, 1975. Okay Comix featured stories by Ordway and his friend Dave Koula, and art predominantly by Ordway himself. Ordway's own hero "Proton" headlined the 'zine, which featured a pin-up of a character "called Acrobat" who was "the first superhero [Ordway] created. His birth was Dec. 1969."

Spending the late 1970s working as a painter in a commercial art studio in Milwaukee, between 1978 and 1979, he provided illustrations for a number of fanzines and pro-zines, including Omniverse and The Comics Journal. His first professional work was for Western Publishing's Golden Books on young-reader Marvel books, and the Superheroes Golden Beginning Stampbook '79.

=== DC Comics ===
Having produced comics-related artwork for fanzines and licensed publishers, Ordway attended "a talent search at the 1980 Chicago Comicon," held by DC Comics. After showing them his "DC related artwork from the Golden Books," he "walked away with a promise of work." This work began in the summer of 1980 for "DC's anthology comics", (including Weird War Tales and Mystery in Space) in which he "inked Carmine Infantino, Trevor Von Eeden, as well as Joe Staton, and Dave Cockrum." After continuing to work at the art studio for a further six months, inking comics for DC by night, Ordway began "freelancing full time in February 1981." During the mid-1980s, he "shared a studio with other artists, including Machlan, Pat Broderick, and Al Vey".

At DC, he would illustrate All-Star Squadron, a series which he helped launch in an insert preview in Justice League of America No. 193 (Aug. 1981). With writer Roy Thomas, he co-created Infinity, Inc. in All-Star Squadron No. 25 (Sept. 1983) and the new team was launched in its own series in March 1984. Ordway inked DC Comics Presents Annual No. 4 (1985) over artist Eduardo Barreto's pencils, was one of several artists on Batman Annual No. 9 (July 1985), inked George Pérez's pencils on the epic crossover miniseries Crisis on Infinite Earths in 1985 and Superman artist Wayne Boring's pencils for a retelling of the definitive Golden Age Superman origin story written by Roy Thomas in Secret Origins No. 1 (April 1986), which he considers a particular favorite. Ordway was the penciller and inker for the DC Comics adaptation of the 1989 Batman film which was published as a "movie special".

Ordway has noted that "Inking is a weird job, because as much as you put into it, the page still belongs to the penciler."

=== Superman ===
In 1986, along with writer/artist John Byrne and writer Marv Wolfman, Ordway revamped Superman, in the wake of the Ordway-inked continuity-redefining maxiseries Crisis on Infinite Earths. Launching, with a revised origin and new continuity, in Byrne's miniseries, The Man of Steel, Superman soon returned to featuring in a number of titles. After the titular title Superman was cancelled and replaced with The Man of Steel, it was relaunched as The Adventures of Superman, continuing the numbering of the original Superman series, with Wolfman as writer and Ordway as artist.

When Wolfman departed the title with issue #435, Byrne briefly took over script writing duties before Ordway assumed the mantle of writer-artist and took over the series solely with issue #445 (Oct. 1988), making his writing debut two issues earlier with #443 (Aug. 1988). Ordway had also served as co-plotter on a few issues during both Wolfman and Bryne's writing tenures (issues #426, 435–437, 439–442, and 444). Switching from The Adventures of Superman, Ordway became the writer-artist on the companion title Superman vol. 2 between #34 (Aug. 1989) and #55 (May 1991), before later returning to Adventures of Superman as writer and sometimes as cover artist from issues #480 (July 1991) to #500 (June 1993). Ordway was the writer and primary artist for the story in which Clark Kent proposes to Lois Lane (Superman vol. 2 #50). While writing for the Superman family of titles, Ordway cowrote such storylines as "Panic in the Sky" and "The Death of Superman" storyline in 1992. After seven years working on the character, Ordway largely left the Superman titles in 1993, although he would make frequent returns to the character as writer and throughout his career, co-writing Adventures of Superman with Karl Kesel from issues #539–540, 558–562, 564–567 in 1996, and 1998–1999. In Nov. 2017, he drew the variant cover for Action Comics #992 (cover dated Jan. 2018).

During the 50th anniversary celebrations for Superman, he inked John Byrne's pencils for the cover of the March 14, 1988 issue of Time magazine and an interior spread celebrating the Man of Steel's anniversary. Ordway has produced a large number of covers for DC from 1982 onwards, including for issues of Secret Origins and the painted cover art to the hardcover reprint collection The Greatest Golden Age Stories Ever Told. He produced the cover art for the prestige format graphic novels, Superman: The Earth Stealers in 1988 where he inked Curt Swan's pencils and Superman For Earth (1991), among other work.

=== Captain Marvel ===
In 1994, Ordway masterminded the return of the original Captain Marvel to the DC Universe with the 96-page hardcover graphic novel The Power of Shazam!, which he both wrote and painted. The story saw Ordway depict the revamped origins of the former-Fawcett Comics superhero. It proved to be a success, and was followed by an ongoing monthly series, also titled The Power of Shazam! (which ran between 1995 and 1999). Ordway wrote and provided painted covers for the entire run of the regular series, as well as illustrating fill-in issues between series-regular artists Peter Krause and Mike Manley. Towards the end of the series' run, he again took on the dual role of writer & artist with issues #42–47.

=== Non-DC work ===
During the mid-1980s, Ordway provided covers and occasional artwork to titles from a number of different comics companies. Companies included Wendy and Richard Pini's WaRP Graphics, AC Comics, Charlton Comics, Paragon Publications and fan-turned-pro Marty Greim. For Eclipse Comics, Ordway provided pencils for a short "Epilogue" story in Mark Evanier's DNAgents No. 18 (Jan. 1985). He produced Munden's Bar for First Comics, and provided pencils and inks on an issue of T.H.U.N.D.E.R. Agents.

For Image Comics, Ordway co-created the character WildStar with Al Gordon in 1993, and published his creator-owned one-shot The Messenger in July 2000.

Although the vast majority of Ordway's professional work has been produced for DC, Ordway inked issues of Marvel's Fantastic Four. He produced occasional work for Marvel between 1984 and 1988, then returned a decade later to write and illustrate a three-issue arc of The Avengers vol. 3 #16–18 (1999), guest artist on Captain America (vol. 3) #32 (Aug. 2000) with writer Dan Jurgens, as well as penciling the four-issue crossover mini-series Maximum Security (#1–3 and prologue Dangerous Planet), and writer/penciller on a U.S. Agent mini-series in 2000–2001. He was artist for the one-shot Captain America and the Invaders: Bahamas Triangle with writer Roy Thomas, released in July 2019.

=== Other DC work ===
As well as inking most of Crisis on Infinite Earths, Ordway inked the second of DC's continuity-redefining event titles in 1994 by inking writer-artist Dan Jurgens' pencils on Zero Hour: Crisis in Time. In 2001, he drew the one-shot Just Imagine... Stan Lee with Jerry Ordway Creating the JLA as part of Marvel-stalwart Stan Lee's foray into the DC Universe, in which the two of them re-imagined DC's Justice League of America. He inked the last year (May 2002–May 2003) of the Batman-related title Azrael: Agent of the Bat (#88–100), and provided the artwork for a six-issue story arc in Wonder Woman (vol. 2, issues #189–194), with writer Walt Simonson in 2003. In 2004, Ordway was inker on JLA issues #94–99, the “Tenth Circle” story arc which reunited the former Uncanny X-Men creative team of writer Chris Claremont and artist John Byrne. From 2003–2008, he provided new covers to the Superman: The Man of Steel series of six trade paperbacks, collecting the early adventures of the Post-Crisis Superman. To celebrate the twentieth anniversary of the original Crisis, DC published Geoff Johns' Infinite Crisis limited series (Dec. 2005–June 2006), for which Ordway provided the artwork for the flashback scenes set on Earth-Two, including a recreation of the cover to Action Comics #1, which he cites as another favorite piece of his. In the wake of Infinite Crisis, he inked Dan Jurgens' pencils once again in the "History of the Multiverse" back-up stories in the weekly comic book Countdown (issues No. 39 and No. 38, Chapters 11 and 12) (October 2007).

His work since 2008 includes pencilling three issues of The Brave and the Bold (volume 2) (#11–13, May–July 2008) with writer Mark Waid, and pencils for Justice Society of America Annual No. 1 (Sept. 2008), alongside some interior artwork for the ongoing Justice Society of America series during late 2008. In 2012, Ordway worked on a Challengers of the Unknown storyline for DC Universe Presents with DC Co-Publisher Dan DiDio. Later that same year, he drew a Human Bomb limited series which was written by Justin Gray and Jimmy Palmiotti. Ordway and artist Steve Rude produced a Superman story for DC's Adventures of Superman digital series in 2014. Ordway drew the "Five Minutes" chapter in Action Comics #1000 (June 2018). He drew the new cover art for the trade paperback collection Wonder Woman By Walter Simonson and Jerry Ordway, collecting Wonder Woman vol. 2, issues #189–194 in 2018.

== Awards ==
Ordway received an Inkpot Award in 1994. In 2017, he was awarded the Inkwell Awards Joe Sinnott Hall of Fame Award for "an inking career in American comic books of outstanding accomplishment."

== Personal life ==
Ordway is married to Peggy May Ordway (b. 1959).

== Bibliography ==
=== DC Comics ===
- 52 #23 (Wildcat backup story) (artist) (2006)
- Action Comics #600 (Lois Lane backup story) (inks over Kurt Schaffenberger); #650 (penciller); #667 (artist); Annual #2 (writer/penciller) (1988–1991); #992 (variant cover art, 2017); #1000 (artist) (2018)
- Adventure Comics vol. 2 #4–5 (penciller) (2010)
- Adventures of Superman #424–442 (435 with Marv Wolfman) (artist); #431 (inks over Erik Larsen); #436–438, 444 (plotter/penciller); #443, 445–451, 453–456, 480–500, 539–540, 558–562, 564–567 (writer); #445–451, 453–455 (writer/penciller) (1987–1999)
- Adventures of Superman vol. 2 #17 (writer) (2014)
- All New Atom #19 (penciller) (2008)
- All-Star Squadron #1–5 (inks over Rich Buckler); #6–15, Annual #1 (inks over Adrian Gonzales); #19–26, 29, Annual #2–3 (penciller) (1981–1984)
- America vs. the Justice Society #1 (artist, page 12); #1-4 (cover artist) (1984-1985)
- The Authority: The Lost Year #12 (penciller) (2010)
- Batman Annual #9 (artist) (1985)
- The Batman Chronicles #7 (writer) (1997)
- Batman:The Official Comic Adaptation #1 (artist) (1989)
- Blackest Night: Tales of the Corps #1 (artist) (2009)
- Booster Gold vol. 2 #13–14 (inks over Pat Olliffe); #30 (artist) (2008–2010)
- The Brave and the Bold vol. 3 #11–13 (penciller) (2008)
- Convergence: Infinity Inc. #1–2 (writer) (2015)
- Countdown #39–38 (inks over Dan Jurgens) (2007)
- Crisis on Infinite Earths #5–12 (inks over George Perez) (1985–1986)
- Dark Nights: Death Metal The Secret Origin (2021) (artist)
- DC Comics Presents Annual #4 (inks over Eduardo Barreto) (1985)
- DC Comics Presents: Mystery in Space #1 (penciller) (2004)
- DC Nuclear Winter Special #1 (artist) (2019)
- DC Primal Age #1 (writer/artist) (2019)
- DC Universe: Legacies #6 (penciller); #7–8 (inks over Dan Jurgens) (2010–2011)
- DC Universe Presents #6–8 (Challengers of the Unknown) (penciller) (2012)
- The Death of Superman 30th Anniversary Special #1 (writer) (2023)
- Doomsday Annual #1 (writer/inker) (1995)
- Fanboy #1 (artist) (1999)
- Gog #1 (penciller) (1998)
- Green Lantern vol. 4 #49 (artist) (2010)
- Green Lantern vol. 5 #20 (artist) (2013)
- Green Lantern Corps #18 (inks over Jamal Yaseem Igle) (2008)
- Green Lantern Movie Prequel: Hal Jordan #1 (artist) (2011)
- Green Lantern Movie Prequel: Sinestro #1 (artist) (2011)
- Heroes Against Hunger #1 (inks) (1986)
- House of Mystery #319 (artist) (1983)
- Human Bomb #1–4 (artist) (2013)
- Infinite Crisis #5–6 (artist); #7 (inks) (2006)
- Infinite Crisis Secret Files 2006 #1 (inks over Dan Jurgens) (2006)
- Infinity, Inc. #1–10 (penciller); Annual #2 (1984–1988)
- JLA #94–99 (inks over John Byrne) (2004)
- JLA: Classified #34 (inks over Dan Jurgens) (2007)
- Joker: Last Laugh Secret Files #1 (writer) (2001)
- JSA #63–64 (penciller); #86–87 (artist) (2004–2006)
- JSA 80-Page Giant #1 (writer/artist) (2010)
- Just Imagine Stan Lee with Jerry Ordway Creating JLA #1 (artist) (2002)
- Justice League vol. 2 #40 (artist, among others) (2015)
- Justice League of America #193 (All-Star Squadron insert preview) (inks over Rich Buckler) (1981)
- Justice Society of America #18–21, 53, 54, Annual #1 (penciller); #23–25, 27–28 (writer/penciller) (2008–2011)
- Mystery in Space #117 (inks over Carmine Infantino) (1981)
- Outsiders #10 (artist); #13 (inks over Steve Ditko) (1986)
- Planetary/JLA: Terra Occulta #1 (artist) (2002)
- The Power of Shazam! HC (writer/artist) (1994)
- The Power of Shazam! #1–41, Annual #1 (writer); #42–47, #1,000,000 (writer/penciller) (1995–1999)
- Red Menace #1–6 (penciller) (2007)
- Secret Origins #1 (inks over Wayne Boring) (1986)
- Sergio Aragonés Destroys DC #1 (inks over Sergio Aragones) (1996)
- Showcase '95 #10 (writer) (1995)
- Showcase '96 #7 (writer) (1996)
- Superman vol. 2 #31, 34–35, 39, 110 (writer); #36–38, 40–47, 49–55 (writer/penciller); #57 (inks); #226 (artist) (1989–2006)
- Superman/Batman #72–75 (artist) (2010)
- Superman: Secret Files and Origins #1 (inks over Dan Jurgens) (1998)
- Superman: The Earth Stealers #1 (inks over Curt Swan) (1988)
- Superman: The Legacy of Superman #1 (writer) (1993)
- Superman: The Man of Steel #1 (inks over Jon Bogdanove); #1,000,000 (writer) (1991–1998)
- Superman: The Wedding Album #1 (inks) (1996)
- T.H.U.N.D.E.R. Agents #2 (artist) (2012)
- Tales of the Sinestro Corps: Superman Prime #1 (artist) (2007)
- Trinity #3–4, 16 (inks over Mike Norton) (2008)
- Weird War Tales #99 (inks over Dave Cockrum); #100, 103 (inks over Bob Hall); #102 (inks over Trevor Von Eden); #106 (inks over Joe Staton) (1981)
- Weird Worlds vol. 2 #1–6 (artist) (2011)
- Wonder Woman #294 (Huntress backup stories) (inks over Joe Staton) (1982)
- Wonder Woman vol. 2 #189–194 (penciller) (2003)
- Worlds' Finest #5 (artist) (2012)
- Zero Hour: Crisis in Time #4–0 (inks over Dan Jurgens) (1994)
- Zero Hour 30th Anniversary Special (artist) (2024)

==== America's Best Comics ====
- Tom Strong #5, 20–21 (penciller); #22, 31–32 (artist) (1999–2005)
- Tom Strong's Terrific Tales #3, 6 (artist) (2002–2003)
- Top 10: Beyond the Farthest Precinct #1–5 (artist) (2005–2006)

=== First Comics ===
- Grimjack #10 (artist) (1985)

=== Image Comics ===
- Action Planet Comics #3 (writer/artist) (1997)
- The Messenger (one-shot) (writer/artist) (2000)
- Phantom Force #1–2 (inks over Jack Kirby) (1994)
- Savage Dragon #100 (inks over Erik Larsen) (2002)
- WildStar: Sky Zero #1–4 (penciller) (1993)
- WildStar #1 (variant cover art inker) (1995)

=== Marvel Comics ===
- The Avengers vol. 3 #16–18 (writer/penciller) (1999)
- Captain America vol. 3 #32 (artist) (2000)
- Captain America and the Invaders: Bahamas Triangle (artist) (2019)
- Domination Factor: Avengers #2, 4, 6, 8 (writer/penciller) (1999–2000)
- Fantastic Four #276–283 (inks over John Byrne); #294–296 (penciller) (1985–1986)
- Hulk #9–11 (writer) (1999–2000)
- Marvel Comics #1001 (artist) (2019)
- Maximum Security #1–3 (penciller) (2000–2001)
- Maximum Security: Dangerous Planet #1 (penciller) (2000)
- Sub-Mariner: Marvels Snapshots (artist) (2020)
- Thor vol. 2 #9 (inks over John Buscema) (1999)
- Thor 2000 #1 (artist) (2000)
- U.S. Agent #1–3 (writer/penciller) (2001)
- What The--?! #2 (inks over John Byrne) (1988)

Preceded by Adrian Gonzales	All-Star Squadron artist 1983–1984	Succeeded by Rick Hoberg
Preceded by n/a	Infinity, Inc. artist 1984–1985	Succeeded by Don Newton
Preceded by Al Gordon	Fantastic Four inker 1985	Succeeded by Al Gordon
Preceded by n/a	The Adventures of Superman artist 1987–1989	Succeeded by Dan Jurgens
Preceded by John Byrne	The Adventures of Superman writer 1988–1989	Succeeded by Dan Jurgens
Preceded by Roger Stern (as writer); Kerry Gammill (as artist)	Superman vol. 2 writer/artist 1989–1991	Succeeded by Dan Jurgens
Preceded by Dan Jurgens	The Adventures of Superman writer 1991–1993	Succeeded by Karl Kesel
Preceded by John Byrne	Hulk writer 1999–2000 (with Ron Garney)	Succeeded by Paul Jenkins
Preceded by Phil Jimenez	Wonder Woman artist 2003	Succeeded by Drew Johnson
