= The Final Countdown =

The Final Countdown may refer to:

== Film and television ==
- The Final Countdown (film), a 1980 science fiction film
- "Final Countdown" (Outlaw Star), a 1998 episode of the anime Outlaw Star
- Saraba Kamen Rider Den-O: Final Countdown, a 2008 Japanese film, the third film adaptation of Kamen Rider Den-O
- "The Final Countdown" (The IT Crowd), a 2010 episode of The IT Crowd
- "The Final Countdown", an episode of Reginald the Vampire

== Music ==
- The Final Countdown (album), a 1986 studio album by the Swedish rock band Europe
  - "The Final Countdown" (song), the titular 1986 hit single from the aforementioned album

== Other uses ==
- Final Countdown (video game), a 1990 action video game for the Amiga
