= Countdown to Doomsday =

Countdown to Doomsday may refer to:

- Buck Rogers: Countdown to Doomsday, a computer game
- Countdown to Doomsday (film), a 1966 spy film
