= Countdown (novel series) =

Young adult novel series by Daniel Parker (Daniel Ehrenhaft)

- First in the series
- January, February, March April, May, June, July, August, September, October, November, December
- Author: Daniel Ehrenhaft
- Country: United States
- Language: English
- Genre: Teen fiction Science fiction Supernatural fiction
- Publisher: Simon Pulse
- Media type: Print

Countdown is a young adult novel series by Daniel Ehrenhaft under the pen name Daniel Parker. Set in a post-apocalyptic world, the series chronicles the year 1999 in short novels which represent individual months of the year. The series begins with January and follows the lives of its main characters through December.

== Author ==
Daniel Parker is generally believed to be the pseudonym of young-adult fiction writer Daniel Parker Ehrenhaft (to whom the books are jointly copyrighted). Ehrenhaft is the author of numerous other young-adult books including The Wessex Papers (2003) under the pseudonym Daniel Parker and The Last Dog on Earth (2005) under the name Daniel Ehrenhaft among other titles. According to Ehrenhaft's website , the author currently lives in Brooklyn, New York with his wife, Jessica.

== Plot overview ==
As the new year dawns, a reported "massive solar flare" causes power failures all over the globe and adults and children everywhere to melt into piles of "black goo." Only young adults are spared, among them a quartet of drunken high school kids in suburban Seattle, two teens whose fake IDs have gained them entry to a New York City nightclub, a cocky young doctor in a Texas hospital, a pair of tough-talking inmates in a Pittsburgh jail, and Sarah and Joshua Levy who desperately search the ancient scroll of their granduncle Elijah for clues to the apocalyptic event.

== Books ==
=== January ===
New Year's Day 1999 brings a strange solar flare, widescale power outages, and the death of everyone on Earth over twenty years old, leaving desperate teenagers to face the awakened Demon called Lilith.

=== February ===
One month into the new year, teenagers are left to fend for themselves as they realize that they not only need to out-live a plague, but each other as well.

=== April ===
After everyone on Earth over twenty dies, the awakened Demon called Lilith continues to spread her influence, while the teenagers chosen to stop her hope to unleash the power of an ancient encoded scroll.

=== May ===
In a world where turning twenty-one seems to mean certain death by a horrible Plague, the forces of the Demon Lilith and the Visionaries who believe in the Chosen One continue to be drawn west toward a final confrontation.

As the Demon Lilith continues to grow in strength, some of the world's teenage survivors worry about finding a cure for the plague that has killed all the adults, while others try to party themselves to death.

=== June ===
Left in a world with no adults, the teens subscribe to the notion that love will save them. They find out that they are wrong.

=== July ===
Is there a cure for the plague? Some think so and as Lilith grows in power they search for the cure.

=== August ===
Servants of Lilith fight against "The Visionaries" who attempt to decode an ancient scroll to stop her power.

=== September ===
The protagonists attempt to keep the power of the scroll from the demon Lilith—will they be successful?

=== October ===
As the demon wields ultimate power, one girl tries to save the world through the sacrifice of her own life—is it all in vain?

=== November ===
The demon has been destroyed... or has she? The Countdown is still on as the teens fight their way towards the end.

=== December ===
What will the future hold? Has the Countdown been stopped? Has the demon been destroyed? Only the final battle will decide.

== Criticism ==
While the series has amassed a large young-adult following, professional criticism of the book surrounded underdeveloped characters and the author's use of "crass" plot lines.

== Symbolism and Position ==
The series draws heavily upon common literary tropes and characters found in both religious texts and popular fiction, including the apocalyptic concept and the introduction of demonic forces.
