= WildStar (Image Comics) =

Image Comics publication and character

- WildStar Sky Zero trade paperback cover, art by Jerry Ordway & Al Gordon. Colour by Ruben Rude

Publication information
- Publisher: Image Comics
- First appearance: Wildstar: Sky Zero #1 (March 1993)
- Created by: Al Gordon and Jerry Ordway

In-story information
- Alter ego: Michael "Micky" Gabriel
- Notable aliases: SoulStar
- Abilities: Superhuman strength, invulnerability, alien-derived exo-membrane; able to discharge a force blast by short-circuiting the symbiote membrane's bio-circuit
WildStar: Sky Zero, WildStar
Publication information
- Format: Limited, ongoing
- Genre: Superhero
- No. of issues: 4 (vol. 1), 3 (vol. 2)

WildStar is a comic book series starring the superhero of the same name created by veteran comic book artist Al Gordon and published by Image Comics. The series began as a limited series titled WildStar: Sky Zero #1 (March 1993), providing the character's first appearance. This first limited series ran for four issues. The ongoing series WildStar followed the limited series before it was cancelled after 3 issues.

== Publication history ==
In 1993, the four-issue miniseries WildStar: Sky Zero was written, inked, and edited by Al Gordon. Jerry Ordway penciled the pages between other jobs for DC Comics. Gordon and Ordway found working together difficult because both men wanted more control over the final product, and because they lacked an editor to play middleman. At the same time, they dealt with frustrating trademark issues over the character's name. The series was lettered by John Workman. Erik Larsen's Savage Dragon character made an appearance in the third and fourth issues of the four-issue miniseries. The character WildStar also appeared in a few issues of The Savage Dragon, most recently as SoulStar. The coloring was done by Ruben Rude and Olyoptics.

Afterwards, a short-lived ongoing series titled WildStar, was written, inked and edited by Gordon, with Chris Marrinan penciling and John Workman lettering. The coloring of the series was also done by Ruben Rude and Olyoptics. Both series were published by Image Comics and were a part of their second wave.

Work began on a second miniseries with Chris Sprouse, including trading cards, pin-ups, and some interior artwork, but the project was abandoned by late 1995.

== Plot ==
=== WildStar: Sky Zero ===
The mini series, WildStar: Sky Zero revolves around a time loop that causes a future Micky Gabriel to keep repeating a section of time. In traveling back to the present to escape this endless repetition, Gabriel accidentally sets the time loop in motion. His future self gives the Micky Gabriel of the present the WildStar symbiote, an alien weapon which grants him a variety of superhuman abilities, as well as access to memories of the post-apocalyptic future from which the time displaced Gabriel hails. The original host of the symbiote was BloodStar, a barbaric alien warrior contracted by another alien race, the Ra'Zplarr, to invade the Earth of the future, as part of their quest for a certain "special" something seemingly endemic to certain Earth occupants.

=== Ongoing series ===
The ongoing series concentrated on the new timeline created during WildStar: Sky Zero, focusing on Micky Gabriel's reluctant association with the WildStar symbiote that contains the memories of a ravaged future Earth. The series reveals more of the devastated Earth's future history, but was canceled after three issues

HotWire and SkyLark, along with villains JumpStart and Blockade, all from the WildStar: Sky Zero miniseries, appear, as well as Mighty Man from Savage Dragon, and Freak Force.

== Powers and abilities ==
Micky Gabriel is empowered by the WildStar, a member of a non-sentient species known as the K'l Vann. The WildStar bonds with its host to become a distinct and integral part of the host's metabolism and then by default, it's psychology. It connects directly to the body functions that control glands and other bodily processes that chemically influence behavior. The symbiote then "eats" the body chemicals that result from the host's negative emotions. The host in turn is powered by the symbiote's alien chemistry resulting in its wearer being granted superhuman strength, the ability to leap tall buildings in a single bound, and substantial invulnerability. The symbiote's most devastating weapon in its alien arsenal is a force blast that is discharged by the wearer short-circuiting the symbiote membrane's bio-circuit epidermis.

== Appearances ==
- WildStar: Sky Zero #1–4
- WildStar: Sky Zero Trade Paperback. Reprints the miniseries with bonus extras.
- WildStar Ashcan Released to promote the ongoing series.
- WildStar #1–3 Released as an ongoing series and then canceled because of the market collapse.
- Savage Dragon #29, 41, 77, 103, 115, 120 (as SoulStar), 166, 167, 168, 172, 180, 188
- Savage Dragon Legacy Free Comic Book Day 2015 giveaway (reprints back-up from Savage Dragon #103)
- NewMen #14
- Sharky #4
- Youngblood (1992) #9
- Mars Attacks (Image)
- Two Wizard Magazine trading cards were produced.
- A single promotional trading card was released by Image Comics and distributed personally by Al Gordon and Jerry Ordway at conventions.
- A nine-card trading card series to promote WildStar: Sky Zero Zero: T Minus 1 was hand-distributed by the creators at comic conventions.

== Reception ==
The first series was highlighted by Wizard in its top pics feature "Picks from the Wizard's Hat". WildStar was well received in The Slings & Arrows Comic Guide, where Tim Pilcher called it "a nice little tale of superheroes of the future" with a surprise twist end. The original mini-series received a recommendation and was called "far superior" to the follow-on series.
