= The Presidents (TV series) =

- Narrated by: Edward Herrmann
- Country of origin: United States
- No. of episodes: 8

Production
- Executive producer: Craig Haffner
- Running time: 60 minutes

Original release
- Network: History Channel
- Release: January 18, 2005

The Presidents is a documentary television miniseries that aired on the History Channel in 2005. Based on the book To the Best of My Ability, the 8-episode series features profiles of presidents from George Washington to George W. Bush. The narrator is Edward Herrmann. The series was later released as a three DVD set, The Presidents: The Lives and Legacies of the 43 Leaders of the United States. The DVD release includes a ninth bonus episode, "All the Presidents' Wives".

== Summary ==
The show documents each of the Presidents in the union, starting with George Washington, following a chronological order to George W. Bush. Each President's segment begins with the narrator giving a brief dossier about each one, from their political affiliation, family, and notable traits. The show then highlights the history behind each presidency, linking each one to the following.

== Episodes ==
There were 8 episodes in the original television series on The History Channel, with a ninth bonus episode on DVD:

Episode	Presidents	Years
1	Washington to Monroe	1789–1825
2	J. Q. Adams to Polk	1825–1849
3	Taylor to Lincoln	1849–1865
4	A. Johnson to Arthur	1865–1885
5	Cleveland to Taft	1885–1913
6	Wilson to F. Roosevelt	1913–1945
7	Truman to Ford	1945–1977
8	Carter to Bush	1977–2008
9	The First Ladies (Bonus)	

== Reception ==
In a January 2005 review of The Presidents miniseries, David Kronke of the Los Angeles Daily News wrote, "Much of it is pretty standard American History 101, but the producers tend to manage a nice balance between figuring out what is generally known but too important to gloss over and keeping things tight and bright". Commending the use of "amusing trivial tidbits" about each president, Kronke also poked fun at the "budget-minded re-enactments" that were used to "jazz up the proceedings".

== Awards and nominations ==
The documentary was a finalist in two categories (Biography/Profiles and Writing) at the New York Festivals.

== DVD releases ==
It has been released onto DVD twice. First on May 31, 2005, and subsequently again on April 17, 2012 with an updated version. Re-aired, the final program includes the first term of Barack Obama, however, Edward Herrmann does not return as the narrator.

== See also ==
- List of programs broadcast by History (TV channel)
- History Channel
