= Just Imagine... =

Comic book line by DC Comics

- Cover to Just Imagine Stan Lee's Batman, art by Joe Kubert.

Publication information
- Publisher: DC Comics
- Schedule: Monthly
- Format: Miniseries
- Publication date: September 2001 -September 2002
- No. of issues: 13

Creative team
- Written by: Stan Lee
- Artist(s): John Buscema; Joe Kubert; Jim Lee; Dave Gibbons; Kevin Maguire; Jerry Ordway; John Byrne; Gary Frank; Scott McDaniel; Chris Bachalo; Walt Simonson; John Cassaday

Just Imagine... is a comic book line published by DC Comics. It was written by Stan Lee, co-creator of several popular Marvel Comics characters, in which he re-imagined DC superheroes, including Superman, Batman, Wonder Woman, Aquaman, Green Lantern, and the Flash.

== Development ==
In July 2000, it was reported Stan Lee had signed a deal with DC Comics to produce a 12 issue miniseries of one-shot Elseworlds taking place within a shared universe that would feature reinterpretations of established characters within the DC Universe before culminating in a final Crisis one-shot.

While the contract with Lee was for 12 issues, editor Mike Carlin said that depending on the sales for the books a 13th Secret Files and Origins issue might be produced. Michael E. Uslan, a longtime friend of Lee's and former executive of DC who still held sway with the company due to producing the Batman films, approached Lee about doing the series with Lee welcoming the opportunity. At the premiere of Batman in 1989, Uslan saw Lee and longtime friend Bob Kane talking and decided to approach the two wherein Lee said he would be interested in collaborating with Uslan on a big project someday.

According to Uslan, after watching Lee and Kane, this led to Uslan asking a hypothetical question of "what if Lee had been hired by DC instead of Marvel Comics?", but the nature of Lee's contract with Marvel prevented Uslan from pursuing this project at the time. When Toy Biz bought Marvel in the wake of the company's Bankruptcy in 1999, the company renegotiated Lee's contract with Marvel, and while Lee's salary was severely reduced it also allowed Lee to pursue freelance work outside the company such as establishing Stan Lee Media. After Uslan confirmed that Lee was no longer Marvel exclusive and was open to the idea of working for DC, Uslan met with then DC Comics President Paul Levitz, where he presented a two-page proposal for the project with Levitz enthused about the idea.

The announcement was met with a variety of reactions across the industry and the comic reading fan base with rumors initially circulating the project was Lee's revenge for having his role in Marvel pared down with Toy Biz executives embarrassed and furious with the announcement. Lee dismissed these rumors stating:

I'd never do anything to hurt Marvel, they’re family. You don’t do things to hurt your family.

The line-up of DC reinterpretations was initially supposed to include a new take on the Teen Titans to be drawn by Walt Simonson. Another reinterpretation to be announced but never come to fruition was a new take on the Legion of Super-Heroes. Alex Ross was approached to create cover art for the miniseries, but declined as he felt both the miniseries and The Dark Knight Strikes Again were the wrong direction for DC to take describing the events of overly gimmick focused and a sign of creative stagnation. The covers were instead provided by Adam Hughes. Mike Mignola was also supposed to contribute to the series, but had to drop out due to his work load. George Pérez was also initially announced as being slated to draw the final Crisis issue of the series.

== Batman ==
In Just Imagine Stan Lee with Joe Kubert - Creating Batman (October 2001), Batman is known as Wayne Williams instead of Bruce Wayne. Creators Stan Lee and Joe Kubert based this version on the characters created by Bob Kane and Bill Finger.

Unlike Bruce Wayne, Wayne Williams is African American. He is in excellent physical condition and has a vast personal fortune, allowing him access to custom equipment, including night vision lenses, a Kevlar costume, sensors to magnify sound, and a wingsuit/hang glider hybrid cape to glide.

Wayne Williams' father was a policeman who was killed in an ambush. Williams is framed for a crime and vows revenge on "Handz", the gang leader who set him up. In prison, Williams befriends a scientist named Frederick Grant, who teaches him how to "develop his mind", as well as sewing and bodybuilding.

Williams learns that his mother has also died while he is incarcerated, and he blames Handz for her death. After rescuing a warden during a prison riot, he is given a full pardon. After his release, Williams is on the run from Handz and keeps a low profile by shaving his head. Williams needs money, so he becomes a wrestler under the name of Batman, never unmasking in public. In a few short weeks, Batman becomes a superstar in wrestling and attains extreme wealth. He searches for Grant and entrusts him with his secret identity. Williams has the money, skill, and strength to fight Handz, but Frederick Grant has the technical know-how, so the two become partners. To keep a low profile, Williams gives Frederick a mansion and acts as his bodyguard. Batman eventually finds and fights with Handz, who accidentally falls to his death in the conflict. No longer seeking vengeance, Batman begins a mission of justice to fight crime and protect the innocent from villains like Handz.

== Wonder Woman ==
Wonder Woman, whose real name is Maria Mendoza, debuted in Just Imagine Stan Lee with Jim Lee Creating Wonder Woman (October 2001). Creators Stan Lee and Jim Lee based this version on the original DC character created by William Moulton Marston.

Mendoza is an activist who protests against the corporate excavation of an ancient Incan holy site near her village. The CEO Armando Guitez has a plan: gain power from the site and take over the world. When Mendoza's father is kidnapped by the CEO and taken to the excavation, Maria follows, only to arrive too late to prevent her father's death. Guitez gains demonic powers from artifacts at the site, and then travels to Los Angeles. Mendoza finds the staff of Manco Cápac, granting her the powers of the Incan sun god, and uses them to pursue and defeat Guitez. She then decides to remain in Los Angeles, taking the name Wonder Woman.

== Superman ==
Superman, whose real name is Salden, debuted in Just Imagine Stan Lee with John Buscema Creating Superman (November 2001). Creators Stan Lee and John Buscema based this version on the characters created by Jerry Siegel and Joe Shuster.

Salden's powers include great strength and immaculate speed, but was considered the weakest member of the Kryptonian Police Force. He uses a flying harness to capture a dangerous criminal in a teleportation lab, but the criminal sends Salden and himself on a one-way trip to Earth. The two men arrive separately, both discovering that they have enhanced physical abilities. The criminal sets himself up as the king of a jungle tribe before eventually confronting Salden.

Earth is too primitive, but it has the potential to develop the technology that Salden needs to return to his home world. The problem is that there are too many obstacles to the peaceful future necessary for technological advancement: war, crime, poverty, etc. Salden decides to become a superhero in order to rid the world of these impediments and calls himself Superman.

== Green Lantern ==
Green Lantern, real name Len Lewis, debuted in Just Imagine Stan Lee and Dave Gibbons Creating Green Lantern (December 2001). Creators Stan Lee and Dave Gibbons based this version on the original character created by Martin Nodell and Bill Finger.

A professor is looking for something called "the Tree", mentioned in Norse legends as Yggdrasil and in Christianity as the Tree of Knowledge of Good and Evil. He finally traces the plant to an area in Africa. When he finds the Tree, agents working for the Reverend Dominic Darrk (who appears in all 13 issues of Just Imagine), the leader of the Church of Eternal Empowerment, who are also searching for the Tree, shoot him and leave him for dead. The Tree shows the professor its history, which includes a race of pre-humans, and grants him its power to "serve as a light in these dark times".

== The Flash ==
The Flash, real name Mary Maxwell, debuted in Just Imagine Stan Lee and Kevin Maguire Creating Flash (January 2002). Creators Stan Lee and Kevin Maguire based this version on the original character created by Gardner Fox and Harry Lampert.

A typical college girl whose father is a scientist, Mary's life was very dull, and she longs to be a superhero like in the comic books she reads. She also has a life-threatening disease that slowly drains her energy. One day, enemies from her father's past, who are part of an organization named STEALTH (Special Team of Espionage Agents Licensed to Target and Hit), find and kill him. Before he dies, though, he injects Mary with the DNA of a hummingbird to save her from her wasting disease. This grants her the ability to travel at super-speed and she calls herself the Flash.

== JLA ==
Lee's version of the Justice League debuted in Just Imagine Stan Lee and Jerry Ordway Creating JLA (February 2002). Each titular character of the previous five issues serve as the members.

Darrk is trying to summon a being called Crisis to Earth so that he can take over the planet. To this end, he creates some henchmen in the form of the Doom Patrol, consisting of Blockbuster, Parasite, and Deathstroke. Darrk's young son Adam Strange notifies Superman, Batman, Wonder Woman, Green Lantern, and the Flash of Darrk's intentions. Darrk, beaten by the five heroes, mortally wounds Adam and flees, bluffed into doing so by Green Lantern, who (unbeknownst to Darrk) is too weak to fight because his strength has been drained by the Parasite. Adam has powers too, and promises the heroes that he will return in some form. He then dies and the heroes officially become the Justice League.

== Secret Files and Origins ==
Just Imagine Stan Lee...Secret Files and Origins (March 2002) contains the story "The Coming Crisis", where the National Exposer interviews the members of the Justice League. They explain their origins and warn Earth of Darrk's threat. Wonder Woman gets a hint of the League's future.

The issue also contains profiles of each hero, Darrk, and the Church of Eternal Empowerment.

== Robin ==
Stan Lee's version of Robin, co-created with John Byrne, is an embittered teenager who works for Darrk. Darrk sends Robin out on various assignments, all the while promising him something in return; the book opens with Robin attempting his current assignment: kill the Batman.

== Shazam! ==
Lee re-imagines the original Captain Marvel/Shazam! premise by having the hero be a mild-mannered Interpol agent, Robert Rogers. Teamed with the beautiful, and much tougher, fellow agent Carla Noral, the two of them are in India searching for the megalomaniacal master criminal Gunga Kahn. This version is co-created with Gary Frank and is based on the Bill Parker–C. C. Beck character.

In a back-up story plotted by Michael E. Uslan, scripted by Lee and Uslan and drawn by Kano, an orphaned American boy in India, at the same time as the adventures of Shazam, heroically saves a village from starvation with the help of a local boy named Zubin Navotny. The boy's name is Billy Marvel and he and Zubin are made honorary captains in the Peace Corps by an ambassador named Batson, thus making the boy "Captain Marvel".

== Aquaman ==
Marine biologist Ramon Raymond is experimenting with dolphin DNA to see if humans can live underwater and decides to use himself as a test subject. When he swims through a glowing patch of seawater, he finds he can now transform into a being of living water. This version is co-created with Scott McDaniel and is based on the Mort Weisinger-Paul Norris character.

== Catwoman ==
Supermodel Joanie Jordan and her cat Ebony are struck by strange green lightning, creating a link between them and giving Jordan catlike abilities, including super-agility, heightened senses, and razor-sharp claws. This version is co-created with Chris Bachalo and is based on the Bob Kane/Bill Finger character.

== Sandman ==
On a crewed mission to investigate Saturn's largest moon Titan, astronaut Col. Larry Wilton is out on a spacewalk when his tether is cut by his traitorous colleague, Maj. Bryan Bleier. Left for dead, Wilton drifts into a mysterious green cloud and finds himself in a bizarre realm that he had dreamt of as a child. It is here that a beautiful girl named Melana grants him the powers of the Sandman. This version is co-created with Walt Simonson and is based on the Gardner Fox-Allen Bert Christman character.

== Crisis ==
Crisis debuted in Just Imagine Stan Lee with John Cassaday Creating Crisis (September 2002).

When one of the Inca hawk runes is stolen, Wonder Woman summons all of Earth's new heroes. The Sandman arrives with Darrk's body and warns them that Crisis—now Darrk's master—is coming. Worse still, the Justice League has a traitor in their midst.

In this issue, which is the end of the story, there are other versions of some of DC's other characters: the Oracle, the Phantom Stranger, Hawkman, and the Atom.

== Collected editions ==
1. Just Imagine Stan Lee Creating the DC Universe Book 1 (2004-01-01/2020-03-11): includes Just Imagine Stan Lee with Dave Gibbons Creating Green Lantern #1, Just Imagine Stan Lee with Jerry Ordway Creating JLA #1, Just Imagine Stan Lee with Jim Lee Creating Wonder Woman #1, Just Imagine Stan Lee with Joe Kubert Creating Batman #1, Just Imagine Stan Lee with John Buscema Creating Superman #1, and Just Imagine Stan Lee with Kevin Maguire Creating The Flash #1.
2. Just Imagine Stan Lee Creating the DC Universe Book 2 (2004-06-09/2020-12-30): includes Just Imagine Stan Lee with John Byrne Creating Robin #1, Just Imagine Stan Lee with Gary Frank Creating Shazam! #1, Just Imagine Stan Lee with Scott McDaniel Creating Aquaman #1, Just Imagine Stan Lee with Chris Bachalo Creating Catwoman #1, Just Imagine Stan Lee with Walter Simonson Creating the Sandman #1, and Just Imagine Stan Lee with John Cassaday Creating Crisis #1.
3. Just Imagine Stan Lee Creating the DC Universe Book 3 (2004-06-09): Includes Aquaman, Sandman (with Walter Simonson), Catwoman (with Chris Bachalo), Crisis (with John Cassaday).
4. Just Imagine Stan Lee Creating the DC Universe Omnibus (2013-12-11): Includes Book 1, Book 2, and Book 3.
