= Countdown (novel) =

2014 novel by Natalie Standiford

- First edition
- Author: Natalie Standiford
- Series: Unstoppable
- Published: April 29, 2014
- Publisher: Scholastic
- Preceded by: Breakaway
- Followed by: Flashpoint

Countdown is the third book in the Unstoppable series of The 39 Clues franchise. It was written by Natalie Standiford, and published on April 29, 2014. The cover features a broken Mayan artifact, as the book primarily takes place in Tikal, Guatemala.

The back of the book states

"Life or Death: The clock has run out for thirteen year-old Dan Cahill. As head of the most powerful family the world has ever known, he and his older sister, Amy, have been in the crosshairs for too long. Dan and Amy have always managed to stay a step ahead of their enemies, but it was only a matter of time until luck failed them. Now Dan is hopelessly trapped and nothing can save him. Nothing except unleashing an evil into the world even worse than the enemies closing in. As Dan hovers between life and death, Amy has a terrifying decision to makes. Just how far is she willing to go to save her little brother?"

== Plot ==
In London, England, J. Rutherford Pierce meets with the Queen of the United Kingdom. However, his wife Debi Ann curtsies when Pierce told her not to, and Pierce later breaks one of the Queen's teacups while experiencing a tremor due to the serum. He tries to turn the mishap to his favor by saying that the teacup was too old and that it was time that the Queen got new china. However, the Queen is not pleased. Pierce reflect on how the Cahills are his last opponent to world domination, and vows to kill them. In Guatemala City, Guatemala, the Cahills and Rosenblooms are at the La Aurora International Airport. However, they see paparazzi who are sent by Pierce who publicize their every move. As they escape, they hear rude remarks from the paparazzi and passengers at the airport alike. They escape to their waiting chopper, and make a close escape. They see that Pierce's soldiers are after them, too- their orders are to kills the Cahills but to make it look like an accident. The soldiers' breath smells like green kale mixed with chlorine and ammonia. After the chopper takes off, one of Pierce's men jumped extremely high, due to the serum. The chopper is on its way to Tikal, where the kids have to look for riven crystal in order to complete the antidote to the serum Pierce and his thugs have taken. Dan, Atticus, and Jake are all ignoring Amy because of how she left them behind while embarking on a dangerous mission.

Amy also told Jake, her former boyfriend, how she had never loved him. Amy decides that she would rather have her loved ones "angry and alive than dead". Amy also hears the clink of the serum that Sammy Mourad had made for her, just in case. As the groups discusses the riven crystal and Tikal, a national park and archaeological treasure uncovered in 1956, the chopper suddenly shakes. The pilot, who is wearing a parachute, had been hired by Pierce to jump out and crash the helicopter, in an attempt to kill the Cahills. The group finally fights off the pilot, and Amy takes the controls. She unsteadily flies it to Tikal, where the chopper falls thirty vertical feet onto a pok-a-tok court. Miraculously, the groups survives with few injuries. A ranger picks them up and tells them information about Tikal. At their hotel room, the kids ask Pony to do a search on Debi Ann, who is a Cahill. Later, Atticus uses Olivia Cahill's book to find out the location of the riven crystal. Meanwhile, in Trilon Laboratories in Delaware, Nellie Gomez, acting as Nadine Gormey, makes contact with Sammy Mourad, who is being held in the building to improve the serum for Pierce. In Attleboro, Massachusetts, Pony works on getting information about Debi Ann, though it is difficult. Meanwhile, in Tikal, as the group is searching for the crystal, Pierce's thugs ambushes them, and Dan nearly dies. Amy takes the serum in order to save Dan, but now she only has a week to live. In Delaware, Dr. Brent Beckelheimer is trying to expose Nellie as a fraud, but she uses pictures of his gnoming hobby in order to portray him as unstable. Meanwhile, Amy is experiencing side effects that will soon kill her.

As events progress, Nellie discovers that Jeffrey Callendar is experimenting on Fiske Cahill. In Tikal, Hamilton, Atticus, Ian, and Jonah try to find out if Amy and Dan have recovered Olivia's book, and try to find the riven crystal. Nellie tells Pony to warn Amy and Dan that they are heading into a trap. However, even though the riven crystal is found, Dan is abducted, Pony is killed by Pierce's thugs, and Nellie and Sammy are captured.
