= Time Machine: Beyond The Da Vinci Code =

Beyond The Da Vinci Code is a The History Channel special TV program, which challenges Dan Brown’s best-selling historical novel, The Da Vinci Code. The program was produced by Tom Quinn of Weller/Grossman Productions in Los Angeles, directed by Will Ehbrecht and premiered in HD format in January 2005.
