= Decoding the Past =

Television series

Decoding the Past (2005–2008) is a History Channel paranormal television series that "decodes" the past by looking for unusual, and mysterious things written throughout history that may give clues as to what will happen in the future.

== Episodes ==
=== Season 1 ===
No. overall	No. in season	Title	Original release date
1	1	"Godfathers"	2005
2	2	" Behind The DaVinci Code"	July 25, 2005
3	3	" Nostradamus: 500 Years Later (Part 1)"	August 1, 2005
4	4	" Nostradamus: 500 Years Later (Part 2)"	August 8, 2005
5	5	" Countdown to Armageddon (Part 1)"	August 22, 2005
6	6	" Countdown to Armageddon (Part 2)"	August 29, 2005
7	7	" The Shroud of Turin"	September 5, 2005
8	8	" The Bible Code: Predicting Armageddon"	September 12, 2005
9	9	" The Bible Code II: Apocalypse and Beyond"	September 19, 2005
10	10	" Resurrection"	September 26, 2005
11	11	" Apocalypse"	October 3, 2005
12	12	" Secret Societies"	October 3, 2005
13	13	" Nazi Prophecies"	October 10, 2005
14	14	" Presidential Prophecies"	October 24, 2005
15	15	" The Search for John the Baptist"	October 28, 2005
16	16	" Rommel: The Doubter"	October 30, 2005
17	17	" The Templar Code: Crusade of Secrecy"	November 7, 2005
18	18	" The Templar Code: The Quest for Templar Treasure"	November 14, 2005
19	19	" Cults"	November 21, 2005
20	20	" The Other Nostradamus"	November 28, 2005
21	21	" The Holy Grail"	December 3, 2005
22	22	" Visions of Mary"	December 3, 2005
23	23	" The Oracle of Delphi Secrets Revealed"	December 3, 2005
24	24	" Judas: Traitor or Friend?"	December 3, 2005
25	25	" Biblical Disasters"	December 4, 2005
26	26	" Mysteries of the Bermuda Triangle"	December 8, 2005
27	27	" The Search for Noah's Ark"	December 12, 2005
28	28	" Prophecies of Israel"	December 12, 2005
29	29	" Relics of the Passion"	December 19, 2005
30	30	" Unraveling the Shroud"	December 19, 2005
31	31	" Prophecies of Iraq"	December 28, 2005

=== Season 2 ===
No. overall	No. in season	Title	Original release date
32	1	"Bible Mysteries"	January 9, 2006
33	2	"Mysteries of the High Seas"	January 23, 2006
34	3	"Opus Dei Unveiled"	January 26, 2006
35	4	"The Doomsday Clock"	January 29, 2006
36	5	"Prophecies, Miracles & Mystics"	January 29, 2006
37	6	"Prophecies"	January 29, 2006
38	7	"Cover-Up?"	January 30, 2006
39	8	"Monsters"	February 6, 2006
40	9	"Lost Worlds"	February 16, 2006
41	10	"Secrets of the Koran (Part 1)"	March 2, 2006
42	11	"Secrets of the Koran (Part 2)"	March 2, 2006
43	12	"Secret Brotherhood of Freemasons"	March 23, 2006
44	13	"The Abominable Snowman"	March 28, 2006
45	14	"Hitler and the Occult"	April 3, 2006
46	15	"Disaster of Napoleon's Fleet"	April 3, 2006
47	16	"The Real Dracula"	April 4, 2006
48	17	"Sodom & Gomorrah"	April 5, 2006
49	18	"The End of the World"	April 23, 2006
50	19	"666: The Sign of Evil"	May 13, 2006
51	20	"Angels: Good or Evil"	May 13, 2006
52	21	"Heaven and Hell"	May 16, 2006
53	22	"Fatima Secrets Unveiled"	June 1, 2006
54	23	"The Antichrist: Zero Hour"	June 6, 2006
55	24	"Monsters of the Sea"	June 8, 2006
56	25	"The Ten Commandments"	June 13, 2006
57	26	"Giganto: The Real King Kong"	June 15, 2006
58	27	"Strange Behavior"	July 15, 2006
59	28	"Countdown to Armageddon"	July 22, 2006
60	29	"Secrets of the Dollar Bill"	July 27, 2006
61	30	"The Ten Commandments"	July 27, 2006
62	31	"Mysteries of the Freemasons: America"	August 1, 2006
63	32	"Mayan Doomsday Prophecy"	August 3, 2006
64	33	"Secrets of the Playing Card"	September 14, 2006
65	34	"The Real Doctor Frankenstein"	October 26, 2006
66	35	"The Real Sorcerer's Stone"	November 16, 2006
67	36	"Seven Wonders of the World"	December 7, 2006
68	37	"Secrets of Kabbalah"	December 17, 2006
69	38	"The Spear of Christ"	December 21, 2006

=== Season 3 ===
No. overall	No. in season	Title	Original release date
70	1	"Cults: Dangerous Devotion"	January 4, 2007
71	2	"Vampire Secrets"	January 18, 2007
72	3	"Tibetan Book of the Dead"	January 25, 2007
73	4	"Exorcism: Driving Out the Devil"	February 10, 2007
74	5	"Doomsday 2012: The End of Days"	March 1, 2007
75	6	"Earth's Black Hole"	March 15, 2007
76	7	"Mysteries of the Freemasons"	March 22, 2007
77	8	"Mysteries of the Garden of Eden"	April 24, 2007
78	9	"Decoding the Garden of Eden"	June 23, 2007

=== Season 4 ===
No. overall	No. in season	Title	Original release date
79	1	"Siberian Apocalypse"	January 27, 2008
80	2	"The Abominable Snowman"	October 2, 2008
