= Slay Anything =

- Legends of Tomorrow episode
- Episode no.: Season 5 Episode 3
- Directed by: Alexandra La Roche
- Written by: Matthew Maala & Tyron B. Carter
- Production code: T13.21903
- Original air date: February 11, 2020

Guest appearances
- Shayan Sobhian as Behrad Tarazi; Adam Tsekhman as Gary Green; Seth Meriwether as Freddy Meyers; Beth Riesgraf as Kathy Meyers

Episode chronology
← Previous "Miss Me, Kiss Me, Love Me"	Next → "A Head of Her Time"
- Legends of Tomorrow (season 5)

"Slay Anything" is the third episode of the fifth season and 71st overall of the American science fiction television series Legends of Tomorrow, revolving around the eponymous team of superheroes and their time travelling adventures. It is set in the Arrowverse, sharing continuity with the other television series of the universe. The episode was written by Matthew Maala and Tyron B. Carter, and directed by Alexandra La Roche.

Caity Lotz stars as Sara Lance, and is joined by principal cast members Tala Ashe, Jes Macallan, Nick Zano, Matt Ryan, Brandon Routh, Dominic Purcell, Olivia Swann, Courtney Ford, Maisie Richardson-Sellers, and Amy Louise Pemberton.

== Plot ==
Freddy Meyers is executed for murder but is resurrected by Astra Logue.

Meanwhile Constantine and Gary leave the Waverider to find a solution to the encore problem they go to Constantine's house and find ex-Legend, Charlie. Back on the Waverider, Ray Palmer believes the Encores can be stopped by reforming them in the past. However the Legends dismiss the idea and intend to simply catch Freddy.

Sara Lance, Mick Rory and Ava Sharpe head to 2004 to stop Freddy. Mick reveals that he went to the school and meets with his ex-girlfriend Ali. However they are unsuccessful when Freddy kills Tiffany. The rest of the Legends go to 1989 to try Ray's idea.

In 1989 while the Legends are planning Nora Darhk is pulled to Freddy to become his fairy godmother and fix his prom night. At prom the Legends find evidence of a prank that Freddy's date Tiffany, and a jock were going to pull, but the former has a change of heart and gets the latter to confess.

Freddy storms out of the prom. Nora follows him and the two of them talk it out prompting Freddy to wish for the chance to perform a dance number to show his "true self". This plan works out and him and Tiffany begin to actually fall for each other. Back on the Waverider, Zari Tarazi has flashes of Zari Tomaz's memories, she uses Tomaz's hacker experience to escape the Waverider just as the real killer attacks the prom.

In 04' the real killer kills Ali. Mick then attacks them with his Heat Gun but they stops the fire and redirects it killing Mick. Back in '89 the killer attacks Freddy and Tiffany. To Freddy's horror, the killer is revealed to be his overly-possessive mother Kathy, whose crime he took the fall for in the original timeline. Behrad manages to knock her out, undoing her damage and causing her to disappear in 2004 just as she was about to murder Ava and Sara and resurrecting all her victims. The Legends reunite in the '04 reunion and they discover that Freddy and Tiffany got married. Mick reconnects with Ali and the two of them have sex.

Meanwhile, Constantine resorts to desperate measures to stop Astra's Encores by facing her mother's ghost. When he returns to his house he plans to abandon this plan. Charlie encourages him and he follows through with the plan and enters the room.

== Production ==
"Slay Anything" was written by Matthew Maala and Tyron B. Carter. Maala and Carter finished the production draft of the script on July 30, the blue revisions were then completed on August 1. The Full Pink draft was finished on August 5 and the final version, the yellow revisions, was completed on August 6. The mention of the "Newcastle Gang" is a reference to the NBC series Constantine, where Matt Ryan's John Constantine originated. This line helped establish the continuation of Constantine's original storyline, which was left unfinished due to the show's abrupt cancellation. The episode was written as an homage to the slasher genre.

"Slay Anything" was directed by Alexandra La Roche. Preparation on the episode started July 26, 2019 and ended August 6. Filming began the next day and ended on the 19th of the same month.

=== Casting ===
The episode stars Caity Lotz, Tala Ashe, Jes Macallan, Nick Zano, Matt Ryan, Brandon Routh, Dominic Purcell, Amy Louise Pemberton, Courtney Ford, and Maisie Richardson-Sellers as Sara Lance, Zari Tarazi, Nate Haywood, John Constantine, Ray Palmer, Mick Rory, Gideon (voice), Nora Darhk, and Charlie. Shayan Sobhian and Adam Tsekhman reprise their recurring roles as Behrad Tarazi and Gary Green respectively. Seth Meriwether appears as Freddy Meyers. The character's name is an amalgamation of popular slasher film characters Freddy Kruger and Michael Myers.

== Release ==
=== Broadcast ===
"Slay Anything" was first aired in the United States on The CW on February 11, 2020. It was watched by 0.74 million people with a 0.2 share among adults 18–49.

=== Critical reception ===
"Slay Anything" was met with mixed reviews from critics. Jim Dandeneau of Den of Geek rated the episode a 3/5. Dandeneau called said that the episode "wasn't very good" and called it "mediocre". Despite this, Dandeneau claimed that this episode convinced him that Legends of Tomorrow is his favorite show. He finished his review with saying that even mediocre Legends episodes were still fun and worth watching. The A.V. Club's Allison Shoemaker gave it "Top Pick" status and in her review, she rated the episode a "A-".
