= Beebo the God of War =

- Legends of Tomorrow episode
- Beebo at the Viking shrine
- Episode no.: Season 3 Episode 9
- Directed by: Kevin Mock
- Written by: Grainne Godfree; James Eagan
- Production code: T13.20609
- Original air date: December 5, 2017

Guest appearances
- Neal McDonough as Damien Dahrk; Wentworth Miller as Leo Snart; Courtney Ford as Nora Darhk; Graeme McComb as Martin Stein; John Noble as the voice of Mallus; Jes Macallan as Ava Sharpe; Thor Knai as Leif Erikson; Katia Winter as Freydís Eiríksdóttir; Matt Ryan as John Constantine (uncredited)

Episode chronology
← Previous "Crisis on Earth-X, Part 4"	Next → "Daddy Darhkest"
- Legends of Tomorrow season 3

"Beebo the God of War" is the ninth episode and mid-season finale of the third season of the American science-fiction television series Legends of Tomorrow. It is also the forty-second episode overall. The episode was released on The CW on December 5, 2017. The series revolves around an eponymous team of superheroes and their time-traveling adventures.

At the beginning of the episode, the Legends mourn the loss of fellow member Martin Stein, following his death in the previous episode. Later in the episode, a younger version of Stein and a stuffed doll are sent to Vinland in the year 1000 CE, captured by Vikings, and rescued by the Legends.

"Beebo the God of War" was written by Grainne Godfree and James Eagan, and was directed by Kevin Mock. The episode was the third-most-viewed of the season and was positively reviewed by critics. Franz Drameh stars as Jefferson Jackson, in his final regular appearance as a series regular.

== Plot ==
After the death of Martin Stein in the previous episode, the episode opens with a younger version of Stein buying a popular children's toy named Beebo for his daughter. The store reveals that they are out of dolls, but Stein finds the last one and is chased by a crowd of people who are upset at him for his find, before disappearing.

The Legends are alerted to a change in the timeline, the result of which Vikings conquer America. They also learn that the younger version of Stein has been transported to a Viking colony in Vinland in the year 1000 CE, where he is found by Leif Erikson. The Legends conclude that Stein and the Beebo doll caused the change in the timeline. The Vikings begin to revere Beebo as a god.

The Legends bring Stein onto the Waverider, their time machine, and he notices his future self is missing. Jax attempts to inform Stein of his upcoming death but Nate stops him. Sara calls Time Bureau director Ava Sharpe. She asks Ava to assist with the change in the timeline, and Ava complies.

The Legends party with the Vikings. Mick Rory tries to steal mead from an altar to Beebo, leading the Vikings to attempt to burn him alive, but Leo Snart rescues him. The Vikings then find Nate and Zari in the process of stealing Beebo. The Vikings attack, and in the fight Beebo is thrown into the air where Mick melts the doll using his Heat Gun. The Vikings proclaim Beebo a false god and prepare to leave Vinland. Damien and Nora Darhk arrive, and claim that Damien is Odin. The Legends then flee to the Waverider. Ava is contacted by the Time Bureau, who order her to return. The Legends attack and defeat Damien, but in the process Sara is briefly sent into an alternative dimension where she hears the voice of Mallus, the season's primary antagonist.

Jax attempts to save Stein's life by providing him with a note containing the details of his death. Stein destroys the note to help Jax accept his death, prompting Jax to leave the Legends. Sara then boards the Waverider and finds John Constantine, who asks for the assistance of the Legends.

== Production ==
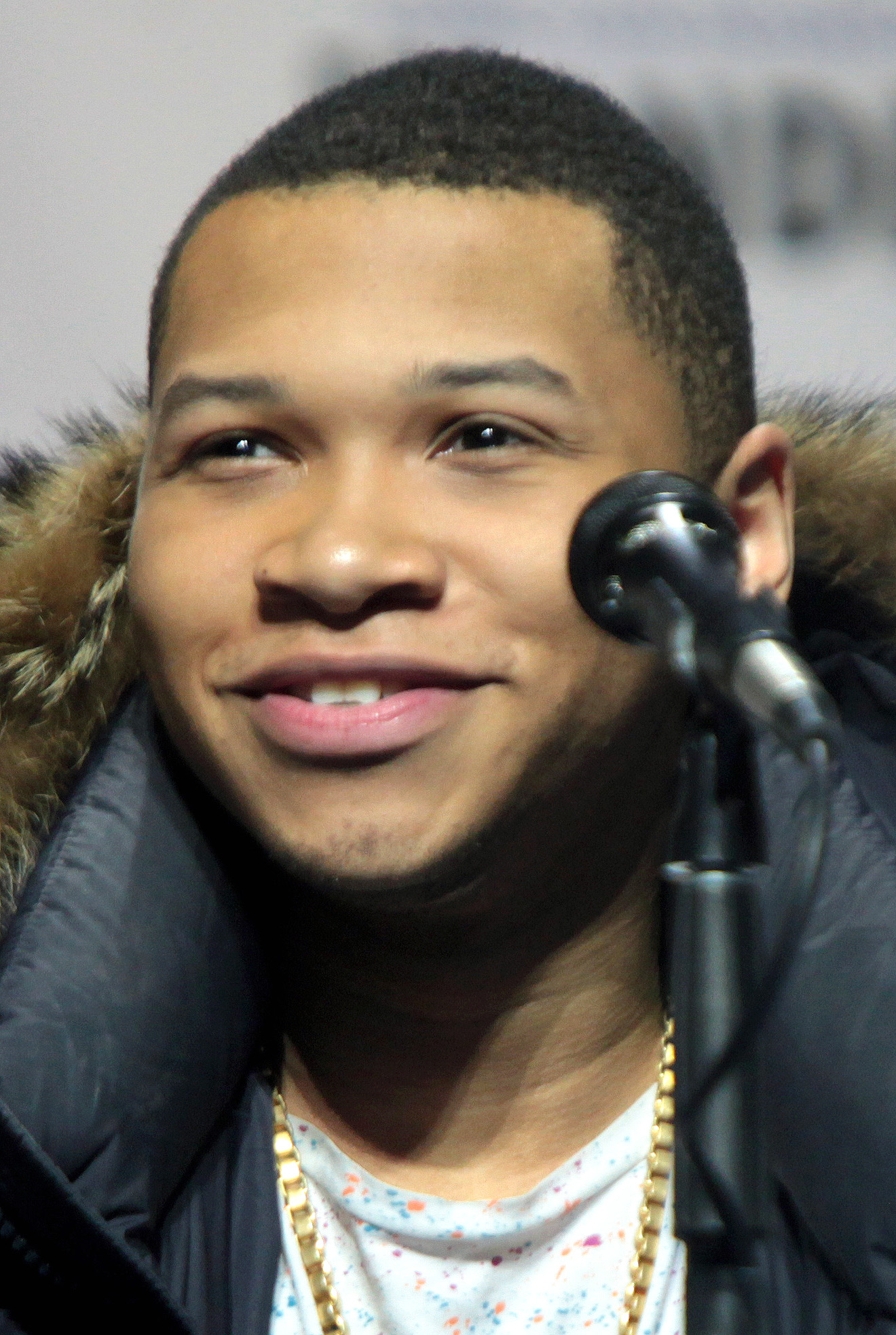
Franz Drameh stars in the episode as Jefferson Jackson, marking his final appearance as a series regular.

"Beebo the God of War" was written by Grainne Godfree and James Eagan, and directed by Kevin Mock. The first draft of the script was completed on October 3, 2017, allowing pre-production to begin the same day. Pre-production ended on October 12 with the final draft of the script being issued the same day. Filming began on October 13 and continued through October 25.

In a promotional video for the episode, showrunner Phil Klemmer described the premise of the episode as the Vikings pursuing the worship of Beebo, whom they believe to be a pagan god, over Christianity, causing them to continue "charging across the new world" instead of returning to Scandinavia. Klemmer explained the title as being a reference to the Norse setting.

The character of Beebo takes inspiration from Tickle Me Elmo. During a panel at a fan convention in Vancouver, Canada, the show's cast said that Beebo represents an attempt by the writers to introduce further chaos into the series' plot. They stated they were worried audiences could perceive Beebo's inclusion as "jumping the shark". Speaking with ComicBook.com, Benjamin Diskin explained that the initial idea for the character was "nothing but a smile and a catchphrase"; Diskin was surprised by the success of the character. Beebo was well received by audiences and was featured in a spin-off Christmas special titled Beebo Saves Christmas.

=== Casting ===
The episode stars Franz Drameh as Jefferson Jackson / Firestorm, alongside main cast members Caity Lotz as Sara Lance / White Canary, Tala Ashe as Zari Tomaz, Nick Zano as Nate Heywood / Steel, Brandon Routh as Ray Palmer / The Atom, Amy Louise Pemberton (voice) as Gideon, Dominic Purcell as Mick Rory / Heatwave, and Maisie Richardson-Sellers as Amaya Jiwe / Vixen.

"Beebo the God of War" is the first episode of Legends of Tomorrow not to feature Victor Garber as a series regular due to the death of his character, Martin Stein, in the previous episode, although a younger version of Stein played by Graeme McComb appears. McComb previously portrayed this version of the character in "Pilot" (2016) and "Compromised" (2016). This episode is the final appearance of Drameh as a series regular. While Garber's departure was a personal decision, Drameh's was a creative choice by the writers.

The guest cast includes Jes Macallan as Ava Sharpe, Matt Ryan as John Constantine, Courtney Ford as Nora Darhk, Neal McDonough as Damien Darhk, Wentworth Miller as Leo Snart, John Noble as the voice of Mallus, Thor Knai as Leif Erikson, Katia Winter as Freydís Eiríksdóttir, and Benjamin Diskin as the voice of Beebo. Ryan reprises his role from the canceled NBC television series Constantine, which was retroactively made part of the Arrowverse after he guest-starred in the Arrow season four episode "Haunted". Ryan later joined the main cast in the fourth season of Legends of Tomorrow. Both Winter and Drameh would return in the season three finale "The Good, the Bad and the Cuddly".

== Release ==
"Beebo the God of War" was first aired in the United States on The CW on December 5, 2017. The episode's original broadcast attracted 1.61 million viewers, and it received a 0.6/2 share among adults ages 18–49. This was 1.2 million fewer viewers than the previous episode, but up 100 thousand from the following one. "Beebo the God of War" placed fifth in its time slot, behind The Mick, Black-ish, SEAL Team, and Will & Grace. The episode was the third-most-viewed Legends episode of the season. When factoring in seven-day DVR viewership, the episode received an additional one million viewers, totaling 2.61 million viewers.

On September 25, 2018, the episode was released on both DVD and Blu-ray as a part of the Legends of Tomorrow season-three box set.

== Reception ==
=== Critical response ===
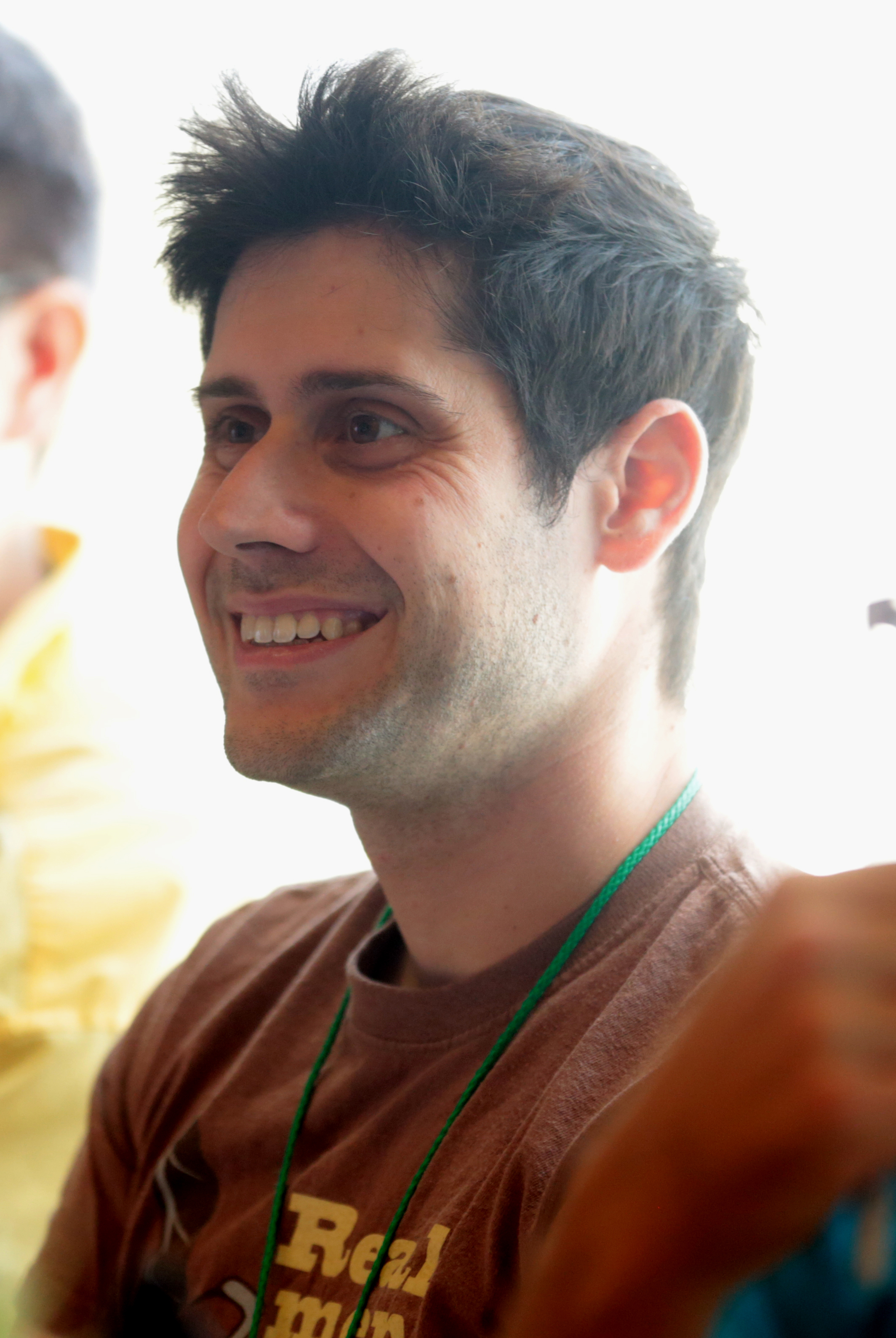
Ben Diskin voices the titular Beebo. The character was praised by critics.

"Beebo the God of War" received positive critical reviews, which praised the episode's humor and the sad ending. The A.V. Club's Oliver Sava rated the episode an "A−" and praised its use of Damien Darhk, stating that while he had grown bored of the character, Damien's appearance was well executed. He also stated that the episode successfully blends comedic and serious moments, particularly the grief over Stein's death, and that it helps the "family dynamic" of the Legends. In a review for Den of Geek, Jim Dandeneau rated the episode 4.5 out of 5, and said that while he found the episode hilarious, he was emotionally impacted by the departure of Jax in the final moments. Writing for Entertainment Weekly, Shirley Li praised the episode for providing closure for Jax and Stein, describing it as a good example of the reason the time-travel genre works, and saying it "accomplished something special". Jesse Schedeen of IGN rated the episode 9.8 of 10 and described it as a great follow-up to the tragic ending of the previous episode. Scheedeen said the episode is both very silly and incredibly heartfelt, and that the only problem he had with the episode is the minimal role of Mallus.

In a 2020 ranking of the series' best episodes for Gizmodo, Beth Elderkin placed "Beebo the God of War" sixth. Elderkin said the episode tells a "great story" and marks a turning point for Legends of Tomorrow.

=== Beebo ===
Fans and critics have praised Beebo. During the series, the character returned multiple times in different forms, such as a giant toy in "The Good, the Bad, and the Cuddly", and as a magical manifestation in "Crisis on Infinite Earths: Part Five" (2021). He also appears as a doll in two episodes of Legends of Tomorrow's parent shows: the Arrow episode "Level Two" and The Flash episode "The Elongated Knight Rises". Beebo features on the cover of both the DVD and Blu-ray editions of the box set "Legends of Tomorrow: The Complete Series".

Beebo returns in the spin-off Christmas special Beebo Saves Christmas (2021), which was positively received by critics. The special aired on The CW on December 21, 2021; it was narrated by Victor Garber and features Diskin in the title role.

== Analysis ==
"Beebo the God of War" includes tones of grief and sadness, which it pairs with a light-hearted and "goofy" vibe. IGN's Jesse Schedeen noted the similarities in tone between the episode and the previous season-three episode "Return of the Mack". The Legends mourn Martin Stein in various ways. Sara refuses to allow the Legends to be involved in the attack against Damien Darhk, fearing they might be harmed. Leo Snart hosts a therapy session for the Legends, though his efforts are unappreciated. Jax attempts to save Stein's life by providing him a letter detailing his death. Stein opts to destroy the note and instead helps Jax accept his loss. Entertainment Weekly's Shirley Li noted how the nature of the death is unique for the series because it occurred at the hands of an unnamed character who is almost immediately killed. Without a named killer, there is nobody to blame or feel anger towards, unlike the deaths of Damien Dahrk and Reverse Flash.

Some critics have considered "Beebo the God of War" a turning point for the series. Writing for Gizmodo, Beth Elderkin called the episode "...the episode where we learned just how weird Legends was willing to go in pursuit of a great story". Collider's Gregory Mysogland said the episode was "crucial" in transitioning Legends of Tomorrow from the serious and grounded tone of the first season to the more comedic and whimsical one that is prevalent in later seasons.
