= Phone Home (Legends of Tomorrow) =

- Legends of Tomorrow episode
- Episode no.: Season 3 Episode 4
- Directed by: Kevin Mock
- Written by: Matthew Maala
- Production code: T13.20604
- Original air date: October 31, 2017

Guest appearance
- Jack Fisher as young Ray Palmer

Episode chronology
← Previous "Zari"	Next → "Return of the Mack"
- Legends of Tomorrow season 3

"Phone Home" is the fourth episode of the third season of the American television series Legends of Tomorrow. The series revolves around the eponymous team of superheroes and their time-traveling adventures. It is set in the Arrowverse, sharing continuity with the other television series of the universe. The episode was directed by Kevin Mock and written by Matthew Meela. It first aired on The CW on October 31, 2017, to an audience of 1.38 million viewers, with an additional million watching on DVR. It was praised by critics for its plot, tone, and comedy.

"Phone Home" focuses on Brandon Routh as Ray Palmer / The Atom with Jack Fisher guest starring as the younger version of the character. The episode features the Legends traveling to 1988 to protect the younger Ray (Fisher) from the alien Dominators. Meanwhile, Martin Stein (Victor Garber) is anxious about the birth of his grandson. The plot and title of the episode take inspiration from various films of the 1980s, particularly E.T. the Extra-Terrestrial.

== Plot ==
Hoping to make Zari Tomaz feel like part of the team, Ray Palmer plans a series of trust exercises before suddenly vanishing. Gideon reveals that he has been erased from existence after dying as a child on Halloween of 1988, they time travel back to save him. After the Legends arrive in Ivy Town in 1988, Ray reappears unaware of what happened. He and Zari approach his younger self and discover he adopted a baby alien, which the adult Ray recognizes as a Dominator, a race of aliens that invaded Earth in 2016. Suddenly, National Security Agency (NSA) agents arrive and kidnap the baby Dominator, forcing Zari and the two Rays to rescue it. Meanwhile, Sara Lance, Nate Heywood, and Amaya Jiwe learn that the Dominator's mother has returned to retrieve her child and that she will be responsible for killing young Ray. After finding the baby, it uses mind control to distract the agents by forcing them to perform a rendition of "Good Morning", they escape the NSA facility. Once free, young Ray returns the Dominator to its mother, who leaves in peace.

Meanwhile, Jefferson "Jax" Jackson and Mick Rory feel that Stein is acting suspiciously and wonder if he has betrayed the team. After finding him attempting to steal the Waverider's secondary vessel, he reveals that he is anxious to be present for the birth of his grandchild. Jax and Mick then pilot the Waverider and take Stein to Central City in 2017. After returning to 1988, Jax asks Ray to help him find a way to take Stein's powers so he can retire from the Legends.

== Production ==
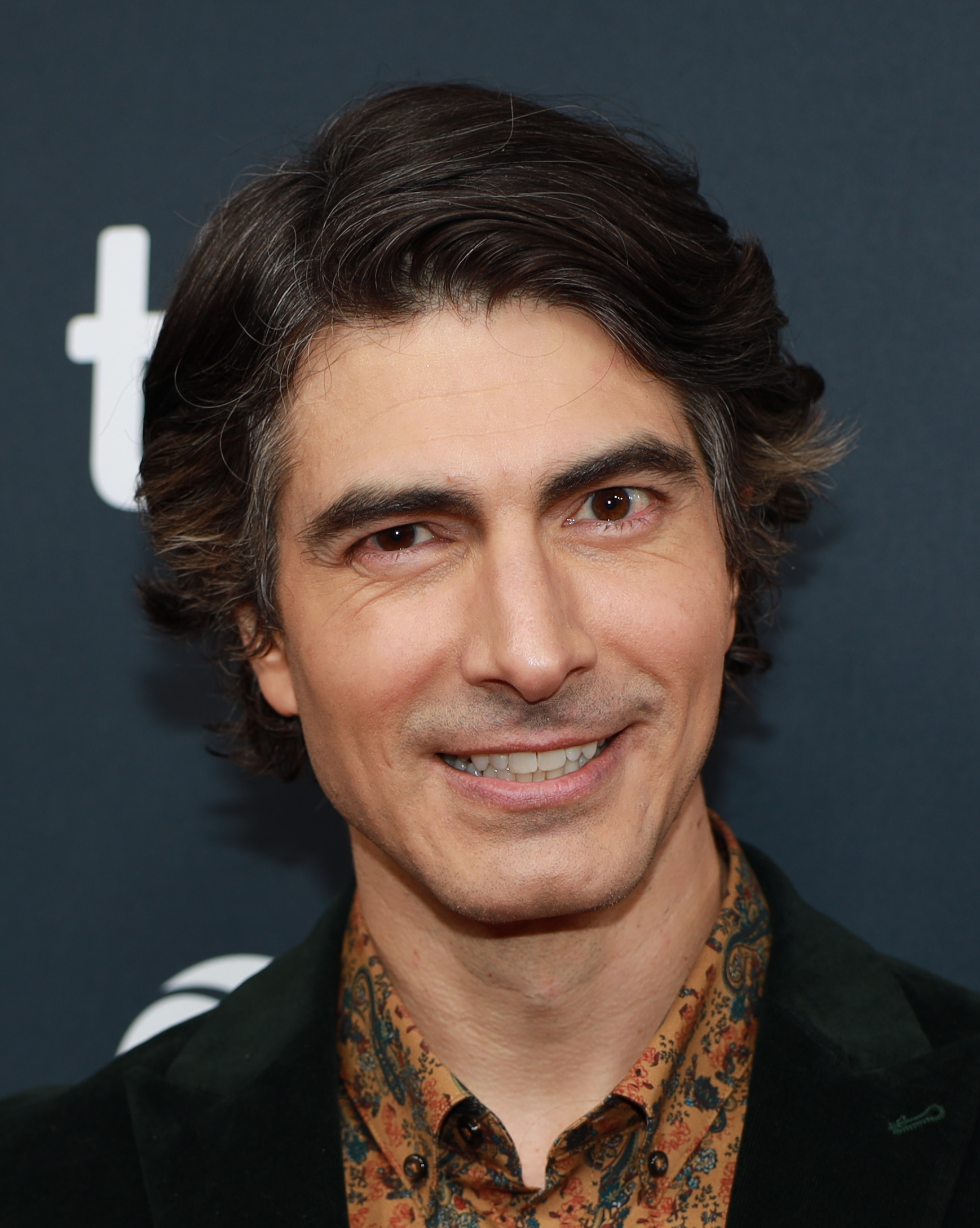
Brandon Routh at the 2024 Toronto International Film Festival in Toronto, Canada.

"Phone Home" was written by Mathew Maala and directed by Kevin Mock. It was the fifth episode of the series to be written by Maala as well as his first solo credit. The only other episode written solely by Maala was "Stressed Western" in season six. The production draft was finished on August 1, 2017, with the final version being completed on August 9. Preparation ran from July 31 through August 9. Shooting began the next day and concluded on August 22.

The episode stars Routh as Ray Palmer, alongside Tala Ashe, Franz Drameh, Dominic Purcell, Victor Garber, Caity Lotz, Nick Zano, Maisie Richardson-Sellers as Zari Tomaz, Jefferson Jackson, Mick Rory, Martin Stein, Sara Lance, Nate Heywood, and Amaya Jiwe respectively. Ashe's character was newly introduced. Jack Fisher guest stars as a younger version of Ray. The episode features the return of the Dominators, the fictional alien race which the Legends helped fight in the crossover event "Invasion!". Although Ray's older brother Sydney is mentioned in the episode, he does not appear in it. Routh told Screen Rant that he was open to introducing the character and stated the production staff considered including him.

The title of the episode, "Phone Home", is a reference to the 1981 film E.T. the Extra-Terrestrial. The episode also features several references to the film's plot. In an interview with Variety about the episode, Brandon Routh noted how the season had shifted away from the first season saying, "I like that we're starting to do this more with the show", drawing attention to the lack of pop culture references in the first season compared to the second and third. Additionally, critic Jim Dandeneau noted the subplot with the Dominator's mother had similarities with the films Aliens and Species. The song "Good Morning" in the episode as a musical number. It is set in the fictional Ivy Town, which was last seen in the episode "Pilot".

== Release ==
"Phone Home" first aired in the United States on The CW on October 31, 2017. It premiered to an audience of 1.38 million live viewers with a 0.4/2 share among adults 18–49. The episode was the lowest viewed broadcast in the Tuesday 9 p.m. timeslot, behind episodes of Bull, This Is Us, and Black-ish. Additionally, it was also the least viewed broadcast of the night on both The CW, behind an episode of The Flash, and overall. "Phone Home" was viewed by fifty thousand less viewers than the previous episode, "Helen Hunt", and 140 thousand less than the following episode, "Return of the Mack". When accounting for seven-day DVR viewership, the episode was viewed by an additional 1.04 million people for a total of 2.42 million viewers.

=== Critical reception ===
"Phone Home" was met with positive reviews from critics. Writing for IGN, Jesse Schedeen graded the episode a 9.2/10. Schedeen praised the role the Dominators played in the episode. He felt Tala Ashe as Zari was the weakest part of the episode and that the writers had yet to figure out her character. Den of Geek's Jim Dandeneau praised the episode, rating it 4.5/5 stars and calling it a "return to form" for the series. While he felt the story was somewhat derivative, he asserted that it still worked and was enjoyable. Bleeding Cool's Dan Wickline enjoyed the episode's plot, writing "for an episode that revolved around the possible death of a character and the discovery that Ray had kind of a sad, lonely upbringing, the story was upbeat and fun."

Collider's Liz Shannon Miller described the episode as "gleefully nerdy", yet felt that the title did not do the episode "justice ComicBook.com's Jenna Anderson labeled the musical number as one as of the best moments of the third season.
