= Miss Me, Kiss Me, Love Me =

- Legends of Tomorrow episode
- Episode no.: Season 5 Episode 2
- Directed by: David Geddes
- Written by: Ray Utarnachitt
- Production code: T13.21902
- Original air date: February 4, 2020

Guest appearances
- Shayan Sobhian as Behrad Tarazi; Jonathan Sadowski as Bugsy Siegel; Haley Strode as Jeanie Hill

Episode chronology
← Previous "Meet the Legends"	Next → "Slay Anything"
- Legends of Tomorrow (season 5)

"Miss Me, Kiss Me, Love Me" is the second episode of the fifth season and 70th overall of the American science fiction television series Legends of Tomorrow, revolving around the eponymous team of superheroes and their time travelling adventures. It is set in the Arrowverse, sharing continuity with the other television series of the universe.The episode was written by Ray Utarnachitt, and directed by David Geddes.

Caity Lotz stars as Sara Lance, and is joined by principal cast members Tala Ashe, Jes Macallan, Nick Zano, Matt Ryan, Brandon Routh, Dominic Purcell, Olivia Swann, and Amy Louise Pemberton.

== Plot ==
The Legends head to 1947 where mobster Bugsy Siegel has been revived, with Mona Wu coining the term "Encore" for these revived individuals. With his new lease on life, Bugsy plans to make it to the top in the world of crime by becoming an information broker. He also gets revenge on his killer, using a gun loaded with hellfire bullets to destroy their body and soul. Meanwhile, John Constantine poses as a detective to deal with Bugsy's girlfriend Jeanie Hill, who has been blackmailed and trapped into a relationship with him. With Constantine's aid, she finds the blackmail Bugsy has on others, but Jeanie, intends to use it to gain power, goes back to her car and is killed in an explosion caused by the city's dirty cops. The Legends capture Bugsy, but Constantine uses him to return to Hell. Constatine kills him with his own Hell Gun before warning Astra Logue, the mastermind behind the Encores, to stop. Meanwhile, Nate and Behrad Tarazi return to the latter's home time and town for dinner, where they find Zari has become an internet celebrity with no memory of Nate or her life with the Legends. Nate Heywood and Zari Tarazi almost connect when she realizes that they were both at Hey World decades ago but have not aged a day. She threatens to tell her parents about this but Behrad and Nate take her to the Waverider through a time portal.

== Production ==
=== Development and filming ===
This episode entered production on July 22, 2019. It finished writing two days later on the 24th.

=== Writing ===
The episode was written by Ray Utarnachitt. The episodes title is taken from song lyrics to "Poison" by Bell Biv DeVoe. Jes Macallen sings this song within the episode.

=== Casting ===
The episode stars Caity Lotz, Tala Ashe, Jes Macallan, Nick Zano, Matt Ryan, Brandon Routh, Dominic Purcell, Amy Louise Pemberton, Olivia Swann as Sara Lance, Zari Tarazi, Nate Haywood, John Constantine, Ray Palmer, Mick Rory, Gideon (voice), Astra Logue. Principal cast members Courtney Ford and Maisie Richardson-Sellers are both absent this episode.

This is the first episode where Tale Ashe plays Zari Tarazi as opposed to her previous character Zari Tomaz. Shayan Sobhian once again guest stars as Behrad Tarazi. Jonathan Sadowski guest stars as a heavily fictionalized version of Bugsy Siegel.

This is the first episode to not feature Ramona Young as Mona Wu since her debut in the episode "Dancing Queen". She would later return later in the season in a recurring role.

== Release ==
=== Broadcast ===
"Miss Me, Kiss Me, Love Me" was first aired in the United States on The CW on February 4, 2020. It was watched by 0.77 million people with a 0.2 share among adults 18–49.

=== Home video ===
"Miss Me, Kiss Me, Love Me" was first released on DVD and Blu-ray as part of the Legends of Tomorrow season five box set on September 22, 2020. The episode is not available as an individual disc. However it is available digitally on Amazon Prime Video and Vudu.

=== Critical reception ===
Allison Shoemaker of The A.V. Club rated the episode a B+. She noted that despite the lack of large nonsense elements it was still the core elements of Legends. Jim Dandeneau of Den of Geek, praised the focus on Brandon Routh, he rated the episode a 4 of 5. Lauren Coates of Culturess called the episode a great tribute to noir film. Michael Patterson of Bam! Smack! Pow! called the episode of the best in a while.
