= Here I Go Again (Legends of Tomorrow) =

- Legends of Tomorrow episode
- Episode no.: Season 3 Episode 11
- Directed by: Ben Bray
- Written by: Ray Utarnachitt; Morgan Faust
- Production code: T13.20611
- Original air date: February 19, 2018

Guest appearances
- Jes Macallan as Ava Sharpe; Adam Tsekhman as Gary Green; Keiynan Lonsdale as Wally West; Arthur Darvill as Rip Hunter

Episode chronology
| ← Previous "Daddy Darhkest" | Next → "The Curse of the Earth Totem" |
- Legends of Tomorrow season 3

"Here I Go Again" is the 11th episode of the third season of the American science fiction television series Legends of Tomorrow, revolving around the eponymous team of superheroes and their time traveling adventures. The episode is the 42nd overall to air; and is episode is set in the Arrowverse, sharing continuity with the other television series of the universe. The episode was written by Ray Utarnachitt and Morgan Faust and directed by Ben Bray.

"Here I Go Again" stars Tala Ashe as Zari Tomaz who seemingly gets stuck in a time loop and finds her place among the Legends. Throughout the episode she learns various secrets the Legends are hiding while growing closer to them.

"Here I Go Again" was met with positive reception from critics, who praised Ashe's acting and listed the episode as being among the best of the season. The episode features various pop culture references, most notably to the film Groundhog Day and the TV series Star Trek: The Next Generation. The episode aired on February 19, 2018, on The CW, premiering to 1.4 million viewers.

== Plot ==
Zari Tomaz tries to override Gideon's servers but accidentally breaks her just as the Legends return from a mission. In an attempt to repair the Waverider, Zari seemingly activates a program that blows up the ship before re-experiencing events from earlier that day until the ship explodes again. Zari asks Nate Haywood for assistance and the pair try to find the cause of the explosion. Through her loops Zari grows closer to the Legends and discovers experiencing the same events over and over while learning mysterious secrets about the team, such as Mick Rory's erotic sci-fi novel, Nate and Amaya Jiwe's relationship, and Sara Lance's feelings towards Ava Sharpe.

Zari begins to feel trapped and attempts to kill herself, but Sara intervenes and talks her down. Zari then informs the time loop, and the Legends investigate. They eventually, discover the source of the repetition is a device that Gary Green who had been trapped in the ship's cargo bay. Mick destroys Gary's device; Gary immediately reveals to them that the device was causing the loops and was not the bomb.

When the ship is next set to explode, Zari takes the bomb and seals herself with it and uses her powers to try to contain the blast. She reappears in an empty Waverider, where she encounters Gideon's human form, who reveals to her that she was in the med bay and alive. Gideon had transported Zari's consciousness into a simulation and that the loops were all in her head. She explains that if she had not Zari would have left the Legends and would not have been able to save 2042 without their help. Zari leaves the med bay and admits to Sara that she was researching historical loopholes to see if she could save her brother, which Sara reassures her might be possible. Meanwhile, the recently escaped Rip Hunter tracks down Wally West in Yunnan Province, China.

== Production ==
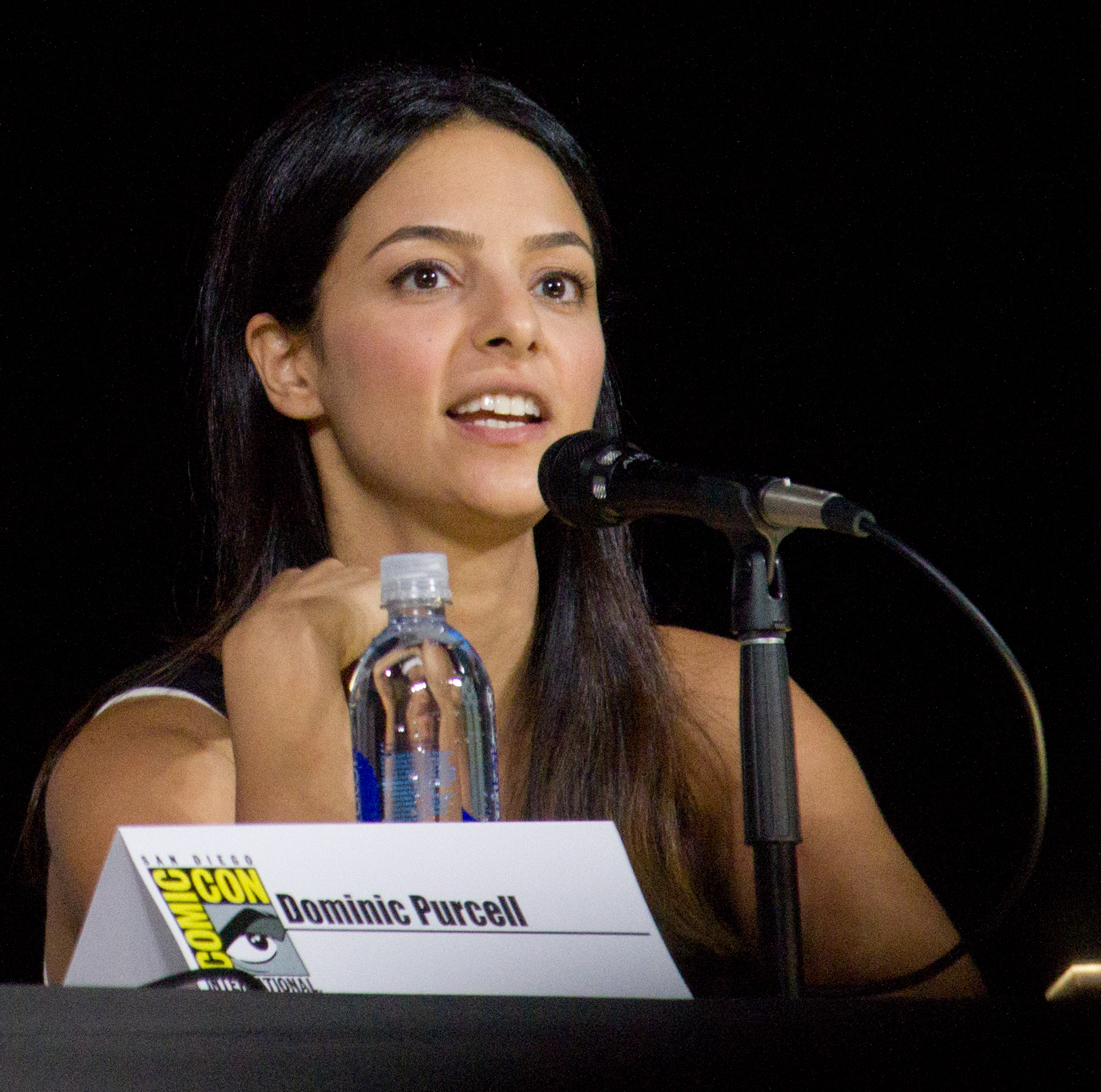
Tala Ashe at San Diego Comic-Con 2017.

"Here I Go Again" was written by Ray Utarnachitt and Morgan Faust, and was directed by Ben Bray. The episode's title is a reference to the ABBA song "Mamma Mia". The episode takes inspiration from other time loop stories including Groundhog Day and the Star Trek: The Next Generation episode "Cause and Effect". Both are directly name dropped in the episode. "Here I Go Again" features meta-humor in regards to the time loop premise.

The story is centered entirely around Zari and does not feature a b-story. Additionally it is considered a bottle episode as it is set entirely on the Waverider. Speaking with Collider Tala Ashe stated that she shot for 14-16 hours a day for the days.

In a 2017 interview with Russ Burlingame for ComicBook.com, Ashe reflected the episode. She described the episode as a "gift" to her from the writers as it would give her a chance to better explore her character. Ashe stated she was proud of the episode after its release.

"Here I Go Again introduces the running gag of Mick Rory secretly being romance novelist.

=== Casting ===
"Here I Go Again" stars Tala Ashe as Zari Tomaz, joined by Nick Zano, Caity Lotz, Brandon Routh, Dominic Purcell and Amy Pemberton, as Nate Heywood, Sara Lance, Ray Palmer, Mick Rory and Gideon, respectively. This is the second episode, after season 2's "Land of the Lost", where Pemberton physically appears as her character as opposed to only voicing her. Though as opposed to "Land of the Lost" she exclusively interacts with Zari. During an interview Ahse stated that she was told she was "going to be in every single scene".

Keiynan Lonsdale reprises his role as Wally West which he previously played on The Flash. While Lonsdale is credited as a guest in the episode, for the rest of the season he is credited among the main cast. He previously made a cameo appearance in the season premiere, "Aruba-Con". Adam Tsekhman and Jes Macallan guest star as Gary Green and Ava Sharpe respectively. Arthur Darvill appears in the episodes closing moments as Rip Hunter.

== Release ==
"Here I Go Again" first aired in the United States on The CW on February 19, 2018. It premiered to 1.4 million live viewers with a 0.4/2 share among adults 18–49. The episode finished last in its time slot behind Celebrity Big Brother, The Bachelor, the 2018 Winter Olympics and a rerun of Lucifer. It placed tenth out of twelve of the night overall. The episode had a viewership decrease of around 100 thousand viewers from the previous episode, "Daddy Darhkest". The following episode, "The Curse of the Earth Totem", had an increase of around 100 thousand viewers. The episode was seventh lowest viewed of the season.

=== Critical reception ===
"Here I Go Again" was met with positive reviews from critics. Writing for Collider, Adam Virgona listed the episode the best of season three. Writing for Tell-Tale TV, Jennifer Ann felt similar. Ann praised the writing noting how the episode could have easily been poorly executed. Jim Dandeneau of Den of Geek rated the episode a 4.5/5, describing it as delightful and praised the performance of Ashe noting that she had great chemistry with the rest of the cast particularly with Pemberton and Zano. IGN's Jesse Schedeen rated the episode a 7.8/10. Schedeen praised the performance of Ashe, feeling that it properly integrated the character into the show's cast.

Writing for The A.V. Club, Oliver Sava rated the episode an "A", praising the episode's comedic and light-hearted tone. Also writing for The A.V. Club William Hughes listed "Here I Go Again" among the series best, describing it as one of the greatest character introduction Legends of Tomorrow has done.

In a retrospective of the episode for ComicBook.com, Russ Burlingame praised the episode's writing and acting particularly noting how it properly integrated Zari into the Legends.
