= Isis (DC Comics) =

- Artwork for the cover of 52 Week Twelve, the debut of the Adrianna Tomaz character as Isis within the main DC Comics continuity. Art by J. G. Jones.

Publication information
- Publisher: DC Comics
- First appearance: The Secrets of Isis: "The Lights of Mystery Mountain" (September 6, 1975)
- First comic appearance: Shazam! #25 (October 1976)
- Created by: Marc Richards

In-story information
- Alter ego: Andrea Thomas; Adrianna Tomaz
- Species: Metahuman
- Place of origin: United States (Andrea); Kahndaq / Cairo (Adrianna)
- Team affiliations: Black Marvel Family
- Supporting character of: Black Adam; Captain Marvel / Shazam
- Notable aliases: The Mighty Isis
- Abilities: Transformation via magic amulet forged by grants numerous powers derived from Isis: Superhuman strength, stamina, durability, speed, agility, reflexes, wisdom, and flight.; Nature manipulation, psychokinesis, healing, and other magical abilities.

Isis is a superheroine appearing in American comic books published by DC Comics and in media, originally created by Marc Richards in September 1975 before being reinvented in 52 #12 (July 2006). While related to the eponymous goddess, the character is often associated with Black Adam's supporting cast, particularly as his love interest.

Within the character's original appearance in The Secrets of Isis starring Joanna Cameron, her alter ego is Andrea Thomas, a science teacher who gains powers linked to the aforementioned ancient Egyptian goddess through a magical amulet during a archaeological dig and becomes a superhero. Much later, the character was re-invented as Adrianna Tomaz, an Egyptian refugee forced into slavery by Intergang but freed from captivity by Black Adam. Impressed with her diplomatic philosophy and outspoken nature, he gives her a magical amulet also once empowered by the Wizard Shazam, transforming her into "Isis", a demigoddess-like being with powers akin to her namesake. She marries Black Adam and alongside her brother, Amon Tomaz (aka Osiris), she is a member of the Black Marvel Family and Queen of Kahndaq. The character is later killed off by enemies with ties to Apokolips and various revisions had since resurrected the character. In current continuity, Isis remains dead.

The television series Smallville depicts Isis as a supervillain form taken on by Lois Lane (portrayed by Erica Durance) when possessed by the Amulet of Isis. Adrianna Tomaz appears later in the episode, portrayed by Erica Cerra. The Arrowverse television series Legends of Tomorrow introduces a new incarnation of the character named Zari Tomaz, portrayed by Tala Ashe. This version was portrayed as a wisecracking hacker from the future with wind powers derived from an amulet and no superhero code name. After the fourth season, another version of the character (also portrayed by Ashe) is introduced after an in-universe timeline change: Zari Tarazi, a social media influencer. The Adrianna Tomaz version of the character appears in the DC Extended Universe film Black Adam (2022), portrayed by Sarah Shahi.

== Appearances ==
Joanna Cameron as Isis in The Secrets of Isis

=== Shazam!/Isis Hour ===
Like the main character of the first half of the program, Captain Marvel, Isis had roots in ancient Egyptian mythology. The television series The Secrets of Isis starred Joanna Cameron as Andrea Thomas, a high school science teacher who gains the ability to call upon the powers of the goddess Isis after finding an Egyptian amulet during an archeological dig in Egypt, as revealed during the show's opening title sequence. Fifteen episodes of The Secrets of Isis were produced for The Shazam! Isis Hour, and the character also appeared in three episodes of the Shazam! portion of the show. The Secrets of Isis was given its own timeslot in 1977, for which seven new episodes were broadcast alongside reruns from the first two seasons.

=== Freedom Force & other animated appearances ===
Isis later appeared in animated form on Filmation's Tarzan and the Super 7 show in 1980, as part of a segment called The Freedom Force. She later guest starred on The Kid Super Power Hour with Shazam!'s "Hero High" segment, though Cameron did not voice the character.

=== Publication history in DC Comics ===
Isis' first appearance in comics was in Shazam! #25 (September – October 1976). She was later given her own TV tie-in book the following month, titled The Mighty Isis, which ran for two years, out-surviving the TV series. The eight-issue run by DC Comics began in October 1976 and ended in January 1978; early issues featured a special "DC TV" logo. All stories starred the Andrea Thomas character from the television series; the book was edited by Denny O'Neil, written by Jack C. Harris and most issues illustrated by Mike Vosburg (the first issue was illustrated by Ric Estrada and Wallace Wood). Although early issues stayed within the format of the TV series, later issues covered storylines beyond the scope of the show, such as a story arc involving Andrea abandoning her "human" alter ego and cutting ties with her friends and family, resulting in Rick Mason revealing his love for her. Like other DC characters who have been reimagined, this version of Isis, though not mentioned or appearing in Crisis on Infinite Earths, can be assumed to have been retconned out of existence following the 1985 DC miniseries.

The superhero Isis was re-introduced in the DC Universe in the weekly comic book 52, in issue #3 (May 2006).

== Characterization ==
=== Adrianna's fictional character biography ===
An Egyptian refugee enslaved by Intergang, she was presented to Black Adam alongside gold as tribute but her captors were killed and she was freed. A outspoken advocate for the betterment of Kahndaq, Black Adam is impressed with her political abilities and philosophy and empowers her through a magical amulet he entrsuts to her, which transforms her into Isis. The pair would wed shortly after, with the Marvel Family attending alongside American friends, Renee Montoya and Vic Sage, and become the monarchs of Kahndaq. Together, the pair embark on a campaign throughout the Middle East to liberate enslaved children and search for Amon Tomaz. After finding Amon, Adrianna sees that he has been brutualized; Adam shares his power with Amon, transforming him into Osiris.

Now revealing themselves globally, Adrianna's influences allows them to became popular among the world community but Amanda Waller's Suicide Squad defames them when the Persuader is killed by Osiris, who was a prospective member of the Titans and sought to protect her when his weapon proved able to injure Adrianna. Intergang also orchestrates a series of calculated events using forces from Apokolips, resulting in disease and famine within the nation and the untimely death of Osiris by fellow Sobek, who is revealed to be one of the four Horsemen of Apokolips. Adrianna herself is killed by the Horseman of Pestilence and expresses regret in her final moments. Both her and Amon's death was a catalyst for World War III, in which Black Adam goes on a lone rampage around the world punishing his enemies and those involved in killing them.

Her deceased body is later used by Felix Faust upon Adam's request to first re-empower him with a facet of her powers and to search for the lost pieces for the Amulet of Isis although every transformation would risk weakening her bones and forgoing resurrection. Black Adam succeeds in procuring the lost parts of the amulet but is fooled by Faust, making him believe he botched Adrianna's resurrection. Faust privately resurrects Isis, allowing him to escape from being exclusive trapped in the Tower of Fate and enslaved under his control. While Faust sexually assaults her while under his thrall, she manages to covertly alert Adam to her survival, who frees Adrianna from his control. In return, she castrates him with her bare hands. Now harboring a darker personality, she and Black Adam teams up to "cleanse" the Earth, culminating to a conflict with the Justice Society, Captain Marvel (now with the Wizard's position and power), and Mary Marvel. When the situation escalates further from Isis killing her own followers, Adam is convinced to free the petrified Wizard Shazam to save her from corruption but the vengeful wizard also petrifies both Adam and Adrianna. Osiris is eventually able to resurrect her from her petrification state using Freddy Freeman's power as Captain Marvel, depowering him in the process. However, his previous killing while invoking her name has also corrupted her soul once more and she goes into a rampage. When she tries to commit suicide, Osiris shields much of her attack. Although she is cleared from her own corruption, she senses some within Osiris, unaware of Blaze's indirect influence. Witnessing Osiris's bloodlust and later Deathstroke's Titans mercenary team and Justice League clash in Kahndaq, she demotes Osiris from his position as ruler, forbids foreign outsiders from approaching Kahndaq (chiefly the Justice League), and withdraws from the United Nations.

Following The New 52, a new version of Adrianna briefly appears. However, her history is later reverted to the period where she was killed by the Horseman of Pestilence. She would be referenced by Mister Mind when he attempted to persuade Black Adam to joining his Monster Society of Evil, claiming the Darkland's power could resurrect Isis and Osiris.

=== Powers and abilities ===
==== Andrea Thomas's powers and abilities ====
Isis demonstrated numerous powers that manifested when the need arose. These included flight, super speed, super strength (to a level comparable to Superman and Wonder Woman), telekinesis (the ability to move and levitate objects), geokinesis (the ability to control elements such as fire, earth, wind, and water), the ability to change the molecules of inanimate objects to allow people to pass through them, the ability to act as a human lightning rod, remote viewing, and (at her power's maximum) the ability to stop and reverse time. To activate these powers, Isis usually is shown reciting a rhyming chant (the most frequent being "Oh zephyr winds that blow on high, lift me now so I can fly!"). The medallion Andrea Thomas uses to change into Isis also gives her apparent limited powers even when in her non-Isis form, as she is shown communicating telepathically with her pet crow Tut and engaging in minor mind control even without changing. She also received superior hand-to-hand and weapons combat skills from the goddess.

==== Adrianna Tomaz's powers and abilities ====
While not empowered, Adrianna is proficient in politics and leadership, making her a considerably popular ruler with a focus on Kahndaq's welfare as a nation. She is also skilled in botany. While empowered, her source of powers were first granted by the Amulet of Isis, a powerful artifact created by the Wizard Shazam. Over time, her body absorbed the magical energies of the amulet, culminating to her powers becoming inherent. These powers are activated by the phrase "I am Isis!".

In her empowered form, she gains physical powers similar to Black Adam and Osiris; she possess superhuman strength that allows her to lift at least 6,000 tons, superhuman speed of at least 16,000 mph (Mach 20), superhuman durability, and superhuman wisdom. Her exceptional agility also makes her skilled and nimble in combat situations. Additionally, she also gains various magical power such as healing powers that can affect humans, plant-life, and animals. Other magical powers includes the power to manipulate elements, telekinesis, control natural phenomena such as storms, and empathic powers that can sooth tensions and bring out positive attributes within others.

== Other versions ==
- In the 52 series, Black Adam reveals that Queen Pharaoh Hatshepsut was once a champion of the Wizard Shazam. Wielding the Amulet of Isis, she used the powers granted to her to safeguard her kingdom and shortly after her demise, the amulet was returned to the wizard in hopes of one day finding a worthy successor.
- After the New 52 reboot, a new version of Adrianna Tomaz appeared. In this new timeline, Adrianna Tomaz is a young woman who, by fighting specifically against Kahndaq's evil rule, is opposed to her brother Amon entering The Sons of Adam terrorist group. However, after he is killed by Kahndaq's forces and she is forced to resurrect Black Adam, Adrianna decides to follow a path of violence, with an unknown voice saying that she will be chosen to wield power.

== In other media ==
=== Television ===
- The superhero Isis appears in The Freedom Force, voiced by Diane Pershing. This version is a member of the titular team.
- Two variations of Isis appear in a self-titled episode of Smallville. The first is Lois Lane (portrayed by Erica Durance) after she is possessed by the Amulet of Isis. Additionally, Egyptologist and curator of the Metropolis Museum, "Adrianna", appears in the episode, portrayed by Erica Cerra.
- Both the goddess and superhero incarnations of Isis appear in Young Justice.
- A variation of Adrianna Tomaz named Zari Tomaz appears in Legends of Tomorrow, portrayed by Tala Ashe. This version is a Persian-American hacker from the year 2042 who possesses aerokinesis via the Air Totem. In one Halloween-themed episode, Zari dons a costume based upon the one worn by Joanna Cameron's Isis. In the course of the series, a version of Zari from an alternate timeline (named Zari Tarazi and still played by Ashe) begins sharing Tomaz's existence and totem.

=== Film ===
Adrianna Tomaz appears in Black Adam, portrayed by Sarah Shahi. This version is an archaeologist and resistance fighter in Intergang-controlled Kahndaq.

=== Video games ===
- Isis appears in DC Universe Online, voiced by Samantha Inoue-Harte. This version died sometime prior to the game before Felix Faust resurrects her as a zombie.
- Isis appears in Black Adam's ending in Injustice: Gods Among Us.
- Isis appears in Black Adam's ending in Injustice 2.
