= Legends of Tomorrow season 3 =

Legends of Tomorrow
- Season 3
- Home media cover
- Showrunners: Phil Klemmer; Chris Fedak
- Starring: Victor Garber; Brandon Routh; Caity Lotz; Franz Drameh; Maisie Richardson-Sellers; Amy Louise Pemberton; Tala Ashe; Keiynan Lonsdale; Nick Zano; Dominic Purcell
- No. of episodes: 18

Release
- Original network: The CW
- Original release: October 10, 2017 – April 9, 2018

Season chronology
- ← Previous; Season 2 Next → Season 4

The third season of the American television series Legends of Tomorrow, based on DC Comics characters, premiered on The CW on October 10, 2017, and ran for 18 episodes until April 9, 2018. The season follows the Legends, a dysfunctional team of time-traveling superheroes and anti-heroes, and their mission to correct their unintentional anachronisms. Set in the Arrowverse and sharing continuity with that universe's other TV series, it is a spin-off of Arrow and The Flash. The season was produced by Berlanti Productions, Warner Bros. Television and DC Entertainment, with Phil Klemmer and Chris Fedak its showrunners.

Ordered in January 2017, production began that July and ended in February 2018. Principal cast members Caity Lotz, Brandon Routh, Victor Garber, Franz Drameh, Maisie Richardson-Sellers, Amy Pemberton, Nick Zano, and Dominic Purcell return from previous seasons and are joined by new cast members Tala Ashe and The Flash alumnus Keiynan Lonsdale. Drameh, Garber and Lonsdale left the series during the season. Several of the season's recurring characters became regulars during the following season, including Matt Ryan, Jes Macallan, and Courtney Ford.

The season received positive reviews from critics who praised its lightheartedness and cast, and several felt that it was a great improvement over the previous two seasons. The series was nominated for a Best Superhero Television Series, and the season averaged 2.37 million viewers per episode.

== Overview ==
Following the season 2 finale where the Legends attempted to time travel with two versions of themselves aboard the Waverider had a larger impact on time than they thought. Due to this blunder, anachronisms (including objects and people) have popped up along the timeline. Rip Hunter's Time Bureau, a replacement for the Time Masters, forces the Legends to disband and resume normal lives. They are forced back into action as deputized members of the Time Bureau, however, unaware that Rip is planning to use their often-destructive tendencies for a threat bigger than the anachronisms.

== Episodes ==
Season three episodes
No. overall	No. in season	Title	Directed by	Written by	Original release date	Prod. code	U.S. viewers (millions)
34	1	"Aruba-Con"	Rob Seidenglanz	Phil Klemmer & Marc Guggenheim	October 10, 2017	T13.20601	1.71
In an altered Los Angeles the Legends encounter Rip, who reveals that he has created a Time Bureau to replace the Time Masters' Council. Bureau agents fix anachronisms, and Rip disbands the Legends. Six months later they are living normal lives, nostalgic for their previous adventures. In Aruba, Mick captures Julius Caesar, informs the other Legends, and returns to the bureau. After delivering the wrong man and being dismissed by Rip, the Legends steal the Waverider and capture the real Caesar. When Rip demands that they deliver Caesar to the bureau and let them fix the anachronism, the Legends return Caesar to 49 BC themselves. During the return, Caesar steals Nate's history book and uses this knowledge to conquer the world. The bureau arrives, seizing control of the operation. Agent Ava Sharpe is captured during an excursion to retrieve the book, forcing Rip to allow the Legends to fix the anachronism; he later tells Sharpe that they could be useful in neutralizing Mallus. Amaya, with significantly-improved powers, attacks a group of poachers in 1942 Zambesi.
35	2	"Freakshow"	Kevin Tancharoen	Keto Shimizu & Grainne Godfree	October 17, 2017	T13.20602	1.58
Amaya learns about Mari's vigilantism and leaves Nate. Six months later, the Legends head to an anachronism in an 1870 Wisconsin circus led by P.T. Barnum, who has captured an extinct sabertooth tiger. Ray's shrinking device malfunctions, leading to the enlargement and escape of the tiger. Sara visits Amaya and convinces her to return, to Nate's displeasure. While Nate, Ray, and Jax visit an inn, Amaya and Sara shrink and capture the tiger. Drunk and depressed about his relationship with Amaya, Nate tells Barnum about their powers. Intending to use them for his shows, Barnum captures Ray and Jax. When Nate tells the Legends about his actions, Amaya reveals why she broke up with him in 2017. (Note: As depicted in "Aruba".) While Sara engages with Sharpe on the Waverider, the Legends attack the circus and rescue their teammates (removing the anachronism). Nate reconciles with Amaya, who tells the Legends that she has begun to lose control of her animal powers; her behavior has become psychopathic. Rip tells the Legends about Mallus, an ancient archenemy of the Time Masters; he believes that the outlying anachronisms are Mallus' work. They disregard his warning. A follower of Mallus summons Kuasa, Mari's sister.
36	3	"Zari"	Mairzee Almas	James Eagan & Ray Utarnachitt	October 24, 2017	T13.20603	1.43
In 2042 Seattle, bureau agent Gary Green discovers Kuasa (who now can control water) while pursuing hacktivist Zari and sends a distress signal. The Legends receive it and find Seattle under martial law imposed by A.R.G.U.S., which is hunting down metahumans. They find Zari, who demands help rescuing her brother from prison in exchange for learning about her powers. Stein and Nate seek a solution, and Nate synthesizes a Zambesi hallucinogen. Amaya uses it to have a vision of an ancestor who advises her to trust her increasing strength. Jax initiates an unplanned prison break; Zari retrieves her brother's amulet (indicating his murder by A.R.G.U.S.) and abandons the team. Ray pursues her to a campsite where her family is to meet. Kuasa attacks the two while Sharpe pursues the Waverider in the timestream. The Legends arrive and Amaya (now in control of her powers) defeats Kuasa, who vanishes using a mystical item after implying that she is Amaya's descendant. Sharpe warns Sara that if the Legends are arrested, they would be banished to the "dawn of time". Amaya decides to stay, and recruits Zari to the team. In 1988, a young Ray encounters an unknown creature.
37	4	"Phone Home"	Kevin Mock	Matthew Maala	October 31, 2017	T13.20604	1.38
Ray suddenly disappears from the Waverider, and Gideon reveals that he died around Halloween in 1988. The Legends travel to 1988, when Ray reappears and finds that his younger self has adopted a baby Dominator. NSA agents take the baby Dominator, leading Ray, young Ray, and Zari to rescue it while Sara, Nate, and Amaya learn that the Dominator's mother has returned to retrieve her child. The mother (who killed young Ray) traps Sara in a web. Sara escapes, and the baby uses mind control to distract the agents. The Legends return it to its mother, who leaves in peace. When young Ray is bullied on Halloween, the Legends defend him. Jax and Mick learn that Stein is anxious to be present for the birth of his grandchild and help him, "borrowing" the Waverider. Jax later asks Ray to help him find a way to take Stein's Firestorm powers so he can leave the Legends.
38	5	"Return of the Mack"	Alexandra La Roche	Grainne Godfree & Morgan Faust	November 7, 2017	T13.20605	1.52
Nate discovers a pattern in the anachronisms, with two outliers: Kuasa's attack, and a suspected vampire attack in Victorian London. The Legends meet Rip, who is investigating a conspiracy involving Mallus. They discover their enemy Damien Darhk's body, which apparently fell through a temporal rift into this time period. Zari encounters Nora Darhk, a follower of Mallus who steals her amulet while working with a Victorian occult society. Rip traps the Legends on the Waverider for protection before attending Damien's resurrection, which Nora achieves with the amulet. Damien and Nora escape after killing several bureau agents led by Rip. Sara reports Rip's action to the bureau, and he is arrested for re-legitimizing the Legends. Rip warns Sara about Mallus' importance. Jax has Ray try to sever his psychic connection with Stein as a precursor to breaking their physical link as Firestorm, but experiences short-term memory loss. Stein finds out and decides to help them.
39	6	"Helen Hunt"	David Geddes	Keto Shimizu & Ubah Mohamed	November 14, 2017	T13.20606	1.53
Jax and Martin swap bodies after their attempt to transfer Firestorm to Jax fails. The Legends track an anachronism to 1937 Hollywood: Helen of Troy. Attempting to extract Helen at a party, the team encounters Damien, Nora, and Kuasa; Damien tells Sara that he will spare their lives if they stop time-traveling. Stein meets Hedy Lamarr, and the other male Legends fight over Helen. The female Legends confront Helen privately. After she refuses to return to Troy because men die over her, Helen is captured by the female Legends. Stein learns that Lamarr has become a switchboard operator; because she does not invent frequency-hopping spread spectrum, the Waverider breaks down. The Legends go to Lamarr's workplace, resulting in a confrontation with Damien's forces. Lamarr tells Jax and Stein to merge, which allows them to return to their original bodies. Nora tries to drain Sara's soul but is driven off by Firestorm, leaving Sara comatose. Damien, Nora and Kuasa retreat. A sympathetic Zari brings Helen to Themyscira, instead of Troy.
40	7	"Welcome to the Jungle"	Mairzee Almas	Ray Utarnachitt & Tyron B. Carter	November 21, 2017	T13.20607	1.49
With Sara in a coma, the Legends investigate creature attacks during the Vietnam War. Zari, Ray, and Amaya, posing as journalists, meet a woman who shows them the creature (a time-displaced Gorilla Grodd). Nate and Mick are captured by a squad led by Mick's father, Dick Rory. On the Waverider, Stein discusses separating Firestorm with Isaac Newton. Jax walks in on their discussion and learns that Firestorm can be separated, but it would depower Jax. The anachronism increases in intensity, revealing Grodd's plan to wipe out humanity by killing President Johnson and starting World War III. Jax saves Johnson from a minefield. After failing to capture Grodd, Amaya uses her powers to negotiate with him but is thwarted when Dick's squad attacks. Grodd decides to steal the Waverider and erase humanity from the timeline. His attempt fails, and he apparently falls to his death. In Grodd's compound, Mick stops his father from massacring Grodd's prisoners and comes to terms with their relationship. The team returns to the ship as Sara awakens. In 2017, Grodd is approached by Damien.
41	8	"Crisis on Earth-X, Part 4"	Gregory Smith	Story by : Marc Guggenheim & Andrew Kreisberg; Teleplay by : Phil Klemmer & Keto Shimizu	November 28, 2017	T13.20608	2.80
On Earth-X, Stein activates the temporal gateway's portal before his death. Jax bonds with Stein to get him through the portal with Barry, Oliver, Sara, Alex, Ray Terrill, and Leo Snart (Leonard Snart's Earth-X doppelgänger). Members of the teams face off against Earth-X Metallo, while Felicity and Kara are cornered by Dark Arrow before Oliver saves them. Jax is affected by Stein's wounds, since Stein severs their link. Dark Arrow tries to negotiate for Kara, but Oliver refuses and the team battles Dark Arrow's forces. Caitlin, Amaya, and Zari infiltrate the Nazi timeship Wellenreiter to disable its shields so Harry and Cisco can destroy it with the Waverider. Barry defeats Thawne but allows him to escape, resuming their feud. Supergirl battles Overgirl, flying her into space to detonate away from Earth. Oliver kills Dark Arrow. Terrill returns to Earth-X, but Leo chooses to stay and joins the Legends. The team has a funeral for Stein. The Legends, Kara, and Alex return to their own lives. Barry and Iris are married by John Diggle, who also marries Oliver and Felicity. Note: This episode concludes a crossover event that begins on Supergirl season 3 episode 8, and continues on Arrow season 6 episode 8 and The Flash season 4 episode 8.
42	9	"Beebo the God of War"	Kevin Mock	Grainne Godfree & James Eagan	December 5, 2017	T13.20609	1.61
The team tracks down another anachronism: a young Martin Stein, displaced in the time of the Vikings. Martin was buying a talking Beebo toy for his daughter when he was displaced, causing the Vikings to believe that Beebo is the god of war. Damien, disguised as Odin, is exposed by the Legends. Sara chases Damien, but ends up in Mallus's dimension before being pulled back to the real world by Ava. Jax tries to tell young Stein about his future self's death; Stein had already deduced it and decides not to learn the details of his death, however, accepting his fate and resolving to dedicate his remaining years to his loved ones. With the present Stein dead and his Firestorm powers gone, Jax leaves the team after an impromptu Christmas celebration. After saying goodbye to him Sara is greeted by John Constantine, who says that he needs the Legends' help with a demon who knows her name and is controlling a little girl.
43	10	"Daddy Darhkest"	Dermott Downs	Keto Shimizu & Matthew Maala	February 12, 2018	T13.20610	1.51
Constantine tells the Legends about the demon Mallus (whom Sara encountered), who is tormenting Damien's daughter Nora in an insane asylum in 2017. Constantine, Sara, and Leo go to meet her, but are sent to 1969 by Mallus. They begin looking for ingredients for a spell to return, and Sara and Constantine bond. In the present, Ray and Zari look for the missing trio in the asylum before taking Nora out for coffee; Mallus possesses Nora, and attacks Ray and Zari. Sara re-enters Mallus' realm in 1969, where she finds a frightened Nora and encourages her to fight Mallus. In the present, Nora breaks free of Mallus; when Damien shows up, Nora leaves with him. Constantine uses a spell to bring himself, Sara, and Leo back to the present before leaving the team with Leo. During the encounter with Mallus, Zari discovers that the demon was damaged and frightened by the totem that empowers her and the team begins looking for the remaining Zambesi totems. Ava tells the Legends that Rip Hunter escaped.
44	11	"Here I Go Again"	Ben Bray	Ray Utarnachitt & Morgan Faust	February 19, 2018	T13.20611	1.40
Zari tries to repair the Waverider, but is covered in goo and apparently activates a program that blows up the ship before re-experiencing events from earlier that day. The day keeps repeating, with Zari learning secrets about the team (such as Mick's writing ability). The Legends learn that Gary caused the repetition. Mick destroys Gary's device, but Gary tells them that the repetition was the only thing saving them from death. When the ship is next set to explode, Zari seals herself in the study and uses her powers to contain the blast. She reappears in an empty Waverider, where she encounters Gideon's human form; she reassures her that she is alive in the medical bay, and he transported Zari to her program to convince her to stay with the Legends. Zari tells Sara that she was researching historical loopholes to see if she could save her brother, and Sara tells her that it might be possible. In Yunnan, the recently-escaped Rip Hunter tracks down Wally West.
45	12	"The Curse of the Earth Totem"	Chris Tammaro	Grainne Godfree & Ubah Mohamed	February 26, 2018	T13.20612	1.51
The team reviews the list of totems and decides to find the Fire Totem first, but Damien retrieves it. Sara dates Ava. While she is away, the team takes the Waverider to the 1700s Bahamas to find the Earth Totem. They encounter a pirate crew led by Edward Teach which includes Damien, who steals Amaya's Anansi Totem. After learning about the team's trouble, Sara leaves her date with Ava to help them. The Waverider is attacked by cannonballs and boarded by Blackbeard and his crew, but Ava helps Sara fight them off. During the fight, Ray shoots Nora with a nanite gun to save Amaya. Most of the team escapes, taking the Earth Totem; Ray, meeting Nora as a child, is wracked by guilt and offers to cure her in exchange for the Anansi Totem. Damien accepts, but the Darhks capture Ray after Nora is cured. Rip and Wally bond, getting drunk together. The following morning, Rip tells Wally that the world needs him and an outcast like him would suit the Legends.
46	13	"No Country for Old Dads"	Viet Nguyen	Keto Shimizu & James Eagan	March 5, 2018	T13.20613	1.19
Damien tells Nora and Ray to travel to 1962 East Berlin to retrieve information about cold fusion to fix the Fire Totem. Rip brings Wally to the Legends, and they try to work out their next move. Nora corrupts the Anansi Totem and the Legends learn that the Darhks are creating anachronisms to weaken Mallus' cage, freeing him. Ray blasts a hole in the Berlin Wall when cornered by Nora, causing another anachronism and allowing the Legends to find him. Wally rescues Ray and takes the Fire Totem. Director Bennett is murdered by Grodd, making Ava senior officer of the Time Bureau and allowing Rip to return. Wally intends to go with Rip and Ava, but Sara convinces him to stay with the Legends and Rip congratulates him. Rip tells Gideon to delete Ava's file before he leaves, saying that Sara must never know Ava's secret. Mallus regains control of Nora behind Damien's back.
47	14	"Amazing Grace"	David Geddes	Matthew Maala & Tyron B. Carter	March 12, 2018	T13.20614	1.26
Wally moves into the Waverider and annoys everyone with his super-speed. The team soon finds differences on the ship, such as Nate's hair, Mick's rat's name, and Zari's game. Tracking the anachronism, they learn that mass panic was caused in Memphis, Tennessee in 1954 during a performance by Elvis Presley. Presley's guitar contains the final totem (the Death Totem) which, unlike the other five totems, was used by Mallus. Presley admits he might quit music after the death of his brother. The team brings the guitar back to the Waverider, but begins seeing a ghostly presence. They secure the Death Totem, and convince Elvis to continue pursuing music. Amaya plays Nate music from Zambesi, making the box containing the Death Totem shake.
48	15	"Necromancing the Stone"	April Mullen	Grainne Godfree & Morgan Faust	March 19, 2018	T13.20615	1.25
Sara is enticed to open the box and wear the Death Totem; her body again falls under Mallus' control, and her mind is trapped in the demon's realm. Ava and Gary track down Constantine for help. The Legends unsuccessfully try to stop Mallus-Sara. In Mallus' domain, Sara sees visions of what made her the woman she is as Nora tries to convince her to join Mallus. Learning that Sara is using the Death Totem, Constantine tries to enter Mallus' realm to take her place; Mallus blocks him. Amaya convinces Mick to wield the Fire Totem, which stuns Mallus-Sara. Ava rips off the Death Totem, tearfully tries to get Sara to fight back and places her hand on her chest (which Sara feels), convincing her to reject Nora's offer and reclaim her body. Fearing that she might hurt Ava, Sara breaks up with her to protect her.
49	16	"I, Ava"	Dean Choe	Ray Utarnachitt & Daphne Miles	March 26, 2018	T13.20616	1.28
Sara considers leaving the team after her breakup with Ava, but learns from Gary that Ava has not been to work in several days. Sara, Ray, and Gary travel to Ava's home and discover that Ava's "parents" are paid actors. The three travel to 2213, where they learn that Ava is a clone mass-produced by a conglomerate. Apprehended by Ava clones, they are saved by the original Ava (who did not know she was a clone; her memory was wiped by the Time Bureau). Zari teaches Mick to use the Fire Totem. Amaya (in a temporary truce with Kuasa) reclaims her totem, but Nate is captured by Damien. Damien says that he misses Nora and fake-tortures Nate, but is caught by Nora. Amaya, Wally, and Kuasa rescue Nate and confront Nora, but Nora rips the Water Totem out of Kuasa and kills her. Driven by grief and guilt, Amaya returns to 1992 Zambesi to change her family's fate. Ava and Sara realize that Rip deleted Ava's file from the Bureau, and decide to find out why.
50	17	"Guest Starring John Noble"	Ralph Hemecker	Keto Shimizu & James Eagan	April 2, 2018	T13.20617	1.23
The Legends stop Gorilla Grodd from killing future president Barack Obama in the 1980s, preventing another anachronism and delaying Mallus' release. Damien realizes that Nora will be killed when Mallus is released, and allies himself with the Legends. By getting actor John Noble to impersonate Mallus' voice, the team tricks Nora into the Waverider and contains her. Ava asks Rip if he knows that she was a clone; Rip says that she is the 12th Ava clone he has recruited because she is a talented agent. Amaya returns to 1992 Zambesi to change history and secure her family's future. Nate, instead of trying to convince her to return, helps her. Sara decides to allow this, causing the final anachronism that will free Mallus after concluding that the only way to stop the demon is to release him. She gives Damien the Death Totem, and the rest of the team wields their individual totems. Damien realizes that Nora is still alive in Mallus and releases Grodd to destroy Zambesi, preventing Mallus' release. Nate subdues Grodd with the Earth Totem, allowing Mallus to break out of his prison and kill Nora.
51	18	"The Good, the Bad and the Cuddly"	Dermott Downs	Marc Guggenheim & Phil Klemmer	April 9, 2018	T13.20618	1.41
Mallus demands that the Legends hand over the six totems. Rip sacrifices himself to allow the team to flee to the town of Salvation in the Old West. An army of Romans, Vikings, and pirates arrives, threatening to destroy the town unless the Legends surrender the totems. Ray and Damien travel to when Mallus is released; Damien frees Nora from Mallus' hold, causing him to kill Damien instead of Nora. In the Old West, the Legends ally with Jonah Hex, Helen of Troy, Jax, Nora, and an alternate Kuasa, and save the town from the army. Mallus arrives for the totems. Sara, Mick, Amaya, Nate, Zari, and Wally combine the totems' energies to create the ultimate warrior: a large Beebo, who kills Mallus. Nora is arrested by the Time Bureau, but Ray helps her escape. Amaya returns to Zambesi, but keeps her memories. The Legends' vacation in 2018 Aruba is interrupted when Constantine arrives, revealing that Mallus is not the only demon who escaped.

== Cast and characters ==
=== Main ===
- Victor Garber as Martin Stein / Firestorm (Note: Garber is credited through "Crisis on Earth-X, Part 4". Garber also plays as Martin's great-great grandfather, Sir Henry Stein.)
- Brandon Routh as Ray Palmer / Atom
- Caity Lotz as Sara Lance / White Canary
- Franz Drameh as Jefferson "Jax" Jackson / Firestorm (Note: Drameh is credited through "Beebo the God of War" and as a special guest star in "The Good, the Bad and the Cuddly".)
- Maisie Richardson-Sellers as Amaya Jiwe / Vixen
- Amy Louise Pemberton as Gideon (voice)
- Tala Ashe as Zari Tomaz (Note: Ashe is first credited in "Zari".)
- Keiynan Lonsdale as Wally West / Kid Flash (Note: Lonsdale is first credited as a guest star in "Aruba-Con" and "Here I Go Again" before being promoted to the main cast starting with "The Curse of the Earth Totem".)
- Nick Zano as Nate Heywood / Steel
- Dominic Purcell as Mick Rory / Heat Wave

=== Recurring ===
- Arthur Darvill as Rip Hunter
- Christina Brucato as Lily Stein
- Jes Macallan as Ava Sharpe
- Adam Tsekhman as Gary Green
- Hiro Kanagawa as Wilbur Bennett
- Tracy Ifeachor as Kuasa
- Joy Richardson as Amaya Jiwe's ancestor
- Neal McDonough as Damien Darhk
- Courtney Ford as Nora Darhk
- John Noble voices Mallus
  - Noble also appears as himself
- Matt Ryan as John Constantine

=== Guests ===
- Nils Hognestad as King Arthur
- Simon Merrells as Julius Caesar
- Billy Zane as P. T. Barnum
- Jack Fisher as young Ray Palmer
- Susie Abromeit as Sandy Palmer
- Echo Kellum as Curtis Holt / Mister Terrific
- Celia Massingham as Hedy Lamarr
- Bar Paly as Helen of Troy
- Peter Hall as Lyndon B. Johnson
- Evan Jones as Dick Rory
- David Sobolov voices Grodd
- Dianne Doan as Anh Ly
- Stephen Amell as Oliver Queen / Green Arrow and Dark Arrow
- David Ramsey as John Diggle
- Emily Bett Rickards as Felicity Smoak
- Tom Cavanagh as Eobard Thawne / Reverse-Flash and Harry Wells
- Chyler Leigh as Alex Danvers
- Candice Patton as Iris West
- Danielle Panabaker as Caitlin Snow / Killer Frost
- Carlos Valdes as Cisco Ramon / Vibe
- Rick Gonzalez as Rene Ramirez / Wild Dog
- Juliana Harkavy as Dinah Drake / Black Canary
- Melissa Benoist as Kara Danvers / Supergirl and Overgirl
- Grant Gustin as Barry Allen / Flash
- Wentworth Miller as Leo Snart
- Russell Tovey as Ray Terrill / The Ray
- Isabella Hofmann as Clarissa Stein
  - Emily Tennant played a younger version of the character
- Graeme McComb as young Martin Stein (Note: McComb previously portrayed this version of the character in "Pilot, Part 2" (2016) and "Compromised" (2016).)
- Thor Knai as Leif Erikson
- Katia Winter as Freydís Eiríksdóttir
- Madeleine Arthur as young Nora Darhk
- Jonathan Cake as Blackbeard
- Luke Bilyk as Elvis Presley
- Geoffrey Blake as Lucious Presley
- Violett Beane as Jesse Wells
- Matthew MacCaull as Henry Heywood
- Erica Tazel as Esi Jiwe
- Lovell Adams-Gray as Barack Obama
- Johnathon Schaech as Jonah Hex

== Production ==
In January 2017, before the second season's conclusion, Legends of Tomorrow was renewed by The CW. Later that year, the season was given an 18-episode order. Filming began on July 6, 2017, and ended in February 2018. Season three has a genre shift, from science fiction to fantasy, and a change in tone; it is lighter than the previous two seasons. Showrunner Phil Klemmer described the season as "more in the world of the occult and monsters". Co-creator Marc Guggenheim said that he wanted to have the Legends visit new locations, including Golden-Age Hollywood and Victorian London.

The character Mallus serves as the season primary villain. As opposed to the villains of seasons one and two, Mallus was an original character created for the series rather than adapted from DC Comics. The character Gorilla Grodd serves as an secondary antagonist. He was written more sympathetically after his defeat in The Flash (as seen in the "Gorilla City" two-part episode). Damien Darhk again acted as a supporting antagonist.

In an interview with Collider Tala Ashe stated the season would revolve around mystical artifacts called totems.

=== Casting ===
==== Main characters ====
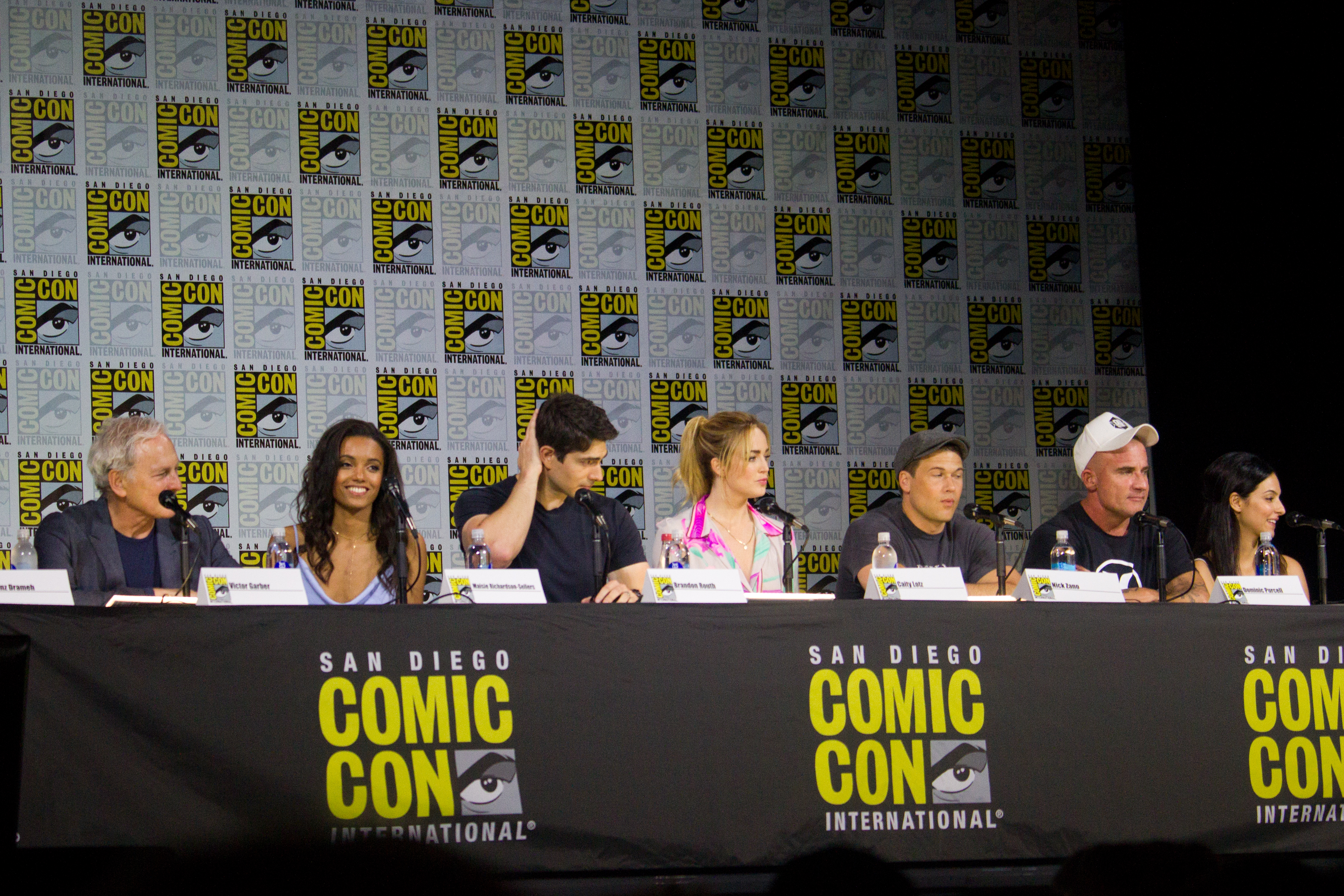
Partial cast of Legends of Tomorrow season 3 from left to right: Victor Garber, Maisie Richardson-Sellers, Brandon Routh, Caity Lotz, Nick Zano, Dominic Purcell, Tala Ashe

Returning series regulars from the previous season included Victor Garber, Brandon Routh, Caity Lotz, Franz Drameh, Maisie Richardson-Sellers, Amy Pemberton, Nick Zano and Dominic Purcell as Martin Stein, Ray Palmer, Sara Lance, Jefferson Jackson, Amaya Jiwe, Gideon, Nate Heywood and Mick Rory, respectively. They were joined by Tala Ashe and Keiynan Lonsdale playing Zari Tomaz and Wally West, respectively. Guggenheim explained that part of the motivation for adding the Muslim character, Zari Tomaz, to the series was the "political climate" in the United States after the 2016 elections. For the episode "Here I Go Again", Amy Pemberton appeared as Gideon, unlike most episodes in which she voiced the character. Lonsdale had been a regular on The Flash.

It was the only season in which Lonsdale was a regular; he left after the season finale, citing a desire for other acting opportunities. This was the final season in which Garber and Drameh were regulars; Garber left in "Crisis on Earth X, Part 4", followed by Drameh in the following episode. While Garber wanted to resume his career in Broadway theater; Drameh's exit was a creative decision, and he returned in the season-finale "The Good, the Bad and the Cuddly". Richardson-Sellers's character, Amaya Jiwe, left in the season finale. However, in the following season, Richardson-Sellers portrayed a new character named Charlie.

==== Recurring and guest stars ====
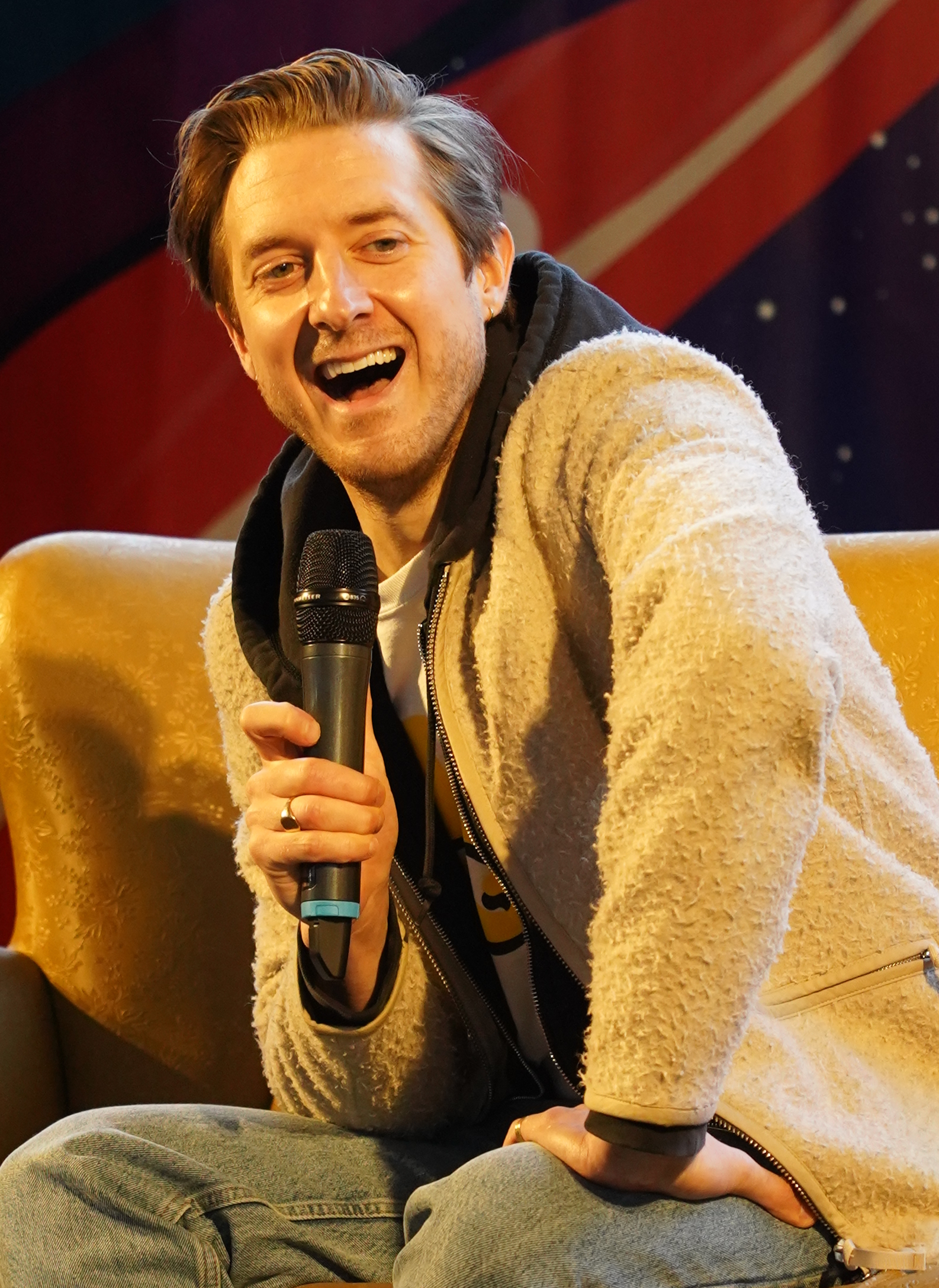
Arthur Darvill (left), who starred in the first two season, played a recurring role as Rip Hunter.

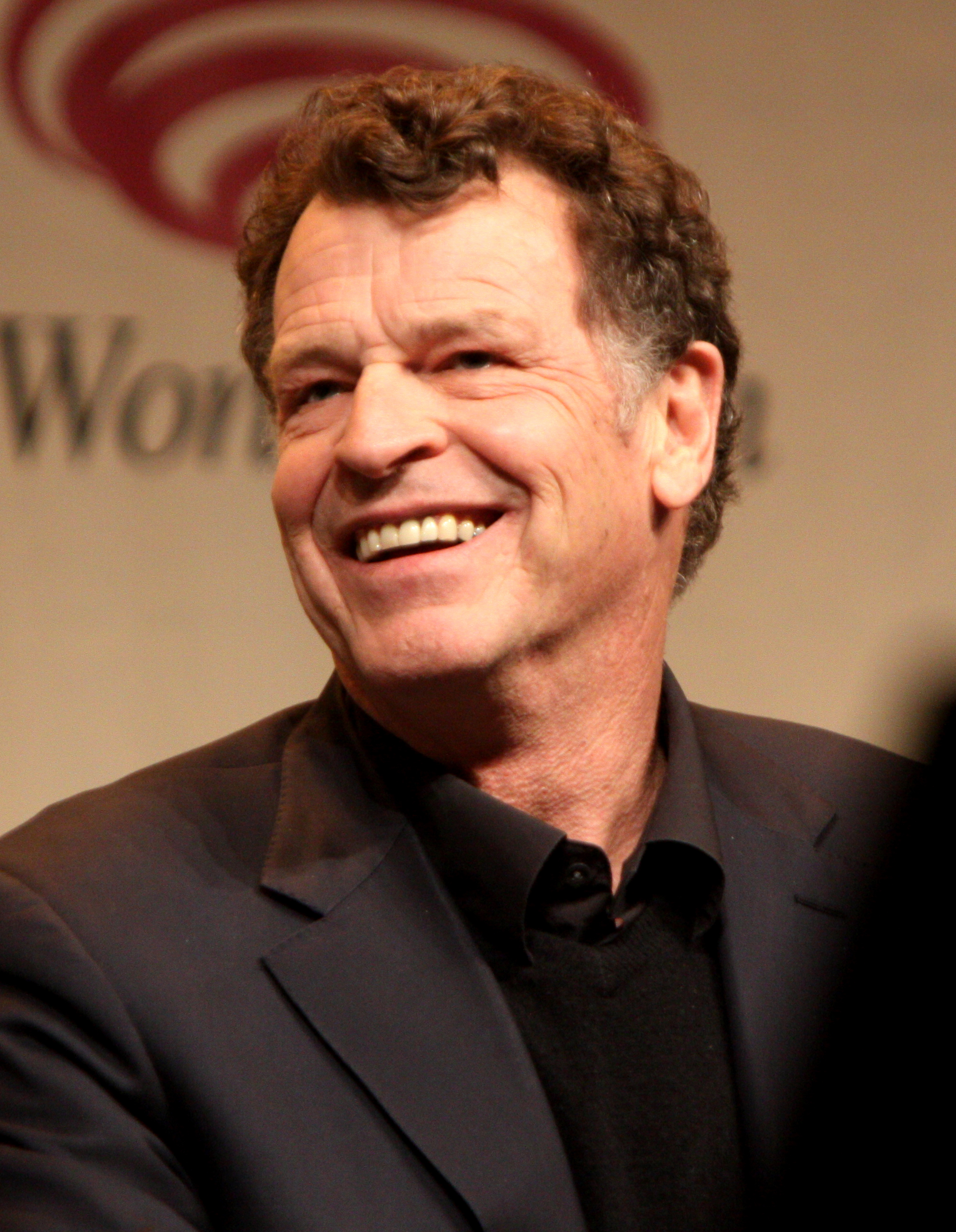
John Noble (right) voices Mallus the season's primary antagonist.

Arthur Darvill, who played Rip Hunter in the main cast during the first two seasons, was a recurring character this season. Several actors returned in their roles from other Arrowvverse series as recurring characters, such as Neal McDonough as Damien Darhk, David Sobolov as the voice of Grodd, and Christina Brucato as Lily Stein. Tracy Ifeachor was cast as Jiwe's granddaughter Kuasa, replacing Anika Noni Rose, who voiced the character in the animated web series Vixen. Courtney Ford replaced Tuesday Hoffman as Damien's daughter, Nora, and Ford became a regular the following season. Sellers' mother, Joy Richardson, was a recurring character as Jiwe's vision-quest ancestor. Matt Ryan played John Constantine after playing the character in the canceled NBC series Constantine. Ryan became a series regular the following season. Wentworth Miller (who played Leonard Snart as a regular in season one and a recurring character in season two) returned to play the character's Earth-X doppelganger, Leo Snart / Citizen Cold. Jes Macallan, Adam Tsekhman and Hiro Kanagawa recurred as Time Bureau agents Ava Sharpe, Gary Green and Wilbur Bennett, respectively, and Macallan became a regular the following season.

John Noble voiced the season primary antagonist Mallus. The character's true form is not revealed until the penultimate-episode "Guest Starring John Noble". In that episode, Noble also portrayed a fictionalized version of himself.

== Release ==
The third season of Legends of Tomorrow aired on The CW in the U.S. weekly from October 10 through December 5, 2017, when it took a mid-season break. It returned on February 12, 2018, and concluded on April 9 of that year. The season was made available for streaming on Netflix in late April 2018, soon after the season finale aired. It was released on DVD and Blu-ray on September 25, 2018.

=== Crossover ===
In May 2017, CW president Mark Pedowitz announced plans for a four-show Arrowverse crossover event consisting of Supergirl, The Flash, Legends of Tomorrow, and Arrow. The crossover, Crisis on Earth-X, began with Supergirl and a special airing of Arrow on November 27, 2017, and concluded with back-to-back airings of The Flash and Legends of Tomorrow on November 28.

== Reception ==
=== Ratings ===
The season high in live viewership was "Crisis on Earth-X, Part 4", with 2.80 million viewers, and the season low was "No Country for Old Dads"'s 1.19 million viewers. In seven-day DVR viewership, "Crisis on Earth-X, Part 4" had an additional 1.82 million viewers for a total of 4.62 million. The total season low was "Amazing Grace", with 2.03 million viewers. Overall, the season averaged 2.37 million viewers per episode.

Viewership and ratings per episode of Legends of Tomorrow season 3
No.	Title	Air date	Rating/share (18–49)	Viewers (millions)	DVR (18–49)	DVR viewers (millions)	Total (18–49)	Total viewers (millions)
1	"Aruba-Con"	October 10, 2017	0.6/3	1.71	0.4	1.14	1.0	2.85
2	"Freakshow"	October 17, 2017	0.5/2	1.58	0.4	0.97	0.9	2.55
3	"Zari"	October 24, 2017	0.5/2	1.43	0.4	0.95	0.9	2.38
4	"Phone Home"	October 31, 2017	0.4/2	1.38	0.5	1.04	0.9	2.42
5	"Return of the Mack"	November 7, 2017	0.5/2	1.52	0.4	1.02	0.9	2.54
6	"Helen Hunt"	November 14, 2017	0.5/2	1.53	0.5	1.06	1.0	2.59
7	"Welcome to the Jungle"	November 21, 2017	0.5/2	1.49	0.4	1.08	0.9	2.57
8	"Crisis on Earth-X, Part 4"	November 28, 2017	0.9/4	2.80	0.8	1.82	1.7	4.62
9	"Beebo the God of War"	December 5, 2017	0.6/2	1.61	—N/a	0.99	—N/a	2.61
10	"Daddy Darhkest"	February 12, 2018	0.5/2	1.51	—N/a	—N/a	—N/a	—N/a
11	"Here I Go Again"	February 19, 2018	0.4/2	1.40	—N/a	—N/a	—N/a	—N/a
12	"The Curse of the Earth Totem"	February 26, 2018	0.4/2	1.51	0.3	0.77	0.7	2.28
13	"No Country for Old Dads"	March 5, 2018	0.4/2	1.19	—N/a	0.86	—N/a	2.05
14	"Amazing Grace"	March 12, 2018	0.4/2	1.26	0.3	0.78	0.7	2.03
15	"Necromancing the Stone"	March 19, 2018	0.4/2	1.25	0.3	0.85	0.7	2.10
16	"I, Ava"	March 26, 2018	0.4/2	1.28	—N/a	0.77	—N/a	2.04
17	"Guest Starring John Noble"	April 2, 2018	0.4/2	1.23	0.3	0.80	0.7	2.04
18	"The Good, the Bad, and the Cuddly"	April 9, 2018	0.4/2	1.41	0.3	0.74	0.7	2.16

=== Critical response ===
On the review aggregator website Rotten Tomatoes, 88% of 36 critics' reviews are positive, with an average rating of 7.9/10. The website's consensus reads: "DC's Legends of Tomorrow lightens up the tone in its third season while spotlighting adventurous plots and a distinct sense of humor." Critics praised the season for its lighter tone and overall cast, with several calling it the best one to date.

Vox's Sara Ghaleb wrote, "The corner of The CW's Arrowverse became its best self in season three". Ghaleb described the episode as goofy and silly; the premise of the plot seemed ridiculous, but it came together neatly. For Tell-Tale TV, Jennifer Ann rated the season 5/5 and felt that the season finale was a satisfying narrative conclusion. IGN's Jesse Scheeden said that the season was the best of the series so far, but had the worst episodes overall and rated it 8.1/10. Scheeden criticized the season's main villain, saying that Mallus did not properly pay off the buildup, and called the totem plot line "boring". However, he praised the team dynamic and the overall cast. Collider's Adam Virgona praised the season's transition from science fiction to fantasy.

Screen Rant's Kath Leroy listed the season as the seventh-best Arrowverse seasons in a ranking. She placed Legends of Tomorrow season 3 ahead of The Flash season five and behind Supergirl season five. It was the second-highest-placing Legends of Tomorrow season, behind season two. In Virgona ranking of all seven seasons, he placed season 3 ahead of season four and behind season seven. MovieWeb's Richard Fink placed the season third overall, ahead of season four and behind season two.

=== Accolades ===
Award nominations for Legends of Tomorrow season 3
Year	Award	Category	Nominee(s)	Result	Ref.
2018	Saturn Awards	Best Superhero Television Series	Legends of Tomorrow	Nominated	
2018	Teen Choice Awards	Choice TV Actress: Action	Caity Lotz	Nominated	
