= Hero High =

- Genre: Animation
- Country of origin: United States
- No. of seasons: 1
- No. of episodes: 26

Production
- Running time: 22 minutes
- Production company: Filmation

Original release
- Network: NBC
- Release: September 12, 1981 – March 6, 1982

Hero High is a cartoon and live action series created by Filmation that aired as part of NBC's The Kid Super Power Hour with Shazam! It was about a high school where young superheroes were taught how to use their powers and fight crime. Originally intended to be a new entry in Filmation's long-running line of Archie cartoon series, the 1981 series was altered at the last minute because the company's rights to the Archie characters had expired and new characters had to be created.

Twenty-six episodes were produced, with 13 eight-minute stories and 13 twelve-minute stories.

== Main characters ==
| Character | Acted and voiced by: | Powers/Abilities |
|---|---|---|
| A.W.O.L. | Lou Scheimer | Invisibility (partial or whole) |
| Brat-Man | Erika Scheimer | Seismic and concussive blasts through "super tantrums" |
| Captain California | Christopher Hensel | Flight via his semi-intelligent flying surfboard "Wipeout", "super-shine" smile |
| Dirty Trixie | Maylo McCaslin | "Dirty tricks" via gadgets in her "bag of tricks" |
| Giggler | Lou Scheimer | Laughing Hyena Mascot |
| Glorious Gal | Rebecca Perle | Flight, super strength, telepathy, clairvoyance (possibly other mental powers) |
| Misty Magic | Jere Fields | Mystical powers |
| Peter Penguin | Lou Scheimer | A penguin who could fly |
| Punk Rock | Johnny Venocour | Minor destructive sonic powers using a guitar and speakers. Super-speed while playing music (suggested in "Do the Computer Stomp") |
| Rex Ruthless | John Berwick | "Dirty tricks" via gadgets in his belt buckle. |
| Weatherman | Jim Greenleaf | Weather and natural disaster control, flight via clouds. Minor fire powers (suggested in "Off Her Rocker") |

=== The Hero High Singing Group ===
The actors who voice the Hero High cartoon characters perform onstage as their characters each week in live-action song-of-the-week and comedy-sketch segments during the program.

The Hero High Singing Group:

- Captain California: Lead Vocals
- Glorious Gal: Keyboards/Organ, Background Vocals
- Weatherman: Keyboards/Organ, Trumpet, Background Vocals
- Misty Magic: Tambourine, Background Vocals
- Dirty Trixie: Bass Guitar, Background Vocals
- Rex Ruthless: Drums, Background Vocals
- Punk Rock: Lead Guitar, Background Vocals

=== Guest characters ===
Occasionally, Captain Marvel and Mary Marvel from the Shazam! segments would appear as guest characters during the Hero High segments, along with Isis, an Egyptian superheroine originally created by Filmation for the 1975 series, The Secrets of Isis. Some of the Hero High characters would also appear during the Shazam! segments.

== Episodes ==
| No. | Title | Original release date |
|---|---|---|
| 1 | "The Art of Ballot" | September 12, 1981 |
| 2 | "What's News" | September 19, 1981 |
| 3 | "Rat Finx Rex" | September 26, 1981 |
| 4 | "Do the Computer Stomp" | October 3, 1981 |
| 5 | "Malt Shop Mayhem" | October 10, 1981 |
| 6 | "Boo Who" | October 17, 1981 |
| 7 | "Cover Twirl" | October 24, 1981 |
| 8 | "My Job Is Yours" | October 31, 1981 |
| 9 | "Girl of His Dreams" | November 7, 1981 |
| 10 | "The Not So Great Outdoors" | November 14, 1981 |
| 11 | "Off Her Rocker" | November 21, 1981 |
| 12 | "Follow the Litter" | November 28, 1981 |
| 13 | "Jog-A-Long" | December 5, 1981 |
| 14 | "He Sinks Seaships" | December 12, 1981 |
| 15 | "Starfire, Where Are You?" | December 19, 1981 |
| 16 | "The Captives" | December 26, 1981 |
| 17 | "High Rise Hijinx" | January 2, 1982 |
| 18 | "Track Race" | January 9, 1982 |
| 19 | "A Clone of His Own" | January 16, 1982 |
| 20 | "Game of Chance" | January 23, 1982 |
| 21 | "The Umpire Strikes Back" | January 30, 1982 |
| 22 | "The Human Fly" | February 6, 1982 |
| 23 | "The Big Bang Theory" | February 13, 1982 |
| 24 | "Law of the Pack" | February 20, 1982 |
| 25 | "A Fistful of Knuckles" | February 27, 1982 |
| 26 | "The Blow-Way Blimp" | March 6, 1982 |

== Home release ==
BCI Eclipse LLC (under its Ink & Paint classic animation entertainment label, under license from then-rightsholder Entertainment Rights) released Hero High: The Complete Series on DVD in Region 1 on May 8, 2007. The 2 disc set includes many special features. The episodes presented uncut, digitally remastered and in syndication order.

| DVD name | Ep # | Release date |
|---|---|---|
| Hero High: The Complete Series | 26 | May 22, 2007 |

Features:

- Full-length Audio Commentaries for episode "A Fistful of Knuckles" and the Kid Super-Power Hour wraparound segments and song.
- Hero High Spotlight interviews with actors, producers, writers and artists (55 minutes)
- "The Magic of Filmation" Documentary: A half-hour history of the animation studio, with producers, writers, animators, historians, and other Filmation personnel.
- Rare "Kid Super Power Hour" footage (approx. 20 minutes): the live-action opening credits, joke segments, and theme song.
- Hero High Art and Photo Gallery
- Booklet with Episode Guide and Trivia
- DVD-ROM Material: Scripts and Storyboards
- Trailers of other Ink & Paint releases
