= Tsili =

- Film poster
- Directed by: Amos Gitai
- Screenplay by: Amos Gitai; Marie-Jose Sanselme
- Based on: Tsili by Aharon Appelfeld
- Produced by: Michael Tapuach
- Starring: Sarah Adler; Meshi Olinski; Lea Koenig; Adam Tsekhman; Andrey Kashkar
- Cinematography: Giora Bejach
- Edited by: Isabelle Ingold
- Music by: Amit Poznansky; Alexej Kotchekov
- Production companies: Agav Films; Trikita Entertainment
- Distributed by: Epicentre Films (France)
- Release dates: 1 September 2014 (Venice); 12 August 2015 (France)
- Running time: 88 minutes
- Countries: Israel; Russia; Italy; France
- Languages: Yiddish; Ukrainian; Polish; German; Russian

Tsili (Hebrew: צילי) is a 2014 Israeli drama film directed by Amos Gitai and based on the novel of the same name by Aharon Appelfeld. It was screened at the 71st Venice International Film Festival in an out of competition slot.

The screenplay is based on the novel The Shirt and the Stripes by Aharon Appelfeld. The story follows a Holocaust survivor, a teenage girl in Europe, who struggles to survive alone in nature during World War II and her wandering after the war ends.

Lea Koenig narrates excerpts from Appelfeld's book in Yiddish.

The film was selected as the official entry at the Venice Film Festival and also participated in the Haifa International Film Festival.

== Plot ==
In 1942, twelve-year-old Tsili is left behind by her family, who flee their village as the war arrives, entrusting her to guard their home. To survive, Tsili conceals her Jewish identity and leaves the village to search for food, finding work on farms where she endures exploitation and abuse for scraps of bread. After being beaten by some of her employers, she decides to escape to the mountains, hiding in the forests south of Czernowitz. In this war-torn landscape, Tsili builds a secluded refuge to evade the violence ravaging the valley below. Her hideout is eventually discovered by Marek, who speaks to her in Yiddish. Realizing they are both Jewish, they choose to stay together. One day, Marek heads to the village for supplies but never returns. As the war ends, Tsili leaves her refuge and encounters a group of survivors near the coast, all seeking a boat to take them to a new life.

== Cast ==
- Sarah Adler as Tsili
- Meshi Olinski as Young Tsili
- Adam Tsekhman as Marek
- Lea Koenig
- Andrey Kashkar
- Yelena Yaralova
