= The Secrets of Isis =

American live-action superhero television series

- Title card
- Also known as: Isis
- Genre: Adventure; Drama; Superhero
- Developed by: Marc Richards
- Starring: Joanna Cameron; Brian Cutler; Joanna Pang; Ronalda Douglas
- Theme music composer: Yvette Blais; Jeff Michael
- Country of origin: United States
- Original language: English
- No. of seasons: 2
- No. of episodes: 22

Production
- Executive producers: Norm Prescott; Lou Scheimer; Dick Rosenbloom
- Producer: Arthur H. Nadel
- Running time: 22 minutes
- Production company: Filmation

Original release
- Network: CBS
- Release: September 6, 1975 – October 23, 1976

Related
- Shazam!

The Secrets of Isis, originally broadcast as Isis, is an American live-action superhero television series produced by Filmation from 1975 to 1976 for CBS's Saturday morning lineup. The series was renamed The Secrets of Isis in syndication.

The program was the first weekly American live-action television series with a female superhero lead character, debuting on September 6, 1975, predating the weekly debuts of both The Bionic Woman (January 14, 1976) and Wonder Woman (April 21, 1976). In the series, Isis (Joanna Cameron) is the alter ego of Andrea Thomas, a seemingly normal schoolteacher, who transforms into the Egyptian goddess when presented with crises a mere mortal cannot resolve.

Isis and its companion series Shazam! had crossover episodes where Captain Marvel and Isis would appear in each other's shows. Since then DC Comics has adopted the character of Isis into their mainstream continuity for modern comics.

== Premise ==
Joanna Cameron as Isis in The Secrets of Isis

Isis starred Joanna Cameron as Andrea Thomas, a science teacher at Larkspur High School who found an ancient mystical gold amulet, the "Tutmose amulet", on an archeological dig in Egypt. The Isiac amulet, which resembled the headdress of Hathor, had originally belonged to Queen Hatshepsut, an Ancient Egyptian pharaoh. The amulet gave the wearer (specifically, Hatshepsut and her descendants, of which Andrea was one) "the powers of the animals and the elements", which would be bestowed upon such wearer by the goddess Isis whenever it was exposed and her name invoked. Whenever Isis was needed, Andrea would reveal the Isiac amulet (which she wore as an everyday necklace) and recite an incantation—"Oh mighty Isis"—transforming her into the goddess/super-heroine.

The series co-starred Brian Cutler as fellow teacher Rick Mason who acted as Andrea's potential love interest, Joanna Pang as student Cindy Lee, and Albert Reed as Dr. Barnes, the school principal. In Season 2, Ronalda Douglas joined the cast as Rennie Carol, replacing the Cindy character. Guest stars on the show included Mike Lookinland, Debralee Scott, Leigh McCloskey, Phil Bruns, Mark Lambert, Steven Paul, Thomas Carter, Colleen Camp, Johnny Doran, William Engesser, Laurette Spang, Tommy Norden, Victor Sen Yung, Russ Marin and Christopher Norris.

Three episodes of the series featured crossover appearances by Captain Marvel (of the show's companion series, Shazam!). Likewise, three episodes of Shazam! featured Joanna Cameron as Isis.

Most of the program's storylines involved Isis coming to the rescue of high school students who found themselves in danger due to unwise choices. A notable exception was the two-part series finale, "Now You See It...", and, "...Now You Don't", which had an espionage-related plotline revealing that Rick Mason has been working secretly for the US government on a weather-making machine. This two-parter introduced a trio of crime-fighting teens, The Super-Sleuths; the double episode was intended as a backdoor pilot for a Super-Sleuths series, which never materialized.

The Secrets of Isis often "broke the fourth wall", with Isis/Andrea winking at the camera or otherwise acknowledging the audience at pertinent moments in a story. In signature Filmation fashion, each episode featured an epilogue with Isis directly addressing the camera and imparting a moral lesson derived from the preceding events of that episode. These moral-message segments were later deleted from syndication prints.

== Powers and abilities ==
Isis displays a vast array of superpowers, usually invoked through incantation of a rhyming couplet. For example, Isis can take flight by reciting "O zephyr winds which blow on high / Lift me now so I can fly". Among her many powers, she exhibits superhuman strength, command of the elements (earth, air, fire, and water), and control of the weather. She can control the molecular density of her body and other matter, passing herself through walls, and in one instance, causing a car to pass unharmed through a road grader. She can divine the recent past, which is manifested for the viewer in the jewel of her diadem. Isis can cause living things, including trees and animals, to appear and disappear at will. She can increase local gravity, and stop and reverse the flow of time.

Isis's superhuman abilities are limited when in her Andrea Thomas form. She is still able to communicate telepathically with her pet crow, Tut, and in one instance, the reflection of light off her amulet restored a forgotten memory to a person.

== Episodes ==
Season	Episodes	Originally released	
Season	Episodes	First released	Last released
1	15	September 6, 1975	December 13, 1975
2	7	September 11, 1976	October 23, 1976

=== Season 1 (1975) ===
No. overall	No. in season	Title	Directed by	Written by	Original release date
1	1	"The Lights of Mystery Mountain"	Hollingsworth Morse	Russell Bates	September 6, 1975
A rash of UFO sightings leads Isis to an unscrupulous real estate developer.
2	2	"Fool's Dare"	Hollingsworth Morse	David Dworski	September 13, 1975
Cindy Lee enters a scrap yard on a dare and stumbles into a ring of car thieves. Guest starring Charles Cyphers.
3	3	"Spots of the Leopard"	Arnold Laven	James Schmerer	September 20, 1975
Isis helps an ex-convict accused by his own parole officer of a jewel robbery. Because of the man's shady reputation, not even his own daughter (guest star Debralee Scott) knows what or who to believe...or to not believe.
4	4	"The Sound of Silence"	Arnold Laven	Sid Morse	September 27, 1975
To get money for a car, a student steals a dangerous force field generator.
5	5	"Rockhound's Roost"	Arnold Laven	Robert F. Joseph	October 4, 1975
On a rock-hunting expedition, two students find themselves face-to-face with an angry bear. Guest starring Thomas Carter and Steven Paul.
6	6	"Lucky"	Hollingsworth Morse	Ann Udell	October 11, 1975
The loss of his dog leads a boy into danger as he learns about life and death.
7	7	"Bigfoot"	Arthur H. Nadel	J. Michael Reaves	October 18, 1975
A student looking for the legendary Bigfoot instead finds a giant man who shuns humanity.
8	8	"How to Find a Friend"	Hollingsworth Morse	Henry Colman	October 25, 1975
A boy tries to make a friend by giving an older boy his father's dangerous antique gun. Guest starring Mike Lookinland and Tommy Norden.
9	9	"The Show Off"	Arnold Laven	David Wise; Kathleen Barnes	November 1, 1975
An escaped gorilla menaces the Science Club's camping trip. Guest starring Harry Gold (Brandy, Missy, and Tracey's dad).
10	10	"The Outsider"	Hollingsworth Morse	David Dworski; Susan Dworski	November 8, 1975
A new student is framed for the theft of a rival school's mascot.
11	11	"No Drums, No Trumpets"	Hollingsworth Morse	Arthur H. Nadel	November 15, 1975
Exploring a ghost town lands Andrea and her students in the clutches of a robbery gang. Christopher Norris, later of Trapper John, M.D., guest stars.
12	12	"Funny Gal"	Hollingsworth Morse	Sid Morse	November 22, 1975
An insecure overweight girl running for student council steals Mr. Mason's boat as a publicity stunt. Isis must call upon Captain Marvel to help with the rescue. Guest starring John Davey as Captain Marvel.
13	13	"Girl Driver"	Arnold Laven	David Wise; Kathleen Barnes	November 29, 1975
A girl competes with her male rival in a road rally for the presidency of the Car Club, but his cheating puts them in danger. Guest starring Susan Lawrence (of Dr. Shrinker fame).
14	14	"Scuba Duba"	Arnold Laven	Sid Morse	December 6, 1975
A student in Mr. Mason's scuba diving class disregards safety rules and Isis must rescue him when he is trapped underwater. Guest starring Brian Byers and Eileen Chesis.
15	15	"Dreams of Flight"	Hollingsworth Morse	David Dworski; Susan Dworski	December 13, 1975
A young girl stands up to her brother when he opposes her competing in a model airplane competition. Guest starring Cynthia Avila, Paul Hinckley, Tom Williams, and Fabian Gregory.

=== Season 2 (1976) ===
No. overall	No. in season	Title	Directed by	Written by	Original release date
16	1	"Seeing Eye Horse"	Earl Bellamy	Peter L. Dixon; Sarah Dixon	September 11, 1976
A boy blinded in a riding accident must learn to trust a new guide horse when his family farm is threatened by fire. Guest starring George Elliot, Kathleen O'Malley, and James Griffith. The episode was also released as a View-Master stereoscopic set.
17	2	"The Hitchhiker"	Earl Bellamy	Sid Morse	September 18, 1976
A girl learns a lesson about the dangers of hitchhiking when the boy she rides with loses control of his car. Guest starring Barry Miller.
18	3	"The Class Clown"	Hollingsworth Morse	Arthur Nadel; Norman Cameron	September 25, 1976
A new student's practical jokes endanger his fellow students.
19	4	"The Cheerleader"	Hollingsworth Morse	Sid Morse	October 2, 1976
A girl (Laurette Spang) cheats on her chemistry exam and frames a fellow cheerleader (Colleen Camp) in her desperation to become number one.
20	5	"Year of the Dragon"	Hollingsworth Morse	Ann Udell	October 16, 1976
A Chinese-American girl learns to overcome her shame of her immigrant father's (Victor Sen Yung) adherence to traditional customs.
21	6	"Now You See It..." (Part 1)	Arthur Nadel	Arthur Nadel (story); Len Janson and Chuck Menville (teleplay)	October 23, 1976
Rick is framed for the theft of part of a top-secret government device that can control the weather. Guest starring John Davey as Captain Marvel and Craig Wasson as "Feather".
22	7	"...Now You Don't" (Part 2)	Arthur Nadel	Arthur Nadel; Len Janson; Chuck Menville (story); Len Janson and Chuck Menville (teleplay)	October 23, 1976
The weather machine thieves kidnap Rick to compel him to turn over the plans for the rest of the weather control machine. Guest starring John Davey as Captain Marvel and Craig Wasson as "Feather".

=== Chronological list of crossover episodes with Shazam! ===
- Shazam!, Season 2: "The Odd Couple" (Oct. 18, 1975)
- The Secrets of Isis, Season 1: "Funny Gal" (Nov. 22, 1975)
- Shazam!, Season 3: "Finders Keepers" (Oct. 2, 1976)
- Shazam!, Season 3: "Out of Focus" (Oct. 16, 1976)
- The Secrets of Isis, Season 2: "Now You See It ..." (Oct. 23, 1976)
- The Secrets of Isis, Season 2: "... Now You Don't" (Oct. 30, 1976)

== Broadcast history ==
Twenty-two episodes of Isis aired as part of The Shazam/Isis Hour on CBS from September 6, 1975, to October 23, 1976, with 15 episodes in the first season and seven in the second. The success of the show led to CBS returning and rerunning of the series starting in October 1977 for the 1977-78 season as The Secrets of Isis (replacement for a failed series). The character also appeared in three episodes of Shazam!.

== Home media ==
On July 24, 2007, American DVD distributor BCI Eclipse (under its Ink & Paint classic animation entertainment label) (under license from Entertainment Rights, then owners of the Filmation catalog) released The Secrets of Isis: The Complete Series as a 3-disc DVD box set in North America. The episodes were presented uncut, re-mastered and in their "known original airdate order", with extant copies of the "moral-message" segments cut for syndication presented as bonus features. The DVD includes the first issue of The Legend of Isis, a comic book published by Bluewater Productions, that debuted in 2007.

In September 2011, Classic Media released the first seven episodes as a one-disc set titled The Secrets of Isis.

DVD name	Episodes	Release date
The Secrets of Isis: The Complete Series	22	July 24, 2007
The Secrets of Isis	7	September 6, 2011

Savor Ediciones, S.A. released El Secreto: La Serie Completa as a 4-disc Region 2 DVD box set on July 15, 2009. Unlike the BCI set, this release only contains the episodes, no bonus features (not even the extant morals). Being a Region 2 release for Spain, the soundtrack is the dubbed Spanish version. The original English soundtrack was not included, even as a secondary option. The discs are encoded in the PAL video format, which is the same format as the currently-existing masters, so there is a small amount of additional picture area not present on the NTSC conversions released by BCI Eclipse.

== Other appearances ==
Isis later appeared in animated form (voiced by Diane Pershing) on the Freedom Force segment of Filmation's Tarzan and the Super 7 show in 1978. The animated Isis also made a guest appearance on the Filmation cartoon Hero High in 1981 (voiced by Linda Gary).

Despite sharing a program block with Shazam! and appearing in 1970s DC Comics publications, Isis was an original Filmation property. The rights to the character are today controlled by Universal Television, which owns the rights to most of the Filmation catalog and characters. A considerably reworked comic-book version of the character, still connected with Captain Marvel and given the alter-ego "Adrianna Tomaz" in honor of the television character, was introduced in the 2006 DC weekly maxi-series 52. This version of Isis becomes the wife of Captain Marvel's nemesis Black Adam, attempting to reform him before her death and resurrection later drive both Adam and Isis into villainy.

Grammnet, actor/producer Kelsey Grammer's production company, has reportedly obtained the rights to produce a film based on the character, to be called The Legend of Isis.

Isis appeared in the season 10 episode "Isis" of the CW Network's Superman-based drama series, Smallville. Portrayed by Smallville actress Erica Durance, this version saw the amulet take over Lois Lane's body. Her portrayal included nods to The Shazam!/Isis Hour and the modern character.

The character of Zari Tomaz on The CW series Legends of Tomorrow, is inspired by the TV and comic versions of Isis, using a mystic amulet for her powers.
