= Zari Tomaz and Zari Tarazi =

Legends of Tomorrow character

- Arrowverse character
- Tala Ashe as Zari Tomaz and Zari Tarazi in season 5 of Legends of Tomorrow
- First appearance: Zari Tomaz: "Zari"; Zari Tarazi: "Miss Me, Kiss Me, Love Me"
- Last appearance: Zari Tomaz: "Lowest Common Demoninator"; Zari Tarazi: "Knocked Down, Knocked Up"
- Created by: Phil Klemmer; Marc Guggenheim
- Based on: Andrea Thomas (seasons 3–4) by; Lou Scheimer; Norm Prescott; Richard Rosenbloom; Marc Richards; Adrianna Tomaz (seasons 5–7) by; Geoff Johns; Greg Rucka; Mark Waid; Grant Morrison
- Portrayed by: Tala Ashe; Gracelyn Awad Rinke (young)

In-universe information
- Nicknames: Z; Dragon Girl
- Occupation: Zari Tomaz: Hacktivist; Zari Tarazi: Social media influencer
- Affiliation: Legends of Tomorrow
- Family: Nasreen Tarazi (mother); Behrad Tarazi (brother)
- Significant others: Nate Heywood (Zari Tomaz); DJ S'Moore Money (Zari Tarazi; formerly); John Constantine (Zari Tarazi; formerly)
- Religion: Islam
- Nationality: Persian-American

Zari Tomaz and Zari Tarazi (/zɑːri/) are fictional characters portrayed by Tala Ashe in The CW's Arrowverse franchise, primarily the television series Legends of Tomorrow. Loosely inspired by the characters Andrea Thomas and Adrianna Tomaz, both of whom use the moniker Isis, Zari was created by Phil Klemmer and Marc Guggenheim, with the Tomaz incarnation introduced in the series' third season episode "Zari". She is a hacktivist from a dystopian 2042 and joins the time-travelling Legends of Tomorrow, assisting them on their numerous adventures through season four. Due to the events of the season four finale, Tomaz's history is changed in a way that she never lived in a dystopian future; after she is erased from reality, a new alternate timeline version of Zari introduced in season five, Tarazi, is instead a socialite and social media influencer before joining the Legends.

== Fictional character biographies ==
=== Zari Tomaz ===
Zari Tomaz is introduced in season three as a Muslim hacktivist living in 2042 Seattle, which is being ruled by a fascist A.R.G.U.S. who have banned metahumans and religion. She is wanted for multiple crimes, including practicing religion. The time-travelling Legends of Tomorrow arrive in 2042 via the Waverider and find Tomaz, who demands help in rescuing her brother from an A.R.G.U.S. black site. The Legends assent, Tomaz retrieves her brother's mystical amulet from the site, and admits to duping the Legends before flying away using the amulet. Ray Palmer pursues Tomaz to a place where her family was to rendezvous, but Tomaz finds it destroyed and her family not there. She tells Ray her brother was killed by A.R.G.U.S. who then took his amulet. The assassin Kuasa attacks Tomaz, but retreats when the Legends intervene. Mick Rory and Amaya Jiwe convince Tomaz to join the Legends, rather than remain a fugitive from A.R.G.U.S. Amaya explains that Tomaz's amulet is actually a totem, similar to her own. Tomaz tries hacking the Waverider's AI Gideon's system to find a way to prevent her home from being destroyed in the future, but fails. Gideon later tells Tomaz that she cannot do so without the Legends. Sara Lance assures Tomaz it might be possible to save her brother. To kill the demon Mallus, Tomaz, Sara, Mick, Amaya, Nate Heywood and Wally West use their totems to create an enlarged Beebo, and succeed.

In season four, Tomaz continues operating with the Legends, assisting them in capturing magical creatures called "fugitives", which have been released throughout time. She feels sympathy for one named Charlie, who later joins the Legends. After Tomaz is hired by the Time Bureau, she investigates Nate's father Hank and suspects he is embezzling Bureau funds to experiment on fugitives. Tomaz later realises her love for Nate, while Nate discovers his recently murdered father was, contrary to Tomaz's belief, not torturing fugitives but training them for a proposed theme park. Sara sends Tomaz and Nate on a mission to 1933, mainly to get them romantically involved. The mission ends with Tomaz and Nate admitting their love for each other, and the acquisition of a dragon egg. While Tomaz and Charlie infiltrate the Bureau to save the fugitives that Neron plans to abuse, the egg, accidentally left in Tomaz's childhood home, hatches in young Tomaz's possession. The dragon makes young Tomaz popular, inspiring the Legends to open Hank's proposed park to botch Neron's plans of painting all magical creatures as monsters. After Neron's defeat, by teaching tolerance, the Legends avert the dystopian 2042, creating a new timeline where Tomaz's brother Behrad Tarazi was never killed and Tomaz never acquired her totem, resulting in Behrad becoming part of the Legends instead of her.

In season five, it is revealed that, while she lives on in the World Between Worlds in the air totem, she can't co-exist with her other self for an extended period of time as the now-alive Behrad will die as a result of her timeline bleeding into the new one. In season six, she learns that she can switch places with her counterpart within the air totem allowing her to rejoin the Legends on a part-time basis. At the end of season seven, she retires from the Legends after they defeat Evil Gideon and save the life of Alun Thomas when Nate Heywood moves into the World Between Worlds in the air totem with her to maintain their relationship.

=== Zari Tarazi ===
In season five, Nate discovers that Tomaz, before being erased from the timeline, filmed a fail-safe video that would play for him if she ever disappeared. In the video, Tomaz asks him to find her. Nate encounters the new timeline's version of Zari, who is radically different; she is Zari Tarazi, a socialite and social media influencer. She realizes Behrad has been time-travelling without their parents' knowledge, and before she can expose him, he transports her to the Waverider. Tarazi escapes after briefly recollecting her hacking skills from the old timeline and is later attacked by serial killer Kathy Meyers, but combats her with spray before Kathy is taken down by Behrad. While seeing why Behrad has the family totem, Tarazi ultimately decides to stay with him and the Legends for a while. She later befriends team member Ava Sharpe, and starts recollecting more of her memories from the old timeline. Tarazi searches for answers as to why she is experiencing memories of the old timeline. She eventually finds Tomaz in the air totem and they talk about their different lives; reconciling their differences and granting Tarazi control of the totem once more. After Behrad is murdered by Atropos, Tarazi decides to stay by John Constantine until they get all the pieces of the Loom of Fate to resurrect him.

While Constantine tries using everyone's energy to summon the last piece of the Loom, a ring, he and Tarazi accidentally end up in 1918 when Constantine's house was a boarding house. Tarazi and Constantine check-in, and find several Encores (souls restored to life) sent by Lachesis are after the same ring. Tarazi and Constantine destroy the Encores, find the ring and return to the present. After the Legends acquire the Chalice of Dionysus, which will make a drinker immortal for a day and allow them to help Charlie use the Loom, everyone but Tarazi does so, allowing them to finally use the Loom. Tarazi also begins a relationship with Constantine; however, Atropos and Lachesis gain all pieces of the Loom and use it to rewrite reality, causing Tarazi, a resurrected Behrad and the Legends to be trapped in various TV shows. Tomaz emerges from the air totem and possesses Tarazi's body. After the Legends manage to break out of their shows, Charlie splits Zari between her Tarazi self and her Tomaz self to gain control of the Legends, but to no avail. Following Atropos and Lachesis' defeat, Tomaz realizes her existence is a temporal disturbance that endangers Behrad; her timeline where he dies, and Tarazi's timeline where he lives fight for control of Behrad's life, so she returns to the wind totem to save him.

In season six, Tarazi asks Behrad if she can use the Air Totem, but Behrad claims the totem chose him. Afterwards, Tomaz splits the totem into two so both Behrad and Tarazi can use them. Afterwards, Tarazi learns that Tomaz can exist without danger of being erased if Tarazi goes into the totem. The two are able to safely trade places, allowing Tomaz to resume her relationship with Nate. Tarazi later returns and struggles with her relationship with Constantine as he becomes addicted to dark magic. Though Constantine is killed by Bishop, he makes a deal with a demon to return to Earth, where he gives Tarazi a key and decides to walk his path alone, away from her.

In season seven, after being stranded in 1925 with the rest of the Legends, Tarazi helps them find Gwyn Davies, the founder of time travel and return home. During this time, she learns that the key Constantine gave to her gives her access to his pocket dimension in hell which is in the form of his manor and spends some time there getting over their breakup. After briefly switching places with Tomaz, she learns that they are being hunted by an evil version of Gideon. With help from Eobard Thawne, the Legends defeat Evil Gideon and take back the Waverider. After a brief retirement and a truce with the evil Gideon, she helps Gwyn save the life of his lover Alun Thomas with the Legends, altering a fixed point in time. When Nate chooses to leave the team, she gives her air totem to him, allowing him to move into the World Between Worlds in the air totem and allowing both him and her counterpart to retire from the Legends. When she returns to the Waverider, she is arrested by the Time Police alongside her team for breaking the timeline.

== Development ==
In June 2017, Tala Ashe joined the third season of Legends of Tomorrow as Zari Tomaz, initially described as a "Muslim-American woman from the year 2030 [sic] who lives in a world of contradictions [...] Fear, prejudice and a lack of care for the planet have forced Zari to become a "gray hat hacktivist." She lives a double life and doesn't realize that she has secret, latent powers derived from an ancient, mystical source." The character was loosely inspired by two characters using the moniker Isis: Andrea Thomas from the TV series The Secrets of Isis, and the DC Comics character Adrianna Tomaz, a reworking of Thomas. Zari was created by Phil Klemmer and Marc Guggenheim, who said it was "very important to me that certain elements from [The Secrets of Isis] were reflected." Guggenheim explained that part of the motivation for adding Zari to the series was the "political climate" in the United States after the 2016 elections. He said another reason was his sister-in-law, a Muslim, once telling him about "how difficult it is to be a Muslim-American in the current political climate." Gracelyn Awad Rinke portrays a younger Zari.

The producers decided not to give Zari the moniker Isis because of the sound-alike militant organization ISIS; instead, the character goes by the nickname Z, and a Halloween costume she wears in the episode "Phone Home" was inspired by the superhero costume worn by Thomas in The Secrets of Isis. Her actual superhero costume, introduced during the "Crisis on Earth-X" crossover event, has a yellow and gold color scheme. Zari served as the central character of the bottle episode "Here I Go Again". Ashe described Zari's initial relationship with Gideon as antagonistic because "Zari has messed with her operating system before, as a hacker", adding that she respects Sara as the Waverider's captain, and has a "a very sweet friendship" with Amaya, despite both of them having "lived a hundred years apart." The season four episode "Séance and Sensibility" explores Zari's romantic side, with Ashe explaining, "Given her tumultuous past and that she was always essentially fighting for the life of her and her family, love was on the back-burner. So we're going to see her start to grapple with that in a very big way." Like "Here I Go Again", it was also written as a Zari-centric episode, with Klemmer saying this was done because "she's such a tough nut to crack [...] She's not like [a] Jane Austen heroine, but she is like kind of defined by just how closely she guards her feelings."

The fifth season of Legends of Tomorrow introduces a different version of Zari, a social media influencer whose last name is Tarazi. Klemmer compared her to the Kardashian family because of how she runs her "giant media empire and personal brand", while her "brother's been running around secretly saving the world [...] all Zari 1.0 wanted was for her brother not to die and her parents not to die and her future to not be this terrible, intolerant place, and she succeeded at all those things, but despite all of the things she fixed, their relationship isn't as great as it is between many siblings. She was like a child star, effectively, and Behrad had to live under her shadow." Ashe later said, "I had spent some time developing Zari 1.0 and really felt she had come a long way and had opened her heart at the end of the previous season, and then to lose her I think was hard for the fans [...] Even though I was excited, as an actor, by the challenge of playing such a different take on the character, I do feel like I resisted it for a little while [...] I feel like it took me a minute to find and accept and bond and submit to this new reality, and to the new Zari."

== Skills and abilities ==
Zari Tomaz is a skilled computer hacker. While she does not have any inherent superhuman powers, her amulet gives her the "power to blast and manipulate the wind". Zari Tarazi gains Tomaz's hacking skills through recollection of Tomaz's skills.

== Reception ==
Reviewing the episode "Zari" in which the character is introduced, IGN's Jesse Schedeen described Zari as a "pretty generic hacker anti-hero who just happens to have possession of a mystical amulet." He added that "Nothing about her personality or background makes her a particularly compelling addition to the team" and Ashe did not exhibit "the screen presence necessary to stand out alongside the colorful cast of Legends. It's probably a good idea to throw a new wild card into this now-familiar team dynamic, but Zari needs to bring more to the table than she does here." However, The A.V. Club's Oliver Sava reacted more positively, saying, "Tala Ashe is a charismatic actress that sells the emotional moments of this episode's script, and she has strong chemistry with the rest of the group. She's intense, but not overly so, and she recognizes that this series doesn't demand an overly dramatic performance." Den of Geek's Jim Dandy said "Here I Go Again" was a "delight at every second. The entire episode hinged on Tala Ashe's performance, and she nailed it". Schedeen said that while the episode was not a high point for the third season, it was "nonetheless a solid bottle episode that provided some much-needed growth for the team's most recent recruit, Zari."

== See also ==
- List of Legends of Tomorrow characters
