= Adam Tsekhman =

Canadian actor

- Born: January 15, 1980 (age 46); Winnipeg, Manitoba, Canada
- Education: Wharton School of the University of Pennsylvania
- Alma mater: Columbia University
- Occupation: Actor
- Years active: 2006–present

Adam Tsekhman is a Canadian actor best known for his role as Gary Green on the American television series Legends of Tomorrow.

== Early life ==
Adam Tsekhman was born in Winnipeg, Manitoba, but raised in Toronto, Ontario. His parents were Ukrainian immigrants of Jewish descent who came to Canada in the early 1970s. While studying finance at the Wharton School of the University of Pennsylvania, he developed a passion for acting, and joined a theatre troupe one of his friends was working at. After graduating from Wharton, Tsekhman wanted to pursue a career in investment banking and attended an interview with Lehman Brothers, but changed his mind and went to Columbia University where he graduated with a Masters in Fine Arts in Theatre Acting.

== Career ==
After graduating from Columbia University, Tsekhman landed a role in the Russian TV series Zona. He received a best lead actor in a series nomination at the Monte-Carlo Television Festival, but lost to Kiefer Sutherland for 24. Tsekhman then moved to Los Angeles to work on other films and TV series. In 2014, he featured in the Yiddish-language film Tsili as a Jewish refugee named Marek. In 2017, Tsekhman was cast in the third season of The CW's Legends of Tomorrow as Gary Green. Initially intended to appear only for three episodes, he later became a recurring character, and was promoted to the main cast during its sixth season. In 2019, Tsekhman joined the thriller film Dreamland (later retitled Crisis) as an Armenian gangster named Armen.

== Filmography ==
=== Film ===
Year	Title	Role	Notes	Ref.
2014	Tsili	Marek		
2018	Dragged Across Concrete	Behzad		
2021	Crisis	Armen		
2026	Because of Cupid	Hal		

=== Television ===
Year	Title	Role	Notes	Ref.
2006	Zona	Dennis Warren		
2009	FlashForward	Vladimir Petrov		
2010	24	Suvarov's Aide		
2011	NCIS: Los Angeles	Grigore Comescu		
2012	Rizzoli & Isles	Steve Bogart		
2013	The Mentalist	Horatio Jones		
2014	You're the Worst	Venti		
2015	Bones	Mustache / Johnny		
2015	NCIS	Omar Hassan		
2016	Hawaii Five-0	Rasheed		
2017	2 Broke Girls	Pete		
2017	Transparent	Eyal		
2017–2022	Legends of Tomorrow	Gary Green	Recurring role (seasons 3–5); Main cast (season 6–7)	
2018	Supergirl	Gary Green	Episode: "Elseworlds, Part 3"	
2018	iZombie	Squirelly Guy	Episode: "Chivalry Is Dead"	
2018	Six	Yuri Petrov		
2019	The Twilight Zone	Officer Foster		

=== Video games ===
Year	Show	Role	Notes
2010	SOCOM U.S. Navy SEALs: Fireteam Bravo 3	Additional voices	
2015	Metal Gear Solid V: The Phantom Pain	Soldiers	
2019	Call of Duty: Modern Warfare	Russian soldiers	
2020	Call of Duty: Black Ops Cold War	Anton Charkov	
2022	Call of Duty: Modern Warfare II	Additional voices	
