= Tala Ashe =

Iranian-American actress

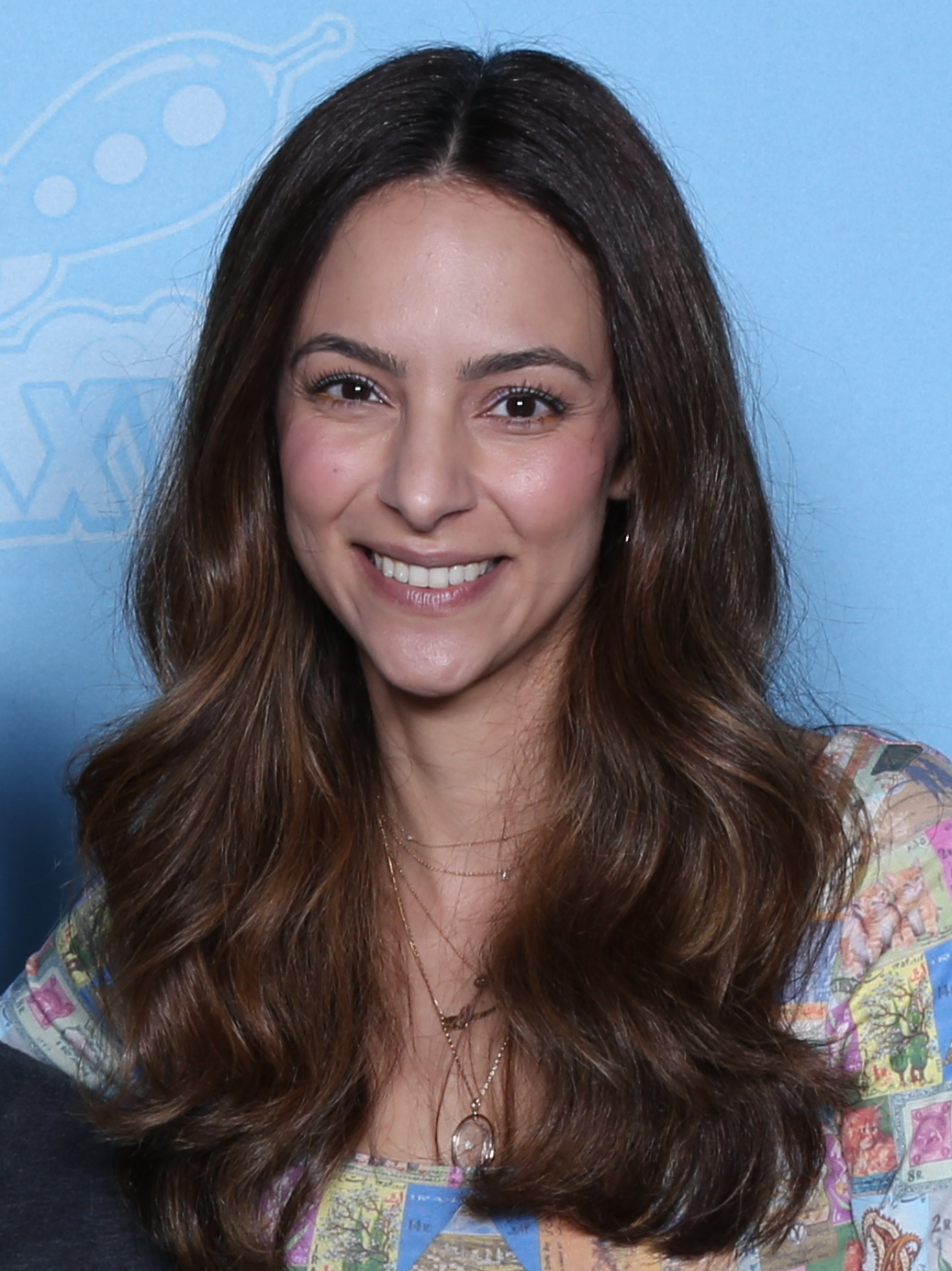
- Ashe in 2022
- Born: Talayeh Ashrafi; Tehran, Iran
- Education: Boston University (BFA)
- Occupation: Actress
- Years active: 2008–present
- Spouse: Raffi Barsoumian
- Website: www.instagram.com/talaashe/?hl=en

Talayeh Ashrafi (Persian: طلایه اشرفی;), known professionally as Tala Ashe, is an Iranian-American actress. She was nominated for a Tony Award for Best Featured Actress in a Play in 2024 and known for her roles on the television series Smash, The Girls on the Bus, Adults, American Odyssey, and As the World Turns, as well as her regular role as Zari Tomaz and Zari Tarazi on The CW superhero series Legends of Tomorrow.

Ashe has acted in many musical and play productions, including Broadway's English, for which she received nominations at the Tony Award for Best Featured Actress in a Play and at the Drama League Award for Distinguished Performance.

== Early life and education ==
Ashe was born in Tehran, Iran. She immigrated to the United States when she was nine months old. Ashe grew up in Powell, Ohio, just outside of the state capital Columbus. She participated in her high school theatre productions as both an actress and director.

Ashe received a BFA from Boston University's School of Theatre. She also trained at the London Academy of Music and Dramatic Art and the Upright Citizens Brigade Theatre in New York City.

== Career ==
Ashe has performed in numerous regional and Off-Broadway stage productions. Ashe's first screen credit is for her role as Nadia in the 2008 film Waiting in Beijing. She was credited as Tala Ashrafi, but is credited as Tala Ashe in all subsequent roles. She has made guest appearances on the series Law & Order, Law & Order: Criminal Intent, 30 Rock, and Covert Affairs. Ashe has also had recurring roles on Smash and American Odyssey. She was also a cast member on As the World Turns.

In 2017, Ashe joined the main cast of Legends of Tomorrow as Zari Tomaz. She took the lead for a bottle episode titled "Here I Go Again" and drew praise from critics and fans alike for her performance.

In 2022, Ashe was cast for the lead role of Elham on Off-Broadway debut play English at the Linda Gross Theatre. After playing the role in a number of theatres in the US, the play debuted on Broadway at the Roundabout Theatre Company's Todd Haimes Theatre in January 2025. Her performance gave her a Tony Award nomination for Best Featured Actress in a Play and a Drama League Award for Distinguished Performance.

== Personal life ==
Ashe is Iranian-American and holds dual citizenship. Her name, Talayeh, means "pioneer" in Persian and comes from the Shahnameh. In addition to English, she speaks fluent Persian. Along with her fellow Arrowverse actresses, Ashe is a founding member of Shethority, a project aimed at inspiring and uplifting women (inclusively defined).

== Filmography ==
Television and film roles
Year	Title	Role	Notes
2008	Waiting in Beijing	Nadia	Film; credited as Tala Ashrafi
2008	Law & Order	Madison	Episode: "Angelgrove"
2008	As the World Turns	Ameera Ali Aziz	Recurring role, 26 episodes
2011	Law & Order: Criminal Intent	Rebecca Landon	Episode: "Boots on the Ground"
2012	Smash	R.J. Quigley	Recurring role (season 1), 6 episodes
2015	American Odyssey	Anna Stone	Recurring role, 7 episodes
2017–2022	Legends of Tomorrow	Zari Tomaz and Zari Tarazi	Main role (season 3–7), 74 episodes
2024	The Girls on the Bus	Althea Abdi	Recurring role
2025	Adults	Hilary	Episode: "Roast Chicken"
2026	CIA	Leila Karimi	Episode: "Deep Cover" (S1E5)
2026	Little Brother	Nina	
2026	Maximum Pleasure Guaranteed	Jennifer	

== Stage ==
In addition to the following, Ashe has also performed in productions of Love's Labour's Lost (as Tala Ashrafi; Huntington Theatre Company), Age of Innocence (New York Arena), Autophagy (Drama League Director's Project), Twelfth Night (Actors' Shakespeare Project), and Pearls from Salt (Olney Theatre), among others.

=== Broadway productions ===
Year	Title	Role	Notes	Ref.
2025	English	Elham	Roundabout Theatre Company	

=== Off-Broadway productions ===
Year	Title	Role	Notes	Ref.
2011	Urge for Going	Jamila	The Public Theater	
2014	The Who & the What	Mahwish	Claire Tow Theater	
2016	Troilus and Cressida	Helen, Andromache	Delacorte Theater	
2017	The Profane	Emina	Playwrights Horizons	
2020; 2022	The Vagrant Trilogy	Abir	The Public Theater	
2023	Lunch Bunch	Mitra	The Play Company Theater	
2024	Breaking the Story	Nikki	Tony Kiser Theater	

=== Other productions ===
Year	Title	Role	Notes	Ref.
2009	Aftermath	Naimah	Solomon R. Guggenheim Museum, New York City	
2010	Welcome to Arroyo's	Lelly Santiago	Old Globe Theatre, San Diego, California	
2011	Again and Against	Dahlia	LAByrinth Summer Intensive, New York	
2012	Troilus and Cressida	Cressida, Cassandra	Oregon Shakespeare Festival, Ashland, Oregon	
2015	Head over Heels	Philoclea	Oregon Shakespeare Festival, Ashland, Oregon	
2015	The Happiest Song Plays Last	Shar	Oregon Shakespeare Festival, Ashland, Oregon	

== Awards and nominations ==
Award	Year	Category	Nominee	Result	Ref.
Drama Desk Award	2023	Outstanding Actress in a Play	English	Nominated	
Drama League Awards	2025	Outstanding Distinguished Performance	English	Nominated	
Obie Awards	2022	Special Citation	English	Won	
Tony Awards	2025	Best Performance by an Actress in a Featured Role in a Play	English	Nominated	
