= 1942 in comics =

Notable events of 1942 in comics.

== Events and publications ==
=== January ===
- January: Holyoke Publishing purchases the publishing rights to Cat-Man Comics and Captain Aero Comics from Helnit Publishing.
- 4Most Comics (1942 series) #1 - Novelty Press
- Action Comics (1938 series) #44 - DC Comics
- Adventure Comics (1938 series) #70 - DC Comics
- All-American Comics (1939 series) #34 - DC Comics
- All-Star Comics (1940 series) #8 - DC Comics: First appearance of Wonder Woman
- Batman (1940 series) #8 - DC Comics
- Big 3 (1940 series) #7 - Fox Feature Syndicate: Final Issue
- Bulletman (1941 series) #3 - Fawcett Comics
- Captain America Comics (1941 series) #10 - Timely Comics
- Captain Marvel Adventures (1941 series) #6 - Fawcett Comics
- Cat-Man Comics (1941 series) #6 - Holyoke Publishing
- Crack Comics (1940 series) #20 - Quality Comics
- Daring Mystery Comics (1940 series) #8 - Final issue, renamed Comedy Comics starting with issue #9.
- Detective Comics (1937 series) #59 - DC Comics
- Flash Comics (1940 series) #25 - DC Comics
- Marvel Mystery Comics (1939 series) #27 - Timely Comics
- Master Comics (1940 series) #22 - Fawcett Comics
- More Fun Comics (1936 series) #75 - DC Comics
- Mystery Men Comics (1939 series) #30 - Fox Feature Syndicate
- Sensation Comics #1 (1942 series) #1 - DC Comics
- Star Spangled Comics (1941 series) #4 - DC Comics
- Superman (1939 series) #14 - DC Comics
- Target Comics (1941 series) #11 - Novelty Press
- The Eagle (1941 series) #4 - Fox Feature Syndicate, Final Issue
- The Flame (1940 series) #8 - Fox Feature Syndicate, Final Issue
- U.S.A. Comics (1941 series) #3 - Timely Comics
- U.S. Jones (1941 series) #2 - Fox Feature Syndicate, Final Issue
- V...- Comics (1942 series) #1 - Fox Feature Syndicate
- Weird Comics (1940 series) #20 - Fox Feature Syndicate, Final Issue
- Whiz Comics (1940 series) #26 - Fawcett Comics
- Wonderworld Comics #33 - Fox Feature Syndicate, Final Issue

=== February ===
- February 10. In Italy, after the outbreak of the war with USA, Tuffolino, by Federico Petrocchi and Pier Lorenzo De Vita, replaces Topolino (Mickey Mouse), until then the only American comic tolerated by the Fascist censure. The new comic, a shameless plagiarism of the Disney original, with human characters instead of animals, lasts until December 1943.
- Action Comics (1938 series) #45 - DC Comics
- Adventure Comics (1938 series) #71 - DC Comics
- All-American Comics (1939 series) #35 - DC Comics
- All-Star Comics (1940 series) #9 - DC Comics
- Blue Beetle (1939 series) #11 - Fox Feature Syndicate
- Captain Aero Comics (1941 series) #2 - Holyoke Publishing
- Captain America Comics (1941 series) #11 - Timely Comics
- Captain Marvel Adventures (1941 series) #7 - Fawcett Comics
- Cat-Man Comics (1941 series) #7 - Holyoke Publishing
- Crack Comics (1940 series) #21 - Quality Comics
- Detective Comics (1937 series) #60 - DC Comics
- Dime Comics #1 - Leo Bachle reinvents the Canadian national personification Johnny Canuck as a superhero comic.
- Flash Comics (1940 series) #26 - DC Comics
- Green Mask (1940 series) #9 - Fox Feature Syndicate
- Jingle Jangle Comics #1 - Eastern Color
- Marvel Mystery Comics (1939 series) #28 - Timely Comics
- Master Comics (1940 series) #23 - Fawcett Comics
- More Fun Comics (1936 series) #76 - DC Comics
- Mystery Men Comics (1939 series) #31 - Fox Feature Syndicate, Final Issue
- Sensation Comics (1942 series) #2 — DC Comics: In this issue the Wonder Woman characters Etta Candy and Doctor Poison make their debut.
- Spy Smasher (1941 series) #3 - Fawcett Comics
- Star Spangled Comics (1941 series) #5 - DC Comics
- Target Comics (1941 series) #12 - Novelty Press
- Whiz Comics (1940 series) #27 - Fawcett Comics

=== March ===
- March 6: The Captain Marvel villain Ibac makes his debut.
- March 6: Fox Feature Syndicate goes bankrupt, canceling several titles with Blue Beetle moving to Holyoke Publishing (issues 11-30) until Fox regained Blue Beetle in 1944.
- March 11: Marten Toonder's Tom Poes story De Zieke Hertog marks the debut of Olivier B. Bommel's faithful butler Joost.
- March 15: The final episode of Tailspin Tommy, at this point drawn by Reynold Brown, is published. .
- The Dutch comics magazine Sjors is banned on Nazi orders. It will reappear after the war in June 1947.
- The final issue of Blue Ribbon Comics is published.
- The final issue of Human Top is published.
- Action Comics (1938 series) #46 - DC Comics
- Adventure Comics (1938 series) #72 - DC Comics
- All-American Comics (1939 series) #36 - DC Comics
- Batman (1940 series) #9 - DC Comics
- Bulletman (1941 series) #4 - Fawcett Comics
- Captain Aero Comics (1941 series) #3 - Holyoke Publishing
- Captain America Comics (1941 series) #12 - Timely Comics
- Captain Marvel Adventures (1941 series) #8 - Fawcett Comics
- Cat-Man Comics (1941 series) #8 - Holyoke Publishing
- Crack Comics (1940 series) #22 - Quality Comics
- Detective Comics (1937 series) #61 - DC Comics
- Flash Comics (1940 series) #27 - DC Comics
- Marvel Mystery Comics (1939 series) #29 - Timely Comics
- Master Comics (1940 series) #24 - Fawcett Comics
- More Fun Comics (1936 series) #77 - DC Comics
- Mystic Comics (1940 series) #8 - Timely Comics
- Sensation Comics (1942 series) #3 - DC Comics
- Star Spangled Comics (1941 series) #6 - DC Comics
- Superman (1939 series) #15 - DC Comics
- Target Comics (1942 series) #1 - Novelty Press
- V...- Comics (1942 series) #2 - Fox Feature Syndicate, Final Issue
- Whiz Comics (1940 series) #28 - Fawcett Comics

=== Spring Issue ===
- 4Most Comics (1942 series) #2 - Novelty Press
- All Flash Quarterly (1941 series) #4 - DC Comics
- All-Winners Comics (1941 series) #4 - Timely Comics
- America's Greatest Comics (1941 series) #2 - Fawcett Comics
- Green Lantern Quarterly (1941 series) #3 - DC Comics
- Human Torch Comics (1940 series) #7 - Timely Comics
- Leading Comics (1941 series) #2 - DC Comics
- Minute-Man (1941 series) #3 - Fawcett Comics: Final issue
- Sub-Mariner Comics (1941 series) #5 - Timely Comics
- World's Finest Comics (1941 series) #5 - DC Comics
- Wow Comics (1940 series) #5 - Fawcett Comics
- Young Allies Comics (1941 series) #3 - Timely Comics

=== April ===
- April 16: Marten Toonder's Tom Poes story Het Monster-Ei marks the debut of Wammes Waggel.
- April 20: The first episode of Crockett Johnson's Barnaby is published.
- Action Comics (1938 series) #47 - DC Comics
- Adventure Comics (1938 series) #73 - DC Comics
- All-American Comics (1939 series) #37 - DC Comics
- All-Star Comics (1940 series) #10 - DC Comics
- Batman (1940 series) #10 - DC Comics
- Captain Aero Comics (1941 series) #4 - Holyoke Publishing
- Captain America Comics (1941 series) #13 - Timely Comics
- Captain Marvel Adventures (1941 series) #9 - Fawcett Comics
- Cat-Man Comics (1941 series) #9 - Holyoke Publishing
- Comedy Comics (1942 series) #9 - Timely Comics
- Detective Comics (1937 series) #62 - DC Comics
- Flash Comics (1940 series) #28 - DC Comics
- Joker Comics (1942 series) #1 - Timely Comics. In its first issue Basil Wolverton's Powerhouse Pepper makes its debut.
- Marvel Mystery Comics (1939 series) #30 - Timely Comics
- Master Comics (1940 series) #25 - Fawcett Comics
- More Fun Comics (1936 series) #78 - DC Comics
- Red Ryder Comics, with issue #6, taken over from Hawley by Dell Comics.
- Sensation Comics (1942 series) #4 — DC Comics
- Spy Smasher (1941 series) #4 - Fawcett Comics
- Star Spangled Comics (1941 series) #7 - DC Comics
- Target Comics (1942 series) #2 - Novelty Press
- Whiz Comics (1940 series) #29 - Fawcett Comics

=== May ===
- May 15: In the U.S. internment camp for Japanese-Americans, Santa Anita, California at the Assembly Center, Chris Ishii creates the comic strip Li'l Neebo for the prisoners. The series is later continued by, respectively, Tom Okamoto and Jack Ito until 1944.
- May 16: The British comics magazine Funny Wonder merges with another magazine Wonder.
- The final episode of Tailspin Tommy, originally created by Hal Forrest, is published.
- Action Comics (1938 series) #48 - DC Comics
- Adventure Comics (1938 series) #74 - DC Comics
- All-American Comics (1939 series) #38 - DC Comics
- Bulletman (1941 series) #5 - Fawcett Comics
- Captain Aero Comics (1941 series) #5 - Holyoke Publishing
- Captain America Comics (1941 series) #14 - Timely Comics
- Captain Marvel Adventures (1941 series) #10 - Fawcett Comics
- Captain Marvel Adventures (1941 series) #11 - Fawcett Comics
- Cat-Man Comics (1941 series) #10 - Holyoke Publishing
- Crack Comics (1940 series) #23 - Quality Comics
- Detective Comics (1937 series) #63 - DC Comics
- Flash Comics (1940 series) #29 - DC Comics
- Marvel Mystery Comics (1939 series) #31 - Timely Comics
- Master Comics (1940 series) #26 - Fawcett Comics
- More Fun Comics (1936 series) #79 - DC Comics
- Mystic Comics (1940 series) #9 - Timely Comics
- Sensation Comics (1942 series) #5 - DC Comics: In this issue the supervillain Paula von Gunther makes her debut.
- Star Spangled Comics (1941 series) #8 - DC Comics
- Superman (1939 series) #16 - DC Comics
- Target Comics (1942 series) #3 - Novelty Press
- U.S.A. Comics (1941 series) #4 - Timely Comics
- Whiz Comics (1940 series) #30 - Fawcett Comics

=== June ===
- June 11: Hergé's Tintin story The Secret of the Unicorn is prepublished in Le Soir. Halfway the story butler Nestor and the castle of Marlinspike Hall make their debut.
- June 13: The final episode of comic strip The Shadow by Walter B. Gibson and Vernon Greene is published.
- Action Comics (1938 series) #49 - DC Comics
- Adventure Comics (1938 series) #75 - DC Comics
- All-American Comics (1939 series) #39 - DC Comics
- All Star Comics (1940 series) #11 - DC Comics
- Batman (1940 series) #11 - DC Comics
- Blue Beetle (1939 series) #12 - Holyoke Publishing
- Captain Aero Comics (1941 series) #6 - Holyoke Publishing
- Captain America Comics (1941 series) #15 - Timely Comics
- Captain Marvel Adventures (1941 series) #12 - Fawcett Comics
- Cat-Man Comics (1941 series) #11 - Holyoke Publishing
- Comedy Comics (1942 series) #10 - Timely Comics
- Detective Comics (1937 series) #64 - DC Comics
- Flash Comics (1940 series) #30 - DC Comics
- Joker Comics (1942 series) #2 - Timely Comics
- Marvel Mystery Comics (1939 series) #32 - Timely Comics
- Master Comics (1940 series) #27 - Fawcett Comics
- More Fun Comics (1936 series) #80 - DC Comics
- Sensation Comics (1942 series) #6 - DC Comics
- Spy Smasher (1941 series) #5 - Fawcett Comics
- Star Spangled Comics (1941 series) #9 - DC Comics
- Target Comics (1942 series) #4 - Novelty Press
- Yank, the Army Weekly #1 - Harvey Comics: In its first issue George Baker's Sad Sack makes its debut.
- Whiz Comics (1940 series) #31 - Fawcett Comics

=== Summer Issue ===
- All Flash Quarterly (1941 series) #5 - DC Comics. In this issue the villain trio Winky, Blinky, and Noddy make their debut.
- All-Winners Comics (1941 series) #5 - Timely Comics
- America's Greatest Comics (1941 series) #3 - Fawcett Comics
- Green Lantern Quarterly (1941 series) #4 - DC Comics
- Human Torch Comics (1940 series) #8 - Timely Comics
- Leading Comics (1941 series) #3 - DC Comics
- Sub-Mariner Comics (1941 series) #6 - Timely Comics
- Wonder Woman (1942 series) #1 - DC Comics, which marks the first stand-alone series of William Moulton Marston and Harry G. Peter's Wonder Woman. In its first issue supervillain Ares makes his debut.
- World's Finest Comics (1941 series) #6 - DC Comics
- U.S.A. Comics (1941 series) #5 - Timely Comics
- Young Allies Comics (1941 series) #4 - Timely Comics

=== July ===
- The American comics magazine The Funnies changes its name to New Funnies.
- Action Comics (1938 series) #50 - DC Comics
- Adventure Comics (1938 series) #76 - DC Comics
- All-American Comics (1939 series) #40 - DC Comics
- Bulletman (1941 series) #6 - Fawcett Comics
- Captain Aero Comics (1941 series) #7 - Holyoke Publishing
- Captain America Comics (1941 series) #16 - Timely Comics
- Captain Marvel Adventures (1941 series) #13 - Fawcett Comics
- Cat-Man Comics (1941 series) #12 - Holyoke Publishing
- Crack Comics (1940 series) #24 - Quality Comics
- Crime Does Not Pay debuts with issue #22, continuing the numbering of Silver Streak Comics — Lev Gleason Publications
- Detective Comics (1937 series) #65 - DC Comics
- Flash Comics (1940 series) #31 - DC Comics
- Gene Autry Comics (1941 series) #2 - Fawcett Comics
- Krazy Komics (1942 series) #1 - Timely Comics
- Marvel Mystery Comics (1939 series) #33 - Timely Comics
- Master Comics (1940 series) #28 - Fawcett Comics
- More Fun Comics (1936 series) #81 - DC Comics
- Sensation Comics (1942 series) #7 - DC Comics
- Star Spangled Comics (1941 series) #10 - DC Comics
- Superman (1939 series) #17 - DC Comics
- Target Comics (1942 series) #5 - Novelty Press
- Whiz Comics (1940 series) #32 - Fawcett Comics

=== August ===
- In Al Capp's Li'l Abner the comic-within-a-comic Fearless Fosdick makes its debut, though only as a reference. For his first adventure within the series itself readers have to wait until 19 June 1944.
- Action Comics (1938 series) #51 - DC Comics
- Adventure Comics (1938 series) #77 - DC Comics: In this issue Alfred Bester and Stan Kaye's Genius Jones makes its debut.
- All-American Comics (1939 series) #41 - DC Comics
- All Star Comics (1940 series) #12 - DC Comics
- Batman (1940 series) #12 - DC Comics
- Blue Beetle (1939 series) #13 - Holyoke Publishing
- Captain America Comics (1941 series) #17 - Timely Comics
- Captain Marvel Adventures (1941 series) #14 - Fawcett Comics
- Detective Comics (1937 series) #66 - DC Comics: In this issue the Batman villain Harvey Dent, better known as Two-Face, makes his debut.
- Flash Comics (1940 series) #32 - DC Comics
- Marvel Mystery Comics (1939 series) #34 - Timely Comics
- Master Comics (1940 series) #29 - Fawcett Comics
- More Fun Comics (1936 series) #82 - DC Comics
- Mystic Comics (1940 series) #10 - Timely Comics
- Sensation Comics (1942 series) #8 - DC Comics
- Spy Smasher (1941 series) #6 - Fawcett Comics
- Star Spangled Comics (1941 series) #11 - DC Comics
- Target Comics (1942 series) #6 - Novelty Press
- Whiz Comics (1940 series) #33 - Fawcett Comics

=== September ===
- September 4: In Chester Gould's Dick Tracy the villain Pruneface makes his debut.
- Action Comics (1938 series) #52 - DC Comics
- Adventure Comics (1938 series) #78 - DC Comics
- All-American Comics (1939 series) #42 - DC Comics
- Blue Beetle (1939 series) #14 - Holyoke Publishing
- Bulletman (1941 series) #7 - Fawcett Comics
- Captain Aero Comics (1941 series) #8 - Holyoke Publishing
- Captain America Comics (1941 series) #18 - Timely Comics
- Captain Marvel Adventures (1941 series) #15 - Fawcett Comics
- Cat-Man Comics (1941 series) #13 - Holyoke Publishing
- Comedy Comics (1942 series) #11 - Timely Comics
- Crack Comics (1940 series) #25 - Quality Comics
- Detective Comics (1937 series) #67 - DC Comics
- Flash Comics (1940 series) #33 - DC Comics
- Joker Comics (1942 series) #3 - Timely Comics
- Krazy Komics (1942 series) #2 - Timely Comics
- Marvel Mystery Comics (1939 series) #35 - Timely Comics
- Master Comics (1940 series) #30 - Fawcett Comics
- More Fun Comics (1936 series) #83 - DC Comics
- Sensation Comics (1942 series) #9 - DC Comics
- Star Spangled Comics (1941 series) #12 - DC Comics
- Superman (1939 series) #18 - DC Comics
- Target Comics (1942 series) #7 - Novelty Press
- Whiz Comics (1940 series) #34 - Fawcett Comics

=== Fall Issue ===
- All Flash (1941 series) #6, previously All Flash Quarterly - DC Comics
- All-Winners Comics (1941 series) #6 - Timely Comics
- America's Greatest Comics (1941 series) #4 - Fawcett Comics
- Green Lantern Quarterly (1941 series) #5 - DC Comics
- Human Torch Comics (1940 series) #9 - Timely Comics
- Leading Comics (1941 series) #4 - DC Comics
- Sub-Mariner Comics (1941 series) #7 - Timely Comics
- Wonder Woman (1942 series) #2 - DC Comics
- World's Finest Comics (1941 series) #7 - DC Comics
- U.S.A. Comics (1941 series) #6 - Timely Comics
- Young Allies Comics (1941 series) #5 - Timely Comics

=== October ===
- October 1: Bob Karp, Carl Barks and Jack Hannah create the first American adventure comics series based on Donald Duck. The series kicks off with the story Donald Duck Finds Pirate Gold.
- October 11; Josè Carioca debuts in comics, in a Sunday table by Hubie Karp and Bob Grant.
- In Belgium the Nazis ban the comics magazine Bimbo.
- Action Comics (1938 series) #53 - DC Comics
- Adventure Comics (1938 series) #79 - DC Comics
- All-American Comics (1939 series) #43 - DC Comics
- All Star Comics (1940 series) #13 - DC Comics
- Batman (1940 series) #13 - DC Comics
- Blue Beetle (1939 series) #15 - Holyoke Publishing
- Bulletman (1941 series) #8 - Fawcett Comics
- Captain America Comics (1941 series) #19 - Timely Comics
- Captain Marvel Adventures (1941 series) #16 - Fawcett Comics
- Cat-Man Comics (1941 series) #14 - Holyoke Publishing
- Detective Comics (1937 series) #68 - DC Comics
- Flash Comics (1940 series) #34 - DC Comics
- Marvel Mystery Comics (1939 series) #36 - Timely Comics
- Master Comics (1940 series) #31 - Fawcett Comics
- More Fun Comics (1936 series) #84 - DC Comics
- Sensation Comics (1942 series) #10 - DC Comics
- Star Spangled Comics (1941 series) #13 - DC Comics
- Target Comics (1942 series) #8 - Novelty Press
- Whiz Comics (1940 series) #35 - Fawcett Comics

=== November ===
- Action Comics (1938 series) #54 - DC Comics
- Adventure Comics (1938 series) #80 - DC Comics
- Air Fighter Comics (1941 series) #2 - Hillman Periodicals
- All-American Comics (1939 series) #44 - DC Comics
- All-Flash (1941 series) #07, previously quarterly - DC Comics
- Blue Beetle (1939 series) #16 - Holyoke Publishing
- Captain Aero Comics (1941 series) #9 - Holyoke Publishing
- Captain America Comics (1941 series) #20 - Timely Comics
- Captain Marvel Adventures (1941 series) #17 - Fawcett Comics
- Cat-Man Comics (1941 series) #15 - Holyoke Publishing
- Crack Comics (1940 series) #26 - Quality Comics
- Detective Comics (1937 series) #69 - DC Comics
- Flash Comics (1940 series) #35 - DC Comics
- Gene Autry Comics (1941 series) #3 - Fawcett Comics
- Joker Comics (1942 series) #4 - Timely Comics
- Krazy Komics (1942 series) #3 - Timely Comics
- Marvel Mystery Comics (1939 series) #37 - Timely Comics
- Master Comics (1940 series) #32 - Fawcett Comics
- More Fun Comics (1936 series) #85 - DC Comics
- Sensation Comics (1942 series) #11 - DC Comics
- Star Spangled Comics (1941 series) #14 - DC Comics
- Superman (1939 series) #19 - DC Comics
- Target Comics (1942 series) #9 - Novelty Press
- Whiz Comics (1940 series) #36 - Fawcett Comics

=== December ===
- The Swedish comic strip Allan Kämpe by Eugen Semitjov makes its debut.
- Action Comics (1938 series) #55 - DC Comics
- Adventure Comics (1938 series) #81 - DC Comics
- Air Fighters Comics (1941 series) #3 - Hillman Periodicals: In this issue Heap makes his debut.
- All-American Comics (1939 series) #45 - DC Comics
- All Star Comics (1940 series) #14 - DC Comics
- Batman (1940 series) #14 - DC Comics
- Captain America Comics (1941 series) #21 - Timely Comics
- Cat-Man Comics (1941 series) #16 - Holyoke Publishing
- Comedy Comics (1942 series) #12 - Timely Comics
- Detective Comics (1937 series) #70 - DC Comics
- Flash Comics (1940 series) #36 - DC Comics
- Joker Comics (1942 series) #5 - Timely Comics
- Krazy Komics (1942 series) #4 - Timely Comics
- Marvel Mystery Comics (1939 series) #38 - Timely Comics
- More Fun Comics (1936 series) #86 - DC Comics
- Sensation Comics (1942 series) #12 - DC Comics
- Star Spangled Comics (1941 series) #15 - DC Comics
- Target Comics (1942 series) #10 - Novelty Press
- U.S.A. Comics (1941 series) #6 - Timely Comics

=== Winter Issue ===
- All-Winners Comics (1941 series) #7 - Timely Comics
- Boy Commandos (1942 series) #1 - DC Comics
- Comic Cavalcade (1942 series) #1 - DC Comics
- Green Lantern Quarterly (1941 series) #6 - DC Comics
- Human Torch Comics (1940 series) #10 - Timely Comics
- Leading Comics (1941 series) #5 - DC Comics
- Sub-Mariner Comics (1941 series) #8 - Timely Comics
- World's Finest Comics (1941 series) #8 - DC Comics
- Eugen Semitjov begins publishing Allan Kämpe

=== Specific date unknown ===
- The final issue of the Flemish comics magazine Wonderland is published, a supplement to the newspaper De Dag.
- The first episode of Carl Grubert's The Berrys is published. It will run until 1974.
- Bovil creates his comic strip Tusen Och en Natt, based on Arabian Nights. It will run until his death in 1949.
- Vic Herman creates Winnie the Wac.
- Philip Mendoza draws The Early Life of Winston Churchill, which is the earliest biographical comic about Winston Churchill.
- During the internment of Japanese Americans Bennie Nobori draws the comic strip Yankee Reporter for the prisoners in camp Topaz in Central Utah.
- Joe Simon and Jack Kirby leave Timely Comics and move to National Comics (now DC Comics).
- Ángel Umpierrez launches his gag comic Don Cristóbal.
- Golden Arrow (1942 series) #1 - Fawcett Comics

== Births ==
=== February ===
- February 6: Clive Collins, British cartoonist, (d. 2022).

== Deaths ==
=== April ===
- April 1:
  - John Devlin, American comics artist (assistant of Rube Goldberg, continued Looy Dot Dope) and editor (Quality Comics), dies at age 36.
  - Charles H. Wellington, American comics artist (Pa's (Imported) Son-In-Law), dies at age 48.

=== May ===
- May 12: George William Wakefield, British comics artist (worked for Film Fun, made comics based on Laurel & Hardy), dies from a stroke at age 54.
- May 14: René Bull, Irish comics illustrator and comics artist, dies at age 79.

=== June ===
- June 21: Victor T'Sas, A.K.A. Vias, Belgian painter, advertising illustrator and illustrator (made various picture stories and text comics for Le Globe Illustré, Le Patriote Illustré, Pourquoi Pas? and publishing company Brepols), dies at age 75.

=== July ===
- July 11: Antonio Salemme, Italian comics artist (Il Principe Azzurro), dies at age 48 or 49.
- July 21: Giove Toppi, Italian comics artist (Topo Lino, Renato Gallo), dies at age 53.

=== August ===
- August 10: Albert Guillaume, French caricaturist, illustrator and poster designer who also made some occasional pantomime comics, dies at age 69.

=== September ===
- September 11: Horst Rosenthal, German-born French comics artist (made a series of text comics while incarcerated in Gurs internment camp, among them a comic strip starring Mickey Mouse named Mickey au Camp de Gurs), is executed in Auschwitz at the age of 27.

=== November ===
- November 7: J. Norman Lynd, American comics artist (Family Portraits, continued Vignettes of Life), dies at age 63.
- November 11: Billy DeBeck, American comics artist (Barney Google), dies at the age of 52.
- November 26: Larry Whittington, American comics artist (Fritzi Ritz) dies in a car accident at the age of 39.

=== Specific date unknown ===
- Emil Reinicke, German comics artist (published in Fliegende Blätter), dies at age 82 or 83.
- Josiah Walker, aka Jos Walker, British comics artist (Sexton Blake), dies at age 55.

== First issues by title ==
- Boy Commandos, cover-dated Winter, published by DC Comics.
- Comic Cavalcade, cover-dated Winter, published by DC Comics
- Hangman Comics, cover-dated Spring, published by MLJ Magazines Inc.
- Sensation Comics, cover-dated January, published by DC Comics.
- V...- Comics, cover-dated January, published by Fox Feature Syndicate
- Wonder Woman, cover-dated Summer, published by DC Comics.

== Initial appearances by character name ==
- Airboy in Air Fighters Comics #2 (November), created by writers Charles Biro and Dick Wood, and artist Al Camy - Hillman Periodicals
- Air Wave in Detective Comics #60 (February), created by Murray Boltinoff - DC Comics
- Boomerang in More Fun Comics #79 (May) - DC Comics
- Dan the Dyna-Mite in Star Spangled Comics #7 (April), created by Mort Weisinger and Hal Sharp - DC Comics
- Dan Turpin in Detective Comics #64 (June), created by Joe Simon and Jack Kirby - DC Comics
- Doctor Poison in Sensation Comics #2 (February), created by William Moulton Marston and Harry G. Peter - DC Comics
- Etta Candy' in Sensation Comics #2 (February), created by William Moulton Marston and Harry G. Peter - DC Comics
- False-Face in Leading Comics #2 (National Comics, Spring), created by Mort Weisinger and Creig Flessel
- Gay Ghost in Sensation Comics #1 (January), created by Gardner Fox and Howard Purcell - DC Comics
- Guardian in Star Spangled Comics #7 (April), created by Joe Simon and Jack Kirby - DC Comics
- Heap in Air Fighters Comics #3 (December), created by Harry Stein and Mort Leav - Hillman Periodicals
- Kid Eternity in Hit Comics #25 (December), created by Otto Binder and Sheldon Moldoff - DC Comics
- Liberty Belle in Boy Commandos #1 (December), created by Don Cameron and Chuck Winter - DC Comics
- Mary Marvel in Captain Marvel Adventures #18 (December), created by Otto Binder and Marc Swayze - DC Comics
- Metallo in World's Finest Comics #6 (June), created by Robert Bernstein and Al Plastino - DC Comics
- Mister Terrific (Terry Sloane) in Sensation Comics #1 (DC Comics, January), created by Charles Reizenstein and Hal Sharpe
- Paul Kirk, created by Jack Kirby, in Adventure Comics #58 (January), published by DC Comics
- The Prankster in Action Comics #51 (August), created by Jerry Siegel and John Sikela - DC Comics
- The Puzzler in Action Comics #49 (June), created by Jerry Siegel and John Sikela - DC Comics
- Shade in Flash Comics #33 (September), created by Gardner Fox - DC Comics
- Rag Doll in Flash Comics #36 (December), created by Gardner Fox - DC Comics
- Robotman in Star Spangled Comics #7 (April), created by Jerry Siegel and Leo Nowak - DC Comics
- Sal Maroni in Detective Comics #66 (August), created by Bill Finger and Bob Kane - DC Comics
- Spider Widow in Feature Comics #57 (June), created by Frank Borth - DC Comics
- TNT in Star Spangled Comics #7 (April), created by Mort Weisinger and Hal Sharp - DC Comics
- Two Face in Detective Comics #66 (August), created by Bill Finger and Bob Kane - DC Comics
- Wildcat in Sensation Comics #1 (January), created by Bill Finger and Irwin Hasen - DC Comics
- Wonder Woman, created by William Moulton Marston, in All Star Comics#8 (January), published by All-American Publications
