= Captain Nazi =

Fictional villain

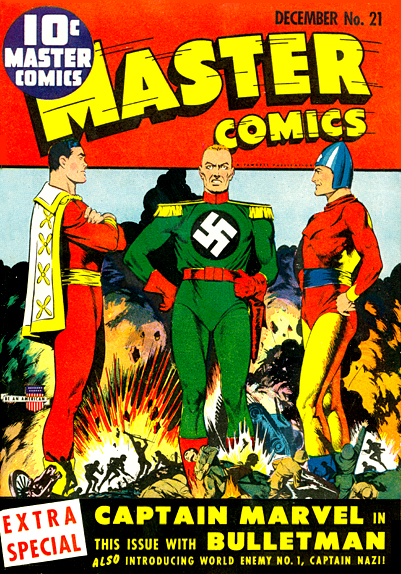
- Captain Nazi, Captain Marvel, and Bulletman as depicted in Master Comics #21 (1941), art by Mac Raboy.

Publication information
- Publisher: Fawcett Comics (1941–1944); DC Comics (1978–present)
- First appearance: Master Comics #21 (December 1941)
- Created by: William Woolfolk (writer); Mac Raboy (artist)

In-story information
- Alter ego: Baron Albrecht Krieger
- Species: Enhanced Human
- Team affiliations: Monster Society of Evil; Nazi Party; Fourth Reich; Secret Society of Super Villains
- Notable aliases: Colonel Nazi
- Abilities: Superhuman strength, speed and stamina; Enhanced senses; Invulnerability; Flight; Hand-to-Hand Combat; Armed Combat

Captain Nazi (Baron Albrecht Krieger) is a fictional character appearing in American comic books published by Fawcett Comics and DC Comics. He is depicted as a super soldier created in an Axis powers experiment by his scientist father and is a recurring enemy of Captain Marvel and Captain Marvel Jr.. Captain Nazi has also been a recurring member of Mister Mind's Monster Society of Evil.

Captain Nazi made his first live-action appearance in a 2016 second season episode of The CW TV series DC's Legends of Tomorrow, played by André Eriksen.

== Publication history ==
Captain Nazi first appeared in Master Comics #21 (December 1941) and was created by William Woolfolk and Mac Raboy.

== Fictional character biography ==
=== Fawcett Comics ===
The super-strong Captain Nazi was genetically altered into a super soldier by his scientist father Siegmund Krieger, and developed into the "perfect specimen" to fight for Adolf Hitler and the Axis powers during World War II. He is given superhuman strength and stamina, and a special gas that allows him to fly. He is sent to battle American superheroes by the Nazis after his power is demonstrated to them by Hitler, and some of the heroes are shown. Nazi first appeared in Master Comics #21 (December 1941), in opposition to both Captain Marvel and Bulletman. During the second half of his battle with Captain Marvel, Captain Nazi attacks two innocent bystanders who happened to be fishing near the scene of the battle, after they pull him out of the lake, and he escapes in their boat. One of them, an old man named Jacob Freeman, is killed. Jacob's teenage grandson Freddy Freeman is saved by Captain Marvel, although he is crippled and his back broken. Due to Captain Marvel bestowing part of his power to him, Freddy becomes Captain Marvel Jr. He is then sent to defeat Captain Nazi by Captain Marvel.

Captain Marvel Jr. continues to hold a vendetta against Nazi, and the two frequently battle one another. Nazi also serves as a member of Mister Mind's Monster Society of Evil, one of the most powerful organisations of villains in the world which included Adolf Hitler, and assists their first plan to steal magic fortune-telling pearls from a princess, leading Captain Marvel to their hideout, and revealing their existence, during the World War II years. Captain Nazi made his final Fawcett Comics appearance in the story "General Nippon's Elusive Earthplane", published in Captain Marvel, Jr. #19 in 1944.

=== DC Comics ===
Captain Nazi appeared only sporadically in DC Comics' 1970s/1980s revival of the Marvel Family characters under the title Shazam!, save for reprints of his early appearances. Nazi's first appearance in a new DC Comics story was in Shazam! #34 (March- April 1978).

Following writer Roy Thomas and artist Tom Mandrake's new interpretation of the Captain Marvel mythos in the 1987 four-issue miniseries Shazam!: The New Beginning, Captain Nazi was re-introduced in a 1988 four-part story in Action Comics Weekly issues #623-626. Captain Nazi himself, however, only appeared in #624-626. The story was written by Thomas and his wife Dann Thomas, with art by Rick Stasi and Rick Magyar. The new Captain Nazi is a young Neo-Nazi named Lester Abernathy. Abernathy is given his "Captain Nazi" powers, costume and codename by a Neo-Nazi organization called the Sons of Valhalla and battles Captain Marvel. This version of the character made no further appearances and was subsequently retconned out of existence by the 1994 The Power of Shazam! graphic novel, which again altered Captain Marvel's background and continuity.

Captain Nazi was introduced into the modern DC Universe in Jerry Ordway's The Power of Shazam! series in 1995. In the modern series, Nazi had been active during the 1940s, battling World War II-era heroes such as Bulletman, Minute-Man, and Spy Smasher, but placed himself in suspended animation in a chamber so that he could emerge in modern society and revive the Third Reich. Nazi's brother, scientist Wolf Krieger, and his granddaughter, a super-powered villainess named Madame Libertine who possesses mind-controlling powers, carry on Nazi's legacy in the 1990s and ultimately retrieve him from suspended animation. Issues #6–8 of The Power of Shazam series retell the story of Captain Nazi murdering Freddy Freeman's grandfather by throwing him a great distance with his superhuman strength, his crippling of Freddy, and Freddy's emergence as Marvel Jr. and attempted revenge on Nazi. He ultimately takes Nazi to Europe to be tried for war crimes.

Captain Nazi joins Lex Luthor's new Secret Society of Super Villains in the miniseries Villains United. He is blinded during the escape of the Secret Six when Catman plunges syringes into his eyes. Captain Nazi, now sporting cybernetic eyes, is later hired by Black Mask to kill Red Hood, but is apparently killed by Red Hood. In Villains United Special #1 however, Nazi has survived. At the behest of the Society, Nazi arrives in Kahndaq to release prisoners there and fights Black Adam to a stalemate.

He has since appeared as leader of a Nazi-themed team in Justice Society of America named "The Fourth Reich" after the "One Year Later" jump, and is an opponent of Wonder Woman in "The Circle".

In The New 52 continuity reboot, Captain Nazi was genetically engineered to serve in Adolf Hitler's aerospace program. Vandal Savage successfully convinces the Third Reich to build a rocket that Captain Nazi will use to pilot himself and Savage into outer space to collect a larger sample of the meteor that gave Savage his powers. When the ship faces turbulence, Captain Nazi opts to land instead of going forward with the mission. After a crash landing, Savage beats Captain Nazi, though he survives.

== Powers and abilities ==
The experiment that gave Captain Nazi his powers had given him super-strength, super-speed, enhanced stamina, invulnerability, enhanced senses, and flight.

The post-Crisis version of Captain Nazi is an expert at hand-to-hand combat. He claims to have been trained by Adolf Hitler.

The New 52 version of Captain Nazi possesses aviation control skills and military protocol skills.

=== Equipment ===
Captain Nazi wields a modified Luger pistol.

== Other versions ==
An alternate universe version of Captain Nazi who became a member of H.I.V.E. appears in Flashpoint.

== In other media ==
- Albrecht Krieger makes a non-speaking appearance in a flashback depicted in the Justice League Unlimited episode "Patriot Act". He volunteers to be injected with an unstable super-soldier serum as part of "Project Captain Nazi", but the operation is thwarted by Spy Smasher.
- Albrecht Krieger appears in the Legends of Tomorrow episode "The Justice Society of America", portrayed by André Eriksen. This version is an ally of Eobard Thawne who uses a bio-molecular enhancer that the latter created to transform into a monstrous, self-proclaimed "Übermensch".
