= Lieutenant Marvels =

Comic superhero team

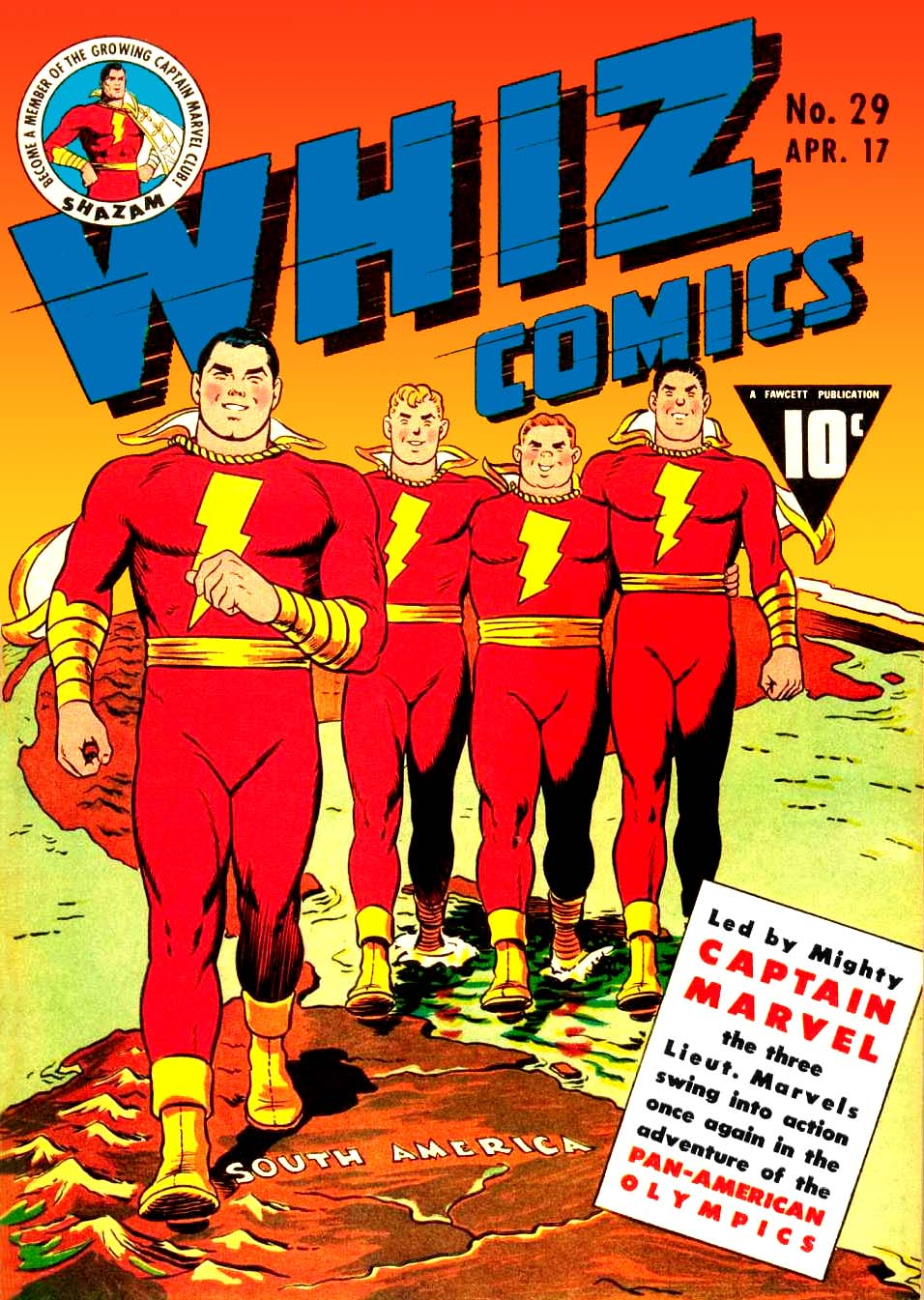
- Captain Marvel and his three Lieutenant Marvels (left to right: Lt. Hill Marvel, Lt. Fat Marvel, and Lt. Tall Marvel) on the cover of Whiz Comics #29 (April 1942) by C. C. Beck.

Publication information
- Publisher: Fawcett Comics (1941–1953); DC Comics (1972–1985)
- First appearance: Whiz Comics #21 (September 1941)
- Created by: C. C. Beck

In-story information
- Base(s): Fawcett City; Rock of Eternity
- Member(s): Lt. Tall Marvel ("Tall" Billy Batson); Lt. Fat Marvel ("Fat" Billy Batson); Lt. Hill Marvel ("Hill" Billy Batson); Captain Marvel (Billy Batson)

The Lieutenant Marvels are a team of superheroes appearing in American comic books originally published Fawcett Comics, and now DC Comics. They first appeared in Whiz Comics #21 in 1941. The physical appearance of the three characters was based on three real-life members of the Fawcett Comics staff: Paul Peck (Tall Billy), Ed Hamilton (Hill Billy), and Frank Taggart (Fat Billy).

== Publication history ==
The Lieutenants appeared periodically in the adventures of Captain Marvel and the Marvel Family through the early 1950s, and also when the characters were revived by DC Comics in the 1970s under the title Shazam!, although rarely. They were retconned out of existence during the Crisis on Infinite Earths in 1985. Some people, such as Jonathan Woodward in his Annotated Crisis on Infinite Earths website, suggest that the Lieutenant Marvels died in the last battle of the Crisis on Infinite Earths, although Who's Who in the DC Universe claims they survived but lost their powers.

The characters were reintroduced in Trials of Shazam! #2 (2006), only to lose their powers in the same issue. They also appeared as inhabitants of Earth-5 in Grant Morrison's The Multiversity miniseries in 2015.

== Fictional team history ==
Brooklyn, New York City, has its own Billy Batson, and he travels to the W.H.I.Z. radio station with two other Billy Batsons, one from the Western United States and one from the Southern United States, to visit the "real" Billy. To prevent confusion, the western Billy suggests he be called "Tall" Billy, the southern Billy is renamed "Hill" Billy and Brooklyn's Billy is given the title "Fat" Billy. At the "real" Billy's suggestion, all four Billys form the Billy Batson Club. Billy reveals he is Captain Marvel to them, and says they should only say "Shazam!" when he gives them a wink.

The nefarious Dr. Sivana hatches a plan to kill the "real" Billy Batson and sends his three henchmen to find out where Billy lives. Sivana's goons mistakenly find the other Billy Batsons instead and capture them. The mysterious Captain Death captures Tall Billy, Nazi Agent Herr Geyer captures Fat Billy, and bandit "Biggy" Brix captures Hill Billy. Sivana uses them as bait to trap the real Billy after hearing he is their friend, having Brix deliver a note, and demanding he comes to the Mill as Billy. When this happens he is knocked out and captured.

Sivana and his henchmen gag Billy and tie him and the other Billys to a log heading towards a buzzsaw, then leave. Billy is able to remove his gag on the buzzsaw, but his shout of "Shazam" can not be heard over the roar of the buzzsaw. With seconds to spare, Billy enlists the aid of his club members and they all shout "Shazam!" together.

When the smoke clears, Captain Marvel sees that the other Billys have transformed as well, into Tall Marvel, Hill Marvel, and Fat Marvel. Hill Marvel remarks that they have each changed into Captain Marvel but Fat Marvel counters that by saying that there is only one Captain Marvel. Tall Marvel suggests that they are really Lieutenant Marvels, hence the trio's name.

The Captain and his three Lieutenants easily defeat Sivana and his henchmen, knocking their plane down and apparently killing all the villains except Sivana. After shouting "Shazam!" and transforming back into their civilian identities, the three Billys head back home. The Lieutenants returned from time to time during the Fawcett Comics era to aid their hero. In Captain Marvel Adventures #4 they are again kidnapped by Sivana's henchmen. Captain Marvel follows the kidnappers to Sivana's base. The three Billys are tied up under three sharp pendulums. However Billy transforms with them and they defeat the henchmen. They hear a noise in a shed, and find Sivana's daughter Beautia bound and gagged inside. They release her and she reveals Sivana did this. They fly away before Sivana detonates tons of dynamite under the house, then defeat him. They were probably put in suspended animation until 1973, along with many Marvel characters, by the Sivanas. They make their first DC appearance in Shazam! #30, when the whole Marvel Family is called upon to destroy Sivana's steel menagerie, which is threatening to wreck Pittsburgh. Incongruously, the three are able to transform on their own, while in a later story, "Assault on the Rock of Eternity" in World's Finest Comics #267, Captain Marvel has to gather the three Billies together so they could simultaneously say the magic word in order to transform.

The Lieutenant Marvels exist, without powers though still helping the Marvel Family to fight crime, on Earth-5, as seen in The Multiversity miniseries by writer Grant Morrison.

== Powers and abilities ==
By shouting "Shazam!", the Four Billy Batsons are transformed into the Lieutenant Marvels. In this form, they each have the powers of Captain Marvel: the wisdom of Solomon, the strength of Hercules, the stamina of Atlas, the power of Zeus, the courage of Achilles, and the speed of Mercury. Since they have to share the power, they are each only one-third as powerful as Captain Marvel.

== In other media ==
=== Film ===
In the direct-to-video animated film Justice League: Crisis on Two Earths, three superpowered henchmen with powers similar to the Marvels are employed by Superwoman, a criminal, parallel universe incarnation of Wonder Woman, and referred to as her Lieutenants. However, instead of the "classic" Lieutenant Marvels, the trio appear as criminal counterparts of Captain Marvel, Captain Marvel Jr., and Uncle Marvel (listed in the film's credits as, respectively, "Captain Super", "Captain Super Jr.", and "Uncle Super").

=== Television ===
In the TV series Young Justice, Freddy Freeman and Mary Bromfield, under the names Lieutenant Marvel and Sergeant Marvel, joined the Team AND left the Team in between Seasons One and Two. Mary appears in the fourth season, having given up the Sgt. Marvel moniker.
