= Boy Commandos =

Fictional organization of young boys fighting Nazis in DC comics

- Boy Commandos #1 (Sep/Oct 1973), art by Jack Kirby and Joe Simon.

Publication information
- Publisher: DC Comics
- First appearance: Detective Comics #64 (June 1942)
- Created by: Joe Simon, Jack Kirby

In-story information
- Member(s): André Chavard, Alfie Twidgett, Jan Haasan, Brooklyn (later retconned as Dan Turpin)

Boy Commandos is a fictional organization from DC Comics first appearing in Detective Comics #64 (June 1942) by Joe Simon and Jack Kirby. They are a combination of "kid gang" characters, an international cast of young boys fighting Nazis — or in their own parlance, "the Ratzies".

== Creation ==
Simon and Kirby were hired away from Timely Comics by DC towards the end of 1941, primarily due to their success on Captain America, but without there being a clear purpose to the decision, nor title to work on. Finding themselves initially embroiled in the Captain Marvel lawsuit, Jack Liebowitz gave them free rein to create or revamp DC heroes. Initially, the duo created new versions of The Sandman, and Manhunter (both of whom bore strong resemblance to their Captain America work), before deciding that "kid gangs seemed to be the way to go". Teenage sidekicks (Batman's Robin, Captain America's Bucky, etc.) were fast becoming a comics staple, intended to provide young characters with whom youthful readers could identify. Simon and Kirby's own Sentinels of Liberty (later the Young Allies) had already succeeded in this mold, and had an influence on their subsequent creation.

Detective Comics #65 (July 1942), art by Jack Kirby, Jerry Robinson and Joe Simon.

Having already created the "Sentinels of Liberty" for Timely, they now created for DC the Newsboy Legion ("a Dead End Kids-style group led by a police officer in a Captain America-like blue-and-yellow costume, toting a shield"). Although America had not yet entered the war, headlines and news stories highlighted the role of British commandos, so Simon and Kirby fused the kid gang with the commando, and created The Boy Commandos.

The international group included the French André Chavard, the English Alfie Twidgett, the Dutch Jan Haasan and an American only known as "Brooklyn".

Debuting in the pages of Detective Comics #64 (the issue #65's cover (left) shows Batman presenting the gang but they appeared first in the issue before) cover-dated June 1942, the team became extremely popular, also appearing in World's Finest Comics (#8-41, 1942-1949) and were then soon spun off into their own title, launching with a 'Winter 1942' date. The title sold "over a million copies each month", and was one of DC's "three biggest hits" alongside Superman and Batman. Kirby drew around five pages a day of the title, but Liebowitz requested an even faster turn-around, fearing (as happened) that the two would be drafted, as had many other industry professionals. Simon and Kirby hired "inkers, [letterers], colorists, and writers, striving to create a year's worth of tales" (Boy Commandos was also a quarterly title until Winter 1945). Among those hired was a young Gil Kane, who recalls being:

"hired to do as many Boy Commandos, Newsboy Legion, and Sandman stories as I could... they gave me scripts and they would do the splashes and they would have it inked".

Boy Commandos #1 (December 1942). Their first featured anthology series; penciled by Jack Kirby, inked by Joe Simon.

According to Jess Nevins' Encyclopedia of Golden Age Superheroes, "most of their criminals are ordinary, either Germans and Japanese or merely human criminals, but there are also exotics like Crazy Quilt, Diamond Hand, and Mr. Bleak, he of the devilish shadow".

Boy Commandos ran until issue #36 (Nov/Dec 1949), and was edited throughout by Jack Schiff. Among the individuals who assisted Simon and Kirby on the title (and its covers) were future-Superman legend Curt Swan, as well as Steve Brodie, Louis Cazeneuve and Carmine Infantino.

== Fictional team biography ==
The eponymous characters were André Chavard from France; Alfie Twidgett from England, Jan Haasan from the Netherlands, and a member known only as "Brooklyn" from the United States. An elite commando squad of orphaned children, led by the adult Captain Rip Carter, they fought on all fronts of the Second World War.

In September 1944, the Newsboy Legion teamed up with the Boy Commandos to stop armed and armored traitors based out of New York City.

The team's adventures continued well past the war, even though there were many roster changes. Jan left first, having found relatives in his homeland to stay with. Alfie was replaced by a Texan named Tex. Percy Clearweather, a glasses-wearing genius, replaced André.

Years later, writers retconned Brooklyn as a young version of Superman supporting character (and fellow Kirby creation) Dan Turpin, that André Chavard had become the head of the French Intelligence Département Gamma, and that Alfie Twidgett was now the head of the firm Statistical Occurrences Ltd. (SOL), with his daughter Twiggie.

In addition, members of the team have seen print in a couple of titles since the late 1940s.

In the 1970s, during Kirby's involvement at DC, several of their stories were reprinted in various books, particularly those written and drawn by Kirby himself (e.g. Mister Miracle #6 in February 1972). A reprint Boy Commandos title was published in Sep/Oct 1973 under editor E. Nelson Bridwell, but lasted only two issues before disappearing.

The four original members, minus Brooklyn, reappeared late during the run of Len Wein's Blue Beetle, which reintroduced Alfie as the founder and president of Statistical Occurrences Ltd., an insurance company specializing in properties which may attract the activities of superhumans. Using his daughter "Twiggie" as a mediator, Alfie hires Murray Takamoto, an ex-S.T.A.R. Labs administrator (and college roommate of Ted Kord) who'd worked on a "Star Wars" satellite program, which S.O.L. had received a contract concerning its protection. Joining Alfie in this venture are his old teammates Andre, now head of the fictional Department Gamma of the French Secret Service, Jan, now a professor working for the Hague Centre for Strategic Studies, and their former mentor "Rip" Carter, now a general. It was implied that they would eventually come into conflict, along with the Blue Beetle, with corrupt European industrialist Klaus Cornelius, who had already used his influence to disband Europe's lead super-hero agency, the Global Guardians, and was working to resurrect the Boy Commandos' old enemy Agent Axis. However, the series ended before the storyline could reach fruition, and no further developments have been mentioned since then, although Cornelius did make a brief cameo during Kurt Busiek's Power Company miniseries.

They made an appearance in the most recent incarnation of The Brave and the Bold (issue #9, February 2008), in which they teamed up with fellow World War II heroes, the Blackhawks.

== Collection ==
DC published the first of 2 hardback collections of Simon and Kirby's work on the series:

- The Boy Commandos Vol. 1, 2010, ISBN (reprints Detective Comics #64-73, World's Finest Comics #8-9 and Boy Commandos #1-2).
- The Boy Commandos Vol. 2, 2015, ISBN (reprints Detective Comics #74-83, World's Finest Comics #10-13 and Boy Commandos #3-5).

== See also ==
- CHERUB
- Henderson's Boys
