= Osiris (DC Comics) =

- Amon Tomaz as Osiris. Art by Keith Giffen, Dan Jurgens, and Norm Rapmund.

Publication information
- Publisher: DC Comics
- First appearance: Cameo appearance: Teen Titans #38 (September 2006); Full appearance: 52 #23 (December 2006)
- Created by: Geoff Johns; Grant Morrison; Greg Rucka; Mark Waid; Keith Giffen; Drew Johnson

In-story information
- Alter ego: Amon Tomaz
- Species: Human
- Place of origin: Kahndaq (current); Cairo, Egypt (formerly)
- Team affiliations: Teen Titans; Titans, Villains for Hire; Black Marvel Family; Black Lantern Corps; White Lantern Corps; Sons of Adam
- Supporting character of: Black Adam; Captain Marvel / Shazam
- Notable aliases: Black Adam Jr. Heir of Black Adam
- Abilities: By speaking the name of his benefactor ("Black Adam"), he is bestowed the same powers derived of Egyptian mythological deities. These powers grant him various others such as: List: Superhuman physical attributes: strength, speed, durability, etc.; Enhanced intelligence and knowledge; Physical and magical invulnerability; Control over lightning, magic, and flight; Skilled combatant, musician, and knowledge in the supernatural.

Altered in-story information for adaptations to other media
- Alter ego: Behrad Tazari; Behrad Tomaz
- Team affiliations: Legends of Tomorrow

Osiris (Amon Tomaz) is a fictional character in American comic books published by DC Comics. First appearing in 52 #23, the character was created by Geoff Johns, Greg Rucka, and Grant Morrison. Throughout the publication of the character's history, he often serves as both an analogue to Captain Marvel Jr./Shazam Jr. in Black Adam's supporting cast while being depicted as a superhero, antihero, and villain.

A Cairo-born Egyptian teenager and younger brother of Adrianna Tomaz, Amon is captured and sold into slavery by Intergang and brutalized for resisting their brainwashing attempts, rendering him disabled. He is found by Black Adam and Isis (Adrianna), the former healing him by granting him a portion of his power to transform and is christened the name "Osiris" by the empowering Egyptian deities after the eponymous deity. As Black Adam's brother-in-law and protege, Osiris also becomes a royal prince of Kahndaq, champion, and a member of his Black Marvel Family. He befriends Sobek, a anthropomorphic crocodile, and becomes a member of the Teen Titans for a brief period until his reputation is defamed by Amanda Waller and her Suicide Squad, subsequently killed shortly after by Sobek, who tricks him and reveals himself as one of the Four Horsemen of Apokolips. Amon is resurrected shortly afterwards as a reluctant and powerhouse member of Deathstroke's Titans mercenary team. Following The New 52 reboot, he is depicted as a Kahndaqi teenager and freedom fighter with occult expertise in the Sons of Adam, a Kahndaqi revolutionary group. Following DC Rebirth, Osiris's original history and murder by Sobek were restored.

As one of DC Comics' significant Arab characters, the character was praised for being a supporting character of Black Adam that helped set the character up for more interesting storylines. Due to this, the decision to killing off the character had received criticism.

In the Arrowverse television series Legends of Tomorrow, a different iteration of the character named Behrad Tarazi was introduced and played by Shayan Sobhian. Additionally, Amon Tomaz made his live-action debut in the DC Extended Universe film Black Adam (2022), portrayed by Bodhi Sabongui. In Black Adam, the character is Adrianna's son rather than younger brother. Her brother was named Karim and was portrayed by Mohammed Amer.

== Creation ==
During the development of the 52 series, Osiris' character came into fruition later in the development process as the team behind the book sought to create a love interest for Black Adam (initially considering Power Girl and Hippolyta before settling on creating a new version of Isis) and later, a supporting cast for the character with Amon introduced as a brother-in-law. As Osiris's character came into focus during the series, Geoff Johns created Sobek to act as a unique companion to the character, opting to dis-include another Marvel Family parallel character or another young superhero character.

== Publication history ==
Osiris was first depicted in Teen Titans #38 (September 2006), making his full appearance in 52 #23 (December 2006), created by Geoff Johns, Grant Morrison, Greg Rucka, Mark Waid, Keith Giffen, and Drew Johnson. He appeared extensively in the 2006-2007 weekly series 52 as a supporting character within Black Adam's portion of the story. The character is eventually killed off in the forty-third issue of the series, with his sequences involving his death drawn by Giffen. Giffen was noted to dislike Osiris and originally drew a short joke comic with Sobek humorously contemplating eating him, unaware of the character's death scene.

In March 2010, Osiris would first briefly return briefly in the Blackest Night crossover event. As part of DC's January campaign of bringing back 'dead comic runs', the Black Lantern Osiris featured in the one-shot The Power of Shazam! revival. Two months later, the character would make a full revival within the eighth issue of the Blackest Night main series.

== Characterization ==
=== Fictional character biography ===
A native of Cairo, Amon is the younger brother of Adrianna Tomaz with dreams of becoming a musician until his parents are killed by Intergang and both siblings are captured and sold into slavery. Showing unusual willpower and after several escapes, he is brutalized and made a paraplegic on Whisper A'Daire's orders. He is founded by Question and Renee Montoya, who alert Black Adam and Isis (Adrianna). Adam shares his power to save him and the Egyptian deities christen him "Osiris" and the trio become the Black Marvel Family, later adopting an anthropomorphic crocodile, Sobek. Eager to prove himself a hero despite his connection to Black Adam, his brother-in-law and mentor, he is instead discredited by Amanda Waller and the Suicide Squad when he accidentally kills Persuader in a fit of rage to protect his sister and is ostracized. He is also convinced his powers are indirectly responsible for disasters in Kahndaq and is convinced to adopt his human form before being eaten and killed by Sobek, who reveals himself as Famine of the Four Horsemen of Apokolips. His powers and remains are discovered by Isis and Black Adam, the former killed shortly after and expressed regret in her advice of restraint to Adam.

Their shared deaths would be a catalyst for Adam's amperage during "World War III" and despite their reservations, the Teen Titans erected a statue of him post-mortem in his honor. Amon later returned as a reanimated Black Lantern corpse but due to his deceased body being restored to a better form by Adam to ensure a peaceful afterlife, he retained the Wizard Shazam's power innately and gains a chance to kill Sobek himself and die as a hero from the perspective of the Kahndaqi people.

Osiris later returns to life once again and fully healed but finds Isis and Black Adam petrified. Vowing to free them and lead Kahndaq to a more prosperous time, he finds himself pressured by the Teen Titans to account for his crimes in murdering the Persuader. When offered by Deathstroke in joining his Titans team to aid in the resurrection of his son in return for aid in undoing Isis and Black Adam's petrification, he accepts and helps kill Ryan Choi (the hero Atom) but clashes with his teammates while being unwittingly corrupted by Shazam villain, Blaze. Using Freddy's (the new Captain Marvel) power, he resurrects Isis and depowers him as a result but his past killing with her powers temporarily leaves her mentally unstable. When she recognizes his increasing use of brutal tactics, corruption, and Amon's allegiance to Deathstroke causes the Justice League to make an appearance in Kahndaq, she asserts herself as the ultimate authority by demoting Amon, asserts Kahndaq's independent sovereignty with intent to withdraw from the United Nations, and forbids the Justice League from being in Kahndaq on grounds of war from herself.

Osiris remained loyal to Deathstroke when his plan to resurrect Jericho proved true. When the team splits and the resurrection device is destroyed, he enlists Sivana's aid to help rebuild the device on grounds he helps kill the Wizard Shazam, the scientist unaware of his death. However, following the New 52, a new iteration of Amon Tomaz briefly surfaced until his history is reverted back to the period where he was killed by Sobek.

=== Description and personality ===
Osiris is described as being kind-hearted and trusting to the extent of naiveté with strong loyalty to both his family and country. When characterized by Eric Wallace during his Titans run, he is described as the "reluctant powerhouse" of Deathstroke's Titans mercenary team. He is also portrayed in a darker direction, primarily obsessed with bringing back both Black Adam (and Isis) from their state of petrification.

=== Powers and abilities ===
As a ordinary human, he possessed no inherent powers but had willpower necessary to resist brainwashing and was a bass player. The character's chief powers originated from being empowered, be it through a connection Black Adam or later gaining an innate connection following his resurrection. By speaking "Black Adam", he is transformed into a demigod-like empowered form with the same powers as Black Adam, derived from select Egyptian deities and is considered superior in power from those empowering the Marvel Family. Uniquely, some of his powers are also derived from a connection to Isis, allowing for powers like projecting lightning, depowering others, and establishes a link between himself and his sister.

S	Stamina of Shu	A counterpart of the Stamin of Atlas; it grants Osiris a undefine level of enhanced stamina.
H	Speed of Horus	A counterpart of the Speed of Mercury; Osiris is granted superhuman speed and flight; Osiris's speed was estimated to rank at least 16,000 miles per hour (roughly Mach 20).
A	Strength of Amon	A counterpart of the Strength of Hercules; Osis is granted superhuman strength. Osiris's strength level was estimated to rank at least 6,000 tons. Within stories, his strength is stated to be comparable to a Kryptonian. He also proved powerful enough to contend with other super-powered beings with great strength (i.e Supergirl).
Z	Wisdom of Zeuheti	A counterpart of the Wisdom of Solomon; Osiris is at least granted with enhanced awareness and an eidetic memory, with the power traditionally also granting greater understanding of mathematics, combat strategy, languages, and sciences. He once also showcased an accute understanding of architecture that enabled him to build hospitals.
A	Power of Aten	A counterpart of the Power of Zeus; traditionally granting an affinity of magic for Black Adam, Osiris's specific usage is mostly undefined although he displayed some spell-casting potential in a failed attempt to resurrect Black Adam in one story.
M	Courage of Mehen	A counterpart of the Courage of Achilles; Osiris a granted a level of physical invulnerability, magical invulnerability, and resistance to mind control and poisons.

=== Other versions ===
- A newer version of the character was briefly introduced; this version is a Kahndaqi-born teenager recruited by Sons of Adam, a group of revolutionaries working on freeing Kahndaq from Ibac's dictatorship, due to his high knowledge on occult and history of Kahndaq which includes spells able to resurrect Black Adam. Just before he completes it, he is killed by a stray bullet from the military and his older sister, Adrianna, tearfully completes it in his place to revive Adam. After DC Rebirth, however, his old history is restored.
- In the alternate timeline of the Flashpoint event, Osiris is a prince of Kahndaq and member of the H.I.V.E. council. He voted for using nuclear weapons to end the war in Western Europe between Aquaman and Wonder Woman, believing the death of his sister, Isis was caused by them. When Traci Thirteen battles the council, she is able to defeat him by casting spells ending in her saying 'Shazam!' causing Osiris to turn back.

== Reception and critical impact ==
Since the characters' creation, Osiris has received mixed to positive reactions; his initial comic book debut was received positively, being seen as a stepping stone for creating more interesting stories with Black Adam's character. In reaction to his death in 52 #43, one review considered it done for "shock value" and derided the series for developing the character before killing him off. Conversely, Osiris's return during the 2008 Titans series has received criticism for single-noted characterization, Osiris cited among the supporting cast whose motivation is stated repeatedly with little development throughout the story arc. Another IGN review for Titans #24 noted the character as the "star" of the team but criticized his scenes as "cringe-worthy" and stated that his contradictory actions made it difficult for him and others to "act in accordance to any rhyme or reason.". Osiris is also known as one of the few noteworthy Arab characters in DC Comics; in relation to his role as Amon Tomaz in the Black Adam film, Bohdi Sabongui noted "It's still rare to see an Arabic protagonist, especially in superhero movies," and that "A big part of Black Adam and why I'm so excited about it is that even though I'm not a superhero, I still get this opportunity to paint Middle Eastern and North African people in this positive light, which isn't something that I saw so much growing up."

== In other media ==
- A character inspired by Amon Tomaz named Behrad Tarazi appears in Legends of Tomorrow, portrayed by Shayan Sobhian as an adult and by Bodhi Sabongui in flashbacks. He originally hails from a possible dystopian future in 2042, in which he possessed aerokinesis via the Air Totem before he was killed by A.R.G.U.S. After the Legends erase the dystopian future, a revived and altered Behrad joins them.
- Amon Tomaz appears in Black Adam, portrayed by Bodhi Sabongui. This version is Adrianna Tomaz's teenage son who is a fan of superheroes and keeps Teth-Adam in his room, following him after his escape. Later, he finds out that Ishmael Gregor, his mother's partner, is actually the militant leader of Intergang, and escapes with the Crown of Sabbac but is captured. Upon Adam saving him from being killed by Ishmael, Amon discovers that Ishmael's death allowed him to be reborn as the demon Sabbac. Amon, Adrianna, and Karim rally the people of Kahndaq to fight Sabbac's skeleton army while Teth-Adam and the Justice Society defeat Sabbac.

== Collected editions ==
- Blackest Night: Rise of the Black Lanterns (collects The Power of Shazam! #48)
- Titans: Villains for Hire (collects Titans 24-27 and Titans: Villains for Hire Special #1)
