= Master Comics =

American comic book anthology series

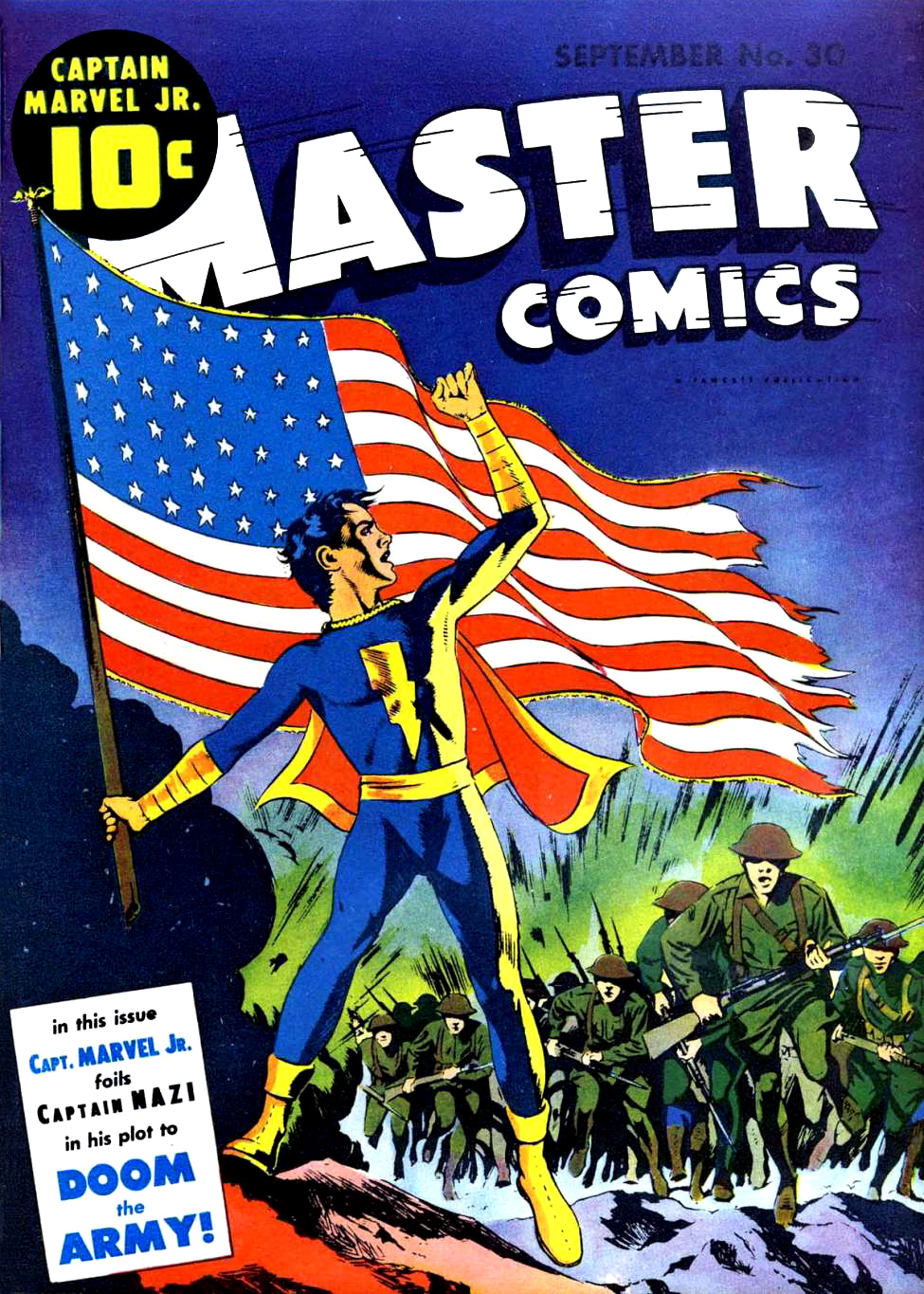
- Captain Marvel, Jr., from Master Comics #30 (Sept. 1942). Cover art by Mac Raboy.

Publication information
- Publisher: Fawcett Comics
- Schedule: Monthly
- Format: Anthology
- Genre: Superhero
- Publication date: Mar. 1940 – Apr. 1953
- No. of issues: 133
- Main character(s): Captain Marvel, Jr. Bulletman; Minute-Man; Master Man

Master Comics is a monthly ongoing comic book anthology series that began its 133-issue run (cover dated March 1940 – April 1953) during the 1930s and 1940s period known as the Golden Age of Comic Books. Published by Fawcett Comics, it contained features starring superhero characters including Master Man, in the first six issues only, Bulletman, Minute-Man, and its best-known character, Captain Marvel, Jr., part of the lighthearted Marvel Family.

== Publisher ==
Master Comics was also the name of an unrelated comic book publishing company that produced one series, the 24-issue horror comic Dark Mysteries (July 1951 - July 1955).
