= Harold Sharp =

American judoka (1927–2021)

- Born: 1927
- Died: 2021
- Style: Judo
- Rank: 10th Dan Judo

Harold "Hal" Sharp (1927 – March 21, 2021) was an American judoka and author of books on judo.

== Personal life ==
Sharp was born in 1927. Sharp was deployed with the army in 1945 to Japan and learned about martial arts. He attended Los Angeles State College.

== Judo competition ==
He earned his first black belt from the Kodokan. In Japan, he was assigned as being a body guard of Emperor Hirohito. He was a student of Takahiko Ishikawa. He was the winner of the first Foreign Judo Championships in 1954. He became captain of the 1955 US Goodwill Team. Sharp though stated that the Captain was John Osaka and he was a member of the team.

== Author ==
He co-authored The Sport of Judo, Boys' Judo: Sport, Defense, and The Techniques of Judo (Tuttle Martial Arts). The Techniques of Judo, originally published by Tuttle in 1960, has been cited as one of the foundational English-language manuals on the art. It blends traditional Japanese instruction with modern explanations suitable for Western students. These books sold over 250,000 copies. He served as a technical advisor for "Mrs Judo", a movie about Keiko Fukuda. He is a 10th dan in Judo, promoted by the Nanka Judo Yudanshakai on October 31, 2020. His final book was "The Road To Black Belt".

== Judo career ==
Sharp had a number of Judo friends including that of Charles Palmer (judoka) He also served as instructor for Star Trek's William Shatner. In 1968, Sharp attended a martial arts forum at Black Belt Magazine representing Judo.

== Honors ==
Sharp was inducted into the USA Judo Hall of Fame in 2019. Sharp died on March 21, 2021.
