= Eugen Semitjov =

Swedish writer

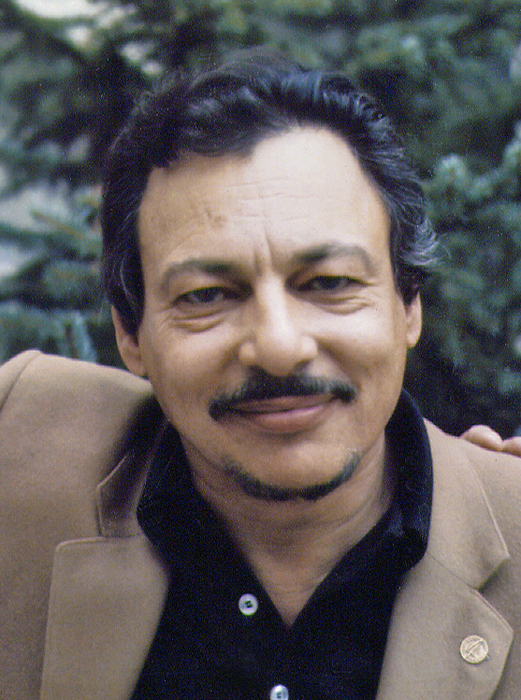
- Eugen Semitjov ca 1970.
- Born: 22 May 1923; Stockholm
- Died: 12 June 1987 (aged 64); Stockholm
- Occupation: Author
- Known for: Expert in spacecraft, artist, science fiction writer

Eugen Semitjov (22 May 1923 - 12 June 1987) was a Swedish journalist, writer and artist of Russian descent, born in Sweden.

== Background ==
Semitjov started drawing in 1942 during his military service in Sweden. He was an expert on spacecraft, especially Soviet ones, and worked as a translator from Russian during Yuri Gagarin's visit to Sweden. He also often worked as an illustrator for Aftonbladet, especially when the subject was related to space technology. He covered the Apollo space programme as a journalist in Florida. As a Russian speaker, he obtained rare interviews with people involved in the Soviet space programme. Semitjov was awarded the Stora Journalistpriset in Sweden in 1972 for his work as a journalist.

His non-fiction books were about the actress Greta Garbo, science, speculative science such as possible future space colonies and spaceships, with illustrations by well-known space artists such as Fred Gambino and David A. Hardy. He also wrote a small number of novels for young people. At a time when the belief that aliens had visited Earth was widespread, he published a book on the subject, deliberately giving it a title and cover to attract the 'true believers', while the majority of the book's content was devoted to debunking a number of well-known UFO cases.

As well as writing books, he was the author of the science fiction comic Allan Kämpe, first published in December 1942. At first glance the stories appear to be a straight copy of Flash Gordon, but the comic has more in common with Sidney Jordan's 'Jeff Hawke'.

He was a leading member of the Swedish Space Movement Association when it was founded in 1984 to promote interest in space travel in Sweden. In 1991, the association changed its name to the Swedish Space Society and then gradually went dormant during the first half of the 1990s, only to be revived in 2012. After Semitjov's death in 1987, the Swedish space movement established a prize in his memory, the Eugen Semitjov Prize. In may 2025 a feature length documentary about Eugen Semitjov was released.
