= Allan Kämpe =

Swedish science fiction comic

Allan Kämpe was a Swedish science fiction comic, created by Eugen Semitjov in December 1942.

== Setting ==
It all begins when Allan and his wife Eva Kämpe are flying around near the North Pole. They experience a possible fuel leak and crash in the cold winter landscape. Allan and Eva are then rescued by four people who claim to be the heads of something called Hjärntrusten ("Braintrust"). They are shown around, and get to see some technology that clearly is very advanced. Allan and Eva decide to join the Braintrust, and so the adventures begin.

== Characters ==
=== Allan and Eva Kämpe ===
Allan and Eva Kämpe are both pilots working for the Braintrust who fly aeroplanes and spaceships of various kinds. Eva is a self-willed and intelligent woman interested in new technological inventions.

== Technology ==
The Braintrust is formed by people who believe they can solve many of the world's problems by using science and advanced technology. Indeed, both the Braintrust as well as "the bad guys" make use of futuristic and advanced technology. A few examples of this includes: a form of nuclear powered ion thruster, a wide range of spaceships, ringformed space stations, "televisors", and technology for altering the weather. These things were, and most still are, decades before their time, considering this comic was drawn in the 1940s and the 1950s.
