= Captain Marvel Adventures =

Comic book anthology series

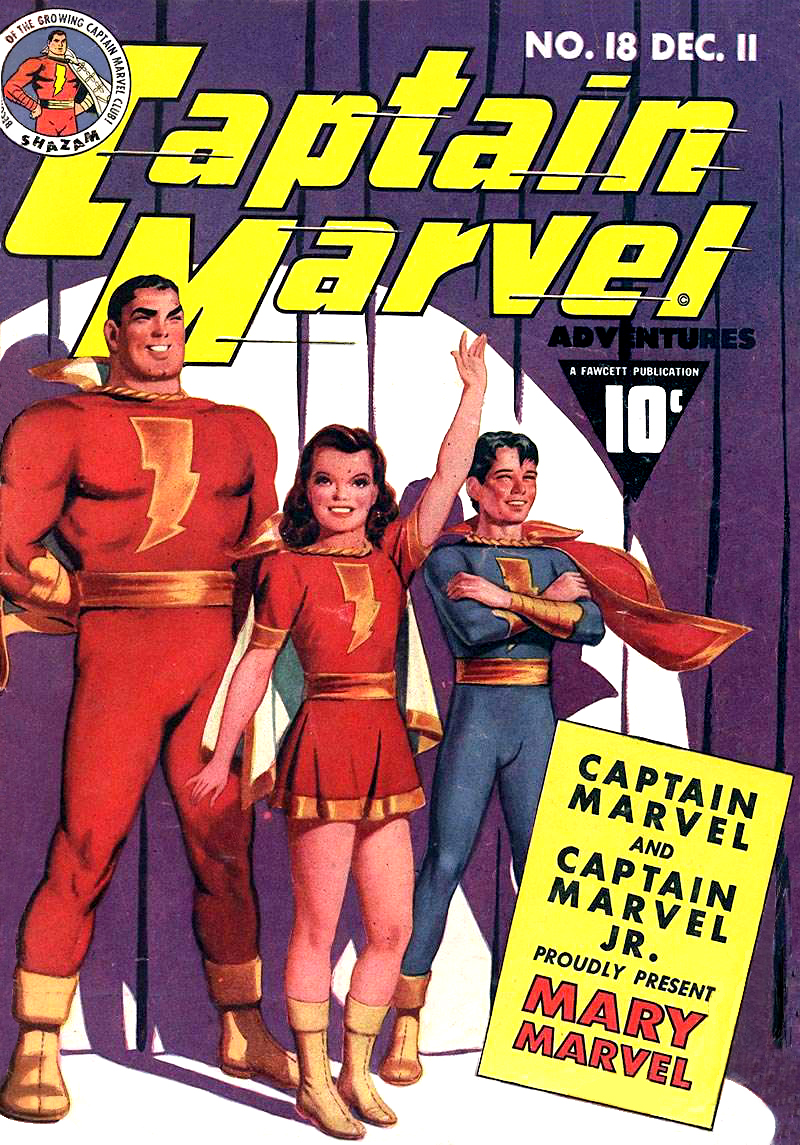
- Issue #18 depicting the original Marvel Family: Captain Marvel (left), Mary Marvel (center) and Captain Marvel Jr. (right)

Publication information
- Publisher: Fawcett Comics
- Schedule: Monthly; Every third Friday; Biweekly
- Format: Anthology
- Genre: Superhero
- Publication date: March 1941 – November 1953
- No. of issues: 150
- Main character: Captain Marvel

Creative team
- Written by: Otto Binder, William Woolfolk, Ed Herron, Joe Simon
- Artist(s): C. C. Beck, Pete Costanza, Jack Kirby
- Editor(s): Ed Herron, Wendell Crowley

Captain Marvel Adventures is a long running comic book anthology series that was published by Fawcett Comics, starring Captain Marvel during the Golden Age of Comic Books.

== Publication history ==
The series was the first solo series starring the superhero after he was the star of the anthology title Whiz Comics. It was first released in 1941. The premiere issue was written and drawn by Joe Simon and Jack Kirby. The series was a huge success at the time. It sold 14 million copies in 1944, and was at one point being published bi-weekly with a circulation of 1.3 million copies an issue. Several issues of Captain Marvel Adventures included a blurb on their covers proclaiming the series the "Largest Circulation of Any Comic Magazine". The series would be cancelled with issue #150 in November 1953.

Outside of Captain Marvel stories, there were other featured character stories within the anthology every now and then, like Captain Kid.

Otto Binder and C.C. Beck introduced supervillains like Ibac in issue #8, Mister Mind and the Monster Society of Evil in issue #26 and Mister Atom in issue #78, which would remain recurring antagonists for the superhero. The series' most significant debut was introducing Mary Marvel in issue #18, along with the formation of the Marvel Family. Also introduced was Mr. Tawky Tawny in issue #79.

== Legacy ==
The success of the comic series lead DC Comics to file a lawsuit on Fawcett Comics regarding the character being too similar to Superman, which Fawcett would forfeit, and DC would win.

== Collected editions ==
- The Monster Society of Evil: Deluxe Limited Collector's Edition (1989, American Nostalgia Library, ISBN 0-948248-07-6). Compiled and designed by Mike Higgs. Reprints the entire "Monster Society of Evil" story arc that ran for two years in Captain Marvel Adventures #22–46 (1943–1945), in which Captain Marvel meets Mister Mind and the Monster Society of Evil. This oversized, slipcased hardcover book was strictly limited to 3,000 numbered copies.

== Publication run and format ==
Captain Marvel Adventures was published by Fawcett Comics from March 1941 through November 1953 and ran for 150 issues.

According to publication records, the series was initially released as a monthly title and later shifted publication frequency during its run. The comic functioned as an anthology series centered on Captain Marvel and related characters within the Marvel Family.

== See also ==
- National Comics Publications, Inc. v. Fawcett Publications, Inc.
