= Genius Jones =

- Genius Jones, artist Stan Kaye.

Publication information
- Publisher: DC Comics
- First appearance: Adventure Comics #77 (August 1942)
- Created by: Alfred Bester (writer); Stan Kaye (artist)

In-story information
- Alter ego: Johnny Jones
- Team affiliations: Team 13
- Notable aliases: Answer Man
- Abilities: Gifted inventor Genius-level intelligence

Genius Jones is a comic book character from the Golden Age of Comic Books who first appeared in the DC Comics published, Adventure Comics #77 (August 1942). He was created by Alfred Bester and Stan Kaye.

Johnny "Genius" Jones, a young boy, is stranded on a desert island with 734 books. Jones reads every book, memorizing every bit of information from them. He ultimately burns the books to attract the attention of a passing ship. Once back in civilization he sets himself up as the Answer Man, a costumed hero who answers questions and solves crimes for a dime. He has no superpowers but has a very advanced lab. He is also aided by an adult sidekick named Mr. Oldster.

== Publication history ==
Genius Jones (created by science fiction writer Alfred Bester), debuted in Adventure Comics #77 (August 1942) with "The Case of the Off-Key Crooner". He called himself the Answer Man, although in a twist that pre-dated the Elongated Man by nearly 20 years, he made no attempt to hide his secret identity. His costume of purple gray tights, red cape and boots, and yellow helmet was designed by Stan Kaye, who continued drawing the feature after Bester left.

His first full cover appearance was on the cover of All Funny Comics #5 in the winter of 1944-45. Jones' stories usually have imaginative titles, like "Did You Ever See A Dream Walking?", "Way Down Yonder In the Corn Field", "Fish Are Such Liars", "The Enigma of the Nonagenarian Narrator", and Adventure #88's "The Death of Genius Jones".

Alfred Bester's last Genius Jones tale (according to the Grand Comics Database) was Adventure Comics #92's "The Saving Scot and The Gypsy Gyp". Bester left to write science fiction novels, (such as The Demolished Man), and travel articles for the magazine Holiday.

Genius Jones features continued in Adventure Comics until #102. Following issue #102, the More Fun superhero stable of Superboy, Green Arrow, Aquaman, and Johnny Quick moved to Adventure while Genius Jones, more a humor feature than a superhero one, moved to More Fun. Jones' More Fun adventures started with #108 where he shared the cover with Harry Boltinoff's twin detectives Dover and Clover. They alternated covers until the introduction of Howard Post's "Jimminy and the Magic Book" in #121. "Jimminy and the Magic Book" appeared on the covers during More Fun's final year. More Fun, which had been DC's oldest title, was cancelled in late 1947.

Genius's adventures in More Fun had titles like "Genius Meets Genius", "The Tell-Tale Tornado" and "Battle of the Pretzel Benders", according to the Comic Values Annual 2001. The last one, "The Case of the Gravy Spots", appeared in More Fun #126. These and other tales were probably written by Whitney Ellsworth.

In 1943, Jones also appeared in the newly-christened All-Funny Comics. He continued in All-Funny until #19. His weirdest titled tale "The Mystery of Etaoin Shrdlu!", in which he solved a mystery at a typing school, appeared in All-Funny #13.

Genius Jones disappeared from the DC Universe in the next-to-last issue of More Fun Comics (#126) in late 1947.

=== One Year Later ===
Genius Jones recently resurfaced into the pages of Tales of the Unexpected in 2007, (collected in the TPB 'Architecture & Mortality'), first in dream sequences hinting at Doctor Thirteen's demise before the universe-altering effects of Infinite Crisis, then offering his services for his usual fee in a convoluted adventure involving other forgotten Golden and Silver Age characters: Anthro, I...Vampire, Infectious Lass, Captain Fear, Haunted Tank, and Count Julius from the Primate Patrol. He reveals that he is aware of the fourth wall, cryptically talking about the commercial wars between Marvel Comics and DC Comics, and how DC's editors, the Architects, had to reboot or modify their respective fictional worlds to increase sales. They confront the Architects directly and try to justify their continued existence. They seem to have succeeded, and are in fact pursuing Captain Fear, kidnapped by Black Manta, when Dr. Thirteen discovers an old DC comic from 1969. It makes him realize they are characters in a story. The story ends with the rest of the characters entering an elevator, as Dr. Thirteen begs the reader not to turn the page.

== Powers and abilities ==
Genius Jones had no superpowers, but possessed a genius-level intellect and is a gifted inventor.
