= Mac Raboy =

American cartoonist, 1914-1967

- Born: Emmanuel (or Manuel) Raboy; April 9, 1914 New York City
- Died: December 12, 1967 (aged 53)
- Area: Penciller
- Notable works: Captain Marvel Jr. Flash Gordon Sunday strip

Emmanuel "Mac" Raboy (April 9, 1914 – December 12, 1967) was an American comics artist best known for his comic-book work on Fawcett Comics' Captain Marvel Jr. and as the Sunday comic-strip artist of Flash Gordon for more than 20 years. Cartoonist Drew Friedman has stated, "Raboy was an expert technician with pen and brush, and his lush covers are some of the most unusually beautiful ever to grace comic books".

== Early life ==
Raboy was born in New York City on April 9, 1914, to a Jewish family. (The April 9 date is taken from Roger Hill's biography Mac Raboy: Master of the Comics. His birthdate has also been cited as April 17, 1914, in other sources. Hill's biography also gives his birth name as "Manuel", but Friedman's book Heroes of the Comics lists it as "Emmanuel.") Raboy's father had emigrated from Romania; the family name's spelling was changed from "Raboi". His father worked in a hat factory before moving to North Dakota for a time to work as a blacksmith and horse handler. He moved to Connecticut to work on the family dairy farm, and finally settled in the Bronx. His father wrote poetry, political essays, and several books, including The Jewish Cowboy, about his North Dakota experience.

== Career ==
Raboy began his art career with the Works Progress Administration during the Great Depression. In the 1940s he began working with the Harry A. Chesler studio of comics artists. Raboy began drawing comic books and gained fame as the illustrator for Captain Marvel, Jr. and the Green Lama. Raboy was a great admirer of Alex Raymond, and "kept a portfolio of Alex Raymond's "Flash Gordon" comics by his side for inspiration and guidance as he worked". In the spring of 1946, King Features hired Raboy to continue the Sunday page adventures of Flash Gordon, which he continued to work on until his death.

== Death ==
Raboy was diagnosed with cancer in 1967, and died that December. Hill's biography gives the date as December 22; other sources have listed it as December 12.
