= Minute-Man =

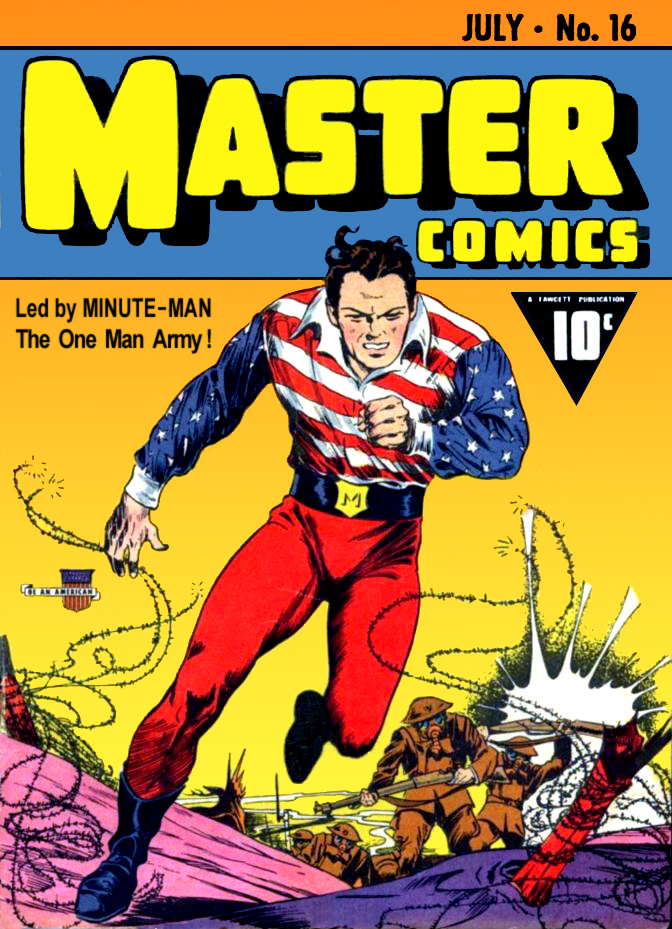

Publication information
- Publisher: Fawcett Comics (1941-1972); DC Comics (1972-present)
- First appearance: Master Comics #11 (February 1941)
- Created by: Charlie Sultan

In-story information
- Alter ego: Jack Weston
- Team affiliations: S.T.A.R. Labs; Office of Strategic Services; All-Star Squadron
- Abilities: Peak human physical condition

Minute-Man (Jack Weston) is a superhero appearing in comics published Fawcett Comics and later DC Comics.

== Publication history ==
Named after the minutemen of the American Revolution and sporting a costume inspired by the American flag, he was originally published by Fawcett Comics in Master Comics #11-49 (February 1941 - April 1944). He also had his own self-titled comic for three issues published from summer 1941 to spring 1942.

He the second of a line of patriotic heroes from the Golden Age of Comics; preceded by MLJs The Shield in January 1940 and followed by Timely's Captain America in March 1941.

Along with other Fawcett characters, he was purchased by DC Comics and made brief appearances in the Shazam! comics in 1976, and the Power of Shazam! comic in 1995 and 1996.

== Fictional character biography ==
During World War II, Jack Weston is an army private in prime physical condition who dons a patriotic costume and becomes the Minute-Man, a "One Man Army" who combats enemy agents. His double identity is known to his superior officer, General Milton, who sends the Minute-Man on unsanctioned missions behind enemy lines. Minute-Man is a member of a group of local Fawcett City heroes, the Crime Crusaders Club.

According to Jess Nevins' Encyclopedia of Golden Age Superheroes, "his nemesis is the femme fatale Illyria, Queen of the Spies, but he also fights rebellious Haitian natives, robot spies, ten foot tall Nazi monsters, the Black Poet, agents of the Black Dragon Society, the evil Toymaker, mad scientists, mummies, vampires, and head hunters".

Prior to Crisis on Infinite Earths, Minute-Man was said to exist on Earth-S, home of the Fawcett heroes. He makes his first appearance in Shazam! when he rescues Billy from Mister Mind and the Rainbow Squad, who have captured and gagged him. Cap feels unable to fight females, so Minute-Man shows him he can do it, inspiring Cap to beat the Squad, and reveal that its leader, Mr. Wonderful, is actually Mind. In this incarnation, the character was also a member of the Squadron of Justice, a team of Fawcett characters who joined forces with the Justice League and Justice Society. He was incorporated into the mainstream DC Universe following the Crisis.

In Justice Society of America (vol. 3) #3, Vandal Savage orders an unnamed assassin to kill Jack Weston and his children and grandchildren to stop their bloodline.

=== Infinite Frontier ===
A new version of Minute-Man, named Terry, appears in the series One-Star Squadron. He has super strength and invulnerability gained from the vitamin Miraclo.

== Reception ==
In American Comic Book Chronicles: 1940-1944, Kurt Mitchell and Roy Thomas discussed the merits of the early Minute-Man stories: "The strip began as a lazy imitation of Captain America: given a top-secret commission to ferret out and smash subversive threats to the nation as the patriotically garbed Minute-Man, Jack Weston posed as an ordinary private as cover. There was no origin, no explanation for his extraordinary fighting prowess, no kid sidekick or grotesque Nazi villains, for Minute-Man was stuck in the world of fictitious fascist nations that [Joe] Simon and [Jack] Kirby scorned as too timid for the times".
