= Whiz Comics =

Comic book anthology series

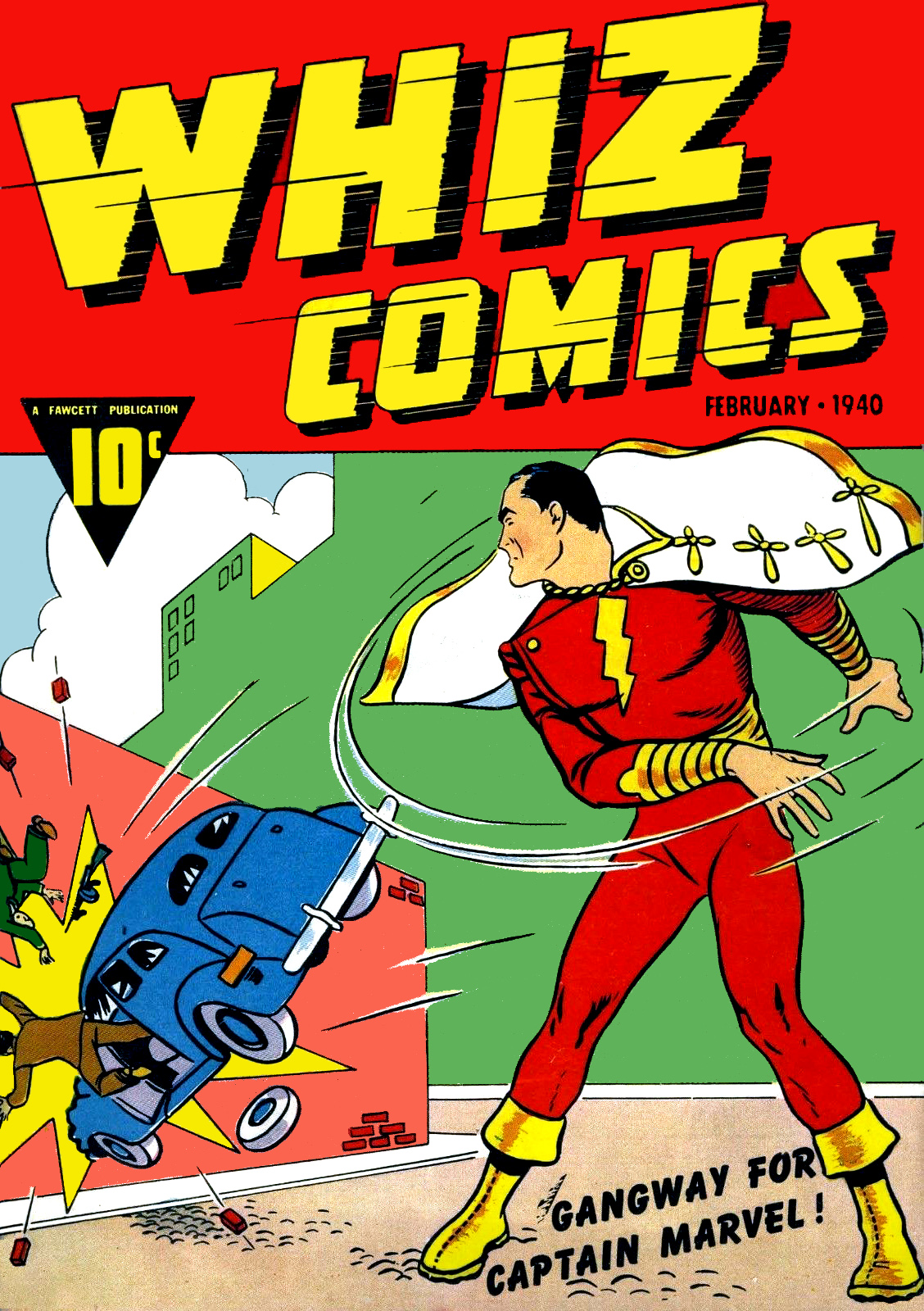
- Whiz Comics #2 (February 1940), the first appearance of Captain Marvel, cover art by C. C. Beck.

Publication information
- Publisher: Fawcett Comics
- Schedule: Monthly
- Format: Anthology
- Genre: Superhero
- Publication date: Feb. 1940 – June 1953
- No. of issues: 155
- Main character: Captain Marvel

Whiz Comics is an anthology comic book series that was published by former American comic book publishing company, Fawcett Publications between February 1940 until June 1953. It is widely known for being the comic run in which hugely popular superhero character Captain Marvel (Shazam) made his debut.

== Publication history ==
In 1939, Fawcett Publications was trying to capitalize on the ongoing superhero boom spearheaded by characters like Superman and Batman. It was then that writer Bill Parker came up with the idea for a team of superheroes, each possessing the power of a different mythical character. The idea was eventually modified into a single character with all these powers, and thus Captain Marvel, known later as Shazam, was born. The first issue published of Whiz Comics was issue #2, published with a cover-date of Feb. 1940. Fawcett created two black-and-white ashcan #1 issues to solicit advertisers and to secure the copyrights to the material. The two copies were identical but carried different titles: Flash Comics and Thrill Comics; the Captain Marvel character was called "Captain Thunder" in a near-identical story. When Fawcett went to press with the magazine, the first issue was retitled as Whiz Comics, a name inspired by the company's bawdy humor magazine Captain Billy's Whiz Bang. Further complicating matters, when they got to issue #3, Fawcett, through either mistake or intent, used the number twice. Whiz Comics 3(A) was released 12 Jan 1940 and Whiz Comics 3(B) was released 23 Feb 1940. Thus, if viewed from the perspective of the second #3 (and, therefore, all the issues that followed it), Whiz #2 unofficially became Whiz #1.

The cover art for the first issue showed Captain Marvel throwing a vehicle at a wall, and was inspired by the cover of Action Comics #1, which shows Superman lifting a car. The first issue was written by Bill Parker, who also wrote several other issues before Whiz became popular and other writers were hired.

Throughout its run, Captain Marvel continued to be the star attraction of Whiz Comics, with his sales surpassing that of DC stalwarts like Batman (Detective Comics and Batman) and Superman (Action Comics and Superman). With half a dozen spin-offs and the honor of being the first superhero to appear on film, Captain Marvel and Whiz Comics were outselling Superman by a huge margin. In 1941, DC sued Fawcett Publications, alleging that Captain Marvel was so similar to Superman as to violate DC's intellectual property rights. The lawsuit took 12 years to resolve, with Fawcett having to pay $400,000 in damages and cease publication of all Captain Marvel-related material. This ended the 13-year run of Whiz Comics.

The name 'Captain Marvel' was shortly trademarked by then up and coming company Marvel Comics, and in 1972 DC bought all the creative rights of Fawcett publication's superheroes. Fawcett's and DC's Captain Marvel has since been renamed "Shazam" to avoid trademark infringement.

Copyright was not renewed on many Whiz Comics issues as was required at the time, causing them to fall into the public domain and can now be freely accessed through the internet.

== Recurring features ==
Whiz contained the following features depicting adventures of various superhero characters:

- Captain Marvel
- Ibis the Invincible
- Spy Smasher
- Golden Arrow
- Dan Dare
- Lance O'Casey
- Scoop Smith

== See also ==
- Captain Marvel Adventures
