= List of Justice League Unlimited episodes =

Justice League Unlimited is an American superhero animated television series that was produced by Warner Bros. Animation and aired on Cartoon Network. Featuring a wide array of superheroes from the DC Comics universe, and specifically based on the Justice League superhero team, it is a direct sequel to the previous Justice League animated series. Justice League Unlimited debuted on July 31, 2004, on Toonami and ended on May 13, 2006. It was also the final series set in the long-running DC Animated Universe, which started with Batman: The Animated Series in 1992. Unlike its predecessor's two/three-part episode format, Justice League Unlimited consists entirely of single episodes, except for the first-season finale.

== Series overview ==
Season	Episodes	Originally released	
Season	Episodes	First released	Last released
1	13	July 31, 2004	January 29, 2005
2	13	February 5, 2005	July 23, 2005
3	13	September 17, 2005	May 13, 2006

== Episodes ==
=== Season 1 (2004–2005) ===
No. overall	No. in season	Title	Directed by	Written by	Original release date	U.S. viewers (millions)
1	1	"Initiation"	Joaquim Dos Santos	Stan Berkowitz	July 31, 2004	N/A
The Justice League expands its operations, enlisting new recruits from across the globe. One of the newest is Green Arrow, who has repeatedly refused to join the League, until he is teleported onto the League's newly rebuilt Watchtower. Although hesitant to still join, he finds himself joining a mission with Green Lantern, Captain Atom and Supergirl, as they attempt to stop a nuclear-powered robot rampaging across Eastern Asia. After the mission is successful Green Arrow once again attempts to refuse to join but changes his mind upon catching sight of Black Canary.
2	2	"For the Man Who Has Everything"	Dan Riba	J. M. DeMatteis	August 7, 2004	1.56
Batman and Wonder Woman arrive at the Fortress of Solitude to celebrate Superman's birthday. They soon discover that he is being held captive by Mongul in the fortress, and is under the effects of a parasitic plant known as the Black Mercy, which has left him prisoner in a dream world where Krypton was never destroyed and he leads an idyllic life. Batman and Wonder Woman find themselves forced to snap him out of this fantasy, knowing it could prove disastrous for the League. Note: This episode is adapted from Superman Annual #11, written by Alan Moore and illustrated by Dave Gibbons in 1985.
3	3	"Hawk and Dove"	Joaquim Dos Santos	Story by : Ron Zimmerman; Teleplay by : Robert Goodman	August 21, 2004	N/A
Wonder Woman teams up with two super-powered brothers, Hawk and Dove, after learning that Ares plans to escalate a civil war raging in Europe. The pair soon find themselves assisting her when they learn that Ares' scheme involves giving one side access to a powerful war machine called the Annihilator which he asked Hephaestus to forge for him. Note: Hawk and Dove are voiced by Fred Savage and Jason Hervey, who previously portrayed brothers in The Wonder Years.
4	4	"Fearful Symmetry"	Joaquim Dos Santos	Story by : Stan Berkowitz; Teleplay by : Robert Goodman	September 4, 2004	N/A
Green Arrow and Question investigate Supergirl's disturbing dreams, after she begins experiencing them more recently. Their investigation soon leads them to discovering a secret organization called Project Cadmus, who have created a clone of Supergirl named Galatea whilst she had been recovering from her fight against Superman on Earth. All three soon become involved in investigating what Cadmus is planning, unaware of who was involved in Galatea's creation. Note: Galatea is based on Power Girl. The episode begins a long narrative arc focusing on the conflict between the League and Cadmus which is resolved in the second season penultimate episode "Divided We Fall".
5	5	"Kid Stuff"	Joaquim Dos Santos	Henry Gilroy	August 14, 2004	N/A
Mordred rebels against Morgaine le Fey and uses the Amulet of First Magic to remove all adults from Earth and lord over every child on the planet. Seeking to stop this, le Fey discovers a loophole that can allow the Justice League to stop this, and transforms Superman, Batman, Wonder Woman, and Green Lantern into children to combat Mordred. Despite some setbacks, the group swiftly do what they can to thwart Mordred's plans being conducted from an amusement park. Note: Based loosely on elements of the DC Comics events JLA: World Without Grown Ups and Young Justice: Sins of Youth.
6	6	"This Little Piggy"	Dan Riba	Paul Dini	August 28, 2004	0.65
While on a stakeout in Gotham City to stop some members of Intergang, Wonder Woman and Batman encounter the centuries-old enchantress Circe who transforms the former into a pig as revenge against Diana's mother Hippolyta. Batman and Zatanna work together to return her to normal, while B'wana Beast attempts to find the "Wonder Pig" before she is butchered at a slaughterhouse. Note: This episode features the singing of actress/singer Rachel York, who performs "Lulu's Back in Town" by Al Dubin and Harry Warren.
7	7	"The Greatest Story Never Told"	Dan Riba	Andrew Kreisberg	September 11, 2004	N/A
While the Justice League battles Mordru, several other members of the League are assigned to crowd control duty by Batman to keep civilians out of harm's way. Amongst them, Booster Gold desires to be involved in the fight to gain fame after traveling from the future to be a superhero. However, he soon is placed in a difficult situation, when a female scientist requests his help to stop her colleague, who was transformed into a walking black hole after an experiment gone wrong.
8	8	"The Return"	Joaquim Dos Santos	Story by : Stan Berkowitz; Teleplay by : J. M. DeMatteis	September 18, 2004	N/A
Amazo resurfaces and is heading to Earth after apparently destroying the planet Oa. The League attempts to keep Amazo from taking revenge against Lex Luthor, who works alongside the Atom to create a weapon to neutralize Amazo's nanotechnology. However, Doctor Fate is convinced that Amazo may be lacking focus on a purpose for his existence, and as the League fail to hold it back, it is left to Luthor to convince Amazo to seek another path in its existence.
9	9	"Ultimatum"	Joaquim Dos Santos	Story by : Dwayne McDuffie; Teleplay by : J. M. DeMatteis	December 4, 2004	N/A
The Justice League meets the Ultimen, a popular group of young heroes managed by Maxwell Lord. The Ultimen discover they are clones which are the results of a government experiment in creating superhumans by Cadmus members Amanda Waller and Professor Hamilton and only have a short time to live. In frustration and anger, all of them except for Long Shadow strike out against Cadmus and end up in conflict with Superman, Wonder Woman, Batman, and Aquaman.
10	10	"Dark Heart"	Dan Riba	Warren Ellis	December 11, 2004	N/A
Most of the League battles powerful alien nanotechnology alongside a military unit led by General Wade Eiling. They realize that the waves of self-replicating robots cannot be simply destroyed, so Atom shrinks himself to stop the robots from the inside.
11	11	"Wake the Dead"	Joaquim Dos Santos	Story by : Dwayne McDuffie & Bruce Timm; Teleplay by : Dwayne McDuffie	December 18, 2004	N/A
A trio of high school kids accidentally resurrect Solomon Grundy, making him more powerful than ever but with no memories of his past. Doctor Fate, Amazo, Aquaman, and Hawkgirl assist the League in stopping his rampage. Superman permits Hawkgirl back into the League, despite her being viewed as a traitor by the public.
12	12	"The Once and Future Thing, Part One: Weird Western Tales"	Dan Riba	Dwayne McDuffie	January 22, 2005	1.83
Batman, Wonder Woman, and Green Lantern chase a mysterious being called Chronos to the past, after they catch him attempting to steal equipment from the Watchtower. They soon find themselves in the Old West, whereupon they learn that Chronos has had his technology stolen by bandits led by Tobias Manning. The group quickly work to prevent trouble, working with local legends of the time, but Chronos soon uses his recovered technology to return to his time, creating an even worse situation for the group.
13	13	"The Once and Future Thing, Part Two: Time, Warped"	Joaquim Dos Santos	Dwayne McDuffie	January 29, 2005	N/A
Batman, Green Lantern, and Wonder Woman find themselves in Gotham City in the future, aided by the surviving members of the Justice League (Rex Stewart / Warhawk, Static, and Batman) of that period in battling the Jokerz. The time travelers soon learn that Chronos is making irreparable damage to history that could erase the universe. Aided by their future allies, the group thwart Chronos' plans, although their visit leaves Green Lantern with some difficult news concerning his future. Note: The Jokerz seen in this episode, previously appeared in the film Batman Beyond: Return of the Joker (2000) as the Joker's henchmen.

=== Season 2 (2005) ===
No. overall	No. in season	Title	Directed by	Written by	Original release date	U.S. viewers (millions)
14	1	"The Cat and the Canary"	Joaquim Dos Santos	Story by : Stan Berkowitz; Teleplay by : Robert Goodman	February 5, 2005	N/A
Black Canary convinces Green Arrow to help save her mentor, Wildcat, from his involvement in a superpowered underground fight club known as Metabrawl which is run by Roulette. While on the mission, Green Arrow grows closer to Black Canary and they end up kissing at the end of the night.
15	2	"The Ties That Bind" "Miracles Happen"	Dan Riba	Story by : Jim Steranko; Teleplay by : J. M. DeMatteis	February 12, 2005	N/A
Mister Miracle and Big Barda solicit the League's assistance to free Oberon from Granny Goodness' clutches on Apokolips. The condition for his release is that they free Kalibak from Virman Vundabar. Martian Manhunter refuses, but Flash decides to help out on his own. Apokolips has been embroiled in a conflict between Goodness and Vundabar following Darkseid's death, leaving Flash with a hard mission to handle.
16	3	"The Doomsday Sanction"	Dan Riba	Story by : Dwayne McDuffie; Teleplay by : Robert Goodman	February 19, 2005	1.24
Batman investigates Cadmus by interrogating Waller in her own home. As Justice League discuss about Cadmus situation, Project Cadmus members Amanda Waller, Professor Hamilton, General Eiling, Hugo Strange, Tala, and Professor Milo meet to discuss a possible weapon against the League. Due to being demoted to a lower position after a failed experiment destroys the lab, a disgruntled Milo unleashes Doomsday, who kills him and leaves to battle Superman. Batman discovers that Eiling launched a kryptonite missile at Superman's location, and is forced to severely injure himself to save Superman. Superman sends the defeated Doomsday to the Phantom Zone upon being unable to get information about Cadmus from him and Batman later passes judgment on him, noting that Cadmus has a right to be scared of them.
17	4	"Task Force X"	Joaquim Dos Santos	Story by : Dwayne McDuffie; Teleplay by : Darwyn Cooke	May 21, 2005	N/A
Cadmus has recruited a team of supervillains named Task Force X made up of Deadshot, Plastique, Captain Boomerang, and the Clock King with Rick Flag as their field commander who offers them suspended sentences if they work for him and Cadmus. Their mission is to steal the Annihilator armor from the Watchtower. Task Force X already has knowledge of the passwords and information to get into the watchtower. Unfortunately, the League is unable to defeat them or stop them from stealing the Annihilator. Nonetheless, they are able to deduce which one of their human personnel was working with Cadmus. However, Green Lantern and Martian Manhunter note that they can no longer trust a single person who works for them, noting that anyone could be a traitor.
18	5	"The Balance"	Dan Riba	Story by : Stan Berkowitz; Teleplay by : Dwayne McDuffie	May 28, 2005	1.10
Imprisoned in a mirror, Felix Faust's ghost fools Tala into letting him out. He possesses the Annihilator and casts Hades out of Tartarus. After her armor and lasso's truth-discerning abilities are activated by Queen Hippolyta, Wonder Woman teams up with Hawkgirl to help Hades reclaim his kingdom after Hermes gives her a message from Zeus. Meanwhile, Wonder Woman and Hawkgirl must deal with their anger towards each other following the latter's betrayal. Ultimately, they mend fences and agree to have a respect for each other, and Wonder Woman meets her biological father.
19	6	"Double Date"	Joaquim Dos Santos	Gail Simone	June 4, 2005	1.02
Huntress is expelled from the Justice League by Martian Manhunter for attempting to murder mob boss Steven Mandragora, who killed her parents. She recruits Question to assist her in finishing him off while Green Arrow and Black Canary attempt to thwart their efforts. Huntress and Question ultimately reach the point for her to avenge her parents. When she sees Mandragora has a son, she cannot go through with killing him and instead incapacitates Mandragora. At the end of the night with Mandragora behind bars, Question and Huntress go home together.
20	7	"Clash"	Dan Riba	Story by : Dwayne McDuffie; Teleplay by : J. M. DeMatteis	June 11, 2005	N/A
Lex Luthor's candidacy for president moves forward as Captain Marvel, the newest recruit of the Justice League appears from Fawcett City and seemingly endorses him, which causes tension between him and Superman, who is extremely distrustful of Luthor's motives. Luthor manipulates Superman into fighting Captain Marvel, with the former being humiliated after discovering that the bomb he defused turned out to be a generator. Captain Marvel leaves the Justice League claiming that they aren't acting like the heroes that he adored. At the end, Batman reveals to Superman that he had been baited by Luthor and Amanda Waller as part of a plot to discredit the League.
21	8	"Hunter's Moon" "Mystery in Space"	Joaquim Dos Santos	Story by : Stan Berkowitz; Teleplay by : Dwayne McDuffie	June 18, 2005	N/A
When the Justice League receives a distress call, Hawkgirl, Vigilante, and Vixen investigate. The distress call turns out to be a trap set by the remaining Thanagarian warriors, who blame Hawkgirl for their loss in the Thanagar-Gordanian war, where Hro Talak sacrificed himself to save his men. Hawkgirl also has to deal with her teammates' resentments for her betrayal of the Justice League and her own lingering self-doubts.
22	9	"Question Authority"	Dan Riba	Dwayne McDuffie	June 25, 2005	N/A
After helping Superman defeat Mantis, Eiling reactivates Captain Atom's Air Force Reserve commission. Meanwhile, Question discovers the records about the Justice Lords and Luthor's murder by alternate Superman. Question believes that everything that happened in the Justice Lord timeline will happen in their timeline, leading to an eventual Armageddon. He attempts to prevent this by killing Luthor, only to be captured by Luthor and tortured for information by Doctor Moon at Cadmus' base. Superman and Huntress attempt to rescue him where Superman learns of Professor Hamilton's involvement with Cadmus the day when Superman threatened him to heal Supergirl. As they escape with Question, they are confronted by Captain Atom, who has orders to stop them.
23	10	"Flashpoint"	Joaquim Dos Santos	Dwayne McDuffie	July 2, 2005	N/A
Huntress evacuates with Question while Superman battles Captain Atom. He defeats him and takes his unconscious body to the Watchtower for treatment. Lex Luthor hacks into the Watchtower's computers, seizes control of its main gun, and fires on Cadmus, causing massive collateral damage which falsely implicates the League as responsible. The League tries to help out with the damage, but the public's trust in them is waning. Martian Manhunter has to explain in a phone call to the President about what happened at the Watchtower, placing pressure on the Justice League. Convinced it is an act of revenge, Amanda Waller commands Galatea to attack the Watchtower with an army of Ultimen clones.
24	11	"Panic in the Sky"	Dan Riba	Dwayne McDuffie	July 9, 2005	N/A
The founding members of the Justice League, with the exception of Batman, surrender to the government due to pressure from the President and to show they are not guilty. In the middle of a battle between the rest of the League and the army of Ultimen, Supergirl and Steel battle Galatea to keep her from destroying the Watchtower. Ultimately, Supergirl defeats Galatea and the League prevails. When confronted by Batman, Waller realizes that Luthor was behind the attack and that he framed the League. They all go to confront Luthor, and Waller destroys his project. Before Luthor can be apprehended, Brainiac emerges from inside of him.
25	12	"Divided We Fall"	Joaquim Dos Santos	Dwayne McDuffie	July 16, 2005	0.96
With most of the League unavailable due to different emergencies, the League's founding members battle a fusion between Luthor and Brainiac. Lex and Brainiac temporarily escape, using material from the Dark Heart stored by Cadmus to properly fuse their bodies. The League is tasked with battling robotic Justice Lords, and the Flash saves the day when he runs around the world numerous times to separate and defeat the Luthor/Brainiac fusion. However, he runs so fast that he almost dies as his body is transported to the Speed Force. The League holds a conference noting that they are disbanding the League due to recent events. However, Green Arrow tell them they have saved the world too many times to give up when times are tough. Superman agrees to keep the League, but he promises that there will be changes. Note: This episode concludes the Cadmus story arc which first began in "Fearful Symmetry".
26	13	"Epilogue"	Dan Riba	Story by : Bruce Timm & Dwayne McDuffie; Teleplay by : Dwayne McDuffie	July 23, 2005	1.04
Fifteen years into the future of Batman Beyond, Terry McGinnis learns that he is related to Bruce and comes to the conclusion he is Bruce’s clone; he confronts Amanda Waller, who reveals that she created Project Batman Beyond to continue Bruce's legacy. She knew the world would always need a Batman, so she conspired to first overwrite the reproductive DNA of Terry's father Warren McGinnis with that of Bruce, and then, at the right age, send an assassin (Phantasm) to kill Terry's parents. However, Phantasm did not go through with it, telling Waller it would violate Batman's strong moral code. Waller explains that Terry is not Bruce's clone, but his son, and that he can always choose to live life on his terms and not have to be like Bruce, who pushed his loved ones away out of devotion to his crusade. She shares that while he may not have Bruce's intellect, he does have his heart. Encouraged, Terry plans to propose to Dana Tan and goes home to take care of Bruce before flying off into the night as Batman.: According to Stephen Harber, the episode was originally intended to be the series finale for Justice League Unlimited and the DCAU in general. The decision to end on a Batman-heavy episode was planned as a way of bringing the series full circle, ending the same way that the premiere Batman: The Animated Series episode ("On Leather Wings") began with police spotting a bat-like figure in the night sky.

=== Season 3 (2005–2006) ===
No. overall	No. in season	Title	Directed by	Written by	Original release date	U.S. viewers (millions)
27	1	"I Am Legion"	Joaquim Dos Santos	Dwayne McDuffie	September 17, 2005	N/A
After Lex Luthor escapes from prison, Gorilla Grodd baits him into joining the new Secret Society with a piece of Brainiac technology as Luthor can hear Brainiac in him. Luthor, Key, and Doctor Polaris steal the Spear of Longinus from Blackhawk Island despite the attempts of Flash, Fire, Hawkgirl, and the last surviving Blackhawk to stop them. Note: This new Secret Society is similar in scale to the Legion of Doom (a supervillain group from the Challenge of the Super Friends animated series), and its base is an updated version of the one used by the Legion of Doom. The title of this episode is a variant on a verse from the Bible (Mark 5:9), specifically the last half of the verse that states 'My name is Legion, for we are many.' This is a reference to the Secret Society being a veritable legion of super villains, as well as the appearance of the headquarters of the Legion of Doom, updated for the 21st century and used as the base for the Society.
28	2	"Shadow of the Hawk"	Dan Riba	Story by : Dwayne McDuffie; Teleplay by : J. M. DeMatteis	September 17, 2005	N/A
Hawkgirl agrees to meet with Carter Hall, an archaeologist who has discovered Thanagarian artifacts from ancient Egypt. Batman points out to her that he has been stalking her and the League for some time, however she is attracted to Hall and she decides to go out with him nonetheless. With a suspicious Batman eavesdropping, Carter reveals himself to a confused Hawkgirl as her reincarnated lover from the past and Hawkman. Shadow Thief attempts to steal the artifacts, which results in the destruction of the tomb, devastating Carter who notes he had not been able to divulge the complete story of their history.
29	3	"Chaos at the Earth's Core"	Joaquim Dos Santos	Matt Wayne	September 24, 2005	N/A
Supergirl, Stargirl, S.T.R.I.P.E., and Green Lantern help Warlord liberate Skartaris, a hidden world inside the Earth's core, from the dictator Deimos while protecting a large piece of kryptonite from Metallo and Silver Banshee. While Silver Banshee gets away following Deimos' defeat, Green Lantern questions why Metallo needed so much kryptonite, but Metallo is short-circuited by the Secret Society before he can divulge any details to the League. After closing up the entrance to Skartaris, Green Lantern plans to have Martian Manhunter probe Metallo's mind.
30	4	"To Another Shore"	Dan Riba	Dwayne McDuffie	September 24, 2005	N/A
As J'onn has been feeling more alone in the tower, Wonder Woman is busy at a United Nations conference on change in the world, when the icy location goes under attack by the Secret Society members Giganta, Killer Frost, and Heat Wave. She is tasked with protecting the body of the Viking Prince from members of the Secret Society who want to reverse engineer invulnerability powers from it. Troubled by his isolation, Martian Manhunter leaves the Justice League to better understand humanity.
31	5	"Flash and Substance"	Joaquim Dos Santos	Matt Wayne	February 11, 2006	N/A
Orion attempts to understand Flash's antics as Wally and Batman battle four of Flash's Rogues like Captain Boomerang, Captain Cold, Mirror Master, and Trickster who attack the opening of the Flash Museum. Note: This episode includes many references to Flash's comic book and television history, including a guest appearance by Linda Park, and brings back Mark Hamill as the Trickster.
32	6	"Dead Reckoning"	Dan Riba	Dwayne McDuffie	February 18, 2006	N/A
Under the advice of the deity Rama Kushna, Deadman convinces Superman, Batman, and Wonder Woman to help him retrieve the souls of a mystic order of monks, stolen by the Secret Society. They force the Secret Society to retreat from Gorilla City, ending Grodd's attempt to turn all people on Earth into apes. Deadman, possessing Batman, accidentally kills Devil Ray, who was attacking Wonder Woman. Rama Kushna states to Deadman that the scales are now unbalanced and he must continue his duties. At a meeting in the Secret Society's HQ, Lex Luthor states that Grodd's master plan was silly and shoots him, assuming leadership of the Secret Society.
33	7	"Patriot Act"	Joaquim Dos Santos	Matt Wayne	February 25, 2006	N/A
General Eiling steals the Captain Nazi super-soldier serum and injects it into himself to "protect" the world from the Justice League. With most of the League busy, Green Arrow leads Stargirl, S.T.R.I.P.E., Shining Knight, Crimson Avenger, Vigilante, and Speedy against him when he attacks a parade they were hosting. During the battle a civilian points out the hypocrisy of Eiling's actions: his goal was to rid the world of metahumans, but he was the only one in the fight who actually had superpowers. Persuaded by that logic, Eiling retreats from the battle. Note: The sub-team in this episode is an homage to the Golden Age Seven Soldiers of Victory.
34	8	"The Great Brain Robbery"	Dan Riba	Story by : Dwayne McDuffie; Teleplay by : Matt Wayne	March 4, 2006	N/A
Trying to learn more about the Secret Society, magic and science accidentally collide swapping the minds of Lex Luthor and Flash. The Justice League attempts to contain a super-speed powered Luthor on the Watchtower, while Flash tries to hide the change from the Secret Society. Lex learns of Flash's identity, but it is of no use to him. Flash also allows the League to learn about Lex's new plan for the society and learn about the scale of their operations. Note: Lex Luthor's dialogue and manner of speaking in Flash's body is a nod to Flash's voice actor Michael Rosenbaum, who also portrayed Luthor in the live-action show Smallville.
35	9	"Grudge Match"	Joaquim Dos Santos	Story by : Matt Wayne; Teleplay by : J. M. DeMatteis	March 11, 2006	N/A
Needing money for the Secret Society to search for Brainiac, Lex tasks Roulette with restarting Metabrawl, this time with an all-female fight card called "Glamour-Slam", made up of mind-controlled Justice League members. First, Huntress and Black Canary are set against Vixen and Hawkgirl, and then the four must contend against Wonder Woman. They ultimately are able to break out of their mind control through inflicting pain on each other and scare away the audience and capture Roulette and Sonar. However, they do not learn anything about who she works for. Note: The story takes place in the city of Blüdhaven, with Nightwing making a cameo appearance.
36	10	"Far from Home"	Dan Riba	Story by : Dwayne McDuffie; Teleplay by : Paul Dini	April 15, 2006	N/A
Supergirl, Green Lantern and Green Arrow are kidnapped and taken to the 31st century by Brainiac 5 and Bouncing Boy of the Legion of Super-Heroes. Here Supergirl embarks on her very last mission — a battle against the Fatal Five and the mind-controlled Legion. Supergirl and Brainiac 5 are forced to work together to save the Legion from the Fatal Five.
37	11	"Ancient History"	Joaquim Dos Santos	Story by : Matt Wayne; Teleplay by : Geoff Johns	April 29, 2006	
Green Lantern meets Hawkman when he helps to capture Gentleman Ghost. Later, Shadow Thief captures Green Lantern, Hawkgirl and Hawkman at a museum while incapacitating Vixen. Then he forces them to watch a vision of their past selves' lives in Egypt. Shadow Thief is shown to be a villain created from Carter Hall's mind who was released when he touched the Absorbacron. Shadow Thief shows John and Shayara that they are the reincarnations of Thanagarians named Chay-Ara and Bashari who crash-landed in Egypt millennia prior and were murdered by their servant Hath-Set. Hawkman then re-absorbs Shadow Thief, after which Green Lantern chooses to stay with Vixen. Later, Hawkgirl asks Batman to tell her more about her son.
38	12	"Alive!"	Dan Riba	Matt Wayne	May 6, 2006	N/A
Luthor and the Secret Society refit their headquarters and fly into deep space in an attempt to reconstitute Brainiac. En route, Tala frees Grodd, who leads other disaffected villains against Luthor and his supporters. Luthor uses his intellect and resourcefulness to counter his various adversaries' powers. Metron appears, warning Luthor not to go ahead with the experiment. Luthor then uses Tala's magic in an attempt to reconstitute Brainiac, but instead resurrects Darkseid, who plans to lay waste to Earth. Darkseid returns to Apokolips and stops a war between the Granny Goodness and Virman Vundabar's factions of his Elite fighting for power, and reveals to them his plans of an invasion of Earth. Luthor and the surviving Secret Society members turn to the Justice League for help.
39	13	"Destroyer"	Joaquim dos Santos	Dwayne McDuffie	May 13, 2006	N/A
The Justice League teams up with the surviving members of the Secret Society to repel Darkseid's invasion. As the League and Secret Society members battle the Apokolips fleet on the other side of the planet, Superman, Batman, and Lex Luthor take on Darkseid atop the Daily Planet building. J'onn returns now settled down with a wife. Lex is taken to the location of the Anti-Life Equation by Metron and is told it is the only way to stop Darkseid. Metron warns him only a high intellect could handle the knowledge, but Lex proceeds. He returns in his business suit and shows Darkseid the Equation, and they both disappear and are absorbed into the Source Wall. The Justice League gives the villains a five-minute head start before they attempt to take them in and the entire League begins the chase. NOTE: This episode marks the series finale of the series, also the final episode of the DC Animated Universe.
