= DC Universe: Legacies =

DC comics made in 2010

- Cover to issue #1, art by Andy Kubert and Joe Kubert.

Publication information
- Publisher: DC Comics
- Schedule: Monthly
- Format: Limited series
- Publication date: May 2010 – March 2011
- No. of issues: 10

Creative team
- Written by: Len Wein
- Artist(s): Andy Kubert (#1–2); Joe Kubert (#1–2); J. G. Jones (#1); J. H. Williams III (#2); Scott Kolins (#2–10); José Luis García-López (#3–4); Dave Gibbons (#3–4); Scott Koblish (#5); Walter Simonson (#5)> George Pérez (#5–6); Jerry Ordway (#6–8); Brian Bolland (#7); Dan Jurgens (#7–8); Bill Sienkiewicz (#9); Jesus Saiz (#9–10); Gary Frank (#10); Karl Story (#10)
- Pencillers: Tom Derenick; Scott Kolins; Jesus Saiz
- Inkers: Scott Kolins; Robin Riggs; Karl Story
- Letterer: Rob Leigh
- Colorists: Mike Atiyeh; Tom Chu

Collected editions
- Hardcover: ISBN 978-1-4012-3133-0
- Softcover: ISBN 1401231330

DC Universe: Legacies is a 2010–2011 ten-issue comic book limited series written by Len Wein and published by DC Comics. It details the perspective of an admirer of superheroes in the DC Universe from the Golden, Silver, Bronze, and Modern eras of comic books.

== Plot summary ==
Retiree Paul Lincoln recounts his following of superheroes through the past decades, narrating the story.

=== Issue 1: "In the Beginning..." ===
In the 1940s, Paul and his friend Jimmy live in Metropolis, collecting protection money in Suicide Slum. Paul happens upon strange mask-wearing crime-fighters taking down rival mobsters. The original Atom gives Paul a business card for shouting a warning, and Paul decides to get honest work. In hopes of convincing Jimmy, Paul shows him a magazine of the Justice Society of America (JSA).

=== Issue 2: "The Golden Age" ===
Punks try to collect protection money from Paul as a paperboy for the Globe-Leader, and he is saved by Guardian and the Newsboy Legion. He begins dating Jimmy's sister Peggy and works his way through college. Jimmy becomes a member of a local mob, the Injustice Gang of the World run by Vandal Savage, and goes on the run after the JSA takes the gang down. Ordered by the House Un-American Activities Committee to reveal their identities, the JSA refuse and disappear.

=== Issue 3: "Powers & Abilities!" ===
The next decade sees a resurgence of Wild Western culture and the appearance of adventure-type heroes such as the Challengers of the Unknown, Sea Devils, and Cave Carson. Paul becomes a police officer and, partnered with John Jones (secretly the Martian Manhunter), raids a warehouse where they arrest Jimmy. Despite this, Peggy and Paul are married. Years later, Paul witnesses Superman in action and the arrival of Batman, and names his daughter Diana as Wonder Woman makes her debut. More superheroes gather, forming the Justice League of America (JLA).

=== Issue 4: "The Next Generation!" ===
More heroes appear with a resurgence of sidekicks like Robin, Kid Flash, Aqualad, Wonder Girl, and Speedy, who form the Teen Titans, along with a rogues gallery of super-villains. The JSA comes out of retirement to team-up with the JLA. Paul speaks at parole hearings on behalf of Jimmy, who vows to reform. The Doom Patrol are apparently killed on national media by General Zahl while trying to save the village of Codsville.

=== Issue 5: "Crisis!" ===
Things turn darker as the Joker kills people and the Spectre exacts vengeance on even petty crimes. Jimmy is released and gets a job at S.T.A.R. Labs, confirming his reformation by evacuating the labs during a battle between Superman and Chemo. Batman resigns from the JLA and forms the Outsiders. Paul has Jimmy, his wife Helen, and their son Ted over for dinner when he is called to duty as the Crisis on Infinite Earths begins. He asks Jimmy to guard his family, then bears witness to the chaos of the Crisis as heroes from all eras try to help.

=== Issue 6: "Aftermath!" ===
While rescuing the wounded, Paul is helped by the Guardian, who secretly congratulates Paul on the man he has become. Paul sees the Anti-Monitor while the heroes converge for a showdown. Jimmy is crippled in the disaster. After a period of rebuilding, Brimstone attacks Metropolis; Paul is saved by the JLA, who are then defeated by Brimstone. Brimstone is later defeated by the Suicide Squad, a team of heroes and coerced villains. The JLA disband as the U.S. president outlaws superheroes in public. Gordon Godfrey attempts to overthrow the government, but is stopped by heroes gathered by Doctor Fate. The victors form the Justice League International (JLI). Shortly after, Paul is promoted to detective, and the Joker shoots and cripples Barbara Gordon.

=== Issue 7: "Doomsday!" ===
In Gotham, Bane breaks Batman and tosses him over a roof. Vigilante Azrael takes his place and eventually defeats Bane, leaving him for the police. Meanwhile, the alien monster Doomsday emerges in the U.S. Midwest, takes down the Justice League, and is fought by Superman in Metropolis, where both are apparently killed. Peggy is diagnosed with cancer, but has a chance as it was detected early.

=== Issue 8: "Parallel Lives!" ===
Batman stops Azrael's brutality under his identity. Following the death of Superman, four figures claim to be Superman reborn: Superboy, Steel, Cyborg Superman, and the Eradicator. One of them may be responsible for the theft of an extraterrestrial exo-suit which Paul is investigating. Eradicator tries to stop Mongul's spaceship but is attacked by Cyborg Superman. The true Superman returns and, along with Steel and Superboy, sets out to destroy the War World being created from Mongul's ship. Cyborg Superman is defeated. Peggy responds to her cancer treatment, and Diana graduates high school intending to become an oncologist. Green Lantern attacks his own Green Lantern Corps and the Guardians of the Universe after Mongul and Cyborg Superman destroy his hometown of Coast City, absorbing the Central Power Battery and becoming Parallax.

=== Issue 9: "Knight After Knight" ===
Green Lantern goes rogue, causing death and destruction, then vanishes. Peggy's cancer is in remission when they learn of a battle between the new Green Lantern and Major Force. An alien named Dusk arrives in Metropolis, warning of the arrival of the Sun-Eater and urging to evacuate the planet. Paul, Peggy and Diana gather, and watch news reports as the heroes try to stop the Final Night. Parallax returns and saves Earth, sacrificing his life to re-ignite the Sun.

Jimmy is in rehab to walk again when Paul asks him about the missing exo-suit stolen from S.T.A.R. Labs. Paul follows another lead when the events of Day of Judgment occur. The reformed JLA and the Sentinels of Magic bring back the soul of Green Lantern, who bonds with Spectre and drives Asmodel out. Green Lantern vows to change Spectre's mission from vengeance to redemption.

=== Issue 10: "Truth and Consequences" ===
While Paul is coming to terms with Peggy's spreading, late-stage cancer, the superhero community is searching for Sue Dibny's killer. It turns out to be Jean Loring, who had been trying to win back her ex-husband, the Atom (Ray Palmer). The man who stole the exo-suit attempts to commit a bank robber as Armory, which is stopped by Superman. Paul and Diana attend Peggy's bedside as she dies. Citizens are secretly transformed into OMACs, and Paul's partner transforms and rampages in S.T.A.R. Labs. Jimmy uses the returned exo-suit to battle OMAC, saving Paul's life at the cost of his own.

Paul is cut short from telling the rest of his story by a nurse who sets him to sleep in the nursing home.

== Co-features ==
1. 'Reflection' – A reporter and a photographer are getting the story about Doctor Fate, the Spectre, and Zatara, while trying to figure out whether magic are fact or fiction.
2. 'Reaction' – The Dummy challenges the Seven Soldiers of Victory: Vigilante, TNT and Dan the Dyna-Mite, Shining Knight, Stripesy and Star-Spangled Kid, Crimson Avenger, and Wing.
3. 'Resurgence' – The Challengers of the Unknown, Sea Devils, and Cave Carson team-up against the Volcano Man.
4. 'Remembrance' – Jeb Stuart of the Haunted Tank, the Losers, Gravedigger, Mademoiselle Marie, and the Unknown Soldier attends a reunion in the 1970s where they celebrate the fallen soldier, Sgt. Rock, who had died in World War II.
5. 'Resistance' – Adam Strange teams-up with fellow space adventurers Tommy Tomorrow, Captain Comet, and Space Ranger.
6. 'Revision' – A young Clark Kent is approached by the Legion of Super-Heroes to join their team, but versions of the Legion from multiple points further in the future arrive, asking Clark for his help. A fight breaks out as to which Legion will recruit Clark first. Clark rebukes the multiple Legions, returning his Legion flight ring. He notes that the ring means something special to each Legionnaire, and requests that the Legionnaires return when they can tell him what that special thing is.
7. 'Reunion' – The Atom (Ray Palmer) helps Professor Hyatt with his invention, the time pool, and a mystery gold coin dating to the Arthurian period. The Atom enters the time pool, where he witnesses King Arthur, Shining Knight, Silent Knight, Merlin, and Etrigan the Demon battle Morgaine le Fey and her demonic knights.
8. 'Revelation' – A dairy woman and others who had been kidnapped by the forces of Apokolips are rescued by the New Genesis hero Orion, who explains his story about the New Gods.
9. 'Resurrection' – The wizard Shazam tells the story of Captain Marvel, the Marvel Family, and Black Adam.
10. 'Redemption' – The legacy of the Blue Beetle in his last moments before his death in Countdown to Infinite Crisis.

== See also ==
- Marvels – a similarly themed limited-series comic examining the Marvel Universe.
