= Shining Knight =

Name of multiple superheroes

Shining Knight (Welsh: Marchog Disglair; Breton: Marc'heg Lugernus) is the name of multiple superheroes appearing in American comic books published by DC Comics. The original version was created by Creig Flessel and first appeared in Adventure Comics #66 (September 1941).

== Fictional character biography ==
=== Sir Justin ===
The original Shining Knight (Sir Justin) debuted during the Golden Age and Modern Age of Comic Books and is a founding member of the Seven Soldiers of Victory.

=== Gardner Grayle ===
A new version of the Seven Soldiers of Victory was introduced in the storyline "Silver Age". This iteration of the group was established to combat the Injustice League, who had possessed the bodies of the Justice League of America.

Gardner Grayle, who would later become the Atomic Knight, took an experimental suit of armor and called himself Shining Knight for this one mission. This version of the Seven Soldiers with Batgirl, Deadman, Metamorpho, Blackhawk, Adam Strange and Mento only served in one mission and the Shining Knight armor was destroyed.

=== Ystina ===
Ystina is a reimagined version of the original Shining Knight. He was created by Grant Morrison for the series Seven Soldiers.

=== Sigfried ===
Wonder Woman's one-time love interest Sigurðr, named for the Norse character of the same name, also known as "Sigfried" or "Siggy", was introduced in Wonder Woman #770 (2021) by writers Michael W. Conrad and Becky Cloonan. He is a Norse einherjar warrior who befriended Wonder Woman when she was trapped in Valhalla following her death, and gifted her his magical sword Gram. Sigurðr was resurrected in Wonder Woman #784 as the Shining Knight under the control of Doctor Psycho, before his memories and sanity are restored to him.

== Other versions ==
=== Kingdom Come ===
An original incarnation of Shining Knight appears in Kingdom Come. This version possesses a futuristic appearance and is accompanied by Dragonknight, a robotic dragon.

=== Titans Tomorrow ===
An older version of Ystina appears in Teen Titans (vol. 3) #52 as a member of the Titans Army from the Titans Tomorrow future.

=== JLA: Another Nail ===
An unidentified version of Shining Knight appears in JLA: Another Nail.

== In other media ==
- Sir Justin appears in Justice League Unlimited, voiced by Chris Cox.
- Gardner Grayle appears in Black Lightning, portrayed by Boone Platt.
- Sir Justin appears in Stargirl, portrayed by Mark Ashworth.
