= Seven Soldiers of Victory =

Team of comic book superheroes

- The original Seven Soldiers.

Publication information
- Publisher: DC Comics
- First appearance: Leading Comics #1 (Winter 1941)
- Created by: Mort Weisinger (writer); Mort Meskin

In-story information
- Member(s): See members

The Seven Soldiers of Victory (also known as Law's Legionnaires) are a team of superheroes appearing in American comic books published by DC Comics. They first appeared in Leading Comics #1 (Winter 1941), and were created by Mort Weisinger and Mort Meskin. The team was a short-lived assembly of some of the less famous superheroes in the DC Universe who have made occasional appearances since their Golden Age debut.

== Fictional team history ==
=== Pre-Crisis ===
The Seven Soldiers of Victory (also known as the Law's Legionnaires) is DC Comics' second super-hero team, following the Justice Society of America. Like the Justice Society, the membership of the Seven Soldiers is drawn from DC's anthology comics: Vigilante (from Action Comics); Crimson Avenger (from Detective Comics); Green Arrow and Speedy (from More Fun Comics); Shining Knight (from Adventure Comics); and Star-Spangled Kid and Stripesy (from Star-Spangled Comics).

Unlike most superhero teams, the Seven Soldiers include two sidekicks, Speedy and Stripesy, as members (Stripesy is a rarity, an adult sidekick to a "kid" lead character). Crimson Avenger's sidekick Wing also takes part in the team's adventures, and is in every other way an "eighth Soldier", but is never considered an "official" member. All of the group's members are non-powered humans who rely on conventional weapons or training in place of superhuman abilities.

The team is formed when the criminal mastermind called the Hand (later the Iron Hand), believing himself terminally ill, gives his greatest unused schemes to five other supercriminals who he saved from the police (Big Caesar, Dummy, Needle, Professor Merlin, and Red Dragon) to commit crimes across the U.S. as "the Hand's Five Fingers" and prove his genius to the world. The Hand also challenges the five criminals' enemies (Crimson Avenger, the Vigilante, the Star-Spangled Kid and Stripesy, Green Arrow and Speedy and Shining Knight, respectively) to stop the criminals, presuming they will fail. However, the heroes defeat the Hand's Five Fingers. The heroes converge on the Hand's base after he reveals his whereabouts; the villain had found out a cure for his condition and decides to eliminate the heroes so he can remain free, but the heroes evade his traps. When the villain tries to use a lightning ray machine against them, the Vigilante shoots a crucial component of the device, bringing machinery down upon the Hand and apparently killing him. Deciding they work well together, the heroes form the Seven Soldiers of Victory.

The Seven Soldiers of Victory appear in the first 14 issues of Leading Comics (which changed to an all-humor format in #15).

A script by Joseph Samachson from the 1940s, in which the elf-like Willie Wisher banishes the Soldiers to "the Land of Magic", where they encounter various supernatural characters, was later serialized in 1975 in Adventure Comics #438–443, with each chapter illustrated by a different artist (including Dick Dillin, Howard Chaykin, Lee Elias, Mike Grell, Ernie Chan, and José Luis García-López).

==== Return ====
The team is resurrected in Justice League of America #100–102. During the celebration of their 100th meeting, the JLA is brought to Earth-Two by the Justice Society of America, where a giant ethereal hand controlled by the Iron Hand (who turned up alive) threatens to destroy their world unless he is given control over it. Having been unable to destroy the hand themselves, the only clue the JSA could find was a mystical vision of a grave for "the Unknown Soldier of Victory". An unearthly Oracle, summoned by Doctor Fate, Zatanna, and Thunderbolt, reveals to the JLA and the JSA that the Seven Soldiers had fought and destroyed a similar menace called Nebula Man many years previously, though at the seeming cost of their existences. The Oracle then explains that the Soldiers had instead been scattered throughout history. The two teams split into smaller groups and are sent back in time by the Oracle to find them.

Doctor Fate, the Atom, and the Elongated Man find Crimson Avenger in Mexico, where he believes he is the Aztec sun god. Superman, Sandman, and Metamorpho rescue the amnesiac Shining Knight from the hordes of Genghis Khan. Hawkman, Doctor Mid-Nite, and the Golden Age Wonder Woman find the Golden Age Green Arrow in medieval England, where he had been mistaken for Robin Hood. Batman, Hourman, and Starman retrieve Stripesy from ancient Egypt.

The Silver Age Green Arrow, Black Canary, Johnny Thunder, and Thunderbolt save the Vigilante from a tribe of Indians in the Old West. Aquaman, Wildcat, and Green Lantern rescue the Star-Spangled Kid from 50,000 years in the past. Zatanna, the Silver Age Flash and Red Tornado free Speedy from ancient Greece, where he had been transformed into a centaur by Circe. The Golden Age Green Lantern, Mister Terrific and the Golden Age Robin go on a quest to discover the identity of the Unknown Soldier of Victory, whose tomb lay in the mountains of Tibet where the Seven Soldiers had fallen after defeating the Nebula Man. The Seven Soldiers are reunited, but Earth-1 and Diana Prince had been attacked by the Iron Hand. She is able to overcome him, but he is no longer able to stop the giant hand. The heroes create a new Nebula Rod to deal with the giant hand, but whoever uses the Nebula Rod is certain to perish (as did Crimson Avenger's partner Wing, revealed to be the Unknown Soldier of Victory, when the Nebula Man was stopped). While the heroes argue over who will make the sacrifice, the android Red Tornado takes the Nebula Rod and destroys the Hand, destroying himself in the process.

The only other modern meeting of the team (either in pre- or post-Crisis continuity) takes place in Infinity, Inc. #11, in which the Vigilante, Shining Knight, Green Arrow, Speedy and the Star-Spangled Kid gather at the grave of Crimson Avenger. He had died two years earlier saving Gotham City from a boatload of explosives in DC Comics Presents #38.

=== Post-Crisis ===
==== First team ====
In the original post-Crisis retcon of the team, both Wing and the Vigilante's sidekick Stuff the Chinatown Kid are promoted to full membership, to replace the Golden Age Green Arrow and Speedy, who had been removed from active continuity. Stuff had never appeared with the team during the original Leading Comics run, while an older man named Billy Gunn helped out the Vigilante on his cases in the comic.

This retcon is changed in the late nineties, in Stars and S.T.R.I.P.E. #9. While Stuff remains a full member, Wing is not an official Soldier because his mentor Crimson Avenger wants him to do something more important with his life. The remaining spot on the team is filled by the Spider, an archer who had originally appeared in Quality Comics' Crack Comics. This Spider is a villain and has been working with the team's archenemy the Hand, creator of the original Nebula Man. Spider sabotages the Nebula Rod, and sends the team to fight a fruitless battle. The villain tries to kill Wing, but he escapes and reaches the other Soldiers. They repair the Nebula Rod and use it to destroy the Nebula Man. Wing dies and his teammates are again tossed through time and later retrieved by the JLA and JSA. The only major difference between this story and the 1972 story is that this time the Vigilante is found after he had spent nearly 20 years fighting crime in the Old West. In the 2010 series DC Universe: Legacies, TNT and Dyna-Mite are retroactively established to have been part of the Seven Soldiers.

==== Second team ====
Another group takes the name of the Seven Soldiers of Victory in the Showcase issue of the miniseries known as Silver Age. This group, brought together to help the Justice League of America and the other major heroes and teams of the 1960s to battle the menace of Agamemno, consists of Adam Strange, Batgirl, Blackhawk, Deadman, Mento, Metamorpho, and a new Shining Knight. This group's Shining Knight is Gardner Grayle from the Silver Age feature The Atomic Knights; in previously published stories that occurred after the Silver Age limited series, he becomes the Atomic Knight and joins the Outsiders. This is the only appearance of this particular assemblage.

=== Seven Soldiers ===
Seven Soldiers is a comic book metaseries written by Grant Morrison and published by DC Comics. It was published as seven interrelated mini-series and two bookend issues. The series features a new version of the Seven Soldiers of Victory fighting to save Earth from the Sheeda.

The series was bookended by Seven Soldiers #0 and #1, with art by J. H. Williams III. The rest was made up of seven mini-series: Shining Knight with art by Simone Bianchi, Manhattan Guardian with art by Cameron Stewart, Zatanna with art by Ryan Sook, Klarion with art by Frazer Irving, Mister Miracle with art by Pascal Ferry, Bulleteer with art by Yanick Paquette, and Frankenstein with art by Doug Mahnke.

=== The New Golden Age ===
In "The New Golden Age", the Seven Soldiers of Victory reunite upon being summoned by Jill Carlyle. While Carlyle takes the adults on a mission, Stargirl and Red Arrow find out that they are going after Clock King. They find the Seven Soldiers of Victory fighting Clock King on a ship where the original Crimson Avenger (Lee Travis) had died. Before Stargirl destroys Per Degaton's time machine that sends the ship back to its own time, Crimson Avenger tells her to find Wing. Once time is fixed, history is changed so that Travis' body was found.

=== Halo Corporation ===
The re-integration of the Wildstorm characters into the DCU saw a relaunch of the Wildcats title. In issue #2-3, Jacob Marlowe unveils a version of the Seven Soldiers of Victory that will serve as a public 'face' and PR cover for the covert actions of the Wildcats team. This team consists of Threshold (formerly of Dv8), Majestic, Andromache, Maul, Mother One, Agent Wax, and Pike.

== Members ==
=== Pre-Crisis ===
- Crimson Avenger (Lee Travis)
- Star-Spangled Kid (Sylvester Pemberton)
- Stripesy (Pat Dugan)
- Vigilante (Greg Saunders)
- Shining Knight (Sir Justin)
- Green Arrow (Oliver Queen)
- Speedy (Roy Harper)
- Wing as "unofficial eighth soldier"

=== Post-Crisis first team ===
- Crimson Avenger (Lee Travis)
- Star-Spangled Kid (Sylvester Pemberton)
- Stripesy (Pat Dugan)
- Vigilante (Greg Saunders)
- Stuff the Chinatown Kid (Victor Leong, Vigilante's sidekick)
- Shining Knight (Sir Justin)
- TNT (Thomas N. Thomas)
- Dyna-Mite (Daniel Dunbar)
- Spider (Tom Holloway/Thomas Ludlow)
- Wing as "unofficial eighth soldier"
- The Squire (Percy Sheldrake), later Knight accompanied them on one mission.

=== Post-Crisis second team ===
- Batgirl (Barbara Gordon)
- Blackhawk (Janos Prohaska)
- Metamorpho (Rex Mason)
- Mento (Steve Dayton)
- Deadman (Boston Brand)
- Adam Strange
- Shining Knight (Gardner Grayle)

== Enemies ==
Notable enemies in order of appearance include:

- Iron Hand - Ramon Solomano is a master criminal.
- Big Caesar - An enemy of Crimson Avenger who allies with Iron Hand.
- The Dummy - A villain who dresses like a ventriloquist's dummy and an enemy of Vigilante who allies with Iron Hand. In a reversal of Doome's tactics, Dummy later uses a time machine to send the Soldiers into the past.
- Needle - An enemy of Star-Spangled Kid who allies with Iron Hand.
- Professor Merlin - A mad scientist and enemy of Green Arrow who allies with Iron Hand.
- Red Dragon - An enemy of Shining Knight who allies with Iron Hand.
- Black Star - A villain who uses "black light" to transform himself into a giant.
  - Brain - A minion of Black Star who fights Crimson Avenger.
  - Captain Bigg - A scientist, modern day pirate, and minion of Black Star who fights Star-Spangled Kid.
  - False-Face - A master of disguise and minion of Black Star who fights Shining Knight.
  - Hopper - A minion of Black Star who uses a special pogo stick and fights Green Arrow.
  - Rattler - A minion of Black Star who fights Vigilante.
- Dr. Wilfred Doome - A scientist who uses a time machine to summon historic tyrants as his operatives, including Alexander the Great, Attila the Hun, Genghis Khan, Napoleon Bonaparte, and Nero.
- The Sixth Senses - A group of criminals that are after pieces of a "lifestone".
  - Sixth Sense - Brett is the leader of the Six Senses who attempts to assemble a "lifestone" to animate an army of stone.
  - Bloodhound - A member of the Sixth Senses with an enhanced sense of smell.
  - Eagle Eye - A member of the Sixth Senses.
  - Fingers - A member of the Sixth Senses.
  - Leo Palate - A member of the Sixth Senses.
  - Mickey Gordon - A member of the Sixth Senses.
- Skull - A wealthy man who pays criminals to steal an experimental age-reversing device. He died when he stepped into the machine and aged to an old man.
- Copperhead - Francisco Pizarro is a criminal who briefly turns the Soldiers against each other during an Andes treasure hunt.
- Wizards of Stanovia - A group of wizards who suppress democracy.
- Mr. X - A master of disguise who wagers with several of the heroes' individual enemies that he can defeat the entire team.
- Baby-Face Johnson - A gangster and the self-proclaimed "King of the Hundred Isles".
- Barracuda - A criminal who seeks powerful artifacts used by earlier criminals.

== In other media ==
- The Seven Soldiers of Victory appear in the Justice League Unlimited episode, "Patriot Act," consisting of Green Arrow, Vigilante, Shining Knight, Stargirl, S.T.R.I.P.E., Crimson Avenger, and Speedy.
- The Seven Soldiers of Victory appear in Stargirl, consisting of the Star-Spangled Kid, Stripesy, Green Arrow, Speedy, Vigilante, Shining Knight, Crimson Avenger, and Wing. This version of the group operated years before the Justice Society of America.

== Collected editions ==
The original appearances have been collected as part of the DC Archive Editions:

- The Seven Soldiers of Victory Archives
  - Volume 1 collects Leading Comics #1–4, 240 pages, March 2005 ISBN 978-1401204013
  - Volume 2 collects Leading Comics #5–8, 228 pages, July 2007 ISBN 978-1401213084
  - Volume 3 collects Leading Comics #9–14 & a script for #15, 288 pages, July 2008 ISBN 978-1401216948
