= Shining Knight (Sir Justin) =

- Shining Knight and Winged Victory, from the cover of All-Star Squadron #62 (October 1986); art by Mike Harris and Tony DeZuniga.

Publication information
- Publisher: DC Comics
- First appearance: Adventure Comics #66 (September 1941)
- Created by: Creig Flessel (writer/artist)

In-story information
- Alter ego: Sir Justin
- Team affiliations: Knights of the Round Table; Justice Society of America; Seven Soldiers of Victory; All-Star Squadron; Justice League
- Partnerships: Vigilante
- Notable aliases: Justin Arthur
- Abilities: Superhuman physical abilities; Enchanted physiology; Slowed aging; Great Resistance to poison; Suspended animation in case of freezing; Skilled swordsman and strategist; Master of martial arts and superb hand-to-hand fighter; Indomitable will; Leadership

Shining Knight (Sir Justin) is a fictional superhero appearing in American comic books published by DC Comics, the first of several to use the name Shining Knight. He was created by Creig Flessel and first appeared in Adventure Comics #66 (September 1941). He appeared regularly until issue #125, and off and on until issue #166.

The character appeared on the Justice League Unlimited animated series and the Stargirl live-action series, voiced by Chris Cox in the former and portrayed by Mark Ashworth in the latter.

== Fictional character biography ==
Sir Justin, the newest member of the Knights of the Round Table in King Arthur's court, is one of many knights who witnesses the death of Queen Guinevere's cousin, Sir Fallon. While searching for Fallon's killer, the ogre Blunderbore, Sir Justin frees the wizard Merlin from a tree. In gratitude, Merlin blesses Sir Justin with his magic, enchanting his body in a superhuman being, turning the impoverished knight's rusty weapons and armor into brilliant enchanted armaments and transforming his horse Victory into a winged horse.

Sir Justin later battles and kills Blunderbore. Before dying, the ogre triggers an avalanche that buries Justin and Winged Victory. Kept alive for hundreds of years by the magic that empowered them, the two are freed in the Modern age by a museum curator during an archeological dig. Sir Justin decides to combat evil with his magic powers and skills as a knight, called by everybody the Shining Knight and taking the surname Arthur. He eventually met heroes like Crimson Avenger and Vigilante and, after meeting other heroes, they formed the Seven Soldiers of Victory. Later, Sir Justin returns to Britain and becomes a bodyguard to its prime minister. During his career as a superhero, he meets a boy who looks up to him and vows to be his sidekick for a brief time, taking the name Squire.

Shining Knight also has a relationship with the second Firebrand, who is apparently killed by the Dragon King. In the last battle with his teammates in the Seven Soldiers of Victory, they battle a powerful energy creature called Nebula Man. In the process, he is displaced in time, loses his memories, and becomes a janitor at Blue Valley High School until his memories return. With his memories finally returned, Sir Justin comes back as the Shining Knight stronger than before. Finally, the Shining Knight fights and defeats Dragon King and his evil allies, avenging Firebrand.

In Identity Crisis, Shining Knight assists Captain Marvel, Vixen and Firestorm during their battle with Shadow Thief, during which the villain steals his sword and uses it to kill Firestorm. Shining Knight vows revenge on the villain, eventually managing to regain the sword with Merlin's help.

In "The New Golden Age", Shining Knight (alongside Winged Victory) reunites with the Seven Soldiers of Victory members, who meet up with Crimson Avenger. He assists his fellow Seven Soldiers of Victory in fighting Clock King, who was using Per Degaton's time machine on the displaced shipwreck that the original Crimson Avenger died on.

== Powers and abilities ==
Shining Knight is a master of the arts of combat of Arthurian times, skilled in aerial combat, weaponry including art of sword, and hand-to-hand combat. In some comics, it is revealed that Shining Knight has superhuman physical abilities, including: strength, stamina, endurance, speed, reflexes, balance and agility. He has one good restance to mortal poisons, Due to the suspended resuscitation by an iceberg, Sir Justin's aging has slowed down considerably, remaining forever young. He has an indomitable will; even though there are enemies that are much stronger than him, the Shining Knight refuses to give up and continues to fight. Sir Justin show to having a good control to animals

=== Equipment ===
Shining Knight possesses enchanted armor, which protects him from any harm, and an enchanted sword that can cut through anything except for Shining Knight's enchanted armor, and is capable of repelling, absorbing, and shooting magical attacks.

When Merlin transformed Sir Justin's horse Victory into the winged horse Winged Victory, he became Shining Knight's mode of transportation.

== Other versions ==
Shining Knight and Winged Victory make cameo appearances in JLA: Another Nail.

== In other media ==
=== Television ===
Vigilante and Shining Knight respectively as they appeared in Justice League Unlimited.

- Shining Knight appears in Justice League Unlimited, voiced by Chris Cox. This version is a member of the Justice League.
- Shining Knight appears in Stargirl, portrayed by Mark Ashworth. This version was a member of the Seven Soldiers of Victory and mentor to Pat Dugan. After the Soldiers disbanded, Sir Justin became an independent superhero and attempted to foil the Injustice Society of America's (ISA) plans, only to be defeated and brainwashed by ISA member Dragon King into believing he was a lowly janitor at Blue Valley High School. In the present, Sir Justin regains his memories with Dugan's help and helps him and the Justice Society of America defeat the ISA before leaving in hopes of finding the other surviving former Soldiers and Winged Victory.

=== Video games ===
Shining Knight and Winged Victory appear as character summons in Scribblenauts Unmasked: A DC Comics Adventure.
