= Atomic Knight =

Atomic Knight is a superhero appearing in American comic books published by DC Comics, and was briefly a member of the Outsiders team. He is sometimes depicted as one of a group of Atomic Knights, which first appeared in Strange Adventures #117 (June 1960) and ran quarterly in that monthly comic up through #160 (January 1964). The character was created by John Broome and Murphy Anderson.

Sergeant Gardner Grayle was portrayed by Boone Platt in the live action Arrowverse series Black Lightning in the third season.

== Development ==
During an interview, co-creator John Broome discussed the genesis for the idea. "I remember, in the beginning, we both got the feeling that it had something to do with King Arthur and the Knights of the Round Table. We thought if we could make a modern version of that spirit and the feeling, that would be a new kind of comic that hadn't been done and we would enjoy doing it. So we worked out a third World War where life was almost destroyed and crime was all over. And the Atomic Knights stand for justice and faith and all that. So that is the way the story began."

== The original Atomic Knights ==
The only Atomic Knights cover appearance in Strange Adventures #144. The giant Dalmatians are also present on the cover.

The Atomic Knights appeared in every third issue of Strange Adventures in the early 1960s, beginning with #117 (June 1960) and running through #160 (January 1964). In all there were 15 early-1960s Atomic Knights stories created by writer John Broome and artist Murphy Anderson; they were a band of heroes living in and protecting the post-apocalyptic future of 1992.

Following the catastrophic Hydrogen War of 1986, a petty tyrant named the Black Baron ruled a small section of the Midwestern United States with an iron fist. He was opposed by Sgt. Gardner Grayle and the Atomic Knights, who wore energy-resistant armor. The other Knights were twins Wayne and Hollis Hobard, Bryndon Smith, the last scientist left on Earth, and brother and sister Douglas and Marene Herald. The group became a symbol of hope to the survivors of the cataclysm.

The Atomic Knights, mid-70s incarnation.

The 15 Atomic Knights stories in Strange Adventures took place in "real time" (three months usually passed between the events of each story as well as in the real world) and generally dealt with post-holocaust recovery, as the Knights would fend off menaces and attempt to rebuild the area around their home base of Durvale, though they also managed to travel to Los Angeles, Detroit, New Orleans, New York, and Washington, D.C.

The Atomic Knights concept then laid dormant for more than a decade, until Cary Bates used the Knights as guest-stars in the mid-1970s series Hercules Unbound, beginning with #10 (April–May 1977). It was then revealed that Hercules, Kamandi, and the Atomic Knights all inhabited the same comics universe. Crisis on Infinite Earths: Absolute Edition had two Great Disaster realities: Earth-86 (where the Great Disaster that led to Kamandi's future was an atomic war) and Earth-295 (where the Great Disaster was natural). Since the Great Disaster on Earth-295 was natural, that reality had no Atomic Knights.

The Great Disaster has since been declared to be out-of-continuity in the current DC Universe, although one of the Post-52 alternate Earths (Earth-17) does feature the world of the Great Disaster. DC Comics Presents #57 attempted to retcon the Atomic Knights by 'revealing' them to be the dream of Gardner Grayle in a state of suspended animation (during which dream Superman attempts to prevent Grayle from causing a nuclear war). This story is not held to be canon in terms of the Earth of the Great Disaster, and little reference has been made to it after publication.

The 15 Atomic Knights stories were reprinted in Strange Adventures #217-231. In 2010 they were collected into a single DC hardcover volume; their appearances in Hercules Unbound and DC Comics Presents had not been reprinted until a 2014 volume entitled Showcase Presents The Great Disaster Featuring the Atomic Knights.

== Fictional character biography ==
=== Gardner Grayle ===
Atomic Knight
- Atomic Knight Gardner Grayle.

Publication information
- Publisher: DC Comics
- First appearance: Strange Adventures #117 (June 1960)
- Created by: John Broome; Murphy Anderson

In-story information
- Alter ego: Gardner Grayle
- Team affiliations: Atomic Knights; Outsiders; Forgotten Heroes; Seven Soldiers of Victory
- Notable aliases: Shining Knight
- Abilities: Precognition; Wears a suit of armor granting enhanced strength, speed, endurance and blasts of energy, as well as being adaptable to other technology

On Earth-One, Gardner Grayle was a sergeant in the army. His platoon was the infamous Platoon 13 and its symbol was a knight. Feverishly opposed to nuclear war, Grayle volunteered for a virtual reality experiment to see how people would react to a post-atomic war world. Within this experiment, Grayle believed that the adventures of the Atomic Knights were only a dream. After emerging from the experiment, Grayle donned a S.T.A.R. Labs battle suit and declared himself a modern knight in shining armor, briefly becoming the second Shining Knight and serving with the Seven Soldiers of Victory.

After a mildly successful career as a superhero, Grayle took a job at S.T.A.R. Labs. When he received a premonition from the goddess Cassandra, Grayle used his new technical know-how to build his atomic armor. He then participated in Crisis on Infinite Earths as one of the Forgotten Heroes who contacted Darkseid to enlist his help against the Anti-Monitor.

Afterward, he appeared in Outsiders (vol. 1), a team he joined and stayed with until its disbanding. The Outsiders would later reform (in vol. 2) but were considered fugitives after being framed for the slaughter of a Markovian village. At first, he hunted the team down but was convinced of their innocence and helped clear their name. He also helps the Outsiders battle a vampiric infestation in Abyssia. With the Outsiders, he also fell in love with fellow Outsider Windfall and they were seen together at Geo-Force's wedding.

The Atomic Knights from Battle for Bludhaven #6, art by Dan Jurgens and Jim Palmiotti.

In the series The Battle for Blüdhaven, Gardner Grayle is the leader of an underground band of new Atomic Knights operating within the destroyed city of Blüdhaven. There are roughly 125 Atomic Knights, with the main Knights being Grayle, Marene and Doug Herald, Bryndon, and Wayne and Hollis Hobard. The Atomic Knights wield armor with numerous powers including the ability to record and analyze complex data and fire powerful ballistic and nuclear blasts. At the end of the series, Captain Atom obliterates the remains of Blüdhaven, making way for the departure of S.H.A.D.E. operatives. After this, the Knights are seen entering an underground environment through a bunker named Command-D.

In Final Crisis, the Knights accompany Wonder Woman into the city, where Mary Marvel attacks and kills Marene Herald. The rest of the Atomic Knights are killed by Darkseid's forces.

== Powers and abilities ==
Gardner Grayle has precognition.

=== Equipment ===
Gardner Grayle wears a suit of armor that grants him enhanced strength, speed, endurance and blasts of energy, as well as being adaptable to other technology.

== Other versions ==
Atomic Knights from 52 Week 52, artist Justiniano.

- An alternate universe version of Atomic Knight from Earth-17 appears in 52. Earth-17 is a setting similar to, yet distinct from, the original depiction of the Atomic Knights.
- An alternate universe version of Atomic Knight, amalgamated with Captain Atom, appears in Countdown to Final Crisis.

== Collected editions ==
- The Atomic Knights (collects Strange Adventures #117, 120, 123, 126, 129, 132, 135, 138, 141, 144, 147, 150, 153, 156 and 160, ISBN 978-1-4012-2748-7)

== In other media ==
- Gardner Grayle appears in Black Lightning, portrayed by Boone Platt. This version is an A.S.A. sergeant.
- The 2006 incarnation of the Atomic Knights serve as inspiration for the Amethyst Knights, a group appearing in Creature Commandos.
- Atomic Knight makes a cameo appearance in Superman via a mural at the Hall of Justice.
- The Gardner Grayle incarnation of Atomic Knight appears in Justice League: Crisis on Infinite Earths, voiced by Keith Ferguson.
- Atomic Knight appears as a character summon in Scribblenauts Unmasked: A DC Comics Adventure.
