= Chris Cox (voice actor) =

American actor

- Born: Christopher Cox; October 23, 1969 (age 56); United States
- Education: Ohio University
- Occupation: Voice actor
- Years active: 1997–present

Chris Cox (born October 23, 1969) is an American voice actor who has worked on films, animated television series, and video games.

== Career ==
In television, he is best known for his work in Family Guy. He is also known for his work in Jak and Daxter, Skylanders, Batman: Arkham, and several Marvel, DC, and Star Wars titles. He co-created, co-wrote, and produced the reality TV program Small Shots which ran from 2001 to 2003. He was a writer for the 2005 television series Con, a supervising producer for the 2006 television sitcom Free Ride, and a writer for the 2007 webseries Voicemail.

== Filmography ==
=== Film ===
Year	Title	Role	Notes
1997	Swing Blade	Karl	Short
2006	Queer Duck: The Movie	Michael Jackson	Voice, direct-to-video
2007	Superman: Doomsday	Damon Swank	Voice, direct-to-video
2011	All-Star Superman	Lead Agent	Voice, direct-to-video
2012	Ted	Guy #2	
2012	The Reef 2: High Tide	Lou	Voice
2014	Batman: Assault on Arkham	Commissioner James Gordon	Voice, direct-to-video
2017	Transformers: The Last Knight	Knight of Iacon	Uncredited
2018	Batman: Gotham by Gaslight	Father Callahan	Voice, direct-to-video
2019	Batman: Hush	Scarecrow	Voice, direct-to-video
2021	Batman: Soul of the Dragon	Rip Jagger	Voice, direct-to-video

=== Television ===
Year	Title	Role	Notes
2000–2020	Family Guy	George W. Bush, Ross Fishman, additional voices	Voice, 114 episodes
2002	Dan Dare: Pilot of the Future	Hank Hogan	Voice, 26 episodes
2004	Static Shock	Steve Nash / Point Man	Voice, episode: "Hoop Squad"
2004–2006	Justice League Unlimited	Captain Atom / Nathaniel Adams, Shining Knight	Voice, 6 episodes
2005–2007	The Grim Adventures of Billy & Mandy	Principal Goodvibes, Meadowberry, additional voices	Voice, 16 episodes
2005–2010	American Dad!	George W. Bush, additional voices	Voice, 3 episodes
2006	The Batman	Thug with Utility Belt	Voice, episode: "The Breakout"
2008	Recount	George W. Bush	Voice, television film
2010	CollegeHumor Originals	Reporter #4	Episode: "The President Hasn't Seen Rocky"
2010–2012	The Avengers: Earth's Mightiest Heroes	Clint Barton / Hawkeye, Crimson Dynamo, Fandral, Rattler, Peter Corbeau, additional voices	Voice, 34 episodes
2011–2013	Mad	Additional voices	Voice, 45 episodes
2013	Greenboy: Prescription for Death	Voice	TV short
2013	The Anna Nicole Story	David Letterman sound-alike	Television film
2013–2014	Ultimate Spider-Man	Steve Rogers / Captain America, Peter Quill / Star-Lord	Voice, 2 episodes
2014	Avengers Assemble	Star-Lord	Voice, episode: "Guardians and Space Knights"
2014	Regular Show	Benny Harris	Voice, episode: "Bad Portrait"
2014	Clarence	Zookeeper, Ept 1	Voice, episode: "Zoo"
2014	Creature Commandos	Lt. Matthew Shrieve	Voice, 3 episodes; miniseries
2014	Hulk and the Agents of S.M.A.S.H.	Star-Lord	Voice, 2 episodes
2014–2015	BoJack Horseman	Additional voices	4 episodes
2015–2016	Mixels	Gox, Forx, Principal, Busto, Big Kid #7	Voice, 2 episodes
2016	TripTank	Sir William, Warrior, Sweating Ferret	2 episodes
2016–2018	Lost in Oz	Toto, additional voices	Voice, 26 episodes
2017	Jeff & Some Aliens	Barack Obama	Voice, episode: "Jeff & Some Colonists"
2019	Love, Death & Robots	Bob, Male Background	Voice, 2 episodes
2020	Solar Opposites	Additional voices	Voice, episode: "The Quantum Ring"
2020–2023	Animaniacs	Various voices	Voice, 10 episodes

=== Video games ===
Year	Title	Role	Notes
2000	Orphen: Scion of Sorcery	Volcan	English dub
2003	Star Wars Jedi Knight: Jedi Academy	Wedge Antilles	
2003	Jak II	Pecker, Agent 1	
2003	Star Wars Rogue Squadron III: Rebel Strike	Wedge Antilles, Admiral Ackbar, Boba Fett, Imperial Officer, Wingman	
2003	Kill.Switch	Soldier	
2003	Secret Weapons Over Normandy	James Chase	
2004	Scooby-Doo 2: Monsters Unleashed	Fred Jones	
2004	Star Wars: Battlefront	Gungan, Rebel Soldier, Rebel Vanguard, Rebel Pilot, Battle Droid	
2004	EverQuest II	Additional voices	
2004	Jak 3	Pecker	
2004	Metal Gear Solid 3: Snake Eater	Soldiers	English dub
2004	Star Wars Knights of the Old Republic II: The Sith Lords	Additional voices	
2004	Medal of Honor: Pacific Assault	Jimmy Sullivan	
2005	Mercenaries: Playground of Destruction	Sergei Voronov, Allied Soldier, Allied Pilots	
2005	Shadow of Rome	Marcus Antonius	
2005	Killer7	Gabriel Clemence	English dub
2005	Jak X: Combat Racing	Pecker, Thugs	
2005	Metal Gear Solid 3: Subsistence	Soldiers	English dub
2006	Star Wars: Empire at War	X-Wing Pilot	
2006	Marvel: Ultimate Alliance	Silver Surfer	
2007	Unreal Tournament 3	Reaper	
2008	Lost: Via Domus	Elliott Maslow	
2008	Dark Sector	Soldiers	
2008	The Princess Bride Game	Impressive Clergyman, Yellin	
2008	Star Wars: The Force Unleashed	Proto Rebel	
2008	Rise of the Argonauts	Additional voices	
2008	SOCOM U.S. Navy SEALs: Confrontation	Commando 1	
2008	Fracture	Additional voices	
2008	Tom Clancy's EndWar	Additional voices	
2008	Gears of War 2	Beta 4 Soldier, Centaur Driver, KR Pilot	
2008	Aion	Additional voices	
2009	The Godfather II	Dominic	
2009	Batman: Arkham Asylum	Eddie Burlow, Masked Guard	
2009	Jak and Daxter: The Lost Frontier	Ruskin, Barter	
2009	Dragon Age: Origins	Additional voices	
2010	Valkyria Chronicles II	Vario Kraatz	English dub
2010	Tom Clancy's H.A.W.X 2	Additional voices	
2010	Vanquish	Additional voices	English dub
2010	Star Wars: The Force Unleashed II	Rebel Soldier	
2011	Marvel vs. Capcom 3: Fate of Two Worlds	Hawkeye	
2011	Bulletstorm	Rell	
2011	Might & Magic Heroes VI	Goink	
2011	Operation Flashpoint: Red River	Alpha Fireteam Leader	
2011	Marvel Super Hero Squad Online	Captain Marvel, Archangel, Scarlet Spider	
2011	F.E.A.R. 3	Additional voices	
2011	Gears of War 3	KR-03 Pilot	
2011	Skylanders: Spyro's Adventure	Glumshanks	
2011	Batman: Arkham City	Eddie Burlow, Floyd Lawton / Deadshot	
2011	Ultimate Marvel vs. Capcom 3	Hawkeye	English dub
2011	Saints Row: The Third	Additional voices	
2011	Final Fantasy XIII-2	Additional voices	English dub
2011	Star Wars: The Old Republic	Additional voices	
2012	Kinect Star Wars	Sun Guards	
2012	Spec Ops: The Line	Agent Rick Gould, Exile Gunner	
2012	Guild Wars 2	Sigfast	
2012	XCOM: Enemy Unknown	Soldier	
2012	Skylanders: Giants	Glumshanks	
2012	Marvel Avengers: Battle for Earth	Iron Man, Doctor Strange, Iceman	
2012	Family Guy: Back to the Multiverse	Additional voices	
2013	Gears of War: Judgment	Garron Paduk	
2013	Star Trek	Additional voices	
2013	Marvel Heroes	Hawkeye, Colossus	
2013	The Smurfs 2: The Video Game	Gutsy	
2013	Saints Row IV	Additional voices	
2013	Skylanders: Swap Force	Glumshanks	
2013	Batman: Arkham Origins Blackgate	Floyd Lawton / Deadshot	
2013	Batman: Arkham Origins	Floyd Lawton / Deadshot	
2013	Call of Duty: Ghosts	Additional voices	
2013	Lightning Returns: Final Fantasy XIII	Additional voices	
2014	Disney Infinity: Marvel Super Heroes	Star-Lord	
2014	Middle-earth: Shadow of Mordor	Orcs	
2014	Skylanders: Trap Team	Glumshanks	
2014	Tales from the Borderlands	Additional voices	
2014	Star Wars: The Old Republic - Shadow of Revan	Additional voices	Expansion
2015	Batman: Arkham Knight	Additional voices	
2015	Disney Infinity 3.0	Star-Lord	
2015	Skylanders: SuperChargers	Glumshanks	
2015	Lego Dimensions	Additional voices	
2016	Lego Marvel's Avengers	Happy Hogan	
2016	Batman: The Telltale Series	Additional voices	
2016	Mafia III	Additional voices	
2016	Skylanders: Imaginators	Glumshanks	
2016	Final Fantasy XV	Additional voices	
2017	Guardians of the Galaxy: The Telltale Series	Jyn-Xar, Scientist	
2017	Marvel vs. Capcom: Infinite	Hawkeye	
2018	Marvel Powers United VR	Star-Lord, Hawkeye	
2018	Spider-Man	Additional voices	
2018	Call of Duty Black Ops 4	Additional voices	
2018	Spyro Reignited Trilogy	Additional voices	
2019	The Lego Movie 2 Videogame	Additional voices	
2019	Marvel Ultimate Alliance 3: The Black Order	Hawkeye, Colossus	
2019	Gears 5	Garron Paduk	
2019	Mortal Kombat 11	Terminator	
2019	Star Wars Jedi: Fallen Order	Additional voices	
2020	Ghost of Tsushima	Additional voices	
2022	Tactics Ogre: Reborn	Canophus Wolph, Volaq Windsalf	English dub
2022	Bayonetta 3	Connor Sigurd, Midmyers Sigurd, Singularity	English dub
2022	Star Ocean: The Divine Force	Bennett Maudsley	English dub
2023	Bayonetta Origins: Cereza and the Lost Demon	Singularity	English dub
2024	Batman: Arkham Shadow	Floyd Lawton /Deadshot, Lagase	
2025	Mortal Kombat 1	Conan the Barbarian	
2025	Dune Awakening	Barnabass Brightmorn, Tleilaxu Trader, Harkonnen Quartermaster, Atreides Quartermaster	

=== Other ===
Year	Title	Role	Notes
2001–2003	Small Shots	Himself	2 episodes, also writer and producer
2005	Con		Writer
2006	Let's Talk Puberty for Girls	Narrator/Boy	Voice, video
2006	Free Ride		Supervising Producer
2007	Voicemail		Writer
2009	Seth MacFarlane's Cavalcade of Cartoon Comedy	Fish	Voice, 2 episodes, web series
2010	Held Up	Police 1	Video
2010	I Want Your Money	Jimmy Carter	Voice, documentary film
2012–2013	The Untold History of the United States	Additional voices	
2016	Trolls		ADR Group (Miscellaneous Crew)
