= Bethesda (film) =

- Directed by: Andrew Lewis; Isaac Lewis
- Written by: Matt Black
- Produced by: William Kaufman; Andrew Lewis; Isaac Lewis; Jon Wroblewski; Christian Sosa; Adrian Testolin; Grant Wakefield
- Starring: Max Martini; Brianna Hildebrand; James Landry Hébert; Julio Cesar Cedillo; Verónica Falcón; Marlene Forte; Drew Van Acker; Mark Ashworth
- Cinematography: Sean Patrick Kirby
- Music by: Anna Drubich
- Production companies: Denton Film; Roosevelt Film Lab
- Country: United States
- Language: English

Bethesda is an upcoming American neo-western thriller film directed by Andrew and Isaac Lewis in their directorial debut, and written by Matt Black. It stars Max Martini, Brianna Hildebrand, James Landry Hébert, Julio Cesar Cedillo, Verónica Falcón, Marlene Forte, Drew Van Acker, and Mark Ashworth.

== Cast ==
- Max Martini as Norman
- Brianna Hildebrand as Jolene
- James Landry Hébert as Leland
- Julio Cesar Cedillo as Emmett
- Verónica Falcón as Clara
- Marlene Forte as Marta
- Drew Van Acker as Carter
- Mark Ashworth as Anthony

== Production ==
In April 2025, it was reported that principal photography had concluded in Texas on a neo-western thriller film titled Bethesda, which was directed by Andrew and Isaac Lewis, and written by Matt Black. In July, Max Martini, Brianna Hildebrand, James Landry Hébert, Julio Cesar Cedillo, Verónica Falcón, Marlene Forte, Drew Van Acker, and Mark Ashworth were revealed to have joined the cast of the film.
