= Julio Cesar Cedillo =

Mexican actor (born 1970)

Julio César Cedillo
- Born: January 1, 1970 (age 56); Durango, Mexico
- Occupation: Actor
- Height: 183 cm (6 ft 0 in)

Julio César Cedillo (born January 1, 1970) is a Mexican actor, best known for the title role in the 2005 film The Three Burials of Melquiades Estrada.

== Early life ==
Cedillo was born in Durango, Mexico in January 1, 1970 (age 56), but grew up in Fort Worth, Texas. In 1988, he graduated from Dunbar High School.

== Career ==
Cedillo appeared in several television productions in the 1990s, including Wishbone as Travis Del Rio, Oakdale's Sports and Games store owner. He made his film debut in 2000 in All the Pretty Horses. Other films include The Rookie, Serving Sara, The Life of David Gale, The Alamo, Cowboys & Aliens and Sicario.

== Filmography ==
- The Three Burials of Melquiades Estrada (2005)
- The Mist (2007)
- In The Electric Mist (2009)
- Cowboys & Aliens (2011)
- Frontera (2014)
- Sicario (2015)
- The Harder They Fall (2021)
- Chocolate Lizards (2022)
- The Black Demon (2023)
- A Million Miles Away (2023)
- The Holiday Hitman (2026)
- Bethesda (TBA)

=== Video games ===
- The Terminator: Dawn of Fate - Kyle Reese
- Age of Empires II: The Conquerors Expansion
- Borderlands - Mordecai

=== Television ===
- Wishbone (1997 - 1998) - Travis Del Rio
- The Good Guys ("Hunches & Heists") (2010)
- The Walking Dead (Lieutenant Welles, Season 3, Ep. 3) (2012)
- Narcos: Mexico (Comandante Guillermo González Calderoni, 3 Episodes) (2018)
- Chicago P.D. (Rafael Perez) (3 episodes)
