= Mort Weisinger =

American comic book writer (1915–1978)

- Weisinger and DC Comics proofreader Gerda Gattel in 1975
- Born: Mortimer Weisinger; April 25, 1915 New York City, New York, U.S.
- Died: May 7, 1978 (aged 63) Great Neck, New York, U.S.
- Areas: Writer, Editor
- Notable works: Action Comics; Superman
- Awards: Inkpot Award (1978); Eisner Award Hall of Fame (2010)

Mortimer Weisinger (/ˈwaɪzɪŋɡər/; April 25, 1915 – May 7, 1978) was an American magazine and comic book editor best known for editing DC Comics' Superman during the mid-1950s to 1960s, in the Silver Age of comic books. He also co-created such features as Aquaman, Green Arrow, Johnny Quick, and the original Vigilante, served as story editor for the Adventures of Superman television series, and compiled the often-revised paperback 1001 Valuable Things You Can Get Free.

== Biography ==
=== Early life and SF fandom ===
Weisinger was born in the Washington Heights section of New York City and was raised in the Bronx, as the son of Austrian Jewish parents. His father was a businessman in the garment trade. At 13, he was introduced to science fiction by means of a borrowed copy of the August 1928 issue of Amazing Stories (featuring Buck Rogers and The Skylark of Space). By 1930, Weisinger was active in some of the earliest SF fan clubs and fanzines, including The Planet. In 1931, Weisinger hosted a meeting of pioneer SF fan club "The Scienceers", which was attended by a young Julius Schwartz, who recalled that the two became "very friendly... [and] got along well together." A year later, Weisinger, Schwartz and Allen Glasser joined fellow-future professional editor Forrest J. Ackerman in founding The Time Traveller, which they styled "Science Fiction's Only Fan Magazine". The claim was more than mere youthful bravado, according to SF historian Sam Moskowitz, who described the 'zine as the first devoted entirely to science fiction. Drawing on information they had gleaned from writing letters to the SF magazines and authors of the day, the young fans published interviews with, and short pieces by, established SF writers, and in the process gained increasing familiarity with the personalities and situations of the genre in that era. The first issue featured "a one-page biography of Edward 'Doc' Smith... [and] some news items."

=== Early career ===
After high school, Weisinger attended New York University, where he worked as editor of the college's newspaper and magazine, but left before graduating. With Schwartz, he approached the editor of Amazing Stories (T. Connor Sloane) and "sold his first story": 'The Price of Peace'. In late 1934, Weisinger suggested that he and Schwartz "ought to go into the agency business," noting (according to Schwartz) that the duo had

"...got to know a lot of writers and artists and so on... [Mort explained] 'When a writer writes a story he lives out of town, and he mails it to Amazing Stories. If it's rejected, it has to go all the way back to California. So he sends it to Wonder Stories. Then it goes back and forth, because they send it blind. They don't know what the editor wants. Now we talk to the editors, and he can find out if they want an interplanetary story of about six thousand words, or if they want this or that. Then we can relay this information to the writers. And of course we can become their agents and collect the usual fee of 10%.' "

Schwartz concurred, and they formed the Solar Sales Service ("We always believed in alliteration," noted Schwartz), the first literary agency to specialize in the related genres of SF, horror, and fantasy. Edmond Hamilton was the agency's first client, and Otto Binder soon followed. Solar Sales eventually represented many prominent SF and fantasy writers, including John Russell Fearn, Alfred Bester, Stanley Weinbaum, H. P. Lovecraft, and Ray Bradbury. But while Schwartz continued the agency into the early 1940s, Weisinger moved on; he took a job with the Standard Magazine chain, publisher of a range of pulp magazines. Standard had acquired writer-publisher Hugo Gernsback's defunct Wonder Stories and added it to Standard series of "Thrilling" publications (Thrilling Detective, Thrilling Western, and others). Weisinger became the editor of Thrilling Wonder Stories, and bought stories by Hamilton and others from his former partner Schwartz. Weisinger was soon editing a range of other pulps by Standard, including Startling Stories and Captain Future, and "was in charge of no fewer than 40 titles" by 1940.

== National Periodical Publications (DC Comics) ==
=== Army service ===
In March 1941, Weisinger moved from Standard Magazines to National Periodicals (later DC Comics) primarily as editor of the Superman and Batman titles. Among his earliest jobs, however, was the task of "dream[ing] up some new characters" – these resulted in the line-up of More Fun Comics #73, and took the form of Aquaman, Green Arrow, Johnny Quick and Vigilante. Weisinger's fledgling career was soon interrupted when he was conscripted in 1942, and he served as a sergeant in Special Services. Stationed at Yale (and rooming with Broderick Crawford and William Holden), he wrote scripts for a U.S. Army "radio show called 'I Sustain the Wings' " in New York City.

He met and married (Sept. 27, 1943) his wife, the former Thelma Rudnick. They had two children, a daughter, Joyce, and son, Hendrie.

=== Superman innovations ===
Adventure Comics #296 (May 1962). Editor Weisinger's Superman and Superboy stories often featured outlandish situations. Cover art by Curt Swan, inks by George Klein.

Weisinger returned to his job at National after his discharge from military service in 1946, and resumed his editorship of the Superman comics, the Batman titles and others. His tenure was marked by the introduction of a variety of new concepts and supporting characters, including Supergirl, Krypto the Superdog, the Phantom Zone, the bottle city of Kandor, the Legion of Super-Heroes, and a variety of types of kryptonite. Attempting to rationalize Superman's powers, it was under Weisinger's watch that the "concept that in a world circling a yellow sun [as opposed to Krypton's red sun] his [Superman's] powers are multiplied" came to be introduced to the Superman mythology.

Realizing that "Batman was my favorite [character]," Weisinger realised that the crucial difference was that "Batman can get hurt." In order to better allow the reader to identify with the invulnerable Man of Steel, Weisinger frequently featured stories in which "Superman lost his powers and had to survive on his natural wits." Pitted against Superman's wits was Lois Lane, and under Weisinger's editorship stories in which she sought to prove that Superman was Clark Kent abounded.

Weisinger "enjoyed surprising the readers," and to that end introduced a number of "live personalities... real people" into the comics, including Candid Camera's Allen Funt, This Is Your Life's Ralph Edwards, Steve Allen, Ann Blyth and Pat Boone among others. Weisinger was particularly "proud of having dreamed up the "imaginary story" gimmick to motivate otherwise impossible stories," (non-canonical 'what if...?' scenarios not bound to series or character continuity, timeframe or logic), and for "having conceived the idea of DC's first giant anthology - The Superman Annual."

=== The Adventures of Superman ===
Weisinger "eventually gave up editorship of Batman and many of the other magazines and concentrated on the #1 superhero," both in the comics and elsewhere. In the early 1950s, he was "called out to California by Whitney Ellsworth . . . to work as story editor for the Superman TV series." Weisinger recalled in 1975 about this experience that

On the way out to the coast, we sat in a roomette on a train with a tape recorder and plotted about fifteen stories for the series. I met George Reeves, the actor who played Superman and was one helluva nice guy – very, very unaffected. The amazing thing was that when you met Reeves you said, 'My lord, it's Clark Kent!' It was like seeing Clark step out of the comic pages into three dimensions.

Through Weisinger's previous "experience with television," Reeves landed "a guest star spot, "Big Red S" and all, on the I Love Lucy show."

Weisinger's influences on up-and-coming writers in SF and comics also extended, by these means, to television. Jackson Gillis was shepherded from his work on The Adventures of Superman to Perry Mason and Columbo (alongside many, many other credits). Weisinger also highlights David Chantler, William Woolfolk and Leigh Brackett as "examples of proteges and associates who have surpassed him in term of success."

=== Superman editorship ===
Weisinger was sole editor of all of the Superman titles from 1958 until his retirement from comics in 1970.

Many of Weisinger's ideas came from talking to kids in his neighborhood, asking them what they wanted to see, and then attempting to riff on those ideas. Such talks inspired him to create the Lois Lane and Jimmy Olsen spin-off titles "over a lot of opposition" from the management who "protested that the characters weren't strong enough." Weisinger later bought a story from Jim Shooter while unaware of the writer's age, and hired him for a popular run on "The Legion of Super-Heroes" even after discovering that he was only 14 years old.

Weisinger encouraged a static picture book style of illustration in his stories, and was known for reusing previously published stories as new story ideas. A noted example of this is a 1950s story featuring Superman encountering an alien being he thought might have been his long-lost brother; this was reused in the early 1960s as a Superboy story introducing Mon-El.

Over time, Weisinger found himself growing disenchanted, and even embarrassed to reveal his primary job, saying "When people asked me what I did for a living, I would suppress the fact that I was editing Superman. I'd tell people that I wrote for Collier's or The Saturday Evening Post." He recalls that he attempted to get himself removed from his editorial position by "asking for bigger and bigger raises," but instead found his demands met – even to the extent that he was given "generous stock options" and "made a vice president of public relations for the company." He did eventually leave, and bought himself a white Cadillac to "bolster my ego."

=== Management style ===
Weisinger was criticized by some for having a micromanaging attitude and a heavy-handed, overbearing treatment of his writers and artists. He was well known for his abusive treatment of the DC employees. Indeed, his son also confirms he was abusive to restaurant waiters as well. Criticism has also been leveled at Weisinger for quashing creativity by dictating storylines. Jim Shooter, who wrote for years under his editorship, praised Weisinger's "rules" for writing comics but criticized his rigid adherence to them: "Mort's rules always worked, story-mechanics-wise. Easy, idiot-proof, safe. Trying things that explored the frontiers beyond the confines of Mort's rules was tricky—fraught with opportunities to fail—but if you were daring, if you had the necessary depth of understanding and the skills, you could do wonderful things." Weisinger has commented, "People have always accused me of being an egomaniac as an editor because I always gave the writers my own plots. I did that for a reason. If I asked a writer to bring in his own plots, and he spent a weekend on four of them, and I didn't like any of the four, then he's wasted a whole weekend. ... The least I could do was to think of a plot for the writer and if he liked it – I'd never force it down his throat – we'd kick it around and evolve a story."

One concept Weisinger brought to comics from the pulps was creating a story "around a pre-drawn cover", a concept taken up across the industry, most notably by colleague Julius Schwartz. During Weisinger's reign, the Superman comics maintained a reasonably tight internal continuity, but related little to the rest of the DC Universe. Weisinger was succeeded in 1970 by his childhood friend and longtime colleague Julius Schwartz. Weisinger was later immortalized within the Superman comics "as a bust in Clark Kent's apartment."

== Articles and books ==
In addition to his SF agency and extensive editorial work for DC Comics, Weisinger found time – particularly after his retirement from DC – to write a considerable number of articles for a wide variety of magazines. Weisinger was reported, in 1975, as having "had articles in The Journal of the AMA, Reader's Digest, Collier's, The Saturday Evening Post... [and] Parade." His articles ranged from one on the Comics Code for Better Homes and Gardens to an article entitled "How Ralph Edwards Fools 'Em" for which he "accompanied Edwards on several This Is Your Life escapades to get the story of how the clever impresario suckered the celebrities whom he was to honor on his popular '50s show."

Weisinger occasionally contributed articles to the writers' magazines – Writer's Digest, The Author & Journalist, etc. – from the 1930s through the 1950s. From 1934 to 1935, for Writer’s Review, he produced gossipy reports on the activities of pulp writers.

Weisinger had a particular interest in beauty contests, writing an article for Parade on "why certain finalists in the Miss America pageant can never win the crown," as well as a "best-selling novel" entitled The Contest (published in hardback by World, and in paperback by New American Library). Weisinger had once been a "judge in a preliminary Miss America contest," through which he "learned the inside story," later travelling to Europe with the then-"world-famous host of the real-life contest," a friend of Weisinger's at the time who refused to talk to him again after reading the resulting novel. For the author, however, The Contest netted a $125,000 movie option and "printings in several foreign languages."

Weisinger's best known book was "a compendium of freebies available to anyone" entitled 1001 Valuable Things You Can Get For Free, first published in 1955 and which (as of 1975) had "gone through 41 paperback printings and sold over three million copies." Weisinger's book was praised by Abbie Hoffman in Steal This Book, and earned its author a place in "Who's Who".

== Later life ==
Weisinger lived for much of his life in Great Neck, New York, and stayed there until his death from a heart attack. In 1985, he was posthumously named as one of the honorees by DC Comics in the company's 50th anniversary publication Fifty Who Made DC Great.
