= Mark Ashworth =

American actor

- Occupation: Actor
- Years active: 2008–present

Mark Ashworth is an English actor. He is known for his work as Janitor Justin / Shining Knight in the DC Universe series Stargirl.

== Early life ==
Ashworth was born in Eccles, Salford, Great Britain.

== Career ==
In 2016, Ashworth played Preacher in The Magnificent Seven. In 2019, Ashworth starred in the movies Mine 9 and Along Came the Devil 2.

== Filmography ==
=== Film ===
Year	Title	Role	Notes
2016	The Magnificent Seven	Preacher	
2017	Logan	Bartender	
2018	Black Panther	Security Guard	
2019	Mine 9	Mark	
2019	Along Came the Devil 2	Kenny	
2019	Unravelled	David	
2020	Emperor	Reverend	
2021	Jungle Cruise	Society Member 1	
2025	Hold the Fort	Herbert	
TBA	Bethesda	Anthony	Post-production

=== Television ===
Year	Title	Role	Notes
2014	Constantine	Nervous Man	Episode: "Non Est Asylum"
2018	The Walking Dead	Evan	Episode: "Still Gotta Mean Something"
2020	Doom Patrol	Ringmaster	Two episodes: "Tyme Patrol" and "Fun Size Patrol"
2020	Stargirl	Sir Justin / Shining Knight	Recurring role
2021	The Underground Railroad	Mr. Churchill	Episode 1
2021	Creepshow	Norm Roberts	Episode: "Public Television of the Dead"
