= Adventure Comics =

Comic book series

- Adventure Comics #40 depicting the first superhero cover of the series featuring Sandman (Wesley Dodds) in the cover. Art by Creig Flessel.

Publication information
- Publisher: DC Comics
- Schedule: List: Monthly: #32–85, #103–424, #467–503 Bimonthly: #86–102, #425–66
- Format: List: (vol. 1) Standard (#32–490, #504–529) Digest (#491–503)
- Publication date: List: (vol. 1) November 1938 – February 1982; September 1982 – September 1983 (vol. 2) October 2009 – August 2010 (vol. 1 cont.) September 2010 – October 2011
- No. of issues: List: (vol. 1): 503 (vol. 2): 12, with a #0 issue (vol. 1 cont.): 14
- Main character: List: (vol. 1) Hourman Starman Manhunter Legion of Super-Heroes Superboy Supergirl Vigilante Crimson Avenger Spectre Aquaman Dial H for Hero Green Arrow Flash Deadman Justice Society of America Captain Marvel (vol. 2) Legion of Super-Heroes

Creative team
- Written by: List: (vol. 1) Otto Binder Michael Fleisher Mike Sekowsky Jim Shooter Cary Bates Paul Kupperberg Paul Levitz Len Wein John Albano (vol. 2) Sterling Gates
- Penciller: List: (vol. 1) Al Plastino Curt Swan Win Mortimer Jim Mooney Mike Sekowsky Bob Oksner Tony DeZuniga Gray Morrow Alex Toth Jim Aparo Mike Grell Dick Dillin Don Newton Joe Staton Irv Novick Dick Giordano Carmine Infantino (vol. 2) Francis Manapul Travis Moore (vol. 1 cont.) Mahmud Asrar Phil Jimenez
- Inker: List: (vol. 1) Jack Abel Dick Giordano Bob Oksner Romeo Tanghal (vol. 1 cont.) Andy Lanning

Adventure Comics is an American comic book series published by DC Comics from 1938 to 1983 and revived from 2009 to 2011. In its first era, the series ran for 503 issues (472 of those after the title changed from New Adventure Comics), making it the fifth-longest-running DC series, behind Detective Comics, Action Comics, Superman, and Batman. The series was revived in 2009 through a new "#1" issue by artist Clayton Henry and writer Geoff Johns. It returned to its original numbering with #516 (September 2010). The series ended again with #529 (October 2011) prior to a company-wide revision of DC's superhero comic book line, known as "The New 52".

== Publication history ==
New Comics #1 (December 1935), cover art by Vin Sullivan.

Adventure Comics began its nearly 50-year run in December 1935 under the title New Comics, which was only the second comic book series published by National Allied Publications, now DC Comics. The series was retitled New Adventure Comics with its 12th issue in January 1937. Issue #32 (November 1938) saw the title changed again to Adventure Comics, which would remain the book's name for the duration of its existence.

Cover of Adventure Comics #32 (November 1938), the first number under the Adventure Comics title; art by Creig Flessel.

Originally a humor comic, it evolved into a serious adventure series. In issue #12, while the series was briefly re-titled New Adventure Comics, Joe Shuster and Jerry Siegel introduced the first version of the character Jor-L as a science fiction detective in the far future; the character would eventually become the alien father of Superman, although the first Superman story, in Action Comics #1, would not appear until more than a year after Jor-L's first appearance. The series' focus gradually shifted to superhero stories starting with the debut of the Sandman in issue #40. Other superheroes who appeared in the early days of Adventure included Hourman (from #48 to #83); Starman created by writer Gardner Fox and artist Jack Burnley in issue #61 (April 1941) (#61–102); and Joe Simon and Jack Kirby's Manhunter replacing a similarly named business-suited investigator beginning with #73 (April 1942) until #92.

A pivotal issue of the series was #103 (April 1946), when Superboy, Green Arrow, Johnny Quick, and Aquaman moved to the series from their previous home in More Fun Comics, which was itself converted to a humor format. Starman's and Sandman's series were canceled to make room for the new features, while Genius Jones moved to the comic the new arrivals had just vacated, and Shining Knight continued in Adventure Comics as the only feature carried on from the preceding issue. Superboy became the star of the book, and would appear on each cover into 1969 (counting Superman on the covers of issues #354–355). Superboy's popularity in Adventure resulted in the character receiving his own title in 1949, when superhero titles in general were losing popularity. Krypto the Superdog debuted in issue #210 (March 1955) in a story by Otto Binder and Curt Swan.

In issue #247 (April 1958), by Otto Binder and artist Al Plastino, Superboy met the Legion of Super-Heroes, a team of super-powered teens from the future. The group became popular, and would replace "Tales of the Bizarro World" as the Adventure backup feature with #300, and soon be promoted to its lead. Lightning Lad, one of the Legion's founding members, was killed in Adventure Comics #304 (January 1963) and revived in issue #312. Issue #260 (May 1959) saw the first Silver Age appearance of Aquaman. In Adventure Comics #346 (July 1966), Jim Shooter, 14 years old at the time, wrote his first Legion story. Shooter wrote the story in which Ferro Lad died – the first "real" death of a Legionnaire (although Lightning Lad had been believed dead for a while before) – and introduced the Fatal Five. The Legion feature lasted until issue #380. With the next issue, Supergirl migrated from the backup slot in Action Comics to the starring feature in Adventure and ran until issue #424. The series reached its 400th issue in December 1970 and featured a Supergirl story written and drawn by Mike Sekowsky.

As of #425 (December 1972), the book's theme changed from superhero adventure to fantasy/supernatural adventure. That issue debuted one new feature along with three non-series stories, the pirate saga "Captain Fear". The next edition added a semi-anthology series, "The Adventurers' Club". Soon, editor Joe Orlando was trying out horror-tinged costumed heroes such as the Black Orchid, and then the Spectre. Before long, conventional superheroes returned to the book, beginning behind the Spectre, first a three-issue run of Aquaman (issues #435–437, an early assignment for Mike Grell) and then a newly drawn 1940s Seven Soldiers of Victory script (issues #438–443). Aquaman was promoted to lead (issues #441–452), and backing him up were three-part story arcs featuring the Creeper (#445–447), the Martian Manhunter (#449–451), bracketed by issue-length Aquaman leads. He was awarded his own title and Superboy (#453–458) took over Adventure with Aqualad (#453–455) and Eclipso (#457–458) backups. Following this was a run as a Dollar Comic format giant-sized book (issues #459–466), including such features as the resolution of Return of the New Gods (cancelled in July–August 1978), "Deadman", and the "Justice Society of America".

Feature	Feature	Feature	Feature	Feature	Feature
The Flash #459–466	Deadman #459–466	Green Lantern #459–460	Elongated Man #459	Wonder Woman #459–464	The New Gods #459–460
The Flash #459–466	Deadman #459–466	Justice Society of America #461–466	Aquaman #460–466	no fifth feature #465–466	no sixth feature #461–466

The standard format returned (issues #467–478), split between a new Starman named Prince Gavyn and Plastic Man. With an increase in the story-and-art page count, the last four issues also included one more run of Aquaman. All three were dropped simultaneously to make way for a new version of an old feature, "Dial H for Hero" (issues #479–490). Issue #490 (February 1982) saw the comic's cancellation. "Dial 'H' for Hero" was moved to New Adventures of Superboy as of that series' issue #28. Adventure Comics was soon rescued. As of the September issue it was revived as a digest-sized comic. This format lasted from issues #491–503, with most stories during this period being reprints (featuring the Legion of Super-Heroes, from the beginning and in chronological order, and others), and with new stories featuring the Marvel Family and the Challengers of the Unknown including a new five-issue retelling of their origin. The long-running title was discontinued with the September 1983 issue.

=== 80-Page Giant ===
An Adventure Comics 80-Page Giant was released in 1998.

=== Justice Society Returns ===
DC published an Adventure Comics #1 as part of the company's Justice Society Returns event in 1999.

=== Adventure Comics Special Featuring the Guardian ===
As part of the 2008 "Superman: New Krypton" story arc, a special issue of Adventure Comics was published, titled Adventure Comics Special Featuring the Guardian #1 (cover dated January 2009). Jimmy Olsen continues to delve into the mystery surrounding the American government's safeguards against the new Kryptonian population.

== Revival ==
Cover of Adventure Comics #504 vol. 2 #1, art by Francis Manapul.

The five-issue miniseries Final Crisis: Legion of 3 Worlds led into an all-new volume of Adventure Comics, featuring Conner Kent/Superboy and the Legion of Super-Heroes. The main creative team of Geoff Johns and Francis Manapul debuted in a backup story in Adventure Comics #0 (April 2009). A secondary feature starring the Legion of Super-Heroes was co-written with Mike Shoemaker and drawn by Clayton Henry. The first issue of the new run of Adventure Comics was released on August 12, 2009, and features watermarked numbering marking it as both #1 and #504, thus continuing the original numeration of the series concurrently with the volume 2 numeration. For the variant incentive cover editions, the original numeration was dominant on the cover while the vol. 2 numeration was the watermarked numbering marking. The indicia of the comic book also reflects this dual numbering. The title officially returned to its original vol. 1 numbering with #516 (cover dated September 2010), until #529 when it was finally ended prior to DC's The New 52 company reboot.

=== Main feature ===
==== Superboy: The Boy of Steel (former) ====
The revived ongoing title Adventure Comics features Conner Kent in the story arc "Superboy: The Boy of Steel", following his death in Infinite Crisis and resurrection in Final Crisis. It begins as Conner settles back into his life in Smallville, Kansas. Returning to live with Martha Kent, who is thrilled to take him in after her husband's death, Conner returns to Smallville High School and begins keeping a journal of everything Superman has done as a costumed hero, going down a checklist titled, "What Did Superman Do?" He and Bart Allen rejoin the Teen Titans, and Conner destroys his memorial statue outside of Titans Tower.

==== Superboy and the Legion of Super-Heroes ====
After the Johns and Manapul run, writer Paul Levitz took over the series. It was renumbered with its previous numbering and highlighted Clark Kent's years as Superboy as well as the Legion of Super-Heroes' past. Starting with issue #523, the Legion Academy, by Levitz and Phil Jimenez, became the major feature.

=== Second feature ===
==== Long Live the Legion (former) ====
The Legion of Super-Heroes appeared as the second feature in issues #504–514 before taking over as the lead feature in issue #515 (August 2010).

==== Atom ====
Following this was the one-shot Brightest Day: Atom, written by Jeff Lemire with art by Mahmud Asrar. The same team was to create a ten-part, ten-page "Atom" co-feature in Adventure Comics, but DC ended all its second features and reduced its titles to twenty pages of story. Issue #521 was the last issue to feature the Atom.

== Collected editions ==
- Golden Age Sandman Archives Volume 1 – collects stories from Adventure Comics #40–57, 224 pages, January 2005, ISBN 978-1401201555
- Golden Age Starman Archives
  - Volume 1 – collects stories from Adventure Comics #61–76, 224 pages, May 2000, ISBN 978-1563896224
  - Volume 2 – collects stories from Adventure Comics #77–102, 272 pages, July 2009, ISBN 978-1401222833
- The Sandman by Kirby and Simon – collects stories from Adventure Comics #72–102, 304 pages, August 2009, ISBN 978-1401222994
- The Adventures of Superboy – collects stories from Adventure Comics #103–121, 224 pages, August 2010, ISBN 978-1401227838
- Legion of Super-Heroes Archives
  - Volume 1 – collects stories from Adventure Comics #247, 267, 282, 290, 293, 300–305, 255 pages, 1991, ISBN 978-1563890208
  - Volume 2 – collects stories from Adventure Comics #306–317, 224 pages, 1992, ISBN 978-1563890574
  - Volume 3 – collects stories from Adventure Comics #318–328, 224 pages, 1993, ISBN 978-1563891021
  - Volume 4 – collects stories from Adventure Comics #329–339, 224 pages, 1994, ISBN 978-1563891236
  - Volume 5 – collects stories from Adventure Comics #340–349, 224 pages, 1994, ISBN 978-1563891540
  - Volume 6 – collects stories from Adventure Comics #350–358, 224 pages, 1996, ISBN 978-1563892776
  - Volume 7 – collects stories from Adventure Comics #359–367, 240 pages, May 1998, ISBN 978-1563893988
  - Volume 8 – collects stories from Adventure Comics #368–376, 240 pages, February 1999, ISBN 978-1563894305
  - Volume 9 – collects stories from Adventure Comics #377–380, 256 pages, November 1999, ISBN 978-1563895142
- Showcase Presents: Legion of Super-Heroes
  - Volume 1 – collects stories from Adventure Comics #247, 267, 282, 290, 293, 300–321, 552 pages, April 2007, ISBN 978-1401213824
  - Volume 2 – collects stories from Adventure Comics #322–348, 528 pages, April 2008, ISBN 978-1401217242
  - Volume 3 – collects stories from Adventure Comics #349–368, 552 pages, April 2009, ISBN 978-1401221850
  - Volume 4 – collects stories from Adventure Comics #369–380, 528 pages, October 2010, ISBN 978-1401229412
- Legion of Super-Heroes: The Silver Age Omnibus
  - Volume 1 – collects stories from Adventure Comics #247, 267, 282, 290, 293, 300–328, 688 pages, 2017, ISBN 978-1401271022
  - Volume 2 – collects stories from Adventure Comics #329-360, 680 pages, 2018, ISBN 978-1401280550
- Showcase Presents: Green Arrow Volume 1 – collects stories from Adventure Comics #250–266, 528 pages, January 2006, ISBN 978-1401207854
- Showcase Presents: Aquaman Volume 1 – collects stories from Adventure Comics #260–280, 282, 284, 544 pages, February 2007, ISBN 978-1401212230
- Superman: Tales of the Bizarro World – collects stories from Adventure Comics #293–299, 192 pages, September 2000, ISBN 978-1563896248
- DC Comics Classics Library: Legion of Super-Heroes: The Life and Death of Ferro Lad – collects stories from Adventure Comics #346–347, 352–355, 357, 128 pages, March 2009, ISBN 978-1401221935
- Black Canary Archives – collects stories from Adventure Comics #399 and #418–419, 224 pages, December 2000, ISBN 978-1563897344
- Wrath of the Spectre – collects stories from Adventure Comics #431–440, 200 pages, June 2005, ISBN 978-1401204747
- Showcase Presents: The Spectre – includes stories from Adventure Comics #431–440, 624 pages, May 2012, ISBN 978-1401234171
- The Spectre: The Wrath of the Spectre Omnibus collects stories from Adventure Comics #431-440, 680 pages, September 2020, ISBN 978-1779502933
- Deadman Omnibus collects stories from Adventure Comics 460-466, 944 pages, December 2020, ISBN 978-1779504883
- Justice Society Volume 2 – collects stories from Adventure Comics #461–466, 224 pages, February 2007, ISBN 978-1401211943
- Showcase Presents: All Star Comics – includes stories from Adventure Comics #461–466, 448 pages, September 2011, ISBN 978-1401233037
- The Steve Ditko Omnibus Volume 2 – includes Starman stories from Adventure Comics #467–478, 384 pages, January 2012, ISBN 978-1401232351
- DC Comics Presents: Legion of Super-Heroes #2 – collects stories from Adventure Comics vol. 2, issues #1–4, 100 pages, February 2012
- Superboy: The Boy of Steel – collects stories from Adventure Comics vol. 2, issues #0–3, 5–6, 144 pages, May 2011, ISBN 978-1401227739
- Blackest Night: Tales of the Corps – collects stories from Adventure Comics vol. 2, issues #4–5, 176 pages, August 2011, ISBN 978-1401228071
- Blackest Night: Rise of the Black Lanterns – includes story from Adventure Comics vol. 2, issue #7, 256 pages, August 2011, ISBN 978-1401228064
- Superman: Last Stand of New Krypton
  - Volume 1 – collects stories from Adventure Comics vol. 2, #8–9, 168 pages, November 2010, ISBN 978-1401229320
  - Volume 2 – collects stories from Adventure Comics vol. 2, #10–11, 128 pages, January 2011, ISBN 978-1401230364
- Superman: Nightwing and Flamebird Volume 2 – collects stories from Adventure Comics vol. 2, #8–10, 208 pages, October 2011, ISBN 978-1401229405
- Superboy and the Legion of Super-Heroes: The Early Years collects Adventure Comics #515–520, Vol. 2 #12, 144 pages, May 2011, ISBN 978-1401231682
- Legion of Super-Heroes Vol. 2: Consequences collects Adventure Comics #521–522, 208 pages, September 2011, ISBN 978-1401232382
- Legion of Super-Heroes Vol. 3: When Evil Calls collects Adventure Comics #523–529, 320 pages, April 2012, ISBN 978-1401233679

== Awards ==
The series has won several awards for itself and its creators over the years, including the Shazam Award for Best Pencil Artist (Humor Division) for Bob Oksner for his work on Adventure Comics and other DC comics in 1970.

== See also ==
- List of DC Comics publications
