= Leading Comics =

Leading Comics Leading Screen Comics
- Cover of Leading Comics #9 (Winter 1943), featuring the Seven Soldiers of Victory.

Publication information
- Publisher: DC Comics
- Schedule: Quarterly: #1-17; 8 Times a Year: #65-76; Bi-monthly: #18-64, #77
- Format: Ongoing series
- Publication date: (Leading); Winter 1941-1942 - Oct/Nov 1948 (Leading Screen); Dec/Jan 1948 - Aug/Sept 1955
- No. of issues: (Leading); 41 (Leading Screen); 36

Leading Comics is a 1942–1955 comic book published by what is now DC Comics during the 1940s and early 1950s, a period known to fans and historians as the Golden Age of Comic Books.

At the title's inception, DC was actually two companies, National Comics (later National Periodical Publications) and All-American Publications. National and All-American shared some ownership and advertised and co-branded their comics as if they were one company. They also collaborated on All Star Comics, an All-American publication which featured the Justice Society of America, a super hero team including characters from both companies' stables, e.g., The Spectre and Starman from National, The Flash and Green Lantern from All-American.

Given the success of the JSA, National decided to develop a team title of its own—this became Leading Comics, #1 (Winter 1941–42) of which debuted the Seven Soldiers of Victory, a team made up exclusively of characters from National's anthology publications: More Fun Comics, Adventure Comics, Action Comics, Detective Comics, and Star-Spangled Comics. Like its predecessor All Star Comics, each issue of Leading was taken up with a single adventure of the SSOV broken into multiple chapters, each featuring one or two heroes. However, the heroes of the SSOV were hardly the company's most popular characters—most of those already being members of the JSA—and the strip lasted through only the first fourteen issues of Leading.

Cover of Leading Screen Comics #59 (February–March 1953), featuring Peter Porkchops (left).

When the superhero genre faded in popularity in the late 1940s, DC Comics decided to focus more on other genres, such as science fiction, westerns, humor and romance. Leading Comics led the charge as the first DC title to drop its superheroes. With its Summer 1945 issue #15, Leading switched to talking animals, with the introduction of Nero Fox (a fox who was billed as the "jive-jumpin' emperor of ancient Rome"). In issue #23 (February–March 1947), Nero Fox was dropped as the cover-featured first story in each issue, to be replaced by Peter Porkchops, a pig (created by Otto Feuer), in his first appearance. Peter appeared in Leading Comics (retitled Leading Screen Comics with #34 in 1948) regularly until issue #77 (August–September 1955).

Leading Screen Comics ended with issue #77 (August–September 1955).
