= Small Shots =

American reality TV program

- Genre: Reality
- Country of origin: United States

Original release
- Network: The New TNN

Small Shots is an American reality television series about two young filmmakers traveling across the country, going to small towns and using real people to make short movie spoofs. It was shown on The New TNN.
