= Crimson Avenger =

- The Golden Age Crimson Avenger, cover of Detective Comics #22 (December 1938); art by Jim Chambers.

Publication information
- Publisher: DC Comics
- First appearance: Detective Comics #20 (October 1938)
- Created by: Jim Chambers

In-story information
- Alter ego: Lee Walter Travis
- Team affiliations: All-Star Squadron; Seven Soldiers of Victory
- Notable aliases: Huitzilopochtli
- Abilities: Trained soldier and skilled in martial arts

Crimson Avenger (Lee Walter Travis) is a masked crime-fighter character published by DC Comics. He first appeared in Detective Comics #20 (October 1938). He is the first costumed hero published in Detective Comics, preceding Batman and appearing the same year after Action Comics #1 debuted characters including Superman, which led to the Golden Age of Comic Books. He is sometimes depicted as one of the first masked heroes within the fictional DC Universe. He is also known as a founding member of DC's second depicted superhero team, the Seven Soldiers of Victory.

== Publication history ==
Crimson Avenger (along with his sidekick Wing) first appeared in the DC Comics anthology American comic book series Detective Comics in issue #20. The Crimson Avenger had many similarities to The Green Hornet, including a sidekick named Wing who was an Asian valet, and a gas gun that he used to subdue opponents. In his early appearances he dressed in a red trenchcoat, a fedora, with a red mask covering his face; except for the red, he was visually similar to The Shadow. Later, when superheroes became more popular than costumed vigilantes, his costume was changed to a more standard superhero outfit, consisting of red tights, yellow boots, trunks and crest, and a "sun" symbol which was revealed in 2003 to be a stylized bullet hole. The character continued appearing in Detective Comics until issue #89 (July 1944).

According to Jess Nevins' Encyclopedia of Golden Age Superheroes, "most of his opponents are ordinary, but there is the Boss and his zombies, the occasional mad scientist, and some name villains like Echo, Methuselah, and the crime genius the Brain". In 1941, the Crimson Avenger joined the Seven Soldiers of Victory, a second superteam styled after the popular Justice Society of America appearing in All-Star Comics. The Seven Soldiers debuted in Leading Comics #1 (December 1941), and continued until #14 (March 1945).

== Fictional character biography ==
Two separate accounts of Crimson Avenger's origins have been printed, which complement each other in some areas, but contradict in others. The first backstory appeared in Secret Origins #5 (August 1986), and was written by Roy Thomas, with art by Gene Colan. Lee Travis, the young publisher of the Globe-Leader newspaper, attends a costume ball on Halloween in 1938. This is the night of Orson Welles' broadcast of The War of the Worlds. Having gotten advance notice of the radio show, a group of criminals dressed in alien-like costumes take advantage of the ensuing panic to rob the party guests. The villains murder a young journalist and Travis is enraged, going after the costumed thieves and exchanging gunfire. Travis drives the thieves into a ditch and disappears before the police arrive, now inspired to become the Crimson Avenger. The use of Orson Welles' War of the Worlds in the story was inspired by the fact that Crimson Avenger's first comic book appearance was dated October 1938, the same month as the radio broadcast.

The second, extended origin appeared in Golden Age Secret Files & Origins (2001). In this version, Lee Travis was a war-weary man of the world trying to forget the horrors of the Wars and seek some inner peace of mind. To this end, he briefly settled in the mystical city of Nanda Parbat, where he was shown the future career of Superman by Rama Kushna. When Travis returned to civilization, he found that nearly ten years had gone by for the rest of the world, at which point he took to the streets as the Crimson, and later the Crimson Avenger.

In a one shot story named "Whatever Happened to the Crimson Avenger?" featured in DC Comics Presents #38 (October 1981), Lee Travis learns that he is suffering from an incurable terminal illness. Though he accepts that his life is nearing its end, he is troubled by the realization that the world has all but forgotten the Crimson Avenger. After a lifetime of fighting for justice, Travis fears that he will leave nothing behind and that his legacy will vanish with him. Brooding over his fate, Travis notices a ship flashing an SOS signal from its lights.

Refusing to ignore a call for help, he dons his Crimson Avenger costume one last time and sets out to investigate. Along the way, he spots a young child falling from an apartment window. Acting on instinct, Travis catches the boy and saves his life. The boy’s grateful mother thanks the masked hero and asks for his name. As he continues on his way, Travis simply replies, “They call me the Crimson Avenger.”

When he reaches the ship, Travis discovers that criminals have hijacked it in an attempt to steal its cargo of unstable chemical waste. Travis confronts the criminals, but during the struggle, a grenade ignites a fire that threatens to trigger a catastrophic explosion, potentially killing hundreds of people in the harbor and the surrounding city. Realizing the danger, Travis orders the crew to abandon ship while he takes control of the vessel and steers it toward open water. With little hope of survival, he faces the prospect of death with a newfound sense of peace. He finally understands that his legacy does not depend on whether the world remembers his name. What matters is that he has made a difference, that he has saved lives, and that he has done good in the time he was given. As the ship reaches a safe distance from the harbor, it erupts in a massive explosion, killing Travis but sparing everyone else and preventing a far greater tragedy.

In the aftermath, police question the captain, asking him to identify the mysterious hero who saved the crew and the city. Unfortunately, the smoke and chaos prevented anyone from getting a clear look at the masked man. The captain can offer no name, and the Crimson Avenger’s final act of heroism appears destined to go unrecognized. The story concludes with the bittersweet revelation that the world will never learn the truth about Lee Travis’s final sacrifice. History will forget the Crimson Avenger, and the man behind the mask will remain unknown. Yet his legacy will endure in an unexpected way. The mother of the boy Travis saved, tells her son the story of the Crimson Avenger who caught him that day. She tells him that when he grows older, he must tell the story to his own children, ensuring that the hero’s memory lives on through generations. The story closes with her telling her son, "We must never forget the Crimson Avenger.”

== Other versions ==
The Jill Carlyle incarnation of Crimson Avenger as depicted in JSA #52 (November 2003). Art by Carlos Pacheco.

- Albert Elwood, an eccentric inventor, made a single appearance as the Crimson Avenger in World's Finest Comics #131 (February 1963) and attempted to help Superman, Batman and Robin thwart the robberies of the Octopus Gang. Elwood helps the heroes capture the gang and retires right afterward.
- An alternate universe version of Lee Travis / Crimson Avenger appears in Batman: Detective No. 27. This version is a detective.
- King Crimson, a character based on Crimson Avenger, appears in Kingdom Come.

=== Jill Carlyle ===
A female Crimson Avenger first appeared in Stars and S.T.R.I.P.E. #9 (April 2000), created by Geoff Johns and Scott Kolins. This version is a minor Spirit of Vengeance and a lawyer who lost a case in which the defendant was clearly guilty. She obtained a pair of Colt pistols originally owned by the first Crimson Avenger and used them to exact vengeance upon the unknown criminal. These guns are cursed, giving the Crimson Avenger an eternally bleeding bullet wound on her chest. Additionally, if Crimson Avenger uses the guns for revenge, they will track and kill those who have taken an innocent life.

== In other media ==
- The Lee Travis incarnation of Crimson Avenger makes non-speaking appearances in Justice League Unlimited. This version is a member of the Justice League.
- The Lee Travis incarnation of Crimson Avenger appears in a photograph in the Stargirl episode "Brainwave" as a member of the Seven Soldiers of Victory.
- The Lee Travis incarnation of Crimson Avenger appears in issue #33 of the Justice League Unlimited tie-in comic.
