= Greg Saunders =

American comic book character

Vigilante
- Greg Saunders as he appeared on the cover of Leading Comics #5 (December 1942). Art by Mort Meskin.

Publication information
- Publisher: DC Comics
- First appearance: Action Comics #42 (November 1941)
- Created by: Mort Weisinger; Mort Meskin

In-story information
- Alter ego: Greg Saunders
- Team affiliations: Seven Soldiers of Victory; All-Star Squadron; Justice League
- Partnerships: Stuff the Chinatown Kid
- Abilities: Brilliant marksman; Superb hand-to-hand combatant; Master of the lariat; Excellent horseman; Expert pilot; Superhuman agility

Greg Saunders is a superhero appearing in American comic books published by DC Comics. He is the first DC character to bear the name Vigilante.

The character made his live-action debut in the film serial The Vigilante (1947), played by Ralph Byrd.

== Publication history ==
Created by writer Mort Weisinger and artist Mort Meskin, Greg Saunders first appeared in Action Comics #42 (November 1941). He appeared in every issue of Action Comics until #198 (November 1954).

== Fictional character biography ==
The original Vigilante was a western-themed hero who debuted in Action Comics #42 (November 1941): originally named Greg Sanders, the spelling was changed to Greg Saunders in the 1990s. Grandson of a Native American fighter, and the son of a sheriff in Wyoming, Saunders, as a young man, moved east to New York City and became a country singer, radio's "Prairie Troubadour". Greg returned to his home after his father was killed, bringing to justice the gang of bandits who killed him.

The Vigilante, like many heroes of the era, acquired a sidekick to aid him in his crime fighting. Stuff the Chinatown Kid was introduced in Action Comics #45. He assisted the Vigilante when a Japanese spy, known as the Head, framed Stuff's grandfather for provoking a Tong war.

The majority of the Vigilante's solo adventures were against non-powered, costumed criminals. He was an excellent brawler, trick shooter, sharpshooter, horseman/motorcycle rider, and an expert with the lariat. These skills gave him advantage over his adversaries in his adventures, which centered primarily in NYC.

The Vigilante fought few foes that could be considered real "super-villains". His arch-foes were Dummy, a brilliant weapons inventor and professional killer who resembled a ventriloquist's dummy in both size and facial features, and the Rainbow Man, who committed crimes with a color motif. The Vigilante also encountered the Rattler on several occasions, as well as the Fiddler and the Shade, though the latter two villains are not the same foes that battled the Flash. Other foes included Shakes the Underworld Poet and Dictionary, a gangster with a heightened vocabulary.

The Vigilante was also a member of the Seven Soldiers of Victory (also known as the Law's Legionnaires), one of the earliest super-hero teams (appearing in Leading Comics). In these adventures, his sidekick Stuff never appeared, being replaced by an old, somewhat crotchety man named Billy Gunn. The Vigilante was also one of the few super-hero features to survive the end of the "Golden Age" of super-hero comics, lasting as a solo feature until Action Comics #198 (1954), when he was replaced by Tommy Tomorrow.

The Vigilante was revived during the "Bronze Age" in the pages of Justice League of America, when the Seven Soldiers of Victory were brought back into active continuity. Like Green Arrow, he was a lost member of the Seven Soldiers, but he did not participate in the JLA/JSA quest to rescue them. All the members were hurled through time after defeating Nebula Man.

Green Arrow, Black Canary, Johnny Thunder, and Thunderbolt saved Vigilante from a tribe of Native Americans in the Old West who felt that eventually the white men would take over their land. The Earth-1 Vigilante's contact with the League was limited to a two-part story where he aided the JLA against aliens determined to over-pollute the Earth. He remarks in his first appearance in Adventure Comics that the League did help him re-establish his career, even providing him with a new motorcycle. He also received a periodic feature in the pages of Adventure Comics, drawn by Mike Sekowsky and Gray Morrow, and also in World's Finest Comics.

The short-lived series in World's Finest culminated in the Vigilante coming to Gotham City to meet his old partner Stuff, only to find his friend murdered by his old enemy, the Dummy. At the end of the series, Vigilante rides off with Stuff's son.

Vigilante continued to sporadically appear as a superhero in DC Comics, having been established as running a dude ranch in Mesa City (the former home of Western hero Johnny Thunder).

=== Seven Soldiers ===
In Grant Morrison's Seven Soldiers #0, the Vigilante establishes a new Seven Soldiers of Victory to battle the monstrous spider of Miracle Mesa. He is apparently killed alongside the rest of the team, only to re-appear as a ghost in Bulleteer #3 (also part of the Seven Soldiers series). He attempts to recruit a new team of seven to combat the Sheeda. He claims Bulleteer's actions will allow him to 'rest'.

=== Return ===
In Superman's Pal Jimmy Olsen Greg Saunders appears, alive, as the sheriff of Warpath, a town on the Mexican border formerly known for supervillain activity. Jimmy Olsen's narration notes that Saunders has been dead and came back to life but does not go into detail. Olsen also notes that Saunders appears younger, though he retains his past experiences. Saunders and Guardian beat back a villainous invasion from Mexico.

=== The New 52 ===
In 2011, "The New 52" rebooted the DC Universe. Vigilante was renamed to Greg Sanders and operated in Opal City during the mid-20th Century. Shade contacted him to help rescue his great-grandson Darnell Caldecotte from Nazi spies. Afterward, Shade upheld his deal with Vigilante by giving him the intel on the local gangs and they parted ways.

== Powers and abilities ==
The Vigilante is a superb hand-to-hand combatant and martial artist, a brilliant marksman, and a master of the lariat. He typically avoids using deadly force, preferring using his revolver to disarm his enemies and his lasso to bind foes. Despite lacking a horse, he possesses a trusty steed in the form of a motorcycle; he has also been occasionally known to pilot aircraft.

== Enemies ==
Vigilante had his own rogue's gallery:

- Dummy - A skilled inventor who poses as a ventriloquist's dummy. He made his debut in Leading Comics #1 being among the criminals responsible for the origin of the Seven Soldiers of Victory.
- Fiddler - Benjamin Bowe is a man who uses trick violins that either shot poison arrows, sprayed acid, or was loaded with TNT. He fought Vigilante in seven issues of Action Comics.
  - Droop, Sailor, and Sport - A trio of henchmen working for the Fiddler. Droop was a short criminal, Sailor dressed in sailor clothes and always spoke in nautical terms, and Sport always dressed in fancy sporting clothes. They worked for the Fiddler in all the Fiddler's stories, except for Fiddler's last story, where he was instead assisted by Dictionary and Shakes.
- Head - An Asian-American criminal who poses as a spirit to other criminals.
- Killer Kelly - Vigilante's first opponent who faked his execution by electric chair.
- King - The leader of a gang who was after the gold that was found in Avalanche Junction, Wyoming.
- Lash - A whip-wielding criminal in a wheelchair, but at the end of his first story he revealed the wheelchair "was only a trick to fool the cops". Later, the Dummy hired a shadowy, whip-wielding criminal named the Lash, who may or may not have been the same character, to assist him while the Dummy was falsely pretending to go straight.
- Mr. Mungo - A criminal who caused accidents at the winter festival.
- Rainbow Man - A rainbow-themed criminal, he fought Vigilante in 12 issues of Action Comics.
  - Dictionary - A henchman who uses big words in his speech.
  - Shakes - His name short for "Shakespeare", a criminal who would rhyme all the time.
- Scorpion - A criminal who specializes in robbing charity events.
- Shade - Keyhole Carter is a radio announcer who also works as a criminal mastermind. He fought Vigilante twice.

== Other versions ==
Two multiversal incarnations of Greg Saunders / Vigilante from Earth-1 and Earth-2 appear in Justice League of America #78.

== In other media ==
=== Television ===
Greg Saunders / Vigilante as he appears in Justice League Unlimited.

- Vigilante appears in Justice League Unlimited, voiced briefly by an uncredited Michael Rosenbaum and primarily by Nathan Fillion. This version is a member of the Justice League who utilizes a horse-shaped hoverbike and technologically advanced revolvers.
- Vigilante appears in Batman: The Brave and the Bold, voiced by John DiMaggio.
- Vigilante appears in a picture depicted in the Stargirl episode "Brainwave" as a member of the Seven Soldiers of Victory.

=== Film ===
- Vigilante appears in a self-titled film serial, portrayed by Ralph Byrd.
- Vigilante makes a non-speaking cameo appearance in Justice League: The New Frontier.
