= Justice League Unlimited =

American animated television series

- Genre: Action; Adventure; Crossover; Drama; Science fantasy; Superhero
- Based on: Justice League by Gardner Fox
- Developed by: Bruce Timm
- Showrunner: Bruce Timm
- Directed by: Joaquim Dos Santos; Dan Riba; Andrea Romano (voice director)
- Voices of: Kevin Conroy; George Newbern; Susan Eisenberg; Phil LaMarr; Michael Rosenbaum; Carl Lumbly; Maria Canals
- Theme music composer: Michael McCuistion
- Composers: Kristopher Carter; Michael McCuistion; Lolita Ritmanis
- Country of origin: United States
- Original language: English
- No. of seasons: 3
- No. of episodes: 39 (list of episodes)

Production
- Executive producer: Sander Schwartz
- Producers: Dwayne McDuffie; Bruce Timm; James Tucker
- Editor: Joe Gall
- Running time: 21–23 minutes
- Production companies: DC Comics (season 3); Warner Bros. Animation

Original release
- Network: Cartoon Network
- Release: July 31, 2004 – May 13, 2006

Related
- Justice League

Justice League Unlimited (JLU) is an American animated superhero television series produced by Warner Bros. Animation with DC Comics (in season 3) and airing on Cartoon Network. Featuring a wide array of superheroes from the DC Universe, and specifically based on the Justice League superhero team, it is a direct sequel to the previous Justice League animated series and picks up around two years after it. JLU debuted on July 31, 2004, on Toonami and ended on May 13, 2006.

It is the eighth and final series of the DC Animated Universe, serving as the conclusion to a shared universe which began with Batman: The Animated Series. Notably, it is the most continuity-heavy show of the DC Animated Universe, and weaves together characters and plot lines from past series. Justice League Unlimited received critical acclaim.

== Overview ==
According to producer Bruce Timm, the series finale of Justice League, "Starcrossed", was possibly meant to be the final episode of the series; however, Cartoon Network ordered the production of season 3 and 4. The network wanted the show to be rebranded, including changing the episode format, so instead of two-part episode stories, the standard half an hour format was used. Additionally, alongside the name change, the show features a greatly expanded League, in which the characters from the original series—now referred to as "founding members"—are joined by many other superheroes from the DC Universe; in the first episode, well over 50 characters appear. A number of these were heroes who had made guest appearances in Justice League, but many heroes and other characters made their first animated appearances in this series. The general format of each episode is to have a small team assemble to deal with a particular situation, with a focus on both action and character interaction. This extension of the Justice League was originally planned to be explained in a planned direct-to-video feature film, but the project never materialized.

=== Production ===
Justice League Unlimited features both episodic and serialized episodes, the first major overarching story arc involves the growing conflict between the League and a secret government agency known as Project Cadmus. This plot line builds upon events that occurred during the second season of Justice League (which in turn built upon events in Batman: The Animated Series, Superman: The Animated Series, Batman Beyond, Static Shock, and The Zeta Project), and would go on to affect the plotlines of most of its episodes. It was resolved in a four-part story at the end of the second season of Justice League Unlimited.

The third and final season story arc focuses on the new Secret Society, a loose-knit organization formed to combat the increased superhero coordination of the first season. Towards the end of the series, certain characters became off-limits to the show, particularly characters associated with Batman, were restricted due to the unrelated animated series The Batman and Christopher Nolan's live-action The Dark Knight Trilogy, to avoid continuity confusion, thus leading to the popular term known as "Bat-embargo". Aquaman and related characters were unavailable due to the development of a pilot for a live-action series featuring the character as a young man (planned to be a spin-off of Smallville). To compensate for this, the last season focused their stories on previously overlooked DC Comics characters and mythos. These included characters like Deadman, Viking Prince, and Warlord.

The series, along with the entire DC Animated Universe, was originally planned to end after the second-season finale "Epilogue", which concluded the story of Batman Beyond and thus the entire DCAU chronologically. But a third season was greenlit by Cartoon Network. The third season started in 2005 with the episode "I Am Legion" (which was written before the announcement of a third season) and ended in 2006 with the episode "Destroyer". Stan Berkowitz, a member of the production team, left the show later for the TV series Friends and Heroes, and writer Matt Wayne was contracted to replace him. According to Wayne, if the show had been renewed for a fourth season, he would have liked to write more episodes focusing on Superman and Wonder Woman.

DC Comics created an ongoing monthly comic book series based on the TV series, as part of its Johnny DC line of "all ages" comics, which did not have the same restrictions regarding character appearances.

Justice League Unlimited, like the second season of Justice League, is animated in widescreen. The show also features new theme music and intro (nominated for an Emmy). The two-part series finale was aired in the UK on February 8 and 18, 2006, and in the United States on May 6 and 13, 2006.

== Episodes ==
Season	Episodes	Originally released	
Season	Episodes	First released	Last released
1	13	July 31, 2004	January 29, 2005
2	13	February 5, 2005	July 23, 2005
3	13	September 17, 2005	May 13, 2006

== Cast ==
=== Protagonists ===
Voice actor	Role
George Newbern	Superman / Clark Kent
Kevin Conroy	Batman / Bruce Wayne
Phil LaMarr	Green Lantern / John Stewart
Carl Lumbly	Martian Manhunter / J'onn J'onzz
Susan Eisenberg	Wonder Woman / Diana
Michael Rosenbaum	Flash / Wally West
Maria Canals-Barrera	Hawkgirl / Shayera Hol

=== Supporting cast ===
Voice actor	Role
Nicholle Tom	Supergirl
Kin Shriner	Green Arrow
Jeffrey Combs	Question
Amy Acker	Huntress
Oded Fehr	Doctor Fate
Scott Rummell	Aquaman
Michael T. Weiss	Etrigan / Jason Blood
Morena Baccarin	Black Canary
Dana Delany	Lois Lane
Will Friedle	Terry McGinnis / Batman, Green Lantern (Kyle Rayner)
Farrah Forke	Big Barda
Peter Onorati	Warhawk, B'wana Beast
Lauren Tom	Dana Tan, Green Lantern (Kai-Ro), Doctor Light
Michael Beach	Mister Terrific
Giselle Loren	Stargirl
Chris Cox	Captain Atom, Shining Knight
Jeremy Piven	Elongated Man
Gina Torres	Vixen
John C. McGinley	Atom
Tom Everett Scott	Booster Gold
Ioan Gruffudd	Mister Miracle
Christopher McDonald	Jor-El
Robert Picardo	Amazo
Jennifer Hale	Zatanna
Nathan Fillion	Vigilante
James Remar	Hawkman
Ron Perlman	Orion
Mike Erwin	Speedy
Scott Patterson	King Faraday
Jerry O'Connell	Captain Marvel
Gregg Rainwater	Long Shadow
Dennis Farina	Wildcat
Paul Guilfoyle	Warlord
Jonathan Joss	Pow Wow Smith
Raphael Sbarge	Deadman
Jason Hervey	Dove
Fred Savage	Hawk
Maria Canals-Barrera	Fire
Susan Sullivan	Hippolyta
Néstor Carbonell	El Diablo
Ben Browder	Bat Lash
Seymour Cassel	Chuck Sirianni
Matt Czuchry	Brainiac 5
Daniel Dae Kim	Metron
Dick Miller	Oberon
Kim Mai Guest	Linda Park

=== Antagonists ===
Voice actor	Role
Clancy Brown	Lex Luthor
Corey Burton	Brainiac, Key, Sonar, Weather Wizard
Powers Boothe	Gorilla Grodd
CCH Pounder	Amanda Waller
J. K. Simmons	General Wade Eiling, Mantis
Michael Ironside	Darkseid
Michael Dorn	Kalibak
Ed Asner	Granny Goodness
Malcolm McDowell	Metallo
Bud Cort	Toyman
Robert Foxworth	Professor Hamilton
Olivia d'Abo	Morgaine Le Fey
Armin Shimerman	Professor Milo
Donal Gibson	Captain Boomerang
Alexis Denisof	Mirror Master
Alan Rachins	Clock King
Mark Hamill	Trickster
Charles Napier	General Hardcastle
Lisa Edelstein	Mercy Graves,
Robert Englund	Felix Faust
Ted Levine	Sinestro
Peter MacNicol	Chronos
James Remar	Shadow Thief
Sheryl Lee Ralph	Cheetah
Michael Jai White	Doomsday
Robin Atkin Downes	Gentleman Ghost
Douglas Dunning	Deimos
Rachel York	Circe
Michael York	Ares
Virginia Madsen	Roulette
Héctor Elizondo	Hath-Set
Lex Lang	Atomic Skull, Captain Cold, Heat Wave
Don Harvey	Chucko
Melissa Joan Hart	Dee Dee
Michael Rosenbaum	Ghoul
Adam Baldwin	Rick Flag, Bonk
Juliet Landau	Plastique, Tala
Jennifer Hale	Giganta, Killer Frost
Hynden Walch	Ace
Bob Joles	Hades
Glenn Shadix	Steven Mandragora
Michael Beach	Devil Ray
Arte Johnson	Virman Vundabar

== Reception ==
Justice League Unlimited received critical acclaim and is listed as one of the best animated television shows of all time. IGN named Justice League/Justice League Unlimited as the 20th best animated television series of all time. Similarly, IndieWire also ranked the series as the 20th best animated show of all time. James Whitbrook, editor of io9, wrote "Justice League Unlimited is simply the greatest superhero show of all time", further stating "it embraced its source material wholly, and was unafraid to be the wildest, biggest, comic-book-iest show it could be." Producer Bruce Timm has stated that amongst all the shows he has worked on, this show is his favorite.

== Accolades ==
Year	Award	Category	Nominee	Result	Ref.
2005	Primetime Emmy Awards	Outstanding Main Title Theme Music	Michael McCuistion	Nominated	

== Home media ==
From 2006 to 2007, Warner Home Video (via DC Entertainment and Warner Bros. Family Entertainment) released the entire series of Justice League Unlimited on DVD. The series is presented in original broadcast presentation and story arc continuity order. The series was also released on Blu-ray.

Name	Release date	Ep #	Notes
Season One	October 24, 2006	26	4 DVDs. Contains all episodes of Seasons One and Two from the original airing. Featurette: And Justice for All: The Process of Revamping the Series with New Characters and a New Creative Direction, Themes of Justice: Choose Your Favorite JLU Musical Theme Audio Tracks, Creators' Commentary on "This Little Piggy" and 'The Return.” Episode 21 – "Hunter's Moon (AKA Mystery in Space)" – is placed out of order between episodes 22 ("Question Authority") and episode 23 ("Flashpoint").
Season Two	March 20, 2007	13	2 DVDs. Actually Season Three from the original airing. Cadmus: Exposed: Mark Hamill and the Series Creative Personnel Discuss This Popular Series Story Arc, Justice League Chronicles: Series Writers, Producers and Directors Discuss Their Favorite Moments Among Final Season Episodes, Music-Only Audio Track for the Final Episode Destroyer.
Justice League: 3-Pack Fun	July 19, 2011	11	3 DVDs. Contains "For The Man Who Has Everything," "The Return," and "The Greatest Story Never Told," as well as the two-part Justice League stories "The Brave and the Bold" and "Injustice For All,” and the Young Justice episodes "Independence Day," "Fireworks," "Welcome To Happy Harbor," and "Drop Zone.”
The Complete Series	November 10, 2015	39	3 Blu-ray discs. Featurette: And Justice for All: The Process of Revamping the Series with New Characters and a New Creative Direction, Creators' Commentary on "This Little Piggy" and 'The Return,” Cadmus: Exposed: Mark Hamill and the Series Creative Personnel Discuss This Popular Series Story Arc, Justice League Chronicles: Series Writers, Producers and Directors Discuss Their Favorite Moments Among Final Season Episodes. Episodes are shown in the correct order.

Warner Home Video also released another DVD set titled Justice League: The Complete Series. It contained all 91 episodes of Justice League and Justice League Unlimited on a 15-disc set with the 15th disc containing a bonus documentary. The same episodes were later sold as a 10-disc set without the bonus documentary.

=== Streaming ===
In September 2018, Justice League Unlimited and its predecessor series Justice League was made available for streaming online on the DC Universe streaming service that lasted until January 2021, when it was replaced by DC Universe Infinite (for digital comics only), with video content (including the series) moved to HBO Max.

On March 1, 2026, Justice League Unlimited and its predecessor series Justice League was one of the 100 Warner Bros.-owned animated series that added to the Fox Corporation-owned FAST/AVOD streaming service Tubi.

== Soundtrack ==
La-La Land Records released a 4-disc Justice League soundtrack on July 29, 2016. A potential Justice League Unlimited soundtrack depends on how well the Justice League soundtrack sells.

== Adaptations ==
=== Justice League Unlimited ===
DC Comics published a series of 46-issue numbered comics based on the television series, between 2004 and 2008.

- Justice League Unlimited: Jam-Packed Action! (2005-09-28): Adaptation of episodes 'Initiation' and 'For the Man Who Has Everything'.

==== Compilations ====
- Justice League Unlimited Vol. 1: United They Stand (2005-05-18): Includes #1-5.
- Justice League Unlimited Vol. 2: World's Greatest Heroes (2006-04-19): Includes #6-10.
- Justice League Unlimited Vol. 3: Champions of Justice (2006-04-19): Includes #11-15.
- Justice League Unlimited: The Ties That Bind (2008-04-09): Includes #16-22.
- Justice League Unlimited: Heroes (2009-04-08): Includes #23-29.
- Justice League Unlimited: Galactic Justice (2020-08-25, ISBN 1-77950-673-2/ISBN 978-1-77950-673-3): Includes #4, 6, 18, 24, 34, 46.
- Justice League Unlimited: Time After Time (2020-11-03, ISBN 1-77950-724-0/ISBN 978-1-77950-724-2): Includes Adventures in the DC Universe #10, Justice League Adventures #28, 30, 34; Justice League Unlimited #9, 19.
- Justice League Unlimited: Girl Power (2021-07-06, ISBN 1-77951-015-2/ISBN 978-1-77951-015-0/EAN-5 50999): Includes Adventures in the DC Universe #6, 9; Justice League Adventures #4; Justice League Unlimited #20, 22, 35, 42; DC Super Hero Girls: Ghosting (preview). (Note: Publisher mislisted the book as including Adventures in the DC Universe #3-5; Justice League Unlimited #21, 36-41.)
- Justice League Unlimited: Hocus Pocus (2021-01-27, ISBN 1-77950-754-2/ISBN 978-177950-754-9): Includes #11, 14, 25, 33, 37, 40.
- DC Comics: Girls Unite!/DC Girls Unite (2021-11-02, ISBN 978-1-77951-362-5/EAN-5 53999): Includes Batman Adventures: Cat Got Your Tongue?, Supergirl Adventures: Girl of Steel, Batman Adventures: Batgirl A League of Her Own, Justice League Unlimited: Girl Power

=== Justice League Infinity ===
It is a sequel comic to Justice League Unlimited, written by James Tucker and J.M. DeMatteis with art by Ethen Beavers. 7 numbered issues were published by DC Comics between 2021 and 2022.

==== Compilations ====
- Justice League Infinity (2022-07-05): Includes #1-7.

== See also ==
- List of Justice League episodes
- Justice League: Worlds Collide, a canceled Justice League DTV feature.
