= John Davey (actor) =

American actor

- Davey in Shazam!, 1975
- Born: June 25, 1939 (age 87); Nevada, U.S.
- Occupation: Actor
- Years active: 1965–1987
- Children: Thomas Davey

John Davey (born June 25, 1939) is a retired American actor. He is best known for portraying Captain Marvel on the Shazam! television series in the mid-1970s after Jackson Bostwick was dismissed in the early part of the second season.

== Early life, family and education ==
Davey was raised in Winnemucca, Nevada, the only city in Humboldt County, Nevada. He graduated from Humboldt County High School in 1957.

== Career ==
Davey was in the US Marine Corps from September 3, 1957, to October 1961. He was also a heavyweight boxer, including work as a sparring partner for Joe Frazier.

Davey performed in numerous television series, including Perry Mason, The Rockford Files, and Max Headroom. Like many Hollywood actors, he would appear in minor roles as different characters in specific episodes of the same series; he appeared in The Rockford Files in six episodes over three years this way, and in four episodes of Barnaby Jones this way. He acted in many TV movies.

Davey's most prominent performances were in his leading role as the superhero character Captain Marvel on the television series Shazam!. The show was created and broadcast for a Saturday morning timeslot, which was typical for children's programming. Davey was the second actor to play the role on the series, replacing the original actor for the role, Jackson Bostwick .. As Captain Marvel, Davey appeared in three episodes of Isis, a companion TV series.

== Personal life ==
Davey has a son, Thomas Lilburn Davey (born on May 23, 1967), granddaughter (nameless), a grandson Kian Seiter, and granddaughter Kylee Rice.

== Screen roles ==
John Davey filmography
| Year | Title | Role | Notes |
|---|---|---|---|
| 1965 | Perry Mason | Football Player | Episode: "The Case of the 12th Wildcat" (uncredited) |
| 1970 | There Was a Crooked Man... | Riot Guard | Uncredited |
| 1971 | Night Gallery | McWhirter | Episode: "Death in the Family/The Merciful/Class of '99/Witches' Feast" (segment "Class of '99") |
| 1971–1972 | Ironside | Second Trainer / MP | Episodes: "The Savage Sentry", "Good Samaritan" |
| 1971–1972 | The F.B.I. | Truck Driver | Episode: "The Outcast", "Bitter Harbor" |
| 1972 | Mod Squad | Matty Ryun | Episode: "Sanctuary" |
| 1972 | Room 222 | Tom Halstead | Episode: "Mr. Wrong" |
| 1972 | They Only Kill Their Masters | Head Removalist | Uncredited |
| 1973 | Beg, Borrow, or Steal | Guard | TV movie |
| 1973 | The Odd Couple | Andreas | Episode: "The Odyssey Couple" |
| 1973–1974 | The Rookies | Roy / Jenks | Episodes: "The Old Neighborhood", "Life Robbery" |
| 1975 | Cannon | Danny Fairchild / Lieutenant Waley | Episodes: "The Iceman", "Perfect Fit for a Frame" |
| 1975 | S.W.A.T. | Novak | Episode: "Omega One (1975) |
| 1975 | Sky Heist | Deputy Freedman | TV movie |
| 1975–1976 | Isis | Captain Marvel | Episodes: "Now You See It...", "...And Now You Don't", "Funny Gal" |
| 1975–1976 | Shazam! | Captain Marvel | 11 episodes |
| 1976 | Black Sheep Squadron | Third Marine | Episode: "New Georgia on My Mind (1976) |
| 1977 | 3 Women | Dr. Norton | |
| 1977 | The Late Show | Sergeant Dayton | |
| 1977–1980 | Barnaby Jones | Officer Portland / Harry Towler / Tank Bronson / etc. | 5 episodes |
| 1977–1980 | The Rockford Files | Mechanic / Rudy / Cowboy / etc. | 6 episodes |
| 1978 | The Comedy Company | Cop | TV movie |
| 1979 | Goldie and the Boxer | Murphy | TV movie |
| 1979 | Institute for Revenge | I.F.R. Member | TV movie |
| 1981 | CHiPs | Communications Sergeant | Episode: "11–99: Officer Needs Help" (1981) |
| 1982 | Marian Rose White | Maxie | TV movie |
| 1983 | Deal of the Century | Pilot on Screen | |
| 1983 | Remington Steele | 'Blazin' Billy Flynn | Episode: "Steele Knuckles and Glass Jaws" (1983) |
| 1984 | Hawaiian Heat | Sergeant Elliot | Episode: pilot (Sept. 14, 1984) |
| 1984 | Whiz Kids | Driver | Episode: "Father's Day" (1984) |
| 1985 | J.O.E. and the Colonel | Wilson | TV movie |
| 1985 | Scarecrow and Mrs. King | | Episode: "Vigilante Mothers" (1985) |
| 1985 | The Boys Next Door | Watkins | |
| 1985 | The Twilight Zone | Officer | Episode: "Healer/Children's Zoo/Kentucky Rye" (segment "Kentucky Rye") |
| 1986 | A Fine Mess | Detective Horn | |
| 1987 | MacGyver | State Trooper | Episode: "Phoenix Under Siege" (1987) |
| 1987 | Max Headroom | | Episode: "Blipverts" (1987) |
