= Superman/Shazam: First Thunder =

2006 comic book mini-series

Publication information
- Publisher: DC Comics
- Schedule: Monthly
- Format: Limited series
- Genre: Superhero
- Publication date: November 2005 - February 2006
- No. of issues: 4
- Main character(s): Superman; Captain Marvel

Creative team
- Written by: Judd Winick
- Artist: Joshua Middleton
- Letterer: Nick Napolitano
- Colorist: Joshua Middleton
- Editor: Mike Carlin

Collected editions
- Superman/Shazam: First Thunder: ISBN 1-4012-0923-8

Superman/Shazam: First Thunder is a 2006 comic book mini-series published by DC Comics, written by Judd Winick, and illustrated by Joshua Middleton.

The narrative depicts the initial encounter between two DC superheroes, Superman and Shazam. In contrast to common perceptions, the mini-series illustrates how the superheroes swiftly become steadfast allies, each complementing the other's unique abilities.

== Plot ==
Set at the beginning of what the Wizard Shazam refers to as "the second age of the great heroes", following the debuts of the Man of Steel, Batman, and Captain Marvel, but preceding the arrival of Wonder Woman, the Flash, and Green Lantern, the story begins with Superman pursuing a group of criminals who have just robbed a museum in Metropolis and used magic against him. Upon arriving in Fawcett City, he finds Captain Marvel already engaged in combat with the same group of thieves. Together, Superman and Captain Marvel defeat a pair of monsters, with Superman impressed by Captain Marvel's ability to repel magic attacks that affect him. Captain Marvel, in turn, expresses envy for Superman's additional vision and breath-based powers. Following the battle, they take a break at Mount Everest, discussing their powers and professional lives as superheroes. Superman steers the conversation away from personal matters, emphasizing his preference to keep his two lives separate. Shazam acknowledges the sentiment but finds it disagreeable. Subsequently, they join forces to thwart the villains Lord Sabbac (whom the museum-robbing gang sought to summon) and Eclipso. In the end, Superman appreciates having an ally in Shazam, better equipped to handle supernatural adversaries.

In a separate subplot, Captain Marvel's nemesis, Dr. Thaddeus Sivana, contacts his business rival Lex Luthor for assistance in defeating Captain Marvel. In return for Sivana selling Luthor back shares of LexCorp he had secretly acquired, Luthor provides Sivana with Spec, a metahuman tracker-for-hire. Spec eventually discovers that Captain Marvel is the alter ego of 11-year-old Billy Batson. Learning this, Sivana sends armed hit men to the subway where Billy lives, with orders to kill him. Using the power of SHAZAM, Captain Marvel defeats his assailants, but in the crossfire, Billy's best friend, Scott Okum, is fatally wounded. Shazam rushes Scott to the hospital, but they are unable to save him.

When police are unable to extract information from one of the killers, a hired gun with no discernible identity, Captain Marvel intervenes, assaulting the suspect to force a confession. The killer reveals Doctor Sivana as the mastermind. Driven by vengeance, Captain Marvel confronts Sivana at his office, causing destruction but stopping short of killing him, despite anticipating further attacks.

Back in Metropolis, Clark Kent, after publishing an article on the Superman-Shazam encounter, learns of Shazam's actions in Fawcett City. He confronts Captain Marvel at Mount Everest, demanding an explanation. Shazam tearfully reveals his motivations, citing Scott as his best friend. Superman, dubious and accusatory, insists on an immediate explanation. Captain Marvel discloses his true identity, transforming back into Billy Batson using the power of SHAZAM, and asserts that being "Billy" might be too dangerous. Superman demands to know who gave Billy his powers.

Superman visits the Wizard, berating him for bestowing immense power and responsibility on an 11-year-old, asserting that boys his age should be concerned with "homework assignments and schoolyard crushes" rather than the threat of assassination. He argues that such destinies should be chosen by adults, emphasizing that Billy "is just a little boy!". The Wizard sadly notes that Billy is in need of guidance. Superman's demeanor softens, reflecting the gravity of the situation.

The scene shifts to Billy's new home, an abandoned apartment building, where Superman, as Clark Kent, pays a visit. Billy initially mistakes Kent for a representative of social services, but Kent reveals himself as Superman. Seated next to Billy, Kent discloses, "My real name is Clark", suggesting that Superman is willing to mentor Captain Marvel.

== Reception ==
The book received positive reviews. The Common Voice suggested that while "Superman/Shazam: First Thunder" may not become a graphic novel classic, fans will enjoy witnessing the collaboration between these legendary characters. Phillip Hayes of Paperback Reader gave the book an A−, describing it as one of the best Captain Marvel stories. Newsarama praised Winick for effectively highlighting the differences between the two heroes and commended Middleton's art for enhancing the story's impact.

== In other media ==
The series loosely inspired the 2010 film Superman/Shazam!: The Return of Black Adam.

== Collected editions ==
The series was compiled into a trade paperback: Superman/Shazam: First Thunder (128 pages, DC Comics, May 2006, ISBN 1-4012-0923-8, Titan Books, August 2006, ISBN 1-84576-296-7)
