= Michael Gray (actor) =

American actor (1951–2026)

- Gray in Shazam!, 1974
- Born: September 2, 1951; Chicago, Illinois, U.S.
- Died: October 16, 2026 (aged 75); Palm Desert, California, U.S.
- Occupations: Actor, voice actor
- Years active: 1969–2026
- Spouse: Stacy Benon (m. 1994)

Michael Gray (September 2, 1951 – October 16, 2026) was an American actor, known for his portrayal of Billy Batson in the 1970s television series Shazam!.

== Career ==
From 1972 to 1973, he appeared as Ronnie Collins in the first season of the NBC sitcom The Brian Keith Show, starring Brian Keith and Shelley Fabares. He also appeared as Marcia's boyfriend Jeff in a 1973 episode of The Brady Bunch. In 2015 and 2019, Gray made a voice appearance as a fictionalized version of himself in four episodes of the animated series Archer.

== Personal life and death ==
Gray owned a florist shop in West Hollywood, Los Angeles, with his wife, Stacy Benon. The store closed in the mid-2000s. He died in Palm Desert, California, on October 16, 2026, at the age of 75.

== Filmography ==
Year	Title	Role	Notes
1969	Room 222	Student in Pete's Class	Episode "Richie's Story"
1970	The Flying Nun	Young Man	Episode "When Generations Gap"
1970	Marcus Welby, M.D.	Taxi Driver	Episode "Brave on a Mountain Top"
1972	Bobby Jo and the Good Time Band	Brian	TV movie (unsold pilot)
1972	The Little People	Ronnie Collins	Recurring role (6 episodes)
1972	American Bandstand	Himself	Episode 15.42
1973	NBC Children's Theatre	Michael	Episode "Jennifer and Me"
1973	The Brady Bunch	Jeff	"Marcia Gets Creamed"
1973	Goober and the Ghost Chasers	Himself (voice role)	Episode "Aloha Ghost"
1974	Our Time	Buzzy Knight	
1974–1976	Shazam!	Billy Batson	Series regular (28 episodes)
1975	Dinah!	Himself	2 episodes
1999	VH-1 Where Are They Now?	Himself / Billy Batson	Episode "Superheroes"
2015–2019	Archer	TV's Michael Gray/Himself (voice role)	Recurring role (4 episodes)
2016	Surge of Power: Revenge of the Sequel	Will E. Bee	
2018	Comic Book Men	Himself	"The Mightiest of Mortals"
2019	Surge of Dawn	Will E. Bee	
2022	Heroes of Extinction	Thompson (voice)	
2023	Shazam! Fury of the Gods	Man on the Street	Cameo
