= Shazam! (TV series) =

Television series (1974–76)

- Also known as: The Shazam!/Isis Hour
- Genre: Superhero
- Based on: Captain Marvel by: Bill Parker; C. C. Beck
- Starring: Michael Gray; Les Tremayne; Jackson Bostwick; John Davey
- Voices of: Lou Scheimer; Norm Prescott; Adam West
- Country of origin: United States
- Original language: English
- No. of seasons: 3
- No. of episodes: 28

Production
- Executive producers: Norm Prescott; Lou Scheimer; Dick Rosenbloom
- Running time: 22 minutes
- Production companies: Filmation; DC Comics

Original release
- Network: CBS
- Release: September 7, 1974 – October 16, 1976

Related
- The Secrets of Isis

Shazam! is an American superhero television series that was produced for Saturday Mornings by Filmation (the studio's first non-animated series), based on the superhero Captain Marvel, now known as Shazam, of Fawcett Comics' comic book series Whiz Comics (now owned by DC Comics). The program starred Michael Gray as Billy Batson, a teenage boy who can transform into the superhero Captain Marvel, originally played by Jackson Bostwick and later by John Davey, by speaking the magic word "Shazam!" With his guardian "Mentor" (Les Tremayne), Billy travels the country in a 1973 Dodge Open Road motorhome, looking for injustices to resolve.

The show ran from 1974 to 1976 on CBS's Saturday morning lineup. From 1975 to 1977, it was half of The Shazam!/Isis Hour and included The Secrets of Isis, a series about an Ancient Egyptian superheroine resurrected in the body of a schoolteacher, as the second half.

== Format ==
The Mentor character, as played by Les Tremayne, was unique to the TV series and did not originate from the Shazam! comics. His background, and the origin of his relationship to Billy, were never explained.

In later issues of the 1970s Shazam! comics meant to tie-in with the TV show, Billy's Uncle Dudley grows a moustache, drives Billy around the country in an RV, and tells Billy that the Wizard Shazam chose him to be Billy's "mentor", essentially turning Dudley into the comic book version of Mentor. The Mentor character has not been used since, although Uncle Dudley is shown driving a similar RV in the 2010s animated series Justice League Action.

Neither Mary nor Freddy appeared in this series, although the three main members of the Marvel Family did appear together in new stories in the tie-in era comics.

After Shazam! was paired with The Secrets of Isis in 1975, Joanna Cameron, the star of Isis, appeared as Isis and her alter-ego Andrea Thomas on three episodes of Shazam!, and John Davey likewise appeared as Captain Marvel in three episodes of Isis.

Shazam! is one of the first Filmation productions to carry the trademark spinning executive producers' credit wheel ("Norm Prescott-Lou Scheimer") during the opening credits rather than the closing credits.

== Broadcast history ==
After its original network run, Shazam! was brought back for reruns from January 5 through August 30, 1980. A handful of episodes appeared on Nickelodeon/Nick@Nite’s sister network, TV Land infrequently throughout the 2000s, originally appearing on the "Ultimate Fan Hour" in early 2004 as part of the "TV Land Kitschen" late weekend night programming block. The series was available for streaming on the now defunct DC Universe streaming service.

== Episodes ==
Season	Episodes	Originally released	
Season	Episodes	First released	Last released
1	15	September 7, 1974	December 14, 1974
2	7	September 6, 1975	October 18, 1975
3	6	September 11, 1976	October 16, 1976

=== Season 1 (1974) ===
No. overall	No. in season	Title	Directed by	Written by	Original release date
1	1	"The Joy Riders"	Hollingsworth Morse	Len Janson, Chuck Menville	September 7, 1974
A young man must figure out what to do when his friends insist on stealing cars and going on joy rides. Moral: It is important to do what you know is right, and not get conned into doing something dumb just because somebody calls you names. It often takes more courage to do what is right rather than to go along with the crowd.
2	2	"The Brothers"	Hollingsworth Morse	Len Janson, Chuck Menville	September 14, 1974
Chad is a blind boy who is being overly-protected by his older brother, Danny. Chad feels so useless that he decides to run away, and when his brother goes after him, Danny gets bitten by a rattlesnake. Chad gains self-confidence after he is able to make it back to Billy and Mentor for help and lead them back to Danny. Moral: Everyone needs a helping hand. People with problems or handicaps can get along almost as well as any of us. All they need is a chance to gain self-confidence.
3	3	"Thou Shalt Not Kill"	Arthur H. Nadel	Marianne Mosner	September 21, 1974
When a woman dies leaving instructions in her will to destroy her horse, Beckett, her niece tries to stop it. Captain Marvel and Mentor must help her save the horse while working within the law. Moral: Today you saw how someone tried to solve their problem by breaking the law, instead of working within the law. It is important for us to remember that laws are made to help us, and that when they stop helping us, they can be changed, legally.
4	4	"The Lure of the Lost (Part 1 of 2)"	Arthur H. Nadel	Jim Ryan, Bill Danch	September 28, 1974
A woman is concerned about her brother, Gary, when he seems to have fallen in with the wrong crowd, in the form of a drug dealer named Brock. Billy and Mentor must help Gary break free of his connections with Brock. Moral: When you are faced with a problem that you do not feel you can handle, running away is not the answer. Try talking it over with somebody you can trust.
5	5	"The Road Back (Part 2 of 2)"	Arthur H. Nadel	Bill Danch, Jim Ryan	October 5, 1974
Continuing from where the previous episode left off, Gary and Mark are on their way to the D.A.'s office when Brock, the drug dealer, car-jacks the police car. Mark pretends to be on the good side, so that he can keep Brock informed as to what is going on. Moral: It is important to be responsible for what we say and what we do. It is easy to get dragged into doing what is wrong, but it is even harder to get out again.
6	6	"The Athlete"	Hollingsworth Morse	Bill Canning	October 12, 1974
Kellie has her mind set on being a part of the all-boys Varsity Team, but there are two boys who will do anything in order to get her off the team, perhaps even by planting test answers in her locker. Moral: Everyone should be given a chance to prove his or her abilities. Do not put someone down just because they are different from you. Do not put a girl down just because she is a girl. When a person's talents are wasted, it is a loss to all of us.
7	7	"The Treasure"	Robert Douglas	Bill Danch, Jim Ryan	October 19, 1974
Two men have been digging up Indian artifacts in the desert and selling them. An Indian chief and his grandson, Johnny, try to get them to stop, but are unsuccessful. Billy and Mentor offer their help to keep these priceless treasures where they belong. Moral: The desert and traditions of other people have much to teach us and must be preserved for future generations to see and to know.
8	8	"The Boy Who Said 'No'"	Hollingsworth Morse	Rik Vollaerts	October 26, 1974
Mentor is hit over the head and robbed. Young Larry Burns knows that it was Ron Craig who robbed Mentor, but is threatened that he had better keep quiet. Billy and Mentor know that Larry knows who the robber was, and when Ron is seen looking for Larry, it becomes obvious that Ron is the guilty person. Knowing he has been found out, Ron forces Larry's father to take him out of town on his helicopter. Moral: Some day you may see somebody do something wrong. If you do not know what to do about it, just remember that when a problem has you stumped, it is a good idea to talk with a grown-up you can trust. It could save you a lot of trouble in the long run!
9	9	"The Doom Buggy"	Robert Douglas	Jack Mendelsohn, Jack Kaplan	November 2, 1974
Don has dropped out of school to be a mechanic, but when he and Billy get lost in the desert, he sees that he does not know as much as he thought he did. Moral: If you close your mind to learning, sooner or later you are going to have it opened and be surprised at just how much you have shortchanged yourself. So if you ever think about dropping out of school, you are only hurting yourself.
10	10	"The Brain"	Hollingsworth Morse	Donald F. Glut	November 9, 1974
Jim "The Brain" Carter is a new kid in town and is having a tough time finding friends. He has been playing tricks on them in order to get them to like him. They also are put off by his incessant book-reading. Billy and Mentor suggest that Jim try to do things that the rest of the guys are interested in. Tough guy Greg decides to make Jimmy try something dangerous in order to prove that he is good enough to hang around them. When Greg is in danger, Jim uses Morse Code (learned from books) to call for help. Moral: We all want to be liked, but scary, daredevil stunts are not the way to go about it. If a person cannot like you for who you are, then maybe they are not worth having as a friend.
11	11	"Little Boy Lost"	Arthur H. Nadel	Arthur H. Nadel	November 16, 1974
Howard is a boy who has not spoken since his friend was almost killed. His father will not let him have a puppy, so he runs away. Billy finds Howard stuck on some rocks in high tide, and is able to call his father using a note found in the boy's pocket. On their way home, Howard and his father stop at an old ghost town, where a puppy has fallen down into a mine shaft. His father is soon stuck too while trying to save the pup. In order to save the dogs life, his father is forced to absorb the dogs mind and exchanges places with the pup. Howard is able to go find Billy and Mentor, and when his dad is saved, Howard is suddenly able to speak. Moral: If you do not communicate, you will never solve your problems, and the most important communication for all of us is with the ones we love. Remember, there are times when everyone needs help, even you.
12	12	"The Delinquent"	Robert P. Chenault	Marianne Mosner	November 23, 1974
Norm is a loner attending an outdoor summer camp. Although he cannot swim, he decides to take a canoe ride. His canoe capsizes and he begins to call for help. Billy and Mentor are camping nearby and hear the cries for help. Billy transforms into Captain Marvel and saves Norm. Billy then learns about Norm from the camp counselor and decides to help. Billy must teach him to believe in himself. Moral: Before we can like others, we must first like ourselves.
13	13	"The Braggart"	Arthur H. Nadel	Len Janson, Chuck Menville	November 30, 1974
After Alan tells a story about beating up a big guy using karate, his friends start to doubt that anything he has been telling them is true. Alan makes a big mistake and says that he has been inside the rhino exhibit at the zoo, and now he has to prove it, otherwise he has to find some new friends. Moral: Honesty is the best policy. Note: Frank Coghlan, Jr., a.k.a. Junior Coghlan from the 1941 Republic serial Adventures of Captain Marvel, makes a cameo as a zoo employee.
14	14	"The Past Is Not Forever (Part 1 of 2)"	Robert Douglas	Paolo Orsini	December 7, 1974
Poor Jackie is being accused of robbing the gas station he works at because he has a criminal record, plus it was done using the keys. Tough guy Vinnie does not want Jackie hanging around his sister, Mellie. Moral: Making one mistake is not the end of the world. We often get a second chance. Just make sure you do not mess it up, or let others mess it up for you.
15	15	"The Gang's All Here (Part 2 of 2)"	Robert Douglas	Paolo Orsini	December 14, 1974
Vinnie is out on bail and ready to get even with that rat-fink Jackie. Billy tries to talk to Vinnie, but ends up being bound and gagged. Vinnie and Jackie's confrontation at the oil refinery almost takes one of their lives. Moral: In the end, fighting does not prove anything. It makes more sense to work together, and iron out our differences in a constructive, rather than a destructive, way.

=== Season 2 (1975) ===
No. overall	No. in season	Title	Directed by	Written by	Original release date
16	1	"On Winning"	Hollingsworth Morse	Barry Greenfield, Frank Granville	September 6, 1975
Corky feels that he is no match for his big brother, whether it be motorcycling, fishing etc. He also feels that his dad does not care for him as much as his older brother. When Corky runs away and his dad is almost killed trying to find him, Corky realizes how much his dad loves him. Moral: Winning is not the important thing. What is important, is to do the very best you can. And a parent's love is a very special kind of love; it is so big, that no matter how many brothers or sisters you have, there is more than enough love for everyone.
17	2	"Debbie"	Arnold Laven	Michael Pressman	September 13, 1975
Debbie's parents have warned her not to ride with Tom on his motorcycle, because he is reckless. It is Billy's job to help Debbie to realize that when her parents do not let her do certain things, it is because they love her. Debbie realizes this when Tom and his buddy swipe a six-pack of beer from a gas station, and almost get mangled by a large truck. Moral: When a parent sets rules and regulations, it really is a form of expression of their love and concern. Sometimes the hardest thing for them to say is "No". But we can be sure that if they say "No", that most of the time there is a good reason for it. Note: This is the first televised episode with John Davey as Captain Marvel.
18	3	"Fool's Gold"	Hollingsworth Morse	Olga Palsson Simms	September 20, 1975
A group of boys have been harassing an old prospector, whom they see as a mean old man, but things change when one of the boys is hurt and the man lends a helping hand. Because they have been playing around in his mine, it caves in on the old prospector. Captain Marvel punches right through the rock to save him. In the end, the boys and the prospector become friends. Moral: There are some things even more precious than gold, things like respect and understanding. Respect means more than being polite. It means knowing we have learned from each other. There is a lot we can learn, if we only listen. Note: This is the last episode with Jackson Bostwick.
19	4	"Double Trouble"	Arnold Laven	Michael Sutton	September 27, 1975
Captain Marvel robs a gas station, but could be also an impostor in an incredibly realistic mask. A warrant is issued for Captain Marvel's arrest, and so the real Captain Marvel turns himself in. With Marvel in jail, the crooks decide to rob the Iverson Mine's payroll. Meanwhile, Mentor finds the crooks' mask, costume and cape, which proves Marvel's innocence. Moral: Respecting the law is just another way of saying that we respect each other. Laws have been made for the good of everyone, and when someone breaks the law, they are saying "I do not care about you". When you respect the law, you respect yourself. Note: From this point on, John Davey is Captain Marvel.
20	5	"Goodbye, Packy"	Arnold Laven	Bill Danch, Jim Ryan	October 4, 1975
Kathy's pet wolf, Packy, is getting too old to be held in captivity any longer. He is becoming wild and hard to control. When it comes time to turn him loose, Kathy takes Packy and runs away. Trouble ensues when they hide in a conveniently placed hot-air balloon. Moral: Having a pet carries responsibilities. Some animals are born to be free. To deprive them of that right is selfish, so we all must understand and respect the laws of nature...for our sake, as well as for our animal friends.
21	6	"Speak No Evil"	Arnold Laven	Arthur H. Nadel, Olga Simms	October 11, 1975
Three boys break into their school and accidentally start a fire. They get away before they are seen, but one of the boys' dogs is seen at the school. When the boy confesses, the two other boys find out and chase him into a dangerous electrical plant. Moral: Do not ever be afraid of being called a name. As long as you are sure what you're doing is right, there's no word...no name...that can harm you.
22	7	"The Odd Couple"	Hollingsworth Morse	Sid Morse	October 18, 1975
Dan is too proud to accept help from Captain Marvel when his airplane runs out of gas in the middle of nowhere. Dan learns that everybody needs help once in a while when a fierce forest fire breaks out, and Captain Marvel needs help from Isis in order to put it out. Guest starring Joanna Cameron as Isis. Moral: There are a lot of things we can do by ourselves, but it is kind of foolish and maybe even dangerous to try to do something when we do not know how.

=== Season 3 (1976) ===
No. overall	No. in season	Title	Directed by	Written by	Original release date
23	1	"The Contest"	Hollingsworth Morse	J. Michael Reaves	September 11, 1976
Glen steals the answer to a contest in which the winner gets a new motorcycle. Now the person who convinced him to cheat needs a big favor – the keys to a van which contains an experimental solar-powered gyroscope. Moral: Just about anything worthwhile has to be worked for and earned. If it is worth having, it is worth waiting for.
24	2	"Bitter Herbs"	John Peyser	Ray Goldstone	September 18, 1976
Yale is a teenage boy who wants to join a club called "the Overlanders". The leader of the club does not want Yale to join because he is Jewish, but soon the racist gets what he deserves when a mountain lion attacks him. Moral: It is not a person's race, religion or looks that is important. What is important is the person's character.
25	3	"Ripcord"	Henry J. Lange, Jr.	Arthur H. Nadel	September 25, 1976
Young Bill is a little too anxious to grow up. He wants to be a skydiver, just like his big brother Larry. Bill decides to pack Larry's parachute himself, without any help. Moral: Sometimes there are things that a kid wants to do but he is too young for. Be patient. We grow up a lot sooner than we think.
26	4	"Finders Keepers"	Hollingsworth Morse	Susan Dworski	October 2, 1976
When two girls find stolen money, they are kidnapped, along with Mentor, by the thieves. Captain Marvel calls on Isis to help him rescue them. Guest starring Joanna Cameron as Isis.
27	5	"The Sound of a Different Drummer"	John Peyser	Len Janson	October 9, 1976
Curtis is a black man who would rather play his violin than play baseball. "Whoever heard of a black violinist?" his friends exclaim. After pressure from the teammates to play baseball, Curtis runs away, and unknowingly ends up in the middle of a missile testing range. Guest starring Maury Wills. Moral: Treat others the same way you would like others to treat you. If you give respect, you will get it back.
28	6	"Out of Focus"	Hollingsworth Morse	Paolo Orsini	October 16, 1976
When two thieves think a young filmmaker named Jim may have caught their theft on film, they attempt to take his film from him. Jim does not want to turn the film over to the police, hoping to enter it in a film festival. Captain Marvel and Isis team up to help Jim understand that winning at any cost is wrong. Guest starring Joanna Cameron as Isis.

== Home media ==
The pilot episode, "The Joy Riders", was released as Warner Bros. Television Commemorative DVD Volume 8: Shazam, part of a promotional DVD series designed to promote 50 years of Warner Bros. Television and to promote other TV shows that were not yet released on DVD. It was included as a bonus disc with the release of the third season of Wonder Woman in 2005 in North America. Meanwhile, the rights to The Secrets of Isis remained with Filmation's successors Entertainment Rights, Classic Media, and DreamWorks Classics; that series was released on DVD in its entirety in 2007, including the three episodes featuring Captain Marvel.

On October 23, 2012, Warner Bros. released Shazam!—The Complete Series on DVD via the Warner Archive burn-on-demand service.

Warner Archive re-released the complete series in HD on a four-disc Blu-ray set on October 8, 2019. The new HD masters for Shazam! were created from restorations of the original Filmation 16 mm and 35 mm film elements by Warner Bros.' in-house post-production team.
