= Shazam (DC Comics) =

- Billy Batson in his normal and transformed state on the cover of Shazam! (2023) #5. Art by Dan Mora

Publication information
- Publisher: Fawcett Comics (1942–1953); DC Comics (1972–present)
- First appearance: Whiz Comics #2 (February 1940)
- Created by: Bill Parker; C. C. Beck

In-story information
- Alter ego: William Joseph "Billy" Batson
- Species: Human
- Team affiliations: Justice League; Justice Society of America; Justice League International; Marvel Family; Squadron of Justice; Teen Titans
- Partnerships: Wizard Shazam; Courtney Whitmore; Mary Marvel; Captain Marvel Jr. Tawky Tawny
- Notable aliases: Captain Thunder; World's Mightiest Mortal; King Shazam; Captain Shazam; Lightning Guy; Champion of Magic
- Abilities: By shouting the name "SHAZAM!", Billy is bestowed the powers of divine origin, primarily of Greek-Roman origin. These powers typically include: Superhuman physical attributes: strength, speed, durability, etc.; Enhanced intelligence and knowledge; Physical and magical invulnerability; Control over lightning and magic; Skilled hand-to-hand combatant and natural charisma makes him an apt radio personality.

Shazam (/ʃəˈzæm/), also known as Captain Marvel and The Captain, is a superhero appearing in American comic books originally published by Fawcett Comics and currently published by DC Comics. Artist C. C. Beck and writer Bill Parker created the character in 1939. Shazam first appeared in Whiz Comics #2 (cover-dated Feb. 1940), published by Fawcett Comics. Shazam is the alter-ego of William Joseph "Billy" Batson, a young boy who is granted magical powers by the Wizard by speaking the magic word "SHAZAM!", an acronym of six "immortal elders": Solomon, Hercules, Atlas, Zeus, Achilles, and Mercury, and transforms into a costumed adult superhero with various superpowers derived from specific attributes of the aforementioned elders.

The character battles evil in the form of an extensive rogues' gallery, most of them working in tandem as the Monster Society of Evil, including primary archenemies Black Adam, Doctor Sivana and Mister Mind. Billy often shares his powers with other children, primarily his sister Mary Batson and their best friend/foster brother Freddy Freeman, who also transform into superheroes and fight crime with Billy as members of the Marvel Family (also known as the Shazam Family or Shazamily). The character also serves as a notable member of several teams, including the Justice League and various other derivatives, Justice Society of America, and the Teen Titans.

Since the character's inception, Captain Marvel was once the most popular superhero of the 1940s, outselling even Superman. Captain Marvel was also the first comic book superhero to be adapted to film, in a 1941 Republic Pictures serial, Adventures of Captain Marvel, with Tom Tyler as Captain Marvel and Frank Coghlan, Jr. as Billy Batson. Fawcett ceased publishing Captain Marvel-related comics in 1953, partly because of a copyright infringement suit from DC Comics alleging that the character was a copy of Superman. In 1972, Fawcett licensed the character rights to DC, which by 1991 acquired all rights to the entire family of characters. DC has since integrated Captain Marvel and the Marvel Family into their DC Universe and has attempted to revive the property several times, with mixed success. Owing to trademark conflicts over other characters named "Captain Marvel" owned by Marvel Comics, DC has branded and marketed the character using the trademark Shazam! since his 1972 reintroduction. DC later renamed the mainline version of the character "Shazam" when relaunching its comic book properties in 2011, and his associates became the "Shazam Family" at this time as well.

DC's revival of Shazam! has been adapted twice for television by Filmation: as a live-action 1970s series with Jackson Bostwick and John Davey as Captain Marvel and Michael Gray as Billy Batson, and as an animated 1980s series. The 2019 New Line Cinema/Warner Bros. film Shazam!, an entry in the DC Extended Universe, stars Zachary Levi as Shazam and Asher Angel as Billy Batson. Levi and Angel returned in the sequel, Shazam! Fury of the Gods.

== Publication history ==
=== Development and inspirations ===
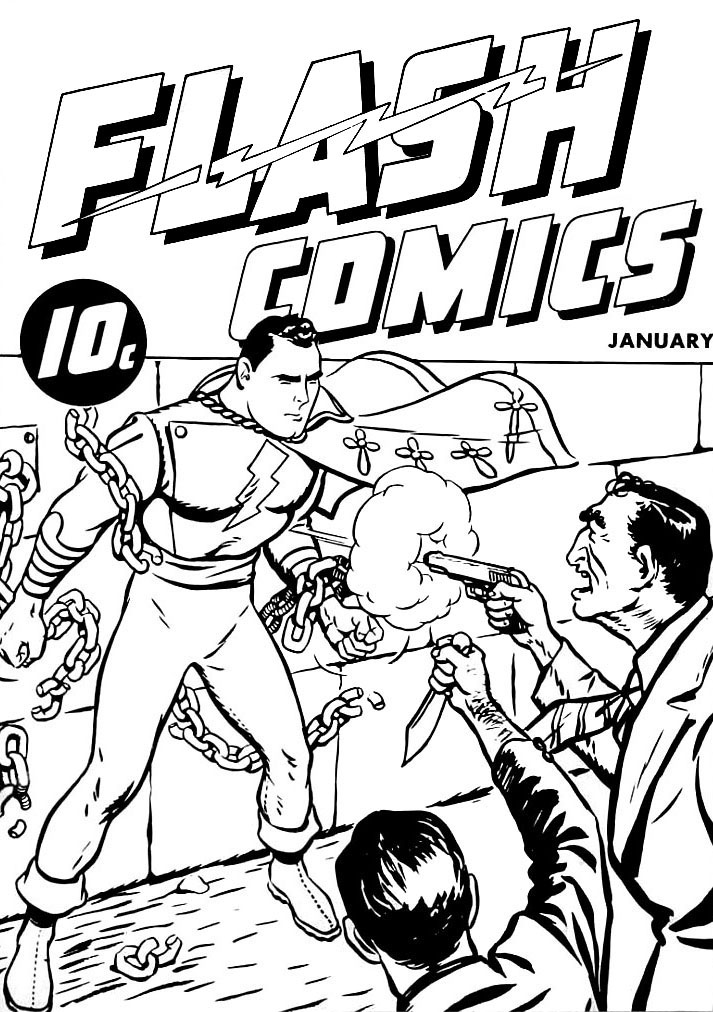
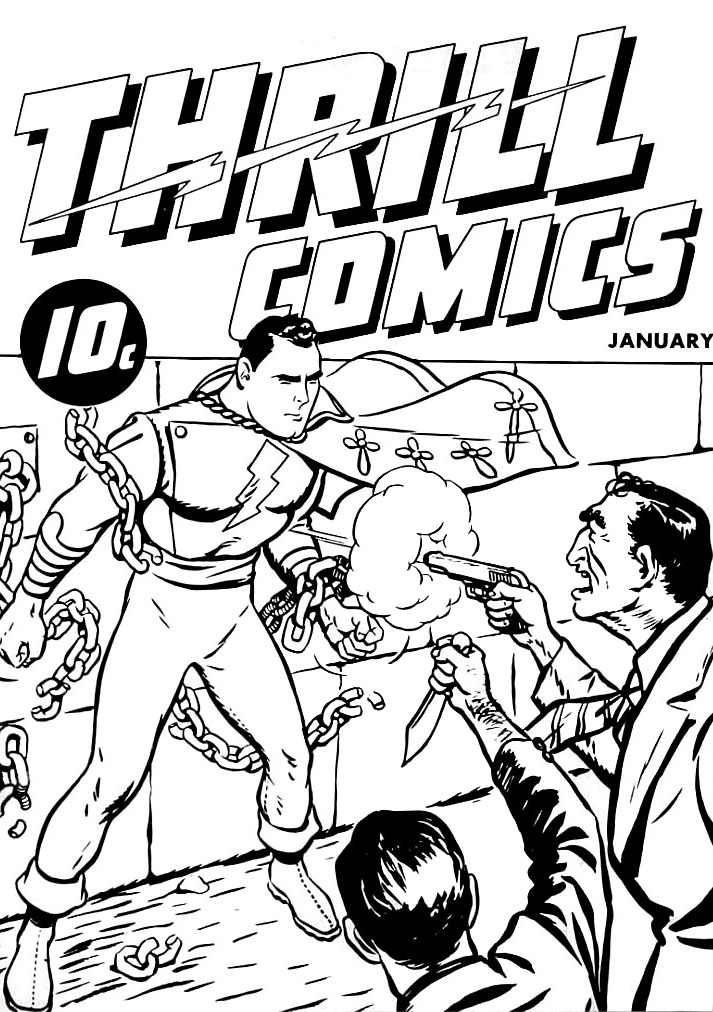
Covers of the ashcan copies for Flash Comics #1 and Thrill Comics #1, published by Fawcett Comics in November 1939. Art by C. C. Beck

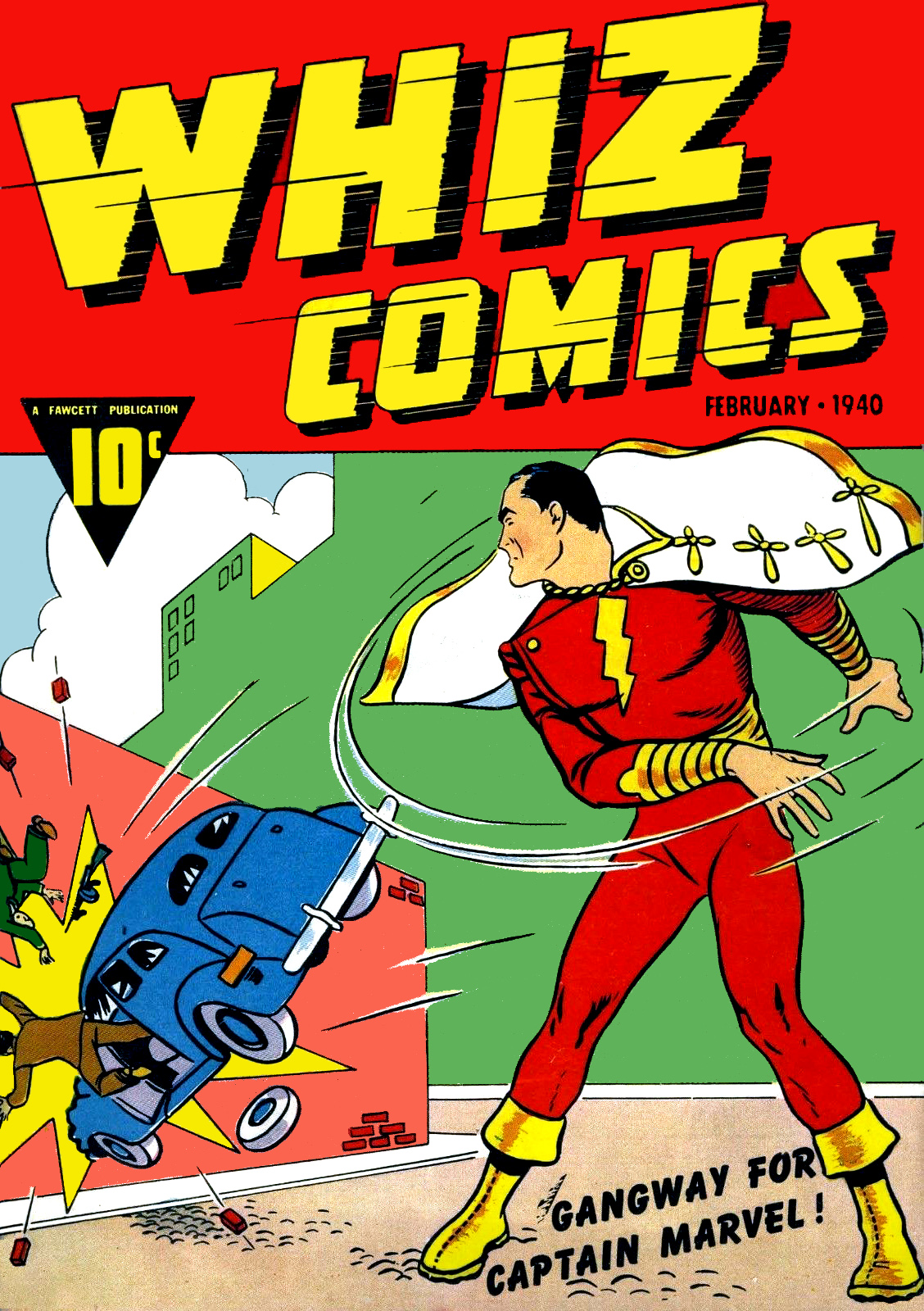
Captain Marvel first appeared in Whiz Comics #2 (Feb. 1940). Art by C. C. Beck

After the success of National Comics' new superhero characters Superman and Batman, Fawcett Publications started its own comics division in 1939, recruiting staff writer Bill Parker to create several hero characters for the first title in their line, tentatively titled Flash Comics. Besides penning stories featuring his creations Ibis the Invincible, the Spy Smasher, the Golden Arrow, Lance O'Casey, Scoop Smith, and Dan Dare for the new book, Parker also wrote a story about a team of six superheroes. Each superhero in this team possessed a special power granted to them by a mythological figure.

Fawcett Comics' executive director Ralph Daigh decided it would be best to combine the team of six into one hero who would embody all six powers. Parker responded by creating a character he called "Captain Thunder". Staff artist Charles Clarence "C. C." Beck was recruited to design and illustrate Parker's story, rendering it in a direct, somewhat cartoony style that became his trademark. "When Bill Parker and I went to work on Fawcett's first comic book in late 1939, we both saw how poorly written and illustrated the superhero comic books were," Beck told an interviewer. "We decided to give our reader a real comic book, drawn in comic-strip style and telling an imaginative story, based not on the hackneyed formulas of the pulp magazine, but going back to the old folk-tales and myths of classic times."

The first issue of the comic book, printed as both Flash Comics #1 and Thrill Comics #1, had a low print run in the fall of 1939 as an ashcan copy created for advertising and trademark purposes. Shortly after its printing, however, Fawcett found it could not trademark "Captain Thunder", "Flash Comics", or "Thrill Comics", because all three names were already in use. Consequently, the book was renamed Whiz Comics, and Fawcett artist Pete Costanza suggested changing Captain Thunder's name to "Captain Marvelous", which the editors shortened to "Captain Marvel". The word balloons in the story were re-lettered to label the hero of the main story as "Captain Marvel".

==== Introduction ====
Whiz Comics #2 (cover-dated Feb. 1940) was published in late 1939. Captain Marvel, the comic's lead feature, introduced audiences to Billy Batson, an orphaned 12-year-old boy who, by speaking the name of the ancient wizard Shazam, is struck by a magic lightning bolt and transformed into the adult superhero Captain Marvel. Shazam's name was an acronym derived from the six immortal elders who grant Captain Marvel his superpowers: Solomon, Hercules, Atlas, Zeus, Achilles, and Mercury.

In addition to introducing the main character, his alter ego, and his mentor, Captain Marvel's first adventure in Whiz Comics #2 also introduced his archenemy, the evil Doctor Sivana, and found Billy Batson talking his way into a job as an on-air radio reporter with station WHIZ. Captain Marvel was an instant success, with Whiz Comics #2 selling over 500,000 copies. By 1941, he had his own solo series, Captain Marvel Adventures, the premiere issue of which (cover-dated March 1941) was written and drawn by Joe Simon and Jack Kirby. Captain Marvel continued to appear in Whiz Comics, as well as periodic appearances in other Fawcett books, including Master Comics.

Captain Marvel's first appearance, Whiz Comics #2, did not have any copyright registration or renewal.

==== Inspiration and success at Fawcett ====
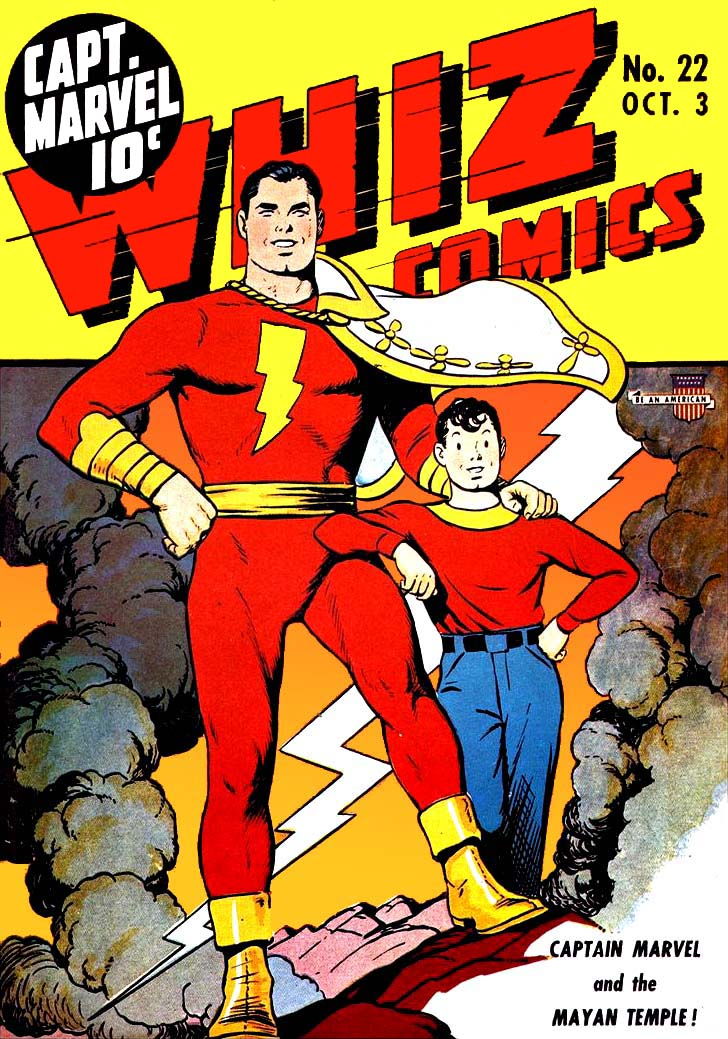
Whiz Comics #22 (Oct. 1941), featuring Captain Marvel and his young alter-ego, Billy Batson. Art by C. C. Beck

Inspiration for Captain Marvel came from a number of sources. His visual appearance was modeled after that of Fred MacMurray, a popular American actor of the period, though comparisons with both Cary Grant and Jack Oakie were made as well. Fawcett Publications' founder, Wilford H. Fawcett, was nicknamed "Captain Billy", which inspired the name "Billy Batson" as well as Marvel's title. Fawcett's earliest magazine was titled Captain Billy's Whiz Bang, which inspired the title Whiz Comics. In addition, Fawcett took several of the elements that had made Superman the first popular comic book superhero (super-strength and speed, science-fiction stories, a mild-mannered reporter alter ego) and incorporated them into Captain Marvel. Fawcett's circulation director Roscoe Kent Fawcett recalled telling the staff, "Give me a Superman, only have his other identity be a 10- or 12-year-old boy rather than a man."

Through much of the Golden Age of Comic Books, Captain Marvel proved to be the most popular superhero character of the medium, and his comics outsold all others. Captain Marvel Adventures sold fourteen million copies in 1944, and was at one point being published bi-weekly with a circulation of 1.3 million copies an issue. Several issues of Captain Marvel Adventures included a blurb on their covers proclaiming the series the "Largest Circulation of Any Comic Magazine".

The franchise was expanded to introduce spin-off characters to Captain Marvel between 1941 and 1942. Whiz Comics #21 (1941) introduced the Lieutenant Marvels: three other boys named "Billy Batson" who could also become adult superheroes. Captain Marvel Jr., the alter-ego of disabled newsboy Freddy Freeman, debuted in Whiz Comics #25 (1941). Mary Marvel, alter-ego of Billy's twin sister Mary Batson, first appeared in Captain Marvel Adventures #18 (1942). In contrast to Captain Marvel and the Lieutenants, both Mary Marvel and Captain Marvel Jr. remained kids in superhero form, and were given their own eponymous books in addition to appearing as the lead features in Master Comics and Wow Comics, respectively. Captain Marvel, Captain Marvel Jr., and Mary Marvel appeared together as a team in another Fawcett publication, The Marvel Family. In addition, there was a talking animal spin-off character, Hoppy the Marvel Bunny, which was created in 1942 for Fawcett's Funny Animals comic book and later given an eponymous series as well.

With Bill Parker having been drafted into World War II, chief writing duties on the Captain Marvel-related comics stories went to Otto Binder by 1942. C.C. Beck remained as lead artist, and he and Binder steered the Captain Marvel stories towards a whimsical tone that emphasized comedy and fantasy elements alongside the superhero action. Other artists associated with the Marvel Family at Fawcett included Pete Costanza, Mac Raboy, Marc Swayze, Kurt Schaffenberger, and Richard Deane Taylor. Binder would write over 900 of the approximately 1,790 Captain Marvel-related stories published by Fawcett. Binder created several of Captain Marvel's enduring supporting characters and enemies—including the non-powered Uncle Marvel, Tawky Tawny the talking tiger, and the villains Mister Mind and Black Adam—during the mid-to-late 1940s.

=== Copyright infringement lawsuit and cancellation ===
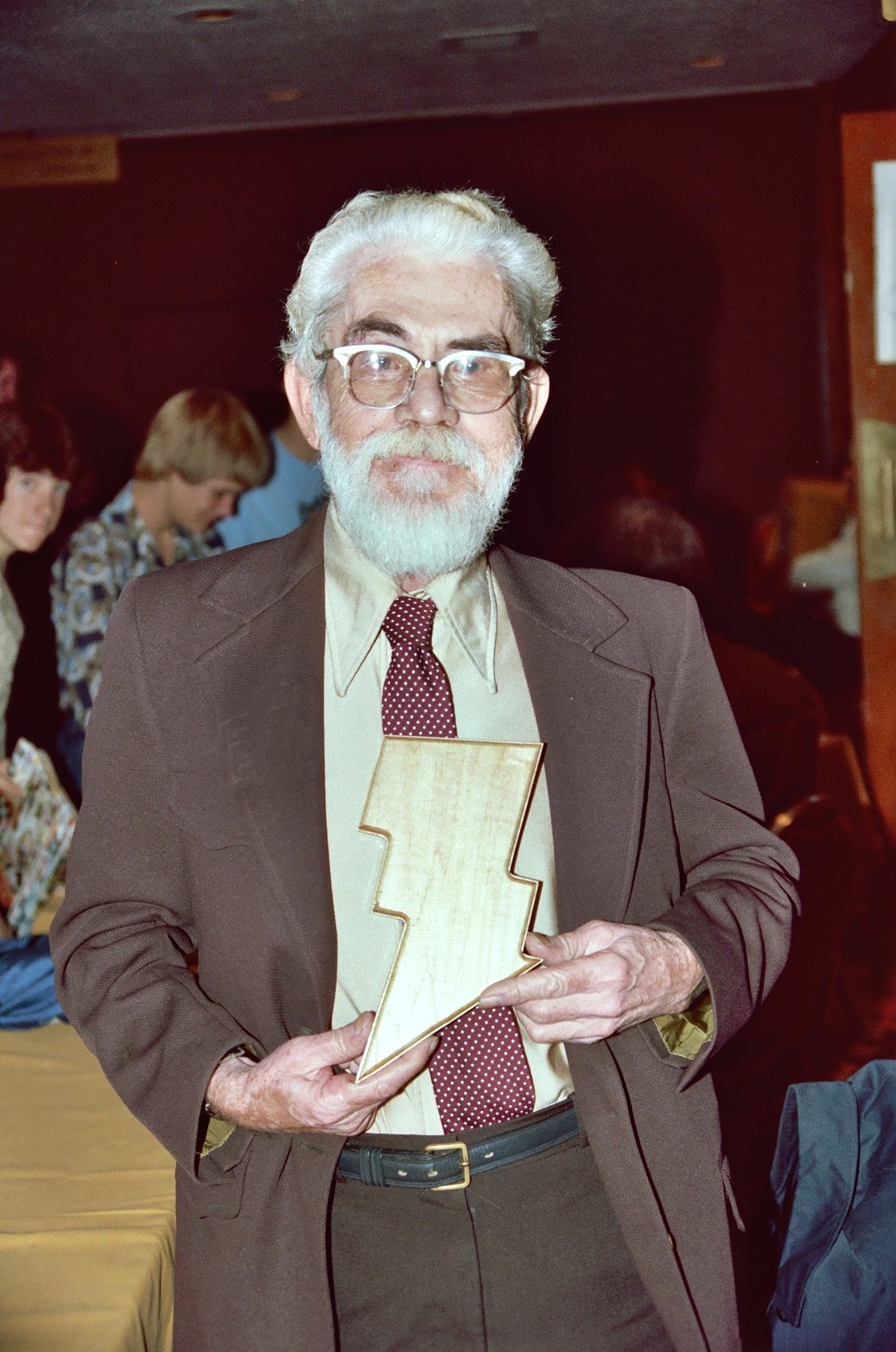
Captain Marvel co-creator C. C. Beck was the chief artist on the character throughout its Golden Age run at Fawcett, and illustrated stories for the first 10 issues of DC Comics' 1970s Shazam! revival series.

Detective Comics (later known as National Comics Publications, National Periodical Publications, and today known as DC Comics) sued both Fawcett Comics and Republic Pictures for copyright infringement in 1941, alleging that Captain Marvel was based on their character Superman. After seven years of litigation, National Comics Publications, Inc. v. Fawcett Publications, Inc. went to trial in 1948. Although the presiding judge decided that Captain Marvel was an infringement, DC was found to be negligent in copyrighting several of their Superman daily newspaper strips, and it was decided that National had abandoned the Superman copyright. As a result, the initial verdict, delivered in 1951, went in Fawcett's favor.

National appealed this decision, and Judge Learned Hand declared in 1952 that National's Superman copyright was in fact valid. Judge Hand did not find that the character of Captain Marvel itself was an infringement, but rather that specific stories or super feats could be infringements, and this would have to be determined in a retrial. He therefore sent the matter back to the lower court for final determination.

Instead of retrying the case, Fawcett settled with National out of court. The National lawsuit was not the only problem Fawcett faced in regard to Captain Marvel. While Captain Marvel Adventures had been the top-selling comic series during World War II, it suffered declining sales every year after 1945, and, by 1949, it was selling only half its wartime rate. Fawcett tried to revive the popularity of its Captain Marvel series in the early 1950s by introducing elements of the horror comics trend that had gained popularity at the time.

Feeling that this decline in the popularity of superhero comics meant that it was no longer worth continuing the fight, Fawcett agreed on August 14, 1953, to permanently cease publication of comics with the Captain Marvel-related characters and to pay National $400,000 in damages. Fawcett shut down its comics division in autumn 1953 and fired its comic book staff. Otto Binder and Kurt Schaffenberger ended up at DC, working in Superman-related comics from 1954 through the 1960s. Schaffenberger snuck an unauthorized cameo by Captain Marvel into a story in Superman's Girl Friend, Lois Lane #42 in 1963.

Whiz Comics had ended with issue #155 in June 1953, Captain Marvel Adventures was canceled with #150 in November 1953, and The Marvel Family ended its run with #89 in January 1954. Hoppy the Marvel Bunny was sold to Charlton Comics, where a few Fawcett-era stories from that strip were reprinted as Hoppy the Magic Bunny, with all references to "Captain Marvel" and "Shazam" removed.

=== Marvelman/Miracleman ===
In the 1950s, a small British publisher, L. Miller and Son, published a number of black-and-white reprints of American comic books, including the Captain Marvel series. With the outcome of the National v. Fawcett lawsuit, L. Miller and Son found their supply of Captain Marvel material abruptly cut off. They requested the help of a British comic writer, Mick Anglo, who created a thinly disguised version of the superhero called Marvelman. Captain Marvel Jr. was adapted to create Young Marvelman, while Mary Marvel had her sex changed to create the male Kid Marvelman. The magic word "Shazam!" was replaced with "Kimota" ("Atomik" spelled backwards). The new characters took over the numbering of the original Captain Marvel's United Kingdom series with issue number #25.

Marvelman ceased publication in 1963, but the character was revived in 1982 by writer Alan Moore in the pages of Warrior Magazine. Beginning in 1985, Moore's black-and-white serialized adventures were reprinted in color by Eclipse Comics under the new title Miracleman (as Marvel Comics objected to the use of "Marvel" in the title), and continued publication in the United States after Warrior's demise. Within the metatextual story line of the comic series itself, it was noted that Marvelman's creation was based upon Captain Marvel comics, by both Moore and later Marvelman/Miracleman writer Neil Gaiman. In 2009, Marvel Comics obtained the rights to the original 1950s Marvelman characters and stories, and later purchased the rights to the 1980s version and those reprints in 2013.

=== M. F. Enterprises ===
In 1966, M. F. Enterprises produced their own Captain Marvel: an android superhero from another planet whose main characteristic was the ability to split his body into several parts, each of which could move on its own. He triggered the separation by shouting "Split!" and reassembled himself by shouting "Xam!" He had a young human ward named Billy Baxton. This short-lived Captain Marvel was credited in the comic as being "based on a character created by Carl Burgos". Marvel Comics subsequently created their own character named Captain Marvel in 1967, and M.F. owner Myron Fass sued Marvel for trademark infringement. Fass accepted a $4,500 settlement from Marvel, and Marvel secured the trademark of the name.

=== Bill Black's attempted revival ===
Bill Black attempted to revive Captain Marvel in 1969, but written and drawn in a more realistic Marvel Comics style for his fanzine Paragon Golden Age Greats, Vol. 1, #2. However, on the legal advice of his friend and publishing mentor Martin L. Greim, he decided that rather than risk legal trouble with Fawcett Publications it would be better to destroy the entire print run except for two copies that he saved for his personal files. Black then rewrote the story using his own newly created hero Captain Paragon.

=== C.C. Beck and Rocket's Blast Comicollector ===
In 1970, fanzine Rocket's Blast Comicollector (RBCC) staffed C.C. Beck, Don Newton, Robert Kline, and Gene Arnold for a special issue called The Rocket's Blast Special 8. The comic book focuses on Captain Marvel's origins and creation through a series of columns by the group where they also discussed their history with Fawcett Publications. Along with new and exclusive art by Beck and Newton, the issue included an opinion piece by the staff strongly criticizing the copyright infringement lawsuit by Detective Comics. The opinion piece was titled THE DEMISE OF CAPTAIN MARVEL and is found on the very last page above where the staff still credits the copyright of Captain Marvel to Fawcett Publications.

=== DC Comics revival: Shazam! (1972–1978) ===
Shazam!
- Cover of Shazam! #1 (Feb. 1973), the first key appearance of Captain Marvel in a DC publication, and his first in 20 years following the cancellation of the Fawcett Comics line. Art by C. C. Beck with Nick Cardy and Murphy Anderson

Publication information
- Publisher: DC Comics
- Schedule: List: (vol. 1) Eight times a year: #1–11; Bimonthly: #12–21; 25–35 Quarterly: #22–24 (vol. 2) One-shot (vol. 3) Monthly (vol. 4) Monthly (vol. 5) Monthly
- Format: List: (vol. 1) Ongoing (vol. 2) One-shot (vol. 3) Ongoing (vol. 4) Limited (vol. 5) Ongoing
- Genre: List: (vol. 1) Superhero/Humor (vol. 2) Superhero (vol. 3) Superhero (vol. 4) Superhero (vol. 5) Superhero
- Publication date: List: (vol. 1) February 1973 – May–June 1978 (vol. 2) March 2011 (vol. 3) December 2018 – September 2020 (vol. 4) July 2021–October 2021 (vol. 5) May 2023–March 2025
- No. of issues: List: (vol. 1) 35 (vol. 2) 1 (vol. 3) 15 (vol. 4) 4 (vol. 5) 21
- Main character: List: (vol. 1) Captain Marvel Mary Marvel Captain Marvel Jr. Uncle Marvel Shazam Doctor Sivana Tawky Tawny Mister Mind (vol. 2) Shazam (Freddy Freeman) Mary Batson Billy Batson Blaze (vol. 3) Shazam (Billy Batson) Shazam Family (Mary, Freddy, Darla, Eugene, Pedro) Doctor Sivana Mister Mind Tawky Tawny C.C. Batson (vol. 4) The Captain (Billy Batson) (vol. 5) The Captain (Billy Batson) Marvel Family

Creative team
- Created by: Bill Parker; C.C. Beck
- Written by: List: (vol. 1) Dennis O'Neil Elliot S! Maggin E. Nelson Bridwell (vol. 2) Eric Wallace (vol. 3) Geoff Johns Jeff Loveness (vol. 4) Mark Waid (vol. 5) Mark Waid Dan Mora Josie Campbell
- Penciller: List: (vol. 1) C.C. Beck Bob Oksner Kurt Schaffenberger Don Newton (vol. 2) Cliff Richards (vol. 3) Dale Eaglesham Mayo "SEN" Naito Marco Santucci Scott Kolins Brandon Peterson (vol. 4) Dan Mora
- Inker: List: (vol. 1) C.C. Beck Bob Oksner Kurt Schaffenberger (vol. 2) Cliff Richards (vol. 3) Dale Eaglesham Mayo "SEN" Naito Marco Santucci Scott Kolins Brandon Peterson
- Colorist: List: (vol. 4) Alejandro Sánchez

When superhero comics became popular again in the mid-1960s in what is now called the "Silver Age of Comic Books", Fawcett was unable to revive Captain Marvel, having agreed to never publish the character again as part of their 1953 settlement. Looking for new properties to introduce to the DC Comics line, at the urging of Jack Kirby who recently defected from Marvel Comics, DC publisher Carmine Infantino decided to bring the Captain Marvel property back into print. On June 16, 1972, DC entered into an agreement with Fawcett to license the Captain Marvel and Marvel Family characters. Because Marvel Comics had by this time established Captain Marvel as a comic book trademark for their own character, created and first published in 1967, DC published their book under the name Shazam!. Infantino attempted to give the Shazam! book the subtitle The Original Captain Marvel, but a cease and desist letter from Marvel Comics forced them to change the subtitle to The World's Mightiest Mortal, starting with Shazam! #15 (December 1974). As all subsequent toys and other merchandise featuring the character have also been required to use the "Shazam!" label with little to no mention of the name "Captain Marvel", the title became so linked to Captain Marvel that many people took to identifying the character as "Shazam" instead of "Captain Marvel".

The Shazam! comic series began with Shazam! #1 (Feb. 1973). It contained both new stories and reprints from the 1940s and 1950s. Dennis O'Neil was the primary writer of the book. His role was later taken over by writers Elliot S. Maggin and E. Nelson Bridwell. C. C. Beck drew stories for the first 10 issues of the book before quitting because of creative differences. Bob Oksner and Fawcett alumnus Kurt Schaffenberger were among the later artists of the title. As per DC's agreement with Fawcett, DC paid Fawcett—and after 1977, its successor CBS Publications—a licensing fee per issue, per page for each of the Fawcett characters who appeared, either in Shazam! or crossovers in other comic series.

With DC's Multiverse concept in effect during this time, the revived Marvel Family and related characters lived within the DC Universe on the parallel world of "Earth-S". The Fawcett material was still considered canon, with the Marvel Family's 20-year layoff explained in the comic as time spent in suspended animation due to Doctor Sivana. While the series began with a great deal of fanfare, the book had a lackluster reception. The creators themselves had misgivings. Beck said, "As an illustrator, I could, in the old days, make a good story better by bringing it to life with drawings. But I couldn't bring the new [Captain Marvel] stories to life no matter how hard I tried".

Shazam! was heavily rewritten as of issue #34 (April 1978), and Bridwell provided more realistic stories, accompanied by similar art; the first issue was drawn by Alan Weiss and Joe Rubinstein, and thereafter by Don Newton, a longtime fan of the character, and Schaffenberger. Nevertheless, the next issue was the last one, though the feature was kept alive in a back-up position in the Dollar Comics-formatted run of World's Finest Comics (from #253, October/November 1978, to #282, August 1982, skipping only #271, which featured a full-length origin of the Superman-Batman team story). Schaffenberger left the feature after #259, and the inking credit subsequently varied. When World's Finest Comics reverted to the standard 36 pages, leftover Shazam! material saw publication in Adventure Comics (#491–492, September–October 1982). The remaining 11 issues of that run contained reprints, with Shazam! represented by mostly Fawcett-era stories (left out of Adventure Comics #500 and the final #503, where two features were doubled up to complete their respective story arcs).

Outside of their regular series and features, the Marvel Family characters also appeared as guest stars in the Justice League of America series, in particular issues #135–137 (vol. 1) for the "Crisis on Earth-S" story arc in 1976. Limited Collectors' Edition #C-58 (April 1978) featured a "Superman vs. Shazam!" story by writer Gerry Conway and artists Rich Buckler and Dick Giordano.

Captain Marvel, and often the Marvel Family, also co-starred with Superman in several issues of DC Comics Presents written by Roy Thomas. Thomas, a veteran comic book writer and editor, had been lured from Marvel Comics to DC in 1981 with the specific contractual obligation that he would become the main writer of Shazam! and the Justice Society of America characters. The Marvels also guest-starred in several issues of All-Star Squadron, a series centered on the Justice Society and the other Earth-2 characters written by Roy Thomas and his wife Dann. As All-Star Squadron was set during World War II, several events of the comic fell concurrent with and referenced the events of the original early-1940s Fawcett stories. With their 1985 Crisis on Infinite Earths miniseries, DC fully integrated the characters into the DC Universe.

=== Captain Marvel in the late 1980s ===
The first Post-Crisis appearance of Captain Marvel was in the 1986 Legends miniseries. In 1987, Captain Marvel appeared as a member of the Justice League in Keith Giffen's and J. M. DeMatteis' relaunch of that title. That same year (spinning off from Legends), he was given his own miniseries titled Shazam!: The New Beginning. With this four-issue miniseries, writers Roy and Dann Thomas and artist Tom Mandrake attempted to re-launch the Captain Marvel mythos and bring the wizard Shazam, Dr. Sivana, Uncle Dudley, and Black Adam into the modern DC Universe with an altered origin story.

The most notable change that the Thomases, Giffen, and DeMatteis introduced into the Captain Marvel mythos was that the personality of young Billy Batson is retained when he transforms into the Captain. This change would remain for most future uses of the character as justification for his sunny, Golden-Age personality in the darker modern-day comic book world, instead of the traditional depiction used prior to 1986, which tended to treat Captain Marvel and Billy as two separate personalities.

This revised version of Captain Marvel also appeared in one story arc featured in the short-lived anthology Action Comics Weekly #623–626 (October 25, 1988 – November 15, 1988), in which a Neo-Nazi version of Captain Marvel was introduced. At the end of the arc, it was announced that this would lead to a new Shazam! ongoing series. Though New Beginning had sold well and multiple artists were assigned to and worked on the book, it never saw publication owing to editorial disputes between DC Comics and Roy Thomas. As a result, Thomas's intended revival of the Marvel Family with a new punk-styled Mary Bromfield/Mary Marvel (a.k.a. "Spike") who was not Billy's sister, and an African-American take on Freddy Freeman/Captain Marvel Jr., did not see print. Thomas departed DC in 1989, not long after his removal from the Shazam! project. Other attempts at reviving Shazam! were initiated over the next three years, including a reboot project by John Byrne, illustrator of Legends and writer/artist on the Superman reboot miniseries The Man of Steel (1986). None of these versions saw print, though Captain Marvel, the wizard Shazam, and Black Adam did appear in DC's War of the Gods miniseries in 1991. By this time, DC had ended the fee-per-use licensing agreement with CBS Publications and purchased the full rights to Captain Marvel and the other Fawcett Comics characters.

=== The Power of Shazam! (1994; 1995–1999) ===
In 1991, Jerry Ordway was given the Shazam! assignment, which he pitched as a painted graphic novel that would lead into a series, rather than starting the series outright. Ordway both wrote and illustrated the graphic novel, titled The Power of Shazam!, which was released in 1994. Power of Shazam! retconned Captain Marvel again and gave him a revised origin, rendering Shazam! The New Beginning and the Action Comics Weekly story apocryphal while Marvel's appearances in Legends and Justice League remained in continuity.

Ordway's story more closely followed Captain Marvel's Fawcett origins, with only slight additions and changes. The graphic novel was a critically acclaimed success, leading to a Power of Shazam! ongoing series which ran from 1995 to 1999. That series reintroduced the Marvel Family and many of their allies and enemies into the modern-day DC Universe.

=== Kingdom Come and Shazam! Power of Hope ===
Captain Marvel also appeared in Mark Waid and Alex Ross's critically acclaimed 1996 alternate universe Elseworlds miniseries Kingdom Come. Set 20 years in the future, Kingdom Come features a brainwashed Captain Marvel playing a major role in the story as a mind-controlled pawn of an elderly Lex Luthor. In 2000, Captain Marvel starred in an oversized special graphic novel, Shazam! Power of Hope, written by Paul Dini and painted by Alex Ross.

=== Early to mid-2000s: JSA and 52 ===
Since the cancellation of the Power of Shazam! title in 1999, the Marvel Family has made appearances in a number of other DC comic books. Black Adam became a main character in Geoff Johns' and David S. Goyer's JSA series, which depicted the latest adventures of the world's first superhero team, the Justice Society of America, with Captain Marvel also briefly joining the team to keep an eye on his old nemesis. Captain Marvel also appeared in Frank Miller's graphic novel Batman: The Dark Knight Strikes Again, the sequel to Miller's highly acclaimed graphic novel The Dark Knight Returns, which culminated in his death. The Superman/Shazam: First Thunder miniseries, written by Judd Winick with art by Josh Middleton, and published between September 2005 and March 2006, depicted the first post-Crisis meeting between Superman and Captain Marvel.

The Marvel Family played an integral part in DC's 2005/2006 Infinite Crisis crossover, which began DC's efforts to retool the Shazam! franchise. In the Day of Vengeance miniseries, which preceded the Infinite Crisis event, the wizard Shazam is killed by the Spectre, and Captain Marvel assumes the wizard's place in the Rock of Eternity. The Marvel Family made a handful of guest appearances in the year-long weekly maxi-series 52, which featured Black Adam as one of its main characters. 52 introduced Adam's "Black Marvel Family," which included Adam's wife Isis, her brother Osiris, and Sobek. The series chronicled Adam's attempts to reform after falling in love with Isis, only to launch the DC universe into World War III after she and Osiris are killed. The Marvel Family appeared frequently in the 12-issue bimonthly painted Justice maxi-series by Alex Ross, Jim Krueger, and Doug Braithwaite, published from 2005 to 2007.

=== The Trials of Shazam! (2006–2008) ===
The Trials of Shazam!, a 12-issue maxiseries written by Judd Winick and illustrated by Howard Porter for the first eight issues, and by Mauro Cascioli for the remaining four, was published from 2006 to 2008. The series redefined the Shazam! property with a stronger focus on magic and mysticism. Trials of Shazam! featured Captain Marvel, now with a white costume and long white hair, taking over the role of the wizard Shazam under the name Marvel, while the former Captain Marvel Jr., Freddy Freeman, attempts to prove himself worthy to become Marvel's champion under the name Shazam.

In the pages of the 2007–2008 Countdown to Final Crisis limited series, Black Adam gives the powerless Mary Batson his powers, turning her into a more aggressive super-powered figure, less upstanding than the old Mary Marvel. By the end of the series, as well as in DC's 2008–2009 Final Crisis limited series, the now black-costumed Mary Marvel, possessed by the evil New God DeSaad, becomes a villainess, joining forces with Superman villain Darkseid and fighting both Supergirl and Freddy Freeman/Shazam.

A three-issue arc in Justice Society of America (vol. 3) undid many of the Trials of Shazam! changes. Issues #23-25 of Justice Society featured Black Adam and a resurrected Isis defeating Marvel and taking over the Rock of Eternity. Adam and Isis recruit the now-evil Mary Marvel to help them in the ensuing fight against a now-powerless Billy Batson and the Justice Society.

Billy and Mary Batson made a brief appearance during DC's 2009–2010 Blackest Night saga in a one-shot special, The Power of Shazam! #48. In 2011, DC published a one-shot Shazam! story written by Eric Wallace, in which the still-powerless Billy and Mary help Freddy/Shazam in a battle with the demoness Blaze. Freddy would eventually have his powers stolen by Osiris in Titans (vol. 2) #32 the same year.

=== The New 52 relaunch ===
Alternate cover for Justice League (vol. 2) #0 (Nov. 2012). Clockwise from bottom/front: Shazam!, Eugene Choi, Darla Dudley, Pedro Peña, Freddy Freeman, Mary Bromfield, Tawny, Black Adam, and Doctor Sivana. Art by Ivan Reis

In 2011, DC Comics relaunched their entire comic book lineup, creating The New 52 lineup of comics. The revamp began with a seven-issue miniseries, Flashpoint, which features an alternate timeline in which Billy Batson, Mary Batson, and Freddy Freeman are joined by three new kids, Eugene Choi, Pedro Peña, and Darla Dudley, as the "S! H! A! Z! A! M! Family." In this concept, all six kids say "Shazam!" in unison to become an alternate version of Captain Marvel named Captain Thunder. While the continuity would be altered again by the conclusion of the story, creating the "New 52" multiverse, the three new Shazam! kids would be reintroduced for later appearances.

One of these relaunched series, Justice League (vol. 2), began featuring a Shazam! backup story with issue #7 in March 2012. The feature, written by Geoff Johns and drawn by Gary Frank, introduces Billy Batson and his supporting cast into the new DC Universe. As part of the redesign, the character received a new costume designed by Frank with a long cloak and hood, and a metallic belt instead of a sash. His lightning bolt appears as an opening into his body with magical energy visibly inside of him. Johns noted that the character's place in the world will be "far more rooted in fantasy and magic than it ever was before". The character also was officially renamed "Shazam" at this time. The Shazam! origin story, which included two full issues in Justice League (vol. 2) #0 (2012) and 21 (2013), reintroduced Billy Batson/Shazam, the Wizard, Black Adam, Tawny the tiger, and the Shazam Family (Freddy, Mary, Darla, Eugene, and Pedro) to continuity. The Shazam! feature concluded with Justice League (vol. 2) #21, preceding DC's crossover storyline "Trinity War" which heavily features the Shazam mythos.

Johns and Frank's reboot was met with both acclaim and criticism, and the renaming of the hero as Shazam brought mixed reactions. Johns noted that the change was made "because that's what everyone thinks his name is anyway," owing to the inability to use the "Captain Marvel" moniker on comic book covers and merchandise. In updating Shazam!, Johns and Frank skirted some controversy among long-time fans by introducing Billy Batson as a cynical foster child who comes to appreciate his potential as a hero and the concept of family, rather than starting him from that point as with earlier retellings.

Following his appearances in the "Trinity War" and "Forever Evil" crossover storylines, Shazam appeared as a member of the Justice League from Justice League (vol. 2) #30–50 from 2014 through 2016, and also in a one-shot spinoff titled Justice League: The Darkseid War - Shazam (cover-dated January 2016). He also appeared as a supporting character in the Cyborg series as the friend of Victor Stone/Cyborg. New takes on the classic Fawcett versions of Shazam and the Marvel Family appeared in Grant Morrison's 2014 miniseries The Multiversity (which takes place on the parallel world of Earth-5) and in a 2015 spin-off to the Convergence crossover event, Convergence: Shazam! (which takes place on the parallel world of Earth-S).

=== DC Rebirth and beyond ===
Following DC's 2016 DC Rebirth soft-relaunch event, the Shazam! characters were largely absent from new DC continuity, though Mary Marvel of Earth-5 appeared in Superman (vol. 4) #14–16 (2016), and Black Adam appeared in Dark Nights: Metal #4–5 (2017) to battle Wonder Woman. In late 2018, with the Shazam! movie in production at New Line Cinema, DC began publishing a new ongoing Shazam! series, written by Geoff Johns and illustrated by Dale Eaglesham, Marco Santucci, and Scott Kolins. The series features an older and wiser Billy Batson and his foster siblings Mary, Freddy, Eugene, Pedro, and Darla exploring their powers as the Shazam Family. As the six kids venture beyond the nexus of the Rock of Eternity to explore the mysterious Seven Magic Realms, Doctor Sivana teams up with Mister Mind and a reluctant Black Adam to form the Monster Society of Evil, and Billy's long-missing father C.C. Batson returns to attempt to re-connect with his son.

The first issue, featuring a manga backup story focused on Mary and her pet rabbit Hoppy by Johns and Shazam! fan Mayo "SEN" Naito, was published on December 5, 2018. Thirteen issues from Johns, Eaglesham, and others - along with two guest issues, #12 and 15, from writer Jeff Loveness and artist Brandon Peterson - were published between 2018 and 2020. Despite initial positive reviews, the third volume of Shazam! fell victim to several publishing delays. The book was cancelled with issue #15 (November 2020); Johns cited the COVID-19 pandemic and Eaglesham's desire to take a break as reasons for discontinuing the book.

In November 2022, it was announced that a new Shazam! ongoing would begin publication in May 2023, with Mark Waid writing and Dan Mora serving as artist. During this series, Billy becomes known as "The Captain" and his foster siblings lose their powers.

== Fictional character biography ==
=== Fawcett/Early DC origin ===
Whiz Comics #2 (Feb. 1940) introduces William Joseph "Billy" Batson, a homeless 12-year-old (later 14-year-old) newsboy who sleeps in the subway station of his home city (originally New York City; later referred to in DC publications as Fawcett City). A mysterious man in a green cloak asks Billy to follow him into the subway station. A magic subway car painted in unusual shapes and colors escorts them to an underground throne room, which is inhabited by a very old man with a long beard and a white robe. As the man in green disappears, the old man on the throne explains to Billy that he is the wizard Shazam, and has used the powers of "the gods"—Solomon, Hercules, Atlas, Zeus, Achilles, and Mercury, hence the name "Shazam"—to fight evil for over 3,000 years. However, he has now grown too old to continue and is in need of a successor. The wizard explains that Billy was chosen because of his misfortune: he had been thrown out by a greedy uncle who stole his inheritance following the deaths of his parents (later retellings of the origin would also note that Billy was chosen for being "pure of heart"). Ordered by the wizard to speak the name "Shazam," Billy is struck by a sudden bolt of lightning and transformed into a superpowered adult in a red costume with gold trim. The wizard Shazam declares the new hero "Captain Marvel" and orders him to carry on his work, as a stone block suspended above his throne falls upon him, killing him as prophesied. The wizard would return—in later retellings of the origin story, immediately—as a spirit to serve as a mentor to Billy and Captain Marvel, summoned by lighting a torch on the wall of his lair. As a spirit, the wizard Shazam lives at the Rock of Eternity, a bicone-shaped rock formation situated at the nexus of time and space. Later retellings of the Captain Marvel origin place Shazam's underground lair within the Rock. Saying the word "Shazam" allows Billy to summon the magic lightning and become Captain Marvel, while Captain Marvel can say the magic word himself to become Billy again.

Captain Marvel's first battle was with the mad scientist Doctor Sivana, who becomes his arch-enemy. Billy Batson becomes a reporter and host for WHIZ Radio, his career allowing him to travel and investigate criminal activity. An adult daughter of Sivana's, Beautia, becomes an unwitting love interest for the shy Captain Marvel, despite her wavering allegiance to her evil father.

While the majority of Billy's adventures feature him as a solo hero, he also fought evil on a regular basis accompanied by several other kids who share his powers to make up a superhero team called the Marvel Family (later referred to as the Shazam Family owing to the issues DC Comics faced over the "Marvel" and "Captain Marvel" trademarks). The first members of the family, introduced in Whiz Comics #21 (Sept. 1941) and used sparingly afterwards, were the Lieutenant Marvels: three other boys from various parts of the United States who are also named "Billy Batson" and discover that, if they all say "Shazam!" in unison, they can become adult superheroes as well.

In Whiz Comics #25 (Dec. 1941), Captain Marvel saves Freddy Freeman, a boy who had been left for dead by the evil Captain Nazi, and does for Freddy what the wizard did for him. By speaking the name "Captain Marvel," Freddy can become the superpowered Captain Marvel Jr. Unlike Billy, Freddy retains his 14-year-old appearance as a superhero. Captain Marvel Adventures #18 (Dec. 1942) introduced Billy and Freddy to Mary Bromfield, a rich girl who turns out to be Billy's long-lost twin sister. By saying the magic word "Shazam," Mary Bromfield becomes Mary Marvel. In the Fawcett and pre-1986 DC stories, Mary remained a teenager as Freddy did in Marvel form; Ordway's 1990s Power of Shazam! series made her superpowered form an adult like Billy's. The Marvel Family also included non-powered honorary members such as Uncle Marvel, an old con man who pretended to be Mary's uncle, and Freckles Marvel, an honorary cousin.

=== Later DC origins ===
The basic elements of Billy Batson's and Captain Marvel's origin story remained more or less intact through 2012, with minor alterations over the years. Roy and Dann Thomas's 1987 miniseries Shazam! The New Beginning had a 15-year-old Billy being forced to move in with Doctor Sivana, who in this version is the cruel uncle who throws Billy out into the street. Jerry Ordway's 1994 Power of Shazam! graphic novel, which became the character's definite origin through 2011, featured a ten-year-old Billy being chosen as the Wizard Shazam's champion, because of the influence of his archaeologist parents; the mysterious stranger from magic subway car is the ghost of Billy's father in this version. Both the Thomases' and Ordway's retellings of the origin directly tie the need for the Wizard Shazam to draft a younger replacement to the coming re-emergence of Black Adam, the wizard's first champion from the days of ancient Egypt who became evil and was due to escape thousands of years of banishment.

Ordway's origin added the extra element of Adam's alter ego/descendant Theo Adam being the murderer of Billy's parents. The subsequent Power of Shazam! ongoing series features Billy, now 14, meeting his long-lost sister Mary and best friend Freddy Freeman and establishing the Marvel Family as in the Fawcett comics. The Marvels' home base of Fawcett City is depicted as a city full of old-fashioned traditions and architecture, later establishing that the Wizard Shazam placed a spell on the city (broken in later issues) that slowed time to a crawl in 1955. This phenomenon was used to explain the Marvel Family's sometimes anachronistic approaches to life and heroism compared to many of their contemporary heroes in the DC Universe.

==== New 52 onward ====
In 2012, writer and then-DC Chief Creative Officer Geoff Johns revised Billy Batson's origin for DC's New 52 universe, also renaming the character's alter-ego as "Shazam" at this time. In his new origin story, Billy Batson is a moody and troubled 15-year-old foster child living in Philadelphia who has gone through several foster homes. At his newest foster home under Victor and Rosa Vázquez, Billy gains five foster siblings: "den mother" Mary Bromfield, trickster and pick-pocket Freddy Freeman, shy and quiet Pedro Peña, brainy Eugene Choi, and energetic Darla Dudley. When Dr. Sivana resurrects the ancient warrior Black Adam from his tomb, the dying Wizard Shazam selected several candidates to inherit his power, all unsuitable until his spell summons Billy to the Rock of Eternity. Although Billy's argues the wizard's prerequisite for good people with a pure heart doesn't exist, the ancient entity senses the potential of goodness in him and, with no other viable candidate, chooses him. Blessing him the Powers of Shazam, the wizard passes away and transport Billy back to Earth. Billy reveals his powers to Freddy and scheme to make money and engage in juvenile fun but Billy finds himself acting as a hero and is attacked by Adam and the Seven Deadly Sins. A timely intervention from his foster siblings their empowerment from him tips the situation in his favor and Billy goads Adam into transforming into his human form, where he becomes dust due to being thousands of years old. Billy decides to stay with his new family, having learned to be a more positive and emotionally open.

During the "Trinity War" story line, Billy flies to Black Adam's home nation of Kahndaq to bury Adam's remains. Shazam's entry into the country is interpreted by the locals as illegal US entry into their territory. This leads to run-ins with both the independent Justice League and the US-sponsored Justice League of America (JLA), and a series of events that see the opening of Pandora's Box, a portal to Earth-3 which brings the evil Justice League analogues of the Crime Syndicate to Earth-0. Following the successful defeat of the Crime Syndicate, Shazam is inducted into the League. While still a newcomer to the league, Billy has a number of new adventures while under the mentorship of Cyborg, who becomes one of his best friends.

==== DC Rebirth ====
After a year of living in the Vázquez home, Billy and his foster siblings have taken to having fun fighting crime around Philadelphia as the Shazam Family. While exploring the Rock of Eternity, Eugene finds a formerly sealed-off area of the Rock: an abandoned train station leading to the seven realms of an unexplored world known as the Magic Lands. During his adventures, Billy Batson meets his biological father and defeats Superboy-Prime.

==== Infinite Frontier ====
Shazam eventually joins the Teen Titans while struggling to access his powers due to the Rock of Eternity not working. He goes to Hell and eventually regains control of his powers. Shazam plays a minor role in Dark Crisis where he declines Jon Kent's offer to join the Justice League during Dark Crisis but participate in the final battle against Deathstroke's army. Shazam also encounters different Gods and fights alongside Wonder Woman during Lazarus Planet: Revenge of the Gods.

==== Dawn of DC ====
Billy Batson changed his name to The Captain for his superhero name and the rest of his foster family (with the exception of Mary Marvel) not having super powers. Billy starts acting arrogant and violent due to the Greek Gods not being happy that the human beings not worshipping them anymore, but trying to better themselves. Mary Marvel deduces this during a confrontation with a villain, and Billy Batson confronts the Greek Gods for making him out of character. Billy Batson confronts the gods, but is shocked that Freddie offers to replace Billy. However, this is a ruse and Billy's family come to aid Billy and Freddie. Billy convinces Solomon to make him more wiser, and lectures the Greek Gods on their arrogance, persuading them to leave him alone. Billy is jealous of Freddie getting back his super powers, but helps him break free of Mister Mind's control while also meeting his biological mother. Billy would make minor appearances in "Absolute Power" when his powers are temporarily stolen by Amanda Waller, and he teams up with Superman to fight against Darkseid.

== Characterization ==
=== Description and personality ===
The secret identity of the character is William "Billy" Batson, an orphaned child who is blessed by the ancient Wizard Shazam with magical powers in which also transforms him into an adult form and battles the forces of evil. In personality, classic stories make him innocent in spite of his hardships. More recent stories alternatively cast Billy as a more jaded and troubled youth abandoned to foster care and chosen for his potential goodness. He is also typically depicted young; his origin and early stories first set him to be ten or eleven years old. Following Crisis on Infinite Earths, the character progressed in age to being fourteen or fifteen in his comic book series. Later instances depict Billy as about sixteen during his tenure in the Justice Society of America and implied him to be eighteen prior to the New 52. After the New 52, the character had remained fifteen, even in stories with a explicit passage of time.

As a superhero, he is among Earth's most powerful heroes on par with Superman and Wonder Woman, respected for his stalwart and virtuous character. Following his reinvention in the New 52, he is also recognized as the "Champion of Magic", a role designating him a protector of the Rock of Eternity and the Seven Magiclands (including Earth).

=== Powers and abilities ===
An ordinary human with no inherent powers beyond those granted to him by the Wizard Shazam, Billy's charisma made him a radio announcer; in modern stories, he is instead a content creator for his exploits as a superhero. He was also a capable street fighter but later tutored by Batman in basic hand-to-hand combat. When empowered, Billy Batson is capable of endowing himself a host of magical-based superpowers by saying the magic word ("Shazam!"), transforming him into a demigod-like being. After the New 52, these abilities are retroactively attributed to the Living Lightning, the magical power and essence from the Wizard himself, granting lightning control, usage of certain spells in circumstances, and enhancing the power of magic spells, healing abilities, and strength on its own.

While empowered in his demigod form, he is granted several powers associated with legendary mythological figures of Roman, Greek, and Abrahamic origin:

S	Wisdom of Solomon	The Wisdom of Solomon grants the individual several abilities, including perfect memory, strategic combat skills, exceptional mathematical aptitude, charisma in interpersonal interactions, limited clairvoyance for acquiring arcane knowledge and intuitive insights, as well as a natural fluency in all languages. Unlike some other powers, this is considered an active one a champion must channel to activate. In some stories, this power also gives him the ability to hypnotize people.
H	Strength of Hercules	This bestows on Billy an exceptional level of superhuman strength. He gains the ability to exert immense physical power, surpassing the capabilities of ordinary individuals. With this heightened strength, he can effortlessly lift and manipulate objects of tremendous weight, overpower adversaries with ease, and deliver devastating blows in combat. His strength is often compared to that of Superman. Golden Age Captain Marvel's strength is deemed limitless, enabling him to move stars and planets with ease.
A	Stamina of Atlas	The stamina attribute from Atlas enables Billy to maintain his empowered state for an extended period without any time limitations. Additionally, the empowerment provides Billy with sustenance, eliminating the need for eating, sleeping, and even breathing. As a result, Billy can operate at peak efficiency, unaffected by the physiological requirements that typically apply to ordinary individuals. This extraordinary stamina allows him to fully focus on his heroic duties without the distractions or limitations associated with physical sustenance.
Z	Power of Zeus	Zeus's "power" attribute facilitates the transformation that grants Billy access to the full range of his powers, including the ability to shoot bursts of electricity and lightning. He also possesses a limited gift of teleportation, allowing him to effortlessly travel to and from the Rock of Eternity with a single thought. Notably, the Power of Zeus empowers him with the potential to use magic and cast spells. This power is considered the most difficult, requiring the most study, focus, and discipline. After the character's re-introduction from New 52 onward, he displayed Latin-based spell-casting abilities that can achieved various effects such as fire manipulation and the ability to alter his size.
A	Courage of Achilles	The Courage of Achilles grants Billy peak physical defenses, rendering him nearly invulnerable. This heightened level of invulnerability provides significant protection against physical harm. Additionally, the empowerment grants Billy resistance to various elements, including heat, force, disease, and the effects of aging. This attribute allows him to withstand extreme conditions and maintain his health and vitality against formidable challenges. In some stories, it also grants him fighting prowess.
M	Speed of Mercury	The Speed of Mercury grants Billy super speed, enhanced reflexes, motor skills, and flight, enabling him to move at incredible speeds, react swiftly, perform precise maneuvers, and soar through the air. The pre-1985 stories also let him travel to the Rock of Eternity by flying faster than the speed of light.
During Darkseid War, Billy's source ("pantheon" or "elders") changed temporarily, now including the New Gods and other alien gods: Strength of S'ivaa granted him exceptional strength boasted to be at a higher level than previously.; Fires of H'ronmeer granted pyprokentic control from the "Living Fire".; Compassion of Anapel granted unknown powers.; Power of Zonuz granted him the power to draw energy from the Source, the energy field within all forms of life.; Boldness of Ate also granted unknown powers.; Living Lightning of Mamaragan strengthened the link between Billy and the Wizard Shazam.

At times, Billy has adopted the role of the Wizard Shazam and granted his powers; when the character adopted the "Marvel" codename and Wizard's magical power, while he no longer possessed the Powers of Shazam, he had the capacity to manipulate and command magical energies, transform between his mortal and older form at will, and possessed a innate, deep understanding of the supernatural, particularly during a period of shifting magical rules. In the Lazarus Planet storyline, Billy becomes tethered to the Rock of Eternity once again, gaining access to its vast magical energies. Thus far, he has shown to generate duplicates of his empowered form, each possessing his abilities, and can summon Mamaragan, the ancient being associated with his powers, at his own volition.

==== Weaknesses ====
In several stories, he is shown to be susceptible to powerful magic, which can weaken or de-power him. In older stories, significantly high voltages of lightning or electricity would make him revert to his original form. In classic stories, simply saying the word "Shazam!" transformed Billy between his powered and human form; this extended to accidental utterances, recorded playbacks, and so forth. The 2011 reboot changed the rules so that Shazam could speak the magic word "Shazam" without causing a transformation, necessitating an intent to transform for it to take place. This lasted until the 2023 comic event Lazarus Planet, when the rule once again became that speaking the word in any fashion would trigger the lightning.

Aspects of his powers are also considered difficult for the character to grasp, with the Power of Zeus's requirement for focus, discipline, and study remarked to not be Billy's forte. Despite possessing the courage of Achilles, the Fawcett version was extremely bashful and shy around attractive women, a weakness some villains would exploit. When sharing his powers with his superhero family teammates (be it the original Marvel Family or Shazam Family from 2012 onward), the Powers of Shazam was depicted as a finite source which would be divided into halves, thirds, or further depending upon how many were transformed at one time, and weakening him (and them) accordingly.

== Other versions ==
=== Alternate universe versions ===
- In 52 #52 (published May 2, 2007), a new Multiverse is revealed, originally consisting of 52 identical realities, one of which is designated Earth-5. As a result of Mister Mind "eating" aspects of this reality, it takes on visual aspects similar to the pre-Crisis Earth-S, including the Marvel Family characters. The Earth-5 Captain Marvel and Billy Batson appeared, assisting Superman, in the Final Crisis: Superman Beyond miniseries. The miniseries established that these versions of Captain Marvel and Billy are separate beings, and that Billy is a reporter for WHIZ Media rather than a radio broadcaster. The Earth-5 Captain Marvel reappeared in Final Crisis #7, along with an army of Supermen from across the Multiverse to prevent its destruction by Darkseid. Following The New 52 Multiverse reboot, Earth-5 remains a Fawcett Comics–inspired setting, and is spotlighted in the comic book The Multiversity: Thunderworld #1 (Feb 2015), a modernized take on the classic Fawcett Captain Marvel stories from writer Grant Morrison and artist Cameron Stewart.
- A Captain Marvel miniseries, Shazam!: The Monster Society of Evil, written and illustrated by Jeff Smith, was published in four 48-page installments between February and July 2007. Smith's Shazam! miniseries, in the works since 2003, is a more traditional take on the character, which updates and reimagines Captain Marvel's origin. Smith's story features a younger-looking Billy Batson and Captain Marvel as separate personalities, as they were in the pre-1985 stories, and features a prepubescent Mary Marvel as Captain Marvel's sidekick, instead of the traditional teen-aged or adult versions. Dr. Sivana is Attorney General of the United States, and Mister Mind looks more like a snake than a caterpillar.
- An all-ages Captain Marvel comic, Billy Batson and the Magic of Shazam!, debuted in July 2008 under DC's Johnny DC youth-oriented imprint, and was published monthly through December 2010. Following the lead and continuity of Smith's Monster Society of Evil miniseries, it was initially written and drawn by Mike Kunkel, creator of Herobear. Art Baltazar and Franco Aureliani, of Tiny Titans, took over as writers with issue #5, with Byron Vaughns as main artist until issue #13, when Mike Norton assumed his place for the remainder of the series. Kunkel's version returns to the modern concept of having Captain Marvel retain Billy's personality, and also introduces new versions of Black Adam (whose alter ego, Theo Adam, is a child like Billy Batson in this version), King Kull, the Arson Fiend, and Freddy Freeman/Captain Marvel Jr.
- A potential future incarnation of Billy Batson is introduced during the Future State event. This iteration of the character shares a similar background to their DC Rebirth counterpart, following a similar history until a point of divergence during their time as a student at the Teen Titans Academy in the Infinite Frontier era. In this version, the character demonstrates enhanced magical abilities, having acquired the sorcerous skills from tutelage under Raven. He also displayed the power to manipulate the powers other prominent mystics within the DC Universe such as Johnny Thunder and Jakeem Thunder. Billy is among the various heroes who assist the Titans in confronting Red X and the Four Horsemen of Apocalypse. Raven succeeds in absorbing the Horsemen but becomes corrupted under their influence. Shazam then uses his power to seal her in the Rock of Eternity at her behest to contain her power. Becoming known as the Unkindness, she uses her limited influence to create an alliance with Neron, who uses his power to split Shazam and Billy into independent beings. As Billy maintains his position, his innocence used to ward off demons on account the Rock of Eternity has been displaced within Hell, Shazam works to fight external threats. Shazam assumes the role of leader within the Justice League of America, based in Detroit. However, in the absence of Billy's inherent influence, Shazam's morality becomes increasingly corrupted. He engages in secret killings of both super-villains and heroes who oppose his views, including the Question, who is the successor to Renee Montoya and Vic Sage, known as Drake. Shazam is also responsible for the deaths of Jakeem Thunder, Johnny Thunder, and the Creeper. Eventually, the identity of the Question is revealed to be Deadman, who has taken possession of Drake's body and acted as another successor to the Question in the JLA. The Spectre intervenes upon discovering Shazam's actions. Though aware of Shazam's past heroism, the Spectre is shocked to learn that his recent behavior is partly influenced by events in Hell, of which the Spectre had no prior knowledge. Shazam strikes and kills the Spectre using the remaining material from the Spear of Destiny. Deadman, as the Question, reveals himself to Shazam and temporarily uses the magic word to strip him of his powers. This entire sequence of events is later uncovered as a ploy orchestrated by Raven and Neron, with the goal of redirecting Shazam's powers back to the Rock of Eternity, which Raven absorbs. Empowered by her natural abilities, the Powers of Shazam, and the Four Horsemen of Apocalypse, Raven confidently escapes her confinement, believing that with the Spectre's demise, there will be no one to oppose her. Meanwhile, Billy mysteriously disappears, and his fate remains unknown.

=== Alternate timeline versions ===
- The 2011 Flashpoint comics miniseries, written by Geoff Johns with art by Andy Kubert, featured an alternate timeline accidentally created by the Flash, who then helped the heroes of this timeline to restore history. One of those heroes is Captain Thunder—an alternative version of Captain Marvel who has six alter-egos, rather than one, and a scarred face as the result of a fight with Wonder Woman, who in this timeline is a villain. The six children, collectively known as "S.H.A.Z.A.M.", each possess one of the six attributes of the power of Shazam, and must say the magic word together to become Captain Thunder. They are: Eugene Choi, who possesses the wisdom of Solomon; Pedro Peña, who possesses the strength of Hercules; Mary Batson, Freddy Freeman and Billy Batson, who possess the stamina of Atlas, the power of Zeus, and the courage of Achilles, respectively; and Darla Dudley who possesses the speed of Mercury. Pedro's pet tiger Tawny also transforms into a more powerful version of himself via the magic lightning. The six children later transform into Captain Thunder to help Flash and his allies stop the war between Aquaman's Atlantean army and Wonder Woman's Amazonian forces. Captain Thunder briefly fights Wonder Woman to a draw before being transformed back into the six children by Flash's accomplice Enchantress, who is revealed to be a traitor. Before the kids can re-form Captain Thunder, Billy is stabbed by the Amazon Penthesileia and killed. After the conclusion of the miniseries, the three new children from the Flashpoint timeline—Eugene, Pedro, and Darla—were incorporated into the mainline DC Universe, appearing as Billy, Mary, and Freddy's foster siblings.
- In the dark alternate future of the Elseworlds comic Superman: Distant Fires (1998) by Howard Chaykin, Gil Kane, Kevin Nowlan, and Matt Hollingsworth, most of humanity has been destroyed in nuclear war. An adult Billy Batson becomes obsessed with Wonder Woman when they become part of a small community of survivors of the holocaust, with most of the surviving superhumans having lost their powers or dealing with altered abilities. When the now-powerless Clark Kent joins their community, starting a relationship with Wonder Woman that includes them having a child together, Batson's resentment of Superman becomes insanity, as he provokes his transformation into Captain Marvel despite use of this power causing damage to Earth.
- In the dark alternate future shown in Frank Miller's 2001–2002 comic miniseries The Dark Knight Strikes Again, Captain Marvel is visibly aged, with receding white hair and glasses. Lex Luthor, who has captured Mary Marvel, coerces him into working for him by threatening to kill her. During an alien attack on Metropolis, Marvel is trapped underneath a collapsing building with no way out, and admits that Billy Batson—here, clearly defined as a separate person from Marvel, rather than simply transforming into him—died eight years ago of unspecified health problems. As a result, when he next speaks his word, he will cease to exist like any dream when there is nobody left to remember it. His last words to Wonder Woman are to give everyone his best, noting that it was nice existing, before he calls down his lightning and destroys himself.
- The 1996 miniseries Kingdom Come, written by Mark Waid with painted art by Alex Ross, depicts a possible future of the DC characters. In this version, Billy Batson is an adult who now matches the appearance of his superhero identity. The human hostility towards superheroes has made him uneasy, and he has not transformed into Captain Marvel for several years. Batson has become the brainwashed servant of Lex Luthor, who uses Mister Mind's mind-controlling worm offspring to keep him in check and bend him to his will. Nevertheless, Batson's potential as a being powerful enough to rival Superman causes many others to react in fear and unease when he mingles with them, believing it is a non-costumed Captain Marvel that serves Luthor. Events finally cause him to transform into Captain Marvel, and he unleashes a force that could destroy the world. When the authorities try to stop it by dropping a nuclear bomb, Captain Marvel sacrifices himself to intercept it. The nuclear blast kills a large number of heroes, but cools the war-like attitudes of the survivors. Superman uses Marvel's cape as the symbol of a new world order in which humans and superhumans will live in harmony.

=== Alternate successors ===
- A female version of Captain Marvel, Sahar Shazeen, is shown as a member of an alternate-future Justice League in Justice League: Generation Lost, a 2010 comics maxiseries written by Judd Winick and Keith Giffen. Little is revealed about he and she is shown wielding a pair of swords during battle. She and her teammates are ultimately killed by an army of OMACs.
- In the alternate universe Elseworlds one-shot comic Elseworld's Finest: Supergirl & Batgirl (1998) by Tom Simmons, Matt Haley and Barbara Kesel, the current Captain Marvel is depicted as a bald African-American man. A flashback to the older Justice Society features the traditional Caucasian Captain Marvel, leading to the conclusion that there were two Captain Marvels.

=== Other similar characters ===
==== Captain Thunder ====
In "Make Way for Captain Thunder" from Superman #276 (June 1974), Superman found himself at odds with "Captain Thunder", a superhero displaced from another Earth and another time. Thunder had been magically tricked by his archenemies in the Monster League of Evil into committing evil himself, which led to his doing battle with Superman. Captain Thunder, whose name was derived from Captain Marvel's original moniker, was a thinly veiled pastiche of Marvel—down to his similar costume, his young alter ego named "Willie Fawcett" (a reference to Fawcett Comics), and a magic word ("Thunder!"), which was an acronym for seven entities and their respective powers. He got his power from rubbing a magic belt buckle with a thunder symbol on it and saying "Thunder". His powers came from Tornado (power), Hare (speed), Uncas (bravery), Nature (wisdom), Diamond (toughness), Eagle (flight), and Ram (tenacity). Superman held him while he used his wisdom to escape the effects of the spell. "Make Way for Captain Thunder" was written by Elliot S! Maggin and illustrated by Curt Swan and Bob Oskner. At the time of its publication, DC had been printing Shazam! comics for 18 months, but had kept that universe separate from those of its other publications. The real Captain Marvel would finally meet Superman in Justice League of America #137, two years later (although he met Lex Luthor in Shazam! #15, November/December 1974).

In 1983, a proposal for an updated Captain Marvel was submitted to DC by Roy Thomas, Don Newton, and Jerry Ordway. This version of the character, to be an inhabitant of DC's main Earth-One universe, rather than the Fawcett-based Earth-S universe, would have featured an African-American version of Billy Batson named "Willie Fawcett" (as in the 1974 story), who spoke the magic word "Shazam!" to become Captain Thunder, Earth-One's Mightiest Mortal. This alternate version of the character was never used, and Roy and Dann Thomas used the name Captain Thunder for a creator-owned character in Captain Thunder and Blue Bolt, launched in 1987 by Hero Comics. Roy Thomas later explained that he disliked the idea of DC Comics acquiring the Captain Thunder trademark through the publication of just one story, and felt that taking the trademark from them was a sort of retribution for the Captain Marvel lawsuit against Fawcett Comics, commenting, "I just felt that it just wasn't right for DC to have the rights to the name Captain Thunder. They didn't deserve it. They couldn't use 'Captain Marvel'; they didn't deserve 'Captain Thunder'. ... And I loved the name 'Captain Thunder', so I just took it and made no apologies for it."

==== Robert Rodgers ====
A one-shot alternate take on Shazam! was published as part of the Just Imagine... comics line in 2001, which saw Marvel Comics legend Stan Lee reimagining various DC characters. Lee reimagined the original Shazam! premise by having the hero be a mild mannered Interpol agent, Robert Rogers. Teamed with the beautiful, and much tougher, fellow agent, Carla Noral, the two of them are in India searching for the megalomaniac master criminal Gunga Kahn. Rogers is given the ability to transform into a large, winged being by saying the magic word "Shazam!" This version is co-created with Gary Frank, and is based on the Bill Parker–C. C. Beck character. In a backup story plotted by Michael Uslan, scripted by Lee and Uslan, and drawn by Kano, an orphaned American boy in India at the same time as the adventures of Shazam heroically saves a village from starvation with the help of a local boy named Zubin Navotny. The boy's name is Billy Marvel, and he and Zubin are made honorary captains in the U.S. Peace Corps by an Ambassador named Batson, making the boy "Captain Marvel."

==== Mazahs ====
Mazahs is a corrupted alternate-universe version of Shazam, introduced in the 2013–14 Forever Evil DC Comics crossover event series written by Geoff Johns. He is the super-powered alter-ego of Alexander Luthor of Earth-3. In the story, the Crime Syndicate (evil Earth-3 analogues of the Justice League) have brought Alexander Luthor, their prisoner, with them to the Prime Earth where the Justice League and other heroes reside. Prime Earth's Lex Luthor and his team sneak in to the Justice League Watchtower where the Syndicate has Alexander hostage, and remove the duct tape over his mouth, allowing Alexander to speak the magic word "Mazahs!" and transform into his muscular, highly powerful alter-ego. While Prime Earth's Shazam is known for sharing his powers with others, Mazahs kills other superbeings and takes their powers for his own, as when he kills the Syndicate's speedster Johnny Quick. It is implied that the power of Mazahs previously belonged to Earth-3's Will Batson, before he was killed by Alexander. In the final issue of the series, it is revealed that Earth-3's Wonder Woman analogue, Superwoman, is in a relationship with Alexander and tricked her teammates into bringing him with them. She also reveals she is carrying his child, who is prophesied to bring an end to the world. Exploiting his ability to use the powers of those he has killed, Mazahs easily takes down both the Syndicate and Luthor's team, but Prime Earth Lex Luthor (having the same voice as Mazahs) manages to call down the lightning, using a lightning-rod that Batman had retrieved to try and use against Johnny Quick based on his planned defense against the Flash, and transform Mazahs into his human form. Sealing Alexander's mouth, Lex stabs him with a knife, killing him.

Superwoman later gives birth to Mazahs's child in Justice League #50, and uses the baby's power-stealing abilities, inherited from his father and activated when she says the magic word, to remove abilities the members the Prime-Earth Justice League had inherited from their time on Apokolips after the death of Darkseid. The story ends with the orphaned baby having absorbed both the Omega Effect from Lex Luthor as well as the Anti-Life Equation from Justice League associate Steve Trevor, transforming him into a resurrected—yet still infantile—Darkseid.

== Supporting cast ==
=== Classic supporting cast ===
In earlier Shazam! stories, Captain Marvel often fights evil as a member of a superhero team known as the Marvel Family, made up of himself and several other heroes empowered by the wizard Shazam. The main core of the Marvel Family were Captain Marvel's sister Mary Marvel, the alter-ego of Billy Batson's twin sister Mary Batson (adopted as Mary Bromfield), and Marvel's protégé, Captain Marvel Jr., who was the alter-ego of Billy and Mary's best friend, the disabled newsboy Freddy Freeman.

Other supporting cast characters included Sterling Morris, president of Amalgamated Broadcasting, owners of Station WHIZ, the radio (and later TV) station for which Billy worked as a reporter. In the early Fawcett stories, Billy Batson and Captain Marvel had a sidekick named Steamboat, an African-American valet character who was removed from the comics by 1945 because of protests over racial stereotyping. From 1947 forward, Billy/Marvel's sidekick was Mr. Tawky Tawny, an anthropomorphic talking tiger who works as a museum curator and seeks integration into human society. Before DC's Crisis on Infinite Earths comic book miniseries in 1985, the Marvel Family also included part-time members such as Mary's non-powered friend "Uncle" Dudley (Uncle Marvel) and three other protégés (all of whose alter egos are named "Billy Batson") known as the Lieutenant Marvels. A pink rabbit version of Captain Marvel, Hoppy the Marvel Bunny, appeared in his own stories.

The Marvel Family's other non-powered allies have traditionally included Dr. Sivana's good-natured adult offspring, Beautia and Magnificus Sivana. The 1970s Shazam! series also included Sunny Sparkle, the "nicest boy in the world." Jerry Ordway's 1990s Power of Shazam! series also introduced Billy's school principal, Miss Wormwood, and Mary's adoptive parents, Nick and Nora Bromfield.

=== Modern supporting cast ===
The current-continuity version of Shazam has a Shazam Family made up of his five foster siblings, with whom he shares his powers: Mary Bromfield, Freddy Freeman, Pedro Peña, Eugene Choi, and Darla Dudley. The latter three children were introduced in the Flashpoint miniseries as three of the six children sharing the powers of "Captain Thunder", and introduced into regular DC continuity with Justice League (vol. 2) #8 in 2012. Tawny was initially depicted as a magically charged zoo tiger in the Justice League backup stories. In the 2018–present ongoing Shazam! series, a more traditional version of Tawny is a resident of The Wildlands, a magical realm inhabited by anthropomorphic animals.

The New 52 reboot of Shazam! introduced the Shazam kids' foster parents, Victor and Rosa Vázquez; . Billy's relationship with them was depicted as difficult due to Billy's previous experiences with foster families but eventually imporves overtime, with Rosa and Victor officially adopted them all later. The Mamaragan incarnation of the Wizard Shazam also remains a key supporting character with some differences from earlier stories; Steve Orlando described their dynamic during the Darkseid War storyline, wherein the pair become more connected. While beginning as a "somewhat antagonistic pairing" in earlier stories, it evolved into a "pseudo father and son" relationship who has faith in Billy's capabilities.

=== Romantic interests ===
Billy Batson and Courtney Whitmore in JSA (1999) #48. Art by Leonard Kirk.

Prior to Crisis on Infinite Earths, Billy was in an relationship with Cissie Sommerly, who was also the niece of Billy's boss at WHIZ Radio, Sterling Morris, and had a recurring role in the comics. Cissie returned in the 2025 ongoing the web-comic series, The Magical Mysteries of Shazam!, in which she runs a podcast funded by Fawcett High School. Similar to the Fawcett comics, Billy developed a crush on her. More significantly, during the "Princes of Darkness" arc from Geoff Johns's JSA, team member Courtney Whitmore, aka Stargirl, discovered that Billy is the same age as her, which led to them briefly dating. To outsiders, however, Captain Marvel is by all appearances a fully grown-up adult, and the relationship between Marvel and Stargirl draws criticism from Jakeem Thunder and Jay Garrick. After Garrick confronts them, Marvel decides to leave the JSA and Courtney, instead of revealing his secret to the team. Marvel later returns to the JSA and explains that the Wisdom of Solomon prevents him from revealing his secret identity.

== Collected editions ==
Many of the character's appearances have been collected into several volumes:

Collected editions
Title	Year of release	Publisher	ISBN	Details	Writers and artists	Format
Special Edition Series: Book 1 – Whiz Comics	1974	DynaPubs		This softcover volume features Golden Age adventures of Captain Marvel from Whiz Comics #7–28 in black and white.	Stories by Bill Parker, Ed Herron, and others; Art by C. C. Beck, Pete Costanza, Marc Swayze, Mac Raboy, and others.	8 1/2 in. × 11 in., 208 pages
Special Edition Series: Book 3 – Captain Marvel Jr.	1975	DynaPubs		This softcover volume reprints Captain Marvel Jr. stories from Master Comics #27–42 in black and white. Four covers are featured in full color on the back cover.	Stories by Ed Herron and others; Art by C. C. Beck, Pete Costanza, Marc Swayze, Mac Raboy, and others	8 1/2 in. × 11 in., 208 pages
Shazam! From the Forties to the Seventies	1977	Harmony Books	ISBN 0-517-53127-5	Hardcover collection reprinting 37 Captain Marvel, Captain Marvel Jr., Mary Marvel, and Marvel Family stories from the original Fawcett comics and DC's 1970s Shazam! series in black and white, with some color pages.	Stories by Bill Parker, Otto Binder, and others. Introduction by E. Nelson Bridwell; Art by C. C. Beck, Pete Costanza, Marc Swayze, Mac Raboy, Kurt Schaffenberger, and others	352 pages
The Monster Society of Evil: Deluxe Limited Collector's Edition	1989	American Nostalgia Library	ISBN 0-948248-07-6	Compiled and designed by Mike Higgs. Reprints the entire "Monster Society of Evil" story arc from Captain Marvel Adventures #22–46 (1943–1945). This oversized, slipcased hardcover book was limited to 3,000 numbered copies.	Stories by Otto Binder; Art by C. C. Beck and Pete Costanza	
The Shazam! Archives Volume 1	1992	DC Comics	ISBN 1-56389-053-4	Hardcover volume collecting Fawcett Captain Marvel stories from Whiz Comics #2 - 15	Stories by Bill Parker; Art by C. C. Beck	120 pages
The Shazam! Archives Volume 2	1998	DC Comics	ISBN 1-56389-521-8	Hardcover volume collecting Fawcett Captain Marvel stories from Whiz Comics #16 - 20, plus Special Edition Comics #1 and Captain Marvel Adventures #1.	Stories by Bill Parker, Ed Herron, and others; Art by C. C. Beck, Pete Costanza, Mac Raboy, Joe Simon, Jack Kirby, George Tuska, and others	232 pages
The Shazam! Archives Volume 3	2002	DC Comics	ISBN 1-56389-832-2	Hardcover volume collecting Fawcett Captain Marvel stories from Whiz Comics #21 - 24, Captain Marvel Adventures #2-3, and America's Greatest Comics #1	Stories by Ed Herron and others; Art by C. C. Beck, Pete Costanza, Mac Raboy, George Tuska, and others	216 pages
Shazam! and the Shazam Family! Annual No. 1	2002	DC Comics	ISBN 1-56389-832-2	An 80-Page Giant-style, square-bound paperback collection reprinting several Golden Age Marvel Family adventures from Captain Marvel Adventures #18, Captain Marvel, Jr. #12, and The Marvel Family #1, 10; including the first appearances of Mary Marvel and Black Adam.	Stories by Otto Binder; Art by C. C. Beck, Pete Costanza, Mac Raboy, Marc Swayze, Bud Thompson, and Jack Binder	216 pages
The Shazam! Archives Volume 4	2005	DC Comics	ISBN 1-4012-0160-1	Hardcover volume collecting Fawcett Captain Marvel stories from America's Greatest Comics #2, Captain Marvel Adventures #4-5; and the origins of Captain Marvel, Jr. and Captain Nazi from Master Comics #21-22 and Whiz Comics #25	Stories by Ed Herron and others; Art by C. C. Beck, Pete Costanza, Mac Raboy, George Tuska, and others	216 pages
DC's Greatest Imaginary Stories, Vol. 1	2005	DC Comics	ISBN 978-1401205348	A showcase of alternate universe "imaginary stories" that depict a series of possible futures. Includes Captain Marvel Adventures #66, Batman #127, 151; Superman's Girl Friend, Lois Lane #19, 51; Superman #149, 162; Superman's Pal Jimmy Olsen #57, The Flash #128, and World's Finest Comics #173.	Stories by various writers; Art by various artists	192 pages
The Shazam! Family Archives	2006	DC Comics	ISBN 1-4012-0779-0	This spin-off volume features the adventures of Captain Marvel Jr., from Master Comics #23–32 and Captain Marvel, Jr. #1, as well as the origin of Mary Marvel from Captain Marvel Adventures #18.	Stories by various writers; Art by Mac Raboy, Al Carreno, Marc Swayze, and C. C. Beck	228 pages
Showcase Presents: Shazam!	2006	DC Comics	ISBN 1-4012-1089-9	A 500-page trade paperback featuring black-and-white reprints of stories from the 1970s Shazam! ongoing series, collecting only the new material that was published (and not the Golden Age reprints) in issues #1–33.	Written by Dennis O'Neil, E. Nelson Bridwell, and Elliot S. Maggin; Art by C. C. Beck, Kurt Schaffenberger, Dave Cockrum, Dick Giordano, and others	500 pages
The Trials of Shazam!: The Complete Series	2007, 2008; 2019	DC Comics	ISBN 1-4012-9229-1	Reprints The Trials of Shazam! #1–12 and a short story from DCU Brave New World #1. Originally released in two halves as Volume 1 (2007, ISBN 1-4012-1331-6) and Volume 2 (2008, ISBN 1-4012-1829-6); the single-volume version was released in 2019.	Written by Judd Winick; Art by Howard Porter and Mauro Cascioli	312 pages
Shazam! The Greatest Stories Ever Told	2008	DC Comics	ISBN 1-4012-1674-9	A compilation featuring Captain Marvel stories collected from the Fawcett publications Whiz Comics #2; Captain Marvel Adventures #1, 137, 148; The Marvel Family #21, 85; and the DC publications Shazam! #1, 14; DC Comics Presents Annual #3; Superman #276; L.E.G.I.O.N. '91 #31; The Power of Shazam! #33; and Adventures in the DC Universe.	Various	224 pages
DC Goes Ape	2008	DC Comics	ISBN 978-1401219352	A compilation of various confrontations between superheroes and apes. Collects Superboy #76, Superman #138, The Flash #127 and (vol. 2) #151, Detective Comics #339 and 482, Hawkman #16, Wonder Woman #170, Strange Adventures #201, Shazam! #9, and Super Friends #30.	Various	168 pages
Justice League: The World's Greatest Superheroes	2010, 2017, 2018	DC Comics	ISBN 978-1401202552	A compilation of picturesque graphic novels featuring DC heroes battling societal problems. Collects Superman: Peace on Earth, Batman: War on Crime, Shazam! Power of Hope, Wonder Woman: Spirit of Truth, JLA: Secret Origins, and JLA: Liberty and Justice.	Stories by Paul Dini; Art by Alex Ross	400 pages
Superman vs. Shazam!	2013, 2021	DC Comics	ISBN 1-4012-3821-1	A compilation featuring past team-ups and fights between The Man of Steel and the World's Mightiest Mortal in this collection also featuring Mr. Mxyzptlk, Mr. Mind, Captain Nazi, Black Adam, and more. Collects All-New Collector's Edition C-58; DC Comics Presents #33–34, 49; and DC Comics Presents Annual #3. The 2021 edition includes all of the issues from the previous collection plus Kingdom Come #1 and 4, The Power of Shazam! #46, and Superman (vol. 2) #216. (ISBN 978-1779509093)	Various	192 pages
Shazam! Vol. 1	2013; 2019, 2020	DC Comics	ISBN 978-1-4012-4244-2	Compiles the revised New 52 origins of Billy Batson and Shazam from backup features originally printed in Justice League (vol. 2) #0, 7–11, 14–16, 18–21. Re-released in 2019 as the Shazam! Origins trade paperback, with a photo cover from the New Line Cinema/Warner Bros. film Shazam! starring Zachary Levi (ISBN 978-1401-28789-4). A hardcover Deluxe Edition (ISBN 978-1779506849, 208 pgs) was published in 2020.	Story by Geoff Johns; Art by Gary Frank	192 pages
Shazam! A Celebration of 75 Years	2015	DC Comics	ISBN 1-4012-5538-8	Expanded hardcover Shazam! anthology spanning the Fawcett and DC eras from 1939 to 2013, including essays on the history of the characters. Features stories from Fawcett publications such as Whiz Comics, Captain Marvel Adventures and The Marvel Family, as well as DC publications such as Shazam!, The Power of Shazam!, JSA, and more.	Various	400 pages
Shazam! The World's Mightiest Mortal Volume 1	2019	DC Comics	ISBN 1-4012-8839-1	Hardcover volume featuring color reprints of the new stories of issues #1-18 of the 1970s Shazam! ongoing series.	Written by Dennis O'Neil, E. Nelson Bridwell, and Elliot S. Maggin; Art by C. C. Beck, Kurt Schaffenberger, Dave Cockrum, and Dick Giordano	352 pages
Shazam! The World's Mightiest Mortal Volume 2	2020	DC Comics	ISBN 1-4012-8839-1	Hardcover volume featuring color reprints of the new stories of issues #19-35 of the 1970s Shazam! ongoing series; plus All-New Collector's Edition C-58	Written by Dennis O'Neil, E. Nelson Bridwell, and Elliot S. Maggin; Art by Kurt Schaffenberger, Dave Cockrum, Dick Giordano, and Don Newton	328 pages
The Power of Shazam! Book One: In The Beginning	2020	DC Comics	ISBN 978-1401299415	Hardcover volume collecting the 1994 The Power of Shazam! graphic novel, issues #1-12 of the subsequent 1995 ongoing The Power of Shazam! series, plus a 1994 Shazam! story from Superman & Batman Magazine #4	Written by Jerry Ordway; Art by Jerry Ordway, Peter Krause, Mike Manley, Curt Swan, and Rick Burchett	408 pages
Shazam! and the Seven Magic Lands	2020	DC Comics	ISBN 978-1779504593	Trade paperback collecting the main story from the 2018-2020 Shazam! series. Collects Shazam! (vol. 3) #1-11, 13-14.	Written by Geoff Johns; Art by Dale Eaglesham, Scott Kolins, Marco Santucci	344 pages
Shazam: The World's Mightiest Mortal Volume 3	2021	DC Comics	ISBN 978-1779509468	Hardcover volume featuring reprints of the Captain Marvel stories from World's Finest Comics #253-270, 272-282 and Adventure Comics #491-492	Written by E. Nelson Bridwell; Art by Don Newton, Kurt Schaffenberger	336 pages
The Power of Shazam Book 2: The Worm Turns	2023	DC Comics	ISBN 978-1779504708	Hardcover volume collecting The Power of Shazam! #13-23, Annual 1; Superman: The Man of Tomorrow #4, Showcase '96 #7, Superboy Plus #1, and Supergirl Plus #1	Written by Jerry Ordway; Art by various	424 pages

== In other media ==
=== Television ===
==== 1970s–1990s ====
Captain Marvel first came to television in 1974. Filmation produced Shazam!, a live-action series, which ran from 1974 to 1976 on CBS. From 1975 until the end of its run, it aired as one-half of The Shazam!/Isis Hour alongside The Secrets of Isis.

Instead of directly following the lead of the comics, Shazam! took a more indirect approach to the character: Billy Batson/Captain Marvel, accompanied by an older man known simply as Mentor (Les Tremayne), traveled in a motor home across the U.S., interacting with people in different towns in which they stopped to save the citizens from some form of danger or to help them combat some form of evil. With the wizard Shazam absent from this series, Billy received his powers and counsel directly from the six "immortal elders" represented in the "Shazam" name, who were depicted via animation: Solomon, Hercules, Atlas, Zeus, Achilles, and Mercury. Shazam! starred Michael Gray as Billy Batson, with both Jackson Bostwick (season 1) and John Davey (seasons 2 and 3) as Captain Marvel. An adapted version of Isis, the heroine of The Secrets of Isis, was introduced into DC Comics in 2006 as Black Adam's wife.

Shortly after the Shazam! show ended its network run, Captain Marvel (played by Garrett Craig) appeared as a character in a pair of low-budget, live-action comedy specials, produced by Hanna-Barbera Productions under the name Legends of the Superheroes in 1979. The specials also featured Howard Morris as Doctor Sivana, and Ruth Buzzi as Aunt Minerva, marking the first appearance of the characters in film or television. Although Captain Marvel did not appear in Hanna-Barbera's long-running concurrent Saturday morning cartoon series Super Friends (which featured many of the other DC superheroes), he did appear in some of the merchandise associated with the show.

Filmation revisited the character three years later in The Kid Super Power Hour with Shazam!, which aired alongside Hero High. Captain Marvel and Billy Batson were both voiced by Burr Middleton. The rest of the Marvel Family joined Captain Marvel on his adventures in this series, which were more similar to his comic-book adventures than the 1970s TV show. Dr. Sivana, Mr. Mind, Black Adam, and other familiar Captain Marvel foes appeared as enemies.

Captain Marvel or Billy Batson made brief "cameo" appearances in two 1990s TV series. An unnamed reporter resembling Billy appears in the Superman: The Animated Series episode "Obsession", while live actors portraying Captain Marvel make "cameo" appearances in both a dream-sequence within an episode of The Drew Carey Show, and in the Beastie Boys' music video for "Alive".

==== 2000s–present ====
- Because of licensing issues and the development of the Shazam! feature film at New Line Cinema, Captain Marvel and characters related to him could not appear in the DC Animated Universe. A planned appearance in Superman: The Animated Series went unproduced, as did a proposed Shazam! series for Cartoon Network pitched by Paul Dini and Alex Ross around the same time.
- Captain Marvel appears in the Justice League Unlimited episode "Clash", voiced by Jerry O'Connell, while Billy Batson is voiced by Shane Haboucha. This version is initially a member of the Justice League, before leaving after his conflicting opinions with Superman cause them to fight and destroy Lex Luthor's Lexor City. At the end of the episode, it is revealed that the clash between the two superheroes was part of a plot organized by Luthor and Amanda Waller to discredit Superman.
- Captain Marvel appears in Batman: The Brave and the Bold, with Captain Marvel voiced by Jeff Bennett and Billy Batson by Tara Strong.
- Captain Marvel / Shazam appears in Young Justice, voiced by Rob Lowe and later by Chad Lowe, while Billy Batson is primarily voiced by Robert Ochoa, with Eric Lopez voicing him in the episode "Teg Ydaer!". This version is a member of the Justice League who temporarily becomes the Team's supervisor following Red Tornado's disappearance. At various times, he joins the Team on missions.
- Captain Marvel appears in Mad.
- Shazam appears in a self-titled series of DC Nation Shorts, voiced by David Kaye, while Billy Batson is voiced again by Tara Strong.
- Shazam appears in Justice League Action, with Shazam and Billy Batson both voiced by Sean Astin. The series premiere, "Shazam Slam", sees Billy recruited by the Wizard and becoming Shazam to help him stop Black Adam. Subsequently, he appears throughout the series as a member of the Justice League.
- Shazam appears in Teen Titans Go!, voiced by John DiMaggio, with Tara Strong once again voicing Billy Batson.
- The DC Extended Universe version of Shazam makes a non-speaking cameo appearance in the Titans episode "Dude, Where's My Gar?".

=== Film ===
==== Live-action films ====
- Captain Marvel appears in Adventures of Captain Marvel, portrayed by Tom Tyler, while Billy Batson is portrayed by Junior Coghlan.
- Captain Marvel appears in The Good Humor Man, which stars Jack Carson as an ice cream vendor and member of a Captain Marvel fan club.
- Shazam appears in films set in the DC Extended Universe (DCEU), portrayed by Zachary Levi, while Billy Batson is portrayed by Asher Angel.

==== Animated films ====
- Captain Marvel makes a non-speaking cameo appearance in Justice League: The New Frontier.
- Captain Marvel appears in Superman/Batman: Public Enemies, voiced by Corey Burton, while Billy Batson is voiced by an uncredited Rachael MacFarlane.
- Captain Super, an alternate universe version of Captain Marvel who is a member of the Crime Syndicate, appears in Justice League: Crisis on Two Earths, voiced by Jim Meskimen.
- Captain Marvel appears in Superman/Shazam!: The Return of Black Adam, voiced again by Jerry O'Connell, while Billy Batson is voiced by Zach Callison.
- The Flashpoint timeline counterparts of the Shazam family appears in Justice League: The Flashpoint Paradox, with Billy Batson voiced by Jennifer Hale, Pedro Peña by Candi Milo, and Captain Thunder by Steve Blum.
- Shazam appears in films set in the DC Animated Movie Universe (DCAMU), voiced by Sean Astin, while Billy Batson is voiced again by Zach Callison.
  - The character is introduced in Justice League: War, where he becomes a founding member of the Justice League as they fight Darkseid.
  - Shazam appears in Justice League: Throne of Atlantis.
  - Shazam appears in Justice League Dark: Apokolips War. He is revealed to have lost a leg during a battle on Apokolips, and replaced it with a magical one. Shazam is later killed sacrificing himself to fend off a horde of Paradooms.
- Billy Batson appears in Lego DC Batman: Family Matters, voiced again by Zach Callison.
- Shazam appears in Lego DC Shazam! Magic and Monsters, voiced again by Sean Astin, while Billy Batson is voiced again by Zach Callison.
- Shazam appears in Injustice, voiced by Yuri Lowenthal.

=== Video games ===
- Captain Marvel appears in Mortal Kombat vs. DC Universe, voiced by Kevin Delaney.
- Captain Marvel appears in DC Universe Online, voiced by Shannon McCormick.
- Captain Marvel appears as an assist character in Batman: The Brave and the Bold – The Videogame, voiced again by Jeff Bennett.
- Captain Marvel appears as a playable character in LEGO Batman 2: DC Super Heroes, voiced by Travis Willingham.
- Captain Marvel appears as a playable character in Infinite Crisis, voiced again by Jerry O'Connell.
- Shazam appears as a playable character in Injustice: Gods Among Us, voiced by Joey Naber. An alternate universe version also appears, who is a member of Superman's Regime before being killed by him for questioning his plans. His death prompts the Flash to defect to the Insurgency, giving the heroes the information they need to stop the Regime.
- Shazam appears as a character summon in Scribblenauts Unmasked: A DC Comics Adventure.
- Shazam appears as a playable character in LEGO Batman 3: Beyond Gotham, voiced by Josh Keaton.
- Shazam appears as a playable character in DC Unchained.
- Shazam appears in Lego DC Super-Villains, voiced by Brandon Routh, while Billy Batson is voiced by Zach Callison. His Earth-3 counterpart Mazahs is also a playable character as well, voiced by Lex Lang. The DC Extended Universe version of the character appears in DLC, with Zachary Levi reprising the role.
- Shazam appears in DC Battle Arena, voiced by P. M. Seymour.

=== Radio ===
In about 1943, a radio serial of Captain Marvel was briefly broadcast (possibly by either Mutual or NBC) initially with Burt Boyar as Billy Batson. According to Boyar's faint memories in a 2011 interview, the show was initially produced in New York but after about a month relocated to Chicago; no further details about the show or transcripts of it survived. Existence of the show was confirmed by historian Jim Harmon via recollections of old-time radio fans who recalled hearing it during original broadcasts, plus locating period program listings.

=== Comic strips ===
In 1943, C. C. Beck and writer Rod Reed prepared seven sample installments of a comic strip, but syndicates expressed no interest in it. Reed suspected that the DC lawsuit was the syndicates' reason, for fear of becoming parties in the ongoing litigation.

== Cultural impact and legacy ==
=== Critical response ===
The character was ranked as the 55th-greatest comic book character of all time by Wizard magazine. IGN also ranked Shazam as the 50th-greatest comic book hero of all time, stating that the character will always be an enduring reminder of a simpler time. UGO Networks ranked him as one of the top heroes of entertainment, saying, "At his best, Shazam has always been compared to Superman with a sense of crazy, goofy fun."

=== Captain Marvel vs. Superman in fiction ===
Captain Marvel's adventures have contributed a number of elements to both comic book culture and pop culture in general. The most notable contribution is the regular use of Superman and Captain Marvel as adversaries in Modern Age comic book stories. The two are often portrayed as equally matched and, while Marvel does not possess Superman's heat vision, X-ray vision or superhuman breath powers, the magic-based nature of his own powers are a weakness for Superman.

The National Comics/Fawcett Comics rivalry was parodied in "Superduperman", a satirical comic book story by Harvey Kurtzman and Wally Wood in the fourth issue of Mad (April/May 1953). Superduperman, endowed with muscles on muscles, does battle with Captain Marbles, a Captain Marvel caricature. Marbles' magic word is "SHAZOOM", which stands for Strength, Health, Aptitude, Zeal, Ox (power of), Ox (power of another), and Money. In contrast to Captain Marvel's perceived innocence and goodness, Marbles is greedy and money-grubbing, and a master criminal. Superduperman defeats Marbles by tricking him into hitting himself.

While publishing its Shazam! revival in the 1970s, DC Comics published a story in Superman #276 (June 1974) featuring a battle between the Man of Steel and a thinly disguised version of Captain Marvel called Captain Thunder, a reference to the character's original name. He apparently battles against a Monster League, who cast a spell to make him evil, but Superman helps him break free. Two years later, Justice League of America #135–137 presented a story arc which featured the heroes of Earth-1, Earth-2, and Earth-S teaming together against their enemies. It is in this story that Superman and Captain Marvel first meet, albeit briefly. King Kull has caused Superman to go mad using red kryptonite, compelling Marvel to battle him at first and subsequently restore Superman's mind with the help of lightning.

In Shazam! #30 (1977), Dr. Sivana creates several steel creatures to destroy Pittsburgh's steel mills, after getting the idea from reading an issue of Action Comics. He finally creates a Superman robot made of a super-steel to destroy Captain Marvel. They both hit each other at the same moment, and the robot is destroyed.

Notable later Superman/Captain Marvel battles in DC Comics include All-New Collectors' Edition #C-58 (1978), All-Star Squadron #36–37 (1984), and Superman vol. 2, #102 (1995). The Superman/Captain Marvel battle depicted in Kingdom Come #4 (1996) serves as the climax of that miniseries, with Marvel having been brainwashed by Lex Luthor and Mister Mind to turn against the other heroes. The "Clash" episode of Justice League Unlimited, which includes Captain Marvel as a guest character, features a Superman/Captain Marvel fight as its centerpiece, Lex Luthor manipulating events so that Captain Marvel will perceive Superman as being prejudiced against Luthor's criminal past and attacking him without provokation or evidence that Luthor has actually done anything wrong. By contrast, the depiction of the pair's first meeting in the Superman/Shazam!: First Thunder miniseries establishes them as firm friends and allies to the point of Superman volunteering to be Billy's mentor when he learns the boy's true age.

=== In popular culture ===
The television character Gomer Pyle is known for uttering the catchphrase "Shazam!" on The Andy Griffith Show and Gomer Pyle, U.S.M.C..

Al McCoy, longtime radio and TV voice of the NBA's Phoenix Suns, would shout "Shazam!" every time the Suns made a three-point shot.

In Spider-Man (2002), Peter Parker yells "Shazam!" while trying to get his powers working.

In Dear Becky (2020), the Boys are depicted as kidnapping their universe's version of Billy Batson/Shazam and cutting out his tongue to prevent him from ever using his powers again.

=== Accolades ===
- Shazam was included in CBR's "Top 50 DC Characters".
