= Jackson Bostwick =

American actor, theatre director and film producer

- Bostwick in Shazam!, 1974
- Born: Jackson Leonard Bostwick Jr. October 23, 1943 (age 83); Carlisle, Pennsylvania, U.S.
- Occupation: Actor
- Years active: 1971–2008
- Spouses: Sheryl Williamson (1980–1981); Kelly Nyman (1988–?); Elizabeth Lamont Bostwick (2002–present)
- Children: 1
- Website: jacksonbostwick.com

Jackson Leonard Bostwick Jr. (born October 23, 1943) is an American actor, theatre director and film producer. He is best known for portraying Captain Marvel in the first season and beginning of the second season of the Shazam! television series in 1974–1975.

== Early life and education ==
Bostwick was born in Carlisle, Pennsylvania. His father, Jackson Leonard Bostwick Sr., was a neurosurgeon in Montgomery, Alabama. A photo of Bostwick's parents is seen in a movie in which he starred, The Prey.

Bostwick studied pre-med at the University of Alabama, where he was a member of Beta Theta Pi fraternity. He also holds a Master of Fine Arts degree from University of Southern California, having been one of the original students in the program.

He studied under acting coach Lurene Tuttle and eventually taught classes of hers.

== Career ==
Bostwick was a contestant on the television game show The Dating Game.

He played the lead character role of Captain Marvel on the Saturday morning television series Shazam! and performed his own stunts. However, he was dismissed from the cast of Shazam! two installments into the second season and replaced in the role by John Davey. Bostwick had not shown up for a day's shooting, and the producers, Louis Scheimer and Norman Prescott, accused him of holding out for a higher salary. Bostwick explained that he had sustained an injury during the previous day's filming and had gone to seek medical treatment. In an interview, he stated, "I was at the doctor's office having my face and eye examined for an injury that I incurred doing a stunt on the previous day (during the filming of a flying takeoff sequence where the stunt boxes hadn't been reset properly)." He successfully litigated against Filmation Associates, which was forced to pay him for the remainder of his contract, plus residuals, including the entire second season.

Bostwick appeared in several minor movie roles in the 1980s, such as a sentry in My Science Project and a guard in Tron. He played park ranger Mark O'Brien in the horror film The Prey (1984). Bostwick later returned to Alabama and taught theater at Auburn University where he directed several plays, including The Ballad of the Sad Cafe. He occasionally appeared in films in the 1990s and 2000s.

Bostwick is the founder of the L.A. (Lower Alabama) Film Group and the MIT (Made [mostly] In Tennessee) Film Group, two independent "off-Hollywood" motion-picture and television production companies.

== Personal life ==
Bostwick has trained in Jeet Kune Do and Wing-Chun kung fu. He also plays the banjo.
